= List of minor planets: 561001–562000 =

The following is a partial list of minor planets, running from minor-planet number 561001 through 562000, inclusive. The primary data for this and other partial lists is based on JPL's "Small-Body Orbital Elements" and data available from the Minor Planet Center. Critical list information is also provided by the MPC, unless otherwise specified from Lowell Observatory. A detailed description of the table's columns and additional sources are given on the main page including a complete list of every page in this series, and a statistical break-up on the dynamical classification of minor planets.

Also see the summary list of all named bodies in numerical and alphabetical order, and the corresponding naming citations for the number range of this particular list. New namings may only be added to this list after official publication, as the preannouncement of names is condemned by the Working Group for Small Bodies Nomenclature of the International Astronomical Union.

| Near-Earth obj. | MBA (inner) | MBA (outer) | Centaur |
| Mars-crosser | MBA (middle) | Jupiter trojan | Trans-Neptunian obj. |
| Unclassified |

== 561001–561100 ==
| Designation | | | Discovery | | | Properties | | Ref |
| Permanent | Provisional | Named after | Date | Site | Discoverer(s) | Category | Diam. | Ref |
|---|---|---|---|---|---|---|---|---|
| 561001 | 2015 PM_{1} | — | September 12, 2002 | Palomar | NEAT | · | 620 m | MPC · JPL |
| 561002 | 2015 PJ_{4} | — | November 6, 2012 | Kitt Peak | Spacewatch | V | 520 m | MPC · JPL |
| 561003 | 2015 PY_{4} | — | July 26, 2008 | Siding Spring | SSS | · | 830 m | MPC · JPL |
| 561004 | 2015 PL_{5} | — | July 14, 2015 | Haleakala | Pan-STARRS 1 | · | 700 m | MPC · JPL |
| 561005 | 2015 PK_{7} | — | September 6, 2010 | Mount Lemmon | Mount Lemmon Survey | · | 2.5 km | MPC · JPL |
| 561006 | 2015 PP_{8} | — | August 27, 2005 | Anderson Mesa | LONEOS | · | 560 m | MPC · JPL |
| 561007 | 2015 PM_{10} | — | December 9, 2009 | La Sagra | OAM | · | 940 m | MPC · JPL |
| 561008 | 2015 PA_{11} | — | January 11, 2003 | Kitt Peak | Spacewatch | · | 970 m | MPC · JPL |
| 561009 | 2015 PZ_{11} | — | June 28, 2011 | Mount Lemmon | Mount Lemmon Survey | · | 1.0 km | MPC · JPL |
| 561010 | 2015 PD_{14} | — | October 16, 2012 | Mount Lemmon | Mount Lemmon Survey | · | 610 m | MPC · JPL |
| 561011 | 2015 PF_{15} | — | October 7, 2012 | Haleakala | Pan-STARRS 1 | · | 660 m | MPC · JPL |
| 561012 | 2015 PL_{16} | — | February 25, 2011 | Mount Lemmon | Mount Lemmon Survey | · | 670 m | MPC · JPL |
| 561013 | 2015 PS_{16} | — | October 24, 2009 | Kitt Peak | Spacewatch | · | 620 m | MPC · JPL |
| 561014 | 2015 PP_{17} | — | October 7, 1996 | Kitt Peak | Spacewatch | · | 1.1 km | MPC · JPL |
| 561015 | 2015 PD_{22} | — | September 19, 2012 | Mount Lemmon | Mount Lemmon Survey | V | 470 m | MPC · JPL |
| 561016 | 2015 PT_{26} | — | February 7, 2008 | Kitt Peak | Spacewatch | · | 650 m | MPC · JPL |
| 561017 | 2015 PZ_{30} | — | June 27, 2015 | Haleakala | Pan-STARRS 1 | · | 670 m | MPC · JPL |
| 561018 | 2015 PE_{32} | — | August 23, 2004 | Kitt Peak | Spacewatch | · | 900 m | MPC · JPL |
| 561019 | 2015 PE_{36} | — | October 6, 2012 | Haleakala | Pan-STARRS 1 | · | 660 m | MPC · JPL |
| 561020 | 2015 PQ_{36} | — | October 21, 2012 | Haleakala | Pan-STARRS 1 | · | 680 m | MPC · JPL |
| 561021 | 2015 PC_{39} | — | October 20, 2012 | Haleakala | Pan-STARRS 1 | · | 680 m | MPC · JPL |
| 561022 | 2015 PM_{40} | — | August 15, 2002 | Palomar | NEAT | · | 4.7 km | MPC · JPL |
| 561023 | 2015 PE_{42} | — | August 4, 2008 | Siding Spring | SSS | · | 850 m | MPC · JPL |
| 561024 | 2015 PT_{42} | — | April 3, 2002 | Kitt Peak | Spacewatch | · | 650 m | MPC · JPL |
| 561025 | 2015 PF_{46} | — | March 24, 2014 | Haleakala | Pan-STARRS 1 | · | 790 m | MPC · JPL |
| 561026 | 2015 PO_{46} | — | February 21, 2007 | Vail-Jarnac | Jarnac | · | 980 m | MPC · JPL |
| 561027 | 2015 PH_{47} | — | March 6, 2011 | Kitt Peak | Spacewatch | · | 580 m | MPC · JPL |
| 561028 | 2015 PA_{48} | — | September 13, 2005 | Kitt Peak | Spacewatch | · | 860 m | MPC · JPL |
| 561029 | 2015 PD_{49} | — | April 23, 2007 | Mount Lemmon | Mount Lemmon Survey | · | 760 m | MPC · JPL |
| 561030 | 2015 PP_{50} | — | January 10, 2008 | Catalina | CSS | · | 1.4 km | MPC · JPL |
| 561031 | 2015 PV_{51} | — | June 17, 2015 | Haleakala | Pan-STARRS 1 | · | 1.0 km | MPC · JPL |
| 561032 | 2015 PF_{54} | — | January 25, 2007 | Kitt Peak | Spacewatch | · | 690 m | MPC · JPL |
| 561033 | 2015 PY_{54} | — | January 4, 2006 | Kitt Peak | Spacewatch | · | 680 m | MPC · JPL |
| 561034 | 2015 PC_{55} | — | February 27, 2008 | Catalina | CSS | · | 1.8 km | MPC · JPL |
| 561035 | 2015 PO_{55} | — | August 9, 2015 | Haleakala | Pan-STARRS 1 | · | 700 m | MPC · JPL |
| 561036 | 2015 PA_{56} | — | October 8, 2008 | Mount Lemmon | Mount Lemmon Survey | · | 1.1 km | MPC · JPL |
| 561037 | 2015 PB_{58} | — | August 8, 2015 | Haleakala | Pan-STARRS 1 | MAR | 1.1 km | MPC · JPL |
| 561038 | 2015 PS_{58} | — | July 19, 2015 | Haleakala | Pan-STARRS 1 | · | 580 m | MPC · JPL |
| 561039 | 2015 PS_{63} | — | December 21, 2006 | Kitt Peak | Spacewatch | · | 680 m | MPC · JPL |
| 561040 | 2015 PK_{64} | — | April 14, 2008 | Kitt Peak | Spacewatch | · | 550 m | MPC · JPL |
| 561041 | 2015 PJ_{71} | — | April 14, 2008 | Mount Lemmon | Mount Lemmon Survey | · | 590 m | MPC · JPL |
| 561042 | 2015 PH_{73} | — | February 26, 2014 | Haleakala | Pan-STARRS 1 | V | 480 m | MPC · JPL |
| 561043 | 2015 PB_{75} | — | October 16, 2012 | Mount Lemmon | Mount Lemmon Survey | · | 700 m | MPC · JPL |
| 561044 | 2015 PV_{82} | — | October 15, 2001 | Kitt Peak | Spacewatch | MAS | 540 m | MPC · JPL |
| 561045 | 2015 PM_{88} | — | October 26, 2009 | Kitt Peak | Spacewatch | · | 470 m | MPC · JPL |
| 561046 | 2015 PS_{90} | — | October 6, 2012 | Haleakala | Pan-STARRS 1 | · | 580 m | MPC · JPL |
| 561047 | 2015 PS_{91} | — | September 26, 2005 | Kitt Peak | Spacewatch | NYS | 720 m | MPC · JPL |
| 561048 | 2015 PF_{92} | — | August 10, 2015 | Haleakala | Pan-STARRS 1 | · | 780 m | MPC · JPL |
| 561049 | 2015 PV_{94} | — | March 11, 2005 | Mount Lemmon | Mount Lemmon Survey | 3:2 · SHU | 5.5 km | MPC · JPL |
| 561050 | 2015 PV_{96} | — | October 12, 2009 | Mount Lemmon | Mount Lemmon Survey | · | 710 m | MPC · JPL |
| 561051 | 2015 PJ_{105} | — | July 19, 2015 | Haleakala | Pan-STARRS 1 | · | 650 m | MPC · JPL |
| 561052 | 2015 PG_{107} | — | January 25, 2014 | Haleakala | Pan-STARRS 1 | · | 490 m | MPC · JPL |
| 561053 | 2015 PE_{110} | — | September 21, 2008 | Kitt Peak | Spacewatch | · | 1.4 km | MPC · JPL |
| 561054 | 2015 PG_{111} | — | March 8, 2005 | Mount Lemmon | Mount Lemmon Survey | · | 1.3 km | MPC · JPL |
| 561055 | 2015 PW_{114} | — | January 11, 2010 | Kitt Peak | Spacewatch | V | 460 m | MPC · JPL |
| 561056 | 2015 PD_{128} | — | July 25, 2015 | Haleakala | Pan-STARRS 1 | · | 1.1 km | MPC · JPL |
| 561057 | 2015 PD_{130} | — | February 26, 2007 | Mount Lemmon | Mount Lemmon Survey | · | 720 m | MPC · JPL |
| 561058 | 2015 PG_{132} | — | November 4, 2012 | Mount Lemmon | Mount Lemmon Survey | · | 740 m | MPC · JPL |
| 561059 | 2015 PA_{136} | — | September 27, 2008 | Mount Lemmon | Mount Lemmon Survey | CLA | 1.2 km | MPC · JPL |
| 561060 | 2015 PT_{136} | — | August 28, 2006 | Kitt Peak | Spacewatch | · | 1.5 km | MPC · JPL |
| 561061 | 2015 PZ_{143} | — | August 4, 2005 | Palomar | NEAT | · | 690 m | MPC · JPL |
| 561062 | 2015 PP_{146} | — | September 12, 2007 | Mount Lemmon | Mount Lemmon Survey | · | 930 m | MPC · JPL |
| 561063 | 2015 PQ_{154} | — | August 10, 2015 | Haleakala | Pan-STARRS 1 | · | 580 m | MPC · JPL |
| 561064 | 2015 PP_{155} | — | February 1, 2009 | Kitt Peak | Spacewatch | · | 1.1 km | MPC · JPL |
| 561065 | 2015 PL_{158} | — | September 23, 2008 | Mount Lemmon | Mount Lemmon Survey | · | 980 m | MPC · JPL |
| 561066 | 2015 PR_{165} | — | November 17, 2012 | Kitt Peak | Spacewatch | · | 870 m | MPC · JPL |
| 561067 | 2015 PX_{165} | — | January 2, 2012 | Mount Lemmon | Mount Lemmon Survey | · | 3.3 km | MPC · JPL |
| 561068 | 2015 PZ_{167} | — | August 10, 2015 | Haleakala | Pan-STARRS 1 | · | 670 m | MPC · JPL |
| 561069 | 2015 PC_{172} | — | January 6, 2010 | Kitt Peak | Spacewatch | · | 550 m | MPC · JPL |
| 561070 | 2015 PH_{176} | — | August 10, 2015 | Haleakala | Pan-STARRS 1 | · | 740 m | MPC · JPL |
| 561071 | 2015 PV_{176} | — | September 18, 1995 | Kitt Peak | Spacewatch | · | 470 m | MPC · JPL |
| 561072 | 2015 PY_{180} | — | May 31, 2011 | Mount Lemmon | Mount Lemmon Survey | · | 560 m | MPC · JPL |
| 561073 | 2015 PP_{183} | — | October 24, 2008 | Mount Lemmon | Mount Lemmon Survey | NYS | 940 m | MPC · JPL |
| 561074 | 2015 PO_{184} | — | August 10, 2015 | Haleakala | Pan-STARRS 1 | 3:2 | 4.3 km | MPC · JPL |
| 561075 | 2015 PA_{190} | — | November 30, 2005 | Kitt Peak | Spacewatch | V | 550 m | MPC · JPL |
| 561076 | 2015 PH_{191} | — | April 6, 2011 | Kitt Peak | Spacewatch | · | 730 m | MPC · JPL |
| 561077 | 2015 PW_{202} | — | December 10, 2009 | Mount Lemmon | Mount Lemmon Survey | · | 860 m | MPC · JPL |
| 561078 | 2015 PO_{204} | — | October 9, 2012 | Charleston | R. Holmes | · | 550 m | MPC · JPL |
| 561079 | 2015 PV_{204} | — | October 20, 2012 | Haleakala | Pan-STARRS 1 | · | 880 m | MPC · JPL |
| 561080 | 2015 PR_{205} | — | October 16, 2012 | Mount Lemmon | Mount Lemmon Survey | · | 1.2 km | MPC · JPL |
| 561081 | 2015 PC_{230} | — | December 3, 2005 | Mauna Kea | A. Boattini | · | 1.5 km | MPC · JPL |
| 561082 | 2015 PS_{231} | — | September 13, 2002 | Palomar | NEAT | · | 570 m | MPC · JPL |
| 561083 | 2015 PT_{231} | — | November 11, 2012 | Nogales | M. Schwartz, P. R. Holvorcem | · | 660 m | MPC · JPL |
| 561084 | 2015 PP_{232} | — | February 9, 2014 | Haleakala | Pan-STARRS 1 | · | 760 m | MPC · JPL |
| 561085 | 2015 PH_{235} | — | July 30, 2008 | Kitt Peak | Spacewatch | MAS | 780 m | MPC · JPL |
| 561086 | 2015 PP_{242} | — | May 3, 2008 | Mount Lemmon | Mount Lemmon Survey | · | 480 m | MPC · JPL |
| 561087 | 2015 PL_{250} | — | August 10, 2015 | Haleakala | Pan-STARRS 1 | · | 2.2 km | MPC · JPL |
| 561088 | 2015 PY_{251} | — | February 10, 2014 | Mount Lemmon | Mount Lemmon Survey | · | 690 m | MPC · JPL |
| 561089 | 2015 PT_{254} | — | February 5, 2000 | Kitt Peak | Spacewatch | · | 870 m | MPC · JPL |
| 561090 | 2015 PK_{257} | — | September 21, 2012 | Mount Lemmon | Mount Lemmon Survey | · | 550 m | MPC · JPL |
| 561091 | 2015 PY_{266} | — | February 4, 2006 | Kitt Peak | Spacewatch | · | 930 m | MPC · JPL |
| 561092 | 2015 PB_{270} | — | September 28, 2001 | Palomar | NEAT | · | 1.0 km | MPC · JPL |
| 561093 | 2015 PS_{271} | — | December 27, 2005 | Catalina | CSS | · | 770 m | MPC · JPL |
| 561094 | 2015 PZ_{271} | — | October 18, 2012 | Haleakala | Pan-STARRS 1 | · | 490 m | MPC · JPL |
| 561095 | 2015 PV_{273} | — | December 20, 2009 | Mount Lemmon | Mount Lemmon Survey | · | 830 m | MPC · JPL |
| 561096 | 2015 PB_{274} | — | October 9, 2012 | Mount Lemmon | Mount Lemmon Survey | V | 450 m | MPC · JPL |
| 561097 | 2015 PO_{276} | — | October 18, 2012 | Haleakala | Pan-STARRS 1 | · | 620 m | MPC · JPL |
| 561098 | 2015 PU_{276} | — | October 7, 2004 | Kitt Peak | Spacewatch | · | 920 m | MPC · JPL |
| 561099 | 2015 PE_{284} | — | November 10, 2004 | Kitt Peak | Spacewatch | · | 980 m | MPC · JPL |
| 561100 | 2015 PN_{284} | — | October 20, 2012 | Haleakala | Pan-STARRS 1 | · | 660 m | MPC · JPL |

== 561101–561200 ==
back to top

| Designation | | | Discovery | | | Properties | | Ref |
| Permanent | Provisional | Named after | Date | Site | Discoverer(s) | Category | Diam. | Ref |
|---|---|---|---|---|---|---|---|---|
| 561101 | 2015 PP_{284} | — | April 18, 2013 | Mount Lemmon | Mount Lemmon Survey | SYL | 4.1 km | MPC · JPL |
| 561102 | 2015 PL_{285} | — | October 2, 2008 | Mount Lemmon | Mount Lemmon Survey | V | 600 m | MPC · JPL |
| 561103 | 2015 PZ_{287} | — | October 4, 2008 | Catalina | CSS | · | 1.1 km | MPC · JPL |
| 561104 | 2015 PC_{289} | — | August 12, 2015 | Haleakala | Pan-STARRS 1 | · | 1.2 km | MPC · JPL |
| 561105 | 2015 PC_{290} | — | March 30, 2011 | Bergisch Gladbach | W. Bickel | · | 680 m | MPC · JPL |
| 561106 | 2015 PY_{294} | — | December 3, 2012 | Mount Lemmon | Mount Lemmon Survey | · | 620 m | MPC · JPL |
| 561107 | 2015 PN_{295} | — | November 25, 2009 | Kitt Peak | Spacewatch | · | 630 m | MPC · JPL |
| 561108 | 2015 PJ_{296} | — | August 13, 2015 | Haleakala | Pan-STARRS 1 | · | 900 m | MPC · JPL |
| 561109 | 2015 PJ_{298} | — | September 6, 2008 | Catalina | CSS | · | 1.0 km | MPC · JPL |
| 561110 | 2015 PO_{301} | — | April 28, 2011 | Haleakala | Pan-STARRS 1 | · | 850 m | MPC · JPL |
| 561111 | 2015 PP_{302} | — | February 25, 2011 | Kitt Peak | Spacewatch | · | 920 m | MPC · JPL |
| 561112 | 2015 PO_{304} | — | May 4, 2008 | Kitt Peak | Spacewatch | · | 620 m | MPC · JPL |
| 561113 | 2015 PT_{304} | — | February 9, 2013 | Haleakala | Pan-STARRS 1 | · | 1.1 km | MPC · JPL |
| 561114 | 2015 PO_{307} | — | April 14, 2010 | Mount Lemmon | Mount Lemmon Survey | · | 1.7 km | MPC · JPL |
| 561115 | 2015 PT_{307} | — | February 26, 2014 | Haleakala | Pan-STARRS 1 | · | 720 m | MPC · JPL |
| 561116 | 2015 PZ_{307} | — | November 4, 2005 | Mount Lemmon | Mount Lemmon Survey | · | 630 m | MPC · JPL |
| 561117 | 2015 PW_{310} | — | November 20, 2000 | Anderson Mesa | LONEOS | PHO | 1.3 km | MPC · JPL |
| 561118 | 2015 PE_{311} | — | May 1, 2011 | Haleakala | Pan-STARRS 1 | · | 660 m | MPC · JPL |
| 561119 | 2015 PH_{314} | — | January 15, 1996 | Kitt Peak | Spacewatch | (5) | 1.1 km | MPC · JPL |
| 561120 | 2015 PK_{314} | — | December 25, 2009 | Kitt Peak | Spacewatch | · | 720 m | MPC · JPL |
| 561121 | 2015 PF_{315} | — | May 6, 2014 | Haleakala | Pan-STARRS 1 | · | 1.1 km | MPC · JPL |
| 561122 | 2015 PX_{318} | — | August 9, 2015 | Haleakala | Pan-STARRS 1 | · | 700 m | MPC · JPL |
| 561123 | 2015 PF_{319} | — | August 9, 2015 | Haleakala | Pan-STARRS 1 | · | 1.0 km | MPC · JPL |
| 561124 | 2015 PR_{319} | — | August 11, 2015 | Haleakala | Pan-STARRS 1 | · | 1.0 km | MPC · JPL |
| 561125 | 2015 PP_{320} | — | April 5, 2014 | Haleakala | Pan-STARRS 1 | V | 560 m | MPC · JPL |
| 561126 | 2015 PX_{320} | — | September 12, 2007 | Kitt Peak | Spacewatch | · | 1.1 km | MPC · JPL |
| 561127 | 2015 PE_{332} | — | August 9, 2015 | Haleakala | Pan-STARRS 1 | PHO | 880 m | MPC · JPL |
| 561128 | 2015 QK_{1} | — | June 20, 2015 | Haleakala | Pan-STARRS 1 | · | 760 m | MPC · JPL |
| 561129 | 2015 QY_{1} | — | March 11, 2011 | Mount Lemmon | Mount Lemmon Survey | · | 610 m | MPC · JPL |
| 561130 | 2015 QQ_{2} | — | December 16, 2009 | Mount Lemmon | Mount Lemmon Survey | · | 700 m | MPC · JPL |
| 561131 | 2015 QL_{6} | — | January 16, 2007 | Mount Lemmon | Mount Lemmon Survey | · | 630 m | MPC · JPL |
| 561132 | 2015 QN_{11} | — | August 28, 2015 | Haleakala | Pan-STARRS 1 | · | 1.7 km | MPC · JPL |
| 561133 | 2015 QX_{13} | — | October 24, 2011 | Haleakala | Pan-STARRS 1 | · | 1.4 km | MPC · JPL |
| 561134 | 2015 QY_{14} | — | May 7, 2014 | Haleakala | Pan-STARRS 1 | · | 910 m | MPC · JPL |
| 561135 | 2015 QM_{15} | — | October 9, 2008 | Kitt Peak | Spacewatch | · | 790 m | MPC · JPL |
| 561136 | 2015 QY_{20} | — | August 21, 2015 | Haleakala | Pan-STARRS 1 | JUN | 820 m | MPC · JPL |
| 561137 | 2015 RV | — | March 5, 2008 | Kitt Peak | Spacewatch | · | 560 m | MPC · JPL |
| 561138 | 2015 RT_{8} | — | March 16, 2004 | Kitt Peak | Spacewatch | · | 770 m | MPC · JPL |
| 561139 | 2015 RZ_{9} | — | December 12, 2012 | Mount Lemmon | Mount Lemmon Survey | · | 700 m | MPC · JPL |
| 561140 | 2015 RJ_{13} | — | April 5, 2011 | Kitt Peak | Spacewatch | · | 560 m | MPC · JPL |
| 561141 | 2015 RP_{14} | — | December 31, 2008 | Mount Lemmon | Mount Lemmon Survey | · | 1.2 km | MPC · JPL |
| 561142 | 2015 RB_{17} | — | October 19, 1995 | Kitt Peak | Spacewatch | · | 550 m | MPC · JPL |
| 561143 | 2015 RQ_{18} | — | July 25, 2015 | Haleakala | Pan-STARRS 1 | V | 560 m | MPC · JPL |
| 561144 | 2015 RJ_{21} | — | March 30, 2011 | Mount Lemmon | Mount Lemmon Survey | · | 530 m | MPC · JPL |
| 561145 | 2015 RC_{22} | — | May 8, 2014 | Haleakala | Pan-STARRS 1 | · | 800 m | MPC · JPL |
| 561146 | 2015 RO_{24} | — | September 7, 2004 | Kitt Peak | Spacewatch | · | 1.1 km | MPC · JPL |
| 561147 | 2015 RP_{24} | — | January 18, 2013 | Kitt Peak | Spacewatch | NYS | 1.1 km | MPC · JPL |
| 561148 | 2015 RE_{25} | — | September 6, 2008 | Mount Lemmon | Mount Lemmon Survey | · | 740 m | MPC · JPL |
| 561149 | 2015 RP_{26} | — | July 22, 2001 | Palomar | NEAT | · | 940 m | MPC · JPL |
| 561150 | 2015 RS_{26} | — | October 30, 2005 | Kitt Peak | Spacewatch | · | 700 m | MPC · JPL |
| 561151 | 2015 RL_{27} | — | January 26, 2009 | Mount Lemmon | Mount Lemmon Survey | · | 1.2 km | MPC · JPL |
| 561152 | 2015 RR_{27} | — | September 25, 2007 | Mount Lemmon | Mount Lemmon Survey | · | 1.5 km | MPC · JPL |
| 561153 | 2015 RJ_{29} | — | March 20, 2007 | Mount Lemmon | Mount Lemmon Survey | · | 670 m | MPC · JPL |
| 561154 | 2015 RO_{29} | — | October 6, 2008 | Mount Lemmon | Mount Lemmon Survey | V | 570 m | MPC · JPL |
| 561155 | 2015 RQ_{29} | — | August 25, 2005 | Palomar | NEAT | · | 590 m | MPC · JPL |
| 561156 | 2015 RR_{29} | — | February 6, 2013 | Nogales | M. Schwartz, P. R. Holvorcem | · | 1.6 km | MPC · JPL |
| 561157 | 2015 RS_{30} | — | September 12, 1994 | Kitt Peak | Spacewatch | EUN | 1.3 km | MPC · JPL |
| 561158 | 2015 RV_{30} | — | September 8, 2015 | XuYi | PMO NEO Survey Program | · | 1.0 km | MPC · JPL |
| 561159 | 2015 RE_{31} | — | August 24, 2011 | Haleakala | Pan-STARRS 1 | · | 980 m | MPC · JPL |
| 561160 | 2015 RG_{31} | — | November 4, 2008 | Vail-Jarnac | Jarnac | · | 1.0 km | MPC · JPL |
| 561161 | 2015 RY_{31} | — | February 5, 2013 | Kitt Peak | Spacewatch | HNS | 970 m | MPC · JPL |
| 561162 | 2015 RM_{37} | — | October 30, 2005 | Mount Lemmon | Mount Lemmon Survey | · | 640 m | MPC · JPL |
| 561163 | 2015 RQ_{37} | — | September 19, 2008 | Kitt Peak | Spacewatch | · | 610 m | MPC · JPL |
| 561164 | 2015 RK_{38} | — | July 28, 2015 | Haleakala | Pan-STARRS 1 | · | 1.0 km | MPC · JPL |
| 561165 | 2015 RY_{38} | — | March 14, 2013 | Kitt Peak | Spacewatch | BRG | 1.2 km | MPC · JPL |
| 561166 | 2015 RS_{40} | — | March 13, 2007 | Mount Lemmon | Mount Lemmon Survey | V | 620 m | MPC · JPL |
| 561167 | 2015 RW_{40} | — | July 27, 2011 | Haleakala | Pan-STARRS 1 | · | 1.2 km | MPC · JPL |
| 561168 | 2015 RN_{44} | — | July 25, 2015 | Haleakala | Pan-STARRS 1 | · | 720 m | MPC · JPL |
| 561169 | 2015 RX_{46} | — | January 3, 2013 | Haleakala | Pan-STARRS 1 | · | 1.4 km | MPC · JPL |
| 561170 | 2015 RQ_{47} | — | November 20, 2008 | Mount Lemmon | Mount Lemmon Survey | · | 830 m | MPC · JPL |
| 561171 | 2015 RS_{47} | — | March 13, 2007 | Kitt Peak | Spacewatch | · | 720 m | MPC · JPL |
| 561172 | 2015 RQ_{55} | — | May 26, 2006 | Mount Lemmon | Mount Lemmon Survey | NYS | 1.1 km | MPC · JPL |
| 561173 | 2015 RM_{56} | — | December 20, 2004 | Mount Lemmon | Mount Lemmon Survey | · | 1.0 km | MPC · JPL |
| 561174 | 2015 RK_{58} | — | April 13, 2004 | Kitt Peak | Spacewatch | · | 540 m | MPC · JPL |
| 561175 | 2015 RN_{59} | — | September 10, 2015 | Haleakala | Pan-STARRS 1 | · | 950 m | MPC · JPL |
| 561176 | 2015 RQ_{60} | — | February 23, 2003 | Kitt Peak | Spacewatch | · | 1 km | MPC · JPL |
| 561177 | 2015 RR_{60} | — | October 6, 2004 | Kitt Peak | Spacewatch | · | 840 m | MPC · JPL |
| 561178 | 2015 RR_{62} | — | September 26, 2006 | Mount Lemmon | Mount Lemmon Survey | · | 1.3 km | MPC · JPL |
| 561179 | 2015 RW_{63} | — | December 16, 2012 | ESA OGS | ESA OGS | MAS | 910 m | MPC · JPL |
| 561180 | 2015 RP_{64} | — | February 27, 2006 | Kitt Peak | Spacewatch | · | 1.0 km | MPC · JPL |
| 561181 | 2015 RU_{71} | — | January 4, 2013 | Kitt Peak | Spacewatch | · | 930 m | MPC · JPL |
| 561182 | 2015 RR_{74} | — | May 4, 2014 | Haleakala | Pan-STARRS 1 | V | 430 m | MPC · JPL |
| 561183 | 2015 RC_{75} | — | September 10, 2015 | Haleakala | Pan-STARRS 1 | · | 440 m | MPC · JPL |
| 561184 | 2015 RH_{77} | — | September 7, 2000 | Kitt Peak | Spacewatch | · | 1.1 km | MPC · JPL |
| 561185 | 2015 RD_{78} | — | January 13, 2013 | ESA OGS | ESA OGS | · | 1.2 km | MPC · JPL |
| 561186 | 2015 RZ_{83} | — | January 10, 2013 | Haleakala | Pan-STARRS 1 | · | 750 m | MPC · JPL |
| 561187 | 2015 RS_{85} | — | September 8, 2015 | XuYi | PMO NEO Survey Program | PHO | 790 m | MPC · JPL |
| 561188 | 2015 RL_{86} | — | August 30, 2005 | Palomar | NEAT | · | 800 m | MPC · JPL |
| 561189 | 2015 RY_{87} | — | July 25, 2015 | Haleakala | Pan-STARRS 1 | · | 1.2 km | MPC · JPL |
| 561190 | 2015 RU_{88} | — | September 6, 2015 | XuYi | PMO NEO Survey Program | · | 830 m | MPC · JPL |
| 561191 | 2015 RC_{89} | — | February 15, 2013 | Haleakala | Pan-STARRS 1 | · | 1.4 km | MPC · JPL |
| 561192 | 2015 RE_{89} | — | June 24, 2015 | Haleakala | Pan-STARRS 1 | · | 1.2 km | MPC · JPL |
| 561193 | 2015 RN_{90} | — | April 7, 2002 | Cerro Tololo | Deep Ecliptic Survey | MAS | 690 m | MPC · JPL |
| 561194 | 2015 RQ_{90} | — | August 24, 2011 | Haleakala | Pan-STARRS 1 | · | 1.4 km | MPC · JPL |
| 561195 | 2015 RF_{91} | — | October 10, 2008 | Mount Lemmon | Mount Lemmon Survey | V | 680 m | MPC · JPL |
| 561196 | 2015 RN_{91} | — | October 19, 2012 | Haleakala | Pan-STARRS 1 | · | 930 m | MPC · JPL |
| 561197 | 2015 RQ_{91} | — | December 9, 2012 | ASC-Kislovodsk | Nevski, V., Romas, E. | · | 1.0 km | MPC · JPL |
| 561198 | 2015 RG_{92} | — | November 5, 2005 | Kitt Peak | Spacewatch | · | 720 m | MPC · JPL |
| 561199 | 2015 RX_{96} | — | February 26, 2014 | Mount Lemmon | Mount Lemmon Survey | · | 570 m | MPC · JPL |
| 561200 | 2015 RB_{99} | — | April 4, 2002 | Palomar | NEAT | · | 1.8 km | MPC · JPL |

== 561201–561300 ==
back to top

| Designation | | | Discovery | | | Properties | | Ref |
| Permanent | Provisional | Named after | Date | Site | Discoverer(s) | Category | Diam. | Ref |
|---|---|---|---|---|---|---|---|---|
| 561201 | 2015 RC_{100} | — | September 4, 2008 | Kitt Peak | Spacewatch | · | 940 m | MPC · JPL |
| 561202 | 2015 RR_{100} | — | January 20, 2013 | Kitt Peak | Spacewatch | · | 1.0 km | MPC · JPL |
| 561203 | 2015 RB_{101} | — | October 7, 2004 | Kitt Peak | Spacewatch | NYS | 1.0 km | MPC · JPL |
| 561204 | 2015 RN_{101} | — | July 30, 2015 | Haleakala | Pan-STARRS 1 | · | 1.1 km | MPC · JPL |
| 561205 | 2015 RX_{101} | — | August 10, 2008 | Reedy Creek | J. Broughton | · | 720 m | MPC · JPL |
| 561206 | 2015 RZ_{101} | — | August 12, 2015 | Haleakala | Pan-STARRS 1 | EUN | 1.2 km | MPC · JPL |
| 561207 | 2015 RD_{102} | — | February 28, 2014 | Haleakala | Pan-STARRS 1 | · | 920 m | MPC · JPL |
| 561208 | 2015 RF_{103} | — | March 25, 2011 | Haleakala | Pan-STARRS 1 | · | 780 m | MPC · JPL |
| 561209 | 2015 RT_{105} | — | August 31, 2005 | Kitt Peak | Spacewatch | · | 810 m | MPC · JPL |
| 561210 | 2015 RV_{105} | — | September 7, 2008 | Mount Lemmon | Mount Lemmon Survey | · | 1.0 km | MPC · JPL |
| 561211 | 2015 RF_{106} | — | September 21, 1998 | Kitt Peak | Spacewatch | · | 620 m | MPC · JPL |
| 561212 | 2015 RY_{106} | — | July 23, 2015 | Haleakala | Pan-STARRS 1 | · | 920 m | MPC · JPL |
| 561213 | 2015 RC_{107} | — | February 28, 2014 | Haleakala | Pan-STARRS 1 | PHO | 700 m | MPC · JPL |
| 561214 | 2015 RS_{107} | — | November 12, 2012 | Mount Lemmon | Mount Lemmon Survey | · | 530 m | MPC · JPL |
| 561215 | 2015 RC_{108} | — | December 31, 2008 | XuYi | PMO NEO Survey Program | · | 1.3 km | MPC · JPL |
| 561216 | 2015 RE_{108} | — | September 12, 2002 | Haleakala | NEAT | · | 620 m | MPC · JPL |
| 561217 | 2015 RK_{108} | — | September 6, 2008 | Catalina | CSS | · | 660 m | MPC · JPL |
| 561218 | 2015 RM_{108} | — | June 13, 2005 | Mount Lemmon | Mount Lemmon Survey | · | 670 m | MPC · JPL |
| 561219 | 2015 RV_{108} | — | November 3, 2005 | Mount Lemmon | Mount Lemmon Survey | · | 700 m | MPC · JPL |
| 561220 | 2015 RY_{108} | — | June 28, 2004 | Siding Spring | SSS | · | 1.4 km | MPC · JPL |
| 561221 | 2015 RE_{109} | — | March 15, 2013 | Kitt Peak | Spacewatch | JUN | 1.1 km | MPC · JPL |
| 561222 | 2015 RL_{109} | — | December 16, 2007 | Mount Lemmon | Mount Lemmon Survey | · | 1.1 km | MPC · JPL |
| 561223 | 2015 RQ_{112} | — | April 5, 2014 | Haleakala | Pan-STARRS 1 | · | 510 m | MPC · JPL |
| 561224 | 2015 RO_{114} | — | May 8, 2008 | Mount Lemmon | Mount Lemmon Survey | · | 420 m | MPC · JPL |
| 561225 | 2015 RC_{116} | — | September 20, 2008 | Catalina | CSS | · | 940 m | MPC · JPL |
| 561226 | 2015 RX_{116} | — | November 4, 2004 | Catalina | CSS | PHO | 800 m | MPC · JPL |
| 561227 | 2015 RM_{117} | — | September 8, 2015 | Haleakala | Pan-STARRS 1 | PHO | 1 km | MPC · JPL |
| 561228 | 2015 RP_{117} | — | January 16, 2009 | Mount Lemmon | Mount Lemmon Survey | · | 1.2 km | MPC · JPL |
| 561229 | 2015 RV_{117} | — | July 27, 2001 | Haleakala | NEAT | · | 1.0 km | MPC · JPL |
| 561230 | 2015 RH_{119} | — | July 8, 2005 | Kitt Peak | Spacewatch | · | 570 m | MPC · JPL |
| 561231 | 2015 RA_{122} | — | April 4, 2014 | Haleakala | Pan-STARRS 1 | · | 840 m | MPC · JPL |
| 561232 | 2015 RU_{122} | — | June 5, 2011 | Nogales | M. Schwartz, P. R. Holvorcem | V | 860 m | MPC · JPL |
| 561233 | 2015 RW_{122} | — | November 11, 2001 | Apache Point | SDSS | V | 680 m | MPC · JPL |
| 561234 | 2015 RC_{123} | — | February 28, 2014 | Haleakala | Pan-STARRS 1 | V | 580 m | MPC · JPL |
| 561235 | 2015 RT_{123} | — | July 23, 2015 | Haleakala | Pan-STARRS 1 | PHO | 820 m | MPC · JPL |
| 561236 | 2015 RZ_{125} | — | May 23, 2011 | Mount Lemmon | Mount Lemmon Survey | (1338) (FLO) | 590 m | MPC · JPL |
| 561237 | 2015 RY_{126} | — | November 9, 2004 | Catalina | CSS | · | 1.1 km | MPC · JPL |
| 561238 | 2015 RA_{130} | — | January 26, 2006 | Mount Lemmon | Mount Lemmon Survey | NYS | 790 m | MPC · JPL |
| 561239 | 2015 RU_{137} | — | December 19, 2012 | Oukaïmeden | M. Ory | · | 1.1 km | MPC · JPL |
| 561240 | 2015 RO_{141} | — | March 26, 2003 | Kitt Peak | Spacewatch | · | 820 m | MPC · JPL |
| 561241 | 2015 RJ_{144} | — | August 29, 2006 | Kitt Peak | Spacewatch | · | 1.3 km | MPC · JPL |
| 561242 | 2015 RJ_{149} | — | January 9, 2013 | Kitt Peak | Spacewatch | · | 720 m | MPC · JPL |
| 561243 | 2015 RB_{150} | — | September 25, 2008 | Kitt Peak | Spacewatch | NYS | 790 m | MPC · JPL |
| 561244 | 2015 RH_{153} | — | February 10, 2010 | Kitt Peak | Spacewatch | V | 530 m | MPC · JPL |
| 561245 | 2015 RP_{160} | — | September 9, 2015 | Haleakala | Pan-STARRS 1 | · | 880 m | MPC · JPL |
| 561246 | 2015 RH_{168} | — | November 2, 2008 | Mount Lemmon | Mount Lemmon Survey | · | 960 m | MPC · JPL |
| 561247 | 2015 RS_{174} | — | January 27, 2006 | Mount Lemmon | Mount Lemmon Survey | · | 920 m | MPC · JPL |
| 561248 | 2015 RF_{185} | — | February 5, 2013 | Kitt Peak | Spacewatch | · | 1.0 km | MPC · JPL |
| 561249 | 2015 RM_{185} | — | September 4, 2008 | Kitt Peak | Spacewatch | · | 780 m | MPC · JPL |
| 561250 | 2015 RX_{189} | — | December 30, 2011 | Mount Lemmon | Mount Lemmon Survey | · | 4.1 km | MPC · JPL |
| 561251 | 2015 RM_{191} | — | November 17, 2006 | Mount Lemmon | Mount Lemmon Survey | HOF | 2.1 km | MPC · JPL |
| 561252 | 2015 RH_{193} | — | October 6, 2004 | Kitt Peak | Spacewatch | · | 920 m | MPC · JPL |
| 561253 | 2015 RR_{193} | — | November 3, 2011 | Mount Lemmon | Mount Lemmon Survey | · | 1.1 km | MPC · JPL |
| 561254 | 2015 RK_{199} | — | September 21, 2008 | Kitt Peak | Spacewatch | · | 830 m | MPC · JPL |
| 561255 | 2015 RR_{199} | — | December 21, 2008 | Mount Lemmon | Mount Lemmon Survey | NYS | 870 m | MPC · JPL |
| 561256 | 2015 RW_{199} | — | July 28, 2011 | Haleakala | Pan-STARRS 1 | · | 1.1 km | MPC · JPL |
| 561257 | 2015 RY_{200} | — | September 24, 2011 | Haleakala | Pan-STARRS 1 | HNS | 710 m | MPC · JPL |
| 561258 | 2015 RZ_{201} | — | September 6, 2008 | Mount Lemmon | Mount Lemmon Survey | V | 440 m | MPC · JPL |
| 561259 | 2015 RK_{202} | — | January 29, 2003 | Apache Point | SDSS Collaboration | · | 700 m | MPC · JPL |
| 561260 | 2015 RV_{203} | — | August 12, 2015 | Haleakala | Pan-STARRS 1 | · | 550 m | MPC · JPL |
| 561261 | 2015 RG_{204} | — | August 12, 2015 | Haleakala | Pan-STARRS 1 | · | 980 m | MPC · JPL |
| 561262 | 2015 RP_{204} | — | October 1, 2008 | Catalina | CSS | · | 570 m | MPC · JPL |
| 561263 | 2015 RG_{210} | — | March 24, 2009 | Mount Lemmon | Mount Lemmon Survey | · | 1.2 km | MPC · JPL |
| 561264 | 2015 RJ_{214} | — | September 10, 2015 | Bergisch Gladbach | W. Bickel | EOS | 1.6 km | MPC · JPL |
| 561265 | 2015 RZ_{215} | — | January 10, 2013 | Haleakala | Pan-STARRS 1 | · | 990 m | MPC · JPL |
| 561266 | 2015 RP_{218} | — | January 18, 2009 | Kitt Peak | Spacewatch | · | 760 m | MPC · JPL |
| 561267 | 2015 RV_{221} | — | September 11, 2015 | Haleakala | Pan-STARRS 1 | V | 550 m | MPC · JPL |
| 561268 | 2015 RG_{222} | — | March 5, 2013 | Haleakala | Pan-STARRS 1 | · | 1.1 km | MPC · JPL |
| 561269 | 2015 RK_{226} | — | November 10, 2004 | Kitt Peak | Deep Ecliptic Survey | · | 860 m | MPC · JPL |
| 561270 | 2015 RK_{227} | — | December 1, 2008 | Mount Lemmon | Mount Lemmon Survey | · | 1.2 km | MPC · JPL |
| 561271 | 2015 RP_{228} | — | November 7, 2007 | Catalina | CSS | · | 1.1 km | MPC · JPL |
| 561272 | 2015 RV_{228} | — | September 13, 1996 | Kitt Peak | Spacewatch | V | 500 m | MPC · JPL |
| 561273 | 2015 RM_{229} | — | September 11, 2015 | Haleakala | Pan-STARRS 1 | · | 850 m | MPC · JPL |
| 561274 | 2015 RL_{232} | — | November 24, 2011 | Mount Lemmon | Mount Lemmon Survey | HOF | 2.1 km | MPC · JPL |
| 561275 | 2015 RV_{234} | — | December 26, 2011 | Kitt Peak | Spacewatch | · | 1.5 km | MPC · JPL |
| 561276 | 2015 RB_{236} | — | May 22, 2001 | Cerro Tololo | Deep Ecliptic Survey | · | 1.7 km | MPC · JPL |
| 561277 | 2015 RS_{236} | — | December 6, 2000 | Kitt Peak | Spacewatch | · | 1.1 km | MPC · JPL |
| 561278 | 2015 RM_{237} | — | January 19, 2012 | Haleakala | Pan-STARRS 1 | · | 1.1 km | MPC · JPL |
| 561279 | 2015 RR_{237} | — | September 11, 2015 | Haleakala | Pan-STARRS 1 | · | 960 m | MPC · JPL |
| 561280 | 2015 RU_{238} | — | February 10, 2008 | Catalina | CSS | · | 1.6 km | MPC · JPL |
| 561281 | 2015 RN_{239} | — | December 20, 2007 | Kitt Peak | Spacewatch | · | 1.1 km | MPC · JPL |
| 561282 | 2015 RR_{239} | — | November 30, 2003 | Kitt Peak | Spacewatch | EUN | 870 m | MPC · JPL |
| 561283 | 2015 RC_{240} | — | August 12, 2015 | Haleakala | Pan-STARRS 1 | · | 1.3 km | MPC · JPL |
| 561284 | 2015 RN_{242} | — | April 17, 2013 | Haleakala | Pan-STARRS 1 | EUN | 1.1 km | MPC · JPL |
| 561285 | 2015 RR_{242} | — | October 23, 2011 | Haleakala | Pan-STARRS 1 | · | 1.0 km | MPC · JPL |
| 561286 | 2015 RX_{242} | — | March 12, 2013 | Kitt Peak | Spacewatch | HNS | 1 km | MPC · JPL |
| 561287 | 2015 RX_{244} | — | December 3, 2004 | Kitt Peak | Spacewatch | · | 1.1 km | MPC · JPL |
| 561288 | 2015 RY_{244} | — | May 21, 2014 | Haleakala | Pan-STARRS 1 | · | 1.4 km | MPC · JPL |
| 561289 | 2015 RA_{253} | — | September 9, 2015 | Haleakala | Pan-STARRS 1 | · | 1.9 km | MPC · JPL |
| 561290 | 2015 RV_{253} | — | January 26, 2006 | Kitt Peak | Spacewatch | MAS | 720 m | MPC · JPL |
| 561291 | 2015 RX_{255} | — | February 20, 2009 | Kitt Peak | Spacewatch | · | 990 m | MPC · JPL |
| 561292 | 2015 RM_{256} | — | November 8, 2007 | Kitt Peak | Spacewatch | · | 850 m | MPC · JPL |
| 561293 | 2015 RA_{257} | — | May 9, 2013 | Haleakala | Pan-STARRS 1 | · | 1.1 km | MPC · JPL |
| 561294 | 2015 RC_{257} | — | January 15, 2008 | Mount Lemmon | Mount Lemmon Survey | (5) | 890 m | MPC · JPL |
| 561295 | 2015 RG_{257} | — | April 10, 2013 | Haleakala | Pan-STARRS 1 | (5) | 1.0 km | MPC · JPL |
| 561296 | 2015 RH_{257} | — | December 14, 2007 | Mount Lemmon | Mount Lemmon Survey | · | 1.2 km | MPC · JPL |
| 561297 | 2015 RP_{258} | — | August 23, 2011 | Haleakala | Pan-STARRS 1 | · | 1.1 km | MPC · JPL |
| 561298 | 2015 RA_{260} | — | February 19, 2007 | Mount Lemmon | Mount Lemmon Survey | · | 710 m | MPC · JPL |
| 561299 | 2015 RB_{260} | — | December 23, 2012 | Haleakala | Pan-STARRS 1 | · | 1.1 km | MPC · JPL |
| 561300 | 2015 RG_{260} | — | March 5, 2002 | Apache Point | SDSS | · | 1.2 km | MPC · JPL |

== 561301–561400 ==
back to top

| Designation | | | Discovery | | | Properties | | Ref |
| Permanent | Provisional | Named after | Date | Site | Discoverer(s) | Category | Diam. | Ref |
|---|---|---|---|---|---|---|---|---|
| 561301 | 2015 RL_{260} | — | December 2, 2011 | ESA OGS | ESA OGS | (5) | 1.0 km | MPC · JPL |
| 561302 | 2015 RR_{260} | — | September 11, 2015 | Haleakala | Pan-STARRS 1 | · | 600 m | MPC · JPL |
| 561303 | 2015 RM_{261} | — | February 17, 2010 | Kitt Peak | Spacewatch | · | 650 m | MPC · JPL |
| 561304 | 2015 RR_{262} | — | November 13, 2010 | Mount Lemmon | Mount Lemmon Survey | · | 2.5 km | MPC · JPL |
| 561305 | 2015 RJ_{265} | — | September 9, 2015 | Haleakala | Pan-STARRS 1 | · | 1.4 km | MPC · JPL |
| 561306 | 2015 RU_{265} | — | October 22, 2006 | Kitt Peak | Spacewatch | · | 1.4 km | MPC · JPL |
| 561307 | 2015 RM_{267} | — | August 29, 2006 | Kitt Peak | Spacewatch | · | 1.2 km | MPC · JPL |
| 561308 | 2015 RT_{267} | — | October 23, 2011 | Kitt Peak | Spacewatch | · | 950 m | MPC · JPL |
| 561309 | 2015 RV_{267} | — | April 19, 2004 | Kitt Peak | Spacewatch | · | 1.6 km | MPC · JPL |
| 561310 | 2015 RT_{268} | — | October 26, 2011 | Haleakala | Pan-STARRS 1 | · | 800 m | MPC · JPL |
| 561311 | 2015 RU_{270} | — | September 18, 2010 | Kitt Peak | Spacewatch | · | 1.3 km | MPC · JPL |
| 561312 | 2015 RA_{276} | — | August 27, 2011 | Haleakala | Pan-STARRS 1 | · | 1 km | MPC · JPL |
| 561313 | 2015 RA_{277} | — | October 23, 2011 | Haleakala | Pan-STARRS 1 | · | 1.1 km | MPC · JPL |
| 561314 | 2015 RT_{281} | — | September 27, 2019 | Haleakala | Pan-STARRS 1 | · | 780 m | MPC · JPL |
| 561315 | 2015 RE_{283} | — | September 11, 2015 | Haleakala | Pan-STARRS 1 | · | 1.0 km | MPC · JPL |
| 561316 | 2015 RH_{283} | — | September 9, 2015 | Haleakala | Pan-STARRS 1 | HNS | 1.1 km | MPC · JPL |
| 561317 | 2015 RF_{289} | — | September 9, 2015 | Haleakala | Pan-STARRS 1 | · | 2.6 km | MPC · JPL |
| 561318 | 2015 RV_{317} | — | September 8, 2015 | Haleakala | Pan-STARRS 1 | · | 1.8 km | MPC · JPL |
| 561319 | 2015 RO_{318} | — | September 12, 2015 | Haleakala | Pan-STARRS 1 | · | 2.2 km | MPC · JPL |
| 561320 | 2015 RU_{325} | — | September 12, 2015 | Haleakala | Pan-STARRS 1 | HOF | 1.9 km | MPC · JPL |
| 561321 | 2015 SW_{4} | — | October 29, 2008 | Mount Lemmon | Mount Lemmon Survey | V | 660 m | MPC · JPL |
| 561322 | 2015 SF_{5} | — | September 24, 2006 | Anderson Mesa | LONEOS | · | 2.2 km | MPC · JPL |
| 561323 | 2015 SR_{5} | — | January 20, 2009 | Mount Lemmon | Mount Lemmon Survey | NYS | 1.3 km | MPC · JPL |
| 561324 | 2015 SG_{6} | — | January 20, 2009 | Mount Lemmon | Mount Lemmon Survey | · | 1.2 km | MPC · JPL |
| 561325 | 2015 SM_{7} | — | December 21, 2012 | Mount Lemmon | Mount Lemmon Survey | · | 1.2 km | MPC · JPL |
| 561326 | 2015 SU_{9} | — | June 5, 2014 | Haleakala | Pan-STARRS 1 | PHO | 1.0 km | MPC · JPL |
| 561327 | 2015 SB_{11} | — | September 22, 2008 | Mount Lemmon | Mount Lemmon Survey | · | 880 m | MPC · JPL |
| 561328 | 2015 SV_{11} | — | November 9, 2004 | Catalina | CSS | · | 1.0 km | MPC · JPL |
| 561329 | 2015 SY_{13} | — | August 23, 2004 | Kitt Peak | Spacewatch | · | 820 m | MPC · JPL |
| 561330 | 2015 ST_{14} | — | October 1, 2008 | Mount Lemmon | Mount Lemmon Survey | PHO | 770 m | MPC · JPL |
| 561331 | 2015 SS_{15} | — | August 3, 2008 | Wise | Polishook, D. | · | 700 m | MPC · JPL |
| 561332 | 2015 SX_{17} | — | December 5, 2005 | Mount Lemmon | Mount Lemmon Survey | · | 880 m | MPC · JPL |
| 561333 | 2015 SD_{18} | — | September 18, 2015 | Kitt Peak | Spacewatch | · | 1.1 km | MPC · JPL |
| 561334 | 2015 SK_{18} | — | December 1, 2005 | Mount Lemmon | Mount Lemmon Survey | · | 780 m | MPC · JPL |
| 561335 | 2015 SW_{18} | — | November 4, 2005 | Mount Lemmon | Mount Lemmon Survey | · | 840 m | MPC · JPL |
| 561336 | 2015 SQ_{19} | — | April 29, 2014 | Haleakala | Pan-STARRS 1 | · | 730 m | MPC · JPL |
| 561337 | 2015 SM_{20} | — | January 27, 2007 | Mount Lemmon | Mount Lemmon Survey | · | 710 m | MPC · JPL |
| 561338 | 2015 SG_{23} | — | July 19, 2006 | Mauna Kea | P. A. Wiegert, D. Subasinghe | · | 1.1 km | MPC · JPL |
| 561339 | 2015 SK_{23} | — | October 27, 2011 | Mount Lemmon | Mount Lemmon Survey | · | 1.1 km | MPC · JPL |
| 561340 | 2015 SO_{24} | — | September 19, 2015 | Haleakala | Pan-STARRS 1 | HNS | 1.0 km | MPC · JPL |
| 561341 | 2015 SS_{24} | — | November 4, 2004 | Kitt Peak | Spacewatch | · | 1.2 km | MPC · JPL |
| 561342 | 2015 SG_{25} | — | September 23, 2015 | Haleakala | Pan-STARRS 1 | · | 1.5 km | MPC · JPL |
| 561343 | 2015 SN_{25} | — | February 4, 2005 | Kitt Peak | Spacewatch | · | 1.2 km | MPC · JPL |
| 561344 | 2015 SP_{25} | — | March 19, 2010 | Mount Lemmon | Mount Lemmon Survey | · | 1.4 km | MPC · JPL |
| 561345 | 2015 SK_{26} | — | September 19, 2015 | Haleakala | Pan-STARRS 1 | KON | 2.0 km | MPC · JPL |
| 561346 | 2015 SO_{26} | — | September 19, 2015 | Haleakala | Pan-STARRS 1 | · | 1.4 km | MPC · JPL |
| 561347 | 2015 SQ_{26} | — | September 20, 2015 | Mount Lemmon | Mount Lemmon Survey | · | 960 m | MPC · JPL |
| 561348 | 2015 SG_{29} | — | November 11, 2007 | Mount Lemmon | Mount Lemmon Survey | · | 1.3 km | MPC · JPL |
| 561349 | 2015 SQ_{29} | — | November 25, 2011 | Haleakala | Pan-STARRS 1 | · | 1.1 km | MPC · JPL |
| 561350 | 2015 SA_{30} | — | February 13, 2008 | Catalina | CSS | JUN | 1.0 km | MPC · JPL |
| 561351 | 2015 SP_{30} | — | April 9, 2010 | Kitt Peak | Spacewatch | · | 1.3 km | MPC · JPL |
| 561352 | 2015 TS | — | August 24, 2001 | Haleakala | NEAT | · | 980 m | MPC · JPL |
| 561353 | 2015 TT | — | March 10, 2008 | Kitt Peak | Spacewatch | · | 1.3 km | MPC · JPL |
| 561354 | 2015 TF_{2} | — | November 30, 2005 | Mount Lemmon | Mount Lemmon Survey | V | 510 m | MPC · JPL |
| 561355 | 2015 TQ_{3} | — | July 16, 2004 | Cerro Tololo | Deep Ecliptic Survey | · | 930 m | MPC · JPL |
| 561356 | 2015 TT_{7} | — | October 2, 2015 | Mount Lemmon | Mount Lemmon Survey | · | 750 m | MPC · JPL |
| 561357 | 2015 TN_{8} | — | April 2, 2014 | Mount Lemmon | Mount Lemmon Survey | · | 1.1 km | MPC · JPL |
| 561358 | 2015 TT_{8} | — | December 2, 2010 | Mount Lemmon | Mount Lemmon Survey | EOS | 1.6 km | MPC · JPL |
| 561359 | 2015 TA_{12} | — | March 14, 2011 | Mount Lemmon | Mount Lemmon Survey | · | 690 m | MPC · JPL |
| 561360 | 2015 TD_{12} | — | November 22, 2008 | Kitt Peak | Spacewatch | · | 1.3 km | MPC · JPL |
| 561361 | 2015 TP_{12} | — | November 6, 2008 | Mount Lemmon | Mount Lemmon Survey | · | 1 km | MPC · JPL |
| 561362 | 2015 TF_{14} | — | November 1, 2005 | Mount Lemmon | Mount Lemmon Survey | EOS | 1.5 km | MPC · JPL |
| 561363 | 2015 TR_{15} | — | June 13, 2005 | Mount Lemmon | Mount Lemmon Survey | · | 580 m | MPC · JPL |
| 561364 | 2015 TW_{15} | — | October 14, 2012 | Kitt Peak | Spacewatch | · | 710 m | MPC · JPL |
| 561365 | 2015 TY_{15} | — | November 23, 2012 | Kitt Peak | Spacewatch | · | 1.1 km | MPC · JPL |
| 561366 | 2015 TA_{16} | — | January 7, 2010 | Mount Lemmon | Mount Lemmon Survey | V | 640 m | MPC · JPL |
| 561367 | 2015 TO_{16} | — | July 4, 2005 | Palomar | NEAT | · | 720 m | MPC · JPL |
| 561368 | 2015 TK_{18} | — | June 5, 2014 | Haleakala | Pan-STARRS 1 | TIR | 2.6 km | MPC · JPL |
| 561369 | 2015 TU_{18} | — | January 12, 2008 | Catalina | CSS | · | 1.9 km | MPC · JPL |
| 561370 | 2015 TQ_{19} | — | December 31, 2007 | Mount Lemmon | Mount Lemmon Survey | · | 1.4 km | MPC · JPL |
| 561371 | 2015 TZ_{19} | — | January 10, 2013 | Haleakala | Pan-STARRS 1 | · | 1.1 km | MPC · JPL |
| 561372 | 2015 TM_{20} | — | May 24, 2015 | Haleakala | Pan-STARRS 1 | · | 1.4 km | MPC · JPL |
| 561373 | 2015 TS_{20} | — | January 8, 2007 | Catalina | CSS | · | 2.1 km | MPC · JPL |
| 561374 | 2015 TS_{21} | — | April 1, 2011 | Mount Lemmon | Mount Lemmon Survey | · | 640 m | MPC · JPL |
| 561375 | 2015 TU_{21} | — | December 17, 2007 | Catalina | CSS | · | 1.7 km | MPC · JPL |
| 561376 | 2015 TD_{23} | — | March 2, 2009 | Mount Lemmon | Mount Lemmon Survey | · | 1.9 km | MPC · JPL |
| 561377 | 2015 TG_{23} | — | October 16, 2002 | Palomar | NEAT | · | 1.5 km | MPC · JPL |
| 561378 | 2015 TG_{26} | — | October 7, 2004 | Kitt Peak | Spacewatch | · | 890 m | MPC · JPL |
| 561379 | 2015 TL_{26} | — | March 19, 2004 | Socorro | LINEAR | · | 730 m | MPC · JPL |
| 561380 | 2015 TZ_{30} | — | May 24, 2014 | Haleakala | Pan-STARRS 1 | · | 1.8 km | MPC · JPL |
| 561381 | 2015 TH_{36} | — | November 13, 2012 | Mount Lemmon | Mount Lemmon Survey | · | 830 m | MPC · JPL |
| 561382 | 2015 TL_{39} | — | December 27, 2011 | Kitt Peak | Spacewatch | · | 2.1 km | MPC · JPL |
| 561383 | 2015 TR_{40} | — | December 1, 2005 | Kitt Peak | Spacewatch | VER | 2.7 km | MPC · JPL |
| 561384 | 2015 TS_{42} | — | November 30, 2008 | Kitt Peak | Spacewatch | · | 1.1 km | MPC · JPL |
| 561385 | 2015 TD_{49} | — | January 17, 1994 | Kitt Peak | Spacewatch | V | 610 m | MPC · JPL |
| 561386 | 2015 TF_{49} | — | October 30, 2008 | Mount Lemmon | Mount Lemmon Survey | · | 1.2 km | MPC · JPL |
| 561387 | 2015 TD_{50} | — | September 23, 2008 | Kitt Peak | Spacewatch | · | 1.1 km | MPC · JPL |
| 561388 | 2015 TD_{52} | — | October 27, 2005 | Mount Lemmon | Mount Lemmon Survey | · | 890 m | MPC · JPL |
| 561389 | 2015 TF_{53} | — | March 4, 2013 | Haleakala | Pan-STARRS 1 | · | 2.8 km | MPC · JPL |
| 561390 | 2015 TW_{53} | — | August 10, 2010 | Kitt Peak | Spacewatch | · | 1.4 km | MPC · JPL |
| 561391 | 2015 TK_{54} | — | February 22, 2003 | Palomar | NEAT | · | 1.0 km | MPC · JPL |
| 561392 | 2015 TW_{58} | — | October 15, 2004 | Mount Lemmon | Mount Lemmon Survey | · | 930 m | MPC · JPL |
| 561393 | 2015 TD_{59} | — | February 9, 2013 | Haleakala | Pan-STARRS 1 | PHO | 800 m | MPC · JPL |
| 561394 | 2015 TY_{60} | — | January 22, 2013 | Mount Lemmon | Mount Lemmon Survey | · | 1.1 km | MPC · JPL |
| 561395 | 2015 TU_{66} | — | October 9, 2007 | Mount Lemmon | Mount Lemmon Survey | V | 600 m | MPC · JPL |
| 561396 | 2015 TM_{74} | — | February 3, 2012 | Mount Lemmon | Mount Lemmon Survey | · | 1.3 km | MPC · JPL |
| 561397 | 2015 TV_{74} | — | September 27, 2011 | Mount Lemmon | Mount Lemmon Survey | · | 930 m | MPC · JPL |
| 561398 | 2015 TZ_{76} | — | March 26, 2007 | Kitt Peak | Spacewatch | · | 930 m | MPC · JPL |
| 561399 | 2015 TO_{77} | — | May 10, 2014 | Haleakala | Pan-STARRS 1 | · | 1.2 km | MPC · JPL |
| 561400 | 2015 TU_{77} | — | October 25, 2011 | Haleakala | Pan-STARRS 1 | · | 1.0 km | MPC · JPL |

== 561401–561500 ==
back to top

| Designation | | | Discovery | | | Properties | | Ref |
| Permanent | Provisional | Named after | Date | Site | Discoverer(s) | Category | Diam. | Ref |
|---|---|---|---|---|---|---|---|---|
| 561401 | 2015 TB_{78} | — | October 15, 1998 | Kitt Peak | Spacewatch | (5) | 1.1 km | MPC · JPL |
| 561402 | 2015 TN_{79} | — | October 8, 2015 | Haleakala | Pan-STARRS 1 | · | 1.5 km | MPC · JPL |
| 561403 | 2015 TV_{79} | — | March 18, 2010 | Mount Lemmon | Mount Lemmon Survey | · | 870 m | MPC · JPL |
| 561404 | 2015 TJ_{80} | — | January 25, 2012 | Haleakala | Pan-STARRS 1 | · | 2.0 km | MPC · JPL |
| 561405 | 2015 TC_{81} | — | March 24, 2006 | Mount Lemmon | Mount Lemmon Survey | · | 1.3 km | MPC · JPL |
| 561406 | 2015 TR_{81} | — | October 24, 2011 | Kitt Peak | Spacewatch | (5) | 990 m | MPC · JPL |
| 561407 | 2015 TN_{82} | — | October 2, 2008 | Kitt Peak | Spacewatch | · | 690 m | MPC · JPL |
| 561408 | 2015 TE_{83} | — | March 31, 2009 | Kitt Peak | Spacewatch | · | 1.8 km | MPC · JPL |
| 561409 | 2015 TL_{84} | — | September 21, 2011 | Haleakala | Pan-STARRS 1 | · | 970 m | MPC · JPL |
| 561410 | 2015 TA_{85} | — | April 19, 2007 | Mount Lemmon | Mount Lemmon Survey | NYS | 1.0 km | MPC · JPL |
| 561411 | 2015 TY_{86} | — | October 8, 2015 | Haleakala | Pan-STARRS 1 | · | 1.3 km | MPC · JPL |
| 561412 | 2015 TD_{87} | — | November 5, 2007 | Mount Lemmon | Mount Lemmon Survey | · | 790 m | MPC · JPL |
| 561413 | 2015 TS_{87} | — | November 5, 2004 | Palomar | NEAT | · | 1.3 km | MPC · JPL |
| 561414 | 2015 TU_{87} | — | February 28, 2014 | Haleakala | Pan-STARRS 1 | · | 600 m | MPC · JPL |
| 561415 | 2015 TV_{87} | — | January 10, 2013 | Haleakala | Pan-STARRS 1 | · | 1.1 km | MPC · JPL |
| 561416 | 2015 TD_{88} | — | March 19, 2010 | Mount Lemmon | Mount Lemmon Survey | · | 1.1 km | MPC · JPL |
| 561417 | 2015 TF_{91} | — | October 25, 2011 | Haleakala | Pan-STARRS 1 | (5) | 1.0 km | MPC · JPL |
| 561418 | 2015 TY_{92} | — | July 25, 2014 | Haleakala | Pan-STARRS 1 | (5) | 1.3 km | MPC · JPL |
| 561419 | 2015 TB_{93} | — | October 8, 2015 | Haleakala | Pan-STARRS 1 | · | 1.6 km | MPC · JPL |
| 561420 | 2015 TV_{93} | — | December 1, 2011 | Haleakala | Pan-STARRS 1 | EUN | 1.0 km | MPC · JPL |
| 561421 | 2015 TE_{95} | — | May 6, 2010 | Mount Lemmon | Mount Lemmon Survey | · | 1.4 km | MPC · JPL |
| 561422 | 2015 TT_{97} | — | October 3, 1996 | Xinglong | SCAP | MAS | 740 m | MPC · JPL |
| 561423 | 2015 TC_{100} | — | May 11, 2005 | Mount Lemmon | Mount Lemmon Survey | · | 1.6 km | MPC · JPL |
| 561424 | 2015 TF_{101} | — | December 31, 2011 | Mayhill-ISON | L. Elenin | · | 1.4 km | MPC · JPL |
| 561425 | 2015 TN_{101} | — | January 15, 2008 | Mount Lemmon | Mount Lemmon Survey | · | 1.0 km | MPC · JPL |
| 561426 | 2015 TX_{102} | — | October 8, 2015 | Haleakala | Pan-STARRS 1 | · | 790 m | MPC · JPL |
| 561427 | 2015 TX_{104} | — | March 8, 2005 | Mount Lemmon | Mount Lemmon Survey | · | 1.2 km | MPC · JPL |
| 561428 | 2015 TJ_{105} | — | October 8, 2015 | Haleakala | Pan-STARRS 1 | · | 1.4 km | MPC · JPL |
| 561429 | 2015 TS_{105} | — | October 23, 2011 | Haleakala | Pan-STARRS 1 | · | 860 m | MPC · JPL |
| 561430 | 2015 TW_{105} | — | October 8, 2015 | Haleakala | Pan-STARRS 1 | · | 1.4 km | MPC · JPL |
| 561431 | 2015 TN_{106} | — | April 9, 2013 | Haleakala | Pan-STARRS 1 | · | 1.0 km | MPC · JPL |
| 561432 | 2015 TR_{107} | — | September 28, 1998 | Kitt Peak | Spacewatch | · | 1.2 km | MPC · JPL |
| 561433 | 2015 TS_{107} | — | September 19, 1998 | Apache Point | SDSS Collaboration | KON | 1.8 km | MPC · JPL |
| 561434 | 2015 TA_{109} | — | May 7, 2014 | Haleakala | Pan-STARRS 1 | · | 1.1 km | MPC · JPL |
| 561435 | 2015 TT_{109} | — | September 25, 2011 | Haleakala | Pan-STARRS 1 | · | 1.3 km | MPC · JPL |
| 561436 | 2015 TF_{111} | — | November 16, 2011 | Kitt Peak | Spacewatch | · | 870 m | MPC · JPL |
| 561437 | 2015 TR_{111} | — | March 12, 2005 | Kitt Peak | Deep Ecliptic Survey | · | 1.1 km | MPC · JPL |
| 561438 | 2015 TG_{112} | — | November 17, 2007 | Kitt Peak | Spacewatch | · | 990 m | MPC · JPL |
| 561439 | 2015 TQ_{112} | — | June 24, 2014 | Haleakala | Pan-STARRS 1 | MAR | 980 m | MPC · JPL |
| 561440 | 2015 TV_{112} | — | September 25, 2006 | Kitt Peak | Spacewatch | · | 1.1 km | MPC · JPL |
| 561441 | 2015 TB_{113} | — | October 8, 2015 | Haleakala | Pan-STARRS 1 | · | 1.2 km | MPC · JPL |
| 561442 | 2015 TF_{113} | — | September 18, 2011 | Catalina | CSS | · | 1.1 km | MPC · JPL |
| 561443 | 2015 TN_{113} | — | November 19, 2006 | Catalina | CSS | · | 1.6 km | MPC · JPL |
| 561444 | 2015 TG_{114} | — | October 8, 2015 | Haleakala | Pan-STARRS 1 | · | 1.0 km | MPC · JPL |
| 561445 | 2015 TH_{115} | — | October 8, 2015 | Haleakala | Pan-STARRS 1 | ADE | 1.5 km | MPC · JPL |
| 561446 | 2015 TN_{115} | — | May 6, 2014 | Haleakala | Pan-STARRS 1 | PHO | 830 m | MPC · JPL |
| 561447 | 2015 TL_{117} | — | June 30, 2014 | Haleakala | Pan-STARRS 1 | · | 1.3 km | MPC · JPL |
| 561448 | 2015 TC_{118} | — | February 27, 2008 | Mount Lemmon | Mount Lemmon Survey | · | 940 m | MPC · JPL |
| 561449 | 2015 TF_{118} | — | October 8, 2015 | Haleakala | Pan-STARRS 1 | · | 1.3 km | MPC · JPL |
| 561450 | 2015 TG_{118} | — | December 29, 2003 | Kitt Peak | Spacewatch | MAR | 1.1 km | MPC · JPL |
| 561451 | 2015 TL_{118} | — | September 19, 2015 | Haleakala | Pan-STARRS 1 | HNS | 930 m | MPC · JPL |
| 561452 | 2015 TO_{118} | — | May 12, 2013 | Haleakala | Pan-STARRS 1 | HNS | 910 m | MPC · JPL |
| 561453 | 2015 TL_{119} | — | June 16, 2014 | Mount Lemmon | Mount Lemmon Survey | · | 1.3 km | MPC · JPL |
| 561454 | 2015 TU_{119} | — | February 21, 2012 | Mount Lemmon | Mount Lemmon Survey | · | 1.2 km | MPC · JPL |
| 561455 | 2015 TP_{120} | — | March 30, 2008 | Kitt Peak | Spacewatch | · | 2.2 km | MPC · JPL |
| 561456 | 2015 TS_{121} | — | October 8, 2015 | Haleakala | Pan-STARRS 1 | · | 990 m | MPC · JPL |
| 561457 | 2015 TD_{122} | — | September 11, 2015 | Haleakala | Pan-STARRS 1 | · | 580 m | MPC · JPL |
| 561458 | 2015 TK_{122} | — | February 28, 2014 | Haleakala | Pan-STARRS 1 | · | 630 m | MPC · JPL |
| 561459 | 2015 TM_{123} | — | August 8, 2004 | Palomar | NEAT | · | 1.1 km | MPC · JPL |
| 561460 | 2015 TW_{125} | — | October 26, 2011 | Haleakala | Pan-STARRS 1 | · | 990 m | MPC · JPL |
| 561461 | 2015 TD_{127} | — | August 21, 2015 | Haleakala | Pan-STARRS 1 | · | 1.7 km | MPC · JPL |
| 561462 | 2015 TL_{127} | — | November 16, 2011 | Kitt Peak | Spacewatch | · | 1.7 km | MPC · JPL |
| 561463 | 2015 TF_{129} | — | January 22, 2004 | Socorro | LINEAR | RAF | 590 m | MPC · JPL |
| 561464 | 2015 TW_{129} | — | April 18, 2009 | Kitt Peak | Spacewatch | · | 930 m | MPC · JPL |
| 561465 | 2015 TS_{130} | — | October 8, 2015 | Haleakala | Pan-STARRS 1 | V | 510 m | MPC · JPL |
| 561466 | 2015 TC_{131} | — | July 26, 2011 | Haleakala | Pan-STARRS 1 | V | 410 m | MPC · JPL |
| 561467 | 2015 TT_{131} | — | July 27, 2011 | Haleakala | Pan-STARRS 1 | · | 810 m | MPC · JPL |
| 561468 | 2015 TX_{131} | — | February 14, 2010 | Mount Lemmon | Mount Lemmon Survey | · | 730 m | MPC · JPL |
| 561469 | 2015 TP_{132} | — | September 18, 2011 | Mount Lemmon | Mount Lemmon Survey | · | 1.1 km | MPC · JPL |
| 561470 | 2015 TT_{136} | — | September 12, 2015 | Haleakala | Pan-STARRS 1 | · | 1.9 km | MPC · JPL |
| 561471 | 2015 TE_{142} | — | October 8, 2015 | Haleakala | Pan-STARRS 1 | · | 1.2 km | MPC · JPL |
| 561472 | 2015 TF_{143} | — | January 16, 2013 | Haleakala | Pan-STARRS 1 | · | 1.5 km | MPC · JPL |
| 561473 | 2015 TV_{146} | — | August 27, 2011 | Haleakala | Pan-STARRS 1 | NYS | 990 m | MPC · JPL |
| 561474 | 2015 TO_{147} | — | September 18, 2004 | Socorro | LINEAR | · | 1.1 km | MPC · JPL |
| 561475 | 2015 TY_{147} | — | March 2, 2009 | Mount Lemmon | Mount Lemmon Survey | · | 1.5 km | MPC · JPL |
| 561476 | 2015 TZ_{147} | — | September 11, 2007 | Mount Lemmon | Mount Lemmon Survey | · | 900 m | MPC · JPL |
| 561477 | 2015 TB_{150} | — | January 5, 2006 | Kitt Peak | Spacewatch | · | 530 m | MPC · JPL |
| 561478 | 2015 TF_{154} | — | January 17, 2013 | Haleakala | Pan-STARRS 1 | · | 780 m | MPC · JPL |
| 561479 | 2015 TD_{155} | — | March 28, 2011 | Kitt Peak | Spacewatch | · | 550 m | MPC · JPL |
| 561480 | 2015 TJ_{156} | — | September 20, 2011 | Haleakala | Pan-STARRS 1 | CLA | 1.4 km | MPC · JPL |
| 561481 | 2015 TW_{157} | — | February 3, 2013 | Haleakala | Pan-STARRS 1 | NYS | 820 m | MPC · JPL |
| 561482 | 2015 TZ_{157} | — | August 25, 2004 | Kitt Peak | Spacewatch | · | 900 m | MPC · JPL |
| 561483 | 2015 TJ_{158} | — | April 12, 2004 | Palomar | NEAT | · | 840 m | MPC · JPL |
| 561484 | 2015 TQ_{158} | — | March 12, 2002 | Kitt Peak | Spacewatch | MAS | 660 m | MPC · JPL |
| 561485 | 2015 TQ_{159} | — | December 21, 2008 | Kitt Peak | Spacewatch | · | 890 m | MPC · JPL |
| 561486 | 2015 TH_{161} | — | October 1, 2008 | Kitt Peak | Spacewatch | · | 810 m | MPC · JPL |
| 561487 | 2015 TX_{161} | — | October 20, 1999 | Kitt Peak | Spacewatch | · | 590 m | MPC · JPL |
| 561488 | 2015 TZ_{163} | — | October 22, 2012 | Haleakala | Pan-STARRS 1 | · | 750 m | MPC · JPL |
| 561489 | 2015 TP_{166} | — | December 31, 2008 | Mount Lemmon | Mount Lemmon Survey | NYS | 840 m | MPC · JPL |
| 561490 Tonyforward | 2015 TH_{168} | Tonyforward | September 26, 2011 | Mayhill | Falla, N. | · | 1.0 km | MPC · JPL |
| 561491 | 2015 TY_{168} | — | October 21, 2011 | Mount Lemmon | Mount Lemmon Survey | · | 1.0 km | MPC · JPL |
| 561492 | 2015 TT_{169} | — | March 17, 2009 | Kitt Peak | Spacewatch | · | 1.2 km | MPC · JPL |
| 561493 | 2015 TJ_{172} | — | October 9, 2015 | Haleakala | Pan-STARRS 1 | · | 760 m | MPC · JPL |
| 561494 | 2015 TL_{172} | — | March 26, 2007 | Kitt Peak | Spacewatch | · | 680 m | MPC · JPL |
| 561495 | 2015 TR_{173} | — | August 30, 2011 | Haleakala | Pan-STARRS 1 | · | 950 m | MPC · JPL |
| 561496 | 2015 TX_{174} | — | February 14, 2013 | Haleakala | Pan-STARRS 1 | · | 1.3 km | MPC · JPL |
| 561497 | 2015 TC_{176} | — | April 19, 2006 | Kitt Peak | Spacewatch | V | 610 m | MPC · JPL |
| 561498 | 2015 TD_{176} | — | February 16, 2002 | Palomar | NEAT | V | 560 m | MPC · JPL |
| 561499 | 2015 TY_{176} | — | October 23, 2011 | Haleakala | Pan-STARRS 1 | · | 840 m | MPC · JPL |
| 561500 | 2015 TM_{179} | — | October 26, 2011 | Haleakala | Pan-STARRS 1 | MAR | 730 m | MPC · JPL |

== 561501–561600 ==
back to top

| Designation | | | Discovery | | | Properties | | Ref |
| Permanent | Provisional | Named after | Date | Site | Discoverer(s) | Category | Diam. | Ref |
|---|---|---|---|---|---|---|---|---|
| 561501 | 2015 TN_{179} | — | December 30, 2005 | Kitt Peak | Spacewatch | · | 670 m | MPC · JPL |
| 561502 | 2015 TH_{180} | — | September 30, 1998 | Kitt Peak | Spacewatch | · | 1.4 km | MPC · JPL |
| 561503 | 2015 TO_{181} | — | December 19, 2012 | Oukaïmeden | M. Ory | · | 1.0 km | MPC · JPL |
| 561504 | 2015 TV_{183} | — | October 25, 2005 | Mount Lemmon | Mount Lemmon Survey | · | 640 m | MPC · JPL |
| 561505 | 2015 TW_{183} | — | August 21, 2007 | Siding Spring | SSS | · | 1.5 km | MPC · JPL |
| 561506 | 2015 TE_{184} | — | January 17, 2013 | Mount Lemmon | Mount Lemmon Survey | · | 1.1 km | MPC · JPL |
| 561507 | 2015 TS_{186} | — | October 9, 2015 | Haleakala | Pan-STARRS 1 | EUN | 780 m | MPC · JPL |
| 561508 | 2015 TZ_{189} | — | September 1, 2011 | La Sagra | OAM | · | 1.4 km | MPC · JPL |
| 561509 | 2015 TA_{190} | — | February 22, 2009 | Kitt Peak | Spacewatch | · | 1.5 km | MPC · JPL |
| 561510 | 2015 TM_{191} | — | September 6, 2008 | Mount Lemmon | Mount Lemmon Survey | · | 720 m | MPC · JPL |
| 561511 | 2015 TP_{192} | — | July 28, 2011 | Haleakala | Pan-STARRS 1 | · | 1.2 km | MPC · JPL |
| 561512 | 2015 TQ_{193} | — | July 25, 2011 | Haleakala | Pan-STARRS 1 | · | 860 m | MPC · JPL |
| 561513 | 2015 TF_{194} | — | August 10, 2007 | Kitt Peak | Spacewatch | · | 1.1 km | MPC · JPL |
| 561514 | 2015 TX_{196} | — | May 20, 2014 | Haleakala | Pan-STARRS 1 | · | 1.1 km | MPC · JPL |
| 561515 | 2015 TC_{197} | — | July 26, 2015 | Haleakala | Pan-STARRS 2 | V | 570 m | MPC · JPL |
| 561516 | 2015 TB_{198} | — | October 1, 2002 | Anderson Mesa | LONEOS | · | 1.7 km | MPC · JPL |
| 561517 | 2015 TE_{198} | — | November 20, 2004 | Kitt Peak | Spacewatch | · | 1.2 km | MPC · JPL |
| 561518 | 2015 TO_{198} | — | October 9, 2015 | Catalina | CSS | · | 1.1 km | MPC · JPL |
| 561519 | 2015 TQ_{198} | — | January 12, 2008 | Catalina | CSS | · | 1.3 km | MPC · JPL |
| 561520 | 2015 TM_{199} | — | September 11, 1996 | Kitt Peak | Spacewatch | NYS | 960 m | MPC · JPL |
| 561521 | 2015 TS_{199} | — | August 26, 2005 | Anderson Mesa | LONEOS | · | 710 m | MPC · JPL |
| 561522 | 2015 TO_{200} | — | May 4, 2014 | Haleakala | Pan-STARRS 1 | PHO | 700 m | MPC · JPL |
| 561523 | 2015 TT_{200} | — | September 9, 2004 | Anderson Mesa | LONEOS | · | 900 m | MPC · JPL |
| 561524 | 2015 TU_{200} | — | August 23, 2011 | Haleakala | Pan-STARRS 1 | NYS | 1.0 km | MPC · JPL |
| 561525 | 2015 TJ_{201} | — | October 25, 1997 | Kitt Peak | Spacewatch | V | 580 m | MPC · JPL |
| 561526 | 2015 TC_{202} | — | September 7, 2004 | Kitt Peak | Spacewatch | ERI | 1.5 km | MPC · JPL |
| 561527 | 2015 TQ_{202} | — | March 11, 2005 | Kitt Peak | Deep Ecliptic Survey | · | 1.4 km | MPC · JPL |
| 561528 | 2015 TV_{202} | — | September 8, 2015 | XuYi | PMO NEO Survey Program | · | 1.3 km | MPC · JPL |
| 561529 | 2015 TC_{203} | — | November 18, 2011 | Mount Lemmon | Mount Lemmon Survey | EUN | 1.1 km | MPC · JPL |
| 561530 | 2015 TD_{203} | — | November 23, 2011 | Mount Lemmon | Mount Lemmon Survey | · | 1.2 km | MPC · JPL |
| 561531 | 2015 TT_{203} | — | October 21, 2008 | Kitt Peak | Spacewatch | · | 960 m | MPC · JPL |
| 561532 | 2015 TX_{203} | — | September 24, 2008 | Mount Lemmon | Mount Lemmon Survey | · | 950 m | MPC · JPL |
| 561533 | 2015 TA_{204} | — | April 30, 2009 | Kitt Peak | Spacewatch | · | 1.4 km | MPC · JPL |
| 561534 | 2015 TZ_{204} | — | January 13, 2008 | Catalina | CSS | · | 1.8 km | MPC · JPL |
| 561535 | 2015 TA_{205} | — | September 25, 2011 | Haleakala | Pan-STARRS 1 | · | 1.4 km | MPC · JPL |
| 561536 | 2015 TO_{205} | — | February 20, 2002 | Kitt Peak | Spacewatch | · | 1.4 km | MPC · JPL |
| 561537 | 2015 TX_{205} | — | October 2, 2011 | Piszkéstető | K. Sárneczky | · | 1.2 km | MPC · JPL |
| 561538 | 2015 TJ_{206} | — | April 6, 2013 | Mayhill-ISON | L. Elenin | · | 2.0 km | MPC · JPL |
| 561539 | 2015 TJ_{207} | — | October 9, 2010 | Mount Lemmon | Mount Lemmon Survey | · | 2.1 km | MPC · JPL |
| 561540 | 2015 TF_{208} | — | November 30, 2011 | Catalina | CSS | · | 1.4 km | MPC · JPL |
| 561541 | 2015 TW_{208} | — | April 22, 2009 | Mount Lemmon | Mount Lemmon Survey | · | 1.8 km | MPC · JPL |
| 561542 | 2015 TL_{210} | — | August 24, 2001 | Kitt Peak | Spacewatch | · | 580 m | MPC · JPL |
| 561543 | 2015 TB_{212} | — | October 25, 2005 | Mount Lemmon | Mount Lemmon Survey | · | 820 m | MPC · JPL |
| 561544 | 2015 TF_{215} | — | February 22, 2014 | Kitt Peak | Spacewatch | (2076) | 540 m | MPC · JPL |
| 561545 | 2015 TT_{215} | — | September 25, 2008 | Kitt Peak | Spacewatch | · | 700 m | MPC · JPL |
| 561546 | 2015 TW_{217} | — | April 5, 2003 | Kitt Peak | Spacewatch | · | 1.0 km | MPC · JPL |
| 561547 | 2015 TA_{218} | — | March 24, 2001 | Kitt Peak | Spacewatch | (1298) | 3.0 km | MPC · JPL |
| 561548 | 2015 TB_{218} | — | March 12, 2000 | Kitt Peak | Spacewatch | · | 620 m | MPC · JPL |
| 561549 | 2015 TE_{223} | — | October 23, 2011 | Haleakala | Pan-STARRS 1 | · | 1.2 km | MPC · JPL |
| 561550 | 2015 TL_{223} | — | September 18, 2015 | Mount Lemmon | Mount Lemmon Survey | · | 890 m | MPC · JPL |
| 561551 | 2015 TU_{223} | — | December 2, 2004 | Catalina | CSS | · | 1.2 km | MPC · JPL |
| 561552 | 2015 TL_{224} | — | October 10, 2015 | Space Surveillance | Space Surveillance Telescope | · | 1.3 km | MPC · JPL |
| 561553 | 2015 TY_{226} | — | December 29, 2008 | Kitt Peak | Spacewatch | PHO | 960 m | MPC · JPL |
| 561554 | 2015 TV_{230} | — | June 19, 2010 | Mount Lemmon | Mount Lemmon Survey | MAR | 1.1 km | MPC · JPL |
| 561555 | 2015 TF_{231} | — | August 27, 2006 | Kitt Peak | Spacewatch | ADE | 1.8 km | MPC · JPL |
| 561556 | 2015 TL_{234} | — | December 28, 2003 | Kitt Peak | Spacewatch | BRG | 1.3 km | MPC · JPL |
| 561557 | 2015 TQ_{238} | — | February 28, 2014 | Haleakala | Pan-STARRS 1 | · | 810 m | MPC · JPL |
| 561558 | 2015 TU_{239} | — | March 9, 2000 | Kitt Peak | Spacewatch | BAR | 1.2 km | MPC · JPL |
| 561559 | 2015 TH_{240} | — | July 2, 2008 | Kitt Peak | Spacewatch | · | 880 m | MPC · JPL |
| 561560 | 2015 TT_{240} | — | July 25, 2005 | Siding Spring | SSS | · | 680 m | MPC · JPL |
| 561561 | 2015 TW_{240} | — | December 10, 2005 | Kitt Peak | Spacewatch | · | 1.1 km | MPC · JPL |
| 561562 | 2015 TH_{241} | — | September 7, 2004 | Kitt Peak | Spacewatch | · | 1.1 km | MPC · JPL |
| 561563 | 2015 TK_{243} | — | October 10, 2008 | Mount Lemmon | Mount Lemmon Survey | · | 980 m | MPC · JPL |
| 561564 | 2015 TJ_{247} | — | April 4, 2010 | Kitt Peak | Spacewatch | · | 1.5 km | MPC · JPL |
| 561565 | 2015 TQ_{253} | — | April 9, 2010 | Kitt Peak | Spacewatch | · | 1.1 km | MPC · JPL |
| 561566 | 2015 TJ_{254} | — | November 6, 2005 | Kitt Peak | Spacewatch | · | 570 m | MPC · JPL |
| 561567 | 2015 TY_{254} | — | October 23, 2011 | Haleakala | Pan-STARRS 1 | (194) | 1.4 km | MPC · JPL |
| 561568 | 2015 TK_{255} | — | April 8, 2002 | Kitt Peak | Spacewatch | · | 1.2 km | MPC · JPL |
| 561569 | 2015 TL_{255} | — | October 10, 2015 | Haleakala | Pan-STARRS 1 | PHO | 840 m | MPC · JPL |
| 561570 | 2015 TC_{257} | — | August 30, 2005 | Kitt Peak | Spacewatch | · | 510 m | MPC · JPL |
| 561571 | 2015 TM_{257} | — | November 6, 2005 | Kitt Peak | Spacewatch | · | 580 m | MPC · JPL |
| 561572 | 2015 TC_{260} | — | October 11, 2015 | XuYi | PMO NEO Survey Program | EUN | 910 m | MPC · JPL |
| 561573 | 2015 TH_{260} | — | March 12, 2010 | Kitt Peak | Spacewatch | PHO | 1.1 km | MPC · JPL |
| 561574 | 2015 TV_{261} | — | March 24, 2014 | Haleakala | Pan-STARRS 1 | V | 580 m | MPC · JPL |
| 561575 | 2015 TH_{263} | — | January 28, 2006 | Mount Lemmon | Mount Lemmon Survey | · | 1.3 km | MPC · JPL |
| 561576 | 2015 TE_{266} | — | September 23, 2008 | Kitt Peak | Spacewatch | · | 1.0 km | MPC · JPL |
| 561577 | 2015 TF_{268} | — | June 8, 2005 | Kitt Peak | Spacewatch | · | 2.0 km | MPC · JPL |
| 561578 | 2015 TY_{269} | — | April 5, 2014 | Haleakala | Pan-STARRS 1 | · | 1.2 km | MPC · JPL |
| 561579 | 2015 TO_{276} | — | February 13, 2002 | Kitt Peak | Spacewatch | · | 980 m | MPC · JPL |
| 561580 | 2015 TG_{277} | — | August 24, 2011 | Haleakala | Pan-STARRS 1 | · | 1.0 km | MPC · JPL |
| 561581 | 2015 TW_{280} | — | August 27, 2002 | Palomar | NEAT | · | 540 m | MPC · JPL |
| 561582 | 2015 TK_{281} | — | October 8, 2008 | Mount Lemmon | Mount Lemmon Survey | · | 910 m | MPC · JPL |
| 561583 | 2015 TU_{285} | — | February 26, 2014 | Haleakala | Pan-STARRS 1 | · | 740 m | MPC · JPL |
| 561584 | 2015 TB_{286} | — | July 25, 2015 | Haleakala | Pan-STARRS 1 | · | 1.9 km | MPC · JPL |
| 561585 | 2015 TC_{288} | — | January 10, 2013 | Haleakala | Pan-STARRS 1 | · | 930 m | MPC · JPL |
| 561586 | 2015 TE_{290} | — | September 6, 2015 | Haleakala | Pan-STARRS 1 | · | 600 m | MPC · JPL |
| 561587 | 2015 TA_{291} | — | March 12, 2008 | Kitt Peak | Spacewatch | · | 900 m | MPC · JPL |
| 561588 | 2015 TX_{291} | — | July 25, 2015 | Haleakala | Pan-STARRS 1 | · | 1.2 km | MPC · JPL |
| 561589 | 2015 TP_{292} | — | December 22, 2012 | Haleakala | Pan-STARRS 1 | · | 970 m | MPC · JPL |
| 561590 | 2015 TR_{298} | — | December 16, 2003 | Kitt Peak | Spacewatch | BRG | 1.4 km | MPC · JPL |
| 561591 | 2015 TB_{299} | — | August 23, 2003 | Palomar | NEAT | · | 1.6 km | MPC · JPL |
| 561592 | 2015 TR_{300} | — | October 25, 2008 | Mount Lemmon | Mount Lemmon Survey | · | 880 m | MPC · JPL |
| 561593 | 2015 TV_{301} | — | January 12, 2008 | Catalina | CSS | · | 1.9 km | MPC · JPL |
| 561594 | 2015 TE_{302} | — | August 21, 2015 | Haleakala | Pan-STARRS 1 | · | 1 km | MPC · JPL |
| 561595 | 2015 TM_{303} | — | September 9, 2015 | Haleakala | Pan-STARRS 1 | · | 1.1 km | MPC · JPL |
| 561596 | 2015 TL_{305} | — | October 26, 2011 | Haleakala | Pan-STARRS 1 | · | 850 m | MPC · JPL |
| 561597 | 2015 TM_{306} | — | October 26, 2011 | Haleakala | Pan-STARRS 1 | · | 1 km | MPC · JPL |
| 561598 | 2015 TF_{308} | — | October 12, 2015 | Haleakala | Pan-STARRS 1 | MAR | 1.0 km | MPC · JPL |
| 561599 | 2015 TO_{310} | — | October 12, 2015 | Haleakala | Pan-STARRS 1 | · | 1.3 km | MPC · JPL |
| 561600 | 2015 TP_{310} | — | January 15, 2008 | Mount Lemmon | Mount Lemmon Survey | · | 1.1 km | MPC · JPL |

== 561601–561700 ==
back to top

| Designation | | | Discovery | | | Properties | | Ref |
| Permanent | Provisional | Named after | Date | Site | Discoverer(s) | Category | Diam. | Ref |
|---|---|---|---|---|---|---|---|---|
| 561601 | 2015 TN_{312} | — | August 12, 2015 | Haleakala | Pan-STARRS 1 | · | 1.4 km | MPC · JPL |
| 561602 | 2015 TN_{318} | — | August 17, 2006 | Palomar | NEAT | · | 1.7 km | MPC · JPL |
| 561603 | 2015 TR_{318} | — | January 11, 2008 | Catalina | CSS | · | 980 m | MPC · JPL |
| 561604 | 2015 TR_{319} | — | February 15, 2013 | Haleakala | Pan-STARRS 1 | · | 1.1 km | MPC · JPL |
| 561605 | 2015 TN_{320} | — | March 10, 2003 | Kitt Peak | Spacewatch | NYS | 860 m | MPC · JPL |
| 561606 | 2015 TQ_{321} | — | September 5, 2010 | Mount Lemmon | Mount Lemmon Survey | · | 1.9 km | MPC · JPL |
| 561607 | 2015 TU_{323} | — | November 4, 2004 | Catalina | CSS | · | 1.2 km | MPC · JPL |
| 561608 | 2015 TO_{324} | — | August 21, 2015 | Haleakala | Pan-STARRS 1 | · | 1 km | MPC · JPL |
| 561609 | 2015 TD_{326} | — | July 1, 2008 | Kitt Peak | Spacewatch | · | 730 m | MPC · JPL |
| 561610 | 2015 TF_{327} | — | October 13, 2015 | Haleakala | Pan-STARRS 1 | · | 2.7 km | MPC · JPL |
| 561611 | 2015 TP_{329} | — | October 13, 2015 | Haleakala | Pan-STARRS 1 | · | 1.2 km | MPC · JPL |
| 561612 | 2015 TB_{330} | — | April 18, 2013 | Mount Lemmon | Mount Lemmon Survey | · | 1.3 km | MPC · JPL |
| 561613 | 2015 TZ_{330} | — | April 6, 2008 | Mount Lemmon | Mount Lemmon Survey | · | 3.1 km | MPC · JPL |
| 561614 | 2015 TQ_{331} | — | April 20, 2013 | Mount Lemmon | Mount Lemmon Survey | EUN | 1.1 km | MPC · JPL |
| 561615 | 2015 TE_{333} | — | October 19, 2006 | Kitt Peak | Deep Ecliptic Survey | BRG | 1.1 km | MPC · JPL |
| 561616 | 2015 TR_{334} | — | July 28, 2014 | Haleakala | Pan-STARRS 1 | · | 1.2 km | MPC · JPL |
| 561617 | 2015 TZ_{336} | — | January 2, 2009 | Mount Lemmon | Mount Lemmon Survey | MAS | 630 m | MPC · JPL |
| 561618 | 2015 TD_{337} | — | November 13, 2007 | Mount Lemmon | Mount Lemmon Survey | (5) | 1.1 km | MPC · JPL |
| 561619 | 2015 TC_{339} | — | September 14, 2005 | Catalina | CSS | · | 700 m | MPC · JPL |
| 561620 | 2015 TC_{341} | — | December 31, 2007 | Kitt Peak | Spacewatch | JUN | 690 m | MPC · JPL |
| 561621 | 2015 TC_{344} | — | February 10, 2013 | Haleakala | Pan-STARRS 1 | · | 920 m | MPC · JPL |
| 561622 | 2015 TL_{346} | — | May 8, 2014 | Haleakala | Pan-STARRS 1 | V | 530 m | MPC · JPL |
| 561623 | 2015 TS_{346} | — | October 11, 2002 | Palomar | NEAT | · | 1.7 km | MPC · JPL |
| 561624 | 2015 TK_{347} | — | August 21, 2015 | Haleakala | Pan-STARRS 1 | · | 610 m | MPC · JPL |
| 561625 | 2015 TQ_{348} | — | September 14, 2007 | Mount Lemmon | Mount Lemmon Survey | · | 890 m | MPC · JPL |
| 561626 | 2015 TT_{357} | — | December 29, 2008 | Mount Lemmon | Mount Lemmon Survey | V | 550 m | MPC · JPL |
| 561627 | 2015 TM_{359} | — | March 17, 2013 | Palomar | Palomar Transient Factory | EUN | 840 m | MPC · JPL |
| 561628 | 2015 TS_{359} | — | October 9, 2015 | Haleakala | Pan-STARRS 1 | JUN | 760 m | MPC · JPL |
| 561629 | 2015 TO_{364} | — | November 3, 2007 | Mount Lemmon | Mount Lemmon Survey | · | 930 m | MPC · JPL |
| 561630 | 2015 TV_{364} | — | January 1, 2009 | Kitt Peak | Spacewatch | · | 1.0 km | MPC · JPL |
| 561631 | 2015 TF_{365} | — | May 11, 2010 | Mount Lemmon | Mount Lemmon Survey | · | 1.3 km | MPC · JPL |
| 561632 | 2015 TM_{367} | — | August 24, 2011 | Haleakala | Pan-STARRS 1 | V | 430 m | MPC · JPL |
| 561633 | 2015 TR_{367} | — | March 19, 2009 | Mount Lemmon | Mount Lemmon Survey | NYS | 1.2 km | MPC · JPL |
| 561634 | 2015 TB_{368} | — | January 16, 2009 | Mount Lemmon | Mount Lemmon Survey | · | 1.1 km | MPC · JPL |
| 561635 | 2015 TR_{368} | — | August 28, 2011 | Haleakala | Pan-STARRS 1 | · | 1.3 km | MPC · JPL |
| 561636 | 2015 TS_{368} | — | April 30, 2014 | Haleakala | Pan-STARRS 1 | · | 730 m | MPC · JPL |
| 561637 | 2015 TY_{368} | — | October 10, 2015 | Haleakala | Pan-STARRS 1 | · | 990 m | MPC · JPL |
| 561638 | 2015 TZ_{370} | — | October 3, 2015 | Mount Lemmon | Mount Lemmon Survey | · | 1.1 km | MPC · JPL |
| 561639 | 2015 TA_{372} | — | September 29, 2011 | Mount Lemmon | Mount Lemmon Survey | · | 1.0 km | MPC · JPL |
| 561640 | 2015 TL_{374} | — | February 8, 2008 | Kitt Peak | Spacewatch | · | 970 m | MPC · JPL |
| 561641 | 2015 TY_{376} | — | October 8, 2015 | Haleakala | Pan-STARRS 1 | · | 1.0 km | MPC · JPL |
| 561642 | 2015 TJ_{377} | — | January 15, 2008 | Mount Lemmon | Mount Lemmon Survey | MAR | 800 m | MPC · JPL |
| 561643 | 2015 TF_{379} | — | September 23, 2011 | Haleakala | Pan-STARRS 1 | · | 1.0 km | MPC · JPL |
| 561644 | 2015 TA_{380} | — | October 10, 2015 | Haleakala | Pan-STARRS 1 | MAR | 990 m | MPC · JPL |
| 561645 | 2015 TL_{380} | — | November 18, 2011 | Mount Lemmon | Mount Lemmon Survey | · | 1.4 km | MPC · JPL |
| 561646 | 2015 TW_{380} | — | May 4, 2014 | Haleakala | Pan-STARRS 1 | · | 890 m | MPC · JPL |
| 561647 | 2015 TG_{381} | — | May 7, 2014 | Haleakala | Pan-STARRS 1 | · | 1.0 km | MPC · JPL |
| 561648 | 2015 TK_{381} | — | October 10, 2015 | Haleakala | Pan-STARRS 1 | · | 1.2 km | MPC · JPL |
| 561649 | 2015 TC_{383} | — | October 10, 2015 | Haleakala | Pan-STARRS 1 | · | 1.2 km | MPC · JPL |
| 561650 | 2015 TR_{383} | — | May 21, 2014 | Haleakala | Pan-STARRS 1 | V | 620 m | MPC · JPL |
| 561651 | 2015 TX_{385} | — | December 17, 2007 | Mount Lemmon | Mount Lemmon Survey | EUN | 990 m | MPC · JPL |
| 561652 | 2015 TA_{386} | — | March 23, 2003 | Apache Point | SDSS Collaboration | · | 2.0 km | MPC · JPL |
| 561653 | 2015 TJ_{386} | — | December 15, 2004 | Kitt Peak | Spacewatch | · | 1.1 km | MPC · JPL |
| 561654 | 2015 TO_{386} | — | January 26, 2006 | Mount Lemmon | Mount Lemmon Survey | MAS | 660 m | MPC · JPL |
| 561655 | 2015 TS_{386} | — | April 5, 2014 | Haleakala | Pan-STARRS 1 | · | 790 m | MPC · JPL |
| 561656 | 2015 TW_{386} | — | March 24, 2006 | Mount Lemmon | Mount Lemmon Survey | NYS | 920 m | MPC · JPL |
| 561657 | 2015 TX_{386} | — | October 10, 2015 | Haleakala | Pan-STARRS 1 | · | 1.4 km | MPC · JPL |
| 561658 | 2015 TB_{387} | — | October 15, 2015 | Mount Lemmon | Mount Lemmon Survey | EUN | 1.2 km | MPC · JPL |
| 561659 | 2015 TC_{387} | — | November 23, 2011 | Mount Lemmon | Mount Lemmon Survey | · | 820 m | MPC · JPL |
| 561660 | 2015 TE_{387} | — | October 10, 2015 | Haleakala | Pan-STARRS 1 | (5) | 860 m | MPC · JPL |
| 561661 | 2015 TZ_{387} | — | October 8, 2015 | Haleakala | Pan-STARRS 1 | · | 1.1 km | MPC · JPL |
| 561662 | 2015 TK_{400} | — | October 8, 2015 | Haleakala | Pan-STARRS 1 | HNS | 840 m | MPC · JPL |
| 561663 | 2015 TV_{408} | — | October 10, 2015 | Haleakala | Pan-STARRS 1 | · | 950 m | MPC · JPL |
| 561664 | 2015 TB_{409} | — | September 24, 2011 | Haleakala | Pan-STARRS 1 | (5) | 780 m | MPC · JPL |
| 561665 | 2015 TO_{422} | — | November 10, 2010 | Mount Lemmon | Mount Lemmon Survey | EOS | 1.6 km | MPC · JPL |
| 561666 | 2015 TT_{431} | — | October 10, 2015 | Haleakala | Pan-STARRS 1 | · | 1.4 km | MPC · JPL |
| 561667 | 2015 TD_{434} | — | October 13, 2015 | Kitt Peak | Spacewatch | 615 | 1.1 km | MPC · JPL |
| 561668 | 2015 TH_{434} | — | October 10, 2015 | Haleakala | Pan-STARRS 1 | KOR | 1.0 km | MPC · JPL |
| 561669 | 2015 UX_{2} | — | January 16, 2009 | Mount Lemmon | Mount Lemmon Survey | NYS | 1.3 km | MPC · JPL |
| 561670 | 2015 UV_{3} | — | September 11, 2015 | Haleakala | Pan-STARRS 1 | · | 2.0 km | MPC · JPL |
| 561671 | 2015 UX_{5} | — | August 25, 2011 | Bergisch Gladbach | W. Bickel | · | 1 km | MPC · JPL |
| 561672 | 2015 UR_{6} | — | October 7, 2008 | Mount Lemmon | Mount Lemmon Survey | · | 740 m | MPC · JPL |
| 561673 | 2015 UE_{7} | — | October 27, 2005 | Catalina | CSS | · | 780 m | MPC · JPL |
| 561674 | 2015 UM_{7} | — | December 14, 2003 | Palomar | NEAT | EUN | 1.5 km | MPC · JPL |
| 561675 | 2015 UN_{7} | — | December 27, 2011 | Catalina | CSS | · | 1.3 km | MPC · JPL |
| 561676 | 2015 UA_{10} | — | October 13, 2004 | Kitt Peak | Spacewatch | MAS | 630 m | MPC · JPL |
| 561677 | 2015 UH_{10} | — | January 7, 2013 | Mount Lemmon | Mount Lemmon Survey | V | 450 m | MPC · JPL |
| 561678 | 2015 UC_{11} | — | September 20, 2011 | Haleakala | Pan-STARRS 1 | · | 980 m | MPC · JPL |
| 561679 | 2015 UN_{11} | — | March 13, 2002 | Kitt Peak | Spacewatch | V | 560 m | MPC · JPL |
| 561680 | 2015 US_{16} | — | September 23, 2008 | Mount Lemmon | Mount Lemmon Survey | V | 480 m | MPC · JPL |
| 561681 | 2015 UE_{18} | — | April 8, 2002 | Kitt Peak | Spacewatch | · | 1.1 km | MPC · JPL |
| 561682 | 2015 UE_{21} | — | January 20, 2009 | Catalina | CSS | · | 930 m | MPC · JPL |
| 561683 | 2015 US_{21} | — | March 9, 2002 | Kitt Peak | Spacewatch | · | 1.2 km | MPC · JPL |
| 561684 | 2015 UJ_{22} | — | April 10, 2013 | Haleakala | Pan-STARRS 1 | · | 1.4 km | MPC · JPL |
| 561685 | 2015 UB_{23} | — | May 3, 2014 | Mount Lemmon | Mount Lemmon Survey | · | 940 m | MPC · JPL |
| 561686 | 2015 US_{24} | — | January 19, 2013 | Mount Lemmon | Mount Lemmon Survey | · | 1.1 km | MPC · JPL |
| 561687 | 2015 UF_{28} | — | April 27, 2012 | Haleakala | Pan-STARRS 1 | · | 2.7 km | MPC · JPL |
| 561688 | 2015 UF_{30} | — | October 31, 2008 | Kitt Peak | Spacewatch | V | 450 m | MPC · JPL |
| 561689 | 2015 UG_{30} | — | April 23, 2011 | Haleakala | Pan-STARRS 1 | · | 520 m | MPC · JPL |
| 561690 | 2015 UU_{32} | — | February 20, 2002 | Kitt Peak | Spacewatch | MAS | 590 m | MPC · JPL |
| 561691 | 2015 UJ_{34} | — | December 14, 2004 | Kitt Peak | Spacewatch | · | 1.0 km | MPC · JPL |
| 561692 | 2015 UV_{36} | — | October 12, 2015 | Haleakala | Pan-STARRS 1 | V | 530 m | MPC · JPL |
| 561693 | 2015 UL_{41} | — | October 9, 2015 | Mount Lemmon | Mount Lemmon Survey | · | 880 m | MPC · JPL |
| 561694 | 2015 UW_{41} | — | February 7, 2013 | Catalina | CSS | · | 1.3 km | MPC · JPL |
| 561695 | 2015 UF_{44} | — | October 23, 2011 | Haleakala | Pan-STARRS 1 | · | 780 m | MPC · JPL |
| 561696 | 2015 UG_{45} | — | March 25, 2014 | Mount Lemmon | Mount Lemmon Survey | V | 640 m | MPC · JPL |
| 561697 | 2015 UQ_{45} | — | January 11, 2008 | Mount Lemmon | Mount Lemmon Survey | (5) | 710 m | MPC · JPL |
| 561698 | 2015 UC_{46} | — | August 20, 2011 | Haleakala | Pan-STARRS 1 | · | 940 m | MPC · JPL |
| 561699 | 2015 US_{47} | — | August 27, 2001 | Palomar | NEAT | (2076) | 900 m | MPC · JPL |
| 561700 | 2015 UZ_{47} | — | July 28, 2011 | Haleakala | Pan-STARRS 1 | · | 840 m | MPC · JPL |

== 561701–561800 ==
back to top

| Designation | | | Discovery | | | Properties | | Ref |
| Permanent | Provisional | Named after | Date | Site | Discoverer(s) | Category | Diam. | Ref |
|---|---|---|---|---|---|---|---|---|
| 561701 | 2015 UU_{49} | — | July 27, 2014 | Haleakala | Pan-STARRS 1 | · | 1.2 km | MPC · JPL |
| 561702 | 2015 UW_{57} | — | November 20, 2000 | Socorro | LINEAR | · | 1.3 km | MPC · JPL |
| 561703 | 2015 UH_{58} | — | June 23, 2011 | Mount Lemmon | Mount Lemmon Survey | · | 680 m | MPC · JPL |
| 561704 | 2015 UM_{59} | — | April 17, 2013 | Haleakala | Pan-STARRS 1 | · | 1.3 km | MPC · JPL |
| 561705 | 2015 UO_{59} | — | October 9, 2015 | Haleakala | Pan-STARRS 1 | · | 610 m | MPC · JPL |
| 561706 | 2015 UB_{62} | — | December 2, 2008 | Mount Lemmon | Mount Lemmon Survey | · | 1.5 km | MPC · JPL |
| 561707 | 2015 UG_{65} | — | October 21, 2015 | Haleakala | Pan-STARRS 1 | · | 980 m | MPC · JPL |
| 561708 | 2015 UP_{65} | — | October 21, 2015 | Palomar | Palomar Transient Factory | JUN | 780 m | MPC · JPL |
| 561709 | 2015 UR_{65} | — | September 18, 2006 | Catalina | CSS | · | 2.3 km | MPC · JPL |
| 561710 | 2015 UU_{65} | — | November 25, 2011 | Haleakala | Pan-STARRS 1 | · | 1.5 km | MPC · JPL |
| 561711 | 2015 UW_{65} | — | August 29, 2006 | Kitt Peak | Spacewatch | · | 1.2 km | MPC · JPL |
| 561712 | 2015 UY_{65} | — | November 17, 2011 | Mount Lemmon | Mount Lemmon Survey | · | 1.1 km | MPC · JPL |
| 561713 | 2015 UK_{66} | — | November 11, 2007 | Mount Lemmon | Mount Lemmon Survey | · | 1.1 km | MPC · JPL |
| 561714 | 2015 UX_{67} | — | December 22, 2003 | Kitt Peak | Spacewatch | · | 1.4 km | MPC · JPL |
| 561715 | 2015 UT_{69} | — | November 20, 2008 | Kitt Peak | Spacewatch | · | 930 m | MPC · JPL |
| 561716 | 2015 UA_{72} | — | March 28, 2014 | Mount Lemmon | Mount Lemmon Survey | · | 1.2 km | MPC · JPL |
| 561717 | 2015 UD_{72} | — | October 17, 1998 | Kitt Peak | Spacewatch | V | 580 m | MPC · JPL |
| 561718 | 2015 UH_{74} | — | May 4, 2014 | Haleakala | Pan-STARRS 1 | · | 1.5 km | MPC · JPL |
| 561719 | 2015 UK_{74} | — | January 20, 2009 | Kitt Peak | Spacewatch | · | 870 m | MPC · JPL |
| 561720 | 2015 UC_{75} | — | October 24, 2015 | Haleakala | Pan-STARRS 1 | · | 1 km | MPC · JPL |
| 561721 | 2015 UR_{75} | — | October 22, 2011 | Mount Lemmon | Mount Lemmon Survey | JUN | 830 m | MPC · JPL |
| 561722 | 2015 UB_{77} | — | November 11, 2007 | Mount Lemmon | Mount Lemmon Survey | · | 2.1 km | MPC · JPL |
| 561723 | 2015 UJ_{77} | — | May 27, 2014 | Mount Lemmon | Mount Lemmon Survey | V | 790 m | MPC · JPL |
| 561724 | 2015 UM_{77} | — | September 9, 2015 | Haleakala | Pan-STARRS 1 | · | 1.3 km | MPC · JPL |
| 561725 | 2015 UO_{77} | — | October 26, 2001 | Palomar | NEAT | · | 910 m | MPC · JPL |
| 561726 | 2015 US_{77} | — | August 14, 2002 | Palomar | NEAT | · | 1.5 km | MPC · JPL |
| 561727 | 2015 UU_{77} | — | October 24, 2015 | Haleakala | Pan-STARRS 1 | KON | 2.7 km | MPC · JPL |
| 561728 | 2015 UX_{77} | — | November 18, 2007 | Mount Lemmon | Mount Lemmon Survey | (5) | 1.0 km | MPC · JPL |
| 561729 | 2015 UD_{78} | — | December 4, 2007 | Kitt Peak | Spacewatch | (5) | 1.1 km | MPC · JPL |
| 561730 | 2015 UT_{78} | — | December 5, 2005 | Kitt Peak | Spacewatch | · | 680 m | MPC · JPL |
| 561731 | 2015 UF_{79} | — | August 21, 2015 | Haleakala | Pan-STARRS 1 | · | 1.2 km | MPC · JPL |
| 561732 | 2015 UO_{79} | — | August 12, 2015 | Haleakala | Pan-STARRS 1 | JUN | 800 m | MPC · JPL |
| 561733 | 2015 UL_{81} | — | August 29, 2006 | Catalina | CSS | HNS | 1.3 km | MPC · JPL |
| 561734 | 2015 UQ_{82} | — | October 11, 2007 | Catalina | CSS | · | 1.1 km | MPC · JPL |
| 561735 | 2015 UH_{86} | — | September 13, 2007 | Mount Lemmon | Mount Lemmon Survey | · | 840 m | MPC · JPL |
| 561736 | 2015 UR_{86} | — | December 13, 2006 | Catalina | CSS | HNS | 1.3 km | MPC · JPL |
| 561737 | 2015 UV_{86} | — | September 4, 2002 | Palomar | NEAT | · | 1.1 km | MPC · JPL |
| 561738 | 2015 UW_{86} | — | October 21, 2015 | Haleakala | Pan-STARRS 1 | EUN | 970 m | MPC · JPL |
| 561739 | 2015 UC_{87} | — | December 16, 2007 | Mount Lemmon | Mount Lemmon Survey | · | 1.2 km | MPC · JPL |
| 561740 | 2015 UE_{87} | — | August 26, 2014 | Haleakala | Pan-STARRS 1 | · | 1.3 km | MPC · JPL |
| 561741 | 2015 UJ_{87} | — | February 15, 2013 | Haleakala | Pan-STARRS 1 | · | 1.1 km | MPC · JPL |
| 561742 | 2015 UW_{87} | — | August 27, 2011 | Haleakala | Pan-STARRS 1 | · | 1.4 km | MPC · JPL |
| 561743 | 2015 UX_{87} | — | November 7, 2007 | Kitt Peak | Spacewatch | BRG | 1.1 km | MPC · JPL |
| 561744 | 2015 UV_{90} | — | September 28, 2006 | Mount Lemmon | Mount Lemmon Survey | · | 1.8 km | MPC · JPL |
| 561745 | 2015 UJ_{98} | — | October 24, 2015 | Haleakala | Pan-STARRS 1 | · | 2.1 km | MPC · JPL |
| 561746 | 2015 VH_{3} | — | November 20, 2008 | Mount Lemmon | Mount Lemmon Survey | · | 1.9 km | MPC · JPL |
| 561747 | 2015 VC_{4} | — | April 23, 2014 | Cerro Tololo-DECam | DECam | · | 540 m | MPC · JPL |
| 561748 | 2015 VX_{5} | — | October 25, 2011 | Haleakala | Pan-STARRS 1 | · | 980 m | MPC · JPL |
| 561749 | 2015 VD_{11} | — | November 1, 2015 | Haleakala | Pan-STARRS 1 | · | 1.3 km | MPC · JPL |
| 561750 | 2015 VA_{13} | — | September 6, 2008 | Mount Lemmon | Mount Lemmon Survey | · | 540 m | MPC · JPL |
| 561751 | 2015 VW_{13} | — | November 24, 2008 | Kitt Peak | Spacewatch | · | 1.0 km | MPC · JPL |
| 561752 | 2015 VA_{14} | — | October 8, 2004 | Kitt Peak | Spacewatch | · | 1.1 km | MPC · JPL |
| 561753 | 2015 VM_{16} | — | November 2, 2000 | Kitt Peak | Spacewatch | · | 1.2 km | MPC · JPL |
| 561754 | 2015 VB_{18} | — | October 18, 2011 | Mount Lemmon | Mount Lemmon Survey | · | 890 m | MPC · JPL |
| 561755 | 2015 VW_{18} | — | October 20, 2011 | Mount Lemmon | Mount Lemmon Survey | · | 840 m | MPC · JPL |
| 561756 | 2015 VW_{22} | — | September 27, 2006 | Mount Lemmon | Mount Lemmon Survey | · | 1.4 km | MPC · JPL |
| 561757 | 2015 VZ_{22} | — | October 18, 2007 | Mount Lemmon | Mount Lemmon Survey | MAR | 720 m | MPC · JPL |
| 561758 | 2015 VJ_{23} | — | October 17, 2010 | Mount Lemmon | Mount Lemmon Survey | · | 1.7 km | MPC · JPL |
| 561759 | 2015 VZ_{25} | — | November 1, 2015 | Kitt Peak | Spacewatch | · | 1.2 km | MPC · JPL |
| 561760 | 2015 VF_{26} | — | March 8, 2008 | Kitt Peak | Spacewatch | · | 1.3 km | MPC · JPL |
| 561761 | 2015 VJ_{28} | — | September 29, 2011 | Mount Lemmon | Mount Lemmon Survey | · | 1.2 km | MPC · JPL |
| 561762 | 2015 VR_{29} | — | September 18, 2003 | Kitt Peak | Spacewatch | · | 1.3 km | MPC · JPL |
| 561763 | 2015 VT_{29} | — | September 19, 2011 | Haleakala | Pan-STARRS 1 | V | 600 m | MPC · JPL |
| 561764 | 2015 VR_{31} | — | October 10, 2015 | Haleakala | Pan-STARRS 1 | PHO | 890 m | MPC · JPL |
| 561765 | 2015 VL_{34} | — | September 22, 2011 | Kitt Peak | Spacewatch | · | 1.3 km | MPC · JPL |
| 561766 | 2015 VJ_{35} | — | September 19, 2011 | Haleakala | Pan-STARRS 1 | · | 930 m | MPC · JPL |
| 561767 | 2015 VB_{36} | — | January 20, 2008 | Mount Lemmon | Mount Lemmon Survey | · | 1.5 km | MPC · JPL |
| 561768 | 2015 VP_{36} | — | October 20, 2011 | Mount Lemmon | Mount Lemmon Survey | · | 870 m | MPC · JPL |
| 561769 | 2015 VT_{37} | — | December 30, 2007 | Kitt Peak | Spacewatch | · | 910 m | MPC · JPL |
| 561770 | 2015 VU_{37} | — | December 13, 1998 | Kitt Peak | Spacewatch | · | 1.1 km | MPC · JPL |
| 561771 | 2015 VF_{40} | — | January 6, 2006 | Mount Lemmon | Mount Lemmon Survey | · | 1.0 km | MPC · JPL |
| 561772 | 2015 VM_{40} | — | October 26, 2011 | Haleakala | Pan-STARRS 1 | · | 1.0 km | MPC · JPL |
| 561773 | 2015 VZ_{40} | — | April 26, 2001 | Palomar | NEAT | · | 1.5 km | MPC · JPL |
| 561774 | 2015 VL_{42} | — | March 3, 2009 | Kitt Peak | Spacewatch | · | 1.3 km | MPC · JPL |
| 561775 | 2015 VH_{46} | — | November 8, 2009 | Mount Lemmon | Mount Lemmon Survey | · | 720 m | MPC · JPL |
| 561776 | 2015 VR_{50} | — | January 16, 2013 | Mount Lemmon | Mount Lemmon Survey | V | 560 m | MPC · JPL |
| 561777 | 2015 VB_{53} | — | November 11, 2004 | Kitt Peak | Spacewatch | NYS | 950 m | MPC · JPL |
| 561778 | 2015 VO_{53} | — | July 28, 2011 | Siding Spring | SSS | · | 930 m | MPC · JPL |
| 561779 | 2015 VN_{54} | — | November 17, 2008 | Kitt Peak | Spacewatch | V | 760 m | MPC · JPL |
| 561780 | 2015 VN_{57} | — | February 2, 2009 | Mount Lemmon | Mount Lemmon Survey | · | 940 m | MPC · JPL |
| 561781 | 2015 VG_{59} | — | May 1, 2014 | ESA OGS | ESA OGS | V | 560 m | MPC · JPL |
| 561782 | 2015 VM_{59} | — | February 3, 2013 | Haleakala | Pan-STARRS 1 | · | 1.3 km | MPC · JPL |
| 561783 | 2015 VO_{60} | — | March 15, 2013 | Kitt Peak | Spacewatch | · | 1.4 km | MPC · JPL |
| 561784 | 2015 VK_{62} | — | January 2, 2012 | Mount Lemmon | Mount Lemmon Survey | · | 1.1 km | MPC · JPL |
| 561785 | 2015 VL_{63} | — | October 9, 2015 | Haleakala | Pan-STARRS 1 | · | 1.1 km | MPC · JPL |
| 561786 | 2015 VS_{66} | — | October 1, 2008 | Mount Lemmon | Mount Lemmon Survey | · | 530 m | MPC · JPL |
| 561787 | 2015 VZ_{66} | — | September 8, 2004 | Socorro | LINEAR | · | 990 m | MPC · JPL |
| 561788 | 2015 VM_{68} | — | February 10, 2010 | Kitt Peak | Spacewatch | · | 770 m | MPC · JPL |
| 561789 | 2015 VO_{68} | — | April 24, 2011 | Kitt Peak | Spacewatch | · | 800 m | MPC · JPL |
| 561790 | 2015 VQ_{68} | — | September 23, 2011 | Haleakala | Pan-STARRS 1 | · | 960 m | MPC · JPL |
| 561791 | 2015 VS_{68} | — | November 7, 2008 | Mount Lemmon | Mount Lemmon Survey | · | 1.1 km | MPC · JPL |
| 561792 | 2015 VM_{71} | — | April 2, 2009 | Mount Lemmon | Mount Lemmon Survey | · | 970 m | MPC · JPL |
| 561793 | 2015 VB_{72} | — | March 11, 2005 | Mount Lemmon | Mount Lemmon Survey | · | 1.2 km | MPC · JPL |
| 561794 | 2015 VU_{72} | — | May 5, 2013 | Haleakala | Pan-STARRS 1 | · | 1.2 km | MPC · JPL |
| 561795 | 2015 VS_{74} | — | January 1, 2008 | Catalina | CSS | · | 1.3 km | MPC · JPL |
| 561796 | 2015 VR_{77} | — | January 1, 2008 | Kitt Peak | Spacewatch | HNS | 870 m | MPC · JPL |
| 561797 | 2015 VY_{77} | — | April 13, 2013 | Haleakala | Pan-STARRS 1 | ADE | 1.4 km | MPC · JPL |
| 561798 | 2015 VH_{82} | — | October 28, 2011 | Mount Lemmon | Mount Lemmon Survey | · | 740 m | MPC · JPL |
| 561799 | 2015 VV_{83} | — | May 21, 2014 | Haleakala | Pan-STARRS 1 | PHO | 810 m | MPC · JPL |
| 561800 | 2015 VT_{84} | — | October 7, 2008 | Mount Lemmon | Mount Lemmon Survey | V | 440 m | MPC · JPL |

== 561801–561900 ==
back to top

| Designation | | | Discovery | | | Properties | | Ref |
| Permanent | Provisional | Named after | Date | Site | Discoverer(s) | Category | Diam. | Ref |
|---|---|---|---|---|---|---|---|---|
| 561801 | 2015 VQ_{85} | — | June 27, 2011 | Mount Lemmon | Mount Lemmon Survey | · | 750 m | MPC · JPL |
| 561802 | 2015 VC_{86} | — | November 22, 2008 | Kitt Peak | Spacewatch | · | 1.1 km | MPC · JPL |
| 561803 | 2015 VT_{86} | — | October 25, 2011 | Haleakala | Pan-STARRS 1 | · | 1.2 km | MPC · JPL |
| 561804 | 2015 VA_{87} | — | October 26, 2011 | Haleakala | Pan-STARRS 1 | · | 580 m | MPC · JPL |
| 561805 | 2015 VD_{87} | — | August 21, 2008 | Kitt Peak | Spacewatch | · | 570 m | MPC · JPL |
| 561806 | 2015 VH_{87} | — | May 10, 2014 | Haleakala | Pan-STARRS 1 | · | 1.9 km | MPC · JPL |
| 561807 | 2015 VO_{87} | — | December 18, 2007 | Mount Lemmon | Mount Lemmon Survey | (5) | 810 m | MPC · JPL |
| 561808 | 2015 VX_{87} | — | September 29, 2008 | Mount Lemmon | Mount Lemmon Survey | · | 1.1 km | MPC · JPL |
| 561809 | 2015 VK_{88} | — | March 11, 2008 | Catalina | CSS | · | 1.2 km | MPC · JPL |
| 561810 | 2015 VE_{90} | — | August 29, 2005 | Palomar | NEAT | · | 880 m | MPC · JPL |
| 561811 | 2015 VM_{92} | — | January 19, 2013 | Kitt Peak | Spacewatch | · | 940 m | MPC · JPL |
| 561812 | 2015 VL_{94} | — | December 30, 2008 | Kitt Peak | Spacewatch | NYS | 1.1 km | MPC · JPL |
| 561813 | 2015 VR_{95} | — | October 12, 2006 | Palomar | NEAT | · | 1.6 km | MPC · JPL |
| 561814 | 2015 VC_{96} | — | July 25, 2015 | Haleakala | Pan-STARRS 1 | ADE | 1.6 km | MPC · JPL |
| 561815 | 2015 VL_{97} | — | April 19, 2007 | Kitt Peak | Spacewatch | V | 520 m | MPC · JPL |
| 561816 | 2015 VT_{97} | — | March 13, 2010 | Mount Lemmon | Mount Lemmon Survey | MAS | 590 m | MPC · JPL |
| 561817 | 2015 VP_{98} | — | November 14, 2001 | Kitt Peak | Spacewatch | · | 610 m | MPC · JPL |
| 561818 | 2015 VV_{98} | — | November 10, 2004 | Kitt Peak | Spacewatch | · | 1.1 km | MPC · JPL |
| 561819 | 2015 VG_{100} | — | February 6, 2013 | Nogales | M. Schwartz, P. R. Holvorcem | · | 1.5 km | MPC · JPL |
| 561820 | 2015 VJ_{100} | — | October 30, 2011 | Ka-Dar | Gerke, V. | · | 1.2 km | MPC · JPL |
| 561821 | 2015 VZ_{101} | — | November 18, 2008 | Kitt Peak | Spacewatch | · | 1.0 km | MPC · JPL |
| 561822 | 2015 VX_{102} | — | February 20, 2009 | Kitt Peak | Spacewatch | MAS | 620 m | MPC · JPL |
| 561823 | 2015 VY_{102} | — | December 15, 2006 | Kitt Peak | Spacewatch | · | 2.0 km | MPC · JPL |
| 561824 | 2015 VE_{103} | — | October 13, 1998 | Kitt Peak | Spacewatch | · | 1.0 km | MPC · JPL |
| 561825 | 2015 VZ_{104} | — | October 20, 2007 | Mount Lemmon | Mount Lemmon Survey | · | 1.2 km | MPC · JPL |
| 561826 | 2015 VX_{106} | — | July 31, 2006 | Siding Spring | SSS | MAR | 1.6 km | MPC · JPL |
| 561827 | 2015 VS_{108} | — | August 21, 2015 | Haleakala | Pan-STARRS 1 | · | 680 m | MPC · JPL |
| 561828 | 2015 VX_{108} | — | January 18, 2013 | Mount Lemmon | Mount Lemmon Survey | V | 630 m | MPC · JPL |
| 561829 | 2015 VY_{109} | — | November 10, 2010 | Mount Lemmon | Mount Lemmon Survey | · | 2.2 km | MPC · JPL |
| 561830 | 2015 VR_{110} | — | May 3, 2003 | Kitt Peak | Spacewatch | · | 1.4 km | MPC · JPL |
| 561831 | 2015 VZ_{110} | — | July 26, 2011 | Haleakala | Pan-STARRS 1 | · | 1.1 km | MPC · JPL |
| 561832 | 2015 VP_{111} | — | September 26, 1992 | Kitt Peak | Spacewatch | · | 500 m | MPC · JPL |
| 561833 | 2015 VZ_{111} | — | October 23, 2011 | Kitt Peak | Spacewatch | ADE | 1.7 km | MPC · JPL |
| 561834 | 2015 VY_{112} | — | September 19, 2006 | Catalina | CSS | HNS | 1.8 km | MPC · JPL |
| 561835 | 2015 VZ_{112} | — | September 21, 2011 | Haleakala | Pan-STARRS 1 | · | 1.1 km | MPC · JPL |
| 561836 | 2015 VG_{113} | — | March 25, 2000 | Kitt Peak | Spacewatch | · | 1.7 km | MPC · JPL |
| 561837 | 2015 VM_{113} | — | February 12, 2004 | Kitt Peak | Spacewatch | MAR | 1.1 km | MPC · JPL |
| 561838 | 2015 VO_{113} | — | November 2, 2015 | Space Surveillance | Space Surveillance Telescope | · | 1.2 km | MPC · JPL |
| 561839 | 2015 VT_{113} | — | September 27, 2006 | Mount Lemmon | Mount Lemmon Survey | · | 1.2 km | MPC · JPL |
| 561840 | 2015 VJ_{115} | — | October 28, 2011 | Mount Lemmon | Mount Lemmon Survey | · | 1.6 km | MPC · JPL |
| 561841 | 2015 VS_{115} | — | December 22, 2008 | Kitt Peak | Spacewatch | · | 1.3 km | MPC · JPL |
| 561842 | 2015 VT_{115} | — | November 26, 2010 | Mount Lemmon | Mount Lemmon Survey | · | 1.7 km | MPC · JPL |
| 561843 | 2015 VK_{116} | — | November 20, 2011 | Kitt Peak | Spacewatch | · | 1.2 km | MPC · JPL |
| 561844 | 2015 VZ_{116} | — | September 19, 2011 | Haleakala | Pan-STARRS 1 | · | 1.2 km | MPC · JPL |
| 561845 | 2015 VB_{117} | — | November 1, 2015 | Catalina | CSS | · | 830 m | MPC · JPL |
| 561846 | 2015 VW_{117} | — | October 25, 2011 | Kitt Peak | Spacewatch | · | 1.0 km | MPC · JPL |
| 561847 | 2015 VB_{118} | — | November 1, 2015 | Kitt Peak | Spacewatch | NYS | 1.0 km | MPC · JPL |
| 561848 | 2015 VT_{118} | — | October 22, 2006 | Mount Lemmon | Mount Lemmon Survey | EUN | 1.0 km | MPC · JPL |
| 561849 | 2015 VE_{119} | — | November 20, 2008 | Mount Lemmon | Mount Lemmon Survey | · | 860 m | MPC · JPL |
| 561850 | 2015 VJ_{119} | — | December 20, 2004 | Mount Lemmon | Mount Lemmon Survey | V | 760 m | MPC · JPL |
| 561851 | 2015 VM_{120} | — | September 29, 2008 | Catalina | CSS | · | 650 m | MPC · JPL |
| 561852 | 2015 VQ_{121} | — | November 26, 2011 | Mount Lemmon | Mount Lemmon Survey | · | 870 m | MPC · JPL |
| 561853 | 2015 VR_{121} | — | May 21, 2014 | Haleakala | Pan-STARRS 1 | · | 870 m | MPC · JPL |
| 561854 | 2015 VW_{121} | — | August 4, 2002 | Palomar | NEAT | MAR | 1.2 km | MPC · JPL |
| 561855 | 2015 VX_{122} | — | November 6, 2008 | Kitt Peak | Spacewatch | · | 1.1 km | MPC · JPL |
| 561856 | 2015 VV_{123} | — | November 11, 2007 | Mount Lemmon | Mount Lemmon Survey | · | 1.4 km | MPC · JPL |
| 561857 | 2015 VX_{124} | — | January 22, 2004 | Socorro | LINEAR | (5) | 1.2 km | MPC · JPL |
| 561858 | 2015 VQ_{125} | — | September 3, 2005 | Palomar | NEAT | · | 890 m | MPC · JPL |
| 561859 | 2015 VJ_{128} | — | November 1, 2015 | Kitt Peak | Spacewatch | V | 510 m | MPC · JPL |
| 561860 | 2015 VM_{128} | — | February 8, 2008 | Kitt Peak | Spacewatch | MIS | 1.8 km | MPC · JPL |
| 561861 | 2015 VJ_{129} | — | December 9, 2004 | Kitt Peak | Spacewatch | MAS | 620 m | MPC · JPL |
| 561862 | 2015 VV_{129} | — | May 4, 2000 | Apache Point | SDSS Collaboration | · | 2.1 km | MPC · JPL |
| 561863 | 2015 VF_{130} | — | April 19, 2007 | Mount Lemmon | Mount Lemmon Survey | MAS | 740 m | MPC · JPL |
| 561864 | 2015 VM_{130} | — | November 4, 2004 | Catalina | CSS | · | 1.1 km | MPC · JPL |
| 561865 | 2015 VO_{130} | — | September 9, 2015 | Haleakala | Pan-STARRS 1 | · | 990 m | MPC · JPL |
| 561866 | 2015 VS_{130} | — | January 30, 2004 | Kitt Peak | Spacewatch | (5) | 1.1 km | MPC · JPL |
| 561867 | 2015 VU_{130} | — | October 20, 2011 | Mount Lemmon | Mount Lemmon Survey | · | 1.2 km | MPC · JPL |
| 561868 | 2015 VH_{132} | — | August 21, 2015 | Haleakala | Pan-STARRS 1 | · | 630 m | MPC · JPL |
| 561869 | 2015 VQ_{132} | — | October 10, 2015 | Catalina | CSS | · | 730 m | MPC · JPL |
| 561870 | 2015 VE_{133} | — | January 6, 2013 | Mount Lemmon | Mount Lemmon Survey | · | 1.1 km | MPC · JPL |
| 561871 | 2015 VN_{133} | — | September 29, 2003 | Kitt Peak | Spacewatch | · | 1.0 km | MPC · JPL |
| 561872 | 2015 VZ_{133} | — | September 16, 2004 | Kitt Peak | Spacewatch | V | 540 m | MPC · JPL |
| 561873 | 2015 VV_{135} | — | October 15, 2004 | Mount Lemmon | Mount Lemmon Survey | NYS | 1.2 km | MPC · JPL |
| 561874 | 2015 VQ_{136} | — | December 5, 2002 | Socorro | LINEAR | · | 1.7 km | MPC · JPL |
| 561875 | 2015 VU_{136} | — | October 9, 2015 | XuYi | PMO NEO Survey Program | · | 1.9 km | MPC · JPL |
| 561876 | 2015 VW_{136} | — | September 19, 2015 | Haleakala | Pan-STARRS 1 | · | 1.5 km | MPC · JPL |
| 561877 | 2015 VB_{137} | — | February 6, 1997 | Kitt Peak | Spacewatch | · | 1.0 km | MPC · JPL |
| 561878 | 2015 VH_{137} | — | October 9, 2015 | Haleakala | Pan-STARRS 1 | · | 1.1 km | MPC · JPL |
| 561879 | 2015 VL_{137} | — | February 8, 2013 | Haleakala | Pan-STARRS 1 | V | 570 m | MPC · JPL |
| 561880 | 2015 VU_{140} | — | February 9, 2013 | Haleakala | Pan-STARRS 1 | NYS | 890 m | MPC · JPL |
| 561881 | 2015 VX_{140} | — | January 11, 2008 | Kitt Peak | Spacewatch | · | 1.0 km | MPC · JPL |
| 561882 | 2015 VS_{141} | — | December 5, 2007 | Kitt Peak | Spacewatch | · | 830 m | MPC · JPL |
| 561883 | 2015 VU_{141} | — | October 20, 2015 | XuYi | PMO NEO Survey Program | · | 2.7 km | MPC · JPL |
| 561884 | 2015 VX_{141} | — | November 9, 2015 | Mount Lemmon | Mount Lemmon Survey | · | 1.4 km | MPC · JPL |
| 561885 | 2015 VD_{142} | — | December 22, 2008 | Mount Lemmon | Mount Lemmon Survey | · | 1.0 km | MPC · JPL |
| 561886 | 2015 VY_{142} | — | September 23, 2015 | Haleakala | Pan-STARRS 1 | · | 1.9 km | MPC · JPL |
| 561887 | 2015 VF_{143} | — | December 8, 2007 | Bisei | BATTeRS | (5) | 1.2 km | MPC · JPL |
| 561888 | 2015 VN_{144} | — | March 31, 2013 | Mount Lemmon | Mount Lemmon Survey | · | 1.2 km | MPC · JPL |
| 561889 | 2015 VR_{144} | — | January 19, 2005 | Kitt Peak | Spacewatch | SUL | 2.2 km | MPC · JPL |
| 561890 | 2015 VX_{144} | — | October 16, 2002 | Palomar | NEAT | · | 1.3 km | MPC · JPL |
| 561891 | 2015 VW_{145} | — | November 24, 2011 | Mount Lemmon | Mount Lemmon Survey | EUN | 1.3 km | MPC · JPL |
| 561892 | 2015 VV_{146} | — | August 3, 2014 | Haleakala | Pan-STARRS 1 | · | 1.1 km | MPC · JPL |
| 561893 | 2015 VC_{147} | — | November 19, 2008 | Kitt Peak | Spacewatch | PHO | 740 m | MPC · JPL |
| 561894 | 2015 VS_{147} | — | April 7, 2014 | Mount Lemmon | Mount Lemmon Survey | · | 780 m | MPC · JPL |
| 561895 | 2015 VL_{150} | — | January 13, 2008 | Kitt Peak | Spacewatch | (5) | 1.1 km | MPC · JPL |
| 561896 | 2015 VW_{151} | — | November 2, 2010 | Mount Lemmon | Mount Lemmon Survey | · | 1.3 km | MPC · JPL |
| 561897 | 2015 VE_{152} | — | November 3, 2007 | Mount Lemmon | Mount Lemmon Survey | · | 1.5 km | MPC · JPL |
| 561898 | 2015 VM_{155} | — | October 4, 1996 | Kitt Peak | Spacewatch | · | 1.3 km | MPC · JPL |
| 561899 | 2015 VD_{156} | — | November 10, 2015 | Mount Lemmon | Mount Lemmon Survey | · | 1.6 km | MPC · JPL |
| 561900 | 2015 VF_{156} | — | September 24, 2011 | Haleakala | Pan-STARRS 1 | · | 800 m | MPC · JPL |

== 561901–562000 ==
back to top

| Designation | | | Discovery | | | Properties | | Ref |
| Permanent | Provisional | Named after | Date | Site | Discoverer(s) | Category | Diam. | Ref |
|---|---|---|---|---|---|---|---|---|
| 561901 | 2015 VO_{156} | — | March 7, 2008 | Catalina | CSS | · | 1.8 km | MPC · JPL |
| 561902 | 2015 VT_{156} | — | December 18, 2007 | Mount Lemmon | Mount Lemmon Survey | · | 1.1 km | MPC · JPL |
| 561903 | 2015 VZ_{156} | — | July 8, 2014 | Haleakala | Pan-STARRS 1 | · | 2.2 km | MPC · JPL |
| 561904 | 2015 VC_{157} | — | November 13, 2015 | Mount Lemmon | Mount Lemmon Survey | · | 1.4 km | MPC · JPL |
| 561905 | 2015 VR_{157} | — | May 19, 2006 | Catalina | CSS | · | 1.6 km | MPC · JPL |
| 561906 | 2015 VS_{157} | — | January 13, 2005 | Kitt Peak | Spacewatch | · | 1.2 km | MPC · JPL |
| 561907 | 2015 VF_{159} | — | November 2, 2015 | Haleakala | Pan-STARRS 1 | · | 1.0 km | MPC · JPL |
| 561908 | 2015 VO_{159} | — | March 17, 2013 | Nogales | M. Schwartz, P. R. Holvorcem | · | 1.0 km | MPC · JPL |
| 561909 | 2015 VR_{159} | — | February 9, 2005 | Kitt Peak | Spacewatch | · | 1.0 km | MPC · JPL |
| 561910 | 2015 VY_{159} | — | October 30, 2010 | Mount Lemmon | Mount Lemmon Survey | · | 2.2 km | MPC · JPL |
| 561911 Kézandor | 2015 VE_{160} | Kézandor | November 1, 2010 | Piszkéstető | K. Sárneczky, Z. Kuli | · | 2.1 km | MPC · JPL |
| 561912 | 2015 VQ_{160} | — | November 7, 2015 | Haleakala | Pan-STARRS 1 | EUN | 920 m | MPC · JPL |
| 561913 | 2015 VU_{160} | — | November 18, 2011 | Mount Lemmon | Mount Lemmon Survey | BRG | 990 m | MPC · JPL |
| 561914 | 2015 VK_{161} | — | October 22, 2011 | Mount Lemmon | Mount Lemmon Survey | · | 910 m | MPC · JPL |
| 561915 | 2015 VQ_{161} | — | October 21, 2011 | Mount Lemmon | Mount Lemmon Survey | MAR | 810 m | MPC · JPL |
| 561916 | 2015 VD_{162} | — | June 27, 2013 | Mount Lemmon | Mount Lemmon Survey | HNS | 920 m | MPC · JPL |
| 561917 | 2015 VF_{162} | — | January 23, 2012 | Oukaïmeden | M. Ory | · | 1.5 km | MPC · JPL |
| 561918 | 2015 VR_{162} | — | November 10, 2015 | Mount Lemmon | Mount Lemmon Survey | V | 580 m | MPC · JPL |
| 561919 | 2015 VY_{162} | — | November 27, 2011 | Mount Lemmon | Mount Lemmon Survey | · | 740 m | MPC · JPL |
| 561920 | 2015 VW_{163} | — | November 14, 2015 | Mount Lemmon | Mount Lemmon Survey | EUN | 940 m | MPC · JPL |
| 561921 | 2015 VH_{164} | — | November 9, 2015 | Mount Lemmon | Mount Lemmon Survey | · | 1.3 km | MPC · JPL |
| 561922 | 2015 VF_{185} | — | November 13, 2015 | Mount Lemmon | Mount Lemmon Survey | PHO | 1.1 km | MPC · JPL |
| 561923 | 2015 VE_{188} | — | November 9, 2015 | Mount Lemmon | Mount Lemmon Survey | · | 990 m | MPC · JPL |
| 561924 | 2015 VL_{188} | — | August 27, 2009 | Kitt Peak | Spacewatch | THM | 1.4 km | MPC · JPL |
| 561925 | 2015 VG_{189} | — | November 12, 2015 | Mount Lemmon | Mount Lemmon Survey | · | 1.1 km | MPC · JPL |
| 561926 | 2015 VA_{197} | — | November 14, 2015 | Mount Lemmon | Mount Lemmon Survey | · | 2.0 km | MPC · JPL |
| 561927 | 2015 WH_{1} | — | May 30, 2012 | Mount Lemmon | Mount Lemmon Survey | · | 330 m | MPC · JPL |
| 561928 | 2015 WK_{3} | — | January 31, 2006 | Kitt Peak | Spacewatch | · | 940 m | MPC · JPL |
| 561929 | 2015 WY_{3} | — | November 3, 2015 | Mount Lemmon | Mount Lemmon Survey | · | 720 m | MPC · JPL |
| 561930 | 2015 WH_{4} | — | February 15, 2013 | Haleakala | Pan-STARRS 1 | · | 1.1 km | MPC · JPL |
| 561931 | 2015 WB_{5} | — | November 24, 2003 | Kitt Peak | Spacewatch | · | 790 m | MPC · JPL |
| 561932 | 2015 WF_{5} | — | November 11, 2007 | Mount Lemmon | Mount Lemmon Survey | MAR | 1.3 km | MPC · JPL |
| 561933 | 2015 WM_{5} | — | November 14, 2015 | Mount Lemmon | Mount Lemmon Survey | · | 1.1 km | MPC · JPL |
| 561934 | 2015 WR_{5} | — | April 29, 2009 | Kitt Peak | Spacewatch | HNS | 1.3 km | MPC · JPL |
| 561935 | 2015 WN_{6} | — | December 18, 2007 | Mount Lemmon | Mount Lemmon Survey | · | 1.3 km | MPC · JPL |
| 561936 | 2015 WT_{6} | — | October 24, 2001 | Palomar | NEAT | · | 730 m | MPC · JPL |
| 561937 | 2015 WL_{8} | — | November 14, 2007 | Mount Lemmon | Mount Lemmon Survey | · | 1.1 km | MPC · JPL |
| 561938 | 2015 WN_{9} | — | April 16, 2013 | Haleakala | Pan-STARRS 1 | · | 1.5 km | MPC · JPL |
| 561939 | 2015 WS_{9} | — | December 19, 2007 | Mount Lemmon | Mount Lemmon Survey | KON | 2.3 km | MPC · JPL |
| 561940 | 2015 WV_{9} | — | September 23, 2015 | Haleakala | Pan-STARRS 1 | · | 1.9 km | MPC · JPL |
| 561941 | 2015 WX_{9} | — | December 20, 2011 | ESA OGS | ESA OGS | (5) | 1.3 km | MPC · JPL |
| 561942 | 2015 WY_{9} | — | January 28, 2012 | Črni Vrh | Mikuž, H. | JUN | 970 m | MPC · JPL |
| 561943 | 2015 WL_{11} | — | July 4, 2014 | Haleakala | Pan-STARRS 1 | · | 1.0 km | MPC · JPL |
| 561944 | 2015 WN_{13} | — | November 25, 2005 | Catalina | CSS | · | 940 m | MPC · JPL |
| 561945 | 2015 WO_{13} | — | November 10, 2004 | Kitt Peak | Spacewatch | · | 1.2 km | MPC · JPL |
| 561946 | 2015 WF_{18} | — | December 2, 2010 | Mount Lemmon | Mount Lemmon Survey | · | 2.0 km | MPC · JPL |
| 561947 | 2015 WK_{18} | — | February 19, 2012 | Catalina | CSS | · | 1.3 km | MPC · JPL |
| 561948 | 2015 WW_{18} | — | January 18, 2008 | Mount Lemmon | Mount Lemmon Survey | · | 1.3 km | MPC · JPL |
| 561949 | 2015 WX_{21} | — | November 22, 2015 | Mount Lemmon | Mount Lemmon Survey | (5) | 900 m | MPC · JPL |
| 561950 | 2015 WA_{22} | — | December 13, 2006 | Mount Lemmon | Mount Lemmon Survey | · | 1.8 km | MPC · JPL |
| 561951 | 2015 WB_{22} | — | July 27, 2005 | Palomar | NEAT | · | 2.3 km | MPC · JPL |
| 561952 | 2015 WC_{22} | — | July 13, 2013 | Haleakala | Pan-STARRS 1 | · | 1.7 km | MPC · JPL |
| 561953 | 2015 WD_{22} | — | July 8, 2014 | Haleakala | Pan-STARRS 1 | · | 1.5 km | MPC · JPL |
| 561954 | 2015 WG_{22} | — | January 27, 2007 | Kitt Peak | Spacewatch | · | 1.8 km | MPC · JPL |
| 561955 | 2015 WH_{22} | — | December 10, 2010 | Mount Lemmon | Mount Lemmon Survey | · | 1.6 km | MPC · JPL |
| 561956 | 2015 WO_{22} | — | November 16, 2015 | Haleakala | Pan-STARRS 1 | · | 1.3 km | MPC · JPL |
| 561957 | 2015 WD_{23} | — | November 21, 2015 | Mount Lemmon | Mount Lemmon Survey | · | 2.4 km | MPC · JPL |
| 561958 | 2015 WP_{29} | — | November 18, 2015 | Haleakala | Pan-STARRS 1 | LIX | 2.7 km | MPC · JPL |
| 561959 | 2015 WS_{32} | — | November 19, 2015 | Mount Lemmon | Mount Lemmon Survey | · | 1.4 km | MPC · JPL |
| 561960 | 2015 XR_{4} | — | April 23, 2014 | Mount Lemmon | Mount Lemmon Survey | · | 800 m | MPC · JPL |
| 561961 | 2015 XU_{4} | — | September 19, 2015 | Haleakala | Pan-STARRS 1 | HNS | 1.4 km | MPC · JPL |
| 561962 | 2015 XP_{6} | — | July 28, 2014 | Haleakala | Pan-STARRS 1 | · | 1.3 km | MPC · JPL |
| 561963 | 2015 XY_{7} | — | October 26, 2008 | Mount Lemmon | Mount Lemmon Survey | · | 740 m | MPC · JPL |
| 561964 | 2015 XJ_{8} | — | September 19, 2015 | Haleakala | Pan-STARRS 1 | · | 1.1 km | MPC · JPL |
| 561965 | 2015 XV_{8} | — | May 13, 2007 | Mount Lemmon | Mount Lemmon Survey | · | 800 m | MPC · JPL |
| 561966 | 2015 XZ_{8} | — | January 18, 2004 | Palomar | NEAT | KON | 1.8 km | MPC · JPL |
| 561967 | 2015 XB_{9} | — | January 17, 2009 | Mount Lemmon | Mount Lemmon Survey | · | 1.0 km | MPC · JPL |
| 561968 | 2015 XA_{10} | — | June 16, 2014 | Mount Lemmon | Mount Lemmon Survey | · | 1.1 km | MPC · JPL |
| 561969 | 2015 XF_{10} | — | November 28, 2011 | Kitt Peak | Spacewatch | · | 940 m | MPC · JPL |
| 561970 | 2015 XK_{10} | — | December 20, 2011 | Črni Vrh | Mikuž, H. | · | 1.3 km | MPC · JPL |
| 561971 | 2015 XL_{10} | — | February 28, 2008 | Kitt Peak | Spacewatch | GEF | 1.2 km | MPC · JPL |
| 561972 | 2015 XF_{13} | — | November 1, 2015 | Kitt Peak | Spacewatch | · | 1.3 km | MPC · JPL |
| 561973 | 2015 XT_{16} | — | January 24, 1996 | Kitt Peak | Spacewatch | (5) | 980 m | MPC · JPL |
| 561974 | 2015 XB_{17} | — | January 17, 2013 | Kitt Peak | Spacewatch | V | 600 m | MPC · JPL |
| 561975 | 2015 XN_{18} | — | March 6, 2013 | Haleakala | Pan-STARRS 1 | · | 1.1 km | MPC · JPL |
| 561976 | 2015 XU_{19} | — | December 18, 2007 | Mount Lemmon | Mount Lemmon Survey | · | 930 m | MPC · JPL |
| 561977 | 2015 XZ_{19} | — | April 25, 2007 | Kitt Peak | Spacewatch | ERI | 1.2 km | MPC · JPL |
| 561978 | 2015 XD_{20} | — | January 12, 2008 | Mount Lemmon | Mount Lemmon Survey | · | 1.0 km | MPC · JPL |
| 561979 | 2015 XF_{25} | — | September 5, 2000 | Apache Point | SDSS Collaboration | · | 1.3 km | MPC · JPL |
| 561980 | 2015 XU_{25} | — | April 30, 2009 | Mount Lemmon | Mount Lemmon Survey | · | 1.4 km | MPC · JPL |
| 561981 | 2015 XT_{29} | — | April 9, 2010 | Mount Lemmon | Mount Lemmon Survey | V | 650 m | MPC · JPL |
| 561982 | 2015 XV_{29} | — | October 19, 2011 | Mount Lemmon | Mount Lemmon Survey | · | 980 m | MPC · JPL |
| 561983 | 2015 XX_{33} | — | November 29, 2003 | Kitt Peak | Spacewatch | · | 1.2 km | MPC · JPL |
| 561984 | 2015 XK_{34} | — | November 19, 2006 | Kitt Peak | Spacewatch | · | 1.5 km | MPC · JPL |
| 561985 | 2015 XW_{34} | — | November 3, 2007 | Mount Lemmon | Mount Lemmon Survey | · | 1.1 km | MPC · JPL |
| 561986 | 2015 XZ_{34} | — | September 25, 2011 | Haleakala | Pan-STARRS 1 | V | 630 m | MPC · JPL |
| 561987 | 2015 XG_{37} | — | November 19, 2015 | Kitt Peak | Spacewatch | · | 910 m | MPC · JPL |
| 561988 | 2015 XL_{39} | — | September 23, 2011 | Haleakala | Pan-STARRS 1 | · | 880 m | MPC · JPL |
| 561989 | 2015 XW_{42} | — | June 29, 2014 | Mount Lemmon | Mount Lemmon Survey | · | 980 m | MPC · JPL |
| 561990 | 2015 XF_{44} | — | December 17, 2003 | Kitt Peak | Spacewatch | · | 1.1 km | MPC · JPL |
| 561991 | 2015 XM_{47} | — | February 8, 2013 | Haleakala | Pan-STARRS 1 | · | 1.4 km | MPC · JPL |
| 561992 | 2015 XB_{49} | — | October 20, 2011 | Mount Lemmon | Mount Lemmon Survey | PHO | 830 m | MPC · JPL |
| 561993 | 2015 XF_{49} | — | April 26, 2007 | Kitt Peak | Spacewatch | · | 580 m | MPC · JPL |
| 561994 | 2015 XO_{51} | — | September 25, 2015 | Haleakala | Pan-STARRS 1 | · | 950 m | MPC · JPL |
| 561995 | 2015 XX_{52} | — | October 19, 2015 | Haleakala | Pan-STARRS 1 | · | 1.2 km | MPC · JPL |
| 561996 | 2015 XG_{53} | — | October 8, 2008 | Catalina | CSS | · | 630 m | MPC · JPL |
| 561997 | 2015 XO_{53} | — | December 2, 2015 | Haleakala | Pan-STARRS 1 | · | 890 m | MPC · JPL |
| 561998 | 2015 XB_{54} | — | November 26, 2011 | Mount Lemmon | Mount Lemmon Survey | · | 910 m | MPC · JPL |
| 561999 | 2015 XM_{54} | — | October 9, 2015 | Haleakala | Pan-STARRS 1 | V | 510 m | MPC · JPL |
| 562000 | 2015 XW_{55} | — | June 9, 2011 | Mount Lemmon | Mount Lemmon Survey | · | 1.5 km | MPC · JPL |

back to top

== Meaning of names ==
As minor planet discoveries are confirmed, they are given a permanent number by the IAU's Minor Planet Center (MPC), and the discoverers can then submit names for them, following the IAU's naming conventions. The list below concerns those minor planets in the specified number-range that have received names, and explains the meanings of those names.

Official naming citations of newly named small Solar System bodies are approved and published in a bulletin by IAU's Working Group for Small Bodies Nomenclature (WGSBN). Before May 2021, citations were published in MPC's Minor Planet Circulars for many decades. Recent citations can also be found on the JPL Small-Body Database (SBDB). Until his death in 2016, German astronomer Lutz D. Schmadel compiled these citations into the Dictionary of Minor Planet Names (DMP) and regularly updated the collection.

Based on Paul Herget's The Names of the Minor Planets, Schmadel also researched the unclear origin of numerous asteroids, most of which had been named prior to World War II. This article incorporates text from this source, which is in the public domain: SBDB New namings may only be added to this list below after official publication as the preannouncement of names is condemned. The WGSBN publishes a comprehensive guideline for the naming rules of non-cometary small Solar System bodies.

| Named minor planet | Provisional | This minor planet was named for... | Ref · Catalog |
|---|---|---|---|
| 561490 Tonyforward | 2015 TH_{168} | Tony Forward (b. 1979), a British finance professional. | IAU · 561490 |
| 561911 Kézandor | 2015 VE_{160} | Andor Kéz (1891–1968), a Hungarian geographer and university professor. | IAU · 561911 |
