= List of named minor planets: 500000–599999 =

This is a partial list of named minor planets in numerical order. It contains a total of 400 entries as of 9 November 2026. Minor planets for which no article exist are displayed in grey color and redirect to the list of minor planets (see List of minor planets § Main index).

== From 500,000 to 599,999 ==
- 500000 Kaichi
- 500170 Lusitano
- 501132 Runkel
- 503033 New Hampshire
- 505906 Raozihe
- 506074 Svarog
- 507490 Possum
- 508440 Lewishamilton
- 509018 Wiese
- 509761 Umberto
- 510045 Vincematteo
- 510466 Varna
- 511238 Cuixiangqun
- 513340 Xianshiyou
- 513557 NIGPAS
- 514107 Kaʻepaokaʻāwela
- 514986 Zhangweiguo
- 515812 Pueo
- 516560 Annapolisroyal
- 517104 Redinger
- 517894 Rolfrohwedder
- 518458 Roblambert
- 518523 Bryanshumaker
- 518886 Wheelock
- 519419 Guyewang
- 520585 Saci
- 522466 Auyeung
- 522563 Randyflynn
- 523954 Guman
- 524522 Zoozve
- 524607 Davecarter
- 524638 Kaffkamargit
- 526460 Ceciliakoocen
- 526492 Theaket
- 526997 Hohai
- 527205 Zhongdatianwen
- 528489 Ntuef
- 528997 Tanakatakenori
- 529729 Xida
- 529828 Jinhuayizhong
- 530721 Isscas
- 530739 Nanligong
- 530768 Nanpu
- 532037 Chiminigagua
- 533671 Nabu
- 534299 Parazynski
- 534390 Huningsheng
- 535266 Chorzów
- 535353 Antoniwilk
- 535530 Gustavborn
- 535769 Klimkovsky
- 537170 Gerazhukov
- 540413 Nikzad
- 541132 Leleākūhonua
- 541184 Babjak
- 541185 Boldogkői
- 541200 Komjádibéla
- 541222 Ianbaker
- 541288 Rogerhaynes
- 541318 Mirasteilas
- 541487 Silviapablo
- 541508 Liucixin
- 541550 Schickbéla
- 541565 Gucklerkároly
- 541571 Schulekfrigyes
- 541575 Mikhailnazarov
- 541582 Tóthimre
- 541587 Paparó
- 541618 Magyaribéla
- 541627 Halmospál
- 541631 Kirbulychev
- 541691 Ranschburg
- 541741 Fado
- 541776 Oláhkatalin
- 541801 Kendurkar
- 541842 Amygreaves
- 541878 Jessicatallulah
- 541897 TRAPPIST
- 541982 Grendel
- 541983 Matthiaspenselin
- 541992 Lukácsbéla
- 542026 Kaszásattila
- 542084 Olegverkhodanov
- 542246 Kulcsár
- 542461 Slovinský
- 542509 Lyatoshynsky
- 542561 Ritajochen
- 542568 Erichess
- 542600 Lindahall
- 542762 Davidlee
- 542857 Elmi
- 542888 Confino
- 542926 Manteca
- 543018 ROTAT
- 543060 Liefke
- 543061 Ruthsager
- 543081 Albertducrocq
- 543198 Rastislavmráz
- 543229 Matiganis
- 543302 Hamvasbéla
- 543315 Asmakhammari
- 543581 Laurenrubyjane
- 543698 Miromesaroš
- 543914 Tessedik
- 544033 Lihsing
- 544309 Reuss
- 544325 Péczbéla
- 544541 Srholec
- 544618 Bugátpál
- 545060 Drapáljános
- 545167 Bonfini
- 545394 Rossetter
- 545560 Fersman
- 545561 Nesbø
- 545564 Sabonis
- 545565 Borysten
- 545571 Carlobaccigalupi
- 545619 Lapuška
- 545651 Lilyjames
- 545784 Kelemenjános
- 545839 Hernánletelier
- 545985 Galinaermolenko
- 546025 Ábrahámpéter
- 546049 Zhujin
- 546098 Kosaka
- 546186 Vasylivchenko
- 546235 Kolbenheyer
- 546275 Kozák
- 546286 Fuchsjenő
- 546396 Szilágyiáron
- 546471 Szipál
- 546498 Demjénferenc
- 546515 Almásy
- 546756 Sunguoyou
- 546842 Ruanjiangao
- 546843 Xuzhijian
- 546844 Jinzhangwei
- 546845 Wulumuqiyizhong
- 546846 Sunpeiyuan
- 547345 Kennethchambers
- 547398 Turánpál
- 547400 Szakcsilakatos
- 547508 Perehorts
- 547599 Virághalmy
- 547612 Károligáspár
- 547664 Ozdín
- 547666 Morgon
- 547705 Paálgyörgy
- 547779 Pogo
- 548032 Ensisheim
- 548263 Alexandertutov
- 548624 Ekwerike
- 548690 Hazucha
- 548715 Stus
- 549107 Hackitamás
- 549151 Serra-Ricart
- 549185 Herczeg
- 549228 Labuda
- 549229 Bánjános
- 549418 Andreifesenko
- 549648 Shirokov
- 549650 Bilibin
- 549663 Barczaszabolcs
- 549676 Thanjavur
- 549706 Spbuni
- 549744 Heimpál
- 549873 Portsevskii
- 549961 Földesistván
- 549996 Dmitriiguliutin
- 550034 Reitsam
- 550083 Szécsényi-Nagy
- 550139 Venn
- 550525 Sigourneyweaver
- 550666 Difrancesco
- 550832 Silvanacopceski
- 550942 Kurtág
- 551014 Gorman
- 551082 Tsiongtiong
- 551091 Flórferenc
- 551212 Mathieuudriot
- 551231 Żywiec
- 551233 Miguelanton
- 551390 Thomaskeßler
- 551510 Mariuszkukava
- 551601 Antonijové
- 551878 Stoeger
- 551900 Laneways
- 552385 Rochechouart
- 552420 Flodubeyjames
- 552681 Sósvera
- 552708 Ödmangovender
- 552727 Hauszmann
- 552733 Grétsylászló
- 552746 Annanobili
- 552748 Garasdezső
- 552750 Valasek
- 552784 Jeanbrahier
- 552847 Steinaurél
- 552855 Hoitsy
- 552888 Felixrodriguez
- 553035 Faikmusayev
- 553076 Maturkanič
- 553078 Balassibálint
- 553438 Bércziszaniszló
- 553532 Alfiejohnpercy
- 554239 Montseypedro
- 554268 Marksylvester
- 554317 Rorywoodhams
- 554466 Pablomotos
- 554648 Olaffischer
- 554704 Széppataki
- 554709 Magdastavinschi
- 554766 Dieterkasan
- 554879 Kissgyula
- 554959 Lasica
- 554979 Michaelmazur
- 555092 Annasusanne
- 555112 Monika
- 555120 Ottoguthier
- 555128 Birštonas
- 555152 Oproiu
- 555227 Claraisabella
- 555292 Bakels
- 555468 Tokarczuk
- 555802 Chengyen
- 555816 Danielposey
- 555955 Lurçat
- 557045 Nadolschi
- 557396 Crailsheim
- 558195 Eugengindl
- 558398 Nagysándor
- 559135 Richardgreaves
- 559521 Sonbird
- 559717 Bródyjános
- 560085 Perperikon
- 560354 Chrisnolan
- 560388 Normafa
- 560522 Gombaszögi
- 560794 Ugoboncompagni
- 561490 Tonyforward
- 561911 Kézandor
- 562008 Samtackeff
- 562237 Chentsov
- 562446 Pilinszky
- 562936 Bródyimre
- 562964 Hudin
- 562971 Johannhagen
- 562979 Barabásmiklós
- 563197 ʻIke Leʻa
- 563285 Reinerschwarz
- 563318 ten Kate
- 563707 Némethgeri
- 563716 Szinyeimersepál
- 563853 Andrewdubeyjames
- 564052 Melissagraham
- 564280 Tudorica
- 564780 Igorkarachentsev
- 564808 Pallai
- 565039 Meganengel
- 565122 Markbowman
- 565139 Sumshchyna
- 565184 Janusz
- 565571 Shtol
- 565780 Kopaszimre
- 566277 Sharonchan
- 566631 Svábhegy
- 566939 Petrucrăciun
- 566986 Štepka
- 567010 Kanyósándor
- 567329 Zinaida
- 567490 Bánkyvilma
- 567580 Latuni
- 568092 Alexschmid
- 568959 Michaellesko
- 569484 Irisdement
- 570448 Travismetcalfe
- 570814 Nauru
- 571000 Kowright
- 571117 Mikehudson
- 571398 Jasonrowe
- 571535 Okunoto
- 571938 Mariaeimmart
- 571957 Jacekwierzchoś
- 572217 Dramba
- 573731 Matsnev
- 573759 Rocheva
- 573814 Sergeyzvyagin
- 574300 Curelaru
- 574506 Sopronilíceum
- 574546 Kondorgusztáv
- 574548 Plume
- 574570 Khabibullin
- 574635 Jánossy
- 574691 Horgerantal
- 574742 Annatsybuleva
- 575108 Doyrantsi
- 575195 Carpineti
- 575498 Lampérthgyula
- 575511 Bükk
- 576186 Lefebvre
- 576373 Wolfgangbusch
- 576465 Craigwoodhams
- 576466 Scherpenisse
- 576793 Károlyiamy
- 576853 Rafalreszelewski
- 576870 Országlili
- 576901 Adagio
- 577754 Janačerbová
- 577881 Pálinkáslibor
- 577883 Yelenametyolkina
- 578053 Jordillorca
- 578164 Rerrichbéla
- 578168 Miaochangwen
- 578202 Philippetalbot
- 578249 Josephcarr
- 578622 Fergezsuzsa
- 579724 Rómerflóris
- 579742 Annamareike
- 579785 Kepesgyula
- 579787 Formentera
- 579890 Mocnik
- 580123 Gedek
- 580301 Aznarmacías
- 580311 Saselemér
- 580619 Harangiszabolcs
- 581587 Pazmany
- 582910 Tormazsófia
- 582928 Smriglio
- 583418 Herbertgush
- 583729 Tejfel
- 583972 Rybnikov
- 584311 Pozhlakov
- 584947 Shistovsky
- 585349 Eeuwes
- 585635 Ruxandratoma
- 586003 Monspartsarolta
- 587299 Holmgren
- 588108 Boteropop
- 588255 Hantang
- 588905 Salvadornogueira
- 589175 Romainguélat
- 589253 Fabrika
- 589360 Yulialinde
- 589558 Nishikawa
- 589718 Csopak
- 589780 Ajka
- 589841 Strobl
- 589887 Fellnerjakab
- 589944 Suhua
- 590269 Steinberger
- 590335 Mikhailkuzmin
- 590377 Lisacampbell
- 590464 Helenlawson
- 590666 Jianguo
- 590739 Miloslavov
- 590761 Fixin
- 590888 Chengda
- 591000 Galaverni
- 591201 Johnpye
- 591347 Tarczylajos
- 591396 Presser
- 591426 Adalawson
- 591592 Carlanderson
- 591763 Orishutʹ
- 591808 Dienesvaléria
- 591861 Sergeyyazev
- 591964 Jakucs
- 592170 Arkadyinin
- 592244 Daukantas
- 592710 Lenghu
- 592750 Seiichifujiwara
- 593195 Lavinaahmed
- 594012 Bulavina
- 594032 Reyhersamuel
- 594782 Kacperwierzchoś
- 594913 ꞌAylóꞌchaxnim
- 594983 Stéphaniecôté
- 595362 Schievink
- 595480 Luidens
- 596543 Ubu
- 595583 Annabelkarun
- 595590 Raphaelroose
- 595901 Lilybeaurepaire
- 596588 Jamesliebert
- 596687 Patrickcôté
- 596996 Suhantzong
- 597148 Chungmingshan
- 597319 Roxanesouad
- 597469 Denisleahy
- 597470 Lauraparker
- 597966 Laihe
- 597967 Pannai
- 597993 Bélesta
- 598719 Alegalli
- 598855 Agerer
- 598895 Artjuhs
- 599019 Jerzymadej
- 599083 Snezhko
- 599587 Shangjiaouni
- 599755 Alcarràs
back to top

== See also ==
- List of minor planet discoverers
- List of observatory codes
- Meanings of minor planet names § Index
