= List of minor planets: 565001–566000 =

The following is a partial list of minor planets, running from minor-planet number 565001 through 566000, inclusive. The primary data for this and other partial lists is based on JPL's "Small-Body Orbital Elements" and data available from the Minor Planet Center. Critical list information is also provided by the MPC, unless otherwise specified from Lowell Observatory. A detailed description of the table's columns and additional sources are given on the main page including a complete list of every page in this series, and a statistical break-up on the dynamical classification of minor planets.

Also see the summary list of all named bodies in numerical and alphabetical order, and the corresponding naming citations for the number range of this particular list. New namings may only be added to this list after official publication, as the preannouncement of names is condemned by the Working Group for Small Bodies Nomenclature of the International Astronomical Union.

Near-Earth obj.	MBA (inner)	MBA (outer)	Centaur
Mars-crosser	MBA (middle)	Jupiter trojan	Trans-Neptunian obj.
Unclassified

== 565001–565100 ==
Designation			Discovery			Properties		Ref
Permanent	Provisional	Named after	Date	Site	Discoverer(s)	Category	Diam.	Ref
565001	2017 BE_{2}	—	October 8, 2008	Kitt Peak	Spacewatch	·	1.1 km	MPC · JPL
565002	2017 BT_{2}	—	December 14, 2004	Kitt Peak	Spacewatch	·	1.8 km	MPC · JPL
565003	2017 BX_{2}	—	November 17, 2009	Mount Lemmon	Mount Lemmon Survey	·	690 m	MPC · JPL
565004	2017 BY_{4}	—	August 20, 2001	Cerro Tololo	Deep Ecliptic Survey	·	800 m	MPC · JPL
565005	2017 BZ_{4}	—	March 16, 2010	Mount Lemmon	Mount Lemmon Survey	·	1.0 km	MPC · JPL
565006	2017 BA_{5}	—	December 31, 2008	Kitt Peak	Spacewatch	·	1.2 km	MPC · JPL
565007	2017 BH_{7}	—	September 22, 2004	Kitt Peak	Spacewatch	PHO	900 m	MPC · JPL
565008	2017 BX_{7}	—	December 23, 2016	Haleakala	Pan-STARRS 1	EUN	1.0 km	MPC · JPL
565009	2017 BD_{8}	—	October 1, 2008	Mount Lemmon	Mount Lemmon Survey	·	1.1 km	MPC · JPL
565010	2017 BJ_{8}	—	February 13, 2009	Mount Lemmon	Mount Lemmon Survey	·	1.2 km	MPC · JPL
565011	2017 BM_{8}	—	April 5, 2003	Kitt Peak	Spacewatch	V	670 m	MPC · JPL
565012	2017 BP_{8}	—	April 14, 2005	Catalina	CSS	·	1.6 km	MPC · JPL
565013	2017 BU_{8}	—	November 6, 2012	Kitt Peak	Spacewatch	·	930 m	MPC · JPL
565014	2017 BX_{8}	—	December 4, 2007	Mount Lemmon	Mount Lemmon Survey	·	1.7 km	MPC · JPL
565015	2017 BY_{8}	—	November 15, 2006	Catalina	CSS	·	2.6 km	MPC · JPL
565016	2017 BU_{9}	—	September 25, 2012	Kitt Peak	Spacewatch	·	580 m	MPC · JPL
565017	2017 BZ_{9}	—	December 15, 2009	Mount Lemmon	Mount Lemmon Survey	·	930 m	MPC · JPL
565018	2017 BC_{10}	—	December 21, 2016	Oukaïmeden	M. Ory	·	580 m	MPC · JPL
565019	2017 BJ_{11}	—	November 30, 2008	Kitt Peak	Spacewatch	NYS	1.4 km	MPC · JPL
565020	2017 BK_{11}	—	October 19, 2000	Kitt Peak	Spacewatch	NYS	1.0 km	MPC · JPL
565021	2017 BV_{11}	—	October 8, 2012	Kitt Peak	Spacewatch	·	840 m	MPC · JPL
565022	2017 BZ_{11}	—	January 10, 2007	Mount Lemmon	Mount Lemmon Survey	·	660 m	MPC · JPL
565023	2017 BG_{12}	—	October 23, 2011	Haleakala	Pan-STARRS 1	HNS · fast	1.2 km	MPC · JPL
565024	2017 BH_{12}	—	October 7, 2007	Gaisberg	Gierlinger, R.	·	1.7 km	MPC · JPL
565025	2017 BK_{14}	—	November 30, 2008	Kitt Peak	Spacewatch	·	1.0 km	MPC · JPL
565026	2017 BU_{14}	—	April 21, 2014	Mount Lemmon	Mount Lemmon Survey	·	940 m	MPC · JPL
565027	2017 BW_{14}	—	January 17, 2007	Kitt Peak	Spacewatch	·	680 m	MPC · JPL
565028	2017 BK_{16}	—	January 23, 2006	Kitt Peak	Spacewatch	MAS	560 m	MPC · JPL
565029	2017 BO_{16}	—	October 21, 2012	Haleakala	Pan-STARRS 1	(1338) (FLO)	660 m	MPC · JPL
565030	2017 BS_{16}	—	October 7, 2012	Haleakala	Pan-STARRS 1	·	650 m	MPC · JPL
565031	2017 BT_{16}	—	December 2, 2005	Kitt Peak	Spacewatch	·	1.0 km	MPC · JPL
565032	2017 BU_{16}	—	February 17, 2010	Kitt Peak	Spacewatch	·	740 m	MPC · JPL
565033	2017 BV_{16}	—	October 1, 2005	Kitt Peak	Spacewatch	·	550 m	MPC · JPL
565034	2017 BC_{17}	—	September 27, 2008	Mount Lemmon	Mount Lemmon Survey	NYS	1.2 km	MPC · JPL
565035	2017 BG_{17}	—	February 19, 2010	Mount Lemmon	Mount Lemmon Survey	·	800 m	MPC · JPL
565036	2017 BN_{17}	—	March 14, 2002	Cima Ekar	ADAS	V	710 m	MPC · JPL
565037	2017 BY_{17}	—	December 5, 2012	Mount Lemmon	Mount Lemmon Survey	·	790 m	MPC · JPL
565038	2017 BE_{19}	—	June 1, 2008	Mount Lemmon	Mount Lemmon Survey	PHO	1.1 km	MPC · JPL
565039 Meganengel	2017 BK_{19}	Meganengel	December 15, 2004	Mauna Kea	P. A. Wiegert, D. D. Balam	MAS	630 m	MPC · JPL
565040	2017 BL_{19}	—	April 20, 2010	Mount Lemmon	Mount Lemmon Survey	·	1.1 km	MPC · JPL
565041	2017 BC_{24}	—	November 10, 2009	Mount Lemmon	Mount Lemmon Survey	·	620 m	MPC · JPL
565042	2017 BL_{24}	—	December 18, 2009	Mount Lemmon	Mount Lemmon Survey	·	610 m	MPC · JPL
565043	2017 BC_{27}	—	March 12, 1996	Kitt Peak	Spacewatch	·	810 m	MPC · JPL
565044	2017 BS_{27}	—	January 22, 2013	Mount Lemmon	Mount Lemmon Survey	·	950 m	MPC · JPL
565045	2017 BV_{30}	—	August 17, 2007	XuYi	PMO NEO Survey Program	·	1.6 km	MPC · JPL
565046	2017 BF_{33}	—	February 5, 2013	ASC-Kislovodsk	ASC-Kislovodsk	·	1.2 km	MPC · JPL
565047	2017 BH_{33}	—	January 10, 2006	Mount Lemmon	Mount Lemmon Survey	·	1.4 km	MPC · JPL
565048	2017 BJ_{33}	—	January 30, 2006	Kitt Peak	Spacewatch	·	1.0 km	MPC · JPL
565049	2017 BU_{33}	—	January 10, 2014	Haleakala	Pan-STARRS 1	·	930 m	MPC · JPL
565050	2017 BL_{34}	—	March 10, 2005	Mount Lemmon	Mount Lemmon Survey	L5	10 km	MPC · JPL
565051	2017 BX_{34}	—	February 9, 2005	Anderson Mesa	LONEOS	·	1.5 km	MPC · JPL
565052	2017 BA_{35}	—	December 25, 2009	Kitt Peak	Spacewatch	·	860 m	MPC · JPL
565053	2017 BM_{35}	—	March 19, 2007	Mount Lemmon	Mount Lemmon Survey	·	1.1 km	MPC · JPL
565054	2017 BN_{35}	—	August 10, 2007	Kitt Peak	Spacewatch	·	1.2 km	MPC · JPL
565055	2017 BO_{35}	—	August 30, 2005	Kitt Peak	Spacewatch	·	910 m	MPC · JPL
565056	2017 BN_{36}	—	September 22, 2012	Mount Lemmon	Mount Lemmon Survey	·	570 m	MPC · JPL
565057	2017 BO_{36}	—	July 22, 2004	Mauna Kea	Veillet, C.	·	1.0 km	MPC · JPL
565058	2017 BT_{36}	—	January 20, 2008	Mount Lemmon	Mount Lemmon Survey	·	1.7 km	MPC · JPL
565059	2017 BZ_{36}	—	February 22, 2009	Catalina	CSS	·	1.5 km	MPC · JPL
565060	2017 BD_{37}	—	February 16, 2004	Kitt Peak	Spacewatch	·	730 m	MPC · JPL
565061	2017 BS_{37}	—	February 13, 2010	Mount Lemmon	Mount Lemmon Survey	·	890 m	MPC · JPL
565062	2017 BW_{37}	—	January 21, 2017	XuYi	PMO NEO Survey Program	PHO	890 m	MPC · JPL
565063	2017 BX_{39}	—	August 23, 2007	Kitt Peak	Spacewatch	V	700 m	MPC · JPL
565064	2017 BA_{40}	—	January 8, 2017	Mount Lemmon	Mount Lemmon Survey	·	730 m	MPC · JPL
565065	2017 BM_{40}	—	February 13, 2002	Kitt Peak	Spacewatch	NYS	900 m	MPC · JPL
565066	2017 BN_{41}	—	January 28, 2006	Kitt Peak	Spacewatch	·	800 m	MPC · JPL
565067	2017 BY_{41}	—	May 6, 2014	Haleakala	Pan-STARRS 1	·	1.0 km	MPC · JPL
565068	2017 BC_{42}	—	December 24, 2006	Mount Lemmon	Mount Lemmon Survey	·	690 m	MPC · JPL
565069	2017 BZ_{42}	—	August 30, 2005	Kitt Peak	Spacewatch	·	690 m	MPC · JPL
565070	2017 BM_{44}	—	January 23, 2006	Kitt Peak	Spacewatch	·	1.0 km	MPC · JPL
565071	2017 BP_{44}	—	March 27, 2003	Kitt Peak	Spacewatch	NYS	850 m	MPC · JPL
565072	2017 BA_{45}	—	March 19, 1996	Kitt Peak	Spacewatch	·	770 m	MPC · JPL
565073	2017 BS_{46}	—	August 28, 2005	Kitt Peak	Spacewatch	·	770 m	MPC · JPL
565074	2017 BU_{46}	—	February 24, 1998	Kitt Peak	Spacewatch	·	1.2 km	MPC · JPL
565075	2017 BJ_{47}	—	January 26, 2017	Mount Lemmon	Mount Lemmon Survey	·	1.5 km	MPC · JPL
565076	2017 BM_{47}	—	February 1, 2006	Kitt Peak	Spacewatch	V	740 m	MPC · JPL
565077	2017 BO_{47}	—	April 7, 2014	Mount Lemmon	Mount Lemmon Survey	·	630 m	MPC · JPL
565078	2017 BR_{47}	—	December 1, 2005	Kitt Peak	L. H. Wasserman, R. L. Millis	·	900 m	MPC · JPL
565079	2017 BU_{47}	—	February 20, 2006	Mount Lemmon	Mount Lemmon Survey	·	1.1 km	MPC · JPL
565080	2017 BQ_{48}	—	November 29, 2005	Mount Lemmon	Mount Lemmon Survey	PHO	870 m	MPC · JPL
565081	2017 BE_{49}	—	November 7, 2012	Haleakala	Pan-STARRS 1	·	760 m	MPC · JPL
565082	2017 BG_{49}	—	October 17, 2012	Haleakala	Pan-STARRS 1	·	530 m	MPC · JPL
565083	2017 BM_{49}	—	July 4, 2005	Mount Lemmon	Mount Lemmon Survey	·	580 m	MPC · JPL
565084	2017 BC_{50}	—	February 7, 2006	Kitt Peak	Spacewatch	·	1.0 km	MPC · JPL
565085	2017 BM_{50}	—	February 16, 2010	Kitt Peak	Spacewatch	·	560 m	MPC · JPL
565086	2017 BR_{51}	—	December 29, 2005	Kitt Peak	Spacewatch	NYS	830 m	MPC · JPL
565087	2017 BT_{51}	—	February 7, 2013	Catalina	CSS	HNS	1.3 km	MPC · JPL
565088	2017 BX_{52}	—	May 21, 2011	Haleakala	Pan-STARRS 1	·	870 m	MPC · JPL
565089	2017 BD_{53}	—	December 6, 2008	Kitt Peak	Spacewatch	·	1.2 km	MPC · JPL
565090	2017 BA_{54}	—	August 14, 2015	Haleakala	Pan-STARRS 1	·	700 m	MPC · JPL
565091	2017 BP_{54}	—	February 27, 2006	Mount Lemmon	Mount Lemmon Survey	·	920 m	MPC · JPL
565092	2017 BA_{55}	—	March 11, 2003	Palomar	NEAT	·	940 m	MPC · JPL
565093	2017 BF_{56}	—	October 23, 2004	Kitt Peak	Spacewatch	·	1.6 km	MPC · JPL
565094	2017 BU_{57}	—	March 13, 2010	Mount Lemmon	Mount Lemmon Survey	·	800 m	MPC · JPL
565095	2017 BY_{57}	—	February 23, 2007	Kitt Peak	Spacewatch	·	680 m	MPC · JPL
565096	2017 BQ_{58}	—	November 21, 2009	Mount Lemmon	Mount Lemmon Survey	·	910 m	MPC · JPL
565097	2017 BJ_{59}	—	August 11, 2001	Haleakala	NEAT	·	870 m	MPC · JPL
565098	2017 BL_{59}	—	May 6, 2006	Mount Lemmon	Mount Lemmon Survey	·	1.3 km	MPC · JPL
565099	2017 BB_{62}	—	December 3, 2002	Palomar	NEAT	·	780 m	MPC · JPL
565100	2017 BM_{62}	—	February 17, 2010	Kitt Peak	Spacewatch	·	930 m	MPC · JPL

== 565101–565200 ==
back to top

Designation			Discovery			Properties		Ref
Permanent	Provisional	Named after	Date	Site	Discoverer(s)	Category	Diam.	Ref
565101	2017 BT_{62}	—	October 2, 2008	Kitt Peak	Spacewatch	·	1.1 km	MPC · JPL
565102	2017 BX_{62}	—	January 7, 2010	Kitt Peak	Spacewatch	·	800 m	MPC · JPL
565103	2017 BD_{63}	—	November 10, 2004	Kitt Peak	Spacewatch	·	1.4 km	MPC · JPL
565104	2017 BM_{63}	—	August 14, 2012	Haleakala	Pan-STARRS 1	·	630 m	MPC · JPL
565105	2017 BU_{63}	—	November 6, 2005	Mount Lemmon	Mount Lemmon Survey	V	620 m	MPC · JPL
565106	2017 BG_{64}	—	December 8, 2012	Kitt Peak	Spacewatch	·	1.2 km	MPC · JPL
565107	2017 BN_{64}	—	September 24, 2008	Kitt Peak	Spacewatch	V	590 m	MPC · JPL
565108	2017 BS_{64}	—	January 12, 2010	Catalina	CSS	·	690 m	MPC · JPL
565109	2017 BD_{65}	—	November 7, 2012	Kitt Peak	Spacewatch	·	990 m	MPC · JPL
565110	2017 BU_{65}	—	March 20, 2010	Kitt Peak	Spacewatch	·	790 m	MPC · JPL
565111	2017 BD_{67}	—	August 25, 2005	Palomar	NEAT	·	680 m	MPC · JPL
565112	2017 BH_{67}	—	January 31, 2006	Kitt Peak	Spacewatch	·	940 m	MPC · JPL
565113	2017 BG_{68}	—	March 20, 2002	Kitt Peak	Spacewatch	·	1.0 km	MPC · JPL
565114	2017 BW_{68}	—	March 15, 2007	Mount Lemmon	Mount Lemmon Survey	·	810 m	MPC · JPL
565115	2017 BB_{69}	—	August 21, 2015	Haleakala	Pan-STARRS 1	·	1.0 km	MPC · JPL
565116	2017 BC_{69}	—	May 6, 2006	Mount Lemmon	Mount Lemmon Survey	MAS	800 m	MPC · JPL
565117	2017 BW_{70}	—	April 22, 2007	Kitt Peak	Spacewatch	·	640 m	MPC · JPL
565118	2017 BC_{74}	—	June 22, 2015	Haleakala	Pan-STARRS 1	·	550 m	MPC · JPL
565119	2017 BG_{76}	—	March 16, 2007	Kitt Peak	Spacewatch	·	610 m	MPC · JPL
565120	2017 BD_{78}	—	October 8, 2008	Mount Lemmon	Mount Lemmon Survey	·	880 m	MPC · JPL
565121	2017 BH_{79}	—	June 25, 2015	Haleakala	Pan-STARRS 1	(883)	570 m	MPC · JPL
565122 Markbowman	2017 BC_{82}	Markbowman	July 25, 2011	Haleakala	Pan-STARRS 1	·	710 m	MPC · JPL
565123	2017 BE_{82}	—	January 29, 2003	Kitt Peak	Spacewatch	V	470 m	MPC · JPL
565124	2017 BP_{82}	—	January 31, 2006	Mount Lemmon	Mount Lemmon Survey	MAS	750 m	MPC · JPL
565125	2017 BV_{82}	—	December 8, 2015	Haleakala	Pan-STARRS 1	HNS	1.3 km	MPC · JPL
565126	2017 BW_{82}	—	July 8, 2014	Haleakala	Pan-STARRS 1	·	1.3 km	MPC · JPL
565127	2017 BB_{83}	—	February 24, 2006	Catalina	CSS	·	1.3 km	MPC · JPL
565128	2017 BH_{83}	—	February 27, 2006	Mount Lemmon	Mount Lemmon Survey	·	950 m	MPC · JPL
565129	2017 BL_{83}	—	September 1, 2005	Palomar	NEAT	·	810 m	MPC · JPL
565130	2017 BP_{83}	—	April 9, 2006	Mount Lemmon	Mount Lemmon Survey	·	1.3 km	MPC · JPL
565131	2017 BQ_{83}	—	May 1, 2003	Kitt Peak	Spacewatch	NYS	1.0 km	MPC · JPL
565132	2017 BE_{86}	—	October 31, 2005	Mount Lemmon	Mount Lemmon Survey	·	960 m	MPC · JPL
565133	2017 BL_{86}	—	January 12, 2013	Mount Lemmon	Mount Lemmon Survey	NYS	1.2 km	MPC · JPL
565134	2017 BM_{86}	—	November 21, 2009	Catalina	CSS	·	810 m	MPC · JPL
565135	2017 BZ_{86}	—	February 7, 2013	Nogales	M. Schwartz, P. R. Holvorcem	·	1.4 km	MPC · JPL
565136	2017 BD_{90}	—	April 2, 2014	Mount Lemmon	Mount Lemmon Survey	·	640 m	MPC · JPL
565137	2017 BF_{94}	—	January 11, 2010	Kitt Peak	Spacewatch	·	750 m	MPC · JPL
565138	2017 BS_{94}	—	January 4, 2006	Kitt Peak	Spacewatch	MAS	490 m	MPC · JPL
565139 Sumshchyna	2017 BB_{95}	Sumshchyna	December 1, 2005	Mount Lemmon	Mount Lemmon Survey	·	680 m	MPC · JPL
565140	2017 BA_{97}	—	November 24, 2014	Haleakala	Pan-STARRS 1	L5	10 km	MPC · JPL
565141	2017 BL_{97}	—	January 22, 2002	Kitt Peak	Spacewatch	·	800 m	MPC · JPL
565142	2017 BO_{97}	—	December 25, 2005	Kitt Peak	Spacewatch	·	1.0 km	MPC · JPL
565143	2017 BT_{97}	—	December 20, 2004	Mount Lemmon	Mount Lemmon Survey	L5	10 km	MPC · JPL
565144	2017 BD_{98}	—	April 23, 2007	Kitt Peak	Spacewatch	·	750 m	MPC · JPL
565145	2017 BG_{98}	—	August 21, 2015	Haleakala	Pan-STARRS 1	·	820 m	MPC · JPL
565146	2017 BY_{98}	—	March 24, 2014	Haleakala	Pan-STARRS 1	V	490 m	MPC · JPL
565147	2017 BB_{99}	—	October 2, 2014	Haleakala	Pan-STARRS 1	L5	8.2 km	MPC · JPL
565148	2017 BT_{99}	—	January 6, 2010	Kitt Peak	Spacewatch	·	640 m	MPC · JPL
565149	2017 BL_{100}	—	March 24, 2014	Haleakala	Pan-STARRS 1	·	580 m	MPC · JPL
565150	2017 BX_{100}	—	September 18, 2012	Kitt Peak	Spacewatch	·	600 m	MPC · JPL
565151	2017 BG_{101}	—	January 4, 2013	Kitt Peak	Spacewatch	NYS	1.3 km	MPC · JPL
565152	2017 BL_{101}	—	March 25, 2003	Palomar	NEAT	V	700 m	MPC · JPL
565153	2017 BU_{102}	—	December 19, 2007	Kitt Peak	Spacewatch	HNS	1.3 km	MPC · JPL
565154	2017 BT_{103}	—	October 4, 2003	Kitt Peak	Spacewatch	·	1.4 km	MPC · JPL
565155	2017 BV_{106}	—	August 30, 2005	Kitt Peak	Spacewatch	·	540 m	MPC · JPL
565156	2017 BT_{110}	—	November 3, 2011	Mount Lemmon	Mount Lemmon Survey	·	1.4 km	MPC · JPL
565157	2017 BY_{110}	—	September 29, 2008	Mount Lemmon	Mount Lemmon Survey	·	950 m	MPC · JPL
565158	2017 BV_{111}	—	February 11, 2014	Mount Lemmon	Mount Lemmon Survey	·	660 m	MPC · JPL
565159	2017 BT_{112}	—	January 4, 2017	Haleakala	Pan-STARRS 1	PHO	670 m	MPC · JPL
565160	2017 BZ_{112}	—	October 8, 2007	Catalina	CSS	·	1.6 km	MPC · JPL
565161	2017 BO_{113}	—	November 15, 2007	Mount Lemmon	Mount Lemmon Survey	·	1.5 km	MPC · JPL
565162	2017 BF_{114}	—	March 19, 2001	Apache Point	SDSS Collaboration	·	770 m	MPC · JPL
565163	2017 BV_{115}	—	October 29, 2008	Catalina	CSS	·	1.2 km	MPC · JPL
565164	2017 BC_{117}	—	December 7, 2016	Mount Lemmon	Mount Lemmon Survey	·	1.6 km	MPC · JPL
565165	2017 BP_{117}	—	November 29, 2005	Mount Lemmon	Mount Lemmon Survey	·	970 m	MPC · JPL
565166	2017 BD_{118}	—	February 16, 2004	Kitt Peak	Spacewatch	·	1.9 km	MPC · JPL
565167	2017 BY_{118}	—	January 16, 2013	Haleakala	Pan-STARRS 1	·	960 m	MPC · JPL
565168	2017 BY_{119}	—	October 1, 2005	Mount Lemmon	Mount Lemmon Survey	·	630 m	MPC · JPL
565169	2017 BS_{121}	—	December 10, 2012	Mount Lemmon	Mount Lemmon Survey	·	1.0 km	MPC · JPL
565170	2017 BF_{122}	—	October 8, 2012	Haleakala	Pan-STARRS 1	·	670 m	MPC · JPL
565171	2017 BV_{122}	—	August 28, 2005	Kitt Peak	Spacewatch	·	630 m	MPC · JPL
565172	2017 BA_{123}	—	February 25, 2012	Kitt Peak	Spacewatch	·	1.9 km	MPC · JPL
565173	2017 BQ_{123}	—	October 17, 2012	Mount Lemmon	Mount Lemmon Survey	V	580 m	MPC · JPL
565174	2017 BT_{123}	—	October 29, 2008	Kitt Peak	Spacewatch	·	980 m	MPC · JPL
565175	2017 BZ_{124}	—	April 9, 2010	Kitt Peak	Spacewatch	·	1.2 km	MPC · JPL
565176	2017 BT_{125}	—	November 20, 2008	Mount Lemmon	Mount Lemmon Survey	·	1.1 km	MPC · JPL
565177	2017 BV_{125}	—	October 22, 2012	Haleakala	Pan-STARRS 1	V	540 m	MPC · JPL
565178	2017 BX_{125}	—	March 19, 2007	Mount Lemmon	Mount Lemmon Survey	·	620 m	MPC · JPL
565179	2017 BR_{126}	—	April 20, 2010	Kitt Peak	Spacewatch	NYS	1.1 km	MPC · JPL
565180	2017 BY_{126}	—	October 15, 2012	Haleakala	Pan-STARRS 1	·	490 m	MPC · JPL
565181	2017 BH_{127}	—	February 17, 2010	Kitt Peak	Spacewatch	·	830 m	MPC · JPL
565182	2017 BK_{127}	—	December 29, 2005	Kitt Peak	Spacewatch	·	950 m	MPC · JPL
565183	2017 BR_{127}	—	September 15, 2012	Catalina	CSS	·	660 m	MPC · JPL
565184 Janusz	2017 BK_{129}	Janusz	February 22, 2012	Mount Graham	K. Černis, R. P. Boyle	URS	2.9 km	MPC · JPL
565185	2017 BG_{131}	—	October 22, 2005	Kitt Peak	Spacewatch	·	670 m	MPC · JPL
565186	2017 BL_{131}	—	November 7, 2012	Haleakala	Pan-STARRS 1	·	780 m	MPC · JPL
565187	2017 BW_{132}	—	March 23, 2006	Kitt Peak	Spacewatch	NYS	950 m	MPC · JPL
565188	2017 BQ_{136}	—	January 16, 1996	Kitt Peak	Spacewatch	·	1.8 km	MPC · JPL
565189	2017 BR_{136}	—	April 30, 2014	Haleakala	Pan-STARRS 1	V	650 m	MPC · JPL
565190	2017 BX_{137}	—	February 8, 2013	Haleakala	Pan-STARRS 1	·	990 m	MPC · JPL
565191	2017 BV_{138}	—	February 18, 2013	Kitt Peak	Spacewatch	·	1.1 km	MPC · JPL
565192	2017 BB_{140}	—	September 14, 2006	Kitt Peak	Spacewatch	·	1.6 km	MPC · JPL
565193	2017 BF_{140}	—	February 9, 2008	Kitt Peak	Spacewatch	·	1.5 km	MPC · JPL
565194	2017 BG_{140}	—	November 24, 2011	Haleakala	Pan-STARRS 1	MAR	790 m	MPC · JPL
565195	2017 BB_{155}	—	January 27, 2017	Haleakala	Pan-STARRS 1	L5	7.1 km	MPC · JPL
565196	2017 BN_{156}	—	January 29, 2017	Haleakala	Pan-STARRS 1	L5	8.2 km	MPC · JPL
565197	2017 BM_{159}	—	January 28, 2017	Haleakala	Pan-STARRS 1	L5	8.6 km	MPC · JPL
565198	2017 BS_{160}	—	January 27, 2017	Haleakala	Pan-STARRS 1	V	430 m	MPC · JPL
565199	2017 BU_{161}	—	December 14, 2007	Mount Lemmon	Mount Lemmon Survey	·	1.2 km	MPC · JPL
565200	2017 BP_{163}	—	December 1, 2008	Kitt Peak	Spacewatch	NYS	940 m	MPC · JPL

== 565201–565300 ==
back to top

Designation			Discovery			Properties		Ref
Permanent	Provisional	Named after	Date	Site	Discoverer(s)	Category	Diam.	Ref
565201	2017 CD_{2}	—	October 20, 2012	Mount Lemmon	Mount Lemmon Survey	·	1.1 km	MPC · JPL
565202	2017 CE_{2}	—	November 10, 2009	Kitt Peak	Spacewatch	·	660 m	MPC · JPL
565203	2017 CH_{2}	—	October 18, 2012	Haleakala	Pan-STARRS 1	·	820 m	MPC · JPL
565204	2017 CZ_{2}	—	November 12, 2012	Haleakala	Pan-STARRS 1	·	1.0 km	MPC · JPL
565205	2017 CC_{3}	—	October 22, 2012	Haleakala	Pan-STARRS 1	·	890 m	MPC · JPL
565206	2017 CJ_{3}	—	May 7, 2014	Haleakala	Pan-STARRS 1	·	780 m	MPC · JPL
565207	2017 CH_{4}	—	August 26, 2014	Haleakala	Pan-STARRS 1	EUN	1.0 km	MPC · JPL
565208	2017 CJ_{4}	—	January 7, 2010	Kitt Peak	Spacewatch	V	490 m	MPC · JPL
565209	2017 CL_{4}	—	May 5, 2006	Kitt Peak	Spacewatch	·	1.3 km	MPC · JPL
565210	2017 CM_{4}	—	November 6, 2008	Kitt Peak	Spacewatch	·	1.2 km	MPC · JPL
565211	2017 CB_{6}	—	April 30, 2014	Haleakala	Pan-STARRS 1	·	720 m	MPC · JPL
565212	2017 CB_{8}	—	August 6, 2011	Haleakala	Pan-STARRS 1	·	990 m	MPC · JPL
565213	2017 CT_{9}	—	August 28, 2005	Kitt Peak	Spacewatch	·	870 m	MPC · JPL
565214	2017 CY_{9}	—	February 27, 2006	Kitt Peak	Spacewatch	MAS	610 m	MPC · JPL
565215	2017 CQ_{10}	—	December 26, 2005	Kitt Peak	Spacewatch	MAS	530 m	MPC · JPL
565216	2017 CT_{10}	—	January 19, 1996	Kitt Peak	Spacewatch	·	540 m	MPC · JPL
565217	2017 CY_{10}	—	January 16, 2008	Mount Lemmon	Mount Lemmon Survey	·	1.3 km	MPC · JPL
565218	2017 CB_{11}	—	July 28, 2015	Haleakala	Pan-STARRS 1	PHO	860 m	MPC · JPL
565219	2017 CC_{11}	—	January 20, 2013	Kitt Peak	Spacewatch	·	1.0 km	MPC · JPL
565220	2017 CD_{11}	—	October 3, 2015	Mount Lemmon	Mount Lemmon Survey	RAF	800 m	MPC · JPL
565221	2017 CE_{11}	—	April 9, 2013	Haleakala	Pan-STARRS 1	·	1.4 km	MPC · JPL
565222	2017 CK_{11}	—	March 25, 2014	Kitt Peak	Spacewatch	·	1.0 km	MPC · JPL
565223	2017 CD_{12}	—	November 21, 2008	Kitt Peak	Spacewatch	·	1.3 km	MPC · JPL
565224	2017 CD_{13}	—	December 6, 2005	Kitt Peak	Spacewatch	·	1.1 km	MPC · JPL
565225	2017 CB_{14}	—	September 20, 2011	Haleakala	Pan-STARRS 1	CLA	1.3 km	MPC · JPL
565226	2017 CV_{14}	—	February 17, 2010	Mount Lemmon	Mount Lemmon Survey	·	540 m	MPC · JPL
565227	2017 CP_{17}	—	September 20, 1995	Kitt Peak	Spacewatch	·	570 m	MPC · JPL
565228	2017 CZ_{17}	—	February 15, 2012	Haleakala	Pan-STARRS 1	·	2.4 km	MPC · JPL
565229	2017 CL_{18}	—	November 17, 1995	Kitt Peak	Spacewatch	·	530 m	MPC · JPL
565230	2017 CE_{19}	—	January 30, 2006	Kitt Peak	Spacewatch	·	740 m	MPC · JPL
565231	2017 CC_{20}	—	January 30, 2006	Kitt Peak	Spacewatch	MAS	580 m	MPC · JPL
565232	2017 CW_{20}	—	November 22, 2012	Catalina	CSS	·	840 m	MPC · JPL
565233	2017 CY_{23}	—	January 31, 2006	Kitt Peak	Spacewatch	V	550 m	MPC · JPL
565234	2017 CE_{25}	—	February 26, 2014	Haleakala	Pan-STARRS 1	(2076)	880 m	MPC · JPL
565235	2017 CK_{27}	—	June 12, 2011	Mount Lemmon	Mount Lemmon Survey	·	640 m	MPC · JPL
565236	2017 CO_{27}	—	April 23, 2014	Cerro Tololo-DECam	DECam	·	560 m	MPC · JPL
565237	2017 CX_{28}	—	March 23, 2003	Apache Point	SDSS Collaboration	·	1.2 km	MPC · JPL
565238	2017 CZ_{28}	—	May 9, 2014	Mount Lemmon	Mount Lemmon Survey	·	750 m	MPC · JPL
565239	2017 CC_{29}	—	March 23, 2003	Kitt Peak	Spacewatch	·	890 m	MPC · JPL
565240	2017 CE_{30}	—	January 11, 2010	Kitt Peak	Spacewatch	·	700 m	MPC · JPL
565241	2017 CB_{31}	—	April 5, 2014	Haleakala	Pan-STARRS 1	·	620 m	MPC · JPL
565242	2017 CM_{31}	—	October 17, 2012	Haleakala	Pan-STARRS 1	·	540 m	MPC · JPL
565243	2017 CT_{31}	—	February 22, 2009	Catalina	CSS	H	530 m	MPC · JPL
565244	2017 CC_{32}	—	January 17, 2004	Palomar	NEAT	·	1.7 km	MPC · JPL
565245	2017 CR_{33}	—	November 21, 2005	Kitt Peak	Spacewatch	·	880 m	MPC · JPL
565246	2017 CA_{34}	—	September 11, 2015	Haleakala	Pan-STARRS 1	·	1.2 km	MPC · JPL
565247	2017 CV_{34}	—	April 8, 2013	Kitt Peak	Spacewatch	ADE	1.6 km	MPC · JPL
565248	2017 CA_{35}	—	February 15, 2004	Palomar	NEAT	·	1.2 km	MPC · JPL
565249	2017 CB_{35}	—	January 22, 2004	Palomar	NEAT	·	1.5 km	MPC · JPL
565250	2017 CL_{35}	—	November 22, 2015	Mount Lemmon	Mount Lemmon Survey	·	1.0 km	MPC · JPL
565251	2017 CP_{35}	—	December 18, 2007	Bergisch Gladbach	W. Bickel	·	1.3 km	MPC · JPL
565252	2017 CA_{40}	—	February 10, 2017	Haleakala	Pan-STARRS 1	PHO	1.0 km	MPC · JPL
565253	2017 CC_{43}	—	February 4, 2017	Haleakala	Pan-STARRS 1	EUN	850 m	MPC · JPL
565254	2017 DR	—	February 5, 2013	Kitt Peak	Spacewatch	·	1.3 km	MPC · JPL
565255	2017 DS	—	March 12, 2002	Palomar	NEAT	·	1.1 km	MPC · JPL
565256	2017 DT	—	April 2, 2006	Kitt Peak	Spacewatch	NYS	910 m	MPC · JPL
565257	2017 DF_{1}	—	October 13, 2005	Kitt Peak	Spacewatch	·	570 m	MPC · JPL
565258	2017 DG_{1}	—	December 30, 2005	Kitt Peak	Spacewatch	·	1.2 km	MPC · JPL
565259	2017 DV_{1}	—	November 18, 2008	Kitt Peak	Spacewatch	MAS	470 m	MPC · JPL
565260	2017 DO_{2}	—	April 6, 2010	Kitt Peak	Spacewatch	·	1.4 km	MPC · JPL
565261	2017 DQ_{2}	—	November 8, 2008	Kitt Peak	Spacewatch	MAS	610 m	MPC · JPL
565262	2017 DS_{2}	—	August 29, 2005	Kitt Peak	Spacewatch	·	710 m	MPC · JPL
565263	2017 DV_{2}	—	September 24, 2008	Kitt Peak	Spacewatch	MAS	570 m	MPC · JPL
565264	2017 DT_{3}	—	March 2, 2006	Kitt Peak	Spacewatch	·	840 m	MPC · JPL
565265	2017 DZ_{3}	—	March 2, 2006	Kitt Peak	Spacewatch	·	1.3 km	MPC · JPL
565266	2017 DC_{4}	—	April 30, 2014	Haleakala	Pan-STARRS 1	·	1.1 km	MPC · JPL
565267	2017 DV_{4}	—	March 11, 2007	Kitt Peak	Spacewatch	·	700 m	MPC · JPL
565268	2017 DD_{5}	—	March 13, 2010	Kitt Peak	Spacewatch	NYS	610 m	MPC · JPL
565269	2017 DM_{6}	—	January 8, 2010	Kitt Peak	Spacewatch	·	650 m	MPC · JPL
565270	2017 DR_{6}	—	September 14, 2013	Haleakala	Pan-STARRS 1	L5	10 km	MPC · JPL
565271	2017 DU_{6}	—	November 2, 2008	Mount Lemmon	Mount Lemmon Survey	·	1.1 km	MPC · JPL
565272	2017 DC_{7}	—	November 21, 2008	Kitt Peak	Spacewatch	V	660 m	MPC · JPL
565273	2017 DK_{7}	—	August 7, 2008	Kitt Peak	Spacewatch	PHO	1.0 km	MPC · JPL
565274	2017 DM_{7}	—	March 18, 2004	Palomar	NEAT	·	2.1 km	MPC · JPL
565275	2017 DP_{7}	—	December 29, 2008	Mount Lemmon	Mount Lemmon Survey	EUN	900 m	MPC · JPL
565276	2017 DT_{8}	—	January 31, 2006	Catalina	CSS	·	1.1 km	MPC · JPL
565277	2017 DW_{8}	—	October 8, 2004	Kitt Peak	Spacewatch	·	1.4 km	MPC · JPL
565278	2017 DZ_{8}	—	February 17, 2013	Mount Lemmon	Mount Lemmon Survey	·	1.7 km	MPC · JPL
565279	2017 DB_{9}	—	November 4, 2004	Kitt Peak	Spacewatch	MAS	780 m	MPC · JPL
565280	2017 DC_{9}	—	July 25, 2014	Haleakala	Pan-STARRS 1	·	1.3 km	MPC · JPL
565281	2017 DT_{9}	—	January 1, 1998	Kitt Peak	Spacewatch	NYS	1.1 km	MPC · JPL
565282	2017 DU_{9}	—	February 1, 2006	Mount Lemmon	Mount Lemmon Survey	·	1.2 km	MPC · JPL
565283	2017 DX_{9}	—	January 22, 2006	Mount Lemmon	Mount Lemmon Survey	MAS	450 m	MPC · JPL
565284	2017 DE_{10}	—	February 1, 2006	Mount Lemmon	Mount Lemmon Survey	·	760 m	MPC · JPL
565285	2017 DV_{10}	—	January 7, 2006	Kitt Peak	Spacewatch	NYS	760 m	MPC · JPL
565286	2017 DZ_{10}	—	October 18, 2012	Haleakala	Pan-STARRS 1	·	530 m	MPC · JPL
565287	2017 DF_{11}	—	September 24, 2008	Kitt Peak	Spacewatch	V	720 m	MPC · JPL
565288	2017 DP_{11}	—	October 7, 2008	Mount Lemmon	Mount Lemmon Survey	ERI	1.4 km	MPC · JPL
565289	2017 DT_{11}	—	February 13, 2013	ESA OGS	ESA OGS	·	1.3 km	MPC · JPL
565290	2017 DA_{12}	—	October 24, 2011	Kitt Peak	Spacewatch	·	1.1 km	MPC · JPL
565291	2017 DO_{12}	—	April 4, 2014	Kitt Peak	Spacewatch	·	1.5 km	MPC · JPL
565292	2017 DQ_{12}	—	January 31, 2017	Haleakala	Pan-STARRS 1	HNS	850 m	MPC · JPL
565293	2017 DK_{13}	—	September 24, 2011	Haleakala	Pan-STARRS 1	·	1.1 km	MPC · JPL
565294	2017 DB_{14}	—	March 14, 2010	Mount Lemmon	Mount Lemmon Survey	·	970 m	MPC · JPL
565295	2017 DD_{14}	—	March 19, 2010	Mount Lemmon	Mount Lemmon Survey	V	680 m	MPC · JPL
565296	2017 DL_{14}	—	September 4, 2011	Haleakala	Pan-STARRS 1	·	1.1 km	MPC · JPL
565297	2017 DM_{14}	—	September 3, 2008	Kitt Peak	Spacewatch	·	1.1 km	MPC · JPL
565298	2017 DY_{17}	—	December 13, 2012	Mount Lemmon	Mount Lemmon Survey	V	520 m	MPC · JPL
565299	2017 DH_{18}	—	January 15, 2007	Kitt Peak	Spacewatch	·	620 m	MPC · JPL
565300	2017 DZ_{18}	—	November 18, 2003	Kitt Peak	Spacewatch	·	880 m	MPC · JPL

== 565301–565400 ==
back to top

Designation			Discovery			Properties		Ref
Permanent	Provisional	Named after	Date	Site	Discoverer(s)	Category	Diam.	Ref
565301	2017 DH_{19}	—	September 23, 2008	Kitt Peak	Spacewatch	V	410 m	MPC · JPL
565302	2017 DP_{19}	—	June 9, 2007	Kitt Peak	Spacewatch	·	1.2 km	MPC · JPL
565303	2017 DW_{19}	—	October 19, 2012	Haleakala	Pan-STARRS 1	·	630 m	MPC · JPL
565304	2017 DW_{20}	—	February 1, 2003	Kitt Peak	Spacewatch	·	780 m	MPC · JPL
565305	2017 DP_{22}	—	December 6, 2012	Mount Lemmon	Mount Lemmon Survey	·	620 m	MPC · JPL
565306	2017 DZ_{22}	—	January 3, 2003	Kitt Peak	Spacewatch	·	660 m	MPC · JPL
565307	2017 DQ_{23}	—	October 18, 2012	Haleakala	Pan-STARRS 1	·	560 m	MPC · JPL
565308	2017 DA_{25}	—	September 8, 1996	Kitt Peak	Spacewatch	·	580 m	MPC · JPL
565309	2017 DF_{25}	—	May 21, 2014	Haleakala	Pan-STARRS 1	·	780 m	MPC · JPL
565310	2017 DV_{25}	—	November 7, 2008	Mount Lemmon	Mount Lemmon Survey	·	1.2 km	MPC · JPL
565311	2017 DW_{25}	—	July 28, 2011	Haleakala	Pan-STARRS 1	·	1 km	MPC · JPL
565312	2017 DQ_{28}	—	September 12, 2004	Kitt Peak	Spacewatch	·	890 m	MPC · JPL
565313	2017 DF_{29}	—	October 26, 2008	Kitt Peak	Spacewatch	·	850 m	MPC · JPL
565314	2017 DX_{29}	—	September 23, 2005	Catalina	CSS	·	630 m	MPC · JPL
565315	2017 DN_{30}	—	August 9, 2015	Haleakala	Pan-STARRS 1	·	670 m	MPC · JPL
565316	2017 DP_{30}	—	December 29, 2005	Kitt Peak	Spacewatch	·	830 m	MPC · JPL
565317	2017 DV_{30}	—	May 24, 2010	Kitt Peak	Spacewatch	NYS	1.1 km	MPC · JPL
565318	2017 DP_{31}	—	November 24, 2000	Kitt Peak	Deep Lens Survey	·	1.2 km	MPC · JPL
565319	2017 DQ_{31}	—	February 14, 2010	Mount Lemmon	Mount Lemmon Survey	·	680 m	MPC · JPL
565320	2017 DG_{32}	—	January 26, 2006	Kitt Peak	Spacewatch	·	900 m	MPC · JPL
565321	2017 DR_{32}	—	April 4, 2014	Haleakala	Pan-STARRS 1	·	1.2 km	MPC · JPL
565322	2017 DT_{32}	—	January 17, 2013	Mount Lemmon	Mount Lemmon Survey	MAR	720 m	MPC · JPL
565323	2017 DU_{32}	—	November 19, 2008	Mount Lemmon	Mount Lemmon Survey	·	960 m	MPC · JPL
565324	2017 DJ_{33}	—	August 30, 2011	Haleakala	Pan-STARRS 1	·	1.2 km	MPC · JPL
565325	2017 DK_{33}	—	October 25, 2012	Mount Lemmon	Mount Lemmon Survey	·	640 m	MPC · JPL
565326	2017 DN_{33}	—	February 20, 2002	Kitt Peak	Spacewatch	·	1.1 km	MPC · JPL
565327	2017 DX_{33}	—	March 25, 2007	Mount Lemmon	Mount Lemmon Survey	·	690 m	MPC · JPL
565328	2017 DH_{35}	—	October 22, 2003	Apache Point	SDSS Collaboration	·	1.3 km	MPC · JPL
565329	2017 DH_{36}	—	September 26, 2003	Palomar	NEAT	·	1.4 km	MPC · JPL
565330	2017 DJ_{38}	—	November 18, 2008	Kitt Peak	Spacewatch	·	1.4 km	MPC · JPL
565331	2017 DG_{39}	—	January 10, 2006	Mount Lemmon	Mount Lemmon Survey	MAS	490 m	MPC · JPL
565332	2017 DW_{39}	—	October 20, 2008	Mount Lemmon	Mount Lemmon Survey	NYS	870 m	MPC · JPL
565333	2017 DB_{41}	—	March 15, 2010	Mount Lemmon	Mount Lemmon Survey	V	640 m	MPC · JPL
565334	2017 DE_{42}	—	November 7, 2012	Haleakala	Pan-STARRS 1	·	620 m	MPC · JPL
565335	2017 DU_{42}	—	October 16, 2007	Mount Lemmon	Mount Lemmon Survey	·	1.3 km	MPC · JPL
565336	2017 DW_{42}	—	October 27, 2008	Mount Lemmon	Mount Lemmon Survey	·	1.1 km	MPC · JPL
565337	2017 DJ_{43}	—	February 10, 2010	Kitt Peak	Spacewatch	·	620 m	MPC · JPL
565338	2017 DO_{44}	—	September 26, 2011	Haleakala	Pan-STARRS 1	·	1.1 km	MPC · JPL
565339	2017 DU_{44}	—	September 19, 2007	Kitt Peak	Spacewatch	·	1.3 km	MPC · JPL
565340	2017 DC_{46}	—	May 23, 2014	Haleakala	Pan-STARRS 1	·	750 m	MPC · JPL
565341	2017 DA_{47}	—	October 20, 2008	Mount Lemmon	Mount Lemmon Survey	·	860 m	MPC · JPL
565342	2017 DE_{47}	—	October 29, 2003	Kitt Peak	Spacewatch	·	1.3 km	MPC · JPL
565343	2017 DJ_{47}	—	October 20, 2008	Kitt Peak	Spacewatch	V	650 m	MPC · JPL
565344	2017 DL_{47}	—	December 31, 2008	Mount Lemmon	Mount Lemmon Survey	·	1.3 km	MPC · JPL
565345	2017 DS_{47}	—	November 20, 2000	Kitt Peak	Spacewatch	·	1.1 km	MPC · JPL
565346	2017 DU_{47}	—	February 16, 2010	Mount Lemmon	Mount Lemmon Survey	·	710 m	MPC · JPL
565347	2017 DP_{48}	—	December 11, 2012	Mount Lemmon	Mount Lemmon Survey	V	550 m	MPC · JPL
565348	2017 DW_{49}	—	March 8, 2013	Haleakala	Pan-STARRS 1	·	1.1 km	MPC · JPL
565349	2017 DL_{50}	—	December 22, 2012	Haleakala	Pan-STARRS 1	·	1.4 km	MPC · JPL
565350	2017 DR_{50}	—	April 7, 2003	Kitt Peak	Spacewatch	·	1.1 km	MPC · JPL
565351	2017 DT_{50}	—	March 4, 2006	Mount Lemmon	Mount Lemmon Survey	·	1.1 km	MPC · JPL
565352	2017 DB_{51}	—	March 5, 2013	Haleakala	Pan-STARRS 1	HNS	1.1 km	MPC · JPL
565353	2017 DO_{51}	—	February 21, 2017	Mount Lemmon	Mount Lemmon Survey	V	460 m	MPC · JPL
565354	2017 DC_{52}	—	June 23, 2014	Mount Lemmon	Mount Lemmon Survey	V	550 m	MPC · JPL
565355	2017 DP_{52}	—	November 22, 2014	Haleakala	Pan-STARRS 1	L5	9.1 km	MPC · JPL
565356	2017 DG_{54}	—	January 9, 2006	Kitt Peak	Spacewatch	·	970 m	MPC · JPL
565357	2017 DH_{54}	—	March 29, 2003	Kitt Peak	Spacewatch	·	890 m	MPC · JPL
565358	2017 DW_{54}	—	February 16, 2002	Palomar	NEAT	·	1.2 km	MPC · JPL
565359	2017 DN_{55}	—	March 22, 2006	Catalina	CSS	·	1.2 km	MPC · JPL
565360	2017 DW_{55}	—	April 26, 2007	Kitt Peak	Spacewatch	·	690 m	MPC · JPL
565361	2017 DY_{55}	—	November 20, 2008	Mount Lemmon	Mount Lemmon Survey	·	1.4 km	MPC · JPL
565362	2017 DJ_{58}	—	February 21, 2017	Mount Lemmon	Mount Lemmon Survey	·	770 m	MPC · JPL
565363	2017 DF_{60}	—	December 21, 2008	Mount Lemmon	Mount Lemmon Survey	·	1.3 km	MPC · JPL
565364	2017 DG_{60}	—	March 6, 2013	Haleakala	Pan-STARRS 1	EUN	1.1 km	MPC · JPL
565365	2017 DL_{61}	—	May 15, 2001	Kitt Peak	Spacewatch	·	1.2 km	MPC · JPL
565366	2017 DA_{62}	—	February 2, 2006	Mount Lemmon	Mount Lemmon Survey	·	870 m	MPC · JPL
565367	2017 DC_{62}	—	January 23, 2006	Kitt Peak	Spacewatch	MAS	510 m	MPC · JPL
565368	2017 DM_{62}	—	February 1, 2009	Kitt Peak	Spacewatch	·	1.5 km	MPC · JPL
565369	2017 DS_{62}	—	January 22, 2013	Mount Lemmon	Mount Lemmon Survey	HNS	870 m	MPC · JPL
565370	2017 DS_{63}	—	January 5, 2013	Mount Lemmon	Mount Lemmon Survey	·	1.0 km	MPC · JPL
565371	2017 DJ_{65}	—	June 29, 2014	Haleakala	Pan-STARRS 1	EUN	1.3 km	MPC · JPL
565372	2017 DW_{65}	—	May 19, 2014	Haleakala	Pan-STARRS 1	·	930 m	MPC · JPL
565373	2017 DL_{67}	—	December 14, 2001	Socorro	LINEAR	MAS	580 m	MPC · JPL
565374	2017 DE_{68}	—	October 18, 2003	Apache Point	SDSS Collaboration	V	660 m	MPC · JPL
565375	2017 DR_{68}	—	February 8, 2007	Mount Lemmon	Mount Lemmon Survey	·	610 m	MPC · JPL
565376	2017 DN_{69}	—	January 31, 2006	Mount Lemmon	Mount Lemmon Survey	MAS	630 m	MPC · JPL
565377	2017 DA_{70}	—	June 24, 2014	Haleakala	Pan-STARRS 1	MAR	1.1 km	MPC · JPL
565378	2017 DE_{70}	—	May 24, 2014	Mount Lemmon	Mount Lemmon Survey	V	520 m	MPC · JPL
565379	2017 DA_{71}	—	December 23, 2012	Haleakala	Pan-STARRS 1	·	1.4 km	MPC · JPL
565380	2017 DB_{71}	—	January 21, 2002	Kitt Peak	Spacewatch	NYS	820 m	MPC · JPL
565381	2017 DC_{71}	—	February 25, 2006	Kitt Peak	Spacewatch	·	840 m	MPC · JPL
565382	2017 DH_{71}	—	February 22, 2004	Kitt Peak	Deep Ecliptic Survey	HNS	1.2 km	MPC · JPL
565383	2017 DK_{71}	—	January 23, 2013	Mount Lemmon	Mount Lemmon Survey	NYS	900 m	MPC · JPL
565384	2017 DY_{71}	—	March 18, 2013	Kitt Peak	Spacewatch	·	870 m	MPC · JPL
565385	2017 DA_{72}	—	January 19, 2013	Mount Lemmon	Mount Lemmon Survey	NYS	930 m	MPC · JPL
565386	2017 DB_{72}	—	September 12, 2005	Kitt Peak	Spacewatch	·	2.2 km	MPC · JPL
565387	2017 DP_{72}	—	February 11, 2002	Socorro	LINEAR	NYS	970 m	MPC · JPL
565388	2017 DR_{72}	—	January 4, 2013	Kitt Peak	Spacewatch	NYS	900 m	MPC · JPL
565389	2017 DV_{72}	—	March 12, 2003	Kitt Peak	Spacewatch	·	850 m	MPC · JPL
565390	2017 DZ_{72}	—	April 21, 2006	Catalina	CSS	·	1.0 km	MPC · JPL
565391	2017 DQ_{73}	—	March 4, 2013	Haleakala	Pan-STARRS 1	·	1.2 km	MPC · JPL
565392	2017 DU_{73}	—	February 25, 2006	Kitt Peak	Spacewatch	·	910 m	MPC · JPL
565393	2017 DS_{74}	—	February 10, 2008	Mount Lemmon	Mount Lemmon Survey	·	1.4 km	MPC · JPL
565394	2017 DZ_{74}	—	March 19, 2013	Haleakala	Pan-STARRS 1	EUN	810 m	MPC · JPL
565395	2017 DO_{75}	—	November 24, 2011	Mount Lemmon	Mount Lemmon Survey	·	1.3 km	MPC · JPL
565396	2017 DP_{75}	—	November 13, 2015	Kitt Peak	Spacewatch	·	1.0 km	MPC · JPL
565397	2017 DR_{75}	—	April 3, 2013	Mount Lemmon	Mount Lemmon Survey	·	910 m	MPC · JPL
565398	2017 DG_{76}	—	November 8, 2007	Kitt Peak	Spacewatch	·	1.0 km	MPC · JPL
565399	2017 DJ_{76}	—	April 1, 2013	Mount Lemmon	Mount Lemmon Survey	EUN	960 m	MPC · JPL
565400	2017 DV_{76}	—	February 21, 2017	Haleakala	Pan-STARRS 1	ADE	1.4 km	MPC · JPL

== 565401–565500 ==
back to top

Designation			Discovery			Properties		Ref
Permanent	Provisional	Named after	Date	Site	Discoverer(s)	Category	Diam.	Ref
565401	2017 DW_{76}	—	May 27, 2000	Socorro	LINEAR	·	1.7 km	MPC · JPL
565402	2017 DV_{77}	—	October 23, 2008	Kitt Peak	Spacewatch	·	1.4 km	MPC · JPL
565403	2017 DF_{78}	—	September 19, 2003	Kitt Peak	Spacewatch	·	970 m	MPC · JPL
565404	2017 DN_{78}	—	November 26, 2005	Kitt Peak	Spacewatch	·	880 m	MPC · JPL
565405	2017 DO_{78}	—	July 25, 2015	Haleakala	Pan-STARRS 1	·	1.0 km	MPC · JPL
565406	2017 DY_{78}	—	February 13, 2004	Anderson Mesa	LONEOS	·	2.0 km	MPC · JPL
565407	2017 DB_{79}	—	January 26, 2006	Kitt Peak	Spacewatch	·	980 m	MPC · JPL
565408	2017 DK_{79}	—	October 21, 2011	Mount Lemmon	Mount Lemmon Survey	·	1.5 km	MPC · JPL
565409	2017 DL_{79}	—	April 7, 2010	Mount Lemmon	Mount Lemmon Survey	·	1.1 km	MPC · JPL
565410	2017 DP_{79}	—	May 5, 2014	Kitt Peak	Spacewatch	PHO	900 m	MPC · JPL
565411	2017 DR_{79}	—	February 13, 2004	Kitt Peak	Spacewatch	·	1.4 km	MPC · JPL
565412	2017 DE_{80}	—	February 7, 2002	Kitt Peak	Spacewatch	·	910 m	MPC · JPL
565413	2017 DQ_{80}	—	February 11, 2013	Nogales	M. Schwartz, P. R. Holvorcem	·	1.7 km	MPC · JPL
565414	2017 DS_{80}	—	May 9, 2006	Mount Lemmon	Mount Lemmon Survey	NYS	1.1 km	MPC · JPL
565415	2017 DC_{81}	—	February 13, 2013	ESA OGS	ESA OGS	·	840 m	MPC · JPL
565416	2017 DF_{81}	—	August 27, 2000	Cerro Tololo	Deep Ecliptic Survey	·	950 m	MPC · JPL
565417	2017 DM_{81}	—	November 23, 2003	Kitt Peak	Spacewatch	·	1.3 km	MPC · JPL
565418	2017 DQ_{81}	—	January 7, 2017	Mount Lemmon	Mount Lemmon Survey	PHO	780 m	MPC · JPL
565419	2017 DW_{81}	—	April 7, 2006	Kitt Peak	Spacewatch	·	1.4 km	MPC · JPL
565420	2017 DK_{82}	—	October 19, 2015	Haleakala	Pan-STARRS 1	·	880 m	MPC · JPL
565421	2017 DM_{82}	—	September 22, 2003	Kitt Peak	Spacewatch	·	1.0 km	MPC · JPL
565422	2017 DC_{83}	—	January 20, 1996	Kitt Peak	Spacewatch	·	1.4 km	MPC · JPL
565423	2017 DE_{83}	—	December 30, 2008	Mount Lemmon	Mount Lemmon Survey	HNS	1.1 km	MPC · JPL
565424	2017 DB_{84}	—	February 22, 2006	Catalina	CSS	PHO	690 m	MPC · JPL
565425	2017 DL_{84}	—	October 10, 2004	Kitt Peak	Spacewatch	·	1.1 km	MPC · JPL
565426	2017 DM_{84}	—	February 13, 2004	Kitt Peak	Spacewatch	HNS	1.1 km	MPC · JPL
565427	2017 DZ_{84}	—	February 3, 2013	Haleakala	Pan-STARRS 1	·	1.1 km	MPC · JPL
565428	2017 DC_{85}	—	January 26, 2006	Mount Lemmon	Mount Lemmon Survey	·	1.0 km	MPC · JPL
565429	2017 DD_{85}	—	March 11, 2013	Mount Lemmon	Mount Lemmon Survey	EUN	1.0 km	MPC · JPL
565430	2017 DP_{85}	—	January 2, 2017	Haleakala	Pan-STARRS 1	·	1.1 km	MPC · JPL
565431	2017 DG_{86}	—	September 21, 2012	Mount Lemmon	Mount Lemmon Survey	·	860 m	MPC · JPL
565432	2017 DX_{86}	—	February 1, 2006	Kitt Peak	Spacewatch	·	950 m	MPC · JPL
565433	2017 DD_{87}	—	January 17, 2010	Kitt Peak	Spacewatch	PHO	1.1 km	MPC · JPL
565434	2017 DL_{87}	—	December 20, 2004	Mount Lemmon	Mount Lemmon Survey	·	1.2 km	MPC · JPL
565435	2017 DM_{87}	—	September 24, 2011	Haleakala	Pan-STARRS 1	·	1.2 km	MPC · JPL
565436	2017 DO_{87}	—	February 22, 2006	Socorro	LINEAR	·	1.4 km	MPC · JPL
565437	2017 DJ_{88}	—	April 26, 2004	Kitt Peak	Spacewatch	·	2.5 km	MPC · JPL
565438	2017 DN_{89}	—	December 22, 2003	Socorro	LINEAR	·	1.4 km	MPC · JPL
565439	2017 DZ_{89}	—	December 28, 2005	Mount Lemmon	Mount Lemmon Survey	·	2.8 km	MPC · JPL
565440	2017 DE_{91}	—	November 21, 2015	Mount Lemmon	Mount Lemmon Survey	EOS	1.3 km	MPC · JPL
565441	2017 DP_{91}	—	September 12, 2002	Palomar	NEAT	·	2.1 km	MPC · JPL
565442	2017 DT_{92}	—	December 4, 2005	Kitt Peak	Spacewatch	·	980 m	MPC · JPL
565443	2017 DC_{93}	—	September 18, 2010	Mount Lemmon	Mount Lemmon Survey	·	1.2 km	MPC · JPL
565444	2017 DH_{93}	—	March 19, 2013	Haleakala	Pan-STARRS 1	EUN	780 m	MPC · JPL
565445	2017 DQ_{93}	—	February 14, 2013	Haleakala	Pan-STARRS 1	·	750 m	MPC · JPL
565446	2017 DT_{93}	—	March 5, 2002	Apache Point	SDSS Collaboration	·	1.3 km	MPC · JPL
565447	2017 DA_{94}	—	March 8, 2006	Kitt Peak	Spacewatch	·	1.1 km	MPC · JPL
565448	2017 DE_{95}	—	March 6, 2013	Haleakala	Pan-STARRS 1	·	1.3 km	MPC · JPL
565449	2017 DG_{96}	—	October 18, 2007	Kitt Peak	Spacewatch	·	1.3 km	MPC · JPL
565450	2017 DQ_{96}	—	January 26, 2017	Haleakala	Pan-STARRS 1	HNS	1.0 km	MPC · JPL
565451	2017 DS_{97}	—	January 26, 2006	Kitt Peak	Spacewatch	·	1.1 km	MPC · JPL
565452	2017 DC_{98}	—	October 18, 1998	Kitt Peak	Spacewatch	·	1.4 km	MPC · JPL
565453	2017 DA_{99}	—	February 15, 2013	Haleakala	Pan-STARRS 1	·	1.2 km	MPC · JPL
565454	2017 DK_{99}	—	August 9, 2007	Kitt Peak	Spacewatch	PHO	890 m	MPC · JPL
565455	2017 DX_{99}	—	September 23, 2008	Kitt Peak	Spacewatch	·	1.0 km	MPC · JPL
565456	2017 DJ_{100}	—	January 18, 2004	Palomar	NEAT	·	1.1 km	MPC · JPL
565457	2017 DR_{100}	—	June 28, 2014	Haleakala	Pan-STARRS 1	·	990 m	MPC · JPL
565458	2017 DC_{101}	—	January 10, 2006	Mount Lemmon	Mount Lemmon Survey	·	1.1 km	MPC · JPL
565459	2017 DQ_{101}	—	November 18, 2008	Kitt Peak	Spacewatch	·	990 m	MPC · JPL
565460	2017 DC_{102}	—	November 19, 2008	Kitt Peak	Spacewatch	·	960 m	MPC · JPL
565461	2017 DR_{102}	—	July 26, 2011	Haleakala	Pan-STARRS 1	V	590 m	MPC · JPL
565462	2017 DY_{102}	—	July 1, 2014	Haleakala	Pan-STARRS 1	·	900 m	MPC · JPL
565463	2017 DZ_{102}	—	April 11, 2013	Kitt Peak	Spacewatch	·	1.2 km	MPC · JPL
565464	2017 DR_{103}	—	February 29, 2008	Catalina	CSS	·	2.7 km	MPC · JPL
565465	2017 DX_{103}	—	January 30, 2017	Haleakala	Pan-STARRS 1	·	1.9 km	MPC · JPL
565466	2017 DZ_{103}	—	September 27, 2008	Mount Lemmon	Mount Lemmon Survey	·	1.1 km	MPC · JPL
565467	2017 DJ_{104}	—	December 15, 2007	Catalina	CSS	EUN	1.5 km	MPC · JPL
565468	2017 DM_{104}	—	February 18, 2017	Haleakala	Pan-STARRS 1	(194)	1.4 km	MPC · JPL
565469	2017 DO_{104}	—	January 22, 2002	Kitt Peak	Spacewatch	NYS	1.2 km	MPC · JPL
565470	2017 DD_{105}	—	October 26, 2005	Kitt Peak	Spacewatch	·	660 m	MPC · JPL
565471	2017 DK_{105}	—	October 23, 2011	Mount Lemmon	Mount Lemmon Survey	·	880 m	MPC · JPL
565472	2017 DM_{105}	—	April 2, 2006	Kitt Peak	Spacewatch	·	1.1 km	MPC · JPL
565473	2017 DR_{105}	—	November 30, 2005	Kitt Peak	Spacewatch	·	840 m	MPC · JPL
565474	2017 DV_{105}	—	August 24, 2008	Kitt Peak	Spacewatch	·	880 m	MPC · JPL
565475	2017 DY_{105}	—	December 29, 2005	Mount Lemmon	Mount Lemmon Survey	·	870 m	MPC · JPL
565476	2017 DT_{106}	—	November 12, 2005	Kitt Peak	Spacewatch	·	650 m	MPC · JPL
565477	2017 DX_{106}	—	November 20, 2015	Mount Lemmon	Mount Lemmon Survey	MAR	980 m	MPC · JPL
565478	2017 DE_{107}	—	November 4, 2012	Kitt Peak	Spacewatch	·	1.2 km	MPC · JPL
565479	2017 DA_{108}	—	May 6, 2005	Mount Lemmon	Mount Lemmon Survey	·	930 m	MPC · JPL
565480	2017 DO_{108}	—	February 15, 2013	Haleakala	Pan-STARRS 1	·	1.3 km	MPC · JPL
565481	2017 DS_{108}	—	January 10, 2013	Haleakala	Pan-STARRS 1	V	590 m	MPC · JPL
565482	2017 DB_{110}	—	September 29, 2008	Mount Lemmon	Mount Lemmon Survey	·	1.1 km	MPC · JPL
565483	2017 DG_{110}	—	October 8, 2012	Mount Lemmon	Mount Lemmon Survey	·	700 m	MPC · JPL
565484	2017 DO_{110}	—	June 3, 2014	Haleakala	Pan-STARRS 1	·	2.2 km	MPC · JPL
565485	2017 DS_{110}	—	January 17, 2008	Mount Lemmon	Mount Lemmon Survey	·	2.5 km	MPC · JPL
565486	2017 DT_{110}	—	July 1, 2014	Haleakala	Pan-STARRS 1	·	1.4 km	MPC · JPL
565487	2017 DV_{110}	—	April 24, 2009	Mount Lemmon	Mount Lemmon Survey	·	910 m	MPC · JPL
565488	2017 DY_{110}	—	January 19, 2008	Mount Lemmon	Mount Lemmon Survey	·	1.5 km	MPC · JPL
565489	2017 DZ_{110}	—	October 8, 2008	Kitt Peak	Spacewatch	(2076)	780 m	MPC · JPL
565490	2017 DH_{111}	—	October 9, 2007	Mount Lemmon	Mount Lemmon Survey	·	1.2 km	MPC · JPL
565491	2017 DS_{111}	—	October 3, 2003	Kitt Peak	Spacewatch	EUN	1.3 km	MPC · JPL
565492	2017 DY_{111}	—	October 10, 2004	Kitt Peak	Spacewatch	V	970 m	MPC · JPL
565493	2017 DD_{113}	—	February 24, 2006	Kitt Peak	Spacewatch	·	970 m	MPC · JPL
565494	2017 DH_{113}	—	January 19, 2008	Mount Lemmon	Mount Lemmon Survey	JUN	960 m	MPC · JPL
565495	2017 DL_{113}	—	April 13, 2004	Palomar	NEAT	·	1.8 km	MPC · JPL
565496	2017 DD_{114}	—	February 15, 2010	Mount Lemmon	Mount Lemmon Survey	·	710 m	MPC · JPL
565497	2017 DE_{114}	—	February 16, 2010	Kitt Peak	Spacewatch	·	690 m	MPC · JPL
565498	2017 DG_{114}	—	December 30, 2005	Kitt Peak	Spacewatch	·	800 m	MPC · JPL
565499	2017 DJ_{114}	—	April 7, 2006	Kitt Peak	Spacewatch	·	870 m	MPC · JPL
565500	2017 DP_{114}	—	December 25, 2005	Kitt Peak	Spacewatch	V	610 m	MPC · JPL

== 565501–565600 ==
back to top

Designation			Discovery			Properties		Ref
Permanent	Provisional	Named after	Date	Site	Discoverer(s)	Category	Diam.	Ref
565501	2017 DQ_{114}	—	May 21, 2014	Haleakala	Pan-STARRS 1	·	700 m	MPC · JPL
565502	2017 DT_{114}	—	September 15, 2012	Catalina	CSS	·	890 m	MPC · JPL
565503	2017 DA_{115}	—	September 21, 2008	Kitt Peak	Spacewatch	·	1.0 km	MPC · JPL
565504	2017 DF_{115}	—	December 7, 2001	Kitt Peak	Spacewatch	MAS	650 m	MPC · JPL
565505	2017 DH_{115}	—	November 26, 2009	Mount Lemmon	Mount Lemmon Survey	·	770 m	MPC · JPL
565506	2017 DN_{115}	—	February 2, 2000	Kitt Peak	Spacewatch	MAR	1.2 km	MPC · JPL
565507	2017 DT_{115}	—	March 14, 2013	Kitt Peak	Spacewatch	·	1.1 km	MPC · JPL
565508	2017 DE_{116}	—	December 28, 2007	Kitt Peak	Spacewatch	·	1.8 km	MPC · JPL
565509	2017 DR_{116}	—	October 21, 2003	Kitt Peak	Spacewatch	·	1.3 km	MPC · JPL
565510	2017 DT_{116}	—	October 24, 2008	Kitt Peak	Spacewatch	PHO	1.0 km	MPC · JPL
565511	2017 DE_{117}	—	March 7, 2013	Siding Spring	SSS	MAR	1.1 km	MPC · JPL
565512	2017 DK_{117}	—	September 14, 2007	Mauna Kea	P. A. Wiegert	·	1.2 km	MPC · JPL
565513	2017 DM_{117}	—	January 21, 2013	Haleakala	Pan-STARRS 1	(1547)	1.5 km	MPC · JPL
565514	2017 DX_{117}	—	January 3, 2013	Mount Lemmon	Mount Lemmon Survey	·	1.4 km	MPC · JPL
565515	2017 DE_{118}	—	September 23, 2011	Kitt Peak	Spacewatch	V	750 m	MPC · JPL
565516	2017 DH_{118}	—	October 20, 2011	Haleakala	Pan-STARRS 1	·	1.8 km	MPC · JPL
565517	2017 DZ_{118}	—	January 21, 2006	Mount Lemmon	Mount Lemmon Survey	PHO	1.1 km	MPC · JPL
565518	2017 DA_{119}	—	December 6, 2005	Kitt Peak	Spacewatch	·	1.3 km	MPC · JPL
565519	2017 DC_{119}	—	February 2, 2006	Mount Lemmon	Mount Lemmon Survey	NYS	1.2 km	MPC · JPL
565520	2017 DF_{119}	—	January 7, 2006	Mount Lemmon	Mount Lemmon Survey	MAS	580 m	MPC · JPL
565521	2017 DK_{119}	—	April 13, 2010	Mount Lemmon	Mount Lemmon Survey	V	700 m	MPC · JPL
565522	2017 DP_{119}	—	November 13, 2007	Cerro Burek	Burek, Cerro	MAR	1.1 km	MPC · JPL
565523	2017 DU_{120}	—	April 12, 2013	Haleakala	Pan-STARRS 1	·	1.6 km	MPC · JPL
565524	2017 DE_{121}	—	March 14, 2013	Kitt Peak	Spacewatch	·	1.0 km	MPC · JPL
565525	2017 DR_{121}	—	January 16, 2013	Mount Lemmon	Mount Lemmon Survey	·	920 m	MPC · JPL
565526	2017 DX_{121}	—	August 20, 2014	Haleakala	Pan-STARRS 1	EUN	1.0 km	MPC · JPL
565527	2017 DY_{121}	—	November 3, 2011	Mount Lemmon	Mount Lemmon Survey	·	910 m	MPC · JPL
565528	2017 DC_{122}	—	April 12, 2005	Kitt Peak	Spacewatch	·	790 m	MPC · JPL
565529	2017 DG_{122}	—	July 1, 2014	Haleakala	Pan-STARRS 1	MAR	640 m	MPC · JPL
565530	2017 DK_{122}	—	August 22, 2014	Haleakala	Pan-STARRS 1	EUN	970 m	MPC · JPL
565531	2017 DC_{123}	—	April 10, 2013	Haleakala	Pan-STARRS 1	·	1.2 km	MPC · JPL
565532	2017 DR_{124}	—	February 24, 2017	Haleakala	Pan-STARRS 1	·	1.6 km	MPC · JPL
565533	2017 DP_{125}	—	February 21, 2017	Haleakala	Pan-STARRS 1	·	1.6 km	MPC · JPL
565534	2017 DS_{125}	—	January 23, 2006	Mount Lemmon	Mount Lemmon Survey	MAS	510 m	MPC · JPL
565535	2017 DW_{126}	—	February 16, 2017	Haleakala	Pan-STARRS 1	·	1.1 km	MPC · JPL
565536	2017 DP_{134}	—	February 25, 2017	Haleakala	Pan-STARRS 1	·	2.5 km	MPC · JPL
565537	2017 EP_{1}	—	December 29, 2011	Mount Lemmon	Mount Lemmon Survey	BAR	1.6 km	MPC · JPL
565538	2017 EW_{4}	—	December 4, 2007	Catalina	CSS	·	1.5 km	MPC · JPL
565539	2017 EZ_{4}	—	July 1, 2013	Siding Spring	SSS	·	2.7 km	MPC · JPL
565540	2017 EF_{5}	—	September 15, 2010	Mount Lemmon	Mount Lemmon Survey	MAR	1.4 km	MPC · JPL
565541	2017 ER_{5}	—	August 23, 2014	Haleakala	Pan-STARRS 1	·	1.7 km	MPC · JPL
565542	2017 ES_{5}	—	March 26, 2003	Kitt Peak	Spacewatch	·	1.1 km	MPC · JPL
565543	2017 EK_{6}	—	October 26, 2011	Haleakala	Pan-STARRS 1	·	1.2 km	MPC · JPL
565544	2017 EU_{7}	—	October 24, 2011	Haleakala	Pan-STARRS 1	·	1.2 km	MPC · JPL
565545	2017 EW_{7}	—	June 30, 2014	Haleakala	Pan-STARRS 1	EUN	1.3 km	MPC · JPL
565546	2017 EL_{8}	—	July 27, 2005	Palomar	NEAT	·	2.7 km	MPC · JPL
565547	2017 EU_{8}	—	February 17, 2004	Palomar	NEAT	EUN	1.3 km	MPC · JPL
565548	2017 ED_{9}	—	February 3, 2006	Mount Lemmon	Mount Lemmon Survey	·	1.4 km	MPC · JPL
565549	2017 EE_{9}	—	September 23, 2008	Mount Lemmon	Mount Lemmon Survey	·	1.1 km	MPC · JPL
565550	2017 EF_{9}	—	April 13, 2004	Kitt Peak	Spacewatch	·	750 m	MPC · JPL
565551	2017 EO_{9}	—	October 9, 2008	Mount Lemmon	Mount Lemmon Survey	·	1.2 km	MPC · JPL
565552	2017 EF_{12}	—	October 30, 2011	Kitt Peak	Spacewatch	·	1.2 km	MPC · JPL
565553	2017 EJ_{12}	—	September 6, 2015	Catalina	CSS	·	1.1 km	MPC · JPL
565554	2017 EY_{12}	—	February 20, 2006	Kitt Peak	Spacewatch	NYS	1.2 km	MPC · JPL
565555	2017 EG_{13}	—	July 24, 2015	Haleakala	Pan-STARRS 1	(2076)	700 m	MPC · JPL
565556	2017 EH_{13}	—	September 11, 2010	Mount Lemmon	Mount Lemmon Survey	KON	2.0 km	MPC · JPL
565557	2017 EA_{14}	—	October 21, 2007	Kitt Peak	Spacewatch	·	1.3 km	MPC · JPL
565558	2017 EN_{14}	—	March 13, 2013	Palomar	Palomar Transient Factory	·	1.2 km	MPC · JPL
565559	2017 EV_{14}	—	August 12, 2015	Haleakala	Pan-STARRS 1	V	660 m	MPC · JPL
565560	2017 EZ_{14}	—	February 1, 2003	Palomar	NEAT	·	2.0 km	MPC · JPL
565561	2017 EJ_{17}	—	January 23, 2006	Kitt Peak	Spacewatch	·	890 m	MPC · JPL
565562	2017 EV_{17}	—	March 26, 2004	Kitt Peak	Spacewatch	·	1.5 km	MPC · JPL
565563	2017 EW_{17}	—	October 8, 2008	Kitt Peak	Spacewatch	·	970 m	MPC · JPL
565564	2017 EE_{18}	—	November 18, 2008	Kitt Peak	Spacewatch	·	1.1 km	MPC · JPL
565565	2017 EZ_{18}	—	September 25, 2005	Kitt Peak	Spacewatch	·	1.8 km	MPC · JPL
565566	2017 EE_{19}	—	June 24, 2007	Lulin	LUSS	·	1.1 km	MPC · JPL
565567	2017 EO_{19}	—	October 31, 2012	Haleakala	Pan-STARRS 1	PHO	850 m	MPC · JPL
565568	2017 EX_{20}	—	April 5, 2013	Palomar	Palomar Transient Factory	HNS	780 m	MPC · JPL
565569	2017 EA_{21}	—	December 1, 1994	Kitt Peak	Spacewatch	MAR	1.3 km	MPC · JPL
565570	2017 ED_{21}	—	February 23, 2017	Mount Lemmon	Mount Lemmon Survey	·	1.1 km	MPC · JPL
565571 Shtol	2017 EK_{21}	Shtol	November 24, 2011	Zelenchukskaya Stn	T. V. Krjačko, Satovski, B.	·	2.0 km	MPC · JPL
565572	2017 EK_{23}	—	November 16, 2001	Kitt Peak	Spacewatch	MAS	640 m	MPC · JPL
565573	2017 ER_{23}	—	October 27, 2006	Mount Lemmon	Mount Lemmon Survey	·	1.2 km	MPC · JPL
565574	2017 ET_{23}	—	September 29, 2009	Mount Lemmon	Mount Lemmon Survey	·	2.0 km	MPC · JPL
565575	2017 EU_{23}	—	March 16, 2007	Mount Lemmon	Mount Lemmon Survey	·	2.5 km	MPC · JPL
565576	2017 EA_{24}	—	May 15, 2013	Haleakala	Pan-STARRS 1	·	1.5 km	MPC · JPL
565577	2017 EE_{24}	—	December 29, 2011	Mount Lemmon	Mount Lemmon Survey	·	1.6 km	MPC · JPL
565578	2017 EG_{24}	—	April 17, 2013	Haleakala	Pan-STARRS 1	·	1.1 km	MPC · JPL
565579	2017 EU_{24}	—	May 8, 2013	Haleakala	Pan-STARRS 1	·	1.4 km	MPC · JPL
565580	2017 EV_{24}	—	September 23, 2015	Haleakala	Pan-STARRS 1	·	1.2 km	MPC · JPL
565581	2017 EC_{34}	—	July 27, 2014	Haleakala	Pan-STARRS 1	EUN	1.1 km	MPC · JPL
565582	2017 FQ_{3}	—	November 30, 2008	Kitt Peak	Spacewatch	MAS	730 m	MPC · JPL
565583	2017 FQ_{4}	—	February 6, 2013	Nogales	M. Schwartz, P. R. Holvorcem	·	870 m	MPC · JPL
565584	2017 FD_{5}	—	February 26, 2009	Kitt Peak	Spacewatch	·	1.1 km	MPC · JPL
565585	2017 FQ_{5}	—	September 22, 1995	Kitt Peak	Spacewatch	·	1.3 km	MPC · JPL
565586	2017 FW_{5}	—	March 17, 2005	Kitt Peak	Spacewatch	·	1.0 km	MPC · JPL
565587	2017 FA_{6}	—	March 4, 2013	Haleakala	Pan-STARRS 1	·	1.3 km	MPC · JPL
565588	2017 FE_{6}	—	March 5, 2006	Kitt Peak	Spacewatch	·	1.3 km	MPC · JPL
565589	2017 FL_{6}	—	April 2, 2006	Kitt Peak	Spacewatch	·	1.1 km	MPC · JPL
565590	2017 FV_{6}	—	October 22, 2011	Mount Lemmon	Mount Lemmon Survey	·	830 m	MPC · JPL
565591	2017 FQ_{7}	—	September 19, 2001	Socorro	LINEAR	·	700 m	MPC · JPL
565592	2017 FC_{8}	—	April 21, 2009	Mount Lemmon	Mount Lemmon Survey	·	1.2 km	MPC · JPL
565593	2017 FO_{8}	—	December 23, 2012	Haleakala	Pan-STARRS 1	·	1.9 km	MPC · JPL
565594	2017 FW_{8}	—	April 8, 1996	Haleakala	AMOS	·	1.5 km	MPC · JPL
565595	2017 FK_{9}	—	March 5, 2013	Haleakala	Pan-STARRS 1	·	1.2 km	MPC · JPL
565596	2017 FR_{9}	—	August 4, 2014	Haleakala	Pan-STARRS 1	·	1.1 km	MPC · JPL
565597	2017 FV_{9}	—	November 11, 2006	Kitt Peak	Spacewatch	·	2.4 km	MPC · JPL
565598	2017 FF_{10}	—	September 12, 2015	Haleakala	Pan-STARRS 1	·	1.5 km	MPC · JPL
565599	2017 FO_{10}	—	October 26, 2001	Haleakala	NEAT	PHO	1.2 km	MPC · JPL
565600	2017 FB_{11}	—	December 23, 2012	Haleakala	Pan-STARRS 1	·	1.2 km	MPC · JPL

== 565601–565700 ==
back to top

Designation			Discovery			Properties		Ref
Permanent	Provisional	Named after	Date	Site	Discoverer(s)	Category	Diam.	Ref
565601	2017 FS_{11}	—	September 23, 2015	Haleakala	Pan-STARRS 1	V	620 m	MPC · JPL
565602	2017 FZ_{11}	—	October 11, 2015	Mount Lemmon	Mount Lemmon Survey	·	1.4 km	MPC · JPL
565603	2017 FS_{12}	—	December 9, 2012	Mount Lemmon	Mount Lemmon Survey	V	680 m	MPC · JPL
565604	2017 FB_{13}	—	November 3, 2015	Mount Lemmon	Mount Lemmon Survey	·	790 m	MPC · JPL
565605	2017 FG_{13}	—	May 13, 2007	Mount Lemmon	Mount Lemmon Survey	·	950 m	MPC · JPL
565606	2017 FK_{13}	—	December 11, 2004	Kitt Peak	Spacewatch	·	1.3 km	MPC · JPL
565607	2017 FT_{13}	—	August 3, 2014	Haleakala	Pan-STARRS 1	·	980 m	MPC · JPL
565608	2017 FM_{14}	—	March 7, 2013	Mount Lemmon	Mount Lemmon Survey	·	1.5 km	MPC · JPL
565609	2017 FN_{14}	—	August 29, 2006	Catalina	CSS	·	1.8 km	MPC · JPL
565610	2017 FQ_{14}	—	March 26, 2006	Nashville	Clingan, R.	MAS	790 m	MPC · JPL
565611	2017 FR_{14}	—	June 18, 2010	Mount Lemmon	Mount Lemmon Survey	·	1.2 km	MPC · JPL
565612	2017 FD_{15}	—	January 19, 2013	Mount Lemmon	Mount Lemmon Survey	NYS	910 m	MPC · JPL
565613	2017 FQ_{15}	—	March 23, 2004	Kitt Peak	Spacewatch	·	1.3 km	MPC · JPL
565614	2017 FZ_{15}	—	August 10, 2007	Kitt Peak	Spacewatch	·	1.5 km	MPC · JPL
565615	2017 FC_{20}	—	October 10, 2007	Mount Lemmon	Mount Lemmon Survey	NYS	1.1 km	MPC · JPL
565616	2017 FN_{20}	—	October 3, 2010	Catalina	CSS	·	1.9 km	MPC · JPL
565617	2017 FS_{20}	—	August 12, 2015	Haleakala	Pan-STARRS 1	EUN	840 m	MPC · JPL
565618	2017 FP_{21}	—	October 25, 2003	Kitt Peak	Spacewatch	·	1.5 km	MPC · JPL
565619	2017 FH_{22}	—	October 19, 2006	Kitt Peak	Deep Ecliptic Survey	JUN	890 m	MPC · JPL
565620	2017 FN_{22}	—	September 14, 2010	Mount Lemmon	Mount Lemmon Survey	·	870 m	MPC · JPL
565621	2017 FO_{22}	—	April 8, 2010	Kitt Peak	Spacewatch	·	980 m	MPC · JPL
565622	2017 FJ_{23}	—	July 2, 2015	Haleakala	Pan-STARRS 1	PHO	820 m	MPC · JPL
565623	2017 FQ_{23}	—	December 18, 2012	Oukaïmeden	M. Ory	·	1.1 km	MPC · JPL
565624	2017 FV_{23}	—	August 20, 2014	Haleakala	Pan-STARRS 1	·	930 m	MPC · JPL
565625	2017 FS_{24}	—	April 2, 2006	Kitt Peak	Spacewatch	V	790 m	MPC · JPL
565626	2017 FO_{25}	—	June 17, 2005	Mount Lemmon	Mount Lemmon Survey	·	1.1 km	MPC · JPL
565627	2017 FU_{25}	—	November 20, 2007	Mount Lemmon	Mount Lemmon Survey	·	1.2 km	MPC · JPL
565628	2017 FX_{25}	—	May 5, 2010	Mount Lemmon	Mount Lemmon Survey	V	600 m	MPC · JPL
565629	2017 FJ_{26}	—	January 16, 2009	Kitt Peak	Spacewatch	·	960 m	MPC · JPL
565630	2017 FT_{27}	—	July 26, 2014	Haleakala	Pan-STARRS 1	·	1.2 km	MPC · JPL
565631	2017 FM_{28}	—	November 16, 2015	Haleakala	Pan-STARRS 1	MAR	920 m	MPC · JPL
565632	2017 FV_{28}	—	March 14, 2004	Kitt Peak	Spacewatch	·	1.6 km	MPC · JPL
565633	2017 FG_{29}	—	February 2, 2008	Kitt Peak	Spacewatch	EUN	1.2 km	MPC · JPL
565634	2017 FR_{29}	—	March 23, 2006	Kitt Peak	Spacewatch	·	810 m	MPC · JPL
565635	2017 FB_{30}	—	January 12, 2002	Kitt Peak	Spacewatch	·	840 m	MPC · JPL
565636	2017 FQ_{30}	—	September 18, 2014	Haleakala	Pan-STARRS 1	·	1.5 km	MPC · JPL
565637	2017 FO_{31}	—	February 10, 2008	Anderson Mesa	LONEOS	·	1.5 km	MPC · JPL
565638	2017 FT_{31}	—	August 20, 2014	Haleakala	Pan-STARRS 1	·	1.1 km	MPC · JPL
565639	2017 FV_{31}	—	March 12, 2000	Kitt Peak	Spacewatch	·	1.6 km	MPC · JPL
565640	2017 FC_{32}	—	March 18, 2017	Mount Lemmon	Mount Lemmon Survey	HNS	1.1 km	MPC · JPL
565641	2017 FK_{32}	—	March 19, 2013	Haleakala	Pan-STARRS 1	·	1.0 km	MPC · JPL
565642	2017 FN_{32}	—	February 16, 2004	Catalina	CSS	·	1.5 km	MPC · JPL
565643	2017 FT_{32}	—	October 25, 2011	Haleakala	Pan-STARRS 1	·	1.1 km	MPC · JPL
565644	2017 FX_{32}	—	September 24, 2006	Kitt Peak	Spacewatch	·	1.7 km	MPC · JPL
565645	2017 FZ_{32}	—	January 29, 2012	Mount Lemmon	Mount Lemmon Survey	·	1.9 km	MPC · JPL
565646	2017 FD_{33}	—	October 1, 2010	Mount Lemmon	Mount Lemmon Survey	EUN	910 m	MPC · JPL
565647	2017 FD_{34}	—	April 19, 2006	Mount Lemmon	Mount Lemmon Survey	PHO	730 m	MPC · JPL
565648	2017 FJ_{35}	—	March 2, 2006	Kitt Peak	Spacewatch	MAS	670 m	MPC · JPL
565649	2017 FV_{35}	—	June 21, 2010	Mount Lemmon	Mount Lemmon Survey	·	1.1 km	MPC · JPL
565650	2017 FZ_{35}	—	February 27, 2004	Kitt Peak	Deep Ecliptic Survey	ADE	1.6 km	MPC · JPL
565651	2017 FZ_{36}	—	July 26, 2006	Siding Spring	SSS	·	1.6 km	MPC · JPL
565652	2017 FG_{37}	—	December 1, 2008	Kitt Peak	Spacewatch	·	850 m	MPC · JPL
565653	2017 FC_{38}	—	November 30, 2008	Mount Lemmon	Mount Lemmon Survey	·	1.0 km	MPC · JPL
565654	2017 FJ_{38}	—	September 4, 2011	Haleakala	Pan-STARRS 1	·	1.1 km	MPC · JPL
565655	2017 FC_{39}	—	April 9, 2002	Palomar	NEAT	·	1.6 km	MPC · JPL
565656	2017 FP_{39}	—	April 2, 2013	Haleakala	Pan-STARRS 1	·	1.1 km	MPC · JPL
565657	2017 FS_{39}	—	January 30, 2006	Kitt Peak	Spacewatch	·	690 m	MPC · JPL
565658	2017 FX_{39}	—	April 30, 2009	Kitt Peak	Spacewatch	·	990 m	MPC · JPL
565659	2017 FA_{40}	—	April 11, 2013	Kitt Peak	Spacewatch	·	1.0 km	MPC · JPL
565660	2017 FE_{40}	—	February 9, 2013	Haleakala	Pan-STARRS 1	·	940 m	MPC · JPL
565661	2017 FP_{40}	—	October 8, 2015	Haleakala	Pan-STARRS 1	·	740 m	MPC · JPL
565662	2017 FR_{40}	—	May 12, 2010	Mount Lemmon	Mount Lemmon Survey	·	1.3 km	MPC · JPL
565663	2017 FY_{40}	—	October 19, 2003	Kitt Peak	Spacewatch	NYS	1.3 km	MPC · JPL
565664	2017 FG_{41}	—	January 23, 2006	Kitt Peak	Spacewatch	·	850 m	MPC · JPL
565665	2017 FP_{41}	—	September 26, 2006	Mount Lemmon	Mount Lemmon Survey	ADE	1.6 km	MPC · JPL
565666	2017 FQ_{41}	—	December 30, 2005	Mount Lemmon	Mount Lemmon Survey	·	940 m	MPC · JPL
565667	2017 FV_{41}	—	October 20, 2006	Kitt Peak	Spacewatch	·	1.4 km	MPC · JPL
565668	2017 FP_{42}	—	May 5, 2006	Kitt Peak	Spacewatch	·	1.2 km	MPC · JPL
565669	2017 FX_{42}	—	August 22, 2001	Kitt Peak	Spacewatch	EUN	1.2 km	MPC · JPL
565670	2017 FB_{44}	—	February 10, 2008	Kitt Peak	Spacewatch	·	1.8 km	MPC · JPL
565671	2017 FR_{45}	—	November 3, 2004	Kitt Peak	Spacewatch	·	1.5 km	MPC · JPL
565672	2017 FG_{46}	—	August 19, 2014	Haleakala	Pan-STARRS 1	·	1.1 km	MPC · JPL
565673	2017 FW_{48}	—	February 3, 2012	Mount Lemmon	Mount Lemmon Survey	·	1.4 km	MPC · JPL
565674	2017 FR_{50}	—	March 24, 2006	Kitt Peak	Spacewatch	NYS	1.2 km	MPC · JPL
565675	2017 FO_{51}	—	December 30, 2008	Mount Lemmon	Mount Lemmon Survey	·	1.3 km	MPC · JPL
565676	2017 FU_{51}	—	December 21, 2003	Kitt Peak	Spacewatch	·	1.2 km	MPC · JPL
565677	2017 FC_{52}	—	November 24, 2011	Haleakala	Pan-STARRS 1	MAR	1.1 km	MPC · JPL
565678	2017 FO_{52}	—	December 11, 2010	Mount Lemmon	Mount Lemmon Survey	·	1.7 km	MPC · JPL
565679	2017 FL_{54}	—	April 18, 2009	Kitt Peak	Spacewatch	·	1.3 km	MPC · JPL
565680	2017 FR_{54}	—	November 11, 2001	Apache Point	SDSS	·	1.9 km	MPC · JPL
565681	2017 FS_{54}	—	November 23, 2011	Kitt Peak	Spacewatch	·	1.1 km	MPC · JPL
565682	2017 FP_{57}	—	April 13, 2013	Haleakala	Pan-STARRS 1	·	1.8 km	MPC · JPL
565683	2017 FR_{58}	—	March 19, 2009	Kitt Peak	Spacewatch	·	1.6 km	MPC · JPL
565684	2017 FT_{59}	—	November 3, 2015	Mount Lemmon	Mount Lemmon Survey	SUL	1.6 km	MPC · JPL
565685	2017 FK_{60}	—	October 12, 2007	Catalina	CSS	SUL	2.3 km	MPC · JPL
565686	2017 FV_{60}	—	December 4, 2007	Mount Lemmon	Mount Lemmon Survey	RAF	860 m	MPC · JPL
565687	2017 FE_{61}	—	May 25, 2006	Mount Lemmon	Mount Lemmon Survey	·	1.5 km	MPC · JPL
565688	2017 FX_{61}	—	December 10, 2009	Mount Lemmon	Mount Lemmon Survey	VER	2.1 km	MPC · JPL
565689	2017 FK_{64}	—	November 17, 2007	Catalina	CSS	·	1.6 km	MPC · JPL
565690	2017 FW_{65}	—	November 17, 2007	Mount Lemmon	Mount Lemmon Survey	·	1.0 km	MPC · JPL
565691	2017 FH_{66}	—	October 26, 2011	Haleakala	Pan-STARRS 1	·	1.1 km	MPC · JPL
565692	2017 FS_{67}	—	April 14, 2010	Mount Lemmon	Mount Lemmon Survey	·	950 m	MPC · JPL
565693	2017 FV_{67}	—	December 4, 2008	Mount Lemmon	Mount Lemmon Survey	·	1.0 km	MPC · JPL
565694	2017 FW_{67}	—	August 28, 2014	Haleakala	Pan-STARRS 1	·	2.3 km	MPC · JPL
565695	2017 FV_{69}	—	September 3, 2008	Kitt Peak	Spacewatch	·	760 m	MPC · JPL
565696	2017 FX_{69}	—	December 21, 2012	Mount Lemmon	Mount Lemmon Survey	·	1.0 km	MPC · JPL
565697	2017 FA_{70}	—	March 13, 2013	Mount Lemmon	Mount Lemmon Survey	·	850 m	MPC · JPL
565698	2017 FF_{70}	—	January 18, 2004	Catalina	CSS	·	1.7 km	MPC · JPL
565699	2017 FZ_{71}	—	December 22, 2008	Mount Lemmon	Mount Lemmon Survey	·	1.1 km	MPC · JPL
565700	2017 FB_{72}	—	February 13, 2002	Kitt Peak	Spacewatch	PHO	1.0 km	MPC · JPL

== 565701–565800 ==
back to top

Designation			Discovery			Properties		Ref
Permanent	Provisional	Named after	Date	Site	Discoverer(s)	Category	Diam.	Ref
565701	2017 FT_{72}	—	September 19, 2011	Mount Lemmon	Mount Lemmon Survey	·	910 m	MPC · JPL
565702	2017 FG_{74}	—	June 29, 2014	Mount Lemmon	Mount Lemmon Survey	·	1.4 km	MPC · JPL
565703	2017 FP_{74}	—	July 4, 2010	Kitt Peak	Spacewatch	·	1.0 km	MPC · JPL
565704	2017 FW_{74}	—	September 15, 2007	Mount Lemmon	Mount Lemmon Survey	V	590 m	MPC · JPL
565705	2017 FA_{75}	—	September 23, 2015	Haleakala	Pan-STARRS 1	·	1.2 km	MPC · JPL
565706	2017 FH_{77}	—	August 31, 2014	Mount Lemmon	Mount Lemmon Survey	·	1.4 km	MPC · JPL
565707	2017 FW_{77}	—	January 22, 1998	Kitt Peak	Spacewatch	MAS	680 m	MPC · JPL
565708	2017 FY_{77}	—	October 9, 2010	Kitt Peak	Spacewatch	·	1.7 km	MPC · JPL
565709	2017 FL_{79}	—	February 17, 2013	Kitt Peak	Spacewatch	(5)	1.0 km	MPC · JPL
565710	2017 FN_{79}	—	October 27, 2005	Catalina	CSS	·	700 m	MPC · JPL
565711	2017 FU_{81}	—	October 12, 2007	Kitt Peak	Spacewatch	·	890 m	MPC · JPL
565712	2017 FA_{82}	—	November 2, 2010	Mount Lemmon	Mount Lemmon Survey	·	1.3 km	MPC · JPL
565713	2017 FB_{82}	—	September 19, 2010	Kitt Peak	Spacewatch	MAR	1.0 km	MPC · JPL
565714	2017 FJ_{82}	—	February 28, 2008	Mount Lemmon	Mount Lemmon Survey	·	1.5 km	MPC · JPL
565715	2017 FM_{82}	—	May 13, 2004	Kitt Peak	Spacewatch	·	1.8 km	MPC · JPL
565716	2017 FL_{83}	—	November 2, 2007	Mount Lemmon	Mount Lemmon Survey	·	970 m	MPC · JPL
565717	2017 FC_{84}	—	September 9, 2015	Haleakala	Pan-STARRS 1	·	1.4 km	MPC · JPL
565718	2017 FD_{84}	—	February 22, 2009	Kitt Peak	Spacewatch	·	1.7 km	MPC · JPL
565719	2017 FQ_{84}	—	September 10, 2015	Haleakala	Pan-STARRS 1	·	1.0 km	MPC · JPL
565720	2017 FV_{86}	—	July 27, 2014	Haleakala	Pan-STARRS 1	·	880 m	MPC · JPL
565721	2017 FM_{87}	—	September 13, 2007	Mount Lemmon	Mount Lemmon Survey	·	1.1 km	MPC · JPL
565722	2017 FF_{88}	—	February 16, 2013	Kitt Peak	Spacewatch	·	1.4 km	MPC · JPL
565723	2017 FG_{88}	—	September 30, 2006	Mount Lemmon	Mount Lemmon Survey	·	990 m	MPC · JPL
565724	2017 FK_{88}	—	April 5, 2000	Socorro	LINEAR	EUN	1.3 km	MPC · JPL
565725	2017 FL_{88}	—	June 20, 2014	Haleakala	Pan-STARRS 1	V	590 m	MPC · JPL
565726	2017 FW_{88}	—	October 1, 2005	Mount Lemmon	Mount Lemmon Survey	·	1.7 km	MPC · JPL
565727	2017 FQ_{89}	—	March 25, 2003	Palomar	NEAT	·	2.0 km	MPC · JPL
565728	2017 FY_{91}	—	March 23, 2003	Apache Point	SDSS Collaboration	·	2.3 km	MPC · JPL
565729	2017 FL_{92}	—	April 15, 2013	Haleakala	Pan-STARRS 1	·	1.4 km	MPC · JPL
565730	2017 FQ_{92}	—	November 11, 2009	Mount Lemmon	Mount Lemmon Survey	EOS	2.2 km	MPC · JPL
565731	2017 FA_{94}	—	September 17, 2014	Haleakala	Pan-STARRS 1	·	1.1 km	MPC · JPL
565732	2017 FZ_{94}	—	March 15, 2007	Mount Lemmon	Mount Lemmon Survey	·	2.5 km	MPC · JPL
565733	2017 FC_{95}	—	July 1, 2014	Haleakala	Pan-STARRS 1	·	1.1 km	MPC · JPL
565734	2017 FG_{95}	—	December 14, 2010	Mount Lemmon	Mount Lemmon Survey	·	2.2 km	MPC · JPL
565735	2017 FE_{96}	—	September 19, 2014	Haleakala	Pan-STARRS 1	·	1.2 km	MPC · JPL
565736	2017 FH_{96}	—	January 3, 2004	Pla D'Arguines	R. Ferrando	·	1.1 km	MPC · JPL
565737	2017 FD_{97}	—	March 19, 2004	Palomar	NEAT	·	1.5 km	MPC · JPL
565738	2017 FG_{97}	—	December 1, 2005	Mount Lemmon	Mount Lemmon Survey	·	1.0 km	MPC · JPL
565739	2017 FH_{97}	—	April 5, 2002	Palomar	NEAT	NYS	1.0 km	MPC · JPL
565740	2017 FP_{97}	—	April 4, 2013	Haleakala	Pan-STARRS 1	EUN	1.1 km	MPC · JPL
565741	2017 FE_{98}	—	March 4, 2017	Haleakala	Pan-STARRS 1	·	1.0 km	MPC · JPL
565742	2017 FU_{98}	—	September 4, 2011	Haleakala	Pan-STARRS 1	·	900 m	MPC · JPL
565743	2017 FW_{98}	—	April 12, 2013	Haleakala	Pan-STARRS 1	·	1.8 km	MPC · JPL
565744	2017 FZ_{98}	—	June 24, 2014	Haleakala	Pan-STARRS 1	·	1.2 km	MPC · JPL
565745	2017 FA_{99}	—	January 19, 2013	Mount Lemmon	Mount Lemmon Survey	·	1.4 km	MPC · JPL
565746	2017 FJ_{99}	—	December 4, 2007	Mount Lemmon	Mount Lemmon Survey	·	990 m	MPC · JPL
565747	2017 FV_{99}	—	December 30, 2007	Kitt Peak	Spacewatch	EUN	1.0 km	MPC · JPL
565748	2017 FU_{100}	—	August 3, 2014	Haleakala	Pan-STARRS 1	NYS	1.1 km	MPC · JPL
565749	2017 FY_{100}	—	January 25, 2009	Kitt Peak	Spacewatch	·	1.2 km	MPC · JPL
565750	2017 FO_{103}	—	April 11, 2004	Palomar	NEAT	JUN	860 m	MPC · JPL
565751	2017 FY_{103}	—	September 23, 2015	Haleakala	Pan-STARRS 1	·	1.2 km	MPC · JPL
565752	2017 FB_{104}	—	August 15, 2009	Kitt Peak	Spacewatch	·	2.2 km	MPC · JPL
565753	2017 FS_{104}	—	October 24, 2011	Mount Lemmon	Mount Lemmon Survey	·	770 m	MPC · JPL
565754	2017 FA_{105}	—	November 26, 2011	Haleakala	Pan-STARRS 1	JUN	1.3 km	MPC · JPL
565755	2017 FF_{105}	—	October 10, 2015	Haleakala	Pan-STARRS 1	·	1.4 km	MPC · JPL
565756	2017 FD_{106}	—	December 8, 1998	Kitt Peak	Spacewatch	·	1.2 km	MPC · JPL
565757	2017 FQ_{106}	—	April 16, 2013	Haleakala	Pan-STARRS 1	·	1.3 km	MPC · JPL
565758	2017 FU_{106}	—	November 16, 2011	Mount Lemmon	Mount Lemmon Survey	·	1.5 km	MPC · JPL
565759	2017 FD_{108}	—	November 23, 2006	Kitt Peak	Spacewatch	·	1.8 km	MPC · JPL
565760	2017 FX_{108}	—	January 20, 2013	Kitt Peak	Spacewatch	NYS	940 m	MPC · JPL
565761	2017 FE_{109}	—	May 16, 2005	Mount Lemmon	Mount Lemmon Survey	·	830 m	MPC · JPL
565762	2017 FZ_{109}	—	October 28, 1994	Kitt Peak	Spacewatch	·	1.8 km	MPC · JPL
565763	2017 FK_{110}	—	September 26, 2014	Mount Lemmon	Mount Lemmon Survey	·	2.2 km	MPC · JPL
565764	2017 FN_{111}	—	September 30, 2003	Kitt Peak	Spacewatch	·	1.1 km	MPC · JPL
565765	2017 FH_{114}	—	November 3, 2015	Mount Lemmon	Mount Lemmon Survey	(5)	770 m	MPC · JPL
565766	2017 FO_{114}	—	April 7, 2003	Kitt Peak	Spacewatch	V	600 m	MPC · JPL
565767	2017 FT_{114}	—	November 20, 2004	Kitt Peak	Spacewatch	MAS	660 m	MPC · JPL
565768	2017 FB_{117}	—	November 18, 2008	Kitt Peak	Spacewatch	NYS	760 m	MPC · JPL
565769	2017 FS_{119}	—	April 4, 2010	Kitt Peak	Spacewatch	·	1.0 km	MPC · JPL
565770	2017 FY_{119}	—	April 10, 2013	Haleakala	Pan-STARRS 1	·	980 m	MPC · JPL
565771	2017 FR_{120}	—	August 10, 2007	Kitt Peak	Spacewatch	·	1.4 km	MPC · JPL
565772	2017 FW_{120}	—	September 23, 2015	Haleakala	Pan-STARRS 1	·	1.5 km	MPC · JPL
565773	2017 FF_{121}	—	April 19, 2013	Mount Lemmon	Mount Lemmon Survey	·	1.1 km	MPC · JPL
565774	2017 FG_{121}	—	March 19, 2017	Mount Lemmon	Mount Lemmon Survey	·	1.5 km	MPC · JPL
565775	2017 FH_{121}	—	November 1, 2006	Mount Lemmon	Mount Lemmon Survey	EUN	1.1 km	MPC · JPL
565776	2017 FL_{121}	—	March 10, 2008	Mount Lemmon	Mount Lemmon Survey	CLO	2.2 km	MPC · JPL
565777	2017 FP_{121}	—	September 23, 2008	Mount Lemmon	Mount Lemmon Survey	·	1.2 km	MPC · JPL
565778	2017 FT_{121}	—	April 4, 2008	Mount Lemmon	Mount Lemmon Survey	·	1.3 km	MPC · JPL
565779	2017 FY_{121}	—	March 16, 2013	Kitt Peak	Spacewatch	·	850 m	MPC · JPL
565780 Kopaszimre	2017 FQ_{122}	Kopaszimre	October 4, 2011	Piszkéstető	K. Sárneczky, T. Szalai	·	1.0 km	MPC · JPL
565781	2017 FB_{123}	—	April 12, 2013	Haleakala	Pan-STARRS 1	·	1.1 km	MPC · JPL
565782	2017 FM_{123}	—	February 7, 2008	Kitt Peak	Spacewatch	·	1.6 km	MPC · JPL
565783	2017 FJ_{124}	—	March 5, 2008	Kitt Peak	Spacewatch	·	1.7 km	MPC · JPL
565784	2017 FU_{124}	—	March 26, 2007	Mount Lemmon	Mount Lemmon Survey	·	880 m	MPC · JPL
565785	2017 FF_{125}	—	January 22, 2013	Mount Lemmon	Mount Lemmon Survey	V	720 m	MPC · JPL
565786	2017 FS_{125}	—	May 17, 2009	Kitt Peak	Spacewatch	·	840 m	MPC · JPL
565787	2017 FW_{125}	—	September 30, 2005	Kitt Peak	Spacewatch	·	2.0 km	MPC · JPL
565788	2017 FN_{126}	—	June 2, 2014	Haleakala	Pan-STARRS 1	·	890 m	MPC · JPL
565789	2017 FV_{126}	—	April 20, 2004	Socorro	LINEAR	MRX	1.2 km	MPC · JPL
565790	2017 FA_{127}	—	February 5, 2013	Kitt Peak	Spacewatch	·	1.5 km	MPC · JPL
565791	2017 FZ_{128}	—	September 17, 2001	Anderson Mesa	LONEOS	·	2.4 km	MPC · JPL
565792	2017 FT_{129}	—	April 10, 2013	Haleakala	Pan-STARRS 1	·	910 m	MPC · JPL
565793	2017 FB_{132}	—	September 15, 2006	Kitt Peak	Spacewatch	HNS	990 m	MPC · JPL
565794	2017 FX_{132}	—	March 19, 2013	Haleakala	Pan-STARRS 1	(5)	950 m	MPC · JPL
565795	2017 FH_{133}	—	November 4, 2007	Mount Lemmon	Mount Lemmon Survey	V	840 m	MPC · JPL
565796	2017 FQ_{133}	—	March 19, 2010	Mount Lemmon	Mount Lemmon Survey	·	720 m	MPC · JPL
565797	2017 FG_{134}	—	April 16, 2013	Haleakala	Pan-STARRS 1	·	1.2 km	MPC · JPL
565798	2017 FF_{135}	—	May 6, 2003	Kitt Peak	Spacewatch	·	680 m	MPC · JPL
565799	2017 FA_{136}	—	April 18, 2013	Kitt Peak	Spacewatch	EUN	910 m	MPC · JPL
565800	2017 FL_{136}	—	October 9, 2010	Mount Lemmon	Mount Lemmon Survey	·	1.3 km	MPC · JPL

== 565801–565900 ==
back to top

Designation			Discovery			Properties		Ref
Permanent	Provisional	Named after	Date	Site	Discoverer(s)	Category	Diam.	Ref
565801	2017 FT_{138}	—	February 16, 2010	Kitt Peak	Spacewatch	·	700 m	MPC · JPL
565802	2017 FW_{138}	—	October 10, 2015	Catalina	CSS	V	710 m	MPC · JPL
565803	2017 FA_{140}	—	December 1, 2005	Kitt Peak	Spacewatch	·	810 m	MPC · JPL
565804	2017 FG_{140}	—	September 30, 2008	Mount Lemmon	Mount Lemmon Survey	·	1.2 km	MPC · JPL
565805	2017 FN_{140}	—	February 24, 2006	Mount Lemmon	Mount Lemmon Survey	·	750 m	MPC · JPL
565806	2017 FW_{140}	—	January 22, 2006	Mount Lemmon	Mount Lemmon Survey	·	700 m	MPC · JPL
565807	2017 FN_{141}	—	March 19, 2013	Haleakala	Pan-STARRS 1	·	810 m	MPC · JPL
565808	2017 FM_{142}	—	April 13, 2013	Mount Lemmon	Mount Lemmon Survey	·	1.7 km	MPC · JPL
565809	2017 FW_{145}	—	December 29, 2008	Kitt Peak	Spacewatch	·	1.6 km	MPC · JPL
565810	2017 FN_{146}	—	April 19, 2013	Mount Lemmon	Mount Lemmon Survey	·	1.7 km	MPC · JPL
565811	2017 FN_{147}	—	February 22, 2017	Mount Lemmon	Mount Lemmon Survey	PHO	670 m	MPC · JPL
565812	2017 FC_{150}	—	November 2, 2010	Mount Lemmon	Mount Lemmon Survey	·	910 m	MPC · JPL
565813	2017 FF_{150}	—	August 31, 2005	Kitt Peak	Spacewatch	·	1.5 km	MPC · JPL
565814	2017 FV_{151}	—	March 13, 2013	Haleakala	Pan-STARRS 1	(5)	1.1 km	MPC · JPL
565815	2017 FJ_{152}	—	December 3, 2015	Mount Lemmon	Mount Lemmon Survey	·	890 m	MPC · JPL
565816	2017 FL_{153}	—	October 23, 2011	Mount Lemmon	Mount Lemmon Survey	·	1.2 km	MPC · JPL
565817	2017 FK_{154}	—	January 18, 2013	Kitt Peak	Spacewatch	V	740 m	MPC · JPL
565818	2017 FQ_{155}	—	October 29, 2010	Mount Lemmon	Mount Lemmon Survey	·	1.9 km	MPC · JPL
565819	2017 FY_{155}	—	November 2, 2011	Kitt Peak	Spacewatch	·	1.1 km	MPC · JPL
565820	2017 FA_{156}	—	February 18, 2013	Mount Lemmon	Mount Lemmon Survey	·	1.5 km	MPC · JPL
565821	2017 FU_{156}	—	January 10, 2013	Kitt Peak	Spacewatch	·	1.2 km	MPC · JPL
565822	2017 FL_{157}	—	April 16, 2004	Kitt Peak	Spacewatch	·	1.4 km	MPC · JPL
565823	2017 FO_{157}	—	April 22, 2009	Mount Lemmon	Mount Lemmon Survey	·	1.2 km	MPC · JPL
565824	2017 FN_{158}	—	February 3, 2013	Haleakala	Pan-STARRS 1	PHO	610 m	MPC · JPL
565825	2017 FC_{159}	—	January 16, 2016	Haleakala	Pan-STARRS 1	·	2.3 km	MPC · JPL
565826	2017 FG_{159}	—	April 21, 2006	Kitt Peak	Spacewatch	·	1.5 km	MPC · JPL
565827	2017 FV_{159}	—	May 31, 2014	Haleakala	Pan-STARRS 1	·	1.2 km	MPC · JPL
565828	2017 FD_{160}	—	August 4, 2014	Haleakala	Pan-STARRS 1	·	870 m	MPC · JPL
565829	2017 FQ_{160}	—	March 31, 2008	Mount Lemmon	Mount Lemmon Survey	·	1.8 km	MPC · JPL
565830	2017 FR_{160}	—	December 30, 2007	Mount Lemmon	Mount Lemmon Survey	·	1.0 km	MPC · JPL
565831	2017 FT_{160}	—	March 31, 2008	Mount Lemmon	Mount Lemmon Survey	·	1.6 km	MPC · JPL
565832	2017 FU_{160}	—	April 10, 2003	Kitt Peak	Spacewatch	(18466)	2.3 km	MPC · JPL
565833	2017 FA_{161}	—	April 15, 2013	Haleakala	Pan-STARRS 1	·	1.6 km	MPC · JPL
565834	2017 FF_{161}	—	September 18, 2006	Kitt Peak	Spacewatch	·	980 m	MPC · JPL
565835	2017 FG_{161}	—	April 28, 2001	Kitt Peak	Spacewatch	·	1.0 km	MPC · JPL
565836	2017 FK_{161}	—	January 18, 2008	Mount Lemmon	Mount Lemmon Survey	ADE	1.9 km	MPC · JPL
565837	2017 FW_{161}	—	December 8, 2015	Haleakala	Pan-STARRS 1	·	1.4 km	MPC · JPL
565838	2017 FY_{162}	—	October 11, 2010	Mount Lemmon	Mount Lemmon Survey	·	1.8 km	MPC · JPL
565839	2017 GN	—	February 14, 2009	Mount Lemmon	Mount Lemmon Survey	MAS	740 m	MPC · JPL
565840	2017 GR	—	July 28, 2014	Haleakala	Pan-STARRS 1	MAR	800 m	MPC · JPL
565841	2017 GG_{2}	—	May 10, 2013	Nogales	M. Schwartz, P. R. Holvorcem	·	1.9 km	MPC · JPL
565842	2017 GN_{3}	—	December 23, 2012	Haleakala	Pan-STARRS 1	NYS	820 m	MPC · JPL
565843	2017 GU_{3}	—	September 15, 2006	Kitt Peak	Spacewatch	·	1.6 km	MPC · JPL
565844	2017 GA_{4}	—	December 8, 2015	Haleakala	Pan-STARRS 1	MAR	650 m	MPC · JPL
565845	2017 GK_{8}	—	February 23, 2012	Kitt Peak	Spacewatch	·	2.0 km	MPC · JPL
565846	2017 GL_{8}	—	January 19, 2012	Haleakala	Pan-STARRS 1	·	2.2 km	MPC · JPL
565847	2017 GS_{8}	—	November 1, 2011	Mount Lemmon	Mount Lemmon Survey	·	1.5 km	MPC · JPL
565848	2017 GB_{9}	—	October 1, 2005	Mount Lemmon	Mount Lemmon Survey	·	1.5 km	MPC · JPL
565849	2017 GC_{9}	—	November 4, 2005	Mount Lemmon	Mount Lemmon Survey	·	2.4 km	MPC · JPL
565850	2017 GJ_{9}	—	May 11, 2008	Mount Lemmon	Mount Lemmon Survey	·	1.8 km	MPC · JPL
565851	2017 GP_{9}	—	December 29, 2011	Mount Lemmon	Mount Lemmon Survey	·	1.2 km	MPC · JPL
565852	2017 GQ_{9}	—	June 3, 2013	Kitt Peak	Spacewatch	·	1.3 km	MPC · JPL
565853	2017 GD_{10}	—	May 3, 2008	Mount Lemmon	Mount Lemmon Survey	·	1.8 km	MPC · JPL
565854	2017 GO_{10}	—	April 22, 2004	Kitt Peak	Spacewatch	·	1.5 km	MPC · JPL
565855	2017 GP_{10}	—	September 10, 2010	Mount Lemmon	Mount Lemmon Survey	·	1.7 km	MPC · JPL
565856	2017 GT_{10}	—	December 3, 2015	Mount Lemmon	Mount Lemmon Survey	·	2.2 km	MPC · JPL
565857	2017 GY_{12}	—	March 22, 2004	Nogales	P. R. Holvorcem, M. Schwartz	BAR	810 m	MPC · JPL
565858	2017 GZ_{19}	—	April 1, 2017	Haleakala	Pan-STARRS 1	·	1.5 km	MPC · JPL
565859	2017 HT_{5}	—	August 27, 2006	Kitt Peak	Spacewatch	·	1.2 km	MPC · JPL
565860	2017 HU_{5}	—	November 18, 2007	Mount Lemmon	Mount Lemmon Survey	·	1.2 km	MPC · JPL
565861	2017 HZ_{5}	—	January 29, 2011	Haleakala	Pan-STARRS 1	·	1.9 km	MPC · JPL
565862	2017 HC_{6}	—	May 1, 2005	Kitt Peak	Spacewatch	·	1.5 km	MPC · JPL
565863	2017 HA_{7}	—	September 12, 2015	Haleakala	Pan-STARRS 1	·	880 m	MPC · JPL
565864	2017 HH_{7}	—	November 14, 2007	Mount Lemmon	Mount Lemmon Survey	·	990 m	MPC · JPL
565865	2017 HV_{7}	—	April 17, 2013	Haleakala	Pan-STARRS 1	·	1.6 km	MPC · JPL
565866	2017 HW_{7}	—	September 23, 2011	Haleakala	Pan-STARRS 1	V	660 m	MPC · JPL
565867	2017 HD_{8}	—	October 10, 2015	Haleakala	Pan-STARRS 1	V	570 m	MPC · JPL
565868	2017 HF_{8}	—	May 14, 2009	Kitt Peak	Spacewatch	·	1.1 km	MPC · JPL
565869	2017 HL_{8}	—	October 9, 2015	Haleakala	Pan-STARRS 1	·	960 m	MPC · JPL
565870	2017 HM_{8}	—	September 12, 2007	Catalina	CSS	·	1.3 km	MPC · JPL
565871	2017 HT_{9}	—	April 10, 2013	Kitt Peak	Spacewatch	·	1.1 km	MPC · JPL
565872	2017 HG_{10}	—	December 30, 2007	Kitt Peak	Spacewatch	·	1.1 km	MPC · JPL
565873	2017 HM_{10}	—	January 21, 2012	Catalina	CSS	·	1.9 km	MPC · JPL
565874	2017 HP_{10}	—	June 26, 2014	Haleakala	Pan-STARRS 1	PHO	1.0 km	MPC · JPL
565875	2017 HR_{10}	—	May 15, 2013	Haleakala	Pan-STARRS 1	·	1.6 km	MPC · JPL
565876	2017 HT_{10}	—	September 20, 2006	Palomar	NEAT	·	1.6 km	MPC · JPL
565877	2017 HC_{11}	—	November 24, 2003	Kitt Peak	Spacewatch	·	800 m	MPC · JPL
565878	2017 HE_{11}	—	May 12, 2010	Kitt Peak	Spacewatch	V	480 m	MPC · JPL
565879	2017 HT_{11}	—	May 23, 2001	Apache Point	SDSS Collaboration	·	1.2 km	MPC · JPL
565880	2017 HW_{11}	—	August 25, 2014	Haleakala	Pan-STARRS 1	·	2.0 km	MPC · JPL
565881	2017 HX_{11}	—	April 10, 2013	Haleakala	Pan-STARRS 1	MAR	1.2 km	MPC · JPL
565882	2017 HO_{12}	—	September 11, 2010	Mount Lemmon	Mount Lemmon Survey	·	1.6 km	MPC · JPL
565883	2017 HQ_{12}	—	March 2, 2008	Kitt Peak	Spacewatch	·	1.6 km	MPC · JPL
565884	2017 HS_{12}	—	August 25, 2014	Haleakala	Pan-STARRS 1	·	1.5 km	MPC · JPL
565885	2017 HJ_{13}	—	January 2, 2012	Mount Lemmon	Mount Lemmon Survey	·	1.6 km	MPC · JPL
565886	2017 HP_{13}	—	January 16, 2008	Mount Lemmon	Mount Lemmon Survey	·	1.4 km	MPC · JPL
565887	2017 HA_{14}	—	December 26, 2011	Kitt Peak	Spacewatch	·	1.0 km	MPC · JPL
565888	2017 HG_{14}	—	April 15, 2013	Haleakala	Pan-STARRS 1	·	1.4 km	MPC · JPL
565889	2017 HH_{14}	—	September 18, 2010	Mount Lemmon	Mount Lemmon Survey	(5)	1.4 km	MPC · JPL
565890	2017 HR_{14}	—	November 10, 2014	Haleakala	Pan-STARRS 1	·	2.0 km	MPC · JPL
565891	2017 HA_{15}	—	February 5, 2013	Kitt Peak	Spacewatch	·	950 m	MPC · JPL
565892	2017 HG_{15}	—	May 25, 2009	Kitt Peak	Spacewatch	·	980 m	MPC · JPL
565893	2017 HL_{15}	—	February 9, 2008	Mount Lemmon	Mount Lemmon Survey	(5)	1.3 km	MPC · JPL
565894	2017 HP_{15}	—	December 4, 2015	Haleakala	Pan-STARRS 1	KON	2.1 km	MPC · JPL
565895	2017 HD_{16}	—	May 16, 2013	Haleakala	Pan-STARRS 1	·	990 m	MPC · JPL
565896	2017 HN_{16}	—	February 26, 2008	Mount Lemmon	Mount Lemmon Survey	·	1.3 km	MPC · JPL
565897	2017 HV_{16}	—	November 17, 2014	Mount Lemmon	Mount Lemmon Survey	·	1.5 km	MPC · JPL
565898	2017 HE_{18}	—	March 26, 2008	Mount Lemmon	Mount Lemmon Survey	·	1.4 km	MPC · JPL
565899	2017 HH_{18}	—	November 12, 2001	Apache Point	SDSS Collaboration	·	1.7 km	MPC · JPL
565900	2017 HR_{18}	—	January 31, 2008	Catalina	CSS	EUN	1.7 km	MPC · JPL

== 565901–566000 ==
back to top

Designation			Discovery			Properties		Ref
Permanent	Provisional	Named after	Date	Site	Discoverer(s)	Category	Diam.	Ref
565901	2017 HT_{18}	—	February 22, 2017	Mount Lemmon	Mount Lemmon Survey	·	1.3 km	MPC · JPL
565902	2017 HC_{19}	—	November 18, 2015	Haleakala	Pan-STARRS 1	EUN	790 m	MPC · JPL
565903	2017 HS_{19}	—	December 5, 2007	Kitt Peak	Spacewatch	·	1.0 km	MPC · JPL
565904	2017 HW_{19}	—	May 14, 2005	Mount Lemmon	Mount Lemmon Survey	·	1.1 km	MPC · JPL
565905	2017 HY_{19}	—	January 22, 2012	Haleakala	Pan-STARRS 1	·	2.0 km	MPC · JPL
565906	2017 HE_{20}	—	March 31, 2013	Mount Lemmon	Mount Lemmon Survey	·	1.0 km	MPC · JPL
565907	2017 HF_{21}	—	April 16, 2013	Haleakala	Pan-STARRS 1	·	1.2 km	MPC · JPL
565908	2017 HN_{21}	—	April 15, 2013	Haleakala	Pan-STARRS 1	MAR	830 m	MPC · JPL
565909	2017 HM_{22}	—	April 29, 2009	Kitt Peak	Spacewatch	·	1.3 km	MPC · JPL
565910	2017 HT_{22}	—	February 2, 2008	Catalina	CSS	·	1.7 km	MPC · JPL
565911	2017 HX_{22}	—	October 22, 2014	Mount Lemmon	Mount Lemmon Survey	·	1.2 km	MPC · JPL
565912	2017 HA_{23}	—	December 31, 2007	Mount Lemmon	Mount Lemmon Survey	(1547)	1.4 km	MPC · JPL
565913	2017 HE_{23}	—	November 2, 2010	Mount Lemmon	Mount Lemmon Survey	·	1.7 km	MPC · JPL
565914	2017 HG_{23}	—	June 28, 2014	Haleakala	Pan-STARRS 1	·	930 m	MPC · JPL
565915	2017 HJ_{23}	—	April 11, 2005	Kitt Peak	Spacewatch	·	820 m	MPC · JPL
565916	2017 HB_{24}	—	March 22, 2004	Anderson Mesa	LONEOS	·	1.9 km	MPC · JPL
565917	2017 HD_{25}	—	November 5, 2010	Mount Lemmon	Mount Lemmon Survey	·	1.8 km	MPC · JPL
565918	2017 HH_{25}	—	April 15, 2013	Haleakala	Pan-STARRS 1	·	1.3 km	MPC · JPL
565919	2017 HM_{25}	—	September 25, 2009	Kitt Peak	Spacewatch	GEF	960 m	MPC · JPL
565920	2017 HW_{25}	—	April 1, 2017	Haleakala	Pan-STARRS 1	NEM	1.6 km	MPC · JPL
565921	2017 HC_{28}	—	September 16, 2004	Kitt Peak	Spacewatch	·	2.3 km	MPC · JPL
565922	2017 HQ_{28}	—	October 26, 2005	Kitt Peak	Spacewatch	HOF	2.2 km	MPC · JPL
565923	2017 HO_{31}	—	January 3, 2016	Haleakala	Pan-STARRS 1	NEM	1.8 km	MPC · JPL
565924	2017 HA_{32}	—	September 6, 2007	Siding Spring	SSS	·	4.1 km	MPC · JPL
565925	2017 HE_{32}	—	February 17, 2004	Kitt Peak	Spacewatch	RAF	930 m	MPC · JPL
565926	2017 HG_{34}	—	February 8, 1999	Kitt Peak	Spacewatch	·	1.7 km	MPC · JPL
565927	2017 HZ_{34}	—	January 7, 2016	Haleakala	Pan-STARRS 1	·	1.5 km	MPC · JPL
565928	2017 HE_{35}	—	November 21, 2014	Haleakala	Pan-STARRS 1	GEF	880 m	MPC · JPL
565929	2017 HP_{35}	—	August 20, 2014	Haleakala	Pan-STARRS 1	·	880 m	MPC · JPL
565930	2017 HM_{36}	—	November 18, 2003	Kitt Peak	Spacewatch	TIR	2.2 km	MPC · JPL
565931	2017 HQ_{36}	—	February 23, 2012	Mount Lemmon	Mount Lemmon Survey	·	1.3 km	MPC · JPL
565932	2017 HM_{37}	—	October 21, 2001	Kitt Peak	Spacewatch	·	1.6 km	MPC · JPL
565933	2017 HP_{39}	—	November 1, 2010	Mount Lemmon	Mount Lemmon Survey	·	1.3 km	MPC · JPL
565934	2017 HO_{40}	—	October 21, 2006	Mount Lemmon	Mount Lemmon Survey	·	1.2 km	MPC · JPL
565935	2017 HJ_{42}	—	November 16, 2006	Mount Lemmon	Mount Lemmon Survey	·	1.1 km	MPC · JPL
565936	2017 HL_{42}	—	September 12, 2009	Kitt Peak	Spacewatch	·	2.0 km	MPC · JPL
565937	2017 HD_{44}	—	April 14, 2004	Kitt Peak	Spacewatch	JUN	980 m	MPC · JPL
565938	2017 HS_{44}	—	December 13, 2006	Mount Lemmon	Mount Lemmon Survey	·	1.4 km	MPC · JPL
565939	2017 HW_{44}	—	August 18, 2009	Kitt Peak	Spacewatch	·	1.6 km	MPC · JPL
565940	2017 HY_{45}	—	March 22, 2012	Mount Lemmon	Mount Lemmon Survey	·	2.0 km	MPC · JPL
565941	2017 HD_{47}	—	January 19, 2008	Mount Lemmon	Mount Lemmon Survey	EUN	1.5 km	MPC · JPL
565942	2017 HS_{47}	—	June 3, 2013	Kitt Peak	Spacewatch	·	890 m	MPC · JPL
565943	2017 HA_{48}	—	November 16, 2006	Kitt Peak	Spacewatch	·	2.3 km	MPC · JPL
565944	2017 HN_{48}	—	June 14, 2009	Mount Lemmon	Mount Lemmon Survey	·	1.4 km	MPC · JPL
565945	2017 HF_{50}	—	April 12, 2008	Kitt Peak	Spacewatch	EUN	1.1 km	MPC · JPL
565946	2017 HH_{56}	—	December 18, 2007	Mount Lemmon	Mount Lemmon Survey	(5)	1.0 km	MPC · JPL
565947	2017 HT_{61}	—	February 10, 2007	Catalina	CSS	·	3.0 km	MPC · JPL
565948	2017 HV_{61}	—	August 30, 2014	Haleakala	Pan-STARRS 1	·	1.8 km	MPC · JPL
565949	2017 HX_{61}	—	February 20, 2012	Haleakala	Pan-STARRS 1	EUN	1.1 km	MPC · JPL
565950	2017 HB_{62}	—	January 8, 2002	Kitt Peak	Spacewatch	·	1.9 km	MPC · JPL
565951	2017 HO_{62}	—	March 16, 2012	Kitt Peak	Spacewatch	·	1.7 km	MPC · JPL
565952	2017 HQ_{62}	—	October 30, 2014	Haleakala	Pan-STARRS 1	·	1.4 km	MPC · JPL
565953	2017 HU_{62}	—	December 12, 2014	Haleakala	Pan-STARRS 1	·	1.6 km	MPC · JPL
565954	2017 HC_{63}	—	April 26, 2017	Haleakala	Pan-STARRS 1	·	2.2 km	MPC · JPL
565955	2017 HT_{68}	—	April 26, 2017	Haleakala	Pan-STARRS 1	·	1.5 km	MPC · JPL
565956	2017 JO	—	March 28, 2012	Haleakala	Pan-STARRS 1	·	1.7 km	MPC · JPL
565957	2017 JG_{4}	—	June 30, 2005	Palomar	NEAT	·	1.3 km	MPC · JPL
565958	2017 JH_{4}	—	June 16, 2013	Mount Lemmon	Mount Lemmon Survey	·	2.2 km	MPC · JPL
565959	2017 JA_{5}	—	February 16, 2012	Haleakala	Pan-STARRS 1	·	1.7 km	MPC · JPL
565960	2017 JH_{5}	—	January 21, 2012	Kitt Peak	Spacewatch	·	1.7 km	MPC · JPL
565961	2017 JK_{5}	—	January 4, 2016	Haleakala	Pan-STARRS 1	MAR	920 m	MPC · JPL
565962	2017 JZ_{5}	—	May 6, 2005	Kitt Peak	Spacewatch	·	1.2 km	MPC · JPL
565963	2017 JG_{6}	—	June 8, 2013	Mount Lemmon	Mount Lemmon Survey	·	1.9 km	MPC · JPL
565964	2017 KG	—	November 14, 2010	Catalina	CSS	HNS	1.4 km	MPC · JPL
565965	2017 KN	—	May 8, 2013	Haleakala	Pan-STARRS 1	·	1.4 km	MPC · JPL
565966	2017 KO	—	April 13, 2004	Kitt Peak	Spacewatch	·	1.6 km	MPC · JPL
565967	2017 KS	—	April 25, 2004	Kitt Peak	Spacewatch	ADE	1.6 km	MPC · JPL
565968	2017 KU	—	November 14, 2007	Mount Lemmon	Mount Lemmon Survey	·	1.3 km	MPC · JPL
565969	2017 KH_{1}	—	August 23, 2014	Haleakala	Pan-STARRS 1	·	1.9 km	MPC · JPL
565970	2017 KK_{1}	—	April 7, 2008	Mount Lemmon	Mount Lemmon Survey	·	1.5 km	MPC · JPL
565971	2017 KN_{1}	—	August 31, 2005	Kitt Peak	Spacewatch	·	1.3 km	MPC · JPL
565972	2017 KZ_{1}	—	October 27, 2014	Haleakala	Pan-STARRS 1	·	1.7 km	MPC · JPL
565973	2017 KP_{5}	—	December 5, 2007	Kitt Peak	Spacewatch	HNS	1.1 km	MPC · JPL
565974	2017 KU_{5}	—	May 16, 2013	Haleakala	Pan-STARRS 1	(5)	1.5 km	MPC · JPL
565975	2017 KN_{7}	—	March 28, 2008	Mount Lemmon	Mount Lemmon Survey	·	1.4 km	MPC · JPL
565976	2017 KP_{8}	—	December 8, 2010	Kitt Peak	Spacewatch	PAD	1.7 km	MPC · JPL
565977	2017 KY_{8}	—	November 6, 2010	Mount Lemmon	Mount Lemmon Survey	HNS	1.1 km	MPC · JPL
565978	2017 KG_{9}	—	September 27, 2009	Kitt Peak	Spacewatch	·	1.7 km	MPC · JPL
565979	2017 KK_{9}	—	May 15, 2009	Kitt Peak	Spacewatch	·	1.4 km	MPC · JPL
565980	2017 KZ_{10}	—	November 12, 2010	Mount Lemmon	Mount Lemmon Survey	·	1.6 km	MPC · JPL
565981	2017 KB_{11}	—	January 11, 2008	Kitt Peak	Spacewatch	EUN	990 m	MPC · JPL
565982	2017 KC_{11}	—	December 18, 2015	Mount Lemmon	Mount Lemmon Survey	·	930 m	MPC · JPL
565983	2017 KL_{11}	—	December 18, 2007	Mount Lemmon	Mount Lemmon Survey	·	1.0 km	MPC · JPL
565984	2017 KO_{11}	—	September 16, 2003	Kitt Peak	Spacewatch	·	1.7 km	MPC · JPL
565985	2017 KX_{11}	—	October 3, 2014	Mount Lemmon	Mount Lemmon Survey	·	1.6 km	MPC · JPL
565986	2017 KH_{12}	—	June 7, 2013	Haleakala	Pan-STARRS 1	·	1.3 km	MPC · JPL
565987	2017 KV_{12}	—	March 7, 2008	Catalina	CSS	·	1.4 km	MPC · JPL
565988	2017 KX_{12}	—	October 31, 2006	Mount Lemmon	Mount Lemmon Survey	·	1.9 km	MPC · JPL
565989	2017 KB_{13}	—	June 7, 2013	Haleakala	Pan-STARRS 1	·	1.3 km	MPC · JPL
565990	2017 KM_{13}	—	October 25, 2005	Kitt Peak	Spacewatch	AGN	1.0 km	MPC · JPL
565991	2017 KJ_{14}	—	August 16, 2009	Kitt Peak	Spacewatch	WIT	980 m	MPC · JPL
565992	2017 KS_{14}	—	May 18, 2009	Mount Lemmon	Mount Lemmon Survey	MAR	1.2 km	MPC · JPL
565993	2017 KG_{15}	—	July 25, 2014	Haleakala	Pan-STARRS 1	·	1 km	MPC · JPL
565994	2017 KH_{15}	—	August 10, 2007	Kitt Peak	Spacewatch	VER	3.1 km	MPC · JPL
565995	2017 KQ_{15}	—	February 6, 2011	Les Engarouines	L. Bernasconi	·	2.5 km	MPC · JPL
565996	2017 KM_{16}	—	September 18, 2010	Mount Lemmon	Mount Lemmon Survey	·	1.4 km	MPC · JPL
565997	2017 KP_{16}	—	March 30, 2008	Kitt Peak	Spacewatch	·	1.2 km	MPC · JPL
565998	2017 KY_{16}	—	October 30, 2010	Mount Lemmon	Mount Lemmon Survey	·	1.7 km	MPC · JPL
565999	2017 KF_{17}	—	February 28, 2012	Haleakala	Pan-STARRS 1	·	1.3 km	MPC · JPL
566000	2017 KL_{18}	—	September 12, 2010	Mount Lemmon	Mount Lemmon Survey	·	1.1 km	MPC · JPL

back to top

== Meaning of names ==
As minor planet discoveries are confirmed, they are given a permanent number by the IAU's Minor Planet Center (MPC), and the discoverers can then submit names for them, following the IAU's naming conventions. The list below concerns those minor planets in the specified number-range that have received names, and explains the meanings of those names.

Official naming citations of newly named small Solar System bodies are approved and published in a bulletin by IAU's Working Group for Small Bodies Nomenclature (WGSBN). Before May 2021, citations were published in MPC's Minor Planet Circulars for many decades. Recent citations can also be found on the JPL Small-Body Database (SBDB). Until his death in 2016, German astronomer Lutz D. Schmadel compiled these citations into the Dictionary of Minor Planet Names (DMP) and regularly updated the collection.

Based on Paul Herget's The Names of the Minor Planets, Schmadel also researched the unclear origin of numerous asteroids, most of which had been named prior to World War II. This article incorporates text from this source, which is in the public domain: SBDB New namings may only be added to this list below after official publication as the preannouncement of names is condemned. The WGSBN publishes a comprehensive guideline for the naming rules of non-cometary small Solar System bodies.

Named minor planet	Provisional	This minor planet was named for...	Ref · Catalog
565039 Meganengel	2017 BK_{19}	Megan C. Engel, Canadian theoretical physicist at the Department of Biological Science of the University of Calgary.	IAU · 565039
565122 Markbowman	2017 BC_{82}	Mark Bowman, American science teacher.	IAU · 565122
565139 Sumshchyna	2017 BB_{95}	Named in honor of the people living in the industrial region of Sumschyna, Sumy Oblast, Ukraine	IAU · 565139
565184 Janusz	2017 BK_{129}	Robert M. Janusz (born 1964), a Polish Jesuit priest, philosopher and physicist noted for his studies of star clusters.	IAU · 565184
565571 Shtol	2017 EK_{21}	Victor Shtol (1936–2022), Russian design engineer who invented a unique spectropolarimeter, which enables precise polarisation measurements in narrow spectral regions.	IAU · 565571
565780 Kopaszimre	2017 FQ_{122}	Imre Kopasz (1938–2017), a teacher of physics and mathematics. He was a principal of a primary school in Pirtó, Hungary.	IAU · 565780
