= List of minor planets: 522001–523000 =

The following is a partial list of minor planets, running from minor-planet number 522001 through 523000, inclusive. The primary data for this and other partial lists is based on JPL's "Small-Body Orbital Elements" and data available from the Minor Planet Center. Critical list information is also provided by the MPC, unless otherwise specified from Lowell Observatory. A detailed description of the table's columns and additional sources are given on the main page including a complete list of every page in this series, and a statistical break-up on the dynamical classification of minor planets.

Also see the summary list of all named bodies in numerical and alphabetical order, and the corresponding naming citations for the number range of this particular list. New namings may only be added to this list after official publication, as the preannouncement of names is condemned by the Working Group for Small Bodies Nomenclature of the International Astronomical Union.

Near-Earth obj.	MBA (inner)	MBA (outer)	Centaur
Mars-crosser	MBA (middle)	Jupiter trojan	Trans-Neptunian obj.
Unclassified

== 522001–522100 ==
Designation			Discovery			Properties		Ref
Permanent	Provisional	Named after	Date	Site	Discoverer(s)	Category	Diam.	Ref
522001	2015 XS_{79}	—	May 25, 2010	WISE	WISE	·	3.1 km	MPC · JPL
522002	2015 XN_{92}	—	January 3, 2011	Mount Lemmon	Mount Lemmon Survey	EOS	1.7 km	MPC · JPL
522003	2015 XD_{117}	—	December 2, 2010	Mount Lemmon	Mount Lemmon Survey	NAE	2.2 km	MPC · JPL
522004	2015 XY_{132}	—	December 27, 2006	Mount Lemmon	Mount Lemmon Survey	KOR	1.2 km	MPC · JPL
522005	2015 XT_{133}	—	August 30, 2005	Kitt Peak	Spacewatch	AST	1.5 km	MPC · JPL
522006	2015 XH_{135}	—	August 19, 2006	Kitt Peak	Spacewatch	·	1.3 km	MPC · JPL
522007	2015 XV_{143}	—	September 27, 2009	Mount Lemmon	Mount Lemmon Survey	·	2.4 km	MPC · JPL
522008	2015 XK_{166}	—	September 30, 2010	Mount Lemmon	Mount Lemmon Survey	·	1.6 km	MPC · JPL
522009	2015 XS_{188}	—	March 23, 2012	Catalina	CSS	TIR	3.3 km	MPC · JPL
522010	2015 XW_{198}	—	October 24, 2015	Mount Lemmon	Mount Lemmon Survey	EOS	1.8 km	MPC · JPL
522011	2015 XJ_{220}	—	December 19, 2004	Mount Lemmon	Mount Lemmon Survey	EOS	2.1 km	MPC · JPL
522012	2015 XO_{234}	—	October 24, 2009	Kitt Peak	Spacewatch	VER	2.4 km	MPC · JPL
522013	2015 XF_{237}	—	August 28, 2014	Haleakala	Pan-STARRS 1	·	1.9 km	MPC · JPL
522014	2015 XA_{238}	—	December 28, 2005	Mount Lemmon	Mount Lemmon Survey	·	2.5 km	MPC · JPL
522015	2015 XW_{268}	—	October 30, 2005	Mount Lemmon	Mount Lemmon Survey	·	2.1 km	MPC · JPL
522016	2015 XW_{309}	—	November 3, 2004	Kitt Peak	Spacewatch	·	2.2 km	MPC · JPL
522017	2015 XN_{352}	—	August 20, 2014	Haleakala	Pan-STARRS 1	CYB	3.1 km	MPC · JPL
522018	2015 XJ_{394}	—	August 30, 2014	Mount Lemmon	Mount Lemmon Survey	·	2.6 km	MPC · JPL
522019	2015 XZ_{394}	—	November 25, 2005	Kitt Peak	Spacewatch	KOR	1.3 km	MPC · JPL
522020	2015 XG_{395}	—	March 15, 2012	Mount Lemmon	Mount Lemmon Survey	·	2.6 km	MPC · JPL
522021	2015 XK_{404}	—	May 13, 2009	Kitt Peak	Spacewatch	·	2.6 km	MPC · JPL
522022	2015 XL_{404}	—	December 22, 2003	Kitt Peak	Spacewatch	(5)	1.1 km	MPC · JPL
522023	2015 XM_{404}	—	February 20, 2012	Haleakala	Pan-STARRS 1	·	1.8 km	MPC · JPL
522024	2015 XZ_{404}	—	April 22, 2012	Kitt Peak	Spacewatch	EOS	1.7 km	MPC · JPL
522025	2015 XD_{405}	—	August 29, 2014	Mount Lemmon	Mount Lemmon Survey	·	2.5 km	MPC · JPL
522026	2015 XJ_{405}	—	February 10, 2008	Catalina	CSS	·	1.5 km	MPC · JPL
522027	2015 XK_{405}	—	December 29, 2011	Mount Lemmon	Mount Lemmon Survey	·	1.4 km	MPC · JPL
522028	2015 XU_{405}	—	April 28, 2007	Kitt Peak	Spacewatch	·	2.7 km	MPC · JPL
522029	2015 XE_{406}	—	March 8, 2008	Catalina	CSS	EUN	1.2 km	MPC · JPL
522030	2015 XN_{407}	—	September 30, 2006	Kitt Peak	Spacewatch	·	2.9 km	MPC · JPL
522031	2015 XS_{407}	—	February 10, 2011	Catalina	CSS	·	3.2 km	MPC · JPL
522032	2015 XG_{408}	—	August 27, 2014	Haleakala	Pan-STARRS 1	·	2.6 km	MPC · JPL
522033	2015 XN_{408}	—	January 13, 2011	Mount Lemmon	Mount Lemmon Survey	·	2.5 km	MPC · JPL
522034	2015 XQ_{408}	—	March 13, 2007	Mount Lemmon	Mount Lemmon Survey	·	1.7 km	MPC · JPL
522035	2015 XS_{408}	—	October 1, 2014	Haleakala	Pan-STARRS 1	·	2.2 km	MPC · JPL
522036	2015 XX_{408}	—	August 28, 2006	Kitt Peak	Spacewatch	·	1.1 km	MPC · JPL
522037	2015 XW_{409}	—	March 26, 2006	Mount Lemmon	Mount Lemmon Survey	EOS	1.7 km	MPC · JPL
522038	2015 XH_{410}	—	October 30, 2014	Kitt Peak	Spacewatch	·	1.9 km	MPC · JPL
522039	2015 XQ_{410}	—	November 5, 2010	Mount Lemmon	Mount Lemmon Survey	·	1.9 km	MPC · JPL
522040	2015 XS_{410}	—	November 20, 2006	Kitt Peak	Spacewatch	·	1.1 km	MPC · JPL
522041	2015 XX_{410}	—	March 18, 2009	Kitt Peak	Spacewatch	NYS	950 m	MPC · JPL
522042	2015 XA_{411}	—	September 19, 2009	Kitt Peak	Spacewatch	THM	2.0 km	MPC · JPL
522043	2015 XJ_{412}	—	September 21, 2009	Kitt Peak	Spacewatch	·	1.8 km	MPC · JPL
522044	2015 XS_{412}	—	October 24, 2005	Kitt Peak	Spacewatch	·	2.1 km	MPC · JPL
522045	2015 XZ_{412}	—	March 14, 2011	Mount Lemmon	Mount Lemmon Survey	TIR	2.4 km	MPC · JPL
522046	2015 XU_{413}	—	April 4, 2008	Kitt Peak	Spacewatch	AGN	1.0 km	MPC · JPL
522047	2015 XX_{413}	—	November 11, 2004	Kitt Peak	Spacewatch	·	2.6 km	MPC · JPL
522048	2015 XE_{414}	—	February 29, 2012	Kitt Peak	Spacewatch	·	1.3 km	MPC · JPL
522049	2015 XH_{414}	—	September 8, 2013	Haleakala	Pan-STARRS 1	·	3.7 km	MPC · JPL
522050	2015 XJ_{414}	—	April 2, 2011	Mount Lemmon	Mount Lemmon Survey	·	2.3 km	MPC · JPL
522051	2015 XL_{414}	—	October 13, 2010	Mount Lemmon	Mount Lemmon Survey	·	1.5 km	MPC · JPL
522052	2015 XY_{414}	—	August 9, 2013	Kitt Peak	Spacewatch	·	3.0 km	MPC · JPL
522053	2015 XB_{415}	—	December 13, 2006	Kitt Peak	Spacewatch	·	1.7 km	MPC · JPL
522054	2015 XL_{415}	—	December 1, 2005	Kitt Peak	Spacewatch	·	1.8 km	MPC · JPL
522055	2015 XN_{415}	—	January 13, 2005	Kitt Peak	Spacewatch	·	2.2 km	MPC · JPL
522056	2015 XO_{415}	—	December 4, 2007	Kitt Peak	Spacewatch	·	1.3 km	MPC · JPL
522057	2015 XQ_{415}	—	April 20, 2006	Kitt Peak	Spacewatch	·	2.8 km	MPC · JPL
522058	2015 XS_{415}	—	December 12, 2006	Kitt Peak	Spacewatch	·	1.3 km	MPC · JPL
522059	2015 XT_{415}	—	April 6, 2011	Mount Lemmon	Mount Lemmon Survey	·	2.8 km	MPC · JPL
522060	2015 XX_{415}	—	March 24, 2012	Catalina	CSS	·	1.9 km	MPC · JPL
522061	2015 XN_{416}	—	October 22, 2014	Kitt Peak	Spacewatch	·	1.9 km	MPC · JPL
522062	2015 XQ_{416}	—	March 12, 2008	Mount Lemmon	Mount Lemmon Survey	EUN	1.2 km	MPC · JPL
522063	2015 XP_{417}	—	November 4, 2004	Kitt Peak	Spacewatch	·	2.3 km	MPC · JPL
522064	2015 XU_{417}	—	October 26, 2009	Mount Lemmon	Mount Lemmon Survey	·	2.8 km	MPC · JPL
522065	2015 XV_{417}	—	April 5, 2011	Mount Lemmon	Mount Lemmon Survey	EOS	1.5 km	MPC · JPL
522066	2015 XW_{417}	—	April 3, 2011	Haleakala	Pan-STARRS 1	·	2.7 km	MPC · JPL
522067	2015 XA_{418}	—	March 12, 2008	Kitt Peak	Spacewatch	MAR	930 m	MPC · JPL
522068	2015 XC_{418}	—	September 27, 2008	Mount Lemmon	Mount Lemmon Survey	·	2.3 km	MPC · JPL
522069	2015 XK_{418}	—	March 28, 2011	Mount Lemmon	Mount Lemmon Survey	·	1.9 km	MPC · JPL
522070	2015 XR_{418}	—	February 27, 2012	Haleakala	Pan-STARRS 1	·	1.3 km	MPC · JPL
522071	2015 XU_{418}	—	December 16, 2004	Kitt Peak	Spacewatch	·	1.9 km	MPC · JPL
522072	2015 XA_{419}	—	October 3, 2014	Mount Lemmon	Mount Lemmon Survey	·	1.1 km	MPC · JPL
522073	2015 XJ_{419}	—	June 23, 2009	Mount Lemmon	Mount Lemmon Survey	EUN	1.1 km	MPC · JPL
522074	2015 XO_{419}	—	December 28, 2005	Kitt Peak	Spacewatch	BRA	1.7 km	MPC · JPL
522075	2015 XT_{419}	—	January 16, 2005	Kitt Peak	Spacewatch	·	2.2 km	MPC · JPL
522076	2015 XZ_{419}	—	April 25, 2007	Kitt Peak	Spacewatch	·	1.5 km	MPC · JPL
522077	2015 XD_{420}	—	March 25, 2012	Catalina	CSS	·	1.6 km	MPC · JPL
522078	2015 XF_{420}	—	May 15, 2012	Haleakala	Pan-STARRS 1	·	1.9 km	MPC · JPL
522079	2015 XH_{420}	—	November 30, 2005	Mount Lemmon	Mount Lemmon Survey	·	2.1 km	MPC · JPL
522080	2015 XJ_{420}	—	February 27, 2012	Haleakala	Pan-STARRS 1	·	1.9 km	MPC · JPL
522081	2015 XA_{421}	—	January 25, 2011	Mount Lemmon	Mount Lemmon Survey	·	2.5 km	MPC · JPL
522082	2015 XL_{421}	—	March 17, 2012	Mount Lemmon	Mount Lemmon Survey	AEO	990 m	MPC · JPL
522083	2015 XM_{421}	—	January 26, 2012	Kitt Peak	Spacewatch	·	1.9 km	MPC · JPL
522084	2015 XN_{421}	—	October 25, 2009	Kitt Peak	Spacewatch	·	2.1 km	MPC · JPL
522085	2015 XO_{421}	—	December 5, 2010	Kitt Peak	Spacewatch	EOS	1.6 km	MPC · JPL
522086	2015 XP_{421}	—	November 28, 2011	Mount Lemmon	Mount Lemmon Survey	EUN	1.2 km	MPC · JPL
522087	2015 XQ_{421}	—	December 14, 2015	Haleakala	Pan-STARRS 1	T_{j} (2.98) · EUP	4.0 km	MPC · JPL
522088	2015 XR_{421}	—	September 14, 2014	Haleakala	Pan-STARRS 1	·	3.2 km	MPC · JPL
522089	2015 YY_{24}	—	December 30, 2008	Mount Lemmon	Mount Lemmon Survey	·	1.1 km	MPC · JPL
522090	2015 YZ_{24}	—	April 21, 2012	Haleakala	Pan-STARRS 1	·	2.3 km	MPC · JPL
522091	2015 YD_{25}	—	February 8, 2011	Mount Lemmon	Mount Lemmon Survey	·	2.4 km	MPC · JPL
522092	2015 YE_{25}	—	October 2, 2014	Catalina	CSS	·	2.6 km	MPC · JPL
522093	2015 YH_{25}	—	August 6, 2014	Haleakala	Pan-STARRS 1	·	1.8 km	MPC · JPL
522094	2015 YJ_{25}	—	December 25, 2010	Mount Lemmon	Mount Lemmon Survey	·	2.4 km	MPC · JPL
522095	2015 YM_{25}	—	January 10, 2007	Kitt Peak	Spacewatch	GEF	990 m	MPC · JPL
522096	2015 YM_{26}	—	December 11, 2010	Mount Lemmon	Mount Lemmon Survey	·	2.3 km	MPC · JPL
522097	2015 YO_{26}	—	April 17, 2013	Haleakala	Pan-STARRS 1	V	660 m	MPC · JPL
522098	2015 YQ_{26}	—	September 16, 2003	Kitt Peak	Spacewatch	·	2.1 km	MPC · JPL
522099	2015 YW_{26}	—	December 3, 2010	Mount Lemmon	Mount Lemmon Survey	MRX	920 m	MPC · JPL
522100	2015 YY_{26}	—	August 30, 2005	Kitt Peak	Spacewatch	·	1.9 km	MPC · JPL

== 522101–522200 ==
back to top

Designation			Discovery			Properties		Ref
Permanent	Provisional	Named after	Date	Site	Discoverer(s)	Category	Diam.	Ref
522101	2015 YD_{27}	—	November 19, 2009	Kitt Peak	Spacewatch	EOS	1.9 km	MPC · JPL
522102	2015 YE_{27}	—	September 19, 2014	Haleakala	Pan-STARRS 1	·	1.8 km	MPC · JPL
522103	2015 YG_{27}	—	April 8, 2008	Kitt Peak	Spacewatch	·	1.4 km	MPC · JPL
522104	2015 YL_{27}	—	February 4, 2012	Haleakala	Pan-STARRS 1	MAR	1.1 km	MPC · JPL
522105	2015 YN_{27}	—	January 7, 1994	Kitt Peak	Spacewatch	EOS	1.8 km	MPC · JPL
522106	2016 AC_{14}	—	March 9, 2010	WISE	WISE	·	3.4 km	MPC · JPL
522107	2016 AF_{216}	—	September 7, 2008	Mount Lemmon	Mount Lemmon Survey	·	3.4 km	MPC · JPL
522108	2016 AJ_{238}	—	October 24, 2009	Kitt Peak	Spacewatch	·	1.9 km	MPC · JPL
522109	2016 AN_{238}	—	September 29, 2014	Haleakala	Pan-STARRS 1	EOS	1.7 km	MPC · JPL
522110	2016 AS_{238}	—	November 1, 2005	Kitt Peak	Spacewatch	·	2.1 km	MPC · JPL
522111	2016 AA_{239}	—	March 29, 2012	Mount Lemmon	Mount Lemmon Survey	·	2.0 km	MPC · JPL
522112	2016 AK_{239}	—	November 1, 2007	Kitt Peak	Spacewatch	·	1.3 km	MPC · JPL
522113	2016 AY_{239}	—	October 7, 1994	Kitt Peak	Spacewatch	·	1.4 km	MPC · JPL
522114	2016 AC_{240}	—	January 25, 2011	Kitt Peak	Spacewatch	·	2.1 km	MPC · JPL
522115	2016 AD_{240}	—	February 12, 2012	Catalina	CSS	ADE	1.8 km	MPC · JPL
522116	2016 AN_{240}	—	April 13, 2008	Mount Lemmon	Mount Lemmon Survey	·	2.7 km	MPC · JPL
522117	2016 AQ_{240}	—	August 30, 2005	Kitt Peak	Spacewatch	·	1.8 km	MPC · JPL
522118	2016 AR_{240}	—	August 7, 2008	Kitt Peak	Spacewatch	·	2.4 km	MPC · JPL
522119	2016 AS_{240}	—	September 4, 2008	Kitt Peak	Spacewatch	EOS	2.1 km	MPC · JPL
522120	2016 AG_{241}	—	June 18, 2013	Haleakala	Pan-STARRS 1	·	3.0 km	MPC · JPL
522121	2016 AN_{241}	—	December 13, 2006	Kitt Peak	Spacewatch	·	1.5 km	MPC · JPL
522122	2016 AB_{242}	—	December 19, 2004	Mount Lemmon	Mount Lemmon Survey	·	880 m	MPC · JPL
522123	2016 AG_{242}	—	January 3, 2016	Haleakala	Pan-STARRS 1	·	1.3 km	MPC · JPL
522124	2016 AC_{243}	—	February 16, 2012	Haleakala	Pan-STARRS 1	·	1.6 km	MPC · JPL
522125	2016 AF_{243}	—	July 14, 2013	Haleakala	Pan-STARRS 1	EOS	1.7 km	MPC · JPL
522126	2016 AP_{243}	—	January 16, 2000	Kitt Peak	Spacewatch	·	2.0 km	MPC · JPL
522127	2016 AV_{243}	—	September 18, 2009	Kitt Peak	Spacewatch	KOR	1.2 km	MPC · JPL
522128	2016 AC_{244}	—	November 23, 2009	Kitt Peak	Spacewatch	THM	1.7 km	MPC · JPL
522129	2016 AS_{244}	—	January 26, 2007	Kitt Peak	Spacewatch	·	2.3 km	MPC · JPL
522130	2016 AG_{245}	—	June 18, 2013	Haleakala	Pan-STARRS 1	·	1.6 km	MPC · JPL
522131	2016 AN_{245}	—	January 31, 2006	Kitt Peak	Spacewatch	·	2.1 km	MPC · JPL
522132	2016 AR_{245}	—	September 29, 2014	Haleakala	Pan-STARRS 1	AGN	1.1 km	MPC · JPL
522133	2016 AW_{245}	—	July 15, 2013	Haleakala	Pan-STARRS 1	·	2.9 km	MPC · JPL
522134	2016 AX_{246}	—	March 27, 2011	Mount Lemmon	Mount Lemmon Survey	EOS	1.6 km	MPC · JPL
522135	2016 AZ_{246}	—	August 15, 2009	Kitt Peak	Spacewatch	MAR	1.4 km	MPC · JPL
522136	2016 AA_{247}	—	February 27, 2012	Haleakala	Pan-STARRS 1	·	1.1 km	MPC · JPL
522137	2016 AE_{247}	—	August 25, 2014	Haleakala	Pan-STARRS 1	PAD	1.4 km	MPC · JPL
522138	2016 AH_{247}	—	January 30, 2011	Mount Lemmon	Mount Lemmon Survey	·	2.1 km	MPC · JPL
522139	2016 AJ_{247}	—	January 15, 2008	Kitt Peak	Spacewatch	·	1.2 km	MPC · JPL
522140	2016 AU_{247}	—	November 1, 2010	Kitt Peak	Spacewatch	·	1.4 km	MPC · JPL
522141	2016 AV_{247}	—	February 10, 2011	Mount Lemmon	Mount Lemmon Survey	TIR	2.2 km	MPC · JPL
522142	2016 AC_{248}	—	February 25, 2007	Mount Lemmon	Mount Lemmon Survey	·	1.5 km	MPC · JPL
522143	2016 AG_{248}	—	March 15, 2012	Mount Lemmon	Mount Lemmon Survey	·	1.4 km	MPC · JPL
522144	2016 AW_{248}	—	September 23, 2008	Mount Lemmon	Mount Lemmon Survey	VER	2.4 km	MPC · JPL
522145	2016 AG_{249}	—	May 15, 2008	Kitt Peak	Spacewatch	·	1.4 km	MPC · JPL
522146	2016 AH_{249}	—	November 8, 2009	Kitt Peak	Spacewatch	·	3.0 km	MPC · JPL
522147	2016 AY_{249}	—	October 28, 2005	Kitt Peak	Spacewatch	HOF	2.2 km	MPC · JPL
522148	2016 AH_{250}	—	October 23, 2009	Kitt Peak	Spacewatch	·	1.9 km	MPC · JPL
522149	2016 AS_{250}	—	June 13, 2004	Kitt Peak	Spacewatch	·	2.1 km	MPC · JPL
522150	2016 AZ_{250}	—	February 14, 2005	Kitt Peak	Spacewatch	·	3.2 km	MPC · JPL
522151	2016 AF_{251}	—	July 6, 2005	Kitt Peak	Spacewatch	·	1.0 km	MPC · JPL
522152	2016 AJ_{251}	—	May 1, 2004	Kitt Peak	Spacewatch	·	1.8 km	MPC · JPL
522153	2016 AP_{251}	—	February 1, 2008	Mount Lemmon	Mount Lemmon Survey	·	1.1 km	MPC · JPL
522154	2016 AR_{251}	—	January 28, 2011	Mount Lemmon	Mount Lemmon Survey	EOS	1.5 km	MPC · JPL
522155	2016 AU_{251}	—	September 24, 2008	Mount Lemmon	Mount Lemmon Survey	·	3.1 km	MPC · JPL
522156	2016 AX_{251}	—	April 14, 2008	Kitt Peak	Spacewatch	·	1.3 km	MPC · JPL
522157	2016 AF_{252}	—	October 2, 2003	Kitt Peak	Spacewatch	·	3.2 km	MPC · JPL
522158	2016 AG_{252}	—	December 1, 2008	Kitt Peak	Spacewatch	·	650 m	MPC · JPL
522159	2016 AS_{252}	—	December 6, 2011	Haleakala	Pan-STARRS 1	·	960 m	MPC · JPL
522160	2016 AD_{253}	—	November 7, 2010	Mount Lemmon	Mount Lemmon Survey	·	1.4 km	MPC · JPL
522161	2016 AH_{253}	—	October 26, 2005	Kitt Peak	Spacewatch	·	1.4 km	MPC · JPL
522162	2016 AL_{253}	—	December 28, 2011	Kitt Peak	Spacewatch	·	980 m	MPC · JPL
522163	2016 AO_{253}	—	March 6, 2011	Mount Lemmon	Mount Lemmon Survey	NAE	1.8 km	MPC · JPL
522164	2016 AY_{253}	—	April 21, 2012	Mount Lemmon	Mount Lemmon Survey	·	2.8 km	MPC · JPL
522165	2016 AL_{254}	—	April 1, 2008	Kitt Peak	Spacewatch	HOF	2.4 km	MPC · JPL
522166	2016 AT_{254}	—	June 13, 2012	Mount Lemmon	Mount Lemmon Survey	·	2.5 km	MPC · JPL
522167	2016 AC_{255}	—	November 7, 2007	Kitt Peak	Spacewatch	·	820 m	MPC · JPL
522168	2016 AM_{255}	—	June 18, 2013	Haleakala	Pan-STARRS 1	EOS	1.7 km	MPC · JPL
522169	2016 AT_{255}	—	April 7, 2007	Mount Lemmon	Mount Lemmon Survey	KOR	1.1 km	MPC · JPL
522170	2016 AV_{255}	—	September 24, 2014	Kitt Peak	Spacewatch	KOR	1.2 km	MPC · JPL
522171	2016 AX_{255}	—	March 11, 2011	Kitt Peak	Spacewatch	·	2.5 km	MPC · JPL
522172	2016 AY_{255}	—	October 21, 2014	Kitt Peak	Spacewatch	·	2.3 km	MPC · JPL
522173	2016 AC_{256}	—	January 15, 2008	Kitt Peak	Spacewatch	·	980 m	MPC · JPL
522174	2016 AF_{256}	—	September 6, 2014	Mount Lemmon	Mount Lemmon Survey	VER	2.4 km	MPC · JPL
522175	2016 AQ_{256}	—	January 26, 2011	Kitt Peak	Spacewatch	·	1.5 km	MPC · JPL
522176	2016 AS_{256}	—	January 15, 2005	Kitt Peak	Spacewatch	HYG	2.3 km	MPC · JPL
522177	2016 AY_{256}	—	December 26, 2009	Kitt Peak	Spacewatch	·	2.9 km	MPC · JPL
522178	2016 AF_{257}	—	September 15, 2009	Kitt Peak	Spacewatch	·	1.6 km	MPC · JPL
522179	2016 AH_{257}	—	April 21, 2012	Mount Lemmon	Mount Lemmon Survey	·	3.3 km	MPC · JPL
522180	2016 AK_{257}	—	November 1, 2006	Kitt Peak	Spacewatch	·	1.1 km	MPC · JPL
522181	2016 AP_{257}	—	November 27, 2009	Kitt Peak	Spacewatch	EOS	1.5 km	MPC · JPL
522182	2016 AQ_{257}	—	December 17, 2009	Kitt Peak	Spacewatch	·	2.4 km	MPC · JPL
522183	2016 AR_{257}	—	March 25, 2012	Mount Lemmon	Mount Lemmon Survey	·	1.4 km	MPC · JPL
522184	2016 AU_{257}	—	November 27, 2006	Kitt Peak	Spacewatch	·	1.2 km	MPC · JPL
522185	2016 AB_{258}	—	November 7, 2010	Kitt Peak	Spacewatch	·	1.5 km	MPC · JPL
522186	2016 AJ_{258}	—	January 19, 2012	Haleakala	Pan-STARRS 1	·	1.5 km	MPC · JPL
522187	2016 AK_{258}	—	March 14, 2011	Mount Lemmon	Mount Lemmon Survey	THM	1.8 km	MPC · JPL
522188	2016 AA_{259}	—	January 28, 2007	Mount Lemmon	Mount Lemmon Survey	·	1.7 km	MPC · JPL
522189	2016 AN_{259}	—	April 21, 2013	Mount Lemmon	Mount Lemmon Survey	·	660 m	MPC · JPL
522190	2016 AO_{259}	—	July 27, 2009	Catalina	CSS	EUN	1.2 km	MPC · JPL
522191	2016 AY_{259}	—	February 21, 2007	Mount Lemmon	Mount Lemmon Survey	·	1.6 km	MPC · JPL
522192	2016 AE_{260}	—	February 23, 2007	Mount Lemmon	Mount Lemmon Survey	AGN	970 m	MPC · JPL
522193	2016 AG_{260}	—	March 28, 2012	Haleakala	Pan-STARRS 1	·	1.3 km	MPC · JPL
522194	2016 AU_{260}	—	January 17, 2007	Kitt Peak	Spacewatch	EUN	1.1 km	MPC · JPL
522195	2016 AX_{260}	—	November 25, 2005	Kitt Peak	Spacewatch	·	2.2 km	MPC · JPL
522196	2016 AY_{260}	—	November 7, 2008	Mount Lemmon	Mount Lemmon Survey	·	2.5 km	MPC · JPL
522197	2016 AC_{261}	—	March 26, 2011	Mount Lemmon	Mount Lemmon Survey	·	2.6 km	MPC · JPL
522198	2016 AM_{261}	—	October 28, 2008	Kitt Peak	Spacewatch	·	2.9 km	MPC · JPL
522199	2016 AO_{261}	—	October 13, 2013	Mount Lemmon	Mount Lemmon Survey	·	2.2 km	MPC · JPL
522200	2016 AC_{262}	—	December 22, 2008	Mount Lemmon	Mount Lemmon Survey	·	560 m	MPC · JPL

== 522201–522300 ==
back to top

Designation			Discovery			Properties		Ref
Permanent	Provisional	Named after	Date	Site	Discoverer(s)	Category	Diam.	Ref
522201	2016 AD_{262}	—	February 23, 2012	Kitt Peak	Spacewatch	·	760 m	MPC · JPL
522202	2016 AH_{262}	—	January 8, 2016	Haleakala	Pan-STARRS 1	·	2.5 km	MPC · JPL
522203	2016 AJ_{262}	—	August 25, 2004	Kitt Peak	Spacewatch	·	1.9 km	MPC · JPL
522204	2016 AS_{262}	—	November 28, 2005	Kitt Peak	Spacewatch	·	2.1 km	MPC · JPL
522205	2016 AT_{262}	—	July 18, 2012	Catalina	CSS	·	3.5 km	MPC · JPL
522206	2016 AU_{262}	—	March 10, 2008	Kitt Peak	Spacewatch	·	1.1 km	MPC · JPL
522207	2016 AX_{262}	—	November 7, 2008	Mount Lemmon	Mount Lemmon Survey	·	2.2 km	MPC · JPL
522208	2016 AZ_{262}	—	November 17, 2014	Haleakala	Pan-STARRS 1	·	1.0 km	MPC · JPL
522209	2016 AD_{263}	—	February 27, 2012	Haleakala	Pan-STARRS 1	·	1.2 km	MPC · JPL
522210	2016 AE_{263}	—	July 29, 2008	Mount Lemmon	Mount Lemmon Survey	·	1.6 km	MPC · JPL
522211	2016 AK_{263}	—	February 8, 2011	Mount Lemmon	Mount Lemmon Survey	·	2.1 km	MPC · JPL
522212	2016 AO_{263}	—	January 17, 2007	Kitt Peak	Spacewatch	EUN	1.1 km	MPC · JPL
522213	2016 AP_{263}	—	August 25, 2012	Catalina	CSS	·	3.1 km	MPC · JPL
522214	2016 AQ_{263}	—	September 7, 2004	Kitt Peak	Spacewatch	AGN	1.3 km	MPC · JPL
522215	2016 AR_{263}	—	February 9, 2007	Kitt Peak	Spacewatch	EUN	1.3 km	MPC · JPL
522216	2016 AS_{263}	—	March 17, 2012	Kitt Peak	Spacewatch	·	1.1 km	MPC · JPL
522217	2016 AT_{263}	—	December 31, 2007	Kitt Peak	Spacewatch	NYS	950 m	MPC · JPL
522218	2016 AV_{263}	—	April 7, 2005	Kitt Peak	Spacewatch	THM	2.0 km	MPC · JPL
522219	2016 AW_{263}	—	December 17, 2007	Kitt Peak	Spacewatch	·	1.3 km	MPC · JPL
522220	2016 AG_{264}	—	March 1, 2008	Kitt Peak	Spacewatch	EUN	980 m	MPC · JPL
522221	2016 AO_{264}	—	January 27, 2012	Mount Lemmon	Mount Lemmon Survey	·	1.1 km	MPC · JPL
522222	2016 AR_{264}	—	January 19, 2012	Kitt Peak	Spacewatch	·	1.4 km	MPC · JPL
522223	2016 AB_{265}	—	June 13, 2007	Kitt Peak	Spacewatch	·	2.4 km	MPC · JPL
522224	2016 AM_{265}	—	November 16, 2006	Mount Lemmon	Mount Lemmon Survey	EUN	1.1 km	MPC · JPL
522225	2016 AQ_{265}	—	March 26, 2011	Kitt Peak	Spacewatch	URS	3.3 km	MPC · JPL
522226	2016 AV_{265}	—	May 15, 2012	Haleakala	Pan-STARRS 1	·	2.5 km	MPC · JPL
522227	2016 AA_{266}	—	November 11, 2010	Mount Lemmon	Mount Lemmon Survey	·	1.2 km	MPC · JPL
522228	2016 AQ_{266}	—	November 12, 2013	Kitt Peak	Spacewatch	·	3.8 km	MPC · JPL
522229	2016 AH_{267}	—	July 7, 2013	Kitt Peak	Spacewatch	·	3.2 km	MPC · JPL
522230	2016 AM_{267}	—	March 11, 2008	Kitt Peak	Spacewatch	·	1.1 km	MPC · JPL
522231	2016 AP_{267}	—	September 5, 2010	Mount Lemmon	Mount Lemmon Survey	·	1.4 km	MPC · JPL
522232	2016 AV_{267}	—	August 15, 2009	Catalina	CSS	·	2.2 km	MPC · JPL
522233	2016 AG_{268}	—	February 3, 2012	Mount Lemmon	Mount Lemmon Survey	HNS	1.4 km	MPC · JPL
522234	2016 AR_{269}	—	December 9, 2010	Mount Lemmon	Mount Lemmon Survey	MAR	1.3 km	MPC · JPL
522235	2016 AT_{269}	—	April 24, 2012	Haleakala	Pan-STARRS 1	(194)	1.6 km	MPC · JPL
522236	2016 AV_{269}	—	December 25, 2010	Mount Lemmon	Mount Lemmon Survey	·	1.3 km	MPC · JPL
522237	2016 AB_{270}	—	October 31, 2010	Mount Lemmon	Mount Lemmon Survey	·	970 m	MPC · JPL
522238	2016 AR_{270}	—	November 1, 2010	Piszkéstető	K. Sárneczky, Kuli, Z.	·	1.6 km	MPC · JPL
522239	2016 AL_{271}	—	March 6, 2008	Mount Lemmon	Mount Lemmon Survey	·	1.2 km	MPC · JPL
522240	2016 AO_{271}	—	January 29, 2007	Mount Lemmon	Mount Lemmon Survey	·	1.6 km	MPC · JPL
522241	2016 AP_{271}	—	December 23, 2014	Mount Lemmon	Mount Lemmon Survey	·	2.0 km	MPC · JPL
522242	2016 AF_{272}	—	November 17, 2006	Mount Lemmon	Mount Lemmon Survey	HNS	1.2 km	MPC · JPL
522243	2016 AM_{272}	—	October 25, 2014	Haleakala	Pan-STARRS 1	·	2.4 km	MPC · JPL
522244	2016 AO_{272}	—	September 3, 2008	Kitt Peak	Spacewatch	·	2.5 km	MPC · JPL
522245	2016 AT_{272}	—	April 2, 2006	Kitt Peak	Spacewatch	·	2.4 km	MPC · JPL
522246	2016 AA_{273}	—	September 20, 2014	Haleakala	Pan-STARRS 1	·	2.9 km	MPC · JPL
522247	2016 AG_{273}	—	August 25, 2012	Catalina	CSS	THB	2.9 km	MPC · JPL
522248	2016 AJ_{273}	—	October 23, 2006	Kitt Peak	Spacewatch	MAR	900 m	MPC · JPL
522249	2016 AK_{273}	—	May 2, 2006	Kitt Peak	Spacewatch	AEG	2.5 km	MPC · JPL
522250	2016 AP_{273}	—	October 9, 2005	Kitt Peak	Spacewatch	·	1.2 km	MPC · JPL
522251	2016 AQ_{273}	—	January 29, 2007	Kitt Peak	Spacewatch	·	2.1 km	MPC · JPL
522252	2016 AD_{274}	—	March 26, 2007	Mount Lemmon	Mount Lemmon Survey	·	1.7 km	MPC · JPL
522253	2016 AM_{274}	—	March 28, 2012	Kitt Peak	Spacewatch	PAD	1.2 km	MPC · JPL
522254	2016 AP_{274}	—	January 13, 2010	Mount Lemmon	Mount Lemmon Survey	·	2.4 km	MPC · JPL
522255	2016 AY_{274}	—	September 22, 2008	Mount Lemmon	Mount Lemmon Survey	·	1.6 km	MPC · JPL
522256	2016 AZ_{274}	—	August 14, 2013	Haleakala	Pan-STARRS 1	·	2.3 km	MPC · JPL
522257	2016 AD_{275}	—	February 22, 2007	Kitt Peak	Spacewatch	·	1.4 km	MPC · JPL
522258	2016 AE_{275}	—	January 27, 2012	Mount Lemmon	Mount Lemmon Survey	·	990 m	MPC · JPL
522259	2016 AG_{275}	—	November 20, 2014	Haleakala	Pan-STARRS 1	CYB	3.5 km	MPC · JPL
522260	2016 AL_{275}	—	January 12, 2011	Mount Lemmon	Mount Lemmon Survey	·	1.6 km	MPC · JPL
522261	2016 AT_{275}	—	May 21, 2012	Mount Lemmon	Mount Lemmon Survey	·	2.2 km	MPC · JPL
522262	2016 AV_{275}	—	January 19, 2012	Mount Lemmon	Mount Lemmon Survey	EUN	790 m	MPC · JPL
522263	2016 AY_{275}	—	February 12, 2008	Mount Lemmon	Mount Lemmon Survey	·	1.3 km	MPC · JPL
522264	2016 AA_{276}	—	February 26, 2012	Kitt Peak	Spacewatch	·	1.4 km	MPC · JPL
522265	2016 AC_{276}	—	November 21, 2005	Kitt Peak	Spacewatch	HOF	2.1 km	MPC · JPL
522266	2016 AQ_{276}	—	April 16, 2012	Haleakala	Pan-STARRS 1	·	1.5 km	MPC · JPL
522267	2016 AV_{276}	—	February 19, 2012	Kitt Peak	Spacewatch	·	1.8 km	MPC · JPL
522268	2016 AG_{277}	—	January 15, 2016	Haleakala	Pan-STARRS 1	·	1.1 km	MPC · JPL
522269	2016 AJ_{277}	—	August 30, 2005	Kitt Peak	Spacewatch	·	1.3 km	MPC · JPL
522270	2016 AO_{277}	—	October 1, 2008	Mount Lemmon	Mount Lemmon Survey	·	2.7 km	MPC · JPL
522271	2016 AR_{277}	—	November 18, 2014	Haleakala	Pan-STARRS 1	·	1.4 km	MPC · JPL
522272	2016 AX_{277}	—	May 29, 2009	Mount Lemmon	Mount Lemmon Survey	·	2.1 km	MPC · JPL
522273	2016 AA_{278}	—	December 15, 2009	Mount Lemmon	Mount Lemmon Survey	·	2.0 km	MPC · JPL
522274	2016 BC_{5}	—	October 5, 2014	Haleakala	Pan-STARRS 1	·	3.9 km	MPC · JPL
522275	2016 BN_{5}	—	April 21, 2012	Mount Lemmon	Mount Lemmon Survey	·	2.5 km	MPC · JPL
522276	2016 BX_{20}	—	February 2, 2005	Kitt Peak	Spacewatch	·	3.4 km	MPC · JPL
522277	2016 BD_{65}	—	September 15, 2007	Kitt Peak	Spacewatch	·	3.1 km	MPC · JPL
522278	2016 BQ_{94}	—	August 26, 2013	Haleakala	Pan-STARRS 1	EOS	2.3 km	MPC · JPL
522279	2016 BO_{95}	—	November 18, 2003	Kitt Peak	Spacewatch	EOS	1.7 km	MPC · JPL
522280	2016 BX_{95}	—	October 5, 2013	Haleakala	Pan-STARRS 1	VER	2.6 km	MPC · JPL
522281	2016 BA_{96}	—	January 10, 2007	Kitt Peak	Spacewatch	EUN	1.2 km	MPC · JPL
522282	2016 BE_{96}	—	December 25, 2010	Mount Lemmon	Mount Lemmon Survey	·	2.0 km	MPC · JPL
522283	2016 BF_{96}	—	November 1, 2008	Mount Lemmon	Mount Lemmon Survey	EOS	2.3 km	MPC · JPL
522284	2016 BU_{96}	—	March 9, 2011	Kitt Peak	Spacewatch	EUP	2.3 km	MPC · JPL
522285	2016 BW_{96}	—	March 11, 2008	Kitt Peak	Spacewatch	RAF	710 m	MPC · JPL
522286	2016 BC_{97}	—	October 28, 2014	Haleakala	Pan-STARRS 1	·	1.1 km	MPC · JPL
522287	2016 BD_{97}	—	March 19, 2013	Haleakala	Pan-STARRS 1	·	440 m	MPC · JPL
522288	2016 BG_{97}	—	March 10, 2008	Kitt Peak	Spacewatch	·	1.3 km	MPC · JPL
522289	2016 BM_{97}	—	June 16, 2012	Haleakala	Pan-STARRS 1	·	4.1 km	MPC · JPL
522290	2016 BQ_{97}	—	October 21, 2008	Kitt Peak	Spacewatch	·	2.6 km	MPC · JPL
522291	2016 BW_{97}	—	August 12, 2013	Haleakala	Pan-STARRS 1	EOS	1.4 km	MPC · JPL
522292	2016 BY_{97}	—	November 2, 2010	Kitt Peak	Spacewatch	·	1.2 km	MPC · JPL
522293	2016 BF_{98}	—	March 1, 2011	Mount Lemmon	Mount Lemmon Survey	KOR	1.1 km	MPC · JPL
522294	2016 BH_{98}	—	January 18, 2012	Mount Lemmon	Mount Lemmon Survey	V	580 m	MPC · JPL
522295	2016 BL_{98}	—	October 11, 2007	Kitt Peak	Spacewatch	·	2.8 km	MPC · JPL
522296	2016 BV_{98}	—	December 1, 2008	Mount Lemmon	Mount Lemmon Survey	·	2.6 km	MPC · JPL
522297	2016 BC_{99}	—	September 17, 2013	Mount Lemmon	Mount Lemmon Survey	·	2.5 km	MPC · JPL
522298	2016 BE_{99}	—	October 25, 2013	Mount Lemmon	Mount Lemmon Survey	·	2.9 km	MPC · JPL
522299	2016 BN_{99}	—	April 29, 2011	Mount Lemmon	Mount Lemmon Survey	·	3.0 km	MPC · JPL
522300	2016 BR_{99}	—	June 5, 2005	Kitt Peak	Spacewatch	·	3.2 km	MPC · JPL

== 522301–522400 ==
back to top

Designation			Discovery			Properties		Ref
Permanent	Provisional	Named after	Date	Site	Discoverer(s)	Category	Diam.	Ref
522301	2016 BT_{99}	—	March 9, 2011	Mount Lemmon	Mount Lemmon Survey	·	3.0 km	MPC · JPL
522302	2016 BV_{99}	—	May 1, 2011	Haleakala	Pan-STARRS 1	CYB	4.1 km	MPC · JPL
522303	2016 BC_{100}	—	January 26, 2012	Mount Lemmon	Mount Lemmon Survey	·	1.0 km	MPC · JPL
522304	2016 BD_{100}	—	January 18, 2016	Haleakala	Pan-STARRS 1	·	1.4 km	MPC · JPL
522305	2016 BF_{100}	—	January 1, 2012	Mount Lemmon	Mount Lemmon Survey	·	990 m	MPC · JPL
522306	2016 BL_{100}	—	December 23, 2014	Mount Lemmon	Mount Lemmon Survey	JUN	960 m	MPC · JPL
522307	2016 BD_{101}	—	April 4, 2011	Kitt Peak	Spacewatch	·	2.4 km	MPC · JPL
522308	2016 BJ_{101}	—	September 1, 2005	Kitt Peak	Spacewatch	MAR	910 m	MPC · JPL
522309	2016 BL_{101}	—	December 19, 2007	Kitt Peak	Spacewatch	·	1.0 km	MPC · JPL
522310	2016 BO_{101}	—	April 3, 2008	Mount Lemmon	Mount Lemmon Survey	·	1.0 km	MPC · JPL
522311	2016 BQ_{101}	—	September 12, 2007	Kitt Peak	Spacewatch	EOS	1.7 km	MPC · JPL
522312	2016 BR_{101}	—	October 8, 2004	Kitt Peak	Spacewatch	·	2.3 km	MPC · JPL
522313	2016 BS_{101}	—	March 12, 2008	Kitt Peak	Spacewatch	·	920 m	MPC · JPL
522314	2016 BU_{101}	—	November 24, 2009	Kitt Peak	Spacewatch	·	1.4 km	MPC · JPL
522315	2016 BX_{101}	—	February 16, 2012	Haleakala	Pan-STARRS 1	·	880 m	MPC · JPL
522316	2016 BB_{102}	—	January 10, 2007	Mount Lemmon	Mount Lemmon Survey	(5)	1.6 km	MPC · JPL
522317	2016 BC_{102}	—	August 12, 2013	Kitt Peak	Spacewatch	MAR	1.0 km	MPC · JPL
522318	2016 BE_{102}	—	October 8, 2007	Mount Lemmon	Mount Lemmon Survey	·	670 m	MPC · JPL
522319	2016 BF_{102}	—	September 12, 2013	Mount Lemmon	Mount Lemmon Survey	·	1.5 km	MPC · JPL
522320	2016 BG_{102}	—	February 4, 2012	Haleakala	Pan-STARRS 1	·	1.5 km	MPC · JPL
522321	2016 BK_{102}	—	October 5, 2008	La Sagra	OAM	·	3.7 km	MPC · JPL
522322	2016 BW_{102}	—	September 23, 2011	Kitt Peak	Spacewatch	·	650 m	MPC · JPL
522323	2016 BX_{102}	—	February 29, 2008	Kitt Peak	Spacewatch	EUN	930 m	MPC · JPL
522324	2016 BX_{103}	—	July 31, 2014	Haleakala	Pan-STARRS 1	·	1.8 km	MPC · JPL
522325	2016 BA_{104}	—	November 23, 2011	Mount Lemmon	Mount Lemmon Survey	·	790 m	MPC · JPL
522326	2016 BO_{104}	—	July 15, 2013	Haleakala	Pan-STARRS 1	·	3.2 km	MPC · JPL
522327	2016 BD_{105}	—	November 1, 2005	Mount Lemmon	Mount Lemmon Survey	·	1.5 km	MPC · JPL
522328	2016 BM_{105}	—	March 6, 2008	Mount Lemmon	Mount Lemmon Survey	·	870 m	MPC · JPL
522329	2016 BT_{105}	—	November 22, 2014	Haleakala	Pan-STARRS 1	·	2.4 km	MPC · JPL
522330	2016 BU_{105}	—	January 3, 2012	Mount Lemmon	Mount Lemmon Survey	V	640 m	MPC · JPL
522331	2016 CA_{9}	—	November 28, 2010	Mount Lemmon	Mount Lemmon Survey	·	1.4 km	MPC · JPL
522332	2016 CX_{156}	—	December 25, 2005	Kitt Peak	Spacewatch	KOR	1.2 km	MPC · JPL
522333	2016 CO_{222}	—	January 7, 2010	Kitt Peak	Spacewatch	·	3.8 km	MPC · JPL
522334	2016 CN_{264}	—	May 8, 2006	Mount Lemmon	Mount Lemmon Survey	THM	2.5 km	MPC · JPL
522335	2016 CO_{290}	—	February 20, 2009	Kitt Peak	Spacewatch	·	970 m	MPC · JPL
522336	2016 CK_{291}	—	January 24, 2001	Kitt Peak	Spacewatch	·	1.2 km	MPC · JPL
522337	2016 CS_{291}	—	August 4, 2013	Haleakala	Pan-STARRS 1	MAS	650 m	MPC · JPL
522338	2016 CZ_{294}	—	January 19, 2012	Haleakala	Pan-STARRS 1	·	1.4 km	MPC · JPL
522339	2016 CH_{295}	—	October 16, 2006	Kitt Peak	Spacewatch	·	910 m	MPC · JPL
522340	2016 CN_{295}	—	August 24, 2008	Kitt Peak	Spacewatch	·	2.3 km	MPC · JPL
522341	2016 CF_{296}	—	January 10, 2007	Kitt Peak	Spacewatch	·	1.4 km	MPC · JPL
522342	2016 CQ_{296}	—	June 9, 2012	Mount Lemmon	Mount Lemmon Survey	NAE	2.1 km	MPC · JPL
522343	2016 CS_{296}	—	March 31, 2011	Mount Lemmon	Mount Lemmon Survey	·	2.9 km	MPC · JPL
522344	2016 CX_{296}	—	October 12, 2009	Mount Lemmon	Mount Lemmon Survey	·	2.2 km	MPC · JPL
522345	2016 CB_{297}	—	May 23, 2006	Kitt Peak	Spacewatch	·	3.1 km	MPC · JPL
522346	2016 CG_{297}	—	November 9, 2008	Kitt Peak	Spacewatch	VER	2.7 km	MPC · JPL
522347	2016 CQ_{297}	—	December 5, 2010	Mount Lemmon	Mount Lemmon Survey	·	1.0 km	MPC · JPL
522348	2016 CS_{297}	—	July 28, 2012	Haleakala	Pan-STARRS 1	·	2.8 km	MPC · JPL
522349	2016 CT_{297}	—	July 14, 2013	Haleakala	Pan-STARRS 1	·	1.7 km	MPC · JPL
522350	2016 CV_{297}	—	December 26, 2006	Kitt Peak	Spacewatch	·	1.4 km	MPC · JPL
522351	2016 CG_{298}	—	August 20, 2009	Kitt Peak	Spacewatch	·	1.7 km	MPC · JPL
522352	2016 CJ_{298}	—	February 12, 2012	Mount Lemmon	Mount Lemmon Survey	MAS	640 m	MPC · JPL
522353	2016 CR_{298}	—	December 15, 2006	Kitt Peak	Spacewatch	·	1.5 km	MPC · JPL
522354	2016 CS_{298}	—	June 7, 2013	Haleakala	Pan-STARRS 1	V	560 m	MPC · JPL
522355	2016 CW_{298}	—	September 14, 2007	Kitt Peak	Spacewatch	·	3.2 km	MPC · JPL
522356	2016 CE_{299}	—	November 22, 2014	Haleakala	Pan-STARRS 1	·	1.5 km	MPC · JPL
522357	2016 CJ_{299}	—	April 15, 2013	Haleakala	Pan-STARRS 1	·	640 m	MPC · JPL
522358	2016 CK_{299}	—	December 3, 2010	Mount Lemmon	Mount Lemmon Survey	·	1.2 km	MPC · JPL
522359	2016 CN_{299}	—	January 20, 2009	Kitt Peak	Spacewatch	·	550 m	MPC · JPL
522360	2016 CP_{299}	—	July 15, 2013	Haleakala	Pan-STARRS 1	·	2.1 km	MPC · JPL
522361	2016 CS_{299}	—	August 27, 2009	Kitt Peak	Spacewatch	·	1.3 km	MPC · JPL
522362	2016 CK_{300}	—	April 1, 2008	Kitt Peak	Spacewatch	·	1.1 km	MPC · JPL
522363	2016 CU_{300}	—	August 11, 2008	La Sagra	OAM	·	1.6 km	MPC · JPL
522364	2016 CV_{300}	—	April 1, 2008	Mount Lemmon	Mount Lemmon Survey	·	930 m	MPC · JPL
522365	2016 CX_{300}	—	February 4, 2005	Kitt Peak	Spacewatch	·	2.0 km	MPC · JPL
522366	2016 CD_{301}	—	March 4, 2006	Kitt Peak	Spacewatch	·	1.4 km	MPC · JPL
522367	2016 CO_{301}	—	May 3, 2006	Kitt Peak	Spacewatch	·	2.6 km	MPC · JPL
522368	2016 CQ_{301}	—	August 24, 2007	Kitt Peak	Spacewatch	·	2.8 km	MPC · JPL
522369	2016 CS_{301}	—	August 29, 2009	Kitt Peak	Spacewatch	·	2.4 km	MPC · JPL
522370	2016 CE_{302}	—	March 16, 2007	Kitt Peak	Spacewatch	·	2.0 km	MPC · JPL
522371	2016 CF_{302}	—	February 4, 2012	Haleakala	Pan-STARRS 1	·	1.4 km	MPC · JPL
522372	2016 CH_{302}	—	February 25, 2007	Kitt Peak	Spacewatch	·	1.5 km	MPC · JPL
522373	2016 CU_{302}	—	July 25, 2006	Mount Lemmon	Mount Lemmon Survey	·	1.2 km	MPC · JPL
522374	2016 CW_{302}	—	February 10, 2008	Mount Lemmon	Mount Lemmon Survey	·	1.0 km	MPC · JPL
522375	2016 CX_{302}	—	November 25, 2014	Mount Lemmon	Mount Lemmon Survey	·	1.4 km	MPC · JPL
522376	2016 CY_{302}	—	February 27, 2009	Kitt Peak	Spacewatch	·	640 m	MPC · JPL
522377	2016 CB_{303}	—	February 4, 2005	Mount Lemmon	Mount Lemmon Survey	·	2.4 km	MPC · JPL
522378	2016 CD_{303}	—	April 27, 2012	Haleakala	Pan-STARRS 1	MIS	1.6 km	MPC · JPL
522379	2016 CG_{303}	—	May 26, 2011	Mount Lemmon	Mount Lemmon Survey	·	3.0 km	MPC · JPL
522380	2016 CJ_{303}	—	May 21, 2006	Kitt Peak	Spacewatch	·	2.7 km	MPC · JPL
522381	2016 CK_{303}	—	September 1, 2013	Catalina	CSS	EUN	1.1 km	MPC · JPL
522382	2016 CF_{304}	—	March 31, 2008	Kitt Peak	Spacewatch	·	1.2 km	MPC · JPL
522383	2016 CN_{304}	—	November 16, 2006	Kitt Peak	Spacewatch	·	1.7 km	MPC · JPL
522384	2016 CX_{304}	—	May 13, 2012	Mount Lemmon	Mount Lemmon Survey	·	1.2 km	MPC · JPL
522385	2016 CK_{305}	—	January 2, 2011	Mount Lemmon	Mount Lemmon Survey	·	1.1 km	MPC · JPL
522386	2016 CT_{305}	—	March 11, 2008	Kitt Peak	Spacewatch	·	970 m	MPC · JPL
522387	2016 CJ_{306}	—	October 26, 2011	Haleakala	Pan-STARRS 1	·	550 m	MPC · JPL
522388	2016 CK_{306}	—	October 28, 2014	Haleakala	Pan-STARRS 1	·	940 m	MPC · JPL
522389	2016 CS_{306}	—	March 31, 2009	Kitt Peak	Spacewatch	·	850 m	MPC · JPL
522390	2016 CV_{306}	—	June 20, 2013	Mount Lemmon	Mount Lemmon Survey	·	1.1 km	MPC · JPL
522391	2016 CX_{306}	—	September 2, 2010	Mount Lemmon	Mount Lemmon Survey	V	640 m	MPC · JPL
522392	2016 CG_{307}	—	August 14, 2013	Haleakala	Pan-STARRS 1	·	1.7 km	MPC · JPL
522393	2016 CF_{308}	—	March 24, 2012	Kitt Peak	Spacewatch	·	1.1 km	MPC · JPL
522394	2016 CH_{308}	—	October 26, 2009	Mount Lemmon	Mount Lemmon Survey	KOR	1.3 km	MPC · JPL
522395	2016 CS_{308}	—	March 11, 2011	Kitt Peak	Spacewatch	·	2.8 km	MPC · JPL
522396	2016 CA_{309}	—	April 6, 2011	Mount Lemmon	Mount Lemmon Survey	·	2.7 km	MPC · JPL
522397	2016 CC_{309}	—	February 7, 2011	Mount Lemmon	Mount Lemmon Survey	HOF	2.2 km	MPC · JPL
522398	2016 CE_{309}	—	March 26, 2004	Kitt Peak	Spacewatch	·	1.4 km	MPC · JPL
522399	2016 CF_{309}	—	February 25, 2012	Kitt Peak	Spacewatch	·	1.1 km	MPC · JPL
522400	2016 CL_{309}	—	December 31, 2011	Kitt Peak	Spacewatch	V	530 m	MPC · JPL

== 522401–522500 ==
back to top

Designation			Discovery			Properties		Ref
Permanent	Provisional	Named after	Date	Site	Discoverer(s)	Category	Diam.	Ref
522401	2016 CN_{309}	—	June 17, 2012	Kitt Peak	Spacewatch	·	3.1 km	MPC · JPL
522402	2016 CR_{309}	—	December 25, 2005	Mount Lemmon	Mount Lemmon Survey	·	2.4 km	MPC · JPL
522403	2016 CX_{309}	—	September 24, 1995	Kitt Peak	Spacewatch	·	1.5 km	MPC · JPL
522404	2016 CZ_{309}	—	February 23, 2007	Kitt Peak	Spacewatch	HOF	2.4 km	MPC · JPL
522405	2016 CC_{310}	—	August 28, 2005	Kitt Peak	Spacewatch	·	1.4 km	MPC · JPL
522406	2016 CD_{310}	—	September 20, 2014	Haleakala	Pan-STARRS 1	·	2.1 km	MPC · JPL
522407	2016 CG_{310}	—	January 2, 2011	Mount Lemmon	Mount Lemmon Survey	AST	1.4 km	MPC · JPL
522408	2016 CS_{310}	—	February 27, 2012	Haleakala	Pan-STARRS 1	·	820 m	MPC · JPL
522409	2016 CT_{310}	—	October 7, 2004	Kitt Peak	Spacewatch	KOR	1.2 km	MPC · JPL
522410	2016 CZ_{310}	—	March 11, 2008	Kitt Peak	Spacewatch	·	930 m	MPC · JPL
522411	2016 CA_{311}	—	September 24, 2008	Kitt Peak	Spacewatch	·	3.0 km	MPC · JPL
522412	2016 CH_{311}	—	October 11, 2007	Kitt Peak	Spacewatch	CYB	2.7 km	MPC · JPL
522413	2016 CL_{311}	—	February 26, 2011	Mount Lemmon	Mount Lemmon Survey	·	1.7 km	MPC · JPL
522414	2016 CM_{311}	—	September 23, 2008	Kitt Peak	Spacewatch	·	2.4 km	MPC · JPL
522415	2016 CN_{311}	—	September 14, 2013	Kitt Peak	Spacewatch	·	1.2 km	MPC · JPL
522416	2016 CW_{311}	—	October 25, 2005	Kitt Peak	Spacewatch	RAF	930 m	MPC · JPL
522417	2016 CH_{312}	—	April 29, 2012	Kitt Peak	Spacewatch	·	1.8 km	MPC · JPL
522418	2016 CJ_{312}	—	October 5, 2013	Haleakala	Pan-STARRS 1	HYG	2.5 km	MPC · JPL
522419	2016 CP_{312}	—	September 11, 2007	Mount Lemmon	Mount Lemmon Survey	·	3.1 km	MPC · JPL
522420	2016 CT_{312}	—	October 27, 2008	Mount Lemmon	Mount Lemmon Survey	·	2.2 km	MPC · JPL
522421	2016 CG_{313}	—	January 9, 2006	Kitt Peak	Spacewatch	·	1.9 km	MPC · JPL
522422	2016 CQ_{313}	—	September 13, 2007	Mount Lemmon	Mount Lemmon Survey	·	2.6 km	MPC · JPL
522423	2016 CB_{314}	—	February 19, 2015	Haleakala	Pan-STARRS 1	·	2.3 km	MPC · JPL
522424	2016 CE_{314}	—	January 8, 2011	Mount Lemmon	Mount Lemmon Survey	·	1.3 km	MPC · JPL
522425	2016 CF_{314}	—	February 10, 2011	Mount Lemmon	Mount Lemmon Survey	·	1.6 km	MPC · JPL
522426	2016 CH_{314}	—	January 22, 2015	Haleakala	Pan-STARRS 1	·	1.5 km	MPC · JPL
522427	2016 CM_{314}	—	April 29, 2006	Kitt Peak	Spacewatch	·	1.5 km	MPC · JPL
522428	2016 CQ_{314}	—	January 14, 2012	Kitt Peak	Spacewatch	·	710 m	MPC · JPL
522429	2016 CV_{314}	—	January 1, 2008	Kitt Peak	Spacewatch	V	590 m	MPC · JPL
522430	2016 CA_{315}	—	November 25, 2009	Mount Lemmon	Mount Lemmon Survey	·	2.6 km	MPC · JPL
522431	2016 CC_{315}	—	January 1, 2009	Kitt Peak	Spacewatch	·	3.4 km	MPC · JPL
522432	2016 CE_{316}	—	February 13, 2011	Mount Lemmon	Mount Lemmon Survey	·	1.6 km	MPC · JPL
522433	2016 CM_{316}	—	December 12, 2006	Kitt Peak	Spacewatch	·	990 m	MPC · JPL
522434	2016 CN_{316}	—	October 7, 2008	Kitt Peak	Spacewatch	HYG	1.9 km	MPC · JPL
522435	2016 CO_{316}	—	February 20, 2006	Kitt Peak	Spacewatch	·	1.6 km	MPC · JPL
522436	2016 CS_{317}	—	April 22, 2012	Kitt Peak	Spacewatch	·	2.1 km	MPC · JPL
522437	2016 CD_{318}	—	March 2, 2011	Catalina	CSS	·	2.1 km	MPC · JPL
522438	2016 CE_{318}	—	December 1, 2014	Haleakala	Pan-STARRS 1	·	2.1 km	MPC · JPL
522439	2016 CJ_{318}	—	April 14, 2008	Mount Lemmon	Mount Lemmon Survey	·	1.2 km	MPC · JPL
522440	2016 CV_{318}	—	October 27, 2005	Kitt Peak	Spacewatch	·	1.4 km	MPC · JPL
522441	2016 CW_{318}	—	April 1, 2008	Kitt Peak	Spacewatch	·	770 m	MPC · JPL
522442	2016 CC_{319}	—	January 12, 2011	Kitt Peak	Spacewatch	·	1.4 km	MPC · JPL
522443	2016 CG_{319}	—	May 29, 2008	Kitt Peak	Spacewatch	·	1.3 km	MPC · JPL
522444	2016 CM_{319}	—	November 1, 2013	Mount Lemmon	Mount Lemmon Survey	·	3.2 km	MPC · JPL
522445	2016 CN_{319}	—	December 11, 2010	Mount Lemmon	Mount Lemmon Survey	·	1.6 km	MPC · JPL
522446	2016 CO_{319}	—	March 26, 2011	Mount Lemmon	Mount Lemmon Survey	·	1.7 km	MPC · JPL
522447	2016 CP_{319}	—	November 27, 2014	Mount Lemmon	Mount Lemmon Survey	EOS	1.8 km	MPC · JPL
522448	2016 CQ_{319}	—	September 6, 2008	Mount Lemmon	Mount Lemmon Survey	EUN	1.3 km	MPC · JPL
522449	2016 CU_{319}	—	December 31, 2007	Mount Lemmon	Mount Lemmon Survey	PHO	910 m	MPC · JPL
522450	2016 CV_{319}	—	December 13, 2010	Kitt Peak	Spacewatch	KON	2.2 km	MPC · JPL
522451	2016 CA_{320}	—	November 1, 1999	Kitt Peak	Spacewatch	BRA	1.4 km	MPC · JPL
522452	2016 CD_{320}	—	May 10, 2011	Mount Lemmon	Mount Lemmon Survey	·	2.0 km	MPC · JPL
522453	2016 CH_{320}	—	November 20, 2008	Kitt Peak	Spacewatch	EOS	1.8 km	MPC · JPL
522454	2016 CJ_{320}	—	October 14, 2001	Cima Ekar	ADAS	TIR	3.0 km	MPC · JPL
522455	2016 CN_{320}	—	December 1, 2005	Mount Lemmon	Mount Lemmon Survey	·	1.7 km	MPC · JPL
522456	2016 CQ_{320}	—	September 6, 2013	Kitt Peak	Spacewatch	·	1.6 km	MPC · JPL
522457	2016 CU_{320}	—	September 25, 2012	Kitt Peak	Spacewatch	·	2.7 km	MPC · JPL
522458	2016 CV_{320}	—	April 27, 2011	Mount Lemmon	Mount Lemmon Survey	·	2.7 km	MPC · JPL
522459	2016 CY_{320}	—	December 31, 2008	Mount Lemmon	Mount Lemmon Survey	·	2.2 km	MPC · JPL
522460	2016 CJ_{321}	—	November 17, 2014	Haleakala	Pan-STARRS 1	MAR	1.2 km	MPC · JPL
522461	2016 CK_{321}	—	December 7, 2005	Kitt Peak	Spacewatch	·	2.5 km	MPC · JPL
522462	2016 CN_{321}	—	November 30, 2014	Haleakala	Pan-STARRS 1	·	2.7 km	MPC · JPL
522463	2016 CP_{321}	—	July 15, 2013	Haleakala	Pan-STARRS 1	MAR	830 m	MPC · JPL
522464	2016 CR_{321}	—	February 12, 2016	Haleakala	Pan-STARRS 1	·	1.5 km	MPC · JPL
522465	2016 CT_{321}	—	September 6, 2012	Mount Lemmon	Mount Lemmon Survey	·	2.8 km	MPC · JPL
522466 Auyeung	2016 CU_{321}	Auyeung	February 19, 2010	WISE	WISE	·	2.3 km	MPC · JPL
522467	2016 CV_{321}	—	March 27, 2003	Kitt Peak	Spacewatch	·	1.4 km	MPC · JPL
522468	2016 CX_{321}	—	April 22, 2007	Mount Lemmon	Mount Lemmon Survey	·	1.9 km	MPC · JPL
522469	2016 CP_{322}	—	November 17, 2014	Haleakala	Pan-STARRS 1	EUN	1.3 km	MPC · JPL
522470	2016 CU_{322}	—	November 10, 2009	Kitt Peak	Spacewatch	·	2.7 km	MPC · JPL
522471	2016 CW_{322}	—	August 30, 2005	Kitt Peak	Spacewatch	·	2.1 km	MPC · JPL
522472	2016 DO_{33}	—	October 16, 2007	Mount Lemmon	Mount Lemmon Survey	·	940 m	MPC · JPL
522473	2016 DR_{33}	—	October 27, 2009	Mount Lemmon	Mount Lemmon Survey	·	2.6 km	MPC · JPL
522474	2016 DD_{34}	—	April 15, 2012	Haleakala	Pan-STARRS 1	·	1.5 km	MPC · JPL
522475	2016 DH_{34}	—	February 6, 2007	Kitt Peak	Spacewatch	·	1.3 km	MPC · JPL
522476	2016 DB_{35}	—	February 3, 2012	Haleakala	Pan-STARRS 1	·	970 m	MPC · JPL
522477	2016 DE_{35}	—	July 29, 2008	Kitt Peak	Spacewatch	KOR	1.3 km	MPC · JPL
522478	2016 DN_{35}	—	April 15, 2008	Kitt Peak	Spacewatch	·	860 m	MPC · JPL
522479	2016 DQ_{35}	—	April 1, 2005	Kitt Peak	Spacewatch	VER	2.8 km	MPC · JPL
522480	2016 DR_{35}	—	April 7, 2011	Kitt Peak	Spacewatch	EOS	1.7 km	MPC · JPL
522481	2016 EA_{130}	—	July 29, 2008	Kitt Peak	Spacewatch	KOR	1.3 km	MPC · JPL
522482	2016 EU_{144}	—	March 14, 2011	Mount Lemmon	Mount Lemmon Survey	EOS	2.3 km	MPC · JPL
522483	2016 EJ_{222}	—	July 3, 2011	Mount Lemmon	Mount Lemmon Survey	HYG	2.8 km	MPC · JPL
522484	2016 ER_{227}	—	March 26, 2007	Mount Lemmon	Mount Lemmon Survey	·	1.4 km	MPC · JPL
522485	2016 ES_{229}	—	September 23, 2008	Siding Spring	SSS	·	2.6 km	MPC · JPL
522486	2016 EU_{229}	—	March 4, 2011	Mount Lemmon	Mount Lemmon Survey	KOR	1.3 km	MPC · JPL
522487	2016 ED_{230}	—	April 27, 2012	Haleakala	Pan-STARRS 1	·	1.5 km	MPC · JPL
522488	2016 EG_{230}	—	May 15, 2012	Haleakala	Pan-STARRS 1	·	1.8 km	MPC · JPL
522489	2016 EL_{230}	—	October 29, 2010	Mount Lemmon	Mount Lemmon Survey	·	1.2 km	MPC · JPL
522490	2016 EN_{230}	—	December 28, 2005	Kitt Peak	Spacewatch	·	1.9 km	MPC · JPL
522491	2016 EW_{230}	—	March 2, 2016	Haleakala	Pan-STARRS 1	·	1.9 km	MPC · JPL
522492	2016 EZ_{230}	—	October 28, 2014	Haleakala	Pan-STARRS 1	V	530 m	MPC · JPL
522493	2016 ED_{231}	—	April 26, 2011	Mount Lemmon	Mount Lemmon Survey	·	3.7 km	MPC · JPL
522494	2016 EH_{231}	—	November 21, 2014	Haleakala	Pan-STARRS 1	EUN	1.0 km	MPC · JPL
522495	2016 EW_{231}	—	February 14, 2010	Mount Lemmon	Mount Lemmon Survey	·	2.9 km	MPC · JPL
522496	2016 EB_{232}	—	February 23, 2012	Kitt Peak	Spacewatch	·	2.0 km	MPC · JPL
522497	2016 EG_{232}	—	November 17, 2014	Haleakala	Pan-STARRS 1	·	1.6 km	MPC · JPL
522498	2016 EH_{232}	—	January 16, 2015	Haleakala	Pan-STARRS 1	·	2.9 km	MPC · JPL
522499	2016 EO_{232}	—	November 14, 2010	Kitt Peak	Spacewatch	·	770 m	MPC · JPL
522500	2016 ES_{232}	—	September 25, 2005	Kitt Peak	Spacewatch	·	1.2 km	MPC · JPL

== 522501–522600 ==
back to top

Designation			Discovery			Properties		Ref
Permanent	Provisional	Named after	Date	Site	Discoverer(s)	Category	Diam.	Ref
522501	2016 EV_{232}	—	October 18, 2007	Mount Lemmon	Mount Lemmon Survey	·	2.2 km	MPC · JPL
522502	2016 EC_{233}	—	March 14, 2011	Mount Lemmon	Mount Lemmon Survey	·	1.9 km	MPC · JPL
522503	2016 EE_{233}	—	March 17, 2005	Kitt Peak	Spacewatch	·	2.4 km	MPC · JPL
522504	2016 EH_{233}	—	April 7, 2011	Kitt Peak	Spacewatch	·	1.4 km	MPC · JPL
522505	2016 EN_{233}	—	March 26, 2007	Kitt Peak	Spacewatch	·	1.8 km	MPC · JPL
522506	2016 EO_{233}	—	September 7, 2004	Kitt Peak	Spacewatch	·	1.9 km	MPC · JPL
522507	2016 EP_{233}	—	December 13, 2006	Kitt Peak	Spacewatch	·	1.3 km	MPC · JPL
522508	2016 EQ_{233}	—	September 14, 2007	Mount Lemmon	Mount Lemmon Survey	·	2.2 km	MPC · JPL
522509	2016 ER_{233}	—	September 23, 2008	Mount Lemmon	Mount Lemmon Survey	·	1.9 km	MPC · JPL
522510	2016 ES_{233}	—	October 1, 1995	Kitt Peak	Spacewatch	WIT	1.1 km	MPC · JPL
522511	2016 EW_{233}	—	June 4, 2005	Kitt Peak	Spacewatch	PHO	720 m	MPC · JPL
522512	2016 EZ_{233}	—	May 7, 2008	Kitt Peak	Spacewatch	EUN	800 m	MPC · JPL
522513	2016 ED_{234}	—	October 25, 2013	Mount Lemmon	Mount Lemmon Survey	EOS	1.5 km	MPC · JPL
522514	2016 EH_{234}	—	January 29, 2011	Mount Lemmon	Mount Lemmon Survey	·	1.1 km	MPC · JPL
522515	2016 EO_{234}	—	January 18, 2015	Mount Lemmon	Mount Lemmon Survey	·	2.8 km	MPC · JPL
522516	2016 ER_{234}	—	February 25, 2012	Kitt Peak	Spacewatch	·	1.1 km	MPC · JPL
522517	2016 ES_{234}	—	February 10, 2008	Kitt Peak	Spacewatch	V	690 m	MPC · JPL
522518	2016 EA_{235}	—	March 16, 2012	Mount Lemmon	Mount Lemmon Survey	·	1.1 km	MPC · JPL
522519	2016 EF_{235}	—	April 23, 2007	Mount Lemmon	Mount Lemmon Survey	·	1.8 km	MPC · JPL
522520	2016 EL_{235}	—	October 3, 2008	Mount Lemmon	Mount Lemmon Survey	·	2.2 km	MPC · JPL
522521	2016 EP_{235}	—	December 10, 2005	Kitt Peak	Spacewatch	·	1.4 km	MPC · JPL
522522	2016 EQ_{235}	—	February 14, 2010	Kitt Peak	Spacewatch	THM	1.9 km	MPC · JPL
522523	2016 EV_{235}	—	November 9, 2007	Kitt Peak	Spacewatch	·	630 m	MPC · JPL
522524	2016 EY_{235}	—	January 20, 2015	Haleakala	Pan-STARRS 1	THM	2.1 km	MPC · JPL
522525	2016 EC_{236}	—	December 26, 2014	Haleakala	Pan-STARRS 1	·	2.8 km	MPC · JPL
522526	2016 EL_{236}	—	December 29, 2014	Haleakala	Pan-STARRS 1	·	1.9 km	MPC · JPL
522527	2016 EM_{236}	—	January 17, 2015	Haleakala	Pan-STARRS 1	·	1.8 km	MPC · JPL
522528	2016 EN_{236}	—	May 13, 2011	Mount Lemmon	Mount Lemmon Survey	·	2.4 km	MPC · JPL
522529	2016 ER_{236}	—	January 19, 2015	Haleakala	Pan-STARRS 1	·	2.0 km	MPC · JPL
522530	2016 EV_{236}	—	November 6, 2013	Haleakala	Pan-STARRS 1	·	2.5 km	MPC · JPL
522531	2016 EX_{236}	—	June 8, 2012	Mount Lemmon	Mount Lemmon Survey	MAR	1.0 km	MPC · JPL
522532	2016 EK_{237}	—	March 30, 2012	Mount Lemmon	Mount Lemmon Survey	V	660 m	MPC · JPL
522533	2016 EQ_{237}	—	August 22, 2004	Kitt Peak	Spacewatch	·	1.2 km	MPC · JPL
522534	2016 ET_{237}	—	March 8, 2005	Mount Lemmon	Mount Lemmon Survey	·	1.8 km	MPC · JPL
522535	2016 EV_{237}	—	August 23, 2007	Kitt Peak	Spacewatch	EOS	1.8 km	MPC · JPL
522536	2016 EX_{237}	—	January 6, 2010	Kitt Peak	Spacewatch	·	2.6 km	MPC · JPL
522537	2016 EA_{238}	—	January 6, 2010	Mount Lemmon	Mount Lemmon Survey	·	2.1 km	MPC · JPL
522538	2016 EL_{238}	—	December 22, 2008	Kitt Peak	Spacewatch	·	650 m	MPC · JPL
522539	2016 EN_{238}	—	January 11, 2010	Mount Lemmon	Mount Lemmon Survey	·	2.9 km	MPC · JPL
522540	2016 ES_{238}	—	October 9, 2013	Catalina	CSS	·	2.5 km	MPC · JPL
522541	2016 ED_{239}	—	January 14, 2011	Kitt Peak	Spacewatch	·	1.5 km	MPC · JPL
522542	2016 EE_{239}	—	December 5, 2010	Mount Lemmon	Mount Lemmon Survey	·	1.6 km	MPC · JPL
522543	2016 EH_{239}	—	February 26, 2012	Mount Lemmon	Mount Lemmon Survey	·	1.3 km	MPC · JPL
522544	2016 EK_{239}	—	June 7, 2011	Mount Lemmon	Mount Lemmon Survey	·	2.2 km	MPC · JPL
522545	2016 EM_{239}	—	May 2, 2005	Kitt Peak	Spacewatch	·	2.0 km	MPC · JPL
522546	2016 EN_{239}	—	March 7, 2016	Haleakala	Pan-STARRS 1	·	1.1 km	MPC · JPL
522547	2016 EP_{239}	—	May 27, 2012	Mount Lemmon	Mount Lemmon Survey	KON	1.9 km	MPC · JPL
522548	2016 ES_{239}	—	February 12, 2011	Mount Lemmon	Mount Lemmon Survey	·	1.1 km	MPC · JPL
522549	2016 EA_{240}	—	January 17, 2016	Haleakala	Pan-STARRS 1	·	1.4 km	MPC · JPL
522550	2016 EC_{240}	—	December 12, 2014	Haleakala	Pan-STARRS 1	(194)	1.2 km	MPC · JPL
522551	2016 ED_{240}	—	January 8, 2010	Kitt Peak	Spacewatch	TIR	2.3 km	MPC · JPL
522552	2016 EA_{241}	—	August 17, 2012	Haleakala	Pan-STARRS 1	·	1.4 km	MPC · JPL
522553	2016 EF_{241}	—	March 16, 2012	Mount Lemmon	Mount Lemmon Survey	·	980 m	MPC · JPL
522554	2016 EL_{241}	—	September 13, 2005	Kitt Peak	Spacewatch	·	900 m	MPC · JPL
522555	2016 EB_{242}	—	September 3, 2013	Haleakala	Pan-STARRS 1	KOR	1.1 km	MPC · JPL
522556	2016 ED_{242}	—	April 29, 2012	Kitt Peak	Spacewatch	·	1.5 km	MPC · JPL
522557	2016 EK_{242}	—	November 26, 2009	Kitt Peak	Spacewatch	KOR	1.3 km	MPC · JPL
522558	2016 EQ_{242}	—	October 7, 2005	Catalina	CSS	·	1.4 km	MPC · JPL
522559	2016 EU_{242}	—	January 25, 2006	Kitt Peak	Spacewatch	AGN	1.0 km	MPC · JPL
522560	2016 EQ_{243}	—	January 16, 2011	Mount Lemmon	Mount Lemmon Survey	·	1.2 km	MPC · JPL
522561	2016 ET_{243}	—	February 15, 2012	Haleakala	Pan-STARRS 1	·	1.0 km	MPC · JPL
522562	2016 EU_{243}	—	February 2, 2006	Kitt Peak	Spacewatch	HOF	2.2 km	MPC · JPL
522563 Randyflynn	2016 EV_{243}	Randyflynn	December 6, 2010	Mount Lemmon	Mount Lemmon Survey	·	1.2 km	MPC · JPL
522564	2016 EY_{243}	—	March 21, 2012	Mount Lemmon	Mount Lemmon Survey	·	890 m	MPC · JPL
522565	2016 EZ_{243}	—	September 4, 2008	Kitt Peak	Spacewatch	KOR	1.3 km	MPC · JPL
522566	2016 ED_{244}	—	May 8, 2005	Kitt Peak	Spacewatch	·	2.8 km	MPC · JPL
522567	2016 EF_{244}	—	September 21, 2003	Anderson Mesa	LONEOS	WAT	1.4 km	MPC · JPL
522568	2016 EK_{244}	—	October 5, 2013	Haleakala	Pan-STARRS 1	·	1.7 km	MPC · JPL
522569	2016 EP_{244}	—	June 18, 2013	Haleakala	Pan-STARRS 1	·	1.2 km	MPC · JPL
522570	2016 ER_{244}	—	March 3, 2009	Kitt Peak	Spacewatch	·	700 m	MPC · JPL
522571	2016 EX_{244}	—	September 27, 2009	Kitt Peak	Spacewatch	·	1.3 km	MPC · JPL
522572	2016 EY_{244}	—	September 4, 2007	Mount Lemmon	Mount Lemmon Survey	·	2.5 km	MPC · JPL
522573	2016 EZ_{244}	—	December 14, 2010	Mount Lemmon	Mount Lemmon Survey	·	2.1 km	MPC · JPL
522574	2016 EA_{245}	—	January 21, 2012	Haleakala	Pan-STARRS 1	·	1.2 km	MPC · JPL
522575	2016 EC_{245}	—	December 10, 2005	Kitt Peak	Spacewatch	·	2.8 km	MPC · JPL
522576	2016 EG_{245}	—	February 10, 2011	Mount Lemmon	Mount Lemmon Survey	·	2.0 km	MPC · JPL
522577	2016 EH_{245}	—	September 14, 2013	Haleakala	Pan-STARRS 1	·	2.0 km	MPC · JPL
522578	2016 EJ_{245}	—	January 28, 2011	Kitt Peak	Spacewatch	·	1.9 km	MPC · JPL
522579	2016 EO_{245}	—	July 14, 2013	Haleakala	Pan-STARRS 1	·	980 m	MPC · JPL
522580	2016 EQ_{245}	—	January 25, 2011	Kitt Peak	Spacewatch	·	1.4 km	MPC · JPL
522581	2016 EA_{246}	—	August 28, 2009	Kitt Peak	Spacewatch	MAR	740 m	MPC · JPL
522582	2016 EE_{246}	—	March 15, 2012	Mount Lemmon	Mount Lemmon Survey	·	860 m	MPC · JPL
522583	2016 EG_{246}	—	September 17, 2006	Kitt Peak	Spacewatch	·	1 km	MPC · JPL
522584	2016 EJ_{246}	—	January 14, 2011	Mount Lemmon	Mount Lemmon Survey	·	1.2 km	MPC · JPL
522585	2016 EL_{246}	—	April 2, 2005	Kitt Peak	Spacewatch	·	1.1 km	MPC · JPL
522586	2016 EO_{246}	—	September 13, 2007	Mount Lemmon	Mount Lemmon Survey	·	3.0 km	MPC · JPL
522587	2016 EV_{246}	—	April 2, 2006	Kitt Peak	Spacewatch	·	1.2 km	MPC · JPL
522588	2016 EX_{246}	—	April 20, 2012	Mount Lemmon	Mount Lemmon Survey	·	980 m	MPC · JPL
522589	2016 EY_{246}	—	November 20, 2014	Mount Lemmon	Mount Lemmon Survey	·	920 m	MPC · JPL
522590	2016 EA_{247}	—	September 24, 2013	Mount Lemmon	Mount Lemmon Survey	·	1.3 km	MPC · JPL
522591	2016 EF_{247}	—	March 13, 2016	Haleakala	Pan-STARRS 1	·	1.2 km	MPC · JPL
522592	2016 EO_{247}	—	March 20, 2007	Kitt Peak	Spacewatch	·	1.6 km	MPC · JPL
522593	2016 EQ_{247}	—	October 13, 2007	Kitt Peak	Spacewatch	·	610 m	MPC · JPL
522594	2016 ER_{247}	—	October 13, 2013	Mount Lemmon	Mount Lemmon Survey	·	1.7 km	MPC · JPL
522595	2016 ES_{247}	—	April 28, 2012	Mount Lemmon	Mount Lemmon Survey	·	1.0 km	MPC · JPL
522596	2016 EU_{247}	—	April 11, 2005	Mount Lemmon	Mount Lemmon Survey	·	2.3 km	MPC · JPL
522597	2016 EW_{247}	—	April 12, 2011	Kitt Peak	Spacewatch	·	1.4 km	MPC · JPL
522598	2016 EX_{247}	—	November 21, 2009	Kitt Peak	Spacewatch	HOF	2.3 km	MPC · JPL
522599	2016 EZ_{247}	—	December 6, 2005	Kitt Peak	Spacewatch	NEM	1.9 km	MPC · JPL
522600	2016 EM_{248}	—	January 14, 2011	Mount Lemmon	Mount Lemmon Survey	·	1.4 km	MPC · JPL

== 522601–522700 ==
back to top

Designation			Discovery			Properties		Ref
Permanent	Provisional	Named after	Date	Site	Discoverer(s)	Category	Diam.	Ref
522601	2016 EU_{248}	—	October 6, 2008	Mount Lemmon	Mount Lemmon Survey	·	2.1 km	MPC · JPL
522602	2016 EY_{248}	—	January 17, 2015	Mount Lemmon	Mount Lemmon Survey	EUN	1.4 km	MPC · JPL
522603	2016 EA_{249}	—	April 24, 2007	Kitt Peak	Spacewatch	·	1.7 km	MPC · JPL
522604	2016 EB_{249}	—	February 23, 2012	Mount Lemmon	Mount Lemmon Survey	PHO	750 m	MPC · JPL
522605	2016 EE_{249}	—	May 19, 2012	Mount Lemmon	Mount Lemmon Survey	KON	2.2 km	MPC · JPL
522606	2016 EF_{249}	—	February 17, 2007	Mount Lemmon	Mount Lemmon Survey	ADE	1.4 km	MPC · JPL
522607	2016 EG_{249}	—	May 21, 2012	Mount Lemmon	Mount Lemmon Survey	·	1.4 km	MPC · JPL
522608	2016 EK_{249}	—	April 27, 2012	Haleakala	Pan-STARRS 1	·	1.1 km	MPC · JPL
522609	2016 FC_{23}	—	October 3, 2013	Haleakala	Pan-STARRS 1	AGN	1.2 km	MPC · JPL
522610	2016 FP_{36}	—	March 15, 2007	Kitt Peak	Spacewatch	·	1.6 km	MPC · JPL
522611	2016 FZ_{64}	—	December 2, 2008	Kitt Peak	Spacewatch	·	2.0 km	MPC · JPL
522612	2016 FB_{65}	—	March 30, 2011	Haleakala	Pan-STARRS 1	·	1.8 km	MPC · JPL
522613	2016 FC_{65}	—	July 15, 2013	Haleakala	Pan-STARRS 1	·	920 m	MPC · JPL
522614	2016 FE_{65}	—	April 7, 2005	Kitt Peak	Spacewatch	·	2.9 km	MPC · JPL
522615	2016 FH_{65}	—	April 15, 2012	Haleakala	Pan-STARRS 1	·	980 m	MPC · JPL
522616	2016 FM_{65}	—	April 27, 2012	Haleakala	Pan-STARRS 1	·	1.3 km	MPC · JPL
522617	2016 FR_{65}	—	June 28, 2005	Kitt Peak	Spacewatch	·	1.4 km	MPC · JPL
522618	2016 FC_{66}	—	July 21, 2006	Mount Lemmon	Mount Lemmon Survey	TIR	2.1 km	MPC · JPL
522619	2016 FF_{66}	—	December 1, 2014	Haleakala	Pan-STARRS 1	·	650 m	MPC · JPL
522620	2016 FG_{66}	—	March 17, 2016	Haleakala	Pan-STARRS 1	·	870 m	MPC · JPL
522621	2016 FH_{66}	—	October 12, 2013	Mount Lemmon	Mount Lemmon Survey	·	1.3 km	MPC · JPL
522622	2016 FK_{66}	—	September 29, 2010	Mount Lemmon	Mount Lemmon Survey	·	620 m	MPC · JPL
522623	2016 FN_{66}	—	February 16, 2010	Kitt Peak	Spacewatch	·	1.9 km	MPC · JPL
522624	2016 FQ_{66}	—	January 21, 2015	Haleakala	Pan-STARRS 1	·	2.4 km	MPC · JPL
522625	2016 FR_{66}	—	August 19, 2012	Siding Spring	SSS	BRA	1.5 km	MPC · JPL
522626	2016 FS_{66}	—	December 2, 2014	Haleakala	Pan-STARRS 1	BRA	1.4 km	MPC · JPL
522627	2016 FZ_{66}	—	November 10, 2004	Kitt Peak	Spacewatch	·	2.3 km	MPC · JPL
522628	2016 FK_{67}	—	January 1, 2009	Kitt Peak	Spacewatch	·	3.3 km	MPC · JPL
522629	2016 FL_{67}	—	April 24, 2012	Mount Lemmon	Mount Lemmon Survey	EUN	780 m	MPC · JPL
522630	2016 FM_{67}	—	September 25, 2006	Catalina	CSS	·	3.3 km	MPC · JPL
522631	2016 FN_{67}	—	November 24, 2014	Haleakala	Pan-STARRS 1	·	800 m	MPC · JPL
522632	2016 FR_{67}	—	September 9, 2007	Kitt Peak	Spacewatch	·	2.3 km	MPC · JPL
522633	2016 FV_{67}	—	October 7, 2008	Mount Lemmon	Mount Lemmon Survey	·	1.7 km	MPC · JPL
522634	2016 FX_{67}	—	March 4, 2005	Kitt Peak	Spacewatch	·	2.3 km	MPC · JPL
522635	2016 FZ_{67}	—	October 16, 2009	Mount Lemmon	Mount Lemmon Survey	·	780 m	MPC · JPL
522636	2016 FA_{68}	—	March 27, 2012	Mount Lemmon	Mount Lemmon Survey	EUN	1.3 km	MPC · JPL
522637	2016 FE_{68}	—	November 19, 2014	Mount Lemmon	Mount Lemmon Survey	·	1.9 km	MPC · JPL
522638	2016 FF_{68}	—	May 29, 2011	Mount Lemmon	Mount Lemmon Survey	·	1.8 km	MPC · JPL
522639	2016 GU_{16}	—	October 7, 2007	Kitt Peak	Spacewatch	·	2.6 km	MPC · JPL
522640	2016 GW_{194}	—	October 3, 2013	Haleakala	Pan-STARRS 1	·	2.2 km	MPC · JPL
522641	2016 GH_{261}	—	November 10, 2013	Mount Lemmon	Mount Lemmon Survey	·	1.1 km	MPC · JPL
522642	2016 GT_{261}	—	April 1, 2016	Haleakala	Pan-STARRS 1	AEO	980 m	MPC · JPL
522643	2016 GU_{261}	—	March 9, 2011	Mount Lemmon	Mount Lemmon Survey	AEO	880 m	MPC · JPL
522644	2016 GX_{261}	—	November 19, 2008	Kitt Peak	Spacewatch	·	2.2 km	MPC · JPL
522645	2016 GY_{261}	—	January 22, 2015	Haleakala	Pan-STARRS 1	·	2.2 km	MPC · JPL
522646	2016 GZ_{261}	—	September 13, 2007	Kitt Peak	Spacewatch	·	640 m	MPC · JPL
522647	2016 GB_{262}	—	October 11, 2012	Kitt Peak	Spacewatch	·	2.6 km	MPC · JPL
522648	2016 GG_{262}	—	September 29, 2013	Mount Lemmon	Mount Lemmon Survey	·	1.9 km	MPC · JPL
522649	2016 GN_{262}	—	November 4, 2007	Kitt Peak	Spacewatch	·	890 m	MPC · JPL
522650	2016 GU_{262}	—	October 27, 2005	Kitt Peak	Spacewatch	·	1.2 km	MPC · JPL
522651	2016 GV_{262}	—	October 5, 2013	Kitt Peak	Spacewatch	EOS	1.7 km	MPC · JPL
522652	2016 GY_{262}	—	October 5, 2013	Haleakala	Pan-STARRS 1	·	1.1 km	MPC · JPL
522653	2016 GC_{263}	—	October 8, 2012	Haleakala	Pan-STARRS 1	TIR	2.9 km	MPC · JPL
522654	2016 GK_{263}	—	January 15, 2015	Haleakala	Pan-STARRS 1	MAR	1.0 km	MPC · JPL
522655	2016 GM_{263}	—	June 2, 2008	Mount Lemmon	Mount Lemmon Survey	·	1.6 km	MPC · JPL
522656	2016 GQ_{263}	—	September 22, 2008	Kitt Peak	Spacewatch	·	1.9 km	MPC · JPL
522657	2016 GS_{263}	—	October 9, 2013	Kitt Peak	Spacewatch	·	1.1 km	MPC · JPL
522658	2016 GT_{263}	—	August 21, 2006	Kitt Peak	Spacewatch	·	2.2 km	MPC · JPL
522659	2016 GW_{263}	—	September 20, 2007	Kitt Peak	Spacewatch	EOS	1.8 km	MPC · JPL
522660	2016 GE_{264}	—	January 14, 2015	Haleakala	Pan-STARRS 1	THM	1.9 km	MPC · JPL
522661	2016 GL_{264}	—	November 1, 2008	Mount Lemmon	Mount Lemmon Survey	·	2.0 km	MPC · JPL
522662	2016 GP_{264}	—	June 7, 2011	Haleakala	Pan-STARRS 1	·	1.3 km	MPC · JPL
522663	2016 GQ_{264}	—	March 12, 2007	Mount Lemmon	Mount Lemmon Survey	·	1.3 km	MPC · JPL
522664	2016 GU_{264}	—	January 19, 2012	Haleakala	Pan-STARRS 1	V	520 m	MPC · JPL
522665	2016 GY_{264}	—	April 30, 2006	Kitt Peak	Spacewatch	·	1.3 km	MPC · JPL
522666	2016 GZ_{264}	—	January 18, 2015	Mount Lemmon	Mount Lemmon Survey	·	1.4 km	MPC · JPL
522667	2016 GB_{265}	—	March 13, 2010	Mount Lemmon	Mount Lemmon Survey	·	2.2 km	MPC · JPL
522668	2016 GC_{265}	—	November 16, 2009	Mount Lemmon	Mount Lemmon Survey	·	1.1 km	MPC · JPL
522669	2016 GX_{265}	—	April 11, 2016	Haleakala	Pan-STARRS 1	·	1.8 km	MPC · JPL
522670	2016 GB_{266}	—	October 20, 2012	Haleakala	Pan-STARRS 1	·	2.2 km	MPC · JPL
522671	2016 GG_{266}	—	February 4, 2006	Mount Lemmon	Mount Lemmon Survey	·	1.7 km	MPC · JPL
522672	2016 GU_{266}	—	April 11, 2005	Mount Lemmon	Mount Lemmon Survey	·	3.6 km	MPC · JPL
522673	2016 GW_{266}	—	October 9, 2013	Mount Lemmon	Mount Lemmon Survey	·	1.6 km	MPC · JPL
522674	2016 GY_{266}	—	March 17, 2005	Mount Lemmon	Mount Lemmon Survey	·	1.7 km	MPC · JPL
522675	2016 GG_{267}	—	April 14, 2011	Mount Lemmon	Mount Lemmon Survey	·	2.3 km	MPC · JPL
522676	2016 GH_{267}	—	January 29, 2015	Haleakala	Pan-STARRS 1	·	2.3 km	MPC · JPL
522677	2016 GN_{267}	—	December 7, 2008	Kitt Peak	Spacewatch	·	1.9 km	MPC · JPL
522678	2016 HH_{25}	—	April 28, 2012	Mount Lemmon	Mount Lemmon Survey	·	790 m	MPC · JPL
522679	2016 HJ_{25}	—	November 9, 2013	Haleakala	Pan-STARRS 1	EOS	1.8 km	MPC · JPL
522680	2016 HL_{25}	—	January 7, 2006	Kitt Peak	Spacewatch	·	1.6 km	MPC · JPL
522681	2016 HM_{25}	—	October 4, 2008	Pla D'Arguines	R. Ferrando, M. Ferrando	·	1.4 km	MPC · JPL
522682	2016 HN_{25}	—	November 11, 2013	Kitt Peak	Spacewatch	·	1.7 km	MPC · JPL
522683	2016 HP_{25}	—	December 31, 2008	Kitt Peak	Spacewatch	·	2.5 km	MPC · JPL
522684	2016 JP	—	May 2, 2016	Catalina	CSS	ATE · PHA	210 m	MPC · JPL
522685	2016 JC_{26}	—	September 25, 2006	Kitt Peak	Spacewatch	·	2.7 km	MPC · JPL
522686	2016 JC_{41}	—	April 15, 2012	Haleakala	Pan-STARRS 1	·	1.1 km	MPC · JPL
522687	2016 JR_{41}	—	February 6, 2011	Catalina	CSS	PHO	930 m	MPC · JPL
522688	2016 KK_{5}	—	January 30, 2011	Haleakala	Pan-STARRS 1	·	1.1 km	MPC · JPL
522689	2016 KL_{5}	—	September 21, 2011	Mount Lemmon	Mount Lemmon Survey	EOS	1.5 km	MPC · JPL
522690	2016 KN_{5}	—	February 17, 2010	Kitt Peak	Spacewatch	·	1.9 km	MPC · JPL
522691	2016 KS_{5}	—	December 28, 2013	Kitt Peak	Spacewatch	VER	2.2 km	MPC · JPL
522692	2016 KT_{5}	—	May 30, 2016	Haleakala	Pan-STARRS 1	·	1.7 km	MPC · JPL
522693	2016 KX_{5}	—	April 3, 2011	Haleakala	Pan-STARRS 1	·	1.3 km	MPC · JPL
522694	2016 KZ_{5}	—	November 26, 2012	Mount Lemmon	Mount Lemmon Survey	·	2.5 km	MPC · JPL
522695	2016 LR_{2}	—	April 16, 2007	Catalina	CSS	·	2.2 km	MPC · JPL
522696	2016 LF_{59}	—	April 11, 2011	Mount Lemmon	Mount Lemmon Survey	·	1.9 km	MPC · JPL
522697	2016 LH_{59}	—	November 1, 2005	Kitt Peak	Spacewatch	·	1.0 km	MPC · JPL
522698	2016 LL_{59}	—	November 12, 2013	Catalina	CSS	EUN	1.4 km	MPC · JPL
522699	2016 LN_{59}	—	November 20, 2006	Kitt Peak	Spacewatch	·	4.2 km	MPC · JPL
522700	2016 LP_{59}	—	September 6, 2008	Mount Lemmon	Mount Lemmon Survey	·	1.7 km	MPC · JPL

== 522701–522800 ==
back to top

Designation			Discovery			Properties		Ref
Permanent	Provisional	Named after	Date	Site	Discoverer(s)	Category	Diam.	Ref
522701	2016 LQ_{59}	—	October 15, 2012	Haleakala	Pan-STARRS 1	·	1.4 km	MPC · JPL
522702	2016 LU_{59}	—	August 31, 1995	Kitt Peak	Spacewatch	·	1.9 km	MPC · JPL
522703	2016 LV_{59}	—	March 27, 2011	Mount Lemmon	Mount Lemmon Survey	·	1.7 km	MPC · JPL
522704	2016 LX_{59}	—	October 21, 2012	Haleakala	Pan-STARRS 1	·	1.5 km	MPC · JPL
522705	2016 LZ_{59}	—	April 24, 2011	Mount Lemmon	Mount Lemmon Survey	PAD	1.3 km	MPC · JPL
522706	2016 LA_{60}	—	October 6, 2012	Haleakala	Pan-STARRS 1	EOS	1.6 km	MPC · JPL
522707	2016 LD_{60}	—	April 18, 2015	Haleakala	Pan-STARRS 1	·	2.5 km	MPC · JPL
522708	2016 LK_{60}	—	October 22, 2012	Haleakala	Pan-STARRS 1	·	3.1 km	MPC · JPL
522709	2016 LO_{60}	—	October 27, 2006	Kitt Peak	Spacewatch	·	3.2 km	MPC · JPL
522710	2016 LS_{60}	—	September 23, 2011	Kitt Peak	Spacewatch	·	2.0 km	MPC · JPL
522711	2016 LT_{60}	—	January 1, 2014	Haleakala	Pan-STARRS 1	·	1.8 km	MPC · JPL
522712	2016 LV_{60}	—	August 23, 2004	Kitt Peak	Spacewatch	·	1.3 km	MPC · JPL
522713	2016 LX_{60}	—	February 23, 2012	Mount Lemmon	Mount Lemmon Survey	(2076)	580 m	MPC · JPL
522714	2016 LZ_{60}	—	October 5, 2013	Kitt Peak	Spacewatch	·	2.1 km	MPC · JPL
522715	2016 LA_{61}	—	October 7, 2005	Catalina	CSS	·	3.3 km	MPC · JPL
522716	2016 LH_{61}	—	April 18, 2015	Haleakala	Pan-STARRS 1	·	2.3 km	MPC · JPL
522717	2016 LJ_{61}	—	November 3, 2007	Kitt Peak	Spacewatch	TRE	1.7 km	MPC · JPL
522718	2016 LV_{61}	—	May 21, 2011	Haleakala	Pan-STARRS 1	·	1.6 km	MPC · JPL
522719	2016 LX_{61}	—	September 20, 2011	Mount Lemmon	Mount Lemmon Survey	·	2.5 km	MPC · JPL
522720	2016 LA_{62}	—	November 28, 2013	Kitt Peak	Spacewatch	·	1.1 km	MPC · JPL
522721	2016 LB_{62}	—	August 25, 2012	Haleakala	Pan-STARRS 1	·	1.6 km	MPC · JPL
522722	2016 LH_{62}	—	August 9, 2007	Kitt Peak	Spacewatch	·	1.9 km	MPC · JPL
522723	2016 LL_{62}	—	February 10, 2014	Haleakala	Pan-STARRS 1	·	1.8 km	MPC · JPL
522724	2016 LS_{62}	—	September 8, 2011	Kitt Peak	Spacewatch	EOS	1.6 km	MPC · JPL
522725	2016 LV_{62}	—	June 7, 2015	Mount Lemmon	Mount Lemmon Survey	·	2.5 km	MPC · JPL
522726	2016 LX_{62}	—	June 14, 2005	Kitt Peak	Spacewatch	·	2.7 km	MPC · JPL
522727	2016 LY_{62}	—	January 28, 2014	Kitt Peak	Spacewatch	·	2.1 km	MPC · JPL
522728	2016 LZ_{62}	—	October 19, 2006	Kitt Peak	Spacewatch	·	2.4 km	MPC · JPL
522729	2016 LA_{63}	—	November 28, 2013	Mount Lemmon	Mount Lemmon Survey	·	1.5 km	MPC · JPL
522730	2016 LD_{63}	—	May 24, 2011	Haleakala	Pan-STARRS 1	·	1.4 km	MPC · JPL
522731	2016 LG_{63}	—	May 28, 2008	Mount Lemmon	Mount Lemmon Survey	·	1.0 km	MPC · JPL
522732	2016 LJ_{63}	—	May 21, 2015	Haleakala	Pan-STARRS 1	EOS	1.3 km	MPC · JPL
522733	2016 LO_{63}	—	September 27, 2011	Mount Lemmon	Mount Lemmon Survey	·	3.2 km	MPC · JPL
522734	2016 LR_{63}	—	November 20, 2009	Kitt Peak	Spacewatch	HNS	1.1 km	MPC · JPL
522735	2016 LT_{63}	—	April 4, 2011	Mount Lemmon	Mount Lemmon Survey	·	1.5 km	MPC · JPL
522736	2016 LB_{64}	—	October 23, 2012	Kitt Peak	Spacewatch	·	2.8 km	MPC · JPL
522737	2016 LC_{64}	—	January 24, 2014	Haleakala	Pan-STARRS 1	·	3.4 km	MPC · JPL
522738	2016 LD_{64}	—	January 21, 2015	Haleakala	Pan-STARRS 1	·	1.3 km	MPC · JPL
522739	2016 LK_{64}	—	June 8, 2016	Haleakala	Pan-STARRS 1	·	3.1 km	MPC · JPL
522740	2016 LO_{64}	—	May 1, 2011	Haleakala	Pan-STARRS 1	·	1.3 km	MPC · JPL
522741	2016 LP_{64}	—	June 17, 2012	Mount Lemmon	Mount Lemmon Survey	·	1.7 km	MPC · JPL
522742	2016 LQ_{64}	—	September 17, 2006	Kitt Peak	Spacewatch	·	1.1 km	MPC · JPL
522743	2016 LT_{64}	—	December 3, 2008	Kitt Peak	Spacewatch	EUN	960 m	MPC · JPL
522744	2016 LV_{64}	—	July 27, 2008	La Sagra	OAM	·	1.4 km	MPC · JPL
522745	2016 MA_{4}	—	March 4, 2011	Mount Lemmon	Mount Lemmon Survey	·	1.3 km	MPC · JPL
522746	2016 MC_{4}	—	November 22, 2006	Kitt Peak	Spacewatch	·	2.1 km	MPC · JPL
522747	2016 MD_{4}	—	September 21, 2011	Mount Lemmon	Mount Lemmon Survey	·	1.9 km	MPC · JPL
522748	2016 MJ_{4}	—	November 26, 2009	Kitt Peak	Spacewatch	·	1.2 km	MPC · JPL
522749	2016 MK_{4}	—	March 21, 2015	Haleakala	Pan-STARRS 1	·	1.2 km	MPC · JPL
522750	2016 MO_{4}	—	October 22, 2012	Haleakala	Pan-STARRS 1	·	1.8 km	MPC · JPL
522751	2016 MP_{4}	—	September 25, 2006	Mount Lemmon	Mount Lemmon Survey	·	2.4 km	MPC · JPL
522752	2016 MU_{4}	—	September 20, 2011	Haleakala	Pan-STARRS 1	·	2.8 km	MPC · JPL
522753	2016 NV_{21}	—	October 10, 2012	Mount Lemmon	Mount Lemmon Survey	·	1.9 km	MPC · JPL
522754	2016 NZ_{25}	—	May 9, 2007	Kitt Peak	Spacewatch	ADE	1.6 km	MPC · JPL
522755	2016 NC_{44}	—	February 23, 2015	Haleakala	Pan-STARRS 1	·	1.9 km	MPC · JPL
522756	2016 NE_{75}	—	October 31, 2008	Kitt Peak	Spacewatch	GEF	1.3 km	MPC · JPL
522757	2016 NF_{75}	—	September 6, 2004	Siding Spring	SSS	·	1.2 km	MPC · JPL
522758	2016 NJ_{75}	—	October 16, 2012	Kitt Peak	Spacewatch	EOS	2.2 km	MPC · JPL
522759	2016 NP_{75}	—	May 18, 2015	Mount Lemmon	Mount Lemmon Survey	·	3.1 km	MPC · JPL
522760	2016 NQ_{75}	—	October 17, 2008	Kitt Peak	Spacewatch	·	1.5 km	MPC · JPL
522761	2016 NT_{75}	—	December 30, 2007	Mount Lemmon	Mount Lemmon Survey	·	2.2 km	MPC · JPL
522762	2016 NU_{75}	—	September 24, 2012	Kitt Peak	Spacewatch	·	1.4 km	MPC · JPL
522763	2016 NV_{75}	—	January 21, 2015	Haleakala	Pan-STARRS 1	·	1.1 km	MPC · JPL
522764	2016 NX_{75}	—	July 4, 2016	Haleakala	Pan-STARRS 1	·	2.5 km	MPC · JPL
522765	2016 NY_{75}	—	November 7, 2008	Mount Lemmon	Mount Lemmon Survey	NEM	1.8 km	MPC · JPL
522766	2016 NZ_{75}	—	August 3, 2011	Haleakala	Pan-STARRS 1	·	2.2 km	MPC · JPL
522767	2016 NG_{76}	—	March 25, 2015	Haleakala	Pan-STARRS 1	·	3.4 km	MPC · JPL
522768	2016 NO_{76}	—	June 12, 2011	Mount Lemmon	Mount Lemmon Survey	·	1.7 km	MPC · JPL
522769	2016 NP_{76}	—	September 21, 2012	Mount Lemmon	Mount Lemmon Survey	·	1.3 km	MPC · JPL
522770	2016 NQ_{76}	—	April 2, 2011	Haleakala	Pan-STARRS 1	EUN	1.1 km	MPC · JPL
522771	2016 NS_{76}	—	August 28, 2011	Haleakala	Pan-STARRS 1	·	1.6 km	MPC · JPL
522772	2016 NU_{76}	—	September 4, 2000	Kitt Peak	Spacewatch	·	2.2 km	MPC · JPL
522773	2016 NW_{76}	—	December 31, 2007	Kitt Peak	Spacewatch	·	3.0 km	MPC · JPL
522774	2016 NX_{76}	—	February 10, 2014	Haleakala	Pan-STARRS 1	·	1.6 km	MPC · JPL
522775	2016 NY_{76}	—	July 30, 2008	Mount Lemmon	Mount Lemmon Survey	·	920 m	MPC · JPL
522776	2016 NC_{77}	—	February 12, 2008	Mount Lemmon	Mount Lemmon Survey	·	2.7 km	MPC · JPL
522777	2016 NE_{77}	—	September 3, 2008	Kitt Peak	Spacewatch	·	1.4 km	MPC · JPL
522778	2016 NG_{77}	—	March 28, 2009	Mount Lemmon	Mount Lemmon Survey	·	2.0 km	MPC · JPL
522779	2016 NH_{77}	—	April 14, 2011	Mount Lemmon	Mount Lemmon Survey	·	1.4 km	MPC · JPL
522780	2016 NK_{77}	—	January 10, 2013	Haleakala	Pan-STARRS 1	·	2.1 km	MPC · JPL
522781	2016 NL_{77}	—	December 15, 2007	Mount Lemmon	Mount Lemmon Survey	EOS	1.7 km	MPC · JPL
522782	2016 NM_{77}	—	November 20, 2009	Mount Lemmon	Mount Lemmon Survey	·	1.7 km	MPC · JPL
522783	2016 NO_{77}	—	April 2, 2009	Mount Lemmon	Mount Lemmon Survey	·	3.3 km	MPC · JPL
522784	2016 NT_{77}	—	September 25, 2006	Kitt Peak	Spacewatch	EOS	1.4 km	MPC · JPL
522785	2016 NV_{77}	—	September 18, 2003	Kitt Peak	Spacewatch	EUN	1.2 km	MPC · JPL
522786	2016 NZ_{77}	—	September 21, 2008	Kitt Peak	Spacewatch	·	1.9 km	MPC · JPL
522787	2016 NA_{78}	—	February 24, 2014	Haleakala	Pan-STARRS 1	·	2.5 km	MPC · JPL
522788	2016 NE_{78}	—	December 3, 2007	Kitt Peak	Spacewatch	·	1.5 km	MPC · JPL
522789	2016 NF_{78}	—	January 29, 2014	Kitt Peak	Spacewatch	·	2.6 km	MPC · JPL
522790	2016 NJ_{78}	—	March 24, 2015	Mount Lemmon	Mount Lemmon Survey	·	1.2 km	MPC · JPL
522791	2016 NN_{78}	—	March 9, 2011	Mount Lemmon	Mount Lemmon Survey	·	1.0 km	MPC · JPL
522792	2016 NQ_{78}	—	December 24, 2013	Mount Lemmon	Mount Lemmon Survey	·	1.2 km	MPC · JPL
522793	2016 NW_{78}	—	September 24, 2011	Haleakala	Pan-STARRS 1	VER	2.7 km	MPC · JPL
522794	2016 NY_{78}	—	January 6, 2013	Mount Lemmon	Mount Lemmon Survey	EOS	1.9 km	MPC · JPL
522795	2016 NZ_{78}	—	August 26, 2012	Haleakala	Pan-STARRS 1	MAR	1.2 km	MPC · JPL
522796	2016 NE_{79}	—	August 27, 2011	Haleakala	Pan-STARRS 1	·	2.6 km	MPC · JPL
522797	2016 NG_{79}	—	March 29, 2015	Haleakala	Pan-STARRS 1	HYG	3.0 km	MPC · JPL
522798	2016 NM_{79}	—	February 28, 2014	Haleakala	Pan-STARRS 1	·	1.7 km	MPC · JPL
522799	2016 NN_{79}	—	October 21, 2011	Kitt Peak	Spacewatch	·	2.8 km	MPC · JPL
522800	2016 NQ_{79}	—	August 29, 2005	Kitt Peak	Spacewatch	·	2.3 km	MPC · JPL

== 522801–522900 ==
back to top

Designation			Discovery			Properties		Ref
Permanent	Provisional	Named after	Date	Site	Discoverer(s)	Category	Diam.	Ref
522801	2016 NS_{79}	—	October 13, 2006	Kitt Peak	Spacewatch	·	2.4 km	MPC · JPL
522802	2016 NU_{79}	—	February 24, 2015	Haleakala	Pan-STARRS 1	·	1.2 km	MPC · JPL
522803	2016 NW_{79}	—	October 2, 2006	Mount Lemmon	Mount Lemmon Survey	·	2.4 km	MPC · JPL
522804	2016 NC_{80}	—	October 16, 2012	Mount Lemmon	Mount Lemmon Survey	·	1.5 km	MPC · JPL
522805	2016 NF_{80}	—	June 15, 2005	Mount Lemmon	Mount Lemmon Survey	EOS	1.5 km	MPC · JPL
522806	2016 NG_{80}	—	October 26, 2009	Mount Lemmon	Mount Lemmon Survey	·	1.3 km	MPC · JPL
522807	2016 NH_{80}	—	December 31, 2008	Mount Lemmon	Mount Lemmon Survey	NEM	2.5 km	MPC · JPL
522808	2016 NL_{80}	—	April 27, 2011	Mount Lemmon	Mount Lemmon Survey	·	1.2 km	MPC · JPL
522809	2016 NM_{80}	—	May 22, 2015	Haleakala	Pan-STARRS 1	EOS	1.7 km	MPC · JPL
522810	2016 NP_{80}	—	November 1, 2006	Mount Lemmon	Mount Lemmon Survey	·	3.1 km	MPC · JPL
522811	2016 NQ_{80}	—	February 21, 2014	Kitt Peak	Spacewatch	·	2.4 km	MPC · JPL
522812	2016 NS_{80}	—	September 4, 2011	Haleakala	Pan-STARRS 1	·	2.5 km	MPC · JPL
522813	2016 NT_{80}	—	March 28, 2015	Haleakala	Pan-STARRS 1	·	1.4 km	MPC · JPL
522814	2016 NU_{80}	—	March 28, 2015	Haleakala	Pan-STARRS 1	·	2.7 km	MPC · JPL
522815	2016 ND_{81}	—	October 14, 2012	Catalina	CSS	MRX	1.1 km	MPC · JPL
522816	2016 NF_{81}	—	February 26, 2014	Mount Lemmon	Mount Lemmon Survey	·	2.7 km	MPC · JPL
522817	2016 NG_{81}	—	April 20, 2007	Kitt Peak	Spacewatch	·	1.3 km	MPC · JPL
522818	2016 NQ_{81}	—	July 12, 2005	Kitt Peak	Spacewatch	·	3.1 km	MPC · JPL
522819	2016 NS_{81}	—	October 6, 2008	Mount Lemmon	Mount Lemmon Survey	(5)	1.1 km	MPC · JPL
522820	2016 NT_{81}	—	January 1, 2008	Kitt Peak	Spacewatch	·	2.8 km	MPC · JPL
522821	2016 NW_{81}	—	February 11, 2011	Mount Lemmon	Mount Lemmon Survey	·	1.1 km	MPC · JPL
522822	2016 NY_{81}	—	January 1, 2014	Kitt Peak	Spacewatch	·	1.7 km	MPC · JPL
522823	2016 NZ_{81}	—	November 8, 2008	Mount Lemmon	Mount Lemmon Survey	·	1.3 km	MPC · JPL
522824	2016 NA_{82}	—	September 26, 2011	Haleakala	Pan-STARRS 1	THM	1.4 km	MPC · JPL
522825	2016 NC_{82}	—	October 5, 2012	Mount Lemmon	Mount Lemmon Survey	·	1.3 km	MPC · JPL
522826	2016 NH_{82}	—	December 5, 2013	Haleakala	Pan-STARRS 1	MAR	900 m	MPC · JPL
522827	2016 NJ_{82}	—	August 24, 2011	Haleakala	Pan-STARRS 1	·	2.4 km	MPC · JPL
522828	2016 NK_{82}	—	August 30, 2005	Kitt Peak	Spacewatch	·	2.4 km	MPC · JPL
522829	2016 NL_{82}	—	November 24, 2012	Kitt Peak	Spacewatch	·	1.7 km	MPC · JPL
522830	2016 NR_{82}	—	December 1, 2008	Kitt Peak	Spacewatch	·	1.4 km	MPC · JPL
522831	2016 NU_{82}	—	June 12, 2011	Mount Lemmon	Mount Lemmon Survey	EUN	1.7 km	MPC · JPL
522832	2016 NZ_{82}	—	December 12, 2012	Mount Lemmon	Mount Lemmon Survey	·	2.0 km	MPC · JPL
522833	2016 NO_{83}	—	February 9, 2008	Kitt Peak	Spacewatch	·	2.4 km	MPC · JPL
522834	2016 NQ_{83}	—	December 31, 2007	Mount Lemmon	Mount Lemmon Survey	·	2.5 km	MPC · JPL
522835	2016 NR_{83}	—	January 18, 2013	Haleakala	Pan-STARRS 1	·	2.2 km	MPC · JPL
522836	2016 NC_{84}	—	April 17, 2015	Mount Lemmon	Mount Lemmon Survey	HOF	2.0 km	MPC · JPL
522837	2016 ND_{84}	—	March 17, 2009	Kitt Peak	Spacewatch	·	2.4 km	MPC · JPL
522838	2016 NE_{84}	—	September 19, 2011	Haleakala	Pan-STARRS 1	·	2.7 km	MPC · JPL
522839	2016 NH_{84}	—	February 9, 2008	Kitt Peak	Spacewatch	·	660 m	MPC · JPL
522840	2016 NL_{84}	—	September 23, 2008	Mount Lemmon	Mount Lemmon Survey	·	1.5 km	MPC · JPL
522841	2016 NO_{84}	—	September 21, 2012	Kitt Peak	Spacewatch	·	1.1 km	MPC · JPL
522842	2016 NS_{84}	—	February 18, 2014	Mount Lemmon	Mount Lemmon Survey	·	2.2 km	MPC · JPL
522843	2016 NT_{84}	—	July 11, 2016	Haleakala	Pan-STARRS 1	PHO	930 m	MPC · JPL
522844	2016 NA_{85}	—	December 22, 2008	Kitt Peak	Spacewatch	·	1.9 km	MPC · JPL
522845	2016 NF_{85}	—	December 30, 2013	Mount Lemmon	Mount Lemmon Survey	·	930 m	MPC · JPL
522846	2016 NK_{85}	—	September 18, 2007	Anderson Mesa	LONEOS	AEO	1.1 km	MPC · JPL
522847	2016 NU_{85}	—	December 2, 2005	Kitt Peak	Spacewatch	·	1.6 km	MPC · JPL
522848	2016 NW_{85}	—	October 5, 2012	Kitt Peak	Spacewatch	·	1.1 km	MPC · JPL
522849	2016 ND_{86}	—	May 27, 2015	Mount Lemmon	Mount Lemmon Survey	EOS	1.5 km	MPC · JPL
522850	2016 NF_{86}	—	November 12, 2012	Mount Lemmon	Mount Lemmon Survey	·	1.9 km	MPC · JPL
522851	2016 NH_{86}	—	February 11, 2014	Mount Lemmon	Mount Lemmon Survey	·	2.5 km	MPC · JPL
522852	2016 NL_{86}	—	February 20, 2015	Haleakala	Pan-STARRS 1	·	980 m	MPC · JPL
522853	2016 NM_{86}	—	January 1, 2008	Kitt Peak	Spacewatch	EOS	1.7 km	MPC · JPL
522854	2016 NO_{86}	—	July 12, 2016	Mount Lemmon	Mount Lemmon Survey	·	1.9 km	MPC · JPL
522855	2016 NP_{86}	—	September 26, 2008	Kitt Peak	Spacewatch	·	1.1 km	MPC · JPL
522856	2016 NU_{86}	—	February 3, 2009	Kitt Peak	Spacewatch	BRA	1.3 km	MPC · JPL
522857	2016 NX_{86}	—	December 14, 2013	Mount Lemmon	Mount Lemmon Survey	·	1.6 km	MPC · JPL
522858	2016 NC_{87}	—	September 25, 2006	Kitt Peak	Spacewatch	·	1.4 km	MPC · JPL
522859	2016 NF_{87}	—	March 21, 2015	Haleakala	Pan-STARRS 1	·	1.3 km	MPC · JPL
522860	2016 NJ_{87}	—	September 24, 2011	Haleakala	Pan-STARRS 1	·	2.2 km	MPC · JPL
522861	2016 NN_{87}	—	September 21, 2004	Kitt Peak	Spacewatch	·	1.1 km	MPC · JPL
522862	2016 NS_{87}	—	March 17, 2015	Haleakala	Pan-STARRS 1	·	2.2 km	MPC · JPL
522863	2016 NV_{87}	—	October 20, 2008	Kitt Peak	Spacewatch	·	1.5 km	MPC · JPL
522864	2016 NC_{88}	—	October 4, 2007	Kitt Peak	Spacewatch	KOR	1.0 km	MPC · JPL
522865	2016 NE_{88}	—	July 14, 2016	Haleakala	Pan-STARRS 1	·	1.8 km	MPC · JPL
522866	2016 NG_{88}	—	July 14, 2016	Haleakala	Pan-STARRS 1	·	2.0 km	MPC · JPL
522867	2016 NM_{88}	—	March 28, 2015	Haleakala	Pan-STARRS 1	·	1.8 km	MPC · JPL
522868	2016 NN_{88}	—	September 13, 2005	Kitt Peak	Spacewatch	THM	2.0 km	MPC · JPL
522869	2016 NW_{88}	—	August 10, 2007	Kitt Peak	Spacewatch	·	1.9 km	MPC · JPL
522870	2016 NM_{89}	—	October 8, 2012	Haleakala	Pan-STARRS 1	·	1.5 km	MPC · JPL
522871	2016 NS_{89}	—	November 19, 2006	Kitt Peak	Spacewatch	·	1.6 km	MPC · JPL
522872	2016 NX_{89}	—	May 23, 2006	Kitt Peak	Spacewatch	·	1.7 km	MPC · JPL
522873	2016 ND_{90}	—	February 13, 2004	Kitt Peak	Spacewatch	·	1.0 km	MPC · JPL
522874	2016 OR_{5}	—	October 11, 2005	Anderson Mesa	LONEOS	H	540 m	MPC · JPL
522875	2016 OE_{7}	—	September 14, 2013	Haleakala	Pan-STARRS 1	MAR	1.3 km	MPC · JPL
522876	2016 OF_{7}	—	June 13, 2010	Mount Lemmon	Mount Lemmon Survey	·	3.3 km	MPC · JPL
522877	2016 OG_{7}	—	March 22, 2015	Haleakala	Pan-STARRS 1	EUN	1.1 km	MPC · JPL
522878	2016 OK_{7}	—	February 9, 2007	Kitt Peak	Spacewatch	VER	2.6 km	MPC · JPL
522879	2016 OL_{7}	—	October 25, 2011	Kitt Peak	Spacewatch	EOS	1.8 km	MPC · JPL
522880	2016 OM_{7}	—	July 2, 2011	Mount Lemmon	Mount Lemmon Survey	·	1.3 km	MPC · JPL
522881	2016 OO_{7}	—	September 10, 2010	Mount Lemmon	Mount Lemmon Survey	·	3.2 km	MPC · JPL
522882	2016 OP_{7}	—	November 17, 2011	Kitt Peak	Spacewatch	EOS	1.7 km	MPC · JPL
522883	2016 OT_{7}	—	September 15, 2007	Kitt Peak	Spacewatch	·	1.6 km	MPC · JPL
522884	2016 OU_{7}	—	January 16, 2013	Mount Lemmon	Mount Lemmon Survey	·	2.0 km	MPC · JPL
522885	2016 OW_{7}	—	September 13, 2005	Catalina	CSS	T_{j} (2.96)	3.8 km	MPC · JPL
522886	2016 OD_{8}	—	September 21, 2009	Kitt Peak	Spacewatch	V	590 m	MPC · JPL
522887	2016 OH_{8}	—	May 21, 2010	Mount Lemmon	Mount Lemmon Survey	·	2.2 km	MPC · JPL
522888	2016 OJ_{8}	—	November 7, 2007	Mount Lemmon	Mount Lemmon Survey	·	2.1 km	MPC · JPL
522889	2016 OP_{8}	—	October 23, 2008	Kitt Peak	Spacewatch	·	1.3 km	MPC · JPL
522890	2016 OQ_{8}	—	October 8, 2012	Haleakala	Pan-STARRS 1	·	1.3 km	MPC · JPL
522891	2016 OS_{8}	—	September 24, 2011	Haleakala	Pan-STARRS 1	·	2.7 km	MPC · JPL
522892	2016 OU_{8}	—	April 22, 2015	Kitt Peak	Spacewatch	·	1.6 km	MPC · JPL
522893	2016 OW_{8}	—	February 3, 2009	Kitt Peak	Spacewatch	EOS	2.0 km	MPC · JPL
522894	2016 PW_{1}	—	January 6, 2010	Kitt Peak	Spacewatch	H	500 m	MPC · JPL
522895	2016 PV_{103}	—	October 19, 2006	Kitt Peak	Spacewatch	·	2.0 km	MPC · JPL
522896	2016 PC_{104}	—	February 19, 2009	Kitt Peak	Spacewatch	·	1.8 km	MPC · JPL
522897	2016 PJ_{104}	—	December 16, 2004	Kitt Peak	Spacewatch	·	1.5 km	MPC · JPL
522898	2016 PK_{104}	—	November 11, 2007	Mount Lemmon	Mount Lemmon Survey	·	2.0 km	MPC · JPL
522899	2016 PM_{104}	—	October 4, 2004	Kitt Peak	Spacewatch	CYB	3.1 km	MPC · JPL
522900	2016 PT_{104}	—	December 22, 2012	Haleakala	Pan-STARRS 1	·	1.7 km	MPC · JPL

== 522901–523000 ==
back to top

Designation			Discovery			Properties		Ref
Permanent	Provisional	Named after	Date	Site	Discoverer(s)	Category	Diam.	Ref
522901	2016 PY_{104}	—	December 19, 2007	Kitt Peak	Spacewatch	·	1.9 km	MPC · JPL
522902	2016 PB_{105}	—	February 27, 2008	Kitt Peak	Spacewatch	·	2.8 km	MPC · JPL
522903	2016 PF_{105}	—	April 18, 2009	Kitt Peak	Spacewatch	·	3.0 km	MPC · JPL
522904	2016 PG_{105}	—	September 24, 2011	Haleakala	Pan-STARRS 1	·	1.8 km	MPC · JPL
522905	2016 PB_{106}	—	March 26, 2014	Mount Lemmon	Mount Lemmon Survey	·	2.5 km	MPC · JPL
522906	2016 PP_{106}	—	January 26, 2015	Haleakala	Pan-STARRS 1	·	1.3 km	MPC · JPL
522907	2016 PK_{107}	—	September 28, 2006	Kitt Peak	Spacewatch	EOS	1.6 km	MPC · JPL
522908	2016 PL_{107}	—	November 7, 2010	Mount Lemmon	Mount Lemmon Survey	V	500 m	MPC · JPL
522909	2016 PM_{107}	—	September 22, 2011	Kitt Peak	Spacewatch	·	2.5 km	MPC · JPL
522910	2016 PN_{107}	—	March 28, 2015	Haleakala	Pan-STARRS 1	·	2.0 km	MPC · JPL
522911	2016 PZ_{107}	—	January 26, 2014	Catalina	CSS	(5)	1.3 km	MPC · JPL
522912	2016 PK_{108}	—	November 20, 2006	Kitt Peak	Spacewatch	·	2.4 km	MPC · JPL
522913	2016 PL_{108}	—	May 21, 2015	Haleakala	Pan-STARRS 1	·	1.7 km	MPC · JPL
522914	2016 PM_{108}	—	February 24, 2014	Haleakala	Pan-STARRS 1	EOS	1.8 km	MPC · JPL
522915	2016 PO_{108}	—	October 26, 2013	Mount Lemmon	Mount Lemmon Survey	·	620 m	MPC · JPL
522916	2016 PP_{108}	—	August 2, 2016	Haleakala	Pan-STARRS 1	·	2.5 km	MPC · JPL
522917	2016 PS_{108}	—	September 24, 2011	Haleakala	Pan-STARRS 1	·	2.5 km	MPC · JPL
522918	2016 PV_{108}	—	September 30, 2011	Kitt Peak	Spacewatch	·	2.9 km	MPC · JPL
522919	2016 PX_{108}	—	March 6, 2008	Mount Lemmon	Mount Lemmon Survey	·	1.1 km	MPC · JPL
522920	2016 PB_{109}	—	October 17, 2012	Haleakala	Pan-STARRS 1	·	1.6 km	MPC · JPL
522921	2016 PF_{109}	—	September 28, 2009	Kitt Peak	Spacewatch	·	1.1 km	MPC · JPL
522922	2016 PT_{109}	—	April 19, 2009	Mount Lemmon	Mount Lemmon Survey	·	2.3 km	MPC · JPL
522923	2016 PA_{110}	—	October 22, 2011	Mount Lemmon	Mount Lemmon Survey	·	2.4 km	MPC · JPL
522924	2016 PK_{110}	—	October 25, 2011	Haleakala	Pan-STARRS 1	CYB	3.6 km	MPC · JPL
522925	2016 PS_{110}	—	September 17, 2006	Kitt Peak	Spacewatch	EOS	1.8 km	MPC · JPL
522926	2016 PJ_{111}	—	November 3, 2011	Mount Lemmon	Mount Lemmon Survey	·	2.3 km	MPC · JPL
522927	2016 PP_{111}	—	October 14, 2012	Kitt Peak	Spacewatch	·	1.1 km	MPC · JPL
522928	2016 PS_{111}	—	September 22, 2012	Kitt Peak	Spacewatch	·	910 m	MPC · JPL
522929	2016 PT_{111}	—	October 22, 2012	Haleakala	Pan-STARRS 1	·	1.6 km	MPC · JPL
522930	2016 PU_{111}	—	February 26, 2014	Haleakala	Pan-STARRS 1	·	1.1 km	MPC · JPL
522931	2016 PW_{111}	—	May 19, 2015	Haleakala	Pan-STARRS 1	·	1.6 km	MPC · JPL
522932	2016 PX_{111}	—	March 5, 2011	Kitt Peak	Spacewatch	(2076)	900 m	MPC · JPL
522933	2016 PY_{111}	—	August 26, 2005	Campo Imperatore	CINEOS	·	2.9 km	MPC · JPL
522934	2016 PZ_{111}	—	August 13, 2012	Haleakala	Pan-STARRS 1	·	1.3 km	MPC · JPL
522935	2016 PC_{112}	—	March 17, 2004	Kitt Peak	Spacewatch	KOR	1.4 km	MPC · JPL
522936	2016 PF_{112}	—	October 28, 2011	Kitt Peak	Spacewatch	·	1.7 km	MPC · JPL
522937	2016 PH_{112}	—	November 26, 2012	Mount Lemmon	Mount Lemmon Survey	·	1.5 km	MPC · JPL
522938	2016 PQ_{112}	—	November 23, 2012	Kitt Peak	Spacewatch	·	1.4 km	MPC · JPL
522939	2016 PS_{112}	—	February 26, 2014	Mount Lemmon	Mount Lemmon Survey	AGN	1.3 km	MPC · JPL
522940	2016 PT_{112}	—	March 22, 2009	Mount Lemmon	Mount Lemmon Survey	KOR	1.4 km	MPC · JPL
522941	2016 PV_{112}	—	October 21, 2012	Mount Lemmon	Mount Lemmon Survey	·	1.3 km	MPC · JPL
522942	2016 PX_{112}	—	October 23, 2011	Haleakala	Pan-STARRS 1	·	2.8 km	MPC · JPL
522943	2016 PY_{112}	—	March 19, 2010	Mount Lemmon	Mount Lemmon Survey	·	1.6 km	MPC · JPL
522944	2016 PB_{113}	—	January 10, 2007	Mount Lemmon	Mount Lemmon Survey	V	580 m	MPC · JPL
522945	2016 PC_{113}	—	January 20, 2008	Kitt Peak	Spacewatch	·	2.5 km	MPC · JPL
522946	2016 PD_{113}	—	November 14, 2012	Kitt Peak	Spacewatch	·	1.4 km	MPC · JPL
522947	2016 PE_{113}	—	June 10, 2015	Haleakala	Pan-STARRS 1	·	1.9 km	MPC · JPL
522948	2016 PF_{113}	—	March 24, 2009	Mount Lemmon	Mount Lemmon Survey	·	3.0 km	MPC · JPL
522949	2016 PM_{113}	—	February 22, 2014	Kitt Peak	Spacewatch	·	1.1 km	MPC · JPL
522950	2016 PO_{113}	—	February 10, 2008	Kitt Peak	Spacewatch	VER	2.4 km	MPC · JPL
522951	2016 PY_{113}	—	March 13, 2008	Kitt Peak	Spacewatch	·	2.6 km	MPC · JPL
522952	2016 PZ_{113}	—	December 1, 2008	Kitt Peak	Spacewatch	(5)	1.1 km	MPC · JPL
522953	2016 PB_{114}	—	August 28, 2005	Kitt Peak	Spacewatch	EOS	1.7 km	MPC · JPL
522954	2016 PE_{114}	—	October 24, 2011	Kitt Peak	Spacewatch	·	2.5 km	MPC · JPL
522955	2016 PF_{114}	—	May 26, 2011	Mount Lemmon	Mount Lemmon Survey	·	1.0 km	MPC · JPL
522956	2016 PH_{114}	—	September 15, 2007	Mount Lemmon	Mount Lemmon Survey	·	1.6 km	MPC · JPL
522957	2016 PM_{114}	—	September 25, 2012	Mount Lemmon	Mount Lemmon Survey	·	1.0 km	MPC · JPL
522958	2016 PP_{114}	—	September 19, 2006	Kitt Peak	Spacewatch	KOR	1.1 km	MPC · JPL
522959	2016 PR_{114}	—	September 29, 2008	Mount Lemmon	Mount Lemmon Survey	·	1.2 km	MPC · JPL
522960	2016 PX_{114}	—	October 17, 2012	Haleakala	Pan-STARRS 1	·	1.2 km	MPC · JPL
522961	2016 PY_{114}	—	January 18, 2013	Mount Lemmon	Mount Lemmon Survey	·	2.2 km	MPC · JPL
522962	2016 PZ_{114}	—	October 26, 2012	Haleakala	Pan-STARRS 1	EUN	1.0 km	MPC · JPL
522963	2016 PK_{115}	—	January 1, 2014	Haleakala	Pan-STARRS 1	·	1.5 km	MPC · JPL
522964	2016 PM_{115}	—	January 24, 2014	Haleakala	Pan-STARRS 1	·	1.6 km	MPC · JPL
522965	2016 PO_{115}	—	March 13, 2011	Mount Lemmon	Mount Lemmon Survey	·	1.1 km	MPC · JPL
522966	2016 PR_{115}	—	November 6, 2008	Mount Lemmon	Mount Lemmon Survey	NEM	2.3 km	MPC · JPL
522967	2016 PW_{115}	—	January 3, 2013	Mount Lemmon	Mount Lemmon Survey	·	2.5 km	MPC · JPL
522968	2016 PX_{115}	—	August 30, 2011	Haleakala	Pan-STARRS 1	·	2.4 km	MPC · JPL
522969	2016 PA_{116}	—	September 11, 2007	Kitt Peak	Spacewatch	AGN	1.1 km	MPC · JPL
522970	2016 PD_{116}	—	October 2, 2006	Mount Lemmon	Mount Lemmon Survey	·	2.0 km	MPC · JPL
522971	2016 PF_{116}	—	September 16, 2012	Kitt Peak	Spacewatch	·	1.9 km	MPC · JPL
522972	2016 PH_{116}	—	September 9, 2004	Kitt Peak	Spacewatch	·	870 m	MPC · JPL
522973	2016 PL_{116}	—	January 29, 2014	Kitt Peak	Spacewatch	EOS	1.9 km	MPC · JPL
522974	2016 PU_{116}	—	March 17, 2015	Haleakala	Pan-STARRS 1	·	1.9 km	MPC · JPL
522975	2016 PX_{116}	—	January 4, 2011	Mount Lemmon	Mount Lemmon Survey	·	740 m	MPC · JPL
522976	2016 PP_{117}	—	January 29, 2014	Kitt Peak	Spacewatch	·	1.8 km	MPC · JPL
522977	2016 PS_{117}	—	October 21, 2008	Kitt Peak	Spacewatch	·	1.2 km	MPC · JPL
522978	2016 PA_{118}	—	August 16, 2009	Kitt Peak	Spacewatch	·	930 m	MPC · JPL
522979	2016 PD_{118}	—	December 8, 2012	Kitt Peak	Spacewatch	·	1.9 km	MPC · JPL
522980	2016 PE_{118}	—	November 19, 2008	Mount Lemmon	Mount Lemmon Survey	·	1.1 km	MPC · JPL
522981	2016 PJ_{118}	—	October 23, 2012	Mount Lemmon	Mount Lemmon Survey	EOS	1.7 km	MPC · JPL
522982	2016 PS_{118}	—	October 14, 2012	Catalina	CSS	·	2.1 km	MPC · JPL
522983	2016 PV_{118}	—	December 28, 2013	Mount Lemmon	Mount Lemmon Survey	·	1.2 km	MPC · JPL
522984	2016 PX_{118}	—	November 17, 2007	Kitt Peak	Spacewatch	·	1.6 km	MPC · JPL
522985	2016 PA_{119}	—	January 16, 2013	Haleakala	Pan-STARRS 1	VER	2.1 km	MPC · JPL
522986	2016 PB_{119}	—	March 25, 2015	Haleakala	Pan-STARRS 1	MAR	770 m	MPC · JPL
522987	2016 PD_{119}	—	August 7, 2016	Haleakala	Pan-STARRS 1	·	930 m	MPC · JPL
522988	2016 PL_{119}	—	April 4, 2014	Mount Lemmon	Mount Lemmon Survey	·	2.6 km	MPC · JPL
522989	2016 PU_{119}	—	January 6, 2013	Kitt Peak	Spacewatch	·	2.5 km	MPC · JPL
522990	2016 PY_{119}	—	May 2, 2010	WISE	WISE	·	2.2 km	MPC · JPL
522991	2016 PA_{120}	—	September 28, 2011	Kitt Peak	Spacewatch	·	2.2 km	MPC · JPL
522992	2016 PD_{120}	—	January 26, 2006	Catalina	CSS	·	1.8 km	MPC · JPL
522993	2016 PL_{120}	—	November 20, 2006	Kitt Peak	Spacewatch	·	2.6 km	MPC · JPL
522994	2016 PO_{120}	—	August 8, 2016	Haleakala	Pan-STARRS 1	AST	1.3 km	MPC · JPL
522995	2016 PQ_{120}	—	March 5, 2008	Mount Lemmon	Mount Lemmon Survey	VER	2.1 km	MPC · JPL
522996	2016 PT_{120}	—	April 19, 2009	Mount Lemmon	Mount Lemmon Survey	·	2.7 km	MPC · JPL
522997	2016 PV_{120}	—	May 21, 2015	Haleakala	Pan-STARRS 1	·	2.0 km	MPC · JPL
522998	2016 PZ_{120}	—	September 4, 2011	Haleakala	Pan-STARRS 1	·	2.3 km	MPC · JPL
522999	2016 PE_{121}	—	September 28, 2011	Mount Lemmon	Mount Lemmon Survey	·	1.8 km	MPC · JPL
523000	2016 PG_{121}	—	October 25, 2012	Mount Lemmon	Mount Lemmon Survey	·	1.4 km	MPC · JPL

back to top

== Meaning of names ==
As minor planet discoveries are confirmed, they are given a permanent number by the IAU's Minor Planet Center (MPC), and the discoverers can then submit names for them, following the IAU's naming conventions. The list below concerns those minor planets in the specified number-range that have received names, and explains the meanings of those names.

Official naming citations of newly named small Solar System bodies are approved and published in a bulletin by IAU's Working Group for Small Bodies Nomenclature (WGSBN). Before May 2021, citations were published in MPC's Minor Planet Circulars for many decades. Recent citations can also be found on the JPL Small-Body Database (SBDB). Until his death in 2016, German astronomer Lutz D. Schmadel compiled these citations into the Dictionary of Minor Planet Names (DMP) and regularly updated the collection.

Based on Paul Herget's The Names of the Minor Planets, Schmadel also researched the unclear origin of numerous asteroids, most of which had been named prior to World War II. This article incorporates text from this source, which is in the public domain: SBDB New namings may only be added to this list below after official publication as the preannouncement of names is condemned. The WGSBN publishes a comprehensive guideline for the naming rules of non-cometary small Solar System bodies.

Named minor planet	Provisional	This minor planet was named for...	Ref · Catalog
522466 Auyeung	2016 CU_{321}	John Auyeung (b. 1952), an American physicist.	IAU · 522466
522563 Randyflynn	2016 EV_{243}	Randy L. Flynn (born 1963), is an American amateur astronomer who operates the Squirrel Valley Observatory (W34) in western North Carolina. Randy submits important follow-up observations of Near-Earth Asteroids to the Minor Planet Center and was awarded the Shoemaker NEO Grant in 2019 to help further his efforts (Src).	JPL · 522563
