= List of minor planets: 518001–519000 =

The following is a partial list of minor planets, running from minor-planet number 518001 through 519000, inclusive. The primary data for this and other partial lists is based on JPL's "Small-Body Orbital Elements" and data available from the Minor Planet Center. Critical list information is also provided by the MPC, unless otherwise specified from Lowell Observatory. A detailed description of the table's columns and additional sources are given on the main page including a complete list of every page in this series, and a statistical break-up on the dynamical classification of minor planets.

Also see the summary list of all named bodies in numerical and alphabetical order, and the corresponding naming citations for the number range of this particular list. New namings may only be added to this list after official publication, as the preannouncement of names is condemned by the Working Group for Small Bodies Nomenclature of the International Astronomical Union.

Near-Earth obj.	MBA (inner)	MBA (outer)	Centaur
Mars-crosser	MBA (middle)	Jupiter trojan	Trans-Neptunian obj.
Unclassified

== 518001–518100 ==
Designation			Discovery			Properties		Ref
Permanent	Provisional	Named after	Date	Site	Discoverer(s)	Category	Diam.	Ref
518001	2015 UT_{87}	—	June 26, 2014	Kitt Peak	Spacewatch	·	3.0 km	MPC · JPL
518002	2015 VM_{5}	—	September 23, 2015	Haleakala	Pan-STARRS 1	·	1.7 km	MPC · JPL
518003	2015 VC_{32}	—	October 14, 2004	Kitt Peak	Spacewatch	·	2.6 km	MPC · JPL
518004	2015 VZ_{35}	—	October 12, 2005	Kitt Peak	Spacewatch	·	1.6 km	MPC · JPL
518005	2015 VA_{37}	—	September 20, 2006	Catalina	CSS	EUN	1.1 km	MPC · JPL
518006	2015 VU_{39}	—	October 29, 2010	Mount Lemmon	Mount Lemmon Survey	·	2.3 km	MPC · JPL
518007	2015 VQ_{41}	—	July 17, 2010	Siding Spring	SSS	·	1.8 km	MPC · JPL
518008	2015 VQ_{51}	—	March 22, 2014	Mount Lemmon	Mount Lemmon Survey	PHO	1.0 km	MPC · JPL
518009	2015 VL_{55}	—	May 28, 2008	Mount Lemmon	Mount Lemmon Survey	EOS	1.8 km	MPC · JPL
518010	2015 VJ_{61}	—	June 7, 2008	Kitt Peak	Spacewatch	·	2.4 km	MPC · JPL
518011	2015 VF_{81}	—	January 23, 2006	Kitt Peak	Spacewatch	·	2.5 km	MPC · JPL
518012	2015 VY_{83}	—	May 7, 2014	Haleakala	Pan-STARRS 1	·	1.9 km	MPC · JPL
518013	2015 VN_{93}	—	October 7, 2004	Kitt Peak	Spacewatch	·	2.7 km	MPC · JPL
518014	2015 VR_{94}	—	November 4, 2004	Catalina	CSS	EOS	2.4 km	MPC · JPL
518015	2015 VK_{110}	—	December 31, 2011	Kitt Peak	Spacewatch	·	1.8 km	MPC · JPL
518016	2015 VQ_{114}	—	March 26, 2007	Mount Lemmon	Mount Lemmon Survey	·	2.7 km	MPC · JPL
518017	2015 VM_{119}	—	June 24, 2014	Haleakala	Pan-STARRS 1	·	2.4 km	MPC · JPL
518018	2015 VN_{137}	—	September 20, 2009	Mount Lemmon	Mount Lemmon Survey	·	2.9 km	MPC · JPL
518019	2015 VS_{137}	—	October 29, 1999	Kitt Peak	Spacewatch	EOS	1.8 km	MPC · JPL
518020	2015 VD_{144}	—	April 11, 2010	Mount Lemmon	Mount Lemmon Survey	·	1.4 km	MPC · JPL
518021	2015 VL_{149}	—	January 30, 2006	Kitt Peak	Spacewatch	·	2.8 km	MPC · JPL
518022	2015 VT_{150}	—	December 14, 2010	Kitt Peak	Spacewatch	·	3.2 km	MPC · JPL
518023	2015 VP_{154}	—	May 12, 1996	Kitt Peak	Spacewatch	·	3.0 km	MPC · JPL
518024	2015 VQ_{155}	—	January 23, 2006	Mount Lemmon	Mount Lemmon Survey	·	2.4 km	MPC · JPL
518025	2015 VV_{155}	—	October 2, 2006	Mount Lemmon	Mount Lemmon Survey	·	1.6 km	MPC · JPL
518026	2015 VG_{156}	—	April 26, 2007	Mount Lemmon	Mount Lemmon Survey	·	2.5 km	MPC · JPL
518027	2015 VS_{156}	—	November 16, 1998	Kitt Peak	Spacewatch	·	1.6 km	MPC · JPL
518028	2015 VE_{157}	—	January 4, 2013	Kitt Peak	Spacewatch	·	840 m	MPC · JPL
518029	2015 VH_{157}	—	September 1, 2014	Mount Lemmon	Mount Lemmon Survey	EOS	1.6 km	MPC · JPL
518030	2015 VK_{157}	—	September 29, 2009	Mount Lemmon	Mount Lemmon Survey	VER	2.5 km	MPC · JPL
518031	2015 WQ_{18}	—	July 2, 2014	Haleakala	Pan-STARRS 1	·	820 m	MPC · JPL
518032	2015 WX_{18}	—	October 10, 2010	Mount Lemmon	Mount Lemmon Survey	·	2.3 km	MPC · JPL
518033	2015 XE_{7}	—	March 16, 2012	Haleakala	Pan-STARRS 1	·	2.6 km	MPC · JPL
518034	2015 XL_{12}	—	June 14, 2010	Mount Lemmon	Mount Lemmon Survey	·	2.1 km	MPC · JPL
518035	2015 XP_{14}	—	November 1, 2015	Kitt Peak	Spacewatch	·	2.2 km	MPC · JPL
518036	2015 XF_{41}	—	June 28, 2014	Haleakala	Pan-STARRS 1	·	2.4 km	MPC · JPL
518037	2015 XA_{57}	—	June 29, 2014	Mount Lemmon	Mount Lemmon Survey	·	2.5 km	MPC · JPL
518038	2015 XF_{58}	—	April 14, 2013	Mount Lemmon	Mount Lemmon Survey	·	3.0 km	MPC · JPL
518039	2015 XB_{60}	—	August 22, 2014	Haleakala	Pan-STARRS 1	·	2.8 km	MPC · JPL
518040	2015 XL_{63}	—	April 16, 2012	Haleakala	Pan-STARRS 1	·	2.9 km	MPC · JPL
518041	2015 XQ_{65}	—	May 7, 2008	Kitt Peak	Spacewatch	EOS	1.6 km	MPC · JPL
518042	2015 XO_{66}	—	November 12, 2006	Mount Lemmon	Mount Lemmon Survey	AEO	1.7 km	MPC · JPL
518043	2015 XB_{68}	—	June 3, 2005	Kitt Peak	Spacewatch	ADE	1.6 km	MPC · JPL
518044	2015 XA_{69}	—	September 19, 2006	Kitt Peak	Spacewatch	·	1.6 km	MPC · JPL
518045	2015 XT_{92}	—	October 14, 2010	Mount Lemmon	Mount Lemmon Survey	EOS	2.4 km	MPC · JPL
518046	2015 XB_{93}	—	September 18, 2003	Kitt Peak	Spacewatch	·	2.4 km	MPC · JPL
518047	2015 XT_{100}	—	September 16, 2009	Kitt Peak	Spacewatch	EOS	1.5 km	MPC · JPL
518048	2015 XX_{108}	—	April 28, 2012	Mount Lemmon	Mount Lemmon Survey	·	2.9 km	MPC · JPL
518049	2015 XA_{110}	—	April 25, 2007	Mount Lemmon	Mount Lemmon Survey	VER	2.5 km	MPC · JPL
518050	2015 XB_{114}	—	June 4, 2014	Haleakala	Pan-STARRS 1	·	1.5 km	MPC · JPL
518051	2015 XF_{134}	—	October 16, 2006	Catalina	CSS	·	2.1 km	MPC · JPL
518052	2015 XJ_{136}	—	November 17, 1998	Kitt Peak	Spacewatch	VER	2.4 km	MPC · JPL
518053	2015 XF_{166}	—	December 5, 2015	Haleakala	Pan-STARRS 1	·	3.0 km	MPC · JPL
518054	2015 XT_{194}	—	September 27, 2009	Mount Lemmon	Mount Lemmon Survey	EOS	2.3 km	MPC · JPL
518055	2015 XC_{201}	—	July 29, 2014	Haleakala	Pan-STARRS 1	(260) · CYB	3.2 km	MPC · JPL
518056	2015 XN_{220}	—	July 30, 2014	Kitt Peak	Spacewatch	·	1.8 km	MPC · JPL
518057	2015 XF_{254}	—	May 15, 2008	Mount Lemmon	Mount Lemmon Survey	·	3.5 km	MPC · JPL
518058	2015 XW_{275}	—	May 16, 2013	Mount Lemmon	Mount Lemmon Survey	EOS	2.0 km	MPC · JPL
518059	2015 XQ_{279}	—	December 14, 2010	Mount Lemmon	Mount Lemmon Survey	·	1.8 km	MPC · JPL
518060	2015 XT_{292}	—	October 24, 2009	Mount Lemmon	Mount Lemmon Survey	·	3.1 km	MPC · JPL
518061	2015 XZ_{292}	—	August 18, 2014	Haleakala	Pan-STARRS 1	·	2.3 km	MPC · JPL
518062	2015 XH_{294}	—	November 8, 2010	Mount Lemmon	Mount Lemmon Survey	EOS	2.0 km	MPC · JPL
518063	2015 XU_{334}	—	February 27, 2012	Haleakala	Pan-STARRS 1	·	2.9 km	MPC · JPL
518064	2015 XN_{342}	—	January 10, 2011	Mount Lemmon	Mount Lemmon Survey	·	2.8 km	MPC · JPL
518065	2015 XL_{360}	—	May 11, 2007	Mount Lemmon	Mount Lemmon Survey	·	2.8 km	MPC · JPL
518066	2015 XY_{376}	—	September 17, 2009	Kitt Peak	Spacewatch	·	2.8 km	MPC · JPL
518067	2015 XT_{380}	—	April 15, 2013	Haleakala	Pan-STARRS 1	·	2.5 km	MPC · JPL
518068	2015 XE_{397}	—	May 11, 2007	Mount Lemmon	Mount Lemmon Survey	VER	2.5 km	MPC · JPL
518069	2015 XG_{399}	—	November 7, 2008	Mount Lemmon	Mount Lemmon Survey	·	720 m	MPC · JPL
518070	2015 XH_{399}	—	October 9, 2008	Mount Lemmon	Mount Lemmon Survey	EOS	1.5 km	MPC · JPL
518071	2015 XK_{399}	—	August 15, 2013	Haleakala	Pan-STARRS 1	·	2.4 km	MPC · JPL
518072	2015 XS_{399}	—	February 27, 2012	Haleakala	Pan-STARRS 1	·	1.1 km	MPC · JPL
518073	2015 XB_{400}	—	September 23, 2008	Mount Lemmon	Mount Lemmon Survey	ARM	3.0 km	MPC · JPL
518074	2015 XD_{400}	—	April 19, 2006	Kitt Peak	Spacewatch	·	1.9 km	MPC · JPL
518075	2015 YD_{11}	—	July 25, 2015	Haleakala	Pan-STARRS 1	·	3.1 km	MPC · JPL
518076	2015 YB_{24}	—	January 21, 2006	Mount Lemmon	Mount Lemmon Survey	KOR	1.2 km	MPC · JPL
518077	2015 YD_{24}	—	October 8, 2008	Mount Lemmon	Mount Lemmon Survey	VER	2.4 km	MPC · JPL
518078	2016 AM_{48}	—	April 16, 2012	Haleakala	Pan-STARRS 1	KOR	1.3 km	MPC · JPL
518079	2016 AR_{227}	—	September 24, 2008	Mount Lemmon	Mount Lemmon Survey	·	3.2 km	MPC · JPL
518080	2016 AY_{227}	—	January 8, 2011	Mount Lemmon	Mount Lemmon Survey	·	2.2 km	MPC · JPL
518081	2016 AA_{228}	—	October 7, 2008	Mount Lemmon	Mount Lemmon Survey	·	2.1 km	MPC · JPL
518082	2016 AB_{228}	—	January 8, 2010	Kitt Peak	Spacewatch	CYB	2.9 km	MPC · JPL
518083	2016 AJ_{228}	—	December 23, 1998	Kitt Peak	Spacewatch	·	1.6 km	MPC · JPL
518084	2016 AN_{228}	—	February 4, 2005	Mount Lemmon	Mount Lemmon Survey	·	2.6 km	MPC · JPL
518085	2016 AO_{228}	—	September 28, 2008	Mount Lemmon	Mount Lemmon Survey	·	2.6 km	MPC · JPL
518086	2016 AP_{228}	—	August 12, 2013	Haleakala	Pan-STARRS 1	EOS	2.1 km	MPC · JPL
518087	2016 AQ_{228}	—	September 28, 2008	Mount Lemmon	Mount Lemmon Survey	·	2.5 km	MPC · JPL
518088	2016 AR_{228}	—	July 1, 2013	Haleakala	Pan-STARRS 1	·	2.9 km	MPC · JPL
518089	2016 AU_{228}	—	December 26, 2009	Kitt Peak	Spacewatch	·	2.8 km	MPC · JPL
518090	2016 AV_{228}	—	November 1, 2014	Kitt Peak	Spacewatch	KOR	1.0 km	MPC · JPL
518091	2016 AW_{228}	—	September 21, 2008	Mount Lemmon	Mount Lemmon Survey	·	2.3 km	MPC · JPL
518092	2016 AX_{228}	—	March 25, 2011	Catalina	CSS	·	3.2 km	MPC · JPL
518093	2016 AY_{228}	—	July 14, 2013	Haleakala	Pan-STARRS 1	·	3.4 km	MPC · JPL
518094	2016 AB_{229}	—	November 19, 2003	Anderson Mesa	LONEOS	·	2.9 km	MPC · JPL
518095	2016 AG_{229}	—	November 7, 2008	Mount Lemmon	Mount Lemmon Survey	VER	2.6 km	MPC · JPL
518096	2016 AH_{229}	—	September 14, 2013	Kitt Peak	Spacewatch	·	2.8 km	MPC · JPL
518097	2016 AJ_{229}	—	March 11, 2005	Mount Lemmon	Mount Lemmon Survey	·	3.2 km	MPC · JPL
518098	2016 AM_{229}	—	April 28, 2011	Kitt Peak	Spacewatch	·	3.6 km	MPC · JPL
518099	2016 AQ_{229}	—	September 6, 2008	Kitt Peak	Spacewatch	·	2.6 km	MPC · JPL
518100	2016 AT_{229}	—	January 4, 2011	Mount Lemmon	Mount Lemmon Survey	·	2.4 km	MPC · JPL

== 518101–518200 ==
back to top

Designation			Discovery			Properties		Ref
Permanent	Provisional	Named after	Date	Site	Discoverer(s)	Category	Diam.	Ref
518101	2016 AY_{229}	—	October 10, 2008	Mount Lemmon	Mount Lemmon Survey	·	3.0 km	MPC · JPL
518102	2016 AK_{230}	—	August 15, 2013	Haleakala	Pan-STARRS 1	·	1.8 km	MPC · JPL
518103	2016 AM_{230}	—	September 7, 2008	Mount Lemmon	Mount Lemmon Survey	·	1.8 km	MPC · JPL
518104	2016 AO_{230}	—	August 14, 2013	Haleakala	Pan-STARRS 1	VER	2.3 km	MPC · JPL
518105	2016 AQ_{230}	—	October 29, 2014	Haleakala	Pan-STARRS 1	VER	2.0 km	MPC · JPL
518106	2016 AS_{230}	—	December 19, 2009	Mount Lemmon	Mount Lemmon Survey	EOS	2.2 km	MPC · JPL
518107	2016 BY_{91}	—	October 6, 2013	Mount Lemmon	Mount Lemmon Survey	·	2.8 km	MPC · JPL
518108	2016 BZ_{91}	—	December 24, 1998	Kitt Peak	Spacewatch	·	2.6 km	MPC · JPL
518109	2016 BG_{92}	—	November 9, 2008	Mount Lemmon	Mount Lemmon Survey	·	2.8 km	MPC · JPL
518110	2016 BJ_{92}	—	September 24, 2009	La Sagra	OAM	EUN	1.3 km	MPC · JPL
518111	2016 CY_{165}	—	January 19, 2005	Kitt Peak	Spacewatch	·	3.3 km	MPC · JPL
518112	2016 CK_{286}	—	October 10, 2008	Mount Lemmon	Mount Lemmon Survey	·	2.7 km	MPC · JPL
518113	2016 CL_{286}	—	September 29, 2008	Mount Lemmon	Mount Lemmon Survey	·	2.5 km	MPC · JPL
518114	2016 CR_{286}	—	September 29, 2008	Mount Lemmon	Mount Lemmon Survey	·	2.6 km	MPC · JPL
518115	2016 CU_{286}	—	October 7, 2008	Mount Lemmon	Mount Lemmon Survey	EOS	1.6 km	MPC · JPL
518116	2016 CA_{287}	—	September 29, 2011	Mount Lemmon	Mount Lemmon Survey	·	750 m	MPC · JPL
518117	2016 CG_{287}	—	February 9, 2011	Mount Lemmon	Mount Lemmon Survey	·	1.7 km	MPC · JPL
518118	2016 CJ_{287}	—	March 27, 2012	Catalina	CSS	·	1.1 km	MPC · JPL
518119	2016 CN_{287}	—	June 21, 2012	Kitt Peak	Spacewatch	·	2.2 km	MPC · JPL
518120	2016 CO_{287}	—	February 1, 2006	Mount Lemmon	Mount Lemmon Survey	·	2.4 km	MPC · JPL
518121	2016 CP_{287}	—	May 29, 2012	Mount Lemmon	Mount Lemmon Survey	EOS	1.7 km	MPC · JPL
518122	2016 CQ_{287}	—	November 24, 2014	Haleakala	Pan-STARRS 1	·	1.9 km	MPC · JPL
518123	2016 CR_{287}	—	September 29, 2008	Mount Lemmon	Mount Lemmon Survey	·	2.5 km	MPC · JPL
518124	2016 CW_{287}	—	November 20, 2008	Mount Lemmon	Mount Lemmon Survey	·	2.1 km	MPC · JPL
518125	2016 CZ_{287}	—	November 21, 2014	Haleakala	Pan-STARRS 1	EOS	1.6 km	MPC · JPL
518126	2016 CD_{288}	—	August 12, 2013	Haleakala	Pan-STARRS 1	·	1.9 km	MPC · JPL
518127	2016 CM_{288}	—	October 26, 2008	Mount Lemmon	Mount Lemmon Survey	·	2.1 km	MPC · JPL
518128	2016 CN_{288}	—	September 14, 2013	Haleakala	Pan-STARRS 1	·	2.3 km	MPC · JPL
518129	2016 CO_{288}	—	December 28, 2005	Kitt Peak	Spacewatch	·	2.0 km	MPC · JPL
518130	2016 CP_{288}	—	November 29, 2003	Kitt Peak	Spacewatch	·	2.2 km	MPC · JPL
518131	2016 CT_{288}	—	October 9, 2008	Mount Lemmon	Mount Lemmon Survey	·	2.3 km	MPC · JPL
518132	2016 CV_{288}	—	November 24, 2008	Mount Lemmon	Mount Lemmon Survey	VER	2.9 km	MPC · JPL
518133	2016 CX_{288}	—	September 28, 2008	Mount Lemmon	Mount Lemmon Survey	·	2.6 km	MPC · JPL
518134	2016 CC_{289}	—	July 28, 2008	Mount Lemmon	Mount Lemmon Survey	·	1.6 km	MPC · JPL
518135	2016 DZ_{32}	—	November 3, 2008	Mount Lemmon	Mount Lemmon Survey	·	2.5 km	MPC · JPL
518136	2016 EK_{115}	—	January 6, 2012	Haleakala	Pan-STARRS 1	·	1.8 km	MPC · JPL
518137	2016 EU_{223}	—	October 31, 2008	Catalina	CSS	EOS	1.9 km	MPC · JPL
518138	2016 EV_{223}	—	January 28, 2011	Mount Lemmon	Mount Lemmon Survey	MRX	1.0 km	MPC · JPL
518139	2016 EA_{224}	—	August 15, 2013	Haleakala	Pan-STARRS 1	(5)	960 m	MPC · JPL
518140	2016 ED_{224}	—	August 4, 2013	Haleakala	Pan-STARRS 1	·	980 m	MPC · JPL
518141	2016 EF_{224}	—	June 7, 2011	Haleakala	Pan-STARRS 1	·	1.9 km	MPC · JPL
518142	2016 EJ_{224}	—	September 27, 2008	Mount Lemmon	Mount Lemmon Survey	GEF	1.1 km	MPC · JPL
518143	2016 EK_{224}	—	May 13, 2007	Mount Lemmon	Mount Lemmon Survey	GEF	930 m	MPC · JPL
518144	2016 EN_{224}	—	October 30, 2014	Mount Lemmon	Mount Lemmon Survey	·	1.6 km	MPC · JPL
518145	2016 EU_{224}	—	December 29, 2014	Haleakala	Pan-STARRS 1	·	1.7 km	MPC · JPL
518146	2016 EV_{224}	—	February 19, 2010	Mount Lemmon	Mount Lemmon Survey	·	4.1 km	MPC · JPL
518147	2016 EW_{224}	—	July 29, 2008	Kitt Peak	Spacewatch	MRX	760 m	MPC · JPL
518148	2016 EZ_{224}	—	March 2, 2011	Kitt Peak	Spacewatch	·	1.5 km	MPC · JPL
518149	2016 ED_{225}	—	November 20, 2008	Mount Lemmon	Mount Lemmon Survey	EOS	1.7 km	MPC · JPL
518150	2016 EM_{225}	—	April 1, 2011	Kitt Peak	Spacewatch	EOS	1.5 km	MPC · JPL
518151	2016 FH_{13}	—	March 29, 2016	Haleakala	Pan-STARRS 1	T_{j} (0) · centaur	50 km	MPC · JPL
518152	2016 FT_{34}	—	September 20, 2003	Kitt Peak	Spacewatch	·	1.8 km	MPC · JPL
518153	2016 FZ_{63}	—	September 14, 2013	Haleakala	Pan-STARRS 1	·	1.4 km	MPC · JPL
518154	2016 FA_{64}	—	October 27, 2008	Mount Lemmon	Mount Lemmon Survey	·	2.5 km	MPC · JPL
518155	2016 GV_{26}	—	January 30, 2006	Kitt Peak	Spacewatch	KOR	1.4 km	MPC · JPL
518156	2016 GW_{40}	—	February 19, 2009	Kitt Peak	Spacewatch	·	620 m	MPC · JPL
518157	2016 GO_{104}	—	March 18, 2007	Catalina	CSS	·	1.5 km	MPC · JPL
518158	2016 GE_{259}	—	January 17, 2015	Haleakala	Pan-STARRS 1	·	2.9 km	MPC · JPL
518159	2016 GG_{259}	—	November 19, 2008	Mount Lemmon	Mount Lemmon Survey	EOS	1.8 km	MPC · JPL
518160	2016 GH_{259}	—	October 27, 2008	Mount Lemmon	Mount Lemmon Survey	·	2.0 km	MPC · JPL
518161	2016 GK_{259}	—	September 27, 2008	Mount Lemmon	Mount Lemmon Survey	·	2.2 km	MPC · JPL
518162	2016 GL_{259}	—	September 27, 2008	Mount Lemmon	Mount Lemmon Survey	AGN	1.2 km	MPC · JPL
518163	2016 GN_{259}	—	October 9, 2008	Mount Lemmon	Mount Lemmon Survey	·	1.7 km	MPC · JPL
518164	2016 GO_{259}	—	October 9, 2008	Mount Lemmon	Mount Lemmon Survey	AGN	890 m	MPC · JPL
518165	2016 GR_{259}	—	December 8, 2010	Mount Lemmon	Mount Lemmon Survey	·	1.9 km	MPC · JPL
518166	2016 GS_{259}	—	December 4, 2013	Haleakala	Pan-STARRS 1	EOS	1.9 km	MPC · JPL
518167	2016 HZ_{24}	—	October 7, 2008	Mount Lemmon	Mount Lemmon Survey	·	2.2 km	MPC · JPL
518168	2016 JT_{40}	—	December 19, 2003	Kitt Peak	Spacewatch	·	2.6 km	MPC · JPL
518169	2016 KE_{5}	—	September 29, 2008	Kitt Peak	Spacewatch	GAL	1.1 km	MPC · JPL
518170	2016 KF_{5}	—	November 9, 2008	Mount Lemmon	Mount Lemmon Survey	·	2.4 km	MPC · JPL
518171	2016 LK_{52}	—	January 14, 2015	Haleakala	Pan-STARRS 1	H	440 m	MPC · JPL
518172	2016 LB_{53}	—	September 23, 2011	Haleakala	Pan-STARRS 1	H	400 m	MPC · JPL
518173	2016 LV_{57}	—	January 16, 2007	Anderson Mesa	LONEOS	BRG	1.8 km	MPC · JPL
518174	2016 LX_{57}	—	September 4, 2008	Kitt Peak	Spacewatch	·	1.7 km	MPC · JPL
518175	2016 LC_{58}	—	September 23, 2008	Mount Lemmon	Mount Lemmon Survey	·	1.7 km	MPC · JPL
518176	2016 LG_{58}	—	October 10, 2008	Mount Lemmon	Mount Lemmon Survey	·	1.5 km	MPC · JPL
518177	2016 NZ_{3}	—	October 17, 2012	Mount Lemmon	Mount Lemmon Survey	·	2.2 km	MPC · JPL
518178	2016 NW_{57}	—	February 17, 2010	Catalina	CSS	H	470 m	MPC · JPL
518179	2016 NW_{70}	—	April 27, 2011	Kitt Peak	Spacewatch	·	1.4 km	MPC · JPL
518180	2016 NA_{71}	—	February 18, 2015	Haleakala	Pan-STARRS 1	·	1.2 km	MPC · JPL
518181	2016 NG_{71}	—	November 24, 2008	Mount Lemmon	Mount Lemmon Survey	·	1.6 km	MPC · JPL
518182	2016 NK_{71}	—	October 10, 2012	Haleakala	Pan-STARRS 1	·	2.4 km	MPC · JPL
518183	2016 NR_{71}	—	September 9, 2008	Mount Lemmon	Mount Lemmon Survey	·	1.1 km	MPC · JPL
518184	2016 NW_{71}	—	May 10, 2007	Mount Lemmon	Mount Lemmon Survey	·	1.1 km	MPC · JPL
518185	2016 NX_{71}	—	October 30, 2008	Mount Lemmon	Mount Lemmon Survey	·	1.1 km	MPC · JPL
518186	2016 NF_{72}	—	May 18, 2015	Haleakala	Pan-STARRS 1	·	1.7 km	MPC · JPL
518187	2016 NH_{72}	—	March 31, 2011	Haleakala	Pan-STARRS 1	·	1.4 km	MPC · JPL
518188	2016 NK_{72}	—	November 1, 2008	Mount Lemmon	Mount Lemmon Survey	·	1.2 km	MPC · JPL
518189	2016 OT_{6}	—	October 21, 2007	Kitt Peak	Spacewatch	·	1.8 km	MPC · JPL
518190	2016 OW_{6}	—	January 13, 2010	Mount Lemmon	Mount Lemmon Survey	EUN	1.3 km	MPC · JPL
518191	2016 OZ_{6}	—	October 17, 2006	Catalina	CSS	EOS	2.2 km	MPC · JPL
518192	2016 PA_{77}	—	December 7, 2008	Mount Lemmon	Mount Lemmon Survey	·	1.7 km	MPC · JPL
518193	2016 PX_{79}	—	January 19, 2015	Mount Lemmon	Mount Lemmon Survey	H	480 m	MPC · JPL
518194	2016 PS_{96}	—	December 31, 2013	Kitt Peak	Spacewatch	·	1.3 km	MPC · JPL
518195	2016 PU_{96}	—	October 2, 2008	Mount Lemmon	Mount Lemmon Survey	·	920 m	MPC · JPL
518196	2016 PW_{96}	—	October 3, 2008	Mount Lemmon	Mount Lemmon Survey	·	1.8 km	MPC · JPL
518197	2016 PX_{96}	—	February 16, 2004	Kitt Peak	Spacewatch	·	1.7 km	MPC · JPL
518198	2016 PH_{97}	—	September 9, 2008	Mount Lemmon	Mount Lemmon Survey	·	1.2 km	MPC · JPL
518199	2016 PJ_{97}	—	February 9, 2014	Mount Lemmon	Mount Lemmon Survey	·	1.5 km	MPC · JPL
518200	2016 PK_{97}	—	June 10, 2011	Mount Lemmon	Mount Lemmon Survey	·	1.3 km	MPC · JPL

== 518201–518300 ==
back to top

Designation			Discovery			Properties		Ref
Permanent	Provisional	Named after	Date	Site	Discoverer(s)	Category	Diam.	Ref
518201	2016 PM_{97}	—	September 30, 2008	Catalina	CSS	·	1.7 km	MPC · JPL
518202	2016 PP_{97}	—	May 26, 2011	Mount Lemmon	Mount Lemmon Survey	·	1.3 km	MPC · JPL
518203	2016 PQ_{97}	—	October 7, 2012	Haleakala	Pan-STARRS 1	·	1.3 km	MPC · JPL
518204	2016 PD_{98}	—	October 19, 2012	Haleakala	Pan-STARRS 1	·	1.3 km	MPC · JPL
518205	2016 PE_{98}	—	October 8, 2012	Kitt Peak	Spacewatch	·	860 m	MPC · JPL
518206	2016 PQ_{98}	—	September 22, 2008	Mount Lemmon	Mount Lemmon Survey	ADE	1.8 km	MPC · JPL
518207	2016 PB_{99}	—	May 21, 2015	Haleakala	Pan-STARRS 1	V	550 m	MPC · JPL
518208	2016 QV_{6}	—	September 30, 2007	Kitt Peak	Spacewatch	·	1.9 km	MPC · JPL
518209	2016 QC_{26}	—	November 16, 2006	Kitt Peak	Spacewatch	VER	3.3 km	MPC · JPL
518210	2016 QO_{33}	—	September 3, 2005	Catalina	CSS	H	610 m	MPC · JPL
518211	2016 QJ_{88}	—	October 26, 2012	Haleakala	Pan-STARRS 1	·	1.2 km	MPC · JPL
518212	2016 QL_{89}	—	September 25, 2008	Mount Lemmon	Mount Lemmon Survey	EUN	1.1 km	MPC · JPL
518213	2016 QM_{89}	—	October 24, 2008	Mount Lemmon	Mount Lemmon Survey	·	2.4 km	MPC · JPL
518214	2016 QP_{89}	—	November 1, 2008	Mount Lemmon	Mount Lemmon Survey	(5)	950 m	MPC · JPL
518215	2016 QQ_{89}	—	February 10, 2014	Catalina	CSS	JUN	1.1 km	MPC · JPL
518216	2016 QR_{89}	—	November 6, 2008	Mount Lemmon	Mount Lemmon Survey	·	1.1 km	MPC · JPL
518217	2016 QS_{89}	—	November 9, 2008	Mount Lemmon	Mount Lemmon Survey	MAR	790 m	MPC · JPL
518218	2016 RB_{19}	—	April 6, 2005	Kitt Peak	Spacewatch	H	420 m	MPC · JPL
518219	2016 RE_{19}	—	November 23, 2014	Haleakala	Pan-STARRS 1	H	380 m	MPC · JPL
518220	2016 RP_{38}	—	January 15, 2015	Haleakala	Pan-STARRS 1	H	500 m	MPC · JPL
518221	2016 RN_{42}	—	August 28, 2016	Mount Lemmon	Mount Lemmon Survey	H	440 m	MPC · JPL
518222	2016 RP_{42}	—	March 19, 2015	Haleakala	Pan-STARRS 1	H	410 m	MPC · JPL
518223	2016 SO_{1}	—	May 2, 2013	Haleakala	Pan-STARRS 1	H	520 m	MPC · JPL
518224	2016 SN_{9}	—	March 8, 2005	Mount Lemmon	Mount Lemmon Survey	H	420 m	MPC · JPL
518225	2016 SL_{35}	—	November 25, 2011	Haleakala	Pan-STARRS 1	H	600 m	MPC · JPL
518226	2016 SK_{50}	—	October 6, 2008	Mount Lemmon	Mount Lemmon Survey	·	990 m	MPC · JPL
518227	2016 TZ_{2}	—	April 7, 2005	Kitt Peak	Spacewatch	H	580 m	MPC · JPL
518228	2016 TR_{16}	—	April 15, 2008	Kitt Peak	Spacewatch	·	730 m	MPC · JPL
518229	2016 TX_{34}	—	February 20, 2015	Haleakala	Pan-STARRS 1	H	420 m	MPC · JPL
518230	2016 TA_{50}	—	November 28, 2013	Mount Lemmon	Mount Lemmon Survey	·	760 m	MPC · JPL
518231	2016 TC_{58}	—	January 1, 2009	Kitt Peak	Spacewatch	·	1.4 km	MPC · JPL
518232	2016 US	—	September 23, 2005	Kitt Peak	Spacewatch	·	1.1 km	MPC · JPL
518233	2016 UO_{6}	—	September 14, 2009	Catalina	CSS	·	920 m	MPC · JPL
518234	2016 UX_{10}	—	September 19, 2006	Kitt Peak	Spacewatch	·	490 m	MPC · JPL
518235	2016 UU_{14}	—	October 24, 2005	Kitt Peak	Spacewatch	·	950 m	MPC · JPL
518236	2016 UA_{22}	—	September 29, 2005	Mount Lemmon	Mount Lemmon Survey	·	850 m	MPC · JPL
518237	2016 UM_{27}	—	April 21, 2012	Mount Lemmon	Mount Lemmon Survey	·	710 m	MPC · JPL
518238	2016 US_{29}	—	October 17, 2012	Mount Lemmon	Mount Lemmon Survey	EUN	1.0 km	MPC · JPL
518239	2016 UU_{35}	—	August 29, 2005	Kitt Peak	Spacewatch	·	1.1 km	MPC · JPL
518240	2016 UU_{36}	—	July 8, 2008	Mount Lemmon	Mount Lemmon Survey	H	560 m	MPC · JPL
518241	2016 UY_{37}	—	December 31, 2007	Kitt Peak	Spacewatch	·	2.1 km	MPC · JPL
518242	2016 UO_{61}	—	January 10, 2007	Mount Lemmon	Mount Lemmon Survey	·	980 m	MPC · JPL
518243	2016 UW_{62}	—	January 27, 2007	Kitt Peak	Spacewatch	VER	2.6 km	MPC · JPL
518244	2016 UC_{64}	—	September 2, 2010	Mount Lemmon	Mount Lemmon Survey	·	3.6 km	MPC · JPL
518245	2016 UA_{68}	—	October 20, 2012	Mount Lemmon	Mount Lemmon Survey	·	1.6 km	MPC · JPL
518246	2016 UV_{72}	—	September 21, 2009	Mount Lemmon	Mount Lemmon Survey	·	790 m	MPC · JPL
518247	2016 UV_{85}	—	October 8, 2012	Mount Lemmon	Mount Lemmon Survey	·	900 m	MPC · JPL
518248	2016 UQ_{97}	—	April 11, 2007	Kitt Peak	Spacewatch	·	1.2 km	MPC · JPL
518249	2016 UK_{102}	—	November 15, 2006	Kitt Peak	Spacewatch	·	610 m	MPC · JPL
518250	2016 UZ_{126}	—	September 26, 2012	Mount Lemmon	Mount Lemmon Survey	·	1.3 km	MPC · JPL
518251	2016 UK_{136}	—	August 24, 2012	Kitt Peak	Spacewatch	·	1.2 km	MPC · JPL
518252	2016 UX_{138}	—	November 6, 2008	Mount Lemmon	Mount Lemmon Survey	·	1.1 km	MPC · JPL
518253	2016 UU_{140}	—	September 6, 2010	Kitt Peak	Spacewatch	·	1.2 km	MPC · JPL
518254	2016 UE_{148}	—	December 16, 2009	Mount Lemmon	Mount Lemmon Survey	·	1.4 km	MPC · JPL
518255	2016 UK_{148}	—	October 15, 2007	Mount Lemmon	Mount Lemmon Survey	·	1.4 km	MPC · JPL
518256	2016 VV	—	November 9, 2008	Mount Lemmon	Mount Lemmon Survey	H	490 m	MPC · JPL
518257	2016 VN_{19}	—	October 3, 2015	Mount Lemmon	Mount Lemmon Survey	·	3.2 km	MPC · JPL
518258	2016 VR_{19}	—	November 25, 2011	Haleakala	Pan-STARRS 1	·	1.5 km	MPC · JPL
518259	2016 VS_{19}	—	January 28, 2009	Catalina	CSS	·	1.4 km	MPC · JPL
518260	2016 WV_{3}	—	September 29, 2009	Mount Lemmon	Mount Lemmon Survey	·	620 m	MPC · JPL
518261	2016 WE_{5}	—	October 9, 2016	Kitt Peak	Spacewatch	(5)	1.2 km	MPC · JPL
518262	2016 WT_{15}	—	November 14, 2007	Mount Lemmon	Mount Lemmon Survey	·	1.7 km	MPC · JPL
518263	2016 WG_{25}	—	November 25, 2005	Kitt Peak	Spacewatch	·	1.3 km	MPC · JPL
518264	2016 WP_{31}	—	November 1, 2007	Kitt Peak	Spacewatch	EUN	1.1 km	MPC · JPL
518265	2016 WO_{37}	—	March 30, 2011	Haleakala	Pan-STARRS 1	·	870 m	MPC · JPL
518266	2016 WK_{45}	—	December 22, 2012	Haleakala	Pan-STARRS 1	·	1.4 km	MPC · JPL
518267	2016 WJ_{52}	—	August 3, 2015	Haleakala	Pan-STARRS 1	·	2.1 km	MPC · JPL
518268	2016 WP_{54}	—	December 12, 2012	Haleakala	Pan-STARRS 1	·	1.1 km	MPC · JPL
518269	2016 WW_{56}	—	January 2, 2009	Mount Lemmon	Mount Lemmon Survey	·	1.2 km	MPC · JPL
518270	2016 WY_{56}	—	January 20, 2009	Mount Lemmon	Mount Lemmon Survey	·	1.5 km	MPC · JPL
518271	2016 WZ_{56}	—	March 18, 2009	Catalina	CSS	·	1.8 km	MPC · JPL
518272	2016 WA_{57}	—	March 1, 2008	Kitt Peak	Spacewatch	·	1.9 km	MPC · JPL
518273	2016 XZ_{5}	—	September 4, 2011	Haleakala	Pan-STARRS 1	·	1.9 km	MPC · JPL
518274	2016 XA_{7}	—	October 7, 1999	Socorro	LINEAR	·	1.7 km	MPC · JPL
518275	2016 XA_{12}	—	October 22, 2005	Kitt Peak	Spacewatch	·	2.4 km	MPC · JPL
518276	2016 XJ_{20}	—	January 27, 2007	Kitt Peak	Spacewatch	·	3.6 km	MPC · JPL
518277	2016 YR_{1}	—	January 31, 2003	Anderson Mesa	LONEOS	·	1.4 km	MPC · JPL
518278	2016 YM_{5}	—	February 4, 2005	Catalina	CSS	·	1.4 km	MPC · JPL
518279	2016 YN_{5}	—	December 8, 2012	Mount Lemmon	Mount Lemmon Survey	·	1.5 km	MPC · JPL
518280	2016 YZ_{7}	—	December 14, 2004	Kitt Peak	Spacewatch	·	1.7 km	MPC · JPL
518281	2016 YS_{9}	—	January 20, 2009	Catalina	CSS	·	1.3 km	MPC · JPL
518282	2016 YM_{12}	—	September 23, 2015	Haleakala	Pan-STARRS 1	(5651)	2.4 km	MPC · JPL
518283	2016 YD_{13}	—	May 16, 2007	Mount Lemmon	Mount Lemmon Survey	·	3.3 km	MPC · JPL
518284	2017 AD	—	January 22, 2012	Haleakala	Pan-STARRS 1	·	2.6 km	MPC · JPL
518285	2017 AG_{6}	—	March 13, 2012	Mount Lemmon	Mount Lemmon Survey	·	2.7 km	MPC · JPL
518286	2017 AV_{6}	—	August 21, 2006	Kitt Peak	Spacewatch	·	1.9 km	MPC · JPL
518287	2017 AF_{8}	—	December 2, 2010	Mount Lemmon	Mount Lemmon Survey	·	1.9 km	MPC · JPL
518288	2017 AW_{9}	—	January 21, 2012	Catalina	CSS	·	2.0 km	MPC · JPL
518289	2017 AQ_{12}	—	January 26, 2012	Kitt Peak	Spacewatch	·	2.3 km	MPC · JPL
518290	2017 AX_{12}	—	October 8, 2008	Mount Lemmon	Mount Lemmon Survey	·	1.8 km	MPC · JPL
518291	2017 AF_{14}	—	March 13, 2007	Mount Lemmon	Mount Lemmon Survey	·	2.9 km	MPC · JPL
518292	2017 BG	—	November 25, 2006	Catalina	CSS	·	2.2 km	MPC · JPL
518293	2017 BU_{2}	—	October 20, 2006	Catalina	CSS	·	2.6 km	MPC · JPL
518294	2017 BF_{4}	—	February 26, 2008	Kitt Peak	Spacewatch	·	1.8 km	MPC · JPL
518295	2017 BW_{4}	—	February 22, 2006	Anderson Mesa	LONEOS	VER	3.8 km	MPC · JPL
518296	2017 BY_{9}	—	November 11, 2004	Kitt Peak	Spacewatch	·	1.4 km	MPC · JPL
518297	2017 BV_{10}	—	October 15, 2004	Mount Lemmon	Mount Lemmon Survey	THM	2.0 km	MPC · JPL
518298	2017 BH_{17}	—	September 19, 1998	Apache Point	SDSS	·	2.6 km	MPC · JPL
518299	2017 BR_{18}	—	August 15, 2009	Kitt Peak	Spacewatch	EOS	2.1 km	MPC · JPL
518300	2017 BA_{19}	—	January 2, 2011	Mount Lemmon	Mount Lemmon Survey	·	3.1 km	MPC · JPL

== 518301–518400 ==
back to top

Designation			Discovery			Properties		Ref
Permanent	Provisional	Named after	Date	Site	Discoverer(s)	Category	Diam.	Ref
518301	2017 BX_{21}	—	March 12, 2007	Mount Lemmon	Mount Lemmon Survey	·	1.9 km	MPC · JPL
518302	2017 BF_{23}	—	January 13, 2008	Mount Lemmon	Mount Lemmon Survey	·	2.0 km	MPC · JPL
518303	2017 BX_{25}	—	December 10, 2010	Mount Lemmon	Mount Lemmon Survey	·	3.3 km	MPC · JPL
518304	2017 BG_{27}	—	April 15, 2007	Mount Lemmon	Mount Lemmon Survey	·	2.8 km	MPC · JPL
518305	2017 BD_{33}	—	February 22, 2007	Kitt Peak	Spacewatch	·	1.5 km	MPC · JPL
518306	2017 BP_{34}	—	January 8, 2006	Mount Lemmon	Mount Lemmon Survey	T_{j} (2.96)	4.0 km	MPC · JPL
518307	2017 BB_{36}	—	December 28, 2005	Kitt Peak	Spacewatch	·	2.9 km	MPC · JPL
518308	2017 BU_{37}	—	November 22, 2005	Kitt Peak	Spacewatch	·	2.5 km	MPC · JPL
518309	2017 BG_{40}	—	February 7, 2008	Kitt Peak	Spacewatch	HOF	2.6 km	MPC · JPL
518310	2017 BK_{52}	—	February 20, 2006	Kitt Peak	Spacewatch	·	2.7 km	MPC · JPL
518311	2017 BG_{54}	—	April 29, 2009	Kitt Peak	Spacewatch	·	2.0 km	MPC · JPL
518312	2017 BP_{61}	—	December 3, 2005	Kitt Peak	Spacewatch	·	2.7 km	MPC · JPL
518313	2017 BA_{63}	—	September 21, 2009	Mount Lemmon	Mount Lemmon Survey	·	2.6 km	MPC · JPL
518314	2017 BM_{65}	—	November 10, 2004	Kitt Peak	Spacewatch	·	3.3 km	MPC · JPL
518315	2017 BB_{67}	—	October 12, 2005	Kitt Peak	Spacewatch	·	3.1 km	MPC · JPL
518316	2017 BV_{70}	—	November 25, 2006	Kitt Peak	Spacewatch	KOR	1.1 km	MPC · JPL
518317	2017 BK_{74}	—	February 22, 2006	Kitt Peak	Spacewatch	·	2.4 km	MPC · JPL
518318	2017 BB_{77}	—	October 22, 2005	Kitt Peak	Spacewatch	·	1.5 km	MPC · JPL
518319	2017 BZ_{80}	—	August 27, 2014	Haleakala	Pan-STARRS 1	VER	2.4 km	MPC · JPL
518320	2017 BZ_{82}	—	October 9, 2004	Kitt Peak	Spacewatch	·	2.7 km	MPC · JPL
518321	2017 BC_{84}	—	November 3, 2010	Mount Lemmon	Mount Lemmon Survey	EOS	2.0 km	MPC · JPL
518322	2017 BQ_{87}	—	August 3, 2015	Haleakala	Pan-STARRS 1	·	1.1 km	MPC · JPL
518323	2017 BO_{96}	—	March 23, 2006	Catalina	CSS	·	3.4 km	MPC · JPL
518324	2017 BV_{96}	—	October 3, 2006	Mount Lemmon	Mount Lemmon Survey	AGN	1.1 km	MPC · JPL
518325	2017 BN_{100}	—	August 20, 2014	Haleakala	Pan-STARRS 1	·	2.0 km	MPC · JPL
518326	2017 BR_{104}	—	September 5, 2010	Mount Lemmon	Mount Lemmon Survey	·	2.3 km	MPC · JPL
518327	2017 BC_{105}	—	September 2, 2014	Haleakala	Pan-STARRS 1	URS	3.3 km	MPC · JPL
518328	2017 BU_{105}	—	May 30, 2009	Mount Lemmon	Mount Lemmon Survey	·	1.9 km	MPC · JPL
518329	2017 BT_{108}	—	October 8, 2015	Haleakala	Pan-STARRS 1	·	2.6 km	MPC · JPL
518330	2017 BN_{112}	—	September 23, 2009	Mount Lemmon	Mount Lemmon Survey	·	3.1 km	MPC · JPL
518331	2017 BC_{120}	—	October 20, 2007	Mount Lemmon	Mount Lemmon Survey	·	1.3 km	MPC · JPL
518332	2017 BM_{120}	—	September 9, 2015	Haleakala	Pan-STARRS 1	·	2.9 km	MPC · JPL
518333	2017 BT_{121}	—	August 30, 2011	Haleakala	Pan-STARRS 1	L5	10 km	MPC · JPL
518334	2017 BK_{124}	—	October 25, 2009	Mount Lemmon	Mount Lemmon Survey	·	3.1 km	MPC · JPL
518335	2017 BO_{128}	—	February 6, 2013	Catalina	CSS	HNS	1.2 km	MPC · JPL
518336	2017 BE_{131}	—	August 14, 2010	WISE	WISE	·	4.5 km	MPC · JPL
518337	2017 BM_{134}	—	December 10, 2010	Mount Lemmon	Mount Lemmon Survey	·	3.2 km	MPC · JPL
518338	2017 BH_{137}	—	December 25, 2009	Kitt Peak	Spacewatch	CYB	3.3 km	MPC · JPL
518339	2017 BJ_{137}	—	May 21, 2014	Haleakala	Pan-STARRS 1	·	630 m	MPC · JPL
518340	2017 BK_{137}	—	January 10, 2013	Mount Lemmon	Mount Lemmon Survey	·	1.3 km	MPC · JPL
518341	2017 CY_{14}	—	January 25, 2006	Kitt Peak	Spacewatch	THM	2.3 km	MPC · JPL
518342	2017 CH_{18}	—	April 14, 2008	Mount Lemmon	Mount Lemmon Survey	·	1.9 km	MPC · JPL
518343	2017 CG_{24}	—	March 26, 2007	Kitt Peak	Spacewatch	·	2.0 km	MPC · JPL
518344	2017 CK_{29}	—	September 6, 2008	Mount Lemmon	Mount Lemmon Survey	·	2.7 km	MPC · JPL
518345	2017 CN_{31}	—	December 2, 2010	Kitt Peak	Spacewatch	·	2.5 km	MPC · JPL
518346	2017 CG_{32}	—	March 25, 2007	Mount Lemmon	Mount Lemmon Survey	·	3.5 km	MPC · JPL
518347	2017 DF_{3}	—	September 20, 2014	Haleakala	Pan-STARRS 1	·	2.3 km	MPC · JPL
518348	2017 DS_{4}	—	January 13, 2010	WISE	WISE	·	2.9 km	MPC · JPL
518349	2017 DB_{5}	—	March 27, 2012	Mount Lemmon	Mount Lemmon Survey	·	2.7 km	MPC · JPL
518350	2017 DN_{5}	—	September 22, 2009	Kitt Peak	Spacewatch	EOS	1.9 km	MPC · JPL
518351	2017 DL_{32}	—	December 31, 1999	Kitt Peak	Spacewatch	HYG	2.6 km	MPC · JPL
518352	2017 DL_{33}	—	April 24, 2009	Mount Lemmon	Mount Lemmon Survey	·	1.5 km	MPC · JPL
518353	2017 DG_{38}	—	September 17, 2010	Mount Lemmon	Mount Lemmon Survey	EOS	2.0 km	MPC · JPL
518354	2017 DB_{40}	—	March 13, 2010	Mount Lemmon	Mount Lemmon Survey	3:2 · SHU	5.1 km	MPC · JPL
518355	2017 DP_{40}	—	August 27, 2006	Kitt Peak	Spacewatch	·	1.2 km	MPC · JPL
518356	2017 DM_{42}	—	March 18, 2007	Kitt Peak	Spacewatch	·	3.1 km	MPC · JPL
518357	2017 DP_{50}	—	June 12, 2007	Kitt Peak	Spacewatch	·	3.2 km	MPC · JPL
518358	2017 DS_{57}	—	June 27, 2014	Haleakala	Pan-STARRS 1	·	2.3 km	MPC · JPL
518359	2017 DG_{61}	—	October 14, 2009	Mount Lemmon	Mount Lemmon Survey	(43176)	4.0 km	MPC · JPL
518360	2017 DZ_{65}	—	December 7, 2015	Haleakala	Pan-STARRS 1	L5	7.5 km	MPC · JPL
518361	2017 DU_{108}	—	October 4, 2006	Mount Lemmon	Mount Lemmon Survey	·	2.1 km	MPC · JPL
518362	2017 DA_{112}	—	March 13, 2007	Kitt Peak	Spacewatch	·	2.4 km	MPC · JPL
518363	2017 DD_{117}	—	January 31, 2012	Haleakala	Pan-STARRS 1	·	3.6 km	MPC · JPL
518364	2017 DZ_{120}	—	June 20, 2013	Haleakala	Pan-STARRS 1	·	2.4 km	MPC · JPL
518365	2017 EJ_{5}	—	December 10, 2004	Kitt Peak	Spacewatch	·	4.6 km	MPC · JPL
518366	2017 EJ_{8}	—	April 15, 2012	Haleakala	Pan-STARRS 1	·	3.6 km	MPC · JPL
518367	2017 EN_{18}	—	August 27, 2009	Siding Spring	SSS	·	3.9 km	MPC · JPL
518368	2017 ED_{24}	—	October 9, 2008	Mount Lemmon	Mount Lemmon Survey	·	720 m	MPC · JPL
518369	2017 FS_{7}	—	October 2, 2008	Mount Lemmon	Mount Lemmon Survey	CYB	3.2 km	MPC · JPL
518370	2017 FQ_{8}	—	January 28, 2003	Kitt Peak	Spacewatch	·	1.8 km	MPC · JPL
518371	2017 FC_{25}	—	November 27, 2009	Kitt Peak	Spacewatch	·	2.8 km	MPC · JPL
518372	2017 FC_{27}	—	November 10, 2010	Mount Lemmon	Mount Lemmon Survey	·	2.6 km	MPC · JPL
518373	2017 FO_{50}	—	January 29, 2012	Kitt Peak	Spacewatch	·	2.7 km	MPC · JPL
518374	2017 FS_{53}	—	October 1, 2003	Kitt Peak	Spacewatch	·	2.6 km	MPC · JPL
518375	2017 FJ_{56}	—	April 27, 2012	Haleakala	Pan-STARRS 1	LIX	3.1 km	MPC · JPL
518376	2017 FE_{70}	—	January 5, 2006	Mount Lemmon	Mount Lemmon Survey	·	3.9 km	MPC · JPL
518377	2017 FC_{72}	—	May 31, 2003	Kitt Peak	Spacewatch	·	3.0 km	MPC · JPL
518378	2017 FZ_{81}	—	January 27, 2007	Mount Lemmon	Mount Lemmon Survey	·	2.1 km	MPC · JPL
518379	2017 FO_{118}	—	December 30, 2007	Kitt Peak	Spacewatch	·	1.3 km	MPC · JPL
518380	2017 FO_{159}	—	November 3, 2000	Kitt Peak	Spacewatch	·	2.2 km	MPC · JPL
518381	2017 FX_{160}	—	October 7, 2008	Mount Lemmon	Mount Lemmon Survey	·	2.6 km	MPC · JPL
518382	2017 FY_{160}	—	November 15, 2001	Kitt Peak	Spacewatch	·	2.0 km	MPC · JPL
518383	2017 FZ_{160}	—	February 24, 2006	Kitt Peak	Spacewatch	·	2.4 km	MPC · JPL
518384	2017 GL_{9}	—	November 19, 2008	Mount Lemmon	Mount Lemmon Survey	·	3.7 km	MPC · JPL
518385	2017 GM_{9}	—	October 2, 2013	Haleakala	Pan-STARRS 1	HYG	2.6 km	MPC · JPL
518386	2017 GN_{9}	—	May 9, 2006	Mount Lemmon	Mount Lemmon Survey	·	2.8 km	MPC · JPL
518387	2017 HZ_{61}	—	November 7, 2008	Mount Lemmon	Mount Lemmon Survey	·	2.1 km	MPC · JPL
518388	2017 HA_{62}	—	October 2, 2008	Mount Lemmon	Mount Lemmon Survey	EOS	1.4 km	MPC · JPL
518389	2017 QA_{14}	—	October 23, 2004	Kitt Peak	Spacewatch	HOF	2.5 km	MPC · JPL
518390	2017 TD_{9}	—	December 30, 2008	Mount Lemmon	Mount Lemmon Survey	·	3.0 km	MPC · JPL
518391	2017 TF_{10}	—	August 27, 2009	Kitt Peak	Spacewatch	EUN	1.1 km	MPC · JPL
518392	2017 TS_{10}	—	August 21, 2006	Kitt Peak	Spacewatch	·	1.3 km	MPC · JPL
518393	2017 TZ_{11}	—	September 28, 1994	Kitt Peak	Spacewatch	DOR	2.5 km	MPC · JPL
518394	2017 TG_{13}	—	January 11, 2010	Kitt Peak	Spacewatch	·	1.9 km	MPC · JPL
518395	2017 UV_{13}	—	March 8, 2010	WISE	WISE	·	1.5 km	MPC · JPL
518396	2017 UW_{15}	—	September 1, 1998	Kitt Peak	Spacewatch	·	2.0 km	MPC · JPL
518397	2017 UX_{20}	—	February 27, 2006	Kitt Peak	Spacewatch	·	2.0 km	MPC · JPL
518398	2017 UE_{33}	—	April 1, 2011	Mount Lemmon	Mount Lemmon Survey	HNS	1 km	MPC · JPL
518399	2017 VM_{23}	—	April 28, 2010	WISE	WISE	DOR	2.7 km	MPC · JPL
518400	2017 WN_{22}	—	December 12, 1996	Kitt Peak	Spacewatch	·	1.3 km	MPC · JPL

== 518401–518500 ==
back to top

Designation			Discovery			Properties		Ref
Permanent	Provisional	Named after	Date	Site	Discoverer(s)	Category	Diam.	Ref
518401	2017 XK_{26}	—	November 7, 2007	Kitt Peak	Spacewatch	·	1.9 km	MPC · JPL
518402	2018 AS_{4}	—	February 28, 2008	Mount Lemmon	Mount Lemmon Survey	EOS	3.3 km	MPC · JPL
518403	2018 AZ_{6}	—	November 13, 2010	Mount Lemmon	Mount Lemmon Survey	·	3.5 km	MPC · JPL
518404	2018 AK_{16}	—	October 11, 2007	Socorro	LINEAR	·	1.7 km	MPC · JPL
518405	2018 CT_{4}	—	September 3, 2008	Kitt Peak	Spacewatch	EUN	1.1 km	MPC · JPL
518406	2018 CN_{5}	—	April 12, 1999	Kitt Peak	Spacewatch	·	2.4 km	MPC · JPL
518407	2018 CD_{6}	—	April 2, 2006	Kitt Peak	Spacewatch	·	2.4 km	MPC · JPL
518408	2018 CO_{6}	—	July 21, 2010	WISE	WISE	·	4.0 km	MPC · JPL
518409	2018 CW_{11}	—	April 4, 2008	Kitt Peak	Spacewatch	·	2.3 km	MPC · JPL
518410	2018 CZ_{11}	—	May 8, 2005	Kitt Peak	Spacewatch	·	630 m	MPC · JPL
518411	2018 CU_{15}	—	December 29, 2008	Mount Lemmon	Mount Lemmon Survey	·	2.2 km	MPC · JPL
518412	2018 CV_{15}	—	April 13, 2002	Kitt Peak	Spacewatch	·	2.9 km	MPC · JPL
518413	2018 DV	—	April 3, 2008	Catalina	CSS	H	600 m	MPC · JPL
518414	2018 DW	—	March 3, 2005	Catalina	CSS	H	590 m	MPC · JPL
518415	2018 DE_{3}	—	January 27, 2007	Mount Lemmon	Mount Lemmon Survey	TIR	2.6 km	MPC · JPL
518416	2018 DF_{3}	—	September 16, 2004	Kitt Peak	Spacewatch	·	3.7 km	MPC · JPL
518417	2018 DG_{4}	—	February 16, 2004	Kitt Peak	Spacewatch	·	2.4 km	MPC · JPL
518418	2018 EH_{2}	—	February 12, 2008	Mount Lemmon	Mount Lemmon Survey	H	360 m	MPC · JPL
518419	2018 EB_{3}	—	February 26, 2007	Mount Lemmon	Mount Lemmon Survey	·	1.2 km	MPC · JPL
518420	2018 EG_{6}	—	June 24, 2011	Mount Lemmon	Mount Lemmon Survey	·	1.2 km	MPC · JPL
518421	1995 QT_{16}	—	August 29, 1995	Kitt Peak	Spacewatch	·	3.4 km	MPC · JPL
518422	1998 WH_{30}	—	November 24, 1998	Kitt Peak	Spacewatch	·	870 m	MPC · JPL
518423	2000 GV_{176}	—	March 14, 2000	Kitt Peak	Spacewatch	·	1.9 km	MPC · JPL
518424	2000 WK_{107}	—	November 28, 2000	Kitt Peak	Spacewatch	AMO +1km	830 m	MPC · JPL
518425	2002 CQ_{70}	—	February 7, 2002	Socorro	LINEAR	V	740 m	MPC · JPL
518426	2002 ON_{4}	—	July 18, 2002	Socorro	LINEAR	AMO	530 m	MPC · JPL
518427	2002 QK_{65}	—	August 17, 2002	Palomar	NEAT	MAR	760 m	MPC · JPL
518428	2002 QO_{70}	—	August 17, 2002	Palomar	NEAT	·	2.6 km	MPC · JPL
518429	2002 QE_{133}	—	August 16, 2002	Palomar	NEAT	·	2.0 km	MPC · JPL
518430	2002 RD_{187}	—	September 13, 2002	Palomar	NEAT	·	1.3 km	MPC · JPL
518431	2002 TG_{178}	—	October 4, 2002	Socorro	LINEAR	·	1.2 km	MPC · JPL
518432	2003 AP_{16}	—	January 5, 2003	Socorro	LINEAR	PHO	1.9 km	MPC · JPL
518433	2003 HQ_{24}	—	April 25, 2003	Kitt Peak	Spacewatch	·	1.0 km	MPC · JPL
518434	2003 PB_{8}	—	August 2, 2003	Haleakala	NEAT	·	1.4 km	MPC · JPL
518435	2003 SP_{258}	—	September 28, 2003	Socorro	LINEAR	·	1.9 km	MPC · JPL
518436	2003 SG_{435}	—	September 19, 2003	Kitt Peak	Spacewatch	·	1.7 km	MPC · JPL
518437	2003 TP_{46}	—	October 3, 2003	Kitt Peak	Spacewatch	·	1.2 km	MPC · JPL
518438	2003 WL_{5}	—	November 18, 2003	Kitt Peak	Spacewatch	·	3.3 km	MPC · JPL
518439	2003 YY_{182}	—	December 18, 2003	Kitt Peak	Spacewatch	EOS	1.5 km	MPC · JPL
518440	2004 CL_{1}	—	February 11, 2004	Socorro	LINEAR	APO	460 m	MPC · JPL
518441	2004 FC_{6}	—	February 25, 2004	Socorro	LINEAR	·	680 m	MPC · JPL
518442	2004 GO_{54}	—	April 13, 2004	Kitt Peak	Spacewatch	·	1.8 km	MPC · JPL
518443	2004 HU_{13}	—	April 16, 2004	Kitt Peak	Spacewatch	MRX	970 m	MPC · JPL
518444	2004 HU_{79}	—	April 21, 2004	Kitt Peak	Spacewatch	·	2.7 km	MPC · JPL
518445	2004 RW_{84}	—	September 10, 2004	Socorro	LINEAR	·	1.1 km	MPC · JPL
518446	2004 RL_{357}	—	September 11, 2004	Kitt Peak	Spacewatch	·	1.2 km	MPC · JPL
518447	2004 TS_{371}	—	October 5, 2004	Kitt Peak	Spacewatch	·	1.2 km	MPC · JPL
518448	2004 YG_{27}	—	December 2, 2004	Kitt Peak	Spacewatch	·	3.0 km	MPC · JPL
518449	2005 BF_{38}	—	December 19, 2004	Mount Lemmon	Mount Lemmon Survey	·	3.1 km	MPC · JPL
518450	2005 BD_{50}	—	January 19, 2005	Kitt Peak	Spacewatch	·	2.0 km	MPC · JPL
518451	2005 EJ_{246}	—	March 12, 2005	Kitt Peak	Spacewatch	·	1.0 km	MPC · JPL
518452	2005 ES_{267}	—	March 14, 2005	Mount Lemmon	Mount Lemmon Survey	·	960 m	MPC · JPL
518453	2005 EZ_{333}	—	March 12, 2005	Kitt Peak	Spacewatch	·	690 m	MPC · JPL
518454	2005 EA_{334}	—	March 12, 2005	Kitt Peak	Spacewatch	KOR	1.6 km	MPC · JPL
518455	2005 GH_{18}	—	April 2, 2005	Mount Lemmon	Mount Lemmon Survey	H	410 m	MPC · JPL
518456	2005 GN_{159}	—	April 12, 2005	Kitt Peak	Spacewatch	ADE	1.6 km	MPC · JPL
518457	2005 GF_{177}	—	April 6, 2005	Kitt Peak	Spacewatch	H	400 m	MPC · JPL
518458 Roblambert	2005 GL_{204}	Roblambert	April 10, 2005	Kitt Peak	M. W. Buie	(10369)	1.4 km	MPC · JPL
518459	2005 GZ_{229}	—	April 7, 2005	Kitt Peak	Spacewatch	·	590 m	MPC · JPL
518460	2005 HN_{7}	—	April 30, 2005	Kitt Peak	Spacewatch	(194)	1.5 km	MPC · JPL
518461	2005 JR_{4}	—	May 1, 2005	Kitt Peak	Spacewatch	·	1.7 km	MPC · JPL
518462	2005 JP_{73}	—	May 8, 2005	Kitt Peak	Spacewatch	EUN	1.1 km	MPC · JPL
518463	2005 JY_{80}	—	May 11, 2005	Catalina	CSS	AMO +1km	1.4 km	MPC · JPL
518464	2005 JU_{119}	—	May 10, 2005	Kitt Peak	Spacewatch	JUN	790 m	MPC · JPL
518465	2005 JB_{149}	—	May 3, 2005	Kitt Peak	Spacewatch	·	1.5 km	MPC · JPL
518466	2005 JC_{162}	—	May 8, 2005	Kitt Peak	Spacewatch	H	440 m	MPC · JPL
518467	2005 KV_{14}	—	May 16, 2005	Kitt Peak	Spacewatch	·	990 m	MPC · JPL
518468	2005 LE_{6}	—	May 20, 2005	Mount Lemmon	Mount Lemmon Survey	·	810 m	MPC · JPL
518469	2005 LH_{8}	—	June 7, 2005	Siding Spring	SSS	AMO	640 m	MPC · JPL
518470	2005 PZ_{4}	—	August 8, 2005	Great Shefford	Birtwhistle, P.	·	1.6 km	MPC · JPL
518471	2005 QZ_{9}	—	August 25, 2005	Campo Imperatore	CINEOS	·	1.5 km	MPC · JPL
518472	2005 QD_{191}	—	August 30, 2005	Kitt Peak	Spacewatch	·	1.8 km	MPC · JPL
518473	2005 QE_{191}	—	August 31, 2005	Kitt Peak	Spacewatch	VER	2.9 km	MPC · JPL
518474	2005 RQ_{52}	—	September 1, 2005	Kitt Peak	Spacewatch	CYB	3.1 km	MPC · JPL
518475	2005 RR_{52}	—	September 1, 2005	Kitt Peak	Spacewatch	·	1.7 km	MPC · JPL
518476	2005 RS_{52}	—	September 12, 2005	Kitt Peak	Spacewatch	·	3.0 km	MPC · JPL
518477	2005 SE_{185}	—	September 11, 2005	Socorro	LINEAR	·	740 m	MPC · JPL
518478	2005 SF_{215}	—	September 30, 2005	Catalina	CSS	·	990 m	MPC · JPL
518479	2005 SG_{217}	—	September 30, 2005	Mount Lemmon	Mount Lemmon Survey	·	2.1 km	MPC · JPL
518480	2005 SE_{283}	—	September 21, 2005	Apache Point	A. C. Becker	·	740 m	MPC · JPL
518481	2005 SH_{294}	—	September 27, 2005	Kitt Peak	Spacewatch	·	2.1 km	MPC · JPL
518482	2005 TZ_{42}	—	September 9, 2005	Socorro	LINEAR	·	840 m	MPC · JPL
518483	2005 TG_{189}	—	October 1, 2005	Catalina	CSS	PHO	890 m	MPC · JPL
518484	2005 TR_{198}	—	October 1, 2005	Kitt Peak	Spacewatch	V	650 m	MPC · JPL
518485	2005 UF_{13}	—	October 22, 2005	Kitt Peak	Spacewatch	·	750 m	MPC · JPL
518486	2005 UC_{44}	—	October 22, 2005	Kitt Peak	Spacewatch	·	860 m	MPC · JPL
518487	2005 UT_{532}	—	October 25, 2005	Kitt Peak	Spacewatch	MAS	780 m	MPC · JPL
518488	2005 UX_{532}	—	October 29, 2005	Kitt Peak	Spacewatch	·	2.8 km	MPC · JPL
518489	2005 VV_{137}	—	November 5, 2005	Kitt Peak	Spacewatch	·	830 m	MPC · JPL
518490	2005 WC_{208}	—	November 25, 2005	Kitt Peak	Spacewatch	EOS	1.7 km	MPC · JPL
518491	2005 XW_{119}	—	December 5, 2005	Kitt Peak	Spacewatch	·	1.2 km	MPC · JPL
518492	2005 XX_{119}	—	December 8, 2005	Kitt Peak	Spacewatch	·	1.2 km	MPC · JPL
518493	2005 YT_{7}	—	December 22, 2005	Kitt Peak	Spacewatch	·	2.5 km	MPC · JPL
518494	2005 YY_{207}	—	November 29, 2005	Mount Lemmon	Mount Lemmon Survey	EOS	2.1 km	MPC · JPL
518495	2005 YU_{229}	—	December 26, 2005	Kitt Peak	Spacewatch	·	2.2 km	MPC · JPL
518496	2005 YZ_{242}	—	December 30, 2005	Kitt Peak	Spacewatch	·	2.2 km	MPC · JPL
518497	2005 YK_{246}	—	December 30, 2005	Kitt Peak	Spacewatch	·	2.0 km	MPC · JPL
518498	2005 YF_{264}	—	December 25, 2005	Kitt Peak	Spacewatch	·	2.5 km	MPC · JPL
518499	2005 YS_{293}	—	December 28, 2005	Kitt Peak	Spacewatch	·	1.2 km	MPC · JPL
518500	2006 BH_{56}	—	January 20, 2006	Kitt Peak	Spacewatch	·	1.0 km	MPC · JPL

== 518501–518600 ==
back to top

Designation			Discovery			Properties		Ref
Permanent	Provisional	Named after	Date	Site	Discoverer(s)	Category	Diam.	Ref
518501	2006 BF_{177}	—	January 27, 2006	Kitt Peak	Spacewatch	NYS	990 m	MPC · JPL
518502	2006 BA_{230}	—	January 23, 2006	Kitt Peak	Spacewatch	EOS	2.1 km	MPC · JPL
518503	2006 BM_{261}	—	January 31, 2006	Kitt Peak	Spacewatch	·	930 m	MPC · JPL
518504	2006 DH_{71}	—	February 21, 2006	Mount Lemmon	Mount Lemmon Survey	·	1.0 km	MPC · JPL
518505	2006 DW_{141}	—	February 25, 2006	Kitt Peak	Spacewatch	·	960 m	MPC · JPL
518506	2006 DP_{219}	—	February 25, 2006	Kitt Peak	Spacewatch	PAD	1.4 km	MPC · JPL
518507	2006 EE_{1}	—	March 5, 2006	Socorro	LINEAR	APO	790 m	MPC · JPL
518508	2006 EG_{76}	—	March 2, 2006	Kitt Peak	Spacewatch	·	1.3 km	MPC · JPL
518509	2006 FZ_{51}	—	March 27, 2006	Siding Spring	SSS	T_{j} (2.95) · CYB	2.4 km	MPC · JPL
518510	2006 HG_{75}	—	April 25, 2006	Kitt Peak	Spacewatch	·	1.6 km	MPC · JPL
518511	2006 HY_{154}	—	April 24, 2006	Kitt Peak	Spacewatch	·	2.0 km	MPC · JPL
518512	2006 JN_{41}	—	May 7, 2006	Kitt Peak	Spacewatch	·	1.0 km	MPC · JPL
518513	2006 JG_{82}	—	May 7, 2006	Kitt Peak	Spacewatch	·	2.5 km	MPC · JPL
518514	2006 KO_{34}	—	May 6, 2006	Mount Lemmon	Mount Lemmon Survey	·	680 m	MPC · JPL
518515	2006 KO_{94}	—	May 25, 2006	Kitt Peak	Spacewatch	·	700 m	MPC · JPL
518516	2006 OE_{38}	—	July 25, 2006	Mount Lemmon	Mount Lemmon Survey	·	1.4 km	MPC · JPL
518517	2006 QL_{168}	—	August 30, 2006	Anderson Mesa	LONEOS	ADE	2.4 km	MPC · JPL
518518	2006 QZ_{187}	—	August 19, 2006	Kitt Peak	Spacewatch	THM	2.0 km	MPC · JPL
518519	2006 QC_{188}	—	August 28, 2006	Kitt Peak	Spacewatch	·	1.5 km	MPC · JPL
518520	2006 QD_{188}	—	August 28, 2006	Kitt Peak	Spacewatch	·	2.6 km	MPC · JPL
518521	2006 QF_{188}	—	August 29, 2006	Kitt Peak	Spacewatch	·	1.7 km	MPC · JPL
518522	2006 RO_{17}	—	August 29, 2006	Anderson Mesa	LONEOS	·	1.1 km	MPC · JPL
518523 Bryanshumaker	2006 SV	Bryanshumaker	September 16, 2006	Vail-Jarnac	D. H. Levy, Glinos, T.	·	1.7 km	MPC · JPL
518524	2006 SZ_{11}	—	September 16, 2006	Catalina	CSS	·	1.4 km	MPC · JPL
518525	2006 ST_{91}	—	September 18, 2006	Kitt Peak	Spacewatch	·	1.1 km	MPC · JPL
518526	2006 ST_{110}	—	September 20, 2006	Palomar	NEAT	·	2.5 km	MPC · JPL
518527	2006 SU_{237}	—	September 18, 2006	Kitt Peak	Spacewatch	·	1.7 km	MPC · JPL
518528	2006 SE_{285}	—	September 17, 2006	Socorro	LINEAR	·	2.8 km	MPC · JPL
518529	2006 SE_{405}	—	September 28, 2006	Kitt Peak	Spacewatch	·	2.1 km	MPC · JPL
518530	2006 SF_{416}	—	September 19, 2006	Kitt Peak	Spacewatch	EOS	1.6 km	MPC · JPL
518531	2006 SH_{416}	—	September 19, 2006	Kitt Peak	Spacewatch	·	2.3 km	MPC · JPL
518532	2006 TT_{31}	—	October 12, 2006	Kitt Peak	Spacewatch	·	1.3 km	MPC · JPL
518533	2006 TR_{76}	—	October 11, 2006	Palomar	NEAT	·	1.6 km	MPC · JPL
518534	2006 TF_{82}	—	October 13, 2006	Kitt Peak	Spacewatch	·	1.4 km	MPC · JPL
518535	2006 UH_{175}	—	October 16, 2006	Catalina	CSS	EUN	1.1 km	MPC · JPL
518536	2006 UN_{240}	—	October 23, 2006	Kitt Peak	Spacewatch	·	560 m	MPC · JPL
518537	2006 UO_{338}	—	October 28, 2006	Mount Lemmon	Mount Lemmon Survey	·	1.9 km	MPC · JPL
518538	2006 UH_{363}	—	October 20, 2006	Kitt Peak	Spacewatch	·	600 m	MPC · JPL
518539	2006 UJ_{363}	—	October 20, 2006	Kitt Peak	Spacewatch	THM	2.0 km	MPC · JPL
518540	2006 UL_{363}	—	October 22, 2006	Kitt Peak	Spacewatch	EOS	1.4 km	MPC · JPL
518541	2006 VD_{59}	—	October 22, 2006	Mount Lemmon	Mount Lemmon Survey	HOF	2.1 km	MPC · JPL
518542	2006 VA_{76}	—	November 12, 2006	Mount Lemmon	Mount Lemmon Survey	·	640 m	MPC · JPL
518543	2006 WV_{28}	—	November 19, 2006	Kitt Peak	Spacewatch	·	800 m	MPC · JPL
518544	2006 WO_{93}	—	November 19, 2006	Kitt Peak	Spacewatch	·	2.1 km	MPC · JPL
518545	2006 WB_{208}	—	November 17, 2006	Kitt Peak	Spacewatch	·	1.1 km	MPC · JPL
518546	2006 WC_{208}	—	November 17, 2006	Kitt Peak	Spacewatch	EOS	1.8 km	MPC · JPL
518547	2006 WF_{208}	—	November 20, 2006	Kitt Peak	Spacewatch	·	2.9 km	MPC · JPL
518548	2006 XF_{74}	—	December 13, 2006	Kitt Peak	Spacewatch	·	2.5 km	MPC · JPL
518549	2006 YJ_{39}	—	November 23, 2006	Mount Lemmon	Mount Lemmon Survey	·	1.9 km	MPC · JPL
518550	2006 YV_{56}	—	December 26, 2006	Kitt Peak	Spacewatch	V	680 m	MPC · JPL
518551	2007 AH_{10}	—	December 27, 2006	Mount Lemmon	Mount Lemmon Survey	H	520 m	MPC · JPL
518552	2007 BJ_{103}	—	September 30, 2005	Anderson Mesa	LONEOS	EOS	2.3 km	MPC · JPL
518553	2007 DD_{28}	—	February 17, 2007	Kitt Peak	Spacewatch	NYS	810 m	MPC · JPL
518554	2007 DZ_{43}	—	February 17, 2007	Mount Lemmon	Mount Lemmon Survey	·	650 m	MPC · JPL
518555	2007 DV_{118}	—	February 25, 2007	Kitt Peak	Spacewatch	·	880 m	MPC · JPL
518556	2007 ET_{130}	—	March 9, 2007	Mount Lemmon	Mount Lemmon Survey	·	1.8 km	MPC · JPL
518557	2007 EC_{132}	—	February 27, 2007	Kitt Peak	Spacewatch	·	890 m	MPC · JPL
518558	2007 EF_{172}	—	March 14, 2007	Kitt Peak	Spacewatch	EOS	1.6 km	MPC · JPL
518559	2007 EA_{176}	—	March 14, 2007	Kitt Peak	Spacewatch	·	2.3 km	MPC · JPL
518560	2007 EH_{196}	—	March 15, 2007	Kitt Peak	Spacewatch	NYS	800 m	MPC · JPL
518561	2007 EL_{226}	—	March 15, 2007	Kitt Peak	Spacewatch	·	3.1 km	MPC · JPL
518562	2007 FV_{21}	—	February 17, 2007	Kitt Peak	Spacewatch	·	830 m	MPC · JPL
518563	2007 GL_{2}	—	March 20, 2007	Catalina	CSS	·	1.1 km	MPC · JPL
518564	2007 GP_{23}	—	March 13, 2007	Mount Lemmon	Mount Lemmon Survey	·	1.1 km	MPC · JPL
518565	2007 GL_{62}	—	March 10, 2003	Campo Imperatore	CINEOS	·	1.6 km	MPC · JPL
518566	2007 HD_{39}	—	February 22, 2003	Kitt Peak	Spacewatch	NYS	900 m	MPC · JPL
518567	2007 HB_{55}	—	April 22, 2007	Kitt Peak	Spacewatch	·	1.2 km	MPC · JPL
518568	2007 HO_{67}	—	April 23, 2007	Kitt Peak	Spacewatch	·	880 m	MPC · JPL
518569	2007 HV_{71}	—	April 14, 2007	Kitt Peak	Spacewatch	·	890 m	MPC · JPL
518570	2007 HJ_{72}	—	April 14, 2007	Kitt Peak	Spacewatch	·	990 m	MPC · JPL
518571	2007 HL_{80}	—	April 14, 2007	Mount Lemmon	Mount Lemmon Survey	·	1.8 km	MPC · JPL
518572	2007 HG_{99}	—	March 9, 2007	Mount Lemmon	Mount Lemmon Survey	EOS	1.5 km	MPC · JPL
518573	2007 HO_{99}	—	April 19, 2007	Mount Lemmon	Mount Lemmon Survey	·	1.6 km	MPC · JPL
518574	2007 HP_{99}	—	April 22, 2007	Kitt Peak	Spacewatch	·	2.1 km	MPC · JPL
518575	2007 JP_{46}	—	April 20, 2007	Mount Lemmon	Mount Lemmon Survey	KRM	1.9 km	MPC · JPL
518576	2007 JR_{46}	—	May 11, 2007	Mount Lemmon	Mount Lemmon Survey	·	2.0 km	MPC · JPL
518577	2007 KP_{2}	—	March 28, 2007	Siding Spring	SSS	·	4.0 km	MPC · JPL
518578	2007 LM_{22}	—	June 13, 2007	Kitt Peak	Spacewatch	EOS	2.0 km	MPC · JPL
518579	2007 LT_{36}	—	April 25, 2007	Mount Lemmon	Mount Lemmon Survey	·	3.2 km	MPC · JPL
518580	2007 MP	—	April 15, 2007	Kitt Peak	Spacewatch	·	2.5 km	MPC · JPL
518581	2007 PB_{51}	—	August 10, 2007	Kitt Peak	Spacewatch	·	1.4 km	MPC · JPL
518582	2007 QD_{18}	—	May 7, 2006	Kitt Peak	Spacewatch	TEL	1.6 km	MPC · JPL
518583	2007 TO_{455}	—	October 9, 2007	Kitt Peak	Spacewatch	·	1.8 km	MPC · JPL
518584	2007 TR_{455}	—	October 10, 2007	Mount Lemmon	Mount Lemmon Survey	·	2.3 km	MPC · JPL
518585	2007 TT_{455}	—	October 11, 2007	Kitt Peak	Spacewatch	EOS	1.8 km	MPC · JPL
518586	2007 TW_{455}	—	October 12, 2007	Kitt Peak	Spacewatch	KOR	1.1 km	MPC · JPL
518587	2007 TY_{455}	—	October 6, 2007	Kitt Peak	Spacewatch	V	550 m	MPC · JPL
518588	2007 TZ_{455}	—	October 14, 2007	Mount Lemmon	Mount Lemmon Survey	EOS	1.8 km	MPC · JPL
518589	2007 UJ_{143}	—	October 18, 2007	Kitt Peak	Spacewatch	·	3.6 km	MPC · JPL
518590	2007 VS_{79}	—	November 3, 2007	Kitt Peak	Spacewatch	·	1.5 km	MPC · JPL
518591	2007 VB_{107}	—	November 3, 2007	Kitt Peak	Spacewatch	·	1.3 km	MPC · JPL
518592	2007 VQ_{338}	—	November 2, 2007	Kitt Peak	Spacewatch	·	1.9 km	MPC · JPL
518593	2007 VR_{338}	—	November 2, 2007	Kitt Peak	Spacewatch	EOS	1.6 km	MPC · JPL
518594	2007 VS_{338}	—	November 2, 2007	Kitt Peak	Spacewatch	·	870 m	MPC · JPL
518595	2007 VT_{338}	—	November 3, 2007	Kitt Peak	Spacewatch	·	1.7 km	MPC · JPL
518596	2007 VW_{338}	—	November 3, 2007	Kitt Peak	Spacewatch	·	1.2 km	MPC · JPL
518597	2007 VB_{339}	—	September 10, 2007	Mount Lemmon	Mount Lemmon Survey	·	2.7 km	MPC · JPL
518598	2007 VC_{339}	—	November 7, 2007	Kitt Peak	Spacewatch	EOS	1.7 km	MPC · JPL
518599	2007 VH_{339}	—	November 9, 2007	Kitt Peak	Spacewatch	·	2.6 km	MPC · JPL
518600	2007 VJ_{339}	—	November 9, 2007	Kitt Peak	Spacewatch	·	1.4 km	MPC · JPL

== 518601–518700 ==
back to top

Designation			Discovery			Properties		Ref
Permanent	Provisional	Named after	Date	Site	Discoverer(s)	Category	Diam.	Ref
518601	2007 VM_{339}	—	September 30, 2006	Mount Lemmon	Mount Lemmon Survey	·	2.0 km	MPC · JPL
518602	2007 VO_{339}	—	November 13, 2007	Kitt Peak	Spacewatch	·	2.0 km	MPC · JPL
518603	2007 XP_{60}	—	September 17, 2006	Kitt Peak	Spacewatch	PAD	1.3 km	MPC · JPL
518604	2007 YU_{29}	—	December 28, 2007	Kitt Peak	Spacewatch	·	1.7 km	MPC · JPL
518605	2007 YO_{75}	—	December 17, 2007	Kitt Peak	Spacewatch	·	1.8 km	MPC · JPL
518606	2007 YQ_{75}	—	December 30, 2007	Kitt Peak	Spacewatch	V	670 m	MPC · JPL
518607	2007 YR_{75}	—	December 31, 2007	Mount Lemmon	Mount Lemmon Survey	THM	1.8 km	MPC · JPL
518608	2007 YT_{75}	—	December 31, 2007	Kitt Peak	Spacewatch	MAR	1.0 km	MPC · JPL
518609	2008 AC_{56}	—	January 11, 2008	Kitt Peak	Spacewatch	KOR	1.2 km	MPC · JPL
518610	2008 AD_{86}	—	November 3, 2011	Kitt Peak	Spacewatch	·	1.5 km	MPC · JPL
518611	2008 AG_{103}	—	January 15, 2008	Kitt Peak	Spacewatch	·	1.6 km	MPC · JPL
518612	2008 AA_{117}	—	February 1, 1995	Kitt Peak	Spacewatch	WIT	980 m	MPC · JPL
518613	2008 AV_{138}	—	January 11, 2008	Kitt Peak	Spacewatch	3:2	4.0 km	MPC · JPL
518614	2008 AZ_{138}	—	January 1, 2008	Kitt Peak	Spacewatch	·	2.4 km	MPC · JPL
518615	2008 AA_{139}	—	January 10, 2008	Kitt Peak	Spacewatch	EOS	2.3 km	MPC · JPL
518616	2008 BV_{54}	—	October 2, 2006	Mount Lemmon	Mount Lemmon Survey	KOR	1.5 km	MPC · JPL
518617	2008 CO_{23}	—	April 10, 2005	Kitt Peak	Spacewatch	·	540 m	MPC · JPL
518618	2008 CE_{218}	—	February 1, 2008	Kitt Peak	Spacewatch	·	1.2 km	MPC · JPL
518619	2008 CH_{218}	—	February 7, 2008	Kitt Peak	Spacewatch	·	2.0 km	MPC · JPL
518620	2008 CJ_{218}	—	August 28, 2005	Kitt Peak	Spacewatch	EOS	2.0 km	MPC · JPL
518621	2008 CK_{218}	—	February 8, 2008	Kitt Peak	Spacewatch	·	2.0 km	MPC · JPL
518622	2008 CO_{218}	—	February 13, 2008	Kitt Peak	Spacewatch	·	910 m	MPC · JPL
518623	2008 CQ_{218}	—	February 13, 2008	Kitt Peak	Spacewatch	·	2.3 km	MPC · JPL
518624	2008 DG_{90}	—	February 28, 2008	Kitt Peak	Spacewatch	·	2.4 km	MPC · JPL
518625	2008 ES_{171}	—	March 10, 2008	Kitt Peak	Spacewatch	·	870 m	MPC · JPL
518626	2008 ET_{171}	—	March 10, 2008	Kitt Peak	Spacewatch	·	1.4 km	MPC · JPL
518627	2008 EU_{171}	—	September 27, 2005	Kitt Peak	Spacewatch	·	1.2 km	MPC · JPL
518628	2008 FU_{138}	—	October 20, 2006	Kitt Peak	Spacewatch	·	640 m	MPC · JPL
518629	2008 FW_{138}	—	March 30, 2008	Kitt Peak	Spacewatch	·	1.2 km	MPC · JPL
518630	2008 GP_{70}	—	April 6, 2008	Mount Lemmon	Mount Lemmon Survey	·	710 m	MPC · JPL
518631	2008 GB_{79}	—	April 7, 2008	Kitt Peak	Spacewatch	·	660 m	MPC · JPL
518632	2008 GJ_{119}	—	April 11, 2008	Mount Lemmon	Mount Lemmon Survey	·	2.4 km	MPC · JPL
518633	2008 GY_{148}	—	January 25, 2007	Kitt Peak	Spacewatch	THM	2.0 km	MPC · JPL
518634	2008 GB_{149}	—	April 5, 2008	Kitt Peak	Spacewatch	·	850 m	MPC · JPL
518635	2008 HO_{3}	—	April 29, 2008	Mount Lemmon	Mount Lemmon Survey	T_{j} (2.89) · AMO · APO +1km	830 m	MPC · JPL
518636	2008 HJ_{71}	—	April 26, 2008	Kitt Peak	Spacewatch	·	1.4 km	MPC · JPL
518637	2008 JQ_{4}	—	May 2, 2008	Kitt Peak	Spacewatch	·	660 m	MPC · JPL
518638	2008 JP_{14}	—	May 1, 2008	Catalina	CSS	APO	490 m	MPC · JPL
518639	2008 JC_{42}	—	May 5, 2008	Mount Lemmon	Mount Lemmon Survey	·	1.2 km	MPC · JPL
518640	2008 KZ_{5}	—	May 29, 2008	Kitt Peak	Spacewatch	AMO · APO · PHA	350 m	MPC · JPL
518641	2008 MY_{3}	—	June 30, 2008	Kitt Peak	Spacewatch	V	540 m	MPC · JPL
518642	2008 OY_{25}	—	July 29, 2008	Kitt Peak	Spacewatch	·	1.8 km	MPC · JPL
518643	2008 OZ_{25}	—	July 30, 2008	Mount Lemmon	Mount Lemmon Survey	·	2.3 km	MPC · JPL
518644	2008 PO_{7}	—	July 26, 2008	Siding Spring	SSS	·	560 m	MPC · JPL
518645	2008 PL_{12}	—	July 30, 2008	Mount Lemmon	Mount Lemmon Survey	·	470 m	MPC · JPL
518646	2008 QD_{1}	—	August 23, 2008	Siding Spring	SSS	AMO	530 m	MPC · JPL
518647	2008 QG_{46}	—	August 24, 2008	Socorro	LINEAR	·	3.1 km	MPC · JPL
518648	2008 RQ_{19}	—	September 4, 2008	Kitt Peak	Spacewatch	AEO	1.0 km	MPC · JPL
518649	2008 RZ_{61}	—	August 5, 2008	La Sagra	OAM	·	2.6 km	MPC · JPL
518650	2008 RO_{62}	—	September 4, 2008	Kitt Peak	Spacewatch	THM	2.0 km	MPC · JPL
518651	2008 RU_{143}	—	September 6, 2008	Kitt Peak	Spacewatch	·	670 m	MPC · JPL
518652	2008 RB_{148}	—	September 2, 2008	Kitt Peak	Spacewatch	KOR	1.2 km	MPC · JPL
518653	2008 RE_{148}	—	September 3, 2008	Kitt Peak	Spacewatch	·	1.8 km	MPC · JPL
518654	2008 RG_{148}	—	September 3, 2008	Kitt Peak	Spacewatch	·	2.1 km	MPC · JPL
518655	2008 RK_{148}	—	September 4, 2008	Kitt Peak	Spacewatch	·	2.2 km	MPC · JPL
518656	2008 RM_{148}	—	September 5, 2008	Kitt Peak	Spacewatch	·	1.9 km	MPC · JPL
518657	2008 RU_{148}	—	February 25, 2006	Kitt Peak	Spacewatch	·	1.7 km	MPC · JPL
518658	2008 SF_{37}	—	September 20, 2008	Kitt Peak	Spacewatch	·	2.3 km	MPC · JPL
518659	2008 SF_{141}	—	November 18, 2003	Kitt Peak	Spacewatch	·	3.4 km	MPC · JPL
518660	2008 SK_{239}	—	September 4, 2008	Kitt Peak	Spacewatch	·	3.1 km	MPC · JPL
518661	2008 ST_{252}	—	September 20, 2008	Kitt Peak	Spacewatch	(895)	3.1 km	MPC · JPL
518662	2008 SK_{268}	—	September 25, 2008	Kitt Peak	Spacewatch	LIX	2.5 km	MPC · JPL
518663	2008 SU_{312}	—	September 22, 2008	Kitt Peak	Spacewatch	·	1.8 km	MPC · JPL
518664	2008 SV_{312}	—	September 22, 2008	Mount Lemmon	Mount Lemmon Survey	PAD	1.5 km	MPC · JPL
518665	2008 SY_{312}	—	October 13, 2004	Kitt Peak	Spacewatch	·	810 m	MPC · JPL
518666	2008 SC_{313}	—	September 24, 2008	Kitt Peak	Spacewatch	THM	2.1 km	MPC · JPL
518667	2008 SD_{313}	—	September 24, 2008	Kitt Peak	Spacewatch	·	1.9 km	MPC · JPL
518668	2008 SE_{313}	—	September 24, 2008	Kitt Peak	Spacewatch	EMA	2.6 km	MPC · JPL
518669	2008 SF_{313}	—	September 24, 2008	Kitt Peak	Spacewatch	·	1.3 km	MPC · JPL
518670	2008 SG_{313}	—	February 3, 2006	Mount Lemmon	Mount Lemmon Survey	(5)	1.2 km	MPC · JPL
518671	2008 SJ_{313}	—	September 26, 2008	Kitt Peak	Spacewatch	·	2.0 km	MPC · JPL
518672	2008 TD_{181}	—	October 6, 2008	Mount Lemmon	Mount Lemmon Survey	·	3.0 km	MPC · JPL
518673	2008 TN_{190}	—	September 23, 2008	Mount Lemmon	Mount Lemmon Survey	·	1.1 km	MPC · JPL
518674	2008 TS_{192}	—	October 6, 2008	Mount Lemmon	Mount Lemmon Survey	·	1.1 km	MPC · JPL
518675	2008 TW_{192}	—	October 8, 2008	Mount Lemmon	Mount Lemmon Survey	AGN	970 m	MPC · JPL
518676	2008 UY_{46}	—	October 20, 2008	Kitt Peak	Spacewatch	·	940 m	MPC · JPL
518677	2008 UK_{76}	—	October 21, 2008	Kitt Peak	Spacewatch	H	600 m	MPC · JPL
518678	2008 UZ_{94}	—	October 28, 2008	Socorro	LINEAR	APO +1km · PHA	1.2 km	MPC · JPL
518679	2008 UR_{110}	—	October 22, 2008	Kitt Peak	Spacewatch	H	530 m	MPC · JPL
518680	2008 UV_{154}	—	September 21, 2008	Kitt Peak	Spacewatch	MAS	690 m	MPC · JPL
518681	2008 UJ_{176}	—	September 22, 2008	Kitt Peak	Spacewatch	NYS	960 m	MPC · JPL
518682	2008 UH_{199}	—	October 10, 2008	Catalina	CSS	H	450 m	MPC · JPL
518683	2008 UQ_{374}	—	October 20, 2008	Kitt Peak	Spacewatch	·	1.9 km	MPC · JPL
518684	2008 UR_{374}	—	October 20, 2008	Kitt Peak	Spacewatch	·	1.7 km	MPC · JPL
518685	2008 UU_{374}	—	October 22, 2008	Kitt Peak	Spacewatch	·	1.9 km	MPC · JPL
518686	2008 UA_{375}	—	October 25, 2008	Kitt Peak	Spacewatch	·	1.3 km	MPC · JPL
518687	2008 UC_{375}	—	October 26, 2008	Kitt Peak	Spacewatch	·	3.7 km	MPC · JPL
518688	2008 VO_{82}	—	November 9, 2008	Kitt Peak	Spacewatch	KOR	1.2 km	MPC · JPL
518689	2008 WH_{13}	—	October 8, 2008	Catalina	CSS	H	570 m	MPC · JPL
518690	2008 WO_{27}	—	October 27, 2008	Kitt Peak	Spacewatch	·	1.3 km	MPC · JPL
518691	2008 WP_{143}	—	November 18, 2008	Kitt Peak	Spacewatch	·	1.1 km	MPC · JPL
518692	2008 WT_{143}	—	November 20, 2008	Kitt Peak	Spacewatch	·	1.6 km	MPC · JPL
518693	2008 WY_{143}	—	November 30, 2008	Kitt Peak	Spacewatch	·	2.7 km	MPC · JPL
518694	2008 XJ_{57}	—	December 1, 2008	Kitt Peak	Spacewatch	·	2.2 km	MPC · JPL
518695	2008 YM_{63}	—	December 30, 2008	Mount Lemmon	Mount Lemmon Survey	·	960 m	MPC · JPL
518696	2008 YT_{101}	—	December 29, 2008	Kitt Peak	Spacewatch	CYB	4.7 km	MPC · JPL
518697	2008 YD_{140}	—	December 30, 2008	Kitt Peak	Spacewatch	·	1.3 km	MPC · JPL
518698	2008 YK_{175}	—	October 7, 2007	Mount Lemmon	Mount Lemmon Survey	·	1.6 km	MPC · JPL
518699	2008 YL_{175}	—	December 22, 2008	Kitt Peak	Spacewatch	·	1.2 km	MPC · JPL
518700	2008 YM_{175}	—	December 22, 2008	Mount Lemmon	Mount Lemmon Survey	EOS	2.0 km	MPC · JPL

== 518701–518800 ==
back to top

Designation			Discovery			Properties		Ref
Permanent	Provisional	Named after	Date	Site	Discoverer(s)	Category	Diam.	Ref
518701	2009 AD_{41}	—	January 15, 2009	Kitt Peak	Spacewatch	PHO	920 m	MPC · JPL
518702	2009 AA_{52}	—	January 1, 2009	Kitt Peak	Spacewatch	·	2.8 km	MPC · JPL
518703	2009 AB_{52}	—	January 1, 2009	Kitt Peak	Spacewatch	·	1.1 km	MPC · JPL
518704	2009 AF_{52}	—	January 1, 2009	Kitt Peak	Spacewatch	·	2.8 km	MPC · JPL
518705	2009 AK_{52}	—	January 2, 2009	Kitt Peak	Spacewatch	·	2.6 km	MPC · JPL
518706	2009 AM_{52}	—	January 2, 2009	Kitt Peak	Spacewatch	WIT	900 m	MPC · JPL
518707	2009 BJ_{25}	—	January 18, 2009	Kitt Peak	Spacewatch	·	1.2 km	MPC · JPL
518708	2009 BY_{64}	—	November 24, 2008	Mount Lemmon	Mount Lemmon Survey	·	1.9 km	MPC · JPL
518709	2009 BT_{122}	—	January 20, 2009	Kitt Peak	Spacewatch	·	1.1 km	MPC · JPL
518710	2009 BV_{175}	—	January 30, 2009	Mount Lemmon	Mount Lemmon Survey	ADE	1.5 km	MPC · JPL
518711	2009 BE_{184}	—	January 26, 2009	Socorro	LINEAR	·	1.5 km	MPC · JPL
518712	2009 BR_{192}	—	January 25, 2009	Kitt Peak	Spacewatch	·	3.1 km	MPC · JPL
518713	2009 CV_{65}	—	February 5, 2009	Catalina	CSS	·	1.5 km	MPC · JPL
518714	2009 CK_{67}	—	February 3, 2009	Kitt Peak	Spacewatch	·	2.3 km	MPC · JPL
518715	2009 CL_{67}	—	February 5, 2009	Kitt Peak	Spacewatch	·	650 m	MPC · JPL
518716	2009 DA_{8}	—	April 4, 2005	Catalina	CSS	·	1.9 km	MPC · JPL
518717	2009 DH_{32}	—	February 20, 2009	Kitt Peak	Spacewatch	·	1.3 km	MPC · JPL
518718	2009 DP_{44}	—	January 18, 2009	Kitt Peak	Spacewatch	·	1.5 km	MPC · JPL
518719	2009 DX_{56}	—	January 18, 2009	Mount Lemmon	Mount Lemmon Survey	JUN	880 m	MPC · JPL
518720	2009 DG_{60}	—	January 20, 2009	Kitt Peak	Spacewatch	·	1.6 km	MPC · JPL
518721	2009 DA_{90}	—	January 18, 2009	Kitt Peak	Spacewatch	·	1 km	MPC · JPL
518722	2009 DH_{145}	—	January 18, 2009	Kitt Peak	Spacewatch	·	2.5 km	MPC · JPL
518723	2009 DL_{145}	—	February 20, 2009	Kitt Peak	Spacewatch	TIR	2.7 km	MPC · JPL
518724	2009 DM_{145}	—	February 20, 2009	Kitt Peak	Spacewatch	(5)	1.2 km	MPC · JPL
518725	2009 DN_{145}	—	July 5, 2005	Kitt Peak	Spacewatch	THM	2.2 km	MPC · JPL
518726	2009 EO_{22}	—	March 2, 2009	Mount Lemmon	Mount Lemmon Survey	·	1.8 km	MPC · JPL
518727	2009 FL_{6}	—	March 16, 2009	Kitt Peak	Spacewatch	EUN	1.1 km	MPC · JPL
518728	2009 FL_{70}	—	March 19, 2009	Kitt Peak	Spacewatch	·	1.7 km	MPC · JPL
518729	2009 FC_{80}	—	March 31, 2009	Mount Lemmon	Mount Lemmon Survey	·	1.4 km	MPC · JPL
518730	2009 FE_{80}	—	March 19, 2009	Kitt Peak	Spacewatch	·	1.3 km	MPC · JPL
518731	2009 FF_{80}	—	February 2, 2005	Kitt Peak	Spacewatch	·	1.2 km	MPC · JPL
518732	2009 GM_{2}	—	April 1, 2009	Catalina	CSS	·	2.2 km	MPC · JPL
518733	2009 HA_{4}	—	March 29, 2009	Mount Lemmon	Mount Lemmon Survey	·	1.6 km	MPC · JPL
518734	2009 HJ_{4}	—	April 17, 2009	Kitt Peak	Spacewatch	·	1.7 km	MPC · JPL
518735	2009 JL_{1}	—	May 5, 2009	Kitt Peak	Spacewatch	APO	210 m	MPC · JPL
518736	2009 MC_{7}	—	February 28, 2008	Mount Lemmon	Mount Lemmon Survey	·	1.9 km	MPC · JPL
518737	2009 OO_{9}	—	July 29, 2009	Cerro Burek	Burek, Cerro	APO	570 m	MPC · JPL
518738	2009 PL_{15}	—	August 15, 2009	Catalina	CSS	·	1.9 km	MPC · JPL
518739	2009 PT_{21}	—	April 1, 2008	Mount Lemmon	Mount Lemmon Survey	·	1.0 km	MPC · JPL
518740	2009 PV_{21}	—	August 15, 2009	Kitt Peak	Spacewatch	·	1.8 km	MPC · JPL
518741	2009 QZ_{65}	—	October 9, 2004	Kitt Peak	Spacewatch	THM	2.3 km	MPC · JPL
518742	2009 QC_{66}	—	August 18, 2009	Kitt Peak	Spacewatch	EOS	1.8 km	MPC · JPL
518743	2009 QG_{66}	—	March 16, 2007	Mount Lemmon	Mount Lemmon Survey	KOR	1.2 km	MPC · JPL
518744	2009 RP_{71}	—	September 15, 2009	Kitt Peak	Spacewatch	·	670 m	MPC · JPL
518745	2009 RX_{76}	—	September 15, 2009	Kitt Peak	Spacewatch	·	1.3 km	MPC · JPL
518746	2009 SY_{73}	—	September 17, 2009	Kitt Peak	Spacewatch	·	2.1 km	MPC · JPL
518747	2009 SR_{97}	—	September 18, 2009	Mount Lemmon	Mount Lemmon Survey	HYG	2.5 km	MPC · JPL
518748	2009 SQ_{162}	—	September 21, 2009	Mount Lemmon	Mount Lemmon Survey	·	1.5 km	MPC · JPL
518749	2009 SB_{164}	—	September 21, 2009	Kitt Peak	Spacewatch	·	2.4 km	MPC · JPL
518750	2009 SG_{238}	—	September 16, 2009	Catalina	CSS	EOS	2.4 km	MPC · JPL
518751	2009 SQ_{332}	—	September 22, 2009	La Sagra	OAM	·	4.4 km	MPC · JPL
518752	2009 SU_{371}	—	September 24, 2009	Mount Lemmon	Mount Lemmon Survey	·	820 m	MPC · JPL
518753	2009 SV_{371}	—	September 26, 2009	Kitt Peak	Spacewatch	·	720 m	MPC · JPL
518754	2009 SW_{371}	—	October 8, 2004	Kitt Peak	Spacewatch	·	3.0 km	MPC · JPL
518755	2009 SZ_{371}	—	September 28, 2009	Mount Lemmon	Mount Lemmon Survey	·	2.6 km	MPC · JPL
518756	2009 TC_{2}	—	September 25, 2009	Catalina	CSS	·	3.0 km	MPC · JPL
518757	2009 TL_{5}	—	May 7, 2008	Mount Lemmon	Mount Lemmon Survey	·	1.9 km	MPC · JPL
518758	2009 TJ_{46}	—	October 15, 2009	Mount Lemmon	Mount Lemmon Survey	·	3.8 km	MPC · JPL
518759	2009 TX_{49}	—	September 30, 2005	Mount Lemmon	Mount Lemmon Survey	(5)	1.1 km	MPC · JPL
518760	2009 UP_{60}	—	September 28, 2009	Mount Lemmon	Mount Lemmon Survey	·	2.0 km	MPC · JPL
518761	2009 UH_{90}	—	October 26, 2009	Mount Lemmon	Mount Lemmon Survey	·	2.4 km	MPC · JPL
518762	2009 UK_{100}	—	October 23, 2009	Mount Lemmon	Mount Lemmon Survey	·	2.9 km	MPC · JPL
518763	2009 UN_{159}	—	October 24, 2009	Kitt Peak	Spacewatch	·	4.8 km	MPC · JPL
518764	2009 UG_{160}	—	May 11, 2007	Mount Lemmon	Mount Lemmon Survey	·	2.2 km	MPC · JPL
518765	2009 UM_{160}	—	October 24, 2009	Kitt Peak	Spacewatch	·	1.7 km	MPC · JPL
518766	2009 UP_{160}	—	December 2, 2005	Mount Lemmon	Mount Lemmon Survey	·	1.3 km	MPC · JPL
518767	2009 UQ_{160}	—	October 26, 2009	Kitt Peak	Spacewatch	·	1.9 km	MPC · JPL
518768	2009 UR_{160}	—	October 27, 2009	Mount Lemmon	Mount Lemmon Survey	·	1.6 km	MPC · JPL
518769	2009 VX_{58}	—	November 9, 2009	Catalina	CSS	·	640 m	MPC · JPL
518770	2009 VB_{119}	—	November 9, 2009	Kitt Peak	Spacewatch	·	2.9 km	MPC · JPL
518771	2009 WL_{1}	—	November 17, 2009	Socorro	LINEAR	AMO	700 m	MPC · JPL
518772	2009 WG_{173}	—	November 18, 2009	Kitt Peak	Spacewatch	V	630 m	MPC · JPL
518773	2009 WW_{207}	—	October 16, 2009	Mount Lemmon	Mount Lemmon Survey	·	2.9 km	MPC · JPL
518774	2009 WL_{237}	—	September 22, 2009	Mount Lemmon	Mount Lemmon Survey	·	2.5 km	MPC · JPL
518775	2009 WV_{253}	—	November 9, 2009	Mount Lemmon	Mount Lemmon Survey	·	950 m	MPC · JPL
518776	2009 WT_{270}	—	November 24, 2009	Kitt Peak	Spacewatch	·	1.3 km	MPC · JPL
518777	2009 WU_{270}	—	November 25, 2009	Kitt Peak	Spacewatch	MAR	1.2 km	MPC · JPL
518778	2010 AW_{130}	—	April 16, 2004	Kitt Peak	Spacewatch	LUT	4.6 km	MPC · JPL
518779	2010 AN_{133}	—	October 16, 2009	Catalina	CSS	·	4.1 km	MPC · JPL
518780	2010 AH_{137}	—	March 21, 2010	Kitt Peak	Spacewatch	·	2.5 km	MPC · JPL
518781	2010 AL_{138}	—	January 15, 2010	WISE	WISE	·	4.2 km	MPC · JPL
518782	2010 AB_{141}	—	January 8, 2010	Kitt Peak	Spacewatch	·	1.7 km	MPC · JPL
518783	2010 AE_{141}	—	December 20, 2009	Kitt Peak	Spacewatch	·	1.5 km	MPC · JPL
518784	2010 BK_{5}	—	February 25, 2006	Kitt Peak	Spacewatch	AGN	1.1 km	MPC · JPL
518785	2010 BS_{11}	—	September 14, 2007	Mount Lemmon	Mount Lemmon Survey	·	2.4 km	MPC · JPL
518786	2010 BV_{20}	—	April 18, 2015	Haleakala	Pan-STARRS 1	·	3.4 km	MPC · JPL
518787	2010 BP_{24}	—	July 29, 2008	Kitt Peak	Spacewatch	CYB	4.3 km	MPC · JPL
518788	2010 BL_{44}	—	September 27, 2009	Mount Lemmon	Mount Lemmon Survey	·	4.1 km	MPC · JPL
518789	2010 BH_{53}	—	January 20, 2010	WISE	WISE	·	2.4 km	MPC · JPL
518790	2010 BO_{53}	—	January 20, 2010	WISE	WISE	·	2.7 km	MPC · JPL
518791	2010 BD_{56}	—	September 27, 2009	Mount Lemmon	Mount Lemmon Survey	KON	2.3 km	MPC · JPL
518792	2010 BQ_{68}	—	January 22, 2010	WISE	WISE	·	2.6 km	MPC · JPL
518793	2010 BY_{73}	—	October 24, 2008	Kitt Peak	Spacewatch	·	2.0 km	MPC · JPL
518794	2010 BF_{76}	—	February 9, 2005	Kitt Peak	Spacewatch	·	2.8 km	MPC · JPL
518795	2010 BH_{84}	—	January 25, 2010	WISE	WISE	·	2.1 km	MPC · JPL
518796	2010 BJ_{84}	—	February 1, 2006	Mount Lemmon	Mount Lemmon Survey	·	1.7 km	MPC · JPL
518797	2010 BP_{88}	—	May 12, 2013	Haleakala	Pan-STARRS 1	·	2.5 km	MPC · JPL
518798	2010 BU_{91}	—	January 26, 2010	WISE	WISE	CYB	4.3 km	MPC · JPL
518799	2010 BJ_{92}	—	December 6, 2005	Kitt Peak	Spacewatch	·	2.7 km	MPC · JPL
518800	2010 BD_{94}	—	August 13, 1999	Kitt Peak	Spacewatch	(45637) · CYB	4.0 km	MPC · JPL

== 518801–518900 ==
back to top

Designation			Discovery			Properties		Ref
Permanent	Provisional	Named after	Date	Site	Discoverer(s)	Category	Diam.	Ref
518801	2010 BM_{94}	—	January 27, 2010	WISE	WISE	·	1.7 km	MPC · JPL
518802	2010 BU_{97}	—	January 27, 2010	WISE	WISE	·	3.6 km	MPC · JPL
518803	2010 BL_{107}	—	October 14, 2009	Mount Lemmon	Mount Lemmon Survey	EOS	3.2 km	MPC · JPL
518804	2010 BP_{110}	—	July 20, 2010	WISE	WISE	·	4.0 km	MPC · JPL
518805	2010 BG_{112}	—	December 16, 2004	Kitt Peak	Spacewatch	·	3.7 km	MPC · JPL
518806	2010 BY_{126}	—	January 31, 2010	WISE	WISE	EMA	4.4 km	MPC · JPL
518807	2010 BV_{127}	—	January 31, 2010	WISE	WISE	·	3.9 km	MPC · JPL
518808	2010 CN_{7}	—	February 6, 2010	WISE	WISE	·	3.5 km	MPC · JPL
518809	2010 CE_{14}	—	February 10, 2010	WISE	WISE	·	4.8 km	MPC · JPL
518810	2010 CF_{19}	—	February 14, 2010	Socorro	LINEAR	APO · PHA	80 m	MPC · JPL
518811	2010 CN_{43}	—	January 6, 2010	Kitt Peak	Spacewatch	·	3.2 km	MPC · JPL
518812	2010 CC_{46}	—	February 12, 2010	WISE	WISE	·	3.8 km	MPC · JPL
518813	2010 CH_{48}	—	February 12, 2010	WISE	WISE	·	2.6 km	MPC · JPL
518814	2010 CG_{49}	—	February 12, 2010	WISE	WISE	PHO	3.4 km	MPC · JPL
518815	2010 CQ_{53}	—	November 25, 2009	Mount Lemmon	Mount Lemmon Survey	EMA	3.6 km	MPC · JPL
518816	2010 CZ_{53}	—	February 14, 2010	WISE	WISE	·	3.6 km	MPC · JPL
518817	2010 CB_{93}	—	May 26, 2006	Mount Lemmon	Mount Lemmon Survey	·	4.2 km	MPC · JPL
518818	2010 CP_{104}	—	February 14, 2010	Mount Lemmon	Mount Lemmon Survey	·	2.2 km	MPC · JPL
518819	2010 CY_{110}	—	February 14, 2010	Mount Lemmon	Mount Lemmon Survey	·	2.7 km	MPC · JPL
518820	2010 CG_{114}	—	February 14, 2010	Mount Lemmon	Mount Lemmon Survey	·	3.1 km	MPC · JPL
518821	2010 CS_{114}	—	February 5, 2010	Kitt Peak	Spacewatch	V	590 m	MPC · JPL
518822	2010 CW_{134}	—	February 10, 2010	WISE	WISE	·	1.9 km	MPC · JPL
518823	2010 CD_{140}	—	February 15, 2010	WISE	WISE	·	3.7 km	MPC · JPL
518824	2010 CZ_{163}	—	February 20, 2006	Kitt Peak	Spacewatch	MAR	1.3 km	MPC · JPL
518825	2010 CM_{169}	—	February 9, 2010	Mount Lemmon	Mount Lemmon Survey	·	1.5 km	MPC · JPL
518826	2010 CB_{182}	—	February 15, 2010	Mount Lemmon	Mount Lemmon Survey	NYS	1.0 km	MPC · JPL
518827	2010 CB_{184}	—	November 2, 2008	Kitt Peak	Spacewatch	TIR	2.6 km	MPC · JPL
518828	2010 CC_{184}	—	February 5, 2010	Catalina	CSS	·	3.9 km	MPC · JPL
518829	2010 CJ_{187}	—	February 10, 2010	WISE	WISE	·	3.4 km	MPC · JPL
518830	2010 CH_{195}	—	February 13, 2010	WISE	WISE	·	4.5 km	MPC · JPL
518831	2010 CJ_{195}	—	February 13, 2010	WISE	WISE	·	1.8 km	MPC · JPL
518832	2010 CK_{199}	—	November 9, 2007	Kitt Peak	Spacewatch	·	2.8 km	MPC · JPL
518833	2010 CW_{199}	—	February 20, 2006	Kitt Peak	Spacewatch	·	2.9 km	MPC · JPL
518834	2010 CM_{200}	—	February 15, 2010	WISE	WISE	·	1.5 km	MPC · JPL
518835	2010 CV_{221}	—	February 8, 2010	WISE	WISE	EUN	2.5 km	MPC · JPL
518836	2010 CO_{223}	—	July 29, 2008	Kitt Peak	Spacewatch	CYB	2.6 km	MPC · JPL
518837	2010 CX_{223}	—	February 8, 2010	WISE	WISE	·	1.9 km	MPC · JPL
518838	2010 CJ_{228}	—	February 9, 2010	WISE	WISE	·	2.5 km	MPC · JPL
518839	2010 CD_{232}	—	February 1, 2010	WISE	WISE	·	5.2 km	MPC · JPL
518840	2010 CB_{234}	—	February 1, 2010	WISE	WISE	·	3.3 km	MPC · JPL
518841	2010 CR_{236}	—	October 27, 2009	Mount Lemmon	Mount Lemmon Survey	·	3.0 km	MPC · JPL
518842	2010 CF_{239}	—	April 25, 2007	Kitt Peak	Spacewatch	·	3.9 km	MPC · JPL
518843	2010 CC_{240}	—	October 27, 2009	Kitt Peak	Spacewatch	HOF	2.4 km	MPC · JPL
518844	2010 CH_{243}	—	February 2, 2010	WISE	WISE	EUP	4.9 km	MPC · JPL
518845	2010 CA_{251}	—	February 9, 2010	Catalina	CSS	·	1.3 km	MPC · JPL
518846	2010 CF_{252}	—	October 5, 2007	Kitt Peak	Spacewatch	EOS	1.8 km	MPC · JPL
518847	2010 DM	—	February 16, 2010	Mount Lemmon	Mount Lemmon Survey	APO · PHA	570 m	MPC · JPL
518848	2010 DA_{15}	—	February 16, 2010	WISE	WISE	·	4.3 km	MPC · JPL
518849	2010 DO_{17}	—	February 16, 2010	WISE	WISE	·	3.9 km	MPC · JPL
518850	2010 DK_{19}	—	February 16, 2010	WISE	WISE	·	3.2 km	MPC · JPL
518851	2010 DX_{29}	—	February 19, 2010	WISE	WISE	·	4.4 km	MPC · JPL
518852	2010 DG_{30}	—	February 19, 2010	WISE	WISE	·	4.3 km	MPC · JPL
518853	2010 DH_{33}	—	September 30, 2003	Kitt Peak	Spacewatch	·	3.3 km	MPC · JPL
518854	2010 DE_{51}	—	October 21, 2007	Mount Lemmon	Mount Lemmon Survey	·	2.0 km	MPC · JPL
518855	2010 DP_{52}	—	July 16, 2005	Kitt Peak	Spacewatch	·	2.4 km	MPC · JPL
518856	2010 DR_{54}	—	January 31, 2006	Kitt Peak	Spacewatch	·	800 m	MPC · JPL
518857	2010 DM_{60}	—	February 25, 2010	WISE	WISE	·	4.6 km	MPC · JPL
518858	2010 DK_{61}	—	February 25, 2010	WISE	WISE	·	3.1 km	MPC · JPL
518859	2010 DT_{62}	—	November 2, 2007	Kitt Peak	Spacewatch	·	4.3 km	MPC · JPL
518860	2010 DE_{64}	—	February 20, 2009	Mount Lemmon	Mount Lemmon Survey	·	5.1 km	MPC · JPL
518861	2010 DW_{65}	—	February 27, 2010	WISE	WISE	ADE	1.8 km	MPC · JPL
518862	2010 DY_{68}	—	November 27, 2009	Mount Lemmon	Mount Lemmon Survey	KON	2.5 km	MPC · JPL
518863	2010 DM_{73}	—	February 28, 2010	WISE	WISE	·	1.6 km	MPC · JPL
518864	2010 DN_{81}	—	September 23, 2008	Kitt Peak	Spacewatch	·	1.6 km	MPC · JPL
518865	2010 DB_{86}	—	February 26, 2010	WISE	WISE	TIN	4.0 km	MPC · JPL
518866	2010 DV_{87}	—	February 27, 2010	WISE	WISE	·	2.0 km	MPC · JPL
518867	2010 DP_{88}	—	November 17, 2009	Kitt Peak	Spacewatch	·	1.9 km	MPC · JPL
518868	2010 DB_{89}	—	December 10, 2009	Mount Lemmon	Mount Lemmon Survey	·	2.0 km	MPC · JPL
518869	2010 DL_{89}	—	January 9, 2006	Kitt Peak	Spacewatch	·	1.4 km	MPC · JPL
518870	2010 DW_{89}	—	December 11, 2009	Mount Lemmon	Mount Lemmon Survey	·	2.4 km	MPC · JPL
518871	2010 DV_{93}	—	September 27, 2008	Mount Lemmon	Mount Lemmon Survey	·	1.7 km	MPC · JPL
518872	2010 DZ_{93}	—	February 17, 2010	Kitt Peak	Spacewatch	·	1.1 km	MPC · JPL
518873	2010 DA_{94}	—	February 19, 2010	Kitt Peak	Spacewatch	EUN	850 m	MPC · JPL
518874	2010 ED_{9}	—	March 4, 2010	WISE	WISE	·	4.0 km	MPC · JPL
518875	2010 ER_{24}	—	September 26, 2006	Kitt Peak	Spacewatch	·	3.0 km	MPC · JPL
518876	2010 EM_{36}	—	March 12, 2010	Catalina	CSS	·	1.4 km	MPC · JPL
518877	2010 EJ_{37}	—	February 19, 2010	Mount Lemmon	Mount Lemmon Survey	PHO	890 m	MPC · JPL
518878	2010 EY_{41}	—	March 12, 2010	Mount Lemmon	Mount Lemmon Survey	·	2.2 km	MPC · JPL
518879	2010 EG_{50}	—	March 12, 2010	WISE	WISE	·	3.6 km	MPC · JPL
518880	2010 EA_{73}	—	April 17, 2005	Kitt Peak	Spacewatch	THM	1.9 km	MPC · JPL
518881	2010 EQ_{139}	—	March 13, 2010	Mount Lemmon	Mount Lemmon Survey	THM	2.0 km	MPC · JPL
518882	2010 EA_{145}	—	September 4, 2008	Kitt Peak	Spacewatch	·	2.9 km	MPC · JPL
518883	2010 EB_{148}	—	March 9, 2010	WISE	WISE	·	3.9 km	MPC · JPL
518884	2010 EY_{149}	—	September 26, 2006	Mount Lemmon	Mount Lemmon Survey	·	2.2 km	MPC · JPL
518885	2010 ET_{154}	—	March 12, 2010	WISE	WISE	·	3.4 km	MPC · JPL
518886 Wheelock	2010 EK_{157}	Wheelock	March 13, 2010	WISE	WISE	·	4.3 km	MPC · JPL
518887	2010 EM_{162}	—	December 17, 2009	Mount Lemmon	Mount Lemmon Survey	·	2.0 km	MPC · JPL
518888	2010 EW_{162}	—	December 11, 2009	Mount Lemmon	Mount Lemmon Survey	·	2.1 km	MPC · JPL
518889	2010 ET_{163}	—	April 30, 2006	Catalina	CSS	URS	3.6 km	MPC · JPL
518890	2010 EL_{169}	—	January 23, 2006	Kitt Peak	Spacewatch	·	3.8 km	MPC · JPL
518891	2010 EX_{169}	—	January 4, 2010	Kitt Peak	Spacewatch	·	4.5 km	MPC · JPL
518892	2010 EJ_{173}	—	February 18, 2010	Mount Lemmon	Mount Lemmon Survey	CYB	2.6 km	MPC · JPL
518893	2010 FL_{7}	—	March 16, 2010	WISE	WISE	VER	3.8 km	MPC · JPL
518894	2010 FF_{36}	—	March 18, 2010	WISE	WISE	·	4.0 km	MPC · JPL
518895	2010 FR_{38}	—	September 29, 2008	Mount Lemmon	Mount Lemmon Survey	·	2.9 km	MPC · JPL
518896	2010 FO_{42}	—	April 2, 2009	Mount Lemmon	Mount Lemmon Survey	·	3.5 km	MPC · JPL
518897	2010 FR_{44}	—	October 9, 2008	Mount Lemmon	Mount Lemmon Survey	EOS	3.6 km	MPC · JPL
518898	2010 FF_{58}	—	December 14, 2007	Mount Lemmon	Mount Lemmon Survey	(1118)	3.6 km	MPC · JPL
518899	2010 FO_{61}	—	December 31, 2008	Kitt Peak	Spacewatch	·	3.1 km	MPC · JPL
518900	2010 FK_{64}	—	December 17, 2009	Kitt Peak	Spacewatch	·	4.3 km	MPC · JPL

== 518901–519000 ==
back to top

Designation			Discovery			Properties		Ref
Permanent	Provisional	Named after	Date	Site	Discoverer(s)	Category	Diam.	Ref
518901	2010 FW_{73}	—	March 30, 2010	WISE	WISE	·	2.7 km	MPC · JPL
518902	2010 FF_{76}	—	December 25, 2009	Kitt Peak	Spacewatch	NAE	4.0 km	MPC · JPL
518903	2010 FA_{78}	—	February 2, 2006	Catalina	CSS	ADE	2.8 km	MPC · JPL
518904	2010 FV_{79}	—	March 31, 2010	WISE	WISE	·	5.2 km	MPC · JPL
518905	2010 FM_{86}	—	October 20, 2008	Kitt Peak	Spacewatch	·	2.5 km	MPC · JPL
518906	2010 FB_{98}	—	August 28, 2006	Kitt Peak	Spacewatch	·	3.1 km	MPC · JPL
518907	2010 FW_{107}	—	March 20, 2010	WISE	WISE	HOF	3.4 km	MPC · JPL
518908	2010 FN_{112}	—	December 16, 2009	Mount Lemmon	Mount Lemmon Survey	HOF	2.6 km	MPC · JPL
518909	2010 FH_{115}	—	September 23, 2008	Kitt Peak	Spacewatch	·	3.0 km	MPC · JPL
518910	2010 FR_{116}	—	September 28, 2009	Kitt Peak	Spacewatch	·	2.5 km	MPC · JPL
518911	2010 FW_{118}	—	March 16, 2004	Kitt Peak	Spacewatch	·	2.2 km	MPC · JPL
518912	2010 FC_{121}	—	March 31, 2010	WISE	WISE	·	3.0 km	MPC · JPL
518913	2010 GS	—	February 1, 2006	Kitt Peak	Spacewatch	·	1.8 km	MPC · JPL
518914	2010 GL_{11}	—	April 30, 2005	Kitt Peak	Spacewatch	DOR	2.3 km	MPC · JPL
518915	2010 GA_{12}	—	December 19, 2009	Kitt Peak	Spacewatch	·	2.1 km	MPC · JPL
518916	2010 GR_{17}	—	February 1, 2005	Kitt Peak	Spacewatch	·	2.7 km	MPC · JPL
518917	2010 GN_{22}	—	January 30, 2006	Kitt Peak	Spacewatch	MIS	2.3 km	MPC · JPL
518918	2010 GE_{32}	—	March 4, 2005	Kitt Peak	Spacewatch	KOR	1.3 km	MPC · JPL
518919	2010 GS_{37}	—	April 5, 2010	WISE	WISE	·	2.0 km	MPC · JPL
518920	2010 GD_{43}	—	April 7, 2010	WISE	WISE	·	4.0 km	MPC · JPL
518921	2010 GM_{45}	—	January 13, 2010	Mount Lemmon	Mount Lemmon Survey	·	2.5 km	MPC · JPL
518922	2010 GU_{49}	—	February 19, 2010	Catalina	CSS	·	4.8 km	MPC · JPL
518923	2010 GD_{50}	—	February 14, 2009	Mount Lemmon	Mount Lemmon Survey	·	2.4 km	MPC · JPL
518924	2010 GQ_{50}	—	March 4, 2005	Kitt Peak	Spacewatch	·	3.3 km	MPC · JPL
518925	2010 GW_{56}	—	September 5, 2008	Kitt Peak	Spacewatch	·	2.0 km	MPC · JPL
518926	2010 GX_{56}	—	December 20, 2009	Kitt Peak	Spacewatch	·	3.2 km	MPC · JPL
518927	2010 GP_{64}	—	April 9, 2010	WISE	WISE	·	2.6 km	MPC · JPL
518928	2010 GQ_{72}	—	February 13, 2010	Catalina	CSS	·	4.8 km	MPC · JPL
518929	2010 GT_{75}	—	April 10, 2010	WISE	WISE	DOR	2.1 km	MPC · JPL
518930	2010 GR_{77}	—	October 22, 2003	Kitt Peak	Spacewatch	·	2.3 km	MPC · JPL
518931	2010 GX_{85}	—	October 27, 2008	Kitt Peak	Spacewatch	DOR	2.7 km	MPC · JPL
518932	2010 GM_{91}	—	April 15, 2010	Mount Lemmon	Mount Lemmon Survey	EOS	2.9 km	MPC · JPL
518933	2010 GW_{92}	—	April 14, 2010	WISE	WISE	KON	2.2 km	MPC · JPL
518934	2010 GE_{94}	—	April 14, 2010	WISE	WISE	·	2.4 km	MPC · JPL
518935	2010 GC_{96}	—	November 10, 2004	Kitt Peak	Spacewatch	DOR	2.2 km	MPC · JPL
518936	2010 GR_{103}	—	April 6, 2010	Kitt Peak	Spacewatch	·	1.5 km	MPC · JPL
518937	2010 GT_{113}	—	September 15, 2007	Kitt Peak	Spacewatch	HYG	2.4 km	MPC · JPL
518938	2010 GL_{116}	—	March 5, 2006	Kitt Peak	Spacewatch	V	600 m	MPC · JPL
518939	2010 GM_{126}	—	April 10, 2010	Kitt Peak	Spacewatch	·	730 m	MPC · JPL
518940	2010 GW_{143}	—	November 8, 2007	Kitt Peak	Spacewatch	·	3.6 km	MPC · JPL
518941	2010 GV_{149}	—	August 19, 2006	Kitt Peak	Spacewatch	·	2.6 km	MPC · JPL
518942	2010 GV_{153}	—	April 15, 2010	WISE	WISE	·	1.4 km	MPC · JPL
518943	2010 GP_{163}	—	October 21, 2006	Kitt Peak	Spacewatch	·	3.6 km	MPC · JPL
518944	2010 GH_{166}	—	April 2, 2010	WISE	WISE	·	3.3 km	MPC · JPL
518945	2010 GM_{167}	—	January 10, 2010	Catalina	CSS	·	3.6 km	MPC · JPL
518946	2010 GO_{176}	—	March 14, 2010	Mount Lemmon	Mount Lemmon Survey	·	2.0 km	MPC · JPL
518947	2010 GQ_{176}	—	April 9, 2010	Mount Lemmon	Mount Lemmon Survey	·	1.6 km	MPC · JPL
518948	2010 HV_{5}	—	August 23, 2007	Kitt Peak	Spacewatch	EOS	2.3 km	MPC · JPL
518949	2010 HC_{7}	—	March 16, 2009	Kitt Peak	Spacewatch	·	2.4 km	MPC · JPL
518950	2010 HO_{7}	—	January 15, 2010	Kitt Peak	Spacewatch	·	4.1 km	MPC · JPL
518951	2010 HN_{8}	—	April 17, 2010	WISE	WISE	·	4.1 km	MPC · JPL
518952	2010 HD_{10}	—	April 17, 2010	WISE	WISE	·	3.3 km	MPC · JPL
518953	2010 HK_{11}	—	April 17, 2010	WISE	WISE	ADE	1.3 km	MPC · JPL
518954	2010 HG_{13}	—	April 18, 2010	WISE	WISE	LIX	2.6 km	MPC · JPL
518955	2010 HH_{14}	—	April 18, 2010	WISE	WISE	·	3.6 km	MPC · JPL
518956	2010 HY_{19}	—	April 18, 2010	WISE	WISE	·	2.8 km	MPC · JPL
518957	2010 HD_{27}	—	July 19, 2007	Siding Spring	SSS	·	5.2 km	MPC · JPL
518958	2010 HR_{28}	—	April 19, 2010	WISE	WISE	·	2.3 km	MPC · JPL
518959	2010 HP_{34}	—	October 23, 2008	Kitt Peak	Spacewatch	·	4.3 km	MPC · JPL
518960	2010 HF_{35}	—	April 20, 2010	WISE	WISE	·	3.3 km	MPC · JPL
518961	2010 HR_{38}	—	March 18, 2005	Catalina	CSS	ADE	2.8 km	MPC · JPL
518962	2010 HT_{40}	—	April 21, 2009	Mount Lemmon	Mount Lemmon Survey	·	4.2 km	MPC · JPL
518963	2010 HE_{43}	—	February 10, 2008	Kitt Peak	Spacewatch	·	4.1 km	MPC · JPL
518964	2010 HF_{45}	—	March 15, 2009	Kitt Peak	Spacewatch	·	2.1 km	MPC · JPL
518965	2010 HJ_{45}	—	April 23, 2010	WISE	WISE	·	2.1 km	MPC · JPL
518966	2010 HL_{45}	—	April 23, 2010	WISE	WISE	·	2.9 km	MPC · JPL
518967	2010 HN_{47}	—	April 23, 2010	WISE	WISE	·	3.1 km	MPC · JPL
518968	2010 HZ_{47}	—	January 10, 2008	Kitt Peak	Spacewatch	ELF	2.7 km	MPC · JPL
518969	2010 HL_{50}	—	April 24, 2010	WISE	WISE	·	3.9 km	MPC · JPL
518970	2010 HU_{51}	—	April 24, 2010	WISE	WISE	LUT	2.8 km	MPC · JPL
518971	2010 HE_{53}	—	September 6, 2008	Mount Lemmon	Mount Lemmon Survey	·	2.4 km	MPC · JPL
518972	2010 HX_{54}	—	May 4, 2006	Kitt Peak	Spacewatch	·	2.0 km	MPC · JPL
518973	2010 HW_{60}	—	April 13, 2005	Kitt Peak	Spacewatch	·	5.1 km	MPC · JPL
518974	2010 HC_{66}	—	April 26, 2010	WISE	WISE	·	2.3 km	MPC · JPL
518975	2010 HD_{66}	—	December 30, 2007	Kitt Peak	Spacewatch	·	3.7 km	MPC · JPL
518976	2010 HH_{67}	—	April 26, 2010	WISE	WISE	DOR	2.4 km	MPC · JPL
518977	2010 HX_{73}	—	December 20, 2009	Mount Lemmon	Mount Lemmon Survey	·	4.5 km	MPC · JPL
518978	2010 HA_{76}	—	April 28, 2010	WISE	WISE	·	2.6 km	MPC · JPL
518979	2010 HU_{88}	—	February 16, 2010	Mount Lemmon	Mount Lemmon Survey	ADE	2.4 km	MPC · JPL
518980	2010 HD_{94}	—	September 26, 2008	Kitt Peak	Spacewatch	·	3.6 km	MPC · JPL
518981	2010 HO_{95}	—	April 29, 2010	WISE	WISE	·	3.2 km	MPC · JPL
518982	2010 HR_{113}	—	October 1, 2006	Kitt Peak	Spacewatch	·	2.8 km	MPC · JPL
518983	2010 HS_{114}	—	April 20, 2010	Kitt Peak	Spacewatch	·	890 m	MPC · JPL
518984	2010 JH_{6}	—	September 23, 2006	Kitt Peak	Spacewatch	·	2.6 km	MPC · JPL
518985	2010 JO_{10}	—	May 2, 2010	WISE	WISE	·	2.2 km	MPC · JPL
518986	2010 JP_{10}	—	March 17, 2005	Mount Lemmon	Mount Lemmon Survey	·	1.6 km	MPC · JPL
518987	2010 JN_{12}	—	May 2, 2010	WISE	WISE	·	3.7 km	MPC · JPL
518988	2010 JU_{17}	—	November 18, 2006	Kitt Peak	Spacewatch	·	4.3 km	MPC · JPL
518989	2010 JB_{21}	—	November 8, 2008	Mount Lemmon	Mount Lemmon Survey	·	2.5 km	MPC · JPL
518990	2010 JV_{24}	—	January 12, 2010	Mount Lemmon	Mount Lemmon Survey	·	4.1 km	MPC · JPL
518991	2010 JP_{26}	—	February 18, 2010	Mount Lemmon	Mount Lemmon Survey	·	1.9 km	MPC · JPL
518992	2010 JY_{38}	—	September 20, 2006	Catalina	CSS	·	2.6 km	MPC · JPL
518993	2010 JK_{54}	—	February 15, 2010	Mount Lemmon	Mount Lemmon Survey	THB	3.3 km	MPC · JPL
518994	2010 JX_{56}	—	February 17, 2010	Catalina	CSS	·	4.5 km	MPC · JPL
518995	2010 JR_{57}	—	May 7, 2010	WISE	WISE	·	3.7 km	MPC · JPL
518996	2010 JB_{58}	—	October 1, 2005	Kitt Peak	Spacewatch	·	2.4 km	MPC · JPL
518997	2010 JW_{59}	—	May 8, 2010	WISE	WISE	·	4.3 km	MPC · JPL
518998	2010 JR_{60}	—	October 7, 2005	Kitt Peak	Spacewatch	URS	2.5 km	MPC · JPL
518999	2010 JU_{61}	—	May 8, 2010	WISE	WISE	·	3.2 km	MPC · JPL
519000	2010 JU_{65}	—	November 19, 2008	Kitt Peak	Spacewatch	·	2.5 km	MPC · JPL

back to top

== Meaning of names ==
As minor planet discoveries are confirmed, they are given a permanent number by the IAU's Minor Planet Center (MPC), and the discoverers can then submit names for them, following the IAU's naming conventions. The list below concerns those minor planets in the specified number-range that have received names, and explains the meanings of those names.

Official naming citations of newly named small Solar System bodies are approved and published in a bulletin by IAU's Working Group for Small Bodies Nomenclature (WGSBN). Before May 2021, citations were published in MPC's Minor Planet Circulars for many decades. Recent citations can also be found on the JPL Small-Body Database (SBDB). Until his death in 2016, German astronomer Lutz D. Schmadel compiled these citations into the Dictionary of Minor Planet Names (DMP) and regularly updated the collection.

Based on Paul Herget's The Names of the Minor Planets, Schmadel also researched the unclear origin of numerous asteroids, most of which had been named prior to World War II. This article incorporates text from this source, which is in the public domain: SBDB New namings may only be added to this list below after official publication as the preannouncement of names is condemned. The WGSBN publishes a comprehensive guideline for the naming rules of non-cometary small Solar System bodies.

Named minor planet	Provisional	This minor planet was named for...	Ref · Catalog
518458 Roblambert	2005 GL_{204}	Robert Andrew Lambert (1955–2019), a former president of the Las Vegas Astronomical Society and astronomy professor at College of Southern Nevada.	JPL · 518458
518523 Bryanshumaker	2006 SV	Bryan Shumaker (born 1949) is a urologist who helped design a dye-sensing device to treat cancer. As an accomplished and enthusiastic amateur astronomer, he has taken a leading role in the development of outreach programs in northern Michigan, particularly at the Headlands International Dark Sky Park there.	JPL · 518523
518886 Wheelock	2010 EK_{157}	Sherry Wheelock (b. 1948) is a senior software developer at IPAC at the California Institute of Technology. During her 43-year career she has developed software for astronomical image processing and instrumental calibration and has contributed to NASA missions including IRAS, 2MASS, Spitzer, WISE and NEOWISE.	IAU · 518886
