= List of minor planets: 851001–852000 =

The following is a partial list of minor planets, running from minor-planet number 851001 through 852000, inclusive. The primary data for this and other partial lists is based on JPL's "Small-Body Orbital Elements" and data available from the Minor Planet Center. Critical list information is also provided by the MPC, unless otherwise specified from Lowell Observatory. A detailed description of the table's columns and additional sources are given on the main page including a complete list of every page in this series, and a statistical break-up on the dynamical classification of minor planets.

Also see the summary list of all named bodies in numerical and alphabetical order, and the corresponding naming citations for the number range of this particular list. New namings may only be added to this list after official publication, as the preannouncement of names is condemned by the Working Group for Small Bodies Nomenclature of the International Astronomical Union.

Near-Earth obj.	MBA (inner)	MBA (outer)	Centaur
Mars-crosser	MBA (middle)	Jupiter trojan	Trans-Neptunian obj.
Unclassified

== 851001–851100 ==
Designation			Discovery			Properties		Ref
Permanent	Provisional	Named after	Date	Site	Discoverer(s)	Category	Diam.	Ref
851001	2007 TW_{117}	—	October 9, 2007	Kitt Peak	Spacewatch	·	1.4 km	MPC · JPL
851002	2007 TC_{119}	—	October 9, 2007	Mount Lemmon	Mount Lemmon Survey	·	830 m	MPC · JPL
851003	2007 TA_{120}	—	October 7, 2007	Catalina	CSS	·	850 m	MPC · JPL
851004	2007 TJ_{122}	—	October 6, 2007	Kitt Peak	Spacewatch	·	1.1 km	MPC · JPL
851005	2007 TH_{128}	—	October 6, 2007	Kitt Peak	Spacewatch	MAS	470 m	MPC · JPL
851006	2007 TJ_{128}	—	September 18, 2003	Kitt Peak	Spacewatch	·	740 m	MPC · JPL
851007	2007 TH_{135}	—	August 24, 2007	Kitt Peak	Spacewatch	·	500 m	MPC · JPL
851008	2007 TB_{139}	—	October 9, 2007	Kitt Peak	Spacewatch	·	970 m	MPC · JPL
851009	2007 TE_{142}	—	October 9, 2007	Mount Lemmon	Mount Lemmon Survey	·	900 m	MPC · JPL
851010	2007 TD_{149}	—	September 13, 2007	Mount Lemmon	Mount Lemmon Survey	(1547)	1.1 km	MPC · JPL
851011	2007 TY_{155}	—	September 20, 2007	Catalina	CSS	·	1.6 km	MPC · JPL
851012	2007 TX_{156}	—	October 9, 2007	Socorro	LINEAR	(1547)	1.0 km	MPC · JPL
851013	2007 TS_{157}	—	September 20, 2007	Catalina	CSS	·	2.7 km	MPC · JPL
851014	2007 TC_{164}	—	September 14, 2007	Mount Lemmon	Mount Lemmon Survey	·	820 m	MPC · JPL
851015	2007 TL_{164}	—	September 13, 2007	Mount Lemmon	Mount Lemmon Survey	NYS	1.0 km	MPC · JPL
851016	2007 TC_{171}	—	October 7, 2007	Mount Lemmon	Mount Lemmon Survey	·	1.3 km	MPC · JPL
851017	2007 TO_{173}	—	September 12, 2007	Mount Lemmon	Mount Lemmon Survey	THM	1.7 km	MPC · JPL
851018	2007 TT_{185}	—	October 9, 2007	XuYi	PMO NEO Survey Program	·	950 m	MPC · JPL
851019	2007 TF_{189}	—	September 11, 2007	Mount Lemmon	Mount Lemmon Survey	·	460 m	MPC · JPL
851020	2007 TL_{200}	—	September 3, 2007	Catalina	CSS	·	480 m	MPC · JPL
851021	2007 TD_{201}	—	October 8, 2007	Kitt Peak	Spacewatch	AEO	680 m	MPC · JPL
851022	2007 TJ_{201}	—	October 4, 2007	Kitt Peak	Spacewatch	·	1.5 km	MPC · JPL
851023	2007 TX_{201}	—	October 8, 2007	Mount Lemmon	Mount Lemmon Survey	·	1.3 km	MPC · JPL
851024	2007 TV_{202}	—	September 15, 2007	Mount Lemmon	Mount Lemmon Survey	MAS	520 m	MPC · JPL
851025	2007 TW_{204}	—	October 8, 2007	Mount Lemmon	Mount Lemmon Survey	·	2.0 km	MPC · JPL
851026	2007 TZ_{205}	—	October 9, 2007	Mount Lemmon	Mount Lemmon Survey	·	1.2 km	MPC · JPL
851027	2007 TJ_{208}	—	October 10, 2007	Mount Lemmon	Mount Lemmon Survey	·	680 m	MPC · JPL
851028	2007 TZ_{215}	—	September 15, 2007	Mount Lemmon	Mount Lemmon Survey	·	1.4 km	MPC · JPL
851029	2007 TC_{219}	—	August 24, 2007	Kitt Peak	Spacewatch	·	1.9 km	MPC · JPL
851030	2007 TN_{221}	—	September 12, 2007	Kitt Peak	Spacewatch	·	1.2 km	MPC · JPL
851031	2007 TG_{224}	—	October 10, 2007	Mount Lemmon	Mount Lemmon Survey	·	1.9 km	MPC · JPL
851032	2007 TW_{225}	—	October 8, 2007	Kitt Peak	Spacewatch	·	2.0 km	MPC · JPL
851033	2007 TZ_{228}	—	October 8, 2007	Kitt Peak	Spacewatch	·	600 m	MPC · JPL
851034	2007 TH_{229}	—	October 8, 2007	Kitt Peak	Spacewatch	3:2	3.4 km	MPC · JPL
851035	2007 TE_{240}	—	October 6, 2007	7300	W. K. Y. Yeung	·	2.2 km	MPC · JPL
851036	2007 TN_{242}	—	October 8, 2007	Catalina	CSS	·	1.9 km	MPC · JPL
851037	2007 TD_{243}	—	October 8, 2007	Catalina	CSS	·	1.2 km	MPC · JPL
851038	2007 TE_{252}	—	October 12, 2007	Mount Lemmon	Mount Lemmon Survey	·	770 m	MPC · JPL
851039	2007 TN_{252}	—	September 11, 2007	Mount Lemmon	Mount Lemmon Survey	·	1.1 km	MPC · JPL
851040	2007 TT_{258}	—	October 10, 2007	Mount Lemmon	Mount Lemmon Survey	·	1.0 km	MPC · JPL
851041	2007 TP_{266}	—	October 9, 2007	Kitt Peak	Spacewatch	NYS	640 m	MPC · JPL
851042	2007 TA_{271}	—	October 9, 2007	Kitt Peak	Spacewatch	·	1.4 km	MPC · JPL
851043	2007 TJ_{275}	—	September 12, 2007	Mount Lemmon	Mount Lemmon Survey	·	420 m	MPC · JPL
851044	2007 TM_{275}	—	October 11, 2007	Catalina	CSS	·	1.4 km	MPC · JPL
851045	2007 TR_{280}	—	September 14, 2007	Mount Lemmon	Mount Lemmon Survey	·	1.5 km	MPC · JPL
851046	2007 TR_{284}	—	October 9, 2007	Mount Lemmon	Mount Lemmon Survey	·	730 m	MPC · JPL
851047	2007 TB_{286}	—	October 9, 2007	Mount Lemmon	Mount Lemmon Survey	NYS	730 m	MPC · JPL
851048	2007 TM_{286}	—	June 21, 2007	Kitt Peak	Spacewatch	·	550 m	MPC · JPL
851049	2007 TQ_{293}	—	September 14, 2007	Mount Lemmon	Mount Lemmon Survey	3:2 · SHU	3.1 km	MPC · JPL
851050	2007 TJ_{295}	—	October 10, 2007	Mount Lemmon	Mount Lemmon Survey	·	2.0 km	MPC · JPL
851051	2007 TD_{296}	—	October 10, 2007	Mount Lemmon	Mount Lemmon Survey	·	1.6 km	MPC · JPL
851052	2007 TS_{297}	—	September 13, 2007	Mount Lemmon	Mount Lemmon Survey	·	1.2 km	MPC · JPL
851053	2007 TL_{299}	—	October 4, 2007	Kitt Peak	Spacewatch	NYS	550 m	MPC · JPL
851054	2007 TD_{300}	—	October 12, 2007	Kitt Peak	Spacewatch	NYS	690 m	MPC · JPL
851055	2007 TB_{301}	—	October 12, 2007	Kitt Peak	Spacewatch	·	1.4 km	MPC · JPL
851056	2007 TC_{301}	—	October 4, 2007	Kitt Peak	Spacewatch	·	920 m	MPC · JPL
851057	2007 TD_{303}	—	October 12, 2007	Kitt Peak	Spacewatch	·	730 m	MPC · JPL
851058	2007 TG_{304}	—	October 12, 2007	Mount Lemmon	Mount Lemmon Survey	·	1.5 km	MPC · JPL
851059	2007 TE_{307}	—	September 13, 2007	Mount Lemmon	Mount Lemmon Survey	·	2.2 km	MPC · JPL
851060	2007 TQ_{309}	—	October 10, 2007	Mount Lemmon	Mount Lemmon Survey	·	560 m	MPC · JPL
851061	2007 TU_{315}	—	October 7, 2007	Mount Lemmon	Mount Lemmon Survey	·	1 km	MPC · JPL
851062	2007 TW_{315}	—	September 12, 2007	Mount Lemmon	Mount Lemmon Survey	·	650 m	MPC · JPL
851063	2007 TB_{321}	—	September 12, 2007	Mount Lemmon	Mount Lemmon Survey	·	400 m	MPC · JPL
851064	2007 TN_{321}	—	October 15, 2007	Kitt Peak	Spacewatch	·	1.4 km	MPC · JPL
851065	2007 TT_{321}	—	October 15, 2007	Kitt Peak	Spacewatch	·	1.0 km	MPC · JPL
851066	2007 TY_{321}	—	October 11, 2007	Mount Lemmon	Mount Lemmon Survey	MAS	490 m	MPC · JPL
851067	2007 TJ_{324}	—	October 11, 2007	Kitt Peak	Spacewatch	·	2.2 km	MPC · JPL
851068	2007 TO_{324}	—	October 11, 2007	Kitt Peak	Spacewatch	ADE	1.3 km	MPC · JPL
851069	2007 TC_{327}	—	October 11, 2007	Kitt Peak	Spacewatch	·	450 m	MPC · JPL
851070	2007 TC_{328}	—	October 11, 2007	Kitt Peak	Spacewatch	·	1.6 km	MPC · JPL
851071	2007 TZ_{329}	—	October 11, 2007	Kitt Peak	Spacewatch	·	1.3 km	MPC · JPL
851072	2007 TQ_{330}	—	October 11, 2007	Kitt Peak	Spacewatch	AGN	840 m	MPC · JPL
851073	2007 TA_{335}	—	October 11, 2007	Kitt Peak	Spacewatch	·	760 m	MPC · JPL
851074	2007 TA_{336}	—	September 30, 2007	Kitt Peak	Spacewatch	·	1.1 km	MPC · JPL
851075	2007 TG_{336}	—	September 14, 2007	Mount Lemmon	Mount Lemmon Survey	·	1.2 km	MPC · JPL
851076	2007 TQ_{338}	—	July 18, 2007	Mount Lemmon	Mount Lemmon Survey	·	1.6 km	MPC · JPL
851077	2007 TZ_{339}	—	September 12, 2007	Kitt Peak	Spacewatch	·	620 m	MPC · JPL
851078	2007 TB_{340}	—	September 12, 2007	Kitt Peak	Spacewatch	LIX	2.3 km	MPC · JPL
851079	2007 TZ_{341}	—	October 9, 2007	Mount Lemmon	Mount Lemmon Survey	·	480 m	MPC · JPL
851080	2007 TM_{343}	—	October 10, 2007	Mount Lemmon	Mount Lemmon Survey	·	1.7 km	MPC · JPL
851081	2007 TU_{344}	—	September 13, 2007	Mount Lemmon	Mount Lemmon Survey	·	870 m	MPC · JPL
851082	2007 TT_{359}	—	September 10, 2007	Mount Lemmon	Mount Lemmon Survey	·	1.7 km	MPC · JPL
851083	2007 TC_{361}	—	October 15, 2007	Mount Lemmon	Mount Lemmon Survey	EMA	2.2 km	MPC · JPL
851084	2007 TZ_{361}	—	October 15, 2007	Mount Lemmon	Mount Lemmon Survey	·	1.2 km	MPC · JPL
851085	2007 TA_{363}	—	October 15, 2007	Mount Lemmon	Mount Lemmon Survey	·	1.1 km	MPC · JPL
851086	2007 TM_{367}	—	October 10, 2007	Catalina	CSS	·	1.1 km	MPC · JPL
851087	2007 TR_{370}	—	October 12, 2007	Mount Lemmon	Mount Lemmon Survey	V	500 m	MPC · JPL
851088	2007 TG_{372}	—	September 14, 2007	Kitt Peak	Spacewatch	·	1.3 km	MPC · JPL
851089	2007 TH_{372}	—	October 13, 2007	Mount Lemmon	Mount Lemmon Survey	BRG	930 m	MPC · JPL
851090	2007 TN_{393}	—	October 13, 2007	Mount Lemmon	Mount Lemmon Survey	·	1.4 km	MPC · JPL
851091	2007 TO_{401}	—	October 4, 2007	Kitt Peak	Spacewatch	·	840 m	MPC · JPL
851092	2007 TP_{403}	—	October 15, 2007	Kitt Peak	Spacewatch	PHO	560 m	MPC · JPL
851093	2007 TH_{405}	—	October 15, 2007	Kitt Peak	Spacewatch	AEO	850 m	MPC · JPL
851094	2007 TK_{405}	—	October 15, 2007	Kitt Peak	Spacewatch	·	1.3 km	MPC · JPL
851095	2007 TP_{407}	—	October 15, 2007	Mount Lemmon	Mount Lemmon Survey	TIN	800 m	MPC · JPL
851096	2007 TY_{407}	—	October 15, 2007	Mount Lemmon	Mount Lemmon Survey	·	890 m	MPC · JPL
851097	2007 TB_{408}	—	October 15, 2007	Mount Lemmon	Mount Lemmon Survey	·	1.1 km	MPC · JPL
851098	2007 TA_{420}	—	September 14, 2007	Catalina	CSS	·	1.5 km	MPC · JPL
851099	2007 TZ_{420}	—	October 11, 2007	Catalina	CSS	·	2.4 km	MPC · JPL
851100	2007 TU_{422}	—	October 12, 2007	Mount Lemmon	Mount Lemmon Survey	·	2.3 km	MPC · JPL

== 851101–851200 ==
back to top

Designation			Discovery			Properties		Ref
Permanent	Provisional	Named after	Date	Site	Discoverer(s)	Category	Diam.	Ref
851101	2007 TY_{423}	—	October 7, 2007	Mount Lemmon	Mount Lemmon Survey	·	670 m	MPC · JPL
851102	2007 TS_{424}	—	September 13, 2007	Mount Lemmon	Mount Lemmon Survey	·	810 m	MPC · JPL
851103	2007 TC_{425}	—	October 8, 2007	Mount Lemmon	Mount Lemmon Survey	·	680 m	MPC · JPL
851104	2007 TZ_{427}	—	October 10, 2007	Kitt Peak	Spacewatch	·	770 m	MPC · JPL
851105	2007 TP_{429}	—	October 12, 2007	Kitt Peak	Spacewatch	·	2.6 km	MPC · JPL
851106	2007 TA_{431}	—	October 8, 2007	Kitt Peak	Spacewatch	3:2	3.1 km	MPC · JPL
851107	2007 TG_{434}	—	October 8, 2007	Catalina	CSS	·	2.5 km	MPC · JPL
851108	2007 TN_{439}	—	October 4, 2007	Kitt Peak	Spacewatch	·	2.1 km	MPC · JPL
851109	2007 TU_{439}	—	October 9, 2007	Mount Lemmon	Mount Lemmon Survey	·	740 m	MPC · JPL
851110	2007 TM_{442}	—	October 7, 2007	Catalina	CSS	·	2.1 km	MPC · JPL
851111	2007 TL_{449}	—	October 10, 2007	Kitt Peak	Spacewatch	MAS	490 m	MPC · JPL
851112	2007 TR_{452}	—	October 12, 2007	Mount Lemmon	Mount Lemmon Survey	·	1.1 km	MPC · JPL
851113	2007 TB_{455}	—	October 9, 2007	Mount Lemmon	Mount Lemmon Survey	·	1.2 km	MPC · JPL
851114	2007 TV_{455}	—	October 11, 2007	Kitt Peak	Spacewatch	·	1.4 km	MPC · JPL
851115	2007 TX_{456}	—	October 8, 2007	Mount Lemmon	Mount Lemmon Survey	·	650 m	MPC · JPL
851116	2007 TY_{456}	—	October 8, 2007	Mount Lemmon	Mount Lemmon Survey	·	630 m	MPC · JPL
851117	2007 TE_{457}	—	October 8, 2007	Mount Lemmon	Mount Lemmon Survey	·	1.3 km	MPC · JPL
851118	2007 TL_{459}	—	October 15, 2007	Mount Lemmon	Mount Lemmon Survey	·	1.4 km	MPC · JPL
851119	2007 TY_{461}	—	October 23, 2012	Mount Lemmon	Mount Lemmon Survey	EOS	1.1 km	MPC · JPL
851120	2007 TG_{462}	—	October 10, 2007	Kitt Peak	Spacewatch	·	650 m	MPC · JPL
851121	2007 TD_{463}	—	October 11, 2007	Kitt Peak	Spacewatch	·	1.4 km	MPC · JPL
851122	2007 TF_{463}	—	October 15, 2007	Mount Lemmon	Mount Lemmon Survey	·	1.5 km	MPC · JPL
851123	2007 TH_{464}	—	April 11, 2010	Kitt Peak	Spacewatch	·	1.6 km	MPC · JPL
851124	2007 TJ_{464}	—	October 10, 2007	Kitt Peak	Spacewatch	T_{j} (2.97) · 3:2	3.5 km	MPC · JPL
851125	2007 TK_{464}	—	September 24, 2007	Kitt Peak	Spacewatch	·	2.0 km	MPC · JPL
851126	2007 TW_{464}	—	October 15, 2007	Kitt Peak	Spacewatch	·	390 m	MPC · JPL
851127	2007 TZ_{464}	—	October 10, 2007	Kitt Peak	Spacewatch	NEM	1.6 km	MPC · JPL
851128	2007 TF_{465}	—	April 12, 2013	Haleakala	Pan-STARRS 1	·	460 m	MPC · JPL
851129	2007 TK_{465}	—	October 7, 2012	Haleakala	Pan-STARRS 1	H	340 m	MPC · JPL
851130	2007 TV_{466}	—	October 10, 2007	Mount Lemmon	Mount Lemmon Survey	NYS	820 m	MPC · JPL
851131	2007 TJ_{467}	—	October 8, 2007	Catalina	CSS	·	1.9 km	MPC · JPL
851132	2007 TG_{468}	—	October 11, 2007	Kitt Peak	Spacewatch	·	780 m	MPC · JPL
851133	2007 TN_{469}	—	July 28, 2014	Haleakala	Pan-STARRS 1	·	790 m	MPC · JPL
851134	2007 TR_{469}	—	October 11, 2007	Kitt Peak	Spacewatch	·	910 m	MPC · JPL
851135	2007 TK_{470}	—	October 24, 2011	Haleakala	Pan-STARRS 1	·	720 m	MPC · JPL
851136	2007 TQ_{470}	—	August 17, 2012	Haleakala	Pan-STARRS 1	·	1.7 km	MPC · JPL
851137	2007 TC_{471}	—	December 1, 2015	Haleakala	Pan-STARRS 1	·	1.0 km	MPC · JPL
851138	2007 TK_{471}	—	October 7, 2007	Mount Lemmon	Mount Lemmon Survey	MAS	580 m	MPC · JPL
851139	2007 TM_{471}	—	April 5, 2014	Haleakala	Pan-STARRS 1	·	1.6 km	MPC · JPL
851140	2007 TY_{471}	—	October 14, 2007	Mount Lemmon	Mount Lemmon Survey	V	440 m	MPC · JPL
851141	2007 TM_{472}	—	October 10, 2007	Kitt Peak	Spacewatch	·	440 m	MPC · JPL
851142	2007 TF_{473}	—	October 9, 2007	Mount Lemmon	Mount Lemmon Survey	PHO	540 m	MPC · JPL
851143	2007 TR_{473}	—	October 12, 2007	Anderson Mesa	LONEOS	·	1.2 km	MPC · JPL
851144	2007 TT_{473}	—	October 15, 2007	Mount Lemmon	Mount Lemmon Survey	·	860 m	MPC · JPL
851145	2007 TJ_{475}	—	October 10, 2007	Mount Lemmon	Mount Lemmon Survey	·	1.3 km	MPC · JPL
851146	2007 TR_{475}	—	October 12, 2007	Mount Lemmon	Mount Lemmon Survey	·	1.4 km	MPC · JPL
851147	2007 TU_{475}	—	October 11, 2007	Anderson Mesa	Wasserman, L. H.	·	1.4 km	MPC · JPL
851148	2007 TY_{475}	—	October 6, 2016	Haleakala	Pan-STARRS 1	·	1.3 km	MPC · JPL
851149	2007 TB_{476}	—	October 9, 2007	Kitt Peak	Spacewatch	·	420 m	MPC · JPL
851150	2007 TH_{476}	—	October 8, 2007	Kitt Peak	Spacewatch	·	2.7 km	MPC · JPL
851151	2007 TQ_{476}	—	September 6, 2013	Mount Lemmon	Mount Lemmon Survey	·	1.9 km	MPC · JPL
851152	2007 TV_{476}	—	October 12, 2007	Mount Lemmon	Mount Lemmon Survey	AGN	880 m	MPC · JPL
851153	2007 TJ_{477}	—	October 8, 2007	Catalina	CSS	·	900 m	MPC · JPL
851154	2007 TY_{477}	—	March 18, 2010	Kitt Peak	Spacewatch	EOS	1.2 km	MPC · JPL
851155	2007 TM_{478}	—	December 27, 2011	Kitt Peak	Spacewatch	·	700 m	MPC · JPL
851156	2007 TO_{478}	—	February 17, 2015	Haleakala	Pan-STARRS 1	·	1.9 km	MPC · JPL
851157	2007 TE_{479}	—	January 15, 2015	Haleakala	Pan-STARRS 1	·	2.2 km	MPC · JPL
851158	2007 TQ_{482}	—	October 7, 2007	Mount Lemmon	Mount Lemmon Survey	THM	1.7 km	MPC · JPL
851159	2007 TR_{482}	—	October 7, 2007	Mount Lemmon	Mount Lemmon Survey	·	1.3 km	MPC · JPL
851160	2007 TV_{482}	—	October 10, 2007	Mount Lemmon	Mount Lemmon Survey	·	820 m	MPC · JPL
851161	2007 TG_{483}	—	October 12, 2007	Kitt Peak	Spacewatch	·	1.3 km	MPC · JPL
851162	2007 TR_{483}	—	October 10, 2007	Mount Lemmon	Mount Lemmon Survey	AGN	860 m	MPC · JPL
851163	2007 TC_{484}	—	October 8, 2007	Mount Lemmon	Mount Lemmon Survey	T_{j} (2.93) · 3:2	3.6 km	MPC · JPL
851164	2007 TE_{484}	—	August 13, 2002	Kitt Peak	Spacewatch	AEO	860 m	MPC · JPL
851165	2007 TW_{486}	—	October 12, 2007	Mount Lemmon	Mount Lemmon Survey	·	1.3 km	MPC · JPL
851166	2007 TJ_{488}	—	October 13, 2007	Kitt Peak	Spacewatch	·	1.3 km	MPC · JPL
851167	2007 TR_{490}	—	October 4, 2007	Mount Lemmon	Mount Lemmon Survey	·	1.1 km	MPC · JPL
851168	2007 TA_{491}	—	October 10, 2007	Kitt Peak	Spacewatch	·	2.0 km	MPC · JPL
851169	2007 TB_{491}	—	October 12, 2007	Kitt Peak	Spacewatch	MIS	1.7 km	MPC · JPL
851170	2007 TL_{491}	—	October 13, 2007	Mount Lemmon	Mount Lemmon Survey	·	1.0 km	MPC · JPL
851171	2007 TN_{491}	—	October 10, 2007	Catalina	CSS	ADE	1.2 km	MPC · JPL
851172	2007 TP_{491}	—	October 9, 2007	Mount Lemmon	Mount Lemmon Survey	·	1.1 km	MPC · JPL
851173	2007 TR_{491}	—	October 14, 2007	Mount Lemmon	Mount Lemmon Survey	·	1.1 km	MPC · JPL
851174	2007 TZ_{491}	—	October 9, 2007	Mount Lemmon	Mount Lemmon Survey	·	960 m	MPC · JPL
851175	2007 TN_{492}	—	October 5, 2007	Kitt Peak	Spacewatch	·	920 m	MPC · JPL
851176	2007 TX_{493}	—	October 8, 2007	Mount Lemmon	Mount Lemmon Survey	AEO	820 m	MPC · JPL
851177	2007 TZ_{493}	—	October 12, 2007	Kitt Peak	Spacewatch	·	1.4 km	MPC · JPL
851178	2007 TQ_{495}	—	October 8, 2007	Mount Lemmon	Mount Lemmon Survey	·	1.2 km	MPC · JPL
851179	2007 TU_{495}	—	October 15, 2007	Kitt Peak	Spacewatch	·	2.2 km	MPC · JPL
851180	2007 TY_{495}	—	October 10, 2007	Mount Lemmon	Mount Lemmon Survey	·	820 m	MPC · JPL
851181	2007 TJ_{496}	—	October 10, 2007	Kitt Peak	Spacewatch	·	580 m	MPC · JPL
851182	2007 TB_{497}	—	October 11, 2007	Mount Lemmon	Mount Lemmon Survey	·	2.2 km	MPC · JPL
851183	2007 TP_{497}	—	October 9, 2007	Kitt Peak	Spacewatch	·	1.1 km	MPC · JPL
851184	2007 TN_{498}	—	October 10, 2007	Mount Lemmon	Mount Lemmon Survey	·	2.4 km	MPC · JPL
851185	2007 TO_{499}	—	October 9, 2007	Mount Lemmon	Mount Lemmon Survey	NYS	850 m	MPC · JPL
851186	2007 TR_{500}	—	October 11, 2007	Kitt Peak	Spacewatch	·	1.8 km	MPC · JPL
851187	2007 TG_{502}	—	October 12, 2007	Kitt Peak	Spacewatch	HOF	1.7 km	MPC · JPL
851188	2007 TP_{502}	—	October 4, 2007	Mount Lemmon	Mount Lemmon Survey	·	1.6 km	MPC · JPL
851189	2007 TN_{503}	—	October 12, 2007	Mount Lemmon	Mount Lemmon Survey	·	1.4 km	MPC · JPL
851190	2007 TD_{504}	—	October 9, 2007	Kitt Peak	Spacewatch	·	1.1 km	MPC · JPL
851191	2007 TY_{505}	—	October 12, 2007	Kitt Peak	Spacewatch	·	1.3 km	MPC · JPL
851192	2007 TD_{508}	—	October 8, 2007	Mount Lemmon	Mount Lemmon Survey	·	2.1 km	MPC · JPL
851193	2007 TK_{510}	—	October 7, 2007	Mount Lemmon	Mount Lemmon Survey	·	1.2 km	MPC · JPL
851194	2007 TL_{510}	—	October 10, 2007	Mount Lemmon	Mount Lemmon Survey	·	1.3 km	MPC · JPL
851195	2007 TO_{510}	—	October 15, 2007	Kitt Peak	Spacewatch	·	2.5 km	MPC · JPL
851196	2007 TQ_{510}	—	October 12, 2007	Mount Lemmon	Mount Lemmon Survey	·	2.3 km	MPC · JPL
851197	2007 UF_{1}	—	October 9, 2007	Kitt Peak	Spacewatch	·	850 m	MPC · JPL
851198	2007 UN_{6}	—	October 21, 2007	Punaʻauia	N. Teamo, J. C. Pelle	·	880 m	MPC · JPL
851199	2007 UC_{16}	—	October 18, 2007	Mount Lemmon	Mount Lemmon Survey	MAR	700 m	MPC · JPL
851200	2007 UJ_{19}	—	October 7, 2007	Mount Lemmon	Mount Lemmon Survey	·	1.9 km	MPC · JPL

== 851201–851300 ==
back to top

Designation			Discovery			Properties		Ref
Permanent	Provisional	Named after	Date	Site	Discoverer(s)	Category	Diam.	Ref
851201	2007 UG_{21}	—	October 4, 2007	Kitt Peak	Spacewatch	NYS	710 m	MPC · JPL
851202	2007 UW_{23}	—	October 8, 2007	Mount Lemmon	Mount Lemmon Survey	·	610 m	MPC · JPL
851203	2007 UA_{27}	—	October 16, 2007	Mount Lemmon	Mount Lemmon Survey	V	420 m	MPC · JPL
851204	2007 UZ_{41}	—	October 16, 2007	Mount Lemmon	Mount Lemmon Survey	·	1.3 km	MPC · JPL
851205	2007 UF_{43}	—	October 7, 2007	Mount Lemmon	Mount Lemmon Survey	·	850 m	MPC · JPL
851206	2007 UV_{43}	—	September 14, 2007	Mount Lemmon	Mount Lemmon Survey	MAS	490 m	MPC · JPL
851207	2007 UZ_{44}	—	September 25, 2007	Mount Lemmon	Mount Lemmon Survey	·	730 m	MPC · JPL
851208	2007 UB_{45}	—	October 4, 2007	Kitt Peak	Spacewatch	EUN	770 m	MPC · JPL
851209	2007 US_{47}	—	October 19, 2007	Kitt Peak	Spacewatch	·	1.7 km	MPC · JPL
851210	2007 UG_{54}	—	October 10, 2007	Kitt Peak	Spacewatch	DOR	1.5 km	MPC · JPL
851211	2007 UY_{56}	—	October 30, 2007	Mount Lemmon	Mount Lemmon Survey	·	470 m	MPC · JPL
851212	2007 UY_{58}	—	October 7, 2007	Mount Lemmon	Mount Lemmon Survey	·	1.0 km	MPC · JPL
851213	2007 UM_{67}	—	October 9, 2007	Mount Lemmon	Mount Lemmon Survey	WAT	1.1 km	MPC · JPL
851214	2007 UV_{69}	—	October 10, 2007	Kitt Peak	Spacewatch	·	2.3 km	MPC · JPL
851215	2007 UF_{73}	—	October 10, 2007	Kitt Peak	Spacewatch	·	1.3 km	MPC · JPL
851216	2007 UD_{74}	—	October 18, 2007	Kitt Peak	Spacewatch	·	670 m	MPC · JPL
851217	2007 UW_{78}	—	October 30, 2007	Mount Lemmon	Mount Lemmon Survey	·	1.2 km	MPC · JPL
851218	2007 UE_{80}	—	October 31, 2007	Mount Lemmon	Mount Lemmon Survey	·	1.1 km	MPC · JPL
851219	2007 UO_{81}	—	October 19, 2007	Mount Lemmon	Mount Lemmon Survey	·	1.2 km	MPC · JPL
851220	2007 UT_{82}	—	October 20, 2007	Bergisch Gladbach	W. Bickel	·	1.2 km	MPC · JPL
851221	2007 UE_{83}	—	October 19, 2007	Kitt Peak	Spacewatch	·	1.5 km	MPC · JPL
851222	2007 UD_{86}	—	October 30, 2007	Kitt Peak	Spacewatch	·	2.5 km	MPC · JPL
851223	2007 UO_{89}	—	December 19, 2004	Mount Lemmon	Mount Lemmon Survey	·	380 m	MPC · JPL
851224	2007 UF_{92}	—	October 8, 2007	Kitt Peak	Spacewatch	·	1.9 km	MPC · JPL
851225	2007 UK_{96}	—	October 17, 2007	Mount Lemmon	Mount Lemmon Survey	(1298)	1.9 km	MPC · JPL
851226	2007 US_{102}	—	October 30, 2007	Mount Lemmon	Mount Lemmon Survey	·	1.7 km	MPC · JPL
851227	2007 UB_{107}	—	October 31, 2007	Mount Lemmon	Mount Lemmon Survey	·	1.1 km	MPC · JPL
851228	2007 UP_{109}	—	October 30, 2007	Mount Lemmon	Mount Lemmon Survey	·	1.2 km	MPC · JPL
851229	2007 UQ_{111}	—	October 7, 2007	Mount Lemmon	Mount Lemmon Survey	·	420 m	MPC · JPL
851230	2007 UK_{112}	—	October 30, 2007	Mount Lemmon	Mount Lemmon Survey	·	870 m	MPC · JPL
851231	2007 UE_{124}	—	September 8, 2007	Mount Lemmon	Mount Lemmon Survey	·	1.2 km	MPC · JPL
851232	2007 UV_{129}	—	October 16, 2007	Mount Lemmon	Mount Lemmon Survey	·	470 m	MPC · JPL
851233	2007 UE_{130}	—	October 18, 2007	Kitt Peak	Spacewatch	·	690 m	MPC · JPL
851234	2007 UR_{130}	—	October 20, 2007	Mount Lemmon	Mount Lemmon Survey	·	820 m	MPC · JPL
851235	2007 UJ_{132}	—	October 19, 2007	Kitt Peak	Spacewatch	H	290 m	MPC · JPL
851236	2007 UO_{134}	—	September 14, 2007	Mount Lemmon	Mount Lemmon Survey	·	450 m	MPC · JPL
851237	2007 UH_{135}	—	August 30, 2002	Kitt Peak	Spacewatch	·	1.1 km	MPC · JPL
851238	2007 UA_{137}	—	October 31, 2007	Mount Lemmon	Mount Lemmon Survey	·	890 m	MPC · JPL
851239	2007 UG_{138}	—	October 19, 2007	Catalina	CSS	·	1.1 km	MPC · JPL
851240	2007 UH_{138}	—	October 19, 2007	Catalina	CSS	JUN	860 m	MPC · JPL
851241	2007 UX_{141}	—	October 24, 2007	Mount Lemmon	Mount Lemmon Survey	·	1.9 km	MPC · JPL
851242	2007 UU_{144}	—	October 20, 2007	Mount Lemmon	Mount Lemmon Survey	·	590 m	MPC · JPL
851243	2007 UB_{145}	—	October 21, 2007	Mount Lemmon	Mount Lemmon Survey	·	820 m	MPC · JPL
851244	2007 UC_{145}	—	October 21, 2007	Mount Lemmon	Mount Lemmon Survey	·	790 m	MPC · JPL
851245	2007 UQ_{146}	—	October 20, 2007	Mount Lemmon	Mount Lemmon Survey	·	1.5 km	MPC · JPL
851246	2007 UT_{146}	—	December 6, 2011	Haleakala	Pan-STARRS 1	·	880 m	MPC · JPL
851247	2007 UX_{146}	—	June 13, 2010	Mount Lemmon	Mount Lemmon Survey	·	490 m	MPC · JPL
851248	2007 UZ_{146}	—	January 9, 2016	Haleakala	Pan-STARRS 1	·	930 m	MPC · JPL
851249	2007 UL_{147}	—	October 16, 2007	Mount Lemmon	Mount Lemmon Survey	T_{j} (2.9)	3.7 km	MPC · JPL
851250	2007 UY_{149}	—	June 24, 2014	Haleakala	Pan-STARRS 1	·	890 m	MPC · JPL
851251	2007 US_{150}	—	October 20, 2007	Mount Lemmon	Mount Lemmon Survey	·	660 m	MPC · JPL
851252	2007 UY_{150}	—	July 28, 2014	Haleakala	Pan-STARRS 1	·	670 m	MPC · JPL
851253	2007 UK_{151}	—	September 25, 2012	Mount Lemmon	Mount Lemmon Survey	·	1.9 km	MPC · JPL
851254	2007 UQ_{151}	—	October 16, 2007	Mount Lemmon	Mount Lemmon Survey	·	2.1 km	MPC · JPL
851255	2007 UT_{152}	—	February 22, 2009	Kitt Peak	Spacewatch	·	440 m	MPC · JPL
851256	2007 UA_{153}	—	October 20, 2007	Mount Lemmon	Mount Lemmon Survey	·	830 m	MPC · JPL
851257	2007 UQ_{153}	—	April 22, 2013	Mount Lemmon	Mount Lemmon Survey	·	530 m	MPC · JPL
851258	2007 UA_{156}	—	October 17, 2007	Mount Lemmon	Mount Lemmon Survey	·	860 m	MPC · JPL
851259	2007 UK_{156}	—	October 16, 2007	Mount Lemmon	Mount Lemmon Survey	·	1.5 km	MPC · JPL
851260	2007 UU_{156}	—	October 19, 2007	Kitt Peak	Spacewatch	·	1.2 km	MPC · JPL
851261	2007 UZ_{156}	—	October 20, 2007	Mount Lemmon	Mount Lemmon Survey	·	1.4 km	MPC · JPL
851262	2007 UB_{157}	—	October 16, 2007	Mount Lemmon	Mount Lemmon Survey	AEO	710 m	MPC · JPL
851263	2007 UT_{157}	—	October 16, 2007	Mount Lemmon	Mount Lemmon Survey	·	1.2 km	MPC · JPL
851264	2007 UC_{158}	—	October 16, 2007	Mount Lemmon	Mount Lemmon Survey	·	1.1 km	MPC · JPL
851265	2007 UJ_{159}	—	October 18, 2007	Kitt Peak	Spacewatch	·	800 m	MPC · JPL
851266	2007 UU_{159}	—	October 20, 2007	Mount Lemmon	Mount Lemmon Survey	·	1.1 km	MPC · JPL
851267	2007 UJ_{161}	—	October 20, 2007	Mount Lemmon	Mount Lemmon Survey	·	1.7 km	MPC · JPL
851268	2007 UU_{161}	—	October 16, 2007	Kitt Peak	Spacewatch	·	860 m	MPC · JPL
851269	2007 UW_{161}	—	October 18, 2007	Mount Lemmon	Mount Lemmon Survey	·	840 m	MPC · JPL
851270	2007 UY_{162}	—	October 17, 2007	Mount Lemmon	Mount Lemmon Survey	·	680 m	MPC · JPL
851271	2007 UX_{163}	—	October 20, 2007	Mount Lemmon	Mount Lemmon Survey	PHO	640 m	MPC · JPL
851272	2007 UC_{164}	—	October 20, 2007	Kitt Peak	Spacewatch	·	420 m	MPC · JPL
851273	2007 UL_{164}	—	October 21, 2007	Kitt Peak	Spacewatch	V	390 m	MPC · JPL
851274	2007 UB_{166}	—	October 31, 2007	Mount Lemmon	Mount Lemmon Survey	·	490 m	MPC · JPL
851275	2007 UM_{166}	—	October 30, 2007	Mount Lemmon	Mount Lemmon Survey	·	1.8 km	MPC · JPL
851276	2007 VL	—	November 1, 2007	Mount Lemmon	Mount Lemmon Survey	AGN	870 m	MPC · JPL
851277	2007 VN_{12}	—	October 21, 2007	Catalina	CSS	JUN	850 m	MPC · JPL
851278	2007 VS_{12}	—	October 9, 2007	Kitt Peak	Spacewatch	·	2.1 km	MPC · JPL
851279	2007 VX_{12}	—	October 21, 2000	Kitt Peak	Spacewatch	·	500 m	MPC · JPL
851280	2007 VT_{13}	—	November 1, 2007	Mount Lemmon	Mount Lemmon Survey	·	700 m	MPC · JPL
851281	2007 VL_{15}	—	November 1, 2007	Kitt Peak	Spacewatch	·	640 m	MPC · JPL
851282	2007 VW_{15}	—	October 18, 2007	Kitt Peak	Spacewatch	·	2.2 km	MPC · JPL
851283	2007 VZ_{17}	—	November 1, 2007	Mount Lemmon	Mount Lemmon Survey	MAS	510 m	MPC · JPL
851284	2007 VK_{18}	—	November 1, 2007	Mount Lemmon	Mount Lemmon Survey	·	750 m	MPC · JPL
851285	2007 VE_{21}	—	September 9, 2007	Mount Lemmon	Mount Lemmon Survey	·	670 m	MPC · JPL
851286	2007 VO_{22}	—	October 12, 2007	Mount Lemmon	Mount Lemmon Survey	PHO	620 m	MPC · JPL
851287	2007 VZ_{24}	—	November 2, 2007	Mount Lemmon	Mount Lemmon Survey	·	1.3 km	MPC · JPL
851288	2007 VG_{29}	—	November 3, 2007	Mount Lemmon	Mount Lemmon Survey	KOR	1.1 km	MPC · JPL
851289	2007 VN_{29}	—	October 19, 2007	Kitt Peak	Spacewatch	·	1.2 km	MPC · JPL
851290	2007 VD_{31}	—	November 2, 2007	Kitt Peak	Spacewatch	H	310 m	MPC · JPL
851291	2007 VG_{34}	—	November 3, 2007	Kitt Peak	Spacewatch	·	430 m	MPC · JPL
851292	2007 VL_{35}	—	October 7, 2007	Mount Lemmon	Mount Lemmon Survey	·	740 m	MPC · JPL
851293	2007 VM_{35}	—	October 10, 2007	Kitt Peak	Spacewatch	·	810 m	MPC · JPL
851294	2007 VG_{38}	—	October 8, 2007	Mount Lemmon	Mount Lemmon Survey	NYS	590 m	MPC · JPL
851295	2007 VH_{38}	—	November 2, 2007	Mount Lemmon	Mount Lemmon Survey	·	480 m	MPC · JPL
851296	2007 VW_{45}	—	November 1, 2007	Kitt Peak	Spacewatch	·	1.4 km	MPC · JPL
851297	2007 VN_{49}	—	November 1, 2007	Kitt Peak	Spacewatch	·	710 m	MPC · JPL
851298	2007 VH_{53}	—	November 1, 2007	Kitt Peak	Spacewatch	NYS	840 m	MPC · JPL
851299	2007 VY_{55}	—	November 1, 2007	Kitt Peak	Spacewatch	HOF	2.0 km	MPC · JPL
851300	2007 VN_{57}	—	October 20, 2007	Mount Lemmon	Mount Lemmon Survey	·	830 m	MPC · JPL

== 851301–851400 ==
back to top

Designation			Discovery			Properties		Ref
Permanent	Provisional	Named after	Date	Site	Discoverer(s)	Category	Diam.	Ref
851301	2007 VF_{62}	—	October 16, 2007	Mount Lemmon	Mount Lemmon Survey	·	1.4 km	MPC · JPL
851302	2007 VJ_{63}	—	October 14, 2007	Mount Lemmon	Mount Lemmon Survey	DOR	1.6 km	MPC · JPL
851303	2007 VO_{67}	—	October 12, 2007	Mount Lemmon	Mount Lemmon Survey	·	1.1 km	MPC · JPL
851304	2007 VB_{71}	—	November 4, 2007	Mount Lemmon	Mount Lemmon Survey	·	700 m	MPC · JPL
851305	2007 VF_{71}	—	November 4, 2007	Mount Lemmon	Mount Lemmon Survey	·	810 m	MPC · JPL
851306	2007 VW_{71}	—	October 12, 2007	Anderson Mesa	LONEOS	·	730 m	MPC · JPL
851307	2007 VX_{78}	—	November 3, 2007	Kitt Peak	Spacewatch	AEO	720 m	MPC · JPL
851308	2007 VL_{79}	—	October 20, 2007	Kitt Peak	Spacewatch	(1547)	960 m	MPC · JPL
851309	2007 VB_{83}	—	November 4, 2007	Mount Lemmon	Mount Lemmon Survey	·	1.1 km	MPC · JPL
851310	2007 VW_{85}	—	October 7, 2007	Kitt Peak	Spacewatch	·	2.2 km	MPC · JPL
851311	2007 VE_{86}	—	October 23, 2007	Kitt Peak	Spacewatch	·	740 m	MPC · JPL
851312	2007 VD_{91}	—	November 7, 2007	Socorro	LINEAR	·	730 m	MPC · JPL
851313	2007 VS_{95}	—	October 11, 2007	Kitt Peak	Spacewatch	·	1.1 km	MPC · JPL
851314	2007 VZ_{100}	—	November 2, 2007	Kitt Peak	Spacewatch	·	820 m	MPC · JPL
851315	2007 VX_{105}	—	November 3, 2007	Kitt Peak	Spacewatch	·	870 m	MPC · JPL
851316	2007 VM_{106}	—	October 9, 2007	Mount Lemmon	Mount Lemmon Survey	·	1.6 km	MPC · JPL
851317	2007 VL_{108}	—	October 17, 2007	Mount Lemmon	Mount Lemmon Survey	·	1.4 km	MPC · JPL
851318	2007 VQ_{109}	—	September 14, 2007	Mount Lemmon	Mount Lemmon Survey	·	730 m	MPC · JPL
851319	2007 VY_{127}	—	September 11, 2007	Mount Lemmon	Mount Lemmon Survey	·	430 m	MPC · JPL
851320	2007 VO_{128}	—	November 1, 2007	Mount Lemmon	Mount Lemmon Survey	HNS	750 m	MPC · JPL
851321	2007 VT_{128}	—	October 12, 2007	Kitt Peak	Spacewatch	·	1.2 km	MPC · JPL
851322	2007 VU_{128}	—	October 10, 2007	Kitt Peak	Spacewatch	·	1.6 km	MPC · JPL
851323	2007 VF_{130}	—	November 1, 2007	Mount Lemmon	Mount Lemmon Survey	MAS	500 m	MPC · JPL
851324	2007 VY_{130}	—	November 1, 2007	Mount Lemmon	Mount Lemmon Survey	·	1.2 km	MPC · JPL
851325	2007 VF_{132}	—	February 10, 2004	Palomar	NEAT	·	1.1 km	MPC · JPL
851326	2007 VK_{134}	—	November 3, 2007	Kitt Peak	Spacewatch	·	1.2 km	MPC · JPL
851327	2007 VB_{135}	—	November 3, 2007	Kitt Peak	Spacewatch	·	940 m	MPC · JPL
851328	2007 VF_{136}	—	October 10, 2007	Mount Lemmon	Mount Lemmon Survey	·	600 m	MPC · JPL
851329	2007 VZ_{136}	—	November 5, 2007	Mount Lemmon	Mount Lemmon Survey	·	790 m	MPC · JPL
851330	2007 VU_{142}	—	November 4, 2007	Kitt Peak	Spacewatch	T_{j} (2.99) · 3:2	3.9 km	MPC · JPL
851331	2007 VV_{149}	—	November 7, 2007	Mount Lemmon	Mount Lemmon Survey	V	470 m	MPC · JPL
851332	2007 VA_{154}	—	November 4, 2007	Kitt Peak	Spacewatch	·	1.5 km	MPC · JPL
851333	2007 VV_{160}	—	November 5, 2007	Kitt Peak	Spacewatch	·	1.4 km	MPC · JPL
851334	2007 VZ_{160}	—	November 5, 2007	Kitt Peak	Spacewatch	·	2.1 km	MPC · JPL
851335	2007 VW_{161}	—	November 5, 2007	Kitt Peak	Spacewatch	NYS	830 m	MPC · JPL
851336	2007 VS_{162}	—	November 5, 2007	Kitt Peak	Spacewatch	·	1.7 km	MPC · JPL
851337	2007 VZ_{162}	—	November 5, 2007	Kitt Peak	Spacewatch	·	960 m	MPC · JPL
851338	2007 VA_{163}	—	November 1, 2007	Kitt Peak	Spacewatch	·	2.3 km	MPC · JPL
851339	2007 VR_{165}	—	November 5, 2007	Kitt Peak	Spacewatch	·	1.2 km	MPC · JPL
851340	2007 VP_{171}	—	November 7, 2007	Kitt Peak	Spacewatch	·	2.1 km	MPC · JPL
851341	2007 VT_{171}	—	November 7, 2007	Kitt Peak	Spacewatch	·	1.3 km	MPC · JPL
851342	2007 VZ_{176}	—	November 5, 2007	Mount Lemmon	Mount Lemmon Survey	·	2.0 km	MPC · JPL
851343	2007 VZ_{181}	—	November 8, 2007	Kitt Peak	Spacewatch	·	860 m	MPC · JPL
851344	2007 VT_{183}	—	November 8, 2007	Mount Lemmon	Mount Lemmon Survey	PHO	820 m	MPC · JPL
851345	2007 VJ_{191}	—	October 19, 2007	Kitt Peak	Spacewatch	·	1.5 km	MPC · JPL
851346	2007 VT_{192}	—	November 4, 2007	Mount Lemmon	Mount Lemmon Survey	·	730 m	MPC · JPL
851347	2007 VM_{195}	—	September 13, 2007	Mount Lemmon	Mount Lemmon Survey	·	960 m	MPC · JPL
851348	2007 VQ_{197}	—	November 8, 2007	Mount Lemmon	Mount Lemmon Survey	·	1.3 km	MPC · JPL
851349	2007 VZ_{198}	—	October 16, 2007	Kitt Peak	Spacewatch	·	1.4 km	MPC · JPL
851350	2007 VZ_{199}	—	November 9, 2007	Mount Lemmon	Mount Lemmon Survey	NYS	700 m	MPC · JPL
851351	2007 VE_{202}	—	November 5, 2007	XuYi	PMO NEO Survey Program	·	2.3 km	MPC · JPL
851352	2007 VX_{202}	—	November 8, 2007	Kitt Peak	Spacewatch	·	750 m	MPC · JPL
851353	2007 VO_{203}	—	September 15, 2007	Mount Lemmon	Mount Lemmon Survey	(2076)	470 m	MPC · JPL
851354	2007 VP_{203}	—	October 8, 2007	Kitt Peak	Spacewatch	·	1.2 km	MPC · JPL
851355	2007 VS_{203}	—	November 1, 2007	Kitt Peak	Spacewatch	·	790 m	MPC · JPL
851356	2007 VG_{211}	—	October 9, 2007	Kitt Peak	Spacewatch	·	1.2 km	MPC · JPL
851357	2007 VZ_{212}	—	November 9, 2007	Kitt Peak	Spacewatch	·	850 m	MPC · JPL
851358	2007 VG_{216}	—	November 9, 2007	Kitt Peak	Spacewatch	·	570 m	MPC · JPL
851359	2007 VU_{216}	—	November 1, 2007	Kitt Peak	Spacewatch	·	790 m	MPC · JPL
851360	2007 VD_{217}	—	November 1, 2007	Kitt Peak	Spacewatch	·	1.2 km	MPC · JPL
851361	2007 VK_{218}	—	November 9, 2007	Kitt Peak	Spacewatch	·	1.2 km	MPC · JPL
851362	2007 VE_{225}	—	October 9, 2007	Mount Lemmon	Mount Lemmon Survey	WIT	810 m	MPC · JPL
851363	2007 VL_{225}	—	September 13, 2007	Mount Lemmon	Mount Lemmon Survey	NYS	720 m	MPC · JPL
851364	2007 VG_{226}	—	November 2, 2007	Mount Lemmon	Mount Lemmon Survey	·	1.0 km	MPC · JPL
851365	2007 VN_{229}	—	October 17, 2007	Mount Lemmon	Mount Lemmon Survey	NEM	1.8 km	MPC · JPL
851366	2007 VO_{238}	—	November 9, 2007	Kitt Peak	Spacewatch	·	1.1 km	MPC · JPL
851367	2007 VY_{239}	—	November 17, 1999	Kitt Peak	Spacewatch	T_{j} (2.98) · 3:2	3.9 km	MPC · JPL
851368	2007 VF_{240}	—	November 7, 2007	Mount Lemmon	Mount Lemmon Survey	·	1.1 km	MPC · JPL
851369	2007 VQ_{240}	—	October 10, 2007	Kitt Peak	Spacewatch	·	1.3 km	MPC · JPL
851370	2007 VK_{247}	—	September 11, 2007	Mount Lemmon	Mount Lemmon Survey	·	1.3 km	MPC · JPL
851371	2007 VX_{247}	—	November 13, 2007	Mount Lemmon	Mount Lemmon Survey	·	1.3 km	MPC · JPL
851372	2007 VR_{248}	—	October 20, 2007	Mount Lemmon	Mount Lemmon Survey	EOS	1.2 km	MPC · JPL
851373	2007 VX_{249}	—	November 14, 2007	Mount Lemmon	Mount Lemmon Survey	·	710 m	MPC · JPL
851374	2007 VS_{260}	—	November 1, 2007	Kitt Peak	Spacewatch	·	700 m	MPC · JPL
851375	2007 VK_{261}	—	November 1, 2007	Kitt Peak	Spacewatch	·	620 m	MPC · JPL
851376	2007 VM_{261}	—	November 5, 2007	Kitt Peak	Spacewatch	·	1.2 km	MPC · JPL
851377	2007 VV_{261}	—	October 18, 2007	Kitt Peak	Spacewatch	·	1.4 km	MPC · JPL
851378	2007 VA_{264}	—	November 13, 2007	Kitt Peak	Spacewatch	·	1.1 km	MPC · JPL
851379	2007 VP_{265}	—	November 13, 2007	Kitt Peak	Spacewatch	·	1.8 km	MPC · JPL
851380	2007 VX_{267}	—	November 9, 2007	Socorro	LINEAR	PHO	1.2 km	MPC · JPL
851381	2007 VK_{274}	—	November 5, 2007	Kitt Peak	Spacewatch	PHO	750 m	MPC · JPL
851382	2007 VV_{274}	—	May 13, 2015	Mount Lemmon	Mount Lemmon Survey	·	1.3 km	MPC · JPL
851383	2007 VP_{277}	—	October 16, 2007	Mount Lemmon	Mount Lemmon Survey	·	1.5 km	MPC · JPL
851384	2007 VW_{277}	—	October 30, 2007	Kitt Peak	Spacewatch	·	790 m	MPC · JPL
851385	2007 VD_{278}	—	October 12, 2007	Kitt Peak	Spacewatch	·	1.4 km	MPC · JPL
851386	2007 VG_{278}	—	November 14, 2007	Kitt Peak	Spacewatch	NYS	680 m	MPC · JPL
851387	2007 VD_{279}	—	November 7, 2007	Kitt Peak	Spacewatch	·	700 m	MPC · JPL
851388	2007 VJ_{283}	—	November 14, 2007	Kitt Peak	Spacewatch	·	380 m	MPC · JPL
851389	2007 VP_{288}	—	September 15, 2007	Catalina	CSS	·	1.6 km	MPC · JPL
851390	2007 VH_{297}	—	September 12, 2007	Catalina	CSS	·	710 m	MPC · JPL
851391	2007 VM_{301}	—	October 19, 2007	Catalina	CSS	·	880 m	MPC · JPL
851392	2007 VZ_{314}	—	November 3, 2007	Kitt Peak	Spacewatch	·	1.8 km	MPC · JPL
851393	2007 VK_{321}	—	November 8, 2007	Mount Lemmon	Mount Lemmon Survey	·	1.5 km	MPC · JPL
851394	2007 VX_{326}	—	November 5, 2007	Kitt Peak	Spacewatch	H	370 m	MPC · JPL
851395	2007 VN_{332}	—	November 8, 2007	Socorro	LINEAR	BAR	1.1 km	MPC · JPL
851396	2007 VZ_{337}	—	November 1, 2007	Mount Lemmon	Mount Lemmon Survey	·	1.2 km	MPC · JPL
851397	2007 VS_{339}	—	November 5, 2007	Mount Lemmon	Mount Lemmon Survey	·	780 m	MPC · JPL
851398	2007 VE_{340}	—	November 2, 2007	Mount Lemmon	Mount Lemmon Survey	·	1.4 km	MPC · JPL
851399	2007 VY_{340}	—	November 5, 2007	Mount Lemmon	Mount Lemmon Survey	·	1.1 km	MPC · JPL
851400	2007 VL_{341}	—	October 9, 2007	Catalina	CSS	·	1.1 km	MPC · JPL

== 851401–851500 ==
back to top

Designation			Discovery			Properties		Ref
Permanent	Provisional	Named after	Date	Site	Discoverer(s)	Category	Diam.	Ref
851401	2007 VU_{341}	—	November 11, 2007	Mount Lemmon	Mount Lemmon Survey	TIR	2.3 km	MPC · JPL
851402	2007 VW_{343}	—	November 5, 2007	Kitt Peak	Spacewatch	·	2.5 km	MPC · JPL
851403	2007 VO_{345}	—	March 19, 2009	Mount Lemmon	Mount Lemmon Survey	·	1.3 km	MPC · JPL
851404	2007 VQ_{345}	—	August 29, 2016	Mount Lemmon	Mount Lemmon Survey	·	1.4 km	MPC · JPL
851405	2007 VB_{346}	—	December 6, 2013	Haleakala	Pan-STARRS 1	·	620 m	MPC · JPL
851406	2007 VF_{346}	—	November 3, 2007	Kitt Peak	Spacewatch	·	1.5 km	MPC · JPL
851407	2007 VO_{346}	—	November 5, 2007	Kitt Peak	Spacewatch	·	430 m	MPC · JPL
851408	2007 VQ_{346}	—	September 13, 2007	Catalina	CSS	·	770 m	MPC · JPL
851409	2007 VS_{347}	—	November 3, 2007	Kitt Peak	Spacewatch	H	370 m	MPC · JPL
851410	2007 VY_{347}	—	November 9, 2007	Kitt Peak	Spacewatch	·	1.5 km	MPC · JPL
851411	2007 VH_{349}	—	December 11, 2014	Mount Lemmon	Mount Lemmon Survey	·	510 m	MPC · JPL
851412	2007 VF_{351}	—	November 2, 2007	Mount Lemmon	Mount Lemmon Survey	·	1.0 km	MPC · JPL
851413	2007 VC_{353}	—	November 3, 2007	Kitt Peak	Spacewatch	·	1.0 km	MPC · JPL
851414	2007 VQ_{353}	—	July 6, 2014	Haleakala	Pan-STARRS 1	V	430 m	MPC · JPL
851415	2007 VB_{354}	—	January 26, 2012	Haleakala	Pan-STARRS 1	·	680 m	MPC · JPL
851416	2007 VC_{354}	—	October 1, 2015	Mount Lemmon	Mount Lemmon Survey	EUN	880 m	MPC · JPL
851417	2007 VR_{354}	—	July 25, 2015	Haleakala	Pan-STARRS 1	·	1.3 km	MPC · JPL
851418	2007 VS_{354}	—	November 8, 2007	Mount Lemmon	Mount Lemmon Survey	·	2.1 km	MPC · JPL
851419	2007 VZ_{354}	—	May 8, 2014	Haleakala	Pan-STARRS 1	DOR	1.5 km	MPC · JPL
851420	2007 VK_{355}	—	February 3, 2012	Haleakala	Pan-STARRS 1	·	470 m	MPC · JPL
851421	2007 VA_{356}	—	December 4, 2016	Kitt Peak	Spacewatch	·	1.5 km	MPC · JPL
851422	2007 VO_{357}	—	February 22, 2009	Kitt Peak	Spacewatch	·	1.4 km	MPC · JPL
851423	2007 VS_{357}	—	November 12, 2007	Mount Lemmon	Mount Lemmon Survey	·	740 m	MPC · JPL
851424	2007 VB_{358}	—	February 26, 2012	Haleakala	Pan-STARRS 1	·	460 m	MPC · JPL
851425	2007 VK_{358}	—	November 2, 2007	Kitt Peak	Spacewatch	·	2.7 km	MPC · JPL
851426	2007 VP_{358}	—	April 26, 2017	Haleakala	Pan-STARRS 1	·	2.0 km	MPC · JPL
851427	2007 VV_{358}	—	November 8, 2007	Mount Lemmon	Mount Lemmon Survey	·	1.8 km	MPC · JPL
851428	2007 VF_{359}	—	November 1, 2007	Kitt Peak	Spacewatch	·	1.8 km	MPC · JPL
851429	2007 VC_{362}	—	October 23, 2012	Kitt Peak	Spacewatch	·	1.2 km	MPC · JPL
851430	2007 VE_{363}	—	November 13, 2007	Kitt Peak	Spacewatch	·	1.6 km	MPC · JPL
851431	2007 VS_{363}	—	November 3, 2007	Kitt Peak	Spacewatch	·	1.7 km	MPC · JPL
851432	2007 VD_{365}	—	November 9, 2007	Kitt Peak	Spacewatch	·	1.4 km	MPC · JPL
851433	2007 VA_{366}	—	November 15, 2007	Catalina	CSS	·	1.4 km	MPC · JPL
851434	2007 VN_{366}	—	November 9, 2007	Kitt Peak	Spacewatch	·	1.4 km	MPC · JPL
851435	2007 VR_{366}	—	November 4, 2007	Kitt Peak	Spacewatch	·	1.5 km	MPC · JPL
851436	2007 VS_{366}	—	November 7, 2007	Kitt Peak	Spacewatch	AGN	880 m	MPC · JPL
851437	2007 VW_{366}	—	November 6, 2007	Kitt Peak	Spacewatch	MAS	510 m	MPC · JPL
851438	2007 VX_{366}	—	November 14, 2007	Kitt Peak	Spacewatch	AGN	850 m	MPC · JPL
851439	2007 VE_{367}	—	November 12, 2007	Mount Lemmon	Mount Lemmon Survey	·	1.3 km	MPC · JPL
851440	2007 VQ_{367}	—	November 7, 2007	Kitt Peak	Spacewatch	MAS	460 m	MPC · JPL
851441	2007 VG_{368}	—	November 2, 2007	Mount Lemmon	Mount Lemmon Survey	·	440 m	MPC · JPL
851442	2007 VL_{368}	—	November 4, 2007	Kitt Peak	Spacewatch	·	1.4 km	MPC · JPL
851443	2007 VO_{369}	—	November 3, 2007	Mount Lemmon	Mount Lemmon Survey	·	1.2 km	MPC · JPL
851444	2007 VK_{370}	—	November 2, 2007	Mount Lemmon	Mount Lemmon Survey	·	500 m	MPC · JPL
851445	2007 VS_{370}	—	November 4, 2007	Kitt Peak	Spacewatch	AGN	790 m	MPC · JPL
851446	2007 VZ_{371}	—	November 15, 2007	Mount Lemmon	Mount Lemmon Survey	·	910 m	MPC · JPL
851447	2007 VJ_{372}	—	November 4, 2007	Kitt Peak	Spacewatch	·	1.1 km	MPC · JPL
851448	2007 VP_{372}	—	November 5, 2007	Kitt Peak	Spacewatch	·	460 m	MPC · JPL
851449	2007 VX_{372}	—	November 1, 2007	Kitt Peak	Spacewatch	·	850 m	MPC · JPL
851450	2007 VJ_{373}	—	November 7, 2007	Kitt Peak	Spacewatch	·	620 m	MPC · JPL
851451	2007 VL_{373}	—	November 4, 2007	Kitt Peak	Spacewatch	·	700 m	MPC · JPL
851452	2007 VT_{373}	—	November 12, 2007	Mount Lemmon	Mount Lemmon Survey	MAR	850 m	MPC · JPL
851453	2007 VV_{374}	—	November 3, 2007	Kitt Peak	Spacewatch	AGN	800 m	MPC · JPL
851454	2007 VP_{376}	—	November 9, 2007	Kitt Peak	Spacewatch	·	2.6 km	MPC · JPL
851455	2007 VE_{378}	—	November 5, 2007	Mount Lemmon	Mount Lemmon Survey	·	1.3 km	MPC · JPL
851456	2007 VS_{378}	—	November 8, 2007	Kitt Peak	Spacewatch	·	700 m	MPC · JPL
851457	2007 VA_{379}	—	November 4, 2007	Mount Lemmon	Mount Lemmon Survey	·	1.5 km	MPC · JPL
851458	2007 VA_{380}	—	November 12, 2007	Mount Lemmon	Mount Lemmon Survey	·	920 m	MPC · JPL
851459	2007 VJ_{380}	—	November 8, 2007	Mount Lemmon	Mount Lemmon Survey	AGN	840 m	MPC · JPL
851460	2007 VP_{380}	—	November 8, 2007	Kitt Peak	Spacewatch	·	1.4 km	MPC · JPL
851461	2007 VR_{380}	—	November 15, 2007	Mount Lemmon	Mount Lemmon Survey	·	810 m	MPC · JPL
851462	2007 VV_{380}	—	November 2, 2007	Kitt Peak	Spacewatch	·	1.4 km	MPC · JPL
851463	2007 VD_{381}	—	November 7, 2007	Kitt Peak	Spacewatch	T_{j} (2.96)	2.9 km	MPC · JPL
851464	2007 VJ_{381}	—	November 2, 2007	Mount Lemmon	Mount Lemmon Survey	DOR	1.6 km	MPC · JPL
851465	2007 VA_{382}	—	November 3, 2007	Mount Lemmon	Mount Lemmon Survey	·	1.1 km	MPC · JPL
851466	2007 VJ_{382}	—	November 14, 2007	Kitt Peak	Spacewatch	·	940 m	MPC · JPL
851467	2007 VM_{383}	—	November 8, 2007	Kitt Peak	Spacewatch	·	1.4 km	MPC · JPL
851468	2007 VU_{386}	—	November 1, 2007	Mount Lemmon	Mount Lemmon Survey	·	890 m	MPC · JPL
851469	2007 VD_{389}	—	November 2, 2007	Mount Lemmon	Mount Lemmon Survey	·	1.3 km	MPC · JPL
851470	2007 WV_{3}	—	November 18, 2007	Mount Lemmon	Mount Lemmon Survey	APO	390 m	MPC · JPL
851471	2007 WY_{3}	—	November 18, 2007	Mount Lemmon	Mount Lemmon Survey	T_{j} (2.78) · APO	780 m	MPC · JPL
851472	2007 WB_{9}	—	September 12, 2007	Mount Lemmon	Mount Lemmon Survey	THB	1.9 km	MPC · JPL
851473	2007 WG_{9}	—	October 9, 2007	Kitt Peak	Spacewatch	·	590 m	MPC · JPL
851474	2007 WX_{14}	—	September 16, 2003	Kitt Peak	Spacewatch	MAS	480 m	MPC · JPL
851475	2007 WR_{17}	—	October 9, 2007	Mount Lemmon	Mount Lemmon Survey	·	510 m	MPC · JPL
851476	2007 WQ_{27}	—	November 18, 2007	Mount Lemmon	Mount Lemmon Survey	·	1.6 km	MPC · JPL
851477	2007 WD_{30}	—	November 19, 2007	Kitt Peak	Spacewatch	JUN	600 m	MPC · JPL
851478	2007 WH_{30}	—	November 2, 2007	Kitt Peak	Spacewatch	·	730 m	MPC · JPL
851479	2007 WY_{32}	—	November 19, 2007	Mount Lemmon	Mount Lemmon Survey	ADE	1.4 km	MPC · JPL
851480	2007 WP_{36}	—	November 4, 2007	Kitt Peak	Spacewatch	·	450 m	MPC · JPL
851481	2007 WU_{37}	—	November 19, 2007	Mount Lemmon	Mount Lemmon Survey	·	480 m	MPC · JPL
851482	2007 WP_{39}	—	November 12, 2007	Mount Lemmon	Mount Lemmon Survey	·	670 m	MPC · JPL
851483	2007 WF_{41}	—	March 8, 2005	Mount Lemmon	Mount Lemmon Survey	·	670 m	MPC · JPL
851484	2007 WM_{43}	—	September 16, 2003	Kitt Peak	Spacewatch	·	680 m	MPC · JPL
851485	2007 WU_{45}	—	October 21, 2007	Mount Lemmon	Mount Lemmon Survey	·	900 m	MPC · JPL
851486	2007 WP_{48}	—	November 11, 2007	Catalina	CSS	T_{j} (2.94)	2.7 km	MPC · JPL
851487	2007 WA_{51}	—	November 20, 2007	Mount Lemmon	Mount Lemmon Survey	MAS	410 m	MPC · JPL
851488	2007 WZ_{54}	—	November 20, 2007	Mount Lemmon	Mount Lemmon Survey	·	1.4 km	MPC · JPL
851489	2007 WN_{60}	—	November 18, 2007	Kitt Peak	Spacewatch	·	1.1 km	MPC · JPL
851490	2007 WC_{64}	—	November 20, 2007	Kitt Peak	Spacewatch	MRX	700 m	MPC · JPL
851491	2007 WY_{65}	—	November 19, 2007	Mount Lemmon	Mount Lemmon Survey	GEF	900 m	MPC · JPL
851492	2007 WA_{66}	—	November 17, 2007	Kitt Peak	Spacewatch	·	870 m	MPC · JPL
851493	2007 WE_{66}	—	November 4, 2007	Kitt Peak	Spacewatch	·	1.3 km	MPC · JPL
851494	2007 WK_{66}	—	December 12, 2012	Kitt Peak	Spacewatch	·	1.5 km	MPC · JPL
851495	2007 WQ_{66}	—	January 17, 2013	Haleakala	Pan-STARRS 1	·	1.4 km	MPC · JPL
851496	2007 WH_{68}	—	November 7, 2007	Kitt Peak	Spacewatch	·	670 m	MPC · JPL
851497	2007 WL_{68}	—	November 20, 2007	Mount Lemmon	Mount Lemmon Survey	(194)	1.2 km	MPC · JPL
851498	2007 WS_{68}	—	May 1, 2009	Kitt Peak	Spacewatch	·	1.4 km	MPC · JPL
851499	2007 WY_{68}	—	June 21, 2010	Mount Lemmon	Mount Lemmon Survey	·	960 m	MPC · JPL
851500	2007 WC_{70}	—	October 3, 2014	Mount Lemmon	Mount Lemmon Survey	·	570 m	MPC · JPL

== 851501–851600 ==
back to top

Designation			Discovery			Properties		Ref
Permanent	Provisional	Named after	Date	Site	Discoverer(s)	Category	Diam.	Ref
851501	2007 WB_{72}	—	November 19, 2007	Kitt Peak	Spacewatch	·	770 m	MPC · JPL
851502	2007 WE_{72}	—	November 19, 2007	Kitt Peak	Spacewatch	THM	1.7 km	MPC · JPL
851503	2007 WE_{73}	—	November 19, 2007	Mount Lemmon	Mount Lemmon Survey	·	1.4 km	MPC · JPL
851504	2007 WT_{73}	—	November 20, 2007	Kitt Peak	Spacewatch	·	1.1 km	MPC · JPL
851505	2007 WV_{73}	—	November 19, 2007	Kitt Peak	Spacewatch	JUN	770 m	MPC · JPL
851506	2007 WY_{73}	—	November 20, 2007	Kitt Peak	Spacewatch	·	1.3 km	MPC · JPL
851507	2007 WG_{74}	—	November 18, 2007	Mount Lemmon	Mount Lemmon Survey	·	490 m	MPC · JPL
851508	2007 WO_{75}	—	November 18, 2007	Mount Lemmon	Mount Lemmon Survey	NYS	850 m	MPC · JPL
851509	2007 WB_{76}	—	November 20, 2007	Kitt Peak	Spacewatch	·	500 m	MPC · JPL
851510	2007 XT	—	December 2, 2007	Socorro	LINEAR	·	900 m	MPC · JPL
851511	2007 XS_{31}	—	December 15, 2007	Catalina	CSS	·	1.7 km	MPC · JPL
851512	2007 XD_{36}	—	December 18, 2007	Kitt Peak	Spacewatch	PHO	830 m	MPC · JPL
851513	2007 XW_{48}	—	December 15, 2007	Kitt Peak	Spacewatch	·	770 m	MPC · JPL
851514	2007 XK_{55}	—	December 4, 2007	Mount Lemmon	Mount Lemmon Survey	LUT	2.7 km	MPC · JPL
851515	2007 XX_{60}	—	December 4, 2007	Mount Lemmon	Mount Lemmon Survey	·	1.6 km	MPC · JPL
851516	2007 XL_{63}	—	December 5, 2007	Kitt Peak	Spacewatch	·	440 m	MPC · JPL
851517	2007 XZ_{63}	—	December 6, 2007	Mount Lemmon	Mount Lemmon Survey	·	390 m	MPC · JPL
851518	2007 XL_{65}	—	December 4, 2007	Kitt Peak	Spacewatch	·	1.3 km	MPC · JPL
851519	2007 XG_{66}	—	August 7, 2016	Haleakala	Pan-STARRS 1	(18466)	1.6 km	MPC · JPL
851520	2007 XV_{66}	—	January 19, 2012	Haleakala	Pan-STARRS 1	·	570 m	MPC · JPL
851521	2007 XQ_{67}	—	February 27, 2012	Haleakala	Pan-STARRS 1	·	560 m	MPC · JPL
851522	2007 XA_{68}	—	December 4, 2007	Kitt Peak	Spacewatch	·	520 m	MPC · JPL
851523	2007 XO_{68}	—	November 1, 2007	Kitt Peak	Spacewatch	·	1.1 km	MPC · JPL
851524	2007 XP_{68}	—	December 3, 2007	Kitt Peak	Spacewatch	·	640 m	MPC · JPL
851525	2007 XT_{68}	—	December 5, 2007	Kitt Peak	Spacewatch	·	710 m	MPC · JPL
851526	2007 XW_{68}	—	December 5, 2007	Kitt Peak	Spacewatch	·	1.6 km	MPC · JPL
851527	2007 XS_{70}	—	December 15, 2007	Mount Lemmon	Mount Lemmon Survey	·	1.1 km	MPC · JPL
851528	2007 XM_{71}	—	December 5, 2007	Kitt Peak	Spacewatch	·	770 m	MPC · JPL
851529	2007 XN_{71}	—	December 5, 2007	Kitt Peak	Spacewatch	·	1.5 km	MPC · JPL
851530	2007 XY_{71}	—	December 5, 2007	Kitt Peak	Spacewatch	·	630 m	MPC · JPL
851531	2007 XA_{72}	—	December 4, 2007	Kitt Peak	Spacewatch	·	550 m	MPC · JPL
851532	2007 XB_{72}	—	December 5, 2007	Kitt Peak	Spacewatch	H	390 m	MPC · JPL
851533	2007 XK_{72}	—	December 4, 2007	Mount Lemmon	Mount Lemmon Survey	·	430 m	MPC · JPL
851534	2007 YX_{1}	—	October 21, 2007	Catalina	CSS	T_{j} (2.97) · AMO +1km	1.2 km	MPC · JPL
851535	2007 YP_{2}	—	December 19, 2007	Kitt Peak	Spacewatch	H	360 m	MPC · JPL
851536	2007 YS_{4}	—	November 5, 2007	Kitt Peak	Spacewatch	HNS	760 m	MPC · JPL
851537	2007 YX_{11}	—	December 17, 2007	Mount Lemmon	Mount Lemmon Survey	BRA	1.0 km	MPC · JPL
851538	2007 YE_{13}	—	December 17, 2007	Mount Lemmon	Mount Lemmon Survey	EOS	1.4 km	MPC · JPL
851539	2007 YH_{13}	—	December 17, 2007	Mount Lemmon	Mount Lemmon Survey	·	1.7 km	MPC · JPL
851540	2007 YL_{19}	—	December 16, 2007	Kitt Peak	Spacewatch	AGN	890 m	MPC · JPL
851541	2007 YR_{25}	—	December 18, 2007	Mount Lemmon	Mount Lemmon Survey	TEL	1.1 km	MPC · JPL
851542	2007 YT_{25}	—	December 18, 2007	Mount Lemmon	Mount Lemmon Survey	·	780 m	MPC · JPL
851543	2007 YB_{26}	—	December 18, 2007	Kitt Peak	Spacewatch	MRX	660 m	MPC · JPL
851544	2007 YR_{28}	—	December 19, 2007	Kitt Peak	Spacewatch	·	1.5 km	MPC · JPL
851545	2007 YT_{29}	—	December 5, 2007	Kitt Peak	Spacewatch	·	800 m	MPC · JPL
851546	2007 YQ_{47}	—	December 16, 2007	Mount Lemmon	Mount Lemmon Survey	·	300 m	MPC · JPL
851547	2007 YN_{52}	—	December 30, 2007	Catalina	CSS	H	390 m	MPC · JPL
851548	2007 YO_{54}	—	December 1, 2003	Kitt Peak	Spacewatch	·	900 m	MPC · JPL
851549	2007 YV_{57}	—	December 31, 2007	Kitt Peak	Spacewatch	·	1.8 km	MPC · JPL
851550	2007 YK_{61}	—	December 31, 2007	Catalina	CSS	·	1.7 km	MPC · JPL
851551	2007 YG_{80}	—	October 22, 2012	Haleakala	Pan-STARRS 1	·	1.5 km	MPC · JPL
851552	2007 YD_{81}	—	December 17, 2007	Kitt Peak	Spacewatch	·	1.4 km	MPC · JPL
851553	2007 YE_{84}	—	December 18, 2007	Kitt Peak	Spacewatch	·	700 m	MPC · JPL
851554	2007 YC_{86}	—	December 16, 2007	Mount Lemmon	Mount Lemmon Survey	H	390 m	MPC · JPL
851555	2007 YU_{86}	—	May 9, 2014	Haleakala	Pan-STARRS 1	TIN	920 m	MPC · JPL
851556	2007 YA_{87}	—	December 31, 2007	Mount Lemmon	Mount Lemmon Survey	EUN	840 m	MPC · JPL
851557	2007 YY_{89}	—	December 30, 2007	Kitt Peak	Spacewatch	·	1.4 km	MPC · JPL
851558	2007 YP_{90}	—	December 18, 2007	Kitt Peak	Spacewatch	AGN	860 m	MPC · JPL
851559	2007 YL_{91}	—	December 30, 2007	Kitt Peak	Spacewatch	·	1.3 km	MPC · JPL
851560	2007 YQ_{91}	—	December 17, 2007	Mount Lemmon	Mount Lemmon Survey	·	1.1 km	MPC · JPL
851561	2007 YU_{91}	—	December 19, 2007	Mount Lemmon	Mount Lemmon Survey	GEF	770 m	MPC · JPL
851562	2007 YV_{92}	—	December 31, 2007	Mount Lemmon	Mount Lemmon Survey	·	2.4 km	MPC · JPL
851563	2007 YZ_{93}	—	December 30, 2007	Mount Lemmon	Mount Lemmon Survey	·	1.6 km	MPC · JPL
851564	2007 YA_{94}	—	December 19, 2007	Mount Lemmon	Mount Lemmon Survey	·	1.3 km	MPC · JPL
851565	2007 YH_{96}	—	December 17, 2007	Mount Lemmon	Mount Lemmon Survey	·	710 m	MPC · JPL
851566	2007 YB_{97}	—	December 16, 2007	Catalina	CSS	·	1.7 km	MPC · JPL
851567	2007 YK_{97}	—	December 17, 2007	Mount Lemmon	Mount Lemmon Survey	·	1.2 km	MPC · JPL
851568	2007 YR_{97}	—	December 31, 2007	Kitt Peak	Spacewatch	·	1.2 km	MPC · JPL
851569	2007 YE_{99}	—	December 16, 2007	Mount Lemmon	Mount Lemmon Survey	·	1.9 km	MPC · JPL
851570	2008 AQ_{6}	—	November 6, 2007	Kitt Peak	Spacewatch	·	1.2 km	MPC · JPL
851571	2008 AQ_{9}	—	January 10, 2008	Mount Lemmon	Mount Lemmon Survey	·	820 m	MPC · JPL
851572	2008 AE_{15}	—	December 30, 2007	Kitt Peak	Spacewatch	·	1.3 km	MPC · JPL
851573	2008 AK_{15}	—	January 10, 2008	Kitt Peak	Spacewatch	·	1.1 km	MPC · JPL
851574	2008 AE_{16}	—	January 10, 2008	Mount Lemmon	Mount Lemmon Survey	·	720 m	MPC · JPL
851575	2008 AG_{16}	—	January 10, 2008	Mount Lemmon	Mount Lemmon Survey	·	1.3 km	MPC · JPL
851576	2008 AP_{35}	—	December 30, 2007	Mount Lemmon	Mount Lemmon Survey	·	1.3 km	MPC · JPL
851577	2008 AJ_{38}	—	December 18, 2007	Mount Lemmon	Mount Lemmon Survey	·	1.4 km	MPC · JPL
851578	2008 AX_{45}	—	November 18, 2007	Kitt Peak	Spacewatch	MRX	730 m	MPC · JPL
851579	2008 AA_{49}	—	January 11, 2008	Kitt Peak	Spacewatch	EOS	1.3 km	MPC · JPL
851580	2008 AM_{50}	—	January 11, 2008	Kitt Peak	Spacewatch	NYS	770 m	MPC · JPL
851581	2008 AH_{51}	—	December 28, 2007	Kitt Peak	Spacewatch	·	850 m	MPC · JPL
851582	2008 AT_{53}	—	November 13, 2007	Mount Lemmon	Mount Lemmon Survey	·	1.4 km	MPC · JPL
851583	2008 AV_{55}	—	December 30, 2007	Kitt Peak	Spacewatch	·	1.8 km	MPC · JPL
851584	2008 AS_{60}	—	January 11, 2008	Kitt Peak	Spacewatch	·	880 m	MPC · JPL
851585	2008 AJ_{70}	—	January 12, 2008	Mount Lemmon	Mount Lemmon Survey	·	740 m	MPC · JPL
851586	2008 AZ_{72}	—	January 10, 2008	Kitt Peak	Spacewatch	H	350 m	MPC · JPL
851587	2008 AD_{78}	—	December 31, 2007	Mount Lemmon	Mount Lemmon Survey	·	830 m	MPC · JPL
851588	2008 AH_{79}	—	January 12, 2008	Kitt Peak	Spacewatch	·	1.5 km	MPC · JPL
851589	2008 AQ_{82}	—	January 14, 2008	Kitt Peak	Spacewatch	·	1.2 km	MPC · JPL
851590	2008 AM_{89}	—	January 13, 2008	Kitt Peak	Spacewatch	EUN	790 m	MPC · JPL
851591	2008 AD_{91}	—	January 13, 2008	Kitt Peak	Spacewatch	·	790 m	MPC · JPL
851592	2008 AU_{93}	—	January 1, 2008	Kitt Peak	Spacewatch	DOR	1.9 km	MPC · JPL
851593	2008 AL_{94}	—	December 30, 2007	Kitt Peak	Spacewatch	·	1.4 km	MPC · JPL
851594	2008 AE_{99}	—	January 14, 2008	Kitt Peak	Spacewatch	H	360 m	MPC · JPL
851595	2008 AD_{104}	—	December 23, 1998	Kitt Peak	Spacewatch	·	1.9 km	MPC · JPL
851596	2008 AD_{117}	—	January 1, 2008	Kitt Peak	Spacewatch	·	880 m	MPC · JPL
851597	2008 AU_{119}	—	January 6, 2008	Mauna Kea	P. A. Wiegert	·	2.2 km	MPC · JPL
851598	2008 AA_{124}	—	January 6, 2008	Mauna Kea	P. A. Wiegert	·	490 m	MPC · JPL
851599	2008 AZ_{130}	—	January 6, 2008	Mauna Kea	P. A. Wiegert, A. M. Gilbert	·	730 m	MPC · JPL
851600	2008 AE_{131}	—	January 6, 2008	Mauna Kea	P. A. Wiegert, A. M. Gilbert	·	770 m	MPC · JPL

== 851601–851700 ==
back to top

Designation			Discovery			Properties		Ref
Permanent	Provisional	Named after	Date	Site	Discoverer(s)	Category	Diam.	Ref
851601	2008 AY_{138}	—	December 31, 2007	Mount Lemmon	Mount Lemmon Survey	·	1.6 km	MPC · JPL
851602	2008 AM_{141}	—	January 10, 2008	Kitt Peak	Spacewatch	·	800 m	MPC · JPL
851603	2008 AM_{142}	—	October 8, 2013	Kitt Peak	Spacewatch	·	540 m	MPC · JPL
851604	2008 AD_{143}	—	January 10, 2008	Mount Lemmon	Mount Lemmon Survey	NYS	790 m	MPC · JPL
851605	2008 AO_{143}	—	January 10, 2008	Kitt Peak	Spacewatch	·	1.2 km	MPC · JPL
851606	2008 AD_{145}	—	February 8, 2013	Haleakala	Pan-STARRS 1	DOR	1.8 km	MPC · JPL
851607	2008 AL_{145}	—	January 10, 2008	Mount Lemmon	Mount Lemmon Survey	·	890 m	MPC · JPL
851608	2008 AW_{145}	—	January 11, 2008	Kitt Peak	Spacewatch	·	850 m	MPC · JPL
851609	2008 AY_{145}	—	January 14, 2008	Kitt Peak	Spacewatch	·	690 m	MPC · JPL
851610	2008 AL_{146}	—	November 1, 1994	Kitt Peak	Spacewatch	·	730 m	MPC · JPL
851611	2008 AR_{147}	—	December 21, 2014	Haleakala	Pan-STARRS 1	(2076)	500 m	MPC · JPL
851612	2008 AM_{151}	—	January 12, 2008	Mount Lemmon	Mount Lemmon Survey	·	1.4 km	MPC · JPL
851613	2008 AO_{151}	—	January 10, 2008	Mount Lemmon	Mount Lemmon Survey	·	1.5 km	MPC · JPL
851614	2008 AD_{152}	—	January 13, 2008	Kitt Peak	Spacewatch	·	1.4 km	MPC · JPL
851615	2008 AL_{152}	—	January 14, 2008	Kitt Peak	Spacewatch	·	1.4 km	MPC · JPL
851616	2008 AV_{153}	—	January 14, 2008	Kitt Peak	Spacewatch	·	1.7 km	MPC · JPL
851617	2008 AT_{154}	—	January 10, 2008	Mount Lemmon	Mount Lemmon Survey	·	1.9 km	MPC · JPL
851618	2008 AD_{155}	—	January 10, 2008	Mount Lemmon	Mount Lemmon Survey	(43176)	1.8 km	MPC · JPL
851619	2008 AE_{155}	—	January 1, 2008	Kitt Peak	Spacewatch	ERI	950 m	MPC · JPL
851620	2008 AK_{155}	—	January 11, 2008	Kitt Peak	Spacewatch	PHO	660 m	MPC · JPL
851621	2008 BW	—	January 16, 2008	Mount Lemmon	Mount Lemmon Survey	·	1.0 km	MPC · JPL
851622	2008 BR_{1}	—	January 16, 2008	Kitt Peak	Spacewatch	·	1.2 km	MPC · JPL
851623	2008 BU_{3}	—	January 16, 2008	Kitt Peak	Spacewatch	·	1.6 km	MPC · JPL
851624	2008 BC_{31}	—	January 30, 2008	Mount Lemmon	Mount Lemmon Survey	·	680 m	MPC · JPL
851625	2008 BZ_{36}	—	January 31, 2008	Mount Lemmon	Mount Lemmon Survey	NYS	750 m	MPC · JPL
851626	2008 BQ_{45}	—	January 11, 2008	Catalina	CSS	·	530 m	MPC · JPL
851627	2008 BL_{46}	—	December 31, 2007	Mount Lemmon	Mount Lemmon Survey	·	1.7 km	MPC · JPL
851628	2008 BM_{53}	—	January 20, 2008	Mount Lemmon	Mount Lemmon Survey	JUN	710 m	MPC · JPL
851629	2008 BN_{56}	—	January 18, 2008	Kitt Peak	Spacewatch	·	520 m	MPC · JPL
851630	2008 BB_{57}	—	January 30, 2008	Mount Lemmon	Mount Lemmon Survey	·	540 m	MPC · JPL
851631	2008 BC_{57}	—	January 30, 2008	Mount Lemmon	Mount Lemmon Survey	·	970 m	MPC · JPL
851632	2008 BK_{57}	—	November 22, 2011	Mount Lemmon	Mount Lemmon Survey	·	990 m	MPC · JPL
851633	2008 BJ_{58}	—	January 18, 2008	Mount Lemmon	Mount Lemmon Survey	·	520 m	MPC · JPL
851634	2008 BN_{58}	—	January 31, 2008	Mount Lemmon	Mount Lemmon Survey	·	1.0 km	MPC · JPL
851635	2008 BV_{58}	—	January 30, 2008	Kitt Peak	Spacewatch	·	750 m	MPC · JPL
851636	2008 BH_{59}	—	October 12, 2015	Haleakala	Pan-STARRS 1	WIT	700 m	MPC · JPL
851637	2008 BQ_{59}	—	October 27, 2011	Zelenchukskaya	T. V. Krjačko	·	990 m	MPC · JPL
851638	2008 BS_{59}	—	January 31, 2008	Mount Lemmon	Mount Lemmon Survey	·	810 m	MPC · JPL
851639	2008 BG_{60}	—	January 19, 2008	Mount Lemmon	Mount Lemmon Survey	·	760 m	MPC · JPL
851640	2008 BK_{60}	—	January 30, 2008	Mount Lemmon	Mount Lemmon Survey	·	840 m	MPC · JPL
851641	2008 BV_{60}	—	January 16, 2008	Kitt Peak	Spacewatch	·	710 m	MPC · JPL
851642	2008 BG_{61}	—	January 17, 2008	Mount Lemmon	Mount Lemmon Survey	·	1.7 km	MPC · JPL
851643	2008 BP_{61}	—	January 20, 2008	Kitt Peak	Spacewatch	·	670 m	MPC · JPL
851644	2008 BK_{62}	—	January 16, 2008	Kitt Peak	Spacewatch	·	1.2 km	MPC · JPL
851645	2008 BS_{62}	—	January 16, 2008	Mount Lemmon	Mount Lemmon Survey	PHO	700 m	MPC · JPL
851646	2008 BU_{62}	—	January 30, 2008	Mount Lemmon	Mount Lemmon Survey	MAS	540 m	MPC · JPL
851647	2008 CD_{35}	—	February 2, 2008	Kitt Peak	Spacewatch	·	880 m	MPC · JPL
851648	2008 CF_{40}	—	July 12, 2015	Haleakala	Pan-STARRS 1	·	1.3 km	MPC · JPL
851649	2008 CU_{42}	—	February 2, 2008	Kitt Peak	Spacewatch	·	820 m	MPC · JPL
851650	2008 CL_{50}	—	January 18, 2008	Mount Lemmon	Mount Lemmon Survey	PHO	840 m	MPC · JPL
851651	2008 CL_{53}	—	February 2, 2001	Kitt Peak	Spacewatch	·	700 m	MPC · JPL
851652	2008 CS_{56}	—	December 30, 2007	Mount Lemmon	Mount Lemmon Survey	·	1.8 km	MPC · JPL
851653	2008 CB_{58}	—	February 7, 2008	Mount Lemmon	Mount Lemmon Survey	·	820 m	MPC · JPL
851654	2008 CN_{63}	—	February 8, 2008	Mount Lemmon	Mount Lemmon Survey	·	840 m	MPC · JPL
851655	2008 CM_{67}	—	February 8, 2008	Mount Lemmon	Mount Lemmon Survey	·	950 m	MPC · JPL
851656	2008 CN_{67}	—	February 8, 2008	Mount Lemmon	Mount Lemmon Survey	·	1.2 km	MPC · JPL
851657	2008 CD_{78}	—	November 5, 2007	Mount Lemmon	Mount Lemmon Survey	·	1.4 km	MPC · JPL
851658	2008 CY_{91}	—	February 8, 2008	Kitt Peak	Spacewatch	NYS	930 m	MPC · JPL
851659	2008 CB_{92}	—	July 31, 2000	Cerro Tololo	Deep Ecliptic Survey	·	1.5 km	MPC · JPL
851660	2008 CD_{93}	—	January 30, 2008	Mount Lemmon	Mount Lemmon Survey	H	360 m	MPC · JPL
851661	2008 CH_{96}	—	December 31, 2007	Mount Lemmon	Mount Lemmon Survey	·	1.6 km	MPC · JPL
851662	2008 CM_{103}	—	February 9, 2008	Kitt Peak	Spacewatch	·	1.4 km	MPC · JPL
851663	2008 CV_{103}	—	February 9, 2008	Kitt Peak	Spacewatch	·	580 m	MPC · JPL
851664	2008 CZ_{113}	—	February 10, 2008	Kitt Peak	Spacewatch	·	1.7 km	MPC · JPL
851665	2008 CA_{124}	—	January 10, 2008	Kitt Peak	Spacewatch	·	1.5 km	MPC · JPL
851666	2008 CE_{131}	—	February 8, 2008	Kitt Peak	Spacewatch	·	830 m	MPC · JPL
851667	2008 CL_{131}	—	February 8, 2008	Kitt Peak	Spacewatch	·	940 m	MPC · JPL
851668	2008 CP_{132}	—	February 8, 2008	Kitt Peak	Spacewatch	MAS	510 m	MPC · JPL
851669	2008 CC_{135}	—	February 8, 2008	Mount Lemmon	Mount Lemmon Survey	·	410 m	MPC · JPL
851670	2008 CG_{136}	—	February 8, 2008	Mount Lemmon	Mount Lemmon Survey	NYS	760 m	MPC · JPL
851671	2008 CL_{149}	—	February 9, 2008	Kitt Peak	Spacewatch	·	830 m	MPC · JPL
851672	2008 CY_{151}	—	February 9, 2008	Kitt Peak	Spacewatch	·	1.2 km	MPC · JPL
851673	2008 CZ_{153}	—	February 9, 2008	Kitt Peak	Spacewatch	·	760 m	MPC · JPL
851674	2008 CR_{154}	—	February 9, 2008	Kitt Peak	Spacewatch	·	2.0 km	MPC · JPL
851675	2008 CN_{163}	—	January 20, 2008	Kitt Peak	Spacewatch	·	1.6 km	MPC · JPL
851676	2008 CG_{166}	—	February 10, 2008	Kitt Peak	Spacewatch	PHO	490 m	MPC · JPL
851677	2008 CV_{174}	—	February 13, 2008	Kitt Peak	Spacewatch	·	790 m	MPC · JPL
851678	2008 CG_{176}	—	January 1, 2008	Kitt Peak	Spacewatch	·	1.6 km	MPC · JPL
851679	2008 CE_{181}	—	January 13, 2008	Catalina	CSS	PHO	910 m	MPC · JPL
851680	2008 CC_{184}	—	February 14, 2008	Mount Lemmon	Mount Lemmon Survey	PHO	630 m	MPC · JPL
851681	2008 CX_{190}	—	February 1, 2008	Kitt Peak	Spacewatch	·	440 m	MPC · JPL
851682	2008 CK_{192}	—	February 2, 2008	Kitt Peak	Spacewatch	BRA	1.0 km	MPC · JPL
851683	2008 CD_{219}	—	January 13, 2008	Kitt Peak	Spacewatch	V	400 m	MPC · JPL
851684	2008 CN_{219}	—	February 13, 2008	Catalina	CSS	·	1.1 km	MPC · JPL
851685	2008 CX_{223}	—	February 7, 2008	Mount Lemmon	Mount Lemmon Survey	·	860 m	MPC · JPL
851686	2008 CR_{224}	—	December 18, 2007	Mount Lemmon	Mount Lemmon Survey	·	930 m	MPC · JPL
851687	2008 CT_{224}	—	February 23, 2012	Kitt Peak	Spacewatch	·	910 m	MPC · JPL
851688	2008 CA_{226}	—	February 13, 2008	Kitt Peak	Spacewatch	·	1.0 km	MPC · JPL
851689	2008 CJ_{226}	—	February 10, 2008	Kitt Peak	Spacewatch	H	350 m	MPC · JPL
851690	2008 CO_{226}	—	February 11, 2008	Mount Lemmon	Mount Lemmon Survey	·	890 m	MPC · JPL
851691	2008 CX_{230}	—	August 27, 2016	Haleakala	Pan-STARRS 1	·	2.4 km	MPC · JPL
851692	2008 CD_{231}	—	February 13, 2008	Mount Lemmon	Mount Lemmon Survey	V	410 m	MPC · JPL
851693	2008 CF_{231}	—	November 26, 2014	Haleakala	Pan-STARRS 1	·	740 m	MPC · JPL
851694	2008 CO_{231}	—	February 7, 2008	Kitt Peak	Spacewatch	·	890 m	MPC · JPL
851695	2008 CQ_{231}	—	December 2, 2010	Mount Lemmon	Mount Lemmon Survey	·	480 m	MPC · JPL
851696	2008 CW_{231}	—	March 19, 2013	Haleakala	Pan-STARRS 1	·	1.2 km	MPC · JPL
851697	2008 CQ_{233}	—	January 21, 2013	Mount Lemmon	Mount Lemmon Survey	H	360 m	MPC · JPL
851698	2008 CY_{234}	—	January 16, 2015	Haleakala	Pan-STARRS 1	·	450 m	MPC · JPL
851699	2008 CN_{236}	—	February 14, 2008	Mount Lemmon	Mount Lemmon Survey	·	1.3 km	MPC · JPL
851700	2008 CD_{237}	—	September 14, 2014	Mount Lemmon	Mount Lemmon Survey	GEF	980 m	MPC · JPL

== 851701–851800 ==
back to top

Designation			Discovery			Properties		Ref
Permanent	Provisional	Named after	Date	Site	Discoverer(s)	Category	Diam.	Ref
851701	2008 CY_{237}	—	December 23, 2012	Haleakala	Pan-STARRS 1	·	1.6 km	MPC · JPL
851702	2008 CM_{238}	—	February 9, 2008	Mount Lemmon	Mount Lemmon Survey	·	430 m	MPC · JPL
851703	2008 CR_{239}	—	February 8, 2008	Kitt Peak	Spacewatch	MAR	720 m	MPC · JPL
851704	2008 CV_{240}	—	February 8, 2008	Kitt Peak	Spacewatch	·	1.5 km	MPC · JPL
851705	2008 CR_{242}	—	February 3, 2008	Mount Lemmon	Mount Lemmon Survey	·	1.6 km	MPC · JPL
851706	2008 CC_{243}	—	February 8, 2008	Kitt Peak	Spacewatch	KOR	1.0 km	MPC · JPL
851707	2008 CE_{243}	—	February 9, 2008	Kitt Peak	Spacewatch	KOR	980 m	MPC · JPL
851708	2008 CY_{246}	—	January 11, 2008	Kitt Peak	Spacewatch	·	710 m	MPC · JPL
851709	2008 CC_{247}	—	February 2, 2008	Mount Lemmon	Mount Lemmon Survey	·	1.5 km	MPC · JPL
851710	2008 CU_{247}	—	February 10, 2008	Mount Lemmon	Mount Lemmon Survey	·	2.2 km	MPC · JPL
851711	2008 CS_{248}	—	February 3, 2008	Kitt Peak	Spacewatch	BRA	1.1 km	MPC · JPL
851712	2008 CV_{252}	—	February 12, 2008	Mount Lemmon	Mount Lemmon Survey	·	890 m	MPC · JPL
851713	2008 DF_{2}	—	December 18, 2007	Mount Lemmon	Mount Lemmon Survey	·	1.5 km	MPC · JPL
851714	2008 DM_{5}	—	February 28, 2008	Mount Lemmon	Mount Lemmon Survey	·	1.7 km	MPC · JPL
851715	2008 DK_{6}	—	February 24, 2008	Mount Lemmon	Mount Lemmon Survey	·	480 m	MPC · JPL
851716	2008 DM_{9}	—	February 25, 2008	Kitt Peak	Spacewatch	·	1.3 km	MPC · JPL
851717	2008 DM_{30}	—	February 13, 2008	Kitt Peak	Spacewatch	·	1.2 km	MPC · JPL
851718	2008 DJ_{42}	—	February 7, 2008	Kitt Peak	Spacewatch	·	1.3 km	MPC · JPL
851719	2008 DT_{42}	—	February 28, 2008	Kitt Peak	Spacewatch	·	970 m	MPC · JPL
851720	2008 DQ_{51}	—	December 31, 2007	Mount Lemmon	Mount Lemmon Survey	·	1.4 km	MPC · JPL
851721	2008 DG_{61}	—	February 7, 2008	Kitt Peak	Spacewatch	·	1.8 km	MPC · JPL
851722	2008 DV_{61}	—	February 28, 2008	Mount Lemmon	Mount Lemmon Survey	·	430 m	MPC · JPL
851723	2008 DU_{65}	—	February 28, 2008	Mount Lemmon	Mount Lemmon Survey	·	1.5 km	MPC · JPL
851724	2008 DE_{69}	—	February 29, 2008	XuYi	PMO NEO Survey Program	·	710 m	MPC · JPL
851725	2008 DX_{91}	—	April 30, 2012	Mount Lemmon	Mount Lemmon Survey	·	540 m	MPC · JPL
851726	2008 DE_{92}	—	March 7, 2017	Mount Lemmon	Mount Lemmon Survey	·	1.3 km	MPC · JPL
851727	2008 DG_{92}	—	February 28, 2008	Kitt Peak	Spacewatch	·	1.4 km	MPC · JPL
851728	2008 DL_{92}	—	February 28, 2008	Kitt Peak	Spacewatch	·	370 m	MPC · JPL
851729	2008 DQ_{92}	—	January 25, 2015	Haleakala	Pan-STARRS 1	·	580 m	MPC · JPL
851730	2008 DS_{92}	—	August 28, 2009	Kitt Peak	Spacewatch	H	330 m	MPC · JPL
851731	2008 DV_{92}	—	February 28, 2008	Kitt Peak	Spacewatch	(18466)	1.7 km	MPC · JPL
851732	2008 DZ_{93}	—	June 18, 2018	Haleakala	Pan-STARRS 1	·	1.3 km	MPC · JPL
851733	2008 DP_{94}	—	February 28, 2008	Mount Lemmon	Mount Lemmon Survey	BRA	960 m	MPC · JPL
851734	2008 DA_{95}	—	February 28, 2008	Mount Lemmon	Mount Lemmon Survey	·	1.5 km	MPC · JPL
851735	2008 DD_{95}	—	February 27, 2015	Haleakala	Pan-STARRS 1	·	460 m	MPC · JPL
851736	2008 DE_{95}	—	December 3, 2014	Haleakala	Pan-STARRS 1	PHO	630 m	MPC · JPL
851737	2008 DR_{96}	—	February 28, 2008	Kitt Peak	Spacewatch	·	500 m	MPC · JPL
851738	2008 DY_{96}	—	October 1, 2003	Kitt Peak	Spacewatch	·	470 m	MPC · JPL
851739	2008 DK_{97}	—	February 27, 2008	Mount Lemmon	Mount Lemmon Survey	·	1.6 km	MPC · JPL
851740	2008 DU_{97}	—	February 26, 2008	Kitt Peak	Spacewatch	HNS	830 m	MPC · JPL
851741	2008 DZ_{99}	—	February 26, 2008	Mount Lemmon	Mount Lemmon Survey	·	470 m	MPC · JPL
851742	2008 EA_{7}	—	March 5, 2008	Mount Lemmon	Mount Lemmon Survey	·	1.2 km	MPC · JPL
851743	2008 EC_{8}	—	February 27, 2008	Mount Lemmon	Mount Lemmon Survey	·	360 m	MPC · JPL
851744	2008 EP_{13}	—	March 1, 2008	Kitt Peak	Spacewatch	·	510 m	MPC · JPL
851745	2008 EQ_{18}	—	March 1, 2008	Mount Lemmon	Mount Lemmon Survey	·	500 m	MPC · JPL
851746	2008 EC_{36}	—	February 10, 2008	Kitt Peak	Spacewatch	·	1.6 km	MPC · JPL
851747	2008 EU_{43}	—	March 5, 2008	Mount Lemmon	Mount Lemmon Survey	·	1.7 km	MPC · JPL
851748	2008 ET_{44}	—	March 5, 2008	Kitt Peak	Spacewatch	·	1.6 km	MPC · JPL
851749	2008 ER_{49}	—	January 28, 2004	Kitt Peak	Spacewatch	·	780 m	MPC · JPL
851750	2008 EA_{56}	—	March 7, 2008	Mount Lemmon	Mount Lemmon Survey	·	1.4 km	MPC · JPL
851751	2008 EA_{58}	—	March 7, 2008	Mount Lemmon	Mount Lemmon Survey	·	520 m	MPC · JPL
851752	2008 EW_{61}	—	March 9, 2008	Mount Lemmon	Mount Lemmon Survey	·	630 m	MPC · JPL
851753	2008 EP_{65}	—	March 9, 2008	Mount Lemmon	Mount Lemmon Survey	·	540 m	MPC · JPL
851754	2008 EJ_{72}	—	February 2, 2008	Kitt Peak	Spacewatch	·	810 m	MPC · JPL
851755	2008 EL_{72}	—	March 6, 2008	Mount Lemmon	Mount Lemmon Survey	·	510 m	MPC · JPL
851756	2008 EH_{107}	—	March 6, 2008	Mount Lemmon	Mount Lemmon Survey	PHO	680 m	MPC · JPL
851757	2008 EN_{108}	—	February 8, 2008	Kitt Peak	Spacewatch	·	1.4 km	MPC · JPL
851758	2008 ET_{112}	—	March 8, 2008	Kitt Peak	Spacewatch	·	550 m	MPC · JPL
851759	2008 EP_{114}	—	March 8, 2008	Kitt Peak	Spacewatch	·	1.6 km	MPC · JPL
851760	2008 EV_{115}	—	March 8, 2008	Mount Lemmon	Mount Lemmon Survey	·	870 m	MPC · JPL
851761	2008 EO_{121}	—	March 1, 2008	Kitt Peak	Spacewatch	H	310 m	MPC · JPL
851762	2008 EV_{124}	—	February 13, 2008	Kitt Peak	Spacewatch	·	1.8 km	MPC · JPL
851763	2008 ED_{127}	—	March 10, 2008	Kitt Peak	Spacewatch	·	530 m	MPC · JPL
851764	2008 EF_{134}	—	March 11, 2008	Mount Lemmon	Mount Lemmon Survey	·	790 m	MPC · JPL
851765	2008 EW_{135}	—	March 11, 2008	Kitt Peak	Spacewatch	·	520 m	MPC · JPL
851766	2008 EW_{138}	—	February 2, 2008	Mount Lemmon	Mount Lemmon Survey	·	1.1 km	MPC · JPL
851767	2008 EO_{148}	—	March 2, 2008	Kitt Peak	Spacewatch	·	1.3 km	MPC · JPL
851768	2008 EU_{150}	—	March 4, 2008	Mount Lemmon	Mount Lemmon Survey	·	1.5 km	MPC · JPL
851769	2008 EY_{154}	—	March 11, 2008	La Silla	Vaduvescu, O., M. Birlan	615	970 m	MPC · JPL
851770	2008 EJ_{156}	—	March 1, 2008	Kitt Peak	Spacewatch	·	640 m	MPC · JPL
851771	2008 EG_{164}	—	February 12, 2008	Kitt Peak	Spacewatch	·	970 m	MPC · JPL
851772	2008 EL_{164}	—	March 11, 2008	Mount Lemmon	Mount Lemmon Survey	H	330 m	MPC · JPL
851773	2008 EY_{167}	—	March 10, 2008	Kitt Peak	Spacewatch	·	860 m	MPC · JPL
851774	2008 EB_{172}	—	March 1, 2008	Kitt Peak	Spacewatch	·	900 m	MPC · JPL
851775	2008 EM_{174}	—	October 12, 2010	Mount Lemmon	Mount Lemmon Survey	·	840 m	MPC · JPL
851776	2008 ER_{174}	—	March 10, 2008	Kitt Peak	Spacewatch	·	510 m	MPC · JPL
851777	2008 EQ_{177}	—	September 28, 2006	Kitt Peak	Spacewatch	·	1.2 km	MPC · JPL
851778	2008 EZ_{178}	—	September 18, 2011	Mount Lemmon	Mount Lemmon Survey	TIR	1.7 km	MPC · JPL
851779	2008 EH_{180}	—	March 10, 2008	Kitt Peak	Spacewatch	·	800 m	MPC · JPL
851780	2008 EL_{180}	—	March 10, 2008	Mount Lemmon	Mount Lemmon Survey	JUN	600 m	MPC · JPL
851781	2008 EK_{182}	—	March 15, 2008	Mount Lemmon	Mount Lemmon Survey	·	960 m	MPC · JPL
851782	2008 EV_{182}	—	August 31, 2014	Haleakala	Pan-STARRS 1	·	1.1 km	MPC · JPL
851783	2008 EB_{184}	—	February 24, 2017	Haleakala	Pan-STARRS 1	·	1.3 km	MPC · JPL
851784	2008 EB_{185}	—	March 10, 2008	Kitt Peak	Spacewatch	NYS	800 m	MPC · JPL
851785	2008 EF_{185}	—	June 20, 2015	Haleakala	Pan-STARRS 1	·	500 m	MPC · JPL
851786	2008 EO_{185}	—	July 30, 2017	Haleakala	Pan-STARRS 1	H	390 m	MPC · JPL
851787	2008 EM_{187}	—	March 9, 2008	Kitt Peak	Spacewatch	NYS	780 m	MPC · JPL
851788	2008 EO_{187}	—	March 15, 2008	Mount Lemmon	Mount Lemmon Survey	·	820 m	MPC · JPL
851789	2008 EG_{188}	—	March 11, 2008	Kitt Peak	Spacewatch	·	520 m	MPC · JPL
851790	2008 EO_{188}	—	January 27, 2012	Mount Lemmon	Mount Lemmon Survey	(5)	820 m	MPC · JPL
851791	2008 EY_{188}	—	March 8, 2008	Mount Lemmon	Mount Lemmon Survey	·	1.2 km	MPC · JPL
851792	2008 EQ_{191}	—	March 12, 2008	Kitt Peak	Spacewatch	·	670 m	MPC · JPL
851793	2008 EJ_{192}	—	March 6, 2008	Mount Lemmon	Mount Lemmon Survey	·	1.3 km	MPC · JPL
851794	2008 EL_{192}	—	March 10, 2008	Kitt Peak	Spacewatch	·	1.4 km	MPC · JPL
851795	2008 EN_{192}	—	March 11, 2008	Kitt Peak	Spacewatch	·	510 m	MPC · JPL
851796	2008 EQ_{193}	—	March 1, 2008	Kitt Peak	Spacewatch	·	1.0 km	MPC · JPL
851797	2008 EG_{194}	—	March 8, 2008	Mount Lemmon	Mount Lemmon Survey	·	1.4 km	MPC · JPL
851798	2008 EG_{195}	—	March 10, 2008	Kitt Peak	Spacewatch	MRX	800 m	MPC · JPL
851799	2008 EG_{196}	—	March 5, 2008	Kitt Peak	Spacewatch	H	380 m	MPC · JPL
851800	2008 EH_{196}	—	March 1, 2008	Kitt Peak	Spacewatch	H	340 m	MPC · JPL

== 851801–851900 ==
back to top

Designation			Discovery			Properties		Ref
Permanent	Provisional	Named after	Date	Site	Discoverer(s)	Category	Diam.	Ref
851801	2008 EY_{196}	—	March 11, 2008	Mount Lemmon	Mount Lemmon Survey	H	350 m	MPC · JPL
851802	2008 EQ_{197}	—	March 13, 2008	Kitt Peak	Spacewatch	MAS	450 m	MPC · JPL
851803	2008 EF_{199}	—	March 6, 2008	Mount Lemmon	Mount Lemmon Survey	·	460 m	MPC · JPL
851804	2008 FX_{8}	—	March 26, 2008	Kitt Peak	Spacewatch	NYS	680 m	MPC · JPL
851805	2008 FJ_{16}	—	March 27, 2008	Kitt Peak	Spacewatch	·	1.6 km	MPC · JPL
851806	2008 FN_{17}	—	March 27, 2008	Kitt Peak	Spacewatch	KOR	1.2 km	MPC · JPL
851807	2008 FZ_{18}	—	April 14, 2001	Kitt Peak	Spacewatch	NYS	700 m	MPC · JPL
851808	2008 FR_{19}	—	March 10, 2008	Mount Lemmon	Mount Lemmon Survey	H	290 m	MPC · JPL
851809	2008 FH_{22}	—	March 27, 2008	Kitt Peak	Spacewatch	(2076)	570 m	MPC · JPL
851810	2008 FT_{22}	—	March 27, 2008	Kitt Peak	Spacewatch	·	850 m	MPC · JPL
851811	2008 FM_{29}	—	February 26, 2008	Mount Lemmon	Mount Lemmon Survey	NYS	780 m	MPC · JPL
851812	2008 FH_{32}	—	February 7, 2008	Kitt Peak	Spacewatch	·	470 m	MPC · JPL
851813	2008 FW_{37}	—	March 28, 2008	Kitt Peak	Spacewatch	·	800 m	MPC · JPL
851814	2008 FP_{42}	—	March 28, 2008	Mount Lemmon	Mount Lemmon Survey	·	670 m	MPC · JPL
851815	2008 FC_{45}	—	February 28, 2008	Mount Lemmon	Mount Lemmon Survey	·	1.5 km	MPC · JPL
851816	2008 FQ_{48}	—	March 28, 2008	Mount Lemmon	Mount Lemmon Survey	·	420 m	MPC · JPL
851817	2008 FB_{52}	—	March 28, 2008	Mount Lemmon	Mount Lemmon Survey	MAS	480 m	MPC · JPL
851818	2008 FG_{53}	—	March 28, 2008	Mount Lemmon	Mount Lemmon Survey	·	560 m	MPC · JPL
851819	2008 FE_{54}	—	March 28, 2008	Mount Lemmon	Mount Lemmon Survey	·	540 m	MPC · JPL
851820	2008 FK_{54}	—	February 13, 2008	Mount Lemmon	Mount Lemmon Survey	·	1.5 km	MPC · JPL
851821	2008 FM_{55}	—	February 28, 2008	Kitt Peak	Spacewatch	KON	1.5 km	MPC · JPL
851822	2008 FR_{56}	—	March 28, 2008	Mount Lemmon	Mount Lemmon Survey	MAS	520 m	MPC · JPL
851823	2008 FW_{59}	—	March 12, 2008	Kitt Peak	Spacewatch	·	1.7 km	MPC · JPL
851824	2008 FM_{64}	—	February 13, 2008	Mount Lemmon	Mount Lemmon Survey	·	930 m	MPC · JPL
851825	2008 FG_{67}	—	March 28, 2008	Kitt Peak	Spacewatch	·	1.2 km	MPC · JPL
851826	2008 FL_{69}	—	March 28, 2008	Mount Lemmon	Mount Lemmon Survey	·	690 m	MPC · JPL
851827	2008 FG_{74}	—	March 31, 2008	Mount Lemmon	Mount Lemmon Survey	MAR	860 m	MPC · JPL
851828	2008 FP_{79}	—	March 1, 2008	Kitt Peak	Spacewatch	·	480 m	MPC · JPL
851829	2008 FZ_{79}	—	March 27, 2008	Mount Lemmon	Mount Lemmon Survey	·	1.5 km	MPC · JPL
851830	2008 FL_{84}	—	February 28, 2008	Mount Lemmon	Mount Lemmon Survey	MIS	2.0 km	MPC · JPL
851831	2008 FU_{113}	—	March 31, 2008	Kitt Peak	Spacewatch	·	790 m	MPC · JPL
851832	2008 FX_{116}	—	March 31, 2008	Kitt Peak	Spacewatch	·	1.6 km	MPC · JPL
851833	2008 FK_{120}	—	March 31, 2008	Mount Lemmon	Mount Lemmon Survey	·	1.4 km	MPC · JPL
851834	2008 FH_{129}	—	March 29, 2008	Kitt Peak	Spacewatch	EUN	950 m	MPC · JPL
851835	2008 FT_{134}	—	March 30, 2008	Kitt Peak	Spacewatch	·	480 m	MPC · JPL
851836	2008 FV_{139}	—	March 31, 2008	Mount Lemmon	Mount Lemmon Survey	H	370 m	MPC · JPL
851837	2008 FB_{141}	—	March 31, 2008	Kitt Peak	Spacewatch	V	370 m	MPC · JPL
851838	2008 FQ_{141}	—	March 31, 2008	Kitt Peak	Spacewatch	·	1.5 km	MPC · JPL
851839	2008 FN_{143}	—	March 31, 2008	Kitt Peak	Spacewatch	·	680 m	MPC · JPL
851840	2008 FP_{143}	—	March 31, 2008	Mount Lemmon	Mount Lemmon Survey	·	1.5 km	MPC · JPL
851841	2008 FR_{144}	—	April 23, 2015	Haleakala	Pan-STARRS 1	·	420 m	MPC · JPL
851842	2008 FU_{145}	—	March 27, 2008	Kitt Peak	Spacewatch	·	510 m	MPC · JPL
851843	2008 FY_{145}	—	March 27, 2008	Mount Lemmon	Mount Lemmon Survey	·	880 m	MPC · JPL
851844	2008 FA_{146}	—	March 28, 2008	Kitt Peak	Spacewatch	·	1.4 km	MPC · JPL
851845	2008 FZ_{146}	—	March 31, 2008	Kitt Peak	Spacewatch	·	470 m	MPC · JPL
851846	2008 FU_{148}	—	March 28, 2008	Mount Lemmon	Mount Lemmon Survey	·	2.0 km	MPC · JPL
851847	2008 GW_{7}	—	April 1, 2008	Kitt Peak	Spacewatch	(2076)	440 m	MPC · JPL
851848	2008 GE_{10}	—	April 1, 2008	Kitt Peak	Spacewatch	H	360 m	MPC · JPL
851849	2008 GU_{24}	—	April 1, 2008	Mount Lemmon	Mount Lemmon Survey	·	690 m	MPC · JPL
851850	2008 GX_{30}	—	February 28, 2008	Kitt Peak	Spacewatch	MAS	630 m	MPC · JPL
851851	2008 GY_{30}	—	March 27, 2008	Mount Lemmon	Mount Lemmon Survey	·	630 m	MPC · JPL
851852	2008 GN_{33}	—	April 3, 2008	Mount Lemmon	Mount Lemmon Survey	H	310 m	MPC · JPL
851853	2008 GO_{44}	—	April 4, 2008	Mount Lemmon	Mount Lemmon Survey	·	1.5 km	MPC · JPL
851854	2008 GF_{45}	—	April 4, 2008	Kitt Peak	Spacewatch	·	460 m	MPC · JPL
851855	2008 GL_{46}	—	April 4, 2008	Kitt Peak	Spacewatch	·	1.6 km	MPC · JPL
851856	2008 GY_{54}	—	April 5, 2008	Mount Lemmon	Mount Lemmon Survey	·	1.5 km	MPC · JPL
851857	2008 GX_{55}	—	April 5, 2008	Mount Lemmon	Mount Lemmon Survey	·	1.3 km	MPC · JPL
851858	2008 GN_{59}	—	March 10, 2008	Kitt Peak	Spacewatch	·	520 m	MPC · JPL
851859	2008 GE_{63}	—	March 4, 2008	Mount Lemmon	Mount Lemmon Survey	·	480 m	MPC · JPL
851860	2008 GZ_{65}	—	April 6, 2008	Mount Lemmon	Mount Lemmon Survey	·	1.1 km	MPC · JPL
851861	2008 GV_{66}	—	March 29, 2008	Mount Lemmon	Mount Lemmon Survey	·	890 m	MPC · JPL
851862	2008 GD_{85}	—	April 8, 2008	Mount Lemmon	Mount Lemmon Survey	EOS	1.4 km	MPC · JPL
851863	2008 GS_{92}	—	April 6, 2008	Mount Lemmon	Mount Lemmon Survey	·	560 m	MPC · JPL
851864	2008 GN_{96}	—	April 8, 2008	Kitt Peak	Spacewatch	·	1.1 km	MPC · JPL
851865	2008 GD_{100}	—	April 1, 2008	Kitt Peak	Spacewatch	·	810 m	MPC · JPL
851866	2008 GU_{108}	—	January 16, 2008	Mount Lemmon	Mount Lemmon Survey	H	430 m	MPC · JPL
851867	2008 GO_{109}	—	April 13, 2008	Mount Lemmon	Mount Lemmon Survey	·	1.4 km	MPC · JPL
851868	2008 GQ_{116}	—	April 11, 2008	Mount Lemmon	Mount Lemmon Survey	·	590 m	MPC · JPL
851869	2008 GD_{118}	—	April 11, 2008	Mount Lemmon	Mount Lemmon Survey	·	1.2 km	MPC · JPL
851870	2008 GX_{121}	—	March 31, 2008	Kitt Peak	Spacewatch	·	740 m	MPC · JPL
851871	2008 GG_{123}	—	April 13, 2008	Kitt Peak	Spacewatch	PHO	760 m	MPC · JPL
851872	2008 GX_{124}	—	March 11, 2008	Mount Lemmon	Mount Lemmon Survey	·	460 m	MPC · JPL
851873	2008 GB_{139}	—	April 1, 2008	Mount Lemmon	Mount Lemmon Survey	L5	6.5 km	MPC · JPL
851874	2008 GF_{145}	—	April 6, 2008	Socorro	LINEAR	·	950 m	MPC · JPL
851875	2008 GR_{146}	—	April 14, 2008	Mount Lemmon	Mount Lemmon Survey	·	500 m	MPC · JPL
851876	2008 GC_{148}	—	April 15, 2018	Mount Lemmon	Mount Lemmon Survey	·	560 m	MPC · JPL
851877	2008 GU_{150}	—	April 5, 2008	Mount Lemmon	Mount Lemmon Survey	H	410 m	MPC · JPL
851878	2008 GS_{154}	—	April 3, 2008	Kitt Peak	Spacewatch	H	300 m	MPC · JPL
851879	2008 GY_{154}	—	March 1, 1998	Kitt Peak	Spacewatch	·	1.5 km	MPC · JPL
851880	2008 GD_{155}	—	April 23, 2015	Haleakala	Pan-STARRS 1	·	520 m	MPC · JPL
851881	2008 GM_{156}	—	January 19, 2012	Haleakala	Pan-STARRS 1	·	920 m	MPC · JPL
851882	2008 GG_{157}	—	April 14, 2008	Mount Lemmon	Mount Lemmon Survey	H	430 m	MPC · JPL
851883	2008 GK_{159}	—	April 12, 2008	Mount Lemmon	Mount Lemmon Survey	·	2.2 km	MPC · JPL
851884	2008 GP_{159}	—	September 25, 2009	Kitt Peak	Spacewatch	NYS	650 m	MPC · JPL
851885	2008 GH_{160}	—	April 11, 2008	Mount Lemmon	Mount Lemmon Survey	·	800 m	MPC · JPL
851886	2008 GU_{160}	—	March 11, 2015	Kitt Peak	Spacewatch	·	740 m	MPC · JPL
851887	2008 GK_{161}	—	February 27, 2015	Haleakala	Pan-STARRS 1	MAS	570 m	MPC · JPL
851888	2008 GX_{161}	—	November 8, 2010	Mount Lemmon	Mount Lemmon Survey	·	930 m	MPC · JPL
851889	2008 GC_{162}	—	February 16, 2015	Haleakala	Pan-STARRS 1	·	630 m	MPC · JPL
851890	2008 GH_{162}	—	April 4, 2008	Mount Lemmon	Mount Lemmon Survey	·	480 m	MPC · JPL
851891	2008 GK_{162}	—	March 21, 2017	Haleakala	Pan-STARRS 1	·	1.4 km	MPC · JPL
851892	2008 GQ_{163}	—	March 6, 2013	Haleakala	Pan-STARRS 1	·	1.5 km	MPC · JPL
851893	2008 GS_{165}	—	August 17, 2012	Haleakala	Pan-STARRS 1	·	390 m	MPC · JPL
851894	2008 GU_{165}	—	November 3, 2015	Mount Lemmon	Mount Lemmon Survey	·	1.1 km	MPC · JPL
851895	2008 GO_{166}	—	August 21, 2014	Haleakala	Pan-STARRS 1	·	1.3 km	MPC · JPL
851896	2008 GW_{166}	—	April 6, 2008	Kitt Peak	Spacewatch	·	1.6 km	MPC · JPL
851897	2008 GR_{169}	—	April 13, 2008	Kitt Peak	Spacewatch	·	440 m	MPC · JPL
851898	2008 GK_{170}	—	April 5, 2008	Mount Lemmon	Mount Lemmon Survey	MAS	530 m	MPC · JPL
851899	2008 GZ_{170}	—	April 9, 2008	Kitt Peak	Spacewatch	·	780 m	MPC · JPL
851900	2008 GF_{173}	—	April 5, 2008	Kitt Peak	Spacewatch	·	480 m	MPC · JPL

== 851901–852000 ==
back to top

Designation			Discovery			Properties		Ref
Permanent	Provisional	Named after	Date	Site	Discoverer(s)	Category	Diam.	Ref
851901	2008 GV_{175}	—	April 3, 2008	Mount Lemmon	Mount Lemmon Survey	·	460 m	MPC · JPL
851902	2008 GJ_{176}	—	April 1, 2008	Mount Lemmon	Mount Lemmon Survey	·	930 m	MPC · JPL
851903	2008 GQ_{176}	—	April 1, 2008	Mount Lemmon	Mount Lemmon Survey	EOS	1.5 km	MPC · JPL
851904	2008 GZ_{177}	—	April 5, 2008	Kitt Peak	Spacewatch	PHO	580 m	MPC · JPL
851905	2008 GB_{179}	—	April 1, 2008	Kitt Peak	Spacewatch	·	930 m	MPC · JPL
851906	2008 GB_{180}	—	April 14, 2008	Kitt Peak	Spacewatch	TIR	2.0 km	MPC · JPL
851907	2008 GL_{180}	—	April 4, 2008	Kitt Peak	Spacewatch	·	1.9 km	MPC · JPL
851908	2008 HJ_{11}	—	April 24, 2008	Kitt Peak	Spacewatch	·	850 m	MPC · JPL
851909	2008 HR_{16}	—	April 6, 2008	Kitt Peak	Spacewatch	·	530 m	MPC · JPL
851910	2008 HN_{25}	—	March 30, 2008	Kitt Peak	Spacewatch	·	450 m	MPC · JPL
851911	2008 HZ_{26}	—	April 15, 2008	Kitt Peak	Spacewatch	·	800 m	MPC · JPL
851912	2008 HO_{27}	—	April 27, 2008	Mount Lemmon	Mount Lemmon Survey	·	490 m	MPC · JPL
851913	2008 HH_{37}	—	April 30, 2008	Mount Lemmon	Mount Lemmon Survey	T_{j} (2.99)	1.8 km	MPC · JPL
851914	2008 HF_{38}	—	March 8, 2008	Mount Lemmon	Mount Lemmon Survey	·	850 m	MPC · JPL
851915	2008 HA_{41}	—	March 29, 2008	Kitt Peak	Spacewatch	·	490 m	MPC · JPL
851916	2008 HA_{44}	—	April 27, 2008	Mount Lemmon	Mount Lemmon Survey	·	1.3 km	MPC · JPL
851917	2008 HW_{48}	—	April 7, 2008	Mount Lemmon	Mount Lemmon Survey	·	840 m	MPC · JPL
851918	2008 HU_{49}	—	April 29, 2008	Kitt Peak	Spacewatch	·	870 m	MPC · JPL
851919	2008 HS_{51}	—	April 29, 2008	Kitt Peak	Spacewatch	·	710 m	MPC · JPL
851920	2008 HP_{53}	—	April 29, 2008	Kitt Peak	Spacewatch	H	340 m	MPC · JPL
851921	2008 HX_{64}	—	April 14, 2008	Mount Lemmon	Mount Lemmon Survey	PHO	620 m	MPC · JPL
851922	2008 HO_{67}	—	April 29, 2008	Kitt Peak	Spacewatch	BRG	900 m	MPC · JPL
851923	2008 HS_{72}	—	August 2, 2016	Haleakala	Pan-STARRS 1	·	710 m	MPC · JPL
851924	2008 HU_{72}	—	October 18, 2017	Cerro Paranal	Gaia Ground Based Optical Tracking	H	360 m	MPC · JPL
851925	2008 HW_{72}	—	April 28, 2008	Kitt Peak	Spacewatch	HNS	820 m	MPC · JPL
851926	2008 HT_{74}	—	April 1, 2008	Kitt Peak	Spacewatch	NYS	750 m	MPC · JPL
851927	2008 HJ_{75}	—	October 14, 2012	Mount Lemmon	Mount Lemmon Survey	·	460 m	MPC · JPL
851928	2008 HF_{76}	—	August 11, 2015	Haleakala	Pan-STARRS 1	·	450 m	MPC · JPL
851929	2008 HW_{76}	—	December 11, 2013	Haleakala	Pan-STARRS 1	·	520 m	MPC · JPL
851930	2008 HK_{77}	—	April 26, 2008	Kitt Peak	Spacewatch	EUN	820 m	MPC · JPL
851931	2008 HG_{79}	—	April 29, 2008	Mount Lemmon	Mount Lemmon Survey	·	780 m	MPC · JPL
851932	2008 JN_{2}	—	April 14, 2008	Mount Lemmon	Mount Lemmon Survey	·	2.1 km	MPC · JPL
851933	2008 JT_{19}	—	May 10, 2005	Mount Lemmon	Mount Lemmon Survey	AMO	370 m	MPC · JPL
851934	2008 JB_{22}	—	May 6, 2008	Kitt Peak	Spacewatch	·	1.9 km	MPC · JPL
851935	2008 JX_{26}	—	April 14, 2008	Kitt Peak	Spacewatch	·	420 m	MPC · JPL
851936	2008 JS_{32}	—	May 7, 2008	Kitt Peak	Spacewatch	·	460 m	MPC · JPL
851937	2008 JM_{44}	—	October 11, 2012	Haleakala	Pan-STARRS 1	·	440 m	MPC · JPL
851938	2008 JF_{45}	—	May 3, 2008	Kitt Peak	Spacewatch	V	440 m	MPC · JPL
851939	2008 JN_{45}	—	May 3, 2008	Mount Lemmon	Mount Lemmon Survey	·	540 m	MPC · JPL
851940	2008 JV_{51}	—	May 3, 2008	Kitt Peak	Spacewatch	·	750 m	MPC · JPL
851941	2008 JR_{54}	—	May 2, 2008	Kitt Peak	Spacewatch	·	550 m	MPC · JPL
851942	2008 KH	—	May 26, 2008	Mount Lemmon	Mount Lemmon Survey	T_{j} (2.96)	2.4 km	MPC · JPL
851943	2008 KG_{5}	—	May 27, 2008	Kitt Peak	Spacewatch	·	450 m	MPC · JPL
851944	2008 KO_{12}	—	May 26, 2008	Kitt Peak	Spacewatch	·	1.7 km	MPC · JPL
851945	2008 KP_{14}	—	May 14, 2008	Kitt Peak	Spacewatch	·	1.3 km	MPC · JPL
851946	2008 KY_{15}	—	May 27, 2008	Kitt Peak	Spacewatch	·	810 m	MPC · JPL
851947	2008 KY_{21}	—	May 28, 2008	Kitt Peak	Spacewatch	EOS	1.3 km	MPC · JPL
851948	2008 KJ_{22}	—	May 28, 2008	Mount Lemmon	Mount Lemmon Survey	·	980 m	MPC · JPL
851949	2008 KB_{25}	—	May 29, 2008	Kitt Peak	Spacewatch	·	1.8 km	MPC · JPL
851950	2008 KF_{32}	—	May 29, 2008	Mount Lemmon	Mount Lemmon Survey	·	1.8 km	MPC · JPL
851951	2008 KV_{40}	—	May 6, 2008	Mount Lemmon	Mount Lemmon Survey	H	410 m	MPC · JPL
851952	2008 KB_{44}	—	May 29, 2008	Kitt Peak	Spacewatch	·	1.5 km	MPC · JPL
851953	2008 KG_{46}	—	July 8, 2014	Haleakala	Pan-STARRS 1	·	1.7 km	MPC · JPL
851954	2008 KH_{46}	—	May 21, 2015	Haleakala	Pan-STARRS 1	V	390 m	MPC · JPL
851955	2008 KQ_{46}	—	January 12, 2018	Haleakala	Pan-STARRS 1	·	2.0 km	MPC · JPL
851956	2008 KS_{46}	—	April 29, 2008	Mount Lemmon	Mount Lemmon Survey	H	310 m	MPC · JPL
851957	2008 KM_{47}	—	July 25, 2015	Haleakala	Pan-STARRS 1	·	2.2 km	MPC · JPL
851958	2008 KS_{49}	—	May 29, 2008	Mount Lemmon	Mount Lemmon Survey	·	1.2 km	MPC · JPL
851959	2008 LK_{1}	—	April 15, 2008	Mount Lemmon	Mount Lemmon Survey	·	1.7 km	MPC · JPL
851960	2008 LJ_{4}	—	June 2, 2008	Mount Lemmon	Mount Lemmon Survey	·	470 m	MPC · JPL
851961	2008 LY_{6}	—	June 3, 2008	Kitt Peak	Spacewatch	·	1.9 km	MPC · JPL
851962	2008 LS_{7}	—	June 3, 2008	Mount Lemmon	Mount Lemmon Survey	·	670 m	MPC · JPL
851963	2008 LJ_{8}	—	May 5, 2008	Kitt Peak	Spacewatch	PHO	520 m	MPC · JPL
851964	2008 LE_{18}	—	April 29, 2008	Mount Lemmon	Mount Lemmon Survey	·	710 m	MPC · JPL
851965	2008 LN_{21}	—	June 7, 2008	Kitt Peak	Spacewatch	·	570 m	MPC · JPL
851966	2008 MQ_{5}	—	December 14, 2010	Mount Lemmon	Mount Lemmon Survey	·	760 m	MPC · JPL
851967	2008 NL_{3}	—	July 12, 2008	Pla D'Arguines	R. Ferrando, Ferrando, M.	·	1.2 km	MPC · JPL
851968	2008 NY_{5}	—	July 2, 2008	Kitt Peak	Spacewatch	·	790 m	MPC · JPL
851969	2008 OF_{1}	—	May 14, 2008	Mount Lemmon	Mount Lemmon Survey	·	2.2 km	MPC · JPL
851970	2008 OL_{2}	—	May 28, 2008	Mount Lemmon	Mount Lemmon Survey	·	660 m	MPC · JPL
851971	2008 ON_{9}	—	July 29, 2008	Mount Lemmon	Mount Lemmon Survey	·	570 m	MPC · JPL
851972	2008 OR_{10}	—	July 29, 2008	Charleston	R. Holmes, H. Devore	·	1.9 km	MPC · JPL
851973	2008 OX_{24}	—	July 30, 2008	Mount Lemmon	Mount Lemmon Survey	·	710 m	MPC · JPL
851974	2008 OD_{26}	—	December 4, 2013	Haleakala	Pan-STARRS 1	·	1.6 km	MPC · JPL
851975	2008 OC_{28}	—	October 4, 2014	Kitt Peak	Spacewatch	·	1.9 km	MPC · JPL
851976	2008 OG_{28}	—	October 8, 2012	Haleakala	Pan-STARRS 1	V	440 m	MPC · JPL
851977	2008 ON_{28}	—	October 30, 2014	Mount Lemmon	Mount Lemmon Survey	·	1.1 km	MPC · JPL
851978	2008 OQ_{29}	—	July 30, 2008	Mount Lemmon	Mount Lemmon Survey	·	2.0 km	MPC · JPL
851979	2008 OU_{29}	—	October 19, 2012	Mount Lemmon	Mount Lemmon Survey	·	670 m	MPC · JPL
851980	2008 OW_{29}	—	January 19, 2012	Haleakala	Pan-STARRS 1	·	2.5 km	MPC · JPL
851981	2008 OX_{29}	—	October 8, 2012	Haleakala	Pan-STARRS 1	V	530 m	MPC · JPL
851982	2008 OJ_{30}	—	July 29, 2008	Kitt Peak	Spacewatch	VER	1.7 km	MPC · JPL
851983	2008 OA_{31}	—	October 28, 2014	Haleakala	Pan-STARRS 1	EOS	1.2 km	MPC · JPL
851984	2008 OD_{31}	—	September 2, 2014	Haleakala	Pan-STARRS 1	·	1.8 km	MPC · JPL
851985	2008 OG_{31}	—	July 30, 2008	Mount Lemmon	Mount Lemmon Survey	·	470 m	MPC · JPL
851986	2008 OG_{32}	—	July 30, 2008	Kitt Peak	Spacewatch	·	520 m	MPC · JPL
851987	2008 OO_{32}	—	July 29, 2008	Mount Lemmon	Mount Lemmon Survey	·	480 m	MPC · JPL
851988	2008 OZ_{32}	—	July 29, 2008	Kitt Peak	Spacewatch	·	810 m	MPC · JPL
851989	2008 OA_{33}	—	July 30, 2008	Mount Lemmon	Mount Lemmon Survey	·	580 m	MPC · JPL
851990	2008 OE_{33}	—	July 29, 2008	Mount Lemmon	Mount Lemmon Survey	·	1.1 km	MPC · JPL
851991	2008 OG_{33}	—	July 29, 2008	Mount Lemmon	Mount Lemmon Survey	EUN	730 m	MPC · JPL
851992	2008 OK_{33}	—	July 31, 2008	Anderson Mesa	Wasserman, L. H.	(1118)	2.1 km	MPC · JPL
851993	2008 OM_{33}	—	July 30, 2008	Mount Lemmon	Mount Lemmon Survey	NYS	760 m	MPC · JPL
851994	2008 PZ_{1}	—	August 3, 2008	La Sagra	OAM	·	520 m	MPC · JPL
851995	2008 PC_{5}	—	August 4, 2008	La Sagra	OAM	·	1.6 km	MPC · JPL
851996	2008 PL_{5}	—	August 5, 2008	Siding Spring	SSS	·	1.6 km	MPC · JPL
851997	2008 PT_{5}	—	July 30, 2008	Mount Lemmon	Mount Lemmon Survey	·	470 m	MPC · JPL
851998	2008 PE_{8}	—	July 26, 2008	Siding Spring	SSS	·	880 m	MPC · JPL
851999	2008 PL_{14}	—	July 29, 2008	Kitt Peak	Spacewatch	·	1.4 km	MPC · JPL
852000	2008 PV_{14}	—	August 10, 2008	La Sagra	OAM	·	1.1 km	MPC · JPL

back to top
