= 5477 Holmes =

Hungaria asteroid and binary system

Discovery
- Discovered by: E. F. Helin
- Discovery site: Palomar Obs.
- Discovery date: 27 October 1989

Designations
- Named after: Robert Holmes (American astronomer)
- Alternative designations: 1989 UH_{2}
- Minor planet category: main-belt · (inner); Hungaria

Orbital characteristics
- Epoch 23 March 2018 (JD 2458200.5)
- Uncertainty parameter 0
- Observation arc: 27.60 yr (10,082 d)
- Aphelion: 2.0613 AU
- Perihelion: 1.7732 AU
- Semi-major axis: 1.9172 AU
- Eccentricity: 0.0751
- Orbital period (sidereal): 2.65 yr (970 d)
- Mean anomaly: 295.23°
- Mean motion: 0° 22^{m} 16.68^{s} / day
- Inclination: 22.552°
- Longitude of ascending node: 49.112°
- Argument of perihelion: 290.30°
- Known satellites: 1 (D: 1.09 km P: 24.4 h)

Physical characteristics
- Mean diameter: 2.95±0.13 km (derived); 3.147±0.137 km 3.21 km (taken); 3.215 km
- Synodic rotation period: 2.9932±0.0002 h (Note: Lightcurve plot of 5477 Holmes, Palmer Divide Observatory, Brian D. Warner (2012). Rotation period 2.9932±0.0002 hours with a brightness amplitude of 0.10±0.01 mag. The second plot for the orbital period of the satellite gives a period of 24.37±0.01 hours. Quality code is 3. Summary figures at the LCDB.); 2.9940±0.0002 h 2.99401±0.00007 h 2.99408±0.00007 h 2.9943±0.0002 h
- Geometric albedo: 0.2849; 0.310±0.038
- Spectral type: E (assumed)
- Absolute magnitude (H): 13.99±0.03 (R); 14.0; 14.26±0.54; 14.4; 14.445

5477 Holmes, provisional designation 1989 UH_{2}, is a Hungaria asteroid and binary system from the innermost regions of the asteroid belt, approximately 3 kilometers (2 miles) in diameter. It was discovered on 27 October 1989, by American astronomer Eleanor Helin at the Palomar Observatory in California. The presumed E-type asteroid is likely spherical in shape and has a short rotation period of 2.99 hours. It was named for American amateur astronomer Robert Holmes. The discovery of its 1-kilometer-sized minor-planet moon was announced in November 2005.

== Orbit and classification ==
Holmes is a core member of the Hungaria family (003), a large family of bright asteroids that forms the innermost dense concentration of asteroids in the Solar System, as the Mars-crosser and near-Earth populations are much more sparse. The family is part of the larger dynamical group with the same name. It orbits the Sun in the innermost asteroid belt at a distance of 1.8–2.1 AU once every 2 years and 8 months (970 days; semi-major axis of 1.92 AU). Its orbit has an eccentricity of 0.08 and an inclination of 23° with respect to the ecliptic. The body's observation arc begins with its official discovery observation at Palomar in October 1989.

== Physical characteristics ==
Holmes is an assumed E-type asteroid, which agrees with the overall spectral type for members of the Hungaria family.

=== Rotation period ===
Since 2005, several rotational lightcurves of Holmes have been obtained from photometric observations by Brian Warner and Petr Pravec in collaboration with other astronomers. Analysis of the best-rated lightcurve gave a well-defined rotation period of 2.9940 hours with a consolidated brightness amplitude between 0.10 and 0.12 magnitude, which indicates that the body has a nearly spherical shape (U=3). The asteroid's short period is near that of a fast rotator.

=== Diameter and albedo ===
According to the survey carried out by the NEOWISE mission of NASA's Wide-field Infrared Survey Explorer (WISE), Holmes measures 3.147 kilometers in diameter and its surface has an albedo of 0.31, while the Collaborative Asteroid Lightcurve Link adopts Petr Pravec's revised WISE-data, that is, an albedo of 0.2849 and a diameter of 3.21 kilometers based on an absolute magnitude of 14.445. Johnston's Archive derives a diameter of 2.95 and 3.15 kilometers for the primary only and for the combined system, respectively.

=== Satellite ===
The photometric observations obtained by Brian Warner and collaborators during 2–12 November 2005, revealed that Holmes is a synchronous binary asteroid with a minor-planet moon orbiting it every 24.4 hours at an estimated average distance of 6.7 km. The discovery was announced immediately on 15 November 2005. The mutual occultation events indicated the presence of a satellite 37% the size of its primary, which translates into an estimated diameter of 1.09–1.19 kilometers depending on the underlying size estimate of the primary.

== Naming ==
This minor planet was named after American amateur astronomer Robert E. Holmes Jr (born 1956), who directs the Astronomical Research Observatory (H21) in Westfield, Illinois. The official naming citation was suggested by Sergio Foglia and published by the Minor Planet Center on 18 February 2011 (M.P.C. 73983).
