= Robert Holmes (astronomer) =

American astronomer

- Born: 1956 (age 69–70)
- Known for: Amateur astronomer

Robert E. Holmes Jr. (born 1956) is an American amateur astronomer and professional photographer.

In 2002, Holmes founded Astronomical Research Institute (ARI), a non-profit organization offering students observation time from telescopes installed at the Astronomical Research Observatory originally in Charleston, Illinois and later at Westfield, Illinois.

The Minor Planet Center credits him with the discovery of 13 asteroids made between 2004 and 2010, partly in collaboration with Harlan Devore and Tomáš Vorobjov. In 2008, with 24-inch (0.61 m) and 32-inch (0.81 m) robotic telescopes at his Charleston observatory that he built himself, Holmes reported 11,593 observations of asteroids and near-earth objects to the Minor Planet Center, more than any other professional or amateur observatory.

Holmes discovered comet C/2008 N1 (Holmes).

The asteroid 5477 Holmes is named for him.

== See also ==
- List of minor planet discoverers
