= List of minor planets: 688001–689000 =

The following is a partial list of minor planets, running from minor-planet number 688001 through 689000, inclusive. The primary data for this and other partial lists is based on JPL's "Small-Body Orbital Elements" and data available from the Minor Planet Center. Critical list information is also provided by the MPC, unless otherwise specified from Lowell Observatory. A detailed description of the table's columns and additional sources are given on the main page including a complete list of every page in this series, and a statistical break-up on the dynamical classification of minor planets.

Also see the summary list of all named bodies in numerical and alphabetical order, and the corresponding naming citations for the number range of this particular list. New namings may only be added to this list after official publication, as the preannouncement of names is condemned by the Working Group for Small Bodies Nomenclature of the International Astronomical Union.

Near-Earth obj.	MBA (inner)	MBA (outer)	Centaur
Mars-crosser	MBA (middle)	Jupiter trojan	Trans-Neptunian obj.
Unclassified

== 688001–688100 ==
Designation			Discovery			Properties		Ref
Permanent	Provisional	Named after	Date	Site	Discoverer(s)	Category	Diam.	Ref
688001	2012 EK_{24}	—	March 13, 2012	Mount Lemmon	Mount Lemmon Survey	·	850 m	MPC · JPL
688002	2012 EO_{24}	—	May 12, 2013	Haleakala	Pan-STARRS 1	·	2.0 km	MPC · JPL
688003	2012 EC_{25}	—	March 13, 2012	Mount Lemmon	Mount Lemmon Survey	KOR	1.1 km	MPC · JPL
688004	2012 EM_{25}	—	March 13, 2012	Mount Lemmon	Mount Lemmon Survey	·	1.5 km	MPC · JPL
688005	2012 EN_{25}	—	March 13, 2012	Mount Lemmon	Mount Lemmon Survey	3:2	4.0 km	MPC · JPL
688006	2012 ES_{26}	—	September 19, 2009	Mount Lemmon	Mount Lemmon Survey	·	2.4 km	MPC · JPL
688007	2012 EQ_{29}	—	March 13, 2012	Mount Lemmon	Mount Lemmon Survey	·	2.5 km	MPC · JPL
688008	2012 EB_{31}	—	March 14, 2012	Mount Lemmon	Mount Lemmon Survey	·	2.5 km	MPC · JPL
688009	2012 EC_{31}	—	March 15, 2012	Mount Lemmon	Mount Lemmon Survey	·	1.9 km	MPC · JPL
688010	2012 EE_{31}	—	March 4, 2012	Mount Lemmon	Mount Lemmon Survey	VER	2.0 km	MPC · JPL
688011	2012 EX_{31}	—	March 15, 2012	Mount Lemmon	Mount Lemmon Survey	·	2.1 km	MPC · JPL
688012	2012 EE_{34}	—	March 1, 2012	Mount Lemmon	Mount Lemmon Survey	·	2.2 km	MPC · JPL
688013	2012 FE_{3}	—	March 15, 2012	Mount Lemmon	Mount Lemmon Survey	·	2.5 km	MPC · JPL
688014	2012 FH_{3}	—	March 18, 2007	Kitt Peak	Spacewatch	·	2.2 km	MPC · JPL
688015	2012 FE_{7}	—	February 1, 2012	Kitt Peak	Spacewatch	·	3.0 km	MPC · JPL
688016	2012 FN_{7}	—	February 23, 2012	Mount Lemmon	Mount Lemmon Survey	·	2.2 km	MPC · JPL
688017	2012 FV_{7}	—	January 17, 2007	Kitt Peak	Spacewatch	·	1.5 km	MPC · JPL
688018	2012 FD_{9}	—	March 15, 2012	Mount Lemmon	Mount Lemmon Survey	·	2.0 km	MPC · JPL
688019	2012 FK_{9}	—	February 24, 2008	Mount Lemmon	Mount Lemmon Survey	·	760 m	MPC · JPL
688020	2012 FM_{9}	—	February 23, 2012	Mount Lemmon	Mount Lemmon Survey	·	2.3 km	MPC · JPL
688021	2012 FN_{11}	—	February 1, 2012	Mount Lemmon	Mount Lemmon Survey	·	2.4 km	MPC · JPL
688022	2012 FJ_{12}	—	February 26, 2012	Kitt Peak	Spacewatch	VER	2.3 km	MPC · JPL
688023	2012 FD_{17}	—	March 13, 2012	Mount Lemmon	Mount Lemmon Survey	·	2.2 km	MPC · JPL
688024	2012 FL_{18}	—	March 17, 2012	Mount Lemmon	Mount Lemmon Survey	VER	2.0 km	MPC · JPL
688025	2012 FQ_{19}	—	March 13, 2012	Charleston	R. Holmes	·	2.2 km	MPC · JPL
688026	2012 FR_{22}	—	August 28, 2003	Palomar	NEAT	·	2.6 km	MPC · JPL
688027	2012 FF_{23}	—	September 2, 2005	Palomar	NEAT	H	520 m	MPC · JPL
688028	2012 FA_{24}	—	November 9, 2007	Kitt Peak	Spacewatch	·	720 m	MPC · JPL
688029	2012 FV_{24}	—	July 25, 2006	Mount Lemmon	Mount Lemmon Survey	·	650 m	MPC · JPL
688030	2012 FA_{26}	—	March 21, 2012	Mount Lemmon	Mount Lemmon Survey	·	1.5 km	MPC · JPL
688031	2012 FN_{27}	—	March 22, 2012	Mount Lemmon	Mount Lemmon Survey	·	2.8 km	MPC · JPL
688032	2012 FM_{28}	—	April 12, 2008	Kitt Peak	Spacewatch	·	810 m	MPC · JPL
688033	2012 FJ_{29}	—	February 7, 2006	Kitt Peak	Spacewatch	THM	1.9 km	MPC · JPL
688034	2012 FR_{29}	—	March 23, 2012	Mount Lemmon	Mount Lemmon Survey	EOS	1.5 km	MPC · JPL
688035	2012 FU_{32}	—	February 20, 2012	Haleakala	Pan-STARRS 1	·	2.5 km	MPC · JPL
688036	2012 FH_{35}	—	February 28, 2012	Haleakala	Pan-STARRS 1	·	2.1 km	MPC · JPL
688037	2012 FS_{39}	—	March 16, 2012	Haleakala	Pan-STARRS 1	·	3.0 km	MPC · JPL
688038	2012 FK_{45}	—	September 16, 2009	Kitt Peak	Spacewatch	·	2.7 km	MPC · JPL
688039	2012 FT_{48}	—	September 21, 2003	Kitt Peak	Spacewatch	·	2.8 km	MPC · JPL
688040	2012 FC_{51}	—	March 15, 2012	Kitt Peak	Spacewatch	EOS	1.6 km	MPC · JPL
688041	2012 FN_{54}	—	September 11, 2004	Kitt Peak	Spacewatch	KOR	1.2 km	MPC · JPL
688042	2012 FO_{55}	—	February 21, 2012	Mount Lemmon	Mount Lemmon Survey	·	2.5 km	MPC · JPL
688043	2012 FO_{57}	—	November 10, 2010	Mount Lemmon	Mount Lemmon Survey	HNS	670 m	MPC · JPL
688044	2012 FS_{64}	—	September 12, 2009	Kitt Peak	Spacewatch	·	2.5 km	MPC · JPL
688045	2012 FD_{66}	—	February 28, 2012	Haleakala	Pan-STARRS 1	·	2.6 km	MPC · JPL
688046	2012 FA_{79}	—	March 16, 2012	Magdalena Ridge	Ryan, W. H., Ryan, E. V.	·	1.7 km	MPC · JPL
688047	2012 FG_{79}	—	March 16, 2012	Kitt Peak	Spacewatch	HYG	2.2 km	MPC · JPL
688048	2012 FO_{79}	—	March 16, 2012	Kitt Peak	Spacewatch	·	2.7 km	MPC · JPL
688049	2012 FC_{85}	—	January 31, 2006	Kitt Peak	Spacewatch	THM	2.3 km	MPC · JPL
688050	2012 FH_{86}	—	March 27, 2012	Mount Lemmon	Mount Lemmon Survey	·	1.0 km	MPC · JPL
688051	2012 FX_{86}	—	February 24, 2006	Mount Lemmon	Mount Lemmon Survey	·	2.4 km	MPC · JPL
688052	2012 FN_{87}	—	March 29, 2012	Haleakala	Pan-STARRS 1	plutino	139 km	MPC · JPL
688053	2012 FR_{87}	—	July 16, 2013	Haleakala	Pan-STARRS 1	T_{j} (2.92)	3.2 km	MPC · JPL
688054	2012 FU_{89}	—	March 30, 2012	Mount Lemmon	Mount Lemmon Survey	·	2.4 km	MPC · JPL
688055	2012 FY_{89}	—	December 3, 2005	Kitt Peak	Spacewatch	·	1.5 km	MPC · JPL
688056	2012 FV_{90}	—	March 17, 2012	Kitt Peak	Spacewatch	·	990 m	MPC · JPL
688057	2012 FW_{90}	—	April 2, 2016	Mount Lemmon	Mount Lemmon Survey	·	1.1 km	MPC · JPL
688058	2012 FG_{96}	—	March 17, 2012	Mount Lemmon	Mount Lemmon Survey	·	2.4 km	MPC · JPL
688059	2012 FT_{96}	—	June 22, 2017	Haleakala	Pan-STARRS 1	·	940 m	MPC · JPL
688060	2012 FM_{98}	—	March 29, 2012	Haleakala	Pan-STARRS 1	·	2.6 km	MPC · JPL
688061	2012 FL_{100}	—	March 16, 2012	Haleakala	Pan-STARRS 1	·	1.3 km	MPC · JPL
688062	2012 FP_{101}	—	March 29, 2012	Haleakala	Pan-STARRS 1	·	2.4 km	MPC · JPL
688063	2012 FC_{105}	—	March 25, 2012	Mount Lemmon	Mount Lemmon Survey	·	2.7 km	MPC · JPL
688064	2012 FG_{108}	—	March 23, 2012	Mount Lemmon	Mount Lemmon Survey	(31811)	2.1 km	MPC · JPL
688065	2012 FB_{111}	—	March 25, 2012	Mount Lemmon	Mount Lemmon Survey	·	2.4 km	MPC · JPL
688066	2012 FY_{111}	—	March 29, 2012	Mount Lemmon	Mount Lemmon Survey	·	720 m	MPC · JPL
688067	2012 GX_{1}	—	September 27, 2003	Kitt Peak	Spacewatch	·	310 m	MPC · JPL
688068	2012 GQ_{2}	—	March 24, 2006	Mount Lemmon	Mount Lemmon Survey	·	2.3 km	MPC · JPL
688069	2012 GR_{5}	—	April 25, 2007	Kitt Peak	Spacewatch	·	2.4 km	MPC · JPL
688070	2012 GQ_{9}	—	January 5, 2012	Haleakala	Pan-STARRS 1	·	2.3 km	MPC · JPL
688071	2012 GV_{10}	—	March 29, 2012	Mount Lemmon	Mount Lemmon Survey	·	2.1 km	MPC · JPL
688072	2012 GT_{19}	—	September 29, 2003	Kitt Peak	Spacewatch	EOS	1.7 km	MPC · JPL
688073	2012 GP_{23}	—	March 20, 2002	Kitt Peak	Deep Ecliptic Survey	·	1.8 km	MPC · JPL
688074	2012 GW_{25}	—	April 13, 2012	Haleakala	Pan-STARRS 1	·	2.2 km	MPC · JPL
688075	2012 GM_{26}	—	October 24, 2009	Kitt Peak	Spacewatch	·	2.9 km	MPC · JPL
688076	2012 GM_{27}	—	October 10, 2008	Mount Lemmon	Mount Lemmon Survey	·	2.9 km	MPC · JPL
688077	2012 GZ_{34}	—	April 15, 2012	Haleakala	Pan-STARRS 1	ELF	2.9 km	MPC · JPL
688078	2012 GO_{46}	—	August 29, 2014	Mount Lemmon	Mount Lemmon Survey	·	2.7 km	MPC · JPL
688079	2012 GS_{46}	—	January 3, 2017	Haleakala	Pan-STARRS 1	·	2.2 km	MPC · JPL
688080	2012 GL_{48}	—	April 1, 2012	Mount Lemmon	Mount Lemmon Survey	·	2.2 km	MPC · JPL
688081	2012 GO_{48}	—	April 15, 2012	Haleakala	Pan-STARRS 1	·	980 m	MPC · JPL
688082	2012 GS_{48}	—	April 1, 2012	Mount Lemmon	Mount Lemmon Survey	·	760 m	MPC · JPL
688083	2012 GU_{48}	—	April 13, 2012	Haleakala	Pan-STARRS 1	EOS	2.0 km	MPC · JPL
688084	2012 GM_{51}	—	April 12, 2012	Haleakala	Pan-STARRS 1	·	840 m	MPC · JPL
688085	2012 GO_{52}	—	April 14, 2012	Haleakala	Pan-STARRS 1	·	2.1 km	MPC · JPL
688086	2012 HU_{10}	—	April 20, 2012	Mount Lemmon	Mount Lemmon Survey	·	940 m	MPC · JPL
688087	2012 HV_{14}	—	April 21, 2012	Haleakala	Pan-STARRS 1	·	2.5 km	MPC · JPL
688088	2012 HW_{16}	—	April 13, 2012	Kitt Peak	Spacewatch	·	3.0 km	MPC · JPL
688089	2012 HE_{18}	—	June 17, 2005	Mount Lemmon	Mount Lemmon Survey	·	1.2 km	MPC · JPL
688090	2012 HG_{18}	—	April 21, 2012	Haleakala	Pan-STARRS 1	·	1.7 km	MPC · JPL
688091	2012 HS_{18}	—	April 21, 2012	Haleakala	Pan-STARRS 1	·	3.5 km	MPC · JPL
688092	2012 HA_{20}	—	April 24, 2012	Mount Lemmon	Mount Lemmon Survey	·	910 m	MPC · JPL
688093	2012 HZ_{22}	—	April 26, 2007	Mount Lemmon	Mount Lemmon Survey	·	1.9 km	MPC · JPL
688094	2012 HD_{26}	—	April 22, 2012	Kitt Peak	Spacewatch	·	800 m	MPC · JPL
688095	2012 HR_{29}	—	April 20, 2012	Kitt Peak	Spacewatch	·	2.6 km	MPC · JPL
688096	2012 HF_{33}	—	February 7, 2011	Mount Lemmon	Mount Lemmon Survey	EMA	2.4 km	MPC · JPL
688097	2012 HE_{37}	—	January 30, 2011	Mount Lemmon	Mount Lemmon Survey	·	2.5 km	MPC · JPL
688098	2012 HS_{46}	—	September 28, 2009	Mount Lemmon	Mount Lemmon Survey	·	3.2 km	MPC · JPL
688099	2012 HZ_{51}	—	April 20, 2012	Haleakala	Pan-STARRS 1	BRU	2.4 km	MPC · JPL
688100	2012 HZ_{64}	—	June 16, 2005	Kitt Peak	Spacewatch	·	970 m	MPC · JPL

== 688101–688200 ==
back to top

Designation			Discovery			Properties		Ref
Permanent	Provisional	Named after	Date	Site	Discoverer(s)	Category	Diam.	Ref
688101	2012 HX_{76}	—	July 4, 2005	Kitt Peak	Spacewatch	·	890 m	MPC · JPL
688102	2012 HZ_{83}	—	April 10, 2016	Haleakala	Pan-STARRS 1	HNS	770 m	MPC · JPL
688103	2012 HT_{86}	—	October 23, 2003	Apache Point	SDSS Collaboration	·	2.7 km	MPC · JPL
688104	2012 HU_{86}	—	April 22, 2012	Kitt Peak	Spacewatch	·	2.6 km	MPC · JPL
688105	2012 HQ_{88}	—	April 25, 2012	Mount Lemmon	Mount Lemmon Survey	·	2.9 km	MPC · JPL
688106	2012 HB_{89}	—	April 30, 2012	Kitt Peak	Spacewatch	·	770 m	MPC · JPL
688107	2012 HZ_{89}	—	April 30, 2012	Mount Lemmon	Mount Lemmon Survey	·	900 m	MPC · JPL
688108	2012 HB_{95}	—	July 15, 2013	Haleakala	Pan-STARRS 1	·	910 m	MPC · JPL
688109	2012 HT_{97}	—	August 28, 2013	Mount Lemmon	Mount Lemmon Survey	·	690 m	MPC · JPL
688110	2012 HJ_{100}	—	April 20, 2012	Mount Lemmon	Mount Lemmon Survey	·	940 m	MPC · JPL
688111	2012 HJ_{103}	—	April 30, 2012	Kitt Peak	Spacewatch	HNS	840 m	MPC · JPL
688112	2012 HK_{103}	—	April 27, 2012	Haleakala	Pan-STARRS 1	·	680 m	MPC · JPL
688113	2012 HA_{104}	—	April 28, 2012	Mount Lemmon	Mount Lemmon Survey	·	880 m	MPC · JPL
688114	2012 HF_{107}	—	April 29, 2012	Kitt Peak	Spacewatch	·	1.3 km	MPC · JPL
688115	2012 HX_{107}	—	April 28, 2012	Mount Lemmon	Mount Lemmon Survey	·	870 m	MPC · JPL
688116	2012 HR_{108}	—	April 24, 2012	Mount Lemmon	Mount Lemmon Survey	MAR	750 m	MPC · JPL
688117 Omizzolo	2012 HZ_{109}	Omizzolo	April 21, 2012	Mount Graham	K. Černis, R. P. Boyle	·	2.1 km	MPC · JPL
688118	2012 HN_{113}	—	April 27, 2012	Haleakala	Pan-STARRS 1	·	1.2 km	MPC · JPL
688119	2012 JL_{3}	—	April 11, 1999	Kitt Peak	Spacewatch	·	620 m	MPC · JPL
688120	2012 JC_{10}	—	May 13, 2012	Mount Lemmon	Mount Lemmon Survey	·	950 m	MPC · JPL
688121	2012 JE_{10}	—	May 13, 2012	Mount Lemmon	Mount Lemmon Survey	·	940 m	MPC · JPL
688122	2012 JK_{12}	—	November 18, 2003	Kitt Peak	Spacewatch	·	3.7 km	MPC · JPL
688123	2012 JC_{14}	—	October 12, 2009	Mount Lemmon	Mount Lemmon Survey	·	1.5 km	MPC · JPL
688124	2012 JP_{16}	—	May 15, 2012	Kitt Peak	Spacewatch	T_{j} (2.93)	3.3 km	MPC · JPL
688125	2012 JQ_{17}	—	May 5, 2008	Kitt Peak	Spacewatch	·	790 m	MPC · JPL
688126	2012 JS_{17}	—	May 15, 2012	Mount Lemmon	Mount Lemmon Survey	APO	220 m	MPC · JPL
688127	2012 JX_{22}	—	May 12, 2012	Mount Lemmon	Mount Lemmon Survey	·	2.9 km	MPC · JPL
688128	2012 JM_{27}	—	September 26, 2003	Apache Point	SDSS Collaboration	·	2.5 km	MPC · JPL
688129	2012 JX_{29}	—	May 14, 2012	Haleakala	Pan-STARRS 1	·	800 m	MPC · JPL
688130	2012 JC_{37}	—	September 3, 2007	Mount Lemmon	Mount Lemmon Survey	·	2.8 km	MPC · JPL
688131	2012 JP_{37}	—	May 1, 2012	Mount Lemmon	Mount Lemmon Survey	·	2.8 km	MPC · JPL
688132	2012 JH_{38}	—	May 3, 2012	Charleston	R. Holmes	·	900 m	MPC · JPL
688133	2012 JU_{39}	—	April 24, 2001	Kitt Peak	Spacewatch	NYS	930 m	MPC · JPL
688134	2012 JF_{48}	—	May 15, 2012	Mount Lemmon	Mount Lemmon Survey	·	810 m	MPC · JPL
688135	2012 JZ_{50}	—	May 14, 2012	Kitt Peak	Spacewatch	·	1.1 km	MPC · JPL
688136	2012 JP_{54}	—	April 27, 2008	Kitt Peak	Spacewatch	·	930 m	MPC · JPL
688137	2012 JN_{55}	—	April 21, 2012	Mount Lemmon	Mount Lemmon Survey	AEO	990 m	MPC · JPL
688138	2012 JU_{63}	—	May 1, 2012	Mount Lemmon	Mount Lemmon Survey	THM	2.1 km	MPC · JPL
688139	2012 JZ_{64}	—	April 29, 2008	Mount Lemmon	Mount Lemmon Survey	·	1.3 km	MPC · JPL
688140	2012 JO_{67}	—	January 30, 2006	Kitt Peak	Spacewatch	·	1.8 km	MPC · JPL
688141	2012 JQ_{68}	—	September 28, 2013	Mount Lemmon	Mount Lemmon Survey	·	740 m	MPC · JPL
688142	2012 JX_{68}	—	January 4, 2016	Haleakala	Pan-STARRS 1	·	2.7 km	MPC · JPL
688143	2012 JM_{71}	—	May 12, 2012	Mount Lemmon	Mount Lemmon Survey	·	820 m	MPC · JPL
688144	2012 JZ_{72}	—	May 14, 2012	Haleakala	Pan-STARRS 1	HNS	870 m	MPC · JPL
688145	2012 KE_{2}	—	May 21, 2006	Catalina	CSS	T_{j} (2.98)	4.1 km	MPC · JPL
688146	2012 KK_{3}	—	September 6, 2008	Kitt Peak	Spacewatch	·	2.2 km	MPC · JPL
688147	2012 KU_{4}	—	May 16, 2012	Kitt Peak	Spacewatch	·	3.1 km	MPC · JPL
688148	2012 KJ_{5}	—	April 21, 2012	Mount Lemmon	Mount Lemmon Survey	·	770 m	MPC · JPL
688149	2012 KT_{9}	—	January 25, 2011	Kitt Peak	Spacewatch	·	3.2 km	MPC · JPL
688150	2012 KP_{10}	—	April 28, 2012	Mount Lemmon	Mount Lemmon Survey	·	850 m	MPC · JPL
688151	2012 KL_{13}	—	September 28, 2009	Mount Lemmon	Mount Lemmon Survey	·	970 m	MPC · JPL
688152	2012 KN_{14}	—	December 4, 2005	Mount Lemmon	Mount Lemmon Survey	·	720 m	MPC · JPL
688153	2012 KF_{15}	—	May 19, 2012	Mount Lemmon	Mount Lemmon Survey	ADE	1.2 km	MPC · JPL
688154	2012 KU_{29}	—	February 7, 2011	Mount Lemmon	Mount Lemmon Survey	·	2.5 km	MPC · JPL
688155	2012 KD_{31}	—	September 28, 2003	Kitt Peak	Spacewatch	·	2.1 km	MPC · JPL
688156	2012 KQ_{31}	—	April 27, 2012	Haleakala	Pan-STARRS 1	·	790 m	MPC · JPL
688157	2012 KS_{38}	—	March 24, 2012	Kitt Peak	Spacewatch	·	590 m	MPC · JPL
688158	2012 KW_{39}	—	May 5, 2008	Mount Lemmon	Mount Lemmon Survey	·	800 m	MPC · JPL
688159	2012 KO_{41}	—	January 16, 2000	Kitt Peak	Spacewatch	·	2.0 km	MPC · JPL
688160	2012 KC_{43}	—	May 16, 2012	Haleakala	Pan-STARRS 1	·	950 m	MPC · JPL
688161	2012 KO_{51}	—	May 18, 2012	Siding Spring	Guido, E.	·	2.5 km	MPC · JPL
688162	2012 KV_{52}	—	May 16, 2012	Kitt Peak	Spacewatch	·	2.9 km	MPC · JPL
688163	2012 KY_{52}	—	May 29, 2012	Mount Lemmon	Mount Lemmon Survey	·	790 m	MPC · JPL
688164	2012 KW_{54}	—	April 12, 2016	Haleakala	Pan-STARRS 1	·	750 m	MPC · JPL
688165	2012 KV_{56}	—	September 25, 2008	Kitt Peak	Spacewatch	·	1.6 km	MPC · JPL
688166	2012 KZ_{60}	—	May 27, 2012	Mount Lemmon	Mount Lemmon Survey	·	900 m	MPC · JPL
688167	2012 KG_{61}	—	May 28, 2012	Mount Lemmon	Mount Lemmon Survey	·	1.1 km	MPC · JPL
688168	2012 KY_{61}	—	May 19, 2012	Mount Lemmon	Mount Lemmon Survey	·	2.7 km	MPC · JPL
688169	2012 LH_{3}	—	May 15, 2012	Haleakala	Pan-STARRS 1	·	1.1 km	MPC · JPL
688170	2012 LS_{3}	—	May 15, 2012	Haleakala	Pan-STARRS 1	·	2.0 km	MPC · JPL
688171	2012 LP_{9}	—	May 21, 2012	Haleakala	Pan-STARRS 1	·	1.3 km	MPC · JPL
688172	2012 LX_{9}	—	April 21, 2012	Mount Lemmon	Mount Lemmon Survey	·	1.2 km	MPC · JPL
688173	2012 LS_{11}	—	June 13, 2012	Kitt Peak	Spacewatch	T_{j} (2.98) · EUP	3.8 km	MPC · JPL
688174	2012 LT_{13}	—	June 10, 2012	Kitt Peak	Spacewatch	·	920 m	MPC · JPL
688175	2012 LO_{24}	—	June 8, 2012	Mount Lemmon	Mount Lemmon Survey	·	1.2 km	MPC · JPL
688176	2012 LN_{26}	—	July 17, 2007	Dauban	C. Rinner, Kugel, F.	·	3.5 km	MPC · JPL
688177	2012 LV_{27}	—	July 24, 2007	Lulin	LUSS	·	3.8 km	MPC · JPL
688178	2012 LO_{28}	—	April 11, 2016	Haleakala	Pan-STARRS 1	·	1.3 km	MPC · JPL
688179	2012 LM_{29}	—	October 26, 2013	Catalina	CSS	·	1.4 km	MPC · JPL
688180	2012 LO_{29}	—	November 10, 2013	Mount Lemmon	Mount Lemmon Survey	·	3.2 km	MPC · JPL
688181	2012 LZ_{29}	—	January 14, 2015	Haleakala	Pan-STARRS 1	·	1.3 km	MPC · JPL
688182	2012 LM_{31}	—	June 8, 2012	Mount Lemmon	Mount Lemmon Survey	·	890 m	MPC · JPL
688183	2012 LY_{31}	—	June 9, 2012	Mount Lemmon	Mount Lemmon Survey	·	780 m	MPC · JPL
688184	2012 MC	—	January 16, 2004	Kitt Peak	Spacewatch	·	3.4 km	MPC · JPL
688185	2012 MF_{1}	—	May 21, 2012	Haleakala	Pan-STARRS 1	EMA	3.0 km	MPC · JPL
688186	2012 MH_{1}	—	June 17, 2012	Mount Lemmon	Mount Lemmon Survey	EOS	1.5 km	MPC · JPL
688187	2012 MK_{1}	—	May 1, 2000	Kitt Peak	Spacewatch	·	3.2 km	MPC · JPL
688188	2012 MJ_{2}	—	June 18, 2012	Mount Lemmon	Mount Lemmon Survey	ADE	1.5 km	MPC · JPL
688189	2012 MS_{3}	—	May 20, 2012	Mount Lemmon	Mount Lemmon Survey	·	1.3 km	MPC · JPL
688190	2012 MK_{11}	—	January 14, 2011	Kitt Peak	Spacewatch	·	1.0 km	MPC · JPL
688191	2012 MV_{11}	—	June 16, 2012	Haleakala	Pan-STARRS 1	·	1.1 km	MPC · JPL
688192	2012 MC_{12}	—	June 16, 2012	Haleakala	Pan-STARRS 1	·	2.0 km	MPC · JPL
688193	2012 MZ_{13}	—	June 1, 2008	Mount Lemmon	Mount Lemmon Survey	·	960 m	MPC · JPL
688194	2012 MC_{16}	—	June 21, 2012	ESA OGS	ESA OGS	·	1.2 km	MPC · JPL
688195	2012 MW_{16}	—	June 17, 2012	Mount Lemmon	Mount Lemmon Survey	·	1.7 km	MPC · JPL
688196	2012 MS_{17}	—	February 22, 2015	Haleakala	Pan-STARRS 1	MAR	870 m	MPC · JPL
688197	2012 MP_{18}	—	June 22, 2012	Kitt Peak	Spacewatch	·	1.2 km	MPC · JPL
688198	2012 MQ_{18}	—	June 23, 2012	Kitt Peak	Spacewatch	EUN	880 m	MPC · JPL
688199	2012 MR_{18}	—	June 16, 2012	Haleakala	Pan-STARRS 1	·	1.2 km	MPC · JPL
688200	2012 MD_{19}	—	June 18, 2012	Mount Lemmon	Mount Lemmon Survey	·	1.1 km	MPC · JPL

== 688201–688300 ==
back to top

Designation			Discovery			Properties		Ref
Permanent	Provisional	Named after	Date	Site	Discoverer(s)	Category	Diam.	Ref
688201	2012 NR	—	April 5, 2008	Mount Lemmon	Mount Lemmon Survey	·	520 m	MPC · JPL
688202	2012 NT	—	July 15, 2012	Socorro	LINEAR	·	580 m	MPC · JPL
688203	2012 OB_{2}	—	September 9, 2008	Catalina	CSS	·	1.6 km	MPC · JPL
688204	2012 OQ_{6}	—	August 8, 2004	Palomar	NEAT	·	1.2 km	MPC · JPL
688205	2012 OL_{7}	—	July 21, 2012	Zelenchukskaya Stn	T. V. Krjačko, Satovski, B.	·	1.2 km	MPC · JPL
688206	2012 PT_{1}	—	August 8, 2012	Haleakala	Pan-STARRS 1	·	1.6 km	MPC · JPL
688207	2012 PX_{6}	—	September 24, 2008	Mount Lemmon	Mount Lemmon Survey	MAR	800 m	MPC · JPL
688208	2012 PE_{7}	—	August 8, 2012	Haleakala	Pan-STARRS 1	·	1.1 km	MPC · JPL
688209	2012 PG_{10}	—	February 26, 2006	Kitt Peak	Spacewatch	H	420 m	MPC · JPL
688210	2012 PC_{19}	—	August 13, 2012	Haleakala	Pan-STARRS 1	H	320 m	MPC · JPL
688211	2012 PA_{21}	—	July 20, 2012	Mayhill-ISON	L. Elenin	·	580 m	MPC · JPL
688212	2012 PY_{24}	—	August 12, 2012	Siding Spring	SSS	·	980 m	MPC · JPL
688213	2012 PW_{32}	—	August 14, 2012	Siding Spring	SSS	·	1.4 km	MPC · JPL
688214	2012 PH_{36}	—	August 13, 2012	Haleakala	Pan-STARRS 1	·	550 m	MPC · JPL
688215	2012 PV_{36}	—	April 1, 2011	Mount Lemmon	Mount Lemmon Survey	V	600 m	MPC · JPL
688216	2012 PK_{39}	—	August 8, 2012	Haleakala	Pan-STARRS 1	ADE	1.1 km	MPC · JPL
688217	2012 PK_{40}	—	September 5, 2008	Kitt Peak	Spacewatch	·	1.2 km	MPC · JPL
688218	2012 PW_{44}	—	February 2, 2001	Kitt Peak	Spacewatch	·	1.4 km	MPC · JPL
688219	2012 PD_{46}	—	September 18, 2003	Kitt Peak	Spacewatch	·	1.7 km	MPC · JPL
688220	2012 PV_{46}	—	August 1, 2017	Haleakala	Pan-STARRS 1	·	1.4 km	MPC · JPL
688221	2012 PH_{48}	—	December 25, 2013	Mount Lemmon	Mount Lemmon Survey	EUN	1.1 km	MPC · JPL
688222	2012 PW_{50}	—	February 23, 2015	Haleakala	Pan-STARRS 1	·	1.1 km	MPC · JPL
688223	2012 PG_{54}	—	August 12, 2012	Haleakala	Pan-STARRS 1	·	970 m	MPC · JPL
688224	2012 PJ_{54}	—	August 10, 2012	Kitt Peak	Spacewatch	·	1.2 km	MPC · JPL
688225	2012 PR_{58}	—	August 14, 2012	Haleakala	Pan-STARRS 1	·	1.2 km	MPC · JPL
688226	2012 PQ_{59}	—	August 13, 2012	Haleakala	Pan-STARRS 1	EUN	1.1 km	MPC · JPL
688227	2012 PD_{60}	—	August 10, 2012	Kitt Peak	Spacewatch	·	960 m	MPC · JPL
688228	2012 PA_{62}	—	August 13, 2012	Haleakala	Pan-STARRS 1	·	500 m	MPC · JPL
688229	2012 QK_{1}	—	May 28, 2012	Mount Lemmon	Mount Lemmon Survey	·	1.2 km	MPC · JPL
688230	2012 QN_{6}	—	August 13, 2004	Cerro Tololo	Deep Ecliptic Survey	·	980 m	MPC · JPL
688231	2012 QU_{6}	—	April 22, 2007	Mount Lemmon	Mount Lemmon Survey	MIS	2.3 km	MPC · JPL
688232	2012 QX_{10}	—	August 10, 2012	Haleakala	Pan-STARRS 1	·	1.5 km	MPC · JPL
688233	2012 QZ_{19}	—	August 22, 2012	Haleakala	Pan-STARRS 1	·	1.2 km	MPC · JPL
688234	2012 QJ_{20}	—	August 22, 2012	Haleakala	Pan-STARRS 1	·	1.1 km	MPC · JPL
688235	2012 QO_{21}	—	August 24, 2012	Kitt Peak	Spacewatch	·	1.3 km	MPC · JPL
688236	2012 QZ_{22}	—	November 7, 2008	Kitt Peak	Spacewatch	·	1.4 km	MPC · JPL
688237	2012 QU_{23}	—	August 24, 2012	Kitt Peak	Spacewatch	·	1.2 km	MPC · JPL
688238	2012 QA_{29}	—	August 24, 2012	Haleakala	Pan-STARRS 1	H	370 m	MPC · JPL
688239	2012 QF_{37}	—	August 25, 2012	Kitt Peak	Spacewatch	·	1.3 km	MPC · JPL
688240	2012 QD_{42}	—	August 11, 2012	Siding Spring	SSS	·	3.1 km	MPC · JPL
688241	2012 QG_{43}	—	August 13, 2012	Haleakala	Pan-STARRS 1	·	1.5 km	MPC · JPL
688242	2012 QZ_{46}	—	September 23, 2008	Mount Lemmon	Mount Lemmon Survey	·	1.3 km	MPC · JPL
688243	2012 QG_{51}	—	August 25, 2008	La Sagra	OAM	(194)	1.2 km	MPC · JPL
688244	2012 QP_{51}	—	August 28, 2012	Catalina	CSS	·	1.7 km	MPC · JPL
688245	2012 QD_{58}	—	August 26, 2012	Kitt Peak	Spacewatch	·	1.3 km	MPC · JPL
688246	2012 QK_{65}	—	August 26, 2012	Haleakala	Pan-STARRS 1	·	1.2 km	MPC · JPL
688247	2012 QS_{66}	—	August 26, 2012	Haleakala	Pan-STARRS 1	·	1.3 km	MPC · JPL
688248	2012 QY_{68}	—	August 26, 2012	Haleakala	Pan-STARRS 1	·	1.5 km	MPC · JPL
688249	2012 QR_{69}	—	August 26, 2012	Haleakala	Pan-STARRS 1	·	1.6 km	MPC · JPL
688250	2012 QD_{73}	—	August 26, 2012	Haleakala	Pan-STARRS 1	·	1.5 km	MPC · JPL
688251	2012 QH_{73}	—	August 22, 2012	Haleakala	Pan-STARRS 1	WIT	690 m	MPC · JPL
688252	2012 RN_{8}	—	August 27, 2012	Haleakala	Pan-STARRS 1	MAR	1.1 km	MPC · JPL
688253	2012 RW_{10}	—	October 21, 2008	Kitt Peak	Spacewatch	·	1.1 km	MPC · JPL
688254	2012 RS_{12}	—	July 7, 2003	Kitt Peak	Spacewatch	·	1.8 km	MPC · JPL
688255	2012 RE_{19}	—	September 14, 2012	Catalina	CSS	·	1.3 km	MPC · JPL
688256	2012 RT_{26}	—	August 26, 2012	Catalina	CSS	·	1.3 km	MPC · JPL
688257	2012 RZ_{26}	—	October 1, 2000	Apache Point	SDSS Collaboration	·	1.1 km	MPC · JPL
688258	2012 RU_{31}	—	September 25, 2008	Kitt Peak	Spacewatch	·	1.1 km	MPC · JPL
688259	2012 RQ_{32}	—	August 23, 2003	Palomar	NEAT	·	2.1 km	MPC · JPL
688260	2012 RD_{34}	—	August 26, 2012	Haleakala	Pan-STARRS 1	·	1.3 km	MPC · JPL
688261	2012 RQ_{36}	—	September 6, 2012	Haleakala	Pan-STARRS 1	·	2.4 km	MPC · JPL
688262	2012 RO_{37}	—	September 30, 2003	Kitt Peak	Spacewatch	·	1.7 km	MPC · JPL
688263	2012 RP_{42}	—	October 31, 2008	Catalina	CSS	(1547)	1.7 km	MPC · JPL
688264	2012 RG_{43}	—	October 11, 2012	Mount Lemmon	Mount Lemmon Survey	·	1.3 km	MPC · JPL
688265	2012 RZ_{43}	—	September 13, 2012	Siding Spring	SSS	·	2.1 km	MPC · JPL
688266	2012 RD_{44}	—	March 10, 2005	Mount Lemmon	Mount Lemmon Survey	KOR	1.3 km	MPC · JPL
688267	2012 RD_{46}	—	September 15, 2006	Kitt Peak	Spacewatch	·	2.9 km	MPC · JPL
688268	2012 RL_{46}	—	October 30, 2017	Nogales	M. Schwartz, P. R. Holvorcem	·	2.0 km	MPC · JPL
688269	2012 RJ_{48}	—	September 11, 2012	ASC-Kislovodsk	ASC-Kislovodsk	·	2.1 km	MPC · JPL
688270	2012 RU_{48}	—	September 14, 2012	Mount Lemmon	Mount Lemmon Survey	·	1.6 km	MPC · JPL
688271	2012 RE_{49}	—	September 10, 2012	Charleston	R. Holmes	·	1.0 km	MPC · JPL
688272	2012 SF_{8}	—	September 21, 2003	Kitt Peak	Spacewatch	·	1.7 km	MPC · JPL
688273	2012 SO_{8}	—	September 17, 2012	La Sagra	OAM	·	740 m	MPC · JPL
688274	2012 SU_{8}	—	September 16, 2012	Mount Lemmon	Mount Lemmon Survey	·	1.4 km	MPC · JPL
688275	2012 SV_{10}	—	September 14, 2012	Catalina	CSS	·	1.9 km	MPC · JPL
688276	2012 SX_{13}	—	August 22, 2003	Palomar	NEAT	·	1.7 km	MPC · JPL
688277	2012 SP_{15}	—	September 17, 2012	Mount Lemmon	Mount Lemmon Survey	·	1.4 km	MPC · JPL
688278	2012 SZ_{19}	—	October 26, 2008	Kitt Peak	Spacewatch	·	1.6 km	MPC · JPL
688279	2012 SG_{20}	—	August 26, 2012	Haleakala	Pan-STARRS 1	·	1.2 km	MPC · JPL
688280	2012 SV_{21}	—	October 6, 2008	Mount Lemmon	Mount Lemmon Survey	·	1.3 km	MPC · JPL
688281	2012 SN_{23}	—	November 1, 2008	Mount Lemmon	Mount Lemmon Survey	·	1.6 km	MPC · JPL
688282	2012 SW_{23}	—	September 17, 2012	Mount Lemmon	Mount Lemmon Survey	·	1.5 km	MPC · JPL
688283	2012 SS_{25}	—	September 17, 2012	Mount Lemmon	Mount Lemmon Survey	NEM	1.9 km	MPC · JPL
688284	2012 ST_{25}	—	August 31, 2000	Kitt Peak	Spacewatch	NYS	1.1 km	MPC · JPL
688285	2012 SB_{28}	—	September 18, 2012	Kitt Peak	Spacewatch	·	1.5 km	MPC · JPL
688286	2012 SD_{33}	—	May 13, 2011	Mount Lemmon	Mount Lemmon Survey	·	1.8 km	MPC · JPL
688287	2012 SV_{34}	—	March 26, 2007	Mount Lemmon	Mount Lemmon Survey	·	1.1 km	MPC · JPL
688288	2012 SV_{35}	—	September 18, 2012	Mount Lemmon	Mount Lemmon Survey	·	1.1 km	MPC · JPL
688289	2012 SU_{39}	—	September 18, 2012	Mount Lemmon	Mount Lemmon Survey	·	1.6 km	MPC · JPL
688290	2012 SF_{40}	—	September 18, 2012	Mount Lemmon	Mount Lemmon Survey	AEO	870 m	MPC · JPL
688291	2012 SM_{41}	—	September 18, 2012	Mount Lemmon	Mount Lemmon Survey	·	1.4 km	MPC · JPL
688292	2012 SN_{48}	—	March 12, 2008	Kitt Peak	Spacewatch	·	640 m	MPC · JPL
688293	2012 SV_{48}	—	October 20, 2003	Kitt Peak	Spacewatch	·	1.4 km	MPC · JPL
688294	2012 SQ_{52}	—	November 30, 2008	Kitt Peak	Spacewatch	·	1.6 km	MPC · JPL
688295	2012 SF_{53}	—	January 26, 2015	Haleakala	Pan-STARRS 1	·	1.8 km	MPC · JPL
688296	2012 SE_{62}	—	September 21, 2012	Kitt Peak	Spacewatch	GEF	1.2 km	MPC · JPL
688297	2012 SB_{64}	—	November 1, 2008	Mount Lemmon	Mount Lemmon Survey	MIS	2.0 km	MPC · JPL
688298	2012 SD_{73}	—	August 28, 2016	Mount Lemmon	Mount Lemmon Survey	·	1.7 km	MPC · JPL
688299	2012 SO_{73}	—	September 21, 2012	Mount Lemmon	Mount Lemmon Survey	·	1.7 km	MPC · JPL
688300	2012 SP_{75}	—	November 9, 2013	Mount Lemmon	Mount Lemmon Survey	3:2	4.0 km	MPC · JPL

== 688301–688400 ==
back to top

Designation			Discovery			Properties		Ref
Permanent	Provisional	Named after	Date	Site	Discoverer(s)	Category	Diam.	Ref
688301	2012 SB_{78}	—	September 25, 2012	Kitt Peak	Spacewatch	·	1.3 km	MPC · JPL
688302	2012 SH_{81}	—	September 26, 2017	Haleakala	Pan-STARRS 1	·	1.3 km	MPC · JPL
688303	2012 SJ_{85}	—	September 21, 2012	Kitt Peak	Spacewatch	·	1.5 km	MPC · JPL
688304	2012 SQ_{86}	—	September 25, 2012	Kitt Peak	Spacewatch	·	1.5 km	MPC · JPL
688305	2012 ST_{89}	—	September 21, 2012	Mount Lemmon	Mount Lemmon Survey	L5	5.9 km	MPC · JPL
688306	2012 SL_{92}	—	September 17, 2012	Mount Lemmon	Mount Lemmon Survey	HOF	2.0 km	MPC · JPL
688307	2012 SV_{92}	—	September 21, 2012	Kitt Peak	Spacewatch	·	1.5 km	MPC · JPL
688308	2012 SF_{93}	—	September 22, 2012	Kitt Peak	Spacewatch	·	1.0 km	MPC · JPL
688309	2012 SL_{93}	—	September 17, 2012	Kitt Peak	Spacewatch	·	1.6 km	MPC · JPL
688310	2012 SQ_{93}	—	September 17, 2012	Mount Lemmon	Mount Lemmon Survey	(17392)	1.3 km	MPC · JPL
688311	2012 SS_{94}	—	September 25, 2012	Kitt Peak	Spacewatch	·	1.4 km	MPC · JPL
688312	2012 SR_{96}	—	September 24, 2012	Mount Lemmon	Mount Lemmon Survey	·	1.3 km	MPC · JPL
688313	2012 SJ_{97}	—	September 21, 2012	Mount Lemmon	Mount Lemmon Survey	·	1.3 km	MPC · JPL
688314	2012 SK_{97}	—	September 22, 2012	Kitt Peak	Spacewatch	·	1.3 km	MPC · JPL
688315	2012 SP_{97}	—	September 16, 2012	Kitt Peak	Spacewatch	·	1.3 km	MPC · JPL
688316	2012 TH_{1}	—	March 26, 2007	Kitt Peak	Spacewatch	·	1.1 km	MPC · JPL
688317	2012 TA_{10}	—	October 6, 2012	Catalina	CSS	·	1.0 km	MPC · JPL
688318	2012 TD_{10}	—	July 20, 2003	Palomar	NEAT	·	2.0 km	MPC · JPL
688319	2012 TW_{12}	—	October 6, 2012	Mount Lemmon	Mount Lemmon Survey	·	680 m	MPC · JPL
688320	2012 TQ_{19}	—	October 18, 2009	Mount Lemmon	Mount Lemmon Survey	·	650 m	MPC · JPL
688321	2012 TJ_{20}	—	October 8, 2012	Mount Lemmon	Mount Lemmon Survey	H	350 m	MPC · JPL
688322	2012 TY_{25}	—	September 28, 2009	Mount Lemmon	Mount Lemmon Survey	·	680 m	MPC · JPL
688323	2012 TD_{30}	—	September 15, 2012	ESA OGS	ESA OGS	·	1.2 km	MPC · JPL
688324	2012 TR_{32}	—	October 6, 2012	Mount Lemmon	Mount Lemmon Survey	·	570 m	MPC · JPL
688325	2012 TQ_{33}	—	October 6, 2012	Mount Lemmon	Mount Lemmon Survey	·	430 m	MPC · JPL
688326	2012 TP_{40}	—	September 24, 2012	Kitt Peak	Spacewatch	·	1.5 km	MPC · JPL
688327	2012 TS_{41}	—	October 26, 2008	Mount Lemmon	Mount Lemmon Survey	·	1.4 km	MPC · JPL
688328	2012 TU_{41}	—	October 8, 2012	Mount Lemmon	Mount Lemmon Survey	·	1.4 km	MPC · JPL
688329	2012 TK_{42}	—	October 8, 2012	Mount Lemmon	Mount Lemmon Survey	·	2.2 km	MPC · JPL
688330	2012 TJ_{46}	—	October 24, 2008	Mount Lemmon	Mount Lemmon Survey	·	1.2 km	MPC · JPL
688331	2012 TH_{48}	—	October 8, 2012	Haleakala	Pan-STARRS 1	·	1.2 km	MPC · JPL
688332	2012 TM_{48}	—	October 8, 2012	Haleakala	Pan-STARRS 1	·	1.4 km	MPC · JPL
688333	2012 TR_{48}	—	October 5, 2012	Mount Lemmon	Mount Lemmon Survey	·	1.2 km	MPC · JPL
688334	2012 TX_{50}	—	September 16, 2012	Kitt Peak	Spacewatch	·	1.4 km	MPC · JPL
688335	2012 TN_{59}	—	October 8, 2012	Mount Lemmon	Mount Lemmon Survey	·	1.3 km	MPC · JPL
688336	2012 TR_{59}	—	October 8, 2012	Mount Lemmon	Mount Lemmon Survey	AST	1.3 km	MPC · JPL
688337	2012 TJ_{78}	—	October 8, 2012	Haleakala	Pan-STARRS 1	H	350 m	MPC · JPL
688338	2012 TT_{80}	—	November 1, 2008	Mount Lemmon	Mount Lemmon Survey	·	1.2 km	MPC · JPL
688339	2012 TP_{83}	—	September 16, 2012	Kitt Peak	Spacewatch	·	1.6 km	MPC · JPL
688340	2012 TF_{87}	—	October 6, 2012	Mount Lemmon	Mount Lemmon Survey	·	1.4 km	MPC · JPL
688341	2012 TG_{98}	—	September 15, 2012	Kitt Peak	Spacewatch	·	650 m	MPC · JPL
688342	2012 TJ_{102}	—	October 9, 2012	Mount Lemmon	Mount Lemmon Survey	·	1.5 km	MPC · JPL
688343	2012 TL_{102}	—	October 9, 2012	Mount Lemmon	Mount Lemmon Survey	·	1.5 km	MPC · JPL
688344	2012 TV_{104}	—	October 9, 2012	Mount Lemmon	Mount Lemmon Survey	·	1.8 km	MPC · JPL
688345	2012 TL_{110}	—	October 10, 2012	Mount Lemmon	Mount Lemmon Survey	·	2.0 km	MPC · JPL
688346	2012 TV_{111}	—	October 10, 2012	Mount Lemmon	Mount Lemmon Survey	·	1.5 km	MPC · JPL
688347	2012 TG_{112}	—	May 7, 2011	Kitt Peak	Spacewatch	·	1.4 km	MPC · JPL
688348	2012 TB_{114}	—	December 30, 2008	Mount Lemmon	Mount Lemmon Survey	·	1.4 km	MPC · JPL
688349	2012 TG_{114}	—	December 5, 2008	Mount Lemmon	Mount Lemmon Survey	·	1.5 km	MPC · JPL
688350	2012 TP_{121}	—	October 10, 2012	Mount Lemmon	Mount Lemmon Survey	·	1.1 km	MPC · JPL
688351	2012 TG_{126}	—	October 9, 2012	Catalina	CSS	·	2.0 km	MPC · JPL
688352	2012 TM_{127}	—	September 14, 2012	Catalina	CSS	EUN	1.0 km	MPC · JPL
688353	2012 TL_{132}	—	November 2, 1999	Kitt Peak	Spacewatch	·	1.5 km	MPC · JPL
688354	2012 TN_{132}	—	September 22, 2012	Kitt Peak	Spacewatch	·	1.3 km	MPC · JPL
688355	2012 TD_{135}	—	October 20, 2003	Kitt Peak	Spacewatch	·	1.6 km	MPC · JPL
688356	2012 TR_{136}	—	September 24, 2012	Kitt Peak	Spacewatch	·	540 m	MPC · JPL
688357	2012 TW_{136}	—	September 26, 2003	Apache Point	SDSS Collaboration	·	1.4 km	MPC · JPL
688358	2012 TP_{140}	—	August 21, 2004	Siding Spring	SSS	H	390 m	MPC · JPL
688359	2012 TO_{143}	—	October 8, 2012	Haleakala	Pan-STARRS 1	WIT	720 m	MPC · JPL
688360	2012 TK_{156}	—	March 25, 2010	Mount Lemmon	Mount Lemmon Survey	NEM	1.6 km	MPC · JPL
688361	2012 TF_{158}	—	November 18, 2008	Kitt Peak	Spacewatch	·	1.2 km	MPC · JPL
688362	2012 TS_{160}	—	May 31, 2011	Kitt Peak	Spacewatch	·	1.4 km	MPC · JPL
688363	2012 TT_{160}	—	October 8, 2012	Haleakala	Pan-STARRS 1	·	1.4 km	MPC · JPL
688364	2012 TE_{162}	—	October 8, 2012	Haleakala	Pan-STARRS 1	·	1.5 km	MPC · JPL
688365	2012 TN_{164}	—	October 8, 2012	Haleakala	Pan-STARRS 1	·	1.3 km	MPC · JPL
688366	2012 TE_{165}	—	October 22, 2003	Apache Point	SDSS Collaboration	·	1.4 km	MPC · JPL
688367	2012 TD_{171}	—	October 1, 1995	Kitt Peak	Spacewatch	EUN	960 m	MPC · JPL
688368	2012 TS_{171}	—	October 9, 2012	Mount Lemmon	Mount Lemmon Survey	AGN	840 m	MPC · JPL
688369	2012 TK_{172}	—	September 24, 2012	Kitt Peak	Spacewatch	HOF	1.9 km	MPC · JPL
688370	2012 TD_{183}	—	September 21, 2012	Kitt Peak	Spacewatch	·	1.4 km	MPC · JPL
688371	2012 TF_{185}	—	November 21, 2008	Kitt Peak	Spacewatch	·	1.3 km	MPC · JPL
688372	2012 TT_{187}	—	October 9, 2012	Mount Lemmon	Mount Lemmon Survey	·	570 m	MPC · JPL
688373	2012 TK_{193}	—	October 10, 2012	Kitt Peak	Spacewatch	·	1.9 km	MPC · JPL
688374	2012 TH_{194}	—	January 27, 2007	Mount Lemmon	Mount Lemmon Survey	·	510 m	MPC · JPL
688375	2012 TP_{200}	—	November 20, 2008	Mount Lemmon	Mount Lemmon Survey	·	1.2 km	MPC · JPL
688376	2012 TN_{203}	—	November 1, 1999	Kitt Peak	Spacewatch	·	1.5 km	MPC · JPL
688377	2012 TM_{204}	—	October 11, 2012	Mount Lemmon	Mount Lemmon Survey	·	560 m	MPC · JPL
688378	2012 TQ_{204}	—	October 11, 2012	Mount Lemmon	Mount Lemmon Survey	·	1.3 km	MPC · JPL
688379	2012 TR_{204}	—	September 30, 2003	Kitt Peak	Spacewatch	·	1.3 km	MPC · JPL
688380	2012 TF_{206}	—	October 11, 2012	Mount Lemmon	Mount Lemmon Survey	·	1.2 km	MPC · JPL
688381	2012 TH_{213}	—	September 30, 2003	Kitt Peak	Spacewatch	NEM	1.5 km	MPC · JPL
688382	2012 TJ_{215}	—	October 11, 2012	Piszkéstető	K. Sárneczky	H	430 m	MPC · JPL
688383	2012 TH_{217}	—	October 13, 2012	Haleakala	Pan-STARRS 1	·	1.6 km	MPC · JPL
688384	2012 TA_{218}	—	October 14, 2012	ESA OGS	ESA OGS	·	1.2 km	MPC · JPL
688385	2012 TR_{219}	—	October 14, 2012	Mount Lemmon	Mount Lemmon Survey	3:2	3.9 km	MPC · JPL
688386	2012 TX_{219}	—	October 14, 2012	Mount Lemmon	Mount Lemmon Survey	·	620 m	MPC · JPL
688387	2012 TT_{224}	—	October 15, 2012	Haleakala	Pan-STARRS 1	AGN	940 m	MPC · JPL
688388	2012 TM_{226}	—	November 1, 1999	Kitt Peak	Spacewatch	·	1.4 km	MPC · JPL
688389	2012 TU_{226}	—	October 15, 2012	Haleakala	Pan-STARRS 1	·	1.6 km	MPC · JPL
688390	2012 TP_{228}	—	October 6, 2012	Mount Lemmon	Mount Lemmon Survey	MIS	2.0 km	MPC · JPL
688391	2012 TF_{229}	—	September 24, 2012	Kitt Peak	Spacewatch	·	1.4 km	MPC · JPL
688392	2012 TE_{231}	—	October 7, 2012	Haleakala	Pan-STARRS 1	·	1.7 km	MPC · JPL
688393	2012 TM_{236}	—	October 7, 2012	Haleakala	Pan-STARRS 1	HOF	2.3 km	MPC · JPL
688394	2012 TZ_{237}	—	October 7, 2012	Haleakala	Pan-STARRS 1	·	1.5 km	MPC · JPL
688395	2012 TG_{238}	—	October 7, 2012	Haleakala	Pan-STARRS 1	·	1.3 km	MPC · JPL
688396	2012 TC_{244}	—	October 8, 2012	Haleakala	Pan-STARRS 1	·	1.6 km	MPC · JPL
688397	2012 TS_{244}	—	October 10, 2012	Haleakala	Pan-STARRS 1	·	1.7 km	MPC · JPL
688398	2012 TJ_{245}	—	September 14, 2012	Catalina	CSS	·	1.3 km	MPC · JPL
688399	2012 TD_{246}	—	September 21, 2012	Mount Lemmon	Mount Lemmon Survey	·	610 m	MPC · JPL
688400	2012 TJ_{248}	—	October 11, 2012	Haleakala	Pan-STARRS 1	·	450 m	MPC · JPL

== 688401–688500 ==
back to top

Designation			Discovery			Properties		Ref
Permanent	Provisional	Named after	Date	Site	Discoverer(s)	Category	Diam.	Ref
688401	2012 TO_{250}	—	February 16, 2010	Mount Lemmon	Mount Lemmon Survey	·	1.3 km	MPC · JPL
688402	2012 TS_{250}	—	September 21, 2012	Kitt Peak	Spacewatch	·	1.7 km	MPC · JPL
688403	2012 TU_{253}	—	March 14, 2011	Mount Lemmon	Mount Lemmon Survey	·	1.4 km	MPC · JPL
688404	2012 TW_{253}	—	October 11, 2012	Haleakala	Pan-STARRS 1	·	1.5 km	MPC · JPL
688405	2012 TX_{254}	—	October 12, 2012	Bergen-Enkheim	Suessenberger, U.	·	1.3 km	MPC · JPL
688406	2012 TU_{258}	—	October 6, 2012	Haleakala	Pan-STARRS 1	·	1.4 km	MPC · JPL
688407	2012 TR_{260}	—	November 20, 2008	Kitt Peak	Spacewatch	·	1.4 km	MPC · JPL
688408	2012 TK_{261}	—	October 8, 2012	Mount Lemmon	Mount Lemmon Survey	WIT	680 m	MPC · JPL
688409	2012 TT_{261}	—	March 23, 2006	Kitt Peak	Spacewatch	·	1.4 km	MPC · JPL
688410	2012 TB_{268}	—	September 29, 2000	Kitt Peak	Spacewatch	·	870 m	MPC · JPL
688411	2012 TD_{271}	—	November 21, 2003	Kitt Peak	Spacewatch	AGN	870 m	MPC · JPL
688412	2012 TV_{271}	—	September 26, 2003	Apache Point	SDSS Collaboration	·	1.4 km	MPC · JPL
688413	2012 TK_{272}	—	September 15, 2012	Mount Lemmon	Mount Lemmon Survey	NEM	2.0 km	MPC · JPL
688414	2012 TS_{272}	—	October 15, 2012	Mount Lemmon	Mount Lemmon Survey	·	1.3 km	MPC · JPL
688415	2012 TS_{278}	—	December 1, 2003	Kitt Peak	Spacewatch	·	1.7 km	MPC · JPL
688416	2012 TF_{281}	—	October 11, 2012	Haleakala	Pan-STARRS 1	HOF	2.0 km	MPC · JPL
688417	2012 TH_{287}	—	October 9, 2012	Kitt Peak	Spacewatch	·	1.5 km	MPC · JPL
688418	2012 TM_{292}	—	October 14, 2012	Kitt Peak	Spacewatch	·	1.5 km	MPC · JPL
688419	2012 TY_{293}	—	February 16, 2010	Mount Lemmon	Mount Lemmon Survey	·	560 m	MPC · JPL
688420	2012 TX_{294}	—	September 15, 2007	Kitt Peak	Spacewatch	PAD	1.5 km	MPC · JPL
688421	2012 TK_{297}	—	October 15, 2012	Mount Lemmon	Mount Lemmon Survey	·	1.7 km	MPC · JPL
688422	2012 TD_{299}	—	October 15, 2012	Mount Lemmon	Mount Lemmon Survey	·	1.3 km	MPC · JPL
688423	2012 TR_{302}	—	October 7, 2008	Mount Lemmon	Mount Lemmon Survey	·	1.1 km	MPC · JPL
688424	2012 TH_{303}	—	September 18, 2003	Kitt Peak	Spacewatch	·	1.1 km	MPC · JPL
688425	2012 TA_{306}	—	March 10, 2002	Kitt Peak	Spacewatch	·	1.5 km	MPC · JPL
688426	2012 TX_{307}	—	September 16, 2003	Siding Spring	G. J. Garradd, R. H. McNaught	·	1.5 km	MPC · JPL
688427	2012 TD_{311}	—	September 28, 2003	Kitt Peak	Spacewatch	·	1.3 km	MPC · JPL
688428	2012 TN_{311}	—	October 8, 2012	Catalina	CSS	ADE	1.8 km	MPC · JPL
688429	2012 TK_{315}	—	October 9, 2012	Catalina	CSS	JUN	880 m	MPC · JPL
688430	2012 TP_{316}	—	December 28, 2008	Wildberg	R. Apitzsch	·	1.5 km	MPC · JPL
688431	2012 TL_{317}	—	October 15, 2012	Siding Spring	SSS	·	2.1 km	MPC · JPL
688432	2012 TB_{325}	—	October 8, 2012	Kitt Peak	Spacewatch	NEM	1.7 km	MPC · JPL
688433	2012 TY_{326}	—	October 9, 2012	Mount Lemmon	Mount Lemmon Survey	·	1.4 km	MPC · JPL
688434	2012 TL_{327}	—	October 14, 2012	Kitt Peak	Spacewatch	·	1.6 km	MPC · JPL
688435	2012 TR_{327}	—	September 30, 2003	Kitt Peak	Spacewatch	·	1.7 km	MPC · JPL
688436	2012 TD_{329}	—	October 8, 2012	Haleakala	Pan-STARRS 1	·	1.9 km	MPC · JPL
688437	2012 TA_{331}	—	October 15, 2012	Kitt Peak	Spacewatch	·	1.6 km	MPC · JPL
688438	2012 TC_{331}	—	October 9, 2012	Mount Lemmon	Mount Lemmon Survey	·	1.5 km	MPC · JPL
688439	2012 TE_{331}	—	October 11, 2012	Kitt Peak	Spacewatch	·	510 m	MPC · JPL
688440	2012 TE_{333}	—	October 13, 2012	Catalina	CSS	·	1.6 km	MPC · JPL
688441	2012 TY_{333}	—	October 6, 2012	Haleakala	Pan-STARRS 1	GEF	960 m	MPC · JPL
688442	2012 TB_{334}	—	September 1, 2017	Haleakala	Pan-STARRS 1	·	1.4 km	MPC · JPL
688443	2012 TA_{336}	—	October 11, 2017	Mount Lemmon	Mount Lemmon Survey	WAT	1.3 km	MPC · JPL
688444	2012 TS_{336}	—	June 27, 2015	Haleakala	Pan-STARRS 1	·	490 m	MPC · JPL
688445	2012 TP_{337}	—	October 11, 2012	Haleakala	Pan-STARRS 1	·	1.5 km	MPC · JPL
688446	2012 TT_{337}	—	October 8, 2012	Mount Lemmon	Mount Lemmon Survey	·	1.4 km	MPC · JPL
688447	2012 TF_{338}	—	March 24, 2015	Mount Lemmon	Mount Lemmon Survey	·	1.3 km	MPC · JPL
688448	2012 TR_{339}	—	October 10, 2012	Mount Lemmon	Mount Lemmon Survey	·	2.3 km	MPC · JPL
688449	2012 TW_{344}	—	December 27, 2013	Mount Lemmon	Mount Lemmon Survey	·	1.3 km	MPC · JPL
688450	2012 TX_{350}	—	October 8, 2012	Haleakala	Pan-STARRS 1	·	1.5 km	MPC · JPL
688451	2012 TJ_{351}	—	October 10, 2012	Mount Lemmon	Mount Lemmon Survey	·	530 m	MPC · JPL
688452	2012 TM_{352}	—	March 31, 2014	Mount Lemmon	Mount Lemmon Survey	·	620 m	MPC · JPL
688453	2012 TV_{353}	—	April 14, 2015	Mount Lemmon	Mount Lemmon Survey	EOS	1.4 km	MPC · JPL
688454	2012 TG_{355}	—	October 8, 2012	Kitt Peak	Spacewatch	·	1.2 km	MPC · JPL
688455	2012 TX_{356}	—	October 11, 2012	Kitt Peak	Spacewatch	HOF	2.0 km	MPC · JPL
688456	2012 TC_{357}	—	October 11, 2012	Haleakala	Pan-STARRS 1	·	1.4 km	MPC · JPL
688457	2012 TO_{358}	—	October 6, 2012	Mount Lemmon	Mount Lemmon Survey	GEF	850 m	MPC · JPL
688458	2012 TS_{358}	—	October 14, 2012	Kitt Peak	Spacewatch	·	1.3 km	MPC · JPL
688459	2012 TR_{363}	—	October 10, 2012	Mount Lemmon	Mount Lemmon Survey	EUN	880 m	MPC · JPL
688460	2012 TA_{367}	—	October 10, 2012	Mount Lemmon	Mount Lemmon Survey	·	1.7 km	MPC · JPL
688461	2012 TQ_{373}	—	October 10, 2012	Mount Lemmon	Mount Lemmon Survey	AGN	880 m	MPC · JPL
688462	2012 TV_{373}	—	October 9, 2012	Haleakala	Pan-STARRS 1	·	1.7 km	MPC · JPL
688463	2012 TE_{375}	—	October 11, 2012	Haleakala	Pan-STARRS 1	HOF	2.1 km	MPC · JPL
688464	2012 TL_{377}	—	October 8, 2012	Kitt Peak	Spacewatch	·	1.5 km	MPC · JPL
688465	2012 TA_{378}	—	October 9, 2012	Mount Lemmon	Mount Lemmon Survey	·	1.4 km	MPC · JPL
688466	2012 TO_{378}	—	October 11, 2012	Haleakala	Pan-STARRS 1	HOF	2.1 km	MPC · JPL
688467	2012 TZ_{378}	—	October 9, 2012	Haleakala	Pan-STARRS 1	·	1.4 km	MPC · JPL
688468	2012 TU_{379}	—	October 8, 2012	Haleakala	Pan-STARRS 1	·	1.5 km	MPC · JPL
688469	2012 TA_{380}	—	October 10, 2012	Kitt Peak	Spacewatch	NEM	2.0 km	MPC · JPL
688470	2012 TY_{380}	—	October 7, 2012	Haleakala	Pan-STARRS 1	·	1.4 km	MPC · JPL
688471	2012 TB_{381}	—	October 14, 2012	Mount Lemmon	Mount Lemmon Survey	·	1.4 km	MPC · JPL
688472	2012 TJ_{381}	—	October 11, 2012	Kitt Peak	Spacewatch	·	1.4 km	MPC · JPL
688473	2012 TN_{381}	—	October 15, 2012	Haleakala	Pan-STARRS 1	·	1.5 km	MPC · JPL
688474	2012 TW_{381}	—	October 11, 2012	Mount Lemmon	Mount Lemmon Survey	EUN	1.0 km	MPC · JPL
688475	2012 TZ_{381}	—	October 11, 2012	Haleakala	Pan-STARRS 1	·	1.1 km	MPC · JPL
688476	2012 TY_{382}	—	October 7, 2012	Haleakala	Pan-STARRS 1	·	1.3 km	MPC · JPL
688477	2012 TR_{383}	—	October 15, 2012	Haleakala	Pan-STARRS 1	WIT	710 m	MPC · JPL
688478	2012 TX_{384}	—	October 7, 2012	Haleakala	Pan-STARRS 1	·	540 m	MPC · JPL
688479	2012 TL_{385}	—	October 8, 2012	Haleakala	Pan-STARRS 1	·	1.4 km	MPC · JPL
688480	2012 TF_{386}	—	March 24, 2006	Mount Lemmon	Mount Lemmon Survey	(5)	980 m	MPC · JPL
688481	2012 TJ_{387}	—	October 8, 2012	Mount Lemmon	Mount Lemmon Survey	·	1.3 km	MPC · JPL
688482	2012 TQ_{387}	—	October 9, 2012	Haleakala	Pan-STARRS 1	·	1.2 km	MPC · JPL
688483	2012 TK_{390}	—	October 10, 2012	Mount Lemmon	Mount Lemmon Survey	·	1.5 km	MPC · JPL
688484	2012 TB_{394}	—	October 11, 2012	Haleakala	Pan-STARRS 1	·	490 m	MPC · JPL
688485	2012 UC_{9}	—	November 7, 2008	Mount Lemmon	Mount Lemmon Survey	·	1.4 km	MPC · JPL
688486	2012 UN_{11}	—	August 10, 2002	Cerro Tololo	Deep Ecliptic Survey	HOF	2.1 km	MPC · JPL
688487	2012 UO_{11}	—	October 16, 2012	Mount Lemmon	Mount Lemmon Survey	GEF	930 m	MPC · JPL
688488	2012 UC_{13}	—	October 8, 2012	Mount Lemmon	Mount Lemmon Survey	·	1.3 km	MPC · JPL
688489	2012 UN_{13}	—	January 26, 2006	Kitt Peak	Spacewatch	·	1.4 km	MPC · JPL
688490	2012 UO_{15}	—	October 16, 2012	Mount Lemmon	Mount Lemmon Survey	AGN	900 m	MPC · JPL
688491	2012 UH_{16}	—	October 16, 2012	Mount Lemmon	Mount Lemmon Survey	·	1.5 km	MPC · JPL
688492	2012 UF_{17}	—	October 19, 2003	Apache Point	SDSS Collaboration	·	1.5 km	MPC · JPL
688493	2012 US_{19}	—	October 8, 2012	Mount Lemmon	Mount Lemmon Survey	MIS	1.8 km	MPC · JPL
688494	2012 UY_{19}	—	October 16, 2012	Mount Lemmon	Mount Lemmon Survey	·	1.6 km	MPC · JPL
688495	2012 UW_{20}	—	October 16, 2012	Mount Lemmon	Mount Lemmon Survey	AGN	850 m	MPC · JPL
688496	2012 UJ_{22}	—	December 6, 2008	Kitt Peak	Spacewatch	MRX	890 m	MPC · JPL
688497	2012 UO_{28}	—	December 5, 1996	Kitt Peak	Spacewatch	·	2.1 km	MPC · JPL
688498	2012 UY_{29}	—	October 8, 2012	Haleakala	Pan-STARRS 1	EUN	960 m	MPC · JPL
688499	2012 UZ_{29}	—	October 6, 1999	Socorro	LINEAR	H	320 m	MPC · JPL
688500	2012 UD_{30}	—	April 27, 2011	Haleakala	Pan-STARRS 1	·	1.6 km	MPC · JPL

== 688501–688600 ==
back to top

Designation			Discovery			Properties		Ref
Permanent	Provisional	Named after	Date	Site	Discoverer(s)	Category	Diam.	Ref
688501	2012 UL_{33}	—	November 4, 1999	Kitt Peak	Spacewatch	·	1.1 km	MPC · JPL
688502	2012 UN_{40}	—	September 30, 2003	Apache Point	SDSS Collaboration	·	1.5 km	MPC · JPL
688503	2012 UK_{42}	—	November 17, 2008	Kitt Peak	Spacewatch	·	1.2 km	MPC · JPL
688504	2012 UH_{43}	—	September 25, 2012	Mount Lemmon	Mount Lemmon Survey	·	1.6 km	MPC · JPL
688505	2012 US_{49}	—	October 18, 2012	Haleakala	Pan-STARRS 1	AGN	650 m	MPC · JPL
688506	2012 UG_{50}	—	October 18, 2012	Haleakala	Pan-STARRS 1	·	1.5 km	MPC · JPL
688507	2012 US_{51}	—	March 31, 2003	Cerro Tololo	Deep Lens Survey	·	1.0 km	MPC · JPL
688508	2012 UT_{53}	—	September 18, 2003	Kitt Peak	Spacewatch	·	1.2 km	MPC · JPL
688509	2012 UL_{56}	—	October 19, 2012	Haleakala	Pan-STARRS 1	HOF	1.8 km	MPC · JPL
688510	2012 UZ_{57}	—	September 18, 2003	Kitt Peak	Spacewatch	·	1.2 km	MPC · JPL
688511	2012 UA_{59}	—	October 19, 2012	Haleakala	Pan-STARRS 1	·	500 m	MPC · JPL
688512	2012 UD_{62}	—	October 17, 2012	Mount Lemmon	Mount Lemmon Survey	·	640 m	MPC · JPL
688513	2012 UD_{64}	—	October 20, 2012	Mount Lemmon	Mount Lemmon Survey	·	1.1 km	MPC · JPL
688514	2012 UK_{64}	—	October 20, 2012	Mount Lemmon	Mount Lemmon Survey	·	510 m	MPC · JPL
688515	2012 UK_{66}	—	October 16, 2012	Kitt Peak	Spacewatch	·	1.7 km	MPC · JPL
688516	2012 UZ_{72}	—	October 15, 2012	Nogales	M. Schwartz, P. R. Holvorcem	·	460 m	MPC · JPL
688517	2012 UH_{73}	—	October 17, 2012	Haleakala	Pan-STARRS 1	·	1.2 km	MPC · JPL
688518	2012 UQ_{74}	—	October 18, 2012	Haleakala	Pan-STARRS 1	·	1.6 km	MPC · JPL
688519	2012 UA_{75}	—	September 27, 2003	Kitt Peak	Spacewatch	·	1.4 km	MPC · JPL
688520	2012 UB_{78}	—	December 3, 2008	Kitt Peak	Spacewatch	·	1.4 km	MPC · JPL
688521	2012 UT_{80}	—	September 27, 2003	Kitt Peak	Spacewatch	·	1.6 km	MPC · JPL
688522	2012 UN_{81}	—	October 8, 2012	Kitt Peak	Spacewatch	AGN	980 m	MPC · JPL
688523	2012 UE_{83}	—	March 25, 2011	Catalina	CSS	H	430 m	MPC · JPL
688524	2012 UO_{84}	—	October 1, 2008	Mount Lemmon	Mount Lemmon Survey	·	1.1 km	MPC · JPL
688525	2012 UJ_{99}	—	October 14, 2012	Catalina	CSS	H	470 m	MPC · JPL
688526	2012 UE_{100}	—	October 18, 2012	Haleakala	Pan-STARRS 1	·	1.5 km	MPC · JPL
688527	2012 UZ_{107}	—	October 8, 2012	Mount Lemmon	Mount Lemmon Survey	AGN	850 m	MPC · JPL
688528	2012 UT_{110}	—	September 19, 2006	Kitt Peak	Spacewatch	·	2.1 km	MPC · JPL
688529	2012 UG_{112}	—	January 16, 2009	Mount Lemmon	Mount Lemmon Survey	KOR	1.1 km	MPC · JPL
688530	2012 UV_{113}	—	October 22, 2012	Mount Lemmon	Mount Lemmon Survey	·	1.3 km	MPC · JPL
688531	2012 UX_{115}	—	September 18, 2003	Palomar	NEAT	·	1.4 km	MPC · JPL
688532	2012 UQ_{118}	—	October 14, 2007	Mount Lemmon	Mount Lemmon Survey	HOF	2.1 km	MPC · JPL
688533	2012 US_{119}	—	October 22, 2012	Haleakala	Pan-STARRS 1	·	1.4 km	MPC · JPL
688534	2012 UY_{121}	—	October 22, 2012	Haleakala	Pan-STARRS 1	·	1.7 km	MPC · JPL
688535	2012 UN_{124}	—	October 15, 2012	Kitt Peak	Spacewatch	·	1.7 km	MPC · JPL
688536	2012 UU_{126}	—	October 22, 2012	Haleakala	Pan-STARRS 1	·	560 m	MPC · JPL
688537	2012 UE_{142}	—	October 18, 2012	Haleakala	Pan-STARRS 1	PAD	1.3 km	MPC · JPL
688538	2012 UN_{143}	—	October 18, 2012	Haleakala	Pan-STARRS 1	·	1.5 km	MPC · JPL
688539	2012 UT_{143}	—	October 8, 2012	Haleakala	Pan-STARRS 1	·	660 m	MPC · JPL
688540	2012 UJ_{144}	—	May 31, 2011	Mount Lemmon	Mount Lemmon Survey	·	1.3 km	MPC · JPL
688541	2012 UN_{149}	—	September 10, 2007	Mount Lemmon	Mount Lemmon Survey	·	1.6 km	MPC · JPL
688542	2012 UW_{152}	—	October 21, 2012	Haleakala	Pan-STARRS 1	(5)	1.2 km	MPC · JPL
688543	2012 US_{155}	—	August 25, 2003	Palomar	NEAT	·	1.6 km	MPC · JPL
688544	2012 UU_{156}	—	October 11, 2012	Haleakala	Pan-STARRS 1	·	590 m	MPC · JPL
688545	2012 UY_{157}	—	October 22, 2012	Haleakala	Pan-STARRS 1	·	760 m	MPC · JPL
688546	2012 UE_{158}	—	October 24, 2012	Haleakala	Pan-STARRS 1	H	410 m	MPC · JPL
688547	2012 UQ_{159}	—	December 20, 2004	Mount Lemmon	Mount Lemmon Survey	·	1.6 km	MPC · JPL
688548	2012 UC_{163}	—	February 1, 2005	Kitt Peak	Spacewatch	·	1.7 km	MPC · JPL
688549	2012 UZ_{163}	—	October 15, 2012	Mount Lemmon	Mount Lemmon Survey	·	1.4 km	MPC · JPL
688550	2012 UC_{166}	—	October 26, 2012	Haleakala	Pan-STARRS 1	H	360 m	MPC · JPL
688551	2012 UP_{168}	—	October 21, 2012	Piszkés-tető	K. Sárneczky, G. Hodosán	EOS	1.9 km	MPC · JPL
688552	2012 UV_{172}	—	October 11, 2005	Uccle	P. De Cat	PHO	800 m	MPC · JPL
688553	2012 UH_{173}	—	October 26, 2012	Mount Lemmon	Mount Lemmon Survey	(18466)	1.9 km	MPC · JPL
688554	2012 UW_{174}	—	October 8, 2012	Kitt Peak	Spacewatch	·	1.3 km	MPC · JPL
688555	2012 UH_{178}	—	April 30, 2011	Mount Lemmon	Mount Lemmon Survey	H	360 m	MPC · JPL
688556	2012 UP_{179}	—	October 20, 2012	Kitt Peak	Spacewatch	·	1.2 km	MPC · JPL
688557	2012 UU_{180}	—	October 16, 2012	Mount Lemmon	Mount Lemmon Survey	·	1.4 km	MPC · JPL
688558	2012 UE_{181}	—	September 5, 2007	Siding Spring	K. Sárneczky, L. Kiss	·	1.6 km	MPC · JPL
688559	2012 UW_{181}	—	October 18, 2012	Haleakala	Pan-STARRS 1	·	1.4 km	MPC · JPL
688560	2012 UY_{181}	—	October 18, 2012	Haleakala	Pan-STARRS 1	AGN	850 m	MPC · JPL
688561	2012 UJ_{182}	—	October 21, 2012	Kitt Peak	Spacewatch	·	1.5 km	MPC · JPL
688562	2012 UM_{182}	—	October 21, 2012	Haleakala	Pan-STARRS 1	HOF	2.2 km	MPC · JPL
688563	2012 UM_{183}	—	October 22, 2012	Haleakala	Pan-STARRS 1	KOR	960 m	MPC · JPL
688564	2012 UV_{183}	—	October 17, 2012	Mount Lemmon	Mount Lemmon Survey	·	1.2 km	MPC · JPL
688565	2012 UV_{184}	—	October 18, 2012	Haleakala	Pan-STARRS 1	·	1.1 km	MPC · JPL
688566	2012 UG_{186}	—	October 19, 2012	Haleakala	Pan-STARRS 1	·	1.8 km	MPC · JPL
688567	2012 UA_{187}	—	October 20, 2012	Haleakala	Pan-STARRS 1	·	1.6 km	MPC · JPL
688568	2012 UD_{187}	—	October 16, 2012	Mount Lemmon	Mount Lemmon Survey	·	580 m	MPC · JPL
688569	2012 UF_{188}	—	April 5, 2014	Haleakala	Pan-STARRS 1	·	510 m	MPC · JPL
688570	2012 UU_{188}	—	October 18, 2012	Haleakala	Pan-STARRS 1	EOS	1.3 km	MPC · JPL
688571	2012 UK_{189}	—	April 22, 2015	Kitt Peak	Spacewatch	·	1.8 km	MPC · JPL
688572	2012 UO_{190}	—	October 21, 2012	Haleakala	Pan-STARRS 1	·	1.2 km	MPC · JPL
688573	2012 UF_{201}	—	January 3, 2014	Kitt Peak	Spacewatch	EOS	1.7 km	MPC · JPL
688574	2012 UK_{201}	—	August 22, 2017	Haleakala	Pan-STARRS 1	·	2.1 km	MPC · JPL
688575	2012 UM_{205}	—	October 22, 2012	Haleakala	Pan-STARRS 1	·	550 m	MPC · JPL
688576	2012 UZ_{206}	—	May 21, 2015	Cerro Tololo	DECam	AGN	880 m	MPC · JPL
688577	2012 UO_{209}	—	May 23, 2014	Haleakala	Pan-STARRS 1	·	560 m	MPC · JPL
688578	2012 UQ_{209}	—	October 18, 2012	Haleakala	Pan-STARRS 1	·	1.5 km	MPC · JPL
688579	2012 UT_{210}	—	January 18, 2009	Kitt Peak	Spacewatch	·	2.0 km	MPC · JPL
688580	2012 UH_{211}	—	January 2, 2009	Kitt Peak	Spacewatch	·	1.5 km	MPC · JPL
688581	2012 UX_{212}	—	October 22, 2012	Kitt Peak	Spacewatch	AGN	770 m	MPC · JPL
688582	2012 UO_{213}	—	October 22, 2012	Kitt Peak	Spacewatch	·	1.3 km	MPC · JPL
688583	2012 UP_{214}	—	October 26, 2012	Mount Lemmon	Mount Lemmon Survey	HOF	2.1 km	MPC · JPL
688584	2012 UR_{219}	—	October 23, 2012	Kitt Peak	Spacewatch	·	1.3 km	MPC · JPL
688585	2012 UV_{219}	—	October 17, 2012	Haleakala	Pan-STARRS 1	·	1.2 km	MPC · JPL
688586	2012 UH_{220}	—	October 22, 2012	Mount Lemmon	Mount Lemmon Survey	·	1.4 km	MPC · JPL
688587	2012 UF_{221}	—	October 18, 2012	Haleakala	Pan-STARRS 1	·	1.2 km	MPC · JPL
688588	2012 UB_{223}	—	October 21, 2012	Haleakala	Pan-STARRS 1	·	1.5 km	MPC · JPL
688589	2012 UN_{223}	—	October 18, 2012	Haleakala	Pan-STARRS 1	·	780 m	MPC · JPL
688590	2012 UL_{224}	—	October 21, 2012	Mount Lemmon	Mount Lemmon Survey	·	1.6 km	MPC · JPL
688591	2012 UM_{226}	—	October 18, 2012	Haleakala	Pan-STARRS 1	HOF	1.7 km	MPC · JPL
688592	2012 UH_{228}	—	October 16, 2012	Mount Lemmon	Mount Lemmon Survey	·	420 m	MPC · JPL
688593	2012 UO_{228}	—	October 8, 2012	Kitt Peak	Spacewatch	·	1.6 km	MPC · JPL
688594	2012 UD_{231}	—	October 17, 2012	Mount Lemmon	Mount Lemmon Survey	·	1.5 km	MPC · JPL
688595	2012 UQ_{232}	—	October 17, 2012	Mount Lemmon	Mount Lemmon Survey	·	1.5 km	MPC · JPL
688596	2012 US_{232}	—	October 23, 2012	Kitt Peak	Spacewatch	·	1.5 km	MPC · JPL
688597	2012 UK_{234}	—	October 22, 2012	Haleakala	Pan-STARRS 1	·	1.2 km	MPC · JPL
688598	2012 UB_{237}	—	October 17, 2012	Haleakala	Pan-STARRS 1	·	1.5 km	MPC · JPL
688599	2012 UD_{237}	—	October 22, 2012	Mount Lemmon	Mount Lemmon Survey	HOF	1.8 km	MPC · JPL
688600	2012 UN_{237}	—	October 23, 2012	Mount Lemmon	Mount Lemmon Survey	·	1.6 km	MPC · JPL

== 688601–688700 ==
back to top

Designation			Discovery			Properties		Ref
Permanent	Provisional	Named after	Date	Site	Discoverer(s)	Category	Diam.	Ref
688601	2012 UX_{237}	—	October 17, 2012	Mount Lemmon	Mount Lemmon Survey	HOF	2.2 km	MPC · JPL
688602	2012 UB_{238}	—	October 22, 2012	Haleakala	Pan-STARRS 1	·	1.6 km	MPC · JPL
688603	2012 UW_{238}	—	October 18, 2012	Haleakala	Pan-STARRS 1	AGN	880 m	MPC · JPL
688604	2012 UY_{238}	—	October 19, 2012	Haleakala	Pan-STARRS 1	·	1.6 km	MPC · JPL
688605	2012 UD_{240}	—	October 18, 2012	Haleakala	Pan-STARRS 1	·	530 m	MPC · JPL
688606	2012 UM_{240}	—	October 17, 2012	Haleakala	Pan-STARRS 1	·	530 m	MPC · JPL
688607	2012 UO_{240}	—	October 18, 2012	Haleakala	Pan-STARRS 1	·	1.5 km	MPC · JPL
688608	2012 UT_{240}	—	October 23, 2012	Mount Lemmon	Mount Lemmon Survey	·	1.4 km	MPC · JPL
688609	2012 UU_{240}	—	October 16, 2012	Mount Lemmon	Mount Lemmon Survey	·	1.4 km	MPC · JPL
688610	2012 UF_{242}	—	October 18, 2012	Haleakala	Pan-STARRS 1	·	1.3 km	MPC · JPL
688611	2012 UX_{242}	—	October 17, 2012	Haleakala	Pan-STARRS 1	AST	1.1 km	MPC · JPL
688612	2012 UW_{243}	—	October 17, 2012	Haleakala	Pan-STARRS 1	·	480 m	MPC · JPL
688613	2012 UQ_{244}	—	October 22, 2012	Mount Lemmon	Mount Lemmon Survey	·	1.3 km	MPC · JPL
688614	2012 UT_{244}	—	August 23, 2007	Kitt Peak	Spacewatch	·	1.4 km	MPC · JPL
688615	2012 UZ_{253}	—	October 19, 2012	Mount Lemmon	Mount Lemmon Survey	·	1.5 km	MPC · JPL
688616	2012 VF_{8}	—	October 21, 2012	Kitt Peak	Spacewatch	·	1.3 km	MPC · JPL
688617	2012 VL_{11}	—	October 8, 2012	Kitt Peak	Spacewatch	HOF	1.8 km	MPC · JPL
688618	2012 VY_{11}	—	October 18, 2012	Haleakala	Pan-STARRS 1	·	1.5 km	MPC · JPL
688619	2012 VU_{13}	—	November 4, 2012	Mount Lemmon	Mount Lemmon Survey	HOF	2.0 km	MPC · JPL
688620	2012 VT_{15}	—	September 11, 2002	Palomar	NEAT	·	660 m	MPC · JPL
688621	2012 VF_{18}	—	November 6, 2012	Mount Lemmon	Mount Lemmon Survey	·	1.8 km	MPC · JPL
688622	2012 VP_{20}	—	September 16, 2012	Kitt Peak	Spacewatch	·	1.5 km	MPC · JPL
688623	2012 VC_{21}	—	November 30, 2003	Kitt Peak	Spacewatch	AST	1.4 km	MPC · JPL
688624	2012 VV_{21}	—	October 23, 2012	Kitt Peak	Spacewatch	·	1.5 km	MPC · JPL
688625	2012 VT_{28}	—	November 2, 2012	Mount Lemmon	Mount Lemmon Survey	·	1.5 km	MPC · JPL
688626	2012 VA_{29}	—	October 11, 2012	Kitt Peak	Spacewatch	PAD	1.3 km	MPC · JPL
688627	2012 VF_{29}	—	November 2, 2012	Mount Lemmon	Mount Lemmon Survey	MRX	940 m	MPC · JPL
688628	2012 VD_{32}	—	October 8, 2012	Kitt Peak	Spacewatch	·	530 m	MPC · JPL
688629	2012 VM_{41}	—	October 18, 2012	Haleakala	Pan-STARRS 1	·	1.4 km	MPC · JPL
688630	2012 VX_{48}	—	November 4, 2012	Mount Lemmon	Mount Lemmon Survey	·	1.2 km	MPC · JPL
688631	2012 VK_{50}	—	October 18, 2012	Haleakala	Pan-STARRS 1	·	1.5 km	MPC · JPL
688632	2012 VU_{50}	—	September 23, 2012	Mount Lemmon	Mount Lemmon Survey	·	1.5 km	MPC · JPL
688633	2012 VH_{52}	—	November 5, 2005	Catalina	CSS	·	650 m	MPC · JPL
688634	2012 VW_{53}	—	November 6, 2012	Mount Lemmon	Mount Lemmon Survey	HOF	2.1 km	MPC · JPL
688635	2012 VQ_{54}	—	September 13, 2007	Mount Lemmon	Mount Lemmon Survey	AGN	1.1 km	MPC · JPL
688636	2012 VW_{55}	—	September 24, 2004	Kitt Peak	Spacewatch	·	780 m	MPC · JPL
688637	2012 VG_{56}	—	November 6, 2012	Mount Lemmon	Mount Lemmon Survey	AGN	920 m	MPC · JPL
688638	2012 VD_{57}	—	November 7, 2012	Haleakala	Pan-STARRS 1	NEM	1.8 km	MPC · JPL
688639	2012 VR_{59}	—	November 7, 2012	Haleakala	Pan-STARRS 1	·	420 m	MPC · JPL
688640	2012 VU_{61}	—	October 21, 2012	Haleakala	Pan-STARRS 1	AGN	800 m	MPC · JPL
688641	2012 VO_{62}	—	September 18, 2012	Mount Lemmon	Mount Lemmon Survey	·	2.6 km	MPC · JPL
688642	2012 VD_{66}	—	September 18, 2007	Mount Lemmon	Mount Lemmon Survey	HOF	2.0 km	MPC · JPL
688643	2012 VR_{69}	—	October 23, 2003	Kitt Peak	Spacewatch	·	1.2 km	MPC · JPL
688644	2012 VU_{69}	—	November 7, 2012	Haleakala	Pan-STARRS 1	·	1.6 km	MPC · JPL
688645	2012 VG_{70}	—	October 20, 2012	Mount Lemmon	Mount Lemmon Survey	·	1.8 km	MPC · JPL
688646	2012 VZ_{70}	—	October 21, 2012	Haleakala	Pan-STARRS 1	GEF	820 m	MPC · JPL
688647	2012 VU_{71}	—	September 30, 2003	Kitt Peak	Spacewatch	EUN	1.1 km	MPC · JPL
688648	2012 VL_{73}	—	October 30, 2011	Mount Lemmon	Mount Lemmon Survey	3:2	5.3 km	MPC · JPL
688649	2012 VV_{73}	—	September 14, 2007	Mauna Kea	P. A. Wiegert	·	1.6 km	MPC · JPL
688650	2012 VY_{77}	—	November 12, 2012	Haleakala	Pan-STARRS 1	·	1.4 km	MPC · JPL
688651	2012 VA_{78}	—	October 20, 2012	Mount Lemmon	Mount Lemmon Survey	·	1.7 km	MPC · JPL
688652	2012 VG_{80}	—	November 6, 2012	Alder Springs	Levin, K.	·	510 m	MPC · JPL
688653	2012 VR_{81}	—	September 27, 2008	Mount Lemmon	Mount Lemmon Survey	·	910 m	MPC · JPL
688654	2012 VF_{85}	—	November 14, 2012	Kitt Peak	Spacewatch	AST	1.5 km	MPC · JPL
688655	2012 VA_{86}	—	January 17, 2009	Mount Lemmon	Mount Lemmon Survey	·	1.4 km	MPC · JPL
688656	2012 VW_{87}	—	May 20, 2006	Kitt Peak	Spacewatch	·	930 m	MPC · JPL
688657	2012 VR_{89}	—	November 14, 2012	Kitt Peak	Spacewatch	·	1.6 km	MPC · JPL
688658	2012 VK_{91}	—	October 16, 2003	Palomar	NEAT	EUN	1.1 km	MPC · JPL
688659	2012 VL_{91}	—	October 14, 2012	Kitt Peak	Spacewatch	·	460 m	MPC · JPL
688660	2012 VT_{107}	—	October 23, 2012	Mount Lemmon	Mount Lemmon Survey	·	1.2 km	MPC · JPL
688661	2012 VO_{108}	—	September 13, 2007	Mount Lemmon	Mount Lemmon Survey	·	1.3 km	MPC · JPL
688662	2012 VR_{108}	—	October 22, 2012	Haleakala	Pan-STARRS 1	·	1.8 km	MPC · JPL
688663	2012 VQ_{112}	—	November 4, 2012	Mount Lemmon	Mount Lemmon Survey	KOR	950 m	MPC · JPL
688664	2012 VK_{116}	—	January 25, 2014	Haleakala	Pan-STARRS 1	·	1.6 km	MPC · JPL
688665	2012 VM_{116}	—	November 13, 2012	Mount Lemmon	Mount Lemmon Survey	·	640 m	MPC · JPL
688666	2012 VZ_{116}	—	November 4, 2012	Haleakala	Pan-STARRS 1	·	1.3 km	MPC · JPL
688667	2012 VL_{117}	—	February 20, 2014	Mount Lemmon	Mount Lemmon Survey	·	1.3 km	MPC · JPL
688668	2012 VM_{117}	—	November 7, 2012	Mount Lemmon	Mount Lemmon Survey	·	550 m	MPC · JPL
688669	2012 VS_{117}	—	August 11, 2007	Saint-Sulpice	B. Christophe	·	1.2 km	MPC · JPL
688670	2012 VE_{120}	—	November 7, 2012	Mount Lemmon	Mount Lemmon Survey	·	1.3 km	MPC · JPL
688671	2012 VR_{121}	—	November 7, 2012	Kitt Peak	Spacewatch	3:2	4.8 km	MPC · JPL
688672	2012 VY_{122}	—	November 7, 2012	Haleakala	Pan-STARRS 1	T_{j} (2.99) · 3:2	4.6 km	MPC · JPL
688673	2012 VO_{124}	—	August 26, 2016	Haleakala	Pan-STARRS 1	·	1.4 km	MPC · JPL
688674	2012 VS_{124}	—	November 9, 2013	Mount Lemmon	Mount Lemmon Survey	L5	5.6 km	MPC · JPL
688675	2012 VC_{126}	—	April 23, 2014	Cerro Tololo	DECam	·	460 m	MPC · JPL
688676	2012 VZ_{127}	—	November 13, 2012	ESA OGS	ESA OGS	·	1.3 km	MPC · JPL
688677	2012 VA_{128}	—	November 7, 2012	Haleakala	Pan-STARRS 1	·	1.4 km	MPC · JPL
688678	2012 VP_{128}	—	November 13, 2012	Mount Lemmon	Mount Lemmon Survey	HOF	2.3 km	MPC · JPL
688679	2012 VS_{128}	—	November 13, 2012	Mount Lemmon	Mount Lemmon Survey	·	1.2 km	MPC · JPL
688680	2012 VX_{128}	—	November 13, 2012	Mount Lemmon	Mount Lemmon Survey	·	1.3 km	MPC · JPL
688681	2012 VK_{129}	—	November 7, 2012	Haleakala	Pan-STARRS 1	·	1.4 km	MPC · JPL
688682	2012 VL_{130}	—	November 6, 2012	Mount Lemmon	Mount Lemmon Survey	·	1.4 km	MPC · JPL
688683	2012 VM_{135}	—	November 7, 2012	Mount Lemmon	Mount Lemmon Survey	·	1.9 km	MPC · JPL
688684	2012 VN_{135}	—	November 14, 2012	Kitt Peak	Spacewatch	·	1.3 km	MPC · JPL
688685	2012 VV_{137}	—	November 14, 2012	Mount Lemmon	Mount Lemmon Survey	·	1.4 km	MPC · JPL
688686	2012 VY_{137}	—	November 3, 2012	Mount Lemmon	Mount Lemmon Survey	AGN	950 m	MPC · JPL
688687	2012 VA_{138}	—	November 6, 2012	Mount Lemmon	Mount Lemmon Survey	·	1.5 km	MPC · JPL
688688	2012 VC_{138}	—	November 13, 2012	Mount Lemmon	Mount Lemmon Survey	·	1.6 km	MPC · JPL
688689	2012 VH_{138}	—	November 3, 2012	Mount Lemmon	Mount Lemmon Survey	·	1.1 km	MPC · JPL
688690	2012 VM_{138}	—	November 4, 2012	Mount Lemmon	Mount Lemmon Survey	·	1.5 km	MPC · JPL
688691	2012 VO_{138}	—	November 13, 2012	ESA OGS	ESA OGS	·	1.4 km	MPC · JPL
688692	2012 VT_{139}	—	November 4, 2012	Mount Lemmon	Mount Lemmon Survey	·	1.2 km	MPC · JPL
688693	2012 VW_{140}	—	November 12, 2012	Mount Lemmon	Mount Lemmon Survey	·	1.4 km	MPC · JPL
688694	2012 VH_{141}	—	November 6, 2012	Haleakala	Pan-STARRS 1	·	1.4 km	MPC · JPL
688695	2012 VM_{141}	—	November 6, 2012	Mount Lemmon	Mount Lemmon Survey	·	1.5 km	MPC · JPL
688696 Bertiau	2012 VH_{143}	Bertiau	November 13, 2012	Mount Graham	K. Černis, R. P. Boyle	·	1.6 km	MPC · JPL
688697	2012 VF_{144}	—	November 14, 2012	Kitt Peak	Spacewatch	3:2	4.0 km	MPC · JPL
688698	2012 WJ_{1}	—	November 12, 2012	Catalina	CSS	·	600 m	MPC · JPL
688699	2012 WC_{7}	—	November 17, 2012	Mount Lemmon	Mount Lemmon Survey	·	1.3 km	MPC · JPL
688700	2012 WZ_{9}	—	October 22, 2012	Haleakala	Pan-STARRS 1	HOF	1.8 km	MPC · JPL

== 688701–688800 ==
back to top

Designation			Discovery			Properties		Ref
Permanent	Provisional	Named after	Date	Site	Discoverer(s)	Category	Diam.	Ref
688701	2012 WC_{11}	—	April 29, 2008	Mount Lemmon	Mount Lemmon Survey	·	570 m	MPC · JPL
688702	2012 WH_{17}	—	October 9, 2012	Mount Lemmon	Mount Lemmon Survey	·	570 m	MPC · JPL
688703	2012 WS_{22}	—	November 20, 2012	Mount Lemmon	Mount Lemmon Survey	·	1.4 km	MPC · JPL
688704	2012 WT_{27}	—	December 19, 2009	Kitt Peak	Spacewatch	·	690 m	MPC · JPL
688705	2012 WM_{29}	—	January 18, 2009	Kitt Peak	Spacewatch	·	1.4 km	MPC · JPL
688706	2012 WL_{35}	—	November 26, 2012	Mount Lemmon	Mount Lemmon Survey	·	1.9 km	MPC · JPL
688707	2012 WY_{36}	—	November 23, 2012	Kitt Peak	Spacewatch	·	1.5 km	MPC · JPL
688708	2012 WD_{37}	—	November 28, 2012	Haleakala	Pan-STARRS 1	other TNO	159 km	MPC · JPL
688709	2012 WR_{37}	—	November 26, 2012	Mount Lemmon	Mount Lemmon Survey	·	490 m	MPC · JPL
688710	2012 WM_{40}	—	November 19, 2003	Kitt Peak	Spacewatch	·	1.4 km	MPC · JPL
688711	2012 WM_{42}	—	November 22, 2012	Kitt Peak	Spacewatch	·	1.2 km	MPC · JPL
688712	2012 WE_{43}	—	November 25, 2012	Kitt Peak	Spacewatch	·	1.6 km	MPC · JPL
688713	2012 WA_{44}	—	November 23, 2012	Kitt Peak	Spacewatch	KOR	1.2 km	MPC · JPL
688714	2012 WF_{44}	—	November 23, 2012	Kitt Peak	Spacewatch	HOF	2.0 km	MPC · JPL
688715	2012 WJ_{44}	—	November 20, 2012	Mount Lemmon	Mount Lemmon Survey	·	1.2 km	MPC · JPL
688716	2012 XF_{1}	—	July 3, 2011	Mount Lemmon	Mount Lemmon Survey	·	1.7 km	MPC · JPL
688717	2012 XL_{2}	—	September 4, 2003	Kitt Peak	Spacewatch	·	1.1 km	MPC · JPL
688718	2012 XK_{3}	—	November 25, 2005	Kitt Peak	Spacewatch	·	480 m	MPC · JPL
688719	2012 XV_{4}	—	December 4, 2012	Mount Lemmon	Mount Lemmon Survey	·	1.5 km	MPC · JPL
688720	2012 XF_{7}	—	August 5, 2002	Palomar	NEAT	·	1.9 km	MPC · JPL
688721	2012 XQ_{12}	—	December 4, 2012	Mount Lemmon	Mount Lemmon Survey	·	1.6 km	MPC · JPL
688722	2012 XU_{14}	—	October 23, 2003	Kitt Peak	Spacewatch	JUN	810 m	MPC · JPL
688723	2012 XG_{17}	—	December 7, 2012	Haleakala	Pan-STARRS 1	H	500 m	MPC · JPL
688724	2012 XX_{19}	—	September 13, 2007	Kitt Peak	Spacewatch	·	1.4 km	MPC · JPL
688725	2012 XQ_{21}	—	October 23, 2012	Mount Lemmon	Mount Lemmon Survey	·	1.3 km	MPC · JPL
688726	2012 XJ_{22}	—	May 22, 2011	Mount Lemmon	Mount Lemmon Survey	·	570 m	MPC · JPL
688727	2012 XQ_{22}	—	November 7, 2012	Mount Lemmon	Mount Lemmon Survey	AGN	1.1 km	MPC · JPL
688728	2012 XZ_{23}	—	November 20, 2003	Kitt Peak	Spacewatch	·	1.3 km	MPC · JPL
688729	2012 XO_{25}	—	May 25, 2006	Mauna Kea	P. A. Wiegert	·	1.7 km	MPC · JPL
688730	2012 XM_{27}	—	September 30, 2016	Haleakala	Pan-STARRS 1	·	1.4 km	MPC · JPL
688731	2012 XH_{29}	—	October 8, 2007	Mount Lemmon	Mount Lemmon Survey	AGN	910 m	MPC · JPL
688732	2012 XM_{30}	—	November 13, 2012	Kitt Peak	Spacewatch	·	1.7 km	MPC · JPL
688733	2012 XV_{31}	—	November 6, 2012	Kitt Peak	Spacewatch	·	1.7 km	MPC · JPL
688734	2012 XA_{32}	—	December 1, 2005	Mount Lemmon	Mount Lemmon Survey	·	550 m	MPC · JPL
688735	2012 XG_{33}	—	December 3, 2012	Mount Lemmon	Mount Lemmon Survey	·	1.3 km	MPC · JPL
688736	2012 XH_{33}	—	October 30, 2007	Mount Lemmon	Mount Lemmon Survey	AST	1.4 km	MPC · JPL
688737	2012 XO_{33}	—	December 3, 2012	Mount Lemmon	Mount Lemmon Survey	GEF	930 m	MPC · JPL
688738	2012 XJ_{34}	—	December 3, 2012	Mount Lemmon	Mount Lemmon Survey	AGN	910 m	MPC · JPL
688739	2012 XQ_{34}	—	October 15, 2002	Palomar	NEAT	·	540 m	MPC · JPL
688740	2012 XE_{36}	—	December 3, 2012	Mount Lemmon	Mount Lemmon Survey	·	1.7 km	MPC · JPL
688741	2012 XS_{37}	—	November 30, 2005	Kitt Peak	Spacewatch	·	570 m	MPC · JPL
688742	2012 XC_{39}	—	October 20, 2007	Mount Lemmon	Mount Lemmon Survey	KOR	1.2 km	MPC · JPL
688743	2012 XF_{39}	—	November 6, 2012	Mount Lemmon	Mount Lemmon Survey	·	1.9 km	MPC · JPL
688744	2012 XZ_{42}	—	December 3, 2012	Mount Lemmon	Mount Lemmon Survey	·	1.4 km	MPC · JPL
688745	2012 XB_{44}	—	December 19, 2003	Kitt Peak	Spacewatch	·	1.8 km	MPC · JPL
688746	2012 XK_{51}	—	November 4, 2012	Kitt Peak	Spacewatch	·	620 m	MPC · JPL
688747	2012 XX_{53}	—	December 7, 2012	Mount Lemmon	Mount Lemmon Survey	·	1.5 km	MPC · JPL
688748	2012 XG_{56}	—	December 10, 2012	Haleakala	Pan-STARRS 1	H	490 m	MPC · JPL
688749	2012 XM_{59}	—	March 10, 2007	Mount Lemmon	Mount Lemmon Survey	·	530 m	MPC · JPL
688750	2012 XU_{59}	—	November 17, 2012	Mount Lemmon	Mount Lemmon Survey	HOF	2.3 km	MPC · JPL
688751	2012 XP_{60}	—	October 21, 2012	Haleakala	Pan-STARRS 1	AGN	1.0 km	MPC · JPL
688752	2012 XB_{63}	—	November 14, 2012	Mount Lemmon	Mount Lemmon Survey	·	1.7 km	MPC · JPL
688753	2012 XB_{66}	—	December 4, 2012	Mount Lemmon	Mount Lemmon Survey	EOS	1.5 km	MPC · JPL
688754	2012 XO_{67}	—	October 23, 2003	Apache Point	SDSS	·	1.4 km	MPC · JPL
688755	2012 XJ_{68}	—	December 5, 2012	Mount Lemmon	Mount Lemmon Survey	·	1.8 km	MPC · JPL
688756	2012 XP_{68}	—	January 19, 2004	Kitt Peak	Spacewatch	·	1.3 km	MPC · JPL
688757	2012 XY_{73}	—	December 6, 2012	Mount Lemmon	Mount Lemmon Survey	KOR	940 m	MPC · JPL
688758	2012 XV_{74}	—	December 6, 2012	Mount Lemmon	Mount Lemmon Survey	·	2.0 km	MPC · JPL
688759	2012 XS_{77}	—	December 6, 2012	Mount Lemmon	Mount Lemmon Survey	AGN	780 m	MPC · JPL
688760	2012 XV_{77}	—	December 6, 2012	Mount Lemmon	Mount Lemmon Survey	·	2.1 km	MPC · JPL
688761	2012 XV_{78}	—	December 6, 2012	Mount Lemmon	Mount Lemmon Survey	·	1.5 km	MPC · JPL
688762	2012 XE_{87}	—	January 10, 2010	Kitt Peak	Spacewatch	·	550 m	MPC · JPL
688763	2012 XG_{89}	—	October 27, 2008	Mount Lemmon	Mount Lemmon Survey	·	1.3 km	MPC · JPL
688764	2012 XR_{89}	—	May 21, 2006	Siding Spring	SSS	·	2.0 km	MPC · JPL
688765	2012 XS_{89}	—	November 12, 2012	Mount Lemmon	Mount Lemmon Survey	·	1.1 km	MPC · JPL
688766	2012 XB_{90}	—	September 18, 2007	Kitt Peak	Spacewatch	AGN	930 m	MPC · JPL
688767	2012 XC_{92}	—	November 7, 2012	Mount Lemmon	Mount Lemmon Survey	·	1.6 km	MPC · JPL
688768	2012 XV_{97}	—	January 14, 2002	Kitt Peak	Spacewatch	·	1.2 km	MPC · JPL
688769	2012 XW_{97}	—	December 5, 2012	Mount Lemmon	Mount Lemmon Survey	·	500 m	MPC · JPL
688770	2012 XP_{100}	—	August 25, 2000	Cerro Tololo	Deep Ecliptic Survey	·	900 m	MPC · JPL
688771	2012 XY_{104}	—	November 14, 2012	Mount Lemmon	Mount Lemmon Survey	HOF	1.8 km	MPC · JPL
688772	2012 XT_{106}	—	December 12, 2004	Campo Imperatore	CINEOS	·	1.3 km	MPC · JPL
688773	2012 XV_{106}	—	December 8, 2012	Kitt Peak	Spacewatch	H	350 m	MPC · JPL
688774	2012 XX_{109}	—	September 19, 2007	Kitt Peak	Spacewatch	AEO	980 m	MPC · JPL
688775	2012 XH_{111}	—	December 11, 2012	Mount Lemmon	Mount Lemmon Survey	H	520 m	MPC · JPL
688776	2012 XZ_{113}	—	January 29, 2009	Kitt Peak	Spacewatch	·	1.7 km	MPC · JPL
688777	2012 XO_{114}	—	September 12, 2007	Mount Lemmon	Mount Lemmon Survey	·	1.4 km	MPC · JPL
688778	2012 XN_{118}	—	January 16, 2005	Kitt Peak	Spacewatch	·	1.2 km	MPC · JPL
688779	2012 XH_{122}	—	December 9, 2012	Haleakala	Pan-STARRS 1	·	550 m	MPC · JPL
688780	2012 XD_{129}	—	October 10, 2007	Kitt Peak	Spacewatch	·	1.5 km	MPC · JPL
688781	2012 XZ_{147}	—	November 26, 2003	Kitt Peak	Spacewatch	·	1.9 km	MPC · JPL
688782	2012 XS_{148}	—	December 2, 2008	Mount Lemmon	Mount Lemmon Survey	EUN	1.0 km	MPC · JPL
688783	2012 XK_{150}	—	November 22, 2012	Kitt Peak	Spacewatch	·	1.7 km	MPC · JPL
688784	2012 XZ_{153}	—	December 3, 2008	Mount Lemmon	Mount Lemmon Survey	·	1.0 km	MPC · JPL
688785	2012 XK_{154}	—	March 17, 2005	Catalina	CSS	·	1.1 km	MPC · JPL
688786	2012 XA_{157}	—	September 27, 2016	Haleakala	Pan-STARRS 1	·	1.4 km	MPC · JPL
688787	2012 XO_{158}	—	October 12, 2007	Mount Lemmon	Mount Lemmon Survey	·	1.4 km	MPC · JPL
688788	2012 XR_{158}	—	January 13, 2008	Mount Lemmon	Mount Lemmon Survey	·	1.9 km	MPC · JPL
688789	2012 XN_{159}	—	September 14, 2007	Catalina	CSS	EUN	1.2 km	MPC · JPL
688790	2012 XK_{160}	—	March 22, 2015	Haleakala	Pan-STARRS 1	JUN	890 m	MPC · JPL
688791	2012 XK_{161}	—	February 26, 2014	Mount Lemmon	Mount Lemmon Survey	·	1.7 km	MPC · JPL
688792	2012 XG_{162}	—	April 23, 2015	Haleakala	Pan-STARRS 1	·	1.1 km	MPC · JPL
688793	2012 XO_{168}	—	March 21, 2017	Haleakala	Pan-STARRS 1	·	600 m	MPC · JPL
688794	2012 XS_{171}	—	December 2, 2012	Mount Lemmon	Mount Lemmon Survey	·	550 m	MPC · JPL
688795	2012 XT_{171}	—	December 12, 2012	Nogales	M. Schwartz, P. R. Holvorcem	H	490 m	MPC · JPL
688796	2012 XT_{173}	—	December 6, 2012	Mount Lemmon	Mount Lemmon Survey	·	1.5 km	MPC · JPL
688797	2012 XS_{175}	—	December 8, 2012	Mount Lemmon	Mount Lemmon Survey	·	1.5 km	MPC · JPL
688798	2012 XQ_{177}	—	December 12, 2012	Mount Lemmon	Mount Lemmon Survey	·	1.3 km	MPC · JPL
688799	2012 XC_{179}	—	December 9, 2012	Mount Lemmon	Mount Lemmon Survey	·	1.2 km	MPC · JPL
688800	2012 XB_{181}	—	December 9, 2012	Haleakala	Pan-STARRS 1	·	1.7 km	MPC · JPL

== 688801–688900 ==
back to top

Designation			Discovery			Properties		Ref
Permanent	Provisional	Named after	Date	Site	Discoverer(s)	Category	Diam.	Ref
688801	2012 YC	—	December 17, 2012	Nogales	M. Schwartz, P. R. Holvorcem	H	480 m	MPC · JPL
688802	2012 YX	—	August 10, 2001	Palomar	NEAT	·	1.1 km	MPC · JPL
688803	2012 YX_{5}	—	December 23, 2012	Haleakala	Pan-STARRS 1	H	550 m	MPC · JPL
688804	2012 YF_{10}	—	September 14, 2006	Kitt Peak	Spacewatch	·	1.6 km	MPC · JPL
688805	2012 YJ_{10}	—	December 23, 2012	Haleakala	Pan-STARRS 1	·	1.9 km	MPC · JPL
688806	2012 YQ_{11}	—	December 23, 2012	Haleakala	Pan-STARRS 1	·	1.5 km	MPC · JPL
688807	2012 YD_{12}	—	December 17, 2003	Kitt Peak	Spacewatch	·	1.8 km	MPC · JPL
688808	2012 YE_{15}	—	April 29, 2014	Haleakala	Pan-STARRS 1	·	560 m	MPC · JPL
688809	2012 YD_{16}	—	December 23, 2012	Haleakala	Pan-STARRS 1	·	1.3 km	MPC · JPL
688810	2012 YV_{16}	—	December 23, 2012	Haleakala	Pan-STARRS 1	KOR	900 m	MPC · JPL
688811	2012 YM_{17}	—	December 23, 2012	Haleakala	Pan-STARRS 1	EMA	2.4 km	MPC · JPL
688812	2012 YT_{17}	—	December 16, 2012	ESA OGS	ESA OGS	·	500 m	MPC · JPL
688813	2012 YM_{18}	—	December 23, 2012	Haleakala	Pan-STARRS 1	·	1.6 km	MPC · JPL
688814	2012 YD_{19}	—	December 21, 2012	Mount Lemmon	Mount Lemmon Survey	HOF	2.0 km	MPC · JPL
688815	2012 YS_{21}	—	December 21, 2012	Mount Lemmon	Mount Lemmon Survey	·	2.1 km	MPC · JPL
688816	2012 YW_{21}	—	September 26, 2011	Haleakala	Pan-STARRS 1	·	1.4 km	MPC · JPL
688817	2012 YD_{22}	—	December 23, 2012	Haleakala	Pan-STARRS 1	·	460 m	MPC · JPL
688818	2012 YP_{22}	—	December 23, 2012	Haleakala	Pan-STARRS 1	·	1.5 km	MPC · JPL
688819	2012 YE_{23}	—	December 23, 2012	Haleakala	Pan-STARRS 1	·	1.7 km	MPC · JPL
688820	2012 YK_{25}	—	December 23, 2012	Haleakala	Pan-STARRS 1	·	610 m	MPC · JPL
688821	2012 YG_{26}	—	December 23, 2012	Haleakala	Pan-STARRS 1	·	1.7 km	MPC · JPL
688822	2013 AZ	—	January 3, 2013	Catalina	CSS	H	460 m	MPC · JPL
688823	2013 AA_{13}	—	January 3, 2013	Mount Lemmon	Mount Lemmon Survey	·	1.4 km	MPC · JPL
688824	2013 AO_{13}	—	January 3, 2013	Mount Lemmon	Mount Lemmon Survey	·	510 m	MPC · JPL
688825	2013 AS_{13}	—	October 28, 2002	Palomar	NEAT	·	560 m	MPC · JPL
688826	2013 AQ_{16}	—	January 16, 2009	Kitt Peak	Spacewatch	·	1.6 km	MPC · JPL
688827	2013 AS_{17}	—	December 4, 2008	Mount Lemmon	Mount Lemmon Survey	·	1.2 km	MPC · JPL
688828	2013 AC_{18}	—	January 25, 2006	Kitt Peak	Spacewatch	·	750 m	MPC · JPL
688829	2013 AY_{24}	—	October 18, 2007	Kitt Peak	Spacewatch	AST	1.5 km	MPC · JPL
688830	2013 AJ_{25}	—	October 30, 2005	Mount Lemmon	Mount Lemmon Survey	(2076)	580 m	MPC · JPL
688831	2013 AX_{28}	—	December 23, 2012	Haleakala	Pan-STARRS 1	(2076)	600 m	MPC · JPL
688832	2013 AP_{30}	—	December 13, 2012	Mount Lemmon	Mount Lemmon Survey	H	390 m	MPC · JPL
688833	2013 AQ_{32}	—	November 6, 2005	Mount Lemmon	Mount Lemmon Survey	·	590 m	MPC · JPL
688834	2013 AT_{33}	—	October 6, 2008	Mount Lemmon	Mount Lemmon Survey	NYS	620 m	MPC · JPL
688835	2013 AD_{43}	—	August 24, 2008	Kitt Peak	Spacewatch	·	680 m	MPC · JPL
688836	2013 AG_{44}	—	January 5, 2013	Mount Lemmon	Mount Lemmon Survey	·	1.7 km	MPC · JPL
688837	2013 AV_{46}	—	December 8, 2012	Mount Lemmon	Mount Lemmon Survey	H	380 m	MPC · JPL
688838	2013 AQ_{47}	—	March 19, 2009	Mount Lemmon	Mount Lemmon Survey	·	1.9 km	MPC · JPL
688839	2013 AX_{55}	—	September 23, 2008	Kitt Peak	Spacewatch	·	750 m	MPC · JPL
688840	2013 AP_{59}	—	January 7, 2013	Haleakala	Pan-STARRS 1	·	2.6 km	MPC · JPL
688841	2013 AV_{60}	—	January 9, 2013	Catalina	CSS	APO	630 m	MPC · JPL
688842	2013 AB_{63}	—	November 3, 2007	Mount Lemmon	Mount Lemmon Survey	·	1.6 km	MPC · JPL
688843	2013 AM_{63}	—	January 6, 2013	Mount Lemmon	Mount Lemmon Survey	·	1.4 km	MPC · JPL
688844	2013 AS_{64}	—	January 10, 2013	Haleakala	Pan-STARRS 1	L4	6.7 km	MPC · JPL
688845	2013 AC_{65}	—	January 4, 2013	Mount Lemmon	Mount Lemmon Survey	·	1.7 km	MPC · JPL
688846	2013 AD_{65}	—	September 5, 2008	Kitt Peak	Spacewatch	·	670 m	MPC · JPL
688847	2013 AQ_{65}	—	May 5, 2010	Mount Lemmon	Mount Lemmon Survey	·	1.5 km	MPC · JPL
688848	2013 AL_{77}	—	September 21, 2003	Kitt Peak	Spacewatch	·	1 km	MPC · JPL
688849	2013 AO_{77}	—	January 4, 2013	Kitt Peak	Spacewatch	·	780 m	MPC · JPL
688850	2013 AW_{78}	—	January 10, 2013	Haleakala	Pan-STARRS 1	·	1.5 km	MPC · JPL
688851	2013 AF_{81}	—	January 12, 2013	Mount Lemmon	Mount Lemmon Survey	KOR	1.0 km	MPC · JPL
688852	2013 AR_{85}	—	September 4, 2011	Haleakala	Pan-STARRS 1	·	1.6 km	MPC · JPL
688853	2013 AG_{88}	—	December 23, 2012	Haleakala	Pan-STARRS 1	·	1.5 km	MPC · JPL
688854	2013 AO_{89}	—	January 15, 2013	ESA OGS	ESA OGS	·	1.7 km	MPC · JPL
688855	2013 AB_{97}	—	September 27, 2012	Haleakala	Pan-STARRS 1	·	2.4 km	MPC · JPL
688856	2013 AN_{98}	—	January 6, 2013	Mount Lemmon	Mount Lemmon Survey	H	420 m	MPC · JPL
688857	2013 AE_{106}	—	January 10, 2013	Haleakala	Pan-STARRS 1	·	1.4 km	MPC · JPL
688858	2013 AS_{106}	—	January 10, 2013	Haleakala	Pan-STARRS 1	L4	6.9 km	MPC · JPL
688859	2013 AO_{107}	—	January 10, 2013	Haleakala	Pan-STARRS 1	·	590 m	MPC · JPL
688860	2013 AV_{112}	—	April 18, 2001	Kitt Peak	Spacewatch	MIS	2.2 km	MPC · JPL
688861	2013 AL_{113}	—	January 13, 2013	Mount Lemmon	Mount Lemmon Survey	·	1.3 km	MPC · JPL
688862	2013 AA_{118}	—	January 15, 2013	ESA OGS	ESA OGS	·	1.4 km	MPC · JPL
688863	2013 AQ_{123}	—	January 14, 2013	Oukaïmeden	M. Ory	TIR	1.7 km	MPC · JPL
688864	2013 AH_{128}	—	December 11, 2012	Mount Lemmon	Mount Lemmon Survey	·	570 m	MPC · JPL
688865	2013 AG_{135}	—	September 28, 2011	Kitt Peak	Spacewatch	·	1.7 km	MPC · JPL
688866	2013 AW_{135}	—	January 10, 2013	Haleakala	Pan-STARRS 1	·	1.5 km	MPC · JPL
688867	2013 AE_{138}	—	January 13, 2013	Mount Lemmon	Mount Lemmon Survey	·	1.5 km	MPC · JPL
688868	2013 AU_{148}	—	November 5, 2007	Kitt Peak	Spacewatch	·	1.1 km	MPC · JPL
688869	2013 AC_{151}	—	January 4, 2013	Cerro Tololo-DECam	DECam	·	2.0 km	MPC · JPL
688870	2013 AQ_{152}	—	October 21, 2006	Kitt Peak	Spacewatch	·	1.5 km	MPC · JPL
688871	2013 AU_{154}	—	January 20, 2013	Mount Lemmon	Mount Lemmon Survey	·	1.8 km	MPC · JPL
688872	2013 AV_{156}	—	January 4, 2013	Cerro Tololo-DECam	DECam	·	2.1 km	MPC · JPL
688873	2013 AF_{160}	—	January 4, 2013	Cerro Tololo-DECam	DECam	·	530 m	MPC · JPL
688874	2013 AZ_{160}	—	January 20, 2013	Mount Lemmon	Mount Lemmon Survey	·	1.3 km	MPC · JPL
688875	2013 AK_{164}	—	January 4, 2013	Cerro Tololo-DECam	DECam	·	510 m	MPC · JPL
688876	2013 AM_{164}	—	January 4, 2013	Cerro Tololo-DECam	DECam	·	1.9 km	MPC · JPL
688877	2013 AL_{168}	—	January 4, 2013	Cerro Tololo-DECam	DECam	·	540 m	MPC · JPL
688878	2013 AU_{168}	—	February 2, 2008	Kitt Peak	Spacewatch	·	1.9 km	MPC · JPL
688879	2013 AA_{171}	—	January 4, 2013	Cerro Tololo-DECam	DECam	EOS	1.1 km	MPC · JPL
688880	2013 AE_{171}	—	January 4, 2013	Cerro Tololo-DECam	DECam	·	500 m	MPC · JPL
688881	2013 AL_{171}	—	January 4, 2013	Cerro Tololo-DECam	DECam	·	2.2 km	MPC · JPL
688882	2013 AO_{173}	—	October 3, 2006	Mount Lemmon	Mount Lemmon Survey	EOS	1.1 km	MPC · JPL
688883	2013 AB_{175}	—	May 22, 2006	Kitt Peak	Spacewatch	MAR	970 m	MPC · JPL
688884	2013 AZ_{175}	—	November 26, 2003	Kitt Peak	Spacewatch	EUN	940 m	MPC · JPL
688885	2013 AY_{179}	—	January 5, 2013	Cerro Tololo-DECam	DECam	·	2.2 km	MPC · JPL
688886	2013 AF_{180}	—	January 5, 2013	Cerro Tololo-DECam	DECam	·	2.3 km	MPC · JPL
688887	2013 AA_{183}	—	October 9, 2007	Kitt Peak	Spacewatch	·	1.4 km	MPC · JPL
688888	2013 AS_{183}	—	January 10, 2013	Haleakala	Pan-STARRS 1	SDO	171 km	MPC · JPL
688889	2013 AA_{186}	—	December 30, 2007	Kitt Peak	Spacewatch	·	1.6 km	MPC · JPL
688890	2013 AO_{187}	—	January 10, 2013	Haleakala	Pan-STARRS 1	MRX	810 m	MPC · JPL
688891	2013 AN_{188}	—	January 10, 2013	Haleakala	Pan-STARRS 1	·	490 m	MPC · JPL
688892	2013 AU_{189}	—	October 9, 2016	Mount Lemmon	Mount Lemmon Survey	·	1.5 km	MPC · JPL
688893	2013 AJ_{190}	—	September 12, 2015	Haleakala	Pan-STARRS 1	·	530 m	MPC · JPL
688894	2013 AM_{190}	—	October 11, 2015	Bergisch Gladbach	W. Bickel	·	510 m	MPC · JPL
688895	2013 AM_{195}	—	January 10, 2013	Haleakala	Pan-STARRS 1	·	690 m	MPC · JPL
688896	2013 AC_{197}	—	January 6, 2013	Kitt Peak	Spacewatch	·	520 m	MPC · JPL
688897	2013 AG_{197}	—	January 10, 2013	Haleakala	Pan-STARRS 1	·	1.2 km	MPC · JPL
688898	2013 AC_{198}	—	January 10, 2013	Haleakala	Pan-STARRS 1	·	2.9 km	MPC · JPL
688899	2013 AS_{201}	—	January 9, 2013	Mount Lemmon	Mount Lemmon Survey	EUN	1.1 km	MPC · JPL
688900	2013 AW_{203}	—	January 10, 2013	Haleakala	Pan-STARRS 1	·	2.8 km	MPC · JPL

== 688901–689000 ==
back to top

Designation			Discovery			Properties		Ref
Permanent	Provisional	Named after	Date	Site	Discoverer(s)	Category	Diam.	Ref
688901	2013 AB_{205}	—	February 26, 2008	Mount Lemmon	Mount Lemmon Survey	EOS	1.3 km	MPC · JPL
688902	2013 AU_{205}	—	January 10, 2013	Haleakala	Pan-STARRS 1	·	1.5 km	MPC · JPL
688903	2013 AO_{206}	—	January 5, 2013	Mount Lemmon	Mount Lemmon Survey	EOS	1.3 km	MPC · JPL
688904	2013 AP_{207}	—	January 10, 2013	Haleakala	Pan-STARRS 1	·	1.1 km	MPC · JPL
688905	2013 AR_{209}	—	January 10, 2013	Haleakala	Pan-STARRS 1	·	1.6 km	MPC · JPL
688906	2013 AJ_{210}	—	January 10, 2013	Haleakala	Pan-STARRS 1	·	1.6 km	MPC · JPL
688907	2013 AU_{211}	—	January 5, 2013	Mount Lemmon	Mount Lemmon Survey	·	1.2 km	MPC · JPL
688908	2013 BD_{1}	—	October 17, 2009	Mount Lemmon	Mount Lemmon Survey	L4	7.2 km	MPC · JPL
688909	2013 BU_{4}	—	October 20, 2007	Mount Lemmon	Mount Lemmon Survey	·	1.4 km	MPC · JPL
688910	2013 BL_{5}	—	January 16, 2013	Mount Lemmon	Mount Lemmon Survey	·	1.3 km	MPC · JPL
688911	2013 BK_{6}	—	October 27, 2006	Kitt Peak	Spacewatch	·	1.9 km	MPC · JPL
688912	2013 BZ_{6}	—	November 19, 2007	Kitt Peak	Spacewatch	WIT	860 m	MPC · JPL
688913	2013 BD_{9}	—	January 16, 2013	Haleakala	Pan-STARRS 1	·	1.4 km	MPC · JPL
688914	2013 BA_{10}	—	January 18, 2004	Kitt Peak	Spacewatch	·	1.6 km	MPC · JPL
688915	2013 BN_{11}	—	December 20, 2007	Kitt Peak	Spacewatch	·	1.5 km	MPC · JPL
688916	2013 BX_{11}	—	January 16, 2013	Haleakala	Pan-STARRS 1	·	1.3 km	MPC · JPL
688917	2013 BH_{13}	—	January 4, 2013	Mount Lemmon	Mount Lemmon Survey	·	630 m	MPC · JPL
688918	2013 BP_{13}	—	December 30, 2008	Mount Lemmon	Mount Lemmon Survey	·	1.6 km	MPC · JPL
688919	2013 BD_{15}	—	January 17, 2013	Haleakala	Pan-STARRS 1	KOR	1.0 km	MPC · JPL
688920	2013 BE_{17}	—	September 25, 2009	Kitt Peak	Spacewatch	L4	7.4 km	MPC · JPL
688921	2013 BB_{18}	—	January 15, 2013	Nogales	M. Schwartz, P. R. Holvorcem	H	660 m	MPC · JPL
688922	2013 BE_{21}	—	December 23, 2012	Haleakala	Pan-STARRS 1	·	1.4 km	MPC · JPL
688923	2013 BH_{23}	—	January 17, 2013	Kitt Peak	Spacewatch	KOR	1.2 km	MPC · JPL
688924	2013 BV_{23}	—	September 20, 2003	Kitt Peak	Spacewatch	·	1.3 km	MPC · JPL
688925	2013 BF_{26}	—	January 9, 2013	Kitt Peak	Spacewatch	·	2.2 km	MPC · JPL
688926	2013 BU_{26}	—	January 18, 2013	Haleakala	Pan-STARRS 1	H	470 m	MPC · JPL
688927	2013 BR_{29}	—	January 16, 2013	Haleakala	Pan-STARRS 1	·	550 m	MPC · JPL
688928	2013 BC_{32}	—	January 16, 2013	Haleakala	Pan-STARRS 1	·	1.5 km	MPC · JPL
688929	2013 BX_{32}	—	March 9, 2005	Mount Lemmon	Mount Lemmon Survey	·	1.0 km	MPC · JPL
688930	2013 BN_{34}	—	January 5, 2013	Mount Lemmon	Mount Lemmon Survey	·	1.3 km	MPC · JPL
688931	2013 BG_{35}	—	January 17, 2013	Haleakala	Pan-STARRS 1	KOR	1.1 km	MPC · JPL
688932	2013 BB_{38}	—	January 5, 2013	Mount Lemmon	Mount Lemmon Survey	·	1.7 km	MPC · JPL
688933	2013 BZ_{38}	—	January 18, 2013	Kitt Peak	Spacewatch	AGN	1.1 km	MPC · JPL
688934	2013 BL_{39}	—	January 10, 2013	Haleakala	Pan-STARRS 1	·	1.2 km	MPC · JPL
688935	2013 BT_{42}	—	August 23, 2008	Kitt Peak	Spacewatch	·	690 m	MPC · JPL
688936	2013 BF_{44}	—	January 19, 2013	Mount Lemmon	Mount Lemmon Survey	·	2.1 km	MPC · JPL
688937	2013 BJ_{46}	—	October 24, 2007	Mount Lemmon	Mount Lemmon Survey	·	1.6 km	MPC · JPL
688938	2013 BN_{49}	—	November 2, 2007	Kitt Peak	Spacewatch	·	1.5 km	MPC · JPL
688939	2013 BF_{51}	—	September 3, 2008	Kitt Peak	Spacewatch	·	620 m	MPC · JPL
688940	2013 BG_{51}	—	March 19, 2007	Mount Lemmon	Mount Lemmon Survey	·	680 m	MPC · JPL
688941	2013 BK_{51}	—	September 21, 2011	Ka-Dar	Gerke, V.	·	1.5 km	MPC · JPL
688942	2013 BN_{51}	—	January 16, 2013	Haleakala	Pan-STARRS 1	AGN	1.1 km	MPC · JPL
688943	2013 BE_{52}	—	January 16, 2013	Haleakala	Pan-STARRS 1	·	1.2 km	MPC · JPL
688944	2013 BH_{52}	—	January 16, 2013	Haleakala	Pan-STARRS 1	·	1.4 km	MPC · JPL
688945	2013 BU_{52}	—	October 8, 2008	Kitt Peak	Spacewatch	·	500 m	MPC · JPL
688946	2013 BV_{53}	—	January 14, 2008	Kitt Peak	Spacewatch	·	1.6 km	MPC · JPL
688947	2013 BD_{54}	—	March 1, 2009	Mount Lemmon	Mount Lemmon Survey	·	2.0 km	MPC · JPL
688948	2013 BC_{55}	—	December 1, 2008	Kitt Peak	Spacewatch	MAS	520 m	MPC · JPL
688949	2013 BX_{55}	—	October 29, 2010	Mount Lemmon	Mount Lemmon Survey	L4	6.8 km	MPC · JPL
688950	2013 BO_{56}	—	January 5, 2013	Mount Lemmon	Mount Lemmon Survey	·	560 m	MPC · JPL
688951	2013 BG_{57}	—	February 5, 2006	Mount Lemmon	Mount Lemmon Survey	·	650 m	MPC · JPL
688952	2013 BH_{57}	—	January 27, 2006	Kitt Peak	Spacewatch	·	550 m	MPC · JPL
688953	2013 BU_{60}	—	January 9, 2013	Kitt Peak	Spacewatch	·	2.3 km	MPC · JPL
688954	2013 BA_{62}	—	December 3, 2005	Mauna Kea	A. Boattini	·	730 m	MPC · JPL
688955	2013 BX_{64}	—	January 19, 2013	Mount Lemmon	Mount Lemmon Survey	·	2.3 km	MPC · JPL
688956	2013 BH_{65}	—	December 31, 2005	Kitt Peak	Spacewatch	·	590 m	MPC · JPL
688957	2013 BT_{65}	—	January 19, 2013	Kitt Peak	Spacewatch	·	1.8 km	MPC · JPL
688958	2013 BT_{68}	—	January 20, 2013	Kitt Peak	Spacewatch	·	1.7 km	MPC · JPL
688959	2013 BJ_{72}	—	January 16, 2008	Kitt Peak	Spacewatch	EOS	1.4 km	MPC · JPL
688960	2013 BV_{81}	—	July 30, 2016	Haleakala	Pan-STARRS 1	·	2.0 km	MPC · JPL
688961	2013 BE_{84}	—	January 19, 2013	Kitt Peak	Spacewatch	·	1.3 km	MPC · JPL
688962	2013 BL_{84}	—	January 20, 2013	Mount Lemmon	Mount Lemmon Survey	·	1.2 km	MPC · JPL
688963	2013 BR_{84}	—	January 9, 2006	Kitt Peak	Spacewatch	·	570 m	MPC · JPL
688964	2013 BT_{84}	—	November 18, 2007	Kitt Peak	Spacewatch	·	2.2 km	MPC · JPL
688965	2013 BX_{85}	—	August 6, 2016	Haleakala	Pan-STARRS 1	·	1.9 km	MPC · JPL
688966	2013 BP_{86}	—	June 18, 2015	Haleakala	Pan-STARRS 1	·	1.4 km	MPC · JPL
688967	2013 BW_{86}	—	August 22, 2014	Haleakala	Pan-STARRS 1	H	360 m	MPC · JPL
688968	2013 BA_{87}	—	January 31, 2013	Mount Lemmon	Mount Lemmon Survey	·	770 m	MPC · JPL
688969	2013 BD_{89}	—	January 17, 2013	Haleakala	Pan-STARRS 1	·	2.5 km	MPC · JPL
688970	2013 BA_{90}	—	January 26, 2017	Haleakala	Pan-STARRS 1	·	1.0 km	MPC · JPL
688971	2013 BM_{90}	—	January 22, 2013	Mount Lemmon	Mount Lemmon Survey	EOS	1.4 km	MPC · JPL
688972	2013 BN_{91}	—	January 19, 2013	Mount Lemmon	Mount Lemmon Survey	·	1.3 km	MPC · JPL
688973	2013 BV_{91}	—	January 20, 2013	Kitt Peak	Spacewatch	·	630 m	MPC · JPL
688974	2013 BJ_{92}	—	January 18, 2013	Mount Lemmon	Mount Lemmon Survey	WIT	810 m	MPC · JPL
688975	2013 BL_{92}	—	January 19, 2013	Mount Lemmon	Mount Lemmon Survey	·	560 m	MPC · JPL
688976	2013 BC_{96}	—	January 17, 2013	Haleakala	Pan-STARRS 1	·	1.4 km	MPC · JPL
688977	2013 BZ_{99}	—	February 26, 2008	Mount Lemmon	Mount Lemmon Survey	·	1.1 km	MPC · JPL
688978	2013 BE_{100}	—	January 16, 2013	Haleakala	Pan-STARRS 1	·	1.3 km	MPC · JPL
688979	2013 BK_{100}	—	January 19, 2013	Kitt Peak	Spacewatch	·	680 m	MPC · JPL
688980	2013 BL_{100}	—	January 17, 2013	Kitt Peak	Spacewatch	·	1.9 km	MPC · JPL
688981	2013 BM_{100}	—	January 17, 2013	Haleakala	Pan-STARRS 1	EOS	1.1 km	MPC · JPL
688982	2013 BY_{100}	—	January 20, 2013	Mount Lemmon	Mount Lemmon Survey	EOS	1.5 km	MPC · JPL
688983	2013 BL_{101}	—	January 17, 2013	Kitt Peak	Spacewatch	·	1.8 km	MPC · JPL
688984	2013 BN_{101}	—	January 17, 2013	Haleakala	Pan-STARRS 1	·	1.2 km	MPC · JPL
688985	2013 BS_{101}	—	October 15, 2007	Catalina	CSS	·	1.6 km	MPC · JPL
688986	2013 BB_{102}	—	January 17, 2013	Haleakala	Pan-STARRS 1	·	1.4 km	MPC · JPL
688987	2013 BD_{102}	—	January 17, 2013	Haleakala	Pan-STARRS 1	EOS	1.1 km	MPC · JPL
688988	2013 BS_{102}	—	January 17, 2013	Haleakala	Pan-STARRS 1	·	1.4 km	MPC · JPL
688989	2013 BT_{102}	—	January 17, 2013	Kitt Peak	Spacewatch	·	1.8 km	MPC · JPL
688990	2013 BU_{106}	—	January 20, 2013	Kitt Peak	Spacewatch	L4	6.2 km	MPC · JPL
688991	2013 BR_{107}	—	January 20, 2013	Kitt Peak	Spacewatch	EOS	1.4 km	MPC · JPL
688992	2013 CV_{2}	—	January 10, 2013	Haleakala	Pan-STARRS 1	·	550 m	MPC · JPL
688993	2013 CB_{3}	—	September 19, 2003	Palomar	NEAT	·	1.4 km	MPC · JPL
688994	2013 CF_{4}	—	October 29, 2005	Catalina	CSS	·	3.3 km	MPC · JPL
688995	2013 CC_{5}	—	February 2, 2013	Mount Lemmon	Mount Lemmon Survey	·	620 m	MPC · JPL
688996	2013 CD_{7}	—	February 10, 2008	Kitt Peak	Spacewatch	EOS	1.4 km	MPC · JPL
688997	2013 CR_{8}	—	April 24, 2009	Mount Lemmon	Mount Lemmon Survey	MRX	1.1 km	MPC · JPL
688998	2013 CE_{11}	—	February 1, 2013	Kitt Peak	Spacewatch	·	1.4 km	MPC · JPL
688999	2013 CJ_{14}	—	February 1, 2013	Kitt Peak	Spacewatch	(12739)	1.5 km	MPC · JPL
689000	2013 CU_{19}	—	February 2, 2013	Mount Lemmon	Mount Lemmon Survey	·	1.5 km	MPC · JPL

== Meaning of names ==
As minor planet discoveries are confirmed, they are given a permanent number by the IAU's Minor Planet Center (MPC), and the discoverers can then submit names for them, following the IAU's naming conventions. The list below concerns those minor planets in the specified number-range that have received names, and explains the meanings of those names.

Official naming citations of newly named small Solar System bodies are approved and published in a bulletin by IAU's Working Group for Small Bodies Nomenclature (WGSBN). Before May 2021, citations were published in MPC's Minor Planet Circulars for many decades. Recent citations can also be found on the JPL Small-Body Database (SBDB). Until his death in 2016, German astronomer Lutz D. Schmadel compiled these citations into the Dictionary of Minor Planet Names (DMP) and regularly updated the collection.

Based on Paul Herget's The Names of the Minor Planets, Schmadel also researched the unclear origin of numerous asteroids, most of which had been named prior to World War II. This article incorporates text from this source, which is in the public domain: SBDB New namings may only be added to this list below after official publication as the preannouncement of names is condemned. The WGSBN publishes a comprehensive guideline for the naming rules of non-cometary small Solar System bodies.

Named minor planet	Provisional	This minor planet was named for...	Ref · Catalog
688117 Omizzolo	2012 HZ_{109}	Fr. Alessandro Omizzolo, Italian diocesan priest and astronomer, and member of the Vatican Observatory. His research includes quasars, galaxy clusters and jellyfish galaxies. He digitized the historic photographic plate collection of the Vatican Observatory.	IAU · 688117
688696 Bertiau	2012 VH_{143}	Florent Constant Bertiau, Belgian Jesuit who worked at the Vatican Observatory.	IAU · 688696
