= List of minor planets: 717001–718000 =

The following is a partial list of minor planets, running from minor-planet number 717001 through 718000, inclusive. The primary data for this and other partial lists is based on JPL's "Small-Body Orbital Elements" and data available from the Minor Planet Center. Critical list information is also provided by the MPC, unless otherwise specified from Lowell Observatory. A detailed description of the table's columns and additional sources are given on the main page including a complete list of every page in this series, and a statistical break-up on the dynamical classification of minor planets.

Also see the summary list of all named bodies in numerical and alphabetical order, and the corresponding naming citations for the number range of this particular list. New namings may only be added to this list after official publication, as the preannouncement of names is condemned by the Working Group for Small Bodies Nomenclature of the International Astronomical Union.

Near-Earth obj.	MBA (inner)	MBA (outer)	Centaur
Mars-crosser	MBA (middle)	Jupiter trojan	Trans-Neptunian obj.
Unclassified

== 717001–717100 ==
Designation			Discovery			Properties		Ref
Permanent	Provisional	Named after	Date	Site	Discoverer(s)	Category	Diam.	Ref
717001	2016 LG_{64}	—	August 20, 2000	Kitt Peak	Spacewatch	·	1.5 km	MPC · JPL
717002	2016 LO_{65}	—	March 11, 2008	Kitt Peak	Spacewatch	NYS	930 m	MPC · JPL
717003	2016 LA_{67}	—	March 14, 2012	Mount Lemmon	Mount Lemmon Survey	·	670 m	MPC · JPL
717004	2016 LY_{76}	—	June 8, 2016	Haleakala	Pan-STARRS 1	·	1.1 km	MPC · JPL
717005	2016 LF_{77}	—	June 12, 2016	Mount Lemmon	Mount Lemmon Survey	·	1.2 km	MPC · JPL
717006	2016 LE_{81}	—	June 3, 2016	Haleakala	Pan-STARRS 1	·	1.2 km	MPC · JPL
717007	2016 LG_{81}	—	June 5, 2016	Haleakala	Pan-STARRS 1	·	1.2 km	MPC · JPL
717008	2016 LL_{81}	—	June 7, 2016	Haleakala	Pan-STARRS 1	MAR	730 m	MPC · JPL
717009	2016 LN_{81}	—	March 12, 2014	Mount Lemmon	Mount Lemmon Survey	L4	7.9 km	MPC · JPL
717010	2016 LJ_{95}	—	June 4, 2016	Haleakala	Pan-STARRS 1	MAR	750 m	MPC · JPL
717011	2016 MM_{3}	—	June 29, 2016	Haleakala	Pan-STARRS 1	·	1.1 km	MPC · JPL
717012	2016 NJ_{3}	—	September 20, 2008	Mount Lemmon	Mount Lemmon Survey	·	1.1 km	MPC · JPL
717013	2016 NQ_{3}	—	January 16, 2015	Haleakala	Pan-STARRS 1	V	510 m	MPC · JPL
717014	2016 NY_{5}	—	August 18, 2009	Kitt Peak	Spacewatch	·	890 m	MPC · JPL
717015	2016 NH_{6}	—	February 4, 2011	Catalina	CSS	·	1.3 km	MPC · JPL
717016	2016 NP_{8}	—	July 5, 2016	Haleakala	Pan-STARRS 1	·	830 m	MPC · JPL
717017	2016 NF_{11}	—	January 21, 2015	Haleakala	Pan-STARRS 1	·	1.3 km	MPC · JPL
717018	2016 NV_{16}	—	August 27, 2011	Haleakala	Pan-STARRS 1	·	2.4 km	MPC · JPL
717019	2016 NF_{19}	—	May 14, 2012	Mount Lemmon	Mount Lemmon Survey	·	610 m	MPC · JPL
717020	2016 NW_{19}	—	September 29, 2008	Catalina	CSS	·	860 m	MPC · JPL
717021	2016 ND_{21}	—	May 5, 2014	Cerro Tololo	DECam	T_{j} (2.59) · unusual	20 km	MPC · JPL
717022	2016 NQ_{23}	—	September 15, 2012	Kislovodsk	ISON-Kislovodsk Observatory	·	1.6 km	MPC · JPL
717023	2016 NX_{23}	—	September 16, 2009	Mount Lemmon	Mount Lemmon Survey	3:2	4.1 km	MPC · JPL
717024	2016 NH_{25}	—	April 30, 2012	Mount Lemmon	Mount Lemmon Survey	MAR	1.2 km	MPC · JPL
717025	2016 NB_{27}	—	October 31, 2013	Kitt Peak	Spacewatch	PHO	740 m	MPC · JPL
717026	2016 NN_{27}	—	July 21, 2006	Catalina	CSS	H	500 m	MPC · JPL
717027	2016 NJ_{37}	—	January 10, 2014	Mount Lemmon	Mount Lemmon Survey	·	950 m	MPC · JPL
717028	2016 NB_{38}	—	July 6, 2016	Haleakala	Pan-STARRS 1	·	920 m	MPC · JPL
717029	2016 NJ_{41}	—	December 25, 2005	Kitt Peak	Spacewatch	·	850 m	MPC · JPL
717030	2016 NM_{41}	—	August 27, 2000	Cerro Tololo	Deep Ecliptic Survey	·	950 m	MPC · JPL
717031	2016 NV_{43}	—	January 3, 2011	Mount Lemmon	Mount Lemmon Survey	V	600 m	MPC · JPL
717032	2016 NQ_{46}	—	October 8, 2008	Mount Lemmon	Mount Lemmon Survey	(5)	740 m	MPC · JPL
717033	2016 NZ_{47}	—	March 31, 2009	Kitt Peak	Spacewatch	·	560 m	MPC · JPL
717034	2016 NU_{48}	—	April 23, 2011	Haleakala	Pan-STARRS 1	·	1.2 km	MPC · JPL
717035	2016 NJ_{51}	—	February 13, 2002	Kitt Peak	Spacewatch	·	1.1 km	MPC · JPL
717036	2016 NG_{55}	—	October 8, 2012	Haleakala	Pan-STARRS 1	·	1.1 km	MPC · JPL
717037	2016 NN_{55}	—	August 9, 2008	La Sagra	OAM	·	940 m	MPC · JPL
717038	2016 NX_{56}	—	June 28, 2005	Palomar	NEAT	H	580 m	MPC · JPL
717039	2016 NA_{60}	—	July 5, 2016	Haleakala	Pan-STARRS 1	·	970 m	MPC · JPL
717040	2016 NH_{67}	—	March 22, 2015	Haleakala	Pan-STARRS 1	·	1.1 km	MPC · JPL
717041	2016 ND_{68}	—	July 4, 2016	Haleakala	Pan-STARRS 1	KRM	1.7 km	MPC · JPL
717042	2016 NX_{68}	—	July 11, 2016	Haleakala	Pan-STARRS 1	·	860 m	MPC · JPL
717043	2016 NF_{69}	—	October 15, 2003	Anderson Mesa	LONEOS	·	1.4 km	MPC · JPL
717044	2016 ND_{72}	—	August 29, 2008	Parc National des Cévennes	C. Demeautis, J.-M. Lopez	·	1.3 km	MPC · JPL
717045	2016 NJ_{72}	—	February 23, 2015	Haleakala	Pan-STARRS 1	·	1.1 km	MPC · JPL
717046	2016 NX_{73}	—	July 5, 2016	Haleakala	Pan-STARRS 1	·	1.2 km	MPC · JPL
717047	2016 NM_{76}	—	July 4, 2016	Haleakala	Pan-STARRS 1	·	1.2 km	MPC · JPL
717048	2016 NO_{78}	—	December 24, 2013	Mount Lemmon	Mount Lemmon Survey	·	1.0 km	MPC · JPL
717049	2016 NX_{78}	—	April 2, 2011	Mount Lemmon	Mount Lemmon Survey	·	1.2 km	MPC · JPL
717050	2016 NH_{81}	—	July 7, 2016	Haleakala	Pan-STARRS 1	·	910 m	MPC · JPL
717051	2016 NX_{81}	—	October 7, 2008	Mount Lemmon	Mount Lemmon Survey	(5)	1.0 km	MPC · JPL
717052	2016 NF_{84}	—	October 29, 2006	Kuma Kogen	Fujita, Y.	·	900 m	MPC · JPL
717053	2016 NT_{85}	—	July 11, 2016	Haleakala	Pan-STARRS 1	·	840 m	MPC · JPL
717054	2016 NB_{86}	—	January 29, 2014	Catalina	CSS	·	1.4 km	MPC · JPL
717055	2016 NG_{86}	—	July 11, 2016	Haleakala	Pan-STARRS 1	·	1.4 km	MPC · JPL
717056	2016 NX_{88}	—	March 22, 2015	Haleakala	Pan-STARRS 1	·	1.0 km	MPC · JPL
717057	2016 NN_{90}	—	September 3, 2005	Mauna Kea	Veillet, C.	·	2.8 km	MPC · JPL
717058	2016 NB_{107}	—	July 5, 2016	Haleakala	Pan-STARRS 1	(16286)	1.6 km	MPC · JPL
717059	2016 NN_{108}	—	July 13, 2016	Mount Lemmon	Mount Lemmon Survey	NYS	900 m	MPC · JPL
717060	2016 NP_{110}	—	July 5, 2016	Haleakala	Pan-STARRS 1	·	1.5 km	MPC · JPL
717061	2016 NT_{113}	—	July 7, 2016	Haleakala	Pan-STARRS 1	(5)	1.1 km	MPC · JPL
717062	2016 NW_{113}	—	July 7, 2016	Mount Lemmon	Mount Lemmon Survey	·	1.6 km	MPC · JPL
717063	2016 NX_{113}	—	July 12, 2016	Mount Lemmon	Mount Lemmon Survey	·	1.1 km	MPC · JPL
717064	2016 NY_{113}	—	July 11, 2016	Haleakala	Pan-STARRS 1	BRG	1 km	MPC · JPL
717065	2016 NX_{117}	—	July 11, 2016	Mount Lemmon	Mount Lemmon Survey	·	1.2 km	MPC · JPL
717066	2016 ND_{118}	—	December 26, 2005	Kitt Peak	Spacewatch	·	1.2 km	MPC · JPL
717067	2016 NM_{118}	—	July 11, 2016	Haleakala	Pan-STARRS 1	·	730 m	MPC · JPL
717068	2016 NT_{118}	—	July 7, 2016	Mount Lemmon	Mount Lemmon Survey	MAR	790 m	MPC · JPL
717069	2016 NL_{119}	—	July 11, 2016	Haleakala	Pan-STARRS 1	·	2.4 km	MPC · JPL
717070	2016 NS_{122}	—	July 12, 2016	Mount Lemmon	Mount Lemmon Survey	·	1.0 km	MPC · JPL
717071	2016 NB_{124}	—	July 5, 2016	Haleakala	Pan-STARRS 1	·	790 m	MPC · JPL
717072	2016 NE_{145}	—	July 12, 2016	Mount Lemmon	Mount Lemmon Survey	·	1.5 km	MPC · JPL
717073	2016 NK_{147}	—	July 7, 2016	Mount Lemmon	Mount Lemmon Survey	3:2 · (6124)	3.9 km	MPC · JPL
717074	2016 NJ_{148}	—	July 15, 2016	Mount Lemmon	Mount Lemmon Survey	·	2.4 km	MPC · JPL
717075	2016 NH_{150}	—	July 13, 2016	Haleakala	Pan-STARRS 1	KOR	1 km	MPC · JPL
717076	2016 NY_{172}	—	July 5, 2016	Haleakala	Pan-STARRS 1	·	2.3 km	MPC · JPL
717077	2016 NZ_{179}	—	July 14, 2016	Haleakala	Pan-STARRS 1	·	1.4 km	MPC · JPL
717078	2016 OL_{2}	—	August 31, 2005	Kitt Peak	Spacewatch	·	2.4 km	MPC · JPL
717079	2016 OB_{3}	—	July 30, 2016	Haleakala	Pan-STARRS 1	MAR	910 m	MPC · JPL
717080	2016 OD_{3}	—	October 18, 2012	Mount Lemmon	Mount Lemmon Survey	·	1.5 km	MPC · JPL
717081	2016 OU_{3}	—	January 17, 2005	Kitt Peak	Spacewatch	ADE	1.6 km	MPC · JPL
717082	2016 OA_{4}	—	May 21, 2012	Haleakala	Pan-STARRS 1	V	640 m	MPC · JPL
717083	2016 OV_{7}	—	July 18, 2016	Haleakala	Pan-STARRS 1	·	1.1 km	MPC · JPL
717084	2016 OY_{7}	—	July 26, 2016	Kitt Peak	Spacewatch	·	920 m	MPC · JPL
717085	2016 OC_{8}	—	July 29, 2016	Haleakala	Pan-STARRS 1	EUN	1.1 km	MPC · JPL
717086	2016 OZ_{10}	—	July 30, 2016	Haleakala	Pan-STARRS 1	·	1.3 km	MPC · JPL
717087	2016 OO_{12}	—	July 17, 2016	Haleakala	Pan-STARRS 1	·	950 m	MPC · JPL
717088	2016 PD_{3}	—	March 22, 2015	Haleakala	Pan-STARRS 1	LIX	2.7 km	MPC · JPL
717089	2016 PU_{3}	—	February 11, 2004	Kitt Peak	Spacewatch	V	600 m	MPC · JPL
717090	2016 PG_{5}	—	September 13, 2013	Kitt Peak	Spacewatch	·	580 m	MPC · JPL
717091	2016 PO_{6}	—	June 21, 2012	Mount Lemmon	Mount Lemmon Survey	(194)	1.3 km	MPC · JPL
717092	2016 PR_{7}	—	June 30, 2008	Kitt Peak	Spacewatch	·	910 m	MPC · JPL
717093	2016 PP_{9}	—	August 8, 2005	Cerro Tololo	Deep Ecliptic Survey	·	950 m	MPC · JPL
717094	2016 PZ_{10}	—	November 18, 2003	Palomar	NEAT	·	1.6 km	MPC · JPL
717095	2016 PN_{11}	—	September 25, 2012	Kitt Peak	Spacewatch	·	1.2 km	MPC · JPL
717096	2016 PE_{19}	—	September 25, 2000	Kitt Peak	Spacewatch	·	750 m	MPC · JPL
717097	2016 PK_{23}	—	August 2, 2016	Haleakala	Pan-STARRS 1	·	1.2 km	MPC · JPL
717098	2016 PY_{25}	—	August 2, 2016	Haleakala	Pan-STARRS 1	·	870 m	MPC · JPL
717099	2016 PX_{29}	—	August 6, 2016	Haleakala	Pan-STARRS 1	·	1.4 km	MPC · JPL
717100	2016 PH_{32}	—	April 6, 2011	Mount Lemmon	Mount Lemmon Survey	·	1.2 km	MPC · JPL

== 717101–717200 ==
back to top

Designation			Discovery			Properties		Ref
Permanent	Provisional	Named after	Date	Site	Discoverer(s)	Category	Diam.	Ref
717101	2016 PC_{42}	—	January 2, 2014	Kitt Peak	Spacewatch	·	800 m	MPC · JPL
717102	2016 PM_{42}	—	October 3, 2006	Mount Lemmon	Mount Lemmon Survey	(2076)	650 m	MPC · JPL
717103	2016 PX_{42}	—	April 14, 2008	Mount Lemmon	Mount Lemmon Survey	V	510 m	MPC · JPL
717104	2016 PP_{48}	—	October 31, 2008	Catalina	CSS	EUN	960 m	MPC · JPL
717105	2016 PR_{49}	—	November 12, 2013	Mount Lemmon	Mount Lemmon Survey	·	870 m	MPC · JPL
717106	2016 PG_{53}	—	January 19, 2008	Mount Lemmon	Mount Lemmon Survey	·	2.6 km	MPC · JPL
717107	2016 PH_{61}	—	December 29, 2014	Haleakala	Pan-STARRS 1	·	1.1 km	MPC · JPL
717108	2016 PX_{65}	—	June 2, 2016	Haleakala	Pan-STARRS 1	·	1.0 km	MPC · JPL
717109	2016 PS_{67}	—	October 8, 1993	Kitt Peak	Spacewatch	·	1.3 km	MPC · JPL
717110	2016 PL_{70}	—	September 6, 2008	Mount Lemmon	Mount Lemmon Survey	·	1.1 km	MPC · JPL
717111	2016 PU_{72}	—	September 15, 2009	Kitt Peak	Spacewatch	V	560 m	MPC · JPL
717112	2016 PW_{73}	—	November 20, 2012	Catalina	CSS	·	1.3 km	MPC · JPL
717113	2016 PZ_{73}	—	February 24, 2006	Kitt Peak	Spacewatch	·	1.4 km	MPC · JPL
717114	2016 PV_{74}	—	February 9, 2005	Mount Lemmon	Mount Lemmon Survey	·	1.2 km	MPC · JPL
717115	2016 PK_{78}	—	January 11, 2014	Kitt Peak	Spacewatch	ADE	2.2 km	MPC · JPL
717116	2016 PP_{79}	—	January 20, 2015	Haleakala	Pan-STARRS 1	H	480 m	MPC · JPL
717117	2016 PD_{80}	—	December 31, 2008	Mount Lemmon	Mount Lemmon Survey	H	410 m	MPC · JPL
717118	2016 PO_{83}	—	August 2, 2016	Haleakala	Pan-STARRS 1	EUN	970 m	MPC · JPL
717119	2016 PC_{85}	—	August 3, 2016	Haleakala	Pan-STARRS 1	·	1.4 km	MPC · JPL
717120	2016 PL_{85}	—	August 3, 2016	Haleakala	Pan-STARRS 1	EUN	820 m	MPC · JPL
717121	2016 PC_{90}	—	October 17, 2009	Mount Lemmon	Mount Lemmon Survey	·	920 m	MPC · JPL
717122	2016 PJ_{90}	—	August 6, 2016	Haleakala	Pan-STARRS 1	·	910 m	MPC · JPL
717123	2016 PK_{93}	—	October 9, 2007	Mount Lemmon	Mount Lemmon Survey	·	1.2 km	MPC · JPL
717124	2016 PT_{93}	—	September 12, 2007	Mount Lemmon	Mount Lemmon Survey	AGN	1.0 km	MPC · JPL
717125	2016 PE_{94}	—	November 4, 2012	Mount Lemmon	Mount Lemmon Survey	·	1.2 km	MPC · JPL
717126	2016 PJ_{94}	—	June 17, 2006	Kitt Peak	Spacewatch	(18466)	1.8 km	MPC · JPL
717127	2016 PL_{94}	—	August 10, 2016	Haleakala	Pan-STARRS 1	·	1.3 km	MPC · JPL
717128	2016 PA_{96}	—	August 6, 2016	Haleakala	Pan-STARRS 1	EUN	1.2 km	MPC · JPL
717129	2016 PT_{96}	—	August 1, 2016	Haleakala	Pan-STARRS 1	·	1.2 km	MPC · JPL
717130	2016 PC_{97}	—	October 15, 2012	Haleakala	Pan-STARRS 1	·	1.1 km	MPC · JPL
717131	2016 PF_{97}	—	August 2, 2016	Haleakala	Pan-STARRS 1	·	1.1 km	MPC · JPL
717132	2016 PZ_{97}	—	October 29, 2008	Mount Lemmon	Mount Lemmon Survey	·	1.2 km	MPC · JPL
717133	2016 PB_{98}	—	August 8, 2016	Haleakala	Pan-STARRS 1	·	970 m	MPC · JPL
717134	2016 PG_{100}	—	April 6, 2011	Mount Lemmon	Mount Lemmon Survey	·	1.0 km	MPC · JPL
717135	2016 PO_{101}	—	October 7, 2012	Kitt Peak	Spacewatch	·	1.1 km	MPC · JPL
717136	2016 PR_{101}	—	September 18, 2003	Kitt Peak	Spacewatch	·	1.1 km	MPC · JPL
717137	2016 PW_{101}	—	October 23, 2012	Mount Lemmon	Mount Lemmon Survey	·	1.2 km	MPC · JPL
717138	2016 PV_{102}	—	August 10, 2016	Haleakala	Pan-STARRS 1	·	1.3 km	MPC · JPL
717139	2016 PG_{103}	—	October 16, 2003	Kitt Peak	Spacewatch	·	1.1 km	MPC · JPL
717140	2016 PS_{105}	—	October 27, 2008	Kitt Peak	Spacewatch	EUN	840 m	MPC · JPL
717141	2016 PV_{107}	—	October 26, 2008	Kitt Peak	Spacewatch	·	1.1 km	MPC · JPL
717142	2016 PX_{109}	—	February 4, 2006	Mount Lemmon	Mount Lemmon Survey	·	990 m	MPC · JPL
717143	2016 PZ_{109}	—	November 13, 2012	Mount Lemmon	Mount Lemmon Survey	·	1.5 km	MPC · JPL
717144	2016 PM_{110}	—	March 14, 2007	Mount Lemmon	Mount Lemmon Survey	·	950 m	MPC · JPL
717145	2016 PU_{110}	—	August 2, 2016	Haleakala	Pan-STARRS 1	·	1.1 km	MPC · JPL
717146	2016 PM_{111}	—	March 1, 2009	Kitt Peak	Spacewatch	EOS	1.3 km	MPC · JPL
717147	2016 PK_{112}	—	July 31, 2011	Haleakala	Pan-STARRS 1	·	1.5 km	MPC · JPL
717148	2016 PA_{113}	—	November 17, 2012	Front Royal	Skillman, D. R.	·	1.4 km	MPC · JPL
717149	2016 PO_{114}	—	August 2, 2016	Haleakala	Pan-STARRS 1	·	790 m	MPC · JPL
717150	2016 PF_{115}	—	September 7, 2008	Mount Lemmon	Mount Lemmon Survey	·	650 m	MPC · JPL
717151	2016 PM_{116}	—	August 3, 2016	Haleakala	Pan-STARRS 1	·	1.2 km	MPC · JPL
717152	2016 PR_{116}	—	August 3, 2016	Haleakala	Pan-STARRS 1	V	570 m	MPC · JPL
717153	2016 PS_{116}	—	January 28, 2014	Kitt Peak	Spacewatch	KON	1.9 km	MPC · JPL
717154	2016 PZ_{116}	—	August 3, 2016	Haleakala	Pan-STARRS 1	·	1.0 km	MPC · JPL
717155	2016 PB_{117}	—	August 3, 2016	Haleakala	Pan-STARRS 1	·	1.2 km	MPC · JPL
717156	2016 PE_{117}	—	October 19, 2012	Mount Lemmon	Mount Lemmon Survey	·	1.4 km	MPC · JPL
717157	2016 PO_{122}	—	March 23, 2015	Mount Lemmon	Mount Lemmon Survey	V	560 m	MPC · JPL
717158	2016 PU_{122}	—	August 10, 2016	Haleakala	Pan-STARRS 1	MAR	790 m	MPC · JPL
717159	2016 PJ_{123}	—	August 10, 2016	Haleakala	Pan-STARRS 1	·	1.3 km	MPC · JPL
717160	2016 PL_{126}	—	August 14, 2016	Haleakala	Pan-STARRS 1	·	780 m	MPC · JPL
717161	2016 PQ_{126}	—	August 13, 2012	Haleakala	Pan-STARRS 1	·	1.2 km	MPC · JPL
717162	2016 PX_{127}	—	February 15, 2010	Catalina	CSS	MAR	1.2 km	MPC · JPL
717163	2016 PY_{146}	—	August 8, 2016	Haleakala	Pan-STARRS 1	·	1.4 km	MPC · JPL
717164	2016 PN_{152}	—	August 14, 2016	Haleakala	Pan-STARRS 1	·	1.1 km	MPC · JPL
717165	2016 PB_{153}	—	August 1, 2016	Haleakala	Pan-STARRS 1	EUN	1.1 km	MPC · JPL
717166	2016 PK_{153}	—	August 8, 2016	Haleakala	Pan-STARRS 1	·	2.8 km	MPC · JPL
717167	2016 PV_{153}	—	August 9, 2016	Haleakala	Pan-STARRS 1	·	2.4 km	MPC · JPL
717168	2016 PO_{154}	—	August 3, 2016	Haleakala	Pan-STARRS 1	·	1.3 km	MPC · JPL
717169	2016 PJ_{156}	—	August 3, 2016	Haleakala	Pan-STARRS 1	MAR	720 m	MPC · JPL
717170	2016 PU_{156}	—	August 2, 2016	Haleakala	Pan-STARRS 1	·	1.4 km	MPC · JPL
717171	2016 PK_{163}	—	August 2, 2016	Haleakala	Pan-STARRS 1	MAR	660 m	MPC · JPL
717172	2016 PS_{163}	—	August 3, 2016	Haleakala	Pan-STARRS 1	·	890 m	MPC · JPL
717173	2016 PC_{165}	—	August 13, 2016	Haleakala	Pan-STARRS 1	·	1.0 km	MPC · JPL
717174	2016 PL_{166}	—	August 10, 2016	Haleakala	Pan-STARRS 1	·	1.0 km	MPC · JPL
717175	2016 PB_{167}	—	August 3, 2016	Haleakala	Pan-STARRS 1	·	780 m	MPC · JPL
717176	2016 PG_{167}	—	August 3, 2016	Haleakala	Pan-STARRS 1	·	900 m	MPC · JPL
717177	2016 PZ_{177}	—	August 8, 2016	Haleakala	Pan-STARRS 1	·	1.0 km	MPC · JPL
717178	2016 PH_{178}	—	August 2, 2016	Haleakala	Pan-STARRS 1	·	920 m	MPC · JPL
717179	2016 PV_{191}	—	August 14, 2016	Haleakala	Pan-STARRS 1	·	1.6 km	MPC · JPL
717180	2016 PZ_{196}	—	August 1, 2016	Haleakala	Pan-STARRS 1	·	1.4 km	MPC · JPL
717181	2016 PG_{207}	—	August 2, 2016	Haleakala	Pan-STARRS 1	·	1.3 km	MPC · JPL
717182	2016 PH_{209}	—	August 2, 2016	Haleakala	Pan-STARRS 1	EUN	900 m	MPC · JPL
717183	2016 PZ_{209}	—	August 9, 2016	Haleakala	Pan-STARRS 1	·	2.2 km	MPC · JPL
717184	2016 PV_{211}	—	August 14, 2016	Haleakala	Pan-STARRS 1	·	2.1 km	MPC · JPL
717185	2016 PP_{219}	—	August 3, 2016	Haleakala	Pan-STARRS 1	KOR	1.2 km	MPC · JPL
717186	2016 PE_{226}	—	August 11, 2016	Haleakala	Pan-STARRS 1	·	1.2 km	MPC · JPL
717187	2016 PY_{227}	—	August 2, 2016	Haleakala	Pan-STARRS 1	HOF	1.8 km	MPC · JPL
717188	2016 PO_{230}	—	August 3, 2016	Haleakala	Pan-STARRS 1	·	1.1 km	MPC · JPL
717189	2016 PP_{231}	—	August 3, 2016	Haleakala	Pan-STARRS 1	·	960 m	MPC · JPL
717190	2016 PX_{231}	—	August 3, 2016	Haleakala	Pan-STARRS 1	·	1.1 km	MPC · JPL
717191	2016 PW_{235}	—	October 23, 2012	Kitt Peak	Spacewatch	·	1.1 km	MPC · JPL
717192	2016 PG_{236}	—	September 21, 2008	Mount Lemmon	Mount Lemmon Survey	EUN	1.1 km	MPC · JPL
717193	2016 PH_{239}	—	August 8, 2016	Haleakala	Pan-STARRS 1	EOS	1.3 km	MPC · JPL
717194	2016 PG_{245}	—	January 25, 2014	Haleakala	Pan-STARRS 1	·	1.0 km	MPC · JPL
717195	2016 PS_{247}	—	August 28, 2006	Kitt Peak	Spacewatch	KOR	1.1 km	MPC · JPL
717196	2016 PE_{283}	—	August 6, 2016	Haleakala	Pan-STARRS 1	·	1.1 km	MPC · JPL
717197	2016 PZ_{295}	—	August 8, 2016	Haleakala	Pan-STARRS 1	·	990 m	MPC · JPL
717198	2016 QX_{1}	—	April 18, 2015	Mount Lemmon	Mount Lemmon Survey	·	470 m	MPC · JPL
717199	2016 QT_{3}	—	July 30, 2008	Mount Lemmon	Mount Lemmon Survey	·	720 m	MPC · JPL
717200	2016 QJ_{6}	—	January 25, 2014	Haleakala	Pan-STARRS 1	MAR	880 m	MPC · JPL

== 717201–717300 ==
back to top

Designation			Discovery			Properties		Ref
Permanent	Provisional	Named after	Date	Site	Discoverer(s)	Category	Diam.	Ref
717201	2016 QL_{6}	—	October 24, 2008	Catalina	CSS	·	960 m	MPC · JPL
717202	2016 QF_{7}	—	December 27, 2005	Mount Lemmon	Mount Lemmon Survey	MAR	920 m	MPC · JPL
717203	2016 QQ_{7}	—	December 31, 2008	Kitt Peak	Spacewatch	·	1.7 km	MPC · JPL
717204	2016 QM_{9}	—	October 21, 2012	Catalina	CSS	EUN	1.2 km	MPC · JPL
717205	2016 QB_{10}	—	December 26, 2006	Kitt Peak	Spacewatch	·	950 m	MPC · JPL
717206	2016 QO_{12}	—	September 15, 2012	Kitt Peak	Spacewatch	MAR	880 m	MPC · JPL
717207	2016 QS_{12}	—	March 12, 2008	Kitt Peak	Spacewatch	·	900 m	MPC · JPL
717208	2016 QW_{12}	—	September 3, 2008	Kitt Peak	Spacewatch	·	930 m	MPC · JPL
717209	2016 QG_{14}	—	September 4, 2007	Mount Lemmon	Mount Lemmon Survey	·	1.8 km	MPC · JPL
717210	2016 QJ_{15}	—	January 23, 2015	Haleakala	Pan-STARRS 1	·	1.2 km	MPC · JPL
717211	2016 QP_{16}	—	January 1, 2014	Kitt Peak	Spacewatch	·	1.8 km	MPC · JPL
717212	2016 QA_{17}	—	October 17, 2012	Mount Lemmon	Mount Lemmon Survey	·	1.7 km	MPC · JPL
717213	2016 QD_{24}	—	July 14, 2016	Haleakala	Pan-STARRS 1	·	1.0 km	MPC · JPL
717214	2016 QF_{24}	—	September 19, 2011	Haleakala	Pan-STARRS 1	TEL	1.0 km	MPC · JPL
717215	2016 QO_{26}	—	October 26, 2008	Mount Lemmon	Mount Lemmon Survey	·	930 m	MPC · JPL
717216	2016 QQ_{32}	—	March 18, 2015	Haleakala	Pan-STARRS 1	·	1.1 km	MPC · JPL
717217	2016 QW_{32}	—	July 11, 2016	Haleakala	Pan-STARRS 1	MAR	880 m	MPC · JPL
717218	2016 QZ_{33}	—	April 2, 2011	Mount Lemmon	Mount Lemmon Survey	RAF	880 m	MPC · JPL
717219	2016 QA_{34}	—	August 25, 2005	Palomar	NEAT	·	1.2 km	MPC · JPL
717220	2016 QW_{34}	—	August 3, 2016	Haleakala	Pan-STARRS 1	·	2.7 km	MPC · JPL
717221	2016 QT_{39}	—	October 11, 2009	Mount Lemmon	Mount Lemmon Survey	·	1.1 km	MPC · JPL
717222	2016 QX_{41}	—	December 13, 2006	Mount Lemmon	Mount Lemmon Survey	·	810 m	MPC · JPL
717223	2016 QT_{45}	—	September 8, 2004	Socorro	LINEAR	·	850 m	MPC · JPL
717224	2016 QB_{48}	—	October 17, 2012	Haleakala	Pan-STARRS 1	·	1.4 km	MPC · JPL
717225	2016 QT_{48}	—	October 21, 2012	Haleakala	Pan-STARRS 1	·	1.3 km	MPC · JPL
717226	2016 QH_{49}	—	January 2, 2014	Kitt Peak	Spacewatch	·	810 m	MPC · JPL
717227	2016 QO_{49}	—	February 25, 2011	Kitt Peak	Spacewatch	V	580 m	MPC · JPL
717228	2016 QH_{50}	—	September 17, 2012	Mount Lemmon	Mount Lemmon Survey	(5)	1.1 km	MPC · JPL
717229	2016 QZ_{50}	—	December 22, 2012	Haleakala	Pan-STARRS 1	·	1.6 km	MPC · JPL
717230	2016 QB_{56}	—	October 10, 2008	Mount Lemmon	Mount Lemmon Survey	·	1.3 km	MPC · JPL
717231	2016 QJ_{57}	—	July 11, 2016	Haleakala	Pan-STARRS 1	·	1.1 km	MPC · JPL
717232	2016 QP_{58}	—	December 20, 2009	Mount Lemmon	Mount Lemmon Survey	HNS	850 m	MPC · JPL
717233	2016 QW_{58}	—	June 12, 2008	Kitt Peak	Spacewatch	·	1.3 km	MPC · JPL
717234	2016 QU_{60}	—	July 11, 2016	Haleakala	Pan-STARRS 1	·	1.3 km	MPC · JPL
717235	2016 QN_{65}	—	September 5, 2008	Kitt Peak	Spacewatch	·	790 m	MPC · JPL
717236	2016 QX_{67}	—	June 7, 2016	Haleakala	Pan-STARRS 1	·	890 m	MPC · JPL
717237	2016 QB_{68}	—	July 14, 2016	Mount Lemmon	Mount Lemmon Survey	·	840 m	MPC · JPL
717238	2016 QF_{68}	—	October 19, 2011	Kitt Peak	Spacewatch	·	2.3 km	MPC · JPL
717239	2016 QK_{69}	—	October 15, 2004	Mount Lemmon	Mount Lemmon Survey	·	1.0 km	MPC · JPL
717240	2016 QU_{74}	—	September 17, 2012	Nogales	M. Schwartz, P. R. Holvorcem	EUN	1.1 km	MPC · JPL
717241	2016 QF_{75}	—	October 4, 2008	Mount Lemmon	Mount Lemmon Survey	(5)	840 m	MPC · JPL
717242	2016 QL_{75}	—	October 11, 2010	Mount Lemmon	Mount Lemmon Survey	·	3.3 km	MPC · JPL
717243	2016 QU_{76}	—	July 7, 2016	Mount Lemmon	Mount Lemmon Survey	EUN	830 m	MPC · JPL
717244	2016 QH_{77}	—	September 10, 2012	Črni Vrh	Matičič, S.	·	1.2 km	MPC · JPL
717245	2016 QT_{78}	—	September 15, 2012	Kislovodsk	ISON-Kislovodsk Observatory	EUN	1.2 km	MPC · JPL
717246	2016 QC_{79}	—	December 30, 2013	Kitt Peak	Spacewatch	·	1.2 km	MPC · JPL
717247	2016 QB_{81}	—	August 26, 2016	Haleakala	Pan-STARRS 1	ADE	1.4 km	MPC · JPL
717248	2016 QM_{81}	—	May 24, 2015	Mount Lemmon	Mount Lemmon Survey	EOS	1.2 km	MPC · JPL
717249	2016 QO_{81}	—	December 20, 2009	Mount Lemmon	Mount Lemmon Survey	·	1.0 km	MPC · JPL
717250	2016 QF_{83}	—	August 14, 2012	Haleakala	Pan-STARRS 1	·	820 m	MPC · JPL
717251	2016 QD_{87}	—	August 30, 2016	Mount Lemmon	Mount Lemmon Survey	·	2.1 km	MPC · JPL
717252	2016 QM_{88}	—	April 18, 2015	Mount Lemmon	Mount Lemmon Survey	·	1.2 km	MPC · JPL
717253	2016 QT_{89}	—	December 24, 2013	Mount Lemmon	Mount Lemmon Survey	·	1.6 km	MPC · JPL
717254	2016 QY_{89}	—	September 22, 2009	Mount Lemmon	Mount Lemmon Survey	V	670 m	MPC · JPL
717255	2016 QY_{90}	—	September 14, 2007	Catalina	CSS	·	1.6 km	MPC · JPL
717256	2016 QN_{91}	—	November 12, 2012	Mount Lemmon	Mount Lemmon Survey	·	1.4 km	MPC · JPL
717257	2016 QF_{93}	—	September 19, 2012	Mount Lemmon	Mount Lemmon Survey	·	1.2 km	MPC · JPL
717258	2016 QP_{93}	—	October 23, 2012	Haleakala	Pan-STARRS 1	·	1.0 km	MPC · JPL
717259	2016 QS_{94}	—	August 30, 2016	Haleakala	Pan-STARRS 1	·	1.2 km	MPC · JPL
717260	2016 QD_{95}	—	July 14, 2016	Haleakala	Pan-STARRS 1	·	2.0 km	MPC · JPL
717261	2016 QV_{102}	—	August 30, 2016	Mount Lemmon	Mount Lemmon Survey	·	1.4 km	MPC · JPL
717262	2016 QO_{104}	—	August 30, 2016	Mount Lemmon	Mount Lemmon Survey	·	960 m	MPC · JPL
717263	2016 QP_{104}	—	August 30, 2016	Mount Lemmon	Mount Lemmon Survey	EUN	940 m	MPC · JPL
717264	2016 QQ_{104}	—	August 27, 2016	Haleakala	Pan-STARRS 1	·	1.5 km	MPC · JPL
717265	2016 QG_{105}	—	August 26, 2016	Mount Lemmon	Mount Lemmon Survey	·	1.3 km	MPC · JPL
717266	2016 QK_{108}	—	August 28, 2016	Mount Lemmon	Mount Lemmon Survey	·	1.2 km	MPC · JPL
717267	2016 QK_{109}	—	August 30, 2016	Haleakala	Pan-STARRS 1	·	890 m	MPC · JPL
717268	2016 QP_{109}	—	August 30, 2016	Mount Lemmon	Mount Lemmon Survey	·	1.1 km	MPC · JPL
717269	2016 QU_{109}	—	August 30, 2016	Mount Lemmon	Mount Lemmon Survey	MAR	770 m	MPC · JPL
717270	2016 QA_{110}	—	August 29, 2016	Mount Lemmon	Mount Lemmon Survey	KON	1.7 km	MPC · JPL
717271	2016 QU_{110}	—	September 24, 2008	Kitt Peak	Spacewatch	·	970 m	MPC · JPL
717272	2016 QJ_{111}	—	August 26, 2016	Haleakala	Pan-STARRS 1	·	1.7 km	MPC · JPL
717273	2016 QD_{113}	—	August 27, 2016	Haleakala	Pan-STARRS 1	·	1.8 km	MPC · JPL
717274	2016 QJ_{113}	—	August 28, 2016	Mount Lemmon	Mount Lemmon Survey	·	1.7 km	MPC · JPL
717275	2016 QK_{114}	—	August 30, 2016	Mount Lemmon	Mount Lemmon Survey	·	860 m	MPC · JPL
717276	2016 QM_{124}	—	August 26, 2016	Haleakala	Pan-STARRS 1	·	2.2 km	MPC · JPL
717277	2016 QB_{128}	—	November 19, 2007	Kitt Peak	Spacewatch	·	1.5 km	MPC · JPL
717278	2016 QF_{130}	—	August 28, 2016	Mount Lemmon	Mount Lemmon Survey	3:2 · SHU	5.1 km	MPC · JPL
717279	2016 QT_{131}	—	August 27, 2016	Haleakala	Pan-STARRS 1	(16286)	1.4 km	MPC · JPL
717280	2016 RW_{4}	—	October 23, 2012	Mount Lemmon	Mount Lemmon Survey	·	1.7 km	MPC · JPL
717281	2016 RU_{6}	—	October 26, 2008	Kitt Peak	Spacewatch	·	1.1 km	MPC · JPL
717282	2016 RB_{7}	—	August 30, 2011	Haleakala	Pan-STARRS 1	·	1.5 km	MPC · JPL
717283	2016 RH_{8}	—	September 24, 2008	Catalina	CSS	H	520 m	MPC · JPL
717284	2016 RE_{10}	—	July 28, 2012	Charleston	R. Holmes	·	730 m	MPC · JPL
717285	2016 RX_{10}	—	October 11, 2012	Haleakala	Pan-STARRS 1	·	1.3 km	MPC · JPL
717286	2016 RZ_{12}	—	August 28, 2016	Mount Lemmon	Mount Lemmon Survey	·	1.3 km	MPC · JPL
717287	2016 RC_{16}	—	September 5, 2016	Mount Lemmon	Mount Lemmon Survey	·	1.5 km	MPC · JPL
717288	2016 RW_{16}	—	July 9, 2016	Mount Lemmon	Mount Lemmon Survey	·	1.1 km	MPC · JPL
717289	2016 RK_{21}	—	August 21, 2004	Siding Spring	SSS	·	1.1 km	MPC · JPL
717290	2016 RS_{22}	—	January 30, 2009	Mount Lemmon	Mount Lemmon Survey	EOS	1.2 km	MPC · JPL
717291	2016 RF_{24}	—	January 29, 2015	Haleakala	Pan-STARRS 1	PHO	880 m	MPC · JPL
717292	2016 RD_{27}	—	October 23, 2001	Palomar	NEAT	·	1.5 km	MPC · JPL
717293	2016 RR_{30}	—	May 21, 2015	Haleakala	Pan-STARRS 1	·	1.2 km	MPC · JPL
717294	2016 RO_{33}	—	September 10, 2016	Mount Lemmon	Mount Lemmon Survey	JUN	950 m	MPC · JPL
717295	2016 RS_{37}	—	August 13, 2012	Pises	Lopez, J., Cavadore, C.	·	1.4 km	MPC · JPL
717296	2016 RX_{43}	—	September 11, 2016	Mount Lemmon	Mount Lemmon Survey	EUN	1.2 km	MPC · JPL
717297	2016 RG_{46}	—	September 5, 2016	Mount Lemmon	Mount Lemmon Survey	EUN	660 m	MPC · JPL
717298	2016 RK_{46}	—	August 16, 2012	Haleakala	Pan-STARRS 1	·	1.0 km	MPC · JPL
717299	2016 RN_{46}	—	December 7, 2012	Haleakala	Pan-STARRS 1	·	1.7 km	MPC · JPL
717300	2016 RR_{46}	—	September 12, 2016	Haleakala	Pan-STARRS 1	·	1.4 km	MPC · JPL

== 717301–717400 ==
back to top

Designation			Discovery			Properties		Ref
Permanent	Provisional	Named after	Date	Site	Discoverer(s)	Category	Diam.	Ref
717301	2016 RU_{46}	—	September 12, 2016	Haleakala	Pan-STARRS 1	EUN	1.1 km	MPC · JPL
717302	2016 RX_{46}	—	October 2, 2003	Kitt Peak	Spacewatch	·	1.4 km	MPC · JPL
717303	2016 RQ_{47}	—	April 25, 2015	Haleakala	Pan-STARRS 1	·	1.2 km	MPC · JPL
717304	2016 RP_{48}	—	September 8, 2016	Haleakala	Pan-STARRS 1	·	2.1 km	MPC · JPL
717305	2016 RX_{49}	—	September 5, 2016	Mount Lemmon	Mount Lemmon Survey	·	830 m	MPC · JPL
717306	2016 RR_{51}	—	September 10, 2016	Mount Lemmon	Mount Lemmon Survey	·	1.2 km	MPC · JPL
717307	2016 RT_{59}	—	September 10, 2016	Mount Lemmon	Mount Lemmon Survey	·	1.1 km	MPC · JPL
717308	2016 RY_{59}	—	October 23, 2011	Haleakala	Pan-STARRS 1	·	2.3 km	MPC · JPL
717309	2016 RG_{64}	—	September 6, 2016	Mount Lemmon	Mount Lemmon Survey	·	1.3 km	MPC · JPL
717310	2016 RC_{65}	—	September 11, 2016	Mount Lemmon	Mount Lemmon Survey	PHO	760 m	MPC · JPL
717311	2016 RN_{67}	—	September 6, 2016	Mount Lemmon	Mount Lemmon Survey	·	970 m	MPC · JPL
717312	2016 RC_{69}	—	September 8, 2016	Haleakala	Pan-STARRS 1	·	1.4 km	MPC · JPL
717313	2016 RA_{72}	—	September 2, 2016	Mount Lemmon	Mount Lemmon Survey	·	890 m	MPC · JPL
717314	2016 RT_{75}	—	September 12, 2016	Mount Lemmon	Mount Lemmon Survey	·	1.3 km	MPC · JPL
717315	2016 RY_{77}	—	September 11, 2016	Mount Lemmon	Mount Lemmon Survey	MAS	570 m	MPC · JPL
717316	2016 RY_{84}	—	September 10, 2016	Mount Lemmon	Mount Lemmon Survey	·	1.4 km	MPC · JPL
717317	2016 RV_{85}	—	September 11, 2016	Mount Lemmon	Mount Lemmon Survey	·	1.3 km	MPC · JPL
717318	2016 RR_{92}	—	September 2, 2016	Mount Lemmon	Mount Lemmon Survey	·	2.3 km	MPC · JPL
717319	2016 RC_{96}	—	September 2, 2016	Mount Lemmon	Mount Lemmon Survey	MAR	710 m	MPC · JPL
717320	2016 SZ	—	March 10, 2005	Anderson Mesa	LONEOS	H	490 m	MPC · JPL
717321	2016 SY_{3}	—	September 24, 2012	Nogales	M. Schwartz, P. R. Holvorcem	·	1.3 km	MPC · JPL
717322	2016 SA_{4}	—	April 20, 2015	Haleakala	Pan-STARRS 1	·	1.6 km	MPC · JPL
717323	2016 SF_{6}	—	July 9, 2016	Mount Lemmon	Mount Lemmon Survey	·	1.9 km	MPC · JPL
717324	2016 SX_{7}	—	August 30, 2016	Haleakala	Pan-STARRS 1	·	1.7 km	MPC · JPL
717325	2016 SE_{8}	—	April 19, 2007	Kitt Peak	Spacewatch	·	900 m	MPC · JPL
717326	2016 SO_{8}	—	September 19, 2012	Nogales	M. Schwartz, P. R. Holvorcem	·	1.4 km	MPC · JPL
717327	2016 SX_{8}	—	September 12, 2016	Haleakala	Pan-STARRS 1	·	1.3 km	MPC · JPL
717328	2016 SB_{11}	—	October 5, 2012	Mount Lemmon	Mount Lemmon Survey	·	950 m	MPC · JPL
717329	2016 SJ_{12}	—	September 14, 1998	Kitt Peak	Spacewatch	·	780 m	MPC · JPL
717330	2016 ST_{12}	—	August 2, 2016	Haleakala	Pan-STARRS 1	(5)	960 m	MPC · JPL
717331	2016 SW_{16}	—	July 11, 2016	Mount Lemmon	Mount Lemmon Survey	H	490 m	MPC · JPL
717332	2016 SS_{18}	—	November 6, 2012	Nogales	M. Schwartz, P. R. Holvorcem	·	1.4 km	MPC · JPL
717333	2016 SC_{19}	—	June 18, 2012	Mount Lemmon	Mount Lemmon Survey	NYS	1.1 km	MPC · JPL
717334	2016 SR_{20}	—	July 30, 2008	Mount Lemmon	Mount Lemmon Survey	·	1.1 km	MPC · JPL
717335	2016 SQ_{25}	—	October 1, 2005	Kitt Peak	Spacewatch	CLA	1.4 km	MPC · JPL
717336	2016 SY_{25}	—	September 4, 2008	Kitt Peak	Spacewatch	·	800 m	MPC · JPL
717337	2016 SL_{28}	—	September 18, 2003	Kitt Peak	Spacewatch	EUN	1.1 km	MPC · JPL
717338	2016 SO_{30}	—	December 13, 2012	Mount Lemmon	Mount Lemmon Survey	MAR	800 m	MPC · JPL
717339	2016 SJ_{32}	—	October 21, 2012	Haleakala	Pan-STARRS 1	·	1.4 km	MPC · JPL
717340	2016 SL_{32}	—	March 9, 2011	Kitt Peak	Spacewatch	·	1.0 km	MPC · JPL
717341	2016 SR_{32}	—	April 23, 2015	Haleakala	Pan-STARRS 1	(5)	1.0 km	MPC · JPL
717342	2016 SK_{36}	—	October 20, 2012	Kitt Peak	Spacewatch	EUN	1.1 km	MPC · JPL
717343	2016 SN_{37}	—	September 25, 2009	Catalina	CSS	·	1.1 km	MPC · JPL
717344	2016 SG_{39}	—	July 30, 2005	Palomar	NEAT	·	920 m	MPC · JPL
717345	2016 SF_{41}	—	October 18, 2012	Haleakala	Pan-STARRS 1	·	1.0 km	MPC · JPL
717346	2016 SP_{41}	—	October 16, 2012	Mount Lemmon	Mount Lemmon Survey	·	860 m	MPC · JPL
717347	2016 SC_{42}	—	October 10, 2012	Kitt Peak	Spacewatch	·	1.1 km	MPC · JPL
717348	2016 SG_{42}	—	October 7, 2012	Haleakala	Pan-STARRS 1	·	750 m	MPC · JPL
717349	2016 SK_{44}	—	May 25, 2006	Mauna Kea	P. A. Wiegert	·	1.4 km	MPC · JPL
717350	2016 ST_{44}	—	September 11, 2007	Lulin	LUSS	·	1.2 km	MPC · JPL
717351	2016 SD_{48}	—	September 26, 2016	Haleakala	Pan-STARRS 1	HOF	2.0 km	MPC · JPL
717352	2016 SR_{49}	—	September 12, 2002	Palomar	NEAT	·	1.7 km	MPC · JPL
717353	2016 SX_{49}	—	November 6, 2007	Kitt Peak	Spacewatch	·	1.5 km	MPC · JPL
717354	2016 SD_{50}	—	October 10, 2007	Kitt Peak	Spacewatch	·	1.3 km	MPC · JPL
717355	2016 SZ_{50}	—	October 2, 2008	Kitt Peak	Spacewatch	KON	2.0 km	MPC · JPL
717356	2016 SK_{53}	—	January 21, 2014	Mount Lemmon	Mount Lemmon Survey	·	1.0 km	MPC · JPL
717357	2016 SW_{53}	—	October 14, 2012	Kitt Peak	Spacewatch	ADE	1.3 km	MPC · JPL
717358	2016 SW_{64}	—	August 31, 2003	Haleakala	NEAT	·	1.1 km	MPC · JPL
717359	2016 SR_{66}	—	September 19, 2003	Kitt Peak	Spacewatch	·	1.2 km	MPC · JPL
717360	2016 SG_{74}	—	September 30, 2016	Haleakala	Pan-STARRS 1	·	1.1 km	MPC · JPL
717361	2016 SM_{75}	—	September 25, 2016	Mount Lemmon	Mount Lemmon Survey	EOS	1.5 km	MPC · JPL
717362	2016 SS_{75}	—	September 25, 2016	Mount Lemmon	Mount Lemmon Survey	·	1.3 km	MPC · JPL
717363	2016 SS_{78}	—	September 27, 2016	Haleakala	Pan-STARRS 1	HOF	2.1 km	MPC · JPL
717364	2016 SA_{80}	—	September 27, 2016	Haleakala	Pan-STARRS 1	·	1.6 km	MPC · JPL
717365	2016 SN_{80}	—	September 26, 2016	Haleakala	Pan-STARRS 1	·	810 m	MPC · JPL
717366	2016 SC_{81}	—	May 17, 2010	Kitt Peak	Spacewatch	·	1.4 km	MPC · JPL
717367	2016 SM_{84}	—	September 27, 2016	Haleakala	Pan-STARRS 1	·	1.6 km	MPC · JPL
717368	2016 SQ_{84}	—	September 25, 2016	Mount Lemmon	Mount Lemmon Survey	·	1.3 km	MPC · JPL
717369	2016 SN_{109}	—	September 25, 2016	Mount Lemmon	Mount Lemmon Survey	·	1.4 km	MPC · JPL
717370	2016 TS_{1}	—	July 8, 2016	Haleakala	Pan-STARRS 1	·	1.3 km	MPC · JPL
717371	2016 TP_{5}	—	August 2, 2016	Haleakala	Pan-STARRS 1	·	1.0 km	MPC · JPL
717372	2016 TJ_{7}	—	September 21, 2012	Mount Lemmon	Mount Lemmon Survey	·	1.6 km	MPC · JPL
717373	2016 TW_{7}	—	October 10, 2007	Kitt Peak	Spacewatch	·	1.6 km	MPC · JPL
717374	2016 TZ_{7}	—	November 5, 2012	Kitt Peak	Spacewatch	BRG	1.3 km	MPC · JPL
717375	2016 TE_{9}	—	September 23, 2000	Socorro	LINEAR	·	710 m	MPC · JPL
717376	2016 TQ_{10}	—	December 14, 2003	Palomar	NEAT	H	470 m	MPC · JPL
717377	2016 TY_{12}	—	February 1, 2005	Kitt Peak	Spacewatch	·	1.2 km	MPC · JPL
717378	2016 TY_{15}	—	August 12, 2016	Haleakala	Pan-STARRS 1	·	1.1 km	MPC · JPL
717379	2016 TE_{16}	—	September 12, 2001	Socorro	LINEAR	·	1.1 km	MPC · JPL
717380	2016 TE_{20}	—	September 2, 2016	Mount Lemmon	Mount Lemmon Survey	·	1.4 km	MPC · JPL
717381	2016 TA_{22}	—	September 5, 2008	Kitt Peak	Spacewatch	H	420 m	MPC · JPL
717382	2016 TY_{22}	—	September 22, 2016	Mount Lemmon	Mount Lemmon Survey	·	1.6 km	MPC · JPL
717383	2016 TB_{23}	—	May 25, 2015	Haleakala	Pan-STARRS 1	·	780 m	MPC · JPL
717384	2016 TF_{25}	—	May 13, 2015	Mount Lemmon	Mount Lemmon Survey	·	1.0 km	MPC · JPL
717385	2016 TC_{27}	—	November 7, 2012	Haleakala	Pan-STARRS 1	(5)	1.2 km	MPC · JPL
717386	2016 TN_{28}	—	January 7, 2010	Kitt Peak	Spacewatch	·	1.2 km	MPC · JPL
717387	2016 TH_{30}	—	June 10, 2011	Mount Lemmon	Mount Lemmon Survey	·	1.5 km	MPC · JPL
717388	2016 TF_{31}	—	June 27, 2011	Kitt Peak	Spacewatch	·	1.8 km	MPC · JPL
717389	2016 TT_{35}	—	December 18, 2012	Nogales	M. Schwartz, P. R. Holvorcem	·	1.5 km	MPC · JPL
717390	2016 TM_{42}	—	September 25, 2016	Mount Lemmon	Mount Lemmon Survey	·	1.2 km	MPC · JPL
717391	2016 TS_{42}	—	December 23, 2012	Haleakala	Pan-STARRS 1	·	1.3 km	MPC · JPL
717392	2016 TP_{44}	—	August 2, 2016	Haleakala	Pan-STARRS 1	·	900 m	MPC · JPL
717393	2016 TT_{46}	—	September 9, 2007	Mount Lemmon	Mount Lemmon Survey	·	1.3 km	MPC · JPL
717394	2016 TK_{47}	—	October 25, 2012	Les Engarouines	L. Bernasconi	·	1.2 km	MPC · JPL
717395	2016 TN_{48}	—	September 20, 2003	Campo Imperatore	CINEOS	·	1.2 km	MPC · JPL
717396	2016 TV_{51}	—	May 14, 2015	Haleakala	Pan-STARRS 1	·	1.9 km	MPC · JPL
717397	2016 TP_{52}	—	October 7, 2016	Haleakala	Pan-STARRS 1	·	1.6 km	MPC · JPL
717398	2016 TD_{58}	—	October 6, 2016	Mount Lemmon	Mount Lemmon Survey	EUN	1.1 km	MPC · JPL
717399	2016 TN_{58}	—	October 10, 2008	Mount Lemmon	Mount Lemmon Survey	·	890 m	MPC · JPL
717400	2016 TW_{60}	—	October 18, 2003	Kitt Peak	Spacewatch	·	1.4 km	MPC · JPL

== 717401–717500 ==
back to top

Designation			Discovery			Properties		Ref
Permanent	Provisional	Named after	Date	Site	Discoverer(s)	Category	Diam.	Ref
717401	2016 TZ_{60}	—	April 22, 2007	Kitt Peak	Spacewatch	·	1.3 km	MPC · JPL
717402	2016 TZ_{61}	—	October 28, 2008	Mount Lemmon	Mount Lemmon Survey	·	1.1 km	MPC · JPL
717403	2016 TB_{64}	—	October 8, 2012	Mount Lemmon	Mount Lemmon Survey	·	920 m	MPC · JPL
717404	2016 TX_{64}	—	September 18, 1998	Kitt Peak	Spacewatch	·	1.5 km	MPC · JPL
717405	2016 TW_{70}	—	October 25, 2008	Kitt Peak	Spacewatch	(5)	970 m	MPC · JPL
717406	2016 TB_{71}	—	November 3, 2011	Mount Lemmon	Mount Lemmon Survey	·	2.5 km	MPC · JPL
717407	2016 TM_{73}	—	October 24, 2008	Socorro	LINEAR	·	1.0 km	MPC · JPL
717408	2016 TQ_{75}	—	September 25, 2016	Mount Lemmon	Mount Lemmon Survey	·	1.4 km	MPC · JPL
717409	2016 TK_{76}	—	October 4, 2016	Mount Lemmon	Mount Lemmon Survey	EUN	820 m	MPC · JPL
717410	2016 TM_{79}	—	January 10, 2013	Haleakala	Pan-STARRS 1	·	1.7 km	MPC · JPL
717411	2016 TQ_{80}	—	September 18, 2012	Mount Lemmon	Mount Lemmon Survey	·	1.3 km	MPC · JPL
717412	2016 TA_{81}	—	February 2, 2009	Kitt Peak	Spacewatch	·	1.8 km	MPC · JPL
717413	2016 TL_{82}	—	October 4, 2016	XuYi	PMO NEO Survey Program	·	2.5 km	MPC · JPL
717414	2016 TF_{83}	—	August 10, 2016	Haleakala	Pan-STARRS 1	·	1.2 km	MPC · JPL
717415	2016 TO_{83}	—	October 19, 2012	Haleakala	Pan-STARRS 1	MAR	950 m	MPC · JPL
717416	2016 TE_{84}	—	November 19, 2008	Mount Lemmon	Mount Lemmon Survey	·	1.9 km	MPC · JPL
717417	2016 TK_{84}	—	December 22, 2008	Kitt Peak	Spacewatch	·	1.7 km	MPC · JPL
717418	2016 TL_{84}	—	October 26, 2012	Mount Lemmon	Mount Lemmon Survey	·	1.6 km	MPC · JPL
717419	2016 TO_{84}	—	December 10, 2012	Catalina	CSS	·	1.4 km	MPC · JPL
717420	2016 TM_{86}	—	October 10, 2016	Haleakala	Pan-STARRS 1	·	1.3 km	MPC · JPL
717421	2016 TT_{86}	—	September 14, 2007	Mount Lemmon	Mount Lemmon Survey	·	1.2 km	MPC · JPL
717422	2016 TY_{86}	—	November 7, 2012	Mount Lemmon	Mount Lemmon Survey	·	1.2 km	MPC · JPL
717423	2016 TT_{87}	—	December 30, 2013	Kitt Peak	Spacewatch	·	940 m	MPC · JPL
717424	2016 TP_{88}	—	August 16, 2016	Haleakala	Pan-STARRS 1	MAR	960 m	MPC · JPL
717425	2016 TX_{88}	—	October 19, 2003	Kitt Peak	Spacewatch	·	1.6 km	MPC · JPL
717426	2016 TK_{92}	—	May 26, 2015	Haleakala	Pan-STARRS 1	EUN	1.1 km	MPC · JPL
717427	2016 TX_{93}	—	October 18, 2003	Anderson Mesa	LONEOS	EUN	1.2 km	MPC · JPL
717428	2016 TD_{95}	—	June 8, 2016	Mount Lemmon	Mount Lemmon Survey	·	1.2 km	MPC · JPL
717429	2016 TG_{97}	—	December 18, 2009	Mount Lemmon	Mount Lemmon Survey	·	1.2 km	MPC · JPL
717430	2016 TZ_{97}	—	October 2, 2016	Mount Lemmon	Mount Lemmon Survey	EUN	920 m	MPC · JPL
717431	2016 TP_{98}	—	September 29, 2003	Kitt Peak	Spacewatch	·	1.1 km	MPC · JPL
717432	2016 TZ_{98}	—	October 7, 2016	Haleakala	Pan-STARRS 1	·	860 m	MPC · JPL
717433	2016 TC_{99}	—	October 5, 2003	Kitt Peak	Spacewatch	·	1.4 km	MPC · JPL
717434	2016 TG_{100}	—	September 12, 2007	Catalina	CSS	EUN	1.1 km	MPC · JPL
717435	2016 TN_{110}	—	January 31, 2009	Mount Lemmon	Mount Lemmon Survey	·	1.5 km	MPC · JPL
717436	2016 TA_{119}	—	October 6, 2016	Haleakala	Pan-STARRS 1	·	1.1 km	MPC · JPL
717437	2016 TU_{120}	—	October 10, 2016	Mount Lemmon	Mount Lemmon Survey	·	1.2 km	MPC · JPL
717438	2016 TH_{121}	—	October 12, 2016	Haleakala	Pan-STARRS 1	·	1.2 km	MPC · JPL
717439	2016 TJ_{121}	—	October 12, 2016	Haleakala	Pan-STARRS 1	·	1.9 km	MPC · JPL
717440	2016 TL_{121}	—	October 7, 2016	Haleakala	Pan-STARRS 1	·	730 m	MPC · JPL
717441	2016 TY_{122}	—	October 2, 2016	Mount Lemmon	Mount Lemmon Survey	·	1.5 km	MPC · JPL
717442	2016 TE_{123}	—	October 5, 2016	Mount Lemmon	Mount Lemmon Survey	EUN	940 m	MPC · JPL
717443	2016 TB_{131}	—	October 13, 2016	Haleakala	Pan-STARRS 1	·	1.7 km	MPC · JPL
717444	2016 TP_{131}	—	October 6, 2016	Haleakala	Pan-STARRS 1	·	1.2 km	MPC · JPL
717445	2016 TM_{132}	—	January 16, 2013	Haleakala	Pan-STARRS 1	·	1.5 km	MPC · JPL
717446	2016 TN_{132}	—	October 12, 2016	Haleakala	Pan-STARRS 1	·	1.2 km	MPC · JPL
717447	2016 TS_{132}	—	October 6, 2016	Haleakala	Pan-STARRS 1	RAF	660 m	MPC · JPL
717448	2016 TT_{132}	—	October 2, 2016	Mount Lemmon	Mount Lemmon Survey	·	1.1 km	MPC · JPL
717449	2016 TU_{132}	—	October 7, 2016	Mount Lemmon	Mount Lemmon Survey	HNS	850 m	MPC · JPL
717450	2016 TV_{132}	—	October 4, 2016	Mount Lemmon	Mount Lemmon Survey	RAF	590 m	MPC · JPL
717451	2016 TC_{133}	—	October 9, 2016	Mount Lemmon	Mount Lemmon Survey	WIT	820 m	MPC · JPL
717452	2016 TK_{133}	—	October 9, 2016	Haleakala	Pan-STARRS 1	·	1.8 km	MPC · JPL
717453	2016 TP_{133}	—	October 8, 2016	Haleakala	Pan-STARRS 1	·	2.5 km	MPC · JPL
717454	2016 TE_{135}	—	October 9, 2012	Haleakala	Pan-STARRS 1	·	1.0 km	MPC · JPL
717455	2016 TA_{136}	—	October 13, 2016	Mount Lemmon	Mount Lemmon Survey	EUN	960 m	MPC · JPL
717456	2016 TG_{137}	—	October 12, 2016	Haleakala	Pan-STARRS 1	·	1.3 km	MPC · JPL
717457	2016 TO_{137}	—	October 4, 2016	Kitt Peak	Spacewatch	·	1.4 km	MPC · JPL
717458	2016 TA_{138}	—	October 7, 2016	Haleakala	Pan-STARRS 1	·	1.1 km	MPC · JPL
717459	2016 TR_{138}	—	October 12, 2016	Haleakala	Pan-STARRS 1	·	1.2 km	MPC · JPL
717460	2016 TS_{138}	—	October 12, 2016	Haleakala	Pan-STARRS 1	WIT	850 m	MPC · JPL
717461	2016 TK_{142}	—	October 12, 2016	Haleakala	Pan-STARRS 1	·	1.5 km	MPC · JPL
717462	2016 TW_{142}	—	October 7, 2016	Mount Lemmon	Mount Lemmon Survey	·	1.3 km	MPC · JPL
717463	2016 TG_{145}	—	October 13, 2016	Haleakala	Pan-STARRS 1	·	1.3 km	MPC · JPL
717464	2016 TQ_{145}	—	October 10, 2016	Haleakala	Pan-STARRS 1	MAR	770 m	MPC · JPL
717465	2016 TE_{150}	—	October 9, 2016	Haleakala	Pan-STARRS 1	·	900 m	MPC · JPL
717466	2016 TX_{151}	—	October 7, 2016	Haleakala	Pan-STARRS 1	·	1.2 km	MPC · JPL
717467	2016 TF_{183}	—	June 26, 2015	Haleakala	Pan-STARRS 1	·	1.4 km	MPC · JPL
717468	2016 TP_{184}	—	October 6, 2016	Haleakala	Pan-STARRS 1	AGN	840 m	MPC · JPL
717469	2016 TM_{189}	—	October 2, 2016	Mount Lemmon	Mount Lemmon Survey	·	1.8 km	MPC · JPL
717470	2016 TB_{192}	—	September 19, 2007	Kitt Peak	Spacewatch	·	1.2 km	MPC · JPL
717471	2016 UV_{1}	—	April 21, 2015	Haleakala	Pan-STARRS 1	V	600 m	MPC · JPL
717472	2016 UY_{1}	—	January 11, 2010	Kitt Peak	Spacewatch	·	1.0 km	MPC · JPL
717473	2016 UZ_{6}	—	September 26, 2006	Kitt Peak	Spacewatch	·	710 m	MPC · JPL
717474	2016 UL_{7}	—	November 14, 2012	Kitt Peak	Spacewatch	·	1.5 km	MPC · JPL
717475	2016 UZ_{8}	—	August 30, 2011	Kitt Peak	Spacewatch	·	1.5 km	MPC · JPL
717476	2016 UA_{9}	—	September 6, 2016	Mount Lemmon	Mount Lemmon Survey	·	1.3 km	MPC · JPL
717477	2016 UQ_{9}	—	September 21, 2011	Mount Lemmon	Mount Lemmon Survey	HOF	1.8 km	MPC · JPL
717478	2016 UK_{10}	—	September 7, 2008	Mount Lemmon	Mount Lemmon Survey	·	1.3 km	MPC · JPL
717479	2016 UH_{12}	—	October 6, 2016	Haleakala	Pan-STARRS 1	·	1.4 km	MPC · JPL
717480	2016 UO_{13}	—	October 20, 2012	Haleakala	Pan-STARRS 1	·	1.0 km	MPC · JPL
717481	2016 UJ_{15}	—	October 19, 2012	Mount Lemmon	Mount Lemmon Survey	BRG	1.1 km	MPC · JPL
717482	2016 US_{15}	—	February 1, 2009	Mount Lemmon	Mount Lemmon Survey	·	1.5 km	MPC · JPL
717483	2016 UF_{17}	—	October 17, 2012	Mount Lemmon	Mount Lemmon Survey	·	960 m	MPC · JPL
717484	2016 UW_{17}	—	November 22, 2012	Kitt Peak	Spacewatch	·	1.1 km	MPC · JPL
717485	2016 UH_{26}	—	April 9, 2003	Palomar	NEAT	·	1.3 km	MPC · JPL
717486	2016 UH_{28}	—	November 7, 2007	Kitt Peak	Spacewatch	(13314)	1.6 km	MPC · JPL
717487	2016 UO_{28}	—	November 18, 1995	Kitt Peak	Spacewatch	·	1.0 km	MPC · JPL
717488	2016 UK_{30}	—	August 26, 2016	Haleakala	Pan-STARRS 1	·	1.8 km	MPC · JPL
717489	2016 UN_{30}	—	February 20, 2015	Haleakala	Pan-STARRS 1	·	1.7 km	MPC · JPL
717490	2016 UG_{32}	—	December 31, 2013	Haleakala	Pan-STARRS 1	·	1.4 km	MPC · JPL
717491	2016 UL_{32}	—	December 6, 2012	Mount Lemmon	Mount Lemmon Survey	·	1.7 km	MPC · JPL
717492	2016 UG_{34}	—	September 5, 2016	Mount Lemmon	Mount Lemmon Survey	·	1.3 km	MPC · JPL
717493	2016 UH_{34}	—	October 23, 2012	Haleakala	Pan-STARRS 1	·	1.0 km	MPC · JPL
717494	2016 US_{36}	—	November 26, 2011	Mount Lemmon	Mount Lemmon Survey	H	690 m	MPC · JPL
717495	2016 UL_{37}	—	October 4, 2016	Mount Lemmon	Mount Lemmon Survey	·	1.3 km	MPC · JPL
717496	2016 UO_{38}	—	August 17, 2016	Haleakala	Pan-STARRS 1	·	1.5 km	MPC · JPL
717497	2016 UR_{39}	—	December 23, 2012	Haleakala	Pan-STARRS 1	·	1.7 km	MPC · JPL
717498	2016 UW_{39}	—	January 31, 2009	Kitt Peak	Spacewatch	·	1.3 km	MPC · JPL
717499	2016 UJ_{40}	—	October 29, 2002	Palomar	NEAT	AGN	1 km	MPC · JPL
717500	2016 US_{40}	—	December 8, 2012	Mount Lemmon	Mount Lemmon Survey	(5)	940 m	MPC · JPL

== 717501–717600 ==
back to top

Designation			Discovery			Properties		Ref
Permanent	Provisional	Named after	Date	Site	Discoverer(s)	Category	Diam.	Ref
717501	2016 UY_{42}	—	September 7, 2011	Kitt Peak	Spacewatch	HOF	2.1 km	MPC · JPL
717502	2016 UE_{44}	—	June 4, 2006	Mount Lemmon	Mount Lemmon Survey	EUN	1.0 km	MPC · JPL
717503	2016 UK_{46}	—	November 5, 2007	Mount Lemmon	Mount Lemmon Survey	·	2.1 km	MPC · JPL
717504	2016 UT_{46}	—	March 22, 2015	Haleakala	Pan-STARRS 1	EUN	1.1 km	MPC · JPL
717505	2016 US_{47}	—	November 20, 2003	Kitt Peak	Deep Ecliptic Survey	·	1.8 km	MPC · JPL
717506	2016 UG_{48}	—	August 28, 2005	Kitt Peak	Spacewatch	·	2.0 km	MPC · JPL
717507	2016 UV_{48}	—	August 25, 2003	Palomar	NEAT	·	1.2 km	MPC · JPL
717508	2016 UF_{49}	—	September 21, 2011	Haleakala	Pan-STARRS 1	·	2.0 km	MPC · JPL
717509	2016 UT_{49}	—	October 4, 2016	Mount Lemmon	Mount Lemmon Survey	·	1.4 km	MPC · JPL
717510	2016 UM_{52}	—	November 19, 2003	Kitt Peak	Spacewatch	·	1.3 km	MPC · JPL
717511	2016 UA_{53}	—	October 21, 2007	Mount Lemmon	Mount Lemmon Survey	·	1.6 km	MPC · JPL
717512	2016 UO_{53}	—	September 28, 2003	Kitt Peak	Spacewatch	·	1.1 km	MPC · JPL
717513	2016 UN_{54}	—	March 24, 2014	Haleakala	Pan-STARRS 1	WIT	840 m	MPC · JPL
717514	2016 UU_{54}	—	September 27, 2003	Kitt Peak	Spacewatch	·	1.2 km	MPC · JPL
717515	2016 UO_{55}	—	October 20, 2012	Mount Lemmon	Mount Lemmon Survey	PHO	990 m	MPC · JPL
717516	2016 UD_{56}	—	October 26, 2016	Haleakala	Pan-STARRS 1	·	1.6 km	MPC · JPL
717517	2016 UR_{58}	—	January 9, 2007	Kitt Peak	Spacewatch	·	690 m	MPC · JPL
717518	2016 UN_{60}	—	September 13, 2007	Kitt Peak	Spacewatch	·	1.2 km	MPC · JPL
717519	2016 UT_{60}	—	July 9, 2011	Charleston	R. Holmes	·	2.2 km	MPC · JPL
717520	2016 UL_{61}	—	November 7, 2008	Mount Lemmon	Mount Lemmon Survey	·	1.0 km	MPC · JPL
717521	2016 UK_{62}	—	October 20, 2007	Mount Lemmon	Mount Lemmon Survey	·	1.7 km	MPC · JPL
717522	2016 UP_{63}	—	May 3, 2011	Kitt Peak	Spacewatch	EUN	860 m	MPC · JPL
717523	2016 UL_{64}	—	July 8, 2016	Haleakala	Pan-STARRS 1	·	2.5 km	MPC · JPL
717524	2016 UZ_{71}	—	October 2, 2016	Mount Lemmon	Mount Lemmon Survey	·	1.0 km	MPC · JPL
717525	2016 UN_{72}	—	October 6, 2016	Haleakala	Pan-STARRS 1	·	1.7 km	MPC · JPL
717526	2016 UG_{75}	—	October 12, 2016	Mount Lemmon	Mount Lemmon Survey	AST	1.6 km	MPC · JPL
717527	2016 UY_{75}	—	April 29, 2006	Kitt Peak	Spacewatch	·	1.5 km	MPC · JPL
717528	2016 UL_{77}	—	November 22, 2008	Kitt Peak	Spacewatch	·	900 m	MPC · JPL
717529	2016 UH_{78}	—	January 9, 2014	Haleakala	Pan-STARRS 1	·	650 m	MPC · JPL
717530	2016 UJ_{78}	—	December 28, 2013	Kitt Peak	Spacewatch	·	1.0 km	MPC · JPL
717531	2016 UL_{78}	—	September 21, 2008	Mount Lemmon	Mount Lemmon Survey	·	770 m	MPC · JPL
717532	2016 UT_{78}	—	November 15, 2010	Mount Lemmon	Mount Lemmon Survey	·	3.1 km	MPC · JPL
717533	2016 UC_{81}	—	October 10, 2016	Mount Lemmon	Mount Lemmon Survey	(29841)	1.1 km	MPC · JPL
717534	2016 UH_{82}	—	August 24, 2003	Cerro Tololo	Deep Ecliptic Survey	·	950 m	MPC · JPL
717535	2016 UB_{84}	—	December 30, 2008	Bergisch Gladbach	W. Bickel	·	1.5 km	MPC · JPL
717536	2016 UY_{86}	—	October 31, 2007	Mount Lemmon	Mount Lemmon Survey	·	1.4 km	MPC · JPL
717537	2016 UN_{87}	—	September 22, 2016	Mount Lemmon	Mount Lemmon Survey	·	890 m	MPC · JPL
717538	2016 UJ_{88}	—	April 2, 2014	Mount Lemmon	Mount Lemmon Survey	AGN	990 m	MPC · JPL
717539	2016 UH_{89}	—	April 3, 2011	Haleakala	Pan-STARRS 1	·	940 m	MPC · JPL
717540	2016 UJ_{90}	—	February 1, 2005	Catalina	CSS	·	1.3 km	MPC · JPL
717541	2016 UO_{93}	—	November 3, 2011	Kitt Peak	Spacewatch	·	1.3 km	MPC · JPL
717542	2016 UZ_{94}	—	October 6, 2016	Haleakala	Pan-STARRS 1	AGN	980 m	MPC · JPL
717543	2016 UQ_{95}	—	November 20, 2008	Kitt Peak	Spacewatch	·	1.1 km	MPC · JPL
717544	2016 UO_{96}	—	October 31, 2007	Mount Lemmon	Mount Lemmon Survey	·	1.4 km	MPC · JPL
717545	2016 UX_{96}	—	October 10, 2016	Mount Lemmon	Mount Lemmon Survey	AGN	850 m	MPC · JPL
717546	2016 UN_{97}	—	April 23, 2014	Cerro Tololo	DECam	·	1.3 km	MPC · JPL
717547	2016 UR_{97}	—	October 26, 2016	Haleakala	Pan-STARRS 1	KOR	920 m	MPC · JPL
717548	2016 UF_{98}	—	October 21, 2016	Mount Lemmon	Mount Lemmon Survey	·	1.0 km	MPC · JPL
717549	2016 US_{98}	—	October 10, 2007	Kitt Peak	Spacewatch	·	1.3 km	MPC · JPL
717550	2016 UY_{98}	—	May 21, 2015	Haleakala	Pan-STARRS 1	·	1.1 km	MPC · JPL
717551	2016 US_{99}	—	November 24, 2012	Kitt Peak	Spacewatch	·	1.2 km	MPC · JPL
717552	2016 UA_{100}	—	October 12, 2016	Mount Lemmon	Mount Lemmon Survey	·	1.4 km	MPC · JPL
717553	2016 UK_{100}	—	August 20, 2011	Haleakala	Pan-STARRS 1	AGN	940 m	MPC · JPL
717554	2016 UN_{103}	—	April 9, 2005	Mount Lemmon	Mount Lemmon Survey	·	1.4 km	MPC · JPL
717555	2016 UA_{108}	—	September 30, 2016	Haleakala	Pan-STARRS 1	NYS	850 m	MPC · JPL
717556	2016 UF_{108}	—	January 16, 2013	Haleakala	Pan-STARRS 1	KOR	990 m	MPC · JPL
717557	2016 UP_{108}	—	October 19, 2016	Mount Lemmon	Mount Lemmon Survey	AST	1.3 km	MPC · JPL
717558	2016 UW_{110}	—	May 4, 2005	Mauna Kea	Veillet, C.	AST	1.2 km	MPC · JPL
717559	2016 UG_{112}	—	March 26, 2007	Kitt Peak	Spacewatch	·	830 m	MPC · JPL
717560	2016 UT_{116}	—	October 10, 2012	Kitt Peak	Spacewatch	(5)	780 m	MPC · JPL
717561	2016 UU_{119}	—	April 26, 2006	Cerro Tololo	Deep Ecliptic Survey	·	1.1 km	MPC · JPL
717562	2016 UH_{121}	—	April 18, 2015	Mount Lemmon	Mount Lemmon Survey	·	530 m	MPC · JPL
717563	2016 UK_{124}	—	August 1, 2016	Haleakala	Pan-STARRS 1	·	1.4 km	MPC · JPL
717564	2016 UX_{127}	—	October 23, 2003	Kitt Peak	Spacewatch	·	1.4 km	MPC · JPL
717565	2016 UU_{129}	—	October 18, 2007	Mount Lemmon	Mount Lemmon Survey	·	1.2 km	MPC · JPL
717566	2016 UX_{129}	—	March 28, 2014	Mount Lemmon	Mount Lemmon Survey	MAR	780 m	MPC · JPL
717567	2016 UF_{133}	—	November 1, 2007	Kitt Peak	Spacewatch	AGN	870 m	MPC · JPL
717568	2016 UY_{134}	—	October 26, 2016	Haleakala	Pan-STARRS 1	·	1.2 km	MPC · JPL
717569	2016 UJ_{135}	—	October 7, 2016	Mount Lemmon	Mount Lemmon Survey	·	1.6 km	MPC · JPL
717570	2016 UP_{135}	—	November 5, 2012	Kitt Peak	Spacewatch	(5)	1.2 km	MPC · JPL
717571	2016 UZ_{135}	—	October 27, 2016	Haleakala	Pan-STARRS 1	·	1.5 km	MPC · JPL
717572	2016 UC_{137}	—	October 27, 2016	Haleakala	Pan-STARRS 1	·	1.3 km	MPC · JPL
717573	2016 UN_{140}	—	October 29, 2016	Haleakala	Pan-STARRS 1	·	1.2 km	MPC · JPL
717574	2016 UX_{140}	—	October 19, 2007	Mount Lemmon	Mount Lemmon Survey	·	1.9 km	MPC · JPL
717575	2016 UB_{142}	—	April 4, 2014	Haleakala	Pan-STARRS 1	·	1.3 km	MPC · JPL
717576	2016 UE_{144}	—	August 14, 2012	Haleakala	Pan-STARRS 1	·	1.5 km	MPC · JPL
717577	2016 UX_{144}	—	August 10, 2016	Haleakala	Pan-STARRS 1	·	1.0 km	MPC · JPL
717578	2016 US_{145}	—	September 18, 2003	Kitt Peak	Spacewatch	·	1.3 km	MPC · JPL
717579	2016 UD_{147}	—	October 3, 2003	Kitt Peak	Spacewatch	EUN	1.1 km	MPC · JPL
717580	2016 UZ_{148}	—	November 7, 2012	Kitt Peak	Spacewatch	·	1.3 km	MPC · JPL
717581	2016 UF_{154}	—	August 27, 2003	Palomar	NEAT	·	1.3 km	MPC · JPL
717582	2016 UA_{155}	—	October 26, 2016	Mount Lemmon	Mount Lemmon Survey	MAR	840 m	MPC · JPL
717583	2016 UL_{168}	—	October 27, 2016	Mount Lemmon	Mount Lemmon Survey	fast	910 m	MPC · JPL
717584	2016 UD_{170}	—	May 21, 2014	Haleakala	Pan-STARRS 1	AEO	810 m	MPC · JPL
717585	2016 UZ_{170}	—	October 20, 2016	Mount Lemmon	Mount Lemmon Survey	·	1.2 km	MPC · JPL
717586	2016 UD_{186}	—	April 2, 2014	Mount Lemmon	Mount Lemmon Survey	·	1.3 km	MPC · JPL
717587	2016 UF_{191}	—	April 2, 2019	Haleakala	Pan-STARRS 1	·	930 m	MPC · JPL
717588	2016 UH_{208}	—	October 27, 2016	Mount Lemmon	Mount Lemmon Survey	KOR	820 m	MPC · JPL
717589	2016 UD_{247}	—	October 20, 2016	Mount Lemmon	Mount Lemmon Survey	MRX	890 m	MPC · JPL
717590	2016 UE_{247}	—	October 29, 2016	Mount Lemmon	Mount Lemmon Survey	·	1.6 km	MPC · JPL
717591	2016 UY_{247}	—	October 28, 2016	Haleakala	Pan-STARRS 1	·	1.6 km	MPC · JPL
717592	2016 UD_{249}	—	October 25, 2016	Haleakala	Pan-STARRS 1	·	1.4 km	MPC · JPL
717593	2016 UR_{249}	—	October 25, 2016	Haleakala	Pan-STARRS 1	·	1.3 km	MPC · JPL
717594	2016 UQ_{250}	—	October 29, 2016	Mount Lemmon	Mount Lemmon Survey	(1547)	1.2 km	MPC · JPL
717595	2016 UR_{250}	—	October 31, 2016	Mount Lemmon	Mount Lemmon Survey	·	1.3 km	MPC · JPL
717596	2016 UW_{250}	—	October 20, 2016	Mount Lemmon	Mount Lemmon Survey	AGN	850 m	MPC · JPL
717597	2016 UL_{251}	—	October 21, 2016	Mount Lemmon	Mount Lemmon Survey	·	1.2 km	MPC · JPL
717598	2016 UV_{251}	—	October 19, 2016	Mount Lemmon	Mount Lemmon Survey	·	1.3 km	MPC · JPL
717599	2016 UH_{252}	—	October 21, 2016	Mount Lemmon	Mount Lemmon Survey	·	1.3 km	MPC · JPL
717600	2016 UU_{253}	—	October 27, 2016	Mount Lemmon	Mount Lemmon Survey	·	1.5 km	MPC · JPL

== 717601–717700 ==
back to top

Designation			Discovery			Properties		Ref
Permanent	Provisional	Named after	Date	Site	Discoverer(s)	Category	Diam.	Ref
717601	2016 UP_{254}	—	October 19, 2016	Mount Lemmon	Mount Lemmon Survey	·	1.2 km	MPC · JPL
717602	2016 UX_{255}	—	January 22, 2013	La Silla	La Silla	·	1.4 km	MPC · JPL
717603	2016 UA_{257}	—	October 21, 2016	Mount Lemmon	Mount Lemmon Survey	·	1.3 km	MPC · JPL
717604	2016 UL_{260}	—	October 27, 2016	Mount Lemmon	Mount Lemmon Survey	·	1.5 km	MPC · JPL
717605	2016 UQ_{266}	—	October 25, 2016	Haleakala	Pan-STARRS 1	·	500 m	MPC · JPL
717606	2016 UJ_{274}	—	October 21, 2016	Mount Lemmon	Mount Lemmon Survey	·	910 m	MPC · JPL
717607	2016 UL_{276}	—	October 21, 2016	Mount Lemmon	Mount Lemmon Survey	EOS	1.5 km	MPC · JPL
717608	2016 UQ_{276}	—	October 28, 2016	Haleakala	Pan-STARRS 1	·	2.6 km	MPC · JPL
717609	2016 UQ_{284}	—	October 22, 2016	Mount Lemmon	Mount Lemmon Survey	·	2.6 km	MPC · JPL
717610	2016 VF_{7}	—	December 13, 2012	Nogales	M. Schwartz, P. R. Holvorcem	EUN	1.1 km	MPC · JPL
717611	2016 VP_{8}	—	October 23, 2003	Kitt Peak	Spacewatch	EUN	860 m	MPC · JPL
717612	2016 VC_{9}	—	April 2, 2014	Mount Lemmon	Mount Lemmon Survey	HOF	2.0 km	MPC · JPL
717613	2016 VJ_{9}	—	December 12, 2012	Mount Lemmon	Mount Lemmon Survey	·	1.0 km	MPC · JPL
717614	2016 VL_{9}	—	November 3, 1999	Ondřejov	Ondrejov	EUN	1.2 km	MPC · JPL
717615	2016 VP_{10}	—	September 24, 2005	Kitt Peak	Spacewatch	·	900 m	MPC · JPL
717616	2016 VR_{10}	—	October 21, 2016	Mount Lemmon	Mount Lemmon Survey	·	1.5 km	MPC · JPL
717617	2016 VT_{11}	—	October 7, 2016	Mount Lemmon	Mount Lemmon Survey	·	1.3 km	MPC · JPL
717618	2016 VV_{11}	—	December 9, 2012	Haleakala	Pan-STARRS 1	·	1.4 km	MPC · JPL
717619	2016 VB_{12}	—	July 28, 2011	Haleakala	Pan-STARRS 1	·	1.8 km	MPC · JPL
717620	2016 VH_{12}	—	October 12, 2016	Mount Lemmon	Mount Lemmon Survey	HYG	1.7 km	MPC · JPL
717621	2016 VQ_{12}	—	September 27, 2003	Kitt Peak	Spacewatch	·	1.1 km	MPC · JPL
717622	2016 VX_{13}	—	January 31, 2009	Mount Lemmon	Mount Lemmon Survey	WIT	730 m	MPC · JPL
717623	2016 VR_{14}	—	November 4, 2010	Mount Lemmon	Mount Lemmon Survey	EOS	1.8 km	MPC · JPL
717624	2016 VC_{15}	—	November 3, 2007	Mount Lemmon	Mount Lemmon Survey	·	2.2 km	MPC · JPL
717625	2016 VZ_{16}	—	October 5, 2011	Haleakala	Pan-STARRS 1	·	1.8 km	MPC · JPL
717626	2016 VV_{17}	—	October 14, 2006	Bergisch Gladbach	W. Bickel	KOR	1.2 km	MPC · JPL
717627	2016 VJ_{18}	—	December 22, 2012	Haleakala	Pan-STARRS 1	·	2.2 km	MPC · JPL
717628	2016 VY_{18}	—	September 28, 2011	Kitt Peak	Spacewatch	BRA	1.1 km	MPC · JPL
717629	2016 VT_{19}	—	December 21, 2012	Sandlot	G. Hug	EUN	1.1 km	MPC · JPL
717630	2016 VZ_{19}	—	July 27, 2011	Haleakala	Pan-STARRS 1	·	1.3 km	MPC · JPL
717631	2016 VA_{20}	—	July 25, 2015	Haleakala	Pan-STARRS 1	·	950 m	MPC · JPL
717632	2016 VO_{20}	—	October 26, 2011	Mayhill-ISON	L. Elenin	·	1.8 km	MPC · JPL
717633	2016 VQ_{20}	—	January 2, 2012	Kitt Peak	Spacewatch	·	1.7 km	MPC · JPL
717634	2016 VS_{20}	—	December 2, 2010	Mount Lemmon	Mount Lemmon Survey	LIX	2.8 km	MPC · JPL
717635	2016 VV_{20}	—	September 20, 2015	Mount Lemmon	Mount Lemmon Survey	·	2.4 km	MPC · JPL
717636	2016 VA_{21}	—	March 13, 2013	Palomar	Palomar Transient Factory	GEF	1.2 km	MPC · JPL
717637	2016 VD_{21}	—	September 21, 2011	Haleakala	Pan-STARRS 1	·	900 m	MPC · JPL
717638	2016 VH_{21}	—	May 2, 2014	Mount Lemmon	Mount Lemmon Survey	·	1.3 km	MPC · JPL
717639	2016 VJ_{21}	—	October 25, 2005	Mount Lemmon	Mount Lemmon Survey	·	1.7 km	MPC · JPL
717640	2016 VO_{21}	—	January 15, 2011	Mount Lemmon	Mount Lemmon Survey	LUT	4.3 km	MPC · JPL
717641	2016 VR_{28}	—	November 10, 2016	Haleakala	Pan-STARRS 1	·	1.8 km	MPC · JPL
717642	2016 VU_{28}	—	November 10, 2016	Haleakala	Pan-STARRS 1	·	1.7 km	MPC · JPL
717643	2016 VL_{29}	—	November 10, 2016	Haleakala	Pan-STARRS 1	·	3.1 km	MPC · JPL
717644	2016 VU_{29}	—	November 6, 2016	Haleakala	Pan-STARRS 1	·	1.6 km	MPC · JPL
717645	2016 VQ_{30}	—	November 3, 2016	Haleakala	Pan-STARRS 1	·	1.7 km	MPC · JPL
717646	2016 VN_{31}	—	November 4, 2016	Haleakala	Pan-STARRS 1	·	1.4 km	MPC · JPL
717647	2016 VF_{33}	—	November 4, 2016	Haleakala	Pan-STARRS 1	·	1.2 km	MPC · JPL
717648	2016 VX_{33}	—	October 10, 2016	Mount Lemmon	Mount Lemmon Survey	MAR	1.0 km	MPC · JPL
717649	2016 VB_{34}	—	November 6, 2016	Mount Lemmon	Mount Lemmon Survey	·	990 m	MPC · JPL
717650	2016 VJ_{34}	—	November 4, 2016	Haleakala	Pan-STARRS 1	·	1.6 km	MPC · JPL
717651	2016 VT_{36}	—	November 6, 2016	Mount Lemmon	Mount Lemmon Survey	·	1.6 km	MPC · JPL
717652	2016 VJ_{40}	—	November 10, 2016	Haleakala	Pan-STARRS 1	·	1.4 km	MPC · JPL
717653	2016 VN_{49}	—	June 26, 2015	Haleakala	Pan-STARRS 1	(17392)	1.1 km	MPC · JPL
717654	2016 VS_{49}	—	November 3, 2016	Haleakala	Pan-STARRS 1	·	2.4 km	MPC · JPL
717655	2016 VW_{56}	—	November 8, 2016	Haleakala	Pan-STARRS 1	·	2.9 km	MPC · JPL
717656	2016 VV_{59}	—	November 6, 2016	Mount Lemmon	Mount Lemmon Survey	·	1.2 km	MPC · JPL
717657	2016 WG_{5}	—	December 11, 2012	Mount Lemmon	Mount Lemmon Survey	·	1.1 km	MPC · JPL
717658	2016 WJ_{6}	—	November 17, 2007	Kitt Peak	Spacewatch	AGN	960 m	MPC · JPL
717659	2016 WU_{6}	—	August 16, 2016	Haleakala	Pan-STARRS 1	·	1.4 km	MPC · JPL
717660	2016 WC_{9}	—	July 10, 2016	Mount Lemmon	Mount Lemmon Survey	BAR	1.0 km	MPC · JPL
717661	2016 WJ_{10}	—	December 3, 2012	Mount Lemmon	Mount Lemmon Survey	·	1.1 km	MPC · JPL
717662	2016 WX_{12}	—	June 20, 2015	Haleakala	Pan-STARRS 1	EUN	1.1 km	MPC · JPL
717663	2016 WN_{13}	—	October 4, 2016	Mount Lemmon	Mount Lemmon Survey	·	1.1 km	MPC · JPL
717664	2016 WL_{14}	—	September 19, 2003	Palomar	NEAT	·	1.1 km	MPC · JPL
717665	2016 WG_{18}	—	April 22, 2009	Mount Lemmon	Mount Lemmon Survey	·	840 m	MPC · JPL
717666	2016 WX_{18}	—	February 9, 2005	Mount Lemmon	Mount Lemmon Survey	·	1.2 km	MPC · JPL
717667	2016 WE_{20}	—	February 28, 2014	Haleakala	Pan-STARRS 1	·	1.2 km	MPC · JPL
717668	2016 WS_{20}	—	December 10, 2012	Kitt Peak	Spacewatch	·	1.7 km	MPC · JPL
717669	2016 WN_{22}	—	November 24, 2011	Haleakala	Pan-STARRS 1	·	2.2 km	MPC · JPL
717670	2016 WA_{23}	—	December 5, 2007	Kitt Peak	Spacewatch	·	1.4 km	MPC · JPL
717671	2016 WW_{27}	—	June 5, 2014	Haleakala	Pan-STARRS 1	·	1.9 km	MPC · JPL
717672	2016 WE_{29}	—	August 27, 2006	Kitt Peak	Spacewatch	·	600 m	MPC · JPL
717673	2016 WQ_{29}	—	September 15, 2004	Kitt Peak	Spacewatch	·	2.2 km	MPC · JPL
717674	2016 WE_{31}	—	November 11, 2016	Mount Lemmon	Mount Lemmon Survey	EUN	1.2 km	MPC · JPL
717675	2016 WE_{33}	—	December 31, 2007	Mount Lemmon	Mount Lemmon Survey	·	1.4 km	MPC · JPL
717676	2016 WC_{34}	—	September 28, 2011	Mount Lemmon	Mount Lemmon Survey	·	1.6 km	MPC · JPL
717677	2016 WW_{35}	—	December 14, 2003	Kitt Peak	Spacewatch	·	1.8 km	MPC · JPL
717678	2016 WR_{36}	—	November 21, 2003	Kitt Peak	Spacewatch	·	1.2 km	MPC · JPL
717679	2016 WS_{36}	—	September 4, 2011	Haleakala	Pan-STARRS 1	·	1.2 km	MPC · JPL
717680	2016 WV_{36}	—	September 12, 2007	Mount Lemmon	Mount Lemmon Survey	·	1.1 km	MPC · JPL
717681	2016 WG_{38}	—	March 11, 2014	Mount Lemmon	Mount Lemmon Survey	·	940 m	MPC · JPL
717682	2016 WA_{39}	—	November 4, 2016	Haleakala	Pan-STARRS 1	·	1.6 km	MPC · JPL
717683	2016 WU_{39}	—	October 21, 2011	Mount Lemmon	Mount Lemmon Survey	NAE	1.9 km	MPC · JPL
717684	2016 WU_{40}	—	January 17, 2013	Haleakala	Pan-STARRS 1	·	1.7 km	MPC · JPL
717685	2016 WE_{41}	—	November 4, 2016	Haleakala	Pan-STARRS 1	·	1.4 km	MPC · JPL
717686	2016 WU_{41}	—	October 23, 2016	Mount Lemmon	Mount Lemmon Survey	·	1.5 km	MPC · JPL
717687	2016 WQ_{42}	—	September 30, 2003	Kitt Peak	Spacewatch	·	1.2 km	MPC · JPL
717688	2016 WC_{43}	—	October 2, 2006	Mount Lemmon	Mount Lemmon Survey	·	1.7 km	MPC · JPL
717689	2016 WG_{43}	—	November 11, 2016	Kitt Peak	Spacewatch	·	960 m	MPC · JPL
717690	2016 WE_{44}	—	September 25, 2012	Kitt Peak	Spacewatch	·	900 m	MPC · JPL
717691	2016 WG_{44}	—	June 24, 2015	Haleakala	Pan-STARRS 1	HNS	980 m	MPC · JPL
717692	2016 WO_{44}	—	November 10, 2016	Mount Lemmon	Mount Lemmon Survey	·	1.4 km	MPC · JPL
717693	2016 WQ_{45}	—	October 24, 2003	Kitt Peak	Spacewatch	·	1.6 km	MPC · JPL
717694	2016 WR_{45}	—	July 9, 2015	Haleakala	Pan-STARRS 1	·	1.1 km	MPC · JPL
717695	2016 WU_{46}	—	November 23, 2008	Mount Lemmon	Mount Lemmon Survey	·	1.5 km	MPC · JPL
717696	2016 WC_{52}	—	December 10, 2004	Kitt Peak	Spacewatch	(5)	1.3 km	MPC · JPL
717697	2016 WW_{55}	—	February 25, 2009	Calar Alto	F. Hormuth	·	1.5 km	MPC · JPL
717698	2016 WC_{56}	—	February 10, 2014	Haleakala	Pan-STARRS 1	EUN	1.3 km	MPC · JPL
717699	2016 WG_{57}	—	March 10, 2005	Mount Lemmon	Mount Lemmon Survey	HNS	1.4 km	MPC · JPL
717700	2016 WP_{62}	—	November 25, 2016	Mount Lemmon	Mount Lemmon Survey	DOR	2.1 km	MPC · JPL

== 717701–717800 ==
back to top

Designation			Discovery			Properties		Ref
Permanent	Provisional	Named after	Date	Site	Discoverer(s)	Category	Diam.	Ref
717701	2016 WZ_{62}	—	October 27, 2016	Mount Lemmon	Mount Lemmon Survey	·	1.7 km	MPC · JPL
717702	2016 WD_{63}	—	November 28, 2016	Haleakala	Pan-STARRS 1	BRA	1.2 km	MPC · JPL
717703	2016 WF_{63}	—	November 20, 2016	Mount Lemmon	Mount Lemmon Survey	·	1.4 km	MPC · JPL
717704	2016 WH_{63}	—	November 25, 2016	Mount Lemmon	Mount Lemmon Survey	·	1.3 km	MPC · JPL
717705	2016 WG_{64}	—	November 24, 2016	Haleakala	Pan-STARRS 1	·	1.2 km	MPC · JPL
717706	2016 WC_{65}	—	November 25, 2016	Mount Lemmon	Mount Lemmon Survey	·	1.6 km	MPC · JPL
717707	2016 WF_{65}	—	November 20, 2016	Mount Lemmon	Mount Lemmon Survey	HOF	1.9 km	MPC · JPL
717708	2016 WR_{65}	—	November 30, 2016	Mount Lemmon	Mount Lemmon Survey	·	1.4 km	MPC · JPL
717709	2016 WQ_{73}	—	July 19, 2015	Haleakala	Pan-STARRS 1	EOS	1.5 km	MPC · JPL
717710	2016 WS_{73}	—	November 30, 2016	Mount Lemmon	Mount Lemmon Survey	EOS	1.4 km	MPC · JPL
717711	2016 WZ_{74}	—	November 24, 2016	Mount Lemmon	Mount Lemmon Survey	·	2.2 km	MPC · JPL
717712	2016 WD_{76}	—	November 25, 2016	Mount Lemmon	Mount Lemmon Survey	·	2.1 km	MPC · JPL
717713	2016 WA_{77}	—	August 21, 2015	Haleakala	Pan-STARRS 1	EOS	1.2 km	MPC · JPL
717714	2016 WO_{78}	—	November 19, 2016	Mount Lemmon	Mount Lemmon Survey	·	1.4 km	MPC · JPL
717715	2016 WD_{81}	—	November 25, 2016	Mount Lemmon	Mount Lemmon Survey	·	1.3 km	MPC · JPL
717716	2016 WC_{82}	—	September 29, 2011	Mount Lemmon	Mount Lemmon Survey	·	1.3 km	MPC · JPL
717717	2016 WZ_{82}	—	November 25, 2016	Mount Lemmon	Mount Lemmon Survey	·	1.4 km	MPC · JPL
717718	2016 XT	—	October 15, 2007	Kitt Peak	Spacewatch	·	1.3 km	MPC · JPL
717719	2016 XM_{5}	—	October 24, 2016	Mount Lemmon	Mount Lemmon Survey	H	470 m	MPC · JPL
717720	2016 XD_{6}	—	December 22, 2012	Haleakala	Pan-STARRS 1	(5)	1.0 km	MPC · JPL
717721	2016 XW_{6}	—	September 2, 2016	Mount Lemmon	Mount Lemmon Survey	·	1.0 km	MPC · JPL
717722	2016 XK_{7}	—	November 16, 2007	Mount Lemmon	Mount Lemmon Survey	526	2.1 km	MPC · JPL
717723	2016 XM_{7}	—	October 6, 2016	Mount Lemmon	Mount Lemmon Survey	(194)	1.2 km	MPC · JPL
717724	2016 XU_{9}	—	April 23, 2014	Cerro Tololo	DECam	·	1.2 km	MPC · JPL
717725	2016 XB_{10}	—	November 9, 2016	Mount Lemmon	Mount Lemmon Survey	(5)	1.2 km	MPC · JPL
717726	2016 XS_{10}	—	November 4, 2016	Haleakala	Pan-STARRS 1	EOS	1.4 km	MPC · JPL
717727	2016 XF_{12}	—	April 10, 2010	Mount Lemmon	Mount Lemmon Survey	·	860 m	MPC · JPL
717728	2016 XH_{12}	—	September 26, 2011	Mount Lemmon	Mount Lemmon Survey	·	1.3 km	MPC · JPL
717729	2016 XN_{13}	—	July 18, 2007	Mount Lemmon	Mount Lemmon Survey	·	1.2 km	MPC · JPL
717730	2016 XT_{15}	—	September 3, 2010	Mount Lemmon	Mount Lemmon Survey	·	2.6 km	MPC · JPL
717731	2016 XH_{16}	—	September 29, 2011	Mount Lemmon	Mount Lemmon Survey	·	2.0 km	MPC · JPL
717732	2016 XG_{20}	—	September 21, 2003	Anderson Mesa	LONEOS	EUN	900 m	MPC · JPL
717733	2016 XL_{20}	—	July 25, 2011	Haleakala	Pan-STARRS 1	·	1.3 km	MPC · JPL
717734	2016 XS_{20}	—	September 16, 2013	Mount Lemmon	Mount Lemmon Survey	H	470 m	MPC · JPL
717735	2016 XF_{21}	—	December 1, 2005	Catalina	CSS	·	2.4 km	MPC · JPL
717736	2016 XD_{23}	—	October 8, 2007	Mount Lemmon	Mount Lemmon Survey	·	1.4 km	MPC · JPL
717737	2016 XD_{26}	—	December 21, 2004	Catalina	CSS	L5	10 km	MPC · JPL
717738	2016 XQ_{26}	—	December 1, 2016	Mount Lemmon	Mount Lemmon Survey	·	1.6 km	MPC · JPL
717739	2016 XN_{27}	—	December 5, 2016	Mount Lemmon	Mount Lemmon Survey	·	2.5 km	MPC · JPL
717740	2016 XB_{28}	—	December 5, 2016	Mount Lemmon	Mount Lemmon Survey	·	2.4 km	MPC · JPL
717741	2016 XY_{31}	—	December 4, 2016	Mount Lemmon	Mount Lemmon Survey	EUN	1.0 km	MPC · JPL
717742	2016 XT_{34}	—	December 9, 2016	Mount Lemmon	Mount Lemmon Survey	·	2.4 km	MPC · JPL
717743	2016 XT_{35}	—	December 9, 2016	Mount Lemmon	Mount Lemmon Survey	EOS	1.4 km	MPC · JPL
717744	2016 XA_{36}	—	December 5, 2016	Mount Lemmon	Mount Lemmon Survey	·	1.9 km	MPC · JPL
717745	2016 YQ_{1}	—	September 25, 2007	Mount Lemmon	Mount Lemmon Survey	·	1.5 km	MPC · JPL
717746	2016 YV_{2}	—	November 15, 2006	Mount Lemmon	Mount Lemmon Survey	·	2.6 km	MPC · JPL
717747	2016 YL_{7}	—	October 19, 2007	Catalina	CSS	·	1.2 km	MPC · JPL
717748	2016 YM_{7}	—	November 4, 2005	Catalina	CSS	EOS	1.7 km	MPC · JPL
717749	2016 YT_{7}	—	December 6, 2016	Mount Lemmon	Mount Lemmon Survey	·	2.4 km	MPC · JPL
717750	2016 YH_{10}	—	November 8, 2007	Mount Lemmon	Mount Lemmon Survey	·	1.9 km	MPC · JPL
717751	2016 YV_{11}	—	December 11, 2012	Catalina	CSS	·	2.3 km	MPC · JPL
717752	2016 YW_{11}	—	December 1, 2005	Mount Lemmon	Mount Lemmon Survey	TIR	2.8 km	MPC · JPL
717753	2016 YZ_{12}	—	March 17, 2012	Mount Lemmon	Mount Lemmon Survey	·	2.3 km	MPC · JPL
717754	2016 YK_{13}	—	October 13, 2016	Haleakala	Pan-STARRS 1	·	1.2 km	MPC · JPL
717755	2016 YM_{13}	—	December 23, 2016	Haleakala	Pan-STARRS 1	·	1.0 km	MPC · JPL
717756	2016 YS_{13}	—	March 15, 2012	Mount Lemmon	Mount Lemmon Survey	·	2.7 km	MPC · JPL
717757	2016 YV_{13}	—	October 3, 2011	Charleston	R. Holmes	·	1.7 km	MPC · JPL
717758	2016 YC_{14}	—	April 10, 2013	Haleakala	Pan-STARRS 1	·	1.7 km	MPC · JPL
717759	2016 YH_{15}	—	October 31, 2010	Mount Lemmon	Mount Lemmon Survey	·	2.2 km	MPC · JPL
717760	2016 YJ_{19}	—	December 24, 2016	Mount Lemmon	Mount Lemmon Survey	·	1.8 km	MPC · JPL
717761	2016 YG_{20}	—	December 22, 2016	Haleakala	Pan-STARRS 1	·	1.4 km	MPC · JPL
717762	2016 YR_{26}	—	December 23, 2016	Haleakala	Pan-STARRS 1	·	2.2 km	MPC · JPL
717763	2016 YJ_{30}	—	December 19, 2016	Mount Lemmon	Mount Lemmon Survey	TIR	2.5 km	MPC · JPL
717764	2017 AQ_{3}	—	February 24, 2015	Haleakala	Pan-STARRS 1	H	360 m	MPC · JPL
717765	2017 AE_{8}	—	November 1, 2010	Kitt Peak	Spacewatch	·	2.1 km	MPC · JPL
717766	2017 AU_{8}	—	August 27, 2003	Palomar	NEAT	EUN	1.2 km	MPC · JPL
717767	2017 AP_{9}	—	November 26, 2016	Haleakala	Pan-STARRS 1	·	2.8 km	MPC · JPL
717768	2017 AG_{10}	—	January 3, 2017	Haleakala	Pan-STARRS 1	·	2.7 km	MPC · JPL
717769	2017 AK_{10}	—	December 8, 2015	Mount Lemmon	Mount Lemmon Survey	·	2.4 km	MPC · JPL
717770	2017 AX_{10}	—	January 3, 2017	Haleakala	Pan-STARRS 1	EOS	1.5 km	MPC · JPL
717771	2017 AM_{11}	—	February 23, 2012	Mount Lemmon	Mount Lemmon Survey	·	2.1 km	MPC · JPL
717772	2017 AH_{12}	—	November 18, 2011	Mount Lemmon	Mount Lemmon Survey	·	1.6 km	MPC · JPL
717773	2017 AJ_{12}	—	March 12, 2002	Kitt Peak	Spacewatch	NYS	1.1 km	MPC · JPL
717774	2017 AV_{15}	—	September 3, 2010	Mount Lemmon	Mount Lemmon Survey	·	2.1 km	MPC · JPL
717775	2017 AZ_{15}	—	January 25, 2012	Haleakala	Pan-STARRS 1	·	2.5 km	MPC · JPL
717776	2017 AR_{18}	—	December 30, 2007	Kitt Peak	Spacewatch	·	1.6 km	MPC · JPL
717777	2017 AW_{18}	—	September 12, 2015	Haleakala	Pan-STARRS 1	AGN	980 m	MPC · JPL
717778	2017 AE_{20}	—	August 13, 2015	Haleakala	Pan-STARRS 1	615	1.3 km	MPC · JPL
717779	2017 AH_{20}	—	April 16, 2004	Apache Point	SDSS Collaboration	H	530 m	MPC · JPL
717780	2017 AC_{22}	—	August 30, 2014	Mount Lemmon	Mount Lemmon Survey	VER	2.4 km	MPC · JPL
717781	2017 AD_{22}	—	December 3, 2010	Kitt Peak	Spacewatch	·	2.1 km	MPC · JPL
717782	2017 AG_{22}	—	August 18, 2009	Kitt Peak	Spacewatch	·	2.8 km	MPC · JPL
717783	2017 AL_{22}	—	March 27, 2012	Kitt Peak	Spacewatch	·	3.0 km	MPC · JPL
717784	2017 AS_{23}	—	February 20, 2009	Kitt Peak	Spacewatch	(5)	870 m	MPC · JPL
717785	2017 AF_{37}	—	January 3, 2017	Haleakala	Pan-STARRS 1	·	3.3 km	MPC · JPL
717786	2017 AY_{37}	—	January 7, 2017	Mount Lemmon	Mount Lemmon Survey	·	1.7 km	MPC · JPL
717787	2017 AD_{39}	—	January 4, 2017	Haleakala	Pan-STARRS 1	·	1.4 km	MPC · JPL
717788	2017 AO_{39}	—	January 3, 2017	Haleakala	Pan-STARRS 1	·	1.4 km	MPC · JPL
717789	2017 AU_{43}	—	August 28, 2014	Haleakala	Pan-STARRS 1	·	2.1 km	MPC · JPL
717790	2017 AQ_{48}	—	November 20, 2007	Mount Lemmon	Mount Lemmon Survey	·	860 m	MPC · JPL
717791	2017 AK_{51}	—	January 3, 2017	Haleakala	Pan-STARRS 1	·	1.1 km	MPC · JPL
717792	2017 AG_{52}	—	February 1, 2012	Mount Lemmon	Mount Lemmon Survey	·	2.0 km	MPC · JPL
717793	2017 AK_{60}	—	January 4, 2017	Haleakala	Pan-STARRS 1	·	1.4 km	MPC · JPL
717794	2017 AZ_{60}	—	March 15, 2007	Kitt Peak	Spacewatch	EOS	1.2 km	MPC · JPL
717795	2017 BJ_{1}	—	November 11, 2007	Mount Lemmon	Mount Lemmon Survey	·	1.6 km	MPC · JPL
717796	2017 BX_{1}	—	January 20, 2006	Anderson Mesa	LONEOS	·	3.1 km	MPC · JPL
717797	2017 BG_{2}	—	March 24, 2012	Catalina	CSS	·	2.4 km	MPC · JPL
717798	2017 BL_{2}	—	January 20, 2017	Wildberg	R. Apitzsch	·	2.7 km	MPC · JPL
717799	2017 BX_{4}	—	September 23, 2015	Haleakala	Pan-STARRS 1	·	1.7 km	MPC · JPL
717800	2017 BL_{7}	—	November 20, 2015	Mount Lemmon	Mount Lemmon Survey	EUP	3.0 km	MPC · JPL

== 717801–717900 ==
back to top

Designation			Discovery			Properties		Ref
Permanent	Provisional	Named after	Date	Site	Discoverer(s)	Category	Diam.	Ref
717801	2017 BS_{7}	—	February 24, 2006	Palomar	NEAT	·	2.9 km	MPC · JPL
717802	2017 BG_{8}	—	April 1, 2009	Cerro Burek	I. de la Cueva	·	2.3 km	MPC · JPL
717803	2017 BR_{8}	—	May 22, 2012	Kitt Peak	Spacewatch	T_{j} (2.98) · EUP	2.5 km	MPC · JPL
717804	2017 BA_{12}	—	August 25, 2004	Kitt Peak	Spacewatch	EOS	2.0 km	MPC · JPL
717805	2017 BL_{13}	—	October 23, 2011	Haleakala	Pan-STARRS 1	·	1.8 km	MPC · JPL
717806	2017 BJ_{14}	—	December 4, 2011	Haleakala	Pan-STARRS 1	·	3.6 km	MPC · JPL
717807	2017 BO_{18}	—	October 18, 2006	Kitt Peak	Spacewatch	HOF	2.3 km	MPC · JPL
717808	2017 BZ_{18}	—	July 30, 2014	Haleakala	Pan-STARRS 1	·	2.3 km	MPC · JPL
717809	2017 BS_{22}	—	October 2, 2015	Mount Lemmon	Mount Lemmon Survey	HOF	2.2 km	MPC · JPL
717810	2017 BV_{22}	—	January 26, 2017	Haleakala	Pan-STARRS 1	·	2.2 km	MPC · JPL
717811	2017 BW_{23}	—	January 10, 2013	Haleakala	Pan-STARRS 1	·	1.1 km	MPC · JPL
717812	2017 BB_{24}	—	September 4, 2014	Haleakala	Pan-STARRS 1	EOS	2.3 km	MPC · JPL
717813	2017 BR_{24}	—	July 25, 2014	Haleakala	Pan-STARRS 1	EOS	1.5 km	MPC · JPL
717814	2017 BX_{24}	—	October 28, 2010	Mount Lemmon	Mount Lemmon Survey	·	1.5 km	MPC · JPL
717815	2017 BB_{25}	—	September 20, 2009	Kitt Peak	Spacewatch	·	2.1 km	MPC · JPL
717816	2017 BK_{27}	—	October 21, 2006	Mount Lemmon	Mount Lemmon Survey	HOF	2.1 km	MPC · JPL
717817	2017 BZ_{27}	—	February 8, 2008	Mount Lemmon	Mount Lemmon Survey	·	1.5 km	MPC · JPL
717818	2017 BM_{28}	—	January 27, 2011	Mount Lemmon	Mount Lemmon Survey	·	2.3 km	MPC · JPL
717819	2017 BN_{28}	—	August 31, 2014	Haleakala	Pan-STARRS 1	EOS	1.4 km	MPC · JPL
717820	2017 BB_{32}	—	June 17, 2007	Kitt Peak	Spacewatch	H	520 m	MPC · JPL
717821	2017 BK_{33}	—	May 31, 2008	Kitt Peak	Spacewatch	·	2.1 km	MPC · JPL
717822	2017 BL_{33}	—	November 22, 2008	Kitt Peak	Spacewatch	·	1.4 km	MPC · JPL
717823	2017 BE_{34}	—	January 22, 2006	Mount Lemmon	Mount Lemmon Survey	·	2.4 km	MPC · JPL
717824	2017 BG_{34}	—	March 2, 2008	Mount Lemmon	Mount Lemmon Survey	·	2.0 km	MPC · JPL
717825	2017 BH_{34}	—	July 25, 2015	Haleakala	Pan-STARRS 1	·	1.0 km	MPC · JPL
717826	2017 BS_{34}	—	November 3, 2015	Haleakala	Pan-STARRS 1	·	1.7 km	MPC · JPL
717827	2017 BR_{35}	—	October 1, 2011	Piszkéstető	K. Sárneczky	EUN	1.2 km	MPC · JPL
717828	2017 BA_{37}	—	May 26, 2014	Haleakala	Pan-STARRS 1	·	1.9 km	MPC · JPL
717829	2017 BP_{38}	—	January 3, 2012	Mount Lemmon	Mount Lemmon Survey	EOS	1.9 km	MPC · JPL
717830	2017 BD_{39}	—	September 6, 2008	Mount Lemmon	Mount Lemmon Survey	MAS	730 m	MPC · JPL
717831	2017 BP_{39}	—	September 26, 2006	Kitt Peak	Spacewatch	·	1.8 km	MPC · JPL
717832	2017 BH_{41}	—	October 20, 2003	Socorro	LINEAR	(5)	1.2 km	MPC · JPL
717833	2017 BM_{41}	—	March 24, 2009	Mount Lemmon	Mount Lemmon Survey	·	1.7 km	MPC · JPL
717834	2017 BW_{41}	—	November 3, 2014	Mount Lemmon	Mount Lemmon Survey	L5	8.1 km	MPC · JPL
717835	2017 BN_{42}	—	June 30, 2008	Kitt Peak	Spacewatch	·	3.2 km	MPC · JPL
717836	2017 BG_{43}	—	July 28, 2009	Kitt Peak	Spacewatch	·	1.9 km	MPC · JPL
717837	2017 BD_{45}	—	January 8, 2006	Catalina	CSS	·	2.9 km	MPC · JPL
717838	2017 BV_{45}	—	January 26, 2017	Mount Lemmon	Mount Lemmon Survey	·	1.1 km	MPC · JPL
717839	2017 BX_{46}	—	November 11, 2006	Kitt Peak	Spacewatch	·	1.6 km	MPC · JPL
717840	2017 BC_{47}	—	December 23, 2016	Haleakala	Pan-STARRS 1	·	1.8 km	MPC · JPL
717841	2017 BS_{47}	—	January 16, 2013	Haleakala	Pan-STARRS 1	·	1.2 km	MPC · JPL
717842	2017 BF_{48}	—	January 26, 2017	Mount Lemmon	Mount Lemmon Survey	·	1.5 km	MPC · JPL
717843	2017 BP_{48}	—	December 23, 2016	Haleakala	Pan-STARRS 1	·	1.9 km	MPC · JPL
717844	2017 BK_{49}	—	December 30, 2011	Mount Lemmon	Mount Lemmon Survey	·	1.7 km	MPC · JPL
717845	2017 BR_{49}	—	January 10, 2013	Mount Lemmon	Mount Lemmon Survey	·	1.6 km	MPC · JPL
717846	2017 BO_{50}	—	January 22, 2006	Mount Lemmon	Mount Lemmon Survey	·	1.9 km	MPC · JPL
717847	2017 BN_{51}	—	February 20, 2009	Catalina	CSS	·	1.0 km	MPC · JPL
717848	2017 BC_{53}	—	February 16, 2012	Haleakala	Pan-STARRS 1	EOS	1.6 km	MPC · JPL
717849	2017 BO_{53}	—	October 8, 2015	Catalina	CSS	·	2.2 km	MPC · JPL
717850	2017 BR_{53}	—	October 17, 2010	Mount Lemmon	Mount Lemmon Survey	·	1.2 km	MPC · JPL
717851	2017 BE_{54}	—	February 7, 2006	Kitt Peak	Spacewatch	TIR	2.2 km	MPC · JPL
717852	2017 BF_{54}	—	January 19, 2012	Mount Lemmon	Mount Lemmon Survey	EOS	1.5 km	MPC · JPL
717853	2017 BB_{55}	—	March 16, 2007	Kitt Peak	Spacewatch	·	1.9 km	MPC · JPL
717854	2017 BU_{55}	—	November 16, 2010	Mount Lemmon	Mount Lemmon Survey	·	1.7 km	MPC · JPL
717855	2017 BE_{56}	—	August 21, 2003	Campo Imperatore	CINEOS	·	2.8 km	MPC · JPL
717856	2017 BK_{56}	—	February 2, 2006	Mount Lemmon	Mount Lemmon Survey	·	2.5 km	MPC · JPL
717857	2017 BH_{57}	—	February 13, 2008	Kitt Peak	Spacewatch	AGN	900 m	MPC · JPL
717858	2017 BB_{58}	—	November 2, 2011	Mount Lemmon	Mount Lemmon Survey	·	1.8 km	MPC · JPL
717859	2017 BX_{60}	—	January 26, 2006	Mount Lemmon	Mount Lemmon Survey	·	2.7 km	MPC · JPL
717860	2017 BU_{61}	—	January 28, 2007	Mount Lemmon	Mount Lemmon Survey	·	1.5 km	MPC · JPL
717861	2017 BS_{62}	—	April 14, 2008	Kitt Peak	Spacewatch	EOS	1.8 km	MPC · JPL
717862	2017 BR_{63}	—	June 27, 2014	Haleakala	Pan-STARRS 1	·	1.7 km	MPC · JPL
717863	2017 BV_{63}	—	September 4, 2011	Haleakala	Pan-STARRS 1	·	1.2 km	MPC · JPL
717864	2017 BJ_{64}	—	February 26, 2012	Mayhill-ISON	L. Elenin	URS	3.7 km	MPC · JPL
717865	2017 BR_{66}	—	February 21, 2012	Mount Lemmon	Mount Lemmon Survey	VER	2.7 km	MPC · JPL
717866	2017 BS_{67}	—	October 22, 2006	Mount Lemmon	Mount Lemmon Survey	·	1.7 km	MPC · JPL
717867	2017 BH_{68}	—	February 24, 2006	Catalina	CSS	TIR	2.7 km	MPC · JPL
717868	2017 BS_{68}	—	December 15, 1999	Socorro	LINEAR	·	940 m	MPC · JPL
717869	2017 BG_{69}	—	February 21, 2012	Mount Lemmon	Mount Lemmon Survey	·	1.6 km	MPC · JPL
717870	2017 BS_{71}	—	January 27, 2017	Haleakala	Pan-STARRS 1	HOF	1.8 km	MPC · JPL
717871	2017 BZ_{71}	—	August 9, 2015	Haleakala	Pan-STARRS 1	AGN	1.0 km	MPC · JPL
717872	2017 BK_{78}	—	February 19, 2012	Kitt Peak	Spacewatch	EOS	1.6 km	MPC · JPL
717873	2017 BO_{78}	—	November 7, 2005	Mauna Kea	A. Boattini	THM	2.0 km	MPC · JPL
717874	2017 BC_{80}	—	September 23, 2015	Haleakala	Pan-STARRS 1	·	1.5 km	MPC · JPL
717875	2017 BD_{81}	—	February 8, 2008	Kitt Peak	Spacewatch	AGN	920 m	MPC · JPL
717876	2017 BG_{81}	—	February 9, 2008	Kitt Peak	Spacewatch	·	1.6 km	MPC · JPL
717877	2017 BA_{82}	—	October 23, 2006	Kitt Peak	Spacewatch	·	2.0 km	MPC · JPL
717878	2017 BT_{82}	—	February 11, 2000	Kitt Peak	Spacewatch	EUN	1.0 km	MPC · JPL
717879	2017 BS_{83}	—	September 17, 2004	Kitt Peak	Spacewatch	·	2.4 km	MPC · JPL
717880	2017 BP_{84}	—	December 2, 2010	Mount Lemmon	Mount Lemmon Survey	·	2.1 km	MPC · JPL
717881	2017 BC_{85}	—	December 25, 2010	Mount Lemmon	Mount Lemmon Survey	EOS	1.8 km	MPC · JPL
717882	2017 BD_{85}	—	March 1, 2008	Kitt Peak	Spacewatch	·	1.8 km	MPC · JPL
717883	2017 BF_{85}	—	January 2, 2017	Haleakala	Pan-STARRS 1	·	3.1 km	MPC · JPL
717884	2017 BF_{86}	—	July 4, 2014	Haleakala	Pan-STARRS 1	·	2.3 km	MPC · JPL
717885	2017 BK_{86}	—	July 15, 2013	Haleakala	Pan-STARRS 1	·	2.6 km	MPC · JPL
717886	2017 BW_{86}	—	October 15, 2015	Oukaïmeden	M. Ory	·	1.7 km	MPC · JPL
717887	2017 BH_{87}	—	October 30, 2010	Mount Lemmon	Mount Lemmon Survey	EOS	1.4 km	MPC · JPL
717888	2017 BZ_{88}	—	July 30, 2014	Haleakala	Pan-STARRS 1	·	2.2 km	MPC · JPL
717889	2017 BV_{95}	—	September 18, 2014	Haleakala	Pan-STARRS 1	·	2.6 km	MPC · JPL
717890	2017 BF_{96}	—	January 26, 2006	Mount Lemmon	Mount Lemmon Survey	·	2.5 km	MPC · JPL
717891	2017 BN_{96}	—	April 15, 2007	Kitt Peak	Spacewatch	·	2.5 km	MPC · JPL
717892	2017 BX_{96}	—	July 25, 2014	Haleakala	Pan-STARRS 1	·	1.8 km	MPC · JPL
717893	2017 BC_{97}	—	August 25, 2014	Haleakala	Pan-STARRS 1	·	2.3 km	MPC · JPL
717894	2017 BU_{97}	—	January 8, 2017	Mount Lemmon	Mount Lemmon Survey	L5	8.0 km	MPC · JPL
717895	2017 BP_{98}	—	December 29, 2005	Mount Lemmon	Mount Lemmon Survey	EOS	1.9 km	MPC · JPL
717896	2017 BR_{98}	—	August 24, 2011	La Sagra	OAM	·	1.3 km	MPC · JPL
717897	2017 BW_{98}	—	February 14, 2012	Haleakala	Pan-STARRS 1	·	1.7 km	MPC · JPL
717898	2017 BX_{99}	—	October 3, 2015	Mount Lemmon	Mount Lemmon Survey	·	1.5 km	MPC · JPL
717899	2017 BN_{101}	—	April 7, 2006	Kitt Peak	Spacewatch	·	2.5 km	MPC · JPL
717900	2017 BY_{101}	—	February 25, 2012	Kitt Peak	Spacewatch	·	1.8 km	MPC · JPL

== 717901–718000 ==
back to top

Designation			Discovery			Properties		Ref
Permanent	Provisional	Named after	Date	Site	Discoverer(s)	Category	Diam.	Ref
717901	2017 BJ_{104}	—	March 30, 2012	Kitt Peak	Spacewatch	·	2.7 km	MPC · JPL
717902	2017 BZ_{106}	—	November 3, 2010	Kitt Peak	Spacewatch	·	2.6 km	MPC · JPL
717903	2017 BH_{108}	—	February 8, 2011	Mount Lemmon	Mount Lemmon Survey	·	3.1 km	MPC · JPL
717904	2017 BH_{109}	—	March 13, 2013	Mount Lemmon	Mount Lemmon Survey	·	1.3 km	MPC · JPL
717905	2017 BO_{109}	—	December 30, 2005	Mount Lemmon	Mount Lemmon Survey	EUP	3.0 km	MPC · JPL
717906	2017 BS_{110}	—	December 13, 2010	Mount Lemmon	Mount Lemmon Survey	·	1.8 km	MPC · JPL
717907	2017 BK_{112}	—	September 23, 2015	Haleakala	Pan-STARRS 1	·	1.4 km	MPC · JPL
717908	2017 BM_{112}	—	December 2, 2010	Mount Lemmon	Mount Lemmon Survey	·	2.1 km	MPC · JPL
717909	2017 BQ_{116}	—	July 8, 2014	Haleakala	Pan-STARRS 1	·	2.3 km	MPC · JPL
717910	2017 BH_{117}	—	October 21, 2015	Haleakala	Pan-STARRS 1	T_{j} (2.98)	2.6 km	MPC · JPL
717911	2017 BV_{119}	—	April 7, 2002	Cerro Tololo	Deep Ecliptic Survey	EOS	1.3 km	MPC · JPL
717912	2017 BW_{120}	—	April 21, 2013	Mount Lemmon	Mount Lemmon Survey	·	2.2 km	MPC · JPL
717913	2017 BU_{121}	—	December 2, 2010	Mount Lemmon	Mount Lemmon Survey	·	1.9 km	MPC · JPL
717914	2017 BY_{121}	—	January 28, 2017	Haleakala	Pan-STARRS 1	HYG	2.1 km	MPC · JPL
717915	2017 BG_{122}	—	January 28, 2017	Haleakala	Pan-STARRS 1	·	2.3 km	MPC · JPL
717916	2017 BJ_{122}	—	October 27, 2009	Mount Lemmon	Mount Lemmon Survey	·	3.1 km	MPC · JPL
717917	2017 BX_{122}	—	April 1, 2012	Haleakala	Pan-STARRS 1	·	2.8 km	MPC · JPL
717918	2017 BZ_{122}	—	December 7, 2015	Haleakala	Pan-STARRS 1	·	2.0 km	MPC · JPL
717919	2017 BS_{123}	—	August 13, 2015	Haleakala	Pan-STARRS 1	·	1.8 km	MPC · JPL
717920	2017 BX_{123}	—	February 27, 2000	Kitt Peak	Spacewatch	ADE	1.9 km	MPC · JPL
717921	2017 BB_{124}	—	February 11, 2008	Kitt Peak	Spacewatch	·	1.7 km	MPC · JPL
717922	2017 BC_{124}	—	March 15, 2007	Mount Lemmon	Mount Lemmon Survey	·	2.3 km	MPC · JPL
717923	2017 BN_{124}	—	January 21, 2012	Catalina	CSS	·	1.7 km	MPC · JPL
717924	2017 BH_{125}	—	February 20, 2012	Haleakala	Pan-STARRS 1	·	3.5 km	MPC · JPL
717925	2017 BO_{125}	—	February 28, 2014	Haleakala	Pan-STARRS 1	·	560 m	MPC · JPL
717926	2017 BO_{126}	—	November 2, 2007	Catalina	CSS	·	1.6 km	MPC · JPL
717927	2017 BF_{127}	—	September 24, 2011	Catalina	CSS	·	1.6 km	MPC · JPL
717928	2017 BW_{127}	—	January 20, 2013	Kitt Peak	Spacewatch	RAF	650 m	MPC · JPL
717929	2017 BS_{131}	—	August 28, 2014	Haleakala	Pan-STARRS 1	·	1.5 km	MPC · JPL
717930	2017 BD_{132}	—	August 23, 2014	Haleakala	Pan-STARRS 1	·	1.5 km	MPC · JPL
717931	2017 BP_{132}	—	October 17, 2009	Mount Lemmon	Mount Lemmon Survey	·	2.0 km	MPC · JPL
717932	2017 BB_{133}	—	February 7, 2008	Mount Lemmon	Mount Lemmon Survey	AGN	990 m	MPC · JPL
717933	2017 BR_{133}	—	October 10, 2015	Oukaïmeden	M. Ory	·	1.5 km	MPC · JPL
717934	2017 BY_{136}	—	May 11, 2007	Mount Lemmon	Mount Lemmon Survey	·	2.6 km	MPC · JPL
717935	2017 BE_{137}	—	October 3, 2015	Mount Lemmon	Mount Lemmon Survey	·	2.1 km	MPC · JPL
717936	2017 BS_{137}	—	January 10, 2013	Haleakala	Pan-STARRS 1	·	1.1 km	MPC · JPL
717937	2017 BU_{137}	—	November 6, 2010	Kitt Peak	Spacewatch	KOR	1.3 km	MPC · JPL
717938	2017 BD_{138}	—	September 21, 2008	Kitt Peak	Spacewatch	·	1.2 km	MPC · JPL
717939	2017 BJ_{139}	—	August 28, 2014	Haleakala	Pan-STARRS 1	VER	2.2 km	MPC · JPL
717940	2017 BE_{140}	—	January 13, 2011	Kitt Peak	Spacewatch	·	2.4 km	MPC · JPL
717941	2017 BU_{140}	—	July 3, 2014	Haleakala	Pan-STARRS 1	·	2.0 km	MPC · JPL
717942	2017 BA_{141}	—	July 16, 2013	Haleakala	Pan-STARRS 1	·	1.9 km	MPC · JPL
717943	2017 BP_{141}	—	March 17, 2012	Mount Lemmon	Mount Lemmon Survey	·	2.3 km	MPC · JPL
717944	2017 BO_{144}	—	December 2, 2005	Mount Lemmon	Mount Lemmon Survey	·	2.0 km	MPC · JPL
717945	2017 BJ_{153}	—	January 30, 2017	Haleakala	Pan-STARRS 1	EOS	1.6 km	MPC · JPL
717946	2017 BG_{155}	—	July 28, 2008	Mount Lemmon	Mount Lemmon Survey	·	2.8 km	MPC · JPL
717947	2017 BK_{155}	—	December 2, 2010	Mount Lemmon	Mount Lemmon Survey	·	2.4 km	MPC · JPL
717948	2017 BS_{156}	—	January 26, 2017	Haleakala	Pan-STARRS 1	·	2.3 km	MPC · JPL
717949	2017 BD_{157}	—	January 27, 2017	Haleakala	Pan-STARRS 1	·	2.2 km	MPC · JPL
717950	2017 BL_{157}	—	January 28, 2017	Haleakala	Pan-STARRS 1	·	2.4 km	MPC · JPL
717951	2017 BR_{159}	—	August 2, 2011	Haleakala	Pan-STARRS 1	·	970 m	MPC · JPL
717952	2017 BV_{160}	—	January 30, 2017	Haleakala	Pan-STARRS 1	·	2.6 km	MPC · JPL
717953	2017 BH_{161}	—	January 16, 2017	Haleakala	Pan-STARRS 1	EOS	1.7 km	MPC · JPL
717954	2017 BZ_{164}	—	January 26, 2017	Haleakala	Pan-STARRS 1	·	1.5 km	MPC · JPL
717955	2017 BZ_{166}	—	January 19, 2017	Mount Lemmon	Mount Lemmon Survey	EOS	1.6 km	MPC · JPL
717956	2017 BO_{167}	—	January 28, 2017	Haleakala	Pan-STARRS 1	·	500 m	MPC · JPL
717957	2017 BQ_{172}	—	January 19, 2017	Mount Lemmon	Mount Lemmon Survey	·	2.8 km	MPC · JPL
717958	2017 BC_{178}	—	November 8, 2010	Mount Lemmon	Mount Lemmon Survey	·	1.6 km	MPC · JPL
717959	2017 BG_{184}	—	December 3, 2015	Haleakala	Pan-STARRS 1	EOS	1.5 km	MPC · JPL
717960	2017 BN_{184}	—	January 26, 2017	Mount Lemmon	Mount Lemmon Survey	·	2.2 km	MPC · JPL
717961	2017 BE_{187}	—	January 28, 2017	Haleakala	Pan-STARRS 1	·	2.0 km	MPC · JPL
717962	2017 BC_{189}	—	January 28, 2017	Haleakala	Pan-STARRS 1	·	740 m	MPC · JPL
717963	2017 BG_{191}	—	January 26, 2017	Mount Lemmon	Mount Lemmon Survey	·	2.7 km	MPC · JPL
717964	2017 BJ_{194}	—	January 26, 2017	Haleakala	Pan-STARRS 1	·	2.4 km	MPC · JPL
717965	2017 BK_{199}	—	January 31, 2017	Haleakala	Pan-STARRS 1	·	1.9 km	MPC · JPL
717966	2017 BY_{199}	—	January 26, 2017	Mount Lemmon	Mount Lemmon Survey	·	1.6 km	MPC · JPL
717967	2017 BR_{201}	—	January 26, 2017	Haleakala	Pan-STARRS 1	VER	1.8 km	MPC · JPL
717968	2017 BU_{207}	—	January 28, 2017	Haleakala	Pan-STARRS 1	·	840 m	MPC · JPL
717969	2017 BR_{209}	—	January 31, 2017	Haleakala	Pan-STARRS 1	·	2.3 km	MPC · JPL
717970	2017 BM_{212}	—	January 29, 2017	Haleakala	Pan-STARRS 1	EOS	1.4 km	MPC · JPL
717971	2017 BT_{215}	—	January 19, 2017	Mount Lemmon	Mount Lemmon Survey	·	1.9 km	MPC · JPL
717972	2017 BH_{216}	—	January 28, 2017	Haleakala	Pan-STARRS 1	(31811)	2.0 km	MPC · JPL
717973	2017 BQ_{216}	—	January 30, 2011	Haleakala	Pan-STARRS 1	·	2.2 km	MPC · JPL
717974	2017 BD_{222}	—	January 28, 2017	Haleakala	Pan-STARRS 1	·	2.4 km	MPC · JPL
717975	2017 BN_{222}	—	January 27, 2017	Haleakala	Pan-STARRS 1	·	2.3 km	MPC · JPL
717976	2017 BX_{223}	—	February 27, 2017	Haleakala	Pan-STARRS 1	·	1.7 km	MPC · JPL
717977	2017 BY_{238}	—	August 21, 2019	Mount Lemmon	Mount Lemmon Survey	·	1.9 km	MPC · JPL
717978	2017 CX_{2}	—	September 8, 2015	Haleakala	Pan-STARRS 1	EUN	1.1 km	MPC · JPL
717979	2017 CG_{3}	—	January 5, 2006	Mount Lemmon	Mount Lemmon Survey	EOS	1.8 km	MPC · JPL
717980	2017 CM_{3}	—	January 27, 2012	Mount Lemmon	Mount Lemmon Survey	BRA	1.4 km	MPC · JPL
717981	2017 CF_{4}	—	March 19, 2001	Kitt Peak	Spacewatch	·	2.5 km	MPC · JPL
717982	2017 CS_{5}	—	February 1, 2017	Mount Lemmon	Mount Lemmon Survey	·	1.8 km	MPC · JPL
717983	2017 CN_{6}	—	September 18, 2009	Kitt Peak	Spacewatch	·	2.6 km	MPC · JPL
717984	2017 CF_{7}	—	March 26, 2007	Kitt Peak	Spacewatch	·	1.5 km	MPC · JPL
717985	2017 CA_{8}	—	January 25, 2006	Kitt Peak	Spacewatch	TIR	2.6 km	MPC · JPL
717986	2017 CO_{9}	—	August 26, 2012	Haleakala	Pan-STARRS 1	·	610 m	MPC · JPL
717987	2017 CW_{9}	—	February 8, 2008	Kitt Peak	Spacewatch	AGN	970 m	MPC · JPL
717988	2017 CB_{10}	—	January 30, 2006	Kitt Peak	Spacewatch	·	2.5 km	MPC · JPL
717989	2017 CH_{10}	—	September 11, 2010	Mount Lemmon	Mount Lemmon Survey	·	1.6 km	MPC · JPL
717990	2017 CF_{13}	—	September 2, 2010	Mount Lemmon	Mount Lemmon Survey	·	1.7 km	MPC · JPL
717991	2017 CU_{14}	—	September 30, 2006	Mount Lemmon	Mount Lemmon Survey	·	1.6 km	MPC · JPL
717992	2017 CV_{15}	—	March 19, 2013	Haleakala	Pan-STARRS 1	·	1.7 km	MPC · JPL
717993	2017 CD_{17}	—	October 16, 2006	Catalina	CSS	·	1.8 km	MPC · JPL
717994	2017 CS_{17}	—	February 3, 2017	Mount Lemmon	Mount Lemmon Survey	AST	1.3 km	MPC · JPL
717995	2017 CU_{17}	—	September 28, 2006	Kitt Peak	Spacewatch	·	1.6 km	MPC · JPL
717996	2017 CV_{17}	—	August 16, 2009	Kitt Peak	Spacewatch	EOS	1.7 km	MPC · JPL
717997	2017 CB_{18}	—	September 23, 2015	Haleakala	Pan-STARRS 1	·	1.1 km	MPC · JPL
717998	2017 CE_{18}	—	February 26, 2014	Haleakala	Pan-STARRS 1	·	550 m	MPC · JPL
717999	2017 CK_{18}	—	February 28, 2012	Haleakala	Pan-STARRS 1	·	2.1 km	MPC · JPL
718000	2017 CG_{19}	—	December 27, 2011	Kitt Peak	Spacewatch	·	1.6 km	MPC · JPL

back to top
