= List of minor planets: 742001–743000 =

The following is a partial list of minor planets, running from minor-planet number 742001 through 743000, inclusive. The primary data for this and other partial lists is based on JPL's "Small-Body Orbital Elements" and data available from the Minor Planet Center. Critical list information is also provided by the MPC, unless otherwise specified from Lowell Observatory. A detailed description of the table's columns and additional sources are given on the main page including a complete list of every page in this series, and a statistical break-up on the dynamical classification of minor planets.

Also see the summary list of all named bodies in numerical and alphabetical order, and the corresponding naming citations for the number range of this particular list. New namings may only be added to this list after official publication, as the preannouncement of names is condemned by the Working Group for Small Bodies Nomenclature of the International Astronomical Union.

Near-Earth obj.	MBA (inner)	MBA (outer)	Centaur
Mars-crosser	MBA (middle)	Jupiter trojan	Trans-Neptunian obj.
Unclassified

== 742001–742100 ==
Designation			Discovery			Properties		Ref
Permanent	Provisional	Named after	Date	Site	Discoverer(s)	Category	Diam.	Ref
742001	2006 WD_{123}	—	November 19, 2006	Kitt Peak	Spacewatch	·	880 m	MPC · JPL
742002	2006 WL_{125}	—	November 22, 2006	Mount Lemmon	Mount Lemmon Survey	V	450 m	MPC · JPL
742003	2006 WA_{126}	—	November 22, 2006	Mount Lemmon	Mount Lemmon Survey	·	640 m	MPC · JPL
742004	2006 WT_{127}	—	November 18, 2006	Marly	Kocher, F.	·	1.7 km	MPC · JPL
742005	2006 WC_{133}	—	November 18, 2006	Kitt Peak	Spacewatch	·	1.8 km	MPC · JPL
742006	2006 WB_{134}	—	October 22, 2006	Palomar	NEAT	·	910 m	MPC · JPL
742007	2006 WT_{136}	—	September 27, 2006	Mount Lemmon	Mount Lemmon Survey	·	600 m	MPC · JPL
742008	2006 WY_{137}	—	October 28, 2006	Mount Lemmon	Mount Lemmon Survey	AEO	890 m	MPC · JPL
742009	2006 WE_{142}	—	November 20, 2006	Kitt Peak	Spacewatch	·	1.6 km	MPC · JPL
742010	2006 WS_{144}	—	November 20, 2006	Kitt Peak	Spacewatch	V	520 m	MPC · JPL
742011	2006 WH_{145}	—	November 20, 2006	Kitt Peak	Spacewatch	·	1.4 km	MPC · JPL
742012	2006 WU_{148}	—	November 20, 2006	Kitt Peak	Spacewatch	·	770 m	MPC · JPL
742013	2006 WS_{153}	—	November 21, 2006	Mount Lemmon	Mount Lemmon Survey	·	2.3 km	MPC · JPL
742014	2006 WF_{155}	—	November 22, 2006	Kitt Peak	Spacewatch	·	1.3 km	MPC · JPL
742015	2006 WF_{164}	—	November 23, 2006	Kitt Peak	Spacewatch	·	880 m	MPC · JPL
742016	2006 WW_{170}	—	November 23, 2006	Kitt Peak	Spacewatch	NYS	700 m	MPC · JPL
742017	2006 WC_{179}	—	November 24, 2006	Mount Lemmon	Mount Lemmon Survey	·	2.5 km	MPC · JPL
742018	2006 WE_{182}	—	November 19, 2006	Kitt Peak	Spacewatch	NYS	1.1 km	MPC · JPL
742019	2006 WT_{183}	—	November 15, 2006	Kitt Peak	Spacewatch	·	1.4 km	MPC · JPL
742020	2006 WA_{188}	—	November 24, 2006	Kitt Peak	Spacewatch	V	550 m	MPC · JPL
742021	2006 WW_{206}	—	September 19, 2006	Kitt Peak	Spacewatch	·	1.4 km	MPC · JPL
742022	2006 WL_{210}	—	March 11, 2011	Mount Lemmon	Mount Lemmon Survey	·	1.1 km	MPC · JPL
742023	2006 WY_{210}	—	November 20, 2006	Kitt Peak	Spacewatch	·	1.5 km	MPC · JPL
742024	2006 WZ_{211}	—	October 25, 2016	Haleakala	Pan-STARRS 1	·	2.3 km	MPC · JPL
742025	2006 WO_{212}	—	December 9, 2015	Haleakala	Pan-STARRS 1	·	1.4 km	MPC · JPL
742026	2006 WX_{212}	—	November 2, 2010	Mount Lemmon	Mount Lemmon Survey	·	780 m	MPC · JPL
742027	2006 WZ_{213}	—	October 20, 2006	Mount Lemmon	Mount Lemmon Survey	·	850 m	MPC · JPL
742028	2006 WL_{217}	—	January 20, 2014	Mount Lemmon	Mount Lemmon Survey	·	630 m	MPC · JPL
742029	2006 WM_{219}	—	November 19, 2006	Kitt Peak	Spacewatch	·	1.2 km	MPC · JPL
742030	2006 WH_{224}	—	September 12, 2015	Haleakala	Pan-STARRS 1	AGN	920 m	MPC · JPL
742031	2006 WS_{224}	—	October 2, 2013	Kitt Peak	Spacewatch	·	640 m	MPC · JPL
742032	2006 WF_{226}	—	September 25, 2016	Haleakala	Pan-STARRS 1	·	1.3 km	MPC · JPL
742033	2006 WB_{227}	—	November 23, 2006	Kitt Peak	Spacewatch	·	750 m	MPC · JPL
742034	2006 WJ_{230}	—	November 20, 2006	Kitt Peak	Spacewatch	MAS	550 m	MPC · JPL
742035	2006 WH_{236}	—	November 27, 2006	Mount Lemmon	Mount Lemmon Survey	·	780 m	MPC · JPL
742036	2006 XL_{5}	—	November 14, 2006	Mount Lemmon	Mount Lemmon Survey	T_{j} (2.84) · unusual	2.7 km	MPC · JPL
742037	2006 XN_{10}	—	December 9, 2006	Kitt Peak	Spacewatch	·	820 m	MPC · JPL
742038	2006 XP_{19}	—	December 1, 2006	Mount Lemmon	Mount Lemmon Survey	EUN	1.3 km	MPC · JPL
742039	2006 XC_{34}	—	December 11, 2006	Kitt Peak	Spacewatch	·	820 m	MPC · JPL
742040	2006 XK_{36}	—	November 27, 2006	Mount Lemmon	Mount Lemmon Survey	·	970 m	MPC · JPL
742041	2006 XM_{52}	—	November 27, 2006	Mount Lemmon	Mount Lemmon Survey	·	1.9 km	MPC · JPL
742042	2006 XE_{74}	—	December 13, 2006	Kitt Peak	Spacewatch	AEO	930 m	MPC · JPL
742043	2006 XX_{75}	—	December 13, 2006	Kitt Peak	Spacewatch	V	480 m	MPC · JPL
742044	2006 XL_{76}	—	December 14, 2006	Kitt Peak	Spacewatch	ERI	1.1 km	MPC · JPL
742045	2006 XO_{76}	—	October 17, 2010	Catalina	CSS	(1547)	1.2 km	MPC · JPL
742046	2006 XP_{77}	—	February 14, 2011	Piszkéstető	K. Sárneczky	·	700 m	MPC · JPL
742047	2006 XD_{79}	—	August 25, 2014	Haleakala	Pan-STARRS 1	·	1.6 km	MPC · JPL
742048	2006 XO_{81}	—	December 15, 2006	Kitt Peak	Spacewatch	H	490 m	MPC · JPL
742049	2006 XP_{81}	—	December 1, 2006	Mount Lemmon	Mount Lemmon Survey	·	1.9 km	MPC · JPL
742050	2006 YU_{20}	—	December 1, 2006	Kitt Peak	Spacewatch	·	1.1 km	MPC · JPL
742051	2006 YY_{23}	—	December 21, 2006	Kitt Peak	Spacewatch	·	2.6 km	MPC · JPL
742052	2006 YR_{29}	—	December 21, 2006	Kitt Peak	Spacewatch	·	850 m	MPC · JPL
742053	2006 YK_{33}	—	December 13, 2006	Kitt Peak	Spacewatch	·	570 m	MPC · JPL
742054	2006 YP_{36}	—	December 10, 2006	Kitt Peak	Spacewatch	·	1.6 km	MPC · JPL
742055	2006 YT_{44}	—	December 25, 2006	Piszkéstető	K. Sárneczky	·	1.7 km	MPC · JPL
742056	2006 YX_{56}	—	December 16, 2006	Mount Lemmon	Mount Lemmon Survey	NYS	860 m	MPC · JPL
742057	2006 YE_{57}	—	December 27, 2006	Mount Lemmon	Mount Lemmon Survey	·	620 m	MPC · JPL
742058	2006 YA_{58}	—	December 8, 2015	Haleakala	Pan-STARRS 1	·	2.0 km	MPC · JPL
742059	2006 YF_{59}	—	December 15, 2006	Kitt Peak	Spacewatch	NYS	820 m	MPC · JPL
742060	2006 YP_{59}	—	April 20, 2015	Haleakala	Pan-STARRS 1	·	2.9 km	MPC · JPL
742061	2006 YX_{60}	—	December 26, 2006	Kitt Peak	Spacewatch	H	400 m	MPC · JPL
742062	2006 YP_{61}	—	December 24, 2006	Kitt Peak	Spacewatch	·	790 m	MPC · JPL
742063	2006 YZ_{61}	—	December 24, 2006	Kitt Peak	Spacewatch	·	2.0 km	MPC · JPL
742064	2006 YQ_{62}	—	December 10, 2006	Kitt Peak	Spacewatch	·	1.9 km	MPC · JPL
742065	2006 YV_{65}	—	December 17, 2015	Mount Lemmon	Mount Lemmon Survey	·	1.7 km	MPC · JPL
742066	2006 YR_{67}	—	December 21, 2006	Kitt Peak	Spacewatch	NYS	850 m	MPC · JPL
742067	2007 AJ_{11}	—	January 14, 2007	Altschwendt	W. Ries	·	740 m	MPC · JPL
742068	2007 AD_{19}	—	January 15, 2007	Catalina	CSS	·	1.7 km	MPC · JPL
742069	2007 AM_{19}	—	January 9, 2007	Mount Lemmon	Mount Lemmon Survey	·	2.6 km	MPC · JPL
742070	2007 AS_{19}	—	January 10, 2007	Mount Lemmon	Mount Lemmon Survey	H	460 m	MPC · JPL
742071	2007 AY_{31}	—	January 9, 2007	Mount Lemmon	Mount Lemmon Survey	·	940 m	MPC · JPL
742072	2007 AA_{32}	—	January 10, 2007	Mount Lemmon	Mount Lemmon Survey	·	1.5 km	MPC · JPL
742073	2007 AN_{32}	—	January 10, 2007	Mount Lemmon	Mount Lemmon Survey	·	1.7 km	MPC · JPL
742074	2007 AT_{32}	—	September 19, 2014	Haleakala	Pan-STARRS 1	·	1.3 km	MPC · JPL
742075	2007 AB_{33}	—	January 10, 2007	Mount Lemmon	Mount Lemmon Survey	·	1.9 km	MPC · JPL
742076	2007 AL_{33}	—	January 15, 2007	Mauna Kea	P. A. Wiegert	·	530 m	MPC · JPL
742077	2007 AS_{33}	—	January 9, 2007	Mount Lemmon	Mount Lemmon Survey	MAS	590 m	MPC · JPL
742078	2007 AL_{34}	—	January 26, 2011	Kitt Peak	Spacewatch	·	890 m	MPC · JPL
742079	2007 AA_{35}	—	August 5, 2018	Haleakala	Pan-STARRS 1	·	1.5 km	MPC · JPL
742080	2007 AE_{36}	—	January 9, 2007	Mount Lemmon	Mount Lemmon Survey	·	1.8 km	MPC · JPL
742081	2007 AE_{37}	—	October 23, 2006	Kitt Peak	Spacewatch	·	1.7 km	MPC · JPL
742082	2007 AX_{37}	—	January 10, 2007	Mount Lemmon	Mount Lemmon Survey	·	950 m	MPC · JPL
742083	2007 AA_{38}	—	January 9, 2007	Kitt Peak	Spacewatch	·	1.8 km	MPC · JPL
742084	2007 BX_{23}	—	January 17, 2007	Kitt Peak	Spacewatch	·	910 m	MPC · JPL
742085	2007 BQ_{27}	—	January 9, 2007	Kitt Peak	Spacewatch	·	980 m	MPC · JPL
742086	2007 BY_{40}	—	January 9, 2007	Mount Lemmon	Mount Lemmon Survey	·	960 m	MPC · JPL
742087	2007 BU_{50}	—	January 24, 2007	Mount Lemmon	Mount Lemmon Survey	·	1.6 km	MPC · JPL
742088	2007 BF_{51}	—	January 24, 2007	Kitt Peak	Spacewatch	·	1.5 km	MPC · JPL
742089	2007 BQ_{53}	—	January 24, 2007	Kitt Peak	Spacewatch	·	720 m	MPC · JPL
742090	2007 BB_{59}	—	January 17, 2007	Kitt Peak	Spacewatch	·	1.5 km	MPC · JPL
742091	2007 BS_{81}	—	December 21, 2006	Kitt Peak	L. H. Wasserman, M. W. Buie	·	1.3 km	MPC · JPL
742092	2007 BE_{88}	—	January 19, 2007	Mauna Kea	P. A. Wiegert	·	950 m	MPC · JPL
742093	2007 BK_{91}	—	January 19, 2007	Mauna Kea	P. A. Wiegert	·	690 m	MPC · JPL
742094	2007 BE_{93}	—	January 19, 2007	Mauna Kea	P. A. Wiegert	·	580 m	MPC · JPL
742095	2007 BU_{101}	—	January 17, 2007	Catalina	CSS	·	1.8 km	MPC · JPL
742096	2007 BL_{103}	—	January 27, 2007	Kitt Peak	Spacewatch	NYS	890 m	MPC · JPL
742097	2007 BX_{103}	—	January 27, 2007	Mount Lemmon	Mount Lemmon Survey	·	900 m	MPC · JPL
742098	2007 BU_{104}	—	January 27, 2007	Kitt Peak	Spacewatch	·	2.0 km	MPC · JPL
742099	2007 BX_{104}	—	November 27, 2013	Haleakala	Pan-STARRS 1	·	1.1 km	MPC · JPL
742100	2007 BY_{105}	—	January 27, 2007	Mount Lemmon	Mount Lemmon Survey	MAS	470 m	MPC · JPL

== 742101–742200 ==
back to top

Designation			Discovery			Properties		Ref
Permanent	Provisional	Named after	Date	Site	Discoverer(s)	Category	Diam.	Ref
742101	2007 BN_{106}	—	January 28, 2007	Catalina	CSS	·	1.3 km	MPC · JPL
742102	2007 BL_{107}	—	January 10, 2007	Kitt Peak	Spacewatch	·	1.0 km	MPC · JPL
742103	2007 BM_{107}	—	March 14, 2012	Mount Lemmon	Mount Lemmon Survey	·	1.6 km	MPC · JPL
742104	2007 BN_{107}	—	December 12, 2014	Haleakala	Pan-STARRS 1	H	410 m	MPC · JPL
742105	2007 BE_{110}	—	January 27, 2007	Mount Lemmon	Mount Lemmon Survey	·	730 m	MPC · JPL
742106	2007 BL_{112}	—	March 10, 2011	Mount Lemmon	Mount Lemmon Survey	·	780 m	MPC · JPL
742107	2007 BB_{114}	—	January 27, 2007	Kitt Peak	Spacewatch	·	880 m	MPC · JPL
742108	2007 BR_{114}	—	January 17, 2007	Kitt Peak	Spacewatch	·	1.6 km	MPC · JPL
742109	2007 BK_{117}	—	January 17, 2007	Mount Lemmon	Mount Lemmon Survey	·	740 m	MPC · JPL
742110	2007 BM_{117}	—	January 27, 2007	Kitt Peak	Spacewatch	·	590 m	MPC · JPL
742111	2007 BD_{119}	—	January 17, 2007	Kitt Peak	Spacewatch	·	2.3 km	MPC · JPL
742112	2007 BD_{120}	—	January 17, 2007	Kitt Peak	Spacewatch	·	1.2 km	MPC · JPL
742113	2007 CS_{12}	—	December 21, 2006	Kitt Peak	L. H. Wasserman, M. W. Buie	·	1.0 km	MPC · JPL
742114	2007 CV_{19}	—	January 27, 2007	Kitt Peak	Spacewatch	·	1.9 km	MPC · JPL
742115	2007 CV_{29}	—	January 27, 2007	Kitt Peak	Spacewatch	·	820 m	MPC · JPL
742116	2007 CL_{58}	—	November 19, 2006	Catalina	CSS	·	1.6 km	MPC · JPL
742117	2007 CB_{84}	—	February 9, 2007	Catalina	CSS	·	940 m	MPC · JPL
742118	2007 DS_{5}	—	February 10, 1996	Kitt Peak	Spacewatch	MAS	560 m	MPC · JPL
742119	2007 DT_{12}	—	October 20, 2006	Kitt Peak	Deep Ecliptic Survey	ERI	1.4 km	MPC · JPL
742120	2007 DZ_{15}	—	February 17, 2007	Kitt Peak	Spacewatch	·	910 m	MPC · JPL
742121	2007 DC_{18}	—	December 27, 2006	Mount Lemmon	Mount Lemmon Survey	·	620 m	MPC · JPL
742122	2007 DQ_{22}	—	February 17, 2007	Kitt Peak	Spacewatch	·	870 m	MPC · JPL
742123	2007 DH_{29}	—	February 17, 2007	Kitt Peak	Spacewatch	·	670 m	MPC · JPL
742124	2007 DB_{32}	—	February 9, 2007	Kitt Peak	Spacewatch	·	1.2 km	MPC · JPL
742125	2007 DD_{57}	—	February 21, 2007	Mount Lemmon	Mount Lemmon Survey	·	650 m	MPC · JPL
742126	2007 DA_{74}	—	February 21, 2007	Kitt Peak	Spacewatch	L5	8.3 km	MPC · JPL
742127	2007 DR_{74}	—	February 21, 2007	Kitt Peak	Spacewatch	·	1.7 km	MPC · JPL
742128	2007 DM_{75}	—	February 21, 2007	Kitt Peak	Spacewatch	H	440 m	MPC · JPL
742129	2007 DL_{85}	—	February 21, 2007	Kitt Peak	Spacewatch	·	1.8 km	MPC · JPL
742130	2007 DX_{86}	—	January 29, 2007	Kitt Peak	Spacewatch	·	1.8 km	MPC · JPL
742131	2007 DH_{87}	—	February 8, 2007	Kitt Peak	Spacewatch	·	1.2 km	MPC · JPL
742132	2007 DD_{102}	—	January 27, 2007	Kitt Peak	Spacewatch	NYS	860 m	MPC · JPL
742133	2007 DE_{114}	—	February 9, 2014	Haleakala	Pan-STARRS 1	NYS	730 m	MPC · JPL
742134	2007 DJ_{114}	—	February 26, 2007	Mount Lemmon	Mount Lemmon Survey	·	1.6 km	MPC · JPL
742135	2007 DN_{114}	—	February 26, 2007	Mount Lemmon	Mount Lemmon Survey	·	1.1 km	MPC · JPL
742136	2007 DQ_{119}	—	January 28, 2007	Kitt Peak	Spacewatch	·	1.1 km	MPC · JPL
742137	2007 DN_{121}	—	February 23, 2007	Kitt Peak	Spacewatch	·	880 m	MPC · JPL
742138	2007 DB_{122}	—	February 25, 2007	Mount Lemmon	Mount Lemmon Survey	·	880 m	MPC · JPL
742139	2007 DR_{122}	—	February 21, 2007	Kitt Peak	Spacewatch	·	1.2 km	MPC · JPL
742140	2007 DU_{122}	—	February 16, 2007	Mount Lemmon	Mount Lemmon Survey	·	1.0 km	MPC · JPL
742141	2007 DV_{122}	—	February 21, 2007	Mount Lemmon	Mount Lemmon Survey	·	690 m	MPC · JPL
742142	2007 DZ_{123}	—	February 26, 2007	Mount Lemmon	Mount Lemmon Survey	·	1.0 km	MPC · JPL
742143	2007 DB_{124}	—	August 31, 2005	Kitt Peak	Spacewatch	·	2.2 km	MPC · JPL
742144	2007 DG_{125}	—	March 22, 2015	Mount Lemmon	Mount Lemmon Survey	·	910 m	MPC · JPL
742145	2007 DS_{128}	—	February 25, 2007	Mount Lemmon	Mount Lemmon Survey	NYS	1.2 km	MPC · JPL
742146	2007 DO_{131}	—	February 19, 2007	Mount Lemmon	Mount Lemmon Survey	·	940 m	MPC · JPL
742147	2007 DE_{133}	—	February 21, 2007	Mount Lemmon	Mount Lemmon Survey	MAS	530 m	MPC · JPL
742148	2007 ET	—	March 10, 2007	Catalina	CSS	·	590 m	MPC · JPL
742149	2007 EQ_{25}	—	March 10, 2007	Mount Lemmon	Mount Lemmon Survey	·	630 m	MPC · JPL
742150	2007 EG_{28}	—	February 27, 2007	Kitt Peak	Spacewatch	·	2.2 km	MPC · JPL
742151	2007 ES_{62}	—	February 26, 2007	Mount Lemmon	Mount Lemmon Survey	·	780 m	MPC · JPL
742152	2007 EA_{64}	—	March 10, 2007	Mount Lemmon	Mount Lemmon Survey	·	1.7 km	MPC · JPL
742153	2007 EM_{78}	—	March 10, 2007	Mount Lemmon	Mount Lemmon Survey	·	1.9 km	MPC · JPL
742154	2007 EJ_{83}	—	February 26, 2007	Mount Lemmon	Mount Lemmon Survey	NYS	870 m	MPC · JPL
742155	2007 ER_{87}	—	March 13, 2007	Kitt Peak	Spacewatch	·	1.7 km	MPC · JPL
742156	2007 EK_{116}	—	March 10, 2003	Campo Imperatore	CINEOS	·	980 m	MPC · JPL
742157	2007 ET_{118}	—	March 13, 2007	Mount Lemmon	Mount Lemmon Survey	·	920 m	MPC · JPL
742158	2007 EA_{119}	—	January 28, 2003	Haleakala	NEAT	·	1 km	MPC · JPL
742159	2007 EE_{121}	—	March 14, 2007	Mount Lemmon	Mount Lemmon Survey	·	790 m	MPC · JPL
742160	2007 EY_{126}	—	February 21, 2007	Bergisch Gladbach	W. Bickel	·	1.7 km	MPC · JPL
742161	2007 EW_{151}	—	March 12, 2007	Mount Lemmon	Mount Lemmon Survey	NYS	840 m	MPC · JPL
742162	2007 EY_{154}	—	March 12, 2007	Kitt Peak	Spacewatch	·	680 m	MPC · JPL
742163	2007 EJ_{158}	—	January 28, 2007	Mount Lemmon	Mount Lemmon Survey	NYS	950 m	MPC · JPL
742164	2007 EE_{163}	—	March 15, 2007	Mount Lemmon	Mount Lemmon Survey	·	1.7 km	MPC · JPL
742165	2007 EL_{164}	—	March 15, 2007	Mount Lemmon	Mount Lemmon Survey	·	930 m	MPC · JPL
742166	2007 EB_{185}	—	March 14, 2007	Mount Lemmon	Mount Lemmon Survey	·	1 km	MPC · JPL
742167	2007 EE_{190}	—	February 19, 2007	Mount Lemmon	Mount Lemmon Survey	·	580 m	MPC · JPL
742168	2007 EK_{190}	—	April 25, 2003	Apache Point	SDSS	·	1.7 km	MPC · JPL
742169	2007 EV_{198}	—	March 10, 2007	Catalina	CSS	H	560 m	MPC · JPL
742170	2007 EO_{204}	—	March 11, 2007	Kitt Peak	Spacewatch	H	410 m	MPC · JPL
742171	2007 EC_{206}	—	March 12, 2007	Mount Lemmon	Mount Lemmon Survey	·	1.5 km	MPC · JPL
742172	2007 EU_{212}	—	March 14, 2007	Mount Lemmon	Mount Lemmon Survey	·	2.8 km	MPC · JPL
742173	2007 ER_{223}	—	March 11, 2007	Kitt Peak	Spacewatch	·	2.1 km	MPC · JPL
742174	2007 EP_{229}	—	March 11, 2007	Mount Lemmon	Mount Lemmon Survey	·	810 m	MPC · JPL
742175	2007 ED_{230}	—	March 15, 2007	Kitt Peak	Spacewatch	·	1.7 km	MPC · JPL
742176	2007 EJ_{232}	—	September 21, 2009	Mount Lemmon	Mount Lemmon Survey	NYS	960 m	MPC · JPL
742177	2007 ER_{232}	—	July 29, 2008	Kitt Peak	Spacewatch	·	1.4 km	MPC · JPL
742178	2007 ES_{232}	—	August 10, 2012	Kitt Peak	Spacewatch	L5	7.8 km	MPC · JPL
742179	2007 EA_{234}	—	April 22, 2011	Kitt Peak	Spacewatch	·	1 km	MPC · JPL
742180	2007 EG_{235}	—	March 11, 2016	Haleakala	Pan-STARRS 1	·	1.4 km	MPC · JPL
742181	2007 EW_{235}	—	March 15, 2007	Kitt Peak	Spacewatch	·	540 m	MPC · JPL
742182	2007 EC_{236}	—	March 13, 2007	Mount Lemmon	Mount Lemmon Survey	·	970 m	MPC · JPL
742183	2007 EB_{243}	—	March 10, 2007	Mount Lemmon	Mount Lemmon Survey	·	870 m	MPC · JPL
742184	2007 FU_{3}	—	February 21, 2007	Socorro	LINEAR	·	950 m	MPC · JPL
742185	2007 FJ_{4}	—	March 18, 2007	Mount Nyukasa	Japan Aerospace Exploration Agency	·	1.9 km	MPC · JPL
742186	2007 FO_{13}	—	March 19, 2007	Mount Lemmon	Mount Lemmon Survey	·	1.1 km	MPC · JPL
742187	2007 FN_{18}	—	March 20, 2007	Mount Lemmon	Mount Lemmon Survey	·	950 m	MPC · JPL
742188	2007 FJ_{36}	—	March 9, 2007	Mount Lemmon	Mount Lemmon Survey	·	490 m	MPC · JPL
742189	2007 FG_{50}	—	March 18, 2007	Kitt Peak	Spacewatch	NYS	940 m	MPC · JPL
742190	2007 FM_{50}	—	March 9, 2007	Kitt Peak	Spacewatch	NYS	1.0 km	MPC · JPL
742191	2007 FM_{52}	—	March 16, 2007	Mount Lemmon	Mount Lemmon Survey	NYS	770 m	MPC · JPL
742192	2007 FP_{52}	—	March 19, 2007	Mount Lemmon	Mount Lemmon Survey	·	900 m	MPC · JPL
742193	2007 FO_{54}	—	December 31, 2013	Kitt Peak	Spacewatch	·	1.1 km	MPC · JPL
742194	2007 FW_{54}	—	July 25, 2011	Haleakala	Pan-STARRS 1	·	870 m	MPC · JPL
742195	2007 FZ_{54}	—	March 19, 2007	Mount Lemmon	Mount Lemmon Survey	V	600 m	MPC · JPL
742196	2007 FY_{55}	—	March 23, 2012	Mount Lemmon	Mount Lemmon Survey	·	1.6 km	MPC · JPL
742197	2007 FJ_{57}	—	March 25, 2007	Mount Lemmon	Mount Lemmon Survey	·	1.8 km	MPC · JPL
742198	2007 FK_{59}	—	September 19, 2009	Kitt Peak	Spacewatch	·	780 m	MPC · JPL
742199	2007 FW_{61}	—	March 16, 2007	Mount Lemmon	Mount Lemmon Survey	·	1.5 km	MPC · JPL
742200	2007 GK_{9}	—	March 26, 2007	Mount Lemmon	Mount Lemmon Survey	·	1.0 km	MPC · JPL

== 742201–742300 ==
back to top

Designation			Discovery			Properties		Ref
Permanent	Provisional	Named after	Date	Site	Discoverer(s)	Category	Diam.	Ref
742201	2007 GN_{30}	—	March 11, 2003	Kitt Peak	Spacewatch	NYS	910 m	MPC · JPL
742202	2007 GT_{42}	—	October 24, 2005	Kitt Peak	Spacewatch	·	950 m	MPC · JPL
742203	2007 GE_{65}	—	April 15, 2007	Kitt Peak	Spacewatch	PHO	750 m	MPC · JPL
742204	2007 GJ_{79}	—	April 13, 2011	Mount Lemmon	Mount Lemmon Survey	·	990 m	MPC · JPL
742205	2007 GJ_{80}	—	November 9, 2013	Haleakala	Pan-STARRS 1	MAS	510 m	MPC · JPL
742206	2007 HF_{28}	—	April 18, 2007	Mount Lemmon	Mount Lemmon Survey	·	880 m	MPC · JPL
742207	2007 HR_{38}	—	March 9, 2007	Kitt Peak	Spacewatch	·	2.2 km	MPC · JPL
742208	2007 HS_{40}	—	April 20, 2007	Kitt Peak	Spacewatch	·	2.6 km	MPC · JPL
742209	2007 HG_{58}	—	April 23, 2007	Mount Lemmon	Mount Lemmon Survey	·	1.5 km	MPC · JPL
742210	2007 HS_{70}	—	April 11, 2007	Mount Lemmon	Mount Lemmon Survey	·	1.8 km	MPC · JPL
742211	2007 HX_{71}	—	November 6, 2005	Mount Lemmon	Mount Lemmon Survey	MAS	540 m	MPC · JPL
742212	2007 HY_{73}	—	April 22, 2007	Catalina	CSS	·	2.7 km	MPC · JPL
742213	2007 HC_{79}	—	March 25, 2007	Mount Lemmon	Mount Lemmon Survey	·	780 m	MPC · JPL
742214	2007 HF_{83}	—	April 15, 2007	Kitt Peak	Spacewatch	·	1.5 km	MPC · JPL
742215	2007 HD_{101}	—	October 3, 2013	Mount Lemmon	Mount Lemmon Survey	·	1.5 km	MPC · JPL
742216	2007 HF_{101}	—	April 26, 2007	Kitt Peak	Spacewatch	·	1.4 km	MPC · JPL
742217	2007 HZ_{101}	—	January 22, 2015	Haleakala	Pan-STARRS 1	T_{j} (2.99) · 3:2	4.5 km	MPC · JPL
742218	2007 HE_{102}	—	April 22, 2007	Kitt Peak	Spacewatch	·	860 m	MPC · JPL
742219	2007 HN_{102}	—	April 25, 2007	Kitt Peak	Spacewatch	EOS	1.5 km	MPC · JPL
742220	2007 HN_{104}	—	September 4, 2008	Kitt Peak	Spacewatch	V	610 m	MPC · JPL
742221	2007 HV_{105}	—	March 19, 2017	Mount Lemmon	Mount Lemmon Survey	EOS	1.4 km	MPC · JPL
742222	2007 HU_{108}	—	January 28, 2014	Mount Lemmon	Mount Lemmon Survey	·	960 m	MPC · JPL
742223	2007 HH_{109}	—	April 16, 2007	Catalina	CSS	NYS	1.1 km	MPC · JPL
742224	2007 HM_{109}	—	October 24, 2014	Mount Lemmon	Mount Lemmon Survey	·	1.5 km	MPC · JPL
742225	2007 HF_{110}	—	April 22, 2007	Mount Lemmon	Mount Lemmon Survey	·	1.6 km	MPC · JPL
742226	2007 HX_{111}	—	April 20, 2007	Kitt Peak	Spacewatch	·	490 m	MPC · JPL
742227	2007 HP_{112}	—	April 24, 2007	Kitt Peak	Spacewatch	·	790 m	MPC · JPL
742228	2007 HL_{115}	—	April 22, 2007	Kitt Peak	Spacewatch	·	500 m	MPC · JPL
742229	2007 JY_{16}	—	May 7, 2007	Kitt Peak	Spacewatch	·	2.5 km	MPC · JPL
742230	2007 JH_{19}	—	May 10, 2007	Kitt Peak	Spacewatch	3:2	3.9 km	MPC · JPL
742231	2007 JX_{29}	—	May 11, 2007	Mount Lemmon	Mount Lemmon Survey	·	880 m	MPC · JPL
742232	2007 JP_{32}	—	May 12, 2007	Mount Lemmon	Mount Lemmon Survey	·	2.7 km	MPC · JPL
742233	2007 JB_{39}	—	May 13, 2007	Mount Lemmon	Mount Lemmon Survey	·	780 m	MPC · JPL
742234	2007 JW_{39}	—	May 13, 2007	Siding Spring	SSS	·	2.4 km	MPC · JPL
742235	2007 JD_{42}	—	April 11, 2007	Catalina	CSS	·	2.8 km	MPC · JPL
742236	2007 JL_{42}	—	March 13, 2007	Catalina	CSS	·	1.6 km	MPC · JPL
742237	2007 JZ_{47}	—	May 13, 2007	Mount Lemmon	Mount Lemmon Survey	H	480 m	MPC · JPL
742238	2007 JL_{49}	—	March 21, 2017	Haleakala	Pan-STARRS 1	EOS	1.4 km	MPC · JPL
742239	2007 JO_{49}	—	May 11, 2007	Mount Lemmon	Mount Lemmon Survey	·	800 m	MPC · JPL
742240	2007 KF_{2}	—	May 18, 2007	Charleston	R. Holmes	L5	8.1 km	MPC · JPL
742241	2007 KV_{8}	—	May 15, 2007	Mount Lemmon	Mount Lemmon Survey	·	2.0 km	MPC · JPL
742242	2007 KO_{10}	—	January 28, 2017	Haleakala	Pan-STARRS 1	H	460 m	MPC · JPL
742243	2007 KD_{11}	—	January 25, 2014	Haleakala	Pan-STARRS 1	·	900 m	MPC · JPL
742244	2007 LZ	—	June 8, 2007	Piszkéstető	K. Sárneczky	·	1.4 km	MPC · JPL
742245	2007 LW_{9}	—	June 9, 2007	Kitt Peak	Spacewatch	PHO	920 m	MPC · JPL
742246	2007 LK_{10}	—	June 9, 2007	Kitt Peak	Spacewatch	H	430 m	MPC · JPL
742247	2007 LR_{15}	—	May 11, 2007	Mount Lemmon	Mount Lemmon Survey	·	1.5 km	MPC · JPL
742248	2007 LG_{20}	—	November 6, 2010	Mount Lemmon	Mount Lemmon Survey	·	1.6 km	MPC · JPL
742249	2007 LH_{35}	—	June 9, 2007	Kitt Peak	Spacewatch	·	890 m	MPC · JPL
742250	2007 LE_{39}	—	April 1, 2012	Mount Lemmon	Mount Lemmon Survey	TIR	1.8 km	MPC · JPL
742251	2007 MV_{3}	—	May 13, 2007	Mount Lemmon	Mount Lemmon Survey	H	530 m	MPC · JPL
742252	2007 MY_{8}	—	June 19, 2007	Kitt Peak	Spacewatch	MAR	760 m	MPC · JPL
742253	2007 MU_{18}	—	June 21, 2007	Mount Lemmon	Mount Lemmon Survey	3:2	5.1 km	MPC · JPL
742254	2007 MJ_{30}	—	August 28, 2013	Catalina	CSS	TIR	2.2 km	MPC · JPL
742255	2007 OR_{1}	—	July 19, 2007	Črni Vrh	Skvarč, J.	·	1.9 km	MPC · JPL
742256	2007 ON_{2}	—	July 20, 2007	Tiki	Teamo, N., S. F. Hönig	·	1.5 km	MPC · JPL
742257	2007 OD_{12}	—	July 24, 2007	Lulin	LUSS	·	1.3 km	MPC · JPL
742258	2007 PE_{11}	—	October 17, 2003	Kitt Peak	Spacewatch	·	900 m	MPC · JPL
742259	2007 PT_{43}	—	August 12, 2007	Socorro	LINEAR	·	1.6 km	MPC · JPL
742260	2007 PB_{44}	—	August 13, 2007	Socorro	LINEAR	·	1.3 km	MPC · JPL
742261	2007 PM_{47}	—	August 10, 2007	Kitt Peak	Spacewatch	·	1.5 km	MPC · JPL
742262	2007 PO_{49}	—	August 10, 2007	Kitt Peak	Spacewatch	EOS	1.4 km	MPC · JPL
742263	2007 QD_{3}	—	August 12, 2007	Socorro	LINEAR	·	2.2 km	MPC · JPL
742264	2007 QQ_{3}	—	July 9, 2007	Lulin	LUSS	·	1.6 km	MPC · JPL
742265	2007 QY_{13}	—	August 24, 2007	Kitt Peak	Spacewatch	VER	1.9 km	MPC · JPL
742266	2007 QO_{18}	—	August 23, 2007	Kitt Peak	Spacewatch	·	880 m	MPC · JPL
742267	2007 QP_{19}	—	August 24, 2007	Pla D'Arguines	R. Ferrando, Ferrando, M.	·	2.5 km	MPC · JPL
742268	2007 QU_{19}	—	August 24, 2007	Kitt Peak	Spacewatch	·	1.2 km	MPC · JPL
742269	2007 RQ_{3}	—	September 3, 2007	Mount Lemmon	Mount Lemmon Survey	·	2.2 km	MPC · JPL
742270	2007 RY_{5}	—	September 5, 2007	Dauban	C. Rinner, Kugel, F.	THB	2.5 km	MPC · JPL
742271	2007 RS_{14}	—	September 11, 2007	Dauban	C. Rinner, F. Kugel	·	890 m	MPC · JPL
742272	2007 RA_{16}	—	September 12, 2007	Schärding	Gierlinger, R.	·	2.1 km	MPC · JPL
742273	2007 RO_{20}	—	August 21, 2007	Anderson Mesa	LONEOS	·	1.2 km	MPC · JPL
742274	2007 RH_{25}	—	September 4, 2007	Mount Lemmon	Mount Lemmon Survey	EOS	1.5 km	MPC · JPL
742275	2007 RH_{31}	—	September 5, 2007	Catalina	CSS	·	570 m	MPC · JPL
742276	2007 RV_{33}	—	September 5, 2007	Mount Lemmon	Mount Lemmon Survey	·	1.2 km	MPC · JPL
742277	2007 RM_{36}	—	September 8, 2007	Anderson Mesa	LONEOS	·	1.8 km	MPC · JPL
742278	2007 RY_{41}	—	September 3, 2007	Catalina	CSS	·	670 m	MPC · JPL
742279	2007 RF_{43}	—	September 9, 2007	Kitt Peak	Spacewatch	·	2.7 km	MPC · JPL
742280	2007 RY_{43}	—	March 3, 2000	Kitt Peak	Spacewatch	·	2.6 km	MPC · JPL
742281	2007 RY_{51}	—	September 9, 2007	Kitt Peak	Spacewatch	URS	2.4 km	MPC · JPL
742282	2007 RP_{55}	—	September 9, 2007	Kitt Peak	Spacewatch	·	640 m	MPC · JPL
742283	2007 RE_{60}	—	August 23, 2007	Kitt Peak	Spacewatch	·	1.0 km	MPC · JPL
742284	2007 RG_{69}	—	September 10, 2007	Kitt Peak	Spacewatch	EOS	1.7 km	MPC · JPL
742285	2007 RW_{70}	—	September 10, 2007	Kitt Peak	Spacewatch	3:2	3.9 km	MPC · JPL
742286	2007 RU_{85}	—	September 10, 2007	Mount Lemmon	Mount Lemmon Survey	·	2.1 km	MPC · JPL
742287	2007 RZ_{86}	—	September 10, 2007	Mount Lemmon	Mount Lemmon Survey	·	520 m	MPC · JPL
742288	2007 RJ_{90}	—	September 10, 2007	Mount Lemmon	Mount Lemmon Survey	·	2.2 km	MPC · JPL
742289	2007 RP_{90}	—	September 10, 2007	Mount Lemmon	Mount Lemmon Survey	EOS	1.5 km	MPC · JPL
742290	2007 RY_{98}	—	September 10, 2007	Kitt Peak	Spacewatch	·	1.3 km	MPC · JPL
742291	2007 RQ_{111}	—	September 11, 2007	Kitt Peak	Spacewatch	·	1.9 km	MPC · JPL
742292	2007 RK_{112}	—	September 11, 2007	Mount Lemmon	Mount Lemmon Survey	·	620 m	MPC · JPL
742293	2007 RQ_{116}	—	September 11, 2007	Kitt Peak	Spacewatch	(5)	760 m	MPC · JPL
742294	2007 RY_{119}	—	September 11, 2007	XuYi	PMO NEO Survey Program	·	920 m	MPC · JPL
742295	2007 RF_{126}	—	September 12, 2007	Mount Lemmon	Mount Lemmon Survey	·	970 m	MPC · JPL
742296	2007 RM_{126}	—	September 12, 2007	Mount Lemmon	Mount Lemmon Survey	·	460 m	MPC · JPL
742297	2007 RK_{128}	—	September 12, 2007	Mount Lemmon	Mount Lemmon Survey	·	1.6 km	MPC · JPL
742298	2007 RY_{128}	—	September 12, 2007	Mount Lemmon	Mount Lemmon Survey	·	520 m	MPC · JPL
742299	2007 RB_{138}	—	November 19, 2003	Kitt Peak	Spacewatch	·	1.2 km	MPC · JPL
742300	2007 RL_{144}	—	September 14, 2007	Anderson Mesa	LONEOS	·	2.2 km	MPC · JPL

== 742301–742400 ==
back to top

Designation			Discovery			Properties		Ref
Permanent	Provisional	Named after	Date	Site	Discoverer(s)	Category	Diam.	Ref
742301	2007 RB_{147}	—	September 11, 2007	XuYi	PMO NEO Survey Program	(1547)	1.4 km	MPC · JPL
742302	2007 RG_{154}	—	August 13, 2007	XuYi	PMO NEO Survey Program	·	620 m	MPC · JPL
742303	2007 RA_{157}	—	September 11, 2007	Mount Lemmon	Mount Lemmon Survey	·	930 m	MPC · JPL
742304	2007 RJ_{161}	—	September 13, 2007	Anderson Mesa	LONEOS	·	610 m	MPC · JPL
742305	2007 RM_{161}	—	September 13, 2007	Mount Lemmon	Mount Lemmon Survey	·	770 m	MPC · JPL
742306	2007 RV_{165}	—	September 10, 2007	Kitt Peak	Spacewatch	HYG	1.9 km	MPC · JPL
742307	2007 RR_{167}	—	September 10, 2007	Kitt Peak	Spacewatch	EOS	1.5 km	MPC · JPL
742308	2007 RE_{174}	—	September 10, 2007	Kitt Peak	Spacewatch	·	2.3 km	MPC · JPL
742309	2007 RB_{175}	—	September 10, 2007	Kitt Peak	Spacewatch	·	540 m	MPC · JPL
742310	2007 RN_{183}	—	September 12, 2007	Mount Lemmon	Mount Lemmon Survey	·	1.2 km	MPC · JPL
742311	2007 RB_{184}	—	September 13, 2007	Mount Lemmon	Mount Lemmon Survey	·	2.4 km	MPC · JPL
742312	2007 RT_{187}	—	September 10, 2007	Catalina	CSS	JUN	720 m	MPC · JPL
742313	2007 RL_{190}	—	September 11, 2007	Kitt Peak	Spacewatch	·	1.1 km	MPC · JPL
742314	2007 RC_{194}	—	September 12, 2007	Kitt Peak	Spacewatch	HNS	810 m	MPC · JPL
742315	2007 RK_{200}	—	September 13, 2007	Kitt Peak	Spacewatch	·	2.4 km	MPC · JPL
742316	2007 RZ_{200}	—	September 13, 2007	Kitt Peak	Spacewatch	·	740 m	MPC · JPL
742317	2007 RO_{203}	—	September 9, 2007	Mount Lemmon	Mount Lemmon Survey	·	520 m	MPC · JPL
742318	2007 RQ_{205}	—	September 9, 2007	Kitt Peak	Spacewatch	·	1.1 km	MPC · JPL
742319	2007 RQ_{207}	—	September 10, 2007	Kitt Peak	Spacewatch	(5)	1.1 km	MPC · JPL
742320	2007 RQ_{216}	—	September 13, 2007	Catalina	CSS	·	490 m	MPC · JPL
742321	2007 RS_{216}	—	September 13, 2007	Catalina	CSS	·	1.3 km	MPC · JPL
742322	2007 RD_{222}	—	September 14, 2007	Mount Lemmon	Mount Lemmon Survey	NYS	1.1 km	MPC · JPL
742323	2007 RQ_{222}	—	September 14, 2007	Mount Lemmon	Mount Lemmon Survey	·	1.2 km	MPC · JPL
742324	2007 RF_{232}	—	September 11, 2007	Mount Lemmon	Mount Lemmon Survey	·	680 m	MPC · JPL
742325	2007 RN_{234}	—	August 10, 2007	Kitt Peak	Spacewatch	·	1.3 km	MPC · JPL
742326	2007 RE_{236}	—	August 16, 2007	XuYi	PMO NEO Survey Program	·	1.5 km	MPC · JPL
742327	2007 RH_{240}	—	September 9, 2007	Anderson Mesa	LONEOS	·	1.0 km	MPC · JPL
742328	2007 RU_{244}	—	September 11, 2007	Kitt Peak	Spacewatch	·	520 m	MPC · JPL
742329	2007 RX_{244}	—	September 11, 2007	Kitt Peak	Spacewatch	·	780 m	MPC · JPL
742330	2007 RG_{246}	—	September 12, 2007	Mount Lemmon	Mount Lemmon Survey	TIR	2.8 km	MPC · JPL
742331	2007 RW_{246}	—	September 3, 2007	Catalina	CSS	(1547)	1.4 km	MPC · JPL
742332	2007 RJ_{247}	—	September 27, 2003	Kitt Peak	Spacewatch	·	910 m	MPC · JPL
742333	2007 RE_{248}	—	September 13, 2007	Mount Lemmon	Mount Lemmon Survey	·	930 m	MPC · JPL
742334	2007 RO_{254}	—	September 14, 2007	Mount Lemmon	Mount Lemmon Survey	·	570 m	MPC · JPL
742335	2007 RW_{254}	—	September 10, 2007	Kitt Peak	Spacewatch	·	1.1 km	MPC · JPL
742336	2007 RJ_{256}	—	September 5, 2007	Lulin	LUSS	·	1.1 km	MPC · JPL
742337	2007 RR_{258}	—	September 12, 1994	Kitt Peak	Spacewatch	·	1.1 km	MPC · JPL
742338	2007 RY_{259}	—	September 14, 2007	Kitt Peak	Spacewatch	·	1.3 km	MPC · JPL
742339	2007 RD_{260}	—	September 14, 2007	Kitt Peak	Spacewatch	·	2.1 km	MPC · JPL
742340	2007 RK_{261}	—	September 14, 2007	Kitt Peak	Spacewatch	·	1.8 km	MPC · JPL
742341	2007 RP_{263}	—	September 15, 2007	Mount Lemmon	Mount Lemmon Survey	EOS	1.5 km	MPC · JPL
742342	2007 RP_{279}	—	September 6, 2007	Siding Spring	SSS	·	1.2 km	MPC · JPL
742343	2007 RS_{289}	—	September 13, 2007	Mount Lemmon	Mount Lemmon Survey	·	1.2 km	MPC · JPL
742344	2007 RG_{294}	—	September 13, 2007	Kitt Peak	Spacewatch	3:2	3.5 km	MPC · JPL
742345	2007 RO_{295}	—	September 14, 2007	Mount Lemmon	Mount Lemmon Survey	NYS	810 m	MPC · JPL
742346	2007 RB_{302}	—	September 14, 2007	Andrushivka	Y. Ivaščenko	·	2.5 km	MPC · JPL
742347	2007 RT_{313}	—	September 12, 2007	Catalina	CSS	THB	2.2 km	MPC · JPL
742348	2007 RD_{317}	—	September 10, 2007	Kitt Peak	Spacewatch	MIS	2.1 km	MPC · JPL
742349	2007 RU_{318}	—	September 11, 2007	Mount Lemmon	Mount Lemmon Survey	·	2.1 km	MPC · JPL
742350	2007 RQ_{323}	—	September 10, 2007	Mount Lemmon	Mount Lemmon Survey	·	2.9 km	MPC · JPL
742351	2007 RW_{325}	—	September 12, 2007	Catalina	CSS	·	1.0 km	MPC · JPL
742352	2007 RU_{327}	—	September 12, 2007	Mount Lemmon	Mount Lemmon Survey	·	2.3 km	MPC · JPL
742353	2007 RG_{328}	—	September 10, 2007	Kitt Peak	Spacewatch	·	2.9 km	MPC · JPL
742354	2007 RN_{330}	—	September 11, 2007	Mount Lemmon	Mount Lemmon Survey	·	2.5 km	MPC · JPL
742355	2007 RS_{331}	—	September 13, 2007	Mount Lemmon	Mount Lemmon Survey	·	520 m	MPC · JPL
742356	2007 RS_{332}	—	September 14, 2007	Mount Lemmon	Mount Lemmon Survey	·	1.6 km	MPC · JPL
742357	2007 RM_{333}	—	September 10, 2007	Kitt Peak	Spacewatch	·	1.2 km	MPC · JPL
742358	2007 RQ_{333}	—	April 14, 2011	Mount Lemmon	Mount Lemmon Survey	·	2.5 km	MPC · JPL
742359	2007 RA_{334}	—	September 14, 2007	Mount Lemmon	Mount Lemmon Survey	·	860 m	MPC · JPL
742360	2007 RZ_{335}	—	August 24, 2007	Kitt Peak	Spacewatch	·	1.3 km	MPC · JPL
742361	2007 RM_{337}	—	January 27, 2015	Haleakala	Pan-STARRS 1	·	2.6 km	MPC · JPL
742362	2007 RF_{338}	—	September 10, 2007	Mount Lemmon	Mount Lemmon Survey	·	2.8 km	MPC · JPL
742363	2007 RC_{339}	—	September 13, 2007	Catalina	CSS	·	2.9 km	MPC · JPL
742364	2007 RK_{339}	—	September 15, 2007	Mount Lemmon	Mount Lemmon Survey	·	2.4 km	MPC · JPL
742365	2007 RQ_{339}	—	October 30, 2014	Mount Lemmon	Mount Lemmon Survey	·	2.9 km	MPC · JPL
742366	2007 RX_{339}	—	October 1, 2013	Mount Lemmon	Mount Lemmon Survey	·	2.4 km	MPC · JPL
742367	2007 RL_{340}	—	September 12, 2007	Mount Lemmon	Mount Lemmon Survey	EOS	1.6 km	MPC · JPL
742368	2007 RV_{340}	—	September 12, 2013	Mount Lemmon	Mount Lemmon Survey	·	2.2 km	MPC · JPL
742369	2007 RX_{340}	—	September 15, 2007	Mount Lemmon	Mount Lemmon Survey	·	2.5 km	MPC · JPL
742370	2007 RA_{341}	—	April 28, 2017	Haleakala	Pan-STARRS 1	·	2.3 km	MPC · JPL
742371	2007 RH_{341}	—	November 26, 2014	Haleakala	Pan-STARRS 1	·	2.8 km	MPC · JPL
742372	2007 RM_{341}	—	September 14, 2007	Mount Lemmon	Mount Lemmon Survey	·	2.5 km	MPC · JPL
742373	2007 RC_{342}	—	September 3, 2007	Mount Lemmon	Mount Lemmon Survey	H	460 m	MPC · JPL
742374	2007 RE_{342}	—	September 4, 2007	Mount Lemmon	Mount Lemmon Survey	·	2.8 km	MPC · JPL
742375	2007 RY_{342}	—	November 17, 2008	Kitt Peak	Spacewatch	·	2.6 km	MPC · JPL
742376	2007 RG_{343}	—	August 20, 2014	Haleakala	Pan-STARRS 1	·	630 m	MPC · JPL
742377	2007 RU_{343}	—	September 11, 2007	Mount Lemmon	Mount Lemmon Survey	·	2.6 km	MPC · JPL
742378	2007 RZ_{343}	—	September 4, 2007	Mount Lemmon	Mount Lemmon Survey	·	1.4 km	MPC · JPL
742379	2007 RB_{344}	—	March 22, 2015	Haleakala	Pan-STARRS 1	·	1.1 km	MPC · JPL
742380	2007 RF_{345}	—	February 25, 2015	Haleakala	Pan-STARRS 1	·	2.4 km	MPC · JPL
742381	2007 RU_{345}	—	September 12, 2007	Kitt Peak	Spacewatch	·	480 m	MPC · JPL
742382	2007 RW_{345}	—	September 5, 2007	Mount Lemmon	Mount Lemmon Survey	·	2.4 km	MPC · JPL
742383	2007 RY_{346}	—	September 13, 2007	Mount Lemmon	Mount Lemmon Survey	·	560 m	MPC · JPL
742384	2007 RJ_{347}	—	September 10, 2007	Mount Lemmon	Mount Lemmon Survey	·	1.0 km	MPC · JPL
742385	2007 RL_{347}	—	December 29, 2011	Mount Lemmon	Mount Lemmon Survey	·	520 m	MPC · JPL
742386	2007 RV_{349}	—	April 2, 2016	Haleakala	Pan-STARRS 1	·	2.2 km	MPC · JPL
742387	2007 RX_{349}	—	March 18, 2010	Kitt Peak	Spacewatch	VER	2.1 km	MPC · JPL
742388	2007 RC_{350}	—	September 5, 2016	Mount Lemmon	Mount Lemmon Survey	·	1.5 km	MPC · JPL
742389	2007 RW_{350}	—	January 17, 2016	Haleakala	Pan-STARRS 1	·	2.7 km	MPC · JPL
742390	2007 RX_{350}	—	September 14, 2007	Mount Lemmon	Mount Lemmon Survey	·	1.9 km	MPC · JPL
742391	2007 RC_{351}	—	September 13, 2007	Kitt Peak	Spacewatch	·	2.2 km	MPC · JPL
742392	2007 RM_{354}	—	September 14, 2007	Mount Lemmon	Mount Lemmon Survey	·	1.5 km	MPC · JPL
742393	2007 RG_{357}	—	September 10, 2007	Mount Lemmon	Mount Lemmon Survey	·	1.0 km	MPC · JPL
742394	2007 RU_{357}	—	September 14, 2007	Catalina	CSS	JUN	770 m	MPC · JPL
742395	2007 RJ_{362}	—	September 14, 2007	Mount Lemmon	Mount Lemmon Survey	·	1.2 km	MPC · JPL
742396	2007 RG_{363}	—	September 9, 2007	Kitt Peak	Spacewatch	(895)	2.6 km	MPC · JPL
742397	2007 RK_{363}	—	September 14, 2007	Catalina	CSS	·	950 m	MPC · JPL
742398	2007 RE_{364}	—	September 9, 2007	Mount Lemmon	Mount Lemmon Survey	·	1.3 km	MPC · JPL
742399	2007 RL_{364}	—	September 12, 2007	Mount Lemmon	Mount Lemmon Survey	·	1.1 km	MPC · JPL
742400	2007 RA_{365}	—	September 9, 2007	Mount Lemmon	Mount Lemmon Survey	·	820 m	MPC · JPL

== 742401–742500 ==
back to top

Designation			Discovery			Properties		Ref
Permanent	Provisional	Named after	Date	Site	Discoverer(s)	Category	Diam.	Ref
742401	2007 RC_{365}	—	September 13, 2007	Mount Lemmon	Mount Lemmon Survey	·	950 m	MPC · JPL
742402	2007 RM_{366}	—	September 13, 2007	Mount Lemmon	Mount Lemmon Survey	·	2.0 km	MPC · JPL
742403	2007 RH_{368}	—	September 14, 2007	Mount Lemmon	Mount Lemmon Survey	·	1.4 km	MPC · JPL
742404	2007 SO_{1}	—	September 19, 2007	Dauban	C. Rinner, F. Kugel	·	580 m	MPC · JPL
742405	2007 SG_{5}	—	September 11, 2007	Catalina	CSS	·	2.8 km	MPC · JPL
742406	2007 SV_{22}	—	September 20, 2007	Catalina	CSS	(1547)	1.8 km	MPC · JPL
742407	2007 SK_{25}	—	September 9, 2007	Kitt Peak	Spacewatch	HYG	2.3 km	MPC · JPL
742408	2007 SV_{25}	—	August 24, 2007	Kitt Peak	Spacewatch	·	1.5 km	MPC · JPL
742409	2007 SG_{26}	—	November 11, 2013	Mount Lemmon	Mount Lemmon Survey	·	2.8 km	MPC · JPL
742410	2007 SF_{27}	—	June 16, 2012	Mount Lemmon	Mount Lemmon Survey	·	2.7 km	MPC · JPL
742411	2007 TP_{3}	—	September 14, 2007	Mount Lemmon	Mount Lemmon Survey	·	950 m	MPC · JPL
742412	2007 TM_{6}	—	October 6, 2007	Dauban	C. Rinner, F. Kugel	·	2.5 km	MPC · JPL
742413	2007 TX_{9}	—	September 12, 2007	Mount Lemmon	Mount Lemmon Survey	·	1.1 km	MPC · JPL
742414	2007 TM_{17}	—	October 8, 2007	Catalina	CSS	·	1.1 km	MPC · JPL
742415	2007 TS_{19}	—	October 10, 2007	Catalina	CSS	APO · PHA	260 m	MPC · JPL
742416	2007 TP_{22}	—	October 8, 2007	Goodricke-Pigott	R. A. Tucker	·	1.4 km	MPC · JPL
742417	2007 TX_{23}	—	October 5, 2007	Kitt Peak	Spacewatch	·	1.5 km	MPC · JPL
742418	2007 TY_{35}	—	October 4, 2007	Kitt Peak	Spacewatch	EUN	860 m	MPC · JPL
742419	2007 TT_{41}	—	October 6, 2007	XuYi	PMO NEO Survey Program	·	1.2 km	MPC · JPL
742420	2007 TL_{42}	—	August 23, 2007	Kitt Peak	Spacewatch	·	2.5 km	MPC · JPL
742421	2007 TJ_{45}	—	October 7, 2007	Mount Lemmon	Mount Lemmon Survey	·	2.7 km	MPC · JPL
742422	2007 TJ_{47}	—	October 4, 2007	Kitt Peak	Spacewatch	AGN	970 m	MPC · JPL
742423	2007 TE_{56}	—	October 4, 2007	Kitt Peak	Spacewatch	·	540 m	MPC · JPL
742424	2007 TF_{62}	—	October 7, 2007	Mount Lemmon	Mount Lemmon Survey	·	910 m	MPC · JPL
742425	2007 TN_{62}	—	October 7, 2007	Mount Lemmon	Mount Lemmon Survey	·	620 m	MPC · JPL
742426	2007 TG_{64}	—	October 7, 2007	Mount Lemmon	Mount Lemmon Survey	EUN	1.0 km	MPC · JPL
742427	2007 TS_{71}	—	September 15, 2007	Kitt Peak	Spacewatch	·	1.0 km	MPC · JPL
742428	2007 TC_{75}	—	October 9, 2007	Kitt Peak	Spacewatch	DOR	2.1 km	MPC · JPL
742429	2007 TY_{80}	—	October 7, 2007	Mount Lemmon	Mount Lemmon Survey	·	1.2 km	MPC · JPL
742430	2007 TO_{81}	—	October 7, 2007	Catalina	CSS	JUN	900 m	MPC · JPL
742431	2007 TU_{83}	—	September 13, 2007	Kitt Peak	Spacewatch	·	2.1 km	MPC · JPL
742432	2007 TP_{89}	—	October 8, 2007	Mount Lemmon	Mount Lemmon Survey	MAR	1.1 km	MPC · JPL
742433	2007 TU_{90}	—	October 8, 2007	Mount Lemmon	Mount Lemmon Survey	·	1.4 km	MPC · JPL
742434	2007 TM_{91}	—	September 13, 2007	Mount Lemmon	Mount Lemmon Survey	·	1.2 km	MPC · JPL
742435	2007 TQ_{108}	—	September 15, 2007	Mount Lemmon	Mount Lemmon Survey	·	1.3 km	MPC · JPL
742436	2007 TY_{108}	—	September 20, 2007	Catalina	CSS	·	620 m	MPC · JPL
742437	2007 TN_{117}	—	October 9, 2007	Kitt Peak	Spacewatch	·	2.2 km	MPC · JPL
742438	2007 TD_{119}	—	October 9, 2007	Mount Lemmon	Mount Lemmon Survey	·	2.9 km	MPC · JPL
742439	2007 TD_{120}	—	September 12, 2007	Mount Lemmon	Mount Lemmon Survey	·	1.2 km	MPC · JPL
742440	2007 TE_{120}	—	October 8, 2007	Anderson Mesa	LONEOS	·	1.6 km	MPC · JPL
742441	2007 TX_{121}	—	October 6, 2007	Kitt Peak	Spacewatch	·	2.8 km	MPC · JPL
742442	2007 TR_{135}	—	October 8, 2007	Kitt Peak	Spacewatch	·	580 m	MPC · JPL
742443	2007 TB_{138}	—	October 8, 2007	Mount Lemmon	Mount Lemmon Survey	·	1.6 km	MPC · JPL
742444	2007 TY_{146}	—	September 20, 2007	Catalina	CSS	·	1.4 km	MPC · JPL
742445	2007 TB_{154}	—	October 8, 2007	Catalina	CSS	·	1.8 km	MPC · JPL
742446	2007 TG_{154}	—	September 14, 2007	Mount Lemmon	Mount Lemmon Survey	·	580 m	MPC · JPL
742447	2007 TT_{155}	—	October 5, 2007	Kitt Peak	Spacewatch	·	880 m	MPC · JPL
742448	2007 TJ_{158}	—	October 8, 2007	Catalina	CSS	(1547)	1.2 km	MPC · JPL
742449	2007 TJ_{159}	—	October 7, 2007	Catalina	CSS	·	1.3 km	MPC · JPL
742450	2007 TB_{162}	—	October 7, 2007	Mount Lemmon	Mount Lemmon Survey	MAS	680 m	MPC · JPL
742451	2007 TE_{162}	—	October 8, 2007	Mount Lemmon	Mount Lemmon Survey	·	1.5 km	MPC · JPL
742452	2007 TU_{162}	—	October 5, 2007	Kitt Peak	Spacewatch	JUN	790 m	MPC · JPL
742453	2007 TP_{186}	—	October 29, 2003	Kitt Peak	Spacewatch	·	650 m	MPC · JPL
742454	2007 TL_{188}	—	September 11, 2007	Mount Lemmon	Mount Lemmon Survey	·	1.6 km	MPC · JPL
742455	2007 TT_{188}	—	September 10, 2007	Mount Lemmon	Mount Lemmon Survey	·	2.5 km	MPC · JPL
742456	2007 TT_{195}	—	October 7, 2007	Mount Lemmon	Mount Lemmon Survey	·	2.6 km	MPC · JPL
742457	2007 TA_{196}	—	October 7, 2007	Mount Lemmon	Mount Lemmon Survey	·	1.1 km	MPC · JPL
742458	2007 TR_{197}	—	September 10, 2007	Catalina	CSS	·	500 m	MPC · JPL
742459	2007 TO_{198}	—	October 8, 2007	Kitt Peak	Spacewatch	·	2.4 km	MPC · JPL
742460	2007 TM_{201}	—	July 24, 2003	Palomar	NEAT	·	1.1 km	MPC · JPL
742461	2007 TZ_{201}	—	October 8, 2007	Mount Lemmon	Mount Lemmon Survey	·	540 m	MPC · JPL
742462	2007 TN_{204}	—	October 8, 2007	Mount Lemmon	Mount Lemmon Survey	·	2.6 km	MPC · JPL
742463	2007 TE_{207}	—	September 10, 2007	Mount Lemmon	Mount Lemmon Survey	·	1.3 km	MPC · JPL
742464	2007 TM_{211}	—	October 7, 2007	Kitt Peak	Spacewatch	(1547)	1.1 km	MPC · JPL
742465	2007 TB_{219}	—	October 8, 2007	Mount Lemmon	Mount Lemmon Survey	·	1.9 km	MPC · JPL
742466	2007 TD_{219}	—	September 10, 2007	Mount Lemmon	Mount Lemmon Survey	·	1.4 km	MPC · JPL
742467	2007 TK_{219}	—	October 8, 2007	Mount Lemmon	Mount Lemmon Survey	(194)	1.4 km	MPC · JPL
742468	2007 TW_{223}	—	October 10, 2007	Mount Lemmon	Mount Lemmon Survey	·	580 m	MPC · JPL
742469	2007 TA_{232}	—	October 8, 2007	Kitt Peak	Spacewatch	·	1.4 km	MPC · JPL
742470	2007 TC_{232}	—	October 8, 2007	Kitt Peak	Spacewatch	TIR	2.3 km	MPC · JPL
742471	2007 TQ_{232}	—	October 8, 2007	Kitt Peak	Spacewatch	·	1.7 km	MPC · JPL
742472	2007 TT_{236}	—	October 9, 2007	Mount Lemmon	Mount Lemmon Survey	·	660 m	MPC · JPL
742473	2007 TR_{238}	—	September 12, 2007	Mount Lemmon	Mount Lemmon Survey	·	620 m	MPC · JPL
742474	2007 TT_{241}	—	October 7, 2007	Mount Lemmon	Mount Lemmon Survey	·	1.2 km	MPC · JPL
742475	2007 TK_{243}	—	October 8, 2007	Catalina	CSS	·	1.0 km	MPC · JPL
742476	2007 TA_{248}	—	July 30, 2001	Palomar	NEAT	·	2.6 km	MPC · JPL
742477	2007 TK_{249}	—	October 11, 2007	Mount Lemmon	Mount Lemmon Survey	·	1.3 km	MPC · JPL
742478	2007 TY_{250}	—	October 11, 2007	Mount Lemmon	Mount Lemmon Survey	·	2.7 km	MPC · JPL
742479	2007 TK_{252}	—	October 7, 2007	Mount Lemmon	Mount Lemmon Survey	EUP	2.8 km	MPC · JPL
742480	2007 TH_{255}	—	October 10, 2007	Kitt Peak	Spacewatch	·	540 m	MPC · JPL
742481	2007 TU_{255}	—	October 10, 2007	Kitt Peak	Spacewatch	·	1.3 km	MPC · JPL
742482	2007 TX_{257}	—	September 13, 2007	Mount Lemmon	Mount Lemmon Survey	·	2.3 km	MPC · JPL
742483	2007 TE_{258}	—	October 10, 2007	Mount Lemmon	Mount Lemmon Survey	·	1.2 km	MPC · JPL
742484	2007 TF_{258}	—	September 13, 2007	Mount Lemmon	Mount Lemmon Survey	EOS	1.5 km	MPC · JPL
742485	2007 TG_{259}	—	October 10, 2007	Mount Lemmon	Mount Lemmon Survey	(895)	2.9 km	MPC · JPL
742486	2007 TN_{265}	—	October 11, 2007	Kitt Peak	Spacewatch	·	580 m	MPC · JPL
742487	2007 TO_{265}	—	October 11, 2007	Kitt Peak	Spacewatch	·	540 m	MPC · JPL
742488	2007 TR_{267}	—	October 9, 2007	Kitt Peak	Spacewatch	THM	1.8 km	MPC · JPL
742489	2007 TV_{268}	—	September 25, 2007	Mount Lemmon	Mount Lemmon Survey	·	580 m	MPC · JPL
742490	2007 TT_{271}	—	October 9, 2007	Kitt Peak	Spacewatch	·	1.2 km	MPC · JPL
742491	2007 TY_{272}	—	October 9, 2007	Kitt Peak	Spacewatch	·	2.5 km	MPC · JPL
742492	2007 TD_{283}	—	October 8, 2007	Mount Lemmon	Mount Lemmon Survey	·	540 m	MPC · JPL
742493	2007 TW_{287}	—	September 14, 2007	Catalina	CSS	·	1.4 km	MPC · JPL
742494	2007 TX_{288}	—	September 14, 2007	Catalina	CSS	JUN	1.1 km	MPC · JPL
742495	2007 TU_{291}	—	September 19, 2001	Kitt Peak	Spacewatch	·	2.0 km	MPC · JPL
742496	2007 TG_{295}	—	September 12, 2007	Mount Lemmon	Mount Lemmon Survey	·	3.1 km	MPC · JPL
742497	2007 TQ_{303}	—	October 12, 2007	Kitt Peak	Spacewatch	·	750 m	MPC · JPL
742498	2007 TR_{304}	—	October 13, 2007	Mount Lemmon	Mount Lemmon Survey	·	2.2 km	MPC · JPL
742499	2007 TX_{308}	—	October 10, 2007	Mount Lemmon	Mount Lemmon Survey	·	2.0 km	MPC · JPL
742500	2007 TT_{309}	—	September 10, 2007	Mount Lemmon	Mount Lemmon Survey	VER	2.3 km	MPC · JPL

== 742501–742600 ==
back to top

Designation			Discovery			Properties		Ref
Permanent	Provisional	Named after	Date	Site	Discoverer(s)	Category	Diam.	Ref
742501	2007 TA_{313}	—	October 11, 2007	Mount Lemmon	Mount Lemmon Survey	EOS	1.8 km	MPC · JPL
742502	2007 TV_{315}	—	October 12, 2007	Kitt Peak	Spacewatch	(69559)	2.4 km	MPC · JPL
742503	2007 TY_{318}	—	October 12, 2007	Kitt Peak	Spacewatch	·	1.5 km	MPC · JPL
742504	2007 TO_{323}	—	October 7, 2007	Kitt Peak	Spacewatch	·	600 m	MPC · JPL
742505	2007 TR_{329}	—	October 11, 2007	Kitt Peak	Spacewatch	·	1.2 km	MPC · JPL
742506	2007 TS_{331}	—	October 11, 2007	Kitt Peak	Spacewatch	HNS	830 m	MPC · JPL
742507	2007 TW_{336}	—	September 12, 2007	Anderson Mesa	LONEOS	·	470 m	MPC · JPL
742508	2007 TX_{339}	—	September 12, 2007	Kitt Peak	Spacewatch	·	780 m	MPC · JPL
742509	2007 TW_{345}	—	October 2, 2003	Kitt Peak	Spacewatch	·	940 m	MPC · JPL
742510	2007 TY_{346}	—	October 13, 2007	Mount Lemmon	Mount Lemmon Survey	(2076)	590 m	MPC · JPL
742511	2007 TJ_{349}	—	October 15, 2007	Mount Lemmon	Mount Lemmon Survey	·	2.1 km	MPC · JPL
742512	2007 TV_{351}	—	October 26, 2003	Kitt Peak	Spacewatch	·	970 m	MPC · JPL
742513	2007 TX_{357}	—	September 15, 2007	Kitt Peak	Spacewatch	·	2.3 km	MPC · JPL
742514	2007 TQ_{358}	—	December 1, 2003	Kitt Peak	Spacewatch	·	790 m	MPC · JPL
742515	2007 TO_{359}	—	September 13, 2007	Kitt Peak	Spacewatch	·	1.1 km	MPC · JPL
742516	2007 TZ_{360}	—	October 15, 2007	Mount Lemmon	Mount Lemmon Survey	THB	2.9 km	MPC · JPL
742517	2007 TS_{365}	—	September 13, 2007	Mount Lemmon	Mount Lemmon Survey	·	970 m	MPC · JPL
742518	2007 TN_{366}	—	October 9, 2007	Kitt Peak	Spacewatch	·	2.2 km	MPC · JPL
742519	2007 TC_{367}	—	September 10, 2007	Mount Lemmon	Mount Lemmon Survey	·	590 m	MPC · JPL
742520	2007 TN_{375}	—	September 14, 2007	Catalina	CSS	PHO	610 m	MPC · JPL
742521	2007 TR_{375}	—	September 13, 2007	Mount Lemmon	Mount Lemmon Survey	·	2.4 km	MPC · JPL
742522	2007 TB_{378}	—	October 12, 2007	Catalina	CSS	·	2.8 km	MPC · JPL
742523	2007 TN_{384}	—	October 14, 2007	Mount Lemmon	Mount Lemmon Survey	V	470 m	MPC · JPL
742524	2007 TK_{386}	—	October 10, 2007	Kitt Peak	Spacewatch	·	1.3 km	MPC · JPL
742525	2007 TD_{390}	—	September 12, 2007	Mount Lemmon	Mount Lemmon Survey	·	2.1 km	MPC · JPL
742526	2007 TH_{395}	—	October 15, 2007	Kitt Peak	Spacewatch	·	820 m	MPC · JPL
742527	2007 TE_{401}	—	October 15, 2007	Mount Lemmon	Mount Lemmon Survey	·	950 m	MPC · JPL
742528	2007 TM_{402}	—	October 15, 2007	Mount Lemmon	Mount Lemmon Survey	·	1.1 km	MPC · JPL
742529	2007 TR_{422}	—	October 10, 2007	Mount Lemmon	Mount Lemmon Survey	·	2.6 km	MPC · JPL
742530	2007 TS_{423}	—	October 6, 2007	Kitt Peak	Spacewatch	T_{j} (2.99)	2.6 km	MPC · JPL
742531	2007 TH_{424}	—	October 7, 2007	Mount Lemmon	Mount Lemmon Survey	VER	2.3 km	MPC · JPL
742532	2007 TM_{425}	—	October 8, 2007	Catalina	CSS	·	790 m	MPC · JPL
742533	2007 TE_{433}	—	October 8, 2007	Kitt Peak	Spacewatch	·	580 m	MPC · JPL
742534	2007 TJ_{438}	—	October 8, 2007	Mount Lemmon	Mount Lemmon Survey	·	2.6 km	MPC · JPL
742535	2007 TO_{443}	—	October 8, 2007	Catalina	CSS	·	1.5 km	MPC · JPL
742536	2007 TU_{443}	—	October 12, 2007	Catalina	CSS	·	1.2 km	MPC · JPL
742537	2007 TJ_{445}	—	October 4, 2007	Kitt Peak	Spacewatch	·	2.0 km	MPC · JPL
742538	2007 TH_{447}	—	October 11, 2007	Kitt Peak	Spacewatch	·	1.4 km	MPC · JPL
742539	2007 TF_{450}	—	September 12, 2007	Mount Lemmon	Mount Lemmon Survey	·	900 m	MPC · JPL
742540	2007 TE_{456}	—	October 15, 2007	Mount Lemmon	Mount Lemmon Survey	VER	2.5 km	MPC · JPL
742541	2007 TV_{456}	—	October 7, 2007	Mount Lemmon	Mount Lemmon Survey	·	1.4 km	MPC · JPL
742542	2007 TR_{457}	—	October 10, 2007	Catalina	CSS	·	1.1 km	MPC · JPL
742543	2007 TL_{461}	—	October 9, 2007	Anderson Mesa	LONEOS	·	620 m	MPC · JPL
742544	2007 TT_{461}	—	October 8, 2007	Mount Lemmon	Mount Lemmon Survey	·	1.2 km	MPC · JPL
742545	2007 TM_{463}	—	June 7, 2015	Haleakala	Pan-STARRS 1	·	1.4 km	MPC · JPL
742546	2007 TW_{463}	—	October 9, 2016	Haleakala	Pan-STARRS 1	HNS	790 m	MPC · JPL
742547	2007 TC_{464}	—	July 28, 2011	Haleakala	Pan-STARRS 1	·	1.1 km	MPC · JPL
742548	2007 TP_{464}	—	October 10, 2007	Kitt Peak	Spacewatch	·	1.3 km	MPC · JPL
742549	2007 TR_{464}	—	October 9, 2007	Kitt Peak	Spacewatch	·	1.4 km	MPC · JPL
742550	2007 TJ_{465}	—	November 30, 2014	Mount Lemmon	Mount Lemmon Survey	(2076)	530 m	MPC · JPL
742551	2007 TL_{465}	—	December 12, 2014	Haleakala	Pan-STARRS 1	·	3.0 km	MPC · JPL
742552	2007 TD_{466}	—	October 11, 2007	Catalina	CSS	TIR	2.7 km	MPC · JPL
742553	2007 TN_{466}	—	April 1, 2011	Kitt Peak	Spacewatch	TIR	2.2 km	MPC · JPL
742554	2007 TS_{466}	—	March 11, 2016	Haleakala	Pan-STARRS 1	·	2.9 km	MPC · JPL
742555	2007 TD_{467}	—	March 18, 2016	Mount Lemmon	Mount Lemmon Survey	·	570 m	MPC · JPL
742556	2007 TP_{468}	—	February 10, 2016	Haleakala	Pan-STARRS 1	VER	2.4 km	MPC · JPL
742557	2007 TX_{468}	—	March 16, 2015	Kitt Peak	Spacewatch	·	2.2 km	MPC · JPL
742558	2007 TL_{469}	—	October 12, 2007	Mount Lemmon	Mount Lemmon Survey	EUN	1.1 km	MPC · JPL
742559	2007 TQ_{469}	—	December 3, 2008	Mount Lemmon	Mount Lemmon Survey	·	2.4 km	MPC · JPL
742560	2007 TJ_{470}	—	October 4, 2007	Kitt Peak	Spacewatch	·	2.3 km	MPC · JPL
742561	2007 TO_{470}	—	October 11, 2007	Kitt Peak	Spacewatch	·	2.2 km	MPC · JPL
742562	2007 TR_{470}	—	February 23, 2015	Haleakala	Pan-STARRS 1	EOS	1.9 km	MPC · JPL
742563	2007 TU_{470}	—	September 9, 2007	Kitt Peak	Spacewatch	·	970 m	MPC · JPL
742564	2007 TZ_{470}	—	August 24, 2007	Kitt Peak	Spacewatch	EOS	1.4 km	MPC · JPL
742565	2007 TC_{473}	—	October 12, 2007	Kitt Peak	Spacewatch	·	1.3 km	MPC · JPL
742566	2007 TX_{474}	—	February 12, 2015	Haleakala	Pan-STARRS 1	·	2.9 km	MPC · JPL
742567	2007 TP_{476}	—	October 8, 2007	Mount Lemmon	Mount Lemmon Survey	(18466)	1.7 km	MPC · JPL
742568	2007 TW_{476}	—	September 13, 2007	Mount Lemmon	Mount Lemmon Survey	·	2.5 km	MPC · JPL
742569	2007 TP_{477}	—	October 10, 2007	Kitt Peak	Spacewatch	·	2.0 km	MPC · JPL
742570	2007 TM_{481}	—	October 11, 2007	Kitt Peak	Spacewatch	·	2.2 km	MPC · JPL
742571	2007 TT_{481}	—	October 13, 2007	Mount Lemmon	Mount Lemmon Survey	·	2.3 km	MPC · JPL
742572	2007 TA_{482}	—	October 11, 2007	Kitt Peak	Spacewatch	·	2.6 km	MPC · JPL
742573	2007 TZ_{483}	—	October 13, 2007	Mount Lemmon	Mount Lemmon Survey	·	1.2 km	MPC · JPL
742574	2007 TZ_{484}	—	October 15, 2007	Kitt Peak	Spacewatch	·	460 m	MPC · JPL
742575	2007 TQ_{487}	—	October 7, 2007	Mount Lemmon	Mount Lemmon Survey	(12739)	1.4 km	MPC · JPL
742576	2007 TA_{488}	—	October 12, 2007	Catalina	CSS	·	1.2 km	MPC · JPL
742577	2007 TN_{489}	—	October 9, 2007	Kitt Peak	Spacewatch	·	570 m	MPC · JPL
742578	2007 TO_{489}	—	October 7, 2007	Kitt Peak	Spacewatch	·	1.5 km	MPC · JPL
742579	2007 TU_{489}	—	October 15, 2007	Mount Lemmon	Mount Lemmon Survey	ADE	1.5 km	MPC · JPL
742580	2007 TY_{490}	—	October 8, 2007	Mount Lemmon	Mount Lemmon Survey	·	2.5 km	MPC · JPL
742581	2007 TC_{491}	—	October 7, 2007	Mount Lemmon	Mount Lemmon Survey	·	1.2 km	MPC · JPL
742582	2007 TJ_{491}	—	October 15, 2007	Mount Lemmon	Mount Lemmon Survey	·	1.1 km	MPC · JPL
742583	2007 TP_{492}	—	October 14, 2007	Mount Lemmon	Mount Lemmon Survey	·	1.2 km	MPC · JPL
742584	2007 TA_{494}	—	October 12, 2007	Mount Lemmon	Mount Lemmon Survey	·	2.4 km	MPC · JPL
742585	2007 TA_{496}	—	October 11, 2007	Mount Lemmon	Mount Lemmon Survey	HNS	810 m	MPC · JPL
742586	2007 TF_{499}	—	October 9, 2007	Kitt Peak	Spacewatch	·	2.1 km	MPC · JPL
742587	2007 TM_{503}	—	October 8, 2007	Kitt Peak	Spacewatch	NYS	1.1 km	MPC · JPL
742588	2007 TO_{503}	—	October 14, 2007	Mount Lemmon	Mount Lemmon Survey	KOR	1.3 km	MPC · JPL
742589	2007 UU_{2}	—	September 15, 2007	Lulin	LUSS	H	440 m	MPC · JPL
742590	2007 UH_{4}	—	October 10, 2007	Catalina	CSS	·	610 m	MPC · JPL
742591	2007 UT_{7}	—	October 16, 2007	Catalina	CSS	JUN	920 m	MPC · JPL
742592	2007 UP_{10}	—	September 25, 2007	Mount Lemmon	Mount Lemmon Survey	·	740 m	MPC · JPL
742593	2007 UW_{18}	—	September 12, 2007	Mount Lemmon	Mount Lemmon Survey	·	1.3 km	MPC · JPL
742594	2007 UH_{30}	—	October 10, 2007	Catalina	CSS	·	1.4 km	MPC · JPL
742595	2007 UU_{33}	—	October 9, 2007	Catalina	CSS	(1547)	1.4 km	MPC · JPL
742596	2007 UC_{35}	—	October 11, 2007	Catalina	CSS	LEO	1.4 km	MPC · JPL
742597	2007 UH_{36}	—	October 19, 2007	Catalina	CSS	·	1.9 km	MPC · JPL
742598	2007 UT_{37}	—	October 19, 2007	Catalina	CSS	·	1.1 km	MPC · JPL
742599	2007 UR_{44}	—	October 18, 2007	Mount Lemmon	Mount Lemmon Survey	·	1.9 km	MPC · JPL
742600	2007 UX_{45}	—	October 11, 2007	Kitt Peak	Spacewatch	·	1.0 km	MPC · JPL

== 742601–742700 ==
back to top

Designation			Discovery			Properties		Ref
Permanent	Provisional	Named after	Date	Site	Discoverer(s)	Category	Diam.	Ref
742601	2007 UE_{48}	—	October 20, 2007	Mount Lemmon	Mount Lemmon Survey	·	910 m	MPC · JPL
742602	2007 UU_{54}	—	September 15, 2007	Mount Lemmon	Mount Lemmon Survey	·	1.3 km	MPC · JPL
742603	2007 UL_{60}	—	October 30, 2007	Mount Lemmon	Mount Lemmon Survey	HNS	870 m	MPC · JPL
742604	2007 US_{61}	—	October 18, 2007	Kitt Peak	Spacewatch	·	540 m	MPC · JPL
742605	2007 UO_{62}	—	September 18, 2007	Kitt Peak	Spacewatch	·	2.3 km	MPC · JPL
742606	2007 UX_{67}	—	October 21, 2007	Mount Lemmon	Mount Lemmon Survey	ADE	1.5 km	MPC · JPL
742607	2007 UZ_{70}	—	October 8, 2007	Kitt Peak	Spacewatch	·	620 m	MPC · JPL
742608	2007 UJ_{75}	—	September 15, 2007	Mount Lemmon	Mount Lemmon Survey	·	1.3 km	MPC · JPL
742609	2007 UH_{77}	—	September 10, 2007	Mount Lemmon	Mount Lemmon Survey	·	2.7 km	MPC · JPL
742610	2007 UP_{78}	—	October 16, 2007	Kitt Peak	Spacewatch	·	750 m	MPC · JPL
742611	2007 UO_{84}	—	September 18, 2007	Mount Lemmon	Mount Lemmon Survey	·	850 m	MPC · JPL
742612	2007 UQ_{85}	—	September 14, 2007	Mount Lemmon	Mount Lemmon Survey	·	2.5 km	MPC · JPL
742613	2007 UA_{93}	—	October 15, 2007	Catalina	CSS	·	1.5 km	MPC · JPL
742614	2007 UR_{94}	—	October 31, 2007	Mount Lemmon	Mount Lemmon Survey	(883)	580 m	MPC · JPL
742615	2007 UH_{95}	—	October 31, 2007	Mount Lemmon	Mount Lemmon Survey	·	2.2 km	MPC · JPL
742616	2007 US_{95}	—	September 12, 2007	Mount Lemmon	Mount Lemmon Survey	·	1.5 km	MPC · JPL
742617	2007 UV_{96}	—	October 30, 2007	Kitt Peak	Spacewatch	·	2.6 km	MPC · JPL
742618	2007 UU_{97}	—	October 30, 2007	Mount Lemmon	Mount Lemmon Survey	·	1.9 km	MPC · JPL
742619	2007 UM_{107}	—	October 31, 2007	Catalina	CSS	·	1.4 km	MPC · JPL
742620	2007 UL_{109}	—	September 10, 2007	Mount Lemmon	Mount Lemmon Survey	THM	2.2 km	MPC · JPL
742621	2007 UL_{110}	—	October 12, 2007	Kitt Peak	Spacewatch	·	1.8 km	MPC · JPL
742622	2007 UH_{113}	—	October 31, 2007	Kitt Peak	Spacewatch	·	480 m	MPC · JPL
742623	2007 UE_{117}	—	October 30, 2007	Mount Lemmon	Mount Lemmon Survey	(5)	930 m	MPC · JPL
742624	2007 UP_{119}	—	September 14, 2007	Mount Lemmon	Mount Lemmon Survey	·	2.2 km	MPC · JPL
742625	2007 UD_{128}	—	October 17, 2007	Mount Lemmon	Mount Lemmon Survey	TIR	2.4 km	MPC · JPL
742626	2007 UF_{132}	—	October 19, 2007	Catalina	CSS	·	1.1 km	MPC · JPL
742627	2007 UZ_{134}	—	October 30, 2007	Mount Lemmon	Mount Lemmon Survey	EOS	1.5 km	MPC · JPL
742628	2007 UU_{138}	—	October 20, 2007	Mount Lemmon	Mount Lemmon Survey	·	3.2 km	MPC · JPL
742629	2007 UZ_{140}	—	October 21, 2007	Mount Lemmon	Mount Lemmon Survey	·	1.9 km	MPC · JPL
742630	2007 UW_{144}	—	October 20, 2007	Mount Lemmon	Mount Lemmon Survey	·	580 m	MPC · JPL
742631	2007 UV_{145}	—	October 31, 2007	Mount Lemmon	Mount Lemmon Survey	·	550 m	MPC · JPL
742632	2007 UX_{145}	—	October 26, 2007	Mount Lemmon	Mount Lemmon Survey	·	3.0 km	MPC · JPL
742633	2007 UD_{146}	—	October 18, 2007	Kitt Peak	Spacewatch	·	2.4 km	MPC · JPL
742634	2007 UG_{148}	—	September 16, 2017	Haleakala	Pan-STARRS 1	·	1.6 km	MPC · JPL
742635	2007 UO_{148}	—	October 24, 2007	Mount Lemmon	Mount Lemmon Survey	·	2.7 km	MPC · JPL
742636	2007 UR_{148}	—	June 5, 2014	Haleakala	Pan-STARRS 1	·	990 m	MPC · JPL
742637	2007 UF_{149}	—	October 20, 2011	Kitt Peak	Spacewatch	·	840 m	MPC · JPL
742638	2007 UK_{149}	—	October 16, 2007	Mount Lemmon	Mount Lemmon Survey	·	2.2 km	MPC · JPL
742639	2007 UL_{149}	—	October 21, 2007	Mount Lemmon	Mount Lemmon Survey	EOS	1.8 km	MPC · JPL
742640	2007 UN_{149}	—	February 20, 2015	Haleakala	Pan-STARRS 1	·	2.3 km	MPC · JPL
742641	2007 UL_{150}	—	March 4, 2016	Haleakala	Pan-STARRS 1	·	2.2 km	MPC · JPL
742642	2007 UP_{150}	—	October 7, 2007	Mount Lemmon	Mount Lemmon Survey	·	1.1 km	MPC · JPL
742643	2007 UE_{153}	—	October 21, 2007	Mount Lemmon	Mount Lemmon Survey	·	1.3 km	MPC · JPL
742644	2007 UB_{154}	—	October 5, 2013	Kitt Peak	Spacewatch	·	2.3 km	MPC · JPL
742645	2007 UY_{155}	—	October 19, 2007	Kitt Peak	Spacewatch	·	2.1 km	MPC · JPL
742646	2007 UA_{158}	—	October 16, 2007	Mount Lemmon	Mount Lemmon Survey	·	1.5 km	MPC · JPL
742647	2007 UE_{160}	—	October 20, 2007	Mount Lemmon	Mount Lemmon Survey	·	1.6 km	MPC · JPL
742648	2007 VM_{1}	—	November 2, 2007	Front Royal	Skillman, D. R.	·	1.2 km	MPC · JPL
742649	2007 VN_{10}	—	November 3, 2007	Farra d'Isonzo	Farra d'Isonzo	·	2.8 km	MPC · JPL
742650	2007 VS_{19}	—	November 1, 2007	Kitt Peak	Spacewatch	·	2.7 km	MPC · JPL
742651	2007 VD_{22}	—	October 20, 2007	Kitt Peak	Spacewatch	·	560 m	MPC · JPL
742652	2007 VF_{24}	—	October 8, 2007	Mount Lemmon	Mount Lemmon Survey	·	610 m	MPC · JPL
742653	2007 VA_{31}	—	November 2, 2007	Catalina	CSS	·	450 m	MPC · JPL
742654	2007 VG_{31}	—	November 2, 2007	Kitt Peak	Spacewatch	·	2.1 km	MPC · JPL
742655	2007 VU_{31}	—	October 11, 2007	Kitt Peak	Spacewatch	·	3.1 km	MPC · JPL
742656	2007 VX_{31}	—	November 2, 2007	Kitt Peak	Spacewatch	EUP	2.3 km	MPC · JPL
742657	2007 VE_{41}	—	October 16, 2007	Kitt Peak	Spacewatch	·	460 m	MPC · JPL
742658	2007 VK_{42}	—	November 3, 2007	Mount Lemmon	Mount Lemmon Survey	·	630 m	MPC · JPL
742659	2007 VE_{49}	—	September 15, 2007	Charleston	R. Holmes	·	1.1 km	MPC · JPL
742660	2007 VJ_{58}	—	October 21, 2007	Mount Lemmon	Mount Lemmon Survey	·	1.7 km	MPC · JPL
742661	2007 VK_{58}	—	November 1, 2007	Kitt Peak	Spacewatch	·	1.3 km	MPC · JPL
742662	2007 VP_{59}	—	November 1, 2007	Kitt Peak	Spacewatch	(5)	930 m	MPC · JPL
742663	2007 VR_{59}	—	October 16, 2007	Mount Lemmon	Mount Lemmon Survey	·	640 m	MPC · JPL
742664	2007 VU_{64}	—	November 1, 2007	Kitt Peak	Spacewatch	·	1.3 km	MPC · JPL
742665	2007 VW_{66}	—	November 2, 2007	Kitt Peak	Spacewatch	·	520 m	MPC · JPL
742666	2007 VC_{74}	—	September 12, 2007	Mount Lemmon	Mount Lemmon Survey	THM	1.7 km	MPC · JPL
742667	2007 VX_{80}	—	November 4, 2007	Kitt Peak	Spacewatch	·	2.7 km	MPC · JPL
742668	2007 VR_{86}	—	November 9, 2007	Catalina	CSS	·	1.2 km	MPC · JPL
742669	2007 VH_{101}	—	November 2, 2007	Kitt Peak	Spacewatch	MAR	660 m	MPC · JPL
742670	2007 VA_{103}	—	October 9, 2007	Mount Lemmon	Mount Lemmon Survey	·	490 m	MPC · JPL
742671	2007 VC_{103}	—	November 3, 2007	Kitt Peak	Spacewatch	V	440 m	MPC · JPL
742672	2007 VF_{104}	—	November 3, 2007	Kitt Peak	Spacewatch	HNS	820 m	MPC · JPL
742673	2007 VE_{113}	—	October 16, 2007	Mount Lemmon	Mount Lemmon Survey	·	2.7 km	MPC · JPL
742674	2007 VB_{115}	—	November 3, 2007	Kitt Peak	Spacewatch	·	600 m	MPC · JPL
742675	2007 VD_{118}	—	November 4, 2007	Kitt Peak	Spacewatch	·	1.2 km	MPC · JPL
742676	2007 VZ_{135}	—	October 10, 2007	Mount Lemmon	Mount Lemmon Survey	·	1.6 km	MPC · JPL
742677	2007 VX_{137}	—	November 8, 2007	Socorro	LINEAR	AMO	710 m	MPC · JPL
742678	2007 VW_{142}	—	August 24, 2001	Anderson Mesa	LONEOS	·	1.9 km	MPC · JPL
742679	2007 VZ_{152}	—	October 18, 2007	Mount Lemmon	Mount Lemmon Survey	·	2.5 km	MPC · JPL
742680	2007 VA_{153}	—	November 3, 2007	Kitt Peak	Spacewatch	T_{j} (2.97)	2.1 km	MPC · JPL
742681	2007 VJ_{154}	—	September 18, 2007	Mount Lemmon	Mount Lemmon Survey	·	2.5 km	MPC · JPL
742682	2007 VX_{154}	—	November 5, 2007	Kitt Peak	Spacewatch	·	2.1 km	MPC · JPL
742683	2007 VA_{155}	—	November 5, 2007	Kitt Peak	Spacewatch	·	530 m	MPC · JPL
742684	2007 VT_{157}	—	October 20, 2007	Mount Lemmon	Mount Lemmon Survey	·	1.7 km	MPC · JPL
742685	2007 VM_{167}	—	November 5, 2007	Kitt Peak	Spacewatch	·	2.2 km	MPC · JPL
742686	2007 VJ_{168}	—	November 5, 2007	Kitt Peak	Spacewatch	·	1.3 km	MPC · JPL
742687	2007 VU_{174}	—	November 4, 2007	Mount Lemmon	Mount Lemmon Survey	EOS	1.5 km	MPC · JPL
742688	2007 VQ_{182}	—	November 8, 2007	Mount Lemmon	Mount Lemmon Survey	·	730 m	MPC · JPL
742689	2007 VO_{184}	—	November 6, 2007	Marly	Kocher, F.	NYS	780 m	MPC · JPL
742690	2007 VR_{186}	—	November 12, 2007	Bisei	BATTeRS	·	610 m	MPC · JPL
742691	2007 VO_{189}	—	June 12, 2007	Catalina	CSS	·	2.1 km	MPC · JPL
742692	2007 VC_{190}	—	October 19, 2007	Anderson Mesa	LONEOS	·	2.6 km	MPC · JPL
742693	2007 VX_{193}	—	October 13, 2007	Mount Lemmon	Mount Lemmon Survey	·	3.4 km	MPC · JPL
742694	2007 VU_{197}	—	October 15, 2007	Kitt Peak	Spacewatch	·	610 m	MPC · JPL
742695	2007 VB_{214}	—	October 14, 2007	Mount Lemmon	Mount Lemmon Survey	·	3.0 km	MPC · JPL
742696	2007 VX_{221}	—	November 5, 2007	Kitt Peak	Spacewatch	·	1.6 km	MPC · JPL
742697	2007 VK_{224}	—	November 5, 2007	Kitt Peak	Spacewatch	·	2.8 km	MPC · JPL
742698	2007 VX_{226}	—	November 11, 2007	Mount Lemmon	Mount Lemmon Survey	·	1.6 km	MPC · JPL
742699	2007 VV_{233}	—	November 8, 2007	Kitt Peak	Spacewatch	·	1.1 km	MPC · JPL
742700	2007 VX_{235}	—	November 2, 2007	Kitt Peak	Spacewatch	AGN	1.1 km	MPC · JPL

== 742701–742800 ==
back to top

Designation			Discovery			Properties		Ref
Permanent	Provisional	Named after	Date	Site	Discoverer(s)	Category	Diam.	Ref
742701	2007 VL_{236}	—	November 3, 2007	Mount Lemmon	Mount Lemmon Survey	·	940 m	MPC · JPL
742702	2007 VN_{236}	—	November 11, 2007	Mount Lemmon	Mount Lemmon Survey	·	490 m	MPC · JPL
742703	2007 VG_{239}	—	November 13, 2007	Kitt Peak	Spacewatch	·	1.2 km	MPC · JPL
742704	2007 VH_{246}	—	November 9, 2007	Mount Lemmon	Mount Lemmon Survey	·	2.7 km	MPC · JPL
742705	2007 VB_{247}	—	November 9, 2007	Mount Lemmon	Mount Lemmon Survey	KON	1.6 km	MPC · JPL
742706	2007 VP_{251}	—	November 9, 2007	Mount Lemmon	Mount Lemmon Survey	·	1.5 km	MPC · JPL
742707	2007 VM_{256}	—	June 3, 2003	Kitt Peak	Spacewatch	·	610 m	MPC · JPL
742708	2007 VW_{256}	—	November 2, 2007	Mount Lemmon	Mount Lemmon Survey	EOS	1.4 km	MPC · JPL
742709	2007 VK_{262}	—	September 8, 2007	Mount Lemmon	Mount Lemmon Survey	TIR	2.4 km	MPC · JPL
742710	2007 VD_{263}	—	November 30, 2003	Kitt Peak	Spacewatch	·	1.1 km	MPC · JPL
742711	2007 VV_{266}	—	October 9, 2007	Kitt Peak	Spacewatch	·	1.1 km	MPC · JPL
742712	2007 VV_{277}	—	September 14, 2007	Mount Lemmon	Mount Lemmon Survey	·	600 m	MPC · JPL
742713	2007 VH_{280}	—	November 3, 2007	Kitt Peak	Spacewatch	·	2.4 km	MPC · JPL
742714	2007 VU_{282}	—	November 8, 2007	Kitt Peak	Spacewatch	·	1.1 km	MPC · JPL
742715	2007 VT_{285}	—	October 30, 2007	Kitt Peak	Spacewatch	EUN	1.1 km	MPC · JPL
742716	2007 VZ_{285}	—	November 14, 2007	Kitt Peak	Spacewatch	·	1.1 km	MPC · JPL
742717	2007 VQ_{288}	—	November 1, 2007	Kitt Peak	Spacewatch	·	1.0 km	MPC · JPL
742718	2007 VW_{289}	—	November 14, 2007	Mount Lemmon	Mount Lemmon Survey	·	1.6 km	MPC · JPL
742719	2007 VF_{290}	—	November 14, 2007	Kitt Peak	Spacewatch	·	930 m	MPC · JPL
742720	2007 VU_{291}	—	September 15, 2007	Mount Lemmon	Mount Lemmon Survey	·	1.3 km	MPC · JPL
742721	2007 VK_{292}	—	November 8, 2007	Kitt Peak	Spacewatch	JUN	770 m	MPC · JPL
742722	2007 VZ_{299}	—	October 16, 2007	Catalina	CSS	·	1.3 km	MPC · JPL
742723	2007 VB_{300}	—	November 13, 2007	Catalina	CSS	·	1.6 km	MPC · JPL
742724	2007 VK_{300}	—	November 7, 2007	Catalina	CSS	·	1.4 km	MPC · JPL
742725	2007 VY_{302}	—	October 15, 2007	Catalina	CSS	·	1.5 km	MPC · JPL
742726	2007 VF_{303}	—	October 15, 2007	Catalina	CSS	·	2.7 km	MPC · JPL
742727	2007 VM_{310}	—	November 7, 2007	Mount Lemmon	Mount Lemmon Survey	EUN	1.1 km	MPC · JPL
742728	2007 VR_{319}	—	November 8, 2007	Kitt Peak	Spacewatch	·	1.3 km	MPC · JPL
742729	2007 VJ_{323}	—	November 3, 2007	Kitt Peak	Spacewatch	HOF	2.6 km	MPC · JPL
742730	2007 VV_{325}	—	November 8, 2007	Socorro	LINEAR	GAL	1.9 km	MPC · JPL
742731	2007 VM_{327}	—	November 7, 2007	Kitt Peak	Spacewatch	·	620 m	MPC · JPL
742732	2007 VP_{328}	—	December 16, 2007	Catalina	CSS	·	1.6 km	MPC · JPL
742733	2007 VZ_{336}	—	September 14, 2007	Mount Lemmon	Mount Lemmon Survey	·	2.5 km	MPC · JPL
742734	2007 VE_{339}	—	November 7, 2007	Mount Lemmon	Mount Lemmon Survey	·	1.5 km	MPC · JPL
742735	2007 VN_{339}	—	November 13, 2007	Kitt Peak	Spacewatch	AGN	950 m	MPC · JPL
742736	2007 VM_{340}	—	November 3, 2007	Mount Lemmon	Mount Lemmon Survey	·	1.1 km	MPC · JPL
742737	2007 VB_{341}	—	November 7, 2007	Mount Lemmon	Mount Lemmon Survey	·	1.2 km	MPC · JPL
742738	2007 VM_{341}	—	November 9, 2007	Catalina	CSS	·	2.2 km	MPC · JPL
742739	2007 VU_{342}	—	January 31, 2015	Haleakala	Pan-STARRS 1	JUN	1.2 km	MPC · JPL
742740	2007 VB_{343}	—	September 4, 2007	Catalina	CSS	·	1.7 km	MPC · JPL
742741	2007 VE_{343}	—	November 3, 2007	Kitt Peak	Spacewatch	·	620 m	MPC · JPL
742742	2007 VM_{343}	—	November 3, 2007	Kitt Peak	Spacewatch	·	640 m	MPC · JPL
742743	2007 VV_{344}	—	February 16, 2015	Haleakala	Pan-STARRS 1	·	1.3 km	MPC · JPL
742744	2007 VW_{344}	—	November 13, 2007	Mount Lemmon	Mount Lemmon Survey	·	840 m	MPC · JPL
742745	2007 VH_{345}	—	September 4, 2011	Haleakala	Pan-STARRS 1	(1547)	1.1 km	MPC · JPL
742746	2007 VN_{345}	—	September 30, 2016	Haleakala	Pan-STARRS 1	·	1.5 km	MPC · JPL
742747	2007 VT_{347}	—	November 2, 2007	Kitt Peak	Spacewatch	·	1.4 km	MPC · JPL
742748	2007 VG_{349}	—	August 14, 2012	Siding Spring	SSS	·	2.9 km	MPC · JPL
742749	2007 VY_{349}	—	February 22, 2009	Kitt Peak	Spacewatch	·	670 m	MPC · JPL
742750	2007 VB_{350}	—	February 9, 2013	Haleakala	Pan-STARRS 1	·	810 m	MPC · JPL
742751	2007 VS_{350}	—	March 27, 2014	Haleakala	Pan-STARRS 1	·	730 m	MPC · JPL
742752	2007 VA_{351}	—	November 12, 2007	Mount Lemmon	Mount Lemmon Survey	·	520 m	MPC · JPL
742753	2007 VZ_{351}	—	August 26, 2012	Haleakala	Pan-STARRS 1	·	2.4 km	MPC · JPL
742754	2007 VT_{352}	—	November 2, 2007	Kitt Peak	Spacewatch	·	2.5 km	MPC · JPL
742755	2007 VT_{355}	—	April 4, 2014	Kitt Peak	Spacewatch	·	1.4 km	MPC · JPL
742756	2007 VU_{355}	—	January 30, 2009	Mount Lemmon	Mount Lemmon Survey	·	1.6 km	MPC · JPL
742757	2007 VT_{356}	—	October 14, 2007	Mount Lemmon	Mount Lemmon Survey	·	500 m	MPC · JPL
742758	2007 VT_{359}	—	May 19, 2012	Mount Lemmon	Mount Lemmon Survey	THB	1.8 km	MPC · JPL
742759	2007 VR_{360}	—	October 4, 2018	Haleakala	Pan-STARRS 2	·	2.3 km	MPC · JPL
742760	2007 VU_{360}	—	November 9, 2007	Mount Lemmon	Mount Lemmon Survey	VER	2.1 km	MPC · JPL
742761	2007 VX_{360}	—	January 21, 2015	Haleakala	Pan-STARRS 1	·	2.7 km	MPC · JPL
742762	2007 VR_{361}	—	October 10, 2015	Tenerife	ESA OGS	EUN	860 m	MPC · JPL
742763	2007 VD_{362}	—	February 22, 2009	Kitt Peak	Spacewatch	·	540 m	MPC · JPL
742764	2007 VB_{363}	—	November 9, 2007	Mount Lemmon	Mount Lemmon Survey	THM	1.8 km	MPC · JPL
742765	2007 VR_{363}	—	November 11, 2007	Mount Lemmon	Mount Lemmon Survey	·	2.5 km	MPC · JPL
742766	2007 VQ_{364}	—	November 3, 2007	Catalina	CSS	·	2.3 km	MPC · JPL
742767	2007 VT_{369}	—	November 3, 2007	Kitt Peak	Spacewatch	·	1.3 km	MPC · JPL
742768	2007 VB_{370}	—	November 2, 2007	Kitt Peak	Spacewatch	·	1.6 km	MPC · JPL
742769	2007 VD_{370}	—	November 7, 2007	Kitt Peak	Spacewatch	·	2.5 km	MPC · JPL
742770	2007 VU_{370}	—	November 9, 2007	Mount Lemmon	Mount Lemmon Survey	·	1.4 km	MPC · JPL
742771	2007 VZ_{370}	—	November 8, 2007	Kitt Peak	Spacewatch	·	1.3 km	MPC · JPL
742772	2007 VS_{372}	—	November 4, 2007	Kitt Peak	Spacewatch	·	980 m	MPC · JPL
742773	2007 VD_{373}	—	November 7, 2007	Mount Lemmon	Mount Lemmon Survey	·	1.4 km	MPC · JPL
742774	2007 VE_{373}	—	November 5, 2007	Kitt Peak	Spacewatch	·	930 m	MPC · JPL
742775	2007 VA_{374}	—	November 9, 2007	Mount Lemmon	Mount Lemmon Survey	EOS	1.6 km	MPC · JPL
742776	2007 VO_{374}	—	November 2, 2007	Kitt Peak	Spacewatch	·	1.1 km	MPC · JPL
742777	2007 WG_{6}	—	November 17, 2007	Socorro	LINEAR	·	620 m	MPC · JPL
742778	2007 WE_{9}	—	October 9, 2007	Kitt Peak	Spacewatch	V	480 m	MPC · JPL
742779	2007 WO_{19}	—	November 18, 2007	Mount Lemmon	Mount Lemmon Survey	·	1.1 km	MPC · JPL
742780	2007 WP_{21}	—	November 2, 2007	Catalina	CSS	HNS	1.3 km	MPC · JPL
742781	2007 WK_{25}	—	November 5, 2007	Kitt Peak	Spacewatch	·	2.8 km	MPC · JPL
742782	2007 WV_{37}	—	November 4, 2007	Kitt Peak	Spacewatch	·	1.7 km	MPC · JPL
742783	2007 WP_{42}	—	November 18, 2007	Mount Lemmon	Mount Lemmon Survey	EUN	980 m	MPC · JPL
742784	2007 WC_{43}	—	October 20, 2007	Mount Lemmon	Mount Lemmon Survey	(12739)	1.3 km	MPC · JPL
742785	2007 WU_{43}	—	November 19, 2007	Mount Lemmon	Mount Lemmon Survey	·	990 m	MPC · JPL
742786	2007 WJ_{53}	—	November 2, 2007	Mount Lemmon	Mount Lemmon Survey	ADE	1.6 km	MPC · JPL
742787	2007 WS_{53}	—	November 2, 2007	Mount Lemmon	Mount Lemmon Survey	·	610 m	MPC · JPL
742788	2007 WJ_{59}	—	November 18, 2007	Mount Lemmon	Mount Lemmon Survey	·	1.1 km	MPC · JPL
742789	2007 WP_{60}	—	November 8, 2007	Kitt Peak	Spacewatch	·	1.5 km	MPC · JPL
742790	2007 WF_{62}	—	October 14, 2007	Mount Lemmon	Mount Lemmon Survey	·	830 m	MPC · JPL
742791	2007 WO_{64}	—	November 18, 2007	Mount Lemmon	Mount Lemmon Survey	·	1.4 km	MPC · JPL
742792	2007 WF_{65}	—	November 19, 2007	Mount Lemmon	Mount Lemmon Survey	·	590 m	MPC · JPL
742793	2007 WU_{66}	—	May 2, 2009	XuYi	PMO NEO Survey Program	·	550 m	MPC · JPL
742794	2007 WA_{67}	—	November 19, 2007	Mount Lemmon	Mount Lemmon Survey	·	610 m	MPC · JPL
742795	2007 WE_{67}	—	November 2, 2013	Mount Lemmon	Mount Lemmon Survey	·	2.5 km	MPC · JPL
742796	2007 WK_{67}	—	January 4, 2013	Cerro Tololo	D. E. Trilling, R. L. Allen	EUN	1.1 km	MPC · JPL
742797	2007 WX_{67}	—	November 6, 2007	Kitt Peak	Spacewatch	·	1.9 km	MPC · JPL
742798	2007 WE_{69}	—	July 1, 2017	Haleakala	Pan-STARRS 1	EOS	1.4 km	MPC · JPL
742799	2007 WF_{71}	—	October 10, 2007	Mount Lemmon	Mount Lemmon Survey	AGN	1.0 km	MPC · JPL
742800	2007 WJ_{71}	—	March 4, 2016	Haleakala	Pan-STARRS 1	·	2.5 km	MPC · JPL

== 742801–742900 ==
back to top

Designation			Discovery			Properties		Ref
Permanent	Provisional	Named after	Date	Site	Discoverer(s)	Category	Diam.	Ref
742801	2007 XL_{7}	—	November 5, 2007	Kitt Peak	Spacewatch	·	1.4 km	MPC · JPL
742802	2007 XG_{11}	—	October 17, 2007	Mount Lemmon	Mount Lemmon Survey	·	2.6 km	MPC · JPL
742803	2007 XO_{12}	—	December 4, 2007	Kitt Peak	Spacewatch	·	2.2 km	MPC · JPL
742804	2007 XM_{18}	—	December 7, 2007	Nogales	P. R. Holvorcem, M. Schwartz	PHO	880 m	MPC · JPL
742805	2007 XT_{22}	—	November 19, 2007	Mount Lemmon	Mount Lemmon Survey	·	1.4 km	MPC · JPL
742806	2007 XX_{24}	—	September 11, 2001	Socorro	LINEAR	T_{j} (2.98)	2.8 km	MPC · JPL
742807	2007 XT_{32}	—	November 17, 2007	Mount Lemmon	Mount Lemmon Survey	·	1.1 km	MPC · JPL
742808	2007 XB_{34}	—	November 5, 2007	Mount Lemmon	Mount Lemmon Survey	JUN	950 m	MPC · JPL
742809	2007 XG_{35}	—	November 17, 2007	Kitt Peak	Spacewatch	·	1.6 km	MPC · JPL
742810	2007 XQ_{39}	—	December 17, 2007	Mount Lemmon	Mount Lemmon Survey	HNS	1.3 km	MPC · JPL
742811	2007 XO_{55}	—	December 5, 2007	Mount Lemmon	Mount Lemmon Survey	·	1.2 km	MPC · JPL
742812	2007 XF_{56}	—	December 3, 2007	Catalina	CSS	·	1.3 km	MPC · JPL
742813	2007 XV_{60}	—	November 18, 2007	Kitt Peak	Spacewatch	V	500 m	MPC · JPL
742814	2007 XT_{61}	—	October 13, 2010	Mount Lemmon	Mount Lemmon Survey	·	600 m	MPC · JPL
742815	2007 XY_{61}	—	November 9, 2007	Kitt Peak	Spacewatch	·	540 m	MPC · JPL
742816	2007 XH_{62}	—	October 26, 2011	Haleakala	Pan-STARRS 1	·	910 m	MPC · JPL
742817	2007 XT_{62}	—	October 31, 2016	Mount Lemmon	Mount Lemmon Survey	HNS	1.1 km	MPC · JPL
742818	2007 XW_{62}	—	September 14, 2007	Mount Lemmon	Mount Lemmon Survey	·	2.4 km	MPC · JPL
742819	2007 XO_{64}	—	December 4, 2016	Mount Lemmon	Mount Lemmon Survey	·	2.0 km	MPC · JPL
742820	2007 XA_{65}	—	December 5, 2007	Kitt Peak	Spacewatch	·	3.0 km	MPC · JPL
742821	2007 XS_{65}	—	November 18, 2007	Kitt Peak	Spacewatch	·	480 m	MPC · JPL
742822	2007 XB_{66}	—	May 30, 2012	Mount Lemmon	Mount Lemmon Survey	H	490 m	MPC · JPL
742823	2007 XB_{68}	—	December 4, 2007	Mount Lemmon	Mount Lemmon Survey	·	2.3 km	MPC · JPL
742824	2007 XB_{70}	—	December 15, 2007	Kitt Peak	Spacewatch	·	1.9 km	MPC · JPL
742825	2007 YU_{1}	—	February 13, 2004	Kitt Peak	Spacewatch	·	1.9 km	MPC · JPL
742826	2007 YJ_{3}	—	December 17, 2007	Piszkéstető	K. Sárneczky	EUN	940 m	MPC · JPL
742827	2007 YJ_{6}	—	November 17, 2007	Mount Lemmon	Mount Lemmon Survey	EOS	1.4 km	MPC · JPL
742828	2007 YM_{6}	—	December 16, 2007	Mount Lemmon	Mount Lemmon Survey	·	1.1 km	MPC · JPL
742829	2007 YR_{10}	—	December 16, 2007	Mount Lemmon	Mount Lemmon Survey	·	980 m	MPC · JPL
742830	2007 YK_{15}	—	December 16, 2007	Kitt Peak	Spacewatch	·	1.6 km	MPC · JPL
742831	2007 YJ_{19}	—	December 16, 2007	Kitt Peak	Spacewatch	AEO	900 m	MPC · JPL
742832	2007 YL_{20}	—	December 16, 2007	Mount Lemmon	Mount Lemmon Survey	·	1.6 km	MPC · JPL
742833	2007 YE_{23}	—	November 12, 2007	Mount Lemmon	Mount Lemmon Survey	T_{j} (2.95)	3.0 km	MPC · JPL
742834	2007 YZ_{24}	—	December 3, 2007	Kitt Peak	Spacewatch	·	1.4 km	MPC · JPL
742835	2007 YW_{27}	—	November 7, 2007	Mount Lemmon	Mount Lemmon Survey	·	710 m	MPC · JPL
742836	2007 YX_{29}	—	December 29, 2007	Nogales	P. R. Holvorcem, M. Schwartz	·	1.1 km	MPC · JPL
742837	2007 YA_{52}	—	December 30, 2007	Kitt Peak	Spacewatch	·	570 m	MPC · JPL
742838	2007 YM_{57}	—	December 4, 2007	Kitt Peak	Spacewatch	·	2.3 km	MPC · JPL
742839	2007 YJ_{58}	—	November 11, 2007	Mount Lemmon	Mount Lemmon Survey	·	1.8 km	MPC · JPL
742840	2007 YC_{61}	—	February 22, 2004	Kitt Peak	Spacewatch	·	1.1 km	MPC · JPL
742841	2007 YM_{61}	—	August 26, 2007	Charleston	R. Holmes	·	2.2 km	MPC · JPL
742842	2007 YA_{65}	—	December 31, 2007	Mount Lemmon	Mount Lemmon Survey	·	1.1 km	MPC · JPL
742843	2007 YJ_{68}	—	December 30, 2007	Catalina	CSS	·	1.5 km	MPC · JPL
742844	2007 YL_{69}	—	December 30, 2007	Mount Lemmon	Mount Lemmon Survey	V	490 m	MPC · JPL
742845	2007 YT_{73}	—	December 30, 2007	Mount Lemmon	Mount Lemmon Survey	·	1.9 km	MPC · JPL
742846	2007 YE_{78}	—	December 18, 2007	Kitt Peak	Spacewatch	(2076)	590 m	MPC · JPL
742847	2007 YB_{79}	—	December 31, 2007	Mount Lemmon	Mount Lemmon Survey	·	2.9 km	MPC · JPL
742848	2007 YB_{80}	—	January 16, 2015	Haleakala	Pan-STARRS 1	·	500 m	MPC · JPL
742849	2007 YJ_{81}	—	December 31, 2007	Kitt Peak	Spacewatch	·	1.1 km	MPC · JPL
742850	2007 YE_{82}	—	March 21, 2012	Mount Lemmon	Mount Lemmon Survey	(2076)	610 m	MPC · JPL
742851	2007 YH_{82}	—	October 24, 2015	Mount Lemmon	Mount Lemmon Survey	·	1.0 km	MPC · JPL
742852	2007 YT_{82}	—	October 26, 2011	Haleakala	Pan-STARRS 1	·	1.6 km	MPC · JPL
742853	2007 YN_{83}	—	October 18, 2012	Mount Lemmon	Mount Lemmon Survey	·	3.1 km	MPC · JPL
742854	2007 YZ_{83}	—	January 14, 2018	Haleakala	Pan-STARRS 1	·	1.6 km	MPC · JPL
742855	2007 YA_{84}	—	October 23, 2012	Mount Lemmon	Mount Lemmon Survey	·	2.5 km	MPC · JPL
742856	2007 YP_{84}	—	September 16, 2012	Catalina	CSS	·	2.9 km	MPC · JPL
742857	2007 YT_{84}	—	November 8, 2007	Kitt Peak	Spacewatch	·	2.2 km	MPC · JPL
742858	2007 YX_{84}	—	April 29, 2009	Kitt Peak	Spacewatch	·	1.6 km	MPC · JPL
742859	2007 YE_{85}	—	August 21, 2006	Kitt Peak	Spacewatch	·	2.5 km	MPC · JPL
742860	2007 YE_{87}	—	October 26, 2011	Haleakala	Pan-STARRS 1	·	1.5 km	MPC · JPL
742861	2007 YJ_{87}	—	October 25, 2011	Haleakala	Pan-STARRS 1	·	1.7 km	MPC · JPL
742862	2007 YT_{88}	—	January 16, 2015	Haleakala	Pan-STARRS 1	·	3.2 km	MPC · JPL
742863	2007 YX_{89}	—	February 20, 2015	Haleakala	Pan-STARRS 1	·	2.7 km	MPC · JPL
742864	2007 YX_{90}	—	December 19, 2007	Mount Lemmon	Mount Lemmon Survey	MAR	820 m	MPC · JPL
742865	2007 YB_{91}	—	December 20, 2007	Kitt Peak	Spacewatch	URS	2.7 km	MPC · JPL
742866	2007 YK_{91}	—	December 28, 2007	Kitt Peak	Spacewatch	·	2.0 km	MPC · JPL
742867	2007 YJ_{94}	—	December 30, 2007	Kitt Peak	Spacewatch	·	590 m	MPC · JPL
742868	2007 YX_{95}	—	December 16, 2007	Kitt Peak	Spacewatch	·	590 m	MPC · JPL
742869	2007 YJ_{97}	—	December 31, 2007	Kitt Peak	Spacewatch	·	510 m	MPC · JPL
742870	2008 AC_{8}	—	December 31, 2007	Kitt Peak	Spacewatch	·	540 m	MPC · JPL
742871	2008 AT_{8}	—	January 10, 2008	Kitt Peak	Spacewatch	AEO	970 m	MPC · JPL
742872	2008 AF_{11}	—	January 10, 2008	Mount Lemmon	Mount Lemmon Survey	·	1.7 km	MPC · JPL
742873	2008 AA_{17}	—	January 10, 2008	Kitt Peak	Spacewatch	EUN	1.2 km	MPC · JPL
742874	2008 AZ_{19}	—	December 30, 2007	Kitt Peak	Spacewatch	·	2.1 km	MPC · JPL
742875	2008 AD_{30}	—	January 1, 2008	7300	W. K. Y. Yeung	·	1.4 km	MPC · JPL
742876	2008 AN_{36}	—	January 10, 2008	Kitt Peak	Spacewatch	·	920 m	MPC · JPL
742877	2008 AP_{49}	—	December 28, 2007	Kitt Peak	Spacewatch	MRX	800 m	MPC · JPL
742878	2008 AG_{51}	—	January 11, 2008	Kitt Peak	Spacewatch	(2076)	590 m	MPC · JPL
742879	2008 AU_{60}	—	December 18, 2007	Mount Lemmon	Mount Lemmon Survey	·	1.1 km	MPC · JPL
742880	2008 AW_{61}	—	December 30, 2007	Mount Lemmon	Mount Lemmon Survey	·	1.1 km	MPC · JPL
742881	2008 AW_{63}	—	January 11, 2008	Kitt Peak	Spacewatch	·	520 m	MPC · JPL
742882	2008 AO_{77}	—	January 12, 2008	Kitt Peak	Spacewatch	H	440 m	MPC · JPL
742883	2008 AR_{77}	—	January 12, 2008	Kitt Peak	Spacewatch	·	1.2 km	MPC · JPL
742884	2008 AB_{82}	—	January 13, 2008	Mount Lemmon	Mount Lemmon Survey	·	1.6 km	MPC · JPL
742885	2008 AU_{82}	—	December 18, 2007	Kitt Peak	Spacewatch	·	1.3 km	MPC · JPL
742886	2008 AU_{87}	—	December 15, 2007	Mount Lemmon	Mount Lemmon Survey	·	640 m	MPC · JPL
742887	2008 AR_{91}	—	December 30, 2007	Catalina	CSS	H	540 m	MPC · JPL
742888	2008 AO_{92}	—	January 14, 2008	Kitt Peak	Spacewatch	·	540 m	MPC · JPL
742889	2008 AZ_{93}	—	December 31, 2007	Kitt Peak	Spacewatch	·	750 m	MPC · JPL
742890	2008 AD_{100}	—	January 14, 2008	Kitt Peak	Spacewatch	·	1.8 km	MPC · JPL
742891	2008 AQ_{110}	—	December 18, 2007	Mount Lemmon	Mount Lemmon Survey	·	1.7 km	MPC · JPL
742892	2008 AC_{111}	—	January 15, 2008	Kitt Peak	Spacewatch	·	1.5 km	MPC · JPL
742893	2008 AG_{112}	—	November 19, 2007	Mount Lemmon	Mount Lemmon Survey	H	650 m	MPC · JPL
742894	2008 AV_{116}	—	January 13, 2008	Mount Lemmon	Mount Lemmon Survey	·	1.6 km	MPC · JPL
742895	2008 AW_{117}	—	January 10, 2008	Kitt Peak	Spacewatch	·	840 m	MPC · JPL
742896	2008 AM_{120}	—	January 6, 2008	Mauna Kea	P. A. Wiegert	(12739)	1.1 km	MPC · JPL
742897	2008 AU_{123}	—	January 14, 2008	Kitt Peak	Spacewatch	·	1.6 km	MPC · JPL
742898	2008 AU_{134}	—	January 16, 2008	Mount Lemmon	Mount Lemmon Survey	·	1.6 km	MPC · JPL
742899	2008 AN_{141}	—	September 19, 2011	Catalina	CSS	JUN	830 m	MPC · JPL
742900	2008 AJ_{142}	—	March 31, 2016	Haleakala	Pan-STARRS 1	·	850 m	MPC · JPL

== 742901–743000 ==
back to top

Designation			Discovery			Properties		Ref
Permanent	Provisional	Named after	Date	Site	Discoverer(s)	Category	Diam.	Ref
742901	2008 AV_{142}	—	February 23, 2012	Catalina	CSS	·	980 m	MPC · JPL
742902	2008 AC_{145}	—	January 14, 2008	Kitt Peak	Spacewatch	·	950 m	MPC · JPL
742903	2008 AB_{147}	—	April 22, 2009	Mount Lemmon	Mount Lemmon Survey	THM	1.8 km	MPC · JPL
742904	2008 AD_{147}	—	November 14, 2015	Mount Lemmon	Mount Lemmon Survey	·	1.4 km	MPC · JPL
742905	2008 AK_{147}	—	October 23, 2011	Haleakala	Pan-STARRS 1	·	1.7 km	MPC · JPL
742906	2008 AV_{148}	—	January 10, 2008	Mount Lemmon	Mount Lemmon Survey	GEF	990 m	MPC · JPL
742907	2008 AH_{150}	—	January 14, 2008	Kitt Peak	Spacewatch	·	1.0 km	MPC · JPL
742908	2008 AU_{151}	—	January 10, 2008	Kitt Peak	Spacewatch	MAS	590 m	MPC · JPL
742909	2008 AY_{151}	—	January 14, 2008	Kitt Peak	Spacewatch	·	1.4 km	MPC · JPL
742910	2008 AY_{152}	—	January 1, 2008	Mount Lemmon	Mount Lemmon Survey	·	1.4 km	MPC · JPL
742911	2008 AA_{153}	—	January 11, 2008	Kitt Peak	Spacewatch	·	1.3 km	MPC · JPL
742912	2008 BV_{1}	—	January 16, 2008	Kitt Peak	Spacewatch	·	610 m	MPC · JPL
742913	2008 BG_{2}	—	January 18, 2008	Kitt Peak	Spacewatch	T_{j} (2.93)	1.6 km	MPC · JPL
742914	2008 BY_{2}	—	January 21, 2008	Mount Lemmon	Mount Lemmon Survey	·	1.6 km	MPC · JPL
742915	2008 BK_{6}	—	January 11, 2008	Kitt Peak	Spacewatch	·	1.8 km	MPC · JPL
742916	2008 BS_{11}	—	January 18, 2008	Mount Lemmon	Mount Lemmon Survey	·	1.1 km	MPC · JPL
742917	2008 BK_{18}	—	January 30, 2008	Mount Lemmon	Mount Lemmon Survey	·	650 m	MPC · JPL
742918	2008 BD_{23}	—	January 31, 2008	Mount Lemmon	Mount Lemmon Survey	ADE	1.6 km	MPC · JPL
742919	2008 BK_{31}	—	January 30, 2008	Mount Lemmon	Mount Lemmon Survey	·	580 m	MPC · JPL
742920	2008 BT_{31}	—	January 10, 2008	Mount Lemmon	Mount Lemmon Survey	·	1.8 km	MPC · JPL
742921	2008 BS_{34}	—	January 30, 2008	Kitt Peak	Spacewatch	·	1.7 km	MPC · JPL
742922	2008 BC_{39}	—	January 14, 2008	Kitt Peak	Spacewatch	·	1.3 km	MPC · JPL
742923	2008 BB_{41}	—	January 18, 2008	Mount Lemmon	Mount Lemmon Survey	BAR	970 m	MPC · JPL
742924	2008 BH_{41}	—	January 12, 2008	Kitt Peak	Spacewatch	·	1.6 km	MPC · JPL
742925	2008 BH_{45}	—	January 31, 2008	Catalina	CSS	THB	2.6 km	MPC · JPL
742926	2008 BS_{55}	—	January 31, 2008	Mount Lemmon	Mount Lemmon Survey	·	1.3 km	MPC · JPL
742927	2008 BE_{56}	—	October 1, 2011	Mount Lemmon	Mount Lemmon Survey	·	3.0 km	MPC · JPL
742928	2008 BF_{56}	—	January 20, 2008	Kitt Peak	Spacewatch	·	1.0 km	MPC · JPL
742929	2008 BU_{56}	—	October 25, 2011	Kitt Peak	Spacewatch	·	1.5 km	MPC · JPL
742930	2008 BW_{56}	—	October 22, 2011	Mount Lemmon	Mount Lemmon Survey	·	1.3 km	MPC · JPL
742931	2008 BX_{56}	—	January 30, 2008	Kitt Peak	Spacewatch	JUN	830 m	MPC · JPL
742932	2008 BN_{57}	—	January 19, 2008	Kitt Peak	Spacewatch	·	1.1 km	MPC · JPL
742933	2008 BS_{58}	—	September 12, 2015	Haleakala	Pan-STARRS 1	·	1.2 km	MPC · JPL
742934	2008 CV_{3}	—	January 14, 2008	Kitt Peak	Spacewatch	·	2.4 km	MPC · JPL
742935	2008 CL_{6}	—	December 16, 2007	Mount Lemmon	Mount Lemmon Survey	·	560 m	MPC · JPL
742936	2008 CL_{15}	—	February 3, 2008	Kitt Peak	Spacewatch	·	1.7 km	MPC · JPL
742937	2008 CW_{23}	—	February 1, 2008	Kitt Peak	Spacewatch	·	1.7 km	MPC · JPL
742938	2008 CY_{23}	—	January 12, 2008	Mount Lemmon	Mount Lemmon Survey	·	1.6 km	MPC · JPL
742939	2008 CR_{29}	—	January 11, 2008	Kitt Peak	Spacewatch	·	570 m	MPC · JPL
742940	2008 CT_{34}	—	February 2, 2008	Kitt Peak	Spacewatch	·	860 m	MPC · JPL
742941	2008 CZ_{38}	—	January 10, 2008	Mount Lemmon	Mount Lemmon Survey	MIS	2.2 km	MPC · JPL
742942	2008 CJ_{39}	—	January 10, 2008	Mount Lemmon	Mount Lemmon Survey	·	880 m	MPC · JPL
742943	2008 CP_{42}	—	February 2, 2008	Kitt Peak	Spacewatch	·	750 m	MPC · JPL
742944	2008 CQ_{54}	—	January 11, 2008	Mount Lemmon	Mount Lemmon Survey	·	1.7 km	MPC · JPL
742945	2008 CN_{57}	—	February 7, 2008	Mount Lemmon	Mount Lemmon Survey	·	1.6 km	MPC · JPL
742946	2008 CY_{57}	—	December 30, 2007	Mount Lemmon	Mount Lemmon Survey	GAL	1.4 km	MPC · JPL
742947	2008 CA_{61}	—	February 7, 2008	Mount Lemmon	Mount Lemmon Survey	·	610 m	MPC · JPL
742948	2008 CK_{61}	—	February 7, 2008	Mount Lemmon	Mount Lemmon Survey	·	1.0 km	MPC · JPL
742949	2008 CL_{65}	—	February 8, 2008	Mount Lemmon	Mount Lemmon Survey	·	1.4 km	MPC · JPL
742950	2008 CU_{65}	—	February 8, 2008	Mount Lemmon	Mount Lemmon Survey	·	1.2 km	MPC · JPL
742951	2008 CP_{68}	—	January 30, 2008	Mount Lemmon	Mount Lemmon Survey	·	1.4 km	MPC · JPL
742952	2008 CV_{68}	—	November 7, 2007	Mount Lemmon	Mount Lemmon Survey	·	1.2 km	MPC · JPL
742953	2008 CV_{72}	—	January 15, 2008	Mount Lemmon	Mount Lemmon Survey	·	1.1 km	MPC · JPL
742954	2008 CS_{74}	—	February 9, 2008	Bergisch Gladbach	W. Bickel	·	1.4 km	MPC · JPL
742955	2008 CD_{83}	—	November 18, 2003	Kitt Peak	Spacewatch	·	800 m	MPC · JPL
742956	2008 CH_{84}	—	February 7, 2008	Mount Lemmon	Mount Lemmon Survey	·	1.3 km	MPC · JPL
742957	2008 CW_{85}	—	February 7, 2008	Mount Lemmon	Mount Lemmon Survey	·	810 m	MPC · JPL
742958	2008 CZ_{86}	—	February 7, 2008	Mount Lemmon	Mount Lemmon Survey	·	540 m	MPC · JPL
742959	2008 CX_{90}	—	January 30, 2008	Kitt Peak	Spacewatch	·	1.1 km	MPC · JPL
742960	2008 CE_{91}	—	January 1, 2008	Mount Lemmon	Mount Lemmon Survey	·	1.7 km	MPC · JPL
742961	2008 CE_{92}	—	February 8, 2008	Kitt Peak	Spacewatch	·	660 m	MPC · JPL
742962	2008 CN_{92}	—	February 8, 2008	Kitt Peak	Spacewatch	·	1.6 km	MPC · JPL
742963	2008 CX_{101}	—	February 9, 2008	Mount Lemmon	Mount Lemmon Survey	·	1.4 km	MPC · JPL
742964	2008 CO_{108}	—	January 10, 2008	Mount Lemmon	Mount Lemmon Survey	·	720 m	MPC · JPL
742965	2008 CR_{111}	—	February 10, 2008	Kitt Peak	Spacewatch	·	1.3 km	MPC · JPL
742966	2008 CQ_{123}	—	February 7, 2008	Mount Lemmon	Mount Lemmon Survey	·	1.4 km	MPC · JPL
742967	2008 CH_{138}	—	February 8, 2008	Kitt Peak	Spacewatch	·	540 m	MPC · JPL
742968	2008 CV_{158}	—	February 9, 2008	Kitt Peak	Spacewatch	·	770 m	MPC · JPL
742969	2008 CT_{162}	—	February 10, 2008	Kitt Peak	Spacewatch	·	1.3 km	MPC · JPL
742970	2008 CB_{166}	—	February 10, 2008	Mount Lemmon	Mount Lemmon Survey	·	1.4 km	MPC · JPL
742971	2008 CQ_{168}	—	February 12, 2008	Mount Lemmon	Mount Lemmon Survey	PHO	680 m	MPC · JPL
742972	2008 CB_{172}	—	February 12, 2008	Mount Lemmon	Mount Lemmon Survey	·	1.5 km	MPC · JPL
742973	2008 CC_{182}	—	February 11, 2008	Mount Lemmon	Mount Lemmon Survey	·	1.7 km	MPC · JPL
742974	2008 CP_{185}	—	February 1, 2008	Catalina	CSS	JUN	920 m	MPC · JPL
742975	2008 CE_{186}	—	February 2, 2008	Catalina	CSS	JUN	910 m	MPC · JPL
742976	2008 CC_{191}	—	February 2, 2008	Kitt Peak	Spacewatch	·	1.6 km	MPC · JPL
742977	2008 CB_{201}	—	February 12, 2008	Kitt Peak	Spacewatch	·	1.2 km	MPC · JPL
742978	2008 CR_{209}	—	February 11, 2008	Mount Lemmon	Mount Lemmon Survey	·	1.6 km	MPC · JPL
742979	2008 CV_{211}	—	February 7, 2008	Kitt Peak	Spacewatch	AEO	1.1 km	MPC · JPL
742980	2008 CW_{217}	—	February 3, 2008	Mount Lemmon	Mount Lemmon Survey	LIX	2.6 km	MPC · JPL
742981	2008 CS_{219}	—	June 20, 2013	Haleakala	Pan-STARRS 1	V	530 m	MPC · JPL
742982	2008 CP_{220}	—	February 2, 2008	Kitt Peak	Spacewatch	PHO	720 m	MPC · JPL
742983	2008 CB_{221}	—	February 13, 2008	Mount Lemmon	Mount Lemmon Survey	·	1.8 km	MPC · JPL
742984	2008 CL_{221}	—	December 5, 2010	Mount Lemmon	Mount Lemmon Survey	·	890 m	MPC · JPL
742985	2008 CO_{221}	—	February 10, 2008	Kitt Peak	Spacewatch	(2076)	720 m	MPC · JPL
742986	2008 CV_{221}	—	November 8, 2010	Xingming	X. Gao, Z. Xu	·	570 m	MPC · JPL
742987	2008 CQ_{222}	—	February 13, 2008	Mount Lemmon	Mount Lemmon Survey	·	850 m	MPC · JPL
742988	2008 CA_{223}	—	February 7, 2008	Kitt Peak	Spacewatch	·	810 m	MPC · JPL
742989	2008 CC_{223}	—	February 10, 2008	Kitt Peak	Spacewatch	EUN	880 m	MPC · JPL
742990	2008 CW_{223}	—	November 2, 2010	Kitt Peak	Spacewatch	·	660 m	MPC · JPL
742991	2008 CN_{225}	—	September 9, 2015	Haleakala	Pan-STARRS 1	·	1.5 km	MPC · JPL
742992	2008 CQ_{225}	—	February 3, 2008	Catalina	CSS	T_{j} (2.99)	4.1 km	MPC · JPL
742993	2008 CK_{227}	—	January 13, 2008	Kitt Peak	Spacewatch	·	1.6 km	MPC · JPL
742994	2008 CR_{227}	—	May 1, 2016	Haleakala	Pan-STARRS 1	·	820 m	MPC · JPL
742995	2008 CK_{228}	—	December 25, 2011	Kitt Peak	Spacewatch	·	1.0 km	MPC · JPL
742996	2008 CO_{228}	—	January 1, 2012	Mount Lemmon	Mount Lemmon Survey	·	1.2 km	MPC · JPL
742997	2008 CZ_{233}	—	November 8, 2010	Mount Lemmon	Mount Lemmon Survey	·	1.0 km	MPC · JPL
742998	2008 CG_{248}	—	February 11, 2008	Mount Lemmon	Mount Lemmon Survey	·	1.6 km	MPC · JPL
742999	2008 DM	—	February 11, 2008	Mount Lemmon	Mount Lemmon Survey	VER	2.5 km	MPC · JPL
743000	2008 DZ_{1}	—	January 11, 2008	Kitt Peak	Spacewatch	·	1.2 km	MPC · JPL

back to top
