= List of minor planets: 882001–883000 =

The following is a partial list of minor planets, running from minor-planet number 882001 through 883000, inclusive. The primary data for this and other partial lists is based on JPL's "Small-Body Orbital Elements" and data available from the Minor Planet Center. Critical list information is also provided by the MPC, unless otherwise specified from Lowell Observatory. A detailed description of the table's columns and additional sources are given on the main page including a complete list of every page in this series, and a statistical break-up on the dynamical classification of minor planets.

Also see the summary list of all named bodies in numerical and alphabetical order, and the corresponding naming citations for the number range of this particular list. New namings may only be added to this list after official publication, as the preannouncement of names is condemned by the Working Group for Small Bodies Nomenclature of the International Astronomical Union.

| Near-Earth obj. | MBA (inner) | MBA (outer) | Centaur |
| Mars-crosser | MBA (middle) | Jupiter trojan | Trans-Neptunian obj. |
| Unclassified |

== 882001–882100 ==
| Designation | | | Discovery | | | Properties | | Ref |
| Permanent | Provisional | Named after | Date | Site | Discoverer(s) | Category | Diam. | Ref |
|---|---|---|---|---|---|---|---|---|
| 882001 | 2015 TN_{16} | — | September 12, 2015 | Haleakala | Pan-STARRS 1 | · | 1.6 km | MPC · JPL |
| 882002 | 2015 TD_{19} | — | September 3, 2010 | Mount Lemmon | Mount Lemmon Survey | · | 1.4 km | MPC · JPL |
| 882003 | 2015 TS_{23} | — | October 8, 2015 | Haleakala | Pan-STARRS 1 | · | 1.1 km | MPC · JPL |
| 882004 | 2015 TH_{26} | — | April 17, 2013 | Cerro Tololo-DECam | DECam | · | 1.3 km | MPC · JPL |
| 882005 | 2015 TG_{34} | — | July 19, 2015 | Haleakala | Pan-STARRS 1 | · | 1.2 km | MPC · JPL |
| 882006 | 2015 TV_{34} | — | July 19, 2015 | Haleakala | Pan-STARRS 1 | · | 1.3 km | MPC · JPL |
| 882007 | 2015 TS_{36} | — | October 23, 2011 | Kitt Peak | Spacewatch | · | 870 m | MPC · JPL |
| 882008 | 2015 TE_{37} | — | July 19, 2015 | Haleakala | Pan-STARRS 1 | · | 1.2 km | MPC · JPL |
| 882009 | 2015 TV_{42} | — | September 8, 2015 | Haleakala | Pan-STARRS 1 | MAR | 700 m | MPC · JPL |
| 882010 | 2015 TV_{51} | — | July 25, 2015 | Haleakala | Pan-STARRS 1 | · | 1.7 km | MPC · JPL |
| 882011 | 2015 TR_{52} | — | May 6, 2014 | Haleakala | Pan-STARRS 1 | · | 1.3 km | MPC · JPL |
| 882012 | 2015 TE_{64} | — | October 8, 2015 | Haleakala | Pan-STARRS 1 | · | 1.2 km | MPC · JPL |
| 882013 | 2015 TV_{67} | — | October 8, 2015 | Haleakala | Pan-STARRS 1 | · | 1.5 km | MPC · JPL |
| 882014 | 2015 TH_{72} | — | October 23, 2006 | Kitt Peak | Spacewatch | · | 1.2 km | MPC · JPL |
| 882015 | 2015 TH_{74} | — | October 8, 2015 | Haleakala | Pan-STARRS 1 | · | 1.7 km | MPC · JPL |
| 882016 | 2015 TJ_{76} | — | October 8, 2015 | Haleakala | Pan-STARRS 1 | · | 440 m | MPC · JPL |
| 882017 | 2015 TS_{78} | — | November 14, 2010 | Mount Lemmon | Mount Lemmon Survey | · | 1.2 km | MPC · JPL |
| 882018 | 2015 TK_{81} | — | October 5, 2005 | Mount Lemmon | Mount Lemmon Survey | · | 1.1 km | MPC · JPL |
| 882019 | 2015 TA_{92} | — | October 26, 2011 | Haleakala | Pan-STARRS 1 | · | 610 m | MPC · JPL |
| 882020 | 2015 TB_{97} | — | October 29, 2008 | Kitt Peak | Spacewatch | · | 720 m | MPC · JPL |
| 882021 | 2015 TH_{100} | — | October 8, 2015 | Mount Lemmon | Mount Lemmon Survey | · | 1.2 km | MPC · JPL |
| 882022 | 2015 TT_{101} | — | September 9, 2015 | Haleakala | Pan-STARRS 1 | · | 860 m | MPC · JPL |
| 882023 | 2015 TU_{104} | — | August 28, 2014 | Haleakala | Pan-STARRS 1 | T_{j} (2.99) · 3:2 | 4.1 km | MPC · JPL |
| 882024 | 2015 TT_{105} | — | January 6, 2012 | Kitt Peak | Spacewatch | · | 920 m | MPC · JPL |
| 882025 | 2015 TX_{106} | — | October 8, 2015 | Haleakala | Pan-STARRS 1 | · | 1.4 km | MPC · JPL |
| 882026 | 2015 TS_{112} | — | October 8, 2015 | Haleakala | Pan-STARRS 1 | · | 1 km | MPC · JPL |
| 882027 | 2015 TV_{114} | — | November 4, 2007 | Mount Lemmon | Mount Lemmon Survey | · | 680 m | MPC · JPL |
| 882028 | 2015 TF_{115} | — | October 8, 2015 | Haleakala | Pan-STARRS 1 | · | 880 m | MPC · JPL |
| 882029 | 2015 TX_{115} | — | October 8, 2015 | Haleakala | Pan-STARRS 1 | · | 1.2 km | MPC · JPL |
| 882030 | 2015 TR_{119} | — | July 4, 2014 | Haleakala | Pan-STARRS 1 | · | 1.3 km | MPC · JPL |
| 882031 | 2015 TZ_{120} | — | August 3, 2014 | Haleakala | Pan-STARRS 1 | · | 1.4 km | MPC · JPL |
| 882032 | 2015 TV_{123} | — | October 8, 2015 | Haleakala | Pan-STARRS 1 | · | 1.3 km | MPC · JPL |
| 882033 | 2015 TS_{125} | — | September 9, 2015 | Haleakala | Pan-STARRS 1 | · | 540 m | MPC · JPL |
| 882034 | 2015 TU_{126} | — | September 12, 2015 | Haleakala | Pan-STARRS 1 | · | 1.6 km | MPC · JPL |
| 882035 | 2015 TS_{127} | — | September 12, 2015 | Haleakala | Pan-STARRS 1 | · | 980 m | MPC · JPL |
| 882036 | 2015 TN_{129} | — | September 11, 2015 | Haleakala | Pan-STARRS 1 | · | 1.2 km | MPC · JPL |
| 882037 | 2015 TK_{137} | — | March 13, 2012 | Mount Lemmon | Mount Lemmon Survey | · | 1.2 km | MPC · JPL |
| 882038 | 2015 TC_{139} | — | October 8, 2015 | Haleakala | Pan-STARRS 1 | · | 1.6 km | MPC · JPL |
| 882039 | 2015 TR_{145} | — | July 23, 2015 | Haleakala | Pan-STARRS 1 | · | 380 m | MPC · JPL |
| 882040 | 2015 TZ_{145} | — | September 15, 1993 | La Silla | H. Debehogne, E. W. Elst | · | 1.3 km | MPC · JPL |
| 882041 | 2015 TU_{150} | — | September 10, 2015 | Haleakala | Pan-STARRS 1 | · | 1.0 km | MPC · JPL |
| 882042 | 2015 TQ_{153} | — | August 24, 2011 | Haleakala | Pan-STARRS 1 | · | 800 m | MPC · JPL |
| 882043 | 2015 TG_{157} | — | December 11, 2012 | Mount Lemmon | Mount Lemmon Survey | · | 420 m | MPC · JPL |
| 882044 | 2015 TX_{157} | — | June 28, 2011 | Mount Lemmon | Mount Lemmon Survey | · | 700 m | MPC · JPL |
| 882045 | 2015 TH_{160} | — | April 5, 2014 | Haleakala | Pan-STARRS 1 | · | 1.0 km | MPC · JPL |
| 882046 | 2015 TJ_{162} | — | June 28, 2015 | Haleakala | Pan-STARRS 1 | · | 1.5 km | MPC · JPL |
| 882047 | 2015 TX_{163} | — | June 30, 2015 | Haleakala | Pan-STARRS 1 | · | 1.2 km | MPC · JPL |
| 882048 | 2015 TP_{172} | — | July 29, 2005 | Palomar | NEAT | · | 510 m | MPC · JPL |
| 882049 | 2015 TH_{174} | — | October 9, 2015 | Haleakala | Pan-STARRS 1 | · | 1.5 km | MPC · JPL |
| 882050 | 2015 TV_{192} | — | October 1, 2015 | Kitt Peak | Spacewatch | · | 1.4 km | MPC · JPL |
| 882051 | 2015 TD_{195} | — | March 22, 2014 | Mount Lemmon | Mount Lemmon Survey | H | 440 m | MPC · JPL |
| 882052 | 2015 TR_{198} | — | October 9, 2015 | XuYi | PMO NEO Survey Program | T_{j} (2.92) | 2.7 km | MPC · JPL |
| 882053 | 2015 TO_{199} | — | September 8, 2015 | XuYi | PMO NEO Survey Program | JUN | 510 m | MPC · JPL |
| 882054 | 2015 TR_{207} | — | October 10, 2015 | Space Surveillance | Space Surveillance Telescope | · | 800 m | MPC · JPL |
| 882055 | 2015 TC_{208} | — | October 11, 2015 | Mount Lemmon | Mount Lemmon Survey | · | 1.2 km | MPC · JPL |
| 882056 | 2015 TG_{212} | — | July 23, 2015 | Haleakala | Pan-STARRS 1 | · | 1.4 km | MPC · JPL |
| 882057 | 2015 TN_{212} | — | September 25, 2015 | Mount Lemmon | Mount Lemmon Survey | HOF | 1.8 km | MPC · JPL |
| 882058 | 2015 TQ_{212} | — | September 6, 2015 | Haleakala | Pan-STARRS 1 | · | 950 m | MPC · JPL |
| 882059 | 2015 TX_{218} | — | September 2, 2010 | Mount Lemmon | Mount Lemmon Survey | · | 1.1 km | MPC · JPL |
| 882060 | 2015 TK_{232} | — | May 9, 2010 | WISE | WISE | · | 1.7 km | MPC · JPL |
| 882061 | 2015 TK_{236} | — | October 11, 2015 | Mount Lemmon | Mount Lemmon Survey | · | 1.4 km | MPC · JPL |
| 882062 | 2015 TP_{248} | — | September 12, 2015 | Haleakala | Pan-STARRS 1 | · | 1.3 km | MPC · JPL |
| 882063 | 2015 TG_{249} | — | October 10, 2015 | Haleakala | Pan-STARRS 1 | · | 1.3 km | MPC · JPL |
| 882064 | 2015 TZ_{262} | — | October 14, 2010 | Mount Lemmon | Mount Lemmon Survey | EOS | 1.2 km | MPC · JPL |
| 882065 | 2015 TT_{264} | — | July 23, 2015 | Haleakala | Pan-STARRS 1 | (18466) | 1.9 km | MPC · JPL |
| 882066 | 2015 TV_{281} | — | August 12, 2015 | Haleakala | Pan-STARRS 1 | · | 1.4 km | MPC · JPL |
| 882067 | 2015 TG_{287} | — | October 11, 2007 | Kitt Peak | Spacewatch | · | 650 m | MPC · JPL |
| 882068 | 2015 TM_{288} | — | September 12, 2015 | Haleakala | Pan-STARRS 1 | WIT | 660 m | MPC · JPL |
| 882069 | 2015 TO_{290} | — | September 6, 2015 | Haleakala | Pan-STARRS 1 | · | 390 m | MPC · JPL |
| 882070 | 2015 TO_{298} | — | October 12, 2015 | Space Surveillance | Space Surveillance Telescope | · | 770 m | MPC · JPL |
| 882071 | 2015 TH_{305} | — | September 12, 2015 | Haleakala | Pan-STARRS 1 | · | 1.4 km | MPC · JPL |
| 882072 | 2015 TT_{308} | — | May 23, 2014 | Mount Lemmon | Mount Lemmon Survey | · | 970 m | MPC · JPL |
| 882073 | 2015 TG_{311} | — | October 12, 2015 | Haleakala | Pan-STARRS 1 | · | 1.6 km | MPC · JPL |
| 882074 | 2015 TR_{311} | — | October 12, 2015 | Haleakala | Pan-STARRS 1 | · | 760 m | MPC · JPL |
| 882075 | 2015 TK_{314} | — | October 3, 2010 | Kitt Peak | Spacewatch | · | 1.4 km | MPC · JPL |
| 882076 | 2015 TO_{323} | — | September 11, 2010 | Kitt Peak | Spacewatch | · | 1.4 km | MPC · JPL |
| 882077 | 2015 TE_{325} | — | September 23, 2015 | Haleakala | Pan-STARRS 1 | · | 630 m | MPC · JPL |
| 882078 | 2015 TX_{333} | — | October 13, 2015 | Haleakala | Pan-STARRS 1 | · | 1.5 km | MPC · JPL |
| 882079 | 2015 TQ_{337} | — | October 15, 2015 | Haleakala | Pan-STARRS 1 | · | 1.4 km | MPC · JPL |
| 882080 | 2015 TG_{339} | — | August 3, 2015 | Haleakala | Pan-STARRS 1 | · | 2.2 km | MPC · JPL |
| 882081 | 2015 TX_{341} | — | July 26, 2015 | Haleakala | Pan-STARRS 1 | · | 1.6 km | MPC · JPL |
| 882082 | 2015 TW_{343} | — | October 2, 2010 | Kitt Peak | Spacewatch | critical | 1.1 km | MPC · JPL |
| 882083 | 2015 TE_{349} | — | September 9, 2015 | Haleakala | Pan-STARRS 1 | · | 1.3 km | MPC · JPL |
| 882084 | 2015 TG_{352} | — | October 1, 2015 | Mount Lemmon | Mount Lemmon Survey | H | 330 m | MPC · JPL |
| 882085 | 2015 TX_{352} | — | October 12, 2015 | Haleakala | Pan-STARRS 1 | H | 370 m | MPC · JPL |
| 882086 | 2015 TV_{355} | — | October 9, 2015 | Haleakala | Pan-STARRS 1 | · | 1.3 km | MPC · JPL |
| 882087 | 2015 TC_{356} | — | October 9, 2015 | Haleakala | Pan-STARRS 1 | KON | 1.6 km | MPC · JPL |
| 882088 | 2015 TK_{359} | — | March 2, 2011 | Mount Lemmon | Mount Lemmon Survey | · | 1.7 km | MPC · JPL |
| 882089 | 2015 TZ_{359} | — | October 10, 2015 | Haleakala | Pan-STARRS 1 | · | 1.2 km | MPC · JPL |
| 882090 | 2015 TU_{365} | — | September 9, 2015 | Haleakala | Pan-STARRS 1 | · | 1.5 km | MPC · JPL |
| 882091 | 2015 TT_{370} | — | October 26, 2011 | Haleakala | Pan-STARRS 1 | · | 1.2 km | MPC · JPL |
| 882092 | 2015 TJ_{378} | — | September 23, 2005 | Kitt Peak | Spacewatch | · | 1.4 km | MPC · JPL |
| 882093 | 2015 TX_{384} | — | May 3, 2014 | Haleakala | Pan-STARRS 1 | · | 1.4 km | MPC · JPL |
| 882094 | 2015 TK_{386} | — | October 11, 2010 | Mayhill-ISON | L. Elenin | critical | 1.4 km | MPC · JPL |
| 882095 | 2015 TK_{387} | — | October 10, 2015 | Haleakala | Pan-STARRS 1 | · | 500 m | MPC · JPL |
| 882096 | 2015 TC_{394} | — | October 10, 2015 | Haleakala | Pan-STARRS 1 | · | 1.6 km | MPC · JPL |
| 882097 | 2015 TV_{395} | — | October 4, 2015 | Mount Lemmon | Mount Lemmon Survey | · | 1.0 km | MPC · JPL |
| 882098 | 2015 TM_{399} | — | October 15, 2015 | Haleakala | Pan-STARRS 1 | HOF | 1.9 km | MPC · JPL |
| 882099 | 2015 TD_{401} | — | March 8, 2008 | Kitt Peak | Spacewatch | · | 1.5 km | MPC · JPL |
| 882100 | 2015 TH_{402} | — | October 9, 2015 | Haleakala | Pan-STARRS 1 | AST | 1.1 km | MPC · JPL |

== 882101–882200 ==
back to top

| Designation | | | Discovery | | | Properties | | Ref |
| Permanent | Provisional | Named after | Date | Site | Discoverer(s) | Category | Diam. | Ref |
|---|---|---|---|---|---|---|---|---|
| 882101 | 2015 TR_{402} | — | October 12, 2015 | Haleakala | Pan-STARRS 1 | · | 1.1 km | MPC · JPL |
| 882102 | 2015 TB_{405} | — | October 9, 2015 | Haleakala | Pan-STARRS 1 | · | 1.4 km | MPC · JPL |
| 882103 | 2015 TP_{415} | — | October 10, 2015 | Haleakala | Pan-STARRS 1 | THM | 1.7 km | MPC · JPL |
| 882104 | 2015 TD_{418} | — | October 8, 2015 | Haleakala | Pan-STARRS 1 | · | 2.0 km | MPC · JPL |
| 882105 | 2015 TK_{428} | — | October 13, 2015 | Haleakala | Pan-STARRS 1 | · | 1.5 km | MPC · JPL |
| 882106 | 2015 TS_{429} | — | October 10, 2015 | Haleakala | Pan-STARRS 1 | · | 1.5 km | MPC · JPL |
| 882107 | 2015 TE_{431} | — | October 9, 2015 | Haleakala | Pan-STARRS 1 | TEL | 730 m | MPC · JPL |
| 882108 | 2015 TC_{432} | — | October 2, 2015 | Haleakala | Pan-STARRS 1 | H | 410 m | MPC · JPL |
| 882109 | 2015 TZ_{433} | — | October 2, 2015 | Mount Lemmon | Mount Lemmon Survey | · | 1.3 km | MPC · JPL |
| 882110 | 2015 TT_{437} | — | October 13, 2015 | Mount Lemmon | Mount Lemmon Survey | · | 390 m | MPC · JPL |
| 882111 | 2015 TD_{441} | — | October 10, 2015 | Haleakala | Pan-STARRS 1 | AGN | 900 m | MPC · JPL |
| 882112 | 2015 TR_{441} | — | October 15, 2015 | Haleakala | Pan-STARRS 1 | EUN | 690 m | MPC · JPL |
| 882113 | 2015 TY_{443} | — | October 10, 2015 | Haleakala | Pan-STARRS 1 | · | 790 m | MPC · JPL |
| 882114 | 2015 TJ_{446} | — | October 9, 2015 | Haleakala | Pan-STARRS 1 | · | 1.0 km | MPC · JPL |
| 882115 | 2015 TX_{451} | — | October 9, 2015 | Haleakala | Pan-STARRS 1 | · | 1.4 km | MPC · JPL |
| 882116 | 2015 TL_{463} | — | October 9, 2015 | Haleakala | Pan-STARRS 1 | EOS | 1.2 km | MPC · JPL |
| 882117 | 2015 TH_{465} | — | October 15, 2015 | Haleakala | Pan-STARRS 1 | · | 1.3 km | MPC · JPL |
| 882118 | 2015 TE_{467} | — | October 12, 2015 | Haleakala | Pan-STARRS 1 | · | 1.6 km | MPC · JPL |
| 882119 | 2015 TQ_{477} | — | October 9, 2015 | Haleakala | Pan-STARRS 1 | HOF | 1.8 km | MPC · JPL |
| 882120 | 2015 TW_{489} | — | October 11, 2015 | Mount Lemmon | Mount Lemmon Survey | · | 1.5 km | MPC · JPL |
| 882121 | 2015 UW_{2} | — | August 27, 2011 | Haleakala | Pan-STARRS 1 | · | 810 m | MPC · JPL |
| 882122 | 2015 UZ_{2} | — | October 16, 2015 | Mount Lemmon | Mount Lemmon Survey | · | 1.8 km | MPC · JPL |
| 882123 | 2015 UN_{5} | — | September 12, 2015 | Haleakala | Pan-STARRS 1 | · | 400 m | MPC · JPL |
| 882124 | 2015 US_{10} | — | October 5, 2004 | Kitt Peak | Spacewatch | THM | 1.6 km | MPC · JPL |
| 882125 | 2015 UL_{16} | — | October 18, 2015 | Haleakala | Pan-STARRS 1 | BRA | 1.1 km | MPC · JPL |
| 882126 | 2015 UC_{35} | — | September 9, 2015 | Haleakala | Pan-STARRS 1 | · | 920 m | MPC · JPL |
| 882127 | 2015 UL_{37} | — | October 3, 2006 | Mount Lemmon | Mount Lemmon Survey | · | 1.2 km | MPC · JPL |
| 882128 | 2015 UE_{41} | — | August 12, 2015 | Haleakala | Pan-STARRS 1 | KOR | 1.1 km | MPC · JPL |
| 882129 | 2015 UB_{42} | — | October 8, 2015 | Haleakala | Pan-STARRS 1 | · | 1.4 km | MPC · JPL |
| 882130 | 2015 UB_{48} | — | October 18, 2015 | Haleakala | Pan-STARRS 1 | · | 1.5 km | MPC · JPL |
| 882131 | 2015 UQ_{53} | — | October 11, 2010 | Piszkés-tető | K. Sárneczky, G. Mező | · | 630 m | MPC · JPL |
| 882132 | 2015 UL_{59} | — | October 19, 2015 | Haleakala | Pan-STARRS 1 | · | 950 m | MPC · JPL |
| 882133 | 2015 UV_{66} | — | November 17, 2009 | Kitt Peak | Spacewatch | · | 640 m | MPC · JPL |
| 882134 | 2015 UP_{67} | — | July 25, 2015 | Haleakala | Pan-STARRS 1 | H | 430 m | MPC · JPL |
| 882135 | 2015 UT_{72} | — | October 8, 2015 | Oukaïmeden | M. Ory | · | 1.4 km | MPC · JPL |
| 882136 | 2015 UH_{81} | — | August 12, 2015 | Haleakala | Pan-STARRS 1 | · | 1.7 km | MPC · JPL |
| 882137 | 2015 UY_{84} | — | April 14, 2007 | Kitt Peak | Spacewatch | H | 380 m | MPC · JPL |
| 882138 | 2015 UY_{90} | — | October 19, 2015 | Haleakala | Pan-STARRS 1 | · | 1.4 km | MPC · JPL |
| 882139 | 2015 UD_{92} | — | October 24, 2015 | Haleakala | Pan-STARRS 1 | · | 1.0 km | MPC · JPL |
| 882140 | 2015 UV_{92} | — | October 21, 2015 | Haleakala | Pan-STARRS 1 | EUN | 700 m | MPC · JPL |
| 882141 | 2015 UE_{93} | — | October 21, 2015 | Haleakala | Pan-STARRS 1 | · | 810 m | MPC · JPL |
| 882142 | 2015 UL_{95} | — | October 16, 2015 | Kitt Peak | Spacewatch | · | 1.3 km | MPC · JPL |
| 882143 | 2015 UR_{95} | — | October 19, 2015 | Haleakala | Pan-STARRS 1 | · | 1.5 km | MPC · JPL |
| 882144 | 2015 UK_{99} | — | October 18, 2015 | Haleakala | Pan-STARRS 1 | · | 1.5 km | MPC · JPL |
| 882145 | 2015 UP_{99} | — | October 24, 2015 | Haleakala | Pan-STARRS 1 | H | 300 m | MPC · JPL |
| 882146 | 2015 UU_{113} | — | October 23, 2015 | Mount Lemmon | Mount Lemmon Survey | · | 1.3 km | MPC · JPL |
| 882147 | 2015 UG_{114} | — | October 18, 2015 | Haleakala | Pan-STARRS 1 | · | 1.1 km | MPC · JPL |
| 882148 | 2015 VS | — | September 9, 2015 | Haleakala | Pan-STARRS 1 | H | 500 m | MPC · JPL |
| 882149 | 2015 VK_{2} | — | October 25, 2013 | Haleakala | Pan-STARRS 1 | · | 370 m | MPC · JPL |
| 882150 | 2015 VE_{10} | — | October 1, 2015 | Mount Lemmon | Mount Lemmon Survey | · | 1.6 km | MPC · JPL |
| 882151 | 2015 VN_{10} | — | September 11, 2015 | Haleakala | Pan-STARRS 1 | · | 1.4 km | MPC · JPL |
| 882152 | 2015 VU_{10} | — | October 7, 2005 | Kitt Peak | Spacewatch | · | 1.0 km | MPC · JPL |
| 882153 | 2015 VQ_{13} | — | August 26, 2005 | Palomar | NEAT | · | 370 m | MPC · JPL |
| 882154 | 2015 VV_{28} | — | November 1, 2015 | Haleakala | Pan-STARRS 1 | · | 1.4 km | MPC · JPL |
| 882155 | 2015 VX_{36} | — | October 23, 2015 | Mount Lemmon | Mount Lemmon Survey | · | 1.5 km | MPC · JPL |
| 882156 | 2015 VR_{39} | — | October 13, 2015 | Mount Lemmon | Mount Lemmon Survey | · | 1.4 km | MPC · JPL |
| 882157 | 2015 VK_{43} | — | June 25, 2015 | Haleakala | Pan-STARRS 1 | · | 1.2 km | MPC · JPL |
| 882158 | 2015 VS_{43} | — | June 27, 2015 | Haleakala | Pan-STARRS 1 | · | 1.1 km | MPC · JPL |
| 882159 | 2015 VA_{45} | — | July 25, 2015 | Haleakala | Pan-STARRS 1 | · | 1.3 km | MPC · JPL |
| 882160 | 2015 VD_{46} | — | October 21, 2011 | Mount Lemmon | Mount Lemmon Survey | · | 870 m | MPC · JPL |
| 882161 | 2015 VM_{49} | — | September 6, 2015 | Catalina | CSS | · | 1.2 km | MPC · JPL |
| 882162 | 2015 VE_{52} | — | October 26, 2011 | Haleakala | Pan-STARRS 1 | · | 760 m | MPC · JPL |
| 882163 | 2015 VH_{59} | — | November 6, 2005 | Kitt Peak | Spacewatch | · | 1.3 km | MPC · JPL |
| 882164 | 2015 VT_{73} | — | September 23, 2015 | Haleakala | Pan-STARRS 1 | · | 1.2 km | MPC · JPL |
| 882165 | 2015 VB_{76} | — | October 13, 2015 | Haleakala | Pan-STARRS 1 | · | 1.3 km | MPC · JPL |
| 882166 | 2015 VF_{85} | — | August 21, 2015 | Haleakala | Pan-STARRS 1 | · | 1.4 km | MPC · JPL |
| 882167 | 2015 VO_{86} | — | August 21, 2015 | Haleakala | Pan-STARRS 1 | · | 500 m | MPC · JPL |
| 882168 | 2015 VP_{89} | — | September 9, 2015 | Haleakala | Pan-STARRS 1 | · | 1.9 km | MPC · JPL |
| 882169 | 2015 VL_{98} | — | August 7, 2008 | La Sagra | OAM | · | 520 m | MPC · JPL |
| 882170 | 2015 VZ_{100} | — | October 10, 2015 | Haleakala | Pan-STARRS 1 | AGN | 860 m | MPC · JPL |
| 882171 | 2015 VM_{102} | — | October 10, 2015 | Haleakala | Pan-STARRS 1 | PHO | 630 m | MPC · JPL |
| 882172 | 2015 VR_{104} | — | November 26, 2005 | Mount Lemmon | Mount Lemmon Survey | · | 1.3 km | MPC · JPL |
| 882173 | 2015 VL_{105} | — | November 10, 2015 | Space Surveillance | Space Surveillance Telescope | AMO | 670 m | MPC · JPL |
| 882174 | 2015 VF_{118} | — | October 10, 2015 | Haleakala | Pan-STARRS 1 | · | 740 m | MPC · JPL |
| 882175 | 2015 VP_{130} | — | November 14, 2010 | Mount Lemmon | Mount Lemmon Survey | · | 1.2 km | MPC · JPL |
| 882176 | 2015 VK_{135} | — | November 6, 2010 | Kitt Peak | Spacewatch | H | 310 m | MPC · JPL |
| 882177 | 2015 VY_{135} | — | October 10, 2015 | Haleakala | Pan-STARRS 1 | · | 1.2 km | MPC · JPL |
| 882178 | 2015 VW_{140} | — | September 9, 2015 | Haleakala | Pan-STARRS 1 | (194) | 700 m | MPC · JPL |
| 882179 | 2015 VQ_{142} | — | October 25, 2015 | Haleakala | Pan-STARRS 1 | H | 410 m | MPC · JPL |
| 882180 | 2015 VD_{149} | — | October 21, 2015 | Haleakala | Pan-STARRS 1 | · | 1.3 km | MPC · JPL |
| 882181 | 2015 VY_{153} | — | November 2, 2015 | Haleakala | Pan-STARRS 1 | EUN | 580 m | MPC · JPL |
| 882182 | 2015 VU_{162} | — | July 31, 2014 | Haleakala | Pan-STARRS 1 | · | 1.3 km | MPC · JPL |
| 882183 | 2015 VY_{178} | — | October 9, 2015 | Haleakala | Pan-STARRS 1 | · | 630 m | MPC · JPL |
| 882184 | 2015 VC_{182} | — | October 2, 2010 | Mount Lemmon | Mount Lemmon Survey | · | 1.2 km | MPC · JPL |
| 882185 | 2015 VO_{183} | — | November 14, 2015 | Mount Lemmon | Mount Lemmon Survey | · | 1.5 km | MPC · JPL |
| 882186 | 2015 VV_{185} | — | November 13, 2015 | Kitt Peak | Spacewatch | · | 1.3 km | MPC · JPL |
| 882187 | 2015 VW_{185} | — | November 6, 2015 | Mount Lemmon | Mount Lemmon Survey | · | 860 m | MPC · JPL |
| 882188 | 2015 VD_{190} | — | November 1, 2015 | Haleakala | Pan-STARRS 1 | · | 1.4 km | MPC · JPL |
| 882189 | 2015 VX_{190} | — | November 3, 2015 | Mount Lemmon | Mount Lemmon Survey | · | 1.5 km | MPC · JPL |
| 882190 | 2015 VG_{191} | — | November 3, 2015 | Mount Lemmon | Mount Lemmon Survey | · | 1.3 km | MPC · JPL |
| 882191 | 2015 VD_{192} | — | November 1, 2015 | Mount Lemmon | Mount Lemmon Survey | · | 1.3 km | MPC · JPL |
| 882192 | 2015 VF_{192} | — | November 8, 2015 | Mount Lemmon | Mount Lemmon Survey | · | 1.8 km | MPC · JPL |
| 882193 | 2015 VT_{192} | — | November 6, 2015 | ESA OGS | ESA OGS | · | 1.2 km | MPC · JPL |
| 882194 | 2015 VC_{197} | — | November 1, 2015 | Mount Lemmon | Mount Lemmon Survey | · | 1.5 km | MPC · JPL |
| 882195 | 2015 VO_{199} | — | November 13, 2015 | Mount Lemmon | Mount Lemmon Survey | · | 2.1 km | MPC · JPL |
| 882196 | 2015 VN_{205} | — | November 14, 2015 | Mount Lemmon | Mount Lemmon Survey | EOS | 1.4 km | MPC · JPL |
| 882197 | 2015 VZ_{224} | — | November 6, 2015 | Mount Lemmon | Mount Lemmon Survey | · | 1.5 km | MPC · JPL |
| 882198 | 2015 WF_{3} | — | November 18, 2015 | Kitt Peak | Spacewatch | · | 2.0 km | MPC · JPL |
| 882199 | 2015 WN_{4} | — | October 24, 2015 | Mount Lemmon | Mount Lemmon Survey | · | 1.3 km | MPC · JPL |
| 882200 | 2015 WW_{6} | — | November 19, 2015 | Mount Lemmon | Mount Lemmon Survey | · | 1.2 km | MPC · JPL |

== 882201–882300 ==
back to top

| Designation | | | Discovery | | | Properties | | Ref |
| Permanent | Provisional | Named after | Date | Site | Discoverer(s) | Category | Diam. | Ref |
|---|---|---|---|---|---|---|---|---|
| 882201 | 2015 WQ_{7} | — | November 19, 2015 | Mount Lemmon | Mount Lemmon Survey | · | 720 m | MPC · JPL |
| 882202 | 2015 WL_{9} | — | September 9, 2015 | Haleakala | Pan-STARRS 1 | · | 1.6 km | MPC · JPL |
| 882203 | 2015 WO_{16} | — | November 19, 2015 | Mount Lemmon | Mount Lemmon Survey | H | 390 m | MPC · JPL |
| 882204 | 2015 WA_{17} | — | November 18, 2015 | Haleakala | Pan-STARRS 1 | H | 430 m | MPC · JPL |
| 882205 | 2015 WT_{17} | — | November 22, 2015 | Mount Lemmon | Mount Lemmon Survey | critical | 890 m | MPC · JPL |
| 882206 | 2015 WK_{20} | — | October 23, 2011 | Haleakala | Pan-STARRS 1 | · | 690 m | MPC · JPL |
| 882207 | 2015 WS_{22} | — | October 24, 2015 | Mount Lemmon | Mount Lemmon Survey | · | 1.5 km | MPC · JPL |
| 882208 | 2015 WW_{24} | — | November 16, 2015 | Haleakala | Pan-STARRS 1 | · | 1.6 km | MPC · JPL |
| 882209 | 2015 WK_{26} | — | January 31, 2017 | Haleakala | Pan-STARRS 1 | · | 2.2 km | MPC · JPL |
| 882210 | 2015 WO_{26} | — | November 23, 2015 | Mount Lemmon | Mount Lemmon Survey | · | 1.3 km | MPC · JPL |
| 882211 | 2015 WU_{26} | — | October 26, 2011 | Haleakala | Pan-STARRS 1 | · | 670 m | MPC · JPL |
| 882212 | 2015 WE_{28} | — | November 19, 2015 | Mount Lemmon | Mount Lemmon Survey | · | 2.0 km | MPC · JPL |
| 882213 | 2015 WD_{29} | — | November 23, 2015 | Mount Lemmon | Mount Lemmon Survey | critical | 880 m | MPC · JPL |
| 882214 | 2015 WY_{31} | — | November 21, 2015 | Mount Lemmon | Mount Lemmon Survey | EOS | 1.2 km | MPC · JPL |
| 882215 | 2015 WJ_{33} | — | November 22, 2015 | Mount Lemmon | Mount Lemmon Survey | H | 490 m | MPC · JPL |
| 882216 | 2015 XH | — | September 22, 2015 | Haleakala | Pan-STARRS 1 | H | 480 m | MPC · JPL |
| 882217 | 2015 XN_{3} | — | December 1, 2015 | Space Surveillance | Space Surveillance Telescope | · | 1 km | MPC · JPL |
| 882218 | 2015 XC_{14} | — | July 25, 2014 | Haleakala | Pan-STARRS 1 | THM | 1.4 km | MPC · JPL |
| 882219 | 2015 XO_{16} | — | September 9, 2015 | Haleakala | Pan-STARRS 1 | · | 1.3 km | MPC · JPL |
| 882220 | 2015 XO_{18} | — | November 12, 2010 | Mount Lemmon | Mount Lemmon Survey | · | 1.2 km | MPC · JPL |
| 882221 | 2015 XX_{18} | — | September 9, 2015 | Haleakala | Pan-STARRS 1 | · | 1.0 km | MPC · JPL |
| 882222 | 2015 XS_{32} | — | September 19, 2015 | Haleakala | Pan-STARRS 1 | EUN | 830 m | MPC · JPL |
| 882223 | 2015 XU_{37} | — | November 18, 2015 | Haleakala | Pan-STARRS 1 | · | 2.2 km | MPC · JPL |
| 882224 | 2015 XK_{45} | — | November 21, 2015 | Mount Lemmon | Mount Lemmon Survey | EOS | 1.1 km | MPC · JPL |
| 882225 | 2015 XO_{52} | — | October 9, 2015 | Haleakala | Pan-STARRS 1 | · | 1.2 km | MPC · JPL |
| 882226 | 2015 XJ_{54} | — | December 2, 2015 | Haleakala | Pan-STARRS 1 | · | 880 m | MPC · JPL |
| 882227 | 2015 XT_{54} | — | October 9, 2015 | Haleakala | Pan-STARRS 1 | H | 340 m | MPC · JPL |
| 882228 | 2015 XT_{55} | — | September 27, 2006 | Mount Lemmon | Mount Lemmon Survey | · | 1.7 km | MPC · JPL |
| 882229 | 2015 XE_{69} | — | November 23, 2003 | Kitt Peak | Spacewatch | · | 880 m | MPC · JPL |
| 882230 | 2015 XR_{71} | — | October 24, 2015 | Haleakala | Pan-STARRS 1 | · | 1.1 km | MPC · JPL |
| 882231 | 2015 XG_{100} | — | November 8, 2010 | Mount Lemmon | Mount Lemmon Survey | · | 1.3 km | MPC · JPL |
| 882232 | 2015 XZ_{104} | — | December 4, 2015 | Haleakala | Pan-STARRS 1 | · | 1.6 km | MPC · JPL |
| 882233 | 2015 XF_{105} | — | December 13, 2010 | Mount Lemmon | Mount Lemmon Survey | · | 1.4 km | MPC · JPL |
| 882234 | 2015 XX_{105} | — | December 4, 2015 | Haleakala | Pan-STARRS 1 | · | 1.8 km | MPC · JPL |
| 882235 | 2015 XK_{106} | — | December 4, 2015 | Haleakala | Pan-STARRS 1 | · | 1.2 km | MPC · JPL |
| 882236 | 2015 XB_{110} | — | December 4, 2015 | Haleakala | Pan-STARRS 1 | · | 1.3 km | MPC · JPL |
| 882237 | 2015 XF_{110} | — | August 20, 2014 | Haleakala | Pan-STARRS 1 | EOS | 1.2 km | MPC · JPL |
| 882238 | 2015 XY_{119} | — | December 4, 2015 | Haleakala | Pan-STARRS 1 | · | 1.4 km | MPC · JPL |
| 882239 | 2015 XO_{121} | — | December 4, 2015 | Haleakala | Pan-STARRS 1 | · | 1.1 km | MPC · JPL |
| 882240 | 2015 XG_{122} | — | December 4, 2015 | Haleakala | Pan-STARRS 1 | · | 1.3 km | MPC · JPL |
| 882241 | 2015 XW_{124} | — | December 4, 2015 | Haleakala | Pan-STARRS 1 | · | 840 m | MPC · JPL |
| 882242 | 2015 XV_{127} | — | March 13, 2011 | Kitt Peak | Spacewatch | TIR | 1.9 km | MPC · JPL |
| 882243 | 2015 XH_{129} | — | November 22, 2015 | Mount Lemmon | Mount Lemmon Survey | H | 350 m | MPC · JPL |
| 882244 | 2015 XK_{130} | — | September 23, 2015 | Haleakala | Pan-STARRS 1 | · | 1.5 km | MPC · JPL |
| 882245 | 2015 XO_{130} | — | January 14, 2011 | Mount Lemmon | Mount Lemmon Survey | · | 1.5 km | MPC · JPL |
| 882246 | 2015 XL_{132} | — | November 24, 2011 | Mount Lemmon | Mount Lemmon Survey | · | 750 m | MPC · JPL |
| 882247 | 2015 XU_{132} | — | November 22, 2015 | Mount Lemmon | Mount Lemmon Survey | · | 1.3 km | MPC · JPL |
| 882248 | 2015 XW_{137} | — | December 23, 2012 | Haleakala | Pan-STARRS 1 | · | 560 m | MPC · JPL |
| 882249 | 2015 XX_{137} | — | November 20, 2015 | Kitt Peak | Spacewatch | · | 350 m | MPC · JPL |
| 882250 | 2015 XE_{140} | — | November 25, 2011 | Haleakala | Pan-STARRS 1 | · | 730 m | MPC · JPL |
| 882251 | 2015 XH_{145} | — | November 13, 2015 | Kitt Peak | Spacewatch | H | 480 m | MPC · JPL |
| 882252 | 2015 XK_{145} | — | December 4, 2015 | Mount Lemmon | Mount Lemmon Survey | (1338) (FLO) | 360 m | MPC · JPL |
| 882253 | 2015 XW_{145} | — | November 9, 2015 | Mount Lemmon | Mount Lemmon Survey | · | 1.1 km | MPC · JPL |
| 882254 | 2015 XM_{162} | — | October 13, 2015 | Haleakala | Pan-STARRS 1 | EOS | 1.4 km | MPC · JPL |
| 882255 | 2015 XC_{163} | — | December 5, 2015 | Haleakala | Pan-STARRS 1 | · | 1.3 km | MPC · JPL |
| 882256 | 2015 XL_{167} | — | December 17, 2009 | Mount Lemmon | Mount Lemmon Survey | THB | 2.4 km | MPC · JPL |
| 882257 | 2015 XV_{170} | — | December 4, 2015 | Mount Lemmon | Mount Lemmon Survey | · | 1.7 km | MPC · JPL |
| 882258 | 2015 XK_{174} | — | May 8, 2013 | Haleakala | Pan-STARRS 1 | · | 1.7 km | MPC · JPL |
| 882259 | 2015 XA_{185} | — | December 4, 2015 | Haleakala | Pan-STARRS 1 | · | 1.7 km | MPC · JPL |
| 882260 | 2015 XH_{194} | — | December 24, 2006 | Kitt Peak | Spacewatch | · | 1.2 km | MPC · JPL |
| 882261 | 2015 XQ_{202} | — | September 23, 2015 | Haleakala | Pan-STARRS 1 | · | 890 m | MPC · JPL |
| 882262 | 2015 XA_{208} | — | November 20, 2015 | Mount Lemmon | Mount Lemmon Survey | · | 2.2 km | MPC · JPL |
| 882263 | 2015 XJ_{210} | — | December 3, 2015 | Mount Lemmon | Mount Lemmon Survey | EOS | 1.1 km | MPC · JPL |
| 882264 | 2015 XG_{212} | — | November 22, 2015 | Mount Lemmon | Mount Lemmon Survey | · | 1.1 km | MPC · JPL |
| 882265 | 2015 XL_{218} | — | December 4, 2015 | Mount Lemmon | Mount Lemmon Survey | · | 1.4 km | MPC · JPL |
| 882266 | 2015 XX_{230} | — | December 6, 2015 | Haleakala | Pan-STARRS 1 | (5) | 690 m | MPC · JPL |
| 882267 | 2015 XJ_{232} | — | December 6, 2015 | Haleakala | Pan-STARRS 1 | · | 1.1 km | MPC · JPL |
| 882268 | 2015 XL_{233} | — | December 6, 2015 | Haleakala | Pan-STARRS 1 | · | 760 m | MPC · JPL |
| 882269 | 2015 XB_{239} | — | November 22, 2015 | Mount Lemmon | Mount Lemmon Survey | · | 720 m | MPC · JPL |
| 882270 | 2015 XW_{244} | — | April 1, 2011 | Kitt Peak | Spacewatch | THB | 2.0 km | MPC · JPL |
| 882271 | 2015 XE_{253} | — | October 21, 2015 | Haleakala | Pan-STARRS 1 | EUN | 680 m | MPC · JPL |
| 882272 | 2015 XE_{259} | — | August 20, 2014 | Haleakala | Pan-STARRS 1 | EOS | 1.2 km | MPC · JPL |
| 882273 | 2015 XJ_{261} | — | December 7, 2015 | Haleakala | Pan-STARRS 1 | AMO | 410 m | MPC · JPL |
| 882274 | 2015 XQ_{262} | — | October 8, 2015 | Haleakala | Pan-STARRS 1 | · | 990 m | MPC · JPL |
| 882275 | 2015 XV_{266} | — | November 22, 2015 | Mount Lemmon | Mount Lemmon Survey | · | 1.7 km | MPC · JPL |
| 882276 | 2015 XQ_{272} | — | October 24, 2015 | Mount Lemmon | Mount Lemmon Survey | · | 1.5 km | MPC · JPL |
| 882277 | 2015 XA_{283} | — | December 4, 2015 | Haleakala | Pan-STARRS 1 | · | 1.2 km | MPC · JPL |
| 882278 | 2015 XP_{301} | — | December 6, 2015 | Mount Lemmon | Mount Lemmon Survey | · | 410 m | MPC · JPL |
| 882279 | 2015 XF_{311} | — | December 8, 2015 | Mount Lemmon | Mount Lemmon Survey | · | 1.1 km | MPC · JPL |
| 882280 | 2015 XE_{312} | — | December 8, 2015 | Mount Lemmon | Mount Lemmon Survey | · | 1.6 km | MPC · JPL |
| 882281 | 2015 XA_{319} | — | November 1, 2008 | Mount Lemmon | Mount Lemmon Survey | · | 600 m | MPC · JPL |
| 882282 | 2015 XM_{321} | — | December 6, 2015 | Mount Lemmon | Mount Lemmon Survey | · | 720 m | MPC · JPL |
| 882283 | 2015 XZ_{326} | — | December 8, 2015 | Haleakala | Pan-STARRS 1 | · | 1.4 km | MPC · JPL |
| 882284 | 2015 XP_{329} | — | December 8, 2015 | Mount Lemmon | Mount Lemmon Survey | L5 | 6.4 km | MPC · JPL |
| 882285 | 2015 XR_{335} | — | December 8, 2015 | Haleakala | Pan-STARRS 1 | · | 1.4 km | MPC · JPL |
| 882286 | 2015 XN_{349} | — | December 8, 2015 | Haleakala | Pan-STARRS 1 | · | 950 m | MPC · JPL |
| 882287 | 2015 XL_{350} | — | December 6, 2015 | Haleakala | Pan-STARRS 1 | · | 1.2 km | MPC · JPL |
| 882288 | 2015 XL_{351} | — | December 23, 2012 | Haleakala | Pan-STARRS 1 | · | 1.0 km | MPC · JPL |
| 882289 | 2015 XL_{353} | — | December 6, 2015 | Mount Lemmon | Mount Lemmon Survey | · | 1.1 km | MPC · JPL |
| 882290 | 2015 XV_{361} | — | September 23, 2015 | Haleakala | Pan-STARRS 1 | · | 900 m | MPC · JPL |
| 882291 | 2015 XP_{374} | — | December 12, 2015 | Haleakala | Pan-STARRS 1 | · | 930 m | MPC · JPL |
| 882292 | 2015 XK_{378} | — | December 14, 2015 | Mount Lemmon | Mount Lemmon Survey | H | 410 m | MPC · JPL |
| 882293 | 2015 XO_{379} | — | December 3, 2015 | Calar Alto-CASADO | Hellmich, S., Mottola, S. | · | 430 m | MPC · JPL |
| 882294 | 2015 XK_{381} | — | October 14, 2015 | Haleakala | Pan-STARRS 1 | · | 1.6 km | MPC · JPL |
| 882295 | 2015 XC_{384} | — | December 30, 2005 | Kitt Peak | Spacewatch | · | 1.4 km | MPC · JPL |
| 882296 | 2015 XK_{384} | — | January 26, 2011 | Mount Lemmon | Mount Lemmon Survey | · | 1.3 km | MPC · JPL |
| 882297 | 2015 XB_{385} | — | May 19, 2014 | Haleakala | Pan-STARRS 1 | H | 350 m | MPC · JPL |
| 882298 | 2015 XJ_{385} | — | January 14, 2011 | Kitt Peak | Spacewatch | H | 310 m | MPC · JPL |
| 882299 | 2015 XS_{385} | — | December 9, 2015 | Haleakala | Pan-STARRS 1 | H | 410 m | MPC · JPL |
| 882300 | 2015 XJ_{388} | — | December 7, 2015 | Haleakala | Pan-STARRS 1 | H | 320 m | MPC · JPL |

== 882301–882400 ==
back to top

| Designation | | | Discovery | | | Properties | | Ref |
| Permanent | Provisional | Named after | Date | Site | Discoverer(s) | Category | Diam. | Ref |
|---|---|---|---|---|---|---|---|---|
| 882301 | 2015 XD_{389} | — | December 13, 2015 | Haleakala | Pan-STARRS 1 | H | 330 m | MPC · JPL |
| 882302 | 2015 XF_{389} | — | December 13, 2015 | Haleakala | Pan-STARRS 1 | H | 390 m | MPC · JPL |
| 882303 | 2015 XK_{391} | — | May 22, 2011 | Mount Lemmon | Mount Lemmon Survey | · | 2.3 km | MPC · JPL |
| 882304 | 2015 XW_{391} | — | December 9, 2015 | Haleakala | Pan-STARRS 1 | JUN | 720 m | MPC · JPL |
| 882305 | 2015 XE_{393} | — | December 13, 2015 | Haleakala | Pan-STARRS 1 | · | 1.9 km | MPC · JPL |
| 882306 | 2015 XP_{394} | — | December 13, 2015 | Haleakala | Pan-STARRS 1 | TIR | 1.8 km | MPC · JPL |
| 882307 | 2015 XL_{402} | — | November 17, 2009 | Mount Lemmon | Mount Lemmon Survey | THB | 2.2 km | MPC · JPL |
| 882308 | 2015 XN_{403} | — | December 9, 2015 | Haleakala | Pan-STARRS 1 | · | 1.5 km | MPC · JPL |
| 882309 | 2015 XF_{405} | — | August 20, 2014 | Haleakala | Pan-STARRS 1 | · | 1.4 km | MPC · JPL |
| 882310 | 2015 XG_{409} | — | November 18, 2009 | Kitt Peak | Spacewatch | · | 2.0 km | MPC · JPL |
| 882311 | 2015 XS_{409} | — | December 7, 2015 | Haleakala | Pan-STARRS 1 | · | 1.4 km | MPC · JPL |
| 882312 | 2015 XL_{412} | — | December 8, 2015 | Haleakala | Pan-STARRS 1 | · | 2.3 km | MPC · JPL |
| 882313 | 2015 XC_{413} | — | December 9, 2015 | Mount Lemmon | Mount Lemmon Survey | · | 910 m | MPC · JPL |
| 882314 | 2015 XX_{417} | — | November 22, 2014 | Haleakala | Pan-STARRS 1 | · | 2.3 km | MPC · JPL |
| 882315 | 2015 XU_{420} | — | December 14, 2015 | Haleakala | Pan-STARRS 1 | · | 1.1 km | MPC · JPL |
| 882316 | 2015 XK_{422} | — | December 4, 2015 | Haleakala | Pan-STARRS 1 | · | 2.5 km | MPC · JPL |
| 882317 | 2015 XA_{423} | — | December 13, 2015 | Haleakala | Pan-STARRS 1 | · | 1.7 km | MPC · JPL |
| 882318 | 2015 XE_{423} | — | December 7, 2015 | Haleakala | Pan-STARRS 1 | · | 2.4 km | MPC · JPL |
| 882319 | 2015 XF_{423} | — | December 14, 2015 | Haleakala | Pan-STARRS 1 | · | 2.2 km | MPC · JPL |
| 882320 | 2015 XX_{423} | — | December 7, 2015 | Haleakala | Pan-STARRS 1 | EOS | 1.5 km | MPC · JPL |
| 882321 | 2015 XB_{424} | — | December 9, 2015 | Haleakala | Pan-STARRS 1 | · | 2.1 km | MPC · JPL |
| 882322 | 2015 XO_{424} | — | December 7, 2015 | Haleakala | Pan-STARRS 1 | · | 1.0 km | MPC · JPL |
| 882323 | 2015 XQ_{424} | — | December 9, 2015 | Haleakala | Pan-STARRS 1 | · | 1.7 km | MPC · JPL |
| 882324 | 2015 XA_{425} | — | December 6, 2015 | Mount Lemmon | Mount Lemmon Survey | EUN | 850 m | MPC · JPL |
| 882325 | 2015 XL_{425} | — | December 7, 2015 | Haleakala | Pan-STARRS 1 | · | 940 m | MPC · JPL |
| 882326 | 2015 XR_{425} | — | December 10, 2004 | Kitt Peak | Spacewatch | · | 1.8 km | MPC · JPL |
| 882327 | 2015 XF_{426} | — | December 8, 2015 | Haleakala | Pan-STARRS 1 | · | 560 m | MPC · JPL |
| 882328 | 2015 XM_{426} | — | December 10, 2015 | Mount Lemmon | Mount Lemmon Survey | · | 1.5 km | MPC · JPL |
| 882329 | 2015 XA_{427} | — | March 15, 2010 | WISE | WISE | · | 2.7 km | MPC · JPL |
| 882330 | 2015 XH_{427} | — | December 8, 2015 | Haleakala | Pan-STARRS 1 | · | 1.2 km | MPC · JPL |
| 882331 | 2015 XZ_{428} | — | December 6, 2015 | Mount Lemmon | Mount Lemmon Survey | EUN | 820 m | MPC · JPL |
| 882332 | 2015 XF_{430} | — | December 4, 2015 | Haleakala | Pan-STARRS 1 | · | 700 m | MPC · JPL |
| 882333 | 2015 XO_{433} | — | December 14, 2015 | Haleakala | Pan-STARRS 1 | · | 750 m | MPC · JPL |
| 882334 | 2015 XR_{435} | — | December 1, 2015 | Haleakala | Pan-STARRS 1 | · | 650 m | MPC · JPL |
| 882335 | 2015 XQ_{436} | — | December 7, 2015 | Haleakala | Pan-STARRS 1 | · | 930 m | MPC · JPL |
| 882336 | 2015 XX_{436} | — | December 14, 2015 | Mount Lemmon | Mount Lemmon Survey | · | 1.7 km | MPC · JPL |
| 882337 | 2015 XO_{437} | — | December 10, 2015 | Mount Lemmon | Mount Lemmon Survey | · | 2.2 km | MPC · JPL |
| 882338 | 2015 XJ_{438} | — | December 14, 2015 | Mount Lemmon | Mount Lemmon Survey | · | 2.0 km | MPC · JPL |
| 882339 | 2015 XO_{441} | — | December 13, 2015 | Haleakala | Pan-STARRS 1 | EOS | 1.2 km | MPC · JPL |
| 882340 | 2015 XH_{442} | — | December 10, 2015 | Mount Lemmon | Mount Lemmon Survey | · | 910 m | MPC · JPL |
| 882341 | 2015 XM_{442} | — | October 22, 2014 | Mount Lemmon | Mount Lemmon Survey | · | 1.7 km | MPC · JPL |
| 882342 | 2015 XS_{446} | — | December 13, 2015 | Haleakala | Pan-STARRS 1 | · | 1.4 km | MPC · JPL |
| 882343 | 2015 XA_{450} | — | December 9, 2015 | Haleakala | Pan-STARRS 1 | · | 1.1 km | MPC · JPL |
| 882344 | 2015 XV_{450} | — | December 8, 2015 | Mount Lemmon | Mount Lemmon Survey | EOS | 1.3 km | MPC · JPL |
| 882345 | 2015 XP_{451} | — | December 8, 2015 | Mount Lemmon | Mount Lemmon Survey | · | 1.2 km | MPC · JPL |
| 882346 | 2015 XU_{451} | — | December 9, 2015 | Haleakala | Pan-STARRS 1 | · | 1.5 km | MPC · JPL |
| 882347 | 2015 XT_{453} | — | December 3, 2015 | Haleakala | Pan-STARRS 1 | · | 1.4 km | MPC · JPL |
| 882348 | 2015 XX_{454} | — | December 2, 2015 | Haleakala | Pan-STARRS 1 | · | 2.2 km | MPC · JPL |
| 882349 | 2015 XS_{456} | — | December 8, 2015 | Mount Lemmon | Mount Lemmon Survey | · | 1.2 km | MPC · JPL |
| 882350 | 2015 XP_{459} | — | December 13, 2015 | Haleakala | Pan-STARRS 1 | · | 1.6 km | MPC · JPL |
| 882351 | 2015 XE_{460} | — | December 4, 2015 | Mount Lemmon | Mount Lemmon Survey | · | 1.3 km | MPC · JPL |
| 882352 | 2015 XR_{460} | — | December 9, 2015 | Haleakala | Pan-STARRS 1 | · | 1.9 km | MPC · JPL |
| 882353 | 2015 XP_{463} | — | December 9, 2015 | Mount Lemmon | Mount Lemmon Survey | · | 2.1 km | MPC · JPL |
| 882354 | 2015 XC_{468} | — | December 13, 2015 | Haleakala | Pan-STARRS 1 | · | 2.9 km | MPC · JPL |
| 882355 | 2015 XH_{471} | — | December 6, 2015 | Haleakala | Pan-STARRS 1 | L5 | 6.5 km | MPC · JPL |
| 882356 | 2015 XY_{477} | — | December 7, 2015 | Haleakala | Pan-STARRS 1 | · | 1.3 km | MPC · JPL |
| 882357 | 2015 XX_{480} | — | December 13, 2015 | Haleakala | Pan-STARRS 1 | · | 2.3 km | MPC · JPL |
| 882358 | 2015 XV_{488} | — | August 28, 2014 | Haleakala | Pan-STARRS 1 | · | 1.3 km | MPC · JPL |
| 882359 | 2015 XF_{489} | — | December 8, 2015 | Haleakala | Pan-STARRS 1 | · | 1.4 km | MPC · JPL |
| 882360 | 2015 XY_{489} | — | December 9, 2015 | Haleakala | Pan-STARRS 1 | THB | 2.6 km | MPC · JPL |
| 882361 | 2015 XQ_{494} | — | December 13, 2015 | Haleakala | Pan-STARRS 1 | L5 | 6.6 km | MPC · JPL |
| 882362 | 2015 XT_{500} | — | December 13, 2015 | Haleakala | Pan-STARRS 1 | · | 1.9 km | MPC · JPL |
| 882363 | 2015 YX_{3} | — | October 14, 2015 | Haleakala | Pan-STARRS 1 | H | 420 m | MPC · JPL |
| 882364 | 2015 YF_{8} | — | December 18, 2015 | Oukaïmeden | M. Ory | · | 2.1 km | MPC · JPL |
| 882365 | 2015 YR_{8} | — | December 18, 2015 | Mount Lemmon | Mount Lemmon Survey | · | 1.1 km | MPC · JPL |
| 882366 | 2015 YH_{9} | — | December 10, 2015 | Mount Lemmon | Mount Lemmon Survey | · | 1.5 km | MPC · JPL |
| 882367 | 2015 YR_{9} | — | November 23, 2015 | Mount Lemmon | Mount Lemmon Survey | · | 920 m | MPC · JPL |
| 882368 | 2015 YN_{13} | — | December 31, 2015 | Haleakala | Pan-STARRS 1 | · | 1.0 km | MPC · JPL |
| 882369 | 2015 YH_{16} | — | April 3, 2011 | Haleakala | Pan-STARRS 1 | THB | 1.9 km | MPC · JPL |
| 882370 | 2015 YF_{17} | — | December 7, 2015 | Haleakala | Pan-STARRS 1 | · | 1.5 km | MPC · JPL |
| 882371 | 2015 YD_{20} | — | November 30, 2015 | Catalina | CSS | H | 460 m | MPC · JPL |
| 882372 | 2015 YM_{21} | — | January 5, 2011 | Haleakala | Pan-STARRS 1 | H | 340 m | MPC · JPL |
| 882373 | 2015 YO_{21} | — | December 17, 2015 | Mount Lemmon | Mount Lemmon Survey | H | 350 m | MPC · JPL |
| 882374 | 2015 YH_{27} | — | November 22, 2015 | Mount Lemmon | Mount Lemmon Survey | · | 2.2 km | MPC · JPL |
| 882375 | 2015 YS_{28} | — | December 19, 2015 | Mount Lemmon | Mount Lemmon Survey | · | 860 m | MPC · JPL |
| 882376 | 2015 YT_{28} | — | December 29, 2015 | Haleakala | Pan-STARRS 1 | T_{j} (2.98) | 2.0 km | MPC · JPL |
| 882377 | 2015 YX_{28} | — | December 18, 2015 | Mount Lemmon | Mount Lemmon Survey | · | 1.6 km | MPC · JPL |
| 882378 | 2015 YQ_{29} | — | December 18, 2015 | Kitt Peak | Spacewatch | · | 840 m | MPC · JPL |
| 882379 | 2015 YT_{30} | — | December 19, 2015 | Mount Lemmon | Mount Lemmon Survey | V | 470 m | MPC · JPL |
| 882380 | 2015 YD_{32} | — | December 16, 2015 | Mount Lemmon | Mount Lemmon Survey | H | 380 m | MPC · JPL |
| 882381 | 2015 YP_{33} | — | December 18, 2015 | Kitt Peak | Spacewatch | GEF | 950 m | MPC · JPL |
| 882382 | 2016 AH_{5} | — | August 28, 2006 | Kitt Peak | Spacewatch | (5) | 910 m | MPC · JPL |
| 882383 | 2016 AD_{12} | — | January 1, 2016 | Oukaïmeden | M. Ory | · | 860 m | MPC · JPL |
| 882384 | 2016 AC_{24} | — | July 16, 2013 | Haleakala | Pan-STARRS 1 | · | 2.3 km | MPC · JPL |
| 882385 | 2016 AZ_{25} | — | July 30, 2014 | Haleakala | Pan-STARRS 1 | · | 1.3 km | MPC · JPL |
| 882386 | 2016 AK_{26} | — | January 3, 2016 | Haleakala | Pan-STARRS 1 | · | 940 m | MPC · JPL |
| 882387 | 2016 AJ_{29} | — | December 3, 2015 | Mount Lemmon | Mount Lemmon Survey | · | 1.5 km | MPC · JPL |
| 882388 | 2016 AY_{30} | — | December 29, 2008 | Kitt Peak | Spacewatch | · | 620 m | MPC · JPL |
| 882389 | 2016 AS_{34} | — | February 26, 2011 | Mount Lemmon | Mount Lemmon Survey | THM | 1.8 km | MPC · JPL |
| 882390 | 2016 AN_{43} | — | January 3, 2016 | Mount Lemmon | Mount Lemmon Survey | · | 1.4 km | MPC · JPL |
| 882391 | 2016 AU_{51} | — | September 20, 2006 | Kitt Peak | Spacewatch | · | 870 m | MPC · JPL |
| 882392 | 2016 AD_{54} | — | January 23, 2006 | Kitt Peak | Spacewatch | EOS | 1.4 km | MPC · JPL |
| 882393 | 2016 AV_{56} | — | January 4, 2016 | Haleakala | Pan-STARRS 1 | · | 1.6 km | MPC · JPL |
| 882394 | 2016 AN_{57} | — | February 7, 2010 | WISE | WISE | · | 2.2 km | MPC · JPL |
| 882395 | 2016 AS_{66} | — | November 6, 2015 | Mount Lemmon | Mount Lemmon Survey | · | 1.6 km | MPC · JPL |
| 882396 | 2016 AT_{72} | — | March 24, 2006 | Mount Lemmon | Mount Lemmon Survey | · | 1.5 km | MPC · JPL |
| 882397 | 2016 AV_{74} | — | January 4, 2016 | Haleakala | Pan-STARRS 1 | · | 580 m | MPC · JPL |
| 882398 | 2016 AC_{78} | — | October 30, 2009 | Mount Lemmon | Mount Lemmon Survey | · | 1.9 km | MPC · JPL |
| 882399 | 2016 AG_{82} | — | December 1, 2015 | Haleakala | Pan-STARRS 1 | · | 1.6 km | MPC · JPL |
| 882400 | 2016 AM_{84} | — | December 7, 2015 | Haleakala | Pan-STARRS 1 | · | 1.2 km | MPC · JPL |

== 882401–882500 ==
back to top

| Designation | | | Discovery | | | Properties | | Ref |
| Permanent | Provisional | Named after | Date | Site | Discoverer(s) | Category | Diam. | Ref |
|---|---|---|---|---|---|---|---|---|
| 882401 | 2016 AA_{89} | — | November 4, 2005 | Kitt Peak | Spacewatch | · | 1.5 km | MPC · JPL |
| 882402 | 2016 AF_{90} | — | November 10, 2015 | Mount Lemmon | Mount Lemmon Survey | (5) | 790 m | MPC · JPL |
| 882403 | 2016 AB_{91} | — | November 5, 2005 | Kitt Peak | Spacewatch | · | 440 m | MPC · JPL |
| 882404 | 2016 AU_{93} | — | November 21, 2009 | Kitt Peak | Spacewatch | · | 2.0 km | MPC · JPL |
| 882405 | 2016 AN_{94} | — | January 25, 2012 | Haleakala | Pan-STARRS 1 | · | 830 m | MPC · JPL |
| 882406 | 2016 AA_{108} | — | January 7, 2016 | Haleakala | Pan-STARRS 1 | EUP | 2.4 km | MPC · JPL |
| 882407 | 2016 AK_{111} | — | February 10, 2011 | Mount Lemmon | Mount Lemmon Survey | · | 1.7 km | MPC · JPL |
| 882408 | 2016 AP_{111} | — | March 10, 2011 | Kitt Peak | Spacewatch | · | 1.4 km | MPC · JPL |
| 882409 | 2016 AV_{111} | — | January 3, 2016 | Haleakala | Pan-STARRS 1 | · | 1.3 km | MPC · JPL |
| 882410 | 2016 AX_{115} | — | March 20, 1999 | Sacramento Peak | SDSS | · | 880 m | MPC · JPL |
| 882411 | 2016 AH_{116} | — | February 2, 2009 | Kitt Peak | Spacewatch | · | 430 m | MPC · JPL |
| 882412 | 2016 AD_{119} | — | January 3, 2016 | Mount Lemmon | Mount Lemmon Survey | H | 370 m | MPC · JPL |
| 882413 | 2016 AM_{119} | — | January 8, 2016 | Haleakala | Pan-STARRS 1 | · | 1.1 km | MPC · JPL |
| 882414 | 2016 AX_{123} | — | December 21, 2015 | Mount Lemmon | Mount Lemmon Survey | H | 520 m | MPC · JPL |
| 882415 | 2016 AE_{124} | — | January 8, 2016 | Haleakala | Pan-STARRS 1 | · | 1.2 km | MPC · JPL |
| 882416 | 2016 AT_{124} | — | January 8, 2016 | Haleakala | Pan-STARRS 1 | · | 1.8 km | MPC · JPL |
| 882417 | 2016 AY_{124} | — | January 8, 2016 | Haleakala | Pan-STARRS 1 | · | 2.5 km | MPC · JPL |
| 882418 | 2016 AD_{126} | — | January 8, 2016 | Haleakala | Pan-STARRS 1 | PHO | 840 m | MPC · JPL |
| 882419 | 2016 AX_{127} | — | December 17, 2009 | Mount Lemmon | Mount Lemmon Survey | THB | 2.0 km | MPC · JPL |
| 882420 | 2016 AD_{129} | — | October 26, 2009 | Mount Lemmon | Mount Lemmon Survey | · | 2.3 km | MPC · JPL |
| 882421 | 2016 AE_{133} | — | January 9, 2016 | Haleakala | Pan-STARRS 1 | · | 860 m | MPC · JPL |
| 882422 | 2016 AU_{133} | — | January 9, 2016 | Haleakala | Pan-STARRS 1 | · | 850 m | MPC · JPL |
| 882423 | 2016 AV_{137} | — | January 9, 2016 | Haleakala | Pan-STARRS 1 | · | 2.5 km | MPC · JPL |
| 882424 | 2016 AM_{138} | — | January 9, 2016 | Haleakala | Pan-STARRS 1 | · | 1.8 km | MPC · JPL |
| 882425 | 2016 AW_{140} | — | January 9, 2016 | Haleakala | Pan-STARRS 1 | · | 2.5 km | MPC · JPL |
| 882426 | 2016 AU_{149} | — | November 17, 2014 | Haleakala | Pan-STARRS 1 | · | 1.8 km | MPC · JPL |
| 882427 | 2016 AT_{150} | — | November 16, 2015 | Haleakala | Pan-STARRS 1 | · | 1.7 km | MPC · JPL |
| 882428 | 2016 AH_{152} | — | July 3, 2014 | Haleakala | Pan-STARRS 1 | EUN | 820 m | MPC · JPL |
| 882429 | 2016 AL_{153} | — | January 9, 2016 | Haleakala | Pan-STARRS 1 | · | 1.9 km | MPC · JPL |
| 882430 | 2016 AP_{153} | — | December 10, 2014 | Mount Lemmon | Mount Lemmon Survey | EUP | 3.1 km | MPC · JPL |
| 882431 | 2016 AA_{156} | — | December 7, 2015 | Haleakala | Pan-STARRS 1 | · | 1.3 km | MPC · JPL |
| 882432 | 2016 AV_{157} | — | April 30, 2011 | Mount Lemmon | Mount Lemmon Survey | · | 1.8 km | MPC · JPL |
| 882433 | 2016 AH_{159} | — | January 11, 2016 | Haleakala | Pan-STARRS 1 | critical | 690 m | MPC · JPL |
| 882434 | 2016 AE_{160} | — | January 11, 2016 | Haleakala | Pan-STARRS 1 | · | 1.7 km | MPC · JPL |
| 882435 | 2016 AM_{160} | — | December 19, 2009 | Mount Lemmon | Mount Lemmon Survey | · | 2.5 km | MPC · JPL |
| 882436 | 2016 AY_{163} | — | January 11, 2016 | Haleakala | Pan-STARRS 1 | · | 1.1 km | MPC · JPL |
| 882437 | 2016 AE_{169} | — | January 9, 2016 | Haleakala | Pan-STARRS 1 | TIR | 2.2 km | MPC · JPL |
| 882438 | 2016 AE_{173} | — | January 10, 2016 | Haleakala | Pan-STARRS 1 | · | 2.0 km | MPC · JPL |
| 882439 | 2016 AW_{175} | — | December 13, 2015 | Haleakala | Pan-STARRS 1 | · | 1.8 km | MPC · JPL |
| 882440 | 2016 AX_{176} | — | December 13, 2015 | Haleakala | Pan-STARRS 1 | TIR | 1.9 km | MPC · JPL |
| 882441 | 2016 AA_{178} | — | October 28, 2014 | Haleakala | Pan-STARRS 1 | EOS | 1.2 km | MPC · JPL |
| 882442 | 2016 AX_{180} | — | December 9, 2015 | Haleakala | Pan-STARRS 1 | TIR | 1.8 km | MPC · JPL |
| 882443 | 2016 AL_{182} | — | January 3, 2016 | Haleakala | Pan-STARRS 1 | H | 340 m | MPC · JPL |
| 882444 | 2016 AW_{182} | — | January 11, 2016 | Haleakala | Pan-STARRS 1 | H | 440 m | MPC · JPL |
| 882445 | 2016 AU_{185} | — | May 5, 2006 | Kitt Peak | Spacewatch | · | 1.5 km | MPC · JPL |
| 882446 | 2016 AC_{190} | — | December 14, 2004 | Kitt Peak | Spacewatch | · | 2.4 km | MPC · JPL |
| 882447 | 2016 AT_{198} | — | January 7, 2016 | Haleakala | Pan-STARRS 1 | H | 380 m | MPC · JPL |
| 882448 | 2016 AK_{200} | — | September 6, 2008 | Mount Lemmon | Mount Lemmon Survey | · | 2.0 km | MPC · JPL |
| 882449 | 2016 AO_{203} | — | January 3, 2016 | Haleakala | Pan-STARRS 1 | · | 2.8 km | MPC · JPL |
| 882450 | 2016 AD_{205} | — | January 4, 2016 | Haleakala | Pan-STARRS 1 | · | 1.2 km | MPC · JPL |
| 882451 | 2016 AR_{205} | — | January 4, 2016 | Haleakala | Pan-STARRS 1 | · | 2.4 km | MPC · JPL |
| 882452 | 2016 AZ_{205} | — | January 7, 2016 | Haleakala | Pan-STARRS 1 | · | 2.1 km | MPC · JPL |
| 882453 | 2016 AM_{207} | — | February 8, 2010 | WISE | WISE | · | 1.3 km | MPC · JPL |
| 882454 | 2016 AT_{208} | — | January 8, 2016 | Haleakala | Pan-STARRS 1 | · | 2.5 km | MPC · JPL |
| 882455 | 2016 AH_{210} | — | January 8, 2016 | Haleakala | Pan-STARRS 1 | · | 1.9 km | MPC · JPL |
| 882456 | 2016 AK_{210} | — | January 8, 2016 | Haleakala | Pan-STARRS 1 | · | 2.3 km | MPC · JPL |
| 882457 | 2016 AW_{211} | — | January 11, 2016 | Haleakala | Pan-STARRS 1 | · | 1.4 km | MPC · JPL |
| 882458 | 2016 AN_{212} | — | January 12, 2016 | Haleakala | Pan-STARRS 1 | · | 2.3 km | MPC · JPL |
| 882459 | 2016 AA_{213} | — | February 17, 2010 | Catalina | CSS | · | 3.2 km | MPC · JPL |
| 882460 | 2016 AQ_{213} | — | February 17, 2010 | Mount Lemmon | Mount Lemmon Survey | · | 3.0 km | MPC · JPL |
| 882461 | 2016 AW_{213} | — | January 14, 2016 | Haleakala | Pan-STARRS 1 | · | 700 m | MPC · JPL |
| 882462 | 2016 AC_{214} | — | January 14, 2016 | Haleakala | Pan-STARRS 1 | · | 1.2 km | MPC · JPL |
| 882463 | 2016 AL_{214} | — | October 4, 2002 | Sacramento Peak | SDSS | · | 2.1 km | MPC · JPL |
| 882464 | 2016 AO_{215} | — | January 15, 2016 | Haleakala | Pan-STARRS 1 | · | 1.9 km | MPC · JPL |
| 882465 | 2016 AX_{215} | — | March 19, 2010 | Kitt Peak | Spacewatch | · | 6.3 km | MPC · JPL |
| 882466 | 2016 AF_{232} | — | January 9, 2016 | Haleakala | Pan-STARRS 1 | · | 1.6 km | MPC · JPL |
| 882467 | 2016 AF_{235} | — | January 14, 2016 | Haleakala | Pan-STARRS 1 | · | 1.7 km | MPC · JPL |
| 882468 | 2016 AH_{239} | — | January 2, 2016 | Mount Lemmon | Mount Lemmon Survey | · | 1.5 km | MPC · JPL |
| 882469 | 2016 AD_{242} | — | January 3, 2016 | Haleakala | Pan-STARRS 1 | · | 850 m | MPC · JPL |
| 882470 | 2016 AZ_{244} | — | May 24, 2006 | Kitt Peak | Spacewatch | TIR | 2.0 km | MPC · JPL |
| 882471 | 2016 AO_{246} | — | August 22, 2014 | Haleakala | Pan-STARRS 1 | · | 1.2 km | MPC · JPL |
| 882472 | 2016 AA_{260} | — | April 12, 2011 | Mount Lemmon | Mount Lemmon Survey | LIX | 2.5 km | MPC · JPL |
| 882473 | 2016 AE_{262} | — | March 30, 2011 | Haleakala | Pan-STARRS 1 | · | 1.2 km | MPC · JPL |
| 882474 | 2016 AF_{265} | — | September 14, 2014 | Kitt Peak | Spacewatch | · | 1.5 km | MPC · JPL |
| 882475 | 2016 AB_{269} | — | January 24, 2011 | Kitt Peak | Spacewatch | · | 1.3 km | MPC · JPL |
| 882476 | 2016 AK_{269} | — | July 16, 2013 | Haleakala | Pan-STARRS 1 | · | 1.9 km | MPC · JPL |
| 882477 | 2016 AD_{270} | — | January 13, 2016 | Mount Lemmon | Mount Lemmon Survey | · | 1.3 km | MPC · JPL |
| 882478 | 2016 AV_{273} | — | January 14, 2016 | Haleakala | Pan-STARRS 1 | · | 1.7 km | MPC · JPL |
| 882479 | 2016 AW_{275} | — | October 30, 2014 | Mount Lemmon | Mount Lemmon Survey | EOS | 1.3 km | MPC · JPL |
| 882480 | 2016 AT_{278} | — | January 2, 2016 | Mount Lemmon | Mount Lemmon Survey | LIX | 2.8 km | MPC · JPL |
| 882481 | 2016 AH_{279} | — | January 1, 2016 | Mount Lemmon | Mount Lemmon Survey | TIR | 2.5 km | MPC · JPL |
| 882482 | 2016 AL_{279} | — | January 9, 2016 | Haleakala | Pan-STARRS 1 | H | 370 m | MPC · JPL |
| 882483 | 2016 AD_{280} | — | January 3, 2016 | Haleakala | Pan-STARRS 1 | H | 420 m | MPC · JPL |
| 882484 | 2016 AT_{280} | — | January 9, 2016 | Haleakala | Pan-STARRS 1 | · | 2.4 km | MPC · JPL |
| 882485 | 2016 AE_{281} | — | January 3, 2016 | Haleakala | Pan-STARRS 1 | H | 370 m | MPC · JPL |
| 882486 | 2016 AR_{281} | — | January 7, 2016 | Haleakala | Pan-STARRS 1 | PHO | 840 m | MPC · JPL |
| 882487 | 2016 AS_{281} | — | January 13, 2016 | Haleakala | Pan-STARRS 1 | · | 760 m | MPC · JPL |
| 882488 | 2016 AE_{282} | — | January 1, 2016 | Haleakala | Pan-STARRS 1 | T_{j} (2.95) | 3.3 km | MPC · JPL |
| 882489 | 2016 AJ_{283} | — | January 4, 2016 | Haleakala | Pan-STARRS 1 | · | 1.7 km | MPC · JPL |
| 882490 | 2016 AQ_{284} | — | January 11, 2010 | Mount Lemmon | Mount Lemmon Survey | · | 2.1 km | MPC · JPL |
| 882491 | 2016 AT_{285} | — | January 2, 2016 | Haleakala | Pan-STARRS 1 | · | 860 m | MPC · JPL |
| 882492 | 2016 AM_{287} | — | January 9, 2016 | Haleakala | Pan-STARRS 1 | · | 770 m | MPC · JPL |
| 882493 | 2016 AX_{287} | — | February 7, 2011 | Mount Lemmon | Mount Lemmon Survey | · | 1.3 km | MPC · JPL |
| 882494 | 2016 AE_{290} | — | January 3, 2016 | Haleakala | Pan-STARRS 1 | · | 410 m | MPC · JPL |
| 882495 | 2016 AU_{290} | — | January 8, 2016 | Haleakala | Pan-STARRS 1 | · | 520 m | MPC · JPL |
| 882496 | 2016 AK_{292} | — | January 14, 2016 | Haleakala | Pan-STARRS 1 | · | 2.7 km | MPC · JPL |
| 882497 | 2016 AH_{293} | — | January 3, 2016 | Haleakala | Pan-STARRS 1 | · | 2.5 km | MPC · JPL |
| 882498 | 2016 AP_{293} | — | January 9, 2016 | Haleakala | Pan-STARRS 1 | · | 2.2 km | MPC · JPL |
| 882499 | 2016 AF_{295} | — | January 3, 2016 | Haleakala | Pan-STARRS 1 | · | 2.4 km | MPC · JPL |
| 882500 | 2016 AD_{298} | — | January 4, 2016 | Haleakala | Pan-STARRS 1 | · | 1.7 km | MPC · JPL |

== 882501–882600 ==
back to top

| Designation | | | Discovery | | | Properties | | Ref |
| Permanent | Provisional | Named after | Date | Site | Discoverer(s) | Category | Diam. | Ref |
|---|---|---|---|---|---|---|---|---|
| 882501 | 2016 AV_{299} | — | January 4, 2016 | Haleakala | Pan-STARRS 1 | · | 1.5 km | MPC · JPL |
| 882502 | 2016 AR_{300} | — | January 4, 2016 | Haleakala | Pan-STARRS 1 | · | 2.8 km | MPC · JPL |
| 882503 | 2016 AC_{301} | — | January 3, 2016 | Mount Lemmon | Mount Lemmon Survey | · | 2.2 km | MPC · JPL |
| 882504 | 2016 AB_{302} | — | January 8, 2016 | Haleakala | Pan-STARRS 1 | VER | 2.1 km | MPC · JPL |
| 882505 | 2016 AM_{302} | — | January 4, 2016 | Haleakala | Pan-STARRS 1 | · | 790 m | MPC · JPL |
| 882506 | 2016 AP_{302} | — | January 11, 2016 | Haleakala | Pan-STARRS 1 | · | 2.2 km | MPC · JPL |
| 882507 | 2016 AJ_{303} | — | January 8, 2016 | Haleakala | Pan-STARRS 1 | · | 1.9 km | MPC · JPL |
| 882508 | 2016 AA_{307} | — | January 2, 2016 | Mount Lemmon | Mount Lemmon Survey | (5) | 870 m | MPC · JPL |
| 882509 | 2016 AP_{307} | — | January 13, 2016 | Haleakala | Pan-STARRS 1 | · | 2.0 km | MPC · JPL |
| 882510 | 2016 AB_{311} | — | January 13, 2016 | Mount Lemmon | Mount Lemmon Survey | · | 2.3 km | MPC · JPL |
| 882511 | 2016 AR_{311} | — | January 7, 2016 | Haleakala | Pan-STARRS 1 | · | 1.4 km | MPC · JPL |
| 882512 | 2016 AY_{312} | — | January 14, 2016 | Haleakala | Pan-STARRS 1 | · | 2.3 km | MPC · JPL |
| 882513 | 2016 AN_{315} | — | January 11, 2016 | Haleakala | Pan-STARRS 1 | L5 | 7.4 km | MPC · JPL |
| 882514 | 2016 AY_{318} | — | January 4, 2016 | Haleakala | Pan-STARRS 1 | · | 730 m | MPC · JPL |
| 882515 | 2016 AF_{321} | — | January 3, 2016 | Haleakala | Pan-STARRS 1 | BRA | 1.1 km | MPC · JPL |
| 882516 | 2016 AT_{322} | — | January 15, 2016 | Haleakala | Pan-STARRS 1 | · | 2.8 km | MPC · JPL |
| 882517 | 2016 AZ_{322} | — | January 12, 2016 | Haleakala | Pan-STARRS 1 | · | 2.6 km | MPC · JPL |
| 882518 | 2016 AR_{323} | — | January 4, 2016 | Haleakala | Pan-STARRS 1 | · | 1.2 km | MPC · JPL |
| 882519 | 2016 AO_{324} | — | January 14, 2016 | Haleakala | Pan-STARRS 1 | EOS | 1.2 km | MPC · JPL |
| 882520 | 2016 AC_{325} | — | January 3, 2016 | Haleakala | Pan-STARRS 1 | MAS | 480 m | MPC · JPL |
| 882521 | 2016 AN_{325} | — | January 9, 2016 | Haleakala | Pan-STARRS 1 | · | 1.5 km | MPC · JPL |
| 882522 | 2016 AJ_{326} | — | January 11, 2016 | Haleakala | Pan-STARRS 1 | H | 380 m | MPC · JPL |
| 882523 | 2016 AS_{327} | — | January 11, 2016 | Haleakala | Pan-STARRS 1 | · | 2.0 km | MPC · JPL |
| 882524 | 2016 AX_{327} | — | January 7, 2016 | Haleakala | Pan-STARRS 1 | critical | 1.5 km | MPC · JPL |
| 882525 | 2016 AN_{328} | — | January 3, 2016 | Haleakala | Pan-STARRS 1 | · | 2.3 km | MPC · JPL |
| 882526 | 2016 AW_{328} | — | January 13, 2016 | Mount Lemmon | Mount Lemmon Survey | · | 1.0 km | MPC · JPL |
| 882527 | 2016 AE_{330} | — | January 14, 2016 | Haleakala | Pan-STARRS 1 | · | 2.2 km | MPC · JPL |
| 882528 | 2016 AT_{338} | — | January 4, 2016 | Haleakala | Pan-STARRS 1 | LIX | 2.3 km | MPC · JPL |
| 882529 | 2016 AE_{350} | — | January 4, 2016 | Haleakala | Pan-STARRS 1 | L5 | 7.9 km | MPC · JPL |
| 882530 | 2016 AH_{355} | — | January 4, 2016 | Haleakala | Pan-STARRS 1 | · | 2.3 km | MPC · JPL |
| 882531 | 2016 AB_{363} | — | January 7, 2016 | Haleakala | Pan-STARRS 1 | · | 2.3 km | MPC · JPL |
| 882532 | 2016 AA_{366} | — | December 16, 2015 | Mount Lemmon | Mount Lemmon Survey | · | 740 m | MPC · JPL |
| 882533 | 2016 AK_{367} | — | January 2, 2016 | Haleakala | Pan-STARRS 1 | (5) | 690 m | MPC · JPL |
| 882534 | 2016 AA_{369} | — | January 3, 2016 | Haleakala | Pan-STARRS 1 | L5 | 5.9 km | MPC · JPL |
| 882535 | 2016 AO_{370} | — | January 14, 2016 | Haleakala | Pan-STARRS 1 | · | 1.5 km | MPC · JPL |
| 882536 | 2016 AU_{370} | — | January 4, 2016 | Haleakala | Pan-STARRS 1 | · | 2.3 km | MPC · JPL |
| 882537 | 2016 AU_{373} | — | January 2, 2016 | Mount Lemmon | Mount Lemmon Survey | L5 | 7.0 km | MPC · JPL |
| 882538 | 2016 AT_{382} | — | January 4, 2016 | Haleakala | Pan-STARRS 1 | L5 | 6.4 km | MPC · JPL |
| 882539 | 2016 AN_{383} | — | January 4, 2016 | Haleakala | Pan-STARRS 1 | L5 | 6.6 km | MPC · JPL |
| 882540 | 2016 AW_{385} | — | January 5, 2016 | Haleakala | Pan-STARRS 1 | EUN | 780 m | MPC · JPL |
| 882541 | 2016 AB_{393} | — | January 9, 2016 | Haleakala | Pan-STARRS 1 | · | 1.8 km | MPC · JPL |
| 882542 | 2016 AH_{395} | — | January 12, 2016 | Haleakala | Pan-STARRS 1 | L5 | 5.6 km | MPC · JPL |
| 882543 | 2016 AV_{398} | — | January 14, 2016 | Haleakala | Pan-STARRS 1 | L5 | 5.6 km | MPC · JPL |
| 882544 | 2016 AV_{404} | — | January 3, 2016 | Haleakala | Pan-STARRS 1 | L5 | 5.6 km | MPC · JPL |
| 882545 | 2016 AU_{405} | — | January 4, 2016 | Haleakala | Pan-STARRS 1 | · | 1.1 km | MPC · JPL |
| 882546 | 2016 BZ_{2} | — | December 18, 2015 | Mount Lemmon | Mount Lemmon Survey | · | 1.6 km | MPC · JPL |
| 882547 | 2016 BY_{5} | — | January 18, 2016 | Haleakala | Pan-STARRS 1 | · | 1.6 km | MPC · JPL |
| 882548 | 2016 BV_{6} | — | January 8, 2016 | Haleakala | Pan-STARRS 1 | · | 620 m | MPC · JPL |
| 882549 | 2016 BL_{8} | — | January 8, 2016 | Haleakala | Pan-STARRS 1 | · | 1.8 km | MPC · JPL |
| 882550 | 2016 BU_{17} | — | December 7, 2015 | Haleakala | Pan-STARRS 1 | H | 350 m | MPC · JPL |
| 882551 | 2016 BO_{19} | — | January 7, 2016 | Haleakala | Pan-STARRS 1 | EUN | 700 m | MPC · JPL |
| 882552 | 2016 BM_{21} | — | January 8, 2016 | Haleakala | Pan-STARRS 1 | LIX | 2.1 km | MPC · JPL |
| 882553 | 2016 BX_{21} | — | January 8, 2016 | Haleakala | Pan-STARRS 1 | TIR | 2.2 km | MPC · JPL |
| 882554 | 2016 BS_{24} | — | April 11, 2011 | Mount Lemmon | Mount Lemmon Survey | · | 2.0 km | MPC · JPL |
| 882555 | 2016 BE_{26} | — | February 16, 2012 | Haleakala | Pan-STARRS 1 | (5) | 860 m | MPC · JPL |
| 882556 | 2016 BE_{28} | — | February 28, 2010 | WISE | WISE | LIX | 2.0 km | MPC · JPL |
| 882557 | 2016 BE_{29} | — | January 2, 2016 | Haleakala | Pan-STARRS 1 | · | 910 m | MPC · JPL |
| 882558 | 2016 BY_{30} | — | January 7, 2016 | Haleakala | Pan-STARRS 1 | EMA | 2.4 km | MPC · JPL |
| 882559 | 2016 BJ_{39} | — | January 30, 2016 | Mount Lemmon | Mount Lemmon Survey | H | 300 m | MPC · JPL |
| 882560 | 2016 BQ_{40} | — | November 20, 2009 | Kitt Peak | Spacewatch | · | 1.5 km | MPC · JPL |
| 882561 | 2016 BC_{41} | — | December 1, 2008 | Mount Lemmon | Mount Lemmon Survey | · | 500 m | MPC · JPL |
| 882562 | 2016 BQ_{48} | — | January 7, 2016 | Haleakala | Pan-STARRS 1 | · | 2.1 km | MPC · JPL |
| 882563 | 2016 BH_{51} | — | January 3, 2016 | Haleakala | Pan-STARRS 1 | · | 1.9 km | MPC · JPL |
| 882564 | 2016 BN_{51} | — | January 4, 2016 | Haleakala | Pan-STARRS 1 | (2076) | 620 m | MPC · JPL |
| 882565 | 2016 BH_{53} | — | March 8, 2010 | WISE | WISE | · | 2.3 km | MPC · JPL |
| 882566 | 2016 BB_{54} | — | January 17, 2016 | Haleakala | Pan-STARRS 1 | NYS | 720 m | MPC · JPL |
| 882567 | 2016 BA_{55} | — | February 13, 2011 | Mount Lemmon | Mount Lemmon Survey | EOS | 1.4 km | MPC · JPL |
| 882568 | 2016 BY_{67} | — | December 7, 2015 | Haleakala | Pan-STARRS 1 | EUN | 860 m | MPC · JPL |
| 882569 | 2016 BM_{75} | — | February 12, 2011 | Mount Lemmon | Mount Lemmon Survey | · | 1.3 km | MPC · JPL |
| 882570 | 2016 BQ_{75} | — | January 15, 2016 | Haleakala | Pan-STARRS 1 | · | 1.5 km | MPC · JPL |
| 882571 | 2016 BO_{78} | — | January 29, 2016 | Mount Lemmon | Mount Lemmon Survey | EOS | 1.3 km | MPC · JPL |
| 882572 | 2016 BT_{78} | — | August 9, 2013 | Haleakala | Pan-STARRS 1 | · | 1.9 km | MPC · JPL |
| 882573 | 2016 BU_{79} | — | December 1, 2006 | Mount Lemmon | Mount Lemmon Survey | · | 960 m | MPC · JPL |
| 882574 | 2016 BV_{80} | — | January 31, 2016 | Haleakala | Pan-STARRS 1 | · | 650 m | MPC · JPL |
| 882575 | 2016 BY_{81} | — | March 28, 2011 | Mount Lemmon | Mount Lemmon Survey | H | 280 m | MPC · JPL |
| 882576 | 2016 BT_{83} | — | March 4, 2008 | Mount Lemmon | Mount Lemmon Survey | H | 360 m | MPC · JPL |
| 882577 | 2016 BA_{84} | — | January 16, 2016 | Haleakala | Pan-STARRS 1 | · | 1.3 km | MPC · JPL |
| 882578 | 2016 BE_{84} | — | April 10, 2005 | Kitt Peak | Spacewatch | · | 2.1 km | MPC · JPL |
| 882579 | 2016 BH_{84} | — | January 16, 2016 | Haleakala | Pan-STARRS 1 | · | 1.6 km | MPC · JPL |
| 882580 | 2016 BV_{86} | — | January 2, 2016 | Mount Lemmon | Mount Lemmon Survey | VER | 1.9 km | MPC · JPL |
| 882581 | 2016 BH_{95} | — | November 22, 2014 | Mount Lemmon | Mount Lemmon Survey | · | 1.9 km | MPC · JPL |
| 882582 | 2016 BM_{95} | — | January 16, 2016 | Haleakala | Pan-STARRS 1 | · | 1.9 km | MPC · JPL |
| 882583 | 2016 BP_{99} | — | January 17, 2016 | Haleakala | Pan-STARRS 1 | · | 1.1 km | MPC · JPL |
| 882584 | 2016 BG_{100} | — | January 18, 2016 | Haleakala | Pan-STARRS 1 | · | 2.6 km | MPC · JPL |
| 882585 | 2016 BL_{103} | — | January 29, 2016 | Mount Lemmon | Mount Lemmon Survey | · | 1.6 km | MPC · JPL |
| 882586 | 2016 BL_{104} | — | January 30, 2016 | Mount Lemmon | Mount Lemmon Survey | · | 1.1 km | MPC · JPL |
| 882587 | 2016 BA_{106} | — | January 19, 2016 | Haleakala | Pan-STARRS 1 | H | 490 m | MPC · JPL |
| 882588 | 2016 BR_{106} | — | January 29, 2016 | Mount Lemmon | Mount Lemmon Survey | · | 2.4 km | MPC · JPL |
| 882589 | 2016 BU_{109} | — | January 18, 2016 | Mount Lemmon | Mount Lemmon Survey | H | 450 m | MPC · JPL |
| 882590 | 2016 BL_{110} | — | January 17, 2016 | Haleakala | Pan-STARRS 1 | · | 2.1 km | MPC · JPL |
| 882591 | 2016 BV_{110} | — | January 21, 2016 | Haleakala | Pan-STARRS 1 | · | 1.5 km | MPC · JPL |
| 882592 | 2016 BE_{111} | — | January 16, 2016 | Haleakala | Pan-STARRS 1 | · | 2.3 km | MPC · JPL |
| 882593 | 2016 BA_{115} | — | January 16, 2016 | Haleakala | Pan-STARRS 1 | · | 1.8 km | MPC · JPL |
| 882594 | 2016 BG_{118} | — | January 17, 2016 | Haleakala | Pan-STARRS 1 | · | 2.4 km | MPC · JPL |
| 882595 | 2016 BL_{118} | — | January 19, 2016 | Haleakala | Pan-STARRS 1 | · | 1.7 km | MPC · JPL |
| 882596 | 2016 BC_{121} | — | January 29, 2016 | Mount Lemmon | Mount Lemmon Survey | · | 1.1 km | MPC · JPL |
| 882597 | 2016 BP_{122} | — | January 17, 2016 | Haleakala | Pan-STARRS 1 | · | 2.0 km | MPC · JPL |
| 882598 | 2016 BQ_{123} | — | January 31, 2016 | Haleakala | Pan-STARRS 1 | EOS | 1.2 km | MPC · JPL |
| 882599 | 2016 BT_{128} | — | January 30, 2016 | Mount Lemmon | Mount Lemmon Survey | · | 2.3 km | MPC · JPL |
| 882600 | 2016 BF_{133} | — | January 31, 2016 | Haleakala | Pan-STARRS 1 | NYS | 880 m | MPC · JPL |

== 882601–882700 ==
back to top

| Designation | | | Discovery | | | Properties | | Ref |
| Permanent | Provisional | Named after | Date | Site | Discoverer(s) | Category | Diam. | Ref |
|---|---|---|---|---|---|---|---|---|
| 882601 | 2016 BZ_{135} | — | January 30, 2016 | Mount Lemmon | Mount Lemmon Survey | · | 2.1 km | MPC · JPL |
| 882602 | 2016 BW_{139} | — | November 21, 2014 | Haleakala | Pan-STARRS 1 | · | 2.4 km | MPC · JPL |
| 882603 | 2016 BB_{141} | — | January 31, 2016 | Mount Lemmon | Mount Lemmon Survey | L5 | 5.9 km | MPC · JPL |
| 882604 | 2016 CE_{2} | — | February 25, 2011 | Mount Lemmon | Mount Lemmon Survey | · | 1.5 km | MPC · JPL |
| 882605 | 2016 CM_{7} | — | April 30, 2006 | Kitt Peak | Spacewatch | · | 1.6 km | MPC · JPL |
| 882606 | 2016 CG_{9} | — | December 17, 2015 | Mount Lemmon | Mount Lemmon Survey | · | 1.2 km | MPC · JPL |
| 882607 | 2016 CJ_{15} | — | January 9, 2016 | Haleakala | Pan-STARRS 1 | · | 2.1 km | MPC · JPL |
| 882608 | 2016 CA_{18} | — | June 24, 2014 | Haleakala | Pan-STARRS 1 | H | 290 m | MPC · JPL |
| 882609 | 2016 CU_{21} | — | October 24, 2011 | Haleakala | Pan-STARRS 1 | · | 550 m | MPC · JPL |
| 882610 | 2016 CF_{26} | — | February 3, 2009 | Mount Lemmon | Mount Lemmon Survey | PHO | 970 m | MPC · JPL |
| 882611 | 2016 CC_{27} | — | October 7, 2011 | Westfield | International Astronomical Search Collaboration | · | 570 m | MPC · JPL |
| 882612 | 2016 CM_{35} | — | September 30, 2006 | Mount Lemmon | Mount Lemmon Survey | · | 720 m | MPC · JPL |
| 882613 | 2016 CQ_{39} | — | December 2, 2008 | Kitt Peak | Spacewatch | · | 470 m | MPC · JPL |
| 882614 | 2016 CR_{41} | — | September 25, 2003 | Palomar | NEAT | · | 2.6 km | MPC · JPL |
| 882615 | 2016 CT_{41} | — | January 30, 2016 | Mount Lemmon | Mount Lemmon Survey | V | 380 m | MPC · JPL |
| 882616 | 2016 CQ_{44} | — | November 21, 2014 | Haleakala | Pan-STARRS 1 | · | 2.1 km | MPC · JPL |
| 882617 | 2016 CZ_{44} | — | January 14, 2016 | Haleakala | Pan-STARRS 1 | LIX | 2.6 km | MPC · JPL |
| 882618 | 2016 CE_{46} | — | November 12, 2006 | Mount Lemmon | Mount Lemmon Survey | · | 830 m | MPC · JPL |
| 882619 | 2016 CC_{48} | — | January 8, 2016 | Haleakala | Pan-STARRS 1 | · | 1.8 km | MPC · JPL |
| 882620 | 2016 CY_{48} | — | August 15, 2013 | Haleakala | Pan-STARRS 1 | · | 2.3 km | MPC · JPL |
| 882621 | 2016 CL_{50} | — | February 3, 2016 | Haleakala | Pan-STARRS 1 | EOS | 1.4 km | MPC · JPL |
| 882622 | 2016 CS_{51} | — | January 31, 2016 | Haleakala | Pan-STARRS 1 | · | 810 m | MPC · JPL |
| 882623 | 2016 CJ_{52} | — | February 3, 2016 | Haleakala | Pan-STARRS 1 | VER | 2.0 km | MPC · JPL |
| 882624 | 2016 CW_{54} | — | February 3, 2016 | Haleakala | Pan-STARRS 1 | · | 1.7 km | MPC · JPL |
| 882625 | 2016 CZ_{57} | — | February 3, 2016 | Haleakala | Pan-STARRS 1 | · | 2.1 km | MPC · JPL |
| 882626 | 2016 CT_{62} | — | February 3, 2016 | Haleakala | Pan-STARRS 1 | · | 1.4 km | MPC · JPL |
| 882627 | 2016 CE_{65} | — | November 24, 2006 | Mount Lemmon | Mount Lemmon Survey | · | 830 m | MPC · JPL |
| 882628 | 2016 CA_{70} | — | January 19, 2008 | Mount Lemmon | Mount Lemmon Survey | H | 360 m | MPC · JPL |
| 882629 | 2016 CS_{79} | — | January 9, 2016 | Haleakala | Pan-STARRS 1 | TIR · critical | 1.6 km | MPC · JPL |
| 882630 | 2016 CM_{80} | — | February 5, 2016 | Haleakala | Pan-STARRS 1 | · | 1.4 km | MPC · JPL |
| 882631 | 2016 CY_{82} | — | February 5, 2016 | Haleakala | Pan-STARRS 1 | EOS | 1.2 km | MPC · JPL |
| 882632 | 2016 CC_{89} | — | November 15, 2003 | Kitt Peak | Spacewatch | · | 3.2 km | MPC · JPL |
| 882633 | 2016 CC_{91} | — | February 5, 2016 | Haleakala | Pan-STARRS 1 | · | 830 m | MPC · JPL |
| 882634 | 2016 CG_{93} | — | April 7, 2006 | Kitt Peak | Spacewatch | · | 1.8 km | MPC · JPL |
| 882635 | 2016 CA_{95} | — | January 15, 2010 | Kitt Peak | Spacewatch | · | 3.0 km | MPC · JPL |
| 882636 | 2016 CK_{96} | — | July 1, 2013 | Haleakala | Pan-STARRS 1 | · | 1.1 km | MPC · JPL |
| 882637 | 2016 CV_{97} | — | February 5, 2016 | Haleakala | Pan-STARRS 1 | · | 2.1 km | MPC · JPL |
| 882638 | 2016 CD_{98} | — | January 4, 2016 | Haleakala | Pan-STARRS 1 | · | 2.3 km | MPC · JPL |
| 882639 | 2016 CS_{102} | — | February 5, 2016 | Haleakala | Pan-STARRS 1 | · | 2.2 km | MPC · JPL |
| 882640 | 2016 CF_{106} | — | December 9, 2015 | Haleakala | Pan-STARRS 1 | · | 2.3 km | MPC · JPL |
| 882641 | 2016 CJ_{118} | — | July 15, 2013 | Haleakala | Pan-STARRS 1 | · | 2.1 km | MPC · JPL |
| 882642 | 2016 CM_{120} | — | January 17, 2016 | Haleakala | Pan-STARRS 1 | · | 2.4 km | MPC · JPL |
| 882643 | 2016 CD_{131} | — | February 5, 2016 | Haleakala | Pan-STARRS 1 | · | 610 m | MPC · JPL |
| 882644 | 2016 CR_{132} | — | March 5, 2006 | Mount Lemmon | Mount Lemmon Survey | · | 1.1 km | MPC · JPL |
| 882645 | 2016 CW_{134} | — | February 3, 2011 | Piszkés-tető | K. Sárneczky, Z. Kuli | · | 1.3 km | MPC · JPL |
| 882646 | 2016 CH_{135} | — | July 25, 2014 | Haleakala | Pan-STARRS 1 | · | 950 m | MPC · JPL |
| 882647 | 2016 CN_{135} | — | February 5, 2016 | Haleakala | Pan-STARRS 1 | · | 1.9 km | MPC · JPL |
| 882648 | 2016 CW_{135} | — | February 6, 2016 | Mount Lemmon | Mount Lemmon Survey | · | 2.0 km | MPC · JPL |
| 882649 | 2016 CE_{139} | — | April 12, 2011 | Mount Lemmon | Mount Lemmon Survey | · | 1.8 km | MPC · JPL |
| 882650 | 2016 CP_{139} | — | October 24, 2009 | Kitt Peak | Spacewatch | · | 1.3 km | MPC · JPL |
| 882651 | 2016 CU_{141} | — | January 4, 2016 | Haleakala | Pan-STARRS 1 | · | 1.9 km | MPC · JPL |
| 882652 | 2016 CD_{157} | — | September 20, 2014 | Haleakala | Pan-STARRS 1 | · | 2.1 km | MPC · JPL |
| 882653 | 2016 CR_{158} | — | January 3, 2016 | Haleakala | Pan-STARRS 1 | · | 1.6 km | MPC · JPL |
| 882654 | 2016 CY_{158} | — | July 26, 2011 | Haleakala | Pan-STARRS 1 | PHO | 620 m | MPC · JPL |
| 882655 | 2016 CN_{163} | — | December 18, 2015 | Mount Lemmon | Mount Lemmon Survey | · | 2.0 km | MPC · JPL |
| 882656 | 2016 CX_{166} | — | January 4, 2016 | Haleakala | Pan-STARRS 1 | · | 2.9 km | MPC · JPL |
| 882657 | 2016 CF_{177} | — | January 9, 2016 | Haleakala | Pan-STARRS 1 | · | 2.0 km | MPC · JPL |
| 882658 | 2016 CW_{178} | — | January 12, 2016 | Haleakala | Pan-STARRS 1 | (5651) | 2.2 km | MPC · JPL |
| 882659 | 2016 CA_{179} | — | January 31, 2016 | Mount Lemmon | Mount Lemmon Survey | · | 1.4 km | MPC · JPL |
| 882660 | 2016 CV_{179} | — | February 9, 2016 | Haleakala | Pan-STARRS 1 | EOS | 1.1 km | MPC · JPL |
| 882661 | 2016 CR_{188} | — | February 3, 2016 | Haleakala | Pan-STARRS 1 | · | 1.4 km | MPC · JPL |
| 882662 | 2016 CH_{189} | — | February 9, 2016 | Haleakala | Pan-STARRS 1 | · | 2.2 km | MPC · JPL |
| 882663 | 2016 CB_{192} | — | November 22, 2015 | Mount Lemmon | Mount Lemmon Survey | · | 520 m | MPC · JPL |
| 882664 | 2016 CB_{193} | — | February 1, 2016 | Haleakala | Pan-STARRS 1 | H | 320 m | MPC · JPL |
| 882665 | 2016 CF_{193} | — | March 13, 2012 | Kitt Peak | Spacewatch | · | 1.1 km | MPC · JPL |
| 882666 | 2016 CJ_{194} | — | January 10, 2016 | Haleakala | Pan-STARRS 1 | H | 400 m | MPC · JPL |
| 882667 | 2016 CY_{195} | — | January 26, 2010 | WISE | WISE | · | 1.3 km | MPC · JPL |
| 882668 | 2016 CF_{203} | — | February 9, 2016 | Haleakala | Pan-STARRS 1 | THM | 1.8 km | MPC · JPL |
| 882669 | 2016 CB_{205} | — | December 9, 2015 | Haleakala | Pan-STARRS 1 | · | 2.1 km | MPC · JPL |
| 882670 | 2016 CK_{208} | — | February 9, 2016 | Haleakala | Pan-STARRS 1 | · | 1.7 km | MPC · JPL |
| 882671 | 2016 CV_{209} | — | February 9, 2016 | Haleakala | Pan-STARRS 1 | · | 1.8 km | MPC · JPL |
| 882672 | 2016 CV_{211} | — | February 4, 2000 | Kitt Peak | Spacewatch | · | 1.4 km | MPC · JPL |
| 882673 | 2016 CJ_{220} | — | February 9, 2016 | Haleakala | Pan-STARRS 1 | · | 2.4 km | MPC · JPL |
| 882674 | 2016 CW_{221} | — | September 1, 2013 | Mount Lemmon | Mount Lemmon Survey | URS | 2.3 km | MPC · JPL |
| 882675 | 2016 CA_{225} | — | February 10, 2016 | Haleakala | Pan-STARRS 1 | · | 2.1 km | MPC · JPL |
| 882676 | 2016 CL_{228} | — | January 21, 2016 | Mount Lemmon | Mount Lemmon Survey | · | 2.3 km | MPC · JPL |
| 882677 | 2016 CK_{236} | — | October 26, 2011 | Haleakala | Pan-STARRS 1 | · | 740 m | MPC · JPL |
| 882678 | 2016 CW_{241} | — | September 20, 2014 | Haleakala | Pan-STARRS 1 | · | 1.7 km | MPC · JPL |
| 882679 | 2016 CM_{242} | — | November 10, 2014 | Haleakala | Pan-STARRS 1 | · | 1.5 km | MPC · JPL |
| 882680 | 2016 CR_{242} | — | March 12, 2011 | Mount Lemmon | Mount Lemmon Survey | · | 2.1 km | MPC · JPL |
| 882681 | 2016 CU_{242} | — | April 22, 2011 | Kitt Peak | Spacewatch | · | 2.2 km | MPC · JPL |
| 882682 | 2016 CY_{242} | — | March 26, 2010 | WISE | WISE | · | 2.0 km | MPC · JPL |
| 882683 | 2016 CP_{251} | — | February 10, 2016 | Mount Lemmon | Mount Lemmon Survey | critical | 720 m | MPC · JPL |
| 882684 | 2016 CA_{255} | — | December 13, 2010 | Mount Lemmon | Mount Lemmon Survey | · | 1.2 km | MPC · JPL |
| 882685 | 2016 CK_{255} | — | December 12, 2015 | Haleakala | Pan-STARRS 1 | TIR · critical | 1.6 km | MPC · JPL |
| 882686 | 2016 CB_{258} | — | January 14, 2016 | Haleakala | Pan-STARRS 1 | · | 1.8 km | MPC · JPL |
| 882687 | 2016 CF_{265} | — | January 9, 2016 | Haleakala | Pan-STARRS 1 | H | 340 m | MPC · JPL |
| 882688 | 2016 CE_{269} | — | February 3, 2016 | Haleakala | Pan-STARRS 1 | · | 1.5 km | MPC · JPL |
| 882689 | 2016 CO_{270} | — | February 5, 2016 | Mount Lemmon | Mount Lemmon Survey | · | 2.1 km | MPC · JPL |
| 882690 | 2016 CG_{271} | — | February 5, 2016 | Haleakala | Pan-STARRS 1 | · | 2.4 km | MPC · JPL |
| 882691 | 2016 CG_{272} | — | February 10, 2011 | Mount Lemmon | Mount Lemmon Survey | · | 1.3 km | MPC · JPL |
| 882692 | 2016 CA_{275} | — | February 10, 2016 | Haleakala | Pan-STARRS 1 | · | 1.9 km | MPC · JPL |
| 882693 | 2016 CB_{276} | — | February 11, 2016 | Haleakala | Pan-STARRS 1 | EOS | 1.5 km | MPC · JPL |
| 882694 | 2016 CW_{276} | — | February 19, 2010 | Kitt Peak | Spacewatch | · | 3.1 km | MPC · JPL |
| 882695 | 2016 CB_{277} | — | February 11, 2016 | Haleakala | Pan-STARRS 1 | · | 2.0 km | MPC · JPL |
| 882696 | 2016 CF_{278} | — | March 10, 2005 | Mount Lemmon | Mount Lemmon Survey | · | 1.7 km | MPC · JPL |
| 882697 | 2016 CU_{282} | — | September 13, 2007 | Mount Lemmon | Mount Lemmon Survey | URS | 2.2 km | MPC · JPL |
| 882698 | 2016 CJ_{295} | — | October 29, 2014 | Haleakala | Pan-STARRS 1 | EOS | 1.4 km | MPC · JPL |
| 882699 | 2016 CG_{301} | — | February 5, 2016 | Haleakala | Pan-STARRS 1 | · | 700 m | MPC · JPL |
| 882700 | 2016 CL_{302} | — | July 30, 2008 | Kitt Peak | Spacewatch | · | 1.9 km | MPC · JPL |

== 882701–882800 ==
back to top

| Designation | | | Discovery | | | Properties | | Ref |
| Permanent | Provisional | Named after | Date | Site | Discoverer(s) | Category | Diam. | Ref |
|---|---|---|---|---|---|---|---|---|
| 882701 | 2016 CW_{304} | — | February 5, 2016 | Haleakala | Pan-STARRS 1 | EOS | 1.5 km | MPC · JPL |
| 882702 | 2016 CO_{305} | — | December 16, 2009 | Mount Lemmon | Mount Lemmon Survey | LIX | 2.4 km | MPC · JPL |
| 882703 | 2016 CF_{307} | — | February 6, 2016 | Haleakala | Pan-STARRS 1 | · | 1.8 km | MPC · JPL |
| 882704 | 2016 CP_{310} | — | August 17, 2012 | Haleakala | Pan-STARRS 1 | · | 2.1 km | MPC · JPL |
| 882705 | 2016 CB_{315} | — | March 4, 2010 | Kitt Peak | Spacewatch | · | 1.9 km | MPC · JPL |
| 882706 | 2016 CS_{319} | — | January 20, 2015 | Haleakala | Pan-STARRS 1 | · | 2.0 km | MPC · JPL |
| 882707 | 2016 CR_{320} | — | October 4, 2014 | Haleakala | Pan-STARRS 1 | TIR | 2.1 km | MPC · JPL |
| 882708 | 2016 CB_{324} | — | February 14, 2016 | Haleakala | Pan-STARRS 1 | · | 2.2 km | MPC · JPL |
| 882709 | 2016 CE_{324} | — | February 9, 2016 | Mount Lemmon | Mount Lemmon Survey | EOS | 1.4 km | MPC · JPL |
| 882710 | 2016 CE_{327} | — | February 5, 2016 | Haleakala | Pan-STARRS 1 | · | 1.9 km | MPC · JPL |
| 882711 | 2016 CL_{327} | — | February 5, 2016 | Haleakala | Pan-STARRS 1 | VER | 2.0 km | MPC · JPL |
| 882712 | 2016 CH_{329} | — | February 10, 2016 | Haleakala | Pan-STARRS 1 | · | 1.1 km | MPC · JPL |
| 882713 | 2016 CA_{330} | — | February 9, 2016 | Haleakala | Pan-STARRS 1 | · | 1.6 km | MPC · JPL |
| 882714 | 2016 CR_{330} | — | February 10, 2016 | Haleakala | Pan-STARRS 1 | · | 2.6 km | MPC · JPL |
| 882715 | 2016 CA_{331} | — | February 6, 2016 | Haleakala | Pan-STARRS 1 | EOS | 1.2 km | MPC · JPL |
| 882716 | 2016 CF_{331} | — | May 4, 2010 | WISE | WISE | · | 2.3 km | MPC · JPL |
| 882717 | 2016 CK_{331} | — | February 5, 2016 | Haleakala | Pan-STARRS 1 | TIR | 2.2 km | MPC · JPL |
| 882718 | 2016 CD_{332} | — | February 9, 2016 | Haleakala | Pan-STARRS 1 | · | 1.3 km | MPC · JPL |
| 882719 | 2016 CO_{332} | — | February 11, 2016 | Haleakala | Pan-STARRS 1 | · | 1.9 km | MPC · JPL |
| 882720 | 2016 CA_{333} | — | February 5, 2016 | Haleakala | Pan-STARRS 1 | VER | 2.2 km | MPC · JPL |
| 882721 | 2016 CH_{333} | — | February 5, 2016 | Haleakala | Pan-STARRS 1 | · | 2.2 km | MPC · JPL |
| 882722 | 2016 CJ_{333} | — | February 10, 2016 | Haleakala | Pan-STARRS 1 | · | 1.2 km | MPC · JPL |
| 882723 | 2016 CV_{333} | — | February 11, 2016 | Haleakala | Pan-STARRS 1 | · | 2.4 km | MPC · JPL |
| 882724 | 2016 CH_{334} | — | February 1, 2016 | Haleakala | Pan-STARRS 1 | · | 1.2 km | MPC · JPL |
| 882725 | 2016 CV_{334} | — | February 5, 2016 | Haleakala | Pan-STARRS 1 | · | 2.1 km | MPC · JPL |
| 882726 | 2016 CG_{335} | — | February 1, 2016 | Haleakala | Pan-STARRS 1 | · | 3.1 km | MPC · JPL |
| 882727 | 2016 CL_{335} | — | February 12, 2016 | Haleakala | Pan-STARRS 1 | · | 1.4 km | MPC · JPL |
| 882728 | 2016 CV_{336} | — | February 12, 2016 | Haleakala | Pan-STARRS 1 | · | 1.9 km | MPC · JPL |
| 882729 | 2016 CA_{338} | — | February 6, 2016 | Haleakala | Pan-STARRS 1 | EOS | 1.2 km | MPC · JPL |
| 882730 | 2016 CD_{338} | — | February 9, 2016 | Haleakala | Pan-STARRS 1 | · | 1.1 km | MPC · JPL |
| 882731 | 2016 CS_{343} | — | February 11, 2016 | Haleakala | Pan-STARRS 1 | EOS | 1.3 km | MPC · JPL |
| 882732 | 2016 CF_{345} | — | February 9, 2016 | Haleakala | Pan-STARRS 1 | · | 1.2 km | MPC · JPL |
| 882733 | 2016 CF_{347} | — | February 9, 2016 | Haleakala | Pan-STARRS 1 | · | 770 m | MPC · JPL |
| 882734 | 2016 CM_{349} | — | February 5, 2016 | Haleakala | Pan-STARRS 1 | HYG | 2.2 km | MPC · JPL |
| 882735 | 2016 CR_{350} | — | February 11, 2016 | Haleakala | Pan-STARRS 1 | · | 1.2 km | MPC · JPL |
| 882736 | 2016 CY_{350} | — | February 1, 2016 | Haleakala | Pan-STARRS 1 | · | 2.6 km | MPC · JPL |
| 882737 | 2016 CY_{351} | — | February 10, 2016 | Haleakala | Pan-STARRS 1 | · | 2.2 km | MPC · JPL |
| 882738 | 2016 CD_{352} | — | February 11, 2016 | Haleakala | Pan-STARRS 1 | LUT | 2.9 km | MPC · JPL |
| 882739 | 2016 CB_{355} | — | February 11, 2016 | Haleakala | Pan-STARRS 1 | · | 2.4 km | MPC · JPL |
| 882740 | 2016 CC_{357} | — | February 5, 2016 | Haleakala | Pan-STARRS 1 | · | 490 m | MPC · JPL |
| 882741 | 2016 CQ_{359} | — | February 5, 2016 | Haleakala | Pan-STARRS 1 | · | 2.4 km | MPC · JPL |
| 882742 | 2016 CL_{366} | — | February 3, 2016 | Haleakala | Pan-STARRS 1 | · | 2.7 km | MPC · JPL |
| 882743 | 2016 CS_{366} | — | February 5, 2016 | Haleakala | Pan-STARRS 1 | · | 1.7 km | MPC · JPL |
| 882744 | 2016 CR_{369} | — | February 10, 2016 | Haleakala | Pan-STARRS 1 | · | 2.0 km | MPC · JPL |
| 882745 | 2016 CH_{372} | — | February 11, 2016 | Haleakala | Pan-STARRS 1 | · | 2.2 km | MPC · JPL |
| 882746 | 2016 CJ_{372} | — | February 11, 2016 | Haleakala | Pan-STARRS 1 | EOS | 1.3 km | MPC · JPL |
| 882747 | 2016 CT_{372} | — | February 5, 2016 | Haleakala | Pan-STARRS 1 | · | 960 m | MPC · JPL |
| 882748 | 2016 CQ_{373} | — | February 3, 2016 | Haleakala | Pan-STARRS 1 | EOS | 1.3 km | MPC · JPL |
| 882749 | 2016 CD_{377} | — | February 6, 2016 | Haleakala | Pan-STARRS 1 | critical | 1.0 km | MPC · JPL |
| 882750 | 2016 CJ_{383} | — | February 6, 2016 | Haleakala | Pan-STARRS 1 | EOS | 1.5 km | MPC · JPL |
| 882751 | 2016 CO_{387} | — | February 10, 2016 | Haleakala | Pan-STARRS 1 | · | 850 m | MPC · JPL |
| 882752 | 2016 CB_{389} | — | February 5, 2016 | Haleakala | Pan-STARRS 1 | · | 1.3 km | MPC · JPL |
| 882753 | 2016 CN_{391} | — | December 31, 2015 | Haleakala | Pan-STARRS 1 | (895) | 2.3 km | MPC · JPL |
| 882754 | 2016 CQ_{391} | — | February 6, 2016 | Haleakala | Pan-STARRS 1 | T_{j} (2.96) | 3.2 km | MPC · JPL |
| 882755 | 2016 CW_{391} | — | January 31, 2016 | Haleakala | Pan-STARRS 1 | · | 2.9 km | MPC · JPL |
| 882756 | 2016 CN_{393} | — | February 9, 2016 | Mount Lemmon | Mount Lemmon Survey | · | 540 m | MPC · JPL |
| 882757 | 2016 CQ_{398} | — | February 2, 2016 | Haleakala | Pan-STARRS 1 | · | 2.2 km | MPC · JPL |
| 882758 | 2016 CD_{409} | — | February 10, 2016 | Mount Lemmon | Mount Lemmon Survey | EUP | 2.5 km | MPC · JPL |
| 882759 | 2016 CM_{423} | — | December 20, 2014 | Haleakala | Pan-STARRS 1 | · | 2.1 km | MPC · JPL |
| 882760 | 2016 DQ | — | February 22, 2016 | WISE | WISE | · | 1.4 km | MPC · JPL |
| 882761 | 2016 DJ_{5} | — | February 9, 2005 | Mount Lemmon | Mount Lemmon Survey | THM | 1.7 km | MPC · JPL |
| 882762 | 2016 DZ_{5} | — | January 11, 2016 | Haleakala | Pan-STARRS 1 | H | 280 m | MPC · JPL |
| 882763 | 2016 DC_{7} | — | February 27, 2016 | Mount Lemmon | Mount Lemmon Survey | · | 600 m | MPC · JPL |
| 882764 | 2016 DG_{10} | — | March 8, 2005 | Mount Lemmon | Mount Lemmon Survey | · | 2.0 km | MPC · JPL |
| 882765 | 2016 DA_{14} | — | December 13, 2015 | Haleakala | Pan-STARRS 1 | · | 1.0 km | MPC · JPL |
| 882766 | 2016 DP_{18} | — | February 10, 2016 | Haleakala | Pan-STARRS 1 | · | 1.4 km | MPC · JPL |
| 882767 | 2016 DP_{20} | — | March 26, 2001 | Kitt Peak | Deep Ecliptic Survey | · | 850 m | MPC · JPL |
| 882768 | 2016 DT_{20} | — | September 23, 2008 | Mount Lemmon | Mount Lemmon Survey | EUP | 3.0 km | MPC · JPL |
| 882769 | 2016 DS_{22} | — | February 27, 2016 | Mount Lemmon | Mount Lemmon Survey | MAS | 490 m | MPC · JPL |
| 882770 | 2016 DC_{25} | — | April 12, 2011 | Mount Lemmon | Mount Lemmon Survey | · | 1.9 km | MPC · JPL |
| 882771 | 2016 DF_{26} | — | November 17, 2014 | Mount Lemmon | Mount Lemmon Survey | THM | 1.6 km | MPC · JPL |
| 882772 | 2016 DT_{27} | — | January 30, 2016 | Catalina | CSS | PHO | 720 m | MPC · JPL |
| 882773 | 2016 DF_{28} | — | March 10, 2010 | WISE | WISE | LIX | 2.6 km | MPC · JPL |
| 882774 | 2016 DK_{28} | — | February 3, 2016 | Haleakala | Pan-STARRS 1 | · | 1.4 km | MPC · JPL |
| 882775 | 2016 DS_{31} | — | February 18, 2016 | Haleakala | Pan-STARRS 1 | PHO | 770 m | MPC · JPL |
| 882776 | 2016 DS_{33} | — | February 26, 2016 | Mount Lemmon | Mount Lemmon Survey | · | 2.1 km | MPC · JPL |
| 882777 | 2016 DM_{34} | — | November 25, 2014 | Haleakala | Pan-STARRS 1 | · | 1.8 km | MPC · JPL |
| 882778 | 2016 DX_{35} | — | February 28, 2016 | Haleakala | Pan-STARRS 1 | · | 530 m | MPC · JPL |
| 882779 | 2016 DM_{36} | — | February 27, 2016 | Mount Lemmon | Mount Lemmon Survey | · | 930 m | MPC · JPL |
| 882780 | 2016 DX_{36} | — | April 7, 2017 | Haleakala | Pan-STARRS 1 | TIR | 2.4 km | MPC · JPL |
| 882781 | 2016 DL_{38} | — | February 29, 2016 | Haleakala | Pan-STARRS 1 | · | 1.6 km | MPC · JPL |
| 882782 | 2016 EN_{1} | — | March 1, 2016 | Haleakala | Pan-STARRS 1 | AMO | 180 m | MPC · JPL |
| 882783 | 2016 EY_{2} | — | February 5, 2016 | Haleakala | Pan-STARRS 1 | · | 1.9 km | MPC · JPL |
| 882784 | 2016 EF_{3} | — | January 4, 2016 | Haleakala | Pan-STARRS 1 | H | 300 m | MPC · JPL |
| 882785 | 2016 EM_{3} | — | January 2, 2016 | Mount Lemmon | Mount Lemmon Survey | · | 1.3 km | MPC · JPL |
| 882786 | 2016 EJ_{7} | — | February 14, 2016 | Mount Lemmon | Mount Lemmon Survey | PHO | 680 m | MPC · JPL |
| 882787 | 2016 EV_{7} | — | October 1, 2008 | Mount Lemmon | Mount Lemmon Survey | · | 2.4 km | MPC · JPL |
| 882788 | 2016 EG_{11} | — | March 3, 2016 | Haleakala | Pan-STARRS 1 | · | 900 m | MPC · JPL |
| 882789 | 2016 EZ_{12} | — | February 4, 2016 | Haleakala | Pan-STARRS 1 | · | 1.9 km | MPC · JPL |
| 882790 | 2016 EO_{15} | — | March 3, 2016 | Haleakala | Pan-STARRS 1 | EUN | 810 m | MPC · JPL |
| 882791 | 2016 EQ_{18} | — | May 9, 2011 | Mount Lemmon | Mount Lemmon Survey | · | 1.7 km | MPC · JPL |
| 882792 | 2016 EJ_{19} | — | January 8, 2016 | Haleakala | Pan-STARRS 1 | · | 2.5 km | MPC · JPL |
| 882793 | 2016 EX_{19} | — | March 3, 2016 | Haleakala | Pan-STARRS 1 | · | 2.2 km | MPC · JPL |
| 882794 | 2016 EQ_{20} | — | February 12, 2016 | Haleakala | Pan-STARRS 1 | · | 750 m | MPC · JPL |
| 882795 | 2016 EJ_{21} | — | March 3, 2016 | Haleakala | Pan-STARRS 1 | · | 2.2 km | MPC · JPL |
| 882796 | 2016 EC_{23} | — | February 12, 2016 | Haleakala | Pan-STARRS 1 | · | 1.2 km | MPC · JPL |
| 882797 | 2016 EG_{24} | — | March 3, 2016 | Haleakala | Pan-STARRS 1 | · | 2.1 km | MPC · JPL |
| 882798 | 2016 ES_{27} | — | March 2, 2016 | Haleakala | Pan-STARRS 1 | · | 810 m | MPC · JPL |
| 882799 | 2016 ER_{29} | — | March 2, 2016 | Haleakala | Pan-STARRS 1 | · | 1.3 km | MPC · JPL |
| 882800 | 2016 EM_{33} | — | March 3, 2016 | Haleakala | Pan-STARRS 1 | · | 2.2 km | MPC · JPL |

== 882801–882900 ==
back to top

| Designation | | | Discovery | | | Properties | | Ref |
| Permanent | Provisional | Named after | Date | Site | Discoverer(s) | Category | Diam. | Ref |
|---|---|---|---|---|---|---|---|---|
| 882801 | 2016 EW_{35} | — | January 18, 2015 | Haleakala | Pan-STARRS 1 | · | 2.6 km | MPC · JPL |
| 882802 | 2016 ES_{38} | — | January 7, 2016 | Haleakala | Pan-STARRS 1 | · | 1.6 km | MPC · JPL |
| 882803 | 2016 EL_{41} | — | October 2, 2014 | Haleakala | Pan-STARRS 1 | · | 1.9 km | MPC · JPL |
| 882804 | 2016 ER_{41} | — | January 29, 2016 | Haleakala | Pan-STARRS 1 | · | 2.4 km | MPC · JPL |
| 882805 | 2016 EE_{43} | — | January 4, 2016 | Haleakala | Pan-STARRS 1 | · | 770 m | MPC · JPL |
| 882806 | 2016 EO_{43} | — | December 12, 2015 | Haleakala | Pan-STARRS 1 | · | 1.4 km | MPC · JPL |
| 882807 | 2016 EW_{46} | — | January 8, 2016 | Haleakala | Pan-STARRS 1 | · | 1.8 km | MPC · JPL |
| 882808 | 2016 EE_{52} | — | March 4, 2016 | Haleakala | Pan-STARRS 1 | · | 2.3 km | MPC · JPL |
| 882809 | 2016 EM_{53} | — | March 3, 2016 | Haleakala | Pan-STARRS 1 | · | 1.9 km | MPC · JPL |
| 882810 | 2016 EQ_{53} | — | May 23, 2010 | WISE | WISE | · | 2.4 km | MPC · JPL |
| 882811 | 2016 EE_{56} | — | March 7, 2016 | Haleakala | Pan-STARRS 1 | · | 350 m | MPC · JPL |
| 882812 | 2016 EL_{57} | — | March 21, 2010 | Catalina | CSS | T_{j} (2.97) | 3.4 km | MPC · JPL |
| 882813 | 2016 EN_{58} | — | January 15, 2016 | Haleakala | Pan-STARRS 1 | · | 3.1 km | MPC · JPL |
| 882814 | 2016 EE_{59} | — | October 16, 2009 | Mount Lemmon | Mount Lemmon Survey | · | 1.9 km | MPC · JPL |
| 882815 | 2016 EZ_{60} | — | October 17, 2014 | Mount Lemmon | Mount Lemmon Survey | · | 1.7 km | MPC · JPL |
| 882816 | 2016 EQ_{63} | — | January 18, 2016 | Haleakala | Pan-STARRS 1 | · | 1.7 km | MPC · JPL |
| 882817 | 2016 ED_{67} | — | March 1, 2016 | Mount Lemmon | Mount Lemmon Survey | VER | 2.0 km | MPC · JPL |
| 882818 | 2016 EB_{68} | — | January 4, 2016 | Haleakala | Pan-STARRS 1 | · | 1.7 km | MPC · JPL |
| 882819 | 2016 EC_{68} | — | January 14, 2016 | Haleakala | Pan-STARRS 1 | BAR | 690 m | MPC · JPL |
| 882820 | 2016 EY_{68} | — | October 9, 2008 | Kitt Peak | Spacewatch | · | 1.9 km | MPC · JPL |
| 882821 | 2016 EB_{69} | — | February 12, 2016 | Haleakala | Pan-STARRS 1 | · | 1.9 km | MPC · JPL |
| 882822 | 2016 EO_{70} | — | February 9, 2016 | Haleakala | Pan-STARRS 1 | · | 2.6 km | MPC · JPL |
| 882823 | 2016 EQ_{72} | — | October 11, 2004 | Kitt Peak | Spacewatch | H | 350 m | MPC · JPL |
| 882824 | 2016 EN_{76} | — | February 13, 2011 | Mount Lemmon | Mount Lemmon Survey | · | 1.5 km | MPC · JPL |
| 882825 | 2016 EE_{82} | — | October 24, 2003 | Kitt Peak | Deep Ecliptic Survey | · | 2.0 km | MPC · JPL |
| 882826 | 2016 EA_{85} | — | March 10, 2016 | Haleakala | Pan-STARRS 1 | · | 640 m | MPC · JPL |
| 882827 | 2016 EP_{90} | — | March 3, 2016 | Mount Lemmon | Mount Lemmon Survey | · | 1.5 km | MPC · JPL |
| 882828 | 2016 EC_{97} | — | December 18, 2009 | Mount Lemmon | Mount Lemmon Survey | LIX | 2.1 km | MPC · JPL |
| 882829 | 2016 ED_{98} | — | February 3, 2016 | Haleakala | Pan-STARRS 1 | · | 2.8 km | MPC · JPL |
| 882830 | 2016 ES_{101} | — | March 7, 2016 | Haleakala | Pan-STARRS 1 | · | 2.3 km | MPC · JPL |
| 882831 | 2016 ET_{102} | — | March 7, 2016 | Haleakala | Pan-STARRS 1 | · | 2.3 km | MPC · JPL |
| 882832 | 2016 EA_{107} | — | November 27, 2014 | Haleakala | Pan-STARRS 1 | EOS | 1.3 km | MPC · JPL |
| 882833 | 2016 EP_{111} | — | October 20, 2014 | Mount Lemmon | Mount Lemmon Survey | · | 1.6 km | MPC · JPL |
| 882834 | 2016 EF_{117} | — | February 5, 2016 | Haleakala | Pan-STARRS 1 | · | 2.1 km | MPC · JPL |
| 882835 | 2016 EZ_{123} | — | February 10, 2016 | Haleakala | Pan-STARRS 1 | · | 1.8 km | MPC · JPL |
| 882836 | 2016 EF_{128} | — | November 22, 2014 | Haleakala | Pan-STARRS 1 | · | 1.3 km | MPC · JPL |
| 882837 | 2016 EJ_{129} | — | March 11, 2005 | Mount Lemmon | Mount Lemmon Survey | · | 2.1 km | MPC · JPL |
| 882838 | 2016 EL_{134} | — | March 13, 2005 | Kitt Peak | Spacewatch | · | 1.6 km | MPC · JPL |
| 882839 | 2016 EF_{140} | — | March 10, 2016 | Haleakala | Pan-STARRS 1 | · | 2.3 km | MPC · JPL |
| 882840 | 2016 EL_{153} | — | February 20, 2009 | Kitt Peak | Spacewatch | · | 390 m | MPC · JPL |
| 882841 | 2016 EE_{154} | — | January 16, 2016 | Haleakala | Pan-STARRS 1 | · | 1.5 km | MPC · JPL |
| 882842 | 2016 EX_{155} | — | March 12, 2016 | Haleakala | Pan-STARRS 1 | · | 320 m | MPC · JPL |
| 882843 | 2016 EV_{156} | — | September 1, 2014 | Catalina | CSS | H | 350 m | MPC · JPL |
| 882844 | 2016 ED_{157} | — | March 10, 2016 | Haleakala | Pan-STARRS 1 | AMO | 40 m | MPC · JPL |
| 882845 | 2016 EZ_{157} | — | March 12, 2016 | Haleakala | Pan-STARRS 1 | AMO · APO · PHA | 690 m | MPC · JPL |
| 882846 | 2016 EP_{158} | — | February 4, 2016 | Haleakala | Pan-STARRS 1 | · | 640 m | MPC · JPL |
| 882847 | 2016 EO_{159} | — | November 29, 2014 | Mount Lemmon | Mount Lemmon Survey | · | 1.6 km | MPC · JPL |
| 882848 | 2016 EW_{161} | — | April 28, 2011 | Haleakala | Pan-STARRS 1 | · | 1.1 km | MPC · JPL |
| 882849 | 2016 EU_{169} | — | October 30, 2014 | Mount Lemmon | Mount Lemmon Survey | · | 1.6 km | MPC · JPL |
| 882850 | 2016 EG_{172} | — | November 29, 2014 | Mount Lemmon | Mount Lemmon Survey | · | 1.6 km | MPC · JPL |
| 882851 | 2016 EU_{172} | — | January 12, 2016 | Haleakala | Pan-STARRS 1 | H | 360 m | MPC · JPL |
| 882852 | 2016 EE_{176} | — | January 15, 2015 | Haleakala | Pan-STARRS 1 | · | 2.1 km | MPC · JPL |
| 882853 | 2016 EK_{177} | — | March 12, 2016 | Haleakala | Pan-STARRS 1 | · | 2.0 km | MPC · JPL |
| 882854 | 2016 EX_{179} | — | January 16, 2015 | Haleakala | Pan-STARRS 1 | · | 1.6 km | MPC · JPL |
| 882855 | 2016 EX_{183} | — | March 12, 2016 | Haleakala | Pan-STARRS 1 | · | 2.1 km | MPC · JPL |
| 882856 | 2016 EW_{184} | — | February 10, 2016 | Haleakala | Pan-STARRS 1 | · | 780 m | MPC · JPL |
| 882857 | 2016 EH_{185} | — | March 11, 2016 | Mount Lemmon | Mount Lemmon Survey | · | 980 m | MPC · JPL |
| 882858 | 2016 EG_{192} | — | April 10, 2010 | WISE | WISE | LIX | 2.5 km | MPC · JPL |
| 882859 | 2016 EB_{194} | — | April 10, 2010 | WISE | WISE | · | 2.6 km | MPC · JPL |
| 882860 | 2016 EF_{198} | — | August 13, 2013 | Kitt Peak | Spacewatch | · | 2.4 km | MPC · JPL |
| 882861 | 2016 ET_{202} | — | September 11, 2001 | Kitt Peak | Spacewatch | · | 4.3 km | MPC · JPL |
| 882862 | 2016 ER_{203} | — | March 2, 2016 | Haleakala | Pan-STARRS 1 | H | 360 m | MPC · JPL |
| 882863 | 2016 EH_{204} | — | March 7, 2016 | Haleakala | Pan-STARRS 1 | H | 370 m | MPC · JPL |
| 882864 | 2016 EC_{206} | — | April 13, 2011 | Haleakala | Pan-STARRS 1 | H | 320 m | MPC · JPL |
| 882865 | 2016 EH_{206} | — | March 3, 2016 | Haleakala | Pan-STARRS 1 | H | 320 m | MPC · JPL |
| 882866 | 2016 EW_{206} | — | March 7, 2016 | Haleakala | Pan-STARRS 1 | H | 370 m | MPC · JPL |
| 882867 | 2016 EJ_{208} | — | March 4, 2016 | Haleakala | Pan-STARRS 1 | · | 1.1 km | MPC · JPL |
| 882868 | 2016 ES_{209} | — | January 17, 2015 | Haleakala | Pan-STARRS 1 | · | 2.5 km | MPC · JPL |
| 882869 | 2016 EQ_{210} | — | March 12, 2005 | Kitt Peak | Spacewatch | · | 1.9 km | MPC · JPL |
| 882870 | 2016 EW_{210} | — | March 10, 2016 | Haleakala | Pan-STARRS 1 | · | 2.2 km | MPC · JPL |
| 882871 | 2016 EN_{213} | — | March 12, 2016 | Haleakala | Pan-STARRS 1 | · | 1.6 km | MPC · JPL |
| 882872 | 2016 ED_{216} | — | March 10, 2016 | Haleakala | Pan-STARRS 1 | · | 730 m | MPC · JPL |
| 882873 | 2016 EG_{216} | — | September 7, 2008 | Mount Lemmon | Mount Lemmon Survey | TIR | 1.7 km | MPC · JPL |
| 882874 | 2016 EV_{220} | — | September 1, 2013 | Mount Lemmon | Mount Lemmon Survey | (895) | 2.4 km | MPC · JPL |
| 882875 | 2016 EH_{225} | — | March 12, 2016 | Haleakala | Pan-STARRS 1 | · | 2.0 km | MPC · JPL |
| 882876 | 2016 ER_{229} | — | November 27, 2014 | Haleakala | Pan-STARRS 1 | · | 1.8 km | MPC · JPL |
| 882877 | 2016 EN_{232} | — | March 1, 2012 | Mount Lemmon | Mount Lemmon Survey | NYS | 780 m | MPC · JPL |
| 882878 | 2016 EP_{237} | — | January 27, 2015 | Haleakala | Pan-STARRS 1 | · | 2.3 km | MPC · JPL |
| 882879 | 2016 EZ_{238} | — | October 3, 2013 | Haleakala | Pan-STARRS 1 | · | 2.3 km | MPC · JPL |
| 882880 | 2016 EX_{243} | — | March 10, 2016 | Haleakala | Pan-STARRS 1 | THM | 1.7 km | MPC · JPL |
| 882881 | 2016 EU_{246} | — | October 5, 2013 | Haleakala | Pan-STARRS 1 | · | 2.2 km | MPC · JPL |
| 882882 | 2016 EY_{247} | — | January 27, 2015 | Haleakala | Pan-STARRS 1 | · | 2.0 km | MPC · JPL |
| 882883 | 2016 EA_{248} | — | December 1, 2014 | Haleakala | Pan-STARRS 1 | · | 2.4 km | MPC · JPL |
| 882884 | 2016 EG_{250} | — | March 10, 2016 | Mount Lemmon | Mount Lemmon Survey | · | 2.7 km | MPC · JPL |
| 882885 | 2016 EE_{251} | — | March 4, 2016 | Haleakala | Pan-STARRS 1 | H | 410 m | MPC · JPL |
| 882886 | 2016 ED_{253} | — | March 12, 2016 | Haleakala | Pan-STARRS 1 | H | 270 m | MPC · JPL |
| 882887 | 2016 EA_{254} | — | March 6, 2016 | Haleakala | Pan-STARRS 1 | · | 880 m | MPC · JPL |
| 882888 | 2016 EG_{254} | — | March 18, 2009 | Kitt Peak | Spacewatch | · | 600 m | MPC · JPL |
| 882889 | 2016 EA_{255} | — | March 4, 2016 | Haleakala | Pan-STARRS 1 | · | 1.5 km | MPC · JPL |
| 882890 | 2016 EW_{256} | — | March 14, 2016 | Mount Lemmon | Mount Lemmon Survey | · | 2.3 km | MPC · JPL |
| 882891 | 2016 EG_{257} | — | March 10, 2016 | Haleakala | Pan-STARRS 1 | T_{j} (2.98) · EUP | 2.5 km | MPC · JPL |
| 882892 | 2016 EH_{257} | — | March 12, 2016 | Haleakala | Pan-STARRS 1 | · | 2.6 km | MPC · JPL |
| 882893 | 2016 EJ_{257} | — | March 4, 2016 | Haleakala | Pan-STARRS 1 | · | 2.1 km | MPC · JPL |
| 882894 | 2016 EK_{257} | — | July 10, 2018 | Haleakala | Pan-STARRS 1 | EOS | 1.5 km | MPC · JPL |
| 882895 | 2016 EO_{257} | — | March 10, 2016 | Mount Lemmon | Mount Lemmon Survey | · | 2.1 km | MPC · JPL |
| 882896 | 2016 ET_{257} | — | September 15, 1998 | Kitt Peak | Spacewatch | · | 1.5 km | MPC · JPL |
| 882897 | 2016 EV_{257} | — | March 6, 2016 | Haleakala | Pan-STARRS 1 | · | 2.4 km | MPC · JPL |
| 882898 | 2016 EC_{258} | — | March 1, 2016 | Haleakala | Pan-STARRS 1 | · | 2.0 km | MPC · JPL |
| 882899 | 2016 EG_{258} | — | March 10, 2016 | Haleakala | Pan-STARRS 1 | LUT | 2.9 km | MPC · JPL |
| 882900 | 2016 EK_{259} | — | March 4, 2016 | Haleakala | Pan-STARRS 1 | · | 1.8 km | MPC · JPL |

== 882901–883000 ==
back to top

| Designation | | | Discovery | | | Properties | | Ref |
| Permanent | Provisional | Named after | Date | Site | Discoverer(s) | Category | Diam. | Ref |
|---|---|---|---|---|---|---|---|---|
| 882901 | 2016 EA_{260} | — | March 3, 2016 | Haleakala | Pan-STARRS 1 | EOS | 1.3 km | MPC · JPL |
| 882902 | 2016 EE_{261} | — | March 13, 2016 | Haleakala | Pan-STARRS 1 | EOS | 1.6 km | MPC · JPL |
| 882903 | 2016 EY_{261} | — | March 3, 2016 | Mount Lemmon | Mount Lemmon Survey | · | 1.8 km | MPC · JPL |
| 882904 | 2016 EE_{262} | — | March 2, 2016 | Mount Lemmon | Mount Lemmon Survey | · | 910 m | MPC · JPL |
| 882905 | 2016 EM_{263} | — | December 29, 2014 | Haleakala | Pan-STARRS 1 | · | 1.3 km | MPC · JPL |
| 882906 | 2016 EZ_{266} | — | March 11, 2016 | Mount Lemmon | Mount Lemmon Survey | · | 970 m | MPC · JPL |
| 882907 | 2016 EB_{268} | — | March 5, 2016 | Haleakala | Pan-STARRS 1 | · | 2.0 km | MPC · JPL |
| 882908 | 2016 EQ_{268} | — | March 10, 2016 | Haleakala | Pan-STARRS 1 | HYG | 2.0 km | MPC · JPL |
| 882909 | 2016 EN_{269} | — | March 6, 2016 | Haleakala | Pan-STARRS 1 | · | 2.1 km | MPC · JPL |
| 882910 | 2016 EX_{271} | — | March 7, 2016 | Haleakala | Pan-STARRS 1 | · | 1.5 km | MPC · JPL |
| 882911 | 2016 EC_{273} | — | March 4, 2016 | Haleakala | Pan-STARRS 1 | · | 2.8 km | MPC · JPL |
| 882912 | 2016 ED_{283} | — | March 6, 2016 | Haleakala | Pan-STARRS 1 | · | 2.2 km | MPC · JPL |
| 882913 | 2016 EF_{283} | — | March 5, 2016 | Haleakala | Pan-STARRS 1 | · | 890 m | MPC · JPL |
| 882914 | 2016 EX_{284} | — | March 13, 2016 | Haleakala | Pan-STARRS 1 | THB | 1.4 km | MPC · JPL |
| 882915 | 2016 ED_{291} | — | March 12, 2016 | Haleakala | Pan-STARRS 1 | EOS | 1.3 km | MPC · JPL |
| 882916 | 2016 EE_{291} | — | March 12, 2016 | Haleakala | Pan-STARRS 1 | · | 2.2 km | MPC · JPL |
| 882917 | 2016 EJ_{292} | — | March 12, 2016 | Haleakala | Pan-STARRS 1 | · | 1.2 km | MPC · JPL |
| 882918 | 2016 EH_{293} | — | March 10, 2016 | Haleakala | Pan-STARRS 1 | · | 1.9 km | MPC · JPL |
| 882919 | 2016 EC_{294} | — | March 12, 2016 | Haleakala | Pan-STARRS 1 | · | 1.5 km | MPC · JPL |
| 882920 | 2016 EH_{295} | — | December 15, 2014 | Mount Lemmon | Mount Lemmon Survey | · | 1.5 km | MPC · JPL |
| 882921 | 2016 EM_{295} | — | March 14, 2016 | Mount Lemmon | Mount Lemmon Survey | · | 2.2 km | MPC · JPL |
| 882922 | 2016 EV_{296} | — | March 12, 2016 | Haleakala | Pan-STARRS 1 | · | 1.7 km | MPC · JPL |
| 882923 | 2016 ER_{298} | — | March 13, 2016 | Haleakala | Pan-STARRS 1 | URS | 2.4 km | MPC · JPL |
| 882924 | 2016 ED_{311} | — | March 11, 2016 | Haleakala | Pan-STARRS 1 | GEF | 820 m | MPC · JPL |
| 882925 | 2016 EX_{316} | — | March 12, 2016 | Haleakala | Pan-STARRS 1 | · | 1.5 km | MPC · JPL |
| 882926 | 2016 EJ_{317} | — | March 4, 2016 | Haleakala | Pan-STARRS 1 | · | 2.2 km | MPC · JPL |
| 882927 | 2016 EX_{320} | — | March 5, 2016 | Haleakala | Pan-STARRS 1 | · | 2.0 km | MPC · JPL |
| 882928 | 2016 EL_{324} | — | October 5, 2013 | Mount Lemmon | Mount Lemmon Survey | · | 1.8 km | MPC · JPL |
| 882929 | 2016 EU_{329} | — | March 13, 2016 | Haleakala | Pan-STARRS 1 | HOF | 1.7 km | MPC · JPL |
| 882930 | 2016 EE_{332} | — | March 12, 2016 | Haleakala | Pan-STARRS 1 | · | 1.9 km | MPC · JPL |
| 882931 | 2016 EM_{334} | — | March 14, 2016 | Mount Lemmon | Mount Lemmon Survey | · | 2.6 km | MPC · JPL |
| 882932 | 2016 EM_{337} | — | January 17, 2015 | Mount Lemmon | Mount Lemmon Survey | · | 2.9 km | MPC · JPL |
| 882933 | 2016 EZ_{345} | — | March 6, 2016 | Haleakala | Pan-STARRS 1 | · | 2.6 km | MPC · JPL |
| 882934 | 2016 EM_{357} | — | March 11, 2016 | Mount Lemmon | Mount Lemmon Survey | PAD | 900 m | MPC · JPL |
| 882935 | 2016 EM_{395} | — | March 1, 2016 | Haleakala | Pan-STARRS 1 | · | 2.6 km | MPC · JPL |
| 882936 | 2016 FH_{3} | — | March 27, 2011 | Mount Lemmon | Mount Lemmon Survey | H | 420 m | MPC · JPL |
| 882937 | 2016 FF_{7} | — | February 25, 2011 | Mount Lemmon | Mount Lemmon Survey | H | 520 m | MPC · JPL |
| 882938 | 2016 FF_{8} | — | October 4, 2008 | La Sagra | OAM | · | 3.4 km | MPC · JPL |
| 882939 | 2016 FP_{17} | — | March 10, 2016 | Haleakala | Pan-STARRS 1 | · | 2.0 km | MPC · JPL |
| 882940 | 2016 FV_{17} | — | August 10, 1994 | La Silla | E. W. Elst | PHO | 1.4 km | MPC · JPL |
| 882941 | 2016 FK_{20} | — | March 10, 2016 | Haleakala | Pan-STARRS 1 | critical | 1.1 km | MPC · JPL |
| 882942 | 2016 FQ_{21} | — | February 9, 2010 | Mount Lemmon | Mount Lemmon Survey | · | 1.8 km | MPC · JPL |
| 882943 | 2016 FS_{28} | — | April 6, 1999 | Kitt Peak | Spacewatch | · | 3.4 km | MPC · JPL |
| 882944 | 2016 FT_{32} | — | March 31, 2016 | Haleakala | Pan-STARRS 1 | · | 1.7 km | MPC · JPL |
| 882945 | 2016 FQ_{41} | — | March 10, 2016 | Haleakala | Pan-STARRS 1 | · | 770 m | MPC · JPL |
| 882946 | 2016 FT_{41} | — | February 20, 2010 | Catalina | CSS | T_{j} (2.99) | 2.8 km | MPC · JPL |
| 882947 | 2016 FH_{43} | — | February 14, 2010 | Mount Lemmon | Mount Lemmon Survey | · | 1.6 km | MPC · JPL |
| 882948 | 2016 FX_{52} | — | March 31, 2016 | Haleakala | Pan-STARRS 1 | · | 2.2 km | MPC · JPL |
| 882949 | 2016 FB_{62} | — | June 15, 2010 | WISE | WISE | · | 2.4 km | MPC · JPL |
| 882950 | 2016 FQ_{68} | — | March 30, 2016 | Haleakala | Pan-STARRS 1 | H | 310 m | MPC · JPL |
| 882951 | 2016 FY_{68} | — | March 31, 2016 | Haleakala | Pan-STARRS 1 | H | 370 m | MPC · JPL |
| 882952 | 2016 FH_{69} | — | March 31, 2016 | Haleakala | Pan-STARRS 1 | · | 1.2 km | MPC · JPL |
| 882953 | 2016 FL_{69} | — | March 13, 2005 | Mount Lemmon | Mount Lemmon Survey | · | 1.3 km | MPC · JPL |
| 882954 | 2016 FC_{70} | — | October 21, 2003 | Kitt Peak | Spacewatch | · | 1.7 km | MPC · JPL |
| 882955 | 2016 FD_{71} | — | March 16, 2016 | Haleakala | Pan-STARRS 1 | · | 2.5 km | MPC · JPL |
| 882956 | 2016 FX_{72} | — | March 18, 2016 | Haleakala | Pan-STARRS 1 | · | 1.0 km | MPC · JPL |
| 882957 | 2016 FJ_{77} | — | March 16, 2016 | Haleakala | Pan-STARRS 1 | · | 2.4 km | MPC · JPL |
| 882958 | 2016 FY_{79} | — | March 16, 2016 | Haleakala | Pan-STARRS 1 | · | 1.2 km | MPC · JPL |
| 882959 | 2016 FR_{85} | — | October 8, 2007 | Mount Lemmon | Mount Lemmon Survey | LUT | 2.5 km | MPC · JPL |
| 882960 | 2016 FC_{87} | — | March 28, 2016 | Cerro Tololo | DECam | · | 2.1 km | MPC · JPL |
| 882961 | 2016 FE_{87} | — | March 30, 2016 | Cerro Tololo | DECam | (69559) | 2.1 km | MPC · JPL |
| 882962 | 2016 FJ_{87} | — | March 28, 2016 | Cerro Tololo | DECam | · | 2.1 km | MPC · JPL |
| 882963 | 2016 FF_{88} | — | March 28, 2016 | Cerro Tololo | DECam | · | 2.3 km | MPC · JPL |
| 882964 | 2016 FK_{88} | — | March 28, 2016 | Cerro Tololo | DECam | EOS | 1.1 km | MPC · JPL |
| 882965 | 2016 FC_{90} | — | March 30, 2016 | Cerro Tololo | DECam | · | 1.1 km | MPC · JPL |
| 882966 | 2016 FY_{90} | — | March 28, 2016 | Cerro Tololo | DECam | · | 2.1 km | MPC · JPL |
| 882967 | 2016 FG_{94} | — | March 28, 2016 | Cerro Tololo | DECam | · | 1.6 km | MPC · JPL |
| 882968 | 2016 FL_{94} | — | March 28, 2016 | Cerro Tololo | DECam | · | 2.3 km | MPC · JPL |
| 882969 | 2016 FO_{106} | — | March 31, 2016 | Haleakala | Pan-STARRS 1 | · | 2.2 km | MPC · JPL |
| 882970 | 2016 FW_{111} | — | September 6, 2012 | Mount Lemmon | Mount Lemmon Survey | · | 2.1 km | MPC · JPL |
| 882971 | 2016 FW_{116} | — | January 14, 2015 | Cerro Paranal | Gaia Ground Based Optical Tracking | · | 1.9 km | MPC · JPL |
| 882972 | 2016 FA_{166} | — | March 28, 2016 | Cerro Tololo | DECam | · | 2.1 km | MPC · JPL |
| 882973 | 2016 FG_{166} | — | March 28, 2016 | Cerro Tololo | DECam | · | 2.0 km | MPC · JPL |
| 882974 | 2016 FS_{189} | — | March 29, 2016 | Cerro Tololo-DECam | DECam | · | 1.8 km | MPC · JPL |
| 882975 | 2016 FN_{203} | — | November 9, 2014 | Mount Lemmon | Mount Lemmon Survey | · | 900 m | MPC · JPL |
| 882976 | 2016 GO_{7} | — | March 14, 2005 | Mount Lemmon | Mount Lemmon Survey | · | 2.0 km | MPC · JPL |
| 882977 | 2016 GU_{8} | — | March 20, 1999 | Sacramento Peak | SDSS | · | 1.5 km | MPC · JPL |
| 882978 | 2016 GQ_{11} | — | September 20, 2009 | Catalina | CSS | · | 2.4 km | MPC · JPL |
| 882979 | 2016 GQ_{12} | — | April 1, 2016 | Mount Lemmon | Mount Lemmon Survey | · | 2.4 km | MPC · JPL |
| 882980 | 2016 GR_{14} | — | November 29, 2014 | Mount Lemmon | Mount Lemmon Survey | · | 1.6 km | MPC · JPL |
| 882981 | 2016 GC_{15} | — | March 13, 2016 | Haleakala | Pan-STARRS 1 | · | 720 m | MPC · JPL |
| 882982 | 2016 GK_{15} | — | January 18, 2016 | Haleakala | Pan-STARRS 1 | · | 740 m | MPC · JPL |
| 882983 | 2016 GQ_{15} | — | March 10, 2016 | Haleakala | Pan-STARRS 1 | · | 2.2 km | MPC · JPL |
| 882984 | 2016 GF_{18} | — | April 1, 2016 | Haleakala | Pan-STARRS 1 | MRX | 580 m | MPC · JPL |
| 882985 | 2016 GV_{20} | — | March 10, 2016 | Haleakala | Pan-STARRS 1 | (1118) | 2.0 km | MPC · JPL |
| 882986 | 2016 GB_{22} | — | November 19, 2014 | Haleakala | Pan-STARRS 1 | PHO | 780 m | MPC · JPL |
| 882987 | 2016 GK_{23} | — | March 10, 2016 | Haleakala | Pan-STARRS 1 | · | 510 m | MPC · JPL |
| 882988 | 2016 GU_{27} | — | February 9, 2005 | Mount Lemmon | Mount Lemmon Survey | · | 1.6 km | MPC · JPL |
| 882989 | 2016 GU_{28} | — | March 13, 2016 | Haleakala | Pan-STARRS 1 | · | 1.6 km | MPC · JPL |
| 882990 | 2016 GJ_{32} | — | April 1, 2016 | Haleakala | Pan-STARRS 1 | · | 1.2 km | MPC · JPL |
| 882991 | 2016 GO_{32} | — | September 23, 2008 | Kitt Peak | Spacewatch | · | 1.8 km | MPC · JPL |
| 882992 | 2016 GN_{33} | — | March 9, 2005 | Mount Lemmon | Mount Lemmon Survey | · | 2.2 km | MPC · JPL |
| 882993 | 2016 GT_{33} | — | March 28, 2016 | Mount Lemmon | Mount Lemmon Survey | · | 2.1 km | MPC · JPL |
| 882994 | 2016 GR_{57} | — | January 15, 2015 | Haleakala | Pan-STARRS 1 | · | 1.6 km | MPC · JPL |
| 882995 | 2016 GH_{66} | — | March 10, 2016 | Haleakala | Pan-STARRS 1 | · | 2.2 km | MPC · JPL |
| 882996 | 2016 GR_{69} | — | March 28, 2016 | Mount Lemmon | Mount Lemmon Survey | · | 2.1 km | MPC · JPL |
| 882997 | 2016 GY_{73} | — | March 31, 2016 | Mount Lemmon | Mount Lemmon Survey | HYG | 1.8 km | MPC · JPL |
| 882998 | 2016 GG_{85} | — | January 11, 2015 | Haleakala | Pan-STARRS 1 | · | 2.1 km | MPC · JPL |
| 882999 | 2016 GM_{91} | — | April 1, 2016 | Haleakala | Pan-STARRS 1 | critical | 990 m | MPC · JPL |
| 883000 | 2016 GK_{93} | — | January 20, 2015 | Mount Lemmon | Mount Lemmon Survey | · | 2.1 km | MPC · JPL |

back to top
