= List of minor planets: 818001–819000 =

The following is a partial list of minor planets, running from minor-planet number 818001 through 819000, inclusive. The primary data for this and other partial lists is based on JPL's "Small-Body Orbital Elements" and data available from the Minor Planet Center. Critical list information is also provided by the MPC, unless otherwise specified from Lowell Observatory. A detailed description of the table's columns and additional sources are given on the main page including a complete list of every page in this series, and a statistical break-up on the dynamical classification of minor planets.

Also see the summary list of all named bodies in numerical and alphabetical order, and the corresponding naming citations for the number range of this particular list. New namings may only be added to this list after official publication, as the preannouncement of names is condemned by the Working Group for Small Bodies Nomenclature of the International Astronomical Union.

Near-Earth obj.	MBA (inner)	MBA (outer)	Centaur
Mars-crosser	MBA (middle)	Jupiter trojan	Trans-Neptunian obj.
Unclassified

== 818001–818100 ==
Designation			Discovery			Properties		Ref
Permanent	Provisional	Named after	Date	Site	Discoverer(s)	Category	Diam.	Ref
818001	2013 AJ_{202}	—	January 9, 2013	Kitt Peak	Spacewatch	·	860 m	MPC · JPL
818002	2013 AV_{204}	—	January 2, 2013	Mount Lemmon	Mount Lemmon Survey	·	1.6 km	MPC · JPL
818003	2013 AZ_{204}	—	January 10, 2013	Haleakala	Pan-STARRS 1	·	1.6 km	MPC · JPL
818004	2013 AQ_{205}	—	January 10, 2013	Haleakala	Pan-STARRS 1	·	2.0 km	MPC · JPL
818005	2013 AZ_{205}	—	January 10, 2013	Haleakala	Pan-STARRS 1	·	1.8 km	MPC · JPL
818006	2013 AC_{210}	—	January 5, 2013	Kitt Peak	Spacewatch	·	1.8 km	MPC · JPL
818007	2013 AE_{210}	—	January 10, 2013	Haleakala	Pan-STARRS 1	·	880 m	MPC · JPL
818008	2013 AY_{211}	—	January 10, 2013	Haleakala	Pan-STARRS 1	·	2.1 km	MPC · JPL
818009	2013 BX_{1}	—	October 17, 2012	Haleakala	Pan-STARRS 1	·	3.0 km	MPC · JPL
818010	2013 BG_{8}	—	December 23, 2012	Haleakala	Pan-STARRS 1	·	930 m	MPC · JPL
818011	2013 BL_{16}	—	January 17, 2013	Mount Lemmon	Mount Lemmon Survey	H	370 m	MPC · JPL
818012	2013 BZ_{19}	—	January 16, 2013	Mount Lemmon	Mount Lemmon Survey	HNS	950 m	MPC · JPL
818013	2013 BQ_{24}	—	November 17, 2007	Kitt Peak	Spacewatch	·	1.8 km	MPC · JPL
818014	2013 BG_{25}	—	January 5, 2013	Kitt Peak	Spacewatch	·	1.7 km	MPC · JPL
818015	2013 BG_{27}	—	January 17, 2013	Haleakala	Pan-STARRS 1	AMO	330 m	MPC · JPL
818016	2013 BA_{32}	—	January 16, 2013	Haleakala	Pan-STARRS 1	·	580 m	MPC · JPL
818017	2013 BC_{45}	—	December 23, 2012	Haleakala	Pan-STARRS 1	·	350 m	MPC · JPL
818018	2013 BK_{45}	—	January 10, 2013	Haleakala	Pan-STARRS 1	H	400 m	MPC · JPL
818019	2013 BL_{46}	—	December 23, 2012	Haleakala	Pan-STARRS 1	·	2.3 km	MPC · JPL
818020	2013 BQ_{48}	—	December 23, 2012	Haleakala	Pan-STARRS 1	·	1.7 km	MPC · JPL
818021	2013 BW_{48}	—	March 27, 2008	Kitt Peak	Spacewatch	THM	1.5 km	MPC · JPL
818022	2013 BT_{49}	—	January 16, 2013	Haleakala	Pan-STARRS 1	·	510 m	MPC · JPL
818023	2013 BZ_{51}	—	January 16, 2013	Haleakala	Pan-STARRS 1	LIX	2.4 km	MPC · JPL
818024	2013 BL_{53}	—	January 16, 2013	Haleakala	Pan-STARRS 1	·	1.2 km	MPC · JPL
818025	2013 BE_{59}	—	January 17, 2013	Haleakala	Pan-STARRS 1	·	2.4 km	MPC · JPL
818026	2013 BK_{59}	—	January 22, 2006	Mount Lemmon	Mount Lemmon Survey	PHO	640 m	MPC · JPL
818027	2013 BQ_{59}	—	January 5, 2013	Kitt Peak	Spacewatch	·	840 m	MPC · JPL
818028	2013 BH_{88}	—	January 29, 2017	Mount Lemmon	Mount Lemmon Survey	·	1.1 km	MPC · JPL
818029	2013 BO_{88}	—	January 17, 2013	Haleakala	Pan-STARRS 1	EOS	1.2 km	MPC · JPL
818030	2013 BJ_{91}	—	January 19, 2013	Mount Lemmon	Mount Lemmon Survey	·	820 m	MPC · JPL
818031	2013 BF_{92}	—	January 18, 2013	Mount Lemmon	Mount Lemmon Survey	NYS	690 m	MPC · JPL
818032	2013 BO_{94}	—	September 21, 2011	Catalina	CSS	·	1.5 km	MPC · JPL
818033	2013 BV_{94}	—	January 18, 2013	Mount Lemmon	Mount Lemmon Survey	·	1.2 km	MPC · JPL
818034	2013 BY_{94}	—	January 22, 2013	Kitt Peak	Spacewatch	TIR	1.8 km	MPC · JPL
818035	2013 BS_{95}	—	January 22, 2013	Mount Lemmon	Mount Lemmon Survey	·	1.1 km	MPC · JPL
818036	2013 BZ_{100}	—	January 17, 2013	Haleakala	Pan-STARRS 1	·	2.1 km	MPC · JPL
818037	2013 BQ_{101}	—	January 17, 2013	Haleakala	Pan-STARRS 1	·	1.5 km	MPC · JPL
818038	2013 BW_{101}	—	January 19, 2013	Mount Lemmon	Mount Lemmon Survey	·	1.7 km	MPC · JPL
818039	2013 BQ_{106}	—	January 16, 2013	Haleakala	Pan-STARRS 1	·	1.2 km	MPC · JPL
818040	2013 BR_{109}	—	January 19, 2013	Kitt Peak	Spacewatch	·	1.5 km	MPC · JPL
818041	2013 CL	—	January 10, 2013	Kitt Peak	Spacewatch	·	630 m	MPC · JPL
818042	2013 CO_{12}	—	April 1, 2009	Kitt Peak	Spacewatch	AEO	990 m	MPC · JPL
818043	2013 CR_{16}	—	February 1, 2013	Kitt Peak	Spacewatch	NYS	1.0 km	MPC · JPL
818044	2013 CQ_{19}	—	December 23, 2012	Haleakala	Pan-STARRS 1	·	970 m	MPC · JPL
818045	2013 CU_{20}	—	December 4, 2008	Kitt Peak	Spacewatch	NYS	690 m	MPC · JPL
818046	2013 CX_{27}	—	January 9, 2013	Kitt Peak	Spacewatch	MAS	540 m	MPC · JPL
818047	2013 CZ_{27}	—	January 23, 2006	Mount Lemmon	Mount Lemmon Survey	·	300 m	MPC · JPL
818048	2013 CV_{51}	—	February 7, 2013	Oukaïmeden	C. Rinner	·	570 m	MPC · JPL
818049	2013 CU_{75}	—	August 24, 2001	Kitt Peak	Spacewatch	H	350 m	MPC · JPL
818050	2013 CH_{82}	—	February 8, 2013	Haleakala	Pan-STARRS 1	H	380 m	MPC · JPL
818051	2013 CY_{85}	—	February 7, 2013	Kitt Peak	Spacewatch	JUN	850 m	MPC · JPL
818052	2013 CR_{88}	—	February 12, 2013	Haleakala	Pan-STARRS 1	H	390 m	MPC · JPL
818053	2013 CH_{90}	—	February 7, 2013	Kitt Peak	Spacewatch	·	1.6 km	MPC · JPL
818054	2013 CW_{91}	—	February 8, 2013	Haleakala	Pan-STARRS 1	AGN	990 m	MPC · JPL
818055	2013 CT_{97}	—	February 8, 2013	Haleakala	Pan-STARRS 1	MAS	570 m	MPC · JPL
818056	2013 CR_{108}	—	February 9, 2013	Haleakala	Pan-STARRS 1	·	980 m	MPC · JPL
818057	2013 CD_{109}	—	January 20, 2013	Kitt Peak	Spacewatch	·	860 m	MPC · JPL
818058	2013 CN_{115}	—	January 17, 2013	Haleakala	Pan-STARRS 1	·	2.2 km	MPC · JPL
818059	2013 CM_{136}	—	February 7, 2013	Nogales	M. Schwartz, P. R. Holvorcem	·	1.6 km	MPC · JPL
818060	2013 CT_{150}	—	February 14, 2013	Kitt Peak	Spacewatch	·	550 m	MPC · JPL
818061	2013 CS_{152}	—	February 14, 2013	Haleakala	Pan-STARRS 1	·	1.6 km	MPC · JPL
818062	2013 CX_{158}	—	February 14, 2013	Kitt Peak	Spacewatch	·	900 m	MPC · JPL
818063	2013 CR_{163}	—	February 14, 2013	Kitt Peak	Spacewatch	·	410 m	MPC · JPL
818064	2013 CZ_{166}	—	November 25, 2005	Kitt Peak	Spacewatch	·	450 m	MPC · JPL
818065	2013 CZ_{167}	—	February 14, 2013	Haleakala	Pan-STARRS 1	·	2.2 km	MPC · JPL
818066	2013 CD_{175}	—	March 4, 2006	Kitt Peak	Spacewatch	·	700 m	MPC · JPL
818067	2013 CQ_{187}	—	November 30, 2008	Kitt Peak	Spacewatch	·	960 m	MPC · JPL
818068	2013 CV_{201}	—	February 9, 2013	Haleakala	Pan-STARRS 1	THM	1.6 km	MPC · JPL
818069	2013 CH_{206}	—	February 10, 2013	Haleakala	Pan-STARRS 1	·	1.9 km	MPC · JPL
818070	2013 CA_{208}	—	February 14, 2013	Kitt Peak	Spacewatch	MAS	540 m	MPC · JPL
818071	2013 CU_{209}	—	December 26, 2005	Mount Lemmon	Mount Lemmon Survey	·	480 m	MPC · JPL
818072	2013 CF_{215}	—	January 10, 2006	Kitt Peak	Spacewatch	·	460 m	MPC · JPL
818073	2013 CP_{216}	—	December 23, 2012	Haleakala	Pan-STARRS 1	·	490 m	MPC · JPL
818074	2013 CM_{219}	—	January 19, 2013	Kitt Peak	Spacewatch	·	1.8 km	MPC · JPL
818075	2013 CK_{227}	—	February 14, 2013	Kitt Peak	Spacewatch	·	1.4 km	MPC · JPL
818076	2013 CX_{229}	—	May 21, 2014	Haleakala	Pan-STARRS 1	·	1.0 km	MPC · JPL
818077	2013 CG_{230}	—	February 3, 2013	Haleakala	Pan-STARRS 1	·	1.5 km	MPC · JPL
818078	2013 CW_{231}	—	February 9, 2013	Haleakala	Pan-STARRS 1	·	1.0 km	MPC · JPL
818079	2013 CG_{232}	—	February 15, 2013	Haleakala	Pan-STARRS 1	·	1.2 km	MPC · JPL
818080	2013 CW_{233}	—	May 7, 2014	Haleakala	Pan-STARRS 1	V	410 m	MPC · JPL
818081	2013 CQ_{234}	—	February 14, 2013	Haleakala	Pan-STARRS 1	·	2.1 km	MPC · JPL
818082	2013 CT_{234}	—	February 8, 2013	Haleakala	Pan-STARRS 1	·	2.4 km	MPC · JPL
818083	2013 CE_{235}	—	February 15, 2013	Haleakala	Pan-STARRS 1	·	1.8 km	MPC · JPL
818084	2013 CY_{236}	—	January 12, 2018	Haleakala	Pan-STARRS 1	·	1.8 km	MPC · JPL
818085	2013 CS_{238}	—	February 15, 2013	Haleakala	Pan-STARRS 1	·	2.1 km	MPC · JPL
818086	2013 CA_{243}	—	February 9, 2013	Haleakala	Pan-STARRS 1	·	1.6 km	MPC · JPL
818087	2013 CL_{243}	—	February 5, 2013	Mount Lemmon	Mount Lemmon Survey	·	660 m	MPC · JPL
818088	2013 CT_{246}	—	February 6, 2013	Kitt Peak	Spacewatch	·	1.0 km	MPC · JPL
818089	2013 CE_{255}	—	February 9, 2013	Haleakala	Pan-STARRS 1	·	1.9 km	MPC · JPL
818090	2013 CN_{257}	—	February 14, 2013	Haleakala	Pan-STARRS 1	·	2.0 km	MPC · JPL
818091	2013 CP_{259}	—	February 9, 2013	Haleakala	Pan-STARRS 1	EOS	1.3 km	MPC · JPL
818092	2013 CQ_{259}	—	February 14, 2013	Haleakala	Pan-STARRS 1	·	460 m	MPC · JPL
818093	2013 CV_{261}	—	February 9, 2013	Haleakala	Pan-STARRS 1	·	1.7 km	MPC · JPL
818094	2013 CA_{269}	—	February 2, 2013	Mount Lemmon	Mount Lemmon Survey	·	2.0 km	MPC · JPL
818095	2013 DM	—	February 17, 2013	Mount Lemmon	Mount Lemmon Survey	EUN	860 m	MPC · JPL
818096	2013 DW_{5}	—	February 16, 2013	Mount Lemmon	Mount Lemmon Survey	·	450 m	MPC · JPL
818097	2013 DP_{6}	—	February 16, 2013	Mount Lemmon	Mount Lemmon Survey	THM	1.8 km	MPC · JPL
818098	2013 DR_{12}	—	February 16, 2013	Mount Lemmon	Mount Lemmon Survey	·	520 m	MPC · JPL
818099	2013 DC_{14}	—	February 17, 2013	Mount Lemmon	Mount Lemmon Survey	·	1.7 km	MPC · JPL
818100	2013 DE_{21}	—	February 16, 2013	Mount Lemmon	Mount Lemmon Survey	·	2.2 km	MPC · JPL

== 818101–818200 ==
back to top

Designation			Discovery			Properties		Ref
Permanent	Provisional	Named after	Date	Site	Discoverer(s)	Category	Diam.	Ref
818101	2013 DP_{22}	—	February 16, 2013	Mount Lemmon	Mount Lemmon Survey	·	1.4 km	MPC · JPL
818102	2013 EG_{4}	—	March 3, 2013	Mount Lemmon	Mount Lemmon Survey	·	1.9 km	MPC · JPL
818103	2013 EZ_{8}	—	January 17, 2009	Mount Lemmon	Mount Lemmon Survey	NYS	930 m	MPC · JPL
818104	2013 EQ_{12}	—	February 5, 2013	Kitt Peak	Spacewatch	(5)	880 m	MPC · JPL
818105	2013 EJ_{15}	—	February 5, 2013	Kitt Peak	Spacewatch	·	810 m	MPC · JPL
818106	2013 EX_{17}	—	February 15, 2013	Haleakala	Pan-STARRS 1	PHO	730 m	MPC · JPL
818107	2013 EH_{34}	—	March 5, 2013	San Pedro de Atacama	I. de la Cueva	·	1.9 km	MPC · JPL
818108	2013 EK_{34}	—	February 27, 2006	Kitt Peak	Spacewatch	NYS	680 m	MPC · JPL
818109	2013 EH_{39}	—	February 27, 2006	Kitt Peak	Spacewatch	·	700 m	MPC · JPL
818110	2013 EK_{64}	—	March 8, 2013	Haleakala	Pan-STARRS 1	·	490 m	MPC · JPL
818111	2013 EX_{64}	—	February 14, 2013	Kitt Peak	Spacewatch	·	420 m	MPC · JPL
818112	2013 EV_{80}	—	October 5, 2005	Mount Lemmon	Mount Lemmon Survey	·	1.8 km	MPC · JPL
818113	2013 EQ_{82}	—	March 8, 2013	Haleakala	Pan-STARRS 1	·	2.0 km	MPC · JPL
818114	2013 EQ_{95}	—	March 8, 2013	Haleakala	Pan-STARRS 1	TIR	1.7 km	MPC · JPL
818115	2013 ES_{96}	—	September 5, 2010	Mount Lemmon	Mount Lemmon Survey	·	970 m	MPC · JPL
818116	2013 EO_{103}	—	February 20, 2009	Kitt Peak	Spacewatch	·	1.0 km	MPC · JPL
818117	2013 EO_{104}	—	March 12, 2013	Mount Lemmon	Mount Lemmon Survey	·	560 m	MPC · JPL
818118	2013 EV_{104}	—	March 12, 2013	Mount Lemmon	Mount Lemmon Survey	·	1.6 km	MPC · JPL
818119	2013 EE_{128}	—	February 26, 2007	Catalina	CSS	T_{j} (2.91)	2.4 km	MPC · JPL
818120	2013 EW_{129}	—	March 12, 2013	Kitt Peak	Research and Education Collaborative Occultation Network	MAS	520 m	MPC · JPL
818121	2013 EY_{134}	—	March 12, 2013	Kitt Peak	Research and Education Collaborative Occultation Network	·	520 m	MPC · JPL
818122	2013 EP_{137}	—	January 31, 2013	Mount Lemmon	Mount Lemmon Survey	·	1.8 km	MPC · JPL
818123	2013 EA_{139}	—	March 13, 2013	Kitt Peak	Research and Education Collaborative Occultation Network	NYS	800 m	MPC · JPL
818124	2013 EX_{143}	—	September 4, 2011	Haleakala	Pan-STARRS 1	·	820 m	MPC · JPL
818125	2013 EW_{154}	—	September 8, 2011	Haleakala	Pan-STARRS 1	H	410 m	MPC · JPL
818126	2013 EZ_{160}	—	March 5, 2013	Haleakala	Pan-STARRS 1	PHO	750 m	MPC · JPL
818127	2013 EO_{161}	—	March 6, 2013	Elena Remote	Oreshko, A.	·	810 m	MPC · JPL
818128	2013 EF_{163}	—	September 9, 2015	Haleakala	Pan-STARRS 1	·	1.1 km	MPC · JPL
818129	2013 EA_{174}	—	March 4, 2013	Haleakala	Pan-STARRS 1	·	1.8 km	MPC · JPL
818130	2013 ED_{174}	—	March 13, 2013	Mount Lemmon	Mount Lemmon Survey	·	1.0 km	MPC · JPL
818131	2013 EU_{175}	—	March 5, 2013	Haleakala	Pan-STARRS 1	·	840 m	MPC · JPL
818132	2013 EL_{176}	—	March 3, 2013	Haleakala	Pan-STARRS 1	L4	6.1 km	MPC · JPL
818133	2013 EO_{177}	—	March 4, 2013	Haleakala	Pan-STARRS 1	·	2.6 km	MPC · JPL
818134	2013 EG_{185}	—	March 5, 2013	Mount Lemmon	Mount Lemmon Survey	·	2.0 km	MPC · JPL
818135	2013 EL_{190}	—	March 7, 2013	Mount Lemmon	Mount Lemmon Survey	·	2.1 km	MPC · JPL
818136	2013 FT	—	December 3, 2007	Kitt Peak	Spacewatch	·	1.6 km	MPC · JPL
818137	2013 FL_{2}	—	March 8, 2013	Haleakala	Pan-STARRS 1	·	1.2 km	MPC · JPL
818138	2013 FL_{15}	—	March 17, 2013	Mount Lemmon	Mount Lemmon Survey	·	1.9 km	MPC · JPL
818139	2013 FC_{16}	—	March 5, 2013	Mount Lemmon	Mount Lemmon Survey	·	1.3 km	MPC · JPL
818140	2013 FE_{30}	—	March 19, 2013	Haleakala	Pan-STARRS 1	·	1.0 km	MPC · JPL
818141	2013 FU_{32}	—	March 19, 2013	Haleakala	Pan-STARRS 1	·	2.1 km	MPC · JPL
818142	2013 FD_{35}	—	March 19, 2013	Haleakala	Pan-STARRS 1	·	520 m	MPC · JPL
818143	2013 FZ_{37}	—	March 19, 2013	Haleakala	Pan-STARRS 1	THM	1.8 km	MPC · JPL
818144	2013 FM_{41}	—	March 18, 2013	Mount Lemmon	Mount Lemmon Survey	T_{j} (2.99)	2.2 km	MPC · JPL
818145	2013 GB_{1}	—	March 19, 2013	Haleakala	Pan-STARRS 1	·	2.2 km	MPC · JPL
818146	2013 GD_{2}	—	November 18, 2011	Mount Lemmon	Mount Lemmon Survey	·	930 m	MPC · JPL
818147	2013 GD_{8}	—	April 5, 2013	Haleakala	Pan-STARRS 1	H	390 m	MPC · JPL
818148	2013 GF_{8}	—	March 7, 2013	Catalina	CSS	T_{j} (2.95)	2.2 km	MPC · JPL
818149	2013 GG_{11}	—	March 15, 2013	Mount Lemmon	Mount Lemmon Survey	·	1.2 km	MPC · JPL
818150	2013 GQ_{28}	—	March 23, 2006	Mount Lemmon	Mount Lemmon Survey	·	500 m	MPC · JPL
818151	2013 GF_{30}	—	March 16, 2013	Mount Lemmon	Mount Lemmon Survey	·	1.4 km	MPC · JPL
818152	2013 GU_{34}	—	April 7, 2013	Mount Lemmon	Mount Lemmon Survey	·	560 m	MPC · JPL
818153	2013 GZ_{34}	—	April 6, 2013	Haleakala	Pan-STARRS 1	·	350 m	MPC · JPL
818154	2013 GB_{35}	—	April 7, 2013	Mount Lemmon	Mount Lemmon Survey	H	320 m	MPC · JPL
818155	2013 GS_{38}	—	April 6, 2013	Haleakala	Pan-STARRS 1	APO	360 m	MPC · JPL
818156	2013 GN_{40}	—	January 26, 2006	Mount Lemmon	Mount Lemmon Survey	·	580 m	MPC · JPL
818157	2013 GU_{59}	—	October 27, 2008	Kitt Peak	Spacewatch	·	480 m	MPC · JPL
818158	2013 GE_{60}	—	March 23, 1995	Kitt Peak	Spacewatch	·	800 m	MPC · JPL
818159	2013 GL_{65}	—	February 26, 2007	Catalina	CSS	T_{j} (2.95)	2.4 km	MPC · JPL
818160	2013 GU_{71}	—	April 2, 2013	Mount Lemmon	Mount Lemmon Survey	·	830 m	MPC · JPL
818161	2013 GC_{73}	—	March 19, 2013	Haleakala	Pan-STARRS 1	·	1.4 km	MPC · JPL
818162	2013 GV_{74}	—	April 10, 2013	Palomar	Palomar Transient Factory	·	2.2 km	MPC · JPL
818163	2013 GO_{75}	—	March 24, 2006	Kitt Peak	Spacewatch	·	550 m	MPC · JPL
818164	2013 GJ_{80}	—	April 13, 2013	Haleakala	Pan-STARRS 1	·	1.2 km	MPC · JPL
818165	2013 GU_{80}	—	April 10, 2013	Elena Remote	Oreshko, A.	·	540 m	MPC · JPL
818166	2013 GZ_{85}	—	April 14, 2013	Palomar	Palomar Transient Factory	·	2.0 km	MPC · JPL
818167	2013 GU_{100}	—	April 13, 2013	Haleakala	Pan-STARRS 1	·	1.8 km	MPC · JPL
818168	2013 GH_{103}	—	February 19, 2009	Mount Lemmon	Mount Lemmon Survey	PHO	740 m	MPC · JPL
818169	2013 GP_{104}	—	February 12, 2000	Sacramento Peak	SDSS	·	520 m	MPC · JPL
818170	2013 GY_{112}	—	February 27, 2009	Kitt Peak	Spacewatch	·	990 m	MPC · JPL
818171	2013 GJ_{115}	—	April 3, 2013	Mount Lemmon	Mount Lemmon Survey	·	2.1 km	MPC · JPL
818172	2013 GN_{123}	—	April 11, 2013	Mount Lemmon	Mount Lemmon Survey	·	1.4 km	MPC · JPL
818173	2013 GG_{127}	—	April 13, 2013	Haleakala	Pan-STARRS 1	·	690 m	MPC · JPL
818174	2013 GB_{129}	—	January 13, 2013	Mount Lemmon	Mount Lemmon Survey	H	430 m	MPC · JPL
818175	2013 GX_{134}	—	March 16, 2013	Mount Lemmon	Mount Lemmon Survey	BRG	1.1 km	MPC · JPL
818176	2013 GQ_{135}	—	March 2, 2006	Kitt Peak	L. H. Wasserman, R. L. Millis	(2076)	490 m	MPC · JPL
818177	2013 GR_{140}	—	April 12, 2013	Haleakala	Pan-STARRS 1	·	2.2 km	MPC · JPL
818178	2013 GX_{142}	—	April 13, 2013	Kitt Peak	Spacewatch	·	810 m	MPC · JPL
818179	2013 GY_{142}	—	April 13, 2013	Haleakala	Pan-STARRS 1	·	920 m	MPC · JPL
818180	2013 GH_{147}	—	June 4, 2014	Haleakala	Pan-STARRS 1	·	1.1 km	MPC · JPL
818181	2013 GN_{147}	—	April 12, 2013	Siding Spring	SSS	·	1.6 km	MPC · JPL
818182	2013 GV_{148}	—	April 15, 2013	Haleakala	Pan-STARRS 1	THB	2.5 km	MPC · JPL
818183	2013 GN_{149}	—	November 1, 2015	Mount Lemmon	Mount Lemmon Survey	·	1.6 km	MPC · JPL
818184	2013 GS_{149}	—	September 12, 2015	Haleakala	Pan-STARRS 1	HYG	1.9 km	MPC · JPL
818185	2013 GX_{149}	—	July 1, 2014	Haleakala	Pan-STARRS 1	·	1.8 km	MPC · JPL
818186	2013 GR_{150}	—	August 27, 2014	Haleakala	Pan-STARRS 1	·	850 m	MPC · JPL
818187	2013 GS_{150}	—	November 5, 2016	Haleakala	Pan-STARRS 1	·	2.2 km	MPC · JPL
818188	2013 GN_{152}	—	April 8, 2013	Haleakala	Pan-STARRS 1	·	730 m	MPC · JPL
818189	2013 GM_{161}	—	April 13, 2013	Haleakala	Pan-STARRS 1	·	2.4 km	MPC · JPL
818190	2013 GL_{162}	—	April 12, 2013	Haleakala	Pan-STARRS 1	·	2.1 km	MPC · JPL
818191	2013 GT_{163}	—	June 19, 2010	Mount Lemmon	Mount Lemmon Survey	·	510 m	MPC · JPL
818192	2013 GL_{169}	—	April 10, 2013	Kitt Peak	Spacewatch	·	2.2 km	MPC · JPL
818193	2013 HY_{1}	—	April 17, 2013	Haleakala	Pan-STARRS 1	·	550 m	MPC · JPL
818194	2013 HC_{3}	—	January 15, 2009	Kitt Peak	Spacewatch	·	750 m	MPC · JPL
818195	2013 HB_{7}	—	April 19, 2013	Haleakala	Pan-STARRS 1	·	1.6 km	MPC · JPL
818196	2013 HX_{11}	—	April 3, 2008	Mount Lemmon	Mount Lemmon Survey	H	350 m	MPC · JPL
818197	2013 HN_{13}	—	April 20, 2013	Mount Lemmon	Mount Lemmon Survey	·	1.5 km	MPC · JPL
818198	2013 HN_{17}	—	February 10, 2002	Socorro	LINEAR	·	740 m	MPC · JPL
818199	2013 HS_{29}	—	April 16, 2013	Cerro Tololo-DECam	DECam	URS	1.8 km	MPC · JPL
818200	2013 HZ_{29}	—	April 9, 2013	Haleakala	Pan-STARRS 1	·	790 m	MPC · JPL

== 818201–818300 ==
back to top

Designation			Discovery			Properties		Ref
Permanent	Provisional	Named after	Date	Site	Discoverer(s)	Category	Diam.	Ref
818201	2013 HA_{31}	—	April 16, 2013	Cerro Tololo-DECam	DECam	LIX	2.3 km	MPC · JPL
818202	2013 HX_{34}	—	April 16, 2013	Cerro Tololo-DECam	DECam	·	530 m	MPC · JPL
818203	2013 HH_{36}	—	April 16, 2013	Cerro Tololo-DECam	DECam	·	530 m	MPC · JPL
818204	2013 HQ_{40}	—	April 16, 2013	Cerro Tololo-DECam	DECam	·	390 m	MPC · JPL
818205	2013 HW_{41}	—	July 29, 2005	Palomar	NEAT	·	840 m	MPC · JPL
818206	2013 HB_{42}	—	April 16, 2013	Cerro Tololo-DECam	DECam	BRG	830 m	MPC · JPL
818207	2013 HN_{48}	—	April 16, 2013	Cerro Tololo-DECam	DECam	·	1.4 km	MPC · JPL
818208	2013 HM_{53}	—	February 3, 2009	Mount Lemmon	Mount Lemmon Survey	·	830 m	MPC · JPL
818209	2013 HY_{56}	—	April 16, 2013	Cerro Tololo-DECam	DECam	ELF	1.8 km	MPC · JPL
818210	2013 HC_{57}	—	April 16, 2013	Cerro Tololo-DECam	DECam	·	1.9 km	MPC · JPL
818211	2013 HV_{66}	—	September 14, 2005	Kitt Peak	Spacewatch	AGN	770 m	MPC · JPL
818212	2013 HQ_{67}	—	September 29, 2011	Mount Lemmon	Mount Lemmon Survey	·	530 m	MPC · JPL
818213	2013 HQ_{69}	—	April 9, 2013	Haleakala	Pan-STARRS 1	·	370 m	MPC · JPL
818214	2013 HB_{76}	—	April 9, 2013	Haleakala	Pan-STARRS 1	·	1.8 km	MPC · JPL
818215	2013 HF_{88}	—	April 2, 2013	Mount Lemmon	Mount Lemmon Survey	NYS	600 m	MPC · JPL
818216	2013 HX_{89}	—	March 15, 2013	Kitt Peak	Spacewatch	·	620 m	MPC · JPL
818217	2013 HS_{90}	—	November 3, 2007	Kitt Peak	Spacewatch	·	720 m	MPC · JPL
818218	2013 HE_{117}	—	April 14, 2013	ESA OGS	ESA OGS	·	1.9 km	MPC · JPL
818219	2013 HG_{125}	—	April 17, 2013	Cerro Tololo-DECam	DECam	·	460 m	MPC · JPL
818220	2013 HK_{126}	—	April 9, 2013	Haleakala	Pan-STARRS 1	·	1.7 km	MPC · JPL
818221	2013 HG_{127}	—	April 9, 2013	Haleakala	Pan-STARRS 1	·	1.3 km	MPC · JPL
818222	2013 HR_{128}	—	August 15, 2009	Kitt Peak	Spacewatch	·	1.8 km	MPC · JPL
818223	2013 HH_{129}	—	April 17, 2013	Cerro Tololo-DECam	DECam	·	540 m	MPC · JPL
818224	2013 HK_{133}	—	April 17, 2013	Cerro Tololo-DECam	DECam	AGN	810 m	MPC · JPL
818225	2013 HS_{136}	—	April 17, 2013	Cerro Tololo-DECam	DECam	LIX	2.2 km	MPC · JPL
818226	2013 HZ_{140}	—	October 18, 2003	Kitt Peak	Spacewatch	MAS	510 m	MPC · JPL
818227	2013 HD_{142}	—	April 10, 2013	Haleakala	Pan-STARRS 1	THM	1.9 km	MPC · JPL
818228	2013 HK_{143}	—	April 10, 2013	Haleakala	Pan-STARRS 1	·	620 m	MPC · JPL
818229	2013 HM_{144}	—	April 9, 2013	Haleakala	Pan-STARRS 1	·	1.5 km	MPC · JPL
818230	2013 HJ_{158}	—	April 16, 2013	Haleakala	Pan-STARRS 1	H	370 m	MPC · JPL
818231	2013 HJ_{160}	—	July 30, 2014	Haleakala	Pan-STARRS 1	·	2.3 km	MPC · JPL
818232	2013 HO_{162}	—	April 17, 2013	Haleakala	Pan-STARRS 1	TIR	2.0 km	MPC · JPL
818233	2013 HW_{162}	—	April 16, 2013	Haleakala	Pan-STARRS 1	·	2.3 km	MPC · JPL
818234	2013 HX_{162}	—	April 19, 2013	Haleakala	Pan-STARRS 1	·	2.2 km	MPC · JPL
818235	2013 HZ_{162}	—	April 16, 2013	Haleakala	Pan-STARRS 1	·	610 m	MPC · JPL
818236	2013 HW_{163}	—	April 17, 2013	Haleakala	Pan-STARRS 1	·	770 m	MPC · JPL
818237	2013 HX_{163}	—	April 17, 2013	Haleakala	Pan-STARRS 1	·	680 m	MPC · JPL
818238	2013 JP_{6}	—	April 12, 2013	Haleakala	Pan-STARRS 1	·	860 m	MPC · JPL
818239	2013 JJ_{10}	—	April 11, 2013	Mount Lemmon	Mount Lemmon Survey	·	1.1 km	MPC · JPL
818240	2013 JV_{11}	—	April 13, 2013	Kitt Peak	Spacewatch	·	570 m	MPC · JPL
818241	2013 JN_{15}	—	April 20, 2013	Mount Lemmon	Mount Lemmon Survey	·	1.6 km	MPC · JPL
818242	2013 JF_{17}	—	November 19, 2001	Socorro	LINEAR	H	380 m	MPC · JPL
818243	2013 JB_{21}	—	April 19, 2013	Haleakala	Pan-STARRS 1	·	1.9 km	MPC · JPL
818244	2013 JD_{24}	—	May 8, 2013	Haleakala	Pan-STARRS 1	·	1.2 km	MPC · JPL
818245	2013 JT_{25}	—	April 15, 2013	Haleakala	Pan-STARRS 1	·	740 m	MPC · JPL
818246	2013 JS_{28}	—	May 12, 2013	Mount Lemmon	Mount Lemmon Survey	H	440 m	MPC · JPL
818247	2013 JE_{30}	—	March 15, 2013	Palomar	Palomar Transient Factory	EUP	2.6 km	MPC · JPL
818248	2013 JX_{32}	—	May 12, 2013	Mount Lemmon	Mount Lemmon Survey	·	2.4 km	MPC · JPL
818249	2013 JV_{34}	—	November 20, 2009	Kitt Peak	Spacewatch	H	310 m	MPC · JPL
818250	2013 JT_{38}	—	May 10, 2013	Siding Spring	SSS	·	530 m	MPC · JPL
818251	2013 JX_{47}	—	April 19, 2013	Haleakala	Pan-STARRS 1	·	840 m	MPC · JPL
818252	2013 JJ_{51}	—	April 15, 2013	Haleakala	Pan-STARRS 1	THM	1.9 km	MPC · JPL
818253	2013 JW_{52}	—	April 10, 2013	Haleakala	Pan-STARRS 1	·	1.4 km	MPC · JPL
818254	2013 JE_{53}	—	May 1, 2013	Mount Lemmon	Mount Lemmon Survey	TIR	2.3 km	MPC · JPL
818255	2013 JN_{68}	—	May 8, 2013	Haleakala	Pan-STARRS 1	·	740 m	MPC · JPL
818256	2013 JO_{68}	—	May 7, 2013	Mount Lemmon	Mount Lemmon Survey	·	2.3 km	MPC · JPL
818257	2013 JP_{68}	—	July 27, 2001	Anderson Mesa	LONEOS	·	840 m	MPC · JPL
818258	2013 JY_{69}	—	May 8, 2013	Haleakala	Pan-STARRS 1	T_{j} (2.98)	3.0 km	MPC · JPL
818259	2013 JZ_{69}	—	March 3, 2016	Mount Lemmon	Mount Lemmon Survey	V	400 m	MPC · JPL
818260	2013 JY_{71}	—	October 23, 2015	Kitt Peak	Spacewatch	·	2.0 km	MPC · JPL
818261	2013 JA_{72}	—	October 28, 2014	Mount Lemmon	Mount Lemmon Survey	·	700 m	MPC · JPL
818262	2013 JF_{72}	—	June 24, 2014	Haleakala	Pan-STARRS 1	BAR	950 m	MPC · JPL
818263	2013 JL_{77}	—	May 11, 2013	Kitt Peak	Spacewatch	THB	2.3 km	MPC · JPL
818264	2013 JJ_{78}	—	May 8, 2013	Haleakala	Pan-STARRS 1	·	880 m	MPC · JPL
818265	2013 JK_{78}	—	May 15, 2013	Haleakala	Pan-STARRS 1	EUN	770 m	MPC · JPL
818266	2013 JT_{83}	—	May 15, 2013	Haleakala	Pan-STARRS 1	EOS	1.4 km	MPC · JPL
818267	2013 KU_{2}	—	April 29, 2013	Mount Lemmon	Mount Lemmon Survey	T_{j} (2.94)	2.5 km	MPC · JPL
818268	2013 KK_{7}	—	May 15, 2002	Palomar	NEAT	T_{j} (2.97)	2.8 km	MPC · JPL
818269	2013 KZ_{9}	—	May 18, 2013	Mount Lemmon	Mount Lemmon Survey	(2076)	600 m	MPC · JPL
818270	2013 KA_{10}	—	May 3, 2013	Mount Lemmon	Mount Lemmon Survey	·	1.0 km	MPC · JPL
818271	2013 KJ_{11}	—	May 30, 2013	Palomar	Palomar Transient Factory	·	850 m	MPC · JPL
818272	2013 KS_{11}	—	May 16, 2013	Mount Lemmon	Mount Lemmon Survey	T_{j} (2.99)	3.4 km	MPC · JPL
818273	2013 KN_{17}	—	May 21, 2013	Mount Lemmon	Mount Lemmon Survey	·	2.5 km	MPC · JPL
818274	2013 KY_{19}	—	May 16, 2013	Haleakala	Pan-STARRS 1	·	860 m	MPC · JPL
818275	2013 KH_{20}	—	May 19, 2013	Mount Lemmon	Mount Lemmon Survey	·	810 m	MPC · JPL
818276	2013 KR_{20}	—	May 31, 2013	Mount Lemmon	Mount Lemmon Survey	H	460 m	MPC · JPL
818277	2013 KX_{20}	—	May 16, 2013	Haleakala	Pan-STARRS 1	·	600 m	MPC · JPL
818278	2013 LO_{2}	—	April 15, 2013	Haleakala	Pan-STARRS 1	·	1.2 km	MPC · JPL
818279	2013 LB_{6}	—	May 10, 2013	Mount Lemmon	Mount Lemmon Survey	·	1.6 km	MPC · JPL
818280	2013 LR_{7}	—	June 7, 2013	Haleakala	Pan-STARRS 1	H	390 m	MPC · JPL
818281	2013 LS_{13}	—	June 5, 2013	Mount Lemmon	Mount Lemmon Survey	·	850 m	MPC · JPL
818282	2013 LF_{29}	—	June 13, 2013	Oukaïmeden	M. Ory	·	580 m	MPC · JPL
818283	2013 LY_{37}	—	June 8, 2013	Mount Lemmon	Mount Lemmon Survey	·	780 m	MPC · JPL
818284	2013 LA_{38}	—	June 5, 2013	Mount Lemmon	Mount Lemmon Survey	·	760 m	MPC · JPL
818285	2013 LY_{39}	—	June 7, 2013	Haleakala	Pan-STARRS 1	·	2.2 km	MPC · JPL
818286	2013 LB_{45}	—	June 7, 2013	Haleakala	Pan-STARRS 1	·	2.9 km	MPC · JPL
818287	2013 LL_{47}	—	June 7, 2013	Haleakala	Pan-STARRS 1	T_{j} (2.99)	2.6 km	MPC · JPL
818288	2013 MF_{2}	—	May 11, 2005	Mount Lemmon	Mount Lemmon Survey	PHO	830 m	MPC · JPL
818289	2013 MO_{5}	—	May 1, 2003	Kitt Peak	Spacewatch	·	450 m	MPC · JPL
818290	2013 MV_{5}	—	June 19, 2013	Haleakala	Pan-STARRS 1	·	760 m	MPC · JPL
818291	2013 MJ_{8}	—	June 5, 2013	Mount Lemmon	Mount Lemmon Survey	LUT	3.1 km	MPC · JPL
818292	2013 MK_{17}	—	August 10, 2016	Haleakala	Pan-STARRS 1	H	410 m	MPC · JPL
818293	2013 MG_{21}	—	June 17, 2013	Haleakala	Pan-STARRS 1	·	910 m	MPC · JPL
818294	2013 NQ_{13}	—	August 22, 2003	Palomar	NEAT	·	540 m	MPC · JPL
818295	2013 NQ_{17}	—	July 13, 2013	Mount Lemmon	Mount Lemmon Survey	·	950 m	MPC · JPL
818296	2013 NB_{20}	—	April 29, 2012	Kitt Peak	Spacewatch	·	2.6 km	MPC · JPL
818297	2013 NC_{21}	—	September 11, 2007	XuYi	PMO NEO Survey Program	·	910 m	MPC · JPL
818298	2013 NZ_{23}	—	July 14, 2013	Haleakala	Pan-STARRS 1	AMO	570 m	MPC · JPL
818299	2013 NW_{24}	—	July 6, 2013	Haleakala	Pan-STARRS 1	·	920 m	MPC · JPL
818300	2013 NJ_{25}	—	July 6, 2013	Haleakala	Pan-STARRS 1	·	880 m	MPC · JPL

== 818301–818400 ==
back to top

Designation			Discovery			Properties		Ref
Permanent	Provisional	Named after	Date	Site	Discoverer(s)	Category	Diam.	Ref
818301	2013 NN_{26}	—	July 6, 2013	Haleakala	Pan-STARRS 1	EUN	1.0 km	MPC · JPL
818302	2013 NP_{28}	—	July 2, 2013	Haleakala	Pan-STARRS 1	·	1.2 km	MPC · JPL
818303	2013 NM_{29}	—	July 14, 2013	Haleakala	Pan-STARRS 1	·	730 m	MPC · JPL
818304	2013 NX_{29}	—	July 14, 2013	Haleakala	Pan-STARRS 1	·	770 m	MPC · JPL
818305	2013 NS_{34}	—	October 9, 2015	Haleakala	Pan-STARRS 1	·	2.4 km	MPC · JPL
818306	2013 NG_{35}	—	July 14, 2013	Haleakala	Pan-STARRS 1	·	600 m	MPC · JPL
818307	2013 NK_{36}	—	July 9, 2013	Haleakala	Pan-STARRS 1	·	660 m	MPC · JPL
818308	2013 NY_{37}	—	July 4, 2013	Haleakala	Pan-STARRS 1	H	420 m	MPC · JPL
818309	2013 NW_{40}	—	July 15, 2013	Haleakala	Pan-STARRS 1	·	1.4 km	MPC · JPL
818310	2013 NK_{41}	—	January 24, 2006	Kitt Peak	Spacewatch	·	1.3 km	MPC · JPL
818311	2013 NZ_{41}	—	August 18, 2017	Haleakala	Pan-STARRS 1	·	930 m	MPC · JPL
818312	2013 NZ_{44}	—	January 26, 2017	Haleakala	Pan-STARRS 1	·	3.4 km	MPC · JPL
818313	2013 NS_{46}	—	July 2, 2013	Haleakala	Pan-STARRS 1	·	670 m	MPC · JPL
818314	2013 NP_{50}	—	July 13, 2013	Haleakala	Pan-STARRS 1	EOS	1.2 km	MPC · JPL
818315	2013 NH_{52}	—	July 14, 2013	Haleakala	Pan-STARRS 1	·	470 m	MPC · JPL
818316	2013 NO_{60}	—	July 12, 2013	Haleakala	Pan-STARRS 1	·	900 m	MPC · JPL
818317	2013 NH_{62}	—	July 1, 2013	Haleakala	Pan-STARRS 1	·	970 m	MPC · JPL
818318	2013 NA_{63}	—	July 14, 2013	Haleakala	Pan-STARRS 1	(5)	1.1 km	MPC · JPL
818319	2013 NN_{71}	—	July 12, 2013	Haleakala	Pan-STARRS 1	·	1.0 km	MPC · JPL
818320	2013 NQ_{71}	—	July 13, 2013	Haleakala	Pan-STARRS 1	·	1.0 km	MPC · JPL
818321	2013 NA_{73}	—	July 1, 2013	Haleakala	Pan-STARRS 1	·	970 m	MPC · JPL
818322	2013 NL_{82}	—	July 14, 2013	Haleakala	Pan-STARRS 1	·	760 m	MPC · JPL
818323	2013 OT	—	June 20, 2013	Haleakala	Pan-STARRS 1	MAR	640 m	MPC · JPL
818324	2013 OZ_{4}	—	September 14, 2002	Palomar Mountain	NEAT	(6769)	950 m	MPC · JPL
818325	2013 OR_{6}	—	July 28, 2013	Haleakala	Pan-STARRS 1	H	340 m	MPC · JPL
818326	2013 OW_{7}	—	July 30, 2013	Elena Remote	Oreshko, A.	·	1.1 km	MPC · JPL
818327	2013 OF_{8}	—	June 18, 2013	Mount Lemmon	Mount Lemmon Survey	·	2.0 km	MPC · JPL
818328	2013 OH_{10}	—	September 1, 2005	Kitt Peak	Spacewatch	·	730 m	MPC · JPL
818329	2013 ON_{12}	—	October 5, 2005	Kitt Peak	Spacewatch	·	840 m	MPC · JPL
818330	2013 OS_{15}	—	July 12, 2018	Haleakala	Pan-STARRS 1	·	1.4 km	MPC · JPL
818331	2013 OC_{16}	—	July 30, 2013	Kitt Peak	Spacewatch	·	950 m	MPC · JPL
818332	2013 OE_{17}	—	July 16, 2013	Haleakala	Pan-STARRS 1	EUN	810 m	MPC · JPL
818333	2013 PG_{1}	—	July 28, 2013	Haleakala	Pan-STARRS 1	·	2.3 km	MPC · JPL
818334	2013 PG_{3}	—	July 15, 2013	Haleakala	Pan-STARRS 1	H	400 m	MPC · JPL
818335	2013 PW_{3}	—	December 26, 2011	Mount Lemmon	Mount Lemmon Survey	H	420 m	MPC · JPL
818336	2013 PV_{5}	—	August 2, 2013	Haleakala	Pan-STARRS 1	·	1.6 km	MPC · JPL
818337	2013 PA_{12}	—	August 5, 2013	Elena Remote	Oreshko, A.	·	1.2 km	MPC · JPL
818338	2013 PP_{12}	—	January 19, 2012	Haleakala	Pan-STARRS 1	·	1.5 km	MPC · JPL
818339	2013 PH_{15}	—	July 14, 2013	Haleakala	Pan-STARRS 1	MAS	480 m	MPC · JPL
818340	2013 PE_{17}	—	August 8, 2013	Haleakala	Pan-STARRS 1	·	470 m	MPC · JPL
818341	2013 PZ_{21}	—	August 8, 2013	Kitt Peak	Spacewatch	·	710 m	MPC · JPL
818342	2013 PM_{26}	—	August 5, 2013	Palomar	Palomar Transient Factory	·	1.3 km	MPC · JPL
818343	2013 PZ_{29}	—	August 9, 2013	Haleakala	Pan-STARRS 1	·	2.2 km	MPC · JPL
818344	2013 PV_{39}	—	August 9, 2013	Kitt Peak	Spacewatch	V	410 m	MPC · JPL
818345	2013 PD_{42}	—	August 12, 2013	Haleakala	Pan-STARRS 1	PHO	670 m	MPC · JPL
818346	2013 PG_{47}	—	April 2, 2011	Mount Lemmon	Mount Lemmon Survey	DOR	1.5 km	MPC · JPL
818347	2013 PN_{48}	—	August 12, 2013	Kitt Peak	Spacewatch	·	750 m	MPC · JPL
818348	2013 PE_{52}	—	September 20, 2009	Mount Lemmon	Mount Lemmon Survey	·	1.0 km	MPC · JPL
818349	2013 PH_{54}	—	August 14, 2013	Haleakala	Pan-STARRS 1	·	2.4 km	MPC · JPL
818350	2013 PO_{54}	—	August 14, 2013	Haleakala	Pan-STARRS 1	·	1.4 km	MPC · JPL
818351	2013 PZ_{58}	—	August 15, 2013	Haleakala	Pan-STARRS 1	·	1.8 km	MPC · JPL
818352	2013 PC_{62}	—	August 15, 2013	Haleakala	Pan-STARRS 1	·	610 m	MPC · JPL
818353	2013 PW_{63}	—	August 8, 2013	Haleakala	Pan-STARRS 1	·	770 m	MPC · JPL
818354	2013 PD_{65}	—	July 15, 2013	Haleakala	Pan-STARRS 1	·	750 m	MPC · JPL
818355	2013 PY_{66}	—	August 15, 2013	Haleakala	Pan-STARRS 1	H	430 m	MPC · JPL
818356	2013 PY_{71}	—	August 17, 1999	Kitt Peak	Spacewatch	·	500 m	MPC · JPL
818357	2013 PZ_{74}	—	August 8, 2013	Haleakala	Pan-STARRS 1	H	380 m	MPC · JPL
818358	2013 PJ_{75}	—	August 4, 2013	Haleakala	Pan-STARRS 1	H	370 m	MPC · JPL
818359	2013 PT_{79}	—	August 8, 2013	Kitt Peak	Spacewatch	·	930 m	MPC · JPL
818360	2013 PV_{82}	—	August 28, 2009	Kitt Peak	Spacewatch	·	740 m	MPC · JPL
818361	2013 PT_{84}	—	August 2, 2013	Piszkéstető	K. Sárneczky	·	1.1 km	MPC · JPL
818362	2013 PL_{87}	—	August 9, 2013	Haleakala	Pan-STARRS 1	H	340 m	MPC · JPL
818363	2013 PV_{87}	—	February 29, 2016	Haleakala	Pan-STARRS 1	·	1.2 km	MPC · JPL
818364	2013 PA_{88}	—	August 15, 2013	Haleakala	Pan-STARRS 1	EUP	2.7 km	MPC · JPL
818365	2013 PX_{90}	—	August 9, 2013	Haleakala	Pan-STARRS 1	(8737)	2.4 km	MPC · JPL
818366	2013 PO_{91}	—	August 16, 2017	Haleakala	Pan-STARRS 1	·	880 m	MPC · JPL
818367	2013 PZ_{101}	—	August 15, 2013	Haleakala	Pan-STARRS 1	·	1.1 km	MPC · JPL
818368	2013 PL_{104}	—	August 9, 2013	Haleakala	Pan-STARRS 1	NYS	580 m	MPC · JPL
818369	2013 PE_{105}	—	August 15, 2013	Haleakala	Pan-STARRS 1	·	600 m	MPC · JPL
818370	2013 PK_{105}	—	August 14, 2013	Haleakala	Pan-STARRS 1	·	580 m	MPC · JPL
818371	2013 PN_{105}	—	August 12, 2013	Kitt Peak	Spacewatch	·	550 m	MPC · JPL
818372	2013 PD_{108}	—	August 12, 2013	Haleakala	Pan-STARRS 1	·	1.1 km	MPC · JPL
818373	2013 PC_{118}	—	August 12, 2013	Haleakala	Pan-STARRS 1	·	950 m	MPC · JPL
818374	2013 PS_{119}	—	August 4, 2013	Haleakala	Pan-STARRS 1	·	790 m	MPC · JPL
818375	2013 PM_{125}	—	August 15, 2013	Haleakala	Pan-STARRS 1	·	860 m	MPC · JPL
818376	2013 PC_{127}	—	August 12, 2013	Haleakala	Pan-STARRS 1	·	710 m	MPC · JPL
818377	2013 PT_{131}	—	August 15, 2013	Haleakala	Pan-STARRS 1	·	990 m	MPC · JPL
818378	2013 PG_{132}	—	August 14, 2013	Haleakala	Pan-STARRS 1	·	880 m	MPC · JPL
818379	2013 QH	—	August 8, 2013	Haleakala	Pan-STARRS 1	EOS	1.3 km	MPC · JPL
818380	2013 QD_{3}	—	August 27, 2009	Kitt Peak	Spacewatch	·	970 m	MPC · JPL
818381	2013 QV_{12}	—	August 15, 2013	Haleakala	Pan-STARRS 1	·	1.6 km	MPC · JPL
818382	2013 QD_{15}	—	August 9, 2013	Kitt Peak	Spacewatch	·	990 m	MPC · JPL
818383	2013 QA_{16}	—	June 20, 2013	Haleakala	Pan-STARRS 1	H	360 m	MPC · JPL
818384	2013 QJ_{17}	—	August 29, 2013	Haleakala	Pan-STARRS 1	H	420 m	MPC · JPL
818385	2013 QN_{22}	—	August 26, 2013	Haleakala	Pan-STARRS 1	·	1.7 km	MPC · JPL
818386	2013 QN_{25}	—	August 12, 2013	Kitt Peak	Spacewatch	·	480 m	MPC · JPL
818387	2013 QY_{31}	—	August 29, 2013	Haleakala	Pan-STARRS 1	·	450 m	MPC · JPL
818388	2013 QV_{34}	—	August 31, 2013	Elena Remote	Oreshko, A.	·	2.5 km	MPC · JPL
818389	2013 QG_{43}	—	August 28, 2013	Mount Lemmon	Mount Lemmon Survey	·	460 m	MPC · JPL
818390	2013 QD_{49}	—	April 14, 2012	Haleakala	Pan-STARRS 1	·	1.1 km	MPC · JPL
818391	2013 QW_{51}	—	August 30, 2013	Haleakala	Pan-STARRS 1	H	330 m	MPC · JPL
818392	2013 QE_{52}	—	August 28, 2013	Catalina	CSS	EUN	750 m	MPC · JPL
818393	2013 QX_{63}	—	August 10, 2013	Kitt Peak	Spacewatch	·	920 m	MPC · JPL
818394	2013 QJ_{73}	—	February 21, 2012	Kitt Peak	Spacewatch	·	1.2 km	MPC · JPL
818395	2013 QJ_{75}	—	August 14, 2013	Haleakala	Pan-STARRS 1	·	600 m	MPC · JPL
818396	2013 QA_{79}	—	August 12, 2013	Kitt Peak	Spacewatch	MAS	530 m	MPC · JPL
818397	2013 QV_{79}	—	August 28, 2013	Mount Lemmon	Mount Lemmon Survey	·	1.9 km	MPC · JPL
818398	2013 QJ_{80}	—	October 19, 2006	Kitt Peak	Deep Ecliptic Survey	·	750 m	MPC · JPL
818399	2013 QF_{84}	—	September 3, 2008	Kitt Peak	Spacewatch	·	1.7 km	MPC · JPL
818400	2013 QM_{85}	—	February 27, 2012	Haleakala	Pan-STARRS 1	·	980 m	MPC · JPL

== 818401–818500 ==
back to top

Designation			Discovery			Properties		Ref
Permanent	Provisional	Named after	Date	Site	Discoverer(s)	Category	Diam.	Ref
818401	2013 QJ_{92}	—	August 12, 2013	Haleakala	Pan-STARRS 1	CLA	1.2 km	MPC · JPL
818402	2013 QH_{93}	—	August 21, 2013	Haleakala	Pan-STARRS 1	·	1.4 km	MPC · JPL
818403	2013 QV_{95}	—	August 24, 2013	Haleakala	Pan-STARRS 1	H	380 m	MPC · JPL
818404	2013 QQ_{96}	—	March 18, 2016	Haleakala	Pan-STARRS 1	·	640 m	MPC · JPL
818405	2013 QT_{97}	—	August 31, 2013	Haleakala	Pan-STARRS 1	·	2.0 km	MPC · JPL
818406	2013 QG_{98}	—	February 11, 2016	Haleakala	Pan-STARRS 1	·	1.9 km	MPC · JPL
818407	2013 QM_{98}	—	August 26, 2013	Haleakala	Pan-STARRS 1	TIR	2.2 km	MPC · JPL
818408	2013 QO_{98}	—	July 25, 2017	Haleakala	Pan-STARRS 1	EUN	760 m	MPC · JPL
818409	2013 QT_{98}	—	August 31, 2013	Haleakala	Pan-STARRS 1	·	1.3 km	MPC · JPL
818410	2013 QF_{99}	—	August 14, 2017	Haleakala	Pan-STARRS 1	·	860 m	MPC · JPL
818411	2013 QZ_{99}	—	August 31, 2013	Haleakala	Pan-STARRS 1	MAR	760 m	MPC · JPL
818412	2013 QH_{100}	—	August 28, 2013	Mount Lemmon	Mount Lemmon Survey	·	920 m	MPC · JPL
818413	2013 QS_{100}	—	August 29, 2013	Haleakala	Pan-STARRS 1	615	860 m	MPC · JPL
818414	2013 QN_{101}	—	August 28, 2013	Mount Lemmon	Mount Lemmon Survey	·	710 m	MPC · JPL
818415	2013 QE_{102}	—	August 29, 2013	Haleakala	Pan-STARRS 1	·	480 m	MPC · JPL
818416	2013 QL_{102}	—	August 31, 2013	Haleakala	Pan-STARRS 1	·	2.6 km	MPC · JPL
818417	2013 QN_{104}	—	August 29, 2013	Haleakala	Pan-STARRS 1	TEL	980 m	MPC · JPL
818418	2013 RQ	—	September 1, 2013	Oukaïmeden	C. Rinner	·	920 m	MPC · JPL
818419	2013 RA_{1}	—	July 7, 2005	Mauna Kea	Veillet, C.	·	780 m	MPC · JPL
818420	2013 RS_{3}	—	September 1, 2013	Mount Lemmon	Mount Lemmon Survey	·	530 m	MPC · JPL
818421	2013 RD_{4}	—	September 1, 2013	Mount Lemmon	Mount Lemmon Survey	(3460)	2.2 km	MPC · JPL
818422	2013 RZ_{7}	—	August 15, 2013	Haleakala	Pan-STARRS 1	H	320 m	MPC · JPL
818423	2013 RF_{12}	—	August 28, 2013	Mount Lemmon	Mount Lemmon Survey	·	980 m	MPC · JPL
818424	2013 RG_{13}	—	August 15, 2013	Haleakala	Pan-STARRS 1	·	2.3 km	MPC · JPL
818425	2013 RB_{15}	—	December 8, 2010	Kitt Peak	Spacewatch	·	710 m	MPC · JPL
818426	2013 RW_{16}	—	August 28, 2013	Catalina	CSS	H	390 m	MPC · JPL
818427	2013 RC_{23}	—	August 12, 2013	Haleakala	Pan-STARRS 1	·	630 m	MPC · JPL
818428	2013 RR_{23}	—	September 3, 2013	Mount Lemmon	Mount Lemmon Survey	·	990 m	MPC · JPL
818429	2013 RS_{27}	—	September 4, 2013	Mount Lemmon	Mount Lemmon Survey	·	1.7 km	MPC · JPL
818430	2013 RX_{36}	—	October 29, 2008	Kitt Peak	Spacewatch	·	1.7 km	MPC · JPL
818431	2013 RZ_{40}	—	September 5, 2013	Kitt Peak	Spacewatch	·	660 m	MPC · JPL
818432	2013 RA_{41}	—	October 2, 2006	Mount Lemmon	Mount Lemmon Survey	NYS	640 m	MPC · JPL
818433	2013 RL_{42}	—	October 5, 2003	Kitt Peak	Spacewatch	·	580 m	MPC · JPL
818434	2013 RP_{42}	—	February 23, 2001	Cerro Tololo	Deep Lens Survey	·	610 m	MPC · JPL
818435	2013 RL_{49}	—	September 19, 2003	Kitt Peak	Spacewatch	H	250 m	MPC · JPL
818436	2013 RR_{49}	—	September 10, 2013	Haleakala	Pan-STARRS 1	H	380 m	MPC · JPL
818437	2013 RW_{49}	—	September 10, 2013	Haleakala	Pan-STARRS 1	·	1.8 km	MPC · JPL
818438	2013 RR_{52}	—	September 12, 2013	Elena Remote	Oreshko, A.	PHO	760 m	MPC · JPL
818439	2013 RD_{54}	—	September 12, 2013	Catalina	CSS	H	500 m	MPC · JPL
818440	2013 RA_{55}	—	September 9, 2013	Haleakala	Pan-STARRS 1	·	1.4 km	MPC · JPL
818441	2013 RG_{56}	—	September 10, 2013	Haleakala	Pan-STARRS 1	·	1.3 km	MPC · JPL
818442	2013 RS_{59}	—	September 10, 2013	Haleakala	Pan-STARRS 1	H	310 m	MPC · JPL
818443	2013 RR_{65}	—	September 3, 2013	Haleakala	Pan-STARRS 1	·	610 m	MPC · JPL
818444	2013 RY_{66}	—	October 17, 1995	Kitt Peak	Spacewatch	NYS	660 m	MPC · JPL
818445	2013 RH_{69}	—	September 13, 2013	Palomar	Palomar Transient Factory	·	1.3 km	MPC · JPL
818446	2013 RG_{71}	—	September 21, 2008	Kitt Peak	Spacewatch	·	1.5 km	MPC · JPL
818447	2013 RB_{72}	—	August 6, 2013	Piszkéstető	K. Sárneczky	·	1.2 km	MPC · JPL
818448	2013 RL_{87}	—	October 22, 2008	Kitt Peak	Spacewatch	·	2.0 km	MPC · JPL
818449	2013 RP_{88}	—	September 14, 2013	Kitt Peak	Spacewatch	·	550 m	MPC · JPL
818450	2013 RL_{96}	—	September 14, 2013	Haleakala	Pan-STARRS 1	·	1.4 km	MPC · JPL
818451	2013 RA_{99}	—	September 3, 2013	Haleakala	Pan-STARRS 1	H	350 m	MPC · JPL
818452	2013 RA_{103}	—	October 25, 2005	Mount Lemmon	Mount Lemmon Survey	(5)	790 m	MPC · JPL
818453	2013 RX_{103}	—	September 1, 2013	Mount Lemmon	Mount Lemmon Survey	·	860 m	MPC · JPL
818454	2013 RO_{110}	—	September 14, 2013	Mount Lemmon	Mount Lemmon Survey	·	1.0 km	MPC · JPL
818455	2013 RY_{110}	—	September 1, 2013	Haleakala	Pan-STARRS 1	·	500 m	MPC · JPL
818456	2013 RY_{111}	—	September 14, 2013	Haleakala	Pan-STARRS 1	EOS	1.7 km	MPC · JPL
818457	2013 RG_{112}	—	September 5, 2013	Catalina	CSS	·	1.1 km	MPC · JPL
818458	2013 RP_{113}	—	September 14, 2013	Haleakala	Pan-STARRS 1	·	890 m	MPC · JPL
818459	2013 RX_{113}	—	September 1, 2013	Mount Lemmon	Mount Lemmon Survey	·	610 m	MPC · JPL
818460	2013 RA_{114}	—	September 10, 2013	Haleakala	Pan-STARRS 1	·	630 m	MPC · JPL
818461	2013 RU_{114}	—	September 3, 2013	Kitt Peak	Spacewatch	MAS	530 m	MPC · JPL
818462	2013 RX_{121}	—	September 14, 2013	Haleakala	Pan-STARRS 1	DOR	1.9 km	MPC · JPL
818463	2013 RM_{129}	—	September 15, 2013	Haleakala	Pan-STARRS 1	·	1.0 km	MPC · JPL
818464	2013 RP_{132}	—	September 13, 2013	Mount Lemmon	Mount Lemmon Survey	NYS	570 m	MPC · JPL
818465	2013 RF_{133}	—	September 14, 2013	Haleakala	Pan-STARRS 1	·	1.5 km	MPC · JPL
818466	2013 RX_{135}	—	October 2, 2006	Mount Lemmon	Mount Lemmon Survey	·	690 m	MPC · JPL
818467	2013 RM_{136}	—	September 14, 2013	Mount Lemmon	Mount Lemmon Survey	MAS	510 m	MPC · JPL
818468	2013 RB_{137}	—	September 5, 2013	Catalina	CSS	·	660 m	MPC · JPL
818469	2013 RS_{137}	—	September 15, 2013	Mount Lemmon	Mount Lemmon Survey	·	2.2 km	MPC · JPL
818470	2013 RF_{140}	—	September 1, 2013	Haleakala	Pan-STARRS 1	·	580 m	MPC · JPL
818471	2013 RT_{140}	—	September 13, 2013	Mount Lemmon	Mount Lemmon Survey	·	690 m	MPC · JPL
818472	2013 RW_{140}	—	September 5, 2013	Kitt Peak	Spacewatch	·	870 m	MPC · JPL
818473	2013 RL_{143}	—	September 13, 2013	Mount Lemmon	Mount Lemmon Survey	·	690 m	MPC · JPL
818474	2013 RT_{143}	—	September 6, 2013	Kitt Peak	Spacewatch	·	1.1 km	MPC · JPL
818475	2013 RH_{145}	—	September 10, 2013	Haleakala	Pan-STARRS 1	·	540 m	MPC · JPL
818476	2013 RA_{150}	—	September 14, 2013	Haleakala	Pan-STARRS 1	·	1.3 km	MPC · JPL
818477	2013 RU_{151}	—	September 5, 2013	Kitt Peak	Spacewatch	·	1.2 km	MPC · JPL
818478	2013 RT_{152}	—	September 15, 2013	Haleakala	Pan-STARRS 1	·	740 m	MPC · JPL
818479	2013 RT_{163}	—	September 14, 2013	Mount Lemmon	Mount Lemmon Survey	·	1.9 km	MPC · JPL
818480	2013 SW_{5}	—	August 22, 2004	Kitt Peak	Spacewatch	·	1.1 km	MPC · JPL
818481	2013 SN_{6}	—	September 17, 2013	Mount Lemmon	Mount Lemmon Survey	·	1.1 km	MPC · JPL
818482	2013 SA_{10}	—	August 25, 2005	Palomar	NEAT	T_{j} (2.98) · 3:2	3.3 km	MPC · JPL
818483	2013 SS_{10}	—	October 11, 2010	Mount Lemmon	Mount Lemmon Survey	·	550 m	MPC · JPL
818484	2013 SL_{11}	—	September 9, 2013	Haleakala	Pan-STARRS 1	·	560 m	MPC · JPL
818485	2013 SJ_{17}	—	November 5, 2007	Mount Lemmon	Mount Lemmon Survey	·	650 m	MPC · JPL
818486	2013 SB_{18}	—	September 2, 2013	Mount Lemmon	Mount Lemmon Survey	·	1.3 km	MPC · JPL
818487	2013 SJ_{20}	—	September 24, 2013	La Sagra	OAM	·	940 m	MPC · JPL
818488	2013 SM_{21}	—	November 2, 2010	Mount Lemmon	Mount Lemmon Survey	·	550 m	MPC · JPL
818489	2013 SZ_{21}	—	April 11, 2008	Kitt Peak	Spacewatch	BRG	1.1 km	MPC · JPL
818490	2013 SV_{25}	—	September 28, 2013	Oukaïmeden	C. Rinner	·	2.4 km	MPC · JPL
818491	2013 SY_{27}	—	October 2, 2013	Catalina	CSS	JUN	970 m	MPC · JPL
818492	2013 SN_{28}	—	September 25, 2013	Catalina	CSS	·	1.3 km	MPC · JPL
818493	2013 SB_{29}	—	August 31, 2008	Moletai	K. Černis, Zdanavicius, J.	·	1.8 km	MPC · JPL
818494	2013 SW_{29}	—	June 19, 2006	Mount Lemmon	Mount Lemmon Survey	·	560 m	MPC · JPL
818495	2013 SK_{35}	—	September 17, 2006	Kitt Peak	Spacewatch	·	650 m	MPC · JPL
818496	2013 SL_{38}	—	November 13, 2010	Kitt Peak	Spacewatch	·	560 m	MPC · JPL
818497	2013 SC_{40}	—	September 9, 2013	Haleakala	Pan-STARRS 1	·	1.1 km	MPC · JPL
818498	2013 SK_{40}	—	September 16, 2013	Mount Lemmon	Mount Lemmon Survey	·	960 m	MPC · JPL
818499	2013 SB_{42}	—	September 9, 2013	Haleakala	Pan-STARRS 1	BRG	1.1 km	MPC · JPL
818500	2013 SO_{44}	—	November 9, 2009	Mount Lemmon	Mount Lemmon Survey	·	1.1 km	MPC · JPL

== 818501–818600 ==
back to top

Designation			Discovery			Properties		Ref
Permanent	Provisional	Named after	Date	Site	Discoverer(s)	Category	Diam.	Ref
818501	2013 ST_{45}	—	August 29, 2013	Haleakala	Pan-STARRS 1	H	290 m	MPC · JPL
818502	2013 SL_{47}	—	September 2, 2013	Mount Lemmon	Mount Lemmon Survey	·	1.2 km	MPC · JPL
818503	2013 ST_{56}	—	September 20, 2009	Mount Lemmon	Mount Lemmon Survey	·	1.4 km	MPC · JPL
818504	2013 SK_{57}	—	February 17, 2004	Kitt Peak	Spacewatch	NYS	730 m	MPC · JPL
818505	2013 SX_{58}	—	September 30, 2013	Kitt Peak	Spacewatch	·	2.0 km	MPC · JPL
818506	2013 SG_{61}	—	August 15, 2013	Haleakala	Pan-STARRS 1	·	2.0 km	MPC · JPL
818507	2013 SF_{77}	—	September 23, 2008	Kitt Peak	Spacewatch	H	370 m	MPC · JPL
818508	2013 SU_{82}	—	September 30, 2013	Mount Lemmon	Mount Lemmon Survey	·	880 m	MPC · JPL
818509	2013 SN_{85}	—	September 13, 2013	Črni Vrh	Mikuž, H.	·	990 m	MPC · JPL
818510	2013 SU_{90}	—	August 29, 2006	Kitt Peak	Spacewatch	·	550 m	MPC · JPL
818511	2013 SM_{95}	—	August 12, 2004	Cerro Tololo	Deep Ecliptic Survey	·	1.1 km	MPC · JPL
818512	2013 SB_{100}	—	September 21, 2013	Haleakala	Pan-STARRS 1	H	560 m	MPC · JPL
818513	2013 SM_{101}	—	September 24, 2013	Haleakala	Pan-STARRS 1	·	2.7 km	MPC · JPL
818514	2013 SU_{102}	—	February 10, 2015	Mount Lemmon	Mount Lemmon Survey	·	870 m	MPC · JPL
818515	2013 SU_{103}	—	September 17, 2013	Mount Lemmon	Mount Lemmon Survey	·	1.5 km	MPC · JPL
818516	2013 SY_{104}	—	February 9, 2016	Haleakala	Pan-STARRS 1	·	2.5 km	MPC · JPL
818517	2013 SL_{105}	—	September 27, 2013	Haleakala	Pan-STARRS 1	·	2.5 km	MPC · JPL
818518	2013 SP_{105}	—	September 17, 2013	Mount Lemmon	Mount Lemmon Survey	·	790 m	MPC · JPL
818519	2013 SZ_{107}	—	September 30, 2013	Mount Lemmon	Mount Lemmon Survey	V	470 m	MPC · JPL
818520	2013 SM_{109}	—	September 23, 2013	Haleakala	Pan-STARRS 1	·	670 m	MPC · JPL
818521	2013 ST_{109}	—	September 28, 2013	Mount Lemmon	Mount Lemmon Survey	·	1.3 km	MPC · JPL
818522	2013 SC_{110}	—	September 28, 2013	Mount Lemmon	Mount Lemmon Survey	·	480 m	MPC · JPL
818523	2013 ST_{110}	—	September 23, 2013	Calar Alto	S. Hellmich, G. Hahn	EOS	1.2 km	MPC · JPL
818524	2013 TH_{2}	—	October 18, 2009	Mount Lemmon	Mount Lemmon Survey	·	1.0 km	MPC · JPL
818525	2013 TN_{7}	—	October 16, 2009	Mount Lemmon	Mount Lemmon Survey	·	1.5 km	MPC · JPL
818526	2013 TD_{8}	—	October 2, 2013	Kitt Peak	Spacewatch	·	560 m	MPC · JPL
818527	2013 TB_{17}	—	October 29, 2002	Palomar	NEAT	·	1.9 km	MPC · JPL
818528	2013 TC_{17}	—	January 29, 2011	Mount Lemmon	Mount Lemmon Survey	V	410 m	MPC · JPL
818529	2013 TC_{20}	—	February 13, 2011	Mount Lemmon	Mount Lemmon Survey	NYS	830 m	MPC · JPL
818530	2013 TW_{20}	—	October 1, 2013	Mount Lemmon	Mount Lemmon Survey	THM	1.6 km	MPC · JPL
818531	2013 TY_{23}	—	October 1, 2013	Kitt Peak	Spacewatch	·	550 m	MPC · JPL
818532	2013 TC_{24}	—	October 1, 2013	Kitt Peak	Spacewatch	·	1 km	MPC · JPL
818533	2013 TD_{26}	—	September 15, 2013	Mount Lemmon	Mount Lemmon Survey	·	1.1 km	MPC · JPL
818534	2013 TA_{29}	—	September 6, 2013	Kitt Peak	Spacewatch	NYS	1.2 km	MPC · JPL
818535	2013 TZ_{34}	—	September 15, 2009	Kitt Peak	Spacewatch	·	660 m	MPC · JPL
818536	2013 TH_{37}	—	October 2, 2013	Haleakala	Pan-STARRS 1	HNS	770 m	MPC · JPL
818537	2013 TF_{40}	—	September 1, 2005	Kitt Peak	Spacewatch	·	790 m	MPC · JPL
818538	2013 TR_{40}	—	October 2, 2013	Mount Lemmon	Mount Lemmon Survey	·	760 m	MPC · JPL
818539	2013 TB_{45}	—	October 24, 2008	Mount Lemmon	Mount Lemmon Survey	·	1.3 km	MPC · JPL
818540	2013 TG_{52}	—	October 3, 2013	Catalina	CSS	·	560 m	MPC · JPL
818541	2013 TL_{52}	—	October 4, 2013	Kitt Peak	Spacewatch	·	1.3 km	MPC · JPL
818542	2013 TV_{60}	—	October 4, 2013	Mount Lemmon	Mount Lemmon Survey	·	530 m	MPC · JPL
818543	2013 TE_{61}	—	October 3, 2013	Kitt Peak	Spacewatch	·	1.5 km	MPC · JPL
818544	2013 TG_{62}	—	September 10, 2007	Mount Lemmon	Mount Lemmon Survey	·	2.6 km	MPC · JPL
818545	2013 TD_{66}	—	October 4, 2013	Mount Lemmon	Mount Lemmon Survey	·	1.0 km	MPC · JPL
818546	2013 TU_{84}	—	September 13, 2013	Kitt Peak	Spacewatch	·	1.3 km	MPC · JPL
818547	2013 TC_{89}	—	January 4, 2011	Mount Lemmon	Mount Lemmon Survey	·	450 m	MPC · JPL
818548	2013 TT_{90}	—	October 2, 2006	Mount Lemmon	Mount Lemmon Survey	·	560 m	MPC · JPL
818549	2013 TH_{96}	—	July 30, 2009	Kitt Peak	Spacewatch	·	1.0 km	MPC · JPL
818550	2013 TB_{99}	—	October 2, 2013	Kitt Peak	Spacewatch	EMA	2.2 km	MPC · JPL
818551	2013 TB_{109}	—	April 22, 2012	Mount Lemmon	Mount Lemmon Survey	·	680 m	MPC · JPL
818552	2013 TJ_{109}	—	October 3, 2013	Kitt Peak	Spacewatch	(1547)	1.3 km	MPC · JPL
818553	2013 TG_{124}	—	January 28, 2007	Mount Lemmon	Mount Lemmon Survey	·	840 m	MPC · JPL
818554	2013 TR_{126}	—	October 6, 2013	Mount Lemmon	Mount Lemmon Survey	·	2.2 km	MPC · JPL
818555	2013 TN_{128}	—	September 6, 2013	Kitt Peak	Spacewatch	·	530 m	MPC · JPL
818556	2013 TF_{129}	—	September 28, 2009	Mount Lemmon	Mount Lemmon Survey	·	750 m	MPC · JPL
818557	2013 TK_{134}	—	October 3, 2013	Haleakala	Pan-STARRS 1	·	530 m	MPC · JPL
818558	2013 TW_{134}	—	October 12, 2013	Oukaïmeden	C. Rinner	·	900 m	MPC · JPL
818559	2013 TK_{136}	—	October 1, 2013	Palomar	Palomar Transient Factory	·	1.2 km	MPC · JPL
818560	2013 TE_{138}	—	October 10, 2013	Cala d'Hort	Observatiorio Cala d'Hort	·	1.9 km	MPC · JPL
818561	2013 TJ_{142}	—	October 1, 2005	Kitt Peak	Spacewatch	H	330 m	MPC · JPL
818562	2013 TW_{146}	—	February 11, 2012	Mount Lemmon	Mount Lemmon Survey	·	450 m	MPC · JPL
818563	2013 TJ_{149}	—	October 5, 2013	Kitt Peak	Research and Education Collaborative Occultation Network	·	1.3 km	MPC · JPL
818564	2013 TV_{156}	—	October 14, 2013	Mount Lemmon	Mount Lemmon Survey	·	1.3 km	MPC · JPL
818565	2013 TB_{160}	—	October 8, 2013	Mount Lemmon	Mount Lemmon Survey	H	350 m	MPC · JPL
818566	2013 TD_{160}	—	October 3, 2013	Mount Lemmon	Mount Lemmon Survey	H	300 m	MPC · JPL
818567	2013 TO_{160}	—	April 26, 2006	Kitt Peak	Spacewatch	T_{j} (2.98)	3.0 km	MPC · JPL
818568	2013 TO_{165}	—	October 1, 2013	Kitt Peak	Spacewatch	·	1.9 km	MPC · JPL
818569	2013 TW_{165}	—	October 2, 2013	Haleakala	Pan-STARRS 1	·	2.1 km	MPC · JPL
818570	2013 TX_{167}	—	July 29, 2008	Kitt Peak	Spacewatch	·	1.6 km	MPC · JPL
818571	2013 TZ_{167}	—	October 3, 2013	Haleakala	Pan-STARRS 1	·	1.4 km	MPC · JPL
818572	2013 TJ_{169}	—	October 5, 2013	Haleakala	Pan-STARRS 1	·	2.5 km	MPC · JPL
818573	2013 TG_{173}	—	October 3, 2013	Mount Lemmon	Mount Lemmon Survey	·	600 m	MPC · JPL
818574	2013 TP_{173}	—	October 13, 2013	Mount Lemmon	Mount Lemmon Survey	·	1.1 km	MPC · JPL
818575	2013 TD_{174}	—	October 12, 2013	XuYi	PMO NEO Survey Program	·	1.4 km	MPC · JPL
818576	2013 TK_{176}	—	October 5, 2013	Kitt Peak	Spacewatch	·	530 m	MPC · JPL
818577	2013 TD_{178}	—	October 3, 2013	Mount Lemmon	Mount Lemmon Survey	·	1.1 km	MPC · JPL
818578	2013 TD_{179}	—	October 4, 2013	Mount Lemmon	Mount Lemmon Survey	·	840 m	MPC · JPL
818579	2013 TD_{182}	—	October 5, 2013	Haleakala	Pan-STARRS 1	·	2.5 km	MPC · JPL
818580	2013 TO_{182}	—	October 9, 2013	Mount Lemmon	Mount Lemmon Survey	·	800 m	MPC · JPL
818581	2013 TA_{183}	—	October 5, 2013	Haleakala	Pan-STARRS 1	·	620 m	MPC · JPL
818582	2013 TJ_{183}	—	October 2, 2013	Catalina	CSS	·	1.7 km	MPC · JPL
818583	2013 TC_{184}	—	August 31, 2017	Mount Lemmon	Mount Lemmon Survey	HNS	940 m	MPC · JPL
818584	2013 TQ_{186}	—	October 8, 2013	Kitt Peak	Spacewatch	H	320 m	MPC · JPL
818585	2013 TW_{186}	—	October 6, 2013	Catalina	CSS	·	1.4 km	MPC · JPL
818586	2013 TH_{188}	—	February 11, 2015	Mount Lemmon	Mount Lemmon Survey	·	610 m	MPC · JPL
818587	2013 TZ_{189}	—	October 9, 2013	Kitt Peak	Spacewatch	·	2.2 km	MPC · JPL
818588	2013 TM_{192}	—	October 1, 2013	Mount Lemmon	Mount Lemmon Survey	·	850 m	MPC · JPL
818589	2013 TU_{192}	—	October 3, 2013	Haleakala	Pan-STARRS 1	·	1.3 km	MPC · JPL
818590	2013 TX_{192}	—	October 2, 2013	Kitt Peak	Spacewatch	·	520 m	MPC · JPL
818591	2013 TV_{194}	—	October 2, 2013	Haleakala	Pan-STARRS 1	·	1.4 km	MPC · JPL
818592	2013 TH_{195}	—	October 14, 2013	Kitt Peak	Spacewatch	·	520 m	MPC · JPL
818593	2013 TH_{196}	—	October 3, 2013	Kitt Peak	Spacewatch	(2076)	520 m	MPC · JPL
818594	2013 TE_{197}	—	October 5, 2013	Haleakala	Pan-STARRS 1	·	480 m	MPC · JPL
818595	2013 TC_{198}	—	October 3, 2013	Kitt Peak	Spacewatch	·	580 m	MPC · JPL
818596	2013 TD_{198}	—	October 12, 2013	Kitt Peak	Spacewatch	·	820 m	MPC · JPL
818597	2013 TW_{198}	—	October 9, 2013	Kitt Peak	Spacewatch	·	2.2 km	MPC · JPL
818598	2013 TS_{201}	—	October 3, 2013	Catalina	CSS	·	2.9 km	MPC · JPL
818599	2013 TW_{201}	—	October 13, 2013	Mount Lemmon	Mount Lemmon Survey	H	350 m	MPC · JPL
818600	2013 TQ_{202}	—	October 8, 2013	Kitt Peak	Spacewatch	·	960 m	MPC · JPL

== 818601–818700 ==
back to top

Designation			Discovery			Properties		Ref
Permanent	Provisional	Named after	Date	Site	Discoverer(s)	Category	Diam.	Ref
818601	2013 TJ_{203}	—	October 3, 2013	Haleakala	Pan-STARRS 1	·	780 m	MPC · JPL
818602	2013 TS_{203}	—	October 4, 2013	Mount Lemmon	Mount Lemmon Survey	·	830 m	MPC · JPL
818603	2013 TT_{203}	—	October 9, 2013	Mount Lemmon	Mount Lemmon Survey	·	690 m	MPC · JPL
818604	2013 TF_{205}	—	October 5, 2013	Haleakala	Pan-STARRS 1	·	760 m	MPC · JPL
818605	2013 TJ_{205}	—	October 3, 2013	Haleakala	Pan-STARRS 1	·	1.2 km	MPC · JPL
818606	2013 TN_{205}	—	October 4, 2013	Mount Lemmon	Mount Lemmon Survey	EUN	730 m	MPC · JPL
818607	2013 TU_{205}	—	February 29, 2012	Kitt Peak	Spacewatch	·	430 m	MPC · JPL
818608	2013 TZ_{209}	—	October 15, 2013	Mount Lemmon	Mount Lemmon Survey	·	850 m	MPC · JPL
818609	2013 TL_{219}	—	October 5, 2013	Haleakala	Pan-STARRS 1	·	880 m	MPC · JPL
818610	2013 TA_{221}	—	December 12, 2006	Kitt Peak	Spacewatch	·	710 m	MPC · JPL
818611	2013 TP_{222}	—	October 14, 2013	Kitt Peak	Spacewatch	·	500 m	MPC · JPL
818612	2013 TN_{224}	—	October 4, 2013	Mount Lemmon	Mount Lemmon Survey	·	1.3 km	MPC · JPL
818613	2013 TR_{239}	—	October 13, 2013	Mount Lemmon	Mount Lemmon Survey	·	1.4 km	MPC · JPL
818614	2013 TS_{242}	—	October 3, 2013	Kitt Peak	Spacewatch	·	1.3 km	MPC · JPL
818615	2013 TB_{244}	—	October 2, 2013	Mount Lemmon	Mount Lemmon Survey	·	1.2 km	MPC · JPL
818616	2013 TA_{248}	—	October 5, 2013	Haleakala	Pan-STARRS 1	·	2.2 km	MPC · JPL
818617	2013 TJ_{248}	—	October 5, 2013	Haleakala	Pan-STARRS 1	L5	5.7 km	MPC · JPL
818618	2013 TV_{285}	—	October 5, 2013	Haleakala	Pan-STARRS 1	·	1.3 km	MPC · JPL
818619	2013 UT	—	November 6, 2005	Mount Lemmon	Mount Lemmon Survey	·	1.4 km	MPC · JPL
818620	2013 UZ_{1}	—	October 21, 2013	Haleakala	Pan-STARRS 1	H	420 m	MPC · JPL
818621	2013 UJ_{2}	—	October 23, 2013	Haleakala	Pan-STARRS 1	H	360 m	MPC · JPL
818622	2013 UK_{2}	—	October 23, 2013	Haleakala	Pan-STARRS 1	H	480 m	MPC · JPL
818623	2013 UV_{2}	—	November 9, 2008	Mount Lemmon	Mount Lemmon Survey	H	400 m	MPC · JPL
818624	2013 UA_{6}	—	October 3, 2013	Mount Lemmon	Mount Lemmon Survey	NYS	780 m	MPC · JPL
818625	2013 UO_{10}	—	October 6, 2013	Mount Lemmon	Mount Lemmon Survey	H	370 m	MPC · JPL
818626	2013 UR_{10}	—	October 24, 2013	Palomar	Palomar Transient Factory	H	340 m	MPC · JPL
818627	2013 UK_{13}	—	January 10, 2007	Kitt Peak	Spacewatch	NYS	1.2 km	MPC · JPL
818628	2013 UG_{19}	—	October 30, 2013	Haleakala	Pan-STARRS 1	BRG	1.3 km	MPC · JPL
818629	2013 UB_{20}	—	October 24, 2013	Mount Lemmon	Mount Lemmon Survey	·	1.3 km	MPC · JPL
818630	2013 UE_{22}	—	October 23, 2013	Haleakala	Pan-STARRS 1	·	530 m	MPC · JPL
818631	2013 UF_{24}	—	October 26, 2013	Kitt Peak	Spacewatch	·	740 m	MPC · JPL
818632	2013 UN_{24}	—	October 26, 2013	Kitt Peak	Spacewatch	(5)	900 m	MPC · JPL
818633	2013 UH_{25}	—	October 31, 2013	Piszkéstető	K. Sárneczky	·	790 m	MPC · JPL
818634	2013 UR_{25}	—	October 3, 2013	Kitt Peak	Spacewatch	·	710 m	MPC · JPL
818635	2013 UD_{26}	—	October 23, 2013	Mount Lemmon	Mount Lemmon Survey	·	790 m	MPC · JPL
818636	2013 UR_{30}	—	October 25, 2013	Haleakala	Pan-STARRS 1	H	270 m	MPC · JPL
818637	2013 UL_{31}	—	July 14, 2016	Haleakala	Pan-STARRS 1	·	520 m	MPC · JPL
818638	2013 UW_{31}	—	July 30, 2017	Haleakala	Pan-STARRS 1	·	1.3 km	MPC · JPL
818639	2013 UZ_{33}	—	October 24, 2013	Mount Lemmon	Mount Lemmon Survey	MAS	670 m	MPC · JPL
818640	2013 UK_{34}	—	October 23, 2013	Mount Lemmon	Mount Lemmon Survey	·	760 m	MPC · JPL
818641	2013 UC_{35}	—	October 22, 2013	Mount Lemmon	Mount Lemmon Survey	·	730 m	MPC · JPL
818642	2013 UD_{35}	—	October 23, 2013	Kitt Peak	Spacewatch	H	450 m	MPC · JPL
818643	2013 UD_{38}	—	October 25, 2013	Mount Lemmon	Mount Lemmon Survey	·	570 m	MPC · JPL
818644	2013 UG_{40}	—	October 24, 2013	Mount Lemmon	Mount Lemmon Survey	·	900 m	MPC · JPL
818645	2013 UD_{41}	—	October 25, 2013	Mount Lemmon	Mount Lemmon Survey	MAS	530 m	MPC · JPL
818646	2013 UW_{41}	—	October 25, 2013	Kitt Peak	Spacewatch	·	760 m	MPC · JPL
818647	2013 UA_{42}	—	October 28, 2013	Mount Lemmon	Mount Lemmon Survey	·	910 m	MPC · JPL
818648	2013 UE_{45}	—	October 24, 2013	Mount Lemmon	Mount Lemmon Survey	·	950 m	MPC · JPL
818649	2013 UA_{56}	—	October 26, 2013	Mount Lemmon	Mount Lemmon Survey	·	1.2 km	MPC · JPL
818650	2013 VB	—	March 28, 2012	Haleakala	Pan-STARRS 1	H	410 m	MPC · JPL
818651	2013 VY_{4}	—	November 4, 2013	Catalina	CSS	·	1.4 km	MPC · JPL
818652	2013 VH_{5}	—	April 24, 2006	Kitt Peak	Spacewatch	·	560 m	MPC · JPL
818653	2013 VT_{6}	—	November 10, 2006	Kitt Peak	Spacewatch	·	760 m	MPC · JPL
818654	2013 VY_{8}	—	September 29, 2013	Catalina	CSS	·	1.2 km	MPC · JPL
818655	2013 VB_{9}	—	October 3, 2005	Kitt Peak	Spacewatch	H	330 m	MPC · JPL
818656	2013 VU_{11}	—	October 26, 2013	Mount Lemmon	Mount Lemmon Survey	·	430 m	MPC · JPL
818657	2013 VY_{16}	—	January 14, 2012	Haleakala	Pan-STARRS 1	·	500 m	MPC · JPL
818658	2013 VQ_{17}	—	October 31, 2008	Mount Lemmon	Mount Lemmon Survey	·	1.5 km	MPC · JPL
818659	2013 VO_{24}	—	April 25, 2007	Kitt Peak	Spacewatch	H	470 m	MPC · JPL
818660 Capar	2013 VP_{24}	Capar	November 6, 2013	Tincana	Zolnowski, M., Kusiak, M.	H	370 m	MPC · JPL
818661	2013 VR_{24}	—	April 27, 2012	Haleakala	Pan-STARRS 1	H	390 m	MPC · JPL
818662	2013 VD_{27}	—	November 1, 2013	Kitt Peak	Spacewatch	·	1.4 km	MPC · JPL
818663	2013 VM_{31}	—	November 2, 2013	Kitt Peak	Spacewatch	·	510 m	MPC · JPL
818664	2013 VP_{31}	—	November 9, 2013	Haleakala	Pan-STARRS 1	·	710 m	MPC · JPL
818665	2013 VE_{32}	—	November 11, 2013	Nogales	M. Schwartz, P. R. Holvorcem	·	1.5 km	MPC · JPL
818666	2013 VH_{32}	—	November 9, 2013	Haleakala	Pan-STARRS 1	·	820 m	MPC · JPL
818667	2013 VP_{32}	—	November 9, 2013	Haleakala	Pan-STARRS 1	(5)	870 m	MPC · JPL
818668	2013 VX_{32}	—	November 2, 2013	Mount Lemmon	Mount Lemmon Survey	·	1.2 km	MPC · JPL
818669	2013 VG_{33}	—	November 6, 2013	XuYi	PMO NEO Survey Program	·	1.0 km	MPC · JPL
818670	2013 VM_{33}	—	November 9, 2013	Haleakala	Pan-STARRS 1	·	590 m	MPC · JPL
818671	2013 VP_{34}	—	November 4, 2013	Haleakala	Pan-STARRS 1	·	890 m	MPC · JPL
818672	2013 VG_{36}	—	November 9, 2013	Mount Lemmon	Mount Lemmon Survey	(5)	940 m	MPC · JPL
818673	2013 VU_{36}	—	November 11, 2013	Mount Lemmon	Mount Lemmon Survey	H	400 m	MPC · JPL
818674	2013 VE_{37}	—	November 2, 2013	Kitt Peak	Spacewatch	·	920 m	MPC · JPL
818675	2013 VM_{37}	—	October 7, 2013	Mount Lemmon	Mount Lemmon Survey	·	990 m	MPC · JPL
818676	2013 VU_{38}	—	November 26, 2013	Haleakala	Pan-STARRS 1	MIS	1.9 km	MPC · JPL
818677	2013 VT_{41}	—	November 8, 2013	Kitt Peak	Spacewatch	·	1.6 km	MPC · JPL
818678	2013 VV_{41}	—	November 14, 2013	Mount Lemmon	Mount Lemmon Survey	·	1.9 km	MPC · JPL
818679	2013 VC_{42}	—	September 8, 2017	Haleakala	Pan-STARRS 1	·	1.6 km	MPC · JPL
818680	2013 VL_{42}	—	November 12, 2013	Mount Lemmon	Mount Lemmon Survey	LIX	2.6 km	MPC · JPL
818681	2013 VS_{42}	—	November 10, 2013	Kitt Peak	Spacewatch	·	560 m	MPC · JPL
818682	2013 VK_{43}	—	October 24, 2013	Kitt Peak	Spacewatch	·	1.1 km	MPC · JPL
818683	2013 VX_{44}	—	November 6, 2013	Haleakala	Pan-STARRS 1	·	990 m	MPC · JPL
818684	2013 VU_{45}	—	May 19, 2006	Mount Lemmon	Mount Lemmon Survey	THB	2.1 km	MPC · JPL
818685	2013 VB_{46}	—	November 9, 2013	Mount Lemmon	Mount Lemmon Survey	·	990 m	MPC · JPL
818686	2013 VN_{52}	—	November 12, 2013	Kitt Peak	Spacewatch	·	550 m	MPC · JPL
818687	2013 VD_{58}	—	November 2, 2013	Mount Lemmon	Mount Lemmon Survey	H	310 m	MPC · JPL
818688	2013 VB_{59}	—	November 1, 2013	Mount Lemmon	Mount Lemmon Survey	·	560 m	MPC · JPL
818689	2013 VH_{64}	—	November 8, 2013	Catalina	CSS	·	520 m	MPC · JPL
818690	2013 VZ_{66}	—	November 11, 2013	Mount Lemmon	Mount Lemmon Survey	·	2.2 km	MPC · JPL
818691	2013 VB_{69}	—	November 8, 2013	Kitt Peak	Spacewatch	·	910 m	MPC · JPL
818692	2013 VF_{69}	—	November 1, 2013	Mount Lemmon	Mount Lemmon Survey	·	760 m	MPC · JPL
818693	2013 VY_{75}	—	May 30, 2009	Mount Lemmon	Mount Lemmon Survey	·	620 m	MPC · JPL
818694	2013 VU_{77}	—	October 26, 2013	Catalina	CSS	·	3.0 km	MPC · JPL
818695	2013 VS_{84}	—	November 9, 2013	Haleakala	Pan-STARRS 1	·	1.4 km	MPC · JPL
818696	2013 WC_{5}	—	November 9, 2013	Kitt Peak	Spacewatch	HOF	2.0 km	MPC · JPL
818697	2013 WS_{8}	—	November 26, 2013	Mount Lemmon	Mount Lemmon Survey	NYS	770 m	MPC · JPL
818698	2013 WN_{13}	—	November 27, 2013	Haleakala	Pan-STARRS 1	EOS	1.4 km	MPC · JPL
818699	2013 WO_{14}	—	October 26, 2013	Mount Lemmon	Mount Lemmon Survey	·	1.1 km	MPC · JPL
818700	2013 WM_{19}	—	November 23, 2009	Mount Lemmon	Mount Lemmon Survey	·	810 m	MPC · JPL

== 818701–818800 ==
back to top

Designation			Discovery			Properties		Ref
Permanent	Provisional	Named after	Date	Site	Discoverer(s)	Category	Diam.	Ref
818701	2013 WM_{25}	—	November 9, 2013	Mount Lemmon	Mount Lemmon Survey	EUN	660 m	MPC · JPL
818702	2013 WV_{25}	—	November 24, 2013	Haleakala	Pan-STARRS 1	·	2.3 km	MPC · JPL
818703	2013 WP_{27}	—	September 8, 2004	Palomar	NEAT	JUN	960 m	MPC · JPL
818704	2013 WK_{30}	—	October 24, 2013	Kitt Peak	Spacewatch	·	590 m	MPC · JPL
818705	2013 WT_{36}	—	November 27, 2013	Haleakala	Pan-STARRS 1	·	960 m	MPC · JPL
818706	2013 WZ_{36}	—	November 27, 2013	Haleakala	Pan-STARRS 1	·	1.1 km	MPC · JPL
818707	2013 WJ_{37}	—	November 27, 2013	Haleakala	Pan-STARRS 1	·	1.4 km	MPC · JPL
818708	2013 WC_{40}	—	October 9, 2013	Mount Lemmon	Mount Lemmon Survey	·	1.7 km	MPC · JPL
818709	2013 WF_{43}	—	February 9, 2007	Catalina	CSS	·	870 m	MPC · JPL
818710	2013 WH_{45}	—	November 26, 2005	Mount Lemmon	Mount Lemmon Survey	·	330 m	MPC · JPL
818711	2013 WM_{48}	—	November 26, 2009	Kitt Peak	Spacewatch	·	1.1 km	MPC · JPL
818712	2013 WE_{53}	—	November 25, 2013	Haleakala	Pan-STARRS 1	·	700 m	MPC · JPL
818713	2013 WA_{56}	—	September 27, 2006	Mount Lemmon	Mount Lemmon Survey	·	700 m	MPC · JPL
818714	2013 WY_{56}	—	January 5, 2006	Mount Lemmon	Mount Lemmon Survey	·	1.1 km	MPC · JPL
818715	2013 WX_{60}	—	November 27, 2013	Kitt Peak	Spacewatch	·	690 m	MPC · JPL
818716	2013 WU_{67}	—	November 27, 2013	Haleakala	Pan-STARRS 1	·	520 m	MPC · JPL
818717	2013 WE_{71}	—	November 8, 2013	Kitt Peak	Spacewatch	·	1.4 km	MPC · JPL
818718	2013 WP_{71}	—	December 17, 2006	Mount Lemmon	Mount Lemmon Survey	·	510 m	MPC · JPL
818719	2013 WL_{72}	—	November 26, 2013	Mount Lemmon	Mount Lemmon Survey	(5)	1.0 km	MPC · JPL
818720	2013 WV_{76}	—	November 9, 2013	Haleakala	Pan-STARRS 1	EUN	910 m	MPC · JPL
818721	2013 WW_{77}	—	October 26, 2013	Mount Lemmon	Mount Lemmon Survey	PHO	690 m	MPC · JPL
818722	2013 WC_{79}	—	September 25, 2006	Kitt Peak	Spacewatch	(2076)	520 m	MPC · JPL
818723	2013 WN_{83}	—	November 27, 2013	Haleakala	Pan-STARRS 1	·	700 m	MPC · JPL
818724	2013 WB_{85}	—	November 27, 2013	Haleakala	Pan-STARRS 1	BAR	1.1 km	MPC · JPL
818725	2013 WQ_{89}	—	October 9, 2013	Mount Lemmon	Mount Lemmon Survey	·	690 m	MPC · JPL
818726	2013 WK_{95}	—	November 8, 2013	Kitt Peak	Spacewatch	·	590 m	MPC · JPL
818727	2013 WD_{97}	—	November 28, 2013	Mount Lemmon	Mount Lemmon Survey	·	1.2 km	MPC · JPL
818728	2013 WY_{101}	—	February 11, 2011	Mount Lemmon	Mount Lemmon Survey	·	560 m	MPC · JPL
818729	2013 WU_{102}	—	November 29, 2013	Mount Lemmon	Mount Lemmon Survey	·	1.0 km	MPC · JPL
818730	2013 WQ_{104}	—	January 16, 2010	Mount Nyukasa	Japan Aerospace Exploration Agency	·	1.2 km	MPC · JPL
818731	2013 WZ_{106}	—	November 1, 2013	Nogales	M. Schwartz, P. R. Holvorcem	·	1.1 km	MPC · JPL
818732	2013 WK_{108}	—	November 28, 2013	Mount Lemmon	Mount Lemmon Survey	BAR	1.1 km	MPC · JPL
818733	2013 WT_{111}	—	September 23, 2008	Kitt Peak	Spacewatch	HOF	2.0 km	MPC · JPL
818734	2013 WV_{111}	—	November 27, 2013	Haleakala	Pan-STARRS 1	EUN	960 m	MPC · JPL
818735	2013 WE_{114}	—	October 8, 2013	Mount Lemmon	Mount Lemmon Survey	·	1.2 km	MPC · JPL
818736	2013 WO_{114}	—	November 29, 2013	Haleakala	Pan-STARRS 1	·	990 m	MPC · JPL
818737	2013 WP_{114}	—	October 26, 2013	Mount Lemmon	Mount Lemmon Survey	(5)	980 m	MPC · JPL
818738	2013 WU_{114}	—	November 27, 2013	Haleakala	Pan-STARRS 1	·	1 km	MPC · JPL
818739	2013 WB_{115}	—	November 27, 2013	Haleakala	Pan-STARRS 1	·	1.3 km	MPC · JPL
818740	2013 WD_{115}	—	November 4, 2013	XuYi	PMO NEO Survey Program	·	1.3 km	MPC · JPL
818741	2013 WP_{115}	—	November 29, 2013	Mount Lemmon	Mount Lemmon Survey	HNS	1.1 km	MPC · JPL
818742	2013 WU_{116}	—	November 28, 2013	Kitt Peak	Spacewatch	·	1.2 km	MPC · JPL
818743	2013 WU_{117}	—	November 26, 2013	Mount Lemmon	Mount Lemmon Survey	·	610 m	MPC · JPL
818744	2013 WD_{118}	—	November 28, 2013	Mount Lemmon	Mount Lemmon Survey	NYS	740 m	MPC · JPL
818745	2013 WN_{118}	—	October 31, 2013	Mount Lemmon	Mount Lemmon Survey	·	490 m	MPC · JPL
818746	2013 WU_{118}	—	November 28, 2013	Mount Lemmon	Mount Lemmon Survey	·	1.6 km	MPC · JPL
818747	2013 WE_{119}	—	May 25, 2015	Haleakala	Pan-STARRS 2	·	550 m	MPC · JPL
818748	2013 WJ_{119}	—	January 27, 2007	Mount Lemmon	Mount Lemmon Survey	3:2	3.8 km	MPC · JPL
818749	2013 WR_{120}	—	March 24, 2015	Kitt Peak	Spacewatch	·	520 m	MPC · JPL
818750	2013 WJ_{124}	—	December 30, 2014	Haleakala	Pan-STARRS 1	·	2.0 km	MPC · JPL
818751	2013 WW_{126}	—	November 26, 2013	Haleakala	Pan-STARRS 1	(5)	740 m	MPC · JPL
818752	2013 WH_{127}	—	November 27, 2013	Haleakala	Pan-STARRS 1	·	500 m	MPC · JPL
818753	2013 WH_{128}	—	November 26, 2013	Mount Lemmon	Mount Lemmon Survey	HYG	1.8 km	MPC · JPL
818754	2013 WP_{130}	—	November 28, 2013	Mount Lemmon	Mount Lemmon Survey	·	1.2 km	MPC · JPL
818755	2013 WV_{132}	—	November 27, 2013	Haleakala	Pan-STARRS 1	NYS	800 m	MPC · JPL
818756	2013 WW_{133}	—	November 27, 2013	Haleakala	Pan-STARRS 1	·	690 m	MPC · JPL
818757	2013 WY_{133}	—	November 27, 2013	Haleakala	Pan-STARRS 1	·	580 m	MPC · JPL
818758	2013 WQ_{134}	—	November 27, 2013	Haleakala	Pan-STARRS 1	(2076)	590 m	MPC · JPL
818759	2013 WG_{136}	—	November 29, 2013	Haleakala	Pan-STARRS 1	BRA	1.1 km	MPC · JPL
818760	2013 WZ_{143}	—	November 27, 2013	Haleakala	Pan-STARRS 1	·	1.4 km	MPC · JPL
818761	2013 XZ_{2}	—	December 3, 2013	Haleakala	Pan-STARRS 1	H	390 m	MPC · JPL
818762	2013 XL_{3}	—	December 14, 2010	Catalina	CSS	H	530 m	MPC · JPL
818763	2013 XE_{10}	—	December 6, 2013	Haleakala	Pan-STARRS 1	·	460 m	MPC · JPL
818764	2013 XQ_{10}	—	October 28, 2013	Mount Lemmon	Mount Lemmon Survey	H	390 m	MPC · JPL
818765	2013 XT_{12}	—	November 28, 2013	Mount Lemmon	Mount Lemmon Survey	H	380 m	MPC · JPL
818766	2013 XE_{13}	—	November 28, 2013	Mount Lemmon	Mount Lemmon Survey	V	380 m	MPC · JPL
818767	2013 XD_{19}	—	April 24, 2012	Haleakala	Pan-STARRS 1	H	360 m	MPC · JPL
818768	2013 XH_{26}	—	December 5, 2013	Haleakala	Pan-STARRS 1	H	430 m	MPC · JPL
818769	2013 XK_{27}	—	January 12, 2010	Kitt Peak	Spacewatch	HNS	920 m	MPC · JPL
818770	2013 XR_{28}	—	December 11, 2013	Mount Lemmon	Mount Lemmon Survey	JUN	870 m	MPC · JPL
818771	2013 XB_{29}	—	December 10, 2013	Mount Lemmon	Mount Lemmon Survey	·	1.3 km	MPC · JPL
818772	2013 XD_{29}	—	December 6, 2013	Haleakala	Pan-STARRS 1	·	1.1 km	MPC · JPL
818773	2013 XJ_{29}	—	September 30, 2003	Kitt Peak	Spacewatch	·	1.6 km	MPC · JPL
818774	2013 XQ_{29}	—	December 6, 2013	Haleakala	Pan-STARRS 1	HNS	770 m	MPC · JPL
818775	2013 XY_{29}	—	December 11, 2013	Haleakala	Pan-STARRS 1	·	1.3 km	MPC · JPL
818776	2013 XB_{30}	—	December 4, 2013	Haleakala	Pan-STARRS 1	·	1.0 km	MPC · JPL
818777	2013 XC_{30}	—	October 21, 2017	Mount Lemmon	Mount Lemmon Survey	ADE	1.4 km	MPC · JPL
818778	2013 XK_{30}	—	February 25, 2015	Haleakala	Pan-STARRS 1	·	1.0 km	MPC · JPL
818779	2013 XP_{30}	—	September 27, 2000	Sacramento Peak	SDSS	·	1 km	MPC · JPL
818780	2013 XB_{31}	—	December 4, 2013	Haleakala	Pan-STARRS 1	·	910 m	MPC · JPL
818781	2013 XN_{31}	—	December 4, 2013	Haleakala	Pan-STARRS 1	·	730 m	MPC · JPL
818782	2013 XE_{32}	—	October 21, 2016	Mount Lemmon	Mount Lemmon Survey	·	720 m	MPC · JPL
818783	2013 XT_{33}	—	December 4, 2013	Haleakala	Pan-STARRS 1	·	1.2 km	MPC · JPL
818784	2013 XO_{36}	—	December 14, 2013	Mount Lemmon	Mount Lemmon Survey	·	400 m	MPC · JPL
818785	2013 XG_{37}	—	April 18, 2015	Cerro Tololo	DECam	·	660 m	MPC · JPL
818786	2013 XX_{37}	—	December 11, 2013	Mount Lemmon	Mount Lemmon Survey	V	450 m	MPC · JPL
818787	2013 XC_{39}	—	December 11, 2013	Haleakala	Pan-STARRS 1	·	600 m	MPC · JPL
818788	2013 XS_{40}	—	December 13, 2013	Mount Lemmon	Mount Lemmon Survey	·	1.2 km	MPC · JPL
818789	2013 XW_{40}	—	December 11, 2013	Mount Lemmon	Mount Lemmon Survey	·	1.5 km	MPC · JPL
818790	2013 YE_{4}	—	December 23, 2013	Mount Lemmon	Mount Lemmon Survey	·	600 m	MPC · JPL
818791	2013 YS_{6}	—	December 24, 2013	Mount Lemmon	Mount Lemmon Survey	·	1.0 km	MPC · JPL
818792	2013 YY_{10}	—	December 24, 2013	Mount Lemmon	Mount Lemmon Survey	(1547)	1.5 km	MPC · JPL
818793	2013 YO_{11}	—	December 24, 2013	Haleakala	Pan-STARRS 1	·	650 m	MPC · JPL
818794	2013 YJ_{12}	—	September 18, 2009	Mount Lemmon	Mount Lemmon Survey	·	610 m	MPC · JPL
818795	2013 YV_{14}	—	December 29, 2005	Mount Lemmon	Mount Lemmon Survey	H	400 m	MPC · JPL
818796	2013 YY_{17}	—	October 10, 2007	Mount Lemmon	Mount Lemmon Survey	·	1.8 km	MPC · JPL
818797	2013 YW_{19}	—	December 25, 2013	Kitt Peak	Spacewatch	H	440 m	MPC · JPL
818798	2013 YA_{24}	—	October 26, 2013	Mount Lemmon	Mount Lemmon Survey	·	1.3 km	MPC · JPL
818799	2013 YG_{24}	—	November 11, 2013	Kitt Peak	Spacewatch	·	1.4 km	MPC · JPL
818800	2013 YN_{25}	—	November 27, 2013	Haleakala	Pan-STARRS 1	H	360 m	MPC · JPL

== 818801–818900 ==
back to top

Designation			Discovery			Properties		Ref
Permanent	Provisional	Named after	Date	Site	Discoverer(s)	Category	Diam.	Ref
818801	2013 YQ_{25}	—	November 2, 2013	Kitt Peak	Spacewatch	·	1.9 km	MPC · JPL
818802	2013 YO_{26}	—	December 23, 2013	Mount Lemmon	Mount Lemmon Survey	·	1.0 km	MPC · JPL
818803	2013 YW_{26}	—	December 23, 2013	Mount Lemmon	Mount Lemmon Survey	H	460 m	MPC · JPL
818804	2013 YD_{27}	—	October 5, 2005	Mount Lemmon	Mount Lemmon Survey	·	780 m	MPC · JPL
818805	2013 YJ_{27}	—	March 13, 2007	Mount Lemmon	Mount Lemmon Survey	·	700 m	MPC · JPL
818806	2013 YM_{28}	—	January 25, 2007	Kitt Peak	Spacewatch	NYS	750 m	MPC · JPL
818807	2013 YS_{29}	—	November 28, 2013	Haleakala	Pan-STARRS 1	BAR	1.1 km	MPC · JPL
818808	2013 YU_{33}	—	January 20, 2001	Kitt Peak	Spacewatch	·	1.4 km	MPC · JPL
818809	2013 YL_{35}	—	October 3, 2013	Mount Lemmon	Mount Lemmon Survey	·	1.4 km	MPC · JPL
818810	2013 YY_{37}	—	December 1, 2005	Catalina	CSS	H	410 m	MPC · JPL
818811	2013 YP_{40}	—	November 27, 2013	Haleakala	Pan-STARRS 1	·	1.4 km	MPC · JPL
818812	2013 YG_{42}	—	December 25, 2013	Kitt Peak	Spacewatch	H	380 m	MPC · JPL
818813	2013 YJ_{44}	—	December 26, 2013	Haleakala	Pan-STARRS 1	PHO	850 m	MPC · JPL
818814	2013 YM_{44}	—	February 16, 2010	Kitt Peak	Spacewatch	·	830 m	MPC · JPL
818815	2013 YC_{46}	—	December 27, 2013	Kitt Peak	Spacewatch	·	570 m	MPC · JPL
818816	2013 YR_{50}	—	November 25, 2013	Haleakala	Pan-STARRS 1	·	1.3 km	MPC · JPL
818817	2013 YB_{55}	—	December 25, 2013	Mount Lemmon	Mount Lemmon Survey	·	460 m	MPC · JPL
818818	2013 YM_{56}	—	November 28, 2013	Mount Lemmon	Mount Lemmon Survey	PHO	530 m	MPC · JPL
818819	2013 YK_{57}	—	December 26, 2013	Haleakala	Pan-STARRS 1	HNS	920 m	MPC · JPL
818820	2013 YP_{58}	—	December 26, 2013	Mount Lemmon	Mount Lemmon Survey	·	470 m	MPC · JPL
818821	2013 YV_{61}	—	November 21, 2009	Mount Lemmon	Mount Lemmon Survey	·	1.2 km	MPC · JPL
818822	2013 YN_{63}	—	December 27, 2013	Kitt Peak	Spacewatch	·	560 m	MPC · JPL
818823	2013 YW_{64}	—	December 28, 2013	Mount Lemmon	Mount Lemmon Survey	·	1.4 km	MPC · JPL
818824	2013 YF_{71}	—	January 30, 2011	Mount Lemmon	Mount Lemmon Survey	·	690 m	MPC · JPL
818825	2013 YG_{71}	—	December 2, 2013	Mount Lemmon	Mount Lemmon Survey	·	820 m	MPC · JPL
818826	2013 YR_{71}	—	November 28, 2013	Mount Lemmon	Mount Lemmon Survey	DOR	1.7 km	MPC · JPL
818827	2013 YA_{73}	—	December 25, 2013	Mount Lemmon	Mount Lemmon Survey	·	1.3 km	MPC · JPL
818828	2013 YU_{73}	—	December 25, 2013	Kitt Peak	Spacewatch	·	570 m	MPC · JPL
818829	2013 YW_{74}	—	December 26, 2013	Kitt Peak	Spacewatch	·	1.4 km	MPC · JPL
818830	2013 YZ_{74}	—	December 26, 2013	Mount Lemmon	Mount Lemmon Survey	·	1.0 km	MPC · JPL
818831	2013 YO_{79}	—	April 2, 2011	Mount Lemmon	Mount Lemmon Survey	·	560 m	MPC · JPL
818832	2013 YA_{81}	—	December 28, 2013	Kitt Peak	Spacewatch	·	560 m	MPC · JPL
818833	2013 YK_{81}	—	December 28, 2013	Kitt Peak	Spacewatch	·	550 m	MPC · JPL
818834	2013 YL_{82}	—	December 28, 2013	Kitt Peak	Spacewatch	EUN	860 m	MPC · JPL
818835	2013 YD_{87}	—	December 28, 2013	Kitt Peak	Spacewatch	ADE	1.5 km	MPC · JPL
818836	2013 YC_{88}	—	December 28, 2013	Kitt Peak	Spacewatch	·	820 m	MPC · JPL
818837	2013 YN_{88}	—	June 3, 2011	Mount Lemmon	Mount Lemmon Survey	·	770 m	MPC · JPL
818838	2013 YF_{92}	—	December 7, 2013	Kitt Peak	Spacewatch	·	930 m	MPC · JPL
818839	2013 YR_{93}	—	April 2, 2011	Mount Lemmon	Mount Lemmon Survey	·	500 m	MPC · JPL
818840	2013 YX_{93}	—	November 25, 2009	Kitt Peak	Spacewatch	NYS	760 m	MPC · JPL
818841	2013 YN_{98}	—	November 21, 2005	Kitt Peak	Spacewatch	NYS	820 m	MPC · JPL
818842	2013 YB_{103}	—	December 3, 2008	Mount Lemmon	Mount Lemmon Survey	·	1.3 km	MPC · JPL
818843	2013 YN_{104}	—	November 27, 2013	Haleakala	Pan-STARRS 1	H	500 m	MPC · JPL
818844	2013 YG_{107}	—	January 28, 2007	Mount Lemmon	Mount Lemmon Survey	·	650 m	MPC · JPL
818845	2013 YC_{110}	—	January 15, 2010	Kitt Peak	Spacewatch	·	1.6 km	MPC · JPL
818846	2013 YV_{112}	—	December 30, 2013	Kitt Peak	Spacewatch	ERI	980 m	MPC · JPL
818847	2013 YU_{113}	—	December 30, 2013	Kitt Peak	Spacewatch	·	730 m	MPC · JPL
818848	2013 YH_{114}	—	December 30, 2013	Kitt Peak	Spacewatch	·	1.8 km	MPC · JPL
818849	2013 YX_{120}	—	December 30, 2013	Haleakala	Pan-STARRS 1	·	1.2 km	MPC · JPL
818850	2013 YP_{129}	—	December 31, 2013	Haleakala	Pan-STARRS 1	H	440 m	MPC · JPL
818851	2013 YR_{131}	—	October 9, 2008	Catalina	CSS	·	1.5 km	MPC · JPL
818852	2013 YJ_{137}	—	December 31, 2013	Mount Lemmon	Mount Lemmon Survey	·	830 m	MPC · JPL
818853	2013 YN_{138}	—	December 6, 2013	Haleakala	Pan-STARRS 1	(2076)	510 m	MPC · JPL
818854	2013 YB_{139}	—	December 31, 2008	Kitt Peak	Spacewatch	·	1.6 km	MPC · JPL
818855	2013 YH_{139}	—	November 16, 2009	Mount Lemmon	Mount Lemmon Survey	·	1.7 km	MPC · JPL
818856	2013 YA_{143}	—	December 31, 2013	Mount Lemmon	Mount Lemmon Survey	·	550 m	MPC · JPL
818857	2013 YJ_{147}	—	July 7, 2005	Mauna Kea	Veillet, C.	·	570 m	MPC · JPL
818858	2013 YK_{149}	—	November 28, 2013	Mount Lemmon	Mount Lemmon Survey	H	480 m	MPC · JPL
818859	2013 YP_{151}	—	December 24, 2013	Mount Lemmon	Mount Lemmon Survey	·	790 m	MPC · JPL
818860	2013 YU_{155}	—	December 31, 2013	Kitt Peak	Spacewatch	·	1.5 km	MPC · JPL
818861	2013 YP_{156}	—	December 31, 2013	Mount Lemmon	Mount Lemmon Survey	PHO	1.0 km	MPC · JPL
818862	2013 YN_{157}	—	December 28, 2013	Kitt Peak	Spacewatch	EUN	910 m	MPC · JPL
818863	2013 YD_{159}	—	December 31, 2013	Mount Lemmon	Mount Lemmon Survey	·	2.0 km	MPC · JPL
818864	2013 YS_{160}	—	December 31, 2013	Mount Lemmon	Mount Lemmon Survey	·	1.6 km	MPC · JPL
818865	2013 YW_{160}	—	December 30, 2013	Mount Lemmon	Mount Lemmon Survey	(5)	950 m	MPC · JPL
818866	2013 YJ_{161}	—	January 28, 2015	Haleakala	Pan-STARRS 1	·	2.4 km	MPC · JPL
818867	2013 YC_{163}	—	December 28, 2013	Kitt Peak	Spacewatch	·	710 m	MPC · JPL
818868	2013 YT_{165}	—	December 23, 2013	Mount Lemmon	Mount Lemmon Survey	·	600 m	MPC · JPL
818869	2013 YF_{166}	—	April 1, 2011	Kitt Peak	Spacewatch	·	770 m	MPC · JPL
818870	2013 YQ_{168}	—	December 30, 2013	Mount Lemmon	Mount Lemmon Survey	NYS	800 m	MPC · JPL
818871	2013 YU_{173}	—	December 30, 2013	Mount Lemmon	Mount Lemmon Survey	·	1.5 km	MPC · JPL
818872	2013 YN_{175}	—	December 25, 2013	Mount Lemmon	Mount Lemmon Survey	·	1.5 km	MPC · JPL
818873	2014 AP_{2}	—	January 1, 2014	Haleakala	Pan-STARRS 1	·	1.1 km	MPC · JPL
818874	2014 AV_{5}	—	March 13, 2011	Mount Lemmon	Mount Lemmon Survey	·	810 m	MPC · JPL
818875	2014 AQ_{11}	—	October 9, 2013	Mount Lemmon	Mount Lemmon Survey	EUN	780 m	MPC · JPL
818876	2014 AX_{15}	—	December 28, 2013	Catalina	CSS	·	1.8 km	MPC · JPL
818877	2014 AJ_{16}	—	December 24, 2013	Mount Lemmon	Mount Lemmon Survey	H	520 m	MPC · JPL
818878	2014 AH_{23}	—	January 3, 2014	Kitt Peak	Spacewatch	·	770 m	MPC · JPL
818879	2014 AC_{25}	—	January 3, 2014	Kitt Peak	Spacewatch	V	480 m	MPC · JPL
818880	2014 AU_{28}	—	May 14, 2012	Haleakala	Pan-STARRS 1	H	420 m	MPC · JPL
818881	2014 AF_{29}	—	November 28, 2013	Kitt Peak	Spacewatch	H	340 m	MPC · JPL
818882	2014 AC_{32}	—	January 4, 2014	Haleakala	Pan-STARRS 1	H	380 m	MPC · JPL
818883	2014 AG_{32}	—	January 6, 2014	Haleakala	Pan-STARRS 1	H	390 m	MPC · JPL
818884	2014 AH_{32}	—	January 6, 2014	Haleakala	Pan-STARRS 1	H	320 m	MPC · JPL
818885	2014 AQ_{34}	—	December 24, 2013	Mount Lemmon	Mount Lemmon Survey	·	1.0 km	MPC · JPL
818886	2014 AF_{39}	—	December 11, 2013	Catalina	CSS	·	850 m	MPC · JPL
818887	2014 AZ_{39}	—	September 23, 2009	Mount Lemmon	Mount Lemmon Survey	·	600 m	MPC · JPL
818888	2014 AP_{44}	—	November 9, 2013	Mount Lemmon	Mount Lemmon Survey	·	1.2 km	MPC · JPL
818889	2014 AD_{45}	—	December 27, 2006	Mount Lemmon	Mount Lemmon Survey	·	670 m	MPC · JPL
818890	2014 AS_{45}	—	December 31, 2013	Haleakala	Pan-STARRS 1	HNS	940 m	MPC · JPL
818891	2014 AM_{49}	—	January 7, 2014	Kitt Peak	Spacewatch	·	690 m	MPC · JPL
818892	2014 AO_{53}	—	January 4, 2014	Mount Lemmon	Mount Lemmon Survey	H	490 m	MPC · JPL
818893	2014 AM_{54}	—	September 23, 2008	Mount Lemmon	Mount Lemmon Survey	·	1.3 km	MPC · JPL
818894	2014 AY_{54}	—	March 3, 2006	Mount Lemmon	Mount Lemmon Survey	(5)	840 m	MPC · JPL
818895	2014 AV_{55}	—	December 31, 2013	Haleakala	Pan-STARRS 1	H	340 m	MPC · JPL
818896	2014 AD_{56}	—	January 5, 2014	Haleakala	Pan-STARRS 1	H	370 m	MPC · JPL
818897	2014 AV_{60}	—	January 10, 2014	Mount Lemmon	Mount Lemmon Survey	·	830 m	MPC · JPL
818898	2014 AA_{61}	—	March 26, 2006	Mount Lemmon	Mount Lemmon Survey	·	1.4 km	MPC · JPL
818899	2014 AO_{62}	—	January 9, 2014	Haleakala	Pan-STARRS 1	H	450 m	MPC · JPL
818900	2014 AP_{62}	—	January 3, 2014	Mount Lemmon	Mount Lemmon Survey	·	870 m	MPC · JPL

== 818901–819000 ==
back to top

Designation			Discovery			Properties		Ref
Permanent	Provisional	Named after	Date	Site	Discoverer(s)	Category	Diam.	Ref
818901	2014 AH_{64}	—	January 10, 2014	Mount Lemmon	Mount Lemmon Survey	·	1.6 km	MPC · JPL
818902	2014 AD_{65}	—	July 13, 2016	Haleakala	Pan-STARRS 1	·	2.2 km	MPC · JPL
818903	2014 AB_{68}	—	January 10, 2014	Mount Lemmon	Mount Lemmon Survey	·	740 m	MPC · JPL
818904	2014 AH_{68}	—	January 1, 2014	Haleakala	Pan-STARRS 1	·	840 m	MPC · JPL
818905	2014 AA_{69}	—	January 10, 2014	Mount Lemmon	Mount Lemmon Survey	·	2.4 km	MPC · JPL
818906	2014 AG_{69}	—	January 10, 2014	Mount Lemmon	Mount Lemmon Survey	·	1.7 km	MPC · JPL
818907	2014 AU_{69}	—	January 9, 2014	Mount Lemmon	Mount Lemmon Survey	·	1.4 km	MPC · JPL
818908	2014 AB_{70}	—	January 11, 2014	Mount Lemmon	Mount Lemmon Survey	·	1.3 km	MPC · JPL
818909	2014 AL_{70}	—	January 1, 2014	Kitt Peak	Spacewatch	·	900 m	MPC · JPL
818910	2014 AW_{71}	—	January 9, 2014	Mount Lemmon	Mount Lemmon Survey	MAS	420 m	MPC · JPL
818911	2014 AX_{73}	—	January 10, 2014	Mount Lemmon	Mount Lemmon Survey	·	750 m	MPC · JPL
818912	2014 AM_{74}	—	April 7, 2007	Mount Lemmon	Mount Lemmon Survey	NYS	930 m	MPC · JPL
818913	2014 AZ_{74}	—	January 1, 2014	Mount Lemmon	Mount Lemmon Survey	·	900 m	MPC · JPL
818914	2014 BF	—	January 18, 2014	Haleakala	Pan-STARRS 1	H	490 m	MPC · JPL
818915	2014 BD_{1}	—	February 6, 2007	Mount Lemmon	Mount Lemmon Survey	·	570 m	MPC · JPL
818916	2014 BP_{1}	—	December 31, 2013	Haleakala	Pan-STARRS 1	H	360 m	MPC · JPL
818917	2014 BP_{4}	—	January 3, 2014	Catalina	CSS	·	1.7 km	MPC · JPL
818918	2014 BB_{6}	—	August 25, 2005	Campo Imperatore	CINEOS	NYS	1.0 km	MPC · JPL
818919	2014 BC_{9}	—	April 7, 2017	Haleakala	Pan-STARRS 1	H	410 m	MPC · JPL
818920	2014 BB_{14}	—	October 4, 2004	Kitt Peak	Spacewatch	·	1.1 km	MPC · JPL
818921	2014 BG_{16}	—	January 2, 2014	Kitt Peak	Spacewatch	·	1.7 km	MPC · JPL
818922	2014 BX_{17}	—	September 26, 2012	Mount Lemmon	Mount Lemmon Survey	·	1.3 km	MPC · JPL
818923	2014 BZ_{18}	—	November 3, 2005	Mount Lemmon	Mount Lemmon Survey	·	800 m	MPC · JPL
818924	2014 BO_{19}	—	August 26, 2003	Cerro Tololo	Deep Ecliptic Survey	3:2 · SHU	3.3 km	MPC · JPL
818925	2014 BM_{32}	—	August 26, 2012	Haleakala	Pan-STARRS 1	·	930 m	MPC · JPL
818926	2014 BH_{33}	—	March 6, 2003	Sacramento Peak	SDSS	H	510 m	MPC · JPL
818927	2014 BQ_{37}	—	January 23, 2014	Mount Lemmon	Mount Lemmon Survey	·	1.2 km	MPC · JPL
818928	2014 BT_{39}	—	March 13, 2007	Kitt Peak	Spacewatch	·	750 m	MPC · JPL
818929	2014 BS_{49}	—	August 26, 2012	Haleakala	Pan-STARRS 1	·	1.6 km	MPC · JPL
818930	2014 BE_{52}	—	January 1, 2014	Haleakala	Pan-STARRS 1	·	1.5 km	MPC · JPL
818931	2014 BB_{68}	—	October 11, 2012	Haleakala	Pan-STARRS 1	·	1.1 km	MPC · JPL
818932	2014 BP_{70}	—	January 24, 2014	Haleakala	Pan-STARRS 1	·	1.5 km	MPC · JPL
818933	2014 BX_{70}	—	September 30, 2003	Kitt Peak	Spacewatch	·	1.6 km	MPC · JPL
818934	2014 BB_{72}	—	January 21, 2014	Mount Lemmon	Mount Lemmon Survey	H	400 m	MPC · JPL
818935	2014 BC_{74}	—	January 25, 2014	Haleakala	Pan-STARRS 1	·	1.6 km	MPC · JPL
818936	2014 BD_{75}	—	January 23, 2014	Kitt Peak	Spacewatch	·	790 m	MPC · JPL
818937	2014 BP_{76}	—	January 28, 2014	Kitt Peak	Spacewatch	·	1.5 km	MPC · JPL
818938	2014 BS_{76}	—	January 25, 2014	Haleakala	Pan-STARRS 1	·	560 m	MPC · JPL
818939	2014 BO_{77}	—	January 28, 2014	Kitt Peak	Spacewatch	·	1.3 km	MPC · JPL
818940	2014 BR_{78}	—	January 29, 2014	Kitt Peak	Spacewatch	·	840 m	MPC · JPL
818941	2014 BA_{81}	—	January 28, 2014	Kitt Peak	Spacewatch	·	790 m	MPC · JPL
818942	2014 BE_{83}	—	January 28, 2014	Mount Lemmon	Mount Lemmon Survey	·	720 m	MPC · JPL
818943	2014 BW_{84}	—	January 23, 2014	Mount Lemmon	Mount Lemmon Survey	CLA	1.2 km	MPC · JPL
818944	2014 BQ_{85}	—	January 21, 2014	Mount Lemmon	Mount Lemmon Survey	V	400 m	MPC · JPL
818945	2014 BY_{87}	—	January 26, 2014	Haleakala	Pan-STARRS 1	H	420 m	MPC · JPL
818946	2014 BH_{94}	—	January 23, 2014	Kitt Peak	Spacewatch	·	690 m	MPC · JPL
818947	2014 CP_{1}	—	March 20, 2007	Kitt Peak	Spacewatch	NYS	640 m	MPC · JPL
818948	2014 CD_{5}	—	January 25, 2014	Haleakala	Pan-STARRS 1	·	1.1 km	MPC · JPL
818949	2014 CO_{5}	—	January 22, 2014	Kitt Peak	Spacewatch	EUN	860 m	MPC · JPL
818950	2014 CW_{6}	—	February 17, 2007	Kitt Peak	Spacewatch	·	690 m	MPC · JPL
818951	2014 CB_{10}	—	November 8, 2009	Kitt Peak	Spacewatch	·	850 m	MPC · JPL
818952	2014 CV_{12}	—	January 24, 2014	Haleakala	Pan-STARRS 1	·	680 m	MPC · JPL
818953	2014 CN_{14}	—	February 10, 2014	Haleakala	Pan-STARRS 1	H	410 m	MPC · JPL
818954	2014 CQ_{18}	—	February 17, 2007	Kitt Peak	Spacewatch	·	740 m	MPC · JPL
818955	2014 CD_{24}	—	February 9, 2014	Mount Lemmon	Mount Lemmon Survey	·	1.3 km	MPC · JPL
818956	2014 CL_{26}	—	February 17, 2010	Kitt Peak	Spacewatch	·	670 m	MPC · JPL
818957	2014 CD_{27}	—	February 10, 2014	Haleakala	Pan-STARRS 1	·	700 m	MPC · JPL
818958	2014 CY_{28}	—	February 6, 2014	Mount Lemmon	Mount Lemmon Survey	·	2.1 km	MPC · JPL
818959	2014 CT_{29}	—	November 8, 2009	Kitt Peak	Spacewatch	·	860 m	MPC · JPL
818960	2014 CZ_{30}	—	January 28, 2014	Mount Lemmon	Mount Lemmon Survey	·	660 m	MPC · JPL
818961	2014 CL_{32}	—	February 10, 2014	Haleakala	Pan-STARRS 1	·	1.8 km	MPC · JPL
818962	2014 CA_{33}	—	February 10, 2014	Mount Lemmon	Mount Lemmon Survey	·	1.0 km	MPC · JPL
818963	2014 CX_{37}	—	February 9, 2014	Mount Lemmon	Mount Lemmon Survey	MAS	550 m	MPC · JPL
818964	2014 CA_{39}	—	February 9, 2014	Mount Lemmon	Mount Lemmon Survey	·	700 m	MPC · JPL
818965	2014 DM	—	January 7, 2014	Mount Lemmon	Mount Lemmon Survey	H	440 m	MPC · JPL
818966	2014 DU	—	February 8, 2014	Kitt Peak	Spacewatch	HNS	1.0 km	MPC · JPL
818967	2014 DU_{2}	—	February 10, 2014	Haleakala	Pan-STARRS 1	H	430 m	MPC · JPL
818968	2014 DJ_{4}	—	November 17, 2009	Kitt Peak	Spacewatch	V	460 m	MPC · JPL
818969	2014 DJ_{8}	—	February 9, 2014	Haleakala	Pan-STARRS 1	PHO	670 m	MPC · JPL
818970	2014 DX_{9}	—	February 21, 2014	Kitt Peak	Spacewatch	H	410 m	MPC · JPL
818971	2014 DG_{11}	—	February 23, 2014	Haleakala	Pan-STARRS 1	H	370 m	MPC · JPL
818972	2014 DC_{18}	—	February 11, 2014	Mount Lemmon	Mount Lemmon Survey	H	480 m	MPC · JPL
818973	2014 DU_{21}	—	February 24, 2014	Haleakala	Pan-STARRS 1	H	360 m	MPC · JPL
818974	2014 DV_{21}	—	January 31, 2014	Haleakala	Pan-STARRS 1	H	440 m	MPC · JPL
818975	2014 DD_{22}	—	February 24, 2014	Haleakala	Pan-STARRS 1	H	390 m	MPC · JPL
818976	2014 DK_{22}	—	February 9, 2014	Haleakala	Pan-STARRS 1	·	430 m	MPC · JPL
818977	2014 DE_{29}	—	February 6, 2014	Mount Lemmon	Mount Lemmon Survey	·	1.0 km	MPC · JPL
818978	2014 DF_{29}	—	March 13, 2007	Kitt Peak	Spacewatch	·	820 m	MPC · JPL
818979	2014 DG_{39}	—	February 7, 2000	Kitt Peak	Spacewatch	·	660 m	MPC · JPL
818980	2014 DZ_{39}	—	November 20, 2004	Kitt Peak	Spacewatch	·	1.1 km	MPC · JPL
818981	2014 DY_{42}	—	January 29, 2014	Kitt Peak	Spacewatch	MAS	570 m	MPC · JPL
818982	2014 DZ_{46}	—	February 9, 2014	Mount Lemmon	Mount Lemmon Survey	·	1.0 km	MPC · JPL
818983	2014 DW_{47}	—	September 23, 2012	Mount Lemmon	Mount Lemmon Survey	·	1.2 km	MPC · JPL
818984	2014 DK_{48}	—	February 27, 2014	Kitt Peak	Spacewatch	·	1.0 km	MPC · JPL
818985	2014 DK_{49}	—	March 15, 2007	Kitt Peak	Spacewatch	NYS	640 m	MPC · JPL
818986	2014 DZ_{49}	—	October 21, 2012	Haleakala	Pan-STARRS 1	·	900 m	MPC · JPL
818987	2014 DZ_{54}	—	February 10, 2010	Kitt Peak	Spacewatch	MAS	620 m	MPC · JPL
818988	2014 DJ_{56}	—	February 26, 2014	Haleakala	Pan-STARRS 1	·	720 m	MPC · JPL
818989	2014 DN_{56}	—	February 26, 2014	Haleakala	Pan-STARRS 1	·	960 m	MPC · JPL
818990	2014 DG_{57}	—	April 15, 2007	Kitt Peak	Spacewatch	·	950 m	MPC · JPL
818991	2014 DK_{58}	—	February 26, 2014	Haleakala	Pan-STARRS 1	·	940 m	MPC · JPL
818992	2014 DK_{65}	—	February 26, 2014	Haleakala	Pan-STARRS 1	NYS	800 m	MPC · JPL
818993	2014 DN_{65}	—	February 26, 2014	Haleakala	Pan-STARRS 1	·	980 m	MPC · JPL
818994	2014 DO_{67}	—	November 12, 2012	Mount Lemmon	Mount Lemmon Survey	·	1.5 km	MPC · JPL
818995	2014 DZ_{71}	—	November 10, 2005	Mount Lemmon	Mount Lemmon Survey	·	860 m	MPC · JPL
818996	2014 DN_{75}	—	February 26, 2014	Haleakala	Pan-STARRS 1	·	860 m	MPC · JPL
818997	2014 DA_{78}	—	February 26, 2014	Haleakala	Pan-STARRS 1	·	740 m	MPC · JPL
818998	2014 DJ_{81}	—	February 11, 2014	Mount Lemmon	Mount Lemmon Survey	HNS	910 m	MPC · JPL
818999	2014 DU_{81}	—	April 22, 2007	Kitt Peak	Spacewatch	NYS	770 m	MPC · JPL
819000	2014 DE_{82}	—	February 22, 2014	Kitt Peak	Spacewatch	L4 · 006	7.5 km	MPC · JPL

back to top

== Meaning of names ==
As minor planet discoveries are confirmed, they are given a permanent number by the IAU's Minor Planet Center (MPC), and the discoverers can then submit names for them, following the IAU's naming conventions. The list below concerns those minor planets in the specified number-range that have received names, and explains the meanings of those names.

Official naming citations of newly named small Solar System bodies are approved and published in a bulletin by IAU's Working Group for Small Bodies Nomenclature (WGSBN). Before May 2021, citations were published in MPC's Minor Planet Circulars for many decades. Recent citations can also be found on the JPL Small-Body Database (SBDB). Until his death in 2016, German astronomer Lutz D. Schmadel compiled these citations into the Dictionary of Minor Planet Names (DMP) and regularly updated the collection.

Based on Paul Herget's The Names of the Minor Planets, Schmadel also researched the unclear origin of numerous asteroids, most of which had been named prior to World War II. This article incorporates text from this source, which is in the public domain: SBDB New namings may only be added to this list below after official publication as the preannouncement of names is condemned. The WGSBN publishes a comprehensive guideline for the naming rules of non-cometary small Solar System bodies.

Named minor planet	Provisional	This minor planet was named for...	Ref · Catalog
818660 Capar	2013 VP_{24}	Milena (b. 1984) and Kamil Capar (b. 1986), Polish amateur mineralogists and meteoriticists who are active popularizers of these fields.	IAU · 818660
