= List of minor planets: 860001–861000 =

The following is a partial list of minor planets, running from minor-planet number 860001 through 861000, inclusive. The primary data for this and other partial lists is based on JPL's "Small-Body Orbital Elements" and data available from the Minor Planet Center. Critical list information is also provided by the MPC, unless otherwise specified from Lowell Observatory. A detailed description of the table's columns and additional sources are given on the main page including a complete list of every page in this series, and a statistical break-up on the dynamical classification of minor planets.

Also see the summary list of all named bodies in numerical and alphabetical order, and the corresponding naming citations for the number range of this particular list. New namings may only be added to this list after official publication, as the preannouncement of names is condemned by the Working Group for Small Bodies Nomenclature of the International Astronomical Union.

Near-Earth obj.	MBA (inner)	MBA (outer)	Centaur
Mars-crosser	MBA (middle)	Jupiter trojan	Trans-Neptunian obj.
Unclassified

== 860001–860100 ==
Designation			Discovery			Properties		Ref
Permanent	Provisional	Named after	Date	Site	Discoverer(s)	Category	Diam.	Ref
860001	2013 TH_{234}	—	October 4, 2013	Mount Lemmon	Mount Lemmon Survey	·	1.0 km	MPC · JPL
860002	2013 TT_{234}	—	September 3, 2013	Calar Alto	F. Hormuth	·	850 m	MPC · JPL
860003	2013 TG_{236}	—	October 5, 2013	Haleakala	Pan-STARRS 1	·	790 m	MPC · JPL
860004	2013 TC_{238}	—	October 2, 2013	Mount Lemmon	Mount Lemmon Survey	·	490 m	MPC · JPL
860005	2013 TX_{241}	—	October 9, 2013	Mount Lemmon	Mount Lemmon Survey	AGN	820 m	MPC · JPL
860006	2013 TR_{242}	—	October 3, 2013	Haleakala	Pan-STARRS 1	·	1.2 km	MPC · JPL
860007	2013 TU_{242}	—	October 5, 2013	Haleakala	Pan-STARRS 1	AGN	810 m	MPC · JPL
860008	2013 TA_{243}	—	October 13, 2013	Mount Lemmon	Mount Lemmon Survey	·	1.3 km	MPC · JPL
860009	2013 TP_{248}	—	October 3, 2013	Kitt Peak	Spacewatch	·	1.2 km	MPC · JPL
860010	2013 TV_{249}	—	October 14, 2013	Kitt Peak	Spacewatch	EOS	1.2 km	MPC · JPL
860011	2013 TF_{250}	—	October 5, 2013	Haleakala	Pan-STARRS 1	·	470 m	MPC · JPL
860012	2013 TL_{250}	—	October 5, 2013	Haleakala	Pan-STARRS 1	·	1.1 km	MPC · JPL
860013	2013 TL_{251}	—	October 13, 2013	Mount Lemmon	Mount Lemmon Survey	·	440 m	MPC · JPL
860014	2013 TP_{282}	—	October 9, 2013	Mount Lemmon	Mount Lemmon Survey	·	2.1 km	MPC · JPL
860015	2013 TX_{284}	—	October 4, 2013	Mount Lemmon	Mount Lemmon Survey	·	570 m	MPC · JPL
860016	2013 TR_{285}	—	October 1, 2013	Mount Lemmon	Mount Lemmon Survey	L5	7.0 km	MPC · JPL
860017	2013 TF_{286}	—	October 5, 2013	Mount Lemmon	Mount Lemmon Survey	L5	6.8 km	MPC · JPL
860018	2013 UN_{2}	—	October 23, 2013	Haleakala	Pan-STARRS 1	H	380 m	MPC · JPL
860019	2013 UV_{10}	—	October 31, 2013	Mount Lemmon	Mount Lemmon Survey	AMO	400 m	MPC · JPL
860020	2013 UA_{15}	—	October 2, 2013	Mount Lemmon	Mount Lemmon Survey	·	940 m	MPC · JPL
860021	2013 UC_{16}	—	April 15, 2012	Haleakala	Pan-STARRS 1	H	330 m	MPC · JPL
860022	2013 UN_{16}	—	October 28, 2013	Mount Lemmon	Mount Lemmon Survey	·	1.4 km	MPC · JPL
860023	2013 UA_{20}	—	October 24, 2013	Mount Lemmon	Mount Lemmon Survey	·	1.8 km	MPC · JPL
860024	2013 UN_{22}	—	October 26, 2013	Mount Lemmon	Mount Lemmon Survey	·	480 m	MPC · JPL
860025	2013 UZ_{22}	—	October 26, 2013	Mount Lemmon	Mount Lemmon Survey	·	1.2 km	MPC · JPL
860026	2013 UX_{24}	—	October 31, 2013	Piszkéstető	K. Sárneczky	·	820 m	MPC · JPL
860027	2013 UA_{25}	—	October 25, 2013	Mount Lemmon	Mount Lemmon Survey	NYS	670 m	MPC · JPL
860028	2013 UU_{25}	—	October 24, 2013	Mount Lemmon	Mount Lemmon Survey	MAS	470 m	MPC · JPL
860029	2013 UX_{25}	—	October 28, 2013	Kitt Peak	Spacewatch	·	1.0 km	MPC · JPL
860030	2013 UG_{26}	—	October 30, 2013	Kitt Peak	Spacewatch	(5)	1.0 km	MPC · JPL
860031	2013 UL_{26}	—	October 26, 2013	Mount Lemmon	Mount Lemmon Survey	·	710 m	MPC · JPL
860032	2013 UV_{27}	—	October 17, 2013	Mount Lemmon	Mount Lemmon Survey	·	750 m	MPC · JPL
860033	2013 UH_{29}	—	October 25, 2013	Haleakala	Pan-STARRS 1	TIR	2.2 km	MPC · JPL
860034	2013 UA_{31}	—	September 9, 2007	Kitt Peak	Spacewatch	·	2.3 km	MPC · JPL
860035	2013 UY_{31}	—	October 16, 2013	Mount Lemmon	Mount Lemmon Survey	·	2.1 km	MPC · JPL
860036	2013 UW_{32}	—	October 28, 2013	Kitt Peak	Spacewatch	EUN	860 m	MPC · JPL
860037	2013 UX_{34}	—	October 28, 2013	Mount Lemmon	Mount Lemmon Survey	·	2.4 km	MPC · JPL
860038	2013 UA_{35}	—	October 24, 2013	Mount Lemmon	Mount Lemmon Survey	·	2.4 km	MPC · JPL
860039	2013 UJ_{35}	—	October 28, 2013	Kitt Peak	Spacewatch	·	1.3 km	MPC · JPL
860040	2013 UP_{35}	—	October 25, 2013	Palomar	Palomar Transient Factory	·	1.9 km	MPC · JPL
860041	2013 US_{35}	—	October 23, 2013	Mount Lemmon	Mount Lemmon Survey	·	2.2 km	MPC · JPL
860042	2013 UO_{36}	—	October 26, 2013	Mount Lemmon	Mount Lemmon Survey	L5	7.9 km	MPC · JPL
860043	2013 UC_{37}	—	October 24, 2013	Mount Lemmon	Mount Lemmon Survey	L5	7.1 km	MPC · JPL
860044	2013 UG_{37}	—	October 26, 2013	Kitt Peak	Spacewatch	·	640 m	MPC · JPL
860045	2013 UE_{38}	—	October 30, 2013	Haleakala	Pan-STARRS 1	·	760 m	MPC · JPL
860046	2013 UH_{38}	—	October 26, 2013	Kitt Peak	Spacewatch	MAS	520 m	MPC · JPL
860047	2013 US_{38}	—	April 14, 2008	Mount Lemmon	Mount Lemmon Survey	·	770 m	MPC · JPL
860048	2013 UX_{39}	—	October 28, 2013	Mount Lemmon	Mount Lemmon Survey	·	660 m	MPC · JPL
860049	2013 UB_{42}	—	October 26, 2013	Kitt Peak	Spacewatch	NYS	690 m	MPC · JPL
860050	2013 UL_{42}	—	October 25, 2013	Kitt Peak	Spacewatch	L5	7.3 km	MPC · JPL
860051	2013 UH_{44}	—	October 24, 2013	Haleakala	Pan-STARRS 1	L5	6.5 km	MPC · JPL
860052	2013 UX_{44}	—	October 24, 2013	Mount Lemmon	Mount Lemmon Survey	·	1.5 km	MPC · JPL
860053	2013 UX_{45}	—	January 10, 2007	Kitt Peak	Spacewatch	·	720 m	MPC · JPL
860054	2013 UD_{49}	—	October 31, 2013	Mount Lemmon	Mount Lemmon Survey	L5 · (291316)	6.1 km	MPC · JPL
860055	2013 UD_{50}	—	October 23, 2013	Mount Lemmon	Mount Lemmon Survey	·	650 m	MPC · JPL
860056	2013 UF_{51}	—	October 26, 2013	Mount Lemmon	Mount Lemmon Survey	ANF	1.2 km	MPC · JPL
860057	2013 UV_{52}	—	October 22, 2013	Mount Lemmon	Mount Lemmon Survey	LIX	2.4 km	MPC · JPL
860058	2013 UG_{53}	—	October 24, 2013	Mount Lemmon	Mount Lemmon Survey	·	1.4 km	MPC · JPL
860059	2013 UT_{53}	—	October 25, 2013	Mount Lemmon	Mount Lemmon Survey	·	1.4 km	MPC · JPL
860060	2013 UK_{66}	—	February 10, 2008	Kitt Peak	Spacewatch	·	520 m	MPC · JPL
860061	2013 VE	—	November 1, 2013	Mount Lemmon	Mount Lemmon Survey	H	290 m	MPC · JPL
860062	2013 VV	—	October 6, 2013	Mount Lemmon	Mount Lemmon Survey	·	1.2 km	MPC · JPL
860063	2013 VT_{1}	—	October 17, 2013	Mount Lemmon	Mount Lemmon Survey	·	900 m	MPC · JPL
860064	2013 VW_{3}	—	October 13, 2013	Catalina	CSS	EUP	3.0 km	MPC · JPL
860065	2013 VS_{5}	—	July 19, 2013	Haleakala	Pan-STARRS 1	·	1.6 km	MPC · JPL
860066	2013 VL_{9}	—	November 6, 2013	Haleakala	Pan-STARRS 1	H	490 m	MPC · JPL
860067	2013 VU_{9}	—	November 6, 2013	Mount Lemmon	Mount Lemmon Survey	·	360 m	MPC · JPL
860068	2013 VW_{12}	—	November 10, 2013	Mount Lemmon	Mount Lemmon Survey	H	400 m	MPC · JPL
860069	2013 VK_{17}	—	July 14, 2013	Haleakala	Pan-STARRS 1	·	2.1 km	MPC · JPL
860070	2013 VK_{29}	—	August 13, 2007	Anderson Mesa	LONEOS	·	1.9 km	MPC · JPL
860071	2013 VM_{29}	—	November 25, 2009	Kitt Peak	Spacewatch	·	840 m	MPC · JPL
860072	2013 VG_{32}	—	November 2, 2013	Kitt Peak	Spacewatch	·	900 m	MPC · JPL
860073	2013 VB_{33}	—	November 12, 2013	Mount Lemmon	Mount Lemmon Survey	(5)	850 m	MPC · JPL
860074	2013 VF_{33}	—	November 6, 2013	Haleakala	Pan-STARRS 1	·	950 m	MPC · JPL
860075	2013 VK_{33}	—	November 4, 2013	Haleakala	Pan-STARRS 1	·	870 m	MPC · JPL
860076	2013 VZ_{33}	—	November 14, 2013	Mount Lemmon	Mount Lemmon Survey	·	890 m	MPC · JPL
860077	2013 VW_{34}	—	January 18, 2015	Haleakala	Pan-STARRS 1	·	2.2 km	MPC · JPL
860078	2013 VG_{35}	—	November 9, 2013	Haleakala	Pan-STARRS 1	·	800 m	MPC · JPL
860079	2013 VH_{35}	—	January 25, 2015	Haleakala	Pan-STARRS 1	MAR	930 m	MPC · JPL
860080	2013 VJ_{35}	—	November 9, 2013	Haleakala	Pan-STARRS 1	(5)	840 m	MPC · JPL
860081	2013 VS_{36}	—	November 9, 2013	Mount Lemmon	Mount Lemmon Survey	·	700 m	MPC · JPL
860082	2013 VH_{37}	—	November 1, 2013	Mount Lemmon	Mount Lemmon Survey	EUN	730 m	MPC · JPL
860083	2013 VN_{38}	—	January 22, 2015	Haleakala	Pan-STARRS 1	·	1.2 km	MPC · JPL
860084	2013 VT_{38}	—	January 19, 2015	Haleakala	Pan-STARRS 1	·	2.7 km	MPC · JPL
860085	2013 VX_{38}	—	November 1, 2013	Kitt Peak	Spacewatch	EUN	800 m	MPC · JPL
860086	2013 VP_{41}	—	November 11, 2013	Kitt Peak	Spacewatch	·	2.9 km	MPC · JPL
860087	2013 VV_{42}	—	November 1, 2013	Mount Lemmon	Mount Lemmon Survey	·	590 m	MPC · JPL
860088	2013 VJ_{43}	—	November 1, 2013	Kitt Peak	Spacewatch	LIX	2.8 km	MPC · JPL
860089	2013 VL_{43}	—	October 13, 2017	Mount Lemmon	Mount Lemmon Survey	MAR	710 m	MPC · JPL
860090	2013 VN_{43}	—	November 2, 2013	Mount Lemmon	Mount Lemmon Survey	EUN	790 m	MPC · JPL
860091	2013 VD_{44}	—	October 27, 2017	Haleakala	Pan-STARRS 1	·	1.1 km	MPC · JPL
860092	2013 VE_{44}	—	November 9, 2013	Mount Lemmon	Mount Lemmon Survey	·	2.0 km	MPC · JPL
860093	2013 VU_{47}	—	November 4, 2013	Haleakala	Pan-STARRS 1	TIR	1.9 km	MPC · JPL
860094	2013 VF_{48}	—	October 1, 2013	Mount Lemmon	Mount Lemmon Survey	·	2.4 km	MPC · JPL
860095	2013 VD_{50}	—	November 11, 2013	Kitt Peak	Spacewatch	·	2.7 km	MPC · JPL
860096	2013 VC_{52}	—	November 9, 2013	Haleakala	Pan-STARRS 1	L5	6.8 km	MPC · JPL
860097	2013 VO_{52}	—	November 10, 2013	Mount Lemmon	Mount Lemmon Survey	·	1.6 km	MPC · JPL
860098	2013 VF_{53}	—	November 9, 2013	Mount Lemmon	Mount Lemmon Survey	·	1.9 km	MPC · JPL
860099	2013 VT_{53}	—	November 4, 2013	XuYi	PMO NEO Survey Program	·	2.6 km	MPC · JPL
860100	2013 VO_{54}	—	November 9, 2013	Mount Lemmon	Mount Lemmon Survey	·	770 m	MPC · JPL

== 860101–860200 ==
back to top

Designation			Discovery			Properties		Ref
Permanent	Provisional	Named after	Date	Site	Discoverer(s)	Category	Diam.	Ref
860101	2013 VU_{54}	—	November 10, 2013	Mount Lemmon	Mount Lemmon Survey	·	1.8 km	MPC · JPL
860102	2013 VJ_{55}	—	November 1, 2013	Mount Lemmon	Mount Lemmon Survey	·	790 m	MPC · JPL
860103	2013 VA_{56}	—	November 8, 2013	Mount Lemmon	Mount Lemmon Survey	·	840 m	MPC · JPL
860104	2013 VN_{56}	—	November 4, 2013	Haleakala	Pan-STARRS 1	·	2.1 km	MPC · JPL
860105	2013 VB_{57}	—	November 9, 2013	Mount Lemmon	Mount Lemmon Survey	MAS	420 m	MPC · JPL
860106	2013 VL_{59}	—	November 1, 2013	Mount Lemmon	Mount Lemmon Survey	·	760 m	MPC · JPL
860107	2013 VS_{59}	—	November 2, 2013	Mount Lemmon	Mount Lemmon Survey	MAS	480 m	MPC · JPL
860108	2013 VU_{59}	—	November 10, 2013	Mount Lemmon	Mount Lemmon Survey	·	810 m	MPC · JPL
860109	2013 VG_{60}	—	November 9, 2013	Mount Lemmon	Mount Lemmon Survey	L5	7.0 km	MPC · JPL
860110	2013 VZ_{60}	—	November 9, 2013	Haleakala	Pan-STARRS 1	·	680 m	MPC · JPL
860111	2013 VC_{62}	—	November 4, 2013	Mount Lemmon	Mount Lemmon Survey	·	1.3 km	MPC · JPL
860112	2013 VM_{62}	—	November 10, 2013	Kitt Peak	Spacewatch	·	590 m	MPC · JPL
860113	2013 VY_{63}	—	November 9, 2013	Haleakala	Pan-STARRS 1	·	840 m	MPC · JPL
860114	2013 VT_{64}	—	November 12, 2013	Mount Lemmon	Mount Lemmon Survey	L5	6.9 km	MPC · JPL
860115	2013 VU_{65}	—	November 6, 2013	Kitt Peak	Spacewatch	NYS	690 m	MPC · JPL
860116	2013 VW_{65}	—	November 8, 2013	Mount Lemmon	Mount Lemmon Survey	L5	6.0 km	MPC · JPL
860117	2013 VA_{66}	—	November 9, 2013	Haleakala	Pan-STARRS 1	THM	1.5 km	MPC · JPL
860118	2013 VM_{66}	—	November 9, 2013	Haleakala	Pan-STARRS 1	·	1.1 km	MPC · JPL
860119	2013 VT_{66}	—	November 1, 2013	Mount Lemmon	Mount Lemmon Survey	·	920 m	MPC · JPL
860120	2013 VH_{67}	—	November 1, 2013	Mount Lemmon	Mount Lemmon Survey	·	1.7 km	MPC · JPL
860121	2013 VL_{67}	—	November 10, 2013	Mount Lemmon	Mount Lemmon Survey	·	2.1 km	MPC · JPL
860122	2013 VW_{68}	—	November 1, 2013	Mount Lemmon	Mount Lemmon Survey	·	1.4 km	MPC · JPL
860123	2013 VC_{70}	—	November 9, 2013	Haleakala	Pan-STARRS 1	·	1.6 km	MPC · JPL
860124	2013 VM_{70}	—	November 10, 2013	Kitt Peak	Spacewatch	·	760 m	MPC · JPL
860125	2013 VA_{71}	—	November 2, 2013	Mount Lemmon	Mount Lemmon Survey	·	900 m	MPC · JPL
860126	2013 VQ_{72}	—	November 4, 2013	Mount Lemmon	Mount Lemmon Survey	HYG	1.9 km	MPC · JPL
860127	2013 VK_{73}	—	November 1, 2013	Mount Lemmon	Mount Lemmon Survey	·	790 m	MPC · JPL
860128	2013 VR_{75}	—	November 9, 2013	Haleakala	Pan-STARRS 1	·	2.5 km	MPC · JPL
860129	2013 VN_{78}	—	November 6, 2013	Haleakala	Pan-STARRS 1	MAR	770 m	MPC · JPL
860130	2013 VU_{79}	—	October 30, 2013	Haleakala	Pan-STARRS 1	EOS	1.4 km	MPC · JPL
860131	2013 VO_{80}	—	November 9, 2013	Haleakala	Pan-STARRS 1	·	1.3 km	MPC · JPL
860132	2013 VE_{81}	—	November 2, 2013	Kitt Peak	Spacewatch	·	1.3 km	MPC · JPL
860133	2013 VY_{85}	—	November 1, 2013	Mount Lemmon	Mount Lemmon Survey	L5	6.6 km	MPC · JPL
860134	2013 VZ_{85}	—	November 9, 2013	Haleakala	Pan-STARRS 1	·	1.9 km	MPC · JPL
860135	2013 VT_{87}	—	November 7, 2013	Kitt Peak	Spacewatch	·	1.4 km	MPC · JPL
860136	2013 VK_{89}	—	November 10, 2013	Mount Lemmon	Mount Lemmon Survey	·	490 m	MPC · JPL
860137	2013 VG_{90}	—	November 4, 2013	Haleakala	Pan-STARRS 1	·	2.0 km	MPC · JPL
860138	2013 VJ_{91}	—	November 10, 2013	Mount Lemmon	Mount Lemmon Survey	·	2.5 km	MPC · JPL
860139	2013 VT_{92}	—	November 9, 2013	Mount Lemmon	Mount Lemmon Survey	L5	5.9 km	MPC · JPL
860140	2013 VP_{93}	—	November 9, 2013	Mount Lemmon	Mount Lemmon Survey	L5	6.3 km	MPC · JPL
860141	2013 VU_{96}	—	November 9, 2013	Mount Lemmon	Mount Lemmon Survey	·	450 m	MPC · JPL
860142	2013 WR_{13}	—	November 27, 2013	Haleakala	Pan-STARRS 1	·	1.4 km	MPC · JPL
860143	2013 WS_{13}	—	November 27, 2013	Haleakala	Pan-STARRS 1	·	540 m	MPC · JPL
860144	2013 WD_{18}	—	November 27, 2013	Haleakala	Pan-STARRS 1	·	980 m	MPC · JPL
860145	2013 WY_{18}	—	November 27, 2013	Haleakala	Pan-STARRS 1	KON	1.4 km	MPC · JPL
860146	2013 WP_{22}	—	November 6, 2013	Haleakala	Pan-STARRS 1	·	1.3 km	MPC · JPL
860147	2013 WB_{23}	—	November 6, 2013	Haleakala	Pan-STARRS 1	·	930 m	MPC · JPL
860148	2013 WS_{23}	—	November 27, 2013	Haleakala	Pan-STARRS 1	·	1.3 km	MPC · JPL
860149	2013 WM_{26}	—	November 9, 2013	Mount Lemmon	Mount Lemmon Survey	·	1.3 km	MPC · JPL
860150	2013 WZ_{27}	—	November 10, 2013	Kitt Peak	Spacewatch	·	1.4 km	MPC · JPL
860151	2013 WD_{31}	—	November 26, 2013	Haleakala	Pan-STARRS 1	·	2.3 km	MPC · JPL
860152	2013 WK_{34}	—	November 26, 2013	Haleakala	Pan-STARRS 1	EUN	870 m	MPC · JPL
860153	2013 WN_{38}	—	November 28, 2013	Kitt Peak	Spacewatch	·	2.1 km	MPC · JPL
860154	2013 WS_{38}	—	October 9, 2013	Mount Lemmon	Mount Lemmon Survey	·	2.3 km	MPC · JPL
860155	2013 WB_{41}	—	November 28, 2013	Mount Lemmon	Mount Lemmon Survey	·	2.1 km	MPC · JPL
860156	2013 WE_{41}	—	November 28, 2013	Mount Lemmon	Mount Lemmon Survey	·	1.3 km	MPC · JPL
860157	2013 WR_{42}	—	November 28, 2013	Mount Lemmon	Mount Lemmon Survey	MAR	740 m	MPC · JPL
860158	2013 WN_{43}	—	November 28, 2013	Mount Lemmon	Mount Lemmon Survey	·	640 m	MPC · JPL
860159	2013 WE_{45}	—	November 27, 2013	Haleakala	Pan-STARRS 1	H	370 m	MPC · JPL
860160	2013 WB_{50}	—	November 25, 2013	Haleakala	Pan-STARRS 1	BRG	820 m	MPC · JPL
860161	2013 WH_{50}	—	November 17, 2006	Kitt Peak	Spacewatch	·	760 m	MPC · JPL
860162	2013 WQ_{52}	—	November 25, 2013	Haleakala	Pan-STARRS 1	·	720 m	MPC · JPL
860163	2013 WW_{52}	—	November 25, 2013	Haleakala	Pan-STARRS 1	·	750 m	MPC · JPL
860164	2013 WR_{59}	—	October 26, 2013	Mount Lemmon	Mount Lemmon Survey	TIR	2.0 km	MPC · JPL
860165	2013 WE_{62}	—	November 28, 2013	Mount Lemmon	Mount Lemmon Survey	·	820 m	MPC · JPL
860166	2013 WF_{62}	—	November 28, 2013	Mount Lemmon	Mount Lemmon Survey	·	1.4 km	MPC · JPL
860167	2013 WS_{65}	—	November 10, 2013	Mount Lemmon	Mount Lemmon Survey	·	1.6 km	MPC · JPL
860168	2013 WG_{66}	—	October 3, 2013	Mount Lemmon	Mount Lemmon Survey	EUN	900 m	MPC · JPL
860169	2013 WL_{66}	—	October 6, 2013	Kitt Peak	Spacewatch	·	870 m	MPC · JPL
860170	2013 WA_{67}	—	November 10, 2013	Kitt Peak	Spacewatch	·	1.8 km	MPC · JPL
860171	2013 WQ_{71}	—	November 2, 2013	Mount Lemmon	Mount Lemmon Survey	·	1.9 km	MPC · JPL
860172	2013 WA_{75}	—	November 26, 2013	Haleakala	Pan-STARRS 1	·	990 m	MPC · JPL
860173	2013 WG_{76}	—	November 8, 2013	Mount Lemmon	Mount Lemmon Survey	JUN	800 m	MPC · JPL
860174	2013 WD_{78}	—	October 8, 2007	Mount Lemmon	Mount Lemmon Survey	·	1.7 km	MPC · JPL
860175	2013 WK_{78}	—	September 22, 2009	Mount Lemmon	Mount Lemmon Survey	·	760 m	MPC · JPL
860176	2013 WK_{82}	—	October 24, 2013	Kitt Peak	Spacewatch	·	450 m	MPC · JPL
860177	2013 WC_{86}	—	November 27, 2013	Haleakala	Pan-STARRS 1	·	820 m	MPC · JPL
860178	2013 WK_{87}	—	November 27, 2013	Haleakala	Pan-STARRS 1	·	610 m	MPC · JPL
860179	2013 WF_{88}	—	November 6, 2013	Haleakala	Pan-STARRS 1	PHO	880 m	MPC · JPL
860180	2013 WQ_{88}	—	November 28, 2013	Mount Lemmon	Mount Lemmon Survey	·	950 m	MPC · JPL
860181	2013 WC_{92}	—	November 28, 2013	Mount Lemmon	Mount Lemmon Survey	·	590 m	MPC · JPL
860182	2013 WG_{92}	—	November 28, 2013	Mount Lemmon	Mount Lemmon Survey	·	750 m	MPC · JPL
860183	2013 WQ_{92}	—	November 28, 2013	Mount Lemmon	Mount Lemmon Survey	V	430 m	MPC · JPL
860184	2013 WY_{96}	—	November 28, 2013	Mount Lemmon	Mount Lemmon Survey	EOS	1.2 km	MPC · JPL
860185	2013 WH_{99}	—	November 29, 2013	Haleakala	Pan-STARRS 1	TIR	1.7 km	MPC · JPL
860186	2013 WD_{107}	—	November 29, 2013	Haleakala	Pan-STARRS 1	H	440 m	MPC · JPL
860187	2013 WJ_{107}	—	November 28, 2013	Mount Lemmon	Mount Lemmon Survey	·	640 m	MPC · JPL
860188	2013 WA_{108}	—	November 29, 2013	Haleakala	Pan-STARRS 1	H	360 m	MPC · JPL
860189	2013 WA_{109}	—	October 5, 2013	Haleakala	Pan-STARRS 1	·	1.3 km	MPC · JPL
860190	2013 WF_{110}	—	January 9, 2015	Haleakala	Pan-STARRS 1	L5	5.2 km	MPC · JPL
860191	2013 WR_{110}	—	November 28, 2013	Mount Lemmon	Mount Lemmon Survey	·	1.6 km	MPC · JPL
860192	2013 WS_{112}	—	October 31, 2013	Mount Lemmon	Mount Lemmon Survey	EUN	950 m	MPC · JPL
860193	2013 WV_{112}	—	December 21, 2008	Kitt Peak	Spacewatch	·	1.5 km	MPC · JPL
860194	2013 WY_{115}	—	September 10, 1996	La Silla	Uppsala-DLR Trojan Survey	·	760 m	MPC · JPL
860195	2013 WA_{116}	—	November 27, 2013	Haleakala	Pan-STARRS 1	·	830 m	MPC · JPL
860196	2013 WE_{116}	—	November 27, 2013	Haleakala	Pan-STARRS 1	·	920 m	MPC · JPL
860197	2013 WO_{116}	—	November 28, 2013	Haleakala	Pan-STARRS 1	(5)	980 m	MPC · JPL
860198	2013 WN_{117}	—	November 29, 2013	Mount Lemmon	Mount Lemmon Survey	(5)	730 m	MPC · JPL
860199	2013 WY_{117}	—	November 27, 2013	Haleakala	Pan-STARRS 1	·	970 m	MPC · JPL
860200	2013 WH_{118}	—	November 28, 2013	Mount Lemmon	Mount Lemmon Survey	·	1.2 km	MPC · JPL

== 860201–860300 ==
back to top

Designation			Discovery			Properties		Ref
Permanent	Provisional	Named after	Date	Site	Discoverer(s)	Category	Diam.	Ref
860201	2013 WJ_{120}	—	June 10, 2018	Haleakala	Pan-STARRS 1	·	2.8 km	MPC · JPL
860202	2013 WB_{121}	—	November 28, 2013	Mount Lemmon	Mount Lemmon Survey	·	1.1 km	MPC · JPL
860203	2013 WR_{121}	—	October 26, 2013	Mount Lemmon	Mount Lemmon Survey	·	1.1 km	MPC · JPL
860204	2013 WM_{122}	—	November 29, 2013	Haleakala	Pan-STARRS 1	·	1 km	MPC · JPL
860205	2013 WT_{122}	—	November 25, 2013	Haleakala	Pan-STARRS 1	KON	1.7 km	MPC · JPL
860206	2013 WL_{123}	—	November 27, 2013	Haleakala	Pan-STARRS 1	EUN	690 m	MPC · JPL
860207	2013 WV_{123}	—	June 15, 2018	Haleakala	Pan-STARRS 1	·	2.1 km	MPC · JPL
860208	2013 WW_{123}	—	March 19, 2015	Haleakala	Pan-STARRS 1	·	810 m	MPC · JPL
860209	2013 WM_{124}	—	November 29, 2013	Mount Lemmon	Mount Lemmon Survey	·	620 m	MPC · JPL
860210	2013 WZ_{125}	—	November 28, 2013	Mount Lemmon	Mount Lemmon Survey	·	2.0 km	MPC · JPL
860211	2013 WM_{129}	—	November 28, 2013	Mount Lemmon	Mount Lemmon Survey	HNS	870 m	MPC · JPL
860212	2013 WU_{129}	—	November 28, 2013	Mount Lemmon	Mount Lemmon Survey	·	1.6 km	MPC · JPL
860213	2013 WZ_{129}	—	November 28, 2013	Mount Lemmon	Mount Lemmon Survey	·	1.4 km	MPC · JPL
860214	2013 WG_{130}	—	November 28, 2013	Mount Lemmon	Mount Lemmon Survey	·	800 m	MPC · JPL
860215	2013 WV_{130}	—	November 26, 2013	Mount Lemmon	Mount Lemmon Survey	·	810 m	MPC · JPL
860216	2013 WX_{130}	—	November 27, 2013	Haleakala	Pan-STARRS 1	EOS	1.2 km	MPC · JPL
860217	2013 WT_{131}	—	November 27, 2013	Haleakala	Pan-STARRS 1	V	330 m	MPC · JPL
860218	2013 WB_{132}	—	November 28, 2013	Mount Lemmon	Mount Lemmon Survey	EUN	630 m	MPC · JPL
860219	2013 WK_{132}	—	November 27, 2013	Haleakala	Pan-STARRS 1	EOS	1.4 km	MPC · JPL
860220	2013 WL_{132}	—	November 27, 2013	Haleakala	Pan-STARRS 1	·	620 m	MPC · JPL
860221	2013 WS_{132}	—	November 26, 2013	Mount Lemmon	Mount Lemmon Survey	·	730 m	MPC · JPL
860222	2013 WU_{132}	—	November 27, 2013	Haleakala	Pan-STARRS 1	·	860 m	MPC · JPL
860223	2013 WH_{134}	—	November 28, 2013	Kitt Peak	Spacewatch	·	710 m	MPC · JPL
860224	2013 WK_{136}	—	November 26, 2013	Mount Lemmon	Mount Lemmon Survey	·	1.6 km	MPC · JPL
860225	2013 WU_{136}	—	November 27, 2013	Haleakala	Pan-STARRS 1	·	1.5 km	MPC · JPL
860226	2013 WS_{137}	—	November 26, 2013	Haleakala	Pan-STARRS 1	(5)	560 m	MPC · JPL
860227	2013 WM_{138}	—	November 27, 2013	Haleakala	Pan-STARRS 1	·	1.1 km	MPC · JPL
860228	2013 WX_{138}	—	November 27, 2013	Haleakala	Pan-STARRS 1	·	940 m	MPC · JPL
860229	2013 WQ_{139}	—	November 28, 2013	Mount Lemmon	Mount Lemmon Survey	·	730 m	MPC · JPL
860230	2013 WA_{140}	—	November 28, 2013	Mount Lemmon	Mount Lemmon Survey	·	990 m	MPC · JPL
860231	2013 WK_{143}	—	November 26, 2013	Haleakala	Pan-STARRS 1	·	1.3 km	MPC · JPL
860232	2013 WE_{145}	—	November 28, 2013	Mount Lemmon	Mount Lemmon Survey	L5	8.2 km	MPC · JPL
860233	2013 WS_{146}	—	November 29, 2013	Haleakala	Pan-STARRS 1	·	2.7 km	MPC · JPL
860234	2013 WW_{146}	—	June 13, 2015	Haleakala	Pan-STARRS 1	·	760 m	MPC · JPL
860235	2013 WJ_{147}	—	November 28, 2013	Haleakala	Pan-STARRS 1	·	500 m	MPC · JPL
860236	2013 WR_{148}	—	November 28, 2013	Mount Lemmon	Mount Lemmon Survey	·	1.9 km	MPC · JPL
860237	2013 XK_{5}	—	December 3, 2013	Haleakala	Pan-STARRS 1	·	3.2 km	MPC · JPL
860238	2013 XU_{14}	—	November 27, 2013	Haleakala	Pan-STARRS 1	·	1.5 km	MPC · JPL
860239	2013 XY_{14}	—	December 7, 2013	Mount Lemmon	Mount Lemmon Survey	MAS	480 m	MPC · JPL
860240	2013 XA_{16}	—	November 28, 2013	Mount Lemmon	Mount Lemmon Survey	·	570 m	MPC · JPL
860241	2013 XT_{16}	—	December 10, 2013	Mount Lemmon	Mount Lemmon Survey	·	1.3 km	MPC · JPL
860242	2013 XD_{17}	—	December 10, 2013	Mount Lemmon	Mount Lemmon Survey	·	1.9 km	MPC · JPL
860243	2013 XY_{18}	—	December 10, 2013	Haleakala	Pan-STARRS 1	·	410 m	MPC · JPL
860244	2013 XV_{19}	—	December 11, 2013	Nogales	M. Schwartz, P. R. Holvorcem	·	1.4 km	MPC · JPL
860245	2013 XE_{26}	—	December 1, 2014	Kitt Peak	Spacewatch	L5	7.3 km	MPC · JPL
860246	2013 XB_{28}	—	December 1, 2013	Črni Vrh	Vales, J.	·	1.3 km	MPC · JPL
860247	2013 XW_{28}	—	December 4, 2013	XuYi	PMO NEO Survey Program	·	1.3 km	MPC · JPL
860248	2013 XY_{28}	—	December 12, 2013	Haleakala	Pan-STARRS 1	·	1.1 km	MPC · JPL
860249	2013 XL_{30}	—	December 11, 2013	Haleakala	Pan-STARRS 1	·	1.2 km	MPC · JPL
860250	2013 XL_{31}	—	December 3, 2013	Haleakala	Pan-STARRS 1	KON	1.4 km	MPC · JPL
860251	2013 XY_{31}	—	December 7, 2013	Mount Lemmon	Mount Lemmon Survey	EUP	2.7 km	MPC · JPL
860252	2013 XV_{32}	—	March 25, 2015	Haleakala	Pan-STARRS 1	·	950 m	MPC · JPL
860253	2013 XW_{32}	—	December 14, 2013	Mount Lemmon	Mount Lemmon Survey	·	800 m	MPC · JPL
860254	2013 XL_{33}	—	December 11, 2013	Haleakala	Pan-STARRS 1	·	1.2 km	MPC · JPL
860255	2013 XM_{34}	—	February 23, 2015	Haleakala	Pan-STARRS 1	·	1.1 km	MPC · JPL
860256	2013 XU_{34}	—	December 11, 2013	Haleakala	Pan-STARRS 1	·	1.0 km	MPC · JPL
860257	2013 XZ_{34}	—	December 13, 2013	Mount Lemmon	Mount Lemmon Survey	·	2.8 km	MPC · JPL
860258	2013 XV_{37}	—	December 11, 2013	Haleakala	Pan-STARRS 1	NYS	590 m	MPC · JPL
860259	2013 XZ_{38}	—	December 11, 2013	Haleakala	Pan-STARRS 1	·	2.2 km	MPC · JPL
860260	2013 XS_{39}	—	December 3, 2013	Haleakala	Pan-STARRS 1	·	1.3 km	MPC · JPL
860261	2013 XJ_{40}	—	December 4, 2013	Haleakala	Pan-STARRS 1	·	880 m	MPC · JPL
860262	2013 XV_{40}	—	December 10, 2013	Mount Lemmon	Mount Lemmon Survey	·	830 m	MPC · JPL
860263	2013 XH_{41}	—	December 11, 2013	Haleakala	Pan-STARRS 1	·	750 m	MPC · JPL
860264	2013 XV_{41}	—	December 4, 2013	Haleakala	Pan-STARRS 1	ADE	1.1 km	MPC · JPL
860265	2013 XC_{42}	—	December 4, 2013	Haleakala	Pan-STARRS 1	·	620 m	MPC · JPL
860266	2013 YP	—	December 11, 2013	Mount Lemmon	Mount Lemmon Survey	H	530 m	MPC · JPL
860267	2013 YW_{2}	—	November 27, 2013	Haleakala	Pan-STARRS 1	H	440 m	MPC · JPL
860268	2013 YE_{3}	—	May 2, 2006	Catalina	CSS	·	1.1 km	MPC · JPL
860269	2013 YC_{6}	—	June 21, 2007	Mount Lemmon	Mount Lemmon Survey	H	450 m	MPC · JPL
860270	2013 YO_{6}	—	November 28, 2013	Mount Lemmon	Mount Lemmon Survey	H	340 m	MPC · JPL
860271	2013 YK_{9}	—	December 24, 2013	Mount Lemmon	Mount Lemmon Survey	·	960 m	MPC · JPL
860272	2013 YM_{14}	—	December 3, 2013	Oukaïmeden	M. Ory	·	1.2 km	MPC · JPL
860273	2013 YR_{14}	—	December 23, 2013	Mount Lemmon	Mount Lemmon Survey	·	1.2 km	MPC · JPL
860274	2013 YT_{16}	—	December 24, 2013	Mount Lemmon	Mount Lemmon Survey	NYS	920 m	MPC · JPL
860275	2013 YG_{21}	—	April 26, 2006	Kitt Peak	Spacewatch	·	1.3 km	MPC · JPL
860276	2013 YA_{23}	—	September 23, 2009	Mount Lemmon	Mount Lemmon Survey	·	870 m	MPC · JPL
860277	2013 YG_{25}	—	November 28, 2013	Mount Lemmon	Mount Lemmon Survey	·	810 m	MPC · JPL
860278	2013 YW_{31}	—	December 25, 2013	Mount Lemmon	Mount Lemmon Survey	JUN	860 m	MPC · JPL
860279	2013 YY_{31}	—	December 11, 2013	Mount Lemmon	Mount Lemmon Survey	·	2.3 km	MPC · JPL
860280	2013 YH_{33}	—	February 15, 2010	Kitt Peak	Spacewatch	·	980 m	MPC · JPL
860281	2013 YQ_{33}	—	February 17, 2010	Kitt Peak	Spacewatch	·	1.1 km	MPC · JPL
860282	2013 YX_{35}	—	December 4, 2013	Haleakala	Pan-STARRS 1	·	700 m	MPC · JPL
860283	2013 YR_{43}	—	February 15, 2010	Catalina	CSS	·	1.3 km	MPC · JPL
860284	2013 YK_{44}	—	November 29, 2013	Mount Lemmon	Mount Lemmon Survey	·	1.1 km	MPC · JPL
860285	2013 YV_{45}	—	December 27, 2013	Kitt Peak	Spacewatch	·	790 m	MPC · JPL
860286	2013 YW_{45}	—	December 21, 2006	Kitt Peak	Spacewatch	·	630 m	MPC · JPL
860287	2013 YO_{47}	—	October 21, 2006	Mount Lemmon	Mount Lemmon Survey	·	620 m	MPC · JPL
860288	2013 YB_{48}	—	December 28, 2013	Mount Lemmon	Mount Lemmon Survey	AMO	140 m	MPC · JPL
860289	2013 YU_{49}	—	December 24, 2013	Mount Lemmon	Mount Lemmon Survey	·	1.5 km	MPC · JPL
860290	2013 YO_{59}	—	December 4, 2013	Haleakala	Pan-STARRS 1	HNS	1.0 km	MPC · JPL
860291	2013 YR_{59}	—	December 27, 2013	Kitt Peak	Spacewatch	·	900 m	MPC · JPL
860292	2013 YJ_{61}	—	December 27, 2013	Kitt Peak	Spacewatch	V	520 m	MPC · JPL
860293	2013 YR_{61}	—	December 27, 2013	Kitt Peak	Spacewatch	H	420 m	MPC · JPL
860294	2013 YS_{61}	—	December 10, 2013	Mount Lemmon	Mount Lemmon Survey	EUN	800 m	MPC · JPL
860295	2013 YP_{66}	—	February 27, 2006	Kitt Peak	Spacewatch	·	1.0 km	MPC · JPL
860296	2013 YP_{73}	—	December 25, 2013	Kitt Peak	Spacewatch	·	1.1 km	MPC · JPL
860297	2013 YY_{78}	—	January 7, 2006	Kitt Peak	Spacewatch	·	910 m	MPC · JPL
860298	2013 YY_{80}	—	December 13, 2013	Mount Lemmon	Mount Lemmon Survey	·	1.4 km	MPC · JPL
860299	2013 YS_{81}	—	December 28, 2013	Kitt Peak	Spacewatch	·	990 m	MPC · JPL
860300	2013 YP_{82}	—	December 28, 2013	Kitt Peak	Spacewatch	·	710 m	MPC · JPL

== 860301–860400 ==
back to top

Designation			Discovery			Properties		Ref
Permanent	Provisional	Named after	Date	Site	Discoverer(s)	Category	Diam.	Ref
860301	2013 YR_{84}	—	December 28, 2013	Kitt Peak	Spacewatch	·	1.1 km	MPC · JPL
860302	2013 YB_{91}	—	December 28, 2013	Kitt Peak	Spacewatch	·	1.6 km	MPC · JPL
860303	2013 YP_{92}	—	December 29, 2013	Haleakala	Pan-STARRS 1	·	2.3 km	MPC · JPL
860304	2013 YD_{94}	—	October 3, 2008	Mount Lemmon	Mount Lemmon Survey	·	1.1 km	MPC · JPL
860305	2013 YG_{96}	—	December 30, 2013	Kitt Peak	Spacewatch	·	1.3 km	MPC · JPL
860306	2013 YA_{97}	—	December 30, 2013	Haleakala	Pan-STARRS 1	·	1.8 km	MPC · JPL
860307	2013 YZ_{97}	—	March 15, 2007	Kitt Peak	Spacewatch	·	880 m	MPC · JPL
860308	2013 YH_{98}	—	December 31, 2013	Kitt Peak	Spacewatch	HNS	830 m	MPC · JPL
860309	2013 YC_{100}	—	December 31, 2013	Kitt Peak	Spacewatch	·	1.3 km	MPC · JPL
860310	2013 YY_{103}	—	November 20, 2009	Mount Lemmon	Mount Lemmon Survey	·	1.1 km	MPC · JPL
860311	2013 YO_{109}	—	December 13, 2013	Mount Lemmon	Mount Lemmon Survey	HNS	960 m	MPC · JPL
860312	2013 YK_{112}	—	December 30, 2013	Kitt Peak	Spacewatch	(5)	980 m	MPC · JPL
860313	2013 YS_{112}	—	December 30, 2013	Kitt Peak	Spacewatch	·	1.2 km	MPC · JPL
860314	2013 YD_{117}	—	December 30, 2013	Mount Lemmon	Mount Lemmon Survey	·	550 m	MPC · JPL
860315	2013 YJ_{117}	—	December 30, 2013	Mount Lemmon	Mount Lemmon Survey	·	1.4 km	MPC · JPL
860316	2013 YA_{118}	—	December 24, 2013	Mount Lemmon	Mount Lemmon Survey	·	390 m	MPC · JPL
860317	2013 YW_{118}	—	December 30, 2013	Haleakala	Pan-STARRS 1	MAR	760 m	MPC · JPL
860318	2013 YH_{122}	—	December 30, 2013	Haleakala	Pan-STARRS 1	·	870 m	MPC · JPL
860319	2013 YO_{122}	—	July 29, 2008	Kitt Peak	Spacewatch	·	790 m	MPC · JPL
860320	2013 YU_{126}	—	January 6, 2010	Mount Lemmon	Mount Lemmon Survey	·	1.6 km	MPC · JPL
860321	2013 YE_{127}	—	December 27, 2013	Kitt Peak	Spacewatch	·	580 m	MPC · JPL
860322	2013 YB_{130}	—	December 31, 2013	Mount Lemmon	Mount Lemmon Survey	·	1.1 km	MPC · JPL
860323	2013 YM_{136}	—	December 31, 2013	Mount Lemmon	Mount Lemmon Survey	EUN	930 m	MPC · JPL
860324	2013 YG_{138}	—	December 6, 2013	Haleakala	Pan-STARRS 1	·	2.2 km	MPC · JPL
860325	2013 YS_{140}	—	December 31, 2013	Mount Lemmon	Mount Lemmon Survey	·	570 m	MPC · JPL
860326	2013 YR_{144}	—	December 31, 2013	Mount Lemmon	Mount Lemmon Survey	·	1.4 km	MPC · JPL
860327	2013 YS_{144}	—	December 31, 2013	Mount Lemmon	Mount Lemmon Survey	·	940 m	MPC · JPL
860328	2013 YD_{145}	—	December 31, 2013	Mount Lemmon	Mount Lemmon Survey	·	1.2 km	MPC · JPL
860329	2013 YR_{145}	—	December 31, 2013	Mount Lemmon	Mount Lemmon Survey	·	820 m	MPC · JPL
860330	2013 YM_{151}	—	December 11, 2013	Mount Lemmon	Mount Lemmon Survey	EUN	990 m	MPC · JPL
860331	2013 YR_{151}	—	December 25, 2013	Mount Lemmon	Mount Lemmon Survey	·	2.0 km	MPC · JPL
860332	2013 YT_{151}	—	December 31, 2013	SATINO Remote	J. Jahn	·	1.3 km	MPC · JPL
860333	2013 YB_{156}	—	May 11, 2015	Mount Lemmon	Mount Lemmon Survey	EUN	730 m	MPC · JPL
860334	2013 YU_{156}	—	December 30, 2013	Mount Lemmon	Mount Lemmon Survey	H	440 m	MPC · JPL
860335	2013 YJ_{157}	—	December 29, 2013	Haleakala	Pan-STARRS 1	·	840 m	MPC · JPL
860336	2013 YH_{158}	—	December 28, 2013	Kitt Peak	Spacewatch	·	2.9 km	MPC · JPL
860337	2013 YL_{159}	—	December 31, 2013	Kitt Peak	Spacewatch	·	1.3 km	MPC · JPL
860338	2013 YT_{159}	—	March 10, 2018	Haleakala	Pan-STARRS 1	·	500 m	MPC · JPL
860339	2013 YO_{160}	—	December 28, 2013	Catalina	CSS	(1547)	1.3 km	MPC · JPL
860340	2013 YT_{160}	—	December 25, 2013	Mount Lemmon	Mount Lemmon Survey	·	860 m	MPC · JPL
860341	2013 YE_{161}	—	January 17, 2015	Haleakala	Pan-STARRS 1	·	3.3 km	MPC · JPL
860342	2013 YR_{162}	—	December 30, 2013	Mount Lemmon	Mount Lemmon Survey	NYS	880 m	MPC · JPL
860343	2013 YX_{162}	—	December 25, 2013	Haleakala	Pan-STARRS 1	H	360 m	MPC · JPL
860344	2013 YK_{163}	—	December 25, 2013	Mount Lemmon	Mount Lemmon Survey	MAS	530 m	MPC · JPL
860345	2013 YO_{163}	—	December 31, 2013	Haleakala	Pan-STARRS 1	·	890 m	MPC · JPL
860346	2013 YT_{163}	—	December 24, 2013	Mount Lemmon	Mount Lemmon Survey	EUN	790 m	MPC · JPL
860347	2013 YV_{163}	—	December 25, 2013	Mount Lemmon	Mount Lemmon Survey	·	1.9 km	MPC · JPL
860348	2013 YS_{165}	—	December 24, 2013	Mount Lemmon	Mount Lemmon Survey	·	560 m	MPC · JPL
860349	2013 YW_{165}	—	December 31, 2013	Kitt Peak	Spacewatch	·	810 m	MPC · JPL
860350	2013 YK_{166}	—	December 31, 2013	Haleakala	Pan-STARRS 1	·	910 m	MPC · JPL
860351	2013 YA_{167}	—	December 31, 2013	Kitt Peak	Spacewatch	·	520 m	MPC · JPL
860352	2013 YC_{168}	—	December 31, 2013	Haleakala	Pan-STARRS 1	·	1.1 km	MPC · JPL
860353	2013 YS_{168}	—	December 25, 2013	Mount Lemmon	Mount Lemmon Survey	·	1.6 km	MPC · JPL
860354	2013 YN_{169}	—	December 24, 2013	Mount Lemmon	Mount Lemmon Survey	·	910 m	MPC · JPL
860355	2013 YT_{169}	—	December 25, 2013	Mount Lemmon	Mount Lemmon Survey	·	770 m	MPC · JPL
860356	2013 YU_{169}	—	December 30, 2013	Kitt Peak	Spacewatch	·	1.1 km	MPC · JPL
860357	2013 YC_{171}	—	December 27, 2009	Kitt Peak	Spacewatch	·	970 m	MPC · JPL
860358	2013 YL_{172}	—	June 25, 2011	Kitt Peak	Spacewatch	EUN	870 m	MPC · JPL
860359	2013 YY_{172}	—	December 28, 2013	Kitt Peak	Spacewatch	·	1.7 km	MPC · JPL
860360	2014 AK_{2}	—	December 25, 2013	Kitt Peak	Spacewatch	·	760 m	MPC · JPL
860361	2014 AM_{2}	—	January 1, 2014	Haleakala	Pan-STARRS 1	·	850 m	MPC · JPL
860362	2014 AK_{3}	—	January 1, 2014	Haleakala	Pan-STARRS 1	·	1.1 km	MPC · JPL
860363	2014 AY_{3}	—	January 1, 2014	Haleakala	Pan-STARRS 1	·	950 m	MPC · JPL
860364	2014 AN_{4}	—	January 1, 2014	Haleakala	Pan-STARRS 1	EUN	900 m	MPC · JPL
860365	2014 AX_{5}	—	January 1, 2014	Mount Lemmon	Mount Lemmon Survey	·	850 m	MPC · JPL
860366	2014 AP_{7}	—	January 1, 2014	Haleakala	Pan-STARRS 1	·	1.2 km	MPC · JPL
860367	2014 AC_{10}	—	January 8, 2010	Mount Lemmon	Mount Lemmon Survey	·	1.3 km	MPC · JPL
860368	2014 AB_{11}	—	January 1, 2014	Mount Lemmon	Mount Lemmon Survey	·	1.1 km	MPC · JPL
860369	2014 AJ_{14}	—	January 1, 2014	Haleakala	Pan-STARRS 1	·	1.1 km	MPC · JPL
860370	2014 AN_{14}	—	January 3, 2014	Catalina	CSS	·	900 m	MPC · JPL
860371	2014 AE_{15}	—	January 3, 2014	Mount Lemmon	Mount Lemmon Survey	·	1.2 km	MPC · JPL
860372	2014 AG_{15}	—	January 3, 2014	Mount Lemmon	Mount Lemmon Survey	·	1.3 km	MPC · JPL
860373	2014 AN_{15}	—	January 8, 2010	Kitt Peak	Spacewatch	BAR	930 m	MPC · JPL
860374	2014 AR_{15}	—	December 1, 2006	Mount Lemmon	Mount Lemmon Survey	·	470 m	MPC · JPL
860375	2014 AD_{17}	—	January 3, 2014	Mount Lemmon	Mount Lemmon Survey	AMO	320 m	MPC · JPL
860376	2014 AC_{18}	—	January 1, 2014	Haleakala	Pan-STARRS 1	MAS	520 m	MPC · JPL
860377	2014 AW_{18}	—	August 19, 2001	Cerro Tololo	Deep Ecliptic Survey	·	660 m	MPC · JPL
860378	2014 AS_{19}	—	December 24, 2013	Mount Lemmon	Mount Lemmon Survey	·	860 m	MPC · JPL
860379	2014 AP_{20}	—	January 2, 2014	Kitt Peak	Spacewatch	HNS	1.1 km	MPC · JPL
860380	2014 AS_{21}	—	January 3, 2014	Kitt Peak	Spacewatch	·	1.1 km	MPC · JPL
860381	2014 AL_{23}	—	December 24, 2013	Mount Lemmon	Mount Lemmon Survey	·	490 m	MPC · JPL
860382	2014 AJ_{24}	—	August 26, 2012	Haleakala	Pan-STARRS 1	·	1.6 km	MPC · JPL
860383	2014 AX_{24}	—	January 3, 2014	Kitt Peak	Spacewatch	·	800 m	MPC · JPL
860384	2014 AY_{24}	—	January 3, 2014	Kitt Peak	Spacewatch	·	830 m	MPC · JPL
860385	2014 AF_{25}	—	April 9, 2010	Mount Lemmon	Mount Lemmon Survey	·	1.1 km	MPC · JPL
860386	2014 AL_{28}	—	December 24, 2013	Mount Lemmon	Mount Lemmon Survey	HNS	960 m	MPC · JPL
860387	2014 AR_{28}	—	December 11, 2013	Haleakala	Pan-STARRS 1	·	900 m	MPC · JPL
860388	2014 AB_{32}	—	January 4, 2014	Haleakala	Pan-STARRS 1	·	670 m	MPC · JPL
860389	2014 AO_{33}	—	December 11, 2013	Mount Lemmon	Mount Lemmon Survey	·	1.2 km	MPC · JPL
860390	2014 AY_{37}	—	August 13, 2012	Haleakala	Pan-STARRS 1	·	1.2 km	MPC · JPL
860391	2014 AD_{39}	—	January 3, 2014	Kitt Peak	Spacewatch	BRG	1.1 km	MPC · JPL
860392	2014 AO_{39}	—	January 3, 2014	Mount Lemmon	Mount Lemmon Survey	H	370 m	MPC · JPL
860393	2014 AY_{39}	—	January 3, 2014	Mount Lemmon	Mount Lemmon Survey	·	1 km	MPC · JPL
860394	2014 AT_{41}	—	January 1, 2014	Kitt Peak	Spacewatch	·	810 m	MPC · JPL
860395	2014 AL_{44}	—	November 26, 1992	Kitt Peak	Spacewatch	·	710 m	MPC · JPL
860396	2014 AF_{46}	—	September 29, 2008	Mount Lemmon	Mount Lemmon Survey	·	1.3 km	MPC · JPL
860397	2014 AC_{48}	—	January 3, 2014	Kitt Peak	Spacewatch	·	1.7 km	MPC · JPL
860398	2014 AC_{49}	—	January 7, 2014	Kitt Peak	Spacewatch	·	1.0 km	MPC · JPL
860399	2014 AC_{51}	—	January 11, 2014	Mount Lemmon	Mount Lemmon Survey	EUN	840 m	MPC · JPL
860400	2014 AM_{53}	—	December 6, 2013	Haleakala	Pan-STARRS 1	·	1.2 km	MPC · JPL

== 860401–860500 ==
back to top

Designation			Discovery			Properties		Ref
Permanent	Provisional	Named after	Date	Site	Discoverer(s)	Category	Diam.	Ref
860401	2014 AB_{56}	—	January 5, 2014	Haleakala	Pan-STARRS 1	H	390 m	MPC · JPL
860402	2014 AW_{59}	—	January 10, 2014	Mount Lemmon	Mount Lemmon Survey	·	930 m	MPC · JPL
860403	2014 AK_{62}	—	January 10, 2014	Mount Lemmon	Mount Lemmon Survey	·	1.1 km	MPC · JPL
860404	2014 AV_{62}	—	January 3, 2014	Mount Lemmon	Mount Lemmon Survey	·	1.3 km	MPC · JPL
860405	2014 AC_{63}	—	January 10, 2014	Kitt Peak	Spacewatch	·	1.4 km	MPC · JPL
860406	2014 AX_{63}	—	January 1, 2014	Kitt Peak	Spacewatch	·	740 m	MPC · JPL
860407	2014 AC_{64}	—	January 10, 2014	Mount Lemmon	Mount Lemmon Survey	·	910 m	MPC · JPL
860408	2014 AF_{64}	—	January 9, 2014	Kitt Peak	Spacewatch	MIS	1.7 km	MPC · JPL
860409	2014 AG_{64}	—	January 12, 2014	Mount Lemmon	Mount Lemmon Survey	·	1.1 km	MPC · JPL
860410	2014 AJ_{64}	—	January 9, 2014	Mount Lemmon	Mount Lemmon Survey	EUN	850 m	MPC · JPL
860411	2014 AP_{64}	—	January 9, 2014	Mount Lemmon	Mount Lemmon Survey	·	860 m	MPC · JPL
860412	2014 AQ_{64}	—	January 11, 2014	Kitt Peak	Spacewatch	·	570 m	MPC · JPL
860413	2014 AR_{64}	—	August 17, 2012	Haleakala	Pan-STARRS 1	·	1.0 km	MPC · JPL
860414	2014 AX_{64}	—	January 7, 2014	Mount Lemmon	Mount Lemmon Survey	PHO	730 m	MPC · JPL
860415	2014 AK_{66}	—	January 9, 2014	Mount Lemmon	Mount Lemmon Survey	·	1.4 km	MPC · JPL
860416	2014 AM_{66}	—	January 15, 2018	Mount Lemmon	Mount Lemmon Survey	PHO	680 m	MPC · JPL
860417	2014 AY_{66}	—	April 19, 2015	Kitt Peak	Spacewatch	HNS	900 m	MPC · JPL
860418	2014 AR_{67}	—	January 9, 2014	Kitt Peak	Spacewatch	·	1.2 km	MPC · JPL
860419	2014 AA_{70}	—	January 9, 2014	Mount Lemmon	Mount Lemmon Survey	HNS	820 m	MPC · JPL
860420	2014 AK_{70}	—	January 3, 2014	Kitt Peak	Spacewatch	·	1.1 km	MPC · JPL
860421	2014 AG_{71}	—	January 3, 2014	Kitt Peak	Spacewatch	·	800 m	MPC · JPL
860422	2014 AH_{71}	—	January 10, 2014	Mount Lemmon	Mount Lemmon Survey	·	860 m	MPC · JPL
860423	2014 AK_{74}	—	November 9, 2009	Mount Lemmon	Mount Lemmon Survey	·	830 m	MPC · JPL
860424	2014 AO_{74}	—	January 5, 2014	Kitt Peak	Spacewatch	·	1.5 km	MPC · JPL
860425	2014 AA_{75}	—	January 10, 2014	Kitt Peak	Spacewatch	·	1.2 km	MPC · JPL
860426	2014 AC_{75}	—	January 1, 2014	Haleakala	Pan-STARRS 1	·	1.8 km	MPC · JPL
860427	2014 AR_{75}	—	January 3, 2014	Mount Lemmon	Mount Lemmon Survey	·	1.6 km	MPC · JPL
860428	2014 AY_{75}	—	January 1, 2014	Haleakala	Pan-STARRS 1	MAR	850 m	MPC · JPL
860429	2014 AC_{76}	—	January 3, 2014	Kitt Peak	Spacewatch	·	1.5 km	MPC · JPL
860430	2014 AE_{76}	—	January 7, 2014	Kitt Peak	Spacewatch	·	1.2 km	MPC · JPL
860431	2014 AO_{76}	—	January 3, 2014	Mount Lemmon	Mount Lemmon Survey	·	1.2 km	MPC · JPL
860432	2014 AS_{76}	—	January 1, 2014	Kitt Peak	Spacewatch	·	840 m	MPC · JPL
860433	2014 AV_{76}	—	January 1, 2014	Kitt Peak	Spacewatch	EUN	750 m	MPC · JPL
860434	2014 AB_{77}	—	January 7, 2014	Mount Lemmon	Mount Lemmon Survey	·	800 m	MPC · JPL
860435	2014 AW_{77}	—	January 9, 2014	Mount Lemmon	Mount Lemmon Survey	·	1.3 km	MPC · JPL
860436	2014 AM_{78}	—	November 9, 2009	Mount Lemmon	Mount Lemmon Survey	·	680 m	MPC · JPL
860437	2014 AP_{79}	—	January 1, 2014	Haleakala	Pan-STARRS 1	·	1.1 km	MPC · JPL
860438	2014 AX_{79}	—	January 1, 2014	Haleakala	Pan-STARRS 1	V	450 m	MPC · JPL
860439	2014 BZ	—	November 4, 2013	Haleakala	Pan-STARRS 1	·	1.3 km	MPC · JPL
860440	2014 BT_{9}	—	January 3, 2014	Catalina	CSS	·	1.3 km	MPC · JPL
860441	2014 BS_{10}	—	December 31, 2013	Mount Lemmon	Mount Lemmon Survey	ADE	1.3 km	MPC · JPL
860442	2014 BG_{11}	—	January 21, 2014	Kitt Peak	Spacewatch	·	800 m	MPC · JPL
860443	2014 BM_{11}	—	December 14, 2013	Mount Lemmon	Mount Lemmon Survey	·	1.3 km	MPC · JPL
860444	2014 BN_{13}	—	December 30, 2013	Mount Lemmon	Mount Lemmon Survey	·	1.0 km	MPC · JPL
860445	2014 BM_{14}	—	December 4, 2013	Haleakala	Pan-STARRS 1	·	930 m	MPC · JPL
860446	2014 BR_{14}	—	December 31, 2013	Mount Lemmon	Mount Lemmon Survey	HNS	890 m	MPC · JPL
860447	2014 BD_{16}	—	January 1, 2014	Haleakala	Pan-STARRS 1	·	1.4 km	MPC · JPL
860448	2014 BV_{16}	—	January 1, 2014	Haleakala	Pan-STARRS 1	EUN	880 m	MPC · JPL
860449	2014 BZ_{16}	—	December 31, 2013	Mount Lemmon	Mount Lemmon Survey	·	940 m	MPC · JPL
860450	2014 BL_{18}	—	September 24, 2008	Kitt Peak	Spacewatch	·	1.1 km	MPC · JPL
860451	2014 BN_{19}	—	December 11, 2013	Mount Lemmon	Mount Lemmon Survey	·	730 m	MPC · JPL
860452	2014 BF_{20}	—	January 23, 2014	Kitt Peak	Spacewatch	H	390 m	MPC · JPL
860453	2014 BW_{23}	—	April 2, 2009	Mount Lemmon	Mount Lemmon Survey	·	2.4 km	MPC · JPL
860454	2014 BC_{24}	—	January 24, 2014	Haleakala	Pan-STARRS 1	·	1.7 km	MPC · JPL
860455	2014 BS_{24}	—	November 6, 2013	Haleakala	Pan-STARRS 1	T_{j} (2.96)	3.2 km	MPC · JPL
860456	2014 BC_{25}	—	January 24, 2014	Haleakala	Pan-STARRS 1	H	310 m	MPC · JPL
860457	2014 BP_{27}	—	December 31, 2013	Haleakala	Pan-STARRS 1	H	320 m	MPC · JPL
860458	2014 BU_{33}	—	March 11, 2007	Kitt Peak	Spacewatch	·	840 m	MPC · JPL
860459	2014 BA_{40}	—	December 30, 2013	Kitt Peak	Spacewatch	·	1.0 km	MPC · JPL
860460	2014 BU_{40}	—	September 6, 2008	Kitt Peak	Spacewatch	·	1.0 km	MPC · JPL
860461	2014 BP_{41}	—	August 21, 2012	Haleakala	Pan-STARRS 1	·	1 km	MPC · JPL
860462	2014 BW_{42}	—	September 20, 2009	Mount Lemmon	Mount Lemmon Survey	·	630 m	MPC · JPL
860463	2014 BU_{44}	—	January 9, 2014	Mount Lemmon	Mount Lemmon Survey	·	1.1 km	MPC · JPL
860464	2014 BQ_{45}	—	January 10, 2014	Kitt Peak	Spacewatch	·	1.3 km	MPC · JPL
860465	2014 BM_{50}	—	January 24, 2014	Haleakala	Pan-STARRS 1	·	820 m	MPC · JPL
860466	2014 BA_{56}	—	January 28, 2014	Mount Lemmon	Mount Lemmon Survey	·	730 m	MPC · JPL
860467	2014 BO_{56}	—	September 15, 2012	Catalina	CSS	DOR	1.8 km	MPC · JPL
860468	2014 BO_{57}	—	January 26, 2014	Haleakala	Pan-STARRS 1	·	360 m	MPC · JPL
860469	2014 BB_{58}	—	November 18, 2009	Kitt Peak	Spacewatch	·	880 m	MPC · JPL
860470	2014 BZ_{59}	—	January 26, 2014	Haleakala	Pan-STARRS 1	H	310 m	MPC · JPL
860471	2014 BZ_{62}	—	December 4, 2007	Mount Lemmon	Mount Lemmon Survey	TIR	2.0 km	MPC · JPL
860472	2014 BK_{65}	—	January 28, 2014	Kitt Peak	Spacewatch	EUN	900 m	MPC · JPL
860473	2014 BU_{67}	—	January 24, 2014	Haleakala	Pan-STARRS 1	·	1.1 km	MPC · JPL
860474	2014 BS_{68}	—	January 28, 2014	Kitt Peak	Spacewatch	·	1.6 km	MPC · JPL
860475	2014 BC_{71}	—	January 29, 2014	Catalina	CSS	·	1.7 km	MPC · JPL
860476	2014 BU_{71}	—	January 28, 2014	Mount Lemmon	Mount Lemmon Survey	·	1.2 km	MPC · JPL
860477	2014 BP_{72}	—	January 3, 2014	Kitt Peak	Spacewatch	·	970 m	MPC · JPL
860478	2014 BR_{72}	—	January 28, 2014	Mount Lemmon	Mount Lemmon Survey	HNS	860 m	MPC · JPL
860479	2014 BF_{73}	—	January 21, 2014	Mount Lemmon	Mount Lemmon Survey	·	740 m	MPC · JPL
860480	2014 BK_{74}	—	May 29, 2015	Haleakala	Pan-STARRS 1	·	1.4 km	MPC · JPL
860481	2014 BN_{74}	—	January 24, 2014	Haleakala	Pan-STARRS 1	·	890 m	MPC · JPL
860482	2014 BB_{75}	—	October 1, 1995	Kitt Peak	Spacewatch	·	620 m	MPC · JPL
860483	2014 BE_{75}	—	July 5, 2016	Haleakala	Pan-STARRS 1	·	1.4 km	MPC · JPL
860484	2014 BF_{75}	—	January 30, 2014	Kitt Peak	Spacewatch	·	1.4 km	MPC · JPL
860485	2014 BO_{75}	—	January 30, 2014	Kitt Peak	Spacewatch	·	1.1 km	MPC · JPL
860486	2014 BS_{75}	—	January 26, 2014	Nogales	M. Schwartz, P. R. Holvorcem	MAS	540 m	MPC · JPL
860487	2014 BX_{76}	—	January 20, 2014	Mount Lemmon	Mount Lemmon Survey	·	710 m	MPC · JPL
860488	2014 BY_{76}	—	January 25, 2014	Haleakala	Pan-STARRS 1	·	810 m	MPC · JPL
860489	2014 BA_{77}	—	January 28, 2014	Kitt Peak	Spacewatch	·	1.2 km	MPC · JPL
860490	2014 BB_{79}	—	January 28, 2014	Mount Lemmon	Mount Lemmon Survey	·	760 m	MPC · JPL
860491	2014 BW_{79}	—	January 23, 2014	Catalina	CSS	H	380 m	MPC · JPL
860492	2014 BY_{79}	—	January 28, 2014	Mount Lemmon	Mount Lemmon Survey	·	1.3 km	MPC · JPL
860493	2014 BE_{80}	—	January 28, 2014	Mount Lemmon	Mount Lemmon Survey	·	760 m	MPC · JPL
860494	2014 BY_{80}	—	January 24, 2014	Haleakala	Pan-STARRS 1	·	1.3 km	MPC · JPL
860495	2014 BF_{81}	—	January 25, 2014	Haleakala	Pan-STARRS 1	·	640 m	MPC · JPL
860496	2014 BB_{82}	—	September 29, 2008	Mount Lemmon	Mount Lemmon Survey	·	1.0 km	MPC · JPL
860497	2014 BY_{82}	—	January 28, 2014	Mount Lemmon	Mount Lemmon Survey	·	1.4 km	MPC · JPL
860498	2014 BZ_{82}	—	January 29, 2014	Kitt Peak	Spacewatch	·	750 m	MPC · JPL
860499	2014 BM_{83}	—	January 25, 2014	Haleakala	Pan-STARRS 1	·	440 m	MPC · JPL
860500	2014 BP_{83}	—	January 28, 2014	Mount Lemmon	Mount Lemmon Survey	·	590 m	MPC · JPL

== 860501–860600 ==
back to top

Designation			Discovery			Properties		Ref
Permanent	Provisional	Named after	Date	Site	Discoverer(s)	Category	Diam.	Ref
860501	2014 BR_{85}	—	January 24, 2014	Haleakala	Pan-STARRS 1	·	1.4 km	MPC · JPL
860502	2014 BS_{85}	—	January 24, 2014	Haleakala	Pan-STARRS 1	·	1.2 km	MPC · JPL
860503	2014 BT_{87}	—	January 24, 2014	Haleakala	Pan-STARRS 1	·	1.1 km	MPC · JPL
860504	2014 BZ_{87}	—	January 25, 2014	Haleakala	Pan-STARRS 1	·	930 m	MPC · JPL
860505	2014 BA_{88}	—	January 24, 2014	Haleakala	Pan-STARRS 1	·	1.0 km	MPC · JPL
860506	2014 BS_{88}	—	January 24, 2014	Haleakala	Pan-STARRS 1	·	1.6 km	MPC · JPL
860507	2014 BN_{89}	—	January 26, 2014	Haleakala	Pan-STARRS 1	H	320 m	MPC · JPL
860508	2014 BL_{90}	—	January 23, 2014	Mount Lemmon	Mount Lemmon Survey	·	460 m	MPC · JPL
860509	2014 BM_{90}	—	January 24, 2014	Haleakala	Pan-STARRS 1	EUN	890 m	MPC · JPL
860510	2014 BC_{91}	—	January 24, 2014	Haleakala	Pan-STARRS 1	·	970 m	MPC · JPL
860511	2014 BR_{91}	—	January 24, 2014	Haleakala	Pan-STARRS 1	·	730 m	MPC · JPL
860512	2014 CD_{1}	—	January 3, 2014	Kitt Peak	Spacewatch	BRA	1.2 km	MPC · JPL
860513	2014 CC_{4}	—	January 2, 2009	Mount Lemmon	Mount Lemmon Survey	·	1.1 km	MPC · JPL
860514	2014 CN_{7}	—	January 24, 2014	Haleakala	Pan-STARRS 1	·	1.1 km	MPC · JPL
860515	2014 CK_{9}	—	January 24, 2014	Haleakala	Pan-STARRS 1	·	1.3 km	MPC · JPL
860516	2014 CE_{10}	—	August 4, 2005	Palomar	NEAT	·	1.1 km	MPC · JPL
860517	2014 CO_{10}	—	September 26, 2003	Sacramento Peak	SDSS	·	1.3 km	MPC · JPL
860518	2014 CX_{13}	—	February 9, 2014	Haleakala	Pan-STARRS 1	·	770 m	MPC · JPL
860519	2014 CJ_{14}	—	February 10, 2014	Haleakala	Pan-STARRS 1	AMO	220 m	MPC · JPL
860520	2014 CS_{16}	—	January 29, 2014	Kitt Peak	Spacewatch	ADE	1.3 km	MPC · JPL
860521	2014 CJ_{21}	—	January 5, 2014	Haleakala	Pan-STARRS 1	·	1.2 km	MPC · JPL
860522	2014 CT_{23}	—	February 2, 2014	ESA OGS	ESA OGS	H	400 m	MPC · JPL
860523	2014 CT_{28}	—	February 11, 2014	Catalina	CSS	·	1.6 km	MPC · JPL
860524	2014 CJ_{30}	—	January 29, 2014	Kitt Peak	Spacewatch	JUN	700 m	MPC · JPL
860525	2014 CW_{30}	—	February 10, 2014	Haleakala	Pan-STARRS 1	·	2.4 km	MPC · JPL
860526	2014 CX_{31}	—	February 10, 2014	Haleakala	Pan-STARRS 1	·	2.2 km	MPC · JPL
860527	2014 CR_{32}	—	February 9, 2014	Kitt Peak	Spacewatch	·	540 m	MPC · JPL
860528	2014 CT_{32}	—	February 8, 2014	Mount Lemmon	Mount Lemmon Survey	·	530 m	MPC · JPL
860529	2014 CU_{33}	—	November 20, 2006	Catalina	CSS	PHO	750 m	MPC · JPL
860530	2014 CE_{34}	—	February 6, 2014	Mount Lemmon	Mount Lemmon Survey	·	470 m	MPC · JPL
860531	2014 CZ_{34}	—	February 2, 2005	Kitt Peak	Spacewatch	·	1.2 km	MPC · JPL
860532	2014 CZ_{35}	—	February 10, 2014	Haleakala	Pan-STARRS 1	·	770 m	MPC · JPL
860533	2014 CM_{36}	—	February 11, 2014	Mount Lemmon	Mount Lemmon Survey	H	420 m	MPC · JPL
860534	2014 CY_{36}	—	February 6, 2014	Mount Lemmon	Mount Lemmon Survey	·	610 m	MPC · JPL
860535	2014 CZ_{36}	—	February 9, 2014	Mount Lemmon	Mount Lemmon Survey	·	780 m	MPC · JPL
860536	2014 DL_{5}	—	January 3, 2014	Mount Lemmon	Mount Lemmon Survey	·	950 m	MPC · JPL
860537	2014 DM_{6}	—	January 9, 2014	Catalina	CSS	BAR	930 m	MPC · JPL
860538	2014 DJ_{11}	—	February 23, 2014	Haleakala	Pan-STARRS 1	H	340 m	MPC · JPL
860539	2014 DD_{12}	—	December 27, 2013	Mount Lemmon	Mount Lemmon Survey	H	350 m	MPC · JPL
860540	2014 DL_{15}	—	February 11, 2014	Mount Lemmon	Mount Lemmon Survey	·	1.3 km	MPC · JPL
860541	2014 DM_{17}	—	March 13, 2010	Mount Lemmon	Mount Lemmon Survey	·	1.2 km	MPC · JPL
860542	2014 DL_{18}	—	January 28, 2014	Kitt Peak	Spacewatch	ADE	1.6 km	MPC · JPL
860543	2014 DQ_{19}	—	February 22, 2014	Palomar	Palomar Transient Factory	·	840 m	MPC · JPL
860544	2014 DR_{20}	—	February 24, 2014	Haleakala	Pan-STARRS 1	·	1.5 km	MPC · JPL
860545	2014 DY_{22}	—	November 27, 2013	Haleakala	Pan-STARRS 1	·	1.3 km	MPC · JPL
860546	2014 DU_{23}	—	January 5, 2014	Haleakala	Pan-STARRS 1	·	1.3 km	MPC · JPL
860547	2014 DC_{28}	—	March 14, 2007	Kitt Peak	Spacewatch	NYS	690 m	MPC · JPL
860548	2014 DL_{30}	—	February 20, 2014	Mount Lemmon	Mount Lemmon Survey	·	1.5 km	MPC · JPL
860549	2014 DC_{31}	—	February 20, 2014	Mount Lemmon	Mount Lemmon Survey	·	490 m	MPC · JPL
860550	2014 DO_{31}	—	February 20, 2014	Mount Lemmon	Mount Lemmon Survey	PHO	560 m	MPC · JPL
860551	2014 DM_{33}	—	February 11, 2014	Mount Lemmon	Mount Lemmon Survey	·	1.7 km	MPC · JPL
860552	2014 DT_{33}	—	February 21, 2014	Kitt Peak	Spacewatch	·	690 m	MPC · JPL
860553	2014 DA_{35}	—	February 22, 2014	Mount Lemmon	Mount Lemmon Survey	·	920 m	MPC · JPL
860554	2014 DH_{35}	—	February 11, 2014	Mount Lemmon	Mount Lemmon Survey	H	360 m	MPC · JPL
860555	2014 DW_{37}	—	May 3, 2008	Mount Lemmon	Mount Lemmon Survey	·	450 m	MPC · JPL
860556	2014 DJ_{38}	—	February 22, 2014	Mount Lemmon	Mount Lemmon Survey	H	340 m	MPC · JPL
860557	2014 DQ_{39}	—	January 9, 2014	Haleakala	Pan-STARRS 1	PHO	790 m	MPC · JPL
860558	2014 DM_{40}	—	December 31, 2013	Kitt Peak	Spacewatch	EUN	760 m	MPC · JPL
860559	2014 DZ_{42}	—	July 27, 2011	Haleakala	Pan-STARRS 1	·	1.1 km	MPC · JPL
860560	2014 DE_{43}	—	September 28, 1994	Kitt Peak	Spacewatch	·	1.5 km	MPC · JPL
860561	2014 DW_{43}	—	February 26, 2014	Mount Lemmon	Mount Lemmon Survey	·	470 m	MPC · JPL
860562	2014 DA_{45}	—	February 26, 2014	Mount Lemmon	Mount Lemmon Survey	·	790 m	MPC · JPL
860563	2014 DL_{48}	—	February 26, 2014	Haleakala	Pan-STARRS 1	·	610 m	MPC · JPL
860564	2014 DS_{49}	—	September 23, 2008	Mount Lemmon	Mount Lemmon Survey	(5)	890 m	MPC · JPL
860565	2014 DF_{51}	—	February 26, 2014	Haleakala	Pan-STARRS 1	·	1.3 km	MPC · JPL
860566	2014 DJ_{55}	—	October 28, 2008	Mount Lemmon	Mount Lemmon Survey	·	810 m	MPC · JPL
860567	2014 DC_{59}	—	October 17, 2012	Haleakala	Pan-STARRS 1	·	1.2 km	MPC · JPL
860568	2014 DJ_{59}	—	February 26, 2014	Haleakala	Pan-STARRS 1	MRX	720 m	MPC · JPL
860569	2014 DV_{63}	—	February 26, 2014	Haleakala	Pan-STARRS 1	·	490 m	MPC · JPL
860570	2014 DE_{64}	—	February 26, 2014	Haleakala	Pan-STARRS 1	·	950 m	MPC · JPL
860571	2014 DV_{65}	—	February 26, 2014	Haleakala	Pan-STARRS 1	·	1.3 km	MPC · JPL
860572	2014 DC_{71}	—	February 26, 2014	Haleakala	Pan-STARRS 1	·	1.1 km	MPC · JPL
860573	2014 DG_{71}	—	August 30, 2011	Haleakala	Pan-STARRS 1	·	800 m	MPC · JPL
860574	2014 DO_{73}	—	December 18, 2009	Kitt Peak	Spacewatch	·	830 m	MPC · JPL
860575	2014 DO_{77}	—	October 25, 2005	Mount Lemmon	Mount Lemmon Survey	MAS	500 m	MPC · JPL
860576	2014 DB_{84}	—	February 25, 2014	Kitt Peak	Spacewatch	·	2.4 km	MPC · JPL
860577	2014 DR_{84}	—	December 28, 2005	Kitt Peak	Spacewatch	NYS	850 m	MPC · JPL
860578	2014 DX_{88}	—	February 26, 2014	Mount Lemmon	Mount Lemmon Survey	H	360 m	MPC · JPL
860579	2014 DQ_{89}	—	February 26, 2014	Mount Lemmon	Mount Lemmon Survey	H	370 m	MPC · JPL
860580	2014 DX_{91}	—	February 9, 2014	Kitt Peak	Spacewatch	MAS	590 m	MPC · JPL
860581	2014 DU_{93}	—	February 26, 2014	Mount Lemmon	Mount Lemmon Survey	·	530 m	MPC · JPL
860582	2014 DG_{94}	—	February 26, 2014	Haleakala	Pan-STARRS 1	V	390 m	MPC · JPL
860583	2014 DG_{96}	—	February 26, 2014	Haleakala	Pan-STARRS 1	MAS	620 m	MPC · JPL
860584	2014 DY_{96}	—	September 12, 2001	Kitt Peak	Deep Ecliptic Survey	EOS	1.3 km	MPC · JPL
860585	2014 DY_{100}	—	February 27, 2014	Mount Lemmon	Mount Lemmon Survey	·	1.3 km	MPC · JPL
860586	2014 DD_{103}	—	October 31, 2005	Kitt Peak	Spacewatch	·	860 m	MPC · JPL
860587	2014 DA_{104}	—	February 9, 2014	Haleakala	Pan-STARRS 1	PHO	770 m	MPC · JPL
860588	2014 DN_{104}	—	February 27, 2014	Mount Lemmon	Mount Lemmon Survey	·	480 m	MPC · JPL
860589	2014 DU_{106}	—	November 18, 2008	Kitt Peak	Spacewatch	MIS	1.8 km	MPC · JPL
860590	2014 DB_{109}	—	February 4, 2005	Mount Lemmon	Mount Lemmon Survey	·	1.2 km	MPC · JPL
860591	2014 DT_{110}	—	February 26, 2014	Haleakala	Pan-STARRS 1	AMO	400 m	MPC · JPL
860592	2014 DN_{111}	—	February 27, 2014	SATINO Remote	J. Jahn	·	1.2 km	MPC · JPL
860593	2014 DZ_{112}	—	February 28, 2014	Haleakala	Pan-STARRS 1	H	300 m	MPC · JPL
860594	2014 DN_{116}	—	February 26, 2007	Mount Lemmon	Mount Lemmon Survey	·	760 m	MPC · JPL
860595	2014 DS_{117}	—	October 27, 2008	Mount Lemmon	Mount Lemmon Survey	(5)	990 m	MPC · JPL
860596	2014 DW_{117}	—	March 23, 2003	Sacramento Peak	SDSS	·	820 m	MPC · JPL
860597	2014 DC_{120}	—	February 27, 2014	Haleakala	Pan-STARRS 1	EUN	930 m	MPC · JPL
860598	2014 DM_{121}	—	January 15, 2007	Mauna Kea	P. A. Wiegert	·	420 m	MPC · JPL
860599	2014 DS_{121}	—	February 28, 2014	Haleakala	Pan-STARRS 1	EUN	780 m	MPC · JPL
860600	2014 DM_{126}	—	October 11, 2012	Haleakala	Pan-STARRS 1	·	540 m	MPC · JPL

== 860601–860700 ==
back to top

Designation			Discovery			Properties		Ref
Permanent	Provisional	Named after	Date	Site	Discoverer(s)	Category	Diam.	Ref
860601	2014 DQ_{126}	—	February 28, 2014	Haleakala	Pan-STARRS 1	·	920 m	MPC · JPL
860602	2014 DS_{134}	—	February 28, 2014	Haleakala	Pan-STARRS 1	·	560 m	MPC · JPL
860603	2014 DA_{136}	—	February 28, 2014	Haleakala	Pan-STARRS 1	NYS	980 m	MPC · JPL
860604	2014 DH_{148}	—	March 12, 2010	Kitt Peak	Spacewatch	·	730 m	MPC · JPL
860605	2014 DF_{151}	—	February 26, 2014	Haleakala	Pan-STARRS 1	·	930 m	MPC · JPL
860606	2014 DH_{151}	—	February 15, 2010	Mount Lemmon	Mount Lemmon Survey	NYS	830 m	MPC · JPL
860607	2014 DX_{152}	—	February 28, 2014	Haleakala	Pan-STARRS 1	·	1.1 km	MPC · JPL
860608	2014 DQ_{154}	—	February 28, 2014	Haleakala	Pan-STARRS 1	V	440 m	MPC · JPL
860609	2014 DJ_{155}	—	April 9, 2005	Mount Lemmon	Mount Lemmon Survey	·	1.4 km	MPC · JPL
860610	2014 DN_{156}	—	February 16, 2015	Haleakala	Pan-STARRS 1	HNS	990 m	MPC · JPL
860611	2014 DV_{157}	—	February 26, 2014	Mount Lemmon	Mount Lemmon Survey	·	850 m	MPC · JPL
860612	2014 DX_{157}	—	February 25, 2014	Haleakala	Pan-STARRS 1	BRG	1.0 km	MPC · JPL
860613	2014 DE_{158}	—	October 9, 2004	Kitt Peak	Spacewatch	·	870 m	MPC · JPL
860614	2014 DF_{158}	—	February 26, 2014	Mount Lemmon	Mount Lemmon Survey	·	1.1 km	MPC · JPL
860615	2014 DL_{158}	—	February 27, 2014	Haleakala	Pan-STARRS 1	·	1.2 km	MPC · JPL
860616	2014 DT_{159}	—	February 28, 2014	Haleakala	Pan-STARRS 1	·	730 m	MPC · JPL
860617	2014 DU_{159}	—	February 28, 2014	Haleakala	Pan-STARRS 1	·	1 km	MPC · JPL
860618	2014 DJ_{161}	—	February 26, 2014	Haleakala	Pan-STARRS 1	·	600 m	MPC · JPL
860619	2014 DZ_{161}	—	February 27, 2014	Haleakala	Pan-STARRS 1	·	1.3 km	MPC · JPL
860620	2014 DK_{162}	—	February 26, 2014	Haleakala	Pan-STARRS 1	NYS	1.1 km	MPC · JPL
860621	2014 DN_{162}	—	February 26, 2014	Haleakala	Pan-STARRS 1	·	1.3 km	MPC · JPL
860622	2014 DC_{164}	—	February 28, 2014	Haleakala	Pan-STARRS 1	(895)	2.2 km	MPC · JPL
860623	2014 DH_{164}	—	February 26, 2014	Haleakala	Pan-STARRS 1	·	490 m	MPC · JPL
860624	2014 DY_{164}	—	February 27, 2014	Kitt Peak	Spacewatch	AGN	870 m	MPC · JPL
860625	2014 DG_{165}	—	February 24, 2014	Haleakala	Pan-STARRS 1	GEF	780 m	MPC · JPL
860626	2014 DH_{165}	—	February 28, 2014	Haleakala	Pan-STARRS 1	·	1.2 km	MPC · JPL
860627	2014 DK_{165}	—	February 28, 2014	Haleakala	Pan-STARRS 1	3:2	4.5 km	MPC · JPL
860628	2014 DO_{165}	—	February 18, 2014	Mount Lemmon	Mount Lemmon Survey	·	820 m	MPC · JPL
860629	2014 DT_{165}	—	February 28, 2014	Haleakala	Pan-STARRS 1	·	1.1 km	MPC · JPL
860630	2014 DX_{166}	—	February 26, 2014	Mount Lemmon	Mount Lemmon Survey	·	510 m	MPC · JPL
860631	2014 DT_{167}	—	February 26, 2014	Haleakala	Pan-STARRS 1	·	760 m	MPC · JPL
860632	2014 DZ_{167}	—	February 26, 2014	Haleakala	Pan-STARRS 1	EOS	1.3 km	MPC · JPL
860633	2014 DC_{168}	—	February 26, 2014	Haleakala	Pan-STARRS 1	·	500 m	MPC · JPL
860634	2014 DH_{169}	—	February 20, 2014	Mount Lemmon	Mount Lemmon Survey	NYS	890 m	MPC · JPL
860635	2014 DH_{170}	—	February 26, 2014	Haleakala	Pan-STARRS 1	·	1.6 km	MPC · JPL
860636	2014 DV_{174}	—	February 27, 2014	Mount Lemmon	Mount Lemmon Survey	MAS	520 m	MPC · JPL
860637	2014 DX_{174}	—	February 28, 2014	Haleakala	Pan-STARRS 1	·	810 m	MPC · JPL
860638	2014 DZ_{174}	—	February 26, 2014	Haleakala	Pan-STARRS 1	·	460 m	MPC · JPL
860639	2014 DB_{175}	—	February 28, 2014	Haleakala	Pan-STARRS 1	·	1.3 km	MPC · JPL
860640	2014 DD_{175}	—	February 28, 2014	Haleakala	Pan-STARRS 1	NAE	1.9 km	MPC · JPL
860641	2014 DL_{175}	—	November 21, 2009	Kitt Peak	Spacewatch	·	650 m	MPC · JPL
860642	2014 DM_{175}	—	February 18, 2014	Mount Lemmon	Mount Lemmon Survey	·	1.1 km	MPC · JPL
860643	2014 DR_{175}	—	February 28, 2014	Haleakala	Pan-STARRS 1	·	1.1 km	MPC · JPL
860644	2014 DW_{176}	—	February 26, 2014	Haleakala	Pan-STARRS 1	H	300 m	MPC · JPL
860645	2014 DY_{176}	—	February 22, 2014	Kitt Peak	Spacewatch	·	1.3 km	MPC · JPL
860646	2014 DL_{177}	—	February 26, 2014	Haleakala	Pan-STARRS 1	·	1.6 km	MPC · JPL
860647	2014 DZ_{177}	—	February 20, 2014	Haleakala	Pan-STARRS 1	(2076)	520 m	MPC · JPL
860648	2014 DL_{178}	—	February 27, 2014	Haleakala	Pan-STARRS 1	·	1.7 km	MPC · JPL
860649	2014 DN_{178}	—	February 19, 2014	Mount Lemmon	Mount Lemmon Survey	EUN	980 m	MPC · JPL
860650	2014 DS_{178}	—	February 27, 2014	Haleakala	Pan-STARRS 1	·	440 m	MPC · JPL
860651	2014 DC_{180}	—	November 9, 2009	Catalina	CSS	·	820 m	MPC · JPL
860652	2014 DU_{180}	—	February 24, 2014	Haleakala	Pan-STARRS 1	·	730 m	MPC · JPL
860653	2014 DO_{182}	—	February 26, 2014	Haleakala	Pan-STARRS 1	PHO	570 m	MPC · JPL
860654	2014 DP_{182}	—	February 26, 2014	Haleakala	Pan-STARRS 1	·	560 m	MPC · JPL
860655	2014 DC_{184}	—	February 19, 2014	Kitt Peak	Spacewatch	NYS	850 m	MPC · JPL
860656	2014 DX_{184}	—	February 19, 2014	Mount Lemmon	Mount Lemmon Survey	·	460 m	MPC · JPL
860657	2014 DA_{185}	—	February 20, 2014	Mount Lemmon	Mount Lemmon Survey	·	760 m	MPC · JPL
860658	2014 DC_{187}	—	February 26, 2014	Haleakala	Pan-STARRS 1	·	570 m	MPC · JPL
860659	2014 DG_{187}	—	February 28, 2014	Haleakala	Pan-STARRS 1	·	1.2 km	MPC · JPL
860660	2014 DA_{189}	—	February 19, 2014	Mount Lemmon	Mount Lemmon Survey	·	1.4 km	MPC · JPL
860661	2014 DK_{189}	—	February 28, 2014	Haleakala	Pan-STARRS 1	V	400 m	MPC · JPL
860662	2014 DM_{189}	—	March 14, 2007	Mount Lemmon	Mount Lemmon Survey	·	660 m	MPC · JPL
860663	2014 DO_{190}	—	February 26, 2014	Mount Lemmon	Mount Lemmon Survey	·	1.3 km	MPC · JPL
860664	2014 DU_{190}	—	February 13, 2007	Mount Lemmon	Mount Lemmon Survey	(2076)	510 m	MPC · JPL
860665	2014 DS_{194}	—	February 26, 2014	Haleakala	Pan-STARRS 1	GEF	800 m	MPC · JPL
860666	2014 DQ_{197}	—	February 26, 2014	Haleakala	Pan-STARRS 1	·	1.0 km	MPC · JPL
860667	2014 DC_{198}	—	February 9, 2005	Kitt Peak	Spacewatch	MRX	720 m	MPC · JPL
860668	2014 DJ_{200}	—	February 20, 2014	Mount Lemmon	Mount Lemmon Survey	·	820 m	MPC · JPL
860669	2014 DQ_{205}	—	August 28, 2016	Mount Lemmon	Mount Lemmon Survey	·	1.2 km	MPC · JPL
860670	2014 DF_{214}	—	February 28, 2014	Haleakala	Pan-STARRS 1	·	1.3 km	MPC · JPL
860671	2014 ES	—	February 9, 2014	Haleakala	Pan-STARRS 1	H	350 m	MPC · JPL
860672	2014 EX	—	May 11, 2003	Anderson Mesa	LONEOS	T_{j} (2.91)	2.1 km	MPC · JPL
860673	2014 EX_{2}	—	April 14, 2007	Kitt Peak	Spacewatch	NYS	670 m	MPC · JPL
860674	2014 EP_{5}	—	February 28, 2014	Haleakala	Pan-STARRS 1	·	700 m	MPC · JPL
860675	2014 EN_{8}	—	February 10, 2014	Mount Lemmon	Mount Lemmon Survey	·	1.5 km	MPC · JPL
860676	2014 ET_{14}	—	March 5, 2014	Haleakala	Pan-STARRS 1	PHO	700 m	MPC · JPL
860677	2014 ER_{16}	—	January 11, 2010	Mount Lemmon	Mount Lemmon Survey	·	820 m	MPC · JPL
860678	2014 ET_{20}	—	April 17, 2010	Kitt Peak	Spacewatch	·	1.1 km	MPC · JPL
860679	2014 EH_{25}	—	February 20, 2014	Mount Lemmon	Mount Lemmon Survey	·	1.7 km	MPC · JPL
860680	2014 EC_{28}	—	March 6, 2014	Kitt Peak	Spacewatch	H	320 m	MPC · JPL
860681	2014 EY_{30}	—	March 15, 2007	Kitt Peak	Spacewatch	·	650 m	MPC · JPL
860682	2014 EV_{31}	—	March 7, 2014	Kitt Peak	Spacewatch	JUN	980 m	MPC · JPL
860683	2014 EY_{31}	—	February 27, 2014	Kitt Peak	Spacewatch	·	740 m	MPC · JPL
860684	2014 EK_{36}	—	March 8, 2014	Mount Lemmon	Mount Lemmon Survey	EUN	850 m	MPC · JPL
860685	2014 ES_{36}	—	February 26, 2014	Oukaïmeden	M. Ory	·	1.2 km	MPC · JPL
860686	2014 EW_{36}	—	March 8, 2014	Mount Lemmon	Mount Lemmon Survey	·	1.6 km	MPC · JPL
860687	2014 EH_{41}	—	March 8, 2014	Mount Lemmon	Mount Lemmon Survey	·	1.1 km	MPC · JPL
860688	2014 EH_{42}	—	March 8, 2014	Mount Lemmon	Mount Lemmon Survey	GAL	1.0 km	MPC · JPL
860689	2014 EK_{45}	—	March 9, 2014	Haleakala	Pan-STARRS 1	·	1.1 km	MPC · JPL
860690	2014 ES_{48}	—	October 9, 2004	Kitt Peak	Spacewatch	·	1.1 km	MPC · JPL
860691	2014 EH_{54}	—	September 12, 2016	Haleakala	Pan-STARRS 1	·	1.2 km	MPC · JPL
860692	2014 EN_{56}	—	April 6, 2014	Mount Lemmon	Mount Lemmon Survey	·	1.2 km	MPC · JPL
860693	2014 EZ_{57}	—	March 24, 2014	Haleakala	Pan-STARRS 1	·	870 m	MPC · JPL
860694	2014 EY_{58}	—	November 24, 2012	Kitt Peak	Spacewatch	·	1.5 km	MPC · JPL
860695	2014 EM_{61}	—	March 2, 2014	Cerro Tololo	High Cadence Transient Survey	·	1.2 km	MPC · JPL
860696	2014 EX_{61}	—	February 26, 2014	Haleakala	Pan-STARRS 1	·	1.2 km	MPC · JPL
860697	2014 EH_{64}	—	March 2, 2014	Cerro Tololo	High Cadence Transient Survey	·	2.0 km	MPC · JPL
860698	2014 EN_{68}	—	September 11, 2015	Haleakala	Pan-STARRS 1	·	540 m	MPC · JPL
860699	2014 EY_{69}	—	October 13, 2016	Mount Lemmon	Mount Lemmon Survey	EUN	940 m	MPC · JPL
860700	2014 ED_{72}	—	February 28, 2014	Haleakala	Pan-STARRS 1	·	1.6 km	MPC · JPL

== 860701–860800 ==
back to top

Designation			Discovery			Properties		Ref
Permanent	Provisional	Named after	Date	Site	Discoverer(s)	Category	Diam.	Ref
860701	2014 EC_{73}	—	May 15, 2015	Haleakala	Pan-STARRS 1	ADE	1.6 km	MPC · JPL
860702	2014 EL_{77}	—	September 11, 2015	Haleakala	Pan-STARRS 1	·	480 m	MPC · JPL
860703	2014 EW_{78}	—	April 18, 2015	Cerro Tololo	DECam	L4	6.5 km	MPC · JPL
860704	2014 EX_{79}	—	September 4, 2011	Haleakala	Pan-STARRS 1	·	2.1 km	MPC · JPL
860705	2014 EA_{82}	—	November 20, 2016	Mount Lemmon	Mount Lemmon Survey	·	730 m	MPC · JPL
860706	2014 EM_{83}	—	September 26, 2016	Haleakala	Pan-STARRS 1	KOR	980 m	MPC · JPL
860707	2014 EX_{83}	—	November 2, 2016	Kitt Peak	Spacewatch	KON	1.6 km	MPC · JPL
860708	2014 EQ_{88}	—	January 23, 2014	Mount Lemmon	Mount Lemmon Survey	·	1.6 km	MPC · JPL
860709	2014 ET_{91}	—	September 22, 2009	Mount Lemmon	Mount Lemmon Survey	·	420 m	MPC · JPL
860710	2014 ED_{92}	—	November 20, 2009	Kitt Peak	Spacewatch	·	690 m	MPC · JPL
860711	2014 EF_{93}	—	October 23, 2012	Mount Lemmon	Mount Lemmon Survey	·	1.0 km	MPC · JPL
860712	2014 EU_{95}	—	October 26, 2005	Kitt Peak	Spacewatch	·	810 m	MPC · JPL
860713	2014 EB_{98}	—	October 16, 2003	Kitt Peak	Spacewatch	·	1.2 km	MPC · JPL
860714	2014 EZ_{99}	—	March 8, 2014	Calar Alto	S. Hellmich, G. Proffe	·	1.4 km	MPC · JPL
860715	2014 EY_{102}	—	July 13, 2016	Mount Lemmon	Mount Lemmon Survey	·	1.8 km	MPC · JPL
860716	2014 EK_{106}	—	September 27, 2011	Mount Lemmon	Mount Lemmon Survey	·	1.5 km	MPC · JPL
860717	2014 EM_{106}	—	September 13, 2007	Kitt Peak	Spacewatch	·	1.5 km	MPC · JPL
860718	2014 ER_{117}	—	February 28, 2014	Haleakala	Pan-STARRS 1	·	1.4 km	MPC · JPL
860719	2014 EA_{118}	—	November 3, 2011	Mount Lemmon	Mount Lemmon Survey	T_{j} (2.99) · 3:2	4.3 km	MPC · JPL
860720	2014 EC_{121}	—	August 2, 2016	Haleakala	Pan-STARRS 1	WIT	670 m	MPC · JPL
860721	2014 EO_{122}	—	February 28, 2014	Haleakala	Pan-STARRS 1	·	1.3 km	MPC · JPL
860722	2014 ES_{126}	—	August 13, 2012	Kitt Peak	Spacewatch	(1547)	1.3 km	MPC · JPL
860723	2014 ED_{132}	—	July 23, 2015	Haleakala	Pan-STARRS 1	·	480 m	MPC · JPL
860724	2014 ES_{132}	—	March 3, 2014	Cerro Tololo	High Cadence Transient Survey	·	960 m	MPC · JPL
860725	2014 EN_{133}	—	August 10, 2016	Haleakala	Pan-STARRS 1	·	1.4 km	MPC · JPL
860726	2014 EL_{134}	—	February 28, 2014	Haleakala	Pan-STARRS 1	·	500 m	MPC · JPL
860727	2014 EK_{135}	—	May 1, 2006	Kitt Peak	Spacewatch	·	1.1 km	MPC · JPL
860728	2014 EO_{136}	—	April 18, 2015	Cerro Tololo	DECam	L4	5.0 km	MPC · JPL
860729	2014 EX_{136}	—	August 13, 2012	Haleakala	Pan-STARRS 1	·	560 m	MPC · JPL
860730	2014 EM_{138}	—	March 3, 2014	Cerro Tololo	High Cadence Transient Survey	·	1.0 km	MPC · JPL
860731	2014 EM_{140}	—	December 6, 2008	Kitt Peak	Spacewatch	·	1.3 km	MPC · JPL
860732	2014 EP_{144}	—	January 28, 2014	Kitt Peak	Spacewatch	·	1.1 km	MPC · JPL
860733	2014 EM_{146}	—	February 28, 2014	Haleakala	Pan-STARRS 1	·	450 m	MPC · JPL
860734	2014 EZ_{147}	—	March 3, 2014	Cerro Tololo	High Cadence Transient Survey	·	1.0 km	MPC · JPL
860735	2014 EC_{149}	—	September 25, 2006	Kitt Peak	Spacewatch	·	1.5 km	MPC · JPL
860736	2014 EG_{151}	—	March 4, 2014	Cerro Tololo	High Cadence Transient Survey	H	290 m	MPC · JPL
860737	2014 EE_{152}	—	September 25, 2009	Kitt Peak	Spacewatch	L4	6.1 km	MPC · JPL
860738	2014 EN_{152}	—	October 2, 2016	Mount Lemmon	Mount Lemmon Survey	·	770 m	MPC · JPL
860739	2014 EO_{152}	—	December 29, 2008	Kitt Peak	Spacewatch	·	1.1 km	MPC · JPL
860740	2014 EM_{155}	—	October 18, 2012	Haleakala	Pan-STARRS 1	·	470 m	MPC · JPL
860741	2014 EV_{159}	—	October 18, 2012	Haleakala	Pan-STARRS 1	V	440 m	MPC · JPL
860742	2014 EM_{164}	—	February 26, 2014	Haleakala	Pan-STARRS 1	·	470 m	MPC · JPL
860743	2014 EV_{169}	—	January 27, 2007	Kitt Peak	Spacewatch	·	500 m	MPC · JPL
860744	2014 ET_{171}	—	August 29, 2016	Mount Lemmon	Mount Lemmon Survey	·	1.2 km	MPC · JPL
860745	2014 EE_{173}	—	August 1, 2015	Haleakala	Pan-STARRS 1	·	1.1 km	MPC · JPL
860746	2014 EJ_{174}	—	August 10, 2016	Haleakala	Pan-STARRS 1	·	1.3 km	MPC · JPL
860747	2014 EW_{186}	—	February 28, 2014	Haleakala	Pan-STARRS 1	·	840 m	MPC · JPL
860748	2014 EP_{193}	—	October 12, 2016	Haleakala	Pan-STARRS 1	·	1.2 km	MPC · JPL
860749	2014 EE_{194}	—	September 26, 2016	Haleakala	Pan-STARRS 1	HOF	1.8 km	MPC · JPL
860750	2014 ER_{194}	—	October 13, 1999	Sacramento Peak	SDSS	·	870 m	MPC · JPL
860751	2014 ER_{198}	—	February 28, 2014	Haleakala	Pan-STARRS 1	·	1.2 km	MPC · JPL
860752	2014 EZ_{200}	—	September 6, 2008	Mount Lemmon	Mount Lemmon Survey	·	520 m	MPC · JPL
860753	2014 EF_{202}	—	July 24, 2015	Haleakala	Pan-STARRS 1	EUN	800 m	MPC · JPL
860754	2014 ET_{203}	—	March 5, 2014	Cerro Tololo	High Cadence Transient Survey	·	2.0 km	MPC · JPL
860755	2014 EY_{205}	—	November 21, 2017	Haleakala	Pan-STARRS 1	JUN	550 m	MPC · JPL
860756	2014 EA_{206}	—	August 28, 2016	Mount Lemmon	Mount Lemmon Survey	·	950 m	MPC · JPL
860757	2014 EQ_{208}	—	June 27, 2015	Haleakala	Pan-STARRS 1	·	770 m	MPC · JPL
860758	2014 EK_{212}	—	September 4, 2008	Kitt Peak	Spacewatch	·	680 m	MPC · JPL
860759	2014 ED_{214}	—	February 28, 2014	Haleakala	Pan-STARRS 1	·	820 m	MPC · JPL
860760	2014 ET_{214}	—	February 28, 2014	Haleakala	Pan-STARRS 1	·	1.2 km	MPC · JPL
860761	2014 EH_{218}	—	June 18, 2015	Haleakala	Pan-STARRS 1	·	2.0 km	MPC · JPL
860762	2014 EX_{218}	—	July 9, 2015	Haleakala	Pan-STARRS 1	·	1.2 km	MPC · JPL
860763	2014 EP_{220}	—	September 8, 2011	Kitt Peak	Spacewatch	·	2.0 km	MPC · JPL
860764	2014 EV_{222}	—	September 20, 2011	Haleakala	Pan-STARRS 1	AGN	840 m	MPC · JPL
860765	2014 ES_{225}	—	September 12, 2001	Kitt Peak	Spacewatch	·	1.3 km	MPC · JPL
860766	2014 EF_{230}	—	October 18, 2007	Mount Lemmon	Mount Lemmon Survey	·	1.4 km	MPC · JPL
860767	2014 EG_{230}	—	July 11, 2016	Haleakala	Pan-STARRS 1	·	2.2 km	MPC · JPL
860768	2014 ET_{230}	—	March 5, 2014	Cerro Tololo	High Cadence Transient Survey	·	1.2 km	MPC · JPL
860769	2014 EM_{231}	—	July 3, 2016	Mount Lemmon	Mount Lemmon Survey	T_{j} (2.99) · 3:2	3.8 km	MPC · JPL
860770	2014 EF_{240}	—	December 6, 2016	Mount Lemmon	Mount Lemmon Survey	·	890 m	MPC · JPL
860771	2014 EN_{242}	—	August 3, 2016	Haleakala	Pan-STARRS 1	·	1.1 km	MPC · JPL
860772	2014 ES_{242}	—	May 20, 2015	Cerro Tololo	DECam	·	690 m	MPC · JPL
860773	2014 EG_{251}	—	March 10, 2014	Mount Lemmon	Mount Lemmon Survey	·	1.4 km	MPC · JPL
860774	2014 EH_{251}	—	March 8, 2014	Mount Lemmon	Mount Lemmon Survey	·	1.0 km	MPC · JPL
860775	2014 EP_{251}	—	March 9, 2014	Haleakala	Pan-STARRS 1	PHO	620 m	MPC · JPL
860776	2014 EQ_{251}	—	March 10, 2014	Mount Lemmon	Mount Lemmon Survey	·	900 m	MPC · JPL
860777	2014 ET_{251}	—	February 25, 2014	Kitt Peak	Spacewatch	·	1.4 km	MPC · JPL
860778	2014 EX_{251}	—	March 6, 2014	Mount Lemmon	Mount Lemmon Survey	·	1.3 km	MPC · JPL
860779	2014 EV_{255}	—	March 8, 2014	Mount Lemmon	Mount Lemmon Survey	·	790 m	MPC · JPL
860780	2014 EZ_{255}	—	February 22, 2014	Mount Lemmon	Mount Lemmon Survey	·	520 m	MPC · JPL
860781	2014 EP_{257}	—	March 13, 2014	Mount Lemmon	Mount Lemmon Survey	·	1.4 km	MPC · JPL
860782	2014 ET_{257}	—	March 13, 2014	Kitt Peak	Spacewatch	HNS	790 m	MPC · JPL
860783	2014 EU_{257}	—	March 12, 2014	Mount Lemmon	Mount Lemmon Survey	·	1.3 km	MPC · JPL
860784	2014 EB_{258}	—	March 7, 2014	Mount Lemmon	Mount Lemmon Survey	·	1.1 km	MPC · JPL
860785	2014 EP_{259}	—	March 7, 2014	Kitt Peak	Spacewatch	·	500 m	MPC · JPL
860786	2014 EP_{262}	—	August 30, 2011	Kachina	Hobart, J.	·	1.1 km	MPC · JPL
860787	2014 FW_{3}	—	March 20, 2014	Mount Lemmon	Mount Lemmon Survey	BRG	1.1 km	MPC · JPL
860788	2014 FS_{4}	—	February 28, 2014	Mount Lemmon	Mount Lemmon Survey	·	520 m	MPC · JPL
860789	2014 FP_{7}	—	February 28, 2014	Haleakala	Pan-STARRS 1	·	310 m	MPC · JPL
860790	2014 FH_{9}	—	February 26, 2014	Haleakala	Pan-STARRS 1	·	770 m	MPC · JPL
860791	2014 FR_{10}	—	March 20, 2014	Mount Lemmon	Mount Lemmon Survey	·	1.9 km	MPC · JPL
860792	2014 FY_{10}	—	March 13, 2010	Mount Lemmon	Mount Lemmon Survey	·	1.0 km	MPC · JPL
860793	2014 FT_{17}	—	February 26, 2014	Haleakala	Pan-STARRS 1	·	580 m	MPC · JPL
860794	2014 FL_{21}	—	February 28, 2014	Haleakala	Pan-STARRS 1	·	1.2 km	MPC · JPL
860795	2014 FP_{22}	—	March 23, 2014	Mount Lemmon	Mount Lemmon Survey	HNS	750 m	MPC · JPL
860796	2014 FE_{23}	—	March 23, 2014	Mount Lemmon	Mount Lemmon Survey	·	850 m	MPC · JPL
860797	2014 FO_{23}	—	February 28, 2014	Haleakala	Pan-STARRS 1	·	810 m	MPC · JPL
860798	2014 FR_{25}	—	February 28, 2014	Haleakala	Pan-STARRS 1	·	640 m	MPC · JPL
860799	2014 FX_{25}	—	February 26, 2014	Haleakala	Pan-STARRS 1	H	300 m	MPC · JPL
860800	2014 FG_{30}	—	March 23, 2014	Mount Lemmon	Mount Lemmon Survey	L4	5.9 km	MPC · JPL

== 860801–860900 ==
back to top

Designation			Discovery			Properties		Ref
Permanent	Provisional	Named after	Date	Site	Discoverer(s)	Category	Diam.	Ref
860801	2014 FO_{31}	—	March 12, 2007	Mount Lemmon	Mount Lemmon Survey	·	460 m	MPC · JPL
860802	2014 FB_{34}	—	March 26, 2014	Mount Lemmon	Mount Lemmon Survey	H	230 m	MPC · JPL
860803	2014 FD_{34}	—	December 25, 2005	Kitt Peak	Spacewatch	MAS	580 m	MPC · JPL
860804	2014 FB_{43}	—	February 1, 2006	Mount Lemmon	Mount Lemmon Survey	·	770 m	MPC · JPL
860805	2014 FH_{52}	—	February 24, 2014	Haleakala	Pan-STARRS 1	·	740 m	MPC · JPL
860806	2014 FJ_{53}	—	March 28, 2014	Mount Lemmon	Mount Lemmon Survey	·	1.3 km	MPC · JPL
860807	2014 FV_{72}	—	March 25, 2014	Kitt Peak	Spacewatch	H	290 m	MPC · JPL
860808	2014 FX_{72}	—	October 27, 2005	Mount Lemmon	Mount Lemmon Survey	H	350 m	MPC · JPL
860809	2014 FV_{73}	—	March 24, 2014	Haleakala	Pan-STARRS 1	·	650 m	MPC · JPL
860810	2014 FQ_{74}	—	March 28, 2014	Mount Lemmon	Mount Lemmon Survey	·	680 m	MPC · JPL
860811	2014 FM_{77}	—	March 20, 2014	Haleakala	Pan-STARRS 1	H	460 m	MPC · JPL
860812	2014 FZ_{77}	—	March 26, 2014	Mount Lemmon	Mount Lemmon Survey	·	1.7 km	MPC · JPL
860813	2014 FO_{78}	—	March 23, 2014	Catalina	CSS	H	460 m	MPC · JPL
860814	2014 FS_{78}	—	November 21, 2009	Kitt Peak	Spacewatch	·	500 m	MPC · JPL
860815	2014 FV_{78}	—	March 31, 2014	Mount Lemmon	Mount Lemmon Survey	·	500 m	MPC · JPL
860816	2014 FG_{79}	—	March 28, 2014	Mount Lemmon	Mount Lemmon Survey	·	1.3 km	MPC · JPL
860817	2014 FL_{79}	—	March 22, 2014	Mount Lemmon	Mount Lemmon Survey	·	1.8 km	MPC · JPL
860818	2014 FR_{79}	—	October 18, 2015	Haleakala	Pan-STARRS 1	·	910 m	MPC · JPL
860819	2014 FU_{79}	—	July 29, 2017	Haleakala	Pan-STARRS 1	LIX	2.3 km	MPC · JPL
860820	2014 FH_{80}	—	July 25, 2015	Haleakala	Pan-STARRS 1	H	350 m	MPC · JPL
860821	2014 FU_{80}	—	March 24, 2014	Haleakala	Pan-STARRS 1	·	1.5 km	MPC · JPL
860822	2014 FH_{83}	—	March 31, 2014	Mount Lemmon	Mount Lemmon Survey	·	2.0 km	MPC · JPL
860823	2014 FR_{83}	—	March 24, 2014	Haleakala	Pan-STARRS 1	·	1.5 km	MPC · JPL
860824	2014 FV_{83}	—	March 24, 2014	Haleakala	Pan-STARRS 1	HOF	1.9 km	MPC · JPL
860825	2014 FV_{84}	—	March 28, 2014	Mount Lemmon	Mount Lemmon Survey	·	720 m	MPC · JPL
860826	2014 FY_{85}	—	March 20, 2014	Mount Lemmon	Mount Lemmon Survey	V	430 m	MPC · JPL
860827	2014 FQ_{86}	—	March 28, 2014	Mount Lemmon	Mount Lemmon Survey	V	410 m	MPC · JPL
860828	2014 FS_{86}	—	March 28, 2014	Mount Lemmon	Mount Lemmon Survey	·	500 m	MPC · JPL
860829	2014 FW_{86}	—	March 24, 2014	Haleakala	Pan-STARRS 1	·	500 m	MPC · JPL
860830	2014 FG_{88}	—	March 29, 2014	Mount Lemmon	Mount Lemmon Survey	·	460 m	MPC · JPL
860831	2014 FZ_{88}	—	June 16, 2007	Kitt Peak	Spacewatch	·	870 m	MPC · JPL
860832	2014 FH_{89}	—	March 28, 2014	Mount Lemmon	Mount Lemmon Survey	·	680 m	MPC · JPL
860833	2014 FY_{90}	—	March 20, 2014	Mount Lemmon	Mount Lemmon Survey	·	450 m	MPC · JPL
860834	2014 GA_{1}	—	March 28, 2014	Mount Lemmon	Mount Lemmon Survey	·	1.6 km	MPC · JPL
860835	2014 GD_{6}	—	October 23, 2012	Haleakala	Pan-STARRS 1	·	1.2 km	MPC · JPL
860836	2014 GK_{6}	—	February 22, 2014	Mount Lemmon	Mount Lemmon Survey	·	910 m	MPC · JPL
860837	2014 GT_{6}	—	April 1, 2014	Mount Lemmon	Mount Lemmon Survey	·	590 m	MPC · JPL
860838	2014 GY_{8}	—	February 26, 2014	Haleakala	Pan-STARRS 1	·	1.1 km	MPC · JPL
860839	2014 GR_{9}	—	February 26, 2014	Haleakala	Pan-STARRS 1	·	1.0 km	MPC · JPL
860840	2014 GB_{10}	—	February 28, 2014	Haleakala	Pan-STARRS 1	DOR	1.7 km	MPC · JPL
860841	2014 GN_{11}	—	April 2, 2014	Mount Lemmon	Mount Lemmon Survey	·	1.3 km	MPC · JPL
860842	2014 GP_{11}	—	April 10, 2000	Kitt Peak	M. W. Buie	·	550 m	MPC · JPL
860843	2014 GZ_{11}	—	December 5, 2012	Mount Lemmon	Mount Lemmon Survey	·	1.2 km	MPC · JPL
860844	2014 GL_{13}	—	April 2, 2014	Mount Lemmon	Mount Lemmon Survey	·	1.0 km	MPC · JPL
860845	2014 GT_{15}	—	February 28, 2014	Haleakala	Pan-STARRS 1	·	550 m	MPC · JPL
860846	2014 GW_{16}	—	August 29, 2006	Catalina	CSS	·	1.1 km	MPC · JPL
860847	2014 GP_{18}	—	February 27, 2014	Mount Lemmon	Mount Lemmon Survey	(18466)	1.9 km	MPC · JPL
860848	2014 GA_{19}	—	February 13, 2007	Mount Lemmon	Mount Lemmon Survey	·	460 m	MPC · JPL
860849	2014 GL_{20}	—	April 4, 2014	Mount Lemmon	Mount Lemmon Survey	·	490 m	MPC · JPL
860850	2014 GW_{21}	—	May 8, 2011	Mount Lemmon	Mount Lemmon Survey	·	500 m	MPC · JPL
860851	2014 GJ_{24}	—	April 4, 2014	Mount Lemmon	Mount Lemmon Survey	GEF	870 m	MPC · JPL
860852	2014 GO_{24}	—	April 4, 2014	Mount Lemmon	Mount Lemmon Survey	·	790 m	MPC · JPL
860853	2014 GJ_{25}	—	September 30, 2006	Mount Lemmon	Mount Lemmon Survey	·	1.8 km	MPC · JPL
860854	2014 GK_{27}	—	April 4, 2014	Mount Lemmon	Mount Lemmon Survey	·	530 m	MPC · JPL
860855	2014 GV_{30}	—	April 4, 2014	Haleakala	Pan-STARRS 1	·	1.4 km	MPC · JPL
860856	2014 GR_{34}	—	April 5, 2014	Haleakala	Pan-STARRS 1	·	360 m	MPC · JPL
860857	2014 GC_{42}	—	February 22, 2007	Kitt Peak	Spacewatch	·	490 m	MPC · JPL
860858	2014 GJ_{49}	—	April 9, 2014	Haleakala	Pan-STARRS 1	·	390 m	MPC · JPL
860859	2014 GT_{55}	—	April 5, 2014	Haleakala	Pan-STARRS 1	MAS	510 m	MPC · JPL
860860	2014 GW_{55}	—	April 5, 2014	Haleakala	Pan-STARRS 1	·	850 m	MPC · JPL
860861	2014 GH_{58}	—	April 7, 2014	Kitt Peak	Spacewatch	·	970 m	MPC · JPL
860862	2014 GQ_{58}	—	April 5, 2014	Haleakala	Pan-STARRS 1	AEO	780 m	MPC · JPL
860863	2014 GX_{58}	—	February 1, 2009	Mount Lemmon	Mount Lemmon Survey	·	1.2 km	MPC · JPL
860864	2014 GN_{60}	—	April 4, 2014	Haleakala	Pan-STARRS 1	·	1.5 km	MPC · JPL
860865	2014 GG_{65}	—	March 29, 2014	Kitt Peak	Spacewatch	·	520 m	MPC · JPL
860866	2014 GZ_{65}	—	April 9, 2014	Haleakala	Pan-STARRS 1	·	1.2 km	MPC · JPL
860867	2014 GR_{67}	—	April 4, 2014	Kitt Peak	Spacewatch	·	1.2 km	MPC · JPL
860868	2014 GS_{67}	—	April 5, 2014	Haleakala	Pan-STARRS 1	·	500 m	MPC · JPL
860869	2014 GU_{67}	—	April 5, 2014	Haleakala	Pan-STARRS 1	·	440 m	MPC · JPL
860870	2014 GP_{68}	—	April 8, 2014	Haleakala	Pan-STARRS 1	·	1.3 km	MPC · JPL
860871	2014 GK_{69}	—	April 5, 2014	Haleakala	Pan-STARRS 1	·	1.1 km	MPC · JPL
860872	2014 GN_{69}	—	April 5, 2014	Haleakala	Pan-STARRS 1	·	790 m	MPC · JPL
860873	2014 GW_{69}	—	April 5, 2014	Haleakala	Pan-STARRS 1	·	540 m	MPC · JPL
860874	2014 GF_{70}	—	April 10, 2014	Haleakala	Pan-STARRS 1	·	1.5 km	MPC · JPL
860875	2014 GM_{70}	—	April 4, 2014	Haleakala	Pan-STARRS 1	H	290 m	MPC · JPL
860876	2014 GQ_{71}	—	April 5, 2014	Haleakala	Pan-STARRS 1	·	920 m	MPC · JPL
860877	2014 GT_{71}	—	April 5, 2014	Haleakala	Pan-STARRS 1	·	1.2 km	MPC · JPL
860878	2014 GY_{71}	—	April 5, 2014	Haleakala	Pan-STARRS 1	·	1.2 km	MPC · JPL
860879	2014 GF_{72}	—	April 4, 2014	Haleakala	Pan-STARRS 1	·	1.3 km	MPC · JPL
860880	2014 GK_{72}	—	April 5, 2014	Haleakala	Pan-STARRS 1	·	1.5 km	MPC · JPL
860881	2014 GS_{72}	—	April 5, 2014	Haleakala	Pan-STARRS 1	·	760 m	MPC · JPL
860882	2014 GG_{73}	—	April 4, 2014	Haleakala	Pan-STARRS 1	·	500 m	MPC · JPL
860883	2014 GL_{73}	—	August 30, 2011	Haleakala	Pan-STARRS 1	·	440 m	MPC · JPL
860884	2014 GE_{74}	—	February 28, 2014	Haleakala	Pan-STARRS 1	·	500 m	MPC · JPL
860885	2014 GW_{74}	—	April 9, 2014	Kitt Peak	Spacewatch	(2076)	540 m	MPC · JPL
860886	2014 GX_{75}	—	April 5, 2014	Haleakala	Pan-STARRS 1	·	1.4 km	MPC · JPL
860887	2014 GU_{78}	—	April 5, 2014	Haleakala	Pan-STARRS 1	·	620 m	MPC · JPL
860888	2014 GY_{78}	—	April 5, 2014	Haleakala	Pan-STARRS 1	PHO	570 m	MPC · JPL
860889	2014 GR_{80}	—	April 5, 2014	Haleakala	Pan-STARRS 1	·	540 m	MPC · JPL
860890	2014 GS_{80}	—	April 5, 2014	Haleakala	Pan-STARRS 1	·	420 m	MPC · JPL
860891	2014 GM_{82}	—	April 4, 2014	Haleakala	Pan-STARRS 1	·	680 m	MPC · JPL
860892	2014 GN_{82}	—	April 1, 2014	Mount Lemmon	Mount Lemmon Survey	·	770 m	MPC · JPL
860893	2014 GQ_{82}	—	December 10, 2009	Mount Lemmon	Mount Lemmon Survey	·	610 m	MPC · JPL
860894	2014 GY_{82}	—	April 10, 2014	Haleakala	Pan-STARRS 1	·	700 m	MPC · JPL
860895	2014 GC_{83}	—	April 4, 2014	Haleakala	Pan-STARRS 1	·	530 m	MPC · JPL
860896	2014 GL_{83}	—	April 1, 2014	Mount Lemmon	Mount Lemmon Survey	V	450 m	MPC · JPL
860897	2014 GR_{84}	—	April 2, 2014	Kitt Peak	Spacewatch	·	470 m	MPC · JPL
860898	2014 GS_{84}	—	April 5, 2014	Haleakala	Pan-STARRS 1	·	370 m	MPC · JPL
860899	2014 GX_{84}	—	April 5, 2014	Haleakala	Pan-STARRS 1	·	570 m	MPC · JPL
860900	2014 GA_{85}	—	April 5, 2014	Haleakala	Pan-STARRS 1	V	390 m	MPC · JPL

== 860901–861000 ==
back to top

Designation			Discovery			Properties		Ref
Permanent	Provisional	Named after	Date	Site	Discoverer(s)	Category	Diam.	Ref
860901	2014 GC_{85}	—	April 1, 2014	Kitt Peak	Spacewatch	·	560 m	MPC · JPL
860902	2014 GZ_{85}	—	April 6, 2014	Mount Lemmon	Mount Lemmon Survey	T_{j} (2.94) · 3:2	4.5 km	MPC · JPL
860903	2014 GQ_{87}	—	April 5, 2014	Haleakala	Pan-STARRS 1	(1118)	2.1 km	MPC · JPL
860904	2014 GR_{88}	—	April 5, 2014	Haleakala	Pan-STARRS 1	·	1.4 km	MPC · JPL
860905	2014 GL_{90}	—	April 5, 2014	Haleakala	Pan-STARRS 1	·	1.3 km	MPC · JPL
860906	2014 GO_{90}	—	April 9, 2010	Mount Lemmon	Mount Lemmon Survey	EUN	960 m	MPC · JPL
860907	2014 GF_{91}	—	April 5, 2014	Haleakala	Pan-STARRS 1	·	630 m	MPC · JPL
860908	2014 GL_{93}	—	April 5, 2014	Haleakala	Pan-STARRS 1	·	540 m	MPC · JPL
860909	2014 GO_{97}	—	February 20, 2009	Kitt Peak	Spacewatch	·	1.3 km	MPC · JPL
860910	2014 GH_{98}	—	April 7, 2014	Mount Lemmon	Mount Lemmon Survey	·	700 m	MPC · JPL
860911	2014 GW_{98}	—	April 4, 2014	Haleakala	Pan-STARRS 1	·	1.8 km	MPC · JPL
860912	2014 GX_{98}	—	April 4, 2014	Mount Lemmon	Mount Lemmon Survey	·	1.9 km	MPC · JPL
860913	2014 HP_{1}	—	April 5, 2014	Haleakala	Pan-STARRS 1	·	1.2 km	MPC · JPL
860914	2014 HS_{2}	—	April 1, 2014	Kitt Peak	Spacewatch	H	350 m	MPC · JPL
860915	2014 HJ_{3}	—	April 20, 2014	Mount Lemmon	Mount Lemmon Survey	H	450 m	MPC · JPL
860916	2014 HU_{3}	—	March 27, 2014	Haleakala	Pan-STARRS 1	·	510 m	MPC · JPL
860917	2014 HF_{7}	—	October 20, 2007	Mount Lemmon	Mount Lemmon Survey	HNS	980 m	MPC · JPL
860918	2014 HX_{10}	—	April 5, 2014	Haleakala	Pan-STARRS 1	MAS	570 m	MPC · JPL
860919	2014 HD_{11}	—	February 22, 2014	Mount Lemmon	Mount Lemmon Survey	JUN	830 m	MPC · JPL
860920	2014 HM_{11}	—	May 11, 2007	Mount Lemmon	Mount Lemmon Survey	NYS	660 m	MPC · JPL
860921	2014 HU_{11}	—	April 21, 2014	Kitt Peak	Spacewatch	·	940 m	MPC · JPL
860922	2014 HT_{17}	—	April 5, 2014	Haleakala	Pan-STARRS 1	·	1.1 km	MPC · JPL
860923	2014 HT_{20}	—	April 5, 2014	Haleakala	Pan-STARRS 1	·	1.1 km	MPC · JPL
860924	2014 HB_{22}	—	April 4, 2014	Haleakala	Pan-STARRS 1	·	1.0 km	MPC · JPL
860925	2014 HB_{27}	—	April 23, 2014	Cerro Tololo-DECam	DECam	·	650 m	MPC · JPL
860926	2014 HN_{32}	—	April 24, 2014	Mount Lemmon	Mount Lemmon Survey	GAL	1.4 km	MPC · JPL
860927	2014 HG_{33}	—	April 24, 2014	Mount Lemmon	Mount Lemmon Survey	·	490 m	MPC · JPL
860928	2014 HF_{36}	—	April 2, 2014	Mount Lemmon	Mount Lemmon Survey	H	370 m	MPC · JPL
860929	2014 HH_{39}	—	April 24, 2014	Mount Lemmon	Mount Lemmon Survey	·	1.0 km	MPC · JPL
860930	2014 HM_{41}	—	March 7, 2014	Kitt Peak	Spacewatch	·	1.2 km	MPC · JPL
860931	2014 HB_{42}	—	April 1, 2014	Kitt Peak	Spacewatch	·	530 m	MPC · JPL
860932	2014 HR_{42}	—	April 23, 2014	Cerro Tololo-DECam	DECam	·	450 m	MPC · JPL
860933	2014 HF_{48}	—	April 4, 2014	Haleakala	Pan-STARRS 1	3:2	4.0 km	MPC · JPL
860934	2014 HL_{50}	—	January 27, 2017	Mount Lemmon	Mount Lemmon Survey	·	470 m	MPC · JPL
860935	2014 HA_{51}	—	April 23, 2014	Cerro Tololo-DECam	DECam	·	1.0 km	MPC · JPL
860936	2014 HE_{51}	—	March 31, 2014	Mount Lemmon	Mount Lemmon Survey	·	1.5 km	MPC · JPL
860937	2014 HO_{52}	—	April 23, 2014	Cerro Tololo-DECam	DECam	·	1.2 km	MPC · JPL
860938	2014 HC_{56}	—	April 23, 2014	Cerro Tololo-DECam	DECam	·	1.3 km	MPC · JPL
860939	2014 HZ_{56}	—	April 2, 2014	Kitt Peak	Spacewatch	NYS	820 m	MPC · JPL
860940	2014 HC_{60}	—	April 5, 2014	Haleakala	Pan-STARRS 1	·	1.1 km	MPC · JPL
860941	2014 HX_{61}	—	April 23, 2014	Cerro Tololo-DECam	DECam	·	760 m	MPC · JPL
860942	2014 HY_{62}	—	November 2, 2007	Mount Lemmon	Mount Lemmon Survey	·	1.2 km	MPC · JPL
860943	2014 HR_{66}	—	October 8, 2012	Haleakala	Pan-STARRS 1	(1547)	1.0 km	MPC · JPL
860944	2014 HK_{69}	—	April 5, 2014	Haleakala	Pan-STARRS 1	·	1.3 km	MPC · JPL
860945	2014 HX_{70}	—	April 23, 2014	Cerro Tololo-DECam	DECam	·	1.1 km	MPC · JPL
860946	2014 HS_{73}	—	December 23, 2012	Haleakala	Pan-STARRS 1	·	1.0 km	MPC · JPL
860947	2014 HY_{74}	—	October 20, 2011	Mount Lemmon	Mount Lemmon Survey	KOR	850 m	MPC · JPL
860948	2014 HJ_{76}	—	April 23, 2014	Cerro Tololo-DECam	DECam	L4	5.1 km	MPC · JPL
860949	2014 HU_{76}	—	April 5, 2014	Haleakala	Pan-STARRS 1	·	1.3 km	MPC · JPL
860950	2014 HX_{76}	—	April 23, 2014	Cerro Tololo-DECam	DECam	·	1.4 km	MPC · JPL
860951	2014 HO_{78}	—	November 7, 2012	Haleakala	Pan-STARRS 1	·	790 m	MPC · JPL
860952	2014 HR_{80}	—	October 8, 2015	Haleakala	Pan-STARRS 1	·	450 m	MPC · JPL
860953	2014 HG_{90}	—	April 23, 2014	Cerro Tololo-DECam	DECam	·	2.3 km	MPC · JPL
860954	2014 HM_{90}	—	November 18, 2015	Kitt Peak	Spacewatch	·	720 m	MPC · JPL
860955	2014 HS_{90}	—	April 23, 2014	Cerro Tololo-DECam	DECam	·	1.5 km	MPC · JPL
860956	2014 HC_{91}	—	April 23, 2014	Cerro Tololo-DECam	DECam	·	490 m	MPC · JPL
860957	2014 HE_{92}	—	March 2, 2009	Kitt Peak	Spacewatch	·	1.2 km	MPC · JPL
860958	2014 HR_{92}	—	November 17, 2011	Mount Lemmon	Mount Lemmon Survey	EOS	1.2 km	MPC · JPL
860959	2014 HR_{94}	—	December 9, 2012	Mount Lemmon	Mount Lemmon Survey	·	570 m	MPC · JPL
860960	2014 HE_{98}	—	April 4, 2014	Haleakala	Pan-STARRS 1	·	490 m	MPC · JPL
860961	2014 HL_{99}	—	April 5, 2014	Haleakala	Pan-STARRS 1	NYS	850 m	MPC · JPL
860962	2014 HO_{99}	—	April 23, 2014	Cerro Tololo-DECam	DECam	·	480 m	MPC · JPL
860963	2014 HR_{99}	—	April 23, 2014	Cerro Tololo-DECam	DECam	·	460 m	MPC · JPL
860964	2014 HU_{99}	—	January 2, 2009	Kitt Peak	Spacewatch	·	890 m	MPC · JPL
860965	2014 HF_{101}	—	April 23, 2014	Cerro Tololo-DECam	DECam	·	770 m	MPC · JPL
860966	2014 HZ_{102}	—	September 2, 2011	Haleakala	Pan-STARRS 1	·	470 m	MPC · JPL
860967	2014 HE_{104}	—	March 13, 2013	Kitt Peak	Research and Education Collaborative Occultation Network	·	2.8 km	MPC · JPL
860968	2014 HV_{105}	—	April 23, 2014	Cerro Tololo-DECam	DECam	·	1.9 km	MPC · JPL
860969	2014 HD_{106}	—	April 4, 2014	Haleakala	Pan-STARRS 1	·	910 m	MPC · JPL
860970	2014 HV_{106}	—	January 10, 2014	Haleakala	Pan-STARRS 1	·	980 m	MPC · JPL
860971	2014 HO_{109}	—	October 30, 2007	Mount Lemmon	Mount Lemmon Survey	H	320 m	MPC · JPL
860972	2014 HV_{113}	—	November 5, 2016	Haleakala	Pan-STARRS 1	·	1.3 km	MPC · JPL
860973	2014 HD_{116}	—	April 23, 2014	Cerro Tololo-DECam	DECam	·	1.9 km	MPC · JPL
860974	2014 HE_{118}	—	October 8, 2015	Haleakala	Pan-STARRS 1	·	570 m	MPC · JPL
860975	2014 HT_{123}	—	March 28, 2014	Haleakala	Pan-STARRS 1	H	320 m	MPC · JPL
860976	2014 HM_{124}	—	July 28, 2008	Mount Lemmon	Mount Lemmon Survey	T_{j} (2.85)	3.2 km	MPC · JPL
860977	2014 HS_{127}	—	April 23, 2014	Cerro Tololo-DECam	DECam	·	690 m	MPC · JPL
860978	2014 HP_{128}	—	March 29, 2014	Kitt Peak	Spacewatch	·	1.1 km	MPC · JPL
860979	2014 HT_{130}	—	April 9, 2010	Mount Lemmon	Mount Lemmon Survey	ADE	1.2 km	MPC · JPL
860980	2014 HX_{131}	—	March 3, 2000	Sacramento Peak	SDSS	·	590 m	MPC · JPL
860981	2014 HC_{132}	—	March 24, 2014	Haleakala	Pan-STARRS 1	·	1.4 km	MPC · JPL
860982	2014 HW_{132}	—	September 21, 2012	Mount Lemmon	Mount Lemmon Survey	H	290 m	MPC · JPL
860983	2014 HA_{135}	—	April 23, 2014	Cerro Tololo-DECam	DECam	·	430 m	MPC · JPL
860984	2014 HC_{136}	—	September 26, 2006	Mount Lemmon	Mount Lemmon Survey	·	1.3 km	MPC · JPL
860985	2014 HE_{136}	—	February 5, 2009	Kitt Peak	Spacewatch	·	1.3 km	MPC · JPL
860986	2014 HU_{138}	—	April 23, 2014	Cerro Tololo-DECam	DECam	·	1.4 km	MPC · JPL
860987	2014 HU_{139}	—	April 5, 2014	Haleakala	Pan-STARRS 1	·	1.1 km	MPC · JPL
860988	2014 HC_{141}	—	April 23, 2014	Cerro Tololo-DECam	DECam	·	1.2 km	MPC · JPL
860989	2014 HU_{142}	—	September 24, 2006	Kitt Peak	Spacewatch	KOR	880 m	MPC · JPL
860990	2014 HN_{143}	—	April 24, 2014	Mount Lemmon	Mount Lemmon Survey	·	1.3 km	MPC · JPL
860991	2014 HJ_{147}	—	October 11, 2012	Mount Lemmon	Mount Lemmon Survey	H	330 m	MPC · JPL
860992	2014 HC_{150}	—	April 2, 2014	Mount Lemmon	Mount Lemmon Survey	·	720 m	MPC · JPL
860993	2014 HO_{151}	—	October 24, 2011	Haleakala	Pan-STARRS 1	·	2.7 km	MPC · JPL
860994	2014 HW_{154}	—	April 23, 2014	Haleakala	Pan-STARRS 1	·	490 m	MPC · JPL
860995	2014 HU_{155}	—	March 29, 2009	Kitt Peak	Spacewatch	BRA	1.1 km	MPC · JPL
860996	2014 HA_{156}	—	March 27, 2014	Haleakala	Pan-STARRS 1	·	920 m	MPC · JPL
860997	2014 HV_{157}	—	March 1, 2009	Kitt Peak	Spacewatch	·	1.6 km	MPC · JPL
860998	2014 HQ_{158}	—	March 25, 2014	Kitt Peak	Spacewatch	·	790 m	MPC · JPL
860999	2014 HE_{159}	—	April 24, 2014	Mount Lemmon	Mount Lemmon Survey	·	470 m	MPC · JPL
861000	2014 HW_{159}	—	April 24, 2014	Haleakala	Pan-STARRS 1	·	450 m	MPC · JPL

back to top
