= Edgar Wilson Award =

Annual award for amateur astronomers involved in discovering comets

- Description: Awarded to amateur astronomers who discover one or more comets
- Country: International
- Presented by: Smithsonian Astrophysical Observatory (via CBAT)
- Rewards: Monetary award and a plaque
- First award: 1998
- Currently held by: Amateur comet discoverers
- Website: http://www.cbat.eps.harvard.edu/special/EdgarWilson.html

The Edgar Wilson Award is an annual international award established in 1998 consisting of a monetary award and a plaque allocated annually to amateur comet discoverers. It is administered by the Smithsonian Astrophysical Observatory (SAO) through the IAU's Central Bureau for Astronomical Telegrams (CBAT).

== Origins ==
Edgar Wilson was an American businessman who lived in Lexington, Kentucky. After he died in 1976, the Edgar Wilson Charitable Trust Fund was set up and awards were allocated in accordance with the terms of his bequest.

== Eligibility ==
Each year the award is divided between amateur astronomers who during that year, using amateur equipment, discover one or more new comets which are then officially named after them. The annual total award is of the order of US$20,000 but fluctuates from year to year. Since 2014 the award was not given, but reestablished in 2024 (without a donated price). In any year when there are no eligible discoverers, CBAT makes the award to the amateur astronomer or astronomers it considers "have made the greatest contribution toward promoting an interest in the study of comets".

== Recipients ==
Although the Smithsonian Astrophysical Observatory has awarded the recipients, after 2014 the Central Bureau for Astronomical Telegrams could confirm in 2024 that the awards for the comet discoveries in the period July 2014 – June 2018 had been given.

A list of recipients current to 2024:

- 2024
  - Hideo Nishimura, Japan (C/2023 P1)
  - Gennadii Borisov, Russia (C/2023 T2)
  - Jordi Camarasa, Spain; and Grzegorz Duszanowicz, Sweden (C/2023 V4)
  - Xing Gao and Xi Liao, China; Robson Henrique dos Santos Hahn, Germany (P/2024 FG9)
- 2023
  - Alain Maury, Chile; and Georges Attard, France (C/2022 N1)
  - Jost Jahn, Germany (P/2023 C1)
- 2022
  - Hideo Nishimura, Japan (C/2021 O1)
  - Alain Maury, Chile; and Georges Attard, France (P/2021 U3, C/2021 X1, C/2022 J1)
- 2021
  - Leonardo S. Amaral, Brazil (C/2020 O2)
  - Gennadii Borisov, Russia (C/2020 Q1 and C/2021 L3)
  - Alain Maury, Chile; and Georges Attard, France (C/2021 J1)
- 2020
  - Gennadii Borisov, Russia (2I/2019 Q4 and C/2019 V1)
  - Masayuki Iwamoto, Japan (C/2020 A2)
  - Eduardo Pimentel, Brazil (P/2020 G1)
  - Cristovao Jacques, Eduardo Pimentel, and Joao Barros, Brazil (C/2020 J1)
- 2019
  - Donald Edward Machholz, USA (C/2018 V1) [posthumous award]
  - Shigehisa Fujikawa, Japan (C/2018 V1)
  - Masayuki Iwamoto, Japan (C/2018 V1 and C/2018 Y1)
- 2018
  - Joao Barros, Brazil (C/2018 E2)
- 2017
  - Gennadii Borisov, Russia (C/2016 R3 and C/2017 E1)
  - Joao Barros, Brazil (C/2017 D2)
  - Terry Lovejoy, Australia (C/2017 E4)
  - Goran Gasparovic, Croatia (P/2017 K3)
  - Cristovao Jacques, Brazil (C/2017 K6)
- 2016
  - Eduardo Pimentel, Brazil (P/2015 Q2)
  - William Kwong Yeung, Canada (C/2015 VL62)
  - Leonid Elenin, Russia (C/2015 X4)
- 2015
  - Gao Xing (Gaoxing) (3) and Sun Guoyou, China (C/2015 F5 (SWAN-Xingming))
  - Terry Lovejoy, Australia, (C/2014 Q2)
  - Gennadii Borisov, Russia (C/2014 Q3, C/2014 R1, and C/2015 D4)
  - Leonid Elenin, Russia, (P/2014 X1)
  - Michal Kusiak, Michal Zolnowski, Rafal Reszelewski, and Marcin Gedek, Poland (C/2015 F2)
  - Cristovao Jacques, Brazil (C/2015 F4)
- 2014
  - Terry Lovejoy, Australia (C/2013 R1)
  - Michael Schwartz, U.S. (P/2013 T2 and C/2014 B1)
  - Paolo Holvorcem, Brazil (C/2013 D1)
  - Gennadii Borisov, Russia (C/2013 V2)
  - Vitali Nevski, Russia (P/2013 V3)
  - Cristovao Jacques, Brazil (C/2014 E2)
  - Borisov (special Award for comet C/2013 N4, which was found in professional capacity)
  - Michel Ory, Switzerland (special Award for C/2013 V5, which was named Oukaimeden)
  - Jacques, Eduardo Pimental, and Joao Barros (special Award for C/2014 A4, which was named SONEAR)
  - Matthias Busch and Rafal Reszelewski (special Award for C/2014 C1, which was named TOTAS)
  - Holvorcem and Schwartz (special Award for C/2014 F2, which was named Tenagra)
- 2013
  - Tomáš Vorobjov, Slovak Republic (P/2012 T7)
  - Paulo Holvorcem, Brazil (C/2013 D1)
  - Masayuki Iwamoto, Japan (C/2013 E2)
  - Claudine Rinner, France (special award for finding three comets named "MOSS")
  - Michael Schwartz, Arizona, U.S. (special award for finding several comets named "Tenagra")
  - Vitali Nevski and Artyom Novichonok, Russia (special award for finding C/2012 S1)
- 2012
  - Leonid Elenin, Russia (P/2011 NO1)
  - Artyom O. Novichonok and Vladimir V. Gerke, Russia (P/2011 R3)
  - Claudine Rinner, France (P/2011 W2)
  - Terry Lovejoy, Australia (C/2011 W3)
  - Manfred Bruenjes, Missouri, U.S. (C/2012 C2)
- 2011
  - Kaoru Ikeya and Shigeki Murakami, Japan (P/2010 V1)
  - Leonid Elenin, Russia (C/2010 X1)
  - Michael Schwartz, Arizona, U.S.; and Paulo Holvorcem, Brazil (C/2011 K1)
- 2010
  - Rui Yang, Hangzhou, Zhejiang, China; and Xing Gao, Ürümqi, Xinjiang province, China (P/2009 L2)
  - Donald Machholz, Colfax, CA, U.S. (C/2010 F4)
  - Jan Vales, Idrija, Slovenia (P/2010 H2)
- 2009
  - Robert E. Holmes Jr., Charleston, Illinois, U.S. (C/2008 N1)
  - Stanislav Maticic, Crni Vrh Observatory, Slovenia (C/2008 Q1)
  - Michel Ory, Delemont, Switzerland (P/2008 Q2)
  - Kōichi Itagaki, Yamagata, Japan (C/2009 E1)
  - Dae-am Yi, Yeongwol-kun, Gangwon-do, Korea (C/2009 F6)
- 2008
  - Tao Chen, Suzhou City, Jiangsu province, China; and Xing Gao, Ürümqi, Xinjiang province, China (C/2008 C1).
- 2007
  - John Broughton, Reedy Creek, Qld., Australia (C/2006 OF2)
  - David H. Levy, Tucson, Arizona, U.S. (P/2006 T1)
  - Terry Lovejoy, Thornlands, Qld., Australia (C/2007 E2 and C/2007 K5)
- 2006
  - Charles Wilson Juels, Fountain Hills, Arizona, U.S.;
  - and Paulo R. C. Holvorcem, Campinas, Brazil (C/2005 N1)
  - John Broughton, Reedy Creek, Qld., Australia (P/2005 T5)
- 2005
  - Roy A. Tucker, Tucson, Arizona, U.S. (C/2004 Q1)
  - Donald Machholz, Colfax, California, U.S. (C/2004 Q2)
- 2004
  - Vello Tabur, Wanniassa, A.C.T., Australia (C/2003 T3)
  - William A. Bradfield, Yankalilla, S. Australia (C/2004 F4)
- 2003
  - Sebastian Florian Hoenig, Dossenheim or Heidelberg, Germany (C/2002 O4)
  - Tetuo Kudo, Nishi Goshi, Kikuchi, Kumamoto, Japan (C/2002 X5)
  - Shigehisa Fujikawa, Oonohara, Kagawa, Japan (C/2002 X5)
  - Charles Wilson Juels, Fountain Hills, Arizona, U.S.;
  - and Paulo R. Holvorcem, Campinas, Brazil (C/2002 Y1)
- 2002
  - Vance Avery Petriew, Regina, Saskatchewan, Canada (P/2001 Q2)
  - William Kwong Yeung, Benson, Arizona, U.S. (P/2002 BV)
  - Kaoru Ikeya, Mori, Shuchi, Shizuoka, Japan (C/2002 C1)
  - Daqing Zhang, Kaifeng, Henan province, China (C/2002 C1)
  - Douglas Snyder, Palominas, Arizona, U.S. (C/2002 E2)
  - Shigeki Murakami, Matsunoyama, Niigata, Japan (C/2002 E2)
  - Syogo Utsunomiya, Minami-Oguni, Aso, Kumamoto, Japan (C/2002 F1)
- 2001
  - Albert F. A. L. Jones, Stoke, Nelson, New Zealand (C/2000 W1)
  - Syogo Utsunomiya, Minami-Oguni, Aso, Kumamoto, Japan (C/2000 W1)
- 2000
  - Daniel W. Lynn, Kinglake West, Victoria, Australia (C/1999 N2)
  - Korado Korlević, Visnjan, Croatia (P/1999 WJ7)
  - Gary Hug and Graham E. Bell, Eskridge, Kansas, U.S. (P/1999 X1)
- 1999
  - Peter Williams, Heathcote, N.S.W., Australia (C/1998 P1)
  - Roy A. Tucker, Tucson, Arizona, U.S. (P/1998 QP54)
  - Michael Jaeger, Weissenkirchen i.d. Wachau, Austria (P/1998 U3)
  - Justin Tilbrook, Clare, S. Australia (C/1999 A1)
  - Korado Korlevic and Mario Juric, Visnjan, Croatia (P/1999 DN3)
  - Steven Lee, Coonabarabran, N.S.W., Australia (C/1999 H1)

Among the first eight years' worth of Wilson Awards (1999–2006), 17 awards went to visual discoverers of comets, 10 awards went to CCD discoverers, and one award went to a photographic discoverer of a comet. (Here, an "award" is taken to mean one full award, meaning that some teams of two people—in cases of CCD discoveries—represent single cash awards that are split evenly between the team members, even though each member gets their own award plaque.)

== See also ==
- List of astronomy awards
