= Michel Ory =

Swiss amateur astronomer (born 1966)

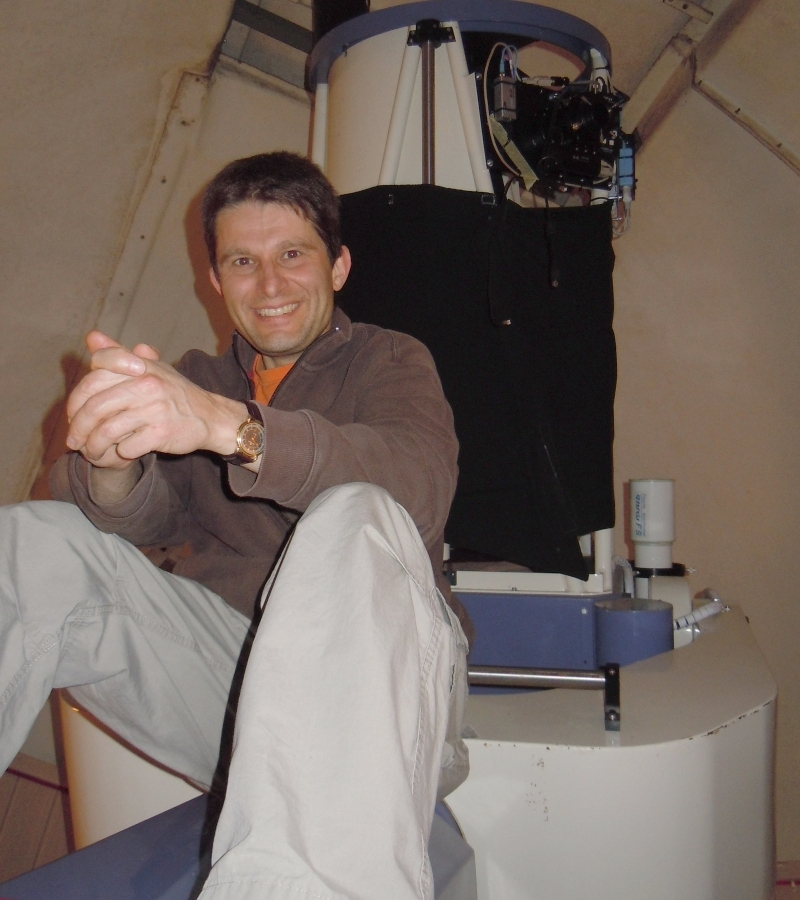
- Born: 18 April 1966 (age 60); Develier, Switzerland
- Occupations: amateur astronomer, teacher of physics at the cantonal school Porrentruy
- Known for: discovering minor planets and the periodic comet 304P/Ory

Michel Ory (born 18 April 1966) is a Swiss amateur astronomer and a prolific discoverer of minor planets and comets.

== Biography ==
Ory was born in Develier, in the district of Delémont in the canton of Jura in Switzerland. He attended school in Delémont, and at the cantonal school in Porrentruy, then studied at the University of Geneva, graduating in physics in 1990. He trained as a scientific journalist at Cedos SA in Carouge, qualifying in 1992, then undertook teacher training at the Institut pédagogique in Porrentruy, qualifying as a secondary school teacher in 1994, then becoming a physics teacher at the cantonal school in Porrentruy, a position which he continues to hold in 2012. Ory is married and has two children.

A keen amateur astronomer, he joined the Jura Astronomical Society in 1990 and between 1993 and 1998 he was one of the seven member-builders of the Jura Astronomical Observatory.

== Awards ==
He was one of five winners of the 2009 Edgar Wilson Award for his discovery on 27 August 2008 of 304P/Ory (P/2008 Q2 Ory), a periodic comet of the Jupiter family, using a 24-inch f/3.9 reflector at the Jura Observatory in Switzerland.

In 2018, he was awarded a Gene Shoemaker NEO Grant which will improve the robotic survey he conducts in collaboration with Claudine Rinner at the Oukaïmeden Observatory (J43) in Morocco. He is a teacher of physics at the cantonal school in Porrentruy, Switzerland. The main-belt asteroid 67979 Michelory was named in his honor.

In 2020, he and Claudine Rinner jointly received the Dorothea Klumpke - Isaac Roberts prize from the Société astronomique de France.

== Discoveries ==
Minor planets discovered: 210
see § List of discovered minor planets

During 2000–2010, Michel Ory has made a large number of discoveries of different astronomical objects at several observatory sites. As per 2016, he is credited by the Minor Planet Center with the discovery of 199 numbered minor planets he made during 2001–2010.

At the Jura Observatory, located in Vicques, Switzerland, he made his most famous discovery, 304P/Ory, a periodic comet of the Jupiter family, and also discovered over 234 asteroids (including unnumbered bodies) and two supernovae. Ory also made discoveries at two other observatory sites in the U.S., namely at Tenagra II Observatory (926), Arizona, and at Sierra Stars Observatory (G68), California, from where he discovered another 11 and 2 asteroids, respectively.

=== Comet 304P/Ory ===
It was on the nights of 26–27 and 27–28 August 2008 that Ory discovered what he thought was a near-Earth asteroid, which he reported to the Minor Planet Center, Harvard. At around 8:08 p.m. on 28 August he received notification from the Central Bureau for Astronomical Telegrams (CBAT) that the object was in fact a periodic comet: the announcement ran, "An apparently asteroidal object discovered by Michel Ory (Delemont, Switzerland, on CCD images obtained with a 0.61-m f/3.9 reflector at Vicques; discovery observation tabulated below), which was posted on the Minor Planet Center's 'NEOCP' webpage, has been found by other CCD observers to be cometary."

The comet was named 304P/Ory (P/2008 Q2 Ory) after him, and the CBAT announcement brought congratulations from around the world. The comet orbits the sun in an elliptical orbit with a period of 5.96 years.

Ory received the Edgar Wilson Award from the Smithsonian Astrophysical Observatory at Harvard University, and later in 2008 a square in Viques was named Place de la Comète P/2008 Q2 Ory in honour of his discovery.

== List of discovered minor planets ==
42113 Jura	15 January 2001	list
42191 Thurmann	14 February 2001	list
46095 Frédérickoby	15 March 2001	list
57658 Nilrem	17 October 2001	list
68718 Safi	17 February 2002	list
77755 Delémont	13 August 2001	list
84902 Porrentruy	17 October 2003	list
88906 Moutier	11 October 2001	list
95771 Lachat	9 March 2003	list
99824 Polnareff	29 June 2002	list
113415 Rauracia	30 September 2002	list
115950 Kocherpeter	18 November 2003	list
117736 Sherrod	4 April 2005	list
125076 Michelmayor	19 October 2001	list
126160 Fabienkuntz	4 January 2002	list
126748 Mariegerbet	16 February 2002	list
(128629) 2004 RS_{10}	7 September 2004	list
129078 Animoo	8 November 2004	list
129137 Hippolochos	13 January 2005	list
(143577) 2003 FG_{2}	23 March 2003	list
143622 Robertbloch	22 April 2003	list
145456 Sab	24 September 2005	list
145559 Didiermüller	18 July 2006	list
(145565) 2006 OH_{10}	24 July 2006	list
(152190) 2005 QZ_{56}	29 August 2005	list

(155018) 2005 QK_{28}	28 August 2005	list
157456 Pivatte	17 November 2004	list
162937 Prêtre	12 August 2001	list
(163380) 2002 PN_{86}	13 August 2002	list
167855 Natalinistephane	1 March 2005	list
170162 Nicolashayek	23 March 2003	list
170906 Coluche	9 December 2004	list
170927 Dgebessire	5 January 2005	list
(171376) 2006 OM	17 July 2006	list
(173050) 2006 QU_{142}	31 August 2006	list
173086 Nireus	8 September 2007	list
175208 Vorbourg	1 April 2005	list
175282 Benhida	1 June 2005	list
176532 Boskri	5 January 2002	list
177415 Queloz	9 February 2004	list
177866 Barrau	28 August 2005	list
(179764 Myriamsarah	16 September 2002	list
180643 Cardoen	14 April 2004	list
183114 Vicques	13 September 2002	list
184508 Courroux	10 August 2005	list
187123 Schorderet	30 August 2005	list
(188446 Louischevrolet	17 April 2004	list
188506 Roulet	5 September 2004	list
(191672) 2004 RT_{10}	7 September 2004	list
197864 Florentpagny	5 September 2004	list

197870) Erkman	6 September 2004	list
(198920) 2005 UP_{158}	30 October 2005	list
199838) Hafili	11 March 2007	list
(200058) 2008 QA_{4}	24 August 2008	list
204702) Péquignat	19 March 2006	list
207109) Sturmenchopf	11 January 2005	list
(209675) 2005 DF_{1}	28 February 2005	list
(210436) 2008 YZ_{29}	29 December 2008	list
210997 Guenat	14 December 2001	list
211613 Christophelovis	25 October 2003	list
212374 Vellerat	21 April 2006	list
213770 Fignon	23 February 2003	list
214081 Balavoine	17 April 2004	list
214136 Alinghi	13 January 2005	list
214378 Kleinmann	10 June 2005	list
214432 Belprahon	29 August 2005	list
218268 Pierremariepele	20 February 2003	list
(218610) 2005 OK_{15}	30 July 2005	list
223566 Petignat	22 March 2004	list
224027 Grégoire	10 June 2005	list
(224131) 2005 QO_{28}	28 August 2005	list
224206 Pietchisson	21 September 2005	list
227065 Romandia	1 April 2005	list
227147 Coggiajerome	10 August 2005	list
(227583) 2006 AU_{2}	5 January 2006	list

227928 Ludoferriere	6 April 2007	list
(227929) 2007 GT_{4}	11 April 2007	list
(228057) 2008 JA_{20}	6 May 2008	list
(229352) 2005 QB_{57}	29 August 2005	list
(229497) 2005 VW_{4}	6 November 2005	list
(229684) 2007 DQ_{11}	20 February 2007	list
(229722) 2007 GE	6 April 2007	list
230155 Francksallet	26 August 2001	list
230975 Rogerfederer	10 January 2005	list
(231487) 2008 PQ_{3}	3 August 2008	list
233488 Cosandey	16 December 2006	list
(233585) 2007 RJ_{18}	14 September 2007	list
235027 Pommard	23 March 2003	list
(236808) 2007 RX_{12}	11 September 2007	list
238593 Paysdegex	4 January 2005	list
238817 Titeuf	10 August 2005	list
240871 MOSS	19 February 2006	list
241364 Reneangelil	7 January 2008	list
242492 Fantomas	10 November 2004	list
242516 Lindseystirling	4 January 2005	list
242529 Hilaomar	13 January 2005	list
246803 Martinezpatrick	17 March 2009	list
248183 Peisandros	13 January 2005	list
(248748) 2006 RN	1 September 2006	list
(248951) 2006 XA_{4}	13 December 2006	list

249302 Ajoie	26 October 2008	list
(255592) 2006 OG_{10}	24 July 2006	list
(257156) 2008 HO_{37}	29 April 2008	list
(257251) 2009 FG_{25}	22 March 2009	list
259905 Vougeot	14 March 2004	list
260906 Robichon	1 September 2005	list
262705 Vosne-Romanee	14 December 2006	list
(262910) 2007 CL_{51}	15 February 2007	list
(264021) 2009 QB_{2}	17 August 2009	list
272209 Corsica	28 August 2005	list
275962 Chalverat	21 November 2001	list
276781 Montchaibeux	11 May 2004	list
(278211) 2007 EX_{38}	11 March 2007	list
(278283) 2007 GO_{27}	15 April 2007	list
(278303) 2007 HY	17 April 2007	list
280640 Ruetsch	4 January 2005	list
280642 Doubs	13 January 2005	list
(281287) 2007 RD_{133}	15 September 2007	list
282669 Erguël	6 November 2005	list
(283073) 2008 SP_{81}	21 September 2008	list
284945 Saint-Imier	14 March 2010	list
(289317) 2005 AE_{28}	13 January 2005	list
(289318) 2005 AF_{28}	13 January 2005	list
289586 Shackleton	30 March 2005	list
289587 Chantdugros	30 March 2005	list

289600 Tastevin	1 April 2005	list
290001 Uebersax	10 August 2005	list
(290030) 2005 QP_{28}	28 August 2005	list
(290055) 2005 QF_{57}	30 August 2005	list
(291422) 2006 DN_{14}	21 February 2006	list
291847 Ladoix	19 July 2006	list
(294543) 2007 YN_{2}	18 December 2007	list
(295474) 2008 QB_{18}	28 August 2008	list
(296551) 2009 QY_{1}	16 August 2009	list
296820 Paju	18 November 2009	list
297026 Corton	7 April 2010	list
299020 Chennaoui	5 January 2005	list
301128 Frédéricpont	28 November 2008	list
301413 Rogerfux	27 February 2009	list
301552 Alimenti	14 April 2009	list
305254 Moron	19 December 2007	list
305776 Susinnogabriele	27 February 2009	list
309917 Sefyani	20 March 2009	list
(312014) 2007 RH_{18}	13 September 2007	list
(312542) 2009 FC_{1}	17 March 2009	list
(312563) 2009 HO_{2}	18 April 2009	list
313921 Daassou	5 September 2004	list
314040 Tavannes	4 January 2005	list
(316016) 2009 FO_{21}	22 March 2009	list
316039 Breizh	14 April 2009	list

316080 Boni	16 May 2009	list
318412 Tramelan	11 January 2005	list
318676 Bellelay	10 August 2005	list
320065 Erbaghjolu	11 March 2007	list
(321404) 2009 QP	16 August 2009	list
(321410) 2009 QD_{6}	18 August 2009	list
(324287) 2006 DO	20 February 2006	list
(325442) 2009 QZ_{1}	17 August 2009	list
327082 Tournesol	10 November 2004	list
327632 Ferrarini	24 July 2006	list
(328370) 2008 QY_{17}	27 August 2008	list
329935 Prévôt	30 July 2005	list
(330380) 2006 XJ_{4}	14 December 2006	list
331992 Chasseral	3 April 2005	list
(333607) 2007 LY	9 June 2007	list
(335725) 2007 DP_{11}	20 February 2007	list
336108 Luberon	2 May 2008	list
336203 Sandrobuss	22 September 2008	list
(336604) 2009 UL_{5}	18 October 2009	list
(336605) 2009 UM_{5}	20 October 2009	list
337380 Lenormand	17 August 2001	list
339486 Raimeux	3 April 2005	list
(339635) 2005 QR_{28}	29 August 2005	list
(345879) 2007 RW_{12}	11 September 2007	list
(346293) 2008 PG_{3}	4 August 2008	list

349606 Fleurance	26 October 2008	list
352860 Monflier	30 November 2008	list
(353114) 2009 FR_{14}	20 March 2009	list
(353116) 2009 FL_{19}	21 March 2009	list
360762 FRIPON	4 January 2005	list
(362176) 2009 FP_{21}	22 March 2009	list
362238 Shisseh	19 May 2009	list
363582 Folpotat	9 February 2004	list
368588 Lazrek	8 September 2004	list
372305 Bourdeille	20 November 2008	list
375067 Hewins	6 September 2007	list
378669 Rivas	29 April 2008	list
(381433) 2008 PJ_{18}	10 August 2008	list
(385633) 2005 QD_{57}	29 August 2005	list
394445 Unst	11 September 2007	list
399745 Ouchaou	3 April 2005	list
402852 Picardie	9 September 2007	list
(406352) 2007 RC_{162}	15 September 2007	list
406737 Davet	25 April 2008	list
414283 Lecureuil	30 June 2008	list
418419 Lacanto	28 June 2008	list
419521 Meursault	7 May 2010	list
423205 Echezeaux	5 September 2004	list
(423207) 2004 RA_{8}	6 September 2004	list
(423269) 2004 VX_{28}	8 November 2004	list

(428092) 2006 QO_{4}	18 August 2006	list
(428499) 2007 WZ_{3}	17 November 2007	list
(435549) 2008 QZ_{3}	24 August 2008	list
(445143) 2008 WX_{94}	26 November 2008	list
450390 Pitchcomment	8 August 2005	list
469748 Volnay	9 August 2005	list
(469758) 2005 QQ_{28}	28 August 2005	list
470600 Calogero	6 August 2008	list
481984 Cernunnos	20 May 2009	list
(495845) 2002 PP_{123}	15 August 2002	list
(541778) 2011 YH_{15}	26 December 2011	list
(542072) 2012 LH_{10}	15 June 2012	list
(542180) 2013 AS_{29}	7 January 2013	list
(542245) 2013 AP_{131}	7 January 2013	list
(542307) 2013 BX_{68}	10 January 2013	list
542888 Confino	10 June 2013	list
543081 Albertducrocq	15 August 2013	list
543315 Asmakhammari	24 December 2013	list
(544892) 2014 WV_{475}	3 July 2013	list
(547399) 2010 RO_{42}	4 September 2010	list
(549610) 2011 OP_{61}	3 October 2016	list
(550157) 2012 BE_{87}	19 December 2011	list
(550333) 2012 DY_{105}	29 February 2012	list
(552323) 2013 WK_{72}	11 November 2013	list
552784 Jeanbrahie	6 October 2010	list

(553857) 2012 BY_{2}	18 January 2012	list
(555256) 2013 TA_{171}	15 October 2013	list
(557524) 2014 VC_{11}	21 October 2014	list
(559159) 2015 BE_{492}	9 October 2013	list
(561239) 2015 RU_{137}	19 December 2012	list
(561503) 2015 TO_{181}	19 December 2012	list
(561917) 2015 VF_{162}	23 January 2012	list
(562502) 2016 AF_{30}	10 December 2015	list
(563594) 2016 CM_{320}	15 October 2013	list
(565018) 2017 BC_{10}	21 December 2016	list
(565623) 2017 FQ_{23}	18 December 2012	list
(567055) 2019 AV_{24}	3 December 2013	list
(567058) 2019 AM_{25}	18 January 2012	list
(577060) 2013 AY_{29}	7 January 2013	list
(578770) 2014 FT_{41}	8 January 2013	list
(579631) 2014 UL_{214}	12 June 2013	list
(582933) 2016 CE_{238}	7 June 2013	list
(583475) 2016 GV_{257}	3 July 2013	list
(587003) 2005 QG_{57}	30 August 2005	list
589175 Romainguélat	7 April 2013	list
(589177) 2009 HL_{120}	8 January 2013	list
(590389) 2011 YL_{47}	28 December 2011	list
(590472) 2012 BM_{74}	23 January 2012	list
(590551) 2012 DY_{15}	21 February 2012	list
590761 Fixin	7 February 2005	list

591592 Carlanderson	3 December 2013	list
(593908) 2016 CZ_{69}	13 January 2005	list
600639 Gevreychambertin	21 February 2012	list
600665 Nuitsaintgeorges	21 February 2012	list
601227 Ammann	18 December 2012	list
(601502) 2013 EH_{159}	10 October 2015	list
(602014) 2014 BN_{3}	2 December 2013	list
(602073) 2014 DE_{18}	29 January 2014	list
(602082) 2014 DD_{43}	26 February 2014	list
(606867) 2019 JR_{24}	30 December 2014	list
612916 Stirlingcolgate	7 January 2005	list
(613999) 2008 PX_{6}	5 August 2008	list
(621994) 2011 UW_{441}	2 January 2017	list
(622237) 2013 BC_{59}	7 January 2013	list
(634614) 2012 BT_{91}	20 December 2011	list
(635331) 2013 GL_{88}	8 April 2013	list
(635680) 2014 BA_{11}	7 January 2014	list
(651580) 2013 CC_{109}	8 January 2013	list
(652427) 2014 AJ_{45}	30 December 2013	list
(652481) 2014 BK_{43}	31 December 2013	list
(652521) 2014 CZ_{7}	28 January 2014	list
(655697) 2015 PS_{148}	26 February 2014	list
(657800) 2017 AC_{7}	2 January 2017	list
(666735) 2010 TX_{169}	11 October 2010	list
667294 Missen	28 March 2011	list

(668441) 2011 YH_{47}	28 December 2011	list
(668525) 2012 AG_{36}	2 January 2012	list
(668545) 2012 BV_{56}	23 January 2012	list
(669554) 2012 YD_{1}	18 December 2012	list
(669723) 2013 BG_{58}	8 January 2013	list
(670105) 2013 GY_{40}	8 April 2013	list
(670106) 2013 GZ_{40}	8 April 2013	list
(670713) 2013 XA_{29}	3 December 2013	list
(670872) 2014 CM_{3}	6 January 2014	list
(671052) 2014 EO_{255}	3 March 2014	list
(676311) 2016 EO_{238}	9 June 2013	list
(676877) 2016 PB_{118}	4 March 2014	list
(677267) 2016 TK_{102}	3 October 2016	list
678198) Jeanmariferenbac	9 October 2013	list
678300) Herbertcouriol	29 August 2017	list
678471) Piermichelbergé	19 September 2017	list
(680660) 2003 BN_{95}	26 February 2014	list
(682074) 2006 BL_{289}	16 October 2013	list
(684862) 2008 YW_{80}	10 March 2005	list
(687517) 2011 UF_{429}	30 August 2014	list
(688863) 2013 AQ_{123}	14 January 2013	list
(694333) 2015 RN_{189}	19 December 2011	list
(704517) 2008 QX_{17}	27 August 2008	list
(705756) 2009 QX_{1}	16 August 2009	list
(708291) 2011 YU_{54}	20 December 2011	list

(708650) 2012 GH_{31}	28 February 2012	list
(709391) 2013 AP_{123}	14 January 2013	list
(709666) 2013 DU_{3}	8 January 2013	list
(710037) 2013 NQ_{12}	5 June 2013	list
(710780) 2014 EK	3 March 2014	list
(711913) 2014 QL_{423}	21 February 2012	list
715542 Tafforin	15 October 2015	list
(717886) 2017 BW_{86}	15 October 2015	list
(717933) 2017 BR_{133}	10 October 2015	list
(718181) 2017 DW_{115}	27 February 2017	list
(722091) 2005 EZ_{96}	3 March 2005	list
(725810) 2009 FM_{19}	21 March 2009	list
(729615) 2011 HS_{88}	27 August 2008	list
(731147) 2013 AP_{186}	7 January 2013	list
(731155) 2013 AN_{203}	8 January 2013	list
(731315) 2013 CU_{173}	11 February 2013	list
(732165) 2013 YN_{97}	31 December 2013	list
(735536) 2015 HA_{108}	25 January 2014	list
(735843) 2015 MV_{138}	10 February 2013	list
(737749) 2016 EA_{57}	3 March 2016	list
(739294) 2017 KC_{26}	18 December 2012	list
(744130) 2009 CS_{67}	25 December 2012	list
(746532) 2011 YG_{18}	19 December 2011	list
(748291) 2013 NR_{22}	5 July 2013	list
(748407) 2013 QB_{66}	9 August 2013	list

(748453) 2013 RF_{43}	10 September 2013	list
(748739) 2013 VA_{31}	2 November 2013	list
(748827) 2013 YD_{41}	3 December 2013	list
(755097) 2016 XJ_{22}	6 December 2016	list
(765235) 2013 TU_{190}	9 October 2013	list
(765464) 2013 VR_{72}	11 November 2013	list
(765732) 2013 YU_{158}	30 December 2013	list
(765769) 2014 AT_{26}	3 December 2013	list
(770332) 2015 XH_{305}	21 March 2013	list
(779767) 2011 WZ_{174}	28 November 2011	list
(781341) 2013 GP_{155}	7 April 2013	list
(781358) 2013 HH_{1}	16 April 2013	list
(781491) 2013 LD_{46}	12 June 2013	list
(781955) 2013 VF_{6}	4 November 2013	list
(784042) 2014 WT_{495}	25 November 2013	list
(784331) 2015 BQ_{54}	29 December 2014	list
(794313) 2006 KF_{154}	10 March 2016	list
(798848) 2012 YL_{2}	19 December 2012	list
(798879) 2013 AF_{11}	18 December 2012	list
(799082) 2013 CM_{221}	7 January 2013	list
(799385) 2013 LN_{37}	7 June 2013	list
(815262) 2009 UM_{14}	18 October 2009	list
(818282) 2013 LF_{29}	13 June 2013	list
(819180) 2014 FX_{55}	4 March 2014	list
(826571) 2021 FQ_{9}	9 October 2015	list

(834630) 2010 RN_{42}	4 September 2010	list
(837933) 2013 WP_{55}	2 November 2013	list
(838095) 2014 AY_{26}	21 September 2008	list
(842264) 2015 TJ_{351}	8 October 2015	list
(842299) 2015 TK_{407}	15 October 2015	list
(856956) 2012 BC_{24}	18 January 2012	list
(859673) 2013 QL_{100}	30 August 2013	list
(860272) 2013 YM_{14}	3 December 2013	list
(860685) 2014 ES_{36}	26 February 2014	list
(867712) 2015 YD_{8}	18 December 2015	list
(870165) 2016 VB_{24}	9 November 2016	list
(870430) 2017 AJ_{48}	4 January 2017	list
(871113) 2017 KK_{40}	28 May 2017	list
(871626) 2017 SR_{233}	25 February 2014	list
(878163) 2011 UU_{271}	29 October 2011	list
(879036) 2013 LX_{37}	6 June 2013	list
(882135) 2015 UT_{72}	8 October 2015	list
(882364) 2015 YF_{8}	18 December 2015	list
(882383) 2016 AD_{12}	1 January 2016	list
