= C/2013 V5 (Oukaimeden) =

Comet

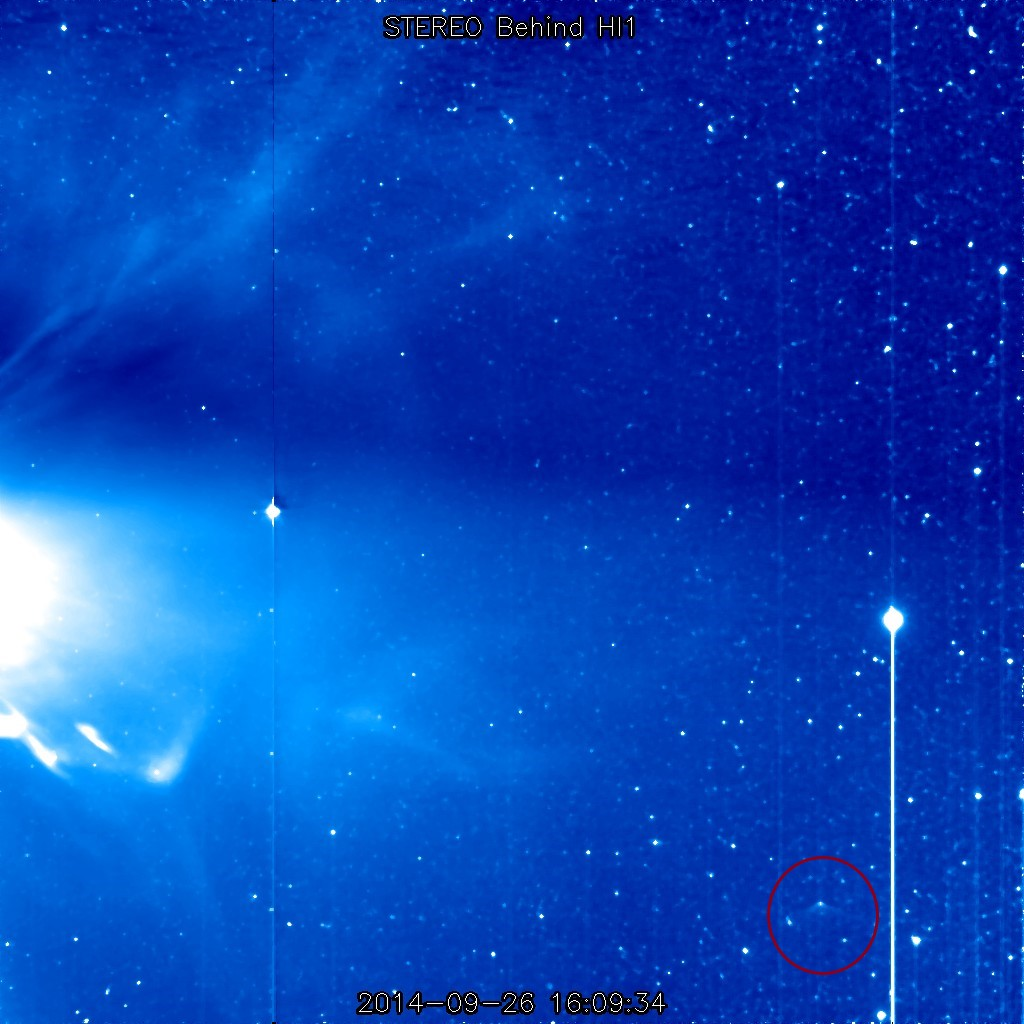
- Comet Oukaimeden imaged by STEREO HI-1B on 26 September 2014

Discovery
- Discovered by: Oukaimeden Observatory; 0.5-m reflector (J43)
- Discovery date: 12 November 2013

Orbital characteristics
- Epoch: 20 September 2014
- Orbit type: Oort cloud
- Aphelion: ~370,000 AU (6 ly) (inbound) (Note: The listed distance for the inbound AU is very close to a "no solution" Hyperbolic trajectory. The JPL Horizons answer of 370,000 AU (6 ly) is not realistic because it is just a generic fit to a curve assuming that the Sun+Comet are the only two objects in the universe.); ~680 AU (outbound)
- Perihelion: 0.62539 AU (q)
- Eccentricity: 0.99868
- Orbital period: several million years inbound (Barycentric solution for epoch 1950); ~6000 years outbound (Barycentric solution for epoch 2050)
- Inclination: 154.88°
- Last perihelion: 28 September 2014
- Jupiter MOID: 0.18 AU

Physical characteristics
- Mean radius: 8.29 km (5.15 mi)

C/2013 V5 (Oukaimeden) is a retrograde Oort cloud comet discovered on 12 November 2013 by Oukaimeden Observatory at an apparent magnitude of 19.4 using a 0.5-meter (20 in) reflecting telescope.

== Observational history ==
From 5 May 2014 until 18 July 2014 it had an elongation less than 30 degrees from the Sun. By late August 2014 it had brighten to apparent magnitude 8 making it a small telescope and high-end binoculars target for experienced observers. It crossed the celestial equator on 30 August 2014 becoming a Southern Hemisphere object. On 16 September 2014 the comet passed 0.480 AU (71,800,000 km; 44,600,000 mi) from Earth. The comet peaked around magnitude 6.2 in mid-September 2014 but only had an elongation of about 35 degrees from the Sun. On 20 September 2014 the comet was visible in STEREO HI-1B. The comet came to perihelion (closest approach to the Sun) on 28 September 2014 at a distance of 0.625 AU (93,500,000 km; 58,100,000 mi) from the Sun.

C/2013 V5 is dynamically new. It came from the Oort cloud with a loosely bound chaotic orbit that was easily perturbed by galactic tides and passing stars. Before entering the planetary region (epoch 1950), C/2013 V5 had an orbital period of several million years. After leaving the planetary region (epoch 2050), it will have an orbital period of about 6000 years.

The infrared spectroscopy of the comet revealed that most of its volatile ices, with the exception of ammonia are depleted. Spectrography also revealed that the relative abundance of ethane and methanol increased in the start of September 2014, suggesting that the ices that comprise the comet are heterogenous.
