= C/2014 E2 (Jacques) =

Long-period comet

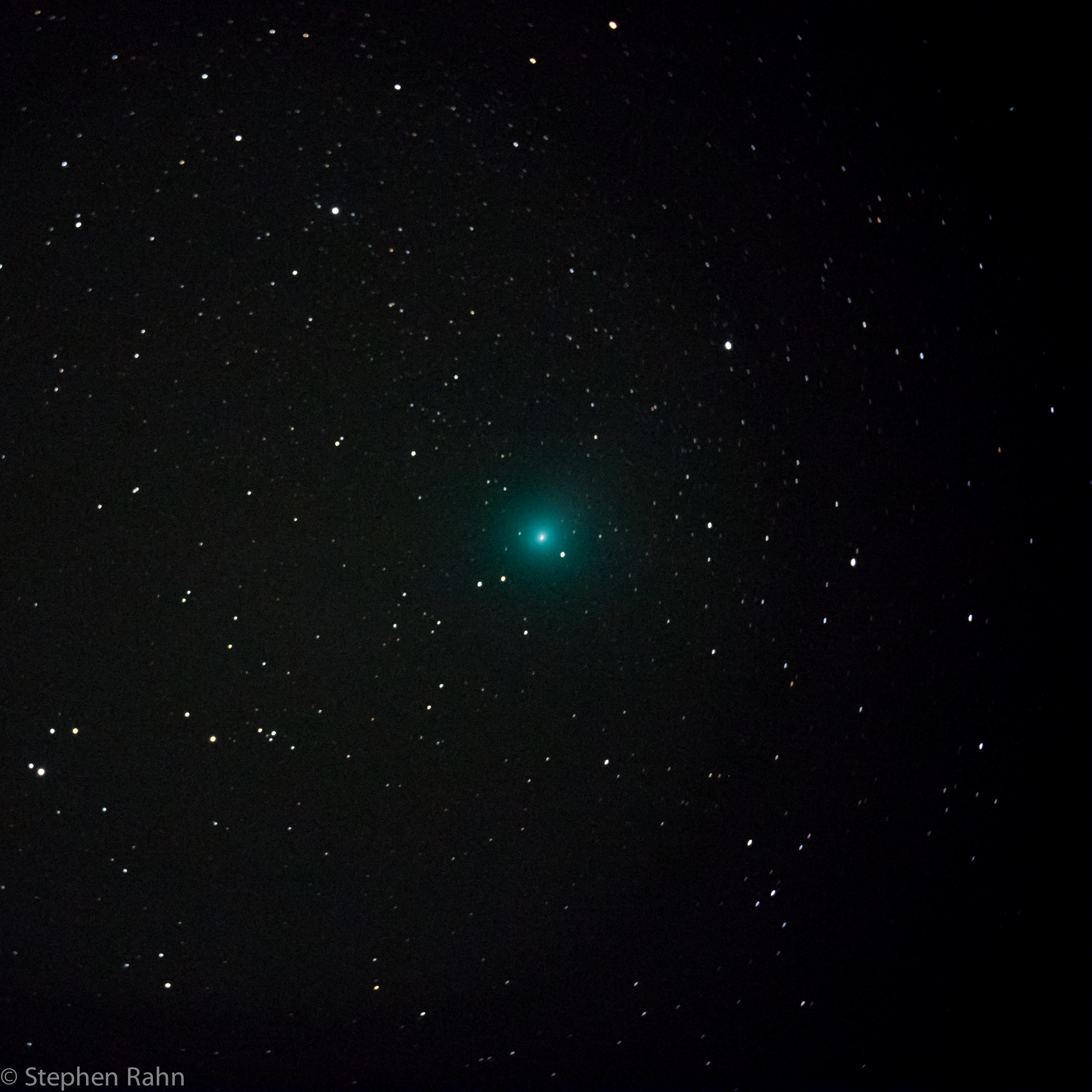
- Image of 2014 E2 (Jacques) in 24 August 2014

Discovery
- Discovered by: Cristóvão Jacques; Eduardo Pimentel; João Ribeiro de Barros; Marcelo Dias
- Discovery date: 13 March 2014

Orbital characteristics
- Epoch: 2014 May 23.0 TT (JD 2456800.5)
- Aphelion: ~1600 AU (epoch 1950)
- Perihelion: 0.6638 AU (q)
- Eccentricity: 0.99912 (e)
- Orbital period: ~22,000 years inbound (Barycentric solution for epoch 1950); ~12,000 years outbound (Barycentric solution for epoch 2050)
- Avg. orbital speed: 27 km/s
- Max. orbital speed: 51.7 km/s
- Inclination: 156.4° (i)
- Last perihelion: 2014 July 2

Physical characteristics
- Mean radius: 1.090 ± 0.038 km (0.677 ± 0.024 mi)
- Mean density: 440±60 kg/m^{3}

C/2014 E2 (Jacques), provisionally designated as S002692, is a long-period comet discovered by the Brazilian astronomers Cristóvão Jacques Lage de Faria, Eduardo Pimentel, João Ribeiro de Barros and Marcelo Dias on the night of 13 March 2014. It was the second comet discovered by the SONEAR Observatory team after comet C/2014 A4.

== Overview ==
Observations were made with a 0.45-meter (17.7-inch) f/2.9 wide-field reflector telescope with equatorial assembly and CCD camera at the Southern Observatory for Near Earth Asteroids Research (SONEAR), located near Oliveira, Minas Gerais, Brazil.

In late March 2014, C/2014 E2 (Jacques) appeared to contain a dense, bright coma (11.5-12 magnitude), visible with an 8-inch telescope. It crossed the celestial equator on 8 May 2014 becoming a Northern Hemisphere object. From 3 June 2014 until 17 July 2014 it had an elongation less than 30 degrees from the Sun. The comet was visible in LASCO C3 on 21 June 2014. C/2014 E2 peaked around apparent magnitude 6 in mid-July and was visible in binoculars above the glow of morning twilight.

C/2014 E2 passed 0.085 AU (12,700,000 km; 7,900,000 mi) from Venus on 13 July 2014. On 20 July 2014 the comet was near the naked eye star Beta Tauri. On 22 August 2014 it passed Epsilon Cassiopeiae. It reached perigee (closest approach to Earth) on 28 August 2014, at 0.56 AU (84,000,000 km; 52,000,000 mi). The comet passed about 3 degrees from Deneb from 4–5 September 2014. On 14 September the comet was near Albireo.

By October 2014 the comet had fainted to magnitude 10.
