= Paulo R. Holvorcem =

Brazilian amateur astronomer and mathematician

Minor planets discovered: 224
credited by the MPC, as per September 2016

Paulo Renato Centeno Holvorcem (born 10 July 1967) is a Brazilian amateur astronomer and mathematician who lives in Brasília, Brazil.

He is a prolific discoverer of asteroids. He is credited by the Minor Planet Center with the discovery or co-discovery (with Charles W. Juels) of about 197 minor planets between 1998 and 2010.

Holvorcem with Juels also discovered two comets: C/2002 Y1 (Juels-Holvorcem) and C/2005 N1 (Juels-Holvorcem). Holvorcem was also involved in the discovery of C/2011 K1 (Schwartz-Holvorcem).

The main-belt asteroid 13421 Holvorcem was named after him on 9 January 2001 (M.P.C. 41939).

Paulo's SkySift pipeline software is used by many observatories across the world for the detection of minor planets and transients.

== List of discovered minor planets ==
(17288) 2000 NZ_{10}	July 10, 2000
(18166) 2000 PG_{27}	August 8, 2000
(18759) 1999 HO_{2}	April 20, 1999
(25871) 2000 LZ_{26}	June 11, 2000
(28910) 2000 NH_{11}	July 10, 2000
(32143) 2000 LA_{27}	June 11, 2000
(32168) 2000 NP_{9}	July 10, 2000
(32172) 2000 NB_{11}	July 10, 2000
(33925) 2000 LB_{27}	June 11, 2000
(33944) 2000 MA	June 16, 2000
(33965) 2000 NY_{10}	July 10, 2000
(33966) 2000 NC_{11}	July 10, 2000
(34839) 2001 SL_{263}^{[1]}	September 25, 2001
42354 Kindleberger^{[1]}	February 12, 2002
42365 Caligiuri^{[1]}	February 12, 2002
(43617) 2002 CL_{43}^{[1]}	February 12, 2002
(46436) 2002 LH_{5}^{[1]}	June 6, 2002
(46437) 2002 LL_{5}^{[1]}	June 6, 2002
46441 Mikepenston^{[1]}	June 10, 2002
46442 Keithtritton^{[1]}	June 12, 2002
(48299) 2002 LE_{35}^{[1]}	June 11, 2002
48300 Kronk^{[1]}	June 11, 2002
(48301) 2002 LL_{35}^{[1]}	June 12, 2002
51983 Hönig^{[1]}	September 19, 2001
52005 Maik^{[1]}	February 8, 2002
52057 Clarkhowell^{[2]}	August 15, 2002
55331 Putzi^{[1]}	September 21, 2001
(55395) 2001 SY_{285}^{[1]}	September 28, 2001
55555 DNA^{[1]}	December 19, 2001
(55568) 2002 CU_{15}^{[1]}	February 8, 2002
(57413) 2001 SE^{[1]}	September 16, 2001
(57414) 2001 SJ^{[1]}	September 16, 2001
(57418) 2001 SE_{4}^{[1]}	September 18, 2001
(57421) 2001 SY_{8}^{[1]}	September 19, 2001
(57508) 2001 SN_{270}^{[1]}	September 27, 2001
(57517) 2001 SV_{285}^{[1]}	September 28, 2001
(57518) 2001 SB_{286}^{[1]}	September 28, 2001
(59097) 1998 WD_{5}	November 20, 1998
(59098) 1998 WN_{7}	November 20, 1998
(61146) 2000 NO_{10}	July 10, 2000
(61147) 2000 ND_{11}	July 10, 2000
(63883) 2001 SO^{[1]}	September 16, 2001
(63892) 2001 SX_{4}^{[1]}	September 18, 2001
(63896) 2001 SE_{9}^{[1]}	September 19, 2001
(64031) 2001 SV_{169}^{[1]}	September 24, 2001
(64060) 2001 SM_{263}^{[1]}	September 25, 2001
64070 NEAT^{[1]}	September 24, 2001
(64088) 2001 SX_{285}^{[1]}	September 28, 2001
(64839) 2001 YJ_{3}^{[1]}	December 19, 2001
(65099) 2002 CH_{13}^{[1]}	February 8, 2002

65100 Birtwhistle^{[1]}	February 8, 2002
(65101) 2002 CS_{15}^{[1]}	February 8, 2002
(65148) 2002 CE_{117}^{[1]}	February 11, 2002
68448 Sidneywolff^{[1]}	September 18, 2001
(68632) 2002 CN_{7}^{[1]}	February 6, 2002
(68635) 2002 CT_{15}^{[1]}	February 8, 2002
(68645) 2002 CQ_{52}^{[1]}	February 11, 2002
72949 Colesanti^{[1]}	February 12, 2002
77870 MOTESS^{[1]}	September 16, 2001
(77871) 2001 SC_{9}^{[1]}	September 19, 2001
(78070) 2002 LG_{5}^{[1]}	June 6, 2002
(78092) 2002 LD_{30}^{[1]}	June 10, 2002
(78928) 2003 SR_{128}^{[1]}	September 20, 2003
(81913) 2000 NX_{10}	July 10, 2000
83360 Catalina^{[1]}	September 16, 2001
(83361) 2001 SK^{[1]}	September 16, 2001
(83373) 2001 SA_{9}^{[1]}	September 19, 2001
(83374) 2001 SF_{9}^{[1]}	September 19, 2001
(83597) 2001 SU_{263}^{[1]}	September 25, 2001
(83604) 2001 SG_{270}^{[1]}	September 26, 2001
(83605) 2001 SJ_{270}^{[1]}	September 26, 2001
(83609) 2001 SE_{273}^{[1]}	September 24, 2001
(83987) 2002 LR_{32}^{[1]}	June 11, 2002
84342 Rubensdeazevedo^{[1]}	October 5, 2002
(88704) 2001 SF^{[1]}	September 16, 2001
(87138) 2000 NA_{11}	July 10, 2000
(88796) 2001 SB_{116}^{[1]}	September 22, 2001
(88880) 2001 SF_{270}^{[1]}	September 25, 2001
(88886) 2001 SA_{286}^{[1]}	September 28, 2001
(89831) 2002 CW_{4}^{[1]}	February 5, 2002
89956 Leibacher^{[1]}	June 6, 2002
(90453) 2004 CM^{[2]}	February 6, 2004
(95220) 2002 CQ_{15}^{[1]}	February 8, 2002
(95238) 2002 CH_{43}^{[1]}	February 12, 2002
(95461) 2002 DZ_{2}^{[1]}	February 21, 2002
(99447) 2002 CX_{25}^{[1]}	February 10, 2002
(99453) 2002 CW_{42}^{[1]}	February 12, 2002
(99454) 2002 CZ_{42}^{[1]}	February 12, 2002
(109878) 2001 SG^{[1]}	September 16, 2001
109879 Letelier^{[1]}	September 16, 2001
(109883) 2001 SC_{4}^{[1]}	September 18, 2001
(109886) 2001 SX_{8}^{[1]}	September 19, 2001
(110302) 2001 SM_{270}^{[1]}	September 26, 2001
(110325) 2001 SZ_{285}^{[1]}	September 28, 2001
(111467) 2001 YQ_{2}^{[1]}	December 19, 2001
(111699) 2002 CP_{15}^{[1]}	February 8, 2002
(111722) 2002 CF_{43}^{[1]}	February 12, 2002
(112245) 2002 LK_{5}^{[1]}	June 6, 2002
(112276) 2002 LK_{24}^{[1]}	June 7, 2002
(112292) 2002 LJ_{35}^{[1]}	June 12, 2002

(112658) 2002 PQ_{86}^{[1]}	August 13, 2002
(113618) 2002 TZ_{58}^{[1]}	October 4, 2002
(114325) 2002 XM_{59}^{[2]}	December 12, 2002
(114628) 2003 ET_{16}^{[2]}	March 8, 2003
(114753) 2003 HP_{42}^{[2]}	April 28, 2003
(115328) 2003 SR_{222}^{[1]}	September 28, 2003
(119836) 2002 CS_{12}^{[1]}	February 8, 2002
(119837) 2002 CY_{12}^{[1]}	February 8, 2002
123860 Davederrick^{[2]}	February 16, 2001
(124561) 2001 ST^{[1]}	September 17, 2001
(124562) 2001 SU^{[1]}	September 17, 2001
(126428) 2002 CU_{4}^{[1]}	February 5, 2002
(126473) 2002 CA_{43}^{[1]}	February 12, 2002
(127388) 2002 LF_{5}^{[1]}	June 6, 2002
131186 Pauluckas^{[2]}	February 16, 2001
(131500) 2001 SK_{270}^{[1]}	September 26, 2001
(131700) 2001 YN^{[1]}	December 17, 2001
(131898) 2002 BB_{1}^{[1]}	January 19, 2002
(131928) 2002 CV_{4}^{[1]}	February 5, 2002
(131933) 2002 CC_{13}^{[1]}	February 8, 2002
(131934) 2002 CF_{13}^{[1]}	February 8, 2002
(131960) 2002 CB_{43}^{[1]}	February 12, 2002
(131961) 2002 CD_{43}^{[1]}	February 12, 2002
(131967) 2002 CR_{52}^{[1]}	February 12, 2002
(135239) 2001 SH_{9}^{[1]}	September 19, 2001
(135532) 2002 CR_{12}^{[1]}	February 7, 2002
(135891) 2002 TU_{63}^{[1]}	October 4, 2002
(140261) 2001 SJ_{263}^{[1]}	September 25, 2001
(140265) 2001 SL_{270}^{[1]}	September 26, 2001
(141433) 2002 CX_{12}^{[1]}	February 8, 2002
(141443) 2002 CX_{42}^{[1]}	February 12, 2002
(141911) 2002 PQ_{79}^{[1]}	August 13, 2002
(142559) 2002 TO_{64}^{[1]}	October 5, 2002
(146548) 2001 SU_{285}^{[1]}	September 28, 2001
(149053) 2002 CW_{12}^{[1]}	February 8, 2002
(149307) 2002 UQ_{1}^{[1]}	October 28, 2002
(151292) 2002 CD_{13}^{[1]}	February 8, 2002
(154027) 2002 CU_{42}^{[1]}	February 12, 2002
(154028) 2002 CV_{42}^{[1]}	February 12, 2002
(154302) 2002 UQ_{3}^{[1]}	October 29, 2002
(156037) 2001 SQ^{[1]}	September 16, 2001
(158432) 2002 CJ_{13}^{[1]}	February 8, 2002
158520 Ricardoferreira^{[1]}	March 19, 2002
(159631) 2002 CA_{13}^{[1]}	February 8, 2002
(159717) 2003 AO_{8}^{[2]}	January 5, 2003
(159853) 2004 FK_{4}^{[2]}	March 20, 2004
(161006) 2002 EV_{2}^{[1]}	March 10, 2002
(161073) 2002 LH_{35}^{[1]}	June 12, 2002
(163341) 2002 LP_{32}^{[1]}	June 11, 2002
(163731) 2003 KD^{[2]}	May 20, 2003

(163733) 2003 KJ_{4}^{[2]}	May 20, 2003
(166372) 2002 LO_{32}^{[1]}	June 11, 2002
(169517) 2002 EW_{2}^{[1]}	March 10, 2002
(179808) 2002 TY_{69}^{[1]}	October 9, 2002
(182836) 2002 CM_{7}^{[1]}	February 6, 2002
(183563) 2003 MD_{4}^{[2]}	June 22, 2003
(188454) 2004 JK_{5}^{[2]}	May 12, 2004
(189693) 2001 SO_{270}^{[1]}	September 27, 2001
(194732) 2001 YL_{3}^{[1]}	December 19, 2001
(195009) 2002 CK_{13}^{[1]}	February 8, 2002
(196478) 2003 KC^{[2]}	May 20, 2003
(197208) 2003 WY_{7}^{[1]}	November 18, 2003
(197216) 2003 WR_{26}^{[2]}	November 20, 2003
(201161) 2002 LF_{35}^{[1]}	June 11, 2002
(201758) 2003 WC_{26}^{[2]}	November 21, 2003
(203532) 2002 CU_{12}^{[1]}	February 8, 2002
(206141) 2002 TA_{59}^{[1]}	October 4, 2002
(206314) 2003 KS_{9}^{[2]}	May 25, 2003
(208919) 2002 UW_{1}^{[1]}	October 28, 2002
(211045) 2002 CE_{43}^{[1]}	February 12, 2002
(213314) 2001 SG_{9}^{[1]}	September 19, 2001
(222753) 2002 CY_{25}^{[1]}	February 10, 2002
(222925) 2002 LQ_{32}^{[1]}	June 11, 2002
(223156) 2002 XP_{35}^{[1]}	December 7, 2002
(230530) 2002 XO_{35}^{[1]}	December 5, 2002
(240385) 2003 TV_{3}^{[1]}	October 1, 2003
(247264) 2001 SW_{8}^{[1]}	September 19, 2001
(250369) 2003 TY^{[1]}	October 4, 2003
(258197) 2001 SW_{285}^{[1]}	September 28, 2001
(286911) 2002 PR_{86}^{[1]}	August 13, 2002
(287351) 2002 US_{1}^{[1]}	October 28, 2002
(287655) 2003 MW_{2}^{[2]}	June 25, 2003
(287656) 2003 MF_{4}^{[2]}	June 23, 2003
(302367) 2002 CV_{12}^{[1]}	February 8, 2002
(302376) 2002 CG_{43}^{[1]}	February 12, 2002
(307101) 2002 CB_{13}^{[1]}	February 8, 2002
(307389) 2002 TY_{10}^{[1]}	October 3, 2002
(354312) 2002 UN_{1}^{[1]}	October 28, 2002
(359733) 2011 UY_{37}^{[2]}	June 1, 2010
(366154) 2012 EK_{15}^{[2]}	January 6, 2003
(366203) 2012 PQ_{13}^{[2]}	February 15, 2010
(387691) 2002 UV_{1}^{[1]}	October 28, 2002
(399536) 2003 MV_{2}^{[2]}	June 25, 2003
(405154) 2002 TN_{64}^{[1]}	October 5, 2002
(430689) 2003 XL_{10}^{[2]}	December 5, 2003
(463886) 2014 UO_{84}^{[2]}	February 22, 2001
(495856) 2003 KM_{11}^{[2]}	May 27, 2003
(541477) 2011 LK_{18}^{[2]}	6 June 2011
(541670) 2011 UQ_{332}^{[2]}	5 June 2010
(542143) 2012 XS_{54}^{[2]}	8 December 2012

(542230) 2013 AE_{102}^{[2]}	17 December 2012
(542247) 2013 AX_{133}^{[2]}	12 December 2012
(542366) 2013 CB_{62}^{[2]}	6 February 2013
(542456) 2013 CX_{184}^{[2]}	7 February 2013
(542499) 2013 DJ_{12}^{[2]}	5 February 2013
(542552) 2013 EH_{93}^{[2]}	12 March 2013
(542616) 2013 GM_{7}^{[2]}	12 March 2013
(542739) 2013 HW_{26}^{[2]}	12 April 2013
(542812) 2013 JU_{48}^{[2]}	14 May 2013
(542836) 2013 KV_{7}^{[2]}	31 May 2013
(542876) 2013 LG_{35}^{[2]}	17 April 2013
(543249) 2013 VC_{21}^{[2]}	15 October 2013
(543273) 2013 WA_{60}^{[2]}	26 November 2013
(543433) 2014 GY_{43}^{[2]}	23 May 2011
(543597) 2014 OY_{21}^{[2]}	2 October 2010
(544290) 2014 UM_{21}^{[2]}	14 May 2013
(544297) 2014 UJ_{34}^{[2]}	23 October 2014
(544406) 2014 UK_{203}^{[2]}	18 October 2014
(545454) 2011 KB_{13}^{[2]}	24 May 2011
(545455) 2011 KQ_{15}^{[2]}	27 May 2011
(545476) 2011 LW_{13}^{[2]}	3 June 2011
(545745) 2011 SV_{296}^{[2]}	15 January 2013
(545946) 2011 UM_{401}^{[2]}	17 June 2010
(547289) 2010 JF_{80}^{[2]}	12 May 2010
(547309) 2010 JC_{175}^{[2]}	12 May 2010
(547320) 2010 KH_{36}^{[2]}	17 May 2010
(547332) 2010 LN_{1}^{[2]}	4 June 2010
(547471) 2010 RG_{182}^{[2]}	2 October 2010
(548176) 2010 DD_{107}^{[2]}	7 November 2012
(548605) 2010 TR_{11}^{[2]}	2 October 2010
(549475) 2011 JQ_{30}^{[2]}	13 May 2011
(549488) 2011 KT_{3}^{[2]}	13 May 2011
(549496) 2011 KE_{13}^{[2]}	25 May 2011
(549498) 2011 KK_{17}^{[2]}	27 May 2011
(549538) 2011 LV_{13}^{[2]}	3 June 2011
(549539) 2011 LG_{14}^{[2]}	12 May 2011
(549542) 2011 LQ_{17}^{[2]}	8 June 2011
(549560) 2011 MP^{[2]}	23 June 2011
(549981) 2011 WC_{76}^{[2]}	14 June 2010
(550165) 2012 BY_{99}^{[2]}	8 March 2003
(550653) 2012 SJ_{29}^{[2]}	24 May 2011
(550670) 2012 SE_{65}^{[2]}	26 September 2012
(550771) 2012 TN_{134}^{[2]}	24 May 2011
(550880) 2012 TY_{318}^{[2]}	17 September 2012
(550975) 2012 UG_{134}^{[2]}	26 September 2012
(550975) 2012 UG_{134}^{[2]}	26 September 2012
(551001) 2012 UN_{170}^{[2]}	26 September 2012
(551025) 2012 UX_{194}^{[2]}	22 October 2012
(551100) 2012 VG_{116}^{[2]}	7 November 2012
(551137) 2012 XE_{16}^{[2]}	5 November 2012

(551146) 2012 XH_{44}^{[2]}	22 November 2012
(551159) 2012 XF_{67}^{[2]}	15 November 2012
(551176) 2012 XG_{103}^{[2]}	12 November 2012
(551189) 2012 XN_{137}^{[2]}	6 December 2012
(551248) 2013 AU_{50}^{[2]}	26 May 2011
(551259) 2013 AB_{67}^{[2]}	11 December 2012
(551288) 2013 AB_{102}^{[2]}	24 November 2012
(551500) 2013 ED_{33}^{[2]}	11 February 2013
(551501) 2013 EG_{33}^{[2]}	6 March 2013
(551536) 2013 EK_{107}^{[2]}	15 March 2013
(551592) 2013 GH_{18}^{[2]}	17 March 2013
(551648) 2013 GK_{130}^{[2]}	11 April 2013
(551649) 2013 GM_{130}^{[2]}	12 April 2013
(551670) 2013 HT^{[2]}	16 April 2013
(551674) 2013 HQ_{5}^{[2]}	21 November 2003
(551796) 2013 KC_{16}^{[2]}	31 May 2013
(551805) 2013 LK_{8}^{[2]}	16 May 2013
(551825) 2013 LK_{34}^{[2]}	17 May 2013
(552692) 2010 LP_{60}^{[2]}	4 June 2010
(553354) 2011 KH_{19}^{[2]}	28 May 2011
(553365) 2011 KR_{49}^{[2]}	22 May 2011
(554463) 2012 TF_{318}^{[2]}	14 October 2012
(554531) 2012 UU_{73}^{[2]}	25 September 2012
(554636) 2012 VQ_{61}^{[2]}	21 October 2012
(554714) 2012 XV_{113}^{[2]}	6 December 2012
(554715) 2012 XN_{115}^{[2]}	20 November 2012
(554729) 2012 XG_{142}^{[2]}	6 December 2012
(554778) 2013 AD_{176}^{[2]}	13 January 2013
(554816) 2013 CT_{49}^{[2]}	6 February 2013
(554825) 2013 CG_{64}^{[2]}	6 February 2013
(554835) 2013 CB_{123}^{[2]}	10 February 2013
(554886) 2013 EB_{91}^{[2]}	3 March 2013
(555004) 2013 LA_{31}^{[2]}	16 May 2013
(555319) 2013 VX_{28}^{[2]}	8 October 2012
(555347) 2013 WS_{1}^{[2]}	25 November 2013
(556706) 2014 QV_{391}^{[2]}	24 June 2011
(556767) 2014 QG_{474}^{[2]}	19 May 2013
(556812) 2014 RW_{12}^{[2]}	2 June 2013
(557407) 2014 UE_{164}^{[2]}	18 October 2014
(557476) 2014 UW_{233}^{[2]}	18 October 2014
(557904) 2014 WB_{364}^{[2]}	2 June 2013
(558125) 2014 XN_{4}^{[2]}	18 October 2014
(559519) 2015 DK_{64}^{[2]}	16 September 2012
(559656) 2015 DB_{131}^{[2]}	11 December 2013
(559666) 2015 DO_{139}^{[2]}	7 October 2013
(559785) 2015 DZ_{209}^{[2]}	11 November 2012
(559793) 2015 DY_{217}^{[2]}	16 September 2012
(560626) 2015 HJ_{75}^{[2]}	7 December 2012
(561083) 2015 PT_{231}^{[2]}	11 November 2012
(561156) 2015 RR_{29}^{[2]}	6 February 2013

(561232) 2015 RU_{122}^{[2]}	5 June 2011
(561819) 2015 VG_{100}^{[2]}	6 February 2013
(561908) 2015 VO_{159}^{[2]}	17 March 2013
(562690) 2016 AX_{168}^{[2]}	7 June 2013
(563580) 2016 CD_{315}^{[2]}	26 November 2013
(564687) 2016 LC_{7}^{[2]}	9 October 2012
(565135) 2017 BZ_{86}^{[2]}	7 February 2013
(565413) 2017 DQ_{80}^{[2]}	11 February 2013
(565583) 2017 FQ_{4}^{[2]}	6 February 2013
(565841) 2017 GG_{2}^{[2]}	10 May 2013
(565857) 2017 GY_{12}^{[2]}	22 March 2004
(566028) 2017 KM_{32}^{[2]}	26 October 2013
(566499) 2018 NG_{13}^{[2]}	24 May 2011
(566509) 2018 PE^{[2]}	21 May 2010
(568046) 2003 KU_{17}^{[2]}	27 May 2003
(568069) 2003 MC_{4}^{[2]}	26 June 2003
(568335) 2003 UB_{420}^{[2]}	10 October 2012
(568856) 2004 TR_{379}^{[2]}	28 November 2013
(570567) 2006 SR_{440}^{[2]}	18 December 2007
(571825) 2007 VH_{361}^{[2]}	6 December 2013
(573652) 2009 MR_{10}^{[2]}	13 December 2012
(574324) 2010 JQ_{1}^{[2]}	4 May 2010
(574378) 2010 JA_{211}^{[2]}	17 December 2012
(574397) 2010 LD_{16}^{[2]}	3 June 2010
(574409) 2010 LJ_{134}^{[2]}	12 June 2010
(575097) 2011 GX_{97}^{[2]}	10 November 2013
(575164) 2011 KM_{29}^{[2]}	21 May 2011
(575178) 2011 KJ_{57}^{[2]}	26 May 2011
(575205) 2011 MW_{11}^{[2]}	11 November 2012
(575891) 2011 WN_{164}^{[2]}	3 March 2013
(576306) 2012 LC_{27}^{[2]}	9 November 2013
(576503) 2012 TV_{17}^{[2]}	15 September 2012
(576615) 2012 TR_{255}^{[2]}	25 June 2011
(576636) 2012 TZ_{287}^{[2]}	10 October 2012
(576941) 2012 XV_{67}^{[2]}	5 December 2012
(577006) 2012 XJ_{142}^{[2]}	6 December 2012
(577283) 2013 CT_{63}^{[2]}	26 May 2003
(577284) 2013 CB_{68}^{[2]}	6 February 2013
(577291) 2013 CL_{80}^{[2]}	8 February 2013
(577485) 2013 EV_{118}^{[2]}	5 March 2013
(577868) 2013 SU_{29}^{[2]}	10 February 2004
(577961) 2013 TQ_{172}^{[2]}	7 October 2013
(578099) 2013 WE_{60}^{[2]}	26 November 2013
(578171) 2013 XP_{9}^{[2]}	6 December 2013
(578175) 2013 XK_{17}^{[2]}	4 December 2013
(578337) 2014 AV_{58}^{[2]}	1 January 2014
(579641) 2014 UW_{245}^{[2]}	23 October 2014
(579820) 2014 WL_{451}^{[2]}	23 October 2014
(579842) 2014 WS_{484}^{[2]}	19 October 2014
(580047) 2015 AU_{219}^{[2]}	28 December 2014

(581490) 2015 HQ_{86}^{[2]}	12 May 2011
(581814) 2015 KV_{170}^{[2]}	11 November 2012
(581886) 2015 LA_{46}^{[2]}	6 February 2013
(583684) 2016 NX_{9}^{[2]}	23 November 2012
(583907) 2016 QD_{3}^{[2]}	15 September 2012
(584354) 2017 AL_{5}^{[2]}	7 February 2013
(584415) 2017 DJ_{35}^{[2]}	9 January 2014
(584663) 2017 PV_{19}^{[2]}	25 November 2013
(584760) 2017 QM_{65}^{[2]}	7 December 2013
(585020) 2017 ST_{89}^{[2]}	29 November 2013
(585182) 2017 VZ_{10}^{[2]}	13 January 2013
(585442) 2018 QM_{1}^{[2]}	27 May 2011
(585445) 2018 RV_{9}^{[2]}	21 June 2011
(589043) 2009 BA_{196}^{[2]}	11 November 2012
(589208) 2009 MH_{12}^{[2]}	18 February 2013
(589644) 2010 KB_{148}^{[2]}	7 December 2013
(589999) 2011 BA_{29}^{[2]}	7 March 2003
(590137) 2011 KE_{12}^{[2]}	24 May 2011
(590771) 2012 TX_{138}^{[2]}	9 October 2012
(590813) 2012 TY_{306}^{[2]}	10 October 2012
(590815) 2012 TU_{311}^{[2]}	14 October 2012
(590860) 2012 UU_{133}^{[2]}	26 September 2012
(591324) 2013 HR_{42}	16 February 2001
(591352) 2013 JH_{48}^{[2]}	2 October 2010
(591521) 2013 WT_{1}^{[2]}	25 November 2013
(591565) 2013 XJ_{19}^{[2]}	6 November 2013
(591647) 2014 AT_{12}^{[2]}	25 November 2013
(593236) 2015 HW_{188}^{[2]}	7 December 2013
(594251) 2016 NY_{87}^{[2]}	26 September 2012
(594396) 2016 TB_{78}^{[2]}	11 February 2013
(594781) 2017 YT_{15}^{[2]}	1 January 2014
(595464) 2002 UB_{4}^{[2]}	28 October 2002
(595854) 2004 FD_{5}^{[2]}	22 March 2004
(595972) 2004 RB_{358}^{[2]}	17 September 2012
(599550) 2010 KW_{157}^{[2]}	17 May 2010
(600119) 2011 KM_{17}^{[2]}	29 May 2011
(600122) 2011 KU_{20}^{[2]}	11 May 2011
(600125) 2011 KF_{26}^{[2]}	23 May 2011
(600134) 2011 KB_{50}^{[2]}	27 May 2011
(600324) 2011 UD_{72}^{[2]}	5 June 2010
(600803) 2012 LH_{1}^{[2]}	9 June 2012
(600815) 2012 MM_{7}^{[2]}	9 June 2012
(600940) 2012 TK_{138}^{[2]}	8 October 2012
(601020) 2012 UF_{23}^{[2]}	17 September 2012
(601075) 2012 UU_{165}^{[2]}	23 May 2011
(601145) 2012 VT_{116}^{[2]}	15 November 2012
(601495) 2013 EZ_{126}^{[2]}	11 March 2013
(601892) 2013 WR^{[2]}	1 November 2013
(601908) 2013 WN_{56}^{[2]}	26 November 2013
(601917) 2013 WE_{104}^{[2]}	14 October 2013

(601953) 2013 YC_{74}^{[2]}	15 September 2012
(601980) 2014 AL^{[2]}	1 January 2014
(602032) 2014 BR_{55}^{[2]}	1 January 2014
(602420) 2014 JL_{73}^{[2]}	2 October 2010
(602536) 2014 LR_{33}^{[2]}	14 February 2013
(602684) 2014 OQ_{234}^{[2]}	13 March 2013
(602685) 2014 OQ_{237}^{[2]}	19 February 2013
(603152) 2014 YX_{54}^{[2]}	26 November 2013
(603371) 2015 BH_{590}^{[2]}	3 June 2011
(603407) 2015 DA^{[2]}	8 June 2011
(603638) 2015 FE_{174}^{[2]}	13 December 2013
(603806) 2015 GY_{8}^{[2]}	23 May 2011
(603907) 2015 HK_{93}^{[2]}	25 May 2011
(603984) 2015 HL_{217}^{[2]}	28 April 2015
(603991) 2015 JK_{11}^{[2]}	23 June 2010
(605425) 2016 JE_{24}^{[2]}	9 June 2012
(605617) 2016 QR_{33}^{[2]}	24 May 2011
(606201) 2017 QB_{60}^{[2]}	16 October 2014
(606398) 2017 WY_{10}^{[2]}	23 May 2011
(608147) 2003 MT_{7}^{[2]}	27 June 2003
(608637) 2003 WG_{42}^{[2]}	21 November 2003
(608746) 2003 YE_{184}^{[2]}	6 December 2012
(609353) 2005 AJ_{83}^{[2]}	6 November 2012
(609394) 2005 BL_{52}^{[2]}	27 February 2014
(615320) 2002 UA_{4}^{[2]}	28 October 2002
(615404) 2003 FM_{139}^{[2]}	24 May 2011
(615748) 2004 BQ_{165}^{[2]}	1 May 2013
(615765) 2004 CC_{8}^{[2]}	10 February 2004
(615795) 2004 EE_{11}^{[2]}	15 March 2004
(616743) 2000 AA_{259}^{[2]}	19 February 2013
(616775) 2000 JV_{96}^{[2]}	5 June 2011
(617196) 2003 WB_{88}^{[2]}	24 November 2003
(618614) 2002 EL_{167}^{[2]}	15 January 2013
(620543) 2005 BR_{52}^{[2]}	8 December 2012
(620588) 2005 MZ_{55}^{[2]}	9 June 2012
(622165) 2012 TX_{70}^{[2]}	9 October 2012
(622210) 2012 XE_{86}^{[2]}	14 November 2012
(622215) 2012 XW_{114}^{[2]}	6 December 2012
(622817) 2014 UZ_{244}^{[2]}	23 October 2014
(623630) 2016 WM_{11}^{[2]}	17 November 2012
(623778) 2018 XV_{17}^{[2]}	18 September 2012
(625875) 2006 SN_{425}^{[2]}	7 December 2012
(627542) 2008 XB_{62}^{[2]}	4 November 2013
(629101) 1999 PE_{9}^{[2]}	9 October 2012
(629821) 2003 YA_{183}^{[2]}	19 February 2004
(629874) 2004 DM_{34}^{[2]}	16 January 2004
(634360) 2011 LU^{[2]}	23 May 2011
(634459) 2011 SM_{159}^{[2]}	9 June 2010
(634920) 2012 TG_{215}^{[2]}	17 September 2012
(634923) 2012 TM_{223}^{[2]}	26 September 2012

(634951) 2012 TC_{312}^{[2]}	14 October 2012
(635012) 2012 UE_{135}^{[2]}	25 May 2011
(635043) 2012 VK_{33}^{[2]}	21 October 2012
(635058) 2012 VW_{99}^{[2]}	10 October 2012
(635069) 2012 WC_{27}^{[2]}	22 November 2012
(635106) 2012 XO_{117}^{[2]}	8 December 2012
(635231) 2013 CO_{54}^{[2]}	7 February 2013
(635234) 2013 CU_{68}^{[2]}	8 February 2013
(635584) 2013 WR_{61}^{[2]}	1 November 2013
(635620) 2013 YW_{49}^{[2]}	27 May 2011
(635879) 2014 FG_{67}^{[2]}	5 June 2003
(635905) 2014 HK_{3}^{[2]}	16 June 2010
(636042) 2014 MA_{36}^{[2]}	5 June 2010
(636071) 2014 NV_{59}^{[2]}	10 February 2004
(636653) 2014 VB_{26}^{[2]}	17 September 2012
(637554) 2015 HX_{126}^{[2]}	25 May 2003
(637643) 2015 KX_{65}^{[2]}	10 January 2014
(637714) 2015 LL_{34}^{[2]}	22 June 2011
(637777) 2015 NT_{12}^{[2]}	25 June 2011
(637810) 2015 OF_{67}^{[2]}	17 February 2001
(638146) 2015 TQ_{307}^{[2]}	7 February 2013
(638335) 2015 XW_{154}^{[2]}	14 February 2013
(638339) 2015 XA_{172}^{[2]}	5 June 2010
(638964) 2016 HZ_{19}^{[2]}	27 May 2011
(639027) 2016 NS_{71}^{[2]}	22 June 2011
(639225) 2016 XB_{7}^{[2]}	24 November 2012
(641571) 2004 DT_{85}^{[2]}	17 February 2004
(641597) 2004 FK_{31}^{[2]}	30 March 2004
(645992) 2007 XU_{61}^{[2]}	13 November 2012
(646637) 2008 EL_{173}^{[2]}	8 December 2012
(648845) 2010 LK^{[2]}	3 June 2010
(649540) 2011 KK_{4}^{[2]}	22 May 2011
(649542) 2011 KJ_{19}^{[2]}	28 May 2011
(649712) 2011 SH_{21}^{[2]}	21 May 2010
(650738) 2012 TR_{199}^{[2]}	11 October 2012
(650824) 2012 TZ_{310}^{[2]}	10 October 2012
(651094) 2012 VF_{69}^{[2]}	21 October 2012
(651126) 2012 VN_{117}^{[2]}	7 November 2012
(651143) 2012 WT_{3}^{[2]}	6 November 2012
(651160) 2012 WH_{35}^{[2]}	25 November 2012
(651171) 2012 XN^{[2]}	4 June 2010
(651198) 2012 XN_{34}^{[2]}	20 October 2012
(651424) 2013 AY_{122}^{[2]}	15 January 2013
(651556) 2013 CL_{68}^{[2]}	5 February 2013
(651693) 2013 DH_{16}^{[2]}	17 February 2013
(652534) 2014 CE_{25}^{[2]}	5 February 2014
(652758) 2014 EN_{140}^{[2]}	15 September 2012
(653236) 2014 MT_{13}^{[2]}	12 March 2013
(653561) 2014 QA_{365}^{[2]}	9 June 2011
(653590) 2014 QH_{442}^{[2]}	11 February 2013

(654549) 2015 BE_{485}^{[2]}	13 October 2013
(655311) 2015 JE_{8}^{[2]}	23 October 2012
(655498) 2015 MU_{78}^{[2]}	13 February 2013
(655745) 2015 PY_{299}^{[2]}	23 May 2011
(656129) 2015 VE_{202}^{[2]}	1 November 2015
(656354) 2016 AY_{118}^{[2]}	16 October 2014
(656949) 2016 FX_{33}^{[2]}	24 May 2011
(657728) 2016 UB_{148}^{[2]}	19 November 2012
(659048) 2018 RP_{18}^{[2]}	23 October 2014
(659495) 2019 HE_{1}^{[2]}	10 March 2013
(660176) 1999 TJ_{340}^{[2]}	4 October 2012
(660925) 2003 MB_{2}^{[2]}	24 June 2003
(662377) 2006 AE_{109}^{[2]}	7 December 2013
(667343) 2011 FB_{160}^{[2]}	13 October 2013
(667486) 2011 KC_{17}^{[2]}	24 May 2011
(667505) 2011 LE_{5}^{[2]}	23 May 2011
(668606) 2012 CL_{1}^{[2]}	2 October 2010
(668916) 2012 LP_{27}^{[2]}	10 June 2012
(669126) 2012 TC_{61}^{[2]}	16 September 2012
(669237) 2012 TS_{329}^{[2]}	11 October 2012
(669357) 2012 UW_{209}^{[2]}	26 January 2014
(669394) 2012 VM_{98}^{[2]}	23 October 2012
(669490) 2012 XH_{84}^{[2]}	7 December 2012
(669504) 2012 XV_{114}^{[2]}	6 December 2012
(669511) 2012 XP_{119}^{[2]}	8 December 2012
(669548) 2012 XL_{168}^{[2]}	11 December 2012
(669627) 2013 AJ_{96}^{[2]}	8 December 2012
(669733) 2013 BS_{71}^{[2]}	9 January 2013
(669827) 2013 CB_{102}^{[2]}	14 January 2013
(669945) 2013 CF_{258}^{[2]}	11 February 2013
(669971) 2013 EA_{24}^{[2]}	3 March 2013
(670065) 2013 FM_{10}^{[2]}	25 May 2003
(670294) 2013 LS_{15}^{[2]}	7 June 2013
(670657) 2013 WX_{41}^{[2]}	28 November 2013
(670692) 2013 WT_{117}^{[2]}	28 November 2013
(670819) 2014 AD_{58}^{[2]}	9 December 2012
(671176) 2014 HY_{25}^{[2]}	17 December 2012
(671523) 2014 MJ_{65}^{[2]}	14 March 2013
(671596) 2014 OQ_{2}^{[2]}	8 December 2012
(671633) 2014 OT_{83}^{[2]}	12 April 2013
(672704) 2014 WO_{300}^{[2]}	16 October 2014
(673521) 2015 DZ_{136}^{[2]}	5 December 2012
(673810) 2015 FX_{296}^{[2]}	3 June 2011
(673824) 2015 FR_{323}^{[2]}	23 May 2011
(674172) 2015 MA_{5}^{[2]}	10 January 2014
(674528) 2015 PR_{286}^{[2]}	23 May 2011
(674538) 2015 PA_{295}^{[2]}	17 March 2013
(676744) 2016 NB_{82}^{[2]}	31 May 2011
(676809) 2016 PH_{28}^{[2]}	8 November 2013
(677254) 2016 TV_{96}^{[2]}	17 December 2012

(677347) 2016 UA_{48}^{[2]}	12 November 2012
(677468) 2016 VW_{1}^{[2]}	28 May 2011
(677600) 2017 BM_{6}^{[2]}	27 January 2017
(677810) 2017 DB_{77}^{[2]}	4 June 2013
(677832) 2017 DL_{89}^{[2]}	17 February 2013
(678780) 2017 WX_{26}^{[2]}	30 December 2013
(678961) 2018 CQ_{10}^{[2]}	23 October 2012
(678978) 2018 EJ_{6}^{[2]}	6 March 2014
(679327) 2018 YH_{1}^{[2]}	8 December 2013
(679419) 2019 EC^{[2]}	8 December 2012
(684217) 2008 QB_{49}^{[2]}	3 January 2014
(687100) 2011 LF_{30}^{[2]}	21 October 2012
(688268) 2012 RL_{46}^{[2]}	30 October 2017
(688516) 2012 UZ_{72}^{[2]}	15 October 2012
(688795) 2012 XT_{171}^{[2]}	12 December 2012
(688801) 2012 YC^{[2]}	17 December 2012
(688921) 2013 BB_{18}^{[2]}	15 January 2013
(689046) 2013 CM_{113}^{[2]}	10 February 2013
(689427) 2013 GR_{88}^{[2]}	15 April 2013
(689519) 2013 HD_{24}^{[2]}	30 April 2013
(690001) 2013 VQ_{21}^{[2]}	13 October 2013
(690269) 2014 DQ_{103}^{[2]}	23 May 2011
(690415) 2014 FJ_{50}^{[2]}	4 June 2010
(690586) 2014 JN_{41}^{[2]}	8 February 2013
(693287) 2015 FX_{219}^{[2]}	13 October 2013
(693344) 2015 FB_{300}^{[2]}	22 October 2012
(694254) 2015 RN_{50}^{[2]}	13 December 2012
(694788) 2015 TR_{305}^{[2]}	15 January 2013
(696489) 2016 NF_{8}^{[2]}	12 November 2013
(696813) 2016 RM_{47}^{[2]}	11 October 2012
(699158) 2019 JQ_{32}^{[2]}	8 February 2013
(700379) 2001 SM_{358}^{[2]}	16 September 2012
(700441) 2001 XE_{269}^{[2]}	28 November 2013
(701147) 2003 YS_{185}^{[2]}	4 June 2013
(701729) 2005 JX_{192}^{[2]}	8 March 2014
(702916) 2006 UL_{370}^{[2]}	7 March 2013
(706329) 2009 WV_{283}^{[2]}	7 December 2013
(706625) 2010 LY_{104}^{[2]}	6 June 2010
(707575) 2011 JH_{15}^{[2]}	11 May 2011
(707595) 2011 KW_{27}^{[2]}	24 May 2011
(707646) 2011 MP_{6}^{[2]}	20 June 2011
(708965) 2012 TA_{2}^{[2]}	4 October 2012
(708978) 2012 TT_{67}^{[2]}	8 October 2012
(709058) 2012 TV_{331}^{[2]}	14 October 2012
(709122) 2012 UT_{133}^{[2]}	10 October 2012
(709197) 2012 VV_{101}^{[2]}	11 November 2012
(709223) 2012 WN_{16}^{[2]}	12 November 2012
(709290) 2012 XK_{110}^{[2]}	13 November 2012
(709292) 2012 XO_{116}^{[2]}	8 December 2012
(709297) 2012 XS_{133}^{[2]}	22 November 2012

(709308) 2012 XH_{150}^{[2]}	8 December 2012
(709326) 2012 YV_{10}^{[2]}	11 February 2004
(709604) 2013 CY_{180}^{[2]}	11 February 2013
(709607) 2013 CY_{183}^{[2]}	6 February 2013
(709756) 2013 EY_{174}^{[2]}	7 March 2013
(709863) 2013 HS_{1}^{[2]}	16 April 2013
(709948) 2013 JV_{53}^{[2]}	7 April 2013
(709995) 2013 LH_{33}^{[2]}	6 June 2013
(709996) 2013 LC_{34}^{[2]}	1 June 2013
(710629) 2014 BQ_{24}^{[2]}	23 September 2012
(710708) 2014 DC_{77}^{[2]}	6 February 2013
(710963) 2014 HH_{22}^{[2]}	2 June 2010
(710971) 2014 HE_{42}^{[2]}	7 December 2012
(710978) 2014 HD_{53}^{[2]}	13 December 2012
(713705) 2015 FS_{69}^{[2]}	23 October 2012
(714008) 2015 HB_{144}^{[2]}	26 May 2011
(714014) 2015 HH_{151}^{[2]}	22 May 2011
(714879) 2015 RE_{104}^{[2]}	25 May 2011
(714891) 2015 RP_{132}^{[2]}	8 June 2011
(715094) 2015 TM_{114}^{[2]}	11 April 2013
(715275) 2015 TH_{375}^{[2]}	9 October 2015
(716061) 2016 AL_{144}^{[2]}	18 October 2014
(717240) 2016 QU_{74}^{[2]}	17 September 2012
(717321) 2016 SY_{3}^{[2]}	24 September 2012
(717326) 2016 SO_{8}^{[2]}	19 September 2012
(717332) 2016 SS_{18}^{[2]}	6 November 2012
(717389) 2016 TT_{35}^{[2]}	18 December 2012
(717610) 2016 VF_{7}^{[2]}	13 December 2012
(718605) 2017 OT_{27}^{[2]}	3 June 2010
(718611) 2017 OU_{45}^{[2]}	16 June 2012
(719212) 2018 QT_{6}^{[2]}	14 October 2013
(719901) 2021 QB_{49}^{[2]}	14 October 2012
(721769) 2004 EG_{44}^{[2]}	14 March 2004
(725233) 2008 UA_{381}^{[2]}	29 January 2014
(727802) 2010 JY_{180}^{[2]}	7 February 2013
(728056) 2010 LT_{15}^{[2]}	3 June 2010
(730619) 2012 OA_{4}^{[2]}	25 May 2011
(730909) 2012 UY_{158}	26 September 2012
(731096) 2013 AL_{66}^{[2]}	8 December 2012
(731266) 2013 CP_{90}^{[2]}	7 February 2013
(731609) 2013 LK_{15}^{[2]}	17 May 2013
(732042) 2013 WW_{17}^{[2]}	25 May 2003
(732159) 2013 YS_{88}^{[2]}	9 March 2003
(732346) 2014 DH_{111}^{[2]}	5 February 2014
(734337) 2014 YS_{58}^{[2]}	11 October 2013
(734656) 2015 BW_{148}^{[2]}	2 November 2013
(735449) 2015 GM_{34}^{[2]}	4 June 2011
(735451) 2015 GV_{36}^{[2]}	14 March 2004
(735583) 2015 HG_{204}^{[2]}	23 May 2011
(736053) 2015 PE_{68}^{[2]}	22 January 2002

(738707) 2016 YK_{7}^{[2]}	9 March 2003
(740143) 2001 DN_{114}^{[2]}	7 December 2012
(741561) 2006 HT_{156}^{[2]}	21 October 2012
(742804) 2007 XM_{18}^{[2]}	7 December 2007
(742836) 2007 YX_{29}^{[2]}	29 December 2007
(743715) 2008 VN_{84}^{[2]}	9 October 2013
(744981) 2010 JM_{71}^{[2]}	11 May 2010
(745011) 2010 KL_{62}^{[2]}	21 May 2010
(745014) 2010 LJ^{[2]}	3 June 2010
(745017) 2010 LC_{61}^{[2]}	12 June 2010
(745804) 2011 KP_{4}^{[2]}	23 May 2011
(745828) 2011 KG_{53}^{[2]}	27 May 2011
(745841) 2011 LR_{14}^{[2]}	5 June 2011
(746446) 2011 VZ_{29}^{[2]}	10 February 2013
(747170) 2012 TR_{15}^{[2]}	16 September 2012
(747248) 2012 TD_{216}^{[2]}	17 September 2012
(747301) 2012 TM_{310}^{[2]}	13 October 2012
(747303) 2012 TP_{312}^{[2]}	14 October 2012
(747359) 2012 UG_{30}^{[2]}	26 September 2012
(747387) 2012 UE_{98}^{[2]}	18 October 2012
(747582) 2012 WW_{35}^{[2]}	13 October 2012
(747629) 2012 XW_{67}^{[2]}	20 November 2012
(747684) 2012 XV_{164}^{[2]}	12 December 2012
(747689) 2012 XX_{168}^{[2]}	8 December 2012
(747716) 2012 YX_{19}^{[2]}	20 December 2012
(747728) 2013 AH_{24}^{[2]}	23 November 2012
(747887) 2013 BC_{97}^{[2]}	31 January 2013
(747920) 2013 CS_{65}^{[2]}	5 February 2013
(747985) 2013 CW_{184}^{[2]}	7 February 2013
(747986) 2013 CY_{184}^{[2]}	7 February 2013
(748009) 2013 CU_{226}^{[2]}	11 February 2013
(748129) 2013 GT_{13}^{[2]}	18 March 2013
(748150) 2013 GV_{84}^{[2]}	11 April 2013
(748245) 2013 KB_{16}^{[2]}	16 May 2013
(748846) 2013 YK_{92}^{[2]}	28 November 2013
(749115) 2014 EW_{214}^{[2]}	20 October 2012
(749146) 2014 FP_{28}^{[2]}	11 November 2012
(750386) 2014 UB_{33}^{[2]}	6 March 2013
(750849) 2014 YP_{35}^{[2]}	21 October 2014
(751177) 2015 BB_{255}^{[2]}	26 May 2003
(751705) 2015 FY_{334}^{[2]}	24 May 2011
(752899) 2015 TH_{277}^{[2]}	14 February 2013
(754278) 2016 NP_{50}^{[2]}	6 November 2012
(754323) 2016 OC_{1}^{[2]}	20 November 2012
(754785) 2016 UT_{26}^{[2]}	19 November 2012
(754808) 2016 UW_{44}^{[2]}	24 September 2012
(755155) 2017 AB_{20}^{[2]}	5 March 2013
(755610) 2017 FP_{141}^{[2]}	7 April 2013
(755735) 2017 OC_{63}^{[2]}	1 June 2013
(760897) 2009 CH_{68}^{[2]}	6 November 2012

(763808) 2012 PH_{46}^{[2]}	27 February 2014
(764037) 2012 TU_{249}^{[2]}	8 October 2012
(764052) 2012 TY_{283}^{[2]}	15 October 2012
(764092) 2012 TM_{358}^{[2]}	4 October 2012
(765269) 2013 TV_{208}^{[2]}	29 October 2002
(765318) 2013 UL_{23}^{[2]}	25 October 2013
(765916) 2014 DV_{8}^{[2]}	5 February 2014
(767332) 2014 UD_{9}^{[2]}	16 October 2014
(771946) 2017 BN_{14}^{[2]}	10 February 2013
(772520) 2017 QO_{67}^{[2]}	17 September 2012
(780314) 2012 SD_{74}^{[2]}	23 September 2012
(780462) 2012 TG_{318}^{[2]}	21 September 2012
(780551) 2012 UK_{27}^{[2]}	8 October 2012
(780826) 2012 XT_{115}^{[2]}	7 December 2012
(780888) 2013 AQ_{6}^{[2]}	17 December 2012
(780890) 2013 AS_{9}^{[2]}	17 December 2012
(781140) 2013 CW_{207}^{[2]}	14 February 2013
(781198) 2013 DD_{18}^{[2]}	18 February 2013
(781449) 2013 JQ_{69}^{[2]}	2 May 2013
(793391) 2003 LA_{5}^{[2]}	2 June 2003
(799043) 2013 CP_{63}^{[2]}	7 February 2013
(799368) 2013 KF_{20}^{[2]}	31 May 2013
(799924) 2013 WN_{10}^{[2]}	26 November 2013
(801526) 2014 UZ_{6}^{[2]}	19 October 2014
(804610) 2016 AR_{209}^{[2]}	13 May 2011
(805282) 2016 DX_{39}^{[2]}	16 February 2016
(807342) 2017 KU_{8}^{[2]}	1 June 2013
(807389) 2017 MK_{1}^{[2]}	1 March 2004
(811696) 2000 YM_{144}^{[2]}	28 December 2013
(812021) 2003 OJ_{35}^{[2]}	8 December 2012
(812310) 2004 RV_{357}^{[2]}	11 October 2013
(812376) 2004 TO_{381}^{[2]}	4 June 2010
(812892) 2006 AL_{109}^{[2]}	28 November 2013
(816496) 2011 KL_{59}^{[2]}	23 May 2011
(817586) 2012 SV_{96}^{[2]}	16 September 2012
(817598) 2012 TV_{25}^{[2]}	18 September 2012
(817685) 2012 TQ_{307}^{[2]}	17 September 2012
(817688) 2012 TT_{320}^{[2]}	26 September 2012
(817856) 2012 VY_{99}^{[2]}	11 November 2012
(817908) 2012 XA_{54}^{[2]}	7 December 2012
(817937) 2012 XS_{156}^{[2]}	13 December 2012
(817946) 2012 XD_{175}^{[2]}	8 December 2012
(818059) 2013 CM_{136}^{[2]}	7 February 2013
(818665) 2013 VE_{32}^{[2]}	11 November 2013
(818731) 2013 WZ_{106}^{[2]}	1 November 2013
(823745) 2016 LD_{44}^{[2]}	16 September 2012
(824110) 2016 SR_{8}^{[2]}	11 December 2012
(825313) 2017 XT_{20}^{[2]}	24 November 2012
(828016) 2003 EX_{53}^{[2]}	11 March 2003
(833791) 2010 LT_{61}^{[2]}	4 June 2010

(834755) 2010 TE_{175}^{[2]}	2 October 2010
(835399) 2011 KL_{17}^{[2]}	28 May 2011
(835401) 2011 KV_{23}^{[2]}	26 May 2011
(835415) 2011 LL_{13}^{[2]}	1 June 2011
(836036) 2012 BT_{168}^{[2]}	1 June 2013
(836931) 2012 VT_{137}^{[2]}	11 November 2012
(837041) 2013 AC_{1}^{[2]}	25 December 2012
(837157) 2013 CE_{128}^{[2]}	14 February 2013
(837194) 2013 CQ_{258}^{[2]}	13 February 2013
(837420) 2013 LH_{36}^{[2]}	6 June 2013
(838405) 2014 GA_{51}^{[2]}	8 March 2014
(839855) 2014 UX_{51}^{[2]}	22 October 2014
(843700) 2016 NC_{42}^{[2]}	26 September 2012
(844111) 2016 SS_{38}^{[2]}	7 November 2012
(844434) 2016 XY_{4}^{[2]}	9 December 2012
(845175) 2017 SP_{106}^{[2]}	20 September 2017
(845487) 2017 VW_{36}^{[2]}	22 June 2011
(848020) 2002 UE_{11}^{[2]}	28 October 2002
(848021) 2002 UP_{12}^{[2]}	31 October 2002
(848738) 2004 TE_{380}^{[2]}	27 May 2011
(855392) 2011 BC_{204}^{[2]}	14 February 2008
(855825) 2011 KM_{13}^{[2]}	23 May 2011
(855852) 2011 LO_{2}^{[2]}	3 June 2011
(855885) 2011 MO_{14}^{[2]}	22 June 2011
(857732) 2012 TY_{6}^{[2]}	5 October 2012
(857797) 2012 TU_{100}^{[2]}	8 October 2012
(857821) 2012 TH_{132}^{[2]}	22 September 2012
(857917) 2012 TS_{282}^{[2]}	13 October 2012
(857918) 2012 TA_{283}^{[2]}	14 October 2012
(858018) 2012 TC_{387}^{[2]}	8 October 2012
(858406) 2012 WX_{28}^{[2]}	20 November 2012
(858449) 2012 XT_{50}^{[2]}	10 October 2012
(858532) 2012 XQ_{167}^{[2]}	9 December 2012
(858761) 2013 CR_{21}^{[2]}	14 January 2013
(858810) 2013 CP_{183}^{[2]}	6 February 2013
(858832) 2013 CU_{229}^{[2]}	11 February 2013
(858844) 2013 CU_{238}^{[2]}	10 February 2013
(858939) 2013 EQ_{92}^{[2]}	7 March 2013
(858966) 2013 EP_{162}^{[2]}	3 March 2013
(859328) 2013 LK_{1}^{[2]}	16 April 2013
(859351) 2013 LT_{36}^{[2]}	1 June 2013
(860244) 2013 XV_{19}^{[2]}	11 December 2013
(860486) 2014 BS_{75}^{[2]}	26 January 2014
(863414) 2014 TR_{96}^{[2]}	15 October 2014
(863515) 2014 UO_{56}^{[2]}	23 October 2014
(864053) 2014 WC_{304}^{[2]}	16 October 2014
(864390) 2014 YX_{8}^{[2]}	29 May 2011
(868826) 2016 GX_{240}^{[2]}	11 May 2011
(869277) 2016 PO_{61}^{[2]}	17 September 2012
(869341) 2016 PT_{118}^{[2]}	10 October 2012

(870230) 2016 WU_{29}^{[2]}	8 December 2012
(870475) 2017 BJ_{49}^{[2]}	3 December 2012
(871308) 2017 QJ^{[2]}	20 December 2012
(871832) 2017 VL_{8}^{[2]}	2 October 2010
(874470) 2020 VZ_{25}^{[2]}	15 October 2014
(877901) 2011 KW_{50}^{[2]}	28 May 2011
(883249) 2016 OD_{2}^{[2]}	24 September 2012
(884226) 2017 EP_{5}^{[2]}	1 June 2013
1. ^{1} with C. W. Juels; 2. ^{2} with M. B. Schwartz

== See also ==
- List of astronomers § P. Holvorcem
