= List of minor planets: 517001–518000 =

The following is a partial list of minor planets, running from minor-planet number 517001 through 518000, inclusive. The primary data for this and other partial lists is based on JPL's "Small-Body Orbital Elements" and data available from the Minor Planet Center. Critical list information is also provided by the MPC, unless otherwise specified from Lowell Observatory. A detailed description of the table's columns and additional sources are given on the main page including a complete list of every page in this series, and a statistical break-up on the dynamical classification of minor planets.

Also see the summary list of all named bodies in numerical and alphabetical order, and the corresponding naming citations for the number range of this particular list. New namings may only be added to this list after official publication, as the preannouncement of names is condemned by the Working Group for Small Bodies Nomenclature of the International Astronomical Union.

Near-Earth obj.	MBA (inner)	MBA (outer)	Centaur
Mars-crosser	MBA (middle)	Jupiter trojan	Trans-Neptunian obj.
Unclassified

== 517001–517100 ==
Designation			Discovery			Properties		Ref
Permanent	Provisional	Named after	Date	Site	Discoverer(s)	Category	Diam.	Ref
517001	2012 TE_{54}	—	October 23, 2008	Kitt Peak	Spacewatch	·	1.1 km	MPC · JPL
517002	2012 TE_{64}	—	September 12, 2001	Socorro	LINEAR	PHO	690 m	MPC · JPL
517003	2012 TW_{83}	—	October 29, 2005	Kitt Peak	Spacewatch	NYS	870 m	MPC · JPL
517004	2012 TT_{104}	—	September 1, 2005	Kitt Peak	Spacewatch	·	550 m	MPC · JPL
517005	2012 TV_{123}	—	October 11, 2012	Catalina	CSS	·	1.4 km	MPC · JPL
517006	2012 TH_{137}	—	March 15, 2007	Mount Lemmon	Mount Lemmon Survey	·	950 m	MPC · JPL
517007	2012 TQ_{212}	—	January 31, 2006	Kitt Peak	Spacewatch	·	970 m	MPC · JPL
517008	2012 TA_{261}	—	October 7, 2012	Haleakala	Pan-STARRS 1	V	780 m	MPC · JPL
517009	2012 TY_{295}	—	November 8, 2009	Kitt Peak	Spacewatch	·	720 m	MPC · JPL
517010	2012 TN_{299}	—	October 6, 2012	Mount Lemmon	Mount Lemmon Survey	V	600 m	MPC · JPL
517011	2012 TZ_{307}	—	October 10, 2012	Mount Lemmon	Mount Lemmon Survey	·	1.3 km	MPC · JPL
517012	2012 TW_{313}	—	September 18, 2012	Mount Lemmon	Mount Lemmon Survey	·	1.1 km	MPC · JPL
517013	2012 TS_{326}	—	October 30, 2008	Mount Lemmon	Mount Lemmon Survey	·	1.6 km	MPC · JPL
517014	2012 TZ_{326}	—	October 9, 2012	Mount Lemmon	Mount Lemmon Survey	·	2.0 km	MPC · JPL
517015	2012 TA_{327}	—	October 31, 2008	Kitt Peak	Spacewatch	MAR	900 m	MPC · JPL
517016	2012 UW_{67}	—	October 15, 2012	Siding Spring	SSS	BAR	1.3 km	MPC · JPL
517017	2012 UB_{73}	—	October 15, 2012	Mount Lemmon	Mount Lemmon Survey	·	660 m	MPC · JPL
517018	2012 UT_{81}	—	August 24, 2008	La Sagra	OAM	MAS	810 m	MPC · JPL
517019	2012 UL_{86}	—	June 30, 2008	Kitt Peak	Spacewatch	·	750 m	MPC · JPL
517020	2012 UZ_{89}	—	October 21, 2012	Haleakala	Pan-STARRS 1	·	1.3 km	MPC · JPL
517021	2012 US_{98}	—	October 10, 2012	Kitt Peak	Spacewatch	·	1.3 km	MPC · JPL
517022	2012 UW_{146}	—	October 19, 2012	Haleakala	Pan-STARRS 1	·	1.2 km	MPC · JPL
517023	2012 UB_{152}	—	November 19, 2008	Kitt Peak	Spacewatch	(5)	900 m	MPC · JPL
517024	2012 UE_{169}	—	October 6, 2012	Haleakala	Pan-STARRS 1	·	1.2 km	MPC · JPL
517025	2012 UU_{179}	—	December 22, 2008	Mount Lemmon	Mount Lemmon Survey	·	1.2 km	MPC · JPL
517026	2012 UW_{179}	—	September 23, 2006	Kitt Peak	Spacewatch	ANF	1.5 km	MPC · JPL
517027	2012 VM_{12}	—	April 11, 2007	Kitt Peak	Spacewatch	·	1.1 km	MPC · JPL
517028	2012 VN_{14}	—	August 21, 2008	Kitt Peak	Spacewatch	·	1.0 km	MPC · JPL
517029	2012 VL_{16}	—	October 8, 2012	Mount Lemmon	Mount Lemmon Survey	(2076)	750 m	MPC · JPL
517030	2012 VR_{60}	—	November 4, 2005	Kitt Peak	Spacewatch	·	840 m	MPC · JPL
517031	2012 VZ_{91}	—	November 14, 2012	Kitt Peak	Spacewatch	(5)	910 m	MPC · JPL
517032	2012 XB_{47}	—	October 12, 2007	Kitt Peak	Spacewatch	·	2.0 km	MPC · JPL
517033	2012 XZ_{83}	—	December 6, 2012	Mount Lemmon	Mount Lemmon Survey	HNS	1.2 km	MPC · JPL
517034	2012 XH_{97}	—	November 22, 2012	Kitt Peak	Spacewatch	·	880 m	MPC · JPL
517035	2012 XS_{119}	—	November 13, 2007	Catalina	CSS	·	450 m	MPC · JPL
517036	2012 XW_{145}	—	October 9, 2004	Kitt Peak	Spacewatch	V	680 m	MPC · JPL
517037	2012 XU_{158}	—	December 1, 2008	Mount Lemmon	Mount Lemmon Survey	MAR	1.2 km	MPC · JPL
517038	2012 YG_{10}	—	December 22, 2012	Haleakala	Pan-STARRS 1	·	2.5 km	MPC · JPL
517039	2013 AG_{7}	—	January 3, 2013	Mount Lemmon	Mount Lemmon Survey	·	1.6 km	MPC · JPL
517040	2013 AT_{7}	—	January 3, 2013	Mount Lemmon	Mount Lemmon Survey	·	1.7 km	MPC · JPL
517041	2013 AQ_{21}	—	January 3, 2013	Haleakala	Pan-STARRS 1	·	1.8 km	MPC · JPL
517042	2013 AU_{23}	—	March 22, 2009	Catalina	CSS	·	1.7 km	MPC · JPL
517043	2013 AH_{28}	—	October 12, 2007	Catalina	CSS	JUN	1.3 km	MPC · JPL
517044	2013 AG_{29}	—	May 24, 2010	WISE	WISE	·	3.5 km	MPC · JPL
517045	2013 AN_{40}	—	January 5, 2013	Kitt Peak	Spacewatch	·	1.1 km	MPC · JPL
517046	2013 AA_{53}	—	January 7, 2013	Haleakala	Pan-STARRS 1	APO	440 m	MPC · JPL
517047	2013 AN_{57}	—	December 29, 2003	Kitt Peak	Spacewatch	·	1.3 km	MPC · JPL
517048	2013 AJ_{58}	—	January 6, 2013	Kitt Peak	Spacewatch	·	1.5 km	MPC · JPL
517049	2013 AF_{85}	—	January 31, 2009	Mount Lemmon	Mount Lemmon Survey	·	1.7 km	MPC · JPL
517050	2013 AU_{85}	—	December 23, 2012	Haleakala	Pan-STARRS 1	·	1.2 km	MPC · JPL
517051	2013 AN_{101}	—	December 12, 2012	Mount Lemmon	Mount Lemmon Survey	·	1.5 km	MPC · JPL
517052	2013 AO_{104}	—	December 8, 2012	Mount Lemmon	Mount Lemmon Survey	·	2.1 km	MPC · JPL
517053	2013 AC_{105}	—	October 26, 2011	Haleakala	Pan-STARRS 1	·	2.3 km	MPC · JPL
517054	2013 AL_{108}	—	March 9, 2005	Mount Lemmon	Mount Lemmon Survey	·	1.3 km	MPC · JPL
517055	2013 AX_{108}	—	January 10, 2013	Haleakala	Pan-STARRS 1	·	1.1 km	MPC · JPL
517056	2013 AX_{131}	—	February 9, 1999	Kitt Peak	Spacewatch	·	2.2 km	MPC · JPL
517057	2013 AW_{134}	—	January 2, 2009	Mount Lemmon	Mount Lemmon Survey	·	1.2 km	MPC · JPL
517058	2013 AX_{169}	—	February 26, 2009	Kitt Peak	Spacewatch	ADE	1.3 km	MPC · JPL
517059	2013 AK_{171}	—	October 16, 2007	Kitt Peak	Spacewatch	·	1.2 km	MPC · JPL
517060	2013 AW_{184}	—	February 1, 2009	Kitt Peak	Spacewatch	·	1.1 km	MPC · JPL
517061	2013 CU_{12}	—	April 21, 2009	Mount Lemmon	Mount Lemmon Survey	MRX	960 m	MPC · JPL
517062	2013 CP_{20}	—	January 19, 2013	Mount Lemmon	Mount Lemmon Survey	·	1.9 km	MPC · JPL
517063	2013 CV_{21}	—	October 24, 2011	Haleakala	Pan-STARRS 1	AEO	1.1 km	MPC · JPL
517064	2013 CM_{36}	—	February 8, 2013	Haleakala	Pan-STARRS 1	·	1.4 km	MPC · JPL
517065	2013 CT_{40}	—	March 29, 2009	Catalina	CSS	JUN	950 m	MPC · JPL
517066	2013 CH_{41}	—	October 31, 2011	Mount Lemmon	Mount Lemmon Survey	·	1.9 km	MPC · JPL
517067	2013 CB_{45}	—	December 16, 2007	Kitt Peak	Spacewatch	·	1.6 km	MPC · JPL
517068	2013 CU_{47}	—	December 31, 2007	Kitt Peak	Spacewatch	·	1.9 km	MPC · JPL
517069	2013 CH_{57}	—	February 7, 2013	Catalina	CSS	·	2.8 km	MPC · JPL
517070	2013 CX_{57}	—	March 26, 2009	Mount Lemmon	Mount Lemmon Survey	ADE	1.9 km	MPC · JPL
517071	2013 CX_{69}	—	January 19, 2013	Kitt Peak	Spacewatch	·	1.9 km	MPC · JPL
517072	2013 CS_{70}	—	April 7, 2005	Kitt Peak	Spacewatch	·	1.5 km	MPC · JPL
517073	2013 CE_{75}	—	February 5, 2013	Kitt Peak	Spacewatch	·	1.7 km	MPC · JPL
517074	2013 CT_{77}	—	January 5, 2013	Kitt Peak	Spacewatch	·	1.7 km	MPC · JPL
517075	2013 CJ_{90}	—	April 20, 2009	Kitt Peak	Spacewatch	·	1.8 km	MPC · JPL
517076	2013 CT_{90}	—	January 19, 2004	Kitt Peak	Spacewatch	·	1.3 km	MPC · JPL
517077	2013 CK_{93}	—	February 8, 2013	Haleakala	Pan-STARRS 1	·	1.5 km	MPC · JPL
517078	2013 CD_{95}	—	February 8, 2013	Haleakala	Pan-STARRS 1	·	1.3 km	MPC · JPL
517079	2013 CZ_{97}	—	September 24, 2011	Haleakala	Pan-STARRS 1	·	1.5 km	MPC · JPL
517080	2013 CG_{102}	—	February 9, 2013	Haleakala	Pan-STARRS 1	·	1.5 km	MPC · JPL
517081	2013 CF_{108}	—	February 9, 2013	Haleakala	Pan-STARRS 1	·	1.7 km	MPC · JPL
517082	2013 CN_{109}	—	September 26, 2006	Mount Lemmon	Mount Lemmon Survey	·	1.5 km	MPC · JPL
517083	2013 CC_{110}	—	April 2, 2009	Kitt Peak	Spacewatch	·	1.5 km	MPC · JPL
517084	2013 CP_{117}	—	May 16, 2009	Kitt Peak	Spacewatch	DOR	2.1 km	MPC · JPL
517085	2013 CU_{125}	—	January 11, 2008	Mount Lemmon	Mount Lemmon Survey	·	1.8 km	MPC · JPL
517086	2013 CX_{135}	—	December 23, 2012	Mount Lemmon	Mount Lemmon Survey	HNS	1.2 km	MPC · JPL
517087	2013 CE_{148}	—	October 19, 2011	Kitt Peak	Spacewatch	·	1.4 km	MPC · JPL
517088	2013 CA_{156}	—	February 8, 2013	Kitt Peak	Spacewatch	·	1.9 km	MPC · JPL
517089	2013 CV_{159}	—	April 25, 2004	Kitt Peak	Spacewatch	·	1.3 km	MPC · JPL
517090	2013 CX_{164}	—	February 5, 2013	Kitt Peak	Spacewatch	AGN	990 m	MPC · JPL
517091	2013 CN_{175}	—	October 26, 2011	Haleakala	Pan-STARRS 1	·	1.8 km	MPC · JPL
517092	2013 CH_{180}	—	November 20, 2007	Mount Lemmon	Mount Lemmon Survey	·	1.4 km	MPC · JPL
517093	2013 CJ_{184}	—	September 4, 2011	Haleakala	Pan-STARRS 1	·	1.9 km	MPC · JPL
517094	2013 CC_{205}	—	September 4, 2010	Mount Lemmon	Mount Lemmon Survey	·	1.8 km	MPC · JPL
517095	2013 CJ_{214}	—	February 8, 2013	Haleakala	Pan-STARRS 1	·	1.5 km	MPC · JPL
517096	2013 CT_{214}	—	April 12, 2004	Kitt Peak	Spacewatch	·	1.8 km	MPC · JPL
517097	2013 CP_{222}	—	October 25, 2011	Haleakala	Pan-STARRS 1	(18466)	2.7 km	MPC · JPL
517098	2013 CP_{224}	—	February 12, 2008	Mount Lemmon	Mount Lemmon Survey	·	2.0 km	MPC · JPL
517099	2013 CQ_{224}	—	November 23, 2002	Palomar	NEAT	MRX	890 m	MPC · JPL
517100	2013 DS_{13}	—	March 29, 2004	Kitt Peak	Spacewatch	DOR	1.7 km	MPC · JPL

== 517101–517200 ==
back to top

Designation			Discovery			Properties		Ref
Permanent	Provisional	Named after	Date	Site	Discoverer(s)	Category	Diam.	Ref
517101	2013 EM_{3}	—	October 20, 2006	Kitt Peak	Spacewatch	·	2.0 km	MPC · JPL
517102	2013 ET_{19}	—	March 5, 2013	Haleakala	Pan-STARRS 1	·	1.9 km	MPC · JPL
517103	2013 EM_{20}	—	January 11, 2008	Mount Lemmon	Mount Lemmon Survey	APO · PHA	370 m	MPC · JPL
517104 Redinger	2013 EO_{53}	Redinger	March 8, 2013	Haleakala	Pan-STARRS 1	HOF	2.0 km	MPC · JPL
517105	2013 EH_{102}	—	March 11, 2013	Kitt Peak	Spacewatch	·	2.0 km	MPC · JPL
517106	2013 EC_{113}	—	September 24, 2011	Haleakala	Pan-STARRS 1	·	1.4 km	MPC · JPL
517107	2013 EF_{117}	—	September 23, 2011	Kitt Peak	Spacewatch	·	1.8 km	MPC · JPL
517108	2013 EU_{126}	—	March 5, 2013	Catalina	CSS	(18466)	2.0 km	MPC · JPL
517109	2013 EE_{142}	—	March 1, 2009	Kitt Peak	Spacewatch	·	1.6 km	MPC · JPL
517110	2013 FE_{20}	—	March 31, 2013	Mount Lemmon	Mount Lemmon Survey	·	1.5 km	MPC · JPL
517111	2013 FH_{29}	—	March 18, 2013	Mount Lemmon	Mount Lemmon Survey	·	2.0 km	MPC · JPL
517112	2013 GO	—	February 13, 2008	Mount Lemmon	Mount Lemmon Survey	·	1.4 km	MPC · JPL
517113	2013 GL_{17}	—	March 6, 2013	Haleakala	Pan-STARRS 1	·	440 m	MPC · JPL
517114	2013 GK_{42}	—	April 8, 2013	Mount Lemmon	Mount Lemmon Survey	BRA	1.4 km	MPC · JPL
517115	2013 GG_{45}	—	October 11, 2010	Mount Lemmon	Mount Lemmon Survey	·	2.5 km	MPC · JPL
517116	2013 GJ_{52}	—	March 10, 2007	Kitt Peak	Spacewatch	·	2.6 km	MPC · JPL
517117	2013 GV_{90}	—	October 7, 2004	Kitt Peak	Spacewatch	·	1.9 km	MPC · JPL
517118	2013 GD_{97}	—	March 28, 2008	Kitt Peak	Spacewatch	·	1.5 km	MPC · JPL
517119	2013 GF_{115}	—	February 14, 2013	Haleakala	Pan-STARRS 1	EUN	1.0 km	MPC · JPL
517120	2013 GA_{126}	—	April 11, 2013	Kitt Peak	Spacewatch	·	1.8 km	MPC · JPL
517121	2013 GN_{139}	—	November 3, 2007	Kitt Peak	Spacewatch	·	1.3 km	MPC · JPL
517122	2013 GP_{139}	—	April 10, 2013	Kitt Peak	Spacewatch	·	1.9 km	MPC · JPL
517123	2013 GW_{139}	—	September 16, 2009	Mount Lemmon	Mount Lemmon Survey	EOS	1.6 km	MPC · JPL
517124	2013 HN	—	April 10, 2013	Catalina	CSS	H	430 m	MPC · JPL
517125	2013 HG_{4}	—	April 4, 2008	Kitt Peak	Spacewatch	·	1.5 km	MPC · JPL
517126	2013 HN_{10}	—	October 26, 2011	Haleakala	Pan-STARRS 1	·	1.8 km	MPC · JPL
517127	2013 HQ_{42}	—	January 19, 2012	Mount Lemmon	Mount Lemmon Survey	·	1.5 km	MPC · JPL
517128	2013 HQ_{65}	—	January 18, 2012	Mount Lemmon	Mount Lemmon Survey	·	1.4 km	MPC · JPL
517129	2013 HE_{88}	—	April 6, 2013	Mount Lemmon	Mount Lemmon Survey	·	1.2 km	MPC · JPL
517130	2013 HJ_{98}	—	April 14, 2008	Kitt Peak	Spacewatch	·	1.5 km	MPC · JPL
517131	2013 HZ_{106}	—	October 1, 2005	Mount Lemmon	Mount Lemmon Survey	·	1.6 km	MPC · JPL
517132	2013 HG_{117}	—	September 26, 2005	Kitt Peak	Spacewatch	·	1.6 km	MPC · JPL
517133	2013 HB_{118}	—	May 3, 2008	Mount Lemmon	Mount Lemmon Survey	EOS	1.4 km	MPC · JPL
517134	2013 JP_{7}	—	April 15, 2013	Haleakala	Pan-STARRS 1	H	520 m	MPC · JPL
517135	2013 JJ_{8}	—	November 3, 2010	Mount Lemmon	Mount Lemmon Survey	·	2.4 km	MPC · JPL
517136	2013 JM_{16}	—	April 29, 2008	Kitt Peak	Spacewatch	EOS	1.3 km	MPC · JPL
517137	2013 JR_{27}	—	January 26, 2010	WISE	WISE	·	4.3 km	MPC · JPL
517138	2013 JY_{28}	—	April 19, 2013	Mount Lemmon	Mount Lemmon Survey	H	440 m	MPC · JPL
517139	2013 JR_{37}	—	December 15, 2009	Mount Lemmon	Mount Lemmon Survey	H	490 m	MPC · JPL
517140	2013 JY_{54}	—	April 21, 2013	Mount Lemmon	Mount Lemmon Survey	·	1.7 km	MPC · JPL
517141	2013 JK_{60}	—	May 2, 2013	Haleakala	Pan-STARRS 1	·	3.0 km	MPC · JPL
517142	2013 JL_{61}	—	November 23, 2006	Mount Lemmon	Mount Lemmon Survey	H	420 m	MPC · JPL
517143	2013 JQ_{62}	—	April 7, 2013	Kitt Peak	Spacewatch	·	2.6 km	MPC · JPL
517144	2013 JQ_{63}	—	October 21, 2009	Kitt Peak	Spacewatch	·	2.8 km	MPC · JPL
517145	2013 KR	—	April 15, 2013	Haleakala	Pan-STARRS 1	·	2.9 km	MPC · JPL
517146	2013 KZ_{2}	—	June 17, 2005	Kitt Peak	Spacewatch	H	490 m	MPC · JPL
517147	2013 KA_{6}	—	November 15, 2006	Catalina	CSS	H	610 m	MPC · JPL
517148	2013 KF_{8}	—	March 10, 2007	Mount Lemmon	Mount Lemmon Survey	·	2.0 km	MPC · JPL
517149	2013 KW_{8}	—	March 12, 2007	Kitt Peak	Spacewatch	·	2.4 km	MPC · JPL
517150	2013 KD_{9}	—	October 14, 2009	Mount Lemmon	Mount Lemmon Survey	·	2.6 km	MPC · JPL
517151	2013 KG_{11}	—	November 16, 2009	Mount Lemmon	Mount Lemmon Survey	TIR	2.5 km	MPC · JPL
517152	2013 KE_{16}	—	April 16, 2013	Haleakala	Pan-STARRS 1	·	3.1 km	MPC · JPL
517153	2013 KP_{16}	—	May 11, 2013	Mount Lemmon	Mount Lemmon Survey	·	1.9 km	MPC · JPL
517154	2013 LY	—	February 15, 2013	Haleakala	Pan-STARRS 1	H	460 m	MPC · JPL
517155	2013 LS_{2}	—	May 16, 2013	Haleakala	Pan-STARRS 1	THM	1.7 km	MPC · JPL
517156	2013 LK_{6}	—	April 21, 2013	Mount Lemmon	Mount Lemmon Survey	·	2.1 km	MPC · JPL
517157	2013 LA_{17}	—	April 15, 2013	Haleakala	Pan-STARRS 1	·	1.9 km	MPC · JPL
517158	2013 LA_{26}	—	October 17, 2003	Kitt Peak	Spacewatch	H	410 m	MPC · JPL
517159	2013 LP_{29}	—	June 8, 2013	Kitt Peak	Spacewatch	H	470 m	MPC · JPL
517160	2013 MX	—	June 13, 2008	Kitt Peak	Spacewatch	H	490 m	MPC · JPL
517161	2013 MW_{2}	—	February 14, 2013	Haleakala	Pan-STARRS 1	THB	3.4 km	MPC · JPL
517162	2013 MD_{9}	—	June 30, 2013	Haleakala	Pan-STARRS 1	H	460 m	MPC · JPL
517163	2013 NT_{26}	—	August 26, 2004	Catalina	CSS	·	2.0 km	MPC · JPL
517164	2013 NU_{26}	—	July 15, 2013	Haleakala	Pan-STARRS 1	·	2.0 km	MPC · JPL
517165	2013 NV_{26}	—	August 29, 2006	Kitt Peak	Spacewatch	·	820 m	MPC · JPL
517166	2013 NY_{26}	—	October 20, 2007	Mount Lemmon	Mount Lemmon Survey	·	650 m	MPC · JPL
517167	2013 NA_{27}	—	September 28, 2008	Mount Lemmon	Mount Lemmon Survey	·	2.0 km	MPC · JPL
517168	2013 OF_{12}	—	July 16, 2013	Haleakala	Pan-STARRS 1	·	1.9 km	MPC · JPL
517169	2013 OG_{12}	—	November 30, 2008	Mount Lemmon	Mount Lemmon Survey	·	2.8 km	MPC · JPL
517170	2013 PW_{7}	—	February 27, 2012	Haleakala	Pan-STARRS 1	·	2.0 km	MPC · JPL
517171	2013 PY_{74}	—	January 19, 2012	Haleakala	Pan-STARRS 1	H	480 m	MPC · JPL
517172	2013 PG_{77}	—	November 21, 2009	Mount Lemmon	Mount Lemmon Survey	·	2.3 km	MPC · JPL
517173	2013 PL_{77}	—	October 20, 2008	Mount Lemmon	Mount Lemmon Survey	·	2.1 km	MPC · JPL
517174	2013 PQ_{77}	—	August 3, 1999	Kitt Peak	Spacewatch	·	1.4 km	MPC · JPL
517175	2013 PR_{77}	—	February 12, 2011	Mount Lemmon	Mount Lemmon Survey	·	2.0 km	MPC · JPL
517176	2013 PW_{77}	—	September 28, 2008	Mount Lemmon	Mount Lemmon Survey	VER	2.4 km	MPC · JPL
517177	2013 PA_{78}	—	October 10, 2008	Mount Lemmon	Mount Lemmon Survey	HYG	2.3 km	MPC · JPL
517178	2013 QX_{95}	—	August 27, 2013	Haleakala	Pan-STARRS 1	·	3.0 km	MPC · JPL
517179	2013 RY_{3}	—	March 16, 2004	Socorro	LINEAR	·	1.1 km	MPC · JPL
517180	2013 RC_{102}	—	August 7, 2008	Kitt Peak	Spacewatch	KOR	1.1 km	MPC · JPL
517181	2013 RD_{102}	—	August 7, 2008	Kitt Peak	Spacewatch	KOR	1.1 km	MPC · JPL
517182	2013 RG_{102}	—	November 1, 2008	Mount Lemmon	Mount Lemmon Survey	·	2.3 km	MPC · JPL
517183	2013 RK_{102}	—	September 23, 2008	Mount Lemmon	Mount Lemmon Survey	·	2.8 km	MPC · JPL
517184	2013 RL_{102}	—	February 7, 2011	Mount Lemmon	Mount Lemmon Survey	·	1.5 km	MPC · JPL
517185	2013 RM_{102}	—	September 13, 2013	Mount Lemmon	Mount Lemmon Survey	EOS	2.0 km	MPC · JPL
517186	2013 RN_{102}	—	September 13, 2013	Kitt Peak	Spacewatch	·	3.1 km	MPC · JPL
517187	2013 RO_{102}	—	January 8, 2010	Kitt Peak	Spacewatch	AGN	1.1 km	MPC · JPL
517188	2013 RP_{102}	—	September 14, 2013	Mount Lemmon	Mount Lemmon Survey	·	1.7 km	MPC · JPL
517189	2013 TG_{163}	—	August 5, 2008	Siding Spring	SSS	·	2.2 km	MPC · JPL
517190	2013 TL_{163}	—	October 3, 2013	Haleakala	Pan-STARRS 1	·	2.3 km	MPC · JPL
517191	2013 TQ_{163}	—	October 1, 2013	Kitt Peak	Spacewatch	·	1.5 km	MPC · JPL
517192	2013 TU_{163}	—	October 9, 2008	Catalina	CSS	EUN	1.2 km	MPC · JPL
517193	2013 TW_{163}	—	April 3, 2011	Haleakala	Pan-STARRS 1	·	1.5 km	MPC · JPL
517194	2013 TX_{163}	—	April 3, 2011	Haleakala	Pan-STARRS 1	·	1.8 km	MPC · JPL
517195	2013 UQ_{18}	—	October 24, 2013	Mount Lemmon	Mount Lemmon Survey	·	1.8 km	MPC · JPL
517196	2013 US_{18}	—	December 1, 2008	Mount Lemmon	Mount Lemmon Survey	·	3.0 km	MPC · JPL
517197	2013 UT_{18}	—	October 15, 2013	Mount Lemmon	Mount Lemmon Survey	·	3.9 km	MPC · JPL
517198	2013 UU_{18}	—	December 21, 2008	Catalina	CSS	·	2.9 km	MPC · JPL
517199	2013 VA_{26}	—	September 24, 2008	Mount Lemmon	Mount Lemmon Survey	·	1.6 km	MPC · JPL
517200	2013 VB_{26}	—	November 4, 2013	Kitt Peak	Spacewatch	·	1.6 km	MPC · JPL

== 517201–517300 ==
back to top

Designation			Discovery			Properties		Ref
Permanent	Provisional	Named after	Date	Site	Discoverer(s)	Category	Diam.	Ref
517201	2013 VC_{26}	—	November 6, 2013	Mount Lemmon	Mount Lemmon Survey	·	2.0 km	MPC · JPL
517202	2013 VE_{26}	—	August 17, 2012	Haleakala	Pan-STARRS 1	·	1.9 km	MPC · JPL
517203	2013 VF_{26}	—	November 9, 2013	Haleakala	Pan-STARRS 1	KOR	1.1 km	MPC · JPL
517204	2013 VH_{26}	—	September 7, 2008	Mount Lemmon	Mount Lemmon Survey	·	1.3 km	MPC · JPL
517205	2013 XR_{26}	—	October 17, 2006	Mount Lemmon	Mount Lemmon Survey	·	850 m	MPC · JPL
517206	2013 XT_{26}	—	December 7, 2013	Kitt Peak	Spacewatch	·	1.2 km	MPC · JPL
517207	2013 YQ_{5}	—	January 10, 2007	Mount Lemmon	Mount Lemmon Survey	·	820 m	MPC · JPL
517208	2013 YY_{19}	—	December 11, 2013	Catalina	CSS	PHO	840 m	MPC · JPL
517209	2013 YC_{43}	—	December 13, 2013	Mount Lemmon	Mount Lemmon Survey	NYS	920 m	MPC · JPL
517210	2013 YS_{115}	—	December 30, 2013	Kitt Peak	Spacewatch	·	840 m	MPC · JPL
517211	2013 YW_{122}	—	December 13, 2006	Kitt Peak	Spacewatch	·	740 m	MPC · JPL
517212	2013 YE_{149}	—	November 27, 2009	Mount Lemmon	Mount Lemmon Survey	·	1.3 km	MPC · JPL
517213	2013 YV_{152}	—	December 24, 2013	Mount Lemmon	Mount Lemmon Survey	·	1.2 km	MPC · JPL
517214	2013 YW_{152}	—	December 25, 2013	Mount Lemmon	Mount Lemmon Survey	NEM	2.0 km	MPC · JPL
517215	2013 YX_{152}	—	December 25, 2013	Mount Lemmon	Mount Lemmon Survey	·	1.5 km	MPC · JPL
517216	2014 AV_{6}	—	January 28, 2007	Kitt Peak	Spacewatch	·	860 m	MPC · JPL
517217	2014 AK_{57}	—	January 1, 2014	Haleakala	Pan-STARRS 1	·	1.1 km	MPC · JPL
517218	2014 AL_{57}	—	February 17, 2010	Mount Lemmon	Mount Lemmon Survey	·	1.0 km	MPC · JPL
517219	2014 AN_{57}	—	January 5, 2014	Haleakala	Pan-STARRS 1	·	1.7 km	MPC · JPL
517220	2014 BR_{6}	—	December 25, 2013	Mount Lemmon	Mount Lemmon Survey	·	950 m	MPC · JPL
517221	2014 BZ_{9}	—	December 31, 2002	Socorro	LINEAR	PHO	820 m	MPC · JPL
517222	2014 BX_{10}	—	March 13, 2011	Mount Lemmon	Mount Lemmon Survey	·	590 m	MPC · JPL
517223	2014 BX_{12}	—	April 2, 2011	Kitt Peak	Spacewatch	·	1.1 km	MPC · JPL
517224	2014 BD_{17}	—	February 26, 2007	Mount Lemmon	Mount Lemmon Survey	NYS	890 m	MPC · JPL
517225	2014 BA_{21}	—	December 20, 2006	Mount Lemmon	Mount Lemmon Survey	·	880 m	MPC · JPL
517226	2014 BT_{33}	—	November 24, 2009	Kitt Peak	Spacewatch	NYS	900 m	MPC · JPL
517227	2014 BR_{35}	—	January 21, 2014	Kitt Peak	Spacewatch	(5)	1.0 km	MPC · JPL
517228	2014 BD_{46}	—	January 7, 2014	Mount Lemmon	Mount Lemmon Survey	·	970 m	MPC · JPL
517229	2014 BP_{54}	—	March 25, 2007	Mount Lemmon	Mount Lemmon Survey	MAS	580 m	MPC · JPL
517230	2014 BX_{58}	—	December 30, 2013	Mount Lemmon	Mount Lemmon Survey	·	2.6 km	MPC · JPL
517231	2014 BK_{61}	—	October 23, 2009	Mount Lemmon	Mount Lemmon Survey	·	840 m	MPC · JPL
517232	2014 BG_{66}	—	October 28, 2008	Mount Lemmon	Mount Lemmon Survey	·	1.3 km	MPC · JPL
517233	2014 BJ_{66}	—	November 2, 2008	Catalina	CSS	·	2.0 km	MPC · JPL
517234	2014 CE_{2}	—	November 25, 2005	Mount Lemmon	Mount Lemmon Survey	·	930 m	MPC · JPL
517235	2014 CR_{14}	—	December 14, 2013	Mount Lemmon	Mount Lemmon Survey	·	1.2 km	MPC · JPL
517236	2014 CR_{24}	—	January 6, 2010	Kitt Peak	Spacewatch	NYS	1.2 km	MPC · JPL
517237	2014 CS_{24}	—	December 31, 2008	Mount Lemmon	Mount Lemmon Survey	·	2.2 km	MPC · JPL
517238	2014 CT_{24}	—	October 10, 2008	Mount Lemmon	Mount Lemmon Survey	V	760 m	MPC · JPL
517239	2014 DY_{19}	—	March 24, 2003	Kitt Peak	Spacewatch	MAS	610 m	MPC · JPL
517240	2014 DG_{24}	—	December 1, 2005	Kitt Peak	L. H. Wasserman, R. L. Millis	·	830 m	MPC · JPL
517241	2014 DB_{26}	—	February 20, 2014	Kitt Peak	Spacewatch	·	970 m	MPC · JPL
517242	2014 DE_{26}	—	December 1, 2005	Kitt Peak	Spacewatch	NYS	880 m	MPC · JPL
517243	2014 DN_{26}	—	April 14, 2007	Kitt Peak	Spacewatch	·	1.2 km	MPC · JPL
517244	2014 DC_{27}	—	December 18, 2009	Kitt Peak	Spacewatch	·	830 m	MPC · JPL
517245	2014 DA_{29}	—	March 13, 2007	Mount Lemmon	Mount Lemmon Survey	NYS	810 m	MPC · JPL
517246	2014 DG_{31}	—	April 29, 2003	Kitt Peak	Spacewatch	NYS	1.0 km	MPC · JPL
517247	2014 DV_{32}	—	April 4, 2010	WISE	WISE	·	1.7 km	MPC · JPL
517248	2014 DK_{35}	—	April 24, 2003	Kitt Peak	Spacewatch	NYS	930 m	MPC · JPL
517249	2014 DH_{40}	—	October 30, 2005	Mount Lemmon	Mount Lemmon Survey	MAS	530 m	MPC · JPL
517250	2014 DU_{50}	—	February 17, 2010	Mount Lemmon	Mount Lemmon Survey	·	920 m	MPC · JPL
517251	2014 DV_{60}	—	July 22, 2011	Haleakala	Pan-STARRS 1	·	1.2 km	MPC · JPL
517252	2014 DD_{67}	—	October 7, 2012	Haleakala	Pan-STARRS 1	·	1.2 km	MPC · JPL
517253	2014 DG_{75}	—	October 25, 2008	Mount Lemmon	Mount Lemmon Survey	V	710 m	MPC · JPL
517254	2014 DL_{76}	—	February 26, 2014	Haleakala	Pan-STARRS 1	MAS	680 m	MPC · JPL
517255	2014 DF_{115}	—	January 29, 2014	Kitt Peak	Spacewatch	MAS	530 m	MPC · JPL
517256	2014 DO_{121}	—	February 23, 2007	Mount Lemmon	Mount Lemmon Survey	PHO	2.7 km	MPC · JPL
517257	2014 DP_{124}	—	January 17, 2010	Kitt Peak	Spacewatch	NYS	1.0 km	MPC · JPL
517258	2014 DX_{135}	—	February 9, 2014	Haleakala	Pan-STARRS 1	NYS	1.0 km	MPC · JPL
517259	2014 DV_{137}	—	February 27, 2006	Kitt Peak	Spacewatch	·	800 m	MPC · JPL
517260	2014 DQ_{139}	—	January 6, 2010	Kitt Peak	Spacewatch	NYS	1.4 km	MPC · JPL
517261	2014 DH_{146}	—	February 7, 2006	Kitt Peak	Spacewatch	·	1.0 km	MPC · JPL
517262	2014 DK_{146}	—	February 26, 2014	Haleakala	Pan-STARRS 1	·	1.1 km	MPC · JPL
517263	2014 EB_{9}	—	April 29, 2010	WISE	WISE	·	1.9 km	MPC · JPL
517264	2014 EY_{131}	—	February 28, 2014	Haleakala	Pan-STARRS 1	PHO	770 m	MPC · JPL
517265	2014 EX_{231}	—	March 14, 2007	Kitt Peak	Spacewatch	V	600 m	MPC · JPL
517266	2014 FP_{1}	—	February 26, 2014	Haleakala	Pan-STARRS 1	MAS	640 m	MPC · JPL
517267	2014 FG_{9}	—	September 11, 2005	Kitt Peak	Spacewatch	·	1.1 km	MPC · JPL
517268	2014 FX_{10}	—	January 2, 2006	Mount Lemmon	Mount Lemmon Survey	·	1.0 km	MPC · JPL
517269	2014 FD_{18}	—	February 28, 2014	Haleakala	Pan-STARRS 1	·	1.2 km	MPC · JPL
517270	2014 FY_{18}	—	October 11, 2012	Haleakala	Pan-STARRS 1	·	1.2 km	MPC · JPL
517271	2014 FV_{37}	—	March 20, 2014	Haleakala	Pan-STARRS 1	H	680 m	MPC · JPL
517272	2014 FH_{67}	—	March 6, 2008	Catalina	CSS	·	3.9 km	MPC · JPL
517273	2014 FE_{73}	—	May 23, 2006	Mount Lemmon	Mount Lemmon Survey	·	1.1 km	MPC · JPL
517274	2014 FE_{74}	—	September 4, 2011	Haleakala	Pan-STARRS 1	TEL	1.5 km	MPC · JPL
517275	2014 FF_{74}	—	October 18, 2012	Haleakala	Pan-STARRS 1	·	1.2 km	MPC · JPL
517276	2014 FG_{74}	—	December 9, 2012	Haleakala	Pan-STARRS 1	·	2.2 km	MPC · JPL
517277	2014 FH_{74}	—	November 1, 2008	Mount Lemmon	Mount Lemmon Survey	·	1.3 km	MPC · JPL
517278	2014 FL_{74}	—	May 11, 2010	Mount Lemmon	Mount Lemmon Survey	·	1.3 km	MPC · JPL
517279	2014 GO_{22}	—	April 4, 2014	Kitt Peak	Spacewatch	·	890 m	MPC · JPL
517280	2014 GF_{26}	—	October 15, 2007	Kitt Peak	Spacewatch	(5)	1.2 km	MPC · JPL
517281	2014 GJ_{32}	—	March 25, 2014	Kitt Peak	Spacewatch	·	1.0 km	MPC · JPL
517282	2014 GQ_{37}	—	March 9, 2014	Haleakala	Pan-STARRS 1	·	1.3 km	MPC · JPL
517283	2014 GV_{41}	—	March 16, 2005	Mount Lemmon	Mount Lemmon Survey	·	1.4 km	MPC · JPL
517284	2014 GU_{56}	—	March 25, 2014	Mount Lemmon	Mount Lemmon Survey	MAR	880 m	MPC · JPL
517285	2014 GT_{58}	—	February 4, 2009	Mount Lemmon	Mount Lemmon Survey	(12739)	1.5 km	MPC · JPL
517286	2014 GV_{58}	—	November 15, 2003	Kitt Peak	Spacewatch	·	1.2 km	MPC · JPL
517287	2014 GY_{58}	—	April 5, 2014	Haleakala	Pan-STARRS 1	·	1.1 km	MPC · JPL
517288	2014 HM	—	March 21, 2014	Kitt Peak	Spacewatch	·	1.2 km	MPC · JPL
517289	2014 HF_{2}	—	September 24, 2011	Haleakala	Pan-STARRS 1	·	1.3 km	MPC · JPL
517290	2014 HB_{7}	—	December 6, 2012	Mount Lemmon	Mount Lemmon Survey	·	1.1 km	MPC · JPL
517291	2014 HK_{7}	—	September 26, 2011	Haleakala	Pan-STARRS 1	·	1.1 km	MPC · JPL
517292	2014 HC_{10}	—	March 12, 2010	Mount Lemmon	Mount Lemmon Survey	·	1.0 km	MPC · JPL
517293	2014 HD_{10}	—	November 12, 2012	Mount Lemmon	Mount Lemmon Survey	BRG	1.2 km	MPC · JPL
517294	2014 HA_{14}	—	April 24, 2006	Kitt Peak	Spacewatch	·	720 m	MPC · JPL
517295	2014 HD_{14}	—	March 27, 2014	Haleakala	Pan-STARRS 1	·	700 m	MPC · JPL
517296	2014 HB_{15}	—	October 27, 2008	Mount Lemmon	Mount Lemmon Survey	·	800 m	MPC · JPL
517297	2014 HY_{41}	—	December 4, 2008	Kitt Peak	Spacewatch	·	920 m	MPC · JPL
517298	2014 HE_{67}	—	October 10, 2007	Mount Lemmon	Mount Lemmon Survey	HNS	900 m	MPC · JPL
517299	2014 HW_{74}	—	October 28, 2008	Mount Lemmon	Mount Lemmon Survey	·	850 m	MPC · JPL
517300	2014 HG_{76}	—	October 21, 2012	Haleakala	Pan-STARRS 1	(5)	820 m	MPC · JPL

== 517301–517400 ==
back to top

Designation			Discovery			Properties		Ref
Permanent	Provisional	Named after	Date	Site	Discoverer(s)	Category	Diam.	Ref
517301	2014 HY_{96}	—	September 26, 2011	Haleakala	Pan-STARRS 1	·	850 m	MPC · JPL
517302	2014 HM_{105}	—	April 5, 2014	Haleakala	Pan-STARRS 1	·	900 m	MPC · JPL
517303	2014 HS_{125}	—	April 4, 2014	Haleakala	Pan-STARRS 1	DOR	2.0 km	MPC · JPL
517304	2014 HA_{132}	—	January 17, 2013	Haleakala	Pan-STARRS 1	·	1.2 km	MPC · JPL
517305	2014 HR_{142}	—	April 5, 2014	Haleakala	Pan-STARRS 1	·	3.1 km	MPC · JPL
517306	2014 HO_{153}	—	December 4, 2008	Mount Lemmon	Mount Lemmon Survey	·	990 m	MPC · JPL
517307	2014 HZ_{168}	—	February 15, 2010	Mount Lemmon	Mount Lemmon Survey	·	1.0 km	MPC · JPL
517308	2014 HY_{178}	—	February 28, 2014	Haleakala	Pan-STARRS 1	·	1.6 km	MPC · JPL
517309	2014 HB_{188}	—	April 20, 2014	Mount Lemmon	Mount Lemmon Survey	MIS	2.1 km	MPC · JPL
517310	2014 HY_{201}	—	February 9, 2005	Kitt Peak	Spacewatch	·	1.2 km	MPC · JPL
517311	2014 HK_{202}	—	January 3, 2009	Mount Lemmon	Mount Lemmon Survey	·	1.1 km	MPC · JPL
517312	2014 HL_{202}	—	March 17, 2005	Mount Lemmon	Mount Lemmon Survey	·	1.3 km	MPC · JPL
517313	2014 HY_{202}	—	April 30, 2014	Haleakala	Pan-STARRS 1	·	1.3 km	MPC · JPL
517314	2014 HF_{203}	—	October 8, 2007	Mount Lemmon	Mount Lemmon Survey	·	1.3 km	MPC · JPL
517315	2014 HA_{204}	—	October 12, 2007	Mount Lemmon	Mount Lemmon Survey	·	1.5 km	MPC · JPL
517316	2014 JL_{7}	—	May 3, 2014	Mount Lemmon	Mount Lemmon Survey	·	1.1 km	MPC · JPL
517317	2014 JO_{8}	—	February 28, 2014	Haleakala	Pan-STARRS 1	·	1.5 km	MPC · JPL
517318	2014 JA_{10}	—	October 21, 2011	Mount Lemmon	Mount Lemmon Survey	(5)	1.2 km	MPC · JPL
517319	2014 JJ_{12}	—	March 28, 2014	Haleakala	Pan-STARRS 1	·	1.6 km	MPC · JPL
517320	2014 JL_{13}	—	May 3, 2014	Mount Lemmon	Mount Lemmon Survey	·	1.3 km	MPC · JPL
517321	2014 JT_{13}	—	November 12, 2007	Mount Lemmon	Mount Lemmon Survey	·	1.0 km	MPC · JPL
517322	2014 JV_{15}	—	April 14, 2010	Mount Lemmon	Mount Lemmon Survey	PHO	1.1 km	MPC · JPL
517323	2014 JR_{16}	—	May 2, 2014	Mount Lemmon	Mount Lemmon Survey	·	1.2 km	MPC · JPL
517324	2014 JK_{17}	—	April 10, 2010	WISE	WISE	ADE	2.3 km	MPC · JPL
517325	2014 JW_{18}	—	September 2, 2011	Haleakala	Pan-STARRS 1	·	1.0 km	MPC · JPL
517326	2014 JJ_{20}	—	September 1, 2010	Mount Lemmon	Mount Lemmon Survey	·	3.2 km	MPC · JPL
517327	2014 JK_{21}	—	September 20, 1998	Kitt Peak	Spacewatch	(5)	1.2 km	MPC · JPL
517328	2014 JZ_{34}	—	February 28, 2014	Haleakala	Pan-STARRS 1	(5)	1.2 km	MPC · JPL
517329	2014 JV_{36}	—	September 20, 2011	Mount Lemmon	Mount Lemmon Survey	(5)	1.1 km	MPC · JPL
517330	2014 JX_{42}	—	May 5, 2014	Haleakala	Pan-STARRS 1	·	970 m	MPC · JPL
517331	2014 JB_{43}	—	April 27, 2010	WISE	WISE	·	1.4 km	MPC · JPL
517332	2014 JD_{47}	—	November 9, 2007	Kitt Peak	Spacewatch	·	1.9 km	MPC · JPL
517333	2014 JW_{50}	—	April 12, 2010	Mount Lemmon	Mount Lemmon Survey	EUN	1.1 km	MPC · JPL
517334	2014 JS_{53}	—	February 4, 2009	Mount Lemmon	Mount Lemmon Survey	·	1.1 km	MPC · JPL
517335	2014 JW_{53}	—	February 20, 2009	Kitt Peak	Spacewatch	·	1.0 km	MPC · JPL
517336	2014 JM_{60}	—	May 4, 2014	Haleakala	Pan-STARRS 1	·	1.2 km	MPC · JPL
517337	2014 JA_{63}	—	October 25, 2011	Haleakala	Pan-STARRS 1	EUN	1.1 km	MPC · JPL
517338	2014 JC_{63}	—	February 19, 2009	Kitt Peak	Spacewatch	·	1.8 km	MPC · JPL
517339	2014 JL_{63}	—	October 20, 2007	Mount Lemmon	Mount Lemmon Survey	BAR	1.0 km	MPC · JPL
517340	2014 JO_{65}	—	May 4, 2010	Kitt Peak	Spacewatch	·	1.0 km	MPC · JPL
517341	2014 JV_{65}	—	January 17, 2013	Haleakala	Pan-STARRS 1	·	1.1 km	MPC · JPL
517342	2014 JH_{66}	—	May 7, 2010	Mount Lemmon	Mount Lemmon Survey	·	870 m	MPC · JPL
517343	2014 JN_{66}	—	December 22, 2008	Kitt Peak	Spacewatch	·	1.0 km	MPC · JPL
517344	2014 JO_{66}	—	April 12, 2005	Mount Lemmon	Mount Lemmon Survey	·	1.3 km	MPC · JPL
517345	2014 JS_{66}	—	December 23, 2012	Haleakala	Pan-STARRS 1	·	1.1 km	MPC · JPL
517346	2014 JG_{67}	—	December 22, 2012	Haleakala	Pan-STARRS 1	MAR	820 m	MPC · JPL
517347	2014 JS_{71}	—	December 22, 2012	Haleakala	Pan-STARRS 1	·	1.8 km	MPC · JPL
517348	2014 JJ_{72}	—	April 30, 2014	Haleakala	Pan-STARRS 1	(5)	1.3 km	MPC · JPL
517349	2014 JQ_{74}	—	October 4, 2006	Mount Lemmon	Mount Lemmon Survey	·	1.4 km	MPC · JPL
517350	2014 JR_{74}	—	April 22, 2014	Kitt Peak	Spacewatch	·	1.3 km	MPC · JPL
517351	2014 JC_{84}	—	January 19, 2013	Kitt Peak	Spacewatch	·	1.5 km	MPC · JPL
517352	2014 JP_{84}	—	May 10, 2014	Haleakala	Pan-STARRS 1	·	1.2 km	MPC · JPL
517353	2014 JX_{84}	—	May 8, 2014	Haleakala	Pan-STARRS 1	EUN	1.1 km	MPC · JPL
517354	2014 JJ_{85}	—	November 2, 2007	Mount Lemmon	Mount Lemmon Survey	·	1.3 km	MPC · JPL
517355	2014 JL_{85}	—	October 10, 2007	Mount Lemmon	Mount Lemmon Survey	·	1.5 km	MPC · JPL
517356	2014 JN_{85}	—	January 3, 2013	Haleakala	Pan-STARRS 1	MAR	970 m	MPC · JPL
517357	2014 JP_{86}	—	September 4, 2011	Haleakala	Pan-STARRS 1	·	2.1 km	MPC · JPL
517358	2014 JV_{86}	—	February 4, 2009	Catalina	CSS	·	1.3 km	MPC · JPL
517359	2014 JW_{86}	—	December 31, 2008	Kitt Peak	Spacewatch	·	1.2 km	MPC · JPL
517360	2014 JX_{86}	—	September 26, 2011	Haleakala	Pan-STARRS 1	·	1.2 km	MPC · JPL
517361	2014 JY_{86}	—	March 3, 2009	Mount Lemmon	Mount Lemmon Survey	·	1.6 km	MPC · JPL
517362	2014 KC_{4}	—	September 16, 2006	Catalina	CSS	·	1.2 km	MPC · JPL
517363	2014 KX_{4}	—	December 31, 2008	Kitt Peak	Spacewatch	·	1.0 km	MPC · JPL
517364	2014 KA_{16}	—	April 5, 2005	Mount Lemmon	Mount Lemmon Survey	·	1.1 km	MPC · JPL
517365	2014 KO_{19}	—	May 3, 2014	Mount Lemmon	Mount Lemmon Survey	·	970 m	MPC · JPL
517366	2014 KZ_{25}	—	October 7, 2007	Mount Lemmon	Mount Lemmon Survey	·	1.1 km	MPC · JPL
517367	2014 KC_{29}	—	March 11, 2010	WISE	WISE	KON	2.7 km	MPC · JPL
517368	2014 KE_{33}	—	April 30, 2014	Haleakala	Pan-STARRS 1	·	880 m	MPC · JPL
517369	2014 KL_{43}	—	May 7, 2014	Haleakala	Pan-STARRS 1	·	1.4 km	MPC · JPL
517370	2014 KP_{43}	—	January 16, 2004	Kitt Peak	Spacewatch	·	1.5 km	MPC · JPL
517371	2014 KS_{43}	—	May 4, 2014	Kitt Peak	Spacewatch	EUN	830 m	MPC · JPL
517372	2014 KV_{43}	—	November 25, 2011	Haleakala	Pan-STARRS 1	·	1.7 km	MPC · JPL
517373	2014 KR_{52}	—	December 30, 2007	Kitt Peak	Spacewatch	·	1.6 km	MPC · JPL
517374	2014 KD_{53}	—	May 7, 2014	Haleakala	Pan-STARRS 1	·	1.9 km	MPC · JPL
517375	2014 KS_{56}	—	May 7, 2014	Haleakala	Pan-STARRS 1	·	1.5 km	MPC · JPL
517376	2014 KV_{57}	—	December 8, 2012	Mount Lemmon	Mount Lemmon Survey	ADE	1.7 km	MPC · JPL
517377	2014 KY_{57}	—	August 6, 2010	La Sagra	OAM	·	890 m	MPC · JPL
517378	2014 KZ_{66}	—	January 16, 2013	Haleakala	Pan-STARRS 1	·	1.7 km	MPC · JPL
517379	2014 KQ_{74}	—	February 14, 2013	Haleakala	Pan-STARRS 1	WIT	940 m	MPC · JPL
517380	2014 KK_{78}	—	November 3, 2007	Kitt Peak	Spacewatch	·	1.3 km	MPC · JPL
517381	2014 KM_{79}	—	February 8, 2013	Haleakala	Pan-STARRS 1	·	1.6 km	MPC · JPL
517382	2014 KB_{86}	—	May 24, 2014	Mount Lemmon	Mount Lemmon Survey	·	1.5 km	MPC · JPL
517383	2014 KZ_{86}	—	May 17, 2010	La Sagra	OAM	·	1.6 km	MPC · JPL
517384	2014 KV_{87}	—	April 30, 2014	Catalina	CSS	ADE	1.5 km	MPC · JPL
517385	2014 KE_{93}	—	March 17, 2005	Kitt Peak	Spacewatch	·	1.1 km	MPC · JPL
517386	2014 KL_{95}	—	May 23, 2014	Haleakala	Pan-STARRS 1	·	1.9 km	MPC · JPL
517387	2014 KT_{100}	—	June 23, 2010	Mount Lemmon	Mount Lemmon Survey	JUN	860 m	MPC · JPL
517388	2014 KZ_{103}	—	August 19, 2006	Kitt Peak	Spacewatch	·	1.4 km	MPC · JPL
517389	2014 KQ_{104}	—	May 21, 2014	Haleakala	Pan-STARRS 1	·	1.9 km	MPC · JPL
517390	2014 KR_{104}	—	January 13, 2008	Kitt Peak	Spacewatch	·	1.9 km	MPC · JPL
517391	2014 KT_{104}	—	May 28, 2014	Haleakala	Pan-STARRS 1	·	1.3 km	MPC · JPL
517392	2014 KU_{104}	—	August 13, 2010	Kitt Peak	Spacewatch	MRX	790 m	MPC · JPL
517393	2014 KA_{105}	—	November 15, 2007	Mount Lemmon	Mount Lemmon Survey	·	1.5 km	MPC · JPL
517394	2014 KD_{105}	—	December 23, 2012	Haleakala	Pan-STARRS 1	·	1.6 km	MPC · JPL
517395	2014 KG_{105}	—	September 25, 2009	Mount Lemmon	Mount Lemmon Survey	T_{j} (2.98)	3.4 km	MPC · JPL
517396	2014 KR_{105}	—	June 13, 2010	WISE	WISE	·	3.0 km	MPC · JPL
517397	2014 KJ_{106}	—	February 20, 2001	Kitt Peak	Spacewatch	(5)	1.1 km	MPC · JPL
517398	2014 KL_{106}	—	February 2, 2005	Kitt Peak	Spacewatch	·	1.1 km	MPC · JPL
517399	2014 LQ	—	June 5, 1997	Kitt Peak	Spacewatch	·	1.5 km	MPC · JPL
517400	2014 LL_{4}	—	October 24, 2011	Mount Lemmon	Mount Lemmon Survey	·	1.0 km	MPC · JPL

== 517401–517500 ==
back to top

Designation			Discovery			Properties		Ref
Permanent	Provisional	Named after	Date	Site	Discoverer(s)	Category	Diam.	Ref
517401	2014 LP_{5}	—	February 8, 2013	Haleakala	Pan-STARRS 1	·	1.3 km	MPC · JPL
517402	2014 LN_{10}	—	February 16, 2010	WISE	WISE	·	2.9 km	MPC · JPL
517403	2014 LY_{13}	—	September 26, 2006	Kitt Peak	Spacewatch	AGN	920 m	MPC · JPL
517404	2014 LB_{14}	—	February 7, 1997	Kitt Peak	Spacewatch	·	1.2 km	MPC · JPL
517405	2014 LP_{15}	—	June 2, 2014	Mount Lemmon	Mount Lemmon Survey	GEF	1.2 km	MPC · JPL
517406	2014 LA_{18}	—	May 5, 2014	Haleakala	Pan-STARRS 1	·	1.2 km	MPC · JPL
517407	2014 LG_{21}	—	July 5, 2010	WISE	WISE	·	2.7 km	MPC · JPL
517408	2014 LE_{23}	—	May 27, 2014	Mount Lemmon	Mount Lemmon Survey	·	1.8 km	MPC · JPL
517409	2014 LT_{24}	—	May 27, 2014	Kitt Peak	Spacewatch	·	1.0 km	MPC · JPL
517410	2014 LT_{29}	—	April 4, 2008	Catalina	CSS	·	2.3 km	MPC · JPL
517411	2014 LV_{29}	—	March 28, 2008	Mount Lemmon	Mount Lemmon Survey	·	1.5 km	MPC · JPL
517412	2014 LA_{30}	—	April 4, 2008	Mount Lemmon	Mount Lemmon Survey	·	2.0 km	MPC · JPL
517413	2014 LD_{30}	—	September 21, 2009	Catalina	CSS	EOS	2.1 km	MPC · JPL
517414	2014 MB	—	September 18, 2006	Siding Spring	SSS	BAR	1.3 km	MPC · JPL
517415	2014 MR_{1}	—	May 20, 2014	Haleakala	Pan-STARRS 1	JUN	1.0 km	MPC · JPL
517416	2014 MD_{3}	—	June 5, 2014	Catalina	CSS	·	1.5 km	MPC · JPL
517417	2014 MP_{3}	—	May 7, 2014	Haleakala	Pan-STARRS 1	·	1.6 km	MPC · JPL
517418	2014 MB_{10}	—	October 20, 2006	Kitt Peak	Spacewatch	·	2.2 km	MPC · JPL
517419	2014 MP_{10}	—	April 20, 2009	Mount Lemmon	Mount Lemmon Survey	·	2.2 km	MPC · JPL
517420	2014 MF_{21}	—	April 11, 2010	WISE	WISE	·	1.6 km	MPC · JPL
517421	2014 MA_{22}	—	August 10, 2010	Kitt Peak	Spacewatch	AEO	940 m	MPC · JPL
517422	2014 MR_{28}	—	May 14, 2005	Kitt Peak	Spacewatch	·	1.4 km	MPC · JPL
517423	2014 MN_{47}	—	September 17, 2006	Kitt Peak	Spacewatch	·	1.2 km	MPC · JPL
517424	2014 ME_{53}	—	June 2, 2005	Catalina	CSS	·	1.8 km	MPC · JPL
517425	2014 MZ_{56}	—	April 26, 2007	Mount Lemmon	Mount Lemmon Survey	LUT	3.5 km	MPC · JPL
517426	2014 MM_{67}	—	January 19, 2012	Mount Lemmon	Mount Lemmon Survey	BAR	1.2 km	MPC · JPL
517427	2014 MR_{72}	—	August 23, 2008	Siding Spring	SSS	CYB	4.5 km	MPC · JPL
517428	2014 MB_{73}	—	April 10, 2013	Haleakala	Pan-STARRS 1	·	2.1 km	MPC · JPL
517429	2014 NQ	—	August 29, 2006	Kitt Peak	Spacewatch	·	930 m	MPC · JPL
517430	2014 NZ_{21}	—	June 24, 2014	Kitt Peak	Spacewatch	·	3.2 km	MPC · JPL
517431	2014 NT_{24}	—	December 13, 2006	Kitt Peak	Spacewatch	·	2.3 km	MPC · JPL
517432	2014 NT_{40}	—	May 1, 2009	Kitt Peak	Spacewatch	·	1.4 km	MPC · JPL
517433	2014 NY_{54}	—	July 6, 2014	Haleakala	Pan-STARRS 1	·	2.0 km	MPC · JPL
517434	2014 NF_{68}	—	March 19, 2013	Haleakala	Pan-STARRS 1	·	1.5 km	MPC · JPL
517435	2014 OJ_{70}	—	December 27, 2006	Mount Lemmon	Mount Lemmon Survey	·	1.7 km	MPC · JPL
517436	2014 OS_{73}	—	September 25, 2006	Catalina	CSS	(1547)	1.5 km	MPC · JPL
517437	2014 OQ_{100}	—	January 20, 2012	Kitt Peak	Spacewatch	·	2.7 km	MPC · JPL
517438	2014 OU_{100}	—	July 26, 2014	Haleakala	Pan-STARRS 1	·	1.9 km	MPC · JPL
517439	2014 OT_{106}	—	June 27, 2014	Haleakala	Pan-STARRS 1	·	2.8 km	MPC · JPL
517440	2014 OP_{111}	—	June 27, 2014	Haleakala	Pan-STARRS 1	·	1.7 km	MPC · JPL
517441	2014 OM_{127}	—	August 18, 2009	Kitt Peak	Spacewatch	HYG	2.7 km	MPC · JPL
517442	2014 OQ_{130}	—	January 18, 2013	Kitt Peak	Spacewatch	·	1.5 km	MPC · JPL
517443	2014 OO_{131}	—	February 28, 2010	WISE	WISE	·	990 m	MPC · JPL
517444	2014 OT_{141}	—	February 12, 2012	Mount Lemmon	Mount Lemmon Survey	·	1.8 km	MPC · JPL
517445	2014 OH_{150}	—	July 27, 2014	Haleakala	Pan-STARRS 1	·	3.0 km	MPC · JPL
517446	2014 OO_{151}	—	April 29, 2009	Mount Lemmon	Mount Lemmon Survey	(13314)	2.5 km	MPC · JPL
517447	2014 OK_{168}	—	March 26, 2007	Mount Lemmon	Mount Lemmon Survey	·	2.6 km	MPC · JPL
517448	2014 OE_{205}	—	March 15, 2007	Kitt Peak	Spacewatch	EOS	1.6 km	MPC · JPL
517449	2014 OH_{205}	—	October 2, 2010	Mount Lemmon	Mount Lemmon Survey	·	1.8 km	MPC · JPL
517450	2014 OB_{219}	—	April 10, 2013	Mount Lemmon	Mount Lemmon Survey	(31811)	2.5 km	MPC · JPL
517451	2014 OK_{228}	—	September 17, 2003	Kitt Peak	Spacewatch	·	2.4 km	MPC · JPL
517452	2014 OE_{260}	—	April 15, 2013	Haleakala	Pan-STARRS 1	·	2.9 km	MPC · JPL
517453	2014 OA_{270}	—	April 15, 2013	Haleakala	Pan-STARRS 1	·	2.8 km	MPC · JPL
517454	2014 OU_{336}	—	October 4, 2004	Kitt Peak	Spacewatch	EOS	1.6 km	MPC · JPL
517455	2014 OJ_{342}	—	November 27, 2010	Mount Lemmon	Mount Lemmon Survey	·	1.4 km	MPC · JPL
517456	2014 OB_{346}	—	January 1, 2012	Mount Lemmon	Mount Lemmon Survey	EOS	1.4 km	MPC · JPL
517457	2014 OY_{346}	—	May 7, 2014	Haleakala	Pan-STARRS 1	·	2.4 km	MPC · JPL
517458	2014 OO_{354}	—	October 26, 2005	Kitt Peak	Spacewatch	·	1.9 km	MPC · JPL
517459	2014 OV_{358}	—	January 19, 2012	Haleakala	Pan-STARRS 1	·	2.3 km	MPC · JPL
517460	2014 OC_{369}	—	January 17, 2007	Kitt Peak	Spacewatch	·	1.6 km	MPC · JPL
517461	2014 OZ_{386}	—	March 12, 2013	Kitt Peak	Spacewatch	·	1.5 km	MPC · JPL
517462	2014 OK_{389}	—	July 28, 2008	Siding Spring	SSS	·	3.0 km	MPC · JPL
517463	2014 OU_{399}	—	January 22, 2006	Mount Lemmon	Mount Lemmon Survey	·	2.0 km	MPC · JPL
517464	2014 OQ_{402}	—	March 10, 2007	Mount Lemmon	Mount Lemmon Survey	·	1.7 km	MPC · JPL
517465	2014 OQ_{403}	—	March 9, 2007	Mount Lemmon	Mount Lemmon Survey	·	2.4 km	MPC · JPL
517466	2014 PH_{13}	—	February 14, 2012	Haleakala	Pan-STARRS 1	·	2.1 km	MPC · JPL
517467	2014 PY_{17}	—	February 3, 2012	Haleakala	Pan-STARRS 1	EOS	2.2 km	MPC · JPL
517468	2014 PG_{26}	—	February 11, 2012	Mount Lemmon	Mount Lemmon Survey	·	2.4 km	MPC · JPL
517469	2014 PB_{29}	—	May 4, 2009	Mount Lemmon	Mount Lemmon Survey	·	1.8 km	MPC · JPL
517470	2014 PR_{30}	—	April 19, 2013	Haleakala	Pan-STARRS 1	·	2.5 km	MPC · JPL
517471	2014 PW_{39}	—	March 13, 2012	Mount Lemmon	Mount Lemmon Survey	·	2.5 km	MPC · JPL
517472	2014 PO_{52}	—	January 31, 2006	Mount Lemmon	Mount Lemmon Survey	·	2.5 km	MPC · JPL
517473	2014 PD_{72}	—	April 14, 2008	Kitt Peak	Spacewatch	KOR	1.1 km	MPC · JPL
517474	2014 PV_{72}	—	March 26, 2007	Mount Lemmon	Mount Lemmon Survey	·	2.0 km	MPC · JPL
517475	2014 PH_{73}	—	January 30, 2011	Mount Lemmon	Mount Lemmon Survey	·	3.1 km	MPC · JPL
517476	2014 QQ_{27}	—	October 17, 2003	Kitt Peak	Spacewatch	·	2.9 km	MPC · JPL
517477	2014 QS_{29}	—	May 28, 2008	Kitt Peak	Spacewatch	·	1.4 km	MPC · JPL
517478	2014 QM_{52}	—	April 1, 2005	Kitt Peak	Spacewatch	·	900 m	MPC · JPL
517479	2014 QM_{90}	—	September 24, 2009	Kitt Peak	Spacewatch	EMA	2.5 km	MPC · JPL
517480	2014 QE_{118}	—	February 28, 2012	Haleakala	Pan-STARRS 1	·	2.8 km	MPC · JPL
517481	2014 QW_{138}	—	October 15, 2009	Mount Lemmon	Mount Lemmon Survey	·	1.6 km	MPC · JPL
517482	2014 QY_{145}	—	September 28, 2009	Mount Lemmon	Mount Lemmon Survey	·	2.2 km	MPC · JPL
517483	2014 QJ_{153}	—	April 13, 2013	Haleakala	Pan-STARRS 1	EOS	1.7 km	MPC · JPL
517484	2014 QM_{165}	—	May 1, 2009	Mount Lemmon	Mount Lemmon Survey	·	1.6 km	MPC · JPL
517485	2014 QJ_{166}	—	January 19, 2012	Haleakala	Pan-STARRS 1	T_{j} (2.97)	3.8 km	MPC · JPL
517486	2014 QE_{175}	—	May 8, 2013	Haleakala	Pan-STARRS 1	·	2.1 km	MPC · JPL
517487	2014 QG_{176}	—	May 8, 2013	Haleakala	Pan-STARRS 1	·	1.4 km	MPC · JPL
517488	2014 QE_{225}	—	February 7, 2010	WISE	WISE	·	3.7 km	MPC · JPL
517489	2014 QQ_{225}	—	September 15, 2009	Kitt Peak	Spacewatch	·	2.2 km	MPC · JPL
517490	2014 QC_{227}	—	December 22, 2012	Haleakala	Pan-STARRS 1	·	2.0 km	MPC · JPL
517491	2014 QY_{242}	—	August 22, 2014	Haleakala	Pan-STARRS 1	·	2.9 km	MPC · JPL
517492	2014 QC_{243}	—	September 16, 2009	Mount Lemmon	Mount Lemmon Survey	·	2.0 km	MPC · JPL
517493	2014 QE_{245}	—	August 22, 2014	Haleakala	Pan-STARRS 1	·	3.0 km	MPC · JPL
517494	2014 QW_{252}	—	March 16, 2012	Mount Lemmon	Mount Lemmon Survey	·	2.3 km	MPC · JPL
517495	2014 QB_{288}	—	May 16, 2009	Kitt Peak	Spacewatch	·	1.5 km	MPC · JPL
517496	2014 QB_{289}	—	August 25, 2014	Haleakala	Pan-STARRS 1	·	2.6 km	MPC · JPL
517497	2014 QN_{292}	—	April 16, 2013	Haleakala	Pan-STARRS 1	·	1.9 km	MPC · JPL
517498	2014 QL_{299}	—	August 27, 2009	Kitt Peak	Spacewatch	EMA	2.9 km	MPC · JPL
517499	2014 QG_{304}	—	April 30, 2013	Kitt Peak	Spacewatch	·	2.2 km	MPC · JPL
517500	2014 QU_{307}	—	November 20, 2009	Kitt Peak	Spacewatch	THM	2.2 km	MPC · JPL

== 517501–517600 ==
back to top

Designation			Discovery			Properties		Ref
Permanent	Provisional	Named after	Date	Site	Discoverer(s)	Category	Diam.	Ref
517501	2014 QG_{324}	—	March 10, 2007	Kitt Peak	Spacewatch	·	2.7 km	MPC · JPL
517502	2014 QH_{326}	—	February 28, 2012	Haleakala	Pan-STARRS 1	·	2.7 km	MPC · JPL
517503	2014 QD_{335}	—	February 8, 2011	Mount Lemmon	Mount Lemmon Survey	·	1.7 km	MPC · JPL
517504	2014 QS_{343}	—	February 10, 2008	Kitt Peak	Spacewatch	BRA	1.7 km	MPC · JPL
517505	2014 QA_{369}	—	September 15, 2009	Kitt Peak	Spacewatch	·	2.4 km	MPC · JPL
517506	2014 QY_{375}	—	October 14, 2009	Mount Lemmon	Mount Lemmon Survey	VER	2.3 km	MPC · JPL
517507	2014 QW_{400}	—	January 31, 2006	Mount Lemmon	Mount Lemmon Survey	URS	2.4 km	MPC · JPL
517508	2014 QC_{430}	—	March 17, 2013	Mount Lemmon	Mount Lemmon Survey	·	2.0 km	MPC · JPL
517509	2014 QJ_{447}	—	October 14, 2009	Mount Lemmon	Mount Lemmon Survey	(159)	2.8 km	MPC · JPL
517510	2014 QT_{447}	—	June 18, 2013	Haleakala	Pan-STARRS 1	TIR	3.1 km	MPC · JPL
517511	2014 QX_{449}	—	January 12, 2011	Kitt Peak	Spacewatch	·	3.1 km	MPC · JPL
517512	2014 QW_{450}	—	August 23, 2014	Haleakala	Pan-STARRS 1	·	2.6 km	MPC · JPL
517513	2014 QD_{451}	—	March 20, 2007	Mount Lemmon	Mount Lemmon Survey	·	2.1 km	MPC · JPL
517514	2014 QK_{451}	—	August 31, 2014	Haleakala	Pan-STARRS 1	·	2.6 km	MPC · JPL
517515	2014 QN_{451}	—	February 25, 2010	WISE	WISE	·	3.6 km	MPC · JPL
517516	2014 QB_{452}	—	May 11, 2013	Mount Lemmon	Mount Lemmon Survey	·	2.2 km	MPC · JPL
517517	2014 QO_{452}	—	May 12, 2013	Mount Lemmon	Mount Lemmon Survey	·	1.4 km	MPC · JPL
517518	2014 QP_{452}	—	November 3, 2010	Mount Lemmon	Mount Lemmon Survey	·	2.4 km	MPC · JPL
517519	2014 QQ_{452}	—	August 22, 2014	Haleakala	Pan-STARRS 1	CYB	2.8 km	MPC · JPL
517520	2014 QV_{452}	—	September 6, 2008	Kitt Peak	Spacewatch	·	2.4 km	MPC · JPL
517521	2014 QY_{452}	—	October 26, 2008	Mount Lemmon	Mount Lemmon Survey	·	2.7 km	MPC · JPL
517522	2014 QZ_{452}	—	September 28, 2008	Mount Lemmon	Mount Lemmon Survey	THM	1.9 km	MPC · JPL
517523	2014 QW_{454}	—	September 18, 2003	Kitt Peak	Spacewatch	·	2.6 km	MPC · JPL
517524	2014 QB_{456}	—	March 16, 2012	Kitt Peak	Spacewatch	·	3.1 km	MPC · JPL
517525	2014 RQ_{6}	—	September 1, 2014	Mount Lemmon	Mount Lemmon Survey	·	580 m	MPC · JPL
517526	2014 RU_{6}	—	April 7, 2008	Mount Lemmon	Mount Lemmon Survey	·	1.2 km	MPC · JPL
517527	2014 RB_{22}	—	August 20, 2014	Haleakala	Pan-STARRS 1	·	2.5 km	MPC · JPL
517528	2014 RZ_{41}	—	October 27, 2009	Mount Lemmon	Mount Lemmon Survey	·	2.9 km	MPC · JPL
517529	2014 RF_{44}	—	November 18, 2003	Palomar	NEAT	·	3.2 km	MPC · JPL
517530	2014 RJ_{60}	—	February 26, 2012	Kitt Peak	Spacewatch	·	2.8 km	MPC · JPL
517531	2014 RL_{65}	—	May 14, 2008	Mount Lemmon	Mount Lemmon Survey	·	2.9 km	MPC · JPL
517532	2014 SW	—	October 25, 2005	Mount Lemmon	Mount Lemmon Survey	·	2.9 km	MPC · JPL
517533	2014 SF_{59}	—	October 24, 2009	Kitt Peak	Spacewatch	·	2.4 km	MPC · JPL
517534	2014 SY_{98}	—	September 3, 2008	Kitt Peak	Spacewatch	·	2.8 km	MPC · JPL
517535	2014 SP_{133}	—	July 25, 2008	Siding Spring	SSS	·	3.0 km	MPC · JPL
517536	2014 SZ_{142}	—	April 9, 2013	Haleakala	Pan-STARRS 1	·	1.6 km	MPC · JPL
517537	2014 SU_{154}	—	September 28, 2001	Palomar	NEAT	·	1.0 km	MPC · JPL
517538	2014 SF_{156}	—	August 11, 1997	Kitt Peak	Spacewatch	THM	2.1 km	MPC · JPL
517539	2014 SV_{215}	—	June 19, 2006	Mount Lemmon	Mount Lemmon Survey	·	1.4 km	MPC · JPL
517540	2014 SX_{215}	—	September 20, 2014	Haleakala	Pan-STARRS 1	·	1.9 km	MPC · JPL
517541	2014 SP_{216}	—	January 3, 2012	Kitt Peak	Spacewatch	·	730 m	MPC · JPL
517542	2014 SY_{223}	—	September 23, 2014	Kitt Peak	Spacewatch	·	460 m	MPC · JPL
517543	2014 SW_{280}	—	March 5, 2008	Mount Lemmon	Mount Lemmon Survey	·	1.8 km	MPC · JPL
517544	2014 SG_{285}	—	March 5, 2010	WISE	WISE	T_{j} (2.98)	4.7 km	MPC · JPL
517545	2014 SL_{290}	—	September 17, 2009	Kitt Peak	Spacewatch	·	2.3 km	MPC · JPL
517546	2014 SO_{299}	—	September 22, 2008	Catalina	CSS	·	3.5 km	MPC · JPL
517547	2014 SY_{304}	—	February 26, 2007	Mount Lemmon	Mount Lemmon Survey	·	3.7 km	MPC · JPL
517548	2014 SM_{312}	—	August 4, 2003	Kitt Peak	Spacewatch	·	3.7 km	MPC · JPL
517549	2014 SK_{330}	—	January 16, 2008	Kitt Peak	Spacewatch	·	1.1 km	MPC · JPL
517550	2014 SV_{330}	—	February 20, 2012	Haleakala	Pan-STARRS 1	TIR	3.3 km	MPC · JPL
517551	2014 SB_{351}	—	May 26, 2003	Kitt Peak	Spacewatch	H	470 m	MPC · JPL
517552	2014 SE_{353}	—	February 4, 2005	Mount Lemmon	Mount Lemmon Survey	·	3.1 km	MPC · JPL
517553	2014 SD_{354}	—	September 6, 2008	Catalina	CSS	LIX	3.2 km	MPC · JPL
517554	2014 SC_{355}	—	February 19, 2010	Kitt Peak	Spacewatch	·	1.9 km	MPC · JPL
517555	2014 SD_{355}	—	September 29, 2014	Haleakala	Pan-STARRS 1	·	2.2 km	MPC · JPL
517556	2014 TL_{6}	—	September 21, 2008	Catalina	CSS	·	2.7 km	MPC · JPL
517557	2014 TV_{6}	—	October 19, 2003	Kitt Peak	Spacewatch	·	2.4 km	MPC · JPL
517558	2014 TE_{8}	—	November 19, 2006	Kitt Peak	Spacewatch	·	880 m	MPC · JPL
517559	2014 TB_{9}	—	March 15, 2007	Mount Lemmon	Mount Lemmon Survey	·	2.9 km	MPC · JPL
517560	2014 TH_{38}	—	October 12, 2009	Mount Lemmon	Mount Lemmon Survey	EOS	1.6 km	MPC · JPL
517561	2014 TY_{45}	—	April 28, 2008	Kitt Peak	Spacewatch	H	360 m	MPC · JPL
517562	2014 TQ_{47}	—	April 19, 2007	Mount Lemmon	Mount Lemmon Survey	·	2.8 km	MPC · JPL
517563	2014 TP_{54}	—	June 13, 2005	Mount Lemmon	Mount Lemmon Survey	·	1.4 km	MPC · JPL
517564	2014 TL_{57}	—	August 31, 2014	Haleakala	Pan-STARRS 1	·	910 m	MPC · JPL
517565	2014 TX_{58}	—	September 14, 2007	Mount Lemmon	Mount Lemmon Survey	·	560 m	MPC · JPL
517566	2014 TY_{66}	—	September 22, 2003	Kitt Peak	Spacewatch	THM	1.6 km	MPC · JPL
517567	2014 TX_{81}	—	October 3, 1997	Kitt Peak	Spacewatch	·	3.3 km	MPC · JPL
517568	2014 TH_{89}	—	July 13, 2013	Haleakala	Pan-STARRS 1	·	2.0 km	MPC · JPL
517569	2014 UN_{1}	—	April 22, 2007	Kitt Peak	Spacewatch	·	1.8 km	MPC · JPL
517570	2014 UV_{24}	—	October 29, 2003	Kitt Peak	Spacewatch	·	2.0 km	MPC · JPL
517571	2014 UF_{35}	—	September 30, 2003	Kitt Peak	Spacewatch	·	1.0 km	MPC · JPL
517572	2014 US_{50}	—	November 19, 2003	Kitt Peak	Spacewatch	·	2.6 km	MPC · JPL
517573	2014 UO_{68}	—	March 8, 2005	Mount Lemmon	Mount Lemmon Survey	·	1.1 km	MPC · JPL
517574	2014 UW_{85}	—	January 15, 2005	Kitt Peak	Spacewatch	L5	7.0 km	MPC · JPL
517575	2014 UW_{92}	—	December 2, 2005	Catalina	CSS	·	1.7 km	MPC · JPL
517576	2014 UK_{96}	—	October 10, 2010	Kitt Peak	Spacewatch	MAS	700 m	MPC · JPL
517577	2014 UW_{117}	—	November 11, 2006	Kitt Peak	Spacewatch	(5)	1.1 km	MPC · JPL
517578	2014 UW_{134}	—	October 8, 1993	Kitt Peak	Spacewatch	·	1.4 km	MPC · JPL
517579	2014 UF_{160}	—	March 17, 2013	Mount Lemmon	Mount Lemmon Survey	H	480 m	MPC · JPL
517580	2014 UZ_{170}	—	October 10, 2007	Mount Lemmon	Mount Lemmon Survey	·	530 m	MPC · JPL
517581	2014 UY_{230}	—	April 19, 2012	Mount Lemmon	Mount Lemmon Survey	EOS	1.6 km	MPC · JPL
517582	2014 VE_{5}	—	October 21, 2003	Kitt Peak	Spacewatch	·	2.7 km	MPC · JPL
517583	2014 VN_{22}	—	October 23, 2014	Kitt Peak	Spacewatch	·	930 m	MPC · JPL
517584	2014 WH_{26}	—	March 11, 2005	Mount Lemmon	Mount Lemmon Survey	·	750 m	MPC · JPL
517585	2014 WS_{43}	—	December 2, 2010	Mount Lemmon	Mount Lemmon Survey	(5)	1.1 km	MPC · JPL
517586	2014 WF_{62}	—	March 29, 2008	Kitt Peak	Spacewatch	·	1.6 km	MPC · JPL
517587	2014 WD_{71}	—	January 10, 2008	Mount Lemmon	Mount Lemmon Survey	·	1.2 km	MPC · JPL
517588	2014 WA_{83}	—	August 31, 2014	Haleakala	Pan-STARRS 1	V	590 m	MPC · JPL
517589	2014 WK_{93}	—	February 27, 2009	Kitt Peak	Spacewatch	·	680 m	MPC · JPL
517590	2014 WE_{96}	—	July 16, 2013	Haleakala	Pan-STARRS 1	·	2.0 km	MPC · JPL
517591	2014 WL_{118}	—	February 27, 2009	Catalina	CSS	·	770 m	MPC · JPL
517592	2014 WT_{118}	—	April 7, 2008	Kitt Peak	Spacewatch	L5	9.7 km	MPC · JPL
517593	2014 WC_{123}	—	September 15, 2009	Kitt Peak	Spacewatch	WIT	850 m	MPC · JPL
517594	2014 WX_{199}	—	March 31, 2008	Mount Lemmon	Mount Lemmon Survey	T_{j} (2.92)	6.2 km	MPC · JPL
517595	2014 WF_{232}	—	October 3, 2013	Haleakala	Pan-STARRS 1	L5	7.8 km	MPC · JPL
517596	2014 WJ_{276}	—	October 7, 2008	Mount Lemmon	Mount Lemmon Survey	·	2.5 km	MPC · JPL
517597	2014 WB_{356}	—	November 23, 2014	Haleakala	Pan-STARRS 1	H	450 m	MPC · JPL
517598	2014 WA_{360}	—	October 5, 2005	Catalina	CSS	·	2.4 km	MPC · JPL
517599	2014 WY_{364}	—	October 3, 2014	Haleakala	Pan-STARRS 1	H	480 m	MPC · JPL
517600	2014 WU_{366}	—	November 27, 2014	Mount Lemmon	Mount Lemmon Survey	H	550 m	MPC · JPL

== 517601–517700 ==
back to top

Designation			Discovery			Properties		Ref
Permanent	Provisional	Named after	Date	Site	Discoverer(s)	Category	Diam.	Ref
517601	2014 WP_{369}	—	May 27, 2008	Kitt Peak	Spacewatch	H	470 m	MPC · JPL
517602	2014 WS_{373}	—	October 7, 2010	Kitt Peak	Spacewatch	·	940 m	MPC · JPL
517603	2014 WT_{421}	—	October 22, 2005	Kitt Peak	Spacewatch	·	1.2 km	MPC · JPL
517604	2014 WL_{467}	—	December 31, 2008	Catalina	CSS	·	3.4 km	MPC · JPL
517605	2014 WQ_{469}	—	September 28, 2013	Mount Lemmon	Mount Lemmon Survey	EUN	1.3 km	MPC · JPL
517606	2014 WV_{478}	—	August 23, 2007	Kitt Peak	Spacewatch	EOS	2.0 km	MPC · JPL
517607	2014 WZ_{479}	—	November 28, 2014	Haleakala	Pan-STARRS 1	·	1.3 km	MPC · JPL
517608	2014 WY_{494}	—	October 14, 2013	Kitt Peak	Spacewatch	·	2.8 km	MPC · JPL
517609	2014 WF_{504}	—	February 7, 2011	Mount Lemmon	Mount Lemmon Survey	·	3.2 km	MPC · JPL
517610	2014 WU_{518}	—	May 12, 2012	Mount Lemmon	Mount Lemmon Survey	·	3.1 km	MPC · JPL
517611	2014 WG_{519}	—	April 30, 2006	Kitt Peak	Spacewatch	EOS	1.7 km	MPC · JPL
517612	2014 WH_{519}	—	March 27, 2011	Mount Lemmon	Mount Lemmon Survey	·	2.0 km	MPC · JPL
517613	2014 WJ_{519}	—	September 9, 2008	Mount Lemmon	Mount Lemmon Survey	·	2.3 km	MPC · JPL
517614	2014 WP_{519}	—	November 23, 2014	Haleakala	Pan-STARRS 1	·	1.4 km	MPC · JPL
517615	2014 WR_{519}	—	September 29, 2008	Mount Lemmon	Mount Lemmon Survey	·	2.7 km	MPC · JPL
517616	2014 WZ_{519}	—	November 28, 2014	Haleakala	Pan-STARRS 1	·	3.4 km	MPC · JPL
517617	2014 WB_{520}	—	November 29, 2014	Haleakala	Pan-STARRS 1	·	2.4 km	MPC · JPL
517618	2014 XF	—	January 16, 2007	Catalina	CSS	H	710 m	MPC · JPL
517619	2014 XP_{12}	—	November 4, 2014	Mount Lemmon	Mount Lemmon Survey	L5	7.6 km	MPC · JPL
517620	2014 XD_{41}	—	December 1, 2014	Haleakala	Pan-STARRS 1	H	510 m	MPC · JPL
517621	2014 YU_{1}	—	October 27, 2009	Mount Lemmon	Mount Lemmon Survey	·	1.8 km	MPC · JPL
517622	2014 YW_{7}	—	June 18, 2013	Haleakala	Pan-STARRS 1	·	670 m	MPC · JPL
517623	2014 YR_{10}	—	September 30, 2014	Mount Lemmon	Mount Lemmon Survey	·	2.0 km	MPC · JPL
517624	2014 YE_{16}	—	April 27, 2012	Haleakala	Pan-STARRS 1	V	580 m	MPC · JPL
517625	2014 YJ_{49}	—	November 27, 2009	Mount Lemmon	Mount Lemmon Survey	H	490 m	MPC · JPL
517626	2014 YK_{49}	—	November 3, 2010	Mount Lemmon	Mount Lemmon Survey	·	1.5 km	MPC · JPL
517627	2014 YN_{50}	—	December 20, 2014	Haleakala	Pan-STARRS 1	·	1 km	MPC · JPL
517628	2014 YY_{50}	—	September 1, 2008	Siding Spring	SSS	H	610 m	MPC · JPL
517629	2014 YD_{51}	—	November 19, 2003	Kitt Peak	Spacewatch	H	420 m	MPC · JPL
517630	2014 YX_{55}	—	March 14, 2011	Mount Lemmon	Mount Lemmon Survey	·	1.8 km	MPC · JPL
517631	2014 YY_{55}	—	December 21, 2014	Haleakala	Pan-STARRS 1	KOR	1.0 km	MPC · JPL
517632	2014 YA_{56}	—	May 6, 2011	Kitt Peak	Spacewatch	·	2.0 km	MPC · JPL
517633	2014 YD_{56}	—	September 29, 2008	Mount Lemmon	Mount Lemmon Survey	·	1.7 km	MPC · JPL
517634	2014 YG_{56}	—	September 24, 2008	Mount Lemmon	Mount Lemmon Survey	MAR	1.2 km	MPC · JPL
517635	2015 AB_{3}	—	June 12, 2011	Haleakala	Pan-STARRS 1	H	480 m	MPC · JPL
517636	2015 AB_{20}	—	December 10, 2010	Mount Lemmon	Mount Lemmon Survey	·	1.4 km	MPC · JPL
517637	2015 AW_{40}	—	April 24, 2011	Kitt Peak	Spacewatch	·	3.1 km	MPC · JPL
517638	2015 AJ_{197}	—	March 31, 2004	Kitt Peak	Spacewatch	MAS	740 m	MPC · JPL
517639	2015 AL_{255}	—	October 2, 2008	Catalina	CSS	·	3.5 km	MPC · JPL
517640	2015 AX_{283}	—	October 5, 2013	Haleakala	Pan-STARRS 1	HOF	2.1 km	MPC · JPL
517641	2015 BL_{4}	—	February 21, 2007	Mount Lemmon	Mount Lemmon Survey	H	500 m	MPC · JPL
517642	2015 BL_{24}	—	January 16, 2015	Haleakala	Pan-STARRS 1	H	550 m	MPC · JPL
517643	2015 BQ_{250}	—	January 27, 2007	Mount Lemmon	Mount Lemmon Survey	H	380 m	MPC · JPL
517644	2015 BL_{464}	—	January 20, 2015	Haleakala	Pan-STARRS 1	H	440 m	MPC · JPL
517645	2015 BP_{514}	—	June 17, 2005	Kitt Peak	Spacewatch	H	530 m	MPC · JPL
517646	2015 BU_{527}	—	January 19, 2015	Mount Lemmon	Mount Lemmon Survey	H	340 m	MPC · JPL
517647	2015 BX_{542}	—	February 25, 2006	Kitt Peak	Spacewatch	AGN	960 m	MPC · JPL
517648	2015 BA_{543}	—	August 17, 2012	Haleakala	Pan-STARRS 1	·	1.8 km	MPC · JPL
517649	2015 BB_{543}	—	March 6, 2011	Kitt Peak	Spacewatch	·	1.6 km	MPC · JPL
517650	2015 BD_{543}	—	August 3, 2008	Siding Spring	SSS	·	2.0 km	MPC · JPL
517651	2015 BJ_{543}	—	September 6, 2008	Kitt Peak	Spacewatch	·	1.5 km	MPC · JPL
517652	2015 BK_{543}	—	October 1, 2013	Kitt Peak	Spacewatch	·	1.8 km	MPC · JPL
517653	2015 BM_{543}	—	October 3, 2008	Mount Lemmon	Mount Lemmon Survey	NAE	1.9 km	MPC · JPL
517654	2015 BN_{543}	—	May 19, 2012	Mount Lemmon	Mount Lemmon Survey	·	1.7 km	MPC · JPL
517655	2015 BR_{543}	—	October 14, 2013	Kitt Peak	Spacewatch	WIT	800 m	MPC · JPL
517656	2015 BX_{543}	—	October 20, 2008	Mount Lemmon	Mount Lemmon Survey	·	1.3 km	MPC · JPL
517657	2015 BY_{543}	—	November 19, 2008	Mount Lemmon	Mount Lemmon Survey	KOR	1.0 km	MPC · JPL
517658	2015 BC_{544}	—	September 21, 2012	Mount Lemmon	Mount Lemmon Survey	·	2.8 km	MPC · JPL
517659	2015 BD_{544}	—	November 1, 2008	Mount Lemmon	Mount Lemmon Survey	AGN	1.1 km	MPC · JPL
517660	2015 BG_{544}	—	October 4, 2008	Mount Lemmon	Mount Lemmon Survey	·	2.1 km	MPC · JPL
517661	2015 BH_{544}	—	November 28, 2013	Mount Lemmon	Mount Lemmon Survey	·	1.6 km	MPC · JPL
517662	2015 BK_{544}	—	December 26, 2014	Haleakala	Pan-STARRS 1	·	2.6 km	MPC · JPL
517663	2015 BM_{544}	—	September 27, 2008	Mount Lemmon	Mount Lemmon Survey	·	2.2 km	MPC · JPL
517664	2015 BO_{544}	—	November 1, 2008	Mount Lemmon	Mount Lemmon Survey	·	1.7 km	MPC · JPL
517665	2015 BR_{544}	—	October 6, 2008	Mount Lemmon	Mount Lemmon Survey	·	1.8 km	MPC · JPL
517666	2015 BT_{544}	—	September 24, 2008	Mount Lemmon	Mount Lemmon Survey	·	1.6 km	MPC · JPL
517667	2015 BU_{544}	—	October 29, 2008	Mount Lemmon	Mount Lemmon Survey	·	1.9 km	MPC · JPL
517668	2015 BV_{544}	—	December 24, 2013	Mount Lemmon	Mount Lemmon Survey	ADE	1.6 km	MPC · JPL
517669	2015 BW_{544}	—	January 31, 2015	Haleakala	Pan-STARRS 1	·	1.5 km	MPC · JPL
517670	2015 CY_{8}	—	July 16, 2013	Haleakala	Pan-STARRS 1	H	450 m	MPC · JPL
517671	2015 CB_{13}	—	August 2, 2008	Siding Spring	SSS	H	530 m	MPC · JPL
517672	2015 CE_{17}	—	March 25, 2010	Kitt Peak	Spacewatch	HYG	3.0 km	MPC · JPL
517673	2015 CL_{32}	—	February 10, 2011	Mount Lemmon	Mount Lemmon Survey	·	1.5 km	MPC · JPL
517674	2015 CF_{34}	—	December 16, 2014	Haleakala	Pan-STARRS 1	H	460 m	MPC · JPL
517675	2015 CM_{62}	—	October 25, 2008	Mount Lemmon	Mount Lemmon Survey	H	500 m	MPC · JPL
517676	2015 CO_{63}	—	December 3, 2010	Mount Lemmon	Mount Lemmon Survey	·	700 m	MPC · JPL
517677	2015 CT_{64}	—	November 9, 2009	Kitt Peak	Spacewatch	·	1.4 km	MPC · JPL
517678	2015 CY_{66}	—	November 9, 2013	Mount Lemmon	Mount Lemmon Survey	·	1.4 km	MPC · JPL
517679	2015 DO_{96}	—	February 16, 2012	Haleakala	Pan-STARRS 1	·	970 m	MPC · JPL
517680	2015 DZ_{110}	—	October 7, 1996	Kitt Peak	Spacewatch	·	3.2 km	MPC · JPL
517681	2015 DE_{198}	—	February 22, 2015	Haleakala	Pan-STARRS 1	APO · PHA	580 m	MPC · JPL
517682	2015 DD_{216}	—	January 27, 2007	Mount Lemmon	Mount Lemmon Survey	H	510 m	MPC · JPL
517683	2015 DO_{230}	—	December 27, 2006	Mount Lemmon	Mount Lemmon Survey	3:2	4.7 km	MPC · JPL
517684	2015 DF_{232}	—	December 22, 1998	Kitt Peak	Spacewatch	·	1.7 km	MPC · JPL
517685	2015 DJ_{232}	—	January 6, 2010	Mount Lemmon	Mount Lemmon Survey	AEO	1.0 km	MPC · JPL
517686	2015 DK_{232}	—	February 20, 2015	Haleakala	Pan-STARRS 1	EUN	1.3 km	MPC · JPL
517687	2015 DL_{232}	—	December 4, 2013	Haleakala	Pan-STARRS 1	·	2.0 km	MPC · JPL
517688	2015 DM_{232}	—	October 8, 2008	Mount Lemmon	Mount Lemmon Survey	AGN	1.1 km	MPC · JPL
517689	2015 DN_{232}	—	October 26, 2008	Mount Lemmon	Mount Lemmon Survey	·	1.9 km	MPC · JPL
517690	2015 DO_{232}	—	February 26, 2015	Haleakala	Pan-STARRS 1	EUN	1.2 km	MPC · JPL
517691	2015 DP_{232}	—	December 27, 2009	Kitt Peak	Spacewatch	·	1.3 km	MPC · JPL
517692	2015 DQ_{232}	—	February 15, 2010	Mount Lemmon	Mount Lemmon Survey	·	2.0 km	MPC · JPL
517693	2015 DR_{232}	—	January 30, 2006	Kitt Peak	Spacewatch	·	1.4 km	MPC · JPL
517694	2015 DS_{232}	—	November 2, 2008	Mount Lemmon	Mount Lemmon Survey	·	1.3 km	MPC · JPL
517695	2015 DT_{232}	—	December 29, 2008	Mount Lemmon	Mount Lemmon Survey	·	3.1 km	MPC · JPL
517696	2015 EM	—	June 11, 2013	Mount Lemmon	Mount Lemmon Survey	H	670 m	MPC · JPL
517697	2015 ED_{74}	—	September 6, 2008	Kitt Peak	Spacewatch	H	540 m	MPC · JPL
517698	2015 FB_{37}	—	February 12, 2012	Haleakala	Pan-STARRS 1	H	600 m	MPC · JPL
517699	2015 FM_{45}	—	October 2, 2006	Mount Lemmon	Mount Lemmon Survey	·	500 m	MPC · JPL
517700	2015 FD_{403}	—	October 10, 2012	Haleakala	Pan-STARRS 1	·	1.2 km	MPC · JPL

== 517701–517800 ==
back to top

Designation			Discovery			Properties		Ref
Permanent	Provisional	Named after	Date	Site	Discoverer(s)	Category	Diam.	Ref
517701	2015 FE_{403}	—	May 26, 2007	Mount Lemmon	Mount Lemmon Survey	·	1.1 km	MPC · JPL
517702	2015 FF_{403}	—	March 21, 2015	Haleakala	Pan-STARRS 1	·	1.7 km	MPC · JPL
517703	2015 FK_{403}	—	August 7, 2008	Kitt Peak	Spacewatch	·	1.1 km	MPC · JPL
517704	2015 FM_{403}	—	October 6, 2008	Mount Lemmon	Mount Lemmon Survey	·	1.5 km	MPC · JPL
517705	2015 FP_{403}	—	March 28, 2015	Haleakala	Pan-STARRS 1	·	1.3 km	MPC · JPL
517706	2015 FQ_{403}	—	October 11, 2012	Haleakala	Pan-STARRS 1	EUN	890 m	MPC · JPL
517707	2015 FS_{403}	—	June 8, 2011	Mount Lemmon	Mount Lemmon Survey	·	1.9 km	MPC · JPL
517708	2015 GA_{52}	—	December 31, 2013	Kitt Peak	Spacewatch	·	1.3 km	MPC · JPL
517709	2015 HM_{7}	—	March 15, 2015	Haleakala	Pan-STARRS 1	H	520 m	MPC · JPL
517710	2015 HV_{30}	—	May 22, 1999	Kitt Peak	Spacewatch	·	700 m	MPC · JPL
517711	2015 HL_{91}	—	August 17, 2009	Kitt Peak	Spacewatch	·	540 m	MPC · JPL
517712	2015 HO_{155}	—	May 6, 2010	Mount Lemmon	Mount Lemmon Survey	·	2.6 km	MPC · JPL
517713	2015 HX_{172}	—	August 30, 2013	Haleakala	Pan-STARRS 1	H	520 m	MPC · JPL
517714	2015 JF_{3}	—	May 15, 2015	Haleakala	Pan-STARRS 1	·	880 m	MPC · JPL
517715	2015 KH_{36}	—	April 1, 2011	Mount Lemmon	Mount Lemmon Survey	(2076)	860 m	MPC · JPL
517716	2015 KS_{36}	—	October 11, 2012	Mount Lemmon	Mount Lemmon Survey	·	600 m	MPC · JPL
517717	2015 KZ_{120}	—	May 20, 2015	Haleakala	Pan-STARRS 1	T_{j} (0.38) · centaur	50 km	MPC · JPL
517718	2015 KT_{122}	—	November 11, 2007	Mount Lemmon	Mount Lemmon Survey	·	1.2 km	MPC · JPL
517719	2015 KX_{135}	—	November 1, 2013	Kitt Peak	Spacewatch	·	700 m	MPC · JPL
517720	2015 KC_{143}	—	April 6, 2008	Kitt Peak	Spacewatch	·	600 m	MPC · JPL
517721	2015 KV_{148}	—	April 23, 2007	Kitt Peak	Spacewatch	V	650 m	MPC · JPL
517722	2015 KS_{167}	—	October 7, 2008	Mount Lemmon	Mount Lemmon Survey	·	1.2 km	MPC · JPL
517723	2015 LU_{4}	—	October 26, 2009	Mount Lemmon	Mount Lemmon Survey	·	680 m	MPC · JPL
517724	2015 LK_{10}	—	October 27, 2005	Catalina	CSS	PHO	1.2 km	MPC · JPL
517725	2015 LV_{13}	—	April 14, 2008	Mount Lemmon	Mount Lemmon Survey	·	690 m	MPC · JPL
517726	2015 LZ_{22}	—	September 17, 2009	Mount Lemmon	Mount Lemmon Survey	·	570 m	MPC · JPL
517727	2015 LF_{35}	—	March 27, 2011	Mount Lemmon	Mount Lemmon Survey	·	790 m	MPC · JPL
517728	2015 LU_{42}	—	November 12, 2013	Mount Lemmon	Mount Lemmon Survey	·	2.1 km	MPC · JPL
517729	2015 LZ_{42}	—	March 28, 2008	Mount Lemmon	Mount Lemmon Survey	·	640 m	MPC · JPL
517730	2015 MN_{6}	—	September 15, 2012	Kitt Peak	Spacewatch	·	590 m	MPC · JPL
517731	2015 MQ_{7}	—	June 7, 2008	Kitt Peak	Spacewatch	·	650 m	MPC · JPL
517732	2015 MZ_{9}	—	June 10, 2011	Mount Lemmon	Mount Lemmon Survey	·	1.1 km	MPC · JPL
517733	2015 MM_{47}	—	December 31, 2008	Kitt Peak	Spacewatch	·	940 m	MPC · JPL
517734	2015 MS_{51}	—	November 5, 2007	Kitt Peak	Spacewatch	·	1.2 km	MPC · JPL
517735	2015 MN_{54}	—	October 18, 2012	Haleakala	Pan-STARRS 1	·	560 m	MPC · JPL
517736	2015 MD_{56}	—	December 31, 2005	Kitt Peak	Spacewatch	·	1.3 km	MPC · JPL
517737	2015 MU_{70}	—	March 20, 2007	Kitt Peak	Spacewatch	·	880 m	MPC · JPL
517738	2015 MT_{88}	—	September 25, 2011	Haleakala	Pan-STARRS 1	GEF	1.1 km	MPC · JPL
517739	2015 MS_{101}	—	September 25, 2008	Kitt Peak	Spacewatch	·	900 m	MPC · JPL
517740	2015 MX_{109}	—	June 26, 2015	Haleakala	Pan-STARRS 1	·	920 m	MPC · JPL
517741	2015 MS_{114}	—	November 8, 2009	Kitt Peak	Spacewatch	·	940 m	MPC · JPL
517742	2015 MT_{115}	—	January 7, 2013	Haleakala	Pan-STARRS 1	·	1.2 km	MPC · JPL
517743	2015 MD_{116}	—	July 19, 2011	Haleakala	Pan-STARRS 1	·	1.2 km	MPC · JPL
517744	2015 MJ_{117}	—	September 14, 2005	Catalina	CSS	·	970 m	MPC · JPL
517745	2015 MV_{123}	—	May 17, 2001	Kitt Peak	Spacewatch	·	600 m	MPC · JPL
517746	2015 MZ_{134}	—	June 27, 2015	Haleakala	Pan-STARRS 1	·	2.2 km	MPC · JPL
517747	2015 MO_{135}	—	January 27, 2012	Mount Lemmon	Mount Lemmon Survey	EOS	1.7 km	MPC · JPL
517748	2015 MP_{137}	—	September 11, 2007	Mount Lemmon	Mount Lemmon Survey	·	1.4 km	MPC · JPL
517749	2015 MS_{137}	—	October 23, 2003	Kitt Peak	Spacewatch	·	2.1 km	MPC · JPL
517750	2015 NO_{9}	—	October 22, 2008	Kitt Peak	Spacewatch	·	1.3 km	MPC · JPL
517751	2015 NY_{18}	—	October 12, 2007	Mount Lemmon	Mount Lemmon Survey	·	1.6 km	MPC · JPL
517752	2015 NW_{24}	—	October 17, 2007	Mount Lemmon	Mount Lemmon Survey	·	1.5 km	MPC · JPL
517753	2015 OZ_{1}	—	April 1, 2011	Kitt Peak	Spacewatch	·	820 m	MPC · JPL
517754	2015 OY_{2}	—	April 6, 2008	Catalina	CSS	·	720 m	MPC · JPL
517755	2015 OS_{13}	—	October 10, 2008	Kitt Peak	Spacewatch	MAS	560 m	MPC · JPL
517756	2015 OK_{14}	—	April 12, 2011	Kitt Peak	Spacewatch	·	690 m	MPC · JPL
517757	2015 OG_{23}	—	January 5, 2006	Kitt Peak	Spacewatch	·	1.1 km	MPC · JPL
517758	2015 OU_{23}	—	August 24, 2008	Kitt Peak	Spacewatch	NYS	940 m	MPC · JPL
517759	2015 OK_{28}	—	September 23, 2011	Haleakala	Pan-STARRS 1	(5)	1.0 km	MPC · JPL
517760	2015 OD_{33}	—	October 20, 2008	Kitt Peak	Spacewatch	·	840 m	MPC · JPL
517761	2015 OC_{42}	—	June 22, 2011	Mount Lemmon	Mount Lemmon Survey	MAS	570 m	MPC · JPL
517762	2015 OA_{44}	—	May 13, 2011	Mount Lemmon	Mount Lemmon Survey	V	480 m	MPC · JPL
517763	2015 OX_{65}	—	January 27, 2006	Mount Lemmon	Mount Lemmon Survey	·	1.3 km	MPC · JPL
517764	2015 OX_{73}	—	September 21, 2011	Catalina	CSS	EUN	1.1 km	MPC · JPL
517765	2015 OD_{77}	—	October 13, 2005	Mount Lemmon	Mount Lemmon Survey	·	2.1 km	MPC · JPL
517766	2015 OG_{85}	—	February 21, 2007	Kitt Peak	Spacewatch	V	550 m	MPC · JPL
517767	2015 OQ_{85}	—	January 17, 2013	Haleakala	Pan-STARRS 1	·	920 m	MPC · JPL
517768	2015 OY_{86}	—	November 14, 2007	Kitt Peak	Spacewatch	·	1.5 km	MPC · JPL
517769	2015 OD_{87}	—	February 22, 2009	Kitt Peak	Spacewatch	·	1.1 km	MPC · JPL
517770	2015 OX_{88}	—	November 3, 2008	Mount Lemmon	Mount Lemmon Survey	V	530 m	MPC · JPL
517771	2015 OZ_{88}	—	January 30, 2009	Mount Lemmon	Mount Lemmon Survey	·	1.3 km	MPC · JPL
517772	2015 OA_{89}	—	January 15, 2010	Kitt Peak	Spacewatch	·	860 m	MPC · JPL
517773	2015 OB_{89}	—	May 6, 2014	Haleakala	Pan-STARRS 1	EOS	1.5 km	MPC · JPL
517774	2015 OC_{89}	—	February 26, 2014	Haleakala	Pan-STARRS 1	·	730 m	MPC · JPL
517775	2015 OD_{89}	—	January 6, 2005	Catalina	CSS	(5)	1.1 km	MPC · JPL
517776	2015 OU_{89}	—	April 22, 2013	Mount Lemmon	Mount Lemmon Survey	·	3.2 km	MPC · JPL
517777	2015 OV_{89}	—	May 4, 2009	Mount Lemmon	Mount Lemmon Survey	·	2.3 km	MPC · JPL
517778	2015 OB_{90}	—	January 18, 2009	Kitt Peak	Spacewatch	·	1.1 km	MPC · JPL
517779	2015 PK_{1}	—	February 16, 2010	Kitt Peak	Spacewatch	NYS	1.4 km	MPC · JPL
517780	2015 PQ_{2}	—	February 26, 2014	Mount Lemmon	Mount Lemmon Survey	V	570 m	MPC · JPL
517781	2015 PM_{6}	—	October 30, 2005	Kitt Peak	Spacewatch	·	730 m	MPC · JPL
517782	2015 PB_{11}	—	August 3, 2011	Haleakala	Pan-STARRS 1	·	1.2 km	MPC · JPL
517783	2015 PQ_{12}	—	April 16, 2007	Mount Lemmon	Mount Lemmon Survey	·	930 m	MPC · JPL
517784	2015 PA_{31}	—	June 11, 2007	Siding Spring	SSS	·	1.6 km	MPC · JPL
517785	2015 PL_{31}	—	February 25, 2007	Kitt Peak	Spacewatch	V	640 m	MPC · JPL
517786	2015 PR_{33}	—	February 26, 2014	Haleakala	Pan-STARRS 1	·	1.3 km	MPC · JPL
517787	2015 PH_{36}	—	March 14, 2011	Mount Lemmon	Mount Lemmon Survey	·	710 m	MPC · JPL
517788	2015 PH_{45}	—	June 5, 2011	Mount Lemmon	Mount Lemmon Survey	·	1.2 km	MPC · JPL
517789	2015 PS_{45}	—	October 11, 2004	Kitt Peak	Spacewatch	·	1.1 km	MPC · JPL
517790	2015 PL_{47}	—	June 11, 2011	Mount Lemmon	Mount Lemmon Survey	·	1.0 km	MPC · JPL
517791	2015 PT_{56}	—	February 18, 2010	WISE	WISE	·	3.1 km	MPC · JPL
517792	2015 PM_{77}	—	September 9, 2008	Mount Lemmon	Mount Lemmon Survey	·	970 m	MPC · JPL
517793	2015 PH_{108}	—	April 13, 2011	Mount Lemmon	Mount Lemmon Survey	·	800 m	MPC · JPL
517794	2015 PO_{247}	—	January 5, 2013	Kitt Peak	Spacewatch	·	1.1 km	MPC · JPL
517795	2015 PY_{287}	—	February 2, 2009	Mount Lemmon	Mount Lemmon Survey	HNS	1.1 km	MPC · JPL
517796	2015 PZ_{299}	—	February 26, 2014	Haleakala	Pan-STARRS 1	·	1.1 km	MPC · JPL
517797	2015 PD_{304}	—	June 15, 2010	WISE	WISE	NAE	2.1 km	MPC · JPL
517798	2015 PP_{304}	—	July 28, 2011	Siding Spring	SSS	·	1.4 km	MPC · JPL
517799	2015 PU_{304}	—	March 1, 2009	Mount Lemmon	Mount Lemmon Survey	·	1.3 km	MPC · JPL
517800	2015 PU_{308}	—	October 1, 2005	Kitt Peak	Spacewatch	·	680 m	MPC · JPL

== 517801–517900 ==
back to top

Designation			Discovery			Properties		Ref
Permanent	Provisional	Named after	Date	Site	Discoverer(s)	Category	Diam.	Ref
517801	2015 PK_{309}	—	July 28, 2011	Haleakala	Pan-STARRS 1	·	1.4 km	MPC · JPL
517802	2015 PJ_{310}	—	November 1, 2005	Kitt Peak	Spacewatch	·	850 m	MPC · JPL
517803	2015 PG_{314}	—	March 17, 2013	Mount Lemmon	Mount Lemmon Survey	·	1.9 km	MPC · JPL
517804	2015 PX_{315}	—	October 8, 2008	Mount Lemmon	Mount Lemmon Survey	·	1.4 km	MPC · JPL
517805	2015 PE_{316}	—	May 3, 2014	Mount Lemmon	Mount Lemmon Survey	·	960 m	MPC · JPL
517806	2015 PK_{316}	—	September 28, 2011	Mount Lemmon	Mount Lemmon Survey	·	1.6 km	MPC · JPL
517807	2015 PL_{316}	—	August 27, 2009	Kitt Peak	Spacewatch	·	2.9 km	MPC · JPL
517808	2015 QU_{5}	—	December 9, 2012	Haleakala	Pan-STARRS 1	·	1.1 km	MPC · JPL
517809	2015 QX_{12}	—	November 20, 2006	Kitt Peak	Spacewatch	·	1.8 km	MPC · JPL
517810	2015 QA_{13}	—	July 4, 2014	Haleakala	Pan-STARRS 1	EOS	1.8 km	MPC · JPL
517811	2015 QK_{14}	—	April 30, 2014	Haleakala	Pan-STARRS 1	·	690 m	MPC · JPL
517812	2015 QO_{14}	—	June 18, 2010	Mount Lemmon	Mount Lemmon Survey	·	1.5 km	MPC · JPL
517813	2015 QR_{14}	—	August 21, 2015	Haleakala	Pan-STARRS 1	·	2.5 km	MPC · JPL
517814	2015 RG_{11}	—	September 14, 2007	Kitt Peak	Spacewatch	·	900 m	MPC · JPL
517815	2015 RX_{18}	—	July 22, 2011	Haleakala	Pan-STARRS 1	·	1.2 km	MPC · JPL
517816	2015 RH_{20}	—	February 28, 2014	Haleakala	Pan-STARRS 1	·	1.3 km	MPC · JPL
517817	2015 RP_{22}	—	September 23, 2008	Mount Lemmon	Mount Lemmon Survey	·	1.1 km	MPC · JPL
517818	2015 RH_{29}	—	March 4, 2014	Haleakala	Pan-STARRS 1	·	1.7 km	MPC · JPL
517819	2015 RN_{29}	—	March 17, 2007	Kitt Peak	Spacewatch	·	1.0 km	MPC · JPL
517820	2015 RX_{31}	—	April 5, 2014	Haleakala	Pan-STARRS 1	PHO	1.1 km	MPC · JPL
517821	2015 RC_{38}	—	January 23, 2006	Mount Lemmon	Mount Lemmon Survey	SUL	2.0 km	MPC · JPL
517822	2015 RD_{39}	—	December 5, 2007	Kitt Peak	Spacewatch	·	1.6 km	MPC · JPL
517823	2015 RC_{46}	—	February 15, 2013	Haleakala	Pan-STARRS 1	·	1.3 km	MPC · JPL
517824	2015 RL_{46}	—	October 7, 2004	Kitt Peak	Spacewatch	·	2.7 km	MPC · JPL
517825	2015 RX_{53}	—	September 9, 2008	Mount Lemmon	Mount Lemmon Survey	·	960 m	MPC · JPL
517826	2015 RY_{72}	—	February 28, 2008	Mount Lemmon	Mount Lemmon Survey	KOR	1.2 km	MPC · JPL
517827	2015 RB_{76}	—	January 30, 2006	Kitt Peak	Spacewatch	·	2.5 km	MPC · JPL
517828	2015 RY_{77}	—	August 28, 2011	Haleakala	Pan-STARRS 1	·	1.1 km	MPC · JPL
517829	2015 RL_{82}	—	September 8, 2015	Haleakala	Pan-STARRS 1	APO	750 m	MPC · JPL
517830	2015 RF_{89}	—	February 14, 2013	Mount Lemmon	Mount Lemmon Survey	·	2.1 km	MPC · JPL
517831	2015 RB_{97}	—	October 9, 2004	Kitt Peak	Spacewatch	MAS	630 m	MPC · JPL
517832	2015 RY_{97}	—	November 20, 2006	Kitt Peak	Spacewatch	KOR	1.6 km	MPC · JPL
517833	2015 RP_{101}	—	July 23, 2015	Haleakala	Pan-STARRS 1	NYS	1.1 km	MPC · JPL
517834	2015 RY_{101}	—	February 20, 2012	Haleakala	Pan-STARRS 1	·	3.1 km	MPC · JPL
517835	2015 RE_{106}	—	November 3, 2004	Kitt Peak	Spacewatch	·	1.0 km	MPC · JPL
517836	2015 RN_{106}	—	August 24, 2008	Kitt Peak	Spacewatch	V	610 m	MPC · JPL
517837	2015 RO_{116}	—	May 9, 2007	Catalina	CSS	·	1.4 km	MPC · JPL
517838	2015 RQ_{116}	—	March 28, 2014	Mount Lemmon	Mount Lemmon Survey	·	1.4 km	MPC · JPL
517839	2015 RW_{116}	—	September 14, 2010	Kitt Peak	Spacewatch	·	3.6 km	MPC · JPL
517840	2015 RG_{117}	—	May 28, 2009	Mount Lemmon	Mount Lemmon Survey	·	2.2 km	MPC · JPL
517841	2015 RR_{117}	—	December 5, 2007	Mount Lemmon	Mount Lemmon Survey	MAR	1.1 km	MPC · JPL
517842	2015 RO_{118}	—	April 20, 2007	Kitt Peak	Spacewatch	·	1.1 km	MPC · JPL
517843	2015 RJ_{166}	—	September 21, 2011	Mount Lemmon	Mount Lemmon Survey	MAS	730 m	MPC · JPL
517844	2015 RR_{192}	—	February 26, 2014	Haleakala	Pan-STARRS 1	·	980 m	MPC · JPL
517845	2015 RY_{193}	—	July 12, 2005	Kitt Peak	Spacewatch	KOR	1.4 km	MPC · JPL
517846	2015 RQ_{195}	—	September 11, 2015	Haleakala	Pan-STARRS 1	·	2.2 km	MPC · JPL
517847	2015 RJ_{197}	—	June 12, 2011	Mount Lemmon	Mount Lemmon Survey	NYS	870 m	MPC · JPL
517848	2015 RD_{198}	—	June 14, 2007	Kitt Peak	Spacewatch	·	1.0 km	MPC · JPL
517849	2015 RO_{200}	—	February 28, 2008	Kitt Peak	Spacewatch	KOR	1.1 km	MPC · JPL
517850	2015 RN_{208}	—	March 28, 2008	Mount Lemmon	Mount Lemmon Survey	KOR	1.2 km	MPC · JPL
517851	2015 RV_{209}	—	September 11, 2005	Kitt Peak	Spacewatch	·	1.8 km	MPC · JPL
517852	2015 RD_{218}	—	March 13, 2007	Mount Lemmon	Mount Lemmon Survey	·	2.5 km	MPC · JPL
517853	2015 RT_{218}	—	March 3, 2013	Mount Lemmon	Mount Lemmon Survey	·	1.4 km	MPC · JPL
517854	2015 RW_{218}	—	August 18, 2006	Kitt Peak	Spacewatch	·	1.6 km	MPC · JPL
517855	2015 RK_{221}	—	October 8, 2005	Kitt Peak	Spacewatch	·	1.5 km	MPC · JPL
517856	2015 RM_{221}	—	October 3, 2006	Mount Lemmon	Mount Lemmon Survey	·	1.8 km	MPC · JPL
517857	2015 RT_{224}	—	September 11, 2015	Haleakala	Pan-STARRS 1	EOS	1.5 km	MPC · JPL
517858	2015 RS_{234}	—	September 15, 2006	Kitt Peak	Spacewatch	EUN	810 m	MPC · JPL
517859	2015 RO_{236}	—	February 25, 2007	Kitt Peak	Spacewatch	EOS	1.9 km	MPC · JPL
517860	2015 RN_{238}	—	August 12, 2015	Haleakala	Pan-STARRS 1	·	2.0 km	MPC · JPL
517861	2015 RO_{239}	—	November 27, 2011	Kitt Peak	Spacewatch	EUN	1.1 km	MPC · JPL
517862	2015 RT_{240}	—	June 29, 2014	Haleakala	Pan-STARRS 1	·	3.1 km	MPC · JPL
517863	2015 RX_{240}	—	August 12, 2015	Haleakala	Pan-STARRS 1	·	2.8 km	MPC · JPL
517864	2015 RZ_{241}	—	February 27, 2012	Kitt Peak	Spacewatch	EOS	1.5 km	MPC · JPL
517865	2015 RZ_{244}	—	September 8, 2015	Haleakala	Pan-STARRS 1	·	3.0 km	MPC · JPL
517866	2015 RR_{253}	—	March 5, 2008	Mount Lemmon	Mount Lemmon Survey	·	1.7 km	MPC · JPL
517867	2015 RS_{253}	—	October 16, 2007	Mount Lemmon	Mount Lemmon Survey	·	860 m	MPC · JPL
517868	2015 RS_{255}	—	May 13, 2009	Mount Lemmon	Mount Lemmon Survey	AGN	1 km	MPC · JPL
517869	2015 RV_{255}	—	September 18, 2011	Mount Lemmon	Mount Lemmon Survey	·	1.1 km	MPC · JPL
517870	2015 RN_{256}	—	March 1, 2012	Mount Lemmon	Mount Lemmon Survey	·	2.1 km	MPC · JPL
517871	2015 RQ_{256}	—	February 24, 2012	Mount Lemmon	Mount Lemmon Survey	EOS	1.5 km	MPC · JPL
517872	2015 RU_{257}	—	March 2, 2008	Mount Lemmon	Mount Lemmon Survey	·	1.6 km	MPC · JPL
517873	2015 RZ_{257}	—	February 2, 2009	Kitt Peak	Spacewatch	·	1.3 km	MPC · JPL
517874	2015 RR_{258}	—	February 28, 2012	Haleakala	Pan-STARRS 1	·	2.8 km	MPC · JPL
517875	2015 RS_{258}	—	September 9, 2015	Haleakala	Pan-STARRS 1	·	2.6 km	MPC · JPL
517876	2015 RT_{258}	—	September 3, 2010	Mount Lemmon	Mount Lemmon Survey	·	1.5 km	MPC · JPL
517877	2015 RC_{259}	—	June 24, 2014	Haleakala	Pan-STARRS 1	·	3.1 km	MPC · JPL
517878	2015 RY_{259}	—	September 27, 2009	Mount Lemmon	Mount Lemmon Survey	·	2.7 km	MPC · JPL
517879	2015 RF_{260}	—	September 9, 2015	Haleakala	Pan-STARRS 1	·	1.6 km	MPC · JPL
517880	2015 RO_{260}	—	December 15, 2006	Kitt Peak	Spacewatch	·	1.5 km	MPC · JPL
517881	2015 SC_{3}	—	March 22, 2014	Mount Lemmon	Mount Lemmon Survey	NYS	1.1 km	MPC · JPL
517882	2015 SE_{3}	—	October 26, 2011	Haleakala	Pan-STARRS 1	(194)	1.6 km	MPC · JPL
517883	2015 SC_{9}	—	February 28, 2014	Haleakala	Pan-STARRS 1	·	1.4 km	MPC · JPL
517884	2015 SM_{17}	—	March 6, 2006	Catalina	CSS	·	5.4 km	MPC · JPL
517885	2015 SJ_{23}	—	March 2, 2009	Mount Lemmon	Mount Lemmon Survey	·	1.5 km	MPC · JPL
517886	2015 ST_{23}	—	March 31, 2008	Mount Lemmon	Mount Lemmon Survey	·	1.8 km	MPC · JPL
517887	2015 SH_{24}	—	November 3, 2011	Kitt Peak	Spacewatch	EUN	1 km	MPC · JPL
517888	2015 SK_{24}	—	October 11, 2007	Mount Lemmon	Mount Lemmon Survey	·	760 m	MPC · JPL
517889	2015 SL_{24}	—	February 26, 2012	Mount Lemmon	Mount Lemmon Survey	·	3.3 km	MPC · JPL
517890	2015 SW_{24}	—	August 5, 2014	Haleakala	Pan-STARRS 1	CYB	2.8 km	MPC · JPL
517891	2015 TS_{22}	—	October 8, 2004	Anderson Mesa	LONEOS	·	3.5 km	MPC · JPL
517892	2015 TG_{45}	—	April 4, 2014	Kitt Peak	Spacewatch	·	1.2 km	MPC · JPL
517893	2015 TF_{67}	—	June 29, 2014	Haleakala	Pan-STARRS 1	EOS	1.9 km	MPC · JPL
517894 Rolfrohwedder	2015 TP_{70}	Rolfrohwedder	August 22, 2014	Haleakala	Pan-STARRS 1	·	2.7 km	MPC · JPL
517895	2015 TJ_{71}	—	July 10, 2005	Kitt Peak	Spacewatch	MRX	1 km	MPC · JPL
517896	2015 TU_{74}	—	October 17, 1998	Kitt Peak	Spacewatch	URS	3.2 km	MPC · JPL
517897	2015 TY_{75}	—	April 25, 2010	WISE	WISE	ADE	1.7 km	MPC · JPL
517898	2015 TX_{77}	—	October 8, 2015	Haleakala	Pan-STARRS 1	·	1.9 km	MPC · JPL
517899	2015 TB_{85}	—	April 11, 2013	Mount Lemmon	Mount Lemmon Survey	·	3.0 km	MPC · JPL
517900	2015 TQ_{90}	—	March 28, 2008	Kitt Peak	Spacewatch	EOS	2.0 km	MPC · JPL

== 517901–518000 ==
back to top

Designation			Discovery			Properties		Ref
Permanent	Provisional	Named after	Date	Site	Discoverer(s)	Category	Diam.	Ref
517901	2015 TD_{96}	—	August 18, 2009	Kitt Peak	Spacewatch	·	2.7 km	MPC · JPL
517902	2015 TE_{101}	—	October 26, 2011	Haleakala	Pan-STARRS 1	·	1.2 km	MPC · JPL
517903	2015 TL_{101}	—	October 26, 2011	Haleakala	Pan-STARRS 1	·	970 m	MPC · JPL
517904	2015 TS_{104}	—	September 3, 2008	Kitt Peak	Spacewatch	CYB	3.2 km	MPC · JPL
517905	2015 TZ_{107}	—	May 16, 2013	Mount Lemmon	Mount Lemmon Survey	·	3.3 km	MPC · JPL
517906	2015 TY_{109}	—	July 25, 2014	Haleakala	Pan-STARRS 1	·	2.3 km	MPC · JPL
517907	2015 TR_{116}	—	April 24, 2007	Mount Lemmon	Mount Lemmon Survey	·	4.0 km	MPC · JPL
517908	2015 TJ_{118}	—	March 16, 2012	Mount Lemmon	Mount Lemmon Survey	·	2.2 km	MPC · JPL
517909	2015 TM_{119}	—	January 2, 2012	Mount Lemmon	Mount Lemmon Survey	EUN	1.4 km	MPC · JPL
517910	2015 TE_{123}	—	June 21, 2010	Mount Lemmon	Mount Lemmon Survey	·	1.2 km	MPC · JPL
517911	2015 TK_{130}	—	October 8, 2015	Haleakala	Pan-STARRS 1	·	1.9 km	MPC · JPL
517912	2015 TZ_{131}	—	April 10, 2010	Kitt Peak	Spacewatch	·	960 m	MPC · JPL
517913	2015 TV_{132}	—	December 4, 2005	Kitt Peak	Spacewatch	EOS	1.7 km	MPC · JPL
517914	2015 TY_{132}	—	February 19, 2012	Kitt Peak	Spacewatch	·	2.8 km	MPC · JPL
517915	2015 TT_{137}	—	December 1, 2005	Kitt Peak	Spacewatch	EOS	1.8 km	MPC · JPL
517916	2015 TH_{141}	—	December 9, 2010	Kitt Peak	Spacewatch	·	2.8 km	MPC · JPL
517917	2015 TM_{144}	—	February 25, 2006	Mount Lemmon	Mount Lemmon Survey	·	1.4 km	MPC · JPL
517918	2015 TO_{148}	—	February 26, 2014	Haleakala	Pan-STARRS 1	NYS	950 m	MPC · JPL
517919	2015 TZ_{152}	—	November 24, 2006	Mount Lemmon	Mount Lemmon Survey	KOR	1.2 km	MPC · JPL
517920	2015 TP_{157}	—	October 8, 2007	Mount Lemmon	Mount Lemmon Survey	·	960 m	MPC · JPL
517921	2015 TS_{167}	—	September 9, 2015	Haleakala	Pan-STARRS 1	EOS	1.8 km	MPC · JPL
517922	2015 TZ_{167}	—	September 8, 2015	Haleakala	Pan-STARRS 1	·	2.0 km	MPC · JPL
517923	2015 TM_{168}	—	March 5, 2013	Mount Lemmon	Mount Lemmon Survey	KOR	1.3 km	MPC · JPL
517924	2015 TE_{170}	—	September 15, 1993	Kitt Peak	Spacewatch	·	2.5 km	MPC · JPL
517925	2015 TV_{170}	—	March 27, 2012	Mount Lemmon	Mount Lemmon Survey	URS	3.1 km	MPC · JPL
517926	2015 TP_{179}	—	May 16, 2005	Mount Lemmon	Mount Lemmon Survey	·	1.9 km	MPC · JPL
517927	2015 TV_{182}	—	March 19, 2013	Haleakala	Pan-STARRS 1	AGN	1.2 km	MPC · JPL
517928	2015 TL_{183}	—	October 23, 2006	Kitt Peak	Spacewatch	·	2.0 km	MPC · JPL
517929	2015 TR_{193}	—	October 23, 2006	Kitt Peak	Spacewatch	·	1.7 km	MPC · JPL
517930	2015 TQ_{197}	—	October 13, 2006	Kitt Peak	Spacewatch	·	2.3 km	MPC · JPL
517931	2015 TX_{210}	—	February 26, 2008	Mount Lemmon	Mount Lemmon Survey	KOR	1.3 km	MPC · JPL
517932	2015 TP_{214}	—	September 25, 2006	Kitt Peak	Spacewatch	AGN	1.1 km	MPC · JPL
517933	2015 TV_{232}	—	September 17, 2006	Kitt Peak	Spacewatch	·	1.9 km	MPC · JPL
517934	2015 TD_{240}	—	July 29, 2010	WISE	WISE	·	3.9 km	MPC · JPL
517935	2015 TT_{242}	—	November 5, 2011	Haleakala	Pan-STARRS 1	EUN	980 m	MPC · JPL
517936	2015 TY_{242}	—	October 2, 2015	Kitt Peak	Spacewatch	HYG	2.8 km	MPC · JPL
517937	2015 TS_{243}	—	June 3, 2014	Haleakala	Pan-STARRS 1	·	3.5 km	MPC · JPL
517938	2015 TM_{259}	—	September 7, 2015	XuYi	PMO NEO Survey Program	·	3.3 km	MPC · JPL
517939	2015 TG_{260}	—	April 28, 2004	Kitt Peak	Spacewatch	·	2.2 km	MPC · JPL
517940	2015 TZ_{276}	—	July 29, 2010	WISE	WISE	·	2.0 km	MPC · JPL
517941	2015 TG_{283}	—	October 24, 2011	Kitt Peak	Spacewatch	·	1.3 km	MPC · JPL
517942	2015 TR_{294}	—	October 24, 2011	Kitt Peak	Spacewatch	·	1.4 km	MPC · JPL
517943	2015 TT_{295}	—	August 27, 2006	Kitt Peak	Spacewatch	·	1.3 km	MPC · JPL
517944	2015 TN_{299}	—	January 11, 2008	Kitt Peak	Spacewatch	AST	1.3 km	MPC · JPL
517945	2015 TF_{303}	—	August 17, 2009	Siding Spring	SSS	·	3.7 km	MPC · JPL
517946	2015 TO_{303}	—	November 8, 2010	Mount Lemmon	Mount Lemmon Survey	·	2.4 km	MPC · JPL
517947	2015 TS_{304}	—	November 5, 2005	Mount Lemmon	Mount Lemmon Survey	·	1.7 km	MPC · JPL
517948	2015 TQ_{305}	—	April 7, 2013	Kitt Peak	Spacewatch	·	2.8 km	MPC · JPL
517949	2015 TD_{308}	—	September 9, 2015	Haleakala	Pan-STARRS 1	·	2.4 km	MPC · JPL
517950	2015 TN_{317}	—	October 27, 2005	Kitt Peak	Spacewatch	·	1.5 km	MPC · JPL
517951	2015 TE_{320}	—	October 15, 2004	Mount Lemmon	Mount Lemmon Survey	THM	2.2 km	MPC · JPL
517952	2015 TM_{323}	—	November 25, 2006	Mount Lemmon	Mount Lemmon Survey	·	1.9 km	MPC · JPL
517953	2015 TA_{324}	—	April 30, 2014	Haleakala	Pan-STARRS 1	·	1.7 km	MPC · JPL
517954	2015 TF_{332}	—	February 3, 2012	Haleakala	Pan-STARRS 1	EOS	1.8 km	MPC · JPL
517955	2015 TY_{344}	—	September 21, 2009	Mount Lemmon	Mount Lemmon Survey	VER	2.0 km	MPC · JPL
517956	2015 TM_{347}	—	August 21, 2015	Haleakala	Pan-STARRS 1	·	1.9 km	MPC · JPL
517957	2015 TT_{358}	—	April 30, 2014	Haleakala	Pan-STARRS 1	KON	1.9 km	MPC · JPL
517958	2015 TO_{359}	—	September 14, 2005	Kitt Peak	Spacewatch	KOR	1.2 km	MPC · JPL
517959	2015 TW_{359}	—	October 10, 2015	Haleakala	Pan-STARRS 1	·	2.8 km	MPC · JPL
517960	2015 TX_{359}	—	October 3, 2006	Mount Lemmon	Mount Lemmon Survey	·	1.5 km	MPC · JPL
517961	2015 TQ_{360}	—	April 30, 2009	Mount Lemmon	Mount Lemmon Survey	·	1.9 km	MPC · JPL
517962	2015 TK_{364}	—	October 11, 1999	Kitt Peak	Spacewatch	·	3.4 km	MPC · JPL
517963	2015 TM_{364}	—	December 13, 2010	Kitt Peak	Spacewatch	·	2.9 km	MPC · JPL
517964	2015 TS_{364}	—	October 9, 2015	Haleakala	Pan-STARRS 1	EOS	1.4 km	MPC · JPL
517965	2015 TY_{364}	—	January 6, 2006	Kitt Peak	Spacewatch	·	2.7 km	MPC · JPL
517966	2015 TC_{365}	—	March 14, 2007	Kitt Peak	Spacewatch	·	2.4 km	MPC · JPL
517967	2015 TY_{365}	—	May 5, 2008	Catalina	CSS	·	2.8 km	MPC · JPL
517968	2015 TT_{366}	—	January 10, 2013	Haleakala	Pan-STARRS 1	(1338) (FLO)	500 m	MPC · JPL
517969	2015 TW_{366}	—	March 27, 2012	Mount Lemmon	Mount Lemmon Survey	URS	2.9 km	MPC · JPL
517970	2015 TX_{366}	—	February 25, 2012	Mount Lemmon	Mount Lemmon Survey	·	1.4 km	MPC · JPL
517971	2015 TZ_{366}	—	September 6, 2008	Mount Lemmon	Mount Lemmon Survey	CYB	3.3 km	MPC · JPL
517972	2015 TO_{367}	—	September 23, 2009	Mount Lemmon	Mount Lemmon Survey	EOS	1.5 km	MPC · JPL
517973	2015 TY_{367}	—	January 17, 2013	Haleakala	Pan-STARRS 1	EOS	2.3 km	MPC · JPL
517974	2015 TC_{368}	—	June 24, 2014	Haleakala	Pan-STARRS 1	EUN	1.1 km	MPC · JPL
517975	2015 TH_{368}	—	April 8, 2013	Mount Lemmon	Mount Lemmon Survey	·	3.5 km	MPC · JPL
517976	2015 TT_{368}	—	March 30, 2012	Mount Lemmon	Mount Lemmon Survey	·	2.9 km	MPC · JPL
517977	2015 UD_{1}	—	March 20, 2007	Kitt Peak	Spacewatch	VER	2.7 km	MPC · JPL
517978	2015 UQ_{2}	—	March 2, 2009	Kitt Peak	Spacewatch	·	1.3 km	MPC · JPL
517979	2015 UP_{3}	—	November 24, 2011	Mount Lemmon	Mount Lemmon Survey	·	1.6 km	MPC · JPL
517980	2015 UW_{5}	—	September 18, 2010	Mount Lemmon	Mount Lemmon Survey	·	2.5 km	MPC · JPL
517981	2015 UL_{7}	—	January 28, 2000	Kitt Peak	Spacewatch	TIR	3.1 km	MPC · JPL
517982	2015 UD_{20}	—	October 1, 2006	Kitt Peak	Spacewatch	·	1.6 km	MPC · JPL
517983	2015 UH_{20}	—	September 28, 2006	Kitt Peak	Spacewatch	NEM	1.9 km	MPC · JPL
517984	2015 UL_{21}	—	March 16, 2007	Kitt Peak	Spacewatch	·	3.1 km	MPC · JPL
517985	2015 UN_{21}	—	January 26, 1998	Kitt Peak	Spacewatch	KOR	1.5 km	MPC · JPL
517986	2015 UV_{21}	—	June 3, 2010	WISE	WISE	PHO	1.7 km	MPC · JPL
517987	2015 UQ_{24}	—	March 19, 2009	Kitt Peak	Spacewatch	·	1.8 km	MPC · JPL
517988	2015 UD_{31}	—	March 10, 2007	Mount Lemmon	Mount Lemmon Survey	·	2.6 km	MPC · JPL
517989	2015 UY_{32}	—	October 18, 2015	Haleakala	Pan-STARRS 1	THM	2.1 km	MPC · JPL
517990	2015 UB_{36}	—	February 17, 2013	Mount Lemmon	Mount Lemmon Survey	·	1.9 km	MPC · JPL
517991	2015 UE_{39}	—	May 4, 2014	Haleakala	Pan-STARRS 1	·	1.3 km	MPC · JPL
517992	2015 UX_{44}	—	March 16, 2012	Mount Lemmon	Mount Lemmon Survey	(43176)	2.5 km	MPC · JPL
517993	2015 UQ_{49}	—	February 25, 2007	Mount Lemmon	Mount Lemmon Survey	·	2.6 km	MPC · JPL
517994	2015 UA_{50}	—	December 6, 2010	Mount Lemmon	Mount Lemmon Survey	EOS	1.6 km	MPC · JPL
517995	2015 UY_{53}	—	April 6, 1995	Kitt Peak	Spacewatch	·	1.8 km	MPC · JPL
517996	2015 UG_{55}	—	April 18, 2007	Mount Lemmon	Mount Lemmon Survey	·	2.2 km	MPC · JPL
517997	2015 UQ_{57}	—	August 20, 2014	Haleakala	Pan-STARRS 1	·	2.7 km	MPC · JPL
517998	2015 UL_{73}	—	October 31, 2006	Mount Lemmon	Mount Lemmon Survey	HOF	2.2 km	MPC · JPL
517999	2015 UD_{79}	—	December 22, 2005	Catalina	CSS	·	3.5 km	MPC · JPL
518000	2015 UK_{86}	—	October 1, 2005	Mount Lemmon	Mount Lemmon Survey	·	1.8 km	MPC · JPL

back to top

== Meaning of names ==
As minor planet discoveries are confirmed, they are given a permanent number by the IAU's Minor Planet Center (MPC), and the discoverers can then submit names for them, following the IAU's naming conventions. The list below concerns those minor planets in the specified number-range that have received names, and explains the meanings of those names.

Official naming citations of newly named small Solar System bodies are approved and published in a bulletin by IAU's Working Group for Small Bodies Nomenclature (WGSBN). Before May 2021, citations were published in MPC's Minor Planet Circulars for many decades. Recent citations can also be found on the JPL Small-Body Database (SBDB). Until his death in 2016, German astronomer Lutz D. Schmadel compiled these citations into the Dictionary of Minor Planet Names (DMP) and regularly updated the collection.

Based on Paul Herget's The Names of the Minor Planets, Schmadel also researched the unclear origin of numerous asteroids, most of which had been named prior to World War II. This article incorporates text from this source, which is in the public domain: SBDB New namings may only be added to this list below after official publication as the preannouncement of names is condemned. The WGSBN publishes a comprehensive guideline for the naming rules of non-cometary small Solar System bodies.

Named minor planet	Provisional	This minor planet was named for...	Ref · Catalog
517104 Redinger	2013 EO_{53}	Larry Redinger (b. 1945) is a retired Dean of Mt. San Antonio College, a public community college in Walnut, California.	IAU · 517104
517894 Rolfrohwedder	2015 TP_{70}	Rolf Rohwedder (1928–2022), Argentine physician, medical scientist, and inventor.	IAU · 517894
