= (517103) 2013 EM20 =

Apollo near-Earth asteroid

(517103) 2013 EM_{20}
Discovery
- Discovered by: Mt. Lemmon Survey
- Discovery date: 12 January 2008

Designations
- Designation: (517103) 2013 EM_{20}
- Alternative names: 2008 AO_{112}
- Minor planet category: NEO; Apollo; PHA

Orbital characteristics
- Epoch 9 June 2026 (JD 2461200.5)
- Uncertainty parameter 0
- Aphelion: 1.8072 AU (Q)
- Perihelion: 0.93531 AU (q)
- Semi-major axis: 1.3713 AU (a)
- Eccentricity: 0.31793
- Orbital period (sidereal): 1.6058 yr (586.53 d)
- Mean anomaly: 165.45° (M)
- Inclination: 8.3634°
- Longitude of ascending node: 73.879°
- Argument of perihelion: 350.17°
- Earth MOID: 0.04314 AU
- T_{Jupiter}: 4.758

Physical characteristics
- Dimensions: ~310 meters (1,020 ft)
- Mass: 4.1×10^{10} kg (assumed)
- Absolute magnitude (H): 19.9

(517103) 2013 EM_{20} (also designated 2008 AO_{112}) is an Apollo near-Earth asteroid and potentially hazardous object. It was discovered on 12 January 2008 by the Mount Lemmon Survey at an apparent magnitude of 21 using a 1.5-meter (59 in) reflecting telescope. The asteroid was quickly lost and had an estimated diameter of 310 meters (1,020 ft). On 25 June 2009, with an observation arc of only 1 day in January 2008, the asteroid had a 1 in 4 million chance of impacting Earth on that very day. The virtual impactor had not been eliminated from the Sentry Risk Table by the day of the potential impact.

The asteroid was recovered on 5 March 2013 as 2013 EM_{20}. Precovery images from 7 April 1997 at Kitt Peak National Observatory were located. It was removed from the Sentry Risk Table on 30 March 2013. It is now known that on 25 June 2009 the asteroid was 1.45 AU from Earth.
