= Mount Lemmon Survey =

Part of the Catalina Sky Survey

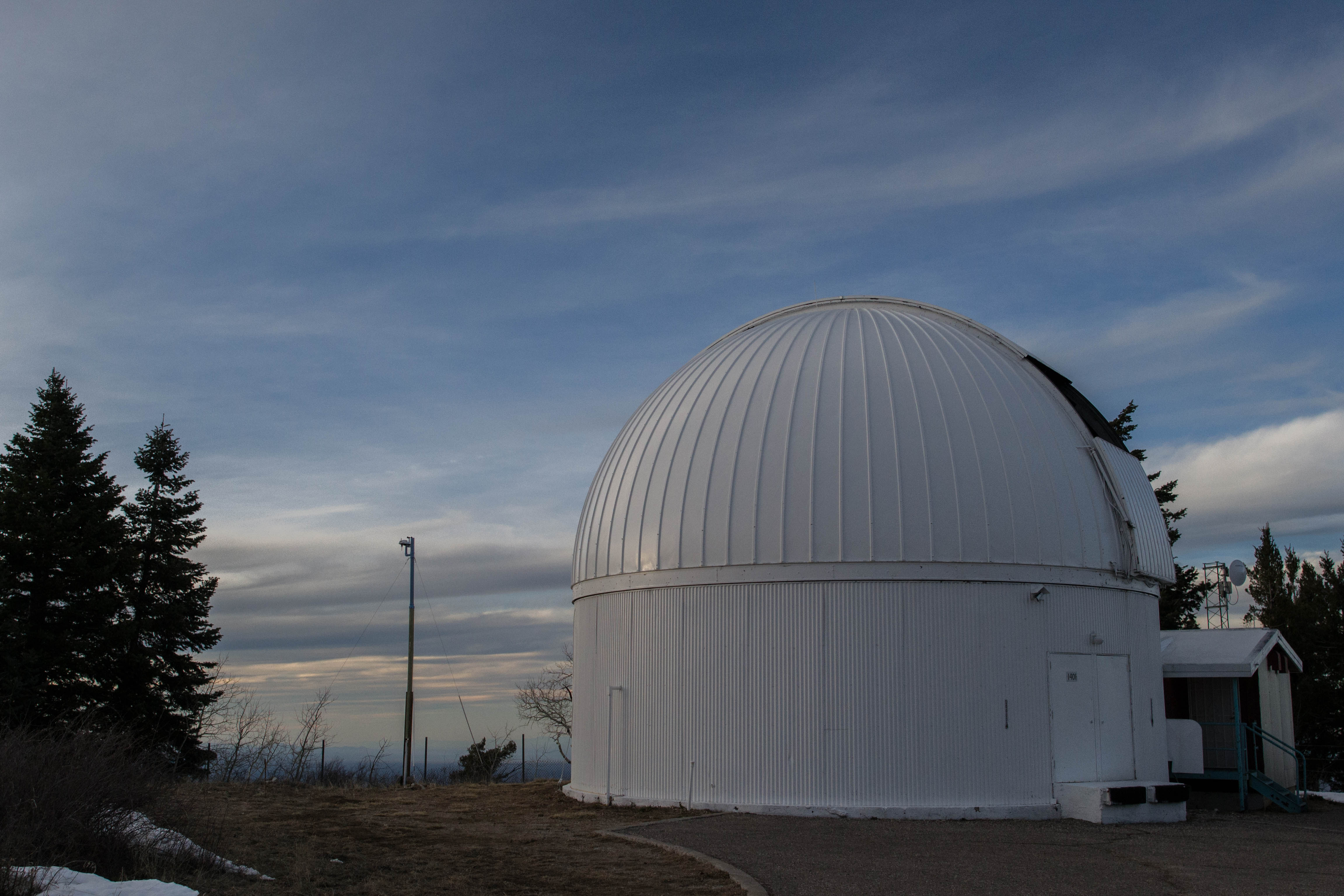
- Alternative names: MLS
- Coordinates: 32°26′34″N 110°47′19″W
- Observatory code: G96

Minor planets discovered: 173,520
see List of minor planets § Main index

Mount Lemmon Survey (MLS) is a part of the Catalina Sky Survey with observatory code G96. MLS uses a 1.52 m (60 in) cassegrain reflector telescope (with 10560x10560-pixel camera at the f/1.6 prime focus, for a five square degree field of view) operated by the Steward Observatory at Mount Lemmon Observatory, which is located at 2,791 meters (9,157 ft) in the Santa Catalina Mountains northeast of Tucson, Arizona.

It is currently one of the most prolific surveys worldwide, especially for discovering near-Earth objects. MLS ranks among the top discoverers on the Minor Planet Center's discovery chart with a total of more than 170,000 numbered minor planets.

== History ==
Andrea Boattini and the survey accidentally rediscovered 206P/Barnard-Boattini, a lost comet, on 7 October 2008. The comet has made 20 revolutions since 1892 and passed within 0.3–0.4 AU of Jupiter in 1922, 1934 and 2005. This comet was also the first comet to be discovered by photographic means, by the American astronomer Edward Emerson Barnard, who did so on the night of 13 October 1892.

On 12 January 2008, Mount Lemmon Survey discovered the near-Earth asteroid 2008 AO112 at an apparent magnitude of 21 using a 1.5-meter (59 in) reflecting telescope.

2011 UN63 was discovered by the Mount Lemmon Survey on 27 September 2009 and it is a stable L_{5} Mars trojan asteroid. The survey also discovered the unusual Aten asteroid 2012 FC71, a dynamically cold Kozai resonator, on 31 March 2012.

== See also ==
- List of astronomical observatories
- List of minor planet discoverers § Discovering dedicated institutions
- Mount Lemmon
