= List of minor planets: 583001–584000 =

The following is a partial list of minor planets, running from minor-planet number 583001 through 584000, inclusive. The primary data for this and other partial lists is based on JPL's "Small-Body Orbital Elements" and data available from the Minor Planet Center. Critical list information is also provided by the MPC, unless otherwise specified from Lowell Observatory. A detailed description of the table's columns and additional sources are given on the main page including a complete list of every page in this series, and a statistical break-up on the dynamical classification of minor planets.

Also see the summary list of all named bodies in numerical and alphabetical order, and the corresponding naming citations for the number range of this particular list. New namings may only be added to this list after official publication, as the preannouncement of names is condemned by the Working Group for Small Bodies Nomenclature of the International Astronomical Union.

Near-Earth obj.	MBA (inner)	MBA (outer)	Centaur
Mars-crosser	MBA (middle)	Jupiter trojan	Trans-Neptunian obj.
Unclassified

== 583001–583100 ==
Designation			Discovery			Properties		Ref
Permanent	Provisional	Named after	Date	Site	Discoverer(s)	Category	Diam.	Ref
583001	2016 CE_{335}	—	February 14, 1999	Caussols	ODAS	·	1.6 km	MPC · JPL
583002	2016 CK_{340}	—	February 12, 2016	Haleakala	Pan-STARRS 1	·	1.5 km	MPC · JPL
583003	2016 CN_{340}	—	February 6, 2016	Haleakala	Pan-STARRS 1	·	970 m	MPC · JPL
583004	2016 CD_{342}	—	February 10, 2016	Haleakala	Pan-STARRS 1	EUN	900 m	MPC · JPL
583005	2016 CX_{343}	—	February 6, 2016	Mount Lemmon	Mount Lemmon Survey	·	1.0 km	MPC · JPL
583006	2016 CJ_{346}	—	February 3, 2016	Mount Lemmon	Mount Lemmon Survey	V	550 m	MPC · JPL
583007	2016 CA_{347}	—	February 11, 2016	Haleakala	Pan-STARRS 1	PHO	900 m	MPC · JPL
583008	2016 CJ_{347}	—	February 14, 2016	Haleakala	Pan-STARRS 1	·	1.3 km	MPC · JPL
583009	2016 CC_{349}	—	February 10, 2016	Haleakala	Pan-STARRS 1	·	1.4 km	MPC · JPL
583010	2016 DW_{2}	—	July 16, 2013	Haleakala	Pan-STARRS 1	·	1.5 km	MPC · JPL
583011	2016 DK_{3}	—	February 26, 2012	Haleakala	Pan-STARRS 1	·	910 m	MPC · JPL
583012	2016 DJ_{7}	—	October 8, 2007	Mount Lemmon	Mount Lemmon Survey	·	830 m	MPC · JPL
583013	2016 DN_{7}	—	December 30, 2011	Mount Lemmon	Mount Lemmon Survey	·	960 m	MPC · JPL
583014	2016 DP_{7}	—	October 12, 2007	Kitt Peak	Spacewatch	MAS	580 m	MPC · JPL
583015	2016 DH_{8}	—	March 15, 2004	Kitt Peak	Spacewatch	·	890 m	MPC · JPL
583016	2016 DL_{10}	—	October 17, 2010	Mount Lemmon	Mount Lemmon Survey	NYS	1.2 km	MPC · JPL
583017	2016 DA_{12}	—	July 14, 2013	Haleakala	Pan-STARRS 1	·	1.4 km	MPC · JPL
583018	2016 DX_{12}	—	February 27, 2012	Kitt Peak	Spacewatch	·	1.4 km	MPC · JPL
583019	2016 DH_{19}	—	August 15, 2013	Haleakala	Pan-STARRS 1	·	1.2 km	MPC · JPL
583020	2016 DA_{22}	—	September 16, 2003	Kitt Peak	Spacewatch	·	1.5 km	MPC · JPL
583021	2016 DB_{23}	—	February 6, 1999	Mauna Kea	Veillet, C., Anderson, J.	·	970 m	MPC · JPL
583022	2016 DD_{23}	—	August 15, 2004	Cerro Tololo	Deep Ecliptic Survey	·	1.2 km	MPC · JPL
583023	2016 DG_{24}	—	April 27, 2009	Mount Lemmon	Mount Lemmon Survey	NYS	920 m	MPC · JPL
583024	2016 DO_{26}	—	March 15, 2008	Mount Lemmon	Mount Lemmon Survey	·	1.2 km	MPC · JPL
583025	2016 DP_{26}	—	February 4, 2012	Haleakala	Pan-STARRS 1	·	1.4 km	MPC · JPL
583026	2016 DA_{29}	—	March 11, 2005	Mount Lemmon	Mount Lemmon Survey	·	900 m	MPC · JPL
583027	2016 DD_{29}	—	February 29, 2016	Haleakala	Pan-STARRS 1	·	1.6 km	MPC · JPL
583028	2016 DL_{30}	—	February 1, 1995	Kitt Peak	Spacewatch	·	900 m	MPC · JPL
583029	2016 DF_{33}	—	April 13, 2001	Kitt Peak	Spacewatch	V	620 m	MPC · JPL
583030	2016 DY_{35}	—	February 29, 2016	Haleakala	Pan-STARRS 1	·	1.1 km	MPC · JPL
583031	2016 EQ_{7}	—	October 26, 2009	Mount Lemmon	Mount Lemmon Survey	·	1.5 km	MPC · JPL
583032	2016 EG_{8}	—	May 22, 2012	ESA OGS	ESA OGS	·	1.4 km	MPC · JPL
583033	2016 EX_{8}	—	January 11, 2008	Mount Lemmon	Mount Lemmon Survey	·	1.2 km	MPC · JPL
583034	2016 EP_{12}	—	January 16, 2011	Mount Lemmon	Mount Lemmon Survey	·	1.7 km	MPC · JPL
583035	2016 ER_{14}	—	February 4, 2016	Haleakala	Pan-STARRS 1	EUN	1.0 km	MPC · JPL
583036	2016 ET_{15}	—	July 26, 2005	Palomar	NEAT	MAR	1.1 km	MPC · JPL
583037	2016 EC_{17}	—	December 14, 2010	Mount Lemmon	Mount Lemmon Survey	·	1.4 km	MPC · JPL
583038	2016 EU_{19}	—	September 17, 2014	Haleakala	Pan-STARRS 1	JUN	890 m	MPC · JPL
583039	2016 EW_{22}	—	January 16, 2016	Haleakala	Pan-STARRS 1	JUN	870 m	MPC · JPL
583040	2016 EP_{24}	—	February 12, 2016	Haleakala	Pan-STARRS 1	·	1.5 km	MPC · JPL
583041	2016 EG_{25}	—	July 14, 2013	Haleakala	Pan-STARRS 1	·	1.0 km	MPC · JPL
583042	2016 EJ_{25}	—	December 26, 2014	Haleakala	Pan-STARRS 1	·	1.4 km	MPC · JPL
583043	2016 EO_{25}	—	June 30, 2008	Kitt Peak	Spacewatch	·	1.6 km	MPC · JPL
583044	2016 ES_{26}	—	March 3, 2016	Haleakala	Pan-STARRS 1	·	1.4 km	MPC · JPL
583045	2016 EX_{26}	—	November 17, 2014	Haleakala	Pan-STARRS 1	MAR	1.0 km	MPC · JPL
583046	2016 EH_{29}	—	April 17, 2009	Kitt Peak	Spacewatch	·	1.1 km	MPC · JPL
583047	2016 EJ_{29}	—	February 4, 2016	Haleakala	Pan-STARRS 1	·	1.1 km	MPC · JPL
583048	2016 EN_{29}	—	September 20, 2003	Palomar	NEAT	V	600 m	MPC · JPL
583049	2016 EQ_{34}	—	July 28, 2005	Palomar	NEAT	MAR	1.6 km	MPC · JPL
583050	2016 EU_{35}	—	December 2, 2005	Mount Lemmon	Mount Lemmon Survey	·	2.4 km	MPC · JPL
583051	2016 EC_{36}	—	November 17, 2011	Kitt Peak	Spacewatch	·	850 m	MPC · JPL
583052	2016 EL_{36}	—	February 8, 2007	Mount Lemmon	Mount Lemmon Survey	EUN	910 m	MPC · JPL
583053	2016 EG_{37}	—	August 10, 2013	Palomar	Palomar Transient Factory	·	1.8 km	MPC · JPL
583054	2016 EU_{37}	—	January 14, 2011	Mount Lemmon	Mount Lemmon Survey	·	1.6 km	MPC · JPL
583055	2016 ER_{40}	—	August 1, 2009	Kitt Peak	Spacewatch	BRG	1.5 km	MPC · JPL
583056	2016 EM_{42}	—	December 9, 2015	Haleakala	Pan-STARRS 1	KON	2.1 km	MPC · JPL
583057	2016 EZ_{42}	—	December 12, 2015	Haleakala	Pan-STARRS 1	·	1.3 km	MPC · JPL
583058	2016 EM_{46}	—	November 3, 2010	Kitt Peak	Spacewatch	EUN	900 m	MPC · JPL
583059	2016 EO_{57}	—	January 4, 2016	Haleakala	Pan-STARRS 1	MIS	2.0 km	MPC · JPL
583060	2016 EG_{58}	—	September 26, 2002	Palomar	NEAT	·	1.1 km	MPC · JPL
583061	2016 EV_{60}	—	March 14, 2013	Kitt Peak	Spacewatch	·	530 m	MPC · JPL
583062	2016 ED_{61}	—	April 12, 2008	Kitt Peak	Spacewatch	·	790 m	MPC · JPL
583063	2016 EU_{61}	—	January 20, 2015	Haleakala	Pan-STARRS 1	·	1.5 km	MPC · JPL
583064	2016 EX_{61}	—	March 4, 2016	Haleakala	Pan-STARRS 1	·	2.3 km	MPC · JPL
583065	2016 EF_{62}	—	June 6, 2008	Kitt Peak	Spacewatch	·	1.6 km	MPC · JPL
583066	2016 ET_{64}	—	March 4, 2016	Haleakala	Pan-STARRS 1	·	1.3 km	MPC · JPL
583067	2016 EH_{65}	—	September 1, 2013	Haleakala	Pan-STARRS 1	·	1.5 km	MPC · JPL
583068	2016 EZ_{67}	—	January 12, 2016	Haleakala	Pan-STARRS 1	·	940 m	MPC · JPL
583069	2016 EG_{68}	—	September 10, 2010	Kitt Peak	Spacewatch	·	1.1 km	MPC · JPL
583070	2016 EG_{70}	—	February 13, 2011	Mount Lemmon	Mount Lemmon Survey	·	1.9 km	MPC · JPL
583071	2016 EQ_{70}	—	March 28, 2012	Mount Lemmon	Mount Lemmon Survey	·	1.1 km	MPC · JPL
583072	2016 EA_{71}	—	February 24, 1995	Kitt Peak	Spacewatch	MAR	880 m	MPC · JPL
583073	2016 EB_{71}	—	August 14, 2013	Haleakala	Pan-STARRS 1	·	1.2 km	MPC · JPL
583074	2016 ED_{72}	—	March 5, 2016	Haleakala	Pan-STARRS 1	·	1.8 km	MPC · JPL
583075	2016 EH_{73}	—	February 3, 2012	Mount Lemmon	Mount Lemmon Survey	·	1.0 km	MPC · JPL
583076	2016 EB_{77}	—	October 2, 2014	Kitt Peak	Spacewatch	·	1.4 km	MPC · JPL
583077	2016 EW_{77}	—	April 29, 2009	Mount Lemmon	Mount Lemmon Survey	NYS	1.2 km	MPC · JPL
583078	2016 EH_{78}	—	August 12, 2013	Haleakala	Pan-STARRS 1	·	1.0 km	MPC · JPL
583079	2016 ET_{79}	—	March 22, 2012	Mayhill-ISON	L. Elenin	·	1.1 km	MPC · JPL
583080	2016 EC_{83}	—	January 9, 2016	Haleakala	Pan-STARRS 1	MAR	1.1 km	MPC · JPL
583081	2016 EF_{87}	—	March 6, 2008	Mount Lemmon	Mount Lemmon Survey	·	960 m	MPC · JPL
583082	2016 EG_{88}	—	April 8, 2003	Palomar	NEAT	·	1.4 km	MPC · JPL
583083	2016 ED_{90}	—	May 18, 2012	Mount Lemmon	Mount Lemmon Survey	·	1.1 km	MPC · JPL
583084	2016 EJ_{92}	—	September 26, 2006	Kitt Peak	Spacewatch	PHO	800 m	MPC · JPL
583085	2016 EF_{94}	—	October 15, 2002	Palomar	NEAT	·	1.1 km	MPC · JPL
583086	2016 EE_{95}	—	March 27, 2012	Mount Lemmon	Mount Lemmon Survey	·	1.2 km	MPC · JPL
583087	2016 EF_{95}	—	March 29, 2008	Mount Lemmon	Mount Lemmon Survey	BRG	1.0 km	MPC · JPL
583088	2016 ER_{100}	—	April 21, 2013	Mount Lemmon	Mount Lemmon Survey	·	650 m	MPC · JPL
583089	2016 EH_{105}	—	November 20, 2003	Kitt Peak	Spacewatch	PHO	820 m	MPC · JPL
583090	2016 EL_{109}	—	January 3, 2012	Kitt Peak	Spacewatch	·	1.1 km	MPC · JPL
583091	2016 EL_{112}	—	November 22, 2014	Haleakala	Pan-STARRS 1	EUN	980 m	MPC · JPL
583092	2016 EZ_{112}	—	January 28, 2007	Mount Lemmon	Mount Lemmon Survey	·	1.3 km	MPC · JPL
583093	2016 EV_{114}	—	December 29, 1999	Mauna Kea	Veillet, C.	·	1.0 km	MPC · JPL
583094	2016 EA_{115}	—	February 25, 2007	Kitt Peak	Spacewatch	MRX	850 m	MPC · JPL
583095	2016 EH_{115}	—	January 27, 2012	Mount Lemmon	Mount Lemmon Survey	·	1.0 km	MPC · JPL
583096	2016 EQ_{116}	—	December 6, 2011	Haleakala	Pan-STARRS 1	NYS	640 m	MPC · JPL
583097	2016 EW_{117}	—	July 14, 2013	Haleakala	Pan-STARRS 1	·	1.2 km	MPC · JPL
583098	2016 EA_{118}	—	February 13, 2004	Kitt Peak	Spacewatch	·	920 m	MPC · JPL
583099	2016 EG_{118}	—	October 9, 2007	Mount Lemmon	Mount Lemmon Survey	NYS	940 m	MPC · JPL
583100	2016 EN_{118}	—	February 24, 2012	Mount Lemmon	Mount Lemmon Survey	·	1.2 km	MPC · JPL

== 583101–583200 ==
back to top

Designation			Discovery			Properties		Ref
Permanent	Provisional	Named after	Date	Site	Discoverer(s)	Category	Diam.	Ref
583101	2016 EB_{119}	—	July 3, 2005	Apache Point	SDSS Collaboration	·	1.0 km	MPC · JPL
583102	2016 EC_{119}	—	September 20, 2014	Haleakala	Pan-STARRS 1	·	970 m	MPC · JPL
583103	2016 EH_{119}	—	March 1, 2016	Mount Lemmon	Mount Lemmon Survey	V	570 m	MPC · JPL
583104	2016 EF_{120}	—	January 19, 2012	Haleakala	Pan-STARRS 1	·	1 km	MPC · JPL
583105	2016 EE_{121}	—	May 30, 2012	Mount Lemmon	Mount Lemmon Survey	·	1.4 km	MPC · JPL
583106	2016 EQ_{121}	—	May 15, 2012	Haleakala	Pan-STARRS 1	·	1.7 km	MPC · JPL
583107	2016 ES_{121}	—	January 13, 2016	Haleakala	Pan-STARRS 1	·	1.2 km	MPC · JPL
583108	2016 EM_{123}	—	January 19, 2012	Haleakala	Pan-STARRS 1	·	840 m	MPC · JPL
583109	2016 EG_{124}	—	February 25, 2012	Mount Lemmon	Mount Lemmon Survey	·	1.0 km	MPC · JPL
583110	2016 EJ_{125}	—	January 18, 2016	Haleakala	Pan-STARRS 1	·	1.1 km	MPC · JPL
583111	2016 EE_{126}	—	July 14, 2013	Haleakala	Pan-STARRS 1	·	1.3 km	MPC · JPL
583112	2016 EE_{127}	—	November 6, 2005	Kitt Peak	Spacewatch	·	1.3 km	MPC · JPL
583113	2016 EO_{132}	—	October 17, 2010	Mount Lemmon	Mount Lemmon Survey	·	770 m	MPC · JPL
583114	2016 EV_{132}	—	July 27, 2009	Kitt Peak	Spacewatch	·	1.0 km	MPC · JPL
583115	2016 EB_{134}	—	December 30, 2014	Mount Lemmon	Mount Lemmon Survey	PHO	820 m	MPC · JPL
583116	2016 ED_{134}	—	October 1, 2013	Mount Lemmon	Mount Lemmon Survey	·	1.0 km	MPC · JPL
583117	2016 ER_{134}	—	April 27, 2012	Haleakala	Pan-STARRS 1	MAR	700 m	MPC · JPL
583118	2016 EJ_{135}	—	October 1, 2005	Mount Lemmon	Mount Lemmon Survey	·	1.4 km	MPC · JPL
583119	2016 EM_{136}	—	September 29, 2009	Kitt Peak	Spacewatch	·	1.5 km	MPC · JPL
583120	2016 EH_{137}	—	March 15, 2007	Kitt Peak	Spacewatch	·	1.5 km	MPC · JPL
583121	2016 ER_{137}	—	October 24, 2009	Kitt Peak	Spacewatch	·	1.4 km	MPC · JPL
583122	2016 EX_{137}	—	March 10, 2016	Haleakala	Pan-STARRS 1	·	1.3 km	MPC · JPL
583123	2016 EL_{138}	—	November 19, 2003	Kitt Peak	Spacewatch	MAS	590 m	MPC · JPL
583124	2016 ES_{138}	—	March 2, 2016	Haleakala	Pan-STARRS 1	MIS	2.0 km	MPC · JPL
583125	2016 EK_{139}	—	October 5, 2013	Mount Lemmon	Mount Lemmon Survey	JUN	890 m	MPC · JPL
583126	2016 EL_{141}	—	October 29, 1994	Kitt Peak	Spacewatch	·	1.4 km	MPC · JPL
583127	2016 EP_{143}	—	March 2, 2009	Mount Lemmon	Mount Lemmon Survey	·	880 m	MPC · JPL
583128	2016 EQ_{143}	—	October 28, 2014	Haleakala	Pan-STARRS 1	ADE	1.4 km	MPC · JPL
583129	2016 ES_{144}	—	February 3, 2012	Haleakala	Pan-STARRS 1	·	790 m	MPC · JPL
583130	2016 EV_{144}	—	March 11, 2003	Palomar	NEAT	·	4.0 km	MPC · JPL
583131	2016 EM_{145}	—	January 25, 2007	Kitt Peak	Spacewatch	·	1.1 km	MPC · JPL
583132	2016 ER_{145}	—	March 27, 2008	Kitt Peak	Spacewatch	·	1.3 km	MPC · JPL
583133	2016 EA_{146}	—	July 14, 2013	Haleakala	Pan-STARRS 1	·	840 m	MPC · JPL
583134	2016 EL_{146}	—	March 4, 2008	Mount Lemmon	Mount Lemmon Survey	·	1.0 km	MPC · JPL
583135	2016 EO_{147}	—	March 11, 2007	Kitt Peak	Spacewatch	·	1.5 km	MPC · JPL
583136	2016 EV_{148}	—	April 4, 2008	Kitt Peak	Spacewatch	·	960 m	MPC · JPL
583137	2016 EA_{149}	—	August 14, 2013	Haleakala	Pan-STARRS 1	·	1.3 km	MPC · JPL
583138	2016 ER_{151}	—	March 23, 2006	Mount Lemmon	Mount Lemmon Survey	·	590 m	MPC · JPL
583139	2016 ET_{152}	—	March 11, 2003	Palomar	NEAT	·	1.4 km	MPC · JPL
583140	2016 EK_{155}	—	March 15, 2012	Kitt Peak	Spacewatch	·	1.1 km	MPC · JPL
583141	2016 EZ_{158}	—	April 21, 2006	Kitt Peak	Spacewatch	·	660 m	MPC · JPL
583142	2016 EN_{160}	—	November 22, 2014	Haleakala	Pan-STARRS 1	·	1.0 km	MPC · JPL
583143	2016 EA_{162}	—	October 25, 2014	Kitt Peak	Spacewatch	·	1.2 km	MPC · JPL
583144	2016 EB_{162}	—	January 6, 2012	Haleakala	Pan-STARRS 1	·	1.5 km	MPC · JPL
583145	2016 EW_{165}	—	November 17, 2014	Haleakala	Pan-STARRS 1	·	1.5 km	MPC · JPL
583146	2016 EU_{166}	—	May 27, 2009	Mount Lemmon	Mount Lemmon Survey	NYS	840 m	MPC · JPL
583147	2016 EE_{167}	—	March 11, 2016	Haleakala	Pan-STARRS 1	·	920 m	MPC · JPL
583148	2016 EU_{168}	—	October 4, 2006	Mount Lemmon	Mount Lemmon Survey	·	1.2 km	MPC · JPL
583149	2016 EQ_{172}	—	April 1, 2003	Apache Point	SDSS Collaboration	·	1.1 km	MPC · JPL
583150	2016 ET_{172}	—	March 9, 2007	Goodricke-Pigott	R. A. Tucker	·	1.9 km	MPC · JPL
583151	2016 EX_{172}	—	October 1, 2005	Kitt Peak	Spacewatch	·	1.6 km	MPC · JPL
583152	2016 EB_{178}	—	May 12, 2012	Mount Lemmon	Mount Lemmon Survey	·	1 km	MPC · JPL
583153	2016 EC_{178}	—	April 25, 2003	Kitt Peak	Spacewatch	WIT	870 m	MPC · JPL
583154	2016 ES_{181}	—	September 9, 2013	Haleakala	Pan-STARRS 1	RAF	840 m	MPC · JPL
583155	2016 EC_{184}	—	May 2, 2003	Socorro	LINEAR	·	2.0 km	MPC · JPL
583156	2016 EU_{188}	—	March 16, 2012	Haleakala	Pan-STARRS 1	MAR	880 m	MPC · JPL
583157	2016 EH_{189}	—	July 14, 2013	Haleakala	Pan-STARRS 1	MAR	810 m	MPC · JPL
583158	2016 EX_{189}	—	August 1, 2013	Haleakala	Pan-STARRS 1	KON	2.0 km	MPC · JPL
583159	2016 EO_{193}	—	April 3, 2008	Mount Lemmon	Mount Lemmon Survey	·	1.9 km	MPC · JPL
583160	2016 ES_{194}	—	October 26, 2005	Kitt Peak	Spacewatch	·	1.5 km	MPC · JPL
583161	2016 EV_{196}	—	April 26, 2003	Socorro	LINEAR	·	1.8 km	MPC · JPL
583162	2016 EO_{197}	—	October 25, 2013	Haleakala	Pan-STARRS 1	ADE	1.9 km	MPC · JPL
583163	2016 EM_{199}	—	September 23, 2013	Mount Lemmon	Mount Lemmon Survey	·	1.6 km	MPC · JPL
583164	2016 EF_{200}	—	June 12, 2008	Kitt Peak	Spacewatch	·	1.8 km	MPC · JPL
583165	2016 EQ_{200}	—	March 25, 2007	Mount Lemmon	Mount Lemmon Survey	·	1.4 km	MPC · JPL
583166	2016 ES_{200}	—	December 29, 2014	Haleakala	Pan-STARRS 1	·	1.7 km	MPC · JPL
583167	2016 EB_{201}	—	March 31, 2008	Mount Lemmon	Mount Lemmon Survey	·	1.0 km	MPC · JPL
583168	2016 EP_{202}	—	March 16, 2012	Haleakala	Pan-STARRS 1	·	1.1 km	MPC · JPL
583169	2016 EY_{202}	—	October 2, 1994	Kitt Peak	Spacewatch	·	1.1 km	MPC · JPL
583170	2016 EB_{203}	—	December 15, 2014	Mount Lemmon	Mount Lemmon Survey	·	1.3 km	MPC · JPL
583171	2016 EW_{205}	—	March 10, 2016	Haleakala	Pan-STARRS 1	H	370 m	MPC · JPL
583172	2016 ES_{207}	—	May 12, 2012	Mount Lemmon	Mount Lemmon Survey	·	1.2 km	MPC · JPL
583173	2016 EG_{209}	—	September 14, 2013	Mount Lemmon	Mount Lemmon Survey	·	1.5 km	MPC · JPL
583174	2016 EJ_{209}	—	March 4, 2016	Haleakala	Pan-STARRS 1	·	930 m	MPC · JPL
583175	2016 EE_{213}	—	April 20, 2012	Mount Lemmon	Mount Lemmon Survey	·	880 m	MPC · JPL
583176	2016 EK_{215}	—	August 28, 2003	Palomar	NEAT	·	1.8 km	MPC · JPL
583177	2016 EE_{217}	—	September 1, 2013	Haleakala	Pan-STARRS 1	EUN	840 m	MPC · JPL
583178	2016 EM_{217}	—	March 11, 2016	Mount Lemmon	Mount Lemmon Survey	·	1.1 km	MPC · JPL
583179	2016 EU_{217}	—	January 26, 2006	Mount Lemmon	Mount Lemmon Survey	·	1.3 km	MPC · JPL
583180	2016 EY_{218}	—	April 17, 2012	Kitt Peak	Spacewatch	·	1.3 km	MPC · JPL
583181	2016 EA_{219}	—	March 7, 2016	Haleakala	Pan-STARRS 1	MAR	920 m	MPC · JPL
583182	2016 EX_{219}	—	September 15, 2009	Kitt Peak	Spacewatch	·	1.7 km	MPC · JPL
583183	2016 EW_{221}	—	December 29, 2014	Haleakala	Pan-STARRS 1	·	1.8 km	MPC · JPL
583184	2016 EL_{222}	—	December 18, 2014	Haleakala	Pan-STARRS 1	·	1.2 km	MPC · JPL
583185	2016 EQ_{222}	—	May 13, 2012	Mount Lemmon	Mount Lemmon Survey	·	1.5 km	MPC · JPL
583186	2016 ET_{222}	—	March 1, 2012	Mount Lemmon	Mount Lemmon Survey	·	1 km	MPC · JPL
583187	2016 EV_{222}	—	March 10, 2016	Haleakala	Pan-STARRS 1	·	990 m	MPC · JPL
583188	2016 EH_{223}	—	April 3, 2008	Mount Lemmon	Mount Lemmon Survey	MAR	770 m	MPC · JPL
583189	2016 EP_{223}	—	March 31, 2008	Mount Lemmon	Mount Lemmon Survey	KRM	1.8 km	MPC · JPL
583190	2016 EO_{224}	—	March 6, 2016	Haleakala	Pan-STARRS 1	ADE	1.4 km	MPC · JPL
583191	2016 ET_{224}	—	January 30, 2011	Mount Lemmon	Mount Lemmon Survey	·	1.3 km	MPC · JPL
583192	2016 EV_{225}	—	March 4, 2016	Haleakala	Pan-STARRS 1	·	1.1 km	MPC · JPL
583193	2016 EF_{226}	—	April 19, 2012	Mount Lemmon	Mount Lemmon Survey	·	900 m	MPC · JPL
583194	2016 EX_{227}	—	September 25, 2013	Mount Lemmon	Mount Lemmon Survey	EUN	1.2 km	MPC · JPL
583195	2016 EF_{228}	—	January 22, 2002	Kitt Peak	Spacewatch	·	1.2 km	MPC · JPL
583196	2016 EG_{228}	—	March 4, 2016	Haleakala	Pan-STARRS 1	EUN	900 m	MPC · JPL
583197	2016 EJ_{228}	—	January 5, 2006	Mount Lemmon	Mount Lemmon Survey	·	1.5 km	MPC · JPL
583198	2016 EK_{228}	—	March 16, 2007	Kitt Peak	Spacewatch	·	1.5 km	MPC · JPL
583199	2016 EQ_{228}	—	March 9, 2007	Kitt Peak	Spacewatch	MIS	2.2 km	MPC · JPL
583200	2016 EB_{229}	—	February 25, 2007	Mount Lemmon	Mount Lemmon Survey	·	1.9 km	MPC · JPL

== 583201–583300 ==
back to top

Designation			Discovery			Properties		Ref
Permanent	Provisional	Named after	Date	Site	Discoverer(s)	Category	Diam.	Ref
583201	2016 EC_{229}	—	September 7, 2008	Mount Lemmon	Mount Lemmon Survey	526	2.3 km	MPC · JPL
583202	2016 ET_{229}	—	February 4, 2012	Haleakala	Pan-STARRS 1	·	950 m	MPC · JPL
583203	2016 EA_{231}	—	April 15, 2012	Haleakala	Pan-STARRS 1	·	1.2 km	MPC · JPL
583204	2016 EG_{231}	—	March 3, 2016	Haleakala	Pan-STARRS 1	MAR	850 m	MPC · JPL
583205	2016 EQ_{232}	—	February 25, 2011	Mount Lemmon	Mount Lemmon Survey	DOR	1.7 km	MPC · JPL
583206	2016 ER_{232}	—	August 12, 2013	Haleakala	Pan-STARRS 1	·	990 m	MPC · JPL
583207	2016 EA_{233}	—	October 30, 2014	Mount Lemmon	Mount Lemmon Survey	·	910 m	MPC · JPL
583208	2016 EQ_{234}	—	November 1, 2013	Mount Lemmon	Mount Lemmon Survey	·	1.3 km	MPC · JPL
583209	2016 EV_{234}	—	November 9, 2013	Mount Lemmon	Mount Lemmon Survey	·	1.5 km	MPC · JPL
583210	2016 EG_{235}	—	February 10, 2011	Mount Lemmon	Mount Lemmon Survey	·	1.2 km	MPC · JPL
583211	2016 EH_{235}	—	April 25, 2003	Kitt Peak	Spacewatch	·	1.4 km	MPC · JPL
583212	2016 EO_{236}	—	January 4, 2011	Mount Lemmon	Mount Lemmon Survey	MAR	780 m	MPC · JPL
583213	2016 ES_{237}	—	February 17, 2007	Mount Lemmon	Mount Lemmon Survey	·	1.0 km	MPC · JPL
583214	2016 EC_{238}	—	February 4, 2016	Flagstaff	Wasserman, L. H.	·	1.3 km	MPC · JPL
583215	2016 EJ_{238}	—	April 2, 2005	Mount Lemmon	Mount Lemmon Survey	·	990 m	MPC · JPL
583216	2016 EF_{239}	—	January 16, 2015	Haleakala	Pan-STARRS 1	·	1.3 km	MPC · JPL
583217	2016 EG_{240}	—	April 28, 2003	Anderson Mesa	LONEOS	EUN	1.3 km	MPC · JPL
583218	2016 EQ_{241}	—	January 28, 2011	Mount Lemmon	Mount Lemmon Survey	PAD	1.1 km	MPC · JPL
583219	2016 EA_{243}	—	March 10, 2016	Haleakala	Pan-STARRS 1	·	1.1 km	MPC · JPL
583220	2016 EL_{244}	—	January 13, 2015	Haleakala	Pan-STARRS 1	·	1.7 km	MPC · JPL
583221	2016 ED_{245}	—	March 11, 2016	Haleakala	Pan-STARRS 1	EUN	1.2 km	MPC · JPL
583222	2016 ET_{245}	—	September 13, 2013	Kitt Peak	Spacewatch	MRX	860 m	MPC · JPL
583223	2016 EB_{246}	—	September 3, 2013	Calar Alto	F. Hormuth	·	1.5 km	MPC · JPL
583224	2016 EV_{247}	—	December 26, 2014	Haleakala	Pan-STARRS 1	·	1.4 km	MPC · JPL
583225	2016 EP_{248}	—	March 30, 2008	Kitt Peak	Spacewatch	·	960 m	MPC · JPL
583226	2016 ER_{248}	—	August 27, 2005	Palomar	NEAT	·	1.4 km	MPC · JPL
583227	2016 ES_{248}	—	September 19, 2014	Haleakala	Pan-STARRS 1	·	860 m	MPC · JPL
583228	2016 EN_{249}	—	January 30, 2011	Haleakala	Pan-STARRS 1	·	1.2 km	MPC · JPL
583229	2016 ER_{249}	—	March 13, 2016	Haleakala	Pan-STARRS 1	·	820 m	MPC · JPL
583230	2016 EJ_{250}	—	May 11, 2003	Kitt Peak	Spacewatch	·	1.4 km	MPC · JPL
583231	2016 EQ_{250}	—	March 4, 2016	Haleakala	Pan-STARRS 1	·	1.4 km	MPC · JPL
583232	2016 EA_{251}	—	March 2, 2016	Haleakala	Pan-STARRS 1	·	1.4 km	MPC · JPL
583233	2016 EW_{262}	—	December 5, 2005	Mount Lemmon	Mount Lemmon Survey	·	1.5 km	MPC · JPL
583234	2016 EX_{264}	—	March 12, 2016	Haleakala	Pan-STARRS 1	·	1.5 km	MPC · JPL
583235	2016 EB_{265}	—	March 4, 2016	Haleakala	Pan-STARRS 1	·	1.6 km	MPC · JPL
583236	2016 ED_{265}	—	March 4, 2016	Haleakala	Pan-STARRS 1	·	2.0 km	MPC · JPL
583237	2016 EP_{265}	—	March 15, 2016	Haleakala	Pan-STARRS 1	·	1.3 km	MPC · JPL
583238	2016 ED_{267}	—	March 12, 2016	Mount Lemmon	Mount Lemmon Survey	·	440 m	MPC · JPL
583239	2016 EZ_{268}	—	March 10, 2016	Haleakala	Pan-STARRS 1	·	1.3 km	MPC · JPL
583240	2016 EE_{269}	—	February 7, 2011	Mount Lemmon	Mount Lemmon Survey	·	1.5 km	MPC · JPL
583241	2016 EQ_{295}	—	December 29, 2014	Haleakala	Pan-STARRS 1	·	2.3 km	MPC · JPL
583242	2016 FW	—	September 1, 2005	Kitt Peak	Spacewatch	·	1.3 km	MPC · JPL
583243	2016 FZ	—	July 12, 2013	Haleakala	Pan-STARRS 1	EUN	1.1 km	MPC · JPL
583244	2016 FF_{4}	—	February 16, 2007	Catalina	CSS	·	2.3 km	MPC · JPL
583245	2016 FA_{8}	—	October 15, 2001	Apache Point	SDSS	·	1.4 km	MPC · JPL
583246	2016 FB_{8}	—	September 29, 2005	Mount Lemmon	Mount Lemmon Survey	EUN	970 m	MPC · JPL
583247	2016 FC_{9}	—	April 28, 2012	Mount Lemmon	Mount Lemmon Survey	·	1.5 km	MPC · JPL
583248	2016 FP_{9}	—	March 12, 2008	Mount Lemmon	Mount Lemmon Survey	·	2.0 km	MPC · JPL
583249	2016 FU_{9}	—	October 1, 2013	Mount Lemmon	Mount Lemmon Survey	·	1.3 km	MPC · JPL
583250	2016 FU_{11}	—	November 26, 2014	Mount Lemmon	Mount Lemmon Survey	·	1.8 km	MPC · JPL
583251	2016 FC_{17}	—	May 29, 1995	Kitt Peak	Spacewatch	·	1.5 km	MPC · JPL
583252	2016 FD_{21}	—	November 26, 2014	Mount Lemmon	Mount Lemmon Survey	·	1.7 km	MPC · JPL
583253	2016 FN_{23}	—	October 23, 2009	Kitt Peak	Spacewatch	·	1.5 km	MPC · JPL
583254	2016 FC_{25}	—	May 24, 2000	Mauna Kea	C. Veillet, D. D. Balam	·	930 m	MPC · JPL
583255	2016 FG_{26}	—	August 12, 2013	Haleakala	Pan-STARRS 1	·	930 m	MPC · JPL
583256	2016 FX_{26}	—	July 17, 2004	Cerro Tololo	Deep Ecliptic Survey	·	1.3 km	MPC · JPL
583257	2016 FP_{30}	—	November 20, 2009	Mount Lemmon	Mount Lemmon Survey	·	1.5 km	MPC · JPL
583258	2016 FA_{31}	—	April 15, 2008	Kitt Peak	Spacewatch	·	1.2 km	MPC · JPL
583259	2016 FX_{32}	—	January 26, 2011	Kitt Peak	Spacewatch	WIT	830 m	MPC · JPL
583260	2016 FL_{33}	—	April 16, 2012	Haleakala	Pan-STARRS 1	·	780 m	MPC · JPL
583261	2016 FY_{34}	—	March 26, 2007	Mount Lemmon	Mount Lemmon Survey	·	1.5 km	MPC · JPL
583262	2016 FE_{36}	—	March 10, 2016	Haleakala	Pan-STARRS 1	NYS	950 m	MPC · JPL
583263	2016 FQ_{36}	—	April 11, 2008	Mount Lemmon	Mount Lemmon Survey	·	1.1 km	MPC · JPL
583264	2016 FV_{36}	—	September 20, 2009	Mount Lemmon	Mount Lemmon Survey	·	1.5 km	MPC · JPL
583265	2016 FA_{37}	—	May 15, 2012	Haleakala	Pan-STARRS 1	·	1.1 km	MPC · JPL
583266	2016 FC_{38}	—	February 11, 2016	Haleakala	Pan-STARRS 1	·	1.9 km	MPC · JPL
583267	2016 FV_{38}	—	February 10, 2011	Mount Lemmon	Mount Lemmon Survey	·	1.4 km	MPC · JPL
583268	2016 FX_{38}	—	December 27, 2005	Kitt Peak	Spacewatch	·	1.9 km	MPC · JPL
583269	2016 FQ_{39}	—	December 15, 2007	Mount Lemmon	Mount Lemmon Survey	·	940 m	MPC · JPL
583270	2016 FD_{44}	—	January 18, 2009	Mount Lemmon	Mount Lemmon Survey	·	670 m	MPC · JPL
583271	2016 FU_{49}	—	April 1, 2008	Mount Lemmon	Mount Lemmon Survey	·	780 m	MPC · JPL
583272	2016 FW_{49}	—	August 9, 2013	Haleakala	Pan-STARRS 1	EUN	1.1 km	MPC · JPL
583273	2016 FO_{50}	—	November 24, 2011	Mount Lemmon	Mount Lemmon Survey	·	650 m	MPC · JPL
583274	2016 FR_{50}	—	September 24, 2013	Haleakala	Pan-STARRS 1	·	1.9 km	MPC · JPL
583275	2016 FQ_{52}	—	March 11, 2008	Kitt Peak	Spacewatch	·	1.0 km	MPC · JPL
583276	2016 FT_{54}	—	December 24, 2014	Mount Lemmon	Mount Lemmon Survey	·	2.6 km	MPC · JPL
583277	2016 FE_{57}	—	September 5, 2008	Kitt Peak	Spacewatch	DOR	2.5 km	MPC · JPL
583278	2016 FV_{62}	—	March 11, 2007	Kitt Peak	Spacewatch	·	980 m	MPC · JPL
583279	2016 FT_{63}	—	March 18, 2016	Haleakala	Pan-STARRS 1	·	1.6 km	MPC · JPL
583280	2016 FB_{64}	—	March 16, 2016	Haleakala	Pan-STARRS 1	EUN	980 m	MPC · JPL
583281	2016 FU_{64}	—	December 13, 2010	Mount Lemmon	Mount Lemmon Survey	·	1.5 km	MPC · JPL
583282	2016 FF_{65}	—	March 16, 2012	Kitt Peak	Spacewatch	·	1.0 km	MPC · JPL
583283	2016 FL_{66}	—	November 6, 2013	Haleakala	Pan-STARRS 1	·	1.6 km	MPC · JPL
583284	2016 FY_{66}	—	June 9, 2012	Mount Lemmon	Mount Lemmon Survey	·	1.2 km	MPC · JPL
583285	2016 FK_{68}	—	September 10, 2004	Kitt Peak	Spacewatch	(194)	1.5 km	MPC · JPL
583286	2016 FO_{70}	—	March 16, 2016	Haleakala	Pan-STARRS 1	·	530 m	MPC · JPL
583287	2016 FH_{71}	—	November 17, 2009	Mount Lemmon	Mount Lemmon Survey	·	1.7 km	MPC · JPL
583288	2016 FU_{72}	—	March 17, 2016	Haleakala	Pan-STARRS 1	·	1.5 km	MPC · JPL
583289	2016 FP_{78}	—	March 18, 2016	Mount Lemmon	Mount Lemmon Survey	·	1.4 km	MPC · JPL
583290	2016 GU_{1}	—	November 29, 2014	Mount Lemmon	Mount Lemmon Survey	·	1.7 km	MPC · JPL
583291	2016 GN_{3}	—	May 13, 2009	Kitt Peak	Spacewatch	NYS	810 m	MPC · JPL
583292	2016 GQ_{3}	—	April 10, 2008	Kitt Peak	Spacewatch	·	1.2 km	MPC · JPL
583293	2016 GG_{6}	—	November 9, 2009	Mount Lemmon	Mount Lemmon Survey	·	1.6 km	MPC · JPL
583294	2016 GS_{7}	—	January 3, 2012	Mount Lemmon	Mount Lemmon Survey	·	900 m	MPC · JPL
583295	2016 GH_{9}	—	January 2, 2011	Mount Lemmon	Mount Lemmon Survey	·	880 m	MPC · JPL
583296	2016 GQ_{9}	—	March 12, 2011	Mount Lemmon	Mount Lemmon Survey	·	1.6 km	MPC · JPL
583297	2016 GL_{11}	—	February 10, 2016	Haleakala	Pan-STARRS 1	BRG	1.0 km	MPC · JPL
583298	2016 GR_{11}	—	August 8, 2013	Haleakala	Pan-STARRS 1	·	1.1 km	MPC · JPL
583299	2016 GV_{11}	—	October 15, 2009	Mount Lemmon	Mount Lemmon Survey	·	1.4 km	MPC · JPL
583300	2016 GG_{14}	—	April 13, 2004	Kitt Peak	Spacewatch	·	750 m	MPC · JPL

== 583301–583400 ==
back to top

Designation			Discovery			Properties		Ref
Permanent	Provisional	Named after	Date	Site	Discoverer(s)	Category	Diam.	Ref
583301	2016 GQ_{19}	—	April 21, 2012	Mount Lemmon	Mount Lemmon Survey	·	1.2 km	MPC · JPL
583302	2016 GX_{19}	—	January 19, 2004	Kitt Peak	Spacewatch	·	840 m	MPC · JPL
583303	2016 GL_{20}	—	April 25, 2004	Kitt Peak	Spacewatch	(194)	1.1 km	MPC · JPL
583304	2016 GF_{25}	—	December 5, 2005	Mount Lemmon	Mount Lemmon Survey	·	1.4 km	MPC · JPL
583305	2016 GL_{27}	—	April 15, 2012	Haleakala	Pan-STARRS 1	·	1.0 km	MPC · JPL
583306	2016 GS_{27}	—	September 15, 2009	Kitt Peak	Spacewatch	(17392)	1.3 km	MPC · JPL
583307	2016 GZ_{27}	—	September 15, 2009	Kitt Peak	Spacewatch	·	1.3 km	MPC · JPL
583308	2016 GR_{28}	—	February 16, 2012	Haleakala	Pan-STARRS 1	·	1.0 km	MPC · JPL
583309	2016 GY_{29}	—	March 11, 2016	Haleakala	Pan-STARRS 1	·	850 m	MPC · JPL
583310	2016 GA_{32}	—	April 8, 2002	Kitt Peak	Spacewatch	HOF	2.1 km	MPC · JPL
583311	2016 GQ_{32}	—	May 15, 2012	Mount Lemmon	Mount Lemmon Survey	·	1.4 km	MPC · JPL
583312	2016 GR_{33}	—	April 17, 2012	Kitt Peak	Spacewatch	·	1.2 km	MPC · JPL
583313	2016 GH_{34}	—	March 13, 2008	Kitt Peak	Spacewatch	·	950 m	MPC · JPL
583314	2016 GH_{36}	—	April 15, 2012	Haleakala	Pan-STARRS 1	·	1.1 km	MPC · JPL
583315	2016 GO_{40}	—	October 25, 2005	Kitt Peak	Spacewatch	·	1.1 km	MPC · JPL
583316	2016 GD_{42}	—	September 20, 2009	Mount Lemmon	Mount Lemmon Survey	RAF	660 m	MPC · JPL
583317	2016 GN_{42}	—	September 30, 1995	Kitt Peak	Spacewatch	·	2.3 km	MPC · JPL
583318	2016 GU_{42}	—	October 12, 2010	Mount Lemmon	Mount Lemmon Survey	·	740 m	MPC · JPL
583319	2016 GX_{44}	—	September 19, 2001	Kitt Peak	Spacewatch	·	960 m	MPC · JPL
583320	2016 GL_{47}	—	September 10, 2002	Haleakala	NEAT	·	1.4 km	MPC · JPL
583321	2016 GM_{48}	—	July 14, 2013	Haleakala	Pan-STARRS 1	·	890 m	MPC · JPL
583322	2016 GC_{53}	—	May 15, 2012	Haleakala	Pan-STARRS 1	MIS	2.1 km	MPC · JPL
583323	2016 GL_{54}	—	August 27, 2006	Kitt Peak	Spacewatch	MAS	740 m	MPC · JPL
583324	2016 GR_{54}	—	November 10, 2009	Mount Lemmon	Mount Lemmon Survey	·	980 m	MPC · JPL
583325	2016 GW_{58}	—	September 24, 2008	Mount Lemmon	Mount Lemmon Survey	·	1.8 km	MPC · JPL
583326	2016 GE_{60}	—	March 11, 2008	Mount Lemmon	Mount Lemmon Survey	PHO	800 m	MPC · JPL
583327	2016 GJ_{67}	—	August 15, 2013	Haleakala	Pan-STARRS 1	·	1.2 km	MPC · JPL
583328	2016 GM_{67}	—	July 31, 2000	Cerro Tololo	Deep Ecliptic Survey	·	520 m	MPC · JPL
583329	2016 GO_{67}	—	March 28, 2008	Mount Lemmon	Mount Lemmon Survey	·	850 m	MPC · JPL
583330	2016 GX_{67}	—	March 1, 2011	Mount Lemmon	Mount Lemmon Survey	·	1.1 km	MPC · JPL
583331	2016 GH_{68}	—	August 9, 2013	Haleakala	Pan-STARRS 1	·	980 m	MPC · JPL
583332	2016 GT_{68}	—	February 10, 2008	Kitt Peak	Spacewatch	·	930 m	MPC · JPL
583333	2016 GA_{69}	—	April 21, 2012	Kitt Peak	Spacewatch	BRG	950 m	MPC · JPL
583334	2016 GX_{70}	—	June 18, 2013	Haleakala	Pan-STARRS 1	·	970 m	MPC · JPL
583335	2016 GS_{81}	—	November 18, 1998	La Palma	A. Fitzsimmons, R. Budden	·	820 m	MPC · JPL
583336	2016 GH_{82}	—	January 11, 2008	Kitt Peak	Spacewatch	MAS	600 m	MPC · JPL
583337	2016 GS_{84}	—	November 26, 2014	Haleakala	Pan-STARRS 1	·	1.1 km	MPC · JPL
583338	2016 GZ_{90}	—	April 20, 2012	Kitt Peak	Spacewatch	·	1.0 km	MPC · JPL
583339	2016 GQ_{92}	—	February 11, 2016	Haleakala	Pan-STARRS 1	·	1.5 km	MPC · JPL
583340	2016 GE_{95}	—	July 14, 2013	Haleakala	Pan-STARRS 1	·	1.3 km	MPC · JPL
583341	2016 GV_{98}	—	September 24, 2009	Mount Lemmon	Mount Lemmon Survey	AEO	1.0 km	MPC · JPL
583342	2016 GS_{108}	—	December 27, 2006	Charleston	R. Holmes	·	1.2 km	MPC · JPL
583343	2016 GR_{113}	—	April 1, 2016	Haleakala	Pan-STARRS 1	·	1.1 km	MPC · JPL
583344	2016 GC_{114}	—	October 27, 2009	Kitt Peak	Spacewatch	·	1.5 km	MPC · JPL
583345	2016 GQ_{115}	—	November 11, 2009	Mount Lemmon	Mount Lemmon Survey	·	1.3 km	MPC · JPL
583346	2016 GB_{118}	—	August 9, 2013	Haleakala	Pan-STARRS 1	·	970 m	MPC · JPL
583347	2016 GK_{119}	—	February 11, 2016	Haleakala	Pan-STARRS 1	AGN	940 m	MPC · JPL
583348	2016 GC_{122}	—	January 15, 2015	Haleakala	Pan-STARRS 1	·	1.5 km	MPC · JPL
583349	2016 GP_{124}	—	April 20, 2012	Siding Spring	SSS	·	1.7 km	MPC · JPL
583350	2016 GQ_{125}	—	August 14, 2013	Haleakala	Pan-STARRS 1	MAR	670 m	MPC · JPL
583351	2016 GS_{127}	—	November 17, 2014	Haleakala	Pan-STARRS 1	·	690 m	MPC · JPL
583352	2016 GA_{128}	—	April 21, 2004	Kitt Peak	Spacewatch	·	1.1 km	MPC · JPL
583353	2016 GO_{128}	—	April 25, 2012	Mayhill-ISON	L. Elenin	·	1.2 km	MPC · JPL
583354	2016 GU_{128}	—	February 25, 2007	Kitt Peak	Spacewatch	·	1.4 km	MPC · JPL
583355	2016 GW_{129}	—	March 29, 2016	Haleakala	Pan-STARRS 1	·	1.2 km	MPC · JPL
583356	2016 GW_{130}	—	February 5, 2011	Mount Lemmon	Mount Lemmon Survey	AGN	990 m	MPC · JPL
583357	2016 GV_{133}	—	January 28, 2011	Mount Lemmon	Mount Lemmon Survey	·	1.3 km	MPC · JPL
583358	2016 GX_{139}	—	February 1, 1995	Kitt Peak	Spacewatch	·	610 m	MPC · JPL
583359	2016 GA_{141}	—	March 4, 2016	Haleakala	Pan-STARRS 1	·	1.0 km	MPC · JPL
583360	2016 GS_{141}	—	November 12, 2007	Mount Lemmon	Mount Lemmon Survey	·	1.6 km	MPC · JPL
583361	2016 GL_{144}	—	April 20, 2012	Mount Lemmon	Mount Lemmon Survey	·	1.4 km	MPC · JPL
583362	2016 GY_{145}	—	September 24, 2013	Mount Lemmon	Mount Lemmon Survey	·	1.9 km	MPC · JPL
583363	2016 GC_{148}	—	October 2, 2013	Haleakala	Pan-STARRS 1	HOF	2.2 km	MPC · JPL
583364	2016 GZ_{148}	—	January 10, 2007	Kitt Peak	Spacewatch	·	1.3 km	MPC · JPL
583365	2016 GF_{150}	—	March 11, 2007	Kitt Peak	Spacewatch	·	1.5 km	MPC · JPL
583366	2016 GH_{151}	—	February 1, 1995	Kitt Peak	Spacewatch	·	1.1 km	MPC · JPL
583367	2016 GK_{151}	—	September 1, 2013	Mount Lemmon	Mount Lemmon Survey	·	1.4 km	MPC · JPL
583368	2016 GS_{153}	—	June 13, 2005	Mount Lemmon	Mount Lemmon Survey	·	1.2 km	MPC · JPL
583369	2016 GE_{155}	—	August 20, 2014	Haleakala	Pan-STARRS 1	·	1.3 km	MPC · JPL
583370	2016 GF_{155}	—	April 28, 2008	Mount Lemmon	Mount Lemmon Survey	·	1.1 km	MPC · JPL
583371	2016 GN_{155}	—	February 9, 2016	Haleakala	Pan-STARRS 1	·	890 m	MPC · JPL
583372	2016 GQ_{155}	—	April 25, 2012	Kitt Peak	Spacewatch	·	1.3 km	MPC · JPL
583373	2016 GD_{158}	—	April 29, 2008	Mount Lemmon	Mount Lemmon Survey	·	970 m	MPC · JPL
583374	2016 GP_{160}	—	February 11, 2008	Mount Lemmon	Mount Lemmon Survey	·	1.2 km	MPC · JPL
583375	2016 GS_{163}	—	March 25, 2012	Kitt Peak	Spacewatch	·	800 m	MPC · JPL
583376	2016 GV_{163}	—	March 14, 2007	Mount Lemmon	Mount Lemmon Survey	·	1.8 km	MPC · JPL
583377	2016 GL_{164}	—	August 27, 2009	Kitt Peak	Spacewatch	·	960 m	MPC · JPL
583378	2016 GD_{165}	—	November 15, 2010	Mount Lemmon	Mount Lemmon Survey	·	1.2 km	MPC · JPL
583379	2016 GV_{165}	—	August 27, 2013	Haleakala	Pan-STARRS 1	·	910 m	MPC · JPL
583380	2016 GB_{166}	—	January 18, 2015	Mount Lemmon	Mount Lemmon Survey	·	1.4 km	MPC · JPL
583381	2016 GO_{167}	—	March 1, 2011	Mount Lemmon	Mount Lemmon Survey	GEF	800 m	MPC · JPL
583382	2016 GP_{167}	—	September 14, 2013	Haleakala	Pan-STARRS 1	·	1.0 km	MPC · JPL
583383	2016 GR_{167}	—	November 23, 2014	Haleakala	Pan-STARRS 1	·	880 m	MPC · JPL
583384	2016 GG_{169}	—	April 27, 2012	Kitt Peak	Spacewatch	MAR	810 m	MPC · JPL
583385	2016 GT_{170}	—	April 20, 2012	Mount Lemmon	Mount Lemmon Survey	(5)	1.1 km	MPC · JPL
583386	2016 GY_{173}	—	January 14, 2011	Kitt Peak	Spacewatch	·	1.2 km	MPC · JPL
583387	2016 GN_{174}	—	April 3, 2016	Haleakala	Pan-STARRS 1	·	1.1 km	MPC · JPL
583388	2016 GZ_{175}	—	December 16, 2009	Mount Lemmon	Mount Lemmon Survey	·	2.2 km	MPC · JPL
583389	2016 GZ_{176}	—	February 13, 2011	Mount Lemmon	Mount Lemmon Survey	·	1.1 km	MPC · JPL
583390	2016 GP_{177}	—	May 3, 2008	Mount Lemmon	Mount Lemmon Survey	·	1.0 km	MPC · JPL
583391	2016 GV_{177}	—	January 14, 2015	Haleakala	Pan-STARRS 1	·	1.4 km	MPC · JPL
583392	2016 GH_{178}	—	December 21, 2014	Mount Lemmon	Mount Lemmon Survey	MRX	980 m	MPC · JPL
583393	2016 GK_{178}	—	May 20, 2012	Mount Lemmon	Mount Lemmon Survey	·	1.1 km	MPC · JPL
583394	2016 GQ_{178}	—	December 1, 2005	Kitt Peak	Wasserman, L. H., Millis, R. L.	·	1.5 km	MPC · JPL
583395	2016 GG_{179}	—	July 13, 2013	Haleakala	Pan-STARRS 1	V	600 m	MPC · JPL
583396	2016 GL_{179}	—	January 21, 2015	Haleakala	Pan-STARRS 1	·	1.3 km	MPC · JPL
583397	2016 GH_{180}	—	April 27, 2008	Kitt Peak	Spacewatch	·	980 m	MPC · JPL
583398	2016 GC_{181}	—	April 3, 2016	Haleakala	Pan-STARRS 1	·	1.5 km	MPC · JPL
583399	2016 GN_{181}	—	April 25, 2008	Kitt Peak	Spacewatch	·	1.1 km	MPC · JPL
583400	2016 GK_{182}	—	February 11, 2016	Haleakala	Pan-STARRS 1	·	990 m	MPC · JPL

== 583401–583500 ==
back to top

Designation			Discovery			Properties		Ref
Permanent	Provisional	Named after	Date	Site	Discoverer(s)	Category	Diam.	Ref
583401	2016 GQ_{184}	—	February 11, 2016	Mount Lemmon	Mount Lemmon Survey	(5)	1.3 km	MPC · JPL
583402	2016 GK_{185}	—	February 11, 2016	Haleakala	Pan-STARRS 1	·	1.6 km	MPC · JPL
583403	2016 GA_{187}	—	December 28, 2014	Mount Lemmon	Mount Lemmon Survey	·	1.5 km	MPC · JPL
583404	2016 GJ_{188}	—	August 1, 2000	Kitt Peak	Spacewatch	·	470 m	MPC · JPL
583405	2016 GP_{191}	—	February 8, 2011	Mount Lemmon	Mount Lemmon Survey	·	1.4 km	MPC · JPL
583406	2016 GR_{191}	—	March 15, 2016	Haleakala	Pan-STARRS 1	·	1.0 km	MPC · JPL
583407	2016 GE_{192}	—	January 13, 2015	Haleakala	Pan-STARRS 1	·	1.6 km	MPC · JPL
583408	2016 GG_{192}	—	April 3, 2016	Haleakala	Pan-STARRS 1	·	1.6 km	MPC · JPL
583409	2016 GX_{192}	—	January 26, 2015	Haleakala	Pan-STARRS 1	GEF	960 m	MPC · JPL
583410	2016 GZ_{194}	—	April 18, 2007	Kitt Peak	Spacewatch	PAD	1.3 km	MPC · JPL
583411	2016 GL_{198}	—	March 15, 2008	Mount Lemmon	Mount Lemmon Survey	·	1.7 km	MPC · JPL
583412	2016 GA_{199}	—	February 17, 2007	Mount Lemmon	Mount Lemmon Survey	·	1.6 km	MPC · JPL
583413	2016 GX_{199}	—	March 29, 2008	Kitt Peak	Spacewatch	·	1.1 km	MPC · JPL
583414	2016 GK_{200}	—	August 29, 2013	Haleakala	Pan-STARRS 1	·	1.3 km	MPC · JPL
583415	2016 GD_{201}	—	January 28, 2011	Mount Lemmon	Mount Lemmon Survey	·	1.9 km	MPC · JPL
583416	2016 GE_{202}	—	March 23, 2003	Apache Point	SDSS Collaboration	·	1.4 km	MPC · JPL
583417	2016 GU_{202}	—	December 19, 2007	Mount Lemmon	Mount Lemmon Survey	·	1.3 km	MPC · JPL
583418 Herbertgush	2016 GW_{202}	Herbertgush	July 24, 2007	Mauna Kea	D. D. Balam, K. M. Perrett	·	500 m	MPC · JPL
583419	2016 GW_{203}	—	February 5, 2016	Haleakala	Pan-STARRS 1	EUN	900 m	MPC · JPL
583420	2016 GF_{205}	—	March 15, 2007	Mount Lemmon	Mount Lemmon Survey	JUN	880 m	MPC · JPL
583421	2016 GH_{205}	—	February 10, 2007	Mount Lemmon	Mount Lemmon Survey	·	1.6 km	MPC · JPL
583422	2016 GG_{206}	—	April 7, 2016	Elena Remote	Oreshko, A.	·	1.6 km	MPC · JPL
583423	2016 GO_{207}	—	September 16, 2009	Mount Lemmon	Mount Lemmon Survey	EUN	1.2 km	MPC · JPL
583424	2016 GB_{211}	—	November 3, 2000	Kitt Peak	Spacewatch	(12739)	1.3 km	MPC · JPL
583425	2016 GN_{217}	—	January 17, 2007	Kitt Peak	Spacewatch	EUN	1.1 km	MPC · JPL
583426	2016 GO_{217}	—	November 10, 2014	Haleakala	Pan-STARRS 1	·	1.7 km	MPC · JPL
583427	2016 GP_{217}	—	March 11, 2016	Haleakala	Pan-STARRS 1	·	1.2 km	MPC · JPL
583428	2016 GE_{218}	—	August 25, 2000	Cerro Tololo	Deep Ecliptic Survey	·	1.6 km	MPC · JPL
583429	2016 GL_{218}	—	February 11, 2016	Haleakala	Pan-STARRS 1	·	1.4 km	MPC · JPL
583430	2016 GN_{218}	—	March 5, 2016	Haleakala	Pan-STARRS 1	·	1.9 km	MPC · JPL
583431	2016 GZ_{218}	—	November 30, 2000	Apache Point	SDSS	·	1.8 km	MPC · JPL
583432	2016 GM_{219}	—	March 16, 2016	Haleakala	Pan-STARRS 1	KON	2.1 km	MPC · JPL
583433	2016 GF_{224}	—	September 15, 2004	Kitt Peak	Spacewatch	·	2.0 km	MPC · JPL
583434	2016 GF_{226}	—	August 11, 2012	Siding Spring	SSS	·	1.8 km	MPC · JPL
583435	2016 GL_{227}	—	May 2, 2008	Mount Lemmon	Mount Lemmon Survey	·	1.1 km	MPC · JPL
583436	2016 GU_{229}	—	September 25, 2006	Mount Lemmon	Mount Lemmon Survey	·	2.6 km	MPC · JPL
583437	2016 GO_{231}	—	May 15, 2012	Haleakala	Pan-STARRS 1	·	1.1 km	MPC · JPL
583438	2016 GU_{231}	—	April 1, 2006	Eskridge	G. Hug	BRA	1.3 km	MPC · JPL
583439	2016 GX_{231}	—	August 12, 2012	Siding Spring	SSS	·	1.4 km	MPC · JPL
583440	2016 GU_{232}	—	April 14, 2016	Haleakala	Pan-STARRS 1	·	840 m	MPC · JPL
583441	2016 GQ_{235}	—	July 25, 2006	Mount Lemmon	Mount Lemmon Survey	·	900 m	MPC · JPL
583442	2016 GO_{236}	—	March 15, 2016	Haleakala	Pan-STARRS 1	·	1.3 km	MPC · JPL
583443	2016 GR_{236}	—	May 10, 2003	Kitt Peak	Spacewatch	HNS	1.2 km	MPC · JPL
583444	2016 GW_{236}	—	April 14, 2016	Haleakala	Pan-STARRS 1	·	1.3 km	MPC · JPL
583445	2016 GD_{237}	—	April 14, 2016	Haleakala	Pan-STARRS 1	·	1.7 km	MPC · JPL
583446	2016 GE_{237}	—	October 27, 2013	Kitt Peak	Spacewatch	MAR	850 m	MPC · JPL
583447	2016 GV_{237}	—	September 28, 2003	Anderson Mesa	LONEOS	·	1.7 km	MPC · JPL
583448	2016 GJ_{238}	—	February 25, 2011	Mount Lemmon	Mount Lemmon Survey	·	1.4 km	MPC · JPL
583449	2016 GL_{238}	—	February 9, 2002	Kitt Peak	Spacewatch	·	1.4 km	MPC · JPL
583450	2016 GR_{239}	—	March 9, 2003	Anderson Mesa	LONEOS	(1547)	1.7 km	MPC · JPL
583451	2016 GQ_{241}	—	February 13, 2015	Mount Lemmon	Mount Lemmon Survey	·	1.6 km	MPC · JPL
583452	2016 GN_{242}	—	May 18, 2012	Mount Lemmon	Mount Lemmon Survey	EUN	890 m	MPC · JPL
583453	2016 GR_{242}	—	December 20, 2014	Haleakala	Pan-STARRS 1	·	1.4 km	MPC · JPL
583454	2016 GN_{243}	—	July 28, 2005	Palomar	NEAT	·	1.3 km	MPC · JPL
583455	2016 GO_{243}	—	May 28, 2012	Mount Lemmon	Mount Lemmon Survey	·	1.2 km	MPC · JPL
583456	2016 GT_{243}	—	February 27, 2007	Kitt Peak	Spacewatch	·	2.2 km	MPC · JPL
583457	2016 GY_{243}	—	June 16, 2012	Mount Lemmon	Mount Lemmon Survey	·	1.6 km	MPC · JPL
583458	2016 GZ_{244}	—	September 9, 2013	Haleakala	Pan-STARRS 1	·	1.2 km	MPC · JPL
583459	2016 GY_{245}	—	April 11, 1999	Kitt Peak	Spacewatch	EUN	1.2 km	MPC · JPL
583460	2016 GZ_{245}	—	January 2, 2012	Mount Lemmon	Mount Lemmon Survey	(2076)	600 m	MPC · JPL
583461	2016 GN_{246}	—	April 29, 2008	Kitt Peak	Spacewatch	EUN	750 m	MPC · JPL
583462	2016 GP_{246}	—	January 22, 2006	Mount Lemmon	Mount Lemmon Survey	·	1.6 km	MPC · JPL
583463	2016 GY_{247}	—	August 26, 2000	Cerro Tololo	Deep Ecliptic Survey	MIS	1.9 km	MPC · JPL
583464	2016 GP_{248}	—	February 21, 2003	Palomar	NEAT	·	1.4 km	MPC · JPL
583465	2016 GF_{249}	—	November 4, 2014	Mount Lemmon	Mount Lemmon Survey	·	1.8 km	MPC · JPL
583466	2016 GC_{250}	—	October 16, 2001	Palomar	NEAT	·	2.2 km	MPC · JPL
583467	2016 GH_{250}	—	October 30, 2005	Mount Lemmon	Mount Lemmon Survey	(5)	1.4 km	MPC · JPL
583468	2016 GJ_{250}	—	March 4, 2016	Haleakala	Pan-STARRS 1	·	1.0 km	MPC · JPL
583469	2016 GK_{250}	—	April 3, 2016	Haleakala	Pan-STARRS 1	ADE	1.4 km	MPC · JPL
583470	2016 GH_{251}	—	April 15, 2016	Haleakala	Pan-STARRS 1	PHO	940 m	MPC · JPL
583471	2016 GF_{255}	—	November 12, 2005	Kitt Peak	Spacewatch	·	1.2 km	MPC · JPL
583472	2016 GY_{255}	—	April 5, 2016	Haleakala	Pan-STARRS 1	·	1.1 km	MPC · JPL
583473	2016 GE_{257}	—	April 5, 2016	Haleakala	Pan-STARRS 1	·	760 m	MPC · JPL
583474	2016 GO_{257}	—	October 27, 2005	Catalina	CSS	·	1.4 km	MPC · JPL
583475	2016 GV_{257}	—	July 3, 2013	Oukaïmeden	M. Ory	(5)	1.1 km	MPC · JPL
583476	2016 GX_{257}	—	March 15, 2007	Mount Lemmon	Mount Lemmon Survey	·	1.4 km	MPC · JPL
583477	2016 GM_{260}	—	November 17, 2009	Mount Lemmon	Mount Lemmon Survey	(5)	1.1 km	MPC · JPL
583478	2016 GU_{260}	—	April 2, 2016	Haleakala	Pan-STARRS 1	MAR	810 m	MPC · JPL
583479	2016 GN_{261}	—	April 24, 2012	Mount Lemmon	Mount Lemmon Survey	·	1.1 km	MPC · JPL
583480	2016 GD_{262}	—	April 1, 2016	Haleakala	Pan-STARRS 1	·	1.3 km	MPC · JPL
583481	2016 GQ_{262}	—	December 3, 2014	Haleakala	Pan-STARRS 1	·	1.3 km	MPC · JPL
583482	2016 GB_{263}	—	September 3, 2013	Haleakala	Pan-STARRS 1	·	990 m	MPC · JPL
583483	2016 GL_{263}	—	February 25, 2011	Kitt Peak	Spacewatch	·	1.4 km	MPC · JPL
583484	2016 GH_{264}	—	April 22, 2007	Mount Lemmon	Mount Lemmon Survey	·	1.7 km	MPC · JPL
583485	2016 GT_{264}	—	April 19, 2012	Mount Lemmon	Mount Lemmon Survey	·	1.1 km	MPC · JPL
583486	2016 GO_{265}	—	April 25, 2012	Mount Lemmon	Mount Lemmon Survey	·	1.2 km	MPC · JPL
583487	2016 GW_{265}	—	May 12, 2012	Haleakala	Pan-STARRS 1	·	1.3 km	MPC · JPL
583488	2016 GC_{266}	—	January 25, 2015	Haleakala	Pan-STARRS 1	MAR	830 m	MPC · JPL
583489	2016 GH_{266}	—	April 11, 2016	Haleakala	Pan-STARRS 1	·	1.6 km	MPC · JPL
583490	2016 GT_{266}	—	November 21, 2014	Haleakala	Pan-STARRS 1	·	1.1 km	MPC · JPL
583491	2016 GJ_{267}	—	March 11, 2011	Kitt Peak	Spacewatch	·	2.0 km	MPC · JPL
583492	2016 GK_{267}	—	January 14, 2015	Haleakala	Pan-STARRS 1	·	920 m	MPC · JPL
583493	2016 GD_{268}	—	July 25, 2008	Mount Lemmon	Mount Lemmon Survey	·	1.6 km	MPC · JPL
583494	2016 GG_{268}	—	April 3, 2016	Haleakala	Pan-STARRS 1	·	1 km	MPC · JPL
583495	2016 GT_{269}	—	April 10, 2016	Haleakala	Pan-STARRS 1	·	2.8 km	MPC · JPL
583496	2016 GW_{271}	—	April 1, 2016	Haleakala	Pan-STARRS 1	·	940 m	MPC · JPL
583497	2016 GD_{276}	—	April 11, 2016	Haleakala	Pan-STARRS 1	·	1.5 km	MPC · JPL
583498	2016 GE_{277}	—	April 14, 2016	Haleakala	Pan-STARRS 1	·	1.4 km	MPC · JPL
583499	2016 GY_{277}	—	January 16, 2015	Haleakala	Pan-STARRS 1	WIT	760 m	MPC · JPL
583500	2016 GP_{280}	—	April 4, 2016	Haleakala	Pan-STARRS 1	·	1.2 km	MPC · JPL

== 583501–583600 ==
back to top

Designation			Discovery			Properties		Ref
Permanent	Provisional	Named after	Date	Site	Discoverer(s)	Category	Diam.	Ref
583501	2016 GV_{280}	—	April 5, 2016	Haleakala	Pan-STARRS 1	MAR	780 m	MPC · JPL
583502	2016 GN_{282}	—	April 4, 2016	Haleakala	Pan-STARRS 1	EUN	990 m	MPC · JPL
583503	2016 GY_{284}	—	April 15, 2016	Mount Lemmon	Mount Lemmon Survey	·	1.6 km	MPC · JPL
583504	2016 GO_{298}	—	April 3, 2010	WISE	WISE	·	2.1 km	MPC · JPL
583505	2016 GK_{299}	—	December 29, 2014	Haleakala	Pan-STARRS 1	·	1.4 km	MPC · JPL
583506	2016 HG_{2}	—	March 16, 2016	Haleakala	Pan-STARRS 1	·	1.6 km	MPC · JPL
583507	2016 HV_{2}	—	August 28, 2005	Kitt Peak	Spacewatch	·	2.2 km	MPC · JPL
583508	2016 HP_{4}	—	March 11, 2016	Haleakala	Pan-STARRS 1	·	1.0 km	MPC · JPL
583509	2016 HQ_{4}	—	May 12, 2012	Mount Lemmon	Mount Lemmon Survey	·	1.1 km	MPC · JPL
583510	2016 HN_{5}	—	March 9, 2003	Palomar	NEAT	JUN	1.1 km	MPC · JPL
583511	2016 HW_{5}	—	February 14, 2016	Haleakala	Pan-STARRS 1	·	1.4 km	MPC · JPL
583512	2016 HY_{5}	—	April 27, 2016	Mount Lemmon	Mount Lemmon Survey	·	2.4 km	MPC · JPL
583513	2016 HD_{6}	—	March 13, 2016	Haleakala	Pan-STARRS 1	MAR	1.2 km	MPC · JPL
583514	2016 HX_{6}	—	December 23, 2014	Mount Lemmon	Mount Lemmon Survey	(5)	970 m	MPC · JPL
583515	2016 HY_{6}	—	August 21, 2008	Kitt Peak	Spacewatch	·	1.6 km	MPC · JPL
583516	2016 HD_{7}	—	April 14, 2007	Kitt Peak	Spacewatch	·	1.7 km	MPC · JPL
583517	2016 HP_{9}	—	March 13, 2011	Mount Lemmon	Mount Lemmon Survey	·	1.7 km	MPC · JPL
583518	2016 HN_{13}	—	October 15, 2004	Mount Lemmon	Mount Lemmon Survey	HOF	2.3 km	MPC · JPL
583519	2016 HP_{15}	—	December 26, 2014	Haleakala	Pan-STARRS 1	AGN	950 m	MPC · JPL
583520	2016 HZ_{15}	—	October 3, 2013	Haleakala	Pan-STARRS 1	·	1.5 km	MPC · JPL
583521	2016 HB_{16}	—	September 24, 1995	Kitt Peak	Spacewatch	·	1.8 km	MPC · JPL
583522	2016 HH_{16}	—	October 1, 2005	Mount Lemmon	Mount Lemmon Survey	·	1.3 km	MPC · JPL
583523	2016 HT_{16}	—	April 30, 2016	Haleakala	Pan-STARRS 1	·	1.3 km	MPC · JPL
583524	2016 HD_{18}	—	October 18, 2009	Mount Lemmon	Mount Lemmon Survey	·	940 m	MPC · JPL
583525	2016 HE_{18}	—	January 30, 2011	Mount Lemmon	Mount Lemmon Survey	MIS	2.2 km	MPC · JPL
583526	2016 HX_{18}	—	January 16, 2015	Haleakala	Pan-STARRS 1	·	1.5 km	MPC · JPL
583527	2016 HU_{20}	—	November 17, 2014	Haleakala	Pan-STARRS 1	·	1.3 km	MPC · JPL
583528	2016 HV_{21}	—	August 13, 2008	La Sagra	OAM	·	1.8 km	MPC · JPL
583529	2016 HJ_{22}	—	June 1, 2013	Haleakala	Pan-STARRS 1	·	780 m	MPC · JPL
583530	2016 HM_{22}	—	October 26, 2009	Kitt Peak	Spacewatch	·	1.7 km	MPC · JPL
583531	2016 HK_{23}	—	July 1, 2013	Haleakala	Pan-STARRS 1	PHO	690 m	MPC · JPL
583532	2016 HW_{23}	—	September 13, 2004	Palomar	NEAT	·	2.3 km	MPC · JPL
583533	2016 HF_{24}	—	February 2, 2013	Haleakala	Pan-STARRS 1	H	440 m	MPC · JPL
583534	2016 HV_{25}	—	September 1, 2005	Palomar	NEAT	EUN	1.7 km	MPC · JPL
583535	2016 HZ_{25}	—	April 28, 2016	Mount Lemmon	Mount Lemmon Survey	EUN	920 m	MPC · JPL
583536	2016 HL_{29}	—	April 27, 2016	Haleakala	Pan-STARRS 1	·	1.6 km	MPC · JPL
583537	2016 HV_{32}	—	January 14, 2015	Haleakala	Pan-STARRS 1	EOS	1.3 km	MPC · JPL
583538	2016 JK_{2}	—	March 31, 2016	Haleakala	Pan-STARRS 1	GEF	950 m	MPC · JPL
583539	2016 JB_{5}	—	January 17, 2015	Haleakala	Pan-STARRS 1	·	1.3 km	MPC · JPL
583540	2016 JY_{7}	—	April 4, 2003	Kitt Peak	Spacewatch	·	1.2 km	MPC · JPL
583541	2016 JL_{8}	—	March 6, 2016	Haleakala	Pan-STARRS 1	EUN	940 m	MPC · JPL
583542	2016 JO_{8}	—	May 21, 2012	Mount Lemmon	Mount Lemmon Survey	·	1.6 km	MPC · JPL
583543	2016 JV_{8}	—	December 26, 2014	Haleakala	Pan-STARRS 1	ADE	1.9 km	MPC · JPL
583544	2016 JY_{10}	—	March 9, 2011	Mount Lemmon	Mount Lemmon Survey	·	1.4 km	MPC · JPL
583545	2016 JZ_{10}	—	March 6, 2011	Mount Lemmon	Mount Lemmon Survey	·	1.4 km	MPC · JPL
583546	2016 JY_{11}	—	April 22, 2011	Haleakala	Pan-STARRS 1	H	500 m	MPC · JPL
583547	2016 JB_{13}	—	December 26, 2014	Haleakala	Pan-STARRS 1	·	1.5 km	MPC · JPL
583548	2016 JM_{14}	—	July 29, 2008	Kitt Peak	Spacewatch	·	1.6 km	MPC · JPL
583549	2016 JT_{14}	—	April 24, 2003	Bergisch Gladbach	W. Bickel	·	1.6 km	MPC · JPL
583550	2016 JF_{16}	—	October 24, 2013	Mount Lemmon	Mount Lemmon Survey	·	1.7 km	MPC · JPL
583551	2016 JW_{18}	—	June 25, 2003	Palomar	NEAT	·	2.4 km	MPC · JPL
583552	2016 JZ_{18}	—	March 6, 2016	Haleakala	Pan-STARRS 1	·	1.5 km	MPC · JPL
583553	2016 JT_{19}	—	May 4, 2009	Mount Lemmon	Mount Lemmon Survey	·	620 m	MPC · JPL
583554	2016 JB_{21}	—	April 18, 2007	Mount Lemmon	Mount Lemmon Survey	·	1.5 km	MPC · JPL
583555	2016 JK_{21}	—	January 14, 2012	Les Engarouines	L. Bernasconi	·	540 m	MPC · JPL
583556	2016 JJ_{22}	—	October 30, 2010	Kitt Peak	Spacewatch	L4	8.3 km	MPC · JPL
583557	2016 JP_{23}	—	October 7, 1996	Kitt Peak	Spacewatch	·	1.8 km	MPC · JPL
583558	2016 JU_{23}	—	March 13, 2007	Mount Lemmon	Mount Lemmon Survey	·	1.3 km	MPC · JPL
583559	2016 JO_{24}	—	November 22, 2014	Mount Lemmon	Mount Lemmon Survey	H	310 m	MPC · JPL
583560	2016 JD_{25}	—	December 4, 2005	Kitt Peak	Spacewatch	·	1.4 km	MPC · JPL
583561	2016 JH_{25}	—	July 16, 2013	Haleakala	Pan-STARRS 1	EUN	1.4 km	MPC · JPL
583562	2016 JL_{25}	—	November 17, 2014	Haleakala	Pan-STARRS 1	·	1.1 km	MPC · JPL
583563	2016 JH_{26}	—	December 29, 2014	Haleakala	Pan-STARRS 1	·	2.8 km	MPC · JPL
583564	2016 JH_{27}	—	April 8, 2008	Mount Lemmon	Mount Lemmon Survey	·	1.3 km	MPC · JPL
583565	2016 JA_{28}	—	February 27, 2009	Kitt Peak	Spacewatch	·	520 m	MPC · JPL
583566	2016 JC_{30}	—	March 3, 2003	Palomar	NEAT	·	1.8 km	MPC · JPL
583567	2016 JG_{30}	—	July 28, 2005	Palomar	NEAT	·	2.3 km	MPC · JPL
583568	2016 JA_{31}	—	February 12, 2016	Haleakala	Pan-STARRS 1	·	1.5 km	MPC · JPL
583569	2016 JF_{31}	—	November 29, 2014	Mount Lemmon	Mount Lemmon Survey	EUN	1.4 km	MPC · JPL
583570	2016 JN_{31}	—	May 29, 2003	Kitt Peak	Spacewatch	·	2.1 km	MPC · JPL
583571	2016 JT_{31}	—	March 26, 2003	Kitt Peak	Spacewatch	·	1.2 km	MPC · JPL
583572	2016 JX_{34}	—	June 7, 2008	Catalina	CSS	·	2.1 km	MPC · JPL
583573	2016 JM_{35}	—	December 20, 2014	Kitt Peak	Spacewatch	·	1.8 km	MPC · JPL
583574	2016 JT_{35}	—	March 30, 2011	Haleakala	Pan-STARRS 1	·	1.6 km	MPC · JPL
583575	2016 JL_{36}	—	February 10, 2016	Haleakala	Pan-STARRS 1	·	1.6 km	MPC · JPL
583576	2016 JQ_{36}	—	October 30, 2005	Kitt Peak	Spacewatch	·	2.0 km	MPC · JPL
583577	2016 JP_{40}	—	April 25, 2007	Mount Lemmon	Mount Lemmon Survey	·	1.9 km	MPC · JPL
583578	2016 JQ_{40}	—	May 15, 2012	Mount Lemmon	Mount Lemmon Survey	·	1.3 km	MPC · JPL
583579	2016 JQ_{41}	—	February 21, 2007	Kitt Peak	Spacewatch	EUN	930 m	MPC · JPL
583580	2016 JF_{45}	—	May 4, 2016	Haleakala	Pan-STARRS 1	MAR	880 m	MPC · JPL
583581	2016 JG_{45}	—	May 2, 2016	Haleakala	Pan-STARRS 1	·	1.4 km	MPC · JPL
583582	2016 JW_{48}	—	May 3, 2016	Mount Lemmon	Mount Lemmon Survey	·	1.4 km	MPC · JPL
583583	2016 JW_{50}	—	May 9, 2016	Kitt Peak	Spacewatch	·	2.8 km	MPC · JPL
583584	2016 KT	—	September 16, 2009	Mount Lemmon	Mount Lemmon Survey	H	350 m	MPC · JPL
583585	2016 KA_{2}	—	October 1, 2003	Kitt Peak	Spacewatch	·	1.5 km	MPC · JPL
583586	2016 KN_{2}	—	July 16, 2002	Palomar	NEAT	·	2.9 km	MPC · JPL
583587	2016 KR_{2}	—	May 2, 2016	Haleakala	Pan-STARRS 1	EUN	1.3 km	MPC · JPL
583588	2016 KD_{5}	—	March 14, 2011	Mount Lemmon	Mount Lemmon Survey	EUN	880 m	MPC · JPL
583589	2016 KU_{5}	—	September 6, 2012	Mount Lemmon	Mount Lemmon Survey	·	1.6 km	MPC · JPL
583590	2016 KB_{6}	—	September 5, 2008	Kitt Peak	Spacewatch	·	1.3 km	MPC · JPL
583591	2016 KA_{8}	—	April 3, 2016	Haleakala	Pan-STARRS 1	(5)	1.1 km	MPC · JPL
583592	2016 KV_{8}	—	November 17, 2009	Mount Lemmon	Mount Lemmon Survey	·	1.5 km	MPC · JPL
583593	2016 KF_{10}	—	May 30, 2016	Haleakala	Pan-STARRS 1	ADE	1.8 km	MPC · JPL
583594	2016 KO_{12}	—	May 16, 2016	Haleakala	Pan-STARRS 1	·	2.2 km	MPC · JPL
583595	2016 LP_{2}	—	April 3, 2016	Haleakala	Pan-STARRS 1	·	1.5 km	MPC · JPL
583596	2016 LQ_{2}	—	May 29, 2012	Mount Lemmon	Mount Lemmon Survey	MAR	900 m	MPC · JPL
583597	2016 LV_{5}	—	March 5, 2016	Haleakala	Pan-STARRS 1	·	2.5 km	MPC · JPL
583598	2016 LW_{5}	—	August 23, 2004	Kitt Peak	Spacewatch	·	1.2 km	MPC · JPL
583599	2016 LO_{7}	—	January 29, 2015	Haleakala	Pan-STARRS 1	MAR	1.1 km	MPC · JPL
583600	2016 LG_{12}	—	October 8, 2008	Mount Lemmon	Mount Lemmon Survey	JUN	840 m	MPC · JPL

== 583601–583700 ==
back to top

Designation			Discovery			Properties		Ref
Permanent	Provisional	Named after	Date	Site	Discoverer(s)	Category	Diam.	Ref
583601	2016 LO_{12}	—	March 7, 2016	Haleakala	Pan-STARRS 1	·	1.3 km	MPC · JPL
583602	2016 LN_{14}	—	January 21, 2015	Haleakala	Pan-STARRS 1	·	1.5 km	MPC · JPL
583603	2016 LB_{15}	—	February 5, 2011	Mount Lemmon	Mount Lemmon Survey	MAR	750 m	MPC · JPL
583604	2016 LU_{16}	—	December 8, 2010	Mount Lemmon	Mount Lemmon Survey	·	1.2 km	MPC · JPL
583605	2016 LP_{17}	—	June 5, 2016	Haleakala	Pan-STARRS 1	·	1.2 km	MPC · JPL
583606	2016 LO_{20}	—	February 9, 2011	Catalina	CSS	JUN	940 m	MPC · JPL
583607	2016 LF_{22}	—	January 20, 2015	Kitt Peak	Spacewatch	WIT	780 m	MPC · JPL
583608	2016 LH_{22}	—	May 30, 2016	Haleakala	Pan-STARRS 1	·	890 m	MPC · JPL
583609	2016 LO_{22}	—	May 2, 2016	Haleakala	Pan-STARRS 1	·	1.6 km	MPC · JPL
583610	2016 LF_{23}	—	September 14, 2007	Mount Lemmon	Mount Lemmon Survey	·	2.5 km	MPC · JPL
583611	2016 LM_{23}	—	January 23, 2006	Kitt Peak	Spacewatch	·	1.2 km	MPC · JPL
583612	2016 LN_{23}	—	December 30, 2014	Haleakala	Pan-STARRS 1	·	1.4 km	MPC · JPL
583613	2016 LA_{24}	—	January 13, 2011	Kitt Peak	Spacewatch	·	1.4 km	MPC · JPL
583614	2016 LZ_{25}	—	May 10, 2007	Mount Lemmon	Mount Lemmon Survey	·	1.8 km	MPC · JPL
583615	2016 LZ_{26}	—	September 29, 2010	Mount Lemmon	Mount Lemmon Survey	3:2	4.6 km	MPC · JPL
583616	2016 LF_{27}	—	October 4, 2004	Kitt Peak	Spacewatch	·	1.7 km	MPC · JPL
583617	2016 LR_{27}	—	May 6, 2011	Kitt Peak	Spacewatch	·	1.7 km	MPC · JPL
583618	2016 LZ_{27}	—	October 3, 2013	Haleakala	Pan-STARRS 1	·	1.1 km	MPC · JPL
583619	2016 LR_{30}	—	August 13, 2012	Siding Spring	SSS	·	1.6 km	MPC · JPL
583620	2016 LQ_{32}	—	May 21, 2006	Kitt Peak	Spacewatch	·	2.2 km	MPC · JPL
583621	2016 LN_{35}	—	February 17, 2015	Haleakala	Pan-STARRS 1	·	1.2 km	MPC · JPL
583622	2016 LY_{35}	—	June 5, 2016	Haleakala	Pan-STARRS 1	·	1.1 km	MPC · JPL
583623	2016 LW_{36}	—	January 30, 2011	Kitt Peak	Spacewatch	·	1.0 km	MPC · JPL
583624	2016 LZ_{36}	—	June 5, 2016	Haleakala	Pan-STARRS 1	ADE	1.3 km	MPC · JPL
583625	2016 LP_{37}	—	October 20, 2012	Haleakala	Pan-STARRS 1	·	1.8 km	MPC · JPL
583626	2016 LK_{38}	—	February 16, 2015	Haleakala	Pan-STARRS 1	PAD	1.2 km	MPC · JPL
583627	2016 LL_{38}	—	February 12, 2011	Mount Lemmon	Mount Lemmon Survey	·	1.3 km	MPC · JPL
583628	2016 LC_{39}	—	May 30, 2016	Haleakala	Pan-STARRS 1	·	1.5 km	MPC · JPL
583629	2016 LE_{39}	—	June 5, 2016	Haleakala	Pan-STARRS 1	·	1.3 km	MPC · JPL
583630	2016 LG_{39}	—	January 27, 2015	Haleakala	Pan-STARRS 1	·	1.8 km	MPC · JPL
583631	2016 LJ_{39}	—	February 13, 2015	XuYi	PMO NEO Survey Program	HOF	2.4 km	MPC · JPL
583632	2016 LN_{41}	—	June 5, 2016	Haleakala	Pan-STARRS 1	HNS	840 m	MPC · JPL
583633	2016 LX_{41}	—	May 27, 2012	Mount Lemmon	Mount Lemmon Survey	EUN	1.1 km	MPC · JPL
583634	2016 LL_{42}	—	October 22, 2012	Mount Lemmon	Mount Lemmon Survey	·	1.6 km	MPC · JPL
583635	2016 LX_{42}	—	June 5, 2016	Haleakala	Pan-STARRS 1	·	1.8 km	MPC · JPL
583636	2016 LX_{43}	—	June 7, 2016	Mount Lemmon	Mount Lemmon Survey	·	620 m	MPC · JPL
583637	2016 LA_{44}	—	September 10, 2012	Črni Vrh	Matičič, S.	·	1.5 km	MPC · JPL
583638	2016 LO_{45}	—	November 22, 2008	Kitt Peak	Spacewatch	·	2.4 km	MPC · JPL
583639	2016 LM_{46}	—	May 10, 2007	Mount Lemmon	Mount Lemmon Survey	·	1.7 km	MPC · JPL
583640	2016 LR_{46}	—	April 24, 2012	Mount Lemmon	Mount Lemmon Survey	·	1.2 km	MPC · JPL
583641	2016 LU_{46}	—	April 1, 2016	Haleakala	Pan-STARRS 1	·	1.2 km	MPC · JPL
583642	2016 LW_{46}	—	May 5, 2016	Haleakala	Pan-STARRS 1	·	1.8 km	MPC · JPL
583643	2016 LX_{46}	—	February 5, 2016	Haleakala	Pan-STARRS 1	·	1.8 km	MPC · JPL
583644	2016 LZ_{46}	—	April 27, 2012	Mount Lemmon	Mount Lemmon Survey	·	1.1 km	MPC · JPL
583645	2016 LR_{50}	—	November 22, 2006	Mount Lemmon	Mount Lemmon Survey	·	3.8 km	MPC · JPL
583646	2016 LR_{52}	—	June 8, 2016	Mount Lemmon	Mount Lemmon Survey	H	460 m	MPC · JPL
583647	2016 LA_{56}	—	April 19, 2015	Mount Lemmon	Mount Lemmon Survey	·	1.5 km	MPC · JPL
583648	2016 LR_{56}	—	June 5, 2011	Mount Lemmon	Mount Lemmon Survey	·	1.8 km	MPC · JPL
583649	2016 LT_{56}	—	April 14, 2007	Mount Lemmon	Mount Lemmon Survey	·	1.5 km	MPC · JPL
583650	2016 LF_{57}	—	March 11, 2015	Kitt Peak	Spacewatch	·	1.6 km	MPC · JPL
583651	2016 LH_{57}	—	March 17, 2015	Haleakala	Pan-STARRS 1	·	1.7 km	MPC · JPL
583652	2016 LJ_{58}	—	April 25, 2015	Haleakala	Pan-STARRS 1	URS	2.3 km	MPC · JPL
583653	2016 LZ_{58}	—	May 16, 2007	Mount Lemmon	Mount Lemmon Survey	·	1.6 km	MPC · JPL
583654	2016 LO_{59}	—	January 29, 2011	Kitt Peak	Spacewatch	·	1.6 km	MPC · JPL
583655	2016 LR_{60}	—	September 30, 2005	Palomar	NEAT	TIR	2.4 km	MPC · JPL
583656	2016 LD_{62}	—	June 7, 2016	Haleakala	Pan-STARRS 1	EOS	1.4 km	MPC · JPL
583657	2016 LN_{62}	—	April 25, 2015	Haleakala	Pan-STARRS 1	·	1.4 km	MPC · JPL
583658	2016 LU_{62}	—	January 22, 2015	Haleakala	Pan-STARRS 1	·	2.0 km	MPC · JPL
583659	2016 LQ_{65}	—	October 30, 2005	Mount Lemmon	Mount Lemmon Survey	·	2.2 km	MPC · JPL
583660	2016 LU_{65}	—	November 24, 2009	Kitt Peak	Spacewatch	·	2.3 km	MPC · JPL
583661	2016 LW_{66}	—	March 28, 2011	Mount Lemmon	Mount Lemmon Survey	·	1.8 km	MPC · JPL
583662	2016 LO_{68}	—	June 5, 2016	Haleakala	Pan-STARRS 1	·	2.6 km	MPC · JPL
583663	2016 LK_{69}	—	June 18, 2005	Mount Lemmon	Mount Lemmon Survey	·	2.4 km	MPC · JPL
583664	2016 LC_{70}	—	June 8, 2016	Mount Lemmon	Mount Lemmon Survey	·	1.5 km	MPC · JPL
583665	2016 LQ_{70}	—	June 7, 2016	Haleakala	Pan-STARRS 1	·	2.7 km	MPC · JPL
583666	2016 LK_{77}	—	June 8, 2016	Mount Lemmon	Mount Lemmon Survey	H	410 m	MPC · JPL
583667	2016 LS_{83}	—	June 8, 2016	Haleakala	Pan-STARRS 1	·	1.5 km	MPC · JPL
583668	2016 LE_{86}	—	January 22, 2015	Haleakala	Pan-STARRS 1	EOS	1.2 km	MPC · JPL
583669	2016 MD_{1}	—	October 2, 2006	Mount Lemmon	Mount Lemmon Survey	·	460 m	MPC · JPL
583670	2016 MV_{2}	—	December 29, 2014	Haleakala	Pan-STARRS 1	·	1.8 km	MPC · JPL
583671	2016 MQ_{3}	—	December 22, 2006	Mount Lemmon	Mount Lemmon Survey	·	2.8 km	MPC · JPL
583672	2016 MS_{3}	—	June 12, 2016	Mount Lemmon	Mount Lemmon Survey	EUN	1 km	MPC · JPL
583673	2016 MU_{5}	—	June 16, 2016	Haleakala	Pan-STARRS 1	EOS	1.8 km	MPC · JPL
583674	2016 MY_{5}	—	October 8, 2012	Haleakala	Pan-STARRS 1	(13314)	1.7 km	MPC · JPL
583675	2016 MF_{6}	—	January 26, 2014	Calar Alto-CASADO	Mottola, S., Hellmich, S.	VER	2.5 km	MPC · JPL
583676	2016 NX_{1}	—	July 3, 2005	Mount Lemmon	Mount Lemmon Survey	TIR	3.2 km	MPC · JPL
583677	2016 ND_{2}	—	December 17, 2014	Haleakala	Pan-STARRS 1	H	510 m	MPC · JPL
583678	2016 NS_{2}	—	August 19, 2012	Siding Spring	SSS	·	2.7 km	MPC · JPL
583679	2016 NC_{3}	—	February 6, 2002	Kitt Peak	Deep Ecliptic Survey	·	1.8 km	MPC · JPL
583680	2016 NE_{3}	—	November 12, 2012	Mount Lemmon	Mount Lemmon Survey	·	1.3 km	MPC · JPL
583681	2016 NR_{4}	—	March 10, 2005	Mount Lemmon	Mount Lemmon Survey	·	1.9 km	MPC · JPL
583682	2016 NS_{5}	—	September 25, 2011	Haleakala	Pan-STARRS 1	·	3.0 km	MPC · JPL
583683	2016 NF_{7}	—	July 30, 2005	Palomar	NEAT	·	3.1 km	MPC · JPL
583684	2016 NX_{9}	—	November 23, 2012	Nogales	M. Schwartz, P. R. Holvorcem	·	2.1 km	MPC · JPL
583685	2016 NM_{10}	—	November 27, 2006	Kitt Peak	Spacewatch	·	2.5 km	MPC · JPL
583686	2016 NH_{13}	—	February 23, 2015	Haleakala	Pan-STARRS 1	·	2.3 km	MPC · JPL
583687	2016 NX_{14}	—	August 11, 2012	Haleakala	Pan-STARRS 1	·	1.4 km	MPC · JPL
583688	2016 NZ_{16}	—	May 24, 2006	Bergisch Gladbach	W. Bickel	·	670 m	MPC · JPL
583689	2016 NX_{19}	—	April 13, 2015	Haleakala	Pan-STARRS 1	·	2.9 km	MPC · JPL
583690	2016 NH_{23}	—	June 21, 2007	Kitt Peak	Spacewatch	·	1.9 km	MPC · JPL
583691	2016 NF_{24}	—	September 16, 2012	Kitt Peak	Spacewatch	·	1.9 km	MPC · JPL
583692	2016 NV_{24}	—	August 2, 2011	Haleakala	Pan-STARRS 1	·	1.3 km	MPC · JPL
583693	2016 NL_{25}	—	July 8, 2016	Haleakala	Pan-STARRS 1	EUP	2.8 km	MPC · JPL
583694	2016 NS_{31}	—	July 20, 2001	Palomar	NEAT	·	2.3 km	MPC · JPL
583695	2016 NB_{33}	—	August 27, 2003	Palomar	NEAT	H	510 m	MPC · JPL
583696	2016 NP_{33}	—	January 9, 2014	Haleakala	Pan-STARRS 1	·	2.3 km	MPC · JPL
583697	2016 NX_{34}	—	September 29, 2005	Kitt Peak	Spacewatch	·	830 m	MPC · JPL
583698	2016 NP_{36}	—	February 18, 2015	Haleakala	Pan-STARRS 1	BRA	1.3 km	MPC · JPL
583699	2016 NT_{40}	—	July 3, 2016	Mount Lemmon	Mount Lemmon Survey	·	1.9 km	MPC · JPL
583700	2016 NH_{41}	—	January 30, 2009	Mount Lemmon	Mount Lemmon Survey	KOR	1.1 km	MPC · JPL

== 583701–583800 ==
back to top

Designation			Discovery			Properties		Ref
Permanent	Provisional	Named after	Date	Site	Discoverer(s)	Category	Diam.	Ref
583701	2016 NR_{42}	—	June 7, 2016	Haleakala	Pan-STARRS 1	H	470 m	MPC · JPL
583702	2016 NH_{43}	—	January 15, 2015	Haleakala	Pan-STARRS 1	H	420 m	MPC · JPL
583703	2016 NX_{43}	—	March 13, 2012	Kitt Peak	Spacewatch	·	650 m	MPC · JPL
583704	2016 NZ_{43}	—	July 12, 2016	Mount Lemmon	Mount Lemmon Survey	·	2.5 km	MPC · JPL
583705	2016 NK_{44}	—	July 12, 2016	Mount Lemmon	Mount Lemmon Survey	·	1.0 km	MPC · JPL
583706	2016 NQ_{48}	—	July 4, 2016	Haleakala	Pan-STARRS 1	V	530 m	MPC · JPL
583707	2016 NS_{48}	—	March 21, 2015	Haleakala	Pan-STARRS 1	·	1.2 km	MPC · JPL
583708	2016 NM_{49}	—	February 7, 2002	Socorro	LINEAR	H	410 m	MPC · JPL
583709	2016 NK_{50}	—	November 20, 2003	Apache Point	SDSS Collaboration	·	600 m	MPC · JPL
583710	2016 NF_{51}	—	October 19, 2011	Kitt Peak	Spacewatch	·	1.9 km	MPC · JPL
583711	2016 NS_{51}	—	July 13, 2016	Haleakala	Pan-STARRS 1	EOS	1.7 km	MPC · JPL
583712	2016 NX_{52}	—	April 11, 2015	Mount Lemmon	Mount Lemmon Survey	HYG	2.5 km	MPC · JPL
583713	2016 ND_{53}	—	July 13, 2016	Haleakala	Pan-STARRS 1	KOR	1 km	MPC · JPL
583714	2016 NH_{53}	—	July 13, 2016	Mount Lemmon	Mount Lemmon Survey	·	1.4 km	MPC · JPL
583715	2016 NB_{54}	—	October 25, 2011	Haleakala	Pan-STARRS 1	·	2.3 km	MPC · JPL
583716	2016 NY_{56}	—	December 12, 2014	Haleakala	Pan-STARRS 1	H	390 m	MPC · JPL
583717	2016 NB_{57}	—	January 20, 2015	Haleakala	Pan-STARRS 1	H	350 m	MPC · JPL
583718	2016 NL_{57}	—	January 28, 2015	Haleakala	Pan-STARRS 1	H	340 m	MPC · JPL
583719	2016 NL_{66}	—	August 19, 2006	Kitt Peak	Spacewatch	·	1.3 km	MPC · JPL
583720	2016 NW_{66}	—	July 9, 2015	Haleakala	Pan-STARRS 1	·	2.6 km	MPC · JPL
583721	2016 NK_{67}	—	November 27, 2006	Mount Lemmon	Mount Lemmon Survey	LIX	3.0 km	MPC · JPL
583722	2016 NM_{67}	—	May 21, 2015	Haleakala	Pan-STARRS 1	EOS	1.4 km	MPC · JPL
583723	2016 NE_{68}	—	July 5, 2016	Mount Lemmon	Mount Lemmon Survey	·	1.8 km	MPC · JPL
583724	2016 NQ_{69}	—	February 20, 2009	Dauban	C. Rinner, Kugel, F.	·	2.6 km	MPC · JPL
583725	2016 NW_{69}	—	January 13, 2008	Kitt Peak	Spacewatch	EOS	1.6 km	MPC · JPL
583726	2016 NF_{70}	—	July 11, 2016	Haleakala	Pan-STARRS 1	EOS	1.6 km	MPC · JPL
583727	2016 NH_{70}	—	February 9, 2008	Mount Lemmon	Mount Lemmon Survey	·	2.4 km	MPC · JPL
583728	2016 NQ_{70}	—	September 2, 2011	Charleston	R. Holmes	·	2.6 km	MPC · JPL
583729 Tejfel	2016 NR_{70}	Tejfel	October 21, 2011	Zelenchukskaya Stn	T. V. Krjačko, Satovski, B.	·	2.6 km	MPC · JPL
583730	2016 NN_{72}	—	February 26, 2014	Haleakala	Pan-STARRS 1	EOS	1.6 km	MPC · JPL
583731	2016 NC_{74}	—	July 7, 2016	Haleakala	Pan-STARRS 1	·	1.7 km	MPC · JPL
583732	2016 NQ_{74}	—	October 18, 2011	Kitt Peak	Spacewatch	·	2.7 km	MPC · JPL
583733	2016 NH_{75}	—	October 20, 2006	Kitt Peak	Spacewatch	THM	1.5 km	MPC · JPL
583734	2016 NN_{75}	—	October 7, 2005	Mauna Kea	A. Boattini	·	2.1 km	MPC · JPL
583735	2016 NW_{75}	—	April 1, 2003	Apache Point	SDSS Collaboration	·	3.0 km	MPC · JPL
583736	2016 NA_{77}	—	January 28, 2015	Haleakala	Pan-STARRS 1	BRA	1.2 km	MPC · JPL
583737	2016 NU_{77}	—	July 5, 2016	Haleakala	Pan-STARRS 1	·	1.7 km	MPC · JPL
583738	2016 NW_{77}	—	July 5, 2016	Haleakala	Pan-STARRS 1	EOS	1.4 km	MPC · JPL
583739	2016 NK_{78}	—	April 23, 2015	Haleakala	Pan-STARRS 1	EOS	1.2 km	MPC · JPL
583740	2016 NL_{78}	—	September 18, 2011	Mount Lemmon	Mount Lemmon Survey	·	2.1 km	MPC · JPL
583741	2016 NJ_{79}	—	August 29, 2011	Piszkéstető	K. Sárneczky	EOS	2.1 km	MPC · JPL
583742	2016 NK_{79}	—	August 31, 2005	Palomar	NEAT	TIR	3.4 km	MPC · JPL
583743	2016 NY_{79}	—	August 6, 2005	Palomar	NEAT	·	3.4 km	MPC · JPL
583744	2016 NK_{81}	—	April 24, 2015	Haleakala	Pan-STARRS 1	·	1.9 km	MPC · JPL
583745	2016 NB_{84}	—	September 4, 2011	Kitt Peak	Spacewatch	·	1.8 km	MPC · JPL
583746	2016 NO_{87}	—	July 13, 2016	Haleakala	Pan-STARRS 1	·	2.4 km	MPC · JPL
583747	2016 NQ_{87}	—	January 10, 2013	Haleakala	Pan-STARRS 1	·	2.4 km	MPC · JPL
583748	2016 NJ_{89}	—	April 24, 2015	Haleakala	Pan-STARRS 1	·	1.4 km	MPC · JPL
583749	2016 NY_{89}	—	September 24, 2011	Haleakala	Pan-STARRS 1	EOS	1.4 km	MPC · JPL
583750	2016 NT_{90}	—	July 13, 2016	Haleakala	Pan-STARRS 1	·	1.6 km	MPC · JPL
583751	2016 NZ_{90}	—	July 5, 2016	Haleakala	Pan-STARRS 1	twotino	154 km	MPC · JPL
583752	2016 NM_{103}	—	July 9, 2016	Haleakala	Pan-STARRS 1	·	2.9 km	MPC · JPL
583753	2016 NN_{103}	—	July 14, 2016	Haleakala	Pan-STARRS 1	V	440 m	MPC · JPL
583754	2016 NZ_{103}	—	July 8, 2016	Haleakala	Pan-STARRS 1	·	1.7 km	MPC · JPL
583755	2016 NT_{104}	—	July 11, 2016	Haleakala	Pan-STARRS 1	ELF	2.9 km	MPC · JPL
583756	2016 NQ_{108}	—	July 11, 2016	Haleakala	Pan-STARRS 1	·	2.4 km	MPC · JPL
583757	2016 NB_{109}	—	July 12, 2016	Haleakala	Pan-STARRS 1	·	1.5 km	MPC · JPL
583758	2016 NE_{110}	—	July 5, 2016	Haleakala	Pan-STARRS 1	·	2.2 km	MPC · JPL
583759	2016 NJ_{119}	—	July 7, 2016	Haleakala	Pan-STARRS 1	·	2.0 km	MPC · JPL
583760	2016 NE_{123}	—	July 7, 2016	Haleakala	Pan-STARRS 1	·	1.9 km	MPC · JPL
583761	2016 NK_{124}	—	July 7, 2016	Haleakala	Pan-STARRS 1	EOS	1.5 km	MPC · JPL
583762	2016 NO_{124}	—	July 4, 2016	Haleakala	Pan-STARRS 1	·	1.0 km	MPC · JPL
583763	2016 OU	—	December 15, 2006	Socorro	LINEAR	H	690 m	MPC · JPL
583764	2016 OA_{3}	—	March 13, 2007	Mount Lemmon	Mount Lemmon Survey	·	1.9 km	MPC · JPL
583765	2016 OC_{5}	—	November 11, 2007	Mount Lemmon	Mount Lemmon Survey	·	3.3 km	MPC · JPL
583766	2016 OM_{6}	—	May 15, 2015	Haleakala	Pan-STARRS 1	EOS	1.7 km	MPC · JPL
583767	2016 ON_{7}	—	July 31, 2005	Palomar	NEAT	·	1.9 km	MPC · JPL
583768	2016 OB_{8}	—	August 25, 2005	Palomar	NEAT	THB	3.6 km	MPC · JPL
583769	2016 OO_{8}	—	March 11, 2014	Mount Lemmon	Mount Lemmon Survey	·	2.7 km	MPC · JPL
583770	2016 OZ_{8}	—	September 10, 2007	Kitt Peak	Spacewatch	MRX	940 m	MPC · JPL
583771	2016 OQ_{10}	—	July 30, 2016	Haleakala	Pan-STARRS 1	·	2.8 km	MPC · JPL
583772	2016 PJ_{3}	—	October 26, 2012	Haleakala	Pan-STARRS 1	·	1.9 km	MPC · JPL
583773	2016 PB_{4}	—	March 6, 2014	Mount Lemmon	Mount Lemmon Survey	·	2.1 km	MPC · JPL
583774	2016 PO_{4}	—	April 25, 2015	Haleakala	Pan-STARRS 1	·	1.5 km	MPC · JPL
583775	2016 PC_{9}	—	September 18, 1995	Kitt Peak	Spacewatch	EOS	1.6 km	MPC · JPL
583776	2016 PF_{11}	—	August 18, 2009	Kitt Peak	Spacewatch	·	730 m	MPC · JPL
583777	2016 PY_{12}	—	May 10, 2015	Mount Lemmon	Mount Lemmon Survey	·	1.5 km	MPC · JPL
583778	2016 PX_{13}	—	November 16, 2006	Mount Lemmon	Mount Lemmon Survey	·	1.3 km	MPC · JPL
583779	2016 PU_{20}	—	December 31, 2013	Kitt Peak	Spacewatch	AGN	1.1 km	MPC · JPL
583780	2016 PJ_{21}	—	August 17, 2006	Palomar	NEAT	·	570 m	MPC · JPL
583781	2016 PW_{22}	—	March 19, 2009	Mount Lemmon	Mount Lemmon Survey	·	2.1 km	MPC · JPL
583782	2016 PJ_{24}	—	April 15, 2015	Mount Lemmon	Mount Lemmon Survey	·	990 m	MPC · JPL
583783	2016 PZ_{25}	—	August 2, 2016	Haleakala	Pan-STARRS 1	·	1.3 km	MPC · JPL
583784	2016 PS_{27}	—	October 18, 2006	Kitt Peak	Spacewatch	(21885)	2.8 km	MPC · JPL
583785	2016 PB_{28}	—	November 14, 2007	Mount Lemmon	Mount Lemmon Survey	·	1.6 km	MPC · JPL
583786	2016 PV_{28}	—	September 18, 2006	Kitt Peak	Spacewatch	·	2.5 km	MPC · JPL
583787	2016 PY_{28}	—	September 19, 2006	Catalina	CSS	EOS	2.2 km	MPC · JPL
583788	2016 PS_{29}	—	November 19, 2007	Mount Lemmon	Mount Lemmon Survey	·	1.9 km	MPC · JPL
583789	2016 PQ_{32}	—	January 29, 2014	Catalina	CSS	MAR	1.0 km	MPC · JPL
583790	2016 PD_{33}	—	June 12, 2015	Mount Lemmon	Mount Lemmon Survey	·	2.7 km	MPC · JPL
583791	2016 PB_{34}	—	February 26, 2014	Mount Lemmon	Mount Lemmon Survey	·	2.1 km	MPC · JPL
583792	2016 PS_{34}	—	October 12, 2007	Mount Lemmon	Mount Lemmon Survey	·	1.8 km	MPC · JPL
583793	2016 PM_{35}	—	July 4, 2016	Haleakala	Pan-STARRS 1	·	1.7 km	MPC · JPL
583794	2016 PP_{36}	—	April 15, 2015	Kitt Peak	Research and Education Collaborative Occultation Network	·	2.3 km	MPC · JPL
583795	2016 PL_{37}	—	February 23, 2015	Haleakala	Pan-STARRS 1	·	1.6 km	MPC · JPL
583796	2016 PC_{38}	—	February 13, 2010	Mount Lemmon	Mount Lemmon Survey	H	370 m	MPC · JPL
583797	2016 PM_{39}	—	June 25, 2011	Mount Lemmon	Mount Lemmon Survey	H	410 m	MPC · JPL
583798	2016 PK_{40}	—	October 19, 2011	Catalina	CSS	H	620 m	MPC · JPL
583799	2016 PP_{40}	—	December 20, 2007	Mount Lemmon	Mount Lemmon Survey	·	2.0 km	MPC · JPL
583800	2016 PO_{42}	—	February 28, 2009	Kitt Peak	Spacewatch	·	2.7 km	MPC · JPL

== 583801–583900 ==
back to top

Designation			Discovery			Properties		Ref
Permanent	Provisional	Named after	Date	Site	Discoverer(s)	Category	Diam.	Ref
583801	2016 PR_{42}	—	August 7, 2016	Haleakala	Pan-STARRS 1	·	1.6 km	MPC · JPL
583802	2016 PC_{43}	—	May 11, 2015	Haleakala	Pan-STARRS 1	URS	3.1 km	MPC · JPL
583803	2016 PP_{45}	—	November 23, 2012	Kitt Peak	Spacewatch	·	1.4 km	MPC · JPL
583804	2016 PW_{48}	—	March 2, 2009	Mount Lemmon	Mount Lemmon Survey	EOS	1.5 km	MPC · JPL
583805	2016 PK_{52}	—	November 12, 2012	Haleakala	Pan-STARRS 1	·	1.9 km	MPC · JPL
583806	2016 PM_{53}	—	January 30, 2008	Mount Lemmon	Mount Lemmon Survey	·	2.3 km	MPC · JPL
583807	2016 PO_{53}	—	January 18, 2008	Mount Lemmon	Mount Lemmon Survey	EOS	1.6 km	MPC · JPL
583808	2016 PM_{55}	—	January 17, 2008	Mount Lemmon	Mount Lemmon Survey	·	2.4 km	MPC · JPL
583809	2016 PO_{55}	—	September 21, 2011	Haleakala	Pan-STARRS 1	EOS	1.7 km	MPC · JPL
583810	2016 PG_{56}	—	August 7, 2016	Haleakala	Pan-STARRS 1	·	2.4 km	MPC · JPL
583811	2016 PT_{56}	—	August 7, 2016	Haleakala	Pan-STARRS 1	·	2.6 km	MPC · JPL
583812	2016 PY_{56}	—	August 7, 2016	Haleakala	Pan-STARRS 1	·	2.4 km	MPC · JPL
583813	2016 PB_{57}	—	September 26, 2000	Apache Point	SDSS Collaboration	·	1.6 km	MPC · JPL
583814	2016 PD_{57}	—	April 25, 2015	Haleakala	Pan-STARRS 1	EOS	1.6 km	MPC · JPL
583815	2016 PP_{58}	—	May 26, 2015	Haleakala	Pan-STARRS 1	·	1.7 km	MPC · JPL
583816	2016 PB_{60}	—	August 2, 2016	Haleakala	Pan-STARRS 1	·	750 m	MPC · JPL
583817	2016 PX_{60}	—	August 7, 2016	Haleakala	Pan-STARRS 1	·	1.3 km	MPC · JPL
583818	2016 PV_{62}	—	March 18, 2015	Haleakala	Pan-STARRS 1	EOS	1.6 km	MPC · JPL
583819	2016 PU_{63}	—	December 9, 2012	Mount Lemmon	Mount Lemmon Survey	·	1.4 km	MPC · JPL
583820	2016 PY_{64}	—	May 19, 2010	Mount Lemmon	Mount Lemmon Survey	NAE	1.9 km	MPC · JPL
583821	2016 PZ_{64}	—	September 15, 2006	Kitt Peak	Spacewatch	·	2.0 km	MPC · JPL
583822	2016 PA_{65}	—	October 26, 2001	Kitt Peak	Spacewatch	·	2.2 km	MPC · JPL
583823	2016 PY_{65}	—	October 28, 2010	Mount Lemmon	Mount Lemmon Survey	·	520 m	MPC · JPL
583824	2016 PL_{68}	—	November 12, 2012	Mount Lemmon	Mount Lemmon Survey	·	2.1 km	MPC · JPL
583825	2016 PN_{68}	—	May 12, 2015	Mount Lemmon	Mount Lemmon Survey	EOS	1.8 km	MPC · JPL
583826	2016 PK_{69}	—	May 11, 2015	Mount Lemmon	Mount Lemmon Survey	·	1.9 km	MPC · JPL
583827	2016 PZ_{72}	—	September 27, 2011	Kitt Peak	Spacewatch	·	2.2 km	MPC · JPL
583828	2016 PT_{74}	—	September 9, 2008	Mount Lemmon	Mount Lemmon Survey	(5)	870 m	MPC · JPL
583829	2016 PJ_{75}	—	February 13, 2008	Kitt Peak	Spacewatch	·	3.7 km	MPC · JPL
583830	2016 PG_{76}	—	August 25, 2005	Campo Imperatore	CINEOS	·	2.5 km	MPC · JPL
583831	2016 PG_{78}	—	July 9, 2016	Haleakala	Pan-STARRS 1	·	3.2 km	MPC · JPL
583832	2016 PB_{80}	—	March 17, 2005	Mount Lemmon	Mount Lemmon Survey	H	420 m	MPC · JPL
583833	2016 PE_{82}	—	May 21, 2015	Haleakala	Pan-STARRS 1	EOS	1.4 km	MPC · JPL
583834	2016 PP_{83}	—	August 2, 2016	Haleakala	Pan-STARRS 1	·	2.5 km	MPC · JPL
583835	2016 PS_{83}	—	September 3, 2007	Catalina	CSS	·	1.5 km	MPC · JPL
583836	2016 PE_{86}	—	September 20, 2011	Kitt Peak	Spacewatch	INA	2.8 km	MPC · JPL
583837	2016 PP_{88}	—	January 4, 2013	Cerro Tololo-DECam	DECam	·	1.6 km	MPC · JPL
583838	2016 PU_{89}	—	March 13, 2004	Palomar	NEAT	·	2.5 km	MPC · JPL
583839	2016 PR_{90}	—	November 16, 2011	Mount Lemmon	Mount Lemmon Survey	THM	1.9 km	MPC · JPL
583840	2016 PX_{91}	—	April 25, 2015	Haleakala	Pan-STARRS 1	·	1.7 km	MPC · JPL
583841	2016 PX_{93}	—	October 8, 2007	Mount Lemmon	Mount Lemmon Survey	KOR	1.1 km	MPC · JPL
583842	2016 PZ_{94}	—	January 10, 2008	Mount Lemmon	Mount Lemmon Survey	·	2.4 km	MPC · JPL
583843	2016 PJ_{98}	—	September 27, 2008	Mount Lemmon	Mount Lemmon Survey	·	660 m	MPC · JPL
583844	2016 PC_{99}	—	August 2, 2016	Haleakala	Pan-STARRS 1	·	2.0 km	MPC · JPL
583845	2016 PJ_{99}	—	August 3, 2016	Haleakala	Pan-STARRS 1	·	3.0 km	MPC · JPL
583846	2016 PA_{100}	—	November 26, 2012	Mount Lemmon	Mount Lemmon Survey	·	1.7 km	MPC · JPL
583847	2016 PQ_{100}	—	March 21, 2015	Haleakala	Pan-STARRS 1	·	1.3 km	MPC · JPL
583848	2016 PV_{100}	—	May 21, 2015	Haleakala	Pan-STARRS 1	EOS	1.5 km	MPC · JPL
583849	2016 PQ_{105}	—	March 31, 2003	Apache Point	SDSS Collaboration	·	3.4 km	MPC · JPL
583850	2016 PW_{105}	—	September 24, 2011	Haleakala	Pan-STARRS 1	·	2.1 km	MPC · JPL
583851	2016 PV_{106}	—	September 4, 2011	Haleakala	Pan-STARRS 1	EMA	2.4 km	MPC · JPL
583852	2016 PY_{106}	—	December 19, 2007	Kitt Peak	Spacewatch	·	1.5 km	MPC · JPL
583853	2016 PO_{107}	—	September 23, 2011	Kitt Peak	Spacewatch	·	2.2 km	MPC · JPL
583854	2016 PR_{108}	—	August 2, 2016	Haleakala	Pan-STARRS 1	EOS	1.4 km	MPC · JPL
583855	2016 PD_{109}	—	December 12, 2012	Mount Lemmon	Mount Lemmon Survey	·	1.3 km	MPC · JPL
583856	2016 PH_{109}	—	April 5, 2011	Kitt Peak	Spacewatch	·	1.1 km	MPC · JPL
583857	2016 PO_{109}	—	May 10, 2015	Mount Lemmon	Mount Lemmon Survey	·	1.5 km	MPC · JPL
583858	2016 PX_{110}	—	April 20, 2015	Haleakala	Pan-STARRS 1	·	2.0 km	MPC · JPL
583859	2016 PR_{111}	—	August 31, 2005	Palomar	NEAT	·	1.7 km	MPC · JPL
583860	2016 PG_{112}	—	October 21, 2011	Mount Lemmon	Mount Lemmon Survey	·	2.5 km	MPC · JPL
583861	2016 PM_{112}	—	August 2, 2016	Haleakala	Pan-STARRS 1	·	2.2 km	MPC · JPL
583862	2016 PU_{112}	—	August 2, 2016	Haleakala	Pan-STARRS 1	THM	2.1 km	MPC · JPL
583863	2016 PH_{113}	—	October 24, 2011	Haleakala	Pan-STARRS 1	·	2.2 km	MPC · JPL
583864	2016 PS_{113}	—	November 4, 2005	Kitt Peak	Spacewatch	VER	2.4 km	MPC · JPL
583865	2016 PX_{113}	—	August 2, 2016	Haleakala	Pan-STARRS 1	·	1.8 km	MPC · JPL
583866	2016 PC_{114}	—	June 18, 2015	Haleakala	Pan-STARRS 1	·	1.7 km	MPC · JPL
583867	2016 PQ_{116}	—	January 29, 2003	Kitt Peak	Spacewatch	·	1.7 km	MPC · JPL
583868	2016 PV_{117}	—	January 17, 2013	Haleakala	Pan-STARRS 1	EOS	1.7 km	MPC · JPL
583869	2016 PW_{118}	—	August 7, 2016	Haleakala	Pan-STARRS 1	EOS	1.5 km	MPC · JPL
583870	2016 PR_{119}	—	May 26, 2015	Mount Lemmon	Mount Lemmon Survey	EOS	1.5 km	MPC · JPL
583871	2016 PR_{120}	—	March 31, 2011	Mount Lemmon	Mount Lemmon Survey	ADE	1.4 km	MPC · JPL
583872	2016 PA_{121}	—	August 27, 2006	Kitt Peak	Spacewatch	·	1.9 km	MPC · JPL
583873	2016 PG_{122}	—	November 24, 2011	Mount Lemmon	Mount Lemmon Survey	·	1.9 km	MPC · JPL
583874	2016 PM_{122}	—	April 22, 2009	Mount Lemmon	Mount Lemmon Survey	·	1.9 km	MPC · JPL
583875	2016 PT_{122}	—	November 19, 2006	Kitt Peak	Spacewatch	·	1.8 km	MPC · JPL
583876	2016 PO_{123}	—	October 26, 2011	Haleakala	Pan-STARRS 1	·	2.1 km	MPC · JPL
583877	2016 PR_{123}	—	August 10, 2016	Haleakala	Pan-STARRS 1	·	2.3 km	MPC · JPL
583878	2016 PB_{124}	—	September 21, 2011	Mount Lemmon	Mount Lemmon Survey	·	1.8 km	MPC · JPL
583879	2016 PK_{125}	—	October 13, 2002	Palomar	NEAT	BRA	1.7 km	MPC · JPL
583880	2016 PR_{125}	—	August 28, 2005	Kitt Peak	Spacewatch	·	2.2 km	MPC · JPL
583881	2016 PB_{126}	—	August 14, 2016	Haleakala	Pan-STARRS 1	·	1.5 km	MPC · JPL
583882	2016 PY_{126}	—	February 12, 2013	ESA OGS	ESA OGS	·	2.9 km	MPC · JPL
583883	2016 PL_{127}	—	February 28, 2014	Haleakala	Pan-STARRS 1	·	2.5 km	MPC · JPL
583884	2016 PN_{127}	—	March 8, 2003	Kitt Peak	Spacewatch	·	3.7 km	MPC · JPL
583885	2016 PQ_{127}	—	August 26, 2005	Palomar	NEAT	EOS	1.8 km	MPC · JPL
583886	2016 PY_{127}	—	September 29, 2005	Mount Lemmon	Mount Lemmon Survey	·	2.4 km	MPC · JPL
583887	2016 PQ_{128}	—	August 1, 2016	Haleakala	Pan-STARRS 1	EOS	1.6 km	MPC · JPL
583888	2016 PG_{129}	—	August 1, 2016	Haleakala	Pan-STARRS 1	·	2.3 km	MPC · JPL
583889	2016 PN_{129}	—	August 2, 2016	Haleakala	Pan-STARRS 1	·	2.1 km	MPC · JPL
583890	2016 PX_{135}	—	May 25, 2006	Mauna Kea	P. A. Wiegert	·	1.4 km	MPC · JPL
583891	2016 PM_{146}	—	August 9, 2016	Haleakala	Pan-STARRS 1	·	2.0 km	MPC · JPL
583892	2016 PK_{151}	—	August 8, 2016	Haleakala	Pan-STARRS 1	EOS	1.3 km	MPC · JPL
583893	2016 PS_{151}	—	August 7, 2016	Haleakala	Pan-STARRS 1	·	1.7 km	MPC · JPL
583894	2016 PS_{152}	—	August 2, 2016	Haleakala	Pan-STARRS 1	TIR	2.8 km	MPC · JPL
583895	2016 PV_{152}	—	August 2, 2016	Haleakala	Pan-STARRS 1	EOS	1.6 km	MPC · JPL
583896	2016 PW_{152}	—	August 13, 2016	Haleakala	Pan-STARRS 1	EOS	1.5 km	MPC · JPL
583897	2016 PY_{154}	—	August 10, 2016	Haleakala	Pan-STARRS 1	·	2.2 km	MPC · JPL
583898	2016 PC_{156}	—	January 17, 2007	Catalina	CSS	·	3.4 km	MPC · JPL
583899	2016 PT_{156}	—	August 11, 2016	Haleakala	Pan-STARRS 1	·	2.7 km	MPC · JPL
583900	2016 PR_{157}	—	August 7, 2016	Haleakala	Pan-STARRS 1	·	2.2 km	MPC · JPL

== 583901–584000 ==
back to top

Designation			Discovery			Properties		Ref
Permanent	Provisional	Named after	Date	Site	Discoverer(s)	Category	Diam.	Ref
583901	2016 PR_{158}	—	August 1, 2016	Haleakala	Pan-STARRS 1	·	2.6 km	MPC · JPL
583902	2016 PD_{159}	—	July 7, 2016	Mount Lemmon	Mount Lemmon Survey	·	1.9 km	MPC · JPL
583903	2016 PC_{161}	—	August 1, 2016	Haleakala	Pan-STARRS 1	·	2.7 km	MPC · JPL
583904	2016 PQ_{174}	—	August 9, 2016	Haleakala	Pan-STARRS 1	EOS	1.7 km	MPC · JPL
583905	2016 PB_{190}	—	August 3, 2016	Haleakala	Pan-STARRS 1	·	820 m	MPC · JPL
583906	2016 QY_{2}	—	March 9, 2003	Palomar	NEAT	·	3.2 km	MPC · JPL
583907	2016 QD_{3}	—	September 15, 2012	Nogales	M. Schwartz, P. R. Holvorcem	·	1.8 km	MPC · JPL
583908	2016 QM_{3}	—	October 18, 2011	Siding Spring	SSS	·	2.5 km	MPC · JPL
583909	2016 QL_{5}	—	August 20, 2011	Haleakala	Pan-STARRS 1	·	1.9 km	MPC · JPL
583910	2016 QP_{5}	—	July 7, 2016	Haleakala	Pan-STARRS 1	EOS	1.2 km	MPC · JPL
583911	2016 QQ_{6}	—	July 5, 2005	Kitt Peak	Spacewatch	EOS	2.1 km	MPC · JPL
583912	2016 QD_{8}	—	November 25, 2013	Haleakala	Pan-STARRS 1	·	1.2 km	MPC · JPL
583913	2016 QC_{13}	—	August 26, 2016	Mount Lemmon	Mount Lemmon Survey	·	2.1 km	MPC · JPL
583914	2016 QK_{13}	—	March 5, 2014	Haleakala	Pan-STARRS 1	·	1.8 km	MPC · JPL
583915	2016 QT_{13}	—	April 28, 2012	Mount Lemmon	Mount Lemmon Survey	·	610 m	MPC · JPL
583916	2016 QO_{14}	—	July 30, 2000	Cerro Tololo	Deep Ecliptic Survey	·	2.0 km	MPC · JPL
583917	2016 QG_{17}	—	December 5, 2012	Mount Lemmon	Mount Lemmon Survey	EOS	1.7 km	MPC · JPL
583918	2016 QD_{18}	—	September 19, 2011	Haleakala	Pan-STARRS 1	EOS	1.4 km	MPC · JPL
583919	2016 QK_{18}	—	August 26, 2016	Haleakala	Pan-STARRS 1	·	2.2 km	MPC · JPL
583920	2016 QT_{18}	—	August 14, 2016	Haleakala	Pan-STARRS 1	·	1.5 km	MPC · JPL
583921	2016 QY_{18}	—	December 30, 2007	Kitt Peak	Spacewatch	·	2.7 km	MPC · JPL
583922	2016 QE_{19}	—	September 3, 2005	Mauna Kea	P. A. Wiegert	EOS	1.9 km	MPC · JPL
583923	2016 QO_{19}	—	December 18, 2001	Socorro	LINEAR	·	3.0 km	MPC · JPL
583924	2016 QW_{20}	—	September 20, 2011	Mount Lemmon	Mount Lemmon Survey	EOS	1.4 km	MPC · JPL
583925	2016 QA_{21}	—	October 21, 2011	Mount Lemmon	Mount Lemmon Survey	EOS	1.5 km	MPC · JPL
583926	2016 QF_{21}	—	December 21, 2012	Mount Lemmon	Mount Lemmon Survey	·	2.0 km	MPC · JPL
583927	2016 QW_{23}	—	September 17, 2006	Kitt Peak	Spacewatch	·	2.5 km	MPC · JPL
583928	2016 QJ_{25}	—	April 18, 2010	Cerro Burek	Burek, Cerro	·	2.1 km	MPC · JPL
583929	2016 QT_{26}	—	October 16, 2007	Mount Lemmon	Mount Lemmon Survey	·	1.7 km	MPC · JPL
583930	2016 QD_{28}	—	August 27, 2006	Anderson Mesa	LONEOS	·	1.8 km	MPC · JPL
583931	2016 QE_{28}	—	September 27, 2011	Mount Lemmon	Mount Lemmon Survey	·	3.3 km	MPC · JPL
583932	2016 QX_{28}	—	July 1, 2011	Mount Lemmon	Mount Lemmon Survey	·	1.9 km	MPC · JPL
583933	2016 QA_{29}	—	September 23, 2011	Haleakala	Pan-STARRS 1	THM	2.1 km	MPC · JPL
583934	2016 QJ_{29}	—	May 18, 2015	Haleakala	Pan-STARRS 2	·	1.7 km	MPC · JPL
583935	2016 QV_{33}	—	August 25, 2001	Kitt Peak	Spacewatch	·	930 m	MPC · JPL
583936	2016 QS_{34}	—	September 11, 2002	Palomar	NEAT	·	600 m	MPC · JPL
583937	2016 QV_{36}	—	September 4, 2011	Kitt Peak	Spacewatch	·	1.8 km	MPC · JPL
583938	2016 QL_{39}	—	November 5, 2007	Kitt Peak	Spacewatch	·	2.0 km	MPC · JPL
583939	2016 QA_{40}	—	September 18, 2011	Mount Lemmon	Mount Lemmon Survey	·	1.7 km	MPC · JPL
583940	2016 QN_{40}	—	April 2, 2015	Haleakala	Pan-STARRS 1	·	1.8 km	MPC · JPL
583941	2016 QE_{41}	—	April 1, 2008	Kitt Peak	Spacewatch	·	920 m	MPC · JPL
583942	2016 QN_{41}	—	November 2, 2011	Mount Lemmon	Mount Lemmon Survey	·	2.2 km	MPC · JPL
583943	2016 QM_{43}	—	July 14, 2016	Haleakala	Pan-STARRS 1	MAS	680 m	MPC · JPL
583944	2016 QZ_{46}	—	September 8, 2000	Kitt Peak	Spacewatch	EOS	1.7 km	MPC · JPL
583945	2016 QV_{49}	—	July 11, 2016	Haleakala	Pan-STARRS 1	·	2.0 km	MPC · JPL
583946	2016 QE_{54}	—	August 28, 2016	Mount Lemmon	Mount Lemmon Survey	EOS	1.8 km	MPC · JPL
583947	2016 QG_{54}	—	September 26, 2011	Kitt Peak	Spacewatch	·	2.5 km	MPC · JPL
583948	2016 QC_{55}	—	February 17, 2007	Palomar	NEAT	·	2.7 km	MPC · JPL
583949	2016 QO_{56}	—	January 12, 2002	Palomar	NEAT	·	4.0 km	MPC · JPL
583950	2016 QW_{56}	—	November 12, 2001	Apache Point	SDSS	·	2.1 km	MPC · JPL
583951	2016 QH_{57}	—	May 15, 2015	Haleakala	Pan-STARRS 1	EOS	1.5 km	MPC · JPL
583952	2016 QY_{57}	—	December 11, 2012	Mount Lemmon	Mount Lemmon Survey	·	2.7 km	MPC · JPL
583953	2016 QB_{58}	—	September 19, 2011	Haleakala	Pan-STARRS 1	·	1.8 km	MPC · JPL
583954	2016 QY_{61}	—	September 20, 2011	Haleakala	Pan-STARRS 1	·	1.4 km	MPC · JPL
583955	2016 QQ_{62}	—	February 8, 2008	Mount Lemmon	Mount Lemmon Survey	·	2.4 km	MPC · JPL
583956	2016 QS_{63}	—	May 21, 2015	Haleakala	Pan-STARRS 1	·	1.8 km	MPC · JPL
583957	2016 QT_{63}	—	February 28, 2014	Haleakala	Pan-STARRS 1	·	2.6 km	MPC · JPL
583958	2016 QE_{64}	—	August 3, 2016	Haleakala	Pan-STARRS 1	·	1.6 km	MPC · JPL
583959	2016 QW_{64}	—	September 18, 2006	Kitt Peak	Spacewatch	·	1.8 km	MPC · JPL
583960	2016 QA_{65}	—	September 16, 2003	Kitt Peak	Spacewatch	·	430 m	MPC · JPL
583961	2016 QA_{66}	—	September 19, 2011	Haleakala	Pan-STARRS 1	·	2.2 km	MPC · JPL
583962	2016 QB_{67}	—	January 26, 2014	Calar Alto-CASADO	Mottola, S., Hellmich, S.	·	1.4 km	MPC · JPL
583963	2016 QH_{67}	—	November 12, 2007	Mount Lemmon	Mount Lemmon Survey	·	2.3 km	MPC · JPL
583964	2016 QF_{69}	—	December 31, 2007	Kitt Peak	Spacewatch	EOS	1.9 km	MPC · JPL
583965	2016 QM_{69}	—	July 30, 2005	Palomar	NEAT	·	3.5 km	MPC · JPL
583966	2016 QR_{69}	—	January 4, 2013	Cerro Tololo-DECam	DECam	·	1.9 km	MPC · JPL
583967	2016 QX_{70}	—	July 29, 2005	Palomar	NEAT	·	2.2 km	MPC · JPL
583968	2016 QO_{72}	—	March 8, 2008	Mount Lemmon	Mount Lemmon Survey	·	2.6 km	MPC · JPL
583969	2016 QU_{72}	—	October 11, 1999	Kitt Peak	Spacewatch	·	2.4 km	MPC · JPL
583970	2016 QB_{75}	—	August 29, 2005	Kitt Peak	Spacewatch	V	550 m	MPC · JPL
583971	2016 QD_{76}	—	November 1, 2011	Catalina	CSS	·	2.9 km	MPC · JPL
583972 Rybnikov	2016 QA_{77}	Rybnikov	October 22, 2011	Zelenchukskaya Stn	T. V. Krjačko, Satovski, B.	·	3.1 km	MPC · JPL
583973	2016 QP_{79}	—	August 6, 2005	Palomar	NEAT	ERI	1.4 km	MPC · JPL
583974	2016 QC_{80}	—	June 10, 2012	Mount Lemmon	Mount Lemmon Survey	NYS	700 m	MPC · JPL
583975	2016 QH_{80}	—	December 2, 2000	Haleakala	NEAT	·	3.5 km	MPC · JPL
583976	2016 QC_{81}	—	September 27, 2011	Bergisch Gladbach	W. Bickel	·	2.1 km	MPC · JPL
583977	2016 QE_{81}	—	August 6, 2005	Palomar	NEAT	·	2.6 km	MPC · JPL
583978	2016 QU_{82}	—	April 21, 2010	WISE	WISE	·	2.3 km	MPC · JPL
583979	2016 QH_{83}	—	September 28, 2006	Catalina	CSS	EOS	2.1 km	MPC · JPL
583980	2016 QJ_{85}	—	April 13, 2004	Kitt Peak	Spacewatch	KOR	1.6 km	MPC · JPL
583981	2016 QR_{85}	—	December 29, 2014	Haleakala	Pan-STARRS 1	H	410 m	MPC · JPL
583982	2016 QS_{85}	—	January 18, 2015	Haleakala	Pan-STARRS 1	H	430 m	MPC · JPL
583983	2016 QT_{85}	—	November 27, 2014	Haleakala	Pan-STARRS 1	H	480 m	MPC · JPL
583984	2016 QE_{86}	—	April 17, 2015	Mount Lemmon	Mount Lemmon Survey	H	420 m	MPC · JPL
583985	2016 QP_{87}	—	August 30, 2016	Haleakala	Pan-STARRS 1	·	980 m	MPC · JPL
583986	2016 QO_{88}	—	November 24, 2006	Mount Lemmon	Mount Lemmon Survey	·	2.1 km	MPC · JPL
583987	2016 QQ_{88}	—	December 23, 2012	Haleakala	Pan-STARRS 1	·	2.5 km	MPC · JPL
583988	2016 QG_{89}	—	September 25, 2011	Haleakala	Pan-STARRS 1	EOS	1.6 km	MPC · JPL
583989	2016 QH_{90}	—	April 24, 2014	Mount Lemmon	Mount Lemmon Survey	·	2.9 km	MPC · JPL
583990	2016 QZ_{90}	—	November 25, 2011	Haleakala	Pan-STARRS 1	·	2.4 km	MPC · JPL
583991	2016 QR_{91}	—	September 19, 2011	Haleakala	Pan-STARRS 1	·	1.9 km	MPC · JPL
583992	2016 QD_{92}	—	September 1, 2005	Kitt Peak	Spacewatch	·	1.8 km	MPC · JPL
583993	2016 QO_{92}	—	September 21, 2000	Kitt Peak	Deep Ecliptic Survey	EOS	1.6 km	MPC · JPL
583994	2016 QJ_{93}	—	February 3, 2013	Haleakala	Pan-STARRS 1	·	2.6 km	MPC · JPL
583995	2016 QO_{93}	—	May 11, 2015	Mount Lemmon	Mount Lemmon Survey	·	2.1 km	MPC · JPL
583996	2016 QY_{93}	—	April 1, 2003	Apache Point	SDSS Collaboration	·	2.5 km	MPC · JPL
583997	2016 QA_{95}	—	August 29, 2016	Piszkéstető	K. Sárneczky, Szekely, P.	·	3.1 km	MPC · JPL
583998	2016 QZ_{103}	—	August 30, 2016	Mount Lemmon	Mount Lemmon Survey	EOS	1.9 km	MPC · JPL
583999	2016 QC_{104}	—	August 28, 2016	Mount Lemmon	Mount Lemmon Survey	·	2.5 km	MPC · JPL
584000	2016 QH_{104}	—	August 28, 2016	Mount Lemmon	Mount Lemmon Survey	·	2.4 km	MPC · JPL

back to top

== Meaning of names ==
As minor planet discoveries are confirmed, they are given a permanent number by the IAU's Minor Planet Center (MPC), and the discoverers can then submit names for them, following the IAU's naming conventions. The list below concerns those minor planets in the specified number-range that have received names, and explains the meanings of those names.

Official naming citations of newly named small Solar System bodies are approved and published in a bulletin by IAU's Working Group for Small Bodies Nomenclature (WGSBN). Before May 2021, citations were published in MPC's Minor Planet Circulars for many decades. Recent citations can also be found on the JPL Small-Body Database (SBDB). Until his death in 2016, German astronomer Lutz D. Schmadel compiled these citations into the Dictionary of Minor Planet Names (DMP) and regularly updated the collection.

Based on Paul Herget's The Names of the Minor Planets, Schmadel also researched the unclear origin of numerous asteroids, most of which had been named prior to World War II. This article incorporates text from this source, which is in the public domain: SBDB New namings may only be added to this list below after official publication as the preannouncement of names is condemned. The WGSBN publishes a comprehensive guideline for the naming rules of non-cometary small Solar System bodies.

Named minor planet	Provisional	This minor planet was named for...	Ref · Catalog
583418 Herbertgush	2016 GW_{202}	Herbert Gush, Canadian astrophysicist at the University of British Columbia.	IAU · 583418
583729 Tejfel	2016 NR_{70}	Viktor Tejfel, Kazakhstan astronomer.	IAU · 583729
583972 Rybnikov	2016 QA_{77}	Alexey Lvovich Rybnikov (born 1945), Russian composer who has written music for many films.	IAU · 583972
