= List of minor planets: 731001–732000 =

The following is a partial list of minor planets, running from minor-planet number 731001 through 732000, inclusive. The primary data for this and other partial lists is based on JPL's "Small-Body Orbital Elements" and data available from the Minor Planet Center. Critical list information is also provided by the MPC, unless otherwise specified from Lowell Observatory. A detailed description of the table's columns and additional sources are given on the main page including a complete list of every page in this series, and a statistical break-up on the dynamical classification of minor planets.

Also see the summary list of all named bodies in numerical and alphabetical order, and the corresponding naming citations for the number range of this particular list. New namings may only be added to this list after official publication, as the preannouncement of names is condemned by the Working Group for Small Bodies Nomenclature of the International Astronomical Union.

Near-Earth obj.	MBA (inner)	MBA (outer)	Centaur
Mars-crosser	MBA (middle)	Jupiter trojan	Trans-Neptunian obj.
Unclassified

== 731001–731100 ==
Designation			Discovery			Properties		Ref
Permanent	Provisional	Named after	Date	Site	Discoverer(s)	Category	Diam.	Ref
731001	2012 XD_{49}	—	July 9, 2003	Kitt Peak	Spacewatch	·	2.7 km	MPC · JPL
731002	2012 XR_{58}	—	November 14, 2012	Kitt Peak	Spacewatch	·	1.3 km	MPC · JPL
731003	2012 XR_{63}	—	March 24, 2001	Kitt Peak	Spacewatch	·	1.3 km	MPC · JPL
731004	2012 XM_{64}	—	December 4, 2012	Mount Lemmon	Mount Lemmon Survey	·	1.1 km	MPC · JPL
731005	2012 XC_{65}	—	December 4, 2012	Mount Lemmon	Mount Lemmon Survey	ADE	1.6 km	MPC · JPL
731006	2012 XL_{65}	—	July 26, 2010	WISE	WISE	·	2.1 km	MPC · JPL
731007	2012 XN_{65}	—	September 27, 2003	Apache Point	SDSS Collaboration	EUN	1.4 km	MPC · JPL
731008	2012 XT_{69}	—	October 23, 2003	Apache Point	SDSS Collaboration	·	1.3 km	MPC · JPL
731009	2012 XD_{70}	—	April 2, 2006	Kitt Peak	Spacewatch	·	1.2 km	MPC · JPL
731010	2012 XS_{70}	—	May 11, 2010	Mount Lemmon	Mount Lemmon Survey	·	2.1 km	MPC · JPL
731011	2012 XC_{71}	—	December 6, 2012	Mount Lemmon	Mount Lemmon Survey	·	1.3 km	MPC · JPL
731012	2012 XF_{75}	—	February 3, 2009	Kitt Peak	Spacewatch	·	1.9 km	MPC · JPL
731013	2012 XJ_{77}	—	November 30, 2008	Mount Lemmon	Mount Lemmon Survey	·	890 m	MPC · JPL
731014	2012 XK_{77}	—	November 19, 2012	Kitt Peak	Spacewatch	·	780 m	MPC · JPL
731015	2012 XM_{77}	—	May 5, 2002	Palomar	NEAT	·	3.3 km	MPC · JPL
731016	2012 XR_{79}	—	January 8, 2010	WISE	WISE	·	1.2 km	MPC · JPL
731017	2012 XC_{81}	—	September 14, 2007	Mount Lemmon	Mount Lemmon Survey	·	1.2 km	MPC · JPL
731018	2012 XC_{84}	—	September 26, 2000	Apache Point	SDSS Collaboration	·	3.4 km	MPC · JPL
731019	2012 XN_{85}	—	December 7, 2012	Haleakala	Pan-STARRS 1	·	1.3 km	MPC · JPL
731020	2012 XU_{85}	—	March 14, 2004	Palomar	NEAT	·	4.5 km	MPC · JPL
731021	2012 XH_{90}	—	April 25, 2000	Kitt Peak	Spacewatch	KOR	1.3 km	MPC · JPL
731022	2012 XX_{90}	—	November 6, 2012	Kitt Peak	Spacewatch	·	1.0 km	MPC · JPL
731023	2012 XB_{92}	—	December 8, 2012	Mount Lemmon	Mount Lemmon Survey	·	1.5 km	MPC · JPL
731024	2012 XM_{102}	—	July 31, 2010	WISE	WISE	·	2.0 km	MPC · JPL
731025	2012 XT_{112}	—	December 5, 2012	Mount Lemmon	Mount Lemmon Survey	·	2.6 km	MPC · JPL
731026	2012 XV_{119}	—	December 31, 2008	Kitt Peak	Spacewatch	·	980 m	MPC · JPL
731027	2012 XB_{120}	—	January 14, 2002	Palomar	NEAT	·	3.3 km	MPC · JPL
731028	2012 XP_{120}	—	November 10, 2006	Lulin	LUSS	·	3.4 km	MPC · JPL
731029	2012 XR_{121}	—	September 28, 2003	Kitt Peak	Spacewatch	·	1 km	MPC · JPL
731030	2012 XR_{124}	—	December 9, 2012	Haleakala	Pan-STARRS 1	VER	2.0 km	MPC · JPL
731031	2012 XU_{126}	—	November 2, 2006	Kitt Peak	Spacewatch	·	3.7 km	MPC · JPL
731032	2012 XE_{131}	—	December 11, 2012	Mount Lemmon	Mount Lemmon Survey	·	1.3 km	MPC · JPL
731033	2012 XB_{132}	—	June 16, 2010	Mount Lemmon	Mount Lemmon Survey	·	1.4 km	MPC · JPL
731034	2012 XT_{133}	—	September 19, 1995	La Silla	C.-I. Lagerkvist	·	1.6 km	MPC · JPL
731035	2012 XZ_{136}	—	June 10, 2010	WISE	WISE	·	2.7 km	MPC · JPL
731036	2012 XA_{137}	—	October 15, 2001	Palomar	NEAT	·	4.9 km	MPC · JPL
731037	2012 XP_{138}	—	October 2, 2006	Mount Lemmon	Mount Lemmon Survey	·	4.1 km	MPC · JPL
731038	2012 XU_{139}	—	March 31, 2009	Mount Lemmon	Mount Lemmon Survey	·	4.8 km	MPC · JPL
731039	2012 XT_{144}	—	May 23, 2001	Cerro Tololo	Deep Ecliptic Survey	KOR	1.4 km	MPC · JPL
731040	2012 XR_{145}	—	November 7, 2008	Mount Lemmon	Mount Lemmon Survey	·	1.1 km	MPC · JPL
731041	2012 XT_{146}	—	December 11, 2004	Kitt Peak	Spacewatch	(5)	1.1 km	MPC · JPL
731042	2012 XO_{151}	—	April 1, 2003	Apache Point	SDSS Collaboration	·	3.1 km	MPC · JPL
731043	2012 XZ_{151}	—	September 21, 2003	Kitt Peak	Spacewatch	·	1.2 km	MPC · JPL
731044	2012 XJ_{153}	—	October 23, 2001	Desert Eagle	W. K. Y. Yeung	EUP	5.2 km	MPC · JPL
731045	2012 XB_{155}	—	July 7, 2011	Siding Spring	SSS	·	3.1 km	MPC · JPL
731046	2012 XD_{156}	—	May 29, 2002	Palomar	NEAT	·	3.9 km	MPC · JPL
731047	2012 XF_{157}	—	December 10, 2012	Kitt Peak	Spacewatch	·	1.1 km	MPC · JPL
731048	2012 XA_{163}	—	May 9, 2010	WISE	WISE	·	590 m	MPC · JPL
731049	2012 XJ_{163}	—	March 15, 2010	WISE	WISE	·	3.1 km	MPC · JPL
731050	2012 XL_{165}	—	April 14, 2010	WISE	WISE	·	2.4 km	MPC · JPL
731051	2012 XW_{168}	—	December 12, 2012	Mount Lemmon	Mount Lemmon Survey	·	1.2 km	MPC · JPL
731052	2012 XK_{169}	—	December 9, 2012	Piszkéstető	K. Sárneczky	·	1.5 km	MPC · JPL
731053	2012 XW_{170}	—	December 9, 2012	Haleakala	Pan-STARRS 1	·	1.6 km	MPC · JPL
731054	2012 XZ_{170}	—	December 6, 2012	Mount Lemmon	Mount Lemmon Survey	·	1.4 km	MPC · JPL
731055	2012 XB_{171}	—	December 12, 2012	Mount Lemmon	Mount Lemmon Survey	·	1.1 km	MPC · JPL
731056	2012 XR_{171}	—	December 4, 2012	Mount Lemmon	Mount Lemmon Survey	MAR	900 m	MPC · JPL
731057	2012 XD_{172}	—	December 2, 2012	Mount Lemmon	Mount Lemmon Survey	EUN	960 m	MPC · JPL
731058	2012 XM_{172}	—	December 13, 2012	Mount Lemmon	Mount Lemmon Survey	·	1.2 km	MPC · JPL
731059	2012 XR_{172}	—	December 15, 2012	ESA OGS	ESA OGS	(5)	1.1 km	MPC · JPL
731060	2012 XG_{173}	—	December 11, 2012	Mount Lemmon	Mount Lemmon Survey	·	1.1 km	MPC · JPL
731061	2012 XS_{174}	—	December 28, 2003	Kitt Peak	Spacewatch	DOR	1.9 km	MPC · JPL
731062	2012 XU_{174}	—	December 7, 2012	Mount Lemmon	Mount Lemmon Survey	L4	5.9 km	MPC · JPL
731063	2012 XK_{178}	—	December 9, 2012	Mount Lemmon	Mount Lemmon Survey	·	1.0 km	MPC · JPL
731064	2012 YM	—	November 1, 2005	Anderson Mesa	LONEOS	·	4.5 km	MPC · JPL
731065	2012 YT_{2}	—	December 23, 2001	Kitt Peak	Spacewatch	·	2.7 km	MPC · JPL
731066	2012 YJ_{5}	—	March 18, 2010	WISE	WISE	·	1.6 km	MPC · JPL
731067	2012 YD_{6}	—	December 19, 2012	Calar Alto-CASADO	Mottola, S.	HNS	1.2 km	MPC · JPL
731068	2012 YE_{6}	—	November 4, 2007	Kitt Peak	Spacewatch	·	1.3 km	MPC · JPL
731069	2012 YY_{9}	—	April 4, 2005	Mount Lemmon	Mount Lemmon Survey	·	1.3 km	MPC · JPL
731070	2012 YP_{10}	—	January 19, 2009	Mount Lemmon	Mount Lemmon Survey	·	1.0 km	MPC · JPL
731071	2012 YU_{17}	—	December 23, 2012	Haleakala	Pan-STARRS 1	·	2.7 km	MPC · JPL
731072	2012 YZ_{20}	—	December 23, 2012	Haleakala	Pan-STARRS 1	PAD	1.3 km	MPC · JPL
731073	2012 YH_{21}	—	December 23, 2012	Haleakala	Pan-STARRS 1	(2076)	730 m	MPC · JPL
731074	2013 AG_{1}	—	December 22, 2012	Haleakala	Pan-STARRS 1	L4	8.5 km	MPC · JPL
731075	2013 AL_{2}	—	June 23, 2011	Zelenchukskaya	T. V. Krjačko	H	560 m	MPC · JPL
731076	2013 AB_{5}	—	December 2, 2008	Mount Lemmon	Mount Lemmon Survey	·	1.3 km	MPC · JPL
731077	2013 AO_{10}	—	January 20, 2009	Kitt Peak	Spacewatch	·	1.0 km	MPC · JPL
731078	2013 AA_{11}	—	April 29, 2006	Siding Spring	SSS	·	1.8 km	MPC · JPL
731079	2013 AC_{13}	—	August 26, 2003	Cerro Tololo	Deep Ecliptic Survey	·	920 m	MPC · JPL
731080	2013 AG_{13}	—	January 3, 2013	Mount Lemmon	Mount Lemmon Survey	·	1.2 km	MPC · JPL
731081	2013 AU_{15}	—	January 8, 1999	Kitt Peak	Spacewatch	·	3.3 km	MPC · JPL
731082	2013 AM_{19}	—	June 27, 2010	WISE	WISE	·	630 m	MPC · JPL
731083	2013 AC_{20}	—	May 7, 2002	Mount Hopkins	T. B. Spahr, M. Calkins	T_{j} (2.72)	4.7 km	MPC · JPL
731084	2013 AT_{21}	—	November 9, 2007	Mount Lemmon	Mount Lemmon Survey	VER	4.5 km	MPC · JPL
731085	2013 AZ_{24}	—	January 5, 2013	Kitt Peak	Spacewatch	·	1.2 km	MPC · JPL
731086	2013 AR_{25}	—	April 9, 2010	WISE	WISE	·	3.6 km	MPC · JPL
731087	2013 AQ_{29}	—	January 26, 2001	Kitt Peak	Spacewatch	L4	8.6 km	MPC · JPL
731088	2013 AZ_{31}	—	November 19, 2003	Kitt Peak	Spacewatch	L5	10 km	MPC · JPL
731089	2013 AY_{34}	—	February 17, 2010	Mount Lemmon	Mount Lemmon Survey	·	500 m	MPC · JPL
731090	2013 AA_{44}	—	January 31, 2009	Mount Lemmon	Mount Lemmon Survey	·	1.0 km	MPC · JPL
731091	2013 AA_{56}	—	January 30, 2008	Mount Lemmon	Mount Lemmon Survey	·	2.8 km	MPC · JPL
731092	2013 AF_{56}	—	March 4, 2006	Catalina	CSS	·	1.3 km	MPC · JPL
731093	2013 AJ_{57}	—	October 22, 2003	Kitt Peak	Spacewatch	·	1.4 km	MPC · JPL
731094	2013 AS_{59}	—	March 12, 2007	Catalina	CSS	·	930 m	MPC · JPL
731095	2013 AW_{62}	—	December 1, 2008	Mount Lemmon	Mount Lemmon Survey	EUN	1.2 km	MPC · JPL
731096	2013 AL_{66}	—	December 8, 2012	Nogales	M. Schwartz, P. R. Holvorcem	·	1.4 km	MPC · JPL
731097	2013 AQ_{66}	—	December 9, 2004	Kitt Peak	Spacewatch	·	890 m	MPC · JPL
731098	2013 AC_{72}	—	January 10, 2013	Mount Lemmon	Mount Lemmon Survey	·	1.3 km	MPC · JPL
731099	2013 AD_{73}	—	December 15, 1999	Kitt Peak	Spacewatch	·	1.2 km	MPC · JPL
731100	2013 AE_{75}	—	January 31, 2009	Kitt Peak	Spacewatch	EUN	1.0 km	MPC · JPL

== 731101–731200 ==
back to top

Designation			Discovery			Properties		Ref
Permanent	Provisional	Named after	Date	Site	Discoverer(s)	Category	Diam.	Ref
731101	2013 AJ_{80}	—	January 25, 2003	Apache Point	SDSS Collaboration	KOR	1.3 km	MPC · JPL
731102	2013 AC_{81}	—	May 13, 2005	Kitt Peak	Spacewatch	·	2.3 km	MPC · JPL
731103	2013 AO_{84}	—	September 14, 2007	Mount Lemmon	Mount Lemmon Survey	·	1.1 km	MPC · JPL
731104	2013 AY_{87}	—	June 23, 2010	WISE	WISE	·	2.8 km	MPC · JPL
731105	2013 AJ_{90}	—	January 15, 2013	Catalina	CSS	·	1.7 km	MPC · JPL
731106	2013 AU_{90}	—	December 31, 2003	Kitt Peak	Spacewatch	·	2.0 km	MPC · JPL
731107	2013 AH_{93}	—	October 22, 2003	Apache Point	SDSS Collaboration	ADE	1.8 km	MPC · JPL
731108	2013 AB_{96}	—	January 28, 2000	Kitt Peak	Spacewatch	ADE	1.6 km	MPC · JPL
731109	2013 AP_{97}	—	December 30, 2007	Kitt Peak	Spacewatch	·	2.3 km	MPC · JPL
731110	2013 AB_{98}	—	January 5, 2013	Mount Lemmon	Mount Lemmon Survey	BRG	1.4 km	MPC · JPL
731111	2013 AN_{99}	—	May 1, 2010	WISE	WISE	·	2.5 km	MPC · JPL
731112	2013 AV_{100}	—	November 21, 2001	Apache Point	SDSS Collaboration	EOS	2.6 km	MPC · JPL
731113	2013 AA_{108}	—	December 14, 2006	Palomar	NEAT	·	4.9 km	MPC · JPL
731114	2013 AD_{108}	—	June 21, 2010	WISE	WISE	·	1.9 km	MPC · JPL
731115	2013 AH_{108}	—	December 4, 2007	Mount Lemmon	Mount Lemmon Survey	·	1.5 km	MPC · JPL
731116	2013 AK_{110}	—	January 3, 2013	Mount Lemmon	Mount Lemmon Survey	·	1.1 km	MPC · JPL
731117	2013 AG_{111}	—	May 12, 2004	Palomar	NEAT	·	3.8 km	MPC · JPL
731118	2013 AU_{111}	—	January 10, 2013	Kitt Peak	Spacewatch	MAR	1.1 km	MPC · JPL
731119	2013 AC_{113}	—	October 5, 2002	Apache Point	SDSS Collaboration	·	870 m	MPC · JPL
731120	2013 AK_{114}	—	January 13, 2013	Mount Lemmon	Mount Lemmon Survey	EMA	2.7 km	MPC · JPL
731121	2013 AP_{114}	—	January 13, 2013	Mount Lemmon	Mount Lemmon Survey	·	1.4 km	MPC · JPL
731122	2013 AN_{123}	—	February 11, 2004	Palomar	NEAT	·	2.3 km	MPC · JPL
731123	2013 AD_{124}	—	October 5, 2005	Catalina	CSS	·	3.1 km	MPC · JPL
731124 Rosvick	2013 AS_{124}	Rosvick	August 21, 2003	Mauna Kea	D. D. Balam, K. M. Perrett	·	1.1 km	MPC · JPL
731125	2013 AD_{126}	—	March 13, 2002	Palomar	NEAT	·	5.6 km	MPC · JPL
731126	2013 AT_{128}	—	April 9, 2002	Palomar	NEAT	LUT	5.1 km	MPC · JPL
731127	2013 AF_{129}	—	January 10, 2013	Haleakala	Pan-STARRS 1	ADE	1.8 km	MPC · JPL
731128	2013 AC_{130}	—	December 23, 2012	Haleakala	Pan-STARRS 1	·	1.5 km	MPC · JPL
731129	2013 AM_{131}	—	January 8, 2010	WISE	WISE	L4	10 km	MPC · JPL
731130	2013 AH_{132}	—	December 11, 2004	Kitt Peak	Spacewatch	·	1.1 km	MPC · JPL
731131	2013 AH_{134}	—	May 15, 2010	WISE	WISE	·	2.6 km	MPC · JPL
731132	2013 AC_{136}	—	January 10, 2013	Haleakala	Pan-STARRS 1	L4	7.1 km	MPC · JPL
731133	2013 AJ_{137}	—	April 2, 2009	Kitt Peak	Spacewatch	·	2.9 km	MPC · JPL
731134	2013 AQ_{137}	—	January 20, 2009	Kitt Peak	Spacewatch	·	880 m	MPC · JPL
731135	2013 AD_{141}	—	January 4, 2013	Cerro Tololo-DECam	DECam	·	1.1 km	MPC · JPL
731136	2013 AX_{154}	—	October 7, 2007	Mount Lemmon	Mount Lemmon Survey	·	1.1 km	MPC · JPL
731137	2013 AN_{157}	—	May 14, 2010	WISE	WISE	·	2.3 km	MPC · JPL
731138	2013 AG_{163}	—	January 20, 2013	Mount Lemmon	Mount Lemmon Survey	·	980 m	MPC · JPL
731139	2013 AC_{164}	—	December 6, 2007	Mount Lemmon	Mount Lemmon Survey	·	1.7 km	MPC · JPL
731140	2013 AS_{164}	—	January 4, 2013	Cerro Tololo-DECam	DECam	·	1.4 km	MPC · JPL
731141	2013 AT_{166}	—	January 20, 2013	Mount Lemmon	Mount Lemmon Survey	·	920 m	MPC · JPL
731142	2013 AU_{174}	—	September 1, 2005	Palomar	NEAT	·	3.2 km	MPC · JPL
731143	2013 AU_{182}	—	November 21, 2001	Apache Point	SDSS Collaboration	·	2.1 km	MPC · JPL
731144	2013 AZ_{183}	—	January 10, 2013	Haleakala	Pan-STARRS 1	L4	6.6 km	MPC · JPL
731145	2013 AW_{185}	—	January 6, 2013	Kitt Peak	Spacewatch	·	1.8 km	MPC · JPL
731146	2013 AF_{186}	—	January 5, 2013	Mount Lemmon	Mount Lemmon Survey	·	1.2 km	MPC · JPL
731147	2013 AP_{186}	—	January 7, 2013	Oukaïmeden	M. Ory	EUN	1.0 km	MPC · JPL
731148	2013 AU_{187}	—	January 10, 2013	Haleakala	Pan-STARRS 1	·	1.1 km	MPC · JPL
731149	2013 AY_{187}	—	January 1, 2009	Kitt Peak	Spacewatch	MAR	720 m	MPC · JPL
731150	2013 AB_{190}	—	January 10, 2013	Haleakala	Pan-STARRS 1	·	2.9 km	MPC · JPL
731151	2013 AT_{196}	—	January 5, 2013	Mount Lemmon	Mount Lemmon Survey	·	1.3 km	MPC · JPL
731152	2013 AU_{196}	—	January 15, 2013	Catalina	CSS	·	3.3 km	MPC · JPL
731153	2013 AO_{200}	—	January 10, 2013	Haleakala	Pan-STARRS 1	·	1.5 km	MPC · JPL
731154	2013 AQ_{202}	—	January 6, 2013	Kitt Peak	Spacewatch	·	1.1 km	MPC · JPL
731155	2013 AN_{203}	—	January 8, 2013	Oukaïmeden	M. Ory	AGN	840 m	MPC · JPL
731156	2013 AV_{203}	—	January 12, 2013	Mount Lemmon	Mount Lemmon Survey	ADE	1.4 km	MPC · JPL
731157	2013 AJ_{205}	—	January 10, 2013	Haleakala	Pan-STARRS 1	L4	6.2 km	MPC · JPL
731158	2013 BC_{1}	—	March 31, 2003	Apache Point	SDSS Collaboration	L4	10 km	MPC · JPL
731159	2013 BV_{3}	—	January 16, 2013	Mount Lemmon	Mount Lemmon Survey	·	1.0 km	MPC · JPL
731160	2013 BA_{7}	—	July 5, 2010	WISE	WISE	LIX	3.8 km	MPC · JPL
731161	2013 BS_{10}	—	October 31, 2008	Mount Lemmon	Mount Lemmon Survey	·	530 m	MPC · JPL
731162	2013 BD_{11}	—	May 22, 2010	WISE	WISE	·	1.6 km	MPC · JPL
731163	2013 BK_{11}	—	January 16, 2013	Haleakala	Pan-STARRS 1	·	1.2 km	MPC · JPL
731164	2013 BV_{12}	—	October 19, 2007	Kitt Peak	Spacewatch	·	1.4 km	MPC · JPL
731165	2013 BW_{13}	—	April 2, 2010	WISE	WISE	·	3.5 km	MPC · JPL
731166	2013 BH_{14}	—	May 26, 2010	WISE	WISE	·	1.6 km	MPC · JPL
731167	2013 BS_{14}	—	September 23, 2004	Kitt Peak	Spacewatch	·	900 m	MPC · JPL
731168	2013 BU_{14}	—	February 5, 2009	Kitt Peak	Spacewatch	·	1.2 km	MPC · JPL
731169	2013 BH_{22}	—	December 23, 2012	Haleakala	Pan-STARRS 1	·	1.4 km	MPC · JPL
731170	2013 BV_{22}	—	June 20, 2005	Palomar	NEAT	·	5.8 km	MPC · JPL
731171	2013 BO_{24}	—	September 26, 2003	Apache Point	SDSS Collaboration	(5)	1.0 km	MPC · JPL
731172	2013 BW_{28}	—	August 27, 2005	Anderson Mesa	LONEOS	·	4.4 km	MPC · JPL
731173	2013 BK_{30}	—	January 19, 2004	Kitt Peak	Spacewatch	WIT	990 m	MPC · JPL
731174	2013 BC_{33}	—	January 7, 2013	Kitt Peak	Spacewatch	·	1.2 km	MPC · JPL
731175	2013 BK_{36}	—	June 20, 2010	Mount Lemmon	Mount Lemmon Survey	·	3.5 km	MPC · JPL
731176	2013 BB_{41}	—	October 20, 2007	Mount Lemmon	Mount Lemmon Survey	·	1.3 km	MPC · JPL
731177	2013 BX_{42}	—	October 16, 2003	Anderson Mesa	LONEOS	·	1.4 km	MPC · JPL
731178	2013 BD_{43}	—	September 12, 2002	Palomar	NEAT	·	2.0 km	MPC · JPL
731179	2013 BB_{45}	—	November 26, 2011	Kitt Peak	Spacewatch	L4	9.2 km	MPC · JPL
731180	2013 BP_{47}	—	January 5, 2013	Kitt Peak	Spacewatch	·	1.1 km	MPC · JPL
731181	2013 BD_{48}	—	November 4, 2002	Kitt Peak	Spacewatch	·	1.9 km	MPC · JPL
731182	2013 BJ_{50}	—	May 26, 2009	XuYi	PMO NEO Survey Program	·	1.7 km	MPC · JPL
731183	2013 BP_{50}	—	January 16, 2013	Haleakala	Pan-STARRS 1	·	1.7 km	MPC · JPL
731184	2013 BX_{50}	—	January 16, 2013	Haleakala	Pan-STARRS 1	·	1.3 km	MPC · JPL
731185	2013 BS_{52}	—	March 25, 2001	Kitt Peak	Deep Ecliptic Survey	·	3.0 km	MPC · JPL
731186	2013 BU_{54}	—	January 9, 2013	Kitt Peak	Spacewatch	·	2.0 km	MPC · JPL
731187	2013 BF_{55}	—	January 17, 2013	Mount Lemmon	Mount Lemmon Survey	EUN	940 m	MPC · JPL
731188	2013 BH_{60}	—	January 4, 2013	Kitt Peak	Spacewatch	·	710 m	MPC · JPL
731189	2013 BY_{61}	—	January 18, 2013	Kitt Peak	Spacewatch	·	440 m	MPC · JPL
731190	2013 BN_{62}	—	September 19, 1998	Apache Point	SDSS Collaboration	·	630 m	MPC · JPL
731191	2013 BY_{62}	—	January 18, 2013	Kitt Peak	Spacewatch	3:2	5.4 km	MPC · JPL
731192	2013 BD_{63}	—	January 9, 2013	Kitt Peak	Spacewatch	·	1.0 km	MPC · JPL
731193	2013 BH_{66}	—	January 19, 2013	Kitt Peak	Spacewatch	·	1.4 km	MPC · JPL
731194	2013 BS_{66}	—	January 20, 2013	Kitt Peak	Spacewatch	·	520 m	MPC · JPL
731195	2013 BB_{67}	—	April 17, 2009	Mount Lemmon	Mount Lemmon Survey	BRA	1.5 km	MPC · JPL
731196	2013 BV_{68}	—	October 12, 2010	Mount Lemmon	Mount Lemmon Survey	L4	8.3 km	MPC · JPL
731197	2013 BA_{75}	—	December 7, 2012	Mount Lemmon	Mount Lemmon Survey	L4	6.9 km	MPC · JPL
731198	2013 BO_{79}	—	December 23, 2008	Calar Alto	F. Hormuth	·	2.2 km	MPC · JPL
731199	2013 BN_{80}	—	January 4, 2013	Kitt Peak	Spacewatch	·	1.4 km	MPC · JPL
731200	2013 BV_{82}	—	December 22, 2012	Haleakala	Pan-STARRS 1	L4	7.3 km	MPC · JPL

== 731201–731300 ==
back to top

Designation			Discovery			Properties		Ref
Permanent	Provisional	Named after	Date	Site	Discoverer(s)	Category	Diam.	Ref
731201	2013 BG_{85}	—	February 11, 2010	WISE	WISE	PHO	1.3 km	MPC · JPL
731202	2013 BH_{85}	—	June 2, 2010	WISE	WISE	·	4.2 km	MPC · JPL
731203	2013 BG_{88}	—	February 1, 2010	WISE	WISE	·	1.4 km	MPC · JPL
731204	2013 BQ_{92}	—	January 31, 2013	Mount Lemmon	Mount Lemmon Survey	·	1.7 km	MPC · JPL
731205	2013 BY_{92}	—	January 17, 2013	Kitt Peak	Spacewatch	·	2.9 km	MPC · JPL
731206	2013 BS_{94}	—	January 17, 2013	Haleakala	Pan-STARRS 1	·	1.2 km	MPC · JPL
731207	2013 BO_{97}	—	January 18, 2013	Mount Lemmon	Mount Lemmon Survey	·	1.6 km	MPC · JPL
731208	2013 BW_{99}	—	January 16, 2013	Mount Lemmon	Mount Lemmon Survey	L4	6.8 km	MPC · JPL
731209	2013 BU_{100}	—	January 17, 2013	Haleakala	Pan-STARRS 1	·	1.8 km	MPC · JPL
731210	2013 BZ_{101}	—	November 2, 2010	Mount Lemmon	Mount Lemmon Survey	L4 · ERY	6.4 km	MPC · JPL
731211	2013 BD_{107}	—	January 18, 2013	Mount Lemmon	Mount Lemmon Survey	·	2.8 km	MPC · JPL
731212	2013 CY_{1}	—	January 10, 2013	Haleakala	Pan-STARRS 1	·	1.7 km	MPC · JPL
731213	2013 CH_{3}	—	February 20, 2009	Kitt Peak	Spacewatch	·	1.0 km	MPC · JPL
731214	2013 CY_{3}	—	October 27, 2003	Kitt Peak	Spacewatch	(5)	1.0 km	MPC · JPL
731215	2013 CM_{4}	—	February 2, 2013	Mount Lemmon	Mount Lemmon Survey	GEF	840 m	MPC · JPL
731216	2013 CM_{6}	—	June 8, 2011	Mount Lemmon	Mount Lemmon Survey	JUN	920 m	MPC · JPL
731217	2013 CK_{8}	—	October 14, 2001	Apache Point	SDSS Collaboration	·	620 m	MPC · JPL
731218	2013 CD_{9}	—	September 18, 2003	Palomar	NEAT	·	1.2 km	MPC · JPL
731219	2013 CN_{9}	—	June 26, 2010	WISE	WISE	·	3.3 km	MPC · JPL
731220	2013 CJ_{10}	—	January 17, 2009	Kitt Peak	Spacewatch	·	1.1 km	MPC · JPL
731221	2013 CX_{11}	—	October 4, 2007	Kitt Peak	Spacewatch	·	1.3 km	MPC · JPL
731222	2013 CT_{12}	—	March 16, 2005	Catalina	CSS	·	1.6 km	MPC · JPL
731223	2013 CW_{17}	—	March 15, 2007	Mount Lemmon	Mount Lemmon Survey	THB	2.9 km	MPC · JPL
731224	2013 CA_{21}	—	April 22, 2004	Apache Point	SDSS Collaboration	L4	10 km	MPC · JPL
731225	2013 CC_{26}	—	March 17, 2005	Kitt Peak	Spacewatch	·	1.0 km	MPC · JPL
731226	2013 CO_{26}	—	March 22, 2009	Mount Lemmon	Mount Lemmon Survey	·	1.3 km	MPC · JPL
731227	2013 CU_{26}	—	October 22, 2003	Kitt Peak	Spacewatch	·	1.0 km	MPC · JPL
731228	2013 CG_{28}	—	June 10, 2010	WISE	WISE	URS	3.5 km	MPC · JPL
731229	2013 CJ_{28}	—	October 11, 2010	Mount Lemmon	Mount Lemmon Survey	L4 · ERY	6.0 km	MPC · JPL
731230	2013 CJ_{30}	—	January 19, 2013	Kitt Peak	Spacewatch	L4	7.4 km	MPC · JPL
731231	2013 CC_{31}	—	January 17, 2013	Mount Lemmon	Mount Lemmon Survey	·	1.2 km	MPC · JPL
731232	2013 CT_{31}	—	August 27, 2006	Anderson Mesa	LONEOS	·	2.7 km	MPC · JPL
731233	2013 CO_{33}	—	August 7, 2004	Campo Imperatore	CINEOS	·	3.5 km	MPC · JPL
731234	2013 CE_{34}	—	January 10, 2013	Kitt Peak	Spacewatch	·	1.6 km	MPC · JPL
731235	2013 CD_{37}	—	October 31, 2011	Mayhill-ISON	L. Elenin	·	1.8 km	MPC · JPL
731236	2013 CZ_{37}	—	February 8, 2002	Palomar	NEAT	EUP	4.4 km	MPC · JPL
731237	2013 CL_{42}	—	June 12, 2010	WISE	WISE	HYG	3.0 km	MPC · JPL
731238	2013 CL_{45}	—	February 5, 2013	Kitt Peak	Spacewatch	THM	2.0 km	MPC · JPL
731239	2013 CJ_{47}	—	May 27, 2003	Haleakala	NEAT	ERI	2.3 km	MPC · JPL
731240	2013 CF_{51}	—	July 30, 2005	Palomar	NEAT	·	5.1 km	MPC · JPL
731241	2013 CL_{54}	—	December 20, 2012	Mount Lemmon	Mount Lemmon Survey	(18466)	2.1 km	MPC · JPL
731242	2013 CK_{56}	—	February 7, 2002	Haleakala	NEAT	·	6.0 km	MPC · JPL
731243	2013 CP_{56}	—	February 13, 2002	Kitt Peak	Spacewatch	L4	10 km	MPC · JPL
731244	2013 CZ_{57}	—	September 30, 2005	Mauna Kea	A. Boattini	·	930 m	MPC · JPL
731245	2013 CB_{58}	—	January 9, 2013	Mount Lemmon	Mount Lemmon Survey	·	1.2 km	MPC · JPL
731246	2013 CW_{59}	—	January 8, 2010	WISE	WISE	L4	9.5 km	MPC · JPL
731247	2013 CN_{60}	—	January 17, 2013	Mount Lemmon	Mount Lemmon Survey	·	1.4 km	MPC · JPL
731248	2013 CS_{60}	—	November 3, 2007	Kitt Peak	Spacewatch	·	1.4 km	MPC · JPL
731249	2013 CB_{61}	—	March 19, 2009	Mount Lemmon	Mount Lemmon Survey	·	1.3 km	MPC · JPL
731250	2013 CO_{61}	—	February 5, 2013	Kitt Peak	Spacewatch	·	1.5 km	MPC · JPL
731251	2013 CX_{62}	—	February 8, 2013	Haleakala	Pan-STARRS 1	·	750 m	MPC · JPL
731252	2013 CM_{68}	—	January 26, 2000	Kitt Peak	Spacewatch	·	3.1 km	MPC · JPL
731253	2013 CS_{69}	—	January 13, 2010	WISE	WISE	L4	8.8 km	MPC · JPL
731254	2013 CT_{69}	—	March 2, 2001	Kitt Peak	Spacewatch	·	1.3 km	MPC · JPL
731255	2013 CZ_{69}	—	April 1, 2003	Apache Point	SDSS Collaboration	EOS	2.2 km	MPC · JPL
731256	2013 CD_{72}	—	January 18, 2013	Mount Lemmon	Mount Lemmon Survey	·	1.7 km	MPC · JPL
731257	2013 CJ_{72}	—	September 2, 2005	Palomar	NEAT	·	3.4 km	MPC · JPL
731258	2013 CR_{73}	—	February 5, 2013	Mount Lemmon	Mount Lemmon Survey	VER	4.2 km	MPC · JPL
731259	2013 CM_{74}	—	April 25, 2010	WISE	WISE	KON	2.9 km	MPC · JPL
731260	2013 CE_{77}	—	September 29, 2003	Kitt Peak	Spacewatch	·	5.5 km	MPC · JPL
731261	2013 CV_{77}	—	September 4, 2011	Haleakala	Pan-STARRS 1	·	1.3 km	MPC · JPL
731262	2013 CK_{79}	—	March 25, 2006	Palomar	NEAT	·	2.3 km	MPC · JPL
731263	2013 CT_{84}	—	August 28, 2011	Haleakala	Pan-STARRS 1	·	1.3 km	MPC · JPL
731264	2013 CL_{87}	—	January 10, 2013	Haleakala	Pan-STARRS 1	·	1.5 km	MPC · JPL
731265	2013 CE_{88}	—	October 14, 2009	Bergisch Gladbach	W. Bickel	L4	10 km	MPC · JPL
731266	2013 CP_{90}	—	February 7, 2013	Nogales	M. Schwartz, P. R. Holvorcem	·	1.3 km	MPC · JPL
731267	2013 CF_{99}	—	March 26, 2009	Kitt Peak	Spacewatch	·	1.2 km	MPC · JPL
731268	2013 CG_{100}	—	December 1, 2011	Haleakala	Pan-STARRS 1	EOS	1.4 km	MPC · JPL
731269	2013 CK_{102}	—	February 9, 2013	Haleakala	Pan-STARRS 1	·	2.5 km	MPC · JPL
731270	2013 CP_{102}	—	February 9, 2013	Haleakala	Pan-STARRS 1	·	980 m	MPC · JPL
731271	2013 CB_{103}	—	May 10, 2005	Kitt Peak	Spacewatch	WIT	1.0 km	MPC · JPL
731272	2013 CP_{104}	—	October 28, 2005	Mount Lemmon	Mount Lemmon Survey	·	450 m	MPC · JPL
731273	2013 CZ_{106}	—	February 9, 2013	Haleakala	Pan-STARRS 1	WIT	710 m	MPC · JPL
731274	2013 CW_{107}	—	September 4, 2010	Mount Lemmon	Mount Lemmon Survey	·	2.1 km	MPC · JPL
731275	2013 CE_{112}	—	February 13, 2002	Kitt Peak	Spacewatch	·	3.1 km	MPC · JPL
731276	2013 CO_{114}	—	September 19, 2011	Haleakala	Pan-STARRS 1	·	1.8 km	MPC · JPL
731277	2013 CY_{114}	—	September 23, 2011	Kitt Peak	Spacewatch	·	1.4 km	MPC · JPL
731278	2013 CG_{116}	—	September 2, 2010	Mount Lemmon	Mount Lemmon Survey	·	1.4 km	MPC · JPL
731279	2013 CO_{119}	—	August 25, 2005	Palomar	NEAT	·	2.5 km	MPC · JPL
731280	2013 CN_{120}	—	March 26, 2004	Socorro	LINEAR	·	1.6 km	MPC · JPL
731281	2013 CR_{122}	—	July 20, 2010	WISE	WISE	EUP	3.9 km	MPC · JPL
731282	2013 CJ_{124}	—	January 5, 2013	Kitt Peak	Spacewatch	·	2.0 km	MPC · JPL
731283	2013 CU_{124}	—	November 2, 2011	Kitt Peak	Spacewatch	AEO	1.0 km	MPC · JPL
731284	2013 CD_{126}	—	August 20, 2000	Kitt Peak	Spacewatch	·	2.8 km	MPC · JPL
731285	2013 CN_{126}	—	April 20, 2009	Kitt Peak	Spacewatch	·	3.2 km	MPC · JPL
731286	2013 CU_{126}	—	February 8, 2013	Oukaïmeden	C. Rinner	·	560 m	MPC · JPL
731287	2013 CK_{128}	—	January 20, 2010	WISE	WISE	L4	8.9 km	MPC · JPL
731288	2013 CZ_{129}	—	September 12, 2007	Mount Lemmon	Mount Lemmon Survey	L4	10 km	MPC · JPL
731289	2013 CY_{130}	—	November 3, 2011	Mount Lemmon	Mount Lemmon Survey	·	1.6 km	MPC · JPL
731290	2013 CM_{133}	—	July 30, 2005	Palomar	NEAT	EUP	4.3 km	MPC · JPL
731291	2013 CW_{133}	—	April 12, 2004	Catalina	CSS	·	1.5 km	MPC · JPL
731292	2013 CK_{134}	—	January 20, 2013	Catalina	CSS	·	1.4 km	MPC · JPL
731293	2013 CG_{143}	—	September 29, 2011	Mount Lemmon	Mount Lemmon Survey	·	1.4 km	MPC · JPL
731294	2013 CR_{147}	—	September 22, 2011	Kitt Peak	Spacewatch	·	1.3 km	MPC · JPL
731295	2013 CB_{148}	—	October 28, 2011	Mount Lemmon	Mount Lemmon Survey	·	1.5 km	MPC · JPL
731296	2013 CB_{149}	—	February 5, 2013	Kitt Peak	Spacewatch	·	890 m	MPC · JPL
731297	2013 CQ_{152}	—	February 14, 2013	Haleakala	Pan-STARRS 1	·	490 m	MPC · JPL
731298	2013 CV_{153}	—	September 27, 2005	Palomar	NEAT	(895)	3.5 km	MPC · JPL
731299	2013 CY_{153}	—	February 14, 2013	Haleakala	Pan-STARRS 1	·	1.4 km	MPC · JPL
731300	2013 CZ_{153}	—	October 27, 2006	Mount Lemmon	Mount Lemmon Survey	AST	1.4 km	MPC · JPL

== 731301–731400 ==
back to top

Designation			Discovery			Properties		Ref
Permanent	Provisional	Named after	Date	Site	Discoverer(s)	Category	Diam.	Ref
731301	2013 CS_{155}	—	August 31, 2005	Kitt Peak	Spacewatch	·	1.9 km	MPC · JPL
731302	2013 CE_{157}	—	February 1, 2013	Kitt Peak	Spacewatch	·	600 m	MPC · JPL
731303	2013 CP_{157}	—	January 18, 2008	Mount Lemmon	Mount Lemmon Survey	·	2.1 km	MPC · JPL
731304	2013 CR_{161}	—	March 12, 2002	Kitt Peak	Spacewatch	·	3.4 km	MPC · JPL
731305	2013 CG_{163}	—	October 19, 2011	Kitt Peak	Spacewatch	·	1.4 km	MPC · JPL
731306	2013 CB_{164}	—	January 16, 2004	Kitt Peak	Spacewatch	LEO	1.3 km	MPC · JPL
731307	2013 CP_{164}	—	July 11, 2005	Kitt Peak	Spacewatch	NAE	2.2 km	MPC · JPL
731308	2013 CT_{164}	—	February 14, 2013	Kitt Peak	Spacewatch	·	910 m	MPC · JPL
731309	2013 CE_{168}	—	May 14, 2010	WISE	WISE	·	3.4 km	MPC · JPL
731310	2013 CD_{170}	—	January 10, 2008	Mount Lemmon	Mount Lemmon Survey	AGN	880 m	MPC · JPL
731311	2013 CQ_{171}	—	May 10, 2003	Kitt Peak	Spacewatch	ARM	3.9 km	MPC · JPL
731312	2013 CC_{172}	—	February 15, 2013	Haleakala	Pan-STARRS 1	·	920 m	MPC · JPL
731313	2013 CY_{172}	—	February 13, 2004	Anderson Mesa	LONEOS	·	1.8 km	MPC · JPL
731314	2013 CN_{173}	—	March 26, 2003	Wrightwood	J. W. Young	·	1.8 km	MPC · JPL
731315	2013 CU_{173}	—	February 11, 2013	Oukaïmeden	M. Ory	·	1.2 km	MPC · JPL
731316	2013 CD_{174}	—	April 17, 2009	Kitt Peak	Spacewatch	·	1.7 km	MPC · JPL
731317	2013 CN_{180}	—	January 26, 2010	WISE	WISE	L4	10 km	MPC · JPL
731318	2013 CW_{181}	—	February 16, 2004	Kitt Peak	Spacewatch	NEM	2.4 km	MPC · JPL
731319	2013 CP_{182}	—	January 4, 2013	Kitt Peak	Spacewatch	·	1.2 km	MPC · JPL
731320	2013 CG_{185}	—	November 22, 2006	Mount Lemmon	Mount Lemmon Survey	·	2.9 km	MPC · JPL
731321	2013 CO_{187}	—	March 11, 2002	Palomar	NEAT	·	1.3 km	MPC · JPL
731322	2013 CU_{188}	—	February 12, 2004	Kitt Peak	Spacewatch	·	1.5 km	MPC · JPL
731323	2013 CZ_{189}	—	October 1, 2008	Mount Lemmon	Mount Lemmon Survey	L4	10 km	MPC · JPL
731324	2013 CW_{190}	—	October 5, 2002	Apache Point	SDSS Collaboration	·	1.6 km	MPC · JPL
731325	2013 CH_{194}	—	April 12, 2010	WISE	WISE	·	1.7 km	MPC · JPL
731326	2013 CX_{197}	—	December 19, 2007	Kitt Peak	Spacewatch	·	1.5 km	MPC · JPL
731327	2013 CC_{200}	—	February 9, 2013	Haleakala	Pan-STARRS 1	·	1.4 km	MPC · JPL
731328	2013 CN_{201}	—	January 9, 2013	Kitt Peak	Spacewatch	·	590 m	MPC · JPL
731329	2013 CS_{201}	—	January 10, 1999	Kitt Peak	Spacewatch	·	1.7 km	MPC · JPL
731330	2013 CR_{204}	—	February 9, 2013	Haleakala	Pan-STARRS 1	·	1.0 km	MPC · JPL
731331	2013 CL_{209}	—	December 18, 2007	Kitt Peak	Spacewatch	·	1.6 km	MPC · JPL
731332	2013 CN_{209}	—	February 1, 2013	Haleakala	Pan-STARRS 1	L4	9.2 km	MPC · JPL
731333	2013 CN_{210}	—	September 21, 2009	Mount Lemmon	Mount Lemmon Survey	L4	6.4 km	MPC · JPL
731334	2013 CU_{212}	—	September 24, 2011	Haleakala	Pan-STARRS 1	GEF	1.0 km	MPC · JPL
731335	2013 CB_{214}	—	January 8, 2013	Mount Lemmon	Mount Lemmon Survey	·	1.7 km	MPC · JPL
731336	2013 CL_{224}	—	February 8, 2013	Haleakala	Pan-STARRS 1	·	1.4 km	MPC · JPL
731337	2013 CZ_{224}	—	August 28, 2006	Kitt Peak	Spacewatch	·	2.1 km	MPC · JPL
731338	2013 CO_{225}	—	February 6, 2013	Kitt Peak	Spacewatch	·	1.4 km	MPC · JPL
731339	2013 CW_{225}	—	February 3, 2013	Haleakala	Pan-STARRS 1	·	1.4 km	MPC · JPL
731340	2013 CD_{226}	—	February 5, 2013	Kitt Peak	Spacewatch	·	1.8 km	MPC · JPL
731341	2013 CQ_{227}	—	September 22, 2011	Kitt Peak	Spacewatch	·	1.4 km	MPC · JPL
731342	2013 CH_{230}	—	August 3, 2010	WISE	WISE	·	1.3 km	MPC · JPL
731343	2013 CL_{232}	—	February 14, 2013	Haleakala	Pan-STARRS 1	·	1.5 km	MPC · JPL
731344	2013 CB_{234}	—	March 11, 2018	Haleakala	Pan-STARRS 1	DOR	1.9 km	MPC · JPL
731345	2013 CT_{236}	—	February 9, 2013	Haleakala	Pan-STARRS 1	·	1.4 km	MPC · JPL
731346	2013 CG_{242}	—	February 15, 2013	Haleakala	Pan-STARRS 1	·	500 m	MPC · JPL
731347	2013 CT_{242}	—	February 10, 2013	Haleakala	Pan-STARRS 1	·	530 m	MPC · JPL
731348	2013 CF_{247}	—	February 6, 2013	Kitt Peak	Spacewatch	·	1.5 km	MPC · JPL
731349	2013 CP_{249}	—	February 5, 2013	Kitt Peak	Spacewatch	·	1.4 km	MPC · JPL
731350	2013 CS_{249}	—	February 1, 2013	Kitt Peak	Spacewatch	3:2	4.7 km	MPC · JPL
731351	2013 CC_{254}	—	February 8, 2013	Haleakala	Pan-STARRS 1	·	2.0 km	MPC · JPL
731352	2013 DO	—	May 4, 2005	Mount Lemmon	Mount Lemmon Survey	·	1.7 km	MPC · JPL
731353	2013 DE_{2}	—	February 14, 2010	Kitt Peak	Spacewatch	·	500 m	MPC · JPL
731354	2013 DP_{4}	—	November 7, 2007	Kitt Peak	Spacewatch	(13314)	1.5 km	MPC · JPL
731355	2013 DH_{5}	—	January 17, 2013	Mount Lemmon	Mount Lemmon Survey	WIT	940 m	MPC · JPL
731356	2013 DK_{6}	—	May 2, 2010	WISE	WISE	·	2.2 km	MPC · JPL
731357	2013 DB_{8}	—	November 29, 2003	Kitt Peak	Spacewatch	·	1.2 km	MPC · JPL
731358	2013 DN_{8}	—	July 7, 2010	WISE	WISE	LIX	3.7 km	MPC · JPL
731359	2013 DH_{9}	—	February 13, 2002	Apache Point	SDSS Collaboration	EOS	3.4 km	MPC · JPL
731360	2013 DG_{12}	—	January 5, 2008	Lulin	LUSS	·	3.0 km	MPC · JPL
731361	2013 DS_{14}	—	February 20, 2009	Kitt Peak	Spacewatch	·	1.3 km	MPC · JPL
731362	2013 DH_{15}	—	February 18, 2013	La Silla	La Silla	AGN	860 m	MPC · JPL
731363	2013 DM_{15}	—	February 18, 2004	La Silla	Barbieri, C.	·	2.2 km	MPC · JPL
731364	2013 DA_{17}	—	October 21, 2007	Mount Lemmon	Mount Lemmon Survey	·	1.2 km	MPC · JPL
731365	2013 DB_{21}	—	February 18, 2013	Mount Lemmon	Mount Lemmon Survey	·	950 m	MPC · JPL
731366	2013 EV	—	January 8, 2013	Mount Lemmon	Mount Lemmon Survey	H	550 m	MPC · JPL
731367	2013 EX	—	January 11, 2013	Haleakala	Pan-STARRS 1	·	2.6 km	MPC · JPL
731368	2013 ED_{1}	—	December 6, 2007	Mount Lemmon	Mount Lemmon Survey	·	1.4 km	MPC · JPL
731369	2013 EL_{1}	—	January 28, 2000	Kitt Peak	Spacewatch	·	1.5 km	MPC · JPL
731370	2013 EE_{4}	—	April 22, 2009	Mount Lemmon	Mount Lemmon Survey	NEM	1.7 km	MPC · JPL
731371	2013 EA_{5}	—	December 18, 2001	Kitt Peak	Deep Lens Survey	H	610 m	MPC · JPL
731372	2013 EW_{7}	—	March 3, 2013	Mount Lemmon	Mount Lemmon Survey	MAR	680 m	MPC · JPL
731373	2013 EF_{9}	—	December 19, 2007	Kitt Peak	Spacewatch	·	1.3 km	MPC · JPL
731374	2013 EW_{11}	—	April 1, 2003	Apache Point	SDSS Collaboration	·	2.4 km	MPC · JPL
731375	2013 EC_{13}	—	February 18, 2004	Kitt Peak	Spacewatch	EUN	950 m	MPC · JPL
731376	2013 EU_{13}	—	July 7, 2010	Mount Lemmon	Mount Lemmon Survey	GEF	1.0 km	MPC · JPL
731377	2013 EM_{15}	—	October 2, 2006	Mount Lemmon	Mount Lemmon Survey	·	1.5 km	MPC · JPL
731378	2013 EB_{17}	—	February 8, 2013	Haleakala	Pan-STARRS 1	AGN	930 m	MPC · JPL
731379	2013 EV_{19}	—	September 10, 2007	Mount Lemmon	Mount Lemmon Survey	L4	6.8 km	MPC · JPL
731380	2013 ET_{21}	—	February 11, 2008	Kitt Peak	Spacewatch	·	1.8 km	MPC · JPL
731381	2013 EU_{21}	—	March 5, 2013	Mount Lemmon	Mount Lemmon Survey	MRX	900 m	MPC · JPL
731382	2013 EN_{22}	—	October 24, 2005	Siding Spring	R. H. McNaught	·	2.5 km	MPC · JPL
731383	2013 EV_{22}	—	September 19, 2006	Kitt Peak	Spacewatch	·	1.6 km	MPC · JPL
731384	2013 EZ_{22}	—	October 24, 2011	Haleakala	Pan-STARRS 1	·	1.6 km	MPC · JPL
731385	2013 EG_{24}	—	September 1, 2005	Palomar	NEAT	NAE	4.0 km	MPC · JPL
731386	2013 EY_{25}	—	October 10, 2002	Palomar	NEAT	·	2.0 km	MPC · JPL
731387	2013 ET_{27}	—	January 28, 2004	Kitt Peak	Spacewatch	·	1.6 km	MPC · JPL
731388	2013 EB_{30}	—	February 6, 2013	Kitt Peak	Spacewatch	EUN	880 m	MPC · JPL
731389 Jensdierks	2013 EA_{40}	Jensdierks	March 10, 2013	iTelescope	J. Jahn	·	1.1 km	MPC · JPL
731390	2013 EU_{40}	—	September 21, 2001	Apache Point	SDSS Collaboration	·	690 m	MPC · JPL
731391	2013 EC_{43}	—	September 24, 2011	Haleakala	Pan-STARRS 1	·	1.2 km	MPC · JPL
731392	2013 EK_{46}	—	November 1, 1999	Kitt Peak	Spacewatch	·	3.1 km	MPC · JPL
731393	2013 EH_{52}	—	September 26, 2006	Kitt Peak	Spacewatch	·	1.4 km	MPC · JPL
731394	2013 ER_{57}	—	March 30, 2008	Kitt Peak	Spacewatch	·	2.4 km	MPC · JPL
731395	2013 EM_{58}	—	March 8, 2013	Haleakala	Pan-STARRS 1	·	1.5 km	MPC · JPL
731396	2013 EB_{66}	—	February 5, 2013	Catalina	CSS	·	1.3 km	MPC · JPL
731397	2013 EL_{71}	—	February 15, 2013	Haleakala	Pan-STARRS 1	·	1.1 km	MPC · JPL
731398	2013 EB_{73}	—	February 5, 2013	Kitt Peak	Spacewatch	·	1.6 km	MPC · JPL
731399	2013 EY_{75}	—	October 2, 2006	Mount Lemmon	Mount Lemmon Survey	HOF	2.0 km	MPC · JPL
731400	2013 EH_{76}	—	March 8, 2013	Haleakala	Pan-STARRS 1	·	990 m	MPC · JPL

== 731401–731500 ==
back to top

Designation			Discovery			Properties		Ref
Permanent	Provisional	Named after	Date	Site	Discoverer(s)	Category	Diam.	Ref
731401	2013 EV_{79}	—	February 19, 2013	Kitt Peak	Spacewatch	·	1.5 km	MPC · JPL
731402	2013 EN_{81}	—	July 17, 2010	WISE	WISE	EOS	1.8 km	MPC · JPL
731403	2013 EX_{83}	—	October 18, 2011	Mount Lemmon	Mount Lemmon Survey	·	860 m	MPC · JPL
731404	2013 EY_{84}	—	February 5, 2013	Kitt Peak	Spacewatch	·	550 m	MPC · JPL
731405	2013 EO_{88}	—	August 12, 2006	Palomar	NEAT	·	1.6 km	MPC · JPL
731406	2013 EY_{92}	—	February 12, 2004	Palomar	NEAT	ADE	3.7 km	MPC · JPL
731407	2013 EL_{95}	—	March 8, 2013	Haleakala	Pan-STARRS 1	·	1.5 km	MPC · JPL
731408	2013 EH_{98}	—	September 18, 2006	Kitt Peak	Spacewatch	·	1.4 km	MPC · JPL
731409	2013 EJ_{98}	—	October 23, 2006	Mount Lemmon	Mount Lemmon Survey	KOR	1.1 km	MPC · JPL
731410	2013 ES_{98}	—	March 8, 2013	Haleakala	Pan-STARRS 1	·	2.3 km	MPC · JPL
731411	2013 EG_{100}	—	December 15, 2007	Mount Lemmon	Mount Lemmon Survey	·	1.3 km	MPC · JPL
731412	2013 EW_{100}	—	October 8, 2008	Kitt Peak	Spacewatch	·	470 m	MPC · JPL
731413	2013 EV_{103}	—	December 15, 2006	Kitt Peak	Spacewatch	EOS	2.2 km	MPC · JPL
731414	2013 EA_{106}	—	October 8, 2010	Kitt Peak	Spacewatch	·	2.0 km	MPC · JPL
731415	2013 EH_{106}	—	June 15, 2010	Mount Lemmon	Mount Lemmon Survey	·	660 m	MPC · JPL
731416	2013 EZ_{106}	—	April 15, 2004	Palomar	NEAT	·	2.9 km	MPC · JPL
731417	2013 EG_{108}	—	October 24, 2011	Haleakala	Pan-STARRS 1	·	1.3 km	MPC · JPL
731418	2013 EY_{109}	—	October 29, 2000	Hubble Space Telescope	Hubble Space Telescope	·	3.3 km	MPC · JPL
731419	2013 EU_{115}	—	November 25, 2006	Kitt Peak	Spacewatch	·	2.0 km	MPC · JPL
731420	2013 ED_{117}	—	March 14, 2013	Kitt Peak	Spacewatch	·	1.2 km	MPC · JPL
731421	2013 EK_{118}	—	September 1, 2005	Campo Imperatore	CINEOS	·	3.3 km	MPC · JPL
731422	2013 ET_{118}	—	December 30, 2007	Kitt Peak	Spacewatch	GEF	1.0 km	MPC · JPL
731423	2013 EJ_{119}	—	March 5, 2013	Haleakala	Pan-STARRS 1	·	2.1 km	MPC · JPL
731424	2013 EL_{122}	—	June 17, 2010	Mount Lemmon	Mount Lemmon Survey	·	560 m	MPC · JPL
731425	2013 EE_{124}	—	November 22, 2000	Haleakala	NEAT	TIR	3.6 km	MPC · JPL
731426	2013 EH_{124}	—	March 6, 2008	Mount Lemmon	Mount Lemmon Survey	VER	3.3 km	MPC · JPL
731427	2013 EO_{124}	—	April 8, 2002	Palomar	NEAT	·	3.2 km	MPC · JPL
731428	2013 EG_{128}	—	March 3, 2008	Catalina	CSS	·	2.0 km	MPC · JPL
731429	2013 ET_{130}	—	March 12, 2013	Kitt Peak	Research and Education Collaborative Occultation Network	·	1.5 km	MPC · JPL
731430	2013 EU_{136}	—	November 5, 2007	Kitt Peak	Spacewatch	·	840 m	MPC · JPL
731431	2013 EY_{136}	—	March 13, 2013	Kitt Peak	Research and Education Collaborative Occultation Network	DOR	1.8 km	MPC · JPL
731432	2013 EL_{139}	—	February 5, 2013	Mount Lemmon	Mount Lemmon Survey	·	1.2 km	MPC · JPL
731433	2013 EB_{148}	—	September 16, 2003	Kitt Peak	Spacewatch	·	2.4 km	MPC · JPL
731434	2013 EK_{148}	—	December 19, 2007	Kitt Peak	Spacewatch	·	900 m	MPC · JPL
731435	2013 EP_{154}	—	March 8, 2013	Haleakala	Pan-STARRS 1	AGN	1.0 km	MPC · JPL
731436	2013 ES_{154}	—	February 15, 2013	Haleakala	Pan-STARRS 1	·	460 m	MPC · JPL
731437	2013 ES_{155}	—	January 13, 2008	Kitt Peak	Spacewatch	·	1.5 km	MPC · JPL
731438	2013 EW_{155}	—	March 5, 2008	Mount Lemmon	Mount Lemmon Survey	·	1.7 km	MPC · JPL
731439	2013 EF_{156}	—	March 13, 2013	Haleakala	Pan-STARRS 1	·	1.4 km	MPC · JPL
731440	2013 ED_{157}	—	January 11, 2008	Kitt Peak	Spacewatch	·	1.5 km	MPC · JPL
731441	2013 EF_{157}	—	October 3, 2011	Mount Lemmon	Mount Lemmon Survey	(1338) (FLO)	470 m	MPC · JPL
731442	2013 EE_{158}	—	October 22, 2011	Mount Lemmon	Mount Lemmon Survey	·	630 m	MPC · JPL
731443	2013 EM_{158}	—	September 28, 2006	Kitt Peak	Spacewatch	·	1.5 km	MPC · JPL
731444	2013 EQ_{163}	—	October 29, 2017	Haleakala	Pan-STARRS 1	·	2.3 km	MPC · JPL
731445	2013 EA_{168}	—	March 8, 2013	Haleakala	Pan-STARRS 1	MRX	810 m	MPC · JPL
731446	2013 EB_{168}	—	March 5, 2013	Haleakala	Pan-STARRS 1	V	510 m	MPC · JPL
731447	2013 EE_{168}	—	March 4, 2013	Haleakala	Pan-STARRS 1	·	2.5 km	MPC · JPL
731448	2013 EP_{170}	—	March 3, 2013	Mount Lemmon	Mount Lemmon Survey	·	510 m	MPC · JPL
731449	2013 EY_{171}	—	March 6, 2013	Haleakala	Pan-STARRS 1	·	1.2 km	MPC · JPL
731450	2013 EW_{173}	—	March 5, 2013	Mount Lemmon	Mount Lemmon Survey	WIT	680 m	MPC · JPL
731451	2013 EX_{183}	—	March 5, 2013	Haleakala	Pan-STARRS 1	AGN	950 m	MPC · JPL
731452	2013 FK_{7}	—	October 26, 2011	Mayhill-ISON	L. Elenin	·	3.5 km	MPC · JPL
731453	2013 FQ_{13}	—	July 12, 2010	WISE	WISE	·	2.1 km	MPC · JPL
731454	2013 FM_{15}	—	October 23, 2011	Haleakala	Pan-STARRS 1	·	1.5 km	MPC · JPL
731455	2013 FG_{17}	—	October 5, 2002	Apache Point	SDSS Collaboration	EUN	1.2 km	MPC · JPL
731456	2013 FH_{17}	—	October 10, 2002	Apache Point	SDSS Collaboration	·	1.6 km	MPC · JPL
731457	2013 FZ_{19}	—	March 11, 2005	Kitt Peak	Spacewatch	3:2	4.9 km	MPC · JPL
731458	2013 FU_{25}	—	April 1, 2003	Apache Point	SDSS Collaboration	TRE	2.9 km	MPC · JPL
731459	2013 FA_{26}	—	April 4, 2013	Palomar	Palomar Transient Factory	·	1.8 km	MPC · JPL
731460	2013 FK_{26}	—	October 29, 2002	Apache Point	SDSS Collaboration	·	1.9 km	MPC · JPL
731461	2013 FV_{26}	—	March 19, 2013	Haleakala	Pan-STARRS 1	·	520 m	MPC · JPL
731462	2013 FG_{27}	—	March 12, 2013	Kitt Peak	Spacewatch	·	670 m	MPC · JPL
731463	2013 FT_{27}	—	March 16, 2013	Mount Lemmon	Mount Lemmon Survey	·	570 m	MPC · JPL
731464	2013 FU_{27}	—	January 18, 2008	Mount Lemmon	Mount Lemmon Survey	·	2.1 km	MPC · JPL
731465	2013 FC_{29}	—	March 19, 2013	Haleakala	Pan-STARRS 1	AGN	990 m	MPC · JPL
731466	2013 FP_{30}	—	July 6, 2010	WISE	WISE	·	1.8 km	MPC · JPL
731467	2013 FY_{31}	—	March 17, 2013	Mount Lemmon	Mount Lemmon Survey	·	1.2 km	MPC · JPL
731468	2013 FV_{33}	—	March 17, 2013	Palomar	Palomar Transient Factory	3:2 · SHU	4.4 km	MPC · JPL
731469	2013 FK_{35}	—	March 19, 2013	Haleakala	Pan-STARRS 1	·	2.8 km	MPC · JPL
731470	2013 FA_{37}	—	March 17, 2013	Kitt Peak	Spacewatch	·	1.5 km	MPC · JPL
731471	2013 FD_{41}	—	March 17, 2013	Mount Lemmon	Mount Lemmon Survey	·	1.2 km	MPC · JPL
731472	2013 GD	—	April 1, 2013	Kitt Peak	Spacewatch	·	530 m	MPC · JPL
731473	2013 GS_{2}	—	February 3, 2013	Haleakala	Pan-STARRS 1	·	1.3 km	MPC · JPL
731474	2013 GC_{6}	—	March 7, 2013	Kitt Peak	Spacewatch	·	1.6 km	MPC · JPL
731475	2013 GQ_{8}	—	October 14, 2001	Socorro	LINEAR	·	2.7 km	MPC · JPL
731476	2013 GE_{9}	—	November 7, 2005	Mauna Kea	A. Boattini	·	590 m	MPC · JPL
731477	2013 GN_{10}	—	June 8, 2010	WISE	WISE	·	1.1 km	MPC · JPL
731478	2013 GQ_{11}	—	April 2, 2013	Haleakala	Pan-STARRS 1	·	2.9 km	MPC · JPL
731479	2013 GE_{14}	—	March 13, 2013	Palomar	Palomar Transient Factory	EUN	930 m	MPC · JPL
731480	2013 GZ_{14}	—	August 5, 2010	WISE	WISE	·	2.4 km	MPC · JPL
731481	2013 GX_{24}	—	February 7, 1999	Kitt Peak	Spacewatch	·	1.7 km	MPC · JPL
731482	2013 GE_{25}	—	October 13, 2007	Catalina	CSS	PHO	1.4 km	MPC · JPL
731483	2013 GM_{26}	—	October 4, 2002	Apache Point	SDSS Collaboration	·	1.2 km	MPC · JPL
731484	2013 GT_{36}	—	April 1, 2013	Mount Lemmon	Mount Lemmon Survey	·	970 m	MPC · JPL
731485	2013 GO_{45}	—	April 5, 2013	Palomar	Palomar Transient Factory	ADE	2.0 km	MPC · JPL
731486	2013 GA_{46}	—	March 19, 2013	Haleakala	Pan-STARRS 1	NEM	1.9 km	MPC · JPL
731487	2013 GO_{50}	—	February 7, 2008	Mount Lemmon	Mount Lemmon Survey	·	1.6 km	MPC · JPL
731488	2013 GS_{50}	—	January 13, 2008	Kitt Peak	Spacewatch	·	1.3 km	MPC · JPL
731489	2013 GT_{54}	—	October 1, 2010	Mount Lemmon	Mount Lemmon Survey	·	1.7 km	MPC · JPL
731490	2013 GU_{57}	—	March 19, 2013	Haleakala	Pan-STARRS 1	·	1.3 km	MPC · JPL
731491	2013 GJ_{58}	—	March 17, 2004	Apache Point	SDSS Collaboration	·	1.8 km	MPC · JPL
731492	2013 GG_{60}	—	April 6, 2013	Mount Lemmon	Mount Lemmon Survey	AGN	940 m	MPC · JPL
731493	2013 GC_{62}	—	March 4, 2008	Kitt Peak	Spacewatch	AST	1.8 km	MPC · JPL
731494	2013 GH_{62}	—	April 7, 2013	Mount Lemmon	Mount Lemmon Survey	·	540 m	MPC · JPL
731495	2013 GW_{64}	—	March 16, 2013	Kitt Peak	Spacewatch	·	610 m	MPC · JPL
731496	2013 GM_{68}	—	March 13, 2002	Kitt Peak	Spacewatch	·	970 m	MPC · JPL
731497	2013 GU_{69}	—	October 18, 2001	Kitt Peak	Spacewatch	AGN	1.3 km	MPC · JPL
731498	2013 GY_{71}	—	July 19, 2010	WISE	WISE	·	5.1 km	MPC · JPL
731499	2013 GD_{73}	—	April 11, 2013	Mount Lemmon	Mount Lemmon Survey	·	540 m	MPC · JPL
731500	2013 GZ_{78}	—	May 4, 2006	Mount Lemmon	Mount Lemmon Survey	PHO	2.0 km	MPC · JPL

== 731501–731600 ==
back to top

Designation			Discovery			Properties		Ref
Permanent	Provisional	Named after	Date	Site	Discoverer(s)	Category	Diam.	Ref
731501	2013 GT_{81}	—	December 11, 2004	Kitt Peak	Spacewatch	·	5.1 km	MPC · JPL
731502	2013 GG_{88}	—	May 11, 2005	Palomar	NEAT	·	1.8 km	MPC · JPL
731503	2013 GB_{89}	—	February 22, 2007	Catalina	CSS	·	3.9 km	MPC · JPL
731504	2013 GG_{90}	—	October 21, 2003	Palomar	NEAT	T_{j} (2.99) · EUP	5.3 km	MPC · JPL
731505	2013 GJ_{91}	—	January 16, 2010	WISE	WISE	LIX	3.8 km	MPC · JPL
731506	2013 GR_{97}	—	June 18, 2010	WISE	WISE	·	1.2 km	MPC · JPL
731507	2013 GS_{99}	—	April 7, 2013	Mount Lemmon	Mount Lemmon Survey	·	1.8 km	MPC · JPL
731508	2013 GY_{107}	—	July 17, 2010	WISE	WISE	PHO	2.5 km	MPC · JPL
731509	2013 GJ_{111}	—	June 27, 2010	WISE	WISE	·	970 m	MPC · JPL
731510	2013 GN_{114}	—	February 3, 2009	Mount Lemmon	Mount Lemmon Survey	·	1.9 km	MPC · JPL
731511	2013 GY_{114}	—	March 31, 2013	Palomar	Palomar Transient Factory	H	510 m	MPC · JPL
731512	2013 GY_{118}	—	April 7, 2013	Mount Lemmon	Mount Lemmon Survey	KOR	1.2 km	MPC · JPL
731513	2013 GM_{122}	—	August 28, 2014	Haleakala	Pan-STARRS 1	·	1.5 km	MPC · JPL
731514	2013 GT_{125}	—	March 23, 2003	Apache Point	SDSS Collaboration	·	1.7 km	MPC · JPL
731515	2013 GM_{129}	—	March 8, 2013	Haleakala	Pan-STARRS 1	·	1.7 km	MPC · JPL
731516	2013 GM_{139}	—	October 2, 2010	Mount Lemmon	Mount Lemmon Survey	·	1.4 km	MPC · JPL
731517	2013 GV_{139}	—	April 14, 2013	Mount Lemmon	Mount Lemmon Survey	V	430 m	MPC · JPL
731518	2013 GW_{140}	—	April 13, 2013	Haleakala	Pan-STARRS 1	·	1.6 km	MPC · JPL
731519	2013 GY_{140}	—	January 20, 2012	Mount Lemmon	Mount Lemmon Survey	GEF	1.0 km	MPC · JPL
731520	2013 GO_{143}	—	June 30, 2014	Haleakala	Pan-STARRS 1	TIN	930 m	MPC · JPL
731521	2013 GR_{157}	—	April 6, 2013	Mount Lemmon	Mount Lemmon Survey	·	1.4 km	MPC · JPL
731522	2013 GH_{166}	—	April 10, 2013	Haleakala	Pan-STARRS 1	·	1.3 km	MPC · JPL
731523	2013 HM_{1}	—	November 14, 2006	Mount Lemmon	Mount Lemmon Survey	GEF	1.1 km	MPC · JPL
731524	2013 HC_{2}	—	January 12, 2002	Kitt Peak	Spacewatch	615	1.7 km	MPC · JPL
731525	2013 HT_{5}	—	December 6, 2011	Haleakala	Pan-STARRS 1	·	2.5 km	MPC · JPL
731526	2013 HX_{5}	—	July 25, 2003	Palomar	NEAT	·	1.2 km	MPC · JPL
731527	2013 HX_{6}	—	September 18, 2003	Palomar	NEAT	·	3.9 km	MPC · JPL
731528	2013 HL_{7}	—	April 19, 2006	Catalina	CSS	PHO	990 m	MPC · JPL
731529	2013 HH_{11}	—	January 16, 2004	Palomar	NEAT	·	1.8 km	MPC · JPL
731530	2013 HA_{12}	—	July 26, 2010	WISE	WISE	·	3.2 km	MPC · JPL
731531	2013 HQ_{13}	—	October 23, 2011	Haleakala	Pan-STARRS 1	·	1.9 km	MPC · JPL
731532	2013 HE_{16}	—	December 30, 2008	Mount Lemmon	Mount Lemmon Survey	·	560 m	MPC · JPL
731533	2013 HY_{17}	—	March 16, 2013	Kitt Peak	Spacewatch	·	1.3 km	MPC · JPL
731534	2013 HH_{20}	—	July 5, 2010	WISE	WISE	·	3.8 km	MPC · JPL
731535	2013 HE_{23}	—	June 19, 2006	Mount Lemmon	Mount Lemmon Survey	ERI	2.3 km	MPC · JPL
731536	2013 HU_{25}	—	January 19, 2012	Mount Lemmon	Mount Lemmon Survey	·	2.5 km	MPC · JPL
731537	2013 HO_{28}	—	May 13, 2002	Socorro	LINEAR	·	2.3 km	MPC · JPL
731538	2013 HR_{29}	—	April 16, 2013	Cerro Tololo-DECam	DECam	·	1.6 km	MPC · JPL
731539	2013 HB_{33}	—	April 16, 2013	Cerro Tololo-DECam	DECam	·	1.2 km	MPC · JPL
731540	2013 HN_{40}	—	April 9, 2013	Haleakala	Pan-STARRS 1	GEF	810 m	MPC · JPL
731541	2013 HS_{52}	—	February 2, 2008	Kitt Peak	Spacewatch	MRX	820 m	MPC · JPL
731542	2013 HV_{54}	—	October 21, 2006	Kitt Peak	Spacewatch	·	1.5 km	MPC · JPL
731543	2013 HL_{56}	—	April 16, 2013	Cerro Tololo-DECam	DECam	·	500 m	MPC · JPL
731544	2013 HU_{61}	—	October 27, 2005	Mount Lemmon	Mount Lemmon Survey	·	1.6 km	MPC · JPL
731545	2013 HW_{61}	—	January 2, 2012	Mount Lemmon	Mount Lemmon Survey	VER	2.3 km	MPC · JPL
731546	2013 HX_{68}	—	November 1, 2010	Mount Lemmon	Mount Lemmon Survey	·	1.2 km	MPC · JPL
731547	2013 HE_{77}	—	May 13, 2010	WISE	WISE	·	1.9 km	MPC · JPL
731548	2013 HN_{82}	—	September 10, 2010	Kitt Peak	Spacewatch	·	1.6 km	MPC · JPL
731549	2013 HC_{85}	—	April 16, 2013	Cerro Tololo-DECam	DECam	HOF	2.0 km	MPC · JPL
731550	2013 HL_{89}	—	April 16, 2013	Cerro Tololo-DECam	DECam	·	1.3 km	MPC · JPL
731551	2013 HZ_{90}	—	April 16, 2013	Cerro Tololo-DECam	DECam	·	980 m	MPC · JPL
731552	2013 HT_{94}	—	April 10, 2013	Haleakala	Pan-STARRS 1	·	1.3 km	MPC · JPL
731553	2013 HZ_{100}	—	April 16, 2013	Cerro Tololo-DECam	DECam	PAD	1.1 km	MPC · JPL
731554	2013 HK_{106}	—	April 10, 2013	Haleakala	Pan-STARRS 1	AST	1.2 km	MPC · JPL
731555	2013 HE_{111}	—	September 28, 2010	Kitt Peak	Spacewatch	·	1.4 km	MPC · JPL
731556	2013 HE_{116}	—	October 12, 2010	Bergisch Gladbach	W. Bickel	AGN	880 m	MPC · JPL
731557	2013 HK_{116}	—	February 28, 2008	Mount Lemmon	Mount Lemmon Survey	·	1.4 km	MPC · JPL
731558	2013 HM_{116}	—	April 10, 2013	Haleakala	Pan-STARRS 1	·	1.3 km	MPC · JPL
731559	2013 HX_{120}	—	October 8, 2010	Kitt Peak	Spacewatch	·	690 m	MPC · JPL
731560	2013 HS_{123}	—	July 7, 2010	WISE	WISE	·	1.8 km	MPC · JPL
731561	2013 HZ_{127}	—	January 16, 2005	Mauna Kea	Veillet, C.	·	1.4 km	MPC · JPL
731562	2013 HE_{128}	—	April 17, 2013	Cerro Tololo-DECam	DECam	·	1.4 km	MPC · JPL
731563	2013 HP_{141}	—	November 12, 2006	Mount Lemmon	Mount Lemmon Survey	·	1.2 km	MPC · JPL
731564	2013 HA_{147}	—	April 16, 2013	Cerro Tololo-DECam	DECam	KOR	810 m	MPC · JPL
731565	2013 HN_{155}	—	March 27, 2008	Mount Lemmon	Mount Lemmon Survey	KOR	950 m	MPC · JPL
731566	2013 JP_{1}	—	April 9, 2003	Kitt Peak	Spacewatch	·	680 m	MPC · JPL
731567	2013 JG_{3}	—	April 9, 2013	Haleakala	Pan-STARRS 1	·	880 m	MPC · JPL
731568	2013 JK_{4}	—	May 4, 2013	Elena Remote	Oreshko, A.	·	550 m	MPC · JPL
731569	2013 JN_{11}	—	May 1, 2013	Mount Lemmon	Mount Lemmon Survey	·	510 m	MPC · JPL
731570	2013 JD_{14}	—	April 18, 2002	Kitt Peak	Spacewatch	THM	1.7 km	MPC · JPL
731571	2013 JE_{19}	—	May 8, 2013	Haleakala	Pan-STARRS 1	·	1.3 km	MPC · JPL
731572	2013 JP_{20}	—	April 15, 2013	Haleakala	Pan-STARRS 1	·	550 m	MPC · JPL
731573	2013 JR_{21}	—	September 30, 2003	Kitt Peak	Spacewatch	·	3.6 km	MPC · JPL
731574	2013 JQ_{23}	—	April 9, 2002	Palomar	NEAT	EOS	1.6 km	MPC · JPL
731575	2013 JF_{24}	—	April 11, 2013	XuYi	PMO NEO Survey Program	·	700 m	MPC · JPL
731576	2013 JD_{25}	—	October 18, 2003	Palomar	NEAT	·	4.8 km	MPC · JPL
731577	2013 JF_{25}	—	January 1, 2009	Kitt Peak	Spacewatch	PHO	800 m	MPC · JPL
731578	2013 JM_{27}	—	March 12, 2000	Catalina	CSS	·	1.5 km	MPC · JPL
731579	2013 JS_{29}	—	April 14, 2002	Socorro	LINEAR	·	2.1 km	MPC · JPL
731580	2013 JH_{33}	—	January 18, 2004	Catalina	CSS	·	4.1 km	MPC · JPL
731581	2013 JS_{39}	—	January 28, 2010	WISE	WISE	EUP	5.0 km	MPC · JPL
731582	2013 JZ_{39}	—	October 23, 2003	Apache Point	SDSS	·	810 m	MPC · JPL
731583	2013 JG_{42}	—	July 29, 2005	Palomar	NEAT	·	3.0 km	MPC · JPL
731584	2013 JK_{43}	—	June 4, 2000	Anderson Mesa	LONEOS	·	2.0 km	MPC · JPL
731585	2013 JV_{45}	—	October 16, 2007	Mount Lemmon	Mount Lemmon Survey	·	1.4 km	MPC · JPL
731586	2013 JL_{49}	—	April 9, 2013	Haleakala	Pan-STARRS 1	·	1.9 km	MPC · JPL
731587	2013 JQ_{49}	—	May 1, 2013	Mount Lemmon	Mount Lemmon Survey	KOR	1.0 km	MPC · JPL
731588	2013 JH_{54}	—	May 8, 2013	Haleakala	Pan-STARRS 1	·	1.0 km	MPC · JPL
731589	2013 JD_{58}	—	October 24, 2003	Apache Point	SDSS Collaboration	·	3.2 km	MPC · JPL
731590	2013 JM_{59}	—	October 16, 2003	Kitt Peak	Spacewatch	PHO	720 m	MPC · JPL
731591	2013 JP_{59}	—	April 11, 2013	ESA OGS	ESA OGS	·	1.6 km	MPC · JPL
731592	2013 JF_{62}	—	April 13, 2013	Haleakala	Pan-STARRS 1	526	2.0 km	MPC · JPL
731593	2013 JK_{63}	—	September 1, 2005	Kitt Peak	Spacewatch	JUN	870 m	MPC · JPL
731594	2013 JW_{74}	—	May 8, 2013	Haleakala	Pan-STARRS 1	·	930 m	MPC · JPL
731595	2013 JV_{76}	—	May 8, 2013	Haleakala	Pan-STARRS 1	·	1.5 km	MPC · JPL
731596	2013 KZ_{12}	—	April 14, 2009	Zelenchukskaya	T. V. Krjačko	MAS	710 m	MPC · JPL
731597	2013 KC_{13}	—	May 18, 2013	Mount Lemmon	Mount Lemmon Survey	·	1.5 km	MPC · JPL
731598	2013 KN_{14}	—	April 15, 2013	Haleakala	Pan-STARRS 1	·	2.1 km	MPC · JPL
731599	2013 KN_{15}	—	September 7, 2004	Socorro	LINEAR	·	1 km	MPC · JPL
731600	2013 KS_{18}	—	April 20, 2006	Mount Lemmon	Mount Lemmon Survey	PHO	1.3 km	MPC · JPL

== 731601–731700 ==
back to top

Designation			Discovery			Properties		Ref
Permanent	Provisional	Named after	Date	Site	Discoverer(s)	Category	Diam.	Ref
731601	2013 KN_{19}	—	May 16, 2013	Haleakala	Pan-STARRS 1	·	590 m	MPC · JPL
731602	2013 KR_{19}	—	July 1, 2008	Kitt Peak	Spacewatch	T_{j} (2.98)	4.8 km	MPC · JPL
731603	2013 LG_{2}	—	April 15, 2013	Haleakala	Pan-STARRS 1	·	550 m	MPC · JPL
731604	2013 LK_{2}	—	September 15, 2007	Kitt Peak	Spacewatch	·	570 m	MPC · JPL
731605	2013 LU_{2}	—	April 6, 2008	Mount Lemmon	Mount Lemmon Survey	·	1.8 km	MPC · JPL
731606	2013 LS_{8}	—	April 16, 2013	Haleakala	Pan-STARRS 1	·	570 m	MPC · JPL
731607	2013 LQ_{11}	—	June 11, 2004	Palomar	NEAT	·	2.2 km	MPC · JPL
731608	2013 LA_{14}	—	May 16, 2013	Haleakala	Pan-STARRS 1	·	2.9 km	MPC · JPL
731609	2013 LK_{15}	—	May 17, 2013	Nogales	M. Schwartz, P. R. Holvorcem	·	1.9 km	MPC · JPL
731610	2013 LW_{19}	—	June 30, 2001	Palomar	NEAT	·	2.0 km	MPC · JPL
731611	2013 LD_{20}	—	June 1, 2013	Mount Lemmon	Mount Lemmon Survey	·	2.8 km	MPC · JPL
731612	2013 LS_{27}	—	January 17, 2007	Kitt Peak	Spacewatch	·	1.7 km	MPC · JPL
731613	2013 LZ_{27}	—	April 11, 2002	Socorro	LINEAR	·	1.3 km	MPC · JPL
731614	2013 LW_{30}	—	October 29, 2002	Apache Point	SDSS Collaboration	·	2.9 km	MPC · JPL
731615	2013 LB_{34}	—	July 4, 2003	Kitt Peak	Spacewatch	·	4.5 km	MPC · JPL
731616	2013 LL_{35}	—	May 8, 2003	Haleakala	NEAT	·	2.3 km	MPC · JPL
731617	2013 LP_{39}	—	January 31, 2016	Haleakala	Pan-STARRS 1	EUN	960 m	MPC · JPL
731618	2013 LN_{43}	—	June 7, 2013	Haleakala	Pan-STARRS 1	·	770 m	MPC · JPL
731619	2013 LJ_{45}	—	June 4, 2013	Haleakala	Pan-STARRS 1	·	1.4 km	MPC · JPL
731620	2013 MB_{4}	—	August 28, 2009	Kitt Peak	Spacewatch	·	1.3 km	MPC · JPL
731621	2013 ME_{4}	—	June 18, 2013	Mount Lemmon	Mount Lemmon Survey	PHO	950 m	MPC · JPL
731622	2013 MT_{4}	—	September 18, 2003	Kitt Peak	Spacewatch	·	710 m	MPC · JPL
731623	2013 MV_{4}	—	December 19, 2004	Mount Lemmon	Mount Lemmon Survey	·	4.7 km	MPC · JPL
731624	2013 MD_{7}	—	December 13, 2006	Kitt Peak	Spacewatch	H	480 m	MPC · JPL
731625	2013 MT_{7}	—	September 26, 2006	Mount Lemmon	Mount Lemmon Survey	MAS	1.0 km	MPC · JPL
731626	2013 MK_{8}	—	May 10, 2005	Mount Lemmon	Mount Lemmon Survey	MAS	730 m	MPC · JPL
731627	2013 MR_{8}	—	September 27, 2009	Mount Lemmon	Mount Lemmon Survey	EUP	5.8 km	MPC · JPL
731628	2013 MZ_{8}	—	January 4, 2010	Kitt Peak	Spacewatch	·	2.3 km	MPC · JPL
731629	2013 MH_{12}	—	January 8, 2010	Kitt Peak	Spacewatch	·	3.7 km	MPC · JPL
731630	2013 MU_{12}	—	June 17, 2013	Haleakala	Pan-STARRS 1	·	1.2 km	MPC · JPL
731631	2013 MM_{18}	—	June 18, 2013	Haleakala	Pan-STARRS 1	·	1.7 km	MPC · JPL
731632	2013 MZ_{18}	—	June 18, 2013	Haleakala	Pan-STARRS 1	ADE	1.8 km	MPC · JPL
731633	2013 NQ_{1}	—	July 1, 2013	Haleakala	Pan-STARRS 1	·	580 m	MPC · JPL
731634	2013 NX_{4}	—	October 25, 2003	Kitt Peak	Spacewatch	·	4.1 km	MPC · JPL
731635	2013 NL_{6}	—	January 13, 2011	Mount Lemmon	Mount Lemmon Survey	EOS	1.4 km	MPC · JPL
731636	2013 NZ_{6}	—	August 3, 2002	Palomar	NEAT	·	5.1 km	MPC · JPL
731637	2013 NP_{16}	—	August 19, 2006	Kitt Peak	Spacewatch	ERI	1.1 km	MPC · JPL
731638	2013 NL_{17}	—	September 24, 2009	Mount Lemmon	Mount Lemmon Survey	URS	3.3 km	MPC · JPL
731639	2013 NH_{20}	—	December 18, 2009	Kitt Peak	Spacewatch	·	3.5 km	MPC · JPL
731640	2013 NU_{21}	—	January 15, 2010	Mount Lemmon	Mount Lemmon Survey	·	3.3 km	MPC · JPL
731641	2013 NB_{23}	—	February 8, 2010	Kitt Peak	Spacewatch	·	3.6 km	MPC · JPL
731642	2013 NS_{24}	—	August 24, 2012	Kitt Peak	Spacewatch	L5	6.6 km	MPC · JPL
731643	2013 NU_{24}	—	April 1, 2010	WISE	WISE	·	2.1 km	MPC · JPL
731644	2013 ND_{25}	—	November 6, 2009	Pla D'Arguines	R. Ferrando, Ferrando, M.	·	2.0 km	MPC · JPL
731645	2013 NJ_{30}	—	July 14, 2013	Haleakala	Pan-STARRS 1	·	1.3 km	MPC · JPL
731646	2013 NW_{32}	—	August 28, 2006	Kitt Peak	Spacewatch	·	680 m	MPC · JPL
731647	2013 NT_{39}	—	October 2, 2008	Mount Lemmon	Mount Lemmon Survey	·	2.1 km	MPC · JPL
731648	2013 NV_{40}	—	July 15, 2013	Haleakala	Pan-STARRS 1	·	1.5 km	MPC · JPL
731649	2013 NQ_{42}	—	June 10, 2018	Haleakala	Pan-STARRS 1	·	1.6 km	MPC · JPL
731650	2013 ND_{43}	—	March 6, 2016	Haleakala	Pan-STARRS 1	·	500 m	MPC · JPL
731651	2013 NC_{49}	—	July 15, 2013	Haleakala	Pan-STARRS 1	·	2.3 km	MPC · JPL
731652	2013 ND_{49}	—	September 28, 2009	Mount Lemmon	Mount Lemmon Survey	AGN	1.1 km	MPC · JPL
731653	2013 NE_{52}	—	July 12, 2013	Bergisch Gladbach	W. Bickel	ADE	1.3 km	MPC · JPL
731654	2013 NR_{55}	—	January 27, 2011	Mount Lemmon	Mount Lemmon Survey	·	1.4 km	MPC · JPL
731655	2013 NE_{60}	—	July 14, 2013	Haleakala	Pan-STARRS 1	·	2.1 km	MPC · JPL
731656	2013 NP_{62}	—	July 14, 2013	Haleakala	Pan-STARRS 1	V	480 m	MPC · JPL
731657	2013 NG_{63}	—	July 13, 2013	Mount Lemmon	Mount Lemmon Survey	·	1.6 km	MPC · JPL
731658	2013 NQ_{66}	—	April 18, 2012	Mount Lemmon	Mount Lemmon Survey	·	2.1 km	MPC · JPL
731659	2013 NB_{72}	—	July 14, 2013	Haleakala	Pan-STARRS 1	·	1.1 km	MPC · JPL
731660	2013 OU	—	July 16, 2013	Haleakala	Pan-STARRS 1	·	1.7 km	MPC · JPL
731661	2013 OG_{7}	—	November 20, 2003	Palomar	NEAT	·	4.5 km	MPC · JPL
731662	2013 OX_{9}	—	September 16, 2009	Catalina	CSS	·	1.5 km	MPC · JPL
731663	2013 OZ_{10}	—	September 21, 2008	Mount Lemmon	Mount Lemmon Survey	LUT	4.2 km	MPC · JPL
731664	2013 OY_{11}	—	November 25, 2005	Kitt Peak	Spacewatch	·	1.7 km	MPC · JPL
731665	2013 OC_{12}	—	August 1, 2008	La Sagra	OAM	BRA	1.2 km	MPC · JPL
731666	2013 OL_{12}	—	November 18, 2003	Kitt Peak	Spacewatch	·	2.5 km	MPC · JPL
731667	2013 PH_{5}	—	February 5, 2011	Haleakala	Pan-STARRS 1	·	1.6 km	MPC · JPL
731668	2013 PJ_{5}	—	February 5, 2011	Haleakala	Pan-STARRS 1	·	1.8 km	MPC · JPL
731669	2013 PA_{6}	—	November 8, 2009	Catalina	CSS	·	1.4 km	MPC · JPL
731670	2013 PT_{12}	—	July 16, 2013	Haleakala	Pan-STARRS 1	·	1.3 km	MPC · JPL
731671	2013 PG_{14}	—	March 28, 2009	Kitt Peak	Spacewatch	·	600 m	MPC · JPL
731672	2013 PA_{20}	—	February 8, 2008	Mount Lemmon	Mount Lemmon Survey	·	1.4 km	MPC · JPL
731673	2013 PE_{22}	—	August 8, 2013	Haleakala	Pan-STARRS 1	·	880 m	MPC · JPL
731674	2013 PS_{22}	—	January 6, 2010	Mount Lemmon	Mount Lemmon Survey	·	2.7 km	MPC · JPL
731675	2013 PT_{22}	—	August 8, 2013	Haleakala	Pan-STARRS 1	·	2.5 km	MPC · JPL
731676	2013 PH_{23}	—	August 8, 2013	Haleakala	Pan-STARRS 1	·	1.2 km	MPC · JPL
731677	2013 PL_{25}	—	August 9, 2013	Haleakala	Pan-STARRS 1	·	810 m	MPC · JPL
731678 Philippschäfer	2013 PN_{25}	Philippschäfer	August 10, 2013	SM Montmagastrell	Bosch, J. M.	EOS	1.7 km	MPC · JPL
731679	2013 PK_{28}	—	April 2, 2011	Mount Lemmon	Mount Lemmon Survey	·	2.7 km	MPC · JPL
731680	2013 PS_{28}	—	May 27, 2008	Kitt Peak	Spacewatch	·	1.1 km	MPC · JPL
731681	2013 PQ_{29}	—	September 24, 2008	Mount Lemmon	Mount Lemmon Survey	VER	1.9 km	MPC · JPL
731682	2013 PW_{30}	—	January 16, 2005	Mauna Kea	Veillet, C.	·	1.8 km	MPC · JPL
731683	2013 PX_{34}	—	August 9, 2013	Kitt Peak	Spacewatch	·	530 m	MPC · JPL
731684	2013 PA_{36}	—	August 9, 2013	Haleakala	Pan-STARRS 1	NEM	1.8 km	MPC · JPL
731685	2013 PJ_{37}	—	September 25, 2008	Kitt Peak	Spacewatch	·	2.1 km	MPC · JPL
731686	2013 PF_{42}	—	May 4, 2008	Kitt Peak	Spacewatch	·	1.4 km	MPC · JPL
731687	2013 PD_{45}	—	August 8, 2013	Haleakala	Pan-STARRS 1	·	2.5 km	MPC · JPL
731688	2013 PD_{46}	—	February 10, 2011	Mount Lemmon	Mount Lemmon Survey	·	2.2 km	MPC · JPL
731689	2013 PK_{46}	—	July 15, 2013	Haleakala	Pan-STARRS 1	·	1.4 km	MPC · JPL
731690	2013 PN_{46}	—	July 15, 2013	Haleakala	Pan-STARRS 1	·	2.2 km	MPC · JPL
731691	2013 PR_{46}	—	August 8, 2013	Haleakala	Pan-STARRS 1	·	2.8 km	MPC · JPL
731692	2013 PK_{48}	—	January 15, 2005	Kitt Peak	Spacewatch	·	610 m	MPC · JPL
731693	2013 PH_{51}	—	August 18, 2002	Palomar	NEAT	V	540 m	MPC · JPL
731694	2013 PY_{51}	—	August 13, 2013	Kitt Peak	Spacewatch	EOS	1.7 km	MPC · JPL
731695	2013 PA_{52}	—	October 8, 2008	Mount Lemmon	Mount Lemmon Survey	·	2.2 km	MPC · JPL
731696	2013 PV_{53}	—	February 27, 2011	Haleakala	Armstrong, J. D.	·	2.2 km	MPC · JPL
731697	2013 PJ_{55}	—	August 9, 2013	Haleakala	Pan-STARRS 1	·	2.3 km	MPC · JPL
731698	2013 PN_{61}	—	July 16, 2013	Haleakala	Pan-STARRS 1	·	2.3 km	MPC · JPL
731699	2013 PV_{62}	—	September 26, 2003	Apache Point	SDSS Collaboration	·	1.8 km	MPC · JPL
731700	2013 PF_{63}	—	February 5, 2011	Haleakala	Pan-STARRS 1	·	1.4 km	MPC · JPL

== 731701–731800 ==
back to top

Designation			Discovery			Properties		Ref
Permanent	Provisional	Named after	Date	Site	Discoverer(s)	Category	Diam.	Ref
731701	2013 PS_{65}	—	August 15, 2013	Haleakala	Pan-STARRS 1	·	2.1 km	MPC · JPL
731702	2013 PS_{68}	—	March 15, 2012	Mount Lemmon	Mount Lemmon Survey	·	820 m	MPC · JPL
731703	2013 PZ_{68}	—	November 4, 2004	Palomar	NEAT	·	3.5 km	MPC · JPL
731704	2013 PQ_{69}	—	August 20, 2002	Palomar	NEAT	·	3.9 km	MPC · JPL
731705	2013 PU_{72}	—	August 14, 2006	Siding Spring	SSS	ULA	4.0 km	MPC · JPL
731706	2013 PM_{73}	—	July 5, 2008	La Sagra	OAM	·	2.6 km	MPC · JPL
731707	2013 PQ_{74}	—	August 10, 2013	Kitt Peak	Spacewatch	·	1.7 km	MPC · JPL
731708	2013 PM_{77}	—	January 7, 2010	Kitt Peak	Spacewatch	EOS	1.7 km	MPC · JPL
731709	2013 PC_{80}	—	August 8, 2013	Haleakala	Pan-STARRS 1	·	2.1 km	MPC · JPL
731710	2013 PW_{81}	—	August 14, 2013	Haleakala	Pan-STARRS 1	KOR	1.1 km	MPC · JPL
731711	2013 PY_{81}	—	September 24, 2008	Kitt Peak	Spacewatch	·	2.6 km	MPC · JPL
731712	2013 PR_{82}	—	September 23, 2008	Kitt Peak	Spacewatch	·	2.2 km	MPC · JPL
731713	2013 PN_{83}	—	August 8, 2013	Haleakala	Pan-STARRS 1	·	900 m	MPC · JPL
731714	2013 PR_{83}	—	August 3, 2013	Haleakala	Pan-STARRS 1	·	750 m	MPC · JPL
731715	2013 PV_{98}	—	August 4, 2013	Haleakala	Pan-STARRS 1	·	2.1 km	MPC · JPL
731716 Käszlaci	2013 PD_{101}	Käszlaci	August 7, 2013	Piszkés-tető	K. Sárneczky, T. Csörgei	·	1.4 km	MPC · JPL
731717	2013 PC_{111}	—	August 12, 2013	Haleakala	Pan-STARRS 1	·	2.1 km	MPC · JPL
731718	2013 PK_{118}	—	August 15, 2013	Haleakala	Pan-STARRS 1	AGN	820 m	MPC · JPL
731719	2013 PM_{124}	—	August 9, 2013	Haleakala	Pan-STARRS 1	VER	2.1 km	MPC · JPL
731720	2013 QD_{1}	—	October 18, 2003	Apache Point	SDSS Collaboration	EOS	1.5 km	MPC · JPL
731721	2013 QB_{2}	—	August 16, 2013	Elena Remote	Oreshko, A.	·	3.2 km	MPC · JPL
731722	2013 QT_{2}	—	August 9, 2008	La Sagra	OAM	·	2.7 km	MPC · JPL
731723	2013 QT_{3}	—	January 4, 2001	Kitt Peak	Spacewatch	·	2.0 km	MPC · JPL
731724	2013 QB_{4}	—	November 20, 2003	Kitt Peak	Spacewatch	VER	3.1 km	MPC · JPL
731725	2013 QZ_{7}	—	August 26, 2013	Haleakala	Pan-STARRS 1	EOS	1.2 km	MPC · JPL
731726	2013 QD_{9}	—	October 16, 2006	Junk Bond	D. Healy	·	880 m	MPC · JPL
731727	2013 QK_{9}	—	August 8, 2002	Campo Imperatore	CINEOS	·	2.6 km	MPC · JPL
731728	2013 QH_{14}	—	August 8, 2013	Kitt Peak	Spacewatch	·	1.2 km	MPC · JPL
731729	2013 QS_{18}	—	February 2, 2005	Kitt Peak	Spacewatch	ARM	2.8 km	MPC · JPL
731730	2013 QF_{19}	—	September 15, 2004	Kitt Peak	Spacewatch	AST	3.3 km	MPC · JPL
731731	2013 QO_{23}	—	August 9, 2013	Haleakala	Pan-STARRS 1	EOS	1.5 km	MPC · JPL
731732	2013 QP_{23}	—	August 9, 2013	Kitt Peak	Spacewatch	·	2.2 km	MPC · JPL
731733	2013 QL_{24}	—	December 25, 2010	Mount Lemmon	Mount Lemmon Survey	·	750 m	MPC · JPL
731734	2013 QM_{29}	—	February 27, 2012	Haleakala	Pan-STARRS 1	MAS	610 m	MPC · JPL
731735	2013 QL_{30}	—	October 20, 2003	Palomar	NEAT	·	1.8 km	MPC · JPL
731736	2013 QL_{33}	—	August 30, 2013	Haleakala	Pan-STARRS 1	·	550 m	MPC · JPL
731737	2013 QL_{37}	—	August 26, 2013	Haleakala	Pan-STARRS 1	·	1.3 km	MPC · JPL
731738	2013 QO_{38}	—	August 28, 2013	Mount Lemmon	Mount Lemmon Survey	EOS	1.6 km	MPC · JPL
731739	2013 QV_{38}	—	October 23, 2003	Apache Point	SDSS	EOS	1.4 km	MPC · JPL
731740	2013 QJ_{42}	—	September 4, 2008	Kitt Peak	Spacewatch	·	2.0 km	MPC · JPL
731741	2013 QS_{45}	—	August 7, 2013	Kitt Peak	Spacewatch	HNS	740 m	MPC · JPL
731742	2013 QC_{51}	—	August 15, 2013	Haleakala	Pan-STARRS 1	EOS	1.4 km	MPC · JPL
731743	2013 QG_{52}	—	August 30, 2013	Haleakala	Pan-STARRS 1	·	2.1 km	MPC · JPL
731744	2013 QN_{52}	—	August 15, 2013	Haleakala	Pan-STARRS 1	EOS	1.4 km	MPC · JPL
731745	2013 QH_{57}	—	October 21, 2003	Kitt Peak	Spacewatch	·	2.8 km	MPC · JPL
731746	2013 QS_{57}	—	February 13, 2010	Mount Lemmon	Mount Lemmon Survey	·	2.1 km	MPC · JPL
731747	2013 QT_{65}	—	August 27, 2013	Haleakala	Pan-STARRS 1	PHO	1.1 km	MPC · JPL
731748	2013 QE_{66}	—	August 12, 2013	Kitt Peak	Spacewatch	·	1.8 km	MPC · JPL
731749	2013 QN_{70}	—	August 30, 2013	Piszkéstető	K. Sárneczky	·	3.6 km	MPC · JPL
731750	2013 QJ_{71}	—	April 2, 2010	WISE	WISE	·	3.6 km	MPC · JPL
731751	2013 QH_{73}	—	August 4, 2005	Palomar	NEAT	H	570 m	MPC · JPL
731752	2013 QU_{78}	—	April 25, 2007	Mount Lemmon	Mount Lemmon Survey	·	2.4 km	MPC · JPL
731753	2013 QE_{80}	—	January 26, 2003	Haleakala	NEAT	·	1.5 km	MPC · JPL
731754	2013 QB_{81}	—	July 8, 2007	Lulin	LUSS	HYG	3.8 km	MPC · JPL
731755	2013 QM_{82}	—	August 31, 2013	Haleakala	Pan-STARRS 1	KOR	1.1 km	MPC · JPL
731756	2013 QS_{82}	—	September 27, 2005	Palomar	NEAT	·	1.0 km	MPC · JPL
731757	2013 QR_{85}	—	August 9, 2013	Haleakala	Pan-STARRS 1	·	1.4 km	MPC · JPL
731758	2013 QC_{86}	—	September 22, 2008	Kitt Peak	Spacewatch	·	2.2 km	MPC · JPL
731759	2013 QF_{87}	—	May 1, 2012	Mount Lemmon	Mount Lemmon Survey	HOF	2.1 km	MPC · JPL
731760	2013 QH_{87}	—	October 11, 2009	Mount Lemmon	Mount Lemmon Survey	·	1.6 km	MPC · JPL
731761	2013 QY_{88}	—	August 9, 2013	Haleakala	Pan-STARRS 1	·	1.9 km	MPC · JPL
731762	2013 QZ_{89}	—	January 12, 2002	Kitt Peak	Spacewatch	GEF	1.4 km	MPC · JPL
731763	2013 QB_{90}	—	February 25, 2011	Mount Lemmon	Mount Lemmon Survey	KOR	1.1 km	MPC · JPL
731764	2013 QC_{91}	—	August 8, 2013	Kitt Peak	Spacewatch	·	1.7 km	MPC · JPL
731765	2013 QW_{91}	—	April 13, 2012	Haleakala	Pan-STARRS 1	·	1.8 km	MPC · JPL
731766	2013 QE_{93}	—	January 16, 2005	Mauna Kea	Veillet, C.	EOS	1.7 km	MPC · JPL
731767	2013 QB_{94}	—	January 9, 2006	Kitt Peak	Spacewatch	·	2.3 km	MPC · JPL
731768	2013 QD_{99}	—	January 7, 2016	Haleakala	Pan-STARRS 1	·	2.7 km	MPC · JPL
731769	2013 RR	—	August 15, 1996	Haleakala-NEAT/GEO	NEAT	·	2.2 km	MPC · JPL
731770	2013 RA_{15}	—	August 24, 2008	Kitt Peak	Spacewatch	·	2.8 km	MPC · JPL
731771	2013 RZ_{18}	—	December 5, 2010	Kitt Peak	Spacewatch	·	1.4 km	MPC · JPL
731772	2013 RG_{19}	—	January 17, 2005	Kitt Peak	Spacewatch	·	3.8 km	MPC · JPL
731773	2013 RL_{19}	—	September 13, 2002	Palomar	NEAT	ARM	4.8 km	MPC · JPL
731774	2013 RQ_{19}	—	December 27, 2003	Kitt Peak	Spacewatch	·	4.0 km	MPC · JPL
731775	2013 RE_{23}	—	October 22, 2009	Mount Lemmon	Mount Lemmon Survey	·	1.4 km	MPC · JPL
731776	2013 RO_{23}	—	August 15, 2013	Haleakala	Pan-STARRS 1	·	760 m	MPC · JPL
731777	2013 RF_{24}	—	April 7, 2005	Kitt Peak	Spacewatch	MAS	790 m	MPC · JPL
731778	2013 RJ_{27}	—	December 20, 2001	Apache Point	SDSS Collaboration	·	1.6 km	MPC · JPL
731779	2013 RA_{29}	—	September 4, 2013	Mount Lemmon	Mount Lemmon Survey	·	2.6 km	MPC · JPL
731780	2013 RB_{33}	—	September 3, 2013	ASC-Kislovodsk	Nevski, V.	·	1.4 km	MPC · JPL
731781	2013 RH_{33}	—	October 22, 2006	Kitt Peak	Spacewatch	·	1.2 km	MPC · JPL
731782	2013 RT_{33}	—	January 16, 2005	Mauna Kea	Veillet, C.	·	1.6 km	MPC · JPL
731783	2013 RX_{41}	—	April 5, 2010	WISE	WISE	·	3.0 km	MPC · JPL
731784	2013 RU_{45}	—	March 3, 2005	Kitt Peak	Spacewatch	·	3.3 km	MPC · JPL
731785	2013 RP_{48}	—	April 19, 2012	Mount Lemmon	Mount Lemmon Survey	·	950 m	MPC · JPL
731786	2013 RD_{50}	—	February 12, 2000	Apache Point	SDSS	·	1.8 km	MPC · JPL
731787	2013 RZ_{52}	—	February 12, 2004	Kitt Peak	Spacewatch	·	4.0 km	MPC · JPL
731788	2013 RB_{53}	—	September 12, 2013	Cerro Tololo-LCO A	Lister, T.	·	2.2 km	MPC · JPL
731789	2013 RN_{53}	—	February 16, 2010	Kitt Peak	Spacewatch	3:2	6.0 km	MPC · JPL
731790	2013 RW_{54}	—	October 9, 2008	Mount Lemmon	Mount Lemmon Survey	·	2.1 km	MPC · JPL
731791	2013 RC_{56}	—	January 16, 2005	Mauna Kea	Veillet, C.	·	2.5 km	MPC · JPL
731792	2013 RC_{58}	—	February 17, 2010	Mount Lemmon	Mount Lemmon Survey	EMA	2.5 km	MPC · JPL
731793	2013 RP_{58}	—	May 3, 2006	Mount Lemmon	Mount Lemmon Survey	·	2.6 km	MPC · JPL
731794	2013 RM_{59}	—	September 10, 2013	Haleakala	Pan-STARRS 1	·	930 m	MPC · JPL
731795	2013 RR_{59}	—	January 13, 2008	Kitt Peak	Spacewatch	·	540 m	MPC · JPL
731796	2013 RJ_{63}	—	February 17, 2004	Kitt Peak	Spacewatch	MAS	710 m	MPC · JPL
731797	2013 RW_{65}	—	September 12, 2013	Mount Lemmon	Mount Lemmon Survey	·	1.1 km	MPC · JPL
731798	2013 RA_{67}	—	September 3, 2013	Haleakala	Pan-STARRS 1	·	1.2 km	MPC · JPL
731799	2013 RR_{74}	—	October 4, 2003	Kitt Peak	Spacewatch	·	1.8 km	MPC · JPL
731800	2013 RS_{75}	—	August 12, 2013	Haleakala	Pan-STARRS 1	·	1.4 km	MPC · JPL

== 731801–731900 ==
back to top

Designation			Discovery			Properties		Ref
Permanent	Provisional	Named after	Date	Site	Discoverer(s)	Category	Diam.	Ref
731801	2013 RM_{77}	—	August 30, 2002	Kitt Peak	Spacewatch	·	920 m	MPC · JPL
731802	2013 RA_{78}	—	February 12, 2011	Mount Lemmon	Mount Lemmon Survey	·	1.3 km	MPC · JPL
731803	2013 RX_{78}	—	October 9, 2008	Kitt Peak	Spacewatch	·	2.1 km	MPC · JPL
731804	2013 RD_{79}	—	March 11, 2005	Mount Lemmon	Mount Lemmon Survey	·	2.2 km	MPC · JPL
731805	2013 RH_{81}	—	September 1, 2013	Mount Lemmon	Mount Lemmon Survey	·	1.8 km	MPC · JPL
731806	2013 RB_{83}	—	September 11, 2007	Mount Lemmon	Mount Lemmon Survey	URS	2.4 km	MPC · JPL
731807	2013 RD_{84}	—	September 5, 2013	Kitt Peak	Spacewatch	·	2.7 km	MPC · JPL
731808	2013 RB_{87}	—	September 13, 2013	Kitt Peak	Spacewatch	AGN	950 m	MPC · JPL
731809	2013 RO_{88}	—	May 5, 2010	WISE	WISE	·	2.5 km	MPC · JPL
731810	2013 RX_{88}	—	September 14, 2013	Kitt Peak	Spacewatch	HYG	2.2 km	MPC · JPL
731811	2013 RJ_{89}	—	September 14, 2013	Kitt Peak	Spacewatch	·	2.4 km	MPC · JPL
731812	2013 RO_{91}	—	September 1, 2013	Mount Lemmon	Mount Lemmon Survey	·	1.6 km	MPC · JPL
731813	2013 RH_{92}	—	December 31, 2008	Mount Lemmon	Mount Lemmon Survey	·	3.0 km	MPC · JPL
731814	2013 RA_{95}	—	January 29, 2010	WISE	WISE	·	1.2 km	MPC · JPL
731815 Stefanberg	2013 RN_{95}	Stefanberg	September 1, 2013	SATINO Remote	J. Jahn	·	2.7 km	MPC · JPL
731816	2013 RQ_{101}	—	September 6, 2013	Kitt Peak	Spacewatch	·	2.4 km	MPC · JPL
731817	2013 RF_{102}	—	September 4, 2013	Mount Lemmon	Mount Lemmon Survey	·	2.5 km	MPC · JPL
731818	2013 RT_{103}	—	April 5, 2011	Mount Lemmon	Mount Lemmon Survey	URS	2.6 km	MPC · JPL
731819	2013 RU_{105}	—	September 12, 2013	Kitt Peak	Spacewatch	·	2.0 km	MPC · JPL
731820	2013 RL_{107}	—	September 15, 2013	Mount Lemmon	Mount Lemmon Survey	·	2.6 km	MPC · JPL
731821	2013 RH_{129}	—	September 13, 2013	Kitt Peak	Spacewatch	·	2.6 km	MPC · JPL
731822	2013 RE_{131}	—	September 9, 2013	Haleakala	Pan-STARRS 1	·	720 m	MPC · JPL
731823	2013 RG_{131}	—	September 1, 2013	Mount Lemmon	Mount Lemmon Survey	EOS	1.5 km	MPC · JPL
731824	2013 RR_{131}	—	September 3, 2013	Calar Alto	F. Hormuth	L5	7.9 km	MPC · JPL
731825	2013 RS_{131}	—	September 1, 2013	Mount Lemmon	Mount Lemmon Survey	L5	6.5 km	MPC · JPL
731826	2013 RC_{136}	—	September 10, 2013	Haleakala	Pan-STARRS 1	·	800 m	MPC · JPL
731827	2013 RD_{142}	—	September 6, 2013	Bergisch Gladbach	W. Bickel	THB	2.1 km	MPC · JPL
731828	2013 RW_{148}	—	September 1, 2013	Haleakala	Pan-STARRS 1	L5	6.3 km	MPC · JPL
731829	2013 RU_{160}	—	September 13, 2013	Mount Lemmon	Mount Lemmon Survey	·	1.8 km	MPC · JPL
731830	2013 RB_{163}	—	September 9, 2013	Haleakala	Pan-STARRS 1	·	1.0 km	MPC · JPL
731831	2013 RO_{175}	—	September 14, 2013	Mount Lemmon	Mount Lemmon Survey	·	2.1 km	MPC · JPL
731832	2013 SQ_{2}	—	September 2, 2013	Mount Lemmon	Mount Lemmon Survey	THM	1.9 km	MPC · JPL
731833	2013 SW_{2}	—	June 3, 2010	WISE	WISE	·	3.6 km	MPC · JPL
731834	2013 SY_{2}	—	September 16, 2013	Mount Lemmon	Mount Lemmon Survey	PHO	750 m	MPC · JPL
731835	2013 SK_{4}	—	March 31, 2010	WISE	WISE	L5	10 km	MPC · JPL
731836	2013 SM_{14}	—	April 15, 2012	Haleakala	Pan-STARRS 1	·	2.0 km	MPC · JPL
731837	2013 SF_{18}	—	September 9, 2013	Haleakala	Pan-STARRS 1	·	3.0 km	MPC · JPL
731838	2013 SP_{21}	—	October 27, 2008	Kitt Peak	Spacewatch	·	1.9 km	MPC · JPL
731839	2013 SR_{23}	—	October 22, 2003	Apache Point	SDSS Collaboration	·	1.7 km	MPC · JPL
731840	2013 SD_{26}	—	February 17, 2010	Mount Lemmon	Mount Lemmon Survey	·	3.5 km	MPC · JPL
731841	2013 SE_{26}	—	September 20, 2003	Palomar	NEAT	NAE	2.7 km	MPC · JPL
731842	2013 SA_{29}	—	September 26, 2013	Catalina	CSS	·	2.8 km	MPC · JPL
731843	2013 SJ_{29}	—	February 17, 2010	Kitt Peak	Spacewatch	·	2.9 km	MPC · JPL
731844	2013 SF_{32}	—	August 15, 2002	Palomar	NEAT	·	2.1 km	MPC · JPL
731845	2013 SQ_{32}	—	September 1, 2013	Mount Lemmon	Mount Lemmon Survey	KOR	1.1 km	MPC · JPL
731846	2013 SZ_{33}	—	September 6, 2013	Mount Lemmon	Mount Lemmon Survey	EOS	1.6 km	MPC · JPL
731847	2013 SB_{43}	—	September 5, 2013	Kitt Peak	Spacewatch	·	1.7 km	MPC · JPL
731848	2013 SO_{43}	—	May 24, 2010	WISE	WISE	·	3.4 km	MPC · JPL
731849	2013 SL_{46}	—	February 2, 2005	Kitt Peak	Spacewatch	(1298)	2.7 km	MPC · JPL
731850	2013 SY_{47}	—	September 28, 2013	Kitt Peak	Spacewatch	·	2.3 km	MPC · JPL
731851	2013 SN_{48}	—	October 7, 2005	Mauna Kea	A. Boattini	HOF	2.6 km	MPC · JPL
731852	2013 SW_{50}	—	October 10, 2002	Apache Point	SDSS Collaboration	MAS	700 m	MPC · JPL
731853	2013 SM_{53}	—	September 29, 2013	Mount Lemmon	Mount Lemmon Survey	·	2.8 km	MPC · JPL
731854	2013 SZ_{54}	—	December 18, 2009	Kitt Peak	Spacewatch	EOS	1.7 km	MPC · JPL
731855	2013 SU_{61}	—	October 25, 2008	La Cañada	Lacruz, J.	HYG	3.2 km	MPC · JPL
731856	2013 SK_{67}	—	September 29, 2008	Mount Lemmon	Mount Lemmon Survey	EOS	1.6 km	MPC · JPL
731857	2013 SC_{68}	—	September 24, 2013	Mount Lemmon	Mount Lemmon Survey	·	550 m	MPC · JPL
731858	2013 SB_{70}	—	March 29, 2011	Mount Lemmon	Mount Lemmon Survey	·	1.5 km	MPC · JPL
731859	2013 SV_{70}	—	March 1, 2005	Kitt Peak	Spacewatch	EOS	4.2 km	MPC · JPL
731860	2013 SD_{71}	—	September 27, 2006	Mount Lemmon	Mount Lemmon Survey	·	1.1 km	MPC · JPL
731861	2013 SH_{76}	—	September 14, 2013	Haleakala	Pan-STARRS 1	·	2.1 km	MPC · JPL
731862	2013 SJ_{76}	—	April 14, 2005	Kitt Peak	Spacewatch	·	1.1 km	MPC · JPL
731863	2013 SP_{77}	—	February 13, 2008	Kitt Peak	Spacewatch	·	610 m	MPC · JPL
731864	2013 ST_{78}	—	August 31, 2000	Socorro	LINEAR	·	650 m	MPC · JPL
731865	2013 SW_{78}	—	July 18, 2001	Palomar	NEAT	·	4.4 km	MPC · JPL
731866	2013 SJ_{81}	—	April 27, 2010	WISE	WISE	·	3.1 km	MPC · JPL
731867	2013 SX_{82}	—	November 14, 2002	Palomar	NEAT	·	1.2 km	MPC · JPL
731868	2013 SR_{84}	—	September 3, 2013	Catalina	CSS	·	1.3 km	MPC · JPL
731869	2013 SP_{85}	—	October 3, 2013	Haleakala	Pan-STARRS 1	·	1.0 km	MPC · JPL
731870	2013 SZ_{85}	—	October 1, 2013	Palomar	Palomar Transient Factory	L5	8.9 km	MPC · JPL
731871	2013 SE_{88}	—	October 23, 2003	Kitt Peak	Spacewatch	·	570 m	MPC · JPL
731872	2013 SO_{89}	—	September 9, 2007	Kitt Peak	Spacewatch	·	3.0 km	MPC · JPL
731873	2013 SZ_{92}	—	September 2, 2013	Mount Lemmon	Mount Lemmon Survey	·	2.2 km	MPC · JPL
731874	2013 SP_{93}	—	November 8, 2009	Kitt Peak	Spacewatch	·	1.2 km	MPC · JPL
731875	2013 SH_{99}	—	August 14, 2012	Haleakala	Pan-STARRS 1	L5	7.2 km	MPC · JPL
731876	2013 SO_{101}	—	January 19, 2008	Mount Lemmon	Mount Lemmon Survey	·	580 m	MPC · JPL
731877	2013 SF_{102}	—	October 16, 2001	Kitt Peak	Spacewatch	·	2.8 km	MPC · JPL
731878	2013 SL_{107}	—	September 24, 2013	Kitt Peak	Spacewatch	PHO	670 m	MPC · JPL
731879	2013 TT	—	October 1, 2013	Elena Remote	Oreshko, A.	·	2.6 km	MPC · JPL
731880	2013 TY_{1}	—	February 11, 2004	Palomar	NEAT	VER	3.4 km	MPC · JPL
731881	2013 TB_{3}	—	September 21, 2001	Anderson Mesa	LONEOS	·	6.1 km	MPC · JPL
731882	2013 TD_{3}	—	August 27, 2003	Palomar	NEAT	·	5.1 km	MPC · JPL
731883	2013 TY_{3}	—	December 22, 2003	Kitt Peak	Spacewatch	·	4.4 km	MPC · JPL
731884	2013 TC_{8}	—	October 10, 2002	Palomar	NEAT	·	3.1 km	MPC · JPL
731885	2013 TO_{10}	—	October 14, 2001	Socorro	LINEAR	L5	10 km	MPC · JPL
731886	2013 TC_{15}	—	January 16, 2005	Mauna Kea	Veillet, C.	·	2.3 km	MPC · JPL
731887	2013 TA_{16}	—	April 25, 2010	WISE	WISE	·	2.4 km	MPC · JPL
731888	2013 TA_{18}	—	August 20, 2006	Palomar	NEAT	·	570 m	MPC · JPL
731889	2013 TZ_{23}	—	October 1, 2013	Mount Lemmon	Mount Lemmon Survey	·	2.5 km	MPC · JPL
731890	2013 TY_{24}	—	September 23, 2008	Mount Lemmon	Mount Lemmon Survey	·	1.8 km	MPC · JPL
731891	2013 TD_{25}	—	October 3, 2002	Socorro	LINEAR	·	1.0 km	MPC · JPL
731892	2013 TV_{28}	—	October 1, 2013	Palomar	Palomar Transient Factory	·	2.6 km	MPC · JPL
731893	2013 TM_{30}	—	October 1, 2013	Kitt Peak	Spacewatch	NYS	1.0 km	MPC · JPL
731894	2013 TT_{31}	—	February 12, 2011	Mount Lemmon	Mount Lemmon Survey	·	960 m	MPC · JPL
731895	2013 TS_{33}	—	October 3, 2013	Mount Lemmon	Mount Lemmon Survey	·	1.1 km	MPC · JPL
731896	2013 TT_{33}	—	July 20, 2013	Haleakala	Pan-STARRS 1	·	2.3 km	MPC · JPL
731897	2013 TR_{35}	—	April 2, 2005	Kitt Peak	Spacewatch	·	2.8 km	MPC · JPL
731898	2013 TO_{38}	—	February 16, 2010	Mount Lemmon	Mount Lemmon Survey	·	2.4 km	MPC · JPL
731899	2013 TF_{39}	—	June 1, 2010	WISE	WISE	·	4.0 km	MPC · JPL
731900	2013 TC_{40}	—	January 29, 2007	Kitt Peak	Spacewatch	·	940 m	MPC · JPL

== 731901–732000 ==
back to top

Designation			Discovery			Properties		Ref
Permanent	Provisional	Named after	Date	Site	Discoverer(s)	Category	Diam.	Ref
731901	2013 TR_{43}	—	September 15, 2013	Mount Lemmon	Mount Lemmon Survey	·	1.8 km	MPC · JPL
731902	2013 TG_{44}	—	December 15, 2006	Kitt Peak	Spacewatch	MAS	540 m	MPC · JPL
731903	2013 TE_{47}	—	October 23, 2009	Mount Lemmon	Mount Lemmon Survey	·	1.3 km	MPC · JPL
731904	2013 TM_{49}	—	October 3, 2013	Mount Lemmon	Mount Lemmon Survey	·	600 m	MPC · JPL
731905	2013 TQ_{50}	—	October 2, 2013	Kitt Peak	Spacewatch	·	1.3 km	MPC · JPL
731906	2013 TX_{57}	—	October 4, 2013	Mount Lemmon	Mount Lemmon Survey	·	510 m	MPC · JPL
731907	2013 TH_{60}	—	October 4, 2013	Mount Lemmon	Mount Lemmon Survey	VER	2.2 km	MPC · JPL
731908	2013 TO_{60}	—	January 16, 2005	Kitt Peak	Spacewatch	L5	8.9 km	MPC · JPL
731909	2013 TU_{65}	—	November 6, 2008	Mount Lemmon	Mount Lemmon Survey	EOS	1.6 km	MPC · JPL
731910	2013 TC_{66}	—	March 3, 2000	Apache Point	SDSS	EOS	1.6 km	MPC · JPL
731911	2013 TK_{66}	—	October 4, 2013	Mount Lemmon	Mount Lemmon Survey	·	1.1 km	MPC · JPL
731912	2013 TK_{67}	—	October 5, 2013	Haleakala	Pan-STARRS 1	EOS	1.4 km	MPC · JPL
731913	2013 TN_{70}	—	July 21, 2012	Bergisch Gladbach	W. Bickel	·	2.5 km	MPC · JPL
731914	2013 TF_{72}	—	September 26, 2002	Palomar	NEAT	MAS	590 m	MPC · JPL
731915	2013 TS_{73}	—	May 1, 2005	Palomar	NEAT	·	5.9 km	MPC · JPL
731916	2013 TR_{74}	—	March 5, 2008	Mount Lemmon	Mount Lemmon Survey	L5	10 km	MPC · JPL
731917	2013 TO_{75}	—	September 14, 2013	Mount Lemmon	Mount Lemmon Survey	·	2.2 km	MPC · JPL
731918	2013 TV_{76}	—	April 13, 2010	WISE	WISE	·	3.8 km	MPC · JPL
731919	2013 TG_{77}	—	October 3, 2002	Socorro	LINEAR	·	930 m	MPC · JPL
731920	2013 TR_{78}	—	May 11, 2010	WISE	WISE	·	3.3 km	MPC · JPL
731921	2013 TZ_{79}	—	September 3, 2013	Kitt Peak	Spacewatch	L5	10 km	MPC · JPL
731922	2013 TY_{84}	—	October 12, 1996	Kitt Peak	Spacewatch	·	3.1 km	MPC · JPL
731923	2013 TW_{88}	—	December 3, 2008	Kitt Peak	Spacewatch	·	2.2 km	MPC · JPL
731924	2013 TC_{90}	—	February 13, 2004	Kitt Peak	Spacewatch	HYG	2.8 km	MPC · JPL
731925	2013 TQ_{90}	—	September 3, 2002	Palomar	NEAT	·	1.2 km	MPC · JPL
731926	2013 TO_{98}	—	December 19, 2004	Mount Lemmon	Mount Lemmon Survey	KOR	1.6 km	MPC · JPL
731927	2013 TX_{99}	—	June 4, 2010	WISE	WISE	·	2.7 km	MPC · JPL
731928	2013 TX_{103}	—	September 28, 1998	Kitt Peak	Spacewatch	NYS	980 m	MPC · JPL
731929	2013 TK_{104}	—	July 29, 2008	Mount Lemmon	Mount Lemmon Survey	·	1.8 km	MPC · JPL
731930	2013 TX_{104}	—	May 29, 2009	Mount Lemmon	Mount Lemmon Survey	·	560 m	MPC · JPL
731931	2013 TC_{107}	—	October 3, 2013	Kitt Peak	Spacewatch	(11882)	1.2 km	MPC · JPL
731932	2013 TG_{108}	—	September 7, 1996	Kitt Peak	Spacewatch	THM	2.2 km	MPC · JPL
731933	2013 TX_{108}	—	September 3, 2013	Calar Alto	F. Hormuth	·	880 m	MPC · JPL
731934	2013 TN_{111}	—	February 12, 2004	Palomar	NEAT	·	3.9 km	MPC · JPL
731935	2013 TM_{114}	—	November 7, 2002	Kitt Peak	Spacewatch	·	3.4 km	MPC · JPL
731936	2013 TM_{115}	—	June 18, 2012	Mount Lemmon	Mount Lemmon Survey	·	2.4 km	MPC · JPL
731937	2013 TX_{118}	—	October 4, 2013	Mount Lemmon	Mount Lemmon Survey	·	1.1 km	MPC · JPL
731938	2013 TK_{119}	—	October 4, 2013	Mount Lemmon	Mount Lemmon Survey	L5	6.6 km	MPC · JPL
731939	2013 TU_{123}	—	October 9, 2008	Mount Lemmon	Mount Lemmon Survey	·	3.3 km	MPC · JPL
731940	2013 TG_{127}	—	September 8, 2000	Kitt Peak	Spacewatch	·	4.9 km	MPC · JPL
731941	2013 TO_{127}	—	August 3, 2000	Kitt Peak	Spacewatch	L5	9.6 km	MPC · JPL
731942	2013 TW_{129}	—	May 20, 2012	Mount Lemmon	Mount Lemmon Survey	·	2.2 km	MPC · JPL
731943	2013 TN_{137}	—	April 25, 2007	Mount Lemmon	Mount Lemmon Survey	L5	10 km	MPC · JPL
731944	2013 TJ_{139}	—	November 14, 2002	Palomar	NEAT	·	4.1 km	MPC · JPL
731945	2013 TM_{140}	—	September 18, 2006	Kitt Peak	Spacewatch	·	610 m	MPC · JPL
731946	2013 TW_{140}	—	September 15, 2013	Haleakala	Pan-STARRS 1	·	2.1 km	MPC · JPL
731947	2013 TA_{141}	—	April 12, 2004	Kitt Peak	Spacewatch	·	1.4 km	MPC · JPL
731948	2013 TN_{142}	—	December 11, 2010	Mount Lemmon	Mount Lemmon Survey	MAS	650 m	MPC · JPL
731949	2013 TW_{143}	—	October 2, 2013	Palomar	Palomar Transient Factory	·	3.2 km	MPC · JPL
731950	2013 TA_{146}	—	October 1, 2003	Kitt Peak	Spacewatch	·	770 m	MPC · JPL
731951	2013 TZ_{146}	—	January 8, 2011	Mount Lemmon	Mount Lemmon Survey	·	2.1 km	MPC · JPL
731952	2013 TR_{147}	—	July 21, 2006	Mount Lemmon	Mount Lemmon Survey	·	800 m	MPC · JPL
731953	2013 TM_{149}	—	November 25, 2010	Mount Lemmon	Mount Lemmon Survey	·	810 m	MPC · JPL
731954	2013 TZ_{152}	—	October 30, 2002	Kitt Peak	Spacewatch	·	2.0 km	MPC · JPL
731955	2013 TK_{155}	—	March 30, 2010	WISE	WISE	·	1.4 km	MPC · JPL
731956	2013 TM_{155}	—	August 31, 2013	Haleakala	Pan-STARRS 1	KOR	1.1 km	MPC · JPL
731957	2013 TN_{155}	—	August 12, 2013	Haleakala	Pan-STARRS 1	·	2.3 km	MPC · JPL
731958	2013 TK_{159}	—	October 5, 2013	Haleakala	Pan-STARRS 1	·	2.4 km	MPC · JPL
731959	2013 TL_{160}	—	August 10, 2007	Kitt Peak	Spacewatch	·	1.9 km	MPC · JPL
731960	2013 TD_{161}	—	October 5, 2013	Kitt Peak	Spacewatch	·	2.2 km	MPC · JPL
731961	2013 TQ_{162}	—	September 13, 2007	Mount Lemmon	Mount Lemmon Survey	THM	2.2 km	MPC · JPL
731962	2013 TS_{162}	—	October 3, 2013	Haleakala	Pan-STARRS 1	·	2.5 km	MPC · JPL
731963	2013 TT_{162}	—	October 3, 2013	Haleakala	Pan-STARRS 1	·	2.8 km	MPC · JPL
731964	2013 TX_{164}	—	October 2, 2013	Haleakala	Pan-STARRS 1	·	1.5 km	MPC · JPL
731965	2013 TY_{164}	—	September 28, 2003	Kitt Peak	Spacewatch	·	520 m	MPC · JPL
731966	2013 TD_{166}	—	September 4, 2013	Mount Lemmon	Mount Lemmon Survey	·	2.7 km	MPC · JPL
731967	2013 TG_{168}	—	September 28, 2013	Mount Lemmon	Mount Lemmon Survey	·	1.8 km	MPC · JPL
731968	2013 TX_{168}	—	April 9, 2010	Mount Lemmon	Mount Lemmon Survey	·	3.6 km	MPC · JPL
731969	2013 TA_{169}	—	October 5, 2013	Haleakala	Pan-STARRS 1	·	1.6 km	MPC · JPL
731970	2013 TH_{171}	—	November 17, 2009	Kitt Peak	Spacewatch	·	1.1 km	MPC · JPL
731971	2013 TQ_{171}	—	May 30, 2010	WISE	WISE	·	4.2 km	MPC · JPL
731972	2013 TV_{171}	—	June 23, 2010	WISE	WISE	·	3.6 km	MPC · JPL
731973	2013 TY_{172}	—	June 16, 2010	WISE	WISE	·	3.1 km	MPC · JPL
731974	2013 TW_{173}	—	October 9, 2013	Mount Lemmon	Mount Lemmon Survey	·	1.2 km	MPC · JPL
731975	2013 TB_{175}	—	April 9, 2006	Mount Lemmon	Mount Lemmon Survey	·	2.3 km	MPC · JPL
731976	2013 TK_{181}	—	October 2, 2013	Kitt Peak	Spacewatch	·	990 m	MPC · JPL
731977	2013 TW_{183}	—	March 1, 2010	WISE	WISE	·	2.6 km	MPC · JPL
731978	2013 TU_{188}	—	April 16, 2010	WISE	WISE	L5	9.5 km	MPC · JPL
731979	2013 TZ_{192}	—	October 5, 2013	Haleakala	Pan-STARRS 1	·	2.1 km	MPC · JPL
731980	2013 TH_{193}	—	October 3, 2013	Mount Lemmon	Mount Lemmon Survey	·	2.4 km	MPC · JPL
731981	2013 TW_{195}	—	November 20, 2008	Kitt Peak	Spacewatch	·	2.1 km	MPC · JPL
731982	2013 TA_{196}	—	October 5, 2013	Haleakala	Pan-STARRS 1	·	590 m	MPC · JPL
731983	2013 TB_{196}	—	October 9, 2013	Kitt Peak	Spacewatch	·	820 m	MPC · JPL
731984	2013 TV_{196}	—	October 4, 2013	Mount Lemmon	Mount Lemmon Survey	TIR	2.7 km	MPC · JPL
731985	2013 TY_{198}	—	October 3, 2013	Haleakala	Pan-STARRS 1	·	2.5 km	MPC · JPL
731986	2013 TW_{200}	—	October 9, 2013	Mount Lemmon	Mount Lemmon Survey	L5	7.4 km	MPC · JPL
731987	2013 TY_{203}	—	October 7, 2013	Kitt Peak	Spacewatch	V	530 m	MPC · JPL
731988	2013 TL_{204}	—	October 3, 2013	Haleakala	Pan-STARRS 1	EOS	1.6 km	MPC · JPL
731989	2013 TN_{204}	—	October 3, 2013	Kitt Peak	Spacewatch	EOS	1.7 km	MPC · JPL
731990	2013 TT_{204}	—	October 3, 2013	Haleakala	Pan-STARRS 1	·	1.5 km	MPC · JPL
731991	2013 TZ_{214}	—	October 2, 2013	Haleakala	Pan-STARRS 1	L5	7.2 km	MPC · JPL
731992	2013 TO_{217}	—	October 13, 2013	Mount Lemmon	Mount Lemmon Survey	·	2.2 km	MPC · JPL
731993	2013 TY_{217}	—	October 5, 2013	Haleakala	Pan-STARRS 1	·	2.1 km	MPC · JPL
731994	2013 TP_{218}	—	October 2, 2013	Kitt Peak	Spacewatch	·	2.6 km	MPC · JPL
731995	2013 TK_{224}	—	September 21, 2001	Apache Point	SDSS Collaboration	EUN	1.0 km	MPC · JPL
731996	2013 TH_{236}	—	October 3, 2013	Kitt Peak	Spacewatch	·	530 m	MPC · JPL
731997	2013 TG_{238}	—	September 15, 2007	Catalina	CSS	·	3.4 km	MPC · JPL
731998	2013 TK_{275}	—	October 12, 2013	Mount Lemmon	Mount Lemmon Survey	·	850 m	MPC · JPL
731999	2013 UZ_{4}	—	December 11, 2009	La Sagra	OAM	·	1.3 km	MPC · JPL
732000	2013 UF_{9}	—	October 23, 2001	Kitt Peak	Spacewatch	L5	10 km	MPC · JPL

back to top

== Meaning of names ==
As minor planet discoveries are confirmed, they are given a permanent number by the IAU's Minor Planet Center (MPC), and the discoverers can then submit names for them, following the IAU's naming conventions. The list below concerns those minor planets in the specified number-range that have received names, and explains the meanings of those names.

Official naming citations of newly named small Solar System bodies are approved and published in a bulletin by IAU's Working Group for Small Bodies Nomenclature (WGSBN). Before May 2021, citations were published in MPC's Minor Planet Circulars for many decades. Recent citations can also be found on the JPL Small-Body Database (SBDB). Until his death in 2016, German astronomer Lutz D. Schmadel compiled these citations into the Dictionary of Minor Planet Names (DMP) and regularly updated the collection.

Based on Paul Herget's The Names of the Minor Planets, Schmadel also researched the unclear origin of numerous asteroids, most of which had been named prior to World War II. This article incorporates text from this source, which is in the public domain: SBDB New namings may only be added to this list below after official publication as the preannouncement of names is condemned. The WGSBN publishes a comprehensive guideline for the naming rules of non-cometary small Solar System bodies.

Named minor planet	Provisional	This minor planet was named for...	Ref · Catalog
731124 Rosvick	2013 AS_{124}	Joanne Rosvick (born 1965), Canadian associate professor of physics at the Thomson River University.	IAU · 731124
731389 Jensdierks	2013 EA_{40}	Jens Dierks, German radio and television technician and amateur astronomer.	IAU · 731389
731678 Philippschäfer	2013 PN_{25}	Philipp Schäfer, German philanthropist, is vice president of Achern Miteinander, a nonprofit German organization that focuses on social integration and community support. He also leads initiatives at the Rotary Club Achern-Bühl.	IAU · 731678
731716 Käszlaci	2013 PD_{101}	László Käsz (b. 1967), widely known as “Käszlaci”, is a Hungarian amateur astronomer, observer, and astronomy club leader in Bóly.	IAU · 731716
731815 Stefanberg	2013 RN_{95}	Stefan Berg, German software developer.	IAU · 731815
