= List of minor planets: 543001–544000 =

The following is a partial list of minor planets, running from minor-planet number 543001 through 544000, inclusive. The primary data for this and other partial lists is based on JPL's "Small-Body Orbital Elements" and data available from the Minor Planet Center. Critical list information is also provided by the MPC, unless otherwise specified from Lowell Observatory. A detailed description of the table's columns and additional sources are given on the main page including a complete list of every page in this series, and a statistical break-up on the dynamical classification of minor planets.

Also see the summary list of all named bodies in numerical and alphabetical order, and the corresponding naming citations for the number range of this particular list. New namings may only be added to this list after official publication, as the preannouncement of names is condemned by the Working Group for Small Bodies Nomenclature of the International Astronomical Union.

| Near-Earth obj. | MBA (inner) | MBA (outer) | Centaur |
| Mars-crosser | MBA (middle) | Jupiter trojan | Trans-Neptunian obj. |
| Unclassified |

== 543001–543100 ==
| Designation | | | Discovery | | | Properties | | Ref |
| Permanent | Provisional | Named after | Date | Site | Discoverer(s) | Category | Diam. | Ref |
|---|---|---|---|---|---|---|---|---|
| 543001 | 2013 QX_{83} | — | March 9, 2008 | Kitt Peak | Spacewatch | · | 1.5 km | MPC · JPL |
| 543002 | 2013 QL_{84} | — | September 13, 2007 | Mount Lemmon | Mount Lemmon Survey | · | 3.0 km | MPC · JPL |
| 543003 | 2013 QL_{85} | — | February 8, 2011 | Mount Lemmon | Mount Lemmon Survey | · | 1.6 km | MPC · JPL |
| 543004 | 2013 QX_{85} | — | January 21, 2002 | Kitt Peak | Spacewatch | · | 1.6 km | MPC · JPL |
| 543005 | 2013 QU_{88} | — | August 7, 2013 | ESA OGS | ESA OGS | · | 1.7 km | MPC · JPL |
| 543006 | 2013 QD_{89} | — | March 6, 2011 | Mount Lemmon | Mount Lemmon Survey | · | 2.2 km | MPC · JPL |
| 543007 | 2013 QF_{93} | — | April 15, 2008 | Mount Lemmon | Mount Lemmon Survey | · | 1.6 km | MPC · JPL |
| 543008 | 2013 QM_{93} | — | August 26, 2013 | Haleakala | Pan-STARRS 1 | · | 3.1 km | MPC · JPL |
| 543009 | 2013 QR_{93} | — | August 15, 2013 | Haleakala | Pan-STARRS 1 | · | 1.7 km | MPC · JPL |
| 543010 | 2013 QR_{95} | — | February 21, 2007 | Kitt Peak | Spacewatch | H | 440 m | MPC · JPL |
| 543011 | 2013 QT_{95} | — | January 30, 2012 | Catalina | CSS | H | 580 m | MPC · JPL |
| 543012 | 2013 RB_{1} | — | September 1, 2013 | Mount Lemmon | Mount Lemmon Survey | · | 2.1 km | MPC · JPL |
| 543013 | 2013 RE_{1} | — | September 1, 2013 | Mount Lemmon | Mount Lemmon Survey | · | 740 m | MPC · JPL |
| 543014 | 2013 RM_{6} | — | September 24, 2008 | Kitt Peak | Spacewatch | · | 1.9 km | MPC · JPL |
| 543015 | 2013 RB_{14} | — | July 30, 2013 | Kitt Peak | Spacewatch | · | 1.5 km | MPC · JPL |
| 543016 | 2013 RN_{14} | — | July 30, 2013 | Kitt Peak | Spacewatch | · | 2.5 km | MPC · JPL |
| 543017 | 2013 RH_{16} | — | June 18, 2013 | Catalina | CSS | · | 3.6 km | MPC · JPL |
| 543018 ROTAT | 2013 RF_{18} | ROTAT | September 1, 2013 | SATINO Remote | J. Jahn | AGN | 1.1 km | MPC · JPL |
| 543019 | 2013 RQ_{18} | — | May 15, 2012 | Haleakala | Pan-STARRS 1 | · | 3.1 km | MPC · JPL |
| 543020 | 2013 RD_{20} | — | September 1, 2013 | Mount Lemmon | Mount Lemmon Survey | · | 2.4 km | MPC · JPL |
| 543021 | 2013 RK_{20} | — | September 19, 2003 | Kitt Peak | Spacewatch | KOR | 1.7 km | MPC · JPL |
| 543022 | 2013 RD_{23} | — | August 12, 2013 | Haleakala | Pan-STARRS 1 | · | 1.5 km | MPC · JPL |
| 543023 | 2013 RE_{24} | — | March 4, 2005 | Kitt Peak | Spacewatch | EOS | 2.1 km | MPC · JPL |
| 543024 | 2013 RV_{29} | — | September 5, 2013 | Elena Remote | Oreshko, A. | · | 2.7 km | MPC · JPL |
| 543025 | 2013 RM_{32} | — | May 30, 1997 | Kitt Peak | Spacewatch | · | 2.3 km | MPC · JPL |
| 543026 | 2013 RQ_{32} | — | November 30, 2003 | Kitt Peak | Spacewatch | · | 2.1 km | MPC · JPL |
| 543027 | 2013 RW_{33} | — | September 2, 2013 | Catalina | CSS | · | 3.2 km | MPC · JPL |
| 543028 | 2013 RA_{34} | — | March 31, 2011 | Haleakala | Pan-STARRS 1 | · | 3.5 km | MPC · JPL |
| 543029 | 2013 RM_{35} | — | October 16, 2002 | Palomar | NEAT | · | 2.7 km | MPC · JPL |
| 543030 | 2013 RX_{35} | — | November 13, 2002 | Palomar | NEAT | TIR | 3.3 km | MPC · JPL |
| 543031 | 2013 RW_{39} | — | March 9, 2005 | Mount Lemmon | Mount Lemmon Survey | · | 2.6 km | MPC · JPL |
| 543032 | 2013 RA_{42} | — | September 6, 2013 | Elena Remote | Oreshko, A. | TIR | 2.7 km | MPC · JPL |
| 543033 | 2013 RF_{42} | — | September 8, 2013 | Elena Remote | Oreshko, A. | · | 2.6 km | MPC · JPL |
| 543034 | 2013 RM_{42} | — | August 27, 2005 | Anderson Mesa | LONEOS | H | 630 m | MPC · JPL |
| 543035 | 2013 RC_{43} | — | October 9, 2008 | Mount Lemmon | Mount Lemmon Survey | H | 430 m | MPC · JPL |
| 543036 | 2013 RN_{44} | — | September 15, 2002 | Palomar | NEAT | · | 3.5 km | MPC · JPL |
| 543037 | 2013 RG_{46} | — | February 13, 2010 | Mount Lemmon | Mount Lemmon Survey | · | 2.1 km | MPC · JPL |
| 543038 | 2013 RU_{46} | — | September 10, 2013 | Haleakala | Pan-STARRS 1 | · | 2.2 km | MPC · JPL |
| 543039 | 2013 RW_{46} | — | March 12, 2007 | Kitt Peak | Spacewatch | · | 2.4 km | MPC · JPL |
| 543040 | 2013 RT_{49} | — | August 18, 2002 | Palomar | NEAT | EOS | 1.6 km | MPC · JPL |
| 543041 | 2013 RZ_{50} | — | September 10, 2013 | Haleakala | Pan-STARRS 1 | EUP | 2.5 km | MPC · JPL |
| 543042 | 2013 RM_{51} | — | October 10, 2008 | Mount Lemmon | Mount Lemmon Survey | EOS | 2.0 km | MPC · JPL |
| 543043 | 2013 RY_{52} | — | February 14, 2004 | Kitt Peak | Spacewatch | · | 2.9 km | MPC · JPL |
| 543044 | 2013 RA_{57} | — | September 14, 2002 | Palomar | NEAT | · | 3.0 km | MPC · JPL |
| 543045 | 2013 RK_{57} | — | October 26, 2009 | Mount Lemmon | Mount Lemmon Survey | · | 2.0 km | MPC · JPL |
| 543046 | 2013 RT_{57} | — | September 10, 2013 | Haleakala | Pan-STARRS 1 | TIR | 2.2 km | MPC · JPL |
| 543047 | 2013 RT_{59} | — | January 11, 2010 | Mount Lemmon | Mount Lemmon Survey | · | 2.8 km | MPC · JPL |
| 543048 | 2013 RY_{63} | — | September 27, 2008 | Mount Lemmon | Mount Lemmon Survey | · | 2.0 km | MPC · JPL |
| 543049 | 2013 RB_{64} | — | August 14, 2013 | Haleakala | Pan-STARRS 1 | · | 1.6 km | MPC · JPL |
| 543050 | 2013 RG_{68} | — | May 6, 2006 | Mount Lemmon | Mount Lemmon Survey | · | 4.2 km | MPC · JPL |
| 543051 | 2013 RH_{68} | — | June 6, 2011 | Haleakala | Pan-STARRS 1 | · | 3.5 km | MPC · JPL |
| 543052 | 2013 RH_{71} | — | September 10, 2007 | Catalina | CSS | · | 3.0 km | MPC · JPL |
| 543053 | 2013 RA_{85} | — | February 1, 2005 | Kitt Peak | Spacewatch | EOS | 2.2 km | MPC · JPL |
| 543054 | 2013 RK_{88} | — | September 13, 2002 | Palomar | NEAT | · | 2.5 km | MPC · JPL |
| 543055 | 2013 RC_{89} | — | October 4, 2002 | Palomar | NEAT | · | 3.6 km | MPC · JPL |
| 543056 | 2013 RS_{91} | — | September 14, 2013 | Charleston | R. Holmes | INA | 2.3 km | MPC · JPL |
| 543057 | 2013 RZ_{92} | — | September 14, 2013 | Kitt Peak | Spacewatch | · | 2.4 km | MPC · JPL |
| 543058 | 2013 RG_{93} | — | September 6, 2013 | Kitt Peak | Spacewatch | TIR | 2.1 km | MPC · JPL |
| 543059 | 2013 RC_{95} | — | August 23, 2007 | Kitt Peak | Spacewatch | · | 3.2 km | MPC · JPL |
| 543060 Liefke | 2013 RQ_{95} | Liefke | September 5, 2013 | SATINO Remote | J. Jahn | · | 2.2 km | MPC · JPL |
| 543061 Ruthsager | 2013 RS_{97} | Ruthsager | September 5, 2007 | Catalina | CSS | · | 3.1 km | MPC · JPL |
| 543062 | 2013 RJ_{100} | — | February 9, 2005 | Mount Lemmon | Mount Lemmon Survey | · | 1.8 km | MPC · JPL |
| 543063 | 2013 RK_{100} | — | September 1, 2013 | Mount Lemmon | Mount Lemmon Survey | · | 2.5 km | MPC · JPL |
| 543064 | 2013 RT_{100} | — | November 17, 2008 | Kitt Peak | Spacewatch | THM | 1.8 km | MPC · JPL |
| 543065 | 2013 RZ_{101} | — | December 1, 2008 | Mount Lemmon | Mount Lemmon Survey | · | 2.0 km | MPC · JPL |
| 543066 | 2013 RE_{103} | — | February 21, 2001 | Kitt Peak | Spacewatch | KOR | 1.1 km | MPC · JPL |
| 543067 | 2013 RC_{104} | — | February 10, 2003 | Bergisch Gladbach | W. Bickel | · | 1.5 km | MPC · JPL |
| 543068 | 2013 RW_{104} | — | September 11, 2007 | Kitt Peak | Spacewatch | · | 2.2 km | MPC · JPL |
| 543069 | 2013 RK_{106} | — | September 14, 2013 | Mount Lemmon | Mount Lemmon Survey | · | 2.7 km | MPC · JPL |
| 543070 | 2013 RL_{106} | — | September 14, 2013 | Mount Lemmon | Mount Lemmon Survey | · | 1.8 km | MPC · JPL |
| 543071 | 2013 RK_{107} | — | September 15, 2013 | Mount Lemmon | Mount Lemmon Survey | · | 1.9 km | MPC · JPL |
| 543072 | 2013 RC_{108} | — | September 13, 2013 | Mount Lemmon | Mount Lemmon Survey | · | 2.8 km | MPC · JPL |
| 543073 | 2013 RT_{108} | — | September 4, 2007 | Mount Lemmon | Mount Lemmon Survey | HYG | 2.3 km | MPC · JPL |
| 543074 | 2013 RV_{108} | — | September 12, 2013 | Mount Lemmon | Mount Lemmon Survey | · | 2.1 km | MPC · JPL |
| 543075 | 2013 SR_{11} | — | September 27, 2008 | Mount Lemmon | Mount Lemmon Survey | HYG | 2.6 km | MPC · JPL |
| 543076 | 2013 SU_{16} | — | August 29, 2013 | Haleakala | Pan-STARRS 1 | · | 2.5 km | MPC · JPL |
| 543077 | 2013 SU_{20} | — | November 24, 2008 | Mount Lemmon | Mount Lemmon Survey | H | 700 m | MPC · JPL |
| 543078 | 2013 SV_{21} | — | September 7, 2013 | Charleston | R. Holmes | · | 2.4 km | MPC · JPL |
| 543079 | 2013 SN_{22} | — | September 27, 2002 | Palomar | NEAT | · | 3.5 km | MPC · JPL |
| 543080 | 2013 SQ_{25} | — | April 2, 2011 | Mount Lemmon | Mount Lemmon Survey | EOS | 1.9 km | MPC · JPL |
| 543081 Albertducrocq | 2013 SC_{26} | Albertducrocq | August 15, 2013 | Oukaïmeden | M. Ory | · | 2.4 km | MPC · JPL |
| 543082 | 2013 SQ_{26} | — | September 14, 2013 | Catalina | CSS | · | 3.1 km | MPC · JPL |
| 543083 | 2013 SG_{27} | — | November 9, 2008 | Kitt Peak | Spacewatch | THM | 2.3 km | MPC · JPL |
| 543084 | 2013 SD_{28} | — | September 5, 2007 | Dauban | C. Rinner, F. Kugel | · | 2.9 km | MPC · JPL |
| 543085 | 2013 SM_{28} | — | September 29, 2013 | Palomar | Palomar Transient Factory | · | 2.2 km | MPC · JPL |
| 543086 | 2013 SW_{28} | — | September 30, 2013 | Oukaïmeden | C. Rinner | EOS | 2.0 km | MPC · JPL |
| 543087 | 2013 SA_{32} | — | September 3, 2013 | ISON-Kislovodsk | Nevski, V. | · | 3.0 km | MPC · JPL |
| 543088 | 2013 SG_{32} | — | October 23, 2008 | Mount Lemmon | Mount Lemmon Survey | · | 1.7 km | MPC · JPL |
| 543089 | 2013 SW_{33} | — | September 2, 2013 | Mount Lemmon | Mount Lemmon Survey | · | 1.8 km | MPC · JPL |
| 543090 | 2013 SG_{35} | — | September 2, 2013 | Mount Lemmon | Mount Lemmon Survey | · | 2.0 km | MPC · JPL |
| 543091 | 2013 SG_{37} | — | September 9, 2013 | Haleakala | Pan-STARRS 1 | · | 2.7 km | MPC · JPL |
| 543092 | 2013 SP_{37} | — | November 16, 2009 | Kitt Peak | Spacewatch | KOR | 1.5 km | MPC · JPL |
| 543093 | 2013 SD_{38} | — | September 23, 2008 | Kitt Peak | Spacewatch | · | 1.8 km | MPC · JPL |
| 543094 | 2013 SZ_{38} | — | April 2, 2005 | Mount Lemmon | Mount Lemmon Survey | · | 2.9 km | MPC · JPL |
| 543095 | 2013 SC_{39} | — | August 28, 2013 | Mount Lemmon | Mount Lemmon Survey | · | 2.0 km | MPC · JPL |
| 543096 | 2013 SJ_{41} | — | January 5, 2011 | Catalina | CSS | · | 2.0 km | MPC · JPL |
| 543097 | 2013 SF_{42} | — | September 9, 2013 | Haleakala | Pan-STARRS 1 | · | 1.9 km | MPC · JPL |
| 543098 | 2013 SV_{42} | — | September 14, 2013 | Haleakala | Pan-STARRS 1 | · | 2.5 km | MPC · JPL |
| 543099 | 2013 SJ_{43} | — | May 24, 2006 | Kitt Peak | Spacewatch | LIX | 3.5 km | MPC · JPL |
| 543100 | 2013 SX_{43} | — | September 14, 2013 | Haleakala | Pan-STARRS 1 | · | 2.6 km | MPC · JPL |

== 543101–543200 ==
back to top

| Designation | | | Discovery | | | Properties | | Ref |
| Permanent | Provisional | Named after | Date | Site | Discoverer(s) | Category | Diam. | Ref |
|---|---|---|---|---|---|---|---|---|
| 543101 | 2013 SF_{45} | — | September 1, 2013 | Mount Lemmon | Mount Lemmon Survey | · | 1.9 km | MPC · JPL |
| 543102 | 2013 SB_{47} | — | September 12, 2002 | Palomar | NEAT | EOS | 1.8 km | MPC · JPL |
| 543103 | 2013 SJ_{48} | — | September 28, 2013 | Mount Lemmon | Mount Lemmon Survey | · | 2.6 km | MPC · JPL |
| 543104 | 2013 SM_{48} | — | October 20, 2003 | Kitt Peak | Spacewatch | · | 1.6 km | MPC · JPL |
| 543105 | 2013 SP_{49} | — | September 4, 2002 | Palomar | NEAT | · | 2.0 km | MPC · JPL |
| 543106 | 2013 SE_{50} | — | November 21, 2008 | Kitt Peak | Spacewatch | · | 2.4 km | MPC · JPL |
| 543107 | 2013 SJ_{50} | — | September 28, 2013 | Mount Lemmon | Mount Lemmon Survey | · | 2.9 km | MPC · JPL |
| 543108 | 2013 SM_{52} | — | August 10, 2007 | Kitt Peak | Spacewatch | TIR | 2.2 km | MPC · JPL |
| 543109 | 2013 SP_{56} | — | September 25, 2013 | Catalina | CSS | · | 3.1 km | MPC · JPL |
| 543110 | 2013 SU_{57} | — | September 30, 2013 | Mount Lemmon | Mount Lemmon Survey | · | 2.8 km | MPC · JPL |
| 543111 | 2013 SK_{59} | — | September 15, 2002 | Palomar | NEAT | EOS | 1.6 km | MPC · JPL |
| 543112 | 2013 SH_{60} | — | December 2, 2008 | Catalina | CSS | · | 3.0 km | MPC · JPL |
| 543113 | 2013 SX_{60} | — | November 7, 2005 | Mauna Kea | A. Boattini | · | 2.5 km | MPC · JPL |
| 543114 | 2013 SV_{63} | — | October 25, 2009 | Kitt Peak | Spacewatch | MRX | 1.0 km | MPC · JPL |
| 543115 | 2013 SD_{64} | — | February 14, 2010 | Mount Lemmon | Mount Lemmon Survey | · | 2.1 km | MPC · JPL |
| 543116 | 2013 SG_{64} | — | September 18, 2003 | Kitt Peak | Spacewatch | · | 1.7 km | MPC · JPL |
| 543117 | 2013 ST_{64} | — | August 13, 2013 | Kitt Peak | Spacewatch | · | 2.6 km | MPC · JPL |
| 543118 | 2013 SQ_{67} | — | September 9, 2013 | Haleakala | Pan-STARRS 1 | · | 2.7 km | MPC · JPL |
| 543119 | 2013 SJ_{71} | — | August 12, 2013 | Kitt Peak | Spacewatch | H | 530 m | MPC · JPL |
| 543120 | 2013 SX_{71} | — | September 15, 2002 | Palomar | NEAT | · | 2.7 km | MPC · JPL |
| 543121 | 2013 SE_{73} | — | September 25, 2013 | Catalina | CSS | · | 3.4 km | MPC · JPL |
| 543122 | 2013 SM_{73} | — | October 23, 2008 | Kitt Peak | Spacewatch | · | 1.8 km | MPC · JPL |
| 543123 | 2013 SP_{76} | — | December 3, 2008 | Mount Lemmon | Mount Lemmon Survey | · | 3.0 km | MPC · JPL |
| 543124 | 2013 SJ_{79} | — | November 14, 2002 | Palomar | NEAT | · | 2.8 km | MPC · JPL |
| 543125 | 2013 SP_{82} | — | August 17, 2002 | Palomar | NEAT | · | 2.5 km | MPC · JPL |
| 543126 | 2013 SZ_{83} | — | September 3, 2007 | Catalina | CSS | T_{j} (2.99) | 3.2 km | MPC · JPL |
| 543127 | 2013 SW_{84} | — | October 2, 2013 | Palomar | Palomar Transient Factory | · | 3.1 km | MPC · JPL |
| 543128 | 2013 SK_{101} | — | November 21, 2008 | Kitt Peak | Spacewatch | · | 3.4 km | MPC · JPL |
| 543129 | 2013 TE_{1} | — | September 26, 2013 | Catalina | CSS | · | 2.8 km | MPC · JPL |
| 543130 | 2013 TC_{2} | — | November 20, 2008 | Kitt Peak | Spacewatch | · | 2.5 km | MPC · JPL |
| 543131 | 2013 TH_{3} | — | September 30, 2013 | Mount Lemmon | Mount Lemmon Survey | · | 2.0 km | MPC · JPL |
| 543132 | 2013 TE_{5} | — | March 27, 2012 | Haleakala | Pan-STARRS 1 | · | 1.2 km | MPC · JPL |
| 543133 | 2013 TX_{9} | — | September 13, 2002 | Palomar | NEAT | · | 3.5 km | MPC · JPL |
| 543134 | 2013 TM_{10} | — | October 3, 2013 | Elena Remote | Oreshko, A. | HYG | 2.0 km | MPC · JPL |
| 543135 | 2013 TW_{11} | — | December 29, 2008 | Farra d'Isonzo | Farra d'Isonzo | · | 2.4 km | MPC · JPL |
| 543136 | 2013 TZ_{12} | — | September 24, 2008 | Mount Lemmon | Mount Lemmon Survey | · | 2.4 km | MPC · JPL |
| 543137 | 2013 TL_{13} | — | October 1, 2013 | Kitt Peak | Spacewatch | · | 2.8 km | MPC · JPL |
| 543138 | 2013 TE_{14} | — | April 7, 2006 | Kitt Peak | Spacewatch | · | 1.9 km | MPC · JPL |
| 543139 | 2013 TG_{17} | — | November 25, 2002 | Palomar | NEAT | LIX | 2.9 km | MPC · JPL |
| 543140 | 2013 TP_{17} | — | September 6, 2008 | Kitt Peak | Spacewatch | (18466) | 2.3 km | MPC · JPL |
| 543141 | 2013 TQ_{17} | — | October 24, 2008 | Kitt Peak | Spacewatch | · | 1.7 km | MPC · JPL |
| 543142 | 2013 TD_{22} | — | October 1, 2013 | Mount Lemmon | Mount Lemmon Survey | · | 2.1 km | MPC · JPL |
| 543143 | 2013 TK_{23} | — | October 1, 2013 | Kitt Peak | Spacewatch | · | 2.8 km | MPC · JPL |
| 543144 | 2013 TH_{30} | — | October 1, 2013 | Kitt Peak | Spacewatch | · | 2.9 km | MPC · JPL |
| 543145 | 2013 TV_{30} | — | July 14, 2013 | Haleakala | Pan-STARRS 1 | · | 3.1 km | MPC · JPL |
| 543146 | 2013 TW_{31} | — | August 25, 2003 | Palomar | NEAT | · | 2.3 km | MPC · JPL |
| 543147 | 2013 TK_{34} | — | September 14, 2013 | Catalina | CSS | · | 2.6 km | MPC · JPL |
| 543148 | 2013 TV_{36} | — | September 15, 2013 | Catalina | CSS | · | 3.9 km | MPC · JPL |
| 543149 | 2013 TL_{39} | — | October 6, 1996 | Kitt Peak | Spacewatch | · | 2.3 km | MPC · JPL |
| 543150 | 2013 TO_{39} | — | September 25, 2013 | Catalina | CSS | · | 3.4 km | MPC · JPL |
| 543151 | 2013 TQ_{39} | — | October 2, 2013 | Mount Lemmon | Mount Lemmon Survey | · | 2.8 km | MPC · JPL |
| 543152 | 2013 TQ_{41} | — | November 8, 2008 | Mount Lemmon | Mount Lemmon Survey | · | 2.0 km | MPC · JPL |
| 543153 | 2013 TE_{42} | — | October 2, 2013 | Mount Lemmon | Mount Lemmon Survey | · | 2.0 km | MPC · JPL |
| 543154 | 2013 TM_{42} | — | October 3, 2013 | Palomar | Palomar Transient Factory | · | 3.5 km | MPC · JPL |
| 543155 | 2013 TY_{42} | — | September 10, 2007 | Mount Lemmon | Mount Lemmon Survey | · | 2.3 km | MPC · JPL |
| 543156 | 2013 TD_{43} | — | October 3, 2013 | Kitt Peak | Spacewatch | · | 3.0 km | MPC · JPL |
| 543157 | 2013 TH_{44} | — | April 28, 2011 | Haleakala | Pan-STARRS 1 | · | 3.3 km | MPC · JPL |
| 543158 | 2013 TQ_{44} | — | October 3, 2013 | Mount Lemmon | Mount Lemmon Survey | · | 2.6 km | MPC · JPL |
| 543159 | 2013 TE_{48} | — | October 15, 2007 | Mount Lemmon | Mount Lemmon Survey | · | 3.0 km | MPC · JPL |
| 543160 | 2013 TH_{48} | — | September 29, 2008 | Kitt Peak | Spacewatch | · | 1.9 km | MPC · JPL |
| 543161 | 2013 TC_{50} | — | October 3, 2013 | Haleakala | Pan-STARRS 1 | · | 1.7 km | MPC · JPL |
| 543162 | 2013 TN_{50} | — | October 21, 2008 | Kitt Peak | Spacewatch | EOS | 1.6 km | MPC · JPL |
| 543163 | 2013 TE_{53} | — | October 4, 2013 | Kitt Peak | Spacewatch | · | 3.9 km | MPC · JPL |
| 543164 | 2013 TF_{54} | — | October 4, 2013 | Mount Lemmon | Mount Lemmon Survey | · | 3.0 km | MPC · JPL |
| 543165 | 2013 TD_{56} | — | January 30, 2012 | Mount Lemmon | Mount Lemmon Survey | · | 2.0 km | MPC · JPL |
| 543166 | 2013 TL_{56} | — | February 12, 2002 | Kitt Peak | Spacewatch | GEF | 960 m | MPC · JPL |
| 543167 | 2013 TO_{58} | — | October 4, 2013 | Catalina | CSS | · | 3.2 km | MPC · JPL |
| 543168 | 2013 TG_{61} | — | October 4, 2013 | Mount Lemmon | Mount Lemmon Survey | TIR | 2.9 km | MPC · JPL |
| 543169 | 2013 TC_{63} | — | September 13, 2013 | Mount Lemmon | Mount Lemmon Survey | · | 2.9 km | MPC · JPL |
| 543170 | 2013 TA_{66} | — | December 20, 2009 | Kitt Peak | Spacewatch | · | 2.4 km | MPC · JPL |
| 543171 | 2013 TH_{67} | — | October 10, 2008 | Mount Lemmon | Mount Lemmon Survey | EOS | 1.6 km | MPC · JPL |
| 543172 | 2013 TU_{67} | — | January 8, 2011 | Mount Lemmon | Mount Lemmon Survey | · | 2.0 km | MPC · JPL |
| 543173 | 2013 TY_{72} | — | February 16, 2010 | Kitt Peak | Spacewatch | HYG | 2.8 km | MPC · JPL |
| 543174 | 2013 TV_{73} | — | May 19, 2012 | Mount Lemmon | Mount Lemmon Survey | · | 3.2 km | MPC · JPL |
| 543175 | 2013 TW_{73} | — | October 3, 2013 | Kitt Peak | Spacewatch | · | 2.3 km | MPC · JPL |
| 543176 | 2013 TB_{75} | — | November 25, 2002 | Palomar | NEAT | · | 2.6 km | MPC · JPL |
| 543177 | 2013 TL_{75} | — | October 3, 2013 | Haleakala | Pan-STARRS 1 | · | 2.9 km | MPC · JPL |
| 543178 | 2013 TA_{76} | — | October 24, 2009 | Kitt Peak | Spacewatch | · | 1.8 km | MPC · JPL |
| 543179 | 2013 TL_{87} | — | October 4, 2007 | Mount Lemmon | Mount Lemmon Survey | · | 2.8 km | MPC · JPL |
| 543180 | 2013 TV_{88} | — | May 31, 2001 | Kitt Peak | Spacewatch | · | 2.3 km | MPC · JPL |
| 543181 | 2013 TP_{91} | — | February 14, 2010 | Calvin-Rehoboth | L. A. Molnar | EOS | 1.8 km | MPC · JPL |
| 543182 | 2013 TK_{93} | — | October 1, 2013 | Kitt Peak | Spacewatch | · | 2.3 km | MPC · JPL |
| 543183 | 2013 TO_{94} | — | September 15, 2013 | Haleakala | Pan-STARRS 1 | · | 2.5 km | MPC · JPL |
| 543184 | 2013 TQ_{94} | — | October 1, 2013 | Kitt Peak | Spacewatch | · | 2.6 km | MPC · JPL |
| 543185 | 2013 TG_{96} | — | December 3, 2002 | Palomar | NEAT | · | 2.7 km | MPC · JPL |
| 543186 | 2013 TM_{100} | — | March 8, 2005 | Kitt Peak | Spacewatch | · | 3.8 km | MPC · JPL |
| 543187 | 2013 TJ_{101} | — | September 15, 2002 | Palomar | NEAT | EOS | 2.2 km | MPC · JPL |
| 543188 | 2013 TZ_{101} | — | May 4, 2005 | Mauna Kea | Veillet, C. | EOS | 1.8 km | MPC · JPL |
| 543189 | 2013 TW_{105} | — | December 5, 2008 | Mount Lemmon | Mount Lemmon Survey | · | 1.9 km | MPC · JPL |
| 543190 | 2013 TF_{107} | — | July 16, 2013 | Haleakala | Pan-STARRS 1 | · | 3.0 km | MPC · JPL |
| 543191 | 2013 TQ_{107} | — | September 11, 2007 | Kitt Peak | Spacewatch | THM | 2.3 km | MPC · JPL |
| 543192 | 2013 TN_{108} | — | April 28, 2012 | Kitt Peak | Spacewatch | · | 720 m | MPC · JPL |
| 543193 | 2013 TN_{109} | — | October 3, 2013 | Kitt Peak | Spacewatch | · | 2.7 km | MPC · JPL |
| 543194 | 2013 TH_{110} | — | December 5, 2008 | Kitt Peak | Spacewatch | · | 3.0 km | MPC · JPL |
| 543195 | 2013 TS_{110} | — | April 21, 2007 | Cerro Tololo | Deep Ecliptic Survey | · | 2.7 km | MPC · JPL |
| 543196 | 2013 TR_{113} | — | June 2, 2011 | Haleakala | Pan-STARRS 1 | · | 2.7 km | MPC · JPL |
| 543197 | 2013 TE_{114} | — | October 9, 2002 | Palomar | NEAT | · | 3.5 km | MPC · JPL |
| 543198 Rastislavmráz | 2013 TT_{115} | Rastislavmráz | September 5, 2013 | Piszkéstető | T. Csörgei, K. Sárneczky | · | 3.2 km | MPC · JPL |
| 543199 | 2013 TG_{120} | — | September 12, 2002 | Palomar | NEAT | · | 1.9 km | MPC · JPL |
| 543200 | 2013 TK_{123} | — | September 15, 2013 | Haleakala | Pan-STARRS 1 | HYG | 2.5 km | MPC · JPL |

== 543201–543300 ==
back to top

| Designation | | | Discovery | | | Properties | | Ref |
| Permanent | Provisional | Named after | Date | Site | Discoverer(s) | Category | Diam. | Ref |
|---|---|---|---|---|---|---|---|---|
| 543201 | 2013 TD_{124} | — | October 15, 2007 | Kitt Peak | Spacewatch | · | 890 m | MPC · JPL |
| 543202 | 2013 TM_{124} | — | September 7, 2008 | Mount Lemmon | Mount Lemmon Survey | · | 1.7 km | MPC · JPL |
| 543203 | 2013 TZ_{126} | — | June 16, 2012 | Kitt Peak | Spacewatch | · | 3.5 km | MPC · JPL |
| 543204 | 2013 TA_{127} | — | May 20, 2006 | Mount Lemmon | Mount Lemmon Survey | · | 2.8 km | MPC · JPL |
| 543205 | 2013 TG_{128} | — | May 22, 2006 | Kitt Peak | Spacewatch | · | 3.1 km | MPC · JPL |
| 543206 | 2013 TS_{128} | — | September 10, 2013 | Haleakala | Pan-STARRS 1 | EOS | 1.8 km | MPC · JPL |
| 543207 | 2013 TV_{129} | — | November 9, 2008 | Mount Lemmon | Mount Lemmon Survey | · | 2.2 km | MPC · JPL |
| 543208 | 2013 TS_{133} | — | December 5, 2008 | Mount Lemmon | Mount Lemmon Survey | · | 1.7 km | MPC · JPL |
| 543209 | 2013 TB_{134} | — | September 5, 2013 | Kitt Peak | Spacewatch | · | 2.4 km | MPC · JPL |
| 543210 | 2013 TJ_{134} | — | March 27, 2011 | Mount Lemmon | Mount Lemmon Survey | · | 3.4 km | MPC · JPL |
| 543211 | 2013 TG_{139} | — | August 13, 2007 | Siding Spring | SSS | T_{j} (2.99) | 3.2 km | MPC · JPL |
| 543212 | 2013 TD_{141} | — | September 20, 2007 | Kitt Peak | Spacewatch | · | 2.9 km | MPC · JPL |
| 543213 | 2013 TM_{143} | — | September 27, 2013 | Haleakala | Pan-STARRS 1 | · | 2.7 km | MPC · JPL |
| 543214 | 2013 TZ_{144} | — | September 13, 2013 | Catalina | CSS | · | 2.9 km | MPC · JPL |
| 543215 | 2013 TC_{147} | — | November 22, 2009 | Kitt Peak | Spacewatch | KOR | 1.1 km | MPC · JPL |
| 543216 | 2013 TU_{148} | — | September 3, 2008 | Kitt Peak | Spacewatch | · | 2.2 km | MPC · JPL |
| 543217 | 2013 TO_{161} | — | October 14, 2013 | Mount Lemmon | Mount Lemmon Survey | · | 2.3 km | MPC · JPL |
| 543218 | 2013 TV_{161} | — | August 10, 2007 | Kitt Peak | Spacewatch | · | 2.0 km | MPC · JPL |
| 543219 | 2013 TP_{162} | — | October 3, 2013 | Kitt Peak | Spacewatch | · | 2.3 km | MPC · JPL |
| 543220 | 2013 TP_{165} | — | September 12, 2007 | Catalina | CSS | · | 2.5 km | MPC · JPL |
| 543221 | 2013 TX_{166} | — | March 25, 2011 | Kitt Peak | Spacewatch | · | 2.5 km | MPC · JPL |
| 543222 | 2013 TS_{167} | — | October 2, 2008 | Mount Lemmon | Mount Lemmon Survey | EOS | 1.5 km | MPC · JPL |
| 543223 | 2013 TT_{167} | — | October 3, 2013 | Haleakala | Pan-STARRS 1 | · | 3.0 km | MPC · JPL |
| 543224 | 2013 TQ_{169} | — | October 6, 2013 | Kitt Peak | Spacewatch | · | 2.9 km | MPC · JPL |
| 543225 | 2013 TT_{170} | — | October 13, 2013 | Kitt Peak | Spacewatch | · | 2.3 km | MPC · JPL |
| 543226 | 2013 TO_{172} | — | October 3, 2013 | Kitt Peak | Spacewatch | · | 1.3 km | MPC · JPL |
| 543227 | 2013 UX_{3} | — | January 20, 2012 | Haleakala | Pan-STARRS 1 | H | 430 m | MPC · JPL |
| 543228 | 2013 UY_{4} | — | October 12, 2013 | Catalina | CSS | · | 2.0 km | MPC · JPL |
| 543229 Matiganis | 2013 UC_{6} | Matiganis | October 3, 2013 | Haleakala | Pan-STARRS 1 | · | 3.4 km | MPC · JPL |
| 543230 | 2013 UQ_{6} | — | April 22, 2007 | Kitt Peak | Spacewatch | · | 2.2 km | MPC · JPL |
| 543231 | 2013 UV_{6} | — | July 20, 2013 | Haleakala | Pan-STARRS 1 | T_{j} (2.99) · EUP | 3.4 km | MPC · JPL |
| 543232 | 2013 UE_{7} | — | September 10, 2007 | Catalina | CSS | TIR | 3.0 km | MPC · JPL |
| 543233 | 2013 UF_{7} | — | October 24, 2013 | Palomar | Palomar Transient Factory | · | 2.3 km | MPC · JPL |
| 543234 | 2013 UO_{7} | — | October 13, 2013 | Mount Lemmon | Mount Lemmon Survey | EOS | 2.1 km | MPC · JPL |
| 543235 | 2013 US_{7} | — | September 30, 2013 | Catalina | CSS | · | 2.3 km | MPC · JPL |
| 543236 | 2013 UK_{8} | — | May 26, 2011 | Mount Lemmon | Mount Lemmon Survey | · | 2.3 km | MPC · JPL |
| 543237 | 2013 UW_{10} | — | October 5, 2013 | Haleakala | Pan-STARRS 1 | · | 2.9 km | MPC · JPL |
| 543238 | 2013 UO_{12} | — | October 2, 2002 | Haleakala | NEAT | · | 2.3 km | MPC · JPL |
| 543239 | 2013 UJ_{18} | — | March 28, 2011 | Mount Lemmon | Mount Lemmon Survey | · | 3.3 km | MPC · JPL |
| 543240 | 2013 UK_{18} | — | May 8, 2005 | Kitt Peak | Spacewatch | · | 3.1 km | MPC · JPL |
| 543241 | 2013 UD_{21} | — | October 26, 2013 | Mount Lemmon | Mount Lemmon Survey | · | 1.7 km | MPC · JPL |
| 543242 | 2013 VJ_{1} | — | November 1, 2013 | Catalina | CSS | · | 2.5 km | MPC · JPL |
| 543243 | 2013 VR_{1} | — | November 2, 2013 | Elena Remote | Oreshko, A. | EOS | 1.6 km | MPC · JPL |
| 543244 | 2013 VC_{2} | — | May 28, 2009 | Mount Lemmon | Mount Lemmon Survey | · | 960 m | MPC · JPL |
| 543245 | 2013 VW_{2} | — | September 30, 2013 | Mount Lemmon | Mount Lemmon Survey | · | 3.4 km | MPC · JPL |
| 543246 | 2013 VO_{6} | — | May 3, 2006 | Kitt Peak | Spacewatch | TIR | 3.4 km | MPC · JPL |
| 543247 | 2013 VV_{6} | — | March 9, 2005 | Vail-Jarnac | Jarnac | EOS | 2.0 km | MPC · JPL |
| 543248 | 2013 VG_{9} | — | September 28, 2003 | Anderson Mesa | LONEOS | · | 690 m | MPC · JPL |
| 543249 | 2013 VC_{21} | — | October 15, 2013 | Nogales | M. Schwartz, P. R. Holvorcem | · | 3.6 km | MPC · JPL |
| 543250 | 2013 VB_{22} | — | October 2, 2013 | Kitt Peak | Spacewatch | · | 2.4 km | MPC · JPL |
| 543251 | 2013 VA_{27} | — | December 3, 2008 | Kitt Peak | Spacewatch | · | 2.0 km | MPC · JPL |
| 543252 | 2013 VS_{28} | — | November 7, 2013 | Kitt Peak | Spacewatch | · | 2.7 km | MPC · JPL |
| 543253 | 2013 VX_{29} | — | August 24, 2007 | Kitt Peak | Spacewatch | · | 1.7 km | MPC · JPL |
| 543254 | 2013 VT_{31} | — | November 9, 2013 | Mount Lemmon | Mount Lemmon Survey | EUP | 3.1 km | MPC · JPL |
| 543255 | 2013 WC_{3} | — | November 2, 2013 | Catalina | CSS | · | 2.3 km | MPC · JPL |
| 543256 | 2013 WG_{4} | — | October 14, 2013 | Mount Lemmon | Mount Lemmon Survey | · | 2.0 km | MPC · JPL |
| 543257 | 2013 WY_{5} | — | March 3, 2005 | Kitt Peak | Spacewatch | · | 2.0 km | MPC · JPL |
| 543258 | 2013 WR_{6} | — | October 9, 2013 | Mount Lemmon | Mount Lemmon Survey | · | 2.4 km | MPC · JPL |
| 543259 | 2013 WB_{10} | — | October 9, 2013 | Mount Lemmon | Mount Lemmon Survey | EOS | 2.0 km | MPC · JPL |
| 543260 | 2013 WJ_{10} | — | November 10, 2013 | Mount Lemmon | Mount Lemmon Survey | · | 3.0 km | MPC · JPL |
| 543261 | 2013 WP_{13} | — | October 22, 2006 | Kitt Peak | Spacewatch | · | 690 m | MPC · JPL |
| 543262 | 2013 WL_{18} | — | June 15, 2005 | Mount Lemmon | Mount Lemmon Survey | V | 660 m | MPC · JPL |
| 543263 | 2013 WA_{26} | — | March 18, 2010 | Mount Lemmon | Mount Lemmon Survey | · | 2.4 km | MPC · JPL |
| 543264 | 2013 WY_{26} | — | October 16, 2007 | Catalina | CSS | · | 3.3 km | MPC · JPL |
| 543265 | 2013 WN_{28} | — | November 2, 2013 | Kitt Peak | Spacewatch | · | 590 m | MPC · JPL |
| 543266 | 2013 WD_{35} | — | November 26, 2013 | Haleakala | Pan-STARRS 1 | · | 2.9 km | MPC · JPL |
| 543267 | 2013 WF_{36} | — | September 13, 2007 | Mount Lemmon | Mount Lemmon Survey | · | 2.8 km | MPC · JPL |
| 543268 | 2013 WS_{40} | — | October 3, 2013 | Mount Lemmon | Mount Lemmon Survey | · | 3.0 km | MPC · JPL |
| 543269 | 2013 WD_{42} | — | November 28, 2013 | Mount Lemmon | Mount Lemmon Survey | HYG | 2.3 km | MPC · JPL |
| 543270 | 2013 WY_{47} | — | December 3, 2008 | Mount Lemmon | Mount Lemmon Survey | · | 3.0 km | MPC · JPL |
| 543271 | 2013 WM_{51} | — | February 20, 2009 | Kitt Peak | Spacewatch | · | 3.2 km | MPC · JPL |
| 543272 | 2013 WD_{52} | — | August 20, 2012 | Charleston | R. Holmes | · | 2.1 km | MPC · JPL |
| 543273 | 2013 WA_{60} | — | November 26, 2013 | Nogales | M. Schwartz, P. R. Holvorcem | EOS | 2.2 km | MPC · JPL |
| 543274 | 2013 WY_{60} | — | November 27, 2013 | Haleakala | Pan-STARRS 1 | · | 1.9 km | MPC · JPL |
| 543275 | 2013 WF_{61} | — | June 1, 2011 | ESA OGS | ESA OGS | · | 4.0 km | MPC · JPL |
| 543276 | 2013 WO_{63} | — | August 15, 2007 | Črni Vrh | Skvarč, J. | · | 3.1 km | MPC · JPL |
| 543277 | 2013 WG_{65} | — | October 14, 2013 | Mount Lemmon | Mount Lemmon Survey | (5) | 860 m | MPC · JPL |
| 543278 | 2013 WH_{65} | — | October 4, 2007 | Catalina | CSS | · | 3.1 km | MPC · JPL |
| 543279 | 2013 WJ_{65} | — | November 6, 2013 | Haleakala | Pan-STARRS 1 | · | 2.2 km | MPC · JPL |
| 543280 | 2013 WP_{68} | — | July 22, 2007 | Lulin | LUSS | · | 2.4 km | MPC · JPL |
| 543281 | 2013 WT_{69} | — | October 8, 2013 | Mount Lemmon | Mount Lemmon Survey | · | 2.7 km | MPC · JPL |
| 543282 | 2013 WA_{72} | — | November 26, 2013 | Mount Lemmon | Mount Lemmon Survey | · | 2.3 km | MPC · JPL |
| 543283 | 2013 WX_{72} | — | March 26, 2009 | Kitt Peak | Spacewatch | · | 1.0 km | MPC · JPL |
| 543284 | 2013 WQ_{73} | — | September 12, 2013 | Mount Lemmon | Mount Lemmon Survey | · | 2.7 km | MPC · JPL |
| 543285 | 2013 WS_{77} | — | November 1, 2013 | Kitt Peak | Spacewatch | EOS | 2.2 km | MPC · JPL |
| 543286 | 2013 WT_{78} | — | October 9, 2013 | Mount Lemmon | Mount Lemmon Survey | TIR | 2.7 km | MPC · JPL |
| 543287 | 2013 WC_{82} | — | November 20, 2008 | Mount Lemmon | Mount Lemmon Survey | · | 2.9 km | MPC · JPL |
| 543288 | 2013 WB_{83} | — | November 27, 2013 | Haleakala | Pan-STARRS 1 | · | 3.0 km | MPC · JPL |
| 543289 | 2013 WQ_{85} | — | November 19, 2003 | Kitt Peak | Spacewatch | · | 860 m | MPC · JPL |
| 543290 | 2013 WE_{88} | — | November 28, 2013 | Kitt Peak | Spacewatch | · | 2.2 km | MPC · JPL |
| 543291 | 2013 WD_{91} | — | November 28, 2013 | Mount Lemmon | Mount Lemmon Survey | · | 2.9 km | MPC · JPL |
| 543292 | 2013 WR_{93} | — | October 9, 2013 | Mount Lemmon | Mount Lemmon Survey | · | 2.1 km | MPC · JPL |
| 543293 | 2013 WD_{96} | — | December 31, 2008 | Mount Lemmon | Mount Lemmon Survey | EOS | 2.0 km | MPC · JPL |
| 543294 | 2013 WB_{97} | — | August 10, 2012 | Kitt Peak | Spacewatch | · | 2.7 km | MPC · JPL |
| 543295 | 2013 WU_{106} | — | October 11, 2007 | Catalina | CSS | · | 2.5 km | MPC · JPL |
| 543296 | 2013 WZ_{109} | — | October 3, 2013 | Kitt Peak | Spacewatch | · | 2.8 km | MPC · JPL |
| 543297 | 2013 WK_{111} | — | January 20, 2009 | Mount Lemmon | Mount Lemmon Survey | · | 2.5 km | MPC · JPL |
| 543298 | 2013 XL_{1} | — | November 1, 2013 | Catalina | CSS | LIX | 2.5 km | MPC · JPL |
| 543299 | 2013 XT_{1} | — | November 7, 2013 | Kitt Peak | Spacewatch | · | 2.2 km | MPC · JPL |
| 543300 | 2013 XJ_{2} | — | November 10, 2013 | Mount Lemmon | Mount Lemmon Survey | · | 1.7 km | MPC · JPL |

== 543301–543400 ==
back to top

| Designation | | | Discovery | | | Properties | | Ref |
| Permanent | Provisional | Named after | Date | Site | Discoverer(s) | Category | Diam. | Ref |
|---|---|---|---|---|---|---|---|---|
| 543301 | 2013 XY_{5} | — | November 11, 2013 | Catalina | CSS | EOS | 2.2 km | MPC · JPL |
| 543302 Hamvasbéla | 2013 XP_{7} | Hamvasbéla | December 4, 2013 | Piszkéstető | K. Sárneczky, P. Székely | · | 3.5 km | MPC · JPL |
| 543303 | 2013 XN_{9} | — | November 27, 2013 | Haleakala | Pan-STARRS 1 | · | 3.6 km | MPC · JPL |
| 543304 | 2013 XD_{12} | — | October 8, 2008 | Mount Lemmon | Mount Lemmon Survey | · | 3.3 km | MPC · JPL |
| 543305 | 2013 XD_{16} | — | November 28, 2013 | Mount Lemmon | Mount Lemmon Survey | · | 2.3 km | MPC · JPL |
| 543306 | 2013 XM_{17} | — | November 5, 2007 | Mount Lemmon | Mount Lemmon Survey | · | 3.3 km | MPC · JPL |
| 543307 | 2013 XX_{23} | — | December 14, 2013 | Haleakala | Pan-STARRS 1 | · | 1.1 km | MPC · JPL |
| 543308 | 2013 XJ_{24} | — | December 10, 2013 | Wildberg | R. Apitzsch | EOS | 1.6 km | MPC · JPL |
| 543309 | 2013 XD_{25} | — | September 11, 2007 | Catalina | CSS | EOS | 2.2 km | MPC · JPL |
| 543310 | 2013 XG_{25} | — | December 14, 2013 | Mount Lemmon | Mount Lemmon Survey | · | 3.7 km | MPC · JPL |
| 543311 | 2013 YT | — | June 3, 2011 | Mount Lemmon | Mount Lemmon Survey | EOS | 2.0 km | MPC · JPL |
| 543312 | 2013 YY | — | October 9, 2007 | Kitt Peak | Spacewatch | VER | 2.5 km | MPC · JPL |
| 543313 | 2013 YP_{3} | — | October 10, 2002 | Palomar | NEAT | · | 2.2 km | MPC · JPL |
| 543314 | 2013 YU_{12} | — | November 28, 2013 | Mount Lemmon | Mount Lemmon Survey | · | 2.6 km | MPC · JPL |
| 543315 Asmakhammari | 2013 YY_{14} | Asmakhammari | December 24, 2013 | Oukaïmeden | M. Ory | · | 3.5 km | MPC · JPL |
| 543316 | 2013 YB_{20} | — | November 6, 2013 | Mount Lemmon | Mount Lemmon Survey | · | 1.4 km | MPC · JPL |
| 543317 | 2013 YK_{25} | — | November 30, 2003 | Kitt Peak | Spacewatch | · | 650 m | MPC · JPL |
| 543318 | 2013 YO_{36} | — | March 12, 2010 | Mount Lemmon | Mount Lemmon Survey | EOS | 1.8 km | MPC · JPL |
| 543319 | 2013 YE_{38} | — | December 28, 2013 | Catalina | CSS | APO | 320 m | MPC · JPL |
| 543320 | 2013 YT_{44} | — | May 23, 2004 | Kitt Peak | Spacewatch | · | 4.3 km | MPC · JPL |
| 543321 | 2013 YG_{45} | — | September 28, 2009 | Mount Lemmon | Mount Lemmon Survey | V | 770 m | MPC · JPL |
| 543322 | 2013 YU_{46} | — | November 26, 2013 | Mount Lemmon | Mount Lemmon Survey | · | 2.6 km | MPC · JPL |
| 543323 | 2013 YC_{89} | — | September 29, 2000 | Kitt Peak | Spacewatch | · | 4.1 km | MPC · JPL |
| 543324 | 2013 YT_{90} | — | December 28, 2013 | Kitt Peak | Spacewatch | · | 3.4 km | MPC · JPL |
| 543325 | 2013 YU_{106} | — | July 25, 2003 | Palomar | NEAT | · | 930 m | MPC · JPL |
| 543326 | 2013 YL_{107} | — | February 12, 2009 | Calar Alto | F. Hormuth, Datson, J. C. | · | 2.5 km | MPC · JPL |
| 543327 | 2013 YV_{111} | — | December 30, 2013 | Kitt Peak | Spacewatch | · | 2.4 km | MPC · JPL |
| 543328 | 2013 YV_{115} | — | March 17, 2009 | Palomar | Palomar Transient Factory | · | 3.2 km | MPC · JPL |
| 543329 | 2013 YN_{117} | — | December 17, 2009 | Kitt Peak | Spacewatch | · | 860 m | MPC · JPL |
| 543330 | 2013 YD_{120} | — | June 26, 2011 | Mount Lemmon | Mount Lemmon Survey | · | 3.3 km | MPC · JPL |
| 543331 | 2013 YV_{141} | — | November 4, 2002 | Kitt Peak | Spacewatch | · | 3.6 km | MPC · JPL |
| 543332 | 2013 YY_{143} | — | October 18, 2006 | Kitt Peak | Spacewatch | · | 3.8 km | MPC · JPL |
| 543333 | 2013 YN_{149} | — | October 10, 2007 | Catalina | CSS | · | 4.1 km | MPC · JPL |
| 543334 | 2013 YC_{151} | — | December 4, 2013 | Haleakala | Pan-STARRS 1 | · | 2.2 km | MPC · JPL |
| 543335 | 2014 AX_{2} | — | January 1, 2014 | Haleakala | Pan-STARRS 1 | · | 2.2 km | MPC · JPL |
| 543336 | 2014 AA_{7} | — | September 19, 2006 | Kitt Peak | Spacewatch | · | 2.3 km | MPC · JPL |
| 543337 | 2014 AJ_{9} | — | February 18, 2004 | La Silla | Barbieri, C. | EOS | 2.1 km | MPC · JPL |
| 543338 | 2014 AD_{11} | — | January 1, 2014 | Mount Lemmon | Mount Lemmon Survey | · | 3.0 km | MPC · JPL |
| 543339 | 2014 AX_{12} | — | July 21, 2001 | Palomar | NEAT | · | 3.9 km | MPC · JPL |
| 543340 | 2014 AT_{13} | — | January 1, 2014 | Mount Lemmon | Mount Lemmon Survey | · | 2.6 km | MPC · JPL |
| 543341 | 2014 AT_{18} | — | April 19, 2010 | Bergisch Gladbach | W. Bickel | · | 2.7 km | MPC · JPL |
| 543342 | 2014 AM_{20} | — | March 25, 2007 | Mount Lemmon | Mount Lemmon Survey | · | 2.2 km | MPC · JPL |
| 543343 | 2014 AH_{22} | — | January 15, 2009 | Kitt Peak | Spacewatch | · | 2.7 km | MPC · JPL |
| 543344 | 2014 AO_{24} | — | December 30, 2013 | Kitt Peak | Spacewatch | · | 2.9 km | MPC · JPL |
| 543345 | 2014 AO_{29} | — | November 4, 2007 | Kitt Peak | Spacewatch | EOS | 2.3 km | MPC · JPL |
| 543346 | 2014 AH_{36} | — | December 1, 2008 | Kitt Peak | Spacewatch | · | 1.4 km | MPC · JPL |
| 543347 | 2014 AS_{36} | — | December 24, 2013 | Mount Lemmon | Mount Lemmon Survey | TIR | 3.0 km | MPC · JPL |
| 543348 | 2014 AM_{41} | — | January 3, 2008 | Catalina | CSS | · | 3.4 km | MPC · JPL |
| 543349 | 2014 AN_{44} | — | January 20, 2009 | Mount Lemmon | Mount Lemmon Survey | · | 2.1 km | MPC · JPL |
| 543350 | 2014 AW_{45} | — | July 30, 2000 | Cerro Tololo | Deep Ecliptic Survey | · | 2.6 km | MPC · JPL |
| 543351 | 2014 AD_{48} | — | December 30, 2013 | Kitt Peak | Spacewatch | · | 2.4 km | MPC · JPL |
| 543352 | 2014 AD_{49} | — | December 27, 2013 | Kitt Peak | Spacewatch | · | 2.7 km | MPC · JPL |
| 543353 | 2014 AS_{53} | — | February 1, 2003 | Palomar | NEAT | · | 3.4 km | MPC · JPL |
| 543354 | 2014 AN_{55} | — | January 5, 2014 | Haleakala | Pan-STARRS 1 | SDO | 507 km | MPC · JPL |
| 543355 | 2014 AC_{65} | — | January 7, 2014 | Mount Lemmon | Mount Lemmon Survey | · | 3.5 km | MPC · JPL |
| 543356 | 2014 BM_{3} | — | November 7, 2007 | Catalina | CSS | T_{j} (2.97) | 3.5 km | MPC · JPL |
| 543357 | 2014 BE_{5} | — | March 5, 2008 | Mount Lemmon | Mount Lemmon Survey | · | 860 m | MPC · JPL |
| 543358 | 2014 BV_{5} | — | February 28, 2003 | Haleakala | NEAT | · | 3.6 km | MPC · JPL |
| 543359 | 2014 BJ_{9} | — | January 21, 2014 | Haleakala | Pan-STARRS 1 | H | 480 m | MPC · JPL |
| 543360 | 2014 BV_{11} | — | January 21, 2014 | Mount Lemmon | Mount Lemmon Survey | · | 3.0 km | MPC · JPL |
| 543361 | 2014 BN_{23} | — | December 30, 2013 | Mount Lemmon | Mount Lemmon Survey | EOS | 1.9 km | MPC · JPL |
| 543362 | 2014 BP_{29} | — | December 7, 2002 | Kitt Peak | Spacewatch | · | 2.8 km | MPC · JPL |
| 543363 | 2014 BK_{30} | — | December 18, 2007 | Mount Lemmon | Mount Lemmon Survey | · | 2.9 km | MPC · JPL |
| 543364 | 2014 BX_{30} | — | July 31, 2005 | Bergisch Gladbach | W. Bickel | TIR | 3.7 km | MPC · JPL |
| 543365 | 2014 BG_{35} | — | February 3, 2009 | Mount Lemmon | Mount Lemmon Survey | EOS | 2.0 km | MPC · JPL |
| 543366 | 2014 BP_{38} | — | January 23, 2014 | Mount Lemmon | Mount Lemmon Survey | · | 3.2 km | MPC · JPL |
| 543367 | 2014 BF_{40} | — | November 16, 2007 | Charleston | R. Holmes | EOS | 2.4 km | MPC · JPL |
| 543368 | 2014 BA_{46} | — | July 31, 2000 | Cerro Tololo | Deep Ecliptic Survey | · | 2.9 km | MPC · JPL |
| 543369 | 2014 BK_{49} | — | November 26, 2013 | Mount Lemmon | Mount Lemmon Survey | · | 2.7 km | MPC · JPL |
| 543370 | 2014 BW_{49} | — | October 12, 2007 | Goodricke-Pigott | R. A. Tucker | · | 2.3 km | MPC · JPL |
| 543371 | 2014 BZ_{50} | — | January 25, 2003 | Pla D'Arguines | R. Ferrando | · | 3.3 km | MPC · JPL |
| 543372 | 2014 BO_{52} | — | December 15, 2007 | Mount Lemmon | Mount Lemmon Survey | · | 2.3 km | MPC · JPL |
| 543373 | 2014 BJ_{56} | — | November 1, 2013 | Mount Lemmon | Mount Lemmon Survey | EUP | 3.0 km | MPC · JPL |
| 543374 | 2014 BZ_{58} | — | August 29, 2009 | Kitt Peak | Spacewatch | · | 610 m | MPC · JPL |
| 543375 | 2014 BX_{64} | — | January 24, 2014 | Haleakala | Pan-STARRS 1 | cubewano (hot) | 330 km | MPC · JPL |
| 543376 | 2014 BE_{70} | — | January 21, 2014 | Haleakala | Pan-STARRS 1 | SDO | 243 km | MPC · JPL |
| 543377 | 2014 BF_{70} | — | January 25, 2014 | Haleakala | Pan-STARRS 1 | centaur | 70 km | MPC · JPL |
| 543378 | 2014 BS_{70} | — | March 18, 2015 | Haleakala | Pan-STARRS 1 | · | 2.4 km | MPC · JPL |
| 543379 | 2014 BR_{71} | — | January 26, 2015 | Haleakala | Pan-STARRS 1 | · | 2.7 km | MPC · JPL |
| 543380 | 2014 BQ_{73} | — | January 28, 2014 | Kitt Peak | Spacewatch | · | 2.5 km | MPC · JPL |
| 543381 | 2014 CS_{11} | — | August 4, 2005 | Palomar | NEAT | · | 3.9 km | MPC · JPL |
| 543382 | 2014 CB_{17} | — | March 26, 2003 | Kitt Peak | Spacewatch | · | 3.0 km | MPC · JPL |
| 543383 | 2014 CL_{25} | — | February 12, 2008 | Mount Lemmon | Mount Lemmon Survey | · | 3.6 km | MPC · JPL |
| 543384 | 2014 DY_{4} | — | January 25, 2014 | Haleakala | Pan-STARRS 1 | · | 2.8 km | MPC · JPL |
| 543385 | 2014 DO_{6} | — | February 8, 2014 | Mount Lemmon | Mount Lemmon Survey | · | 1.4 km | MPC · JPL |
| 543386 | 2014 DD_{8} | — | February 8, 2014 | Mount Lemmon | Mount Lemmon Survey | · | 3.0 km | MPC · JPL |
| 543387 | 2014 DM_{13} | — | February 20, 2014 | Haleakala | Pan-STARRS 1 | VER | 2.3 km | MPC · JPL |
| 543388 | 2014 DM_{15} | — | October 6, 2005 | Mount Lemmon | Mount Lemmon Survey | · | 3.3 km | MPC · JPL |
| 543389 | 2014 DT_{25} | — | February 20, 2014 | Kitt Peak | Spacewatch | · | 3.4 km | MPC · JPL |
| 543390 | 2014 DT_{27} | — | October 21, 2006 | Kitt Peak | Spacewatch | · | 2.4 km | MPC · JPL |
| 543391 | 2014 DE_{30} | — | December 19, 2007 | Mount Lemmon | Mount Lemmon Survey | VER | 2.1 km | MPC · JPL |
| 543392 | 2014 DT_{32} | — | February 21, 2014 | Kitt Peak | Spacewatch | · | 1 km | MPC · JPL |
| 543393 | 2014 DL_{38} | — | November 17, 2009 | Kitt Peak | Spacewatch | · | 710 m | MPC · JPL |
| 543394 | 2014 DX_{47} | — | February 14, 2010 | Kitt Peak | Spacewatch | · | 1.7 km | MPC · JPL |
| 543395 | 2014 DG_{49} | — | February 1, 2003 | Kitt Peak | Spacewatch | EOS | 2.5 km | MPC · JPL |
| 543396 | 2014 DA_{56} | — | September 17, 2009 | Mount Lemmon | Mount Lemmon Survey | L4 | 8.1 km | MPC · JPL |
| 543397 | 2014 DQ_{60} | — | April 24, 2003 | Kitt Peak | Spacewatch | L4 | 8.3 km | MPC · JPL |
| 543398 | 2014 DD_{72} | — | July 30, 2008 | Mount Lemmon | Mount Lemmon Survey | · | 740 m | MPC · JPL |
| 543399 | 2014 DG_{77} | — | February 26, 2014 | Haleakala | Pan-STARRS 1 | · | 610 m | MPC · JPL |
| 543400 | 2014 DV_{80} | — | February 21, 2014 | Haleakala | Pan-STARRS 1 | · | 2.6 km | MPC · JPL |

== 543401–543500 ==
back to top

| Designation | | | Discovery | | | Properties | | Ref |
| Permanent | Provisional | Named after | Date | Site | Discoverer(s) | Category | Diam. | Ref |
|---|---|---|---|---|---|---|---|---|
| 543401 | 2014 DF_{97} | — | October 18, 2009 | Mount Lemmon | Mount Lemmon Survey | · | 500 m | MPC · JPL |
| 543402 | 2014 DF_{100} | — | June 17, 2005 | Mount Lemmon | Mount Lemmon Survey | · | 850 m | MPC · JPL |
| 543403 | 2014 DB_{102} | — | February 27, 2014 | Mount Lemmon | Mount Lemmon Survey | · | 2.6 km | MPC · JPL |
| 543404 | 2014 DO_{117} | — | November 23, 2006 | Kitt Peak | Spacewatch | HYG | 2.7 km | MPC · JPL |
| 543405 | 2014 DG_{122} | — | February 28, 2014 | Haleakala | Pan-STARRS 1 | · | 1.3 km | MPC · JPL |
| 543406 | 2014 DN_{126} | — | December 18, 2012 | Mount Lemmon | Kürti, S. | EOS | 2.2 km | MPC · JPL |
| 543407 | 2014 DJ_{131} | — | April 11, 2002 | Palomar | NEAT | · | 4.7 km | MPC · JPL |
| 543408 | 2014 DU_{134} | — | October 24, 2011 | Haleakala | Pan-STARRS 1 | (260) | 2.9 km | MPC · JPL |
| 543409 | 2014 DS_{142} | — | November 16, 2006 | Mount Lemmon | Mount Lemmon Survey | EOS | 2.8 km | MPC · JPL |
| 543410 | 2014 ES_{1} | — | February 11, 2014 | Mount Lemmon | Mount Lemmon Survey | · | 750 m | MPC · JPL |
| 543411 | 2014 EA_{13} | — | September 23, 2009 | Mount Lemmon | Mount Lemmon Survey | · | 680 m | MPC · JPL |
| 543412 | 2014 EJ_{33} | — | October 15, 2001 | Palomar | NEAT | V | 660 m | MPC · JPL |
| 543413 | 2014 EO_{44} | — | August 4, 2005 | Palomar | NEAT | · | 3.0 km | MPC · JPL |
| 543414 | 2014 EH_{73} | — | November 1, 2006 | Mount Lemmon | Mount Lemmon Survey | · | 5.5 km | MPC · JPL |
| 543415 | 2014 EQ_{74} | — | January 17, 2013 | Haleakala | Pan-STARRS 1 | T_{j} (2.98) · 3:2 | 4.6 km | MPC · JPL |
| 543416 | 2014 EF_{85} | — | February 28, 2014 | Haleakala | Pan-STARRS 1 | · | 750 m | MPC · JPL |
| 543417 | 2014 EL_{111} | — | January 13, 2008 | Kitt Peak | Spacewatch | EOS | 1.8 km | MPC · JPL |
| 543418 | 2014 EZ_{116} | — | January 2, 2000 | Kitt Peak | Spacewatch | · | 660 m | MPC · JPL |
| 543419 | 2014 EU_{145} | — | February 28, 2014 | Haleakala | Pan-STARRS 1 | · | 2.4 km | MPC · JPL |
| 543420 | 2014 EE_{184} | — | November 11, 2004 | Kitt Peak | Spacewatch | · | 1.7 km | MPC · JPL |
| 543421 | 2014 EP_{210} | — | October 29, 2005 | Mount Lemmon | Mount Lemmon Survey | ELF | 3.5 km | MPC · JPL |
| 543422 | 2014 EX_{249} | — | March 7, 2014 | Mount Lemmon | Mount Lemmon Survey | · | 2.8 km | MPC · JPL |
| 543423 | 2014 FV_{10} | — | November 20, 2005 | Catalina | CSS | · | 1.0 km | MPC · JPL |
| 543424 | 2014 FG_{42} | — | March 28, 2014 | Mount Lemmon | Mount Lemmon Survey | · | 2.7 km | MPC · JPL |
| 543425 | 2014 FO_{45} | — | February 28, 2014 | Mount Lemmon | Mount Lemmon Survey | · | 740 m | MPC · JPL |
| 543426 | 2014 FP_{68} | — | March 28, 2009 | Mount Lemmon | Mount Lemmon Survey | · | 2.3 km | MPC · JPL |
| 543427 | 2014 GB_{11} | — | February 26, 2014 | Haleakala | Pan-STARRS 1 | V | 590 m | MPC · JPL |
| 543428 | 2014 GB_{24} | — | April 4, 2014 | Mount Lemmon | Mount Lemmon Survey | · | 650 m | MPC · JPL |
| 543429 | 2014 GZ_{31} | — | July 29, 2008 | Kitt Peak | Spacewatch | · | 600 m | MPC · JPL |
| 543430 | 2014 GA_{33} | — | June 14, 2006 | Siding Spring | SSS | · | 1.6 km | MPC · JPL |
| 543431 | 2014 GR_{39} | — | December 6, 2008 | Kitt Peak | Spacewatch | · | 1.3 km | MPC · JPL |
| 543432 | 2014 GL_{43} | — | March 25, 2007 | Mount Lemmon | Mount Lemmon Survey | · | 670 m | MPC · JPL |
| 543433 | 2014 GY_{43} | — | May 23, 2011 | Nogales | M. Schwartz, P. R. Holvorcem | · | 790 m | MPC · JPL |
| 543434 | 2014 GB_{52} | — | April 9, 2014 | Haleakala | Pan-STARRS 1 | · | 1.6 km | MPC · JPL |
| 543435 | 2014 GC_{54} | — | April 4, 2014 | Haleakala | Pan-STARRS 1 | plutino | 196 km | MPC · JPL |
| 543436 | 2014 GW_{62} | — | October 21, 2008 | Kitt Peak | Spacewatch | · | 1.2 km | MPC · JPL |
| 543437 | 2014 GC_{66} | — | April 1, 2014 | Kitt Peak | Spacewatch | · | 570 m | MPC · JPL |
| 543438 | 2014 HB | — | April 20, 2014 | Mount Lemmon | Mount Lemmon Survey | · | 820 m | MPC · JPL |
| 543439 | 2014 HP | — | March 14, 2004 | Kitt Peak | Spacewatch | · | 900 m | MPC · JPL |
| 543440 | 2014 HE_{2} | — | October 7, 2008 | Kitt Peak | Spacewatch | · | 620 m | MPC · JPL |
| 543441 | 2014 HD_{32} | — | April 1, 2014 | Kitt Peak | Spacewatch | · | 1.6 km | MPC · JPL |
| 543442 | 2014 HV_{124} | — | April 25, 2007 | Kitt Peak | Spacewatch | · | 1.4 km | MPC · JPL |
| 543443 | 2014 HU_{131} | — | February 15, 2013 | Haleakala | Pan-STARRS 1 | 3:2 | 4.5 km | MPC · JPL |
| 543444 | 2014 HP_{152} | — | August 25, 2005 | Palomar | NEAT | · | 960 m | MPC · JPL |
| 543445 | 2014 HM_{162} | — | November 26, 2012 | Mount Lemmon | Mount Lemmon Survey | · | 570 m | MPC · JPL |
| 543446 | 2014 HJ_{163} | — | September 22, 2011 | Kitt Peak | Spacewatch | · | 1.0 km | MPC · JPL |
| 543447 | 2014 HJ_{166} | — | October 16, 2006 | Catalina | CSS | · | 3.3 km | MPC · JPL |
| 543448 | 2014 HH_{172} | — | August 7, 2008 | Kitt Peak | Spacewatch | · | 620 m | MPC · JPL |
| 543449 | 2014 HC_{173} | — | April 29, 2014 | Haleakala | Pan-STARRS 1 | · | 530 m | MPC · JPL |
| 543450 | 2014 HS_{173} | — | April 29, 2014 | Haleakala | Pan-STARRS 1 | · | 1.3 km | MPC · JPL |
| 543451 | 2014 HS_{179} | — | April 5, 2014 | Haleakala | Pan-STARRS 1 | · | 680 m | MPC · JPL |
| 543452 | 2014 HN_{189} | — | April 30, 2014 | Haleakala | Pan-STARRS 1 | · | 800 m | MPC · JPL |
| 543453 | 2014 HX_{190} | — | July 29, 2008 | Kitt Peak | Spacewatch | 3:2 · (6124) | 4.6 km | MPC · JPL |
| 543454 | 2014 HZ_{199} | — | April 11, 2002 | Palomar | NEAT | cubewano (hot) | 170 km | MPC · JPL |
| 543455 | 2014 HU_{202} | — | April 30, 2014 | Haleakala | Pan-STARRS 1 | · | 1.1 km | MPC · JPL |
| 543456 | 2014 HK_{211} | — | October 9, 2008 | Catalina | CSS | · | 1.4 km | MPC · JPL |
| 543457 | 2014 JZ | — | May 1, 2014 | ESA OGS | ESA OGS | · | 580 m | MPC · JPL |
| 543458 | 2014 JB_{3} | — | April 24, 2014 | Haleakala | Pan-STARRS 1 | · | 580 m | MPC · JPL |
| 543459 | 2014 JH_{3} | — | May 1, 2014 | Mount Lemmon | Mount Lemmon Survey | · | 680 m | MPC · JPL |
| 543460 | 2014 JN_{18} | — | June 2, 2003 | Kitt Peak | Spacewatch | · | 2.7 km | MPC · JPL |
| 543461 | 2014 JG_{29} | — | September 4, 2002 | Anderson Mesa | LONEOS | · | 1.4 km | MPC · JPL |
| 543462 | 2014 JZ_{43} | — | September 23, 2011 | Haleakala | Pan-STARRS 1 | · | 1.1 km | MPC · JPL |
| 543463 | 2014 JT_{48} | — | May 20, 2006 | Siding Spring | SSS | · | 1.5 km | MPC · JPL |
| 543464 | 2014 JK_{59} | — | January 17, 2013 | Haleakala | Pan-STARRS 1 | · | 1.1 km | MPC · JPL |
| 543465 | 2014 JG_{65} | — | October 26, 2011 | Haleakala | Pan-STARRS 1 | · | 1.4 km | MPC · JPL |
| 543466 | 2014 JT_{65} | — | May 8, 2014 | Haleakala | Pan-STARRS 1 | · | 520 m | MPC · JPL |
| 543467 | 2014 JJ_{68} | — | December 4, 2012 | Mount Lemmon | Mount Lemmon Survey | · | 640 m | MPC · JPL |
| 543468 | 2014 JX_{70} | — | March 26, 2007 | Kitt Peak | Spacewatch | · | 610 m | MPC · JPL |
| 543469 | 2014 JC_{91} | — | May 9, 2014 | Haleakala | Pan-STARRS 1 | · | 1.3 km | MPC · JPL |
| 543470 | 2014 JN_{93} | — | July 26, 2006 | Siding Spring | SSS | · | 1.5 km | MPC · JPL |
| 543471 | 2014 JU_{99} | — | May 8, 2014 | Haleakala | Pan-STARRS 1 | · | 1.2 km | MPC · JPL |
| 543472 | 2014 KA_{8} | — | October 15, 2001 | Kitt Peak | Spacewatch | · | 570 m | MPC · JPL |
| 543473 | 2014 KS_{19} | — | May 4, 2014 | Haleakala | Pan-STARRS 1 | · | 690 m | MPC · JPL |
| 543474 | 2014 KB_{21} | — | April 5, 2014 | Haleakala | Pan-STARRS 1 | · | 1.4 km | MPC · JPL |
| 543475 | 2014 KU_{29} | — | December 21, 2012 | Mount Lemmon | Mount Lemmon Survey | · | 570 m | MPC · JPL |
| 543476 | 2014 KR_{32} | — | August 16, 2006 | Siding Spring | SSS | · | 1.7 km | MPC · JPL |
| 543477 | 2014 KP_{33} | — | October 10, 2004 | Palomar | NEAT | · | 1.3 km | MPC · JPL |
| 543478 | 2014 KW_{44} | — | June 20, 2002 | Palomar | NEAT | · | 1.8 km | MPC · JPL |
| 543479 | 2014 KN_{48} | — | May 23, 2006 | Mount Lemmon | Mount Lemmon Survey | 3:2 | 5.5 km | MPC · JPL |
| 543480 | 2014 KB_{49} | — | October 16, 2002 | Palomar | NEAT | · | 620 m | MPC · JPL |
| 543481 | 2014 KQ_{49} | — | July 17, 2004 | Cerro Tololo | Deep Ecliptic Survey | · | 760 m | MPC · JPL |
| 543482 | 2014 KE_{59} | — | May 25, 2003 | Kitt Peak | Spacewatch | · | 920 m | MPC · JPL |
| 543483 | 2014 KJ_{61} | — | January 30, 2009 | Mount Lemmon | Mount Lemmon Survey | EUN | 1.3 km | MPC · JPL |
| 543484 | 2014 KQ_{70} | — | May 7, 2014 | Haleakala | Pan-STARRS 1 | · | 590 m | MPC · JPL |
| 543485 | 2014 KD_{71} | — | September 27, 2008 | Mount Lemmon | Mount Lemmon Survey | · | 890 m | MPC · JPL |
| 543486 | 2014 KQ_{71} | — | February 18, 2010 | Kitt Peak | Spacewatch | · | 740 m | MPC · JPL |
| 543487 | 2014 KX_{72} | — | May 7, 2014 | Haleakala | Pan-STARRS 1 | (2076) | 650 m | MPC · JPL |
| 543488 | 2014 KC_{86} | — | May 24, 2014 | Haleakala | Pan-STARRS 1 | · | 2.7 km | MPC · JPL |
| 543489 | 2014 KM_{86} | — | May 21, 2014 | Haleakala | Pan-STARRS 1 | · | 610 m | MPC · JPL |
| 543490 | 2014 KV_{95} | — | November 1, 2005 | Mount Lemmon | Mount Lemmon Survey | · | 670 m | MPC · JPL |
| 543491 | 2014 KV_{104} | — | September 26, 2006 | Catalina | CSS | · | 1.6 km | MPC · JPL |
| 543492 | 2014 KV_{110} | — | May 24, 2014 | Haleakala | Pan-STARRS 1 | · | 490 m | MPC · JPL |
| 543493 | 2014 LK_{10} | — | December 4, 2008 | Mount Lemmon | Mount Lemmon Survey | · | 1.6 km | MPC · JPL |
| 543494 | 2014 LL_{11} | — | November 21, 2008 | Kitt Peak | Spacewatch | · | 790 m | MPC · JPL |
| 543495 | 2014 LQ_{13} | — | July 25, 2003 | Palomar | NEAT | MAS | 700 m | MPC · JPL |
| 543496 | 2014 LE_{15} | — | November 20, 2003 | Kitt Peak | Deep Ecliptic Survey | NYS | 1.4 km | MPC · JPL |
| 543497 | 2014 LN_{16} | — | June 4, 2014 | Mount Lemmon | Mount Lemmon Survey | EUN | 1.2 km | MPC · JPL |
| 543498 | 2014 LU_{16} | — | May 7, 2014 | Haleakala | Pan-STARRS 1 | · | 730 m | MPC · JPL |
| 543499 | 2014 LY_{18} | — | November 22, 2012 | Kitt Peak | Spacewatch | · | 710 m | MPC · JPL |
| 543500 | 2014 LD_{20} | — | June 5, 2014 | Haleakala | Pan-STARRS 1 | · | 1.2 km | MPC · JPL |

== 543501–543600 ==
back to top

| Designation | | | Discovery | | | Properties | | Ref |
| Permanent | Provisional | Named after | Date | Site | Discoverer(s) | Category | Diam. | Ref |
|---|---|---|---|---|---|---|---|---|
| 543501 | 2014 LY_{25} | — | April 10, 2014 | Haleakala | Pan-STARRS 1 | H | 510 m | MPC · JPL |
| 543502 | 2014 LU_{26} | — | July 7, 2007 | Lulin | LUSS | PHO | 1.2 km | MPC · JPL |
| 543503 | 2014 LJ_{28} | — | November 1, 2006 | Mount Lemmon | Mount Lemmon Survey | JUN | 1.2 km | MPC · JPL |
| 543504 | 2014 LJ_{29} | — | November 4, 2007 | Mount Lemmon | Mount Lemmon Survey | · | 1.8 km | MPC · JPL |
| 543505 | 2014 LO_{29} | — | October 16, 2006 | Catalina | CSS | · | 1.5 km | MPC · JPL |
| 543506 | 2014 LP_{29} | — | June 9, 2014 | Mount Lemmon | Mount Lemmon Survey | · | 1.8 km | MPC · JPL |
| 543507 | 2014 LU_{31} | — | June 3, 2014 | Haleakala | Pan-STARRS 1 | EUN | 1.1 km | MPC · JPL |
| 543508 | 2014 MG_{1} | — | April 29, 2014 | Haleakala | Pan-STARRS 1 | · | 630 m | MPC · JPL |
| 543509 | 2014 MH_{2} | — | July 23, 2003 | Palomar | NEAT | · | 1.7 km | MPC · JPL |
| 543510 | 2014 MQ_{6} | — | November 7, 2008 | Mount Lemmon | Mount Lemmon Survey | · | 1.4 km | MPC · JPL |
| 543511 | 2014 MY_{7} | — | March 23, 2003 | Kitt Peak | Spacewatch | · | 740 m | MPC · JPL |
| 543512 | 2014 MU_{9} | — | May 28, 2014 | Haleakala | Pan-STARRS 1 | · | 1.0 km | MPC · JPL |
| 543513 | 2014 MA_{11} | — | June 21, 2014 | Mount Lemmon | Mount Lemmon Survey | · | 1.3 km | MPC · JPL |
| 543514 | 2014 MW_{11} | — | September 22, 2006 | Anderson Mesa | LONEOS | · | 1.4 km | MPC · JPL |
| 543515 | 2014 MF_{12} | — | May 21, 2014 | Haleakala | Pan-STARRS 1 | · | 890 m | MPC · JPL |
| 543516 | 2014 MF_{13} | — | March 18, 2010 | Mount Lemmon | Mount Lemmon Survey | · | 740 m | MPC · JPL |
| 543517 | 2014 MQ_{13} | — | August 10, 2001 | Palomar | NEAT | · | 1.7 km | MPC · JPL |
| 543518 | 2014 MG_{18} | — | May 4, 2014 | Haleakala | Pan-STARRS 1 | · | 1.3 km | MPC · JPL |
| 543519 | 2014 ME_{20} | — | June 21, 2014 | Haleakala | Pan-STARRS 1 | · | 1.1 km | MPC · JPL |
| 543520 | 2014 MW_{21} | — | May 17, 2007 | Kitt Peak | Spacewatch | · | 560 m | MPC · JPL |
| 543521 | 2014 MD_{22} | — | January 30, 2004 | Kitt Peak | Spacewatch | · | 1.6 km | MPC · JPL |
| 543522 | 2014 MT_{25} | — | June 4, 2014 | Haleakala | Pan-STARRS 1 | V | 630 m | MPC · JPL |
| 543523 | 2014 MD_{27} | — | June 28, 2014 | Catalina | CSS | · | 460 m | MPC · JPL |
| 543524 | 2014 MM_{30} | — | February 14, 2013 | Haleakala | Pan-STARRS 1 | · | 1.4 km | MPC · JPL |
| 543525 | 2014 MW_{31} | — | January 31, 2006 | Kitt Peak | Spacewatch | · | 670 m | MPC · JPL |
| 543526 | 2014 MU_{35} | — | March 14, 2010 | Mount Lemmon | Mount Lemmon Survey | · | 670 m | MPC · JPL |
| 543527 | 2014 MR_{38} | — | September 13, 2007 | Kitt Peak | Spacewatch | · | 920 m | MPC · JPL |
| 543528 | 2014 MX_{38} | — | May 26, 2001 | Kitt Peak | Spacewatch | EUN | 1.3 km | MPC · JPL |
| 543529 | 2014 MP_{42} | — | November 11, 2007 | Mount Lemmon | Mount Lemmon Survey | PHO | 720 m | MPC · JPL |
| 543530 | 2014 MS_{43} | — | October 20, 2007 | Mount Lemmon | Mount Lemmon Survey | · | 1.1 km | MPC · JPL |
| 543531 | 2014 MZ_{43} | — | May 27, 2014 | Haleakala | Pan-STARRS 1 | · | 1.1 km | MPC · JPL |
| 543532 | 2014 MP_{47} | — | November 6, 2012 | Kitt Peak | Spacewatch | · | 620 m | MPC · JPL |
| 543533 | 2014 MS_{49} | — | October 10, 2007 | Kitt Peak | Spacewatch | NYS | 1.1 km | MPC · JPL |
| 543534 | 2014 MV_{50} | — | November 19, 1995 | Kitt Peak | Spacewatch | · | 1.2 km | MPC · JPL |
| 543535 | 2014 MS_{52} | — | April 7, 2013 | Mount Lemmon | Mount Lemmon Survey | PHO | 740 m | MPC · JPL |
| 543536 | 2014 MY_{64} | — | August 30, 2011 | Haleakala | Pan-STARRS 1 | V | 510 m | MPC · JPL |
| 543537 | 2014 MC_{66} | — | May 6, 2014 | Haleakala | Pan-STARRS 1 | BAP | 670 m | MPC · JPL |
| 543538 | 2014 MP_{66} | — | October 11, 2010 | Mount Lemmon | Mount Lemmon Survey | · | 1.6 km | MPC · JPL |
| 543539 | 2014 MT_{66} | — | October 7, 2010 | Catalina | CSS | · | 1.5 km | MPC · JPL |
| 543540 | 2014 MN_{69} | — | May 7, 2014 | Haleakala | Pan-STARRS 1 | · | 2.0 km | MPC · JPL |
| 543541 | 2014 MA_{72} | — | October 19, 2006 | Catalina | CSS | EUN | 1.3 km | MPC · JPL |
| 543542 | 2014 MG_{73} | — | June 15, 2009 | Mount Lemmon | Mount Lemmon Survey | 615 | 1.3 km | MPC · JPL |
| 543543 | 2014 MP_{73} | — | May 17, 2009 | Mount Lemmon | Mount Lemmon Survey | · | 1.7 km | MPC · JPL |
| 543544 | 2014 MQ_{73} | — | February 9, 2013 | Haleakala | Pan-STARRS 1 | · | 1.3 km | MPC · JPL |
| 543545 | 2014 MS_{73} | — | December 31, 2008 | Kitt Peak | Spacewatch | V | 590 m | MPC · JPL |
| 543546 | 2014 MU_{74} | — | January 1, 2012 | Mount Lemmon | Mount Lemmon Survey | · | 1.9 km | MPC · JPL |
| 543547 | 2014 MW_{76} | — | June 28, 2014 | Haleakala | Pan-STARRS 1 | · | 1.6 km | MPC · JPL |
| 543548 | 2014 MO_{77} | — | November 15, 2010 | Mount Lemmon | Mount Lemmon Survey | · | 1.3 km | MPC · JPL |
| 543549 | 2014 MF_{78} | — | June 30, 2014 | Haleakala | Pan-STARRS 1 | · | 2.0 km | MPC · JPL |
| 543550 | 2014 MS_{78} | — | August 21, 2001 | Palomar | NEAT | (194) | 1.6 km | MPC · JPL |
| 543551 | 2014 MP_{82} | — | September 9, 2015 | Haleakala | Pan-STARRS 1 | · | 1.1 km | MPC · JPL |
| 543552 | 2014 NJ | — | September 28, 2006 | Mount Lemmon | Mount Lemmon Survey | JUN | 970 m | MPC · JPL |
| 543553 | 2014 ND_{2} | — | July 1, 2014 | Haleakala | Pan-STARRS 1 | · | 2.0 km | MPC · JPL |
| 543554 | 2014 NT_{2} | — | May 5, 2014 | Mount Lemmon | Mount Lemmon Survey | · | 1.5 km | MPC · JPL |
| 543555 | 2014 NF_{4} | — | July 1, 2014 | Haleakala | Pan-STARRS 1 | · | 610 m | MPC · JPL |
| 543556 | 2014 NL_{4} | — | January 27, 2012 | Mount Lemmon | Mount Lemmon Survey | (5) | 790 m | MPC · JPL |
| 543557 | 2014 NG_{8} | — | February 15, 2010 | Kitt Peak | Spacewatch | · | 760 m | MPC · JPL |
| 543558 | 2014 NB_{11} | — | June 7, 2000 | Kitt Peak | Spacewatch | · | 570 m | MPC · JPL |
| 543559 | 2014 NL_{13} | — | September 26, 2011 | Haleakala | Pan-STARRS 1 | · | 570 m | MPC · JPL |
| 543560 | 2014 NB_{16} | — | November 20, 2003 | Kitt Peak | Spacewatch | · | 1.2 km | MPC · JPL |
| 543561 | 2014 NF_{16} | — | November 18, 2006 | Kitt Peak | Spacewatch | EUN | 1 km | MPC · JPL |
| 543562 | 2014 NX_{18} | — | October 11, 2006 | Palomar | NEAT | · | 1.7 km | MPC · JPL |
| 543563 | 2014 NE_{19} | — | October 11, 2010 | Mount Lemmon | Mount Lemmon Survey | · | 1.5 km | MPC · JPL |
| 543564 | 2014 NE_{20} | — | December 3, 2002 | Palomar | NEAT | · | 2.1 km | MPC · JPL |
| 543565 | 2014 NM_{20} | — | March 29, 2009 | Mount Lemmon | Mount Lemmon Survey | · | 1.1 km | MPC · JPL |
| 543566 | 2014 NT_{23} | — | February 8, 2013 | Haleakala | Pan-STARRS 1 | · | 680 m | MPC · JPL |
| 543567 | 2014 NQ_{30} | — | June 3, 2014 | ESA OGS | ESA OGS | · | 960 m | MPC · JPL |
| 543568 | 2014 NS_{32} | — | January 18, 2008 | Mount Lemmon | Mount Lemmon Survey | · | 2.5 km | MPC · JPL |
| 543569 | 2014 NZ_{33} | — | July 24, 2003 | Palomar | NEAT | NYS | 1.0 km | MPC · JPL |
| 543570 | 2014 NT_{35} | — | July 2, 2014 | Haleakala | Pan-STARRS 1 | · | 1.2 km | MPC · JPL |
| 543571 | 2014 NW_{40} | — | November 10, 2010 | Mount Lemmon | Mount Lemmon Survey | BRA | 1.5 km | MPC · JPL |
| 543572 | 2014 ND_{45} | — | October 22, 2006 | Palomar | NEAT | · | 2.0 km | MPC · JPL |
| 543573 | 2014 NA_{50} | — | July 3, 2014 | Haleakala | Pan-STARRS 1 | · | 560 m | MPC · JPL |
| 543574 | 2014 NO_{50} | — | May 7, 2014 | Haleakala | Pan-STARRS 1 | · | 1.8 km | MPC · JPL |
| 543575 | 2014 NX_{54} | — | December 1, 2010 | Mount Lemmon | Mount Lemmon Survey | · | 1.3 km | MPC · JPL |
| 543576 | 2014 NQ_{55} | — | September 23, 2011 | Haleakala | Pan-STARRS 1 | · | 840 m | MPC · JPL |
| 543577 | 2014 NP_{56} | — | July 10, 2005 | Siding Spring | SSS | · | 2.0 km | MPC · JPL |
| 543578 | 2014 NN_{58} | — | September 30, 2005 | Catalina | CSS | · | 1.4 km | MPC · JPL |
| 543579 | 2014 NU_{58} | — | June 3, 2014 | Haleakala | Pan-STARRS 1 | · | 1.4 km | MPC · JPL |
| 543580 | 2014 NS_{62} | — | September 4, 2011 | Haleakala | Pan-STARRS 1 | · | 790 m | MPC · JPL |
| 543581 Laurenrubyjane | 2014 NL_{64} | Laurenrubyjane | July 2, 2014 | iTelescope | Falla, N. | · | 1.4 km | MPC · JPL |
| 543582 | 2014 NV_{67} | — | May 7, 2006 | Mount Lemmon | Mount Lemmon Survey | · | 1.2 km | MPC · JPL |
| 543583 | 2014 NX_{67} | — | July 1, 2014 | Haleakala | Pan-STARRS 1 | · | 1.5 km | MPC · JPL |
| 543584 | 2014 NK_{68} | — | February 28, 2008 | Mount Lemmon | Mount Lemmon Survey | · | 1.5 km | MPC · JPL |
| 543585 | 2014 NZ_{68} | — | December 15, 2006 | Kitt Peak | Spacewatch | · | 1.9 km | MPC · JPL |
| 543586 | 2014 NT_{70} | — | November 20, 2008 | Kitt Peak | Spacewatch | · | 940 m | MPC · JPL |
| 543587 | 2014 NC_{73} | — | January 29, 2012 | Kitt Peak | Spacewatch | · | 1.3 km | MPC · JPL |
| 543588 | 2014 NH_{73} | — | November 13, 2006 | Catalina | CSS | EUN | 1.4 km | MPC · JPL |
| 543589 | 2014 NG_{76} | — | September 19, 2015 | Haleakala | Pan-STARRS 1 | · | 1.2 km | MPC · JPL |
| 543590 | 2014 OD | — | June 2, 2014 | Haleakala | Pan-STARRS 1 | V | 500 m | MPC · JPL |
| 543591 | 2014 OX | — | June 27, 2014 | Haleakala | Pan-STARRS 1 | V | 470 m | MPC · JPL |
| 543592 | 2014 ON_{5} | — | June 5, 2014 | Haleakala | Pan-STARRS 1 | · | 1.4 km | MPC · JPL |
| 543593 | 2014 OP_{7} | — | February 9, 2008 | Mount Lemmon | Mount Lemmon Survey | · | 1.9 km | MPC · JPL |
| 543594 | 2014 OK_{9} | — | January 11, 2008 | Kitt Peak | Spacewatch | · | 1.3 km | MPC · JPL |
| 543595 | 2014 OB_{17} | — | October 24, 2011 | Haleakala | Pan-STARRS 1 | · | 1.0 km | MPC · JPL |
| 543596 | 2014 ON_{17} | — | September 17, 2010 | Catalina | CSS | · | 1.3 km | MPC · JPL |
| 543597 | 2014 OY_{21} | — | October 2, 2010 | Nogales | M. Schwartz, P. R. Holvorcem | · | 1.3 km | MPC · JPL |
| 543598 | 2014 OU_{28} | — | July 3, 2014 | Haleakala | Pan-STARRS 1 | · | 1.1 km | MPC · JPL |
| 543599 | 2014 OW_{28} | — | December 21, 2008 | Kitt Peak | Spacewatch | · | 770 m | MPC · JPL |
| 543600 | 2014 OM_{41} | — | July 3, 2014 | Haleakala | Pan-STARRS 1 | PHO | 770 m | MPC · JPL |

== 543601–543700 ==
back to top

| Designation | | | Discovery | | | Properties | | Ref |
| Permanent | Provisional | Named after | Date | Site | Discoverer(s) | Category | Diam. | Ref |
|---|---|---|---|---|---|---|---|---|
| 543601 | 2014 OR_{42} | — | July 3, 2005 | Palomar | NEAT | · | 2.5 km | MPC · JPL |
| 543602 | 2014 OL_{43} | — | July 9, 2005 | Kitt Peak | Spacewatch | · | 1.2 km | MPC · JPL |
| 543603 | 2014 OL_{44} | — | December 4, 2008 | Mount Lemmon | Mount Lemmon Survey | V | 630 m | MPC · JPL |
| 543604 | 2014 ON_{48} | — | July 3, 2014 | Haleakala | Pan-STARRS 1 | · | 900 m | MPC · JPL |
| 543605 | 2014 OV_{48} | — | July 25, 2014 | Haleakala | Pan-STARRS 1 | · | 1.0 km | MPC · JPL |
| 543606 | 2014 OV_{52} | — | February 14, 2013 | Haleakala | Pan-STARRS 1 | · | 710 m | MPC · JPL |
| 543607 | 2014 OF_{60} | — | April 17, 2013 | Cerro Tololo | DECam | · | 1.1 km | MPC · JPL |
| 543608 | 2014 OW_{62} | — | October 9, 2007 | Kitt Peak | Spacewatch | · | 1.0 km | MPC · JPL |
| 543609 | 2014 OK_{63} | — | November 24, 2008 | Mount Lemmon | Mount Lemmon Survey | V | 600 m | MPC · JPL |
| 543610 | 2014 OZ_{65} | — | September 4, 2011 | Haleakala | Pan-STARRS 1 | · | 560 m | MPC · JPL |
| 543611 | 2014 OT_{69} | — | September 17, 2006 | Catalina | CSS | · | 1.1 km | MPC · JPL |
| 543612 | 2014 OT_{71} | — | July 25, 2014 | Haleakala | Pan-STARRS 1 | PHO | 900 m | MPC · JPL |
| 543613 | 2014 OE_{75} | — | January 18, 2012 | Kitt Peak | Spacewatch | · | 980 m | MPC · JPL |
| 543614 | 2014 OL_{78} | — | December 18, 2007 | Mount Lemmon | Mount Lemmon Survey | · | 910 m | MPC · JPL |
| 543615 | 2014 OV_{78} | — | April 11, 2003 | Kitt Peak | Spacewatch | · | 770 m | MPC · JPL |
| 543616 | 2014 OH_{80} | — | June 11, 2010 | Mount Lemmon | Mount Lemmon Survey | · | 1.1 km | MPC · JPL |
| 543617 | 2014 OW_{85} | — | October 4, 2006 | Mount Lemmon | Mount Lemmon Survey | · | 1.3 km | MPC · JPL |
| 543618 | 2014 OZ_{85} | — | April 9, 2010 | Kitt Peak | Spacewatch | NYS | 850 m | MPC · JPL |
| 543619 | 2014 OY_{91} | — | July 4, 2014 | Haleakala | Pan-STARRS 1 | (1547) | 1.4 km | MPC · JPL |
| 543620 | 2014 OK_{96} | — | July 30, 2005 | Palomar | NEAT | · | 1.7 km | MPC · JPL |
| 543621 | 2014 OQ_{107} | — | August 22, 2007 | Charleston | R. Holmes | · | 1 km | MPC · JPL |
| 543622 | 2014 OJ_{108} | — | January 18, 2013 | Kitt Peak | Spacewatch | · | 660 m | MPC · JPL |
| 543623 | 2014 OR_{109} | — | June 2, 2014 | Mount Lemmon | Mount Lemmon Survey | PHO | 790 m | MPC · JPL |
| 543624 | 2014 OC_{114} | — | September 22, 2000 | Kitt Peak | Spacewatch | · | 990 m | MPC · JPL |
| 543625 | 2014 OU_{115} | — | September 30, 2003 | Kitt Peak | Spacewatch | · | 1.1 km | MPC · JPL |
| 543626 | 2014 OH_{123} | — | March 19, 2013 | Haleakala | Pan-STARRS 1 | · | 820 m | MPC · JPL |
| 543627 | 2014 OD_{125} | — | October 7, 2007 | Pla D'Arguines | R. Ferrando, Ferrando, M. | · | 1.0 km | MPC · JPL |
| 543628 | 2014 OZ_{127} | — | June 27, 2014 | Haleakala | Pan-STARRS 1 | · | 1.3 km | MPC · JPL |
| 543629 | 2014 OV_{131} | — | May 23, 2001 | Cerro Tololo | Deep Ecliptic Survey | · | 1.4 km | MPC · JPL |
| 543630 | 2014 OL_{132} | — | June 20, 2014 | Haleakala | Pan-STARRS 1 | · | 1.3 km | MPC · JPL |
| 543631 | 2014 OH_{139} | — | April 26, 2006 | Cerro Tololo | Deep Ecliptic Survey | · | 760 m | MPC · JPL |
| 543632 | 2014 OB_{141} | — | April 10, 2010 | Charleston | R. Holmes | · | 850 m | MPC · JPL |
| 543633 | 2014 OM_{141} | — | September 3, 2010 | Mount Lemmon | Mount Lemmon Survey | · | 1.1 km | MPC · JPL |
| 543634 | 2014 OD_{142} | — | February 2, 2008 | Mount Lemmon | Mount Lemmon Survey | · | 890 m | MPC · JPL |
| 543635 | 2014 OJ_{144} | — | February 17, 2005 | La Silla | A. Boattini | · | 1.2 km | MPC · JPL |
| 543636 | 2014 OB_{147} | — | September 24, 2011 | Bergisch Gladbach | W. Bickel | · | 800 m | MPC · JPL |
| 543637 | 2014 OX_{155} | — | April 16, 2013 | Cerro Tololo | DECam | · | 990 m | MPC · JPL |
| 543638 | 2014 OB_{156} | — | February 9, 2008 | Mount Lemmon | Mount Lemmon Survey | (5) | 1.1 km | MPC · JPL |
| 543639 | 2014 OT_{156} | — | February 6, 2008 | Catalina | CSS | · | 1.6 km | MPC · JPL |
| 543640 | 2014 OA_{158} | — | July 27, 2014 | Haleakala | Pan-STARRS 1 | · | 920 m | MPC · JPL |
| 543641 | 2014 OY_{159} | — | December 29, 2011 | Mount Lemmon | Mount Lemmon Survey | · | 870 m | MPC · JPL |
| 543642 | 2014 OV_{160} | — | July 27, 2014 | Haleakala | Pan-STARRS 1 | JUN | 820 m | MPC · JPL |
| 543643 | 2014 OU_{166} | — | July 27, 2014 | Haleakala | Pan-STARRS 1 | · | 1.0 km | MPC · JPL |
| 543644 | 2014 OL_{168} | — | March 5, 2013 | Haleakala | Pan-STARRS 1 | · | 1.4 km | MPC · JPL |
| 543645 | 2014 OL_{169} | — | July 27, 2014 | Haleakala | Pan-STARRS 1 | EUN | 1.1 km | MPC · JPL |
| 543646 | 2014 OX_{171} | — | July 27, 2014 | Haleakala | Pan-STARRS 1 | · | 1.0 km | MPC · JPL |
| 543647 | 2014 OJ_{172} | — | July 27, 2014 | Haleakala | Pan-STARRS 1 | · | 940 m | MPC · JPL |
| 543648 | 2014 OQ_{174} | — | July 27, 2014 | Haleakala | Pan-STARRS 1 | · | 760 m | MPC · JPL |
| 543649 | 2014 OO_{175} | — | July 27, 2014 | Haleakala | Pan-STARRS 1 | · | 1.7 km | MPC · JPL |
| 543650 | 2014 OT_{179} | — | July 27, 2014 | Haleakala | Pan-STARRS 1 | MAR | 1.0 km | MPC · JPL |
| 543651 | 2014 OB_{183} | — | April 10, 2010 | Mount Lemmon | Mount Lemmon Survey | · | 720 m | MPC · JPL |
| 543652 | 2014 OU_{183} | — | July 27, 2014 | Haleakala | Pan-STARRS 1 | (5) | 870 m | MPC · JPL |
| 543653 | 2014 OS_{186} | — | January 26, 2006 | Kitt Peak | Spacewatch | · | 1.1 km | MPC · JPL |
| 543654 | 2014 OF_{192} | — | February 12, 2013 | ESA OGS | ESA OGS | · | 940 m | MPC · JPL |
| 543655 | 2014 OR_{192} | — | February 25, 2007 | Kitt Peak | Spacewatch | · | 2.2 km | MPC · JPL |
| 543656 | 2014 OC_{194} | — | September 24, 2005 | Kitt Peak | Spacewatch | AGN | 1.2 km | MPC · JPL |
| 543657 | 2014 OM_{200} | — | August 10, 2007 | Kitt Peak | Spacewatch | · | 870 m | MPC · JPL |
| 543658 | 2014 OF_{210} | — | June 27, 2014 | Haleakala | Pan-STARRS 1 | V | 520 m | MPC · JPL |
| 543659 | 2014 OL_{213} | — | July 27, 2014 | Haleakala | Pan-STARRS 1 | · | 1.1 km | MPC · JPL |
| 543660 | 2014 OC_{215} | — | October 25, 2006 | Siding Spring | SSS | · | 1.2 km | MPC · JPL |
| 543661 | 2014 OE_{218} | — | February 4, 2009 | Mount Lemmon | Mount Lemmon Survey | · | 1.0 km | MPC · JPL |
| 543662 | 2014 OD_{222} | — | July 27, 2014 | Haleakala | Pan-STARRS 1 | · | 1.1 km | MPC · JPL |
| 543663 | 2014 OK_{223} | — | February 2, 2008 | Kitt Peak | Spacewatch | ADE | 1.5 km | MPC · JPL |
| 543664 | 2014 OA_{230} | — | July 27, 2014 | Haleakala | Pan-STARRS 1 | EUN | 920 m | MPC · JPL |
| 543665 | 2014 OK_{230} | — | February 16, 2012 | Haleakala | Pan-STARRS 1 | (5) | 1.0 km | MPC · JPL |
| 543666 | 2014 ON_{232} | — | February 13, 2008 | Mount Lemmon | Mount Lemmon Survey | HNS | 1.0 km | MPC · JPL |
| 543667 | 2014 OS_{235} | — | May 9, 2014 | Haleakala | Pan-STARRS 1 | · | 2.9 km | MPC · JPL |
| 543668 | 2014 OY_{240} | — | June 2, 2014 | Mount Lemmon | Mount Lemmon Survey | MAS | 590 m | MPC · JPL |
| 543669 | 2014 OR_{243} | — | October 14, 2010 | Catalina | CSS | · | 1.5 km | MPC · JPL |
| 543670 | 2014 OZ_{243} | — | November 27, 2011 | Mount Lemmon | Mount Lemmon Survey | EUN | 1.1 km | MPC · JPL |
| 543671 | 2014 OY_{247} | — | July 29, 2014 | Haleakala | Pan-STARRS 1 | · | 1.1 km | MPC · JPL |
| 543672 | 2014 ON_{249} | — | April 24, 2006 | Kitt Peak | Spacewatch | CLA | 1.5 km | MPC · JPL |
| 543673 | 2014 OF_{252} | — | July 29, 2014 | Haleakala | Pan-STARRS 1 | V | 560 m | MPC · JPL |
| 543674 | 2014 OR_{252} | — | September 27, 2006 | Mount Lemmon | Mount Lemmon Survey | · | 1.4 km | MPC · JPL |
| 543675 | 2014 OB_{257} | — | October 25, 2011 | Haleakala | Pan-STARRS 1 | V | 530 m | MPC · JPL |
| 543676 | 2014 OY_{259} | — | August 3, 2010 | Kitt Peak | Spacewatch | · | 1.6 km | MPC · JPL |
| 543677 | 2014 OD_{260} | — | June 29, 2014 | Haleakala | Pan-STARRS 1 | · | 1.1 km | MPC · JPL |
| 543678 | 2014 OK_{260} | — | June 27, 2014 | Haleakala | Pan-STARRS 1 | EUN | 940 m | MPC · JPL |
| 543679 | 2014 OY_{263} | — | March 5, 2013 | Kitt Peak | Spacewatch | · | 1.0 km | MPC · JPL |
| 543680 | 2014 OA_{274} | — | January 30, 2012 | Mount Lemmon | Mount Lemmon Survey | EUN | 1.1 km | MPC · JPL |
| 543681 | 2014 OA_{276} | — | October 13, 2010 | Mount Lemmon | Mount Lemmon Survey | · | 1.6 km | MPC · JPL |
| 543682 | 2014 OG_{276} | — | July 29, 2014 | Haleakala | Pan-STARRS 1 | PHO | 710 m | MPC · JPL |
| 543683 | 2014 OZ_{279} | — | July 25, 2014 | Haleakala | Pan-STARRS 1 | · | 850 m | MPC · JPL |
| 543684 | 2014 OJ_{280} | — | January 21, 2013 | Haleakala | Pan-STARRS 1 | · | 1.4 km | MPC · JPL |
| 543685 | 2014 OK_{281} | — | August 19, 2010 | Kitt Peak | Spacewatch | · | 1.6 km | MPC · JPL |
| 543686 | 2014 OJ_{282} | — | January 19, 2008 | Mount Lemmon | Mount Lemmon Survey | · | 1.4 km | MPC · JPL |
| 543687 | 2014 OT_{282} | — | March 3, 2006 | Catalina | CSS | ERI | 1.3 km | MPC · JPL |
| 543688 | 2014 OZ_{283} | — | January 16, 2007 | Mount Lemmon | Mount Lemmon Survey | · | 2.2 km | MPC · JPL |
| 543689 | 2014 OR_{285} | — | April 9, 2010 | Kitt Peak | Spacewatch | · | 810 m | MPC · JPL |
| 543690 | 2014 ON_{286} | — | June 28, 2014 | Haleakala | Pan-STARRS 1 | · | 1.5 km | MPC · JPL |
| 543691 | 2014 OY_{286} | — | November 8, 2010 | Mount Lemmon | Mount Lemmon Survey | · | 1.4 km | MPC · JPL |
| 543692 | 2014 OU_{288} | — | April 13, 2010 | Catalina | CSS | · | 600 m | MPC · JPL |
| 543693 | 2014 OU_{293} | — | January 30, 2008 | Mount Lemmon | Mount Lemmon Survey | · | 1.1 km | MPC · JPL |
| 543694 | 2014 OS_{294} | — | November 1, 2010 | Mount Lemmon | Mount Lemmon Survey | · | 1.1 km | MPC · JPL |
| 543695 | 2014 OT_{295} | — | July 22, 2001 | Palomar | NEAT | · | 1.4 km | MPC · JPL |
| 543696 | 2014 OF_{297} | — | April 10, 2013 | Mount Lemmon | Mount Lemmon Survey | · | 1.4 km | MPC · JPL |
| 543697 | 2014 OF_{306} | — | July 3, 2014 | Haleakala | Pan-STARRS 1 | · | 930 m | MPC · JPL |
| 543698 Miromesaroš | 2014 OF_{309} | Miromesaroš | October 6, 2011 | Piszkéstető | S. Kürti, K. Sárneczky | · | 1.1 km | MPC · JPL |
| 543699 | 2014 OU_{309} | — | January 20, 2009 | Mount Lemmon | Mount Lemmon Survey | · | 840 m | MPC · JPL |
| 543700 | 2014 OS_{310} | — | September 17, 2010 | Mount Lemmon | Mount Lemmon Survey | · | 1.3 km | MPC · JPL |

== 543701–543800 ==
back to top

| Designation | | | Discovery | | | Properties | | Ref |
| Permanent | Provisional | Named after | Date | Site | Discoverer(s) | Category | Diam. | Ref |
|---|---|---|---|---|---|---|---|---|
| 543701 | 2014 OE_{312} | — | July 2, 2014 | Haleakala | Pan-STARRS 1 | · | 750 m | MPC · JPL |
| 543702 | 2014 OC_{318} | — | November 8, 2010 | Kitt Peak | Spacewatch | · | 1.9 km | MPC · JPL |
| 543703 | 2014 OP_{318} | — | October 22, 2011 | Kitt Peak | Spacewatch | · | 1.0 km | MPC · JPL |
| 543704 | 2014 OC_{321} | — | December 31, 2007 | Kitt Peak | Spacewatch | (5) | 890 m | MPC · JPL |
| 543705 | 2014 OW_{321} | — | May 15, 2009 | Kitt Peak | Spacewatch | · | 1.6 km | MPC · JPL |
| 543706 | 2014 OL_{332} | — | December 28, 1998 | Kitt Peak | Spacewatch | · | 1.2 km | MPC · JPL |
| 543707 | 2014 OJ_{337} | — | July 30, 2014 | Haleakala | Pan-STARRS 1 | AGN | 890 m | MPC · JPL |
| 543708 | 2014 OK_{340} | — | March 14, 1999 | Kitt Peak | Spacewatch | · | 830 m | MPC · JPL |
| 543709 | 2014 OP_{340} | — | September 12, 2007 | Mount Lemmon | Mount Lemmon Survey | NYS | 1.1 km | MPC · JPL |
| 543710 | 2014 OM_{343} | — | July 9, 2007 | Lulin | LUSS | · | 850 m | MPC · JPL |
| 543711 | 2014 OJ_{349} | — | November 16, 2011 | Mount Lemmon | Mount Lemmon Survey | · | 1.1 km | MPC · JPL |
| 543712 | 2014 OZ_{349} | — | September 27, 2011 | Kitt Peak | Spacewatch | · | 1.2 km | MPC · JPL |
| 543713 | 2014 OU_{352} | — | August 29, 2006 | Kitt Peak | Spacewatch | · | 1.3 km | MPC · JPL |
| 543714 | 2014 OC_{353} | — | September 30, 2011 | Kitt Peak | Spacewatch | · | 1.2 km | MPC · JPL |
| 543715 | 2014 OJ_{368} | — | June 27, 2014 | Haleakala | Pan-STARRS 1 | · | 1.0 km | MPC · JPL |
| 543716 | 2014 OX_{369} | — | December 30, 2011 | Kitt Peak | Spacewatch | · | 1.1 km | MPC · JPL |
| 543717 | 2014 OR_{372} | — | May 9, 2006 | Mount Lemmon | Mount Lemmon Survey | · | 1.2 km | MPC · JPL |
| 543718 | 2014 OF_{373} | — | January 1, 2012 | Mount Lemmon | Mount Lemmon Survey | PHO | 810 m | MPC · JPL |
| 543719 | 2014 OH_{373} | — | August 15, 2009 | Kitt Peak | Spacewatch | EOS | 1.9 km | MPC · JPL |
| 543720 | 2014 OG_{376} | — | December 26, 2011 | Kitt Peak | Spacewatch | · | 1.5 km | MPC · JPL |
| 543721 | 2014 OR_{377} | — | March 6, 2013 | Haleakala | Pan-STARRS 1 | · | 1.0 km | MPC · JPL |
| 543722 | 2014 OZ_{379} | — | May 25, 2014 | Haleakala | Pan-STARRS 1 | NYS | 920 m | MPC · JPL |
| 543723 | 2014 OT_{381} | — | July 27, 2014 | Haleakala | Pan-STARRS 1 | · | 700 m | MPC · JPL |
| 543724 | 2014 OV_{383} | — | June 28, 2014 | Haleakala | Pan-STARRS 1 | · | 1.6 km | MPC · JPL |
| 543725 | 2014 OZ_{383} | — | January 31, 2009 | Mount Lemmon | Mount Lemmon Survey | V | 740 m | MPC · JPL |
| 543726 | 2014 OS_{385} | — | July 4, 2014 | Haleakala | Pan-STARRS 1 | V | 420 m | MPC · JPL |
| 543727 | 2014 OK_{386} | — | September 17, 2010 | Catalina | CSS | ADE | 1.7 km | MPC · JPL |
| 543728 | 2014 OG_{388} | — | June 27, 2014 | Haleakala | Pan-STARRS 1 | · | 1.3 km | MPC · JPL |
| 543729 | 2014 OH_{389} | — | September 28, 2005 | Palomar | NEAT | · | 2.2 km | MPC · JPL |
| 543730 | 2014 OX_{390} | — | July 28, 2014 | Haleakala | Pan-STARRS 1 | EUN | 1.1 km | MPC · JPL |
| 543731 | 2014 OH_{391} | — | June 10, 2005 | Kitt Peak | Spacewatch | · | 1.6 km | MPC · JPL |
| 543732 | 2014 OH_{393} | — | September 3, 2014 | Catalina | CSS | · | 2.3 km | MPC · JPL |
| 543733 | 2014 OZ_{393} | — | July 31, 2014 | Haleakala | Pan-STARRS 1 | cubewano (hot) | 249 km | MPC · JPL |
| 543734 | 2014 OL_{394} | — | July 30, 2014 | Haleakala | Pan-STARRS 1 | res · 3:5 | 104 km | MPC · JPL |
| 543735 | 2014 OS_{394} | — | July 28, 2014 | Haleakala | Pan-STARRS 1 | res · 1:11 | 232 km | MPC · JPL |
| 543736 | 2014 OV_{398} | — | January 30, 2006 | Flagstaff | Wasserman, L. H. | V | 570 m | MPC · JPL |
| 543737 | 2014 OP_{399} | — | July 10, 2010 | WISE | WISE | · | 1.3 km | MPC · JPL |
| 543738 | 2014 OS_{400} | — | October 22, 2006 | Goodricke-Pigott | R. A. Tucker | · | 1 km | MPC · JPL |
| 543739 | 2014 OW_{400} | — | December 31, 2008 | Kitt Peak | Spacewatch | · | 870 m | MPC · JPL |
| 543740 | 2014 OY_{400} | — | October 12, 2007 | Mount Lemmon | Mount Lemmon Survey | · | 920 m | MPC · JPL |
| 543741 | 2014 OT_{401} | — | January 26, 2012 | Mount Lemmon | Mount Lemmon Survey | · | 1.3 km | MPC · JPL |
| 543742 | 2014 ON_{402} | — | March 11, 2013 | Kitt Peak | Spacewatch | · | 1.1 km | MPC · JPL |
| 543743 | 2014 OF_{404} | — | January 2, 2012 | Kitt Peak | Spacewatch | · | 860 m | MPC · JPL |
| 543744 | 2014 OT_{404} | — | September 25, 2006 | Molėtai | K. Černis, J. Zdanavičius | MAR | 1.1 km | MPC · JPL |
| 543745 | 2014 OU_{404} | — | October 9, 2007 | Mount Lemmon | Mount Lemmon Survey | · | 1.3 km | MPC · JPL |
| 543746 | 2014 OH_{405} | — | September 30, 2006 | Kitt Peak | Spacewatch | · | 940 m | MPC · JPL |
| 543747 | 2014 OP_{405} | — | July 25, 2014 | Haleakala | Pan-STARRS 1 | MAR | 850 m | MPC · JPL |
| 543748 | 2014 OB_{408} | — | July 25, 2014 | Haleakala | Pan-STARRS 1 | · | 950 m | MPC · JPL |
| 543749 | 2014 OE_{408} | — | February 14, 2009 | Kitt Peak | Spacewatch | · | 1.1 km | MPC · JPL |
| 543750 | 2014 OM_{408} | — | October 22, 2006 | Kitt Peak | Spacewatch | · | 840 m | MPC · JPL |
| 543751 | 2014 OL_{410} | — | July 27, 2014 | Haleakala | Pan-STARRS 1 | · | 1.9 km | MPC · JPL |
| 543752 | 2014 OF_{412} | — | April 21, 2009 | Kitt Peak | Spacewatch | · | 1.6 km | MPC · JPL |
| 543753 | 2014 OP_{412} | — | April 6, 2008 | Kitt Peak | Spacewatch | GEF | 1.2 km | MPC · JPL |
| 543754 | 2014 OR_{413} | — | July 30, 2014 | Haleakala | Pan-STARRS 1 | · | 2.0 km | MPC · JPL |
| 543755 | 2014 OK_{414} | — | July 31, 2014 | Haleakala | Pan-STARRS 1 | · | 1.8 km | MPC · JPL |
| 543756 | 2014 OG_{415} | — | July 31, 2014 | Haleakala | Pan-STARRS 1 | · | 1.5 km | MPC · JPL |
| 543757 | 2014 OH_{415} | — | July 31, 2014 | Haleakala | Pan-STARRS 1 | · | 1.6 km | MPC · JPL |
| 543758 | 2014 OH_{417} | — | July 27, 2014 | Haleakala | Pan-STARRS 1 | · | 1.2 km | MPC · JPL |
| 543759 | 2014 PG_{1} | — | June 2, 2014 | Mount Lemmon | Mount Lemmon Survey | · | 1.2 km | MPC · JPL |
| 543760 | 2014 PD_{13} | — | June 28, 2014 | Haleakala | Pan-STARRS 1 | NYS | 940 m | MPC · JPL |
| 543761 | 2014 PM_{16} | — | February 7, 2000 | Kitt Peak | Spacewatch | · | 1.1 km | MPC · JPL |
| 543762 | 2014 PT_{18} | — | July 28, 2014 | ESA OGS | ESA OGS | · | 1.7 km | MPC · JPL |
| 543763 | 2014 PE_{26} | — | September 18, 2007 | Mount Lemmon | Mount Lemmon Survey | · | 1.1 km | MPC · JPL |
| 543764 | 2014 PH_{26} | — | January 26, 2012 | Mount Lemmon | Mount Lemmon Survey | · | 1.4 km | MPC · JPL |
| 543765 | 2014 PC_{27} | — | October 20, 2003 | Kitt Peak | Spacewatch | · | 1.1 km | MPC · JPL |
| 543766 | 2014 PF_{27} | — | December 31, 2007 | Mount Lemmon | Mount Lemmon Survey | · | 1.1 km | MPC · JPL |
| 543767 | 2014 PK_{32} | — | December 2, 2005 | Mauna Kea | A. Boattini | · | 780 m | MPC · JPL |
| 543768 | 2014 PZ_{37} | — | October 20, 2002 | Palomar | NEAT | · | 1.4 km | MPC · JPL |
| 543769 | 2014 PS_{38} | — | October 12, 2010 | Catalina | CSS | (5) | 960 m | MPC · JPL |
| 543770 | 2014 PX_{38} | — | August 4, 2014 | Haleakala | Pan-STARRS 1 | EUN | 990 m | MPC · JPL |
| 543771 | 2014 PF_{39} | — | February 14, 2008 | Mount Lemmon | Mount Lemmon Survey | HNS | 1.1 km | MPC · JPL |
| 543772 | 2014 PY_{39} | — | October 1, 2005 | Mount Lemmon | Mount Lemmon Survey | · | 1.6 km | MPC · JPL |
| 543773 | 2014 PZ_{39} | — | February 7, 2003 | La Silla | Barbieri, C. | NEM | 1.9 km | MPC · JPL |
| 543774 | 2014 PH_{41} | — | January 19, 2012 | Mount Lemmon | Mount Lemmon Survey | · | 1.5 km | MPC · JPL |
| 543775 | 2014 PM_{41} | — | July 12, 2005 | Mount Lemmon | Mount Lemmon Survey | · | 1.8 km | MPC · JPL |
| 543776 | 2014 PZ_{42} | — | May 10, 2005 | Kitt Peak | Spacewatch | · | 1.3 km | MPC · JPL |
| 543777 | 2014 PW_{44} | — | October 19, 1995 | Kitt Peak | Spacewatch | NYS | 950 m | MPC · JPL |
| 543778 | 2014 PB_{45} | — | July 25, 2014 | Haleakala | Pan-STARRS 1 | · | 1.3 km | MPC · JPL |
| 543779 | 2014 PL_{47} | — | January 19, 2012 | Haleakala | Pan-STARRS 1 | GEF | 1.1 km | MPC · JPL |
| 543780 | 2014 PQ_{48} | — | June 23, 2014 | Mount Lemmon | Mount Lemmon Survey | · | 1.9 km | MPC · JPL |
| 543781 | 2014 PS_{48} | — | July 29, 2014 | ESA OGS | ESA OGS | · | 940 m | MPC · JPL |
| 543782 | 2014 PX_{48} | — | September 13, 2007 | Mount Lemmon | Mount Lemmon Survey | · | 940 m | MPC · JPL |
| 543783 | 2014 PT_{50} | — | June 24, 2014 | Mount Lemmon | Mount Lemmon Survey | · | 1.3 km | MPC · JPL |
| 543784 | 2014 PL_{54} | — | April 15, 2013 | Haleakala | Pan-STARRS 1 | MAR | 1.1 km | MPC · JPL |
| 543785 | 2014 PK_{55} | — | April 19, 2013 | Mount Lemmon | Mount Lemmon Survey | · | 1.2 km | MPC · JPL |
| 543786 | 2014 PK_{57} | — | September 30, 2006 | Catalina | CSS | · | 1.4 km | MPC · JPL |
| 543787 | 2014 PM_{61} | — | September 30, 2006 | Mount Lemmon | Mount Lemmon Survey | · | 1.1 km | MPC · JPL |
| 543788 | 2014 PS_{63} | — | February 13, 2002 | Kitt Peak | Spacewatch | · | 1.0 km | MPC · JPL |
| 543789 | 2014 PC_{64} | — | August 29, 2005 | Palomar | NEAT | DOR | 2.2 km | MPC · JPL |
| 543790 | 2014 PE_{67} | — | October 17, 2006 | Catalina | CSS | HNS | 1.3 km | MPC · JPL |
| 543791 | 2014 PH_{68} | — | June 2, 2014 | Mount Lemmon | Mount Lemmon Survey | · | 960 m | MPC · JPL |
| 543792 | 2014 PZ_{69} | — | September 25, 2006 | Catalina | CSS | EUN | 1.3 km | MPC · JPL |
| 543793 | 2014 PA_{74} | — | January 19, 2012 | Haleakala | Pan-STARRS 1 | EUN | 860 m | MPC · JPL |
| 543794 | 2014 PV_{74} | — | December 2, 2010 | Catalina | CSS | · | 1.1 km | MPC · JPL |
| 543795 | 2014 PY_{75} | — | October 10, 2010 | Kitt Peak | Spacewatch | · | 1.2 km | MPC · JPL |
| 543796 | 2014 PQ_{78} | — | June 29, 2014 | Haleakala | Pan-STARRS 1 | · | 1.6 km | MPC · JPL |
| 543797 | 2014 PR_{84} | — | August 6, 2014 | Haleakala | Pan-STARRS 1 | · | 1.9 km | MPC · JPL |
| 543798 | 2014 QH_{1} | — | December 20, 2006 | Palomar | NEAT | · | 1.5 km | MPC · JPL |
| 543799 | 2014 QB_{8} | — | November 20, 2003 | Kitt Peak | Spacewatch | · | 1.4 km | MPC · JPL |
| 543800 | 2014 QT_{11} | — | November 3, 2011 | Kitt Peak | Spacewatch | PHO | 790 m | MPC · JPL |

== 543801–543900 ==
back to top

| Designation | | | Discovery | | | Properties | | Ref |
| Permanent | Provisional | Named after | Date | Site | Discoverer(s) | Category | Diam. | Ref |
|---|---|---|---|---|---|---|---|---|
| 543801 | 2014 QC_{12} | — | November 25, 2006 | Kitt Peak | Spacewatch | · | 1.7 km | MPC · JPL |
| 543802 | 2014 QK_{17} | — | August 18, 2014 | Haleakala | Pan-STARRS 1 | · | 1.4 km | MPC · JPL |
| 543803 | 2014 QW_{17} | — | November 15, 2006 | Mount Lemmon | Mount Lemmon Survey | · | 1.8 km | MPC · JPL |
| 543804 | 2014 QN_{18} | — | March 1, 2009 | Kitt Peak | Spacewatch | · | 1.2 km | MPC · JPL |
| 543805 | 2014 QL_{24} | — | January 19, 2012 | Haleakala | Pan-STARRS 1 | · | 1.2 km | MPC · JPL |
| 543806 | 2014 QQ_{28} | — | January 7, 1999 | Kitt Peak | Spacewatch | · | 1.8 km | MPC · JPL |
| 543807 | 2014 QV_{30} | — | August 18, 2014 | Haleakala | Pan-STARRS 1 | · | 1.8 km | MPC · JPL |
| 543808 | 2014 QK_{31} | — | June 17, 2005 | Mount Lemmon | Mount Lemmon Survey | EUN | 920 m | MPC · JPL |
| 543809 | 2014 QO_{37} | — | December 15, 2006 | Mount Lemmon | Mount Lemmon Survey | · | 1.3 km | MPC · JPL |
| 543810 | 2014 QE_{42} | — | September 13, 2005 | Kitt Peak | Spacewatch | · | 1.4 km | MPC · JPL |
| 543811 | 2014 QW_{42} | — | November 14, 2010 | Catalina | CSS | EUN | 1.3 km | MPC · JPL |
| 543812 | 2014 QV_{43} | — | January 24, 2012 | Haleakala | Pan-STARRS 1 | EUN | 950 m | MPC · JPL |
| 543813 | 2014 QW_{46} | — | June 29, 2014 | Haleakala | Pan-STARRS 1 | · | 1.1 km | MPC · JPL |
| 543814 | 2014 QU_{48} | — | September 22, 2011 | Mount Lemmon | Mount Lemmon Survey | V | 520 m | MPC · JPL |
| 543815 | 2014 QZ_{51} | — | December 22, 2003 | Kitt Peak | Spacewatch | (5) | 1.0 km | MPC · JPL |
| 543816 | 2014 QS_{61} | — | February 4, 2006 | Mount Lemmon | Mount Lemmon Survey | · | 600 m | MPC · JPL |
| 543817 | 2014 QF_{63} | — | January 15, 2008 | Mount Lemmon | Mount Lemmon Survey | ADE | 2.0 km | MPC · JPL |
| 543818 | 2014 QL_{72} | — | July 1, 2014 | Haleakala | Pan-STARRS 1 | · | 1.1 km | MPC · JPL |
| 543819 | 2014 QT_{72} | — | July 1, 2014 | Haleakala | Pan-STARRS 1 | · | 1.2 km | MPC · JPL |
| 543820 | 2014 QV_{72} | — | March 12, 2013 | Kitt Peak | Research and Education Collaborative Occultation Network | · | 1.0 km | MPC · JPL |
| 543821 | 2014 QR_{73} | — | June 3, 2014 | Haleakala | Pan-STARRS 1 | · | 2.0 km | MPC · JPL |
| 543822 | 2014 QX_{76} | — | August 20, 2014 | Haleakala | Pan-STARRS 1 | · | 1.1 km | MPC · JPL |
| 543823 | 2014 QT_{79} | — | November 2, 2011 | Kitt Peak | Spacewatch | · | 1.2 km | MPC · JPL |
| 543824 | 2014 QX_{79} | — | September 26, 2005 | Kitt Peak | Spacewatch | · | 1.5 km | MPC · JPL |
| 543825 | 2014 QO_{83} | — | November 27, 2006 | Mount Lemmon | Mount Lemmon Survey | · | 1.8 km | MPC · JPL |
| 543826 | 2014 QF_{84} | — | January 1, 2009 | Kitt Peak | Spacewatch | V | 660 m | MPC · JPL |
| 543827 | 2014 QR_{84} | — | June 30, 2014 | Mount Lemmon | Mount Lemmon Survey | · | 1.4 km | MPC · JPL |
| 543828 | 2014 QK_{85} | — | December 30, 2007 | Kitt Peak | Spacewatch | · | 1.0 km | MPC · JPL |
| 543829 | 2014 QO_{85} | — | October 10, 2010 | Mount Lemmon | Mount Lemmon Survey | · | 1.7 km | MPC · JPL |
| 543830 | 2014 QQ_{90} | — | September 23, 2011 | Kitt Peak | Spacewatch | · | 720 m | MPC · JPL |
| 543831 | 2014 QE_{99} | — | August 20, 2014 | Haleakala | Pan-STARRS 1 | · | 1.3 km | MPC · JPL |
| 543832 | 2014 QE_{103} | — | January 26, 2012 | Mount Lemmon | Mount Lemmon Survey | · | 1.1 km | MPC · JPL |
| 543833 | 2014 QX_{109} | — | July 24, 2014 | Mayhill-ISON | L. Elenin | · | 1.2 km | MPC · JPL |
| 543834 | 2014 QT_{115} | — | August 18, 2006 | Kitt Peak | Spacewatch | · | 810 m | MPC · JPL |
| 543835 | 2014 QU_{116} | — | February 27, 2012 | Haleakala | Pan-STARRS 1 | (5) | 920 m | MPC · JPL |
| 543836 | 2014 QN_{117} | — | February 9, 2002 | Kitt Peak | Spacewatch | NYS | 900 m | MPC · JPL |
| 543837 | 2014 QS_{120} | — | August 28, 2006 | Kitt Peak | Spacewatch | · | 1.2 km | MPC · JPL |
| 543838 | 2014 QW_{126} | — | August 6, 2014 | Haleakala | Pan-STARRS 1 | BAR | 1.2 km | MPC · JPL |
| 543839 | 2014 QK_{134} | — | November 9, 2007 | Mount Lemmon | Mount Lemmon Survey | · | 1 km | MPC · JPL |
| 543840 | 2014 QX_{138} | — | September 5, 2010 | Mount Lemmon | Mount Lemmon Survey | · | 1.4 km | MPC · JPL |
| 543841 | 2014 QD_{144} | — | November 3, 2010 | Catalina | CSS | MIS | 2.0 km | MPC · JPL |
| 543842 | 2014 QJ_{149} | — | March 8, 2008 | Mount Lemmon | Mount Lemmon Survey | · | 1.4 km | MPC · JPL |
| 543843 | 2014 QP_{149} | — | February 26, 2004 | Kitt Peak | Deep Ecliptic Survey | · | 1.2 km | MPC · JPL |
| 543844 | 2014 QT_{151} | — | August 20, 2014 | Haleakala | Pan-STARRS 1 | MAR | 840 m | MPC · JPL |
| 543845 | 2014 QU_{151} | — | August 6, 2014 | Haleakala | Pan-STARRS 1 | · | 1.8 km | MPC · JPL |
| 543846 | 2014 QF_{156} | — | September 11, 2010 | Mount Lemmon | Mount Lemmon Survey | DOR | 1.8 km | MPC · JPL |
| 543847 | 2014 QQ_{161} | — | October 24, 2011 | Haleakala | Pan-STARRS 1 | V | 560 m | MPC · JPL |
| 543848 | 2014 QT_{164} | — | December 16, 2007 | Mount Lemmon | Mount Lemmon Survey | · | 1.0 km | MPC · JPL |
| 543849 | 2014 QX_{164} | — | November 11, 1999 | Kitt Peak | Spacewatch | NYS | 830 m | MPC · JPL |
| 543850 | 2014 QT_{166} | — | December 3, 2010 | Mount Lemmon | Mount Lemmon Survey | · | 2.3 km | MPC · JPL |
| 543851 | 2014 QK_{167} | — | August 22, 2014 | Haleakala | Pan-STARRS 1 | EUN | 1.2 km | MPC · JPL |
| 543852 | 2014 QQ_{167} | — | August 22, 2014 | Haleakala | Pan-STARRS 1 | · | 1.1 km | MPC · JPL |
| 543853 | 2014 QJ_{171} | — | February 1, 2006 | Kitt Peak | Spacewatch | · | 730 m | MPC · JPL |
| 543854 | 2014 QS_{171} | — | November 16, 2011 | Kitt Peak | Spacewatch | · | 1.2 km | MPC · JPL |
| 543855 | 2014 QM_{179} | — | November 7, 2010 | Mayhill-ISON | L. Elenin | EUN | 870 m | MPC · JPL |
| 543856 | 2014 QF_{182} | — | January 4, 2012 | Mount Lemmon | Mount Lemmon Survey | · | 1.7 km | MPC · JPL |
| 543857 | 2014 QF_{194} | — | November 19, 2007 | Mount Lemmon | Mount Lemmon Survey | · | 800 m | MPC · JPL |
| 543858 | 2014 QS_{196} | — | October 25, 2011 | Haleakala | Pan-STARRS 1 | V | 510 m | MPC · JPL |
| 543859 | 2014 QJ_{200} | — | March 6, 2013 | Haleakala | Pan-STARRS 1 | · | 1.1 km | MPC · JPL |
| 543860 | 2014 QN_{200} | — | October 10, 2007 | Kitt Peak | Spacewatch | · | 1.1 km | MPC · JPL |
| 543861 | 2014 QU_{201} | — | August 22, 2014 | Haleakala | Pan-STARRS 1 | JUN | 790 m | MPC · JPL |
| 543862 | 2014 QJ_{202} | — | September 12, 2010 | Kitt Peak | Spacewatch | · | 1.1 km | MPC · JPL |
| 543863 | 2014 QA_{204} | — | February 22, 2004 | Kitt Peak | Spacewatch | · | 1.5 km | MPC · JPL |
| 543864 | 2014 QW_{208} | — | May 29, 2003 | Kitt Peak | Spacewatch | · | 690 m | MPC · JPL |
| 543865 | 2014 QE_{214} | — | March 25, 2006 | Mount Lemmon | Mount Lemmon Survey | NYS | 710 m | MPC · JPL |
| 543866 | 2014 QE_{215} | — | September 18, 2006 | Kitt Peak | Spacewatch | (5) | 760 m | MPC · JPL |
| 543867 | 2014 QA_{216} | — | September 26, 2005 | Palomar | NEAT | HOF | 3.1 km | MPC · JPL |
| 543868 | 2014 QQ_{216} | — | October 19, 2006 | Mount Lemmon | Mount Lemmon Survey | (5) | 930 m | MPC · JPL |
| 543869 | 2014 QO_{217} | — | February 25, 2006 | Kitt Peak | Spacewatch | · | 840 m | MPC · JPL |
| 543870 | 2014 QQ_{217} | — | August 3, 2014 | Haleakala | Pan-STARRS 1 | PHO | 980 m | MPC · JPL |
| 543871 | 2014 QD_{223} | — | August 22, 2014 | Haleakala | Pan-STARRS 1 | V | 560 m | MPC · JPL |
| 543872 | 2014 QK_{226} | — | July 28, 2014 | Haleakala | Pan-STARRS 1 | · | 2.3 km | MPC · JPL |
| 543873 | 2014 QY_{226} | — | October 1, 2005 | Kitt Peak | Spacewatch | AGN | 780 m | MPC · JPL |
| 543874 | 2014 QY_{228} | — | July 28, 2014 | Haleakala | Pan-STARRS 1 | · | 1.1 km | MPC · JPL |
| 543875 | 2014 QP_{229} | — | February 28, 2012 | Haleakala | Pan-STARRS 1 | · | 1.4 km | MPC · JPL |
| 543876 | 2014 QN_{231} | — | September 4, 2010 | Mount Lemmon | Mount Lemmon Survey | · | 1.3 km | MPC · JPL |
| 543877 | 2014 QG_{232} | — | November 1, 2005 | Catalina | CSS | · | 1.4 km | MPC · JPL |
| 543878 | 2014 QC_{233} | — | July 30, 2005 | Palomar | NEAT | · | 1.8 km | MPC · JPL |
| 543879 | 2014 QK_{233} | — | February 13, 2008 | Catalina | CSS | · | 1.0 km | MPC · JPL |
| 543880 | 2014 QE_{235} | — | November 25, 2006 | Catalina | CSS | · | 1.1 km | MPC · JPL |
| 543881 | 2014 QG_{243} | — | August 22, 2014 | Haleakala | Pan-STARRS 1 | DOR | 1.5 km | MPC · JPL |
| 543882 | 2014 QW_{244} | — | August 22, 2014 | Haleakala | Pan-STARRS 1 | · | 990 m | MPC · JPL |
| 543883 | 2014 QZ_{244} | — | March 17, 2013 | Palomar | Palomar Transient Factory | · | 800 m | MPC · JPL |
| 543884 | 2014 QO_{249} | — | April 24, 2006 | Kitt Peak | Spacewatch | · | 950 m | MPC · JPL |
| 543885 | 2014 QT_{249} | — | April 25, 2007 | Mount Lemmon | Mount Lemmon Survey | (21885) | 2.6 km | MPC · JPL |
| 543886 | 2014 QP_{252} | — | October 17, 2010 | Mount Lemmon | Mount Lemmon Survey | GEF | 1.1 km | MPC · JPL |
| 543887 | 2014 QD_{255} | — | July 31, 2014 | Haleakala | Pan-STARRS 1 | · | 1.5 km | MPC · JPL |
| 543888 | 2014 QH_{255} | — | December 22, 2008 | Kitt Peak | Spacewatch | · | 1.1 km | MPC · JPL |
| 543889 | 2014 QT_{255} | — | February 15, 2012 | Haleakala | Pan-STARRS 1 | · | 1.9 km | MPC · JPL |
| 543890 | 2014 QU_{256} | — | August 22, 2014 | Haleakala | Pan-STARRS 1 | · | 950 m | MPC · JPL |
| 543891 | 2014 QO_{257} | — | August 22, 2014 | Haleakala | Pan-STARRS 1 | · | 1.5 km | MPC · JPL |
| 543892 | 2014 QE_{258} | — | July 31, 2014 | Haleakala | Pan-STARRS 1 | PHO | 850 m | MPC · JPL |
| 543893 | 2014 QG_{260} | — | January 8, 2002 | Palomar | NEAT | · | 1.8 km | MPC · JPL |
| 543894 | 2014 QX_{263} | — | August 22, 2014 | Haleakala | Pan-STARRS 1 | EUN | 1.0 km | MPC · JPL |
| 543895 | 2014 QU_{265} | — | January 9, 2006 | Kitt Peak | Spacewatch | (2076) | 920 m | MPC · JPL |
| 543896 | 2014 QW_{265} | — | February 1, 2003 | Palomar | NEAT | · | 1.3 km | MPC · JPL |
| 543897 | 2014 QJ_{266} | — | July 27, 2001 | Haleakala | NEAT | (194) | 2.6 km | MPC · JPL |
| 543898 | 2014 QH_{268} | — | July 28, 2014 | Haleakala | Pan-STARRS 1 | · | 1.2 km | MPC · JPL |
| 543899 | 2014 QW_{270} | — | August 16, 2006 | Palomar | NEAT | HNS | 1.3 km | MPC · JPL |
| 543900 | 2014 QZ_{270} | — | December 28, 2011 | Mount Lemmon | Mount Lemmon Survey | ADE | 1.7 km | MPC · JPL |

== 543901–544000 ==
back to top

| Designation | | | Discovery | | | Properties | | Ref |
| Permanent | Provisional | Named after | Date | Site | Discoverer(s) | Category | Diam. | Ref |
|---|---|---|---|---|---|---|---|---|
| 543901 | 2014 QN_{271} | — | July 1, 2014 | Haleakala | Pan-STARRS 1 | · | 1.1 km | MPC · JPL |
| 543902 | 2014 QT_{274} | — | July 31, 2008 | La Sagra | OAM | · | 2.4 km | MPC · JPL |
| 543903 | 2014 QZ_{274} | — | August 23, 2014 | Haleakala | Pan-STARRS 1 | · | 1.4 km | MPC · JPL |
| 543904 | 2014 QT_{275} | — | November 25, 2005 | Mount Lemmon | Mount Lemmon Survey | KOR | 1.4 km | MPC · JPL |
| 543905 | 2014 QP_{276} | — | September 22, 2003 | Kitt Peak | Spacewatch | MAS | 630 m | MPC · JPL |
| 543906 | 2014 QE_{277} | — | July 7, 2014 | Haleakala | Pan-STARRS 1 | · | 1.3 km | MPC · JPL |
| 543907 | 2014 QJ_{278} | — | June 30, 2005 | Kitt Peak | Spacewatch | · | 1.3 km | MPC · JPL |
| 543908 | 2014 QS_{278} | — | September 12, 2007 | Kitt Peak | Spacewatch | NYS | 790 m | MPC · JPL |
| 543909 | 2014 QH_{280} | — | June 29, 2014 | Haleakala | Pan-STARRS 1 | V | 540 m | MPC · JPL |
| 543910 | 2014 QU_{285} | — | November 19, 2006 | Catalina | CSS | · | 1.7 km | MPC · JPL |
| 543911 | 2014 QA_{289} | — | August 25, 2014 | Haleakala | Pan-STARRS 1 | · | 990 m | MPC · JPL |
| 543912 | 2014 QQ_{289} | — | August 10, 2010 | Kitt Peak | Spacewatch | · | 2.0 km | MPC · JPL |
| 543913 | 2014 QW_{290} | — | December 29, 2011 | Mount Lemmon | Mount Lemmon Survey | · | 1.7 km | MPC · JPL |
| 543914 Tessedik | 2014 QW_{291} | Tessedik | March 15, 2012 | Piszkéstető | S. Kürti, K. Sárneczky | · | 960 m | MPC · JPL |
| 543915 | 2014 QA_{292} | — | August 25, 2014 | Haleakala | Pan-STARRS 1 | EUN | 1.1 km | MPC · JPL |
| 543916 | 2014 QO_{293} | — | November 1, 2006 | Mount Lemmon | Mount Lemmon Survey | · | 1.6 km | MPC · JPL |
| 543917 | 2014 QU_{293} | — | August 3, 2014 | Haleakala | Pan-STARRS 1 | · | 1.6 km | MPC · JPL |
| 543918 | 2014 QX_{296} | — | May 10, 2014 | Mount Lemmon | Mount Lemmon Survey | · | 1.7 km | MPC · JPL |
| 543919 | 2014 QC_{302} | — | July 31, 2014 | Haleakala | Pan-STARRS 1 | EUN | 850 m | MPC · JPL |
| 543920 | 2014 QH_{309} | — | March 31, 2009 | Catalina | CSS | · | 1.7 km | MPC · JPL |
| 543921 | 2014 QZ_{311} | — | August 3, 2014 | Haleakala | Pan-STARRS 1 | · | 1.2 km | MPC · JPL |
| 543922 | 2014 QT_{316} | — | January 27, 2012 | Mount Lemmon | Mount Lemmon Survey | · | 1.3 km | MPC · JPL |
| 543923 | 2014 QH_{320} | — | August 25, 2014 | Haleakala | Pan-STARRS 1 | · | 1.0 km | MPC · JPL |
| 543924 | 2014 QW_{322} | — | August 25, 2014 | Haleakala | Pan-STARRS 1 | · | 1.0 km | MPC · JPL |
| 543925 | 2014 QN_{323} | — | March 8, 2005 | Mount Lemmon | Mount Lemmon Survey | · | 1.1 km | MPC · JPL |
| 543926 | 2014 QQ_{324} | — | December 2, 2010 | Mount Lemmon | Mount Lemmon Survey | · | 1.8 km | MPC · JPL |
| 543927 | 2014 QV_{324} | — | March 30, 2008 | Kitt Peak | Spacewatch | · | 1.7 km | MPC · JPL |
| 543928 | 2014 QE_{325} | — | March 24, 2003 | Kitt Peak | Spacewatch | · | 1.8 km | MPC · JPL |
| 543929 | 2014 QO_{325} | — | April 7, 2003 | Kitt Peak | Spacewatch | · | 2.5 km | MPC · JPL |
| 543930 | 2014 QA_{326} | — | August 25, 2014 | Haleakala | Pan-STARRS 1 | · | 1.8 km | MPC · JPL |
| 543931 | 2014 QS_{327} | — | February 16, 2005 | La Silla | A. Boattini | V | 680 m | MPC · JPL |
| 543932 | 2014 QY_{328} | — | November 12, 2010 | Mount Lemmon | Mount Lemmon Survey | · | 1.0 km | MPC · JPL |
| 543933 | 2014 QT_{329} | — | August 25, 2014 | Haleakala | Pan-STARRS 1 | · | 1.2 km | MPC · JPL |
| 543934 | 2014 QE_{330} | — | May 3, 2008 | Kitt Peak | Spacewatch | · | 1.7 km | MPC · JPL |
| 543935 | 2014 QF_{332} | — | January 28, 2011 | Mount Lemmon | Mount Lemmon Survey | · | 2.2 km | MPC · JPL |
| 543936 | 2014 QY_{332} | — | February 28, 2012 | Haleakala | Pan-STARRS 1 | · | 1.6 km | MPC · JPL |
| 543937 | 2014 QR_{333} | — | August 25, 2014 | Haleakala | Pan-STARRS 1 | AGN | 1.2 km | MPC · JPL |
| 543938 | 2014 QE_{335} | — | August 25, 2014 | Haleakala | Pan-STARRS 1 | · | 1.3 km | MPC · JPL |
| 543939 | 2014 QG_{336} | — | October 10, 2005 | Catalina | CSS | GEF | 1.2 km | MPC · JPL |
| 543940 | 2014 QO_{336} | — | November 8, 2010 | Mount Lemmon | Mount Lemmon Survey | · | 1.1 km | MPC · JPL |
| 543941 | 2014 QK_{337} | — | January 19, 2012 | Haleakala | Pan-STARRS 1 | · | 1.3 km | MPC · JPL |
| 543942 | 2014 QR_{340} | — | October 20, 2011 | Mount Lemmon | Mount Lemmon Survey | · | 790 m | MPC · JPL |
| 543943 | 2014 QT_{343} | — | June 3, 2014 | Haleakala | Pan-STARRS 1 | · | 1.3 km | MPC · JPL |
| 543944 | 2014 QF_{344} | — | March 3, 2013 | Mount Lemmon | Mount Lemmon Survey | · | 890 m | MPC · JPL |
| 543945 | 2014 QR_{348} | — | July 5, 2010 | Kitt Peak | Spacewatch | MAS | 640 m | MPC · JPL |
| 543946 | 2014 QH_{353} | — | February 23, 2012 | Kitt Peak | Spacewatch | · | 2.7 km | MPC · JPL |
| 543947 | 2014 QG_{366} | — | October 23, 2006 | Mount Lemmon | Mount Lemmon Survey | (5) | 810 m | MPC · JPL |
| 543948 | 2014 QA_{367} | — | February 13, 2007 | Mount Lemmon | Mount Lemmon Survey | · | 2.1 km | MPC · JPL |
| 543949 | 2014 QS_{367} | — | November 6, 2010 | Mount Lemmon | Mount Lemmon Survey | (5) | 1.2 km | MPC · JPL |
| 543950 | 2014 QD_{368} | — | February 21, 2012 | Mount Lemmon | Mount Lemmon Survey | · | 1.5 km | MPC · JPL |
| 543951 | 2014 QE_{371} | — | August 27, 2014 | Haleakala | Pan-STARRS 1 | · | 800 m | MPC · JPL |
| 543952 | 2014 QV_{373} | — | January 14, 2011 | Kitt Peak | Spacewatch | · | 2.6 km | MPC · JPL |
| 543953 | 2014 QS_{383} | — | October 17, 2010 | Mount Lemmon | Mount Lemmon Survey | · | 1.9 km | MPC · JPL |
| 543954 | 2014 QB_{386} | — | September 20, 2008 | Mount Lemmon | Mount Lemmon Survey | · | 2.9 km | MPC · JPL |
| 543955 | 2014 QJ_{386} | — | January 19, 2012 | Haleakala | Pan-STARRS 1 | · | 2.7 km | MPC · JPL |
| 543956 | 2014 QQ_{387} | — | April 1, 2003 | Kitt Peak | Deep Ecliptic Survey | · | 760 m | MPC · JPL |
| 543957 | 2014 QF_{391} | — | July 23, 2001 | Palomar | NEAT | · | 1.6 km | MPC · JPL |
| 543958 | 2014 QP_{400} | — | August 21, 2006 | Kitt Peak | Spacewatch | · | 720 m | MPC · JPL |
| 543959 | 2014 QF_{401} | — | October 23, 2006 | Mount Lemmon | Mount Lemmon Survey | · | 1.3 km | MPC · JPL |
| 543960 | 2014 QH_{405} | — | June 14, 2010 | Mount Lemmon | Mount Lemmon Survey | · | 1.3 km | MPC · JPL |
| 543961 | 2014 QV_{407} | — | September 16, 2006 | Catalina | CSS | · | 1.8 km | MPC · JPL |
| 543962 | 2014 QO_{413} | — | February 25, 2006 | Mount Lemmon | Mount Lemmon Survey | · | 810 m | MPC · JPL |
| 543963 | 2014 QE_{414} | — | August 10, 2007 | Kitt Peak | Spacewatch | · | 660 m | MPC · JPL |
| 543964 | 2014 QN_{423} | — | January 17, 2007 | Kitt Peak | Spacewatch | · | 2.2 km | MPC · JPL |
| 543965 | 2014 QK_{425} | — | August 21, 2006 | Kitt Peak | Spacewatch | MAR | 710 m | MPC · JPL |
| 543966 | 2014 QQ_{426} | — | November 19, 2007 | Mount Lemmon | Mount Lemmon Survey | · | 1.7 km | MPC · JPL |
| 543967 | 2014 QW_{431} | — | August 30, 2005 | Kitt Peak | Spacewatch | · | 1.4 km | MPC · JPL |
| 543968 | 2014 QG_{436} | — | August 30, 2014 | Catalina | CSS | · | 1.8 km | MPC · JPL |
| 543969 | 2014 QE_{438} | — | January 28, 2007 | Mount Lemmon | Mount Lemmon Survey | · | 1.5 km | MPC · JPL |
| 543970 | 2014 QQ_{440} | — | September 17, 2003 | Kitt Peak | Spacewatch | · | 1.4 km | MPC · JPL |
| 543971 | 2014 QV_{440} | — | April 11, 2013 | Siding Spring | SSS | · | 1.8 km | MPC · JPL |
| 543972 | 2014 QX_{440} | — | April 20, 2013 | Mount Lemmon | Mount Lemmon Survey | · | 2.9 km | MPC · JPL |
| 543973 | 2014 QC_{441} | — | July 7, 2014 | Haleakala | Pan-STARRS 1 | MAS | 750 m | MPC · JPL |
| 543974 | 2014 QE_{441} | — | February 24, 2012 | Haleakala | Pan-STARRS 1 | · | 2.1 km | MPC · JPL |
| 543975 | 2014 QF_{441} | — | October 27, 2006 | Catalina | CSS | · | 1.4 km | MPC · JPL |
| 543976 | 2014 QQ_{448} | — | October 27, 2005 | Catalina | CSS | (18466) | 2.0 km | MPC · JPL |
| 543977 | 2014 QA_{449} | — | January 31, 2006 | Mount Lemmon | Mount Lemmon Survey | BRA | 1.5 km | MPC · JPL |
| 543978 | 2014 QD_{449} | — | February 2, 2006 | Mount Lemmon | Mount Lemmon Survey | · | 2.7 km | MPC · JPL |
| 543979 | 2014 QL_{449} | — | August 20, 2014 | Haleakala | Pan-STARRS 1 | · | 1.5 km | MPC · JPL |
| 543980 | 2014 QQ_{449} | — | December 13, 2006 | Mount Lemmon | Mount Lemmon Survey | · | 1.5 km | MPC · JPL |
| 543981 | 2014 QR_{449} | — | August 23, 2014 | Haleakala | Pan-STARRS 1 | · | 1.9 km | MPC · JPL |
| 543982 | 2014 QS_{449} | — | April 27, 2012 | Haleakala | Pan-STARRS 1 | · | 1.9 km | MPC · JPL |
| 543983 | 2014 QU_{449} | — | October 22, 2006 | Catalina | CSS | · | 1.0 km | MPC · JPL |
| 543984 | 2014 QV_{449} | — | July 27, 2009 | Kitt Peak | Spacewatch | · | 1.8 km | MPC · JPL |
| 543985 | 2014 QW_{449} | — | August 25, 2014 | Haleakala | Pan-STARRS 1 | · | 1.1 km | MPC · JPL |
| 543986 | 2014 QE_{450} | — | November 13, 2006 | Catalina | CSS | KON | 2.5 km | MPC · JPL |
| 543987 | 2014 QF_{450} | — | March 12, 2007 | Mount Lemmon | Mount Lemmon Survey | · | 1.8 km | MPC · JPL |
| 543988 | 2014 QZ_{451} | — | September 18, 2006 | Kitt Peak | Spacewatch | (5) | 1.1 km | MPC · JPL |
| 543989 | 2014 QC_{452} | — | March 31, 2008 | Mount Lemmon | Mount Lemmon Survey | · | 1.8 km | MPC · JPL |
| 543990 | 2014 QL_{452} | — | April 12, 2012 | Haleakala | Pan-STARRS 1 | · | 1.8 km | MPC · JPL |
| 543991 | 2014 QM_{452} | — | November 8, 2010 | Kitt Peak | Spacewatch | · | 1.4 km | MPC · JPL |
| 543992 | 2014 QF_{457} | — | October 12, 2006 | Palomar | NEAT | EUN | 890 m | MPC · JPL |
| 543993 | 2014 QV_{457} | — | October 13, 2010 | Mount Lemmon | Mount Lemmon Survey | · | 1.4 km | MPC · JPL |
| 543994 | 2014 QH_{458} | — | August 18, 2014 | Haleakala | Pan-STARRS 1 | DOR | 1.8 km | MPC · JPL |
| 543995 | 2014 QP_{460} | — | August 20, 2014 | Haleakala | Pan-STARRS 1 | · | 980 m | MPC · JPL |
| 543996 | 2014 QV_{461} | — | August 20, 2014 | Haleakala | Pan-STARRS 1 | · | 1.8 km | MPC · JPL |
| 543997 | 2014 QQ_{463} | — | April 13, 2013 | Haleakala | Pan-STARRS 1 | GEF | 1.1 km | MPC · JPL |
| 543998 | 2014 QR_{464} | — | August 23, 2014 | Haleakala | Pan-STARRS 1 | · | 1.5 km | MPC · JPL |
| 543999 | 2014 QQ_{470} | — | December 3, 2010 | Mount Lemmon | Mount Lemmon Survey | MRX | 960 m | MPC · JPL |
| 544000 | 2014 QY_{471} | — | August 30, 2014 | Haleakala | Pan-STARRS 1 | · | 1.2 km | MPC · JPL |

back to top

== Meaning of names ==
As minor planet discoveries are confirmed, they are given a permanent number by the IAU's Minor Planet Center (MPC), and the discoverers can then submit names for them, following the IAU's naming conventions. The list below concerns those minor planets in the specified number-range that have received names, and explains the meanings of those names.

Official naming citations of newly named small Solar System bodies are approved and published in a bulletin by IAU's Working Group for Small Bodies Nomenclature (WGSBN). Before May 2021, citations were published in MPC's Minor Planet Circulars for many decades. Recent citations can also be found on the JPL Small-Body Database (SBDB). Until his death in 2016, German astronomer Lutz D. Schmadel compiled these citations into the Dictionary of Minor Planet Names (DMP) and regularly updated the collection.

Based on Paul Herget's The Names of the Minor Planets, Schmadel also researched the unclear origin of numerous asteroids, most of which had been named prior to World War II. This article incorporates text from this source, which is in the public domain: SBDB New namings may only be added to this list below after official publication as the preannouncement of names is condemned. The WGSBN publishes a comprehensive guideline for the naming rules of non-cometary small Solar System bodies.

| Named minor planet | Provisional | This minor planet was named for... | Ref · Catalog |
|---|---|---|---|
| 543018 ROTAT | 2013 RF_{18} | Named for the Remote Observatory Theoretical Astrophysics Tübingen at Observatoire de Haute-Provence. The main telescope is a 0.60-m Newtonian and the discovery instrument of this minor planet. The observatory is a member of the Foundation Interactive Astronomy and Astrophysics. | IAU · 543018 |
| 543060 Liefke | 2013 RQ_{95} | Carolin Liefke (born 1981) is an astronomer and astronomy educator at Haus der Astronomie in Heidelberg. She has used the telescope that was used to discover this asteroid in educational activities. | IAU · 543060 |
| 543061 Ruthsager | 2013 RS_{97} | Ruth Sager, American geneticist. | IAU · 543061 |
| 543081 Albertducrocq | 2013 SC_{26} | Albert Ducrocq (1921–2001), a French cybernetic scientist, journalist and essayist. | IAU · 543081 |
| 543198 Rastislavmráz | 2013 TT_{115} | Rastislav Mráz shihan (1897–1968) is a former Slovakian Karate champion. | IAU · 543198 |
| 543229 Matiganis | 2013 UC_{6} | Matiganis is an ancient name for the city of Shumen, Bulgaria, meaning "Shining Eye" in middle Greek. | IAU · 543229 |
| 543302 Hamvasbéla | 2013 XP_{7} | Béla Hamvas (1897–1968) was a Hungarian writer, philosopher, and social critic. | IAU · 543302 |
| 543315 Asmakhammari | 2013 YY_{14} | Asma Khammari-Steinhausser (born 1982) is a French promoter of scientific outreach. | JPL · 543315 |
| 543581 Laurenrubyjane | 2014 NL_{64} | Lauren Ruby Jane Forward (born 2006) is the granddaughter of British amateur astronomer Norman Falla, who discovered this minor planet. | IAU · 543581 |
| 543698 Miromesaroš | 2014 OF_{309} | Miroslav "Miro" Mesaroš (born 1967), a Slovak mathematics and physics teacher and popularizer of astronomy. | IAU · 543698 |
| 543914 Tessedik | 2014 QW_{291} | Sámuel Tessedik (1742–1820) was a Slovak Lutheran pastor, school founder, teacher and economic writer. | IAU · 543914 |
