= List of minor planets: 542001–543000 =

The following is a partial list of minor planets, running from minor-planet number 542001 through 543000, inclusive. The primary data for this and other partial lists is based on JPL's "Small-Body Orbital Elements" and data available from the Minor Planet Center. Critical list information is also provided by the MPC, unless otherwise specified from Lowell Observatory. A detailed description of the table's columns and additional sources are given on the main page including a complete list of every page in this series, and a statistical break-up on the dynamical classification of minor planets.

Also see the summary list of all named bodies in numerical and alphabetical order, and the corresponding naming citations for the number range of this particular list. New namings may only be added to this list after official publication, as the preannouncement of names is condemned by the Working Group for Small Bodies Nomenclature of the International Astronomical Union.

Near-Earth obj.	MBA (inner)	MBA (outer)	Centaur
Mars-crosser	MBA (middle)	Jupiter trojan	Trans-Neptunian obj.
Unclassified

== 542001–542100 ==
Designation			Discovery			Properties		Ref
Permanent	Provisional	Named after	Date	Site	Discoverer(s)	Category	Diam.	Ref
542001	2012 HC_{22}	—	April 20, 2012	Haleakala	Pan-STARRS 1	TIR	3.3 km	MPC · JPL
542002	2012 HE_{30}	—	October 8, 2008	Catalina	CSS	·	2.9 km	MPC · JPL
542003	2012 HO_{33}	—	April 15, 2012	Haleakala	Pan-STARRS 1	·	1.2 km	MPC · JPL
542004	2012 HD_{35}	—	May 25, 2003	Kitt Peak	Spacewatch	·	2.6 km	MPC · JPL
542005	2012 HA_{45}	—	October 27, 2008	Kitt Peak	Spacewatch	·	2.8 km	MPC · JPL
542006	2012 HZ_{46}	—	April 21, 2012	Kitt Peak	Spacewatch	THB	3.2 km	MPC · JPL
542007	2012 HD_{47}	—	January 1, 2012	Mount Lemmon	Mount Lemmon Survey	·	3.2 km	MPC · JPL
542008	2012 HF_{47}	—	January 31, 2011	Bergisch Gladbach	W. Bickel	·	3.6 km	MPC · JPL
542009	2012 HV_{47}	—	April 21, 2012	Haleakala	Pan-STARRS 1	·	2.1 km	MPC · JPL
542010	2012 HF_{51}	—	April 20, 2012	Kitt Peak	Spacewatch	·	2.7 km	MPC · JPL
542011	2012 HY_{53}	—	December 28, 2005	Kitt Peak	Spacewatch	·	2.0 km	MPC · JPL
542012	2012 HD_{54}	—	January 14, 2011	Mount Lemmon	Mount Lemmon Survey	·	1.9 km	MPC · JPL
542013	2012 HN_{70}	—	August 27, 2006	Kitt Peak	Spacewatch	·	570 m	MPC · JPL
542014	2012 HC_{77}	—	April 20, 2012	Kitt Peak	Spacewatch	THB	2.6 km	MPC · JPL
542015	2012 HK_{82}	—	October 6, 2002	Palomar	NEAT	·	5.1 km	MPC · JPL
542016	2012 HN_{85}	—	November 23, 2009	Mount Lemmon	Mount Lemmon Survey	·	1.9 km	MPC · JPL
542017	2012 HQ_{85}	—	April 25, 2007	Mount Lemmon	Mount Lemmon Survey	·	1.8 km	MPC · JPL
542018	2012 HV_{85}	—	October 26, 2008	Mount Lemmon	Mount Lemmon Survey	·	3.1 km	MPC · JPL
542019	2012 HA_{86}	—	April 20, 2012	Kitt Peak	Spacewatch	·	2.1 km	MPC · JPL
542020	2012 HL_{86}	—	April 20, 2012	Mount Lemmon	Mount Lemmon Survey	·	2.3 km	MPC · JPL
542021	2012 JA_{3}	—	April 11, 2007	Mount Lemmon	Mount Lemmon Survey	KOR	1.7 km	MPC · JPL
542022	2012 JH_{3}	—	May 12, 2012	Siding Spring	SSS	·	1.5 km	MPC · JPL
542023	2012 JG_{6}	—	May 12, 2012	Mount Lemmon	Mount Lemmon Survey	·	1.9 km	MPC · JPL
542024	2012 JR_{15}	—	November 11, 2010	Mount Lemmon	Mount Lemmon Survey	·	1.6 km	MPC · JPL
542025	2012 JD_{18}	—	September 3, 2008	Kitt Peak	Spacewatch	·	1.5 km	MPC · JPL
542026 Kaszásattila	2012 JL_{19}	Kaszásattila	March 24, 2011	Piszkéstető	K. Sárneczky, S. Kürti	EOS	2.0 km	MPC · JPL
542027	2012 JF_{21}	—	May 1, 2012	Siding Spring	SSS	·	2.7 km	MPC · JPL
542028	2012 JY_{35}	—	July 3, 2005	Mount Lemmon	Mount Lemmon Survey	V	540 m	MPC · JPL
542029	2012 JG_{36}	—	May 15, 2012	Haleakala	Pan-STARRS 1	(18466)	2.9 km	MPC · JPL
542030	2012 JH_{36}	—	October 30, 2008	Kitt Peak	Spacewatch	LIX	3.4 km	MPC · JPL
542031	2012 JO_{37}	—	February 8, 2002	Kitt Peak	Deep Ecliptic Survey	·	860 m	MPC · JPL
542032	2012 JZ_{40}	—	October 29, 2008	Mount Lemmon	Mount Lemmon Survey	·	3.8 km	MPC · JPL
542033	2012 JS_{41}	—	April 29, 2012	Mount Lemmon	Mount Lemmon Survey	·	1.8 km	MPC · JPL
542034	2012 JD_{47}	—	May 14, 2012	Kitt Peak	Spacewatch	HNS	1.1 km	MPC · JPL
542035	2012 JC_{48}	—	October 16, 2002	Palomar	NEAT	·	3.3 km	MPC · JPL
542036	2012 JG_{52}	—	May 14, 2012	Haleakala	Pan-STARRS 1	·	1.8 km	MPC · JPL
542037	2012 JW_{53}	—	September 6, 2008	Kitt Peak	Spacewatch	·	2.2 km	MPC · JPL
542038	2012 JC_{60}	—	September 23, 2008	Mount Lemmon	Mount Lemmon Survey	·	2.3 km	MPC · JPL
542039	2012 JE_{60}	—	October 1, 2008	Catalina	CSS	·	3.6 km	MPC · JPL
542040	2012 JM_{60}	—	April 24, 2012	Mount Lemmon	Mount Lemmon Survey	·	3.2 km	MPC · JPL
542041	2012 JV_{67}	—	May 15, 2012	Haleakala	Pan-STARRS 1	·	2.9 km	MPC · JPL
542042	2012 KN_{3}	—	May 17, 2012	Mount Lemmon	Mount Lemmon Survey	·	2.3 km	MPC · JPL
542043	2012 KR_{3}	—	January 12, 2011	Kitt Peak	Spacewatch	·	1.6 km	MPC · JPL
542044	2012 KH_{4}	—	September 28, 2003	Haleakala	NEAT	·	550 m	MPC · JPL
542045	2012 KA_{12}	—	March 23, 2012	Mount Lemmon	Mount Lemmon Survey	·	2.4 km	MPC · JPL
542046	2012 KH_{12}	—	December 29, 2003	Kitt Peak	Spacewatch	T_{j} (2.97) · EUP	4.7 km	MPC · JPL
542047	2012 KJ_{14}	—	April 23, 2012	Haleakala	Pan-STARRS 1	·	3.5 km	MPC · JPL
542048	2012 KC_{15}	—	May 15, 2012	Haleakala	Pan-STARRS 1	·	2.2 km	MPC · JPL
542049	2012 KN_{16}	—	May 20, 2012	Mount Lemmon	Mount Lemmon Survey	·	2.3 km	MPC · JPL
542050	2012 KP_{18}	—	January 13, 2011	Kitt Peak	Spacewatch	·	3.1 km	MPC · JPL
542051	2012 KV_{18}	—	March 23, 2012	Mount Lemmon	Mount Lemmon Survey	·	3.2 km	MPC · JPL
542052	2012 KA_{22}	—	May 17, 2012	Mount Lemmon	Mount Lemmon Survey	·	2.2 km	MPC · JPL
542053	2012 KK_{24}	—	October 7, 2008	Mount Lemmon	Mount Lemmon Survey	LIX	3.3 km	MPC · JPL
542054	2012 KF_{27}	—	May 16, 2012	Mount Lemmon	Mount Lemmon Survey	·	2.1 km	MPC · JPL
542055	2012 KY_{28}	—	May 1, 2012	Mount Lemmon	Mount Lemmon Survey	·	1.8 km	MPC · JPL
542056	2012 KK_{29}	—	April 27, 2012	Haleakala	Pan-STARRS 1	·	1.8 km	MPC · JPL
542057	2012 KB_{32}	—	May 1, 2012	Mount Lemmon	Mount Lemmon Survey	·	1.2 km	MPC · JPL
542058	2012 KS_{32}	—	November 4, 2004	Kitt Peak	Spacewatch	EOS	2.0 km	MPC · JPL
542059	2012 KT_{40}	—	February 2, 2006	Mauna Kea	P. A. Wiegert	·	1.5 km	MPC · JPL
542060	2012 KB_{42}	—	May 21, 2012	Haleakala	Pan-STARRS 1	ARM	2.7 km	MPC · JPL
542061	2012 KD_{44}	—	November 24, 2008	Kitt Peak	Spacewatch	·	3.2 km	MPC · JPL
542062	2012 KS_{46}	—	September 12, 2002	Palomar	NEAT	·	4.1 km	MPC · JPL
542063	2012 KG_{47}	—	March 5, 2011	Catalina	CSS	·	3.6 km	MPC · JPL
542064	2012 KR_{47}	—	May 20, 2012	Kitt Peak	Spacewatch	·	1.3 km	MPC · JPL
542065	2012 KU_{48}	—	November 20, 2008	Kitt Peak	Spacewatch	·	2.7 km	MPC · JPL
542066	2012 KA_{50}	—	May 31, 2012	Mount Lemmon	Mount Lemmon Survey	·	2.3 km	MPC · JPL
542067	2012 KC_{52}	—	November 1, 2008	Mount Lemmon	Mount Lemmon Survey	T_{j} (2.98)	3.2 km	MPC · JPL
542068	2012 KX_{52}	—	May 21, 2012	Haleakala	Pan-STARRS 1	·	660 m	MPC · JPL
542069	2012 LK_{7}	—	April 25, 2012	Mount Lemmon	Mount Lemmon Survey	·	630 m	MPC · JPL
542070	2012 LR_{7}	—	September 24, 2008	Kitt Peak	Spacewatch	TIR	3.4 km	MPC · JPL
542071	2012 LG_{10}	—	September 28, 2008	Mount Lemmon	Mount Lemmon Survey	·	3.0 km	MPC · JPL
542072	2012 LH_{10}	—	June 15, 2012	Mount Lemmon	M. Ory	·	2.1 km	MPC · JPL
542073	2012 LM_{11}	—	October 28, 2003	Haleakala	NEAT	·	2.5 km	MPC · JPL
542074	2012 LR_{18}	—	May 27, 2012	Mount Lemmon	Mount Lemmon Survey	·	2.3 km	MPC · JPL
542075	2012 LS_{19}	—	June 9, 2012	Mount Lemmon	Mount Lemmon Survey	·	2.9 km	MPC · JPL
542076	2012 LV_{20}	—	August 19, 2006	Kitt Peak	Spacewatch	·	610 m	MPC · JPL
542077	2012 LB_{21}	—	December 5, 2010	Mount Lemmon	Mount Lemmon Survey	TIR	2.6 km	MPC · JPL
542078	2012 LO_{21}	—	April 8, 2006	Kitt Peak	Spacewatch	·	2.9 km	MPC · JPL
542079	2012 LQ_{21}	—	June 11, 2012	Haleakala	Pan-STARRS 1	·	1.7 km	MPC · JPL
542080	2012 LF_{23}	—	May 21, 2012	Haleakala	Pan-STARRS 1	·	2.1 km	MPC · JPL
542081	2012 LW_{23}	—	September 25, 2008	Mount Lemmon	Mount Lemmon Survey	·	2.2 km	MPC · JPL
542082	2012 MV_{15}	—	July 30, 1995	Kitt Peak	Spacewatch	·	2.4 km	MPC · JPL
542083	2012 MF_{16}	—	May 22, 2001	Anderson Mesa	LONEOS	TIR	3.8 km	MPC · JPL
542084 Olegverkhodanov	2012 NH	Olegverkhodanov	July 12, 2012	Zelenchukskaya Stn	T. V. Krjačko, Satovski, B.	T_{j} (2.99)	3.7 km	MPC · JPL
542085	2012 NW	—	June 15, 2012	Mount Lemmon	Mount Lemmon Survey	·	680 m	MPC · JPL
542086	2012 OF_{2}	—	May 29, 2012	Mount Lemmon	Mount Lemmon Survey	TIR	2.8 km	MPC · JPL
542087	2012 PQ_{19}	—	February 26, 2009	Kitt Peak	Spacewatch	·	3.9 km	MPC · JPL
542088	2012 QH_{52}	—	February 8, 2008	Kitt Peak	Spacewatch	·	860 m	MPC · JPL
542089	2012 RY_{6}	—	June 13, 2005	Mount Lemmon	Mount Lemmon Survey	·	550 m	MPC · JPL
542090	2012 RF_{11}	—	August 22, 2012	Westfield	International Astronomical Search Collaboration	·	2.7 km	MPC · JPL
542091	2012 RM_{11}	—	December 19, 2009	Mount Lemmon	Mount Lemmon Survey	·	790 m	MPC · JPL
542092	2012 RB_{14}	—	September 14, 2012	ISON-Kislovodsk	Nevski, V., A. Novichonok	·	3.4 km	MPC · JPL
542093	2012 RD_{20}	—	February 14, 2010	Mount Lemmon	Mount Lemmon Survey	EOS	2.2 km	MPC · JPL
542094	2012 RN_{26}	—	October 24, 2009	Kitt Peak	Spacewatch	·	700 m	MPC · JPL
542095	2012 RG_{30}	—	October 8, 2007	Catalina	CSS	·	3.2 km	MPC · JPL
542096	2012 RC_{39}	—	September 18, 2012	Mount Lemmon	Mount Lemmon Survey	VER	2.9 km	MPC · JPL
542097	2012 RU_{41}	—	February 14, 2004	Kitt Peak	Spacewatch	·	3.1 km	MPC · JPL
542098	2012 SV_{19}	—	January 10, 2007	Mount Lemmon	Mount Lemmon Survey	·	620 m	MPC · JPL
542099	2012 SC_{40}	—	May 11, 2005	Palomar	NEAT	·	620 m	MPC · JPL
542100	2012 SD_{45}	—	September 17, 2006	Catalina	CSS	·	4.6 km	MPC · JPL

== 542101–542200 ==
back to top

Designation			Discovery			Properties		Ref
Permanent	Provisional	Named after	Date	Site	Discoverer(s)	Category	Diam.	Ref
542101	2012 SC_{47}	—	February 2, 2009	Kitt Peak	Spacewatch	·	2.7 km	MPC · JPL
542102	2012 TB	—	April 11, 2008	Mount Lemmon	Mount Lemmon Survey	·	740 m	MPC · JPL
542103	2012 TV_{10}	—	April 1, 2003	Cerro Tololo	Deep Lens Survey	CYB	4.3 km	MPC · JPL
542104	2012 TK_{53}	—	September 5, 2005	Bergisch Gladbach	W. Bickel	·	670 m	MPC · JPL
542105	2012 TK_{54}	—	October 30, 2005	Mount Lemmon	Mount Lemmon Survey	·	820 m	MPC · JPL
542106	2012 TK_{57}	—	October 11, 2002	Palomar	NEAT	·	510 m	MPC · JPL
542107	2012 TL_{68}	—	November 18, 2009	Kitt Peak	Spacewatch	·	700 m	MPC · JPL
542108	2012 TM_{300}	—	October 12, 2012	Cerro Burek	Burek, Cerro	VER	2.2 km	MPC · JPL
542109	2012 UM_{74}	—	April 1, 2011	Mount Lemmon	Mount Lemmon Survey	·	780 m	MPC · JPL
542110	2012 UV_{92}	—	January 17, 2007	Kitt Peak	Spacewatch	·	850 m	MPC · JPL
542111	2012 UQ_{150}	—	October 8, 2012	Kitt Peak	Spacewatch	NYS	910 m	MPC · JPL
542112	2012 UJ_{162}	—	August 10, 2001	Palomar	NEAT	·	850 m	MPC · JPL
542113	2012 US_{173}	—	October 15, 2012	Mount Lemmon	Mount Lemmon Survey	V	520 m	MPC · JPL
542114	2012 UR_{174}	—	October 15, 2012	Mount Lemmon	Mount Lemmon Survey	·	960 m	MPC · JPL
542115	2012 UJ_{184}	—	October 8, 2012	Mount Lemmon	Mount Lemmon Survey	·	620 m	MPC · JPL
542116	2012 VN_{4}	—	September 19, 1995	Kitt Peak	Spacewatch	·	2.5 km	MPC · JPL
542117	2012 VB_{43}	—	November 5, 2005	Anderson Mesa	LONEOS	·	650 m	MPC · JPL
542118	2012 VD_{56}	—	April 19, 2007	Kitt Peak	Spacewatch	·	1.0 km	MPC · JPL
542119	2012 VQ_{75}	—	October 15, 2001	Palomar	NEAT	·	800 m	MPC · JPL
542120	2012 VC_{76}	—	July 20, 2004	Siding Spring	SSS	PHO	1.1 km	MPC · JPL
542121	2012 VC_{88}	—	January 23, 2006	Kitt Peak	Spacewatch	·	1.0 km	MPC · JPL
542122	2012 VF_{93}	—	November 26, 2005	Kitt Peak	Spacewatch	·	670 m	MPC · JPL
542123	2012 VE_{94}	—	November 13, 2012	ESA OGS	ESA OGS	·	710 m	MPC · JPL
542124	2012 VQ_{103}	—	October 22, 2005	Kitt Peak	Spacewatch	·	760 m	MPC · JPL
542125	2012 VZ_{105}	—	October 25, 2005	Mount Lemmon	Mount Lemmon Survey	·	400 m	MPC · JPL
542126	2012 VA_{108}	—	October 19, 2001	Anderson Mesa	LONEOS	·	1.0 km	MPC · JPL
542127	2012 WP_{8}	—	November 17, 2012	Kitt Peak	Spacewatch	·	880 m	MPC · JPL
542128	2012 WG_{9}	—	November 28, 2005	Mount Lemmon	Mount Lemmon Survey	NYS	740 m	MPC · JPL
542129	2012 WD_{22}	—	September 23, 2008	Mount Lemmon	Mount Lemmon Survey	·	960 m	MPC · JPL
542130	2012 WU_{28}	—	November 17, 2001	Kitt Peak	Spacewatch	·	1.3 km	MPC · JPL
542131	2012 WD_{30}	—	November 17, 2012	Mount Lemmon	Mount Lemmon Survey	·	640 m	MPC · JPL
542132	2012 XF_{6}	—	September 24, 2008	Mount Lemmon	Mount Lemmon Survey	·	880 m	MPC · JPL
542133	2012 XN_{7}	—	October 3, 2005	Catalina	CSS	·	790 m	MPC · JPL
542134	2012 XK_{10}	—	November 25, 2012	Kitt Peak	Spacewatch	·	980 m	MPC · JPL
542135	2012 XD_{15}	—	December 18, 2009	Kitt Peak	Spacewatch	·	810 m	MPC · JPL
542136	2012 XR_{19}	—	December 30, 2005	Kitt Peak	Spacewatch	MAS	590 m	MPC · JPL
542137	2012 XK_{21}	—	November 4, 2012	Kitt Peak	Spacewatch	·	800 m	MPC · JPL
542138	2012 XZ_{24}	—	October 10, 2008	Mount Lemmon	Mount Lemmon Survey	·	1.1 km	MPC · JPL
542139	2012 XW_{26}	—	September 23, 2008	Mount Lemmon	Mount Lemmon Survey	·	890 m	MPC · JPL
542140	2012 XJ_{30}	—	September 23, 2008	Kitt Peak	Spacewatch	·	1.1 km	MPC · JPL
542141	2012 XE_{39}	—	April 28, 2011	Kitt Peak	Spacewatch	·	840 m	MPC · JPL
542142	2012 XS_{48}	—	December 10, 2005	Kitt Peak	Spacewatch	·	780 m	MPC · JPL
542143	2012 XS_{54}	—	December 8, 2012	Nogales	M. Schwartz, P. R. Holvorcem	·	930 m	MPC · JPL
542144	2012 XH_{62}	—	February 22, 2003	Palomar	NEAT	·	860 m	MPC · JPL
542145	2012 XS_{62}	—	October 22, 2005	Palomar	NEAT	·	660 m	MPC · JPL
542146	2012 XO_{68}	—	February 17, 2010	Mount Lemmon	Mount Lemmon Survey	·	680 m	MPC · JPL
542147	2012 XO_{73}	—	January 8, 2010	Kitt Peak	Spacewatch	MAS	750 m	MPC · JPL
542148	2012 XR_{78}	—	October 6, 2008	Mount Lemmon	Mount Lemmon Survey	CLA	1.3 km	MPC · JPL
542149	2012 XK_{87}	—	November 12, 2012	Mount Lemmon	Mount Lemmon Survey	·	740 m	MPC · JPL
542150	2012 XT_{87}	—	November 12, 2012	Mount Lemmon	Mount Lemmon Survey	·	680 m	MPC · JPL
542151	2012 XU_{89}	—	November 10, 2005	Mount Lemmon	Mount Lemmon Survey	·	840 m	MPC · JPL
542152	2012 XA_{102}	—	December 5, 2012	Mount Lemmon	Mount Lemmon Survey	V	570 m	MPC · JPL
542153	2012 XB_{103}	—	October 30, 2005	Mount Lemmon	Mount Lemmon Survey	·	710 m	MPC · JPL
542154	2012 XB_{114}	—	November 7, 2012	Mount Lemmon	Mount Lemmon Survey	·	630 m	MPC · JPL
542155	2012 XK_{114}	—	March 20, 2007	Kitt Peak	Spacewatch	V	720 m	MPC · JPL
542156	2012 XG_{125}	—	June 3, 2011	Catalina	CSS	·	840 m	MPC · JPL
542157	2012 XB_{139}	—	December 6, 2012	Mount Lemmon	Mount Lemmon Survey	·	850 m	MPC · JPL
542158	2012 XE_{142}	—	November 7, 2012	Mount Lemmon	Mount Lemmon Survey	·	1.1 km	MPC · JPL
542159	2012 XP_{150}	—	September 20, 2008	Mount Lemmon	Mount Lemmon Survey	·	930 m	MPC · JPL
542160	2012 XC_{153}	—	October 3, 2011	XuYi	PMO NEO Survey Program	T_{j} (2.98) · 3:2 · (6124)	4.5 km	MPC · JPL
542161	2012 XL_{159}	—	December 3, 2012	Mount Lemmon	Mount Lemmon Survey	·	600 m	MPC · JPL
542162	2012 YK_{3}	—	November 20, 2012	Mount Lemmon	Mount Lemmon Survey	H	510 m	MPC · JPL
542163	2012 YO_{10}	—	December 2, 2008	Mount Lemmon	Mount Lemmon Survey	·	1.2 km	MPC · JPL
542164	2013 AO	—	August 1, 2011	Haleakala	Pan-STARRS 1	·	1.1 km	MPC · JPL
542165	2013 AP_{1}	—	August 22, 2003	Palomar	NEAT	·	2.1 km	MPC · JPL
542166	2013 AY_{5}	—	November 30, 2008	Kitt Peak	Spacewatch	·	1.2 km	MPC · JPL
542167	2013 AZ_{6}	—	December 6, 2007	Mount Lemmon	Mount Lemmon Survey	·	3.0 km	MPC · JPL
542168	2013 AR_{7}	—	July 26, 2001	Kitt Peak	Spacewatch	·	3.1 km	MPC · JPL
542169	2013 AD_{8}	—	November 23, 2011	Kitt Peak	Spacewatch	L4 · ERY	10 km	MPC · JPL
542170	2013 AR_{8}	—	June 4, 2002	Palomar	NEAT	MAR	1.2 km	MPC · JPL
542171	2013 AG_{15}	—	October 7, 2012	Oukaïmeden	C. Rinner	RAF	1.1 km	MPC · JPL
542172	2013 AN_{15}	—	December 9, 2012	Kitt Peak	Spacewatch	·	2.2 km	MPC · JPL
542173	2013 AE_{16}	—	November 29, 2003	Kitt Peak	Spacewatch	·	1.7 km	MPC · JPL
542174	2013 AG_{18}	—	August 1, 2001	Palomar	NEAT	·	1 km	MPC · JPL
542175	2013 AG_{19}	—	September 11, 2007	Mount Lemmon	Mount Lemmon Survey	·	1.3 km	MPC · JPL
542176	2013 AP_{21}	—	August 23, 2006	Palomar	NEAT	AGN	1.4 km	MPC · JPL
542177	2013 AX_{21}	—	November 24, 2008	Calvin-Rehoboth	L. A. Molnar	·	1.6 km	MPC · JPL
542178	2013 AD_{26}	—	October 7, 2008	Mount Lemmon	Mount Lemmon Survey	·	1.1 km	MPC · JPL
542179	2013 AG_{28}	—	December 2, 2005	Kitt Peak	Wasserman, L. H., Millis, R. L.	·	1.1 km	MPC · JPL
542180	2013 AS_{29}	—	January 7, 2013	Oukaïmeden	M. Ory	·	730 m	MPC · JPL
542181	2013 AK_{30}	—	September 28, 2008	Mount Lemmon	Mount Lemmon Survey	V	600 m	MPC · JPL
542182	2013 AX_{30}	—	September 13, 2002	Palomar	NEAT	·	2.2 km	MPC · JPL
542183	2013 AJ_{32}	—	December 22, 2005	Kitt Peak	Spacewatch	NYS	670 m	MPC · JPL
542184	2013 AB_{34}	—	January 22, 2006	Mount Lemmon	Mount Lemmon Survey	·	1.3 km	MPC · JPL
542185	2013 AU_{40}	—	January 5, 2013	Kitt Peak	Spacewatch	·	2.4 km	MPC · JPL
542186	2013 AZ_{40}	—	November 9, 2007	Kitt Peak	Spacewatch	·	1.8 km	MPC · JPL
542187	2013 AB_{43}	—	November 29, 2011	Kitt Peak	Spacewatch	L4	10 km	MPC · JPL
542188	2013 AC_{44}	—	January 5, 2013	Mount Lemmon	Mount Lemmon Survey	·	860 m	MPC · JPL
542189	2013 AL_{44}	—	January 23, 2006	Mount Lemmon	Mount Lemmon Survey	·	900 m	MPC · JPL
542190	2013 AE_{45}	—	January 5, 2013	Kitt Peak	Spacewatch	·	1.3 km	MPC · JPL
542191	2013 AH_{47}	—	November 12, 2012	Mount Lemmon	Mount Lemmon Survey	·	1.5 km	MPC · JPL
542192	2013 AY_{50}	—	November 12, 2012	Mount Lemmon	Mount Lemmon Survey	·	1.1 km	MPC · JPL
542193	2013 AT_{53}	—	October 18, 2007	Kitt Peak	Spacewatch	AGN	1.1 km	MPC · JPL
542194	2013 AW_{53}	—	September 12, 2002	Palomar	NEAT	·	2.2 km	MPC · JPL
542195	2013 AX_{54}	—	February 13, 2002	Kitt Peak	Spacewatch	L4	9.1 km	MPC · JPL
542196	2013 AE_{56}	—	January 6, 2013	Kitt Peak	Spacewatch	·	3.2 km	MPC · JPL
542197	2013 AA_{57}	—	January 6, 2013	Kitt Peak	Spacewatch	·	1.0 km	MPC · JPL
542198	2013 AE_{59}	—	November 19, 2007	Mount Lemmon	Mount Lemmon Survey	·	1.9 km	MPC · JPL
542199	2013 AR_{61}	—	October 28, 2008	Mount Lemmon	Mount Lemmon Survey	·	760 m	MPC · JPL
542200	2013 AJ_{64}	—	November 13, 2012	Mount Lemmon	Mount Lemmon Survey	·	2.8 km	MPC · JPL

== 542201–542300 ==
back to top

Designation			Discovery			Properties		Ref
Permanent	Provisional	Named after	Date	Site	Discoverer(s)	Category	Diam.	Ref
542201	2013 AX_{65}	—	January 6, 2013	Mount Lemmon	Mount Lemmon Survey	·	770 m	MPC · JPL
542202	2013 AM_{66}	—	December 17, 1999	Kitt Peak	Spacewatch	·	750 m	MPC · JPL
542203	2013 AU_{66}	—	October 10, 2007	Mount Lemmon	Mount Lemmon Survey	·	2.0 km	MPC · JPL
542204	2013 AP_{67}	—	February 25, 2007	Mount Lemmon	Mount Lemmon Survey	·	640 m	MPC · JPL
542205	2013 AP_{68}	—	January 4, 2013	Mount Lemmon	Mount Lemmon Survey	·	810 m	MPC · JPL
542206	2013 AT_{70}	—	December 21, 2011	Mayhill-ISON	L. Elenin	L4	10 km	MPC · JPL
542207	2013 AP_{75}	—	November 5, 2010	Mount Lemmon	Mount Lemmon Survey	L4	8.5 km	MPC · JPL
542208	2013 AM_{77}	—	September 13, 2004	Kitt Peak	Spacewatch	·	940 m	MPC · JPL
542209	2013 AE_{79}	—	January 4, 2013	Kitt Peak	Spacewatch	L4	10 km	MPC · JPL
542210	2013 AB_{80}	—	January 10, 2013	Haleakala	Pan-STARRS 1	·	710 m	MPC · JPL
542211	2013 AV_{80}	—	November 19, 2003	Palomar	NEAT	·	2.0 km	MPC · JPL
542212	2013 AD_{81}	—	October 7, 2005	Mauna Kea	A. Boattini	V	790 m	MPC · JPL
542213	2013 AZ_{81}	—	December 11, 2012	Kitt Peak	Spacewatch	·	650 m	MPC · JPL
542214	2013 AT_{84}	—	September 24, 2011	Haleakala	Pan-STARRS 1	·	2.0 km	MPC · JPL
542215	2013 AU_{84}	—	November 20, 2004	Kitt Peak	Spacewatch	MAS	860 m	MPC · JPL
542216	2013 AT_{85}	—	December 15, 2007	Mount Lemmon	Mount Lemmon Survey	·	1.6 km	MPC · JPL
542217	2013 AA_{88}	—	December 23, 2012	Haleakala	Pan-STARRS 1	·	1.8 km	MPC · JPL
542218	2013 AW_{89}	—	June 10, 2005	Kitt Peak	Spacewatch	ADE	2.0 km	MPC · JPL
542219	2013 AC_{90}	—	January 15, 2013	ESA OGS	ESA OGS	·	740 m	MPC · JPL
542220	2013 AC_{91}	—	April 5, 2003	Cerro Tololo	Deep Lens Survey	·	760 m	MPC · JPL
542221	2013 AG_{91}	—	January 15, 2013	ESA OGS	ESA OGS	·	3.1 km	MPC · JPL
542222	2013 AC_{92}	—	December 29, 2008	Mount Lemmon	Mount Lemmon Survey	·	1.9 km	MPC · JPL
542223	2013 AO_{92}	—	November 2, 2008	Kitt Peak	Spacewatch	·	1.1 km	MPC · JPL
542224	2013 AW_{92}	—	April 9, 2003	Palomar	NEAT	·	1.3 km	MPC · JPL
542225	2013 AF_{97}	—	July 31, 2005	Palomar	NEAT	·	2.9 km	MPC · JPL
542226	2013 AO_{98}	—	December 16, 2006	Kitt Peak	Spacewatch	·	4.0 km	MPC · JPL
542227	2013 AR_{98}	—	February 1, 2006	Kitt Peak	Spacewatch	·	840 m	MPC · JPL
542228	2013 AJ_{99}	—	January 25, 2009	Kitt Peak	Spacewatch	·	1.9 km	MPC · JPL
542229	2013 AY_{99}	—	January 8, 2013	Mount Lemmon	Mount Lemmon Survey	·	2.0 km	MPC · JPL
542230	2013 AE_{102}	—	November 30, 2005	Kitt Peak	Spacewatch	·	990 m	MPC · JPL
542231	2013 AC_{103}	—	September 25, 2003	Palomar	NEAT	EUN	1.4 km	MPC · JPL
542232	2013 AZ_{105}	—	January 10, 2013	Haleakala	Pan-STARRS 1	·	580 m	MPC · JPL
542233	2013 AH_{106}	—	September 29, 2011	Piszkéstető	K. Sárneczky	V	830 m	MPC · JPL
542234	2013 AL_{106}	—	August 27, 2006	Kitt Peak	Spacewatch	·	1.9 km	MPC · JPL
542235	2013 AS_{107}	—	October 24, 2008	Kitt Peak	Spacewatch	·	950 m	MPC · JPL
542236	2013 AV_{108}	—	September 23, 2011	Kitt Peak	Spacewatch	·	1.6 km	MPC · JPL
542237	2013 AH_{113}	—	September 26, 2011	Haleakala	Pan-STARRS 1	HOF	2.4 km	MPC · JPL
542238	2013 AZ_{115}	—	January 14, 2013	ESA OGS	ESA OGS	·	820 m	MPC · JPL
542239	2013 AF_{116}	—	February 12, 2004	Kitt Peak	Spacewatch	GEF	1.4 km	MPC · JPL
542240	2013 AV_{116}	—	January 14, 2013	ESA OGS	ESA OGS	·	1.1 km	MPC · JPL
542241	2013 AZ_{119}	—	December 23, 2012	Haleakala	Pan-STARRS 1	·	1.3 km	MPC · JPL
542242	2013 AJ_{127}	—	December 12, 2012	Mount Lemmon	Mount Lemmon Survey	GAL	1.5 km	MPC · JPL
542243	2013 AJ_{128}	—	July 25, 2006	Palomar	NEAT	GEF	1.6 km	MPC · JPL
542244	2013 AO_{131}	—	January 6, 2013	Kitt Peak	Spacewatch	NYS	980 m	MPC · JPL
542245	2013 AP_{131}	—	January 7, 2013	Oukaïmeden	M. Ory	URS	3.6 km	MPC · JPL
542246 Kulcsár	2013 AL_{132}	Kulcsár	August 26, 2008	Piszkéstető	K. Sárneczky	L4	9.6 km	MPC · JPL
542247	2013 AX_{133}	—	December 12, 2012	Nogales	M. Schwartz, P. R. Holvorcem	·	1.1 km	MPC · JPL
542248	2013 AF_{137}	—	February 17, 2010	Kitt Peak	Spacewatch	·	940 m	MPC · JPL
542249	2013 AH_{137}	—	July 5, 2003	Kitt Peak	Spacewatch	NYS	1.2 km	MPC · JPL
542250	2013 AT_{137}	—	November 6, 2007	Kitt Peak	Spacewatch	·	1.9 km	MPC · JPL
542251	2013 AH_{150}	—	January 4, 2013	Cerro Tololo	DECam	·	720 m	MPC · JPL
542252	2013 AW_{150}	—	June 10, 2007	Kitt Peak	Spacewatch	·	1.0 km	MPC · JPL
542253	2013 AR_{154}	—	January 20, 2013	Mount Lemmon	Mount Lemmon Survey	·	1.1 km	MPC · JPL
542254	2013 AY_{159}	—	April 2, 2005	Kitt Peak	Spacewatch	GEF	1.1 km	MPC · JPL
542255	2013 AB_{166}	—	August 5, 2005	Palomar	NEAT	·	2.8 km	MPC · JPL
542256	2013 AW_{180}	—	February 11, 2008	Mount Lemmon	Mount Lemmon Survey	EOS	1.8 km	MPC · JPL
542257	2013 AX_{182}	—	September 20, 2003	Palomar	NEAT	·	1.6 km	MPC · JPL
542258	2013 AP_{183}	—	January 10, 2013	Haleakala	Pan-STARRS 1	res · 3:8	281 km	MPC · JPL
542259	2013 AY_{185}	—	September 2, 2011	Haleakala	Pan-STARRS 1	·	1.4 km	MPC · JPL
542260	2013 AF_{187}	—	January 10, 2013	Haleakala	Pan-STARRS 1	·	770 m	MPC · JPL
542261	2013 BJ	—	December 23, 2012	Haleakala	Pan-STARRS 1	L4	7.9 km	MPC · JPL
542262	2013 BL	—	November 3, 2010	Mount Lemmon	Mount Lemmon Survey	L4	9.0 km	MPC · JPL
542263	2013 BS	—	September 28, 2009	Kitt Peak	Spacewatch	L4	10 km	MPC · JPL
542264	2013 BC_{2}	—	March 24, 2003	Needville	J. Dellinger	L4	8.2 km	MPC · JPL
542265	2013 BT_{2}	—	September 17, 2009	Kitt Peak	Spacewatch	L4	8.3 km	MPC · JPL
542266	2013 BJ_{5}	—	January 16, 2013	Mount Lemmon	Mount Lemmon Survey	·	3.5 km	MPC · JPL
542267	2013 BX_{5}	—	April 6, 2010	Kitt Peak	Spacewatch	V	730 m	MPC · JPL
542268	2013 BV_{8}	—	March 29, 2009	Mount Lemmon	Mount Lemmon Survey	HOF	2.2 km	MPC · JPL
542269	2013 BZ_{9}	—	November 7, 2008	Mount Lemmon	Mount Lemmon Survey	V	630 m	MPC · JPL
542270	2013 BJ_{10}	—	January 16, 2013	Haleakala	Pan-STARRS 1	HOF	2.4 km	MPC · JPL
542271	2013 BU_{11}	—	January 7, 2006	Kitt Peak	Spacewatch	·	960 m	MPC · JPL
542272	2013 BO_{12}	—	December 23, 2012	Haleakala	Pan-STARRS 1	V	570 m	MPC · JPL
542273	2013 BG_{13}	—	December 30, 2005	Mount Lemmon	Mount Lemmon Survey	·	560 m	MPC · JPL
542274	2013 BN_{14}	—	February 11, 2004	Palomar	NEAT	·	1.7 km	MPC · JPL
542275	2013 BY_{16}	—	November 2, 2010	Mount Lemmon	Mount Lemmon Survey	L4 · ERY	8.8 km	MPC · JPL
542276	2013 BB_{19}	—	December 13, 2012	Kitt Peak	Spacewatch	L4	10 km	MPC · JPL
542277	2013 BZ_{21}	—	October 10, 2004	Kitt Peak	Deep Ecliptic Survey	·	1.2 km	MPC · JPL
542278	2013 BW_{22}	—	October 2, 2008	Catalina	CSS	·	1.1 km	MPC · JPL
542279	2013 BB_{23}	—	April 9, 2002	Palomar	NEAT	PHO	920 m	MPC · JPL
542280	2013 BO_{25}	—	April 23, 2009	Kitt Peak	Spacewatch	·	2.0 km	MPC · JPL
542281	2013 BN_{28}	—	January 16, 2013	Mount Lemmon SkyCe	Kostin, A., T. Vorobjov	V	760 m	MPC · JPL
542282	2013 BU_{28}	—	July 31, 2005	Palomar	NEAT	·	3.3 km	MPC · JPL
542283	2013 BC_{30}	—	January 16, 2013	Haleakala	Pan-STARRS 1	·	1.3 km	MPC · JPL
542284	2013 BB_{33}	—	March 23, 2003	Kitt Peak	Spacewatch	V	630 m	MPC · JPL
542285	2013 BE_{33}	—	December 8, 1999	Kitt Peak	Spacewatch	·	1.4 km	MPC · JPL
542286	2013 BL_{33}	—	January 23, 2006	Mount Lemmon	Mount Lemmon Survey	·	840 m	MPC · JPL
542287	2013 BV_{34}	—	August 13, 2010	Kitt Peak	Spacewatch	·	2.0 km	MPC · JPL
542288	2013 BA_{35}	—	August 22, 2003	Palomar	NEAT	(5)	1.3 km	MPC · JPL
542289	2013 BT_{35}	—	March 11, 1997	Kitt Peak	Spacewatch	THM	2.2 km	MPC · JPL
542290	2013 BV_{35}	—	June 21, 2010	Mount Lemmon	Mount Lemmon Survey	·	1.7 km	MPC · JPL
542291	2013 BF_{37}	—	August 27, 2006	Kitt Peak	Spacewatch	AGN	1.4 km	MPC · JPL
542292	2013 BD_{38}	—	January 5, 2013	Mount Lemmon	Mount Lemmon Survey	·	910 m	MPC · JPL
542293	2013 BN_{39}	—	December 3, 2005	Mauna Kea	A. Boattini	·	900 m	MPC · JPL
542294	2013 BX_{40}	—	November 1, 2006	Mount Lemmon	Mount Lemmon Survey	·	1.6 km	MPC · JPL
542295	2013 BT_{41}	—	October 26, 2008	Kitt Peak	Spacewatch	ERI	1.2 km	MPC · JPL
542296	2013 BW_{43}	—	November 3, 2011	Catalina	CSS	T_{j} (2.92)	3.6 km	MPC · JPL
542297	2013 BM_{47}	—	January 16, 2013	Haleakala	Pan-STARRS 1	·	1.7 km	MPC · JPL
542298	2013 BN_{48}	—	December 31, 2008	Piszkéstető	K. Sárneczky	·	1.3 km	MPC · JPL
542299	2013 BK_{49}	—	April 18, 1998	Kitt Peak	Spacewatch	·	1.2 km	MPC · JPL
542300	2013 BH_{50}	—	January 16, 2013	Haleakala	Pan-STARRS 1	·	1.1 km	MPC · JPL

== 542301–542400 ==
back to top

Designation			Discovery			Properties		Ref
Permanent	Provisional	Named after	Date	Site	Discoverer(s)	Category	Diam.	Ref
542301	2013 BX_{53}	—	January 18, 2008	Kitt Peak	Spacewatch	·	1.7 km	MPC · JPL
542302	2013 BT_{57}	—	November 8, 2008	Mount Lemmon	Mount Lemmon Survey	NYS	780 m	MPC · JPL
542303	2013 BT_{58}	—	March 7, 2008	Kitt Peak	Spacewatch	·	3.5 km	MPC · JPL
542304	2013 BX_{59}	—	January 5, 2013	Kitt Peak	Spacewatch	·	1.1 km	MPC · JPL
542305	2013 BD_{68}	—	November 9, 2008	Kitt Peak	Spacewatch	NYS	790 m	MPC · JPL
542306	2013 BL_{68}	—	November 20, 2008	Kitt Peak	Spacewatch	·	730 m	MPC · JPL
542307	2013 BX_{68}	—	January 10, 2013	Oukaïmeden	M. Ory	·	1.4 km	MPC · JPL
542308	2013 BJ_{70}	—	June 8, 2011	Mount Lemmon	Mount Lemmon Survey	H	680 m	MPC · JPL
542309	2013 BV_{74}	—	August 31, 2005	Kitt Peak	Spacewatch	·	2.7 km	MPC · JPL
542310	2013 BH_{78}	—	July 27, 2011	Haleakala	Pan-STARRS 1	PHO	1.2 km	MPC · JPL
542311	2013 BK_{79}	—	January 14, 2002	Kitt Peak	Spacewatch	·	1.1 km	MPC · JPL
542312	2013 BD_{81}	—	September 23, 2008	Kitt Peak	Spacewatch	·	800 m	MPC · JPL
542313	2013 BZ_{82}	—	September 12, 2007	Kitt Peak	Spacewatch	·	1.2 km	MPC · JPL
542314	2013 BA_{83}	—	October 19, 2011	Mount Lemmon	Mount Lemmon Survey	·	920 m	MPC · JPL
542315	2013 BR_{83}	—	January 16, 2013	Mount Lemmon	Mount Lemmon Survey	·	830 m	MPC · JPL
542316	2013 CV	—	September 2, 2008	Kitt Peak	Spacewatch	L4	7.7 km	MPC · JPL
542317	2013 CQ_{2}	—	July 5, 2005	Palomar	NEAT	·	2.5 km	MPC · JPL
542318	2013 CH_{5}	—	January 10, 2013	Haleakala	Pan-STARRS 1	·	900 m	MPC · JPL
542319	2013 CT_{7}	—	September 28, 2006	Catalina	CSS	·	2.2 km	MPC · JPL
542320	2013 CV_{8}	—	February 27, 2009	Kitt Peak	Spacewatch	·	1.7 km	MPC · JPL
542321	2013 CV_{9}	—	January 10, 2013	Haleakala	Pan-STARRS 1	V	640 m	MPC · JPL
542322	2013 CF_{12}	—	February 26, 2009	Kitt Peak	Spacewatch	·	1.1 km	MPC · JPL
542323	2013 CR_{12}	—	July 24, 2007	Mauna Kea	D. D. Balam, K. M. Perrett	L4 · ERY	7.6 km	MPC · JPL
542324	2013 CC_{14}	—	March 8, 2005	Mount Lemmon	Mount Lemmon Survey	·	1.3 km	MPC · JPL
542325	2013 CB_{16}	—	December 27, 2011	Kitt Peak	Spacewatch	L4	9.3 km	MPC · JPL
542326	2013 CO_{16}	—	November 7, 2005	Mauna Kea	A. Boattini	·	740 m	MPC · JPL
542327	2013 CX_{16}	—	March 25, 2006	Mount Lemmon	Mount Lemmon Survey	MAS	770 m	MPC · JPL
542328	2013 CY_{17}	—	October 5, 2007	Charleston	R. Holmes	·	1.3 km	MPC · JPL
542329	2013 CT_{18}	—	September 30, 2005	Mauna Kea	A. Boattini	·	860 m	MPC · JPL
542330	2013 CC_{20}	—	December 24, 2006	Kitt Peak	Spacewatch	LIX	4.1 km	MPC · JPL
542331	2013 CY_{21}	—	February 4, 2013	Oukaïmeden	C. Rinner	·	1.8 km	MPC · JPL
542332	2013 CS_{24}	—	September 27, 2011	Mount Lemmon	Mount Lemmon Survey	·	790 m	MPC · JPL
542333	2013 CV_{24}	—	November 19, 2008	Mount Lemmon	Mount Lemmon Survey	·	930 m	MPC · JPL
542334	2013 CG_{25}	—	October 20, 2011	Mount Lemmon	Mount Lemmon Survey	V	660 m	MPC · JPL
542335	2013 CJ_{25}	—	January 10, 2013	Kitt Peak	Spacewatch	NYS	910 m	MPC · JPL
542336	2013 CP_{26}	—	January 17, 2013	Kitt Peak	Spacewatch	·	2.2 km	MPC · JPL
542337	2013 CL_{27}	—	June 16, 2004	Kitt Peak	Spacewatch	·	3.4 km	MPC · JPL
542338	2013 CR_{27}	—	February 4, 2013	Oukaïmeden	C. Rinner	·	2.1 km	MPC · JPL
542339	2013 CM_{29}	—	December 1, 2005	Mount Lemmon	Mount Lemmon Survey	·	690 m	MPC · JPL
542340	2013 CY_{30}	—	October 22, 2006	Kitt Peak	Spacewatch	KOR	1.2 km	MPC · JPL
542341	2013 CR_{31}	—	February 5, 2013	Oukaïmeden	C. Rinner	·	2.8 km	MPC · JPL
542342	2013 CY_{31}	—	January 26, 2004	Anderson Mesa	LONEOS	·	3.0 km	MPC · JPL
542343	2013 CP_{32}	—	October 16, 2002	Palomar	NEAT	·	1.8 km	MPC · JPL
542344	2013 CT_{34}	—	January 8, 2006	Mount Lemmon	Mount Lemmon Survey	PHO	800 m	MPC · JPL
542345	2013 CU_{34}	—	July 7, 2003	Palomar	NEAT	·	2.0 km	MPC · JPL
542346	2013 CV_{35}	—	March 26, 2003	Palomar	NEAT	L4	9.8 km	MPC · JPL
542347	2013 CS_{37}	—	September 21, 2011	Mount Lemmon	Mount Lemmon Survey	·	2.5 km	MPC · JPL
542348	2013 CA_{38}	—	January 21, 2013	Mount Lemmon	Mount Lemmon Survey	·	1.1 km	MPC · JPL
542349	2013 CF_{38}	—	February 6, 2013	Catalina	CSS	LIX	3.6 km	MPC · JPL
542350	2013 CF_{39}	—	March 31, 2003	Cerro Tololo	Deep Lens Survey	L4	9.5 km	MPC · JPL
542351	2013 CC_{42}	—	November 7, 2007	Catalina	CSS	EUN	970 m	MPC · JPL
542352	2013 CE_{44}	—	September 9, 2007	Mauna Kea	D. D. Balam, K. M. Perrett	L4	8.2 km	MPC · JPL
542353	2013 CN_{45}	—	July 27, 2001	Anderson Mesa	LONEOS	·	710 m	MPC · JPL
542354	2013 CN_{48}	—	January 18, 2013	Oukaïmeden	C. Rinner	·	1.9 km	MPC · JPL
542355	2013 CP_{48}	—	February 6, 2013	Oukaïmeden	C. Rinner	MAS	660 m	MPC · JPL
542356	2013 CT_{51}	—	October 24, 2011	Haleakala	Pan-STARRS 1	·	2.1 km	MPC · JPL
542357	2013 CX_{52}	—	November 24, 2002	Palomar	NEAT	EUN	1.4 km	MPC · JPL
542358	2013 CN_{53}	—	October 20, 2011	Mount Lemmon	Mount Lemmon Survey	·	1.4 km	MPC · JPL
542359	2013 CC_{54}	—	May 27, 1997	Kitt Peak	Spacewatch	·	2.6 km	MPC · JPL
542360	2013 CA_{57}	—	January 18, 2013	Haleakala	Pan-STARRS 1	·	1.1 km	MPC · JPL
542361	2013 CF_{57}	—	October 25, 2003	Kitt Peak	Spacewatch	·	1.4 km	MPC · JPL
542362	2013 CO_{57}	—	August 21, 2008	Marly	P. Kocher	3:2	7.8 km	MPC · JPL
542363	2013 CY_{58}	—	April 20, 2009	Kitt Peak	Spacewatch	TEL	1.6 km	MPC · JPL
542364	2013 CG_{59}	—	September 27, 2008	Mount Lemmon	Mount Lemmon Survey	·	850 m	MPC · JPL
542365	2013 CD_{60}	—	August 21, 2006	Kitt Peak	Spacewatch	·	2.4 km	MPC · JPL
542366	2013 CB_{62}	—	February 6, 2013	Nogales	M. Schwartz, P. R. Holvorcem	·	2.8 km	MPC · JPL
542367	2013 CF_{62}	—	November 1, 2007	Mount Lemmon	Mount Lemmon Survey	KON	2.3 km	MPC · JPL
542368	2013 CT_{62}	—	February 7, 2013	Catalina	CSS	·	830 m	MPC · JPL
542369	2013 CU_{62}	—	October 22, 2008	Kitt Peak	Spacewatch	·	720 m	MPC · JPL
542370	2013 CC_{63}	—	February 8, 2013	Haleakala	Pan-STARRS 1	·	1.1 km	MPC · JPL
542371	2013 CD_{63}	—	December 7, 2001	Kitt Peak	Spacewatch	·	2.7 km	MPC · JPL
542372	2013 CG_{66}	—	September 30, 2005	Mauna Kea	A. Boattini	·	780 m	MPC · JPL
542373	2013 CB_{67}	—	April 9, 2002	Palomar	NEAT	·	1.5 km	MPC · JPL
542374	2013 CR_{67}	—	February 6, 2002	Palomar	NEAT	·	3.2 km	MPC · JPL
542375	2013 CV_{67}	—	July 21, 2004	Siding Spring	SSS	·	3.5 km	MPC · JPL
542376	2013 CZ_{68}	—	March 3, 2006	Kitt Peak	Spacewatch	·	940 m	MPC · JPL
542377	2013 CN_{70}	—	February 1, 2013	Kitt Peak	Spacewatch	NYS	960 m	MPC · JPL
542378	2013 CZ_{70}	—	January 10, 2013	Haleakala	Pan-STARRS 1	L4	7.5 km	MPC · JPL
542379	2013 CA_{71}	—	April 21, 2002	Kitt Peak	Spacewatch	·	1.4 km	MPC · JPL
542380	2013 CO_{72}	—	February 1, 2009	Mount Lemmon	Mount Lemmon Survey	·	1.5 km	MPC · JPL
542381	2013 CH_{73}	—	October 9, 2004	Kitt Peak	Spacewatch	NYS	900 m	MPC · JPL
542382	2013 CA_{74}	—	March 9, 2002	Palomar	NEAT	·	1.2 km	MPC · JPL
542383	2013 CK_{74}	—	August 17, 2006	Palomar	NEAT	·	2.6 km	MPC · JPL
542384	2013 CO_{75}	—	February 5, 2013	Kitt Peak	Spacewatch	·	2.4 km	MPC · JPL
542385	2013 CP_{78}	—	February 7, 2002	Palomar	NEAT	EOS	2.7 km	MPC · JPL
542386	2013 CC_{79}	—	January 9, 2013	Kitt Peak	Spacewatch	V	610 m	MPC · JPL
542387	2013 CF_{81}	—	December 9, 2006	Kitt Peak	Spacewatch	·	2.2 km	MPC · JPL
542388	2013 CQ_{81}	—	February 8, 2013	Haleakala	Pan-STARRS 1	EOS	1.7 km	MPC · JPL
542389	2013 CY_{82}	—	August 27, 2005	Palomar	NEAT	·	2.9 km	MPC · JPL
542390	2013 CB_{84}	—	March 11, 2005	Mount Lemmon	Mount Lemmon Survey	·	1.3 km	MPC · JPL
542391	2013 CX_{87}	—	February 9, 2013	Haleakala	Pan-STARRS 1	H	440 m	MPC · JPL
542392	2013 CE_{90}	—	August 24, 2003	Cerro Tololo	Deep Ecliptic Survey	·	1.4 km	MPC · JPL
542393	2013 CK_{90}	—	September 4, 2011	Haleakala	Pan-STARRS 1	·	790 m	MPC · JPL
542394	2013 CE_{91}	—	May 16, 2005	Mount Lemmon	Mount Lemmon Survey	·	1.9 km	MPC · JPL
542395	2013 CR_{91}	—	February 8, 2013	Haleakala	Pan-STARRS 1	EUN	1.0 km	MPC · JPL
542396	2013 CX_{91}	—	February 8, 2013	Haleakala	Pan-STARRS 1	·	2.6 km	MPC · JPL
542397	2013 CT_{94}	—	February 8, 2008	Kitt Peak	Spacewatch	·	1.6 km	MPC · JPL
542398	2013 CY_{94}	—	February 17, 2005	La Silla	A. Boattini	(5)	1 km	MPC · JPL
542399	2013 CH_{95}	—	September 23, 2008	Kitt Peak	Spacewatch	L4 · ERY	7.9 km	MPC · JPL
542400	2013 CO_{95}	—	August 22, 2004	Kitt Peak	Spacewatch	·	3.0 km	MPC · JPL

== 542401–542500 ==
back to top

Designation			Discovery			Properties		Ref
Permanent	Provisional	Named after	Date	Site	Discoverer(s)	Category	Diam.	Ref
542401	2013 CF_{98}	—	March 26, 2009	Cerro Burek	Burek, Cerro	·	3.5 km	MPC · JPL
542402	2013 CJ_{101}	—	March 13, 2008	Mount Lemmon	Mount Lemmon Survey	·	1.7 km	MPC · JPL
542403	2013 CC_{103}	—	July 27, 2001	Anderson Mesa	LONEOS	·	2.3 km	MPC · JPL
542404	2013 CG_{103}	—	October 12, 2007	Mount Lemmon	Mount Lemmon Survey	·	1.1 km	MPC · JPL
542405	2013 CL_{103}	—	February 2, 2013	Kitt Peak	Spacewatch	V	600 m	MPC · JPL
542406	2013 CB_{105}	—	January 18, 2013	Kitt Peak	Spacewatch	·	980 m	MPC · JPL
542407	2013 CE_{105}	—	April 18, 2009	Mount Lemmon	Mount Lemmon Survey	·	1.3 km	MPC · JPL
542408	2013 CS_{105}	—	August 30, 2005	Kitt Peak	Spacewatch	·	2.5 km	MPC · JPL
542409	2013 CA_{108}	—	September 4, 2010	Sternwarte Hagen	Tiedtke, J., Klein, M.	·	1.6 km	MPC · JPL
542410	2013 CA_{110}	—	January 19, 2013	Kitt Peak	Spacewatch	·	1.0 km	MPC · JPL
542411	2013 CZ_{112}	—	August 19, 2002	Palomar	NEAT	MAR	1.2 km	MPC · JPL
542412	2013 CW_{114}	—	February 14, 2002	Kitt Peak	Spacewatch	·	2.6 km	MPC · JPL
542413	2013 CX_{115}	—	January 13, 2013	Catalina	CSS	PHO	1 km	MPC · JPL
542414	2013 CX_{116}	—	April 13, 2002	Palomar	NEAT	·	4.5 km	MPC · JPL
542415	2013 CB_{122}	—	August 25, 2005	Palomar	NEAT	·	2.3 km	MPC · JPL
542416	2013 CX_{122}	—	May 21, 2005	Palomar	NEAT	EUN	1.3 km	MPC · JPL
542417	2013 CJ_{123}	—	September 25, 2006	Mount Lemmon	Mount Lemmon Survey	·	1.8 km	MPC · JPL
542418	2013 CA_{125}	—	February 13, 2013	ESA OGS	ESA OGS	·	900 m	MPC · JPL
542419	2013 CP_{125}	—	October 19, 2011	Kitt Peak	Spacewatch	·	1.2 km	MPC · JPL
542420	2013 CW_{127}	—	February 6, 2013	Elena Remote	Oreshko, A.	·	1.1 km	MPC · JPL
542421	2013 CB_{128}	—	January 11, 2013	Haleakala	Pan-STARRS 1	H	530 m	MPC · JPL
542422	2013 CT_{129}	—	July 1, 2002	Palomar	NEAT	T_{j} (2.99)	3.5 km	MPC · JPL
542423	2013 CP_{132}	—	February 14, 2013	Haleakala	Pan-STARRS 1	·	2.8 km	MPC · JPL
542424	2013 CA_{136}	—	November 21, 2003	Palomar	NEAT	·	1.8 km	MPC · JPL
542425	2013 CQ_{136}	—	October 31, 2005	Mauna Kea	A. Boattini	PHO	840 m	MPC · JPL
542426	2013 CR_{136}	—	October 4, 2004	Kitt Peak	Spacewatch	·	1.3 km	MPC · JPL
542427	2013 CJ_{138}	—	March 1, 2009	Kitt Peak	Spacewatch	MIS	2.3 km	MPC · JPL
542428	2013 CL_{140}	—	February 14, 2013	Kitt Peak	Spacewatch	V	670 m	MPC · JPL
542429	2013 CD_{146}	—	August 19, 2006	Kitt Peak	Spacewatch	·	2.0 km	MPC · JPL
542430	2013 CS_{146}	—	January 11, 2008	Kitt Peak	Spacewatch	HOF	2.5 km	MPC · JPL
542431	2013 CX_{147}	—	February 4, 2006	Catalina	CSS	PHO	610 m	MPC · JPL
542432	2013 CD_{149}	—	February 14, 2013	Kitt Peak	Spacewatch	·	630 m	MPC · JPL
542433	2013 CN_{149}	—	October 11, 2004	Kitt Peak	Deep Ecliptic Survey	MAS	770 m	MPC · JPL
542434	2013 CF_{150}	—	December 10, 2004	Kitt Peak	Spacewatch	·	1.1 km	MPC · JPL
542435	2013 CU_{151}	—	September 29, 2003	Kitt Peak	Spacewatch	·	850 m	MPC · JPL
542436	2013 CY_{151}	—	October 24, 2011	Haleakala	Pan-STARRS 1	WIT	770 m	MPC · JPL
542437	2013 CP_{153}	—	September 11, 2002	Palomar	NEAT	·	1.8 km	MPC · JPL
542438	2013 CR_{153}	—	February 14, 2013	Haleakala	Pan-STARRS 1	·	1.6 km	MPC · JPL
542439	2013 CU_{153}	—	September 3, 2007	Catalina	CSS	·	1.3 km	MPC · JPL
542440	2013 CE_{154}	—	November 2, 2006	Mount Lemmon	Mount Lemmon Survey	·	2.0 km	MPC · JPL
542441	2013 CG_{158}	—	January 13, 2008	Kitt Peak	Spacewatch	HOF	2.6 km	MPC · JPL
542442	2013 CW_{158}	—	April 30, 2008	Mount Lemmon	Mount Lemmon Survey	·	2.7 km	MPC · JPL
542443	2013 CD_{160}	—	January 27, 2007	Mount Lemmon	Mount Lemmon Survey	·	3.6 km	MPC · JPL
542444	2013 CK_{162}	—	March 24, 2009	Mount Lemmon	Mount Lemmon Survey	EUN	1.5 km	MPC · JPL
542445	2013 CG_{165}	—	August 23, 2004	Kitt Peak	Spacewatch	·	2.2 km	MPC · JPL
542446	2013 CL_{165}	—	August 6, 2005	Palomar	NEAT	·	2.6 km	MPC · JPL
542447	2013 CY_{169}	—	September 26, 2006	Mount Lemmon	Mount Lemmon Survey	·	1.8 km	MPC · JPL
542448	2013 CE_{175}	—	March 12, 2008	Mount Lemmon	Mount Lemmon Survey	·	2.3 km	MPC · JPL
542449	2013 CU_{177}	—	May 31, 2006	Mount Lemmon	Mount Lemmon Survey	·	940 m	MPC · JPL
542450	2013 CF_{179}	—	December 3, 2005	Mauna Kea	A. Boattini	·	1.1 km	MPC · JPL
542451	2013 CH_{179}	—	January 23, 2006	Kitt Peak	Spacewatch	·	720 m	MPC · JPL
542452	2013 CN_{179}	—	February 2, 2008	Mount Lemmon	Mount Lemmon Survey	·	2.1 km	MPC · JPL
542453	2013 CC_{180}	—	February 28, 2006	Mount Lemmon	Mount Lemmon Survey	V	730 m	MPC · JPL
542454	2013 CJ_{182}	—	December 22, 2008	Kitt Peak	Spacewatch	·	1.1 km	MPC · JPL
542455	2013 CM_{184}	—	January 1, 2008	Mount Lemmon	Mount Lemmon Survey	DOR	2.3 km	MPC · JPL
542456	2013 CX_{184}	—	February 7, 2013	Nogales	M. Schwartz, P. R. Holvorcem	·	1.2 km	MPC · JPL
542457	2013 CG_{186}	—	November 7, 2004	Palomar	NEAT	·	1.3 km	MPC · JPL
542458	2013 CQ_{189}	—	May 22, 2001	Cerro Tololo	Deep Ecliptic Survey	·	2.6 km	MPC · JPL
542459	2013 CQ_{191}	—	February 12, 2013	ESA OGS	ESA OGS	3:2	5.9 km	MPC · JPL
542460	2013 CU_{191}	—	February 13, 2013	ESA OGS	ESA OGS	·	1.4 km	MPC · JPL
542461 Slovinský	2013 CA_{196}	Slovinský	October 3, 2010	Piszkéstető	S. Kürti, K. Sárneczky	·	2.9 km	MPC · JPL
542462	2013 CX_{196}	—	January 19, 2013	Kitt Peak	Spacewatch	·	880 m	MPC · JPL
542463	2013 CC_{197}	—	October 7, 2005	Mount Lemmon	Mount Lemmon Survey	·	1.7 km	MPC · JPL
542464	2013 CE_{199}	—	October 18, 2003	Kitt Peak	Spacewatch	·	1.2 km	MPC · JPL
542465	2013 CG_{199}	—	December 31, 2008	Kitt Peak	Spacewatch	·	1.5 km	MPC · JPL
542466	2013 CX_{199}	—	April 26, 2000	Kitt Peak	Spacewatch	·	2.0 km	MPC · JPL
542467	2013 CU_{200}	—	March 19, 2009	Kitt Peak	Spacewatch	·	2.0 km	MPC · JPL
542468	2013 CY_{200}	—	February 9, 2013	Haleakala	Pan-STARRS 1	·	1.6 km	MPC · JPL
542469	2013 CZ_{200}	—	January 18, 2013	Mount Lemmon	Mount Lemmon Survey	·	1.5 km	MPC · JPL
542470	2013 CX_{202}	—	February 9, 2013	Haleakala	Pan-STARRS 1	·	1.5 km	MPC · JPL
542471	2013 CA_{204}	—	January 20, 2009	Kitt Peak	Spacewatch	·	1.4 km	MPC · JPL
542472	2013 CB_{206}	—	January 8, 2006	Mount Lemmon	Mount Lemmon Survey	·	700 m	MPC · JPL
542473	2013 CY_{207}	—	August 20, 2006	Palomar	NEAT	·	1.4 km	MPC · JPL
542474	2013 CZ_{207}	—	March 24, 2006	Kitt Peak	Spacewatch	NYS	850 m	MPC · JPL
542475	2013 CX_{208}	—	November 18, 2007	Mount Lemmon	Mount Lemmon Survey	·	2.2 km	MPC · JPL
542476	2013 CC_{209}	—	August 18, 2006	Palomar	NEAT	·	2.7 km	MPC · JPL
542477	2013 CB_{210}	—	January 10, 2013	Haleakala	Pan-STARRS 1	·	1.0 km	MPC · JPL
542478	2013 CG_{210}	—	October 15, 2001	Palomar	NEAT	·	830 m	MPC · JPL
542479	2013 CG_{216}	—	December 5, 2007	Kitt Peak	Spacewatch	·	2.2 km	MPC · JPL
542480	2013 CA_{217}	—	May 29, 2006	Kitt Peak	Spacewatch	·	1.9 km	MPC · JPL
542481	2013 CF_{218}	—	February 8, 2013	Haleakala	Pan-STARRS 1	KOR	1.3 km	MPC · JPL
542482	2013 CL_{218}	—	February 8, 2013	Haleakala	Pan-STARRS 1	EOS	1.7 km	MPC · JPL
542483	2013 CS_{220}	—	February 9, 2013	Haleakala	Pan-STARRS 1	GEF	1.2 km	MPC · JPL
542484	2013 CG_{224}	—	November 5, 2007	Kitt Peak	Spacewatch	·	1.2 km	MPC · JPL
542485	2013 CV_{224}	—	December 31, 2008	Kitt Peak	Spacewatch	V	530 m	MPC · JPL
542486	2013 CP_{225}	—	September 7, 2011	Kitt Peak	Spacewatch	·	1.1 km	MPC · JPL
542487	2013 CT_{225}	—	January 3, 2009	Kitt Peak	Spacewatch	·	910 m	MPC · JPL
542488	2013 CQ_{228}	—	March 1, 2009	Kitt Peak	Spacewatch	·	1.1 km	MPC · JPL
542489	2013 CY_{228}	—	September 28, 2001	Palomar	NEAT	·	2.2 km	MPC · JPL
542490	2013 DH	—	October 2, 2006	Mount Lemmon	Mount Lemmon Survey	AGN	1.2 km	MPC · JPL
542491	2013 DQ	—	February 16, 2013	Oukaïmeden	C. Rinner	PHO	840 m	MPC · JPL
542492	2013 DZ_{2}	—	December 19, 2004	Mount Lemmon	Mount Lemmon Survey	V	790 m	MPC · JPL
542493	2013 DE_{5}	—	October 4, 2011	Piszkéstető	K. Sárneczky	·	920 m	MPC · JPL
542494	2013 DQ_{6}	—	August 31, 2005	Palomar	NEAT	·	3.3 km	MPC · JPL
542495	2013 DR_{7}	—	October 19, 2000	Kitt Peak	Spacewatch	·	1.2 km	MPC · JPL
542496	2013 DQ_{8}	—	October 29, 2002	Kitt Peak	Spacewatch	(7744)	1.8 km	MPC · JPL
542497	2013 DT_{9}	—	January 19, 2013	Catalina	CSS	PHO	1.1 km	MPC · JPL
542498	2013 DC_{12}	—	August 7, 2010	XuYi	PMO NEO Survey Program	EOS	2.3 km	MPC · JPL
542499	2013 DJ_{12}	—	February 5, 2013	Nogales	M. Schwartz, P. R. Holvorcem	·	1.3 km	MPC · JPL
542500	2013 DN_{14}	—	January 1, 2009	Mount Lemmon	Mount Lemmon Survey	·	1.1 km	MPC · JPL

== 542501–542600 ==
back to top

Designation			Discovery			Properties		Ref
Permanent	Provisional	Named after	Date	Site	Discoverer(s)	Category	Diam.	Ref
542501	2013 DO_{15}	—	July 31, 2005	Palomar	NEAT	·	2.2 km	MPC · JPL
542502	2013 ED	—	September 9, 2007	Mount Lemmon	Mount Lemmon Survey	NYS	1.3 km	MPC · JPL
542503	2013 EU_{1}	—	August 22, 2004	Kitt Peak	Spacewatch	·	3.1 km	MPC · JPL
542504	2013 EG_{2}	—	December 19, 2003	Kitt Peak	Spacewatch	·	1.5 km	MPC · JPL
542505	2013 EU_{4}	—	April 15, 2008	Mount Lemmon	Mount Lemmon Survey	H	420 m	MPC · JPL
542506	2013 EV_{6}	—	February 8, 2013	Kitt Peak	Spacewatch	NEM	1.8 km	MPC · JPL
542507	2013 EN_{9}	—	January 9, 2013	Mount Lemmon	Mount Lemmon Survey	·	910 m	MPC · JPL
542508	2013 EE_{11}	—	March 30, 2008	Catalina	CSS	H	480 m	MPC · JPL
542509 Lyatoshynsky	2013 EU_{18}	Lyatoshynsky	October 30, 2011	Andrushivka	Y. Ivaščenko, Kyrylenko, P.	·	1.5 km	MPC · JPL
542510	2013 EY_{18}	—	September 15, 2006	Kitt Peak	Spacewatch	·	1.4 km	MPC · JPL
542511	2013 EU_{20}	—	August 29, 2006	Kitt Peak	Spacewatch	·	1.9 km	MPC · JPL
542512	2013 EY_{20}	—	June 5, 2010	ESA OGS	ESA OGS	·	1.7 km	MPC · JPL
542513	2013 EZ_{20}	—	September 4, 2011	Haleakala	Pan-STARRS 1	·	1.3 km	MPC · JPL
542514	2013 EE_{21}	—	April 4, 2003	Kitt Peak	Spacewatch	·	1.5 km	MPC · JPL
542515	2013 EH_{23}	—	June 16, 2001	Palomar	NEAT	·	1.7 km	MPC · JPL
542516	2013 EY_{26}	—	August 25, 2005	Palomar	NEAT	·	2.1 km	MPC · JPL
542517	2013 ES_{27}	—	October 10, 2002	Kitt Peak	Spacewatch	·	1.4 km	MPC · JPL
542518	2013 EX_{28}	—	March 31, 2008	Kitt Peak	Spacewatch	EOS	1.8 km	MPC · JPL
542519	2013 ES_{36}	—	September 30, 1995	Kitt Peak	Spacewatch	·	1.3 km	MPC · JPL
542520	2013 EL_{37}	—	February 22, 2002	Palomar	NEAT	·	2.5 km	MPC · JPL
542521	2013 ED_{42}	—	October 1, 2005	Catalina	CSS	·	2.1 km	MPC · JPL
542522	2013 ES_{42}	—	November 18, 2008	Kitt Peak	Spacewatch	NYS	780 m	MPC · JPL
542523	2013 EE_{46}	—	March 3, 2009	Mount Lemmon	Mount Lemmon Survey	·	1.3 km	MPC · JPL
542524	2013 EZ_{48}	—	September 24, 2011	Haleakala	Pan-STARRS 1	EUN	940 m	MPC · JPL
542525	2013 EY_{50}	—	February 26, 2004	Kitt Peak	Deep Ecliptic Survey	·	2.0 km	MPC · JPL
542526	2013 EX_{54}	—	September 17, 2010	Mount Lemmon	Mount Lemmon Survey	·	3.1 km	MPC · JPL
542527	2013 EY_{58}	—	March 8, 2013	Haleakala	Pan-STARRS 1	·	1.8 km	MPC · JPL
542528	2013 ET_{61}	—	October 6, 2004	Kitt Peak	Spacewatch	·	2.8 km	MPC · JPL
542529	2013 ET_{62}	—	June 8, 2005	Kitt Peak	Spacewatch	·	1.7 km	MPC · JPL
542530	2013 EB_{68}	—	April 11, 2004	Palomar	NEAT	·	2.0 km	MPC · JPL
542531	2013 ED_{69}	—	February 14, 2013	Haleakala	Pan-STARRS 1	·	720 m	MPC · JPL
542532	2013 EY_{69}	—	May 7, 2006	Mount Lemmon	Mount Lemmon Survey	·	800 m	MPC · JPL
542533	2013 EU_{70}	—	August 19, 2006	Kitt Peak	Spacewatch	·	1.6 km	MPC · JPL
542534	2013 EV_{70}	—	March 31, 2008	Kitt Peak	Spacewatch	HYG	2.5 km	MPC · JPL
542535	2013 EZ_{70}	—	February 15, 2013	Haleakala	Pan-STARRS 1	·	1.9 km	MPC · JPL
542536	2013 EW_{71}	—	March 10, 2005	Mount Lemmon	Mount Lemmon Survey	·	1.9 km	MPC · JPL
542537	2013 EG_{73}	—	September 16, 2002	Palomar	Matson, R. D.	·	2.0 km	MPC · JPL
542538	2013 ET_{75}	—	September 10, 2007	Mount Lemmon	Mount Lemmon Survey	·	1.1 km	MPC · JPL
542539	2013 EK_{77}	—	April 4, 2005	Mount Lemmon	Mount Lemmon Survey	·	900 m	MPC · JPL
542540	2013 EM_{77}	—	February 9, 2002	Kitt Peak	Spacewatch	·	1.1 km	MPC · JPL
542541	2013 EK_{78}	—	January 20, 2009	Kitt Peak	Spacewatch	NYS	1.3 km	MPC · JPL
542542	2013 ER_{83}	—	September 14, 2006	Eskridge	Tibbets, D.	·	2.3 km	MPC · JPL
542543	2013 ET_{85}	—	April 15, 2004	Palomar	NEAT	·	2.4 km	MPC · JPL
542544	2013 EN_{86}	—	December 21, 2006	Kitt Peak	L. H. Wasserman, M. W. Buie	·	2.7 km	MPC · JPL
542545	2013 EQ_{87}	—	January 19, 2002	Kitt Peak	Spacewatch	EOS	1.7 km	MPC · JPL
542546	2013 EW_{87}	—	October 26, 2011	Haleakala	Pan-STARRS 1	·	2.3 km	MPC · JPL
542547	2013 EM_{90}	—	January 19, 1994	Kitt Peak	Spacewatch	·	1.5 km	MPC · JPL
542548	2013 EP_{90}	—	April 4, 2002	Palomar	NEAT	·	1.7 km	MPC · JPL
542549	2013 EP_{91}	—	September 16, 2003	Kitt Peak	Spacewatch	·	1.2 km	MPC · JPL
542550	2013 EF_{92}	—	October 5, 2002	Palomar	NEAT	·	1.8 km	MPC · JPL
542551	2013 EZ_{92}	—	February 21, 2003	Palomar	NEAT	·	2.7 km	MPC · JPL
542552	2013 EH_{93}	—	March 12, 2013	Nogales	M. Schwartz, P. R. Holvorcem	H	540 m	MPC · JPL
542553	2013 ET_{96}	—	September 23, 2008	Kitt Peak	Spacewatch	·	610 m	MPC · JPL
542554	2013 EK_{97}	—	August 18, 2006	Kitt Peak	Spacewatch	·	1.5 km	MPC · JPL
542555	2013 ET_{100}	—	September 25, 2005	Kitt Peak	Spacewatch	GAL	1.4 km	MPC · JPL
542556	2013 EA_{102}	—	May 28, 2006	Catalina	CSS	·	1.7 km	MPC · JPL
542557	2013 EK_{102}	—	October 18, 2007	Kitt Peak	Spacewatch	·	1.0 km	MPC · JPL
542558	2013 EG_{103}	—	January 8, 2013	Kitt Peak	Spacewatch	·	950 m	MPC · JPL
542559	2013 EC_{104}	—	August 1, 2011	Haleakala	Pan-STARRS 1	·	1.6 km	MPC · JPL
542560	2013 EL_{104}	—	January 19, 2013	Mount Lemmon	Mount Lemmon Survey	·	910 m	MPC · JPL
542561 Ritajochen	2013 EB_{105}	Ritajochen	March 12, 2013	iTelescope	J. Jahn	·	1.6 km	MPC · JPL
542562	2013 ES_{105}	—	March 14, 2013	Catalina	CSS	·	2.1 km	MPC · JPL
542563	2013 EQ_{106}	—	December 21, 2003	Kitt Peak	Spacewatch	·	1.7 km	MPC · JPL
542564	2013 EX_{109}	—	September 21, 2003	Haleakala	NEAT	·	1.3 km	MPC · JPL
542565	2013 EM_{110}	—	October 5, 2002	Palomar	NEAT	·	1.6 km	MPC · JPL
542566	2013 EV_{110}	—	April 1, 2005	Anderson Mesa	LONEOS	·	1.5 km	MPC · JPL
542567	2013 ED_{111}	—	March 11, 2005	Kitt Peak	Spacewatch	·	1.5 km	MPC · JPL
542568 Erichess	2013 ET_{111}	Erichess	November 27, 2006	Mauna Kea	D. D. Balam, K. M. Perrett	·	1.7 km	MPC · JPL
542569	2013 EG_{112}	—	May 23, 2001	Cerro Tololo	Deep Ecliptic Survey	·	1.7 km	MPC · JPL
542570	2013 EH_{113}	—	March 5, 2013	Haleakala	Pan-STARRS 1	·	1.5 km	MPC · JPL
542571	2013 ER_{113}	—	September 26, 2011	Haleakala	Pan-STARRS 1	·	860 m	MPC · JPL
542572	2013 EM_{114}	—	February 10, 2007	Catalina	CSS	·	3.7 km	MPC · JPL
542573	2013 EW_{114}	—	April 25, 2006	Mount Lemmon	Mount Lemmon Survey	·	1.2 km	MPC · JPL
542574	2013 EZ_{114}	—	June 19, 2006	Mount Lemmon	Mount Lemmon Survey	·	1.2 km	MPC · JPL
542575	2013 EO_{119}	—	December 23, 2008	Dauban	C. Rinner, Kugel, F.	·	1.0 km	MPC · JPL
542576	2013 EJ_{124}	—	November 19, 2003	Palomar	NEAT	·	1.9 km	MPC · JPL
542577	2013 ET_{126}	—	September 24, 2011	Haleakala	Pan-STARRS 1	V	640 m	MPC · JPL
542578	2013 EP_{128}	—	March 14, 2013	Catalina	CSS	·	1.1 km	MPC · JPL
542579	2013 EL_{132}	—	October 14, 2010	Mount Lemmon	Mount Lemmon Survey	·	4.1 km	MPC · JPL
542580	2013 EG_{136}	—	September 18, 2006	Kitt Peak	Spacewatch	(7744)	1.1 km	MPC · JPL
542581	2013 EF_{141}	—	April 26, 2003	Kitt Peak	Spacewatch	THM	2.5 km	MPC · JPL
542582	2013 EA_{154}	—	January 1, 2009	Mount Lemmon	Mount Lemmon Survey	·	1.3 km	MPC · JPL
542583	2013 ED_{154}	—	October 19, 1995	Kitt Peak	Spacewatch	·	1.7 km	MPC · JPL
542584	2013 ET_{156}	—	March 5, 2013	Haleakala	Pan-STARRS 1	·	2.1 km	MPC · JPL
542585	2013 EO_{158}	—	October 29, 2006	Mount Lemmon	Mount Lemmon Survey	·	1.5 km	MPC · JPL
542586	2013 FD_{1}	—	October 24, 2011	Haleakala	Pan-STARRS 1	NYS	1.1 km	MPC · JPL
542587	2013 FR_{1}	—	November 7, 2002	Kitt Peak	Deep Ecliptic Survey	·	1.8 km	MPC · JPL
542588	2013 FU_{3}	—	November 30, 2011	Kitt Peak	Spacewatch	·	2.2 km	MPC · JPL
542589	2013 FN_{4}	—	January 10, 2007	Mount Lemmon	Mount Lemmon Survey	·	3.4 km	MPC · JPL
542590	2013 FP_{4}	—	January 27, 2007	Kitt Peak	Spacewatch	·	3.7 km	MPC · JPL
542591	2013 FR_{8}	—	May 4, 2005	Catalina	CSS	BRG	1.4 km	MPC · JPL
542592	2013 FC_{9}	—	April 19, 2009	Mount Lemmon	Mount Lemmon Survey	·	1.8 km	MPC · JPL
542593	2013 FE_{9}	—	July 28, 2011	Siding Spring	SSS	H	490 m	MPC · JPL
542594	2013 FE_{12}	—	March 19, 2013	Palomar	Palomar Transient Factory	·	1.8 km	MPC · JPL
542595	2013 FC_{14}	—	December 21, 2011	Črni Vrh	Skvarč, J.	·	2.1 km	MPC · JPL
542596	2013 FG_{14}	—	July 3, 2005	Palomar	NEAT	·	1.9 km	MPC · JPL
542597	2013 FN_{14}	—	April 10, 2004	Palomar	NEAT	·	2.1 km	MPC · JPL
542598	2013 FV_{15}	—	March 5, 2013	Kitt Peak	Spacewatch	·	2.8 km	MPC · JPL
542599	2013 FD_{18}	—	May 1, 2009	Mount Lemmon	Mount Lemmon Survey	HNS	1.2 km	MPC · JPL
542600 Lindahall	2013 FM_{19}	Lindahall	April 16, 2005	Vail-Jarnac	T. Glinos, D. H. Levy	ADE	2.3 km	MPC · JPL

== 542601–542700 ==
back to top

Designation			Discovery			Properties		Ref
Permanent	Provisional	Named after	Date	Site	Discoverer(s)	Category	Diam.	Ref
542601	2013 FE_{21}	—	March 19, 2013	Haleakala	Pan-STARRS 1	·	930 m	MPC · JPL
542602	2013 FA_{22}	—	May 19, 2005	Palomar	NEAT	·	1.2 km	MPC · JPL
542603	2013 FB_{22}	—	March 31, 2013	Mount Lemmon	Mount Lemmon Survey	·	2.0 km	MPC · JPL
542604	2013 FH_{24}	—	March 13, 2002	Palomar	NEAT	·	1.3 km	MPC · JPL
542605	2013 FS_{27}	—	March 14, 2013	Kitt Peak	Spacewatch	·	1.8 km	MPC · JPL
542606	2013 FJ_{29}	—	May 29, 2009	Mount Lemmon	Mount Lemmon Survey	·	1.4 km	MPC · JPL
542607	2013 GQ_{1}	—	March 10, 2007	Mount Lemmon	Mount Lemmon Survey	·	3.5 km	MPC · JPL
542608	2013 GC_{2}	—	March 13, 2013	Haleakala	Pan-STARRS 1	·	830 m	MPC · JPL
542609	2013 GK_{3}	—	September 21, 2006	Anderson Mesa	LONEOS	H	480 m	MPC · JPL
542610	2013 GZ_{4}	—	February 14, 2005	Kitt Peak	Spacewatch	·	1.0 km	MPC · JPL
542611	2013 GT_{5}	—	February 26, 2008	Mount Lemmon	Mount Lemmon Survey	AGN	1.0 km	MPC · JPL
542612	2013 GO_{6}	—	April 2, 2013	Kitt Peak	Spacewatch	·	1.9 km	MPC · JPL
542613	2013 GR_{6}	—	August 13, 2004	Cerro Tololo	Deep Ecliptic Survey	·	2.4 km	MPC · JPL
542614	2013 GV_{6}	—	April 3, 2013	Palomar	Palomar Transient Factory	PHO	940 m	MPC · JPL
542615	2013 GH_{7}	—	February 9, 2007	Catalina	CSS	·	3.7 km	MPC · JPL
542616	2013 GM_{7}	—	March 12, 2013	Nogales	M. Schwartz, P. R. Holvorcem	·	1.5 km	MPC · JPL
542617	2013 GZ_{10}	—	April 25, 2006	Mount Lemmon	Mount Lemmon Survey	·	760 m	MPC · JPL
542618	2013 GO_{18}	—	December 14, 2007	Dauban	Rinner, C., Kugel F.	·	1.9 km	MPC · JPL
542619	2013 GB_{19}	—	April 5, 2013	Palomar	Palomar Transient Factory	EOS	2.0 km	MPC · JPL
542620	2013 GM_{21}	—	August 27, 2006	Kitt Peak	Spacewatch	·	1.3 km	MPC · JPL
542621	2013 GZ_{22}	—	April 7, 2013	Haleakala	Pan-STARRS 1	H	310 m	MPC · JPL
542622	2013 GJ_{27}	—	August 30, 2005	Kitt Peak	Spacewatch	·	3.6 km	MPC · JPL
542623	2013 GQ_{27}	—	October 12, 2010	Mount Lemmon	Mount Lemmon Survey	·	2.3 km	MPC · JPL
542624	2013 GM_{29}	—	October 31, 2005	Mauna Kea	A. Boattini	·	850 m	MPC · JPL
542625	2013 GP_{32}	—	July 18, 2005	Palomar	NEAT	HOF	2.6 km	MPC · JPL
542626	2013 GO_{33}	—	July 3, 2003	Kitt Peak	Spacewatch	HYG	2.6 km	MPC · JPL
542627	2013 GK_{37}	—	November 2, 2004	Anderson Mesa	LONEOS	·	1.2 km	MPC · JPL
542628	2013 GB_{41}	—	October 24, 2011	Haleakala	Pan-STARRS 1	KON	1.6 km	MPC · JPL
542629	2013 GE_{41}	—	October 19, 2001	Palomar	NEAT	·	2.3 km	MPC · JPL
542630	2013 GR_{41}	—	May 13, 2005	Siding Spring	SSS	·	1.8 km	MPC · JPL
542631	2013 GB_{44}	—	May 6, 2008	Mount Lemmon	Mount Lemmon Survey	·	2.5 km	MPC · JPL
542632	2013 GT_{44}	—	October 2, 2006	Mount Lemmon	Mount Lemmon Survey	·	1.2 km	MPC · JPL
542633	2013 GJ_{46}	—	August 18, 2006	Palomar	NEAT	(5)	1.6 km	MPC · JPL
542634	2013 GD_{49}	—	September 13, 2007	Mount Lemmon	Mount Lemmon Survey	V	510 m	MPC · JPL
542635	2013 GS_{49}	—	April 5, 2003	Kitt Peak	Spacewatch	·	870 m	MPC · JPL
542636	2013 GL_{50}	—	August 22, 2003	Palomar	NEAT	HYG	3.4 km	MPC · JPL
542637	2013 GD_{51}	—	October 2, 2006	Mount Lemmon	Mount Lemmon Survey	(11882)	1.7 km	MPC · JPL
542638	2013 GO_{52}	—	August 25, 2005	Palomar	NEAT	615	1.5 km	MPC · JPL
542639	2013 GT_{52}	—	September 19, 2006	Kitt Peak	Spacewatch	·	1.1 km	MPC · JPL
542640	2013 GJ_{53}	—	October 26, 2011	Haleakala	Pan-STARRS 1	·	1.1 km	MPC · JPL
542641	2013 GL_{53}	—	November 3, 2007	Mount Lemmon	Mount Lemmon Survey	·	1.2 km	MPC · JPL
542642	2013 GR_{55}	—	April 13, 2002	Palomar	NEAT	·	1.2 km	MPC · JPL
542643	2013 GL_{56}	—	February 11, 2008	Mount Lemmon	Mount Lemmon Survey	·	1.9 km	MPC · JPL
542644	2013 GP_{57}	—	August 29, 2006	Kitt Peak	Spacewatch	·	1.4 km	MPC · JPL
542645	2013 GT_{58}	—	April 6, 2013	Mount Lemmon	Mount Lemmon Survey	·	1.2 km	MPC · JPL
542646	2013 GJ_{60}	—	March 11, 2005	Mount Lemmon	Mount Lemmon Survey	·	1.3 km	MPC · JPL
542647	2013 GS_{60}	—	April 27, 2008	Mount Lemmon	Mount Lemmon Survey	·	1.4 km	MPC · JPL
542648	2013 GX_{60}	—	January 28, 2009	Catalina	CSS	ERI	1.3 km	MPC · JPL
542649	2013 GW_{62}	—	April 7, 2013	Mount Lemmon	Mount Lemmon Survey	·	550 m	MPC · JPL
542650	2013 GA_{63}	—	October 9, 2010	Mount Lemmon	Mount Lemmon Survey	·	1.4 km	MPC · JPL
542651	2013 GH_{64}	—	December 4, 2008	Kitt Peak	Spacewatch	·	830 m	MPC · JPL
542652	2013 GL_{64}	—	December 2, 2010	Mount Lemmon	Mount Lemmon Survey	·	2.5 km	MPC · JPL
542653	2013 GR_{64}	—	October 12, 2010	Mount Lemmon	Mount Lemmon Survey	·	2.8 km	MPC · JPL
542654	2013 GX_{65}	—	September 2, 2010	Mount Lemmon	Mount Lemmon Survey	·	1.3 km	MPC · JPL
542655	2013 GF_{68}	—	June 3, 2008	Mount Lemmon	Mount Lemmon Survey	·	2.6 km	MPC · JPL
542656	2013 GV_{69}	—	April 14, 2005	Kitt Peak	Spacewatch	(5)	1.3 km	MPC · JPL
542657	2013 GN_{70}	—	April 8, 2013	Mount Lemmon	Mount Lemmon Survey	EUP	3.0 km	MPC · JPL
542658	2013 GJ_{71}	—	April 10, 2013	Haleakala	Pan-STARRS 1	·	790 m	MPC · JPL
542659	2013 GF_{78}	—	April 13, 2013	Haleakala	Pan-STARRS 1	H	520 m	MPC · JPL
542660	2013 GV_{78}	—	December 5, 2005	Kitt Peak	Spacewatch	·	1.7 km	MPC · JPL
542661	2013 GA_{79}	—	April 12, 2013	Haleakala	Pan-STARRS 1	·	2.9 km	MPC · JPL
542662	2013 GZ_{81}	—	August 4, 2005	Palomar	NEAT	·	2.5 km	MPC · JPL
542663	2013 GK_{82}	—	May 11, 2005	Palomar	NEAT	·	1.4 km	MPC · JPL
542664	2013 GJ_{83}	—	August 31, 2005	Palomar	NEAT	·	2.3 km	MPC · JPL
542665	2013 GT_{84}	—	April 11, 2002	Palomar	NEAT	·	4.6 km	MPC · JPL
542666	2013 GY_{84}	—	January 3, 2012	Mount Lemmon	Mount Lemmon Survey	VER	2.9 km	MPC · JPL
542667	2013 GC_{85}	—	July 6, 2005	Reedy Creek	J. Broughton	EUN	1.9 km	MPC · JPL
542668	2013 GE_{85}	—	October 28, 2010	Mount Lemmon	Mount Lemmon Survey	·	3.7 km	MPC · JPL
542669	2013 GJ_{85}	—	November 1, 2010	Bisei	BATTeRS	·	1.4 km	MPC · JPL
542670	2013 GV_{85}	—	April 14, 2004	Kitt Peak	Spacewatch	·	2.2 km	MPC · JPL
542671	2013 GD_{86}	—	April 14, 2013	Palomar	Palomar Transient Factory	·	3.0 km	MPC · JPL
542672	2013 GZ_{86}	—	January 14, 2012	Kitt Peak	Spacewatch	·	2.7 km	MPC · JPL
542673	2013 GC_{89}	—	November 2, 2007	Mount Lemmon	Mount Lemmon Survey	·	1.2 km	MPC · JPL
542674	2013 GA_{90}	—	August 27, 2005	Palomar	NEAT	PAD	1.8 km	MPC · JPL
542675	2013 GN_{92}	—	April 14, 2002	Palomar	NEAT	·	870 m	MPC · JPL
542676	2013 GP_{95}	—	April 8, 2002	Palomar	NEAT	·	4.2 km	MPC · JPL
542677	2013 GQ_{98}	—	December 1, 2005	Kitt Peak	Wasserman, L. H., Millis, R. L.	·	770 m	MPC · JPL
542678	2013 GY_{99}	—	November 30, 2010	Mount Lemmon	Mount Lemmon Survey	T_{j} (2.97) · 3:2	6.0 km	MPC · JPL
542679	2013 GM_{100}	—	April 12, 2013	Haleakala	Pan-STARRS 1	PHO	1.0 km	MPC · JPL
542680	2013 GG_{101}	—	December 25, 2011	Piszkéstető	K. Sárneczky	EUN	1.3 km	MPC · JPL
542681	2013 GU_{103}	—	October 31, 2010	Mount Lemmon	Mount Lemmon Survey	·	3.1 km	MPC · JPL
542682	2013 GG_{105}	—	January 17, 2001	Kitt Peak	Spacewatch	·	1.8 km	MPC · JPL
542683	2013 GL_{105}	—	May 19, 2005	Siding Spring	SSS	·	1.5 km	MPC · JPL
542684	2013 GF_{107}	—	May 7, 2002	Anderson Mesa	LONEOS	·	3.4 km	MPC · JPL
542685	2013 GE_{108}	—	November 6, 2010	Mount Lemmon	Mount Lemmon Survey	·	2.1 km	MPC · JPL
542686	2013 GS_{108}	—	May 10, 2005	Mount Lemmon	Mount Lemmon Survey	·	950 m	MPC · JPL
542687	2013 GC_{109}	—	August 19, 2006	Kitt Peak	Spacewatch	·	1.5 km	MPC · JPL
542688	2013 GH_{110}	—	March 11, 2002	Palomar	NEAT	·	3.1 km	MPC · JPL
542689	2013 GL_{110}	—	February 15, 2004	Catalina	CSS	·	1.8 km	MPC · JPL
542690	2013 GO_{111}	—	April 9, 2003	Kitt Peak	Spacewatch	·	2.3 km	MPC · JPL
542691	2013 GS_{111}	—	January 20, 2012	Mount Lemmon	Mount Lemmon Survey	·	3.9 km	MPC · JPL
542692	2013 GH_{113}	—	April 12, 2002	Kitt Peak	Spacewatch	·	3.7 km	MPC · JPL
542693	2013 GR_{113}	—	December 2, 2005	Mauna Kea	A. Boattini	·	730 m	MPC · JPL
542694	2013 GQ_{114}	—	October 12, 1999	Kitt Peak	Spacewatch	·	900 m	MPC · JPL
542695	2013 GB_{115}	—	November 2, 2010	Kitt Peak	Spacewatch	·	1.9 km	MPC · JPL
542696	2013 GE_{117}	—	July 5, 2005	Mount Lemmon	Mount Lemmon Survey	·	1.9 km	MPC · JPL
542697	2013 GH_{121}	—	April 8, 2013	Mount Lemmon	Mount Lemmon Survey	EUN	1.2 km	MPC · JPL
542698	2013 GJ_{121}	—	April 8, 2013	Mount Lemmon	Mount Lemmon Survey	HOF	2.1 km	MPC · JPL
542699	2013 GE_{122}	—	March 18, 2013	Kitt Peak	Spacewatch	·	1.2 km	MPC · JPL
542700	2013 GP_{122}	—	September 20, 2006	Catalina	CSS	HNS	1.3 km	MPC · JPL

== 542701–542800 ==
back to top

Designation			Discovery			Properties		Ref
Permanent	Provisional	Named after	Date	Site	Discoverer(s)	Category	Diam.	Ref
542701	2013 GY_{127}	—	April 14, 2013	Mount Lemmon	Mount Lemmon Survey	·	1.2 km	MPC · JPL
542702	2013 GX_{130}	—	April 4, 2002	Palomar	NEAT	·	4.1 km	MPC · JPL
542703	2013 GP_{131}	—	March 5, 2013	Haleakala	Pan-STARRS 1	·	1.2 km	MPC · JPL
542704	2013 GP_{132}	—	July 21, 2006	Mount Lemmon	Mount Lemmon Survey	(5)	1.4 km	MPC · JPL
542705	2013 GS_{132}	—	October 20, 2007	Mount Lemmon	Mount Lemmon Survey	·	1.3 km	MPC · JPL
542706	2013 GZ_{133}	—	April 15, 2008	Mount Lemmon	Mount Lemmon Survey	·	2.5 km	MPC · JPL
542707	2013 GE_{134}	—	July 29, 2005	Palomar	NEAT	·	1.8 km	MPC · JPL
542708	2013 GY_{134}	—	April 8, 2013	Mount Lemmon	Mount Lemmon Survey	HNS	1.1 km	MPC · JPL
542709	2013 GJ_{136}	—	March 5, 2013	Haleakala	Pan-STARRS 1	·	2.8 km	MPC · JPL
542710	2013 GK_{139}	—	June 23, 2009	Mount Lemmon	Mount Lemmon Survey	·	1.9 km	MPC · JPL
542711	2013 GC_{140}	—	April 15, 2013	Haleakala	Pan-STARRS 1	·	1.4 km	MPC · JPL
542712	2013 GH_{140}	—	February 13, 2008	Kitt Peak	Spacewatch	·	1.5 km	MPC · JPL
542713	2013 GK_{141}	—	October 17, 2010	Mount Lemmon	Mount Lemmon Survey	·	2.1 km	MPC · JPL
542714	2013 GO_{141}	—	April 10, 2013	Haleakala	Pan-STARRS 1	·	870 m	MPC · JPL
542715	2013 GR_{141}	—	April 5, 2013	Haleakala	Pan-STARRS 1	·	1.1 km	MPC · JPL
542716	2013 GX_{141}	—	March 16, 2007	Kitt Peak	Spacewatch	·	2.8 km	MPC · JPL
542717	2013 HJ_{1}	—	July 29, 2005	Palomar	NEAT	·	2.0 km	MPC · JPL
542718	2013 HK_{1}	—	February 11, 2008	Kitt Peak	Spacewatch	·	1.6 km	MPC · JPL
542719	2013 HS_{2}	—	September 15, 2009	Mount Lemmon	Mount Lemmon Survey	·	3.2 km	MPC · JPL
542720	2013 HA_{3}	—	January 28, 2007	Mount Lemmon	Mount Lemmon Survey	·	3.3 km	MPC · JPL
542721	2013 HR_{3}	—	April 14, 2013	Mount Lemmon	Mount Lemmon Survey	·	2.7 km	MPC · JPL
542722	2013 HO_{4}	—	April 18, 2013	Palomar	Palomar Transient Factory	·	3.0 km	MPC · JPL
542723	2013 HS_{4}	—	March 31, 2008	Mount Lemmon	Mount Lemmon Survey	·	3.0 km	MPC · JPL
542724	2013 HH_{6}	—	April 8, 2013	Kitt Peak	Spacewatch	HNS	980 m	MPC · JPL
542725	2013 HN_{8}	—	November 18, 2006	Mount Lemmon	Mount Lemmon Survey	·	1.7 km	MPC · JPL
542726	2013 HR_{9}	—	May 6, 2002	Palomar	NEAT	·	4.3 km	MPC · JPL
542727	2013 HJ_{12}	—	May 1, 2004	Kitt Peak	Spacewatch	·	2.3 km	MPC · JPL
542728	2013 HT_{12}	—	October 28, 2011	Mount Lemmon	Mount Lemmon Survey	·	1.6 km	MPC · JPL
542729	2013 HD_{15}	—	April 13, 2013	Kitt Peak	Spacewatch	H	490 m	MPC · JPL
542730	2013 HO_{15}	—	August 18, 2001	Palomar	NEAT	·	2.3 km	MPC · JPL
542731	2013 HM_{19}	—	August 4, 2005	Palomar	NEAT	·	2.8 km	MPC · JPL
542732	2013 HU_{20}	—	September 20, 2006	Kitt Peak	Spacewatch	EUN	1.5 km	MPC · JPL
542733	2013 HW_{20}	—	February 7, 2008	Mount Lemmon	Mount Lemmon Survey	·	2.0 km	MPC · JPL
542734	2013 HD_{21}	—	March 19, 2013	Haleakala	Pan-STARRS 1	H	340 m	MPC · JPL
542735	2013 HJ_{22}	—	April 9, 2013	Haleakala	Pan-STARRS 1	·	1.6 km	MPC · JPL
542736	2013 HM_{24}	—	December 19, 2007	Mount Lemmon	Mount Lemmon Survey	DOR	2.0 km	MPC · JPL
542737	2013 HO_{24}	—	September 18, 2006	Kitt Peak	Spacewatch	·	1.6 km	MPC · JPL
542738	2013 HL_{26}	—	September 27, 2006	Mount Lemmon	Mount Lemmon Survey	H	410 m	MPC · JPL
542739	2013 HW_{26}	—	April 12, 2013	Nogales	M. Schwartz, P. R. Holvorcem	·	2.0 km	MPC · JPL
542740	2013 HR_{28}	—	April 20, 2013	Mount Lemmon	Mount Lemmon Survey	·	1.0 km	MPC · JPL
542741	2013 HT_{28}	—	January 1, 2012	Mount Lemmon	Mount Lemmon Survey	·	1.9 km	MPC · JPL
542742	2013 HB_{29}	—	February 26, 2012	La Palma	La Palma	TIR	3.3 km	MPC · JPL
542743	2013 HD_{29}	—	July 8, 2003	Kitt Peak	Spacewatch	·	3.9 km	MPC · JPL
542744	2013 HY_{30}	—	October 1, 2011	Kitt Peak	Spacewatch	·	1 km	MPC · JPL
542745	2013 HB_{31}	—	August 28, 2006	Kitt Peak	Spacewatch	·	1.1 km	MPC · JPL
542746	2013 HE_{35}	—	September 18, 2003	Palomar	NEAT	·	3.4 km	MPC · JPL
542747	2013 HL_{35}	—	August 19, 2001	Cerro Tololo	Deep Ecliptic Survey	·	1.3 km	MPC · JPL
542748	2013 HL_{40}	—	September 15, 2003	Palomar	NEAT	·	1.5 km	MPC · JPL
542749	2013 HO_{43}	—	May 3, 2009	Kitt Peak	Spacewatch	·	1.2 km	MPC · JPL
542750	2013 HQ_{46}	—	September 15, 2009	Catalina	CSS	·	2.5 km	MPC · JPL
542751	2013 HL_{47}	—	April 9, 2013	Haleakala	Pan-STARRS 1	·	940 m	MPC · JPL
542752	2013 HM_{47}	—	August 28, 2006	Lulin	LUSS	·	1.4 km	MPC · JPL
542753	2013 HY_{47}	—	April 16, 2013	Cerro Tololo	DECam	·	1.6 km	MPC · JPL
542754	2013 HK_{51}	—	October 8, 2005	Moletai	K. Černis, Zdanavicius, J.	·	2.0 km	MPC · JPL
542755	2013 HL_{53}	—	September 12, 2010	Mount Lemmon	Mount Lemmon Survey	·	1.6 km	MPC · JPL
542756	2013 HR_{53}	—	April 30, 2013	Mount Lemmon	Mount Lemmon Survey	H	390 m	MPC · JPL
542757	2013 HN_{54}	—	October 17, 2006	Kitt Peak	Spacewatch	·	1.2 km	MPC · JPL
542758	2013 HF_{56}	—	October 10, 2010	Mount Lemmon	Mount Lemmon Survey	·	1.2 km	MPC · JPL
542759	2013 HL_{61}	—	April 9, 2013	Haleakala	Pan-STARRS 1	·	1.7 km	MPC · JPL
542760	2013 HE_{70}	—	September 16, 2010	Mount Lemmon	Mount Lemmon Survey	EOS	1.7 km	MPC · JPL
542761	2013 HP_{76}	—	April 15, 2013	Calar Alto	F. Hormuth	·	910 m	MPC · JPL
542762 Davidlee	2013 HU_{77}	Davidlee	August 5, 2005	Mauna Kea	P. A. Wiegert, D. D. Balam	·	1.5 km	MPC · JPL
542763	2013 HT_{81}	—	November 20, 2006	Kitt Peak	Spacewatch	PAD	1.5 km	MPC · JPL
542764	2013 HU_{94}	—	October 25, 2003	Kitt Peak	Spacewatch	·	770 m	MPC · JPL
542765	2013 HA_{98}	—	March 26, 2009	Kitt Peak	Spacewatch	·	870 m	MPC · JPL
542766	2013 HJ_{117}	—	October 22, 2011	Mount Lemmon	Mount Lemmon Survey	·	740 m	MPC · JPL
542767	2013 HP_{117}	—	September 14, 2006	Kitt Peak	Spacewatch	(17392)	1.4 km	MPC · JPL
542768	2013 HN_{122}	—	August 19, 2010	Kitt Peak	Spacewatch	·	2.3 km	MPC · JPL
542769	2013 HZ_{131}	—	October 7, 2001	Palomar	NEAT	·	1.6 km	MPC · JPL
542770	2013 HF_{132}	—	April 16, 2013	Siding Spring	SSS	MAR	890 m	MPC · JPL
542771	2013 HD_{140}	—	August 22, 2004	Kitt Peak	Spacewatch	EOS	1.6 km	MPC · JPL
542772	2013 HZ_{144}	—	November 2, 2007	Mount Lemmon	Mount Lemmon Survey	·	1.2 km	MPC · JPL
542773	2013 HD_{147}	—	October 1, 2005	Mount Lemmon	Mount Lemmon Survey	KOR	1.1 km	MPC · JPL
542774	2013 HP_{147}	—	September 25, 2006	Mount Lemmon	Mount Lemmon Survey	·	970 m	MPC · JPL
542775	2013 HL_{148}	—	October 21, 1997	Kitt Peak	Spacewatch	(45637)	3.4 km	MPC · JPL
542776	2013 HW_{149}	—	April 2, 2013	Mount Lemmon	Mount Lemmon Survey	·	1.3 km	MPC · JPL
542777	2013 HY_{157}	—	June 11, 2005	Kitt Peak	Spacewatch	·	1.1 km	MPC · JPL
542778	2013 JV_{1}	—	March 12, 2013	Mount Lemmon	Mount Lemmon Survey	H	470 m	MPC · JPL
542779	2013 JZ_{1}	—	November 20, 2006	Mount Lemmon	Mount Lemmon Survey	·	4.2 km	MPC · JPL
542780	2013 JZ_{2}	—	December 13, 2006	Kitt Peak	Spacewatch	H	610 m	MPC · JPL
542781	2013 JN_{3}	—	April 16, 2013	Siding Spring	SSS	KRM	2.1 km	MPC · JPL
542782	2013 JS_{4}	—	May 1, 2013	Mount Lemmon	Mount Lemmon Survey	BRA	1.6 km	MPC · JPL
542783	2013 JX_{5}	—	October 27, 2006	Mount Lemmon	Mount Lemmon Survey	H	420 m	MPC · JPL
542784	2013 JJ_{6}	—	May 1, 2009	Mount Lemmon	Mount Lemmon Survey	·	1.0 km	MPC · JPL
542785	2013 JU_{6}	—	March 18, 2013	Palomar	Palomar Transient Factory	H	600 m	MPC · JPL
542786	2013 JK_{8}	—	August 16, 2002	Palomar	NEAT	·	1.6 km	MPC · JPL
542787	2013 JQ_{11}	—	October 31, 2006	Mount Lemmon	Mount Lemmon Survey	·	1.5 km	MPC · JPL
542788	2013 JD_{13}	—	October 19, 2011	Mount Lemmon	Mount Lemmon Survey	H	440 m	MPC · JPL
542789	2013 JC_{15}	—	October 30, 2009	Mount Lemmon	Mount Lemmon Survey	L4	9.4 km	MPC · JPL
542790	2013 JB_{18}	—	May 10, 2013	Haleakala	Pan-STARRS 1	H	320 m	MPC · JPL
542791	2013 JL_{19}	—	September 25, 2003	Gnosca	S. Sposetti	·	920 m	MPC · JPL
542792	2013 JQ_{20}	—	May 10, 2013	Kitt Peak	Spacewatch	·	1.7 km	MPC · JPL
542793	2013 JY_{20}	—	May 10, 2013	Elena Remote	Oreshko, A.	MAR	880 m	MPC · JPL
542794	2013 JG_{24}	—	August 26, 2005	Palomar	NEAT	·	2.7 km	MPC · JPL
542795	2013 JQ_{27}	—	April 12, 2002	Palomar	NEAT	·	4.1 km	MPC · JPL
542796	2013 JL_{31}	—	March 15, 2013	Mount Lemmon	Mount Lemmon Survey	HNS	1.1 km	MPC · JPL
542797	2013 JQ_{31}	—	July 1, 2001	Palomar	NEAT	MAR	1.4 km	MPC · JPL
542798	2013 JX_{31}	—	May 12, 2013	Kitt Peak	Spacewatch	·	1.8 km	MPC · JPL
542799	2013 JX_{34}	—	June 3, 2005	Kitt Peak	Spacewatch	H	520 m	MPC · JPL
542800	2013 JJ_{37}	—	October 12, 2004	Moletai	K. Černis, Zdanavicius, J.	·	3.6 km	MPC · JPL

== 542801–542900 ==
back to top

Designation			Discovery			Properties		Ref
Permanent	Provisional	Named after	Date	Site	Discoverer(s)	Category	Diam.	Ref
542801	2013 JA_{38}	—	September 26, 2011	Kitt Peak	Spacewatch	H	510 m	MPC · JPL
542802	2013 JH_{38}	—	April 19, 2013	Haleakala	Pan-STARRS 1	EOS	1.6 km	MPC · JPL
542803	2013 JY_{38}	—	December 1, 2005	Kitt Peak	Wasserman, L. H., Millis, R. L.	·	3.6 km	MPC · JPL
542804	2013 JC_{40}	—	January 11, 2011	Mount Lemmon	Mount Lemmon Survey	·	2.5 km	MPC · JPL
542805	2013 JD_{40}	—	January 19, 2012	Kitt Peak	Spacewatch	EOS	1.7 km	MPC · JPL
542806	2013 JU_{43}	—	May 11, 2013	Mount Lemmon	Mount Lemmon Survey	·	1.5 km	MPC · JPL
542807	2013 JJ_{44}	—	August 1, 2005	Siding Spring	SSS	ADE	2.0 km	MPC · JPL
542808	2013 JK_{44}	—	April 16, 2013	Haleakala	Pan-STARRS 1	·	1.6 km	MPC · JPL
542809	2013 JO_{44}	—	April 7, 2013	Mount Lemmon	Mount Lemmon Survey	·	1.5 km	MPC · JPL
542810	2013 JN_{45}	—	May 12, 2013	Kitt Peak	Spacewatch	·	1.2 km	MPC · JPL
542811	2013 JC_{48}	—	July 27, 2005	Palomar	NEAT	·	2.6 km	MPC · JPL
542812	2013 JU_{48}	—	May 14, 2013	Nogales	M. Schwartz, P. R. Holvorcem	·	790 m	MPC · JPL
542813	2013 JY_{48}	—	November 14, 2010	Mount Lemmon	Mount Lemmon Survey	·	2.6 km	MPC · JPL
542814	2013 JJ_{49}	—	March 3, 2009	Mount Lemmon	Mount Lemmon Survey	·	1.1 km	MPC · JPL
542815	2013 JX_{49}	—	March 13, 2007	Mount Lemmon	Mount Lemmon Survey	·	2.7 km	MPC · JPL
542816	2013 JD_{53}	—	July 30, 2010	WISE	WISE	HOF	2.4 km	MPC · JPL
542817	2013 JK_{53}	—	October 31, 2010	Kitt Peak	Spacewatch	URS	3.0 km	MPC · JPL
542818	2013 JQ_{56}	—	September 28, 2003	Kitt Peak	Spacewatch	·	1.4 km	MPC · JPL
542819	2013 JT_{56}	—	January 2, 2012	Kitt Peak	Spacewatch	·	1.4 km	MPC · JPL
542820	2013 JF_{57}	—	March 11, 2008	Kitt Peak	Spacewatch	·	1.5 km	MPC · JPL
542821	2013 JG_{57}	—	April 7, 2008	Mount Lemmon	Mount Lemmon Survey	·	2.0 km	MPC · JPL
542822	2013 JQ_{60}	—	October 2, 2006	Mount Lemmon	Mount Lemmon Survey	·	1.5 km	MPC · JPL
542823	2013 JR_{61}	—	May 8, 2013	Haleakala	Pan-STARRS 1	MIS	2.2 km	MPC · JPL
542824	2013 JF_{63}	—	January 24, 2012	Haleakala	Pan-STARRS 1	·	3.7 km	MPC · JPL
542825	2013 JH_{63}	—	October 22, 2011	Mount Lemmon	Mount Lemmon Survey	HNS	1.6 km	MPC · JPL
542826	2013 JL_{63}	—	April 21, 2002	Palomar	NEAT	·	3.8 km	MPC · JPL
542827	2013 JM_{66}	—	May 2, 2013	Kitt Peak	Spacewatch	WIT	920 m	MPC · JPL
542828	2013 JU_{67}	—	May 15, 2013	Haleakala	Pan-STARRS 1	·	1.5 km	MPC · JPL
542829	2013 KS	—	August 19, 2001	Cerro Tololo	Deep Ecliptic Survey	·	1.6 km	MPC · JPL
542830	2013 KH_{1}	—	May 17, 2013	Mount Lemmon	Mount Lemmon Survey	·	4.1 km	MPC · JPL
542831	2013 KL_{1}	—	May 28, 2008	Mount Lemmon	Mount Lemmon Survey	H	450 m	MPC · JPL
542832	2013 KQ_{4}	—	May 16, 2013	Mount Lemmon	Mount Lemmon Survey	HNS	940 m	MPC · JPL
542833	2013 KH_{7}	—	August 5, 2001	Haleakala	NEAT	·	1.2 km	MPC · JPL
542834	2013 KQ_{7}	—	July 18, 2001	Palomar	NEAT	·	1.7 km	MPC · JPL
542835	2013 KR_{7}	—	October 25, 2011	Haleakala	Pan-STARRS 1	H	550 m	MPC · JPL
542836	2013 KV_{7}	—	May 31, 2013	Nogales	M. Schwartz, P. R. Holvorcem	EUN	1.0 km	MPC · JPL
542837	2013 KD_{8}	—	July 28, 2001	Anderson Mesa	LONEOS	·	1.3 km	MPC · JPL
542838	2013 KL_{9}	—	May 31, 2013	Mount Lemmon	Mount Lemmon Survey	·	3.0 km	MPC · JPL
542839	2013 KH_{10}	—	March 11, 2007	Kitt Peak	Spacewatch	·	2.4 km	MPC · JPL
542840	2013 KP_{10}	—	November 19, 2004	Anderson Mesa	LONEOS	·	4.7 km	MPC · JPL
542841	2013 KV_{10}	—	May 18, 2002	Palomar	NEAT	·	3.4 km	MPC · JPL
542842	2013 KW_{10}	—	January 20, 2012	Kitt Peak	Spacewatch	EOS	2.0 km	MPC · JPL
542843	2013 KU_{12}	—	May 16, 2013	Haleakala	Pan-STARRS 1	DOR	2.5 km	MPC · JPL
542844	2013 KS_{13}	—	December 6, 2005	Kitt Peak	Spacewatch	·	1.9 km	MPC · JPL
542845	2013 KF_{16}	—	September 18, 2003	Palomar	NEAT	·	810 m	MPC · JPL
542846	2013 KT_{16}	—	September 4, 2003	Kitt Peak	Spacewatch	·	2.5 km	MPC · JPL
542847	2013 KE_{17}	—	May 31, 2013	Haleakala	Pan-STARRS 1	·	2.6 km	MPC · JPL
542848	2013 KN_{18}	—	May 31, 2013	Mount Lemmon	Mount Lemmon Survey	·	2.2 km	MPC · JPL
542849	2013 LM_{1}	—	May 22, 2013	Mount Lemmon	Mount Lemmon Survey	·	4.0 km	MPC · JPL
542850	2013 LJ_{3}	—	June 1, 2013	Kitt Peak	Spacewatch	·	1.5 km	MPC · JPL
542851	2013 LO_{4}	—	March 30, 2003	Anderson Mesa	LONEOS	·	720 m	MPC · JPL
542852	2013 LQ_{4}	—	October 30, 2007	Kitt Peak	Spacewatch	·	1.2 km	MPC · JPL
542853	2013 LV_{4}	—	July 22, 2001	Palomar	NEAT	(5)	1.4 km	MPC · JPL
542854	2013 LJ_{7}	—	November 18, 2008	Kitt Peak	Spacewatch	H	560 m	MPC · JPL
542855	2013 LO_{8}	—	February 23, 2012	Mount Lemmon	Mount Lemmon Survey	·	1.4 km	MPC · JPL
542856	2013 LM_{10}	—	June 29, 2005	Palomar	NEAT	EUN	1.2 km	MPC · JPL
542857 Elmi	2013 LP_{14}	Elmi	December 26, 2006	Mauna Kea	D. D. Balam, K. M. Perrett	·	2.0 km	MPC · JPL
542858	2013 LZ_{14}	—	January 2, 2012	Kitt Peak	Spacewatch	JUN	1.2 km	MPC · JPL
542859	2013 LE_{15}	—	August 17, 2001	Palomar	NEAT	EUN	1.2 km	MPC · JPL
542860	2013 LK_{16}	—	September 15, 2002	Palomar	NEAT	·	1.2 km	MPC · JPL
542861	2013 LU_{16}	—	December 26, 2011	Mount Lemmon	Mount Lemmon Survey	·	2.3 km	MPC · JPL
542862	2013 LD_{18}	—	November 8, 2010	Mount Lemmon	Mount Lemmon Survey	·	1.9 km	MPC · JPL
542863	2013 LR_{19}	—	October 16, 2003	Kitt Peak	Spacewatch	NYS	1.2 km	MPC · JPL
542864	2013 LP_{20}	—	June 23, 2005	Palomar	NEAT	·	1.9 km	MPC · JPL
542865	2013 LU_{20}	—	October 4, 2005	Mount Lemmon	Mount Lemmon Survey	·	2.0 km	MPC · JPL
542866	2013 LY_{22}	—	June 9, 2006	Palomar	NEAT	·	1.0 km	MPC · JPL
542867	2013 LK_{24}	—	January 27, 2004	Kitt Peak	Spacewatch	·	1.5 km	MPC · JPL
542868	2013 LY_{25}	—	December 20, 2006	Palomar	NEAT	·	1.8 km	MPC · JPL
542869	2013 LR_{28}	—	November 3, 2010	Mount Lemmon	Mount Lemmon Survey	·	1.4 km	MPC · JPL
542870	2013 LA_{29}	—	November 25, 2011	Haleakala	Pan-STARRS 1	H	450 m	MPC · JPL
542871	2013 LT_{31}	—	May 17, 2005	Mount Lemmon	Mount Lemmon Survey	H	490 m	MPC · JPL
542872	2013 LT_{32}	—	June 12, 2013	Kitt Peak	Spacewatch	EUN	1.0 km	MPC · JPL
542873	2013 LW_{32}	—	May 14, 2008	Mount Lemmon	Mount Lemmon Survey	·	2.9 km	MPC · JPL
542874	2013 LL_{33}	—	May 16, 2013	Haleakala	Pan-STARRS 1	·	2.2 km	MPC · JPL
542875	2013 LN_{34}	—	September 30, 2003	Kitt Peak	Spacewatch	·	3.5 km	MPC · JPL
542876	2013 LG_{35}	—	April 17, 2013	Nogales	M. Schwartz, P. R. Holvorcem	·	1.9 km	MPC · JPL
542877	2013 LJ_{36}	—	June 6, 2013	Mount Lemmon	Mount Lemmon Survey	·	3.3 km	MPC · JPL
542878	2013 MV_{2}	—	December 10, 2010	Mount Lemmon	Mount Lemmon Survey	EOS	1.7 km	MPC · JPL
542879	2013 MX_{2}	—	May 15, 2008	Mount Lemmon	Mount Lemmon Survey	·	2.6 km	MPC · JPL
542880	2013 MP_{4}	—	February 24, 2012	Mount Lemmon	Mount Lemmon Survey	EUN	1.3 km	MPC · JPL
542881	2013 MU_{4}	—	March 3, 2005	Kitt Peak	Spacewatch	·	1.2 km	MPC · JPL
542882	2013 MK_{5}	—	September 30, 2005	Catalina	CSS	·	1.7 km	MPC · JPL
542883	2013 MP_{5}	—	October 11, 2010	Mount Lemmon	Mount Lemmon Survey	·	710 m	MPC · JPL
542884	2013 MG_{6}	—	June 23, 2000	Kitt Peak	Spacewatch	·	2.2 km	MPC · JPL
542885	2013 MM_{6}	—	June 18, 2013	Haleakala	Pan-STARRS 1	·	720 m	MPC · JPL
542886	2013 MP_{7}	—	June 12, 2013	Haleakala	Pan-STARRS 1	·	1.8 km	MPC · JPL
542887	2013 MW_{10}	—	August 29, 2005	Palomar	NEAT	·	1.6 km	MPC · JPL
542888 Confino	2013 MH_{11}	Confino	June 10, 2013	Oukaïmeden	M. Ory	·	1.3 km	MPC · JPL
542889	2013 MY_{11}	—	June 30, 2013	Haleakala	Pan-STARRS 1	centaur	109 km	MPC · JPL
542890	2013 NC_{1}	—	July 1, 2013	Haleakala	Pan-STARRS 1	H	510 m	MPC · JPL
542891	2013 NH_{1}	—	March 13, 2007	Mount Lemmon	Mount Lemmon Survey	·	2.3 km	MPC · JPL
542892	2013 NK_{2}	—	December 10, 2010	Mount Lemmon	Mount Lemmon Survey	·	2.0 km	MPC · JPL
542893	2013 NM_{3}	—	January 20, 2012	Haleakala	Pan-STARRS 1	·	2.0 km	MPC · JPL
542894	2013 NT_{4}	—	September 16, 2009	Mount Lemmon	Mount Lemmon Survey	·	1.6 km	MPC · JPL
542895	2013 NJ_{8}	—	December 24, 2006	Mount Lemmon	Mount Lemmon Survey	H	520 m	MPC · JPL
542896	2013 NQ_{9}	—	September 3, 2008	Kitt Peak	Spacewatch	HYG	2.1 km	MPC · JPL
542897	2013 NM_{11}	—	April 13, 2010	Catalina	CSS	H	660 m	MPC · JPL
542898	2013 NA_{14}	—	April 4, 2003	Kitt Peak	Spacewatch	·	2.9 km	MPC · JPL
542899	2013 NF_{14}	—	July 13, 2013	Elena Remote	Oreshko, A.	·	1.6 km	MPC · JPL
542900	2013 NV_{17}	—	April 1, 2012	Haleakala	Pan-STARRS 1	·	1.7 km	MPC · JPL

== 542901–543000 ==
back to top

Designation			Discovery			Properties		Ref
Permanent	Provisional	Named after	Date	Site	Discoverer(s)	Category	Diam.	Ref
542901	2013 NL_{18}	—	July 14, 2013	Haleakala	Pan-STARRS 1	·	2.1 km	MPC · JPL
542902	2013 NF_{25}	—	October 20, 1995	Kitt Peak	Spacewatch	AGN	1.3 km	MPC · JPL
542903	2013 NB_{26}	—	October 10, 2004	Kitt Peak	Spacewatch	AGN	1 km	MPC · JPL
542904	2013 NQ_{26}	—	July 14, 2013	Haleakala	Pan-STARRS 1	EOS	1.3 km	MPC · JPL
542905	2013 NH_{32}	—	August 27, 2009	Kitt Peak	Spacewatch	·	1.0 km	MPC · JPL
542906	2013 OJ	—	June 28, 2005	Palomar	NEAT	H	570 m	MPC · JPL
542907	2013 OM_{3}	—	March 19, 2007	Mount Lemmon	Mount Lemmon Survey	H	550 m	MPC · JPL
542908	2013 OJ_{7}	—	December 9, 2010	Mount Lemmon	Mount Lemmon Survey	MAR	1.5 km	MPC · JPL
542909	2013 OL_{7}	—	July 19, 2002	Palomar	NEAT	·	2.8 km	MPC · JPL
542910	2013 OW_{9}	—	July 28, 2013	Črni Vrh	Mikuž, B.	·	2.7 km	MPC · JPL
542911	2013 OR_{10}	—	June 15, 2013	Mount Lemmon	Mount Lemmon Survey	·	3.3 km	MPC · JPL
542912	2013 OU_{12}	—	July 16, 2013	Haleakala	Pan-STARRS 1	LIX	3.3 km	MPC · JPL
542913	2013 PK	—	August 1, 2013	Palomar	Palomar Transient Factory	(8737)	4.0 km	MPC · JPL
542914	2013 PY	—	August 2, 2013	Haleakala	Pan-STARRS 1	·	2.6 km	MPC · JPL
542915	2013 PY_{3}	—	August 2, 2013	Črni Vrh	Vales, J.	·	3.1 km	MPC · JPL
542916	2013 PP_{4}	—	November 21, 2003	Kitt Peak	Deep Ecliptic Survey	·	4.2 km	MPC · JPL
542917	2013 PO_{5}	—	August 2, 2013	Haleakala	Pan-STARRS 1	·	1.9 km	MPC · JPL
542918	2013 PJ_{11}	—	May 14, 2012	Haleakala	Pan-STARRS 1	·	2.9 km	MPC · JPL
542919	2013 PS_{11}	—	November 19, 2009	Kitt Peak	Spacewatch	·	3.8 km	MPC · JPL
542920	2013 PX_{11}	—	August 5, 2013	Elena Remote	Oreshko, A.	·	2.5 km	MPC · JPL
542921	2013 PE_{12}	—	October 3, 2002	Palomar	NEAT	·	2.5 km	MPC · JPL
542922	2013 PL_{14}	—	August 7, 2013	Elena Remote	Oreshko, A.	·	3.5 km	MPC · JPL
542923	2013 PG_{18}	—	September 27, 2003	Kitt Peak	Spacewatch	·	1.5 km	MPC · JPL
542924	2013 PQ_{19}	—	January 4, 2006	Mount Lemmon	Mount Lemmon Survey	·	1.8 km	MPC · JPL
542925	2013 PS_{27}	—	October 5, 2008	La Sagra	OAM	·	2.1 km	MPC · JPL
542926 Manteca	2013 PP_{31}	Manteca	August 4, 2007	Pla D'Arguines	R. Ferrando, Ferrando, M.	·	3.0 km	MPC · JPL
542927	2013 PB_{34}	—	September 19, 2003	Palomar	NEAT	·	2.5 km	MPC · JPL
542928	2013 PY_{42}	—	November 20, 2008	Kitt Peak	Spacewatch	·	2.8 km	MPC · JPL
542929	2013 PM_{44}	—	July 15, 2013	Haleakala	Pan-STARRS 1	·	2.7 km	MPC · JPL
542930	2013 PN_{44}	—	July 13, 2013	Mount Lemmon	Mount Lemmon Survey	·	1.4 km	MPC · JPL
542931	2013 PQ_{47}	—	August 26, 2005	Palomar	NEAT	H	510 m	MPC · JPL
542932	2013 PR_{48}	—	December 6, 2005	Kitt Peak	Spacewatch	·	1.9 km	MPC · JPL
542933	2013 PZ_{51}	—	August 13, 2013	Kitt Peak	Spacewatch	·	2.3 km	MPC · JPL
542934	2013 PU_{52}	—	March 8, 2006	Kitt Peak	Spacewatch	T_{j} (2.98)	4.3 km	MPC · JPL
542935	2013 PD_{57}	—	November 9, 2009	Mount Lemmon	Mount Lemmon Survey	·	2.0 km	MPC · JPL
542936	2013 PM_{57}	—	July 16, 2013	Haleakala	Pan-STARRS 1	EOS	1.7 km	MPC · JPL
542937	2013 PM_{60}	—	June 20, 2013	Haleakala	Pan-STARRS 1	·	2.8 km	MPC · JPL
542938	2013 PW_{62}	—	September 18, 2009	Kitt Peak	Spacewatch	·	1.4 km	MPC · JPL
542939	2013 PE_{64}	—	July 28, 2013	Kitt Peak	Spacewatch	·	1.8 km	MPC · JPL
542940	2013 PJ_{64}	—	July 16, 2013	Haleakala	Pan-STARRS 1	·	2.6 km	MPC · JPL
542941	2013 PN_{66}	—	February 21, 2007	Catalina	CSS	H	500 m	MPC · JPL
542942	2013 PE_{68}	—	December 20, 2004	Mount Lemmon	Mount Lemmon Survey	·	4.6 km	MPC · JPL
542943	2013 PX_{68}	—	August 12, 2013	Haleakala	Pan-STARRS 1	·	860 m	MPC · JPL
542944	2013 PZ_{69}	—	July 16, 2013	Haleakala	Pan-STARRS 1	·	2.3 km	MPC · JPL
542945	2013 PZ_{75}	—	August 15, 2013	Haleakala	Pan-STARRS 1	·	1.6 km	MPC · JPL
542946	2013 PB_{77}	—	May 19, 2012	Mount Lemmon	Mount Lemmon Survey	·	2.5 km	MPC · JPL
542947	2013 PH_{77}	—	October 31, 2008	Mount Lemmon	Mount Lemmon Survey	·	1.9 km	MPC · JPL
542948	2013 PU_{77}	—	August 15, 2013	Haleakala	Pan-STARRS 1	EOS	1.3 km	MPC · JPL
542949	2013 PV_{77}	—	October 10, 2008	Mount Lemmon	Mount Lemmon Survey	EMA	2.1 km	MPC · JPL
542950	2013 PE_{78}	—	August 8, 2013	Kitt Peak	Spacewatch	KOR	1.1 km	MPC · JPL
542951	2013 PO_{80}	—	December 11, 2009	Mount Lemmon	Mount Lemmon Survey	KOR	1.3 km	MPC · JPL
542952	2013 PT_{82}	—	October 24, 2008	Kitt Peak	Spacewatch	·	1.8 km	MPC · JPL
542953	2013 PG_{83}	—	March 13, 2011	Kitt Peak	Spacewatch	·	1.8 km	MPC · JPL
542954	2013 QX_{2}	—	March 25, 2011	Haleakala	Pan-STARRS 1	·	1.7 km	MPC · JPL
542955	2013 QZ_{3}	—	August 26, 2003	Cerro Tololo	Deep Ecliptic Survey	KOR	1.3 km	MPC · JPL
542956	2013 QD_{5}	—	August 12, 2013	Kitt Peak	Spacewatch	EOS	1.9 km	MPC · JPL
542957	2013 QX_{7}	—	September 25, 2003	Palomar	NEAT	EOS	2.3 km	MPC · JPL
542958	2013 QQ_{10}	—	August 18, 2013	Haleakala	Pan-STARRS 1	H	390 m	MPC · JPL
542959	2013 QS_{10}	—	August 26, 2013	Haleakala	Pan-STARRS 1	H	430 m	MPC · JPL
542960	2013 QK_{11}	—	December 30, 2011	Catalina	CSS	H	470 m	MPC · JPL
542961	2013 QW_{13}	—	August 27, 2013	Haleakala	Pan-STARRS 1	·	1.3 km	MPC · JPL
542962	2013 QR_{14}	—	August 26, 2013	Haleakala	Pan-STARRS 1	·	3.7 km	MPC · JPL
542963	2013 QO_{15}	—	August 28, 2013	Haleakala	Pan-STARRS 1	·	2.5 km	MPC · JPL
542964	2013 QJ_{16}	—	November 30, 2005	Kitt Peak	Spacewatch	·	1.7 km	MPC · JPL
542965	2013 QC_{21}	—	September 19, 1998	Apache Point	SDSS	·	2.0 km	MPC · JPL
542966	2013 QB_{22}	—	December 10, 2009	Mount Lemmon	Mount Lemmon Survey	·	1.8 km	MPC · JPL
542967	2013 QP_{22}	—	October 19, 1995	Kitt Peak	Spacewatch	HOF	2.5 km	MPC · JPL
542968	2013 QY_{22}	—	August 24, 2002	Palomar	NEAT	·	4.7 km	MPC · JPL
542969	2013 QB_{24}	—	August 26, 2013	Haleakala	Pan-STARRS 1	·	1.7 km	MPC · JPL
542970	2013 QO_{24}	—	August 10, 2013	Kitt Peak	Spacewatch	KOR	1.4 km	MPC · JPL
542971	2013 QV_{24}	—	October 2, 2002	Haleakala	NEAT	·	3.7 km	MPC · JPL
542972	2013 QV_{28}	—	August 12, 2013	Kitt Peak	Spacewatch	·	1.8 km	MPC · JPL
542973	2013 QK_{30}	—	September 29, 2008	Catalina	CSS	·	2.4 km	MPC · JPL
542974	2013 QZ_{32}	—	July 30, 2013	Palomar	Palomar Transient Factory	H	530 m	MPC · JPL
542975	2013 QO_{35}	—	June 22, 2007	Mount Lemmon	Mount Lemmon Survey	·	2.8 km	MPC · JPL
542976	2013 QU_{36}	—	October 10, 2008	Mount Lemmon	Mount Lemmon Survey	·	3.2 km	MPC · JPL
542977	2013 QK_{40}	—	August 17, 2013	Haleakala	Pan-STARRS 1	EOS	1.8 km	MPC · JPL
542978	2013 QL_{41}	—	October 25, 2009	Kitt Peak	Spacewatch	AGN	1.2 km	MPC · JPL
542979	2013 QX_{42}	—	September 11, 2002	Palomar	NEAT	·	2.6 km	MPC · JPL
542980	2013 QB_{46}	—	January 15, 2010	Mount Lemmon	Mount Lemmon Survey	·	3.9 km	MPC · JPL
542981	2013 QZ_{47}	—	August 29, 2002	Kitt Peak	Spacewatch	·	1.8 km	MPC · JPL
542982	2013 QF_{48}	—	August 31, 2013	Črni Vrh	Skvarč, J.	·	2.7 km	MPC · JPL
542983	2013 QQ_{50}	—	September 6, 2008	Mount Lemmon	Mount Lemmon Survey	·	1.5 km	MPC · JPL
542984	2013 QV_{50}	—	April 29, 2012	Kitt Peak	Spacewatch	·	1.1 km	MPC · JPL
542985	2013 QG_{51}	—	August 15, 2013	Haleakala	Pan-STARRS 1	MRX	1.0 km	MPC · JPL
542986	2013 QO_{56}	—	October 21, 2009	Mount Lemmon	Mount Lemmon Survey	·	1.9 km	MPC · JPL
542987	2013 QP_{57}	—	August 14, 2013	Haleakala	Pan-STARRS 1	·	3.1 km	MPC · JPL
542988	2013 QY_{58}	—	July 30, 2013	Kitt Peak	Spacewatch	·	2.0 km	MPC · JPL
542989	2013 QK_{59}	—	October 20, 2008	Kitt Peak	Spacewatch	THM	2.3 km	MPC · JPL
542990	2013 QH_{63}	—	June 20, 2013	Haleakala	Pan-STARRS 1	EOS	1.8 km	MPC · JPL
542991	2013 QB_{65}	—	August 29, 2002	Palomar	NEAT	·	3.2 km	MPC · JPL
542992	2013 QT_{66}	—	February 13, 2012	Haleakala	Pan-STARRS 1	H	450 m	MPC · JPL
542993	2013 QV_{66}	—	May 1, 2012	Kitt Peak	Spacewatch	BRA	1.7 km	MPC · JPL
542994	2013 QW_{66}	—	September 5, 2008	Kitt Peak	Spacewatch	·	2.1 km	MPC · JPL
542995	2013 QU_{69}	—	October 10, 2002	Palomar	NEAT	·	3.7 km	MPC · JPL
542996	2013 QF_{70}	—	August 28, 2013	Palomar	Palomar Transient Factory	TIN	1.7 km	MPC · JPL
542997	2013 QX_{73}	—	June 13, 2013	Mount Lemmon	Mount Lemmon Survey	·	2.3 km	MPC · JPL
542998	2013 QY_{74}	—	September 11, 2002	Palomar	NEAT	·	4.1 km	MPC · JPL
542999	2013 QN_{80}	—	August 15, 2013	Haleakala	Pan-STARRS 1	·	1.3 km	MPC · JPL
543000	2013 QY_{82}	—	August 26, 2013	Haleakala	Pan-STARRS 1	·	1.9 km	MPC · JPL

back to top

== Meaning of names ==
As minor planet discoveries are confirmed, they are given a permanent number by the IAU's Minor Planet Center (MPC), and the discoverers can then submit names for them, following the IAU's naming conventions. The list below concerns those minor planets in the specified number-range that have received names, and explains the meanings of those names.

Official naming citations of newly named small Solar System bodies are approved and published in a bulletin by IAU's Working Group for Small Bodies Nomenclature (WGSBN). Before May 2021, citations were published in MPC's Minor Planet Circulars for many decades. Recent citations can also be found on the JPL Small-Body Database (SBDB). Until his death in 2016, German astronomer Lutz D. Schmadel compiled these citations into the Dictionary of Minor Planet Names (DMP) and regularly updated the collection.

Based on Paul Herget's The Names of the Minor Planets, Schmadel also researched the unclear origin of numerous asteroids, most of which had been named prior to World War II. This article incorporates text from this source, which is in the public domain: SBDB New namings may only be added to this list below after official publication as the preannouncement of names is condemned. The WGSBN publishes a comprehensive guideline for the naming rules of non-cometary small Solar System bodies.

Named minor planet	Provisional	This minor planet was named for...	Ref · Catalog
542026 Kaszásattila	2012 JL_{19}	Attila Kaszás (1960–2007) was a Slovak-born Hungarian actor and singer.	IAU · 542026
542084 Olegverkhodanov	2012 NH	Oleg Verkhodanov (1965–2020), Russian cosmologist and science communicator.	IAU · 542084
542246 Kulcsár	2013 AL_{132}	Győző Kulcsár (1940–2018) was a Hungarian fencer and fencing coach who won several gold medals in the men's team épée events at the 1964, 1968, and 1972 Olympic Games.	IAU · 542246
542461 Slovinský	2013 CA_{196}	Tomáš Slovinský (born 1994) is a Slovak astrophotographer and popularizer of astronomy using a portable planetarium.	IAU · 542461
542509 Lyatoshynsky	2013 EU_{18}	Borys Mykolayovych Lyatoshynsky (1895–1968) was a Ukrainian composer, conductor, and teacher. A leading member of the new generation of twentieth-century Ukrainian composers, he wrote five symphonies, two operas, and a number of symphonic poems and orchestral works.	IAU · 542509
542561 Ritajochen	2013 EB_{105}	Rita Jahn (1932–2015) and Jochen Jahn (1932–2017), parents of German amateur astronomer Jost Jahn, who discovered this minor planet.	IAU · 542561
542568 Erichess	2013 ET_{111}	Eric Hess, Canadian Astrophysics Intern and telescope operator at the Rothney Astrophysical Observatory of the University of Calgary, Alberta.	IAU · 542568
542600 Lindahall	2013 FM_{19}	The Linda Hall Library of Science, Engineering and Technology in Kansas City, Missouri, is one of the largest science libraries in the world.	IAU · 542600
542762 Davidlee	2013 HU_{77}	David Lee, Canadian astrophotographer and public speaker at the interpretive center of the Dominion Astrophysical Observatory. He is a past president of the Royal Astronomical Society of Canada.	IAU · 542762
542857 Elmi	2013 LP_{14}	Omar Elmi, Canadian student of astrophysics at McMaster University.	IAU · 542857
542888 Confino	2013 MH_{11}	Bastien Confino (born 1978), a French-Swiss amateur astronomer and a radio reporter for Radio Télévision Suisse.	JPL · 542888
542926 Manteca	2013 PP_{31}	José Manteca (born 1959), a Spanish astronomer and discoverer of minor planets, who is the director of the Begues Observatory in Barcelona.	IAU · 542926
