= List of minor planets: 855001–856000 =

The following is a partial list of minor planets, running from minor-planet number 855001 through 856000, inclusive. The primary data for this and other partial lists is based on JPL's "Small-Body Orbital Elements" and data available from the Minor Planet Center. Critical list information is also provided by the MPC, unless otherwise specified from Lowell Observatory. A detailed description of the table's columns and additional sources are given on the main page including a complete list of every page in this series, and a statistical break-up on the dynamical classification of minor planets.

Also see the summary list of all named bodies in numerical and alphabetical order, and the corresponding naming citations for the number range of this particular list. New namings may only be added to this list after official publication, as the preannouncement of names is condemned by the Working Group for Small Bodies Nomenclature of the International Astronomical Union.

Near-Earth obj.	MBA (inner)	MBA (outer)	Centaur
Mars-crosser	MBA (middle)	Jupiter trojan	Trans-Neptunian obj.
Unclassified

== 855001–855100 ==
Designation			Discovery			Properties		Ref
Permanent	Provisional	Named after	Date	Site	Discoverer(s)	Category	Diam.	Ref
855001	2010 VC_{141}	—	November 6, 2010	Mount Lemmon	Mount Lemmon Survey	·	790 m	MPC · JPL
855002	2010 VV_{141}	—	November 6, 2010	Mount Lemmon	Mount Lemmon Survey	·	1.3 km	MPC · JPL
855003	2010 VV_{142}	—	November 6, 2010	Mount Lemmon	Mount Lemmon Survey	·	750 m	MPC · JPL
855004	2010 VG_{146}	—	August 21, 2006	Kitt Peak	Spacewatch	·	770 m	MPC · JPL
855005	2010 VP_{149}	—	November 6, 2010	Mount Lemmon	Mount Lemmon Survey	·	1.2 km	MPC · JPL
855006	2010 VN_{160}	—	September 17, 2010	Mount Lemmon	Mount Lemmon Survey	·	2.2 km	MPC · JPL
855007	2010 VU_{160}	—	October 28, 2010	Mount Lemmon	Mount Lemmon Survey	·	470 m	MPC · JPL
855008	2010 VW_{166}	—	November 10, 2010	Mount Lemmon	Mount Lemmon Survey	·	410 m	MPC · JPL
855009	2010 VD_{180}	—	November 11, 2010	Mount Lemmon	Mount Lemmon Survey	·	2.0 km	MPC · JPL
855010	2010 VR_{181}	—	November 11, 2010	Mount Lemmon	Mount Lemmon Survey	(5)	1.0 km	MPC · JPL
855011	2010 VT_{184}	—	October 3, 2006	Mount Lemmon	Mount Lemmon Survey	·	970 m	MPC · JPL
855012	2010 VS_{186}	—	November 13, 2010	Mount Lemmon	Mount Lemmon Survey	·	1.3 km	MPC · JPL
855013	2010 VP_{190}	—	November 13, 2010	Kitt Peak	Spacewatch	MAS	480 m	MPC · JPL
855014	2010 VB_{198}	—	November 15, 2010	Catalina	CSS	PHO	1.2 km	MPC · JPL
855015	2010 VF_{205}	—	December 3, 2010	Mount Lemmon	Mount Lemmon Survey	·	2.1 km	MPC · JPL
855016	2010 VT_{207}	—	October 17, 2010	Mount Lemmon	Mount Lemmon Survey	TIR	2.2 km	MPC · JPL
855017	2010 VP_{210}	—	January 5, 2011	Mount Lemmon	Mount Lemmon Survey	·	2.1 km	MPC · JPL
855018	2010 VN_{212}	—	October 11, 2010	Catalina	CSS	·	1.3 km	MPC · JPL
855019	2010 VA_{214}	—	September 16, 2010	Mount Lemmon	Mount Lemmon Survey	·	660 m	MPC · JPL
855020	2010 VG_{215}	—	October 17, 2010	Mount Lemmon	Mount Lemmon Survey	·	680 m	MPC · JPL
855021	2010 VP_{219}	—	March 28, 2012	Mount Lemmon	Mount Lemmon Survey	·	2.1 km	MPC · JPL
855022	2010 VH_{225}	—	November 8, 2010	Kitt Peak	Spacewatch	H	370 m	MPC · JPL
855023	2010 VQ_{226}	—	November 1, 2010	Mount Lemmon	Mount Lemmon Survey	THM	1.5 km	MPC · JPL
855024	2010 VH_{228}	—	November 13, 2010	Mount Lemmon	Mount Lemmon Survey	NYS	740 m	MPC · JPL
855025	2010 VJ_{229}	—	November 15, 2010	Mount Lemmon	Mount Lemmon Survey	·	530 m	MPC · JPL
855026	2010 VP_{231}	—	November 9, 2010	Mount Lemmon	Mount Lemmon Survey	H	460 m	MPC · JPL
855027	2010 VT_{231}	—	July 4, 2013	Haleakala	Pan-STARRS 1	V	480 m	MPC · JPL
855028	2010 VW_{231}	—	November 8, 2010	Mount Lemmon	Mount Lemmon Survey	PHO	640 m	MPC · JPL
855029	2010 VK_{232}	—	January 21, 2012	Kitt Peak	Spacewatch	EOS	1.4 km	MPC · JPL
855030	2010 VK_{233}	—	November 3, 2010	Mount Lemmon	Mount Lemmon Survey	·	690 m	MPC · JPL
855031	2010 VP_{233}	—	November 12, 2010	Mount Lemmon	Mount Lemmon Survey	T_{j} (2.98) · 3:2 · (6124)	3.5 km	MPC · JPL
855032	2010 VB_{234}	—	November 3, 2010	Mount Lemmon	Mount Lemmon Survey	·	520 m	MPC · JPL
855033	2010 VL_{234}	—	November 12, 2010	Mount Lemmon	Mount Lemmon Survey	V	400 m	MPC · JPL
855034	2010 VN_{234}	—	March 27, 2016	Mount Lemmon	Mount Lemmon Survey	PHO	730 m	MPC · JPL
855035	2010 VS_{234}	—	November 8, 2010	Mount Lemmon	Mount Lemmon Survey	V	380 m	MPC · JPL
855036	2010 VZ_{235}	—	March 16, 2012	Mount Lemmon	Mount Lemmon Survey	EUP	2.5 km	MPC · JPL
855037	2010 VC_{239}	—	November 8, 2010	Mount Lemmon	Mount Lemmon Survey	·	1.3 km	MPC · JPL
855038	2010 VA_{241}	—	November 22, 2014	Mount Lemmon	Mount Lemmon Survey	·	800 m	MPC · JPL
855039	2010 VS_{241}	—	November 19, 2014	Mount Lemmon	Mount Lemmon Survey	·	840 m	MPC · JPL
855040	2010 VN_{242}	—	November 3, 2010	Mount Lemmon	Mount Lemmon Survey	·	730 m	MPC · JPL
855041	2010 VL_{244}	—	November 3, 2010	Kitt Peak	Spacewatch	·	1.4 km	MPC · JPL
855042	2010 VW_{244}	—	November 14, 2010	Mount Lemmon	Mount Lemmon Survey	·	1.3 km	MPC · JPL
855043	2010 VB_{245}	—	February 12, 2018	Haleakala	Pan-STARRS 1	·	1.7 km	MPC · JPL
855044	2010 VH_{246}	—	July 1, 2014	Haleakala	Pan-STARRS 1	·	840 m	MPC · JPL
855045	2010 VZ_{247}	—	November 10, 2010	Catalina	CSS	·	420 m	MPC · JPL
855046	2010 VX_{249}	—	November 7, 2010	Mount Lemmon	Mount Lemmon Survey	PHO	780 m	MPC · JPL
855047	2010 VA_{250}	—	November 6, 2010	Kitt Peak	Spacewatch	MAS	510 m	MPC · JPL
855048	2010 VW_{252}	—	November 11, 2010	Mount Lemmon	Mount Lemmon Survey	PHO	700 m	MPC · JPL
855049	2010 VC_{253}	—	November 11, 2010	Mount Lemmon	Mount Lemmon Survey	·	1.5 km	MPC · JPL
855050	2010 VE_{255}	—	November 14, 2010	Mount Lemmon	Mount Lemmon Survey	·	2.2 km	MPC · JPL
855051	2010 VA_{257}	—	November 13, 2010	Mount Lemmon	Mount Lemmon Survey	EOS	1.5 km	MPC · JPL
855052	2010 VU_{257}	—	November 4, 2010	Mount Lemmon	Mount Lemmon Survey	·	1.5 km	MPC · JPL
855053	2010 VD_{258}	—	November 13, 2010	Mount Lemmon	Mount Lemmon Survey	·	1.5 km	MPC · JPL
855054	2010 VE_{258}	—	November 13, 2010	Mount Lemmon	Mount Lemmon Survey	·	530 m	MPC · JPL
855055	2010 VS_{258}	—	November 2, 2010	Mount Lemmon	Mount Lemmon Survey	·	1.9 km	MPC · JPL
855056	2010 VY_{258}	—	November 15, 2010	Kitt Peak	Spacewatch	·	1.2 km	MPC · JPL
855057	2010 VF_{259}	—	November 11, 2010	Kitt Peak	Spacewatch	EOS	1.2 km	MPC · JPL
855058	2010 VN_{259}	—	November 8, 2010	Mount Lemmon	Mount Lemmon Survey	·	1.4 km	MPC · JPL
855059	2010 VW_{259}	—	November 2, 2010	Mount Lemmon	Mount Lemmon Survey	EOS	1.3 km	MPC · JPL
855060	2010 VJ_{260}	—	November 4, 2010	Mount Lemmon	Mount Lemmon Survey	·	1.8 km	MPC · JPL
855061	2010 VY_{261}	—	November 14, 2010	Mount Lemmon	Mount Lemmon Survey	L4	5.7 km	MPC · JPL
855062	2010 VS_{262}	—	November 4, 2010	Mount Lemmon	Mount Lemmon Survey	·	1.4 km	MPC · JPL
855063	2010 VX_{263}	—	November 3, 2010	Mount Lemmon	Mount Lemmon Survey	·	1.5 km	MPC · JPL
855064	2010 VX_{266}	—	November 13, 2010	Mount Lemmon	Mount Lemmon Survey	·	970 m	MPC · JPL
855065	2010 VC_{267}	—	November 1, 2010	Mount Lemmon	Mount Lemmon Survey	NYS	830 m	MPC · JPL
855066	2010 VX_{269}	—	September 11, 2010	Mount Lemmon	Mount Lemmon Survey	·	940 m	MPC · JPL
855067	2010 VG_{270}	—	November 3, 2010	Kitt Peak	Spacewatch	·	660 m	MPC · JPL
855068	2010 VY_{271}	—	November 12, 2010	Mount Lemmon	Mount Lemmon Survey	·	2.2 km	MPC · JPL
855069	2010 VS_{273}	—	November 11, 2010	Mount Lemmon	Mount Lemmon Survey	L4	6.3 km	MPC · JPL
855070	2010 VY_{274}	—	November 2, 2010	Mount Lemmon	Mount Lemmon Survey	TIR	2.0 km	MPC · JPL
855071	2010 VD_{275}	—	November 7, 2010	Mount Lemmon	Mount Lemmon Survey	·	2.6 km	MPC · JPL
855072	2010 VP_{277}	—	November 6, 2010	Mount Lemmon	Mount Lemmon Survey	EOS	1.2 km	MPC · JPL
855073	2010 VU_{277}	—	November 8, 2010	Mount Lemmon	Mount Lemmon Survey	PHO	660 m	MPC · JPL
855074	2010 VZ_{277}	—	December 1, 2005	Kitt Peak	Spacewatch	·	1.2 km	MPC · JPL
855075	2010 VZ_{278}	—	November 1, 2010	Mount Lemmon	Mount Lemmon Survey	L4	5.6 km	MPC · JPL
855076	2010 VC_{282}	—	November 11, 2010	Mount Lemmon	Mount Lemmon Survey	·	1.7 km	MPC · JPL
855077	2010 WQ_{7}	—	November 27, 2010	Catalina	CSS	AMO	760 m	MPC · JPL
855078	2010 WQ_{12}	—	September 11, 2010	Mount Lemmon	Mount Lemmon Survey	·	890 m	MPC · JPL
855079	2010 WH_{14}	—	September 5, 2010	Mount Lemmon	Mount Lemmon Survey	·	1.1 km	MPC · JPL
855080	2010 WS_{17}	—	November 27, 2010	Mount Lemmon	Mount Lemmon Survey	3:2	4.2 km	MPC · JPL
855081	2010 WV_{17}	—	November 27, 2010	Mount Lemmon	Mount Lemmon Survey	·	1.2 km	MPC · JPL
855082	2010 WM_{20}	—	November 2, 2010	Kitt Peak	Spacewatch	·	1.3 km	MPC · JPL
855083	2010 WC_{21}	—	November 13, 2010	Kitt Peak	Spacewatch	·	1.4 km	MPC · JPL
855084	2010 WT_{21}	—	October 27, 2005	Mount Lemmon	Mount Lemmon Survey	KOR	1.0 km	MPC · JPL
855085	2010 WB_{25}	—	November 27, 2010	Mount Lemmon	Mount Lemmon Survey	KOR	840 m	MPC · JPL
855086	2010 WL_{27}	—	November 27, 2010	Mount Lemmon	Mount Lemmon Survey	H	410 m	MPC · JPL
855087	2010 WC_{32}	—	September 19, 1998	Kitt Peak	Spacewatch	·	910 m	MPC · JPL
855088	2010 WA_{36}	—	August 8, 2005	Cerro Tololo	Deep Ecliptic Survey	(5)	820 m	MPC · JPL
855089	2010 WL_{36}	—	November 27, 2010	Mount Lemmon	Mount Lemmon Survey	·	440 m	MPC · JPL
855090	2010 WM_{37}	—	September 19, 2006	Kitt Peak	Spacewatch	·	730 m	MPC · JPL
855091	2010 WR_{38}	—	August 28, 2006	Kitt Peak	Spacewatch	NYS	700 m	MPC · JPL
855092	2010 WJ_{42}	—	March 26, 2008	Mount Lemmon	Mount Lemmon Survey	·	850 m	MPC · JPL
855093	2010 WP_{44}	—	November 7, 2010	Kitt Peak	Spacewatch	·	1.0 km	MPC · JPL
855094	2010 WA_{49}	—	November 27, 2010	Mount Lemmon	Mount Lemmon Survey	·	2.0 km	MPC · JPL
855095	2010 WE_{50}	—	November 2, 2010	Kitt Peak	Spacewatch	·	880 m	MPC · JPL
855096	2010 WB_{51}	—	November 28, 2010	Mount Lemmon	Mount Lemmon Survey	(5)	890 m	MPC · JPL
855097	2010 WZ_{51}	—	September 25, 2006	Mount Lemmon	Mount Lemmon Survey	·	820 m	MPC · JPL
855098	2010 WH_{52}	—	November 28, 2010	Mount Lemmon	Mount Lemmon Survey	MAS	470 m	MPC · JPL
855099	2010 WX_{54}	—	October 2, 2006	Mount Lemmon	Mount Lemmon Survey	·	950 m	MPC · JPL
855100	2010 WG_{57}	—	November 30, 2010	Mount Lemmon	Mount Lemmon Survey	·	1.2 km	MPC · JPL

== 855101–855200 ==
back to top

Designation			Discovery			Properties		Ref
Permanent	Provisional	Named after	Date	Site	Discoverer(s)	Category	Diam.	Ref
855101	2010 WV_{58}	—	November 10, 2010	Mount Lemmon	Mount Lemmon Survey	·	610 m	MPC · JPL
855102	2010 WZ_{59}	—	November 27, 2010	Mount Lemmon	Mount Lemmon Survey	·	1.4 km	MPC · JPL
855103	2010 WZ_{66}	—	November 30, 2010	Mount Lemmon	Mount Lemmon Survey	·	1.6 km	MPC · JPL
855104	2010 WA_{76}	—	November 30, 2010	Mount Lemmon	Mount Lemmon Survey	·	810 m	MPC · JPL
855105	2010 WB_{77}	—	November 5, 1996	Kitt Peak	Spacewatch	·	1.2 km	MPC · JPL
855106	2010 WG_{77}	—	October 12, 2014	Kitt Peak	Spacewatch	·	1.1 km	MPC · JPL
855107	2010 WC_{79}	—	November 28, 2010	Mount Lemmon	Mount Lemmon Survey	EOS	1.3 km	MPC · JPL
855108	2010 WD_{79}	—	November 16, 2010	Mount Lemmon	Mount Lemmon Survey	EOS	1.3 km	MPC · JPL
855109	2010 WX_{79}	—	November 27, 2010	Mount Lemmon	Mount Lemmon Survey	·	2.5 km	MPC · JPL
855110	2010 WB_{81}	—	November 3, 2010	Mount Lemmon	Mount Lemmon Survey	·	890 m	MPC · JPL
855111	2010 WC_{81}	—	November 27, 2010	Mount Lemmon	Mount Lemmon Survey	·	1.9 km	MPC · JPL
855112	2010 XU_{3}	—	October 29, 1999	Kitt Peak	Spacewatch	·	2.0 km	MPC · JPL
855113	2010 XV_{3}	—	September 5, 2010	Mount Lemmon	Mount Lemmon Survey	·	890 m	MPC · JPL
855114	2010 XN_{5}	—	November 16, 2010	Mount Lemmon	Mount Lemmon Survey	H	350 m	MPC · JPL
855115	2010 XW_{6}	—	December 2, 2010	Mount Lemmon	Mount Lemmon Survey	·	1.3 km	MPC · JPL
855116	2010 XL_{11}	—	October 2, 2006	Mount Lemmon	Mount Lemmon Survey	·	890 m	MPC · JPL
855117	2010 XS_{13}	—	November 1, 2010	Mount Lemmon	Mount Lemmon Survey	H	310 m	MPC · JPL
855118	2010 XH_{20}	—	December 5, 2010	Mount Lemmon	Mount Lemmon Survey	PHO	660 m	MPC · JPL
855119	2010 XP_{20}	—	October 13, 2010	Mount Lemmon	Mount Lemmon Survey	T_{j} (2.98) · 3:2	3.5 km	MPC · JPL
855120	2010 XB_{21}	—	December 2, 2010	Mount Lemmon	Mount Lemmon Survey	PHO	790 m	MPC · JPL
855121	2010 XJ_{22}	—	November 26, 2010	Mount Lemmon	Mount Lemmon Survey	·	2.0 km	MPC · JPL
855122	2010 XD_{27}	—	December 1, 2010	Mount Lemmon	Mount Lemmon Survey	·	970 m	MPC · JPL
855123	2010 XG_{31}	—	November 11, 2010	Mount Lemmon	Mount Lemmon Survey	·	1.5 km	MPC · JPL
855124	2010 XG_{32}	—	November 13, 2010	Kitt Peak	Spacewatch	·	520 m	MPC · JPL
855125	2010 XO_{33}	—	December 2, 2010	Mount Lemmon	Mount Lemmon Survey	BAR	850 m	MPC · JPL
855126	2010 XL_{37}	—	December 3, 2010	Kitt Peak	Spacewatch	PHO	750 m	MPC · JPL
855127	2010 XZ_{38}	—	December 3, 2010	Mount Lemmon	Mount Lemmon Survey	·	1.2 km	MPC · JPL
855128	2010 XY_{44}	—	November 3, 2010	Kitt Peak	Spacewatch	·	650 m	MPC · JPL
855129	2010 XF_{48}	—	December 6, 2010	Kitt Peak	Spacewatch	PHO	610 m	MPC · JPL
855130	2010 XE_{58}	—	October 17, 2010	Mount Lemmon	Mount Lemmon Survey	·	1.0 km	MPC · JPL
855131	2010 XJ_{61}	—	October 29, 1999	Kitt Peak	Spacewatch	·	670 m	MPC · JPL
855132	2010 XE_{71}	—	October 29, 2010	Mount Lemmon	Mount Lemmon Survey	·	930 m	MPC · JPL
855133	2010 XR_{80}	—	December 6, 2010	Mount Lemmon	Mount Lemmon Survey	·	2.0 km	MPC · JPL
855134	2010 XG_{82}	—	December 2, 2010	Mount Lemmon	Mount Lemmon Survey	·	1.2 km	MPC · JPL
855135	2010 XO_{87}	—	December 11, 2010	Mount Lemmon	Mount Lemmon Survey	·	820 m	MPC · JPL
855136	2010 XQ_{88}	—	November 3, 2010	Mount Lemmon	Mount Lemmon Survey	NYS	800 m	MPC · JPL
855137	2010 XO_{91}	—	April 3, 2016	Haleakala	Pan-STARRS 1	L4	6.8 km	MPC · JPL
855138	2010 XM_{93}	—	December 14, 2010	Mount Lemmon	Mount Lemmon Survey	EOS	1.3 km	MPC · JPL
855139	2010 XP_{93}	—	December 14, 2010	Mount Lemmon	Mount Lemmon Survey	·	2.0 km	MPC · JPL
855140	2010 XD_{98}	—	December 13, 2010	Mount Lemmon	Mount Lemmon Survey	·	740 m	MPC · JPL
855141	2010 XC_{99}	—	January 15, 2015	Haleakala	Pan-STARRS 1	PHO	690 m	MPC · JPL
855142	2010 XE_{99}	—	December 3, 2010	Mount Lemmon	Mount Lemmon Survey	·	1.8 km	MPC · JPL
855143	2010 XH_{99}	—	October 10, 2015	Haleakala	Pan-STARRS 1	·	1.5 km	MPC · JPL
855144	2010 XL_{99}	—	December 10, 2010	Mount Lemmon	Mount Lemmon Survey	H	390 m	MPC · JPL
855145	2010 XO_{99}	—	January 25, 2006	Kitt Peak	Spacewatch	·	2.0 km	MPC · JPL
855146	2010 XP_{99}	—	February 24, 2015	Haleakala	Pan-STARRS 1	PHO	900 m	MPC · JPL
855147	2010 XT_{99}	—	September 6, 2015	Kitt Peak	Spacewatch	·	1.9 km	MPC · JPL
855148	2010 XF_{100}	—	November 7, 2015	Mount Lemmon	Mount Lemmon Survey	·	1.8 km	MPC · JPL
855149	2010 XQ_{102}	—	July 28, 2014	Haleakala	Pan-STARRS 1	·	1.2 km	MPC · JPL
855150	2010 XY_{103}	—	December 3, 2010	Mount Lemmon	Mount Lemmon Survey	H	440 m	MPC · JPL
855151	2010 XA_{104}	—	December 20, 2014	Haleakala	Pan-STARRS 1	·	1.2 km	MPC · JPL
855152	2010 XN_{104}	—	December 9, 2010	Mount Lemmon	Mount Lemmon Survey	H	410 m	MPC · JPL
855153	2010 XQ_{104}	—	January 18, 2015	Mount Lemmon	Mount Lemmon Survey	V	470 m	MPC · JPL
855154	2010 XZ_{104}	—	May 22, 2017	Mount Lemmon	Mount Lemmon Survey	H	410 m	MPC · JPL
855155	2010 XT_{105}	—	September 4, 2013	Piszkéstető	K. Sárneczky	·	470 m	MPC · JPL
855156	2010 XV_{105}	—	January 2, 2017	Haleakala	Pan-STARRS 1	·	2.6 km	MPC · JPL
855157	2010 XR_{106}	—	December 3, 2010	Mount Lemmon	Mount Lemmon Survey	EOS	1.4 km	MPC · JPL
855158	2010 XE_{107}	—	August 31, 2014	Haleakala	Pan-STARRS 1	·	1.4 km	MPC · JPL
855159	2010 XH_{108}	—	January 26, 2017	Haleakala	Pan-STARRS 1	·	2.0 km	MPC · JPL
855160	2010 XN_{108}	—	February 23, 2012	Mount Lemmon	Mount Lemmon Survey	·	1.4 km	MPC · JPL
855161	2010 XY_{109}	—	December 3, 2010	Mount Lemmon	Mount Lemmon Survey	·	930 m	MPC · JPL
855162	2010 XZ_{111}	—	December 4, 2010	Piszkés-tető	K. Sárneczky, Z. Kuli	·	890 m	MPC · JPL
855163	2010 XJ_{113}	—	December 14, 2010	Mount Lemmon	Mount Lemmon Survey	·	540 m	MPC · JPL
855164	2010 XC_{114}	—	December 3, 2010	Mount Lemmon	Mount Lemmon Survey	·	1.2 km	MPC · JPL
855165	2010 XB_{115}	—	December 2, 2010	Mount Lemmon	Mount Lemmon Survey	·	500 m	MPC · JPL
855166	2010 XC_{115}	—	December 2, 2010	Mount Lemmon	Mount Lemmon Survey	·	460 m	MPC · JPL
855167	2010 XE_{115}	—	December 14, 2010	Mount Lemmon	Mount Lemmon Survey	·	510 m	MPC · JPL
855168	2010 XH_{116}	—	December 3, 2010	Mount Lemmon	Mount Lemmon Survey	L4	6.2 km	MPC · JPL
855169	2010 XG_{117}	—	December 3, 2010	Mount Lemmon	Mount Lemmon Survey	·	2.4 km	MPC · JPL
855170	2010 XV_{118}	—	December 13, 2010	Mount Lemmon	Mount Lemmon Survey	TIR	2.3 km	MPC · JPL
855171	2010 XN_{119}	—	December 15, 2010	Mount Lemmon	Mount Lemmon Survey	EUP	3.2 km	MPC · JPL
855172	2010 XW_{119}	—	December 2, 2010	Mount Lemmon	Mount Lemmon Survey	T_{j} (2.98) · 3:2 · (6124)	4.2 km	MPC · JPL
855173	2010 XX_{124}	—	December 9, 2010	Mount Lemmon	Mount Lemmon Survey	·	410 m	MPC · JPL
855174	2010 YK_{2}	—	December 30, 2010	Piszkés-tető	K. Sárneczky, Z. Kuli	·	1.2 km	MPC · JPL
855175	2010 YJ_{3}	—	November 15, 2010	Mount Lemmon	Mount Lemmon Survey	·	1.1 km	MPC · JPL
855176	2010 YY_{3}	—	December 30, 2010	Piszkés-tető	K. Sárneczky, Z. Kuli	·	1.7 km	MPC · JPL
855177	2010 YD_{5}	—	November 28, 2010	Mount Lemmon	Mount Lemmon Survey	TIR	2.3 km	MPC · JPL
855178	2010 YX_{6}	—	December 25, 2010	Mount Lemmon	Mount Lemmon Survey	·	2.2 km	MPC · JPL
855179	2010 YZ_{6}	—	December 25, 2010	Mount Lemmon	Mount Lemmon Survey	·	1.8 km	MPC · JPL
855180	2011 AW	—	November 15, 2010	Mount Lemmon	Mount Lemmon Survey	·	1.2 km	MPC · JPL
855181	2011 AW_{1}	—	October 22, 2006	Kitt Peak	Spacewatch	·	900 m	MPC · JPL
855182	2011 AX_{6}	—	January 2, 2011	Mount Lemmon	Mount Lemmon Survey	H	490 m	MPC · JPL
855183	2011 AT_{15}	—	November 19, 2000	Kitt Peak	Spacewatch	T_{j} (2.77)	3.3 km	MPC · JPL
855184	2011 AD_{17}	—	November 12, 2010	Kitt Peak	Spacewatch	·	830 m	MPC · JPL
855185	2011 AK_{19}	—	January 8, 2011	Kitt Peak	Spacewatch	·	620 m	MPC · JPL
855186	2011 AK_{20}	—	May 8, 2008	Mount Lemmon	Mount Lemmon Survey	·	760 m	MPC · JPL
855187	2011 AB_{21}	—	January 9, 2011	Mount Lemmon	Mount Lemmon Survey	·	1.9 km	MPC · JPL
855188	2011 AS_{21}	—	January 5, 2011	Catalina	CSS	·	2.1 km	MPC · JPL
855189	2011 AA_{38}	—	October 19, 2003	Kitt Peak	Spacewatch	·	400 m	MPC · JPL
855190	2011 AJ_{38}	—	January 8, 2011	Kitt Peak	Spacewatch	·	940 m	MPC · JPL
855191	2011 AX_{38}	—	January 10, 2011	Mount Lemmon	Mount Lemmon Survey	EOS	1.3 km	MPC · JPL
855192	2011 AE_{39}	—	January 10, 2011	Mount Lemmon	Mount Lemmon Survey	MAS	450 m	MPC · JPL
855193	2011 AR_{40}	—	January 10, 2011	Mount Lemmon	Mount Lemmon Survey	·	1.1 km	MPC · JPL
855194	2011 AS_{41}	—	January 10, 2011	Mount Lemmon	Mount Lemmon Survey	·	1.9 km	MPC · JPL
855195	2011 AP_{50}	—	January 13, 2011	Mount Lemmon	Mount Lemmon Survey	·	560 m	MPC · JPL
855196	2011 AR_{50}	—	January 13, 2011	Mount Lemmon	Mount Lemmon Survey	·	1.8 km	MPC · JPL
855197	2011 AO_{52}	—	January 14, 2011	Catalina	CSS	AMO +1km	800 m	MPC · JPL
855198	2011 AA_{53}	—	December 9, 2010	Mount Lemmon	Mount Lemmon Survey	·	2.0 km	MPC · JPL
855199	2011 AD_{54}	—	January 14, 2011	Mount Lemmon	Mount Lemmon Survey	·	2.0 km	MPC · JPL
855200	2011 AP_{54}	—	January 14, 2011	Mount Lemmon	Mount Lemmon Survey	·	1.0 km	MPC · JPL

== 855201–855300 ==
back to top

Designation			Discovery			Properties		Ref
Permanent	Provisional	Named after	Date	Site	Discoverer(s)	Category	Diam.	Ref
855201	2011 AY_{57}	—	January 11, 2011	Mount Lemmon	Mount Lemmon Survey	·	430 m	MPC · JPL
855202	2011 AR_{62}	—	January 13, 2011	Kitt Peak	Spacewatch	·	600 m	MPC · JPL
855203	2011 AU_{62}	—	January 13, 2011	Kitt Peak	Spacewatch	·	770 m	MPC · JPL
855204	2011 AW_{63}	—	January 14, 2011	Mount Lemmon	Mount Lemmon Survey	·	1.9 km	MPC · JPL
855205	2011 AO_{66}	—	January 23, 2006	Kitt Peak	Spacewatch	·	1.7 km	MPC · JPL
855206	2011 AF_{69}	—	September 16, 2006	Kitt Peak	Spacewatch	·	700 m	MPC · JPL
855207	2011 AV_{69}	—	May 3, 2008	Mount Lemmon	Mount Lemmon Survey	·	840 m	MPC · JPL
855208	2011 AR_{71}	—	January 14, 2011	Mount Lemmon	Mount Lemmon Survey	·	570 m	MPC · JPL
855209	2011 AF_{75}	—	December 29, 2010	Catalina	CSS	JUN	850 m	MPC · JPL
855210	2011 AQ_{78}	—	January 15, 2011	Mount Lemmon	Mount Lemmon Survey	VER	1.9 km	MPC · JPL
855211	2011 AL_{79}	—	February 25, 2011	Catalina	CSS	·	2.8 km	MPC · JPL
855212	2011 AN_{81}	—	January 15, 2011	Mount Lemmon	Mount Lemmon Survey	·	1.5 km	MPC · JPL
855213	2011 AD_{82}	—	January 4, 2011	Mount Lemmon	Mount Lemmon Survey	·	1.6 km	MPC · JPL
855214	2011 AD_{83}	—	January 14, 2011	Kitt Peak	Spacewatch	THM	1.6 km	MPC · JPL
855215	2011 AK_{83}	—	January 15, 2011	Mount Lemmon	Mount Lemmon Survey	·	2.4 km	MPC · JPL
855216	2011 AL_{83}	—	January 15, 2011	Mount Lemmon	Mount Lemmon Survey	·	2.0 km	MPC · JPL
855217	2011 AB_{85}	—	March 16, 2015	Mount Lemmon	Mount Lemmon Survey	·	610 m	MPC · JPL
855218	2011 AG_{87}	—	January 8, 2011	Mount Lemmon	Mount Lemmon Survey	·	2.3 km	MPC · JPL
855219	2011 AU_{87}	—	January 14, 2011	Kitt Peak	Spacewatch	·	550 m	MPC · JPL
855220	2011 AY_{87}	—	December 5, 2010	Kitt Peak	Spacewatch	·	2.5 km	MPC · JPL
855221	2011 AR_{88}	—	January 10, 2011	Mount Lemmon	Mount Lemmon Survey	H	330 m	MPC · JPL
855222	2011 AT_{89}	—	January 13, 2011	Mount Lemmon	Mount Lemmon Survey	·	1.3 km	MPC · JPL
855223	2011 AS_{90}	—	February 8, 2015	Mount Lemmon	Mount Lemmon Survey	NYS	810 m	MPC · JPL
855224	2011 AY_{90}	—	January 28, 2017	Haleakala	Pan-STARRS 1	·	2.2 km	MPC · JPL
855225	2011 AY_{91}	—	January 13, 2011	Mount Lemmon	Mount Lemmon Survey	PHO	700 m	MPC · JPL
855226	2011 AQ_{92}	—	January 2, 2011	Mount Lemmon	Mount Lemmon Survey	·	980 m	MPC · JPL
855227	2011 AS_{92}	—	January 14, 2011	Mount Lemmon	Mount Lemmon Survey	·	2.0 km	MPC · JPL
855228	2011 AZ_{92}	—	January 13, 2011	Mount Lemmon	Mount Lemmon Survey	LIX	2.4 km	MPC · JPL
855229	2011 AF_{94}	—	January 13, 2011	Kitt Peak	Spacewatch	T_{j} (2.77)	3.5 km	MPC · JPL
855230	2011 AM_{94}	—	January 10, 2011	Mount Lemmon	Mount Lemmon Survey	·	1.8 km	MPC · JPL
855231	2011 AO_{97}	—	January 12, 2011	Mount Lemmon	Mount Lemmon Survey	H	420 m	MPC · JPL
855232	2011 AP_{97}	—	January 8, 2011	Mount Lemmon	Mount Lemmon Survey	V	430 m	MPC · JPL
855233	2011 AD_{99}	—	January 9, 2011	Mount Lemmon	Mount Lemmon Survey	·	1.3 km	MPC · JPL
855234	2011 AF_{100}	—	January 2, 2011	Mount Lemmon	Mount Lemmon Survey	NYS	690 m	MPC · JPL
855235	2011 AJ_{100}	—	January 14, 2011	Mount Lemmon	Mount Lemmon Survey	·	1.2 km	MPC · JPL
855236	2011 AL_{100}	—	January 8, 2011	Mount Lemmon	Mount Lemmon Survey	EOS	1.3 km	MPC · JPL
855237	2011 AV_{100}	—	January 8, 2011	Mount Lemmon	Mount Lemmon Survey	·	540 m	MPC · JPL
855238	2011 AL_{101}	—	January 10, 2011	Kitt Peak	Spacewatch	EOS	1.4 km	MPC · JPL
855239	2011 AT_{101}	—	January 14, 2011	Kitt Peak	Spacewatch	·	1.7 km	MPC · JPL
855240	2011 AY_{101}	—	January 12, 2011	Mount Lemmon	Mount Lemmon Survey	·	630 m	MPC · JPL
855241	2011 AS_{102}	—	January 8, 2011	Mount Lemmon	Mount Lemmon Survey	·	2.1 km	MPC · JPL
855242	2011 AY_{102}	—	January 3, 2011	Mount Lemmon	Mount Lemmon Survey	·	1.8 km	MPC · JPL
855243	2011 AD_{103}	—	January 13, 2011	Kitt Peak	Spacewatch	·	750 m	MPC · JPL
855244	2011 AL_{105}	—	January 2, 2011	Mount Lemmon	Mount Lemmon Survey	·	1.0 km	MPC · JPL
855245	2011 AA_{106}	—	December 18, 2004	Mount Lemmon	Mount Lemmon Survey	·	2.4 km	MPC · JPL
855246	2011 AD_{106}	—	January 13, 2011	Mount Lemmon	Mount Lemmon Survey	·	690 m	MPC · JPL
855247	2011 AQ_{106}	—	January 2, 2011	Mount Lemmon	Mount Lemmon Survey	·	1.6 km	MPC · JPL
855248	2011 AU_{106}	—	January 10, 2011	Kitt Peak	Spacewatch	·	1.6 km	MPC · JPL
855249	2011 AX_{106}	—	January 10, 2011	Kitt Peak	Spacewatch	·	2.2 km	MPC · JPL
855250	2011 AO_{108}	—	January 2, 2011	Mount Lemmon	Mount Lemmon Survey	·	480 m	MPC · JPL
855251	2011 AX_{109}	—	January 14, 2011	Kitt Peak	Spacewatch	URS	2.2 km	MPC · JPL
855252	2011 BP_{1}	—	January 26, 2006	Kitt Peak	Spacewatch	·	1.4 km	MPC · JPL
855253	2011 BO_{5}	—	January 16, 2011	Mount Lemmon	Mount Lemmon Survey	·	400 m	MPC · JPL
855254	2011 BQ_{5}	—	January 16, 2011	Mount Lemmon	Mount Lemmon Survey	·	1.5 km	MPC · JPL
855255	2011 BU_{14}	—	January 25, 2011	Mount Lemmon	Mount Lemmon Survey	H	400 m	MPC · JPL
855256	2011 BK_{15}	—	January 25, 2011	Kitt Peak	Spacewatch	·	1.9 km	MPC · JPL
855257	2011 BF_{23}	—	November 21, 2005	Kitt Peak	Spacewatch	·	1.0 km	MPC · JPL
855258	2011 BK_{23}	—	January 14, 2011	Kitt Peak	Spacewatch	·	2.0 km	MPC · JPL
855259	2011 BR_{25}	—	January 23, 2011	Mount Lemmon	Mount Lemmon Survey	·	1.7 km	MPC · JPL
855260	2011 BF_{32}	—	January 27, 2011	Kitt Peak	Spacewatch	MAS	530 m	MPC · JPL
855261	2011 BF_{35}	—	January 28, 2011	Mount Lemmon	Mount Lemmon Survey	V	450 m	MPC · JPL
855262	2011 BS_{35}	—	January 28, 2011	Mount Lemmon	Mount Lemmon Survey	·	440 m	MPC · JPL
855263	2011 BW_{36}	—	January 28, 2011	Mount Lemmon	Mount Lemmon Survey	EOS	1.4 km	MPC · JPL
855264	2011 BQ_{40}	—	January 16, 2011	Alder Springs	K. Levin, N. Teamo	THB	2.3 km	MPC · JPL
855265	2011 BY_{41}	—	January 30, 2011	Piszkés-tető	K. Sárneczky, Z. Kuli	·	2.6 km	MPC · JPL
855266	2011 BU_{54}	—	January 30, 2011	Mount Lemmon	Mount Lemmon Survey	·	1.4 km	MPC · JPL
855267	2011 BW_{56}	—	January 30, 2011	Mount Lemmon	Mount Lemmon Survey	·	910 m	MPC · JPL
855268	2011 BG_{60}	—	January 11, 2011	Kitt Peak	Spacewatch	THB	2.1 km	MPC · JPL
855269	2011 BU_{64}	—	January 29, 2011	Mount Lemmon	Mount Lemmon Survey	·	1.4 km	MPC · JPL
855270	2011 BD_{67}	—	February 5, 2011	Mount Lemmon	Mount Lemmon Survey	·	2.0 km	MPC · JPL
855271	2011 BM_{67}	—	February 26, 2008	Mount Lemmon	Mount Lemmon Survey	·	490 m	MPC · JPL
855272	2011 BW_{67}	—	October 8, 1999	Kitt Peak	Spacewatch	·	920 m	MPC · JPL
855273	2011 BC_{68}	—	January 28, 2011	Mount Lemmon	Mount Lemmon Survey	·	1.0 km	MPC · JPL
855274	2011 BP_{68}	—	January 8, 2011	Mount Lemmon	Mount Lemmon Survey	·	910 m	MPC · JPL
855275	2011 BE_{69}	—	January 29, 2011	Mount Lemmon	Mount Lemmon Survey	·	1.5 km	MPC · JPL
855276	2011 BY_{69}	—	January 29, 2011	Mount Lemmon	Mount Lemmon Survey	·	1.4 km	MPC · JPL
855277	2011 BO_{70}	—	February 5, 2011	Haleakala	Pan-STARRS 1	·	2.0 km	MPC · JPL
855278	2011 BL_{71}	—	March 2, 2011	Mount Lemmon	Mount Lemmon Survey	·	1.3 km	MPC · JPL
855279	2011 BX_{71}	—	February 10, 2011	Mount Lemmon	Mount Lemmon Survey	·	1.6 km	MPC · JPL
855280	2011 BS_{72}	—	February 5, 2011	Haleakala	Pan-STARRS 1	·	1.3 km	MPC · JPL
855281	2011 BU_{74}	—	February 5, 2011	Haleakala	Pan-STARRS 1	·	1.2 km	MPC · JPL
855282	2011 BV_{78}	—	January 13, 2011	Kitt Peak	Spacewatch	·	1.1 km	MPC · JPL
855283	2011 BQ_{86}	—	January 27, 2011	Mount Lemmon	Mount Lemmon Survey	·	780 m	MPC · JPL
855284	2011 BN_{94}	—	December 5, 2010	Mount Lemmon	Mount Lemmon Survey	·	2.0 km	MPC · JPL
855285	2011 BY_{97}	—	January 29, 2011	Mount Lemmon	Mount Lemmon Survey	·	860 m	MPC · JPL
855286	2011 BY_{98}	—	December 8, 2010	Mount Lemmon	Mount Lemmon Survey	T_{j} (2.99)	2.5 km	MPC · JPL
855287	2011 BZ_{104}	—	January 28, 2011	Mount Lemmon	Mount Lemmon Survey	·	2.2 km	MPC · JPL
855288	2011 BO_{105}	—	January 28, 2011	Mount Lemmon	Mount Lemmon Survey	·	860 m	MPC · JPL
855289	2011 BY_{105}	—	November 13, 2010	Mount Lemmon	Mount Lemmon Survey	·	2.4 km	MPC · JPL
855290	2011 BD_{108}	—	March 2, 2011	Mount Lemmon	Mount Lemmon Survey	·	2.3 km	MPC · JPL
855291	2011 BZ_{108}	—	February 10, 2011	Mount Lemmon	Mount Lemmon Survey	·	2.0 km	MPC · JPL
855292	2011 BR_{109}	—	February 12, 2011	Mount Lemmon	Mount Lemmon Survey	·	2.0 km	MPC · JPL
855293	2011 BO_{111}	—	March 6, 2011	Mount Lemmon	Mount Lemmon Survey	URS	1.9 km	MPC · JPL
855294	2011 BK_{112}	—	March 6, 2011	Mount Lemmon	Mount Lemmon Survey	·	1.0 km	MPC · JPL
855295	2011 BB_{113}	—	February 5, 2011	Haleakala	Pan-STARRS 1	·	2.0 km	MPC · JPL
855296	2011 BN_{113}	—	February 12, 2011	Mount Lemmon	Mount Lemmon Survey	·	1.5 km	MPC · JPL
855297	2011 BU_{113}	—	February 5, 2011	Haleakala	Pan-STARRS 1	·	430 m	MPC · JPL
855298	2011 BU_{116}	—	January 14, 2011	Kitt Peak	Spacewatch	TIR	2.1 km	MPC · JPL
855299	2011 BZ_{119}	—	February 21, 2007	Mount Lemmon	Mount Lemmon Survey	(5)	730 m	MPC · JPL
855300	2011 BA_{125}	—	May 14, 2008	Mount Lemmon	Mount Lemmon Survey	NYS	720 m	MPC · JPL

== 855301–855400 ==
back to top

Designation			Discovery			Properties		Ref
Permanent	Provisional	Named after	Date	Site	Discoverer(s)	Category	Diam.	Ref
855301	2011 BD_{126}	—	January 10, 2011	Kitt Peak	Spacewatch	·	460 m	MPC · JPL
855302	2011 BH_{128}	—	January 28, 2011	Mount Lemmon	Mount Lemmon Survey	·	1.1 km	MPC · JPL
855303	2011 BP_{128}	—	January 28, 2011	Mount Lemmon	Mount Lemmon Survey	H	320 m	MPC · JPL
855304	2011 BQ_{129}	—	January 28, 2011	Mount Lemmon	Mount Lemmon Survey	·	1.6 km	MPC · JPL
855305	2011 BH_{133}	—	January 29, 2011	Mount Lemmon	Mount Lemmon Survey	H	370 m	MPC · JPL
855306	2011 BF_{137}	—	January 29, 2011	Mount Lemmon	Mount Lemmon Survey	·	830 m	MPC · JPL
855307	2011 BX_{138}	—	January 8, 2011	Mount Lemmon	Mount Lemmon Survey	·	840 m	MPC · JPL
855308	2011 BM_{140}	—	February 21, 2007	Kitt Peak	Spacewatch	·	910 m	MPC · JPL
855309	2011 BK_{144}	—	January 29, 2011	Mount Lemmon	Mount Lemmon Survey	·	850 m	MPC · JPL
855310	2011 BT_{144}	—	January 29, 2011	Mount Lemmon	Mount Lemmon Survey	THM	1.8 km	MPC · JPL
855311	2011 BJ_{145}	—	March 24, 2006	Mount Lemmon	Mount Lemmon Survey	THM	1.8 km	MPC · JPL
855312	2011 BM_{145}	—	January 29, 2011	Mount Lemmon	Mount Lemmon Survey	BRA	1.1 km	MPC · JPL
855313	2011 BV_{150}	—	January 29, 2011	Mount Lemmon	Mount Lemmon Survey	·	950 m	MPC · JPL
855314	2011 BP_{151}	—	January 29, 2011	Mount Lemmon	Mount Lemmon Survey	(2076)	490 m	MPC · JPL
855315	2011 BP_{154}	—	January 27, 2011	Mount Lemmon	Mount Lemmon Survey	·	890 m	MPC · JPL
855316	2011 BQ_{154}	—	October 14, 2009	Mount Lemmon	Mount Lemmon Survey	THM	1.5 km	MPC · JPL
855317	2011 BY_{154}	—	January 27, 2011	Mount Lemmon	Mount Lemmon Survey	H	340 m	MPC · JPL
855318	2011 BL_{156}	—	January 28, 2011	Mount Lemmon	Mount Lemmon Survey	·	1.1 km	MPC · JPL
855319	2011 BD_{158}	—	January 29, 2011	Mount Lemmon	Mount Lemmon Survey	·	2.3 km	MPC · JPL
855320	2011 BD_{159}	—	January 29, 2011	Mount Lemmon	Mount Lemmon Survey	BRA	870 m	MPC · JPL
855321	2011 BZ_{163}	—	February 10, 2011	Mount Lemmon	Mount Lemmon Survey	H	410 m	MPC · JPL
855322	2011 BK_{167}	—	September 22, 2009	Kitt Peak	Spacewatch	·	1.2 km	MPC · JPL
855323	2011 BT_{167}	—	October 1, 2005	Mount Lemmon	Mount Lemmon Survey	·	710 m	MPC · JPL
855324	2011 BD_{169}	—	February 8, 2011	Mount Lemmon	Mount Lemmon Survey	·	1.8 km	MPC · JPL
855325	2011 BF_{170}	—	January 27, 2011	Mount Lemmon	Mount Lemmon Survey	·	790 m	MPC · JPL
855326	2011 BG_{170}	—	January 29, 2011	Mount Lemmon	Mount Lemmon Survey	NYS	950 m	MPC · JPL
855327	2011 BL_{170}	—	February 8, 2011	Mount Lemmon	Mount Lemmon Survey	NYS	820 m	MPC · JPL
855328	2011 BG_{171}	—	September 10, 2013	Haleakala	Pan-STARRS 1	·	1.0 km	MPC · JPL
855329	2011 BV_{173}	—	February 8, 2011	Mount Lemmon	Mount Lemmon Survey	·	800 m	MPC · JPL
855330	2011 BG_{174}	—	January 16, 2011	Mount Lemmon	Mount Lemmon Survey	·	520 m	MPC · JPL
855331	2011 BM_{174}	—	January 23, 2011	Mount Lemmon	Mount Lemmon Survey	·	2.1 km	MPC · JPL
855332	2011 BP_{174}	—	December 9, 2015	Haleakala	Pan-STARRS 1	LIX	2.4 km	MPC · JPL
855333	2011 BP_{175}	—	September 2, 2013	Mount Lemmon	Mount Lemmon Survey	·	1.9 km	MPC · JPL
855334	2011 BH_{176}	—	February 11, 2011	Mount Lemmon	Mount Lemmon Survey	·	760 m	MPC · JPL
855335	2011 BJ_{177}	—	January 28, 2011	Kitt Peak	Spacewatch	·	780 m	MPC · JPL
855336	2011 BK_{177}	—	January 23, 2011	Mount Lemmon	Mount Lemmon Survey	·	550 m	MPC · JPL
855337	2011 BP_{178}	—	February 26, 2011	Mount Lemmon	Mount Lemmon Survey	·	1.4 km	MPC · JPL
855338	2011 BZ_{178}	—	February 11, 2011	Mount Lemmon	Mount Lemmon Survey	·	510 m	MPC · JPL
855339	2011 BA_{179}	—	February 8, 2011	Mount Lemmon	Mount Lemmon Survey	·	860 m	MPC · JPL
855340	2011 BK_{179}	—	November 1, 2013	Haleakala	Pan-STARRS 1	·	450 m	MPC · JPL
855341	2011 BM_{179}	—	January 29, 2011	Kitt Peak	Spacewatch	EOS	1.2 km	MPC · JPL
855342	2011 BV_{179}	—	January 28, 2011	Mount Lemmon	Mount Lemmon Survey	EOS	1.3 km	MPC · JPL
855343	2011 BA_{180}	—	January 28, 2011	Mount Lemmon	Mount Lemmon Survey	·	770 m	MPC · JPL
855344	2011 BF_{180}	—	March 2, 2011	Mount Lemmon	Mount Lemmon Survey	·	2.5 km	MPC · JPL
855345	2011 BJ_{180}	—	January 27, 2011	Mount Lemmon	Mount Lemmon Survey	·	2.3 km	MPC · JPL
855346	2011 BR_{180}	—	February 11, 2011	Mount Lemmon	Mount Lemmon Survey	·	2.2 km	MPC · JPL
855347	2011 BD_{182}	—	July 14, 2016	Haleakala	Pan-STARRS 1	(2076)	580 m	MPC · JPL
855348	2011 BT_{182}	—	August 2, 2016	Haleakala	Pan-STARRS 1	·	630 m	MPC · JPL
855349	2011 BB_{183}	—	April 27, 2012	Haleakala	Pan-STARRS 1	·	490 m	MPC · JPL
855350	2011 BC_{183}	—	February 8, 2011	Mount Lemmon	Mount Lemmon Survey	·	2.3 km	MPC · JPL
855351	2011 BJ_{183}	—	August 26, 2013	Haleakala	Pan-STARRS 1	·	830 m	MPC · JPL
855352	2011 BJ_{184}	—	June 7, 2013	Haleakala	Pan-STARRS 1	·	1.8 km	MPC · JPL
855353	2011 BX_{184}	—	February 24, 2017	Haleakala	Pan-STARRS 1	·	2.0 km	MPC · JPL
855354	2011 BY_{184}	—	September 15, 2014	Mount Lemmon	Mount Lemmon Survey	EOS	1.4 km	MPC · JPL
855355	2011 BH_{185}	—	October 26, 2013	Mount Lemmon	Mount Lemmon Survey	·	420 m	MPC · JPL
855356	2011 BM_{185}	—	August 27, 2014	Haleakala	Pan-STARRS 1	EOS	1.3 km	MPC · JPL
855357	2011 BG_{186}	—	February 8, 2011	Mount Lemmon	Mount Lemmon Survey	·	2.4 km	MPC · JPL
855358	2011 BX_{186}	—	January 30, 2011	Mount Lemmon	Mount Lemmon Survey	·	480 m	MPC · JPL
855359	2011 BG_{188}	—	September 30, 2003	Kitt Peak	Spacewatch	·	2.1 km	MPC · JPL
855360	2011 BJ_{188}	—	August 12, 2013	Haleakala	Pan-STARRS 1	·	2.3 km	MPC · JPL
855361	2011 BV_{188}	—	June 14, 2012	Mount Lemmon	Mount Lemmon Survey	·	520 m	MPC · JPL
855362	2011 BZ_{188}	—	April 11, 2015	Kitt Peak	Spacewatch	·	500 m	MPC · JPL
855363	2011 BA_{189}	—	February 5, 2011	Mount Lemmon	Mount Lemmon Survey	·	510 m	MPC · JPL
855364	2011 BP_{189}	—	March 6, 2011	Mount Lemmon	Mount Lemmon Survey	·	2.3 km	MPC · JPL
855365	2011 BS_{189}	—	August 22, 2014	Haleakala	Pan-STARRS 1	·	1.6 km	MPC · JPL
855366	2011 BF_{190}	—	October 3, 2014	Kitt Peak	Spacewatch	·	2.0 km	MPC · JPL
855367	2011 BH_{190}	—	March 19, 2017	Haleakala	Pan-STARRS 1	·	1.7 km	MPC · JPL
855368	2011 BP_{190}	—	January 30, 2011	Haleakala	Pan-STARRS 1	KON	1.7 km	MPC · JPL
855369	2011 BY_{190}	—	January 30, 2011	Haleakala	Pan-STARRS 1	·	2.2 km	MPC · JPL
855370	2011 BR_{192}	—	July 13, 2013	Haleakala	Pan-STARRS 1	·	1.7 km	MPC · JPL
855371	2011 BZ_{194}	—	January 29, 2011	Mayhill-ISON	L. Elenin	·	1.1 km	MPC · JPL
855372	2011 BJ_{195}	—	January 28, 2011	Mount Lemmon	Mount Lemmon Survey	·	810 m	MPC · JPL
855373	2011 BT_{195}	—	January 30, 2011	Haleakala	Pan-STARRS 1	·	900 m	MPC · JPL
855374	2011 BA_{196}	—	January 16, 2011	Mount Lemmon	Mount Lemmon Survey	KOR	980 m	MPC · JPL
855375	2011 BC_{196}	—	January 28, 2011	Mauna Kea	P. A. Wiegert	·	1.1 km	MPC · JPL
855376	2011 BB_{197}	—	January 30, 2011	Mount Lemmon	Mount Lemmon Survey	·	930 m	MPC · JPL
855377	2011 BD_{197}	—	January 30, 2011	Haleakala	Pan-STARRS 1	·	2.1 km	MPC · JPL
855378	2011 BL_{197}	—	January 30, 2011	Mount Lemmon	Mount Lemmon Survey	·	2.2 km	MPC · JPL
855379	2011 BM_{197}	—	January 26, 2011	Mount Lemmon	Mount Lemmon Survey	EOS	1.1 km	MPC · JPL
855380	2011 BH_{198}	—	January 30, 2011	Haleakala	Pan-STARRS 1	·	680 m	MPC · JPL
855381	2011 BN_{198}	—	January 30, 2011	Kitt Peak	Spacewatch	TIR	2.0 km	MPC · JPL
855382	2011 BE_{199}	—	January 29, 2011	Mount Lemmon	Mount Lemmon Survey	EOS	1.4 km	MPC · JPL
855383	2011 BF_{199}	—	January 26, 2011	Mount Lemmon	Mount Lemmon Survey	·	1.9 km	MPC · JPL
855384	2011 BQ_{199}	—	January 29, 2011	Mount Lemmon	Mount Lemmon Survey	·	1.3 km	MPC · JPL
855385	2011 BL_{200}	—	January 29, 2011	Kitt Peak	Spacewatch	·	620 m	MPC · JPL
855386	2011 BP_{200}	—	January 30, 2011	Mount Lemmon	Mount Lemmon Survey	·	1.8 km	MPC · JPL
855387	2011 BU_{200}	—	January 16, 2011	Mount Lemmon	Mount Lemmon Survey	·	440 m	MPC · JPL
855388	2011 BX_{200}	—	January 28, 2011	Mount Lemmon	Mount Lemmon Survey	·	400 m	MPC · JPL
855389	2011 BA_{201}	—	January 28, 2011	Mount Lemmon	Mount Lemmon Survey	·	1.9 km	MPC · JPL
855390	2011 BV_{202}	—	January 27, 2011	Mount Lemmon	Mount Lemmon Survey	·	500 m	MPC · JPL
855391	2011 BS_{203}	—	January 30, 2011	Mount Lemmon	Mount Lemmon Survey	·	610 m	MPC · JPL
855392	2011 BC_{204}	—	February 14, 2008	Nogales	P. R. Holvorcem, M. Schwartz	·	840 m	MPC · JPL
855393	2011 BC_{206}	—	January 29, 2011	Mount Lemmon	Mount Lemmon Survey	·	1.9 km	MPC · JPL
855394	2011 BD_{207}	—	January 30, 2011	Mount Lemmon	Mount Lemmon Survey	EOS	1.3 km	MPC · JPL
855395	2011 BG_{208}	—	January 30, 2011	Haleakala	Pan-STARRS 1	·	500 m	MPC · JPL
855396	2011 BK_{208}	—	January 23, 2011	Mount Lemmon	Mount Lemmon Survey	·	1.2 km	MPC · JPL
855397	2011 BZ_{210}	—	January 30, 2011	Mount Lemmon	Mount Lemmon Survey	H	320 m	MPC · JPL
855398	2011 BM_{211}	—	January 28, 2011	Kitt Peak	Spacewatch	H	360 m	MPC · JPL
855399	2011 CJ_{7}	—	February 5, 2011	Mount Lemmon	Mount Lemmon Survey	·	2.1 km	MPC · JPL
855400	2011 CN_{7}	—	February 5, 2011	Mount Lemmon	Mount Lemmon Survey	·	1.2 km	MPC · JPL

== 855401–855500 ==
back to top

Designation			Discovery			Properties		Ref
Permanent	Provisional	Named after	Date	Site	Discoverer(s)	Category	Diam.	Ref
855401	2011 CP_{13}	—	February 5, 2011	Mount Lemmon	Mount Lemmon Survey	·	1.3 km	MPC · JPL
855402	2011 CB_{20}	—	January 26, 2011	Mount Lemmon	Mount Lemmon Survey	·	800 m	MPC · JPL
855403	2011 CR_{20}	—	February 7, 2011	Mount Lemmon	Mount Lemmon Survey	·	870 m	MPC · JPL
855404	2011 CB_{22}	—	January 29, 2011	Kitt Peak	Spacewatch	H	400 m	MPC · JPL
855405	2011 CM_{28}	—	January 30, 2011	Mount Lemmon	Mount Lemmon Survey	·	480 m	MPC · JPL
855406	2011 CG_{30}	—	January 16, 2011	Mount Lemmon	Mount Lemmon Survey	·	700 m	MPC · JPL
855407	2011 CE_{34}	—	January 27, 2011	Mount Lemmon	Mount Lemmon Survey	H	440 m	MPC · JPL
855408	2011 CJ_{39}	—	February 5, 2011	Mount Lemmon	Mount Lemmon Survey	ADE	1.1 km	MPC · JPL
855409	2011 CF_{43}	—	February 5, 2011	Mount Lemmon	Mount Lemmon Survey	HOF	1.6 km	MPC · JPL
855410	2011 CL_{45}	—	February 8, 2011	Mount Lemmon	Mount Lemmon Survey	·	1.2 km	MPC · JPL
855411	2011 CO_{49}	—	January 14, 2011	Kitt Peak	Spacewatch	MAS	540 m	MPC · JPL
855412	2011 CK_{51}	—	February 7, 2011	Mount Lemmon	Mount Lemmon Survey	·	1.9 km	MPC · JPL
855413	2011 CX_{54}	—	February 8, 2011	Mount Lemmon	Mount Lemmon Survey	·	440 m	MPC · JPL
855414	2011 CV_{58}	—	March 11, 2007	Kitt Peak	Spacewatch	·	960 m	MPC · JPL
855415	2011 CC_{60}	—	January 27, 2011	Mount Lemmon	Mount Lemmon Survey	3:2	3.7 km	MPC · JPL
855416	2011 CH_{62}	—	January 28, 2011	Mount Lemmon	Mount Lemmon Survey	·	460 m	MPC · JPL
855417	2011 CM_{73}	—	January 24, 2011	Mount Lemmon	Mount Lemmon Survey	·	2.8 km	MPC · JPL
855418	2011 CY_{77}	—	February 13, 2011	Mount Lemmon	Mount Lemmon Survey	PHO	730 m	MPC · JPL
855419	2011 CW_{83}	—	February 5, 2011	Haleakala	Pan-STARRS 1	·	480 m	MPC · JPL
855420	2011 CK_{84}	—	February 25, 2011	Mount Lemmon	Mount Lemmon Survey	·	640 m	MPC · JPL
855421	2011 CN_{84}	—	February 10, 2011	Mount Lemmon	Mount Lemmon Survey	·	2.0 km	MPC · JPL
855422	2011 CA_{86}	—	March 1, 2011	Catalina	CSS	·	2.0 km	MPC · JPL
855423	2011 CF_{87}	—	January 30, 2000	Kitt Peak	Spacewatch	H	400 m	MPC · JPL
855424	2011 CN_{92}	—	February 5, 2011	Haleakala	Pan-STARRS 1	·	1.8 km	MPC · JPL
855425	2011 CQ_{92}	—	February 5, 2011	Haleakala	Pan-STARRS 1	ELF	2.3 km	MPC · JPL
855426	2011 CX_{92}	—	February 5, 2011	Haleakala	Pan-STARRS 1	·	1.0 km	MPC · JPL
855427	2011 CD_{93}	—	February 12, 2011	Mount Lemmon	Mount Lemmon Survey	·	2.1 km	MPC · JPL
855428	2011 CO_{93}	—	March 1, 2011	Mount Lemmon	Mount Lemmon Survey	·	550 m	MPC · JPL
855429	2011 CD_{94}	—	February 4, 2011	Haleakala	Pan-STARRS 1	H	360 m	MPC · JPL
855430	2011 CR_{98}	—	February 5, 2011	Haleakala	Pan-STARRS 1	·	670 m	MPC · JPL
855431	2011 CV_{99}	—	November 24, 2009	Kitt Peak	Spacewatch	·	2.3 km	MPC · JPL
855432	2011 CX_{99}	—	February 5, 2011	Haleakala	Pan-STARRS 1	H	360 m	MPC · JPL
855433	2011 CE_{101}	—	February 5, 2011	Haleakala	Pan-STARRS 1	·	490 m	MPC · JPL
855434	2011 CX_{102}	—	March 6, 2011	Mount Lemmon	Mount Lemmon Survey	·	2.5 km	MPC · JPL
855435	2011 CZ_{102}	—	February 5, 2011	Haleakala	Pan-STARRS 1	·	430 m	MPC · JPL
855436	2011 CS_{103}	—	February 5, 2011	Haleakala	Pan-STARRS 1	·	2.1 km	MPC · JPL
855437	2011 CY_{103}	—	February 5, 2011	Haleakala	Pan-STARRS 1	MAS	490 m	MPC · JPL
855438	2011 CQ_{104}	—	March 6, 2011	Mount Lemmon	Mount Lemmon Survey	·	660 m	MPC · JPL
855439	2011 CG_{106}	—	February 25, 2011	Kitt Peak	Spacewatch	·	1.3 km	MPC · JPL
855440	2011 CZ_{106}	—	February 25, 2011	Mount Lemmon	Mount Lemmon Survey	·	580 m	MPC · JPL
855441	2011 CP_{110}	—	February 26, 2011	Mount Lemmon	Mount Lemmon Survey	·	1.1 km	MPC · JPL
855442	2011 CX_{110}	—	February 5, 2011	Haleakala	Pan-STARRS 1	VER	1.8 km	MPC · JPL
855443	2011 CF_{111}	—	February 5, 2011	Haleakala	Pan-STARRS 1	·	1.7 km	MPC · JPL
855444	2011 CM_{115}	—	September 18, 2009	Kitt Peak	Spacewatch	·	1.3 km	MPC · JPL
855445	2011 CJ_{116}	—	February 5, 2011	Haleakala	Pan-STARRS 1	·	980 m	MPC · JPL
855446	2011 CJ_{121}	—	February 12, 2011	Mount Lemmon	Mount Lemmon Survey	·	870 m	MPC · JPL
855447	2011 CL_{121}	—	February 13, 2011	Mount Lemmon	Mount Lemmon Survey	EUN	730 m	MPC · JPL
855448	2011 CE_{122}	—	February 12, 2011	Mount Lemmon	Mount Lemmon Survey	·	1.1 km	MPC · JPL
855449	2011 CM_{123}	—	February 12, 2011	Catalina	CSS	·	880 m	MPC · JPL
855450	2011 CR_{123}	—	February 16, 2015	Haleakala	Pan-STARRS 1	·	990 m	MPC · JPL
855451	2011 CF_{124}	—	February 13, 2011	Mount Lemmon	Mount Lemmon Survey	EUP	2.7 km	MPC · JPL
855452	2011 CK_{125}	—	August 23, 2017	Haleakala	Pan-STARRS 1	H	310 m	MPC · JPL
855453	2011 CO_{125}	—	February 4, 2011	Haleakala	Pan-STARRS 1	(895)	2.5 km	MPC · JPL
855454	2011 CU_{125}	—	February 25, 2011	Mount Lemmon	Mount Lemmon Survey	·	1.7 km	MPC · JPL
855455	2011 CV_{125}	—	July 27, 2017	Haleakala	Pan-STARRS 1	H	350 m	MPC · JPL
855456	2011 CN_{126}	—	October 5, 2014	Mount Lemmon	Mount Lemmon Survey	·	2.7 km	MPC · JPL
855457	2011 CS_{127}	—	February 24, 2017	Haleakala	Pan-STARRS 1	·	2.5 km	MPC · JPL
855458	2011 CY_{127}	—	November 20, 2014	Mount Lemmon	Mount Lemmon Survey	·	1.3 km	MPC · JPL
855459	2011 CH_{128}	—	February 10, 2011	Mount Lemmon	Mount Lemmon Survey	ELF	2.4 km	MPC · JPL
855460	2011 CA_{129}	—	April 2, 2011	Haleakala	Pan-STARRS 1	·	660 m	MPC · JPL
855461	2011 CE_{130}	—	February 12, 2011	Mount Lemmon	Mount Lemmon Survey	EUN	940 m	MPC · JPL
855462	2011 CW_{130}	—	February 5, 2011	Haleakala	Pan-STARRS 1	·	2.0 km	MPC · JPL
855463	2011 CL_{131}	—	February 10, 2011	Mount Lemmon	Mount Lemmon Survey	·	1.3 km	MPC · JPL
855464	2011 CO_{131}	—	February 10, 2011	Mount Lemmon	Mount Lemmon Survey	·	710 m	MPC · JPL
855465	2011 CS_{131}	—	February 8, 2011	Mount Lemmon	Mount Lemmon Survey	·	2.0 km	MPC · JPL
855466	2011 CS_{133}	—	February 7, 2011	Mount Lemmon	Mount Lemmon Survey	·	1.2 km	MPC · JPL
855467	2011 CA_{135}	—	February 5, 2011	Haleakala	Pan-STARRS 1	·	1.9 km	MPC · JPL
855468	2011 CC_{135}	—	February 8, 2011	Mount Lemmon	Mount Lemmon Survey	·	1.5 km	MPC · JPL
855469	2011 CX_{135}	—	February 3, 2011	Piszkés-tető	K. Sárneczky, Z. Kuli	·	1.8 km	MPC · JPL
855470	2011 CB_{136}	—	February 5, 2011	Mount Lemmon	Mount Lemmon Survey	·	1.8 km	MPC · JPL
855471	2011 CH_{136}	—	February 7, 2011	Mount Lemmon	Mount Lemmon Survey	EUN	890 m	MPC · JPL
855472	2011 CK_{136}	—	February 7, 2011	Mount Lemmon	Mount Lemmon Survey	·	740 m	MPC · JPL
855473	2011 CN_{137}	—	February 8, 2011	Mount Lemmon	Mount Lemmon Survey	·	2.0 km	MPC · JPL
855474	2011 CZ_{137}	—	February 10, 2011	Mount Lemmon	Mount Lemmon Survey	·	2.0 km	MPC · JPL
855475	2011 CC_{138}	—	February 7, 2011	Mount Lemmon	Mount Lemmon Survey	·	450 m	MPC · JPL
855476	2011 CO_{138}	—	February 7, 2011	Mount Lemmon	Mount Lemmon Survey	·	2.1 km	MPC · JPL
855477	2011 CP_{139}	—	September 21, 2009	Kitt Peak	Spacewatch	·	530 m	MPC · JPL
855478	2011 CS_{140}	—	February 8, 2011	Mount Lemmon	Mount Lemmon Survey	NYS	590 m	MPC · JPL
855479	2011 CC_{141}	—	February 5, 2011	Haleakala	Pan-STARRS 1	VER	2.1 km	MPC · JPL
855480	2011 CH_{141}	—	February 11, 2011	Mount Lemmon	Mount Lemmon Survey	·	2.5 km	MPC · JPL
855481	2011 CF_{144}	—	February 13, 2011	Mount Lemmon	Mount Lemmon Survey	·	1.8 km	MPC · JPL
855482	2011 CP_{144}	—	February 11, 2011	Mount Lemmon	Mount Lemmon Survey	·	1.7 km	MPC · JPL
855483	2011 CU_{144}	—	February 8, 2011	Mount Lemmon	Mount Lemmon Survey	·	1.9 km	MPC · JPL
855484	2011 CW_{144}	—	February 13, 2011	Mount Lemmon	Mount Lemmon Survey	·	1.9 km	MPC · JPL
855485	2011 CG_{145}	—	February 7, 2011	Mount Lemmon	Mount Lemmon Survey	·	1.8 km	MPC · JPL
855486	2011 CM_{147}	—	February 13, 2011	Mount Lemmon	Mount Lemmon Survey	·	700 m	MPC · JPL
855487	2011 CY_{148}	—	February 5, 2011	Haleakala	Pan-STARRS 1	·	530 m	MPC · JPL
855488	2011 CS_{149}	—	February 11, 2011	Mount Lemmon	Mount Lemmon Survey	·	890 m	MPC · JPL
855489	2011 CA_{155}	—	February 5, 2011	Haleakala	Pan-STARRS 1	·	1.8 km	MPC · JPL
855490	2011 CA_{157}	—	February 5, 2011	Haleakala	Pan-STARRS 1	·	2.3 km	MPC · JPL
855491	2011 DD_{1}	—	January 14, 2011	Kitt Peak	Spacewatch	·	2.0 km	MPC · JPL
855492	2011 DU_{1}	—	February 22, 2011	Kitt Peak	Spacewatch	H	360 m	MPC · JPL
855493	2011 DS_{3}	—	February 23, 2011	Kitt Peak	Spacewatch	T_{j} (2.95)	2.1 km	MPC · JPL
855494	2011 DZ_{6}	—	February 25, 2011	Mount Lemmon	Mount Lemmon Survey	H	390 m	MPC · JPL
855495	2011 DG_{10}	—	October 2, 2006	Mount Lemmon	Mount Lemmon Survey	·	600 m	MPC · JPL
855496	2011 DA_{17}	—	February 25, 2011	Mount Lemmon	Mount Lemmon Survey	·	870 m	MPC · JPL
855497	2011 DM_{21}	—	February 25, 2011	Mount Lemmon	Mount Lemmon Survey	NAE	1.7 km	MPC · JPL
855498	2011 DS_{28}	—	February 25, 2011	Mount Lemmon	Mount Lemmon Survey	·	990 m	MPC · JPL
855499	2011 DV_{32}	—	February 25, 2011	Mount Lemmon	Mount Lemmon Survey	MAS	550 m	MPC · JPL
855500	2011 DW_{38}	—	February 25, 2011	Mount Lemmon	Mount Lemmon Survey	·	2.2 km	MPC · JPL

== 855501–855600 ==
back to top

Designation			Discovery			Properties		Ref
Permanent	Provisional	Named after	Date	Site	Discoverer(s)	Category	Diam.	Ref
855501	2011 DX_{41}	—	April 11, 2007	Kitt Peak	Spacewatch	·	1.0 km	MPC · JPL
855502	2011 DD_{43}	—	February 26, 2011	Mount Lemmon	Mount Lemmon Survey	NYS	720 m	MPC · JPL
855503	2011 DY_{43}	—	February 26, 2011	Mount Lemmon	Mount Lemmon Survey	NYS	650 m	MPC · JPL
855504	2011 DN_{44}	—	February 26, 2011	Mount Lemmon	Mount Lemmon Survey	THM	1.7 km	MPC · JPL
855505	2011 DW_{53}	—	February 26, 2011	Catalina	CSS	·	2.5 km	MPC · JPL
855506	2011 DE_{54}	—	February 26, 2011	Mount Lemmon	Mount Lemmon Survey	V	430 m	MPC · JPL
855507	2011 DM_{54}	—	February 25, 2011	Kitt Peak	Spacewatch	·	3.0 km	MPC · JPL
855508	2011 DE_{55}	—	August 9, 2013	Kitt Peak	Spacewatch	·	1.3 km	MPC · JPL
855509	2011 DQ_{55}	—	October 1, 2014	Haleakala	Pan-STARRS 1	·	2.2 km	MPC · JPL
855510	2011 DG_{56}	—	February 25, 2011	Mount Lemmon	Mount Lemmon Survey	·	560 m	MPC · JPL
855511	2011 DZ_{56}	—	February 22, 2011	Kitt Peak	Spacewatch	MAS	430 m	MPC · JPL
855512	2011 DA_{57}	—	February 25, 2011	Mount Lemmon	Mount Lemmon Survey	MAS	560 m	MPC · JPL
855513	2011 DN_{57}	—	February 25, 2011	Mount Lemmon	Mount Lemmon Survey	·	2.1 km	MPC · JPL
855514	2011 DC_{58}	—	February 26, 2011	Mount Lemmon	Mount Lemmon Survey	HYG	1.9 km	MPC · JPL
855515	2011 DK_{58}	—	February 25, 2011	Mount Lemmon	Mount Lemmon Survey	·	2.7 km	MPC · JPL
855516	2011 DN_{58}	—	February 22, 2011	Kitt Peak	Spacewatch	·	2.0 km	MPC · JPL
855517	2011 DU_{60}	—	February 22, 2011	Kitt Peak	Spacewatch	·	1.9 km	MPC · JPL
855518	2011 DD_{61}	—	February 25, 2011	Mount Lemmon	Mount Lemmon Survey	·	2.0 km	MPC · JPL
855519	2011 EN_{2}	—	January 27, 2011	Mount Lemmon	Mount Lemmon Survey	NYS	550 m	MPC · JPL
855520	2011 EW_{5}	—	March 1, 2011	Westfield	International Astronomical Search Collaboration	TIR	2.2 km	MPC · JPL
855521	2011 EU_{7}	—	March 25, 2000	Kitt Peak	Spacewatch	·	2.0 km	MPC · JPL
855522	2011 EQ_{8}	—	February 8, 2011	Mount Lemmon	Mount Lemmon Survey	·	2.1 km	MPC · JPL
855523	2011 EL_{21}	—	September 26, 2009	Kitt Peak	Spacewatch	·	2.0 km	MPC · JPL
855524	2011 EM_{26}	—	March 6, 2011	Mount Lemmon	Mount Lemmon Survey	·	560 m	MPC · JPL
855525	2011 ET_{29}	—	March 7, 2011	Piszkés-tető	K. Sárneczky, J. Kelemen	AMO	570 m	MPC · JPL
855526	2011 EE_{32}	—	November 5, 2005	Kitt Peak	Spacewatch	·	1.1 km	MPC · JPL
855527	2011 EN_{32}	—	March 4, 2011	Mount Lemmon	Mount Lemmon Survey	·	840 m	MPC · JPL
855528	2011 EW_{34}	—	March 4, 2011	Mount Lemmon	Mount Lemmon Survey	H	350 m	MPC · JPL
855529	2011 EU_{36}	—	February 26, 2011	Kitt Peak	Spacewatch	THM	1.8 km	MPC · JPL
855530	2011 EN_{41}	—	September 26, 2003	Sacramento Peak	SDSS	·	2.4 km	MPC · JPL
855531	2011 EK_{46}	—	March 4, 2011	Mount Lemmon	Mount Lemmon Survey	·	860 m	MPC · JPL
855532	2011 ET_{48}	—	March 10, 2011	Mount Lemmon	Mount Lemmon Survey	·	520 m	MPC · JPL
855533	2011 EX_{55}	—	March 12, 2011	Mount Lemmon	Mount Lemmon Survey	·	1.9 km	MPC · JPL
855534	2011 EP_{56}	—	March 12, 2011	Mount Lemmon	Mount Lemmon Survey	V	440 m	MPC · JPL
855535	2011 EU_{56}	—	March 12, 2011	Mount Lemmon	Mount Lemmon Survey	·	860 m	MPC · JPL
855536	2011 EP_{62}	—	March 12, 2011	Mount Lemmon	Mount Lemmon Survey	·	960 m	MPC · JPL
855537	2011 EP_{67}	—	February 9, 2005	Mount Lemmon	Mount Lemmon Survey	·	2.1 km	MPC · JPL
855538	2011 EY_{69}	—	March 10, 2011	Kitt Peak	Spacewatch	H	410 m	MPC · JPL
855539	2011 EN_{74}	—	March 10, 2011	Mount Lemmon	Mount Lemmon Survey	H	320 m	MPC · JPL
855540	2011 EO_{74}	—	March 11, 2011	Mount Lemmon	Mount Lemmon Survey	H	390 m	MPC · JPL
855541	2011 EY_{83}	—	March 1, 2011	Mount Lemmon	Mount Lemmon Survey	EOS	1.2 km	MPC · JPL
855542	2011 EE_{84}	—	March 6, 2011	Mount Lemmon	Mount Lemmon Survey	H	350 m	MPC · JPL
855543	2011 EJ_{84}	—	November 13, 2010	Mount Lemmon	Mount Lemmon Survey	H	560 m	MPC · JPL
855544	2011 EY_{84}	—	March 6, 2011	Mount Lemmon	Mount Lemmon Survey	·	1.7 km	MPC · JPL
855545	2011 EB_{87}	—	January 27, 2007	Mount Lemmon	Mount Lemmon Survey	·	910 m	MPC · JPL
855546	2011 EO_{88}	—	March 6, 2011	Mount Lemmon	Mount Lemmon Survey	H	410 m	MPC · JPL
855547	2011 EY_{91}	—	March 30, 2011	Haleakala	Pan-STARRS 1	H	350 m	MPC · JPL
855548	2011 EQ_{92}	—	June 20, 2013	Haleakala	Pan-STARRS 1	·	1.6 km	MPC · JPL
855549	2011 EW_{92}	—	September 6, 2013	Mount Lemmon	Mount Lemmon Survey	NYS	850 m	MPC · JPL
855550	2011 EX_{92}	—	March 10, 2011	Mount Lemmon	Mount Lemmon Survey	·	1.9 km	MPC · JPL
855551	2011 EY_{92}	—	March 9, 2011	Kitt Peak	Spacewatch	·	760 m	MPC · JPL
855552	2011 EP_{93}	—	March 10, 2011	Kitt Peak	Spacewatch	·	700 m	MPC · JPL
855553	2011 EU_{93}	—	March 11, 2011	Kitt Peak	Spacewatch	·	660 m	MPC · JPL
855554	2011 EJ_{94}	—	March 14, 2011	Mount Lemmon	Mount Lemmon Survey	·	570 m	MPC · JPL
855555	2011 EM_{94}	—	March 13, 2011	Mount Lemmon	Mount Lemmon Survey	·	540 m	MPC · JPL
855556	2011 EO_{94}	—	March 14, 2011	Mount Lemmon	Mount Lemmon Survey	H	310 m	MPC · JPL
855557	2011 EH_{95}	—	March 5, 2011	Catalina	CSS	·	1.3 km	MPC · JPL
855558	2011 EO_{95}	—	January 23, 2015	Haleakala	Pan-STARRS 1	EUN	820 m	MPC · JPL
855559	2011 EF_{96}	—	September 16, 2012	Mount Lemmon	Mount Lemmon Survey	H	360 m	MPC · JPL
855560	2011 EM_{96}	—	March 13, 2016	Haleakala	Pan-STARRS 1	HNS	750 m	MPC · JPL
855561	2011 EO_{96}	—	February 22, 2018	Mount Lemmon	Mount Lemmon Survey	(2076)	660 m	MPC · JPL
855562	2011 EU_{96}	—	March 2, 2011	Kitt Peak	Spacewatch	·	480 m	MPC · JPL
855563	2011 EV_{96}	—	March 12, 2011	Mount Lemmon	Mount Lemmon Survey	·	590 m	MPC · JPL
855564	2011 EZ_{97}	—	January 7, 2016	Haleakala	Pan-STARRS 1	·	1.7 km	MPC · JPL
855565	2011 EB_{98}	—	March 2, 2011	Mount Lemmon	Mount Lemmon Survey	·	630 m	MPC · JPL
855566	2011 EH_{98}	—	June 15, 2018	Haleakala	Pan-STARRS 1	·	2.2 km	MPC · JPL
855567	2011 EJ_{98}	—	March 4, 2011	Mount Lemmon	Mount Lemmon Survey	·	780 m	MPC · JPL
855568	2011 EQ_{98}	—	March 14, 2011	Mount Lemmon	Mount Lemmon Survey	V	470 m	MPC · JPL
855569	2011 ES_{98}	—	March 18, 2018	Haleakala	Pan-STARRS 1	·	560 m	MPC · JPL
855570	2011 ER_{99}	—	March 10, 2011	Kitt Peak	Spacewatch	·	690 m	MPC · JPL
855571	2011 EK_{100}	—	March 13, 2011	Kitt Peak	Spacewatch	·	1.3 km	MPC · JPL
855572	2011 EE_{101}	—	March 14, 2011	Mount Lemmon	Mount Lemmon Survey	·	1.2 km	MPC · JPL
855573	2011 EJ_{101}	—	March 2, 2011	Kitt Peak	Spacewatch	·	2.1 km	MPC · JPL
855574	2011 ER_{101}	—	March 10, 2011	Kitt Peak	Spacewatch	NYS	880 m	MPC · JPL
855575	2011 EN_{102}	—	March 10, 2011	Kitt Peak	Spacewatch	·	1.1 km	MPC · JPL
855576	2011 ER_{102}	—	March 6, 2011	Kitt Peak	Spacewatch	·	950 m	MPC · JPL
855577	2011 EP_{104}	—	March 14, 2011	Mount Lemmon	Mount Lemmon Survey	·	450 m	MPC · JPL
855578	2011 EL_{105}	—	March 10, 2011	Kitt Peak	Spacewatch	·	750 m	MPC · JPL
855579	2011 EL_{106}	—	December 15, 2006	Mount Lemmon	Mount Lemmon Survey	·	490 m	MPC · JPL
855580	2011 EP_{106}	—	March 14, 2011	Mount Lemmon	Mount Lemmon Survey	·	640 m	MPC · JPL
855581	2011 EQ_{106}	—	March 14, 2011	Kitt Peak	Spacewatch	·	480 m	MPC · JPL
855582	2011 EV_{106}	—	March 2, 2011	Mount Lemmon	Mount Lemmon Survey	·	1.5 km	MPC · JPL
855583	2011 EZ_{106}	—	March 12, 2011	Mount Lemmon	Mount Lemmon Survey	·	1.8 km	MPC · JPL
855584	2011 EN_{107}	—	March 11, 2011	Kitt Peak	Spacewatch	·	2.3 km	MPC · JPL
855585	2011 EF_{108}	—	March 4, 2011	Mount Lemmon	Mount Lemmon Survey	·	1.9 km	MPC · JPL
855586	2011 EN_{108}	—	March 2, 2011	Mount Lemmon	Mount Lemmon Survey	·	2.1 km	MPC · JPL
855587	2011 ER_{108}	—	March 6, 2011	Mount Lemmon	Mount Lemmon Survey	·	870 m	MPC · JPL
855588	2011 ES_{108}	—	March 2, 2011	Kitt Peak	Spacewatch	·	1.2 km	MPC · JPL
855589	2011 EC_{110}	—	March 6, 2011	Mount Lemmon	Mount Lemmon Survey	·	800 m	MPC · JPL
855590	2011 EW_{110}	—	March 2, 2011	Kitt Peak	Spacewatch	·	2.3 km	MPC · JPL
855591	2011 EF_{112}	—	September 6, 2008	Kitt Peak	Spacewatch	·	2.2 km	MPC · JPL
855592	2011 EA_{113}	—	March 1, 2011	Mount Lemmon	Mount Lemmon Survey	·	510 m	MPC · JPL
855593	2011 EX_{113}	—	March 14, 2011	Mount Lemmon	Mount Lemmon Survey	·	680 m	MPC · JPL
855594	2011 EM_{116}	—	March 5, 2011	Mount Lemmon	Mount Lemmon Survey	·	2.2 km	MPC · JPL
855595	2011 FJ_{1}	—	March 25, 2011	Mount Lemmon	Mount Lemmon Survey	H	330 m	MPC · JPL
855596	2011 FU_{11}	—	November 20, 2009	Kitt Peak	Spacewatch	·	930 m	MPC · JPL
855597	2011 FT_{18}	—	March 27, 2011	Kitt Peak	Spacewatch	·	770 m	MPC · JPL
855598	2011 FH_{20}	—	December 10, 2009	Mount Lemmon	Mount Lemmon Survey	THM	1.6 km	MPC · JPL
855599	2011 FL_{24}	—	March 28, 2011	Mount Lemmon	Mount Lemmon Survey	·	2.3 km	MPC · JPL
855600	2011 FG_{30}	—	September 20, 2009	Kitt Peak	Spacewatch	H	380 m	MPC · JPL

== 855601–855700 ==
back to top

Designation			Discovery			Properties		Ref
Permanent	Provisional	Named after	Date	Site	Discoverer(s)	Category	Diam.	Ref
855601	2011 FQ_{30}	—	March 27, 2011	Mount Lemmon	Mount Lemmon Survey	H	340 m	MPC · JPL
855602	2011 FF_{31}	—	March 28, 2011	Kitt Peak	Spacewatch	NYS	840 m	MPC · JPL
855603	2011 FV_{34}	—	March 13, 2011	Kitt Peak	Spacewatch	NYS	820 m	MPC · JPL
855604	2011 FO_{36}	—	March 5, 2011	Kitt Peak	Spacewatch	·	1.8 km	MPC · JPL
855605	2011 FQ_{37}	—	March 30, 2011	Piszkés-tető	K. Sárneczky, Z. Kuli	·	990 m	MPC · JPL
855606	2011 FP_{40}	—	February 8, 2011	Mount Lemmon	Mount Lemmon Survey	TIR	2.4 km	MPC · JPL
855607	2011 FG_{49}	—	March 30, 2011	Mount Lemmon	Mount Lemmon Survey	H	300 m	MPC · JPL
855608	2011 FH_{51}	—	March 30, 2011	Piszkés-tető	K. Sárneczky, Z. Kuli	·	960 m	MPC · JPL
855609	2011 FT_{52}	—	March 28, 2011	Mount Lemmon	Mount Lemmon Survey	KOR	1 km	MPC · JPL
855610	2011 FK_{57}	—	March 30, 2011	Mount Lemmon	Mount Lemmon Survey	NYS	830 m	MPC · JPL
855611	2011 FS_{58}	—	March 30, 2011	Mount Lemmon	Mount Lemmon Survey	·	510 m	MPC · JPL
855612	2011 FU_{59}	—	April 26, 2000	Kitt Peak	Spacewatch	·	1.9 km	MPC · JPL
855613	2011 FO_{61}	—	March 30, 2011	Mount Lemmon	Mount Lemmon Survey	·	650 m	MPC · JPL
855614	2011 FB_{62}	—	March 30, 2011	Mount Lemmon	Mount Lemmon Survey	·	1.8 km	MPC · JPL
855615	2011 FN_{62}	—	March 30, 2011	Mount Lemmon	Mount Lemmon Survey	·	1.2 km	MPC · JPL
855616	2011 FC_{66}	—	April 18, 2007	Mount Lemmon	Mount Lemmon Survey	·	900 m	MPC · JPL
855617	2011 FS_{66}	—	March 29, 2011	Kachina	Hobart, J.	·	760 m	MPC · JPL
855618	2011 FS_{67}	—	March 27, 2011	Mount Lemmon	Mount Lemmon Survey	H	250 m	MPC · JPL
855619	2011 FA_{70}	—	March 24, 2011	Catalina	CSS	H	350 m	MPC · JPL
855620	2011 FK_{73}	—	March 5, 2011	Mount Lemmon	Mount Lemmon Survey	NYS	660 m	MPC · JPL
855621	2011 FJ_{75}	—	March 29, 2011	Mount Lemmon	Mount Lemmon Survey	·	700 m	MPC · JPL
855622	2011 FS_{76}	—	March 29, 2011	Mount Lemmon	Mount Lemmon Survey	·	500 m	MPC · JPL
855623	2011 FL_{81}	—	March 28, 2011	Mount Lemmon	Mount Lemmon Survey	·	480 m	MPC · JPL
855624	2011 FY_{81}	—	April 14, 2008	Kitt Peak	Spacewatch	·	480 m	MPC · JPL
855625	2011 FF_{82}	—	March 2, 2011	Kitt Peak	Spacewatch	·	2.4 km	MPC · JPL
855626	2011 FJ_{82}	—	March 3, 2000	Kitt Peak	Spacewatch	NYS	750 m	MPC · JPL
855627	2011 FU_{85}	—	March 29, 2011	Mount Lemmon	Mount Lemmon Survey	·	450 m	MPC · JPL
855628	2011 FE_{86}	—	March 6, 2011	Mount Lemmon	Mount Lemmon Survey	·	1.0 km	MPC · JPL
855629	2011 FD_{87}	—	March 14, 2011	Mount Lemmon	Mount Lemmon Survey	H	370 m	MPC · JPL
855630	2011 FR_{91}	—	September 24, 2008	Kitt Peak	Spacewatch	·	980 m	MPC · JPL
855631	2011 FY_{91}	—	April 23, 2015	Haleakala	Pan-STARRS 1	MAS	570 m	MPC · JPL
855632	2011 FL_{92}	—	March 4, 2011	Kitt Peak	Spacewatch	·	730 m	MPC · JPL
855633	2011 FQ_{95}	—	March 29, 2011	Mount Lemmon	Mount Lemmon Survey	·	420 m	MPC · JPL
855634	2011 FK_{96}	—	March 29, 2011	Mount Lemmon	Mount Lemmon Survey	·	440 m	MPC · JPL
855635	2011 FL_{98}	—	September 3, 2008	Kitt Peak	Spacewatch	·	1.0 km	MPC · JPL
855636	2011 FN_{102}	—	January 2, 2011	Mount Lemmon	Mount Lemmon Survey	·	1.5 km	MPC · JPL
855637	2011 FF_{108}	—	April 5, 2011	Mount Lemmon	Mount Lemmon Survey	·	970 m	MPC · JPL
855638	2011 FE_{109}	—	April 5, 2011	Mount Lemmon	Mount Lemmon Survey	·	790 m	MPC · JPL
855639	2011 FP_{109}	—	January 10, 2007	Mount Lemmon	Mount Lemmon Survey	·	760 m	MPC · JPL
855640	2011 FX_{110}	—	April 1, 2011	Mount Lemmon	Mount Lemmon Survey	·	510 m	MPC · JPL
855641	2011 FV_{111}	—	April 1, 2011	Mount Lemmon	Mount Lemmon Survey	·	1.1 km	MPC · JPL
855642	2011 FV_{112}	—	April 1, 2011	Mount Lemmon	Mount Lemmon Survey	·	470 m	MPC · JPL
855643	2011 FO_{114}	—	April 1, 2011	Mount Lemmon	Mount Lemmon Survey	·	890 m	MPC · JPL
855644	2011 FS_{114}	—	April 2, 2011	Mount Lemmon	Mount Lemmon Survey	·	490 m	MPC · JPL
855645	2011 FV_{115}	—	April 2, 2011	Mount Lemmon	Mount Lemmon Survey	·	1.1 km	MPC · JPL
855646	2011 FD_{116}	—	May 31, 2008	Kitt Peak	Spacewatch	·	520 m	MPC · JPL
855647	2011 FX_{116}	—	March 25, 2011	Haleakala	Pan-STARRS 1	VER	1.8 km	MPC · JPL
855648	2011 FE_{117}	—	April 2, 2011	Mount Lemmon	Mount Lemmon Survey	·	700 m	MPC · JPL
855649	2011 FN_{118}	—	April 1, 2011	Mount Lemmon	Mount Lemmon Survey	·	650 m	MPC · JPL
855650	2011 FR_{123}	—	April 5, 2011	Mount Lemmon	Mount Lemmon Survey	·	1.2 km	MPC · JPL
855651	2011 FC_{127}	—	March 25, 2011	Mount Lemmon	Mount Lemmon Survey	·	2.8 km	MPC · JPL
855652	2011 FV_{128}	—	March 29, 2011	Mount Lemmon	Mount Lemmon Survey	·	780 m	MPC · JPL
855653	2011 FS_{129}	—	March 2, 2011	Mount Lemmon	Mount Lemmon Survey	·	460 m	MPC · JPL
855654	2011 FN_{131}	—	March 2, 2011	Mount Lemmon	Mount Lemmon Survey	V	390 m	MPC · JPL
855655	2011 FQ_{132}	—	January 28, 2011	Kitt Peak	Spacewatch	·	1.3 km	MPC · JPL
855656	2011 FP_{135}	—	March 2, 2011	Kitt Peak	Spacewatch	·	1.9 km	MPC · JPL
855657	2011 FG_{141}	—	March 25, 2011	Haleakala	Pan-STARRS 1	·	520 m	MPC · JPL
855658	2011 FZ_{143}	—	February 25, 2011	Mount Lemmon	Mount Lemmon Survey	·	510 m	MPC · JPL
855659	2011 FC_{145}	—	March 26, 2011	Haleakala	Pan-STARRS 1	EUN	720 m	MPC · JPL
855660	2011 FH_{145}	—	March 31, 2011	Haleakala	Pan-STARRS 1	H	260 m	MPC · JPL
855661	2011 FA_{149}	—	March 30, 2011	Mount Lemmon	Mount Lemmon Survey	·	950 m	MPC · JPL
855662	2011 FG_{154}	—	March 28, 2011	Mount Lemmon	Mount Lemmon Survey	·	480 m	MPC · JPL
855663	2011 FY_{155}	—	March 10, 2011	Kitt Peak	Spacewatch	·	2.3 km	MPC · JPL
855664	2011 FH_{156}	—	March 26, 2011	Mount Lemmon	Mount Lemmon Survey	·	1.9 km	MPC · JPL
855665	2011 FV_{158}	—	September 15, 2009	Kitt Peak	Spacewatch	H	400 m	MPC · JPL
855666	2011 FB_{159}	—	March 24, 2011	Kitt Peak	Spacewatch	PHO	680 m	MPC · JPL
855667	2011 FC_{159}	—	March 25, 2011	Kitt Peak	Spacewatch	·	1.9 km	MPC · JPL
855668	2011 FM_{161}	—	August 20, 2012	Westfield	International Astronomical Search Collaboration	·	930 m	MPC · JPL
855669	2011 FN_{161}	—	October 7, 2012	Haleakala	Pan-STARRS 1	H	460 m	MPC · JPL
855670	2011 FO_{161}	—	March 30, 2011	Mount Lemmon	Mount Lemmon Survey	H	330 m	MPC · JPL
855671	2011 FH_{162}	—	March 27, 2011	Mount Lemmon	Mount Lemmon Survey	·	580 m	MPC · JPL
855672	2011 FN_{162}	—	January 31, 2016	Mount Lemmon	Mount Lemmon Survey	·	2.4 km	MPC · JPL
855673	2011 FA_{163}	—	March 27, 2011	Mount Lemmon	Mount Lemmon Survey	·	690 m	MPC · JPL
855674	2011 FB_{163}	—	March 26, 2011	Kitt Peak	Spacewatch	·	1.6 km	MPC · JPL
855675	2011 FY_{163}	—	August 14, 2013	Haleakala	Pan-STARRS 1	·	2.4 km	MPC · JPL
855676	2011 FP_{164}	—	March 27, 2011	Mount Lemmon	Mount Lemmon Survey	EOS	1.2 km	MPC · JPL
855677	2011 FA_{165}	—	April 25, 2015	Haleakala	Pan-STARRS 1	·	780 m	MPC · JPL
855678	2011 FL_{165}	—	April 5, 2011	Mount Lemmon	Mount Lemmon Survey	·	650 m	MPC · JPL
855679	2011 FP_{165}	—	March 29, 2011	Mount Lemmon	Mount Lemmon Survey	·	700 m	MPC · JPL
855680	2011 FW_{165}	—	March 20, 2017	Haleakala	Pan-STARRS 1	THB	2.0 km	MPC · JPL
855681	2011 FY_{165}	—	December 6, 2015	Kitt Peak	Spacewatch	THB	2.6 km	MPC · JPL
855682	2011 FK_{166}	—	April 16, 2018	Haleakala	Pan-STARRS 1	·	520 m	MPC · JPL
855683	2011 FG_{167}	—	March 28, 2011	Mount Lemmon	Mount Lemmon Survey	(883)	480 m	MPC · JPL
855684	2011 FH_{167}	—	March 28, 2011	Mount Lemmon	Mount Lemmon Survey	·	470 m	MPC · JPL
855685	2011 FL_{167}	—	March 27, 2011	Mount Lemmon	Mount Lemmon Survey	·	620 m	MPC · JPL
855686	2011 FV_{169}	—	March 26, 2011	Mount Lemmon	Mount Lemmon Survey	·	470 m	MPC · JPL
855687	2011 FF_{170}	—	March 27, 2011	Kitt Peak	Spacewatch	·	490 m	MPC · JPL
855688	2011 FZ_{170}	—	March 28, 2011	Kitt Peak	Spacewatch	ADE	1.3 km	MPC · JPL
855689	2011 FC_{172}	—	March 25, 2011	Kitt Peak	Spacewatch	·	750 m	MPC · JPL
855690	2011 FO_{172}	—	March 30, 2011	Haleakala	Pan-STARRS 1	·	550 m	MPC · JPL
855691	2011 FT_{172}	—	March 29, 2011	Mount Lemmon	Mount Lemmon Survey	·	770 m	MPC · JPL
855692	2011 GP_{1}	—	April 1, 2011	Mount Lemmon	Mount Lemmon Survey	PHO	640 m	MPC · JPL
855693	2011 GX_{3}	—	September 6, 2008	Kitt Peak	Spacewatch	·	1.0 km	MPC · JPL
855694	2011 GM_{9}	—	March 29, 2011	Catalina	CSS	THB	2.4 km	MPC · JPL
855695	2011 GP_{9}	—	March 2, 2011	Kitt Peak	Spacewatch	H	470 m	MPC · JPL
855696	2011 GB_{12}	—	March 11, 2011	Mount Lemmon	Mount Lemmon Survey	·	470 m	MPC · JPL
855697	2011 GO_{13}	—	April 1, 2011	Mount Lemmon	Mount Lemmon Survey	·	1.6 km	MPC · JPL
855698	2011 GS_{15}	—	April 1, 2011	Mount Lemmon	Mount Lemmon Survey	H	350 m	MPC · JPL
855699	2011 GB_{16}	—	April 18, 2007	Kitt Peak	Spacewatch	·	1.1 km	MPC · JPL
855700	2011 GF_{20}	—	April 2, 2011	Mount Lemmon	Mount Lemmon Survey	·	1.0 km	MPC · JPL

== 855701–855800 ==
back to top

Designation			Discovery			Properties		Ref
Permanent	Provisional	Named after	Date	Site	Discoverer(s)	Category	Diam.	Ref
855701	2011 GA_{22}	—	October 20, 2006	Mount Lemmon	Mount Lemmon Survey	·	590 m	MPC · JPL
855702	2011 GA_{25}	—	April 4, 2011	Mount Lemmon	Mount Lemmon Survey	·	890 m	MPC · JPL
855703	2011 GM_{25}	—	September 11, 2007	Mount Lemmon	Mount Lemmon Survey	·	2.0 km	MPC · JPL
855704	2011 GQ_{25}	—	April 4, 2011	Mount Lemmon	Mount Lemmon Survey	·	960 m	MPC · JPL
855705	2011 GU_{25}	—	April 4, 2011	Mount Lemmon	Mount Lemmon Survey	HNS	690 m	MPC · JPL
855706	2011 GF_{26}	—	April 4, 2011	Mount Lemmon	Mount Lemmon Survey	·	600 m	MPC · JPL
855707	2011 GN_{29}	—	March 11, 2011	Kitt Peak	Spacewatch	(895)	2.5 km	MPC · JPL
855708	2011 GU_{30}	—	April 1, 2011	Kitt Peak	Spacewatch	NYS	800 m	MPC · JPL
855709	2011 GB_{33}	—	March 25, 2011	Kitt Peak	Spacewatch	·	700 m	MPC · JPL
855710	2011 GM_{33}	—	March 11, 2011	Mount Lemmon	Mount Lemmon Survey	·	1.1 km	MPC · JPL
855711	2011 GP_{53}	—	April 5, 2011	Mount Lemmon	Mount Lemmon Survey	·	830 m	MPC · JPL
855712	2011 GK_{57}	—	March 27, 2011	Kitt Peak	Spacewatch	·	560 m	MPC · JPL
855713	2011 GM_{58}	—	April 4, 2011	Kitt Peak	Spacewatch	NYS	870 m	MPC · JPL
855714	2011 GJ_{62}	—	February 2, 2008	Catalina	CSS	·	590 m	MPC · JPL
855715	2011 GD_{71}	—	April 13, 2011	Haleakala	Pan-STARRS 1	PHO	680 m	MPC · JPL
855716	2011 GX_{74}	—	April 13, 2011	Haleakala	Pan-STARRS 1	ADE	1.4 km	MPC · JPL
855717	2011 GG_{81}	—	April 7, 2011	Kitt Peak	Spacewatch	·	500 m	MPC · JPL
855718	2011 GT_{83}	—	March 27, 2011	Mount Lemmon	Mount Lemmon Survey	·	1.1 km	MPC · JPL
855719	2011 GT_{85}	—	April 1, 2011	Kitt Peak	Spacewatch	·	520 m	MPC · JPL
855720	2011 GL_{86}	—	February 10, 2011	Mount Lemmon	Mount Lemmon Survey	·	1.8 km	MPC · JPL
855721	2011 GC_{93}	—	March 31, 2011	Kitt Peak	Spacewatch	·	1.3 km	MPC · JPL
855722	2011 GQ_{93}	—	September 18, 2012	Mount Lemmon	Mount Lemmon Survey	·	1.1 km	MPC · JPL
855723	2011 GC_{95}	—	April 3, 2011	Haleakala	Pan-STARRS 1	·	700 m	MPC · JPL
855724	2011 GT_{96}	—	April 3, 2011	Haleakala	Pan-STARRS 1	HNS	670 m	MPC · JPL
855725	2011 GP_{98}	—	January 17, 2016	Haleakala	Pan-STARRS 1	·	2.4 km	MPC · JPL
855726	2011 GQ_{98}	—	August 26, 2012	Haleakala	Pan-STARRS 1	V	420 m	MPC · JPL
855727	2011 GT_{98}	—	April 12, 2018	Haleakala	Pan-STARRS 1	·	510 m	MPC · JPL
855728	2011 GY_{98}	—	April 6, 2011	Mount Lemmon	Mount Lemmon Survey	·	470 m	MPC · JPL
855729	2011 GE_{100}	—	April 3, 2011	Haleakala	Pan-STARRS 1	·	2.0 km	MPC · JPL
855730	2011 GE_{101}	—	April 13, 2011	Kitt Peak	Spacewatch	·	830 m	MPC · JPL
855731	2011 GN_{101}	—	April 6, 2011	Kitt Peak	Spacewatch	·	500 m	MPC · JPL
855732	2011 GX_{101}	—	April 3, 2011	Haleakala	Pan-STARRS 1	·	1.1 km	MPC · JPL
855733	2011 GV_{103}	—	April 2, 2011	Kitt Peak	Spacewatch	·	510 m	MPC · JPL
855734	2011 GB_{104}	—	April 4, 2011	Mount Lemmon	Mount Lemmon Survey	·	570 m	MPC · JPL
855735	2011 GE_{104}	—	April 4, 2011	Catalina	CSS	·	760 m	MPC · JPL
855736	2011 GH_{105}	—	April 6, 2011	Mount Lemmon	Mount Lemmon Survey	·	950 m	MPC · JPL
855737	2011 GY_{105}	—	April 3, 2011	Haleakala	Pan-STARRS 1	·	930 m	MPC · JPL
855738	2011 GZ_{105}	—	April 1, 2011	Mount Lemmon	Mount Lemmon Survey	·	850 m	MPC · JPL
855739	2011 GH_{106}	—	April 5, 2011	Kitt Peak	Spacewatch	HNS	770 m	MPC · JPL
855740	2011 GM_{106}	—	April 11, 2011	Mount Lemmon	Mount Lemmon Survey	·	1.3 km	MPC · JPL
855741	2011 GZ_{106}	—	April 13, 2011	Mount Lemmon	Mount Lemmon Survey	·	940 m	MPC · JPL
855742	2011 GK_{107}	—	April 2, 2011	Haleakala	Pan-STARRS 1	·	1.1 km	MPC · JPL
855743	2011 GJ_{108}	—	April 12, 2011	Mount Lemmon	Mount Lemmon Survey	·	770 m	MPC · JPL
855744	2011 GH_{109}	—	April 1, 2011	Mount Lemmon	Mount Lemmon Survey	·	1.1 km	MPC · JPL
855745	2011 GK_{109}	—	April 3, 2011	Haleakala	Pan-STARRS 1	·	880 m	MPC · JPL
855746	2011 GY_{109}	—	April 1, 2011	Mount Lemmon	Mount Lemmon Survey	·	710 m	MPC · JPL
855747	2011 GK_{110}	—	April 1, 2011	Kitt Peak	Spacewatch	·	1.0 km	MPC · JPL
855748	2011 GP_{110}	—	April 5, 2011	Mount Lemmon	Mount Lemmon Survey	·	890 m	MPC · JPL
855749	2011 HC	—	April 22, 2011	Modra	Gajdoš, S., Világi, J.	T_{j} (2.99) · EUP	2.5 km	MPC · JPL
855750	2011 HL	—	April 23, 2011	Haleakala	Pan-STARRS 1	H	300 m	MPC · JPL
855751	2011 HN	—	April 23, 2011	Haleakala	Pan-STARRS 1	H	350 m	MPC · JPL
855752	2011 HC_{1}	—	April 24, 2011	Mount Lemmon	Mount Lemmon Survey	H	360 m	MPC · JPL
855753	2011 HT_{1}	—	April 6, 2011	Mount Lemmon	Mount Lemmon Survey	·	1.2 km	MPC · JPL
855754	2011 HK_{5}	—	April 26, 2011	Mount Lemmon	Mount Lemmon Survey	·	460 m	MPC · JPL
855755	2011 HX_{6}	—	April 24, 2011	Kitt Peak	Spacewatch	·	1.1 km	MPC · JPL
855756	2011 HR_{7}	—	March 14, 2011	Mount Lemmon	Mount Lemmon Survey	·	2.0 km	MPC · JPL
855757	2011 HA_{10}	—	March 25, 2011	Kitt Peak	Spacewatch	H	440 m	MPC · JPL
855758	2011 HB_{10}	—	April 6, 2011	Mount Lemmon	Mount Lemmon Survey	·	1.9 km	MPC · JPL
855759	2011 HU_{10}	—	February 25, 2011	Mount Lemmon	Mount Lemmon Survey	·	2.3 km	MPC · JPL
855760	2011 HX_{12}	—	April 23, 2011	Kitt Peak	Spacewatch	JUN	750 m	MPC · JPL
855761	2011 HE_{14}	—	March 1, 2011	Mount Lemmon	Mount Lemmon Survey	ADE	1.4 km	MPC · JPL
855762	2011 HM_{14}	—	April 7, 2011	Kitt Peak	Spacewatch	·	520 m	MPC · JPL
855763	2011 HT_{17}	—	September 13, 2007	Mount Lemmon	Mount Lemmon Survey	·	2.3 km	MPC · JPL
855764	2011 HF_{21}	—	April 27, 2011	Mount Lemmon	Mount Lemmon Survey	EOS	1.4 km	MPC · JPL
855765	2011 HK_{21}	—	April 27, 2011	Mount Lemmon	Mount Lemmon Survey	·	1.1 km	MPC · JPL
855766	2011 HO_{21}	—	April 27, 2011	Kitt Peak	Spacewatch	·	2.3 km	MPC · JPL
855767	2011 HT_{21}	—	April 7, 2011	Kitt Peak	Spacewatch	·	1.2 km	MPC · JPL
855768	2011 HC_{23}	—	April 13, 2011	Kitt Peak	Spacewatch	(883)	490 m	MPC · JPL
855769	2011 HM_{23}	—	April 4, 2011	Kitt Peak	Spacewatch	PHO	700 m	MPC · JPL
855770	2011 HH_{35}	—	April 23, 2011	Haleakala	Pan-STARRS 1	(194)	1.2 km	MPC · JPL
855771	2011 HN_{40}	—	April 26, 2011	Mount Lemmon	Mount Lemmon Survey	EOS	1.3 km	MPC · JPL
855772	2011 HH_{43}	—	April 6, 2011	Mount Lemmon	Mount Lemmon Survey	·	1.1 km	MPC · JPL
855773	2011 HR_{43}	—	April 23, 2011	Kitt Peak	Spacewatch	·	2.5 km	MPC · JPL
855774	2011 HY_{53}	—	April 21, 2011	Haleakala	Pan-STARRS 1	·	1.2 km	MPC · JPL
855775	2011 HY_{56}	—	April 28, 2011	Kitt Peak	Spacewatch	·	1.8 km	MPC · JPL
855776	2011 HU_{61}	—	April 28, 2011	Haleakala	Pan-STARRS 1	H	340 m	MPC · JPL
855777	2011 HJ_{62}	—	April 30, 2011	Haleakala	Pan-STARRS 1	PHO	790 m	MPC · JPL
855778	2011 HA_{64}	—	March 10, 2005	Kitt Peak	Spacewatch	·	2.4 km	MPC · JPL
855779	2011 HK_{70}	—	March 13, 2011	Mount Lemmon	Mount Lemmon Survey	·	460 m	MPC · JPL
855780	2011 HB_{74}	—	April 27, 2011	Mount Lemmon	Mount Lemmon Survey	·	2.3 km	MPC · JPL
855781	2011 HJ_{91}	—	April 23, 2011	Haleakala	Pan-STARRS 1	·	600 m	MPC · JPL
855782	2011 HU_{93}	—	April 26, 2011	Mount Lemmon	Mount Lemmon Survey	·	1 km	MPC · JPL
855783	2011 HY_{95}	—	April 28, 2011	Kitt Peak	Spacewatch	·	2.1 km	MPC · JPL
855784	2011 HC_{96}	—	April 28, 2011	Kitt Peak	Spacewatch	·	1.2 km	MPC · JPL
855785	2011 HW_{96}	—	April 28, 2011	Mount Lemmon	Mount Lemmon Survey	·	1.9 km	MPC · JPL
855786	2011 HO_{97}	—	April 3, 2011	Haleakala	Pan-STARRS 1	·	1.2 km	MPC · JPL
855787	2011 HD_{101}	—	April 29, 2011	Mount Lemmon	Mount Lemmon Survey	H	330 m	MPC · JPL
855788	2011 HZ_{101}	—	October 18, 2007	Mount Lemmon	Mount Lemmon Survey	·	2.4 km	MPC · JPL
855789	2011 HH_{104}	—	April 26, 2011	Kitt Peak	Spacewatch	·	820 m	MPC · JPL
855790	2011 HE_{105}	—	February 23, 2015	Haleakala	Pan-STARRS 1	·	920 m	MPC · JPL
855791	2011 HE_{106}	—	April 26, 2011	Mount Lemmon	Mount Lemmon Survey	TIR	1.9 km	MPC · JPL
855792	2011 HP_{106}	—	April 28, 2011	Kitt Peak	Spacewatch	·	470 m	MPC · JPL
855793	2011 HM_{107}	—	December 29, 2014	Haleakala	Pan-STARRS 1	·	1.3 km	MPC · JPL
855794	2011 HX_{107}	—	August 8, 2018	Haleakala	Pan-STARRS 1	EOS	1.4 km	MPC · JPL
855795	2011 HA_{108}	—	June 15, 2018	Haleakala	Pan-STARRS 1	·	2.2 km	MPC · JPL
855796	2011 HS_{108}	—	January 22, 2015	Haleakala	Pan-STARRS 1	·	1.1 km	MPC · JPL
855797	2011 HC_{109}	—	October 9, 2012	Haleakala	Pan-STARRS 1	V	470 m	MPC · JPL
855798	2011 HL_{109}	—	April 26, 2011	Mount Lemmon	Mount Lemmon Survey	·	2.4 km	MPC · JPL
855799	2011 HP_{110}	—	April 26, 2011	Mount Lemmon	Mount Lemmon Survey	·	720 m	MPC · JPL
855800	2011 HQ_{110}	—	April 22, 2011	Kitt Peak	Spacewatch	·	840 m	MPC · JPL

== 855801–855900 ==
back to top

Designation			Discovery			Properties		Ref
Permanent	Provisional	Named after	Date	Site	Discoverer(s)	Category	Diam.	Ref
855801	2011 HL_{111}	—	April 21, 2011	Haleakala	Pan-STARRS 1	·	580 m	MPC · JPL
855802	2011 HW_{111}	—	April 27, 2011	Mount Lemmon	Mount Lemmon Survey	·	2.4 km	MPC · JPL
855803	2011 HV_{112}	—	April 27, 2011	Mount Lemmon	Mount Lemmon Survey	·	2.5 km	MPC · JPL
855804	2011 JG_{15}	—	May 11, 2011	Kachina	Hobart, J.	H	350 m	MPC · JPL
855805	2011 JU_{19}	—	May 1, 2011	Haleakala	Pan-STARRS 1	·	2.1 km	MPC · JPL
855806	2011 JA_{20}	—	March 29, 2011	Kitt Peak	Spacewatch	·	550 m	MPC · JPL
855807	2011 JH_{21}	—	April 28, 2011	Kitt Peak	Spacewatch	·	940 m	MPC · JPL
855808	2011 JR_{23}	—	May 1, 2011	Haleakala	Pan-STARRS 1	·	540 m	MPC · JPL
855809	2011 JE_{24}	—	September 22, 2003	Kitt Peak	Spacewatch	EUN	780 m	MPC · JPL
855810	2011 JM_{25}	—	March 27, 2011	Mount Lemmon	Mount Lemmon Survey	·	730 m	MPC · JPL
855811	2011 JC_{29}	—	April 30, 2011	Kitt Peak	Spacewatch	PHO	1.8 km	MPC · JPL
855812	2011 JW_{29}	—	May 5, 2011	Mount Lemmon	Mount Lemmon Survey	EUN	840 m	MPC · JPL
855813	2011 JC_{30}	—	May 13, 2011	Mount Lemmon	Mount Lemmon Survey	·	570 m	MPC · JPL
855814	2011 JD_{34}	—	April 24, 2015	Haleakala	Pan-STARRS 1	·	1.3 km	MPC · JPL
855815	2011 JN_{34}	—	May 12, 2011	Mount Lemmon	Mount Lemmon Survey	NYS	690 m	MPC · JPL
855816	2011 JN_{35}	—	October 17, 2012	Haleakala	Pan-STARRS 1	V	460 m	MPC · JPL
855817	2011 JX_{35}	—	April 25, 2015	Haleakala	Pan-STARRS 1	·	640 m	MPC · JPL
855818	2011 JY_{35}	—	May 8, 2011	Kitt Peak	Spacewatch	·	2.5 km	MPC · JPL
855819	2011 JQ_{36}	—	May 6, 2011	Kitt Peak	Spacewatch	·	840 m	MPC · JPL
855820	2011 JG_{38}	—	May 9, 2011	Mount Lemmon	Mount Lemmon Survey	·	800 m	MPC · JPL
855821	2011 JK_{38}	—	May 7, 2011	Kitt Peak	Spacewatch	·	490 m	MPC · JPL
855822	2011 JA_{39}	—	May 7, 2011	Kitt Peak	Spacewatch	·	1.2 km	MPC · JPL
855823	2011 JE_{39}	—	May 1, 2011	Haleakala	Pan-STARRS 1	·	1.2 km	MPC · JPL
855824	2011 JT_{39}	—	May 13, 2011	Mount Lemmon	Mount Lemmon Survey	·	480 m	MPC · JPL
855825	2011 KM_{13}	—	May 23, 2011	Nogales	M. Schwartz, P. R. Holvorcem	H	440 m	MPC · JPL
855826	2011 KQ_{14}	—	May 23, 2011	Kitt Peak	Spacewatch	PHO	580 m	MPC · JPL
855827	2011 KM_{15}	—	May 26, 2011	Catalina	CSS	·	1.3 km	MPC · JPL
855828	2011 KR_{16}	—	May 28, 2011	Mount Lemmon	Mount Lemmon Survey	H	380 m	MPC · JPL
855829	2011 KR_{19}	—	October 19, 2006	Kitt Peak	Spacewatch	T_{j} (2.95)	2.3 km	MPC · JPL
855830	2011 KD_{22}	—	May 30, 2011	Haleakala	Pan-STARRS 1	·	1.1 km	MPC · JPL
855831	2011 KQ_{24}	—	May 21, 2011	Mount Lemmon	Mount Lemmon Survey	·	2.1 km	MPC · JPL
855832	2011 KY_{27}	—	May 24, 2011	Mount Lemmon	Mount Lemmon Survey	·	1.2 km	MPC · JPL
855833	2011 KB_{30}	—	May 22, 2011	Mount Lemmon	Mount Lemmon Survey	·	960 m	MPC · JPL
855834	2011 KO_{34}	—	May 23, 2011	Mount Lemmon	Mount Lemmon Survey	ERI	1.1 km	MPC · JPL
855835	2011 KX_{35}	—	May 31, 2011	Mount Lemmon	Mount Lemmon Survey	ADE	1.3 km	MPC · JPL
855836	2011 KO_{38}	—	May 23, 2011	Mount Lemmon	Mount Lemmon Survey	·	910 m	MPC · JPL
855837	2011 KD_{41}	—	May 24, 2011	Haleakala	Pan-STARRS 1	V	490 m	MPC · JPL
855838	2011 KH_{50}	—	May 22, 2011	Mount Lemmon	Mount Lemmon Survey	·	1.3 km	MPC · JPL
855839	2011 KX_{50}	—	February 18, 2015	Kitt Peak	Research and Education Collaborative Occultation Network	PAD	1.2 km	MPC · JPL
855840	2011 KY_{50}	—	May 23, 2011	Mount Lemmon	Mount Lemmon Survey	H	410 m	MPC · JPL
855841	2011 KA_{53}	—	May 21, 2011	Kitt Peak	Spacewatch	·	560 m	MPC · JPL
855842	2011 KC_{53}	—	May 21, 2011	Mount Lemmon	Mount Lemmon Survey	·	960 m	MPC · JPL
855843	2011 KT_{53}	—	October 6, 2012	Haleakala	Pan-STARRS 1	·	860 m	MPC · JPL
855844	2011 KP_{54}	—	June 29, 2015	Haleakala	Pan-STARRS 1	·	950 m	MPC · JPL
855845	2011 KK_{55}	—	May 22, 2011	Mount Lemmon	Mount Lemmon Survey	·	520 m	MPC · JPL
855846	2011 KE_{56}	—	May 26, 2011	Mount Lemmon	Mount Lemmon Survey	·	1.3 km	MPC · JPL
855847	2011 KF_{58}	—	May 24, 2011	Mount Lemmon	Mount Lemmon Survey	·	670 m	MPC · JPL
855848	2011 KK_{59}	—	May 28, 2011	Mount Lemmon	Mount Lemmon Survey	H	460 m	MPC · JPL
855849	2011 KG_{60}	—	May 23, 2011	Mount Lemmon	Mount Lemmon Survey	·	540 m	MPC · JPL
855850	2011 KZ_{60}	—	May 29, 2011	Mount Lemmon	Mount Lemmon Survey	·	1.1 km	MPC · JPL
855851	2011 LB_{1}	—	August 1, 2008	La Sagra	OAM	·	420 m	MPC · JPL
855852	2011 LO_{2}	—	June 3, 2011	Nogales	M. Schwartz, P. R. Holvorcem	H	360 m	MPC · JPL
855853	2011 LS_{2}	—	June 3, 2011	Mount Lemmon	Mount Lemmon Survey	·	900 m	MPC · JPL
855854	2011 LW_{2}	—	June 4, 2011	Mount Lemmon	Mount Lemmon Survey	H	460 m	MPC · JPL
855855	2011 LN_{6}	—	May 30, 2011	Haleakala	Pan-STARRS 1	·	890 m	MPC · JPL
855856	2011 LJ_{9}	—	June 5, 2011	Mount Lemmon	Mount Lemmon Survey	·	1.3 km	MPC · JPL
855857	2011 LQ_{9}	—	May 31, 2011	ESA OGS	ESA OGS	·	950 m	MPC · JPL
855858	2011 LT_{9}	—	June 6, 2011	Haleakala	Pan-STARRS 1	·	510 m	MPC · JPL
855859	2011 LZ_{9}	—	February 21, 2007	Mount Lemmon	Mount Lemmon Survey	NYS	740 m	MPC · JPL
855860	2011 LL_{16}	—	June 2, 2011	Haleakala	Pan-STARRS 1	·	1.4 km	MPC · JPL
855861	2011 LN_{25}	—	June 7, 2011	Haleakala	Pan-STARRS 1	EUN	950 m	MPC · JPL
855862	2011 LC_{30}	—	October 21, 2012	Haleakala	Pan-STARRS 1	·	1.3 km	MPC · JPL
855863	2011 LC_{31}	—	June 4, 2011	Cerro Tololo	EURONEAR	EOS	1.4 km	MPC · JPL
855864	2011 LV_{32}	—	April 12, 2015	Haleakala	Pan-STARRS 1	·	980 m	MPC · JPL
855865	2011 LX_{32}	—	June 11, 2011	Mount Lemmon	Mount Lemmon Survey	·	540 m	MPC · JPL
855866	2011 LA_{33}	—	June 6, 2011	Haleakala	Pan-STARRS 1	·	500 m	MPC · JPL
855867	2011 LK_{33}	—	January 16, 2018	Haleakala	Pan-STARRS 1	·	900 m	MPC · JPL
855868	2011 LP_{34}	—	June 6, 2011	Haleakala	Pan-STARRS 1	EUN	930 m	MPC · JPL
855869	2011 LJ_{35}	—	June 12, 2011	Mount Lemmon	Mount Lemmon Survey	H	430 m	MPC · JPL
855870	2011 LS_{35}	—	June 5, 2011	Kitt Peak	Spacewatch	·	940 m	MPC · JPL
855871	2011 LU_{35}	—	June 6, 2011	Mount Lemmon	Mount Lemmon Survey	·	460 m	MPC · JPL
855872	2011 LV_{35}	—	June 7, 2011	Mount Lemmon	Mount Lemmon Survey	·	540 m	MPC · JPL
855873	2011 LK_{36}	—	June 10, 2011	Mount Lemmon	Mount Lemmon Survey	·	1.2 km	MPC · JPL
855874	2011 LS_{36}	—	June 3, 2011	Mount Lemmon	Mount Lemmon Survey	·	2.1 km	MPC · JPL
855875	2011 LV_{36}	—	June 6, 2011	Mount Lemmon	Mount Lemmon Survey	T_{j} (2.86)	2.6 km	MPC · JPL
855876	2011 LS_{37}	—	June 3, 2011	Mount Lemmon	Mount Lemmon Survey	·	1.3 km	MPC · JPL
855877	2011 MF_{2}	—	June 22, 2011	Kitt Peak	Spacewatch	·	740 m	MPC · JPL
855878	2011 MS_{3}	—	June 29, 2011	Socorro	LINEAR	·	1.2 km	MPC · JPL
855879	2011 ML_{12}	—	March 19, 2015	Haleakala	Pan-STARRS 1	·	2.0 km	MPC · JPL
855880	2011 MP_{12}	—	June 25, 2011	Mount Lemmon	Mount Lemmon Survey	BRA	1.2 km	MPC · JPL
855881	2011 MQ_{12}	—	June 26, 2011	Mount Lemmon	Mount Lemmon Survey	·	1.0 km	MPC · JPL
855882	2011 MU_{12}	—	June 28, 2011	Mount Lemmon	Mount Lemmon Survey	·	1.6 km	MPC · JPL
855883	2011 MK_{13}	—	January 20, 2015	Haleakala	Pan-STARRS 1	·	2.7 km	MPC · JPL
855884	2011 MK_{14}	—	June 25, 2011	Mount Lemmon	Mount Lemmon Survey	(1547)	1.2 km	MPC · JPL
855885	2011 MO_{14}	—	June 22, 2011	Nogales	M. Schwartz, P. R. Holvorcem	·	1.3 km	MPC · JPL
855886	2011 MU_{14}	—	June 22, 2011	Mount Lemmon	Mount Lemmon Survey	MAS	530 m	MPC · JPL
855887	2011 MX_{14}	—	June 27, 2011	Kitt Peak	Spacewatch	(5)	900 m	MPC · JPL
855888	2011 MP_{15}	—	June 26, 2011	Mount Lemmon	Mount Lemmon Survey	·	650 m	MPC · JPL
855889	2011 MR_{15}	—	June 26, 2011	Mount Lemmon	Mount Lemmon Survey	·	1.8 km	MPC · JPL
855890	2011 MT_{15}	—	June 24, 2011	Mount Lemmon	Mount Lemmon Survey	·	760 m	MPC · JPL
855891	2011 MU_{15}	—	June 27, 2011	Mount Lemmon	Mount Lemmon Survey	·	1.2 km	MPC · JPL
855892	2011 MZ_{15}	—	July 4, 2016	Haleakala	Pan-STARRS 1	·	1.5 km	MPC · JPL
855893	2011 MS_{16}	—	September 8, 2011	Kitt Peak	Spacewatch	·	670 m	MPC · JPL
855894	2011 NW	—	October 18, 2007	Kitt Peak	Spacewatch	AEO	660 m	MPC · JPL
855895	2011 NV_{4}	—	September 3, 2014	Mount Lemmon	Mount Lemmon Survey	H	330 m	MPC · JPL
855896	2011 ND_{5}	—	July 2, 2011	Siding Spring	SSS	T_{j} (2.91)	2.7 km	MPC · JPL
855897	2011 NA_{7}	—	July 1, 2011	Mount Lemmon	Mount Lemmon Survey	L5	6.5 km	MPC · JPL
855898	2011 OK_{3}	—	June 23, 2011	Kitt Peak	Spacewatch	·	500 m	MPC · JPL
855899	2011 OO_{3}	—	June 12, 2011	Mount Lemmon	Mount Lemmon Survey	·	1.3 km	MPC · JPL
855900	2011 OS_{3}	—	August 19, 2002	Palomar Mountain	NEAT	·	1.3 km	MPC · JPL

== 855901–856000 ==
back to top

Designation			Discovery			Properties		Ref
Permanent	Provisional	Named after	Date	Site	Discoverer(s)	Category	Diam.	Ref
855901	2011 OO_{4}	—	July 25, 2011	Haleakala	Pan-STARRS 1	·	1.5 km	MPC · JPL
855902	2011 OW_{5}	—	July 24, 2011	Haleakala	Pan-STARRS 1	·	1.2 km	MPC · JPL
855903	2011 OE_{6}	—	July 25, 2011	Haleakala	Pan-STARRS 1	PHO	510 m	MPC · JPL
855904	2011 OL_{7}	—	July 26, 2011	Haleakala	Pan-STARRS 1	·	1.6 km	MPC · JPL
855905	2011 ON_{7}	—	July 26, 2011	Haleakala	Pan-STARRS 1	V	490 m	MPC · JPL
855906	2011 OT_{7}	—	July 26, 2011	Haleakala	Pan-STARRS 1	·	550 m	MPC · JPL
855907	2011 OH_{8}	—	July 26, 2011	Haleakala	Pan-STARRS 1	NYS	770 m	MPC · JPL
855908	2011 OS_{8}	—	July 27, 2011	Haleakala	Pan-STARRS 1	·	1.1 km	MPC · JPL
855909	2011 OJ_{9}	—	July 27, 2011	Haleakala	Pan-STARRS 1	·	1.5 km	MPC · JPL
855910	2011 OM_{9}	—	July 27, 2011	Haleakala	Pan-STARRS 1	·	1.3 km	MPC · JPL
855911	2011 OD_{10}	—	July 27, 2011	Haleakala	Pan-STARRS 1	·	1.1 km	MPC · JPL
855912	2011 OC_{12}	—	July 25, 2011	Haleakala	Pan-STARRS 1	·	500 m	MPC · JPL
855913	2011 OA_{13}	—	June 27, 2011	Kitt Peak	Spacewatch	·	520 m	MPC · JPL
855914	2011 OU_{13}	—	July 25, 2011	Haleakala	Pan-STARRS 1	BAP	570 m	MPC · JPL
855915	2011 OX_{18}	—	October 6, 2008	Kitt Peak	Spacewatch	·	450 m	MPC · JPL
855916	2011 OT_{20}	—	June 28, 2011	Mount Lemmon	Mount Lemmon Survey	·	1.0 km	MPC · JPL
855917	2011 OM_{24}	—	September 7, 2008	Mount Lemmon	Mount Lemmon Survey	·	410 m	MPC · JPL
855918	2011 OR_{26}	—	July 2, 2011	Mount Lemmon	Mount Lemmon Survey	·	1.5 km	MPC · JPL
855919	2011 OM_{27}	—	November 1, 2008	Mount Lemmon	Mount Lemmon Survey	·	510 m	MPC · JPL
855920	2011 OC_{29}	—	July 28, 2011	Siding Spring	SSS	·	1.5 km	MPC · JPL
855921	2011 OB_{30}	—	July 28, 2011	Haleakala	Pan-STARRS 1	EUN	850 m	MPC · JPL
855922	2011 OO_{30}	—	April 20, 2007	Mount Lemmon	Mount Lemmon Survey	NYS	960 m	MPC · JPL
855923	2011 OF_{32}	—	July 26, 2011	Haleakala	Pan-STARRS 1	·	480 m	MPC · JPL
855924	2011 OO_{34}	—	July 28, 2011	Haleakala	Pan-STARRS 1	·	420 m	MPC · JPL
855925	2011 OH_{39}	—	June 22, 2011	Mount Lemmon	Mount Lemmon Survey	MAS	480 m	MPC · JPL
855926	2011 OV_{39}	—	July 28, 2011	Haleakala	Pan-STARRS 1	V	380 m	MPC · JPL
855927	2011 OY_{40}	—	June 11, 2011	Mount Lemmon	Mount Lemmon Survey	·	430 m	MPC · JPL
855928	2011 OV_{42}	—	September 12, 2007	Mount Lemmon	Mount Lemmon Survey	·	950 m	MPC · JPL
855929	2011 OK_{43}	—	November 4, 2007	Catalina	CSS	·	1.3 km	MPC · JPL
855930	2011 OZ_{43}	—	July 27, 2011	Haleakala	Pan-STARRS 1	NYS	920 m	MPC · JPL
855931	2011 OA_{46}	—	July 28, 2011	Haleakala	Pan-STARRS 1	·	520 m	MPC · JPL
855932	2011 OB_{48}	—	June 25, 2011	Mount Lemmon	Mount Lemmon Survey	DOR	1.6 km	MPC · JPL
855933	2011 OF_{48}	—	June 5, 2011	Mount Lemmon	Mount Lemmon Survey	·	1.8 km	MPC · JPL
855934	2011 OB_{50}	—	July 31, 2011	Haleakala	Pan-STARRS 1	MAS	520 m	MPC · JPL
855935	2011 OA_{52}	—	July 1, 2011	Mount Lemmon	Mount Lemmon Survey	EUN	880 m	MPC · JPL
855936	2011 OY_{54}	—	July 1, 2011	Mount Lemmon	Mount Lemmon Survey	·	1.6 km	MPC · JPL
855937	2011 OH_{57}	—	June 27, 2011	Mount Lemmon	Mount Lemmon Survey	·	370 m	MPC · JPL
855938	2011 OP_{58}	—	July 26, 2011	Haleakala	Pan-STARRS 1	BAR	1.0 km	MPC · JPL
855939	2011 OZ_{61}	—	July 26, 2011	Haleakala	Pan-STARRS 1	·	2.2 km	MPC · JPL
855940	2011 OM_{63}	—	May 8, 2014	Haleakala	Pan-STARRS 1	·	490 m	MPC · JPL
855941	2011 OS_{63}	—	July 28, 2011	Haleakala	Pan-STARRS 1	·	2.1 km	MPC · JPL
855942	2011 OH_{64}	—	June 30, 2017	Mount Lemmon	Mount Lemmon Survey	·	2.6 km	MPC · JPL
855943	2011 OJ_{64}	—	July 25, 2011	Haleakala	Pan-STARRS 1	·	1.5 km	MPC · JPL
855944	2011 OH_{65}	—	July 26, 2011	Haleakala	Pan-STARRS 1	·	480 m	MPC · JPL
855945	2011 OD_{66}	—	July 26, 2011	Haleakala	Pan-STARRS 1	NYS	730 m	MPC · JPL
855946	2011 OP_{67}	—	July 27, 2011	Haleakala	Pan-STARRS 1	·	470 m	MPC · JPL
855947	2011 OJ_{68}	—	July 23, 2015	Haleakala	Pan-STARRS 1	NYS	860 m	MPC · JPL
855948	2011 ON_{68}	—	July 26, 2011	Haleakala	Pan-STARRS 1	·	500 m	MPC · JPL
855949	2011 OZ_{68}	—	December 18, 2015	Mount Lemmon	Mount Lemmon Survey	·	430 m	MPC · JPL
855950	2011 ON_{69}	—	February 26, 2014	Haleakala	Pan-STARRS 1	NYS	760 m	MPC · JPL
855951	2011 OS_{69}	—	September 20, 2015	Catalina	CSS	ERI	1.3 km	MPC · JPL
855952	2011 OV_{69}	—	July 28, 2011	Haleakala	Pan-STARRS 1	V	390 m	MPC · JPL
855953	2011 OE_{70}	—	July 28, 2011	Haleakala	Pan-STARRS 1	·	850 m	MPC · JPL
855954	2011 OG_{71}	—	July 27, 2011	Haleakala	Pan-STARRS 1	NYS	690 m	MPC · JPL
855955	2011 OJ_{71}	—	October 7, 2008	Mount Lemmon	Mount Lemmon Survey	·	480 m	MPC · JPL
855956	2011 OO_{71}	—	June 12, 2011	Mount Lemmon	Mount Lemmon Survey	·	480 m	MPC · JPL
855957	2011 OC_{72}	—	July 27, 2011	Haleakala	Pan-STARRS 1	·	1.4 km	MPC · JPL
855958	2011 ON_{72}	—	July 26, 2011	Haleakala	Pan-STARRS 1	·	1.4 km	MPC · JPL
855959	2011 OB_{73}	—	July 28, 2011	Haleakala	Pan-STARRS 1	·	860 m	MPC · JPL
855960	2011 OX_{73}	—	July 28, 2011	Haleakala	Pan-STARRS 1	V	370 m	MPC · JPL
855961	2011 OF_{74}	—	July 27, 2011	Haleakala	Pan-STARRS 1	·	470 m	MPC · JPL
855962	2011 OU_{74}	—	July 26, 2011	Haleakala	Pan-STARRS 1	·	560 m	MPC · JPL
855963	2011 OB_{75}	—	July 28, 2011	Haleakala	Pan-STARRS 1	PHO	580 m	MPC · JPL
855964	2011 OR_{75}	—	July 27, 2011	Haleakala	Pan-STARRS 1	AEO	900 m	MPC · JPL
855965	2011 OK_{76}	—	July 28, 2011	Haleakala	Pan-STARRS 1	·	910 m	MPC · JPL
855966	2011 OJ_{77}	—	July 26, 2011	Haleakala	Pan-STARRS 1	V	370 m	MPC · JPL
855967	2011 OD_{78}	—	September 26, 2008	Kitt Peak	Spacewatch	·	510 m	MPC · JPL
855968	2011 OX_{78}	—	July 27, 2011	Haleakala	Pan-STARRS 1	L5	6.2 km	MPC · JPL
855969	2011 OB_{79}	—	July 25, 2011	Haleakala	Pan-STARRS 1	·	880 m	MPC · JPL
855970	2011 OJ_{79}	—	July 27, 2011	Haleakala	Pan-STARRS 1	·	1.6 km	MPC · JPL
855971	2011 PY	—	August 3, 2011	Haleakala	Pan-STARRS 1	·	930 m	MPC · JPL
855972	2011 PC_{3}	—	August 1, 2011	Haleakala	Pan-STARRS 1	·	630 m	MPC · JPL
855973	2011 PV_{6}	—	August 4, 2011	Haleakala	Pan-STARRS 1	·	560 m	MPC · JPL
855974	2011 PQ_{9}	—	July 25, 2011	Haleakala	Pan-STARRS 1	·	530 m	MPC · JPL
855975	2011 PU_{9}	—	July 26, 2011	Haleakala	Pan-STARRS 1	·	400 m	MPC · JPL
855976	2011 PX_{9}	—	July 25, 2011	Haleakala	Pan-STARRS 1	·	1.5 km	MPC · JPL
855977	2011 PL_{14}	—	August 6, 2011	Haleakala	Pan-STARRS 1	·	2.2 km	MPC · JPL
855978	2011 PY_{16}	—	August 2, 2011	Haleakala	Pan-STARRS 1	·	2.5 km	MPC · JPL
855979	2011 PJ_{17}	—	January 28, 2015	Haleakala	Pan-STARRS 1	EOS	1.7 km	MPC · JPL
855980	2011 PP_{17}	—	August 2, 2011	Haleakala	Pan-STARRS 1	·	2.8 km	MPC · JPL
855981	2011 PA_{18}	—	August 1, 2011	Siding Spring	SSS	H	470 m	MPC · JPL
855982	2011 PF_{18}	—	August 3, 2011	Haleakala	Pan-STARRS 1	·	890 m	MPC · JPL
855983	2011 PY_{19}	—	August 1, 2011	Haleakala	Pan-STARRS 1	(2076)	530 m	MPC · JPL
855984	2011 PO_{22}	—	August 3, 2011	Haleakala	Pan-STARRS 1	·	510 m	MPC · JPL
855985	2011 PR_{22}	—	August 6, 2011	Haleakala	Pan-STARRS 1	·	450 m	MPC · JPL
855986	2011 PY_{22}	—	August 1, 2011	Haleakala	Pan-STARRS 1	·	1.2 km	MPC · JPL
855987	2011 PA_{24}	—	August 1, 2011	Haleakala	Pan-STARRS 1	·	1.3 km	MPC · JPL
855988	2011 QL_{2}	—	August 19, 2011	Haleakala	Pan-STARRS 1	PHO	640 m	MPC · JPL
855989	2011 QK_{9}	—	November 1, 2002	Palomar	NEAT	·	1.2 km	MPC · JPL
855990	2011 QU_{10}	—	August 20, 2011	Haleakala	Pan-STARRS 1	·	1.9 km	MPC · JPL
855991	2011 QD_{11}	—	August 10, 2011	Haleakala	Pan-STARRS 1	·	850 m	MPC · JPL
855992	2011 QD_{12}	—	August 20, 2011	Haleakala	Pan-STARRS 1	·	590 m	MPC · JPL
855993	2011 QS_{14}	—	August 23, 2011	Haleakala	Pan-STARRS 1	·	1.5 km	MPC · JPL
855994	2011 QG_{20}	—	August 23, 2011	Haleakala	Pan-STARRS 1	·	1.5 km	MPC · JPL
855995	2011 QN_{20}	—	August 23, 2011	Haleakala	Pan-STARRS 1	·	1.3 km	MPC · JPL
855996	2011 QW_{20}	—	August 23, 2011	Haleakala	Pan-STARRS 1	·	740 m	MPC · JPL
855997	2011 QT_{22}	—	August 24, 2011	Zelenchukskaya	T. V. Krjačko, B. Satovski	·	2.3 km	MPC · JPL
855998	2011 QM_{25}	—	August 11, 2002	Palomar Mountain	NEAT	·	1.2 km	MPC · JPL
855999	2011 QJ_{29}	—	September 7, 2002	Socorro	LINEAR	·	1.5 km	MPC · JPL
856000	2011 QV_{29}	—	August 24, 2011	Haleakala	Pan-STARRS 1	JUN	760 m	MPC · JPL

back to top
