= List of minor planets: 881001–882000 =

The following is a partial list of minor planets, running from minor-planet number 881001 through 882000, inclusive. The primary data for this and other partial lists is based on JPL's "Small-Body Orbital Elements" and data available from the Minor Planet Center. Critical list information is also provided by the MPC, unless otherwise specified from Lowell Observatory. A detailed description of the table's columns and additional sources are given on the main page including a complete list of every page in this series, and a statistical break-up on the dynamical classification of minor planets.

Also see the summary list of all named bodies in numerical and alphabetical order, and the corresponding naming citations for the number range of this particular list. New namings may only be added to this list after official publication, as the preannouncement of names is condemned by the Working Group for Small Bodies Nomenclature of the International Astronomical Union.

Near-Earth obj.	MBA (inner)	MBA (outer)	Centaur
Mars-crosser	MBA (middle)	Jupiter trojan	Trans-Neptunian obj.
Unclassified

== 881001–881100 ==
Designation			Discovery			Properties		Ref
Permanent	Provisional	Named after	Date	Site	Discoverer(s)	Category	Diam.	Ref
881001	2015 BT_{296}	—	January 19, 2015	Haleakala	Pan-STARRS 1	·	870 m	MPC · JPL
881002	2015 BE_{299}	—	December 29, 2014	Haleakala	Pan-STARRS 1	PHO	720 m	MPC · JPL
881003	2015 BO_{305}	—	January 19, 2015	Haleakala	Pan-STARRS 1	·	2.1 km	MPC · JPL
881004	2015 BR_{308}	—	January 20, 2015	Mount Lemmon	Mount Lemmon Survey	·	2.0 km	MPC · JPL
881005	2015 BS_{309}	—	January 20, 2015	Mount Lemmon	Mount Lemmon Survey	LIX	2.4 km	MPC · JPL
881006	2015 BD_{328}	—	November 9, 2013	Kitt Peak	Spacewatch	·	2.3 km	MPC · JPL
881007	2015 BW_{333}	—	January 17, 2015	Haleakala	Pan-STARRS 1	EOS	1.5 km	MPC · JPL
881008	2015 BA_{343}	—	January 17, 2015	Haleakala	Pan-STARRS 1	·	2.8 km	MPC · JPL
881009	2015 BU_{348}	—	February 2, 2011	Piszkés-tető	K. Sárneczky, S. Kürti	BRG	930 m	MPC · JPL
881010	2015 BM_{351}	—	December 29, 2014	Haleakala	Pan-STARRS 1	·	2.1 km	MPC · JPL
881011	2015 BN_{356}	—	January 19, 2015	Kitt Peak	Spacewatch	V	460 m	MPC · JPL
881012	2015 BJ_{358}	—	January 20, 2015	Haleakala	Pan-STARRS 1	·	2.0 km	MPC · JPL
881013	2015 BW_{359}	—	January 20, 2015	Haleakala	Pan-STARRS 1	·	1.9 km	MPC · JPL
881014	2015 BD_{360}	—	December 26, 2014	Haleakala	Pan-STARRS 1	·	2.3 km	MPC · JPL
881015	2015 BK_{364}	—	January 20, 2015	Haleakala	Pan-STARRS 1	·	2.0 km	MPC · JPL
881016	2015 BP_{374}	—	December 26, 2014	Haleakala	Pan-STARRS 1	·	1.5 km	MPC · JPL
881017	2015 BW_{394}	—	January 20, 2015	Haleakala	Pan-STARRS 1	·	910 m	MPC · JPL
881018	2015 BC_{402}	—	January 20, 2015	Haleakala	Pan-STARRS 1	·	1.1 km	MPC · JPL
881019	2015 BU_{403}	—	January 20, 2015	Haleakala	Pan-STARRS 1	·	930 m	MPC · JPL
881020	2015 BA_{410}	—	November 11, 2013	Mount Lemmon	Mount Lemmon Survey	·	2.0 km	MPC · JPL
881021	2015 BC_{414}	—	January 20, 2015	Haleakala	Pan-STARRS 1	·	2.2 km	MPC · JPL
881022	2015 BD_{423}	—	January 26, 2009	Mount Lemmon	Mount Lemmon Survey	URS	2.0 km	MPC · JPL
881023	2015 BY_{431}	—	January 19, 2004	Kitt Peak	Spacewatch	·	2.2 km	MPC · JPL
881024	2015 BW_{433}	—	January 20, 2015	Haleakala	Pan-STARRS 1	T_{j} (2.98) · EUP	2.6 km	MPC · JPL
881025	2015 BN_{434}	—	August 27, 2006	Kitt Peak	Spacewatch	·	4.2 km	MPC · JPL
881026	2015 BW_{437}	—	January 20, 2015	Haleakala	Pan-STARRS 1	·	2.0 km	MPC · JPL
881027	2015 BW_{448}	—	January 20, 2015	Haleakala	Pan-STARRS 1	·	2.1 km	MPC · JPL
881028	2015 BT_{449}	—	January 20, 2015	Haleakala	Pan-STARRS 1	·	880 m	MPC · JPL
881029	2015 BB_{451}	—	January 20, 2015	Haleakala	Pan-STARRS 1	T_{j} (2.97)	2.1 km	MPC · JPL
881030	2015 BN_{456}	—	February 25, 2011	Mount Lemmon	Mount Lemmon Survey	·	720 m	MPC · JPL
881031	2015 BR_{457}	—	September 3, 2013	Mount Lemmon	Mount Lemmon Survey	MAS	610 m	MPC · JPL
881032	2015 BZ_{466}	—	October 10, 2013	Haleakala	Pan-STARRS 1	·	2.1 km	MPC · JPL
881033	2015 BO_{473}	—	January 20, 2015	Haleakala	Pan-STARRS 1	·	1.9 km	MPC · JPL
881034	2015 BS_{508}	—	January 21, 2015	Kitt Peak	Spacewatch	·	850 m	MPC · JPL
881035	2015 BA_{523}	—	April 21, 2004	Kitt Peak	Spacewatch	·	690 m	MPC · JPL
881036	2015 BY_{523}	—	January 16, 2015	Mauna Kea	Hasinger, G.	·	520 m	MPC · JPL
881037	2015 BW_{525}	—	January 19, 2015	Mauna Kea	Hasinger, G.	·	860 m	MPC · JPL
881038	2015 BY_{528}	—	January 16, 2015	Haleakala	Pan-STARRS 1	·	1.9 km	MPC · JPL
881039	2015 BL_{529}	—	November 26, 2014	Haleakala	Pan-STARRS 1	·	2.0 km	MPC · JPL
881040	2015 BN_{529}	—	January 18, 2015	Haleakala	Pan-STARRS 1	·	1.8 km	MPC · JPL
881041	2015 BY_{532}	—	January 27, 2015	Haleakala	Pan-STARRS 1	·	1.7 km	MPC · JPL
881042	2015 BU_{534}	—	March 11, 2005	Mount Lemmon	Mount Lemmon Survey	·	1.8 km	MPC · JPL
881043	2015 BT_{538}	—	September 13, 2007	Mount Lemmon	Mount Lemmon Survey	·	1.9 km	MPC · JPL
881044	2015 BX_{539}	—	January 22, 2015	Haleakala	Pan-STARRS 1	ELF	2.3 km	MPC · JPL
881045	2015 BL_{543}	—	January 19, 2015	Haleakala	Pan-STARRS 1	·	1.8 km	MPC · JPL
881046	2015 BH_{555}	—	January 17, 2015	Mount Lemmon	Mount Lemmon Survey	·	2.1 km	MPC · JPL
881047	2015 BD_{557}	—	October 6, 2013	Catalina	CSS	·	2.1 km	MPC · JPL
881048	2015 BW_{559}	—	November 8, 2009	Mount Lemmon	Mount Lemmon Survey	critical	1.1 km	MPC · JPL
881049	2015 BS_{560}	—	June 18, 2010	WISE	WISE	·	2.5 km	MPC · JPL
881050	2015 BA_{569}	—	January 19, 2015	Haleakala	Pan-STARRS 1	·	770 m	MPC · JPL
881051	2015 BH_{569}	—	January 18, 2015	Haleakala	Pan-STARRS 1	·	1.0 km	MPC · JPL
881052	2015 BM_{569}	—	January 22, 2015	Haleakala	Pan-STARRS 1	·	510 m	MPC · JPL
881053	2015 BR_{569}	—	January 16, 2015	Haleakala	Pan-STARRS 1	JUN	960 m	MPC · JPL
881054	2015 BX_{570}	—	January 18, 2015	Mount Lemmon	Mount Lemmon Survey	·	2.5 km	MPC · JPL
881055	2015 BK_{572}	—	January 22, 2015	Haleakala	Pan-STARRS 1	·	800 m	MPC · JPL
881056	2015 BL_{572}	—	January 22, 2015	Haleakala	Pan-STARRS 1	·	1.0 km	MPC · JPL
881057	2015 BR_{574}	—	January 23, 2015	Haleakala	Pan-STARRS 1	·	1.1 km	MPC · JPL
881058	2015 BK_{575}	—	January 21, 2015	Haleakala	Pan-STARRS 1	·	1.3 km	MPC · JPL
881059	2015 BH_{576}	—	January 27, 2015	Haleakala	Pan-STARRS 1	·	2.4 km	MPC · JPL
881060	2015 BN_{576}	—	June 6, 2018	Haleakala	Pan-STARRS 1	LIX	2.6 km	MPC · JPL
881061	2015 BS_{576}	—	June 16, 2018	Haleakala	Pan-STARRS 1	·	2.3 km	MPC · JPL
881062	2015 BT_{576}	—	January 16, 2015	Haleakala	Pan-STARRS 1	THB	1.9 km	MPC · JPL
881063	2015 BU_{576}	—	January 21, 2015	Haleakala	Pan-STARRS 1	·	810 m	MPC · JPL
881064	2015 BK_{577}	—	April 26, 2017	Haleakala	Pan-STARRS 1	·	2.7 km	MPC · JPL
881065	2015 BN_{577}	—	March 3, 2016	Mount Lemmon	Mount Lemmon Survey	·	2.2 km	MPC · JPL
881066	2015 BF_{579}	—	January 27, 2015	Haleakala	Pan-STARRS 1	·	1.8 km	MPC · JPL
881067	2015 BH_{579}	—	January 18, 2015	Haleakala	Pan-STARRS 1	·	2.5 km	MPC · JPL
881068	2015 BO_{579}	—	January 17, 2015	Haleakala	Pan-STARRS 1	·	980 m	MPC · JPL
881069	2015 BO_{581}	—	November 4, 2004	Kitt Peak	Spacewatch	·	1.2 km	MPC · JPL
881070	2015 BJ_{582}	—	January 18, 2015	Mount Lemmon	Mount Lemmon Survey	·	1.7 km	MPC · JPL
881071	2015 BW_{585}	—	January 18, 2015	Haleakala	Pan-STARRS 1	·	1.9 km	MPC · JPL
881072	2015 BC_{586}	—	January 20, 2015	Catalina	CSS	·	1.7 km	MPC · JPL
881073	2015 BK_{586}	—	January 19, 2015	Mount Lemmon	Mount Lemmon Survey	·	2.2 km	MPC · JPL
881074	2015 BO_{586}	—	January 27, 2015	Haleakala	Pan-STARRS 1	·	2.2 km	MPC · JPL
881075	2015 BT_{587}	—	January 16, 2015	Haleakala	Pan-STARRS 1	·	2.1 km	MPC · JPL
881076	2015 BA_{588}	—	January 16, 2015	Haleakala	Pan-STARRS 1	·	2.7 km	MPC · JPL
881077	2015 BN_{588}	—	January 24, 2015	Haleakala	Pan-STARRS 1	TIR	1.8 km	MPC · JPL
881078	2015 BB_{589}	—	January 17, 2015	Haleakala	Pan-STARRS 1	·	1.8 km	MPC · JPL
881079	2015 BL_{590}	—	January 17, 2015	Haleakala	Pan-STARRS 1	·	2.0 km	MPC · JPL
881080	2015 BX_{590}	—	January 27, 2015	Haleakala	Pan-STARRS 1	·	2.2 km	MPC · JPL
881081	2015 BH_{591}	—	January 18, 2015	Haleakala	Pan-STARRS 1	·	2.1 km	MPC · JPL
881082	2015 BX_{596}	—	January 28, 2015	Haleakala	Pan-STARRS 1	·	2.4 km	MPC · JPL
881083	2015 BG_{597}	—	January 16, 2015	Haleakala	Pan-STARRS 1	·	1.4 km	MPC · JPL
881084	2015 BR_{599}	—	January 16, 2015	Haleakala	Pan-STARRS 1	·	2.3 km	MPC · JPL
881085	2015 BC_{600}	—	January 28, 2015	Haleakala	Pan-STARRS 1	·	2.3 km	MPC · JPL
881086	2015 BZ_{601}	—	January 20, 2015	Haleakala	Pan-STARRS 1	THM	1.8 km	MPC · JPL
881087	2015 BH_{607}	—	January 21, 2015	Haleakala	Pan-STARRS 1	·	2.1 km	MPC · JPL
881088	2015 BR_{609}	—	January 16, 2015	Haleakala	Pan-STARRS 1	·	1.1 km	MPC · JPL
881089	2015 BH_{612}	—	January 20, 2015	Haleakala	Pan-STARRS 1	·	2.0 km	MPC · JPL
881090	2015 BH_{616}	—	January 16, 2015	Haleakala	Pan-STARRS 1	·	1.2 km	MPC · JPL
881091	2015 CE_{5}	—	January 14, 2015	Haleakala	Pan-STARRS 1	·	2.1 km	MPC · JPL
881092	2015 CT_{6}	—	January 22, 2015	Haleakala	Pan-STARRS 1	·	700 m	MPC · JPL
881093	2015 CU_{10}	—	December 24, 2014	Kitt Peak	Spacewatch	THB	1.9 km	MPC · JPL
881094	2015 CR_{14}	—	December 17, 2009	Mount Lemmon	Mount Lemmon Survey	·	1.9 km	MPC · JPL
881095	2015 CV_{14}	—	March 29, 2004	Kitt Peak	Spacewatch	·	720 m	MPC · JPL
881096	2015 CD_{17}	—	February 8, 2015	XuYi	PMO NEO Survey Program	T_{j} (2.96)	3.3 km	MPC · JPL
881097	2015 CH_{18}	—	February 9, 2015	Mount Lemmon	Mount Lemmon Survey	·	2.6 km	MPC · JPL
881098	2015 CL_{23}	—	February 13, 2010	Mount Lemmon	Mount Lemmon Survey	·	2.0 km	MPC · JPL
881099	2015 CA_{37}	—	February 12, 2004	Kitt Peak	Spacewatch	·	2.1 km	MPC · JPL
881100	2015 CV_{37}	—	December 26, 2014	Haleakala	Pan-STARRS 1	·	2.0 km	MPC · JPL

== 881101–881200 ==
back to top

Designation			Discovery			Properties		Ref
Permanent	Provisional	Named after	Date	Site	Discoverer(s)	Category	Diam.	Ref
881101	2015 CG_{39}	—	November 24, 2008	Kitt Peak	Spacewatch	·	1.9 km	MPC · JPL
881102	2015 CW_{40}	—	January 19, 2015	Mount Lemmon	Mount Lemmon Survey	·	830 m	MPC · JPL
881103	2015 CC_{45}	—	January 21, 2015	Haleakala	Pan-STARRS 1	·	660 m	MPC · JPL
881104	2015 CV_{46}	—	February 15, 2015	Haleakala	Pan-STARRS 1	NYS	850 m	MPC · JPL
881105	2015 CF_{50}	—	January 21, 2015	Haleakala	Pan-STARRS 1	·	2.2 km	MPC · JPL
881106	2015 CC_{61}	—	February 13, 2015	Mount Lemmon	Mount Lemmon Survey	TIR	2.0 km	MPC · JPL
881107	2015 CB_{65}	—	January 23, 2015	Haleakala	Pan-STARRS 1	·	1.7 km	MPC · JPL
881108	2015 CE_{65}	—	August 10, 2007	Kitt Peak	Spacewatch	·	3.1 km	MPC · JPL
881109	2015 CT_{65}	—	December 27, 2014	Mount Lemmon	Mount Lemmon Survey	·	2.2 km	MPC · JPL
881110	2015 CQ_{66}	—	October 5, 2013	Haleakala	Pan-STARRS 1	LIX	2.3 km	MPC · JPL
881111	2015 CD_{71}	—	February 13, 2015	Mount Lemmon	Mount Lemmon Survey	·	2.8 km	MPC · JPL
881112	2015 CL_{72}	—	February 8, 2015	Mount Lemmon	Mount Lemmon Survey	THM	1.7 km	MPC · JPL
881113	2015 CU_{77}	—	December 18, 2014	Haleakala	Pan-STARRS 1	·	2.1 km	MPC · JPL
881114	2015 DC	—	January 19, 2015	Haleakala	Pan-STARRS 1	·	1.1 km	MPC · JPL
881115	2015 DA_{6}	—	January 14, 2015	Haleakala	Pan-STARRS 1	VER	2.0 km	MPC · JPL
881116	2015 DK_{6}	—	January 19, 2015	Mount Lemmon	Mount Lemmon Survey	·	820 m	MPC · JPL
881117	2015 DA_{8}	—	December 21, 2014	Mount Lemmon	Mount Lemmon Survey	THM	1.5 km	MPC · JPL
881118	2015 DZ_{10}	—	December 21, 2014	Mount Lemmon	Mount Lemmon Survey	·	2.3 km	MPC · JPL
881119	2015 DE_{11}	—	January 17, 2015	Haleakala	Pan-STARRS 1	H	400 m	MPC · JPL
881120	2015 DT_{13}	—	November 1, 2008	Kitt Peak	Spacewatch	·	1.3 km	MPC · JPL
881121	2015 DU_{21}	—	January 24, 2015	Mount Lemmon	Mount Lemmon Survey	·	2.6 km	MPC · JPL
881122	2015 DH_{23}	—	February 16, 2015	Haleakala	Pan-STARRS 1	EUP	2.0 km	MPC · JPL
881123	2015 DB_{24}	—	January 19, 2015	Mount Lemmon	Mount Lemmon Survey	·	2.0 km	MPC · JPL
881124	2015 DX_{26}	—	February 16, 2015	Haleakala	Pan-STARRS 1	·	1.7 km	MPC · JPL
881125	2015 DC_{27}	—	January 29, 2015	Haleakala	Pan-STARRS 1	·	2.3 km	MPC · JPL
881126	2015 DB_{39}	—	October 26, 2013	Mount Lemmon	Mount Lemmon Survey	THB	2.0 km	MPC · JPL
881127	2015 DZ_{39}	—	October 5, 2013	Haleakala	Pan-STARRS 1	·	1.8 km	MPC · JPL
881128	2015 DR_{53}	—	July 11, 1994	La Silla	H. Debehogne, E. W. Elst	H	780 m	MPC · JPL
881129	2015 DX_{56}	—	February 16, 2015	Haleakala	Pan-STARRS 1	·	2.0 km	MPC · JPL
881130	2015 DY_{56}	—	January 22, 2015	Haleakala	Pan-STARRS 1	·	1.5 km	MPC · JPL
881131	2015 DG_{61}	—	February 16, 2015	Haleakala	Pan-STARRS 1	·	2.4 km	MPC · JPL
881132	2015 DT_{64}	—	January 22, 2015	Haleakala	Pan-STARRS 1	·	2.2 km	MPC · JPL
881133	2015 DU_{65}	—	January 19, 2015	Kitt Peak	Spacewatch	·	2.3 km	MPC · JPL
881134	2015 DK_{69}	—	January 22, 2015	Haleakala	Pan-STARRS 1	·	2.4 km	MPC · JPL
881135	2015 DB_{77}	—	September 14, 2013	Haleakala	Pan-STARRS 1	·	1.6 km	MPC · JPL
881136	2015 DO_{91}	—	January 17, 2015	Kitt Peak	Spacewatch	H	490 m	MPC · JPL
881137	2015 DL_{99}	—	February 25, 2011	Mount Lemmon	Mount Lemmon Survey	·	770 m	MPC · JPL
881138	2015 DK_{105}	—	February 12, 2004	Palomar	NEAT	H	500 m	MPC · JPL
881139	2015 DF_{109}	—	January 29, 2015	Haleakala	Pan-STARRS 1	THB	1.8 km	MPC · JPL
881140	2015 DH_{110}	—	January 15, 2015	Haleakala	Pan-STARRS 1	·	2.1 km	MPC · JPL
881141	2015 DY_{115}	—	January 15, 2015	Haleakala	Pan-STARRS 1	·	2.1 km	MPC · JPL
881142	2015 DT_{117}	—	December 1, 2010	Mount Lemmon	Mount Lemmon Survey	·	550 m	MPC · JPL
881143	2015 DN_{118}	—	February 17, 2015	Haleakala	Pan-STARRS 1	·	980 m	MPC · JPL
881144	2015 DY_{131}	—	January 21, 2015	Haleakala	Pan-STARRS 1	·	920 m	MPC · JPL
881145	2015 DU_{133}	—	February 17, 2015	Haleakala	Pan-STARRS 1	·	2.8 km	MPC · JPL
881146	2015 DH_{134}	—	February 17, 2015	Haleakala	Pan-STARRS 1	PHO	650 m	MPC · JPL
881147	2015 DK_{136}	—	February 17, 2015	Haleakala	Pan-STARRS 1	·	2.7 km	MPC · JPL
881148	2015 DN_{138}	—	February 17, 2015	Haleakala	Pan-STARRS 1	·	2.0 km	MPC · JPL
881149	2015 DY_{139}	—	February 18, 2015	Mount Lemmon	Mount Lemmon Survey	·	460 m	MPC · JPL
881150	2015 DV_{141}	—	January 17, 2015	Mount Lemmon	Mount Lemmon Survey	H	440 m	MPC · JPL
881151	2015 DR_{144}	—	November 25, 2014	Haleakala	Pan-STARRS 1	·	1.7 km	MPC · JPL
881152	2015 DZ_{144}	—	January 26, 2015	Haleakala	Pan-STARRS 1	·	2.4 km	MPC · JPL
881153	2015 DB_{145}	—	January 18, 2015	Mount Lemmon	Mount Lemmon Survey	·	1.8 km	MPC · JPL
881154	2015 DT_{145}	—	January 26, 2006	Kitt Peak	Spacewatch	·	1.5 km	MPC · JPL
881155	2015 DA_{146}	—	January 19, 2015	Mount Lemmon	Mount Lemmon Survey	·	2.1 km	MPC · JPL
881156	2015 DE_{147}	—	January 19, 2015	Haleakala	Pan-STARRS 1	·	2.2 km	MPC · JPL
881157	2015 DG_{148}	—	February 9, 2015	Mount Lemmon	Mount Lemmon Survey	·	2.0 km	MPC · JPL
881158	2015 DV_{148}	—	January 2, 2011	Mount Lemmon	Mount Lemmon Survey	·	1.1 km	MPC · JPL
881159	2015 DR_{149}	—	March 8, 2005	Mount Lemmon	Mount Lemmon Survey	·	3.5 km	MPC · JPL
881160	2015 DO_{150}	—	January 21, 2015	Haleakala	Pan-STARRS 1	·	2.4 km	MPC · JPL
881161	2015 DM_{158}	—	February 18, 2015	Haleakala	Pan-STARRS 1	·	1.0 km	MPC · JPL
881162	2015 DF_{162}	—	October 4, 2007	Mount Lemmon	Mount Lemmon Survey	KOR	1.1 km	MPC · JPL
881163	2015 DB_{169}	—	January 25, 2015	Haleakala	Pan-STARRS 1	TIR	1.7 km	MPC · JPL
881164	2015 DK_{169}	—	January 25, 2015	Haleakala	Pan-STARRS 1	·	2.1 km	MPC · JPL
881165	2015 DB_{172}	—	October 22, 1995	Kitt Peak	Spacewatch	·	770 m	MPC · JPL
881166	2015 DG_{174}	—	February 19, 2015	Haleakala	Pan-STARRS 1	·	890 m	MPC · JPL
881167	2015 DY_{175}	—	February 19, 2015	Haleakala	Pan-STARRS 1	·	1.1 km	MPC · JPL
881168	2015 DM_{178}	—	January 24, 2015	Haleakala	Pan-STARRS 1	·	1.8 km	MPC · JPL
881169	2015 DT_{178}	—	January 24, 2015	Haleakala	Pan-STARRS 1	·	2.1 km	MPC · JPL
881170	2015 DD_{189}	—	November 27, 2013	Haleakala	Pan-STARRS 1	·	2.0 km	MPC · JPL
881171	2015 DM_{194}	—	January 27, 2015	Haleakala	Pan-STARRS 1	·	2.2 km	MPC · JPL
881172	2015 DN_{195}	—	February 22, 2015	Haleakala	Pan-STARRS 1	H	410 m	MPC · JPL
881173	2015 DR_{195}	—	December 25, 2014	Haleakala	Pan-STARRS 1	·	1.6 km	MPC · JPL
881174	2015 DX_{195}	—	February 22, 2015	Haleakala	Pan-STARRS 1	·	2.2 km	MPC · JPL
881175	2015 DY_{195}	—	January 16, 2015	Mount Lemmon	Mount Lemmon Survey	·	2.2 km	MPC · JPL
881176	2015 DP_{197}	—	February 14, 2009	Catalina	CSS	T_{j} (2.94)	2.9 km	MPC · JPL
881177	2015 DC_{198}	—	November 23, 2014	Mount Lemmon	Mount Lemmon Survey	·	560 m	MPC · JPL
881178	2015 DV_{204}	—	January 18, 2015	Haleakala	Pan-STARRS 1	H	520 m	MPC · JPL
881179	2015 DT_{206}	—	January 25, 2015	Haleakala	Pan-STARRS 1	·	1.0 km	MPC · JPL
881180	2015 DO_{209}	—	January 28, 2015	Haleakala	Pan-STARRS 1	·	1.2 km	MPC · JPL
881181	2015 DR_{217}	—	January 20, 2015	Haleakala	Pan-STARRS 1	·	2.5 km	MPC · JPL
881182	2015 DY_{221}	—	February 16, 2015	Haleakala	Pan-STARRS 1	URS	2.2 km	MPC · JPL
881183	2015 DF_{224}	—	January 15, 2015	Haleakala	Pan-STARRS 1	TIR	2.0 km	MPC · JPL
881184	2015 DW_{229}	—	February 18, 2015	Haleakala	Pan-STARRS 1	·	1.0 km	MPC · JPL
881185	2015 DJ_{243}	—	January 23, 2015	Haleakala	Pan-STARRS 1	·	2.0 km	MPC · JPL
881186	2015 DB_{251}	—	February 16, 2015	Haleakala	Pan-STARRS 1	·	1.3 km	MPC · JPL
881187	2015 DV_{251}	—	February 16, 2015	Haleakala	Pan-STARRS 1	MAR	750 m	MPC · JPL
881188	2015 DW_{251}	—	February 18, 2015	Mount Lemmon	Mount Lemmon Survey	·	1.1 km	MPC · JPL
881189	2015 DL_{252}	—	February 17, 2015	Haleakala	Pan-STARRS 1	MAR	720 m	MPC · JPL
881190	2015 DB_{253}	—	February 27, 2015	Haleakala	Pan-STARRS 1	·	1.2 km	MPC · JPL
881191	2015 DZ_{255}	—	February 20, 2015	Haleakala	Pan-STARRS 1	·	2.6 km	MPC · JPL
881192	2015 DA_{256}	—	February 23, 2015	Haleakala	Pan-STARRS 1	·	2.2 km	MPC · JPL
881193	2015 DS_{256}	—	October 18, 2017	Mount Lemmon	Mount Lemmon Survey	EUN	1.1 km	MPC · JPL
881194	2015 DC_{257}	—	February 19, 2015	Haleakala	Pan-STARRS 1	TIR	1.6 km	MPC · JPL
881195	2015 DA_{258}	—	February 25, 2015	Haleakala	Pan-STARRS 1	LUT	2.7 km	MPC · JPL
881196	2015 DH_{258}	—	February 20, 2015	Haleakala	Pan-STARRS 1	·	900 m	MPC · JPL
881197	2015 DG_{259}	—	February 20, 2015	Haleakala	Pan-STARRS 1	·	2.2 km	MPC · JPL
881198	2015 DW_{260}	—	February 25, 2015	Haleakala	Pan-STARRS 1	·	790 m	MPC · JPL
881199	2015 DG_{261}	—	February 18, 2015	XuYi	PMO NEO Survey Program	·	2.1 km	MPC · JPL
881200	2015 DZ_{262}	—	February 16, 2015	Haleakala	Pan-STARRS 1	·	1.9 km	MPC · JPL

== 881201–881300 ==
back to top

Designation			Discovery			Properties		Ref
Permanent	Provisional	Named after	Date	Site	Discoverer(s)	Category	Diam.	Ref
881201	2015 DX_{263}	—	February 23, 2015	Haleakala	Pan-STARRS 1	·	2.5 km	MPC · JPL
881202	2015 DO_{267}	—	February 16, 2015	Haleakala	Pan-STARRS 1	·	1.8 km	MPC · JPL
881203	2015 DD_{268}	—	February 16, 2015	Haleakala	Pan-STARRS 1	·	2.0 km	MPC · JPL
881204	2015 DZ_{268}	—	February 19, 2015	Kitt Peak	Spacewatch	THB	1.9 km	MPC · JPL
881205	2015 DQ_{271}	—	February 18, 2015	Haleakala	Pan-STARRS 1	·	2.0 km	MPC · JPL
881206	2015 DW_{274}	—	February 18, 2015	Haleakala	Pan-STARRS 1	·	900 m	MPC · JPL
881207	2015 DD_{276}	—	February 24, 2015	Haleakala	Pan-STARRS 1	ULA	2.8 km	MPC · JPL
881208	2015 DB_{280}	—	February 16, 2015	Haleakala	Pan-STARRS 1	·	2.2 km	MPC · JPL
881209	2015 DP_{283}	—	February 20, 2015	Haleakala	Pan-STARRS 1	·	2.1 km	MPC · JPL
881210	2015 DD_{284}	—	January 23, 2015	Haleakala	Pan-STARRS 1	·	2.9 km	MPC · JPL
881211	2015 DX_{287}	—	February 27, 2015	Haleakala	Pan-STARRS 1	·	750 m	MPC · JPL
881212	2015 DS_{295}	—	January 20, 2015	Haleakala	Pan-STARRS 1	·	690 m	MPC · JPL
881213	2015 DC_{299}	—	February 16, 2015	Haleakala	Pan-STARRS 1	MAR	790 m	MPC · JPL
881214	2015 DM_{299}	—	January 28, 2015	Haleakala	Pan-STARRS 1	EUN	950 m	MPC · JPL
881215	2015 DP_{299}	—	February 24, 2015	Haleakala	Pan-STARRS 1	·	710 m	MPC · JPL
881216	2015 DQ_{299}	—	February 23, 2015	Haleakala	Pan-STARRS 1	MAR	710 m	MPC · JPL
881217	2015 DN_{301}	—	February 16, 2015	Haleakala	Pan-STARRS 1	·	1.1 km	MPC · JPL
881218	2015 DU_{305}	—	February 24, 2015	Haleakala	Pan-STARRS 1	·	1.0 km	MPC · JPL
881219	2015 DL_{323}	—	October 3, 2013	Catalina	CSS	·	1.1 km	MPC · JPL
881220	2015 DG_{362}	—	February 20, 2015	Haleakala	Pan-STARRS 1	·	2.3 km	MPC · JPL
881221	2015 EZ_{2}	—	January 20, 2015	Haleakala	Pan-STARRS 1	PHO	730 m	MPC · JPL
881222	2015 EE_{5}	—	February 16, 2015	Haleakala	Pan-STARRS 1	EOS	1.6 km	MPC · JPL
881223	2015 EK_{17}	—	September 9, 2013	Haleakala	Pan-STARRS 1	THB	2.0 km	MPC · JPL
881224	2015 EH_{23}	—	March 11, 2015	Mount Lemmon	Mount Lemmon Survey	·	1.9 km	MPC · JPL
881225	2015 EQ_{26}	—	February 10, 2015	Mount Lemmon	Mount Lemmon Survey	·	2.4 km	MPC · JPL
881226	2015 EQ_{42}	—	March 16, 2004	Socorro	LINEAR	T_{j} (2.99)	3.0 km	MPC · JPL
881227	2015 EK_{44}	—	January 15, 2015	Haleakala	Pan-STARRS 1	PHO	950 m	MPC · JPL
881228	2015 EU_{54}	—	December 21, 2008	Mount Lemmon	Mount Lemmon Survey	·	2.1 km	MPC · JPL
881229	2015 EY_{58}	—	March 14, 2015	Haleakala	Pan-STARRS 1	T_{j} (2.98)	2.3 km	MPC · JPL
881230	2015 EK_{69}	—	November 4, 2007	Mount Lemmon	Mount Lemmon Survey	·	2.2 km	MPC · JPL
881231	2015 ER_{75}	—	March 15, 2015	Haleakala	Pan-STARRS 1	H	460 m	MPC · JPL
881232	2015 EF_{77}	—	March 15, 2015	Haleakala	Pan-STARRS 1	·	1.3 km	MPC · JPL
881233	2015 EA_{78}	—	February 27, 2015	Mount Lemmon	Mount Lemmon Survey	TIR	2.1 km	MPC · JPL
881234	2015 EC_{78}	—	March 13, 2015	Mount Lemmon	Mount Lemmon Survey	·	2.5 km	MPC · JPL
881235	2015 EX_{78}	—	January 21, 2015	Haleakala	Pan-STARRS 1	KOR	1.1 km	MPC · JPL
881236	2015 FJ_{1}	—	February 13, 2015	Piszkéstető	K. Sárneczky	·	970 m	MPC · JPL
881237	2015 FG_{3}	—	January 28, 2007	Kitt Peak	Spacewatch	·	1.1 km	MPC · JPL
881238	2015 FG_{4}	—	January 27, 2015	Haleakala	Pan-STARRS 1	526	1.6 km	MPC · JPL
881239	2015 FN_{5}	—	February 23, 2015	Haleakala	Pan-STARRS 1	TIR	1.8 km	MPC · JPL
881240	2015 FU_{5}	—	March 16, 2015	Haleakala	Pan-STARRS 1	·	1.9 km	MPC · JPL
881241	2015 FG_{6}	—	June 28, 2010	WISE	WISE	T_{j} (2.98)	2.3 km	MPC · JPL
881242	2015 FP_{6}	—	January 20, 2015	Kitt Peak	Spacewatch	·	2.2 km	MPC · JPL
881243	2015 FL_{9}	—	January 31, 2009	Mount Lemmon	Mount Lemmon Survey	·	1.9 km	MPC · JPL
881244	2015 FP_{9}	—	February 18, 2015	Haleakala	Pan-STARRS 1	·	920 m	MPC · JPL
881245	2015 FF_{15}	—	March 16, 2015	Haleakala	Pan-STARRS 1	MAR	860 m	MPC · JPL
881246	2015 FC_{19}	—	March 16, 2015	Haleakala	Pan-STARRS 1	·	810 m	MPC · JPL
881247	2015 FE_{23}	—	March 16, 2015	Haleakala	Pan-STARRS 1	·	1.0 km	MPC · JPL
881248	2015 FG_{26}	—	January 17, 2015	Haleakala	Pan-STARRS 1	·	2.0 km	MPC · JPL
881249	2015 FJ_{28}	—	March 16, 2015	Haleakala	Pan-STARRS 1	PHO	650 m	MPC · JPL
881250	2015 FY_{30}	—	May 13, 2004	Kitt Peak	Spacewatch	·	3.3 km	MPC · JPL
881251	2015 FU_{46}	—	January 15, 2015	Haleakala	Pan-STARRS 1	·	1.5 km	MPC · JPL
881252	2015 FB_{48}	—	March 16, 2015	Mount Lemmon	Mount Lemmon Survey	·	2.4 km	MPC · JPL
881253	2015 FM_{52}	—	August 9, 2013	Kitt Peak	Spacewatch	T_{j} (2.98)	2.4 km	MPC · JPL
881254	2015 FW_{56}	—	October 5, 2013	Haleakala	Pan-STARRS 1	·	2.0 km	MPC · JPL
881255	2015 FU_{57}	—	April 4, 2010	Kitt Peak	Spacewatch	·	2.3 km	MPC · JPL
881256	2015 FM_{58}	—	November 10, 2013	Kitt Peak	Spacewatch	·	1.9 km	MPC · JPL
881257	2015 FE_{61}	—	January 26, 2015	Haleakala	Pan-STARRS 1	·	2.4 km	MPC · JPL
881258	2015 FO_{62}	—	March 18, 2015	Haleakala	Pan-STARRS 1	·	2.2 km	MPC · JPL
881259	2015 FW_{63}	—	February 20, 2015	Haleakala	Pan-STARRS 1	·	900 m	MPC · JPL
881260	2015 FU_{69}	—	March 18, 2015	Haleakala	Pan-STARRS 1	·	1.2 km	MPC · JPL
881261	2015 FU_{71}	—	March 18, 2015	Haleakala	Pan-STARRS 1	·	670 m	MPC · JPL
881262	2015 FG_{79}	—	January 22, 2015	Haleakala	Pan-STARRS 1	·	890 m	MPC · JPL
881263	2015 FZ_{88}	—	February 23, 2015	Haleakala	Pan-STARRS 1	·	980 m	MPC · JPL
881264	2015 FS_{95}	—	March 20, 2015	Haleakala	Pan-STARRS 1	·	2.1 km	MPC · JPL
881265	2015 FW_{95}	—	November 24, 2013	Haleakala	Pan-STARRS 1	THB	1.8 km	MPC · JPL
881266	2015 FO_{105}	—	January 20, 2015	Haleakala	Pan-STARRS 1	·	840 m	MPC · JPL
881267	2015 FQ_{108}	—	January 22, 2015	Haleakala	Pan-STARRS 1	·	770 m	MPC · JPL
881268	2015 FT_{108}	—	March 20, 2015	Haleakala	Pan-STARRS 1	·	1.3 km	MPC · JPL
881269	2015 FL_{111}	—	March 20, 2015	Haleakala	Pan-STARRS 1	·	1.3 km	MPC · JPL
881270	2015 FZ_{113}	—	April 13, 2011	Mount Lemmon	Mount Lemmon Survey	KON	1.7 km	MPC · JPL
881271	2015 FG_{115}	—	March 20, 2015	Haleakala	Pan-STARRS 1	·	2.3 km	MPC · JPL
881272	2015 FP_{117}	—	September 21, 2011	Mount Lemmon	Mount Lemmon Survey	·	260 m	MPC · JPL
881273	2015 FP_{120}	—	January 11, 2010	Kitt Peak	Spacewatch	T_{j} (2.96)	4.3 km	MPC · JPL
881274	2015 FY_{125}	—	January 21, 2015	Haleakala	Pan-STARRS 1	·	2.5 km	MPC · JPL
881275	2015 FZ_{129}	—	September 9, 2013	Haleakala	Pan-STARRS 1	T_{j} (2.99) · EUP	2.3 km	MPC · JPL
881276	2015 FC_{130}	—	November 9, 2013	Haleakala	Pan-STARRS 1	·	2.3 km	MPC · JPL
881277	2015 FD_{130}	—	March 20, 2015	Haleakala	Pan-STARRS 1	·	2.2 km	MPC · JPL
881278	2015 FH_{130}	—	January 14, 2015	Haleakala	Pan-STARRS 1	·	1.8 km	MPC · JPL
881279	2015 FF_{131}	—	January 14, 2015	Haleakala	Pan-STARRS 1	·	1.0 km	MPC · JPL
881280	2015 FO_{139}	—	March 21, 2015	Haleakala	Pan-STARRS 1	L4	6.6 km	MPC · JPL
881281	2015 FC_{143}	—	October 8, 2012	Haleakala	Pan-STARRS 1	·	990 m	MPC · JPL
881282	2015 FK_{154}	—	January 23, 2015	Haleakala	Pan-STARRS 1	HNS	960 m	MPC · JPL
881283	2015 FB_{160}	—	February 14, 2015	Mount Lemmon	Mount Lemmon Survey	·	1.0 km	MPC · JPL
881284	2015 FZ_{169}	—	March 21, 2015	Haleakala	Pan-STARRS 1	·	740 m	MPC · JPL
881285	2015 FE_{178}	—	April 13, 2011	Mount Lemmon	Mount Lemmon Survey	·	1.1 km	MPC · JPL
881286	2015 FU_{185}	—	January 18, 2015	Haleakala	Pan-STARRS 1	EUP	2.2 km	MPC · JPL
881287	2015 FT_{186}	—	March 22, 2015	Mount Lemmon	Mount Lemmon Survey	PHO	650 m	MPC · JPL
881288	2015 FN_{188}	—	January 16, 2015	Haleakala	Pan-STARRS 1	TIR	2.4 km	MPC · JPL
881289	2015 FN_{192}	—	February 23, 2015	Haleakala	Pan-STARRS 1	·	2.1 km	MPC · JPL
881290	2015 FX_{192}	—	March 22, 2015	Haleakala	Pan-STARRS 1	·	730 m	MPC · JPL
881291	2015 FR_{212}	—	November 26, 2013	Mount Lemmon	Mount Lemmon Survey	·	2.2 km	MPC · JPL
881292	2015 FV_{223}	—	September 6, 2008	Mount Lemmon	Mount Lemmon Survey	·	930 m	MPC · JPL
881293	2015 FU_{228}	—	March 21, 2015	Mount Lemmon	Mount Lemmon Survey	·	1.2 km	MPC · JPL
881294	2015 FK_{242}	—	February 16, 2015	Haleakala	Pan-STARRS 1	MAR	840 m	MPC · JPL
881295	2015 FS_{260}	—	February 16, 2015	Haleakala	Pan-STARRS 1	HNS	680 m	MPC · JPL
881296	2015 FH_{277}	—	February 18, 2015	Haleakala	Pan-STARRS 1	MAR	730 m	MPC · JPL
881297	2015 FN_{279}	—	March 19, 2015	Cerro Paranal	Gaia Ground Based Optical Tracking	·	880 m	MPC · JPL
881298	2015 FR_{304}	—	August 2, 2011	Siding Spring	SSS	·	1.6 km	MPC · JPL
881299	2015 FB_{315}	—	March 25, 2015	Haleakala	Pan-STARRS 1	·	1.3 km	MPC · JPL
881300	2015 FZ_{320}	—	March 25, 2015	Haleakala	Pan-STARRS 1	·	820 m	MPC · JPL

== 881301–881400 ==
back to top

Designation			Discovery			Properties		Ref
Permanent	Provisional	Named after	Date	Site	Discoverer(s)	Category	Diam.	Ref
881301	2015 FS_{328}	—	March 25, 2015	Haleakala	Pan-STARRS 1	·	990 m	MPC · JPL
881302	2015 FU_{331}	—	March 28, 2015	Haleakala	Pan-STARRS 1	·	1.2 km	MPC · JPL
881303	2015 FS_{332}	—	March 28, 2015	Haleakala	Pan-STARRS 1	APO · PHA	730 m	MPC · JPL
881304	2015 FM_{337}	—	May 24, 2006	Kitt Peak	Spacewatch	JUN	840 m	MPC · JPL
881305	2015 FF_{346}	—	January 25, 2015	Haleakala	Pan-STARRS 1	·	1.7 km	MPC · JPL
881306	2015 FH_{346}	—	October 26, 2008	Mount Lemmon	Mount Lemmon Survey	·	1.9 km	MPC · JPL
881307	2015 FV_{350}	—	December 7, 2013	Haleakala	Pan-STARRS 1	·	2.0 km	MPC · JPL
881308	2015 FR_{353}	—	March 17, 2015	Haleakala	Pan-STARRS 1	·	1.2 km	MPC · JPL
881309	2015 FC_{354}	—	March 17, 2015	Haleakala	Pan-STARRS 1	·	850 m	MPC · JPL
881310	2015 FV_{355}	—	March 17, 2015	Haleakala	Pan-STARRS 1	·	790 m	MPC · JPL
881311	2015 FV_{359}	—	March 17, 2015	Haleakala	Pan-STARRS 1	EUN	890 m	MPC · JPL
881312	2015 FR_{365}	—	March 18, 2015	Haleakala	Pan-STARRS 1	·	1.2 km	MPC · JPL
881313	2015 FK_{366}	—	January 18, 2015	Haleakala	Pan-STARRS 1	PHO	710 m	MPC · JPL
881314	2015 FG_{373}	—	February 16, 2015	Haleakala	Pan-STARRS 1	·	2.3 km	MPC · JPL
881315	2015 FS_{379}	—	January 21, 2015	Haleakala	Pan-STARRS 1	H	370 m	MPC · JPL
881316	2015 FJ_{380}	—	March 20, 2015	Haleakala	Pan-STARRS 1	·	800 m	MPC · JPL
881317	2015 FH_{381}	—	October 18, 2007	Mount Lemmon	Mount Lemmon Survey	·	2.0 km	MPC · JPL
881318	2015 FT_{381}	—	March 20, 2015	Haleakala	Pan-STARRS 1	·	880 m	MPC · JPL
881319	2015 FK_{382}	—	January 3, 2009	Kitt Peak	Spacewatch	·	2.1 km	MPC · JPL
881320	2015 FO_{382}	—	January 29, 2015	Haleakala	Pan-STARRS 1	·	540 m	MPC · JPL
881321	2015 FO_{385}	—	January 22, 2015	Haleakala	Pan-STARRS 1	·	810 m	MPC · JPL
881322	2015 FZ_{387}	—	September 15, 2013	Haleakala	Pan-STARRS 1	H	400 m	MPC · JPL
881323	2015 FG_{406}	—	March 17, 2015	Mount Lemmon	Mount Lemmon Survey	MAR	800 m	MPC · JPL
881324	2015 FY_{406}	—	January 20, 2015	Haleakala	Pan-STARRS 1	·	1.1 km	MPC · JPL
881325	2015 FN_{407}	—	March 21, 2015	Haleakala	Pan-STARRS 1	·	1.4 km	MPC · JPL
881326	2015 FB_{409}	—	December 31, 2008	Kitt Peak	Spacewatch	TIR	2.3 km	MPC · JPL
881327	2015 FS_{409}	—	March 22, 2015	Haleakala	Pan-STARRS 1	·	1.4 km	MPC · JPL
881328	2015 FA_{412}	—	March 28, 2015	Haleakala	Pan-STARRS 1	·	1.4 km	MPC · JPL
881329	2015 FQ_{412}	—	June 7, 2011	Mount Lemmon	Mount Lemmon Survey	EUN	880 m	MPC · JPL
881330	2015 FN_{415}	—	March 28, 2015	Kitt Peak	Spacewatch	·	1.1 km	MPC · JPL
881331	2015 FV_{415}	—	March 18, 2015	Haleakala	Pan-STARRS 1	·	960 m	MPC · JPL
881332	2015 FQ_{416}	—	March 28, 2015	Haleakala	Pan-STARRS 1	H	560 m	MPC · JPL
881333	2015 FD_{417}	—	March 28, 2015	Mount Lemmon	Mount Lemmon Survey	·	1.9 km	MPC · JPL
881334	2015 FG_{417}	—	March 22, 2015	Haleakala	Pan-STARRS 1	(1547)	1.4 km	MPC · JPL
881335	2015 FO_{417}	—	March 28, 2015	Haleakala	Pan-STARRS 1	·	980 m	MPC · JPL
881336	2015 FG_{418}	—	March 28, 2015	Haleakala	Pan-STARRS 1	·	1.1 km	MPC · JPL
881337	2015 FO_{418}	—	March 25, 2015	Haleakala	Pan-STARRS 1	·	1.3 km	MPC · JPL
881338	2015 FN_{420}	—	March 22, 2015	Mount Lemmon	Mount Lemmon Survey	·	850 m	MPC · JPL
881339	2015 FC_{421}	—	March 29, 2015	Haleakala	Pan-STARRS 1	EUN	750 m	MPC · JPL
881340	2015 FK_{421}	—	March 28, 2015	Haleakala	Pan-STARRS 1	·	700 m	MPC · JPL
881341	2015 FU_{421}	—	March 28, 2015	Haleakala	Pan-STARRS 1	·	2.0 km	MPC · JPL
881342	2015 FC_{424}	—	March 28, 2015	Haleakala	Pan-STARRS 1	BRG	830 m	MPC · JPL
881343	2015 FU_{424}	—	March 21, 2015	Haleakala	Pan-STARRS 1	MAR	690 m	MPC · JPL
881344	2015 FB_{425}	—	March 25, 2015	Haleakala	Pan-STARRS 1	JUN	800 m	MPC · JPL
881345	2015 FX_{426}	—	March 21, 2015	Haleakala	Pan-STARRS 1	HNS	760 m	MPC · JPL
881346	2015 FJ_{430}	—	March 27, 2015	Kitt Peak	Spacewatch	·	2.1 km	MPC · JPL
881347	2015 FJ_{432}	—	March 28, 2015	Haleakala	Pan-STARRS 1	HNS	930 m	MPC · JPL
881348	2015 FJ_{433}	—	March 24, 2015	Haleakala	Pan-STARRS 1	JUN	610 m	MPC · JPL
881349	2015 FK_{433}	—	March 26, 2015	Mount Lemmon	Mount Lemmon Survey	·	1.2 km	MPC · JPL
881350	2015 FD_{434}	—	March 22, 2015	Haleakala	Pan-STARRS 1	·	1.2 km	MPC · JPL
881351	2015 FZ_{439}	—	March 29, 2015	Haleakala	Pan-STARRS 1	T_{j} (2.95) · 3:2	4.1 km	MPC · JPL
881352	2015 FV_{443}	—	January 23, 2015	Haleakala	Pan-STARRS 1	·	2.2 km	MPC · JPL
881353	2015 FP_{448}	—	March 25, 2015	Mount Lemmon	Mount Lemmon Survey	·	940 m	MPC · JPL
881354	2015 FF_{451}	—	March 25, 2015	Mount Lemmon	Mount Lemmon Survey	·	930 m	MPC · JPL
881355	2015 FF_{475}	—	March 25, 2015	Haleakala	Pan-STARRS 1	·	1.2 km	MPC · JPL
881356	2015 GM	—	April 9, 2015	Mount Lemmon	Mount Lemmon Survey	·	300 m	MPC · JPL
881357	2015 GB_{11}	—	February 17, 2015	Haleakala	Pan-STARRS 1	·	820 m	MPC · JPL
881358	2015 GZ_{18}	—	March 30, 2015	Haleakala	Pan-STARRS 1	·	2.2 km	MPC · JPL
881359	2015 GX_{25}	—	February 16, 2015	Haleakala	Pan-STARRS 1	·	1.4 km	MPC · JPL
881360	2015 GB_{32}	—	January 23, 2015	Haleakala	Pan-STARRS 1	·	1.1 km	MPC · JPL
881361	2015 GE_{35}	—	March 27, 2015	Kitt Peak	Spacewatch	MAR	760 m	MPC · JPL
881362	2015 GZ_{37}	—	March 27, 2015	Haleakala	Pan-STARRS 1	·	1.3 km	MPC · JPL
881363	2015 GH_{38}	—	February 11, 2011	Catalina	CSS	·	900 m	MPC · JPL
881364	2015 GN_{38}	—	March 25, 2015	Haleakala	Pan-STARRS 1	·	690 m	MPC · JPL
881365	2015 GN_{59}	—	April 11, 2015	Kitt Peak	Spacewatch	·	1.3 km	MPC · JPL
881366	2015 GX_{59}	—	April 14, 2015	Mount Lemmon	Mount Lemmon Survey	·	930 m	MPC · JPL
881367	2015 GR_{60}	—	March 25, 2015	Mount Lemmon	Mount Lemmon Survey	·	930 m	MPC · JPL
881368	2015 GB_{63}	—	April 12, 2015	Haleakala	Pan-STARRS 1	H	360 m	MPC · JPL
881369	2015 GP_{63}	—	April 13, 2015	Haleakala	Pan-STARRS 1	EUN	900 m	MPC · JPL
881370	2015 GP_{64}	—	April 11, 2015	Mount Lemmon	Mount Lemmon Survey	·	800 m	MPC · JPL
881371	2015 GW_{64}	—	April 10, 2015	Mount Lemmon	Mount Lemmon Survey	H	280 m	MPC · JPL
881372	2015 GZ_{66}	—	April 4, 2015	Haleakala	Pan-STARRS 1	HNS	760 m	MPC · JPL
881373	2015 GE_{73}	—	September 20, 2009	Mount Lemmon	Mount Lemmon Survey	L4	6.0 km	MPC · JPL
881374	2015 GR_{76}	—	March 27, 2015	Kitt Peak	Spacewatch	·	1.1 km	MPC · JPL
881375	2015 GG_{80}	—	April 14, 2015	Mount Lemmon	Mount Lemmon Survey	EOS	1.3 km	MPC · JPL
881376	2015 HE_{2}	—	January 18, 2015	Haleakala	Pan-STARRS 1	THB	2.1 km	MPC · JPL
881377	2015 HA_{14}	—	March 17, 2015	Haleakala	Pan-STARRS 1	·	1.1 km	MPC · JPL
881378	2015 HL_{15}	—	April 16, 2015	Mount Lemmon	Mount Lemmon Survey	·	1.3 km	MPC · JPL
881379	2015 HG_{20}	—	March 23, 2015	Mount Lemmon	Mount Lemmon Survey	·	690 m	MPC · JPL
881380	2015 HN_{21}	—	February 23, 2015	Haleakala	Pan-STARRS 1	·	750 m	MPC · JPL
881381	2015 HM_{27}	—	April 20, 2015	Haleakala	Pan-STARRS 1	·	920 m	MPC · JPL
881382	2015 HZ_{31}	—	April 18, 2015	Mount Lemmon	Mount Lemmon Survey	·	950 m	MPC · JPL
881383	2015 HZ_{32}	—	January 8, 2011	Mount Lemmon	Mount Lemmon Survey	·	860 m	MPC · JPL
881384	2015 HJ_{38}	—	May 12, 2011	Mount Lemmon	Mount Lemmon Survey	EUN	750 m	MPC · JPL
881385	2015 HN_{39}	—	April 20, 2015	Haleakala	Pan-STARRS 1	T_{j} (2.98) · 3:2	4.5 km	MPC · JPL
881386	2015 HT_{43}	—	March 21, 2015	Haleakala	Pan-STARRS 1	·	650 m	MPC · JPL
881387	2015 HY_{43}	—	January 18, 2015	Haleakala	Pan-STARRS 1	·	2.6 km	MPC · JPL
881388	2015 HJ_{52}	—	April 16, 2015	Haleakala	Pan-STARRS 1	·	1.3 km	MPC · JPL
881389	2015 HX_{53}	—	April 22, 2009	Mount Lemmon	Mount Lemmon Survey	·	3.0 km	MPC · JPL
881390	2015 HM_{57}	—	April 18, 2015	Haleakala	Pan-STARRS 1	·	1.4 km	MPC · JPL
881391	2015 HO_{57}	—	January 23, 2006	Kitt Peak	Spacewatch	·	1 km	MPC · JPL
881392	2015 HZ_{62}	—	February 14, 2009	Catalina	CSS	T_{j} (2.97)	2.5 km	MPC · JPL
881393	2015 HK_{68}	—	March 18, 2015	Haleakala	Pan-STARRS 1	(5)	810 m	MPC · JPL
881394	2015 HH_{69}	—	April 19, 2015	Mount Lemmon	Mount Lemmon Survey	MIS	1.8 km	MPC · JPL
881395	2015 HV_{72}	—	April 19, 2015	Mount Lemmon	Mount Lemmon Survey	·	1.1 km	MPC · JPL
881396	2015 HP_{74}	—	April 23, 2015	Haleakala	Pan-STARRS 1	·	1.0 km	MPC · JPL
881397	2015 HM_{96}	—	April 23, 2015	Haleakala	Pan-STARRS 1	·	680 m	MPC · JPL
881398	2015 HC_{108}	—	April 6, 2011	Mount Lemmon	Mount Lemmon Survey	·	700 m	MPC · JPL
881399	2015 HP_{111}	—	March 28, 2015	Haleakala	Pan-STARRS 1	·	1.1 km	MPC · JPL
881400	2015 HK_{124}	—	September 20, 2003	Kitt Peak	Spacewatch	WIT	590 m	MPC · JPL

== 881401–881500 ==
back to top

Designation			Discovery			Properties		Ref
Permanent	Provisional	Named after	Date	Site	Discoverer(s)	Category	Diam.	Ref
881401	2015 HD_{126}	—	April 23, 2015	Haleakala	Pan-STARRS 1	MIS	1.8 km	MPC · JPL
881402	2015 HX_{127}	—	April 23, 2015	Haleakala	Pan-STARRS 1	·	780 m	MPC · JPL
881403	2015 HJ_{129}	—	March 18, 2015	Haleakala	Pan-STARRS 1	·	680 m	MPC · JPL
881404	2015 HO_{130}	—	March 21, 1999	Sacramento Peak	SDSS	·	2.3 km	MPC · JPL
881405	2015 HH_{146}	—	April 23, 2015	Haleakala	Pan-STARRS 1	·	1.3 km	MPC · JPL
881406	2015 HM_{151}	—	April 23, 2015	Haleakala	Pan-STARRS 1	·	1.1 km	MPC · JPL
881407	2015 HH_{153}	—	January 25, 2007	Kitt Peak	Spacewatch	·	770 m	MPC · JPL
881408	2015 HT_{155}	—	April 18, 2015	Haleakala	Pan-STARRS 1	JUN	870 m	MPC · JPL
881409	2015 HM_{161}	—	April 23, 2015	Haleakala	Pan-STARRS 1	·	890 m	MPC · JPL
881410	2015 HW_{162}	—	April 24, 2015	Haleakala	Pan-STARRS 1	·	940 m	MPC · JPL
881411	2015 HX_{165}	—	April 24, 2015	Haleakala	Pan-STARRS 1	·	970 m	MPC · JPL
881412	2015 HY_{165}	—	April 24, 2015	Haleakala	Pan-STARRS 1	·	1.1 km	MPC · JPL
881413	2015 HH_{173}	—	February 23, 2015	Haleakala	Pan-STARRS 1	·	1.1 km	MPC · JPL
881414	2015 HF_{176}	—	January 25, 2015	Haleakala	Pan-STARRS 1	·	880 m	MPC · JPL
881415	2015 HD_{185}	—	April 25, 2015	Haleakala	Pan-STARRS 1	·	1.1 km	MPC · JPL
881416	2015 HE_{185}	—	April 25, 2015	Haleakala	Pan-STARRS 1	·	1.2 km	MPC · JPL
881417	2015 HF_{190}	—	April 20, 2015	Haleakala	Pan-STARRS 1	·	1.9 km	MPC · JPL
881418	2015 HW_{192}	—	April 24, 2015	Haleakala	Pan-STARRS 1	·	1.2 km	MPC · JPL
881419	2015 HK_{193}	—	April 25, 2015	Haleakala	Pan-STARRS 1	·	1.1 km	MPC · JPL
881420	2015 HW_{193}	—	April 25, 2015	Haleakala	Pan-STARRS 1	·	1.1 km	MPC · JPL
881421	2015 HL_{201}	—	April 24, 2015	Haleakala	Pan-STARRS 1	·	900 m	MPC · JPL
881422	2015 HD_{204}	—	April 25, 2015	Haleakala	Pan-STARRS 1	·	970 m	MPC · JPL
881423	2015 HO_{204}	—	April 23, 2015	Haleakala	Pan-STARRS 1	·	970 m	MPC · JPL
881424	2015 HC_{205}	—	April 25, 2015	Haleakala	Pan-STARRS 1	·	990 m	MPC · JPL
881425	2015 HK_{205}	—	April 25, 2015	Haleakala	Pan-STARRS 1	·	1.2 km	MPC · JPL
881426	2015 HL_{205}	—	April 23, 2015	Haleakala	Pan-STARRS 1	·	710 m	MPC · JPL
881427	2015 HC_{206}	—	April 23, 2015	Haleakala	Pan-STARRS 1	·	1.0 km	MPC · JPL
881428	2015 HR_{207}	—	April 18, 2015	Haleakala	Pan-STARRS 1	·	2.3 km	MPC · JPL
881429	2015 HO_{212}	—	April 20, 2015	Haleakala	Pan-STARRS 1	·	1.3 km	MPC · JPL
881430	2015 HM_{213}	—	April 23, 2015	Haleakala	Pan-STARRS 1	·	1.3 km	MPC · JPL
881431	2015 HW_{213}	—	April 18, 2015	Haleakala	Pan-STARRS 1	·	1.3 km	MPC · JPL
881432	2015 HK_{214}	—	April 23, 2015	Haleakala	Pan-STARRS 1	3:2	3.3 km	MPC · JPL
881433	2015 HX_{214}	—	April 22, 2015	Mount Lemmon	Mount Lemmon Survey	T_{j} (2.97)	3.1 km	MPC · JPL
881434	2015 HG_{217}	—	April 24, 2015	Haleakala	Pan-STARRS 1	·	1.1 km	MPC · JPL
881435	2015 HS_{228}	—	April 20, 2015	Haleakala	Pan-STARRS 1	L4	5.8 km	MPC · JPL
881436	2015 HQ_{229}	—	March 17, 2015	Haleakala	Pan-STARRS 1	(17392)	1.1 km	MPC · JPL
881437	2015 HU_{238}	—	April 18, 2015	Cerro Tololo	DECam	T_{j} (2.99) · 3:2	4.3 km	MPC · JPL
881438	2015 HT_{241}	—	April 18, 2015	Cerro Tololo	DECam	·	800 m	MPC · JPL
881439	2015 HB_{250}	—	April 18, 2015	Cerro Tololo	DECam	KON	1.4 km	MPC · JPL
881440	2015 HM_{254}	—	April 20, 2015	Haleakala	Pan-STARRS 1	EUN	750 m	MPC · JPL
881441	2015 HN_{254}	—	April 17, 2015	Mount Lemmon	Mount Lemmon Survey	·	1.2 km	MPC · JPL
881442	2015 HB_{255}	—	April 20, 2015	Haleakala	Pan-STARRS 1	·	680 m	MPC · JPL
881443	2015 HE_{256}	—	April 25, 2015	Haleakala	Pan-STARRS 1	·	1.1 km	MPC · JPL
881444	2015 HW_{256}	—	April 17, 2015	Cerro Tololo	DECam	·	2.3 km	MPC · JPL
881445	2015 HX_{270}	—	April 18, 2015	Mount Lemmon	Mount Lemmon Survey	·	1.3 km	MPC · JPL
881446	2015 HJ_{285}	—	October 8, 2012	Mount Lemmon	Mount Lemmon Survey	·	1.3 km	MPC · JPL
881447	2015 HD_{288}	—	April 18, 2015	Cerro Tololo	DECam	EOS	1.3 km	MPC · JPL
881448	2015 HH_{291}	—	April 18, 2015	Cerro Tololo	DECam	·	1.5 km	MPC · JPL
881449	2015 HL_{295}	—	April 19, 2015	Cerro Tololo	DECam	EOS	1.3 km	MPC · JPL
881450	2015 HU_{295}	—	April 18, 2015	Cerro Tololo	DECam	EOS	1.0 km	MPC · JPL
881451	2015 HC_{297}	—	April 19, 2015	Cerro Tololo	DECam	·	1.7 km	MPC · JPL
881452	2015 HQ_{302}	—	April 18, 2015	Cerro Tololo	DECam	(260)	2.6 km	MPC · JPL
881453	2015 HS_{306}	—	April 19, 2015	Mount Lemmon	Mount Lemmon Survey	·	1.1 km	MPC · JPL
881454	2015 HV_{306}	—	April 21, 2015	Cerro Tololo	DECam	·	1.0 km	MPC · JPL
881455	2015 HG_{321}	—	August 29, 2016	Mount Lemmon	Mount Lemmon Survey	·	500 m	MPC · JPL
881456	2015 HL_{335}	—	April 18, 2015	Cerro Tololo	DECam	·	1.3 km	MPC · JPL
881457	2015 HC_{337}	—	April 18, 2015	Cerro Tololo	DECam	·	1.4 km	MPC · JPL
881458	2015 HU_{346}	—	April 18, 2015	Cerro Tololo	DECam	·	970 m	MPC · JPL
881459	2015 HK_{356}	—	April 18, 2015	Cerro Tololo	DECam	·	1.4 km	MPC · JPL
881460	2015 HC_{379}	—	April 25, 2015	Haleakala	Pan-STARRS 1	DOR	1.8 km	MPC · JPL
881461	2015 HF_{388}	—	April 18, 2015	Cerro Tololo	DECam	L4	6.0 km	MPC · JPL
881462	2015 HY_{474}	—	August 26, 2012	Haleakala	Pan-STARRS 1	·	850 m	MPC · JPL
881463	2015 JG_{16}	—	May 10, 2015	Mount Lemmon	Mount Lemmon Survey	·	1.3 km	MPC · JPL
881464	2015 JN_{17}	—	May 15, 2015	Haleakala	Pan-STARRS 1	·	950 m	MPC · JPL
881465	2015 JQ_{17}	—	April 8, 2006	Mount Lemmon	Mount Lemmon Survey	·	970 m	MPC · JPL
881466	2015 JV_{17}	—	May 14, 2015	Haleakala	Pan-STARRS 1	·	900 m	MPC · JPL
881467	2015 JE_{18}	—	May 15, 2015	Haleakala	Pan-STARRS 1	RAF	610 m	MPC · JPL
881468	2015 JP_{18}	—	May 2, 2015	Cerro Paranal	Gaia Ground Based Optical Tracking	critical	470 m	MPC · JPL
881469	2015 JO_{20}	—	May 10, 2015	Mount Lemmon	Mount Lemmon Survey	·	1.1 km	MPC · JPL
881470	2015 JT_{20}	—	May 12, 2015	Mount Lemmon	Mount Lemmon Survey	·	1.1 km	MPC · JPL
881471	2015 JG_{22}	—	May 13, 2015	Cerro Paranal	Gaia Ground Based Optical Tracking	MRX	630 m	MPC · JPL
881472	2015 KZ	—	February 23, 2015	Haleakala	Pan-STARRS 1	·	2.6 km	MPC · JPL
881473	2015 KD_{4}	—	April 1, 2015	Haleakala	Pan-STARRS 1	·	1.4 km	MPC · JPL
881474	2015 KU_{7}	—	April 23, 2015	Haleakala	Pan-STARRS 1	BRG	1.0 km	MPC · JPL
881475	2015 KC_{10}	—	May 18, 2015	Haleakala	Pan-STARRS 1	·	1.1 km	MPC · JPL
881476	2015 KU_{15}	—	April 2, 2009	Mount Lemmon	Mount Lemmon Survey	·	2.0 km	MPC · JPL
881477	2015 KC_{26}	—	May 11, 2015	Mount Lemmon	Mount Lemmon Survey	·	1.0 km	MPC · JPL
881478	2015 KX_{30}	—	February 9, 2010	Mount Lemmon	Mount Lemmon Survey	·	1.1 km	MPC · JPL
881479	2015 KV_{35}	—	April 23, 2015	Haleakala	Pan-STARRS 1	ADE	1.3 km	MPC · JPL
881480	2015 KH_{39}	—	May 15, 2015	Haleakala	Pan-STARRS 1	·	1.1 km	MPC · JPL
881481	2015 KT_{39}	—	May 20, 2015	Haleakala	Pan-STARRS 1	·	760 m	MPC · JPL
881482	2015 KB_{44}	—	May 20, 2015	Haleakala	Pan-STARRS 1	·	930 m	MPC · JPL
881483	2015 KW_{46}	—	May 20, 2015	Haleakala	Pan-STARRS 1	·	800 m	MPC · JPL
881484	2015 KM_{47}	—	September 23, 2011	Haleakala	Pan-STARRS 1	·	1.1 km	MPC · JPL
881485	2015 KY_{66}	—	April 25, 2015	Haleakala	Pan-STARRS 1	·	960 m	MPC · JPL
881486	2015 KQ_{71}	—	May 21, 2015	Haleakala	Pan-STARRS 1	·	1.8 km	MPC · JPL
881487	2015 KR_{74}	—	May 21, 2015	Haleakala	Pan-STARRS 1	HNS	800 m	MPC · JPL
881488	2015 KY_{74}	—	June 4, 2011	Mount Lemmon	Mount Lemmon Survey	·	950 m	MPC · JPL
881489	2015 KW_{77}	—	March 30, 2015	Haleakala	Pan-STARRS 1	·	940 m	MPC · JPL
881490	2015 KV_{80}	—	May 21, 2015	Haleakala	Pan-STARRS 1	·	1.0 km	MPC · JPL
881491	2015 KU_{81}	—	May 21, 2015	Haleakala	Pan-STARRS 1	·	1.2 km	MPC · JPL
881492	2015 KX_{81}	—	June 6, 2011	Mount Lemmon	Mount Lemmon Survey	·	800 m	MPC · JPL
881493	2015 KR_{82}	—	March 29, 2015	Haleakala	Pan-STARRS 1	·	760 m	MPC · JPL
881494	2015 KU_{91}	—	May 12, 2015	XuYi	PMO NEO Survey Program	·	1.1 km	MPC · JPL
881495	2015 KB_{94}	—	April 23, 2015	Haleakala	Pan-STARRS 1	EUN	870 m	MPC · JPL
881496	2015 KZ_{96}	—	May 21, 2015	Haleakala	Pan-STARRS 1	·	1.8 km	MPC · JPL
881497	2015 KT_{99}	—	May 21, 2015	Haleakala	Pan-STARRS 1	·	1.1 km	MPC · JPL
881498	2015 KV_{102}	—	May 21, 2015	Haleakala	Pan-STARRS 1	·	870 m	MPC · JPL
881499	2015 KU_{105}	—	May 21, 2015	Haleakala	Pan-STARRS 1	·	850 m	MPC · JPL
881500	2015 KQ_{107}	—	May 21, 2015	Haleakala	Pan-STARRS 1	·	1.1 km	MPC · JPL

== 881501–881600 ==
back to top

Designation			Discovery			Properties		Ref
Permanent	Provisional	Named after	Date	Site	Discoverer(s)	Category	Diam.	Ref
881501	2015 KD_{108}	—	March 31, 2015	Haleakala	Pan-STARRS 1	EUN	710 m	MPC · JPL
881502	2015 KO_{108}	—	March 30, 2015	Haleakala	Pan-STARRS 1	·	1.3 km	MPC · JPL
881503	2015 KV_{108}	—	May 21, 2015	Haleakala	Pan-STARRS 1	·	980 m	MPC · JPL
881504	2015 KL_{109}	—	May 21, 2015	Haleakala	Pan-STARRS 1	WIT	690 m	MPC · JPL
881505	2015 KS_{109}	—	May 21, 2015	Haleakala	Pan-STARRS 1	·	1.2 km	MPC · JPL
881506	2015 KX_{109}	—	May 21, 2015	Haleakala	Pan-STARRS 1	·	850 m	MPC · JPL
881507	2015 KU_{114}	—	May 21, 2015	Haleakala	Pan-STARRS 1	EUN	850 m	MPC · JPL
881508	2015 KO_{118}	—	March 28, 2015	Haleakala	Pan-STARRS 1	EUN	900 m	MPC · JPL
881509	2015 KH_{121}	—	March 16, 2012	Mount Lemmon	Mount Lemmon Survey	H	390 m	MPC · JPL
881510	2015 KY_{125}	—	April 25, 2015	Haleakala	Pan-STARRS 1	·	800 m	MPC · JPL
881511	2015 KC_{131}	—	May 22, 2015	Haleakala	Pan-STARRS 1	·	770 m	MPC · JPL
881512	2015 KS_{131}	—	May 22, 2015	Haleakala	Pan-STARRS 1	EUN	910 m	MPC · JPL
881513	2015 KU_{135}	—	April 20, 2015	Kitt Peak	Spacewatch	MAS	510 m	MPC · JPL
881514	2015 KU_{138}	—	May 18, 2015	Haleakala	Pan-STARRS 2	·	900 m	MPC · JPL
881515	2015 KA_{139}	—	May 24, 2015	Haleakala	Pan-STARRS 1	·	1.2 km	MPC · JPL
881516	2015 KL_{145}	—	March 22, 2015	Haleakala	Pan-STARRS 1	·	940 m	MPC · JPL
881517	2015 KY_{150}	—	April 19, 2015	Kitt Peak	Spacewatch	·	1.1 km	MPC · JPL
881518	2015 KK_{156}	—	April 29, 2015	Mount Lemmon	Mount Lemmon Survey	·	1.2 km	MPC · JPL
881519	2015 KK_{157}	—	May 30, 2015	Kitt Peak	Spacewatch	BAR	1.3 km	MPC · JPL
881520	2015 KU_{160}	—	May 13, 2015	Mount Lemmon	Mount Lemmon Survey	EUN	1.0 km	MPC · JPL
881521	2015 KV_{164}	—	May 21, 2015	Haleakala	Pan-STARRS 1	·	800 m	MPC · JPL
881522	2015 KH_{171}	—	May 25, 2015	Haleakala	Pan-STARRS 1	·	1.3 km	MPC · JPL
881523	2015 KA_{180}	—	May 20, 2015	Haleakala	Pan-STARRS 1	3:2	3.4 km	MPC · JPL
881524	2015 KC_{180}	—	May 22, 2015	Haleakala	Pan-STARRS 1	·	2.0 km	MPC · JPL
881525	2015 KR_{181}	—	May 24, 2015	Haleakala	Pan-STARRS 1	·	1.1 km	MPC · JPL
881526	2015 KE_{182}	—	May 18, 2015	Haleakala	Pan-STARRS 1	·	1.1 km	MPC · JPL
881527	2015 KP_{182}	—	May 22, 2015	Haleakala	Pan-STARRS 1	·	710 m	MPC · JPL
881528	2015 KT_{182}	—	May 22, 2015	Haleakala	Pan-STARRS 1	·	970 m	MPC · JPL
881529	2015 KU_{182}	—	May 24, 2015	Mount Lemmon	Mount Lemmon Survey	·	920 m	MPC · JPL
881530	2015 KK_{183}	—	March 30, 2015	Haleakala	Pan-STARRS 1	·	900 m	MPC · JPL
881531	2015 KY_{184}	—	May 22, 2015	Haleakala	Pan-STARRS 1	·	910 m	MPC · JPL
881532	2015 KC_{187}	—	May 22, 2015	Haleakala	Pan-STARRS 1	EUN	770 m	MPC · JPL
881533	2015 KL_{191}	—	May 21, 2015	Haleakala	Pan-STARRS 1	EUN	770 m	MPC · JPL
881534	2015 KM_{191}	—	May 21, 2015	Haleakala	Pan-STARRS 1	·	1.1 km	MPC · JPL
881535	2015 KY_{191}	—	May 21, 2015	Haleakala	Pan-STARRS 1	·	1.2 km	MPC · JPL
881536	2015 KJ_{192}	—	May 21, 2015	Haleakala	Pan-STARRS 1	·	1.0 km	MPC · JPL
881537	2015 KH_{196}	—	May 24, 2015	Haleakala	Pan-STARRS 1	JUN	720 m	MPC · JPL
881538	2015 KQ_{197}	—	May 24, 2015	Haleakala	Pan-STARRS 1	EUN	890 m	MPC · JPL
881539	2015 KC_{200}	—	May 21, 2015	Haleakala	Pan-STARRS 1	·	1 km	MPC · JPL
881540	2015 KP_{203}	—	May 22, 2015	Haleakala	Pan-STARRS 1	WIT	700 m	MPC · JPL
881541	2015 KX_{205}	—	May 18, 2015	Haleakala	Pan-STARRS 2	·	1.1 km	MPC · JPL
881542	2015 KG_{208}	—	May 21, 2015	Haleakala	Pan-STARRS 1	·	1.6 km	MPC · JPL
881543	2015 KL_{209}	—	May 21, 2015	Haleakala	Pan-STARRS 1	HNS	610 m	MPC · JPL
881544	2015 KB_{212}	—	August 12, 2016	Haleakala	Pan-STARRS 1	·	1.0 km	MPC · JPL
881545	2015 KJ_{212}	—	May 25, 2015	Mount Lemmon	Mount Lemmon Survey	·	1.2 km	MPC · JPL
881546	2015 KK_{227}	—	August 2, 2016	Haleakala	Pan-STARRS 1	·	880 m	MPC · JPL
881547	2015 KH_{241}	—	September 13, 2007	Mount Lemmon	Mount Lemmon Survey	·	1.2 km	MPC · JPL
881548	2015 KA_{251}	—	August 9, 2016	Haleakala	Pan-STARRS 1	EOS	1.1 km	MPC · JPL
881549	2015 KU_{255}	—	May 20, 2015	Cerro Tololo	DECam	·	1.1 km	MPC · JPL
881550	2015 KU_{258}	—	May 20, 2015	Cerro Tololo	DECam	EOS	1.1 km	MPC · JPL
881551	2015 KG_{263}	—	October 28, 2008	Mount Lemmon	Mount Lemmon Survey	·	830 m	MPC · JPL
881552	2015 KL_{284}	—	May 20, 2015	Cerro Tololo	DECam	·	1.0 km	MPC · JPL
881553	2015 KZ_{305}	—	August 1, 2016	Haleakala	Pan-STARRS 1	·	1.2 km	MPC · JPL
881554	2015 KC_{315}	—	August 1, 2016	Haleakala	Pan-STARRS 1	·	1.5 km	MPC · JPL
881555	2015 KN_{319}	—	May 20, 2015	Cerro Tololo	DECam	·	770 m	MPC · JPL
881556	2015 KK_{325}	—	May 20, 2015	Cerro Tololo	DECam	THM	1.7 km	MPC · JPL
881557	2015 KD_{327}	—	May 20, 2015	Cerro Tololo	DECam	·	1.3 km	MPC · JPL
881558	2015 KS_{361}	—	May 22, 2015	Haleakala	Pan-STARRS 1	·	1.2 km	MPC · JPL
881559	2015 KH_{362}	—	May 22, 2015	Haleakala	Pan-STARRS 1	·	1.1 km	MPC · JPL
881560	2015 KL_{362}	—	May 24, 2015	Haleakala	Pan-STARRS 1	RAF	760 m	MPC · JPL
881561	2015 KS_{371}	—	May 20, 2015	Cerro Tololo	DECam	·	1.6 km	MPC · JPL
881562	2015 KU_{373}	—	May 20, 2015	Cerro Tololo	DECam	·	900 m	MPC · JPL
881563	2015 KB_{392}	—	May 18, 2015	Haleakala	Pan-STARRS 1	TIN	630 m	MPC · JPL
881564	2015 KY_{404}	—	May 21, 2015	Cerro Tololo	DECam	·	1.9 km	MPC · JPL
881565	2015 KN_{409}	—	May 20, 2015	Cerro Tololo	DECam	3:2	3.3 km	MPC · JPL
881566	2015 KH_{437}	—	November 20, 2003	Kitt Peak	Spacewatch	·	1.1 km	MPC · JPL
881567	2015 KV_{455}	—	May 21, 2015	Cerro Tololo	DECam	L4	3.9 km	MPC · JPL
881568	2015 KL_{461}	—	May 17, 2015	Subaru Telescope,	Subaru Telescope	·	960 m	MPC · JPL
881569	2015 KM_{465}	—	October 19, 2012	Haleakala	Pan-STARRS 1	·	1.1 km	MPC · JPL
881570	2015 LC_{4}	—	March 30, 2015	Haleakala	Pan-STARRS 1	·	980 m	MPC · JPL
881571	2015 LU_{11}	—	July 18, 2006	Siding Spring	SSS	·	1.2 km	MPC · JPL
881572	2015 LF_{12}	—	May 22, 2015	Haleakala	Pan-STARRS 1	·	1.1 km	MPC · JPL
881573	2015 LW_{13}	—	March 30, 2015	Haleakala	Pan-STARRS 1	·	1.1 km	MPC · JPL
881574	2015 LE_{28}	—	June 13, 2015	Haleakala	Pan-STARRS 1	·	990 m	MPC · JPL
881575	2015 LB_{29}	—	June 13, 2015	Haleakala	Pan-STARRS 1	·	1.1 km	MPC · JPL
881576	2015 LC_{35}	—	June 22, 2006	Kitt Peak	Spacewatch	·	1.2 km	MPC · JPL
881577	2015 LM_{37}	—	March 21, 2015	Haleakala	Pan-STARRS 1	·	1.1 km	MPC · JPL
881578	2015 LP_{47}	—	June 15, 2015	Haleakala	Pan-STARRS 1	·	1.6 km	MPC · JPL
881579	2015 LU_{47}	—	June 13, 2015	Haleakala	Pan-STARRS 1	·	240 m	MPC · JPL
881580	2015 LH_{50}	—	September 21, 2011	Zelenchukskaya Stn	T. V. Krjačko, Satovski, B.	·	1.2 km	MPC · JPL
881581	2015 LO_{50}	—	June 11, 2015	Haleakala	Pan-STARRS 1	·	690 m	MPC · JPL
881582	2015 LA_{51}	—	June 7, 2015	Haleakala	Pan-STARRS 1	·	1.4 km	MPC · JPL
881583	2015 LQ_{52}	—	June 7, 2015	Haleakala	Pan-STARRS 1	·	1.1 km	MPC · JPL
881584	2015 LS_{52}	—	June 14, 2015	Mount Lemmon	Mount Lemmon Survey	·	1.1 km	MPC · JPL
881585	2015 LT_{52}	—	June 11, 2015	Haleakala	Pan-STARRS 1	·	1.1 km	MPC · JPL
881586	2015 LA_{54}	—	June 11, 2015	Haleakala	Pan-STARRS 1	·	1.3 km	MPC · JPL
881587	2015 LA_{55}	—	June 14, 2015	Mount Lemmon	Mount Lemmon Survey	EUN	800 m	MPC · JPL
881588	2015 LG_{55}	—	June 15, 2015	Haleakala	Pan-STARRS 1	·	890 m	MPC · JPL
881589	2015 LZ_{58}	—	June 13, 2015	Haleakala	Pan-STARRS 1	·	1.0 km	MPC · JPL
881590	2015 LM_{64}	—	June 15, 2015	Haleakala	Pan-STARRS 1	·	880 m	MPC · JPL
881591	2015 MO_{1}	—	June 17, 2015	Haleakala	Pan-STARRS 1	·	1.9 km	MPC · JPL
881592	2015 MH_{8}	—	June 16, 2015	Haleakala	Pan-STARRS 1	·	1.4 km	MPC · JPL
881593	2015 MC_{11}	—	June 16, 2015	Haleakala	Pan-STARRS 1	·	1.1 km	MPC · JPL
881594	2015 MT_{12}	—	December 23, 2012	Haleakala	Pan-STARRS 1	·	1.7 km	MPC · JPL
881595	2015 MA_{14}	—	May 25, 2015	Haleakala	Pan-STARRS 1	·	1.3 km	MPC · JPL
881596	2015 MJ_{17}	—	April 18, 2015	Haleakala	Pan-STARRS 1	·	1.0 km	MPC · JPL
881597	2015 MT_{17}	—	June 18, 2015	Haleakala	Pan-STARRS 1	·	1.1 km	MPC · JPL
881598	2015 ML_{18}	—	May 11, 2015	Mount Lemmon	Mount Lemmon Survey	MAR	700 m	MPC · JPL
881599	2015 MR_{18}	—	May 12, 2015	Mount Lemmon	Mount Lemmon Survey	·	1.0 km	MPC · JPL
881600	2015 ML_{20}	—	April 25, 2015	Haleakala	Pan-STARRS 1	MAR	650 m	MPC · JPL

== 881601–881700 ==
back to top

Designation			Discovery			Properties		Ref
Permanent	Provisional	Named after	Date	Site	Discoverer(s)	Category	Diam.	Ref
881601	2015 MG_{21}	—	May 19, 2015	Mount Lemmon	Mount Lemmon Survey	HNS	690 m	MPC · JPL
881602	2015 MN_{21}	—	May 10, 2015	Mount Lemmon	Mount Lemmon Survey	·	700 m	MPC · JPL
881603	2015 MH_{26}	—	May 25, 2015	Haleakala	Pan-STARRS 1	·	2.7 km	MPC · JPL
881604	2015 MS_{27}	—	May 12, 2015	Mount Lemmon	Mount Lemmon Survey	HNS	880 m	MPC · JPL
881605	2015 MG_{28}	—	June 18, 2015	Haleakala	Pan-STARRS 1	·	950 m	MPC · JPL
881606	2015 MT_{29}	—	June 18, 2015	Haleakala	Pan-STARRS 1	·	620 m	MPC · JPL
881607	2015 MO_{33}	—	June 5, 2011	Mount Lemmon	Mount Lemmon Survey	EUN	790 m	MPC · JPL
881608	2015 MX_{36}	—	March 21, 2015	Haleakala	Pan-STARRS 1	·	1.4 km	MPC · JPL
881609	2015 MZ_{38}	—	June 18, 2015	Haleakala	Pan-STARRS 1	HNS	770 m	MPC · JPL
881610	2015 MC_{39}	—	May 19, 2015	Haleakala	Pan-STARRS 1	·	1.5 km	MPC · JPL
881611	2015 MK_{39}	—	June 18, 2015	Haleakala	Pan-STARRS 1	·	890 m	MPC · JPL
881612	2015 MS_{48}	—	October 20, 2011	Mount Lemmon	Mount Lemmon Survey	·	1.1 km	MPC · JPL
881613	2015 MY_{50}	—	June 17, 2015	Haleakala	Pan-STARRS 1	·	480 m	MPC · JPL
881614	2015 ME_{56}	—	June 15, 2015	Haleakala	Pan-STARRS 1	EUN	830 m	MPC · JPL
881615	2015 MJ_{56}	—	May 21, 2015	Haleakala	Pan-STARRS 1	·	430 m	MPC · JPL
881616	2015 MC_{57}	—	May 18, 2010	WISE	WISE	·	3.0 km	MPC · JPL
881617	2015 MT_{58}	—	June 13, 2015	Haleakala	Pan-STARRS 1	·	1.3 km	MPC · JPL
881618	2015 ME_{70}	—	June 16, 2015	Haleakala	Pan-STARRS 1	·	2.0 km	MPC · JPL
881619	2015 MU_{71}	—	June 18, 2015	Haleakala	Pan-STARRS 1	·	1.4 km	MPC · JPL
881620	2015 MY_{71}	—	June 22, 2015	Haleakala	Pan-STARRS 1	·	2.2 km	MPC · JPL
881621	2015 MM_{80}	—	June 16, 2015	Haleakala	Pan-STARRS 1	·	460 m	MPC · JPL
881622	2015 MR_{83}	—	January 29, 2014	Kitt Peak	Spacewatch	EUN	860 m	MPC · JPL
881623	2015 MH_{84}	—	June 22, 2015	Haleakala	Pan-STARRS 1	·	1.0 km	MPC · JPL
881624	2015 MM_{92}	—	March 22, 2015	Haleakala	Pan-STARRS 1	·	1.5 km	MPC · JPL
881625	2015 MW_{94}	—	June 23, 2015	Haleakala	Pan-STARRS 1	·	1.5 km	MPC · JPL
881626	2015 MB_{95}	—	September 20, 2011	Haleakala	Pan-STARRS 1	·	1.5 km	MPC · JPL
881627	2015 MP_{95}	—	June 16, 2015	Haleakala	Pan-STARRS 1	JUN	840 m	MPC · JPL
881628	2015 MQ_{96}	—	June 25, 2015	Elena Remote	Oreshko, A.	·	1.7 km	MPC · JPL
881629	2015 MF_{101}	—	June 18, 2015	Haleakala	Pan-STARRS 1	·	1.3 km	MPC · JPL
881630	2015 MZ_{106}	—	June 20, 2015	Haleakala	Pan-STARRS 1	·	1.5 km	MPC · JPL
881631	2015 MG_{108}	—	June 26, 2015	Haleakala	Pan-STARRS 1	·	1.1 km	MPC · JPL
881632	2015 MB_{114}	—	June 27, 2015	Haleakala	Pan-STARRS 1	·	1.5 km	MPC · JPL
881633	2015 MN_{117}	—	September 24, 2011	Haleakala	Pan-STARRS 1	·	1.2 km	MPC · JPL
881634	2015 MH_{119}	—	June 27, 2015	Haleakala	Pan-STARRS 1	·	1.5 km	MPC · JPL
881635	2015 MW_{119}	—	June 27, 2015	Haleakala	Pan-STARRS 1	MAR	780 m	MPC · JPL
881636	2015 MA_{120}	—	November 19, 2011	Mount Lemmon	Mount Lemmon Survey	·	1.3 km	MPC · JPL
881637	2015 MW_{122}	—	June 27, 2015	Haleakala	Pan-STARRS 1	·	1.5 km	MPC · JPL
881638	2015 MY_{122}	—	June 27, 2015	Haleakala	Pan-STARRS 1	EUN	1.0 km	MPC · JPL
881639	2015 MA_{124}	—	June 28, 2015	Haleakala	Pan-STARRS 1	·	1.8 km	MPC · JPL
881640	2015 MK_{125}	—	December 21, 2008	Mount Lemmon	Mount Lemmon Survey	MAR	800 m	MPC · JPL
881641	2015 MJ_{128}	—	December 29, 2005	Mount Lemmon	Mount Lemmon Survey	·	850 m	MPC · JPL
881642	2015 MG_{129}	—	June 29, 2015	Haleakala	Pan-STARRS 1	·	660 m	MPC · JPL
881643	2015 MB_{131}	—	April 4, 2015	Haleakala	Pan-STARRS 1	·	2.0 km	MPC · JPL
881644	2015 ML_{132}	—	June 18, 2015	Haleakala	Pan-STARRS 1	DOR	1.4 km	MPC · JPL
881645	2015 MH_{133}	—	June 25, 2015	Haleakala	Pan-STARRS 1	·	1.4 km	MPC · JPL
881646	2015 MV_{133}	—	June 28, 2015	Haleakala	Pan-STARRS 1	MRX	730 m	MPC · JPL
881647	2015 MG_{139}	—	September 25, 2011	Haleakala	Pan-STARRS 1	·	1.4 km	MPC · JPL
881648	2015 MJ_{142}	—	September 30, 2011	Kitt Peak	Spacewatch	AEO	800 m	MPC · JPL
881649	2015 MP_{142}	—	October 18, 2011	Kitt Peak	Spacewatch	AEO	730 m	MPC · JPL
881650	2015 MP_{143}	—	June 22, 2015	Haleakala	Pan-STARRS 1	·	1.4 km	MPC · JPL
881651	2015 MU_{156}	—	June 24, 2015	Haleakala	Pan-STARRS 1	·	790 m	MPC · JPL
881652	2015 MJ_{157}	—	June 26, 2015	Haleakala	Pan-STARRS 1	·	1.2 km	MPC · JPL
881653	2015 MT_{157}	—	June 18, 2015	Haleakala	Pan-STARRS 1	·	1.1 km	MPC · JPL
881654	2015 MO_{159}	—	January 20, 2018	Mount Lemmon	Mount Lemmon Survey	HNS	800 m	MPC · JPL
881655	2015 ML_{161}	—	June 19, 2015	Haleakala	Pan-STARRS 1	JUN	600 m	MPC · JPL
881656	2015 MR_{163}	—	June 7, 2015	Haleakala	Pan-STARRS 1	·	1.2 km	MPC · JPL
881657	2015 MR_{164}	—	June 17, 2015	Haleakala	Pan-STARRS 1	·	1.8 km	MPC · JPL
881658	2015 MR_{166}	—	June 27, 2015	Haleakala	Pan-STARRS 1	·	1.3 km	MPC · JPL
881659	2015 MY_{166}	—	June 22, 2015	Haleakala	Pan-STARRS 1	·	1.5 km	MPC · JPL
881660	2015 MR_{167}	—	June 26, 2015	Haleakala	Pan-STARRS 1	DOR	1.7 km	MPC · JPL
881661	2015 MS_{168}	—	June 26, 2015	Haleakala	Pan-STARRS 1	·	1.4 km	MPC · JPL
881662	2015 MD_{169}	—	June 22, 2015	Haleakala	Pan-STARRS 2	·	1.3 km	MPC · JPL
881663	2015 MK_{169}	—	June 22, 2015	Haleakala	Pan-STARRS 1	·	1.0 km	MPC · JPL
881664	2015 MY_{170}	—	June 27, 2015	Haleakala	Pan-STARRS 1	·	1.4 km	MPC · JPL
881665	2015 MA_{171}	—	June 18, 2015	Haleakala	Pan-STARRS 1	·	1.3 km	MPC · JPL
881666	2015 MN_{171}	—	June 27, 2015	Haleakala	Pan-STARRS 1	·	1.4 km	MPC · JPL
881667	2015 MX_{171}	—	June 20, 2015	Haleakala	Pan-STARRS 1	·	1.1 km	MPC · JPL
881668	2015 ME_{174}	—	June 26, 2015	Haleakala	Pan-STARRS 1	·	920 m	MPC · JPL
881669	2015 MF_{176}	—	June 24, 2015	Haleakala	Pan-STARRS 1	·	2.0 km	MPC · JPL
881670	2015 MX_{182}	—	June 26, 2015	Haleakala	Pan-STARRS 1	·	1.7 km	MPC · JPL
881671	2015 MH_{194}	—	June 26, 2015	Haleakala	Pan-STARRS 1	·	1.2 km	MPC · JPL
881672	2015 MS_{196}	—	June 20, 2015	Haleakala	Pan-STARRS 1	·	1.2 km	MPC · JPL
881673	2015 MX_{203}	—	June 24, 2015	Haleakala	Pan-STARRS 1	TIN	750 m	MPC · JPL
881674	2015 NZ_{1}	—	June 18, 2015	Haleakala	Pan-STARRS 1	(194)	1.1 km	MPC · JPL
881675	2015 NV_{5}	—	July 8, 2015	Haleakala	Pan-STARRS 1	·	1.8 km	MPC · JPL
881676	2015 NM_{6}	—	June 23, 2015	Haleakala	Pan-STARRS 1	HNS	830 m	MPC · JPL
881677	2015 NL_{23}	—	July 12, 2015	Haleakala	Pan-STARRS 1	·	940 m	MPC · JPL
881678	2015 NS_{24}	—	June 20, 2015	Haleakala	Pan-STARRS 2	BAR	1.2 km	MPC · JPL
881679	2015 NC_{26}	—	July 12, 2015	Haleakala	Pan-STARRS 1	·	1.5 km	MPC · JPL
881680	2015 ND_{26}	—	July 12, 2015	Haleakala	Pan-STARRS 1	·	1.3 km	MPC · JPL
881681	2015 NF_{26}	—	July 14, 2015	Haleakala	Pan-STARRS 1	EUN	890 m	MPC · JPL
881682	2015 NK_{29}	—	July 9, 2015	Haleakala	Pan-STARRS 1	·	1.0 km	MPC · JPL
881683	2015 NY_{29}	—	July 12, 2015	Haleakala	Pan-STARRS 1	·	1.5 km	MPC · JPL
881684	2015 NT_{30}	—	July 9, 2015	Haleakala	Pan-STARRS 1	·	1.2 km	MPC · JPL
881685	2015 NE_{31}	—	July 12, 2015	Haleakala	Pan-STARRS 1	·	1.4 km	MPC · JPL
881686	2015 NU_{32}	—	July 14, 2015	Haleakala	Pan-STARRS 1	·	1.5 km	MPC · JPL
881687	2015 NY_{33}	—	July 12, 2015	Haleakala	Pan-STARRS 1	·	1.6 km	MPC · JPL
881688	2015 NW_{38}	—	July 12, 2015	Haleakala	Pan-STARRS 1	·	1.7 km	MPC · JPL
881689	2015 OX_{3}	—	June 12, 2015	Mount Lemmon	Mount Lemmon Survey	EUN	840 m	MPC · JPL
881690	2015 OL_{6}	—	July 18, 2015	Haleakala	Pan-STARRS 1	·	1.2 km	MPC · JPL
881691	2015 OZ_{9}	—	June 16, 2015	Haleakala	Pan-STARRS 1	·	1.7 km	MPC · JPL
881692	2015 ON_{10}	—	October 20, 2011	Mount Lemmon	Mount Lemmon Survey	MRX	730 m	MPC · JPL
881693	2015 OT_{20}	—	July 18, 2015	Haleakala	Pan-STARRS 1	·	1.7 km	MPC · JPL
881694	2015 OM_{26}	—	June 27, 2015	Haleakala	Pan-STARRS 1	·	1.3 km	MPC · JPL
881695	2015 ON_{30}	—	October 30, 2011	Kitt Peak	Spacewatch	MIS	1.6 km	MPC · JPL
881696	2015 OP_{30}	—	July 23, 2015	Haleakala	Pan-STARRS 2	·	570 m	MPC · JPL
881697	2015 OA_{34}	—	July 19, 2015	Haleakala	Pan-STARRS 2	LIX	2.5 km	MPC · JPL
881698	2015 OA_{38}	—	June 25, 2015	Haleakala	Pan-STARRS 1	·	1.3 km	MPC · JPL
881699	2015 OE_{38}	—	June 25, 2015	Haleakala	Pan-STARRS 1	H	390 m	MPC · JPL
881700	2015 OG_{44}	—	October 3, 2011	Piszkéstető	K. Sárneczky	·	1.3 km	MPC · JPL

== 881701–881800 ==
back to top

Designation			Discovery			Properties		Ref
Permanent	Provisional	Named after	Date	Site	Discoverer(s)	Category	Diam.	Ref
881701	2015 OA_{45}	—	July 24, 2015	Haleakala	Pan-STARRS 1	EUN	880 m	MPC · JPL
881702	2015 OB_{45}	—	September 7, 2004	Kitt Peak	Spacewatch	·	960 m	MPC · JPL
881703	2015 OF_{46}	—	July 24, 2015	Haleakala	Pan-STARRS 1	·	430 m	MPC · JPL
881704	2015 OP_{48}	—	July 26, 2015	Haleakala	Pan-STARRS 1	TIN	720 m	MPC · JPL
881705	2015 OP_{49}	—	July 26, 2015	Haleakala	Pan-STARRS 1	·	1.5 km	MPC · JPL
881706	2015 OL_{54}	—	July 26, 2015	Haleakala	Pan-STARRS 1	·	1.3 km	MPC · JPL
881707	2015 OH_{55}	—	July 26, 2015	Haleakala	Pan-STARRS 1	·	1.6 km	MPC · JPL
881708	2015 OC_{57}	—	September 19, 2007	Kitt Peak	Spacewatch	H	370 m	MPC · JPL
881709	2015 OB_{65}	—	July 26, 2015	Haleakala	Pan-STARRS 1	H	320 m	MPC · JPL
881710	2015 OF_{71}	—	October 27, 2011	Mount Lemmon	Mount Lemmon Survey	·	1.3 km	MPC · JPL
881711	2015 OD_{76}	—	September 5, 1994	La Silla	E. W. Elst	·	2.0 km	MPC · JPL
881712	2015 OH_{80}	—	July 25, 2015	Haleakala	Pan-STARRS 1	H	250 m	MPC · JPL
881713	2015 OJ_{81}	—	July 26, 2015	Haleakala	Pan-STARRS 1	H	270 m	MPC · JPL
881714	2015 OU_{81}	—	July 19, 2015	Haleakala	Pan-STARRS 1	·	1.2 km	MPC · JPL
881715	2015 OB_{82}	—	July 23, 2015	Haleakala	Pan-STARRS 1	·	1.2 km	MPC · JPL
881716	2015 OD_{83}	—	July 25, 2015	Haleakala	Pan-STARRS 1	·	1.4 km	MPC · JPL
881717	2015 OT_{83}	—	July 26, 2015	Haleakala	Pan-STARRS 1	·	1.3 km	MPC · JPL
881718	2015 OX_{85}	—	July 19, 2015	Haleakala	Pan-STARRS 1	·	1.4 km	MPC · JPL
881719	2015 OK_{89}	—	April 21, 2014	Mount Lemmon	Mount Lemmon Survey	EUN	880 m	MPC · JPL
881720	2015 OH_{90}	—	August 28, 2005	Kitt Peak	Spacewatch	KOR	1.1 km	MPC · JPL
881721	2015 OR_{93}	—	July 19, 2015	Haleakala	Pan-STARRS 1	·	1.6 km	MPC · JPL
881722	2015 OU_{93}	—	October 22, 2011	Mount Lemmon	Mount Lemmon Survey	·	1.3 km	MPC · JPL
881723	2015 OT_{94}	—	July 23, 2015	Haleakala	Pan-STARRS 1	·	1.2 km	MPC · JPL
881724	2015 OJ_{107}	—	July 25, 2015	Haleakala	Pan-STARRS 1	·	1.2 km	MPC · JPL
881725	2015 OU_{107}	—	July 25, 2015	Haleakala	Pan-STARRS 1	·	1.1 km	MPC · JPL
881726	2015 OV_{107}	—	July 23, 2015	Haleakala	Pan-STARRS 1	·	1.5 km	MPC · JPL
881727	2015 OW_{108}	—	July 23, 2015	Haleakala	Pan-STARRS 1	JUN	720 m	MPC · JPL
881728	2015 OS_{110}	—	September 1, 2005	Palomar	NEAT	T_{j} (2.82)	4.0 km	MPC · JPL
881729	2015 OZ_{110}	—	July 24, 2015	Haleakala	Pan-STARRS 1	·	470 m	MPC · JPL
881730	2015 OP_{112}	—	July 24, 2015	Haleakala	Pan-STARRS 1	·	770 m	MPC · JPL
881731	2015 OG_{113}	—	July 25, 2015	Haleakala	Pan-STARRS 1	·	1.6 km	MPC · JPL
881732	2015 OA_{114}	—	July 28, 2015	Haleakala	Pan-STARRS 1	H	330 m	MPC · JPL
881733	2015 OE_{115}	—	July 23, 2015	Haleakala	Pan-STARRS 2	·	1.9 km	MPC · JPL
881734	2015 OR_{115}	—	July 19, 2015	Haleakala	Pan-STARRS 2	·	1.4 km	MPC · JPL
881735	2015 OG_{116}	—	July 25, 2015	Haleakala	Pan-STARRS 1	·	1.4 km	MPC · JPL
881736	2015 OP_{116}	—	July 19, 2015	Haleakala	Pan-STARRS 2	H	340 m	MPC · JPL
881737	2015 OQ_{116}	—	July 25, 2015	Haleakala	Pan-STARRS 1	H	380 m	MPC · JPL
881738	2015 OU_{116}	—	July 24, 2015	Haleakala	Pan-STARRS 1	·	1.4 km	MPC · JPL
881739	2015 OL_{118}	—	July 25, 2015	Haleakala	Pan-STARRS 1	·	1.2 km	MPC · JPL
881740	2015 OX_{126}	—	July 19, 2015	Haleakala	Pan-STARRS 1	·	1.0 km	MPC · JPL
881741	2015 OC_{130}	—	July 19, 2015	Haleakala	Pan-STARRS 2	·	1.4 km	MPC · JPL
881742	2015 OU_{131}	—	July 25, 2015	Haleakala	Pan-STARRS 1	·	1.2 km	MPC · JPL
881743	2015 OH_{132}	—	July 23, 2015	Haleakala	Pan-STARRS 1	·	1.2 km	MPC · JPL
881744	2015 OO_{132}	—	July 24, 2015	Haleakala	Pan-STARRS 1	·	1.4 km	MPC · JPL
881745	2015 OP_{132}	—	July 24, 2015	Haleakala	Pan-STARRS 1	KOR	1.1 km	MPC · JPL
881746	2015 OO_{133}	—	July 19, 2015	Haleakala	Pan-STARRS 1	DOR	1.3 km	MPC · JPL
881747	2015 OS_{135}	—	July 23, 2015	Haleakala	Pan-STARRS 1	·	1.1 km	MPC · JPL
881748	2015 ON_{137}	—	July 19, 2015	Haleakala	Pan-STARRS 1	·	1.2 km	MPC · JPL
881749	2015 OV_{138}	—	July 25, 2015	Haleakala	Pan-STARRS 1	·	1.2 km	MPC · JPL
881750	2015 ON_{140}	—	July 24, 2015	Haleakala	Pan-STARRS 1	·	1.4 km	MPC · JPL
881751	2015 OJ_{141}	—	July 25, 2015	Haleakala	Pan-STARRS 1	·	1.2 km	MPC · JPL
881752	2015 OW_{143}	—	July 23, 2015	Haleakala	Pan-STARRS 1	·	1.4 km	MPC · JPL
881753	2015 OV_{144}	—	July 25, 2015	Haleakala	Pan-STARRS 1	EUN	680 m	MPC · JPL
881754	2015 OG_{145}	—	July 28, 2015	Haleakala	Pan-STARRS 1	·	1.1 km	MPC · JPL
881755	2015 OS_{145}	—	July 28, 2015	Haleakala	Pan-STARRS 1	H	280 m	MPC · JPL
881756	2015 OH_{163}	—	July 23, 2015	Haleakala	Pan-STARRS 1	·	1.2 km	MPC · JPL
881757	2015 OJ_{163}	—	July 24, 2015	Haleakala	Pan-STARRS 1	·	1.1 km	MPC · JPL
881758	2015 OM_{164}	—	February 2, 2009	Catalina	CSS	H	480 m	MPC · JPL
881759	2015 OW_{165}	—	July 25, 2015	Haleakala	Pan-STARRS 1	·	1.7 km	MPC · JPL
881760	2015 OT_{180}	—	July 24, 2015	Haleakala	Pan-STARRS 1	·	1.3 km	MPC · JPL
881761	2015 OF_{185}	—	July 25, 2015	Haleakala	Pan-STARRS 1	·	1.4 km	MPC · JPL
881762	2015 PE	—	August 1, 2011	Haleakala	Pan-STARRS 1	BAR	1 km	MPC · JPL
881763	2015 PD_{3}	—	July 27, 2015	Haleakala	Pan-STARRS 1	·	1.0 km	MPC · JPL
881764	2015 PH_{4}	—	July 11, 2015	Haleakala	Pan-STARRS 1	·	1.4 km	MPC · JPL
881765	2015 PP_{15}	—	August 3, 2015	Haleakala	Pan-STARRS 1	·	1.1 km	MPC · JPL
881766	2015 PS_{15}	—	June 13, 2015	Haleakala	Pan-STARRS 1	RAF	660 m	MPC · JPL
881767	2015 PX_{16}	—	October 19, 2011	Mount Lemmon	Mount Lemmon Survey	·	1.1 km	MPC · JPL
881768	2015 PH_{19}	—	August 8, 2015	Haleakala	Pan-STARRS 1	·	2.0 km	MPC · JPL
881769	2015 PP_{20}	—	August 8, 2015	Haleakala	Pan-STARRS 1	·	1.3 km	MPC · JPL
881770	2015 PV_{23}	—	August 8, 2015	Haleakala	Pan-STARRS 1	·	1.1 km	MPC · JPL
881771	2015 PS_{25}	—	July 25, 2015	Haleakala	Pan-STARRS 1	·	1.2 km	MPC · JPL
881772	2015 PU_{25}	—	September 28, 2011	Mount Lemmon	Mount Lemmon Survey	·	1.1 km	MPC · JPL
881773	2015 PU_{31}	—	June 27, 2015	Haleakala	Pan-STARRS 1	·	1.1 km	MPC · JPL
881774	2015 PD_{33}	—	August 8, 2015	Haleakala	Pan-STARRS 1	·	1.3 km	MPC · JPL
881775	2015 PE_{33}	—	August 8, 2015	Haleakala	Pan-STARRS 1	·	1.1 km	MPC · JPL
881776	2015 PP_{33}	—	October 19, 2006	Kitt Peak	Spacewatch	·	1.3 km	MPC · JPL
881777	2015 PU_{36}	—	July 12, 2015	Haleakala	Pan-STARRS 1	·	2.3 km	MPC · JPL
881778	2015 PP_{39}	—	July 28, 2015	Haleakala	Pan-STARRS 1	·	1.3 km	MPC · JPL
881779	2015 PU_{50}	—	August 9, 2015	Haleakala	Pan-STARRS 1	JUN	730 m	MPC · JPL
881780	2015 PO_{61}	—	June 25, 2015	Haleakala	Pan-STARRS 1	·	1.8 km	MPC · JPL
881781	2015 PK_{69}	—	January 2, 2009	Kitt Peak	Spacewatch	·	1.4 km	MPC · JPL
881782	2015 PP_{71}	—	September 20, 2011	Kitt Peak	Spacewatch	·	1.0 km	MPC · JPL
881783	2015 PJ_{75}	—	August 10, 2015	Haleakala	Pan-STARRS 1	KOR	830 m	MPC · JPL
881784	2015 PL_{75}	—	July 19, 2015	Haleakala	Pan-STARRS 1	·	1.3 km	MPC · JPL
881785	2015 PN_{81}	—	September 21, 2011	Kitt Peak	Spacewatch	AEO	860 m	MPC · JPL
881786	2015 PD_{85}	—	December 31, 2008	Kitt Peak	Spacewatch	·	1.3 km	MPC · JPL
881787	2015 PS_{88}	—	June 27, 2015	Haleakala	Pan-STARRS 2	·	1.5 km	MPC · JPL
881788	2015 PK_{96}	—	August 10, 2015	Haleakala	Pan-STARRS 1	·	1.5 km	MPC · JPL
881789	2015 PR_{97}	—	October 23, 2011	Mount Lemmon	Mount Lemmon Survey	·	1.1 km	MPC · JPL
881790	2015 PF_{102}	—	August 10, 2015	Haleakala	Pan-STARRS 1	WIT	690 m	MPC · JPL
881791	2015 PX_{109}	—	August 10, 2015	Haleakala	Pan-STARRS 1	EUN	790 m	MPC · JPL
881792	2015 PY_{112}	—	August 10, 2015	Haleakala	Pan-STARRS 1	3:2 · SHU	3.5 km	MPC · JPL
881793	2015 PE_{113}	—	October 24, 2011	Mount Lemmon	Mount Lemmon Survey	·	1.1 km	MPC · JPL
881794	2015 PV_{121}	—	July 25, 2015	Haleakala	Pan-STARRS 1	·	1.4 km	MPC · JPL
881795	2015 PK_{122}	—	August 10, 2015	Haleakala	Pan-STARRS 1	·	1.1 km	MPC · JPL
881796	2015 PJ_{126}	—	July 25, 2015	Haleakala	Pan-STARRS 1	·	1.1 km	MPC · JPL
881797	2015 PX_{131}	—	August 10, 2015	Haleakala	Pan-STARRS 1	·	1.4 km	MPC · JPL
881798	2015 PV_{141}	—	February 9, 2008	Mount Lemmon	Mount Lemmon Survey	·	1.1 km	MPC · JPL
881799	2015 PO_{142}	—	August 10, 2015	Haleakala	Pan-STARRS 1	DOR	1.7 km	MPC · JPL
881800	2015 PO_{157}	—	September 24, 2011	Haleakala	Pan-STARRS 1	·	1.2 km	MPC · JPL

== 881801–881900 ==
back to top

Designation			Discovery			Properties		Ref
Permanent	Provisional	Named after	Date	Site	Discoverer(s)	Category	Diam.	Ref
881801	2015 PU_{158}	—	July 24, 2015	Haleakala	Pan-STARRS 1	·	1.1 km	MPC · JPL
881802	2015 PF_{159}	—	June 17, 2015	Haleakala	Pan-STARRS 1	MRX	660 m	MPC · JPL
881803	2015 PR_{164}	—	August 10, 2015	Haleakala	Pan-STARRS 1	PAD	1.0 km	MPC · JPL
881804	2015 PG_{165}	—	October 23, 2011	Mount Lemmon	Mount Lemmon Survey	·	1.2 km	MPC · JPL
881805	2015 PW_{166}	—	August 10, 2015	Haleakala	Pan-STARRS 1	·	1.3 km	MPC · JPL
881806	2015 PU_{169}	—	February 22, 2014	Kitt Peak	Spacewatch	·	840 m	MPC · JPL
881807	2015 PX_{169}	—	April 4, 2014	Haleakala	Pan-STARRS 1	·	940 m	MPC · JPL
881808	2015 PA_{174}	—	July 19, 2015	Haleakala	Pan-STARRS 2	BRA	1.3 km	MPC · JPL
881809	2015 PC_{177}	—	October 23, 2011	Haleakala	Pan-STARRS 1	·	1.2 km	MPC · JPL
881810	2015 PH_{177}	—	January 16, 2013	Haleakala	Pan-STARRS 1	HOF	1.9 km	MPC · JPL
881811	2015 PU_{177}	—	April 5, 2014	Haleakala	Pan-STARRS 1	AGN	800 m	MPC · JPL
881812	2015 PM_{186}	—	July 24, 2015	Haleakala	Pan-STARRS 1	·	1.1 km	MPC · JPL
881813	2015 PL_{193}	—	November 5, 2011	Haleakala	Pan-STARRS 1	·	1.2 km	MPC · JPL
881814	2015 PF_{197}	—	June 25, 2015	Haleakala	Pan-STARRS 1	·	1.1 km	MPC · JPL
881815	2015 PC_{199}	—	July 12, 2015	Haleakala	Pan-STARRS 1	EUN	900 m	MPC · JPL
881816	2015 PM_{201}	—	July 24, 2015	Haleakala	Pan-STARRS 1	·	820 m	MPC · JPL
881817	2015 PG_{205}	—	October 26, 2011	Haleakala	Pan-STARRS 1	·	1.4 km	MPC · JPL
881818	2015 PL_{207}	—	September 24, 2011	Haleakala	Pan-STARRS 1	·	1.3 km	MPC · JPL
881819	2015 PB_{211}	—	April 5, 2014	Haleakala	Pan-STARRS 1	·	1.6 km	MPC · JPL
881820	2015 PF_{213}	—	November 11, 2006	Kitt Peak	Spacewatch	·	1.5 km	MPC · JPL
881821	2015 PQ_{217}	—	October 24, 2011	Haleakala	Pan-STARRS 1	·	1.5 km	MPC · JPL
881822	2015 PE_{219}	—	May 5, 2014	Haleakala	Pan-STARRS 1	EUN	960 m	MPC · JPL
881823	2015 PF_{227}	—	July 25, 2015	Haleakala	Pan-STARRS 1	·	1.3 km	MPC · JPL
881824	2015 PY_{229}	—	October 5, 2002	Sacramento Peak	SDSS	·	1.2 km	MPC · JPL
881825	2015 PX_{234}	—	October 26, 2011	Zelenchukskaya	T. V. Krjačko, B. Satovski	·	1.0 km	MPC · JPL
881826	2015 PK_{239}	—	January 10, 2008	Kitt Peak	Spacewatch	·	1.2 km	MPC · JPL
881827	2015 PC_{241}	—	August 10, 2015	Haleakala	Pan-STARRS 1	·	1.3 km	MPC · JPL
881828	2015 PF_{243}	—	December 22, 2012	Haleakala	Pan-STARRS 1	HNS	780 m	MPC · JPL
881829	2015 PV_{250}	—	August 10, 2015	Haleakala	Pan-STARRS 1	·	1.9 km	MPC · JPL
881830	2015 PN_{253}	—	November 15, 2011	Mount Lemmon	Mount Lemmon Survey	·	990 m	MPC · JPL
881831	2015 PZ_{253}	—	August 10, 2015	Haleakala	Pan-STARRS 1	·	1.3 km	MPC · JPL
881832	2015 PD_{255}	—	October 21, 2011	Haleakala	Pan-STARRS 1	·	1.1 km	MPC · JPL
881833	2015 PB_{257}	—	June 26, 2015	Haleakala	Pan-STARRS 1	·	910 m	MPC · JPL
881834	2015 PL_{268}	—	August 11, 2015	Haleakala	Pan-STARRS 1	·	1.8 km	MPC · JPL
881835	2015 PQ_{283}	—	August 12, 2015	Haleakala	Pan-STARRS 1	·	1.4 km	MPC · JPL
881836	2015 PK_{286}	—	July 24, 2015	Haleakala	Pan-STARRS 1	·	1.4 km	MPC · JPL
881837	2015 PQ_{289}	—	May 4, 2014	Haleakala	Pan-STARRS 1	·	2.2 km	MPC · JPL
881838	2015 PP_{293}	—	July 25, 2015	Haleakala	Pan-STARRS 1	·	1.4 km	MPC · JPL
881839	2015 PB_{295}	—	September 27, 2006	Mount Lemmon	Mount Lemmon Survey	·	1.2 km	MPC · JPL
881840	2015 PX_{303}	—	August 13, 2015	Haleakala	Pan-STARRS 1	·	1.3 km	MPC · JPL
881841	2015 PA_{306}	—	October 20, 2006	Kitt Peak	Spacewatch	GEF	890 m	MPC · JPL
881842	2015 PH_{313}	—	September 15, 2006	Kitt Peak	Spacewatch	AGN	820 m	MPC · JPL
881843	2015 PL_{314}	—	August 9, 2015	Haleakala	Pan-STARRS 1	·	1.2 km	MPC · JPL
881844	2015 PM_{314}	—	October 26, 2011	Haleakala	Pan-STARRS 1	AEO	680 m	MPC · JPL
881845	2015 PP_{314}	—	October 28, 2006	Mount Lemmon	Mount Lemmon Survey	KOR · critical	950 m	MPC · JPL
881846	2015 PA_{317}	—	September 23, 2011	Haleakala	Pan-STARRS 1	·	1.2 km	MPC · JPL
881847	2015 PS_{318}	—	August 9, 2015	Haleakala	Pan-STARRS 1	KOR	1.0 km	MPC · JPL
881848	2015 PV_{318}	—	November 24, 2011	Haleakala	Pan-STARRS 1	·	970 m	MPC · JPL
881849	2015 PR_{321}	—	November 24, 2011	Mount Lemmon	Mount Lemmon Survey	·	1.4 km	MPC · JPL
881850	2015 PR_{326}	—	August 14, 2015	Haleakala	Pan-STARRS 1	NYS	600 m	MPC · JPL
881851	2015 PM_{336}	—	August 9, 2015	Haleakala	Pan-STARRS 1	·	1.4 km	MPC · JPL
881852	2015 PO_{337}	—	August 9, 2015	Haleakala	Pan-STARRS 1	615	840 m	MPC · JPL
881853	2015 PV_{337}	—	August 8, 2015	Westfield	International Astronomical Search Collaboration	·	1.2 km	MPC · JPL
881854	2015 PX_{337}	—	August 14, 2015	Haleakala	Pan-STARRS 1	KOR	890 m	MPC · JPL
881855	2015 PN_{339}	—	August 7, 2015	Haleakala	Pan-STARRS 1	DOR	1.4 km	MPC · JPL
881856	2015 PV_{339}	—	August 11, 2015	Haleakala	Pan-STARRS 1	·	1.2 km	MPC · JPL
881857	2015 PP_{340}	—	August 9, 2015	Haleakala	Pan-STARRS 1	·	1.1 km	MPC · JPL
881858	2015 PU_{340}	—	August 12, 2015	Haleakala	Pan-STARRS 1	·	1.2 km	MPC · JPL
881859	2015 PT_{341}	—	August 12, 2015	Haleakala	Pan-STARRS 1	·	1.6 km	MPC · JPL
881860	2015 PO_{360}	—	August 14, 2015	Haleakala	Pan-STARRS 1	·	1.1 km	MPC · JPL
881861	2015 PX_{371}	—	August 13, 2015	Haleakala	Pan-STARRS 1	critical	1.1 km	MPC · JPL
881862	2015 QP	—	June 27, 2015	Haleakala	Pan-STARRS 1	·	840 m	MPC · JPL
881863	2015 QY_{2}	—	June 27, 2015	Haleakala	Pan-STARRS 1	·	1.3 km	MPC · JPL
881864	2015 QG_{12}	—	August 21, 2015	Haleakala	Pan-STARRS 1	·	1.5 km	MPC · JPL
881865	2015 QN_{12}	—	August 21, 2015	Haleakala	Pan-STARRS 1	critical	1.1 km	MPC · JPL
881866	2015 QB_{13}	—	August 18, 2015	Kitt Peak	Spacewatch	·	1.5 km	MPC · JPL
881867	2015 QT_{14}	—	August 20, 2015	Kitt Peak	Spacewatch	KOR	950 m	MPC · JPL
881868	2015 QZ_{15}	—	September 16, 2006	Kitt Peak	Spacewatch	AEO	730 m	MPC · JPL
881869	2015 QY_{17}	—	August 21, 2015	Haleakala	Pan-STARRS 1	·	1.7 km	MPC · JPL
881870	2015 QY_{19}	—	August 21, 2015	Haleakala	Pan-STARRS 1	·	1.1 km	MPC · JPL
881871	2015 QN_{21}	—	August 21, 2015	Haleakala	Pan-STARRS 1	EUN	820 m	MPC · JPL
881872	2015 QA_{23}	—	August 21, 2015	Haleakala	Pan-STARRS 1	·	730 m	MPC · JPL
881873	2015 QX_{28}	—	August 21, 2015	Haleakala	Pan-STARRS 1	·	1.4 km	MPC · JPL
881874	2015 QB_{29}	—	August 21, 2015	Haleakala	Pan-STARRS 1	PAD	1.1 km	MPC · JPL
881875	2015 QE_{30}	—	August 20, 2015	Kitt Peak	Spacewatch	·	1.3 km	MPC · JPL
881876	2015 QQ_{30}	—	August 21, 2015	Haleakala	Pan-STARRS 1	·	890 m	MPC · JPL
881877	2015 QT_{34}	—	August 21, 2015	Haleakala	Pan-STARRS 1	·	840 m	MPC · JPL
881878	2015 QP_{38}	—	August 19, 2015	Kitt Peak	Spacewatch	AST	1.3 km	MPC · JPL
881879	2015 QP_{42}	—	August 21, 2015	Haleakala	Pan-STARRS 1	·	940 m	MPC · JPL
881880	2015 QO_{43}	—	August 21, 2015	Haleakala	Pan-STARRS 1	JUN	600 m	MPC · JPL
881881	2015 RG_{3}	—	July 28, 2015	Haleakala	Pan-STARRS 2	·	530 m	MPC · JPL
881882	2015 RM_{3}	—	June 19, 2015	Haleakala	Pan-STARRS 1	·	1.9 km	MPC · JPL
881883	2015 RG_{4}	—	May 19, 2015	Haleakala	Pan-STARRS 1	·	1.4 km	MPC · JPL
881884	2015 RB_{7}	—	October 1, 2006	Kitt Peak	Spacewatch	·	1.3 km	MPC · JPL
881885	2015 RL_{17}	—	July 23, 2015	Haleakala	Pan-STARRS 1	·	960 m	MPC · JPL
881886	2015 RE_{23}	—	July 25, 2015	Haleakala	Pan-STARRS 1	·	810 m	MPC · JPL
881887	2015 RM_{23}	—	October 8, 2012	Mount Lemmon	Mount Lemmon Survey	·	450 m	MPC · JPL
881888	2015 RU_{24}	—	August 20, 2015	Kitt Peak	Spacewatch	DOR	1.2 km	MPC · JPL
881889	2015 RX_{25}	—	July 28, 2015	Haleakala	Pan-STARRS 1	·	1.1 km	MPC · JPL
881890	2015 RM_{27}	—	October 14, 2001	Socorro	LINEAR	·	2.1 km	MPC · JPL
881891	2015 RW_{34}	—	September 9, 2015	Haleakala	Pan-STARRS 1	(18466)	1.7 km	MPC · JPL
881892	2015 RM_{52}	—	September 20, 2001	Socorro	LINEAR	·	1.3 km	MPC · JPL
881893	2015 RE_{53}	—	October 2, 2006	Mount Lemmon	Mount Lemmon Survey	HOF	1.7 km	MPC · JPL
881894	2015 RG_{54}	—	September 15, 2010	Kitt Peak	Spacewatch	·	1.5 km	MPC · JPL
881895	2015 RE_{56}	—	September 10, 2015	Haleakala	Pan-STARRS 1	KOR	990 m	MPC · JPL
881896	2015 RX_{68}	—	September 26, 2006	Mount Lemmon	Mount Lemmon Survey	·	1.1 km	MPC · JPL
881897	2015 RJ_{72}	—	August 12, 2015	Haleakala	Pan-STARRS 1	·	850 m	MPC · JPL
881898	2015 RB_{82}	—	July 23, 2015	Haleakala	Pan-STARRS 1	AMO	330 m	MPC · JPL
881899	2015 RJ_{86}	—	July 28, 2015	Haleakala	Pan-STARRS 1	·	760 m	MPC · JPL
881900	2015 RK_{86}	—	September 16, 2006	Catalina	CSS	·	1.1 km	MPC · JPL

== 881901–882000 ==
back to top

Designation			Discovery			Properties		Ref
Permanent	Provisional	Named after	Date	Site	Discoverer(s)	Category	Diam.	Ref
881901	2015 RO_{96}	—	September 20, 2011	Catalina	CSS	·	770 m	MPC · JPL
881902	2015 RC_{97}	—	July 23, 2015	Haleakala	Pan-STARRS 1	·	1.0 km	MPC · JPL
881903	2015 RN_{98}	—	November 24, 2011	Mount Lemmon	Mount Lemmon Survey	·	740 m	MPC · JPL
881904	2015 RY_{104}	—	November 13, 2002	Kitt Peak	Spacewatch	·	920 m	MPC · JPL
881905	2015 RQ_{108}	—	October 1, 2011	Mount Lemmon	Mount Lemmon Survey	JUN	850 m	MPC · JPL
881906	2015 RN_{123}	—	August 19, 2006	Kitt Peak	Spacewatch	·	1.1 km	MPC · JPL
881907	2015 RP_{123}	—	July 23, 2015	Haleakala	Pan-STARRS 1	critical	2.0 km	MPC · JPL
881908	2015 RV_{125}	—	September 6, 2015	Kitt Peak	Spacewatch	·	1.3 km	MPC · JPL
881909	2015 RN_{131}	—	September 23, 2011	Haleakala	Pan-STARRS 1	MAR	690 m	MPC · JPL
881910	2015 RO_{131}	—	September 9, 2015	Haleakala	Pan-STARRS 1	critical	860 m	MPC · JPL
881911	2015 RJ_{140}	—	August 30, 2002	Palomar	NEAT	·	2.2 km	MPC · JPL
881912	2015 RN_{146}	—	October 2, 2006	Mount Lemmon	Mount Lemmon Survey	·	1.4 km	MPC · JPL
881913	2015 RR_{164}	—	September 9, 2015	Haleakala	Pan-STARRS 1	·	1.3 km	MPC · JPL
881914	2015 RK_{171}	—	September 9, 2015	Haleakala	Pan-STARRS 1	·	1.1 km	MPC · JPL
881915	2015 RH_{176}	—	March 14, 2007	Kitt Peak	Spacewatch	NYS	750 m	MPC · JPL
881916	2015 RC_{188}	—	September 10, 2015	Haleakala	Pan-STARRS 1	(194)	1.4 km	MPC · JPL
881917	2015 RO_{188}	—	June 29, 2015	Haleakala	Pan-STARRS 1	EUN	850 m	MPC · JPL
881918	2015 RV_{188}	—	July 12, 2015	Haleakala	Pan-STARRS 1	·	1.1 km	MPC · JPL
881919	2015 RS_{193}	—	September 2, 2010	Mount Lemmon	Mount Lemmon Survey	H	340 m	MPC · JPL
881920	2015 RB_{195}	—	October 16, 2006	Kitt Peak	Spacewatch	·	1.5 km	MPC · JPL
881921	2015 RY_{195}	—	September 11, 2015	Haleakala	Pan-STARRS 1	·	900 m	MPC · JPL
881922	2015 RO_{201}	—	September 11, 2015	Haleakala	Pan-STARRS 1	KOR	930 m	MPC · JPL
881923	2015 RO_{205}	—	September 11, 2015	Haleakala	Pan-STARRS 1	·	1.3 km	MPC · JPL
881924	2015 RS_{207}	—	September 11, 2015	Haleakala	Pan-STARRS 1	·	1.2 km	MPC · JPL
881925	2015 RQ_{215}	—	September 11, 2015	Haleakala	Pan-STARRS 1	AGN	800 m	MPC · JPL
881926	2015 RR_{215}	—	September 11, 2015	Haleakala	Pan-STARRS 1	·	1.2 km	MPC · JPL
881927	2015 RM_{216}	—	August 12, 2015	Haleakala	Pan-STARRS 1	·	1.4 km	MPC · JPL
881928	2015 RZ_{217}	—	September 13, 2005	Kitt Peak	Spacewatch	·	1.3 km	MPC · JPL
881929	2015 RU_{219}	—	October 9, 2010	Mount Lemmon	Mount Lemmon Survey	·	1.3 km	MPC · JPL
881930	2015 RN_{222}	—	August 12, 2015	Haleakala	Pan-STARRS 1	·	670 m	MPC · JPL
881931	2015 RP_{227}	—	September 11, 2015	Haleakala	Pan-STARRS 1	AGN	730 m	MPC · JPL
881932	2015 RW_{229}	—	October 26, 2006	Mauna Kea	P. A. Wiegert	·	1.4 km	MPC · JPL
881933	2015 RU_{233}	—	September 11, 2015	Haleakala	Pan-STARRS 1	·	560 m	MPC · JPL
881934	2015 RN_{235}	—	September 11, 2015	Haleakala	Pan-STARRS 1	·	1.3 km	MPC · JPL
881935	2015 RG_{237}	—	September 11, 2015	Haleakala	Pan-STARRS 1	·	1.3 km	MPC · JPL
881936	2015 RD_{240}	—	September 11, 2015	Haleakala	Pan-STARRS 1	BRA	1.0 km	MPC · JPL
881937	2015 RR_{248}	—	September 9, 2015	Haleakala	Pan-STARRS 1	·	1.1 km	MPC · JPL
881938	2015 RH_{249}	—	October 25, 2011	Haleakala	Pan-STARRS 1	(5)	830 m	MPC · JPL
881939	2015 RJ_{250}	—	September 11, 2015	Haleakala	Pan-STARRS 1	KOR	1.1 km	MPC · JPL
881940	2015 RV_{250}	—	September 11, 2015	Haleakala	Pan-STARRS 1	KOR	1.1 km	MPC · JPL
881941	2015 RG_{253}	—	September 9, 2015	Haleakala	Pan-STARRS 1	·	1.0 km	MPC · JPL
881942	2015 RQ_{259}	—	September 11, 2015	Haleakala	Pan-STARRS 1	·	1.2 km	MPC · JPL
881943	2015 RW_{264}	—	September 9, 2015	Haleakala	Pan-STARRS 1	AGN	770 m	MPC · JPL
881944	2015 RZ_{265}	—	September 9, 2015	Haleakala	Pan-STARRS 1	T_{j} (2.96)	3.2 km	MPC · JPL
881945	2015 RH_{268}	—	September 9, 2015	Haleakala	Pan-STARRS 1	·	1.4 km	MPC · JPL
881946	2015 RO_{271}	—	May 8, 2014	Haleakala	Pan-STARRS 1	·	1.1 km	MPC · JPL
881947	2015 RA_{273}	—	September 11, 2015	Haleakala	Pan-STARRS 1	·	1.5 km	MPC · JPL
881948	2015 RN_{284}	—	September 6, 2015	Haleakala	Pan-STARRS 1	·	1.2 km	MPC · JPL
881949	2015 RR_{286}	—	September 9, 2015	Haleakala	Pan-STARRS 1	·	1.0 km	MPC · JPL
881950	2015 RG_{288}	—	September 9, 2015	Haleakala	Pan-STARRS 1	·	1.3 km	MPC · JPL
881951	2015 RO_{292}	—	September 9, 2015	Haleakala	Pan-STARRS 1	·	1.2 km	MPC · JPL
881952	2015 RT_{294}	—	September 6, 2015	Haleakala	Pan-STARRS 1	·	1.8 km	MPC · JPL
881953	2015 RC_{296}	—	September 6, 2010	Piszkés-tető	K. Sárneczky, Z. Kuli	·	1.1 km	MPC · JPL
881954	2015 RL_{296}	—	September 10, 2015	Haleakala	Pan-STARRS 1	·	1.2 km	MPC · JPL
881955	2015 RJ_{304}	—	September 11, 2015	Haleakala	Pan-STARRS 1	·	1.5 km	MPC · JPL
881956	2015 RR_{313}	—	September 6, 2015	Kitt Peak	Spacewatch	·	1.2 km	MPC · JPL
881957	2015 RF_{316}	—	September 9, 2015	Haleakala	Pan-STARRS 1	H	300 m	MPC · JPL
881958	2015 RN_{317}	—	September 9, 2015	Haleakala	Pan-STARRS 1	·	1.1 km	MPC · JPL
881959	2015 RC_{319}	—	September 9, 2015	Haleakala	Pan-STARRS 1	·	1.5 km	MPC · JPL
881960	2015 RG_{319}	—	September 12, 2015	Haleakala	Pan-STARRS 1	·	1.3 km	MPC · JPL
881961	2015 RM_{319}	—	September 12, 2015	Haleakala	Pan-STARRS 1	KOR	1 km	MPC · JPL
881962	2015 RV_{319}	—	September 9, 2015	Haleakala	Pan-STARRS 1	·	1.2 km	MPC · JPL
881963	2015 RX_{321}	—	September 9, 2015	Haleakala	Pan-STARRS 1	critical	1.1 km	MPC · JPL
881964	2015 RG_{322}	—	September 6, 2015	Kitt Peak	Spacewatch	HOF	1.7 km	MPC · JPL
881965	2015 RZ_{324}	—	September 9, 2015	Haleakala	Pan-STARRS 1	·	1.1 km	MPC · JPL
881966	2015 RF_{326}	—	September 9, 2015	Haleakala	Pan-STARRS 1	·	1.2 km	MPC · JPL
881967	2015 RH_{326}	—	September 12, 2015	Haleakala	Pan-STARRS 1	·	1.1 km	MPC · JPL
881968	2015 RS_{338}	—	September 11, 2015	Haleakala	Pan-STARRS 1	AGN	840 m	MPC · JPL
881969	2015 RF_{339}	—	September 17, 2006	Kitt Peak	Spacewatch	·	1.3 km	MPC · JPL
881970	2015 RT_{339}	—	September 9, 2015	Haleakala	Pan-STARRS 1	·	1.2 km	MPC · JPL
881971	2015 RO_{341}	—	September 12, 2015	Haleakala	Pan-STARRS 1	·	1.2 km	MPC · JPL
881972	2015 RL_{352}	—	September 6, 2015	Kitt Peak	Spacewatch	·	2.3 km	MPC · JPL
881973	2015 RP_{355}	—	September 6, 2015	Haleakala	Pan-STARRS 1	GEF	690 m	MPC · JPL
881974	2015 RH_{361}	—	September 8, 2015	Haleakala	Pan-STARRS 1	·	1.1 km	MPC · JPL
881975	2015 RG_{376}	—	September 11, 2015	Haleakala	Pan-STARRS 1	·	1.6 km	MPC · JPL
881976	2015 SL_{3}	—	September 18, 2015	Catalina	CSS	·	1.4 km	MPC · JPL
881977	2015 SR_{13}	—	September 23, 2015	Mount Lemmon	Mount Lemmon Survey	·	1.3 km	MPC · JPL
881978	2015 SG_{19}	—	August 28, 2005	Siding Spring	SSS	·	2.3 km	MPC · JPL
881979	2015 SE_{25}	—	September 23, 2015	Haleakala	Pan-STARRS 1	·	1.4 km	MPC · JPL
881980	2015 SS_{25}	—	September 18, 2015	Kitt Peak	Spacewatch	NEM	1.4 km	MPC · JPL
881981	2015 SN_{28}	—	September 23, 2015	Haleakala	Pan-STARRS 1	WIT	840 m	MPC · JPL
881982	2015 SS_{31}	—	September 23, 2015	Haleakala	Pan-STARRS 1	·	540 m	MPC · JPL
881983	2015 SJ_{33}	—	September 23, 2015	Haleakala	Pan-STARRS 1	EOS	1.3 km	MPC · JPL
881984	2015 SV_{33}	—	September 24, 2015	Mount Lemmon	Mount Lemmon Survey	·	690 m	MPC · JPL
881985	2015 SC_{35}	—	September 25, 2015	Mount Lemmon	Mount Lemmon Survey	·	530 m	MPC · JPL
881986	2015 SO_{35}	—	September 23, 2015	Haleakala	Pan-STARRS 1	·	870 m	MPC · JPL
881987	2015 SD_{36}	—	September 24, 2015	Mount Lemmon	Mount Lemmon Survey	·	1.6 km	MPC · JPL
881988	2015 SA_{37}	—	September 24, 2015	Mount Lemmon	Mount Lemmon Survey	·	1.7 km	MPC · JPL
881989	2015 SG_{42}	—	September 23, 2015	Haleakala	Pan-STARRS 1	·	1.5 km	MPC · JPL
881990	2015 SE_{44}	—	September 19, 2015	Haleakala	Pan-STARRS 1	·	770 m	MPC · JPL
881991	2015 SG_{44}	—	September 23, 2015	Haleakala	Pan-STARRS 1	·	1.6 km	MPC · JPL
881992	2015 ST_{44}	—	September 23, 2015	Mount Lemmon	Mount Lemmon Survey	·	1.4 km	MPC · JPL
881993	2015 SW_{44}	—	September 23, 2015	Haleakala	Pan-STARRS 1	·	1.4 km	MPC · JPL
881994	2015 SE_{45}	—	September 23, 2015	Haleakala	Pan-STARRS 1	NAE	1.8 km	MPC · JPL
881995	2015 SH_{45}	—	September 23, 2015	Mount Lemmon	Mount Lemmon Survey	WIT	670 m	MPC · JPL
881996	2015 SN_{56}	—	September 23, 2015	Haleakala	Pan-STARRS 1	·	1.3 km	MPC · JPL
881997	2015 SX_{56}	—	September 25, 2015	Mount Lemmon	Mount Lemmon Survey	·	1.2 km	MPC · JPL
881998	2015 SJ_{57}	—	September 23, 2015	Haleakala	Pan-STARRS 1	·	1.2 km	MPC · JPL
881999	2015 TY_{3}	—	February 16, 2013	Mount Lemmon	Mount Lemmon Survey	·	1.2 km	MPC · JPL
882000	2015 TV_{14}	—	July 25, 2015	Haleakala	Pan-STARRS 1	·	920 m	MPC · JPL

back to top
