= List of minor planets: 854001–855000 =

The following is a partial list of minor planets, running from minor-planet number 854001 through 855000, inclusive. The primary data for this and other partial lists is based on JPL's "Small-Body Orbital Elements" and data available from the Minor Planet Center. Critical list information is also provided by the MPC, unless otherwise specified from Lowell Observatory. A detailed description of the table's columns and additional sources are given on the main page including a complete list of every page in this series, and a statistical break-up on the dynamical classification of minor planets.

Also see the summary list of all named bodies in numerical and alphabetical order, and the corresponding naming citations for the number range of this particular list. New namings may only be added to this list after official publication, as the preannouncement of names is condemned by the Working Group for Small Bodies Nomenclature of the International Astronomical Union.

Near-Earth obj.	MBA (inner)	MBA (outer)	Centaur
Mars-crosser	MBA (middle)	Jupiter trojan	Trans-Neptunian obj.
Unclassified

== 854001–854100 ==
Designation			Discovery			Properties		Ref
Permanent	Provisional	Named after	Date	Site	Discoverer(s)	Category	Diam.	Ref
854001	2009 VE_{1}	—	November 8, 2009	Kitt Peak	Spacewatch	H	440 m	MPC · JPL
854002	2009 VW_{3}	—	October 24, 2009	Kitt Peak	Spacewatch	·	690 m	MPC · JPL
854003	2009 VV_{8}	—	November 8, 2009	Mount Lemmon	Mount Lemmon Survey	·	2.3 km	MPC · JPL
854004	2009 VB_{9}	—	September 16, 2009	Mount Lemmon	Mount Lemmon Survey	·	1.9 km	MPC · JPL
854005	2009 VZ_{13}	—	November 8, 2009	Mount Lemmon	Mount Lemmon Survey	·	1.4 km	MPC · JPL
854006	2009 VB_{15}	—	November 8, 2009	Mount Lemmon	Mount Lemmon Survey	·	1.4 km	MPC · JPL
854007	2009 VA_{20}	—	November 9, 2009	Mount Lemmon	Mount Lemmon Survey	·	1.8 km	MPC · JPL
854008	2009 VD_{27}	—	October 24, 2009	Catalina	CSS	·	930 m	MPC · JPL
854009	2009 VY_{41}	—	November 10, 2009	Mount Lemmon	Mount Lemmon Survey	·	540 m	MPC · JPL
854010	2009 VW_{45}	—	October 27, 2009	Kitt Peak	Spacewatch	·	1.9 km	MPC · JPL
854011	2009 VJ_{48}	—	November 9, 2009	Mount Lemmon	Mount Lemmon Survey	·	520 m	MPC · JPL
854012	2009 VO_{53}	—	October 22, 1998	Kitt Peak	Spacewatch	·	1.9 km	MPC · JPL
854013	2009 VR_{55}	—	September 28, 2009	Kitt Peak	Spacewatch	·	2.0 km	MPC · JPL
854014	2009 VH_{56}	—	November 11, 2009	Mount Lemmon	Mount Lemmon Survey	·	1.6 km	MPC · JPL
854015	2009 VE_{67}	—	November 9, 2009	Mount Lemmon	Mount Lemmon Survey	·	2.5 km	MPC · JPL
854016	2009 VZ_{68}	—	November 9, 2009	Mount Lemmon	Mount Lemmon Survey	NYS	690 m	MPC · JPL
854017	2009 VB_{69}	—	November 9, 2009	Mount Lemmon	Mount Lemmon Survey	NYS	660 m	MPC · JPL
854018	2009 VL_{70}	—	November 9, 2009	Mount Lemmon	Mount Lemmon Survey	LIX	2.3 km	MPC · JPL
854019	2009 VH_{78}	—	November 9, 2009	Catalina	CSS	PHO	710 m	MPC · JPL
854020	2009 VO_{82}	—	November 8, 2009	Kitt Peak	Spacewatch	·	1.8 km	MPC · JPL
854021	2009 VS_{85}	—	November 10, 2009	Kitt Peak	Spacewatch	·	1.4 km	MPC · JPL
854022	2009 VU_{86}	—	November 10, 2009	Kitt Peak	Spacewatch	·	540 m	MPC · JPL
854023	2009 VU_{89}	—	November 11, 2009	Kitt Peak	Spacewatch	·	1.9 km	MPC · JPL
854024	2009 VV_{89}	—	November 11, 2009	Kitt Peak	Spacewatch	·	720 m	MPC · JPL
854025	2009 VH_{90}	—	November 11, 2009	Kitt Peak	Spacewatch	·	2.2 km	MPC · JPL
854026	2009 VS_{90}	—	November 11, 2009	Kitt Peak	Spacewatch	·	1.5 km	MPC · JPL
854027	2009 VE_{91}	—	November 11, 2009	Kitt Peak	Spacewatch	·	2.0 km	MPC · JPL
854028	2009 VN_{102}	—	November 11, 2009	Kitt Peak	Spacewatch	·	440 m	MPC · JPL
854029	2009 VG_{104}	—	September 28, 2009	Catalina	CSS	·	2.4 km	MPC · JPL
854030	2009 VO_{112}	—	October 27, 2009	Mount Lemmon	Mount Lemmon Survey	JUN	840 m	MPC · JPL
854031	2009 VB_{116}	—	November 10, 2009	Mount Lemmon	Mount Lemmon Survey	·	800 m	MPC · JPL
854032	2009 VQ_{120}	—	November 8, 2009	Mount Lemmon	Mount Lemmon Survey	H	300 m	MPC · JPL
854033	2009 VX_{120}	—	November 9, 2009	Kitt Peak	Spacewatch	·	940 m	MPC · JPL
854034	2009 VZ_{120}	—	June 18, 2015	Haleakala	Pan-STARRS 1	·	780 m	MPC · JPL
854035	2009 VH_{121}	—	November 9, 2009	Kitt Peak	Spacewatch	·	2.4 km	MPC · JPL
854036	2009 VY_{121}	—	February 26, 2011	Mount Lemmon	Mount Lemmon Survey	·	1.1 km	MPC · JPL
854037	2009 VK_{123}	—	November 9, 2009	Mount Lemmon	Mount Lemmon Survey	·	1.5 km	MPC · JPL
854038	2009 VP_{123}	—	January 18, 2016	Haleakala	Pan-STARRS 1	·	2.1 km	MPC · JPL
854039	2009 VG_{124}	—	November 11, 2009	Kitt Peak	Spacewatch	VER	1.9 km	MPC · JPL
854040	2009 VN_{124}	—	October 3, 2014	Mount Lemmon	Mount Lemmon Survey	·	1.8 km	MPC · JPL
854041	2009 VT_{124}	—	March 4, 2017	Haleakala	Pan-STARRS 1	·	1.4 km	MPC · JPL
854042	2009 VB_{125}	—	November 11, 2009	Kitt Peak	Spacewatch	·	530 m	MPC · JPL
854043	2009 VH_{125}	—	November 9, 2009	Mount Lemmon	Mount Lemmon Survey	·	480 m	MPC · JPL
854044	2009 VT_{125}	—	November 8, 2009	Kitt Peak	Spacewatch	AGN	860 m	MPC · JPL
854045	2009 VM_{126}	—	November 9, 2009	Kitt Peak	Spacewatch	·	1.1 km	MPC · JPL
854046	2009 VU_{126}	—	November 11, 2009	Kitt Peak	Spacewatch	·	590 m	MPC · JPL
854047	2009 VB_{128}	—	November 9, 2009	Mount Lemmon	Mount Lemmon Survey	·	1.1 km	MPC · JPL
854048	2009 VH_{128}	—	November 9, 2009	Kitt Peak	Spacewatch	·	2.5 km	MPC · JPL
854049	2009 VT_{128}	—	November 9, 2009	Mount Lemmon	Mount Lemmon Survey	EOS	1.5 km	MPC · JPL
854050	2009 VR_{129}	—	November 11, 2009	Kitt Peak	Spacewatch	·	2.4 km	MPC · JPL
854051	2009 VT_{129}	—	November 9, 2009	Kitt Peak	Spacewatch	LIX	2.3 km	MPC · JPL
854052	2009 VM_{130}	—	November 8, 2009	Mount Lemmon	Mount Lemmon Survey	AGN	750 m	MPC · JPL
854053	2009 VR_{130}	—	November 8, 2009	Mount Lemmon	Mount Lemmon Survey	·	1.7 km	MPC · JPL
854054	2009 VV_{130}	—	November 10, 2009	Kitt Peak	Spacewatch	NYS	730 m	MPC · JPL
854055	2009 VC_{132}	—	November 10, 2009	Mount Lemmon	Mount Lemmon Survey	·	1.1 km	MPC · JPL
854056	2009 VL_{132}	—	November 11, 2009	Mount Lemmon	Mount Lemmon Survey	·	1.5 km	MPC · JPL
854057	2009 VD_{135}	—	November 8, 2009	Kitt Peak	Spacewatch	·	1.4 km	MPC · JPL
854058	2009 WE_{3}	—	October 16, 2009	Mount Lemmon	Mount Lemmon Survey	·	820 m	MPC · JPL
854059	2009 WF_{4}	—	November 16, 2009	Kitt Peak	Spacewatch	H	410 m	MPC · JPL
854060	2009 WS_{10}	—	November 20, 2009	Mount Lemmon	Mount Lemmon Survey	·	290 m	MPC · JPL
854061	2009 WD_{13}	—	October 14, 2009	Mount Lemmon	Mount Lemmon Survey	·	1.3 km	MPC · JPL
854062	2009 WT_{13}	—	October 14, 2009	Mount Lemmon	Mount Lemmon Survey	·	2.2 km	MPC · JPL
854063	2009 WQ_{15}	—	November 16, 2009	Mount Lemmon	Mount Lemmon Survey	MIS	1.7 km	MPC · JPL
854064	2009 WO_{16}	—	October 16, 2009	Mount Lemmon	Mount Lemmon Survey	·	490 m	MPC · JPL
854065	2009 WX_{16}	—	October 22, 2009	Mount Lemmon	Mount Lemmon Survey	EOS	1.2 km	MPC · JPL
854066	2009 WM_{17}	—	November 17, 2009	Kitt Peak	Spacewatch	·	2.5 km	MPC · JPL
854067	2009 WH_{21}	—	November 18, 2009	Kitt Peak	Spacewatch	·	1.8 km	MPC · JPL
854068	2009 WT_{22}	—	October 25, 2009	Kitt Peak	Spacewatch	·	1.5 km	MPC · JPL
854069	2009 WQ_{23}	—	November 10, 2009	Kitt Peak	Spacewatch	·	890 m	MPC · JPL
854070	2009 WP_{31}	—	November 16, 2009	Kitt Peak	Spacewatch	PHO	950 m	MPC · JPL
854071	2009 WG_{40}	—	November 17, 2009	Kitt Peak	Spacewatch	GAL	1.2 km	MPC · JPL
854072	2009 WX_{54}	—	November 16, 2009	Mount Lemmon	Mount Lemmon Survey	·	1.4 km	MPC · JPL
854073	2009 WM_{57}	—	November 16, 2009	Mount Lemmon	Mount Lemmon Survey	·	2.0 km	MPC · JPL
854074	2009 WT_{59}	—	October 23, 2009	Kitt Peak	Spacewatch	THM	1.6 km	MPC · JPL
854075	2009 WU_{63}	—	November 16, 2009	Mount Lemmon	Mount Lemmon Survey	·	1.1 km	MPC · JPL
854076	2009 WG_{71}	—	November 18, 2009	Kitt Peak	Spacewatch	·	2.4 km	MPC · JPL
854077	2009 WB_{77}	—	November 18, 2009	Kitt Peak	Spacewatch	·	3.4 km	MPC · JPL
854078	2009 WJ_{78}	—	November 18, 2009	Kitt Peak	Spacewatch	·	780 m	MPC · JPL
854079	2009 WF_{79}	—	November 18, 2009	Mount Lemmon	Mount Lemmon Survey	H	380 m	MPC · JPL
854080	2009 WA_{82}	—	September 22, 2009	Kitt Peak	Spacewatch	·	1.3 km	MPC · JPL
854081	2009 WE_{83}	—	November 19, 2009	Kitt Peak	Spacewatch	·	640 m	MPC · JPL
854082	2009 WO_{83}	—	November 11, 2009	Kitt Peak	Spacewatch	·	2.0 km	MPC · JPL
854083	2009 WB_{85}	—	November 11, 2009	Kitt Peak	Spacewatch	V	480 m	MPC · JPL
854084	2009 WC_{88}	—	November 19, 2009	Kitt Peak	Spacewatch	·	650 m	MPC · JPL
854085	2009 WT_{88}	—	November 19, 2009	Kitt Peak	Spacewatch	·	430 m	MPC · JPL
854086	2009 WO_{91}	—	November 19, 2009	Mount Lemmon	Mount Lemmon Survey	·	880 m	MPC · JPL
854087	2009 WR_{93}	—	September 28, 2009	Mount Lemmon	Mount Lemmon Survey	·	730 m	MPC · JPL
854088	2009 WX_{94}	—	November 20, 2009	Mount Lemmon	Mount Lemmon Survey	·	1.2 km	MPC · JPL
854089	2009 WL_{97}	—	September 21, 2009	Mount Lemmon	Mount Lemmon Survey	·	2.0 km	MPC · JPL
854090	2009 WS_{97}	—	November 20, 2009	Mount Lemmon	Mount Lemmon Survey	·	510 m	MPC · JPL
854091	2009 WY_{99}	—	November 21, 2009	Mount Lemmon	Mount Lemmon Survey	·	400 m	MPC · JPL
854092	2009 WC_{103}	—	November 22, 2009	Mount Lemmon	Mount Lemmon Survey	·	1.1 km	MPC · JPL
854093	2009 WR_{105}	—	September 20, 2009	Mount Lemmon	Mount Lemmon Survey	·	850 m	MPC · JPL
854094	2009 WL_{108}	—	October 23, 2009	Mount Lemmon	Mount Lemmon Survey	·	970 m	MPC · JPL
854095	2009 WW_{109}	—	September 28, 2009	Mount Lemmon	Mount Lemmon Survey	·	460 m	MPC · JPL
854096	2009 WX_{110}	—	November 17, 2009	Mount Lemmon	Mount Lemmon Survey	·	470 m	MPC · JPL
854097	2009 WT_{116}	—	November 20, 2009	Kitt Peak	Spacewatch	·	1.7 km	MPC · JPL
854098	2009 WD_{117}	—	November 20, 2009	Kitt Peak	Spacewatch	·	1.2 km	MPC · JPL
854099	2009 WM_{117}	—	October 27, 2009	Kitt Peak	Spacewatch	·	2.0 km	MPC · JPL
854100	2009 WV_{117}	—	September 21, 2009	Mount Lemmon	Mount Lemmon Survey	·	1.4 km	MPC · JPL

== 854101–854200 ==
back to top

Designation			Discovery			Properties		Ref
Permanent	Provisional	Named after	Date	Site	Discoverer(s)	Category	Diam.	Ref
854101	2009 WA_{118}	—	November 20, 2009	Kitt Peak	Spacewatch	THM	1.7 km	MPC · JPL
854102	2009 WM_{120}	—	November 20, 2009	Kitt Peak	Spacewatch	·	2.5 km	MPC · JPL
854103	2009 WQ_{120}	—	November 20, 2009	Kitt Peak	Spacewatch	·	1.1 km	MPC · JPL
854104	2009 WE_{125}	—	November 20, 2009	Kitt Peak	Spacewatch	·	730 m	MPC · JPL
854105	2009 WS_{126}	—	November 20, 2009	Kitt Peak	Spacewatch	·	1.7 km	MPC · JPL
854106	2009 WF_{130}	—	November 20, 2009	Mount Lemmon	Mount Lemmon Survey	·	1.3 km	MPC · JPL
854107	2009 WX_{130}	—	November 20, 2009	Kitt Peak	Spacewatch	EOS	1.4 km	MPC · JPL
854108	2009 WQ_{133}	—	November 22, 2009	Kitt Peak	Spacewatch	·	530 m	MPC · JPL
854109	2009 WN_{134}	—	September 19, 2009	Mount Lemmon	Mount Lemmon Survey	TIR	2.0 km	MPC · JPL
854110	2009 WJ_{137}	—	October 27, 2009	Kitt Peak	Spacewatch	·	1.9 km	MPC · JPL
854111	2009 WC_{139}	—	December 3, 1996	Kitt Peak	Spacewatch	·	1.2 km	MPC · JPL
854112	2009 WW_{140}	—	November 18, 2009	Mount Lemmon	Mount Lemmon Survey	·	580 m	MPC · JPL
854113	2009 WV_{141}	—	November 18, 2009	Mount Lemmon	Mount Lemmon Survey	HOF	1.7 km	MPC · JPL
854114	2009 WY_{141}	—	November 18, 2009	Mount Lemmon	Mount Lemmon Survey	·	950 m	MPC · JPL
854115	2009 WA_{143}	—	October 14, 2009	La Sagra	OAM	NYS	920 m	MPC · JPL
854116	2009 WH_{143}	—	November 19, 2009	Mount Lemmon	Mount Lemmon Survey	·	1.1 km	MPC · JPL
854117	2009 WX_{148}	—	October 25, 2003	Kitt Peak	Spacewatch	URS	2.1 km	MPC · JPL
854118	2009 WD_{150}	—	September 28, 2009	Mount Lemmon	Mount Lemmon Survey	·	1.2 km	MPC · JPL
854119	2009 WZ_{153}	—	November 19, 2009	Mount Lemmon	Mount Lemmon Survey	·	590 m	MPC · JPL
854120	2009 WG_{154}	—	November 19, 2009	Mount Lemmon	Mount Lemmon Survey	·	930 m	MPC · JPL
854121	2009 WJ_{157}	—	November 20, 2009	Mount Lemmon	Mount Lemmon Survey	·	510 m	MPC · JPL
854122	2009 WC_{158}	—	November 20, 2009	Mount Lemmon	Mount Lemmon Survey	·	1.8 km	MPC · JPL
854123	2009 WX_{158}	—	November 20, 2009	Mount Lemmon	Mount Lemmon Survey	·	610 m	MPC · JPL
854124	2009 WQ_{159}	—	November 21, 2009	Kitt Peak	Spacewatch	·	1.8 km	MPC · JPL
854125	2009 WN_{161}	—	November 21, 2009	Kitt Peak	Spacewatch	·	960 m	MPC · JPL
854126	2009 WS_{161}	—	September 20, 2009	Mount Lemmon	Mount Lemmon Survey	·	690 m	MPC · JPL
854127	2009 WZ_{162}	—	November 21, 2009	Kitt Peak	Spacewatch	·	450 m	MPC · JPL
854128	2009 WL_{164}	—	November 21, 2009	Kitt Peak	Spacewatch	EOS	1.4 km	MPC · JPL
854129	2009 WT_{164}	—	November 21, 2009	Kitt Peak	Spacewatch	·	1.8 km	MPC · JPL
854130	2009 WA_{166}	—	November 21, 2009	Kitt Peak	Spacewatch	·	1.4 km	MPC · JPL
854131	2009 WT_{172}	—	October 25, 2009	Mount Lemmon	Mount Lemmon Survey	·	1.3 km	MPC · JPL
854132	2009 WX_{173}	—	November 11, 2009	Kitt Peak	Spacewatch	·	2.5 km	MPC · JPL
854133	2009 WG_{176}	—	October 24, 2009	Kitt Peak	Spacewatch	·	2.1 km	MPC · JPL
854134	2009 WZ_{178}	—	November 23, 2009	Kitt Peak	Spacewatch	·	2.0 km	MPC · JPL
854135	2009 WE_{181}	—	November 23, 2009	Kitt Peak	Spacewatch	·	1.5 km	MPC · JPL
854136	2009 WU_{183}	—	July 11, 2005	Kitt Peak	Spacewatch	·	620 m	MPC · JPL
854137	2009 WS_{185}	—	November 11, 2009	Mount Lemmon	Mount Lemmon Survey	·	830 m	MPC · JPL
854138	2009 WV_{192}	—	November 9, 2009	Kitt Peak	Spacewatch	·	2.0 km	MPC · JPL
854139	2009 WA_{193}	—	December 27, 2005	Kitt Peak	Spacewatch	·	1.2 km	MPC · JPL
854140	2009 WK_{196}	—	October 22, 2009	Mount Lemmon	Mount Lemmon Survey	·	2.1 km	MPC · JPL
854141	2009 WK_{201}	—	November 26, 2009	Mount Lemmon	Mount Lemmon Survey	·	1.2 km	MPC · JPL
854142	2009 WC_{204}	—	November 16, 2009	Kitt Peak	Spacewatch	·	490 m	MPC · JPL
854143	2009 WT_{204}	—	November 17, 2009	Kitt Peak	Spacewatch	·	780 m	MPC · JPL
854144	2009 WD_{205}	—	November 17, 2009	Kitt Peak	Spacewatch	·	580 m	MPC · JPL
854145	2009 WU_{205}	—	November 17, 2009	Kitt Peak	Spacewatch	·	840 m	MPC · JPL
854146	2009 WM_{210}	—	November 10, 2009	Kitt Peak	Spacewatch	·	1.8 km	MPC · JPL
854147	2009 WO_{210}	—	September 12, 2005	Kitt Peak	Spacewatch	MAS	490 m	MPC · JPL
854148	2009 WS_{211}	—	August 28, 2005	Kitt Peak	Spacewatch	·	770 m	MPC · JPL
854149	2009 WS_{218}	—	November 16, 2009	Kitt Peak	Spacewatch	THM	1.7 km	MPC · JPL
854150	2009 WB_{219}	—	November 16, 2009	Mount Lemmon	Mount Lemmon Survey	·	2.0 km	MPC · JPL
854151	2009 WM_{220}	—	October 27, 2009	Kitt Peak	Spacewatch	THM	1.4 km	MPC · JPL
854152	2009 WX_{221}	—	October 22, 2009	Mount Lemmon	Mount Lemmon Survey	·	720 m	MPC · JPL
854153	2009 WT_{222}	—	October 23, 2009	Mount Lemmon	Mount Lemmon Survey	·	1.7 km	MPC · JPL
854154	2009 WC_{223}	—	November 16, 2009	Mount Lemmon	Mount Lemmon Survey	THM	1.3 km	MPC · JPL
854155	2009 WN_{227}	—	November 17, 2009	Mount Lemmon	Mount Lemmon Survey	EOS	1.2 km	MPC · JPL
854156	2009 WT_{228}	—	November 17, 2009	Mount Lemmon	Mount Lemmon Survey	·	1.2 km	MPC · JPL
854157	2009 WE_{230}	—	November 17, 2009	Mount Lemmon	Mount Lemmon Survey	·	1.6 km	MPC · JPL
854158	2009 WP_{233}	—	September 28, 2009	Mount Lemmon	Mount Lemmon Survey	·	1.2 km	MPC · JPL
854159	2009 WC_{235}	—	November 20, 2009	Kitt Peak	Spacewatch	·	620 m	MPC · JPL
854160	2009 WF_{241}	—	August 29, 2005	Palomar	NEAT	·	940 m	MPC · JPL
854161	2009 WQ_{244}	—	November 19, 2009	Kitt Peak	Spacewatch	·	510 m	MPC · JPL
854162	2009 WW_{246}	—	November 9, 2009	Kitt Peak	Spacewatch	·	1.8 km	MPC · JPL
854163	2009 WB_{253}	—	November 27, 2009	Mount Lemmon	Mount Lemmon Survey	·	2.3 km	MPC · JPL
854164	2009 WH_{256}	—	November 24, 2009	Kitt Peak	Spacewatch	·	1.5 km	MPC · JPL
854165	2009 WQ_{258}	—	November 27, 2009	Mount Lemmon	Mount Lemmon Survey	·	2.4 km	MPC · JPL
854166	2009 WH_{265}	—	August 27, 2014	Haleakala	Pan-STARRS 1	·	1.7 km	MPC · JPL
854167	2009 WR_{275}	—	January 28, 2015	Haleakala	Pan-STARRS 1	·	1.1 km	MPC · JPL
854168	2009 WD_{276}	—	October 2, 2014	Haleakala	Pan-STARRS 1	·	2.7 km	MPC · JPL
854169	2009 WE_{276}	—	November 20, 2009	Mount Lemmon	Mount Lemmon Survey	MAS	540 m	MPC · JPL
854170	2009 WM_{276}	—	September 16, 2014	Haleakala	Pan-STARRS 1	TIR	2.7 km	MPC · JPL
854171	2009 WW_{276}	—	November 23, 2009	Mount Lemmon	Mount Lemmon Survey	·	810 m	MPC · JPL
854172	2009 WX_{276}	—	November 27, 2009	Mount Lemmon	Mount Lemmon Survey	·	2.4 km	MPC · JPL
854173	2009 WQ_{277}	—	November 21, 2009	Mount Lemmon	Mount Lemmon Survey	H	400 m	MPC · JPL
854174	2009 WR_{277}	—	November 26, 2009	Mount Lemmon	Mount Lemmon Survey	·	1.1 km	MPC · JPL
854175	2009 WW_{278}	—	August 25, 2014	Haleakala	Pan-STARRS 1	·	2.1 km	MPC · JPL
854176	2009 WP_{280}	—	October 29, 2014	Kitt Peak	Spacewatch	·	1.3 km	MPC · JPL
854177	2009 WC_{281}	—	November 25, 2009	Kitt Peak	Spacewatch	·	490 m	MPC · JPL
854178	2009 WH_{281}	—	April 11, 2015	Mount Lemmon	Mount Lemmon Survey	·	980 m	MPC · JPL
854179	2009 WA_{282}	—	October 28, 2016	Haleakala	Pan-STARRS 1	V	410 m	MPC · JPL
854180	2009 WC_{282}	—	October 3, 2014	Mount Lemmon	Mount Lemmon Survey	EOS	1.3 km	MPC · JPL
854181	2009 WF_{283}	—	February 20, 2015	Haleakala	Pan-STARRS 1	·	1.1 km	MPC · JPL
854182	2009 WH_{283}	—	April 5, 2017	Haleakala	Pan-STARRS 1	·	3.1 km	MPC · JPL
854183	2009 WU_{283}	—	November 16, 2009	Kitt Peak	Spacewatch	·	520 m	MPC · JPL
854184	2009 WU_{285}	—	January 3, 2016	Haleakala	Pan-STARRS 1	·	1.6 km	MPC · JPL
854185	2009 WJ_{288}	—	November 19, 2009	Kitt Peak	Spacewatch	·	460 m	MPC · JPL
854186	2009 WT_{288}	—	November 21, 2009	Kitt Peak	Spacewatch	·	1.9 km	MPC · JPL
854187	2009 WG_{289}	—	November 25, 2009	Kitt Peak	Spacewatch	·	590 m	MPC · JPL
854188	2009 WL_{289}	—	November 25, 2009	Kitt Peak	Spacewatch	V	450 m	MPC · JPL
854189	2009 WU_{289}	—	November 21, 2009	Mount Lemmon	Mount Lemmon Survey	·	870 m	MPC · JPL
854190	2009 WE_{290}	—	November 26, 2009	Mount Lemmon	Mount Lemmon Survey	·	2.3 km	MPC · JPL
854191	2009 WC_{291}	—	November 26, 2009	Mount Lemmon	Mount Lemmon Survey	·	1.9 km	MPC · JPL
854192	2009 WT_{291}	—	November 21, 2009	Kitt Peak	Spacewatch	·	2.2 km	MPC · JPL
854193	2009 WW_{292}	—	November 16, 2009	Kitt Peak	Spacewatch	·	2.0 km	MPC · JPL
854194	2009 WC_{293}	—	November 21, 2009	Kitt Peak	Spacewatch	HYG	1.8 km	MPC · JPL
854195	2009 WM_{293}	—	November 20, 2009	Mount Lemmon	Mount Lemmon Survey	·	2.3 km	MPC · JPL
854196	2009 WR_{293}	—	November 23, 2009	Mount Lemmon	Mount Lemmon Survey	EOS	1.4 km	MPC · JPL
854197	2009 WV_{293}	—	November 21, 2009	Mount Lemmon	Mount Lemmon Survey	·	890 m	MPC · JPL
854198	2009 WH_{294}	—	November 26, 2009	Kitt Peak	Spacewatch	(2076)	520 m	MPC · JPL
854199	2009 WX_{295}	—	November 25, 2009	Kitt Peak	Spacewatch	·	2.2 km	MPC · JPL
854200	2009 WO_{298}	—	November 27, 2009	Mount Lemmon	Mount Lemmon Survey	(5)	820 m	MPC · JPL

== 854201–854300 ==
back to top

Designation			Discovery			Properties		Ref
Permanent	Provisional	Named after	Date	Site	Discoverer(s)	Category	Diam.	Ref
854201	2009 WL_{299}	—	November 19, 2009	Mount Lemmon	Mount Lemmon Survey	·	2.1 km	MPC · JPL
854202	2009 WF_{301}	—	November 23, 2009	Mount Lemmon	Mount Lemmon Survey	·	380 m	MPC · JPL
854203	2009 WW_{301}	—	November 17, 2009	Mount Lemmon	Mount Lemmon Survey	·	1.1 km	MPC · JPL
854204	2009 WJ_{302}	—	November 24, 2009	Mount Lemmon	Mount Lemmon Survey	·	2.3 km	MPC · JPL
854205	2009 XD_{4}	—	December 10, 2009	Mount Lemmon	Mount Lemmon Survey	·	550 m	MPC · JPL
854206	2009 XT_{12}	—	November 9, 2009	Mount Lemmon	Mount Lemmon Survey	·	1.9 km	MPC · JPL
854207	2009 XP_{20}	—	December 10, 2009	Mount Lemmon	Mount Lemmon Survey	·	1.1 km	MPC · JPL
854208	2009 XR_{27}	—	October 24, 2009	Kitt Peak	Spacewatch	V	440 m	MPC · JPL
854209	2009 XU_{27}	—	June 30, 2017	Mount Lemmon	Mount Lemmon Survey	EUN	1 km	MPC · JPL
854210	2009 YU_{3}	—	December 17, 2009	Kitt Peak	Spacewatch	·	2.5 km	MPC · JPL
854211	2009 YZ_{12}	—	October 27, 2009	Mount Lemmon	Mount Lemmon Survey	PHO	700 m	MPC · JPL
854212	2009 YT_{15}	—	December 19, 2009	Mount Lemmon	Mount Lemmon Survey	·	1.4 km	MPC · JPL
854213	2009 YL_{18}	—	December 15, 2009	Mount Lemmon	Mount Lemmon Survey	·	720 m	MPC · JPL
854214	2009 YJ_{23}	—	December 20, 2009	Kitt Peak	Spacewatch	H	500 m	MPC · JPL
854215	2009 YX_{28}	—	September 21, 2012	Mount Lemmon	Mount Lemmon Survey	·	640 m	MPC · JPL
854216	2009 YT_{29}	—	September 30, 2017	Haleakala	Pan-STARRS 1	·	930 m	MPC · JPL
854217	2009 YC_{30}	—	November 26, 2014	Mount Lemmon	Mount Lemmon Survey	·	1.2 km	MPC · JPL
854218	2009 YF_{30}	—	April 8, 2014	Kitt Peak	Spacewatch	·	610 m	MPC · JPL
854219	2009 YK_{30}	—	January 21, 2014	Mount Lemmon	Mount Lemmon Survey	·	760 m	MPC · JPL
854220	2009 YY_{30}	—	February 4, 2017	Haleakala	Pan-STARRS 1	·	510 m	MPC · JPL
854221	2009 YK_{31}	—	December 19, 2009	Mount Lemmon	Mount Lemmon Survey	URS	2.4 km	MPC · JPL
854222	2009 YP_{31}	—	December 18, 2009	Kitt Peak	Spacewatch	·	1.0 km	MPC · JPL
854223	2009 YJ_{32}	—	December 19, 2009	Kitt Peak	Spacewatch	·	1.3 km	MPC · JPL
854224	2009 YL_{32}	—	December 20, 2009	Mount Lemmon	Mount Lemmon Survey	·	2.4 km	MPC · JPL
854225	2009 YK_{33}	—	December 18, 2009	Mount Lemmon	Mount Lemmon Survey	·	720 m	MPC · JPL
854226	2009 YU_{33}	—	December 19, 2009	Mount Lemmon	Mount Lemmon Survey	·	1.2 km	MPC · JPL
854227	2009 YZ_{33}	—	December 20, 2009	Kitt Peak	Spacewatch	H	400 m	MPC · JPL
854228	2009 YN_{34}	—	December 18, 2009	Mount Lemmon	Mount Lemmon Survey	H	420 m	MPC · JPL
854229	2009 YU_{34}	—	December 17, 2009	Mount Lemmon	Mount Lemmon Survey	·	870 m	MPC · JPL
854230	2009 YH_{35}	—	November 16, 2009	Mount Lemmon	Mount Lemmon Survey	H	360 m	MPC · JPL
854231	2010 AB_{7}	—	January 6, 2010	Kitt Peak	Spacewatch	·	2.1 km	MPC · JPL
854232	2010 AN_{7}	—	January 6, 2010	Kitt Peak	Spacewatch	·	580 m	MPC · JPL
854233	2010 AZ_{7}	—	November 20, 2009	Mount Lemmon	Mount Lemmon Survey	·	730 m	MPC · JPL
854234	2010 AR_{9}	—	January 6, 2010	Kitt Peak	Spacewatch	·	2.3 km	MPC · JPL
854235	2010 AU_{10}	—	January 6, 2010	Mount Lemmon	Mount Lemmon Survey	NYS	800 m	MPC · JPL
854236	2010 AL_{13}	—	January 7, 2010	Kitt Peak	Spacewatch	EOS	1.2 km	MPC · JPL
854237	2010 AV_{13}	—	January 7, 2010	Kitt Peak	Spacewatch	·	730 m	MPC · JPL
854238	2010 AW_{14}	—	January 7, 2010	Mount Lemmon	Mount Lemmon Survey	·	730 m	MPC · JPL
854239	2010 AY_{14}	—	January 7, 2010	Mount Lemmon	Mount Lemmon Survey	·	1.4 km	MPC · JPL
854240	2010 AF_{15}	—	January 7, 2010	Mount Lemmon	Mount Lemmon Survey	·	1.1 km	MPC · JPL
854241	2010 AT_{19}	—	October 1, 2005	Mount Lemmon	Mount Lemmon Survey	NYS	720 m	MPC · JPL
854242	2010 AA_{33}	—	February 21, 2007	Mount Lemmon	Mount Lemmon Survey	·	560 m	MPC · JPL
854243	2010 AG_{42}	—	January 6, 2010	Mount Lemmon	Mount Lemmon Survey	·	2.2 km	MPC · JPL
854244	2010 AS_{47}	—	January 8, 2010	Kitt Peak	Spacewatch	·	1.1 km	MPC · JPL
854245	2010 AG_{50}	—	January 8, 2010	Kitt Peak	Spacewatch	·	1.4 km	MPC · JPL
854246	2010 AL_{50}	—	January 8, 2010	Kitt Peak	Spacewatch	·	1.3 km	MPC · JPL
854247	2010 AW_{62}	—	November 20, 2009	Kitt Peak	Spacewatch	·	770 m	MPC · JPL
854248	2010 AE_{69}	—	November 21, 2009	Mount Lemmon	Mount Lemmon Survey	·	1.3 km	MPC · JPL
854249	2010 AT_{79}	—	January 12, 2010	Kitt Peak	Spacewatch	·	1.2 km	MPC · JPL
854250	2010 AS_{142}	—	January 7, 2010	Kitt Peak	Spacewatch	·	860 m	MPC · JPL
854251	2010 AP_{145}	—	September 18, 2009	Kitt Peak	Spacewatch	DOR	1.7 km	MPC · JPL
854252	2010 AT_{146}	—	January 4, 2016	Haleakala	Pan-STARRS 1	·	1.9 km	MPC · JPL
854253	2010 AD_{151}	—	November 3, 2005	Kitt Peak	Spacewatch	·	820 m	MPC · JPL
854254	2010 AK_{151}	—	September 20, 2009	Mount Lemmon	Mount Lemmon Survey	·	2.4 km	MPC · JPL
854255	2010 AO_{155}	—	May 22, 2014	Mount Lemmon	Mount Lemmon Survey	·	470 m	MPC · JPL
854256	2010 AZ_{155}	—	February 16, 2015	Haleakala	Pan-STARRS 1	·	1.2 km	MPC · JPL
854257	2010 AA_{159}	—	January 7, 2010	Kitt Peak	Spacewatch	·	1.5 km	MPC · JPL
854258	2010 AP_{160}	—	July 9, 2016	Haleakala	Pan-STARRS 1	·	1.6 km	MPC · JPL
854259	2010 AR_{160}	—	September 19, 2014	Haleakala	Pan-STARRS 1	THM	1.8 km	MPC · JPL
854260	2010 AD_{161}	—	September 23, 2012	Kitt Peak	Spacewatch	·	460 m	MPC · JPL
854261	2010 AH_{161}	—	January 20, 2015	Haleakala	Pan-STARRS 1	·	1.2 km	MPC · JPL
854262	2010 AB_{162}	—	January 11, 2010	Kitt Peak	Spacewatch	·	1.2 km	MPC · JPL
854263	2010 AA_{163}	—	January 11, 2010	Kitt Peak	Spacewatch	·	1.1 km	MPC · JPL
854264	2010 AB_{164}	—	January 11, 2010	Kitt Peak	Spacewatch	JUN	760 m	MPC · JPL
854265	2010 BT_{2}	—	January 20, 2010	Siding Spring	SSS	·	1.2 km	MPC · JPL
854266	2010 BB_{133}	—	March 18, 2010	Kitt Peak	Spacewatch	·	2.4 km	MPC · JPL
854267	2010 BK_{135}	—	November 21, 2017	Haleakala	Pan-STARRS 1	·	1.4 km	MPC · JPL
854268	2010 BB_{138}	—	May 20, 2015	Cerro Tololo	DECam	·	730 m	MPC · JPL
854269	2010 BP_{142}	—	October 30, 2017	Haleakala	Pan-STARRS 1	·	1.2 km	MPC · JPL
854270	2010 BT_{143}	—	January 17, 2015	Mount Lemmon	Mount Lemmon Survey	·	1.1 km	MPC · JPL
854271	2010 BV_{153}	—	November 29, 2014	Mount Lemmon	Mount Lemmon Survey	·	1.2 km	MPC · JPL
854272	2010 CH	—	January 8, 2010	Kitt Peak	Spacewatch	H	490 m	MPC · JPL
854273	2010 CC_{3}	—	February 5, 2010	Kitt Peak	Spacewatch	·	950 m	MPC · JPL
854274	2010 CV_{3}	—	January 11, 2010	Kitt Peak	Spacewatch	·	550 m	MPC · JPL
854275	2010 CL_{18}	—	February 13, 2010	Catalina	CSS	AMO +1km	800 m	MPC · JPL
854276	2010 CE_{20}	—	February 9, 2010	Kitt Peak	Spacewatch	·	520 m	MPC · JPL
854277	2010 CV_{26}	—	February 9, 2010	Mount Lemmon	Mount Lemmon Survey	·	480 m	MPC · JPL
854278	2010 CO_{27}	—	February 25, 2006	Kitt Peak	Spacewatch	·	920 m	MPC · JPL
854279	2010 CE_{28}	—	January 11, 2010	Kitt Peak	Spacewatch	·	2.2 km	MPC · JPL
854280	2010 CB_{30}	—	February 9, 2010	Mount Lemmon	Mount Lemmon Survey	·	790 m	MPC · JPL
854281	2010 CD_{37}	—	February 13, 2010	Kitt Peak	Spacewatch	·	1.3 km	MPC · JPL
854282	2010 CH_{37}	—	February 13, 2010	Mount Lemmon	Mount Lemmon Survey	·	1.1 km	MPC · JPL
854283	2010 CA_{64}	—	February 9, 2010	Mount Lemmon	Mount Lemmon Survey	EUP	3.0 km	MPC · JPL
854284	2010 CF_{71}	—	February 13, 2010	Mount Lemmon	Mount Lemmon Survey	URS	2.4 km	MPC · JPL
854285	2010 CL_{72}	—	October 28, 2005	Mount Lemmon	Mount Lemmon Survey	NYS	780 m	MPC · JPL
854286	2010 CM_{83}	—	February 14, 2010	Mount Lemmon	Mount Lemmon Survey	·	1.9 km	MPC · JPL
854287	2010 CH_{84}	—	January 8, 2010	Mount Lemmon	Mount Lemmon Survey	·	1.4 km	MPC · JPL
854288	2010 CM_{84}	—	February 14, 2010	Kitt Peak	Spacewatch	·	490 m	MPC · JPL
854289	2010 CX_{90}	—	November 1, 2005	Mount Lemmon	Mount Lemmon Survey	·	770 m	MPC · JPL
854290	2010 CF_{92}	—	February 14, 2010	Mount Lemmon	Mount Lemmon Survey	·	1.9 km	MPC · JPL
854291	2010 CA_{98}	—	February 14, 2010	Mount Lemmon	Mount Lemmon Survey	·	550 m	MPC · JPL
854292	2010 CB_{98}	—	February 14, 2010	Mount Lemmon	Mount Lemmon Survey	·	1.4 km	MPC · JPL
854293	2010 CH_{98}	—	February 14, 2010	Mount Lemmon	Mount Lemmon Survey	·	650 m	MPC · JPL
854294	2010 CU_{100}	—	February 14, 2010	Mount Lemmon	Mount Lemmon Survey	·	990 m	MPC · JPL
854295	2010 CL_{105}	—	February 14, 2010	Mount Lemmon	Mount Lemmon Survey	·	580 m	MPC · JPL
854296	2010 CL_{108}	—	February 14, 2010	Mount Lemmon	Mount Lemmon Survey	H	390 m	MPC · JPL
854297	2010 CT_{111}	—	February 14, 2010	Mount Lemmon	Mount Lemmon Survey	·	2.0 km	MPC · JPL
854298	2010 CW_{118}	—	February 15, 2010	Mount Lemmon	Mount Lemmon Survey	EOS	1.4 km	MPC · JPL
854299	2010 CA_{119}	—	February 15, 2010	Mount Lemmon	Mount Lemmon Survey	·	2.3 km	MPC · JPL
854300	2010 CT_{126}	—	February 15, 2010	Mount Lemmon	Mount Lemmon Survey	EOS	1.2 km	MPC · JPL

== 854301–854400 ==
back to top

Designation			Discovery			Properties		Ref
Permanent	Provisional	Named after	Date	Site	Discoverer(s)	Category	Diam.	Ref
854301	2010 CU_{126}	—	February 15, 2010	Mount Lemmon	Mount Lemmon Survey	·	520 m	MPC · JPL
854302	2010 CL_{137}	—	February 6, 2010	Mount Lemmon	Mount Lemmon Survey	·	980 m	MPC · JPL
854303	2010 CZ_{147}	—	February 13, 2010	Mount Lemmon	Mount Lemmon Survey	·	1.1 km	MPC · JPL
854304	2010 CN_{154}	—	February 15, 2010	Kitt Peak	Spacewatch	·	2.3 km	MPC · JPL
854305	2010 CR_{161}	—	February 6, 2010	Kitt Peak	Spacewatch	·	450 m	MPC · JPL
854306	2010 CM_{162}	—	February 9, 2010	Kitt Peak	Spacewatch	·	840 m	MPC · JPL
854307	2010 CB_{167}	—	February 14, 2010	Mount Lemmon	Mount Lemmon Survey	·	510 m	MPC · JPL
854308	2010 CA_{168}	—	February 15, 2010	Mount Lemmon	Mount Lemmon Survey	·	1.3 km	MPC · JPL
854309	2010 CL_{170}	—	February 10, 2010	Kitt Peak	Spacewatch	·	890 m	MPC · JPL
854310	2010 CP_{172}	—	February 5, 2010	Kitt Peak	Spacewatch	H	410 m	MPC · JPL
854311	2010 CR_{172}	—	March 3, 2005	Kitt Peak	Spacewatch	·	1.5 km	MPC · JPL
854312	2010 CF_{174}	—	January 6, 2010	Kitt Peak	Spacewatch	·	1.4 km	MPC · JPL
854313	2010 CY_{175}	—	February 9, 2010	Mount Lemmon	Mount Lemmon Survey	·	860 m	MPC · JPL
854314	2010 CX_{179}	—	February 15, 2010	Catalina	CSS	·	950 m	MPC · JPL
854315	2010 CB_{257}	—	May 12, 2010	Mount Lemmon	Mount Lemmon Survey	·	1.6 km	MPC · JPL
854316	2010 CM_{270}	—	December 20, 2009	Kitt Peak	Spacewatch	EUN	910 m	MPC · JPL
854317	2010 CV_{270}	—	October 30, 2013	Kitt Peak	Spacewatch	·	1.2 km	MPC · JPL
854318	2010 CU_{271}	—	December 18, 2014	Haleakala	Pan-STARRS 1	H	400 m	MPC · JPL
854319	2010 CW_{273}	—	April 5, 2016	Haleakala	Pan-STARRS 1	·	1.8 km	MPC · JPL
854320	2010 CX_{273}	—	March 20, 2015	Haleakala	Pan-STARRS 1	(18466)	1.5 km	MPC · JPL
854321	2010 CN_{274}	—	February 15, 2010	Kitt Peak	Spacewatch	V	390 m	MPC · JPL
854322	2010 CS_{275}	—	February 14, 2010	Mount Lemmon	Mount Lemmon Survey	·	2.3 km	MPC · JPL
854323	2010 CG_{276}	—	April 30, 2011	Haleakala	Pan-STARRS 1	·	1.5 km	MPC · JPL
854324	2010 CJ_{276}	—	September 2, 2011	Haleakala	Pan-STARRS 1	·	550 m	MPC · JPL
854325	2010 CD_{277}	—	February 15, 2010	Mount Lemmon	Mount Lemmon Survey	·	510 m	MPC · JPL
854326	2010 DS_{2}	—	February 16, 2010	Mount Lemmon	Mount Lemmon Survey	·	1 km	MPC · JPL
854327	2010 DE_{3}	—	September 29, 2008	Mount Lemmon	Mount Lemmon Survey	·	1.3 km	MPC · JPL
854328	2010 DF_{6}	—	September 17, 2003	Kitt Peak	Spacewatch	·	1.0 km	MPC · JPL
854329	2010 DV_{10}	—	February 16, 2010	Mount Lemmon	Mount Lemmon Survey	H	380 m	MPC · JPL
854330	2010 DM_{12}	—	February 16, 2010	Catalina	CSS	H	550 m	MPC · JPL
854331	2010 DA_{36}	—	February 16, 2010	Kitt Peak	Spacewatch	·	1.7 km	MPC · JPL
854332	2010 DX_{38}	—	February 16, 2010	Kitt Peak	Spacewatch	·	690 m	MPC · JPL
854333	2010 DU_{39}	—	February 16, 2010	Mount Lemmon	Mount Lemmon Survey	·	990 m	MPC · JPL
854334	2010 DY_{39}	—	February 16, 2010	Catalina	CSS	JUN	800 m	MPC · JPL
854335	2010 DO_{43}	—	February 17, 2010	Kitt Peak	Spacewatch	·	2.2 km	MPC · JPL
854336	2010 DD_{44}	—	February 6, 2010	Kitt Peak	Spacewatch	·	1.1 km	MPC · JPL
854337	2010 DU_{46}	—	February 17, 2010	Kitt Peak	Spacewatch	·	630 m	MPC · JPL
854338	2010 DF_{48}	—	February 17, 2010	Mount Lemmon	Mount Lemmon Survey	·	1.1 km	MPC · JPL
854339	2010 DH_{95}	—	February 17, 2010	WISE	WISE	·	2.2 km	MPC · JPL
854340	2010 DD_{97}	—	October 1, 2014	Catalina	CSS	·	1.3 km	MPC · JPL
854341	2010 DN_{103}	—	February 26, 2010	WISE	WISE	URS	2.2 km	MPC · JPL
854342	2010 DY_{107}	—	May 6, 2014	Haleakala	Pan-STARRS 1	·	430 m	MPC · JPL
854343	2010 DE_{108}	—	August 15, 2013	Haleakala	Pan-STARRS 1	·	2.2 km	MPC · JPL
854344	2010 DO_{108}	—	February 20, 2010	Kitt Peak	Spacewatch	·	2.2 km	MPC · JPL
854345	2010 DA_{109}	—	February 18, 2010	Mount Lemmon	Mount Lemmon Survey	·	1.2 km	MPC · JPL
854346	2010 DE_{109}	—	February 9, 2014	Mount Lemmon	Mount Lemmon Survey	·	830 m	MPC · JPL
854347	2010 DM_{109}	—	March 20, 2014	Mount Lemmon	Mount Lemmon Survey	NYS	820 m	MPC · JPL
854348	2010 DG_{110}	—	May 18, 2015	Haleakala	Pan-STARRS 1	·	1.1 km	MPC · JPL
854349	2010 DY_{110}	—	December 13, 2012	Mount Lemmon	Mount Lemmon Survey	·	540 m	MPC · JPL
854350	2010 DC_{111}	—	January 15, 2016	Haleakala	Pan-STARRS 1	·	3.1 km	MPC · JPL
854351	2010 DB_{113}	—	February 17, 2010	Kitt Peak	Spacewatch	·	440 m	MPC · JPL
854352	2010 DL_{113}	—	February 17, 2010	Kitt Peak	Spacewatch	·	860 m	MPC · JPL
854353	2010 DJ_{114}	—	February 17, 2010	Kitt Peak	Spacewatch	·	490 m	MPC · JPL
854354	2010 DM_{114}	—	February 17, 2010	Mount Lemmon	Mount Lemmon Survey	·	890 m	MPC · JPL
854355	2010 DJ_{115}	—	February 16, 2010	Mount Lemmon	Mount Lemmon Survey	·	1.1 km	MPC · JPL
854356	2010 DW_{115}	—	February 17, 2010	Kitt Peak	Spacewatch	·	970 m	MPC · JPL
854357	2010 DG_{116}	—	February 17, 2010	Kitt Peak	Spacewatch	·	1.2 km	MPC · JPL
854358	2010 DS_{116}	—	February 17, 2010	Kitt Peak	Spacewatch	·	1.2 km	MPC · JPL
854359	2010 EN_{40}	—	January 8, 2010	Mount Lemmon	Mount Lemmon Survey	·	1.5 km	MPC · JPL
854360	2010 EZ_{41}	—	March 12, 2010	Mount Lemmon	Mount Lemmon Survey	·	740 m	MPC · JPL
854361	2010 EU_{43}	—	February 18, 2010	Kitt Peak	Spacewatch	·	1.9 km	MPC · JPL
854362	2010 EJ_{67}	—	March 12, 2010	Mount Lemmon	Mount Lemmon Survey	·	820 m	MPC · JPL
854363	2010 EY_{72}	—	February 18, 2010	Mount Lemmon	Mount Lemmon Survey	MAS	450 m	MPC · JPL
854364	2010 EG_{73}	—	February 18, 2010	Mount Lemmon	Mount Lemmon Survey	·	1.1 km	MPC · JPL
854365	2010 EV_{83}	—	January 12, 2010	Kitt Peak	Spacewatch	JUN	700 m	MPC · JPL
854366	2010 EU_{86}	—	February 19, 2010	Kitt Peak	Spacewatch	EOS	1.4 km	MPC · JPL
854367	2010 EV_{88}	—	March 14, 2010	Mount Lemmon	Mount Lemmon Survey	H	420 m	MPC · JPL
854368	2010 EV_{89}	—	March 14, 2010	Kitt Peak	Spacewatch	·	850 m	MPC · JPL
854369	2010 ET_{92}	—	March 14, 2010	Kitt Peak	Spacewatch	·	2.0 km	MPC · JPL
854370	2010 EZ_{100}	—	April 5, 2003	Kitt Peak	Spacewatch	NYS	610 m	MPC · JPL
854371	2010 ED_{101}	—	March 15, 2010	Kitt Peak	Spacewatch	·	670 m	MPC · JPL
854372	2010 EJ_{121}	—	March 15, 2010	Kitt Peak	Spacewatch	HNS	790 m	MPC · JPL
854373	2010 ER_{124}	—	March 12, 2010	Mount Lemmon	Mount Lemmon Survey	PHO	600 m	MPC · JPL
854374	2010 EV_{124}	—	March 4, 2010	Kitt Peak	Spacewatch	·	520 m	MPC · JPL
854375	2010 EZ_{127}	—	March 21, 2010	Catalina	CSS	·	1.4 km	MPC · JPL
854376	2010 EZ_{131}	—	March 15, 2010	Mount Lemmon	Mount Lemmon Survey	H	450 m	MPC · JPL
854377	2010 EA_{181}	—	January 23, 2015	Haleakala	Pan-STARRS 1	·	1.3 km	MPC · JPL
854378	2010 EM_{187}	—	March 15, 2010	WISE	WISE	(895)	2.5 km	MPC · JPL
854379	2010 EK_{188}	—	March 15, 2010	Mount Lemmon	Mount Lemmon Survey	H	370 m	MPC · JPL
854380	2010 ET_{188}	—	March 13, 2010	Mount Lemmon	Mount Lemmon Survey	·	830 m	MPC · JPL
854381	2010 EJ_{189}	—	February 14, 2010	Kitt Peak	Spacewatch	·	1.2 km	MPC · JPL
854382	2010 ED_{190}	—	October 15, 2012	Mount Lemmon	Mount Lemmon Survey	·	1.1 km	MPC · JPL
854383	2010 EE_{190}	—	March 5, 2010	Kitt Peak	Spacewatch	·	1.4 km	MPC · JPL
854384	2010 EK_{190}	—	March 12, 2010	Kitt Peak	Spacewatch	·	2.4 km	MPC · JPL
854385	2010 EV_{190}	—	March 13, 2010	Kitt Peak	Spacewatch	·	540 m	MPC · JPL
854386	2010 EO_{191}	—	March 13, 2010	Mount Lemmon	Mount Lemmon Survey	MAS	540 m	MPC · JPL
854387	2010 EN_{192}	—	March 12, 2010	Mount Lemmon	Mount Lemmon Survey	·	1.0 km	MPC · JPL
854388	2010 FW_{17}	—	March 18, 2010	Mount Lemmon	Mount Lemmon Survey	·	2.2 km	MPC · JPL
854389	2010 FB_{24}	—	March 18, 2010	Mount Lemmon	Mount Lemmon Survey	PAD	1.1 km	MPC · JPL
854390	2010 FG_{24}	—	March 18, 2010	Mount Lemmon	Mount Lemmon Survey	·	1.5 km	MPC · JPL
854391	2010 FJ_{54}	—	February 16, 2010	Mount Lemmon	Mount Lemmon Survey	·	880 m	MPC · JPL
854392	2010 FD_{97}	—	March 16, 2010	Kitt Peak	Spacewatch	·	1.2 km	MPC · JPL
854393	2010 FT_{100}	—	March 13, 2010	Mount Lemmon	Mount Lemmon Survey	MAS	580 m	MPC · JPL
854394	2010 FE_{129}	—	December 20, 2009	Mount Lemmon	Mount Lemmon Survey	·	970 m	MPC · JPL
854395	2010 FE_{133}	—	December 17, 2009	Kitt Peak	Spacewatch	·	1.8 km	MPC · JPL
854396	2010 FB_{138}	—	June 30, 2014	Haleakala	Pan-STARRS 1	·	720 m	MPC · JPL
854397	2010 FQ_{138}	—	February 19, 2010	Kitt Peak	Spacewatch	(1547)	1.1 km	MPC · JPL
854398	2010 FX_{139}	—	September 23, 2011	Mount Lemmon	Mount Lemmon Survey	H	430 m	MPC · JPL
854399	2010 FK_{140}	—	March 18, 2010	Kitt Peak	Spacewatch	·	1.5 km	MPC · JPL
854400	2010 FD_{141}	—	October 8, 2012	Kitt Peak	Spacewatch	HNS	800 m	MPC · JPL

== 854401–854500 ==
back to top

Designation			Discovery			Properties		Ref
Permanent	Provisional	Named after	Date	Site	Discoverer(s)	Category	Diam.	Ref
854401	2010 FU_{141}	—	December 31, 2013	Mount Lemmon	Mount Lemmon Survey	·	1.2 km	MPC · JPL
854402	2010 FL_{142}	—	December 16, 2012	ESA OGS	ESA OGS	·	560 m	MPC · JPL
854403	2010 FR_{143}	—	March 21, 2010	Kitt Peak	Spacewatch	MAS	580 m	MPC · JPL
854404	2010 FF_{145}	—	March 19, 2010	Kitt Peak	Spacewatch	·	720 m	MPC · JPL
854405	2010 FA_{146}	—	March 18, 2010	Mount Lemmon	Mount Lemmon Survey	·	1.4 km	MPC · JPL
854406	2010 FX_{146}	—	March 18, 2010	Kitt Peak	Spacewatch	H	330 m	MPC · JPL
854407	2010 GZ_{25}	—	April 4, 2010	Kitt Peak	Spacewatch	NYS	740 m	MPC · JPL
854408	2010 GB_{33}	—	April 7, 2010	Calar Alto	DLR Institute of Planetary Research	H	340 m	MPC · JPL
854409	2010 GF_{34}	—	April 8, 2010	Kitt Peak	Spacewatch	·	790 m	MPC · JPL
854410	2010 GA_{35}	—	October 3, 2008	Mount Lemmon	Mount Lemmon Survey	BAR	800 m	MPC · JPL
854411	2010 GY_{100}	—	March 15, 2010	Kitt Peak	Spacewatch	·	500 m	MPC · JPL
854412	2010 GD_{101}	—	April 5, 2010	Kitt Peak	Spacewatch	H	390 m	MPC · JPL
854413	2010 GR_{104}	—	February 24, 2006	Mount Lemmon	Mount Lemmon Survey	MAS	460 m	MPC · JPL
854414	2010 GY_{108}	—	March 18, 2010	Kitt Peak	Spacewatch	·	510 m	MPC · JPL
854415	2010 GY_{110}	—	March 18, 2010	Kitt Peak	Spacewatch	·	1.6 km	MPC · JPL
854416	2010 GP_{117}	—	April 10, 2010	Mount Lemmon	Mount Lemmon Survey	·	510 m	MPC · JPL
854417	2010 GV_{119}	—	April 11, 2010	Mount Lemmon	Mount Lemmon Survey	THM	1.8 km	MPC · JPL
854418	2010 GB_{126}	—	April 10, 2010	Kitt Peak	Spacewatch	·	780 m	MPC · JPL
854419	2010 GD_{130}	—	April 7, 2010	Kitt Peak	Spacewatch	·	1.0 km	MPC · JPL
854420	2010 GC_{131}	—	April 9, 2010	Mount Lemmon	Mount Lemmon Survey	·	480 m	MPC · JPL
854421	2010 GW_{133}	—	April 12, 2010	Mount Lemmon	Mount Lemmon Survey	·	950 m	MPC · JPL
854422	2010 GG_{139}	—	January 8, 2010	Mount Lemmon	Mount Lemmon Survey	·	1.3 km	MPC · JPL
854423	2010 GT_{141}	—	April 9, 2010	Mount Lemmon	Mount Lemmon Survey	·	550 m	MPC · JPL
854424	2010 GN_{151}	—	April 15, 2010	WISE	WISE	·	980 m	MPC · JPL
854425	2010 GD_{181}	—	April 25, 2015	Haleakala	Pan-STARRS 1	KON	1.4 km	MPC · JPL
854426	2010 GH_{183}	—	September 24, 2017	Mount Lemmon	Mount Lemmon Survey	·	1.1 km	MPC · JPL
854427	2010 GN_{184}	—	September 12, 2013	Mount Lemmon	Mount Lemmon Survey	·	1.1 km	MPC · JPL
854428	2010 GS_{190}	—	March 12, 2016	Haleakala	Pan-STARRS 1	·	1.5 km	MPC · JPL
854429	2010 GB_{201}	—	April 10, 2010	Kitt Peak	Spacewatch	·	510 m	MPC · JPL
854430	2010 GT_{201}	—	April 15, 2010	Mount Lemmon	Mount Lemmon Survey	·	840 m	MPC · JPL
854431	2010 GO_{202}	—	April 10, 2010	Kitt Peak	Spacewatch	·	880 m	MPC · JPL
854432	2010 GP_{203}	—	April 14, 2010	Mount Lemmon	Mount Lemmon Survey	·	730 m	MPC · JPL
854433	2010 GG_{204}	—	April 12, 2010	Mount Lemmon	Mount Lemmon Survey	JUN	770 m	MPC · JPL
854434	2010 GT_{204}	—	April 15, 2010	Mount Lemmon	Mount Lemmon Survey	·	960 m	MPC · JPL
854435	2010 GT_{205}	—	January 20, 2015	Haleakala	Pan-STARRS 1	·	1.8 km	MPC · JPL
854436	2010 GB_{206}	—	September 21, 2011	Kitt Peak	Spacewatch	·	660 m	MPC · JPL
854437	2010 GS_{206}	—	April 12, 2010	Kitt Peak	Spacewatch	·	810 m	MPC · JPL
854438	2010 GV_{206}	—	April 9, 2010	Mount Lemmon	Mount Lemmon Survey	·	500 m	MPC · JPL
854439	2010 GV_{210}	—	April 9, 2010	Kitt Peak	Spacewatch	·	860 m	MPC · JPL
854440	2010 GW_{210}	—	April 15, 2010	Mount Lemmon	Mount Lemmon Survey	·	1.3 km	MPC · JPL
854441	2010 GZ_{210}	—	April 9, 2010	Kitt Peak	Spacewatch	MRX	740 m	MPC · JPL
854442	2010 GW_{212}	—	April 10, 2010	Kitt Peak	Spacewatch	MAR	750 m	MPC · JPL
854443	2010 GY_{212}	—	April 6, 2010	Mount Lemmon	Mount Lemmon Survey	·	610 m	MPC · JPL
854444	2010 GH_{213}	—	April 3, 2016	Haleakala	Pan-STARRS 1	·	1.9 km	MPC · JPL
854445	2010 HP_{23}	—	April 20, 2010	Mount Lemmon	Mount Lemmon Survey	JUN	1.0 km	MPC · JPL
854446	2010 HX_{32}	—	October 29, 2014	Haleakala	Pan-STARRS 1	LIX	2.1 km	MPC · JPL
854447	2010 HG_{78}	—	April 9, 2010	Kitt Peak	Spacewatch	·	480 m	MPC · JPL
854448	2010 HG_{79}	—	April 17, 2010	Bergisch Gladbach	W. Bickel	H	380 m	MPC · JPL
854449	2010 HN_{105}	—	April 20, 2010	Kitt Peak	Spacewatch	·	1.6 km	MPC · JPL
854450	2010 HJ_{106}	—	March 23, 2006	Kitt Peak	Spacewatch	·	810 m	MPC · JPL
854451	2010 HH_{117}	—	November 27, 2014	Haleakala	Pan-STARRS 1	·	2.4 km	MPC · JPL
854452	2010 HJ_{126}	—	February 6, 2016	Haleakala	Pan-STARRS 1	EUP	2.2 km	MPC · JPL
854453	2010 HC_{133}	—	September 2, 2010	Mount Lemmon	Mount Lemmon Survey	·	530 m	MPC · JPL
854454	2010 HH_{133}	—	July 7, 2015	Haleakala	Pan-STARRS 1	·	1.5 km	MPC · JPL
854455	2010 HO_{135}	—	April 29, 2010	WISE	WISE	·	1.8 km	MPC · JPL
854456	2010 HQ_{137}	—	February 13, 2010	Mount Lemmon	Mount Lemmon Survey	MIS	1.7 km	MPC · JPL
854457	2010 HW_{138}	—	October 23, 2011	Haleakala	Pan-STARRS 1	·	670 m	MPC · JPL
854458	2010 HP_{139}	—	March 24, 2015	Mount Lemmon	Mount Lemmon Survey	EOS	1.2 km	MPC · JPL
854459	2010 HQ_{139}	—	September 25, 2011	Haleakala	Pan-STARRS 1	V	430 m	MPC · JPL
854460	2010 JX_{28}	—	May 6, 2010	Mount Lemmon	Mount Lemmon Survey	H	470 m	MPC · JPL
854461	2010 JS_{30}	—	May 5, 2010	Mount Lemmon	Mount Lemmon Survey	·	1.5 km	MPC · JPL
854462	2010 JT_{33}	—	May 4, 2010	Catalina	CSS	·	1.8 km	MPC · JPL
854463	2010 JZ_{38}	—	May 5, 2010	Mount Lemmon	Mount Lemmon Survey	·	1.5 km	MPC · JPL
854464	2010 JZ_{48}	—	May 7, 2010	Kitt Peak	Spacewatch	·	1.4 km	MPC · JPL
854465	2010 JT_{79}	—	May 12, 2010	Kitt Peak	Spacewatch	·	1.5 km	MPC · JPL
854466	2010 JG_{82}	—	May 11, 2010	Mount Lemmon	Mount Lemmon Survey	·	480 m	MPC · JPL
854467	2010 JV_{148}	—	October 23, 2008	Mount Lemmon	Mount Lemmon Survey	·	1.1 km	MPC · JPL
854468	2010 JC_{152}	—	April 10, 2010	Kitt Peak	Spacewatch	·	1.3 km	MPC · JPL
854469	2010 JA_{158}	—	May 13, 2010	Mount Lemmon	Mount Lemmon Survey	·	950 m	MPC · JPL
854470	2010 JR_{163}	—	May 9, 2010	Mount Lemmon	Mount Lemmon Survey	·	510 m	MPC · JPL
854471	2010 JB_{168}	—	May 12, 2010	Mount Lemmon	Mount Lemmon Survey	H	390 m	MPC · JPL
854472	2010 JN_{171}	—	April 9, 2010	Kitt Peak	Spacewatch	·	880 m	MPC · JPL
854473	2010 JB_{175}	—	May 11, 2010	Kitt Peak	Spacewatch	EUN	1 km	MPC · JPL
854474	2010 JH_{175}	—	May 12, 2010	Mount Lemmon	Mount Lemmon Survey	EUN	860 m	MPC · JPL
854475	2010 JJ_{179}	—	March 19, 2010	Mount Lemmon	Mount Lemmon Survey	·	1.1 km	MPC · JPL
854476	2010 JL_{180}	—	May 1, 2010	WISE	WISE	L5	6.8 km	MPC · JPL
854477	2010 JX_{184}	—	May 4, 2010	WISE	WISE	EUP	2.8 km	MPC · JPL
854478	2010 JZ_{185}	—	May 4, 2010	WISE	WISE	T_{j} (2.98)	3.1 km	MPC · JPL
854479	2010 JW_{191}	—	July 23, 2015	Haleakala	Pan-STARRS 1	·	1.4 km	MPC · JPL
854480	2010 JD_{193}	—	October 6, 2016	Mount Lemmon	Mount Lemmon Survey	·	2.2 km	MPC · JPL
854481	2010 JT_{212}	—	January 14, 2015	Haleakala	Pan-STARRS 1	H	400 m	MPC · JPL
854482	2010 JX_{212}	—	October 24, 2011	Haleakala	Pan-STARRS 1	·	800 m	MPC · JPL
854483	2010 JW_{213}	—	February 22, 2014	Kitt Peak	Spacewatch	·	1.2 km	MPC · JPL
854484	2010 JX_{213}	—	April 1, 2017	Haleakala	Pan-STARRS 1	·	510 m	MPC · JPL
854485	2010 JZ_{213}	—	March 22, 2018	Mount Lemmon	Mount Lemmon Survey	·	1.1 km	MPC · JPL
854486	2010 JB_{214}	—	October 10, 2016	Haleakala	Pan-STARRS 1	H	380 m	MPC · JPL
854487	2010 JA_{216}	—	May 11, 2010	Kitt Peak	Spacewatch	JUN	810 m	MPC · JPL
854488	2010 KL_{10}	—	April 10, 2010	Mount Lemmon	Mount Lemmon Survey	·	930 m	MPC · JPL
854489	2010 KD_{38}	—	May 17, 2010	Kitt Peak	Spacewatch	·	1.6 km	MPC · JPL
854490	2010 KW_{142}	—	September 16, 2010	Mount Lemmon	Mount Lemmon Survey	·	1.9 km	MPC · JPL
854491	2010 KB_{152}	—	July 19, 2015	Haleakala	Pan-STARRS 1	·	1.6 km	MPC · JPL
854492	2010 KF_{157}	—	May 19, 2010	Mount Lemmon	Mount Lemmon Survey	·	490 m	MPC · JPL
854493	2010 KC_{158}	—	May 20, 2010	Mount Lemmon	Mount Lemmon Survey	·	1.1 km	MPC · JPL
854494	2010 KD_{158}	—	September 23, 2011	Haleakala	Pan-STARRS 1	·	880 m	MPC · JPL
854495	2010 KM_{158}	—	March 6, 2013	Haleakala	Pan-STARRS 1	·	490 m	MPC · JPL
854496	2010 KP_{159}	—	May 19, 2010	Mount Lemmon	Mount Lemmon Survey	·	2.4 km	MPC · JPL
854497	2010 LR	—	April 20, 2010	Mount Lemmon	Mount Lemmon Survey	·	520 m	MPC · JPL
854498	2010 LP_{14}	—	June 3, 2010	Kitt Peak	Spacewatch	·	1.1 km	MPC · JPL
854499	2010 LA_{34}	—	May 7, 2010	Mount Lemmon	Mount Lemmon Survey	·	920 m	MPC · JPL
854500	2010 LU_{62}	—	June 5, 2010	ESA OGS	ESA OGS	·	980 m	MPC · JPL

== 854501–854600 ==
back to top

Designation			Discovery			Properties		Ref
Permanent	Provisional	Named after	Date	Site	Discoverer(s)	Category	Diam.	Ref
854501	2010 LA_{63}	—	June 10, 2010	Kitt Peak	Spacewatch	·	720 m	MPC · JPL
854502	2010 LN_{64}	—	May 19, 2010	Mount Lemmon	Mount Lemmon Survey	·	780 m	MPC · JPL
854503	2010 LN_{65}	—	June 14, 2010	Mount Lemmon	Mount Lemmon Survey	H	340 m	MPC · JPL
854504	2010 LH_{106}	—	June 15, 2010	Kitt Peak	Spacewatch	·	500 m	MPC · JPL
854505	2010 LR_{112}	—	June 13, 2010	Mount Lemmon	Mount Lemmon Survey	·	1.0 km	MPC · JPL
854506	2010 LQ_{133}	—	June 6, 2010	ESA OGS	ESA OGS	·	950 m	MPC · JPL
854507	2010 LD_{142}	—	April 23, 2015	Haleakala	Pan-STARRS 1	·	1.2 km	MPC · JPL
854508	2010 LN_{143}	—	April 11, 2016	Haleakala	Pan-STARRS 1	LIX	2.8 km	MPC · JPL
854509	2010 LB_{150}	—	March 27, 2017	Haleakala	Pan-STARRS 1	·	1.0 km	MPC · JPL
854510	2010 LC_{151}	—	June 8, 2015	Haleakala	Pan-STARRS 1	·	1.2 km	MPC · JPL
854511	2010 LK_{158}	—	November 4, 2012	Kitt Peak	Spacewatch	EUP	2.7 km	MPC · JPL
854512	2010 LZ_{158}	—	February 10, 2014	Haleakala	Pan-STARRS 1	·	1.5 km	MPC · JPL
854513	2010 LE_{159}	—	June 14, 2010	Mount Lemmon	Mount Lemmon Survey	·	970 m	MPC · JPL
854514	2010 LQ_{159}	—	June 13, 2010	Mount Lemmon	Mount Lemmon Survey	·	760 m	MPC · JPL
854515	2010 MQ_{113}	—	June 22, 2010	Mount Lemmon	Mount Lemmon Survey	PHO	760 m	MPC · JPL
854516	2010 MK_{114}	—	June 21, 2010	Mount Lemmon	Mount Lemmon Survey	·	1.4 km	MPC · JPL
854517	2010 ML_{120}	—	December 15, 2006	Kitt Peak	Spacewatch	·	1.6 km	MPC · JPL
854518	2010 MH_{127}	—	June 22, 2010	WISE	WISE	DOR	1.6 km	MPC · JPL
854519	2010 MV_{131}	—	July 25, 2015	Haleakala	Pan-STARRS 1	·	1.3 km	MPC · JPL
854520	2010 MG_{132}	—	January 14, 2018	Haleakala	Pan-STARRS 1	·	1.0 km	MPC · JPL
854521	2010 MY_{141}	—	July 24, 2015	Haleakala	Pan-STARRS 1	·	1.8 km	MPC · JPL
854522	2010 MX_{147}	—	June 19, 2010	Mount Lemmon	Mount Lemmon Survey	·	970 m	MPC · JPL
854523	2010 ME_{148}	—	September 3, 2014	Mount Lemmon	Mount Lemmon Survey	PHO	620 m	MPC · JPL
854524	2010 MG_{148}	—	June 30, 2014	Haleakala	Pan-STARRS 1	·	840 m	MPC · JPL
854525	2010 MS_{148}	—	September 23, 2015	Haleakala	Pan-STARRS 1	·	1.3 km	MPC · JPL
854526	2010 MB_{149}	—	June 21, 2010	Mount Lemmon	Mount Lemmon Survey	TIN	670 m	MPC · JPL
854527	2010 MG_{149}	—	August 13, 2015	Haleakala	Pan-STARRS 1	·	1.3 km	MPC · JPL
854528	2010 MK_{149}	—	March 5, 2017	Haleakala	Pan-STARRS 1	·	690 m	MPC · JPL
854529	2010 MQ_{149}	—	June 21, 2010	Mount Lemmon	Mount Lemmon Survey	JUN	670 m	MPC · JPL
854530	2010 MO_{150}	—	June 18, 2010	Mount Lemmon	Mount Lemmon Survey	·	630 m	MPC · JPL
854531	2010 MF_{151}	—	June 19, 2010	Mount Lemmon	Mount Lemmon Survey	·	880 m	MPC · JPL
854532	2010 NX_{3}	—	June 17, 2010	Mount Lemmon	Mount Lemmon Survey	·	970 m	MPC · JPL
854533	2010 NL_{38}	—	July 8, 2010	WISE	WISE	·	1.7 km	MPC · JPL
854534	2010 NU_{49}	—	March 18, 2010	Kitt Peak	Spacewatch	·	1.3 km	MPC · JPL
854535	2010 NJ_{64}	—	July 11, 2010	WISE	WISE	·	1.6 km	MPC · JPL
854536	2010 NH_{66}	—	June 18, 2010	Mount Lemmon	Mount Lemmon Survey	NYS	880 m	MPC · JPL
854537	2010 NR_{107}	—	March 19, 2010	Kitt Peak	Spacewatch	·	2.2 km	MPC · JPL
854538	2010 NN_{137}	—	July 11, 2010	WISE	WISE	·	1.3 km	MPC · JPL
854539	2010 NL_{144}	—	November 11, 2006	Kitt Peak	Spacewatch	THB	2.6 km	MPC · JPL
854540	2010 NZ_{146}	—	May 6, 2014	Haleakala	Pan-STARRS 1	·	1.7 km	MPC · JPL
854541	2010 NA_{147}	—	July 4, 2010	Mount Lemmon	Mount Lemmon Survey	·	750 m	MPC · JPL
854542	2010 NG_{148}	—	July 4, 2010	Mount Lemmon	Mount Lemmon Survey	EOS	1.3 km	MPC · JPL
854543	2010 OD_{150}	—	August 1, 2017	Haleakala	Pan-STARRS 1	·	2.4 km	MPC · JPL
854544	2010 OF_{153}	—	December 24, 2014	Mount Lemmon	Mount Lemmon Survey	·	570 m	MPC · JPL
854545	2010 OK_{153}	—	October 4, 1999	Kitt Peak	Spacewatch	·	1.9 km	MPC · JPL
854546	2010 PM_{24}	—	June 20, 2010	Mount Lemmon	Mount Lemmon Survey	MAS	630 m	MPC · JPL
854547	2010 PO_{57}	—	October 4, 2006	Mount Lemmon	Mount Lemmon Survey	·	1.2 km	MPC · JPL
854548	2010 PH_{60}	—	August 10, 2010	Kitt Peak	Spacewatch	·	790 m	MPC · JPL
854549	2010 PP_{60}	—	August 10, 2010	Kitt Peak	Spacewatch	·	810 m	MPC · JPL
854550	2010 PE_{62}	—	August 10, 2010	Kitt Peak	Spacewatch	NYS	760 m	MPC · JPL
854551	2010 PH_{74}	—	August 10, 2010	XuYi	PMO NEO Survey Program	·	1.1 km	MPC · JPL
854552	2010 PB_{75}	—	August 12, 2010	Kitt Peak	Spacewatch	·	1.1 km	MPC · JPL
854553	2010 PV_{75}	—	August 14, 2010	Kachina	Hobart, J.	·	1.5 km	MPC · JPL
854554	2010 PQ_{79}	—	August 12, 2010	Kitt Peak	Spacewatch	·	1.4 km	MPC · JPL
854555	2010 PE_{89}	—	August 12, 2010	Kitt Peak	Spacewatch	·	1.3 km	MPC · JPL
854556	2010 PU_{89}	—	August 10, 2010	Kitt Peak	Spacewatch	GEF	940 m	MPC · JPL
854557	2010 PV_{90}	—	August 14, 2010	Kitt Peak	Spacewatch	·	590 m	MPC · JPL
854558	2010 PY_{90}	—	August 12, 2010	Kitt Peak	Spacewatch	THM	1.6 km	MPC · JPL
854559	2010 PD_{91}	—	August 14, 2010	Kitt Peak	Spacewatch	·	430 m	MPC · JPL
854560	2010 PO_{92}	—	August 5, 2010	Kitt Peak	Spacewatch	·	710 m	MPC · JPL
854561	2010 PS_{93}	—	August 10, 2010	Kitt Peak	Spacewatch	·	1.1 km	MPC · JPL
854562	2010 QT_{3}	—	August 19, 2010	XuYi	PMO NEO Survey Program	NYS	1.0 km	MPC · JPL
854563	2010 QV_{5}	—	August 20, 2010	La Sagra	OAM	·	960 m	MPC · JPL
854564	2010 QF_{7}	—	September 16, 2010	Catalina	CSS	·	1.3 km	MPC · JPL
854565	2010 QH_{8}	—	August 19, 2010	XuYi	PMO NEO Survey Program	·	430 m	MPC · JPL
854566	2010 RH_{3}	—	August 30, 2010	La Sagra	OAM	·	1.2 km	MPC · JPL
854567	2010 RD_{6}	—	September 2, 2010	Mount Lemmon	Mount Lemmon Survey	·	860 m	MPC · JPL
854568	2010 RN_{6}	—	September 2, 2010	Mount Lemmon	Mount Lemmon Survey	·	880 m	MPC · JPL
854569	2010 RY_{6}	—	September 2, 2010	Mount Lemmon	Mount Lemmon Survey	·	1.5 km	MPC · JPL
854570	2010 RP_{8}	—	September 2, 2010	Mount Lemmon	Mount Lemmon Survey	·	1.6 km	MPC · JPL
854571	2010 RC_{9}	—	September 1, 2010	Socorro	LINEAR	·	2.2 km	MPC · JPL
854572	2010 RG_{11}	—	September 2, 2010	Mount Lemmon	Mount Lemmon Survey	·	1.5 km	MPC · JPL
854573	2010 RP_{22}	—	September 3, 2010	Mount Lemmon	Mount Lemmon Survey	URS	2.2 km	MPC · JPL
854574	2010 RJ_{25}	—	August 12, 2010	Kitt Peak	Spacewatch	·	800 m	MPC · JPL
854575	2010 RN_{27}	—	September 3, 2010	Mount Lemmon	Mount Lemmon Survey	NYS	710 m	MPC · JPL
854576	2010 RL_{29}	—	September 4, 2010	Mount Lemmon	Mount Lemmon Survey	·	1.9 km	MPC · JPL
854577	2010 RP_{29}	—	September 4, 2010	Mount Lemmon	Mount Lemmon Survey	·	510 m	MPC · JPL
854578	2010 RJ_{31}	—	July 6, 2010	Kitt Peak	Spacewatch	·	850 m	MPC · JPL
854579	2010 RT_{32}	—	September 1, 2010	Mount Lemmon	Mount Lemmon Survey	·	470 m	MPC · JPL
854580	2010 RF_{34}	—	October 16, 2006	Catalina	CSS	·	1.0 km	MPC · JPL
854581	2010 RK_{34}	—	September 2, 2010	Mount Lemmon	Mount Lemmon Survey	·	1.8 km	MPC · JPL
854582	2010 RA_{41}	—	September 3, 2010	Piszkés-tető	K. Sárneczky, Z. Kuli	V	390 m	MPC · JPL
854583	2010 RQ_{41}	—	November 22, 2006	Kitt Peak	Spacewatch	KOR	1.1 km	MPC · JPL
854584	2010 RY_{41}	—	September 2, 2010	Mount Lemmon	Mount Lemmon Survey	AGN	800 m	MPC · JPL
854585	2010 RZ_{42}	—	September 3, 2010	Piszkés-tető	K. Sárneczky, Z. Kuli	·	670 m	MPC · JPL
854586	2010 RM_{43}	—	October 3, 2003	Kitt Peak	Spacewatch	·	760 m	MPC · JPL
854587	2010 RR_{44}	—	September 2, 2010	Mount Lemmon	Mount Lemmon Survey	·	670 m	MPC · JPL
854588	2010 RH_{56}	—	September 5, 2010	Mount Lemmon	Mount Lemmon Survey	·	1.3 km	MPC · JPL
854589	2010 RG_{57}	—	September 5, 2010	Mount Lemmon	Mount Lemmon Survey	·	910 m	MPC · JPL
854590	2010 RH_{60}	—	September 6, 2010	Kitt Peak	Spacewatch	GEF	950 m	MPC · JPL
854591	2010 RC_{63}	—	August 20, 2010	La Sagra	OAM	·	1.2 km	MPC · JPL
854592	2010 RG_{63}	—	August 19, 2010	XuYi	PMO NEO Survey Program	(1547)	1.3 km	MPC · JPL
854593	2010 RM_{66}	—	September 4, 2010	Mount Lemmon	Mount Lemmon Survey	·	2.0 km	MPC · JPL
854594	2010 RZ_{67}	—	September 5, 2010	La Sagra	OAM	·	630 m	MPC · JPL
854595	2010 RS_{69}	—	September 6, 2010	Piszkés-tető	K. Sárneczky, Z. Kuli	·	1.9 km	MPC · JPL
854596	2010 RZ_{69}	—	September 7, 2010	Westfield	International Astronomical Search Collaboration	·	1.3 km	MPC · JPL
854597	2010 RW_{72}	—	September 10, 2010	Mount Lemmon	Mount Lemmon Survey	·	1.6 km	MPC · JPL
854598	2010 RV_{73}	—	September 10, 2010	Catalina	CSS	·	820 m	MPC · JPL
854599	2010 RC_{75}	—	September 5, 2010	Wildberg	R. Apitzsch	·	920 m	MPC · JPL
854600	2010 RB_{76}	—	September 1, 2010	Mount Lemmon	Mount Lemmon Survey	·	980 m	MPC · JPL

== 854601–854700 ==
back to top

Designation			Discovery			Properties		Ref
Permanent	Provisional	Named after	Date	Site	Discoverer(s)	Category	Diam.	Ref
854601	2010 RD_{78}	—	September 11, 2010	La Sagra	OAM	·	930 m	MPC · JPL
854602	2010 RQ_{79}	—	September 3, 2010	Mount Lemmon	Mount Lemmon Survey	·	1.3 km	MPC · JPL
854603	2010 RU_{79}	—	August 19, 2010	XuYi	PMO NEO Survey Program	BAR	970 m	MPC · JPL
854604	2010 RP_{86}	—	September 2, 2010	Mount Lemmon	Mount Lemmon Survey	·	460 m	MPC · JPL
854605	2010 RQ_{86}	—	September 2, 2010	Mount Lemmon	Mount Lemmon Survey	KOR	960 m	MPC · JPL
854606	2010 RY_{91}	—	September 10, 2010	Kitt Peak	Spacewatch	·	830 m	MPC · JPL
854607	2010 RL_{95}	—	September 12, 2010	Mount Lemmon	Mount Lemmon Survey	·	800 m	MPC · JPL
854608	2010 RC_{97}	—	September 10, 2010	La Sagra	OAM	·	500 m	MPC · JPL
854609	2010 RT_{97}	—	September 10, 2010	Kitt Peak	Spacewatch	·	800 m	MPC · JPL
854610	2010 RG_{98}	—	September 10, 2010	Kitt Peak	Spacewatch	·	1.1 km	MPC · JPL
854611	2010 RB_{103}	—	October 4, 2006	Mount Lemmon	Mount Lemmon Survey	·	1.1 km	MPC · JPL
854612	2010 RD_{106}	—	November 10, 1999	Kitt Peak	Spacewatch	·	770 m	MPC · JPL
854613	2010 RE_{107}	—	September 10, 2010	Kitt Peak	Spacewatch	PHO	690 m	MPC · JPL
854614	2010 RK_{109}	—	September 8, 1999	Catalina	CSS	H	510 m	MPC · JPL
854615	2010 RW_{115}	—	September 11, 2010	Kitt Peak	Spacewatch	·	880 m	MPC · JPL
854616	2010 RX_{116}	—	September 11, 2010	Kitt Peak	Spacewatch	·	780 m	MPC · JPL
854617	2010 RZ_{116}	—	September 11, 2010	Kitt Peak	Spacewatch	·	2.1 km	MPC · JPL
854618	2010 RH_{118}	—	September 11, 2010	Kitt Peak	Spacewatch	NYS	960 m	MPC · JPL
854619	2010 RM_{118}	—	October 9, 1999	Kitt Peak	Spacewatch	·	1.9 km	MPC · JPL
854620	2010 RP_{121}	—	September 12, 2010	Westfield	International Astronomical Search Collaboration	·	570 m	MPC · JPL
854621	2010 RS_{122}	—	September 10, 2010	Mount Lemmon	Mount Lemmon Survey	·	490 m	MPC · JPL
854622	2010 RM_{124}	—	September 11, 2010	Kitt Peak	Spacewatch	·	780 m	MPC · JPL
854623	2010 RW_{124}	—	October 17, 2006	Kitt Peak	Spacewatch	·	1.0 km	MPC · JPL
854624	2010 RX_{126}	—	August 28, 2006	Catalina	CSS	·	910 m	MPC · JPL
854625	2010 RW_{127}	—	September 14, 2010	Kitt Peak	Spacewatch	·	1.2 km	MPC · JPL
854626	2010 RG_{128}	—	September 14, 2010	Kitt Peak	Spacewatch	·	780 m	MPC · JPL
854627	2010 RT_{132}	—	September 15, 2010	Mount Lemmon	Mount Lemmon Survey	PHO	810 m	MPC · JPL
854628	2010 RJ_{133}	—	September 15, 2010	Catalina	CSS	·	520 m	MPC · JPL
854629	2010 RF_{136}	—	September 11, 2010	Kitt Peak	Spacewatch	·	850 m	MPC · JPL
854630	2010 RJ_{140}	—	September 12, 2010	ESA OGS	ESA OGS	·	440 m	MPC · JPL
854631	2010 RZ_{140}	—	September 1, 2010	Mount Lemmon	Mount Lemmon Survey	·	860 m	MPC · JPL
854632	2010 RC_{142}	—	January 30, 2008	Mount Lemmon	Mount Lemmon Survey	·	600 m	MPC · JPL
854633	2010 RH_{143}	—	September 19, 2001	Socorro	LINEAR	JUN	880 m	MPC · JPL
854634	2010 RT_{143}	—	September 14, 2010	Kitt Peak	Spacewatch	·	1.1 km	MPC · JPL
854635	2010 RQ_{144}	—	September 14, 2010	Kitt Peak	Spacewatch	·	700 m	MPC · JPL
854636	2010 RX_{145}	—	September 14, 2010	Kitt Peak	Spacewatch	NYS	880 m	MPC · JPL
854637	2010 RM_{146}	—	September 14, 2010	Kitt Peak	Spacewatch	·	1.8 km	MPC · JPL
854638	2010 RP_{146}	—	September 14, 2010	Kitt Peak	Spacewatch	·	490 m	MPC · JPL
854639	2010 RU_{146}	—	September 6, 2010	Kitt Peak	Spacewatch	V	440 m	MPC · JPL
854640	2010 RX_{148}	—	September 15, 2010	Kitt Peak	Spacewatch	·	1.2 km	MPC · JPL
854641	2010 RZ_{148}	—	September 15, 2010	Kitt Peak	Spacewatch	·	800 m	MPC · JPL
854642	2010 RM_{150}	—	September 15, 2010	Kitt Peak	Spacewatch	·	1.1 km	MPC · JPL
854643	2010 RL_{152}	—	March 11, 2005	Kitt Peak	Deep Ecliptic Survey	MAS	490 m	MPC · JPL
854644	2010 RT_{157}	—	September 19, 2014	Haleakala	Pan-STARRS 1	·	940 m	MPC · JPL
854645	2010 RO_{158}	—	September 2, 2010	Mount Lemmon	Mount Lemmon Survey	·	1.0 km	MPC · JPL
854646	2010 RR_{164}	—	September 6, 2010	Piszkés-tető	K. Sárneczky, Z. Kuli	EUN	810 m	MPC · JPL
854647	2010 RL_{165}	—	August 10, 2010	Kitt Peak	Spacewatch	·	720 m	MPC · JPL
854648	2010 RW_{169}	—	September 2, 2010	Mount Lemmon	Mount Lemmon Survey	·	650 m	MPC · JPL
854649	2010 RL_{170}	—	September 3, 2010	Mount Lemmon	Mount Lemmon Survey	·	550 m	MPC · JPL
854650	2010 RN_{170}	—	September 3, 2010	Mount Lemmon	Mount Lemmon Survey	·	630 m	MPC · JPL
854651	2010 RW_{177}	—	September 11, 2010	Kitt Peak	Spacewatch	·	720 m	MPC · JPL
854652	2010 RT_{189}	—	September 11, 2010	Mount Lemmon	Mount Lemmon Survey	·	1.0 km	MPC · JPL
854653	2010 RN_{192}	—	September 9, 2010	Kitt Peak	Spacewatch	NYS	910 m	MPC · JPL
854654	2010 RE_{194}	—	October 1, 2014	Haleakala	Pan-STARRS 1	·	960 m	MPC · JPL
854655	2010 RA_{195}	—	September 2, 2010	Mount Lemmon	Mount Lemmon Survey	615	1.0 km	MPC · JPL
854656	2010 RC_{196}	—	September 14, 2010	Kitt Peak	Spacewatch	·	400 m	MPC · JPL
854657	2010 RD_{196}	—	September 11, 2010	Mount Lemmon	Mount Lemmon Survey	·	450 m	MPC · JPL
854658	2010 RF_{196}	—	September 15, 2010	Mount Lemmon	Mount Lemmon Survey	·	770 m	MPC · JPL
854659	2010 RM_{196}	—	October 4, 2015	Mount Lemmon	Mount Lemmon Survey	·	1.4 km	MPC · JPL
854660	2010 RG_{197}	—	September 2, 2010	Mount Lemmon	Mount Lemmon Survey	·	400 m	MPC · JPL
854661	2010 RY_{197}	—	February 4, 2012	Haleakala	Pan-STARRS 1	·	570 m	MPC · JPL
854662	2010 RV_{198}	—	September 11, 2010	Kitt Peak	Spacewatch	·	430 m	MPC · JPL
854663	2010 RK_{199}	—	December 13, 2015	Haleakala	Pan-STARRS 1	·	930 m	MPC · JPL
854664	2010 RM_{200}	—	May 4, 2014	Haleakala	Pan-STARRS 1	EUN	880 m	MPC · JPL
854665	2010 RC_{201}	—	September 11, 2010	Mount Lemmon	Mount Lemmon Survey	·	900 m	MPC · JPL
854666	2010 RJ_{202}	—	September 26, 2014	Mount Lemmon	Mount Lemmon Survey	·	880 m	MPC · JPL
854667	2010 RP_{202}	—	July 26, 2017	Haleakala	Pan-STARRS 1	·	660 m	MPC · JPL
854668	2010 RV_{203}	—	October 10, 2015	Haleakala	Pan-STARRS 1	·	1.3 km	MPC · JPL
854669	2010 RT_{205}	—	September 3, 2010	Mount Lemmon	Mount Lemmon Survey	MAS	510 m	MPC · JPL
854670	2010 RZ_{205}	—	September 4, 2010	Mount Lemmon	Mount Lemmon Survey	·	1.2 km	MPC · JPL
854671	2010 RL_{206}	—	September 1, 2010	Mount Lemmon	Mount Lemmon Survey	·	530 m	MPC · JPL
854672	2010 RQ_{208}	—	September 5, 2010	Mount Lemmon	Mount Lemmon Survey	EOS	1.1 km	MPC · JPL
854673	2010 RF_{209}	—	September 14, 2010	Mount Lemmon	Mount Lemmon Survey	·	1.8 km	MPC · JPL
854674	2010 RK_{209}	—	September 11, 2010	Mount Lemmon	Mount Lemmon Survey	·	1.5 km	MPC · JPL
854675	2010 RM_{209}	—	September 2, 2010	Mount Lemmon	Mount Lemmon Survey	EOS	1.4 km	MPC · JPL
854676	2010 RZ_{209}	—	September 4, 2010	Kitt Peak	Spacewatch	·	480 m	MPC · JPL
854677	2010 RL_{211}	—	September 3, 2010	Mount Lemmon	Mount Lemmon Survey	·	1.2 km	MPC · JPL
854678	2010 RM_{211}	—	September 4, 2010	Mount Lemmon	Mount Lemmon Survey	·	1.6 km	MPC · JPL
854679	2010 RQ_{211}	—	September 11, 2010	Kitt Peak	Spacewatch	·	690 m	MPC · JPL
854680	2010 RW_{212}	—	September 2, 2010	Mount Lemmon	Mount Lemmon Survey	MAS	470 m	MPC · JPL
854681	2010 RV_{214}	—	September 12, 2010	Kitt Peak	Spacewatch	·	980 m	MPC · JPL
854682	2010 RY_{214}	—	September 1, 2010	Mount Lemmon	Mount Lemmon Survey	PHO	630 m	MPC · JPL
854683	2010 RG_{215}	—	September 2, 2010	Mount Lemmon	Mount Lemmon Survey	EOS	1.2 km	MPC · JPL
854684	2010 RX_{215}	—	September 15, 2010	Kitt Peak	Spacewatch	·	990 m	MPC · JPL
854685	2010 RH_{217}	—	September 10, 2010	Mount Lemmon	Mount Lemmon Survey	·	880 m	MPC · JPL
854686	2010 RN_{217}	—	September 14, 2010	Kitt Peak	Spacewatch	·	830 m	MPC · JPL
854687	2010 RV_{217}	—	December 23, 2016	Haleakala	Pan-STARRS 1	H	340 m	MPC · JPL
854688	2010 RU_{221}	—	September 1, 2010	Mount Lemmon	Mount Lemmon Survey	·	1.9 km	MPC · JPL
854689	2010 RD_{222}	—	September 5, 2010	Kitt Peak	Spacewatch	·	1.8 km	MPC · JPL
854690	2010 RL_{223}	—	August 13, 2010	Kitt Peak	Spacewatch	·	570 m	MPC · JPL
854691	2010 RQ_{223}	—	September 4, 2010	Kitt Peak	Spacewatch	·	1.4 km	MPC · JPL
854692	2010 RG_{224}	—	September 2, 2010	Mount Lemmon	Mount Lemmon Survey	HOF	1.9 km	MPC · JPL
854693	2010 RG_{225}	—	February 22, 2017	Mount Lemmon	Mount Lemmon Survey	·	670 m	MPC · JPL
854694	2010 RY_{227}	—	September 2, 2010	Mount Lemmon	Mount Lemmon Survey	·	950 m	MPC · JPL
854695	2010 RE_{228}	—	September 3, 2010	Mount Lemmon	Mount Lemmon Survey	·	1.4 km	MPC · JPL
854696	2010 RT_{228}	—	September 15, 2010	Mount Lemmon	Mount Lemmon Survey	·	1.4 km	MPC · JPL
854697	2010 RL_{229}	—	September 15, 2010	Mount Lemmon	Mount Lemmon Survey	·	970 m	MPC · JPL
854698	2010 RT_{229}	—	September 3, 2010	Mount Lemmon	Mount Lemmon Survey	·	840 m	MPC · JPL
854699	2010 RW_{229}	—	September 11, 2010	Mount Lemmon	Mount Lemmon Survey	3:2	3.5 km	MPC · JPL
854700	2010 SX_{4}	—	August 13, 2010	Kitt Peak	Spacewatch	·	1.2 km	MPC · JPL

== 854701–854800 ==
back to top

Designation			Discovery			Properties		Ref
Permanent	Provisional	Named after	Date	Site	Discoverer(s)	Category	Diam.	Ref
854701	2010 SK_{9}	—	October 23, 2006	Kitt Peak	Spacewatch	·	1.0 km	MPC · JPL
854702	2010 SU_{14}	—	September 29, 2010	Mount Lemmon	Mount Lemmon Survey	·	2.4 km	MPC · JPL
854703	2010 SC_{16}	—	October 4, 2006	Mount Lemmon	Mount Lemmon Survey	·	840 m	MPC · JPL
854704	2010 SN_{18}	—	October 6, 1996	Kitt Peak	Spacewatch	GAL	1 km	MPC · JPL
854705	2010 SP_{18}	—	September 18, 2010	Kitt Peak	Spacewatch	NYS	930 m	MPC · JPL
854706	2010 SK_{24}	—	September 17, 2010	Mount Lemmon	Mount Lemmon Survey	·	690 m	MPC · JPL
854707	2010 SU_{25}	—	September 17, 2010	Mount Lemmon	Mount Lemmon Survey	NYS	830 m	MPC · JPL
854708	2010 SC_{28}	—	September 17, 2010	Mount Lemmon	Mount Lemmon Survey	·	530 m	MPC · JPL
854709	2010 SQ_{30}	—	August 17, 2006	Palomar	NEAT	·	900 m	MPC · JPL
854710	2010 SE_{31}	—	September 30, 2010	Mount Lemmon	Mount Lemmon Survey	(194)	1.4 km	MPC · JPL
854711	2010 SX_{31}	—	September 30, 2010	Mount Lemmon	Mount Lemmon Survey	·	1.5 km	MPC · JPL
854712	2010 SG_{33}	—	November 10, 2006	Kitt Peak	Spacewatch	·	1.0 km	MPC · JPL
854713	2010 SL_{33}	—	September 30, 2010	Mount Lemmon	Mount Lemmon Survey	·	940 m	MPC · JPL
854714	2010 SN_{36}	—	September 30, 2010	Catalina	CSS	PHO	760 m	MPC · JPL
854715	2010 SZ_{36}	—	November 4, 1999	Kitt Peak	Spacewatch	NYS	880 m	MPC · JPL
854716	2010 SE_{39}	—	December 4, 2007	Kitt Peak	Spacewatch	·	550 m	MPC · JPL
854717	2010 SD_{44}	—	September 17, 2010	Mount Lemmon	Mount Lemmon Survey	MAS	460 m	MPC · JPL
854718	2010 SM_{46}	—	September 17, 2010	Mount Lemmon	Mount Lemmon Survey	·	570 m	MPC · JPL
854719	2010 SE_{47}	—	September 18, 2010	Mount Lemmon	Mount Lemmon Survey	·	2.1 km	MPC · JPL
854720	2010 SQ_{48}	—	September 17, 2010	Kitt Peak	Spacewatch	·	830 m	MPC · JPL
854721	2010 SF_{49}	—	September 17, 2010	Mount Lemmon	Mount Lemmon Survey	·	1.1 km	MPC · JPL
854722	2010 SN_{49}	—	September 18, 2010	Mount Lemmon	Mount Lemmon Survey	H	360 m	MPC · JPL
854723	2010 SZ_{51}	—	September 18, 2010	Mount Lemmon	Mount Lemmon Survey	·	960 m	MPC · JPL
854724	2010 SM_{54}	—	September 29, 2010	Mount Lemmon	Mount Lemmon Survey	·	1.1 km	MPC · JPL
854725	2010 SN_{54}	—	September 17, 2010	Mount Lemmon	Mount Lemmon Survey	·	1.1 km	MPC · JPL
854726	2010 SD_{55}	—	September 18, 2010	Mount Lemmon	Mount Lemmon Survey	·	840 m	MPC · JPL
854727	2010 SB_{56}	—	September 18, 2010	Mount Lemmon	Mount Lemmon Survey	EOS	1.1 km	MPC · JPL
854728	2010 SB_{59}	—	September 30, 2010	Mount Lemmon	Mount Lemmon Survey	·	1.3 km	MPC · JPL
854729	2010 SK_{59}	—	September 29, 2010	Mount Lemmon	Mount Lemmon Survey	V	440 m	MPC · JPL
854730	2010 SC_{62}	—	September 17, 2010	Mount Lemmon	Mount Lemmon Survey	·	2.1 km	MPC · JPL
854731	2010 SN_{62}	—	September 16, 2010	Kitt Peak	Spacewatch	·	840 m	MPC · JPL
854732	2010 SM_{64}	—	September 17, 2010	Kitt Peak	Spacewatch	·	820 m	MPC · JPL
854733	2010 SN_{64}	—	September 29, 2010	Mount Lemmon	Mount Lemmon Survey	·	700 m	MPC · JPL
854734	2010 SX_{64}	—	September 17, 2010	Mount Lemmon	Mount Lemmon Survey	·	1.9 km	MPC · JPL
854735	2010 TD_{4}	—	August 19, 2006	Kitt Peak	Spacewatch	·	720 m	MPC · JPL
854736	2010 TM_{5}	—	October 1, 2010	Mount Lemmon	Mount Lemmon Survey	·	500 m	MPC · JPL
854737	2010 TC_{9}	—	March 21, 2001	Kitt Peak	SKADS	·	750 m	MPC · JPL
854738	2010 TX_{15}	—	September 8, 2010	Kitt Peak	Spacewatch	·	840 m	MPC · JPL
854739	2010 TW_{17}	—	September 3, 2010	Mount Lemmon	Mount Lemmon Survey	·	1.6 km	MPC · JPL
854740	2010 TX_{17}	—	November 26, 2000	Socorro	LINEAR	·	1.2 km	MPC · JPL
854741	2010 TE_{20}	—	September 16, 2010	Kitt Peak	Spacewatch	·	980 m	MPC · JPL
854742	2010 TV_{22}	—	October 1, 2010	Kitt Peak	Spacewatch	MAS	560 m	MPC · JPL
854743	2010 TY_{22}	—	October 1, 2010	Kitt Peak	Spacewatch	NYS	950 m	MPC · JPL
854744	2010 TC_{24}	—	September 17, 2010	Kitt Peak	Spacewatch	·	1.0 km	MPC · JPL
854745	2010 TX_{24}	—	October 1, 2010	Rehoboth	L. A. Molnar, A. Vanden Heuvel	·	850 m	MPC · JPL
854746	2010 TE_{25}	—	October 1, 2010	Catalina	CSS	·	1.4 km	MPC · JPL
854747	2010 TT_{26}	—	September 2, 2010	Mount Lemmon	Mount Lemmon Survey	·	1.5 km	MPC · JPL
854748	2010 TE_{28}	—	September 2, 2010	Mount Lemmon	Mount Lemmon Survey	·	1.5 km	MPC · JPL
854749	2010 TS_{29}	—	November 3, 2007	Kitt Peak	Spacewatch	·	470 m	MPC · JPL
854750	2010 TC_{30}	—	October 2, 2010	Kitt Peak	Spacewatch	·	600 m	MPC · JPL
854751	2010 TF_{30}	—	September 10, 2010	Kitt Peak	Spacewatch	NYS	860 m	MPC · JPL
854752	2010 TD_{31}	—	September 14, 2010	Kitt Peak	Spacewatch	·	800 m	MPC · JPL
854753	2010 TZ_{33}	—	October 25, 1995	Kitt Peak	Spacewatch	·	750 m	MPC · JPL
854754	2010 TF_{34}	—	October 2, 2010	Kitt Peak	Spacewatch	·	1.1 km	MPC · JPL
854755	2010 TT_{34}	—	October 2, 2010	Kitt Peak	Spacewatch	·	2.2 km	MPC · JPL
854756	2010 TA_{35}	—	October 2, 2010	Kitt Peak	Spacewatch	3:2	3.4 km	MPC · JPL
854757	2010 TN_{38}	—	October 6, 2010	Bisei	BATTeRS	·	1.5 km	MPC · JPL
854758	2010 TR_{38}	—	September 10, 2010	Mount Lemmon	Mount Lemmon Survey	·	2.0 km	MPC · JPL
854759	2010 TX_{39}	—	October 2, 2010	Kitt Peak	Spacewatch	·	1.1 km	MPC · JPL
854760	2010 TX_{40}	—	September 16, 2010	Kitt Peak	Spacewatch	·	950 m	MPC · JPL
854761	2010 TY_{45}	—	October 3, 2010	Kitt Peak	Spacewatch	NYS	720 m	MPC · JPL
854762	2010 TY_{47}	—	September 11, 2010	Kitt Peak	Spacewatch	H	400 m	MPC · JPL
854763	2010 TR_{48}	—	September 4, 2010	Kitt Peak	Spacewatch	MAS	530 m	MPC · JPL
854764	2010 TU_{48}	—	September 16, 2010	Kitt Peak	Spacewatch	·	2.2 km	MPC · JPL
854765	2010 TO_{49}	—	August 29, 2006	Kitt Peak	Spacewatch	V	440 m	MPC · JPL
854766	2010 TW_{49}	—	October 2, 2010	Kitt Peak	Spacewatch	NYS	710 m	MPC · JPL
854767	2010 TB_{52}	—	October 8, 2010	Kitt Peak	Spacewatch	·	1.2 km	MPC · JPL
854768	2010 TW_{59}	—	September 17, 2010	Mount Lemmon	Mount Lemmon Survey	·	980 m	MPC · JPL
854769	2010 TL_{61}	—	September 15, 2010	Mount Lemmon	Mount Lemmon Survey	·	1.6 km	MPC · JPL
854770	2010 TD_{63}	—	September 19, 2010	Kitt Peak	Spacewatch	·	430 m	MPC · JPL
854771	2010 TR_{63}	—	October 7, 2010	Kitt Peak	Spacewatch	(1547)	1.1 km	MPC · JPL
854772	2010 TG_{70}	—	September 28, 2010	Kitt Peak	Spacewatch	·	980 m	MPC · JPL
854773	2010 TQ_{70}	—	September 9, 2010	Kitt Peak	Spacewatch	·	1.0 km	MPC · JPL
854774	2010 TV_{73}	—	October 30, 2005	Kitt Peak	Spacewatch	·	1.6 km	MPC · JPL
854775	2010 TC_{74}	—	September 9, 2010	Kitt Peak	Spacewatch	·	510 m	MPC · JPL
854776	2010 TF_{77}	—	October 8, 2010	Westfield	International Astronomical Search Collaboration	·	1.5 km	MPC · JPL
854777	2010 TN_{81}	—	October 27, 2003	Kitt Peak	Spacewatch	MAS	480 m	MPC · JPL
854778	2010 TR_{81}	—	October 8, 2010	Bergisch Gladbach	W. Bickel	·	1.8 km	MPC · JPL
854779	2010 TL_{83}	—	January 1, 2008	Kitt Peak	Spacewatch	·	480 m	MPC · JPL
854780	2010 TU_{87}	—	September 17, 2010	Kitt Peak	Spacewatch	·	760 m	MPC · JPL
854781	2010 TF_{91}	—	September 4, 2010	Kitt Peak	Spacewatch	·	800 m	MPC · JPL
854782	2010 TY_{91}	—	October 29, 2005	Kitt Peak	Spacewatch	·	1.5 km	MPC · JPL
854783	2010 TQ_{95}	—	September 29, 2010	Mount Lemmon	Mount Lemmon Survey	·	370 m	MPC · JPL
854784	2010 TR_{96}	—	September 16, 2010	Kitt Peak	Spacewatch	·	1.3 km	MPC · JPL
854785	2010 TY_{96}	—	October 9, 2010	Mount Lemmon	Mount Lemmon Survey	KOR	990 m	MPC · JPL
854786	2010 TE_{97}	—	October 1, 2010	Mount Lemmon	Mount Lemmon Survey	·	1.6 km	MPC · JPL
854787	2010 TM_{100}	—	September 16, 2010	Kitt Peak	Spacewatch	MAS	520 m	MPC · JPL
854788	2010 TZ_{100}	—	September 16, 2010	Kitt Peak	Spacewatch	DOR	1.5 km	MPC · JPL
854789	2010 TP_{101}	—	October 20, 2003	Kitt Peak	Spacewatch	·	630 m	MPC · JPL
854790	2010 TU_{103}	—	October 24, 2005	Kitt Peak	Spacewatch	·	1.7 km	MPC · JPL
854791	2010 TY_{107}	—	September 4, 2010	Kitt Peak	Spacewatch	AGN	730 m	MPC · JPL
854792	2010 TP_{111}	—	October 9, 2010	Mount Lemmon	Mount Lemmon Survey	·	700 m	MPC · JPL
854793	2010 TP_{113}	—	September 14, 2010	Kitt Peak	Spacewatch	MAS	550 m	MPC · JPL
854794	2010 TV_{114}	—	September 30, 2005	Mount Lemmon	Mount Lemmon Survey	·	1.2 km	MPC · JPL
854795	2010 TL_{115}	—	September 29, 1995	Kitt Peak	Spacewatch	·	630 m	MPC · JPL
854796	2010 TQ_{117}	—	October 9, 2010	Mount Lemmon	Mount Lemmon Survey	TEL	850 m	MPC · JPL
854797	2010 TY_{117}	—	October 9, 2010	Mount Lemmon	Mount Lemmon Survey	·	1.3 km	MPC · JPL
854798	2010 TD_{118}	—	October 9, 2010	Mount Lemmon	Mount Lemmon Survey	EOS	1.3 km	MPC · JPL
854799	2010 TP_{120}	—	October 10, 2010	Kitt Peak	Spacewatch	·	2.1 km	MPC · JPL
854800	2010 TG_{121}	—	September 29, 2010	Mount Lemmon	Mount Lemmon Survey	·	720 m	MPC · JPL

== 854801–854900 ==
back to top

Designation			Discovery			Properties		Ref
Permanent	Provisional	Named after	Date	Site	Discoverer(s)	Category	Diam.	Ref
854801	2010 TS_{121}	—	October 15, 1995	Kitt Peak	Spacewatch	·	760 m	MPC · JPL
854802	2010 TW_{123}	—	October 10, 2010	Kitt Peak	Spacewatch	·	800 m	MPC · JPL
854803	2010 TN_{125}	—	October 10, 2010	Mount Lemmon	Mount Lemmon Survey	·	1.2 km	MPC · JPL
854804	2010 TP_{126}	—	September 25, 2005	Kitt Peak	Spacewatch	·	1.7 km	MPC · JPL
854805	2010 TQ_{126}	—	October 10, 2010	Kitt Peak	Spacewatch	·	1.1 km	MPC · JPL
854806	2010 TB_{128}	—	October 1, 2010	Kitt Peak	Spacewatch	·	1.0 km	MPC · JPL
854807	2010 TN_{132}	—	October 11, 2010	Mount Lemmon	Mount Lemmon Survey	·	1.4 km	MPC · JPL
854808	2010 TT_{132}	—	October 11, 2010	Mount Lemmon	Mount Lemmon Survey	·	1.4 km	MPC · JPL
854809	2010 TV_{140}	—	October 11, 2010	Mount Lemmon	Mount Lemmon Survey	·	900 m	MPC · JPL
854810	2010 TR_{142}	—	September 25, 2006	Kitt Peak	Spacewatch	·	830 m	MPC · JPL
854811	2010 TS_{142}	—	October 11, 2010	Mount Lemmon	Mount Lemmon Survey	·	2.2 km	MPC · JPL
854812	2010 TH_{144}	—	October 11, 2010	Mount Lemmon	Mount Lemmon Survey	EUP	2.6 km	MPC · JPL
854813	2010 TS_{145}	—	October 11, 2010	Mount Lemmon	Mount Lemmon Survey	·	960 m	MPC · JPL
854814	2010 TA_{149}	—	September 10, 2010	Kitt Peak	Spacewatch	EOS	1.3 km	MPC · JPL
854815	2010 TX_{150}	—	September 18, 2010	Mount Lemmon	Mount Lemmon Survey	·	1.4 km	MPC · JPL
854816	2010 TA_{153}	—	October 9, 2010	Mount Lemmon	Mount Lemmon Survey	·	930 m	MPC · JPL
854817	2010 TC_{153}	—	October 9, 2010	Mount Lemmon	Mount Lemmon Survey	·	410 m	MPC · JPL
854818	2010 TK_{156}	—	October 10, 2010	Kitt Peak	Spacewatch	·	490 m	MPC · JPL
854819	2010 TH_{157}	—	October 10, 2010	Kitt Peak	Spacewatch	·	590 m	MPC · JPL
854820	2010 TU_{160}	—	September 11, 2010	Kitt Peak	Spacewatch	NYS	860 m	MPC · JPL
854821	2010 TM_{161}	—	September 9, 2010	Kitt Peak	Spacewatch	NYS	820 m	MPC · JPL
854822	2010 TA_{162}	—	October 11, 2010	Mount Lemmon	Mount Lemmon Survey	·	1.6 km	MPC · JPL
854823	2010 TZ_{164}	—	September 18, 2010	Mount Lemmon	Mount Lemmon Survey	·	1.7 km	MPC · JPL
854824	2010 TX_{165}	—	September 16, 2010	Kitt Peak	Spacewatch	NYS	790 m	MPC · JPL
854825	2010 TN_{171}	—	October 13, 2010	Catalina	CSS	·	690 m	MPC · JPL
854826	2010 TU_{175}	—	October 7, 2010	Catalina	CSS	JUN	800 m	MPC · JPL
854827	2010 TK_{176}	—	September 16, 2010	Kitt Peak	Spacewatch	·	450 m	MPC · JPL
854828	2010 TG_{180}	—	September 11, 2010	Kitt Peak	Spacewatch	·	950 m	MPC · JPL
854829	2010 TS_{180}	—	November 30, 2005	Mount Lemmon	Mount Lemmon Survey	THM	1.9 km	MPC · JPL
854830	2010 TV_{180}	—	September 30, 2006	Mount Lemmon	Mount Lemmon Survey	EUN	770 m	MPC · JPL
854831	2010 TW_{180}	—	September 19, 2010	Kitt Peak	Spacewatch	H	380 m	MPC · JPL
854832	2010 TW_{183}	—	September 14, 2010	Mount Lemmon	Mount Lemmon Survey	THB	2.0 km	MPC · JPL
854833	2010 TE_{185}	—	September 9, 2010	Kitt Peak	Spacewatch	·	2.2 km	MPC · JPL
854834	2010 TG_{187}	—	October 4, 2010	Palomar	Palomar Transient Factory	·	790 m	MPC · JPL
854835	2010 TY_{190}	—	December 18, 1999	Kitt Peak	Spacewatch	·	840 m	MPC · JPL
854836	2010 TA_{197}	—	October 9, 2010	Mount Lemmon	Mount Lemmon Survey	·	730 m	MPC · JPL
854837	2010 TB_{198}	—	October 12, 2010	Mount Lemmon	Mount Lemmon Survey	·	490 m	MPC · JPL
854838	2010 TL_{198}	—	May 9, 2013	Haleakala	Pan-STARRS 1	·	910 m	MPC · JPL
854839	2010 TH_{199}	—	November 30, 2016	Mount Lemmon	Mount Lemmon Survey	·	2.3 km	MPC · JPL
854840	2010 TR_{199}	—	February 16, 2015	Haleakala	Pan-STARRS 1	·	410 m	MPC · JPL
854841	2010 TW_{199}	—	October 12, 2010	Mount Lemmon	Mount Lemmon Survey	·	670 m	MPC · JPL
854842	2010 TE_{200}	—	July 2, 2013	Haleakala	Pan-STARRS 1	·	470 m	MPC · JPL
854843	2010 TK_{200}	—	October 10, 2010	Mount Lemmon	Mount Lemmon Survey	·	900 m	MPC · JPL
854844	2010 TS_{200}	—	July 18, 2013	Haleakala	Pan-STARRS 1	·	500 m	MPC · JPL
854845	2010 TW_{200}	—	September 27, 2010	Kitt Peak	Spacewatch	·	1.9 km	MPC · JPL
854846	2010 TA_{201}	—	October 12, 2010	Mount Lemmon	Mount Lemmon Survey	·	2.0 km	MPC · JPL
854847	2010 TE_{201}	—	October 1, 2010	Kitt Peak	Spacewatch	·	1.5 km	MPC · JPL
854848	2010 TL_{202}	—	October 2, 2010	Kitt Peak	Spacewatch	·	450 m	MPC · JPL
854849	2010 TN_{203}	—	June 15, 2018	Haleakala	Pan-STARRS 1	·	1.2 km	MPC · JPL
854850	2010 TQ_{203}	—	October 14, 2010	Mount Lemmon	Mount Lemmon Survey	·	1.3 km	MPC · JPL
854851	2010 TM_{204}	—	October 1, 2010	Mount Lemmon	Mount Lemmon Survey	GAL	1.1 km	MPC · JPL
854852	2010 TS_{204}	—	October 13, 2010	Mount Lemmon	Mount Lemmon Survey	·	540 m	MPC · JPL
854853	2010 TU_{205}	—	October 12, 2010	Mount Lemmon	Mount Lemmon Survey	·	800 m	MPC · JPL
854854	2010 TG_{206}	—	March 13, 2016	Haleakala	Pan-STARRS 1	·	500 m	MPC · JPL
854855	2010 TQ_{207}	—	October 11, 2010	Mount Lemmon	Mount Lemmon Survey	·	530 m	MPC · JPL
854856	2010 TA_{208}	—	September 6, 2015	Kitt Peak	Spacewatch	·	1.7 km	MPC · JPL
854857	2010 TL_{208}	—	October 12, 2010	Mount Lemmon	Mount Lemmon Survey	·	2.1 km	MPC · JPL
854858	2010 TO_{210}	—	October 10, 2010	Kitt Peak	Spacewatch	ADE	1.5 km	MPC · JPL
854859	2010 TF_{211}	—	October 11, 2010	Mount Lemmon	Mount Lemmon Survey	·	1.9 km	MPC · JPL
854860	2010 TR_{211}	—	October 14, 2010	Mount Lemmon	Mount Lemmon Survey	NYS	830 m	MPC · JPL
854861	2010 TU_{211}	—	October 9, 2010	Mount Lemmon	Mount Lemmon Survey	3:2	3.2 km	MPC · JPL
854862	2010 TD_{212}	—	October 1, 2010	Mount Lemmon	Mount Lemmon Survey	MAS	590 m	MPC · JPL
854863	2010 TE_{212}	—	October 1, 2010	Mount Lemmon	Mount Lemmon Survey	·	460 m	MPC · JPL
854864	2010 TU_{214}	—	October 9, 2010	Mount Lemmon	Mount Lemmon Survey	·	1.7 km	MPC · JPL
854865	2010 TV_{214}	—	October 9, 2010	Mount Lemmon	Mount Lemmon Survey	·	2.3 km	MPC · JPL
854866	2010 TF_{216}	—	October 13, 2010	Kitt Peak	Spacewatch	·	580 m	MPC · JPL
854867	2010 TN_{217}	—	October 9, 2010	Kitt Peak	Spacewatch	·	810 m	MPC · JPL
854868	2010 TA_{218}	—	October 14, 2010	Mount Lemmon	Mount Lemmon Survey	·	1.5 km	MPC · JPL
854869	2010 TK_{218}	—	October 13, 2010	Mount Lemmon	Mount Lemmon Survey	·	1.6 km	MPC · JPL
854870	2010 TK_{219}	—	October 11, 2010	Mount Lemmon	Mount Lemmon Survey	·	1.6 km	MPC · JPL
854871	2010 TL_{219}	—	October 11, 2010	Mount Lemmon	Mount Lemmon Survey	EOS	1.4 km	MPC · JPL
854872	2010 TM_{219}	—	October 12, 2010	Mount Lemmon	Mount Lemmon Survey	EOS	1.3 km	MPC · JPL
854873	2010 TP_{219}	—	October 13, 2010	Mount Lemmon	Mount Lemmon Survey	·	460 m	MPC · JPL
854874	2010 TM_{220}	—	October 13, 2010	Mount Lemmon	Mount Lemmon Survey	·	490 m	MPC · JPL
854875	2010 TS_{220}	—	October 11, 2010	Mount Lemmon	Mount Lemmon Survey	·	1.4 km	MPC · JPL
854876	2010 TX_{220}	—	February 11, 2018	Haleakala	Pan-STARRS 1	·	2.1 km	MPC · JPL
854877	2010 TA_{222}	—	October 12, 2010	Mount Lemmon	Mount Lemmon Survey	·	870 m	MPC · JPL
854878	2010 TU_{222}	—	October 2, 2010	Kitt Peak	Spacewatch	·	730 m	MPC · JPL
854879	2010 TP_{223}	—	October 11, 2010	Kitt Peak	Spacewatch	·	920 m	MPC · JPL
854880	2010 TQ_{223}	—	October 12, 2010	Kitt Peak	Spacewatch	NYS	740 m	MPC · JPL
854881	2010 TN_{227}	—	October 13, 2010	Kitt Peak	Spacewatch	·	780 m	MPC · JPL
854882	2010 TF_{230}	—	October 1, 2010	Catalina	CSS	·	460 m	MPC · JPL
854883	2010 TM_{230}	—	October 1, 2010	Mount Lemmon	Mount Lemmon Survey	·	1.9 km	MPC · JPL
854884	2010 TX_{230}	—	October 14, 2010	Mount Lemmon	Mount Lemmon Survey	·	1.2 km	MPC · JPL
854885	2010 TQ_{234}	—	October 8, 2010	Kitt Peak	Spacewatch	·	790 m	MPC · JPL
854886	2010 TH_{239}	—	October 12, 2010	Mount Lemmon	Mount Lemmon Survey	·	1.3 km	MPC · JPL
854887	2010 TK_{242}	—	October 12, 2010	Kitt Peak	Spacewatch	·	390 m	MPC · JPL
854888	2010 TK_{243}	—	October 9, 2010	Mount Lemmon	Mount Lemmon Survey	·	890 m	MPC · JPL
854889	2010 TQ_{243}	—	November 5, 2005	Kitt Peak	Spacewatch	·	1.6 km	MPC · JPL
854890	2010 UJ_{2}	—	October 17, 2010	Mount Lemmon	Mount Lemmon Survey	·	1.9 km	MPC · JPL
854891	2010 UM_{2}	—	October 17, 2010	Mount Lemmon	Mount Lemmon Survey	(1547)	1.1 km	MPC · JPL
854892	2010 UH_{3}	—	October 17, 2010	Mount Lemmon	Mount Lemmon Survey	·	1.6 km	MPC · JPL
854893	2010 UE_{5}	—	October 17, 2010	Mount Lemmon	Mount Lemmon Survey	(5)	880 m	MPC · JPL
854894	2010 UO_{10}	—	September 11, 2004	Kitt Peak	Spacewatch	·	1.9 km	MPC · JPL
854895	2010 UG_{11}	—	October 8, 2010	Catalina	CSS	·	1.6 km	MPC · JPL
854896	2010 UW_{13}	—	November 7, 1996	Kitt Peak	Spacewatch	·	1.4 km	MPC · JPL
854897	2010 UE_{17}	—	October 28, 2005	Kitt Peak	Spacewatch	·	1.2 km	MPC · JPL
854898	2010 UZ_{18}	—	October 28, 2010	Mount Lemmon	Mount Lemmon Survey	·	1.3 km	MPC · JPL
854899	2010 UB_{23}	—	October 17, 2010	Mount Lemmon	Mount Lemmon Survey	·	1.3 km	MPC · JPL
854900	2010 UX_{23}	—	October 28, 2010	Mount Lemmon	Mount Lemmon Survey	·	2.7 km	MPC · JPL

== 854901–855000 ==
back to top

Designation			Discovery			Properties		Ref
Permanent	Provisional	Named after	Date	Site	Discoverer(s)	Category	Diam.	Ref
854901	2010 UG_{24}	—	October 28, 2010	Mount Lemmon	Mount Lemmon Survey	MAS	520 m	MPC · JPL
854902	2010 UW_{26}	—	October 19, 2010	Mount Lemmon	Mount Lemmon Survey	·	1.3 km	MPC · JPL
854903	2010 UB_{28}	—	September 28, 2006	Kitt Peak	Spacewatch	NYS	780 m	MPC · JPL
854904	2010 UE_{34}	—	October 25, 2003	Kitt Peak	Spacewatch	·	580 m	MPC · JPL
854905	2010 UQ_{37}	—	October 29, 2010	Piszkés-tető	K. Sárneczky, S. Kürti	PHO	750 m	MPC · JPL
854906	2010 US_{40}	—	October 29, 2010	Piszkés-tető	K. Sárneczky, S. Kürti	·	1.3 km	MPC · JPL
854907	2010 UB_{47}	—	October 30, 2010	Piszkés-tető	K. Sárneczky, Z. Kuli	·	1.2 km	MPC · JPL
854908	2010 UM_{47}	—	October 30, 2010	Piszkés-tető	K. Sárneczky, Z. Kuli	EOS	1.2 km	MPC · JPL
854909	2010 UG_{51}	—	August 16, 2006	Siding Spring	SSS	PHO	770 m	MPC · JPL
854910	2010 UB_{53}	—	October 29, 2010	Kitt Peak	Spacewatch	·	630 m	MPC · JPL
854911	2010 UA_{59}	—	October 29, 2010	Kitt Peak	Spacewatch	·	2.6 km	MPC · JPL
854912	2010 UL_{64}	—	September 3, 2010	Kitt Peak	Spacewatch	·	1.1 km	MPC · JPL
854913	2010 UA_{66}	—	November 5, 1999	Kitt Peak	Spacewatch	MAS	450 m	MPC · JPL
854914	2010 UD_{67}	—	October 31, 2010	Mount Lemmon	Mount Lemmon Survey	·	1.0 km	MPC · JPL
854915	2010 UP_{68}	—	October 31, 2010	Piszkés-tető	K. Sárneczky, Z. Kuli	·	820 m	MPC · JPL
854916	2010 UG_{71}	—	September 25, 1995	Kitt Peak	Spacewatch	·	620 m	MPC · JPL
854917	2010 UG_{84}	—	October 30, 2010	Mount Lemmon	Mount Lemmon Survey	·	460 m	MPC · JPL
854918	2010 UO_{87}	—	October 25, 2005	Kitt Peak	Spacewatch	·	1.2 km	MPC · JPL
854919	2010 UQ_{88}	—	October 19, 2010	Mount Lemmon	Mount Lemmon Survey	·	850 m	MPC · JPL
854920	2010 UT_{88}	—	September 30, 2010	Mount Lemmon	Mount Lemmon Survey	·	820 m	MPC · JPL
854921	2010 UX_{91}	—	October 31, 2010	Kitt Peak	Spacewatch	(883)	420 m	MPC · JPL
854922	2010 UJ_{93}	—	October 30, 2010	Kitt Peak	Spacewatch	·	590 m	MPC · JPL
854923	2010 UL_{93}	—	October 13, 2010	Mount Lemmon	Mount Lemmon Survey	·	860 m	MPC · JPL
854924	2010 UT_{98}	—	October 13, 2010	Mount Lemmon	Mount Lemmon Survey	·	2.4 km	MPC · JPL
854925	2010 UZ_{107}	—	December 8, 2010	Mount Lemmon	Mount Lemmon Survey	JUN	800 m	MPC · JPL
854926	2010 UK_{112}	—	August 10, 2010	Kitt Peak	Spacewatch	JUN	860 m	MPC · JPL
854927	2010 US_{112}	—	October 30, 2010	Mount Lemmon	Mount Lemmon Survey	V	480 m	MPC · JPL
854928	2010 UK_{113}	—	May 7, 2014	Haleakala	Pan-STARRS 1	·	1.3 km	MPC · JPL
854929	2010 UN_{115}	—	March 17, 2012	Mount Lemmon	Mount Lemmon Survey	PHO	790 m	MPC · JPL
854930	2010 UU_{115}	—	March 27, 2017	Haleakala	Pan-STARRS 1	·	1.4 km	MPC · JPL
854931	2010 UF_{117}	—	October 29, 2010	Mount Lemmon	Mount Lemmon Survey	·	1.8 km	MPC · JPL
854932	2010 UG_{118}	—	January 22, 2015	Haleakala	Pan-STARRS 1	·	450 m	MPC · JPL
854933	2010 UM_{118}	—	October 31, 2010	Mount Lemmon	Mount Lemmon Survey	·	1.7 km	MPC · JPL
854934	2010 UN_{118}	—	November 3, 2010	Mount Lemmon	Mount Lemmon Survey	·	960 m	MPC · JPL
854935	2010 UA_{120}	—	October 30, 2010	Mount Lemmon	Mount Lemmon Survey	EOS	1.6 km	MPC · JPL
854936	2010 UJ_{120}	—	October 29, 2010	Mount Lemmon	Mount Lemmon Survey	·	470 m	MPC · JPL
854937	2010 UV_{120}	—	October 30, 2010	Piszkés-tető	K. Sárneczky, Z. Kuli	·	1.1 km	MPC · JPL
854938	2010 UJ_{121}	—	October 28, 2010	Mount Lemmon	Mount Lemmon Survey	·	960 m	MPC · JPL
854939	2010 UY_{121}	—	October 29, 2010	Mount Lemmon	Mount Lemmon Survey	V	380 m	MPC · JPL
854940	2010 UA_{122}	—	October 31, 2010	Mount Lemmon	Mount Lemmon Survey	(5)	730 m	MPC · JPL
854941	2010 UM_{123}	—	October 31, 2010	Kitt Peak	Spacewatch	·	1.9 km	MPC · JPL
854942	2010 UP_{123}	—	October 17, 2010	Mount Lemmon	Mount Lemmon Survey	·	1.6 km	MPC · JPL
854943	2010 UM_{124}	—	October 17, 2010	Mount Lemmon	Mount Lemmon Survey	NAE	1.6 km	MPC · JPL
854944	2010 UF_{127}	—	October 17, 2010	Mount Lemmon	Mount Lemmon Survey	·	540 m	MPC · JPL
854945	2010 UN_{127}	—	October 31, 2010	Mount Lemmon	Mount Lemmon Survey	3:2	3.9 km	MPC · JPL
854946	2010 UL_{128}	—	October 29, 2010	Kitt Peak	Spacewatch	·	760 m	MPC · JPL
854947	2010 UV_{128}	—	October 17, 2010	Mount Lemmon	Mount Lemmon Survey	·	740 m	MPC · JPL
854948	2010 UX_{128}	—	August 27, 2006	Kitt Peak	Spacewatch	NYS	820 m	MPC · JPL
854949	2010 UD_{130}	—	October 17, 2010	Mount Lemmon	Mount Lemmon Survey	PHO	600 m	MPC · JPL
854950	2010 UC_{131}	—	October 31, 2010	Mount Lemmon	Mount Lemmon Survey	EUP	2.3 km	MPC · JPL
854951	2010 UJ_{131}	—	October 17, 2010	Mount Lemmon	Mount Lemmon Survey	·	1.9 km	MPC · JPL
854952	2010 UF_{132}	—	October 28, 2010	Mount Lemmon	Mount Lemmon Survey	·	880 m	MPC · JPL
854953	2010 UK_{134}	—	October 31, 2010	Mount Lemmon	Mount Lemmon Survey	·	1.0 km	MPC · JPL
854954	2010 UD_{135}	—	October 17, 2010	Mount Lemmon	Mount Lemmon Survey	·	500 m	MPC · JPL
854955	2010 UG_{136}	—	October 17, 2010	Mount Lemmon	Mount Lemmon Survey	·	710 m	MPC · JPL
854956	2010 UP_{136}	—	October 17, 2010	Mount Lemmon	Mount Lemmon Survey	·	1.4 km	MPC · JPL
854957	2010 UX_{136}	—	October 29, 2010	Mount Lemmon	Mount Lemmon Survey	HOF	1.8 km	MPC · JPL
854958	2010 UO_{137}	—	October 17, 2010	Mount Lemmon	Mount Lemmon Survey	·	460 m	MPC · JPL
854959	2010 UQ_{137}	—	October 30, 2010	Mount Lemmon	Mount Lemmon Survey	·	490 m	MPC · JPL
854960	2010 US_{137}	—	October 17, 2010	Mount Lemmon	Mount Lemmon Survey	3:2 · SHU	3.1 km	MPC · JPL
854961	2010 VQ_{4}	—	November 1, 2010	Mount Lemmon	Mount Lemmon Survey	·	1.3 km	MPC · JPL
854962	2010 VU_{18}	—	September 30, 2010	Mount Lemmon	Mount Lemmon Survey	·	1.1 km	MPC · JPL
854963	2010 VG_{19}	—	November 2, 2010	Kitt Peak	Spacewatch	KOR	1.0 km	MPC · JPL
854964	2010 VC_{20}	—	November 2, 2010	Mount Lemmon	Mount Lemmon Survey	·	940 m	MPC · JPL
854965	2010 VV_{28}	—	October 13, 2010	Catalina	CSS	·	1.2 km	MPC · JPL
854966	2010 VA_{29}	—	November 2, 2010	Mount Lemmon	Mount Lemmon Survey	·	920 m	MPC · JPL
854967	2010 VV_{30}	—	October 17, 2010	Catalina	CSS	·	1.2 km	MPC · JPL
854968	2010 VZ_{32}	—	November 3, 2010	Mount Lemmon	Mount Lemmon Survey	·	460 m	MPC · JPL
854969	2010 VC_{33}	—	October 2, 2006	Mount Lemmon	Mount Lemmon Survey	·	1.1 km	MPC · JPL
854970	2010 VG_{43}	—	October 11, 2010	Mount Lemmon	Mount Lemmon Survey	·	510 m	MPC · JPL
854971	2010 VV_{45}	—	November 2, 2010	Kitt Peak	Spacewatch	·	600 m	MPC · JPL
854972	2010 VN_{46}	—	November 2, 2010	Kitt Peak	Spacewatch	H	410 m	MPC · JPL
854973	2010 VR_{53}	—	September 18, 2006	Kitt Peak	Spacewatch	MAS	480 m	MPC · JPL
854974	2010 VU_{54}	—	November 3, 2010	Mount Lemmon	Mount Lemmon Survey	(18466)	1.5 km	MPC · JPL
854975	2010 VJ_{55}	—	September 11, 2010	Mount Lemmon	Mount Lemmon Survey	·	890 m	MPC · JPL
854976	2010 VP_{56}	—	October 17, 2010	Mount Lemmon	Mount Lemmon Survey	·	1.2 km	MPC · JPL
854977	2010 VB_{68}	—	September 17, 2010	Mount Lemmon	Mount Lemmon Survey	MAS	480 m	MPC · JPL
854978	2010 VF_{68}	—	November 3, 2010	La Sagra	OAM	H	410 m	MPC · JPL
854979	2010 VK_{69}	—	July 10, 2005	Siding Spring	SSS	·	1.9 km	MPC · JPL
854980	2010 VN_{71}	—	October 10, 2010	Kitt Peak	Spacewatch	NYS	880 m	MPC · JPL
854981	2010 VY_{77}	—	November 3, 2010	Mount Lemmon	Mount Lemmon Survey	DOR	1.6 km	MPC · JPL
854982	2010 VD_{78}	—	November 3, 2010	Mount Lemmon	Mount Lemmon Survey	·	1.3 km	MPC · JPL
854983	2010 VG_{78}	—	September 18, 2010	Mount Lemmon	Mount Lemmon Survey	NYS	840 m	MPC · JPL
854984	2010 VV_{80}	—	November 3, 2010	Mount Lemmon	Mount Lemmon Survey	·	2.3 km	MPC · JPL
854985	2010 VY_{80}	—	November 3, 2010	Mount Lemmon	Mount Lemmon Survey	EOS	1.3 km	MPC · JPL
854986	2010 VL_{84}	—	October 28, 2010	Kitt Peak	Spacewatch	·	1.0 km	MPC · JPL
854987	2010 VP_{84}	—	November 22, 2006	Mount Lemmon	Mount Lemmon Survey	·	930 m	MPC · JPL
854988	2010 VF_{92}	—	October 17, 2010	Mount Lemmon	Mount Lemmon Survey	·	1.4 km	MPC · JPL
854989	2010 VH_{93}	—	September 3, 2010	Mount Lemmon	Mount Lemmon Survey	·	1.7 km	MPC · JPL
854990	2010 VF_{97}	—	September 16, 2010	Mount Lemmon	Mount Lemmon Survey	·	500 m	MPC · JPL
854991	2010 VG_{101}	—	November 5, 2010	Kitt Peak	Spacewatch	·	1.3 km	MPC · JPL
854992	2010 VJ_{101}	—	September 17, 2006	Kitt Peak	Spacewatch	NYS	940 m	MPC · JPL
854993	2010 VN_{101}	—	November 5, 2010	Kitt Peak	Spacewatch	·	2.0 km	MPC · JPL
854994	2010 VG_{104}	—	November 5, 2010	Kitt Peak	Spacewatch	·	680 m	MPC · JPL
854995	2010 VP_{112}	—	November 7, 2010	Kitt Peak	Spacewatch	·	880 m	MPC · JPL
854996	2010 VA_{128}	—	November 8, 2010	Mount Lemmon	Mount Lemmon Survey	EOS	1.3 km	MPC · JPL
854997	2010 VB_{129}	—	November 9, 2010	Catalina	CSS	·	890 m	MPC · JPL
854998	2010 VE_{129}	—	September 17, 2010	Mount Lemmon	Mount Lemmon Survey	·	950 m	MPC · JPL
854999	2010 VJ_{130}	—	November 1, 2010	Mount Lemmon	Mount Lemmon Survey	·	890 m	MPC · JPL
855000	2010 VP_{135}	—	September 30, 1997	Kitt Peak	Spacewatch	·	950 m	MPC · JPL

back to top
