= Meanings of minor-planet names: 231001–232000 =

As minor planet discoveries are confirmed, they are given a permanent number by the IAU's Minor Planet Center (MPC), and the discoverers can then submit names for them, following the IAU's naming conventions. The list below concerns those minor planets in the specified number-range that have received names, and explains the meanings of those names.

Official naming citations of newly named small Solar System bodies are approved and published in a bulletin by IAU's Working Group for Small Bodies Nomenclature (WGSBN). Before May 2021, citations were published in MPC's Minor Planet Circulars for many decades. Recent citations can also be found on the JPL Small-Body Database (SBDB). Until his death in 2016, German astronomer Lutz D. Schmadel compiled these citations into the Dictionary of Minor Planet Names (DMP) and regularly updated the collection.

Based on Paul Herget's The Names of the Minor Planets, Schmadel also researched the unclear origin of numerous asteroids, most of which had been named prior to World War II. This article incorporates text from this source, which is in the public domain: SBDB New namings may only be added to this list below after official publication as the preannouncement of names is condemned. The WGSBN publishes a comprehensive guideline for the naming rules of non-cometary small Solar System bodies.

== 231001–231100 ==
Named minor planet	Provisional	This minor planet was named for...	Ref · Catalog
231040 Kakaras	2005 EX_{282}	Gunaras Kakaras (born 1939) is a Lithuanian astronomer and one of the most skilled Lithuanian popularizers of astronomy. He is an expert on stellar photometry of binary stars and he wrote several popular books and many popular papers. He established the Lithuanian Museum of Ethnocosmology in 1990.	JPL · 231040
231042 Johnhayes	2005 EF_{296}	John R. Hayes (born 1960), American software engineer specialising in embedded systems.	JPL · 231042

== 231101–231200 ==
back to top

Named minor planet	Provisional	This minor planet was named for...	Ref · Catalog
There are no named minor planets in this number range

== 231201–231300 ==
back to top

Named minor planet	Provisional	This minor planet was named for...	Ref · Catalog
231265 Saulperlmutter	2006 AS_{4}	Saul Perlmutter (born 1959), an American physicist and Nobel laureate	JPL · 231265
231278 Kárpáti	2006 BY_{26}	Rudolf Kárpáti (1920–1999), a Hungarian fencer who won six gold medals in sabre at four Olympic Games between 1948 and 1960	JPL · 231278

== 231301–231400 ==
back to top

Named minor planet	Provisional	This minor planet was named for...	Ref · Catalog
231307 Peterfalk	2006 BD_{186}	Peter Falk (1927–2011), an American actor	JPL · 231307
231346 Taofanlin	2006 EL_{67}	Tao Fan-Lin, director of the Taipei amateur astronomers association	JPL · 231346
231368 Hunfalvy	2006 HF_{18}	János Hunfalvy (1820–1888), a geographer, university professor, full member of the Hungarian Academy of Sciences and founder of Hungarian scientific geography.	IAU · 231368
231379 Jonhandiboe	2006 HV_{133}	Jon D. Handiboe (born 1970), American IT facilities and security specialist.	IAU · 231379

== 231401–231500 ==
back to top

Named minor planet	Provisional	This minor planet was named for...	Ref · Catalog
231446 Dayao	2007 GE_{75}	Dayao County is located in the north-central Yunnan Province of China. It has a long history, rich mineral resources and good astronomical observing conditions. Dayao was ranked one of the most beautiful counties of China in 2020.	IAU · 231446
231470 Bedding	2007 RH_{5}	Tim Bedding (born 1966), a full professor at the University of Sydney.	JPL · 231470
231486 Capefearrock	2008 PQ_{2}	The Cape Fear High School in Fayetteville, North Carolina, United States. Since 1996, dozens of its students have submitted thousands of near-Earth objects observations to the MPC.	JPL · 231486

== 231501–231600 ==
back to top

Named minor planet	Provisional	This minor planet was named for...	Ref · Catalog
231555 Christianeurda	2008 TT_{2}	Christiane-Urda Süßenberger (born 1967), wife of German discoverer Uwe Süßenberger	JPL · 231555
231571 Tubolyvince	2008 UP_{3}	Vince Tuboly (1956–2024), a Hungarian amateur astronomer.	IAU · 231571

== 231601–231700 ==
back to top

Named minor planet	Provisional	This minor planet was named for...	Ref · Catalog
231609 Sarcander	2009 RV	Michael Sarcander (born 1955), German astronomer and long-time technical manager of the planetarium in Mannheim, has produced many educational shows for the general public. He has published several hundred observing tips for asteroids reaching a favorable apparition or closely approaching other celestial objects.	IAU · 231609
231649 Korotkiy	2009 WW	Stanislav Alexandrovich Korotkiy (born 1983), a Russian amateur astronomer and discoverer of minor planets	JPL · 231649
231666 Aisymnos	1960 SX	Aesymnus (Aisymnos), ruler of the Achaeans (Danaans) and Greek warrior from Greek mythology. He was killed by Hektor during the Trojan War.	JPL · 231666
231675 Amandastadermann	1994 RV_{5}	Amanda C. Stadermann (b. 1994), an American planetary geoscientist.	IAU · 231675

== 231701–231800 ==
back to top

Named minor planet	Provisional	This minor planet was named for...	Ref · Catalog
There are no named minor planets in this number range

== 231801–231900 ==
back to top

Named minor planet	Provisional	This minor planet was named for...	Ref · Catalog
231832 Briankeeney	2000 OG_{69}	Brian A. Keeney (born 1979), American astronomer who helped with several aspects of the New Horizons mission.	IAU · 231832
231841 Danielkatz	2000 QT_{232}	Daniel J. Katz (born 1959), American developer of engineering and scientific software for modelling, simulation and engineering analysis.	IAU · 231841
231842 Graemekeleher	2000 QW_{242}	Graeme P. Keleher (born 1992), American mission operations real-time flight controller.	IAU · 231842

== 231901–232000 ==
back to top

Named minor planet	Provisional	This minor planet was named for...	Ref · Catalog
231969 Sebvauclair	2001 QD_{94}	Sebastien Vauclair (born 1976) is a French astronomer working on high-energy astronomy. He is also a leader in dark-sky protection, especially for the dark-sky reserve known as the Reserve Internationale de Ciel Etoile du Pic du Midi, located in the Pyrenees.	JPL · 231969

back to top

Preceded by 230,001–231,000	Meanings of minor-planet names List of minor planets: 231,001–232,000	Succeeded by 232,001–233,000
