= Gunaras Kakaras =

- Born: 8 January 1939 (age 87); Padaičiai, near Biržai, Lithuania
- Education: Vilnius University
- Known for: Stars Photometry
- Scientific career
- Fields: Astronomy and Astrophysics
- Workplaces: Lithuanian Museum of Ethnocosmology

Gunaras Imantas Kakaras (born 8 January 1939, Padaičiai near Biržai) is a Lithuanian astronomer, founder and director of Lithuanian Museum of Ethnocosmology. He is widely known in Lithuania and Post-Soviet states as a scientist, advocating and popularising Lithuanian ethnic culture along with astronomy.

In 1967, he published his first book Šimtas astronomijos mįslių (A Hundred Mysteries of Astronomy). In 1977, together with Algimantas Ažusienis and Antanas Juška, Kakaras released a textbook Astrofizika. His field of interests has evolved into unique concept of ethnocosmology. This new idea was widely supported in Lithuania, and resulted in establishing Lithuanian Museum of Ethnocosmology in 1990, which was built near Molėtai Astronomical Observatory, and until now is led by Kakaras himself. Asteroid 231040 Kakaras was named in his honor. The official naming citation was published by the Minor Planet Center on 25 September 2018 (M.P.C. 111803).

== Publications ==
1. G. Kakaras, "Šimtas astronomijos mįslių", Vaga, Vilnius, Lithuania, 1967
2. G. Kakaras, A. Ažusienis and A. Juška, "Astrofizika", Textbook, Vilnius, Lithuania, 1977
