= Krisztián Sárneczky =

Hungarian astronomer (born 1974)

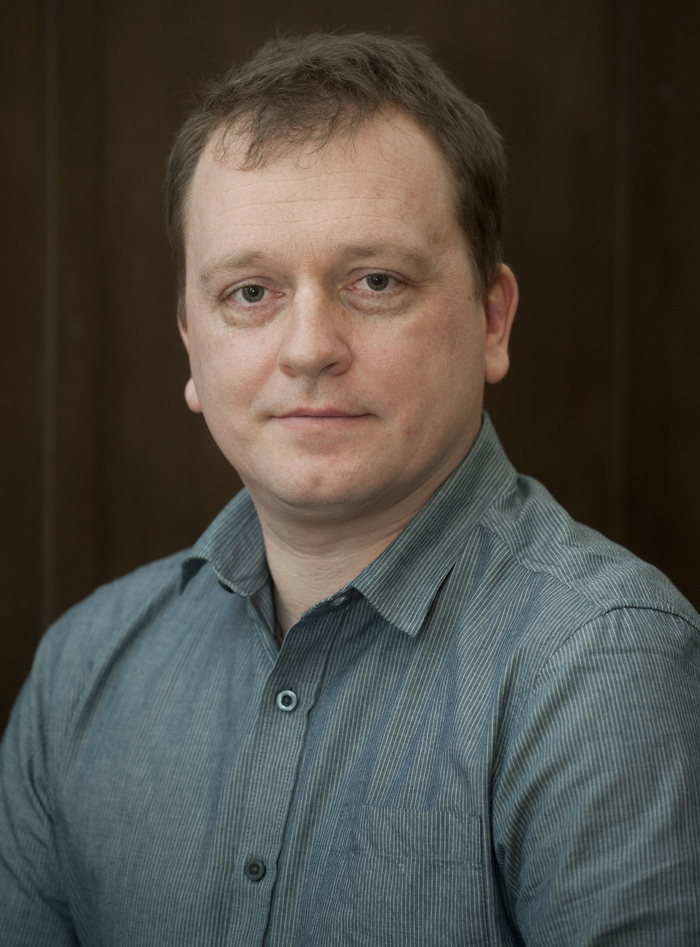
- Sarneczky in 2015
- Born: 6 November 1974 (age 51); Budapest, Hungary
- Education: University of Szeged
- Children: 1
- Website: Konkoly Observatory

Krisztián Sárneczky (born 6 November 1974) is a Hungarian teacher of geography and prolific discoverer of minor planets and supernovae, researching at Konkoly Observatory in Budapest, Hungary. He is a board member of the Hungarian Astronomical Association (HAA) and member of the American Association of Variable Star Observers, leader of the Comet Section of the HAA, and is a contributor in the editorial work of Hungarian Astronomical Almanach.

== Personal life ==
In 1990, he joined the Hungarian Astronomical Association and became the Co-ordinator of the Cometary Section the same year. In 1994, he became a member of the Executive Committee and in 1996 he was appointed secretary. In 1996 he also joined the American Association of Variable Star Observers (AAVSO).

Krisztián Sárneczky has published a number of articles in the astronomy community, and has a large number of asteroid discoveries to his credit (see § Discoveries).

== Professional experience ==
Minor planets discovered: 416
see § List of discovered minor planets

- Astrometry of comets and minor planets (including rotational light curves)
- Photometry of supernovae.

== Places of field work ==
- Siding Spring Observatory, NSW, Australia (visiting astronomer, 2007),
- Hungarian Astronomical Association's Polaris Observatory, Budapest, (from 2006 - )
- Baja Astronomical Observatory (visiting astronomer, 2005)
- The German-Spanish Astronomical Center at Calar Alto Observatory (visiting astronomer, 2000 and 2001)
- Observatory of Hungarian Scientific Academy Konkoly-Thege Miklós Astronomical Research Institute at Piszkéstetõ, Hungary (visiting astronomer from 1997)
- Observatory of Szeged (from 1996)

== Conferences ==
- GAIA-FUN-SSO-2 Workshop, September 19–21, 2012, Paris,
- Supernovae Illuminating the Universe: from Individuals to Populations, September 10–14, 2012, Garching bei München, MPA/ESO/MPE/Excellence Cluster Universe Conference on Supernovae Illuminating the Universe: from Individuals to Populations
- IAU Colloquium 192, "Supernovae - 10 years of SN 1993J", April 22–26, 2003, Valencia,
- National Young Scientists' Conference (OTDK), second place in Physics Section, Astronomy subsection (1999),
- IAU Colloquium 173,"Evolution and Source Regions of Asteroids and Comets", August 24–28, 1998, Tatranska Lomnica,

== Awards and honors ==
- Eötvös Fellowship (2007)
- National Young Scientists' Conference (OTDK), first place in Physics-Earth Sciences-Mathematics Section, Astronomy I. (Solar System) subsection (2001)
- Pro Renovanda Cultura Hungariae DT 2000/43.
- National Young Scientists' Conference (OTDK), second place in Physics Section, Astronomy subsection (1999)
- Young Scientists' Conference at University of Szeged (TDK), first place in Physics Section (1998 and 2000)
- In 2017, asteroid 10258 Sárneczky was named after him

== Books ==
- Sváb-hegyi kisbolygók, (Márta Sragner Keszthelyiné) Az égbolt mindenkié. Budapest: Introducing the Hungarian Astronomical Association, 2005, ISBN 963-218-243-X

== Publications ==
- Sárneczky K., Szabó Gy., Kiss L.L.: 1999, CCD observations of 11 faint asteroids, Astronomy and Astrophysics Supplement Series, 137., 363,
- List of publications by Krisztián Sárneczky from 1999 to 2007
- List of publications by Krisztián Sárneczky from 2005 to 2013, Csillagászati hírportál,

== Interview ==
- The first astronomical program on the internet. 2009
- Asteroid hunter from Piszkéstető, 2010

== Discoveries ==
As of 2018, Krisztián Sárneczky is credited by the Minor Planet Center with the discovery and co-discovery of 379 numbered minor planets during 2000–2012, as well as the co-discovery of 5 supernovae including 2011ba and 2011ab Anonym. He has also discovered three of the first eight predicted earth impactors: 2022 EB5, 2023 CX1, and 2024 BX1. Each of these impacted Earth's atmosphere generating a fireball within hours of discovery.

=== List of discovered minor planets ===
Co-discoverers: ^{A} L. Kiss · ^{B} G. Szabó · ^{C} Z. Heiner · ^{D} A. Derekas · ^{E} S. Mészáros · ^{F} B. Sipőcz, B. S. ocz · ^{G} G. Fűrész · ^{H} D. Szám · ^{I} T. Szalai · ^{J} Z. Kuli · ^{K} B. Csák · ^{L} Á. Kárpáti · ^{M} C. Orgel · ^{N} A. Szing · ^{O} S. Kürti · ^{P} J. Kelemen · ^{Q} E. Bányai · ^{R} A. Farkas · ^{S} G. Mező · ^{T} A. Pál · ^{U} A. Király · ^{V} M. Langbroek · ^{W} G. Hodosán · ^{X} T. Csörgei · ^{Y} P. Székely · ^{Z} Á. Sódor · ^{AA} J. Szulágyi · ^{AB} K. Vida · ^{AC} T. Vorobjov · ^{AD} D. Tarczay-Nehéz · ^{AE} B. Cseh · ^{AF} L. Kriskovics · ^{AG} G. Marton · ^{AH} K. Takáts

14181 Koromházi	20 November 1998	list^{[A]}
23718 Horgos	2 April 1998	list^{[A]}
28196 Szeged	15 December 1998	list^{[A]}
31872 Terkán	13 March 2000	list^{[B]}
37432 Piszkéstető	11 January 2002	list^{[C]}
38442 Szilárd	24 September 1999	list^{[B]}
39971 József	2 April 1998	list^{[A]}
44479 Oláheszter	24 November 1998	list^{[A]}
45300 Thewrewk	1 January 2000	list^{[A]}
53029 Wodetzky	22 November 1998	list^{[A]}
64974 Savaria	11 January 2002	list^{[C]}
67308 Öveges	21 April 2000	list^{[A]}
68114 Deákferenc	1 January 2001	list^{[A]}
68144 Mizser	1 January 2001	list^{[A]}
72071 Gábor	31 December 2000	list^{[A]}
73511 Lovas	25 December 2002	list
75555 Wonaszek	31 December 1999	list^{[A]}
75570 Jenőwigner	1 January 2000	list^{[A]}
75823 Csokonai	28 January 2000	list^{[A]}
82071 Debrecen	31 December 2000	list^{[A]}
82092 Kalocsa	27 February 2001	list^{[D]}
82656 Puskás	10 August 2001	list^{[B]}
84919 Karinthy	3 November 2003	list^{[E]}
84921 Morkoláb	9 November 2003	list^{[F]}
84995 Zselic	26 December 2003	list

84996 Hortobágy	26 December 2003	list
86196 Specula	24 September 1999	list^{[A]}
89973 Aranyjános	8 September 2002	list
90370 Jókaimór	7 July 2003	list^{[F]}
90376 Kossuth	5 November 2003	list^{[E]}
91024 Széchenyi	28 February 1998	list^{[A]}
95179 Berkó	16 January 2002	list^{[C]}
95785 Csányivilmos	27 March 2003	list
95954 Bayzoltán	23 August 2003	list^{[F]}
106869 Irinyi	31 December 2000	list^{[A]}
107052 Aquincum	1 January 2001	list^{[A]}
111468 Alba Regia	23 December 2001	list^{[G]}
111570 Ágasvár	11 January 2002	list^{[C]}
111594 Ráktanya	11 January 2002	list^{[C]}
113202 Kisslászló	7 September 2002	list
113203 Szabó	7 September 2002	list
113214 Vinkó	9 September 2002	list
114659 Sajnovics	28 March 2003	list
114987 Tittel	26 August 2003	list^{[F]}
114990 Szeidl	26 August 2003	list^{[F]}
114991 Balázs	26 August 2003	list^{[F]}
115058 Tassantal	4 September 2003	list^{[F]}
115059 Nagykároly	5 September 2003	list^{[F]}
115254 Fényi	22 September 2003	list^{[F]}
115885 Ganz	6 November 2003	list^{[F]}

117086 Lóczy	8 June 2004	list^{[B]}
117711 Degenfeld	1 April 2005	list
117712 Podmaniczky	1 April 2005	list
117713 Kövesligethy	2 April 2005	list
117714 Kiskartal	2 April 2005	list
120324 Falusandrás	21 June 2004	list
121817 Szatmáry	2 January 2000	list^{[A]}
125071 Lugosi	8 October 2001	list
126245 Kandókálmán	13 January 2002	list^{[C]}
126315 Bláthy	13 January 2002	list^{[C]}
128062 Szrogh	6 July 2003	list^{[F]}
128426 Vekerdi	18 June 2004	list
129259 Tapolca	25 August 2005	list^{[H]}
131762 Csonka	11 January 2002	list^{[C]}
131763 Donátbánki	11 January 2002	list^{[C]}
132718 Kemény	23 July 2002	list
132824 Galamb	17 August 2002	list
132874 Latinovits	9 September 2002	list
133161 Ruttkai	24 August 2003	list^{[F]}
133250 Rubik	5 September 2003	list^{[F]}
134130 Apáczai	3 January 2005	list
135799 Ráczmiklós	7 September 2002	list
136273 Csermely	25 December 2003	list
136473 Bakosgáspár	1 April 2005	list
136518 Opitz	28 September 2005	list

137066 Gellért-hegy	23 November 1998	list^{[A]}
139028 Haynald	28 February 2001	list^{[D]}
142275 Simonyi	8 September 2002	list
143579 Dérimiksa	28 March 2003	list
145075 Zipernowsky	6 April 2005	list
145488 Kaczendre	4 November 2005	list
145593 Xántus	18 August 2006	list
147421 Gárdonyi	1 April 2003	list
150081 Steindl	19 October 2006	list
151242 Hajós	11 January 2002	list^{[C]}
151659 Egerszegi	25 December 2002	list
152454 Darnyi	3 November 2005	list
154141 Kertész	12 March 2002	list
154493 Portisch	27 March 2003	list
155215 Vámostibor	4 November 2005	list
155217 Radnoti	9 November 2005	list
156580 Madach	3 March 2002	list
157020 Fertőszentmiklós	26 August 2003	list^{[F]}
157141 Sopron	6 August 2004	list^{[I]}
157721 Kolcsey	24 January 2006	list
159629 Brunszvik	16 January 2002	list^{[C]}
159974 Badacsony	24 January 2006	list
160001 Bakonybél	5 April 2006	list
161092 Zsigmond	29 July 2002	list
161349 Mecsek	19 September 2003	list^{[F]}

161913 Hunyadi	5 March 2007	list
161975 Kincsem	8 June 2007	list
163819 Teleki	7 September 2003	list^{[F]}
164268 Hajmási	11 November 2004	list
166028 Karikókatalin	11 January 2002	list^{[C]}
166886 Ybl	25 December 2002	list
167018 Csontoscsaba	23 August 2003	list
167341 Börzsöny	3 November 2003	list
168203 Kereszturi	5 May 2006	list
170644 Tepliczky	25 December 2003	list
170900 Jendrassik	11 November 2004	list
171118 Szigetköz	2 April 2005	list
171429 Hunstead	1 September 2007	list^{[A]}
172593 Vörösmarty	5 November 2003	list^{[E]}
175281 Kolonics	28 May 2005	list
175437 Zsivótzky	21 August 2006	list^{[J]}
175566 Papplaci	1 October 2006	list^{[K]}
175567 Csadaimre	14 October 2006	list^{[J]}
177157 Skoffelza	18 September 2003	list^{[F]}
178156 Borbála	17 October 2006	list^{[J]}
178796 Posztoczky	27 February 2001	list^{[D]}
180824 Kabos	2 April 2005	list
180857 Hofigéza	28 April 2005	list
181298 Ladányi	17 August 2006	list
181392 Katonajozsef	23 September 2006	list^{[J]}

184930 Gobbihilda	4 November 2005	list
185196 Vambery	15 October 2006	list^{[J]}
187125 Marxgyörgy	31 August 2005	list^{[J]}
189320 Lakitsferenc	22 December 2006	list
190504 Hermanottó	22 April 2000	list^{[B]}
191341 Lánczos	24 August 2003	list^{[F]}
191551 Glucklich	6 November 2003	list^{[F]}
191856 Almáriván	11 November 2004	list
191857 Illéserzsébet	12 November 2004	list
192155 Hargittai	21 April 2006	list
194970 Márai	13 January 2002	list^{[C]}
196005 Róbertschiller	12 September 2002	list
196736 Munkácsy	19 September 2003	list^{[F]}
197192 Kazinczy	5 November 2003	list^{[E]}
199630 Szitkay	2 April 2006	list
199632 Mahlerede	2 April 2006	list
199687 Erősszsolt	21 April 2006	list
199688 Kisspéter	21 April 2006	list
199696 Kemenesi	25 April 2006	list
202599 Harkanyi	24 April 2006	list
202790 Babits	25 August 2008	list
206574 Illyés	3 November 2003	list
207481 Kékes	24 April 2006	list
207504 Markusovszky	25 April 2006	list
209054 Lombkató	23 August 2003	list^{[F]}

209089 Csepevaleria	18 September 2003	list^{[F]}
209791 Tokaj	1 April 2005	list
210070 Robertcapa	19 August 2006	list^{[J]}
210421 Freundtamás	19 December 2007	list
210435 Pollackmihaly	28 December 2008	list
214558 Korányi	18 August 2006	list
216194 Ujvarosy	17 October 2006	list
216808 Tolmargyula	14 October 2006	list^{[J]}
217398 Tihany	5 April 2005	list
218274 Albertferenc	29 March 2003	list
219008 Igazantal	23 December 2008	list
221454 Mayerlambert	23 January 2006	list
221528 Kosztolányi	14 October 2006	list^{[J]}
221529 Tamkósirató	15 October 2006	list^{[J]}
221853 Gabrisgyula	1 April 2008	list
224858 Kunmária	28 December 2006	list
225096 Kovácsgéza	24 February 2008	list
225231 Orhazoltán	18 April 2009	list
227218 Rényi	5 September 2005	list
(228004) 2007 QC_{5}	31 August 2007	list^{[A]}
228078 Cavalloni	25 August 2008	list
228893 Gerevich	6 September 2003	list^{[F]}
230656 Kovácspál	19 September 2003	list^{[F]}
231278 Kárpáti	25 January 2006	list
231368 Hunfalvy	22 April 2006	list

231470 Bedding	2 September 2007	list^{[A]}
231571 Tubolyvince	22 October 2008	list^{[L]}
233486 Thankároly	16 October 2006	list^{[J]}
(233583) 2007 RR	1 September 2007	list^{[A]}
233893 Honthyhanna	21 December 2008	list
234294 Pappsándor	31 December 2000	list^{[A]}
235201 Lorántffy	23 September 2003	list^{[F]}
236170 Cholnoky	9 November 2005	list
236307 Berzsenyi	24 January 2006	list
(236807) 2007 RH_{9}	2 September 2007	list^{[A]}
(237264) 2008 WP_{96}	28 November 2008	list^{[L]}
238710 Halassy	4 April 2005	list
238771 Juhászbalázs	12 May 2005	list
240364 Kozmutza	20 September 2003	list^{[F]}
240697 Gemenc	1 April 2005	list
240757 Farkasberci	26 May 2005	list
241363 Érdibálint	19 December 2007	list
241368 Hildjozsef	24 February 2008	list
(242468) 2004 SA_{3}	17 September 2004	list
242523 Kreszgéza	5 January 2005	list
245877 Kvassay	17 August 2006	list
(246642) 2008 YW_{8}	23 December 2008	list
(246652) 2008 YU_{28}	29 December 2008	list
247542 Ripplrónai	8 September 2002	list
248717 Ódryárpád	18 August 2006	list^{[J]}

(248842) 2006 TJ_{11}	15 October 2006	list^{[J]}
(249394) 2009 BD_{115}	27 January 2009	list
(250267) 2003 FD_{7}	28 March 2003	list
250526 Steinerzsuzsanna	11 August 2004	list^{[I]}
251014 Bejczyantal	18 August 2006	list^{[J]}
251015 Gregusspál	19 August 2006	list^{[J]}
(251592) 2009 HK_{12}	18 April 2009	list
253412 Ráskaylea	23 August 2003	list^{[F]}
254846 Csontváry	5 September 2005	list
254876 Strommer	24 September 2005	list
255257 Mechwart	4 November 2005	list
(255261) 2005 VU_{7}	9 November 2005	list
(257014) 2008 FQ_{6}	30 March 2008	list
257211 Kulizoli	21 December 2008	list
257212 Rozsahegyi	22 December 2008	list
260098 Staargyula	18 June 2004	list
260601 Wesselényi	2 April 2005	list
(262388) 2006 UC_{4}	18 October 2006	list
265059 Bajorgizi	18 September 2003	list^{[F]}
265490 Szabados	1 April 2005	list
265594 Keletiágnes	5 September 2005	list
266622 Málna	24 August 2008	list
269232 Tahin	21 August 2008	list
269742 Kroónorbert	23 October 1998	list^{[A]}
271009 Reitterferenc	25 December 2002	list

274290 Lechnerödön	27 August 2008	list
274302 Abaházi	24 August 2008	list
274810 Fedáksári	27 December 2008	list
(276691) 2003 YU_{107}	25 December 2003	list
276975 Heller	11 November 2004	list
277106 Forgó	1 April 2005	list
(277618) 2006 BT_{8}	23 January 2006	list
(277817) 2006 GT	2 April 2006	list
278690 Rockenbauer	12 September 2008	list
(279611) 2011 EQ_{25}	26 April 2000	list
(281025) 2006 GR	2 April 2006	list
281247 Egryjózsef	19 June 2007	list
(281270) 2007 RY_{1}	2 September 2007	list^{[A]}
(281348) 2007 UY_{135}	20 October 2007	list^{[A]}
284357 Semseyandor	23 September 2006	list^{[J]}
(287557) 2003 FG_{7}	28 March 2003	list
287693 Hugonnaivilma	24 August 2003	list^{[F]}
287711 Filotaslili	26 August 2003	list^{[F]}
287787 Karády	20 September 2003	list^{[F]}
290129 Rátzlászló	31 August 2005	list^{[J]}
(291899) 2006 QS_{4}	18 August 2006	list^{[J]}
(291900) 2006 QU_{4}	19 August 2006	list^{[J]}
(292498) 2006 TQ_{9}	1 October 2006	list
(292499) 2006 TQ_{10}	14 October 2006	list^{[J]}
(292616) 2006 UE_{1}	16 October 2006	list^{[J]}

(293718) 2007 RP	1 September 2007	list^{[A]}
(293719) 2007 RQ	1 September 2007	list^{[A]}
(293720) 2007 RX_{1}	1 September 2007	list^{[A]}
(295970) 2008 YR_{28}	28 December 2008	list
(295971) 2008 YV_{28}	29 December 2008	list
(295972) 2008 YJ_{32}	29 December 2008	list
(296898) 2010 CJ_{4}	23 January 2006	list
301946 Bugyi	28 January 2000	list^{[B]}
(303053) 2003 YZ_{107}	25 December 2003	list
303648 Mikszáth	27 May 2005	list
304368 Móricz	26 September 2006	list^{[K]}
(304446) 2006 UP_{3}	16 October 2006	list^{[J]}
(304748) 2006 YE_{14}	22 December 2006	list
(305263) 2007 YQ_{29}	21 December 2007	list
(305264) 2007 YR_{29}	21 December 2007	list
(305530) 2008 FZ_{125}	29 March 2008	list
(305577) 2008 YY_{5}	22 December 2008	list
(306191) 2011 OT_{12}	28 December 2008	list
(307761) 2003 VF	3 November 2003	list^{[E]}
(308722) 2006 HT_{18}	23 April 2006	list
(308878) 2006 SC_{78}	23 September 2006	list^{[J]}
(308946) 2006 TZ_{11}	15 October 2006	list^{[J]}
(310100) 2010 RU_{42}	3 September 2010	list^{[J]}
(312349) 2008 DE_{4}	26 February 2008	list
313116 Pálvenetianer	31 December 2000	list^{[A]}

314163 Kittenberger	1 April 2005	list
(314725) 2006 SB_{78}	23 September 2006	list^{[J]}
(315744) 2008 FQ_{7}	30 March 2008	list
(316586) 2011 UV_{146}	14 September 2010	list
318547 Fidrich	2 April 2005	list
318694 Keszthelyi	29 August 2005	list^{[J]}
318698 Barthalajos	30 August 2005	list
(319023) 2005 VF_{5}	8 November 2005	list
(319925) 2006 YZ_{19}	27 December 2006	list
320260 Bertout	31 August 2007	list^{[A]}
(321195) 2008 YJ_{5}	21 December 2008	list
322912 Jedlik	11 January 2002	list^{[C]}
(324455) 2006 UH_{1}	16 October 2006	list^{[J]}
(325480) 2009 RW_{2}	11 September 2009	list
327512 Bíró	24 January 2006	list
(329600) 2003 FF_{8}	30 March 2003	list
(332286) 2006 TT	1 October 2006	list
(333612) 2007 RB_{11}	5 September 2007	list^{[A]}
334756 Leövey	4 September 2003	list^{[F]}
338373 Fonóalbert	25 December 2002	list
338578 Csapodyvera	20 September 2003	list^{[F]}
(341959) 2008 QM	21 August 2008	list
(342765) 2008 WB_{97}	28 November 2008	list^{[M]}
(342863) 2008 YO_{30}	30 December 2008	list
344641 Szeleczky	23 August 2003	list^{[F]}

345648 Adyendre	1 October 2006	list^{[K]}
(346302) 2008 QS_{3}	25 August 2008	list
348407 Patkósandrás	12 May 2005	list
(349069) 2006 YX_{19}	25 December 2006	list
(349400) 2007 YK_{3}	17 December 2007	list
(349717) 2008 YS_{28}	29 December 2008	list
(350865) 2002 NC_{80}	17 October 2011	list^{[N]}
(351040) 2003 SC_{170}	22 September 2003	list^{[F]}
(351213) 2004 MM_{3}	18 June 2004	list
351785 Reguly	21 April 2006	list
(352160) 2007 RE	1 September 2007	list^{[A]}
(352887) 2008 YP_{32}	30 December 2008	list
(352919) 2008 YM_{157}	23 December 2008	list
(353685) 2011 UY_{304}	31 March 2003	list
(354340) 2003 FM_{7}	29 March 2003	list
(354714) 2005 SU_{19}	24 September 2005	list
(355923) 2008 YN_{25}	24 December 2008	list
(356153) 2009 HD_{12}	16 April 2009	list
(356154) 2009 HO_{12}	18 April 2009	list
(356280) 2010 BK_{89}	31 August 2007	list^{[A]}
358179 Szegőkároly	23 September 2006	list^{[J]}
(358274) 2006 UD_{4}	18 October 2006	list
(358483) 2007 RU_{1}	1 September 2007	list^{[A]}
(358766) 2008 DF_{4}	27 February 2008	list
(361122) 2006 GW_{1}	2 April 2006	list

(361153) 2006 HJ_{152}	24 April 2006	list
(361752) 2007 YZ_{3}	19 December 2007	list
(363748) 2005 AF	3 January 2005	list
(364299) 2006 UG_{4}	17 October 2006	list
(365210) 2009 HM_{12}	18 April 2009	list
(367188) 2006 YU_{44}	23 December 2006	list
(371368) 2006 QD_{1}	18 August 2006	list
(373867) 2003 SG_{33}	18 September 2003	list^{[F]}
(374943) 2007 BX_{49}	26 January 2007	list
(375066) 2007 RZ_{4}	31 August 2007	list^{[A]}
(375637) 2008 YC_{5}	22 December 2008	list
376694 Kassák	30 January 2011	list^{[O]}
378920 Vassimre	24 October 2008	list^{[L]}
(385854) 2006 QQ_{10}	19 August 2006	list^{[J]}
(386277) 2008 QD	20 August 2008	list
(386463) 2008 YA_{9}	23 December 2008	list
(388336) 2006 TY_{11}	15 October 2006	list^{[J]}
(388564) 2007 QB_{5}	31 August 2007	list^{[A]}
(391506) 2007 RW_{9}	5 September 2007	list^{[A]}
390743 Telkesmária	20 September 2003	list^{[F]}
391988 Illmárton	27 December 2008	list
399565 Dévényanna	20 September 2003	list^{[F]}
402008 Laborfalviróza	26 August 2003	list^{[F]}
(402851) 2007 RE_{11}	5 September 2007	list^{[A]}
(403047) 2008 AB_{32}	14 January 2008	list

405571 Erdőspál	31 August 2005	list^{[J]}
(406012) 2006 TP_{10}	14 October 2006	list^{[J]}
(409902) 2006 TX_{11}	15 October 2006	list^{[J]}
(410179) 2007 RZ_{1}	2 September 2007	list^{[A]}
(410324) 2007 UX_{6}	20 October 2007	list^{[A]}
(411243) 2010 RY_{40}	3 September 2010	list^{[J]}
413233 Várkonyiágnes	20 September 2003	list^{[F]}
(418879) 2008 YN_{28}	28 December 2008	list
418891 Vizi	31 December 2008	list
423380 Juhászárpád	12 May 2005	list
423433 Harsányi	29 August 2005	list^{[J]}
(428949) 2008 YV_{8}	23 December 2008	list
(432229) 2009 HL_{36}	19 April 2009	list
(434621) 2005 VB_{5}	4 November 2005	list
(434900) 2006 TU	1 October 2006	list
(435864) 2008 YZ_{8}	23 December 2008	list
(441408) 2008 GA	1 April 2008	list
446957 Priellekornélia	19 September 2003	list^{[F]}
(447774) 2007 RL_{13}	5 September 2007	list^{[A]}
450297 Csakanybela	8 August 2004	list^{[B]}
(456646) 2007 RJ_{5}	2 September 2007	list^{[A]}
461650 Paisdezső	3 April 2005	list
(462106) 2007 RF_{11}	5 September 2007	list^{[A]}
464745 Péterrózsa	5 September 2003	list^{[F]}
469773 Kitaibel	30 August 2005	list^{[J]}

(470326) 2007 RB_{5}	1 September 2007	list^{[A]}
474440 Nemesnagyágnes	5 July 2003	list^{[F]}
(475993) 2007 RF	1 September 2007	list^{[A]}
(476321) 2007 YX_{3}	17 December 2007	list
483454 Hosszúkatinka	13 January 2002	list^{[C]}
485320 Vértesernő	30 January 2011	list^{[O]}
(489321) 2006 TO_{10}	14 October 2006	list^{[J]}
(498856) 2008 YX_{4}	21 December 2008	list
499526 Romhanyi	2 September 2010	list^{[J]}
(503628) 2016 GU_{140}	7 March 2011	list^{[P]}
(504511) 2008 QT_{13}	26 August 2008	list
(509919) 2009 HF_{12}	18 April 2009	list
(522238) 2016 AR_{270}	1 November 2010	list^{[J]}
523954 Guman	22 October 1998	list^{[B]}
(524608) 2003 QG_{108}	27 August 2003	list^{[F]}
524638 Kaffkamargit	21 September 2003	list^{[F]}
(526141) 2005 VC_{5}	8 November 2005	list
(527041) 2007 RZ_{290}	2 September 2007	list^{[A]}
(528664) 2008 WV_{93}	28 November 2008	list^{[N]}
(529829) 2010 RE_{37}	3 September 2010	list^{[J]}
541184 Babjak	30 January 2011	list^{[O]}
(541185) 2011 BO_{44}	30 January 2011	list^{[J]}
(541186) 2011 BW_{48}	30 January 2011	list^{[J]}
(541187) 2011 BL_{49}	30 January 2011	list^{[J]}
541200 Komjádibéla	24 August 2008	list

(541220) 2011 CT	2 February 2011	list^{[J]}
(541252) 2011 DE_{13}	30 January 2011	list^{[J]}
(541303) 2011 FY_{24}	29 March 2011	list^{[J]}
(541304) 2011 FG_{25}	29 March 2011	list^{[J]}
(541305) 2011 FN_{26}	30 March 2011	list^{[J]}
541550 Schickbéla	30 August 2011	list
541565 Gucklerkároly	26 August 2011	list
541571 Schulekfrigyes	30 September 2011	list
541582 Tóthimre	4 October 2011	list
541587 Paparó	1 October 2011	list
541618 Magyaribéla	3 October 2011	list
541627 Halmospál	2 October 2011	list
541691 Ranschburg	5 October 2011	list
541776 Oláhkatalin	7 October 2011	list^{[AB]}
(541963) 2012 FY_{22}	30 October 2010	list^{[J]}
541982 Grendel	16 March 2012	list^{[O]}
541992 Lukácsbéla	27 March 2012	list
542026 Kaszásattila	24 March 2011	list^{[O]}
(542233) 2013 AH_{106}	29 September 2011	list
542246 Kulcsár	26 August 2008	list
(542298) 2013 BN_{48}	31 December 2008	list
542461 Slovinský	3 October 2010	list^{[O]}
(542493) 2013 DE_{5}	4 October 2011	list
(542680) 2013 GG_{101}	25 December 2011	list
543198 Rastislavmráz	5 September 2013	list^{[X]}

543302 Hamvasbéla	4 December 2013	list^{[Y]}
(544309) 2014 UM_{62}	20 October 2014	list
543698 Miromesaroš	6 October 2011	list^{[O]}
543914 Tessedik	15 March 2012	list^{[O]}
544325 Péczbéla	24 March 2011	list^{[J]}
(544541) 2014 WP_{73}	24 March 2011	list^{[J]}
(544561) 2014 WL_{121}	24 March 2011	list^{[J]}
(544567) 2014 WR_{127}	24 March 2011	list^{[J]}
544618 Bugátpál	29 October 2014	list^{[Y]}
(544764) 2014 WN_{372}	16 July 2013	list^{[Q]}
(545060) 2014 YN_{17}	3 February 2011	list^{[J]}
545167 Bonfini	30 January 2011	list^{[J]}
(545169) 2011 BT_{44}	30 January 2011	list^{[J]}
(545170) 2011 BW_{44}	30 January 2011	list^{[J]}
(545177) 2011 BS_{65}	1 February 2011	list^{[J]}
(545283) 2011 FJ_{26}	30 March 2011	list^{[J]}
545561 Nesbø	26 August 2011	listlist^{[O]}
(545628) 2011 SD_{61}	28 August 2011	list
(545630) 2011 SA_{63}	25 August 2011	list
545784 Kelemenjános	18 October 2011	list^{[N]}
(545828) 2011 UD_{154}	1 October 2011	list
(545838) 2011 UV_{171}	29 September 2011	list
(545948) 2011 US_{405}	3 October 2011	list
546025 Ábrahámpéter	17 November 2011	list^{[R]}
546235 Kolbenheyer	28 October 2010	list^{[O]}

546275 Kozák	30 October 2010	list^{[J]}
(546283) 2010 UC_{99}	29 October 2010	list^{[J]}
546286 Fuchsjenő	31 October 2010	list^{[J]}
546396 Szilágyiáron	30 October 2010	list^{[J]}
546471 Szipál	1 November 2010	list^{[J]}
546498 Demjénferenc	31 October 2010	list^{[O]}
546515 Almásy	31 October 2010	list^{[J]}
(546836) 2010 YV_{3}	30 December 2010	list^{[J]}
547398 Turánpál	3 September 2010	list^{[J]}
547400 Szakcsilakatos	4 September 2010	list^{[J]}
(547512) 2010 SE_{36}	30 September 2010	list^{[J]}
547599 Virághalmy	12 October 2010	list^{[P]}
547612 Károligáspár	11 October 2010	list^{[S]}
547664 Ozdín	28 October 2010	list^{[O]}
547705 Paálgyörgy	31 October 2010	list^{[J]}
(547963) 2010 YU_{2}	30 December 2010	list^{[J]}
(547964) 2010 YZ_{2}	30 December 2010	list^{[J]}
(548260) 2010 FH_{2}	28 December 2008	list
548690 Hazucha	28 October 2010	list^{[O]}
(548703) 2010 UO_{64}	31 October 2010	list^{[J]}
(549006) 2011 BK_{41}	30 January 2011	list^{[J]}
(549007) 2011 BJ_{43}	30 January 2011	list^{[J]}
(549008) 2011 BN_{48}	31 January 2011	list^{[J]}
(549009) 2011 BP_{49}	31 January 2011	list^{[J]}
(549010) 2011 BV_{49}	31 January 2011	list^{[J]}

(549046) 2011 BO_{117}	3 January 2011	list^{[J]}
549107 Hackitamás	31 January 2011	list^{[O]}
(549121) 2011 CK_{87}	18 October 2006	list
549185 Herczeg	6 March 2011	list^{[P]}
549228 Labuda	24 March 2011	list^{[O]}
549229 Bánjános	24 March 2011	list^{[O]}
(549230) 2011 FK_{5}	24 March 2011	list^{[J]}
(549234) 2011 FX_{16}	24 March 2011	list^{[J]}
(549237) 2011 FX_{24}	29 March 2011	list^{[J]}
(549239) 2011 FJ_{25}	29 March 2011	list^{[J]}
(549240) 2011 FX_{25}	29 March 2011	list^{[J]}
(549241) 2011 FU_{26}	30 March 2011	list^{[J]}
(549249) 2011 FO_{40}	30 March 2011	list^{[J]}
549663 Barczaszabolcs	10 August 2011	list^{[T]}
(549674) 2011 QK_{97}	31 August 2011	list
549744 Heimpál	25 September 2011	list^{[R]}
(549754) 2011 SY_{157}	27 August 2011	list
(549870) 2011 UD_{193}	1 October 2011	list
(549872) 2011 UJ_{195}	5 October 2011	list
549961 Földesistván	23 November 2011	list^{[T]}
(550005) 2011 WK_{152}	26 December 2003	list
(550078) 2011 YH_{83}	13 September 2015	list
550083 Szécsényi-Nagy	31 December 2011	list^{[N]}
(550364) 2012 FO_{14}	18 March 2012	list
(550840) 2012 TB_{254}	11 October 2012	list

550942 Kurtág	20 October 2012	list^{[U]}
551014 Gorman	18 October 2012	list^{[V]}
551091 Flórferenc	22 October 2012	list^{[W]}
(551256) 2013 AT_{62}	9 December 2012	list
(552086) 2013 SJ_{61}	5 August 2013	list
(552343) 2013 WK_{104}	31 October 2013	list
(552529) 2010 CL_{258}	31 January 2011	list^{[J]}
552681 Sósvera	21 October 2012	list^{[W]}
552727 Hauszmann	2 September 2010	list^{[J]}
552733 Grétsylászló	4 September 2010	list^{[J]}
552748 Garasdezső	6 September 2010	list^{[J]}
552750 Valasek	6 September 2010	list^{[J]}
552847 Steinaurél	28 October 2010	list^{[O]}
552855 Hoitsy	31 October 2010	list^{[O]}
(552892) 2010 VH_{97}	30 October 2010	list^{[J]}
(553076) 2011 BQ_{44}	30 January 2011	list^{[J]}
(553077) 2011 BP_{47}	31 January 2011	list^{[J]}
(553078) 2011 BB_{48}	31 January 2011	list^{[J]}
(553079) 2011 BG_{49}	31 January 2011	list^{[J]}
(553086) 2011 BL_{66}	31 January 2011	list^{[J]}
(553161) 2011 CB_{45}	31 January 2011	list^{[J]}
(553177) 2011 CS_{77}	3 February 2011	list^{[J]}
(553245) 2011 FQ_{25}	29 March 2011	list^{[J]}
(553250) 2011 FY_{48}	29 March 2011	list^{[J]}
553438 Bércziszaniszló	9 August 2011	list^{[T]}

(553462) 2011 QG_{47}	26 August 2011	list
(553627) 2011 TF_{19}	3 October 2011	list
(553684) 2011 UN_{171}	29 September 2011	list
(554052) 2012 JG_{23}	30 January 2011	list^{[J]}
(554425) 2012 TA_{254}	11 October 2012	list
(554426) 2012 TW_{254}	11 October 2012	list
(554460) 2012 TG_{310}	11 October 2012	list
(554646) 2012 VJ_{76}	26 August 2011	list
554704 Széppataki	23 October 2012	list^{[U]}
(554757) 2013 AK_{52}	22 December 2012	list^{[W]}
554879 Kissgyula	2 October 2011	list^{[I]}
554959 Lasica	4 December 2010	list^{[O]}
555292 Bakels	31 October 2013	list^{[V]}
(558177) 2014 YA	21 October 2011	list
(558187) 2014 YG_{10}	31 October 2013	list
558195 Eugengindl	28 September 2013	list^{[O]}
(558351) 2015 AV_{82}	30 March 2011	list^{[J]}
558398 Nagysándor	31 August 2013	list^{[X]}
(559717) 2015 DO_{175}	31 August 2011	list
(560388) 2015 FX_{317}	21 October 2012	list^{[W]}
(560522) 2015 GB_{33}	20 October 2012	list^{[U]}
(560637) 2015 HQ_{88}	27 August 2011	list
(561537) 2015 TX_{205}	2 October 2011	list
561911 Kézandor	1 November 2010	list^{[J]}
562446 Pilinszky	30 September 2014	list^{[Y]}

(562936) 2016 BG_{2}	3 September 2010	list^{[J]}
(562979) 2016 BB_{29}	3 September 2010	list^{[J]}
563318 ten Kate	27 October 2014	list^{[V]}
563707 Némethgeri	28 September 2013	list^{[X]}
563716 Szinyeimersepál	31 October 2013	list^{[O]}
(563810) 2016 EZ_{80}	30 December 2010	list^{[J]}
(564356) 2016 GV_{124}	30 January 2011	list^{[J]}
(564808) 2016 PY_{67}	26 August 2011	list^{[O]}
(564904) 2016 UU_{41}	2 September 2016	list
(564904) 2016 UU_{41}	2 September 2016	list
(564905) 2016 UU_{51}	30 December 2010	list^{[J]}
565780 Kopaszimre	4 October 2011	list^{[I]}
566631 Svábhegy	1 November 2010	list^{[J]}
(566964) 2018 VO_{83}	29 March 2011	list^{[J]}
(566986) 2018 VX_{87}	31 October 2013	list
567010 Kanyósándor	7 March 2011	list^{[P]}
567490 Bánkyvilma	25 October 2012	list^{[W]}
(567581) 2002 AC_{216}	1 October 2011	list
(568345) 2003 UK_{422}	22 December 2012	list^{[W]}
(569824) 2005 XO_{123}	28 September 2013	list
(569980) 2006 BA_{27}	25 January 2006	list
(570562) 2006 SM_{430}	26 August 2011	list
(570621) 2006 UE_{4}	18 October 2006	list
(571890) 2007 YE_{3}	19 December 2007	list
(572580) 2008 RM_{149}	12 September 2008	list

(573146) 2008 YY_{28}	28 December 2008	list
(573147) 2008 YL_{30}	29 December 2008	list
(573200) 2008 YJ_{148}	28 December 2008	list
(573381) 2009 DP_{46}	27 February 2009	list
(573689) 2009 RC_{4}	12 September 2009	list
574506 Sopronilíceum	8 August 2004	list^{[I]}
574546 Kondorgusztáv	6 September 2010	list^{[J]}
(574594) 2010 SY_{35}	30 September 2010	list
574635 Jánossy	6 September 2010	list^{[J]}
(574834) 2010 YV_{2}	30 December 2010	list^{[J]}
(574877) 2011 BH_{47}	31 January 2011	list^{[J]}
(574878) 2011 BU_{47}	31 January 2011	list^{[J]}
574691 Horgerantal	31 October 2010	list^{[J]}
(574880) 2011 BG_{50}	31 January 2011	list^{[J]}
(575014) 2011 FC_{25}	29 March 2011	list^{[J]}
(575015) 2011 FH_{25}	29 March 2011	list^{[J]}
575498 Lampérthgyula	5 October 2011	list^{[I]}
(575502) 2011 TT_{20}	5 October 2011	list
575511 Bükk	18 October 2011	list^{[N]}
(575526) 2011 UH_{70}	21 October 2011	list
(575550) 2011 UQ_{106}	5 October 2011	list
(575574) 2011 UQ_{138}	21 October 2011	list
(575637) 2011 UF_{273}	26 August 2011	list
(575653) 2011 UL_{302}	4 October 2011	list
(575777) 2011 VC_{5}	21 October 2011	list

(576126) 2012 FL_{14}	16 March 2012	list
(576279) 2012 KD_{46}	19 May 2012	list
(576280) 2012 KH_{50}	19 May 2012	list
(576313) 2012 MR_{2}	17 June 2012	list
(576614) 2012 TJ_{254}	11 October 2012	list
(576646) 2012 TF_{310}	11 October 2012	list
(576656) 2012 TK_{332}	11 October 2012	list
(576661) 2012 TO_{333}	11 October 2012	list
(576716) 2012 UG_{32}	11 October 2012	list
(576725) 2012 UB_{61}	1 October 2011	list
576793 Károlyiamy	20 October 2012	list^{[U]}
576870 Országlili	18 October 2012	list^{[W]}
(577019) 2012 XA_{160}	9 December 2012	list
(577169) 2013 AT_{184}	4 October 2011	list
(577622) 2013 HU_{124}	29 September 2011	list
577754 Janačerbová	6 August 2013	list^{[X]}
577881 Pálinkáslibor	27 September 2013	list^{[X]}
(577898) 2013 SC_{102}	28 September 2013	list
(577901) 2013 SJ_{103}	28 September 2013	list
(577933) 2013 TP_{105}	28 September 2013	list
(577986) 2013 UJ_{11}	28 September 2013	list
(578083) 2013 WG_{27}	31 October 2013	list
578164 Rerrichbéla	1 December 2013	list^{[Y]}
(578233) 2013 YH_{64}	27 December 2013	list
(578246) 2013 YW_{77}	11 October 2012	list

(578429) 2014 DH_{4}	26 August 2011	list
(578539) 2014 DN_{127}	11 October 2012	list
578622 Fergezsuzsa	21 October 2012	list^{[W]}
(578676) 2014 EG_{138}	2 October 2011	list
(579192) 2014 OE_{175}	31 August 2011	list
579513 Saselemér	1 November 2010	list^{[J]}
(579534) 2014 TY_{22}	4 December 2010	list^{[J]}
(579623) 2014 UO_{199}	3 October 2010	list^{[J]}
579724 Rómerflóris	18 March 2012	list^{[O]}
(579725) 2014 WR_{183}	16 March 2012	list
579785 Kepesgyula	31 October 2010	list^{[J]}
(579806) 2014 WM_{423}	16 March 2012	list
(579942) 2014 YH_{53}	30 January 2011	list^{[J]}
(580012) 2015 AP_{146}	1 September 2013	list
(580121) 2015 BG_{19}	1 February 2011	list
580311 Saselemér	31 January 2011	list^{[J]}
580619 Harangiszabolcs	1 October 2011	list
(581651) 2015 KR_{42}	26 August 2011	list
(581762) 2015 KQ_{129}	21 August 2006	list^{[J]}
(581875) 2015 LO_{37}	26 August 2011	list
(582726) 2016 AG_{186}	13 December 2012	list
582910 Tormazsófia	17 November 2011	list^{[R]}
(583741) 2016 NJ_{79}	29 August 2011	list
(583949) 2016 QO_{56}	30 September 2011	list
(583997) 2016 QA_{95}	29 August 2016	list^{[Y]}

(584148) 2016 TD_{12}	5 October 2011	list
(584258) 2016 UO_{44}	3 October 2011	list
586003 Monspartsarolta	28 September 2016	list^{[Z]}
(586683) 2004 QG_{30}	5 October 2011	list
(588379) 2007 YQ_{79}	26 August 2011	list
(588541) 2008 FA_{126}	30 March 2008	list
(588656) 2008 QF_{29}	26 August 2008	list
589718 Csopak	6 September 2010	list^{[J]}
589780 Ajka	7 October 2010	list^{[J]}
589841 Strobl	28 October 2010	list^{[O]}
(589847) 2010 UP_{64}	31 October 2010	list^{[J]}
589887 Fellnerjakab	31 October 2010	list^{[J]}
(589964) 2010 XX_{40}	4 December 2010	list^{[J]}
(590002) 2011 BO_{47}	31 January 2011	list^{[J]}
(590242) 2011 UJ_{194}	21 October 2011	list
(590257) 2011 UL_{286}	4 October 2011	list
590269 Steinberger	27 September 2011	list^{[R]}
(590311) 2011 VT_{6}	21 October 2011	list
(590579) 2012 ES_{15}	15 March 2012	list
591347 Tarczylajos	31 October 2010	list^{[O]}
(591381) 2013 OB	26 December 2011	list
(591396) 2013 PR_{103}	5 August 2013	list
591808 Dienesvaléria	20 October 2012	list^{[U]}
591964 Jakucs	7 September 2010	list^{[J]}
(591965) 2014 JV_{49}	10 November 2005	list

592750 Seiichifujiwara	7 August 2013	list^{[X]}
(593406) 2015 ON_{100}	30 October 2010	list^{[J]}
(593820) 2016 AB_{59}	21 December 2008	list
(594345) 2016 RX_{15}	26 August 2011	list
(594391) 2016 TO_{57}	28 December 2006	list
(594574) 2017 OS_{32}	29 October 2010	list^{[J]}
(598648) 2008 YW_{4}	21 December 2008	list
(599722) 2010 UJ_{29}	28 October 2010	list^{[J]}
(599725) 2010 UG_{64}	31 October 2010	list^{[J]}
(599740) 2010 UA_{121}	29 October 2010	list^{[J]}
(599913) 2011 BM_{42}	30 January 2011	list^{[J]}
(600019) 2011 FJ_{5}	24 March 2011	list^{[J]}
(600022) 2011 FX_{22}	29 March 2011	list^{[J]}
(600334) 2011 UD_{118}	30 September 2011	list
600379 Csortosgyula	18 October 2011	list^{[N]}
(600384) 2011 UK_{407}	3 October 2011	list
(601021) 2012 UQ_{29}	17 October 2012	list
601036 Sassflóra	21 October 2012	list^{[W]}
(601241) 2013 AF_{18}	31 August 2011	list
(602001) 2014 AS_{46}	27 December 2013	list
602922 Juhászgyula	30 September 2014	list^{[Y]}
603021 Galyatető	31 December 2011	list^{[N]}
(603061) 2014 WC_{218}	20 October 2014	list
(603173) 2015 AV_{53}	30 October 2010	list^{[J]}
(603253) 2015 BP_{91}	3 February 2011	list^{[J]}
603260 Jónáskároly	28 September 2013	list^{[X]}

(604153) 2015 LB_{39}	27 September 2013	list
(604305) 2015 OO_{101}	25 December 2011	list
(604344) 2015 PW_{33}	30 August 2011	list
(604406) 2015 PY_{218}	25 August 2011	list
(604855) 2015 UG_{70}	31 October 2010	list^{[J]}
(605606) 2016 QC_{9}	31 January 2011	list
(605649) 2016 QB_{79}	4 October 2011	list
605901 Montághimre	31 December 2000	list^{[A]}
(605906) 2016 WK_{62}	31 August 2011	list
(606140) 2017 OF_{52}	18 December 2007	list
(607089) 1998 QH_{112}	29 September 2011	list
(607234) 2000 AO	31 December 1999	list^{[A]}
(610992) 2006 QZ	17 August 2006	list^{[J]}
(611251) 2006 TF_{11}	14 October 2006	list^{[J]}
(611279) 2006 UA_{2}	17 October 2006	list^{[J]}
612787 Haumannpéter	8 August 2004	list^{[I]}
(613592) 2006 UM_{1}	17 October 2006	list^{[J]}
(614308) 2008 YS_{9}	23 December 2008	list
(614890) 2000 YV_{118}	31 December 2000	list^{[A]}
(615460) 2003 SC_{127}	19 September 2003	list^{[B]}
615914 Sziszferenc	17 September 2004	list
(617219) 2003 YC_{108}	26 December 2003	list
(617220) 2003 YV_{110}	25 December 2003	list
(618168) 2006 YY_{58}	2 October 2011	list
(618970) 2004 VZ_{136}	1 September 2013	list
(619826) 2006 BX_{8}	23 January 2006	list

(619834) 2006 BY_{139}	19 January 2006	list
622006 Vákárlajos	18 October 2011	list^{[N]}
(620255) 2002 NF_{80}	26 August 2011	list
(620347) 2002 RR_{300}	31 August 2011	list
(621309) 2008 QL_{3}	24 August 2008	list
(621795) 2010 TQ_{205}	11 October 2010	list
(621930) 2011 SU_{212}	27 August 2011	list
(622357) 2013 RN_{19}	3 September 2013	list
(623103) 2015 MG_{117}	30 August 2011	list
(623152) 2015 PT_{30}	26 August 2011	list
(623735) 2017 XJ_{27}	30 October 2010	list^{[J]}
(625015) 2005 AG	3 January 2005	list
(625162) 2005 QA_{76}	29 August 2005	list^{[J]}
(625165) 2005 QB_{87}	30 August 2005	list^{[J]}
(625719) 2006 QT_{4}	17 August 2006	list^{[J]}
(626201) 2006 YV_{44}	25 December 2006	list
627520 Corbey	4 September 2013	list^{[V]}
(627761) 2010 UA_{40}	29 October 2010	list^{[J]}
(627871) 2011 UP_{374}	1 October 2011	list
(627949) 2012 TP_{254}	11 October 2012	list
(627949) 2012 TP_{254}	11 October 2012	list
(628208) 2014 PR_{45}	29 October 2010	list^{[J]}
(628240) 2014 QS_{281}	24 August 2014	list
(628915) 2017 DW_{93}	4 October 2011	list
(628927) 2017 FD_{9}	22 December 2006	list^{[AA]}
(629063) 1996 XZ_{37}	4 October 2011	list

629141 Mihalikenikő	31 December 1999	list^{[A]}
(629479) 2002 NO_{78}	4 April 2005	list
(631294) 2006 YQ_{57}	22 December 2012	list^{[W]}
631626 Benedektibor	28 March 2003	list
(632536) 2008 QQ_{3}	24 August 2008	list
(632859) 2008 YZ_{5}	23 December 2008	list
(632862) 2008 YZ_{25}	27 December 2008	list
(632863) 2008 YA_{26}	27 December 2008	list
(633974) 2010 UH_{38}	29 October 2010	list^{[J]}
(633975) 2010 UD_{40}	29 October 2010	list^{[J]}
(634034) 2010 XB_{22}	4 December 2010	list^{[J]}
(634047) 2010 YM_{2}	30 December 2010	list^{[J]}
(634052) 2011 AH_{36}	3 January 2011	list^{[J]}
(634079) 2011 BE_{44}	30 January 2011	list^{[J]}
(634080) 2011 BV_{44}	31 January 2011	list^{[J]}
(634085) 2011 BO_{66}	1 February 2011	list^{[J]}
(634220) 2011 FF_{25}	29 March 2011	list^{[J]}
(634221) 2011 FP_{25}	29 March 2011	list^{[J]}
(634222) 2011 FW_{26}	30 March 2011	list^{[J]}
(634223) 2011 FY_{26}	30 March 2011	list^{[J]}
(634223) 2011 FY_{26}	30 March 2011	list^{[J]}
(634224) 2011 FZ_{26}	30 March 2011	list^{[J]}
(634405) 2011 QB_{55}	26 August 2011	list
(634500) 2011 TV_{1}	29 August 2011	list
(634552) 2011 UQ_{394}	3 October 2011	list
(634741) 2012 JY	3 February 2011	list^{[J]}
(634934) 2012 TH_{254}	11 October 2012	list

635057 Bangailona	21 October 2012	list^{[W]}
(635082) 2012 XV_{22}	25 August 2011	list
(635228) 2013 CC_{51}	2 October 2011	list^{[I]}
(635229) 2013 CD_{52}	23 November 2011	list^{[T]}
635338 Pécsieszter	15 January 2002	list^{[C]}
(635434) 2013 PA_{71}	31 January 2011	list^{[J]}
(635510) 2013 SA_{35}	29 October 2010	list^{[J]}
635771 Prahácsmargit	23 October 2012	list^{[U]}
(636970) 2015 BM_{38}	30 March 2011	list^{[J]}
(637248) 2015 DX_{207}	27 May 2005	list
639292 Szabózoltán	23 August 2003	list^{[F]}
(639311) 2017 BE_{106}	31 October 2010	list^{[J]}
(639363) 2017 CJ_{31}	31 December 2011	list
(639843) 2017 VT_{3}	21 December 2012	list^{[W]}
(640396) 2000 WH_{202}	31 August 2011	list
(640426) 2001 DS_{86}	27 February 2001	list^{[D]}
(640712) 2002 AW_{204}	15 January 2002	list^{[C]}
(641190) 2003 FY_{102}	29 March 2003	list
(641283) 2003 NY_{6}	9 July 2003	list^{[F]}
(641300) 2003 QX_{69}	26 August 2003	list^{[F]}
(643313) 2006 BL_{26}	24 January 2006	list
(643313) 2006 BL_{26}	24 January 2006	list
(644110) 2006 TH_{10}	14 October 2006	list^{[J]}
(644838) 2006 YG_{14}	22 December 2006	list^{[AA]}
(645008) 2007 CQ_{45}	26 January 2007	list
(647812) 2008 YD_{5}	22 December 2008	list
(649028) 2010 UZ_{40}	30 October 2010	list^{[J]}

(649037) 2010 UA_{64}	31 October 2010	list^{[J]}
(649038) 2010 UH_{68}	31 October 2010	list^{[J]}
(649068) 2010 VP_{69}	31 October 2010	list^{[J]}
(649187) 2011 AF_{6}	3 January 2011	list^{[J]}
(649232) 2011 BK_{46}	30 January 2011	list^{[J]}
(649233) 2011 BO_{46}	30 January 2011	list^{[J]}
(649236) 2011 BE_{50}	31 January 2011	list^{[J]}
(649407) 2011 FL_{26}	30 March 2011	list^{[J]}
(649408) 2011 FQ_{27}	30 March 2011	list^{[J]}
(649806) 2011 SV_{232}	30 September 2011	list
(649832) 2011 SD_{284}	30 August 2011	list
(649860) 2011 SA_{342}	30 September 2011	list
(649918) 2011 UU_{130}	5 October 2011	list
(649939) 2011 UW_{204}	4 October 2011	list
(650166) 2011 YV_{80}	25 December 2011	list
(650175) 2012 AV_{14}	26 December 2011	list
(650486) 2012 PF_{9}	27 February 2008	list
(650766) 2012 TE_{254}	11 October 2012	list
(650787) 2012 TK_{282}	11 October 2012	list
(650891) 2012 UW_{26}	11 October 2012	list
(650891) 2012 UW_{26}	11 October 2012	list
(650894) 2012 UU_{29}	11 October 2012	list
(650963) 2012 UB_{134}	11 October 2012	list
(650970) 2012 UE_{146}	11 October 2012	list
(650993) 2012 UC_{173}	25 October 2012	list

(651324) 2012 YK_{22}	26 August 2011	list
(651367) 2013 AN_{46}	30 August 2011	list
651370 Kolen	13 December 2012	list^{[V]}
(651410) 2013 AV_{104}	22 December 2012	list^{[W]}
(652006) 2013 RJ_{18}	2 August 2013	list
(652021) 2013 RL_{68}	4 September 2013	list
(652057) 2013 SD_{27}	21 September 2003	list^{[F]}
(653076) 2014 HH_{301}	4 October 2011	list
(653217) 2014 LX_{19}	30 October 2010	list^{[J]}
653564 Genersich	18 September 2003	list^{[F]}
(654407) 2015 BY_{156}	30 December 2010	list^{[J]}
(657063) 2016 GZ_{179}	3 February 2011	list^{[J]}
(657254) 2016 NB_{77}	30 September 2011	list
(657430) 2016 QQ_{25}	26 August 2011	list
(657848) 2017 BP_{51}	31 March 2006	list
(657886) 2017 BB_{167}	21 January 2017	list
(658615) 2017 SU_{102}	11 October 2012	list
(658856) 2017 WX_{22}	9 December 2012	list
(658910) 2017 XG_{46}	31 August 2011	list
(659404) 2019 BU_{5}	11 October 2012	list
(660299) 2000 TH_{77}	5 August 2013	list
(660299) 2000 TH_{77}	5 August 2013	list
(660515) 2002 AN_{14}	11 January 2002	list^{[C]}
(660516) 2002 AZ_{66}	13 January 2002	list^{[C]}
(661521) 2004 TE_{216}	18 September 2004	list

(661588) 2004 VF_{133}	5 March 2013	list
(661806) 2005 QE_{75}	25 August 2005	list^{[H]}
(661826) 2005 QD_{152}	31 August 2005	list^{[J]}
(661838) 2005 QC_{191}	29 August 2005	list
(662822) 2006 TW_{11}	14 October 2006	list^{[J]}
(664370) 2008 KP_{11}	25 May 2008	list
(664448) 2008 QY_{13}	27 August 2008	list
(668269) 2011 VG_{23}	21 October 2011	list
(668340) 2011 WS_{102}	4 October 2011	list
(668377) 2011 WC_{150}	6 October 2011	list
(668848) 2012 JK_{42}	31 January 2011	list^{[J]}
(668865) 2012 KV_{9}	3 February 2011	list^{[J]}
(668874) 2012 KX_{25}	11 November 2004	list
(669624) 2013 AJ_{94}	6 January 2013	list
(669642) 2013 AF_{121}	31 August 2011	list
669952 Kootker	21 February 2013	list^{[V]}
(670482) 2013 SC_{44}	27 September 2013	list
(671372) 2014 KA_{31}	25 August 2011	list
(672743) 2014 WW_{359}	24 March 2011	list^{[J]}
(672816) 2014 WJ_{495}	1 September 2013	list
(673053) 2015 AO_{201}	3 February 2011	list^{[J]}
(673202) 2015 BP_{171}	5 August 2013	list
(660299) 2000 TH_{77}	5 August 2013	list
(674070) 2015 KD_{66}	5 October 2011	list
(674340) 2015 OZ_{50}	25 December 2011	list

(674500) 2015 PF_{209}	29 October 2010	list^{[J]}
(674548) 2015 PA_{318}	31 October 2010	list^{[J]}
(675150) 2015 UG_{4}	5 October 2011	list
(676495) 2016 GG_{232}	1 February 2011	list
(676868) 2016 PV_{109}	3 October 2011	list
(677061) 2016 RZ_{44}	21 October 2011	list
(677115) 2016 SU_{33}	21 October 2011	list
(677361) 2016 UX_{57}	22 December 2012	list^{[W]}
(677390) 2016 UE_{87}	4 April 2006	list
(677722) 2017 CO_{10}	12 March 2013	list
677772 Bettonvil	18 October 2012	list^{[V]}
679552 Efspringer	31 October 2013	list^{[V]}
(679671) 2020 DD_{17}	1 February 2011	list
(682616) 2006 VF_{178}	4 October 2011	list
(683657) 2007 YK_{29}	19 December 2007	list
(684336) 2008 SE_{168}	19 September 2004	list
(686339) 2010 UP_{38}	29 October 2010	list^{[J]}
(686344) 2010 UB_{48}	30 October 2010	list^{[J]}
(686645) 2011 AR_{81}	3 January 2011	list^{[J]}
(686683) 2011 BQ_{41}	30 January 2011	list^{[J]}
(686684) 2011 BS_{41}	30 January 2011	list^{[J]}
(686685) 2011 BU_{41}	30 January 2011	list^{[J]}
(686687) 2011 BD_{42}	30 January 2011	list^{[J]}
(686688) 2011 BW_{42}	30 January 2011	list^{[J]}
(686689) 2011 BH_{43}	30 January 2011	list^{[J]}

(686690) 2011 BB_{46}	31 January 2011	list^{[J]}
(686691) 2011 BB_{47}	31 January 2011	list^{[J]}
(686692) 2011 BG_{47}	31 January 2011	list^{[J]}
(686693) 2011 BJ_{47}	31 January 2011	list^{[J]}
(686695) 2011 BY_{49}	31 January 2011	list^{[J]}
(686699) 2011 BO_{65}	1 February 2011	list^{[J]}
(686777) 2011 CU	2 February 2011	list^{[J]}
(686779) 2011 CH_{24}	1 February 2011	list^{[J]}
(686794) 2011 CG_{77}	3 February 2011	list^{[J]}
(686896) 2011 FB_{54}	28 March 2011	list^{[J]}
(687176) 2011 QQ_{102}	26 August 2011	list
(687464) 2011 UE_{304}	21 October 2011	list
(688382) 2012 TJ_{215}	11 October 2012	list
(689534) 2013 HL_{43}	31 October 2010	list^{[J]}
(689770) 2013 LU_{25}	5 May 2013	list
(689817) 2013 ON_{3}	24 January 2006	list
(691751) 2014 QS_{465}	24 August 2014	list
(692332) 2014 WR_{212}	30 March 2011	list^{[J]}
(692548) 2014 YN_{45}	1 October 2011	list
(692809) 2015 BM_{280}	9 November 2005	list
(692835) 2015 BX_{349}	28 October 2010	list^{[J]}
(694803) 2015 TU_{321}	25 December 2011	list
(695174) 2015 VS_{143}	3 January 2011	list^{[J]}
(696519) 2016 NK_{65}	30 August 2011	list
(696535) 2016 NJ_{76}	26 August 2011	list

(696711) 2016 QF_{12}	1 October 2011	list
(697733) 2017 FG_{171}	3 February 2011	list^{[J]}
(700556) 2002 PO_{203}	26 August 2011	list
(700850) 2003 SA_{129}	20 September 2003	list^{[F]}
(705303) 2008 YQ_{32}	30 December 2008	list
(705575) 2009 DU_{110}	21 December 2012	list^{[W]}
(706834) 2010 UN_{29}	28 October 2010	list^{[J]}
(706835) 2010 UW_{40}	29 October 2010	list^{[J]}
(706838) 2010 US_{47}	30 October 2010	list^{[J]}
(706857) 2010 UW_{110}	31 October 2010	list^{[J]}
(707004) 2011 AA_{6}	3 January 2011	list^{[J]}
(707090) 2011 BJ_{41}	30 January 2011	list^{[J]}
(707091) 2011 BS_{42}	30 January 2011	list^{[J]}
(707092) 2011 BZ_{42}	30 January 2011	list^{[J]}
(707095) 2011 BF_{48}	31 January 2011	list^{[J]}
(707096) 2011 BS_{48}	31 January 2011	list^{[J]}
(707418) 2011 FQ_{26}	30 March 2011	list^{[J]}
(707419) 2011 FS_{27}	30 March 2011	list^{[J]}
(707432) 2011 FG_{51}	30 March 2011	list^{[J]}
(707966) 2011 TJ_{4}	1 October 2011	list
(707967) 2011 TE_{5}	4 October 2011	list
(710135) 2013 PZ_{49}	2 August 2013	list
(710212) 2013 QP_{70}	31 August 2013	list
(710231) 2013 QW_{101}	31 August 2013	list
(710496) 2013 XG_{9}	31 October 2013	list

(711120) 2014 JL_{91}	4 October 2011	list
(712475) 2014 UK_{17}	30 January 2011	list^{[J]}
(712844) 2014 WC_{279}	30 March 2011	list^{[J]}
(713553) 2015 DH_{73}	21 June 2004	list
(714015) 2015 HN_{151}	1 February 2011	list^{[J]}
(714704) 2015 PU_{202}	21 October 2011	list
(714773) 2015 PO_{316}	31 August 2011	list
(715164) 2015 TJ_{220}	21 August 2006	list^{[J]}
(715463) 2015 VF_{120}	6 November 2015	list
(715795) 2015 XP_{345}	30 October 2010	list^{[J]}
(716037) 2016 AW_{120}	30 March 2011	list^{[J]}
(716926) 2016 GP_{223}	14 October 2006	list^{[J]}
(717827) 2017 BR_{35}	1 October 2011	list
(718292) 2017 FM_{32}	31 January 2011	list^{[J]}
(718350) 2017 FL_{66}	1 February 2011	list^{[J]}
(718652) 2017 PP_{46}	1 September 2013	list
(720761) 2002 NT_{83}	5 August 2013	list
(723363) 2006 UB_{4}	17 October 2006	list^{[A]}
(723850) 2007 RB_{9}	5 September 2007	list^{[A]}
(723854) 2007 RF_{19}	2 September 2007	list
(726023) 2009 RB_{1}	10 September 2009	list^{[J]}
(727531) 2010 HV_{57}	30 March 2011	list
728826 Szerbantal	30 September 2010	list^{[O]}
(728902) 2010 UR_{37}	29 October 2010	list^{[J]}
(729036) 2010 YW_{3}	30 December 2010	list^{[J]}

(729122) 2011 BA_{48}	31 January 2011	list^{[J]}
(729123) 2011 BP_{48}	31 January 2011	list^{[J]}
(729124) 2011 BY_{48}	31 January 2011	list^{[J]}
(729125) 2011 BU_{49}	31 January 2011	list^{[J]}
(729129) 2011 BQ_{65}	1 February 2011	list^{[J]}
(729221) 2011 CC_{1}	2 February 2011	list^{[J]}
(729259) 2011 CJ_{77}	3 February 2011	list^{[J]}
(729418) 2011 FM_{26}	30 March 2011	list^{[J]}
(729912) 2011 SH_{232}	30 September 2011	list
(730824) 2012 TH_{282}	11 October 2012	list
(731052) 2012 XK_{169}	9 December 2012	list
731716 Käszlaci	7 August 2013	list
(731749) 2013 QN_{70}	30 August 2013	list
(732191) 2013 YH_{155}	27 December 2013	list
732272 Langejans	18 October 2012	list^{[V]}
(732789) 2014 KX_{104}	4 October 2011	list
(733312) 2014 QF_{336}	25 August 2014	list
(734614) 2015 BT_{86}	4 December 2010	list^{[J]}
(734635) 2015 BP_{119}	5 September 2007	list^{[A]}
(734858) 2015 BV_{553}	28 September 2013	list
(738406) 2016 QR_{74}	5 October 2011	list
(738771) 2017 BE_{38}	23 January 2017	list
(739383) 2017 QT_{122}	28 September 2013	list
(741316) 2005 UW_{541}	28 September 2013	list
(741813) 2006 TK_{11}	15 October 2006	list^{[J]}

(742046) 2006 XP_{77}	14 February 2011	list
(742055) 2006 YT_{44}	25 December 2006	list
(742244) 2007 LZ	8 June 2007	list
(742826) 2007 YJ_{3}	17 December 2007	list
(743879) 2008 YX_{8}	23 December 2008	list
(743891) 2008 YT_{25}	27 December 2008	list
(743892) 2008 YU_{25}	27 December 2008	list
(744363) 2009 OJ_{9}	20 November 1998	list^{[A]}
(745074) 2010 RW_{40}	3 September 2010	list^{[J]}
(745199) 2010 UL_{39}	29 October 2010	list^{[J]}
(745208) 2010 UB_{69}	31 October 2010	list^{[J]}
(745216) 2010 UA_{107}	31 October 2010	list^{[J]}
(745232) 2010 VH_{28}	29 October 2010	list^{[O]}
(745243) 2010 VG_{76}	1 November 2010	list^{[J]}
(745411) 2011 BK_{44}	30 January 2011	list^{[O]}
(745493) 2011 CU_{24}	3 February 2011	list^{[J]}
(745541) 2011 CX_{128}	3 February 2011	list^{[J]}
(745873) 2011 MY_{11}	22 October 2012	list^{[W]}
(745971) 2011 QX_{34}	25 August 2011	list
(746083) 2011 SN_{106}	26 August 2011	list
(746136) 2011 SS_{261}	27 September 2011	list^{[R]}
(746191) 2011 TV_{2}	1 October 2011	list
(746223) 2011 UW_{31}	18 October 2011	list^{[N]}
(746243) 2011 UH_{94}	1 September 2007	list^{[A]}
(746331) 2011 UR_{285}	6 October 2011	list

(746339) 2011 UM_{302}	4 October 2011	list^{[O]}
(746380) 2011 UX_{400}	17 October 2011	list^{[N]}
(746438) 2011 VZ_{25}	7 November 2011	list^{[AB]}
(746463) 2011 WP_{29}	22 November 2011	list^{[T]}
(746750) 2012 EM_{17}	18 March 2012	list^{[N]}
(746753) 2012 EK_{20}	16 March 2012	list^{[O]}
(746753) 2012 FN_{80}	27 March 2012	list
(746792) 2012 FN_{80}	27 March 2012	list
(746955) 2012 KJ_{53}	19 May 2012	list^{[O]}
(747358) 2012 UP_{29}	17 October 2012	list^{[AC]}
(747386) 2012 US_{90}	21 October 2012	list^{[W]}
(747433) 2012 UV_{186}	21 October 2012	list^{[W]}
(747448) 2012 UJ_{193}	20 October 2012	list^{[U]}
(747453) 2012 UF_{200}	20 October 2012	list^{[U]}
(747667) 2012 XD_{146}	9 December 2012	list
(747739) 2013 AA_{33}	13 December 2012	list
(747748) 2013 AG_{49}	7 January 2013	list
(747838) 2013 BQ_{25}	1 October 2011	list
(748214) 2013 JW_{6}	18 October 2011	list^{[N]}
(748542) 2013 SO_{52}	28 September 2013	list
(748623) 2013 TJ_{103}	28 September 2013	list
(748805) 2013 XF_{5}	3 December 2013	list^{[Y]}
(749541) 2014 LE_{27}	4 June 2014	list^{[O]}
(752032) 2015 KP_{152}	18 October 2012	list^{[W]}
(752128) 2015 MP_{61}	30 August 2011	list^{[O]}

(752753) 2015 TU_{46}	4 October 2011	list^{[O]}
(754826) 2016 UR_{68}	25 October 2012	list^{[AC]}
(755806) 2017 RH_{29}	2 September 2007	list^{[A]}
(755987) 2017 XQ_{25}	16 October 2017	list
(756915) 2021 FW_{36}	11 October 2012	list
(757273) 2002 NA_{84}	30 August 2011	list^{[O]}
(761974) 2010 UP_{40}	29 October 2010	list^{[O]}
(761978) 2010 UW_{6}	30 October 2010	list^{[J]}
(761982) 2010 US_{60}	29 October 2010	list^{[J]}
(762016) 2010 VR_{45}	1 November 2010	list^{[J]}
(762291) 2011 BC_{41}	30 January 2011	list^{[J]}
(762293) 2011 BX_{41}	30 January 2011	list^{[J]}
(762294) 2011 BC_{44}	30 January 2011	list^{[J]}
(762296) 2011 BL_{46}	30 January 2011	list^{[J]}
(762297) 2011 BV_{47}	31 January 2011	list^{[J]}
(762298) 2011 BH_{49}	31 January 2011	list^{[J]}
(762302) 2011 BG_{66}	31 January 2011	list^{[J]}
(762532) 2011 FR_{26}	30 March 2011	list^{[J]}
(762533) 2011 FD_{27}	30 March 2011	list^{[J]}
(762853) 2011 QK_{8}	26 August 2011	list^{[J]}
(763002) 2011 TH_{4}	1 October 2011	list^{[J]}
(763104) 2011 UU_{339}	18 October 2011	list^{[N]}
(763386) 2012 BU_{104}	1 January 2012	list^{[N]}
(764187) 2012 UW_{207}	23 October 2012	list^{[U]}
(764194) 2012 UW_{210}	20 October 2012	list^{[U]}

(764239) 2012 UC_{248}	20 October 2012	list^{[U]}
(765021) 2013 RA_{40}	3 September 2013	list^{[J]}
(767273) 2014 SQ_{398}	29 September 2014	list^{[Y]}
(770051) 2015 VY_{16}	4 December 2010	list^{[J]}
(771097) 2016 EC_{102}	24 March 2011	list^{[J]}
(772209) 2017 FJ_{51}	30 January 2011	list^{[J]}
(776374) 2007 VR_{352}	22 March 2014	list^{[V]}
(778386) 2010 JV_{213}	20 October 2012	list^{[U]}
(778456) 2010 RR_{42}	3 September 2010	list^{[J]}
(778459) 2010 RU_{45}	3 September 2010	list^{[J]}
(778483) 2010 RJ_{197}	6 September 2010	list^{[J]}
(778548) 2010 TY_{58}	7 October 2010	list^{[J]}
(778851) 2011 AZ_{5}	30 December 2010	list^{[J]}
(778905) 2011 BG_{41}	30 January 2011	list^{[J]}
(778906) 2011 BZ_{49}	31 January 2011	list^{[J]}
(779086) 2011 EP_{17}	6 March 2011	list^{[P]}
(779347) 2011 SA_{20}	30 August 2011	list^{[O]}
(779497) 2011 TX_{18}	4 October 2011	list^{[O]}
(779500) 2011 TY_{21}	3 October 2011	list^{[O]}
(779713) 2011 WV_{30}	22 November 2011	list^{[T]}
(780598) 2012 UE_{173}	25 October 2012	list^{[AC]}
(781794) 2013 SV_{108}	27 September 2013	list^{[X]}
(782997) 2014 OH_{17}	6 September 2010	list^{[J]}
(787373) 2016 EC_{66}	3 February 2011	list^{[J]}
(788467) 2017 BT_{11}	24 January 2017	list

(789847) 2017 VO_{9}	17 October 2017	list
(792647) 2021 RJ_{54}	6 October 2010	list^{[J]}
(796898) 2010 UK_{40}	29 October 2010	list^{[O]}
(796902) 2010 UW_{68}	31 October 2010	list^{[J]}
(796903) 2010 UD_{69}	31 October 2010	list^{[J]}
(796972) 2010 VJ_{134}	30 October 2010	list^{[J]}
(797097) 2010 YY_{2}	30 December 2010	list^{[J]}
(797160) 2011 BD_{44}	30 January 2011	list^{[J]}
(797242) 2011 CJ_{24}	1 February 2011	list^{[J]}
(797259) 2011 CK_{77}	3 February 2011	list^{[J]}
(797381) 2011 FL_{5}	24 March 2011	list^{[J]}
(797386) 2011 FT_{25}	29 March 2011	list^{[J]}
(798872) 2012 YN_{25}	21 December 2012	list^{[W]}
(799591) 2013 QS_{101}	17 August 2013	list^{[X]}
(804640) 2016 AQ_{239}	18 March 2012	list^{[N]}
808811 Tarczaygyörgy	2018 10 05	list^{[AD]}
(809529) 2019 ON_{50}	31 August 2011	list^{[O]}
(815719) 2010 RS_{42}	3 September 2010	list^{[J]}
(815758) 2010 RT_{178}	7 September 2010	list^{[J]}
(815864) 2010 UX_{63}	30 October 2010	list^{[J]}
(816210) 2011 CJ_{134}	3 February 2011	list^{[J]}
(816259) 2011 EV_{28}	7 March 2011	list^{[P]}
(816301) 2011 FN_{25}	29 March 2011	list^{[J]}
(816302) 2011 FV_{25}	29 March 2011	list^{[J]}
(816303) 2011 FS_{26}	30 March 2011	list^{[J]}

(816304) 2011 FA_{27}	30 March 2011	list^{[J]}
(816960) 2011 WY_{31}	23 November 2011	list^{[T]}
(817195) 2012 FA_{106}	16 March 2012	list^{[O]}
(817841) 2012 VW_{39}	18 October 2012	list^{[W]}
(817906) 2012 XU_{51}	25 October 2012	list^{[AC]}
(820245) 2014 QN_{457}	30 October 2010	list^{[J]}
(820429) 2014 TK_{18}	11 October 2010	list^{[S]}
(821165) 2015 DY_{50}	24 March 2011	list^{[J]}
(821382) 2015 FO_{194}	11 October 2010	list^{[S]}
(822152) 2015 PY_{68}	4 October 2011	list^{[O]}
(822341) 2015 RL_{91}	9 August 2015	list^{[Z]}
(823076) 2016 AV_{1}	17 October 2011	list^{[N]}
(825109) 2017 SM_{172}	30 August 2011	list^{[O]}
(828716) 2005 GE	1 April 2005	list
(834715) 2010 TU_{38}	7 September 2010	list^{[J]}
(834796) 2010 UD_{38}	29 October 2010	list^{[O]}
(834807) 2010 UB_{64}	31 October 2010	list^{[O]}
(834810) 2010 UG_{69}	31 October 2010	list^{[J]}
(835003) 2010 YT_{2}	30 December 2010	list^{[J]}
(835055) 2011 BO_{49}	31 January 2011	list^{[J]}
(835074) 2011 BL_{99}	30 January 2011	list^{[J]}
(835276) 2011 FO_{26}	30 March 2011	list^{[J]}
(835743) 2011 UM_{171}	29 September 2011	list
(835744) 2011 UR_{172}	21 October 2011	list
(835836) 2011 UP_{437}	2 October 2011	list

(836195) 2012 FA_{96}	16 March 2012	list
(836252) 2012 HU_{82}	18 March 2012	list^{[N]}
(836638) 2012 TF_{254}	11 October 2012	list^{[AC]}
(836675) 2012 TW_{338}	11 October 2012	list
(836738) 2012 UF_{27}	17 October 2012	list
(836754) 2012 UJ_{68}	21 October 2012	list^{[W]}
(836773) 2012 UK_{98}	6 October 2012	list^{[V]}
(837625) 2013 RD_{71}	31 August 2013	list^{[O]}
(837837) 2013 UN_{23}	31 October 2013	list
(844423) 2016 WZ_{64}	23 November 2016	list^{[AE]}
(844510) 2017 BP_{9}	21 December 2016	list^{[AF]}
(844667) 2017 DT_{76}	31 January 2011	list^{[J]}
(844871) 2017 OO_{33}	6 August 2013	list
(846018) 2018 VB_{58}	25 December 2011	list^{[O]}
(849565) 2006 BM_{26}	24 January 2006	list
(850165) 2006 UQ_{3}	17 October 2006	list^{[J]}
(852677) 2008 UQ_{95}	25 October 2008	list^{[L]}
(853463) 2009 HN_{36}	19 April 2009	list
(854582) 2010 RA_{41}	3 September 2010	list^{[J]}
(854585) 2010 RZ_{42}	3 September 2010	list^{[J]}
(854595) 2010 RS_{69}	6 September 2010	list^{[J]}
(854646) 2010 RR_{164}	6 September 2010	list^{[J]}
(854905) 2010 UQ_{37}	29 October 2010	list^{[O]}
(854906) 2010 US_{40}	29 October 2010	list^{[O]}
(854907) 2010 UB_{47}	30 October 2010	list^{[J]}

(854908) 2010 UM_{47}	30 October 2010	list^{[J]}
(854915) 2010 UP_{68}	31 October 2010	list^{[J]}
(854937) 2010 UV_{120}	30 October 2010	list^{[J]}
(855155) 2010 XT_{105}	4 September 2013	list
(855162) 2010 XZ_{111}	4 December 2010	list^{[J]}
(855174) 2010 YK_{2}	30 December 2010	list^{[J]}
(855176) 2010 YY_{3}	30 December 2010	list^{[J]}
(855265) 2011 BY_{41}	30 January 2011	list^{[J]}
(855469) 2011 CX_{135}	3 February 2011	list^{[J]}
(855525) 2011 ET_{29}	7 March 2011	list^{[P]}
(855605) 2011 FQ_{37}	30 March 2011	list^{[J]}
(855608) 2011 FH_{51}	30 March 2011	list^{[J]}
(856037) 2011 QE_{104}	30 August 2011	list
(856059) 2011 QA_{114}	31 August 2011	list
(856274) 2011 SF_{222}	26 August 2011	list
(856447) 2011 TY_{16}	5 October 2011	list
(856450) 2011 TA_{19}	4 October 2011	list^{[O]}
(856451) 2011 TD_{19}	4 October 2011	list^{[O]}
(856454) 2011 TV_{20}	4 October 2011	list^{[O]}
(856477) 2011 UQ_{39}	5 October 2011	list
(856512) 2011 UR_{117}	17 October 2011	list^{[N]}
(856548) 2011 UD_{204}	5 September 2007	list^{[A]}
(856802) 2011 WG_{41}	24 November 2011	list^{[AG]}
(857237) 2012 FS_{80}	20 March 2012	list^{[AH]}
(857461) 2012 LR_{12}	15 June 2012	list

(857462) 2012 LS_{12}	15 June 2012	list
(857901) 2012 TG_{254}	11 October 2012	list
(858631) 2013 AC_{85}	31 August 2007	list^{[A]}
(859065) 2013 GM_{84}	11 April 2013	list
(859344) 2013 LJ_{26}	7 June 2013	list
(859593) 2013 PC_{112}	2 August 2013	list
(859806) 2013 RV_{185}	4 September 2013	list
(859856) 2013 SS_{108}	28 September 2013	list
(860026) 2013 UX_{24}	31 October 2013	list
(864146) 2014 WK_{424}	2 February 2011	list^{[J]}
(865894) 2015 NX_{9}	27 August 2011	list
(866799) 2015 TN_{211}	6 September 2010	list^{[J]}
(867134) 2015 VU_{90}	1 November 2010	list^{[J]}
(869253) 2016 PL_{15}	25 August 2011	list
(869281) 2016 PE_{75}	9 December 2012	list
(870609) 2017 BO_{211}	21 January 2017	list^{[O]}
(871676) 2017 TM_{12}	4 December 2013	list^{[Y]}
(871718) 2017 UG_{55}	18 October 2017	list
(872826) 2018 VF_{68}	9 November 2005	list
(877735) 2010 YX_{3}	30 December 2010	list^{[J]}
(877736) 2011 AE_{6}	3 January 2011	list^{[J]}
(877754) 2011 BM_{49}	31 January 2011	list^{[J]}
(877755) 2011 BO_{50}	31 January 2011	list^{[J]}
(877961) 2011 QO_{87}	26 August 2011	list
(878108) 2011 TH_{20}	4 October 2011	list

(878175) 2011 UL_{329}	5 October 2011	list
(878191) 2011 UH_{407}	2 October 2011	list
(878575) 2012 TZ_{253}	11 October 2012	list
(878576) 2012 TN_{254}	11 October 2012	list
(878585) 2012 TD_{289}	6 October 2012	list
(878605) 2012 TB_{350}	11 October 2012	list
(880104) 2014 QP_{378}	30 October 2010	list^{[J]}
(881009) 2015 BU_{348}	2 February 2011	list^{[J]}
(881236) 2015 FJ_{1}	13 February 2015	list
(881700) 2015 OG_{44}	3 October 2011	list
(882645) 2016 CW_{134}	3 February 2011	list^{[J]}
(883595) 2016 TY_{28}	21 December 2012	list^{[W]}
(884053) 2017 AZ	2 October 2011	list
(884687) 2017 UV_{9}	19 October 2017	list
(884728) 2017 UP_{70}	31 October 2013	list
(885214) 2018 PJ_{12}	5 September 2013	list
(886985) 2022 UY_{21}	29 October 2022	list
