= HD 181068 =

Star system in the constellation Lyra

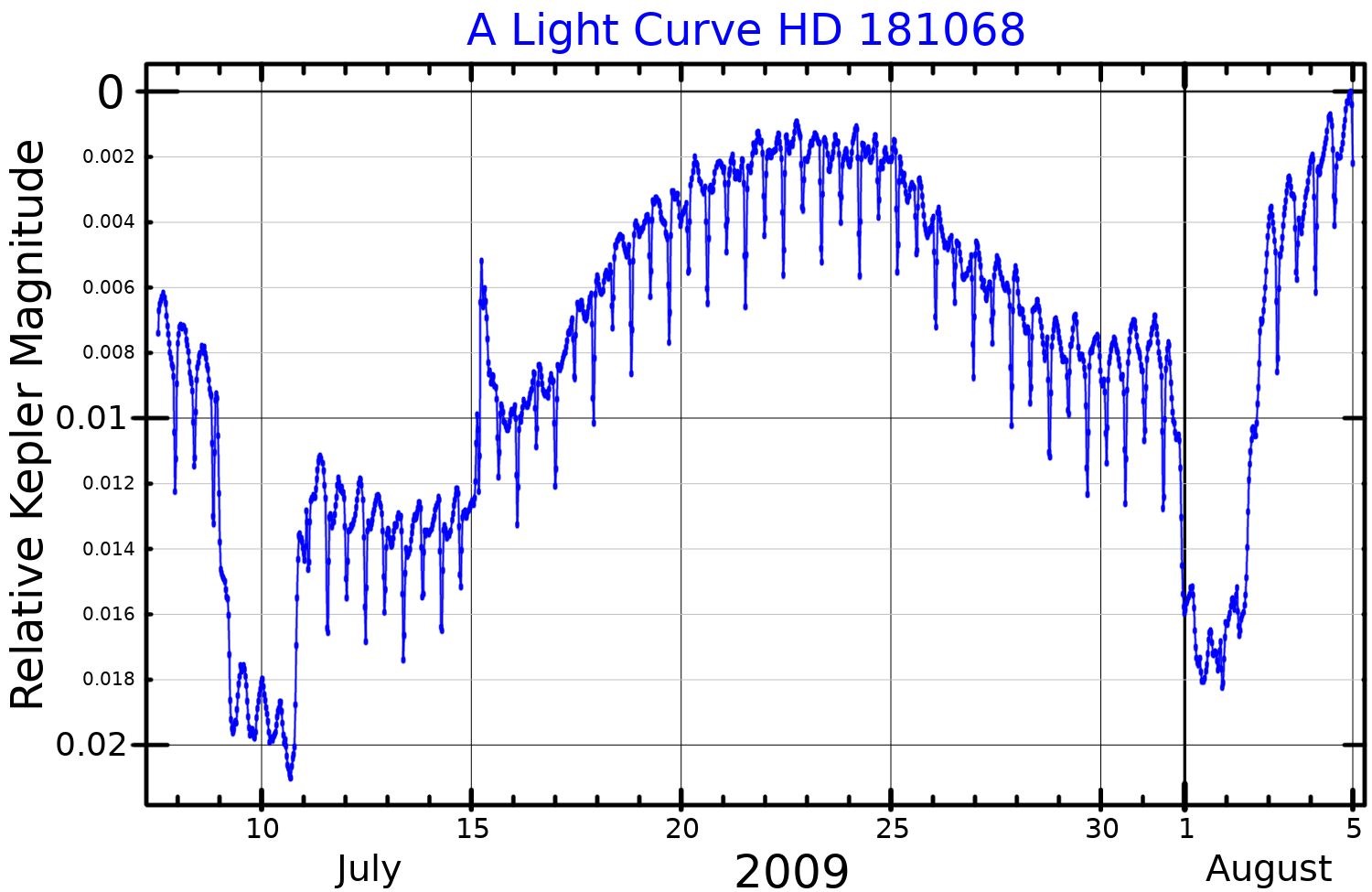
- A light curve for HD 181068, adapted from Derekas et al. (2011)

Observation data Epoch J2000 Equinox ICRS
- Constellation: Lyra
- Right ascension: 19^{h} 17^{m} 08.97867^{s}
- Declination: +41° 15′ 53.3144″
- Apparent magnitude (V): 7.09

Characteristics
- Spectral type: G8III / G8V / K1V
- Variable type: Eclipsing binary

Astrometry
Radial velocity (R_{v})	+2.90±11.04 km/s
Proper motion (μ)	RA: +1.366 mas/yr Dec.: −8.376 mas/yr
Parallax (π)	4.2065±0.0322 mas
Distance	775 ± 6 ly (238 ± 2 pc)
Absolute magnitude (M_{V})	–0.3 / 5.6 / 6.1

Orbit
Primary	HD 181068 A
Name	HD 181068 B
Period (P)	45.4711±0.0002 d
Semi-major axis (a)	90.31±0.72 R_{☉}
Eccentricity (e)	0
Inclination (i)	87.5±2°
Periastron epoch (T)	T_{min} = 2455499.9962

Orbit
Primary	HD 181068 Ba
Name	HD 181068 Bb
Period (P)	0.9056768±0.0000002 d
Semi-major axis (a)	4.777±0.039 R_{☉}
Eccentricity (e)	0
Inclination (i)	87.6±1.4°
Periastron epoch (T)	T_{min} = 2455051.23623

Details

HD 181068 A
Mass	3±0.1 M_{☉}
Radius	12.46±0.15 R_{☉}
Luminosity	92.8±7.6 L_{☉}
Surface gravity (log g)	2.73 cgs
Temperature	5,100±100 K

HD 181068 Ba
Mass	0.915±0.034 M_{☉}
Radius	0.865±0.01 R_{☉}
Luminosity	0.447±0.037 L_{☉}
Surface gravity (log g)	4.53 cgs
Temperature	5,100±100 K

HD 181068 Bb
Mass	0.870±0.043 M_{☉}
Radius	0.8±0.02 R_{☉}
Luminosity	0.27±0.027 L_{☉}
Surface gravity (log g)	4.58 cgs
Temperature	4,675±100 K

Other designations
- HD 181068, BD+41°3292, HIP 94780, SAO 48282, KIC 5952403

Database references
SIMBAD	data
KIC	data

HD 181068 is a star system in the constellation of Lyra. With an apparent magnitude of 7.09, the system is not visible to the naked eye but may be viewed with a pair of binoculars. Based on parallax measurements made by the Gaia spacecraft, the system is some 775 light years (238 parsecs) away from Earth.

HD 181068 is in the Kepler spacecraft's field of view, and its unique properties were first observed by the satellite's photometer. It consists of a red giant, designated HD 181068 A, along with two main-sequence stars, designated HD 181068 Ba and HD 181068 Bb, respectively. Normal eclipsing binaries have two components that pass in front of each other while eclipsing. However, all three components of HD 181068 orbit each other in such a way that they eclipse each other, forming a rare triply eclipsing system.

The primary, HD 181068 A, has a spectral type of G8III, meaning it is a red giant that has used up its core hydrogen and has expanded to a radius of 12.46 R_{☉}. The primary star is also unusual in that it does not exhibit internal seismic oscillations as have been detected in other red giants, although tidal forces from the closer pair may possibly be causing other variability in the light curve of the system.

HD 181068 Ba and Bb have spectral types of G8V and K1V respectively, indicating their location on the main sequence, slightly later than the Sun. They are in a close orbit and complete an orbit once every 0.906 days (about 21.7 hours), while they orbit HD 181068 A every 45.5 days. All three stars have similar surface brightnesses and colors, so when the two companions eclipse the red giant, the change in brightness is very slight and hard to detect.

== See also ==
- HD 188753, a triple star system with a possible exoplanet companion
