= Kulionys =

- Village
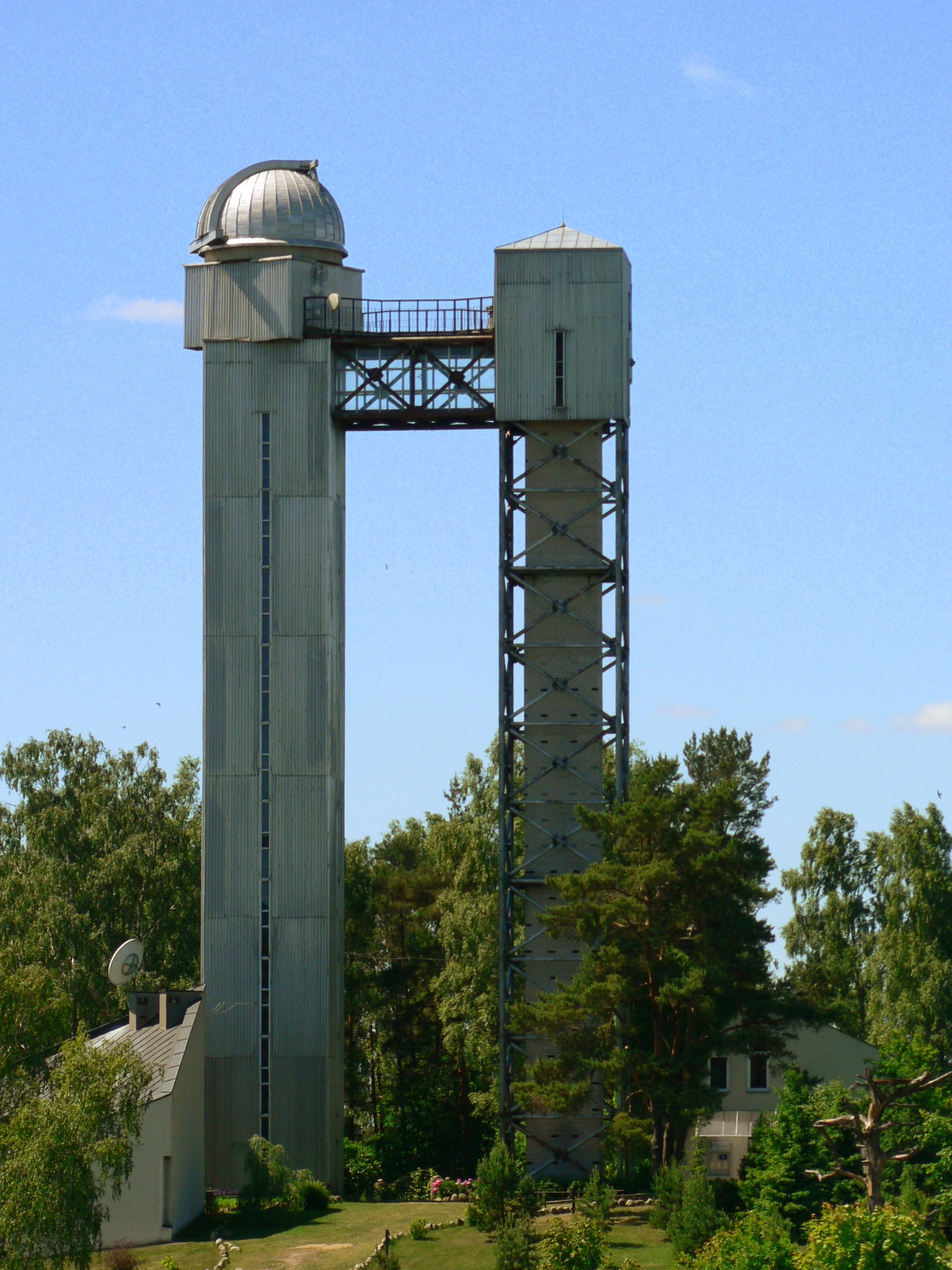
- Lithuania Kulionys observatory

- Location in Lithuania
- Coordinates: 55°19′N 25°34′E
- Country: Lithuania
- County: Utena County
- Municipality: Molėtai District Municipality
- Eldership: Čiulėnai eldership

Population (2011)
  - Total: 34
- Time zone: UTC+2 (EET)
  - Summer (DST): UTC+3 (EEST)

Kulionys is a village in Lithuania (Molėtai district municipality), near Molėtai, mostly famous for its Molėtai Astronomical Observatory and Lithuanian Museum of Ethnocosmology. According to the 2011 census, the town has a population of 34 people.
