= Aliz Derekas =

Hungarian astronomer

Aliz Derekas (born 1977) is a Hungarian astronomer, and a senior research fellow at the Gothard Astrophysical Observatory of Eötvös Loránd University. Her research interests include variable stars, double stars, and exoplanets. Her research has included leading a team that discovered the structure of HD 181068, an unusual triple system of mutually eclipsing stars, and the observation of convection within V1154 Cyg, a Cepheid variable star.

Derekas completed a Ph.D. in 2009 at the University of Sydney in Australia. Her dissertation, Pulsating Stars and Binary Systems, was jointly supervised by Tim Bedding and László Kiss.
