= Molėtai Astronomical Observatory =

Observatory in Lithuania

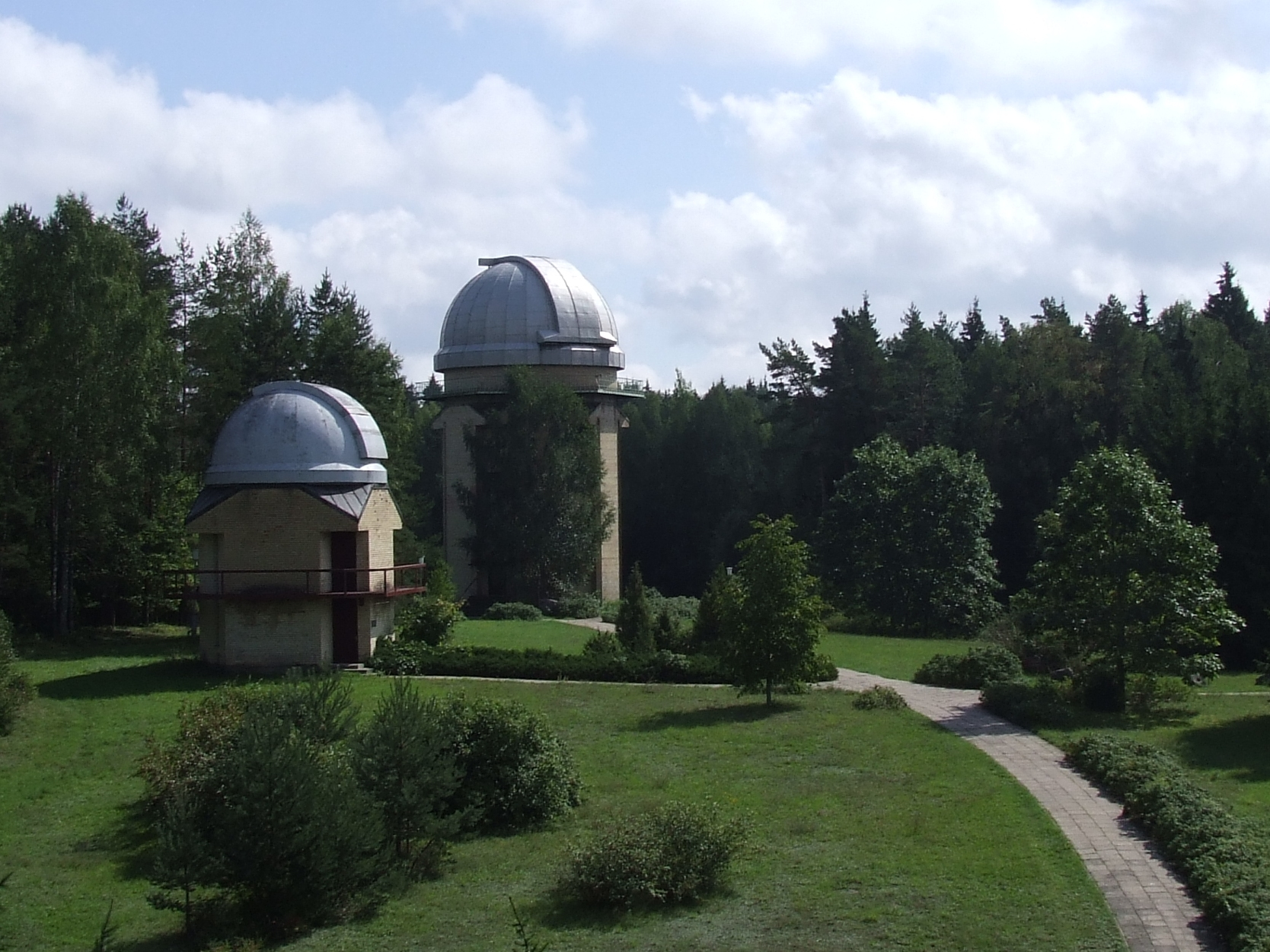
- Organization: Vilnius University Institute of Theoretical Physics and Astronomy
- Observatory code: 152
- Location: Kulionys, Lithuania
- Coordinates: 55°18′57.5″N 25°33′48″E
- Altitude: 200 m (660 ft)
- Established: 1969
- Website: mao.tfai.vu.lt

Telescopes
- Ritchey–Chrétien: 165 cm reflector
- Cassegrain: 63 cm reflector
- Maksutov: 35 cm reflector
- Related media on Commons

The Molėtai Astronomical Observatory (MAO; Molėtų astronomijos observatorija in Lithuanian) is an astronomical observatory owned and operated by Vilnius University Institute of Theoretical Physics and Astronomy. It is located on the Kaldiniai Hill next to Kulionys, Lithuania, 10 km from the town of Molėtai.

== History ==
The old astronomical observatory of Vilnius University, opened in 1753, and the new University observatory near Vingis Park, built in 1921, gradually appeared inside the city of Vilnius where conditions turned out to be unsatisfactory for astronomical observations. In 1969, a new observatory was started in the Molėtai district, about 70 km north of Vilnius. It is built on the Kaldiniai Hill just near the small village of Kulionys, about 10 km from the town of Molėtai. In the fall of 1969, the first 25 cm diameter telescope of the Molėtai Astronomical Observatory (MAO) was mounted. Later on, it was placed to the 35/51 cm Maksutov telescope. In 1974 and 1991, the reflecting telescopes of 63 cm and 165 cm diameters were put into operation.

== Equipment ==
MAO currently has three research telescopes:

- 35 cm Maksutov telescope (f/3.5), which replaced MAO's first 25 cm telescope in 1975,
- 63 cm Cassegrain telescope,
- 165 cm Ritchey–Chrétien telescope, which MAO claims is the largest in Northern Europe (excluding Britain).

== See also ==
- Lithuanian Museum of Ethnocosmology
- List of largest optical reflecting telescopes
