= Tim Bedding =

Australian astrophysicist and researcher

- Born: 21 July 1966 (age 59); England, UK
- Occupation: Astrophysicist
- Scientific career
- Doctoral students: Aliz Derekas

Timothy R. Bedding FAA (born 21 July 1966) is an Australian astronomer known for his work on asteroseismology, the study of stellar oscillations. In particular, he contributed to the first detections of solar-like oscillations in stars such as eta Bootis, beta Hydri and alpha Centauri. He also led the discovery, using data from the Kepler space telescope, that red giants oscillate in mixed modes that are directly sensitive to the core properties of the star and can be used to distinguish red giants burning helium in their cores from those that are still only burning hydrogen in a shell.

Bedding has worked in the School of Physics at the University of Sydney since 1995 and was Head of School from 2012 to 2018. He received the University's Excellence in Teaching Award in 1999 and was appointed as a Payne Scott Professor in 2019.

The asteroid 231470 Bedding is named after him.

He played on the Australian team in the 1990 Ultimate Frisbee World Championships in Oslo, Norway.

In May 2020 Bedding was elected Fellow of the Australian Academy of Science. In 2022, he was awarded an ARC Laureate Fellowship to use asteroseismology to measure the ages of stars.

== See also ==
- Asteroseismology
- Helioseismology
- Variable stars
- Procyon
