= Lithuanian Museum of Ethnocosmology =

- Lietuvos Etnokosmologijos muziejus

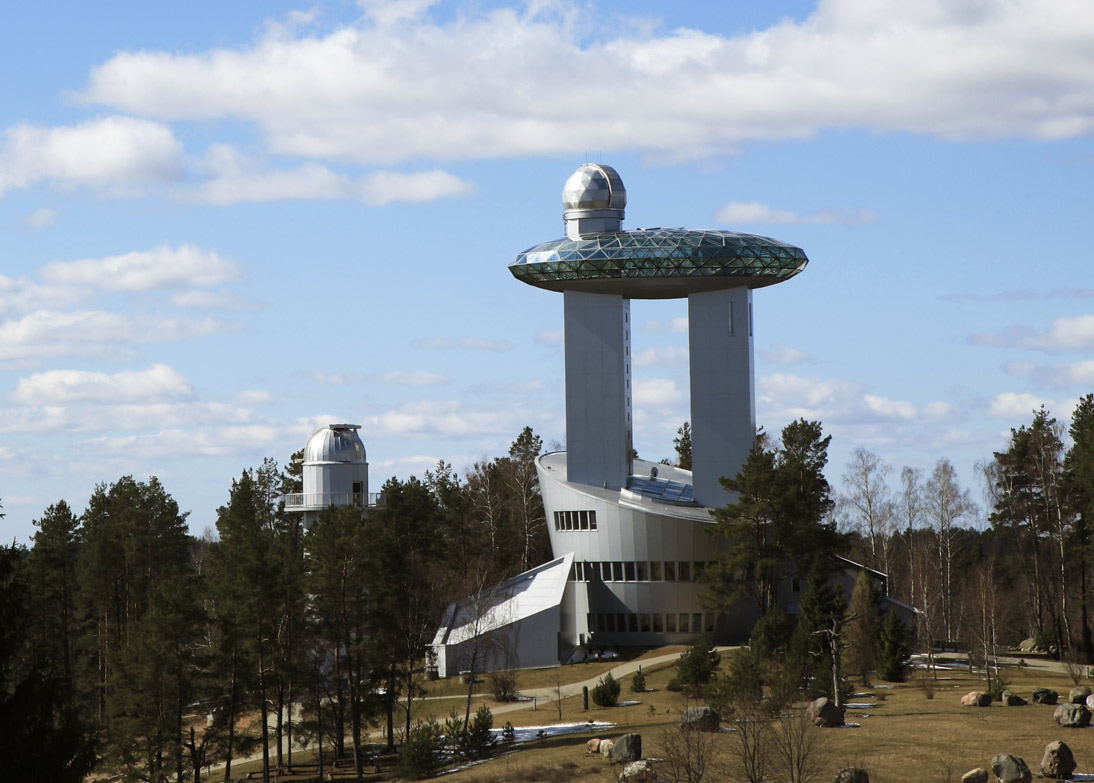
- Observatory tower of Lithuanian Museum of Ethnocosmology in Kulionys, Lithuania
- Established: 15 March 1990
- Location: Kulionys, Molėtai District Municipality, Lithuania
- Coordinates: 55.31539°N 25.55506°E
- Type: Ethnocosmology museum
- Director: Linas Šmigelskas
- Website: etnokosmomuziejus.lt

The Lithuanian Museum of Ethnocosmology (Lithuanian: Lietuvos etnokosmologijos muziejus) is a sky observatory and ethnocosmology museum in Kulionys village located about 70 km (43 mi) north of Vilnius, Lithuania. It is the first museum of such kind in the world. It was established in 1990 next to the Molėtai Astronomical Observatory.

== History of the museum ==
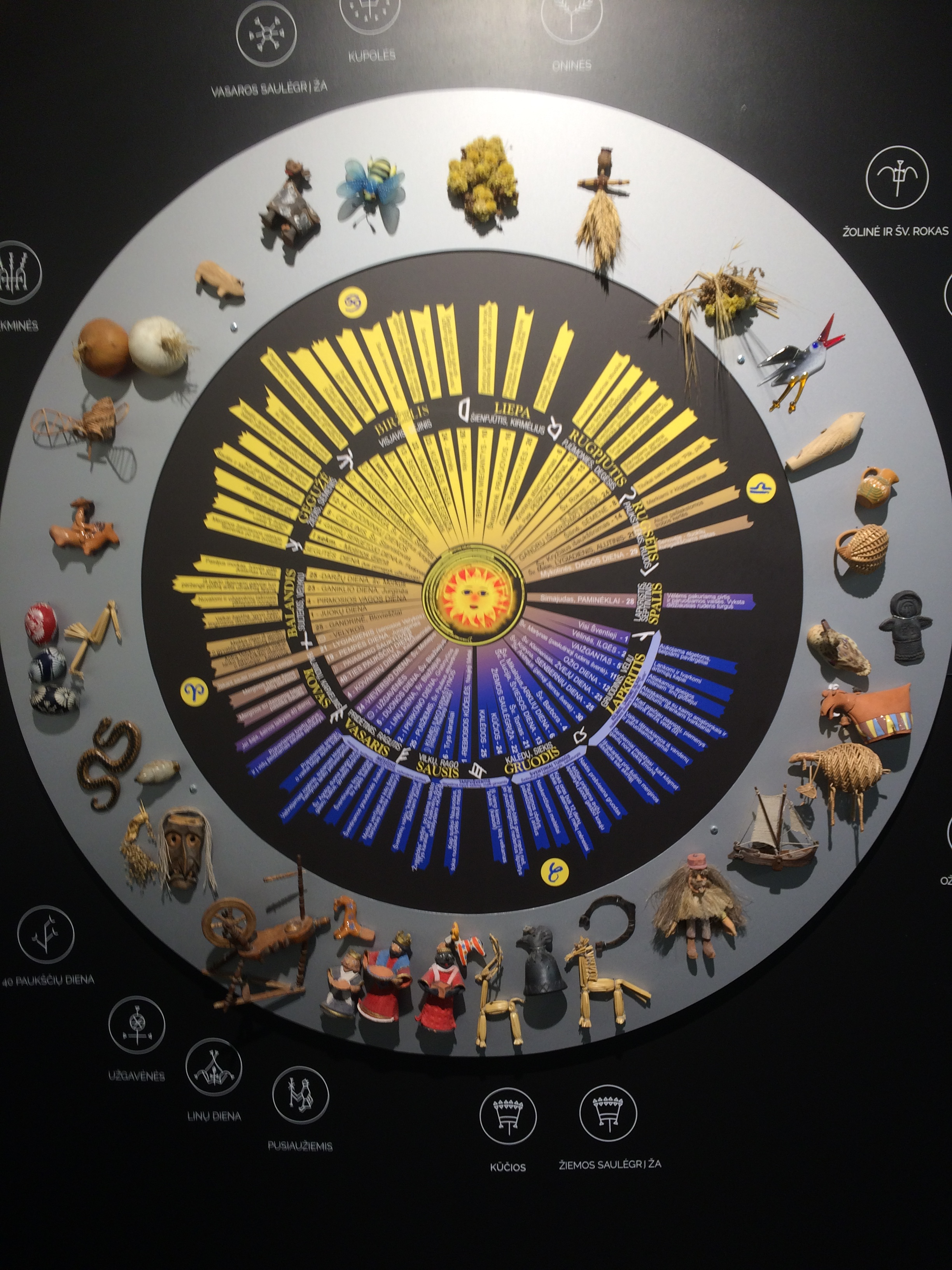
Lithuanian National Cosmological Calendar

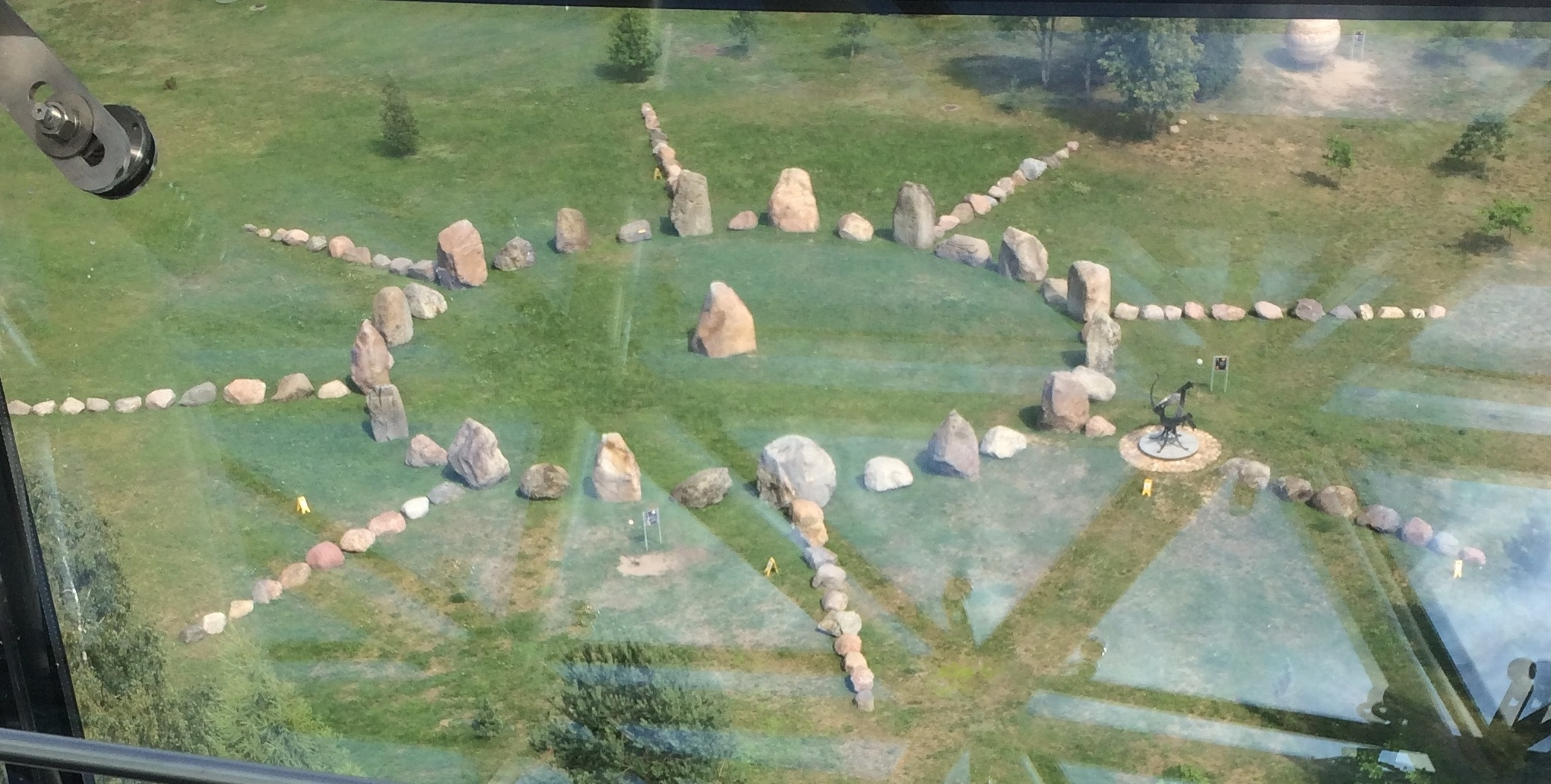
Stone installation of the model of the Solar System (view from the observation platform

The museum was opened in 1990. The buildings of the museum are built a few hundred meters from the main observatory of Lithuania.

In honor of the 125th anniversary of the Vilnius University Astronomical Observatory (1978), a museum was opened on one of the floors of the telescope tower of the Molėtai Astronomical Observatory, its fund, in addition to the astronomical exhibits (telescopes from the old Vilnius Observatory), included the first ethnographic exhibits.

Since for the present embodiment of the ethnocosmological idea other spaces, premises and special buildings were required on a separate hill located several hundred meters from the main observatory, the so-called special astronomical pavilion (1989) was erected. Together with the museum buildings, the concept and concept of ethnocosmology was born - the model of the cosmic world created by the ancient Lithuanian people, the system of communication with it and respect for it. Decision of the Presidium of the Lithuanian Academy of Sciences on 15 March 1990 was founded Ethnocosmological Museum.

In the building of the museum's observatory, the dome was erected and a telescope was installed (1997).

After transfer to the balance of the museum of land and buildings (2003), the implementation of the architectural idea and the project of the museum was begun. Construction work began. Reconstruction of the museum's buildings took two years (2007-2008). The second telescope with a diameter of 80 cm was installed in the museum's observatory (2008).

== Exposition of the museum ==
In the architecture of the complex of buildings of the museum the image of the cosmic, world tree is reflected. In the roots of the tree - in the underground gallery rising up the hill - there is an exposition, and on the top of the hill there is a telescope crowning the tower-tree, looking to the sky.

The exposition of the museum includes almost everything that is related to cosmology: from ancient meteorological instruments, astronomical and astrological calendars to musical works and works of fine art connected with cosmology. Excursions begin with an inspection of the underground rooms, where the main exposition is located and ends at the viewing platform of the 45-meter-high tower, where you can see the large-scale installations on the museum territory, as well as the landscapes of the lake area.
