= List of minor planets: 723001–724000 =

The following is a partial list of minor planets, running from minor-planet number 723001 through 724000, inclusive. The primary data for this and other partial lists is based on JPL's "Small-Body Orbital Elements" and data available from the Minor Planet Center. Critical list information is also provided by the MPC, unless otherwise specified from Lowell Observatory. A detailed description of the table's columns and additional sources are given on the main page including a complete list of every page in this series, and a statistical break-up on the dynamical classification of minor planets.

Also see the summary list of all named bodies in numerical and alphabetical order, and the corresponding naming citations for the number range of this particular list. New namings may only be added to this list after official publication, as the preannouncement of names is condemned by the Working Group for Small Bodies Nomenclature of the International Astronomical Union.

| Near-Earth obj. | MBA (inner) | MBA (outer) | Centaur |
| Mars-crosser | MBA (middle) | Jupiter trojan | Trans-Neptunian obj. |
| Unclassified |

== 723001–723100 ==
| Designation | | | Discovery | | | Properties | | Ref |
| Permanent | Provisional | Named after | Date | Site | Discoverer(s) | Category | Diam. | Ref |
|---|---|---|---|---|---|---|---|---|
| 723001 | 2006 HT_{159} | — | April 30, 2006 | Kitt Peak | Spacewatch | · | 2.3 km | MPC · JPL |
| 723002 | 2006 JF_{8} | — | April 2, 2006 | Kitt Peak | Spacewatch | HOF | 2.4 km | MPC · JPL |
| 723003 | 2006 JJ_{10} | — | May 1, 2006 | Kitt Peak | Spacewatch | · | 670 m | MPC · JPL |
| 723004 | 2006 JB_{11} | — | May 1, 2006 | Kitt Peak | Spacewatch | · | 1.1 km | MPC · JPL |
| 723005 | 2006 JD_{13} | — | May 1, 2006 | Kitt Peak | Spacewatch | · | 3.3 km | MPC · JPL |
| 723006 | 2006 JZ_{14} | — | May 2, 2006 | Mount Lemmon | Mount Lemmon Survey | · | 3.1 km | MPC · JPL |
| 723007 | 2006 JU_{22} | — | May 3, 2006 | Mount Lemmon | Mount Lemmon Survey | · | 2.7 km | MPC · JPL |
| 723008 | 2006 JL_{31} | — | September 16, 2003 | Kitt Peak | Spacewatch | · | 2.0 km | MPC · JPL |
| 723009 | 2006 JG_{32} | — | May 3, 2006 | Kitt Peak | Spacewatch | HYG | 2.1 km | MPC · JPL |
| 723010 | 2006 JD_{48} | — | September 21, 2003 | Palomar | NEAT | · | 910 m | MPC · JPL |
| 723011 | 2006 JU_{49} | — | May 1, 2006 | Kitt Peak | Spacewatch | URS | 3.2 km | MPC · JPL |
| 723012 | 2006 JC_{60} | — | May 4, 2006 | Kitt Peak | Spacewatch | · | 1.7 km | MPC · JPL |
| 723013 | 2006 JP_{61} | — | May 1, 2006 | Mauna Kea | P. A. Wiegert | · | 3.0 km | MPC · JPL |
| 723014 | 2006 JV_{64} | — | January 30, 2006 | Kitt Peak | Spacewatch | · | 1.6 km | MPC · JPL |
| 723015 | 2006 JN_{77} | — | April 9, 2006 | Kitt Peak | Spacewatch | · | 1.2 km | MPC · JPL |
| 723016 | 2006 JH_{78} | — | May 1, 2006 | Mauna Kea | P. A. Wiegert | · | 2.8 km | MPC · JPL |
| 723017 | 2006 JR_{82} | — | May 6, 2006 | Mount Lemmon | Mount Lemmon Survey | · | 2.4 km | MPC · JPL |
| 723018 | 2006 JW_{82} | — | November 19, 2009 | Mount Lemmon | Mount Lemmon Survey | · | 3.2 km | MPC · JPL |
| 723019 | 2006 JE_{83} | — | May 6, 2006 | Mount Lemmon | Mount Lemmon Survey | · | 2.2 km | MPC · JPL |
| 723020 | 2006 JK_{84} | — | May 8, 2006 | Kitt Peak | Spacewatch | · | 1.1 km | MPC · JPL |
| 723021 | 2006 JX_{84} | — | May 7, 2006 | Mount Lemmon | Mount Lemmon Survey | · | 2.4 km | MPC · JPL |
| 723022 | 2006 JB_{85} | — | January 3, 2012 | Kitt Peak | Spacewatch | · | 520 m | MPC · JPL |
| 723023 | 2006 JH_{85} | — | May 2, 2006 | Mount Lemmon | Mount Lemmon Survey | THM | 1.9 km | MPC · JPL |
| 723024 | 2006 JJ_{85} | — | August 10, 2007 | Kitt Peak | Spacewatch | · | 1.1 km | MPC · JPL |
| 723025 | 2006 JL_{85} | — | October 17, 2012 | Haleakala | Pan-STARRS 1 | · | 1.2 km | MPC · JPL |
| 723026 | 2006 JQ_{85} | — | August 10, 2007 | Kitt Peak | Spacewatch | · | 2.0 km | MPC · JPL |
| 723027 | 2006 JT_{85} | — | February 6, 2016 | Mount Lemmon | Mount Lemmon Survey | · | 2.6 km | MPC · JPL |
| 723028 | 2006 JW_{85} | — | March 24, 2014 | Haleakala | Pan-STARRS 1 | RAF | 720 m | MPC · JPL |
| 723029 | 2006 JB_{86} | — | February 9, 2016 | Haleakala | Pan-STARRS 1 | EOS | 1.7 km | MPC · JPL |
| 723030 | 2006 JD_{87} | — | December 28, 2013 | Kitt Peak | Spacewatch | · | 1.1 km | MPC · JPL |
| 723031 | 2006 JC_{88} | — | May 8, 2006 | Mount Lemmon | Mount Lemmon Survey | · | 3.0 km | MPC · JPL |
| 723032 | 2006 KT_{4} | — | May 19, 2006 | Mount Lemmon | Mount Lemmon Survey | · | 2.1 km | MPC · JPL |
| 723033 | 2006 KJ_{5} | — | May 19, 2006 | Mount Lemmon | Mount Lemmon Survey | · | 2.5 km | MPC · JPL |
| 723034 | 2006 KA_{8} | — | May 19, 2006 | Mount Lemmon | Mount Lemmon Survey | · | 1.1 km | MPC · JPL |
| 723035 | 2006 KB_{14} | — | May 20, 2006 | Palomar | NEAT | · | 730 m | MPC · JPL |
| 723036 | 2006 KN_{18} | — | May 21, 2006 | Kitt Peak | Spacewatch | · | 2.5 km | MPC · JPL |
| 723037 | 2006 KD_{19} | — | May 21, 2006 | Kitt Peak | Spacewatch | · | 1.6 km | MPC · JPL |
| 723038 | 2006 KY_{22} | — | May 21, 2006 | Kitt Peak | Spacewatch | · | 2.8 km | MPC · JPL |
| 723039 | 2006 KK_{24} | — | May 19, 2006 | Mount Lemmon | Mount Lemmon Survey | · | 3.1 km | MPC · JPL |
| 723040 | 2006 KB_{26} | — | May 20, 2006 | Kitt Peak | Spacewatch | · | 1.9 km | MPC · JPL |
| 723041 | 2006 KS_{26} | — | May 20, 2006 | Kitt Peak | Spacewatch | ADE | 1.6 km | MPC · JPL |
| 723042 | 2006 KB_{27} | — | February 2, 2006 | Kitt Peak | Spacewatch | · | 1.1 km | MPC · JPL |
| 723043 | 2006 KD_{27} | — | May 20, 2006 | Mount Lemmon | Mount Lemmon Survey | JUN | 860 m | MPC · JPL |
| 723044 | 2006 KX_{33} | — | May 20, 2006 | Kitt Peak | Spacewatch | · | 2.3 km | MPC · JPL |
| 723045 | 2006 KR_{36} | — | May 21, 2006 | Kitt Peak | Spacewatch | · | 2.5 km | MPC · JPL |
| 723046 | 2006 KM_{37} | — | May 22, 2006 | Kitt Peak | Spacewatch | · | 2.9 km | MPC · JPL |
| 723047 | 2006 KE_{44} | — | May 21, 2006 | Kitt Peak | Spacewatch | KON | 1.8 km | MPC · JPL |
| 723048 | 2006 KB_{45} | — | May 21, 2006 | Kitt Peak | Spacewatch | · | 1.4 km | MPC · JPL |
| 723049 | 2006 KR_{47} | — | May 21, 2006 | Kitt Peak | Spacewatch | KOR | 1.5 km | MPC · JPL |
| 723050 | 2006 KC_{48} | — | May 21, 2006 | Kitt Peak | Spacewatch | · | 3.6 km | MPC · JPL |
| 723051 | 2006 KP_{52} | — | May 21, 2006 | Kitt Peak | Spacewatch | · | 590 m | MPC · JPL |
| 723052 | 2006 KO_{55} | — | May 21, 2006 | Kitt Peak | Spacewatch | · | 2.6 km | MPC · JPL |
| 723053 | 2006 KC_{57} | — | May 9, 2006 | Mount Lemmon | Mount Lemmon Survey | TIR | 2.9 km | MPC · JPL |
| 723054 | 2006 KD_{58} | — | May 22, 2006 | Kitt Peak | Spacewatch | · | 2.0 km | MPC · JPL |
| 723055 | 2006 KQ_{69} | — | October 19, 2003 | Apache Point | SDSS Collaboration | · | 2.4 km | MPC · JPL |
| 723056 | 2006 KY_{70} | — | May 1, 2006 | Kitt Peak | Spacewatch | · | 850 m | MPC · JPL |
| 723057 | 2006 KZ_{70} | — | May 22, 2006 | Kitt Peak | Spacewatch | · | 750 m | MPC · JPL |
| 723058 | 2006 KP_{72} | — | May 23, 2006 | Kitt Peak | Spacewatch | · | 1.9 km | MPC · JPL |
| 723059 | 2006 KP_{75} | — | May 24, 2006 | Kitt Peak | Spacewatch | · | 2.0 km | MPC · JPL |
| 723060 | 2006 KZ_{76} | — | May 24, 2006 | Mount Lemmon | Mount Lemmon Survey | · | 1.7 km | MPC · JPL |
| 723061 | 2006 KL_{80} | — | May 25, 2006 | Mount Lemmon | Mount Lemmon Survey | · | 2.6 km | MPC · JPL |
| 723062 | 2006 KE_{81} | — | May 25, 2006 | Mount Lemmon | Mount Lemmon Survey | · | 1.7 km | MPC · JPL |
| 723063 | 2006 KM_{81} | — | May 25, 2006 | Palomar | NEAT | · | 1.9 km | MPC · JPL |
| 723064 | 2006 KA_{82} | — | November 23, 2003 | Kitt Peak | Spacewatch | · | 3.0 km | MPC · JPL |
| 723065 | 2006 KH_{83} | — | May 20, 2006 | Kitt Peak | Spacewatch | MAS | 540 m | MPC · JPL |
| 723066 | 2006 KL_{84} | — | September 19, 1998 | Apache Point | SDSS | · | 1.7 km | MPC · JPL |
| 723067 | 2006 KY_{84} | — | May 24, 2006 | Mount Lemmon | Mount Lemmon Survey | · | 2.3 km | MPC · JPL |
| 723068 | 2006 KY_{89} | — | May 8, 2006 | Kitt Peak | Spacewatch | VER | 2.6 km | MPC · JPL |
| 723069 | 2006 KM_{94} | — | November 30, 1995 | Kitt Peak | Spacewatch | · | 1.7 km | MPC · JPL |
| 723070 | 2006 KE_{95} | — | May 25, 2006 | Kitt Peak | Spacewatch | · | 1.2 km | MPC · JPL |
| 723071 | 2006 KR_{95} | — | September 18, 2003 | Kitt Peak | Spacewatch | · | 720 m | MPC · JPL |
| 723072 | 2006 KB_{96} | — | May 25, 2006 | Palomar | NEAT | · | 1.8 km | MPC · JPL |
| 723073 | 2006 KC_{96} | — | September 10, 2002 | Palomar | NEAT | · | 3.2 km | MPC · JPL |
| 723074 | 2006 KE_{96} | — | May 25, 2006 | Mount Lemmon | Mount Lemmon Survey | · | 1.8 km | MPC · JPL |
| 723075 | 2006 KB_{97} | — | May 25, 2006 | Mount Lemmon | Mount Lemmon Survey | · | 2.9 km | MPC · JPL |
| 723076 | 2006 KC_{104} | — | May 25, 2006 | Mount Lemmon | Mount Lemmon Survey | · | 2.5 km | MPC · JPL |
| 723077 | 2006 KY_{109} | — | May 31, 2006 | Mount Lemmon | Mount Lemmon Survey | · | 2.5 km | MPC · JPL |
| 723078 | 2006 KQ_{110} | — | May 31, 2006 | Mount Lemmon | Mount Lemmon Survey | · | 3.3 km | MPC · JPL |
| 723079 | 2006 KR_{112} | — | May 31, 2006 | Mount Lemmon | Mount Lemmon Survey | EUP | 4.6 km | MPC · JPL |
| 723080 | 2006 KK_{116} | — | May 4, 2006 | Kitt Peak | Spacewatch | MAR | 890 m | MPC · JPL |
| 723081 | 2006 KW_{121} | — | May 23, 2006 | Kitt Peak | Spacewatch | (194) | 1.1 km | MPC · JPL |
| 723082 | 2006 KO_{123} | — | February 4, 2005 | Catalina | CSS | · | 2.3 km | MPC · JPL |
| 723083 | 2006 KN_{129} | — | May 25, 2006 | Mauna Kea | P. A. Wiegert | · | 2.3 km | MPC · JPL |
| 723084 | 2006 KR_{129} | — | May 25, 2006 | Mauna Kea | P. A. Wiegert | · | 1.7 km | MPC · JPL |
| 723085 | 2006 KZ_{129} | — | May 25, 2006 | Mauna Kea | P. A. Wiegert | · | 2.5 km | MPC · JPL |
| 723086 | 2006 KA_{133} | — | May 25, 2006 | Mauna Kea | P. A. Wiegert | · | 2.2 km | MPC · JPL |
| 723087 | 2006 KC_{133} | — | June 4, 2006 | Mount Lemmon | Mount Lemmon Survey | · | 1.8 km | MPC · JPL |
| 723088 | 2006 KR_{135} | — | May 23, 2006 | Mount Lemmon | Mount Lemmon Survey | · | 1.5 km | MPC · JPL |
| 723089 | 2006 KV_{142} | — | May 25, 2006 | Mauna Kea | P. A. Wiegert | V | 500 m | MPC · JPL |
| 723090 | 2006 KZ_{145} | — | May 20, 2006 | Mount Lemmon | Mount Lemmon Survey | · | 1.9 km | MPC · JPL |
| 723091 | 2006 KJ_{146} | — | September 9, 2007 | Kitt Peak | Spacewatch | · | 2.0 km | MPC · JPL |
| 723092 | 2006 KE_{147} | — | October 14, 2013 | Mount Lemmon | Mount Lemmon Survey | EOS | 1.6 km | MPC · JPL |
| 723093 | 2006 KM_{147} | — | March 30, 2011 | Mount Lemmon | Mount Lemmon Survey | · | 2.2 km | MPC · JPL |
| 723094 | 2006 KV_{147} | — | April 3, 2010 | WISE | WISE | · | 3.1 km | MPC · JPL |
| 723095 | 2006 KR_{149} | — | July 11, 2018 | Haleakala | Pan-STARRS 1 | · | 2.5 km | MPC · JPL |
| 723096 | 2006 KT_{149} | — | October 28, 2008 | Mount Lemmon | Mount Lemmon Survey | EOS | 1.6 km | MPC · JPL |
| 723097 | 2006 KW_{149} | — | November 12, 2007 | Mount Lemmon | Mount Lemmon Survey | · | 1.4 km | MPC · JPL |
| 723098 | 2006 KX_{149} | — | April 26, 2017 | Haleakala | Pan-STARRS 1 | · | 2.8 km | MPC · JPL |
| 723099 | 2006 KZ_{149} | — | May 24, 2006 | Mount Lemmon | Mount Lemmon Survey | EOS | 1.6 km | MPC · JPL |
| 723100 | 2006 KD_{150} | — | November 17, 2008 | Kitt Peak | Spacewatch | · | 2.0 km | MPC · JPL |

== 723101–723200 ==
back to top

| Designation | | | Discovery | | | Properties | | Ref |
| Permanent | Provisional | Named after | Date | Site | Discoverer(s) | Category | Diam. | Ref |
|---|---|---|---|---|---|---|---|---|
| 723101 | 2006 KR_{150} | — | May 24, 2006 | Kitt Peak | Spacewatch | EUN | 1.1 km | MPC · JPL |
| 723102 | 2006 KV_{150} | — | March 19, 2010 | Kitt Peak | Spacewatch | · | 1.1 km | MPC · JPL |
| 723103 | 2006 KC_{151} | — | January 22, 2015 | Haleakala | Pan-STARRS 1 | · | 1.5 km | MPC · JPL |
| 723104 | 2006 KE_{151} | — | October 22, 2013 | Haleakala | Pan-STARRS 1 | · | 2.3 km | MPC · JPL |
| 723105 | 2006 KQ_{151} | — | May 20, 2006 | Kitt Peak | Spacewatch | · | 1.2 km | MPC · JPL |
| 723106 | 2006 KR_{151} | — | April 27, 2010 | WISE | WISE | · | 2.5 km | MPC · JPL |
| 723107 | 2006 KQ_{152} | — | November 7, 2007 | Catalina | CSS | · | 1.4 km | MPC · JPL |
| 723108 | 2006 KT_{152} | — | January 21, 2015 | Haleakala | Pan-STARRS 1 | · | 1.9 km | MPC · JPL |
| 723109 | 2006 KX_{152} | — | December 24, 2014 | Mount Lemmon | Mount Lemmon Survey | · | 500 m | MPC · JPL |
| 723110 | 2006 KR_{153} | — | February 5, 2016 | Haleakala | Pan-STARRS 1 | · | 2.3 km | MPC · JPL |
| 723111 | 2006 KA_{154} | — | November 21, 2008 | Kitt Peak | Spacewatch | · | 2.1 km | MPC · JPL |
| 723112 | 2006 KB_{154} | — | October 28, 2013 | Mount Lemmon | Mount Lemmon Survey | EOS | 1.4 km | MPC · JPL |
| 723113 | 2006 KD_{154} | — | March 7, 2016 | Haleakala | Pan-STARRS 1 | EOS | 1.6 km | MPC · JPL |
| 723114 | 2006 KX_{155} | — | May 21, 2006 | Kitt Peak | Spacewatch | · | 1.4 km | MPC · JPL |
| 723115 | 2006 KP_{156} | — | October 17, 2012 | Haleakala | Pan-STARRS 1 | HOF | 2.1 km | MPC · JPL |
| 723116 | 2006 KC_{157} | — | May 31, 2006 | Mount Lemmon | Mount Lemmon Survey | THM | 1.9 km | MPC · JPL |
| 723117 | 2006 LK_{5} | — | June 3, 2006 | Siding Spring | SSS | · | 2.2 km | MPC · JPL |
| 723118 | 2006 LG_{6} | — | June 4, 2006 | Mount Lemmon | Mount Lemmon Survey | · | 690 m | MPC · JPL |
| 723119 | 2006 LR_{6} | — | June 3, 2006 | Siding Spring | SSS | · | 3.2 km | MPC · JPL |
| 723120 | 2006 LC_{8} | — | October 26, 2008 | Mount Lemmon | Mount Lemmon Survey | EMA | 2.4 km | MPC · JPL |
| 723121 | 2006 LS_{8} | — | January 28, 2014 | Mount Lemmon | Mount Lemmon Survey | · | 1.3 km | MPC · JPL |
| 723122 | 2006 LW_{8} | — | March 10, 2016 | Mount Lemmon | Mount Lemmon Survey | EOS | 1.6 km | MPC · JPL |
| 723123 | 2006 LC_{9} | — | June 5, 2010 | WISE | WISE | · | 2.9 km | MPC · JPL |
| 723124 | 2006 MA_{1} | — | May 24, 2006 | Mount Lemmon | Mount Lemmon Survey | · | 1.4 km | MPC · JPL |
| 723125 | 2006 MM_{2} | — | June 16, 2006 | Kitt Peak | Spacewatch | KON | 1.8 km | MPC · JPL |
| 723126 | 2006 MA_{3} | — | June 19, 2006 | Kitt Peak | Spacewatch | MAR | 890 m | MPC · JPL |
| 723127 | 2006 MB_{3} | — | June 19, 2006 | Kitt Peak | Spacewatch | · | 1.6 km | MPC · JPL |
| 723128 | 2006 MB_{6} | — | June 19, 2006 | Kitt Peak | Spacewatch | · | 2.2 km | MPC · JPL |
| 723129 | 2006 MO_{13} | — | June 23, 2006 | Lulin | LUSS | T_{j} (2.98) · EUP | 4.1 km | MPC · JPL |
| 723130 | 2006 MQ_{15} | — | August 27, 2013 | Haleakala | Pan-STARRS 1 | · | 590 m | MPC · JPL |
| 723131 | 2006 MT_{15} | — | June 22, 2006 | Kitt Peak | Spacewatch | · | 1.4 km | MPC · JPL |
| 723132 | 2006 MX_{15} | — | August 2, 2010 | WISE | WISE | · | 930 m | MPC · JPL |
| 723133 | 2006 MN_{16} | — | April 15, 2010 | Mount Lemmon | Mount Lemmon Survey | JUN | 760 m | MPC · JPL |
| 723134 | 2006 MR_{16} | — | June 18, 2006 | Kitt Peak | Spacewatch | · | 3.1 km | MPC · JPL |
| 723135 | 2006 MY_{16} | — | November 13, 2010 | Mount Lemmon | Mount Lemmon Survey | L4 | 6.5 km | MPC · JPL |
| 723136 | 2006 NL | — | July 2, 2006 | Socorro | LINEAR | ATE | 360 m | MPC · JPL |
| 723137 | 2006 OL_{6} | — | July 21, 2006 | Mount Lemmon | Mount Lemmon Survey | · | 2.0 km | MPC · JPL |
| 723138 | 2006 OO_{19} | — | July 20, 2006 | Siding Spring | SSS | · | 2.7 km | MPC · JPL |
| 723139 | 2006 OV_{22} | — | March 13, 2005 | Anderson Mesa | LONEOS | · | 3.4 km | MPC · JPL |
| 723140 | 2006 OG_{27} | — | July 21, 2006 | Mount Lemmon | Mount Lemmon Survey | · | 1.0 km | MPC · JPL |
| 723141 | 2006 OJ_{30} | — | January 30, 2009 | Mount Lemmon | Mount Lemmon Survey | · | 1.2 km | MPC · JPL |
| 723142 | 2006 ON_{33} | — | July 19, 2006 | Mauna Kea | P. A. Wiegert, D. Subasinghe | · | 1.1 km | MPC · JPL |
| 723143 | 2006 OQ_{35} | — | July 19, 2006 | Mauna Kea | P. A. Wiegert, D. Subasinghe | · | 1.5 km | MPC · JPL |
| 723144 | 2006 OA_{39} | — | November 19, 2007 | Kitt Peak | Spacewatch | MAS | 530 m | MPC · JPL |
| 723145 | 2006 OG_{39} | — | November 11, 2010 | Mount Lemmon | Mount Lemmon Survey | · | 610 m | MPC · JPL |
| 723146 | 2006 PX_{2} | — | August 12, 2006 | Palomar | NEAT | · | 3.1 km | MPC · JPL |
| 723147 | 2006 PW_{17} | — | August 13, 2006 | Palomar | NEAT | · | 700 m | MPC · JPL |
| 723148 | 2006 PH_{28} | — | March 19, 2001 | Apache Point | SDSS | MAR | 1.0 km | MPC · JPL |
| 723149 | 2006 PM_{33} | — | August 13, 2006 | Palomar | NEAT | BRG | 1.2 km | MPC · JPL |
| 723150 | 2006 PU_{34} | — | May 24, 2006 | Mount Lemmon | Mount Lemmon Survey | · | 3.5 km | MPC · JPL |
| 723151 | 2006 PB_{39} | — | June 23, 2006 | Palomar | NEAT | ERI | 1.7 km | MPC · JPL |
| 723152 | 2006 PA_{42} | — | August 17, 2006 | Palomar | NEAT | · | 2.8 km | MPC · JPL |
| 723153 | 2006 QD_{22} | — | October 4, 2002 | Palomar | NEAT | · | 1.2 km | MPC · JPL |
| 723154 | 2006 QM_{22} | — | March 11, 2005 | Kitt Peak | Spacewatch | · | 2.3 km | MPC · JPL |
| 723155 | 2006 QJ_{33} | — | August 24, 2006 | Wrightwood | J. W. Young | JUN | 1.1 km | MPC · JPL |
| 723156 | 2006 QV_{53} | — | August 16, 2006 | Siding Spring | SSS | · | 730 m | MPC · JPL |
| 723157 | 2006 QE_{62} | — | August 22, 2006 | Palomar | NEAT | · | 1.6 km | MPC · JPL |
| 723158 | 2006 QB_{70} | — | August 21, 2006 | Kitt Peak | Spacewatch | LUT | 4.6 km | MPC · JPL |
| 723159 | 2006 QE_{70} | — | August 21, 2006 | Kitt Peak | Spacewatch | · | 1.2 km | MPC · JPL |
| 723160 | 2006 QW_{71} | — | August 21, 2006 | Kitt Peak | Spacewatch | · | 2.4 km | MPC · JPL |
| 723161 | 2006 QP_{72} | — | August 21, 2006 | Kitt Peak | Spacewatch | DOR | 1.6 km | MPC · JPL |
| 723162 | 2006 QT_{78} | — | August 23, 2006 | Socorro | LINEAR | · | 1.6 km | MPC · JPL |
| 723163 | 2006 QZ_{82} | — | August 27, 2006 | Kitt Peak | Spacewatch | · | 2.6 km | MPC · JPL |
| 723164 | 2006 QV_{83} | — | February 23, 2003 | Kitt Peak | Spacewatch | LIX | 3.5 km | MPC · JPL |
| 723165 | 2006 QQ_{91} | — | July 21, 2006 | Catalina | CSS | · | 5.0 km | MPC · JPL |
| 723166 | 2006 QE_{98} | — | August 22, 2006 | Palomar | NEAT | · | 3.0 km | MPC · JPL |
| 723167 | 2006 QQ_{105} | — | August 28, 2006 | Catalina | CSS | · | 2.4 km | MPC · JPL |
| 723168 | 2006 QV_{109} | — | August 19, 2006 | Kitt Peak | Spacewatch | · | 950 m | MPC · JPL |
| 723169 | 2006 QZ_{111} | — | August 22, 2006 | Palomar | NEAT | · | 1.9 km | MPC · JPL |
| 723170 | 2006 QQ_{114} | — | December 31, 2002 | Kitt Peak | Spacewatch | VER | 3.6 km | MPC · JPL |
| 723171 | 2006 QM_{125} | — | August 24, 2006 | Palomar | NEAT | · | 870 m | MPC · JPL |
| 723172 | 2006 QT_{127} | — | August 17, 2006 | Palomar | NEAT | · | 2.5 km | MPC · JPL |
| 723173 | 2006 QU_{127} | — | November 11, 2001 | Apache Point | SDSS Collaboration | LIX | 3.4 km | MPC · JPL |
| 723174 | 2006 QB_{130} | — | August 19, 2006 | Palomar | NEAT | · | 890 m | MPC · JPL |
| 723175 | 2006 QH_{138} | — | January 19, 2004 | Kitt Peak | Spacewatch | · | 2.5 km | MPC · JPL |
| 723176 | 2006 QF_{140} | — | August 21, 2006 | Palomar | NEAT | · | 3.1 km | MPC · JPL |
| 723177 | 2006 QV_{146} | — | August 18, 2006 | Kitt Peak | Spacewatch | NEM | 1.6 km | MPC · JPL |
| 723178 | 2006 QF_{152} | — | August 19, 2006 | Kitt Peak | Spacewatch | · | 1.8 km | MPC · JPL |
| 723179 | 2006 QX_{153} | — | August 19, 2006 | Kitt Peak | Spacewatch | · | 2.2 km | MPC · JPL |
| 723180 | 2006 QD_{159} | — | August 19, 2006 | Kitt Peak | Spacewatch | · | 1.2 km | MPC · JPL |
| 723181 | 2006 QQ_{160} | — | August 19, 2006 | Kitt Peak | Spacewatch | · | 1.6 km | MPC · JPL |
| 723182 | 2006 QJ_{174} | — | August 27, 2006 | Kitt Peak | Spacewatch | VER | 2.0 km | MPC · JPL |
| 723183 | 2006 QW_{188} | — | August 19, 2006 | Kitt Peak | Spacewatch | · | 2.9 km | MPC · JPL |
| 723184 | 2006 QL_{190} | — | August 29, 2006 | Kitt Peak | Spacewatch | · | 860 m | MPC · JPL |
| 723185 | 2006 QM_{190} | — | August 10, 2013 | Kitt Peak | Spacewatch | · | 830 m | MPC · JPL |
| 723186 | 2006 QO_{190} | — | May 1, 2016 | Haleakala | Pan-STARRS 1 | · | 820 m | MPC · JPL |
| 723187 | 2006 QZ_{190} | — | August 28, 2006 | Kitt Peak | Spacewatch | · | 760 m | MPC · JPL |
| 723188 | 2006 QE_{191} | — | August 27, 2006 | Kitt Peak | Spacewatch | · | 1.3 km | MPC · JPL |
| 723189 | 2006 QT_{191} | — | August 19, 2006 | Kitt Peak | Spacewatch | · | 890 m | MPC · JPL |
| 723190 | 2006 QR_{194} | — | August 30, 2006 | Anderson Mesa | LONEOS | · | 1.3 km | MPC · JPL |
| 723191 | 2006 QV_{194} | — | August 18, 2006 | Kitt Peak | Spacewatch | · | 2.6 km | MPC · JPL |
| 723192 | 2006 QY_{194} | — | June 11, 2010 | WISE | WISE | PHO | 1.0 km | MPC · JPL |
| 723193 | 2006 QQ_{195} | — | April 5, 2014 | Haleakala | Pan-STARRS 1 | · | 1.5 km | MPC · JPL |
| 723194 | 2006 QQ_{196} | — | December 30, 2007 | Mount Lemmon | Mount Lemmon Survey | · | 1.5 km | MPC · JPL |
| 723195 | 2006 QR_{196} | — | August 30, 2006 | Anderson Mesa | LONEOS | · | 1.3 km | MPC · JPL |
| 723196 | 2006 QM_{197} | — | August 29, 2006 | Kitt Peak | Spacewatch | · | 990 m | MPC · JPL |
| 723197 | 2006 QJ_{198} | — | August 19, 2006 | Kitt Peak | Spacewatch | · | 1.3 km | MPC · JPL |
| 723198 | 2006 QN_{198} | — | August 18, 2006 | Kitt Peak | Spacewatch | · | 2.5 km | MPC · JPL |
| 723199 | 2006 QB_{199} | — | August 16, 2006 | Palomar | NEAT | · | 1.8 km | MPC · JPL |
| 723200 | 2006 QJ_{199} | — | September 6, 2013 | Kitt Peak | Spacewatch | · | 650 m | MPC · JPL |

== 723201–723300 ==
back to top

| Designation | | | Discovery | | | Properties | | Ref |
| Permanent | Provisional | Named after | Date | Site | Discoverer(s) | Category | Diam. | Ref |
|---|---|---|---|---|---|---|---|---|
| 723201 | 2006 QH_{203} | — | August 28, 2006 | Kitt Peak | Spacewatch | · | 1.2 km | MPC · JPL |
| 723202 | 2006 QJ_{203} | — | August 28, 2006 | Kitt Peak | Spacewatch | · | 1.3 km | MPC · JPL |
| 723203 | 2006 QH_{206} | — | August 27, 2006 | Kitt Peak | Spacewatch | · | 3.1 km | MPC · JPL |
| 723204 | 2006 QD_{207} | — | August 28, 2006 | Kitt Peak | Spacewatch | V | 440 m | MPC · JPL |
| 723205 | 2006 RH_{30} | — | September 15, 2006 | Kitt Peak | Spacewatch | · | 2.4 km | MPC · JPL |
| 723206 | 2006 RS_{30} | — | September 15, 2006 | Kitt Peak | Spacewatch | · | 1.0 km | MPC · JPL |
| 723207 | 2006 RR_{34} | — | September 13, 2006 | Palomar | NEAT | · | 1.4 km | MPC · JPL |
| 723208 | 2006 RT_{36} | — | August 29, 2006 | Catalina | CSS | · | 1.8 km | MPC · JPL |
| 723209 | 2006 RW_{40} | — | September 14, 2006 | Kitt Peak | Spacewatch | · | 700 m | MPC · JPL |
| 723210 | 2006 RS_{64} | — | September 14, 2006 | Kitt Peak | Spacewatch | · | 2.3 km | MPC · JPL |
| 723211 | 2006 RX_{66} | — | September 15, 2006 | Kitt Peak | Spacewatch | · | 1.8 km | MPC · JPL |
| 723212 | 2006 RV_{68} | — | August 21, 2006 | Kitt Peak | Spacewatch | · | 2.3 km | MPC · JPL |
| 723213 | 2006 RF_{71} | — | September 15, 2006 | Kitt Peak | Spacewatch | GEF | 870 m | MPC · JPL |
| 723214 | 2006 RE_{90} | — | September 15, 2006 | Kitt Peak | Spacewatch | · | 1.6 km | MPC · JPL |
| 723215 | 2006 RM_{102} | — | September 14, 2006 | Catalina | CSS | JUN | 910 m | MPC · JPL |
| 723216 | 2006 RA_{107} | — | September 19, 2006 | Kitt Peak | Spacewatch | · | 2.2 km | MPC · JPL |
| 723217 Levesque | 2006 RY_{111} | Levesque | September 14, 2006 | Mauna Kea | Masiero, J., R. Jedicke | · | 1.3 km | MPC · JPL |
| 723218 Binsted | 2006 RE_{117} | Binsted | September 14, 2006 | Mauna Kea | Masiero, J., R. Jedicke | · | 860 m | MPC · JPL |
| 723219 | 2006 RH_{123} | — | May 4, 2014 | Haleakala | Pan-STARRS 1 | BRA | 1.2 km | MPC · JPL |
| 723220 | 2006 RY_{123} | — | September 15, 2006 | Kitt Peak | Spacewatch | AGN | 840 m | MPC · JPL |
| 723221 | 2006 RH_{124} | — | February 8, 2013 | Haleakala | Pan-STARRS 1 | · | 1.2 km | MPC · JPL |
| 723222 | 2006 SF_{2} | — | July 24, 2000 | Kitt Peak | Spacewatch | · | 3.8 km | MPC · JPL |
| 723223 | 2006 SB_{18} | — | September 17, 2006 | Kitt Peak | Spacewatch | · | 2.3 km | MPC · JPL |
| 723224 | 2006 SG_{18} | — | September 17, 2006 | Kitt Peak | Spacewatch | · | 2.0 km | MPC · JPL |
| 723225 | 2006 SQ_{30} | — | August 29, 2006 | Kitt Peak | Spacewatch | · | 1.4 km | MPC · JPL |
| 723226 | 2006 ST_{33} | — | September 17, 2006 | Catalina | CSS | · | 1.6 km | MPC · JPL |
| 723227 | 2006 SH_{42} | — | January 30, 2008 | Mount Lemmon | Mount Lemmon Survey | MAS | 610 m | MPC · JPL |
| 723228 | 2006 SM_{45} | — | September 18, 2006 | Kitt Peak | Spacewatch | EOS | 1.6 km | MPC · JPL |
| 723229 | 2006 SB_{54} | — | September 16, 2006 | Catalina | CSS | · | 1.4 km | MPC · JPL |
| 723230 | 2006 SX_{64} | — | September 20, 2006 | Bergisch Gladbach | W. Bickel | · | 2.6 km | MPC · JPL |
| 723231 | 2006 SP_{74} | — | September 19, 2006 | Kitt Peak | Spacewatch | DOR | 2.0 km | MPC · JPL |
| 723232 | 2006 ST_{81} | — | September 18, 2006 | Kitt Peak | Spacewatch | · | 2.4 km | MPC · JPL |
| 723233 | 2006 SB_{84} | — | September 18, 2006 | Kitt Peak | Spacewatch | · | 1.5 km | MPC · JPL |
| 723234 | 2006 SG_{89} | — | September 18, 2006 | Kitt Peak | Spacewatch | EOS | 1.5 km | MPC · JPL |
| 723235 | 2006 SX_{89} | — | September 18, 2006 | Kitt Peak | Spacewatch | · | 1.3 km | MPC · JPL |
| 723236 | 2006 SQ_{93} | — | September 18, 2006 | Kitt Peak | Spacewatch | · | 1.8 km | MPC · JPL |
| 723237 | 2006 SX_{102} | — | September 19, 2006 | Kitt Peak | Spacewatch | AGN | 820 m | MPC · JPL |
| 723238 | 2006 SG_{108} | — | March 16, 2005 | Kitt Peak | Spacewatch | NYS | 790 m | MPC · JPL |
| 723239 | 2006 SJ_{115} | — | September 15, 2006 | Kitt Peak | Spacewatch | · | 1.4 km | MPC · JPL |
| 723240 | 2006 SJ_{140} | — | August 27, 2006 | Kitt Peak | Spacewatch | · | 1.7 km | MPC · JPL |
| 723241 | 2006 SK_{140} | — | September 22, 2006 | Catalina | CSS | · | 1.3 km | MPC · JPL |
| 723242 | 2006 SF_{152} | — | September 19, 2006 | Kitt Peak | Spacewatch | · | 2.0 km | MPC · JPL |
| 723243 | 2006 SR_{154} | — | August 10, 2006 | Palomar | NEAT | · | 2.1 km | MPC · JPL |
| 723244 | 2006 SX_{155} | — | September 23, 2006 | Kitt Peak | Spacewatch | · | 2.8 km | MPC · JPL |
| 723245 | 2006 SF_{156} | — | September 23, 2006 | Kitt Peak | Spacewatch | · | 1.5 km | MPC · JPL |
| 723246 | 2006 SY_{158} | — | September 15, 2006 | Kitt Peak | Spacewatch | · | 1.5 km | MPC · JPL |
| 723247 | 2006 SX_{172} | — | September 17, 2006 | Kitt Peak | Spacewatch | · | 1.2 km | MPC · JPL |
| 723248 | 2006 SO_{175} | — | August 29, 2006 | Kitt Peak | Spacewatch | · | 3.8 km | MPC · JPL |
| 723249 | 2006 SD_{176} | — | September 17, 2006 | Kitt Peak | Spacewatch | · | 1.4 km | MPC · JPL |
| 723250 | 2006 SR_{177} | — | September 25, 2006 | Kitt Peak | Spacewatch | · | 940 m | MPC · JPL |
| 723251 | 2006 SG_{178} | — | November 5, 2002 | La Palma | A. Fitzsimmons | · | 830 m | MPC · JPL |
| 723252 | 2006 SD_{179} | — | September 14, 2006 | Kitt Peak | Spacewatch | VER | 2.3 km | MPC · JPL |
| 723253 | 2006 SB_{180} | — | September 19, 2006 | Kitt Peak | Spacewatch | · | 2.0 km | MPC · JPL |
| 723254 | 2006 SK_{182} | — | September 14, 2006 | Kitt Peak | Spacewatch | · | 730 m | MPC · JPL |
| 723255 | 2006 SF_{190} | — | September 19, 2006 | Kitt Peak | Spacewatch | · | 2.1 km | MPC · JPL |
| 723256 | 2006 SE_{193} | — | September 26, 2006 | Mount Lemmon | Mount Lemmon Survey | · | 1.5 km | MPC · JPL |
| 723257 | 2006 SY_{195} | — | September 26, 2006 | Mount Lemmon | Mount Lemmon Survey | · | 1.2 km | MPC · JPL |
| 723258 | 2006 SV_{196} | — | September 26, 2006 | Kitt Peak | Spacewatch | · | 1.4 km | MPC · JPL |
| 723259 | 2006 SJ_{200} | — | September 24, 2006 | Kitt Peak | Spacewatch | WIT | 820 m | MPC · JPL |
| 723260 | 2006 SQ_{201} | — | September 24, 2006 | Kitt Peak | Spacewatch | · | 2.0 km | MPC · JPL |
| 723261 | 2006 SQ_{209} | — | September 26, 2006 | Mount Lemmon | Mount Lemmon Survey | · | 1.4 km | MPC · JPL |
| 723262 | 2006 SG_{211} | — | September 18, 2006 | Catalina | CSS | · | 680 m | MPC · JPL |
| 723263 | 2006 SU_{226} | — | September 26, 2006 | Kitt Peak | Spacewatch | · | 840 m | MPC · JPL |
| 723264 | 2006 SV_{226} | — | September 26, 2006 | Kitt Peak | Spacewatch | · | 1.6 km | MPC · JPL |
| 723265 | 2006 SY_{229} | — | May 28, 2005 | Reedy Creek | J. Broughton | · | 3.7 km | MPC · JPL |
| 723266 | 2006 SH_{232} | — | September 26, 2006 | Kitt Peak | Spacewatch | · | 1.1 km | MPC · JPL |
| 723267 | 2006 SA_{233} | — | September 18, 2006 | Kitt Peak | Spacewatch | · | 570 m | MPC · JPL |
| 723268 | 2006 SW_{237} | — | September 26, 2006 | Kitt Peak | Spacewatch | · | 2.5 km | MPC · JPL |
| 723269 | 2006 SW_{239} | — | September 26, 2006 | Kitt Peak | Spacewatch | · | 1.3 km | MPC · JPL |
| 723270 | 2006 SV_{243} | — | September 26, 2006 | Kitt Peak | Spacewatch | · | 1.2 km | MPC · JPL |
| 723271 | 2006 SK_{255} | — | September 26, 2006 | Mount Lemmon | Mount Lemmon Survey | · | 2.4 km | MPC · JPL |
| 723272 | 2006 SR_{257} | — | September 19, 2006 | Kitt Peak | Spacewatch | · | 560 m | MPC · JPL |
| 723273 | 2006 SF_{276} | — | August 19, 2006 | Kitt Peak | Spacewatch | · | 2.4 km | MPC · JPL |
| 723274 | 2006 SS_{276} | — | September 28, 2006 | Kitt Peak | Spacewatch | AGN | 970 m | MPC · JPL |
| 723275 | 2006 SC_{278} | — | September 28, 2006 | Mount Lemmon | Mount Lemmon Survey | · | 2.3 km | MPC · JPL |
| 723276 | 2006 SJ_{282} | — | September 18, 2006 | Catalina | CSS | · | 810 m | MPC · JPL |
| 723277 | 2006 SW_{288} | — | September 26, 2006 | Catalina | CSS | · | 820 m | MPC · JPL |
| 723278 | 2006 SD_{291} | — | September 16, 2006 | Catalina | CSS | · | 2.0 km | MPC · JPL |
| 723279 | 2006 SC_{293} | — | September 25, 2006 | Kitt Peak | Spacewatch | · | 1.5 km | MPC · JPL |
| 723280 | 2006 SF_{297} | — | September 25, 2006 | Kitt Peak | Spacewatch | · | 1.9 km | MPC · JPL |
| 723281 | 2006 SG_{297} | — | September 14, 2006 | Kitt Peak | Spacewatch | · | 530 m | MPC · JPL |
| 723282 | 2006 SV_{308} | — | September 17, 2006 | Kitt Peak | Spacewatch | NEM | 1.6 km | MPC · JPL |
| 723283 | 2006 SJ_{315} | — | September 27, 2006 | Kitt Peak | Spacewatch | MAS | 510 m | MPC · JPL |
| 723284 | 2006 SU_{329} | — | May 22, 2001 | Cerro Tololo | Deep Ecliptic Survey | · | 1.6 km | MPC · JPL |
| 723285 | 2006 SY_{332} | — | September 28, 2006 | Kitt Peak | Spacewatch | · | 1.3 km | MPC · JPL |
| 723286 | 2006 SN_{335} | — | September 14, 2006 | Kitt Peak | Spacewatch | · | 2.6 km | MPC · JPL |
| 723287 | 2006 SO_{336} | — | September 14, 2006 | Kitt Peak | Spacewatch | · | 1.4 km | MPC · JPL |
| 723288 | 2006 SX_{337} | — | September 28, 2006 | Kitt Peak | Spacewatch | · | 1.4 km | MPC · JPL |
| 723289 | 2006 SG_{341} | — | September 28, 2006 | Kitt Peak | Spacewatch | HOF | 1.9 km | MPC · JPL |
| 723290 | 2006 SW_{344} | — | September 28, 2006 | Kitt Peak | Spacewatch | · | 1.2 km | MPC · JPL |
| 723291 | 2006 SR_{346} | — | September 28, 2006 | Kitt Peak | Spacewatch | HOF | 2.2 km | MPC · JPL |
| 723292 | 2006 SK_{362} | — | September 30, 2006 | Mount Lemmon | Mount Lemmon Survey | HOF | 2.7 km | MPC · JPL |
| 723293 | 2006 SQ_{366} | — | October 11, 2012 | Kitt Peak | Spacewatch | · | 3.4 km | MPC · JPL |
| 723294 | 2006 SJ_{376} | — | September 17, 2006 | Apache Point | SDSS Collaboration | · | 2.3 km | MPC · JPL |
| 723295 | 2006 SR_{380} | — | September 27, 2006 | Apache Point | SDSS Collaboration | · | 2.0 km | MPC · JPL |
| 723296 | 2006 SN_{382} | — | October 22, 2006 | Catalina | CSS | EUN | 1.2 km | MPC · JPL |
| 723297 | 2006 SY_{382} | — | September 26, 2006 | Mount Lemmon | Mount Lemmon Survey | THM | 1.7 km | MPC · JPL |
| 723298 | 2006 SQ_{383} | — | September 29, 2006 | Apache Point | SDSS Collaboration | · | 1.4 km | MPC · JPL |
| 723299 | 2006 SZ_{383} | — | September 17, 2006 | Apache Point | SDSS Collaboration | · | 1.4 km | MPC · JPL |
| 723300 | 2006 SG_{385} | — | August 28, 2006 | Apache Point | SDSS Collaboration | · | 1.4 km | MPC · JPL |

== 723301–723400 ==
back to top

| Designation | | | Discovery | | | Properties | | Ref |
| Permanent | Provisional | Named after | Date | Site | Discoverer(s) | Category | Diam. | Ref |
|---|---|---|---|---|---|---|---|---|
| 723301 | 2006 SC_{386} | — | September 16, 2006 | Apache Point | SDSS Collaboration | · | 1.4 km | MPC · JPL |
| 723302 | 2006 SR_{386} | — | September 29, 2006 | Apache Point | SDSS Collaboration | · | 2.2 km | MPC · JPL |
| 723303 | 2006 SB_{389} | — | November 16, 2006 | Catalina | CSS | · | 1.7 km | MPC · JPL |
| 723304 | 2006 SW_{399} | — | September 18, 2006 | Kitt Peak | Spacewatch | AGN | 900 m | MPC · JPL |
| 723305 | 2006 SR_{401} | — | September 30, 2006 | Mount Lemmon | Mount Lemmon Survey | · | 720 m | MPC · JPL |
| 723306 | 2006 SW_{405} | — | September 17, 2006 | Kitt Peak | Spacewatch | · | 1.2 km | MPC · JPL |
| 723307 | 2006 SY_{413} | — | March 23, 2015 | Mount Lemmon | Mount Lemmon Survey | · | 2.5 km | MPC · JPL |
| 723308 | 2006 SB_{414} | — | September 16, 2006 | Kitt Peak | Spacewatch | · | 1.2 km | MPC · JPL |
| 723309 | 2006 SJ_{415} | — | September 18, 2006 | Catalina | CSS | · | 750 m | MPC · JPL |
| 723310 | 2006 SR_{415} | — | May 9, 2005 | Mount Lemmon | Mount Lemmon Survey | · | 1.3 km | MPC · JPL |
| 723311 | 2006 SU_{415} | — | September 28, 2006 | Mount Lemmon | Mount Lemmon Survey | AGN | 1.0 km | MPC · JPL |
| 723312 | 2006 SP_{425} | — | September 28, 2006 | Catalina | CSS | · | 4.1 km | MPC · JPL |
| 723313 | 2006 SW_{425} | — | September 27, 2006 | Kitt Peak | Spacewatch | · | 2.9 km | MPC · JPL |
| 723314 | 2006 SY_{425} | — | September 17, 2006 | Kitt Peak | Spacewatch | · | 1.4 km | MPC · JPL |
| 723315 | 2006 SG_{426} | — | September 22, 2012 | Kitt Peak | Spacewatch | · | 2.5 km | MPC · JPL |
| 723316 | 2006 SM_{426} | — | April 15, 2010 | WISE | WISE | · | 1.5 km | MPC · JPL |
| 723317 | 2006 SW_{426} | — | September 15, 2006 | Kitt Peak | Spacewatch | · | 2.6 km | MPC · JPL |
| 723318 | 2006 SN_{427} | — | September 17, 2006 | Kitt Peak | Spacewatch | · | 1.3 km | MPC · JPL |
| 723319 | 2006 SK_{429} | — | September 17, 2006 | Catalina | CSS | · | 2.2 km | MPC · JPL |
| 723320 | 2006 SQ_{429} | — | September 24, 2006 | Kitt Peak | Spacewatch | · | 1.9 km | MPC · JPL |
| 723321 | 2006 SX_{433} | — | September 26, 2006 | Mount Lemmon | Mount Lemmon Survey | · | 1.3 km | MPC · JPL |
| 723322 | 2006 ST_{435} | — | January 25, 2009 | Kitt Peak | Spacewatch | · | 1.3 km | MPC · JPL |
| 723323 | 2006 SR_{436} | — | May 21, 2015 | Cerro Tololo-DECam | DECam | · | 1.8 km | MPC · JPL |
| 723324 | 2006 SU_{436} | — | September 27, 2006 | Kitt Peak | Spacewatch | EUN | 960 m | MPC · JPL |
| 723325 | 2006 SV_{436} | — | September 17, 2006 | Catalina | CSS | · | 2.0 km | MPC · JPL |
| 723326 | 2006 SY_{440} | — | September 26, 2006 | Mount Lemmon | Mount Lemmon Survey | · | 1.3 km | MPC · JPL |
| 723327 | 2006 SD_{441} | — | September 21, 2017 | Haleakala | Pan-STARRS 1 | · | 2.1 km | MPC · JPL |
| 723328 | 2006 SV_{442} | — | July 28, 2011 | Haleakala | Pan-STARRS 1 | HYG | 2.4 km | MPC · JPL |
| 723329 | 2006 SM_{443} | — | September 27, 2006 | Mount Lemmon | Mount Lemmon Survey | · | 1.5 km | MPC · JPL |
| 723330 | 2006 SN_{443} | — | December 15, 2007 | Mount Lemmon | Mount Lemmon Survey | · | 1.6 km | MPC · JPL |
| 723331 | 2006 SG_{444} | — | June 6, 2018 | Haleakala | Pan-STARRS 1 | · | 1.2 km | MPC · JPL |
| 723332 | 2006 SS_{444} | — | October 23, 2011 | Kitt Peak | Spacewatch | · | 1.6 km | MPC · JPL |
| 723333 | 2006 SW_{444} | — | August 28, 2006 | Catalina | CSS | EOS | 1.6 km | MPC · JPL |
| 723334 | 2006 SU_{445} | — | September 16, 2006 | Kitt Peak | Spacewatch | · | 1.4 km | MPC · JPL |
| 723335 | 2006 ST_{446} | — | September 26, 2006 | Kitt Peak | Spacewatch | · | 2.2 km | MPC · JPL |
| 723336 | 2006 SV_{446} | — | September 26, 2006 | Mount Lemmon | Mount Lemmon Survey | · | 1.3 km | MPC · JPL |
| 723337 | 2006 SA_{447} | — | September 26, 2006 | Catalina | CSS | · | 1.1 km | MPC · JPL |
| 723338 | 2006 SU_{449} | — | September 27, 2006 | Kitt Peak | Spacewatch | · | 1.4 km | MPC · JPL |
| 723339 | 2006 SG_{452} | — | September 28, 2006 | Kitt Peak | Spacewatch | · | 1.3 km | MPC · JPL |
| 723340 | 2006 SP_{454} | — | September 26, 2006 | Kitt Peak | Spacewatch | · | 1.4 km | MPC · JPL |
| 723341 | 2006 SC_{456} | — | April 7, 2005 | Kitt Peak | Spacewatch | · | 1.1 km | MPC · JPL |
| 723342 | 2006 TS_{4} | — | October 2, 2006 | Mount Lemmon | Mount Lemmon Survey | HOF | 2.4 km | MPC · JPL |
| 723343 | 2006 TF_{5} | — | May 4, 2005 | Kitt Peak | Spacewatch | · | 1.1 km | MPC · JPL |
| 723344 | 2006 TR_{18} | — | October 11, 2006 | Kitt Peak | Spacewatch | · | 930 m | MPC · JPL |
| 723345 | 2006 TE_{20} | — | September 28, 2006 | Mount Lemmon | Mount Lemmon Survey | · | 630 m | MPC · JPL |
| 723346 | 2006 TM_{46} | — | September 26, 2006 | Mount Lemmon | Mount Lemmon Survey | MAS | 580 m | MPC · JPL |
| 723347 | 2006 TH_{82} | — | October 13, 2006 | Kitt Peak | Spacewatch | HOF | 2.0 km | MPC · JPL |
| 723348 | 2006 TR_{83} | — | October 4, 2006 | Mount Lemmon | Mount Lemmon Survey | V | 500 m | MPC · JPL |
| 723349 | 2006 TZ_{84} | — | October 13, 2006 | Kitt Peak | Spacewatch | · | 1.6 km | MPC · JPL |
| 723350 | 2006 TW_{102} | — | September 28, 2006 | Mount Lemmon | Mount Lemmon Survey | · | 780 m | MPC · JPL |
| 723351 | 2006 TV_{113} | — | October 1, 2006 | Apache Point | SDSS Collaboration | · | 2.4 km | MPC · JPL |
| 723352 | 2006 TW_{113} | — | September 16, 2006 | Apache Point | SDSS Collaboration | · | 1.3 km | MPC · JPL |
| 723353 | 2006 TO_{120} | — | October 12, 2006 | Apache Point | SDSS Collaboration | · | 2.4 km | MPC · JPL |
| 723354 | 2006 TP_{126} | — | October 2, 2006 | Mount Lemmon | Mount Lemmon Survey | · | 1.5 km | MPC · JPL |
| 723355 | 2006 TH_{129} | — | February 16, 2004 | Catalina | CSS | · | 1.3 km | MPC · JPL |
| 723356 | 2006 TZ_{132} | — | October 3, 2006 | Mount Lemmon | Mount Lemmon Survey | · | 600 m | MPC · JPL |
| 723357 | 2006 TS_{133} | — | October 4, 2006 | Mount Lemmon | Mount Lemmon Survey | · | 1.5 km | MPC · JPL |
| 723358 | 2006 TZ_{135} | — | March 3, 2013 | Mount Lemmon | Mount Lemmon Survey | · | 1.4 km | MPC · JPL |
| 723359 | 2006 TP_{137} | — | March 12, 2013 | Kitt Peak | Spacewatch | · | 1.3 km | MPC · JPL |
| 723360 | 2006 TV_{137} | — | October 10, 2015 | Haleakala | Pan-STARRS 1 | · | 1.6 km | MPC · JPL |
| 723361 | 2006 TA_{140} | — | October 2, 2006 | Mount Lemmon | Mount Lemmon Survey | · | 1.6 km | MPC · JPL |
| 723362 | 2006 TS_{142} | — | October 2, 2006 | Mount Lemmon | Mount Lemmon Survey | · | 2.3 km | MPC · JPL |
| 723363 | 2006 UB_{4} | — | October 17, 2006 | Piszkéstető | K. Sárneczky | · | 1.2 km | MPC · JPL |
| 723364 | 2006 UN_{18} | — | September 25, 2006 | Kitt Peak | Spacewatch | · | 1.5 km | MPC · JPL |
| 723365 | 2006 UA_{28} | — | September 26, 2006 | Mount Lemmon | Mount Lemmon Survey | HOF | 2.4 km | MPC · JPL |
| 723366 | 2006 UK_{76} | — | September 27, 2006 | Kitt Peak | Spacewatch | · | 2.1 km | MPC · JPL |
| 723367 | 2006 UA_{77} | — | October 17, 2006 | Kitt Peak | Spacewatch | EUN | 1.0 km | MPC · JPL |
| 723368 | 2006 UX_{98} | — | October 18, 2006 | Kitt Peak | Spacewatch | · | 1.5 km | MPC · JPL |
| 723369 | 2006 UN_{105} | — | October 3, 2006 | Mount Lemmon | Mount Lemmon Survey | · | 1.6 km | MPC · JPL |
| 723370 | 2006 UW_{105} | — | October 18, 2006 | Kitt Peak | Spacewatch | EUN | 900 m | MPC · JPL |
| 723371 | 2006 UE_{107} | — | October 18, 2006 | Kitt Peak | Spacewatch | · | 2.1 km | MPC · JPL |
| 723372 | 2006 UT_{115} | — | October 19, 2006 | Kitt Peak | Spacewatch | · | 1.4 km | MPC · JPL |
| 723373 | 2006 UW_{119} | — | September 30, 2006 | Mount Lemmon | Mount Lemmon Survey | · | 1.4 km | MPC · JPL |
| 723374 | 2006 UP_{123} | — | October 2, 2006 | Kitt Peak | Spacewatch | · | 1.5 km | MPC · JPL |
| 723375 | 2006 UR_{123} | — | September 24, 2006 | Kitt Peak | Spacewatch | · | 1.2 km | MPC · JPL |
| 723376 | 2006 UD_{125} | — | October 19, 2006 | Kitt Peak | Spacewatch | · | 1.5 km | MPC · JPL |
| 723377 | 2006 UP_{125} | — | October 19, 2006 | Kitt Peak | Spacewatch | HOF | 1.9 km | MPC · JPL |
| 723378 | 2006 UL_{128} | — | October 19, 2006 | Kitt Peak | Spacewatch | GEF | 790 m | MPC · JPL |
| 723379 | 2006 UO_{128} | — | October 19, 2006 | Kitt Peak | Spacewatch | AGN | 910 m | MPC · JPL |
| 723380 | 2006 UU_{131} | — | October 19, 2006 | Kitt Peak | Spacewatch | · | 1.2 km | MPC · JPL |
| 723381 | 2006 UE_{133} | — | October 19, 2006 | Kitt Peak | Spacewatch | · | 720 m | MPC · JPL |
| 723382 | 2006 UM_{133} | — | September 26, 2006 | Mount Lemmon | Mount Lemmon Survey | · | 1.4 km | MPC · JPL |
| 723383 | 2006 UT_{133} | — | October 19, 2006 | Kitt Peak | Spacewatch | · | 1.6 km | MPC · JPL |
| 723384 | 2006 UM_{141} | — | October 19, 2006 | Mount Lemmon | Mount Lemmon Survey | · | 1.4 km | MPC · JPL |
| 723385 | 2006 UR_{142} | — | October 19, 2006 | Kitt Peak | Spacewatch | ADE | 1.6 km | MPC · JPL |
| 723386 | 2006 UV_{144} | — | August 26, 2006 | Lulin | LUSS | · | 1.3 km | MPC · JPL |
| 723387 | 2006 UJ_{151} | — | October 20, 2006 | Kitt Peak | Spacewatch | EOS | 1.3 km | MPC · JPL |
| 723388 | 2006 UB_{154} | — | August 21, 2006 | Kitt Peak | Spacewatch | · | 1.2 km | MPC · JPL |
| 723389 | 2006 UM_{154} | — | October 2, 2006 | Mount Lemmon | Mount Lemmon Survey | · | 1.6 km | MPC · JPL |
| 723390 | 2006 UL_{158} | — | October 21, 2006 | Mount Lemmon | Mount Lemmon Survey | · | 1.5 km | MPC · JPL |
| 723391 | 2006 UR_{159} | — | October 21, 2006 | Mount Lemmon | Mount Lemmon Survey | KOR | 1.1 km | MPC · JPL |
| 723392 | 2006 UZ_{164} | — | October 3, 2006 | Mount Lemmon | Mount Lemmon Survey | · | 2.4 km | MPC · JPL |
| 723393 | 2006 UR_{167} | — | October 2, 2006 | Mount Lemmon | Mount Lemmon Survey | · | 2.4 km | MPC · JPL |
| 723394 | 2006 UX_{168} | — | September 18, 2006 | Kitt Peak | Spacewatch | · | 1.1 km | MPC · JPL |
| 723395 | 2006 UH_{171} | — | October 21, 2006 | Mount Lemmon | Mount Lemmon Survey | AGN | 930 m | MPC · JPL |
| 723396 | 2006 UW_{182} | — | October 16, 2006 | Catalina | CSS | · | 5.7 km | MPC · JPL |
| 723397 | 2006 UP_{194} | — | October 20, 2006 | Kitt Peak | Spacewatch | · | 1.4 km | MPC · JPL |
| 723398 | 2006 UJ_{203} | — | September 30, 2006 | Catalina | CSS | · | 970 m | MPC · JPL |
| 723399 | 2006 UJ_{206} | — | October 23, 2006 | Kitt Peak | Spacewatch | · | 2.3 km | MPC · JPL |
| 723400 | 2006 UT_{235} | — | October 23, 2006 | Kitt Peak | Spacewatch | · | 520 m | MPC · JPL |

== 723401–723500 ==
back to top

| Designation | | | Discovery | | | Properties | | Ref |
| Permanent | Provisional | Named after | Date | Site | Discoverer(s) | Category | Diam. | Ref |
|---|---|---|---|---|---|---|---|---|
| 723401 | 2006 UO_{240} | — | October 11, 2006 | Kitt Peak | Spacewatch | AGN | 870 m | MPC · JPL |
| 723402 | 2006 UB_{248} | — | October 27, 2006 | Mount Lemmon | Mount Lemmon Survey | HOF | 2.0 km | MPC · JPL |
| 723403 | 2006 UW_{250} | — | October 27, 2006 | Mount Lemmon | Mount Lemmon Survey | · | 1.8 km | MPC · JPL |
| 723404 | 2006 UM_{252} | — | October 16, 2006 | Kitt Peak | Spacewatch | · | 1.4 km | MPC · JPL |
| 723405 | 2006 UL_{255} | — | October 27, 2006 | Mount Lemmon | Mount Lemmon Survey | AGN | 860 m | MPC · JPL |
| 723406 | 2006 UM_{257} | — | October 20, 2006 | Kitt Peak | Spacewatch | · | 1.5 km | MPC · JPL |
| 723407 | 2006 UB_{263} | — | October 27, 2006 | Catalina | CSS | · | 2.2 km | MPC · JPL |
| 723408 | 2006 UO_{266} | — | October 3, 2006 | Mount Lemmon | Mount Lemmon Survey | · | 1.1 km | MPC · JPL |
| 723409 | 2006 UB_{267} | — | October 23, 2006 | Kitt Peak | Spacewatch | H | 500 m | MPC · JPL |
| 723410 | 2006 UG_{269} | — | October 16, 2006 | Kitt Peak | Spacewatch | · | 1.5 km | MPC · JPL |
| 723411 | 2006 UT_{279} | — | October 20, 2006 | Kitt Peak | Spacewatch | HOF | 2.1 km | MPC · JPL |
| 723412 | 2006 UT_{292} | — | October 28, 2006 | Mount Lemmon | Mount Lemmon Survey | · | 2.9 km | MPC · JPL |
| 723413 | 2006 UH_{293} | — | July 21, 2006 | Mount Lemmon | Mount Lemmon Survey | EOS | 1.8 km | MPC · JPL |
| 723414 | 2006 UG_{302} | — | August 18, 2006 | Kitt Peak | Spacewatch | · | 1.4 km | MPC · JPL |
| 723415 | 2006 US_{307} | — | September 30, 2006 | Mount Lemmon | Mount Lemmon Survey | · | 960 m | MPC · JPL |
| 723416 | 2006 UP_{320} | — | March 15, 2004 | Kitt Peak | Spacewatch | MAS | 510 m | MPC · JPL |
| 723417 | 2006 UY_{322} | — | September 14, 2006 | Catalina | CSS | T_{j} (2.99) · EUP | 3.3 km | MPC · JPL |
| 723418 | 2006 UP_{323} | — | September 15, 2006 | Kitt Peak | Spacewatch | · | 1.3 km | MPC · JPL |
| 723419 | 2006 UX_{324} | — | October 19, 2006 | Kitt Peak | Deep Ecliptic Survey | · | 500 m | MPC · JPL |
| 723420 | 2006 UD_{341} | — | September 30, 2006 | Mount Lemmon | Mount Lemmon Survey | · | 870 m | MPC · JPL |
| 723421 | 2006 UQ_{364} | — | October 21, 2006 | Mount Lemmon | Mount Lemmon Survey | · | 750 m | MPC · JPL |
| 723422 | 2006 UV_{364} | — | October 22, 2006 | Mount Lemmon | Mount Lemmon Survey | · | 1.5 km | MPC · JPL |
| 723423 | 2006 UA_{365} | — | October 23, 2006 | Catalina | CSS | JUN | 1.3 km | MPC · JPL |
| 723424 | 2006 UK_{365} | — | October 27, 2006 | Catalina | CSS | · | 2.3 km | MPC · JPL |
| 723425 | 2006 UM_{367} | — | May 25, 2010 | WISE | WISE | · | 3.3 km | MPC · JPL |
| 723426 | 2006 UY_{367} | — | June 6, 2010 | WISE | WISE | · | 1.6 km | MPC · JPL |
| 723427 | 2006 UO_{368} | — | November 12, 2006 | Mount Lemmon | Mount Lemmon Survey | · | 1.4 km | MPC · JPL |
| 723428 | 2006 UB_{369} | — | October 21, 2006 | Mount Lemmon | Mount Lemmon Survey | · | 1.3 km | MPC · JPL |
| 723429 | 2006 UJ_{370} | — | July 6, 2016 | Haleakala | Pan-STARRS 1 | · | 1.9 km | MPC · JPL |
| 723430 | 2006 UK_{370} | — | October 23, 2011 | Kitt Peak | Spacewatch | MRX | 700 m | MPC · JPL |
| 723431 | 2006 UP_{372} | — | October 27, 2006 | Mount Lemmon | Mount Lemmon Survey | SYL | 3.5 km | MPC · JPL |
| 723432 | 2006 UE_{373} | — | October 13, 2006 | Kitt Peak | Spacewatch | · | 1.5 km | MPC · JPL |
| 723433 | 2006 UF_{373} | — | October 20, 2006 | Kitt Peak | Spacewatch | · | 1.3 km | MPC · JPL |
| 723434 | 2006 UM_{373} | — | October 23, 2006 | Kitt Peak | Spacewatch | 3:2 | 5.7 km | MPC · JPL |
| 723435 | 2006 UT_{373} | — | October 21, 2006 | Mount Lemmon | Mount Lemmon Survey | V | 430 m | MPC · JPL |
| 723436 | 2006 UB_{374} | — | October 16, 2006 | Catalina | CSS | ADE | 1.5 km | MPC · JPL |
| 723437 | 2006 UV_{374} | — | October 2, 2006 | Mount Lemmon | Mount Lemmon Survey | · | 1 km | MPC · JPL |
| 723438 | 2006 UK_{376} | — | June 18, 2010 | WISE | WISE | T_{j} (2.98) · EUP | 3.2 km | MPC · JPL |
| 723439 | 2006 UW_{378} | — | November 24, 2006 | Mount Lemmon | Mount Lemmon Survey | SYL | 4.0 km | MPC · JPL |
| 723440 | 2006 UX_{378} | — | October 27, 2006 | Catalina | CSS | · | 1.6 km | MPC · JPL |
| 723441 | 2006 UZ_{378} | — | June 27, 2014 | Haleakala | Pan-STARRS 1 | · | 1.2 km | MPC · JPL |
| 723442 | 2006 UD_{380} | — | March 11, 2008 | Kitt Peak | Spacewatch | · | 1.2 km | MPC · JPL |
| 723443 | 2006 UE_{382} | — | October 21, 2006 | Kitt Peak | Spacewatch | VER | 2.2 km | MPC · JPL |
| 723444 | 2006 UT_{383} | — | April 13, 2008 | Mount Lemmon | Mount Lemmon Survey | (2076) | 590 m | MPC · JPL |
| 723445 | 2006 UQ_{390} | — | October 19, 2006 | Kitt Peak | Spacewatch | · | 1.4 km | MPC · JPL |
| 723446 | 2006 UO_{392} | — | October 17, 2006 | Kitt Peak | Spacewatch | · | 1.0 km | MPC · JPL |
| 723447 | 2006 UC_{393} | — | October 19, 2006 | Kitt Peak | Spacewatch | · | 1.5 km | MPC · JPL |
| 723448 | 2006 VN_{6} | — | November 10, 2006 | Kitt Peak | Spacewatch | · | 1.4 km | MPC · JPL |
| 723449 | 2006 VU_{11} | — | October 13, 2006 | Kitt Peak | Spacewatch | · | 1.7 km | MPC · JPL |
| 723450 | 2006 VU_{14} | — | September 25, 2006 | Mount Lemmon | Mount Lemmon Survey | · | 2.8 km | MPC · JPL |
| 723451 | 2006 VB_{22} | — | September 30, 2002 | Ondřejov | Ondřejov, Observatoř | MAS | 560 m | MPC · JPL |
| 723452 | 2006 VC_{52} | — | September 14, 2006 | Catalina | CSS | · | 1.7 km | MPC · JPL |
| 723453 | 2006 VL_{72} | — | November 11, 2006 | Mount Lemmon | Mount Lemmon Survey | · | 1.6 km | MPC · JPL |
| 723454 | 2006 VA_{75} | — | November 11, 2006 | Mount Lemmon | Mount Lemmon Survey | · | 1.8 km | MPC · JPL |
| 723455 | 2006 VJ_{76} | — | November 12, 2006 | Mount Lemmon | Mount Lemmon Survey | AGN | 960 m | MPC · JPL |
| 723456 | 2006 VO_{78} | — | September 28, 2002 | Trebur | Kretlow, M. | NYS | 1.0 km | MPC · JPL |
| 723457 | 2006 VZ_{80} | — | February 14, 2004 | Kitt Peak | Spacewatch | · | 730 m | MPC · JPL |
| 723458 | 2006 VQ_{82} | — | November 13, 2006 | Kitt Peak | Spacewatch | · | 3.3 km | MPC · JPL |
| 723459 | 2006 VM_{88} | — | November 14, 2006 | Mount Lemmon | Mount Lemmon Survey | · | 1.5 km | MPC · JPL |
| 723460 | 2006 VA_{92} | — | November 15, 2006 | Mount Lemmon | Mount Lemmon Survey | EUP | 3.8 km | MPC · JPL |
| 723461 | 2006 VP_{117} | — | September 27, 2006 | Mount Lemmon | Mount Lemmon Survey | · | 820 m | MPC · JPL |
| 723462 | 2006 VG_{118} | — | August 22, 2001 | Kitt Peak | Spacewatch | · | 1.5 km | MPC · JPL |
| 723463 | 2006 VS_{120} | — | November 14, 2006 | Kitt Peak | Spacewatch | · | 1.0 km | MPC · JPL |
| 723464 | 2006 VX_{121} | — | October 21, 2006 | Kitt Peak | Spacewatch | · | 1.7 km | MPC · JPL |
| 723465 | 2006 VZ_{123} | — | November 14, 2006 | Kitt Peak | Spacewatch | MAS | 530 m | MPC · JPL |
| 723466 | 2006 VY_{124} | — | November 14, 2006 | Kitt Peak | Spacewatch | · | 1.7 km | MPC · JPL |
| 723467 | 2006 VR_{125} | — | November 14, 2006 | Kitt Peak | Spacewatch | · | 2.3 km | MPC · JPL |
| 723468 | 2006 VT_{126} | — | November 15, 2006 | Kitt Peak | Spacewatch | · | 1.8 km | MPC · JPL |
| 723469 | 2006 VC_{131} | — | September 28, 2006 | Mount Lemmon | Mount Lemmon Survey | · | 560 m | MPC · JPL |
| 723470 | 2006 VH_{131} | — | November 15, 2006 | Kitt Peak | Spacewatch | · | 1.4 km | MPC · JPL |
| 723471 | 2006 VH_{132} | — | November 15, 2006 | Kitt Peak | Spacewatch | · | 1.6 km | MPC · JPL |
| 723472 | 2006 VP_{151} | — | October 21, 2006 | Kitt Peak | Spacewatch | · | 950 m | MPC · JPL |
| 723473 | 2006 VC_{168} | — | September 28, 2006 | Kitt Peak | Spacewatch | · | 1.6 km | MPC · JPL |
| 723474 | 2006 VB_{174} | — | October 28, 2006 | Mount Lemmon | Mount Lemmon Survey | AGN | 1 km | MPC · JPL |
| 723475 | 2006 VU_{176} | — | January 23, 2015 | Haleakala | Pan-STARRS 1 | · | 1.2 km | MPC · JPL |
| 723476 | 2006 VC_{177} | — | November 1, 2006 | Kitt Peak | Spacewatch | · | 610 m | MPC · JPL |
| 723477 | 2006 VU_{178} | — | November 11, 2006 | Kitt Peak | Spacewatch | JUN | 1.0 km | MPC · JPL |
| 723478 | 2006 VL_{180} | — | March 30, 2008 | Kitt Peak | Spacewatch | · | 1.2 km | MPC · JPL |
| 723479 | 2006 VO_{180} | — | November 15, 2006 | Kitt Peak | Spacewatch | · | 1.5 km | MPC · JPL |
| 723480 | 2006 VS_{180} | — | October 3, 2015 | Mount Lemmon | Mount Lemmon Survey | · | 1.3 km | MPC · JPL |
| 723481 | 2006 VM_{181} | — | July 4, 2014 | Haleakala | Pan-STARRS 1 | · | 1.5 km | MPC · JPL |
| 723482 | 2006 VA_{182} | — | February 10, 2008 | Mount Lemmon | Mount Lemmon Survey | AGN | 950 m | MPC · JPL |
| 723483 | 2006 VD_{186} | — | November 1, 2006 | Kitt Peak | Spacewatch | · | 900 m | MPC · JPL |
| 723484 | 2006 WZ_{5} | — | November 16, 2006 | Kitt Peak | Spacewatch | V | 450 m | MPC · JPL |
| 723485 | 2006 WW_{8} | — | November 16, 2006 | Kitt Peak | Spacewatch | NYS | 860 m | MPC · JPL |
| 723486 | 2006 WR_{9} | — | May 16, 2005 | Mount Lemmon | Mount Lemmon Survey | JUN | 770 m | MPC · JPL |
| 723487 | 2006 WW_{13} | — | August 26, 2005 | Palomar | NEAT | · | 3.0 km | MPC · JPL |
| 723488 | 2006 WP_{16} | — | November 17, 2006 | Kitt Peak | Spacewatch | VER | 3.3 km | MPC · JPL |
| 723489 | 2006 WK_{17} | — | November 1, 2006 | Mount Lemmon | Mount Lemmon Survey | · | 1.4 km | MPC · JPL |
| 723490 | 2006 WA_{20} | — | November 17, 2006 | Mount Lemmon | Mount Lemmon Survey | AGN | 990 m | MPC · JPL |
| 723491 | 2006 WE_{20} | — | November 17, 2006 | Mount Lemmon | Mount Lemmon Survey | · | 4.0 km | MPC · JPL |
| 723492 | 2006 WC_{21} | — | October 21, 2006 | Lulin | LUSS | · | 1.9 km | MPC · JPL |
| 723493 | 2006 WZ_{23} | — | November 17, 2006 | Mount Lemmon | Mount Lemmon Survey | · | 2.1 km | MPC · JPL |
| 723494 | 2006 WE_{25} | — | November 17, 2006 | Mount Lemmon | Mount Lemmon Survey | · | 2.1 km | MPC · JPL |
| 723495 | 2006 WR_{25} | — | November 17, 2006 | Mount Lemmon | Mount Lemmon Survey | AGN | 890 m | MPC · JPL |
| 723496 | 2006 WH_{31} | — | October 16, 2006 | Kitt Peak | Spacewatch | · | 800 m | MPC · JPL |
| 723497 | 2006 WN_{32} | — | November 16, 2006 | Kitt Peak | Spacewatch | EUN | 2.3 km | MPC · JPL |
| 723498 | 2006 WB_{34} | — | November 12, 2006 | Mount Lemmon | Mount Lemmon Survey | · | 1.2 km | MPC · JPL |
| 723499 | 2006 WH_{34} | — | October 3, 2006 | Mount Lemmon | Mount Lemmon Survey | · | 1.4 km | MPC · JPL |
| 723500 | 2006 WH_{35} | — | November 16, 2006 | Kitt Peak | Spacewatch | · | 2.4 km | MPC · JPL |

== 723501–723600 ==
back to top

| Designation | | | Discovery | | | Properties | | Ref |
| Permanent | Provisional | Named after | Date | Site | Discoverer(s) | Category | Diam. | Ref |
|---|---|---|---|---|---|---|---|---|
| 723501 | 2006 WS_{37} | — | November 16, 2006 | Kitt Peak | Spacewatch | · | 1.2 km | MPC · JPL |
| 723502 | 2006 WN_{39} | — | November 16, 2006 | Kitt Peak | Spacewatch | · | 1.7 km | MPC · JPL |
| 723503 | 2006 WN_{41} | — | November 16, 2006 | Kitt Peak | Spacewatch | BRA | 1.1 km | MPC · JPL |
| 723504 | 2006 WG_{42} | — | November 16, 2006 | Mount Lemmon | Mount Lemmon Survey | · | 920 m | MPC · JPL |
| 723505 | 2006 WA_{43} | — | November 16, 2006 | Kitt Peak | Spacewatch | V | 490 m | MPC · JPL |
| 723506 | 2006 WP_{44} | — | November 16, 2006 | Kitt Peak | Spacewatch | · | 2.3 km | MPC · JPL |
| 723507 | 2006 WO_{47} | — | November 16, 2006 | Kitt Peak | Spacewatch | · | 1.6 km | MPC · JPL |
| 723508 | 2006 WW_{50} | — | November 16, 2006 | Kitt Peak | Spacewatch | · | 1.6 km | MPC · JPL |
| 723509 | 2006 WF_{52} | — | November 16, 2006 | Kitt Peak | Spacewatch | · | 3.6 km | MPC · JPL |
| 723510 | 2006 WW_{59} | — | October 4, 2006 | Mount Lemmon | Mount Lemmon Survey | · | 1.4 km | MPC · JPL |
| 723511 | 2006 WT_{60} | — | October 31, 2006 | Catalina | CSS | · | 1.5 km | MPC · JPL |
| 723512 | 2006 WR_{75} | — | July 30, 2005 | Palomar | NEAT | · | 2.6 km | MPC · JPL |
| 723513 | 2006 WK_{77} | — | November 10, 2006 | Kitt Peak | Spacewatch | · | 770 m | MPC · JPL |
| 723514 | 2006 WG_{81} | — | October 22, 2006 | Palomar | NEAT | · | 880 m | MPC · JPL |
| 723515 | 2006 WM_{88} | — | September 28, 2005 | Palomar | NEAT | · | 3.4 km | MPC · JPL |
| 723516 | 2006 WP_{91} | — | October 31, 2006 | Kitt Peak | Spacewatch | · | 1.8 km | MPC · JPL |
| 723517 | 2006 WB_{93} | — | November 19, 2006 | Kitt Peak | Spacewatch | · | 1.4 km | MPC · JPL |
| 723518 | 2006 WZ_{98} | — | November 19, 2006 | Kitt Peak | Spacewatch | · | 720 m | MPC · JPL |
| 723519 | 2006 WG_{105} | — | November 19, 2006 | Kitt Peak | Spacewatch | · | 1.3 km | MPC · JPL |
| 723520 | 2006 WT_{114} | — | November 20, 2006 | Kitt Peak | Spacewatch | · | 3.0 km | MPC · JPL |
| 723521 | 2006 WV_{120} | — | July 31, 2000 | Cerro Tololo | Deep Ecliptic Survey | · | 2.5 km | MPC · JPL |
| 723522 | 2006 WA_{121} | — | November 16, 2006 | Kitt Peak | Spacewatch | · | 1.7 km | MPC · JPL |
| 723523 | 2006 WA_{122} | — | November 21, 2006 | Mount Lemmon | Mount Lemmon Survey | · | 3.0 km | MPC · JPL |
| 723524 | 2006 WM_{124} | — | November 22, 2006 | Mount Lemmon | Mount Lemmon Survey | · | 1.9 km | MPC · JPL |
| 723525 | 2006 WV_{130} | — | October 22, 2006 | Siding Spring | SSS | BAR | 1.3 km | MPC · JPL |
| 723526 | 2006 WD_{137} | — | November 19, 2006 | Kitt Peak | Spacewatch | · | 780 m | MPC · JPL |
| 723527 | 2006 WQ_{154} | — | November 22, 2006 | Kitt Peak | Spacewatch | · | 1.4 km | MPC · JPL |
| 723528 | 2006 WD_{169} | — | November 11, 2006 | Kitt Peak | Spacewatch | JUN | 970 m | MPC · JPL |
| 723529 | 2006 WW_{172} | — | November 23, 2006 | Kitt Peak | Spacewatch | · | 1.2 km | MPC · JPL |
| 723530 | 2006 WA_{174} | — | November 23, 2006 | Kitt Peak | Spacewatch | AGN | 1.0 km | MPC · JPL |
| 723531 | 2006 WE_{177} | — | November 23, 2006 | Mount Lemmon | Mount Lemmon Survey | · | 2.7 km | MPC · JPL |
| 723532 | 2006 WW_{189} | — | November 25, 2006 | Mount Lemmon | Mount Lemmon Survey | · | 3.7 km | MPC · JPL |
| 723533 | 2006 WJ_{209} | — | November 22, 2006 | Mount Lemmon | Mount Lemmon Survey | NYS | 990 m | MPC · JPL |
| 723534 | 2006 WP_{209} | — | November 18, 2006 | Mount Lemmon | Mount Lemmon Survey | · | 1.3 km | MPC · JPL |
| 723535 | 2006 WK_{213} | — | August 8, 2010 | WISE | WISE | EUP | 3.7 km | MPC · JPL |
| 723536 | 2006 WF_{215} | — | October 23, 2015 | Mount Lemmon | Mount Lemmon Survey | AGN | 1.0 km | MPC · JPL |
| 723537 | 2006 WO_{217} | — | November 21, 2006 | Mount Lemmon | Mount Lemmon Survey | · | 550 m | MPC · JPL |
| 723538 | 2006 WR_{217} | — | November 16, 2006 | Kitt Peak | Spacewatch | · | 1.8 km | MPC · JPL |
| 723539 | 2006 WA_{219} | — | April 4, 2008 | Catalina | CSS | · | 1.6 km | MPC · JPL |
| 723540 | 2006 WF_{219} | — | April 17, 2009 | Kitt Peak | Spacewatch | DOR | 2.3 km | MPC · JPL |
| 723541 | 2006 WW_{219} | — | November 17, 2006 | Mount Lemmon | Mount Lemmon Survey | · | 1.5 km | MPC · JPL |
| 723542 | 2006 WA_{220} | — | November 22, 2006 | Kitt Peak | Spacewatch | · | 1.5 km | MPC · JPL |
| 723543 | 2006 WS_{220} | — | December 16, 2007 | Mount Lemmon | Mount Lemmon Survey | · | 3.0 km | MPC · JPL |
| 723544 | 2006 WF_{221} | — | October 3, 2015 | Mount Lemmon | Mount Lemmon Survey | · | 1.7 km | MPC · JPL |
| 723545 | 2006 WM_{221} | — | May 14, 2009 | Mount Lemmon | Mount Lemmon Survey | · | 1.4 km | MPC · JPL |
| 723546 | 2006 WQ_{222} | — | July 16, 2010 | WISE | WISE | · | 1.1 km | MPC · JPL |
| 723547 | 2006 WK_{223} | — | November 3, 2015 | Haleakala | Pan-STARRS 1 | · | 1.4 km | MPC · JPL |
| 723548 | 2006 WA_{224} | — | November 20, 2006 | Kitt Peak | Spacewatch | · | 850 m | MPC · JPL |
| 723549 | 2006 WP_{224} | — | March 8, 2008 | Mount Lemmon | Mount Lemmon Survey | · | 1.5 km | MPC · JPL |
| 723550 | 2006 WR_{224} | — | October 2, 2015 | Kitt Peak | Spacewatch | HOF | 2.0 km | MPC · JPL |
| 723551 | 2006 WE_{225} | — | February 7, 2008 | Mount Lemmon | Mount Lemmon Survey | HOF | 2.0 km | MPC · JPL |
| 723552 | 2006 WY_{227} | — | September 2, 2010 | Mount Lemmon | Mount Lemmon Survey | · | 1.7 km | MPC · JPL |
| 723553 | 2006 WZ_{227} | — | January 15, 2010 | WISE | WISE | 3:2 | 6.2 km | MPC · JPL |
| 723554 | 2006 WE_{228} | — | February 9, 2008 | Kitt Peak | Spacewatch | · | 1.5 km | MPC · JPL |
| 723555 | 2006 WS_{229} | — | November 16, 2006 | Kitt Peak | Spacewatch | · | 1.6 km | MPC · JPL |
| 723556 | 2006 WJ_{231} | — | November 17, 2006 | Mount Lemmon | Mount Lemmon Survey | · | 1.0 km | MPC · JPL |
| 723557 | 2006 XO_{11} | — | October 23, 2006 | Kitt Peak | Spacewatch | HOF | 2.7 km | MPC · JPL |
| 723558 | 2006 XW_{19} | — | November 16, 2006 | Mount Lemmon | Mount Lemmon Survey | · | 820 m | MPC · JPL |
| 723559 | 2006 XR_{33} | — | December 11, 2006 | Kitt Peak | Spacewatch | · | 3.6 km | MPC · JPL |
| 723560 | 2006 XA_{47} | — | November 19, 2006 | Kitt Peak | Spacewatch | EOS | 1.8 km | MPC · JPL |
| 723561 | 2006 XJ_{52} | — | December 14, 2006 | Socorro | LINEAR | PHO | 990 m | MPC · JPL |
| 723562 | 2006 XU_{52} | — | December 14, 2006 | Socorro | LINEAR | · | 760 m | MPC · JPL |
| 723563 | 2006 XG_{68} | — | October 21, 2006 | Lulin | LUSS | EOS | 1.7 km | MPC · JPL |
| 723564 | 2006 XR_{74} | — | December 15, 2006 | Mount Lemmon | Mount Lemmon Survey | · | 1.4 km | MPC · JPL |
| 723565 | 2006 XL_{75} | — | September 16, 2009 | Kitt Peak | Spacewatch | · | 870 m | MPC · JPL |
| 723566 | 2006 XH_{77} | — | September 12, 2009 | Kitt Peak | Spacewatch | · | 750 m | MPC · JPL |
| 723567 | 2006 XK_{78} | — | December 13, 2006 | Kitt Peak | Spacewatch | · | 3.4 km | MPC · JPL |
| 723568 | 2006 XM_{78} | — | July 8, 2010 | WISE | WISE | · | 2.1 km | MPC · JPL |
| 723569 | 2006 YV_{23} | — | December 21, 2006 | Kitt Peak | Spacewatch | · | 3.8 km | MPC · JPL |
| 723570 | 2006 YU_{25} | — | December 21, 2006 | Kitt Peak | Spacewatch | · | 2.1 km | MPC · JPL |
| 723571 | 2006 YX_{26} | — | December 21, 2006 | Kitt Peak | Spacewatch | NYS | 990 m | MPC · JPL |
| 723572 | 2006 YV_{32} | — | December 21, 2006 | Kitt Peak | Spacewatch | · | 880 m | MPC · JPL |
| 723573 | 2006 YU_{37} | — | December 21, 2006 | Kitt Peak | Spacewatch | · | 1.1 km | MPC · JPL |
| 723574 | 2006 YN_{42} | — | December 15, 2006 | Kitt Peak | Spacewatch | ADE | 1.8 km | MPC · JPL |
| 723575 | 2006 YJ_{43} | — | November 12, 2006 | Mount Lemmon | Mount Lemmon Survey | · | 1.5 km | MPC · JPL |
| 723576 | 2006 YH_{50} | — | November 22, 2006 | Mount Lemmon | Mount Lemmon Survey | · | 2.9 km | MPC · JPL |
| 723577 | 2006 YO_{56} | — | November 22, 2006 | Mount Lemmon | Mount Lemmon Survey | · | 3.1 km | MPC · JPL |
| 723578 | 2006 YT_{57} | — | May 16, 2010 | WISE | WISE | EUP | 3.4 km | MPC · JPL |
| 723579 | 2006 YW_{57} | — | May 28, 2010 | WISE | WISE | EUP | 4.3 km | MPC · JPL |
| 723580 | 2006 YB_{58} | — | May 12, 2010 | WISE | WISE | VER | 2.7 km | MPC · JPL |
| 723581 | 2006 YQ_{59} | — | October 10, 2015 | Haleakala | Pan-STARRS 1 | · | 1.8 km | MPC · JPL |
| 723582 | 2006 YJ_{62} | — | October 17, 2010 | Mount Lemmon | Mount Lemmon Survey | · | 1.4 km | MPC · JPL |
| 723583 | 2006 YN_{62} | — | February 13, 2008 | Kitt Peak | Spacewatch | · | 1.0 km | MPC · JPL |
| 723584 | 2006 YV_{63} | — | December 23, 2006 | Catalina | CSS | · | 800 m | MPC · JPL |
| 723585 | 2006 YH_{65} | — | January 2, 2017 | Haleakala | Pan-STARRS 1 | · | 1.6 km | MPC · JPL |
| 723586 | 2006 YE_{66} | — | December 27, 2006 | Mount Lemmon | Mount Lemmon Survey | · | 3.2 km | MPC · JPL |
| 723587 | 2006 YQ_{67} | — | December 27, 2006 | Mount Lemmon | Mount Lemmon Survey | EOS | 1.7 km | MPC · JPL |
| 723588 | 2006 YK_{70} | — | December 26, 2006 | Kitt Peak | Spacewatch | · | 1.4 km | MPC · JPL |
| 723589 | 2007 AM_{15} | — | October 20, 2005 | Mount Lemmon | Mount Lemmon Survey | · | 2.0 km | MPC · JPL |
| 723590 | 2007 AB_{30} | — | January 9, 2007 | Mount Lemmon | Mount Lemmon Survey | HYG | 2.1 km | MPC · JPL |
| 723591 | 2007 AB_{31} | — | January 10, 2007 | Mount Lemmon | Mount Lemmon Survey | · | 1.6 km | MPC · JPL |
| 723592 | 2007 AK_{33} | — | June 9, 2012 | Mount Lemmon | Mount Lemmon Survey | · | 660 m | MPC · JPL |
| 723593 | 2007 AP_{33} | — | November 4, 2010 | Mount Lemmon | Mount Lemmon Survey | · | 1.7 km | MPC · JPL |
| 723594 | 2007 AK_{35} | — | January 10, 2007 | Kitt Peak | Spacewatch | EOS | 1.4 km | MPC · JPL |
| 723595 | 2007 AX_{36} | — | January 15, 2007 | Mauna Kea | P. A. Wiegert | AST | 1.4 km | MPC · JPL |
| 723596 | 2007 AP_{38} | — | January 10, 2007 | Kitt Peak | Spacewatch | · | 1.0 km | MPC · JPL |
| 723597 | 2007 BU_{9} | — | May 19, 2004 | Kitt Peak | Spacewatch | · | 2.0 km | MPC · JPL |
| 723598 | 2007 BC_{14} | — | December 21, 2006 | Kitt Peak | L. H. Wasserman, M. W. Buie | · | 840 m | MPC · JPL |
| 723599 | 2007 BQ_{15} | — | January 17, 2007 | Kitt Peak | Spacewatch | · | 1.2 km | MPC · JPL |
| 723600 | 2007 BF_{16} | — | January 17, 2007 | Kitt Peak | Spacewatch | · | 1.7 km | MPC · JPL |

== 723601–723700 ==
back to top

| Designation | | | Discovery | | | Properties | | Ref |
| Permanent | Provisional | Named after | Date | Site | Discoverer(s) | Category | Diam. | Ref |
|---|---|---|---|---|---|---|---|---|
| 723601 | 2007 BP_{52} | — | January 24, 2007 | Kitt Peak | Spacewatch | · | 3.3 km | MPC · JPL |
| 723602 | 2007 BE_{68} | — | March 20, 1999 | Apache Point | SDSS Collaboration | MAR | 790 m | MPC · JPL |
| 723603 | 2007 BN_{83} | — | March 21, 1999 | Apache Point | SDSS Collaboration | · | 1.3 km | MPC · JPL |
| 723604 | 2007 BT_{90} | — | February 21, 2007 | Mount Lemmon | Mount Lemmon Survey | · | 2.5 km | MPC · JPL |
| 723605 | 2007 BX_{94} | — | January 19, 2007 | Mauna Kea | P. A. Wiegert | · | 3.0 km | MPC · JPL |
| 723606 | 2007 BR_{95} | — | January 19, 2007 | Mauna Kea | P. A. Wiegert | · | 940 m | MPC · JPL |
| 723607 | 2007 BN_{97} | — | February 23, 2007 | Mount Graham | Trilling, D. E. | · | 2.4 km | MPC · JPL |
| 723608 | 2007 BY_{97} | — | January 9, 2007 | Mount Lemmon | Mount Lemmon Survey | · | 1.6 km | MPC · JPL |
| 723609 | 2007 BF_{99} | — | January 19, 2007 | Mauna Kea | P. A. Wiegert | · | 1.1 km | MPC · JPL |
| 723610 | 2007 BJ_{104} | — | June 26, 2010 | WISE | WISE | LUT | 4.0 km | MPC · JPL |
| 723611 | 2007 BS_{104} | — | September 23, 2009 | Mount Lemmon | Mount Lemmon Survey | · | 1.0 km | MPC · JPL |
| 723612 | 2007 BW_{104} | — | January 27, 2007 | Kitt Peak | Spacewatch | · | 870 m | MPC · JPL |
| 723613 | 2007 BZ_{104} | — | January 27, 2007 | Kitt Peak | Spacewatch | · | 930 m | MPC · JPL |
| 723614 | 2007 BB_{105} | — | January 27, 2007 | Mount Lemmon | Mount Lemmon Survey | V | 490 m | MPC · JPL |
| 723615 | 2007 BM_{105} | — | June 17, 2010 | WISE | WISE | EUP | 3.8 km | MPC · JPL |
| 723616 | 2007 BU_{106} | — | November 9, 2009 | Kitt Peak | Spacewatch | · | 1.0 km | MPC · JPL |
| 723617 | 2007 BZ_{106} | — | January 27, 2007 | Mount Lemmon | Mount Lemmon Survey | MAS | 520 m | MPC · JPL |
| 723618 | 2007 BD_{107} | — | February 25, 2011 | Kitt Peak | Spacewatch | NYS | 950 m | MPC · JPL |
| 723619 | 2007 BC_{109} | — | March 25, 2015 | Haleakala | Pan-STARRS 1 | · | 980 m | MPC · JPL |
| 723620 | 2007 BM_{110} | — | March 13, 2011 | Kitt Peak | Spacewatch | · | 900 m | MPC · JPL |
| 723621 | 2007 BH_{112} | — | July 23, 2010 | WISE | WISE | · | 2.8 km | MPC · JPL |
| 723622 | 2007 BW_{112} | — | September 20, 2014 | Haleakala | Pan-STARRS 1 | · | 1.4 km | MPC · JPL |
| 723623 | 2007 BX_{112} | — | May 1, 2010 | WISE | WISE | ULA | 4.0 km | MPC · JPL |
| 723624 | 2007 BN_{115} | — | January 26, 2007 | Kitt Peak | Spacewatch | · | 940 m | MPC · JPL |
| 723625 | 2007 BA_{116} | — | January 28, 2007 | Kitt Peak | Spacewatch | · | 2.3 km | MPC · JPL |
| 723626 | 2007 BD_{118} | — | January 28, 2007 | Kitt Peak | Spacewatch | · | 2.6 km | MPC · JPL |
| 723627 | 2007 BQ_{119} | — | January 27, 2007 | Mount Lemmon | Mount Lemmon Survey | · | 2.4 km | MPC · JPL |
| 723628 | 2007 CP_{7} | — | February 6, 2007 | Kitt Peak | Spacewatch | · | 2.6 km | MPC · JPL |
| 723629 | 2007 CQ_{29} | — | January 25, 2007 | Kitt Peak | Spacewatch | 615 | 1.1 km | MPC · JPL |
| 723630 | 2007 CC_{38} | — | February 6, 2007 | Mount Lemmon | Mount Lemmon Survey | · | 1.5 km | MPC · JPL |
| 723631 | 2007 CT_{48} | — | February 10, 2007 | Mount Lemmon | Mount Lemmon Survey | 615 | 1.0 km | MPC · JPL |
| 723632 | 2007 CW_{71} | — | February 14, 2007 | Mauna Kea | P. A. Wiegert | · | 1.5 km | MPC · JPL |
| 723633 | 2007 CZ_{74} | — | October 24, 2005 | Kitt Peak | Spacewatch | KOR | 1.0 km | MPC · JPL |
| 723634 | 2007 CF_{81} | — | October 18, 2009 | Mount Lemmon | Mount Lemmon Survey | · | 800 m | MPC · JPL |
| 723635 | 2007 CN_{81} | — | January 26, 2007 | Kitt Peak | Spacewatch | · | 1.6 km | MPC · JPL |
| 723636 | 2007 CK_{82} | — | February 24, 2015 | Haleakala | Pan-STARRS 1 | · | 1.0 km | MPC · JPL |
| 723637 | 2007 DF_{7} | — | January 27, 2007 | Mount Lemmon | Mount Lemmon Survey | · | 2.4 km | MPC · JPL |
| 723638 | 2007 DR_{8} | — | February 17, 2007 | Kitt Peak | Spacewatch | NYS | 710 m | MPC · JPL |
| 723639 | 2007 DE_{11} | — | February 17, 2007 | Mount Lemmon | Mount Lemmon Survey | · | 1.8 km | MPC · JPL |
| 723640 | 2007 DL_{11} | — | February 17, 2007 | Kitt Peak | Spacewatch | · | 1.4 km | MPC · JPL |
| 723641 | 2007 DL_{19} | — | January 28, 2007 | Mount Lemmon | Mount Lemmon Survey | · | 940 m | MPC · JPL |
| 723642 | 2007 DV_{19} | — | February 17, 2007 | Kitt Peak | Spacewatch | · | 2.3 km | MPC · JPL |
| 723643 | 2007 DF_{20} | — | February 17, 2007 | Kitt Peak | Spacewatch | · | 1.8 km | MPC · JPL |
| 723644 | 2007 DR_{25} | — | February 17, 2007 | Kitt Peak | Spacewatch | T_{j} (2.99) | 4.3 km | MPC · JPL |
| 723645 | 2007 DB_{26} | — | February 17, 2007 | Kitt Peak | Spacewatch | · | 1.1 km | MPC · JPL |
| 723646 | 2007 DP_{44} | — | February 17, 2007 | Mount Lemmon | Mount Lemmon Survey | · | 690 m | MPC · JPL |
| 723647 | 2007 DG_{49} | — | February 18, 2007 | Charleston | R. Holmes | · | 2.5 km | MPC · JPL |
| 723648 | 2007 DT_{117} | — | November 22, 2009 | Kitt Peak | Spacewatch | · | 750 m | MPC · JPL |
| 723649 | 2007 DH_{120} | — | February 25, 2007 | Mount Lemmon | Mount Lemmon Survey | L5 | 9.0 km | MPC · JPL |
| 723650 | 2007 DL_{120} | — | August 17, 2012 | Haleakala | Pan-STARRS 1 | · | 990 m | MPC · JPL |
| 723651 | 2007 DP_{120} | — | February 16, 2007 | Mount Lemmon | Mount Lemmon Survey | · | 2.9 km | MPC · JPL |
| 723652 | 2007 DX_{120} | — | February 26, 2007 | Mount Lemmon | Mount Lemmon Survey | · | 1.7 km | MPC · JPL |
| 723653 | 2007 DE_{121} | — | September 5, 2008 | Kitt Peak | Spacewatch | · | 710 m | MPC · JPL |
| 723654 | 2007 DK_{121} | — | February 17, 2007 | Kitt Peak | Spacewatch | HOF | 2.0 km | MPC · JPL |
| 723655 | 2007 DK_{126} | — | May 9, 2010 | WISE | WISE | · | 3.9 km | MPC · JPL |
| 723656 | 2007 DH_{127} | — | February 21, 2007 | Catalina | CSS | · | 1.3 km | MPC · JPL |
| 723657 | 2007 DK_{127} | — | February 21, 2007 | Mount Lemmon | Mount Lemmon Survey | L5 | 8.9 km | MPC · JPL |
| 723658 | 2007 DW_{128} | — | February 23, 2007 | Mount Lemmon | Mount Lemmon Survey | · | 960 m | MPC · JPL |
| 723659 | 2007 DV_{132} | — | February 17, 2007 | Kitt Peak | Spacewatch | · | 890 m | MPC · JPL |
| 723660 | 2007 DC_{133} | — | February 26, 2007 | Mount Lemmon | Mount Lemmon Survey | NYS | 970 m | MPC · JPL |
| 723661 | 2007 ES | — | March 9, 2007 | Kitt Peak | Spacewatch | APO | 850 m | MPC · JPL |
| 723662 | 2007 EC_{27} | — | March 11, 2007 | Altschwendt | W. Ries | · | 1.9 km | MPC · JPL |
| 723663 | 2007 EK_{44} | — | February 23, 2007 | Kitt Peak | Spacewatch | · | 1.0 km | MPC · JPL |
| 723664 | 2007 ET_{44} | — | January 28, 2007 | Kitt Peak | Spacewatch | · | 2.4 km | MPC · JPL |
| 723665 | 2007 EM_{65} | — | September 30, 2005 | Mount Lemmon | Mount Lemmon Survey | · | 2.8 km | MPC · JPL |
| 723666 | 2007 EQ_{66} | — | March 10, 2007 | Kitt Peak | Spacewatch | · | 1.0 km | MPC · JPL |
| 723667 | 2007 EC_{68} | — | March 10, 2007 | Kitt Peak | Spacewatch | · | 1.4 km | MPC · JPL |
| 723668 | 2007 EM_{84} | — | March 12, 2007 | Mount Lemmon | Mount Lemmon Survey | · | 2.2 km | MPC · JPL |
| 723669 | 2007 EK_{86} | — | March 12, 2007 | Kitt Peak | Spacewatch | L5 | 6.9 km | MPC · JPL |
| 723670 | 2007 EG_{107} | — | May 4, 1994 | Kitt Peak | Spacewatch | · | 1.9 km | MPC · JPL |
| 723671 | 2007 ES_{109} | — | March 23, 2003 | Apache Point | SDSS Collaboration | NYS | 1.2 km | MPC · JPL |
| 723672 | 2007 EB_{116} | — | March 13, 2007 | Mount Lemmon | Mount Lemmon Survey | NYS | 1.0 km | MPC · JPL |
| 723673 | 2007 ER_{116} | — | March 13, 2007 | Mount Lemmon | Mount Lemmon Survey | · | 1.0 km | MPC · JPL |
| 723674 | 2007 EQ_{118} | — | January 30, 2003 | Kitt Peak | Spacewatch | NYS | 1.0 km | MPC · JPL |
| 723675 | 2007 EG_{121} | — | February 25, 2007 | Mount Lemmon | Mount Lemmon Survey | MAS | 560 m | MPC · JPL |
| 723676 | 2007 EC_{123} | — | February 18, 2001 | Haleakala | NEAT | · | 5.3 km | MPC · JPL |
| 723677 | 2007 EQ_{140} | — | March 12, 2007 | Kitt Peak | Spacewatch | · | 1.7 km | MPC · JPL |
| 723678 | 2007 EJ_{145} | — | February 26, 2007 | Mount Lemmon | Mount Lemmon Survey | · | 1.7 km | MPC · JPL |
| 723679 | 2007 EN_{146} | — | March 12, 2007 | Mount Lemmon | Mount Lemmon Survey | NYS | 970 m | MPC · JPL |
| 723680 | 2007 EO_{148} | — | March 12, 2007 | Mount Lemmon | Mount Lemmon Survey | · | 1.5 km | MPC · JPL |
| 723681 | 2007 ET_{149} | — | March 12, 2007 | Mount Lemmon | Mount Lemmon Survey | L5 | 9.1 km | MPC · JPL |
| 723682 | 2007 EL_{158} | — | January 27, 2007 | Mount Lemmon | Mount Lemmon Survey | NYS | 860 m | MPC · JPL |
| 723683 | 2007 EY_{160} | — | March 14, 2007 | Mount Lemmon | Mount Lemmon Survey | · | 1.2 km | MPC · JPL |
| 723684 | 2007 EN_{163} | — | February 1, 1995 | Kitt Peak | Spacewatch | · | 2.5 km | MPC · JPL |
| 723685 | 2007 EH_{164} | — | March 15, 2007 | Mount Lemmon | Mount Lemmon Survey | SYL | 3.7 km | MPC · JPL |
| 723686 | 2007 EQ_{179} | — | October 13, 1999 | Apache Point | SDSS Collaboration | · | 2.3 km | MPC · JPL |
| 723687 | 2007 EX_{185} | — | March 15, 2007 | Mount Lemmon | Mount Lemmon Survey | · | 1.3 km | MPC · JPL |
| 723688 | 2007 EU_{186} | — | March 15, 2007 | Mount Lemmon | Mount Lemmon Survey | · | 1.5 km | MPC · JPL |
| 723689 | 2007 EO_{189} | — | December 28, 2002 | Kitt Peak | Spacewatch | NYS | 760 m | MPC · JPL |
| 723690 | 2007 EP_{197} | — | March 15, 2007 | Kitt Peak | Spacewatch | · | 1.6 km | MPC · JPL |
| 723691 | 2007 EZ_{200} | — | February 26, 2007 | Mount Lemmon | Mount Lemmon Survey | GEF | 970 m | MPC · JPL |
| 723692 | 2007 EO_{206} | — | March 13, 2007 | Catalina | CSS | · | 3.0 km | MPC · JPL |
| 723693 | 2007 ET_{212} | — | April 30, 2003 | Kitt Peak | Spacewatch | · | 1.6 km | MPC · JPL |
| 723694 | 2007 EV_{227} | — | March 14, 2007 | Kitt Peak | Spacewatch | L5 · (291316) | 9.0 km | MPC · JPL |
| 723695 | 2007 EM_{228} | — | September 27, 2009 | Kitt Peak | Spacewatch | · | 1.6 km | MPC · JPL |
| 723696 | 2007 EU_{228} | — | September 27, 2009 | Kitt Peak | Spacewatch | · | 1.1 km | MPC · JPL |
| 723697 | 2007 EZ_{228} | — | June 6, 2014 | Haleakala | Pan-STARRS 1 | · | 560 m | MPC · JPL |
| 723698 | 2007 EC_{229} | — | August 2, 2016 | Haleakala | Pan-STARRS 1 | · | 2.3 km | MPC · JPL |
| 723699 | 2007 EG_{229} | — | August 28, 2014 | Haleakala | Pan-STARRS 1 | · | 2.0 km | MPC · JPL |
| 723700 | 2007 EC_{231} | — | March 10, 2007 | Mount Lemmon | Mount Lemmon Survey | · | 1.4 km | MPC · JPL |

== 723701–723800 ==
back to top

| Designation | | | Discovery | | | Properties | | Ref |
| Permanent | Provisional | Named after | Date | Site | Discoverer(s) | Category | Diam. | Ref |
|---|---|---|---|---|---|---|---|---|
| 723701 | 2007 ED_{231} | — | March 15, 2007 | Kitt Peak | Spacewatch | L5 | 7.1 km | MPC · JPL |
| 723702 | 2007 EG_{231} | — | March 13, 2007 | Mount Lemmon | Mount Lemmon Survey | L5 | 8.0 km | MPC · JPL |
| 723703 | 2007 EQ_{232} | — | November 10, 2009 | Mount Lemmon | Mount Lemmon Survey | NYS | 870 m | MPC · JPL |
| 723704 | 2007 EZ_{232} | — | October 2, 2013 | Kitt Peak | Spacewatch | MAS | 700 m | MPC · JPL |
| 723705 | 2007 EF_{234} | — | March 10, 2007 | Mount Lemmon | Mount Lemmon Survey | · | 990 m | MPC · JPL |
| 723706 | 2007 EW_{234} | — | July 30, 2010 | WISE | WISE | · | 2.6 km | MPC · JPL |
| 723707 | 2007 EG_{236} | — | May 1, 2011 | Haleakala | Pan-STARRS 1 | V | 480 m | MPC · JPL |
| 723708 | 2007 EK_{236} | — | March 17, 2012 | Mount Lemmon | Mount Lemmon Survey | · | 1.5 km | MPC · JPL |
| 723709 | 2007 EZ_{236} | — | March 28, 2012 | Mount Lemmon | Mount Lemmon Survey | · | 1.4 km | MPC · JPL |
| 723710 | 2007 EP_{238} | — | March 10, 2007 | Mount Lemmon | Mount Lemmon Survey | KOR | 1.1 km | MPC · JPL |
| 723711 | 2007 ET_{239} | — | March 13, 2007 | Mount Lemmon | Mount Lemmon Survey | L5 | 6.5 km | MPC · JPL |
| 723712 | 2007 EO_{241} | — | March 12, 2007 | Mount Lemmon | Mount Lemmon Survey | L5 | 7.7 km | MPC · JPL |
| 723713 | 2007 FW | — | September 26, 2005 | Kitt Peak | Spacewatch | H | 420 m | MPC · JPL |
| 723714 | 2007 FT_{4} | — | March 16, 2007 | Kitt Peak | Spacewatch | · | 1.3 km | MPC · JPL |
| 723715 | 2007 FE_{22} | — | March 20, 2007 | Kitt Peak | Spacewatch | · | 1.8 km | MPC · JPL |
| 723716 | 2007 FK_{28} | — | March 13, 2007 | Mount Lemmon | Mount Lemmon Survey | (2076) | 650 m | MPC · JPL |
| 723717 | 2007 FQ_{33} | — | March 16, 2007 | Mount Lemmon | Mount Lemmon Survey | EOS | 1.4 km | MPC · JPL |
| 723718 | 2007 FN_{41} | — | March 26, 2007 | Mount Lemmon | Mount Lemmon Survey | · | 1.4 km | MPC · JPL |
| 723719 | 2007 FB_{49} | — | March 26, 2007 | Mount Lemmon | Mount Lemmon Survey | · | 1.3 km | MPC · JPL |
| 723720 | 2007 FX_{50} | — | April 23, 2011 | Haleakala | Pan-STARRS 1 | · | 1.0 km | MPC · JPL |
| 723721 | 2007 FX_{52} | — | March 12, 2007 | Catalina | CSS | · | 2.5 km | MPC · JPL |
| 723722 | 2007 FO_{53} | — | November 12, 2010 | Mount Lemmon | Mount Lemmon Survey | · | 2.7 km | MPC · JPL |
| 723723 | 2007 FR_{53} | — | January 17, 2013 | Kitt Peak | Spacewatch | · | 3.3 km | MPC · JPL |
| 723724 | 2007 FY_{53} | — | August 26, 2014 | Haleakala | Pan-STARRS 1 | EOS | 1.8 km | MPC · JPL |
| 723725 | 2007 FR_{54} | — | March 16, 2007 | Kitt Peak | Spacewatch | · | 1.0 km | MPC · JPL |
| 723726 | 2007 FE_{55} | — | September 24, 2012 | Mount Lemmon | Mount Lemmon Survey | · | 1.2 km | MPC · JPL |
| 723727 | 2007 FC_{56} | — | March 16, 2007 | Mount Lemmon | Mount Lemmon Survey | · | 1.7 km | MPC · JPL |
| 723728 | 2007 FO_{57} | — | March 29, 2012 | Mount Lemmon | Mount Lemmon Survey | · | 2.0 km | MPC · JPL |
| 723729 | 2007 FK_{58} | — | June 16, 2010 | WISE | WISE | · | 2.7 km | MPC · JPL |
| 723730 | 2007 FX_{58} | — | March 25, 2007 | Mount Lemmon | Mount Lemmon Survey | · | 1.6 km | MPC · JPL |
| 723731 | 2007 FB_{62} | — | March 16, 2007 | Mount Lemmon | Mount Lemmon Survey | · | 1.5 km | MPC · JPL |
| 723732 | 2007 GD_{2} | — | April 10, 2007 | Altschwendt | W. Ries | · | 2.0 km | MPC · JPL |
| 723733 | 2007 GV_{10} | — | March 10, 2007 | Kitt Peak | Spacewatch | · | 1.1 km | MPC · JPL |
| 723734 | 2007 GB_{12} | — | March 11, 2007 | Kitt Peak | Spacewatch | · | 3.6 km | MPC · JPL |
| 723735 | 2007 GL_{19} | — | April 11, 2007 | Kitt Peak | Spacewatch | · | 870 m | MPC · JPL |
| 723736 | 2007 GE_{31} | — | April 14, 2007 | Mount Lemmon | Mount Lemmon Survey | H | 410 m | MPC · JPL |
| 723737 | 2007 GU_{42} | — | April 14, 2007 | Kitt Peak | Spacewatch | · | 1.6 km | MPC · JPL |
| 723738 | 2007 GK_{52} | — | April 14, 2007 | Kitt Peak | Spacewatch | · | 820 m | MPC · JPL |
| 723739 | 2007 GE_{53} | — | March 26, 2007 | Mount Lemmon | Mount Lemmon Survey | · | 1.2 km | MPC · JPL |
| 723740 | 2007 GC_{79} | — | May 15, 2018 | Mount Lemmon | Mount Lemmon Survey | · | 2.1 km | MPC · JPL |
| 723741 | 2007 GC_{81} | — | April 15, 2007 | Kitt Peak | Spacewatch | · | 1.2 km | MPC · JPL |
| 723742 | 2007 GT_{81} | — | April 15, 2007 | Mount Lemmon | Mount Lemmon Survey | · | 530 m | MPC · JPL |
| 723743 | 2007 GX_{81} | — | April 7, 2007 | Mount Lemmon | Mount Lemmon Survey | MAS | 570 m | MPC · JPL |
| 723744 | 2007 HF_{8} | — | April 18, 2007 | Mount Lemmon | Mount Lemmon Survey | WIT | 690 m | MPC · JPL |
| 723745 | 2007 HW_{9} | — | April 18, 2007 | Mount Lemmon | Mount Lemmon Survey | · | 1.1 km | MPC · JPL |
| 723746 | 2007 HL_{11} | — | April 18, 2007 | Kitt Peak | Spacewatch | · | 4.0 km | MPC · JPL |
| 723747 | 2007 HO_{11} | — | April 18, 2007 | Mount Lemmon | Mount Lemmon Survey | · | 1.9 km | MPC · JPL |
| 723748 | 2007 HC_{34} | — | April 19, 2007 | Kitt Peak | Spacewatch | · | 2.8 km | MPC · JPL |
| 723749 | 2007 HT_{34} | — | November 1, 2000 | Kitt Peak | Spacewatch | · | 1.8 km | MPC · JPL |
| 723750 | 2007 HZ_{36} | — | April 19, 2007 | Kitt Peak | Spacewatch | · | 880 m | MPC · JPL |
| 723751 | 2007 HL_{43} | — | April 22, 2007 | Mount Lemmon | Mount Lemmon Survey | VER | 2.5 km | MPC · JPL |
| 723752 | 2007 HC_{46} | — | March 26, 2007 | Kitt Peak | Spacewatch | · | 2.4 km | MPC · JPL |
| 723753 | 2007 HJ_{46} | — | April 20, 2007 | Kitt Peak | Spacewatch | · | 1.0 km | MPC · JPL |
| 723754 | 2007 HM_{50} | — | April 14, 2007 | Kitt Peak | Spacewatch | · | 1.8 km | MPC · JPL |
| 723755 | 2007 HR_{54} | — | February 22, 2003 | Palomar | NEAT | · | 1.0 km | MPC · JPL |
| 723756 | 2007 HA_{57} | — | April 22, 2007 | Mount Lemmon | Mount Lemmon Survey | ADE | 1.8 km | MPC · JPL |
| 723757 | 2007 HT_{65} | — | March 11, 2007 | Mount Lemmon | Mount Lemmon Survey | · | 1.6 km | MPC · JPL |
| 723758 | 2007 HM_{78} | — | July 8, 2003 | Kitt Peak | Spacewatch | EOS | 2.8 km | MPC · JPL |
| 723759 | 2007 HK_{81} | — | April 25, 2007 | Mount Lemmon | Mount Lemmon Survey | · | 810 m | MPC · JPL |
| 723760 | 2007 HX_{84} | — | March 16, 2007 | Mount Lemmon | Mount Lemmon Survey | · | 1.5 km | MPC · JPL |
| 723761 | 2007 HF_{100} | — | April 24, 2007 | Mount Lemmon | Mount Lemmon Survey | EOS | 1.6 km | MPC · JPL |
| 723762 | 2007 HO_{102} | — | October 18, 2014 | Mount Lemmon | Mount Lemmon Survey | EOS | 1.3 km | MPC · JPL |
| 723763 | 2007 HB_{105} | — | October 2, 2014 | Haleakala | Pan-STARRS 1 | EOS | 1.4 km | MPC · JPL |
| 723764 | 2007 HM_{105} | — | October 25, 2009 | Kitt Peak | Spacewatch | · | 1.7 km | MPC · JPL |
| 723765 | 2007 HT_{105} | — | March 28, 2012 | Mount Lemmon | Mount Lemmon Survey | · | 1.7 km | MPC · JPL |
| 723766 | 2007 HR_{107} | — | April 22, 2007 | Mount Lemmon | Mount Lemmon Survey | · | 940 m | MPC · JPL |
| 723767 | 2007 HK_{109} | — | October 29, 2014 | Haleakala | Pan-STARRS 1 | · | 1.8 km | MPC · JPL |
| 723768 | 2007 HN_{109} | — | September 19, 1998 | Apache Point | SDSS Collaboration | · | 2.2 km | MPC · JPL |
| 723769 | 2007 HE_{110} | — | April 23, 2007 | Kitt Peak | Spacewatch | · | 1.8 km | MPC · JPL |
| 723770 | 2007 HA_{112} | — | April 24, 2007 | Kitt Peak | Spacewatch | · | 1.1 km | MPC · JPL |
| 723771 | 2007 HL_{112} | — | April 19, 2007 | Kitt Peak | Spacewatch | · | 850 m | MPC · JPL |
| 723772 | 2007 HN_{114} | — | April 22, 2007 | Kitt Peak | Spacewatch | · | 990 m | MPC · JPL |
| 723773 | 2007 JE_{6} | — | May 9, 2007 | Mount Lemmon | Mount Lemmon Survey | · | 1.3 km | MPC · JPL |
| 723774 | 2007 JD_{7} | — | May 9, 2007 | Mount Lemmon | Mount Lemmon Survey | · | 750 m | MPC · JPL |
| 723775 | 2007 JO_{7} | — | January 23, 2006 | Kitt Peak | Spacewatch | KOR | 1.3 km | MPC · JPL |
| 723776 | 2007 JO_{8} | — | May 9, 2007 | Mount Lemmon | Mount Lemmon Survey | · | 1.5 km | MPC · JPL |
| 723777 | 2007 JK_{18} | — | May 9, 2007 | Kitt Peak | Spacewatch | PHO | 750 m | MPC · JPL |
| 723778 | 2007 JG_{26} | — | May 9, 2007 | Kitt Peak | Spacewatch | · | 1.1 km | MPC · JPL |
| 723779 | 2007 JX_{31} | — | May 12, 2007 | Mount Lemmon | Mount Lemmon Survey | · | 2.3 km | MPC · JPL |
| 723780 | 2007 JY_{32} | — | May 12, 2007 | Mount Lemmon | Mount Lemmon Survey | · | 770 m | MPC · JPL |
| 723781 | 2007 JX_{36} | — | May 9, 2007 | Mount Lemmon | Mount Lemmon Survey | · | 630 m | MPC · JPL |
| 723782 | 2007 JA_{41} | — | May 13, 2007 | Mount Lemmon | Mount Lemmon Survey | · | 2.7 km | MPC · JPL |
| 723783 | 2007 JE_{47} | — | May 12, 2007 | Mount Lemmon | Mount Lemmon Survey | · | 900 m | MPC · JPL |
| 723784 | 2007 JY_{48} | — | April 27, 2012 | Haleakala | Pan-STARRS 1 | · | 1.7 km | MPC · JPL |
| 723785 | 2007 JE_{50} | — | May 7, 2010 | WISE | WISE | KON | 2.3 km | MPC · JPL |
| 723786 | 2007 JA_{51} | — | October 1, 2014 | Haleakala | Pan-STARRS 1 | EOS | 1.5 km | MPC · JPL |
| 723787 | 2007 KT_{1} | — | October 22, 2003 | Apache Point | SDSS Collaboration | · | 2.0 km | MPC · JPL |
| 723788 | 2007 KM_{2} | — | May 19, 2007 | Tiki | Teamo, N., S. F. Hönig | · | 840 m | MPC · JPL |
| 723789 | 2007 KD_{10} | — | March 29, 2012 | Haleakala | Pan-STARRS 1 | EOS | 1.4 km | MPC · JPL |
| 723790 | 2007 KV_{10} | — | October 28, 2014 | Haleakala | Pan-STARRS 1 | EOS | 1.4 km | MPC · JPL |
| 723791 | 2007 KW_{10} | — | November 21, 2008 | Kitt Peak | Spacewatch | · | 820 m | MPC · JPL |
| 723792 | 2007 KX_{10} | — | October 15, 2012 | Haleakala | Pan-STARRS 1 | L5 | 8.6 km | MPC · JPL |
| 723793 | 2007 KO_{11} | — | April 19, 2017 | Mount Lemmon | Mount Lemmon Survey | · | 1.6 km | MPC · JPL |
| 723794 | 2007 LZ_{1} | — | June 7, 2007 | Kitt Peak | Spacewatch | · | 1.1 km | MPC · JPL |
| 723795 | 2007 LK_{14} | — | May 12, 2007 | Mount Lemmon | Mount Lemmon Survey | · | 2.9 km | MPC · JPL |
| 723796 | 2007 LA_{18} | — | October 29, 2003 | Kitt Peak | Spacewatch | · | 3.0 km | MPC · JPL |
| 723797 | 2007 LE_{18} | — | June 13, 2007 | Kitt Peak | Spacewatch | THM | 2.1 km | MPC · JPL |
| 723798 | 2007 LA_{30} | — | June 11, 2007 | Mauna Kea | D. D. Balam, K. M. Perrett | · | 820 m | MPC · JPL |
| 723799 | 2007 LL_{30} | — | June 11, 2007 | Mauna Kea | D. D. Balam, K. M. Perrett | EOS | 1.5 km | MPC · JPL |
| 723800 | 2007 LD_{31} | — | June 12, 2007 | Mauna Kea | D. D. Balam, K. M. Perrett | (5) | 850 m | MPC · JPL |

== 723801–723900 ==
back to top

| Designation | | | Discovery | | | Properties | | Ref |
| Permanent | Provisional | Named after | Date | Site | Discoverer(s) | Category | Diam. | Ref |
|---|---|---|---|---|---|---|---|---|
| 723801 | 2007 LN_{34} | — | April 23, 2007 | Mount Lemmon | Mount Lemmon Survey | · | 2.5 km | MPC · JPL |
| 723802 | 2007 LL_{35} | — | June 9, 2007 | Kitt Peak | Spacewatch | · | 2.8 km | MPC · JPL |
| 723803 | 2007 LP_{35} | — | January 26, 2006 | Kitt Peak | Spacewatch | LIX | 2.6 km | MPC · JPL |
| 723804 | 2007 LO_{38} | — | November 17, 2009 | Catalina | CSS | · | 2.6 km | MPC · JPL |
| 723805 | 2007 LY_{38} | — | June 14, 2007 | Kitt Peak | Spacewatch | · | 3.8 km | MPC · JPL |
| 723806 | 2007 LL_{39} | — | December 1, 2015 | Haleakala | Pan-STARRS 1 | V | 510 m | MPC · JPL |
| 723807 | 2007 LV_{39} | — | June 9, 2007 | Kitt Peak | Spacewatch | · | 2.6 km | MPC · JPL |
| 723808 | 2007 ML_{5} | — | June 17, 2007 | Kitt Peak | Spacewatch | PHO | 1.0 km | MPC · JPL |
| 723809 | 2007 MQ_{7} | — | April 19, 2007 | Mount Lemmon | Mount Lemmon Survey | · | 2.2 km | MPC · JPL |
| 723810 | 2007 MU_{11} | — | June 21, 2007 | Mount Lemmon | Mount Lemmon Survey | · | 4.1 km | MPC · JPL |
| 723811 | 2007 MA_{12} | — | June 21, 2007 | Mount Lemmon | Mount Lemmon Survey | · | 3.6 km | MPC · JPL |
| 723812 | 2007 ML_{18} | — | June 21, 2007 | Mount Lemmon | Mount Lemmon Survey | · | 2.8 km | MPC · JPL |
| 723813 | 2007 MF_{19} | — | June 21, 2007 | Mount Lemmon | Mount Lemmon Survey | · | 930 m | MPC · JPL |
| 723814 | 2007 MQ_{21} | — | June 21, 2007 | Mount Lemmon | Mount Lemmon Survey | · | 2.6 km | MPC · JPL |
| 723815 | 2007 MO_{23} | — | June 22, 2007 | Kitt Peak | Spacewatch | · | 1.6 km | MPC · JPL |
| 723816 | 2007 MF_{26} | — | September 18, 2003 | Palomar | NEAT | · | 3.8 km | MPC · JPL |
| 723817 | 2007 MG_{28} | — | September 6, 2013 | Kitt Peak | Spacewatch | · | 2.0 km | MPC · JPL |
| 723818 | 2007 MW_{28} | — | October 24, 2003 | Anderson Mesa | LONEOS | · | 3.2 km | MPC · JPL |
| 723819 | 2007 ME_{29} | — | December 7, 2013 | Haleakala | Pan-STARRS 1 | · | 900 m | MPC · JPL |
| 723820 | 2007 MS_{29} | — | June 18, 2018 | Haleakala | Pan-STARRS 1 | · | 1.9 km | MPC · JPL |
| 723821 | 2007 NJ_{1} | — | December 30, 2005 | Kitt Peak | Spacewatch | · | 1.1 km | MPC · JPL |
| 723822 | 2007 NH_{7} | — | July 15, 2007 | Cerro Burek | I. de la Cueva | · | 3.2 km | MPC · JPL |
| 723823 | 2007 NR_{7} | — | July 10, 2007 | Siding Spring | SSS | · | 1.4 km | MPC · JPL |
| 723824 | 2007 NS_{7} | — | January 16, 2009 | Mount Lemmon | Mount Lemmon Survey | MAR | 1.1 km | MPC · JPL |
| 723825 | 2007 OZ_{2} | — | January 31, 2006 | Kitt Peak | Spacewatch | · | 1.4 km | MPC · JPL |
| 723826 | 2007 OE_{6} | — | July 22, 2007 | Lulin | LUSS | · | 770 m | MPC · JPL |
| 723827 | 2007 OZ_{7} | — | July 23, 2007 | Charleston | R. Holmes | · | 1.7 km | MPC · JPL |
| 723828 | 2007 OF_{12} | — | July 24, 2007 | Lulin | LUSS | · | 1.6 km | MPC · JPL |
| 723829 | 2007 PG_{4} | — | June 10, 2007 | Siding Spring | SSS | · | 1.8 km | MPC · JPL |
| 723830 | 2007 PP_{30} | — | July 25, 2007 | Lulin | LUSS | · | 2.4 km | MPC · JPL |
| 723831 | 2007 PK_{41} | — | July 21, 2007 | La Sagra | OAM | · | 2.0 km | MPC · JPL |
| 723832 | 2007 PN_{51} | — | March 12, 2010 | Kitt Peak | Spacewatch | MAS | 590 m | MPC · JPL |
| 723833 | 2007 PO_{51} | — | September 4, 2013 | Calar Alto | F. Hormuth | · | 2.3 km | MPC · JPL |
| 723834 | 2007 PH_{52} | — | April 3, 2017 | Haleakala | Pan-STARRS 1 | · | 2.7 km | MPC · JPL |
| 723835 | 2007 PN_{52} | — | June 17, 2018 | Haleakala | Pan-STARRS 1 | VER | 2.4 km | MPC · JPL |
| 723836 | 2007 PP_{52} | — | June 24, 2010 | WISE | WISE | · | 1.0 km | MPC · JPL |
| 723837 | 2007 PR_{52} | — | August 10, 2007 | Kitt Peak | Spacewatch | EOS | 1.6 km | MPC · JPL |
| 723838 | 2007 PV_{52} | — | June 2, 2010 | WISE | WISE | · | 1.4 km | MPC · JPL |
| 723839 | 2007 QB | — | August 16, 2007 | Črni Vrh | Skvarč, J. | · | 1.2 km | MPC · JPL |
| 723840 | 2007 QX_{1} | — | August 21, 2007 | Bisei | BATTeRS | · | 3.6 km | MPC · JPL |
| 723841 | 2007 QD_{2} | — | July 18, 2007 | Mount Lemmon | Mount Lemmon Survey | · | 2.8 km | MPC · JPL |
| 723842 | 2007 QV_{3} | — | August 25, 2007 | Gaisberg | Gierlinger, R. | TIR | 2.3 km | MPC · JPL |
| 723843 | 2007 QR_{11} | — | August 10, 2007 | Kitt Peak | Spacewatch | EOS | 1.6 km | MPC · JPL |
| 723844 | 2007 QM_{17} | — | August 24, 2007 | Kitt Peak | Spacewatch | EUN | 930 m | MPC · JPL |
| 723845 | 2007 QJ_{18} | — | January 17, 2016 | Haleakala | Pan-STARRS 1 | · | 2.7 km | MPC · JPL |
| 723846 | 2007 QT_{18} | — | August 21, 2007 | Anderson Mesa | LONEOS | KON | 2.3 km | MPC · JPL |
| 723847 | 2007 RU_{2} | — | September 3, 2007 | Mount Lemmon | Mount Lemmon Survey | · | 2.8 km | MPC · JPL |
| 723848 | 2007 RU_{5} | — | September 5, 2007 | Dauban | C. Rinner, Kugel, F. | EUN | 1.6 km | MPC · JPL |
| 723849 | 2007 RP_{6} | — | September 3, 2007 | Goodricke-Pigott | R. A. Tucker | · | 770 m | MPC · JPL |
| 723850 | 2007 RB_{9} | — | September 5, 2007 | Siding Spring | K. Sárneczky, L. Kiss | · | 1.2 km | MPC · JPL |
| 723851 | 2007 RZ_{10} | — | September 14, 2007 | Mount Lemmon | Mount Lemmon Survey | MAS | 690 m | MPC · JPL |
| 723852 | 2007 RW_{11} | — | September 11, 2007 | Kitt Peak | Spacewatch | MAS | 630 m | MPC · JPL |
| 723853 | 2007 RA_{12} | — | September 11, 2007 | Mount Lemmon | Mount Lemmon Survey | · | 1.1 km | MPC · JPL |
| 723854 | 2007 RF_{19} | — | September 2, 2007 | Siding Spring | K. Sárneczky, L. Kiss | · | 2.6 km | MPC · JPL |
| 723855 | 2007 RZ_{24} | — | August 23, 2007 | Kitt Peak | Spacewatch | · | 3.0 km | MPC · JPL |
| 723856 | 2007 RN_{40} | — | September 9, 2007 | Kitt Peak | Spacewatch | · | 2.4 km | MPC · JPL |
| 723857 | 2007 RM_{48} | — | September 9, 2007 | Mount Lemmon | Mount Lemmon Survey | MAR | 750 m | MPC · JPL |
| 723858 | 2007 RA_{64} | — | August 10, 2007 | Kitt Peak | Spacewatch | · | 1.4 km | MPC · JPL |
| 723859 | 2007 RG_{66} | — | August 24, 2007 | Kitt Peak | Spacewatch | · | 2.5 km | MPC · JPL |
| 723860 | 2007 RM_{71} | — | September 10, 2007 | Kitt Peak | Spacewatch | · | 1.3 km | MPC · JPL |
| 723861 | 2007 RJ_{76} | — | August 10, 2007 | Kitt Peak | Spacewatch | · | 1.3 km | MPC · JPL |
| 723862 | 2007 RH_{81} | — | September 10, 2007 | Mount Lemmon | Mount Lemmon Survey | HNS | 840 m | MPC · JPL |
| 723863 | 2007 RQ_{86} | — | September 10, 2007 | Mount Lemmon | Mount Lemmon Survey | THM | 1.8 km | MPC · JPL |
| 723864 | 2007 RT_{103} | — | August 14, 2001 | Haleakala | NEAT | · | 2.6 km | MPC · JPL |
| 723865 | 2007 RS_{115} | — | September 11, 2007 | Kitt Peak | Spacewatch | HOF | 2.0 km | MPC · JPL |
| 723866 | 2007 RX_{115} | — | September 11, 2007 | Kitt Peak | Spacewatch | · | 2.3 km | MPC · JPL |
| 723867 | 2007 RF_{120} | — | September 13, 2007 | Catalina | CSS | · | 2.7 km | MPC · JPL |
| 723868 | 2007 RP_{120} | — | September 26, 2003 | Apache Point | SDSS Collaboration | · | 1.1 km | MPC · JPL |
| 723869 | 2007 RO_{121} | — | March 8, 2005 | Mount Lemmon | Mount Lemmon Survey | · | 2.3 km | MPC · JPL |
| 723870 | 2007 RM_{123} | — | September 12, 2007 | Mount Lemmon | Mount Lemmon Survey | MAS | 580 m | MPC · JPL |
| 723871 | 2007 RH_{125} | — | September 12, 2007 | Kitt Peak | Spacewatch | · | 960 m | MPC · JPL |
| 723872 | 2007 RH_{126} | — | September 12, 2007 | Mount Lemmon | Mount Lemmon Survey | · | 2.4 km | MPC · JPL |
| 723873 | 2007 RZ_{128} | — | September 12, 2007 | Mount Lemmon | Mount Lemmon Survey | · | 1.1 km | MPC · JPL |
| 723874 | 2007 RQ_{129} | — | September 12, 2007 | Mount Lemmon | Mount Lemmon Survey | · | 1.2 km | MPC · JPL |
| 723875 | 2007 RG_{136} | — | August 24, 2007 | Kitt Peak | Spacewatch | THM | 1.7 km | MPC · JPL |
| 723876 | 2007 RX_{136} | — | September 14, 2007 | Mount Lemmon | Mount Lemmon Survey | · | 960 m | MPC · JPL |
| 723877 | 2007 RE_{150} | — | September 13, 2007 | Catalina | CSS | ADE | 1.8 km | MPC · JPL |
| 723878 | 2007 RY_{150} | — | September 9, 2007 | Anderson Mesa | LONEOS | · | 1.3 km | MPC · JPL |
| 723879 | 2007 RW_{152} | — | September 10, 2007 | Kitt Peak | Spacewatch | · | 1.9 km | MPC · JPL |
| 723880 | 2007 RZ_{152} | — | September 10, 2007 | Kitt Peak | Spacewatch | · | 2.1 km | MPC · JPL |
| 723881 | 2007 RY_{154} | — | September 10, 2007 | Mount Lemmon | Mount Lemmon Survey | · | 1.8 km | MPC · JPL |
| 723882 | 2007 RX_{164} | — | September 10, 2007 | Kitt Peak | Spacewatch | (5) | 1.1 km | MPC · JPL |
| 723883 | 2007 RE_{169} | — | September 10, 2007 | Kitt Peak | Spacewatch | · | 2.0 km | MPC · JPL |
| 723884 | 2007 RF_{169} | — | October 19, 1995 | Kitt Peak | Spacewatch | · | 1.1 km | MPC · JPL |
| 723885 | 2007 RY_{176} | — | September 10, 2007 | Mount Lemmon | Mount Lemmon Survey | · | 2.6 km | MPC · JPL |
| 723886 | 2007 RB_{177} | — | September 10, 2007 | Mount Lemmon | Mount Lemmon Survey | · | 890 m | MPC · JPL |
| 723887 | 2007 RY_{178} | — | September 10, 2007 | Kitt Peak | Spacewatch | HNS | 1.1 km | MPC · JPL |
| 723888 | 2007 RP_{180} | — | September 11, 2007 | Mount Lemmon | Mount Lemmon Survey | · | 2.6 km | MPC · JPL |
| 723889 | 2007 RK_{182} | — | August 10, 2007 | Kitt Peak | Spacewatch | · | 2.7 km | MPC · JPL |
| 723890 | 2007 RH_{183} | — | October 10, 2002 | Apache Point | SDSS Collaboration | TIR | 2.5 km | MPC · JPL |
| 723891 | 2007 RJ_{184} | — | September 13, 2007 | Mount Lemmon | Mount Lemmon Survey | · | 2.7 km | MPC · JPL |
| 723892 | 2007 RC_{198} | — | September 13, 2007 | Mount Lemmon | Mount Lemmon Survey | · | 1.8 km | MPC · JPL |
| 723893 | 2007 RG_{199} | — | August 18, 2007 | Gaisberg | Gierlinger, R. | · | 1.8 km | MPC · JPL |
| 723894 | 2007 RP_{199} | — | September 13, 2007 | Kitt Peak | Spacewatch | · | 2.6 km | MPC · JPL |
| 723895 | 2007 RB_{208} | — | September 10, 2007 | Kitt Peak | Spacewatch | EOS | 2.1 km | MPC · JPL |
| 723896 | 2007 RH_{208} | — | September 10, 2007 | Kitt Peak | Spacewatch | · | 3.0 km | MPC · JPL |
| 723897 | 2007 RJ_{222} | — | September 14, 2007 | Mount Lemmon | Mount Lemmon Survey | · | 1.3 km | MPC · JPL |
| 723898 | 2007 RA_{224} | — | September 10, 2007 | Kitt Peak | Spacewatch | · | 2.1 km | MPC · JPL |
| 723899 | 2007 RJ_{224} | — | September 10, 2007 | Kitt Peak | Spacewatch | · | 790 m | MPC · JPL |
| 723900 | 2007 RQ_{226} | — | September 10, 2007 | Kitt Peak | Spacewatch | · | 1.2 km | MPC · JPL |

== 723901–724000 ==
back to top

| Designation | | | Discovery | | | Properties | | Ref |
| Permanent | Provisional | Named after | Date | Site | Discoverer(s) | Category | Diam. | Ref |
|---|---|---|---|---|---|---|---|---|
| 723901 | 2007 RT_{226} | — | September 10, 2007 | Kitt Peak | Spacewatch | · | 2.6 km | MPC · JPL |
| 723902 | 2007 RL_{229} | — | September 11, 2007 | Mount Lemmon | Mount Lemmon Survey | H | 470 m | MPC · JPL |
| 723903 | 2007 RO_{229} | — | March 11, 2002 | Kitt Peak | Spacewatch | · | 530 m | MPC · JPL |
| 723904 | 2007 RD_{232} | — | September 11, 2007 | Mount Lemmon | Mount Lemmon Survey | · | 2.6 km | MPC · JPL |
| 723905 | 2007 RD_{235} | — | September 12, 2007 | Mount Lemmon | Mount Lemmon Survey | · | 1.0 km | MPC · JPL |
| 723906 | 2007 RQ_{240} | — | September 10, 2007 | Catalina | CSS | · | 3.1 km | MPC · JPL |
| 723907 | 2007 RX_{248} | — | April 12, 2005 | Kitt Peak | Deep Ecliptic Survey | · | 3.4 km | MPC · JPL |
| 723908 | 2007 RJ_{249} | — | September 13, 2007 | Mount Lemmon | Mount Lemmon Survey | URS | 2.5 km | MPC · JPL |
| 723909 | 2007 RH_{250} | — | September 20, 2001 | Apache Point | SDSS Collaboration | · | 3.2 km | MPC · JPL |
| 723910 | 2007 RH_{254} | — | March 4, 2005 | Catalina | CSS | · | 3.7 km | MPC · JPL |
| 723911 | 2007 RX_{260} | — | March 24, 2006 | Kitt Peak | Spacewatch | · | 1.5 km | MPC · JPL |
| 723912 | 2007 RX_{261} | — | September 14, 2007 | Kitt Peak | Spacewatch | · | 1.1 km | MPC · JPL |
| 723913 | 2007 RD_{262} | — | September 14, 2007 | Kitt Peak | Spacewatch | · | 2.7 km | MPC · JPL |
| 723914 | 2007 RB_{263} | — | September 15, 2007 | Mount Lemmon | Mount Lemmon Survey | L4 | 8.9 km | MPC · JPL |
| 723915 | 2007 RY_{267} | — | September 15, 2007 | Kitt Peak | Spacewatch | · | 2.4 km | MPC · JPL |
| 723916 | 2007 RS_{268} | — | September 15, 2007 | Kitt Peak | Spacewatch | DOR | 2.2 km | MPC · JPL |
| 723917 | 2007 RG_{272} | — | September 15, 2007 | Kitt Peak | Spacewatch | · | 1.4 km | MPC · JPL |
| 723918 | 2007 RM_{274} | — | September 9, 2007 | Mauna Kea | D. D. Balam, K. M. Perrett | · | 810 m | MPC · JPL |
| 723919 | 2007 RY_{275} | — | September 12, 2007 | Catalina | CSS | · | 660 m | MPC · JPL |
| 723920 | 2007 RL_{289} | — | September 12, 2007 | Mount Lemmon | Mount Lemmon Survey | · | 2.3 km | MPC · JPL |
| 723921 | 2007 RH_{297} | — | September 10, 2007 | Kitt Peak | Spacewatch | · | 3.0 km | MPC · JPL |
| 723922 | 2007 RF_{306} | — | September 14, 2007 | Mauna Kea | P. A. Wiegert | · | 2.3 km | MPC · JPL |
| 723923 | 2007 RU_{322} | — | September 13, 2007 | Mount Lemmon | Mount Lemmon Survey | MAS | 650 m | MPC · JPL |
| 723924 | 2007 RA_{324} | — | October 5, 2007 | Kitt Peak | Spacewatch | · | 2.4 km | MPC · JPL |
| 723925 | 2007 RB_{327} | — | October 3, 2011 | Mount Lemmon | Mount Lemmon Survey | · | 1.1 km | MPC · JPL |
| 723926 | 2007 RO_{327} | — | October 3, 2003 | Kitt Peak | Spacewatch | EUN | 950 m | MPC · JPL |
| 723927 | 2007 RH_{328} | — | September 13, 2007 | Kitt Peak | Spacewatch | · | 2.1 km | MPC · JPL |
| 723928 | 2007 RY_{328} | — | September 12, 2007 | Mount Lemmon | Mount Lemmon Survey | · | 1.2 km | MPC · JPL |
| 723929 | 2007 RO_{329} | — | September 4, 2007 | Mount Lemmon | Mount Lemmon Survey | (17392) | 1.2 km | MPC · JPL |
| 723930 | 2007 RS_{329} | — | September 5, 2007 | Mount Lemmon | Mount Lemmon Survey | EOS | 1.6 km | MPC · JPL |
| 723931 | 2007 RU_{332} | — | September 15, 2007 | Mount Lemmon | Mount Lemmon Survey | · | 2.3 km | MPC · JPL |
| 723932 | 2007 RK_{333} | — | September 11, 2007 | Kitt Peak | Spacewatch | · | 1.7 km | MPC · JPL |
| 723933 | 2007 RG_{334} | — | September 9, 2007 | Mount Lemmon | Mount Lemmon Survey | · | 3.5 km | MPC · JPL |
| 723934 | 2007 RO_{334} | — | September 12, 2007 | Mount Lemmon | Mount Lemmon Survey | · | 1.4 km | MPC · JPL |
| 723935 | 2007 RW_{334} | — | September 15, 2007 | Kitt Peak | Spacewatch | · | 2.6 km | MPC · JPL |
| 723936 | 2007 RY_{334} | — | October 11, 2012 | Haleakala | Pan-STARRS 1 | · | 1.5 km | MPC · JPL |
| 723937 | 2007 RD_{335} | — | September 12, 2007 | Mount Lemmon | Mount Lemmon Survey | LIX | 3.3 km | MPC · JPL |
| 723938 | 2007 RH_{335} | — | September 14, 2013 | Haleakala | Pan-STARRS 1 | · | 2.7 km | MPC · JPL |
| 723939 | 2007 RV_{336} | — | April 4, 2014 | Mount Lemmon | Mount Lemmon Survey | · | 1.0 km | MPC · JPL |
| 723940 | 2007 RO_{337} | — | September 23, 2014 | Mount Lemmon | Mount Lemmon Survey | · | 500 m | MPC · JPL |
| 723941 | 2007 RO_{338} | — | November 19, 2008 | Mount Lemmon | Mount Lemmon Survey | · | 2.2 km | MPC · JPL |
| 723942 | 2007 RQ_{338} | — | September 12, 2007 | Mount Lemmon | Mount Lemmon Survey | · | 3.0 km | MPC · JPL |
| 723943 | 2007 RT_{338} | — | September 12, 2007 | Mount Lemmon | Mount Lemmon Survey | · | 2.6 km | MPC · JPL |
| 723944 | 2007 RW_{338} | — | January 17, 2016 | Haleakala | Pan-STARRS 1 | · | 3.0 km | MPC · JPL |
| 723945 | 2007 RD_{339} | — | October 23, 2013 | Haleakala | Pan-STARRS 1 | · | 3.1 km | MPC · JPL |
| 723946 | 2007 RJ_{339} | — | October 5, 2013 | Haleakala | Pan-STARRS 1 | · | 2.4 km | MPC · JPL |
| 723947 | 2007 RZ_{339} | — | February 15, 2010 | Kitt Peak | Spacewatch | · | 2.3 km | MPC · JPL |
| 723948 | 2007 RJ_{340} | — | September 14, 2007 | Kitt Peak | Spacewatch | · | 2.4 km | MPC · JPL |
| 723949 | 2007 RL_{341} | — | October 3, 2013 | Mount Lemmon | Mount Lemmon Survey | · | 2.3 km | MPC · JPL |
| 723950 | 2007 RZ_{341} | — | December 22, 2008 | Mount Lemmon | Mount Lemmon Survey | · | 1.2 km | MPC · JPL |
| 723951 | 2007 RD_{342} | — | August 24, 2007 | Kitt Peak | Spacewatch | VER | 2.2 km | MPC · JPL |
| 723952 | 2007 RJ_{342} | — | September 14, 2007 | Mount Lemmon | Mount Lemmon Survey | · | 1.6 km | MPC · JPL |
| 723953 | 2007 RV_{342} | — | September 10, 2007 | Mount Lemmon | Mount Lemmon Survey | LUT | 3.1 km | MPC · JPL |
| 723954 | 2007 RL_{343} | — | December 2, 2008 | Mount Lemmon | Mount Lemmon Survey | · | 3.2 km | MPC · JPL |
| 723955 | 2007 RF_{344} | — | September 14, 2007 | Mount Lemmon | Mount Lemmon Survey | · | 2.3 km | MPC · JPL |
| 723956 | 2007 RZ_{346} | — | September 15, 2007 | Anderson Mesa | LONEOS | · | 3.0 km | MPC · JPL |
| 723957 | 2007 RH_{347} | — | February 5, 2016 | Haleakala | Pan-STARRS 1 | EOS | 1.5 km | MPC · JPL |
| 723958 | 2007 RM_{347} | — | September 12, 2007 | Mount Lemmon | Mount Lemmon Survey | · | 2.2 km | MPC · JPL |
| 723959 | 2007 RF_{348} | — | December 30, 2008 | Mount Lemmon | Mount Lemmon Survey | · | 1.8 km | MPC · JPL |
| 723960 | 2007 RV_{350} | — | February 17, 2010 | Kitt Peak | Spacewatch | · | 2.1 km | MPC · JPL |
| 723961 | 2007 RA_{351} | — | September 9, 2007 | Kitt Peak | Spacewatch | · | 780 m | MPC · JPL |
| 723962 | 2007 RT_{351} | — | December 13, 2015 | Haleakala | Pan-STARRS 1 | URS | 2.4 km | MPC · JPL |
| 723963 | 2007 RH_{353} | — | September 14, 2007 | Mount Lemmon | Mount Lemmon Survey | · | 2.4 km | MPC · JPL |
| 723964 | 2007 RL_{353} | — | September 14, 2007 | Mount Lemmon | Mount Lemmon Survey | · | 2.7 km | MPC · JPL |
| 723965 | 2007 RV_{354} | — | September 14, 2007 | Catalina | CSS | · | 2.8 km | MPC · JPL |
| 723966 | 2007 RW_{354} | — | September 13, 2007 | Kitt Peak | Spacewatch | (5) | 1.1 km | MPC · JPL |
| 723967 | 2007 RE_{355} | — | September 14, 2007 | Mount Lemmon | Mount Lemmon Survey | EOS | 1.2 km | MPC · JPL |
| 723968 | 2007 RT_{358} | — | September 9, 2007 | Kitt Peak | Spacewatch | · | 1.2 km | MPC · JPL |
| 723969 | 2007 RA_{359} | — | September 12, 2007 | Mount Lemmon | Mount Lemmon Survey | · | 1.1 km | MPC · JPL |
| 723970 | 2007 RJ_{359} | — | September 13, 2007 | Mount Lemmon | Mount Lemmon Survey | · | 2.1 km | MPC · JPL |
| 723971 | 2007 RH_{361} | — | September 14, 2007 | Mount Lemmon | Mount Lemmon Survey | · | 1.6 km | MPC · JPL |
| 723972 | 2007 RE_{363} | — | September 13, 2007 | Mount Lemmon | Mount Lemmon Survey | · | 1.2 km | MPC · JPL |
| 723973 | 2007 RT_{364} | — | September 12, 2007 | Mount Lemmon | Mount Lemmon Survey | · | 1.0 km | MPC · JPL |
| 723974 | 2007 RB_{368} | — | September 14, 2007 | Kitt Peak | Spacewatch | · | 2.3 km | MPC · JPL |
| 723975 | 2007 RW_{368} | — | September 19, 2003 | Kitt Peak | Spacewatch | SUL | 1.6 km | MPC · JPL |
| 723976 | 2007 RQ_{374} | — | September 12, 2007 | Mount Lemmon | Mount Lemmon Survey | · | 2.2 km | MPC · JPL |
| 723977 | 2007 RK_{377} | — | September 12, 2007 | Mount Lemmon | Mount Lemmon Survey | · | 1.0 km | MPC · JPL |
| 723978 | 2007 SC_{10} | — | September 10, 2007 | Mount Lemmon | Mount Lemmon Survey | · | 3.8 km | MPC · JPL |
| 723979 | 2007 SE_{25} | — | July 23, 2011 | Siding Spring | SSS | · | 1.8 km | MPC · JPL |
| 723980 | 2007 SJ_{25} | — | September 18, 2007 | Kitt Peak | Spacewatch | · | 1.7 km | MPC · JPL |
| 723981 | 2007 SS_{25} | — | September 25, 2007 | Mount Lemmon | Mount Lemmon Survey | · | 680 m | MPC · JPL |
| 723982 | 2007 SB_{26} | — | September 18, 2007 | Catalina | CSS | DOR | 1.8 km | MPC · JPL |
| 723983 | 2007 SP_{27} | — | September 30, 2007 | Kitt Peak | Spacewatch | · | 2.5 km | MPC · JPL |
| 723984 | 2007 SY_{27} | — | September 30, 2007 | Kitt Peak | Spacewatch | · | 2.3 km | MPC · JPL |
| 723985 | 2007 SS_{28} | — | September 19, 2007 | Kitt Peak | Spacewatch | · | 1.1 km | MPC · JPL |
| 723986 | 2007 SX_{29} | — | September 18, 2007 | Kitt Peak | Spacewatch | · | 1.6 km | MPC · JPL |
| 723987 | 2007 TN_{2} | — | October 2, 2007 | Majdanak | Sergeyev, A., Korotkiy, S. | KOR | 990 m | MPC · JPL |
| 723988 | 2007 TP_{14} | — | October 7, 2007 | Altschwendt | W. Ries | · | 620 m | MPC · JPL |
| 723989 | 2007 TF_{22} | — | October 10, 2007 | Charleston | R. Holmes | · | 1.9 km | MPC · JPL |
| 723990 | 2007 TX_{27} | — | September 11, 2007 | Mount Lemmon | Mount Lemmon Survey | · | 940 m | MPC · JPL |
| 723991 | 2007 TG_{34} | — | October 6, 2007 | Kitt Peak | Spacewatch | · | 2.1 km | MPC · JPL |
| 723992 | 2007 TG_{36} | — | October 4, 2007 | Mount Lemmon | Mount Lemmon Survey | · | 3.6 km | MPC · JPL |
| 723993 | 2007 TW_{36} | — | September 12, 2007 | Mount Lemmon | Mount Lemmon Survey | (5) | 890 m | MPC · JPL |
| 723994 | 2007 TM_{47} | — | October 4, 2007 | Kitt Peak | Spacewatch | · | 1.1 km | MPC · JPL |
| 723995 | 2007 TQ_{58} | — | October 5, 2007 | Kitt Peak | Spacewatch | · | 2.7 km | MPC · JPL |
| 723996 | 2007 TY_{59} | — | October 5, 2007 | Kitt Peak | Spacewatch | (194) | 1.7 km | MPC · JPL |
| 723997 | 2007 TU_{61} | — | September 8, 2007 | Mount Lemmon | Mount Lemmon Survey | · | 1.4 km | MPC · JPL |
| 723998 | 2007 TT_{71} | — | October 13, 2007 | Bergisch Gladbach | W. Bickel | · | 2.5 km | MPC · JPL |
| 723999 | 2007 TF_{72} | — | September 12, 2007 | Kitt Peak | Spacewatch | AGN | 950 m | MPC · JPL |
| 724000 | 2007 TO_{79} | — | October 5, 2007 | Kitt Peak | Spacewatch | · | 1.1 km | MPC · JPL |

back to top

== Meaning of names ==
As minor planet discoveries are confirmed, they are given a permanent number by the IAU's Minor Planet Center (MPC), and the discoverers can then submit names for them, following the IAU's naming conventions. The list below concerns those minor planets in the specified number-range that have received names, and explains the meanings of those names.

Official naming citations of newly named small Solar System bodies are approved and published in a bulletin by IAU's Working Group for Small Bodies Nomenclature (WGSBN). Before May 2021, citations were published in MPC's Minor Planet Circulars for many decades. Recent citations can also be found on the JPL Small-Body Database (SBDB). Until his death in 2016, German astronomer Lutz D. Schmadel compiled these citations into the Dictionary of Minor Planet Names (DMP) and regularly updated the collection.

Based on Paul Herget's The Names of the Minor Planets, Schmadel also researched the unclear origin of numerous asteroids, most of which had been named prior to World War II. This article incorporates text from this source, which is in the public domain: SBDB New namings may only be added to this list below after official publication as the preannouncement of names is condemned. The WGSBN publishes a comprehensive guideline for the naming rules of non-cometary small Solar System bodies.

| Named minor planet | Provisional | This minor planet was named for... | Ref · Catalog |
|---|---|---|---|
| 723217 Levesque | 2006 RY_{111} | Emily Levesque, American astronomer. | IAU · 723217 |
| 723218 Binsted | 2006 RE_{117} | Kim Binsted, American-Canadian-Austrian researcher on the faculty of the University of Hawaiʻi. | IAU · 723218 |
