= List of minor planets: 707001–708000 =

The following is a partial list of minor planets, running from minor-planet number 707001 through 708000, inclusive. The primary data for this and other partial lists is based on JPL's "Small-Body Orbital Elements" and data available from the Minor Planet Center. Critical list information is also provided by the MPC, unless otherwise specified from Lowell Observatory. A detailed description of the table's columns and additional sources are given on the main page including a complete list of every page in this series, and a statistical break-up on the dynamical classification of minor planets.

Also see the summary list of all named bodies in numerical and alphabetical order, and the corresponding naming citations for the number range of this particular list. New namings may only be added to this list after official publication, as the preannouncement of names is condemned by the Working Group for Small Bodies Nomenclature of the International Astronomical Union.

Near-Earth obj.	MBA (inner)	MBA (outer)	Centaur
Mars-crosser	MBA (middle)	Jupiter trojan	Trans-Neptunian obj.
Unclassified

== 707001–707100 ==
Designation			Discovery			Properties		Ref
Permanent	Provisional	Named after	Date	Site	Discoverer(s)	Category	Diam.	Ref
707001	2010 YF_{7}	—	December 25, 2010	Mount Lemmon	Mount Lemmon Survey	·	1.9 km	MPC; JPL
707002	2011 AZ_{2}	—	January 3, 2011	Kitt Peak	Spacewatch	·	1.9 km	MPC; JPL
707003	2011 AQ_{4}	—	July 29, 2008	Mount Lemmon	Mount Lemmon Survey	·	2.3 km	MPC; JPL
707004	2011 AA_{6}	—	January 3, 2011	Piszkéstető	Kuli, Z., K. Sárneczky	V	480 m	MPC; JPL
707005	2011 AW_{7}	—	January 2, 2011	Mount Lemmon	Mount Lemmon Survey	·	2.6 km	MPC; JPL
707006	2011 AX_{7}	—	January 2, 2011	Mount Lemmon	Mount Lemmon Survey	TIR	2.6 km	MPC; JPL
707007	2011 AF_{8}	—	January 31, 2006	Kitt Peak	Spacewatch	·	2.0 km	MPC; JPL
707008	2011 AM_{15}	—	December 10, 2010	Mount Lemmon	Mount Lemmon Survey	·	2.4 km	MPC; JPL
707009	2011 AH_{19}	—	January 7, 2011	Sierra Stars	Dillon, W. G.	·	2.3 km	MPC; JPL
707010	2011 AV_{22}	—	August 20, 2009	Kitt Peak	Spacewatch	·	1.8 km	MPC; JPL
707011	2011 AQ_{25}	—	November 15, 2010	Mount Lemmon	Mount Lemmon Survey	·	1.7 km	MPC; JPL
707012	2011 AR_{25}	—	January 17, 2004	Kitt Peak	Spacewatch	V	550 m	MPC; JPL
707013	2011 AO_{27}	—	January 9, 2011	Kitt Peak	Spacewatch	·	2.0 km	MPC; JPL
707014	2011 AJ_{28}	—	January 2, 2011	Mount Lemmon	Mount Lemmon Survey	·	2.5 km	MPC; JPL
707015	2011 AX_{33}	—	January 10, 2011	Kitt Peak	Spacewatch	·	2.4 km	MPC; JPL
707016	2011 AR_{36}	—	January 12, 2011	Mount Lemmon	Mount Lemmon Survey	·	1.8 km	MPC; JPL
707017	2011 AG_{38}	—	January 8, 2011	Kitt Peak	Spacewatch	·	930 m	MPC; JPL
707018	2011 AH_{41}	—	January 10, 2011	Mount Lemmon	Mount Lemmon Survey	TEL	1.3 km	MPC; JPL
707019	2011 AR_{42}	—	January 10, 2011	Mount Lemmon	Mount Lemmon Survey	·	2.3 km	MPC; JPL
707020	2011 AE_{44}	—	January 10, 2011	Kitt Peak	Spacewatch	·	1.7 km	MPC; JPL
707021	2011 AT_{44}	—	January 10, 2011	Kitt Peak	Spacewatch	·	710 m	MPC; JPL
707022	2011 AZ_{49}	—	January 13, 2011	Mount Lemmon	Mount Lemmon Survey	·	2.0 km	MPC; JPL
707023	2011 AD_{50}	—	January 13, 2011	Mount Lemmon	Mount Lemmon Survey	·	2.1 km	MPC; JPL
707024	2011 AG_{58}	—	August 24, 2001	Kitt Peak	Spacewatch	·	1.1 km	MPC; JPL
707025	2011 AN_{58}	—	January 12, 2011	Mount Lemmon	Mount Lemmon Survey	·	2.7 km	MPC; JPL
707026	2011 AB_{64}	—	December 6, 2010	Mount Lemmon	Mount Lemmon Survey	·	2.8 km	MPC; JPL
707027	2011 AO_{67}	—	November 18, 2006	Kitt Peak	Spacewatch	MAS	610 m	MPC; JPL
707028	2011 AC_{71}	—	January 14, 2011	Mount Lemmon	Mount Lemmon Survey	·	2.0 km	MPC; JPL
707029	2011 AM_{71}	—	January 14, 2011	Mount Lemmon	Mount Lemmon Survey	·	1.4 km	MPC; JPL
707030	2011 AD_{72}	—	January 1, 2011	Zelenchukskaya Station	Satovski, B.	·	2.8 km	MPC; JPL
707031	2011 AS_{73}	—	December 5, 2010	Kitt Peak	Spacewatch	·	1.1 km	MPC; JPL
707032	2011 AZ_{73}	—	October 12, 2006	Palomar	NEAT	·	1.0 km	MPC; JPL
707033	2011 AP_{74}	—	January 8, 2011	Kitt Peak	Spacewatch	·	3.4 km	MPC; JPL
707034	2011 AK_{76}	—	January 4, 2011	Mount Lemmon	Mount Lemmon Survey	·	2.9 km	MPC; JPL
707035	2011 AH_{78}	—	January 15, 2011	Mount Lemmon	Mount Lemmon Survey	·	2.3 km	MPC; JPL
707036	2011 AJ_{78}	—	January 14, 2011	Mount Lemmon	Mount Lemmon Survey	·	2.5 km	MPC; JPL
707037	2011 AK_{79}	—	January 9, 2011	Mount Lemmon	Mount Lemmon Survey	·	2.0 km	MPC; JPL
707038	2011 AT_{79}	—	January 11, 2011	Kitt Peak	Spacewatch	T_{j} (2.98)	3.0 km	MPC; JPL
707039	2011 AG_{81}	—	January 14, 2011	Kitt Peak	Spacewatch	EOS	1.7 km	MPC; JPL
707040	2011 AA_{83}	—	January 14, 2011	Kitt Peak	Spacewatch	EOS	1.4 km	MPC; JPL
707041	2011 AZ_{83}	—	January 14, 2011	Mount Lemmon	Mount Lemmon Survey	·	1.5 km	MPC; JPL
707042	2011 AD_{84}	—	January 9, 2011	Mount Lemmon	Mount Lemmon Survey	·	960 m	MPC; JPL
707043	2011 AH_{84}	—	January 10, 2011	Mount Lemmon	Mount Lemmon Survey	EOS	1.7 km	MPC; JPL
707044	2011 AT_{84}	—	January 10, 2011	Mount Lemmon	Mount Lemmon Survey	·	2.2 km	MPC; JPL
707045	2011 AZ_{84}	—	May 14, 2012	Mount Lemmon	Mount Lemmon Survey	PHO	750 m	MPC; JPL
707046	2011 AC_{85}	—	January 9, 2011	Charleston	R. Holmes	·	1.1 km	MPC; JPL
707047	2011 AN_{85}	—	August 14, 2013	Haleakala	Pan-STARRS 1	·	930 m	MPC; JPL
707048	2011 AK_{87}	—	January 2, 2011	Mount Lemmon	Mount Lemmon Survey	·	1.4 km	MPC; JPL
707049	2011 AO_{89}	—	January 8, 2011	Mount Lemmon	Mount Lemmon Survey	·	930 m	MPC; JPL
707050	2011 AE_{91}	—	January 2, 2011	Mount Lemmon	Mount Lemmon Survey	EOS	1.6 km	MPC; JPL
707051	2011 AG_{91}	—	May 20, 2018	Haleakala	Pan-STARRS 1	EOS	1.7 km	MPC; JPL
707052	2011 AM_{92}	—	January 1, 2012	Mount Lemmon	Mount Lemmon Survey	NAE	2.4 km	MPC; JPL
707053	2011 AY_{93}	—	December 5, 2010	Mount Lemmon	Mount Lemmon Survey	·	2.1 km	MPC; JPL
707054	2011 AS_{94}	—	January 14, 2011	Mount Lemmon	Mount Lemmon Survey	·	1.3 km	MPC; JPL
707055	2011 AG_{95}	—	January 14, 2011	Mount Lemmon	Mount Lemmon Survey	WIT	690 m	MPC; JPL
707056	2011 AL_{95}	—	January 14, 2011	Kitt Peak	Spacewatch	AGN	780 m	MPC; JPL
707057	2011 AM_{95}	—	January 12, 2011	Kitt Peak	Spacewatch	EOS	1.6 km	MPC; JPL
707058	2011 AY_{97}	—	January 12, 2011	Mount Lemmon	Mount Lemmon Survey	·	1.7 km	MPC; JPL
707059	2011 AA_{99}	—	January 2, 2011	Mount Lemmon	Mount Lemmon Survey	EOS	1.6 km	MPC; JPL
707060	2011 AC_{100}	—	January 4, 2011	Mount Lemmon	Mount Lemmon Survey	·	3.1 km	MPC; JPL
707061	2011 AU_{100}	—	January 11, 2011	Mount Lemmon	Mount Lemmon Survey	·	1.6 km	MPC; JPL
707062	2011 AR_{104}	—	January 14, 2011	Mount Lemmon	Mount Lemmon Survey	·	450 m	MPC; JPL
707063	2011 AC_{106}	—	January 14, 2011	Mount Lemmon	Mount Lemmon Survey	·	1.2 km	MPC; JPL
707064	2011 AU_{109}	—	January 13, 2011	Mount Lemmon	Mount Lemmon Survey	·	2.4 km	MPC; JPL
707065	2011 AF_{110}	—	January 14, 2011	Mount Lemmon	Mount Lemmon Survey	·	2.1 km	MPC; JPL
707066	2011 BW	—	November 7, 2005	Mauna Kea	A. Boattini	EOS	1.6 km	MPC; JPL
707067	2011 BO_{1}	—	July 7, 2005	Mauna Kea	Veillet, C.	MAS	620 m	MPC; JPL
707068	2011 BO_{3}	—	December 5, 2010	Mount Lemmon	Mount Lemmon Survey	·	2.3 km	MPC; JPL
707069	2011 BB_{4}	—	November 1, 2006	Kitt Peak	Spacewatch	NYS	820 m	MPC; JPL
707070	2011 BJ_{4}	—	December 25, 2005	Mount Lemmon	Mount Lemmon Survey	KOR	1.2 km	MPC; JPL
707071	2011 BN_{4}	—	January 16, 2011	Mount Lemmon	Mount Lemmon Survey	·	2.9 km	MPC; JPL
707072	2011 BO_{4}	—	January 16, 2011	Mount Lemmon	Mount Lemmon Survey	VER	2.4 km	MPC; JPL
707073	2011 BT_{4}	—	January 16, 2011	Mount Lemmon	Mount Lemmon Survey	·	620 m	MPC; JPL
707074	2011 BH_{5}	—	January 16, 2011	Mount Lemmon	Mount Lemmon Survey	·	2.0 km	MPC; JPL
707075	2011 BQ_{13}	—	November 3, 2004	Kitt Peak	Spacewatch	·	2.0 km	MPC; JPL
707076	2011 BP_{14}	—	April 30, 2001	Kitt Peak	Spacewatch	·	1.9 km	MPC; JPL
707077	2011 BK_{17}	—	January 10, 2011	Kitt Peak	Spacewatch	·	2.1 km	MPC; JPL
707078	2011 BX_{20}	—	January 16, 2011	Mount Lemmon	Mount Lemmon Survey	·	550 m	MPC; JPL
707079	2011 BE_{21}	—	January 23, 2011	Mount Lemmon	Mount Lemmon Survey	·	2.0 km	MPC; JPL
707080	2011 BH_{21}	—	January 23, 2011	Mount Lemmon	Mount Lemmon Survey	·	2.4 km	MPC; JPL
707081	2011 BF_{25}	—	December 21, 2006	7300	W. K. Y. Yeung	·	1.2 km	MPC; JPL
707082	2011 BF_{29}	—	January 8, 2011	Mount Lemmon	Mount Lemmon Survey	·	2.0 km	MPC; JPL
707083	2011 BW_{30}	—	January 26, 2011	Mount Lemmon	Mount Lemmon Survey	·	1.8 km	MPC; JPL
707084	2011 BA_{31}	—	February 8, 2003	La Silla	Barbieri, C.	·	930 m	MPC; JPL
707085	2011 BB_{35}	—	January 14, 2011	Kitt Peak	Spacewatch	VER	2.0 km	MPC; JPL
707086	2011 BO_{35}	—	January 28, 2011	Mount Lemmon	Mount Lemmon Survey	EOS	1.6 km	MPC; JPL
707087	2011 BX_{35}	—	January 28, 2011	Mount Lemmon	Mount Lemmon Survey	·	2.9 km	MPC; JPL
707088	2011 BB_{37}	—	August 28, 2009	Kitt Peak	Spacewatch	·	1.2 km	MPC; JPL
707089	2011 BJ_{38}	—	January 28, 2011	Mount Lemmon	Mount Lemmon Survey	·	1.7 km	MPC; JPL
707090	2011 BJ_{41}	—	January 30, 2011	Piszkés-tető	K. Sárneczky, Z. Kuli	·	780 m	MPC; JPL
707091	2011 BS_{42}	—	January 30, 2011	Piszkés-tető	K. Sárneczky, S. Kürti	·	2.2 km	MPC; JPL
707092	2011 BZ_{42}	—	January 30, 2011	Piszkés-tető	K. Sárneczky, Z. Kuli	·	2.4 km	MPC; JPL
707093	2011 BM_{44}	—	January 26, 2011	Catalina	CSS	·	2.6 km	MPC; JPL
707094	2011 BO_{45}	—	February 28, 2006	Catalina	CSS	·	1.8 km	MPC; JPL
707095	2011 BF_{48}	—	January 31, 2011	Piszkés-tető	K. Sárneczky, Z. Kuli	NEM	1.7 km	MPC; JPL
707096	2011 BS_{48}	—	January 31, 2011	Piszkés-tető	K. Sárneczky, Z. Kuli	ELF	3.8 km	MPC; JPL
707097	2011 BC_{58}	—	September 6, 2008	Mount Lemmon	Mount Lemmon Survey	URS	2.4 km	MPC; JPL
707098	2011 BW_{65}	—	January 27, 2011	Mayhill-ISON	L. Elenin	·	2.2 km	MPC; JPL
707099	2011 BE_{66}	—	September 28, 2009	Mount Lemmon	Mount Lemmon Survey	·	1.1 km	MPC; JPL
707100	2011 BA_{70}	—	October 21, 2006	Mount Lemmon	Mount Lemmon Survey	·	600 m	MPC; JPL

== 707101–707200 ==
back to top

Designation			Discovery			Properties		Ref
Permanent	Provisional	Named after	Date	Site	Discoverer(s)	Category	Diam.	Ref
707101	2011 BE_{71}	—	January 29, 2011	Kitt Peak	Spacewatch	·	2.4 km	MPC; JPL
707102	2011 BL_{72}	—	February 5, 2011	Haleakala	Pan-STARRS 1	·	2.0 km	MPC; JPL
707103	2011 BA_{73}	—	January 30, 2011	Haleakala	Pan-STARRS 1	·	2.9 km	MPC; JPL
707104	2011 BH_{74}	—	September 14, 2009	Catalina	CSS	·	1.1 km	MPC; JPL
707105	2011 BH_{75}	—	December 20, 2004	Mount Lemmon	Mount Lemmon Survey	HYG	2.5 km	MPC; JPL
707106	2011 BR_{82}	—	January 10, 2011	Mount Lemmon	Mount Lemmon Survey	·	760 m	MPC; JPL
707107	2011 BQ_{83}	—	January 26, 2011	Catalina	CSS	·	1.6 km	MPC; JPL
707108	2011 BM_{84}	—	December 8, 2010	Mount Lemmon	Mount Lemmon Survey	EUP	2.8 km	MPC; JPL
707109	2011 BD_{85}	—	January 29, 2011	Mayhill-ISON	L. Elenin	·	3.1 km	MPC; JPL
707110	2011 BU_{86}	—	January 27, 2011	Mount Lemmon	Mount Lemmon Survey	·	2.2 km	MPC; JPL
707111	2011 BX_{87}	—	February 4, 2006	Kitt Peak	Spacewatch	·	1.9 km	MPC; JPL
707112	2011 BU_{89}	—	January 16, 2004	Kitt Peak	Spacewatch	·	600 m	MPC; JPL
707113	2011 BL_{90}	—	July 7, 2005	Mauna Kea	Veillet, C.	·	760 m	MPC; JPL
707114	2011 BJ_{92}	—	January 28, 2011	Mount Lemmon	Mount Lemmon Survey	·	1.0 km	MPC; JPL
707115	2011 BZ_{92}	—	January 28, 2011	Mount Lemmon	Mount Lemmon Survey	·	2.7 km	MPC; JPL
707116	2011 BD_{97}	—	January 29, 2011	Mount Lemmon	Mount Lemmon Survey	·	2.4 km	MPC; JPL
707117	2011 BX_{98}	—	October 19, 2006	Mount Lemmon	Mount Lemmon Survey	·	870 m	MPC; JPL
707118	2011 BL_{100}	—	March 1, 2011	Catalina	CSS	JUN	820 m	MPC; JPL
707119	2011 BM_{102}	—	January 12, 2011	Mount Lemmon	Mount Lemmon Survey	EOS	1.5 km	MPC; JPL
707120	2011 BO_{102}	—	January 23, 2011	Mount Lemmon	Mount Lemmon Survey	THM	1.7 km	MPC; JPL
707121	2011 BT_{103}	—	January 27, 2011	Mount Lemmon	Mount Lemmon Survey	THM	1.9 km	MPC; JPL
707122	2011 BB_{104}	—	May 24, 2001	Apache Point	SDSS Collaboration	·	2.1 km	MPC; JPL
707123	2011 BE_{104}	—	February 5, 2000	Kitt Peak	Spacewatch	EOS	1.8 km	MPC; JPL
707124	2011 BU_{109}	—	September 19, 1998	Apache Point	SDSS Collaboration	EOS	1.5 km	MPC; JPL
707125	2011 BK_{111}	—	March 6, 2011	Mount Lemmon	Mount Lemmon Survey	·	2.4 km	MPC; JPL
707126	2011 BP_{111}	—	February 5, 2011	Haleakala	Pan-STARRS 1	LUT	3.1 km	MPC; JPL
707127	2011 BF_{112}	—	September 6, 2008	Kitt Peak	Spacewatch	VER	2.0 km	MPC; JPL
707128	2011 BP_{112}	—	February 5, 2011	Haleakala	Pan-STARRS 1	·	2.0 km	MPC; JPL
707129	2011 BJ_{116}	—	April 7, 2008	Kitt Peak	Spacewatch	·	890 m	MPC; JPL
707130	2011 BT_{119}	—	September 26, 2003	Apache Point	SDSS Collaboration	VER	2.1 km	MPC; JPL
707131	2011 BC_{120}	—	January 28, 2011	Mount Lemmon	Mount Lemmon Survey	·	2.3 km	MPC; JPL
707132	2011 BQ_{120}	—	March 2, 2006	Mount Lemmon	Mount Lemmon Survey	·	2.4 km	MPC; JPL
707133	2011 BS_{120}	—	January 14, 2011	Kitt Peak	Spacewatch	EOS	1.8 km	MPC; JPL
707134	2011 BW_{121}	—	February 11, 2011	Mount Lemmon	Mount Lemmon Survey	TIR	2.9 km	MPC; JPL
707135	2011 BX_{122}	—	December 1, 2005	Kitt Peak	Wasserman, L. H., Millis, R. L.	·	2.0 km	MPC; JPL
707136	2011 BH_{123}	—	October 4, 2006	Mount Lemmon	Mount Lemmon Survey	·	670 m	MPC; JPL
707137	2011 BC_{124}	—	February 7, 2011	Mount Lemmon	Mount Lemmon Survey	·	750 m	MPC; JPL
707138	2011 BK_{124}	—	February 8, 2011	Mount Lemmon	Mount Lemmon Survey	·	800 m	MPC; JPL
707139	2011 BP_{126}	—	January 27, 2011	Mount Lemmon	Mount Lemmon Survey	·	760 m	MPC; JPL
707140	2011 BL_{127}	—	January 27, 2011	Kitt Peak	Spacewatch	(43176)	2.4 km	MPC; JPL
707141	2011 BD_{128}	—	July 29, 2008	Mount Lemmon	Mount Lemmon Survey	·	2.5 km	MPC; JPL
707142	2011 BM_{128}	—	July 28, 2009	Kitt Peak	Spacewatch	V	550 m	MPC; JPL
707143	2011 BJ_{129}	—	September 20, 2003	Kitt Peak	Spacewatch	·	2.5 km	MPC; JPL
707144	2011 BR_{129}	—	January 28, 2011	Mount Lemmon	Mount Lemmon Survey	EOS	1.6 km	MPC; JPL
707145	2011 BP_{130}	—	January 28, 2011	Mount Lemmon	Mount Lemmon Survey	EOS	1.3 km	MPC; JPL
707146	2011 BD_{131}	—	January 28, 2011	Mount Lemmon	Mount Lemmon Survey	EOS	1.7 km	MPC; JPL
707147	2011 BH_{131}	—	January 28, 2011	Mount Lemmon	Mount Lemmon Survey	·	1.1 km	MPC; JPL
707148	2011 BY_{131}	—	January 28, 2011	Mount Lemmon	Mount Lemmon Survey	·	2.1 km	MPC; JPL
707149	2011 BK_{132}	—	January 28, 2011	Mount Lemmon	Mount Lemmon Survey	·	2.6 km	MPC; JPL
707150	2011 BJ_{135}	—	January 16, 2011	Mount Lemmon	Mount Lemmon Survey	·	1.8 km	MPC; JPL
707151	2011 BM_{137}	—	January 16, 2011	Mount Lemmon	Mount Lemmon Survey	EOS	1.6 km	MPC; JPL
707152	2011 BS_{139}	—	January 29, 2011	Mount Lemmon	Mount Lemmon Survey	EOS	1.3 km	MPC; JPL
707153	2011 BL_{140}	—	January 29, 2011	Mount Lemmon	Mount Lemmon Survey	EOS	1.6 km	MPC; JPL
707154	2011 BG_{142}	—	September 6, 2008	Mount Lemmon	Mount Lemmon Survey	VER	2.2 km	MPC; JPL
707155	2011 BJ_{143}	—	January 29, 2011	Mount Lemmon	Mount Lemmon Survey	VER	2.5 km	MPC; JPL
707156	2011 BB_{145}	—	February 2, 2006	Kitt Peak	Spacewatch	·	2.7 km	MPC; JPL
707157	2011 BH_{146}	—	July 25, 2003	Palomar	NEAT	EOS	1.7 km	MPC; JPL
707158	2011 BS_{146}	—	January 29, 2011	Mount Lemmon	Mount Lemmon Survey	THM	1.7 km	MPC; JPL
707159	2011 BH_{150}	—	January 29, 2011	Mount Lemmon	Mount Lemmon Survey	·	2.1 km	MPC; JPL
707160	2011 BN_{151}	—	January 29, 2011	Mount Lemmon	Mount Lemmon Survey	·	2.1 km	MPC; JPL
707161	2011 BE_{152}	—	January 29, 2011	Mount Lemmon	Mount Lemmon Survey	EOS	1.4 km	MPC; JPL
707162	2011 BA_{157}	—	November 23, 2006	Kitt Peak	Spacewatch	V	510 m	MPC; JPL
707163	2011 BE_{160}	—	January 29, 2011	Mount Lemmon	Mount Lemmon Survey	EOS	1.5 km	MPC; JPL
707164	2011 BM_{160}	—	January 29, 2011	Mount Lemmon	Mount Lemmon Survey	·	800 m	MPC; JPL
707165	2011 BQ_{161}	—	May 21, 2012	Haleakala	Pan-STARRS 1	·	2.9 km	MPC; JPL
707166	2011 BO_{163}	—	January 16, 2011	Mount Lemmon	Mount Lemmon Survey	·	2.3 km	MPC; JPL
707167	2011 BF_{164}	—	February 25, 2006	Mount Lemmon	Mount Lemmon Survey	EOS	1.5 km	MPC; JPL
707168	2011 BB_{165}	—	February 10, 2011	Mount Lemmon	Mount Lemmon Survey	VER	2.0 km	MPC; JPL
707169	2011 BP_{166}	—	January 28, 2011	Mount Lemmon	Mount Lemmon Survey	V	500 m	MPC; JPL
707170	2011 BN_{167}	—	March 6, 2011	Mount Lemmon	Mount Lemmon Survey	·	2.3 km	MPC; JPL
707171	2011 BQ_{167}	—	March 6, 2011	Mount Lemmon	Mount Lemmon Survey	·	2.5 km	MPC; JPL
707172	2011 BO_{169}	—	October 9, 2008	Mount Lemmon	Mount Lemmon Survey	·	2.7 km	MPC; JPL
707173	2011 BQ_{169}	—	February 13, 2011	Mount Lemmon	Mount Lemmon Survey	·	2.3 km	MPC; JPL
707174	2011 BA_{171}	—	October 7, 2013	Kitt Peak	Spacewatch	(5)	1.1 km	MPC; JPL
707175	2011 BK_{171}	—	January 30, 2011	Mount Lemmon	Mount Lemmon Survey	EOS	1.7 km	MPC; JPL
707176	2011 BT_{171}	—	January 25, 2011	Mount Lemmon	Mount Lemmon Survey	·	2.6 km	MPC; JPL
707177	2011 BA_{172}	—	April 1, 2012	Mount Lemmon	Mount Lemmon Survey	·	2.4 km	MPC; JPL
707178	2011 BG_{172}	—	July 25, 2014	Haleakala	Pan-STARRS 1	·	2.2 km	MPC; JPL
707179	2011 BM_{172}	—	January 30, 2011	Haleakala	Pan-STARRS 1	·	2.3 km	MPC; JPL
707180	2011 BP_{172}	—	April 21, 2012	Haleakala	Pan-STARRS 1	·	2.7 km	MPC; JPL
707181	2011 BV_{172}	—	February 10, 2011	Mount Lemmon	Mount Lemmon Survey	·	2.2 km	MPC; JPL
707182	2011 BB_{173}	—	January 30, 2011	Haleakala	Pan-STARRS 1	·	2.0 km	MPC; JPL
707183	2011 BR_{173}	—	August 23, 2014	Haleakala	Pan-STARRS 1	EOS	1.3 km	MPC; JPL
707184	2011 BY_{174}	—	February 8, 2011	Mount Lemmon	Mount Lemmon Survey	·	2.1 km	MPC; JPL
707185	2011 BE_{175}	—	October 13, 1998	Kitt Peak	Spacewatch	·	1.1 km	MPC; JPL
707186	2011 BH_{175}	—	February 12, 2011	Mount Lemmon	Mount Lemmon Survey	·	2.5 km	MPC; JPL
707187	2011 BX_{175}	—	January 30, 2011	Mount Lemmon	Mount Lemmon Survey	·	2.2 km	MPC; JPL
707188	2011 BW_{176}	—	July 14, 2013	Haleakala	Pan-STARRS 1	·	1.8 km	MPC; JPL
707189	2011 BA_{178}	—	January 25, 2011	Kitt Peak	Spacewatch	·	2.2 km	MPC; JPL
707190	2011 BH_{179}	—	February 5, 2011	Haleakala	Pan-STARRS 1	·	1.7 km	MPC; JPL
707191	2011 BK_{181}	—	February 11, 2011	Mount Lemmon	Mount Lemmon Survey	·	2.1 km	MPC; JPL
707192	2011 BL_{181}	—	March 21, 2017	Haleakala	Pan-STARRS 1	·	2.4 km	MPC; JPL
707193	2011 BN_{181}	—	March 16, 2012	Mount Lemmon	Mount Lemmon Survey	·	2.1 km	MPC; JPL
707194	2011 BR_{181}	—	October 21, 2014	Mount Lemmon	Mount Lemmon Survey	·	1.5 km	MPC; JPL
707195	2011 BF_{182}	—	January 23, 2011	Mount Lemmon	Mount Lemmon Survey	·	2.7 km	MPC; JPL
707196	2011 BJ_{182}	—	March 5, 2017	Haleakala	Pan-STARRS 1	·	2.5 km	MPC; JPL
707197	2011 BX_{182}	—	May 19, 2018	Haleakala	Pan-STARRS 1	·	2.1 km	MPC; JPL
707198	2011 BA_{183}	—	January 26, 2011	Mount Lemmon	Mount Lemmon Survey	·	1.4 km	MPC; JPL
707199	2011 BT_{183}	—	September 2, 2014	Haleakala	Pan-STARRS 1	EOS	1.5 km	MPC; JPL
707200	2011 BL_{184}	—	February 8, 2011	Mount Lemmon	Mount Lemmon Survey	EOS	1.5 km	MPC; JPL

== 707201–707300 ==
back to top

Designation			Discovery			Properties		Ref
Permanent	Provisional	Named after	Date	Site	Discoverer(s)	Category	Diam.	Ref
707201	2011 BR_{184}	—	April 13, 2018	Haleakala	Pan-STARRS 1	·	2.4 km	MPC; JPL
707202	2011 BT_{186}	—	January 27, 2011	Mount Lemmon	Mount Lemmon Survey	TIR	2.5 km	MPC; JPL
707203	2011 BS_{187}	—	January 26, 2011	Mount Lemmon	Mount Lemmon Survey	·	2.4 km	MPC; JPL
707204	2011 BE_{188}	—	August 23, 2014	Haleakala	Pan-STARRS 1	·	2.1 km	MPC; JPL
707205	2011 BK_{188}	—	August 25, 2014	Haleakala	Pan-STARRS 1	·	1.6 km	MPC; JPL
707206	2011 BR_{188}	—	January 31, 2016	Haleakala	Pan-STARRS 1	EOS	1.4 km	MPC; JPL
707207	2011 BY_{188}	—	January 29, 2011	Mount Lemmon	Mount Lemmon Survey	·	2.3 km	MPC; JPL
707208	2011 BE_{189}	—	January 30, 2011	Mount Lemmon	Mount Lemmon Survey	·	2.2 km	MPC; JPL
707209	2011 BV_{190}	—	January 8, 2016	Haleakala	Pan-STARRS 1	EOS	1.2 km	MPC; JPL
707210	2011 BW_{190}	—	February 5, 2011	Haleakala	Pan-STARRS 1	·	2.2 km	MPC; JPL
707211	2011 BE_{191}	—	December 14, 2015	Haleakala	Pan-STARRS 1	·	2.2 km	MPC; JPL
707212	2011 BW_{192}	—	January 26, 2011	Kitt Peak	Spacewatch	·	540 m	MPC; JPL
707213	2011 BH_{194}	—	January 28, 2011	Mount Lemmon	Mount Lemmon Survey	·	1.8 km	MPC; JPL
707214	2011 BP_{194}	—	January 30, 2011	Mount Lemmon	Mount Lemmon Survey	·	2.0 km	MPC; JPL
707215	2011 BR_{194}	—	January 28, 2011	Mount Lemmon	Mount Lemmon Survey	·	900 m	MPC; JPL
707216	2011 BV_{194}	—	January 30, 2011	Haleakala	Pan-STARRS 1	·	2.3 km	MPC; JPL
707217	2011 BG_{199}	—	January 28, 2011	Mount Lemmon	Mount Lemmon Survey	·	970 m	MPC; JPL
707218	2011 BH_{199}	—	January 30, 2011	Mount Lemmon	Mount Lemmon Survey	·	2.8 km	MPC; JPL
707219	2011 BX_{199}	—	January 27, 2011	Mount Lemmon	Mount Lemmon Survey	·	2.4 km	MPC; JPL
707220	2011 BY_{200}	—	January 28, 2017	Haleakala	Pan-STARRS 1	EOS	1.5 km	MPC; JPL
707221	2011 BZ_{204}	—	January 28, 2011	Mount Lemmon	Mount Lemmon Survey	EOS	1.4 km	MPC; JPL
707222	2011 BP_{208}	—	January 30, 2011	Haleakala	Pan-STARRS 1	·	1.3 km	MPC; JPL
707223	2011 BD_{209}	—	January 27, 2011	Mount Lemmon	Mount Lemmon Survey	·	2.3 km	MPC; JPL
707224	2011 BS_{209}	—	January 29, 2011	Mount Lemmon	Mount Lemmon Survey	·	2.0 km	MPC; JPL
707225	2011 CK_{7}	—	January 28, 2011	Mount Lemmon	Mount Lemmon Survey	EOS	1.4 km	MPC; JPL
707226	2011 CM_{7}	—	October 27, 2009	Mount Lemmon	Mount Lemmon Survey	EOS	1.3 km	MPC; JPL
707227	2011 CU_{9}	—	January 11, 2011	Kitt Peak	Spacewatch	·	870 m	MPC; JPL
707228	2011 CQ_{11}	—	October 24, 2005	Mauna Kea	A. Boattini	·	1.8 km	MPC; JPL
707229	2011 CA_{14}	—	September 12, 2005	Kitt Peak	Spacewatch	·	1.1 km	MPC; JPL
707230	2011 CM_{16}	—	February 12, 2004	Palomar	NEAT	·	640 m	MPC; JPL
707231	2011 CD_{23}	—	February 2, 2000	Kitt Peak	Spacewatch	LIX	2.7 km	MPC; JPL
707232	2011 CQ_{25}	—	January 4, 2011	Mount Lemmon	Mount Lemmon Survey	·	4.0 km	MPC; JPL
707233	2011 CL_{30}	—	January 27, 2011	Mount Lemmon	Mount Lemmon Survey	·	2.2 km	MPC; JPL
707234	2011 CW_{30}	—	September 13, 2002	Palomar	NEAT	·	1.0 km	MPC; JPL
707235	2011 CA_{31}	—	November 20, 2006	Kitt Peak	Spacewatch	MAS	850 m	MPC; JPL
707236	2011 CY_{34}	—	January 29, 2011	Kitt Peak	Spacewatch	LIX	3.2 km	MPC; JPL
707237	2011 CN_{35}	—	March 26, 2004	Kitt Peak	Spacewatch	·	1.0 km	MPC; JPL
707238	2011 CZ_{36}	—	January 27, 2011	Mount Lemmon	Mount Lemmon Survey	EOS	1.5 km	MPC; JPL
707239	2011 CM_{37}	—	February 5, 2011	Mount Lemmon	Mount Lemmon Survey	·	1.4 km	MPC; JPL
707240	2011 CO_{37}	—	February 5, 2011	Mount Lemmon	Mount Lemmon Survey	VER	2.2 km	MPC; JPL
707241	2011 CF_{40}	—	September 6, 2008	Kitt Peak	Spacewatch	VER	2.6 km	MPC; JPL
707242 Denniscrabtree	2011 CE_{41}	Denniscrabtree	August 29, 2003	Mauna Kea	D. D. Balam	·	1.4 km	MPC; JPL
707243	2011 CH_{41}	—	January 26, 2011	Mount Lemmon	Mount Lemmon Survey	EOS	1.6 km	MPC; JPL
707244	2011 CV_{48}	—	February 5, 2011	Mount Lemmon	Mount Lemmon Survey	·	1.3 km	MPC; JPL
707245	2011 CQ_{51}	—	September 17, 2003	Kitt Peak	Spacewatch	·	2.2 km	MPC; JPL
707246	2011 CB_{52}	—	February 7, 2011	Mount Lemmon	Mount Lemmon Survey	EOS	1.5 km	MPC; JPL
707247	2011 CM_{52}	—	February 7, 2011	Mount Lemmon	Mount Lemmon Survey	·	2.6 km	MPC; JPL
707248	2011 CP_{52}	—	February 7, 2011	Mount Lemmon	Mount Lemmon Survey	·	2.6 km	MPC; JPL
707249	2011 CX_{53}	—	February 8, 2011	Mount Lemmon	Mount Lemmon Survey	·	2.9 km	MPC; JPL
707250	2011 CP_{54}	—	February 8, 2011	Mount Lemmon	Mount Lemmon Survey	·	2.3 km	MPC; JPL
707251	2011 CA_{59}	—	February 8, 2011	Mount Lemmon	Mount Lemmon Survey	·	1.1 km	MPC; JPL
707252	2011 CY_{62}	—	January 30, 2011	Mount Lemmon	Mount Lemmon Survey	·	2.4 km	MPC; JPL
707253	2011 CT_{64}	—	October 23, 2003	Apache Point	SDSS Collaboration	·	2.3 km	MPC; JPL
707254	2011 CV_{70}	—	February 9, 2011	Dauban	C. Rinner, Kugel, F.	·	2.1 km	MPC; JPL
707255	2011 CE_{72}	—	January 26, 2011	Catalina	CSS	·	970 m	MPC; JPL
707256	2011 CK_{80}	—	February 5, 2011	Haleakala	Pan-STARRS 1	·	1.9 km	MPC; JPL
707257	2011 CH_{81}	—	February 5, 2011	Haleakala	Pan-STARRS 1	·	2.0 km	MPC; JPL
707258	2011 CZ_{81}	—	January 27, 2011	Kitt Peak	Spacewatch	URS	2.6 km	MPC; JPL
707259	2011 CJ_{85}	—	February 12, 2011	Mount Lemmon	Mount Lemmon Survey	·	2.3 km	MPC; JPL
707260	2011 CH_{87}	—	February 5, 2011	Haleakala	Pan-STARRS 1	·	2.0 km	MPC; JPL
707261	2011 CD_{91}	—	January 28, 2011	Kitt Peak	Spacewatch	EOS	1.7 km	MPC; JPL
707262	2011 CD_{92}	—	January 24, 2011	Kitt Peak	Spacewatch	NYS	1.2 km	MPC; JPL
707263	2011 CN_{95}	—	February 10, 2011	Mount Lemmon	Mount Lemmon Survey	·	1.6 km	MPC; JPL
707264	2011 CG_{96}	—	March 6, 2011	Mount Lemmon	Mount Lemmon Survey	·	2.5 km	MPC; JPL
707265	2011 CV_{96}	—	September 6, 2008	Mount Lemmon	Mount Lemmon Survey	·	2.2 km	MPC; JPL
707266	2011 CC_{98}	—	October 27, 2009	Kitt Peak	Spacewatch	·	690 m	MPC; JPL
707267	2011 CD_{99}	—	February 5, 2011	Haleakala	Pan-STARRS 1	EOS	1.6 km	MPC; JPL
707268	2011 CP_{99}	—	October 22, 2003	Kitt Peak	Spacewatch	·	2.1 km	MPC; JPL
707269	2011 CF_{100}	—	February 5, 2011	Haleakala	Pan-STARRS 1	·	1.9 km	MPC; JPL
707270	2011 CT_{100}	—	February 5, 2011	Haleakala	Pan-STARRS 1	·	2.8 km	MPC; JPL
707271	2011 CY_{100}	—	February 5, 2011	Haleakala	Pan-STARRS 1	·	2.4 km	MPC; JPL
707272	2011 CX_{103}	—	March 6, 2011	Mount Lemmon	Mount Lemmon Survey	·	2.3 km	MPC; JPL
707273	2011 CR_{104}	—	February 5, 2011	Haleakala	Pan-STARRS 1	TIR	2.3 km	MPC; JPL
707274	2011 CB_{106}	—	March 5, 2011	Mount Lemmon	Mount Lemmon Survey	·	2.2 km	MPC; JPL
707275	2011 CH_{108}	—	February 12, 2011	Mount Lemmon	Mount Lemmon Survey	MAS	650 m	MPC; JPL
707276	2011 CV_{108}	—	February 26, 2011	Mount Lemmon	Mount Lemmon Survey	VER	2.2 km	MPC; JPL
707277	2011 CA_{110}	—	March 6, 2011	Mount Lemmon	Mount Lemmon Survey	·	2.6 km	MPC; JPL
707278	2011 CR_{110}	—	February 4, 2005	Kitt Peak	Spacewatch	·	3.0 km	MPC; JPL
707279	2011 CS_{110}	—	February 5, 2011	Haleakala	Pan-STARRS 1	HYG	2.3 km	MPC; JPL
707280	2011 CG_{112}	—	February 5, 2011	Haleakala	Pan-STARRS 1	·	2.3 km	MPC; JPL
707281	2011 CU_{112}	—	February 5, 2011	Haleakala	Pan-STARRS 1	·	2.3 km	MPC; JPL
707282	2011 CY_{112}	—	February 12, 2011	Mount Lemmon	Mount Lemmon Survey	·	2.9 km	MPC; JPL
707283	2011 CV_{113}	—	March 29, 2004	Kitt Peak	Spacewatch	·	900 m	MPC; JPL
707284	2011 CG_{117}	—	February 13, 2011	Mount Lemmon	Mount Lemmon Survey	·	2.5 km	MPC; JPL
707285	2011 CC_{118}	—	March 31, 2016	Mount Lemmon	Mount Lemmon Survey	(12739)	1.2 km	MPC; JPL
707286	2011 CZ_{120}	—	February 12, 2011	Kitt Peak	Spacewatch	·	2.2 km	MPC; JPL
707287	2011 CF_{122}	—	February 4, 2011	Catalina	CSS	·	2.7 km	MPC; JPL
707288	2011 CD_{123}	—	August 8, 2013	Haleakala	Pan-STARRS 1	·	1.1 km	MPC; JPL
707289	2011 CP_{123}	—	February 7, 2011	Mount Lemmon	Mount Lemmon Survey	·	3.1 km	MPC; JPL
707290	2011 CY_{123}	—	April 27, 2012	Haleakala	Pan-STARRS 1	·	2.2 km	MPC; JPL
707291	2011 CT_{124}	—	March 27, 2012	Mount Lemmon	Mount Lemmon Survey	EOS	1.6 km	MPC; JPL
707292	2011 CW_{124}	—	July 31, 2014	Haleakala	Pan-STARRS 1	VER	2.3 km	MPC; JPL
707293	2011 CX_{124}	—	August 3, 2013	Haleakala	Pan-STARRS 1	URS	2.3 km	MPC; JPL
707294	2011 CB_{125}	—	October 18, 2014	Mount Lemmon	Mount Lemmon Survey	·	2.5 km	MPC; JPL
707295	2011 CE_{125}	—	October 28, 2014	Haleakala	Pan-STARRS 1	·	1.7 km	MPC; JPL
707296	2011 CL_{126}	—	July 12, 2013	Haleakala	Pan-STARRS 1	·	2.4 km	MPC; JPL
707297	2011 CD_{127}	—	July 14, 2013	Haleakala	Pan-STARRS 1	·	2.5 km	MPC; JPL
707298	2011 CG_{127}	—	February 10, 2011	Mount Lemmon	Mount Lemmon Survey	·	2.2 km	MPC; JPL
707299	2011 CH_{127}	—	July 30, 2014	Haleakala	Pan-STARRS 1	·	2.3 km	MPC; JPL
707300	2011 CQ_{127}	—	October 28, 2014	Mount Lemmon	Mount Lemmon Survey	EOS	1.6 km	MPC; JPL

== 707301–707400 ==
back to top

Designation			Discovery			Properties		Ref
Permanent	Provisional	Named after	Date	Site	Discoverer(s)	Category	Diam.	Ref
707301	2011 CN_{128}	—	February 8, 2011	Mount Lemmon	Mount Lemmon Survey	WIT	710 m	MPC; JPL
707302	2011 CM_{130}	—	February 10, 2011	Mount Lemmon	Mount Lemmon Survey	·	880 m	MPC; JPL
707303	2011 CX_{132}	—	February 5, 2011	Haleakala	Pan-STARRS 1	·	2.0 km	MPC; JPL
707304	2011 CC_{133}	—	February 11, 2011	Mount Lemmon	Mount Lemmon Survey	·	2.2 km	MPC; JPL
707305	2011 CO_{133}	—	February 10, 2011	Mount Lemmon	Mount Lemmon Survey	·	570 m	MPC; JPL
707306	2011 CQ_{133}	—	February 8, 2011	Mount Lemmon	Mount Lemmon Survey	·	2.2 km	MPC; JPL
707307	2011 CE_{134}	—	February 13, 2011	Mount Lemmon	Mount Lemmon Survey	·	910 m	MPC; JPL
707308	2011 CJ_{138}	—	February 12, 2011	Mount Lemmon	Mount Lemmon Survey	EOS	1.2 km	MPC; JPL
707309	2011 CP_{138}	—	February 5, 2011	Haleakala	Pan-STARRS 1	·	1.4 km	MPC; JPL
707310	2011 CY_{139}	—	February 8, 2011	Mount Lemmon	Mount Lemmon Survey	·	1.2 km	MPC; JPL
707311	2011 CA_{140}	—	February 13, 2011	Mount Lemmon	Mount Lemmon Survey	·	2.3 km	MPC; JPL
707312	2011 CX_{140}	—	February 5, 2011	Haleakala	Pan-STARRS 1	·	960 m	MPC; JPL
707313	2011 CX_{145}	—	February 10, 2011	Mount Lemmon	Mount Lemmon Survey	EOS	1.3 km	MPC; JPL
707314	2011 CQ_{146}	—	February 10, 2011	Mount Lemmon	Mount Lemmon Survey	·	1.4 km	MPC; JPL
707315	2011 CB_{152}	—	November 9, 2004	Mauna Kea	Veillet, C.	KOR	970 m	MPC; JPL
707316	2011 CO_{153}	—	February 8, 2011	Mount Lemmon	Mount Lemmon Survey	·	1.9 km	MPC; JPL
707317	2011 CS_{154}	—	February 10, 2011	Mount Lemmon	Mount Lemmon Survey	·	720 m	MPC; JPL
707318	2011 DQ_{2}	—	December 21, 2006	Mount Lemmon	Mount Lemmon Survey	CLA	1.4 km	MPC; JPL
707319	2011 DL_{5}	—	April 19, 2006	Mount Lemmon	Mount Lemmon Survey	THM	2.0 km	MPC; JPL
707320	2011 DC_{6}	—	December 2, 2005	Mauna Kea	A. Boattini	·	1.8 km	MPC; JPL
707321	2011 DU_{13}	—	January 17, 2007	Kitt Peak	Spacewatch	·	1.0 km	MPC; JPL
707322	2011 DY_{15}	—	April 2, 2005	Mount Lemmon	Mount Lemmon Survey	·	570 m	MPC; JPL
707323	2011 DF_{17}	—	February 26, 2011	Mount Lemmon	Mount Lemmon Survey	·	1.4 km	MPC; JPL
707324	2011 DU_{17}	—	October 13, 2006	Kitt Peak	Spacewatch	·	580 m	MPC; JPL
707325	2011 DV_{17}	—	February 26, 2011	Mount Lemmon	Mount Lemmon Survey	·	2.0 km	MPC; JPL
707326	2011 DX_{18}	—	January 29, 2011	Kitt Peak	Spacewatch	HYG	2.4 km	MPC; JPL
707327	2011 DE_{21}	—	September 16, 1998	Kitt Peak	Spacewatch	·	1.7 km	MPC; JPL
707328	2011 DR_{21}	—	September 7, 2008	Mount Lemmon	Mount Lemmon Survey	·	2.6 km	MPC; JPL
707329	2011 DR_{28}	—	October 1, 2008	Mount Lemmon	Mount Lemmon Survey	·	2.6 km	MPC; JPL
707330	2011 DK_{29}	—	January 29, 2011	Kitt Peak	Spacewatch	VER	2.6 km	MPC; JPL
707331	2011 DQ_{29}	—	September 24, 2009	Mount Lemmon	Mount Lemmon Survey	·	1.1 km	MPC; JPL
707332	2011 DT_{29}	—	January 29, 2011	Kitt Peak	Spacewatch	EOS	1.4 km	MPC; JPL
707333	2011 DO_{31}	—	October 23, 2009	Kitt Peak	Spacewatch	THM	2.0 km	MPC; JPL
707334	2011 DT_{33}	—	November 9, 2009	Kitt Peak	Spacewatch	·	1.9 km	MPC; JPL
707335	2011 DF_{34}	—	February 25, 2011	Mount Lemmon	Mount Lemmon Survey	·	2.4 km	MPC; JPL
707336	2011 DQ_{34}	—	October 26, 2009	Mount Lemmon	Mount Lemmon Survey	·	1.2 km	MPC; JPL
707337	2011 DE_{37}	—	October 5, 2005	Catalina	CSS	·	1.2 km	MPC; JPL
707338	2011 DB_{38}	—	February 25, 2011	Mount Lemmon	Mount Lemmon Survey	·	2.6 km	MPC; JPL
707339	2011 DK_{39}	—	February 25, 2011	Mount Lemmon	Mount Lemmon Survey	·	2.6 km	MPC; JPL
707340	2011 DZ_{39}	—	January 26, 2011	Mount Lemmon	Mount Lemmon Survey	·	2.5 km	MPC; JPL
707341	2011 DR_{40}	—	February 11, 2000	Kitt Peak	Spacewatch	MAS	630 m	MPC; JPL
707342	2011 DZ_{41}	—	February 25, 2011	Mount Lemmon	Mount Lemmon Survey	·	1.2 km	MPC; JPL
707343	2011 DK_{43}	—	February 26, 2011	Mount Lemmon	Mount Lemmon Survey	·	2.3 km	MPC; JPL
707344	2011 DQ_{43}	—	April 21, 2006	Kitt Peak	Spacewatch	·	2.5 km	MPC; JPL
707345	2011 DH_{45}	—	October 21, 2006	Mount Lemmon	Mount Lemmon Survey	·	610 m	MPC; JPL
707346	2011 DQ_{47}	—	February 26, 2011	Mount Lemmon	Mount Lemmon Survey	·	690 m	MPC; JPL
707347	2011 DH_{48}	—	February 26, 2011	Mount Lemmon	Mount Lemmon Survey	·	2.6 km	MPC; JPL
707348	2011 DB_{51}	—	January 18, 2004	Palomar	NEAT	·	690 m	MPC; JPL
707349	2011 DP_{53}	—	February 10, 2007	Mount Lemmon	Mount Lemmon Survey	V	500 m	MPC; JPL
707350	2011 DQ_{53}	—	February 25, 2011	Mount Lemmon	Mount Lemmon Survey	·	1.1 km	MPC; JPL
707351	2011 DR_{53}	—	February 9, 2007	Mount Lemmon	Mount Lemmon Survey	·	940 m	MPC; JPL
707352	2011 DT_{53}	—	September 19, 2014	Haleakala	Pan-STARRS 1	·	2.8 km	MPC; JPL
707353	2011 DO_{55}	—	July 14, 2013	Haleakala	Pan-STARRS 1	·	2.3 km	MPC; JPL
707354	2011 DS_{55}	—	February 23, 2017	Mount Lemmon	Mount Lemmon Survey	·	2.5 km	MPC; JPL
707355	2011 DM_{56}	—	February 25, 2011	Mount Lemmon	Mount Lemmon Survey	·	1.2 km	MPC; JPL
707356	2011 DV_{57}	—	February 25, 2011	Mount Lemmon	Mount Lemmon Survey	·	830 m	MPC; JPL
707357	2011 DD_{60}	—	February 26, 2011	Mount Lemmon	Mount Lemmon Survey	URS	2.3 km	MPC; JPL
707358	2011 EC_{3}	—	January 30, 2011	Mayhill-ISON	L. Elenin	·	1.6 km	MPC; JPL
707359	2011 EG_{3}	—	February 5, 2011	Mount Lemmon	Mount Lemmon Survey	·	3.0 km	MPC; JPL
707360	2011 EC_{4}	—	March 1, 2011	Mount Lemmon	Mount Lemmon Survey	·	1.2 km	MPC; JPL
707361	2011 ER_{6}	—	February 10, 2011	Mount Lemmon	Mount Lemmon Survey	EOS	1.6 km	MPC; JPL
707362	2011 EF_{8}	—	March 2, 2011	Bergisch Gladbach	W. Bickel	·	2.8 km	MPC; JPL
707363	2011 ED_{10}	—	March 3, 2011	Mount Lemmon	Mount Lemmon Survey	·	1.4 km	MPC; JPL
707364	2011 EL_{14}	—	March 2, 2011	Bergisch Gladbach	W. Bickel	·	3.0 km	MPC; JPL
707365	2011 EX_{19}	—	January 28, 2011	Catalina	CSS	·	2.5 km	MPC; JPL
707366	2011 EJ_{33}	—	February 23, 2011	Kitt Peak	Spacewatch	MAS	660 m	MPC; JPL
707367	2011 EQ_{33}	—	October 16, 2009	Mount Lemmon	Mount Lemmon Survey	V	550 m	MPC; JPL
707368	2011 EJ_{39}	—	March 6, 2011	Kitt Peak	Spacewatch	H	470 m	MPC; JPL
707369	2011 EF_{41}	—	April 22, 2004	Apache Point	SDSS Collaboration	PHO	1.1 km	MPC; JPL
707370	2011 EG_{47}	—	March 2, 2011	Catalina	CSS	·	1.3 km	MPC; JPL
707371	2011 EQ_{47}	—	March 5, 2011	Mount Lemmon	Mount Lemmon Survey	EOS	1.8 km	MPC; JPL
707372	2011 EW_{47}	—	March 5, 2011	Mount Lemmon	Mount Lemmon Survey	·	3.2 km	MPC; JPL
707373	2011 EC_{49}	—	March 10, 2011	Mount Lemmon	Mount Lemmon Survey	·	980 m	MPC; JPL
707374	2011 ED_{49}	—	March 10, 2011	Mount Lemmon	Mount Lemmon Survey	·	2.3 km	MPC; JPL
707375	2011 EQ_{53}	—	November 9, 2009	Mount Lemmon	Mount Lemmon Survey	V	730 m	MPC; JPL
707376	2011 EV_{55}	—	March 12, 2011	Mount Lemmon	Mount Lemmon Survey	V	560 m	MPC; JPL
707377	2011 EA_{56}	—	March 12, 2011	Mount Lemmon	Mount Lemmon Survey	EOS	1.5 km	MPC; JPL
707378	2011 EK_{56}	—	March 12, 2011	Mount Lemmon	Mount Lemmon Survey	·	780 m	MPC; JPL
707379	2011 EQ_{57}	—	March 26, 2006	Mount Lemmon	Mount Lemmon Survey	·	2.6 km	MPC; JPL
707380	2011 ER_{58}	—	March 12, 2011	Mount Lemmon	Mount Lemmon Survey	·	2.4 km	MPC; JPL
707381	2011 EU_{60}	—	March 12, 2011	Mount Lemmon	Mount Lemmon Survey	VER	2.1 km	MPC; JPL
707382	2011 EV_{60}	—	March 12, 2011	Mount Lemmon	Mount Lemmon Survey	·	2.3 km	MPC; JPL
707383	2011 EJ_{61}	—	March 12, 2011	Mount Lemmon	Mount Lemmon Survey	·	2.4 km	MPC; JPL
707384	2011 ER_{61}	—	December 10, 2009	Mount Lemmon	Mount Lemmon Survey	·	2.6 km	MPC; JPL
707385	2011 EO_{62}	—	March 12, 2011	Mount Lemmon	Mount Lemmon Survey	VER	2.5 km	MPC; JPL
707386	2011 EX_{62}	—	September 27, 2003	Kitt Peak	Spacewatch	·	2.8 km	MPC; JPL
707387	2011 EQ_{64}	—	March 9, 2011	Mount Lemmon	Mount Lemmon Survey	·	1.1 km	MPC; JPL
707388	2011 EE_{65}	—	September 25, 2008	Kitt Peak	Spacewatch	·	3.1 km	MPC; JPL
707389	2011 EK_{66}	—	February 8, 2011	Mount Lemmon	Mount Lemmon Survey	·	770 m	MPC; JPL
707390	2011 ET_{69}	—	March 10, 2011	Kitt Peak	Spacewatch	·	2.7 km	MPC; JPL
707391	2011 EH_{80}	—	March 14, 2011	Mount Lemmon	Mount Lemmon Survey	·	2.7 km	MPC; JPL
707392	2011 EX_{80}	—	March 4, 2011	Kitt Peak	Spacewatch	·	2.9 km	MPC; JPL
707393	2011 EL_{81}	—	April 9, 2003	Palomar	NEAT	RAF	810 m	MPC; JPL
707394	2011 EB_{84}	—	December 27, 2006	Mount Lemmon	Mount Lemmon Survey	·	1.2 km	MPC; JPL
707395	2011 EA_{85}	—	March 11, 2011	Mount Lemmon	Mount Lemmon Survey	·	3.5 km	MPC; JPL
707396	2011 EG_{91}	—	March 9, 2011	Catalina	CSS	·	1.2 km	MPC; JPL
707397	2011 EX_{91}	—	March 13, 2011	Mount Lemmon	Mount Lemmon Survey	·	2.2 km	MPC; JPL
707398	2011 EN_{92}	—	August 29, 2013	Haleakala	Pan-STARRS 1	·	2.6 km	MPC; JPL
707399	2011 EA_{93}	—	March 13, 2011	Kitt Peak	Spacewatch	·	3.2 km	MPC; JPL
707400	2011 EZ_{95}	—	January 31, 2016	Haleakala	Pan-STARRS 1	·	2.0 km	MPC; JPL

== 707401–707500 ==
back to top

Designation			Discovery			Properties		Ref
Permanent	Provisional	Named after	Date	Site	Discoverer(s)	Category	Diam.	Ref
707401	2011 ER_{96}	—	July 13, 2013	Haleakala	Pan-STARRS 1	VER	2.0 km	MPC; JPL
707402	2011 ET_{97}	—	August 27, 2014	Haleakala	Pan-STARRS 1	·	2.4 km	MPC; JPL
707403	2011 EZ_{99}	—	March 10, 2011	Kitt Peak	Spacewatch	·	2.3 km	MPC; JPL
707404	2011 EB_{100}	—	March 10, 2011	Kitt Peak	Spacewatch	·	2.6 km	MPC; JPL
707405	2011 EL_{100}	—	March 6, 2011	Mount Lemmon	Mount Lemmon Survey	·	530 m	MPC; JPL
707406	2011 EU_{100}	—	March 10, 2011	Kitt Peak	Spacewatch	·	2.0 km	MPC; JPL
707407	2011 EL_{101}	—	March 14, 2011	Kitt Peak	Spacewatch	·	1.4 km	MPC; JPL
707408	2011 EX_{102}	—	March 2, 2011	Mount Lemmon	Mount Lemmon Survey	·	1.2 km	MPC; JPL
707409	2011 EA_{103}	—	March 6, 2011	Mount Lemmon	Mount Lemmon Survey	·	1.3 km	MPC; JPL
707410	2011 EE_{105}	—	March 13, 2011	Kitt Peak	Spacewatch	·	1.0 km	MPC; JPL
707411	2011 FX_{9}	—	October 24, 2009	Catalina	CSS	·	3.3 km	MPC; JPL
707412	2011 FZ_{9}	—	October 22, 2003	Kitt Peak	Spacewatch	·	2.6 km	MPC; JPL
707413	2011 FJ_{14}	—	September 16, 2009	Mount Lemmon	Mount Lemmon Survey	H	480 m	MPC; JPL
707414	2011 FP_{14}	—	September 8, 2007	Eskridge	G. Hug	·	2.7 km	MPC; JPL
707415	2011 FY_{18}	—	October 24, 2008	Kitt Peak	Spacewatch	·	2.5 km	MPC; JPL
707416	2011 FM_{21}	—	January 29, 2003	Apache Point	SDSS Collaboration	MAS	680 m	MPC; JPL
707417	2011 FR_{22}	—	May 5, 2003	Kitt Peak	Spacewatch	·	860 m	MPC; JPL
707418	2011 FQ_{26}	—	March 30, 2011	Piszkés-tető	K. Sárneczky, Z. Kuli	·	1.3 km	MPC; JPL
707419	2011 FS_{27}	—	March 30, 2011	Piszkés-tető	K. Sárneczky, Z. Kuli	EUN	910 m	MPC; JPL
707420	2011 FH_{29}	—	March 30, 2011	Vitebsk	Nevski, V.	·	860 m	MPC; JPL
707421	2011 FK_{30}	—	March 26, 2011	Kitt Peak	Spacewatch	HOF	2.2 km	MPC; JPL
707422	2011 FG_{31}	—	February 8, 2007	Kitt Peak	Spacewatch	NYS	1.1 km	MPC; JPL
707423	2011 FJ_{40}	—	October 7, 2008	Mount Lemmon	Mount Lemmon Survey	·	2.1 km	MPC; JPL
707424	2011 FE_{42}	—	March 26, 2011	Mount Lemmon	Mount Lemmon Survey	·	2.9 km	MPC; JPL
707425	2011 FL_{44}	—	September 25, 2008	Mount Lemmon	Mount Lemmon Survey	·	2.2 km	MPC; JPL
707426	2011 FA_{46}	—	January 17, 2007	Kitt Peak	Spacewatch	NYS	1.1 km	MPC; JPL
707427	2011 FX_{47}	—	March 29, 2011	Kitt Peak	Spacewatch	·	550 m	MPC; JPL
707428	2011 FD_{48}	—	March 29, 2011	Mount Lemmon	Mount Lemmon Survey	·	2.9 km	MPC; JPL
707429	2011 FH_{49}	—	March 30, 2011	Mount Lemmon	Mount Lemmon Survey	URS	2.5 km	MPC; JPL
707430	2011 FX_{50}	—	March 30, 2011	Mount Lemmon	Mount Lemmon Survey	EOS	1.6 km	MPC; JPL
707431	2011 FY_{50}	—	September 23, 2008	Mount Lemmon	Mount Lemmon Survey	·	2.6 km	MPC; JPL
707432	2011 FG_{51}	—	March 30, 2011	Piszkés-tető	K. Sárneczky, Z. Kuli	VER	2.5 km	MPC; JPL
707433	2011 FX_{55}	—	September 7, 2008	Mount Lemmon	Mount Lemmon Survey	·	1.1 km	MPC; JPL
707434	2011 FB_{57}	—	March 30, 2011	Mount Lemmon	Mount Lemmon Survey	·	2.6 km	MPC; JPL
707435	2011 FG_{57}	—	September 29, 2008	Mount Lemmon	Mount Lemmon Survey	·	2.7 km	MPC; JPL
707436	2011 FX_{58}	—	March 30, 2011	Mount Lemmon	Mount Lemmon Survey	·	2.6 km	MPC; JPL
707437	2011 FH_{61}	—	March 30, 2011	Mount Lemmon	Mount Lemmon Survey	·	720 m	MPC; JPL
707438	2011 FO_{62}	—	March 30, 2011	Mount Lemmon	Mount Lemmon Survey	·	1.1 km	MPC; JPL
707439	2011 FJ_{66}	—	March 30, 2011	Mount Lemmon	Mount Lemmon Survey	·	1.3 km	MPC; JPL
707440	2011 FA_{68}	—	February 9, 2005	Mount Lemmon	Mount Lemmon Survey	VER	1.9 km	MPC; JPL
707441	2011 FR_{70}	—	December 27, 2006	Mount Lemmon	Mount Lemmon Survey	MAS	570 m	MPC; JPL
707442	2011 FN_{72}	—	September 21, 2009	Kitt Peak	Spacewatch	·	970 m	MPC; JPL
707443	2011 FB_{73}	—	November 6, 2008	Mount Lemmon	Mount Lemmon Survey	·	2.8 km	MPC; JPL
707444	2011 FP_{73}	—	March 5, 2011	Mount Lemmon	Mount Lemmon Survey	·	1.3 km	MPC; JPL
707445	2011 FC_{76}	—	April 5, 2003	Kitt Peak	Spacewatch	·	800 m	MPC; JPL
707446	2011 FZ_{79}	—	March 27, 2011	Mount Lemmon	Mount Lemmon Survey	·	1.0 km	MPC; JPL
707447	2011 FH_{92}	—	September 27, 2003	Kitt Peak	Spacewatch	·	2.1 km	MPC; JPL
707448	2011 FH_{101}	—	March 30, 2011	Mount Lemmon	Mount Lemmon Survey	·	2.5 km	MPC; JPL
707449	2011 FL_{111}	—	April 1, 2011	Mount Lemmon	Mount Lemmon Survey	·	1.0 km	MPC; JPL
707450	2011 FQ_{111}	—	April 1, 2011	Mount Lemmon	Mount Lemmon Survey	·	1.7 km	MPC; JPL
707451	2011 FC_{112}	—	April 1, 2011	Mount Lemmon	Mount Lemmon Survey	·	1 km	MPC; JPL
707452	2011 FB_{113}	—	September 5, 2008	Kitt Peak	Spacewatch	·	2.5 km	MPC; JPL
707453	2011 FW_{114}	—	October 8, 2008	Mount Lemmon	Mount Lemmon Survey	·	2.4 km	MPC; JPL
707454	2011 FA_{115}	—	November 6, 2008	Kitt Peak	Spacewatch	·	2.7 km	MPC; JPL
707455	2011 FX_{117}	—	April 2, 2011	Mount Lemmon	Mount Lemmon Survey	·	1.1 km	MPC; JPL
707456	2011 FC_{118}	—	April 2, 2011	Mount Lemmon	Mount Lemmon Survey	·	2.5 km	MPC; JPL
707457	2011 FS_{118}	—	August 24, 2008	Kitt Peak	Spacewatch	·	1.1 km	MPC; JPL
707458	2011 FJ_{119}	—	April 1, 2011	Mount Lemmon	Mount Lemmon Survey	EOS	1.2 km	MPC; JPL
707459	2011 FZ_{121}	—	September 5, 2008	Kitt Peak	Spacewatch	·	700 m	MPC; JPL
707460	2011 FG_{123}	—	April 1, 2011	Mount Lemmon	Mount Lemmon Survey	·	920 m	MPC; JPL
707461	2011 FP_{125}	—	April 1, 2011	Mount Lemmon	Mount Lemmon Survey	·	890 m	MPC; JPL
707462	2011 FT_{125}	—	April 2, 2011	Mount Lemmon	Mount Lemmon Survey	V	590 m	MPC; JPL
707463	2011 FW_{126}	—	November 9, 2009	Mount Lemmon	Mount Lemmon Survey	·	2.5 km	MPC; JPL
707464	2011 FO_{129}	—	April 2, 2011	Haleakala	Pan-STARRS 1	MAS	660 m	MPC; JPL
707465	2011 FB_{131}	—	March 10, 2007	Mount Lemmon	Mount Lemmon Survey	·	890 m	MPC; JPL
707466	2011 FC_{133}	—	September 23, 2001	Kitt Peak	Spacewatch	·	1.2 km	MPC; JPL
707467	2011 FO_{137}	—	May 20, 2006	Mount Lemmon	Mount Lemmon Survey	URS	2.7 km	MPC; JPL
707468	2011 FS_{138}	—	September 16, 2003	Kitt Peak	Spacewatch	·	2.9 km	MPC; JPL
707469	2011 FV_{138}	—	September 22, 2008	Kitt Peak	Spacewatch	EOS	1.4 km	MPC; JPL
707470	2011 FF_{139}	—	April 1, 2011	Kitt Peak	Spacewatch	·	860 m	MPC; JPL
707471	2011 FZ_{139}	—	April 5, 2011	Mount Lemmon	Mount Lemmon Survey	·	1.1 km	MPC; JPL
707472	2011 FA_{146}	—	March 29, 2011	Catalina	CSS	·	3.1 km	MPC; JPL
707473	2011 FY_{147}	—	March 28, 2011	Catalina	CSS	·	1.5 km	MPC; JPL
707474	2011 FC_{148}	—	March 28, 2011	Catalina	CSS	·	2.4 km	MPC; JPL
707475	2011 FA_{152}	—	March 25, 2011	Mount Lemmon	Mount Lemmon Survey	·	950 m	MPC; JPL
707476	2011 FQ_{155}	—	March 30, 2011	Mount Lemmon	Mount Lemmon Survey	VER	2.1 km	MPC; JPL
707477	2011 FE_{156}	—	October 3, 2008	Mount Lemmon	Mount Lemmon Survey	URS	3.0 km	MPC; JPL
707478	2011 FM_{156}	—	March 28, 2011	Mount Lemmon	Mount Lemmon Survey	·	980 m	MPC; JPL
707479	2011 FD_{157}	—	September 6, 2008	Mount Lemmon	Mount Lemmon Survey	EOS	2.1 km	MPC; JPL
707480	2011 FM_{157}	—	March 27, 2011	Mount Lemmon	Mount Lemmon Survey	HNS	920 m	MPC; JPL
707481	2011 FS_{157}	—	April 14, 2007	Kitt Peak	Spacewatch	·	950 m	MPC; JPL
707482	2011 FD_{159}	—	March 25, 2011	Kitt Peak	Spacewatch	·	1.1 km	MPC; JPL
707483	2011 FZ_{159}	—	November 23, 2014	Haleakala	Pan-STARRS 1	·	2.9 km	MPC; JPL
707484	2011 FJ_{160}	—	June 10, 2012	Haleakala	Pan-STARRS 1	·	1.4 km	MPC; JPL
707485	2011 FJ_{161}	—	September 3, 2013	Mount Lemmon	Mount Lemmon Survey	·	3.2 km	MPC; JPL
707486	2011 FG_{164}	—	July 13, 2016	Haleakala	Pan-STARRS 1	·	1.1 km	MPC; JPL
707487	2011 FN_{165}	—	April 11, 2015	Mount Lemmon	Mount Lemmon Survey	MAS	730 m	MPC; JPL
707488	2011 FP_{166}	—	March 28, 2011	Mount Lemmon	Mount Lemmon Survey	HYG	2.5 km	MPC; JPL
707489	2011 FZ_{166}	—	January 7, 2016	Haleakala	Pan-STARRS 1	·	2.2 km	MPC; JPL
707490	2011 FL_{170}	—	March 29, 2011	Mount Lemmon	Mount Lemmon Survey	·	2.0 km	MPC; JPL
707491	2011 FX_{172}	—	September 20, 2019	Mount Lemmon	Mount Lemmon Survey	·	2.3 km	MPC; JPL
707492	2011 GG_{11}	—	February 9, 2005	Kitt Peak	Spacewatch	LIX	2.9 km	MPC; JPL
707493	2011 GW_{12}	—	March 25, 2011	Kitt Peak	Spacewatch	·	2.6 km	MPC; JPL
707494	2011 GH_{13}	—	March 25, 2011	Kitt Peak	Spacewatch	·	500 m	MPC; JPL
707495	2011 GU_{13}	—	March 7, 2005	Goodricke-Pigott	R. A. Tucker	·	2.4 km	MPC; JPL
707496	2011 GX_{21}	—	August 17, 1999	Kitt Peak	Spacewatch	·	660 m	MPC; JPL
707497	2011 GT_{23}	—	April 4, 2011	Mount Lemmon	Mount Lemmon Survey	EUN	660 m	MPC; JPL
707498	2011 GD_{24}	—	December 7, 2005	Kitt Peak	Spacewatch	·	1.0 km	MPC; JPL
707499	2011 GG_{26}	—	January 11, 2011	Kitt Peak	Spacewatch	·	1.2 km	MPC; JPL
707500	2011 GW_{28}	—	April 1, 2011	Kitt Peak	Spacewatch	·	1.1 km	MPC; JPL

== 707501–707600 ==
back to top

Designation			Discovery			Properties		Ref
Permanent	Provisional	Named after	Date	Site	Discoverer(s)	Category	Diam.	Ref
707501	2011 GL_{29}	—	October 16, 2009	Mount Lemmon	Mount Lemmon Survey	NYS	1.1 km	MPC; JPL
707502	2011 GW_{29}	—	March 5, 2011	Kitt Peak	Spacewatch	·	2.0 km	MPC; JPL
707503	2011 GK_{33}	—	April 3, 2011	Haleakala	Pan-STARRS 1	·	2.7 km	MPC; JPL
707504	2011 GY_{34}	—	September 24, 2008	Kitt Peak	Spacewatch	·	790 m	MPC; JPL
707505	2011 GZ_{34}	—	April 3, 2011	Haleakala	Pan-STARRS 1	·	2.5 km	MPC; JPL
707506	2011 GZ_{37}	—	April 4, 2011	Mount Lemmon	Mount Lemmon Survey	·	1.0 km	MPC; JPL
707507	2011 GO_{38}	—	September 21, 2003	Mount Graham	Ryan, W.	THM	1.9 km	MPC; JPL
707508	2011 GP_{39}	—	April 4, 2011	Mount Lemmon	Mount Lemmon Survey	·	2.5 km	MPC; JPL
707509	2011 GT_{39}	—	March 27, 2011	Mount Lemmon	Mount Lemmon Survey	·	2.8 km	MPC; JPL
707510	2011 GE_{40}	—	April 4, 2011	Mount Lemmon	Mount Lemmon Survey	·	920 m	MPC; JPL
707511	2011 GR_{42}	—	January 30, 2011	Kitt Peak	Spacewatch	(43176)	2.5 km	MPC; JPL
707512	2011 GZ_{43}	—	April 4, 2011	Mount Lemmon	Mount Lemmon Survey	·	1.8 km	MPC; JPL
707513	2011 GW_{47}	—	March 30, 2011	Mount Lemmon	Mount Lemmon Survey	NYS	1.0 km	MPC; JPL
707514	2011 GC_{51}	—	October 27, 2008	Mount Lemmon	Mount Lemmon Survey	·	2.8 km	MPC; JPL
707515	2011 GC_{52}	—	April 5, 2011	Mount Lemmon	Mount Lemmon Survey	V	610 m	MPC; JPL
707516	2011 GY_{53}	—	February 10, 2011	Mount Lemmon	Mount Lemmon Survey	MAS	670 m	MPC; JPL
707517	2011 GF_{59}	—	March 29, 2004	Goodricke-Pigott	R. A. Tucker	·	520 m	MPC; JPL
707518	2011 GN_{66}	—	February 21, 2007	Mount Lemmon	Mount Lemmon Survey	·	1.1 km	MPC; JPL
707519	2011 GH_{69}	—	April 2, 2011	Haleakala	Pan-STARRS 1	H	420 m	MPC; JPL
707520 Tongji	2011 GR_{70}	Tongji	April 4, 2011	XuYi	PMO NEO Survey Program	·	1.3 km	MPC; JPL
707521	2011 GQ_{79}	—	April 18, 2007	Mount Lemmon	Mount Lemmon Survey	·	790 m	MPC; JPL
707522	2011 GT_{79}	—	November 1, 2008	Mount Lemmon	Mount Lemmon Survey	·	2.4 km	MPC; JPL
707523	2011 GA_{80}	—	April 13, 2011	Mount Lemmon	Mount Lemmon Survey	·	2.4 km	MPC; JPL
707524	2011 GL_{80}	—	April 13, 2011	Mount Lemmon	Mount Lemmon Survey	·	2.1 km	MPC; JPL
707525	2011 GT_{80}	—	November 19, 2008	Kitt Peak	Spacewatch	·	3.2 km	MPC; JPL
707526	2011 GH_{82}	—	April 14, 2011	Mount Lemmon	Mount Lemmon Survey	·	3.0 km	MPC; JPL
707527	2011 GL_{85}	—	July 10, 2019	Haleakala	Pan-STARRS 1	·	700 m	MPC; JPL
707528	2011 GB_{86}	—	September 13, 2007	Mount Lemmon	Mount Lemmon Survey	·	2.6 km	MPC; JPL
707529	2011 GM_{87}	—	April 6, 2011	Mount Lemmon	Mount Lemmon Survey	·	3.2 km	MPC; JPL
707530	2011 GO_{87}	—	November 11, 2001	Apache Point	SDSS Collaboration	·	2.6 km	MPC; JPL
707531	2011 GN_{91}	—	May 27, 2012	Mount Lemmon	Mount Lemmon Survey	LIX	3.0 km	MPC; JPL
707532	2011 GU_{91}	—	April 1, 2011	Mount Lemmon	Mount Lemmon Survey	EOS	1.7 km	MPC; JPL
707533	2011 GH_{92}	—	February 10, 2016	Haleakala	Pan-STARRS 1	(895)	3.3 km	MPC; JPL
707534	2011 GZ_{92}	—	October 29, 2014	Haleakala	Pan-STARRS 1	EOS	1.7 km	MPC; JPL
707535	2011 GG_{94}	—	September 14, 2013	Haleakala	Pan-STARRS 1	·	3.2 km	MPC; JPL
707536	2011 GQ_{95}	—	November 8, 1996	Kitt Peak	Spacewatch	·	3.2 km	MPC; JPL
707537	2011 GP_{96}	—	January 21, 2015	Haleakala	Pan-STARRS 1	·	1.2 km	MPC; JPL
707538	2011 GH_{101}	—	April 1, 2011	Mount Lemmon	Mount Lemmon Survey	EUN	770 m	MPC; JPL
707539	2011 GP_{101}	—	September 18, 2001	Apache Point	SDSS Collaboration	V	600 m	MPC; JPL
707540	2011 GV_{102}	—	April 1, 2011	Kitt Peak	Spacewatch	·	790 m	MPC; JPL
707541	2011 GE_{109}	—	April 6, 2011	Mount Lemmon	Mount Lemmon Survey	·	1.3 km	MPC; JPL
707542	2011 HV_{2}	—	April 21, 2011	Haleakala	Pan-STARRS 1	·	2.9 km	MPC; JPL
707543	2011 HC_{4}	—	April 24, 2011	Haleakala	Pan-STARRS 1	T_{j} (2.92)	4.2 km	MPC; JPL
707544	2011 HP_{19}	—	April 26, 2011	Kitt Peak	Spacewatch	·	1.0 km	MPC; JPL
707545	2011 HR_{24}	—	April 23, 2011	Haleakala	Pan-STARRS 1	·	1.8 km	MPC; JPL
707546	2011 HJ_{41}	—	April 13, 2011	Mount Lemmon	Mount Lemmon Survey	·	2.7 km	MPC; JPL
707547	2011 HL_{42}	—	April 6, 2011	Mount Lemmon	Mount Lemmon Survey	VER	2.3 km	MPC; JPL
707548	2011 HZ_{45}	—	September 26, 2008	Kitt Peak	Spacewatch	·	1.4 km	MPC; JPL
707549	2011 HE_{46}	—	April 6, 2011	Mount Lemmon	Mount Lemmon Survey	VER	2.3 km	MPC; JPL
707550	2011 HO_{58}	—	May 13, 2007	Kitt Peak	Spacewatch	·	910 m	MPC; JPL
707551	2011 HP_{59}	—	April 26, 2011	Kitt Peak	Spacewatch	·	1.2 km	MPC; JPL
707552	2011 HQ_{61}	—	April 27, 2011	Kitt Peak	Spacewatch	H	290 m	MPC; JPL
707553	2011 HX_{61}	—	April 28, 2011	Haleakala	Pan-STARRS 1	·	1.2 km	MPC; JPL
707554	2011 HK_{68}	—	April 8, 2011	Kitt Peak	Spacewatch	NYS	1.2 km	MPC; JPL
707555	2011 HQ_{68}	—	September 15, 2007	Mount Lemmon	Mount Lemmon Survey	·	2.7 km	MPC; JPL
707556	2011 HY_{69}	—	March 11, 2007	Mount Lemmon	Mount Lemmon Survey	·	970 m	MPC; JPL
707557	2011 HJ_{70}	—	April 13, 2011	Kitt Peak	Spacewatch	·	830 m	MPC; JPL
707558	2011 HS_{72}	—	April 26, 2011	Kitt Peak	Spacewatch	EUN	930 m	MPC; JPL
707559	2011 HU_{82}	—	June 8, 2003	Kitt Peak	Spacewatch	·	1.1 km	MPC; JPL
707560	2011 HD_{83}	—	March 26, 2011	Haleakala	Pan-STARRS 1	·	3.4 km	MPC; JPL
707561	2011 HB_{92}	—	September 12, 2007	Mount Lemmon	Mount Lemmon Survey	THM	2.2 km	MPC; JPL
707562	2011 HM_{92}	—	September 28, 2008	Catalina	CSS	·	860 m	MPC; JPL
707563	2011 HY_{93}	—	April 26, 2011	Kitt Peak	Spacewatch	·	1.1 km	MPC; JPL
707564	2011 HT_{94}	—	April 6, 2011	Mount Lemmon	Mount Lemmon Survey	VER	2.5 km	MPC; JPL
707565	2011 HB_{96}	—	October 22, 2008	Kitt Peak	Spacewatch	·	2.7 km	MPC; JPL
707566	2011 HB_{105}	—	October 10, 2007	Catalina	CSS	·	3.2 km	MPC; JPL
707567	2011 HR_{105}	—	January 1, 2014	Haleakala	Pan-STARRS 1	KON	2.4 km	MPC; JPL
707568	2011 HA_{107}	—	November 30, 2014	Haleakala	Pan-STARRS 1	URS	2.9 km	MPC; JPL
707569	2011 HA_{109}	—	May 17, 2017	Haleakala	Pan-STARRS 1	·	2.3 km	MPC; JPL
707570	2011 HE_{110}	—	April 30, 2011	Mount Lemmon	Mount Lemmon Survey	·	1.1 km	MPC; JPL
707571	2011 JS	—	November 25, 2002	Palomar	NEAT	PHO	1.0 km	MPC; JPL
707572	2011 JG_{4}	—	January 29, 2003	Apache Point	SDSS Collaboration	ERI	1.3 km	MPC; JPL
707573	2011 JJ_{6}	—	April 22, 2011	Kitt Peak	Spacewatch	·	950 m	MPC; JPL
707574	2011 JE_{8}	—	September 20, 2008	Mount Lemmon	Mount Lemmon Survey	BAR	1.3 km	MPC; JPL
707575	2011 JH_{15}	—	May 11, 2011	Nogales	M. Schwartz, P. R. Holvorcem	·	2.0 km	MPC; JPL
707576	2011 JY_{18}	—	May 1, 2011	Haleakala	Pan-STARRS 1	·	2.7 km	MPC; JPL
707577	2011 JR_{31}	—	March 26, 2011	Haleakala	Pan-STARRS 1	·	2.9 km	MPC; JPL
707578	2011 JC_{33}	—	May 6, 2011	Mount Lemmon	Mount Lemmon Survey	·	1.1 km	MPC; JPL
707579	2011 JG_{35}	—	March 7, 2016	Haleakala	Pan-STARRS 1	·	2.8 km	MPC; JPL
707580	2011 JO_{35}	—	January 18, 2015	Mount Lemmon	Mount Lemmon Survey	·	2.9 km	MPC; JPL
707581	2011 JR_{36}	—	March 25, 2015	Haleakala	Pan-STARRS 1	·	970 m	MPC; JPL
707582	2011 KP_{1}	—	July 25, 2003	Palomar	NEAT	·	1.3 km	MPC; JPL
707583	2011 KT_{1}	—	April 30, 2011	Haleakala	Pan-STARRS 1	PHO	690 m	MPC; JPL
707584	2011 KD_{3}	—	March 4, 2005	Mauna Kea	F. Bernardi, D. J. Tholen	H	570 m	MPC; JPL
707585	2011 KC_{5}	—	November 11, 1999	Kitt Peak	Spacewatch	·	1.5 km	MPC; JPL
707586	2011 KY_{5}	—	March 10, 2005	Mount Lemmon	Mount Lemmon Survey	THM	2.4 km	MPC; JPL
707587	2011 KC_{6}	—	March 14, 2007	Kitt Peak	Spacewatch	·	1.0 km	MPC; JPL
707588	2011 KU_{9}	—	May 21, 2011	Mount Lemmon	Mount Lemmon Survey	·	1.4 km	MPC; JPL
707589	2011 KH_{10}	—	May 22, 2011	Mount Lemmon	Mount Lemmon Survey	·	1.3 km	MPC; JPL
707590	2011 KJ_{13}	—	April 13, 2011	Haleakala	Pan-STARRS 1	JUN	740 m	MPC; JPL
707591	2011 KN_{13}	—	May 24, 2011	Haleakala	Pan-STARRS 1	BAR	1.1 km	MPC; JPL
707592	2011 KK_{14}	—	May 22, 2011	Mount Lemmon	Mount Lemmon Survey	·	1.2 km	MPC; JPL
707593	2011 KO_{19}	—	December 4, 2008	Kitt Peak	Spacewatch	VER	2.5 km	MPC; JPL
707594	2011 KC_{23}	—	May 21, 2011	Haleakala	Pan-STARRS 1	·	1.1 km	MPC; JPL
707595	2011 KW_{27}	—	May 24, 2011	Nogales	M. Schwartz, P. R. Holvorcem	EUN	1.1 km	MPC; JPL
707596	2011 KA_{32}	—	May 31, 2011	Mount Lemmon	Mount Lemmon Survey	H	500 m	MPC; JPL
707597	2011 KO_{32}	—	May 31, 2011	Mount Lemmon	Mount Lemmon Survey	·	1.6 km	MPC; JPL
707598	2011 KS_{32}	—	May 13, 2011	Mount Lemmon	Mount Lemmon Survey	·	770 m	MPC; JPL
707599	2011 KZ_{40}	—	May 24, 2011	Haleakala	Pan-STARRS 1	MAR	840 m	MPC; JPL
707600	2011 KN_{43}	—	May 13, 2007	Kitt Peak	Spacewatch	·	980 m	MPC; JPL

== 707601–707700 ==
back to top

Designation			Discovery			Properties		Ref
Permanent	Provisional	Named after	Date	Site	Discoverer(s)	Category	Diam.	Ref
707601	2011 KC_{44}	—	October 6, 2008	Kitt Peak	Spacewatch	·	890 m	MPC; JPL
707602	2011 KO_{44}	—	November 3, 2008	Mount Lemmon	Mount Lemmon Survey	·	1.4 km	MPC; JPL
707603	2011 KY_{49}	—	May 24, 2011	Haleakala	Pan-STARRS 1	·	1.3 km	MPC; JPL
707604	2011 KS_{52}	—	May 26, 2015	Mount Lemmon	Mount Lemmon Survey	·	1.2 km	MPC; JPL
707605	2011 KE_{53}	—	July 9, 2018	Haleakala	Pan-STARRS 1	·	2.8 km	MPC; JPL
707606	2011 KH_{54}	—	May 26, 2011	Mount Lemmon	Mount Lemmon Survey	·	1.3 km	MPC; JPL
707607	2011 KO_{54}	—	April 7, 2014	Mount Lemmon	Mount Lemmon Survey	·	510 m	MPC; JPL
707608	2011 KR_{54}	—	November 26, 2013	Mount Lemmon	Mount Lemmon Survey	·	2.4 km	MPC; JPL
707609	2011 KD_{55}	—	April 5, 2014	Haleakala	Pan-STARRS 1	·	580 m	MPC; JPL
707610	2011 KZ_{55}	—	May 24, 2011	Haleakala	Pan-STARRS 1	·	1.4 km	MPC; JPL
707611	2011 KB_{56}	—	May 31, 2011	Mount Lemmon	Mount Lemmon Survey	·	1.4 km	MPC; JPL
707612	2011 KH_{56}	—	May 24, 2011	Haleakala	Pan-STARRS 1	·	980 m	MPC; JPL
707613	2011 KT_{56}	—	May 24, 2011	Haleakala	Pan-STARRS 1	·	930 m	MPC; JPL
707614	2011 KG_{57}	—	May 21, 2011	Haleakala	Pan-STARRS 1	·	560 m	MPC; JPL
707615	2011 KZ_{57}	—	May 31, 2011	Mount Lemmon	Mount Lemmon Survey	·	1.6 km	MPC; JPL
707616	2011 KN_{59}	—	May 22, 2011	Mount Lemmon	Mount Lemmon Survey	·	830 m	MPC; JPL
707617	2011 KJ_{60}	—	May 28, 2011	Kitt Peak	Spacewatch	·	1.7 km	MPC; JPL
707618	2011 KN_{60}	—	March 13, 2007	Mount Lemmon	Mount Lemmon Survey	·	860 m	MPC; JPL
707619	2011 LE_{4}	—	May 7, 2011	Kitt Peak	Spacewatch	·	960 m	MPC; JPL
707620	2011 LJ_{8}	—	June 5, 2011	Mount Lemmon	Mount Lemmon Survey	L5 · (291316)	10 km	MPC; JPL
707621	2011 LU_{8}	—	May 22, 2011	Kitt Peak	Spacewatch	·	1.2 km	MPC; JPL
707622	2011 LE_{9}	—	June 5, 2011	Mount Lemmon	Mount Lemmon Survey	·	1.2 km	MPC; JPL
707623	2011 LV_{11}	—	June 6, 2011	Haleakala	Pan-STARRS 1	·	900 m	MPC; JPL
707624	2011 LY_{11}	—	May 31, 2011	Mount Lemmon	Mount Lemmon Survey	(5)	820 m	MPC; JPL
707625	2011 LB_{12}	—	June 6, 2011	Haleakala	Pan-STARRS 1	·	940 m	MPC; JPL
707626	2011 LC_{15}	—	May 14, 2011	Mount Lemmon	Mount Lemmon Survey	·	2.7 km	MPC; JPL
707627	2011 LE_{16}	—	June 8, 2011	Mount Lemmon	Mount Lemmon Survey	EUN	1.1 km	MPC; JPL
707628	2011 LO_{18}	—	June 5, 2011	Kitt Peak	Spacewatch	·	1.4 km	MPC; JPL
707629	2011 LB_{20}	—	June 9, 2011	Mount Lemmon	Mount Lemmon Survey	·	1.7 km	MPC; JPL
707630	2011 LA_{25}	—	May 14, 2011	Mount Lemmon	Mount Lemmon Survey	·	910 m	MPC; JPL
707631	2011 LF_{25}	—	May 21, 2011	Haleakala	Pan-STARRS 1	EUN	870 m	MPC; JPL
707632	2011 LF_{26}	—	September 29, 2008	Mount Lemmon	Mount Lemmon Survey	·	980 m	MPC; JPL
707633	2011 LB_{27}	—	June 3, 2011	Catalina	CSS	·	1.3 km	MPC; JPL
707634	2011 LQ_{28}	—	October 11, 2012	Haleakala	Pan-STARRS 1	(5)	1.3 km	MPC; JPL
707635	2011 LG_{29}	—	June 7, 2011	Mount Lemmon	Mount Lemmon Survey	EUN	1.3 km	MPC; JPL
707636	2011 LM_{29}	—	October 10, 2012	Haleakala	Pan-STARRS 1	·	1.4 km	MPC; JPL
707637	2011 LR_{29}	—	January 25, 2014	Haleakala	Pan-STARRS 1	·	1.2 km	MPC; JPL
707638	2011 LK_{30}	—	July 9, 2016	Haleakala	Pan-STARRS 1	·	1.9 km	MPC; JPL
707639	2011 LR_{30}	—	June 2, 2011	Siding Spring	SSS	BAR	1.2 km	MPC; JPL
707640	2011 LD_{31}	—	August 9, 2016	Haleakala	Pan-STARRS 1	·	1.1 km	MPC; JPL
707641	2011 LN_{32}	—	August 31, 2017	Mount Lemmon	Mount Lemmon Survey	·	2.7 km	MPC; JPL
707642	2011 LS_{33}	—	April 3, 2016	Haleakala	Pan-STARRS 1	·	2.8 km	MPC; JPL
707643	2011 LT_{33}	—	April 23, 2015	Haleakala	Pan-STARRS 1	·	1.0 km	MPC; JPL
707644	2011 LX_{34}	—	June 11, 2011	Haleakala	Pan-STARRS 1	526	2.3 km	MPC; JPL
707645	2011 MQ	—	June 23, 2011	Mount Lemmon	Mount Lemmon Survey	H	380 m	MPC; JPL
707646	2011 MP_{6}	—	June 20, 2011	Nogales	M. Schwartz, P. R. Holvorcem	·	1.2 km	MPC; JPL
707647	2011 MR_{8}	—	May 24, 2011	Mount Lemmon	Mount Lemmon Survey	PHO	910 m	MPC; JPL
707648	2011 MW_{9}	—	June 30, 2011	Haleakala	Pan-STARRS 1	·	1.4 km	MPC; JPL
707649	2011 MA_{13}	—	June 29, 2011	Charleston	R. Holmes	EUN	1.4 km	MPC; JPL
707650	2011 MO_{13}	—	November 5, 2016	Mount Lemmon	Mount Lemmon Survey	·	1.1 km	MPC; JPL
707651	2011 MD_{16}	—	June 27, 2011	Mount Lemmon	Mount Lemmon Survey	3:2	4.4 km	MPC; JPL
707652	2011 NQ_{3}	—	July 5, 2011	Haleakala	Pan-STARRS 1	·	1.0 km	MPC; JPL
707653	2011 NC_{6}	—	July 7, 2011	Charleston	R. Holmes	·	1.1 km	MPC; JPL
707654	2011 NG_{6}	—	July 1, 2011	Mount Lemmon	Mount Lemmon Survey	·	1.2 km	MPC; JPL
707655	2011 OO_{2}	—	July 23, 2011	Haleakala	Pan-STARRS 1	·	2.1 km	MPC; JPL
707656	2011 OR_{2}	—	July 23, 2011	Haleakala	Pan-STARRS 1	EUN	1.1 km	MPC; JPL
707657	2011 OV_{4}	—	July 25, 2011	La Sagra	OAM	AMO	670 m	MPC; JPL
707658	2011 OU_{7}	—	August 28, 2003	Palomar	NEAT	·	1.4 km	MPC; JPL
707659	2011 OV_{7}	—	September 9, 2008	Kitt Peak	Spacewatch	·	600 m	MPC; JPL
707660	2011 OH_{10}	—	September 13, 2007	Catalina	CSS	(1547)	1.6 km	MPC; JPL
707661	2011 OR_{10}	—	July 25, 2011	Haleakala	Pan-STARRS 1	·	2.4 km	MPC; JPL
707662	2011 OS_{13}	—	April 10, 2002	Palomar	NEAT	(194)	1.4 km	MPC; JPL
707663	2011 OO_{15}	—	July 26, 2011	Haleakala	Pan-STARRS 1	EUN	1.1 km	MPC; JPL
707664	2011 OK_{21}	—	July 25, 2011	Haleakala	Pan-STARRS 1	EOS	1.9 km	MPC; JPL
707665	2011 OU_{21}	—	September 28, 1994	Kitt Peak	Spacewatch	·	1.2 km	MPC; JPL
707666	2011 OL_{22}	—	August 24, 2007	Kitt Peak	Spacewatch	·	1.2 km	MPC; JPL
707667	2011 OX_{27}	—	July 4, 2003	Kitt Peak	Spacewatch	·	1.1 km	MPC; JPL
707668	2011 OL_{30}	—	September 20, 2003	Kitt Peak	Spacewatch	·	1.4 km	MPC; JPL
707669	2011 OQ_{31}	—	July 31, 2011	Haleakala	Pan-STARRS 1	JUN	800 m	MPC; JPL
707670	2011 OZ_{31}	—	January 11, 2010	Kitt Peak	Spacewatch	·	650 m	MPC; JPL
707671	2011 OM_{37}	—	August 1, 2011	Haleakala	Pan-STARRS 1	·	920 m	MPC; JPL
707672	2011 OL_{39}	—	August 1, 2011	Haleakala	Pan-STARRS 1	·	1.8 km	MPC; JPL
707673	2011 OE_{40}	—	February 25, 2006	Kitt Peak	Spacewatch	·	990 m	MPC; JPL
707674	2011 OG_{40}	—	July 26, 2011	Haleakala	Pan-STARRS 1	·	1.0 km	MPC; JPL
707675	2011 OL_{46}	—	June 27, 2011	Mount Lemmon	Mount Lemmon Survey	·	2.6 km	MPC; JPL
707676	2011 OF_{50}	—	June 11, 2011	Mount Lemmon	Mount Lemmon Survey	·	1.1 km	MPC; JPL
707677	2011 OP_{50}	—	July 31, 2011	Haleakala	Pan-STARRS 1	·	2.5 km	MPC; JPL
707678	2011 OH_{54}	—	July 26, 2011	Haleakala	Pan-STARRS 1	EOS	1.6 km	MPC; JPL
707679	2011 ON_{54}	—	July 26, 2011	Haleakala	Pan-STARRS 1	·	1.6 km	MPC; JPL
707680	2011 OY_{55}	—	July 27, 2011	Haleakala	Pan-STARRS 1	·	1.4 km	MPC; JPL
707681	2011 OL_{59}	—	August 27, 2011	Haleakala	Pan-STARRS 1	·	1.3 km	MPC; JPL
707682	2011 OO_{59}	—	August 29, 2011	Siding Spring	SSS	TIR	2.9 km	MPC; JPL
707683	2011 OU_{59}	—	September 21, 2011	Mount Lemmon	Mount Lemmon Survey	·	1.7 km	MPC; JPL
707684	2011 OY_{59}	—	April 15, 2010	Mount Lemmon	Mount Lemmon Survey	AGN	920 m	MPC; JPL
707685	2011 OJ_{61}	—	October 15, 2012	Mount Lemmon SkyCe	Kostin, A.	·	1.6 km	MPC; JPL
707686	2011 ON_{61}	—	November 22, 2012	Kitt Peak	Spacewatch	·	1.2 km	MPC; JPL
707687	2011 OC_{62}	—	April 5, 2014	Haleakala	Pan-STARRS 1	EUN	1.1 km	MPC; JPL
707688	2011 OG_{62}	—	July 28, 2011	Haleakala	Pan-STARRS 1	·	1.3 km	MPC; JPL
707689	2011 OB_{63}	—	February 24, 2014	Haleakala	Pan-STARRS 1	HNS	760 m	MPC; JPL
707690	2011 OQ_{63}	—	November 3, 2015	Mount Lemmon	Mount Lemmon Survey	·	510 m	MPC; JPL
707691	2011 OB_{67}	—	April 18, 2015	Cerro Tololo	DECam	·	1.6 km	MPC; JPL
707692	2011 OA_{68}	—	September 25, 2017	Haleakala	Pan-STARRS 1	·	1.7 km	MPC; JPL
707693	2011 OU_{70}	—	July 31, 2011	Haleakala	Pan-STARRS 1	·	1.4 km	MPC; JPL
707694	2011 OD_{71}	—	October 9, 2007	Kitt Peak	Spacewatch	·	1.6 km	MPC; JPL
707695	2011 OD_{73}	—	September 13, 2007	Catalina	CSS	·	1.5 km	MPC; JPL
707696	2011 OJ_{73}	—	July 28, 2011	Haleakala	Pan-STARRS 1	·	540 m	MPC; JPL
707697	2011 OO_{73}	—	July 25, 2011	Haleakala	Pan-STARRS 1	·	3.7 km	MPC; JPL
707698	2011 OP_{73}	—	July 28, 2011	Haleakala	Pan-STARRS 1	·	1.3 km	MPC; JPL
707699	2011 OW_{74}	—	July 27, 2011	Haleakala	Pan-STARRS 1	·	490 m	MPC; JPL
707700	2011 PR_{2}	—	August 1, 2011	Haleakala	Pan-STARRS 1	·	1.2 km	MPC; JPL

== 707701–707800 ==
back to top

Designation			Discovery			Properties		Ref
Permanent	Provisional	Named after	Date	Site	Discoverer(s)	Category	Diam.	Ref
707701	2011 PC_{4}	—	August 2, 2011	Haleakala	Pan-STARRS 1	NYS	1.0 km	MPC; JPL
707702	2011 PH_{5}	—	July 25, 2011	Haleakala	Pan-STARRS 1	·	1.4 km	MPC; JPL
707703	2011 PL_{5}	—	December 21, 2008	Kitt Peak	Spacewatch	·	1.7 km	MPC; JPL
707704	2011 PO_{7}	—	August 6, 2011	Haleakala	Pan-STARRS 1	·	450 m	MPC; JPL
707705	2011 PV_{7}	—	August 6, 2011	Haleakala	Pan-STARRS 1	·	2.4 km	MPC; JPL
707706	2011 PT_{8}	—	August 6, 2011	Haleakala	Pan-STARRS 1	·	1.2 km	MPC; JPL
707707	2011 PA_{9}	—	August 10, 2011	Haleakala	Pan-STARRS 1	AGN	980 m	MPC; JPL
707708	2011 PT_{9}	—	September 19, 2007	Kitt Peak	Spacewatch	·	1.2 km	MPC; JPL
707709	2011 PT_{10}	—	August 1, 2011	Haleakala	Pan-STARRS 1	EUN	1.1 km	MPC; JPL
707710	2011 PL_{12}	—	August 3, 2011	Haleakala	Pan-STARRS 1	·	1.3 km	MPC; JPL
707711	2011 PK_{16}	—	August 10, 2011	Piszkés-tető	K. Sárneczky, A. Pál	·	1.6 km	MPC; JPL
707712	2011 PM_{16}	—	August 1, 2011	Siding Spring	SSS	·	1.3 km	MPC; JPL
707713	2011 PX_{16}	—	October 14, 2012	Mount Lemmon	Mount Lemmon Survey	·	2.2 km	MPC; JPL
707714	2011 PZ_{16}	—	October 19, 2012	Mount Lemmon	Mount Lemmon Survey	·	2.3 km	MPC; JPL
707715	2011 PL_{17}	—	July 9, 2016	Haleakala	Pan-STARRS 1	·	1.8 km	MPC; JPL
707716	2011 PR_{18}	—	January 25, 2014	Haleakala	Pan-STARRS 1	·	1.6 km	MPC; JPL
707717	2011 PN_{19}	—	August 1, 2011	Haleakala	Pan-STARRS 1	EOS	1.7 km	MPC; JPL
707718	2011 PU_{19}	—	October 1, 2017	Haleakala	Pan-STARRS 1	·	2.2 km	MPC; JPL
707719	2011 PL_{20}	—	November 26, 2014	Mount Lemmon	Mount Lemmon Survey	L5	8.9 km	MPC; JPL
707720	2011 PU_{20}	—	August 10, 2011	Haleakala	Pan-STARRS 1	KOR	1.0 km	MPC; JPL
707721	2011 PA_{21}	—	August 5, 2011	ESA OGS	ESA OGS	·	2.5 km	MPC; JPL
707722	2011 PD_{22}	—	August 7, 2011	Calar Alto-CASADO	Mottola, S.	·	1.2 km	MPC; JPL
707723	2011 QU_{3}	—	August 18, 2011	Haleakala	Pan-STARRS 1	HNS	1.1 km	MPC; JPL
707724	2011 QB_{7}	—	August 22, 2011	Haleakala	Pan-STARRS 1	EUN	1.1 km	MPC; JPL
707725	2011 QG_{13}	—	October 9, 2007	Catalina	CSS	·	1.9 km	MPC; JPL
707726	2011 QC_{15}	—	August 23, 2011	Haleakala	Pan-STARRS 1	·	2.2 km	MPC; JPL
707727	2011 QE_{15}	—	February 5, 2009	Kitt Peak	Spacewatch	·	1.9 km	MPC; JPL
707728	2011 QQ_{20}	—	August 23, 2011	Haleakala	Pan-STARRS 1	·	1.7 km	MPC; JPL
707729	2011 QJ_{25}	—	August 20, 2011	Haleakala	Pan-STARRS 1	·	1.6 km	MPC; JPL
707730	2011 QV_{25}	—	August 20, 2011	Haleakala	Pan-STARRS 1	·	2.7 km	MPC; JPL
707731	2011 QL_{27}	—	April 2, 2006	Mount Lemmon	Mount Lemmon Survey	JUN	980 m	MPC; JPL
707732	2011 QO_{28}	—	July 28, 2011	Haleakala	Pan-STARRS 1	EOS	1.5 km	MPC; JPL
707733	2011 QM_{29}	—	June 22, 2015	Haleakala	Pan-STARRS 1	·	1.7 km	MPC; JPL
707734	2011 QO_{29}	—	August 23, 2011	La Sagra	OAM	·	500 m	MPC; JPL
707735	2011 QU_{29}	—	October 21, 2008	Kitt Peak	Spacewatch	·	540 m	MPC; JPL
707736	2011 QQ_{30}	—	October 9, 2007	Mount Lemmon	Mount Lemmon Survey	·	1.6 km	MPC; JPL
707737	2011 QS_{31}	—	August 25, 2011	Mayhill-ISON	L. Elenin	EUN	1.2 km	MPC; JPL
707738	2011 QO_{32}	—	August 6, 2002	Palomar	NEAT	·	1.3 km	MPC; JPL
707739	2011 QP_{33}	—	December 21, 2008	Mount Lemmon	Mount Lemmon Survey	·	900 m	MPC; JPL
707740	2011 QW_{34}	—	August 7, 2011	La Sagra	OAM	EUN	1.3 km	MPC; JPL
707741	2011 QE_{43}	—	January 1, 2009	Mount Lemmon	Mount Lemmon Survey	·	1.5 km	MPC; JPL
707742	2011 QE_{45}	—	August 28, 2011	Haleakala	Pan-STARRS 1	EUN	1.0 km	MPC; JPL
707743	2011 QT_{45}	—	August 28, 2011	Zelenchukskaya Station	Satovski, B.	·	2.4 km	MPC; JPL
707744	2011 QC_{47}	—	August 30, 2011	Kitt Peak	Spacewatch	EOS	1.5 km	MPC; JPL
707745	2011 QN_{48}	—	September 10, 2007	Catalina	CSS	·	1.9 km	MPC; JPL
707746	2011 QN_{49}	—	August 23, 1998	Kitt Peak	Spacewatch	EUN	1 km	MPC; JPL
707747	2011 QQ_{53}	—	July 28, 2011	Haleakala	Pan-STARRS 1	·	1.4 km	MPC; JPL
707748	2011 QL_{58}	—	October 11, 2007	Mount Lemmon	Mount Lemmon Survey	·	1.2 km	MPC; JPL
707749	2011 QA_{59}	—	November 13, 2007	Kitt Peak	Spacewatch	·	1.6 km	MPC; JPL
707750	2011 QV_{65}	—	August 24, 2011	Haleakala	Pan-STARRS 1	·	1.5 km	MPC; JPL
707751	2011 QW_{66}	—	August 26, 2011	Haleakala	Pan-STARRS 1	ADE	1.4 km	MPC; JPL
707752	2011 QH_{67}	—	August 27, 2011	Andrushivka	Y. Ivaščenko, Kyrylenko, P.	·	1.8 km	MPC; JPL
707753	2011 QM_{67}	—	August 20, 2011	Haleakala	Pan-STARRS 1	HNS	1.2 km	MPC; JPL
707754	2011 QG_{69}	—	August 23, 2011	Andrushivka	Y. Ivaščenko, Kyrylenko, P.	·	1.5 km	MPC; JPL
707755	2011 QQ_{71}	—	August 28, 2011	Haleakala	Pan-STARRS 1	·	1.4 km	MPC; JPL
707756	2011 QJ_{73}	—	March 18, 2009	Kitt Peak	Spacewatch	·	1.4 km	MPC; JPL
707757	2011 QP_{73}	—	August 20, 2011	Haleakala	Pan-STARRS 1	·	1.8 km	MPC; JPL
707758	2011 QH_{75}	—	July 28, 2011	Haleakala	Pan-STARRS 1	·	1.3 km	MPC; JPL
707759	2011 QC_{76}	—	August 23, 2011	Mayhill-ISON	L. Elenin	·	1.7 km	MPC; JPL
707760	2011 QY_{78}	—	August 23, 2011	Haleakala	Pan-STARRS 1	·	1.3 km	MPC; JPL
707761	2011 QX_{79}	—	August 23, 2011	Haleakala	Pan-STARRS 1	·	1.3 km	MPC; JPL
707762	2011 QK_{81}	—	January 20, 2009	Catalina	CSS	·	1.8 km	MPC; JPL
707763	2011 QE_{82}	—	April 25, 2004	Kitt Peak	Spacewatch	·	500 m	MPC; JPL
707764	2011 QG_{83}	—	October 8, 2002	Kitt Peak	Spacewatch	AGN	880 m	MPC; JPL
707765	2011 QY_{83}	—	February 1, 2005	Kitt Peak	Spacewatch	·	1.8 km	MPC; JPL
707766	2011 QK_{84}	—	August 24, 2011	Haleakala	Pan-STARRS 1	EUN	1.1 km	MPC; JPL
707767	2011 QF_{92}	—	August 30, 2011	Haleakala	Pan-STARRS 1	·	2.1 km	MPC; JPL
707768	2011 QY_{95}	—	August 30, 2011	Haleakala	Pan-STARRS 1	·	1.4 km	MPC; JPL
707769	2011 QY_{99}	—	January 31, 2009	Mount Lemmon	Mount Lemmon Survey	·	1.8 km	MPC; JPL
707770	2011 QW_{101}	—	December 23, 2012	Haleakala	Pan-STARRS 1	·	1.5 km	MPC; JPL
707771	2011 QH_{102}	—	October 7, 2016	Mount Lemmon	Mount Lemmon Survey	·	1.3 km	MPC; JPL
707772	2011 QO_{105}	—	August 22, 2011	La Sagra	OAM	EUN	1.1 km	MPC; JPL
707773	2011 QC_{108}	—	November 5, 2016	Mount Lemmon	Mount Lemmon Survey	·	1.6 km	MPC; JPL
707774	2011 QT_{108}	—	August 20, 2011	Haleakala	Pan-STARRS 1	THM	1.6 km	MPC; JPL
707775	2011 QG_{110}	—	August 23, 2011	Haleakala	Pan-STARRS 1	L5	7.6 km	MPC; JPL
707776	2011 QN_{111}	—	August 20, 2011	Haleakala	Pan-STARRS 1	·	1.7 km	MPC; JPL
707777	2011 QQ_{111}	—	August 23, 2011	Haleakala	Pan-STARRS 1	·	1.6 km	MPC; JPL
707778	2011 QJ_{112}	—	August 21, 2011	Haleakala	Pan-STARRS 1	EUN	900 m	MPC; JPL
707779	2011 QT_{112}	—	August 28, 2011	Haleakala	Pan-STARRS 1	·	1.1 km	MPC; JPL
707780	2011 QU_{112}	—	August 24, 2011	Haleakala	Pan-STARRS 1	HNS	950 m	MPC; JPL
707781	2011 QS_{114}	—	August 31, 2011	Haleakala	Pan-STARRS 1	·	1.0 km	MPC; JPL
707782	2011 QV_{114}	—	August 24, 2011	Haleakala	Pan-STARRS 1	·	1.3 km	MPC; JPL
707783	2011 QE_{115}	—	August 31, 2011	Haleakala	Pan-STARRS 1	·	1.6 km	MPC; JPL
707784	2011 RU_{2}	—	November 9, 2004	Mauna Kea	Veillet, C.	NYS	980 m	MPC; JPL
707785	2011 RE_{7}	—	September 5, 2011	Haleakala	Pan-STARRS 1	KOR	1.0 km	MPC; JPL
707786	2011 RO_{10}	—	May 18, 2002	Palomar	NEAT	·	1.1 km	MPC; JPL
707787	2011 RA_{11}	—	September 4, 2011	Haleakala	Pan-STARRS 1	·	560 m	MPC; JPL
707788	2011 RE_{13}	—	September 8, 2011	Haleakala	Pan-STARRS 1	·	1.2 km	MPC; JPL
707789	2011 RA_{14}	—	September 2, 2011	Haleakala	Pan-STARRS 1	H	450 m	MPC; JPL
707790	2011 RQ_{15}	—	November 16, 2003	Apache Point	SDSS Collaboration	·	1.0 km	MPC; JPL
707791	2011 RO_{20}	—	September 4, 2011	Haleakala	Pan-STARRS 1	·	1.8 km	MPC; JPL
707792	2011 RE_{25}	—	September 7, 2011	Kitt Peak	Spacewatch	·	1.6 km	MPC; JPL
707793	2011 RG_{26}	—	September 4, 2011	Haleakala	Pan-STARRS 1	·	1.3 km	MPC; JPL
707794	2011 RS_{27}	—	September 4, 2011	Haleakala	Pan-STARRS 1	·	1.4 km	MPC; JPL
707795	2011 RH_{29}	—	September 4, 2011	Haleakala	Pan-STARRS 1	HOF	2.2 km	MPC; JPL
707796	2011 RD_{31}	—	September 8, 2011	Kitt Peak	Spacewatch	AGN	1 km	MPC; JPL
707797	2011 RQ_{31}	—	September 2, 2011	Haleakala	Pan-STARRS 1	·	1.3 km	MPC; JPL
707798	2011 RY_{31}	—	September 4, 2011	Haleakala	Pan-STARRS 1	·	1.7 km	MPC; JPL
707799	2011 RZ_{31}	—	September 4, 2011	Haleakala	Pan-STARRS 1	·	1.3 km	MPC; JPL
707800	2011 RH_{32}	—	September 4, 2011	Haleakala	Pan-STARRS 1	·	1.3 km	MPC; JPL

== 707801–707900 ==
back to top

Designation			Discovery			Properties		Ref
Permanent	Provisional	Named after	Date	Site	Discoverer(s)	Category	Diam.	Ref
707801	2011 RG_{34}	—	September 8, 2011	Haleakala	Pan-STARRS 1	·	520 m	MPC; JPL
707802	2011 SM_{3}	—	August 23, 2011	Haleakala	Pan-STARRS 1	·	1.8 km	MPC; JPL
707803	2011 SY_{4}	—	September 25, 2006	Kitt Peak	Spacewatch	·	1.3 km	MPC; JPL
707804	2011 SA_{8}	—	August 27, 2011	Haleakala	Pan-STARRS 1	·	1.3 km	MPC; JPL
707805	2011 SK_{12}	—	September 19, 2011	Socorro	LINEAR	·	1.9 km	MPC; JPL
707806	2011 SE_{14}	—	August 30, 2011	Haleakala	Pan-STARRS 1	·	1.3 km	MPC; JPL
707807	2011 SM_{15}	—	August 30, 2011	Haleakala	Pan-STARRS 1	·	1.3 km	MPC; JPL
707808	2011 SL_{20}	—	September 4, 2002	Palomar	NEAT	·	1.5 km	MPC; JPL
707809	2011 SK_{21}	—	September 20, 2011	Haleakala	Pan-STARRS 1	·	1.9 km	MPC; JPL
707810	2011 SY_{26}	—	August 20, 2011	Haleakala	Pan-STARRS 1	·	1.5 km	MPC; JPL
707811	2011 SU_{38}	—	November 3, 2007	Kitt Peak	Spacewatch	·	1.4 km	MPC; JPL
707812	2011 SP_{40}	—	October 4, 2002	Anderson Mesa	LONEOS	·	1.6 km	MPC; JPL
707813	2011 SR_{41}	—	September 18, 2011	Mount Lemmon	Mount Lemmon Survey	AGN	970 m	MPC; JPL
707814	2011 SL_{45}	—	September 19, 2011	Mount Lemmon	Mount Lemmon Survey	·	880 m	MPC; JPL
707815	2011 SD_{46}	—	September 19, 2011	Mount Lemmon	Mount Lemmon Survey	·	1.3 km	MPC; JPL
707816	2011 SO_{48}	—	October 19, 2006	Kitt Peak	Deep Ecliptic Survey	HOF	1.9 km	MPC; JPL
707817	2011 SX_{50}	—	February 3, 2009	Kitt Peak	Spacewatch	·	1.5 km	MPC; JPL
707818	2011 SP_{52}	—	September 8, 2011	Kitt Peak	Spacewatch	·	1.4 km	MPC; JPL
707819	2011 SZ_{54}	—	February 20, 2009	Kitt Peak	Spacewatch	·	1.7 km	MPC; JPL
707820	2011 SB_{55}	—	September 23, 2011	Haleakala	Pan-STARRS 1	HOF	1.8 km	MPC; JPL
707821	2011 SP_{56}	—	September 23, 2011	Haleakala	Pan-STARRS 1	·	2.5 km	MPC; JPL
707822	2011 SZ_{56}	—	September 23, 2011	Haleakala	Pan-STARRS 1	WIT	700 m	MPC; JPL
707823	2011 SV_{58}	—	September 9, 2007	Kitt Peak	Spacewatch	·	1.1 km	MPC; JPL
707824	2011 SE_{59}	—	October 10, 2007	Mount Lemmon	Mount Lemmon Survey	·	1.1 km	MPC; JPL
707825	2011 SQ_{59}	—	April 7, 2006	Kitt Peak	Spacewatch	·	940 m	MPC; JPL
707826	2011 SS_{62}	—	August 23, 2011	La Sagra	OAM	JUN	1.0 km	MPC; JPL
707827	2011 SF_{66}	—	September 20, 2011	Haleakala	Pan-STARRS 1	·	1.5 km	MPC; JPL
707828	2011 SU_{66}	—	February 26, 2004	Kitt Peak	Deep Ecliptic Survey	·	1.6 km	MPC; JPL
707829	2011 SA_{70}	—	October 12, 2007	Mount Lemmon	Mount Lemmon Survey	·	1.6 km	MPC; JPL
707830	2011 SU_{72}	—	November 7, 2005	Mauna Kea	A. Boattini	·	510 m	MPC; JPL
707831	2011 SL_{73}	—	November 13, 2007	Kitt Peak	Spacewatch	·	1.3 km	MPC; JPL
707832	2011 SP_{75}	—	January 20, 2009	Kitt Peak	Spacewatch	·	1.4 km	MPC; JPL
707833	2011 SL_{81}	—	September 20, 2011	Mount Lemmon	Mount Lemmon Survey	·	1.3 km	MPC; JPL
707834	2011 SB_{83}	—	July 27, 2011	Haleakala	Pan-STARRS 1	MAR	880 m	MPC; JPL
707835	2011 SY_{85}	—	September 21, 2011	Kitt Peak	Spacewatch	·	1.7 km	MPC; JPL
707836	2011 SZ_{85}	—	September 21, 2011	Kitt Peak	Spacewatch	·	1.2 km	MPC; JPL
707837	2011 SB_{86}	—	September 21, 2011	Kitt Peak	Spacewatch	·	1.7 km	MPC; JPL
707838	2011 SZ_{89}	—	September 15, 2002	Palomar	NEAT	·	1.6 km	MPC; JPL
707839	2011 SQ_{91}	—	October 3, 2002	Socorro	LINEAR	·	1.8 km	MPC; JPL
707840	2011 SL_{92}	—	October 10, 2002	Palomar	NEAT	EUN	960 m	MPC; JPL
707841	2011 SK_{96}	—	December 10, 2005	Kitt Peak	Spacewatch	·	500 m	MPC; JPL
707842	2011 SU_{97}	—	September 21, 2011	Catalina	CSS	·	680 m	MPC; JPL
707843	2011 SR_{98}	—	February 22, 2009	Kitt Peak	Spacewatch	AGN	950 m	MPC; JPL
707844	2011 SV_{99}	—	October 11, 2006	Mauna Kea	D. D. Balam	AGN	1.1 km	MPC; JPL
707845	2011 SA_{104}	—	September 23, 2011	Kitt Peak	Spacewatch	·	1.7 km	MPC; JPL
707846	2011 SH_{105}	—	September 23, 2011	Kitt Peak	Spacewatch	·	1.9 km	MPC; JPL
707847	2011 SY_{110}	—	September 19, 2011	Catalina	CSS	(194)	1.7 km	MPC; JPL
707848	2011 SM_{119}	—	September 25, 2011	Les Engarouines	L. Bernasconi	·	1.9 km	MPC; JPL
707849	2011 SV_{122}	—	October 30, 2002	Palomar	NEAT	·	1.5 km	MPC; JPL
707850	2011 SV_{123}	—	August 27, 2006	Kitt Peak	Spacewatch	AGN	950 m	MPC; JPL
707851	2011 SK_{127}	—	September 23, 2011	Haleakala	Pan-STARRS 1	KOR	960 m	MPC; JPL
707852	2011 SM_{128}	—	September 4, 2002	Palomar	NEAT	·	1.6 km	MPC; JPL
707853	2011 SO_{130}	—	September 23, 2011	Haleakala	Pan-STARRS 1	·	1.6 km	MPC; JPL
707854	2011 SK_{138}	—	October 21, 2006	Kitt Peak	Spacewatch	·	2.1 km	MPC; JPL
707855	2011 SX_{139}	—	September 23, 2011	Haleakala	Pan-STARRS 1	KOR	1.1 km	MPC; JPL
707856	2011 ST_{145}	—	August 16, 2002	Kitt Peak	Spacewatch	·	1.6 km	MPC; JPL
707857	2011 ST_{147}	—	September 26, 2011	Mount Lemmon	Mount Lemmon Survey	·	1.4 km	MPC; JPL
707858	2011 SU_{147}	—	September 26, 2011	Mount Lemmon	Mount Lemmon Survey	·	470 m	MPC; JPL
707859	2011 SB_{148}	—	March 11, 2005	Mount Lemmon	Mount Lemmon Survey	·	1.4 km	MPC; JPL
707860	2011 SU_{149}	—	September 26, 2011	Haleakala	Pan-STARRS 1	·	1.3 km	MPC; JPL
707861	2011 SW_{156}	—	September 26, 2011	Haleakala	Pan-STARRS 1	·	1.3 km	MPC; JPL
707862	2011 SP_{159}	—	September 13, 2004	Palomar	NEAT	·	600 m	MPC; JPL
707863	2011 SE_{160}	—	March 8, 2008	Mount Lemmon	Mount Lemmon Survey	·	2.5 km	MPC; JPL
707864	2011 SB_{161}	—	September 23, 2011	Kitt Peak	Spacewatch	·	1.5 km	MPC; JPL
707865	2011 SN_{161}	—	December 29, 2008	Mount Lemmon	Mount Lemmon Survey	·	840 m	MPC; JPL
707866	2011 SJ_{162}	—	September 23, 2011	Kitt Peak	Spacewatch	·	2.2 km	MPC; JPL
707867	2011 SD_{164}	—	September 26, 2006	Kitt Peak	Spacewatch	·	1.7 km	MPC; JPL
707868	2011 SV_{164}	—	September 23, 2011	Haleakala	Pan-STARRS 1	·	840 m	MPC; JPL
707869	2011 SL_{169}	—	September 22, 2003	Kitt Peak	Spacewatch	·	1.5 km	MPC; JPL
707870	2011 SB_{171}	—	September 28, 2011	Mount Lemmon	Mount Lemmon Survey	·	1.9 km	MPC; JPL
707871	2011 SE_{171}	—	September 28, 2011	Mount Lemmon	Mount Lemmon Survey	·	2.7 km	MPC; JPL
707872	2011 SF_{172}	—	September 20, 2011	Mount Lemmon	Mount Lemmon Survey	DOR	2.1 km	MPC; JPL
707873	2011 SK_{178}	—	September 15, 1998	Kitt Peak	Spacewatch	·	650 m	MPC; JPL
707874	2011 SY_{184}	—	September 26, 2011	Kitt Peak	Spacewatch	·	1.5 km	MPC; JPL
707875	2011 SP_{193}	—	September 8, 2011	Kitt Peak	Spacewatch	·	1.4 km	MPC; JPL
707876	2011 SW_{193}	—	September 26, 2011	Haleakala	Pan-STARRS 1	·	1.6 km	MPC; JPL
707877	2011 SN_{195}	—	April 2, 2006	Kitt Peak	Spacewatch	(5)	1.2 km	MPC; JPL
707878	2011 SS_{199}	—	September 18, 2011	Mount Lemmon	Mount Lemmon Survey	·	1.3 km	MPC; JPL
707879	2011 SK_{202}	—	September 18, 2011	Mount Lemmon	Mount Lemmon Survey	·	1.3 km	MPC; JPL
707880	2011 SC_{205}	—	September 20, 2011	Kitt Peak	Spacewatch	·	2.0 km	MPC; JPL
707881	2011 SM_{207}	—	January 31, 2009	Kitt Peak	Spacewatch	EUN	1.1 km	MPC; JPL
707882	2011 SF_{208}	—	December 30, 2008	Mount Lemmon	Mount Lemmon Survey	EUN	1.2 km	MPC; JPL
707883	2011 SQ_{216}	—	April 8, 2010	Kitt Peak	Spacewatch	·	1.6 km	MPC; JPL
707884	2011 SE_{218}	—	October 20, 1998	Anderson Mesa	LONEOS	·	2.1 km	MPC; JPL
707885	2011 SP_{226}	—	September 23, 2011	Mayhill-ISON	L. Elenin	(2076)	610 m	MPC; JPL
707886	2011 SY_{226}	—	November 3, 2007	Kitt Peak	Spacewatch	·	1.6 km	MPC; JPL
707887	2011 SZ_{233}	—	October 1, 2011	Kitt Peak	Spacewatch	·	1.8 km	MPC; JPL
707888	2011 SF_{235}	—	September 23, 2011	Bergisch Gladbach	W. Bickel	·	1.4 km	MPC; JPL
707889	2011 SG_{238}	—	September 26, 2011	Mount Lemmon	Mount Lemmon Survey	·	550 m	MPC; JPL
707890	2011 SL_{239}	—	March 12, 2010	Kitt Peak	Spacewatch	·	740 m	MPC; JPL
707891	2011 SU_{239}	—	September 26, 2011	Mount Lemmon	Mount Lemmon Survey	·	1.2 km	MPC; JPL
707892	2011 SB_{245}	—	November 14, 2007	Kitt Peak	Spacewatch	·	1.4 km	MPC; JPL
707893	2011 SQ_{247}	—	March 10, 2010	La Sagra	OAM	H	500 m	MPC; JPL
707894	2011 SW_{247}	—	September 29, 2011	Catalina	CSS	·	1.2 km	MPC; JPL
707895	2011 SS_{251}	—	September 13, 2007	Mount Lemmon	Mount Lemmon Survey	·	940 m	MPC; JPL
707896	2011 SU_{252}	—	September 8, 2011	Kitt Peak	Spacewatch	·	1.5 km	MPC; JPL
707897	2011 SP_{254}	—	August 23, 2011	Haleakala	Pan-STARRS 1	·	850 m	MPC; JPL
707898	2011 SR_{255}	—	August 28, 2002	Palomar	NEAT	·	1.7 km	MPC; JPL
707899	2011 SM_{259}	—	October 31, 2002	Palomar	NEAT	·	1.7 km	MPC; JPL
707900	2011 ST_{261}	—	October 16, 2002	Palomar	NEAT	·	1.7 km	MPC; JPL

== 707901–708000 ==
back to top

Designation			Discovery			Properties		Ref
Permanent	Provisional	Named after	Date	Site	Discoverer(s)	Category	Diam.	Ref
707901	2011 SA_{262}	—	November 2, 2007	Kitt Peak	Spacewatch	·	1.7 km	MPC; JPL
707902	2011 SV_{264}	—	September 2, 2011	Haleakala	Pan-STARRS 1	·	1.6 km	MPC; JPL
707903	2011 SG_{265}	—	September 4, 2011	Kitt Peak	Spacewatch	·	1.5 km	MPC; JPL
707904	2011 SG_{269}	—	September 26, 1998	Kitt Peak	Spacewatch	HNS	1.1 km	MPC; JPL
707905	2011 SX_{279}	—	September 24, 2011	Haleakala	Pan-STARRS 1	·	1.5 km	MPC; JPL
707906	2011 SM_{280}	—	September 28, 2011	Kitt Peak	Spacewatch	·	1.7 km	MPC; JPL
707907	2011 SQ_{280}	—	August 18, 2006	Palomar	NEAT	·	1.7 km	MPC; JPL
707908	2011 SS_{281}	—	September 25, 2011	Haleakala	Pan-STARRS 1	·	1.5 km	MPC; JPL
707909	2011 SD_{282}	—	December 6, 2012	Mount Lemmon	Mount Lemmon Survey	·	2.7 km	MPC; JPL
707910	2011 ST_{282}	—	September 20, 2011	Kitt Peak	Spacewatch	·	1.9 km	MPC; JPL
707911	2011 SC_{284}	—	September 26, 2011	Haleakala	Pan-STARRS 1	HOF	2.2 km	MPC; JPL
707912	2011 SJ_{286}	—	October 27, 2016	Kitt Peak	Spacewatch	AEO	950 m	MPC; JPL
707913	2011 SX_{286}	—	September 24, 2011	Mount Lemmon	Mount Lemmon Survey	·	670 m	MPC; JPL
707914	2011 SK_{287}	—	September 24, 2011	Haleakala	Pan-STARRS 1	·	910 m	MPC; JPL
707915	2011 SQ_{287}	—	July 25, 2015	Haleakala	Pan-STARRS 1	·	1.6 km	MPC; JPL
707916	2011 SZ_{288}	—	September 23, 2011	Haleakala	Pan-STARRS 1	·	1.6 km	MPC; JPL
707917	2011 SJ_{289}	—	September 24, 2011	Mount Lemmon	Mount Lemmon Survey	·	1.8 km	MPC; JPL
707918	2011 SK_{290}	—	September 12, 2015	Haleakala	Pan-STARRS 1	·	920 m	MPC; JPL
707919	2011 SV_{295}	—	September 24, 2011	Haleakala	Pan-STARRS 1	·	1.4 km	MPC; JPL
707920	2011 SD_{297}	—	October 21, 2016	Mount Lemmon	Mount Lemmon Survey	AGN	870 m	MPC; JPL
707921	2011 SL_{297}	—	September 21, 2011	Mount Lemmon	Mount Lemmon Survey	HOF	2.2 km	MPC; JPL
707922	2011 SL_{298}	—	January 20, 2013	Kitt Peak	Spacewatch	HOF	2.2 km	MPC; JPL
707923	2011 SQ_{303}	—	September 27, 2016	Haleakala	Pan-STARRS 1	·	1.5 km	MPC; JPL
707924	2011 SQ_{304}	—	September 28, 2011	Mount Lemmon	Mount Lemmon Survey	·	1.3 km	MPC; JPL
707925	2011 ST_{306}	—	September 23, 2011	Haleakala	Pan-STARRS 1	AGN	950 m	MPC; JPL
707926	2011 SA_{308}	—	September 26, 2011	Mount Lemmon	Mount Lemmon Survey	·	1.1 km	MPC; JPL
707927	2011 SL_{308}	—	September 30, 2011	Kitt Peak	Spacewatch	HOF	2.1 km	MPC; JPL
707928	2011 SV_{309}	—	September 26, 2011	Haleakala	Pan-STARRS 1	615	1.0 km	MPC; JPL
707929	2011 SU_{310}	—	September 24, 2011	Haleakala	Pan-STARRS 1	·	2.4 km	MPC; JPL
707930	2011 SD_{312}	—	September 29, 2011	Hagen	Klein, M.	·	1.4 km	MPC; JPL
707931	2011 SM_{312}	—	September 30, 2011	Kitt Peak	Spacewatch	·	1.4 km	MPC; JPL
707932	2011 SN_{313}	—	September 21, 2011	Mount Lemmon	Mount Lemmon Survey	AGN	830 m	MPC; JPL
707933	2011 SQ_{313}	—	September 24, 2011	Haleakala	Pan-STARRS 1	·	1.6 km	MPC; JPL
707934	2011 SU_{313}	—	September 21, 2011	Mount Lemmon	Mount Lemmon Survey	AGN	960 m	MPC; JPL
707935	2011 SY_{313}	—	September 23, 2011	Kitt Peak	Spacewatch	·	1.8 km	MPC; JPL
707936	2011 SZ_{313}	—	September 23, 2011	Haleakala	Pan-STARRS 1	·	1.6 km	MPC; JPL
707937	2011 SB_{314}	—	September 25, 2011	Haleakala	Pan-STARRS 1	·	1.6 km	MPC; JPL
707938	2011 SD_{314}	—	September 20, 2011	Kitt Peak	Spacewatch	·	1.6 km	MPC; JPL
707939	2011 SH_{315}	—	September 20, 2011	Mount Lemmon	Mount Lemmon Survey	HOF	1.9 km	MPC; JPL
707940	2011 SP_{317}	—	September 23, 2011	Haleakala	Pan-STARRS 1	·	1.4 km	MPC; JPL
707941	2011 SW_{317}	—	September 25, 2011	Haleakala	Pan-STARRS 1	·	1.1 km	MPC; JPL
707942	2011 SU_{319}	—	September 20, 2011	Haleakala	Pan-STARRS 1	·	1.1 km	MPC; JPL
707943	2011 SZ_{320}	—	September 23, 2011	Haleakala	Pan-STARRS 1	·	1.3 km	MPC; JPL
707944	2011 SK_{321}	—	September 21, 2011	Mount Lemmon	Mount Lemmon Survey	PAD	1.1 km	MPC; JPL
707945	2011 SP_{321}	—	September 19, 2011	Mount Lemmon	Mount Lemmon Survey	·	1.5 km	MPC; JPL
707946	2011 SA_{322}	—	September 26, 2011	Kitt Peak	Spacewatch	·	1.5 km	MPC; JPL
707947	2011 SK_{322}	—	September 20, 2011	Mount Lemmon	Mount Lemmon Survey	HOF	1.7 km	MPC; JPL
707948	2011 SL_{322}	—	September 28, 2011	Mount Lemmon	Mount Lemmon Survey	·	1.4 km	MPC; JPL
707949	2011 SZ_{322}	—	September 20, 2011	Haleakala	Pan-STARRS 1	EUN	960 m	MPC; JPL
707950	2011 SM_{323}	—	September 23, 2011	Haleakala	Pan-STARRS 1	·	1.4 km	MPC; JPL
707951	2011 SQ_{323}	—	September 23, 2011	Kitt Peak	Spacewatch	·	1.7 km	MPC; JPL
707952	2011 SK_{326}	—	September 23, 2011	Haleakala	Pan-STARRS 1	·	1.3 km	MPC; JPL
707953	2011 SN_{328}	—	September 18, 2011	Mount Lemmon	Mount Lemmon Survey	·	940 m	MPC; JPL
707954	2011 SW_{330}	—	September 26, 2011	Haleakala	Pan-STARRS 1	·	1.7 km	MPC; JPL
707955	2011 SF_{332}	—	March 18, 2010	Mount Lemmon	Mount Lemmon Survey	·	490 m	MPC; JPL
707956	2011 SN_{333}	—	September 18, 2011	Mount Lemmon	Mount Lemmon Survey	·	1.3 km	MPC; JPL
707957	2011 SH_{338}	—	September 18, 2011	Mount Lemmon	Mount Lemmon Survey	·	1.2 km	MPC; JPL
707958	2011 SL_{339}	—	September 24, 2011	Haleakala	Pan-STARRS 1	·	1.6 km	MPC; JPL
707959	2011 SM_{339}	—	September 24, 2011	Mount Lemmon	Mount Lemmon Survey	·	2.1 km	MPC; JPL
707960	2011 SU_{343}	—	September 21, 2011	Mount Lemmon	Mount Lemmon Survey	·	1.2 km	MPC; JPL
707961	2011 SB_{346}	—	September 23, 2011	Haleakala	Pan-STARRS 1	HOF	2.0 km	MPC; JPL
707962	2011 SA_{354}	—	September 26, 2011	Haleakala	Pan-STARRS 1	NYS	680 m	MPC; JPL
707963	2011 SD_{355}	—	September 20, 2011	Haleakala	Pan-STARRS 1	EOS	1.2 km	MPC; JPL
707964	2011 SE_{355}	—	September 26, 2011	Haleakala	Pan-STARRS 1	·	2.0 km	MPC; JPL
707965	2011 SP_{359}	—	September 20, 2011	Haleakala	Pan-STARRS 1	L5	7.3 km	MPC; JPL
707966	2011 TJ_{4}	—	October 1, 2011	Piszkés-tető	K. Sárneczky, S. Kürti	EUN	1.0 km	MPC; JPL
707967	2011 TE_{5}	—	October 4, 2011	Piszkéstető	K. Sárneczky	BRA	1.5 km	MPC; JPL
707968	2011 TG_{7}	—	November 14, 2007	Kitt Peak	Spacewatch	·	1.3 km	MPC; JPL
707969	2011 TE_{9}	—	August 1, 2000	Socorro	LINEAR	·	930 m	MPC; JPL
707970	2011 TG_{9}	—	April 30, 2009	Kitt Peak	Spacewatch	·	3.3 km	MPC; JPL
707971	2011 TG_{15}	—	October 2, 2011	Mayhill-ISON	L. Elenin	·	1.7 km	MPC; JPL
707972	2011 TX_{17}	—	September 26, 2011	Mount Lemmon	Mount Lemmon Survey	·	1.2 km	MPC; JPL
707973	2011 TK_{21}	—	October 1, 2011	Kitt Peak	Spacewatch	HOF	1.9 km	MPC; JPL
707974	2011 TL_{21}	—	October 3, 2011	Mount Lemmon	Mount Lemmon Survey	NEM	1.8 km	MPC; JPL
707975	2011 TN_{21}	—	October 4, 2011	Les Engarouines	L. Bernasconi	·	1.3 km	MPC; JPL
707976	2011 TC_{23}	—	February 26, 2009	Kitt Peak	Spacewatch	·	1.5 km	MPC; JPL
707977	2011 TE_{23}	—	October 1, 2011	Kitt Peak	Spacewatch	KOR	940 m	MPC; JPL
707978	2011 UJ	—	October 6, 2002	Palomar	NEAT	·	1.6 km	MPC; JPL
707979	2011 UR_{1}	—	October 16, 2011	Kitt Peak	Spacewatch	·	1.5 km	MPC; JPL
707980	2011 UE_{2}	—	September 21, 2011	Kitt Peak	Spacewatch	·	2.1 km	MPC; JPL
707981	2011 UX_{7}	—	October 18, 2011	Mount Lemmon	Mount Lemmon Survey	·	2.1 km	MPC; JPL
707982	2011 UV_{10}	—	October 6, 2004	Palomar	NEAT	·	820 m	MPC; JPL
707983	2011 UN_{11}	—	September 2, 2011	Haleakala	Pan-STARRS 1	AGN	990 m	MPC; JPL
707984	2011 UY_{14}	—	October 17, 2011	Kitt Peak	Spacewatch	·	1.9 km	MPC; JPL
707985	2011 UD_{15}	—	October 17, 2011	Kitt Peak	Spacewatch	·	610 m	MPC; JPL
707986	2011 UK_{19}	—	November 17, 2007	Kitt Peak	Spacewatch	·	1.6 km	MPC; JPL
707987	2011 UY_{22}	—	November 8, 2007	Kitt Peak	Spacewatch	·	1.7 km	MPC; JPL
707988	2011 UN_{28}	—	October 20, 2006	Kitt Peak	Spacewatch	DOR	1.8 km	MPC; JPL
707989	2011 UK_{29}	—	October 17, 2011	Haleakala	Pan-STARRS 1	·	2.3 km	MPC; JPL
707990	2011 UC_{30}	—	August 30, 2006	Anderson Mesa	LONEOS	·	2.0 km	MPC; JPL
707991	2011 UT_{32}	—	September 11, 2002	Palomar	NEAT	EUN	1.3 km	MPC; JPL
707992	2011 UK_{33}	—	August 18, 2002	Palomar	NEAT	·	1.5 km	MPC; JPL
707993	2011 UK_{40}	—	March 13, 2010	Mount Lemmon	Mount Lemmon Survey	·	630 m	MPC; JPL
707994	2011 UO_{40}	—	September 28, 2011	Mount Lemmon	Mount Lemmon Survey	·	1.5 km	MPC; JPL
707995	2011 UP_{42}	—	September 23, 2011	Kitt Peak	Spacewatch	·	1.4 km	MPC; JPL
707996	2011 UJ_{43}	—	October 1, 2011	Kitt Peak	Spacewatch	V	480 m	MPC; JPL
707997	2011 UL_{43}	—	September 22, 2011	Kitt Peak	Spacewatch	·	1.3 km	MPC; JPL
707998	2011 UW_{46}	—	September 28, 2011	Mount Lemmon	Mount Lemmon Survey	·	560 m	MPC; JPL
707999	2011 UX_{49}	—	September 24, 2005	Kitt Peak	Spacewatch	·	2.6 km	MPC; JPL
708000	2011 UM_{50}	—	September 12, 2002	Palomar	NEAT	·	1.4 km	MPC; JPL

back to top

== Meaning of names ==
As minor planet discoveries are confirmed, they are given a permanent number by the IAU's Minor Planet Center (MPC), and the discoverers can then submit names for them, following the IAU's naming conventions. The list below concerns those minor planets in the specified number-range that have received names, and explains the meanings of those names.

Official naming citations of newly named small Solar System bodies are approved and published in a bulletin by IAU's Working Group for Small Bodies Nomenclature (WGSBN). Before May 2021, citations were published in MPC's Minor Planet Circulars for many decades. Recent citations can also be found on the JPL Small-Body Database (SBDB). Until his death in 2016, German astronomer Lutz D. Schmadel compiled these citations into the Dictionary of Minor Planet Names (DMP) and regularly updated the collection.

Based on Paul Herget's The Names of the Minor Planets, Schmadel also researched the unclear origin of numerous asteroids, most of which had been named prior to World War II. This article incorporates text from this source, which is in the public domain: SBDB New namings may only be added to this list below after official publication as the preannouncement of names is condemned. The WGSBN publishes a comprehensive guideline for the naming rules of non-cometary small Solar System bodies.

Named minor planet	Provisional	This minor planet was named for...	Ref; Catalog
707242 Denniscrabtree	2011 CE_{41}	Dennis Crabtree (born 1952), Canadian astrophysicist at the Herzberg Astronomy and Astrophysics Research Centre.	IAU · 707242
