= List of minor planets: 748001–749000 =

The following is a partial list of minor planets, running from minor-planet number 748001 through 749000, inclusive. The primary data for this and other partial lists is based on JPL's "Small-Body Orbital Elements" and data available from the Minor Planet Center. Critical list information is also provided by the MPC, unless otherwise specified from Lowell Observatory. A detailed description of the table's columns and additional sources are given on the main page including a complete list of every page in this series, and a statistical break-up on the dynamical classification of minor planets.

Also see the summary list of all named bodies in numerical and alphabetical order, and the corresponding naming citations for the number range of this particular list. New namings may only be added to this list after official publication, as the preannouncement of names is condemned by the Working Group for Small Bodies Nomenclature of the International Astronomical Union.

Near-Earth obj.	MBA (inner)	MBA (outer)	Centaur
Mars-crosser	MBA (middle)	Jupiter trojan	Trans-Neptunian obj.
Unclassified

== 748001–748100 ==
Designation			Discovery			Properties		Ref
Permanent	Provisional	Named after	Date	Site	Discoverer(s)	Category	Diam.	Ref
748001	2013 CP_{209}	—	February 1, 2013	Haleakala	Pan-STARRS 1	·	1.6 km	MPC · JPL
748002	2013 CK_{211}	—	January 6, 2013	Kitt Peak	Spacewatch	·	620 m	MPC · JPL
748003	2013 CB_{216}	—	October 21, 2003	Kitt Peak	Spacewatch	·	960 m	MPC · JPL
748004	2013 CK_{216}	—	September 19, 2011	Haleakala	Pan-STARRS 1	EUN	840 m	MPC · JPL
748005	2013 CV_{216}	—	February 6, 2013	Kitt Peak	Spacewatch	·	1.1 km	MPC · JPL
748006	2013 CK_{218}	—	February 8, 2013	Haleakala	Pan-STARRS 1	WIT	750 m	MPC · JPL
748007	2013 CT_{224}	—	November 19, 2007	Kitt Peak	Spacewatch	·	1.3 km	MPC · JPL
748008	2013 CY_{225}	—	February 5, 2013	Kitt Peak	Spacewatch	HNS	980 m	MPC · JPL
748009	2013 CU_{226}	—	February 11, 2013	Nogales	M. Schwartz, P. R. Holvorcem	·	1.6 km	MPC · JPL
748010	2013 CR_{228}	—	February 14, 2013	Tenerife	ESA OGS	·	650 m	MPC · JPL
748011	2013 CM_{230}	—	February 3, 2013	Haleakala	Pan-STARRS 1	PHO	790 m	MPC · JPL
748012	2013 CA_{231}	—	February 14, 2013	Haleakala	Pan-STARRS 1	·	1.7 km	MPC · JPL
748013	2013 CQ_{233}	—	July 23, 2015	Haleakala	Pan-STARRS 1	·	1.5 km	MPC · JPL
748014	2013 CS_{233}	—	March 18, 2018	Haleakala	Pan-STARRS 1	·	1.5 km	MPC · JPL
748015	2013 CV_{233}	—	September 18, 2007	Anderson Mesa	LONEOS	·	790 m	MPC · JPL
748016	2013 CC_{234}	—	January 14, 2018	Haleakala	Pan-STARRS 1	·	1.6 km	MPC · JPL
748017	2013 CM_{234}	—	October 3, 2015	Haleakala	Pan-STARRS 1	HNS	960 m	MPC · JPL
748018	2013 CW_{235}	—	December 23, 2016	Haleakala	Pan-STARRS 1	·	1.3 km	MPC · JPL
748019	2013 CB_{236}	—	February 14, 2013	Mount Lemmon	Mount Lemmon Survey	WIT	820 m	MPC · JPL
748020	2013 CC_{242}	—	February 15, 2013	Haleakala	Pan-STARRS 1	EUN	810 m	MPC · JPL
748021	2013 CM_{242}	—	February 5, 2013	Mount Lemmon	Mount Lemmon Survey	·	3.0 km	MPC · JPL
748022	2013 CL_{246}	—	February 15, 2013	Haleakala	Pan-STARRS 1	MRX	830 m	MPC · JPL
748023	2013 CS_{246}	—	February 6, 2013	Kitt Peak	Spacewatch	·	1.6 km	MPC · JPL
748024	2013 CR_{248}	—	February 7, 2013	Catalina	CSS	·	1.7 km	MPC · JPL
748025	2013 CE_{251}	—	February 14, 2013	Haleakala	Pan-STARRS 1	·	1.4 km	MPC · JPL
748026	2013 CN_{254}	—	February 13, 2013	Haleakala	Pan-STARRS 1	·	2.5 km	MPC · JPL
748027	2013 CD_{256}	—	February 3, 2013	Haleakala	Pan-STARRS 1	L4	5.7 km	MPC · JPL
748028	2013 DE_{3}	—	February 16, 2013	Kitt Peak	Spacewatch	·	1.2 km	MPC · JPL
748029	2013 DT_{4}	—	February 9, 2013	Haleakala	Pan-STARRS 1	·	1.2 km	MPC · JPL
748030	2013 DZ_{4}	—	January 17, 2013	Mount Lemmon	Mount Lemmon Survey	·	1.5 km	MPC · JPL
748031	2013 DL_{7}	—	February 7, 2013	Kitt Peak	Spacewatch	·	1.2 km	MPC · JPL
748032	2013 DB_{10}	—	February 17, 2013	Mount Lemmon	Mount Lemmon Survey	·	3.1 km	MPC · JPL
748033	2013 DX_{11}	—	February 8, 2013	Haleakala	Pan-STARRS 1	HNS	870 m	MPC · JPL
748034	2013 DK_{14}	—	September 28, 2011	Mount Lemmon	Mount Lemmon Survey	·	1.1 km	MPC · JPL
748035	2013 DE_{17}	—	September 26, 2011	Mount Lemmon	Mount Lemmon Survey	·	940 m	MPC · JPL
748036	2013 DV_{17}	—	February 18, 2013	Kitt Peak	Spacewatch	·	1.3 km	MPC · JPL
748037	2013 DU_{21}	—	February 17, 2013	Mount Lemmon	Mount Lemmon Survey	·	1.4 km	MPC · JPL
748038	2013 DT_{22}	—	February 16, 2013	La Silla	A. Galád	·	1.8 km	MPC · JPL
748039	2013 EK	—	March 2, 2013	Haleakala	Pan-STARRS 1	H	450 m	MPC · JPL
748040	2013 ES_{5}	—	February 15, 2013	Haleakala	Pan-STARRS 1	·	1.4 km	MPC · JPL
748041	2013 EJ_{8}	—	March 3, 2013	Mount Lemmon	Mount Lemmon Survey	·	1.6 km	MPC · JPL
748042	2013 ED_{9}	—	May 16, 2005	Mount Lemmon	Mount Lemmon Survey	·	1.1 km	MPC · JPL
748043	2013 EM_{9}	—	July 10, 2011	San Pedro de Atacama	I. de la Cueva	·	1.6 km	MPC · JPL
748044	2013 EN_{17}	—	January 10, 2008	Catalina	CSS	·	1.7 km	MPC · JPL
748045	2013 EK_{18}	—	January 19, 2013	Kitt Peak	Spacewatch	·	1.3 km	MPC · JPL
748046	2013 EW_{18}	—	February 14, 2013	Haleakala	Pan-STARRS 1	·	1.6 km	MPC · JPL
748047	2013 ED_{22}	—	March 5, 2013	Mount Lemmon	Mount Lemmon Survey	MIS	2.0 km	MPC · JPL
748048	2013 ET_{23}	—	March 7, 2013	Haleakala	Pan-STARRS 1	H	380 m	MPC · JPL
748049	2013 EE_{28}	—	March 6, 2013	Haleakala	Pan-STARRS 1	H	500 m	MPC · JPL
748050	2013 EO_{29}	—	February 23, 2013	Catalina	CSS	·	1.8 km	MPC · JPL
748051	2013 EQ_{29}	—	March 4, 2013	Haleakala	Pan-STARRS 1	·	1.3 km	MPC · JPL
748052	2013 EE_{30}	—	February 5, 2013	Catalina	CSS	·	1.4 km	MPC · JPL
748053	2013 EJ_{30}	—	November 18, 2011	Mount Lemmon	Mount Lemmon Survey	·	1.2 km	MPC · JPL
748054	2013 EX_{30}	—	March 7, 2013	Kitt Peak	Spacewatch	HNS	1.1 km	MPC · JPL
748055	2013 EQ_{33}	—	January 9, 2013	Mount Lemmon	Mount Lemmon Survey	·	1.7 km	MPC · JPL
748056	2013 EW_{40}	—	March 11, 2013	Mount Lemmon	Mount Lemmon Survey	·	1.7 km	MPC · JPL
748057	2013 ET_{41}	—	March 6, 2013	Haleakala	Pan-STARRS 1	·	1.4 km	MPC · JPL
748058	2013 ED_{57}	—	September 2, 2010	Mount Lemmon	Mount Lemmon Survey	·	1.4 km	MPC · JPL
748059	2013 EC_{59}	—	March 8, 2013	Haleakala	Pan-STARRS 1	·	3.3 km	MPC · JPL
748060	2013 EF_{61}	—	September 19, 2006	Catalina	CSS	H	360 m	MPC · JPL
748061	2013 ER_{66}	—	March 11, 2013	Kitt Peak	Spacewatch	·	1.6 km	MPC · JPL
748062	2013 EJ_{67}	—	March 12, 2013	Kitt Peak	Spacewatch	·	1.5 km	MPC · JPL
748063	2013 EY_{67}	—	November 3, 2011	Mount Lemmon	Mount Lemmon Survey	·	1.7 km	MPC · JPL
748064	2013 EY_{76}	—	March 8, 2013	Haleakala	Pan-STARRS 1	·	1.5 km	MPC · JPL
748065	2013 EG_{80}	—	February 19, 2013	Kitt Peak	Spacewatch	·	1.5 km	MPC · JPL
748066	2013 EL_{83}	—	December 3, 2005	Mauna Kea	A. Boattini	·	1.1 km	MPC · JPL
748067	2013 EC_{84}	—	February 11, 2004	Palomar	NEAT	·	1.4 km	MPC · JPL
748068	2013 ET_{84}	—	August 24, 2011	Haleakala	Pan-STARRS 1	NYS	720 m	MPC · JPL
748069	2013 ED_{86}	—	September 26, 2011	Kitt Peak	Spacewatch	·	1.6 km	MPC · JPL
748070	2013 EY_{86}	—	February 19, 2013	Kitt Peak	Spacewatch	·	1.4 km	MPC · JPL
748071	2013 ET_{90}	—	March 11, 2000	Catalina	CSS	·	1.7 km	MPC · JPL
748072	2013 EY_{90}	—	March 3, 2013	Mount Lemmon	Mount Lemmon Survey	H	410 m	MPC · JPL
748073	2013 EE_{91}	—	February 14, 2013	Haleakala	Pan-STARRS 1	·	1.2 km	MPC · JPL
748074	2013 EH_{91}	—	January 19, 2013	Mount Lemmon	Mount Lemmon Survey	PHO	940 m	MPC · JPL
748075	2013 ET_{92}	—	March 14, 2004	Palomar	NEAT	·	1.7 km	MPC · JPL
748076	2013 EL_{99}	—	April 27, 2006	Cerro Tololo	Deep Ecliptic Survey	·	560 m	MPC · JPL
748077	2013 EZ_{100}	—	March 8, 2013	Haleakala	Pan-STARRS 1	HNS	900 m	MPC · JPL
748078	2013 ED_{101}	—	March 8, 2013	Haleakala	Pan-STARRS 1	·	1.8 km	MPC · JPL
748079	2013 EJ_{105}	—	October 23, 2003	Apache Point	SDSS	·	1.1 km	MPC · JPL
748080	2013 EA_{108}	—	March 13, 2013	Mount Lemmon	Mount Lemmon Survey	·	1.5 km	MPC · JPL
748081	2013 EU_{109}	—	March 6, 2013	Haleakala	Pan-STARRS 1	·	2.1 km	MPC · JPL
748082	2013 EO_{110}	—	March 12, 2013	Mount Lemmon	Mount Lemmon Survey	·	500 m	MPC · JPL
748083	2013 EY_{110}	—	March 13, 2013	Palomar	Palomar Transient Factory	(18466)	1.6 km	MPC · JPL
748084	2013 EJ_{117}	—	February 13, 2008	Mount Lemmon	Mount Lemmon Survey	H	400 m	MPC · JPL
748085	2013 EL_{118}	—	March 7, 2013	Mount Lemmon	Mount Lemmon Survey	H	440 m	MPC · JPL
748086	2013 EM_{119}	—	March 5, 2013	Mount Lemmon	Mount Lemmon Survey	H	390 m	MPC · JPL
748087	2013 EH_{120}	—	March 13, 2013	Catalina	CSS	·	1.4 km	MPC · JPL
748088	2013 ER_{123}	—	January 25, 2006	Kitt Peak	Spacewatch	·	570 m	MPC · JPL
748089	2013 EG_{124}	—	February 2, 2008	Mount Lemmon	Mount Lemmon Survey	KOR	1.2 km	MPC · JPL
748090	2013 EP_{126}	—	October 31, 2011	Mount Lemmon	Mount Lemmon Survey	·	1.7 km	MPC · JPL
748091	2013 EF_{137}	—	January 5, 2013	Kitt Peak	Spacewatch	L4	6.4 km	MPC · JPL
748092	2013 ET_{142}	—	February 8, 2013	Kitt Peak	Spacewatch	·	1.8 km	MPC · JPL
748093	2013 EB_{150}	—	March 13, 2013	Kitt Peak	M. W. Buie	·	2.8 km	MPC · JPL
748094	2013 ES_{152}	—	February 7, 2008	Kitt Peak	Spacewatch	AEO	950 m	MPC · JPL
748095	2013 EU_{154}	—	March 8, 2013	Haleakala	Pan-STARRS 1	H	400 m	MPC · JPL
748096	2013 EV_{154}	—	May 8, 2014	Haleakala	Pan-STARRS 1	3:2	3.8 km	MPC · JPL
748097	2013 EE_{155}	—	March 15, 2013	Kitt Peak	Spacewatch	·	1.4 km	MPC · JPL
748098	2013 EV_{156}	—	October 20, 2011	Mount Lemmon	Mount Lemmon Survey	·	1.2 km	MPC · JPL
748099	2013 ET_{158}	—	March 13, 2013	Haleakala	Pan-STARRS 1	·	600 m	MPC · JPL
748100	2013 EO_{159}	—	March 13, 2013	Haleakala	Pan-STARRS 1	H	430 m	MPC · JPL

== 748101–748200 ==
back to top

Designation			Discovery			Properties		Ref
Permanent	Provisional	Named after	Date	Site	Discoverer(s)	Category	Diam.	Ref
748101	2013 EX_{159}	—	March 5, 2013	Mount Lemmon	Mount Lemmon Survey	3:2	4.7 km	MPC · JPL
748102	2013 EE_{163}	—	March 5, 2013	Mount Lemmon	Mount Lemmon Survey	HNS	1.0 km	MPC · JPL
748103	2013 EV_{163}	—	May 25, 2014	Haleakala	Pan-STARRS 1	·	1.2 km	MPC · JPL
748104	2013 EC_{164}	—	March 5, 2013	Haleakala	Pan-STARRS 1	MRX	930 m	MPC · JPL
748105	2013 EK_{167}	—	March 8, 2013	Haleakala	Pan-STARRS 1	·	840 m	MPC · JPL
748106	2013 EK_{168}	—	March 13, 2013	Mount Lemmon	Mount Lemmon Survey	GEF	970 m	MPC · JPL
748107	2013 EE_{170}	—	March 8, 2013	Haleakala	Pan-STARRS 1	·	570 m	MPC · JPL
748108	2013 EF_{173}	—	March 5, 2013	Mount Lemmon	Mount Lemmon Survey	·	1.0 km	MPC · JPL
748109	2013 EC_{174}	—	August 24, 2011	Haleakala	Pan-STARRS 1	H	440 m	MPC · JPL
748110	2013 FP	—	January 19, 2013	Mount Lemmon	Mount Lemmon Survey	H	380 m	MPC · JPL
748111	2013 FV_{3}	—	March 17, 2013	Palomar	Palomar Transient Factory	JUN	900 m	MPC · JPL
748112	2013 FZ_{4}	—	March 4, 2013	Haleakala	Pan-STARRS 1	H	440 m	MPC · JPL
748113	2013 FQ_{7}	—	March 13, 2013	Palomar	Palomar Transient Factory	·	1.7 km	MPC · JPL
748114	2013 FQ_{8}	—	March 5, 2013	Haleakala	Pan-STARRS 1	EUN	1.1 km	MPC · JPL
748115	2013 FY_{8}	—	January 19, 2013	Mount Lemmon	Mount Lemmon Survey	·	1.6 km	MPC · JPL
748116	2013 FO_{10}	—	March 13, 2004	Palomar	NEAT	JUN	800 m	MPC · JPL
748117	2013 FT_{14}	—	March 24, 2013	Palomar	Palomar Transient Factory	·	1.4 km	MPC · JPL
748118	2013 FN_{16}	—	February 17, 2013	Mount Lemmon	Mount Lemmon Survey	·	1.3 km	MPC · JPL
748119	2013 FB_{18}	—	March 14, 2013	Kitt Peak	Spacewatch	H	500 m	MPC · JPL
748120	2013 FS_{25}	—	April 4, 2013	Catalina	CSS	·	1.6 km	MPC · JPL
748121	2013 FE_{27}	—	April 19, 2006	Mount Lemmon	Mount Lemmon Survey	·	800 m	MPC · JPL
748122	2013 FN_{28}	—	March 16, 2013	Cerro Tololo	S. S. Sheppard, C. A. Trujillo	centaur	116 km	MPC · JPL
748123	2013 FA_{29}	—	March 14, 2013	Catalina	CSS	·	1.7 km	MPC · JPL
748124	2013 GB	—	March 13, 2013	Palomar	Palomar Transient Factory	H	610 m	MPC · JPL
748125	2013 GA_{3}	—	February 4, 2006	Catalina	CSS	PHO	950 m	MPC · JPL
748126	2013 GJ_{3}	—	April 2, 2013	Haleakala	Pan-STARRS 1	H	430 m	MPC · JPL
748127	2013 GD_{7}	—	February 14, 2013	Kitt Peak	Spacewatch	·	1.4 km	MPC · JPL
748128	2013 GW_{11}	—	April 2, 2013	Mount Lemmon	Mount Lemmon Survey	·	1.4 km	MPC · JPL
748129	2013 GT_{13}	—	March 18, 2013	Nogales	M. Schwartz, P. R. Holvorcem	·	1.9 km	MPC · JPL
748130	2013 GK_{14}	—	August 3, 2011	Haleakala	Pan-STARRS 1	H	550 m	MPC · JPL
748131	2013 GR_{16}	—	September 17, 2010	Mount Lemmon	Mount Lemmon Survey	·	1.6 km	MPC · JPL
748132	2013 GD_{18}	—	February 15, 2013	Haleakala	Pan-STARRS 1	·	600 m	MPC · JPL
748133	2013 GM_{19}	—	December 5, 2007	Kitt Peak	Spacewatch	·	1.4 km	MPC · JPL
748134	2013 GG_{20}	—	December 28, 2005	Kitt Peak	Spacewatch	·	480 m	MPC · JPL
748135	2013 GB_{24}	—	March 5, 2013	Haleakala	Pan-STARRS 1	·	570 m	MPC · JPL
748136	2013 GD_{32}	—	March 27, 2003	Palomar	NEAT	·	630 m	MPC · JPL
748137	2013 GD_{35}	—	March 14, 2013	Kitt Peak	Spacewatch	H	530 m	MPC · JPL
748138	2013 GH_{40}	—	October 28, 2008	Mount Lemmon	Mount Lemmon Survey	·	480 m	MPC · JPL
748139	2013 GW_{43}	—	March 18, 2013	Kitt Peak	Spacewatch	·	530 m	MPC · JPL
748140	2013 GR_{44}	—	April 8, 2013	Mount Lemmon	Mount Lemmon Survey	·	1.0 km	MPC · JPL
748141	2013 GH_{45}	—	November 28, 2011	Kitt Peak	Spacewatch	·	1.0 km	MPC · JPL
748142	2013 GG_{55}	—	March 11, 2013	Catalina	CSS	PHO	1.0 km	MPC · JPL
748143	2013 GJ_{55}	—	May 9, 2004	Haleakala	NEAT	·	1.9 km	MPC · JPL
748144	2013 GQ_{63}	—	February 11, 2008	Mount Lemmon	Mount Lemmon Survey	·	1.4 km	MPC · JPL
748145	2013 GT_{63}	—	April 9, 2013	Haleakala	Pan-STARRS 1	·	1.2 km	MPC · JPL
748146	2013 GC_{67}	—	March 15, 2013	Mount Lemmon	Mount Lemmon Survey	·	500 m	MPC · JPL
748147	2013 GG_{69}	—	April 10, 2013	Haleakala	Pan-STARRS 1	T_{j} (2.99) · APO · PHA	600 m	MPC · JPL
748148	2013 GB_{74}	—	March 4, 2013	Haleakala	Pan-STARRS 1	H	450 m	MPC · JPL
748149	2013 GG_{74}	—	March 5, 2013	Haleakala	Pan-STARRS 1	·	1.6 km	MPC · JPL
748150	2013 GV_{84}	—	April 11, 2013	Nogales	M. Schwartz, P. R. Holvorcem	·	1.5 km	MPC · JPL
748151	2013 GH_{88}	—	March 31, 2013	Mount Lemmon	Mount Lemmon Survey	·	1.7 km	MPC · JPL
748152	2013 GO_{88}	—	March 11, 2013	Mount Lemmon	Mount Lemmon Survey	·	610 m	MPC · JPL
748153	2013 GQ_{90}	—	March 5, 2013	Kitt Peak	Spacewatch	·	780 m	MPC · JPL
748154	2013 GD_{95}	—	March 16, 2013	Kitt Peak	Spacewatch	EUN	1.0 km	MPC · JPL
748155	2013 GH_{96}	—	April 2, 2013	Mount Lemmon	Mount Lemmon Survey	H	400 m	MPC · JPL
748156	2013 GE_{97}	—	April 7, 2003	Kitt Peak	Spacewatch	·	510 m	MPC · JPL
748157	2013 GY_{101}	—	October 5, 2005	Catalina	CSS	·	3.0 km	MPC · JPL
748158	2013 GB_{106}	—	September 17, 2010	Mount Lemmon	Mount Lemmon Survey	·	940 m	MPC · JPL
748159	2013 GS_{125}	—	April 11, 2013	Kitt Peak	Spacewatch	·	530 m	MPC · JPL
748160	2013 GJ_{128}	—	April 8, 2013	Palomar	Palomar Transient Factory	·	690 m	MPC · JPL
748161	2013 GH_{129}	—	March 6, 2013	Haleakala	Pan-STARRS 1	PHO	700 m	MPC · JPL
748162	2013 GG_{135}	—	April 13, 2013	Haleakala	Pan-STARRS 1	·	1.6 km	MPC · JPL
748163	2013 GS_{135}	—	March 6, 2008	Mount Lemmon	Mount Lemmon Survey	·	1.5 km	MPC · JPL
748164	2013 GT_{139}	—	April 13, 2013	Haleakala	Pan-STARRS 1	·	2.6 km	MPC · JPL
748165	2013 GM_{140}	—	April 11, 2013	Mount Lemmon	Mount Lemmon Survey	·	1.7 km	MPC · JPL
748166	2013 GE_{141}	—	April 15, 2013	Haleakala	Pan-STARRS 1	TIN	970 m	MPC · JPL
748167	2013 GT_{141}	—	April 12, 2013	Haleakala	Pan-STARRS 1	·	550 m	MPC · JPL
748168	2013 GY_{141}	—	April 14, 2013	Mount Lemmon	Mount Lemmon Survey	·	690 m	MPC · JPL
748169	2013 GG_{142}	—	May 10, 2014	Haleakala	Pan-STARRS 1	·	1.7 km	MPC · JPL
748170	2013 GW_{143}	—	April 12, 2013	Haleakala	Pan-STARRS 1	EUN	830 m	MPC · JPL
748171	2013 GF_{147}	—	April 10, 2013	Haleakala	Pan-STARRS 1	BRA	1.3 km	MPC · JPL
748172	2013 GQ_{150}	—	April 14, 2013	Mount Lemmon	Mount Lemmon Survey	·	520 m	MPC · JPL
748173	2013 GC_{152}	—	April 15, 2013	Haleakala	Pan-STARRS 1	·	1.3 km	MPC · JPL
748174	2013 GF_{152}	—	April 14, 2013	Mount Lemmon	Mount Lemmon Survey	(2076)	630 m	MPC · JPL
748175	2013 GJ_{152}	—	April 12, 2013	Haleakala	Pan-STARRS 1	·	550 m	MPC · JPL
748176	2013 GH_{153}	—	April 10, 2013	Haleakala	Pan-STARRS 1	·	510 m	MPC · JPL
748177	2013 GH_{158}	—	April 8, 2013	Mount Lemmon	Mount Lemmon Survey	·	850 m	MPC · JPL
748178	2013 HU_{4}	—	October 18, 2001	Palomar	NEAT	PHO	960 m	MPC · JPL
748179	2013 HA_{6}	—	April 18, 2013	Mount Lemmon	Mount Lemmon Survey	·	930 m	MPC · JPL
748180	2013 HV_{7}	—	March 31, 2013	Mount Lemmon	Mount Lemmon Survey	H	440 m	MPC · JPL
748181	2013 HH_{17}	—	April 14, 2002	Palomar	NEAT	·	2.4 km	MPC · JPL
748182	2013 HY_{25}	—	April 10, 2013	Palomar	Palomar Transient Factory	·	1.1 km	MPC · JPL
748183	2013 HM_{26}	—	April 13, 2013	Haleakala	Pan-STARRS 1	·	1.4 km	MPC · JPL
748184	2013 HJ_{30}	—	April 16, 2013	Cerro Tololo	DECam	·	630 m	MPC · JPL
748185	2013 HG_{34}	—	April 9, 2013	Haleakala	Pan-STARRS 1	·	1.0 km	MPC · JPL
748186	2013 HZ_{35}	—	December 27, 2011	Mount Lemmon	Mount Lemmon Survey	·	1.2 km	MPC · JPL
748187	2013 HT_{36}	—	April 16, 2013	Cerro Tololo	DECam	EUN	1.1 km	MPC · JPL
748188	2013 HU_{38}	—	April 9, 2013	Haleakala	Pan-STARRS 1	·	1.4 km	MPC · JPL
748189	2013 HY_{49}	—	April 9, 2013	Haleakala	Pan-STARRS 1	EUN	900 m	MPC · JPL
748190	2013 HJ_{55}	—	December 2, 2010	Mount Lemmon	Mount Lemmon Survey	·	1.3 km	MPC · JPL
748191	2013 HW_{58}	—	April 4, 2013	Siding Spring	SSS	·	2.3 km	MPC · JPL
748192	2013 HQ_{59}	—	February 10, 2008	Kitt Peak	Spacewatch	·	1.3 km	MPC · JPL
748193	2013 HX_{59}	—	April 20, 2009	Mount Lemmon	Mount Lemmon Survey	·	780 m	MPC · JPL
748194	2013 HQ_{62}	—	April 9, 2013	Haleakala	Pan-STARRS 1	(2076)	560 m	MPC · JPL
748195	2013 HD_{71}	—	April 9, 2013	Haleakala	Pan-STARRS 1	·	1.2 km	MPC · JPL
748196	2013 HP_{71}	—	April 9, 2013	Haleakala	Pan-STARRS 1	·	530 m	MPC · JPL
748197	2013 HB_{72}	—	March 13, 2008	Mount Lemmon	Mount Lemmon Survey	AGN	850 m	MPC · JPL
748198	2013 HS_{72}	—	October 2, 2010	Kitt Peak	Spacewatch	·	1.1 km	MPC · JPL
748199	2013 HR_{76}	—	April 15, 2013	Calar Alto	F. Hormuth	·	640 m	MPC · JPL
748200	2013 HH_{81}	—	May 12, 2013	Mount Lemmon	Mount Lemmon Survey	·	1.4 km	MPC · JPL

== 748201–748300 ==
back to top

Designation			Discovery			Properties		Ref
Permanent	Provisional	Named after	Date	Site	Discoverer(s)	Category	Diam.	Ref
748201	2013 HJ_{84}	—	October 17, 2010	Mount Lemmon	Mount Lemmon Survey	EOS	1.4 km	MPC · JPL
748202	2013 HX_{93}	—	April 9, 2013	Haleakala	Pan-STARRS 1	·	540 m	MPC · JPL
748203	2013 HE_{102}	—	April 3, 2013	Mount Lemmon	Mount Lemmon Survey	·	1.3 km	MPC · JPL
748204	2013 HD_{122}	—	April 10, 2013	Haleakala	Pan-STARRS 1	·	460 m	MPC · JPL
748205	2013 HL_{125}	—	April 17, 2013	Cerro Tololo	DECam	·	1.4 km	MPC · JPL
748206	2013 HG_{128}	—	April 17, 2013	Cerro Tololo	DECam	(16286)	1.1 km	MPC · JPL
748207	2013 HS_{128}	—	September 11, 2005	Kitt Peak	Spacewatch	·	1.1 km	MPC · JPL
748208	2013 HQ_{145}	—	April 16, 2013	Cerro Tololo	DECam	·	1.3 km	MPC · JPL
748209	2013 HF_{157}	—	April 17, 2013	Haleakala	Pan-STARRS 1	·	1.6 km	MPC · JPL
748210	2013 HO_{157}	—	April 16, 2013	Haleakala	Pan-STARRS 1	·	1.6 km	MPC · JPL
748211	2013 HG_{158}	—	April 21, 2013	Haleakala	Pan-STARRS 1	THB	3.0 km	MPC · JPL
748212	2013 HT_{158}	—	April 18, 2013	Kitt Peak	Spacewatch	·	1.5 km	MPC · JPL
748213	2013 HU_{158}	—	April 20, 2013	Mount Lemmon	Mount Lemmon Survey	TIN	1.1 km	MPC · JPL
748214	2013 JW_{6}	—	October 18, 2011	Piszkés-tető	K. Sárneczky, A. Szing	H	450 m	MPC · JPL
748215	2013 JV_{12}	—	May 8, 2013	Haleakala	Pan-STARRS 1	BRA	1.1 km	MPC · JPL
748216	2013 JJ_{20}	—	January 16, 2009	Kitt Peak	Spacewatch	·	650 m	MPC · JPL
748217	2013 JF_{26}	—	April 19, 2013	Haleakala	Pan-STARRS 1	EUN	1.1 km	MPC · JPL
748218	2013 JU_{27}	—	April 30, 2013	Kitt Peak	Spacewatch	·	1.6 km	MPC · JPL
748219	2013 JP_{30}	—	January 1, 2009	Mount Lemmon	Mount Lemmon Survey	NYS	690 m	MPC · JPL
748220	2013 JF_{31}	—	March 14, 2013	Palomar	Palomar Transient Factory	·	1.7 km	MPC · JPL
748221	2013 JN_{31}	—	March 4, 2013	Haleakala	Pan-STARRS 1	JUN	810 m	MPC · JPL
748222	2013 JL_{33}	—	April 15, 2013	Haleakala	Pan-STARRS 1	·	1.6 km	MPC · JPL
748223	2013 JP_{35}	—	March 5, 2013	Haleakala	Pan-STARRS 1	·	1.5 km	MPC · JPL
748224	2013 JC_{45}	—	October 18, 2007	Kitt Peak	Spacewatch	·	580 m	MPC · JPL
748225	2013 JL_{45}	—	May 12, 2013	Kitt Peak	Spacewatch	·	810 m	MPC · JPL
748226	2013 JU_{45}	—	April 16, 2013	Haleakala	Pan-STARRS 1	H	370 m	MPC · JPL
748227	2013 JQ_{46}	—	May 12, 2013	Mount Lemmon	Mount Lemmon Survey	·	510 m	MPC · JPL
748228	2013 JC_{49}	—	November 9, 2004	Mauna Kea	Veillet, C.	·	580 m	MPC · JPL
748229	2013 JW_{56}	—	April 15, 2013	Haleakala	Pan-STARRS 1	·	1.4 km	MPC · JPL
748230	2013 JA_{63}	—	April 7, 2013	Mount Lemmon	Mount Lemmon Survey	·	2.7 km	MPC · JPL
748231	2013 JP_{67}	—	May 8, 2013	Haleakala	Pan-STARRS 1	·	1.5 km	MPC · JPL
748232	2013 JA_{68}	—	August 20, 2014	Haleakala	Pan-STARRS 1	·	1.4 km	MPC · JPL
748233	2013 JT_{68}	—	November 3, 2015	Mount Lemmon	Mount Lemmon Survey	·	1.5 km	MPC · JPL
748234	2013 JV_{68}	—	May 15, 2013	Haleakala	Pan-STARRS 1	·	600 m	MPC · JPL
748235	2013 JZ_{70}	—	May 9, 2013	Haleakala	Pan-STARRS 1	·	1.5 km	MPC · JPL
748236	2013 JW_{71}	—	July 25, 2014	Haleakala	Pan-STARRS 1	·	1.7 km	MPC · JPL
748237	2013 JC_{75}	—	May 2, 2013	Kitt Peak	Spacewatch	·	650 m	MPC · JPL
748238	2013 JE_{77}	—	May 12, 2013	Mount Lemmon	Mount Lemmon Survey	·	1.9 km	MPC · JPL
748239	2013 KC_{1}	—	May 16, 2013	Haleakala	Pan-STARRS 1	·	1.3 km	MPC · JPL
748240	2013 KU_{6}	—	May 31, 2013	Haleakala	Pan-STARRS 1	H	480 m	MPC · JPL
748241	2013 KE_{7}	—	April 15, 2013	Haleakala	Pan-STARRS 1	·	1.5 km	MPC · JPL
748242	2013 KU_{7}	—	October 31, 2005	Mount Lemmon	Mount Lemmon Survey	DOR	2.0 km	MPC · JPL
748243	2013 KK_{13}	—	May 16, 2013	Haleakala	Pan-STARRS 1	NYS	920 m	MPC · JPL
748244	2013 KQ_{15}	—	May 16, 2013	Mount Lemmon	Mount Lemmon Survey	·	530 m	MPC · JPL
748245	2013 KB_{16}	—	May 16, 2013	Nogales	M. Schwartz, P. R. Holvorcem	·	760 m	MPC · JPL
748246	2013 LV_{6}	—	November 14, 2006	Catalina	CSS	H	390 m	MPC · JPL
748247	2013 LK_{9}	—	May 30, 2013	Mount Lemmon	Mount Lemmon Survey	·	610 m	MPC · JPL
748248	2013 LY_{12}	—	May 5, 2008	Mount Lemmon	Mount Lemmon Survey	·	1.6 km	MPC · JPL
748249	2013 LJ_{14}	—	May 16, 2013	Haleakala	Pan-STARRS 1	·	540 m	MPC · JPL
748250	2013 LM_{14}	—	June 5, 2013	Kitt Peak	Spacewatch	·	1.3 km	MPC · JPL
748251	2013 LE_{19}	—	May 11, 2013	Mount Lemmon	Mount Lemmon Survey	·	750 m	MPC · JPL
748252	2013 LM_{25}	—	April 26, 2003	Kitt Peak	Spacewatch	·	450 m	MPC · JPL
748253	2013 LV_{26}	—	June 1, 2013	Kitt Peak	Spacewatch	H	490 m	MPC · JPL
748254	2013 LD_{27}	—	June 4, 2013	Kitt Peak	Spacewatch	·	1.6 km	MPC · JPL
748255	2013 LL_{28}	—	April 21, 2013	Mount Lemmon	Mount Lemmon Survey	·	630 m	MPC · JPL
748256	2013 LT_{29}	—	June 9, 2013	Kitt Peak	Spacewatch	·	1.8 km	MPC · JPL
748257	2013 LV_{30}	—	June 14, 2013	Mount Lemmon	Mount Lemmon Survey	·	1.6 km	MPC · JPL
748258	2013 LL_{31}	—	June 15, 2013	Kitt Peak	Spacewatch	AMO	300 m	MPC · JPL
748259	2013 LV_{36}	—	December 4, 2007	Mount Lemmon	Mount Lemmon Survey	·	1.0 km	MPC · JPL
748260	2013 LX_{36}	—	June 12, 2013	Haleakala	Pan-STARRS 1	·	560 m	MPC · JPL
748261	2013 LH_{37}	—	June 12, 2013	Haleakala	Pan-STARRS 1	TIR	2.5 km	MPC · JPL
748262	2013 LY_{38}	—	June 7, 2013	Haleakala	Pan-STARRS 1	·	1.4 km	MPC · JPL
748263	2013 LZ_{38}	—	June 7, 2013	Haleakala	Pan-STARRS 1	·	1.3 km	MPC · JPL
748264	2013 LE_{39}	—	April 9, 2018	Mount Lemmon	Mount Lemmon Survey	H	430 m	MPC · JPL
748265	2013 LG_{42}	—	June 4, 2013	Haleakala	Pan-STARRS 1	·	600 m	MPC · JPL
748266	2013 LA_{43}	—	June 14, 2013	Mount Lemmon	Mount Lemmon Survey	·	1.5 km	MPC · JPL
748267	2013 MU_{1}	—	May 3, 2013	Mount Lemmon	Mount Lemmon Survey	·	600 m	MPC · JPL
748268	2013 MV_{1}	—	May 12, 2013	Mount Lemmon	Mount Lemmon Survey	·	1.5 km	MPC · JPL
748269	2013 MU_{2}	—	June 17, 2013	Elena Remote	Oreshko, A.	·	610 m	MPC · JPL
748270	2013 MQ_{4}	—	June 2, 2013	Catalina	CSS	·	850 m	MPC · JPL
748271	2013 MU_{5}	—	June 19, 2013	Haleakala	Pan-STARRS 1	·	1.7 km	MPC · JPL
748272	2013 MF_{8}	—	May 15, 2013	Haleakala	Pan-STARRS 1	·	590 m	MPC · JPL
748273	2013 MG_{10}	—	September 22, 2006	Kitt Peak	Spacewatch	·	640 m	MPC · JPL
748274	2013 MS_{12}	—	March 15, 2012	Mount Lemmon	Mount Lemmon Survey	·	1.8 km	MPC · JPL
748275	2013 MT_{12}	—	February 11, 2011	Mount Lemmon	Mount Lemmon Survey	·	2.6 km	MPC · JPL
748276	2013 MG_{14}	—	November 17, 2014	Haleakala	Pan-STARRS 1	·	570 m	MPC · JPL
748277	2013 ML_{14}	—	June 20, 2013	Haleakala	Pan-STARRS 1	·	2.3 km	MPC · JPL
748278	2013 MV_{15}	—	September 23, 2014	Haleakala	Pan-STARRS 1	·	1.7 km	MPC · JPL
748279	2013 MY_{15}	—	June 17, 2013	Haleakala	Pan-STARRS 1	·	1.7 km	MPC · JPL
748280	2013 MK_{20}	—	June 30, 2013	Haleakala	Pan-STARRS 1	·	1.6 km	MPC · JPL
748281	2013 NN_{4}	—	October 24, 2003	Apache Point	SDSS	V	570 m	MPC · JPL
748282	2013 NG_{5}	—	July 1, 2013	Haleakala	Pan-STARRS 1	·	570 m	MPC · JPL
748283	2013 NV_{6}	—	July 1, 2013	Haleakala	Pan-STARRS 1	APO +1km	990 m	MPC · JPL
748284	2013 NX_{7}	—	May 6, 2006	Kitt Peak	Spacewatch	·	560 m	MPC · JPL
748285	2013 NW_{8}	—	September 3, 2008	Kitt Peak	Spacewatch	·	1.9 km	MPC · JPL
748286	2013 NZ_{10}	—	June 18, 2013	Haleakala	Pan-STARRS 1	·	770 m	MPC · JPL
748287	2013 NK_{15}	—	July 12, 2013	ASC-Kislovodsk	Nevski, V.	H	620 m	MPC · JPL
748288	2013 NZ_{16}	—	July 13, 2013	Mount Lemmon	Mount Lemmon Survey	EOS	1.4 km	MPC · JPL
748289	2013 NC_{17}	—	July 13, 2013	Mount Lemmon	Mount Lemmon Survey	·	660 m	MPC · JPL
748290	2013 NN_{18}	—	July 14, 2013	Haleakala	Pan-STARRS 1	H	380 m	MPC · JPL
748291	2013 NR_{22}	—	July 5, 2013	Oukaïmeden	M. Ory	·	1.5 km	MPC · JPL
748292	2013 NN_{23}	—	November 9, 2009	Mount Lemmon	Mount Lemmon Survey	·	2.5 km	MPC · JPL
748293	2013 NH_{29}	—	July 13, 2013	Haleakala	Pan-STARRS 1	·	2.4 km	MPC · JPL
748294	2013 ND_{33}	—	July 4, 2013	Haleakala	Pan-STARRS 1	MAS	520 m	MPC · JPL
748295	2013 NV_{33}	—	July 13, 2013	Haleakala	Pan-STARRS 1	·	590 m	MPC · JPL
748296	2013 NX_{33}	—	July 14, 2013	Haleakala	Pan-STARRS 1	·	590 m	MPC · JPL
748297	2013 NZ_{38}	—	July 13, 2013	Haleakala	Pan-STARRS 1	·	2.0 km	MPC · JPL
748298	2013 NU_{41}	—	July 6, 2013	Haleakala	Pan-STARRS 1	BRA	1.2 km	MPC · JPL
748299	2013 NP_{42}	—	July 4, 2013	Haleakala	Pan-STARRS 1	NYS	750 m	MPC · JPL
748300	2013 NK_{46}	—	February 5, 2016	Haleakala	Pan-STARRS 1	·	1.4 km	MPC · JPL

== 748301–748400 ==
back to top

Designation			Discovery			Properties		Ref
Permanent	Provisional	Named after	Date	Site	Discoverer(s)	Category	Diam.	Ref
748301	2013 NR_{50}	—	July 2, 2013	Haleakala	Pan-STARRS 1	·	670 m	MPC · JPL
748302	2013 NU_{52}	—	May 6, 2006	Kitt Peak	Spacewatch	·	500 m	MPC · JPL
748303	2013 NB_{54}	—	July 1, 2013	Haleakala	Pan-STARRS 1	V	460 m	MPC · JPL
748304	2013 OX	—	July 16, 2013	Haleakala	Pan-STARRS 1	·	1.7 km	MPC · JPL
748305	2013 ON_{4}	—	October 2, 2008	Catalina	CSS	·	2.0 km	MPC · JPL
748306	2013 OC_{5}	—	September 20, 2003	Kitt Peak	Spacewatch	·	1.6 km	MPC · JPL
748307	2013 OQ_{6}	—	July 18, 2013	Haleakala	Pan-STARRS 1	EOS	1.6 km	MPC · JPL
748308	2013 OE_{10}	—	July 1, 2013	Haleakala	Pan-STARRS 1	T_{j} (2.97)	3.5 km	MPC · JPL
748309	2013 OO_{11}	—	August 4, 2013	Palomar	Palomar Transient Factory	·	2.6 km	MPC · JPL
748310	2013 OD_{13}	—	July 30, 2013	Kitt Peak	Spacewatch	·	1.2 km	MPC · JPL
748311	2013 OW_{14}	—	September 6, 2014	Mount Lemmon	Mount Lemmon Survey	BRA	1.3 km	MPC · JPL
748312	2013 PQ_{1}	—	July 28, 2013	Haleakala	Pan-STARRS 1	GEF	1.1 km	MPC · JPL
748313	2013 PQ_{2}	—	June 18, 2013	Mount Lemmon	Mount Lemmon Survey	H	550 m	MPC · JPL
748314	2013 PR_{2}	—	January 24, 2007	Catalina	CSS	H	490 m	MPC · JPL
748315	2013 PA_{3}	—	July 17, 2013	Haleakala	Pan-STARRS 1	H	520 m	MPC · JPL
748316	2013 PO_{3}	—	September 28, 2008	Mount Lemmon	Mount Lemmon Survey	·	1.5 km	MPC · JPL
748317	2013 PR_{5}	—	August 2, 2013	Haleakala	Pan-STARRS 1	BRA	1.5 km	MPC · JPL
748318	2013 PV_{6}	—	August 2, 2013	Palomar	Palomar Transient Factory	AMO	500 m	MPC · JPL
748319	2013 PB_{9}	—	October 16, 2009	Mount Lemmon	Mount Lemmon Survey	·	1.2 km	MPC · JPL
748320	2013 PO_{11}	—	June 20, 2013	Haleakala	Pan-STARRS 1	·	2.3 km	MPC · JPL
748321	2013 PH_{18}	—	September 4, 2008	Kitt Peak	Spacewatch	·	1.9 km	MPC · JPL
748322	2013 PK_{19}	—	May 16, 2012	Haleakala	Pan-STARRS 1	·	2.5 km	MPC · JPL
748323	2013 PX_{22}	—	September 23, 2008	Mount Lemmon	Mount Lemmon Survey	TIR	2.0 km	MPC · JPL
748324	2013 PS_{24}	—	February 10, 2011	Mount Lemmon	Mount Lemmon Survey	·	2.2 km	MPC · JPL
748325	2013 PW_{24}	—	August 6, 2013	Tenerife	ESA OGS	·	1.5 km	MPC · JPL
748326	2013 PN_{26}	—	August 6, 2013	Palomar	Palomar Transient Factory	·	760 m	MPC · JPL
748327	2013 PF_{27}	—	August 8, 2013	Kitt Peak	Spacewatch	·	2.4 km	MPC · JPL
748328	2013 PV_{31}	—	October 7, 2004	Socorro	LINEAR	·	1.5 km	MPC · JPL
748329	2013 PS_{32}	—	November 17, 2009	Kitt Peak	Spacewatch	·	1.1 km	MPC · JPL
748330	2013 PB_{41}	—	August 9, 2013	Haleakala	Pan-STARRS 1	V	420 m	MPC · JPL
748331	2013 PL_{42}	—	August 13, 2013	Kitt Peak	Spacewatch	T_{j} (2.99) · 3:2	4.2 km	MPC · JPL
748332	2013 PS_{44}	—	October 2, 2008	Mount Lemmon	Mount Lemmon Survey	·	2.1 km	MPC · JPL
748333	2013 PL_{46}	—	July 15, 2013	Haleakala	Pan-STARRS 1	EOS	1.7 km	MPC · JPL
748334	2013 PO_{49}	—	October 27, 2006	Mount Lemmon	Mount Lemmon Survey	MAS	530 m	MPC · JPL
748335	2013 PR_{51}	—	February 13, 2008	Mount Lemmon	Mount Lemmon Survey	·	610 m	MPC · JPL
748336	2013 PZ_{52}	—	August 14, 2013	Haleakala	Pan-STARRS 1	·	700 m	MPC · JPL
748337	2013 PA_{53}	—	August 12, 2013	Haleakala	Pan-STARRS 1	·	850 m	MPC · JPL
748338	2013 PY_{57}	—	August 15, 2013	Haleakala	Pan-STARRS 1	·	2.1 km	MPC · JPL
748339	2013 PB_{61}	—	January 24, 2012	Haleakala	Pan-STARRS 1	·	610 m	MPC · JPL
748340	2013 PK_{62}	—	July 15, 2013	Haleakala	Pan-STARRS 1	·	1.0 km	MPC · JPL
748341	2013 PE_{63}	—	February 13, 2012	Haleakala	Pan-STARRS 1	JUN	980 m	MPC · JPL
748342	2013 PZ_{65}	—	August 12, 2013	Kitt Peak	Spacewatch	·	2.8 km	MPC · JPL
748343	2013 PM_{66}	—	August 15, 2013	Haleakala	Pan-STARRS 1	·	2.8 km	MPC · JPL
748344	2013 PN_{67}	—	August 8, 2013	Ishigakijima	Ishigakijima	·	2.0 km	MPC · JPL
748345	2013 PJ_{69}	—	October 27, 2005	Kitt Peak	Spacewatch	·	850 m	MPC · JPL
748346	2013 PL_{72}	—	September 23, 2008	Catalina	CSS	·	2.0 km	MPC · JPL
748347	2013 PB_{76}	—	March 4, 2005	Mount Lemmon	Mount Lemmon Survey	EOS	1.4 km	MPC · JPL
748348	2013 PT_{77}	—	September 24, 2008	Mount Lemmon	Mount Lemmon Survey	EOS	1.3 km	MPC · JPL
748349	2013 PV_{80}	—	January 30, 2011	Haleakala	Pan-STARRS 1	·	770 m	MPC · JPL
748350	2013 PO_{81}	—	August 14, 2013	Haleakala	Pan-STARRS 1	·	600 m	MPC · JPL
748351	2013 PP_{81}	—	August 14, 2013	Haleakala	Pan-STARRS 1	·	2.1 km	MPC · JPL
748352	2013 PQ_{82}	—	May 15, 2007	Mount Lemmon	Mount Lemmon Survey	·	1.8 km	MPC · JPL
748353	2013 PG_{84}	—	August 15, 2013	Haleakala	Pan-STARRS 1	·	1.1 km	MPC · JPL
748354	2013 PU_{84}	—	August 12, 2013	Haleakala	Pan-STARRS 1	·	1.0 km	MPC · JPL
748355	2013 PL_{89}	—	August 15, 2013	Haleakala	Pan-STARRS 1	LIX	3.2 km	MPC · JPL
748356	2013 PU_{90}	—	August 10, 2013	Kitt Peak	Spacewatch	·	2.2 km	MPC · JPL
748357	2013 PJ_{91}	—	September 3, 2008	Kitt Peak	Spacewatch	·	1.9 km	MPC · JPL
748358	2013 PS_{91}	—	August 3, 2013	Haleakala	Pan-STARRS 1	·	2.3 km	MPC · JPL
748359	2013 PQ_{92}	—	September 23, 2008	Kitt Peak	Spacewatch	·	1.6 km	MPC · JPL
748360	2013 PB_{101}	—	August 14, 2013	Haleakala	Pan-STARRS 1	·	1.3 km	MPC · JPL
748361	2013 PG_{101}	—	August 3, 2013	Haleakala	Pan-STARRS 1	·	1.9 km	MPC · JPL
748362	2013 PD_{106}	—	August 15, 2013	Haleakala	Pan-STARRS 1	·	760 m	MPC · JPL
748363	2013 PP_{106}	—	August 15, 2013	Haleakala	Pan-STARRS 1	·	2.5 km	MPC · JPL
748364	2013 PW_{113}	—	August 12, 2013	Haleakala	Pan-STARRS 1	·	1.9 km	MPC · JPL
748365	2013 QY_{2}	—	August 9, 2013	Catalina	CSS	·	2.1 km	MPC · JPL
748366	2013 QA_{4}	—	October 12, 2006	Kitt Peak	Spacewatch	·	740 m	MPC · JPL
748367	2013 QL_{6}	—	August 16, 2013	Ishigakijima	Hanayama, H.	NYS	650 m	MPC · JPL
748368	2013 QV_{6}	—	June 19, 2013	Mount Lemmon	Mount Lemmon Survey	·	680 m	MPC · JPL
748369	2013 QS_{7}	—	August 17, 2013	Haleakala	Pan-STARRS 1	V	430 m	MPC · JPL
748370	2013 QO_{8}	—	August 13, 2013	Kitt Peak	Spacewatch	T_{j} (2.98)	3.2 km	MPC · JPL
748371	2013 QR_{9}	—	September 20, 2008	Kitt Peak	Spacewatch	·	1.8 km	MPC · JPL
748372	2013 QB_{10}	—	August 26, 2013	Haleakala	Pan-STARRS 1	·	1.9 km	MPC · JPL
748373	2013 QF_{10}	—	August 15, 2013	Haleakala	Pan-STARRS 1	·	2.2 km	MPC · JPL
748374	2013 QP_{13}	—	September 19, 2006	Anderson Mesa	LONEOS	·	640 m	MPC · JPL
748375	2013 QA_{14}	—	August 27, 2013	Haleakala	Pan-STARRS 1	·	650 m	MPC · JPL
748376	2013 QV_{14}	—	October 21, 2006	Kitt Peak	Spacewatch	V	400 m	MPC · JPL
748377	2013 QJ_{15}	—	September 27, 2003	Kitt Peak	Spacewatch	·	1.6 km	MPC · JPL
748378	2013 QQ_{15}	—	April 16, 2007	Mount Lemmon	Mount Lemmon Survey	H	380 m	MPC · JPL
748379	2013 QK_{16}	—	August 28, 2013	Elena Remote	Oreshko, A.	·	1.0 km	MPC · JPL
748380	2013 QH_{19}	—	August 26, 2013	Haleakala	Pan-STARRS 1	·	1.9 km	MPC · JPL
748381	2013 QP_{20}	—	October 9, 2008	Mount Lemmon	Mount Lemmon Survey	·	2.1 km	MPC · JPL
748382	2013 QR_{21}	—	August 10, 2013	Kitt Peak	Spacewatch	·	2.2 km	MPC · JPL
748383	2013 QS_{21}	—	April 25, 2012	Mount Lemmon	Mount Lemmon Survey	·	1.6 km	MPC · JPL
748384	2013 QD_{22}	—	August 14, 2013	Haleakala	Pan-STARRS 1	·	2.1 km	MPC · JPL
748385	2013 QK_{24}	—	September 18, 2006	Kitt Peak	Spacewatch	·	930 m	MPC · JPL
748386	2013 QJ_{31}	—	August 12, 2013	Haleakala	Pan-STARRS 1	·	840 m	MPC · JPL
748387	2013 QB_{32}	—	August 29, 2013	Haleakala	Pan-STARRS 1	·	860 m	MPC · JPL
748388	2013 QU_{32}	—	June 15, 2013	Mount Lemmon	Mount Lemmon Survey	T_{j} (2.94)	2.2 km	MPC · JPL
748389	2013 QW_{33}	—	August 15, 2013	Haleakala	Pan-STARRS 1	EOS	1.3 km	MPC · JPL
748390	2013 QR_{38}	—	November 20, 2003	Kitt Peak	Spacewatch	EMA	2.3 km	MPC · JPL
748391	2013 QP_{39}	—	November 1, 2008	Mount Lemmon	Mount Lemmon Survey	·	2.5 km	MPC · JPL
748392	2013 QY_{41}	—	August 28, 2013	Palomar	Palomar Transient Factory	·	650 m	MPC · JPL
748393	2013 QU_{43}	—	April 25, 2007	Kitt Peak	Spacewatch	·	1.6 km	MPC · JPL
748394	2013 QE_{45}	—	August 30, 2013	Siding Spring-LCO	Lister, T.	·	530 m	MPC · JPL
748395	2013 QM_{46}	—	July 15, 2013	Haleakala	Pan-STARRS 1	H	400 m	MPC · JPL
748396	2013 QV_{47}	—	September 5, 2002	Socorro	LINEAR	·	970 m	MPC · JPL
748397	2013 QO_{49}	—	August 12, 2013	Haleakala	Pan-STARRS 1	·	2.6 km	MPC · JPL
748398	2013 QP_{49}	—	August 12, 2013	Haleakala	Pan-STARRS 1	·	520 m	MPC · JPL
748399	2013 QA_{51}	—	September 30, 2006	Mount Lemmon	Mount Lemmon Survey	·	740 m	MPC · JPL
748400	2013 QX_{55}	—	August 26, 2013	Haleakala	Pan-STARRS 1	·	2.0 km	MPC · JPL

== 748401–748500 ==
back to top

Designation			Discovery			Properties		Ref
Permanent	Provisional	Named after	Date	Site	Discoverer(s)	Category	Diam.	Ref
748401	2013 QM_{58}	—	August 10, 2013	Kitt Peak	Spacewatch	MAR	870 m	MPC · JPL
748402	2013 QP_{60}	—	October 27, 2008	Mount Lemmon	Mount Lemmon Survey	·	2.3 km	MPC · JPL
748403	2013 QB_{61}	—	August 27, 2013	Calar Alto	F. Hormuth	·	710 m	MPC · JPL
748404	2013 QE_{64}	—	August 25, 2005	Palomar	NEAT	·	1.1 km	MPC · JPL
748405	2013 QX_{64}	—	August 14, 2013	Haleakala	Pan-STARRS 1	TIR	2.1 km	MPC · JPL
748406	2013 QC_{65}	—	August 14, 2013	Haleakala	Pan-STARRS 1	·	1.9 km	MPC · JPL
748407	2013 QB_{66}	—	August 9, 2013	Oukaïmeden	M. Ory	·	750 m	MPC · JPL
748408	2013 QR_{66}	—	August 12, 2013	Haleakala	Pan-STARRS 1	·	2.6 km	MPC · JPL
748409	2013 QU_{66}	—	August 12, 2013	Haleakala	Pan-STARRS 1	·	2.1 km	MPC · JPL
748410	2013 QY_{68}	—	August 15, 2013	Haleakala	Pan-STARRS 1	·	2.4 km	MPC · JPL
748411	2013 QG_{70}	—	June 18, 2013	Mount Lemmon	Mount Lemmon Survey	·	2.9 km	MPC · JPL
748412	2013 QY_{70}	—	August 9, 2013	Kitt Peak	Spacewatch	NYS	910 m	MPC · JPL
748413	2013 QK_{72}	—	August 14, 2013	Haleakala	Pan-STARRS 1	·	990 m	MPC · JPL
748414	2013 QE_{73}	—	July 28, 2013	Kitt Peak	Spacewatch	·	1.1 km	MPC · JPL
748415	2013 QP_{77}	—	January 28, 2004	Kitt Peak	Spacewatch	·	2.2 km	MPC · JPL
748416	2013 QB_{78}	—	November 10, 2009	Kitt Peak	Spacewatch	AEO	880 m	MPC · JPL
748417	2013 QT_{80}	—	August 13, 2013	Kitt Peak	Spacewatch	·	2.4 km	MPC · JPL
748418	2013 QJ_{81}	—	January 11, 2010	Kitt Peak	Spacewatch	·	2.4 km	MPC · JPL
748419	2013 QY_{81}	—	August 28, 2006	Kitt Peak	Spacewatch	·	770 m	MPC · JPL
748420	2013 QB_{83}	—	September 23, 2003	Palomar	NEAT	·	630 m	MPC · JPL
748421	2013 QE_{85}	—	August 4, 2013	Haleakala	Pan-STARRS 1	H	500 m	MPC · JPL
748422	2013 QY_{89}	—	April 27, 2012	Haleakala	Pan-STARRS 1	THM	1.7 km	MPC · JPL
748423	2013 QA_{91}	—	August 15, 2013	Haleakala	Pan-STARRS 1	·	1.4 km	MPC · JPL
748424	2013 QR_{92}	—	September 20, 2009	Kitt Peak	Spacewatch	·	1.1 km	MPC · JPL
748425	2013 QO_{93}	—	May 16, 2012	Haleakala	Pan-STARRS 1	·	2.8 km	MPC · JPL
748426	2013 QV_{96}	—	October 26, 2014	Mount Lemmon	Mount Lemmon Survey	·	2.4 km	MPC · JPL
748427	2013 QR_{97}	—	August 26, 2013	Haleakala	Pan-STARRS 1	·	2.3 km	MPC · JPL
748428	2013 QU_{97}	—	December 19, 2003	Kitt Peak	Spacewatch	·	2.5 km	MPC · JPL
748429	2013 QY_{97}	—	November 28, 2014	Haleakala	Pan-STARRS 1	·	1.8 km	MPC · JPL
748430	2013 QO_{100}	—	August 26, 2013	Haleakala	Pan-STARRS 1	·	680 m	MPC · JPL
748431	2013 RT	—	September 1, 2013	Elena Remote	Oreshko, A.	BRA	1.1 km	MPC · JPL
748432	2013 RF_{1}	—	September 12, 2002	Palomar	NEAT	·	2.4 km	MPC · JPL
748433	2013 RV_{3}	—	May 13, 2012	Mount Lemmon	Mount Lemmon Survey	·	2.4 km	MPC · JPL
748434	2013 RW_{4}	—	November 27, 2006	Kitt Peak	Spacewatch	NYS	680 m	MPC · JPL
748435	2013 RR_{6}	—	August 30, 2008	Bergisch Gladbach	W. Bickel	·	2.2 km	MPC · JPL
748436	2013 RS_{7}	—	August 15, 2013	Haleakala	Pan-STARRS 1	·	1.5 km	MPC · JPL
748437	2013 RJ_{8}	—	September 26, 2006	Kitt Peak	Spacewatch	·	740 m	MPC · JPL
748438	2013 RS_{8}	—	August 28, 2013	Catalina	CSS	PHO	760 m	MPC · JPL
748439	2013 RF_{9}	—	March 31, 2012	Mount Lemmon	Mount Lemmon Survey	·	1.9 km	MPC · JPL
748440	2013 RH_{10}	—	August 12, 2013	Kitt Peak	Spacewatch	CLA	1.3 km	MPC · JPL
748441	2013 RO_{12}	—	September 2, 2013	Mount Lemmon	Mount Lemmon Survey	EOS	1.2 km	MPC · JPL
748442	2013 RZ_{19}	—	July 28, 2013	Kitt Peak	Spacewatch	·	670 m	MPC · JPL
748443	2013 RV_{20}	—	August 15, 2013	Haleakala	Pan-STARRS 1	·	880 m	MPC · JPL
748444	2013 RU_{21}	—	September 1, 2013	Mount Lemmon	Mount Lemmon Survey	·	870 m	MPC · JPL
748445	2013 RM_{23}	—	August 15, 2013	Haleakala	Pan-STARRS 1	·	650 m	MPC · JPL
748446	2013 RV_{27}	—	September 22, 2008	Mount Lemmon	Mount Lemmon Survey	·	1.6 km	MPC · JPL
748447	2013 RT_{35}	—	August 11, 2013	Tincana	Zolnowski, M., Kusiak, M.	·	3.6 km	MPC · JPL
748448	2013 RS_{37}	—	September 3, 2013	Haleakala	Pan-STARRS 1	EOS	1.3 km	MPC · JPL
748449	2013 RX_{37}	—	October 2, 2006	Mount Lemmon	Mount Lemmon Survey	·	900 m	MPC · JPL
748450	2013 RZ_{37}	—	August 29, 2006	Kitt Peak	Spacewatch	·	640 m	MPC · JPL
748451	2013 RK_{40}	—	February 26, 2012	Mount Lemmon	Mount Lemmon Survey	·	2.6 km	MPC · JPL
748452	2013 RD_{43}	—	September 9, 2013	Haleakala	Pan-STARRS 1	H	480 m	MPC · JPL
748453	2013 RF_{43}	—	September 10, 2013	Oukaïmeden	M. Ory	·	1.3 km	MPC · JPL
748454	2013 RY_{43}	—	September 5, 2013	La Sagra	OAM	·	970 m	MPC · JPL
748455	2013 RJ_{45}	—	August 14, 2013	Haleakala	Pan-STARRS 1	CLA	1.3 km	MPC · JPL
748456	2013 RE_{48}	—	August 19, 2006	Kitt Peak	Spacewatch	·	620 m	MPC · JPL
748457	2013 RG_{48}	—	February 5, 2011	Haleakala	Pan-STARRS 1	·	770 m	MPC · JPL
748458	2013 RH_{48}	—	September 3, 2013	Mount Lemmon	Mount Lemmon Survey	·	2.6 km	MPC · JPL
748459	2013 RR_{48}	—	September 2, 2013	Mount Lemmon	Mount Lemmon Survey	·	2.2 km	MPC · JPL
748460	2013 RJ_{51}	—	September 10, 2013	Haleakala	Pan-STARRS 1	H	420 m	MPC · JPL
748461	2013 RM_{53}	—	September 6, 2013	Kitt Peak	Spacewatch	·	2.5 km	MPC · JPL
748462	2013 RV_{56}	—	September 10, 2013	Haleakala	Pan-STARRS 1	·	2.5 km	MPC · JPL
748463	2013 RO_{58}	—	September 10, 2013	Haleakala	Pan-STARRS 1	·	2.5 km	MPC · JPL
748464	2013 RJ_{59}	—	September 10, 2013	Haleakala	Pan-STARRS 1	·	880 m	MPC · JPL
748465	2013 RF_{60}	—	September 14, 1996	Kitt Peak	Spacewatch	·	2.6 km	MPC · JPL
748466	2013 RH_{64}	—	September 12, 2002	Palomar	NEAT	·	770 m	MPC · JPL
748467	2013 RE_{71}	—	September 28, 2006	Kitt Peak	Spacewatch	·	630 m	MPC · JPL
748468	2013 RX_{71}	—	May 10, 2005	Mount Lemmon	Mount Lemmon Survey	·	940 m	MPC · JPL
748469	2013 RA_{72}	—	September 3, 2013	Kitt Peak	Spacewatch	H	400 m	MPC · JPL
748470	2013 RH_{76}	—	March 10, 2011	Kitt Peak	Spacewatch	EOS	1.4 km	MPC · JPL
748471	2013 RJ_{77}	—	September 3, 2013	Haleakala	Pan-STARRS 1	·	3.1 km	MPC · JPL
748472	2013 RE_{79}	—	March 30, 2011	Mount Lemmon	Mount Lemmon Survey	·	1.9 km	MPC · JPL
748473	2013 RN_{80}	—	March 28, 2012	Kitt Peak	Spacewatch	EUN	870 m	MPC · JPL
748474	2013 RL_{82}	—	September 13, 2013	Kitt Peak	Spacewatch	V	540 m	MPC · JPL
748475	2013 RA_{83}	—	September 5, 2013	Kitt Peak	Spacewatch	·	510 m	MPC · JPL
748476	2013 RE_{84}	—	September 5, 2013	Kitt Peak	Spacewatch	·	2.1 km	MPC · JPL
748477	2013 RS_{87}	—	November 17, 2008	Kitt Peak	Spacewatch	·	2.2 km	MPC · JPL
748478	2013 RT_{89}	—	September 6, 2013	Kitt Peak	Spacewatch	·	1 km	MPC · JPL
748479	2013 RT_{91}	—	December 1, 2008	Kitt Peak	Spacewatch	TIR	2.3 km	MPC · JPL
748480	2013 RX_{92}	—	September 21, 2006	Bergisch Gladbach	W. Bickel	·	740 m	MPC · JPL
748481	2013 RE_{96}	—	October 23, 2008	Kitt Peak	Spacewatch	·	2.7 km	MPC · JPL
748482	2013 RH_{97}	—	September 11, 2013	Palomar	Palomar Transient Factory	·	2.7 km	MPC · JPL
748483	2013 RR_{101}	—	April 20, 2012	Mount Lemmon	Mount Lemmon Survey	·	2.3 km	MPC · JPL
748484	2013 RA_{104}	—	September 1, 2013	Haleakala	Pan-STARRS 1	·	1.0 km	MPC · JPL
748485	2013 RM_{104}	—	September 3, 2013	Kitt Peak	Spacewatch	TIR	2.2 km	MPC · JPL
748486	2013 RH_{105}	—	March 14, 2011	Kitt Peak	Spacewatch	ARM	2.9 km	MPC · JPL
748487	2013 RE_{107}	—	December 20, 2009	Mount Lemmon	Mount Lemmon Survey	EUN	1.2 km	MPC · JPL
748488	2013 RK_{108}	—	September 20, 2006	Kitt Peak	Spacewatch	·	570 m	MPC · JPL
748489	2013 RE_{110}	—	February 16, 2016	Mount Lemmon	Mount Lemmon Survey	PHO	770 m	MPC · JPL
748490	2013 RH_{110}	—	September 12, 2013	Mount Lemmon	Mount Lemmon Survey	·	2.0 km	MPC · JPL
748491	2013 RJ_{110}	—	September 9, 2013	Haleakala	Pan-STARRS 1	EOS	1.5 km	MPC · JPL
748492	2013 RM_{110}	—	September 6, 2013	Catalina	CSS	·	1.1 km	MPC · JPL
748493	2013 RK_{111}	—	November 27, 2014	Haleakala	Pan-STARRS 1	·	2.4 km	MPC · JPL
748494	2013 RN_{111}	—	September 15, 2013	Haleakala	Pan-STARRS 1	·	3.1 km	MPC · JPL
748495	2013 RD_{112}	—	December 11, 2014	Mount Lemmon	Mount Lemmon Survey	·	2.4 km	MPC · JPL
748496	2013 RC_{116}	—	June 24, 1995	Kitt Peak	Spacewatch	·	680 m	MPC · JPL
748497	2013 RQ_{119}	—	September 3, 2013	Catalina	CSS	·	2.8 km	MPC · JPL
748498	2013 RT_{119}	—	September 6, 2013	Kitt Peak	Spacewatch	·	1.9 km	MPC · JPL
748499	2013 RX_{119}	—	January 30, 2016	Mount Lemmon	Mount Lemmon Survey	·	2.4 km	MPC · JPL
748500	2013 RY_{119}	—	September 10, 2013	Haleakala	Pan-STARRS 1	TIR	2.1 km	MPC · JPL

== 748501–748600 ==
back to top

Designation			Discovery			Properties		Ref
Permanent	Provisional	Named after	Date	Site	Discoverer(s)	Category	Diam.	Ref
748501	2013 RA_{120}	—	September 13, 2013	Kitt Peak	Spacewatch	(1298)	2.0 km	MPC · JPL
748502	2013 RK_{120}	—	September 15, 2013	Haleakala	Pan-STARRS 1	·	2.4 km	MPC · JPL
748503	2013 RV_{120}	—	September 14, 2013	Haleakala	Pan-STARRS 1	VER	2.0 km	MPC · JPL
748504	2013 RE_{121}	—	December 16, 2014	Haleakala	Pan-STARRS 1	·	2.0 km	MPC · JPL
748505	2013 RZ_{121}	—	September 3, 2013	Kitt Peak	Spacewatch	·	2.1 km	MPC · JPL
748506	2013 RF_{122}	—	September 5, 2013	Catalina	CSS	TIR	2.1 km	MPC · JPL
748507	2013 RY_{124}	—	September 5, 2013	Kitt Peak	Spacewatch	VER	2.5 km	MPC · JPL
748508	2013 RW_{125}	—	December 26, 2014	Haleakala	Pan-STARRS 1	·	2.7 km	MPC · JPL
748509	2013 RD_{126}	—	September 6, 2013	Mount Lemmon	Mount Lemmon Survey	NYS	950 m	MPC · JPL
748510	2013 RT_{126}	—	September 6, 2013	Westfield	R. Holmes	·	3.4 km	MPC · JPL
748511	2013 RS_{129}	—	September 10, 2013	Haleakala	Pan-STARRS 1	·	1.9 km	MPC · JPL
748512	2013 RJ_{131}	—	September 13, 2013	Mount Lemmon	Mount Lemmon Survey	·	2.1 km	MPC · JPL
748513	2013 RL_{131}	—	September 14, 2013	Haleakala	Pan-STARRS 1	L5	7.5 km	MPC · JPL
748514	2013 RX_{131}	—	September 2, 2013	Mount Lemmon	Mount Lemmon Survey	L5	8.0 km	MPC · JPL
748515	2013 RJ_{132}	—	September 13, 2013	Mount Lemmon	Mount Lemmon Survey	MAS	680 m	MPC · JPL
748516	2013 RO_{132}	—	September 6, 2013	Mount Lemmon	Mount Lemmon Survey	·	790 m	MPC · JPL
748517	2013 RM_{135}	—	February 25, 2011	Mount Lemmon	Mount Lemmon Survey	NYS	790 m	MPC · JPL
748518	2013 RU_{136}	—	September 6, 2013	Mount Lemmon	Mount Lemmon Survey	·	720 m	MPC · JPL
748519	2013 RG_{143}	—	September 14, 2013	Haleakala	Pan-STARRS 1	T_{j} (2.97) · 3:2	5.0 km	MPC · JPL
748520	2013 RP_{143}	—	September 14, 2013	Haleakala	Pan-STARRS 1	·	1.9 km	MPC · JPL
748521	2013 RA_{152}	—	September 13, 2013	Mount Lemmon	Mount Lemmon Survey	NYS	940 m	MPC · JPL
748522	2013 ST_{5}	—	September 17, 2013	Mount Lemmon	Mount Lemmon Survey	·	800 m	MPC · JPL
748523	2013 SM_{8}	—	August 28, 2013	Catalina	CSS	·	1.6 km	MPC · JPL
748524	2013 SV_{13}	—	September 1, 2013	Catalina	CSS	·	1.1 km	MPC · JPL
748525	2013 SM_{15}	—	August 18, 2006	Kitt Peak	Spacewatch	·	660 m	MPC · JPL
748526	2013 SE_{20}	—	September 3, 2013	Mount Lemmon	Mount Lemmon Survey	H	490 m	MPC · JPL
748527	2013 SG_{20}	—	September 24, 2013	Mount Lemmon	Mount Lemmon Survey	H	370 m	MPC · JPL
748528	2013 SS_{20}	—	September 3, 2013	Kitt Peak	Spacewatch	H	390 m	MPC · JPL
748529	2013 SJ_{21}	—	September 13, 2013	Kitt Peak	Spacewatch	EOS	1.8 km	MPC · JPL
748530	2013 SE_{28}	—	September 29, 2013	Palomar	Palomar Transient Factory	EUN	1.1 km	MPC · JPL
748531	2013 SH_{29}	—	September 10, 2013	Haleakala	Pan-STARRS 1	EUP	3.1 km	MPC · JPL
748532	2013 SZ_{29}	—	September 13, 2013	Palomar	Palomar Transient Factory	·	1.2 km	MPC · JPL
748533	2013 SB_{31}	—	September 12, 2013	Catalina	CSS	·	1.2 km	MPC · JPL
748534	2013 SE_{39}	—	September 13, 2013	Mount Lemmon	Mount Lemmon Survey	THM	1.8 km	MPC · JPL
748535	2013 SA_{41}	—	August 17, 2013	Haleakala	Pan-STARRS 1	H	380 m	MPC · JPL
748536	2013 ST_{41}	—	August 19, 2006	Kitt Peak	Spacewatch	·	610 m	MPC · JPL
748537	2013 SJ_{42}	—	September 15, 2013	Kitt Peak	Spacewatch	·	1.3 km	MPC · JPL
748538	2013 SY_{43}	—	February 7, 2011	Mount Lemmon	Mount Lemmon Survey	·	1.1 km	MPC · JPL
748539	2013 SZ_{44}	—	March 9, 2011	Mount Lemmon	Mount Lemmon Survey	·	2.6 km	MPC · JPL
748540	2013 SN_{49}	—	February 5, 2011	Haleakala	Pan-STARRS 1	·	870 m	MPC · JPL
748541	2013 SR_{50}	—	September 15, 2013	Catalina	CSS	·	3.0 km	MPC · JPL
748542	2013 SO_{52}	—	September 28, 2013	Piszkéstető	K. Sárneczky	THB	2.8 km	MPC · JPL
748543	2013 SC_{53}	—	November 1, 2010	Mount Lemmon	Mount Lemmon Survey	·	530 m	MPC · JPL
748544	2013 SB_{54}	—	September 29, 2013	Mount Lemmon	Mount Lemmon Survey	·	1.4 km	MPC · JPL
748545	2013 SH_{55}	—	August 29, 2013	Haleakala	Pan-STARRS 1	PHO	750 m	MPC · JPL
748546	2013 SW_{57}	—	September 4, 2002	Palomar	NEAT	·	940 m	MPC · JPL
748547	2013 SP_{62}	—	September 24, 2013	Mount Lemmon	Mount Lemmon Survey	L5	9.4 km	MPC · JPL
748548	2013 SG_{65}	—	November 18, 2008	Kitt Peak	Spacewatch	·	1.9 km	MPC · JPL
748549	2013 SO_{65}	—	November 9, 2008	Mount Lemmon	Mount Lemmon Survey	·	1.9 km	MPC · JPL
748550	2013 SS_{69}	—	September 25, 2006	Kitt Peak	Spacewatch	·	790 m	MPC · JPL
748551	2013 SC_{71}	—	September 10, 2013	Haleakala	Pan-STARRS 1	·	870 m	MPC · JPL
748552	2013 SG_{71}	—	September 27, 2008	Mount Lemmon	Mount Lemmon Survey	·	1.8 km	MPC · JPL
748553	2013 SR_{73}	—	October 9, 2008	Mount Lemmon	Mount Lemmon Survey	·	1.5 km	MPC · JPL
748554	2013 SH_{75}	—	September 15, 2013	Kitt Peak	Spacewatch	·	2.7 km	MPC · JPL
748555	2013 SG_{78}	—	November 10, 2010	Mount Lemmon	Mount Lemmon Survey	·	610 m	MPC · JPL
748556	2013 SX_{79}	—	April 3, 2011	Haleakala	Pan-STARRS 1	·	2.3 km	MPC · JPL
748557	2013 SX_{80}	—	March 21, 2001	Kitt Peak	SKADS	·	1.4 km	MPC · JPL
748558	2013 SG_{81}	—	August 6, 2007	Lulin	LUSS	·	2.6 km	MPC · JPL
748559	2013 SS_{81}	—	September 12, 2013	Mount Lemmon	Mount Lemmon Survey	·	2.3 km	MPC · JPL
748560	2013 SU_{84}	—	August 27, 2013	Haleakala	Pan-STARRS 1	·	2.9 km	MPC · JPL
748561	2013 SF_{91}	—	September 23, 2008	Kitt Peak	Spacewatch	·	1.9 km	MPC · JPL
748562	2013 SJ_{93}	—	February 26, 2012	Haleakala	Pan-STARRS 1	·	560 m	MPC · JPL
748563	2013 SZ_{94}	—	September 6, 2013	Kitt Peak	Spacewatch	·	2.7 km	MPC · JPL
748564	2013 SL_{98}	—	September 10, 2013	Haleakala	Pan-STARRS 1	·	2.3 km	MPC · JPL
748565	2013 SX_{98}	—	September 10, 2013	Haleakala	Pan-STARRS 1	·	1.3 km	MPC · JPL
748566	2013 SW_{101}	—	January 30, 2011	Haleakala	Pan-STARRS 1	·	1.8 km	MPC · JPL
748567	2013 ST_{103}	—	September 27, 2013	Haleakala	Pan-STARRS 1	EUP	2.6 km	MPC · JPL
748568	2013 SL_{104}	—	September 27, 2013	Haleakala	Pan-STARRS 1	·	3.0 km	MPC · JPL
748569 Bernhardhäusler	2013 SM_{107}	Bernhardhäusler	September 10, 2013	Haute Provence	J. Jahn	·	2.1 km	MPC · JPL
748570	2013 SB_{108}	—	September 16, 2013	Mount Lemmon	Mount Lemmon Survey	·	2.7 km	MPC · JPL
748571	2013 SM_{108}	—	September 17, 2013	Mount Lemmon	Mount Lemmon Survey	NYS	820 m	MPC · JPL
748572	2013 SE_{111}	—	April 29, 2012	Kitt Peak	Spacewatch	·	1.6 km	MPC · JPL
748573	2013 SU_{113}	—	September 16, 2013	Mount Lemmon	Mount Lemmon Survey	·	2.4 km	MPC · JPL
748574	2013 TS_{1}	—	October 1, 2013	Palomar	Palomar Transient Factory	·	1.8 km	MPC · JPL
748575	2013 TX_{6}	—	September 10, 2013	Haleakala	Pan-STARRS 1	DOR	1.7 km	MPC · JPL
748576	2013 TY_{7}	—	October 2, 2013	Elena Remote	Oreshko, A.	·	2.1 km	MPC · JPL
748577	2013 TU_{10}	—	October 2, 2013	Palomar	Palomar Transient Factory	EUP	2.4 km	MPC · JPL
748578	2013 TG_{18}	—	September 5, 2013	Kitt Peak	Spacewatch	·	2.7 km	MPC · JPL
748579	2013 TJ_{23}	—	September 14, 2013	Mount Lemmon	Mount Lemmon Survey	H	380 m	MPC · JPL
748580	2013 TY_{26}	—	September 6, 2013	Mount Lemmon	Mount Lemmon Survey	·	610 m	MPC · JPL
748581	2013 TB_{27}	—	September 15, 2013	Mount Lemmon	Mount Lemmon Survey	·	930 m	MPC · JPL
748582	2013 TC_{29}	—	September 14, 2013	Mount Lemmon	Mount Lemmon Survey	NYS	960 m	MPC · JPL
748583	2013 TU_{30}	—	October 11, 2007	Catalina	CSS	·	3.2 km	MPC · JPL
748584	2013 TZ_{30}	—	September 10, 2013	Calar Alto-CASADO	Mottola, S.	L5	7.0 km	MPC · JPL
748585	2013 TP_{32}	—	October 2, 2013	Kitt Peak	Spacewatch	·	1.1 km	MPC · JPL
748586	2013 TY_{36}	—	August 30, 2002	Palomar	NEAT	·	870 m	MPC · JPL
748587	2013 TJ_{37}	—	September 16, 2013	Catalina	CSS	H	430 m	MPC · JPL
748588	2013 TW_{40}	—	October 9, 2007	Kitt Peak	Spacewatch	·	2.1 km	MPC · JPL
748589	2013 TD_{41}	—	April 18, 2012	Mount Lemmon	Mount Lemmon Survey	H	380 m	MPC · JPL
748590	2013 TR_{44}	—	September 13, 2013	Mount Lemmon	Mount Lemmon Survey	·	2.6 km	MPC · JPL
748591	2013 TU_{45}	—	November 1, 2006	Mount Lemmon	Mount Lemmon Survey	·	820 m	MPC · JPL
748592	2013 TV_{48}	—	February 7, 2011	Mount Lemmon	Mount Lemmon Survey	NYS	980 m	MPC · JPL
748593	2013 TL_{50}	—	August 10, 2009	Kitt Peak	Spacewatch	MAS	520 m	MPC · JPL
748594	2013 TT_{51}	—	October 4, 2013	Mount Lemmon	Mount Lemmon Survey	·	2.7 km	MPC · JPL
748595	2013 TD_{53}	—	October 4, 2013	Kitt Peak	Spacewatch	·	700 m	MPC · JPL
748596	2013 TA_{55}	—	October 4, 2013	Mount Lemmon	Mount Lemmon Survey	·	500 m	MPC · JPL
748597	2013 TJ_{55}	—	May 13, 2011	Mount Lemmon	Mount Lemmon Survey	·	2.7 km	MPC · JPL
748598	2013 TG_{56}	—	October 4, 2013	Mount Lemmon	Mount Lemmon Survey	·	1.6 km	MPC · JPL
748599	2013 TQ_{56}	—	October 4, 2013	Mount Lemmon	Mount Lemmon Survey	L5	7.2 km	MPC · JPL
748600	2013 TH_{61}	—	November 18, 2008	Kitt Peak	Spacewatch	·	2.9 km	MPC · JPL

== 748601–748700 ==
back to top

Designation			Discovery			Properties		Ref
Permanent	Provisional	Named after	Date	Site	Discoverer(s)	Category	Diam.	Ref
748601	2013 TT_{63}	—	September 13, 2013	Mount Lemmon	Mount Lemmon Survey	·	2.7 km	MPC · JPL
748602	2013 TU_{64}	—	October 4, 2013	Mount Lemmon	Mount Lemmon Survey	·	2.6 km	MPC · JPL
748603	2013 TB_{65}	—	October 4, 2013	Mount Lemmon	Mount Lemmon Survey	TEL	1.0 km	MPC · JPL
748604	2013 TZ_{67}	—	August 15, 2013	Haleakala	Pan-STARRS 1	EOS	1.5 km	MPC · JPL
748605	2013 TA_{68}	—	August 15, 2013	Haleakala	Pan-STARRS 1	·	2.1 km	MPC · JPL
748606	2013 TS_{68}	—	September 6, 2013	Kitt Peak	Spacewatch	·	2.9 km	MPC · JPL
748607	2013 TD_{71}	—	September 17, 2013	Mount Lemmon	Mount Lemmon Survey	·	1.0 km	MPC · JPL
748608	2013 TB_{74}	—	October 3, 2013	Kitt Peak	Spacewatch	·	890 m	MPC · JPL
748609	2013 TK_{76}	—	October 9, 2002	Anderson Mesa	LONEOS	PHO	870 m	MPC · JPL
748610	2013 TF_{77}	—	February 5, 2011	Haleakala	Pan-STARRS 1	·	910 m	MPC · JPL
748611	2013 TB_{80}	—	October 9, 2013	Mayhill-ISON	L. Elenin	AMO +1km	1.1 km	MPC · JPL
748612	2013 TL_{85}	—	October 1, 2013	Mount Lemmon	Mount Lemmon Survey	·	990 m	MPC · JPL
748613	2013 TZ_{85}	—	April 8, 2006	Kitt Peak	Spacewatch	THB	2.5 km	MPC · JPL
748614	2013 TS_{86}	—	October 1, 2013	Mount Lemmon	Mount Lemmon Survey	·	2.5 km	MPC · JPL
748615	2013 TY_{90}	—	September 6, 2013	Kitt Peak	Spacewatch	·	950 m	MPC · JPL
748616	2013 TO_{92}	—	March 22, 2012	Catalina	CSS	H	460 m	MPC · JPL
748617	2013 TB_{93}	—	August 17, 2009	Kitt Peak	Spacewatch	·	900 m	MPC · JPL
748618	2013 TA_{95}	—	October 1, 2013	Kitt Peak	Spacewatch	PHO	780 m	MPC · JPL
748619	2013 TB_{96}	—	October 30, 2008	Kitt Peak	Spacewatch	EOS	1.6 km	MPC · JPL
748620	2013 TE_{97}	—	October 2, 2013	Kitt Peak	Spacewatch	MAS	550 m	MPC · JPL
748621	2013 TJ_{102}	—	February 25, 2011	Mount Lemmon	Mount Lemmon Survey	NYS	810 m	MPC · JPL
748622	2013 TG_{103}	—	October 2, 2013	Mount Lemmon	Mount Lemmon Survey	EOS	1.5 km	MPC · JPL
748623	2013 TJ_{103}	—	September 28, 2013	Piszkéstető	K. Sárneczky	·	2.5 km	MPC · JPL
748624	2013 TL_{103}	—	August 22, 2006	Palomar	NEAT	·	740 m	MPC · JPL
748625	2013 TN_{104}	—	October 3, 2013	Kitt Peak	Spacewatch	NYS	990 m	MPC · JPL
748626	2013 TF_{105}	—	October 3, 2013	Kitt Peak	Spacewatch	·	1.8 km	MPC · JPL
748627	2013 TF_{111}	—	May 17, 2009	Mount Lemmon	Mount Lemmon Survey	L5	9.5 km	MPC · JPL
748628	2013 TQ_{113}	—	October 3, 2013	Haleakala	Pan-STARRS 1	VER	2.4 km	MPC · JPL
748629	2013 TX_{114}	—	October 3, 2013	Kitt Peak	Spacewatch	MAR	700 m	MPC · JPL
748630	2013 TN_{117}	—	October 4, 2013	Mount Lemmon	Mount Lemmon Survey	·	900 m	MPC · JPL
748631	2013 TJ_{118}	—	October 4, 2013	Mount Lemmon	Mount Lemmon Survey	·	2.1 km	MPC · JPL
748632	2013 TO_{120}	—	September 14, 2013	Haleakala	Pan-STARRS 1	·	1.4 km	MPC · JPL
748633	2013 TM_{121}	—	October 4, 2013	Mount Lemmon	Mount Lemmon Survey	·	610 m	MPC · JPL
748634	2013 TA_{123}	—	August 26, 2013	Haleakala	Pan-STARRS 1	·	1.9 km	MPC · JPL
748635	2013 TW_{128}	—	March 15, 2012	Mount Lemmon	Mount Lemmon Survey	·	600 m	MPC · JPL
748636	2013 TU_{129}	—	October 6, 2013	Elena Remote	Oreshko, A.	·	2.2 km	MPC · JPL
748637	2013 TB_{132}	—	September 6, 2013	Mount Lemmon	Mount Lemmon Survey	·	910 m	MPC · JPL
748638	2013 TJ_{132}	—	October 11, 2013	Nizhny Arkhyz	Gerke, V.	·	2.6 km	MPC · JPL
748639	2013 TR_{133}	—	October 12, 2013	Oukaïmeden	C. Rinner	(1118)	2.6 km	MPC · JPL
748640	2013 TC_{134}	—	February 10, 2011	Mount Lemmon	Mount Lemmon Survey	NYS	930 m	MPC · JPL
748641	2013 TJ_{138}	—	September 6, 2013	Mount Lemmon	Mount Lemmon Survey	·	900 m	MPC · JPL
748642	2013 TL_{138}	—	September 4, 2013	Calar Alto	F. Hormuth	·	1.3 km	MPC · JPL
748643	2013 TC_{141}	—	October 5, 2013	Kitt Peak	Spacewatch	·	2.4 km	MPC · JPL
748644	2013 TY_{141}	—	September 10, 2007	Kitt Peak	Spacewatch	·	2.4 km	MPC · JPL
748645	2013 TS_{143}	—	October 1, 2013	Catalina	CSS	·	1.0 km	MPC · JPL
748646	2013 TP_{153}	—	November 8, 2013	Mount Lemmon	Mount Lemmon Survey	L5	7.1 km	MPC · JPL
748647	2013 TO_{159}	—	October 9, 2013	Kitt Peak	Spacewatch	L5	7.3 km	MPC · JPL
748648	2013 TU_{159}	—	October 6, 2013	Kitt Peak	Spacewatch	L5	9.2 km	MPC · JPL
748649	2013 TZ_{159}	—	October 3, 2013	Haleakala	Pan-STARRS 1	H	370 m	MPC · JPL
748650	2013 TE_{160}	—	October 13, 2013	Catalina	CSS	H	460 m	MPC · JPL
748651	2013 TN_{160}	—	October 1, 2013	Kitt Peak	Spacewatch	·	1.1 km	MPC · JPL
748652	2013 TL_{162}	—	September 15, 2013	Catalina	CSS	·	2.3 km	MPC · JPL
748653	2013 TC_{163}	—	September 13, 2007	Catalina	CSS	THB	2.5 km	MPC · JPL
748654	2013 TH_{167}	—	October 3, 2013	Haleakala	Pan-STARRS 1	·	1.6 km	MPC · JPL
748655	2013 TR_{167}	—	May 16, 2012	Haleakala	Pan-STARRS 1	·	2.3 km	MPC · JPL
748656	2013 TY_{169}	—	October 8, 2013	Kitt Peak	Spacewatch	·	2.4 km	MPC · JPL
748657	2013 TV_{170}	—	October 13, 2013	Kitt Peak	Spacewatch	VER	2.6 km	MPC · JPL
748658	2013 TF_{171}	—	October 3, 2013	Haleakala	Pan-STARRS 1	·	990 m	MPC · JPL
748659	2013 TZ_{173}	—	October 6, 2013	Catalina	CSS	·	900 m	MPC · JPL
748660	2013 TC_{174}	—	October 7, 2013	Kitt Peak	Spacewatch	·	2.4 km	MPC · JPL
748661	2013 TH_{174}	—	October 4, 2013	Kitt Peak	Spacewatch	·	2.3 km	MPC · JPL
748662	2013 TK_{174}	—	October 2, 2013	Haleakala	Pan-STARRS 1	·	2.7 km	MPC · JPL
748663	2013 TS_{174}	—	March 24, 2006	Kitt Peak	Spacewatch	EUP	2.9 km	MPC · JPL
748664	2013 TZ_{174}	—	February 14, 2015	Mount Lemmon	Mount Lemmon Survey	·	1.1 km	MPC · JPL
748665	2013 TD_{176}	—	October 7, 2013	Mount Lemmon	Mount Lemmon Survey	L5	6.9 km	MPC · JPL
748666	2013 TE_{176}	—	October 7, 2013	Kitt Peak	Spacewatch	·	770 m	MPC · JPL
748667	2013 TK_{177}	—	October 6, 2013	Mount Lemmon	Mount Lemmon Survey	·	940 m	MPC · JPL
748668	2013 TE_{178}	—	October 6, 2013	Mount Lemmon	Mount Lemmon Survey	·	750 m	MPC · JPL
748669	2013 TB_{181}	—	October 5, 2013	Haleakala	Pan-STARRS 1	TIR	2.0 km	MPC · JPL
748670	2013 TF_{182}	—	October 1, 2013	Mount Lemmon	Mount Lemmon Survey	·	2.5 km	MPC · JPL
748671	2013 TH_{182}	—	October 5, 2013	Haleakala	Pan-STARRS 1	·	3.1 km	MPC · JPL
748672	2013 TL_{182}	—	April 25, 2017	Haleakala	Pan-STARRS 1	·	2.6 km	MPC · JPL
748673	2013 TQ_{182}	—	October 2, 2013	Haleakala	Pan-STARRS 1	VER	1.9 km	MPC · JPL
748674	2013 TV_{182}	—	October 12, 2013	Mount Lemmon	Mount Lemmon Survey	·	2.1 km	MPC · JPL
748675	2013 TM_{183}	—	May 27, 2017	Haleakala	Pan-STARRS 1	NAE	2.0 km	MPC · JPL
748676	2013 TT_{183}	—	October 5, 2013	Haleakala	Pan-STARRS 1	L5	7.6 km	MPC · JPL
748677	2013 TX_{183}	—	October 3, 2013	Kitt Peak	Spacewatch	·	2.1 km	MPC · JPL
748678	2013 TH_{189}	—	October 5, 2013	Haleakala	Pan-STARRS 1	VER	2.2 km	MPC · JPL
748679	2013 TJ_{189}	—	October 5, 2013	Haleakala	Pan-STARRS 1	·	1.9 km	MPC · JPL
748680	2013 TL_{189}	—	October 11, 2013	Calar Alto-CASADO	Mottola, S., Hellmich, S.	VER	2.0 km	MPC · JPL
748681	2013 TO_{190}	—	October 13, 2013	Kitt Peak	Spacewatch	URS	2.4 km	MPC · JPL
748682	2013 TP_{190}	—	October 3, 2013	Mount Lemmon	Mount Lemmon Survey	·	2.7 km	MPC · JPL
748683	2013 TN_{193}	—	October 6, 2013	Kitt Peak	Spacewatch	·	2.6 km	MPC · JPL
748684	2013 TQ_{193}	—	October 3, 2013	Mount Lemmon	Mount Lemmon Survey	·	2.2 km	MPC · JPL
748685	2013 TQ_{196}	—	October 12, 2013	Kitt Peak	Spacewatch	·	1.0 km	MPC · JPL
748686	2013 TU_{196}	—	October 3, 2013	Haleakala	Pan-STARRS 1	·	2.5 km	MPC · JPL
748687	2013 TC_{199}	—	October 2, 2013	Haleakala	Pan-STARRS 1	KOR	1.0 km	MPC · JPL
748688	2013 TV_{201}	—	October 11, 2013	Catalina	CSS	·	2.3 km	MPC · JPL
748689	2013 TZ_{203}	—	October 7, 2013	Mount Lemmon	Mount Lemmon Survey	·	980 m	MPC · JPL
748690	2013 TQ_{209}	—	October 4, 2013	Mount Lemmon	Mount Lemmon Survey	·	2.5 km	MPC · JPL
748691	2013 TR_{211}	—	October 3, 2013	Haleakala	Pan-STARRS 1	L5	6.8 km	MPC · JPL
748692	2013 TP_{217}	—	October 5, 2013	Haleakala	Pan-STARRS 1	·	2.5 km	MPC · JPL
748693	2013 TQ_{217}	—	October 3, 2013	Mount Lemmon	Mount Lemmon Survey	·	2.6 km	MPC · JPL
748694	2013 TX_{217}	—	October 9, 2013	Mount Lemmon	Mount Lemmon Survey	·	2.3 km	MPC · JPL
748695	2013 TD_{223}	—	October 15, 2013	Mount Lemmon	Mount Lemmon Survey	·	540 m	MPC · JPL
748696	2013 TP_{249}	—	October 9, 2013	Mount Lemmon	Mount Lemmon Survey	L5	6.8 km	MPC · JPL
748697	2013 UO_{3}	—	October 23, 2013	Haleakala	Pan-STARRS 1	H	500 m	MPC · JPL
748698	2013 UY_{3}	—	October 24, 2013	Haleakala	Pan-STARRS 1	·	1.1 km	MPC · JPL
748699	2013 UA_{7}	—	October 24, 2013	Palomar	Palomar Transient Factory	JUN	840 m	MPC · JPL
748700	2013 UN_{7}	—	October 9, 2013	Mount Lemmon	Mount Lemmon Survey	NYS	840 m	MPC · JPL

== 748701–748800 ==
back to top

Designation			Discovery			Properties		Ref
Permanent	Provisional	Named after	Date	Site	Discoverer(s)	Category	Diam.	Ref
748701	2013 UW_{7}	—	October 26, 2013	Palomar	Palomar Transient Factory	·	3.5 km	MPC · JPL
748702	2013 UZ_{7}	—	September 26, 2013	Calar Alto-CASADO	Mottola, S.	·	1.8 km	MPC · JPL
748703	2013 UC_{9}	—	October 28, 2013	Haleakala	Pan-STARRS 1	H	400 m	MPC · JPL
748704	2013 UB_{15}	—	February 12, 2011	Mount Lemmon	Mount Lemmon Survey	·	890 m	MPC · JPL
748705	2013 UN_{19}	—	October 8, 2013	Mount Lemmon	Mount Lemmon Survey	·	2.3 km	MPC · JPL
748706	2013 UL_{22}	—	October 16, 2006	Catalina	CSS	·	650 m	MPC · JPL
748707	2013 UM_{22}	—	October 26, 2013	Kitt Peak	Spacewatch	NYS	770 m	MPC · JPL
748708	2013 UQ_{26}	—	October 23, 2013	Mount Lemmon	Mount Lemmon Survey	·	700 m	MPC · JPL
748709	2013 UO_{29}	—	October 25, 2013	Kitt Peak	Spacewatch	·	2.7 km	MPC · JPL
748710	2013 UG_{32}	—	January 17, 2015	Haleakala	Pan-STARRS 1	·	2.6 km	MPC · JPL
748711	2013 UT_{32}	—	October 24, 2013	Mount Lemmon	Mount Lemmon Survey	·	860 m	MPC · JPL
748712	2013 UU_{34}	—	October 26, 2013	Mount Lemmon	Mount Lemmon Survey	H	510 m	MPC · JPL
748713	2013 UH_{35}	—	October 26, 2013	Mount Lemmon	Mount Lemmon Survey	L5 · (291316)	7.3 km	MPC · JPL
748714	2013 UY_{36}	—	August 18, 2009	Kitt Peak	Spacewatch	NYS	990 m	MPC · JPL
748715	2013 UO_{38}	—	October 24, 2013	Mount Lemmon	Mount Lemmon Survey	NYS	1.0 km	MPC · JPL
748716	2013 UH_{41}	—	October 28, 2013	Mount Lemmon	Mount Lemmon Survey	·	2.7 km	MPC · JPL
748717	2013 UA_{50}	—	October 28, 2013	Mount Lemmon	Mount Lemmon Survey	EOS	1.6 km	MPC · JPL
748718	2013 VP	—	October 31, 2013	Mount Lemmon	Mount Lemmon Survey	·	2.5 km	MPC · JPL
748719	2013 VQ_{1}	—	November 1, 2013	Elena Remote	Oreshko, A.	·	1.1 km	MPC · JPL
748720	2013 VZ_{1}	—	November 2, 2013	Mount Lemmon	Mount Lemmon Survey	H	570 m	MPC · JPL
748721	2013 VJ_{4}	—	September 28, 2013	Mount Lemmon	Mount Lemmon Survey	H	460 m	MPC · JPL
748722	2013 VM_{10}	—	September 11, 2010	Mount Lemmon	Mount Lemmon Survey	·	840 m	MPC · JPL
748723	2013 VS_{10}	—	September 16, 2013	Mount Lemmon	Mount Lemmon Survey	·	2.7 km	MPC · JPL
748724	2013 VH_{11}	—	January 24, 2007	Mount Lemmon	Mount Lemmon Survey	NYS	960 m	MPC · JPL
748725	2013 VL_{12}	—	November 10, 2013	Mount Lemmon	Mount Lemmon Survey	H	520 m	MPC · JPL
748726	2013 VA_{13}	—	October 11, 2006	Palomar	NEAT	·	1.2 km	MPC · JPL
748727	2013 VN_{14}	—	September 12, 2013	Kitt Peak	Spacewatch	·	1.3 km	MPC · JPL
748728	2013 VV_{14}	—	November 8, 2013	Calar Alto-CASADO	Mottola, S., Hellmich, S.	L5	6.6 km	MPC · JPL
748729	2013 VG_{17}	—	November 20, 2006	Kitt Peak	Spacewatch	·	810 m	MPC · JPL
748730	2013 VE_{18}	—	September 30, 2013	Mount Lemmon	Mount Lemmon Survey	H	490 m	MPC · JPL
748731	2013 VL_{18}	—	October 14, 2013	Mount Lemmon	Mount Lemmon Survey	·	890 m	MPC · JPL
748732	2013 VQ_{20}	—	November 2, 2013	Mount Lemmon	Mount Lemmon Survey	H	420 m	MPC · JPL
748733	2013 VK_{21}	—	October 2, 2013	Catalina	CSS	H	510 m	MPC · JPL
748734	2013 VG_{24}	—	December 18, 2014	Haleakala	Pan-STARRS 1	L5	7.5 km	MPC · JPL
748735	2013 VN_{24}	—	October 7, 2010	Catalina	CSS	H	500 m	MPC · JPL
748736	2013 VK_{26}	—	November 2, 2013	Mount Lemmon	Mount Lemmon Survey	·	990 m	MPC · JPL
748737	2013 VK_{27}	—	November 1, 2013	Kitt Peak	Spacewatch	EOS	1.3 km	MPC · JPL
748738	2013 VD_{28}	—	October 23, 2009	Kitt Peak	Spacewatch	·	930 m	MPC · JPL
748739	2013 VA_{31}	—	November 2, 2013	Oukaïmeden	M. Ory	H	610 m	MPC · JPL
748740	2013 VV_{32}	—	November 12, 2013	Mount Lemmon	Mount Lemmon Survey	·	1.1 km	MPC · JPL
748741	2013 VO_{43}	—	November 8, 2013	Kitt Peak	Spacewatch	·	1.8 km	MPC · JPL
748742	2013 VC_{44}	—	October 4, 2007	Kitt Peak	Spacewatch	·	2.3 km	MPC · JPL
748743	2013 VJ_{48}	—	December 26, 2014	Haleakala	Pan-STARRS 1	EOS	1.9 km	MPC · JPL
748744	2013 VM_{48}	—	October 10, 2018	Mount Lemmon	Mount Lemmon Survey	·	1.9 km	MPC · JPL
748745	2013 VR_{52}	—	November 6, 2013	Catalina	CSS	EOS	1.8 km	MPC · JPL
748746	2013 VP_{54}	—	November 14, 2013	Mount Lemmon	Mount Lemmon Survey	·	970 m	MPC · JPL
748747	2013 VM_{55}	—	November 12, 2013	Mount Lemmon	Mount Lemmon Survey	·	900 m	MPC · JPL
748748	2013 VQ_{56}	—	November 1, 2013	Mount Lemmon	Mount Lemmon Survey	·	2.1 km	MPC · JPL
748749	2013 VZ_{59}	—	November 2, 2013	Mount Lemmon	Mount Lemmon Survey	L5	8.9 km	MPC · JPL
748750	2013 VB_{60}	—	November 11, 2013	Kitt Peak	Spacewatch	L5	6.5 km	MPC · JPL
748751	2013 VJ_{65}	—	November 9, 2013	Haleakala	Pan-STARRS 1	·	2.3 km	MPC · JPL
748752	2013 VS_{67}	—	November 1, 2013	Mount Lemmon	Mount Lemmon Survey	L5	6.0 km	MPC · JPL
748753	2013 WR_{1}	—	November 14, 2013	Mount Lemmon	Mount Lemmon Survey	H	440 m	MPC · JPL
748754	2013 WP_{3}	—	September 27, 2009	Mount Lemmon	Mount Lemmon Survey	·	960 m	MPC · JPL
748755	2013 WV_{10}	—	November 9, 2013	Haleakala	Pan-STARRS 1	·	1.2 km	MPC · JPL
748756	2013 WN_{14}	—	November 27, 2013	Haleakala	Pan-STARRS 1	HNS	1.0 km	MPC · JPL
748757	2013 WT_{16}	—	December 21, 2006	Kitt Peak	Spacewatch	NYS	720 m	MPC · JPL
748758	2013 WZ_{22}	—	February 17, 2010	Mount Lemmon	Mount Lemmon Survey	·	1.2 km	MPC · JPL
748759	2013 WZ_{26}	—	December 14, 2006	Palomar	NEAT	·	920 m	MPC · JPL
748760	2013 WA_{28}	—	November 16, 2006	Kitt Peak	Spacewatch	·	710 m	MPC · JPL
748761	2013 WG_{28}	—	April 15, 2012	Haleakala	Pan-STARRS 1	·	600 m	MPC · JPL
748762	2013 WU_{28}	—	November 26, 2013	Mount Lemmon	Mount Lemmon Survey	·	860 m	MPC · JPL
748763	2013 WV_{28}	—	November 26, 2013	Mount Lemmon	Mount Lemmon Survey	JUN	830 m	MPC · JPL
748764	2013 WF_{30}	—	September 23, 2009	Mount Lemmon	Mount Lemmon Survey	NYS	880 m	MPC · JPL
748765	2013 WA_{35}	—	November 2, 2013	Kitt Peak	Spacewatch	TIR	3.1 km	MPC · JPL
748766	2013 WJ_{36}	—	November 27, 2013	Haleakala	Pan-STARRS 1	T_{j} (2.97)	3.1 km	MPC · JPL
748767	2013 WC_{41}	—	July 10, 2012	Zelenchukskaya Stn	T. V. Krjačko, Satovski, B.	INA	2.6 km	MPC · JPL
748768	2013 WN_{46}	—	December 15, 2006	Kitt Peak	Spacewatch	NYS	1.0 km	MPC · JPL
748769	2013 WP_{48}	—	November 7, 2013	Mount Lemmon	Mount Lemmon Survey	TIR	2.5 km	MPC · JPL
748770	2013 WF_{50}	—	October 25, 2013	Kitt Peak	Spacewatch	·	2.4 km	MPC · JPL
748771	2013 WN_{54}	—	November 11, 2002	Palomar	NEAT	·	2.5 km	MPC · JPL
748772	2013 WV_{55}	—	January 7, 2010	Mount Lemmon	Mount Lemmon Survey	·	1.1 km	MPC · JPL
748773	2013 WW_{56}	—	October 8, 2013	Mount Lemmon	Mount Lemmon Survey	·	2.7 km	MPC · JPL
748774	2013 WQ_{58}	—	August 13, 2009	Dauban	C. Rinner, Kugel, F.	·	1.1 km	MPC · JPL
748775	2013 WZ_{69}	—	September 14, 2013	Mount Lemmon	Mount Lemmon Survey	·	920 m	MPC · JPL
748776	2013 WT_{70}	—	November 26, 2013	Mount Lemmon	Mount Lemmon Survey	·	560 m	MPC · JPL
748777	2013 WB_{77}	—	May 10, 2012	Haleakala	Pan-STARRS 1	PHO	800 m	MPC · JPL
748778	2013 WR_{79}	—	October 6, 2013	Mount Lemmon	Mount Lemmon Survey	·	820 m	MPC · JPL
748779	2013 WP_{84}	—	November 27, 2013	Haleakala	Pan-STARRS 1	·	2.8 km	MPC · JPL
748780	2013 WS_{84}	—	October 10, 2007	Mount Lemmon	Mount Lemmon Survey	TIR	2.1 km	MPC · JPL
748781	2013 WX_{91}	—	September 17, 2013	Mount Lemmon	Mount Lemmon Survey	V	560 m	MPC · JPL
748782	2013 WT_{93}	—	November 28, 2013	Mount Lemmon	Mount Lemmon Survey	·	3.0 km	MPC · JPL
748783	2013 WJ_{96}	—	February 11, 2004	Kitt Peak	Spacewatch	·	2.0 km	MPC · JPL
748784	2013 WL_{96}	—	November 8, 2013	Mount Lemmon	Mount Lemmon Survey	V	450 m	MPC · JPL
748785	2013 WB_{110}	—	July 16, 2013	Haleakala	Pan-STARRS 1	·	2.0 km	MPC · JPL
748786	2013 WE_{112}	—	May 24, 2011	Haleakala	Pan-STARRS 1	EOS	1.7 km	MPC · JPL
748787	2013 WW_{113}	—	November 26, 2013	Mount Lemmon	Mount Lemmon Survey	MAS	620 m	MPC · JPL
748788	2013 WG_{117}	—	November 28, 2013	Mount Lemmon	Mount Lemmon Survey	NYS	740 m	MPC · JPL
748789	2013 WW_{120}	—	October 26, 2013	Mount Lemmon	Mount Lemmon Survey	·	2.1 km	MPC · JPL
748790	2013 WG_{121}	—	January 13, 2015	Haleakala	Pan-STARRS 1	·	2.4 km	MPC · JPL
748791	2013 WU_{126}	—	November 28, 2013	Mount Lemmon	Mount Lemmon Survey	·	2.5 km	MPC · JPL
748792	2013 WC_{127}	—	November 28, 2013	Mount Lemmon	Mount Lemmon Survey	·	2.2 km	MPC · JPL
748793	2013 WD_{127}	—	November 28, 2013	Mount Lemmon	Mount Lemmon Survey	(43176)	2.2 km	MPC · JPL
748794	2013 WF_{127}	—	November 27, 2013	Haleakala	Pan-STARRS 1	·	2.3 km	MPC · JPL
748795	2013 WA_{130}	—	November 26, 2013	Haleakala	Pan-STARRS 1	·	950 m	MPC · JPL
748796	2013 WD_{130}	—	April 1, 2011	Haleakala	Pan-STARRS 1	NYS	870 m	MPC · JPL
748797	2013 WD_{133}	—	November 27, 2013	Haleakala	Pan-STARRS 1	NYS	930 m	MPC · JPL
748798	2013 WX_{134}	—	November 28, 2013	Mount Lemmon	Mount Lemmon Survey	·	2.4 km	MPC · JPL
748799	2013 WL_{142}	—	April 30, 2000	Kitt Peak	Spacewatch	·	2.2 km	MPC · JPL
748800	2013 WV_{142}	—	November 25, 2013	Haleakala	Pan-STARRS 1	·	2.0 km	MPC · JPL

== 748801–748900 ==
back to top

Designation			Discovery			Properties		Ref
Permanent	Provisional	Named after	Date	Site	Discoverer(s)	Category	Diam.	Ref
748801	2013 WS_{145}	—	November 26, 2013	Haleakala	Pan-STARRS 1	L5	8.2 km	MPC · JPL
748802	2013 XA_{3}	—	December 7, 2005	Kitt Peak	Spacewatch	H	450 m	MPC · JPL
748803	2013 XE_{4}	—	December 17, 2009	Kitt Peak	Spacewatch	·	1.9 km	MPC · JPL
748804	2013 XM_{4}	—	September 27, 1994	Kitt Peak	Spacewatch	H	500 m	MPC · JPL
748805	2013 XF_{5}	—	December 3, 2013	Piszkés-tető	K. Sárneczky, P. Székely	·	1.6 km	MPC · JPL
748806	2013 XH_{9}	—	October 14, 2013	Oukaïmeden	C. Rinner	T_{j} (2.97)	3.2 km	MPC · JPL
748807	2013 XZ_{10}	—	October 26, 2013	Kitt Peak	Spacewatch	·	2.0 km	MPC · JPL
748808	2013 XF_{16}	—	August 27, 2009	Catalina	CSS	·	900 m	MPC · JPL
748809	2013 XZ_{16}	—	September 15, 2009	Kitt Peak	Spacewatch	·	810 m	MPC · JPL
748810	2013 XC_{18}	—	May 27, 2012	Mount Lemmon	Mount Lemmon Survey	H	610 m	MPC · JPL
748811	2013 XQ_{22}	—	December 14, 2013	Haleakala	Pan-STARRS 1	H	480 m	MPC · JPL
748812	2013 XC_{28}	—	December 6, 2013	Haleakala	Pan-STARRS 1	·	640 m	MPC · JPL
748813	2013 XS_{34}	—	December 4, 2013	Haleakala	Pan-STARRS 1	·	890 m	MPC · JPL
748814	2013 XP_{35}	—	December 7, 2013	Haleakala	Pan-STARRS 1	·	2.6 km	MPC · JPL
748815	2013 XP_{37}	—	December 11, 2013	Mount Lemmon	Mount Lemmon Survey	(1547)	1.5 km	MPC · JPL
748816	2013 YZ_{1}	—	December 23, 2013	Mount Lemmon	Mount Lemmon Survey	·	1.2 km	MPC · JPL
748817	2013 YL_{6}	—	January 15, 1999	Kitt Peak	Spacewatch	·	890 m	MPC · JPL
748818	2013 YE_{7}	—	October 9, 2007	Mount Lemmon	Mount Lemmon Survey	·	2.0 km	MPC · JPL
748819	2013 YQ_{7}	—	October 16, 2009	Mount Lemmon	Mount Lemmon Survey	·	900 m	MPC · JPL
748820	2013 YF_{9}	—	December 15, 2013	Haleakala	Pan-STARRS 1	·	1.4 km	MPC · JPL
748821	2013 YQ_{9}	—	June 28, 2011	Mount Lemmon	Mount Lemmon Survey	·	3.4 km	MPC · JPL
748822	2013 YC_{12}	—	November 2, 2013	Mount Lemmon	Mount Lemmon Survey	·	1.8 km	MPC · JPL
748823	2013 YJ_{21}	—	May 16, 2012	Mount Lemmon	Mount Lemmon Survey	H	430 m	MPC · JPL
748824	2013 YS_{25}	—	November 28, 2013	Mount Lemmon	Mount Lemmon Survey	·	880 m	MPC · JPL
748825	2013 YC_{32}	—	December 25, 2013	Mount Lemmon	Mount Lemmon Survey	·	1.2 km	MPC · JPL
748826	2013 YK_{32}	—	October 24, 2005	Mauna Kea	A. Boattini	·	1.0 km	MPC · JPL
748827	2013 YD_{41}	—	December 3, 2013	Oukaïmeden	M. Ory	·	3.2 km	MPC · JPL
748828	2013 YX_{49}	—	October 22, 2009	Mount Lemmon	Mount Lemmon Survey	NYS	950 m	MPC · JPL
748829	2013 YB_{52}	—	November 28, 2013	Mount Lemmon	Mount Lemmon Survey	·	760 m	MPC · JPL
748830	2013 YD_{59}	—	September 23, 2012	Mount Lemmon	Mount Lemmon Survey	T_{j} (2.99) · 3:2	4.1 km	MPC · JPL
748831	2013 YP_{64}	—	December 28, 2013	Mayhill-ISON	L. Elenin	·	2.9 km	MPC · JPL
748832	2013 YH_{67}	—	December 11, 2013	XuYi	PMO NEO Survey Program	HNS	1.2 km	MPC · JPL
748833	2013 YE_{70}	—	December 30, 2013	Mount Lemmon	Mount Lemmon Survey	H	420 m	MPC · JPL
748834	2013 YR_{70}	—	November 9, 2009	Kitt Peak	Spacewatch	·	950 m	MPC · JPL
748835	2013 YH_{76}	—	December 11, 2013	Mount Lemmon	Mount Lemmon Survey	EUP	2.7 km	MPC · JPL
748836	2013 YK_{78}	—	December 5, 2002	Socorro	LINEAR	H	570 m	MPC · JPL
748837	2013 YM_{81}	—	January 2, 2009	Kitt Peak	Spacewatch	TEL	1.0 km	MPC · JPL
748838	2013 YJ_{83}	—	December 28, 2013	Kitt Peak	Spacewatch	·	2.5 km	MPC · JPL
748839	2013 YU_{83}	—	February 21, 2009	Mount Lemmon	Mount Lemmon Survey	EOS	1.5 km	MPC · JPL
748840	2013 YB_{85}	—	December 28, 2013	Kitt Peak	Spacewatch	·	2.3 km	MPC · JPL
748841	2013 YW_{85}	—	April 22, 2011	Kitt Peak	Spacewatch	PHO	980 m	MPC · JPL
748842	2013 YT_{86}	—	December 28, 2013	Kitt Peak	Spacewatch	·	2.5 km	MPC · JPL
748843	2013 YB_{89}	—	December 28, 2013	Kitt Peak	Spacewatch	NYS	850 m	MPC · JPL
748844	2013 YT_{91}	—	November 29, 2013	Haleakala	Pan-STARRS 1	·	1.0 km	MPC · JPL
748845	2013 YG_{92}	—	March 5, 2011	Mount Lemmon	Mount Lemmon Survey	·	580 m	MPC · JPL
748846	2013 YK_{92}	—	November 28, 2013	Nogales	M. Schwartz, P. R. Holvorcem	·	1.6 km	MPC · JPL
748847	2013 YS_{95}	—	June 19, 2004	Kitt Peak	Spacewatch	·	4.3 km	MPC · JPL
748848	2013 YH_{97}	—	November 12, 2005	Kitt Peak	Spacewatch	MAS	650 m	MPC · JPL
748849	2013 YO_{102}	—	May 3, 2011	Mount Lemmon	Mount Lemmon Survey	·	750 m	MPC · JPL
748850	2013 YQ_{106}	—	December 25, 2013	Kitt Peak	Spacewatch	·	2.7 km	MPC · JPL
748851	2013 YG_{113}	—	August 21, 2012	Haleakala	Pan-STARRS 1	·	1.2 km	MPC · JPL
748852	2013 YB_{117}	—	December 30, 2013	Mount Lemmon	Mount Lemmon Survey	·	3.2 km	MPC · JPL
748853	2013 YS_{119}	—	December 27, 2006	Mount Lemmon	Mount Lemmon Survey	·	900 m	MPC · JPL
748854	2013 YC_{121}	—	December 30, 2013	Haleakala	Pan-STARRS 1	NYS	830 m	MPC · JPL
748855	2013 YT_{121}	—	December 30, 2013	Haleakala	Pan-STARRS 1	·	1.7 km	MPC · JPL
748856	2013 YO_{125}	—	October 1, 2008	Mount Lemmon	Mount Lemmon Survey	MIS	2.0 km	MPC · JPL
748857	2013 YF_{129}	—	December 31, 2013	Kitt Peak	Spacewatch	·	1.1 km	MPC · JPL
748858	2013 YV_{131}	—	December 31, 2013	Mount Lemmon	Mount Lemmon Survey	·	960 m	MPC · JPL
748859	2013 YD_{136}	—	October 11, 2012	Kitt Peak	Spacewatch	EOS	1.6 km	MPC · JPL
748860	2013 YM_{139}	—	December 31, 2013	Haleakala	Pan-STARRS 1	H	410 m	MPC · JPL
748861	2013 YR_{139}	—	December 30, 2013	Mount Lemmon	Mount Lemmon Survey	·	1.8 km	MPC · JPL
748862	2013 YU_{140}	—	December 14, 2013	Mount Lemmon	Mount Lemmon Survey	·	1.3 km	MPC · JPL
748863	2013 YN_{143}	—	January 10, 2007	Mount Lemmon	Mount Lemmon Survey	V	560 m	MPC · JPL
748864	2013 YV_{148}	—	October 10, 2007	Catalina	CSS	·	2.8 km	MPC · JPL
748865	2013 YM_{150}	—	December 25, 2013	Mount Lemmon	Mount Lemmon Survey	·	1.5 km	MPC · JPL
748866	2013 YB_{153}	—	December 30, 2013	Kitt Peak	Spacewatch	·	2.3 km	MPC · JPL
748867	2013 YC_{155}	—	December 30, 2013	La Silla	A. Galád	·	1.5 km	MPC · JPL
748868	2013 YG_{156}	—	August 3, 2016	Haleakala	Pan-STARRS 1	·	930 m	MPC · JPL
748869	2013 YJ_{159}	—	February 16, 2015	Haleakala	Pan-STARRS 1	·	2.4 km	MPC · JPL
748870	2013 YP_{160}	—	June 25, 2017	Haleakala	Pan-STARRS 1	·	1.7 km	MPC · JPL
748871	2013 YY_{160}	—	June 15, 2018	Haleakala	Pan-STARRS 1	·	980 m	MPC · JPL
748872	2013 YM_{161}	—	December 31, 2013	Haleakala	Pan-STARRS 1	V	580 m	MPC · JPL
748873	2013 YX_{163}	—	December 25, 2013	Mount Lemmon	Mount Lemmon Survey	·	900 m	MPC · JPL
748874	2013 YP_{164}	—	December 25, 2013	Mount Lemmon	Mount Lemmon Survey	EOS	1.7 km	MPC · JPL
748875	2013 YT_{164}	—	December 31, 2013	Haleakala	Pan-STARRS 1	·	1.5 km	MPC · JPL
748876	2013 YF_{167}	—	December 24, 2013	Mount Lemmon	Mount Lemmon Survey	·	2.4 km	MPC · JPL
748877	2013 YG_{169}	—	December 31, 2013	Mount Lemmon	Mount Lemmon Survey	·	3.4 km	MPC · JPL
748878	2014 AY_{2}	—	January 1, 2014	Haleakala	Pan-STARRS 1	·	3.2 km	MPC · JPL
748879	2014 AE_{3}	—	January 1, 2014	Haleakala	Pan-STARRS 1	·	1.4 km	MPC · JPL
748880	2014 AH_{5}	—	October 26, 2013	Mount Lemmon	Mount Lemmon Survey	·	2.8 km	MPC · JPL
748881	2014 AZ_{5}	—	January 1, 2014	Mount Lemmon	Mount Lemmon Survey	EUN	1.0 km	MPC · JPL
748882	2014 AT_{6}	—	October 27, 2005	Kitt Peak	Spacewatch	NYS	750 m	MPC · JPL
748883	2014 AR_{9}	—	September 24, 2009	Mount Lemmon	Mount Lemmon Survey	·	820 m	MPC · JPL
748884	2014 AG_{11}	—	September 22, 2009	Mount Lemmon	Mount Lemmon Survey	(2076)	750 m	MPC · JPL
748885	2014 AL_{11}	—	January 1, 2014	Mount Lemmon	Mount Lemmon Survey	·	710 m	MPC · JPL
748886	2014 AP_{12}	—	December 27, 2013	Mount Lemmon	Mount Lemmon Survey	·	1.1 km	MPC · JPL
748887	2014 AG_{14}	—	January 1, 2014	Haleakala	Pan-STARRS 1	PHO	1.0 km	MPC · JPL
748888	2014 AV_{17}	—	December 27, 2006	Mount Lemmon	Mount Lemmon Survey	·	620 m	MPC · JPL
748889	2014 AO_{18}	—	January 1, 2014	Haleakala	Pan-STARRS 1	V	550 m	MPC · JPL
748890	2014 AB_{20}	—	January 1, 2014	Haleakala	Pan-STARRS 1	EUN	1.0 km	MPC · JPL
748891	2014 AL_{24}	—	May 3, 2008	Kitt Peak	Spacewatch	V	540 m	MPC · JPL
748892	2014 AO_{25}	—	November 20, 2009	Kitt Peak	Spacewatch	V	630 m	MPC · JPL
748893	2014 AL_{30}	—	January 3, 2014	Mount Lemmon	Mount Lemmon Survey	·	2.8 km	MPC · JPL
748894	2014 AT_{31}	—	December 4, 2007	Mount Lemmon	Mount Lemmon Survey	·	2.4 km	MPC · JPL
748895	2014 AW_{31}	—	September 17, 2012	Catalina	CSS	·	1.8 km	MPC · JPL
748896	2014 AR_{33}	—	December 23, 2013	Mount Lemmon	Mount Lemmon Survey	·	1.4 km	MPC · JPL
748897	2014 AY_{34}	—	December 30, 2002	Bohyunsan	Jeon, Y.-B., Lee, H.	·	1.1 km	MPC · JPL
748898	2014 AZ_{34}	—	December 12, 2006	Kitt Peak	Spacewatch	·	690 m	MPC · JPL
748899	2014 AZ_{35}	—	September 28, 2003	Kitt Peak	Spacewatch	·	560 m	MPC · JPL
748900	2014 AY_{38}	—	January 3, 2014	Mount Lemmon	Mount Lemmon Survey	·	880 m	MPC · JPL

== 748901–749000 ==
back to top

Designation			Discovery			Properties		Ref
Permanent	Provisional	Named after	Date	Site	Discoverer(s)	Category	Diam.	Ref
748901	2014 AE_{39}	—	November 19, 2009	Kitt Peak	Spacewatch	NYS	900 m	MPC · JPL
748902	2014 AB_{40}	—	August 20, 2008	Kitt Peak	Spacewatch	RAF	820 m	MPC · JPL
748903	2014 AK_{41}	—	November 28, 2013	Mount Lemmon	Mount Lemmon Survey	TIR	2.4 km	MPC · JPL
748904	2014 AG_{42}	—	December 30, 2013	Haleakala	Pan-STARRS 1	THB	3.0 km	MPC · JPL
748905	2014 AL_{42}	—	December 12, 2002	Palomar	NEAT	·	3.3 km	MPC · JPL
748906	2014 AM_{42}	—	December 14, 2013	Mount Lemmon	Mount Lemmon Survey	H	410 m	MPC · JPL
748907	2014 AS_{42}	—	January 6, 2014	Haleakala	Pan-STARRS 1	·	1.1 km	MPC · JPL
748908	2014 AJ_{43}	—	December 7, 2013	Catalina	CSS	·	1.1 km	MPC · JPL
748909	2014 AG_{44}	—	December 23, 2013	Mount Lemmon	Mount Lemmon Survey	·	960 m	MPC · JPL
748910	2014 AB_{51}	—	September 6, 2008	Mount Lemmon	Mount Lemmon Survey	HNS	1.0 km	MPC · JPL
748911	2014 AP_{51}	—	January 10, 2014	Catalina	CSS	H	450 m	MPC · JPL
748912	2014 AW_{51}	—	July 25, 2006	Palomar	NEAT	·	680 m	MPC · JPL
748913	2014 AQ_{53}	—	January 7, 2014	Catalina	CSS	·	2.8 km	MPC · JPL
748914	2014 AJ_{58}	—	January 1, 2014	Kitt Peak	Spacewatch	·	1.8 km	MPC · JPL
748915	2014 AK_{58}	—	January 1, 2014	Mount Lemmon	Mount Lemmon Survey	EUN	1.1 km	MPC · JPL
748916	2014 AX_{59}	—	January 10, 2014	Mount Lemmon	Mount Lemmon Survey	·	970 m	MPC · JPL
748917	2014 AS_{61}	—	January 3, 2014	Mayhill-ISON	L. Elenin	·	1.2 km	MPC · JPL
748918	2014 AL_{62}	—	September 28, 2008	Cerro Tololo	Wasserman, L. H.	·	1.4 km	MPC · JPL
748919	2014 AG_{63}	—	January 9, 2014	Mount Lemmon	Mount Lemmon Survey	·	3.2 km	MPC · JPL
748920	2014 AG_{65}	—	April 23, 2015	Haleakala	Pan-STARRS 1	V	620 m	MPC · JPL
748921	2014 AV_{67}	—	January 9, 2014	Mount Lemmon	Mount Lemmon Survey	V	510 m	MPC · JPL
748922	2014 AY_{67}	—	January 1, 2014	Kitt Peak	Spacewatch	·	2.6 km	MPC · JPL
748923	2014 AX_{68}	—	January 7, 2014	Mount Lemmon	Mount Lemmon Survey	EOS	1.3 km	MPC · JPL
748924	2014 AE_{69}	—	January 9, 2014	Mount Lemmon	Mount Lemmon Survey	·	2.0 km	MPC · JPL
748925	2014 AO_{69}	—	January 1, 2014	Haleakala	Pan-STARRS 1	LIX	2.6 km	MPC · JPL
748926	2014 AV_{72}	—	January 7, 2014	Mount Lemmon	Mount Lemmon Survey	V	510 m	MPC · JPL
748927	2014 AO_{73}	—	January 10, 2014	Mount Lemmon	Mount Lemmon Survey	·	2.2 km	MPC · JPL
748928	2014 BH_{7}	—	January 21, 2014	Kitt Peak	Spacewatch	H	550 m	MPC · JPL
748929	2014 BM_{13}	—	September 14, 2006	Mauna Kea	Masiero, J., R. Jedicke	THM	1.9 km	MPC · JPL
748930	2014 BZ_{13}	—	August 23, 2001	Kitt Peak	Spacewatch	·	970 m	MPC · JPL
748931	2014 BZ_{14}	—	March 12, 2010	Kitt Peak	Spacewatch	·	1.1 km	MPC · JPL
748932	2014 BR_{15}	—	March 26, 2003	Kitt Peak	Spacewatch	·	1 km	MPC · JPL
748933	2014 BU_{15}	—	January 1, 2014	Haleakala	Pan-STARRS 1	·	1.0 km	MPC · JPL
748934	2014 BC_{21}	—	January 7, 2014	Mount Lemmon	Mount Lemmon Survey	·	970 m	MPC · JPL
748935	2014 BT_{21}	—	January 7, 2014	Mount Lemmon	Mount Lemmon Survey	·	1.1 km	MPC · JPL
748936	2014 BU_{21}	—	December 11, 2013	Mount Lemmon	Mount Lemmon Survey	EUN	1.2 km	MPC · JPL
748937	2014 BJ_{24}	—	February 14, 2010	Kitt Peak	Spacewatch	·	940 m	MPC · JPL
748938	2014 BE_{27}	—	August 26, 2012	Haleakala	Pan-STARRS 1	V	560 m	MPC · JPL
748939	2014 BW_{27}	—	December 25, 2013	Kitt Peak	Spacewatch	·	2.3 km	MPC · JPL
748940	2014 BD_{33}	—	January 25, 2014	Haleakala	Pan-STARRS 1	T_{j} (2.3) · APO +1km	1.3 km	MPC · JPL
748941	2014 BA_{37}	—	September 19, 2001	Kitt Peak	Spacewatch	NYS	960 m	MPC · JPL
748942	2014 BC_{37}	—	January 23, 2014	Kitt Peak	Spacewatch	V	540 m	MPC · JPL
748943	2014 BW_{37}	—	January 23, 2014	Kitt Peak	Spacewatch	HNS	980 m	MPC · JPL
748944	2014 BN_{39}	—	February 9, 2006	Palomar	NEAT	H	610 m	MPC · JPL
748945	2014 BZ_{40}	—	January 24, 2014	Haleakala	Pan-STARRS 1	·	1.4 km	MPC · JPL
748946	2014 BB_{43}	—	October 19, 2012	Mount Lemmon	Mount Lemmon Survey	·	2.4 km	MPC · JPL
748947	2014 BH_{44}	—	January 23, 2014	Catalina	CSS	PHO	1.1 km	MPC · JPL
748948	2014 BJ_{52}	—	January 10, 2014	Kitt Peak	Spacewatch	·	890 m	MPC · JPL
748949	2014 BT_{54}	—	January 9, 2014	Mount Lemmon	Mount Lemmon Survey	·	1.0 km	MPC · JPL
748950	2014 BN_{59}	—	January 29, 2014	Kitt Peak	Spacewatch	·	1.0 km	MPC · JPL
748951	2014 BU_{59}	—	January 28, 2014	Mount Lemmon	Mount Lemmon Survey	·	2.5 km	MPC · JPL
748952	2014 BS_{60}	—	November 17, 2009	Mount Lemmon	Mount Lemmon Survey	NYS	1.0 km	MPC · JPL
748953	2014 BL_{61}	—	December 11, 2013	Mount Lemmon	Mount Lemmon Survey	EUN	960 m	MPC · JPL
748954	2014 BF_{62}	—	February 22, 2003	Palomar	NEAT	H	530 m	MPC · JPL
748955	2014 BG_{62}	—	January 3, 2014	Oukaïmeden	C. Rinner	MAR	1.1 km	MPC · JPL
748956	2014 BP_{62}	—	February 17, 2007	Mount Lemmon	Mount Lemmon Survey	·	740 m	MPC · JPL
748957	2014 BZ_{66}	—	December 20, 2009	Mount Lemmon	Mount Lemmon Survey	·	1.2 km	MPC · JPL
748958	2014 BH_{69}	—	January 29, 2014	Kitt Peak	Spacewatch	V	520 m	MPC · JPL
748959	2014 BC_{72}	—	January 23, 2014	Mount Lemmon	Mount Lemmon Survey	·	990 m	MPC · JPL
748960	2014 BL_{79}	—	January 25, 2014	Haleakala	Pan-STARRS 1	·	1.0 km	MPC · JPL
748961	2014 BS_{79}	—	January 24, 2014	Haleakala	Pan-STARRS 1	·	700 m	MPC · JPL
748962	2014 BX_{79}	—	January 24, 2014	Haleakala	Pan-STARRS 1	(5)	750 m	MPC · JPL
748963	2014 BV_{83}	—	January 24, 2014	Haleakala	Pan-STARRS 1	·	2.3 km	MPC · JPL
748964	2014 BC_{84}	—	January 28, 2014	Mount Lemmon	Mount Lemmon Survey	·	2.4 km	MPC · JPL
748965	2014 BG_{84}	—	January 26, 2014	Haleakala	Pan-STARRS 1	ARM	2.6 km	MPC · JPL
748966	2014 BZ_{86}	—	January 23, 2014	Mount Lemmon	Mount Lemmon Survey	·	950 m	MPC · JPL
748967	2014 BS_{87}	—	January 28, 2014	Kitt Peak	Spacewatch	·	1.4 km	MPC · JPL
748968	2014 CM	—	January 29, 2003	Palomar	NEAT	H	640 m	MPC · JPL
748969	2014 CA_{1}	—	November 26, 2005	Kitt Peak	Spacewatch	·	1.1 km	MPC · JPL
748970	2014 CE_{3}	—	February 1, 2014	Wildberg	R. Apitzsch	BRG	1.2 km	MPC · JPL
748971	2014 CV_{3}	—	September 21, 2012	Mount Lemmon	Mount Lemmon Survey	·	1.2 km	MPC · JPL
748972	2014 CX_{11}	—	October 24, 2005	Mauna Kea	A. Boattini	·	1.3 km	MPC · JPL
748973	2014 CW_{16}	—	January 30, 2014	Kitt Peak	Spacewatch	·	840 m	MPC · JPL
748974	2014 CC_{20}	—	January 27, 2003	Palomar	NEAT	·	3.5 km	MPC · JPL
748975	2014 CM_{21}	—	February 9, 2014	Catalina	CSS	·	1.3 km	MPC · JPL
748976	2014 CB_{25}	—	February 10, 2014	Haleakala	Pan-STARRS 1	·	1.1 km	MPC · JPL
748977	2014 CM_{26}	—	February 10, 2014	Haleakala	Pan-STARRS 1	·	2.4 km	MPC · JPL
748978	2014 CX_{26}	—	April 8, 2002	Palomar	NEAT	EUN	1.2 km	MPC · JPL
748979	2014 CZ_{26}	—	February 10, 2014	Haleakala	Pan-STARRS 1	·	1.4 km	MPC · JPL
748980	2014 CB_{27}	—	December 12, 2012	Mount Lemmon	Mount Lemmon Survey	JUN	860 m	MPC · JPL
748981	2014 CO_{27}	—	October 17, 2012	Haleakala	Pan-STARRS 1	·	1.0 km	MPC · JPL
748982	2014 CZ_{29}	—	December 24, 2017	Haleakala	Pan-STARRS 1	·	1.1 km	MPC · JPL
748983	2014 CY_{30}	—	February 11, 2014	Mount Lemmon	Mount Lemmon Survey	(5)	1.0 km	MPC · JPL
748984	2014 CK_{33}	—	February 9, 2014	Haleakala	Pan-STARRS 1	·	800 m	MPC · JPL
748985	2014 CP_{33}	—	February 9, 2014	Kitt Peak	Spacewatch	·	1.2 km	MPC · JPL
748986	2014 DD_{2}	—	January 28, 2014	Mount Lemmon	Mount Lemmon Survey	·	1.1 km	MPC · JPL
748987	2014 DV_{10}	—	February 2, 2014	Tenerife	ESA OGS	H	580 m	MPC · JPL
748988	2014 DF_{12}	—	November 28, 2013	Haleakala	Pan-STARRS 1	·	2.0 km	MPC · JPL
748989	2014 DC_{17}	—	January 9, 2014	Mount Lemmon	Mount Lemmon Survey	(2076)	670 m	MPC · JPL
748990	2014 DL_{21}	—	January 28, 2014	Mount Lemmon	Mount Lemmon Survey	·	1.3 km	MPC · JPL
748991	2014 DA_{25}	—	February 10, 2014	Haleakala	Pan-STARRS 1	·	2.4 km	MPC · JPL
748992	2014 DS_{31}	—	October 15, 2012	Haleakala	Pan-STARRS 1	PHO	870 m	MPC · JPL
748993	2014 DY_{33}	—	October 1, 2008	Kitt Peak	Spacewatch	·	1.1 km	MPC · JPL
748994	2014 DW_{35}	—	February 9, 2014	Haleakala	Pan-STARRS 1	MAR	730 m	MPC · JPL
748995	2014 DR_{36}	—	February 19, 2010	Kitt Peak	Spacewatch	·	1.1 km	MPC · JPL
748996	2014 DB_{40}	—	January 21, 2014	Mount Lemmon	Mount Lemmon Survey	·	910 m	MPC · JPL
748997	2014 DT_{45}	—	February 26, 2014	Mount Lemmon	Mount Lemmon Survey	·	1.1 km	MPC · JPL
748998	2014 DU_{47}	—	February 27, 2014	Kitt Peak	Spacewatch	MAR	810 m	MPC · JPL
748999	2014 DN_{49}	—	February 26, 2014	Haleakala	Pan-STARRS 1	·	950 m	MPC · JPL
749000	2014 DK_{56}	—	February 26, 2014	Haleakala	Pan-STARRS 1	·	1.0 km	MPC · JPL

back to top

== Meaning of names ==
As minor planet discoveries are confirmed, they are given a permanent number by the IAU's Minor Planet Center (MPC), and the discoverers can then submit names for them, following the IAU's naming conventions. The list below concerns those minor planets in the specified number-range that have received names, and explains the meanings of those names.

Official naming citations of newly named small Solar System bodies are approved and published in a bulletin by IAU's Working Group for Small Bodies Nomenclature (WGSBN). Before May 2021, citations were published in MPC's Minor Planet Circulars for many decades. Recent citations can also be found on the JPL Small-Body Database (SBDB). Until his death in 2016, German astronomer Lutz D. Schmadel compiled these citations into the Dictionary of Minor Planet Names (DMP) and regularly updated the collection.

Based on Paul Herget's The Names of the Minor Planets, Schmadel also researched the unclear origin of numerous asteroids, most of which had been named prior to World War II. This article incorporates text from this source, which is in the public domain: SBDB New namings may only be added to this list below after official publication as the preannouncement of names is condemned. The WGSBN publishes a comprehensive guideline for the naming rules of non-cometary small Solar System bodies.

Named minor planet	Provisional	This minor planet was named for...	Ref · Catalog
748569 Bernhardhäusler	2013 SM_{107}	Bernhard Häusler (b. 1957), German IT specialist.	IAU · 748569
