= List of minor planets: 763001–764000 =

The following is a partial list of minor planets, running from minor-planet number 763001 through 764000, inclusive. The primary data for this and other partial lists is based on JPL's "Small-Body Orbital Elements" and data available from the Minor Planet Center. Critical list information is also provided by the MPC, unless otherwise specified from Lowell Observatory. A detailed description of the table's columns and additional sources are given on the main page including a complete list of every page in this series, and a statistical break-up on the dynamical classification of minor planets.

Also see the summary list of all named bodies in numerical and alphabetical order, and the corresponding naming citations for the number range of this particular list. New namings may only be added to this list after official publication, as the preannouncement of names is condemned by the Working Group for Small Bodies Nomenclature of the International Astronomical Union.

Near-Earth obj.	MBA (inner)	MBA (outer)	Centaur
Mars-crosser	MBA (middle)	Jupiter trojan	Trans-Neptunian obj.
Unclassified

== 763001–763100 ==
Designation			Discovery			Properties		Ref
Permanent	Provisional	Named after	Date	Site	Discoverer(s)	Category	Diam.	Ref
763001	2011 TE	—	October 1, 2011	Drebach	G. Lehmann, A. Knöfel	·	1.3 km	MPC · JPL
763002	2011 TH_{4}	—	October 1, 2011	Piszkés-tető	K. Sárneczky, S. Kürti	·	940 m	MPC · JPL
763003	2011 TS_{7}	—	October 2, 2011	Bergisch Gladbach	W. Bickel	MIS	1.8 km	MPC · JPL
763004	2011 TE_{19}	—	October 1, 2011	Mount Lemmon	Mount Lemmon Survey	·	820 m	MPC · JPL
763005	2011 TE_{21}	—	October 3, 2011	Mount Lemmon	Mount Lemmon Survey	·	1.4 km	MPC · JPL
763006	2011 TV_{21}	—	October 1, 2011	Kitt Peak	Spacewatch	·	1.3 km	MPC · JPL
763007	2011 UQ_{3}	—	September 21, 2011	Kitt Peak	Spacewatch	(5)	840 m	MPC · JPL
763008	2011 UX_{3}	—	August 27, 2011	Haleakala	Pan-STARRS 1	(1547)	1.2 km	MPC · JPL
763009	2011 UX_{5}	—	October 18, 2011	Mount Lemmon	Mount Lemmon Survey	·	540 m	MPC · JPL
763010	2011 UA_{6}	—	October 18, 2011	Mount Lemmon	Mount Lemmon Survey	EUN	910 m	MPC · JPL
763011	2011 UM_{18}	—	October 19, 2011	Kitt Peak	Spacewatch	·	880 m	MPC · JPL
763012	2011 UZ_{23}	—	October 1, 2011	Kitt Peak	Spacewatch	·	500 m	MPC · JPL
763013	2011 UQ_{36}	—	October 19, 2011	Mount Lemmon	Mount Lemmon Survey	·	1.2 km	MPC · JPL
763014	2011 UF_{37}	—	October 19, 2011	Mount Lemmon	Mount Lemmon Survey	·	440 m	MPC · JPL
763015	2011 UN_{37}	—	September 29, 2011	Mount Lemmon	Mount Lemmon Survey	·	2.3 km	MPC · JPL
763016	2011 UU_{47}	—	October 18, 2011	Kitt Peak	Spacewatch	·	1.1 km	MPC · JPL
763017	2011 UV_{49}	—	October 18, 2011	Kitt Peak	Spacewatch	·	720 m	MPC · JPL
763018	2011 UK_{50}	—	October 18, 2011	Kitt Peak	Spacewatch	·	1.3 km	MPC · JPL
763019	2011 UW_{58}	—	September 12, 2007	Mount Lemmon	Mount Lemmon Survey	·	960 m	MPC · JPL
763020	2011 UA_{62}	—	October 21, 2011	Mount Lemmon	Mount Lemmon Survey	·	1.4 km	MPC · JPL
763021	2011 UT_{62}	—	October 20, 2011	Haleakala	Pan-STARRS 1	H	420 m	MPC · JPL
763022	2011 UA_{65}	—	August 11, 2002	Palomar Mountain	NEAT	·	1.2 km	MPC · JPL
763023	2011 UF_{65}	—	August 28, 2005	Kitt Peak	Spacewatch	·	2.4 km	MPC · JPL
763024	2011 UB_{68}	—	October 21, 2011	Mount Lemmon	Mount Lemmon Survey	HOF	1.9 km	MPC · JPL
763025	2011 UG_{68}	—	October 21, 2011	Mount Lemmon	Mount Lemmon Survey	·	3.0 km	MPC · JPL
763026	2011 UN_{68}	—	December 2, 2008	Kitt Peak	Spacewatch	·	450 m	MPC · JPL
763027	2011 UA_{69}	—	October 21, 2011	Mount Lemmon	Mount Lemmon Survey	·	2.4 km	MPC · JPL
763028	2011 UE_{82}	—	October 19, 2011	Kitt Peak	Spacewatch	·	1.5 km	MPC · JPL
763029	2011 UB_{84}	—	October 19, 2011	Kitt Peak	Spacewatch	·	1.2 km	MPC · JPL
763030	2011 UE_{85}	—	October 1, 2011	Mount Lemmon	Mount Lemmon Survey	·	1.3 km	MPC · JPL
763031	2011 UZ_{85}	—	November 7, 2007	Kitt Peak	Spacewatch	·	1.1 km	MPC · JPL
763032	2011 UG_{92}	—	January 30, 2004	Kitt Peak	Spacewatch	·	930 m	MPC · JPL
763033	2011 UL_{92}	—	September 30, 2011	Kitt Peak	Spacewatch	·	1.9 km	MPC · JPL
763034	2011 UO_{95}	—	October 19, 2011	Mount Lemmon	Mount Lemmon Survey	·	2.9 km	MPC · JPL
763035	2011 UZ_{95}	—	October 19, 2011	Mount Lemmon	Mount Lemmon Survey	·	1.2 km	MPC · JPL
763036	2011 UR_{99}	—	November 21, 1998	Kitt Peak	Spacewatch	·	1.2 km	MPC · JPL
763037	2011 UD_{109}	—	October 23, 2011	Haleakala	Pan-STARRS 1	H	320 m	MPC · JPL
763038	2011 UF_{110}	—	January 28, 2004	Kitt Peak	Spacewatch	·	1 km	MPC · JPL
763039	2011 UC_{111}	—	October 21, 2011	Mount Lemmon	Mount Lemmon Survey	·	1.3 km	MPC · JPL
763040	2011 UD_{111}	—	September 27, 2011	Mount Lemmon	Mount Lemmon Survey	·	1.3 km	MPC · JPL
763041	2011 UN_{118}	—	October 9, 2007	Kitt Peak	Spacewatch	EUN	810 m	MPC · JPL
763042	2011 UU_{119}	—	September 28, 2011	Kitt Peak	Spacewatch	·	450 m	MPC · JPL
763043	2011 UK_{121}	—	October 19, 2011	Mount Lemmon	Mount Lemmon Survey	·	2.0 km	MPC · JPL
763044	2011 UR_{121}	—	November 2, 2007	Kitt Peak	Spacewatch	·	1.3 km	MPC · JPL
763045	2011 UJ_{129}	—	September 21, 2011	Catalina	CSS	·	1.2 km	MPC · JPL
763046	2011 UL_{132}	—	October 21, 2011	Kitt Peak	Spacewatch	·	1.3 km	MPC · JPL
763047	2011 UZ_{136}	—	October 20, 2011	Mount Lemmon	Mount Lemmon Survey	·	540 m	MPC · JPL
763048	2011 UB_{137}	—	October 20, 2011	Mount Lemmon	Mount Lemmon Survey	·	1.1 km	MPC · JPL
763049	2011 UF_{138}	—	October 21, 2011	Mount Lemmon	Mount Lemmon Survey	·	1.3 km	MPC · JPL
763050	2011 UG_{138}	—	October 21, 2011	Mount Lemmon	Mount Lemmon Survey	·	1.3 km	MPC · JPL
763051	2011 UT_{147}	—	September 4, 2011	Haleakala	Pan-STARRS 1	·	830 m	MPC · JPL
763052	2011 UO_{152}	—	October 21, 2011	Kitt Peak	Spacewatch	·	1.3 km	MPC · JPL
763053	2011 UN_{154}	—	October 23, 2011	Haleakala	Pan-STARRS 1	·	470 m	MPC · JPL
763054	2011 UU_{160}	—	September 24, 2011	Mount Lemmon	Mount Lemmon Survey	·	1.1 km	MPC · JPL
763055	2011 UP_{162}	—	December 31, 2007	Mount Lemmon	Mount Lemmon Survey	·	930 m	MPC · JPL
763056	2011 UN_{165}	—	October 26, 2011	Haleakala	Pan-STARRS 1	·	1.6 km	MPC · JPL
763057	2011 UH_{167}	—	September 4, 2011	Haleakala	Pan-STARRS 1	·	1.1 km	MPC · JPL
763058	2011 UZ_{169}	—	September 22, 2011	Les Engarouines	L. Bernasconi	·	1.3 km	MPC · JPL
763059	2011 UB_{175}	—	October 24, 2011	Kitt Peak	Spacewatch	·	1.2 km	MPC · JPL
763060	2011 UT_{176}	—	September 25, 1998	Apache Point	SDSS	(5)	940 m	MPC · JPL
763061	2011 UG_{177}	—	September 17, 2001	Kitt Peak	Spacewatch	·	430 m	MPC · JPL
763062	2011 UZ_{178}	—	October 20, 2011	Mount Lemmon	Mount Lemmon Survey	·	1.0 km	MPC · JPL
763063	2011 UH_{179}	—	January 15, 2008	Mount Lemmon	Mount Lemmon Survey	·	1.2 km	MPC · JPL
763064	2011 UN_{180}	—	October 24, 2011	Haleakala	Pan-STARRS 1	H	360 m	MPC · JPL
763065	2011 UF_{185}	—	October 25, 2011	Haleakala	Pan-STARRS 1	·	920 m	MPC · JPL
763066	2011 UB_{188}	—	October 22, 2008	Kitt Peak	Spacewatch	·	510 m	MPC · JPL
763067	2011 UE_{191}	—	December 28, 2007	Kitt Peak	Spacewatch	·	1.1 km	MPC · JPL
763068	2011 UN_{191}	—	October 16, 2011	Kitt Peak	Spacewatch	·	1.2 km	MPC · JPL
763069	2011 UG_{196}	—	October 21, 2011	Kitt Peak	Spacewatch	·	1.3 km	MPC · JPL
763070	2011 UJ_{197}	—	October 21, 2011	Kitt Peak	Spacewatch	EUN	1.1 km	MPC · JPL
763071	2011 UJ_{203}	—	October 26, 2011	Haleakala	Pan-STARRS 1	(194)	960 m	MPC · JPL
763072	2011 UF_{205}	—	September 24, 2011	Haleakala	Pan-STARRS 1	·	960 m	MPC · JPL
763073	2011 UM_{206}	—	September 23, 2011	Haleakala	Pan-STARRS 1	·	1.0 km	MPC · JPL
763074	2011 UV_{211}	—	October 24, 2011	Mount Lemmon	Mount Lemmon Survey	·	1.2 km	MPC · JPL
763075	2011 UH_{215}	—	April 21, 2009	Kitt Peak	Spacewatch	·	2.4 km	MPC · JPL
763076	2011 UV_{218}	—	October 19, 2011	Mount Lemmon	Mount Lemmon Survey	ELF	2.3 km	MPC · JPL
763077	2011 UY_{221}	—	November 8, 2007	Kitt Peak	Spacewatch	·	800 m	MPC · JPL
763078	2011 UO_{227}	—	October 24, 2011	Mount Lemmon	Mount Lemmon Survey	·	1.1 km	MPC · JPL
763079	2011 UH_{230}	—	November 7, 2007	Kitt Peak	Spacewatch	·	780 m	MPC · JPL
763080	2011 UF_{232}	—	October 24, 2011	Mount Lemmon	Mount Lemmon Survey	(1298)	2.1 km	MPC · JPL
763081	2011 UL_{233}	—	February 13, 2008	Mount Lemmon	Mount Lemmon Survey	·	2.3 km	MPC · JPL
763082	2011 UA_{235}	—	October 24, 2011	Haleakala	Pan-STARRS 1	·	1.1 km	MPC · JPL
763083	2011 UN_{235}	—	October 24, 2011	Haleakala	Pan-STARRS 1	·	860 m	MPC · JPL
763084	2011 UR_{237}	—	May 4, 2005	Mauna Kea	Veillet, C.	·	1.2 km	MPC · JPL
763085	2011 UQ_{241}	—	October 25, 2011	Haleakala	Pan-STARRS 1	·	1.1 km	MPC · JPL
763086	2011 UK_{257}	—	October 24, 2011	Haleakala	Pan-STARRS 1	·	1.1 km	MPC · JPL
763087	2011 UM_{261}	—	October 23, 2011	Kitt Peak	Spacewatch	·	1.3 km	MPC · JPL
763088	2011 UE_{262}	—	October 25, 2011	Haleakala	Pan-STARRS 1	·	480 m	MPC · JPL
763089	2011 UP_{276}	—	October 25, 2011	Haleakala	Pan-STARRS 1	VER	1.9 km	MPC · JPL
763090	2011 US_{281}	—	November 14, 2007	Kitt Peak	Spacewatch	EUN	820 m	MPC · JPL
763091	2011 UV_{281}	—	October 28, 2011	Kitt Peak	Spacewatch	·	480 m	MPC · JPL
763092	2011 UX_{281}	—	October 28, 2011	Kitt Peak	Spacewatch	ADE	1.3 km	MPC · JPL
763093	2011 UU_{287}	—	December 5, 2007	Kitt Peak	Spacewatch	·	840 m	MPC · JPL
763094	2011 UO_{297}	—	October 21, 2011	Kitt Peak	Spacewatch	MAS	540 m	MPC · JPL
763095	2011 UF_{303}	—	September 21, 2011	Kitt Peak	Spacewatch	·	1.1 km	MPC · JPL
763096	2011 UZ_{304}	—	October 17, 2011	Kitt Peak	Spacewatch	·	1.2 km	MPC · JPL
763097	2011 UX_{306}	—	December 1, 2008	Kitt Peak	Spacewatch	·	500 m	MPC · JPL
763098	2011 UC_{308}	—	October 28, 2011	Kitt Peak	Spacewatch	(1547)	1.0 km	MPC · JPL
763099	2011 UZ_{311}	—	September 15, 2006	Kitt Peak	Spacewatch	·	1.3 km	MPC · JPL
763100	2011 UZ_{312}	—	October 19, 2011	Kitt Peak	Spacewatch	·	1.1 km	MPC · JPL

== 763101–763200 ==
back to top

Designation			Discovery			Properties		Ref
Permanent	Provisional	Named after	Date	Site	Discoverer(s)	Category	Diam.	Ref
763101	2011 UO_{316}	—	October 18, 2011	Mount Lemmon	Mount Lemmon Survey	·	1.1 km	MPC · JPL
763102	2011 UK_{324}	—	December 4, 2007	Mount Lemmon	Mount Lemmon Survey	·	1.0 km	MPC · JPL
763103	2011 UR_{330}	—	October 23, 2011	Haleakala	Pan-STARRS 1	·	1.3 km	MPC · JPL
763104	2011 UU_{339}	—	October 18, 2011	Piszkés-tető	K. Sárneczky, A. Szing	(1547)	1.2 km	MPC · JPL
763105	2011 UP_{344}	—	May 8, 2005	Mount Lemmon	Mount Lemmon Survey	·	1.5 km	MPC · JPL
763106	2011 UW_{345}	—	October 31, 2007	Kitt Peak	Spacewatch	·	1.0 km	MPC · JPL
763107	2011 UV_{346}	—	October 19, 2011	Mount Lemmon	Mount Lemmon Survey	·	2.5 km	MPC · JPL
763108	2011 UX_{346}	—	October 19, 2011	Mount Lemmon	Mount Lemmon Survey	·	1.2 km	MPC · JPL
763109	2011 UZ_{352}	—	October 20, 2011	Mount Lemmon	Mount Lemmon Survey	·	1.2 km	MPC · JPL
763110	2011 UO_{353}	—	September 29, 2011	Kitt Peak	Spacewatch	·	1.4 km	MPC · JPL
763111	2011 UT_{358}	—	October 20, 2011	Kitt Peak	Spacewatch	BRG	1.1 km	MPC · JPL
763112	2011 UV_{362}	—	May 12, 2010	Kitt Peak	Spacewatch	·	1.2 km	MPC · JPL
763113	2011 UG_{363}	—	October 22, 2011	Mount Lemmon	Mount Lemmon Survey	·	1.0 km	MPC · JPL
763114	2011 UJ_{363}	—	September 20, 2011	Kitt Peak	Spacewatch	·	1.2 km	MPC · JPL
763115	2011 UX_{366}	—	September 28, 2011	Kitt Peak	Spacewatch	·	1.1 km	MPC · JPL
763116	2011 UB_{375}	—	October 23, 2011	Mount Lemmon	Mount Lemmon Survey	EOS	1.6 km	MPC · JPL
763117	2011 UE_{377}	—	June 6, 2010	ESA OGS	ESA OGS	·	1.7 km	MPC · JPL
763118	2011 UY_{378}	—	September 30, 2011	Kitt Peak	Spacewatch	·	940 m	MPC · JPL
763119	2011 UC_{385}	—	October 11, 2002	Kitt Peak	Spacewatch	·	1.6 km	MPC · JPL
763120	2011 UA_{386}	—	October 25, 2011	Kitt Peak	Spacewatch	·	1.1 km	MPC · JPL
763121	2011 UU_{392}	—	September 24, 2011	Haleakala	Pan-STARRS 1	·	540 m	MPC · JPL
763122	2011 UN_{397}	—	September 23, 2011	Haleakala	Pan-STARRS 1	(5)	1.0 km	MPC · JPL
763123	2011 UG_{399}	—	October 23, 2011	Mount Lemmon	Mount Lemmon Survey	LEO	1.4 km	MPC · JPL
763124	2011 UO_{410}	—	October 19, 2011	Mount Lemmon	Mount Lemmon Survey	·	1.2 km	MPC · JPL
763125	2011 UU_{413}	—	October 26, 2011	Haleakala	Pan-STARRS 1	·	880 m	MPC · JPL
763126	2011 UQ_{416}	—	October 24, 2011	Haleakala	Pan-STARRS 1	·	1.2 km	MPC · JPL
763127	2011 UM_{417}	—	October 26, 2011	Haleakala	Pan-STARRS 1	·	1.3 km	MPC · JPL
763128	2011 UQ_{417}	—	October 26, 2011	Haleakala	Pan-STARRS 1	·	1.1 km	MPC · JPL
763129	2011 UN_{423}	—	March 12, 2013	Mount Lemmon	Mount Lemmon Survey	·	1.4 km	MPC · JPL
763130	2011 UQ_{423}	—	October 24, 2011	Kitt Peak	Spacewatch	·	1.2 km	MPC · JPL
763131	2011 UU_{423}	—	October 6, 2011	XuYi	PMO NEO Survey Program	EOS	1.6 km	MPC · JPL
763132	2011 UE_{425}	—	October 23, 2011	Haleakala	Pan-STARRS 1	·	980 m	MPC · JPL
763133	2011 UH_{425}	—	October 25, 2011	Haleakala	Pan-STARRS 1	·	1.0 km	MPC · JPL
763134	2011 UR_{426}	—	October 22, 2011	Mount Lemmon	Mount Lemmon Survey	·	1.1 km	MPC · JPL
763135	2011 UV_{426}	—	August 6, 2016	Haleakala	Pan-STARRS 1	·	2.9 km	MPC · JPL
763136	2011 UN_{428}	—	October 25, 2011	Haleakala	Pan-STARRS 1	HNS	780 m	MPC · JPL
763137	2011 UD_{429}	—	August 2, 2016	Haleakala	Pan-STARRS 1	·	3.0 km	MPC · JPL
763138	2011 UG_{430}	—	October 25, 2011	Haleakala	Pan-STARRS 1	·	1.1 km	MPC · JPL
763139	2011 UQ_{430}	—	October 28, 2011	Kitt Peak	Spacewatch	·	1.2 km	MPC · JPL
763140	2011 UC_{433}	—	October 25, 2011	Haleakala	Pan-STARRS 1	·	1.6 km	MPC · JPL
763141	2011 UO_{434}	—	October 26, 2011	Haleakala	Pan-STARRS 1	·	1.1 km	MPC · JPL
763142	2011 UP_{434}	—	October 24, 2011	Haleakala	Pan-STARRS 1	·	2.2 km	MPC · JPL
763143	2011 UR_{434}	—	March 5, 2013	Haleakala	Pan-STARRS 1	·	1.1 km	MPC · JPL
763144	2011 UP_{435}	—	October 19, 2011	Mount Lemmon	Mount Lemmon Survey	·	1.1 km	MPC · JPL
763145	2011 UQ_{435}	—	October 19, 2011	Kitt Peak	Spacewatch	MAR	810 m	MPC · JPL
763146	2011 UT_{435}	—	October 31, 2011	Kitt Peak	Spacewatch	·	1.3 km	MPC · JPL
763147	2011 UO_{436}	—	May 26, 2015	Haleakala	Pan-STARRS 1	·	2.4 km	MPC · JPL
763148	2011 US_{436}	—	October 24, 2011	Kitt Peak	Spacewatch	·	920 m	MPC · JPL
763149	2011 UW_{436}	—	October 23, 2011	Haleakala	Pan-STARRS 1	·	1.3 km	MPC · JPL
763150	2011 UR_{437}	—	December 23, 2017	Haleakala	Pan-STARRS 1	·	1.5 km	MPC · JPL
763151	2011 UV_{440}	—	October 27, 2011	Mount Lemmon	Mount Lemmon Survey	·	860 m	MPC · JPL
763152	2011 UD_{441}	—	December 29, 2017	Haleakala	Pan-STARRS 1	·	1.1 km	MPC · JPL
763153	2011 UF_{441}	—	April 23, 2014	Cerro Tololo	DECam	·	1.1 km	MPC · JPL
763154	2011 UG_{441}	—	October 31, 2011	Kitt Peak	Spacewatch	·	1.4 km	MPC · JPL
763155	2011 UP_{441}	—	August 3, 2016	Haleakala	Pan-STARRS 1	·	2.7 km	MPC · JPL
763156	2011 UQ_{441}	—	February 9, 2016	Haleakala	Pan-STARRS 1	·	460 m	MPC · JPL
763157	2011 US_{441}	—	October 26, 2011	Haleakala	Pan-STARRS 1	·	1.4 km	MPC · JPL
763158	2011 UY_{441}	—	October 24, 2011	Haleakala	Pan-STARRS 1	·	1.1 km	MPC · JPL
763159	2011 UR_{442}	—	February 26, 2014	Haleakala	Pan-STARRS 1	HOF	2.1 km	MPC · JPL
763160	2011 UU_{442}	—	October 21, 2017	Mount Lemmon	Mount Lemmon Survey	LUT	3.1 km	MPC · JPL
763161	2011 UV_{442}	—	July 12, 2016	Mount Lemmon	Mount Lemmon Survey	·	2.4 km	MPC · JPL
763162	2011 UK_{443}	—	October 18, 2011	Haleakala	Pan-STARRS 1	EUN	840 m	MPC · JPL
763163	2011 UX_{443}	—	October 24, 2011	Haleakala	Pan-STARRS 1	·	970 m	MPC · JPL
763164	2011 UN_{445}	—	September 11, 2015	Haleakala	Pan-STARRS 1	MAR	570 m	MPC · JPL
763165	2011 UY_{445}	—	December 22, 2012	Haleakala	Pan-STARRS 1	BRG	1.1 km	MPC · JPL
763166	2011 UD_{448}	—	October 25, 2011	Haleakala	Pan-STARRS 1	L4	6.4 km	MPC · JPL
763167	2011 UO_{448}	—	October 23, 2011	Mount Lemmon	Mount Lemmon Survey	·	1.2 km	MPC · JPL
763168	2011 UZ_{448}	—	October 23, 2011	Mount Lemmon	Mount Lemmon Survey	·	1.3 km	MPC · JPL
763169	2011 UR_{450}	—	October 22, 2011	Bergisch Gladbach	W. Bickel	·	1.3 km	MPC · JPL
763170	2011 UA_{451}	—	October 24, 2011	Haleakala	Pan-STARRS 1	·	1.1 km	MPC · JPL
763171	2011 US_{453}	—	October 19, 2011	Mount Lemmon	Mount Lemmon Survey	THM	1.7 km	MPC · JPL
763172	2011 UY_{455}	—	October 26, 2011	Haleakala	Pan-STARRS 1	·	1.3 km	MPC · JPL
763173	2011 UT_{458}	—	October 25, 2011	Haleakala	Pan-STARRS 1	·	1.6 km	MPC · JPL
763174	2011 UZ_{458}	—	October 27, 2011	Mount Lemmon	Mount Lemmon Survey	·	1.4 km	MPC · JPL
763175	2011 UQ_{462}	—	October 24, 2011	Haleakala	Pan-STARRS 1	·	1.4 km	MPC · JPL
763176	2011 UF_{468}	—	October 23, 2011	Haleakala	Pan-STARRS 1	ADE	1.4 km	MPC · JPL
763177	2011 US_{468}	—	October 19, 2011	Mount Lemmon	Mount Lemmon Survey	·	1.1 km	MPC · JPL
763178	2011 UQ_{469}	—	October 26, 2011	Haleakala	Pan-STARRS 1	EOS	1.5 km	MPC · JPL
763179	2011 UY_{469}	—	October 18, 2011	Haleakala	Pan-STARRS 1	EUN	870 m	MPC · JPL
763180	2011 UC_{476}	—	October 22, 2011	Mount Lemmon	Mount Lemmon Survey	AGN	920 m	MPC · JPL
763181	2011 UX_{481}	—	October 23, 2011	Haleakala	Pan-STARRS 1	L4	6.9 km	MPC · JPL
763182	2011 UQ_{488}	—	October 22, 2011	Westfield	International Astronomical Search Collaboration	·	1.0 km	MPC · JPL
763183	2011 UY_{490}	—	October 21, 2011	Mount Lemmon	Mount Lemmon Survey	L4	5.8 km	MPC · JPL
763184	2011 UP_{493}	—	October 23, 2011	Mount Lemmon	Mount Lemmon Survey	·	2.2 km	MPC · JPL
763185	2011 UJ_{502}	—	October 24, 2011	Haleakala	Pan-STARRS 1	·	1.3 km	MPC · JPL
763186	2011 UL_{502}	—	October 27, 2011	Mount Lemmon	Mount Lemmon Survey	·	1.1 km	MPC · JPL
763187	2011 VD_{17}	—	September 3, 2007	Catalina	CSS	MAS	530 m	MPC · JPL
763188	2011 VL_{19}	—	November 15, 2011	Mount Lemmon	Mount Lemmon Survey	·	1.1 km	MPC · JPL
763189	2011 VY_{19}	—	September 20, 2011	Mount Lemmon	Mount Lemmon Survey	·	2.7 km	MPC · JPL
763190	2011 VD_{21}	—	December 17, 2007	Mount Lemmon	Mount Lemmon Survey	·	1.2 km	MPC · JPL
763191	2011 VH_{21}	—	August 22, 2006	Saint-Sulpice	B. Christophe	·	1.1 km	MPC · JPL
763192	2011 VB_{22}	—	October 24, 2011	Haleakala	Pan-STARRS 1	·	1.6 km	MPC · JPL
763193	2011 VQ_{26}	—	May 3, 2014	Mount Lemmon	Mount Lemmon Survey	·	1.4 km	MPC · JPL
763194	2011 VN_{28}	—	June 14, 2015	Mount Lemmon	Mount Lemmon Survey	·	2.9 km	MPC · JPL
763195	2011 VG_{29}	—	October 29, 2017	Haleakala	Pan-STARRS 1	·	1.9 km	MPC · JPL
763196	2011 VS_{29}	—	January 17, 2013	Haleakala	Pan-STARRS 1	EUN	1.1 km	MPC · JPL
763197	2011 VX_{29}	—	November 3, 2011	Kitt Peak	Spacewatch	·	1.1 km	MPC · JPL
763198	2011 VR_{35}	—	December 4, 2007	Mount Lemmon	Mount Lemmon Survey	·	1.4 km	MPC · JPL
763199	2011 VT_{37}	—	November 3, 2011	Mount Lemmon	Mount Lemmon Survey	·	1.0 km	MPC · JPL
763200	2011 WU_{7}	—	October 30, 2011	Kitt Peak	Spacewatch	·	1.0 km	MPC · JPL

== 763201–763300 ==
back to top

Designation			Discovery			Properties		Ref
Permanent	Provisional	Named after	Date	Site	Discoverer(s)	Category	Diam.	Ref
763201	2011 WR_{9}	—	November 3, 2011	Kitt Peak	Spacewatch	·	930 m	MPC · JPL
763202	2011 WQ_{17}	—	November 17, 2011	Kitt Peak	Spacewatch	·	920 m	MPC · JPL
763203	2011 WH_{21}	—	August 29, 2006	Kitt Peak	Spacewatch	·	1.2 km	MPC · JPL
763204	2011 WX_{23}	—	November 17, 2011	Mount Lemmon	Mount Lemmon Survey	·	960 m	MPC · JPL
763205	2011 WB_{24}	—	November 17, 2011	Mount Lemmon	Mount Lemmon Survey	·	1.0 km	MPC · JPL
763206	2011 WB_{28}	—	October 25, 2011	Haleakala	Pan-STARRS 1	·	1.5 km	MPC · JPL
763207	2011 WE_{29}	—	October 24, 2011	Haleakala	Pan-STARRS 1	·	1.2 km	MPC · JPL
763208	2011 WF_{31}	—	October 20, 2011	Mount Lemmon	Mount Lemmon Survey	·	1.2 km	MPC · JPL
763209	2011 WO_{32}	—	November 1, 2011	Kitt Peak	Spacewatch	·	1.2 km	MPC · JPL
763210	2011 WC_{34}	—	October 26, 2011	Haleakala	Pan-STARRS 1	BRG	1.0 km	MPC · JPL
763211	2011 WN_{36}	—	November 1, 2011	ESA OGS	ESA OGS	·	860 m	MPC · JPL
763212	2011 WO_{37}	—	September 23, 2011	Mount Lemmon	Mount Lemmon Survey	·	1.1 km	MPC · JPL
763213	2011 WU_{37}	—	October 19, 2011	Kitt Peak	Spacewatch	·	430 m	MPC · JPL
763214	2011 WD_{40}	—	September 24, 2011	Haleakala	Pan-STARRS 1	EUN	650 m	MPC · JPL
763215	2011 WD_{45}	—	December 16, 2007	Kitt Peak	Spacewatch	·	1 km	MPC · JPL
763216	2011 WG_{45}	—	October 26, 2011	Haleakala	Pan-STARRS 1	EOS	1.3 km	MPC · JPL
763217	2011 WT_{57}	—	October 25, 2011	Haleakala	Pan-STARRS 1	EUN	900 m	MPC · JPL
763218	2011 WZ_{63}	—	November 24, 2011	Mount Lemmon	Mount Lemmon Survey	·	970 m	MPC · JPL
763219	2011 WG_{67}	—	October 26, 2011	Haleakala	Pan-STARRS 1	·	2.2 km	MPC · JPL
763220	2011 WJ_{67}	—	October 26, 2011	Haleakala	Pan-STARRS 1	·	1.5 km	MPC · JPL
763221	2011 WC_{74}	—	December 19, 2007	Mount Lemmon	Mount Lemmon Survey	·	950 m	MPC · JPL
763222	2011 WO_{76}	—	October 30, 2011	Mount Lemmon	Mount Lemmon Survey	·	970 m	MPC · JPL
763223	2011 WG_{77}	—	May 25, 2006	Mount Lemmon	Mount Lemmon Survey	·	1.4 km	MPC · JPL
763224	2011 WC_{84}	—	December 5, 2007	Kitt Peak	Spacewatch	JUN	810 m	MPC · JPL
763225	2011 WA_{85}	—	November 24, 2011	Haleakala	Pan-STARRS 1	·	1.1 km	MPC · JPL
763226	2011 WO_{92}	—	October 25, 2011	Haleakala	Pan-STARRS 1	·	1.2 km	MPC · JPL
763227	2011 WP_{92}	—	October 28, 2011	Mount Lemmon	Mount Lemmon Survey	JUN	630 m	MPC · JPL
763228	2011 WB_{93}	—	November 27, 2011	Kitt Peak	Spacewatch	·	1.5 km	MPC · JPL
763229	2011 WL_{95}	—	December 18, 2007	Kitt Peak	Spacewatch	·	990 m	MPC · JPL
763230	2011 WM_{101}	—	November 27, 2011	Mount Lemmon	Mount Lemmon Survey	MAR	820 m	MPC · JPL
763231	2011 WE_{104}	—	November 3, 2011	Mount Lemmon	Mount Lemmon Survey	KON	1.9 km	MPC · JPL
763232	2011 WT_{108}	—	September 24, 2011	Mount Lemmon	Mount Lemmon Survey	·	1.1 km	MPC · JPL
763233	2011 WU_{112}	—	October 25, 2011	Haleakala	Pan-STARRS 1	·	1.2 km	MPC · JPL
763234	2011 WV_{112}	—	November 29, 2011	Kitt Peak	Spacewatch	HNS	1.0 km	MPC · JPL
763235	2011 WZ_{118}	—	December 16, 2007	Kitt Peak	Spacewatch	EUN	960 m	MPC · JPL
763236	2011 WJ_{122}	—	October 24, 2011	Haleakala	Pan-STARRS 1	EOS	1.4 km	MPC · JPL
763237	2011 WH_{123}	—	April 23, 2009	Mount Lemmon	Mount Lemmon Survey	ADE	1.5 km	MPC · JPL
763238	2011 WN_{124}	—	October 25, 2011	Kitt Peak	Spacewatch	·	1.0 km	MPC · JPL
763239	2011 WX_{126}	—	December 31, 2008	Kitt Peak	Spacewatch	·	470 m	MPC · JPL
763240	2011 WJ_{129}	—	October 26, 2011	Haleakala	Pan-STARRS 1	MAS	580 m	MPC · JPL
763241	2011 WQ_{132}	—	November 17, 2011	Mount Lemmon	Mount Lemmon Survey	·	560 m	MPC · JPL
763242	2011 WE_{138}	—	November 2, 2011	Kitt Peak	Spacewatch	EUN	840 m	MPC · JPL
763243	2011 WV_{143}	—	January 15, 2008	Kitt Peak	Spacewatch	·	1.0 km	MPC · JPL
763244	2011 WP_{158}	—	December 31, 2007	Kitt Peak	Spacewatch	·	1.1 km	MPC · JPL
763245	2011 WT_{158}	—	November 25, 2011	Haleakala	Pan-STARRS 1	·	1.8 km	MPC · JPL
763246	2011 WZ_{159}	—	February 8, 2002	Kitt Peak	Spacewatch	LIX	2.6 km	MPC · JPL
763247	2011 WL_{161}	—	July 25, 2014	Haleakala	Pan-STARRS 1	EUN	810 m	MPC · JPL
763248	2011 WU_{161}	—	April 12, 2013	Haleakala	Pan-STARRS 1	·	1.6 km	MPC · JPL
763249	2011 WJ_{162}	—	March 3, 2013	Haleakala	Pan-STARRS 1	·	2.6 km	MPC · JPL
763250	2011 WR_{162}	—	March 27, 2000	Kitt Peak	Spacewatch	·	1.1 km	MPC · JPL
763251	2011 WC_{163}	—	March 6, 2013	Haleakala	Pan-STARRS 1	EUN	880 m	MPC · JPL
763252	2011 WM_{164}	—	November 18, 2011	Mount Lemmon	Mount Lemmon Survey	·	390 m	MPC · JPL
763253	2011 WJ_{166}	—	November 24, 2011	Mount Lemmon	Mount Lemmon Survey	EUN	860 m	MPC · JPL
763254	2011 WY_{166}	—	May 4, 2014	Haleakala	Pan-STARRS 1	·	1.2 km	MPC · JPL
763255	2011 WO_{167}	—	October 10, 2015	Haleakala	Pan-STARRS 1	·	970 m	MPC · JPL
763256	2011 WS_{167}	—	November 18, 2011	Mount Lemmon	Mount Lemmon Survey	·	1.2 km	MPC · JPL
763257	2011 WW_{167}	—	November 17, 2011	Mount Lemmon	Mount Lemmon Survey	·	590 m	MPC · JPL
763258	2011 WD_{168}	—	October 29, 2017	Haleakala	Pan-STARRS 1	·	2.4 km	MPC · JPL
763259	2011 WF_{168}	—	November 20, 2015	Mount Lemmon	Mount Lemmon Survey	·	1.0 km	MPC · JPL
763260	2011 WG_{169}	—	November 30, 2011	Kitt Peak	Spacewatch	ADE	1.5 km	MPC · JPL
763261	2011 WR_{169}	—	November 19, 2017	Haleakala	Pan-STARRS 1	EUP	2.7 km	MPC · JPL
763262	2011 WP_{170}	—	July 25, 2015	Haleakala	Pan-STARRS 1	·	1.6 km	MPC · JPL
763263	2011 WT_{171}	—	April 10, 2014	Haleakala	Pan-STARRS 1	·	1.2 km	MPC · JPL
763264	2011 WL_{172}	—	November 29, 2011	Kitt Peak	Spacewatch	·	420 m	MPC · JPL
763265	2011 WA_{173}	—	February 3, 2013	Haleakala	Pan-STARRS 1	·	1.5 km	MPC · JPL
763266	2011 WD_{173}	—	November 3, 2015	Mount Lemmon	Mount Lemmon Survey	·	1.1 km	MPC · JPL
763267	2011 WF_{173}	—	May 21, 2014	Haleakala	Pan-STARRS 1	·	1.1 km	MPC · JPL
763268	2011 WW_{173}	—	June 4, 2014	Haleakala	Pan-STARRS 1	·	1.3 km	MPC · JPL
763269	2011 WX_{175}	—	November 24, 2011	Mount Lemmon	Mount Lemmon Survey	·	870 m	MPC · JPL
763270	2011 WS_{178}	—	November 23, 2011	Mount Lemmon	Mount Lemmon Survey	·	1.5 km	MPC · JPL
763271	2011 WB_{179}	—	November 17, 2011	Kitt Peak	Spacewatch	·	1.7 km	MPC · JPL
763272	2011 WF_{180}	—	October 9, 2009	Kitt Peak	Spacewatch	L4	6.5 km	MPC · JPL
763273	2011 WH_{180}	—	November 24, 2011	Mount Lemmon	Mount Lemmon Survey	·	2.5 km	MPC · JPL
763274	2011 WP_{183}	—	November 27, 2011	Kitt Peak	Spacewatch	L4	7.9 km	MPC · JPL
763275	2011 WB_{185}	—	November 17, 2011	Kitt Peak	Spacewatch	·	580 m	MPC · JPL
763276	2011 WL_{185}	—	November 30, 2011	Mount Lemmon	Mount Lemmon Survey	·	360 m	MPC · JPL
763277	2011 WT_{185}	—	November 30, 2011	Mount Lemmon	Mount Lemmon Survey	·	480 m	MPC · JPL
763278	2011 WE_{186}	—	November 30, 2011	Kitt Peak	Spacewatch	·	1.3 km	MPC · JPL
763279	2011 WN_{186}	—	November 24, 2011	Haleakala	Pan-STARRS 1	·	1.1 km	MPC · JPL
763280	2011 WO_{188}	—	November 18, 2011	Mount Lemmon	Mount Lemmon Survey	·	1.1 km	MPC · JPL
763281	2011 XT_{4}	—	April 3, 2013	Catalina	CSS	·	1.1 km	MPC · JPL
763282	2011 XZ_{4}	—	December 6, 2011	Haleakala	Pan-STARRS 1	·	1.5 km	MPC · JPL
763283	2011 XC_{5}	—	April 10, 2013	Haleakala	Pan-STARRS 1	·	1.3 km	MPC · JPL
763284	2011 XG_{5}	—	September 12, 2015	Haleakala	Pan-STARRS 1	EUN	940 m	MPC · JPL
763285	2011 XN_{5}	—	May 30, 2014	Mount Lemmon	Mount Lemmon Survey	HNS	1.1 km	MPC · JPL
763286	2011 XE_{6}	—	May 23, 2014	Haleakala	Pan-STARRS 1	·	1.3 km	MPC · JPL
763287	2011 XA_{7}	—	December 1, 2011	Haleakala	Pan-STARRS 1	·	1.4 km	MPC · JPL
763288	2011 YC_{5}	—	November 25, 2011	Haleakala	Pan-STARRS 1	·	2.5 km	MPC · JPL
763289	2011 YD_{10}	—	December 25, 2011	Mount Lemmon	Mount Lemmon Survey	L4	6.6 km	MPC · JPL
763290	2011 YA_{15}	—	December 26, 2011	Mount Lemmon	Mount Lemmon Survey	·	1.8 km	MPC · JPL
763291	2011 YO_{31}	—	November 25, 2011	Haleakala	Pan-STARRS 1	·	1.2 km	MPC · JPL
763292	2011 YJ_{34}	—	December 26, 2011	Kitt Peak	Spacewatch	MRX	770 m	MPC · JPL
763293	2011 YK_{34}	—	November 28, 2011	Mount Lemmon	Mount Lemmon Survey	·	1.1 km	MPC · JPL
763294	2011 YH_{36}	—	December 26, 2011	Kitt Peak	Spacewatch	·	1.2 km	MPC · JPL
763295	2011 YE_{43}	—	March 9, 2003	Kitt Peak	Deep Lens Survey	·	1.5 km	MPC · JPL
763296	2011 YZ_{45}	—	December 27, 2011	Kitt Peak	Spacewatch	·	1.1 km	MPC · JPL
763297	2011 YO_{47}	—	December 2, 2011	ESA OGS	ESA OGS	·	1.8 km	MPC · JPL
763298	2011 YY_{48}	—	December 25, 2011	Mount Lemmon	Mount Lemmon Survey	·	1.1 km	MPC · JPL
763299	2011 YV_{49}	—	October 29, 2006	Mount Lemmon	Mount Lemmon Survey	·	1.7 km	MPC · JPL
763300	2011 YO_{53}	—	December 27, 2011	Mount Lemmon	Mount Lemmon Survey	·	1.0 km	MPC · JPL

== 763301–763400 ==
back to top

Designation			Discovery			Properties		Ref
Permanent	Provisional	Named after	Date	Site	Discoverer(s)	Category	Diam.	Ref
763301	2011 YM_{55}	—	December 29, 2011	Kitt Peak	Spacewatch	·	1.3 km	MPC · JPL
763302	2011 YE_{58}	—	December 25, 2011	Kitt Peak	Spacewatch	·	1.2 km	MPC · JPL
763303	2011 YG_{58}	—	November 26, 2011	Mount Lemmon	Mount Lemmon Survey	·	1.3 km	MPC · JPL
763304	2011 YH_{58}	—	February 28, 2008	Kitt Peak	Spacewatch	·	1.0 km	MPC · JPL
763305	2011 YR_{60}	—	December 29, 2011	Kitt Peak	Spacewatch	·	1.4 km	MPC · JPL
763306	2011 YB_{61}	—	December 29, 2011	Kitt Peak	Spacewatch	·	1.7 km	MPC · JPL
763307	2011 YA_{64}	—	October 22, 2011	Mount Lemmon	Mount Lemmon Survey	·	1.3 km	MPC · JPL
763308	2011 YK_{66}	—	December 31, 2011	Kitt Peak	Spacewatch	·	1.6 km	MPC · JPL
763309	2011 YQ_{76}	—	September 13, 2005	Kitt Peak	Spacewatch	EOS	1.2 km	MPC · JPL
763310	2011 YA_{81}	—	December 28, 2011	Kitt Peak	Spacewatch	·	1.5 km	MPC · JPL
763311	2011 YL_{82}	—	December 29, 2011	Mount Lemmon	Mount Lemmon Survey	·	2.3 km	MPC · JPL
763312	2011 YM_{85}	—	December 18, 2015	Mount Lemmon	Mount Lemmon Survey	·	790 m	MPC · JPL
763313	2011 YO_{85}	—	November 21, 2014	Haleakala	Pan-STARRS 1	·	540 m	MPC · JPL
763314	2011 YX_{86}	—	October 21, 2015	Haleakala	Pan-STARRS 1	·	1.0 km	MPC · JPL
763315	2011 YP_{87}	—	April 2, 2017	Haleakala	Pan-STARRS 1	·	1.1 km	MPC · JPL
763316	2011 YC_{88}	—	March 21, 2017	Haleakala	Pan-STARRS 1	·	820 m	MPC · JPL
763317	2011 YD_{88}	—	February 21, 2017	Haleakala	Pan-STARRS 1	·	1.0 km	MPC · JPL
763318	2011 YX_{88}	—	September 9, 2015	Haleakala	Pan-STARRS 1	·	1.5 km	MPC · JPL
763319	2011 YP_{89}	—	December 26, 2011	Kitt Peak	Spacewatch	·	1.3 km	MPC · JPL
763320	2011 YR_{90}	—	December 29, 2011	Kitt Peak	Spacewatch	H	410 m	MPC · JPL
763321	2011 YZ_{90}	—	December 27, 2011	Mount Lemmon	Mount Lemmon Survey	H	310 m	MPC · JPL
763322	2011 YQ_{91}	—	December 31, 2011	Kitt Peak	Spacewatch	EUN	870 m	MPC · JPL
763323	2011 YG_{92}	—	December 18, 2011	ESA OGS	ESA OGS	L4	7.3 km	MPC · JPL
763324	2011 YH_{94}	—	December 29, 2011	Mount Lemmon	Mount Lemmon Survey	·	1.7 km	MPC · JPL
763325	2011 YX_{95}	—	December 29, 2011	Mount Lemmon	Mount Lemmon Survey	·	540 m	MPC · JPL
763326	2011 YS_{96}	—	December 26, 2011	Kitt Peak	Spacewatch	·	1.2 km	MPC · JPL
763327	2011 YE_{97}	—	December 27, 2011	Mount Lemmon	Mount Lemmon Survey	L4	6.1 km	MPC · JPL
763328	2011 YL_{97}	—	December 29, 2011	Mount Lemmon	Mount Lemmon Survey	L4	6.3 km	MPC · JPL
763329	2011 YY_{97}	—	December 29, 2011	Kitt Peak	Spacewatch	(883)	480 m	MPC · JPL
763330	2011 YL_{98}	—	December 30, 2011	Kitt Peak	Spacewatch	·	1.4 km	MPC · JPL
763331	2011 YM_{98}	—	December 27, 2011	Mount Lemmon	Mount Lemmon Survey	·	1.6 km	MPC · JPL
763332	2011 YC_{100}	—	December 30, 2011	Kitt Peak	Spacewatch	·	1.5 km	MPC · JPL
763333	2012 AT_{5}	—	November 27, 2011	Mount Lemmon	Mount Lemmon Survey	·	1.4 km	MPC · JPL
763334	2012 AV_{12}	—	November 27, 2011	Mount Lemmon	Mount Lemmon Survey	·	1.7 km	MPC · JPL
763335	2012 AM_{18}	—	January 20, 2012	Mount Lemmon	Mount Lemmon Survey	EOS	1.5 km	MPC · JPL
763336	2012 AP_{19}	—	December 31, 2011	Kitt Peak	Spacewatch	·	1.2 km	MPC · JPL
763337	2012 AY_{23}	—	November 26, 2011	Mount Lemmon	Mount Lemmon Survey	·	1.1 km	MPC · JPL
763338	2012 AG_{25}	—	January 3, 2012	Kitt Peak	Spacewatch	·	990 m	MPC · JPL
763339	2012 AM_{25}	—	January 4, 2012	Mount Lemmon	Mount Lemmon Survey	EUN	830 m	MPC · JPL
763340	2012 AG_{27}	—	January 14, 2012	Kitt Peak	Spacewatch	·	1.4 km	MPC · JPL
763341	2012 AZ_{27}	—	July 25, 2014	Haleakala	Pan-STARRS 1	·	1.1 km	MPC · JPL
763342	2012 AG_{29}	—	January 4, 2012	Mount Lemmon	Mount Lemmon Survey	·	1.3 km	MPC · JPL
763343	2012 AR_{29}	—	March 29, 2017	Haleakala	Pan-STARRS 1	·	1.3 km	MPC · JPL
763344	2012 AS_{29}	—	January 2, 2012	Mount Lemmon	Mount Lemmon Survey	·	2.8 km	MPC · JPL
763345	2012 AB_{30}	—	January 1, 2012	Mount Lemmon	Mount Lemmon Survey	·	1.1 km	MPC · JPL
763346	2012 AJ_{30}	—	April 16, 2013	Cerro Tololo-DECam	DECam	·	1.4 km	MPC · JPL
763347	2012 AK_{31}	—	January 7, 1999	Kitt Peak	Spacewatch	·	3.3 km	MPC · JPL
763348	2012 AO_{33}	—	January 2, 2012	Mount Lemmon	Mount Lemmon Survey	JUN	960 m	MPC · JPL
763349	2012 AY_{33}	—	January 1, 2012	Mount Lemmon	Mount Lemmon Survey	·	1.1 km	MPC · JPL
763350	2012 AB_{35}	—	January 14, 2012	Kitt Peak	Spacewatch	·	460 m	MPC · JPL
763351	2012 AD_{36}	—	January 3, 2012	Mount Lemmon	Mount Lemmon Survey	·	2.2 km	MPC · JPL
763352	2012 AH_{36}	—	January 2, 2012	Mount Lemmon	Mount Lemmon Survey	L4	6.6 km	MPC · JPL
763353	2012 AO_{36}	—	January 4, 2012	Mount Lemmon	Mount Lemmon Survey	L4	6.4 km	MPC · JPL
763354	2012 AF_{37}	—	January 1, 2012	Mount Lemmon	Mount Lemmon Survey	·	480 m	MPC · JPL
763355	2012 BP_{5}	—	January 18, 2012	Mount Lemmon	Mount Lemmon Survey	·	540 m	MPC · JPL
763356	2012 BA_{19}	—	January 19, 2012	Haleakala	Pan-STARRS 1	·	480 m	MPC · JPL
763357	2012 BN_{20}	—	January 19, 2012	Mount Lemmon	Mount Lemmon Survey	·	1.2 km	MPC · JPL
763358	2012 BN_{27}	—	March 15, 2004	Kitt Peak	Spacewatch	·	1.4 km	MPC · JPL
763359	2012 BQ_{27}	—	January 31, 2009	Mount Lemmon	Mount Lemmon Survey	·	490 m	MPC · JPL
763360	2012 BN_{35}	—	October 25, 2011	Haleakala	Pan-STARRS 1	JUN	800 m	MPC · JPL
763361	2012 BJ_{36}	—	January 19, 2012	Mount Lemmon	Mount Lemmon Survey	L4	6.1 km	MPC · JPL
763362	2012 BV_{36}	—	January 19, 2012	Mount Lemmon	Mount Lemmon Survey	·	530 m	MPC · JPL
763363	2012 BQ_{44}	—	September 15, 2007	Mount Lemmon	Mount Lemmon Survey	L4	6.5 km	MPC · JPL
763364	2012 BE_{46}	—	January 19, 2012	Mount Lemmon	Mount Lemmon Survey	·	770 m	MPC · JPL
763365	2012 BT_{46}	—	January 19, 2012	Mount Lemmon	Mount Lemmon Survey	L4	6.1 km	MPC · JPL
763366	2012 BB_{48}	—	January 4, 2012	Kitt Peak	Spacewatch	·	1.1 km	MPC · JPL
763367	2012 BD_{50}	—	January 4, 2012	Mount Lemmon	Mount Lemmon Survey	·	1.8 km	MPC · JPL
763368	2012 BR_{51}	—	January 21, 2012	Kitt Peak	Spacewatch	ADE	1.7 km	MPC · JPL
763369	2012 BP_{54}	—	January 21, 2012	Haleakala	Pan-STARRS 1	(1547)	1.2 km	MPC · JPL
763370	2012 BV_{59}	—	January 18, 2012	Mount Lemmon	Mount Lemmon Survey	·	1.0 km	MPC · JPL
763371	2012 BO_{61}	—	January 26, 2012	Haleakala	Pan-STARRS 1	H	400 m	MPC · JPL
763372	2012 BR_{62}	—	January 20, 2012	Mount Lemmon	Mount Lemmon Survey	L4	5.9 km	MPC · JPL
763373	2012 BF_{63}	—	September 29, 2010	Mount Lemmon	Mount Lemmon Survey	·	1.4 km	MPC · JPL
763374	2012 BH_{63}	—	January 20, 2012	Mount Lemmon	Mount Lemmon Survey	L4	5.8 km	MPC · JPL
763375	2012 BB_{65}	—	January 20, 2012	Mount Lemmon	Mount Lemmon Survey	·	1.2 km	MPC · JPL
763376	2012 BD_{69}	—	September 4, 2010	Mount Lemmon	Mount Lemmon Survey	·	1.3 km	MPC · JPL
763377	2012 BH_{72}	—	January 21, 2012	Kitt Peak	Spacewatch	·	1.8 km	MPC · JPL
763378	2012 BF_{78}	—	January 21, 2012	Kitt Peak	Spacewatch	·	460 m	MPC · JPL
763379	2012 BQ_{80}	—	January 27, 2012	Mount Lemmon	Mount Lemmon Survey	·	1.5 km	MPC · JPL
763380	2012 BP_{83}	—	January 27, 2012	Mount Lemmon	Mount Lemmon Survey	·	530 m	MPC · JPL
763381	2012 BT_{89}	—	January 26, 2012	Kitt Peak	Spacewatch	·	1.2 km	MPC · JPL
763382	2012 BN_{92}	—	January 18, 2012	Kitt Peak	Spacewatch	·	1.4 km	MPC · JPL
763383	2012 BZ_{92}	—	September 30, 2006	Mount Lemmon	Mount Lemmon Survey	·	1.0 km	MPC · JPL
763384	2012 BX_{94}	—	January 20, 2012	Kitt Peak	Spacewatch	ADE	1.6 km	MPC · JPL
763385	2012 BH_{104}	—	December 29, 2011	Mount Lemmon	Mount Lemmon Survey	·	900 m	MPC · JPL
763386	2012 BU_{104}	—	January 1, 2012	Piszkés-tető	K. Sárneczky, A. Szing	·	1.8 km	MPC · JPL
763387	2012 BU_{107}	—	September 23, 2008	Kitt Peak	Spacewatch	L4	5.6 km	MPC · JPL
763388	2012 BZ_{112}	—	January 27, 2012	Kitt Peak	Spacewatch	HNS	1.1 km	MPC · JPL
763389	2012 BY_{113}	—	January 27, 2012	Mount Lemmon	Mount Lemmon Survey	GEF	870 m	MPC · JPL
763390	2012 BJ_{114}	—	January 27, 2012	Mount Lemmon	Mount Lemmon Survey	·	1.6 km	MPC · JPL
763391	2012 BY_{114}	—	March 4, 2005	Mount Lemmon	Mount Lemmon Survey	MAS	560 m	MPC · JPL
763392	2012 BW_{115}	—	January 27, 2012	Mount Lemmon	Mount Lemmon Survey	·	1.3 km	MPC · JPL
763393	2012 BX_{118}	—	January 27, 2012	Mount Lemmon	Mount Lemmon Survey	JUN	920 m	MPC · JPL
763394	2012 BA_{120}	—	September 27, 2006	Kitt Peak	Spacewatch	·	1.0 km	MPC · JPL
763395	2012 BO_{121}	—	January 29, 2012	Haleakala	Pan-STARRS 1	HNS	1.0 km	MPC · JPL
763396	2012 BK_{123}	—	January 2, 2012	Mount Lemmon	Mount Lemmon Survey	ADE	1.6 km	MPC · JPL
763397	2012 BV_{125}	—	January 29, 2012	Kitt Peak	Spacewatch	·	460 m	MPC · JPL
763398	2012 BO_{126}	—	January 21, 2012	Haleakala	Pan-STARRS 1	·	1.5 km	MPC · JPL
763399	2012 BC_{128}	—	January 19, 2012	Kitt Peak	Spacewatch	·	1.4 km	MPC · JPL
763400	2012 BG_{129}	—	November 20, 2006	Kitt Peak	Spacewatch	MRX	780 m	MPC · JPL

== 763401–763500 ==
back to top

Designation			Discovery			Properties		Ref
Permanent	Provisional	Named after	Date	Site	Discoverer(s)	Category	Diam.	Ref
763401	2012 BK_{135}	—	January 18, 2012	Mount Lemmon	Mount Lemmon Survey	·	630 m	MPC · JPL
763402	2012 BP_{142}	—	January 20, 2012	Mayhill-ISON	L. Elenin	·	2.3 km	MPC · JPL
763403	2012 BA_{148}	—	January 27, 2012	Mount Lemmon	Mount Lemmon Survey	·	1.3 km	MPC · JPL
763404	2012 BK_{148}	—	January 27, 2012	Mount Lemmon	Mount Lemmon Survey	·	800 m	MPC · JPL
763405	2012 BY_{149}	—	January 18, 2012	Kitt Peak	Spacewatch	·	1.5 km	MPC · JPL
763406	2012 BQ_{155}	—	January 19, 2012	Haleakala	Pan-STARRS 1	·	390 m	MPC · JPL
763407	2012 BA_{156}	—	January 18, 2012	Catalina	CSS	·	1.3 km	MPC · JPL
763408	2012 BN_{157}	—	January 17, 2012	Les Engarouines	L. Bernasconi	·	1.5 km	MPC · JPL
763409	2012 BQ_{157}	—	January 19, 2012	Haleakala	Pan-STARRS 1	·	1.4 km	MPC · JPL
763410	2012 BR_{158}	—	January 21, 2012	Kitt Peak	Spacewatch	·	1.3 km	MPC · JPL
763411	2012 BE_{159}	—	January 27, 2012	Kitt Peak	Spacewatch	HNS	1.0 km	MPC · JPL
763412	2012 BF_{159}	—	January 29, 2012	Kitt Peak	Spacewatch	·	1.4 km	MPC · JPL
763413	2012 BX_{160}	—	January 29, 2012	Mount Lemmon	Mount Lemmon Survey	·	2.8 km	MPC · JPL
763414	2012 BZ_{162}	—	January 27, 2012	Mount Lemmon	Mount Lemmon Survey	·	490 m	MPC · JPL
763415	2012 BZ_{163}	—	January 27, 2012	Mount Lemmon	Mount Lemmon Survey	·	1.8 km	MPC · JPL
763416	2012 BO_{164}	—	January 30, 2012	Mount Lemmon	Mount Lemmon Survey	·	1.3 km	MPC · JPL
763417	2012 BP_{165}	—	January 19, 2012	Haleakala	Pan-STARRS 1	·	960 m	MPC · JPL
763418	2012 BT_{165}	—	January 20, 2012	Haleakala	Pan-STARRS 1	JUN	760 m	MPC · JPL
763419	2012 BW_{166}	—	January 26, 2012	Mount Lemmon	Mount Lemmon Survey	·	1.5 km	MPC · JPL
763420	2012 BF_{167}	—	January 31, 2012	Mount Lemmon	Mount Lemmon Survey	ADE	1.6 km	MPC · JPL
763421	2012 BN_{167}	—	August 28, 2014	Haleakala	Pan-STARRS 1	·	1.4 km	MPC · JPL
763422	2012 BZ_{167}	—	January 27, 2012	Mount Lemmon	Mount Lemmon Survey	MAR	780 m	MPC · JPL
763423	2012 BA_{168}	—	January 27, 2012	Mount Lemmon	Mount Lemmon Survey	·	1.2 km	MPC · JPL
763424	2012 BB_{168}	—	January 20, 2012	Mount Lemmon	Mount Lemmon Survey	·	1.5 km	MPC · JPL
763425	2012 BK_{168}	—	January 26, 2012	Kitt Peak	Spacewatch	·	1.4 km	MPC · JPL
763426	2012 BP_{168}	—	January 27, 2012	Mount Lemmon	Mount Lemmon Survey	·	1.3 km	MPC · JPL
763427	2012 BR_{168}	—	January 25, 2012	Haleakala	Pan-STARRS 1	JUN	800 m	MPC · JPL
763428	2012 BS_{169}	—	March 29, 2017	Haleakala	Pan-STARRS 1	·	1.4 km	MPC · JPL
763429	2012 BV_{169}	—	January 21, 2012	Kitt Peak	Spacewatch	·	420 m	MPC · JPL
763430	2012 BF_{171}	—	January 26, 2012	Mount Lemmon	Mount Lemmon Survey	·	1.3 km	MPC · JPL
763431	2012 BN_{171}	—	April 6, 2017	Haleakala	Pan-STARRS 1	·	1.1 km	MPC · JPL
763432	2012 BM_{172}	—	January 26, 2012	Haleakala	Pan-STARRS 1	·	1.2 km	MPC · JPL
763433	2012 BY_{172}	—	April 27, 2017	Haleakala	Pan-STARRS 1	·	1.0 km	MPC · JPL
763434	2012 BA_{173}	—	April 6, 2017	Haleakala	Pan-STARRS 1	·	1.4 km	MPC · JPL
763435	2012 BK_{174}	—	January 19, 2012	Haleakala	Pan-STARRS 1	·	1.2 km	MPC · JPL
763436	2012 BQ_{174}	—	January 19, 2012	Haleakala	Pan-STARRS 1	·	490 m	MPC · JPL
763437	2012 BE_{175}	—	January 26, 2012	Mount Lemmon	Mount Lemmon Survey	·	470 m	MPC · JPL
763438	2012 BC_{176}	—	January 20, 2012	Haleakala	Pan-STARRS 1	H	320 m	MPC · JPL
763439	2012 BL_{178}	—	January 19, 2012	Haleakala	Pan-STARRS 1	·	1.1 km	MPC · JPL
763440	2012 BM_{180}	—	January 26, 2012	Mount Lemmon	Mount Lemmon Survey	L4	6.4 km	MPC · JPL
763441	2012 BH_{181}	—	January 20, 2012	Mount Lemmon	Mount Lemmon Survey	·	1.8 km	MPC · JPL
763442	2012 BM_{181}	—	January 18, 2012	Kitt Peak	Spacewatch	·	1.2 km	MPC · JPL
763443	2012 BS_{183}	—	January 21, 2012	Kitt Peak	Spacewatch	EUN	860 m	MPC · JPL
763444	2012 BC_{185}	—	January 19, 2012	Haleakala	Pan-STARRS 1	·	1.2 km	MPC · JPL
763445	2012 BB_{186}	—	January 27, 2012	Mount Lemmon	Mount Lemmon Survey	·	1.3 km	MPC · JPL
763446	2012 BN_{186}	—	January 26, 2012	Mount Lemmon	Mount Lemmon Survey	·	1.4 km	MPC · JPL
763447	2012 BM_{187}	—	January 18, 2012	Mount Lemmon	Mount Lemmon Survey	·	1.3 km	MPC · JPL
763448	2012 CU_{9}	—	February 3, 2012	Haleakala	Pan-STARRS 1	·	430 m	MPC · JPL
763449	2012 CJ_{14}	—	January 21, 2012	Kitt Peak	Spacewatch	DOR	1.7 km	MPC · JPL
763450	2012 CS_{26}	—	February 11, 2012	Mount Lemmon	Mount Lemmon Survey	·	1.6 km	MPC · JPL
763451	2012 CT_{31}	—	February 14, 2012	Haleakala	Pan-STARRS 1	·	1.5 km	MPC · JPL
763452	2012 CM_{36}	—	November 13, 2010	Mount Lemmon	Mount Lemmon Survey	T_{j} (2.8) · unusual	5.0 km	MPC · JPL
763453	2012 CA_{39}	—	January 21, 2012	Kitt Peak	Spacewatch	·	1.3 km	MPC · JPL
763454	2012 CP_{42}	—	January 19, 2012	Haleakala	Pan-STARRS 1	·	1.1 km	MPC · JPL
763455	2012 CD_{48}	—	February 1, 2012	Mount Lemmon	Mount Lemmon Survey	·	510 m	MPC · JPL
763456	2012 CO_{49}	—	January 30, 2012	Mount Lemmon	Mount Lemmon Survey	·	500 m	MPC · JPL
763457	2012 CN_{55}	—	April 1, 2008	Mount Lemmon	Mount Lemmon Survey	DOR	2.0 km	MPC · JPL
763458	2012 CO_{60}	—	February 11, 2012	Mount Lemmon	Mount Lemmon Survey	·	1.4 km	MPC · JPL
763459	2012 CR_{60}	—	February 3, 2012	Haleakala	Pan-STARRS 1	·	520 m	MPC · JPL
763460	2012 CH_{61}	—	May 15, 2013	Kitt Peak	Spacewatch	EUN	1.0 km	MPC · JPL
763461	2012 CK_{63}	—	July 5, 2016	Mount Lemmon	Mount Lemmon Survey	·	640 m	MPC · JPL
763462	2012 CN_{63}	—	December 3, 2015	Haleakala	Pan-STARRS 1	·	1.8 km	MPC · JPL
763463	2012 CS_{63}	—	July 30, 2014	Haleakala	Pan-STARRS 1	·	1.3 km	MPC · JPL
763464	2012 CG_{64}	—	November 22, 2014	Haleakala	Pan-STARRS 1	·	530 m	MPC · JPL
763465	2012 CY_{64}	—	October 27, 2017	Haleakala	Pan-STARRS 1	·	490 m	MPC · JPL
763466	2012 CF_{65}	—	February 3, 2012	Haleakala	Pan-STARRS 1	·	1.2 km	MPC · JPL
763467	2012 CK_{65}	—	February 2, 2012	Kitt Peak	Spacewatch	NYS	900 m	MPC · JPL
763468	2012 CZ_{65}	—	July 30, 2014	Haleakala	Pan-STARRS 1	·	1.5 km	MPC · JPL
763469	2012 CG_{66}	—	February 3, 2012	Haleakala	Pan-STARRS 1	·	1.7 km	MPC · JPL
763470	2012 CU_{66}	—	February 15, 2012	Haleakala	Pan-STARRS 1	·	1.5 km	MPC · JPL
763471	2012 CF_{67}	—	February 1, 2012	Mount Lemmon	Mount Lemmon Survey	·	440 m	MPC · JPL
763472	2012 CH_{69}	—	February 3, 2012	Haleakala	Pan-STARRS 1	·	1.3 km	MPC · JPL
763473	2012 CS_{69}	—	February 3, 2012	Haleakala	Pan-STARRS 1	·	480 m	MPC · JPL
763474	2012 CY_{69}	—	February 13, 2012	Haleakala	Pan-STARRS 1	NEM	1.6 km	MPC · JPL
763475	2012 CN_{70}	—	February 3, 2012	Haleakala	Pan-STARRS 1	·	870 m	MPC · JPL
763476	2012 CC_{72}	—	February 1, 2012	Mount Lemmon	Mount Lemmon Survey	EOS	1.4 km	MPC · JPL
763477	2012 CQ_{73}	—	February 3, 2012	Mount Lemmon	Mount Lemmon Survey	EOS	1.5 km	MPC · JPL
763478	2012 DS_{2}	—	February 16, 2012	Haleakala	Pan-STARRS 1	·	480 m	MPC · JPL
763479	2012 DR_{12}	—	January 18, 2012	Catalina	CSS	JUN	690 m	MPC · JPL
763480	2012 DU_{16}	—	February 16, 2012	Haleakala	Pan-STARRS 1	·	1.8 km	MPC · JPL
763481	2012 DJ_{18}	—	February 1, 2012	Mount Lemmon	Mount Lemmon Survey	·	2.6 km	MPC · JPL
763482	2012 DK_{24}	—	February 3, 2012	Mount Lemmon	Mount Lemmon Survey	·	1.5 km	MPC · JPL
763483	2012 DM_{28}	—	February 22, 2012	Kitt Peak	Spacewatch	·	1.2 km	MPC · JPL
763484	2012 DH_{29}	—	February 22, 2012	Kitt Peak	Spacewatch	·	560 m	MPC · JPL
763485	2012 DF_{36}	—	January 20, 2012	Haleakala	Pan-STARRS 1	JUN	880 m	MPC · JPL
763486	2012 DD_{37}	—	February 25, 2012	Kitt Peak	Spacewatch	·	710 m	MPC · JPL
763487	2012 DO_{50}	—	February 22, 2012	Kitt Peak	Spacewatch	·	530 m	MPC · JPL
763488 Oniciuc	2012 DZ_{51}	Oniciuc	February 26, 2012	Roque de los Muchachos	EURONEAR	·	1.4 km	MPC · JPL
763489	2012 DJ_{55}	—	January 30, 2012	Kitt Peak	Spacewatch	·	1.2 km	MPC · JPL
763490	2012 DM_{56}	—	February 25, 2012	Mount Lemmon	Mount Lemmon Survey	·	1.5 km	MPC · JPL
763491	2012 DO_{63}	—	January 27, 2012	Mount Lemmon	Mount Lemmon Survey	·	1.7 km	MPC · JPL
763492	2012 DE_{65}	—	February 21, 2007	Kitt Peak	Spacewatch	·	1.6 km	MPC · JPL
763493	2012 DL_{65}	—	January 20, 2008	Kitt Peak	Spacewatch	·	910 m	MPC · JPL
763494	2012 DL_{68}	—	February 25, 2012	Mount Lemmon	Mount Lemmon Survey	·	490 m	MPC · JPL
763495	2012 DM_{69}	—	January 27, 2012	Kitt Peak	Spacewatch	·	1.9 km	MPC · JPL
763496	2012 DT_{71}	—	January 19, 2012	Haleakala	Pan-STARRS 1	·	1.5 km	MPC · JPL
763497	2012 DY_{74}	—	February 23, 2012	Mount Lemmon	Mount Lemmon Survey	·	550 m	MPC · JPL
763498	2012 DG_{80}	—	September 14, 2007	Mount Lemmon	Mount Lemmon Survey	·	490 m	MPC · JPL
763499	2012 DW_{93}	—	February 3, 2012	Haleakala	Pan-STARRS 1	DOR	1.3 km	MPC · JPL
763500	2012 DY_{93}	—	October 1, 2003	Kitt Peak	Spacewatch	MAS	620 m	MPC · JPL

== 763501–763600 ==
back to top

Designation			Discovery			Properties		Ref
Permanent	Provisional	Named after	Date	Site	Discoverer(s)	Category	Diam.	Ref
763501	2012 DD_{100}	—	February 23, 2012	Kitt Peak	Spacewatch	·	1.6 km	MPC · JPL
763502	2012 DS_{100}	—	October 10, 2010	Mount Lemmon	Mount Lemmon Survey	·	510 m	MPC · JPL
763503	2012 DY_{101}	—	August 27, 2009	Kitt Peak	Spacewatch	·	1.4 km	MPC · JPL
763504	2012 DE_{104}	—	February 27, 2012	Haleakala	Pan-STARRS 1	·	780 m	MPC · JPL
763505	2012 DZ_{104}	—	February 28, 2012	Haleakala	Pan-STARRS 1	·	1.2 km	MPC · JPL
763506	2012 DH_{107}	—	February 25, 2012	Kitt Peak	Spacewatch	·	460 m	MPC · JPL
763507	2012 DO_{107}	—	February 25, 2012	Mount Lemmon	Mount Lemmon Survey	BRA	1 km	MPC · JPL
763508	2012 DX_{107}	—	February 26, 2012	Haleakala	Pan-STARRS 1	·	1.6 km	MPC · JPL
763509	2012 DR_{111}	—	February 21, 2012	Mount Lemmon	Mount Lemmon Survey	·	600 m	MPC · JPL
763510	2012 DB_{112}	—	February 26, 2012	Mount Lemmon	Mount Lemmon Survey	·	550 m	MPC · JPL
763511	2012 DF_{112}	—	July 25, 2014	ESA OGS	ESA OGS	·	1.7 km	MPC · JPL
763512	2012 DS_{112}	—	January 27, 2017	Haleakala	Pan-STARRS 1	THM	2.2 km	MPC · JPL
763513	2012 DE_{113}	—	February 16, 2012	Haleakala	Pan-STARRS 1	·	430 m	MPC · JPL
763514	2012 DF_{115}	—	August 22, 2014	Haleakala	Pan-STARRS 1	·	1.4 km	MPC · JPL
763515	2012 DY_{115}	—	June 15, 2018	Haleakala	Pan-STARRS 1	·	1.3 km	MPC · JPL
763516	2012 DN_{116}	—	February 19, 2012	Kitt Peak	Spacewatch	·	2.0 km	MPC · JPL
763517	2012 DP_{116}	—	February 27, 2012	Haleakala	Pan-STARRS 1	·	630 m	MPC · JPL
763518	2012 DO_{117}	—	February 21, 2012	Kitt Peak	Spacewatch	H	390 m	MPC · JPL
763519	2012 DW_{117}	—	February 25, 2012	Mount Lemmon	Mount Lemmon Survey	·	1.4 km	MPC · JPL
763520	2012 DY_{118}	—	February 27, 2012	Haleakala	Pan-STARRS 1	·	1.6 km	MPC · JPL
763521	2012 DB_{119}	—	February 27, 2012	Haleakala	Pan-STARRS 1	·	850 m	MPC · JPL
763522	2012 DW_{120}	—	January 19, 2012	Mount Lemmon	Mount Lemmon Survey	·	1.4 km	MPC · JPL
763523	2012 DO_{122}	—	February 23, 2012	Mount Lemmon	Mount Lemmon Survey	·	540 m	MPC · JPL
763524	2012 DU_{122}	—	February 16, 2012	Mayhill-ISON	L. Elenin	·	1.5 km	MPC · JPL
763525	2012 DY_{122}	—	February 27, 2012	Haleakala	Pan-STARRS 1	·	2.1 km	MPC · JPL
763526	2012 DH_{123}	—	February 24, 2012	Haleakala	Pan-STARRS 1	·	1.3 km	MPC · JPL
763527	2012 DJ_{124}	—	February 27, 2012	Haleakala	Pan-STARRS 1	AEO	890 m	MPC · JPL
763528	2012 DQ_{125}	—	February 27, 2012	Haleakala	Pan-STARRS 1	EOS	1.1 km	MPC · JPL
763529	2012 DE_{128}	—	February 27, 2012	Kitt Peak	Spacewatch	·	510 m	MPC · JPL
763530	2012 DV_{128}	—	February 27, 2012	Haleakala	Pan-STARRS 1	·	520 m	MPC · JPL
763531	2012 DH_{129}	—	February 28, 2012	Haleakala	Pan-STARRS 1	·	1.9 km	MPC · JPL
763532	2012 DM_{133}	—	February 28, 2012	Haleakala	Pan-STARRS 1	WIT	780 m	MPC · JPL
763533 Alabiano	2012 EN_{6}	Alabiano	February 21, 2012	Mount Graham	K. Černis, R. P. Boyle	·	500 m	MPC · JPL
763534	2012 EJ_{16}	—	March 14, 2012	Palomar	Palomar Transient Factory	·	960 m	MPC · JPL
763535	2012 ET_{19}	—	March 14, 2012	Mount Lemmon	Mount Lemmon Survey	·	1.6 km	MPC · JPL
763536	2012 EZ_{20}	—	March 14, 2012	Mount Lemmon	Mount Lemmon Survey	·	880 m	MPC · JPL
763537	2012 EJ_{21}	—	September 19, 2014	Haleakala	Pan-STARRS 1	·	1.7 km	MPC · JPL
763538	2012 ES_{22}	—	March 15, 2012	Mount Lemmon	Mount Lemmon Survey	·	600 m	MPC · JPL
763539	2012 EA_{23}	—	March 2, 2012	Kitt Peak	Spacewatch	·	580 m	MPC · JPL
763540	2012 ES_{25}	—	March 1, 2012	Mount Lemmon	Mount Lemmon Survey	·	840 m	MPC · JPL
763541	2012 EK_{26}	—	March 4, 2012	Mount Lemmon	Mount Lemmon Survey	·	1.2 km	MPC · JPL
763542	2012 EU_{26}	—	March 15, 2012	Mount Lemmon	Mount Lemmon Survey	·	500 m	MPC · JPL
763543	2012 ED_{28}	—	March 14, 2012	Mount Lemmon	Mount Lemmon Survey	·	2.3 km	MPC · JPL
763544	2012 EH_{29}	—	March 13, 2012	Mount Lemmon	Mount Lemmon Survey	·	1.3 km	MPC · JPL
763545	2012 EM_{32}	—	March 13, 2012	Mount Lemmon	Mount Lemmon Survey	·	1.5 km	MPC · JPL
763546	2012 FA_{2}	—	January 19, 2012	Haleakala	Pan-STARRS 1	·	1.6 km	MPC · JPL
763547	2012 FO_{3}	—	March 15, 2012	Mount Lemmon	Mount Lemmon Survey	DOR	1.5 km	MPC · JPL
763548	2012 FP_{3}	—	March 16, 2012	Haleakala	Pan-STARRS 1	·	1.5 km	MPC · JPL
763549	2012 FR_{3}	—	February 23, 2012	Catalina	CSS	·	1.2 km	MPC · JPL
763550	2012 FC_{19}	—	March 13, 2012	Mount Lemmon	Mount Lemmon Survey	·	1.0 km	MPC · JPL
763551	2012 FO_{19}	—	March 17, 2012	Mount Lemmon	Mount Lemmon Survey	·	480 m	MPC · JPL
763552	2012 FN_{21}	—	March 17, 2012	Mount Lemmon	Mount Lemmon Survey	·	1.4 km	MPC · JPL
763553	2012 FP_{26}	—	October 16, 2009	Mount Lemmon	Mount Lemmon Survey	EOS	1.3 km	MPC · JPL
763554	2012 FT_{38}	—	March 15, 2012	Mount Lemmon	Mount Lemmon Survey	·	520 m	MPC · JPL
763555	2012 FC_{41}	—	February 26, 2007	Mount Lemmon	Mount Lemmon Survey	KOR	1.1 km	MPC · JPL
763556	2012 FY_{42}	—	March 25, 2012	Mount Lemmon	Mount Lemmon Survey	·	1.4 km	MPC · JPL
763557	2012 FB_{47}	—	December 7, 2005	Kitt Peak	Spacewatch	·	1.2 km	MPC · JPL
763558	2012 FC_{47}	—	February 28, 2012	Haleakala	Pan-STARRS 1	·	1.4 km	MPC · JPL
763559	2012 FD_{51}	—	March 24, 2012	Mount Lemmon	Mount Lemmon Survey	·	800 m	MPC · JPL
763560	2012 FT_{64}	—	March 15, 2012	Kitt Peak	Spacewatch	·	1.5 km	MPC · JPL
763561	2012 FV_{68}	—	March 16, 2012	Mount Lemmon	Mount Lemmon Survey	EOS	1.4 km	MPC · JPL
763562	2012 FO_{75}	—	March 16, 2012	Haleakala	Pan-STARRS 1	·	2.9 km	MPC · JPL
763563	2012 FB_{86}	—	March 24, 2012	Kitt Peak	Spacewatch	·	1.7 km	MPC · JPL
763564	2012 FL_{86}	—	March 28, 2012	Mount Lemmon	Mount Lemmon Survey	·	1.8 km	MPC · JPL
763565	2012 FK_{87}	—	March 24, 2012	Kitt Peak	Spacewatch	·	460 m	MPC · JPL
763566	2012 FK_{88}	—	March 29, 2012	Mount Lemmon	Mount Lemmon Survey	·	950 m	MPC · JPL
763567	2012 FS_{88}	—	March 17, 2012	Mount Lemmon	Mount Lemmon Survey	MAS	570 m	MPC · JPL
763568	2012 FU_{88}	—	March 23, 2012	Mount Lemmon	Mount Lemmon Survey	·	490 m	MPC · JPL
763569	2012 FV_{88}	—	January 23, 2006	Kitt Peak	Spacewatch	·	1.9 km	MPC · JPL
763570	2012 FB_{89}	—	March 24, 2012	Kitt Peak	Spacewatch	·	2.3 km	MPC · JPL
763571	2012 FD_{89}	—	March 28, 2012	Mount Lemmon	Mount Lemmon Survey	·	520 m	MPC · JPL
763572	2012 FB_{90}	—	September 26, 1995	Kitt Peak	Spacewatch	·	740 m	MPC · JPL
763573	2012 FQ_{90}	—	March 27, 2012	Mount Lemmon	Mount Lemmon Survey	·	1.6 km	MPC · JPL
763574	2012 FE_{91}	—	March 20, 2012	Haleakala	Pan-STARRS 1	DOR	2.0 km	MPC · JPL
763575	2012 FT_{91}	—	December 7, 2015	Haleakala	Pan-STARRS 1	·	1.5 km	MPC · JPL
763576	2012 FJ_{92}	—	March 31, 2012	Mount Lemmon	Mount Lemmon Survey	·	1.2 km	MPC · JPL
763577	2012 FT_{93}	—	March 22, 2012	Mount Lemmon	Mount Lemmon Survey	·	470 m	MPC · JPL
763578	2012 FD_{94}	—	March 24, 2012	Mount Lemmon	Mount Lemmon Survey	·	1.7 km	MPC · JPL
763579	2012 FH_{94}	—	January 19, 2015	Haleakala	Pan-STARRS 1	·	560 m	MPC · JPL
763580	2012 FO_{94}	—	July 4, 2016	Haleakala	Pan-STARRS 1	·	500 m	MPC · JPL
763581	2012 FQ_{94}	—	March 28, 2012	Mount Lemmon	Mount Lemmon Survey	·	1.6 km	MPC · JPL
763582	2012 FM_{95}	—	March 29, 2012	Kitt Peak	Spacewatch	·	1.7 km	MPC · JPL
763583	2012 FO_{96}	—	March 21, 2012	Mount Lemmon	Mount Lemmon Survey	·	500 m	MPC · JPL
763584	2012 FX_{96}	—	July 9, 2016	Kitt Peak	Spacewatch	·	620 m	MPC · JPL
763585	2012 FS_{97}	—	October 25, 2014	Mount Lemmon	Mount Lemmon Survey	·	1.6 km	MPC · JPL
763586	2012 FY_{97}	—	August 14, 2013	Haleakala	Pan-STARRS 1	·	450 m	MPC · JPL
763587	2012 FF_{98}	—	March 29, 2012	Haleakala	Pan-STARRS 1	·	1.3 km	MPC · JPL
763588	2012 FK_{98}	—	March 20, 2017	Haleakala	Pan-STARRS 1	·	1.4 km	MPC · JPL
763589	2012 FR_{98}	—	March 28, 2012	Mount Lemmon	Mount Lemmon Survey	·	1.3 km	MPC · JPL
763590	2012 FW_{98}	—	March 24, 2012	Mount Lemmon	Mount Lemmon Survey	·	1.6 km	MPC · JPL
763591	2012 FA_{99}	—	January 21, 2002	Kitt Peak	Spacewatch	·	1.3 km	MPC · JPL
763592	2012 FL_{99}	—	March 28, 2012	Kitt Peak	Spacewatch	·	880 m	MPC · JPL
763593	2012 FO_{99}	—	March 30, 2012	Mount Lemmon	Mount Lemmon Survey	·	1.5 km	MPC · JPL
763594	2012 FP_{99}	—	March 28, 2012	Mount Lemmon	Mount Lemmon Survey	·	1.3 km	MPC · JPL
763595	2012 FF_{100}	—	March 25, 2012	Mount Lemmon	Mount Lemmon Survey	·	470 m	MPC · JPL
763596	2012 FU_{100}	—	March 16, 2012	Mount Lemmon	Mount Lemmon Survey	·	1.1 km	MPC · JPL
763597	2012 FS_{101}	—	March 27, 2012	Kitt Peak	Spacewatch	MAS	590 m	MPC · JPL
763598	2012 FY_{101}	—	May 25, 2003	Kitt Peak	Spacewatch	·	1.7 km	MPC · JPL
763599	2012 FH_{102}	—	March 16, 2012	Mount Lemmon	Mount Lemmon Survey	AEO	850 m	MPC · JPL
763600	2012 FK_{105}	—	March 29, 2012	Haleakala	Pan-STARRS 1	·	1.8 km	MPC · JPL

== 763601–763700 ==
back to top

Designation			Discovery			Properties		Ref
Permanent	Provisional	Named after	Date	Site	Discoverer(s)	Category	Diam.	Ref
763601	2012 FE_{111}	—	March 28, 2012	Kitt Peak	Spacewatch	·	770 m	MPC · JPL
763602	2012 FX_{112}	—	March 16, 2012	Mount Lemmon	Mount Lemmon Survey	·	1.5 km	MPC · JPL
763603	2012 FA_{113}	—	March 29, 2012	Haleakala	Pan-STARRS 1	·	2.3 km	MPC · JPL
763604	2012 FB_{113}	—	March 29, 2012	Haleakala	Pan-STARRS 1	·	2.0 km	MPC · JPL
763605	2012 FH_{114}	—	March 22, 2012	Mount Lemmon	Mount Lemmon Survey	·	1.5 km	MPC · JPL
763606	2012 GF_{3}	—	April 11, 2012	Mount Lemmon	Mount Lemmon Survey	·	1.4 km	MPC · JPL
763607	2012 GO_{3}	—	March 27, 2012	Kitt Peak	Spacewatch	·	930 m	MPC · JPL
763608	2012 GQ_{4}	—	March 10, 2005	Mount Lemmon	Mount Lemmon Survey	·	490 m	MPC · JPL
763609	2012 GD_{6}	—	March 23, 2012	Mount Lemmon	Mount Lemmon Survey	·	1.5 km	MPC · JPL
763610	2012 GO_{9}	—	April 13, 2012	Haleakala	Pan-STARRS 1	·	2.4 km	MPC · JPL
763611	2012 GF_{10}	—	March 1, 2012	Mount Lemmon	Mount Lemmon Survey	·	1.3 km	MPC · JPL
763612	2012 GP_{19}	—	October 24, 2009	Kitt Peak	Spacewatch	·	2.5 km	MPC · JPL
763613	2012 GQ_{20}	—	May 10, 2003	Kitt Peak	Spacewatch	DOR	1.9 km	MPC · JPL
763614	2012 GY_{32}	—	March 28, 2012	Kitt Peak	Spacewatch	MAS	560 m	MPC · JPL
763615	2012 GO_{33}	—	April 13, 2012	Haleakala	Pan-STARRS 1	·	1.7 km	MPC · JPL
763616	2012 GX_{34}	—	March 17, 2012	Kitt Peak	Spacewatch	·	1.2 km	MPC · JPL
763617	2012 GL_{36}	—	March 16, 2012	Kitt Peak	Spacewatch	·	1.9 km	MPC · JPL
763618	2012 GX_{39}	—	March 16, 2012	Kitt Peak	Spacewatch	·	1.7 km	MPC · JPL
763619	2012 GV_{41}	—	August 29, 2009	Kitt Peak	Spacewatch	·	830 m	MPC · JPL
763620	2012 GC_{42}	—	October 3, 2013	Haleakala	Pan-STARRS 1	·	570 m	MPC · JPL
763621	2012 GM_{42}	—	January 22, 2015	Haleakala	Pan-STARRS 1	(2076)	580 m	MPC · JPL
763622	2012 GR_{42}	—	August 4, 2013	Haleakala	Pan-STARRS 1	·	1.6 km	MPC · JPL
763623	2012 GK_{43}	—	August 4, 2013	Haleakala	Pan-STARRS 1	·	590 m	MPC · JPL
763624	2012 GN_{43}	—	April 1, 2012	Mount Lemmon	Mount Lemmon Survey	·	1.3 km	MPC · JPL
763625	2012 GM_{44}	—	April 12, 2012	Haleakala	Pan-STARRS 1	·	650 m	MPC · JPL
763626	2012 GQ_{44}	—	April 1, 2012	Haleakala	Pan-STARRS 1	·	2.6 km	MPC · JPL
763627	2012 GT_{44}	—	April 15, 2012	Haleakala	Pan-STARRS 1	·	610 m	MPC · JPL
763628	2012 GX_{44}	—	July 13, 2013	Haleakala	Pan-STARRS 1	·	1.3 km	MPC · JPL
763629	2012 GV_{45}	—	January 24, 2015	Haleakala	Pan-STARRS 1	·	490 m	MPC · JPL
763630	2012 GJ_{46}	—	January 4, 2016	Haleakala	Pan-STARRS 1	EOS	1.3 km	MPC · JPL
763631	2012 GC_{47}	—	January 4, 2016	Haleakala	Pan-STARRS 1	·	1.4 km	MPC · JPL
763632	2012 GP_{47}	—	September 18, 2014	Haleakala	Pan-STARRS 1	·	1.3 km	MPC · JPL
763633	2012 GR_{47}	—	January 13, 2016	Kitt Peak	Spacewatch	·	1.4 km	MPC · JPL
763634	2012 GS_{47}	—	September 19, 1998	Apache Point	SDSS	EOS	1.3 km	MPC · JPL
763635	2012 GU_{47}	—	April 15, 2012	Haleakala	Pan-STARRS 1	KOR	970 m	MPC · JPL
763636	2012 GB_{48}	—	February 9, 2016	Haleakala	Pan-STARRS 1	·	1.7 km	MPC · JPL
763637	2012 GP_{48}	—	April 15, 2012	Haleakala	Pan-STARRS 1	·	1.5 km	MPC · JPL
763638	2012 GT_{50}	—	April 1, 2012	Haleakala	Pan-STARRS 1	·	1.9 km	MPC · JPL
763639	2012 GY_{51}	—	April 15, 2012	Haleakala	Pan-STARRS 1	·	1.3 km	MPC · JPL
763640	2012 GD_{52}	—	April 1, 2012	Haleakala	Pan-STARRS 1	·	940 m	MPC · JPL
763641	2012 HQ_{4}	—	March 16, 2012	Mount Lemmon	Mount Lemmon Survey	·	1.8 km	MPC · JPL
763642	2012 HB_{15}	—	March 27, 2012	Catalina	CSS	·	490 m	MPC · JPL
763643	2012 HD_{21}	—	March 23, 2012	Kitt Peak	Spacewatch	H	440 m	MPC · JPL
763644	2012 HU_{32}	—	April 19, 2012	Kitt Peak	Spacewatch	·	510 m	MPC · JPL
763645	2012 HV_{32}	—	April 27, 2012	Haleakala	Pan-STARRS 1	·	1.9 km	MPC · JPL
763646	2012 HZ_{32}	—	April 27, 2012	Haleakala	Pan-STARRS 1	EOS	1.4 km	MPC · JPL
763647	2012 HL_{38}	—	April 19, 2012	Kitt Peak	Spacewatch	·	700 m	MPC · JPL
763648	2012 HG_{41}	—	April 16, 2012	Haleakala	Pan-STARRS 1	·	1.5 km	MPC · JPL
763649	2012 HK_{43}	—	November 19, 2009	Mount Lemmon	Mount Lemmon Survey	EMA	2.5 km	MPC · JPL
763650	2012 HW_{43}	—	April 19, 2012	Mount Lemmon	Mount Lemmon Survey	·	1.4 km	MPC · JPL
763651	2012 HP_{45}	—	March 28, 2012	Kitt Peak	Spacewatch	·	760 m	MPC · JPL
763652	2012 HE_{48}	—	April 18, 2005	Kitt Peak	Spacewatch	·	560 m	MPC · JPL
763653	2012 HP_{58}	—	March 25, 2012	Kitt Peak	Spacewatch	·	800 m	MPC · JPL
763654	2012 HF_{61}	—	April 19, 2012	Mount Lemmon	Mount Lemmon Survey	MAS	560 m	MPC · JPL
763655	2012 HR_{61}	—	January 2, 2011	Mount Lemmon	Mount Lemmon Survey	·	1.7 km	MPC · JPL
763656	2012 HW_{61}	—	April 20, 2012	Mount Lemmon	Mount Lemmon Survey	·	2.1 km	MPC · JPL
763657	2012 HH_{63}	—	January 31, 2012	Haleakala	Pan-STARRS 1	T_{j} (2.99)	2.7 km	MPC · JPL
763658	2012 HB_{67}	—	April 15, 2012	Haleakala	Pan-STARRS 1	DOR	2.1 km	MPC · JPL
763659	2012 HG_{67}	—	September 20, 2009	Mount Lemmon	Mount Lemmon Survey	·	2.6 km	MPC · JPL
763660	2012 HM_{84}	—	April 20, 2012	Catalina	CSS	·	1.4 km	MPC · JPL
763661	2012 HS_{85}	—	March 26, 2008	Mount Lemmon	Mount Lemmon Survey	NYS	940 m	MPC · JPL
763662	2012 HU_{85}	—	April 20, 2012	Mount Lemmon	Mount Lemmon Survey	·	1.6 km	MPC · JPL
763663	2012 HM_{86}	—	April 20, 2012	Kitt Peak	Spacewatch	·	580 m	MPC · JPL
763664	2012 HV_{86}	—	April 23, 2012	Kitt Peak	Spacewatch	·	850 m	MPC · JPL
763665	2012 HO_{87}	—	August 17, 2009	Kitt Peak	Spacewatch	·	540 m	MPC · JPL
763666	2012 HX_{87}	—	April 24, 2012	Haleakala	Pan-STARRS 1	SDO	177 km	MPC · JPL
763667	2012 HL_{89}	—	April 24, 2012	Haleakala	Pan-STARRS 1	BRA	1.2 km	MPC · JPL
763668	2012 HN_{89}	—	April 21, 2012	Mount Lemmon	Mount Lemmon Survey	EOS	1.6 km	MPC · JPL
763669	2012 HO_{89}	—	April 27, 2012	Mount Lemmon	Mount Lemmon Survey	·	1.9 km	MPC · JPL
763670	2012 HP_{89}	—	August 15, 2013	Haleakala	Pan-STARRS 1	·	930 m	MPC · JPL
763671	2012 HQ_{90}	—	April 27, 2012	Haleakala	Pan-STARRS 1	·	660 m	MPC · JPL
763672	2012 HU_{90}	—	April 27, 2012	Haleakala	Pan-STARRS 1	·	2.6 km	MPC · JPL
763673	2012 HW_{91}	—	April 21, 2012	Mount Lemmon	Mount Lemmon Survey	·	580 m	MPC · JPL
763674	2012 HX_{92}	—	April 27, 2012	Haleakala	Pan-STARRS 1	·	850 m	MPC · JPL
763675	2012 HY_{92}	—	April 29, 2012	Kitt Peak	Spacewatch	·	1.5 km	MPC · JPL
763676	2012 HR_{93}	—	April 27, 2012	Haleakala	Pan-STARRS 1	EOS	1.4 km	MPC · JPL
763677	2012 HV_{93}	—	October 25, 2014	Mount Lemmon	Mount Lemmon Survey	·	1.6 km	MPC · JPL
763678	2012 HW_{94}	—	August 14, 2013	Haleakala	Pan-STARRS 1	·	1.7 km	MPC · JPL
763679	2012 HD_{96}	—	January 22, 2015	Haleakala	Pan-STARRS 1	·	570 m	MPC · JPL
763680	2012 HT_{96}	—	October 20, 2014	Mount Lemmon	Mount Lemmon Survey	·	2.3 km	MPC · JPL
763681	2012 HL_{97}	—	January 30, 2017	Haleakala	Pan-STARRS 1	EOS	1.4 km	MPC · JPL
763682	2012 HQ_{97}	—	October 17, 2014	Mount Lemmon	Mount Lemmon Survey	·	1.6 km	MPC · JPL
763683	2012 HE_{98}	—	April 22, 2012	Kitt Peak	Spacewatch	·	2.3 km	MPC · JPL
763684	2012 HY_{98}	—	April 28, 2012	Kitt Peak	Spacewatch	·	2.8 km	MPC · JPL
763685	2012 HA_{99}	—	April 28, 2012	Kitt Peak	Spacewatch	·	1.9 km	MPC · JPL
763686	2012 HD_{101}	—	April 16, 2012	Haleakala	Pan-STARRS 1	·	920 m	MPC · JPL
763687	2012 HJ_{101}	—	April 27, 2012	Haleakala	Pan-STARRS 1	·	800 m	MPC · JPL
763688	2012 HC_{103}	—	April 30, 2012	Mount Lemmon	Mount Lemmon Survey	·	1.5 km	MPC · JPL
763689	2012 HL_{105}	—	April 29, 2012	Kitt Peak	Spacewatch	GAL	1.0 km	MPC · JPL
763690	2012 HH_{106}	—	April 27, 2012	Haleakala	Pan-STARRS 1	PHO	810 m	MPC · JPL
763691	2012 HV_{106}	—	April 27, 2012	Haleakala	Pan-STARRS 1	·	1.4 km	MPC · JPL
763692	2012 HL_{107}	—	April 20, 2012	Mount Lemmon	Mount Lemmon Survey	·	2.5 km	MPC · JPL
763693	2012 HM_{109}	—	April 28, 2012	Mount Lemmon	Mount Lemmon Survey	·	1.5 km	MPC · JPL
763694	2012 HR_{109}	—	April 27, 2012	Haleakala	Pan-STARRS 1	H	430 m	MPC · JPL
763695	2012 HH_{110}	—	September 30, 2005	Mauna Kea	A. Boattini	·	1.7 km	MPC · JPL
763696	2012 HN_{112}	—	April 29, 2012	Kitt Peak	Spacewatch	·	1.3 km	MPC · JPL
763697	2012 HM_{113}	—	April 27, 2012	Haleakala	Pan-STARRS 1	HOF	2.0 km	MPC · JPL
763698	2012 HG_{114}	—	April 20, 2012	Mount Lemmon	Mount Lemmon Survey	·	1.7 km	MPC · JPL
763699	2012 HL_{116}	—	April 27, 2012	Haleakala	Pan-STARRS 1	·	1.3 km	MPC · JPL
763700	2012 JL_{14}	—	May 15, 2012	Haleakala	Pan-STARRS 1	·	1.5 km	MPC · JPL

== 763701–763800 ==
back to top

Designation			Discovery			Properties		Ref
Permanent	Provisional	Named after	Date	Site	Discoverer(s)	Category	Diam.	Ref
763701	2012 JJ_{15}	—	April 21, 2012	Mount Lemmon	Mount Lemmon Survey	·	1.6 km	MPC · JPL
763702	2012 JT_{16}	—	April 22, 2012	Mount Lemmon	Mount Lemmon Survey	·	540 m	MPC · JPL
763703	2012 JT_{21}	—	June 3, 2005	Kitt Peak	Spacewatch	PHO	690 m	MPC · JPL
763704	2012 JW_{28}	—	April 29, 2012	Kitt Peak	Spacewatch	ELF	3.2 km	MPC · JPL
763705	2012 JZ_{34}	—	May 1, 2012	Mount Lemmon	Mount Lemmon Survey	·	1.4 km	MPC · JPL
763706	2012 JU_{37}	—	May 1, 2012	Mount Lemmon	Mount Lemmon Survey	·	570 m	MPC · JPL
763707	2012 JH_{40}	—	April 22, 2012	Kitt Peak	Spacewatch	·	1.9 km	MPC · JPL
763708	2012 JW_{44}	—	April 27, 2001	Kitt Peak	Spacewatch	NYS	730 m	MPC · JPL
763709	2012 JY_{47}	—	September 9, 2008	Mount Lemmon	Mount Lemmon Survey	·	1.5 km	MPC · JPL
763710	2012 JT_{48}	—	May 1, 2012	Mount Lemmon	Mount Lemmon Survey	V	460 m	MPC · JPL
763711	2012 JO_{49}	—	April 30, 2012	Mount Lemmon	Mount Lemmon Survey	·	1.4 km	MPC · JPL
763712	2012 JM_{52}	—	February 25, 2007	Mount Lemmon	Mount Lemmon Survey	·	1.4 km	MPC · JPL
763713	2012 JL_{53}	—	May 15, 2012	Haleakala	Pan-STARRS 1	·	2.4 km	MPC · JPL
763714	2012 JJ_{58}	—	March 28, 2012	Mount Lemmon	Mount Lemmon Survey	·	820 m	MPC · JPL
763715	2012 JR_{59}	—	May 13, 2012	Mount Lemmon	Mount Lemmon Survey	·	1.4 km	MPC · JPL
763716	2012 JA_{60}	—	November 17, 2009	Kitt Peak	Spacewatch	·	2.1 km	MPC · JPL
763717	2012 JN_{61}	—	May 14, 2012	Mount Lemmon	Mount Lemmon Survey	URS	2.3 km	MPC · JPL
763718	2012 JK_{64}	—	May 15, 2012	Mount Lemmon	Mount Lemmon Survey	·	2.0 km	MPC · JPL
763719	2012 JE_{67}	—	February 27, 2008	Mount Lemmon	Mount Lemmon Survey	·	840 m	MPC · JPL
763720	2012 JP_{68}	—	May 2, 2012	Kitt Peak	Spacewatch	·	1.6 km	MPC · JPL
763721	2012 JY_{68}	—	February 9, 2015	Mount Lemmon	Mount Lemmon Survey	·	600 m	MPC · JPL
763722	2012 JS_{69}	—	May 15, 2012	Mount Lemmon	Mount Lemmon Survey	·	1.5 km	MPC · JPL
763723	2012 JG_{70}	—	May 12, 2012	Mount Lemmon	Mount Lemmon Survey	·	2.7 km	MPC · JPL
763724	2012 JT_{70}	—	May 15, 2012	Mount Lemmon	Mount Lemmon Survey	·	910 m	MPC · JPL
763725	2012 JQ_{72}	—	May 14, 2012	Haleakala	Pan-STARRS 1	·	1.5 km	MPC · JPL
763726	2012 KA_{8}	—	May 19, 2012	Haleakala	Pan-STARRS 1	·	1.6 km	MPC · JPL
763727	2012 KD_{8}	—	May 19, 2012	Haleakala	Pan-STARRS 1	·	1.5 km	MPC · JPL
763728	2012 KE_{13}	—	May 16, 2012	Mount Lemmon	Mount Lemmon Survey	·	1.5 km	MPC · JPL
763729	2012 KW_{17}	—	May 20, 2012	Haleakala	Pan-STARRS 1	·	1.6 km	MPC · JPL
763730	2012 KA_{23}	—	April 27, 2012	Haleakala	Pan-STARRS 1	·	530 m	MPC · JPL
763731	2012 KV_{23}	—	April 30, 2012	Mount Lemmon	Mount Lemmon Survey	·	2.0 km	MPC · JPL
763732	2012 KZ_{23}	—	November 14, 2010	Kitt Peak	Spacewatch	·	1.4 km	MPC · JPL
763733	2012 KH_{25}	—	May 1, 2012	Kitt Peak	Spacewatch	·	760 m	MPC · JPL
763734	2012 KL_{26}	—	May 16, 2012	Mount Lemmon	Mount Lemmon Survey	EOS	1.4 km	MPC · JPL
763735	2012 KW_{26}	—	May 16, 2012	Mount Lemmon	Mount Lemmon Survey	·	1.2 km	MPC · JPL
763736	2012 KY_{27}	—	May 14, 2005	Kitt Peak	Spacewatch	·	520 m	MPC · JPL
763737	2012 KX_{29}	—	May 18, 2012	Haleakala	Pan-STARRS 1	(2076)	630 m	MPC · JPL
763738	2012 KL_{30}	—	May 19, 2012	Mount Lemmon	Mount Lemmon Survey	·	1.3 km	MPC · JPL
763739	2012 KV_{38}	—	April 11, 2003	Kitt Peak	Spacewatch	·	1.3 km	MPC · JPL
763740	2012 KZ_{38}	—	April 20, 2012	Kitt Peak	Spacewatch	·	1.6 km	MPC · JPL
763741	2012 KY_{39}	—	May 19, 2012	Mount Lemmon	Mount Lemmon Survey	·	2.2 km	MPC · JPL
763742	2012 KS_{41}	—	February 25, 2011	Kitt Peak	Spacewatch	EOS	1.5 km	MPC · JPL
763743	2012 KC_{50}	—	May 31, 2012	Mount Lemmon	Mount Lemmon Survey	·	1.9 km	MPC · JPL
763744	2012 KF_{52}	—	April 26, 2017	Haleakala	Pan-STARRS 1	·	1.4 km	MPC · JPL
763745	2012 KN_{53}	—	January 2, 2017	Haleakala	Pan-STARRS 1	H	410 m	MPC · JPL
763746	2012 KT_{53}	—	May 30, 2012	Mount Lemmon	Mount Lemmon Survey	·	2.8 km	MPC · JPL
763747	2012 KW_{53}	—	December 8, 2015	Haleakala	Pan-STARRS 1	·	1.6 km	MPC · JPL
763748	2012 KN_{55}	—	May 30, 2012	Mount Lemmon	Mount Lemmon Survey	·	2.0 km	MPC · JPL
763749	2012 KV_{58}	—	April 1, 2016	Haleakala	Pan-STARRS 1	·	2.6 km	MPC · JPL
763750	2012 KX_{58}	—	December 8, 2015	Haleakala	Pan-STARRS 1	·	1.4 km	MPC · JPL
763751	2012 KY_{58}	—	January 13, 2016	Haleakala	Pan-STARRS 1	EOS	1.5 km	MPC · JPL
763752	2012 KH_{59}	—	May 29, 2012	Mount Lemmon	Mount Lemmon Survey	EOS	1.4 km	MPC · JPL
763753	2012 KB_{61}	—	May 27, 2012	Mount Lemmon	Mount Lemmon Survey	HOF	2.3 km	MPC · JPL
763754	2012 KM_{63}	—	May 16, 2012	Haleakala	Pan-STARRS 1	·	2.7 km	MPC · JPL
763755	2012 KZ_{63}	—	May 21, 2012	Haleakala	Pan-STARRS 1	·	1.0 km	MPC · JPL
763756	2012 KK_{64}	—	May 18, 2012	Haleakala	Pan-STARRS 1	EOS	1.3 km	MPC · JPL
763757	2012 KN_{64}	—	May 16, 2012	Kitt Peak	Spacewatch	·	1.4 km	MPC · JPL
763758	2012 KR_{64}	—	May 16, 2012	Mount Lemmon	Mount Lemmon Survey	·	1.6 km	MPC · JPL
763759	2012 KE_{66}	—	May 19, 2012	Mount Lemmon	Mount Lemmon Survey	EOS	1.4 km	MPC · JPL
763760	2012 LP	—	June 8, 2012	Mount Lemmon	Mount Lemmon Survey	·	1.6 km	MPC · JPL
763761	2012 LZ	—	February 29, 2012	Mount Lemmon	Mount Lemmon Survey	·	2.4 km	MPC · JPL
763762	2012 LF_{8}	—	May 16, 2012	Haleakala	Pan-STARRS 1	·	2.9 km	MPC · JPL
763763	2012 LE_{12}	—	June 14, 2012	Mount Lemmon	Mount Lemmon Survey	PHO	850 m	MPC · JPL
763764	2012 LY_{14}	—	June 12, 2012	Kitt Peak	Spacewatch	·	1.7 km	MPC · JPL
763765	2012 LV_{23}	—	June 14, 2012	Mount Lemmon	Mount Lemmon Survey	·	3.3 km	MPC · JPL
763766	2012 LQ_{27}	—	July 5, 2016	Haleakala	Pan-STARRS 1	PHO	820 m	MPC · JPL
763767	2012 LA_{28}	—	January 23, 2015	Haleakala	Pan-STARRS 1	·	1.1 km	MPC · JPL
763768	2012 LR_{28}	—	August 27, 2016	Haleakala	Pan-STARRS 1	PHO	630 m	MPC · JPL
763769	2012 LA_{29}	—	July 5, 2016	Haleakala	Pan-STARRS 1	·	770 m	MPC · JPL
763770	2012 LR_{29}	—	October 3, 2013	Haleakala	Pan-STARRS 1	HYG	2.0 km	MPC · JPL
763771	2012 LA_{30}	—	February 13, 2016	Mount Lemmon	Mount Lemmon Survey	·	2.3 km	MPC · JPL
763772	2012 LD_{30}	—	March 7, 2016	Haleakala	Pan-STARRS 1	·	1.6 km	MPC · JPL
763773	2012 LF_{30}	—	June 9, 2012	Mount Lemmon	Mount Lemmon Survey	·	1.8 km	MPC · JPL
763774	2012 LK_{30}	—	October 28, 2013	Mount Lemmon	Mount Lemmon Survey	·	2.8 km	MPC · JPL
763775	2012 LV_{30}	—	March 10, 2016	Haleakala	Pan-STARRS 1	EOS	1.4 km	MPC · JPL
763776	2012 LA_{32}	—	June 13, 2012	Haleakala	Pan-STARRS 1	·	2.2 km	MPC · JPL
763777	2012 LB_{32}	—	June 12, 2012	Mount Lemmon	Mount Lemmon Survey	·	1.6 km	MPC · JPL
763778	2012 LN_{32}	—	June 9, 2012	Haleakala	Pan-STARRS 1	H	460 m	MPC · JPL
763779	2012 MG_{2}	—	June 18, 2012	Mount Lemmon	Mount Lemmon Survey	·	2.1 km	MPC · JPL
763780	2012 MD_{5}	—	June 18, 2012	Mount Lemmon	Mount Lemmon Survey	·	1.0 km	MPC · JPL
763781	2012 MZ_{7}	—	June 16, 2012	Haleakala	Pan-STARRS 1	·	3.0 km	MPC · JPL
763782	2012 MA_{13}	—	June 16, 2012	Haleakala	Pan-STARRS 1	·	860 m	MPC · JPL
763783	2012 MH_{13}	—	June 16, 2012	Haleakala	Pan-STARRS 1	·	2.4 km	MPC · JPL
763784	2012 MG_{17}	—	May 15, 2016	Haleakala	Pan-STARRS 1	·	1.3 km	MPC · JPL
763785	2012 MT_{17}	—	June 16, 2012	Haleakala	Pan-STARRS 1	·	2.1 km	MPC · JPL
763786	2012 MZ_{17}	—	October 26, 2013	Mount Lemmon	Mount Lemmon Survey	PHO	660 m	MPC · JPL
763787	2012 MA_{18}	—	October 25, 2013	Mount Lemmon	Mount Lemmon Survey	EOS	1.3 km	MPC · JPL
763788	2012 MX_{18}	—	June 17, 2012	Mount Lemmon	Mount Lemmon Survey	EOS	1.3 km	MPC · JPL
763789	2012 NE_{1}	—	July 29, 2004	Siding Spring	SSS	EUN	1.1 km	MPC · JPL
763790	2012 OZ_{1}	—	July 22, 2012	Alder Springs	K. Levin, N. Teamo	·	2.4 km	MPC · JPL
763791	2012 OR_{6}	—	November 28, 2013	Mount Lemmon	Mount Lemmon Survey	·	1.2 km	MPC · JPL
763792	2012 OW_{6}	—	July 20, 2012	Mayhill-ISON	L. Elenin	·	980 m	MPC · JPL
763793	2012 PR	—	August 7, 2012	Haleakala	Pan-STARRS 1	·	1.1 km	MPC · JPL
763794	2012 PA_{2}	—	August 8, 2012	Haleakala	Pan-STARRS 1	THB	2.2 km	MPC · JPL
763795	2012 PD_{4}	—	August 8, 2012	Haleakala	Pan-STARRS 1	·	2.2 km	MPC · JPL
763796	2012 PZ_{4}	—	August 6, 2012	Haleakala	Pan-STARRS 1	·	1.5 km	MPC · JPL
763797	2012 PU_{9}	—	October 20, 2007	Kitt Peak	Spacewatch	·	2.3 km	MPC · JPL
763798	2012 PZ_{10}	—	August 10, 2012	Kitt Peak	Spacewatch	HYG	1.8 km	MPC · JPL
763799	2012 PN_{13}	—	August 10, 2012	Kitt Peak	Spacewatch	LIX	3.1 km	MPC · JPL
763800	2012 PY_{15}	—	October 8, 2007	Mount Lemmon	Mount Lemmon Survey	·	2.0 km	MPC · JPL

== 763801–763900 ==
back to top

Designation			Discovery			Properties		Ref
Permanent	Provisional	Named after	Date	Site	Discoverer(s)	Category	Diam.	Ref
763801	2012 PL_{21}	—	August 24, 2001	Kitt Peak	Spacewatch	·	2.0 km	MPC · JPL
763802	2012 PA_{27}	—	August 13, 2012	Haleakala	Pan-STARRS 1	3:2	4.3 km	MPC · JPL
763803	2012 PK_{29}	—	August 13, 2012	Haleakala	Pan-STARRS 1	·	2.0 km	MPC · JPL
763804	2012 PU_{36}	—	May 21, 2012	Mount Lemmon	Mount Lemmon Survey	·	2.1 km	MPC · JPL
763805	2012 PW_{38}	—	April 30, 2006	Kitt Peak	Spacewatch	·	1.7 km	MPC · JPL
763806	2012 PU_{44}	—	August 10, 2012	Kitt Peak	Spacewatch	LIX	2.7 km	MPC · JPL
763807	2012 PN_{45}	—	August 14, 2012	Haleakala	Pan-STARRS 1	·	930 m	MPC · JPL
763808	2012 PH_{46}	—	February 27, 2014	Nogales	M. Schwartz, P. R. Holvorcem	H	470 m	MPC · JPL
763809	2012 PK_{47}	—	January 7, 2014	Kitt Peak	Spacewatch	·	840 m	MPC · JPL
763810	2012 PS_{47}	—	August 29, 2016	Mount Lemmon	Mount Lemmon Survey	·	880 m	MPC · JPL
763811	2012 PM_{49}	—	August 14, 2012	Haleakala	Pan-STARRS 1	·	2.3 km	MPC · JPL
763812	2012 PH_{50}	—	August 11, 2012	Siding Spring	SSS	EUP	2.6 km	MPC · JPL
763813	2012 PX_{50}	—	January 15, 2015	Haleakala	Pan-STARRS 1	·	2.1 km	MPC · JPL
763814	2012 PC_{51}	—	February 24, 2015	Haleakala	Pan-STARRS 1	·	1.4 km	MPC · JPL
763815	2012 PC_{52}	—	August 20, 2001	Cerro Tololo	Deep Ecliptic Survey	·	2.2 km	MPC · JPL
763816	2012 PB_{53}	—	December 13, 2013	Mount Lemmon	Mount Lemmon Survey	LIX	2.5 km	MPC · JPL
763817	2012 PY_{54}	—	August 13, 2012	Haleakala	Pan-STARRS 1	VER	2.3 km	MPC · JPL
763818	2012 PJ_{57}	—	August 14, 2012	Kitt Peak	Spacewatch	L5	6.7 km	MPC · JPL
763819	2012 PX_{57}	—	August 14, 2012	Haleakala	Pan-STARRS 1	·	2.4 km	MPC · JPL
763820	2012 PZ_{58}	—	August 13, 2012	Haleakala	Pan-STARRS 1	·	880 m	MPC · JPL
763821	2012 PC_{59}	—	August 10, 2012	Kitt Peak	Spacewatch	·	1.4 km	MPC · JPL
763822	2012 PE_{65}	—	August 13, 2012	Kitt Peak	Spacewatch	L5	6.1 km	MPC · JPL
763823	2012 QN_{1}	—	August 16, 2012	ESA OGS	ESA OGS	·	2.1 km	MPC · JPL
763824	2012 QW_{1}	—	April 10, 2005	Kitt Peak	Deep Ecliptic Survey	·	1.4 km	MPC · JPL
763825	2012 QX_{6}	—	August 17, 2012	Haleakala	Pan-STARRS 1	·	2.2 km	MPC · JPL
763826	2012 QU_{7}	—	August 13, 2012	Haleakala	Pan-STARRS 1	·	1.3 km	MPC · JPL
763827	2012 QO_{9}	—	August 17, 2012	Haleakala	Pan-STARRS 1	EOS	1.5 km	MPC · JPL
763828	2012 QA_{11}	—	August 16, 2012	ESA OGS	ESA OGS	PHO	730 m	MPC · JPL
763829	2012 QH_{11}	—	September 25, 2007	Mount Lemmon	Mount Lemmon Survey	·	1.8 km	MPC · JPL
763830	2012 QN_{11}	—	August 17, 2012	Haleakala	Pan-STARRS 1	·	1.7 km	MPC · JPL
763831	2012 QS_{11}	—	August 17, 2012	Haleakala	Pan-STARRS 1	ARM	2.4 km	MPC · JPL
763832	2012 QG_{13}	—	December 16, 2009	Mount Lemmon	Mount Lemmon Survey	·	960 m	MPC · JPL
763833	2012 QE_{16}	—	August 16, 2012	Haleakala	Pan-STARRS 1	·	2.0 km	MPC · JPL
763834	2012 QG_{18}	—	August 16, 2012	ESA OGS	ESA OGS	·	2.3 km	MPC · JPL
763835	2012 QE_{20}	—	August 22, 2012	Haleakala	Pan-STARRS 1	LIX	2.3 km	MPC · JPL
763836	2012 QP_{21}	—	August 24, 2012	Kitt Peak	Spacewatch	·	1.9 km	MPC · JPL
763837	2012 QW_{21}	—	October 22, 2003	Kitt Peak	Spacewatch	·	1.3 km	MPC · JPL
763838	2012 QO_{24}	—	August 24, 2012	Kitt Peak	Spacewatch	·	2.0 km	MPC · JPL
763839	2012 QX_{30}	—	August 13, 2012	Kitt Peak	Spacewatch	L5	6.1 km	MPC · JPL
763840	2012 QT_{31}	—	August 25, 2012	Kitt Peak	Spacewatch	·	2.0 km	MPC · JPL
763841	2012 QQ_{35}	—	August 25, 2012	Kitt Peak	Spacewatch	·	1.6 km	MPC · JPL
763842	2012 QY_{35}	—	August 25, 2012	Kitt Peak	Spacewatch	·	2.2 km	MPC · JPL
763843	2012 QT_{37}	—	August 25, 2012	Haleakala	Pan-STARRS 1	NYS	970 m	MPC · JPL
763844	2012 QH_{38}	—	August 25, 2012	Haleakala	Pan-STARRS 1	·	2.2 km	MPC · JPL
763845	2012 QU_{49}	—	August 25, 2012	Alder Springs	K. Levin, N. Teamo	·	2.3 km	MPC · JPL
763846	2012 QW_{49}	—	August 13, 2012	Haleakala	Pan-STARRS 1	·	2.6 km	MPC · JPL
763847	2012 QH_{53}	—	August 24, 2012	Kitt Peak	Spacewatch	·	1.2 km	MPC · JPL
763848	2012 QU_{53}	—	August 26, 2012	Haleakala	Pan-STARRS 1	·	2.3 km	MPC · JPL
763849	2012 QD_{55}	—	February 18, 2015	Haleakala	Pan-STARRS 1	·	990 m	MPC · JPL
763850	2012 QF_{56}	—	August 16, 2012	ESA OGS	ESA OGS	·	1.4 km	MPC · JPL
763851	2012 QV_{56}	—	February 26, 2015	Mount Lemmon	Mount Lemmon Survey	·	2.0 km	MPC · JPL
763852	2012 QW_{56}	—	August 26, 2012	Haleakala	Pan-STARRS 1	·	910 m	MPC · JPL
763853	2012 QB_{59}	—	February 15, 2015	Haleakala	Pan-STARRS 1	·	2.6 km	MPC · JPL
763854	2012 QP_{59}	—	November 27, 2013	Haleakala	Pan-STARRS 1	·	1.8 km	MPC · JPL
763855	2012 QT_{59}	—	August 26, 2012	Haleakala	Pan-STARRS 1	·	2.2 km	MPC · JPL
763856	2012 QW_{59}	—	January 18, 2015	Haleakala	Pan-STARRS 1	EOS	1.6 km	MPC · JPL
763857	2012 QA_{60}	—	August 17, 2012	Haleakala	Pan-STARRS 1	·	2.0 km	MPC · JPL
763858	2012 QC_{60}	—	August 25, 2012	Haleakala	Pan-STARRS 1	·	1.6 km	MPC · JPL
763859	2012 QK_{60}	—	August 25, 2012	Haleakala	Pan-STARRS 1	·	2.5 km	MPC · JPL
763860	2012 QL_{61}	—	August 24, 2012	Kitt Peak	Spacewatch	·	2.1 km	MPC · JPL
763861	2012 QA_{62}	—	February 16, 2015	Haleakala	Pan-STARRS 1	NYS	860 m	MPC · JPL
763862	2012 QB_{62}	—	August 26, 2012	Kitt Peak	Spacewatch	·	1.7 km	MPC · JPL
763863	2012 QE_{62}	—	August 26, 2012	Haleakala	Pan-STARRS 1	·	1.4 km	MPC · JPL
763864	2012 QN_{63}	—	February 5, 2016	Haleakala	Pan-STARRS 1	VER	2.1 km	MPC · JPL
763865	2012 QR_{64}	—	August 17, 2012	Haleakala	Pan-STARRS 1	·	1.9 km	MPC · JPL
763866	2012 QX_{64}	—	August 26, 2012	Kitt Peak	Spacewatch	·	1.8 km	MPC · JPL
763867	2012 QF_{65}	—	August 24, 2012	Kitt Peak	Spacewatch	L5	6.5 km	MPC · JPL
763868	2012 QT_{65}	—	August 17, 2012	Haleakala	Pan-STARRS 1	·	840 m	MPC · JPL
763869	2012 QD_{66}	—	August 17, 2012	Haleakala	Pan-STARRS 1	EOS	1.6 km	MPC · JPL
763870	2012 QW_{66}	—	August 26, 2012	Haleakala	Pan-STARRS 1	L5	7.5 km	MPC · JPL
763871	2012 QN_{69}	—	August 17, 2012	Haleakala	Pan-STARRS 1	·	2.2 km	MPC · JPL
763872	2012 QQ_{70}	—	August 18, 2012	ESA OGS	ESA OGS	·	2.2 km	MPC · JPL
763873	2012 QB_{74}	—	August 21, 2012	Westfield	International Astronomical Search Collaboration	·	3.1 km	MPC · JPL
763874	2012 QN_{75}	—	August 17, 2012	Haleakala	Pan-STARRS 1	·	900 m	MPC · JPL
763875	2012 QG_{76}	—	August 26, 2012	Haleakala	Pan-STARRS 1	·	920 m	MPC · JPL
763876	2012 QH_{76}	—	August 17, 2012	Haleakala	Pan-STARRS 1	·	820 m	MPC · JPL
763877	2012 QW_{76}	—	August 26, 2012	Haleakala	Pan-STARRS 1	L5	7.0 km	MPC · JPL
763878	2012 QC_{77}	—	August 25, 2012	Mount Lemmon	Mount Lemmon Survey	·	2.2 km	MPC · JPL
763879	2012 QC_{78}	—	August 26, 2012	Haleakala	Pan-STARRS 1	L5	6.5 km	MPC · JPL
763880	2012 QJ_{79}	—	August 26, 2012	Haleakala	Pan-STARRS 1	·	2.1 km	MPC · JPL
763881	2012 QY_{79}	—	October 12, 2007	Kitt Peak	Spacewatch	VER	2.0 km	MPC · JPL
763882	2012 RG_{2}	—	February 21, 2009	Kitt Peak	Spacewatch	·	2.5 km	MPC · JPL
763883	2012 RG_{4}	—	August 14, 2012	Kitt Peak	Spacewatch	·	940 m	MPC · JPL
763884	2012 RA_{11}	—	October 7, 2007	Catalina	CSS	·	2.3 km	MPC · JPL
763885	2012 RU_{14}	—	September 15, 2012	Mount Lemmon	Mount Lemmon Survey	·	1.7 km	MPC · JPL
763886	2012 RO_{28}	—	August 14, 2012	Haleakala	Pan-STARRS 1	·	2.8 km	MPC · JPL
763887	2012 RY_{41}	—	September 15, 2012	Kitt Peak	Spacewatch	·	2.3 km	MPC · JPL
763888	2012 RH_{44}	—	May 29, 2011	ESA OGS	ESA OGS	·	2.3 km	MPC · JPL
763889	2012 RE_{46}	—	September 10, 2012	Bergisch Gladbach	W. Bickel	·	2.5 km	MPC · JPL
763890	2012 RN_{46}	—	September 15, 2012	Catalina	CSS	·	2.9 km	MPC · JPL
763891	2012 RA_{48}	—	September 13, 2012	Mount Teide	E. Schwab	·	2.3 km	MPC · JPL
763892	2012 RQ_{48}	—	September 10, 2012	Sandlot	G. Hug	·	2.4 km	MPC · JPL
763893	2012 SM	—	September 16, 2012	Wildberg	R. Apitzsch	·	2.3 km	MPC · JPL
763894	2012 SF_{2}	—	August 26, 2012	Haleakala	Pan-STARRS 1	·	2.3 km	MPC · JPL
763895	2012 SS_{8}	—	August 26, 2012	Haleakala	Pan-STARRS 1	·	2.2 km	MPC · JPL
763896	2012 SN_{13}	—	November 20, 2007	Mount Lemmon	Mount Lemmon Survey	EOS	1.4 km	MPC · JPL
763897	2012 SJ_{15}	—	September 17, 2012	Kitt Peak	Spacewatch	·	2.8 km	MPC · JPL
763898	2012 SN_{18}	—	September 17, 2012	Kitt Peak	Spacewatch	·	2.4 km	MPC · JPL
763899	2012 SY_{18}	—	September 17, 2012	Kitt Peak	Spacewatch	·	2.2 km	MPC · JPL
763900	2012 SH_{23}	—	September 17, 2012	Kitt Peak	Spacewatch	·	2.1 km	MPC · JPL

== 763901–764000 ==
back to top

Designation			Discovery			Properties		Ref
Permanent	Provisional	Named after	Date	Site	Discoverer(s)	Category	Diam.	Ref
763901	2012 SK_{24}	—	September 17, 2012	Mount Lemmon	Mount Lemmon Survey	EOS	1.4 km	MPC · JPL
763902	2012 SO_{24}	—	November 3, 2007	Mount Lemmon	Mount Lemmon Survey	·	2.1 km	MPC · JPL
763903	2012 SP_{24}	—	September 17, 2012	Mount Lemmon	Mount Lemmon Survey	·	500 m	MPC · JPL
763904	2012 SU_{31}	—	September 20, 2012	Westfield	International Astronomical Search Collaboration	·	2.5 km	MPC · JPL
763905	2012 SW_{35}	—	September 18, 2012	Mount Lemmon	Mount Lemmon Survey	EOS	1.5 km	MPC · JPL
763906	2012 SU_{41}	—	September 18, 2012	Mount Lemmon	Mount Lemmon Survey	EUN	850 m	MPC · JPL
763907	2012 SX_{42}	—	August 26, 2012	Haleakala	Pan-STARRS 1	·	2.1 km	MPC · JPL
763908	2012 SE_{43}	—	September 18, 2012	Mount Lemmon	Mount Lemmon Survey	L5	8.2 km	MPC · JPL
763909	2012 SN_{50}	—	August 28, 2006	Kitt Peak	Spacewatch	·	2.5 km	MPC · JPL
763910	2012 SZ_{51}	—	September 19, 2012	Mount Lemmon	Mount Lemmon Survey	EOS	1.3 km	MPC · JPL
763911	2012 SK_{52}	—	February 5, 2018	Mount Lemmon	Mount Lemmon Survey	V	510 m	MPC · JPL
763912	2012 SU_{55}	—	August 26, 2012	Haleakala	Pan-STARRS 1	·	990 m	MPC · JPL
763913	2012 SB_{56}	—	September 23, 2012	Westfield	International Astronomical Search Collaboration	·	1.2 km	MPC · JPL
763914	2012 SJ_{59}	—	September 16, 2012	Kitt Peak	Spacewatch	·	2.8 km	MPC · JPL
763915	2012 SO_{72}	—	September 21, 2012	Kitt Peak	Spacewatch	·	2.4 km	MPC · JPL
763916	2012 SH_{73}	—	September 17, 2012	Mount Lemmon	Mount Lemmon Survey	H	460 m	MPC · JPL
763917	2012 SZ_{73}	—	September 24, 2012	Kitt Peak	Spacewatch	·	2.3 km	MPC · JPL
763918	2012 SS_{75}	—	January 20, 2015	Haleakala	Pan-STARRS 1	EOS	1.5 km	MPC · JPL
763919	2012 SD_{78}	—	October 16, 1995	Kitt Peak	Spacewatch	·	2.6 km	MPC · JPL
763920	2012 SV_{81}	—	September 25, 2012	Mount Lemmon	Mount Lemmon Survey	LUT	2.6 km	MPC · JPL
763921	2012 SA_{82}	—	September 16, 2012	Mount Lemmon	Mount Lemmon Survey	·	2.4 km	MPC · JPL
763922	2012 SP_{82}	—	February 27, 2015	Haleakala	Pan-STARRS 1	·	2.3 km	MPC · JPL
763923	2012 SV_{82}	—	September 25, 2012	Mount Lemmon	Mount Lemmon Survey	·	2.2 km	MPC · JPL
763924	2012 SX_{82}	—	September 22, 2012	Mount Lemmon	Mount Lemmon Survey	·	2.3 km	MPC · JPL
763925	2012 SJ_{84}	—	January 29, 2015	Haleakala	Pan-STARRS 1	·	2.6 km	MPC · JPL
763926	2012 SX_{84}	—	October 10, 2018	Mount Lemmon	Mount Lemmon Survey	·	2.3 km	MPC · JPL
763927	2012 SZ_{84}	—	July 29, 2017	Haleakala	Pan-STARRS 1	·	1.9 km	MPC · JPL
763928	2012 SH_{85}	—	September 22, 2012	Kitt Peak	Spacewatch	L5	7.9 km	MPC · JPL
763929	2012 SO_{85}	—	September 24, 2012	Kitt Peak	Spacewatch	L5	6.5 km	MPC · JPL
763930	2012 SA_{86}	—	August 26, 2012	Haleakala	Pan-STARRS 1	·	2.2 km	MPC · JPL
763931	2012 SR_{86}	—	September 22, 2012	Kitt Peak	Spacewatch	·	2.0 km	MPC · JPL
763932	2012 SX_{86}	—	September 22, 2012	Kitt Peak	Spacewatch	·	2.1 km	MPC · JPL
763933	2012 SA_{87}	—	September 26, 2012	Mount Lemmon	Mount Lemmon Survey	·	2.3 km	MPC · JPL
763934	2012 SO_{87}	—	September 22, 2012	Kitt Peak	Spacewatch	·	2.2 km	MPC · JPL
763935	2012 SP_{87}	—	September 17, 2012	Mount Lemmon	Mount Lemmon Survey	L5	6.4 km	MPC · JPL
763936	2012 ST_{88}	—	September 19, 2012	Mount Lemmon	Mount Lemmon Survey	L5	6.8 km	MPC · JPL
763937	2012 SX_{88}	—	September 25, 2012	Mount Lemmon	Mount Lemmon Survey	·	2.2 km	MPC · JPL
763938	2012 SG_{89}	—	September 19, 2012	Mount Lemmon	Mount Lemmon Survey	THM	1.7 km	MPC · JPL
763939	2012 SU_{89}	—	September 23, 2012	Mount Lemmon	Mount Lemmon Survey	·	2.4 km	MPC · JPL
763940	2012 SX_{89}	—	September 17, 2012	Mount Lemmon	Mount Lemmon Survey	L5	7.4 km	MPC · JPL
763941	2012 SU_{94}	—	September 25, 2012	Mount Lemmon	Mount Lemmon Survey	VER	2.0 km	MPC · JPL
763942	2012 SC_{101}	—	September 19, 2012	Mount Lemmon	Mount Lemmon Survey	·	2.0 km	MPC · JPL
763943	2012 SB_{102}	—	September 26, 2012	Haleakala	Pan-STARRS 1	EOS	1.4 km	MPC · JPL
763944	2012 SG_{105}	—	September 16, 2012	Mauna Kea	P. A. Wiegert	L5	5.8 km	MPC · JPL
763945	2012 SN_{105}	—	September 19, 2012	Mount Lemmon	Mount Lemmon Survey	·	1.9 km	MPC · JPL
763946	2012 TN	—	July 28, 2011	Haleakala	Pan-STARRS 1	L5	5.9 km	MPC · JPL
763947	2012 TH_{2}	—	October 4, 2012	Haleakala	Pan-STARRS 1	·	2.5 km	MPC · JPL
763948	2012 TW_{3}	—	October 8, 2007	Mount Lemmon	Mount Lemmon Survey	·	1.8 km	MPC · JPL
763949	2012 TU_{6}	—	September 21, 2008	Mount Lemmon	Mount Lemmon Survey	V	510 m	MPC · JPL
763950	2012 TJ_{15}	—	September 20, 2012	Bergisch Gladbach	W. Bickel	L5	7.9 km	MPC · JPL
763951	2012 TN_{17}	—	October 5, 2012	Mount Lemmon	Mount Lemmon Survey	·	2.1 km	MPC · JPL
763952	2012 TA_{21}	—	October 4, 2012	Haleakala	Pan-STARRS 1	·	960 m	MPC · JPL
763953	2012 TM_{34}	—	October 7, 2012	Oukaïmeden	C. Rinner	T_{j} (2.99) · 3:2	4.0 km	MPC · JPL
763954	2012 TV_{35}	—	September 16, 2012	Kitt Peak	Spacewatch	·	2.1 km	MPC · JPL
763955	2012 TD_{38}	—	October 8, 2012	Mount Lemmon	Mount Lemmon Survey	·	1.7 km	MPC · JPL
763956	2012 TM_{39}	—	October 8, 2012	Mount Lemmon	Mount Lemmon Survey	L5	6.6 km	MPC · JPL
763957	2012 TW_{42}	—	October 8, 2012	Mount Lemmon	Mount Lemmon Survey	·	2.0 km	MPC · JPL
763958	2012 TF_{43}	—	October 8, 2012	Haleakala	Pan-STARRS 1	·	2.4 km	MPC · JPL
763959	2012 TM_{46}	—	October 8, 2012	Mount Lemmon	Mount Lemmon Survey	·	2.0 km	MPC · JPL
763960	2012 TJ_{47}	—	October 8, 2012	Haleakala	Pan-STARRS 1	·	2.1 km	MPC · JPL
763961	2012 TL_{47}	—	October 8, 2012	Haleakala	Pan-STARRS 1	L5	6.1 km	MPC · JPL
763962	2012 TQ_{48}	—	October 8, 2012	Haleakala	Pan-STARRS 1	·	910 m	MPC · JPL
763963	2012 TD_{49}	—	October 8, 2012	Haleakala	Pan-STARRS 1	·	2.4 km	MPC · JPL
763964	2012 TM_{49}	—	September 12, 2012	Westfield	International Astronomical Search Collaboration	·	2.0 km	MPC · JPL
763965	2012 TP_{52}	—	October 8, 2012	Haleakala	Pan-STARRS 1	L5	7.9 km	MPC · JPL
763966	2012 TL_{55}	—	September 23, 2012	Mount Lemmon	Mount Lemmon Survey	·	2.5 km	MPC · JPL
763967	2012 TT_{55}	—	September 15, 2012	Mount Lemmon	Mount Lemmon Survey	·	2.5 km	MPC · JPL
763968	2012 TN_{61}	—	October 8, 2012	Haleakala	Pan-STARRS 1	EOS	1.5 km	MPC · JPL
763969	2012 TW_{63}	—	October 8, 2012	Haleakala	Pan-STARRS 1	L5	6.3 km	MPC · JPL
763970	2012 TH_{64}	—	September 25, 2012	Kitt Peak	Spacewatch	T_{j} (2.99)	3.4 km	MPC · JPL
763971	2012 TE_{65}	—	October 8, 2012	Mount Lemmon	Mount Lemmon Survey	ADE	1.7 km	MPC · JPL
763972	2012 TG_{68}	—	October 8, 2012	Mount Lemmon	Mount Lemmon Survey	HYG	2.3 km	MPC · JPL
763973	2012 TF_{71}	—	September 16, 2012	Kitt Peak	Spacewatch	ARM	2.7 km	MPC · JPL
763974	2012 TF_{75}	—	October 9, 2012	Haleakala	Pan-STARRS 1	·	2.7 km	MPC · JPL
763975	2012 TW_{75}	—	October 9, 2012	Haleakala	Pan-STARRS 1	·	900 m	MPC · JPL
763976	2012 TU_{79}	—	October 10, 2012	Mount Lemmon	Mount Lemmon Survey	L5	6.0 km	MPC · JPL
763977	2012 TW_{79}	—	August 24, 2011	Haleakala	Pan-STARRS 1	L5	5.9 km	MPC · JPL
763978	2012 TE_{83}	—	October 6, 2012	Mount Lemmon	Mount Lemmon Survey	·	2.3 km	MPC · JPL
763979	2012 TU_{93}	—	October 7, 2012	Haleakala	Pan-STARRS 1	·	2.5 km	MPC · JPL
763980	2012 TR_{95}	—	November 9, 2007	Mount Lemmon	Mount Lemmon Survey	·	1.3 km	MPC · JPL
763981	2012 TR_{97}	—	September 15, 2012	Kitt Peak	Spacewatch	·	2.9 km	MPC · JPL
763982	2012 TT_{98}	—	March 24, 2009	Mount Lemmon	Mount Lemmon Survey	·	2.5 km	MPC · JPL
763983	2012 TF_{99}	—	October 8, 2012	Kitt Peak	Spacewatch	·	2.1 km	MPC · JPL
763984	2012 TM_{99}	—	October 8, 2012	Mount Lemmon	Mount Lemmon Survey	·	2.8 km	MPC · JPL
763985	2012 TS_{103}	—	October 9, 2012	Mount Lemmon	Mount Lemmon Survey	·	2.3 km	MPC · JPL
763986	2012 TH_{107}	—	October 10, 2012	Mount Lemmon	Mount Lemmon Survey	·	2.3 km	MPC · JPL
763987	2012 TM_{112}	—	October 10, 2012	Mount Lemmon	Mount Lemmon Survey	·	2.6 km	MPC · JPL
763988	2012 TH_{113}	—	October 10, 2012	Mount Lemmon	Mount Lemmon Survey	·	2.1 km	MPC · JPL
763989	2012 TK_{113}	—	October 10, 2012	Mount Lemmon	Mount Lemmon Survey	·	2.3 km	MPC · JPL
763990	2012 TO_{115}	—	October 10, 2012	Mount Lemmon	Mount Lemmon Survey	·	2.2 km	MPC · JPL
763991	2012 TG_{117}	—	October 10, 2012	Mount Lemmon	Mount Lemmon Survey	·	2.4 km	MPC · JPL
763992	2012 TJ_{117}	—	October 10, 2012	Mount Lemmon	Mount Lemmon Survey	·	2.0 km	MPC · JPL
763993	2012 TS_{117}	—	October 10, 2012	Mount Lemmon	Mount Lemmon Survey	·	1.7 km	MPC · JPL
763994	2012 TC_{118}	—	January 27, 2006	Kitt Peak	Spacewatch	·	1.0 km	MPC · JPL
763995	2012 TQ_{121}	—	October 12, 2007	Mount Lemmon	Mount Lemmon Survey	·	1.4 km	MPC · JPL
763996	2012 TG_{124}	—	October 9, 2012	Haleakala	Pan-STARRS 1	L5	8.0 km	MPC · JPL
763997	2012 TV_{127}	—	November 12, 2005	Kitt Peak	Spacewatch	PHO	940 m	MPC · JPL
763998	2012 TS_{129}	—	March 10, 2005	Mount Lemmon	Mount Lemmon Survey	T_{j} (2.99) · EUP	2.6 km	MPC · JPL
763999	2012 TH_{131}	—	October 6, 2012	Catalina	CSS	T_{j} (2.97)	3.2 km	MPC · JPL
764000	2012 TC_{139}	—	October 10, 2012	Mount Lemmon	Mount Lemmon Survey	·	2.6 km	MPC · JPL

back to top

== Meaning of names ==
As minor planet discoveries are confirmed, they are given a permanent number by the IAU's Minor Planet Center (MPC), and the discoverers can then submit names for them, following the IAU's naming conventions. The list below concerns those minor planets in the specified number-range that have received names, and explains the meanings of those names.

Official naming citations of newly named small Solar System bodies are approved and published in a bulletin by IAU's Working Group for Small Bodies Nomenclature (WGSBN). Before May 2021, citations were published in MPC's Minor Planet Circulars for many decades. Recent citations can also be found on the JPL Small-Body Database (SBDB). Until his death in 2016, German astronomer Lutz D. Schmadel compiled these citations into the Dictionary of Minor Planet Names (DMP) and regularly updated the collection.

Based on Paul Herget's The Names of the Minor Planets, Schmadel also researched the unclear origin of numerous asteroids, most of which had been named prior to World War II. This article incorporates text from this source, which is in the public domain: SBDB New namings may only be added to this list below after official publication as the preannouncement of names is condemned. The WGSBN publishes a comprehensive guideline for the naming rules of non-cometary small Solar System bodies.

Named minor planet	Provisional	This minor planet was named for...	Ref · Catalog
763488 Oniciuc	2012 DZ_{51}	Grigoruță Oniciuc, Romanian physics teacher at and director of the National College Petru Rareş in Piatra Neamţ.	IAU · 763488
763533 Alabiano	2012 EN_{6}	García Alabiano (1549–1624), Spanish Jesuit theologian who taught at the University of Vilnius, where he served as its second rector from 1585 to 1592.	IAU · 763533
