= List of minor planets: 711001–712000 =

The following is a partial list of minor planets, running from minor-planet number 711001 through 712000, inclusive. The primary data for this and other partial lists is based on JPL's "Small-Body Orbital Elements" and data available from the Minor Planet Center. Critical list information is also provided by the MPC, unless otherwise specified from Lowell Observatory. A detailed description of the table's columns and additional sources are given on the main page including a complete list of every page in this series, and a statistical break-up on the dynamical classification of minor planets.

Also see the summary list of all named bodies in numerical and alphabetical order, and the corresponding naming citations for the number range of this particular list. New namings may only be added to this list after official publication, as the preannouncement of names is condemned by the Working Group for Small Bodies Nomenclature of the International Astronomical Union.

Near-Earth obj.	MBA (inner)	MBA (outer)	Centaur
Mars-crosser	MBA (middle)	Jupiter trojan	Trans-Neptunian obj.
Unclassified

== 711001–711100 ==
Designation			Discovery			Properties		Ref
Permanent	Provisional	Named after	Date	Site	Discoverer(s)	Category	Diam.	Ref
711001	2014 HS_{137}	—	April 23, 2014	Cerro Tololo	DECam	·	2.4 km	MPC · JPL
711002	2014 HY_{137}	—	April 23, 2014	Cerro Tololo	DECam	·	1.4 km	MPC · JPL
711003	2014 HL_{138}	—	December 23, 2012	Haleakala	Pan-STARRS 1	·	1.0 km	MPC · JPL
711004	2014 HR_{138}	—	April 23, 2014	Cerro Tololo	DECam	·	480 m	MPC · JPL
711005	2014 HX_{138}	—	November 13, 2007	Mount Lemmon	Mount Lemmon Survey	·	1.5 km	MPC · JPL
711006	2014 HB_{139}	—	April 23, 2014	Cerro Tololo	DECam	·	1.6 km	MPC · JPL
711007	2014 HM_{140}	—	October 16, 2007	Mount Lemmon	Mount Lemmon Survey	·	1 km	MPC · JPL
711008	2014 HT_{142}	—	April 5, 2014	Haleakala	Pan-STARRS 1	WIT	740 m	MPC · JPL
711009	2014 HV_{142}	—	October 18, 2011	Mount Lemmon	Mount Lemmon Survey	·	1.5 km	MPC · JPL
711010	2014 HX_{143}	—	March 11, 2005	Kitt Peak	Spacewatch	·	2.1 km	MPC · JPL
711011	2014 HS_{144}	—	May 21, 2001	Cerro Tololo	Deep Ecliptic Survey	HNS	1.1 km	MPC · JPL
711012	2014 HF_{145}	—	November 1, 2008	Mount Lemmon	Mount Lemmon Survey	·	880 m	MPC · JPL
711013	2014 HJ_{146}	—	November 2, 2007	Mount Lemmon	Mount Lemmon Survey	·	1.2 km	MPC · JPL
711014	2014 HY_{150}	—	May 24, 2001	Cerro Tololo	Deep Ecliptic Survey	·	1.5 km	MPC · JPL
711015	2014 HC_{151}	—	October 30, 2011	Kitt Peak	Spacewatch	·	1.8 km	MPC · JPL
711016	2014 HE_{151}	—	March 21, 2001	Kitt Peak	Spacewatch	·	510 m	MPC · JPL
711017	2014 HK_{152}	—	April 7, 2005	Kitt Peak	Spacewatch	GEF	1.2 km	MPC · JPL
711018	2014 HH_{153}	—	April 23, 2014	Cerro Tololo	DECam	·	670 m	MPC · JPL
711019	2014 HX_{154}	—	April 5, 2014	Haleakala	Pan-STARRS 1	AGN	900 m	MPC · JPL
711020	2014 HZ_{154}	—	April 23, 2014	Haleakala	Pan-STARRS 1	·	1.6 km	MPC · JPL
711021	2014 HV_{155}	—	April 4, 2005	Mount Lemmon	Mount Lemmon Survey	·	1.6 km	MPC · JPL
711022	2014 HU_{157}	—	April 24, 2014	Mount Lemmon	Mount Lemmon Survey	·	1.9 km	MPC · JPL
711023	2014 HO_{159}	—	September 23, 2011	Haleakala	Pan-STARRS 1	·	1.6 km	MPC · JPL
711024	2014 HP_{160}	—	April 24, 2014	Mount Lemmon	Mount Lemmon Survey	·	1.5 km	MPC · JPL
711025	2014 HT_{161}	—	March 2, 2009	Mount Lemmon	Mount Lemmon Survey	·	1.8 km	MPC · JPL
711026	2014 HW_{161}	—	April 8, 2014	Haleakala	Pan-STARRS 1	·	1.8 km	MPC · JPL
711027	2014 HY_{161}	—	June 13, 2001	Anderson Mesa	LONEOS	·	1.8 km	MPC · JPL
711028	2014 HG_{166}	—	April 23, 2014	Mount Lemmon	Mount Lemmon Survey	·	1.5 km	MPC · JPL
711029	2014 HR_{170}	—	April 5, 2014	Haleakala	Pan-STARRS 1	·	2.1 km	MPC · JPL
711030	2014 HL_{171}	—	March 28, 2014	Mount Lemmon	Mount Lemmon Survey	·	1.2 km	MPC · JPL
711031	2014 HE_{172}	—	April 29, 2014	Haleakala	Pan-STARRS 1	·	1.6 km	MPC · JPL
711032	2014 HW_{172}	—	May 29, 2011	Mount Lemmon	Mount Lemmon Survey	·	430 m	MPC · JPL
711033	2014 HA_{176}	—	February 11, 2004	Kitt Peak	Spacewatch	·	1.8 km	MPC · JPL
711034	2014 HJ_{180}	—	April 29, 2014	Haleakala	Pan-STARRS 1	·	490 m	MPC · JPL
711035	2014 HO_{185}	—	April 7, 2014	Mount Lemmon	Mount Lemmon Survey	·	1.5 km	MPC · JPL
711036	2014 HW_{187}	—	August 28, 2012	Mount Lemmon	Mount Lemmon Survey	·	1.7 km	MPC · JPL
711037	2014 HX_{187}	—	March 7, 2014	Kitt Peak	Spacewatch	·	1.4 km	MPC · JPL
711038	2014 HM_{189}	—	October 10, 2007	Mount Lemmon	Mount Lemmon Survey	·	1.7 km	MPC · JPL
711039	2014 HP_{199}	—	October 30, 2007	Kitt Peak	Spacewatch	·	1.5 km	MPC · JPL
711040	2014 HW_{202}	—	October 21, 2006	Mount Lemmon	Mount Lemmon Survey	·	1.6 km	MPC · JPL
711041	2014 HD_{203}	—	April 25, 2014	Mount Lemmon	Mount Lemmon Survey	·	1.2 km	MPC · JPL
711042	2014 HE_{203}	—	September 4, 2011	Haleakala	Pan-STARRS 1	·	990 m	MPC · JPL
711043	2014 HL_{203}	—	January 15, 2008	Mount Lemmon	Mount Lemmon Survey	HOF	2.0 km	MPC · JPL
711044	2014 HO_{203}	—	January 4, 2013	Cerro Tololo	DECam	·	1.5 km	MPC · JPL
711045	2014 HT_{203}	—	April 30, 2014	Haleakala	Pan-STARRS 1	·	1.5 km	MPC · JPL
711046	2014 HV_{204}	—	April 24, 2014	Mount Lemmon	Mount Lemmon Survey	·	1.6 km	MPC · JPL
711047	2014 HF_{205}	—	June 10, 2010	Mount Lemmon	Mount Lemmon Survey	GEF	1.1 km	MPC · JPL
711048	2014 HP_{206}	—	April 30, 2014	Haleakala	Pan-STARRS 1	·	2.3 km	MPC · JPL
711049	2014 HP_{207}	—	December 21, 2008	Mount Lemmon	Mount Lemmon Survey	·	980 m	MPC · JPL
711050	2014 HE_{208}	—	April 30, 2014	Haleakala	Pan-STARRS 1	AGN	900 m	MPC · JPL
711051	2014 HM_{220}	—	April 29, 2014	Haleakala	Pan-STARRS 1	·	1.4 km	MPC · JPL
711052	2014 HQ_{220}	—	April 30, 2014	Haleakala	Pan-STARRS 1	·	1.9 km	MPC · JPL
711053	2014 HR_{220}	—	April 30, 2014	Haleakala	Pan-STARRS 1	·	1.8 km	MPC · JPL
711054	2014 HS_{220}	—	April 30, 2014	Haleakala	Pan-STARRS 1	PAD	1.5 km	MPC · JPL
711055	2014 HT_{220}	—	April 25, 2014	Mount Lemmon	Mount Lemmon Survey	HNS	1.1 km	MPC · JPL
711056	2014 HY_{220}	—	April 30, 2014	Haleakala	Pan-STARRS 1	·	1.3 km	MPC · JPL
711057	2014 HE_{221}	—	April 29, 2014	Haleakala	Pan-STARRS 1	EUN	990 m	MPC · JPL
711058	2014 HG_{224}	—	April 24, 2014	Mount Lemmon	Mount Lemmon Survey	·	1.5 km	MPC · JPL
711059	2014 HH_{224}	—	September 25, 2011	Haleakala	Pan-STARRS 1	·	1.8 km	MPC · JPL
711060	2014 HK_{224}	—	April 29, 2014	Haleakala	Pan-STARRS 1	·	1.8 km	MPC · JPL
711061	2014 HR_{225}	—	April 28, 2014	Haleakala	Pan-STARRS 1	·	1.3 km	MPC · JPL
711062	2014 HX_{226}	—	April 25, 2014	Mount Lemmon	Mount Lemmon Survey	NEM	1.7 km	MPC · JPL
711063	2014 HA_{227}	—	April 20, 2014	Mount Lemmon	Mount Lemmon Survey	·	1.1 km	MPC · JPL
711064	2014 HM_{231}	—	April 21, 2014	Mount Lemmon	Mount Lemmon Survey	·	1.7 km	MPC · JPL
711065	2014 HQ_{235}	—	April 30, 2014	Haleakala	Pan-STARRS 1	·	1.6 km	MPC · JPL
711066	2014 HO_{236}	—	April 20, 2014	Mount Lemmon	Mount Lemmon Survey	·	1.2 km	MPC · JPL
711067	2014 HQ_{237}	—	April 29, 2014	Haleakala	Pan-STARRS 1	·	1.6 km	MPC · JPL
711068	2014 HU_{237}	—	April 23, 2014	Cerro Tololo	DECam	·	1.4 km	MPC · JPL
711069	2014 HL_{239}	—	March 10, 2008	Mount Lemmon	Mount Lemmon Survey	·	1.9 km	MPC · JPL
711070	2014 HU_{239}	—	May 27, 2014	Haleakala	Pan-STARRS 1	PAD	1.1 km	MPC · JPL
711071	2014 HM_{244}	—	April 28, 2014	Cerro Tololo	DECam	·	2.1 km	MPC · JPL
711072	2014 HK_{251}	—	April 25, 2014	Cerro Tololo	DECam	EOS	1.1 km	MPC · JPL
711073	2014 HG_{256}	—	April 30, 2014	Haleakala	Pan-STARRS 1	·	1.5 km	MPC · JPL
711074	2014 HJ_{256}	—	April 2, 2014	Mount Lemmon	Mount Lemmon Survey	·	1.1 km	MPC · JPL
711075	2014 HD_{290}	—	March 21, 2009	Mount Lemmon	Mount Lemmon Survey	AGN	730 m	MPC · JPL
711076	2014 HX_{297}	—	April 23, 2014	Cerro Tololo	DECam	·	1.3 km	MPC · JPL
711077	2014 HU_{340}	—	April 23, 2014	Mount Lemmon	Mount Lemmon Survey	·	1.3 km	MPC · JPL
711078	2014 JG	—	May 2, 2014	Mount Lemmon	Mount Lemmon Survey	·	1.2 km	MPC · JPL
711079	2014 JC_{1}	—	December 30, 2008	Kitt Peak	Spacewatch	·	1.0 km	MPC · JPL
711080	2014 JU_{7}	—	May 3, 2014	Mount Lemmon	Mount Lemmon Survey	·	590 m	MPC · JPL
711081	2014 JU_{16}	—	May 2, 2014	Mount Lemmon	Mount Lemmon Survey	·	1.6 km	MPC · JPL
711082	2014 JO_{21}	—	April 8, 2014	Haleakala	Pan-STARRS 1	·	1.9 km	MPC · JPL
711083	2014 JB_{22}	—	May 4, 2014	Haleakala	Pan-STARRS 1	·	1.7 km	MPC · JPL
711084	2014 JD_{22}	—	May 4, 2014	Haleakala	Pan-STARRS 1	·	1 km	MPC · JPL
711085	2014 JE_{22}	—	May 4, 2014	Haleakala	Pan-STARRS 1	ADE	1.9 km	MPC · JPL
711086	2014 JJ_{24}	—	January 10, 2013	Haleakala	Pan-STARRS 1	·	1.8 km	MPC · JPL
711087	2014 JQ_{27}	—	April 8, 2014	Haleakala	Pan-STARRS 1	·	1.6 km	MPC · JPL
711088	2014 JT_{27}	—	September 23, 2011	Haleakala	Pan-STARRS 1	·	950 m	MPC · JPL
711089	2014 JX_{31}	—	April 29, 2014	Haleakala	Pan-STARRS 1	V	570 m	MPC · JPL
711090	2014 JL_{32}	—	November 30, 2011	Kitt Peak	Spacewatch	·	2.1 km	MPC · JPL
711091	2014 JH_{34}	—	October 23, 2003	Kitt Peak	Spacewatch	HNS	1.0 km	MPC · JPL
711092	2014 JM_{35}	—	May 4, 2014	Haleakala	Pan-STARRS 1	·	1.1 km	MPC · JPL
711093	2014 JM_{36}	—	May 3, 2014	Mount Lemmon	Mount Lemmon Survey	KOR	1.0 km	MPC · JPL
711094	2014 JQ_{36}	—	April 29, 2014	ESA OGS	ESA OGS	·	1.6 km	MPC · JPL
711095	2014 JW_{38}	—	September 15, 2006	Kitt Peak	Spacewatch	·	1.7 km	MPC · JPL
711096	2014 JO_{39}	—	February 3, 2013	Haleakala	Pan-STARRS 1	·	1.5 km	MPC · JPL
711097	2014 JH_{41}	—	August 28, 2006	Kitt Peak	Spacewatch	·	1.3 km	MPC · JPL
711098	2014 JS_{41}	—	May 5, 2014	Mount Lemmon	Mount Lemmon Survey	·	2.7 km	MPC · JPL
711099	2014 JA_{42}	—	May 5, 2014	Kitt Peak	Spacewatch	·	1.5 km	MPC · JPL
711100	2014 JU_{47}	—	February 2, 2013	Mount Lemmon	Mount Lemmon Survey	·	570 m	MPC · JPL

== 711101–711200 ==
back to top

Designation			Discovery			Properties		Ref
Permanent	Provisional	Named after	Date	Site	Discoverer(s)	Category	Diam.	Ref
711101	2014 JG_{50}	—	April 2, 2009	Kitt Peak	Spacewatch	·	1.6 km	MPC · JPL
711102	2014 JK_{50}	—	May 4, 2014	Mount Lemmon	Mount Lemmon Survey	KON	1.7 km	MPC · JPL
711103	2014 JZ_{54}	—	February 1, 2013	Haleakala	Pan-STARRS 1	L4	10 km	MPC · JPL
711104	2014 JT_{55}	—	November 27, 2012	Mount Lemmon	Mount Lemmon Survey	BAR	1.6 km	MPC · JPL
711105	2014 JW_{61}	—	April 22, 2009	Mount Lemmon	Mount Lemmon Survey	·	1.3 km	MPC · JPL
711106	2014 JV_{73}	—	March 1, 2009	Kitt Peak	Spacewatch	·	1.7 km	MPC · JPL
711107	2014 JQ_{84}	—	May 2, 2014	Mount Lemmon	Mount Lemmon Survey	AGN	1.0 km	MPC · JPL
711108	2014 JS_{84}	—	October 23, 2006	Mount Lemmon	Mount Lemmon Survey	EOS	1.5 km	MPC · JPL
711109	2014 JG_{86}	—	March 25, 2014	Kitt Peak	Spacewatch	·	1.5 km	MPC · JPL
711110	2014 JK_{86}	—	May 4, 2014	Haleakala	Pan-STARRS 1	·	1.5 km	MPC · JPL
711111	2014 JL_{86}	—	May 4, 2014	Haleakala	Pan-STARRS 1	·	1.2 km	MPC · JPL
711112	2014 JS_{86}	—	May 8, 2014	Haleakala	Pan-STARRS 1	MAR	850 m	MPC · JPL
711113	2014 JZ_{86}	—	November 5, 2007	Kitt Peak	Spacewatch	·	1.2 km	MPC · JPL
711114	2014 JP_{87}	—	May 2, 2014	Mount Lemmon	Mount Lemmon Survey	·	1.2 km	MPC · JPL
711115	2014 JX_{88}	—	January 17, 2013	Haleakala	Pan-STARRS 1	·	1.6 km	MPC · JPL
711116	2014 JF_{89}	—	May 6, 2014	Haleakala	Pan-STARRS 1	·	1.2 km	MPC · JPL
711117	2014 JL_{89}	—	May 6, 2014	Haleakala	Pan-STARRS 1	·	1.3 km	MPC · JPL
711118	2014 JU_{90}	—	May 9, 2014	Mount Lemmon	Mount Lemmon Survey	·	1.4 km	MPC · JPL
711119	2014 JE_{91}	—	February 6, 2002	Kitt Peak	Deep Ecliptic Survey	·	2.2 km	MPC · JPL
711120	2014 JL_{91}	—	October 4, 2011	Piszkés-tető	K. Sárneczky, S. Kürti	·	2.3 km	MPC · JPL
711121	2014 JG_{92}	—	May 5, 2014	Mount Lemmon	Mount Lemmon Survey	·	1.5 km	MPC · JPL
711122	2014 JO_{98}	—	May 8, 2014	Haleakala	Pan-STARRS 1	·	2.0 km	MPC · JPL
711123	2014 JO_{105}	—	May 6, 2014	Haleakala	Pan-STARRS 1	ADE	1.6 km	MPC · JPL
711124	2014 JS_{105}	—	May 8, 2014	Haleakala	Pan-STARRS 1	KOR	1.1 km	MPC · JPL
711125	2014 JT_{105}	—	May 8, 2014	Haleakala	Pan-STARRS 1	·	1.2 km	MPC · JPL
711126	2014 JN_{106}	—	May 8, 2014	Haleakala	Pan-STARRS 1	·	460 m	MPC · JPL
711127	2014 JP_{111}	—	May 7, 2014	Haleakala	Pan-STARRS 1	·	1.5 km	MPC · JPL
711128	2014 JX_{111}	—	May 8, 2014	Haleakala	Pan-STARRS 1	KOR	1.1 km	MPC · JPL
711129	2014 JB_{112}	—	May 7, 2014	Haleakala	Pan-STARRS 1	·	1.4 km	MPC · JPL
711130	2014 JO_{112}	—	May 3, 2014	Mount Lemmon	Mount Lemmon Survey	·	1.5 km	MPC · JPL
711131	2014 JY_{113}	—	May 4, 2014	Haleakala	Pan-STARRS 1	·	1.5 km	MPC · JPL
711132	2014 JN_{114}	—	May 5, 2014	Mount Lemmon	Mount Lemmon Survey	GEF	1.0 km	MPC · JPL
711133	2014 JH_{115}	—	May 6, 2014	Haleakala	Pan-STARRS 1	·	1.6 km	MPC · JPL
711134	2014 JK_{115}	—	May 3, 2014	Mount Lemmon	Mount Lemmon Survey	·	890 m	MPC · JPL
711135	2014 JN_{120}	—	January 19, 2013	Kitt Peak	Spacewatch	·	1.3 km	MPC · JPL
711136	2014 JR_{122}	—	May 8, 2014	Haleakala	Pan-STARRS 1	·	1.4 km	MPC · JPL
711137	2014 JX_{125}	—	May 8, 2014	Haleakala	Pan-STARRS 1	·	2.1 km	MPC · JPL
711138	2014 JA_{126}	—	March 30, 2008	Kitt Peak	Spacewatch	·	2.4 km	MPC · JPL
711139	2014 JC_{131}	—	May 6, 2014	Haleakala	Pan-STARRS 1	·	1.8 km	MPC · JPL
711140	2014 JZ_{137}	—	May 7, 2014	Haleakala	Pan-STARRS 1	·	1.2 km	MPC · JPL
711141	2014 JP_{140}	—	May 8, 2014	Haleakala	Pan-STARRS 1	·	2.0 km	MPC · JPL
711142	2014 JT_{150}	—	May 5, 2014	Mount Lemmon	Mount Lemmon Survey	·	920 m	MPC · JPL
711143	2014 KO	—	March 3, 2009	Catalina	CSS	DOR	2.1 km	MPC · JPL
711144	2014 KO_{5}	—	October 31, 2011	Kitt Peak	Spacewatch	·	1.8 km	MPC · JPL
711145	2014 KH_{9}	—	October 18, 2011	Mount Lemmon	Mount Lemmon Survey	·	1.6 km	MPC · JPL
711146	2014 KE_{10}	—	October 26, 2011	Haleakala	Pan-STARRS 1	·	1.7 km	MPC · JPL
711147	2014 KV_{12}	—	November 7, 2007	Mount Lemmon	Mount Lemmon Survey	·	830 m	MPC · JPL
711148	2014 KM_{13}	—	September 18, 2012	Mount Lemmon	Mount Lemmon Survey	·	570 m	MPC · JPL
711149	2014 KJ_{14}	—	May 21, 2014	Haleakala	Pan-STARRS 1	·	1.6 km	MPC · JPL
711150	2014 KL_{14}	—	May 21, 2014	Haleakala	Pan-STARRS 1	·	2.2 km	MPC · JPL
711151	2014 KN_{14}	—	March 16, 2010	Mount Lemmon	Mount Lemmon Survey	·	1.0 km	MPC · JPL
711152	2014 KG_{15}	—	October 18, 2011	Mount Lemmon	Mount Lemmon Survey	·	1.0 km	MPC · JPL
711153	2014 KZ_{16}	—	February 16, 2013	Mount Lemmon	Mount Lemmon Survey	HYG	2.1 km	MPC · JPL
711154	2014 KK_{17}	—	April 23, 2014	Kitt Peak	Spacewatch	·	1.6 km	MPC · JPL
711155	2014 KE_{20}	—	October 12, 2007	Mount Lemmon	Mount Lemmon Survey	·	1.5 km	MPC · JPL
711156	2014 KJ_{29}	—	November 18, 2011	Mount Lemmon	Mount Lemmon Survey	·	1.3 km	MPC · JPL
711157	2014 KD_{30}	—	October 12, 2010	Mount Lemmon	Mount Lemmon Survey	HYG	2.2 km	MPC · JPL
711158	2014 KL_{30}	—	April 30, 2014	ESA OGS	ESA OGS	·	1.5 km	MPC · JPL
711159	2014 KZ_{30}	—	April 29, 2014	ESA OGS	ESA OGS	·	1.6 km	MPC · JPL
711160	2014 KQ_{32}	—	May 7, 2014	Haleakala	Pan-STARRS 1	·	1.5 km	MPC · JPL
711161	2014 KF_{35}	—	September 16, 2010	Mount Lemmon	Mount Lemmon Survey	BRA	1.1 km	MPC · JPL
711162	2014 KH_{37}	—	January 31, 2013	Mount Lemmon	Mount Lemmon Survey	·	1.9 km	MPC · JPL
711163	2014 KS_{37}	—	December 11, 2012	Mount Lemmon	Mount Lemmon Survey	·	1.5 km	MPC · JPL
711164	2014 KF_{40}	—	May 21, 2014	Haleakala	Pan-STARRS 1	H	320 m	MPC · JPL
711165	2014 KY_{40}	—	October 1, 2006	Kitt Peak	Spacewatch	AGN	1.1 km	MPC · JPL
711166	2014 KP_{42}	—	May 21, 2014	Haleakala	Pan-STARRS 1	AGN	1.2 km	MPC · JPL
711167	2014 KJ_{47}	—	February 2, 2008	Mount Lemmon	Mount Lemmon Survey	KOR	1.1 km	MPC · JPL
711168	2014 KW_{48}	—	September 30, 2005	Mount Lemmon	Mount Lemmon Survey	EOS	1.5 km	MPC · JPL
711169	2014 KO_{49}	—	November 18, 2011	Mount Lemmon	Mount Lemmon Survey	·	1.5 km	MPC · JPL
711170	2014 KQ_{54}	—	September 17, 2006	Kitt Peak	Spacewatch	·	1.4 km	MPC · JPL
711171	2014 KO_{55}	—	September 25, 2006	Kitt Peak	Spacewatch	HOF	2.1 km	MPC · JPL
711172	2014 KV_{55}	—	May 7, 2014	Haleakala	Pan-STARRS 1	·	1.5 km	MPC · JPL
711173	2014 KF_{57}	—	June 17, 2010	Mount Lemmon	Mount Lemmon Survey	·	1.0 km	MPC · JPL
711174	2014 KR_{60}	—	November 29, 2011	Mount Lemmon	Mount Lemmon Survey	·	1.7 km	MPC · JPL
711175	2014 KH_{63}	—	August 28, 2003	Palomar	NEAT	·	1.1 km	MPC · JPL
711176	2014 KY_{63}	—	October 26, 2011	Haleakala	Pan-STARRS 1	KOR	1.1 km	MPC · JPL
711177	2014 KT_{65}	—	September 2, 2010	Mount Lemmon	Mount Lemmon Survey	·	1.6 km	MPC · JPL
711178	2014 KG_{69}	—	February 4, 2013	Oukaïmeden	C. Rinner	·	1.3 km	MPC · JPL
711179	2014 KK_{71}	—	October 20, 2001	Socorro	LINEAR	·	1.8 km	MPC · JPL
711180	2014 KL_{75}	—	November 12, 2012	Mount Lemmon	Mount Lemmon Survey	EUN	1.4 km	MPC · JPL
711181	2014 KK_{79}	—	January 26, 2006	Mount Lemmon	Mount Lemmon Survey	·	1.1 km	MPC · JPL
711182	2014 KX_{79}	—	September 26, 2006	Kitt Peak	Spacewatch	NEM	1.8 km	MPC · JPL
711183	2014 KK_{80}	—	May 6, 2014	Haleakala	Pan-STARRS 1	·	1.5 km	MPC · JPL
711184	2014 KN_{82}	—	August 31, 2005	Palomar	NEAT	·	740 m	MPC · JPL
711185	2014 KF_{86}	—	April 12, 1996	Kitt Peak	Spacewatch	·	1.8 km	MPC · JPL
711186	2014 KN_{92}	—	January 13, 2008	Mount Lemmon	Mount Lemmon Survey	·	1.4 km	MPC · JPL
711187	2014 KM_{97}	—	January 22, 2013	Mount Lemmon	Mount Lemmon Survey	·	1.6 km	MPC · JPL
711188	2014 KX_{97}	—	January 3, 2009	Mount Lemmon	Mount Lemmon Survey	·	1.3 km	MPC · JPL
711189	2014 KS_{98}	—	October 25, 2011	Haleakala	Pan-STARRS 1	·	1.1 km	MPC · JPL
711190	2014 KF_{99}	—	September 17, 2010	Mount Lemmon	Mount Lemmon Survey	·	1.8 km	MPC · JPL
711191	2014 KB_{100}	—	October 8, 2012	Haleakala	Pan-STARRS 1	H	370 m	MPC · JPL
711192	2014 KJ_{100}	—	March 8, 2009	Mount Lemmon	Mount Lemmon Survey	·	1.5 km	MPC · JPL
711193	2014 KO_{101}	—	September 3, 2010	Mount Lemmon	Mount Lemmon Survey	·	2.0 km	MPC · JPL
711194	2014 KW_{103}	—	January 4, 2013	Cerro Tololo	DECam	EUN	940 m	MPC · JPL
711195	2014 KH_{104}	—	May 28, 2014	Haleakala	Pan-STARRS 1	·	1.9 km	MPC · JPL
711196	2014 KL_{105}	—	May 21, 2014	Haleakala	Pan-STARRS 1	·	1.5 km	MPC · JPL
711197	2014 KG_{106}	—	February 9, 2005	Kitt Peak	Spacewatch	·	1.1 km	MPC · JPL
711198	2014 KY_{106}	—	November 9, 2007	Kitt Peak	Spacewatch	MAR	800 m	MPC · JPL
711199	2014 KD_{107}	—	February 9, 2013	Haleakala	Pan-STARRS 1	HOF	2.2 km	MPC · JPL
711200	2014 KT_{107}	—	May 21, 2014	Haleakala	Pan-STARRS 1	·	1.8 km	MPC · JPL

== 711201–711300 ==
back to top

Designation			Discovery			Properties		Ref
Permanent	Provisional	Named after	Date	Site	Discoverer(s)	Category	Diam.	Ref
711201	2014 KY_{108}	—	July 3, 2005	Mount Lemmon	Mount Lemmon Survey	·	1.5 km	MPC · JPL
711202	2014 KS_{109}	—	May 23, 2014	Haleakala	Pan-STARRS 1	·	1.4 km	MPC · JPL
711203	2014 KN_{111}	—	March 5, 2008	Mount Lemmon	Mount Lemmon Survey	·	1.7 km	MPC · JPL
711204	2014 KN_{116}	—	May 21, 2014	Mount Lemmon	Mount Lemmon Survey	·	1.8 km	MPC · JPL
711205	2014 KO_{125}	—	May 21, 2014	Haleakala	Pan-STARRS 1	AGN	920 m	MPC · JPL
711206	2014 KS_{125}	—	May 30, 2014	Haleakala	Pan-STARRS 1	·	560 m	MPC · JPL
711207	2014 KW_{125}	—	May 20, 2014	Haleakala	Pan-STARRS 1	·	1.6 km	MPC · JPL
711208	2014 KA_{127}	—	May 27, 2014	Haleakala	Pan-STARRS 1	·	1.8 km	MPC · JPL
711209	2014 KS_{127}	—	May 25, 2014	Haleakala	Pan-STARRS 1	·	3.5 km	MPC · JPL
711210	2014 KQ_{128}	—	May 21, 2014	Haleakala	Pan-STARRS 1	·	1.7 km	MPC · JPL
711211	2014 KK_{132}	—	May 28, 2014	Haleakala	Pan-STARRS 1	·	1.3 km	MPC · JPL
711212	2014 KR_{133}	—	May 20, 2014	Haleakala	Pan-STARRS 1	·	1.4 km	MPC · JPL
711213	2014 KT_{140}	—	May 30, 2014	Haleakala	Pan-STARRS 1	·	2.6 km	MPC · JPL
711214	2014 KA_{144}	—	May 24, 2014	Haleakala	Pan-STARRS 1	·	1.8 km	MPC · JPL
711215	2014 KC_{144}	—	May 21, 2014	Haleakala	Pan-STARRS 1	·	1.8 km	MPC · JPL
711216	2014 KX_{144}	—	May 21, 2014	Haleakala	Pan-STARRS 1	·	1.4 km	MPC · JPL
711217	2014 KE_{150}	—	May 7, 2014	Haleakala	Pan-STARRS 1	·	1.7 km	MPC · JPL
711218	2014 KN_{155}	—	May 20, 2014	Haleakala	Pan-STARRS 1	HOF	1.9 km	MPC · JPL
711219	2014 KO_{155}	—	May 24, 2014	Haleakala	Pan-STARRS 1	KOR	990 m	MPC · JPL
711220	2014 KA_{166}	—	May 21, 2014	Haleakala	Pan-STARRS 1	·	820 m	MPC · JPL
711221	2014 LF_{2}	—	March 29, 2009	Mount Lemmon	Mount Lemmon Survey	HOF	2.2 km	MPC · JPL
711222	2014 LH_{2}	—	May 8, 2014	Haleakala	Pan-STARRS 1	·	1.3 km	MPC · JPL
711223	2014 LU_{5}	—	February 16, 2013	Mount Lemmon	Mount Lemmon Survey	·	1.1 km	MPC · JPL
711224	2014 LJ_{6}	—	January 31, 2008	Mount Lemmon	Mount Lemmon Survey	HOF	2.3 km	MPC · JPL
711225	2014 LT_{6}	—	April 30, 2014	Haleakala	Pan-STARRS 1	·	1.7 km	MPC · JPL
711226	2014 LY_{6}	—	May 7, 2014	Haleakala	Pan-STARRS 1	·	1.6 km	MPC · JPL
711227	2014 LO_{7}	—	April 24, 2014	Kitt Peak	Spacewatch	·	430 m	MPC · JPL
711228	2014 LL_{8}	—	May 7, 2014	Haleakala	Pan-STARRS 1	·	1.4 km	MPC · JPL
711229	2014 LM_{8}	—	May 7, 2014	Haleakala	Pan-STARRS 1	·	1.6 km	MPC · JPL
711230	2014 LH_{14}	—	February 20, 2009	Catalina	CSS	·	2.1 km	MPC · JPL
711231	2014 LO_{20}	—	December 7, 2012	Haleakala	Pan-STARRS 1	·	1.7 km	MPC · JPL
711232	2014 LH_{23}	—	December 4, 2008	Kitt Peak	Spacewatch	·	1.2 km	MPC · JPL
711233	2014 LW_{23}	—	November 22, 2011	Mount Lemmon	Mount Lemmon Survey	EUN	950 m	MPC · JPL
711234	2014 LS_{24}	—	June 18, 2005	Mount Lemmon	Mount Lemmon Survey	·	1.8 km	MPC · JPL
711235	2014 LL_{27}	—	May 9, 2014	Haleakala	Pan-STARRS 1	EUN	880 m	MPC · JPL
711236	2014 LX_{29}	—	April 14, 2004	Siding Spring	SSS	·	2.1 km	MPC · JPL
711237	2014 LU_{30}	—	September 4, 2010	Mount Lemmon	Mount Lemmon Survey	EUN	1.3 km	MPC · JPL
711238	2014 LW_{30}	—	October 13, 2010	Mount Lemmon	Mount Lemmon Survey	·	1.8 km	MPC · JPL
711239	2014 LK_{32}	—	September 9, 2001	Anderson Mesa	LONEOS	·	2.3 km	MPC · JPL
711240	2014 LN_{32}	—	February 19, 2009	Kitt Peak	Spacewatch	·	1.5 km	MPC · JPL
711241	2014 LB_{37}	—	June 6, 2014	Haleakala	Pan-STARRS 1	·	1.8 km	MPC · JPL
711242	2014 LH_{38}	—	June 3, 2014	Haleakala	Pan-STARRS 1	·	2.7 km	MPC · JPL
711243	2014 LM_{38}	—	June 2, 2014	Mount Lemmon	Mount Lemmon Survey	HOF	2.1 km	MPC · JPL
711244	2014 LY_{39}	—	June 5, 2014	Haleakala	Pan-STARRS 1	·	2.0 km	MPC · JPL
711245	2014 MY_{3}	—	February 24, 2009	Mount Lemmon	Mount Lemmon Survey	·	1.8 km	MPC · JPL
711246	2014 MM_{6}	—	April 5, 2014	Haleakala	Pan-STARRS 1	·	1.3 km	MPC · JPL
711247	2014 MV_{9}	—	May 5, 2014	Mount Lemmon	Mount Lemmon Survey	EUN	990 m	MPC · JPL
711248	2014 MM_{11}	—	September 4, 2011	Haleakala	Pan-STARRS 1	·	450 m	MPC · JPL
711249	2014 MR_{12}	—	June 21, 2014	Mount Lemmon	Mount Lemmon Survey	·	2.4 km	MPC · JPL
711250	2014 ML_{13}	—	May 27, 2014	Haleakala	Pan-STARRS 1	·	1.6 km	MPC · JPL
711251	2014 MY_{14}	—	May 9, 2014	Haleakala	Pan-STARRS 1	H	480 m	MPC · JPL
711252	2014 MN_{32}	—	February 28, 2009	Kitt Peak	Spacewatch	·	1.6 km	MPC · JPL
711253	2014 MR_{33}	—	May 25, 2014	Haleakala	Pan-STARRS 1	·	1.7 km	MPC · JPL
711254	2014 ME_{37}	—	September 2, 2010	Mount Lemmon	Mount Lemmon Survey	·	1.2 km	MPC · JPL
711255	2014 MA_{46}	—	June 27, 2014	Haleakala	Pan-STARRS 1	·	1.8 km	MPC · JPL
711256	2014 MH_{50}	—	February 11, 2012	Mount Lemmon	Mount Lemmon Survey	·	1.8 km	MPC · JPL
711257	2014 MK_{51}	—	June 30, 2014	Kitt Peak	Spacewatch	·	3.0 km	MPC · JPL
711258	2014 MZ_{51}	—	October 30, 2005	Kitt Peak	Spacewatch	·	1.5 km	MPC · JPL
711259	2014 MC_{53}	—	July 4, 2005	Mount Lemmon	Mount Lemmon Survey	·	1.9 km	MPC · JPL
711260	2014 MU_{53}	—	December 14, 2010	Mount Lemmon	Mount Lemmon Survey	EOS	1.7 km	MPC · JPL
711261	2014 MY_{54}	—	March 14, 2013	Palomar	Palomar Transient Factory	GEF	1.2 km	MPC · JPL
711262	2014 MU_{56}	—	June 27, 2014	Haleakala	Pan-STARRS 1	AEO	970 m	MPC · JPL
711263	2014 ML_{59}	—	June 30, 2014	Mount Lemmon	Mount Lemmon Survey	EOS	1.5 km	MPC · JPL
711264	2014 MH_{62}	—	June 28, 2014	Kitt Peak	Spacewatch	·	1.7 km	MPC · JPL
711265	2014 MQ_{62}	—	January 27, 2007	Mount Lemmon	Mount Lemmon Survey	·	1.7 km	MPC · JPL
711266	2014 MO_{66}	—	November 1, 2010	Mount Lemmon	Mount Lemmon Survey	·	2.0 km	MPC · JPL
711267	2014 MO_{69}	—	February 16, 2009	Kitt Peak	Spacewatch	JUN	1.1 km	MPC · JPL
711268	2014 MH_{72}	—	June 24, 2014	Haleakala	Pan-STARRS 1	EOS	1.5 km	MPC · JPL
711269	2014 MY_{72}	—	September 17, 2009	Mount Lemmon	Mount Lemmon Survey	EOS	1.7 km	MPC · JPL
711270	2014 MT_{73}	—	September 17, 2009	Mount Lemmon	Mount Lemmon Survey	·	2.1 km	MPC · JPL
711271	2014 MM_{74}	—	March 10, 2008	Kitt Peak	Spacewatch	·	1.7 km	MPC · JPL
711272	2014 MR_{76}	—	June 28, 2014	Kitt Peak	Spacewatch	KOR	1.0 km	MPC · JPL
711273	2014 MX_{76}	—	June 28, 2014	Haleakala	Pan-STARRS 1	V	500 m	MPC · JPL
711274	2014 ME_{78}	—	June 30, 2014	Haleakala	Pan-STARRS 1	·	2.0 km	MPC · JPL
711275	2014 MH_{78}	—	June 30, 2014	Haleakala	Pan-STARRS 1	LIX	3.1 km	MPC · JPL
711276	2014 MZ_{80}	—	June 22, 2014	Haleakala	Pan-STARRS 1	·	1.8 km	MPC · JPL
711277	2014 MC_{92}	—	June 22, 2014	Mount Lemmon	Mount Lemmon Survey	·	2.9 km	MPC · JPL
711278	2014 MC_{95}	—	June 29, 2014	Haleakala	Pan-STARRS 1	(883)	470 m	MPC · JPL
711279	2014 MV_{96}	—	June 28, 2014	Haleakala	Pan-STARRS 1	·	880 m	MPC · JPL
711280	2014 MA_{100}	—	June 28, 2014	Haleakala	Pan-STARRS 1	·	1.6 km	MPC · JPL
711281	2014 ND_{1}	—	June 5, 2014	Haleakala	Pan-STARRS 1	KON	2.1 km	MPC · JPL
711282	2014 NP_{4}	—	July 1, 2014	Haleakala	Pan-STARRS 1	KOR	970 m	MPC · JPL
711283	2014 NO_{6}	—	September 17, 2010	Mount Lemmon	Mount Lemmon Survey	·	1.4 km	MPC · JPL
711284	2014 NW_{9}	—	September 18, 2011	Mount Lemmon	Mount Lemmon Survey	·	530 m	MPC · JPL
711285	2014 NC_{10}	—	July 1, 2014	Haleakala	Pan-STARRS 1	·	1.7 km	MPC · JPL
711286	2014 NX_{14}	—	October 6, 2005	Mount Lemmon	Mount Lemmon Survey	KOR	950 m	MPC · JPL
711287	2014 NM_{15}	—	November 19, 2006	Kitt Peak	Spacewatch	·	1.6 km	MPC · JPL
711288	2014 NG_{16}	—	June 3, 2014	Haleakala	Pan-STARRS 1	MAR	1.0 km	MPC · JPL
711289	2014 NW_{18}	—	February 25, 2007	Kitt Peak	Spacewatch	·	1.8 km	MPC · JPL
711290	2014 NF_{19}	—	September 5, 2010	Mount Lemmon	Mount Lemmon Survey	MAR	950 m	MPC · JPL
711291	2014 NQ_{19}	—	October 7, 2004	Kitt Peak	Spacewatch	·	1.6 km	MPC · JPL
711292	2014 NR_{21}	—	May 13, 2000	Kitt Peak	Spacewatch	·	3.9 km	MPC · JPL
711293	2014 NJ_{22}	—	June 3, 2008	Mount Lemmon	Mount Lemmon Survey	·	2.3 km	MPC · JPL
711294	2014 NR_{22}	—	July 2, 2014	Haleakala	Pan-STARRS 1	·	1.4 km	MPC · JPL
711295	2014 NZ_{22}	—	June 21, 2014	Mount Lemmon	Mount Lemmon Survey	·	2.1 km	MPC · JPL
711296	2014 NB_{23}	—	May 7, 2014	Haleakala	Pan-STARRS 1	BRA	1.5 km	MPC · JPL
711297	2014 NV_{23}	—	July 2, 2014	Haleakala	Pan-STARRS 1	·	1.9 km	MPC · JPL
711298	2014 NL_{24}	—	November 17, 2007	Kitt Peak	Spacewatch	·	1.3 km	MPC · JPL
711299	2014 NX_{24}	—	July 2, 2014	Haleakala	Pan-STARRS 1	·	2.1 km	MPC · JPL
711300	2014 NT_{25}	—	August 26, 2009	Catalina	CSS	·	1.8 km	MPC · JPL

== 711301–711400 ==
back to top

Designation			Discovery			Properties		Ref
Permanent	Provisional	Named after	Date	Site	Discoverer(s)	Category	Diam.	Ref
711301	2014 NC_{26}	—	February 16, 2007	Bergisch Gladbach	W. Bickel	·	2.0 km	MPC · JPL
711302	2014 NH_{26}	—	September 4, 2010	Kitt Peak	Spacewatch	AGN	830 m	MPC · JPL
711303	2014 NU_{27}	—	September 2, 2010	Mount Lemmon	Mount Lemmon Survey	·	1.7 km	MPC · JPL
711304	2014 NV_{28}	—	February 14, 2002	Cerro Tololo	Deep Lens Survey	·	1.9 km	MPC · JPL
711305	2014 NN_{32}	—	July 2, 2014	Haleakala	Pan-STARRS 1	615	1.0 km	MPC · JPL
711306	2014 NC_{33}	—	March 12, 2000	Kitt Peak	Spacewatch	·	620 m	MPC · JPL
711307	2014 NL_{34}	—	July 2, 2014	Haleakala	Pan-STARRS 1	·	1.9 km	MPC · JPL
711308	2014 NJ_{38}	—	September 16, 2010	Mount Lemmon	Mount Lemmon Survey	·	1.9 km	MPC · JPL
711309	2014 NW_{39}	—	July 3, 2014	Haleakala	Pan-STARRS 1	·	2.3 km	MPC · JPL
711310	2014 NC_{41}	—	May 8, 2005	Mount Lemmon	Mount Lemmon Survey	·	1.3 km	MPC · JPL
711311	2014 NA_{46}	—	July 1, 2014	Haleakala	Pan-STARRS 1	·	1.2 km	MPC · JPL
711312	2014 NE_{47}	—	December 5, 2007	Mount Lemmon	Mount Lemmon Survey	H	440 m	MPC · JPL
711313	2014 NJ_{49}	—	July 3, 2014	Haleakala	Pan-STARRS 1	·	2.9 km	MPC · JPL
711314	2014 NL_{56}	—	January 2, 2011	Mount Lemmon	Mount Lemmon Survey	EMA	2.8 km	MPC · JPL
711315	2014 NE_{57}	—	December 8, 2010	Kitt Peak	Spacewatch	EOS	1.7 km	MPC · JPL
711316	2014 NM_{57}	—	July 6, 2014	Haleakala	Pan-STARRS 1	·	1.1 km	MPC · JPL
711317	2014 NB_{58}	—	December 11, 2012	Catalina	CSS	H	440 m	MPC · JPL
711318	2014 NQ_{67}	—	September 23, 2005	Catalina	CSS	·	1.8 km	MPC · JPL
711319	2014 NU_{68}	—	July 8, 2014	Haleakala	Pan-STARRS 1	·	2.5 km	MPC · JPL
711320	2014 NG_{69}	—	August 22, 2004	Kitt Peak	Spacewatch	KOR	1.3 km	MPC · JPL
711321	2014 NH_{70}	—	January 1, 2012	Mount Lemmon	Mount Lemmon Survey	·	2.5 km	MPC · JPL
711322	2014 NK_{70}	—	July 3, 2014	Haleakala	Pan-STARRS 1	·	1.9 km	MPC · JPL
711323	2014 NE_{71}	—	November 3, 2010	Kitt Peak	Spacewatch	·	1.6 km	MPC · JPL
711324	2014 NU_{71}	—	July 7, 2014	Haleakala	Pan-STARRS 1	·	1.4 km	MPC · JPL
711325	2014 NX_{71}	—	July 7, 2014	Haleakala	Pan-STARRS 1	·	1.4 km	MPC · JPL
711326	2014 NV_{72}	—	July 8, 2014	Haleakala	Pan-STARRS 1	·	1.4 km	MPC · JPL
711327 Ovidiuignat	2014 NA_{73}	Ovidiuignat	July 10, 2014	La Palma	EURONEAR	·	1.6 km	MPC · JPL
711328	2014 NQ_{73}	—	July 8, 2014	Haleakala	Pan-STARRS 1	·	1.3 km	MPC · JPL
711329	2014 NT_{79}	—	July 2, 2014	Haleakala	Pan-STARRS 1	PAD	1.3 km	MPC · JPL
711330	2014 NV_{79}	—	July 6, 2014	Haleakala	Pan-STARRS 1	·	2.0 km	MPC · JPL
711331	2014 NF_{80}	—	July 8, 2014	Haleakala	Pan-STARRS 1	·	1.9 km	MPC · JPL
711332	2014 NH_{82}	—	July 1, 2014	Haleakala	Pan-STARRS 1	·	1.7 km	MPC · JPL
711333	2014 NE_{83}	—	July 1, 2014	Haleakala	Pan-STARRS 1	EOS	1.5 km	MPC · JPL
711334	2014 NG_{83}	—	July 7, 2014	Haleakala	Pan-STARRS 1	·	1.4 km	MPC · JPL
711335	2014 NP_{84}	—	July 1, 2014	Haleakala	Pan-STARRS 1	·	2.3 km	MPC · JPL
711336	2014 NO_{86}	—	July 2, 2014	Haleakala	Pan-STARRS 1	·	1.4 km	MPC · JPL
711337	2014 NH_{87}	—	July 4, 2014	Haleakala	Pan-STARRS 1	EOS	1.4 km	MPC · JPL
711338	2014 NP_{87}	—	July 4, 2014	Haleakala	Pan-STARRS 1	·	1.9 km	MPC · JPL
711339	2014 NE_{93}	—	July 8, 2014	Haleakala	Pan-STARRS 1	·	1.9 km	MPC · JPL
711340	2014 NS_{98}	—	July 3, 2014	Haleakala	Pan-STARRS 1	·	2.2 km	MPC · JPL
711341	2014 OA_{4}	—	July 3, 2014	Haleakala	Pan-STARRS 1	H	510 m	MPC · JPL
711342	2014 OP_{5}	—	March 15, 2012	Mount Lemmon	Mount Lemmon Survey	·	2.0 km	MPC · JPL
711343	2014 OX_{8}	—	May 25, 2014	Haleakala	Pan-STARRS 1	BRA	1.2 km	MPC · JPL
711344	2014 OL_{9}	—	July 25, 2014	Haleakala	Pan-STARRS 1	·	2.0 km	MPC · JPL
711345	2014 OJ_{10}	—	December 20, 2000	Kitt Peak	Spacewatch	·	2.4 km	MPC · JPL
711346	2014 OJ_{13}	—	January 27, 2012	Mount Lemmon	Mount Lemmon Survey	HOF	2.3 km	MPC · JPL
711347	2014 OO_{13}	—	October 31, 2008	Mount Lemmon	Mount Lemmon Survey	·	580 m	MPC · JPL
711348	2014 OQ_{13}	—	December 10, 2010	Mount Lemmon	Mount Lemmon Survey	EOS	1.5 km	MPC · JPL
711349	2014 ON_{16}	—	June 26, 2014	Haleakala	Pan-STARRS 1	·	1.6 km	MPC · JPL
711350	2014 ON_{18}	—	August 16, 2002	Palomar	NEAT	·	1.1 km	MPC · JPL
711351	2014 OE_{19}	—	July 2, 2014	Haleakala	Pan-STARRS 1	·	850 m	MPC · JPL
711352	2014 OD_{24}	—	July 25, 2014	Haleakala	Pan-STARRS 1	KOR	1.1 km	MPC · JPL
711353	2014 OX_{24}	—	January 14, 2011	Kitt Peak	Spacewatch	·	2.7 km	MPC · JPL
711354	2014 OS_{25}	—	June 2, 2014	Haleakala	Pan-STARRS 1	·	1.6 km	MPC · JPL
711355	2014 OG_{26}	—	July 25, 2014	Haleakala	Pan-STARRS 1	·	1.5 km	MPC · JPL
711356	2014 OC_{27}	—	April 16, 2013	Cerro Tololo	DECam	·	1.4 km	MPC · JPL
711357	2014 OD_{27}	—	June 2, 2014	Haleakala	Pan-STARRS 1	·	1.2 km	MPC · JPL
711358	2014 OH_{30}	—	July 25, 2014	Haleakala	Pan-STARRS 1	·	2.1 km	MPC · JPL
711359	2014 OL_{31}	—	July 25, 2014	Haleakala	Pan-STARRS 1	·	2.5 km	MPC · JPL
711360	2014 OX_{33}	—	July 25, 2014	Haleakala	Pan-STARRS 1	KOR	930 m	MPC · JPL
711361	2014 OG_{34}	—	June 27, 2014	Haleakala	Pan-STARRS 1	EOS	1.4 km	MPC · JPL
711362	2014 OZ_{34}	—	January 29, 2012	Mount Lemmon	Mount Lemmon Survey	EOS	1.6 km	MPC · JPL
711363	2014 OD_{35}	—	October 30, 2011	Zelenchukskaya Station	T. V. Kryachko. B. Satovski	·	610 m	MPC · JPL
711364	2014 OT_{36}	—	January 2, 2012	Kitt Peak	Spacewatch	KOR	1.1 km	MPC · JPL
711365	2014 OB_{40}	—	July 25, 2014	Haleakala	Pan-STARRS 1	·	1.7 km	MPC · JPL
711366	2014 OF_{48}	—	July 25, 2014	Haleakala	Pan-STARRS 1	KOR	1.0 km	MPC · JPL
711367	2014 OF_{54}	—	August 10, 2009	Kitt Peak	Spacewatch	EOS	1.5 km	MPC · JPL
711368	2014 OM_{56}	—	June 28, 2014	Kitt Peak	Spacewatch	·	1.7 km	MPC · JPL
711369	2014 OE_{57}	—	December 3, 2005	Mauna Kea	A. Boattini	·	680 m	MPC · JPL
711370	2014 OU_{57}	—	January 13, 2008	Kitt Peak	Spacewatch	·	1.5 km	MPC · JPL
711371	2014 OL_{59}	—	November 28, 2011	Mount Lemmon	Mount Lemmon Survey	·	1.7 km	MPC · JPL
711372	2014 OB_{60}	—	June 27, 2014	Haleakala	Pan-STARRS 1	EOS	1.5 km	MPC · JPL
711373	2014 OB_{61}	—	March 13, 2013	Kitt Peak	Spacewatch	·	1.6 km	MPC · JPL
711374	2014 OD_{61}	—	July 3, 2014	Haleakala	Pan-STARRS 1	AGN	960 m	MPC · JPL
711375	2014 OF_{62}	—	July 25, 2014	Haleakala	Pan-STARRS 1	·	1.4 km	MPC · JPL
711376	2014 OX_{62}	—	March 9, 2007	Kitt Peak	Spacewatch	·	2.2 km	MPC · JPL
711377	2014 OJ_{63}	—	September 25, 2005	Kitt Peak	Spacewatch	AGN	1.2 km	MPC · JPL
711378	2014 OV_{63}	—	June 28, 2014	Haleakala	Pan-STARRS 1	·	2.1 km	MPC · JPL
711379	2014 OO_{64}	—	July 25, 2014	Haleakala	Pan-STARRS 1	·	640 m	MPC · JPL
711380	2014 ON_{66}	—	July 25, 2014	Haleakala	Pan-STARRS 1	KOR	1.0 km	MPC · JPL
711381	2014 OX_{69}	—	January 27, 2012	Mount Lemmon	Mount Lemmon Survey	·	1.6 km	MPC · JPL
711382	2014 OV_{73}	—	May 10, 2014	Haleakala	Pan-STARRS 1	·	1.9 km	MPC · JPL
711383	2014 OP_{76}	—	July 19, 2014	iTelescope	Falla, N.	·	880 m	MPC · JPL
711384	2014 OY_{79}	—	June 30, 2014	Haleakala	Pan-STARRS 1	·	1.4 km	MPC · JPL
711385	2014 OV_{80}	—	July 26, 2014	Haleakala	Pan-STARRS 1	V	540 m	MPC · JPL
711386	2014 OQ_{88}	—	July 4, 2014	Haleakala	Pan-STARRS 1	BRA	1.3 km	MPC · JPL
711387	2014 OO_{99}	—	February 9, 2008	Kitt Peak	Spacewatch	HNS	970 m	MPC · JPL
711388	2014 OC_{104}	—	January 30, 2006	Kitt Peak	Spacewatch	·	2.7 km	MPC · JPL
711389	2014 OF_{104}	—	April 15, 2008	Mount Lemmon	Mount Lemmon Survey	·	1.7 km	MPC · JPL
711390	2014 OS_{104}	—	July 27, 2014	ESA OGS	ESA OGS	EOS	1.7 km	MPC · JPL
711391	2014 OU_{104}	—	July 25, 2014	Haleakala	Pan-STARRS 1	·	1.4 km	MPC · JPL
711392	2014 OH_{105}	—	April 29, 2008	Kitt Peak	Spacewatch	·	1.8 km	MPC · JPL
711393	2014 OW_{105}	—	June 27, 2014	Haleakala	Pan-STARRS 1	·	1.4 km	MPC · JPL
711394	2014 OB_{108}	—	October 14, 2007	Mount Lemmon	Mount Lemmon Survey	·	2.6 km	MPC · JPL
711395	2014 OL_{108}	—	August 15, 2009	Kitt Peak	Spacewatch	EOS	1.6 km	MPC · JPL
711396	2014 OB_{110}	—	October 9, 2010	Kitt Peak	Spacewatch	·	1.5 km	MPC · JPL
711397	2014 OE_{113}	—	April 1, 2008	Kitt Peak	Spacewatch	·	1.6 km	MPC · JPL
711398	2014 OZ_{115}	—	September 29, 2010	Mount Lemmon	Mount Lemmon Survey	KOR	1.1 km	MPC · JPL
711399	2014 OV_{116}	—	July 25, 2014	Haleakala	Pan-STARRS 1	·	1.6 km	MPC · JPL
711400	2014 OZ_{116}	—	November 20, 2006	Kitt Peak	Spacewatch	PAD	1.2 km	MPC · JPL

== 711401–711500 ==
back to top

Designation			Discovery			Properties		Ref
Permanent	Provisional	Named after	Date	Site	Discoverer(s)	Category	Diam.	Ref
711401	2014 OD_{118}	—	January 19, 2012	Haleakala	Pan-STARRS 1	·	1.7 km	MPC · JPL
711402	2014 OQ_{118}	—	June 25, 2014	Mount Lemmon	Mount Lemmon Survey	·	1.9 km	MPC · JPL
711403	2014 OB_{120}	—	February 8, 2007	Mount Lemmon	Mount Lemmon Survey	·	2.2 km	MPC · JPL
711404	2014 OD_{120}	—	December 21, 2006	Mount Lemmon	Mount Lemmon Survey	·	1.8 km	MPC · JPL
711405	2014 OJ_{120}	—	June 29, 2014	Haleakala	Pan-STARRS 1	·	2.2 km	MPC · JPL
711406	2014 OF_{122}	—	July 7, 2010	WISE	WISE	·	1.5 km	MPC · JPL
711407	2014 OG_{123}	—	January 20, 2007	Pla D'Arguines	R. Ferrando, Ferrando, M.	·	1.7 km	MPC · JPL
711408	2014 OJ_{123}	—	November 10, 1999	Kitt Peak	Spacewatch	·	2.0 km	MPC · JPL
711409	2014 OM_{123}	—	June 27, 2014	Haleakala	Pan-STARRS 1	EOS	1.3 km	MPC · JPL
711410	2014 OX_{124}	—	October 8, 2010	Kitt Peak	Spacewatch	·	1.5 km	MPC · JPL
711411	2014 OE_{126}	—	July 3, 2014	Haleakala	Pan-STARRS 1	KOR	890 m	MPC · JPL
711412	2014 OV_{126}	—	June 27, 2014	Haleakala	Pan-STARRS 1	KOR	1.0 km	MPC · JPL
711413	2014 OW_{127}	—	July 25, 2014	Haleakala	Pan-STARRS 1	·	1.5 km	MPC · JPL
711414	2014 OJ_{134}	—	July 27, 2014	Haleakala	Pan-STARRS 1	·	2.0 km	MPC · JPL
711415	2014 OA_{135}	—	February 9, 2008	Mount Lemmon	Mount Lemmon Survey	NEM	2.1 km	MPC · JPL
711416	2014 OM_{137}	—	June 4, 2014	Haleakala	Pan-STARRS 1	·	490 m	MPC · JPL
711417	2014 OS_{138}	—	February 8, 2013	Kitt Peak	Spacewatch	·	710 m	MPC · JPL
711418	2014 OA_{139}	—	March 16, 2004	Mauna Kea	D. D. Balam	·	1.3 km	MPC · JPL
711419	2014 OS_{141}	—	March 18, 2013	Kitt Peak	Spacewatch	HOF	2.3 km	MPC · JPL
711420	2014 OY_{144}	—	January 21, 2012	Kitt Peak	Spacewatch	EOS	1.4 km	MPC · JPL
711421	2014 OH_{147}	—	April 18, 2013	Mount Lemmon	Mount Lemmon Survey	·	1.6 km	MPC · JPL
711422	2014 OZ_{152}	—	June 30, 2014	Haleakala	Pan-STARRS 1	·	1.1 km	MPC · JPL
711423	2014 OC_{161}	—	October 26, 2006	Mauna Kea	P. A. Wiegert	·	1.2 km	MPC · JPL
711424	2014 OH_{163}	—	July 27, 2014	Haleakala	Pan-STARRS 1	·	1.5 km	MPC · JPL
711425	2014 OG_{164}	—	April 13, 2004	Kitt Peak	Spacewatch	MRX	850 m	MPC · JPL
711426	2014 OP_{165}	—	February 4, 2009	Mount Lemmon	Mount Lemmon Survey	·	1.5 km	MPC · JPL
711427	2014 OJ_{169}	—	June 29, 2014	Haleakala	Pan-STARRS 1	·	540 m	MPC · JPL
711428	2014 OD_{171}	—	July 27, 2014	Haleakala	Pan-STARRS 1	·	490 m	MPC · JPL
711429	2014 OM_{171}	—	July 27, 2014	Haleakala	Pan-STARRS 1	HOF	2.2 km	MPC · JPL
711430	2014 OK_{179}	—	October 1, 2011	San Marcello	San Marcello	·	950 m	MPC · JPL
711431	2014 ON_{179}	—	August 4, 2005	Palomar	NEAT	GEF	1.1 km	MPC · JPL
711432	2014 OX_{179}	—	May 3, 2008	Kitt Peak	Spacewatch	·	1.8 km	MPC · JPL
711433	2014 OS_{182}	—	July 27, 2014	Haleakala	Pan-STARRS 1	EOS	1.4 km	MPC · JPL
711434	2014 OY_{183}	—	July 27, 2014	Haleakala	Pan-STARRS 1	·	1.8 km	MPC · JPL
711435	2014 OC_{184}	—	September 4, 2010	Mount Lemmon	Mount Lemmon Survey	·	1.7 km	MPC · JPL
711436	2014 OG_{184}	—	September 24, 2009	Mount Lemmon	Mount Lemmon Survey	EOS	1.5 km	MPC · JPL
711437	2014 OD_{189}	—	July 27, 2014	Haleakala	Pan-STARRS 1	NYS	1.1 km	MPC · JPL
711438	2014 OL_{189}	—	July 27, 2014	Haleakala	Pan-STARRS 1	·	2.4 km	MPC · JPL
711439	2014 OS_{191}	—	July 27, 2014	Haleakala	Pan-STARRS 1	·	540 m	MPC · JPL
711440	2014 OY_{197}	—	July 27, 2014	Haleakala	Pan-STARRS 1	·	1.8 km	MPC · JPL
711441	2014 OT_{199}	—	July 28, 2014	Haleakala	Pan-STARRS 1	·	710 m	MPC · JPL
711442	2014 OF_{200}	—	December 30, 2011	Kitt Peak	Spacewatch	·	1.8 km	MPC · JPL
711443	2014 OY_{200}	—	October 17, 2010	Mount Lemmon	Mount Lemmon Survey	KOR	1 km	MPC · JPL
711444	2014 OZ_{204}	—	February 27, 2012	Haleakala	Pan-STARRS 1	·	2.2 km	MPC · JPL
711445	2014 OS_{205}	—	July 3, 2014	Haleakala	Pan-STARRS 1	·	1.9 km	MPC · JPL
711446	2014 OY_{207}	—	July 25, 2014	Haleakala	Pan-STARRS 1	AST	1.1 km	MPC · JPL
711447	2014 OJ_{210}	—	July 25, 2014	Haleakala	Pan-STARRS 1	·	2.4 km	MPC · JPL
711448	2014 OM_{212}	—	May 10, 2014	Haleakala	Pan-STARRS 1	·	1.8 km	MPC · JPL
711449	2014 OE_{213}	—	January 25, 2007	Kitt Peak	Spacewatch	·	1.7 km	MPC · JPL
711450	2014 OJ_{213}	—	January 15, 2010	Kitt Peak	Spacewatch	·	610 m	MPC · JPL
711451	2014 OE_{215}	—	August 1, 2000	Cerro Tololo	Deep Ecliptic Survey	·	1.4 km	MPC · JPL
711452	2014 OL_{215}	—	November 11, 2010	Mount Lemmon	Mount Lemmon Survey	·	1.6 km	MPC · JPL
711453	2014 OC_{217}	—	April 6, 2008	Mount Lemmon	Mount Lemmon Survey	EOS	1.6 km	MPC · JPL
711454	2014 OU_{219}	—	February 15, 2007	Anderson Mesa	Wasserman, L. H.	·	2.0 km	MPC · JPL
711455	2014 OO_{220}	—	September 21, 2011	Kitt Peak	Spacewatch	·	580 m	MPC · JPL
711456	2014 OJ_{221}	—	June 29, 2014	Haleakala	Pan-STARRS 1	·	1.5 km	MPC · JPL
711457	2014 OT_{221}	—	February 9, 2007	Kitt Peak	Spacewatch	·	2.4 km	MPC · JPL
711458	2014 OV_{222}	—	June 29, 2014	Haleakala	Pan-STARRS 1	·	1.9 km	MPC · JPL
711459	2014 OL_{225}	—	June 29, 2014	Haleakala	Pan-STARRS 1	·	1.6 km	MPC · JPL
711460	2014 OP_{226}	—	July 6, 2014	Haleakala	Pan-STARRS 1	EOS	1.6 km	MPC · JPL
711461	2014 OY_{226}	—	November 28, 1994	Kitt Peak	Spacewatch	·	1.9 km	MPC · JPL
711462	2014 OS_{227}	—	January 26, 2012	Haleakala	Pan-STARRS 1	·	2.0 km	MPC · JPL
711463	2014 OQ_{229}	—	July 27, 2014	Haleakala	Pan-STARRS 1	·	2.1 km	MPC · JPL
711464	2014 OP_{231}	—	July 27, 2014	Haleakala	Pan-STARRS 1	·	560 m	MPC · JPL
711465	2014 OT_{232}	—	March 23, 2012	Mount Lemmon	Mount Lemmon Survey	KOR	1.4 km	MPC · JPL
711466	2014 OJ_{234}	—	July 8, 2014	Haleakala	Pan-STARRS 1	(2076)	580 m	MPC · JPL
711467	2014 OE_{235}	—	November 2, 2007	Mount Lemmon	Mount Lemmon Survey	MAR	1.1 km	MPC · JPL
711468	2014 OM_{235}	—	May 7, 2014	Haleakala	Pan-STARRS 1	ADE	1.7 km	MPC · JPL
711469	2014 OC_{238}	—	January 9, 2002	Kitt Peak	Spacewatch	(2076)	630 m	MPC · JPL
711470	2014 OO_{239}	—	July 25, 2014	Haleakala	Pan-STARRS 1	·	540 m	MPC · JPL
711471	2014 OK_{245}	—	December 25, 2011	Kitt Peak	Spacewatch	·	1.7 km	MPC · JPL
711472	2014 OQ_{246}	—	July 29, 2014	Haleakala	Pan-STARRS 1	·	1.6 km	MPC · JPL
711473	2014 OT_{248}	—	October 28, 2010	Mount Lemmon	Mount Lemmon Survey	·	2.0 km	MPC · JPL
711474	2014 OH_{249}	—	March 4, 2013	Haleakala	Pan-STARRS 1	·	1.5 km	MPC · JPL
711475	2014 OR_{249}	—	January 26, 2007	Kitt Peak	Spacewatch	·	1.9 km	MPC · JPL
711476	2014 OJ_{251}	—	July 29, 2014	Haleakala	Pan-STARRS 1	EOS	1.4 km	MPC · JPL
711477	2014 OG_{253}	—	July 29, 2014	Haleakala	Pan-STARRS 1	EOS	1.4 km	MPC · JPL
711478	2014 OC_{254}	—	August 19, 2009	Hibiscus	Teamo, N.	·	2.0 km	MPC · JPL
711479	2014 OH_{256}	—	October 15, 2001	Kitt Peak	Spacewatch	·	1.6 km	MPC · JPL
711480	2014 OT_{261}	—	April 11, 2013	Kitt Peak	Spacewatch	·	2.0 km	MPC · JPL
711481	2014 OR_{265}	—	July 29, 2014	Haleakala	Pan-STARRS 1	·	1.4 km	MPC · JPL
711482	2014 OY_{265}	—	July 29, 2014	Haleakala	Pan-STARRS 1	EOS	1.7 km	MPC · JPL
711483	2014 OD_{266}	—	July 5, 2011	Haleakala	Pan-STARRS 1	·	640 m	MPC · JPL
711484	2014 OH_{266}	—	June 29, 2014	Haleakala	Pan-STARRS 1	·	1.7 km	MPC · JPL
711485	2014 OV_{266}	—	November 13, 2010	Mount Lemmon	Mount Lemmon Survey	·	1.6 km	MPC · JPL
711486	2014 OS_{267}	—	February 20, 2012	Haleakala	Pan-STARRS 1	·	2.2 km	MPC · JPL
711487	2014 OH_{269}	—	July 29, 2014	Haleakala	Pan-STARRS 1	EOS	1.3 km	MPC · JPL
711488	2014 OX_{269}	—	July 29, 2014	Haleakala	Pan-STARRS 1	·	2.3 km	MPC · JPL
711489	2014 OX_{271}	—	June 29, 2014	Haleakala	Pan-STARRS 1	EOS	1.6 km	MPC · JPL
711490	2014 OL_{273}	—	July 29, 2014	Haleakala	Pan-STARRS 1	·	2.2 km	MPC · JPL
711491	2014 OW_{273}	—	June 29, 2014	Haleakala	Pan-STARRS 1	·	1.5 km	MPC · JPL
711492	2014 OB_{274}	—	November 25, 2010	Mount Lemmon	Mount Lemmon Survey	·	2.1 km	MPC · JPL
711493	2014 OL_{275}	—	June 27, 2014	Haleakala	Pan-STARRS 1	·	1.1 km	MPC · JPL
711494	2014 OC_{277}	—	January 19, 2012	Mount Lemmon	Mount Lemmon Survey	·	1.6 km	MPC · JPL
711495	2014 OJ_{279}	—	July 29, 2014	Haleakala	Pan-STARRS 1	·	1.7 km	MPC · JPL
711496	2014 OW_{280}	—	June 28, 2014	Haleakala	Pan-STARRS 1	·	1.8 km	MPC · JPL
711497	2014 OH_{281}	—	July 8, 2014	Haleakala	Pan-STARRS 1	EOS	1.2 km	MPC · JPL
711498	2014 OO_{284}	—	July 8, 2014	Haleakala	Pan-STARRS 1	·	1.9 km	MPC · JPL
711499	2014 OG_{285}	—	July 8, 2014	Haleakala	Pan-STARRS 1	·	2.2 km	MPC · JPL
711500	2014 OC_{286}	—	March 31, 2013	Mount Lemmon	Mount Lemmon Survey	·	2.1 km	MPC · JPL

== 711501–711600 ==
back to top

Designation			Discovery			Properties		Ref
Permanent	Provisional	Named after	Date	Site	Discoverer(s)	Category	Diam.	Ref
711501	2014 OR_{286}	—	January 30, 2011	Mount Lemmon	Mount Lemmon Survey	·	2.6 km	MPC · JPL
711502	2014 OX_{290}	—	April 29, 2008	Kitt Peak	Spacewatch	·	1.5 km	MPC · JPL
711503	2014 OK_{291}	—	July 6, 2014	Haleakala	Pan-STARRS 1	·	1.1 km	MPC · JPL
711504	2014 OO_{291}	—	March 7, 2008	Catalina	CSS	·	1.9 km	MPC · JPL
711505	2014 OD_{292}	—	April 14, 2013	Mount Lemmon	Mount Lemmon Survey	GEF	920 m	MPC · JPL
711506	2014 OR_{293}	—	November 25, 2011	Haleakala	Pan-STARRS 1	·	640 m	MPC · JPL
711507	2014 OS_{293}	—	July 29, 2014	Haleakala	Pan-STARRS 1	·	590 m	MPC · JPL
711508	2014 OT_{296}	—	July 29, 2014	Haleakala	Pan-STARRS 1	·	2.4 km	MPC · JPL
711509	2014 OW_{297}	—	May 15, 2013	Haleakala	Pan-STARRS 1	·	2.3 km	MPC · JPL
711510	2014 OL_{304}	—	June 27, 2014	Haleakala	Pan-STARRS 1	NAE	1.3 km	MPC · JPL
711511	2014 OR_{304}	—	October 7, 2005	Mauna Kea	A. Boattini	HYG	2.0 km	MPC · JPL
711512	2014 OE_{309}	—	November 6, 2005	Kitt Peak	Spacewatch	·	1.7 km	MPC · JPL
711513	2014 OP_{314}	—	July 27, 2014	Haleakala	Pan-STARRS 1	·	1.9 km	MPC · JPL
711514	2014 OM_{315}	—	November 20, 2003	Kitt Peak	Deep Ecliptic Survey	·	1.1 km	MPC · JPL
711515	2014 OA_{318}	—	December 25, 2005	Mount Lemmon	Mount Lemmon Survey	·	2.5 km	MPC · JPL
711516	2014 OF_{319}	—	July 29, 2014	Haleakala	Pan-STARRS 1	·	1.5 km	MPC · JPL
711517	2014 OM_{320}	—	October 2, 2006	Mount Lemmon	Mount Lemmon Survey	(12739)	1.3 km	MPC · JPL
711518	2014 OX_{322}	—	July 29, 2014	Haleakala	Pan-STARRS 1	EOS	1.1 km	MPC · JPL
711519	2014 OZ_{323}	—	July 29, 2014	Haleakala	Pan-STARRS 1	·	1.1 km	MPC · JPL
711520	2014 OA_{325}	—	January 18, 2012	Kitt Peak	Spacewatch	·	1.7 km	MPC · JPL
711521	2014 OU_{326}	—	July 29, 2014	Haleakala	Pan-STARRS 1	KOR	1.0 km	MPC · JPL
711522	2014 OB_{331}	—	June 27, 2014	Haleakala	Pan-STARRS 1	·	2.7 km	MPC · JPL
711523	2014 OU_{335}	—	July 30, 2014	Haleakala	Pan-STARRS 1	·	1.6 km	MPC · JPL
711524	2014 OW_{337}	—	July 1, 2014	Haleakala	Pan-STARRS 1	H	360 m	MPC · JPL
711525	2014 OO_{338}	—	June 3, 2014	Haleakala	Pan-STARRS 1	H	410 m	MPC · JPL
711526	2014 OU_{340}	—	October 15, 2004	Mount Lemmon	Mount Lemmon Survey	·	2.0 km	MPC · JPL
711527 Tudor	2014 OH_{345}	Tudor	June 24, 2014	La Palma	EURONEAR	·	1.5 km	MPC · JPL
711528	2014 OS_{349}	—	September 16, 2009	Kitt Peak	Spacewatch	·	1.9 km	MPC · JPL
711529	2014 OJ_{350}	—	June 2, 2014	Mount Lemmon	Mount Lemmon Survey	·	2.8 km	MPC · JPL
711530	2014 OV_{351}	—	June 24, 2014	Mount Lemmon	Mount Lemmon Survey	V	530 m	MPC · JPL
711531	2014 OP_{356}	—	November 20, 2006	Kitt Peak	Spacewatch	·	1.3 km	MPC · JPL
711532	2014 OF_{360}	—	February 28, 2012	Haleakala	Pan-STARRS 1	·	1.9 km	MPC · JPL
711533	2014 ON_{360}	—	July 7, 2014	Haleakala	Pan-STARRS 1	·	1.7 km	MPC · JPL
711534	2014 OR_{361}	—	June 20, 2014	Haleakala	Pan-STARRS 1	·	1.7 km	MPC · JPL
711535	2014 OP_{363}	—	March 27, 2008	Kitt Peak	Spacewatch	·	1.6 km	MPC · JPL
711536	2014 OW_{367}	—	July 4, 2014	Haleakala	Pan-STARRS 1	·	1.2 km	MPC · JPL
711537	2014 OZ_{368}	—	November 13, 2010	Mount Lemmon	Mount Lemmon Survey	·	1.9 km	MPC · JPL
711538	2014 OD_{373}	—	August 23, 2004	Kitt Peak	Spacewatch	·	560 m	MPC · JPL
711539	2014 OT_{374}	—	July 2, 2014	Kitt Peak	Spacewatch	·	1.7 km	MPC · JPL
711540	2014 OY_{375}	—	June 27, 2014	Haleakala	Pan-STARRS 1	·	2.2 km	MPC · JPL
711541	2014 OP_{376}	—	September 3, 2010	Mount Lemmon	Mount Lemmon Survey	·	1.7 km	MPC · JPL
711542	2014 OQ_{378}	—	February 6, 2013	Kitt Peak	Spacewatch	(5)	1.1 km	MPC · JPL
711543	2014 OM_{379}	—	July 26, 2014	Haleakala	Pan-STARRS 1	·	1.7 km	MPC · JPL
711544	2014 OW_{381}	—	January 14, 2002	Kitt Peak	Spacewatch	·	1.8 km	MPC · JPL
711545	2014 OD_{382}	—	September 28, 2001	Palomar	NEAT	·	660 m	MPC · JPL
711546	2014 OX_{383}	—	September 10, 2004	Kitt Peak	Spacewatch	·	1.8 km	MPC · JPL
711547	2014 OM_{384}	—	April 12, 2013	Haleakala	Pan-STARRS 1	·	1.7 km	MPC · JPL
711548	2014 OP_{384}	—	November 27, 2010	Mount Lemmon	Mount Lemmon Survey	DOR	2.2 km	MPC · JPL
711549	2014 OZ_{384}	—	December 15, 2010	Mount Lemmon	Mount Lemmon Survey	·	2.7 km	MPC · JPL
711550	2014 OT_{386}	—	June 2, 2014	Mount Lemmon	Mount Lemmon Survey	·	1.7 km	MPC · JPL
711551	2014 OA_{390}	—	October 30, 2010	Mount Lemmon	Mount Lemmon Survey	EOS	1.8 km	MPC · JPL
711552	2014 OY_{397}	—	July 29, 2014	Haleakala	Pan-STARRS 1	·	1.5 km	MPC · JPL
711553	2014 OE_{399}	—	October 2, 2005	Mount Lemmon	Mount Lemmon Survey	·	1.5 km	MPC · JPL
711554	2014 OE_{401}	—	September 23, 2008	Mount Lemmon	Mount Lemmon Survey	·	540 m	MPC · JPL
711555	2014 OA_{402}	—	July 28, 2014	Haleakala	Pan-STARRS 1	·	1.3 km	MPC · JPL
711556	2014 OL_{402}	—	January 2, 2011	Mount Lemmon	Mount Lemmon Survey	·	2.3 km	MPC · JPL
711557	2014 OP_{402}	—	April 15, 2013	Haleakala	Pan-STARRS 1	·	1.4 km	MPC · JPL
711558	2014 OT_{403}	—	September 25, 2009	Kitt Peak	Spacewatch	·	2.3 km	MPC · JPL
711559	2014 OY_{404}	—	December 26, 2006	Kitt Peak	Spacewatch	·	1.8 km	MPC · JPL
711560	2014 OX_{406}	—	July 25, 2014	Haleakala	Pan-STARRS 1	·	1.6 km	MPC · JPL
711561	2014 OH_{407}	—	December 6, 2010	Mount Lemmon	Mount Lemmon Survey	·	1.8 km	MPC · JPL
711562	2014 OK_{407}	—	July 25, 2014	Haleakala	Pan-STARRS 1	AGN	800 m	MPC · JPL
711563	2014 OJ_{408}	—	February 16, 2012	Haleakala	Pan-STARRS 1	·	1.3 km	MPC · JPL
711564	2014 OL_{408}	—	September 29, 2009	Kitt Peak	Spacewatch	·	1.9 km	MPC · JPL
711565	2014 ON_{408}	—	March 14, 2007	Kitt Peak	Spacewatch	·	2.2 km	MPC · JPL
711566	2014 OQ_{408}	—	January 23, 2006	Mount Lemmon	Mount Lemmon Survey	·	2.1 km	MPC · JPL
711567	2014 OV_{409}	—	December 3, 2010	Mount Lemmon	Mount Lemmon Survey	KOR	1.1 km	MPC · JPL
711568	2014 OY_{411}	—	July 28, 2014	Haleakala	Pan-STARRS 1	VER	2.0 km	MPC · JPL
711569	2014 OE_{412}	—	August 24, 2003	Cerro Tololo	Deep Ecliptic Survey	THM	2.0 km	MPC · JPL
711570	2014 OF_{413}	—	August 29, 2005	Kitt Peak	Spacewatch	·	1.5 km	MPC · JPL
711571	2014 OQ_{413}	—	September 24, 2009	Mount Lemmon	Mount Lemmon Survey	·	2.0 km	MPC · JPL
711572	2014 OH_{414}	—	July 31, 2014	Haleakala	Pan-STARRS 1	EOS	1.2 km	MPC · JPL
711573	2014 ON_{414}	—	July 31, 2014	Haleakala	Pan-STARRS 1	EOS	1.4 km	MPC · JPL
711574	2014 OP_{414}	—	July 31, 2014	Haleakala	Pan-STARRS 1	·	1.7 km	MPC · JPL
711575	2014 OQ_{414}	—	January 30, 2011	Mount Lemmon	Mount Lemmon Survey	EOS	1.7 km	MPC · JPL
711576	2014 OJ_{432}	—	July 25, 2014	Haleakala	Pan-STARRS 1	EOS	1.3 km	MPC · JPL
711577	2014 OK_{432}	—	July 28, 2014	Haleakala	Pan-STARRS 1	·	680 m	MPC · JPL
711578	2014 OK_{434}	—	July 31, 2014	Haleakala	Pan-STARRS 1	·	590 m	MPC · JPL
711579	2014 OB_{447}	—	July 27, 2014	Haleakala	Pan-STARRS 1	·	2.0 km	MPC · JPL
711580	2014 OZ_{450}	—	July 28, 2014	Haleakala	Pan-STARRS 1	·	2.1 km	MPC · JPL
711581	2014 OS_{457}	—	July 30, 2014	Haleakala	Pan-STARRS 1	·	630 m	MPC · JPL
711582	2014 OO_{465}	—	July 28, 2014	Haleakala	Pan-STARRS 1	·	2.2 km	MPC · JPL
711583	2014 OM_{470}	—	July 25, 2014	Haleakala	Pan-STARRS 1	·	1.6 km	MPC · JPL
711584	2014 OD_{478}	—	July 29, 2014	Haleakala	Pan-STARRS 1	EOS	1.3 km	MPC · JPL
711585	2014 OU_{480}	—	July 25, 2014	Haleakala	Pan-STARRS 1	·	2.0 km	MPC · JPL
711586	2014 OE_{481}	—	July 25, 2014	Haleakala	Pan-STARRS 1	·	1.4 km	MPC · JPL
711587	2014 ON_{483}	—	May 2, 2014	Cerro Tololo	DECam	·	1.6 km	MPC · JPL
711588	2014 PD_{3}	—	June 29, 2014	Haleakala	Pan-STARRS 1	615	1.2 km	MPC · JPL
711589	2014 PK_{3}	—	June 24, 2014	Mount Lemmon	Mount Lemmon Survey	EOS	1.6 km	MPC · JPL
711590	2014 PY_{4}	—	July 25, 2014	Haleakala	Pan-STARRS 1	·	1.7 km	MPC · JPL
711591	2014 PA_{5}	—	March 17, 2013	Mount Lemmon	Mount Lemmon Survey	·	1.7 km	MPC · JPL
711592	2014 PF_{7}	—	November 2, 2010	Mount Lemmon	Mount Lemmon Survey	·	1.7 km	MPC · JPL
711593	2014 PF_{10}	—	July 25, 2014	Haleakala	Pan-STARRS 1	·	1.3 km	MPC · JPL
711594	2014 PB_{11}	—	August 4, 2014	Haleakala	Pan-STARRS 1	·	1.3 km	MPC · JPL
711595	2014 PU_{11}	—	October 11, 2004	Kitt Peak	Deep Ecliptic Survey	·	1.3 km	MPC · JPL
711596	2014 PW_{14}	—	December 1, 2005	Kitt Peak	Wasserman, L. H., Millis, R. L.	·	2.4 km	MPC · JPL
711597	2014 PX_{16}	—	January 10, 2006	Mount Lemmon	Mount Lemmon Survey	EOS	1.6 km	MPC · JPL
711598	2014 PA_{18}	—	February 8, 2008	Kitt Peak	Spacewatch	·	1.6 km	MPC · JPL
711599 Kane	2014 PV_{19}	Kane	June 6, 2014	Roque de los Muchachos	EURONEAR	·	950 m	MPC · JPL
711600	2014 PS_{20}	—	February 18, 2010	Mount Lemmon	Mount Lemmon Survey	·	670 m	MPC · JPL

== 711601–711700 ==
back to top

Designation			Discovery			Properties		Ref
Permanent	Provisional	Named after	Date	Site	Discoverer(s)	Category	Diam.	Ref
711601	2014 PD_{22}	—	May 23, 2003	Kitt Peak	Spacewatch	·	1.3 km	MPC · JPL
711602	2014 PH_{23}	—	January 7, 2006	Kitt Peak	Spacewatch	EOS	1.8 km	MPC · JPL
711603	2014 PT_{25}	—	April 17, 2013	Haleakala	Pan-STARRS 1	·	2.3 km	MPC · JPL
711604	2014 PL_{28}	—	October 25, 2011	Haleakala	Pan-STARRS 1	·	630 m	MPC · JPL
711605	2014 PR_{28}	—	June 28, 2014	Haleakala	Pan-STARRS 1	EOS	1.5 km	MPC · JPL
711606	2014 PZ_{30}	—	March 13, 2013	Palomar	Palomar Transient Factory	EUN	1.1 km	MPC · JPL
711607	2014 PH_{31}	—	January 15, 2009	Kitt Peak	Spacewatch	·	560 m	MPC · JPL
711608	2014 PT_{31}	—	March 15, 2007	Altschwendt	W. Ries	·	2.0 km	MPC · JPL
711609	2014 PU_{31}	—	January 9, 2006	Kitt Peak	Spacewatch	·	1.8 km	MPC · JPL
711610	2014 PL_{32}	—	September 25, 2009	Kitt Peak	Spacewatch	·	2.0 km	MPC · JPL
711611	2014 PR_{32}	—	January 6, 2006	Kitt Peak	Spacewatch	·	700 m	MPC · JPL
711612	2014 PT_{32}	—	February 16, 2012	Haleakala	Pan-STARRS 1	·	1.5 km	MPC · JPL
711613	2014 PF_{35}	—	August 28, 2005	Kitt Peak	Spacewatch	·	1.7 km	MPC · JPL
711614	2014 PE_{36}	—	September 27, 2009	Kitt Peak	Spacewatch	THM	2.0 km	MPC · JPL
711615	2014 PK_{38}	—	August 4, 2014	Haleakala	Pan-STARRS 1	·	1.9 km	MPC · JPL
711616	2014 PE_{41}	—	October 11, 2009	Mount Lemmon	Mount Lemmon Survey	·	1.7 km	MPC · JPL
711617	2014 PT_{41}	—	July 28, 2014	Haleakala	Pan-STARRS 1	EOS	1.9 km	MPC · JPL
711618	2014 PV_{41}	—	March 27, 2008	Mount Lemmon	Mount Lemmon Survey	AGN	990 m	MPC · JPL
711619	2014 PM_{43}	—	August 4, 2014	Haleakala	Pan-STARRS 1	·	2.0 km	MPC · JPL
711620	2014 PE_{44}	—	August 4, 2014	Haleakala	Pan-STARRS 1	·	2.4 km	MPC · JPL
711621	2014 PH_{45}	—	October 27, 2005	Mount Lemmon	Mount Lemmon Survey	KOR	1.2 km	MPC · JPL
711622	2014 PJ_{46}	—	December 25, 2010	Mount Lemmon	Mount Lemmon Survey	·	2.9 km	MPC · JPL
711623	2014 PM_{54}	—	June 7, 2013	Haleakala	Pan-STARRS 1	·	2.3 km	MPC · JPL
711624	2014 PN_{55}	—	January 30, 2011	Mount Lemmon	Mount Lemmon Survey	·	3.0 km	MPC · JPL
711625	2014 PR_{55}	—	July 30, 2014	Kitt Peak	Spacewatch	·	540 m	MPC · JPL
711626	2014 PR_{60}	—	May 26, 2014	Haleakala	Pan-STARRS 1	·	1.2 km	MPC · JPL
711627	2014 PH_{61}	—	June 22, 2014	Haleakala	Pan-STARRS 1	·	1.4 km	MPC · JPL
711628	2014 PE_{63}	—	August 8, 2004	Socorro	LINEAR	·	560 m	MPC · JPL
711629	2014 PK_{72}	—	September 16, 2009	Kitt Peak	Spacewatch	·	2.2 km	MPC · JPL
711630	2014 PD_{73}	—	March 27, 2008	Mount Lemmon	Mount Lemmon Survey	·	1.6 km	MPC · JPL
711631	2014 PN_{73}	—	October 11, 2009	Mount Lemmon	Mount Lemmon Survey	THM	2.1 km	MPC · JPL
711632	2014 PQ_{73}	—	August 3, 2014	Haleakala	Pan-STARRS 1	·	1.8 km	MPC · JPL
711633	2014 PU_{73}	—	September 20, 2009	Kitt Peak	Spacewatch	·	2.0 km	MPC · JPL
711634	2014 PB_{74}	—	August 3, 2014	Haleakala	Pan-STARRS 1	·	2.2 km	MPC · JPL
711635	2014 PO_{74}	—	September 20, 2009	Kitt Peak	Spacewatch	·	1.8 km	MPC · JPL
711636	2014 PR_{74}	—	September 18, 2009	Mount Lemmon	Mount Lemmon Survey	·	1.2 km	MPC · JPL
711637	2014 PB_{75}	—	September 19, 2009	Kitt Peak	Spacewatch	THM	2.1 km	MPC · JPL
711638	2014 PQ_{75}	—	August 27, 2009	Kitt Peak	Spacewatch	EOS	1.3 km	MPC · JPL
711639	2014 PP_{76}	—	August 3, 2014	Haleakala	Pan-STARRS 1	EOS	1.3 km	MPC · JPL
711640	2014 PA_{77}	—	August 4, 2014	Haleakala	Pan-STARRS 1	·	1.2 km	MPC · JPL
711641	2014 PF_{78}	—	July 27, 2014	Haleakala	Pan-STARRS 1	·	2.1 km	MPC · JPL
711642	2014 PM_{78}	—	January 10, 2007	Kitt Peak	Spacewatch	·	2.1 km	MPC · JPL
711643	2014 PF_{80}	—	September 4, 2011	Haleakala	Pan-STARRS 1	·	600 m	MPC · JPL
711644	2014 PX_{81}	—	January 19, 2012	Haleakala	Pan-STARRS 1	·	2.7 km	MPC · JPL
711645	2014 PG_{88}	—	August 6, 2014	Kitt Peak	Spacewatch	·	1.7 km	MPC · JPL
711646	2014 PE_{90}	—	August 3, 2014	Haleakala	Pan-STARRS 1	·	1.2 km	MPC · JPL
711647	2014 PW_{104}	—	January 4, 2012	Mount Lemmon	Mount Lemmon Survey	·	1.3 km	MPC · JPL
711648	2014 QE_{4}	—	July 4, 2014	Haleakala	Pan-STARRS 1	BRA	1.3 km	MPC · JPL
711649	2014 QE_{8}	—	March 13, 2012	Mount Lemmon	Mount Lemmon Survey	·	2.0 km	MPC · JPL
711650	2014 QS_{9}	—	March 11, 2008	Mount Lemmon	Mount Lemmon Survey	·	1.7 km	MPC · JPL
711651	2014 QD_{12}	—	July 3, 2014	Haleakala	Pan-STARRS 1	·	2.0 km	MPC · JPL
711652	2014 QL_{14}	—	August 18, 2014	Haleakala	Pan-STARRS 1	·	2.8 km	MPC · JPL
711653	2014 QX_{15}	—	June 29, 2014	Mount Lemmon	Mount Lemmon Survey	EOS	1.9 km	MPC · JPL
711654	2014 QZ_{17}	—	September 21, 2003	Kitt Peak	Spacewatch	·	2.6 km	MPC · JPL
711655	2014 QB_{18}	—	July 27, 2014	Haleakala	Pan-STARRS 1	·	530 m	MPC · JPL
711656	2014 QE_{18}	—	November 18, 2009	Kitt Peak	Spacewatch	·	2.2 km	MPC · JPL
711657	2014 QJ_{18}	—	September 29, 2009	Kitt Peak	Spacewatch	EOS	1.7 km	MPC · JPL
711658	2014 QV_{20}	—	August 18, 2014	Haleakala	Pan-STARRS 1	·	2.2 km	MPC · JPL
711659	2014 QH_{26}	—	August 18, 2014	Haleakala	Pan-STARRS 1	·	610 m	MPC · JPL
711660	2014 QM_{27}	—	August 18, 2014	Haleakala	Pan-STARRS 1	EOS	1.3 km	MPC · JPL
711661	2014 QR_{29}	—	August 18, 2014	Haleakala	Pan-STARRS 1	·	1.9 km	MPC · JPL
711662	2014 QP_{31}	—	August 18, 2014	Haleakala	Pan-STARRS 1	·	2.7 km	MPC · JPL
711663	2014 QV_{34}	—	May 25, 2014	Haleakala	Pan-STARRS 1	·	1.9 km	MPC · JPL
711664	2014 QF_{37}	—	January 3, 2012	Mount Lemmon	Mount Lemmon Survey	·	2.1 km	MPC · JPL
711665	2014 QP_{37}	—	November 13, 2010	Mount Lemmon	Mount Lemmon Survey	·	1.7 km	MPC · JPL
711666	2014 QC_{38}	—	July 1, 2014	Haleakala	Pan-STARRS 1	·	1.6 km	MPC · JPL
711667	2014 QA_{39}	—	August 18, 2014	Haleakala	Pan-STARRS 1	·	2.4 km	MPC · JPL
711668	2014 QO_{40}	—	August 31, 2005	Kitt Peak	Spacewatch	·	1.6 km	MPC · JPL
711669	2014 QF_{44}	—	January 2, 2012	Mount Lemmon	Mount Lemmon Survey	·	2.0 km	MPC · JPL
711670	2014 QN_{44}	—	January 27, 2007	Mount Lemmon	Mount Lemmon Survey	EOS	1.6 km	MPC · JPL
711671	2014 QF_{46}	—	June 25, 2014	Kitt Peak	Spacewatch	BRA	1.5 km	MPC · JPL
711672	2014 QE_{50}	—	April 19, 2013	Haleakala	Pan-STARRS 1	·	2.0 km	MPC · JPL
711673	2014 QJ_{53}	—	March 15, 2013	Kitt Peak	Spacewatch	·	1.6 km	MPC · JPL
711674	2014 QP_{55}	—	December 6, 2010	Mount Lemmon	Mount Lemmon Survey	·	2.6 km	MPC · JPL
711675	2014 QG_{57}	—	August 20, 2014	Haleakala	Pan-STARRS 1	·	580 m	MPC · JPL
711676	2014 QM_{57}	—	April 3, 2008	Kitt Peak	Spacewatch	·	1.7 km	MPC · JPL
711677	2014 QV_{57}	—	September 27, 2006	Kitt Peak	Spacewatch	·	1.4 km	MPC · JPL
711678	2014 QM_{59}	—	April 9, 2013	Haleakala	Pan-STARRS 1	·	1.5 km	MPC · JPL
711679	2014 QY_{60}	—	December 14, 2010	Mount Lemmon	Mount Lemmon Survey	·	1.7 km	MPC · JPL
711680	2014 QJ_{62}	—	February 21, 2007	Mount Lemmon	Mount Lemmon Survey	·	2.0 km	MPC · JPL
711681	2014 QQ_{63}	—	December 17, 2007	Kitt Peak	Spacewatch	·	1.2 km	MPC · JPL
711682	2014 QZ_{66}	—	February 11, 2012	Mount Lemmon	Mount Lemmon Survey	EOS	1.3 km	MPC · JPL
711683	2014 QU_{67}	—	April 12, 2013	Haleakala	Pan-STARRS 1	EOS	1.4 km	MPC · JPL
711684	2014 QR_{71}	—	August 20, 2014	Haleakala	Pan-STARRS 1	·	540 m	MPC · JPL
711685	2014 QG_{72}	—	July 1, 2014	Haleakala	Pan-STARRS 1	·	510 m	MPC · JPL
711686	2014 QA_{73}	—	December 1, 2010	Mount Lemmon	Mount Lemmon Survey	EOS	1.6 km	MPC · JPL
711687	2014 QB_{74}	—	December 6, 2010	Mount Lemmon	Mount Lemmon Survey	EOS	1.3 km	MPC · JPL
711688	2014 QK_{74}	—	September 18, 2010	Mount Lemmon	Mount Lemmon Survey	·	1.8 km	MPC · JPL
711689	2014 QT_{76}	—	August 20, 2014	Haleakala	Pan-STARRS 1	·	1.7 km	MPC · JPL
711690	2014 QC_{77}	—	August 20, 2014	Haleakala	Pan-STARRS 1	·	500 m	MPC · JPL
711691	2014 QL_{77}	—	August 28, 2009	Kitt Peak	Spacewatch	·	2.5 km	MPC · JPL
711692	2014 QO_{81}	—	June 24, 2014	Haleakala	Pan-STARRS 1	·	880 m	MPC · JPL
711693	2014 QV_{83}	—	June 24, 2014	Haleakala	Pan-STARRS 1	EOS	1.7 km	MPC · JPL
711694	2014 QZ_{85}	—	November 20, 2003	Kitt Peak	Deep Ecliptic Survey	·	2.1 km	MPC · JPL
711695	2014 QC_{87}	—	August 20, 2014	Haleakala	Pan-STARRS 1	·	2.5 km	MPC · JPL
711696	2014 QE_{88}	—	November 10, 2010	Mount Lemmon	Mount Lemmon Survey	EOS	1.6 km	MPC · JPL
711697	2014 QJ_{88}	—	August 20, 2014	Haleakala	Pan-STARRS 1	EOS	1.7 km	MPC · JPL
711698	2014 QT_{88}	—	August 20, 2014	Haleakala	Pan-STARRS 1	EOS	1.8 km	MPC · JPL
711699	2014 QV_{88}	—	August 20, 2014	Haleakala	Pan-STARRS 1	NAE	1.6 km	MPC · JPL
711700	2014 QL_{89}	—	August 20, 2014	Haleakala	Pan-STARRS 1	·	1.5 km	MPC · JPL

== 711701–711800 ==
back to top

Designation			Discovery			Properties		Ref
Permanent	Provisional	Named after	Date	Site	Discoverer(s)	Category	Diam.	Ref
711701	2014 QQ_{89}	—	November 26, 2010	Mount Lemmon	Mount Lemmon Survey	·	1.4 km	MPC · JPL
711702	2014 QR_{94}	—	August 6, 2014	Kitt Peak	Spacewatch	·	1.9 km	MPC · JPL
711703	2014 QF_{95}	—	August 20, 2014	Haleakala	Pan-STARRS 1	·	750 m	MPC · JPL
711704	2014 QF_{97}	—	August 20, 2014	Haleakala	Pan-STARRS 1	·	1.3 km	MPC · JPL
711705	2014 QJ_{97}	—	May 12, 2013	Haleakala	Pan-STARRS 1	·	1.8 km	MPC · JPL
711706	2014 QR_{99}	—	February 10, 2008	Kitt Peak	Spacewatch	WIT	830 m	MPC · JPL
711707	2014 QP_{100}	—	October 11, 2010	Mount Lemmon	Mount Lemmon Survey	·	1.4 km	MPC · JPL
711708	2014 QW_{105}	—	November 13, 2010	Mount Lemmon	Mount Lemmon Survey	·	1.6 km	MPC · JPL
711709	2014 QH_{106}	—	August 20, 2014	Haleakala	Pan-STARRS 1	·	530 m	MPC · JPL
711710	2014 QL_{106}	—	August 20, 2014	Haleakala	Pan-STARRS 1	·	1.9 km	MPC · JPL
711711	2014 QL_{109}	—	July 1, 2014	Haleakala	Pan-STARRS 1	NAE	1.8 km	MPC · JPL
711712	2014 QQ_{113}	—	January 25, 2003	Apache Point	SDSS Collaboration	EUN	1.3 km	MPC · JPL
711713	2014 QZ_{114}	—	August 20, 2014	Haleakala	Pan-STARRS 1	SUL	1.6 km	MPC · JPL
711714	2014 QU_{115}	—	February 15, 2012	Haleakala	Pan-STARRS 1	HOF	1.9 km	MPC · JPL
711715	2014 QZ_{116}	—	September 17, 2003	Kitt Peak	Spacewatch	·	2.5 km	MPC · JPL
711716	2014 QC_{117}	—	August 3, 2014	Haleakala	Pan-STARRS 1	EOS	1.6 km	MPC · JPL
711717	2014 QO_{120}	—	March 12, 2007	Kitt Peak	Spacewatch	EOS	1.5 km	MPC · JPL
711718	2014 QH_{122}	—	August 20, 2014	Haleakala	Pan-STARRS 1	·	660 m	MPC · JPL
711719	2014 QG_{124}	—	September 9, 2004	Uccle	P. De Cat, E. W. Elst	·	500 m	MPC · JPL
711720	2014 QN_{124}	—	August 20, 2014	Haleakala	Pan-STARRS 1	·	1.2 km	MPC · JPL
711721	2014 QT_{127}	—	February 25, 2012	Kitt Peak	Spacewatch	EOS	1.4 km	MPC · JPL
711722	2014 QC_{134}	—	April 15, 2013	Haleakala	Pan-STARRS 1	THM	1.8 km	MPC · JPL
711723	2014 QV_{134}	—	August 20, 2014	Haleakala	Pan-STARRS 1	·	2.3 km	MPC · JPL
711724	2014 QL_{138}	—	October 23, 2009	Kitt Peak	Spacewatch	·	2.3 km	MPC · JPL
711725	2014 QH_{142}	—	July 7, 2014	Haleakala	Pan-STARRS 1	·	2.4 km	MPC · JPL
711726	2014 QB_{147}	—	August 20, 2014	Haleakala	Pan-STARRS 1	KOR	970 m	MPC · JPL
711727	2014 QJ_{147}	—	February 16, 2012	Haleakala	Pan-STARRS 1	·	1.3 km	MPC · JPL
711728	2014 QX_{148}	—	March 5, 2012	Kitt Peak	Spacewatch	·	1.8 km	MPC · JPL
711729	2014 QU_{150}	—	August 20, 2014	Haleakala	Pan-STARRS 1	·	700 m	MPC · JPL
711730	2014 QX_{152}	—	February 5, 2011	Haleakala	Pan-STARRS 1	·	2.6 km	MPC · JPL
711731	2014 QT_{155}	—	December 6, 2005	Kitt Peak	Spacewatch	EOS	1.6 km	MPC · JPL
711732	2014 QC_{156}	—	October 13, 2010	Mount Lemmon	Mount Lemmon Survey	·	1.9 km	MPC · JPL
711733	2014 QD_{158}	—	August 9, 2004	Siding Spring	SSS	·	2.7 km	MPC · JPL
711734	2014 QZ_{159}	—	June 29, 2014	Haleakala	Pan-STARRS 1	·	2.4 km	MPC · JPL
711735	2014 QH_{164}	—	June 27, 2014	Haleakala	Pan-STARRS 1	EOS	1.7 km	MPC · JPL
711736	2014 QB_{170}	—	February 15, 2013	Haleakala	Pan-STARRS 1	(1338) (FLO)	530 m	MPC · JPL
711737	2014 QT_{170}	—	September 19, 2009	Kitt Peak	Spacewatch	EOS	1.4 km	MPC · JPL
711738	2014 QM_{171}	—	July 27, 2014	Haleakala	Pan-STARRS 1	·	590 m	MPC · JPL
711739	2014 QP_{171}	—	February 25, 2012	Mount Lemmon	Mount Lemmon Survey	EOS	1.4 km	MPC · JPL
711740	2014 QJ_{172}	—	May 12, 2013	Haleakala	Pan-STARRS 1	EOS	1.2 km	MPC · JPL
711741	2014 QE_{173}	—	August 17, 2009	Kitt Peak	Spacewatch	·	1.3 km	MPC · JPL
711742	2014 QE_{174}	—	February 7, 2013	Kitt Peak	Spacewatch	·	500 m	MPC · JPL
711743	2014 QO_{177}	—	February 28, 2012	Haleakala	Pan-STARRS 1	·	2.0 km	MPC · JPL
711744	2014 QS_{177}	—	April 13, 2013	ESA OGS	ESA OGS	·	2.1 km	MPC · JPL
711745	2014 QM_{178}	—	July 7, 2014	Haleakala	Pan-STARRS 1	·	1.4 km	MPC · JPL
711746	2014 QY_{180}	—	October 25, 2011	Haleakala	Pan-STARRS 1	·	780 m	MPC · JPL
711747	2014 QP_{181}	—	October 26, 2009	Mount Lemmon	Mount Lemmon Survey	·	2.3 km	MPC · JPL
711748	2014 QW_{181}	—	September 30, 2010	Mount Lemmon	Mount Lemmon Survey	·	1.3 km	MPC · JPL
711749	2014 QH_{183}	—	June 24, 2014	Haleakala	Pan-STARRS 1	·	2.5 km	MPC · JPL
711750	2014 QT_{186}	—	August 22, 2014	Haleakala	Pan-STARRS 1	·	1.5 km	MPC · JPL
711751	2014 QW_{189}	—	January 27, 2012	Mount Lemmon	Mount Lemmon Survey	·	2.9 km	MPC · JPL
711752	2014 QM_{190}	—	July 27, 2009	Kitt Peak	Spacewatch	·	2.0 km	MPC · JPL
711753	2014 QN_{190}	—	August 22, 2014	Haleakala	Pan-STARRS 1	·	550 m	MPC · JPL
711754	2014 QU_{190}	—	August 22, 2014	Haleakala	Pan-STARRS 1	·	2.1 km	MPC · JPL
711755	2014 QL_{191}	—	August 22, 2014	Haleakala	Pan-STARRS 1	·	590 m	MPC · JPL
711756	2014 QY_{191}	—	August 27, 2009	Kitt Peak	Spacewatch	EOS	1.4 km	MPC · JPL
711757	2014 QW_{193}	—	April 12, 2013	Haleakala	Pan-STARRS 1	·	2.1 km	MPC · JPL
711758	2014 QH_{195}	—	November 10, 2010	Mount Lemmon	Mount Lemmon Survey	·	1.6 km	MPC · JPL
711759	2014 QJ_{195}	—	September 28, 2009	Kitt Peak	Spacewatch	VER	2.0 km	MPC · JPL
711760	2014 QT_{195}	—	January 20, 2012	Haleakala	Pan-STARRS 1	·	2.3 km	MPC · JPL
711761	2014 QY_{196}	—	August 22, 2014	Haleakala	Pan-STARRS 1	·	1.5 km	MPC · JPL
711762	2014 QZ_{198}	—	January 13, 2011	Kitt Peak	Spacewatch	·	2.6 km	MPC · JPL
711763	2014 QS_{199}	—	August 22, 2014	Haleakala	Pan-STARRS 1	·	1.3 km	MPC · JPL
711764	2014 QF_{201}	—	August 22, 2014	Haleakala	Pan-STARRS 1	HOF	2.1 km	MPC · JPL
711765	2014 QJ_{210}	—	February 23, 2012	Mount Lemmon	Mount Lemmon Survey	·	1.9 km	MPC · JPL
711766	2014 QR_{210}	—	November 12, 2010	Mount Lemmon	Mount Lemmon Survey	AGN	910 m	MPC · JPL
711767	2014 QZ_{210}	—	February 13, 2011	Mount Lemmon	Mount Lemmon Survey	·	2.4 km	MPC · JPL
711768	2014 QC_{211}	—	July 30, 2014	Kitt Peak	Spacewatch	·	1.7 km	MPC · JPL
711769	2014 QA_{212}	—	October 15, 2004	Mount Lemmon	Mount Lemmon Survey	·	1.9 km	MPC · JPL
711770	2014 QS_{212}	—	March 13, 2007	Mount Lemmon	Mount Lemmon Survey	·	2.2 km	MPC · JPL
711771	2014 QG_{213}	—	April 27, 2006	Cerro Tololo	Deep Ecliptic Survey	·	2.0 km	MPC · JPL
711772	2014 QH_{216}	—	August 25, 2004	Kitt Peak	Spacewatch	·	470 m	MPC · JPL
711773	2014 QU_{218}	—	August 22, 2014	Haleakala	Pan-STARRS 1	·	1.2 km	MPC · JPL
711774	2014 QS_{223}	—	March 14, 2012	Mount Lemmon	Mount Lemmon Survey	VER	2.1 km	MPC · JPL
711775	2014 QU_{223}	—	August 22, 2014	Haleakala	Pan-STARRS 1	·	1.9 km	MPC · JPL
711776	2014 QG_{225}	—	August 22, 2014	Haleakala	Pan-STARRS 1	KOR	980 m	MPC · JPL
711777	2014 QJ_{225}	—	August 22, 2014	Haleakala	Pan-STARRS 1	·	1.5 km	MPC · JPL
711778	2014 QS_{229}	—	August 20, 2014	Haleakala	Pan-STARRS 1	AGN	900 m	MPC · JPL
711779	2014 QQ_{231}	—	December 1, 2003	Kitt Peak	Spacewatch	·	2.5 km	MPC · JPL
711780	2014 QO_{232}	—	August 3, 2014	Haleakala	Pan-STARRS 1	·	1.6 km	MPC · JPL
711781	2014 QL_{233}	—	September 11, 2010	Kitt Peak	Spacewatch	·	880 m	MPC · JPL
711782	2014 QC_{234}	—	September 26, 2005	Kitt Peak	Spacewatch	GEF	970 m	MPC · JPL
711783	2014 QA_{235}	—	August 22, 2014	Haleakala	Pan-STARRS 1	THM	1.6 km	MPC · JPL
711784	2014 QW_{235}	—	December 3, 2010	Mount Lemmon	Mount Lemmon Survey	KOR	1.2 km	MPC · JPL
711785	2014 QQ_{236}	—	September 15, 2009	Kitt Peak	Spacewatch	·	1.6 km	MPC · JPL
711786	2014 QK_{239}	—	February 16, 2012	Haleakala	Pan-STARRS 1	PAD	1.4 km	MPC · JPL
711787	2014 QO_{244}	—	August 22, 2014	Haleakala	Pan-STARRS 1	·	1.6 km	MPC · JPL
711788	2014 QU_{244}	—	October 7, 2005	Mauna Kea	A. Boattini	·	2.6 km	MPC · JPL
711789	2014 QY_{245}	—	July 7, 2014	Haleakala	Pan-STARRS 1	·	2.4 km	MPC · JPL
711790	2014 QX_{249}	—	August 22, 2014	Haleakala	Pan-STARRS 1	EOS	1.3 km	MPC · JPL
711791	2014 QO_{250}	—	February 24, 2012	Mount Lemmon	Mount Lemmon Survey	·	2.2 km	MPC · JPL
711792	2014 QF_{251}	—	October 12, 1999	Kitt Peak	Spacewatch	·	1.3 km	MPC · JPL
711793	2014 QY_{251}	—	August 22, 2014	Haleakala	Pan-STARRS 1	·	3.2 km	MPC · JPL
711794	2014 QQ_{252}	—	August 22, 2014	Haleakala	Pan-STARRS 1	·	2.1 km	MPC · JPL
711795	2014 QJ_{253}	—	April 19, 2013	Haleakala	Pan-STARRS 1	·	1.6 km	MPC · JPL
711796	2014 QR_{253}	—	August 22, 2014	Haleakala	Pan-STARRS 1	·	810 m	MPC · JPL
711797	2014 QE_{254}	—	September 27, 2003	Apache Point	SDSS Collaboration	·	2.5 km	MPC · JPL
711798	2014 QV_{254}	—	August 22, 2014	Haleakala	Pan-STARRS 1	EOS	1.7 km	MPC · JPL
711799	2014 QG_{255}	—	August 22, 2014	Haleakala	Pan-STARRS 1	EOS	1.3 km	MPC · JPL
711800	2014 QK_{256}	—	August 22, 2014	Haleakala	Pan-STARRS 1	EOS	1.7 km	MPC · JPL

== 711801–711900 ==
back to top

Designation			Discovery			Properties		Ref
Permanent	Provisional	Named after	Date	Site	Discoverer(s)	Category	Diam.	Ref
711801	2014 QO_{256}	—	February 7, 2011	Mount Lemmon	Mount Lemmon Survey	·	2.9 km	MPC · JPL
711802	2014 QD_{257}	—	August 22, 2014	Haleakala	Pan-STARRS 1	EOS	2.0 km	MPC · JPL
711803	2014 QY_{257}	—	August 22, 2014	Haleakala	Pan-STARRS 1	·	1.9 km	MPC · JPL
711804	2014 QZ_{257}	—	August 22, 2014	Haleakala	Pan-STARRS 1	·	2.5 km	MPC · JPL
711805	2014 QV_{258}	—	April 20, 2013	Mount Lemmon	Mount Lemmon Survey	·	1.4 km	MPC · JPL
711806	2014 QU_{259}	—	January 8, 2011	Mount Lemmon	Mount Lemmon Survey	EOS	1.5 km	MPC · JPL
711807	2014 QO_{260}	—	August 22, 2014	Haleakala	Pan-STARRS 1	·	2.0 km	MPC · JPL
711808	2014 QO_{261}	—	October 18, 2009	Mount Lemmon	Mount Lemmon Survey	·	2.9 km	MPC · JPL
711809	2014 QK_{263}	—	July 31, 2014	Haleakala	Pan-STARRS 1	·	1.8 km	MPC · JPL
711810	2014 QY_{263}	—	September 27, 2009	Kitt Peak	Spacewatch	·	2.9 km	MPC · JPL
711811	2014 QP_{267}	—	July 10, 2014	Haleakala	Pan-STARRS 1	·	680 m	MPC · JPL
711812	2014 QP_{268}	—	December 27, 2005	Kitt Peak	Spacewatch	·	1.8 km	MPC · JPL
711813	2014 QA_{269}	—	July 26, 2014	ESA OGS	ESA OGS	TEL	1.1 km	MPC · JPL
711814	2014 QS_{272}	—	August 28, 2009	Kitt Peak	Spacewatch	·	2.2 km	MPC · JPL
711815	2014 QC_{273}	—	August 22, 2014	Haleakala	Pan-STARRS 1	·	2.7 km	MPC · JPL
711816	2014 QU_{273}	—	November 30, 2005	Kitt Peak	Spacewatch	EOS	1.5 km	MPC · JPL
711817	2014 QV_{274}	—	August 23, 2014	Haleakala	Pan-STARRS 1	EOS	1.6 km	MPC · JPL
711818	2014 QE_{275}	—	August 24, 2014	Kitt Peak	Spacewatch	·	2.2 km	MPC · JPL
711819	2014 QR_{275}	—	August 24, 2014	Kitt Peak	Spacewatch	·	3.1 km	MPC · JPL
711820	2014 QK_{276}	—	June 27, 2014	Haleakala	Pan-STARRS 1	·	2.1 km	MPC · JPL
711821	2014 QL_{276}	—	March 15, 2013	Kitt Peak	Spacewatch	·	1.7 km	MPC · JPL
711822	2014 QF_{277}	—	February 14, 2002	Kitt Peak	Spacewatch	·	1.8 km	MPC · JPL
711823	2014 QC_{279}	—	December 24, 2005	Kitt Peak	Spacewatch	·	1.9 km	MPC · JPL
711824 Infante	2014 QM_{279}	Infante	August 29, 2003	Mauna Kea	D. D. Balam	·	2.9 km	MPC · JPL
711825	2014 QM_{280}	—	August 29, 2005	Palomar	NEAT	·	2.2 km	MPC · JPL
711826	2014 QB_{283}	—	July 9, 2010	WISE	WISE	JUN	2.9 km	MPC · JPL
711827	2014 QE_{287}	—	November 3, 2010	Mount Lemmon	Mount Lemmon Survey	·	1.8 km	MPC · JPL
711828	2014 QL_{288}	—	May 6, 2008	Kitt Peak	Spacewatch	·	1.9 km	MPC · JPL
711829	2014 QS_{288}	—	October 21, 2003	Kitt Peak	Spacewatch	·	2.6 km	MPC · JPL
711830	2014 QM_{291}	—	November 6, 2010	Mount Lemmon	Mount Lemmon Survey	·	1.6 km	MPC · JPL
711831	2014 QN_{291}	—	August 25, 2014	Haleakala	Pan-STARRS 1	·	2.0 km	MPC · JPL
711832	2014 QC_{292}	—	November 8, 2009	Mount Lemmon	Mount Lemmon Survey	·	2.5 km	MPC · JPL
711833	2014 QF_{292}	—	August 25, 2014	Haleakala	Pan-STARRS 1	·	2.2 km	MPC · JPL
711834	2014 QF_{295}	—	February 20, 2012	Haleakala	Pan-STARRS 1	·	1.9 km	MPC · JPL
711835	2014 QB_{297}	—	March 16, 2007	Kitt Peak	Spacewatch	·	2.8 km	MPC · JPL
711836	2014 QW_{297}	—	October 12, 2010	Mount Lemmon	Mount Lemmon Survey	HOF	2.0 km	MPC · JPL
711837	2014 QC_{298}	—	February 16, 2012	Haleakala	Pan-STARRS 1	·	2.4 km	MPC · JPL
711838	2014 QL_{300}	—	July 7, 2014	Haleakala	Pan-STARRS 1	·	660 m	MPC · JPL
711839	2014 QB_{303}	—	June 24, 2014	Haleakala	Pan-STARRS 1	·	1.6 km	MPC · JPL
711840	2014 QM_{304}	—	November 2, 2010	Mount Lemmon	Mount Lemmon Survey	·	1.2 km	MPC · JPL
711841	2014 QV_{304}	—	August 23, 2014	Oukaïmeden	C. Rinner	·	2.3 km	MPC · JPL
711842	2014 QA_{305}	—	October 28, 2010	Mount Lemmon	Mount Lemmon Survey	·	1.6 km	MPC · JPL
711843	2014 QS_{306}	—	November 17, 2009	Kitt Peak	Spacewatch	HYG	2.0 km	MPC · JPL
711844	2014 QX_{306}	—	April 5, 2008	Mount Lemmon	Mount Lemmon Survey	AGN	1.0 km	MPC · JPL
711845	2014 QT_{315}	—	March 14, 2010	Kitt Peak	Spacewatch	·	560 m	MPC · JPL
711846	2014 QL_{317}	—	April 13, 2013	ESA OGS	ESA OGS	·	2.1 km	MPC · JPL
711847	2014 QE_{318}	—	March 4, 2008	Mount Lemmon	Mount Lemmon Survey	·	1.6 km	MPC · JPL
711848	2014 QT_{319}	—	October 10, 2001	Kitt Peak	Spacewatch	·	520 m	MPC · JPL
711849	2014 QV_{321}	—	February 28, 2012	Haleakala	Pan-STARRS 1	EOS	1.4 km	MPC · JPL
711850	2014 QH_{322}	—	February 26, 2012	Mount Lemmon	Mount Lemmon Survey	·	2.4 km	MPC · JPL
711851	2014 QO_{323}	—	August 25, 2014	Haleakala	Pan-STARRS 1	·	2.0 km	MPC · JPL
711852	2014 QS_{324}	—	August 25, 2014	Haleakala	Pan-STARRS 1	EOS	1.4 km	MPC · JPL
711853	2014 QX_{325}	—	February 26, 2012	Kitt Peak	Spacewatch	·	2.3 km	MPC · JPL
711854	2014 QH_{328}	—	September 20, 2003	Campo Imperatore	CINEOS	·	2.4 km	MPC · JPL
711855	2014 QE_{332}	—	December 20, 2007	Kitt Peak	Spacewatch	·	1.1 km	MPC · JPL
711856	2014 QS_{333}	—	April 15, 2013	Haleakala	Pan-STARRS 1	·	1.6 km	MPC · JPL
711857	2014 QG_{334}	—	August 25, 2014	Haleakala	Pan-STARRS 1	·	1.9 km	MPC · JPL
711858	2014 QU_{334}	—	November 10, 2004	Kitt Peak	Spacewatch	·	630 m	MPC · JPL
711859	2014 QP_{335}	—	August 25, 2014	Haleakala	Pan-STARRS 1	·	900 m	MPC · JPL
711860	2014 QQ_{339}	—	July 18, 2007	Mount Lemmon	Mount Lemmon Survey	·	720 m	MPC · JPL
711861	2014 QD_{340}	—	January 2, 2009	Mount Lemmon	Mount Lemmon Survey	·	600 m	MPC · JPL
711862	2014 QU_{342}	—	August 26, 2014	Haleakala	Pan-STARRS 1	EOS	1.4 km	MPC · JPL
711863	2014 QY_{342}	—	August 3, 2014	Haleakala	Pan-STARRS 1	·	1.2 km	MPC · JPL
711864	2014 QM_{343}	—	September 9, 2004	Kitt Peak	Spacewatch	·	1.4 km	MPC · JPL
711865	2014 QX_{343}	—	December 6, 2010	Mount Lemmon	Mount Lemmon Survey	·	1.3 km	MPC · JPL
711866	2014 QD_{347}	—	December 5, 1999	Kitt Peak	Spacewatch	·	1.7 km	MPC · JPL
711867	2014 QR_{347}	—	August 26, 2014	Haleakala	Pan-STARRS 1	·	1.7 km	MPC · JPL
711868	2014 QD_{352}	—	October 19, 2011	Kitt Peak	Spacewatch	·	600 m	MPC · JPL
711869	2014 QR_{354}	—	August 26, 1998	Kitt Peak	Spacewatch	·	2.0 km	MPC · JPL
711870	2014 QG_{355}	—	August 27, 2014	Haleakala	Pan-STARRS 1	·	2.4 km	MPC · JPL
711871	2014 QP_{355}	—	February 10, 2011	Mount Lemmon	Mount Lemmon Survey	·	1.8 km	MPC · JPL
711872	2014 QA_{356}	—	September 25, 2009	Kitt Peak	Spacewatch	·	1.7 km	MPC · JPL
711873	2014 QC_{356}	—	August 27, 2014	Haleakala	Pan-STARRS 1	·	1.6 km	MPC · JPL
711874	2014 QZ_{356}	—	September 16, 2009	Kitt Peak	Spacewatch	·	2.3 km	MPC · JPL
711875	2014 QK_{361}	—	August 27, 2014	Haleakala	Pan-STARRS 1	·	1.8 km	MPC · JPL
711876	2014 QV_{361}	—	January 22, 2012	Haleakala	Pan-STARRS 1	·	2.2 km	MPC · JPL
711877	2014 QW_{361}	—	August 27, 2014	Haleakala	Pan-STARRS 1	·	3.5 km	MPC · JPL
711878	2014 QN_{372}	—	April 15, 2013	Haleakala	Pan-STARRS 1	·	1.6 km	MPC · JPL
711879	2014 QK_{374}	—	January 13, 2011	Kitt Peak	Spacewatch	VER	2.4 km	MPC · JPL
711880	2014 QL_{375}	—	August 20, 2014	Haleakala	Pan-STARRS 1	·	560 m	MPC · JPL
711881	2014 QV_{377}	—	February 8, 2002	Kitt Peak	Deep Ecliptic Survey	·	1.7 km	MPC · JPL
711882	2014 QZ_{379}	—	July 30, 2014	Haleakala	Pan-STARRS 1	·	1.9 km	MPC · JPL
711883	2014 QD_{380}	—	May 3, 2010	Kitt Peak	Spacewatch	·	670 m	MPC · JPL
711884	2014 QK_{382}	—	September 17, 2009	Kitt Peak	Spacewatch	·	1.8 km	MPC · JPL
711885	2014 QO_{382}	—	September 9, 2007	Kitt Peak	Spacewatch	(2076)	700 m	MPC · JPL
711886	2014 QS_{385}	—	January 30, 2011	Haleakala	Pan-STARRS 1	EOS	2.0 km	MPC · JPL
711887	2014 QA_{386}	—	February 4, 2005	Mount Lemmon	Mount Lemmon Survey	·	2.3 km	MPC · JPL
711888	2014 QE_{386}	—	August 29, 2014	Mount Lemmon	Mount Lemmon Survey	EOS	1.4 km	MPC · JPL
711889	2014 QM_{388}	—	August 20, 2014	Haleakala	Pan-STARRS 1	·	1.3 km	MPC · JPL
711890	2014 QA_{392}	—	April 27, 2012	Haleakala	Pan-STARRS 1	·	3.5 km	MPC · JPL
711891	2014 QE_{392}	—	September 19, 1998	Apache Point	SDSS Collaboration	·	2.7 km	MPC · JPL
711892	2014 QE_{395}	—	March 28, 2012	Mount Lemmon	Mount Lemmon Survey	·	2.4 km	MPC · JPL
711893	2014 QT_{396}	—	September 5, 2008	Kitt Peak	Spacewatch	·	2.8 km	MPC · JPL
711894	2014 QP_{399}	—	September 17, 2009	Kitt Peak	Spacewatch	EOS	1.5 km	MPC · JPL
711895	2014 QQ_{399}	—	August 19, 2014	Haleakala	Pan-STARRS 1	·	1.7 km	MPC · JPL
711896	2014 QQ_{400}	—	July 28, 2014	Haleakala	Pan-STARRS 1	EOS	1.4 km	MPC · JPL
711897	2014 QP_{403}	—	August 28, 2014	Haleakala	Pan-STARRS 1	EOS	1.7 km	MPC · JPL
711898	2014 QZ_{403}	—	September 16, 2003	Palomar	NEAT	·	1.2 km	MPC · JPL
711899	2014 QJ_{404}	—	October 24, 2004	Kitt Peak	Spacewatch	·	760 m	MPC · JPL
711900	2014 QK_{405}	—	August 28, 2014	Haleakala	Pan-STARRS 1	·	2.6 km	MPC · JPL

== 711901–712000 ==
back to top

Designation			Discovery			Properties		Ref
Permanent	Provisional	Named after	Date	Site	Discoverer(s)	Category	Diam.	Ref
711901	2014 QX_{407}	—	May 13, 2008	Siding Spring	SSS	·	3.6 km	MPC · JPL
711902	2014 QP_{409}	—	August 20, 2014	Haleakala	Pan-STARRS 1	·	2.4 km	MPC · JPL
711903	2014 QL_{411}	—	January 1, 2012	Mount Lemmon	Mount Lemmon Survey	·	640 m	MPC · JPL
711904	2014 QV_{413}	—	August 21, 2004	Catalina	CSS	·	440 m	MPC · JPL
711905	2014 QG_{416}	—	September 27, 2003	Kitt Peak	Spacewatch	·	1.1 km	MPC · JPL
711906	2014 QP_{416}	—	October 7, 2005	Kitt Peak	Spacewatch	·	1.5 km	MPC · JPL
711907	2014 QF_{417}	—	September 30, 2009	Mount Lemmon	Mount Lemmon Survey	·	2.1 km	MPC · JPL
711908	2014 QR_{417}	—	August 30, 2014	Kitt Peak	Spacewatch	·	710 m	MPC · JPL
711909	2014 QC_{418}	—	November 11, 2009	Kitt Peak	Spacewatch	·	2.2 km	MPC · JPL
711910	2014 QO_{418}	—	August 30, 2014	Kitt Peak	Spacewatch	·	510 m	MPC · JPL
711911	2014 QH_{420}	—	July 31, 2014	Haleakala	Pan-STARRS 1	·	1.7 km	MPC · JPL
711912	2014 QN_{420}	—	August 23, 2014	Haleakala	Pan-STARRS 1	·	2.0 km	MPC · JPL
711913	2014 QL_{423}	—	February 21, 2012	Oukaïmeden	M. Ory	·	1.6 km	MPC · JPL
711914	2014 QF_{428}	—	June 21, 2007	Mount Lemmon	Mount Lemmon Survey	·	800 m	MPC · JPL
711915	2014 QP_{429}	—	January 27, 2011	Kitt Peak	Spacewatch	EOS	1.7 km	MPC · JPL
711916	2014 QA_{430}	—	September 15, 2009	Kitt Peak	Spacewatch	EOS	1.6 km	MPC · JPL
711917	2014 QT_{431}	—	April 18, 2007	Mount Lemmon	Mount Lemmon Survey	·	2.3 km	MPC · JPL
711918	2014 QG_{435}	—	August 28, 2014	Haleakala	Pan-STARRS 1	EOS	1.6 km	MPC · JPL
711919	2014 QM_{438}	—	August 31, 2014	Haleakala	Pan-STARRS 1	L5	8.2 km	MPC · JPL
711920	2014 QF_{445}	—	February 13, 2008	Kitt Peak	Spacewatch	·	1.4 km	MPC · JPL
711921	2014 QA_{448}	—	March 27, 2008	Mount Lemmon	Mount Lemmon Survey	·	1.4 km	MPC · JPL
711922	2014 QV_{448}	—	August 18, 2014	Haleakala	Pan-STARRS 1	·	2.3 km	MPC · JPL
711923	2014 QE_{449}	—	March 28, 2012	Mount Lemmon	Mount Lemmon Survey	·	1.6 km	MPC · JPL
711924	2014 QK_{449}	—	April 11, 2008	Kitt Peak	Spacewatch	·	1.8 km	MPC · JPL
711925	2014 QM_{449}	—	March 28, 2012	Mount Lemmon	Mount Lemmon Survey	·	1.8 km	MPC · JPL
711926	2014 QS_{450}	—	August 22, 2014	Haleakala	Pan-STARRS 1	EOS	1.4 km	MPC · JPL
711927	2014 QB_{451}	—	August 27, 2014	Haleakala	Pan-STARRS 1	·	2.2 km	MPC · JPL
711928	2014 QE_{451}	—	September 23, 2009	Mount Lemmon	Mount Lemmon Survey	EOS	1.5 km	MPC · JPL
711929	2014 QF_{451}	—	August 28, 2014	Haleakala	Pan-STARRS 1	·	2.2 km	MPC · JPL
711930	2014 QW_{452}	—	July 30, 2008	Mount Lemmon	Mount Lemmon Survey	EOS	1.9 km	MPC · JPL
711931	2014 QJ_{453}	—	August 20, 2014	Haleakala	Pan-STARRS 1	·	2.0 km	MPC · JPL
711932	2014 QL_{453}	—	August 20, 2014	Haleakala	Pan-STARRS 1	EOS	1.4 km	MPC · JPL
711933	2014 QO_{453}	—	February 22, 2009	Mount Lemmon	Mount Lemmon Survey	·	760 m	MPC · JPL
711934	2014 QV_{453}	—	August 23, 2014	Haleakala	Pan-STARRS 1	·	1.7 km	MPC · JPL
711935	2014 QB_{454}	—	March 13, 2012	Kitt Peak	Spacewatch	·	2.0 km	MPC · JPL
711936	2014 QF_{454}	—	August 27, 2014	Haleakala	Pan-STARRS 1	·	1.2 km	MPC · JPL
711937	2014 QK_{455}	—	September 27, 2009	Mount Lemmon	Mount Lemmon Survey	·	1.9 km	MPC · JPL
711938	2014 QS_{455}	—	November 8, 2009	Mount Lemmon	Mount Lemmon Survey	·	1.9 km	MPC · JPL
711939	2014 QV_{456}	—	October 19, 2003	Kitt Peak	Spacewatch	THM	1.7 km	MPC · JPL
711940	2014 QX_{456}	—	August 20, 2014	Haleakala	Pan-STARRS 1	·	1.7 km	MPC · JPL
711941	2014 QA_{457}	—	September 30, 2003	Kitt Peak	Spacewatch	·	2.9 km	MPC · JPL
711942	2014 QW_{457}	—	February 21, 2006	Mount Lemmon	Mount Lemmon Survey	·	2.1 km	MPC · JPL
711943	2014 QC_{458}	—	May 29, 2012	Mount Lemmon	Mount Lemmon Survey	·	2.9 km	MPC · JPL
711944	2014 QL_{458}	—	December 14, 2010	Mount Lemmon	Mount Lemmon Survey	·	1.6 km	MPC · JPL
711945	2014 QZ_{458}	—	March 24, 2012	Mount Lemmon	Mount Lemmon Survey	·	2.2 km	MPC · JPL
711946	2014 QS_{459}	—	September 29, 2003	Kitt Peak	Spacewatch	·	880 m	MPC · JPL
711947	2014 QF_{460}	—	August 20, 2014	Haleakala	Pan-STARRS 1	·	1.3 km	MPC · JPL
711948	2014 QT_{461}	—	August 20, 2014	Haleakala	Pan-STARRS 1	·	2.4 km	MPC · JPL
711949	2014 QZ_{461}	—	November 8, 2009	Kitt Peak	Spacewatch	·	2.9 km	MPC · JPL
711950	2014 QE_{462}	—	January 30, 2011	Haleakala	Pan-STARRS 1	·	2.4 km	MPC · JPL
711951	2014 QH_{462}	—	February 14, 2012	Haleakala	Pan-STARRS 1	KOR	1.1 km	MPC · JPL
711952	2014 QR_{462}	—	January 29, 2012	Kitt Peak	Spacewatch	·	1.4 km	MPC · JPL
711953	2014 QZ_{462}	—	September 12, 2009	Kitt Peak	Spacewatch	·	1.5 km	MPC · JPL
711954	2014 QC_{463}	—	August 22, 2014	Haleakala	Pan-STARRS 1	VER	2.0 km	MPC · JPL
711955	2014 QK_{463}	—	September 27, 2009	Kitt Peak	Spacewatch	EOS	1.4 km	MPC · JPL
711956	2014 QX_{463}	—	January 4, 2011	Mount Lemmon	Mount Lemmon Survey	·	2.5 km	MPC · JPL
711957	2014 QA_{464}	—	August 22, 2014	Haleakala	Pan-STARRS 1	EUN	1.4 km	MPC · JPL
711958	2014 QS_{464}	—	September 29, 2009	Mount Lemmon	Mount Lemmon Survey	·	1.9 km	MPC · JPL
711959	2014 QU_{464}	—	October 11, 2004	Kitt Peak	Deep Ecliptic Survey	·	1.4 km	MPC · JPL
711960	2014 QK_{465}	—	August 23, 2014	Haleakala	Pan-STARRS 1	·	2.1 km	MPC · JPL
711961	2014 QQ_{465}	—	July 1, 2013	Haleakala	Pan-STARRS 1	·	2.6 km	MPC · JPL
711962	2014 QC_{466}	—	August 25, 2014	Haleakala	Pan-STARRS 1	·	2.6 km	MPC · JPL
711963	2014 QL_{466}	—	August 25, 2014	Haleakala	Pan-STARRS 1	·	2.3 km	MPC · JPL
711964	2014 QP_{466}	—	August 25, 2014	Haleakala	Pan-STARRS 1	EOS	1.6 km	MPC · JPL
711965	2014 QN_{468}	—	August 27, 2014	Haleakala	Pan-STARRS 1	·	2.2 km	MPC · JPL
711966	2014 QS_{469}	—	April 7, 2013	Mount Lemmon	Mount Lemmon Survey	·	1.4 km	MPC · JPL
711967	2014 QM_{470}	—	August 28, 2014	Haleakala	Pan-STARRS 1	EOS	1.6 km	MPC · JPL
711968	2014 QC_{471}	—	August 28, 2014	Haleakala	Pan-STARRS 1	EOS	1.6 km	MPC · JPL
711969	2014 QA_{472}	—	August 30, 2014	Haleakala	Pan-STARRS 1	·	2.3 km	MPC · JPL
711970	2014 QQ_{472}	—	August 31, 2014	Haleakala	Pan-STARRS 1	·	1.9 km	MPC · JPL
711971	2014 QF_{474}	—	August 31, 2014	Haleakala	Pan-STARRS 1	EOS	1.5 km	MPC · JPL
711972	2014 QH_{474}	—	May 26, 2006	Mount Lemmon	Mount Lemmon Survey	·	2.6 km	MPC · JPL
711973	2014 QP_{474}	—	August 31, 2014	Haleakala	Pan-STARRS 1	·	1.8 km	MPC · JPL
711974	2014 QN_{475}	—	September 10, 2009	ESA OGS	ESA OGS	·	2.2 km	MPC · JPL
711975	2014 QX_{476}	—	January 27, 2011	Mount Lemmon	Mount Lemmon Survey	VER	2.4 km	MPC · JPL
711976	2014 QD_{478}	—	September 21, 2009	Mount Lemmon	Mount Lemmon Survey	·	2.2 km	MPC · JPL
711977	2014 QR_{478}	—	August 20, 2014	Haleakala	Pan-STARRS 1	·	1.4 km	MPC · JPL
711978	2014 QC_{479}	—	July 25, 2014	Haleakala	Pan-STARRS 1	·	1.9 km	MPC · JPL
711979	2014 QE_{480}	—	May 24, 2006	Mount Lemmon	Mount Lemmon Survey	·	1.1 km	MPC · JPL
711980	2014 QD_{481}	—	January 19, 2012	Haleakala	Pan-STARRS 1	·	1.6 km	MPC · JPL
711981	2014 QU_{481}	—	March 5, 2002	Kitt Peak	Spacewatch	·	1.6 km	MPC · JPL
711982	2014 QR_{482}	—	August 20, 2014	Haleakala	Pan-STARRS 1	·	560 m	MPC · JPL
711983	2014 QL_{483}	—	September 16, 2003	Kitt Peak	Spacewatch	·	3.3 km	MPC · JPL
711984	2014 QR_{483}	—	April 7, 2013	Kitt Peak	Spacewatch	·	2.2 km	MPC · JPL
711985	2014 QV_{483}	—	October 23, 2011	Mount Lemmon	Mount Lemmon Survey	·	540 m	MPC · JPL
711986	2014 QP_{485}	—	September 18, 2009	Kitt Peak	Spacewatch	·	1.9 km	MPC · JPL
711987	2014 QJ_{488}	—	September 23, 2011	Kitt Peak	Spacewatch	·	700 m	MPC · JPL
711988	2014 QG_{489}	—	April 15, 2007	Kitt Peak	Spacewatch	·	2.0 km	MPC · JPL
711989	2014 QB_{490}	—	June 4, 2013	Mount Lemmon	Mount Lemmon Survey	EOS	1.5 km	MPC · JPL
711990	2014 QS_{491}	—	September 28, 2003	Kitt Peak	Spacewatch	THM	2.0 km	MPC · JPL
711991	2014 QV_{491}	—	March 1, 2012	Mount Lemmon	Mount Lemmon Survey	·	2.4 km	MPC · JPL
711992	2014 QH_{494}	—	August 17, 2009	Kitt Peak	Spacewatch	·	1.4 km	MPC · JPL
711993	2014 QG_{496}	—	August 28, 2014	Haleakala	Pan-STARRS 1	EOS	1.6 km	MPC · JPL
711994	2014 QJ_{496}	—	August 28, 2014	Haleakala	Pan-STARRS 1	·	2.1 km	MPC · JPL
711995	2014 QH_{499}	—	August 27, 2014	Haleakala	Pan-STARRS 1	·	2.9 km	MPC · JPL
711996	2014 QJ_{500}	—	August 18, 2014	Haleakala	Pan-STARRS 1	·	2.6 km	MPC · JPL
711997	2014 QM_{504}	—	August 28, 2014	Haleakala	Pan-STARRS 1	·	1.8 km	MPC · JPL
711998	2014 QH_{505}	—	August 18, 2014	Haleakala	Pan-STARRS 1	·	1.6 km	MPC · JPL
711999	2014 QO_{505}	—	August 20, 2014	Haleakala	Pan-STARRS 1	·	1.8 km	MPC · JPL
712000	2014 QW_{505}	—	August 28, 2014	Kitt Peak	Spacewatch	·	490 m	MPC · JPL

back to top

== Meaning of names ==
As minor planet discoveries are confirmed, they are given a permanent number by the IAU's Minor Planet Center (MPC), and the discoverers can then submit names for them, following the IAU's naming conventions. The list below concerns those minor planets in the specified number-range that have received names, and explains the meanings of those names.

Official naming citations of newly named small Solar System bodies are approved and published in a bulletin by IAU's Working Group for Small Bodies Nomenclature (WGSBN). Before May 2021, citations were published in MPC's Minor Planet Circulars for many decades. Recent citations can also be found on the JPL Small-Body Database (SBDB). Until his death in 2016, German astronomer Lutz D. Schmadel compiled these citations into the Dictionary of Minor Planet Names (DMP) and regularly updated the collection.

Based on Paul Herget's The Names of the Minor Planets, Schmadel also researched the unclear origin of numerous asteroids, most of which had been named prior to World War II. This article incorporates text from this source, which is in the public domain: SBDB New namings may only be added to this list below after official publication as the preannouncement of names is condemned. The WGSBN publishes a comprehensive guideline for the naming rules of non-cometary small Solar System bodies.

Named minor planet	Provisional	This minor planet was named for...	Ref · Catalog
711327 Ovidiuignat	2014 NA_{73}	Ovidiu Ignat, manager of the Astronomical Sciences Museum in Baia Mare, Romania.	IAU · 711327
711527 Tudor	2014 OH_{345}	Vlad Tudor, Romanian software engineer.	IAU · 711527
711599 Kane	2014 PV_{19}	Stephen R. Kane (b. 1973), Australian-American professor of planetary astrophysics at the University of California, Riverside.	IAU · 711599
711824 Infante	2014 QM_{279}	Leopoldo Infante (born 1955), Chilean astronomer and the current director of Las Campanas Observatory.	IAU · 711824
