= List of minor planets: 836001–837000 =

The following is a partial list of minor planets, running from minor-planet number 836001 through 837000, inclusive. The primary data for this and other partial lists is based on JPL's "Small-Body Orbital Elements" and data available from the Minor Planet Center. Critical list information is also provided by the MPC, unless otherwise specified from Lowell Observatory. A detailed description of the table's columns and additional sources are given on the main page including a complete list of every page in this series, and a statistical break-up on the dynamical classification of minor planets.

Also see the summary list of all named bodies in numerical and alphabetical order, and the corresponding naming citations for the number range of this particular list. New namings may only be added to this list after official publication, as the preannouncement of names is condemned by the Working Group for Small Bodies Nomenclature of the International Astronomical Union.

Near-Earth obj.	MBA (inner)	MBA (outer)	Centaur
Mars-crosser	MBA (middle)	Jupiter trojan	Trans-Neptunian obj.
Unclassified

== 836001–836100 ==
Designation			Discovery			Properties		Ref
Permanent	Provisional	Named after	Date	Site	Discoverer(s)	Category	Diam.	Ref
836001	2012 BV_{66}	—	January 27, 2007	Mount Lemmon	Mount Lemmon Survey	·	1.4 km	MPC · JPL
836002	2012 BA_{67}	—	September 10, 2010	Kitt Peak	Spacewatch	·	1.2 km	MPC · JPL
836003	2012 BD_{71}	—	August 7, 2010	WISE	WISE	·	3.1 km	MPC · JPL
836004	2012 BU_{75}	—	January 18, 2012	Mount Lemmon	Mount Lemmon Survey	·	810 m	MPC · JPL
836005	2012 BV_{79}	—	January 27, 2012	Mount Lemmon	Mount Lemmon Survey	·	1.3 km	MPC · JPL
836006	2012 BQ_{81}	—	November 16, 2010	Mount Lemmon	Mount Lemmon Survey	·	1.8 km	MPC · JPL
836007	2012 BX_{82}	—	January 27, 2012	Mount Lemmon	Mount Lemmon Survey	·	750 m	MPC · JPL
836008	2012 BR_{92}	—	January 26, 2012	Haleakala	Pan-STARRS 1	TIR	2.1 km	MPC · JPL
836009	2012 BU_{92}	—	January 26, 2012	Haleakala	Pan-STARRS 1	·	750 m	MPC · JPL
836010	2012 BF_{93}	—	January 26, 2012	Haleakala	Pan-STARRS 1	·	390 m	MPC · JPL
836011	2012 BJ_{96}	—	January 29, 2012	Catalina	CSS	H	440 m	MPC · JPL
836012	2012 BA_{99}	—	October 1, 2010	Mount Lemmon	Mount Lemmon Survey	·	1.4 km	MPC · JPL
836013	2012 BF_{99}	—	January 11, 2008	Kitt Peak	Spacewatch	·	780 m	MPC · JPL
836014	2012 BU_{99}	—	January 27, 2012	Kitt Peak	Spacewatch	·	2.3 km	MPC · JPL
836015	2012 BU_{108}	—	July 6, 2010	WISE	WISE	·	2.7 km	MPC · JPL
836016	2012 BU_{113}	—	January 27, 2012	Mount Lemmon	Mount Lemmon Survey	V	450 m	MPC · JPL
836017	2012 BR_{114}	—	January 27, 2012	Mount Lemmon	Mount Lemmon Survey	EOS	1.5 km	MPC · JPL
836018	2012 BJ_{115}	—	January 27, 2012	Mount Lemmon	Mount Lemmon Survey	·	1.1 km	MPC · JPL
836019	2012 BJ_{117}	—	January 27, 2012	Mount Lemmon	Mount Lemmon Survey	THM	1.8 km	MPC · JPL
836020	2012 BR_{119}	—	January 27, 2012	Mount Lemmon	Mount Lemmon Survey	·	2.1 km	MPC · JPL
836021	2012 BV_{148}	—	July 24, 2010	WISE	WISE	·	2.1 km	MPC · JPL
836022	2012 BO_{150}	—	June 1, 2008	Kitt Peak	Spacewatch	·	1.4 km	MPC · JPL
836023	2012 BR_{156}	—	February 21, 2007	Mount Lemmon	Mount Lemmon Survey	THM	1.9 km	MPC · JPL
836024	2012 BG_{158}	—	January 19, 2012	Mount Lemmon	Mount Lemmon Survey	TIR	1.9 km	MPC · JPL
836025	2012 BY_{161}	—	January 19, 2012	Haleakala	Pan-STARRS 1	·	2.0 km	MPC · JPL
836026	2012 BB_{162}	—	January 27, 2012	Kitt Peak	Spacewatch	·	950 m	MPC · JPL
836027	2012 BP_{162}	—	November 27, 2014	Haleakala	Pan-STARRS 1	·	440 m	MPC · JPL
836028	2012 BH_{163}	—	June 15, 2010	WISE	WISE	T_{j} (2.99)	2.8 km	MPC · JPL
836029	2012 BL_{163}	—	July 2, 2014	Haleakala	Pan-STARRS 1	·	2.7 km	MPC · JPL
836030	2012 BX_{164}	—	January 20, 2012	Kitt Peak	Spacewatch	·	1.6 km	MPC · JPL
836031	2012 BS_{165}	—	January 20, 2012	Haleakala	Pan-STARRS 1	·	1.1 km	MPC · JPL
836032	2012 BW_{165}	—	January 19, 2012	Haleakala	Pan-STARRS 1	·	2.2 km	MPC · JPL
836033	2012 BS_{167}	—	January 25, 2012	Kitt Peak	Spacewatch	T_{j} (2.91)	2.8 km	MPC · JPL
836034	2012 BU_{167}	—	December 13, 2015	Haleakala	Pan-STARRS 1	·	780 m	MPC · JPL
836035	2012 BL_{168}	—	August 10, 2010	Kitt Peak	Spacewatch	·	1.4 km	MPC · JPL
836036	2012 BT_{168}	—	June 1, 2013	Nogales	M. Schwartz, P. R. Holvorcem	·	1.4 km	MPC · JPL
836037	2012 BQ_{170}	—	January 20, 2012	Kitt Peak	Spacewatch	·	2.2 km	MPC · JPL
836038	2012 BW_{170}	—	January 29, 2012	Kitt Peak	Spacewatch	·	1.6 km	MPC · JPL
836039	2012 BB_{171}	—	August 22, 2014	Haleakala	Pan-STARRS 1	·	2.1 km	MPC · JPL
836040	2012 BE_{171}	—	January 1, 2012	Mount Lemmon	Mount Lemmon Survey	·	2.3 km	MPC · JPL
836041	2012 BM_{171}	—	September 18, 2014	Haleakala	Pan-STARRS 1	·	1.5 km	MPC · JPL
836042	2012 BV_{171}	—	July 25, 2014	Haleakala	Pan-STARRS 1	·	1.6 km	MPC · JPL
836043	2012 BE_{174}	—	January 29, 2012	Mount Lemmon	Mount Lemmon Survey	·	1.8 km	MPC · JPL
836044	2012 BH_{174}	—	January 20, 2012	Haleakala	Pan-STARRS 1	·	2.0 km	MPC · JPL
836045	2012 BS_{174}	—	January 30, 2012	Mount Lemmon	Mount Lemmon Survey	·	690 m	MPC · JPL
836046	2012 BO_{176}	—	January 19, 2012	Haleakala	Pan-STARRS 1	·	1.5 km	MPC · JPL
836047	2012 BP_{176}	—	January 18, 2012	Kitt Peak	Spacewatch	·	530 m	MPC · JPL
836048	2012 BR_{176}	—	January 26, 2012	Mount Lemmon	Mount Lemmon Survey	·	2.3 km	MPC · JPL
836049	2012 BY_{176}	—	January 27, 2012	Mount Lemmon	Mount Lemmon Survey	·	2.3 km	MPC · JPL
836050	2012 BR_{177}	—	January 26, 2012	Haleakala	Pan-STARRS 1	·	2.1 km	MPC · JPL
836051	2012 BY_{178}	—	January 26, 2012	Mount Lemmon	Mount Lemmon Survey	·	1.8 km	MPC · JPL
836052	2012 BP_{180}	—	January 26, 2012	Mount Lemmon	Mount Lemmon Survey	·	1.6 km	MPC · JPL
836053	2012 BY_{180}	—	January 25, 2012	Kitt Peak	Spacewatch	·	1.2 km	MPC · JPL
836054	2012 BW_{183}	—	January 25, 2012	Haleakala	Pan-STARRS 1	·	1.2 km	MPC · JPL
836055	2012 BD_{186}	—	January 26, 2012	Haleakala	Pan-STARRS 1	URS	2.6 km	MPC · JPL
836056	2012 BS_{186}	—	January 26, 2012	Mount Lemmon	Mount Lemmon Survey	L4	6.0 km	MPC · JPL
836057	2012 BV_{186}	—	January 18, 2012	Mount Lemmon	Mount Lemmon Survey	·	1.8 km	MPC · JPL
836058	2012 BB_{187}	—	January 19, 2012	Haleakala	Pan-STARRS 1	·	2.0 km	MPC · JPL
836059	2012 BT_{188}	—	January 27, 2012	Mount Lemmon	Mount Lemmon Survey	·	1.6 km	MPC · JPL
836060	2012 BY_{189}	—	January 19, 2012	Haleakala	Pan-STARRS 1	·	2.4 km	MPC · JPL
836061	2012 BU_{191}	—	October 15, 2015	Mount Lemmon	Mount Lemmon Survey	·	2.0 km	MPC · JPL
836062	2012 BG_{192}	—	January 19, 2012	Mount Lemmon	Mount Lemmon Survey	·	2.3 km	MPC · JPL
836063	2012 CW_{11}	—	July 18, 2010	WISE	WISE	·	1.4 km	MPC · JPL
836064	2012 CK_{14}	—	January 29, 2012	Kitt Peak	Spacewatch	ERI	1.0 km	MPC · JPL
836065	2012 CZ_{22}	—	June 25, 2010	WISE	WISE	·	3.0 km	MPC · JPL
836066	2012 CN_{23}	—	June 19, 2010	WISE	WISE	PHO	750 m	MPC · JPL
836067	2012 CQ_{26}	—	March 16, 2007	Mount Lemmon	Mount Lemmon Survey	·	1.5 km	MPC · JPL
836068	2012 CQ_{27}	—	January 17, 2012	Bergisch Gladbach	W. Bickel	THM	1.7 km	MPC · JPL
836069	2012 CX_{28}	—	January 19, 2012	Haleakala	Pan-STARRS 1	·	740 m	MPC · JPL
836070	2012 CE_{33}	—	February 2, 2012	Kitt Peak	Spacewatch	·	650 m	MPC · JPL
836071	2012 CJ_{33}	—	January 19, 2012	Haleakala	Pan-STARRS 1	·	1.6 km	MPC · JPL
836072	2012 CA_{37}	—	February 1, 2012	Kitt Peak	Spacewatch	·	2.7 km	MPC · JPL
836073	2012 CH_{40}	—	August 5, 2010	WISE	WISE	·	2.8 km	MPC · JPL
836074	2012 CO_{50}	—	April 8, 1999	Mount Hopkins	O. Naranjo, M. J. Holman	·	970 m	MPC · JPL
836075	2012 CK_{53}	—	February 15, 2012	Haleakala	Pan-STARRS 1	·	1.3 km	MPC · JPL
836076	2012 CD_{56}	—	January 21, 2012	Kitt Peak	Spacewatch	·	2.3 km	MPC · JPL
836077	2012 CT_{58}	—	February 1, 2012	Kitt Peak	Spacewatch	·	2.2 km	MPC · JPL
836078	2012 CK_{60}	—	July 13, 2010	WISE	WISE	T_{j} (2.98) · EUP	2.8 km	MPC · JPL
836079	2012 CM_{60}	—	July 25, 2014	Haleakala	Pan-STARRS 1	·	1.2 km	MPC · JPL
836080	2012 CV_{60}	—	December 8, 2005	Kitt Peak	Spacewatch	·	1.6 km	MPC · JPL
836081	2012 CL_{62}	—	February 1, 2012	Mount Lemmon	Mount Lemmon Survey	TIR	2.0 km	MPC · JPL
836082	2012 CV_{62}	—	February 1, 2012	Kitt Peak	Spacewatch	·	2.2 km	MPC · JPL
836083	2012 CY_{62}	—	September 17, 2014	Haleakala	Pan-STARRS 1	·	960 m	MPC · JPL
836084	2012 CR_{64}	—	August 28, 2014	Haleakala	Pan-STARRS 1	·	2.5 km	MPC · JPL
836085	2012 CJ_{65}	—	July 25, 2014	Haleakala	Pan-STARRS 1	·	1.7 km	MPC · JPL
836086	2012 CD_{67}	—	February 11, 2012	Mount Lemmon	Mount Lemmon Survey	·	560 m	MPC · JPL
836087	2012 CW_{67}	—	February 14, 2012	Haleakala	Pan-STARRS 1	·	1.1 km	MPC · JPL
836088	2012 CX_{67}	—	February 1, 2012	Mount Lemmon	Mount Lemmon Survey	·	2.2 km	MPC · JPL
836089	2012 CH_{68}	—	February 14, 2012	Haleakala	Pan-STARRS 1	EOS	1.2 km	MPC · JPL
836090	2012 CZ_{69}	—	February 15, 2012	Haleakala	Pan-STARRS 1	·	1.4 km	MPC · JPL
836091	2012 CX_{70}	—	February 1, 2012	Mount Lemmon	Mount Lemmon Survey	EUP	2.5 km	MPC · JPL
836092	2012 CX_{71}	—	February 1, 2012	Kitt Peak	Spacewatch	·	1.9 km	MPC · JPL
836093	2012 CG_{73}	—	March 21, 2009	Kitt Peak	Spacewatch	·	410 m	MPC · JPL
836094	2012 DR	—	February 16, 2012	Haleakala	Pan-STARRS 1	H	390 m	MPC · JPL
836095	2012 DT	—	January 10, 2012	Mount Lemmon	Mount Lemmon Survey	T_{j} (2.98)	2.8 km	MPC · JPL
836096	2012 DF_{1}	—	January 29, 2012	Kitt Peak	Spacewatch	·	2.5 km	MPC · JPL
836097	2012 DP_{3}	—	February 16, 2012	Haleakala	Pan-STARRS 1	H	370 m	MPC · JPL
836098	2012 DF_{7}	—	February 16, 2012	Haleakala	Pan-STARRS 1	TIR	1.9 km	MPC · JPL
836099	2012 DA_{10}	—	March 5, 2002	Sacramento Peak	SDSS	·	410 m	MPC · JPL
836100	2012 DT_{12}	—	August 29, 2005	Kitt Peak	Spacewatch	H	510 m	MPC · JPL

== 836101–836200 ==
back to top

Designation			Discovery			Properties		Ref
Permanent	Provisional	Named after	Date	Site	Discoverer(s)	Category	Diam.	Ref
836101	2012 DM_{15}	—	November 18, 2007	Mount Lemmon	Mount Lemmon Survey	·	550 m	MPC · JPL
836102	2012 DQ_{30}	—	March 13, 2010	Mount Lemmon	Mount Lemmon Survey	·	290 m	MPC · JPL
836103	2012 DC_{35}	—	January 13, 2008	Kitt Peak	Spacewatch	·	940 m	MPC · JPL
836104	2012 DJ_{35}	—	February 24, 2012	Kitt Peak	Spacewatch	·	1.2 km	MPC · JPL
836105	2012 DK_{35}	—	February 24, 2012	Kitt Peak	Spacewatch	·	2.6 km	MPC · JPL
836106	2012 DA_{42}	—	February 15, 2001	Roque de los Muchachos	D. D. Balam	THM	2.3 km	MPC · JPL
836107	2012 DZ_{45}	—	January 11, 2008	Kitt Peak	Spacewatch	MAS	670 m	MPC · JPL
836108	2012 DX_{51}	—	February 27, 2012	Roque de los Muchachos	EURONEAR	·	2.0 km	MPC · JPL
836109	2012 DW_{54}	—	January 22, 2006	Mount Lemmon	Mount Lemmon Survey	THM	1.8 km	MPC · JPL
836110	2012 DD_{67}	—	February 16, 2012	Haleakala	Pan-STARRS 1	·	530 m	MPC · JPL
836111	2012 DY_{70}	—	January 19, 2012	Haleakala	Pan-STARRS 1	·	480 m	MPC · JPL
836112 Danieloconnell	2012 DK_{85}	Danieloconnell	February 25, 2012	Mount Graham	K. Černis, R. P. Boyle	·	2.1 km	MPC · JPL
836113	2012 DV_{85}	—	February 26, 2012	Roque de los Muchachos	EURONEAR	·	870 m	MPC · JPL
836114	2012 DC_{88}	—	February 25, 2012	Mount Lemmon	Mount Lemmon Survey	·	2.3 km	MPC · JPL
836115	2012 DQ_{89}	—	February 27, 2012	Roque de los Muchachos	EURONEAR	·	1.4 km	MPC · JPL
836116	2012 DN_{93}	—	January 19, 2012	Haleakala	Pan-STARRS 1	·	730 m	MPC · JPL
836117	2012 DH_{97}	—	September 18, 2001	Sacramento Peak	SDSS	·	2.2 km	MPC · JPL
836118	2012 DJ_{104}	—	November 10, 2010	Mount Lemmon	Mount Lemmon Survey	·	1.4 km	MPC · JPL
836119	2012 DU_{107}	—	February 22, 2012	Catalina	CSS	EUP	2.9 km	MPC · JPL
836120	2012 DV_{108}	—	February 16, 2012	Haleakala	Pan-STARRS 1	·	640 m	MPC · JPL
836121	2012 DW_{108}	—	September 2, 2014	Haleakala	Pan-STARRS 1	·	1.6 km	MPC · JPL
836122	2012 DF_{109}	—	February 28, 2012	Haleakala	Pan-STARRS 1	EOS	1.3 km	MPC · JPL
836123	2012 DU_{115}	—	February 27, 2012	Haleakala	Pan-STARRS 1	·	540 m	MPC · JPL
836124	2012 DR_{116}	—	February 27, 2012	Haleakala	Pan-STARRS 1	·	1.3 km	MPC · JPL
836125	2012 DV_{116}	—	February 28, 2012	Haleakala	Pan-STARRS 1	V	430 m	MPC · JPL
836126	2012 DK_{117}	—	February 27, 2012	Haleakala	Pan-STARRS 1	·	2.4 km	MPC · JPL
836127	2012 DQ_{117}	—	February 27, 2012	Haleakala	Pan-STARRS 1	·	1.6 km	MPC · JPL
836128	2012 DO_{118}	—	February 28, 2012	Haleakala	Pan-STARRS 1	·	690 m	MPC · JPL
836129	2012 DT_{119}	—	February 20, 2012	Haleakala	Pan-STARRS 1	·	2.1 km	MPC · JPL
836130	2012 DW_{119}	—	February 24, 2012	Mount Lemmon	Mount Lemmon Survey	·	2.6 km	MPC · JPL
836131	2012 DE_{120}	—	February 26, 2012	Haleakala	Pan-STARRS 1	·	840 m	MPC · JPL
836132	2012 DG_{120}	—	February 28, 2012	Haleakala	Pan-STARRS 1	·	730 m	MPC · JPL
836133	2012 DU_{120}	—	February 23, 2012	Mount Lemmon	Mount Lemmon Survey	·	2.1 km	MPC · JPL
836134	2012 DY_{120}	—	February 27, 2012	Haleakala	Pan-STARRS 1	·	2.5 km	MPC · JPL
836135	2012 DF_{121}	—	February 23, 2012	Mount Lemmon	Mount Lemmon Survey	VER	1.9 km	MPC · JPL
836136	2012 DK_{121}	—	February 27, 2012	Haleakala	Pan-STARRS 1	·	2.0 km	MPC · JPL
836137	2012 DD_{122}	—	February 23, 2012	Mount Lemmon	Mount Lemmon Survey	NYS	660 m	MPC · JPL
836138	2012 DE_{122}	—	February 28, 2012	Haleakala	Pan-STARRS 1	·	560 m	MPC · JPL
836139	2012 DH_{122}	—	February 26, 2012	Haleakala	Pan-STARRS 1	·	550 m	MPC · JPL
836140	2012 DT_{126}	—	February 16, 2012	Haleakala	Pan-STARRS 1	·	680 m	MPC · JPL
836141	2012 DK_{127}	—	February 21, 2012	Mount Lemmon	Mount Lemmon Survey	·	2.5 km	MPC · JPL
836142	2012 DF_{130}	—	February 27, 2012	Haleakala	Pan-STARRS 1	·	1.4 km	MPC · JPL
836143	2012 DP_{130}	—	February 28, 2012	Haleakala	Pan-STARRS 1	·	1.1 km	MPC · JPL
836144	2012 EU_{9}	—	March 14, 2012	Mount Lemmon	Mount Lemmon Survey	H	400 m	MPC · JPL
836145	2012 EO_{13}	—	March 15, 2012	Mount Lemmon	Mount Lemmon Survey	·	2.1 km	MPC · JPL
836146	2012 EP_{19}	—	March 13, 2012	Mount Lemmon	Mount Lemmon Survey	·	2.5 km	MPC · JPL
836147	2012 EQ_{19}	—	March 14, 2012	Kitt Peak	Spacewatch	·	2.6 km	MPC · JPL
836148	2012 EG_{21}	—	March 1, 2012	Mount Lemmon	Mount Lemmon Survey	·	2.2 km	MPC · JPL
836149	2012 EO_{21}	—	March 15, 2012	Mount Lemmon	Mount Lemmon Survey	TIR	2.2 km	MPC · JPL
836150	2012 EQ_{21}	—	March 13, 2012	Kitt Peak	Spacewatch	·	2.5 km	MPC · JPL
836151	2012 EV_{23}	—	March 4, 2012	Kitt Peak	Spacewatch	·	730 m	MPC · JPL
836152	2012 EL_{24}	—	July 26, 2014	Haleakala	Pan-STARRS 1	EOS	1.3 km	MPC · JPL
836153	2012 ER_{25}	—	March 15, 2012	Mount Lemmon	Mount Lemmon Survey	·	430 m	MPC · JPL
836154	2012 EV_{25}	—	March 13, 2012	Mount Lemmon	Mount Lemmon Survey	BRA	930 m	MPC · JPL
836155	2012 EO_{26}	—	March 13, 2012	Mount Lemmon	Mount Lemmon Survey	·	680 m	MPC · JPL
836156	2012 ET_{26}	—	March 13, 2012	Mount Lemmon	Mount Lemmon Survey	·	2.2 km	MPC · JPL
836157	2012 EX_{26}	—	March 4, 2012	Mount Lemmon	Mount Lemmon Survey	·	1.9 km	MPC · JPL
836158	2012 EY_{26}	—	March 14, 2012	Haleakala	Pan-STARRS 1	·	2.2 km	MPC · JPL
836159	2012 EO_{27}	—	March 15, 2012	Mount Lemmon	Mount Lemmon Survey	·	2.5 km	MPC · JPL
836160	2012 ES_{27}	—	March 4, 2012	Mount Lemmon	Mount Lemmon Survey	·	2.5 km	MPC · JPL
836161	2012 EV_{27}	—	March 15, 2012	Mount Lemmon	Mount Lemmon Survey	·	1.8 km	MPC · JPL
836162	2012 EJ_{28}	—	March 15, 2012	Mount Lemmon	Mount Lemmon Survey	·	1.4 km	MPC · JPL
836163	2012 EJ_{30}	—	March 15, 2012	Mount Lemmon	Mount Lemmon Survey	HYG	2.0 km	MPC · JPL
836164	2012 EE_{32}	—	March 1, 2012	Mount Lemmon	Mount Lemmon Survey	·	2.2 km	MPC · JPL
836165	2012 EH_{32}	—	March 15, 2012	Mount Lemmon	Mount Lemmon Survey	·	2.2 km	MPC · JPL
836166	2012 EP_{32}	—	March 15, 2012	Mount Lemmon	Mount Lemmon Survey	·	1.6 km	MPC · JPL
836167	2012 EH_{34}	—	March 14, 2012	Mount Lemmon	Mount Lemmon Survey	·	2.0 km	MPC · JPL
836168	2012 FV_{1}	—	February 26, 2012	Haleakala	Pan-STARRS 1	·	2.3 km	MPC · JPL
836169	2012 FV_{5}	—	March 20, 1999	Sacramento Peak	SDSS	·	1.3 km	MPC · JPL
836170	2012 FQ_{6}	—	February 13, 2012	Haleakala	Pan-STARRS 1	·	2.0 km	MPC · JPL
836171	2012 FU_{12}	—	February 25, 2012	Kitt Peak	Spacewatch	·	2.2 km	MPC · JPL
836172	2012 FD_{21}	—	March 17, 2012	Mount Lemmon	Mount Lemmon Survey	·	990 m	MPC · JPL
836173	2012 FY_{21}	—	February 28, 2012	Haleakala	Pan-STARRS 1	·	2.3 km	MPC · JPL
836174	2012 FG_{24}	—	February 20, 2012	Haleakala	Pan-STARRS 1	H	430 m	MPC · JPL
836175	2012 FS_{31}	—	March 22, 2012	Mount Lemmon	Mount Lemmon Survey	·	2.0 km	MPC · JPL
836176	2012 FL_{33}	—	March 24, 2012	Mount Lemmon	Mount Lemmon Survey	·	1.0 km	MPC · JPL
836177	2012 FR_{37}	—	September 24, 2009	Zelenchukskaya	T. V. Krjačko, B. Satovski	·	2.6 km	MPC · JPL
836178	2012 FQ_{39}	—	January 31, 2006	Kitt Peak	Spacewatch	·	2.3 km	MPC · JPL
836179	2012 FS_{42}	—	March 23, 2012	Mount Lemmon	Mount Lemmon Survey	·	450 m	MPC · JPL
836180	2012 FM_{46}	—	February 26, 2012	Kitt Peak	Spacewatch	EUN	990 m	MPC · JPL
836181	2012 FQ_{57}	—	January 12, 2010	WISE	WISE	EUP	3.6 km	MPC · JPL
836182	2012 FE_{66}	—	February 28, 2012	Haleakala	Pan-STARRS 1	AEO	820 m	MPC · JPL
836183	2012 FE_{71}	—	March 31, 2012	Haleakala	Pan-STARRS 1	H	450 m	MPC · JPL
836184	2012 FH_{79}	—	March 13, 2008	Kitt Peak	Spacewatch	·	820 m	MPC · JPL
836185	2012 FC_{81}	—	March 14, 2012	Haleakala	Pan-STARRS 1	H	290 m	MPC · JPL
836186	2012 FU_{82}	—	October 29, 2002	Sacramento Peak	SDSS	V	740 m	MPC · JPL
836187	2012 FS_{84}	—	March 16, 2012	Mount Lemmon	Mount Lemmon Survey	H	320 m	MPC · JPL
836188	2012 FE_{85}	—	April 3, 2008	Kitt Peak	Spacewatch	EUN	750 m	MPC · JPL
836189	2012 FE_{86}	—	March 27, 2012	Kitt Peak	Spacewatch	·	1.4 km	MPC · JPL
836190	2012 FN_{89}	—	March 16, 2012	Mount Lemmon	Mount Lemmon Survey	·	650 m	MPC · JPL
836191	2012 FT_{89}	—	March 16, 2012	Mount Lemmon	Mount Lemmon Survey	·	1.3 km	MPC · JPL
836192	2012 FR_{90}	—	March 25, 2012	Mount Lemmon	Mount Lemmon Survey	EOS	1.6 km	MPC · JPL
836193	2012 FP_{93}	—	August 11, 2016	Haleakala	Pan-STARRS 1	·	510 m	MPC · JPL
836194	2012 FA_{95}	—	September 9, 2013	Haleakala	Pan-STARRS 1	·	710 m	MPC · JPL
836195	2012 FA_{96}	—	March 16, 2012	Piszkéstető	K. Sárneczky	·	920 m	MPC · JPL
836196	2012 FC_{96}	—	March 21, 2012	Mount Lemmon	Mount Lemmon Survey	EOS	1.6 km	MPC · JPL
836197	2012 FU_{96}	—	January 27, 2017	Haleakala	Pan-STARRS 1	·	2.0 km	MPC · JPL
836198	2012 FW_{96}	—	September 6, 2013	Kitt Peak	Spacewatch	·	530 m	MPC · JPL
836199	2012 FU_{97}	—	March 27, 2018	Mount Lemmon	Mount Lemmon Survey	THB	2.5 km	MPC · JPL
836200	2012 FB_{98}	—	March 29, 2012	Haleakala	Pan-STARRS 1	·	2.4 km	MPC · JPL

== 836201–836300 ==
back to top

Designation			Discovery			Properties		Ref
Permanent	Provisional	Named after	Date	Site	Discoverer(s)	Category	Diam.	Ref
836201	2012 FQ_{98}	—	March 31, 2012	Mount Lemmon	Mount Lemmon Survey	·	740 m	MPC · JPL
836202	2012 FX_{99}	—	March 24, 2012	Kitt Peak	Spacewatch	NYS	820 m	MPC · JPL
836203	2012 FJ_{101}	—	April 10, 2005	Mount Lemmon	Mount Lemmon Survey	·	720 m	MPC · JPL
836204	2012 FR_{101}	—	March 16, 2012	Kitt Peak	Spacewatch	MAS	560 m	MPC · JPL
836205	2012 FO_{104}	—	March 30, 2012	Mount Lemmon	Mount Lemmon Survey	·	440 m	MPC · JPL
836206	2012 FV_{106}	—	March 28, 2012	Kitt Peak	Spacewatch	·	1.1 km	MPC · JPL
836207	2012 FL_{109}	—	March 29, 2012	Haleakala	Pan-STARRS 1	·	1.2 km	MPC · JPL
836208	2012 FA_{111}	—	October 30, 2002	Kitt Peak	Spacewatch	H	410 m	MPC · JPL
836209	2012 FJ_{111}	—	March 25, 2012	Mount Lemmon	Mount Lemmon Survey	·	2.1 km	MPC · JPL
836210	2012 FT_{111}	—	March 16, 2012	Kitt Peak	Spacewatch	·	790 m	MPC · JPL
836211	2012 FC_{113}	—	March 22, 2012	Mount Lemmon	Mount Lemmon Survey	·	600 m	MPC · JPL
836212	2012 FD_{113}	—	March 29, 2012	Haleakala	Pan-STARRS 1	·	1.6 km	MPC · JPL
836213	2012 FL_{116}	—	December 19, 2007	Mount Lemmon	Mount Lemmon Survey	·	750 m	MPC · JPL
836214	2012 GS	—	March 16, 2012	Catalina	CSS	·	760 m	MPC · JPL
836215	2012 GH_{5}	—	March 31, 2012	Kitt Peak	Spacewatch	H	350 m	MPC · JPL
836216	2012 GA_{10}	—	April 13, 2012	Haleakala	Pan-STARRS 1	·	460 m	MPC · JPL
836217	2012 GK_{16}	—	April 15, 2012	Haleakala	Pan-STARRS 1	·	560 m	MPC · JPL
836218	2012 GL_{21}	—	September 26, 2000	Sacramento Peak	SDSS	·	1.1 km	MPC · JPL
836219	2012 GY_{21}	—	November 10, 2009	Mount Lemmon	Mount Lemmon Survey	·	2.3 km	MPC · JPL
836220	2012 GF_{22}	—	April 15, 2012	Haleakala	Pan-STARRS 1	·	780 m	MPC · JPL
836221	2012 GK_{29}	—	January 10, 2008	Kitt Peak	Spacewatch	MAS	560 m	MPC · JPL
836222	2012 GA_{35}	—	March 20, 1999	Sacramento Peak	SDSS	·	970 m	MPC · JPL
836223	2012 GD_{38}	—	April 15, 2012	Haleakala	Pan-STARRS 1	·	1.5 km	MPC · JPL
836224	2012 GR_{40}	—	April 3, 2016	Haleakala	Pan-STARRS 1	·	730 m	MPC · JPL
836225	2012 GB_{42}	—	October 9, 2013	Mount Lemmon	Mount Lemmon Survey	MAS	540 m	MPC · JPL
836226	2012 GV_{42}	—	April 15, 2012	Haleakala	Pan-STARRS 1	·	2.4 km	MPC · JPL
836227	2012 GX_{42}	—	February 17, 2015	Haleakala	Pan-STARRS 1	·	500 m	MPC · JPL
836228	2012 GE_{43}	—	January 9, 2016	Haleakala	Pan-STARRS 1	·	1.7 km	MPC · JPL
836229	2012 GJ_{43}	—	September 3, 2013	Haleakala	Pan-STARRS 1	·	930 m	MPC · JPL
836230	2012 GH_{44}	—	April 12, 2012	Haleakala	Pan-STARRS 1	·	2.3 km	MPC · JPL
836231	2012 GN_{45}	—	April 15, 2012	Haleakala	Pan-STARRS 1	·	2.2 km	MPC · JPL
836232	2012 GN_{46}	—	September 19, 2014	Haleakala	Pan-STARRS 1	·	1.3 km	MPC · JPL
836233	2012 GK_{47}	—	February 21, 2017	Haleakala	Pan-STARRS 1	EOS	1.3 km	MPC · JPL
836234	2012 GY_{47}	—	June 18, 2013	Haleakala	Pan-STARRS 1	KOR	950 m	MPC · JPL
836235	2012 GZ_{47}	—	November 4, 2014	Mount Lemmon	Mount Lemmon Survey	·	980 m	MPC · JPL
836236	2012 GW_{49}	—	April 1, 2012	Mount Lemmon	Mount Lemmon Survey	V	430 m	MPC · JPL
836237	2012 GP_{54}	—	April 15, 2012	Haleakala	Pan-STARRS 1	·	1.7 km	MPC · JPL
836238	2012 HB_{1}	—	March 15, 2012	Kitt Peak	Spacewatch	·	1.7 km	MPC · JPL
836239	2012 HT_{5}	—	December 27, 2005	Kitt Peak	Spacewatch	·	1.7 km	MPC · JPL
836240	2012 HW_{18}	—	April 16, 2012	Kitt Peak	Spacewatch	·	560 m	MPC · JPL
836241	2012 HL_{20}	—	April 18, 2012	Mount Lemmon	Mount Lemmon Survey	H	310 m	MPC · JPL
836242	2012 HO_{29}	—	April 27, 2012	Haleakala	Pan-STARRS 1	·	700 m	MPC · JPL
836243	2012 HY_{41}	—	October 29, 2001	Palomar Mountain	NEAT	·	2.1 km	MPC · JPL
836244	2012 HN_{46}	—	April 21, 2012	Kitt Peak	Spacewatch	·	2.7 km	MPC · JPL
836245	2012 HC_{50}	—	March 31, 2012	Kitt Peak	Spacewatch	PHO	730 m	MPC · JPL
836246	2012 HB_{56}	—	March 16, 2012	Kitt Peak	Spacewatch	·	2.9 km	MPC · JPL
836247	2012 HX_{59}	—	March 27, 2012	Kitt Peak	Spacewatch	·	1.9 km	MPC · JPL
836248	2012 HP_{60}	—	March 28, 2012	Mount Lemmon	Mount Lemmon Survey	·	790 m	MPC · JPL
836249	2012 HD_{63}	—	March 16, 2012	Kitt Peak	Spacewatch	HNS	840 m	MPC · JPL
836250	2012 HO_{65}	—	April 20, 2012	Kitt Peak	Spacewatch	·	1.1 km	MPC · JPL
836251	2012 HQ_{76}	—	April 15, 2012	Haleakala	Pan-STARRS 1	·	2.0 km	MPC · JPL
836252	2012 HU_{82}	—	March 18, 2012	Piszkés-tető	K. Sárneczky, A. Szing	·	1.1 km	MPC · JPL
836253	2012 HX_{82}	—	April 19, 2012	Mount Lemmon	Mount Lemmon Survey	H	330 m	MPC · JPL
836254	2012 HH_{83}	—	April 27, 2012	Haleakala	Pan-STARRS 1	TIR	1.9 km	MPC · JPL
836255	2012 HN_{84}	—	April 18, 2012	Palomar	Palomar Transient Factory	T_{j} (2.95)	2.0 km	MPC · JPL
836256	2012 HC_{87}	—	April 27, 2012	Haleakala	Pan-STARRS 1	·	1.6 km	MPC · JPL
836257	2012 HL_{88}	—	April 27, 2012	Mount Lemmon	Mount Lemmon Survey	(1547)	1.4 km	MPC · JPL
836258	2012 HR_{88}	—	April 27, 2012	Haleakala	Pan-STARRS 1	·	2.1 km	MPC · JPL
836259	2012 HF_{89}	—	April 16, 2012	Haleakala	Pan-STARRS 1	·	2.4 km	MPC · JPL
836260	2012 HL_{90}	—	April 22, 2012	Kitt Peak	Spacewatch	·	850 m	MPC · JPL
836261	2012 HM_{90}	—	April 27, 2012	Haleakala	Pan-STARRS 1	·	660 m	MPC · JPL
836262	2012 HB_{91}	—	April 24, 2012	Westfield	International Astronomical Search Collaboration	·	1.5 km	MPC · JPL
836263	2012 HN_{91}	—	January 7, 2010	WISE	WISE	·	3.0 km	MPC · JPL
836264	2012 HQ_{92}	—	April 27, 2012	Haleakala	Pan-STARRS 1	·	590 m	MPC · JPL
836265	2012 HR_{94}	—	March 31, 2017	Mount Lemmon	Mount Lemmon Survey	·	2.0 km	MPC · JPL
836266	2012 HF_{95}	—	April 27, 2012	Haleakala	Pan-STARRS 1	·	2.1 km	MPC · JPL
836267	2012 HS_{95}	—	October 3, 2014	Mount Lemmon	Mount Lemmon Survey	·	2.5 km	MPC · JPL
836268	2012 HJ_{97}	—	April 18, 2012	Mount Lemmon	Mount Lemmon Survey	·	2.3 km	MPC · JPL
836269	2012 HS_{97}	—	October 15, 2014	Mount Lemmon	Mount Lemmon Survey	·	2.1 km	MPC · JPL
836270	2012 HV_{97}	—	August 27, 2014	Haleakala	Pan-STARRS 1	·	2.4 km	MPC · JPL
836271	2012 HM_{100}	—	April 27, 2012	Haleakala	Pan-STARRS 1	·	880 m	MPC · JPL
836272	2012 HQ_{101}	—	April 27, 2012	Haleakala	Pan-STARRS 1	·	900 m	MPC · JPL
836273	2012 HK_{102}	—	April 17, 2012	Westfield	International Astronomical Search Collaboration	·	860 m	MPC · JPL
836274	2012 HN_{104}	—	April 20, 2012	Mount Lemmon	Mount Lemmon Survey	·	1.1 km	MPC · JPL
836275 Pietromaffi	2012 HS_{104}	Pietromaffi	April 25, 2012	Mount Graham	K. Černis, R. P. Boyle	·	2.7 km	MPC · JPL
836276	2012 HP_{106}	—	April 20, 2012	Mount Lemmon	Mount Lemmon Survey	·	500 m	MPC · JPL
836277	2012 HS_{108}	—	April 24, 2012	Mount Lemmon	Mount Lemmon Survey	·	870 m	MPC · JPL
836278	2012 HY_{108}	—	April 16, 2012	Haleakala	Pan-STARRS 1	·	680 m	MPC · JPL
836279	2012 HS_{109}	—	April 27, 2012	Haleakala	Pan-STARRS 1	(5)	720 m	MPC · JPL
836280	2012 JF_{3}	—	May 12, 2012	Mount Lemmon	Mount Lemmon Survey	(1547)	920 m	MPC · JPL
836281	2012 JH_{8}	—	April 21, 2012	Mount Lemmon	Mount Lemmon Survey	·	1.5 km	MPC · JPL
836282	2012 JP_{14}	—	April 21, 2012	Mount Lemmon	Mount Lemmon Survey	MAR	690 m	MPC · JPL
836283	2012 JW_{14}	—	April 27, 2012	Haleakala	Pan-STARRS 1	·	1.3 km	MPC · JPL
836284	2012 JE_{18}	—	May 13, 2012	Kitt Peak	Spacewatch	PHO	710 m	MPC · JPL
836285	2012 JR_{26}	—	April 20, 2012	Mount Lemmon	Mount Lemmon Survey	BAR	910 m	MPC · JPL
836286	2012 JT_{27}	—	March 20, 1999	Sacramento Peak	SDSS	·	1.2 km	MPC · JPL
836287	2012 JF_{30}	—	May 14, 2012	Haleakala	Pan-STARRS 1	·	980 m	MPC · JPL
836288	2012 JG_{35}	—	May 15, 2012	Mount Lemmon	Mount Lemmon Survey	TEL	1.1 km	MPC · JPL
836289	2012 JL_{38}	—	April 27, 2012	Haleakala	Pan-STARRS 1	·	820 m	MPC · JPL
836290	2012 JV_{40}	—	May 12, 2012	Haleakala	Pan-STARRS 1	(5)	1.0 km	MPC · JPL
836291	2012 JM_{41}	—	May 13, 2012	Mount Lemmon	Mount Lemmon Survey	·	800 m	MPC · JPL
836292	2012 JA_{42}	—	May 13, 2012	Mount Lemmon	Mount Lemmon Survey	EOS	1.7 km	MPC · JPL
836293	2012 JC_{42}	—	March 20, 1999	Sacramento Peak	SDSS	·	640 m	MPC · JPL
836294	2012 JL_{47}	—	May 14, 2012	Haleakala	Pan-STARRS 1	MAR	660 m	MPC · JPL
836295	2012 JB_{50}	—	May 12, 2012	Mount Lemmon	Mount Lemmon Survey	·	1.8 km	MPC · JPL
836296	2012 JX_{51}	—	April 24, 2012	Mount Lemmon	Mount Lemmon Survey	LIX	2.4 km	MPC · JPL
836297	2012 JU_{54}	—	May 12, 2012	Mount Lemmon	Mount Lemmon Survey	PHO	590 m	MPC · JPL
836298	2012 JB_{55}	—	April 21, 2012	Mount Lemmon	Mount Lemmon Survey	·	860 m	MPC · JPL
836299	2012 JY_{58}	—	May 13, 2012	Mount Lemmon	Mount Lemmon Survey	·	2.3 km	MPC · JPL
836300	2012 JU_{59}	—	April 30, 2012	Kitt Peak	Spacewatch	MAR	650 m	MPC · JPL

== 836301–836400 ==
back to top

Designation			Discovery			Properties		Ref
Permanent	Provisional	Named after	Date	Site	Discoverer(s)	Category	Diam.	Ref
836301	2012 JF_{65}	—	May 15, 2012	Haleakala	Pan-STARRS 1	·	490 m	MPC · JPL
836302	2012 JX_{66}	—	May 24, 2012	Mount Lemmon	Mount Lemmon Survey	BAR	860 m	MPC · JPL
836303	2012 JN_{68}	—	February 11, 2010	WISE	WISE	URS	2.8 km	MPC · JPL
836304	2012 JH_{69}	—	May 1, 2012	Mount Lemmon	Mount Lemmon Survey	·	2.1 km	MPC · JPL
836305	2012 JV_{70}	—	May 15, 2012	Haleakala	Pan-STARRS 1	·	850 m	MPC · JPL
836306	2012 JO_{71}	—	May 14, 2012	Haleakala	Pan-STARRS 1	·	2.7 km	MPC · JPL
836307	2012 KD_{2}	—	April 25, 2012	Catalina	CSS	H	520 m	MPC · JPL
836308	2012 KT_{10}	—	April 28, 2012	Mount Lemmon	Mount Lemmon Survey	EUN	780 m	MPC · JPL
836309	2012 KW_{12}	—	April 25, 2012	Mount Lemmon	Mount Lemmon Survey	H	340 m	MPC · JPL
836310	2012 KM_{19}	—	April 27, 2012	Haleakala	Pan-STARRS 1	·	1.6 km	MPC · JPL
836311	2012 KS_{24}	—	May 23, 2012	Mount Lemmon	Mount Lemmon Survey	H	400 m	MPC · JPL
836312	2012 KP_{30}	—	May 19, 2012	Haleakala	Pan-STARRS 1	·	500 m	MPC · JPL
836313	2012 KY_{30}	—	April 21, 2012	Catalina	CSS	TIR	2.1 km	MPC · JPL
836314	2012 KW_{32}	—	May 16, 2012	Mount Lemmon	Mount Lemmon Survey	·	1.1 km	MPC · JPL
836315	2012 KU_{33}	—	May 16, 2012	Mount Lemmon	Mount Lemmon Survey	·	710 m	MPC · JPL
836316	2012 KX_{34}	—	April 27, 2012	Mount Lemmon	Mount Lemmon Survey	·	830 m	MPC · JPL
836317	2012 KX_{35}	—	May 1, 2012	Mount Lemmon	Mount Lemmon Survey	·	490 m	MPC · JPL
836318	2012 KC_{39}	—	May 18, 2012	Mount Lemmon	Mount Lemmon Survey	·	1.8 km	MPC · JPL
836319	2012 KG_{43}	—	May 18, 2012	Haleakala	Pan-STARRS 1	BRG	900 m	MPC · JPL
836320	2012 KH_{52}	—	May 16, 2012	Haleakala	Pan-STARRS 1	·	960 m	MPC · JPL
836321	2012 KY_{53}	—	April 1, 2016	Haleakala	Pan-STARRS 1	·	770 m	MPC · JPL
836322	2012 KK_{55}	—	May 27, 2012	Mount Lemmon	Mount Lemmon Survey	·	870 m	MPC · JPL
836323	2012 KO_{55}	—	May 23, 2012	Kitt Peak	Spacewatch	·	1.1 km	MPC · JPL
836324	2012 KS_{55}	—	May 16, 2012	Haleakala	Pan-STARRS 1	·	870 m	MPC · JPL
836325	2012 KS_{57}	—	December 10, 2017	Haleakala	Pan-STARRS 1	·	520 m	MPC · JPL
836326	2012 KA_{58}	—	March 20, 2017	Haleakala	Pan-STARRS 1	·	2.3 km	MPC · JPL
836327	2012 KT_{58}	—	May 21, 2012	Mount Lemmon	Mount Lemmon Survey	·	2.2 km	MPC · JPL
836328	2012 KR_{59}	—	May 16, 2012	Haleakala	Pan-STARRS 1	·	1.7 km	MPC · JPL
836329	2012 KL_{60}	—	May 30, 2012	Mount Lemmon	Mount Lemmon Survey	MAR	710 m	MPC · JPL
836330	2012 KX_{60}	—	May 27, 2012	Mount Lemmon	Mount Lemmon Survey	EUN	900 m	MPC · JPL
836331	2012 KF_{61}	—	May 16, 2012	Haleakala	Pan-STARRS 1	·	910 m	MPC · JPL
836332	2012 KT_{61}	—	May 21, 2012	Haleakala	Pan-STARRS 1	V	480 m	MPC · JPL
836333	2012 KY_{63}	—	May 28, 2012	Mount Lemmon	Mount Lemmon Survey	·	1.1 km	MPC · JPL
836334	2012 KD_{64}	—	May 23, 2012	Mount Lemmon	Mount Lemmon Survey	GAL	1.3 km	MPC · JPL
836335	2012 LA_{2}	—	June 8, 2012	Sandlot	G. Hug	·	810 m	MPC · JPL
836336	2012 LL_{7}	—	June 1, 2012	Mount Lemmon	Mount Lemmon Survey	·	1.0 km	MPC · JPL
836337	2012 LK_{8}	—	June 12, 2012	Haleakala	Pan-STARRS 1	H	550 m	MPC · JPL
836338	2012 LR_{23}	—	June 14, 2012	Mount Lemmon	Mount Lemmon Survey	·	2.9 km	MPC · JPL
836339	2012 LS_{24}	—	March 30, 2008	Kitt Peak	Spacewatch	·	910 m	MPC · JPL
836340	2012 LO_{25}	—	June 12, 2012	Kitt Peak	Spacewatch	·	2.7 km	MPC · JPL
836341	2012 LS_{27}	—	December 20, 2014	Haleakala	Pan-STARRS 1	PHO	900 m	MPC · JPL
836342	2012 LH_{29}	—	August 12, 2013	Haleakala	Pan-STARRS 1	·	1.9 km	MPC · JPL
836343	2012 LQ_{30}	—	August 2, 2016	Haleakala	Pan-STARRS 1	V	430 m	MPC · JPL
836344	2012 LY_{30}	—	January 3, 2014	Kitt Peak	Spacewatch	·	550 m	MPC · JPL
836345	2012 LL_{32}	—	June 10, 2012	Mount Lemmon	Mount Lemmon Survey	·	960 m	MPC · JPL
836346	2012 LO_{32}	—	June 13, 2012	Haleakala	Pan-STARRS 1	·	720 m	MPC · JPL
836347	2012 LR_{32}	—	June 1, 2012	Mount Lemmon	Mount Lemmon Survey	·	2.2 km	MPC · JPL
836348	2012 LS_{32}	—	June 14, 2012	Mount Lemmon	Mount Lemmon Survey	H	470 m	MPC · JPL
836349	2012 MT_{4}	—	April 26, 2010	WISE	WISE	·	3.6 km	MPC · JPL
836350	2012 MH_{7}	—	April 14, 2010	WISE	WISE	L5	9.4 km	MPC · JPL
836351	2012 MT_{13}	—	April 3, 2008	Kitt Peak	Spacewatch	·	640 m	MPC · JPL
836352	2012 MT_{14}	—	June 16, 2012	Haleakala	Pan-STARRS 1	·	770 m	MPC · JPL
836353	2012 MB_{17}	—	January 21, 2015	Haleakala	Pan-STARRS 1	PHO	830 m	MPC · JPL
836354	2012 MU_{19}	—	June 16, 2012	Mount Lemmon	Mount Lemmon Survey	PHO	790 m	MPC · JPL
836355	2012 NA	—	August 12, 1996	Haleakala	NEAT	·	580 m	MPC · JPL
836356	2012 OQ	—	July 16, 2012	La Sagra	OAM	APO · PHA	150 m	MPC · JPL
836357	2012 PZ_{1}	—	August 8, 2012	Haleakala	Pan-STARRS 1	·	1.3 km	MPC · JPL
836358	2012 PG_{3}	—	June 16, 2010	WISE	WISE	·	1.6 km	MPC · JPL
836359	2012 PX_{5}	—	May 21, 2012	Mount Lemmon	Mount Lemmon Survey	·	1.4 km	MPC · JPL
836360	2012 PO_{6}	—	September 19, 2007	Kitt Peak	Spacewatch	H	410 m	MPC · JPL
836361	2012 PS_{8}	—	August 8, 2012	Haleakala	Pan-STARRS 1	·	1.0 km	MPC · JPL
836362	2012 PW_{12}	—	August 10, 2012	Kitt Peak	Spacewatch	·	1.3 km	MPC · JPL
836363	2012 PP_{14}	—	April 14, 2010	WISE	WISE	EUP	4.6 km	MPC · JPL
836364	2012 PE_{15}	—	August 11, 2012	Mayhill-ISON	L. Elenin	·	960 m	MPC · JPL
836365	2012 PU_{17}	—	August 11, 2012	Haleakala	Pan-STARRS 1	·	940 m	MPC · JPL
836366	2012 PG_{19}	—	August 12, 2012	Haleakala	Pan-STARRS 1	·	1.1 km	MPC · JPL
836367	2012 PC_{21}	—	August 6, 2012	Haleakala	Pan-STARRS 1	·	2.5 km	MPC · JPL
836368	2012 PX_{21}	—	August 6, 2012	Haleakala	Pan-STARRS 1	·	1.4 km	MPC · JPL
836369	2012 PO_{22}	—	August 6, 2012	Haleakala	Pan-STARRS 1	·	430 m	MPC · JPL
836370	2012 PJ_{24}	—	August 11, 2012	Haleakala	Pan-STARRS 1	H	400 m	MPC · JPL
836371	2012 PU_{26}	—	April 2, 2010	WISE	WISE	·	2.7 km	MPC · JPL
836372	2012 PQ_{28}	—	August 15, 2012	Siding Spring	SSS	AMO · APO	770 m	MPC · JPL
836373	2012 PD_{29}	—	May 29, 2010	WISE	WISE	·	2.3 km	MPC · JPL
836374	2012 PS_{29}	—	August 13, 2012	Haleakala	Pan-STARRS 1	KOR	990 m	MPC · JPL
836375	2012 PE_{33}	—	June 21, 2012	Mount Lemmon	Mount Lemmon Survey	·	1.3 km	MPC · JPL
836376	2012 PB_{36}	—	August 13, 2012	Haleakala	Pan-STARRS 1	·	1.9 km	MPC · JPL
836377	2012 PQ_{36}	—	August 13, 2012	Haleakala	Pan-STARRS 1	BAR	970 m	MPC · JPL
836378	2012 PJ_{37}	—	October 1, 2005	Kitt Peak	Spacewatch	NYS	780 m	MPC · JPL
836379	2012 PO_{37}	—	August 14, 2012	Haleakala	Pan-STARRS 1	BAR	1 km	MPC · JPL
836380	2012 PW_{39}	—	August 11, 2012	Siding Spring	SSS	·	1.2 km	MPC · JPL
836381	2012 PR_{40}	—	May 2, 2010	WISE	WISE	·	3.1 km	MPC · JPL
836382	2012 PW_{40}	—	August 10, 2012	Kitt Peak	Spacewatch	·	2.2 km	MPC · JPL
836383	2012 PX_{40}	—	September 23, 2008	Kitt Peak	Spacewatch	·	1.1 km	MPC · JPL
836384	2012 PR_{43}	—	August 14, 2012	Haleakala	Pan-STARRS 1	·	1.1 km	MPC · JPL
836385	2012 PS_{48}	—	August 11, 2012	Haleakala	Pan-STARRS 1	H	390 m	MPC · JPL
836386	2012 PU_{48}	—	August 10, 2012	Kitt Peak	Spacewatch	·	1.1 km	MPC · JPL
836387	2012 PJ_{50}	—	August 13, 2012	Haleakala	Pan-STARRS 1	·	2.0 km	MPC · JPL
836388	2012 PV_{50}	—	April 17, 2015	Cerro Tololo	DECam	·	1.4 km	MPC · JPL
836389	2012 PR_{51}	—	August 13, 2012	Haleakala	Pan-STARRS 1	EUN	700 m	MPC · JPL
836390	2012 PO_{52}	—	August 12, 2012	Siding Spring	SSS	JUN	720 m	MPC · JPL
836391	2012 PW_{52}	—	August 14, 2012	Siding Spring	SSS	H	350 m	MPC · JPL
836392	2012 PA_{54}	—	August 14, 2012	Siding Spring	SSS	·	2.1 km	MPC · JPL
836393	2012 PD_{54}	—	August 9, 2012	Haleakala	Pan-STARRS 1	·	1.3 km	MPC · JPL
836394	2012 PF_{54}	—	August 13, 2012	Kitt Peak	Spacewatch	·	1.6 km	MPC · JPL
836395	2012 PO_{54}	—	August 14, 2012	Kitt Peak	Spacewatch	EOS	1.4 km	MPC · JPL
836396	2012 PG_{56}	—	August 13, 2012	Haleakala	Pan-STARRS 1	·	700 m	MPC · JPL
836397	2012 PC_{57}	—	August 14, 2012	Haleakala	Pan-STARRS 1	ADE	1.7 km	MPC · JPL
836398	2012 PZ_{57}	—	August 10, 2012	Kitt Peak	Spacewatch	·	1.9 km	MPC · JPL
836399	2012 PP_{58}	—	August 14, 2012	Siding Spring	SSS	JUN	820 m	MPC · JPL
836400	2012 PB_{59}	—	August 14, 2012	Siding Spring	SSS	·	1.2 km	MPC · JPL

== 836401–836500 ==
back to top

Designation			Discovery			Properties		Ref
Permanent	Provisional	Named after	Date	Site	Discoverer(s)	Category	Diam.	Ref
836401	2012 PR_{59}	—	August 13, 2012	Haleakala	Pan-STARRS 1	·	1.0 km	MPC · JPL
836402	2012 PT_{59}	—	August 13, 2012	Kitt Peak	Spacewatch	·	870 m	MPC · JPL
836403	2012 PB_{60}	—	August 13, 2012	Haleakala	Pan-STARRS 1	·	1.2 km	MPC · JPL
836404	2012 PW_{63}	—	August 13, 2012	Haleakala	Pan-STARRS 1	·	2.3 km	MPC · JPL
836405	2012 QS_{6}	—	August 17, 2012	Haleakala	Pan-STARRS 1	·	980 m	MPC · JPL
836406	2012 QL_{8}	—	August 17, 2012	Haleakala	Pan-STARRS 1	·	1.3 km	MPC · JPL
836407	2012 QN_{8}	—	August 17, 2012	Haleakala	Pan-STARRS 1	HNS	820 m	MPC · JPL
836408	2012 QH_{9}	—	October 29, 2002	Sacramento Peak	SDSS	·	770 m	MPC · JPL
836409	2012 QY_{9}	—	August 20, 2012	Sandlot	G. Hug	·	1.3 km	MPC · JPL
836410	2012 QC_{10}	—	May 29, 2012	Mount Lemmon	Mount Lemmon Survey	·	1.8 km	MPC · JPL
836411	2012 QO_{10}	—	August 17, 2012	Haleakala	Pan-STARRS 1	APO	580 m	MPC · JPL
836412	2012 QO_{16}	—	November 26, 2005	Catalina	CSS	·	710 m	MPC · JPL
836413	2012 QA_{19}	—	August 21, 2012	Haleakala	Pan-STARRS 1	·	1.2 km	MPC · JPL
836414	2012 QN_{20}	—	September 7, 1999	Catalina	CSS	·	1.5 km	MPC · JPL
836415	2012 QA_{21}	—	August 24, 2012	Kitt Peak	Spacewatch	·	1.3 km	MPC · JPL
836416	2012 QY_{22}	—	August 24, 2012	Kitt Peak	Spacewatch	LIX	2.2 km	MPC · JPL
836417	2012 QM_{24}	—	August 24, 2012	Kitt Peak	Spacewatch	H	360 m	MPC · JPL
836418	2012 QN_{25}	—	August 24, 2012	Kitt Peak	Spacewatch	·	950 m	MPC · JPL
836419	2012 QB_{29}	—	August 24, 2012	Haleakala	Pan-STARRS 1	·	2.7 km	MPC · JPL
836420	2012 QX_{29}	—	August 14, 2012	Haleakala	Pan-STARRS 1	·	1.5 km	MPC · JPL
836421	2012 QZ_{32}	—	October 12, 2007	Mount Lemmon	Mount Lemmon Survey	·	1.4 km	MPC · JPL
836422	2012 QF_{33}	—	October 31, 2008	Kitt Peak	Spacewatch	·	1.2 km	MPC · JPL
836423	2012 QM_{33}	—	August 10, 2012	Kitt Peak	Spacewatch	EUN	880 m	MPC · JPL
836424	2012 QS_{34}	—	August 25, 2012	Kitt Peak	Spacewatch	ULA	3.2 km	MPC · JPL
836425	2012 QK_{36}	—	October 31, 2008	Kitt Peak	Spacewatch	·	890 m	MPC · JPL
836426	2012 QK_{37}	—	August 20, 2003	Campo Imperatore	CINEOS	·	1.4 km	MPC · JPL
836427	2012 QK_{38}	—	August 25, 2012	Haleakala	Pan-STARRS 1	(21344)	1.3 km	MPC · JPL
836428	2012 QF_{43}	—	August 17, 2012	ESA OGS	ESA OGS	·	1.4 km	MPC · JPL
836429	2012 QY_{53}	—	February 16, 2010	Kitt Peak	Spacewatch	HNS	810 m	MPC · JPL
836430	2012 QP_{55}	—	May 4, 2010	WISE	WISE	EUP	3.7 km	MPC · JPL
836431	2012 QT_{55}	—	August 24, 2012	Kitt Peak	Spacewatch	·	490 m	MPC · JPL
836432	2012 QY_{55}	—	August 26, 2012	Haleakala	Pan-STARRS 1	DOR	1.7 km	MPC · JPL
836433	2012 QW_{58}	—	August 26, 2012	Haleakala	Pan-STARRS 1	·	1.0 km	MPC · JPL
836434	2012 QH_{59}	—	January 8, 2017	Mount Lemmon	Mount Lemmon Survey	·	450 m	MPC · JPL
836435	2012 QQ_{59}	—	December 11, 2013	Haleakala	Pan-STARRS 1	·	1.1 km	MPC · JPL
836436	2012 QC_{62}	—	February 23, 2018	Mount Lemmon	Mount Lemmon Survey	V	470 m	MPC · JPL
836437	2012 QH_{65}	—	August 26, 2012	Haleakala	Pan-STARRS 1	·	1.0 km	MPC · JPL
836438	2012 QG_{66}	—	August 18, 2012	ESA OGS	ESA OGS	·	1.2 km	MPC · JPL
836439	2012 QF_{67}	—	August 26, 2012	Haleakala	Pan-STARRS 1	MAR	500 m	MPC · JPL
836440	2012 QK_{67}	—	August 26, 2012	Kitt Peak	Spacewatch	·	1.4 km	MPC · JPL
836441	2012 QV_{67}	—	August 24, 2012	Kitt Peak	Spacewatch	·	960 m	MPC · JPL
836442	2012 QD_{69}	—	August 24, 2012	Kitt Peak	Spacewatch	·	830 m	MPC · JPL
836443	2012 QV_{69}	—	August 25, 2012	Mount Lemmon	Mount Lemmon Survey	·	440 m	MPC · JPL
836444	2012 QY_{69}	—	August 25, 2012	Kitt Peak	Spacewatch	L5	6.6 km	MPC · JPL
836445	2012 QL_{71}	—	August 17, 2012	Haleakala	Pan-STARRS 1	·	1.4 km	MPC · JPL
836446	2012 QZ_{71}	—	August 25, 2012	Mount Lemmon	Mount Lemmon Survey	·	1.1 km	MPC · JPL
836447	2012 QB_{72}	—	August 19, 2012	Siding Spring	SSS	·	1.4 km	MPC · JPL
836448	2012 QR_{72}	—	August 16, 2012	ESA OGS	ESA OGS	·	1.0 km	MPC · JPL
836449	2012 QV_{72}	—	August 21, 2012	Haleakala	Pan-STARRS 1	·	1.1 km	MPC · JPL
836450	2012 QB_{73}	—	August 17, 2012	Haleakala	Pan-STARRS 1	·	1.4 km	MPC · JPL
836451	2012 QE_{73}	—	August 17, 2012	Haleakala	Pan-STARRS 1	·	1 km	MPC · JPL
836452	2012 QN_{73}	—	August 26, 2012	Haleakala	Pan-STARRS 1	·	1.2 km	MPC · JPL
836453	2012 QV_{73}	—	August 22, 2012	Haleakala	Pan-STARRS 1	·	1.1 km	MPC · JPL
836454	2012 QZ_{73}	—	August 19, 2012	Siding Spring	SSS	·	960 m	MPC · JPL
836455	2012 QL_{74}	—	August 24, 2012	Kitt Peak	Spacewatch	·	910 m	MPC · JPL
836456	2012 QB_{75}	—	August 26, 2012	Haleakala	Pan-STARRS 1	·	1.0 km	MPC · JPL
836457	2012 QX_{75}	—	August 16, 2012	ESA OGS	ESA OGS	·	2.2 km	MPC · JPL
836458	2012 QO_{76}	—	August 17, 2012	ESA OGS	ESA OGS	·	2.2 km	MPC · JPL
836459	2012 RL_{1}	—	August 14, 2012	Haleakala	Pan-STARRS 1	·	1.5 km	MPC · JPL
836460	2012 RP_{4}	—	September 8, 2012	Alder Springs	K. Levin, N. Teamo	·	430 m	MPC · JPL
836461	2012 RA_{7}	—	September 29, 2008	Catalina	CSS	·	960 m	MPC · JPL
836462	2012 RU_{8}	—	August 26, 2012	Kitt Peak	Spacewatch	·	1.1 km	MPC · JPL
836463	2012 RN_{9}	—	September 12, 2012	Alder Springs	K. Levin, N. Teamo	AGN	870 m	MPC · JPL
836464	2012 RD_{11}	—	September 22, 2003	Kitt Peak	Spacewatch	·	1.5 km	MPC · JPL
836465 Kulmatycki	2012 RY_{11}	Kulmatycki	September 11, 2012	Tincana	M. Kusiak, M. Żołnowski	·	1.0 km	MPC · JPL
836466	2012 RB_{13}	—	October 20, 2007	Mount Lemmon	Mount Lemmon Survey	·	1.4 km	MPC · JPL
836467	2012 RF_{17}	—	August 11, 2012	Siding Spring	SSS	·	1.3 km	MPC · JPL
836468	2012 RH_{17}	—	June 4, 2011	Mount Lemmon	Mount Lemmon Survey	·	2.4 km	MPC · JPL
836469	2012 RW_{19}	—	August 14, 2012	Haleakala	Pan-STARRS 1	·	1.3 km	MPC · JPL
836470	2012 RF_{31}	—	September 14, 2012	Catalina	CSS	·	1.5 km	MPC · JPL
836471	2012 RL_{33}	—	September 15, 2012	Catalina	CSS	·	1.3 km	MPC · JPL
836472	2012 RC_{34}	—	October 19, 2003	Kitt Peak	Spacewatch	·	1.2 km	MPC · JPL
836473	2012 RN_{34}	—	March 20, 1999	Sacramento Peak	SDSS	·	2.5 km	MPC · JPL
836474	2012 RG_{36}	—	January 17, 2010	WISE	WISE	·	3.0 km	MPC · JPL
836475	2012 RF_{37}	—	September 13, 2012	Mount Lemmon	Mount Lemmon Survey	·	1.4 km	MPC · JPL
836476	2012 RM_{45}	—	April 29, 2010	WISE	WISE	PHO	1.0 km	MPC · JPL
836477	2012 RS_{45}	—	September 12, 2012	Siding Spring	SSS	·	1.4 km	MPC · JPL
836478	2012 RE_{48}	—	September 6, 2012	Mount Lemmon	Mount Lemmon Survey	EOS	1.2 km	MPC · JPL
836479	2012 RF_{49}	—	September 15, 2012	Mount Lemmon	Mount Lemmon Survey	·	1.3 km	MPC · JPL
836480	2012 RR_{49}	—	September 6, 2012	Haleakala	Pan-STARRS 1	H	460 m	MPC · JPL
836481	2012 SK	—	September 16, 2012	Wildberg	R. Apitzsch	·	530 m	MPC · JPL
836482	2012 SL_{1}	—	September 16, 2012	Mount Lemmon	Mount Lemmon Survey	·	2.3 km	MPC · JPL
836483	2012 SF_{5}	—	August 25, 2012	Catalina	CSS	·	1.1 km	MPC · JPL
836484	2012 SC_{6}	—	September 14, 2012	Catalina	CSS	·	1.4 km	MPC · JPL
836485	2012 SG_{6}	—	September 16, 2012	La Sagra	OAM	·	930 m	MPC · JPL
836486	2012 SJ_{7}	—	September 16, 2012	Catalina	CSS	·	1.5 km	MPC · JPL
836487	2012 SE_{8}	—	December 19, 2001	Sacramento Peak	SDSS	PHO	810 m	MPC · JPL
836488	2012 SE_{10}	—	August 25, 2012	Kitt Peak	Spacewatch	·	1.2 km	MPC · JPL
836489	2012 SO_{11}	—	September 16, 2012	Kitt Peak	Spacewatch	·	1.2 km	MPC · JPL
836490	2012 SE_{13}	—	September 19, 2001	Socorro	LINEAR	·	2.0 km	MPC · JPL
836491	2012 SA_{20}	—	August 26, 2012	Haleakala	Pan-STARRS 1	L5	6.5 km	MPC · JPL
836492	2012 SO_{21}	—	September 17, 2012	Mount Lemmon	Mount Lemmon Survey	·	1.2 km	MPC · JPL
836493	2012 SY_{24}	—	March 20, 1999	Sacramento Peak	SDSS	·	1.3 km	MPC · JPL
836494	2012 SD_{27}	—	September 18, 2012	Mount Lemmon	Mount Lemmon Survey	·	500 m	MPC · JPL
836495	2012 SG_{33}	—	September 18, 2012	Mount Lemmon	Mount Lemmon Survey	·	2.3 km	MPC · JPL
836496	2012 SX_{33}	—	August 26, 2012	Haleakala	Pan-STARRS 1	·	1.0 km	MPC · JPL
836497	2012 SL_{35}	—	August 26, 2012	Haleakala	Pan-STARRS 1	AEO	710 m	MPC · JPL
836498	2012 SJ_{37}	—	August 26, 2012	Haleakala	Pan-STARRS 1	·	930 m	MPC · JPL
836499	2012 SX_{38}	—	September 18, 2012	Mount Lemmon	Mount Lemmon Survey	AGN	810 m	MPC · JPL
836500	2012 SK_{41}	—	September 18, 2012	Mount Lemmon	Mount Lemmon Survey	·	1.3 km	MPC · JPL

== 836501–836600 ==
back to top

Designation			Discovery			Properties		Ref
Permanent	Provisional	Named after	Date	Site	Discoverer(s)	Category	Diam.	Ref
836501	2012 SV_{43}	—	November 12, 2001	Sacramento Peak	SDSS	·	2.4 km	MPC · JPL
836502	2012 SY_{47}	—	November 23, 2009	Kitt Peak	Spacewatch	·	450 m	MPC · JPL
836503	2012 SQ_{48}	—	September 23, 2012	Mount Lemmon	Mount Lemmon Survey	·	510 m	MPC · JPL
836504	2012 SP_{49}	—	October 2, 2008	Kitt Peak	Spacewatch	·	1.0 km	MPC · JPL
836505	2012 SQ_{50}	—	October 5, 2002	Sacramento Peak	SDSS	·	2.5 km	MPC · JPL
836506	2012 SU_{54}	—	August 28, 2012	Mount Lemmon	Mount Lemmon Survey	·	530 m	MPC · JPL
836507	2012 SE_{57}	—	September 25, 2012	Mount Lemmon	Mount Lemmon Survey	H	310 m	MPC · JPL
836508	2012 SR_{57}	—	September 26, 2012	Oukaïmeden	C. Rinner	·	1.1 km	MPC · JPL
836509	2012 SH_{59}	—	October 22, 2003	Sacramento Peak	SDSS	·	1.5 km	MPC · JPL
836510	2012 SQ_{59}	—	September 17, 2012	Mount Lemmon	Mount Lemmon Survey	EUN	900 m	MPC · JPL
836511	2012 SW_{59}	—	September 19, 2003	Campo Imperatore	CINEOS	MRX	840 m	MPC · JPL
836512	2012 SX_{60}	—	September 18, 2012	Mount Lemmon	Mount Lemmon Survey	·	2.3 km	MPC · JPL
836513	2012 SP_{63}	—	August 22, 2003	Socorro	LINEAR	·	1.5 km	MPC · JPL
836514	2012 SQ_{63}	—	July 20, 2003	Palomar	NEAT	·	1.8 km	MPC · JPL
836515	2012 SP_{65}	—	October 30, 2007	Kitt Peak	Spacewatch	·	1.5 km	MPC · JPL
836516	2012 SQ_{67}	—	September 17, 2012	Mount Lemmon	Mount Lemmon Survey	EUN	910 m	MPC · JPL
836517	2012 SQ_{68}	—	October 5, 2002	Sacramento Peak	SDSS	KOR	1.2 km	MPC · JPL
836518	2012 SB_{74}	—	September 16, 2012	Catalina	CSS	·	550 m	MPC · JPL
836519	2012 SR_{76}	—	September 14, 2007	Kitt Peak	Spacewatch	·	1.3 km	MPC · JPL
836520	2012 SV_{76}	—	September 24, 2012	Mount Lemmon	Mount Lemmon Survey	·	1.3 km	MPC · JPL
836521	2012 SO_{82}	—	August 1, 2000	Cerro Tololo	Deep Ecliptic Survey	·	2.3 km	MPC · JPL
836522	2012 SJ_{83}	—	September 16, 2012	Kitt Peak	Spacewatch	·	600 m	MPC · JPL
836523	2012 ST_{83}	—	September 19, 2012	Mount Lemmon	Mount Lemmon Survey	·	810 m	MPC · JPL
836524	2012 SW_{83}	—	September 26, 2012	Mount Lemmon	Mount Lemmon Survey	·	750 m	MPC · JPL
836525	2012 SU_{86}	—	August 26, 2012	Haleakala	Pan-STARRS 1	·	1.3 km	MPC · JPL
836526	2012 SR_{87}	—	September 16, 2012	Kitt Peak	Spacewatch	·	1.1 km	MPC · JPL
836527	2012 SZ_{87}	—	September 22, 2003	Anderson Mesa	LONEOS	·	1.2 km	MPC · JPL
836528	2012 SN_{88}	—	September 27, 2003	Kitt Peak	Spacewatch	·	800 m	MPC · JPL
836529	2012 SH_{90}	—	September 21, 2012	Mount Lemmon	Mount Lemmon Survey	·	1.3 km	MPC · JPL
836530	2012 SQ_{90}	—	September 24, 2012	Mount Lemmon	Mount Lemmon Survey	·	1.6 km	MPC · JPL
836531	2012 SN_{91}	—	September 26, 2012	Mount Lemmon	Mount Lemmon Survey	MRX	720 m	MPC · JPL
836532	2012 SQ_{91}	—	September 21, 2012	Kitt Peak	Spacewatch	LIX	2.0 km	MPC · JPL
836533	2012 SC_{92}	—	September 24, 2012	Mount Lemmon	Mount Lemmon Survey	·	830 m	MPC · JPL
836534	2012 SD_{92}	—	September 25, 2012	Mount Lemmon	Mount Lemmon Survey	L5	6.1 km	MPC · JPL
836535	2012 SY_{92}	—	September 15, 2012	Catalina	CSS	·	1.4 km	MPC · JPL
836536	2012 SA_{95}	—	October 27, 2017	Haleakala	Pan-STARRS 1	AGN	850 m	MPC · JPL
836537	2012 SK_{96}	—	April 20, 2020	Haleakala	Pan-STARRS 1	·	1.2 km	MPC · JPL
836538	2012 SZ_{96}	—	September 21, 2012	Kitt Peak	Spacewatch	·	950 m	MPC · JPL
836539	2012 SE_{97}	—	September 12, 2012	Siding Spring	SSS	·	1.2 km	MPC · JPL
836540	2012 SG_{98}	—	September 16, 2012	Mount Lemmon	Mount Lemmon Survey	JUN	680 m	MPC · JPL
836541	2012 SP_{98}	—	September 16, 2012	ESA OGS	ESA OGS	·	1.2 km	MPC · JPL
836542	2012 SU_{98}	—	September 17, 2012	Mount Lemmon	Mount Lemmon Survey	·	1.0 km	MPC · JPL
836543	2012 SR_{100}	—	September 22, 2012	Mount Lemmon	Mount Lemmon Survey	EOS	1.3 km	MPC · JPL
836544	2012 SG_{101}	—	September 21, 2012	Mount Lemmon	Mount Lemmon Survey	·	480 m	MPC · JPL
836545	2012 SV_{101}	—	September 21, 2012	Kitt Peak	Spacewatch	L5	7.0 km	MPC · JPL
836546	2012 SN_{102}	—	September 24, 2012	Mount Lemmon	Mount Lemmon Survey	·	470 m	MPC · JPL
836547	2012 SV_{102}	—	September 21, 2012	Catalina	CSS	·	530 m	MPC · JPL
836548	2012 TR_{4}	—	October 5, 2012	Haleakala	Pan-STARRS 1	H	460 m	MPC · JPL
836549	2012 TD_{8}	—	September 23, 2008	Kitt Peak	Spacewatch	·	940 m	MPC · JPL
836550	2012 TE_{8}	—	January 7, 2009	Kitt Peak	Spacewatch	VER	2.0 km	MPC · JPL
836551	2012 TJ_{11}	—	October 6, 2012	Mount Lemmon	Mount Lemmon Survey	·	1.0 km	MPC · JPL
836552	2012 TC_{14}	—	January 15, 2009	Kitt Peak	Spacewatch	·	1.7 km	MPC · JPL
836553	2012 TV_{19}	—	October 8, 2012	Mount Lemmon	Mount Lemmon Survey	ADE	1.3 km	MPC · JPL
836554	2012 TB_{22}	—	November 25, 2005	Kitt Peak	Spacewatch	MAS	520 m	MPC · JPL
836555	2012 TE_{23}	—	October 8, 2012	SM Montmagastrell	Bosch, J. M., Olivera, R. M.	·	810 m	MPC · JPL
836556	2012 TK_{24}	—	September 20, 2003	Kitt Peak	Spacewatch	·	1.1 km	MPC · JPL
836557	2012 TO_{24}	—	March 19, 2010	Kitt Peak	Spacewatch	·	2.4 km	MPC · JPL
836558	2012 TE_{25}	—	October 8, 2012	Haleakala	Pan-STARRS 1	·	1.3 km	MPC · JPL
836559	2012 TV_{27}	—	March 1, 2009	Kitt Peak	Spacewatch	·	3.1 km	MPC · JPL
836560	2012 TB_{40}	—	October 8, 2012	Mount Lemmon	Mount Lemmon Survey	·	1.3 km	MPC · JPL
836561	2012 TB_{44}	—	June 25, 2010	WISE	WISE	·	2.6 km	MPC · JPL
836562	2012 TY_{44}	—	October 3, 2002	Palomar	NEAT	·	2.7 km	MPC · JPL
836563	2012 TK_{47}	—	October 8, 2012	Haleakala	Pan-STARRS 1	·	1.8 km	MPC · JPL
836564	2012 TM_{50}	—	September 15, 2012	ESA OGS	ESA OGS	·	1.3 km	MPC · JPL
836565	2012 TP_{50}	—	September 15, 2012	Kitt Peak	Spacewatch	·	820 m	MPC · JPL
836566	2012 TF_{52}	—	October 8, 2012	Mount Lemmon	Mount Lemmon Survey	L5	5.9 km	MPC · JPL
836567	2012 TT_{58}	—	October 7, 2012	Haleakala	Pan-STARRS 1	NYS	820 m	MPC · JPL
836568	2012 TG_{59}	—	September 16, 2012	Kitt Peak	Spacewatch	·	1.9 km	MPC · JPL
836569	2012 TL_{62}	—	August 25, 2003	Palomar	NEAT	·	1.2 km	MPC · JPL
836570	2012 TJ_{72}	—	October 9, 2012	Mount Lemmon	Mount Lemmon Survey	EUN	990 m	MPC · JPL
836571	2012 TS_{75}	—	September 16, 2012	Kitt Peak	Spacewatch	·	1.2 km	MPC · JPL
836572	2012 TV_{76}	—	June 24, 2010	WISE	WISE	TRE	2.1 km	MPC · JPL
836573	2012 TD_{77}	—	March 12, 2007	Kitt Peak	Spacewatch	·	500 m	MPC · JPL
836574	2012 TO_{78}	—	September 24, 2005	Kitt Peak	Spacewatch	·	460 m	MPC · JPL
836575	2012 TB_{83}	—	October 6, 2012	Mount Lemmon	Mount Lemmon Survey	·	750 m	MPC · JPL
836576	2012 TU_{84}	—	April 8, 2010	WISE	WISE	L5	5.9 km	MPC · JPL
836577	2012 TY_{84}	—	October 6, 2012	Mount Lemmon	Mount Lemmon Survey	·	490 m	MPC · JPL
836578	2012 TJ_{85}	—	October 6, 2012	Mount Lemmon	Mount Lemmon Survey	AGN	790 m	MPC · JPL
836579	2012 TP_{86}	—	October 6, 2012	Mount Lemmon	Mount Lemmon Survey	·	1.3 km	MPC · JPL
836580	2012 TO_{87}	—	October 20, 2003	Kitt Peak	Spacewatch	·	1.0 km	MPC · JPL
836581	2012 TP_{87}	—	August 23, 2003	Palomar	NEAT	·	1.1 km	MPC · JPL
836582	2012 TC_{93}	—	October 7, 2012	Haleakala	Pan-STARRS 1	·	2.0 km	MPC · JPL
836583	2012 TC_{94}	—	October 7, 2012	Haleakala	Pan-STARRS 1	·	1.3 km	MPC · JPL
836584	2012 TO_{94}	—	October 8, 2012	Mayhill-ISON	L. Elenin	·	1.6 km	MPC · JPL
836585	2012 TW_{96}	—	October 8, 2012	Kitt Peak	Spacewatch	·	1.1 km	MPC · JPL
836586	2012 TE_{99}	—	October 8, 2012	Kitt Peak	Spacewatch	·	1.3 km	MPC · JPL
836587	2012 TJ_{99}	—	October 8, 2012	Kitt Peak	Spacewatch	·	1.2 km	MPC · JPL
836588	2012 TU_{99}	—	October 14, 2001	Sacramento Peak	SDSS	HYG	2.2 km	MPC · JPL
836589	2012 TG_{100}	—	January 20, 2004	Cerro Paranal	E. Tedesco, M. Granvik	·	3.1 km	MPC · JPL
836590	2012 TM_{102}	—	October 9, 2012	Mount Lemmon	Mount Lemmon Survey	·	1.2 km	MPC · JPL
836591	2012 TR_{103}	—	October 9, 2012	Mount Lemmon	Mount Lemmon Survey	·	840 m	MPC · JPL
836592	2012 TK_{107}	—	October 10, 2012	Mount Lemmon	Mount Lemmon Survey	·	2.4 km	MPC · JPL
836593	2012 TL_{108}	—	October 10, 2012	Mount Lemmon	Mount Lemmon Survey	·	930 m	MPC · JPL
836594	2012 TA_{109}	—	October 10, 2012	Mount Lemmon	Mount Lemmon Survey	·	1.0 km	MPC · JPL
836595	2012 TN_{117}	—	October 10, 2012	Mount Lemmon	Mount Lemmon Survey	·	1.4 km	MPC · JPL
836596	2012 TW_{118}	—	September 25, 2012	Kitt Peak	Spacewatch	·	1.3 km	MPC · JPL
836597	2012 TD_{121}	—	January 7, 2006	Kitt Peak	Spacewatch	·	940 m	MPC · JPL
836598	2012 TF_{122}	—	October 10, 2012	Mount Lemmon	Mount Lemmon Survey	·	1.2 km	MPC · JPL
836599	2012 TA_{123}	—	July 28, 2011	Haleakala	Pan-STARRS 1	L5	6.2 km	MPC · JPL
836600	2012 TH_{127}	—	October 6, 2012	Haleakala	Pan-STARRS 1	H	390 m	MPC · JPL

== 836601–836700 ==
back to top

Designation			Discovery			Properties		Ref
Permanent	Provisional	Named after	Date	Site	Discoverer(s)	Category	Diam.	Ref
836601	2012 TY_{128}	—	September 21, 2012	Mount Lemmon SkyCe	T. Vorobjov, Kostin, A.	H	430 m	MPC · JPL
836602	2012 TX_{129}	—	October 8, 2012	Haleakala	Pan-STARRS 1	·	420 m	MPC · JPL
836603	2012 TZ_{130}	—	October 23, 2008	Mount Lemmon	Mount Lemmon Survey	·	1.3 km	MPC · JPL
836604	2012 TO_{135}	—	September 15, 2012	Kitt Peak	Spacewatch	·	480 m	MPC · JPL
836605	2012 TA_{136}	—	October 7, 2012	Haleakala	Pan-STARRS 1	·	1.7 km	MPC · JPL
836606	2012 TH_{138}	—	October 8, 2012	Haleakala	Pan-STARRS 1	·	550 m	MPC · JPL
836607	2012 TP_{150}	—	June 6, 2010	WISE	WISE	T_{j} (2.99)	4.4 km	MPC · JPL
836608	2012 TZ_{152}	—	October 8, 2012	Haleakala	Pan-STARRS 1	·	1.1 km	MPC · JPL
836609	2012 TW_{155}	—	October 8, 2012	Haleakala	Pan-STARRS 1	·	1.1 km	MPC · JPL
836610	2012 TH_{157}	—	October 5, 2012	Mount Lemmon	Mount Lemmon Survey	·	1.4 km	MPC · JPL
836611	2012 TH_{161}	—	October 8, 2012	Mount Lemmon	Mount Lemmon Survey	·	590 m	MPC · JPL
836612	2012 TQ_{164}	—	October 8, 2012	Haleakala	Pan-STARRS 1	·	1.1 km	MPC · JPL
836613	2012 TH_{166}	—	October 16, 2001	Palomar	NEAT	·	3.0 km	MPC · JPL
836614	2012 TL_{172}	—	September 24, 2012	Kitt Peak	Spacewatch	·	1.2 km	MPC · JPL
836615	2012 TN_{172}	—	March 20, 1999	Sacramento Peak	SDSS	·	2.2 km	MPC · JPL
836616	2012 TX_{173}	—	October 9, 2012	Mount Lemmon	Mount Lemmon Survey	AGN	920 m	MPC · JPL
836617	2012 TR_{174}	—	September 25, 2012	Kitt Peak	Spacewatch	·	1.4 km	MPC · JPL
836618	2012 TN_{193}	—	October 10, 2012	Kitt Peak	Spacewatch	·	780 m	MPC · JPL
836619	2012 TB_{198}	—	October 11, 2012	Bergisch Gladbach	W. Bickel	·	550 m	MPC · JPL
836620	2012 TQ_{198}	—	January 7, 2006	Kitt Peak	Spacewatch	·	800 m	MPC · JPL
836621	2012 TS_{198}	—	August 24, 2007	Kitt Peak	Spacewatch	·	1.7 km	MPC · JPL
836622	2012 TO_{200}	—	October 11, 2012	Mount Lemmon	Mount Lemmon Survey	·	1.3 km	MPC · JPL
836623	2012 TS_{202}	—	August 2, 2011	Haleakala	Pan-STARRS 1	L5	5.2 km	MPC · JPL
836624	2012 TY_{203}	—	November 11, 2001	Sacramento Peak	SDSS	·	2.2 km	MPC · JPL
836625	2012 TM_{213}	—	October 11, 2012	Haleakala	Pan-STARRS 1	·	1.2 km	MPC · JPL
836626	2012 TB_{214}	—	October 11, 2012	Haleakala	Pan-STARRS 1	·	2.8 km	MPC · JPL
836627	2012 TP_{216}	—	October 13, 2012	Kitt Peak	Spacewatch	·	1.2 km	MPC · JPL
836628	2012 TS_{216}	—	September 15, 2012	Kitt Peak	Spacewatch	·	1.1 km	MPC · JPL
836629	2012 TG_{220}	—	March 21, 2009	Kitt Peak	Spacewatch	·	2.2 km	MPC · JPL
836630	2012 TH_{228}	—	October 15, 2012	Mount Lemmon	Mount Lemmon Survey	·	1.1 km	MPC · JPL
836631	2012 TU_{229}	—	October 9, 2012	Mount Lemmon	Mount Lemmon Survey	·	1.1 km	MPC · JPL
836632	2012 TS_{230}	—	October 14, 2012	Kislovodsk	ISON-Kislovodsk Observatory	·	2.1 km	MPC · JPL
836633	2012 TB_{239}	—	October 7, 2012	Haleakala	Pan-STARRS 1	·	1.5 km	MPC · JPL
836634	2012 TA_{245}	—	October 11, 2012	Mount Lemmon	Mount Lemmon Survey	·	1.1 km	MPC · JPL
836635	2012 TB_{245}	—	October 1, 2008	Kitt Peak	Spacewatch	(5)	800 m	MPC · JPL
836636	2012 TH_{248}	—	October 11, 2012	Haleakala	Pan-STARRS 1	·	1.3 km	MPC · JPL
836637	2012 TR_{248}	—	March 18, 2010	Kitt Peak	Spacewatch	·	1.4 km	MPC · JPL
836638	2012 TF_{254}	—	October 11, 2012	Piszkés-tető	K. Sárneczky, T. Vorobjov	·	1.4 km	MPC · JPL
836639	2012 TT_{257}	—	September 23, 2012	Kitt Peak	Spacewatch	·	1.0 km	MPC · JPL
836640	2012 TS_{263}	—	October 8, 2012	Mount Lemmon	Mount Lemmon Survey	·	2.4 km	MPC · JPL
836641	2012 TU_{263}	—	October 8, 2012	Mount Lemmon	Mount Lemmon Survey	LUT	2.8 km	MPC · JPL
836642	2012 TJ_{266}	—	October 10, 2002	Sacramento Peak	SDSS	KOR	1.2 km	MPC · JPL
836643	2012 TS_{266}	—	October 8, 2012	Haleakala	Pan-STARRS 1	·	1.3 km	MPC · JPL
836644	2012 TK_{269}	—	May 16, 2010	WISE	WISE	T_{j} (2.98)	3.2 km	MPC · JPL
836645	2012 TO_{269}	—	October 11, 2012	Mount Lemmon	Mount Lemmon Survey	·	740 m	MPC · JPL
836646	2012 TY_{273}	—	October 15, 2012	Mount Lemmon	Mount Lemmon Survey	·	1.1 km	MPC · JPL
836647	2012 TY_{274}	—	September 21, 2012	Kitt Peak	Spacewatch	·	800 m	MPC · JPL
836648	2012 TX_{276}	—	October 11, 2012	Kitt Peak	Spacewatch	·	1.1 km	MPC · JPL
836649	2012 TZ_{276}	—	September 17, 2012	Kitt Peak	Spacewatch	·	920 m	MPC · JPL
836650	2012 TL_{278}	—	October 11, 2012	Haleakala	Pan-STARRS 1	·	1.3 km	MPC · JPL
836651	2012 TX_{280}	—	September 16, 2003	Kitt Peak	Spacewatch	·	920 m	MPC · JPL
836652	2012 TG_{283}	—	October 14, 2012	Mount Lemmon	Mount Lemmon Survey	·	1.6 km	MPC · JPL
836653	2012 TL_{283}	—	October 15, 2012	Kitt Peak	Spacewatch	·	1.5 km	MPC · JPL
836654	2012 TM_{288}	—	October 10, 2012	Mount Lemmon	Mount Lemmon Survey	·	2.0 km	MPC · JPL
836655	2012 TZ_{290}	—	September 18, 2012	Mount Lemmon	Mount Lemmon Survey	·	950 m	MPC · JPL
836656	2012 TL_{293}	—	October 14, 2012	Kitt Peak	Spacewatch	·	1.0 km	MPC · JPL
836657	2012 TG_{295}	—	September 7, 2008	Mount Lemmon	Mount Lemmon Survey	MAS	520 m	MPC · JPL
836658	2012 TQ_{297}	—	October 7, 2012	Kitt Peak	Spacewatch	T_{j} (2.98) · EUP	3.3 km	MPC · JPL
836659	2012 TE_{305}	—	October 23, 2001	Bro	Uppsala-DLR Asteroid Survey	·	2.7 km	MPC · JPL
836660	2012 TS_{308}	—	August 26, 2012	Haleakala	Pan-STARRS 1	·	890 m	MPC · JPL
836661	2012 TO_{312}	—	October 14, 2012	Kitt Peak	Spacewatch	·	890 m	MPC · JPL
836662	2012 TX_{312}	—	September 14, 2012	Mount Lemmon	Mount Lemmon Survey	·	1.5 km	MPC · JPL
836663	2012 TK_{314}	—	September 13, 2002	Palomar	NEAT	·	490 m	MPC · JPL
836664	2012 TZ_{316}	—	September 11, 2012	Siding Spring	SSS	·	550 m	MPC · JPL
836665	2012 TD_{319}	—	September 15, 2012	Catalina	CSS	·	1.4 km	MPC · JPL
836666	2012 TD_{324}	—	October 6, 2012	Haleakala	M. Holman, W. Fraser, P. Lacerda, M.Payne	plutino	193 km	MPC · JPL
836667	2012 TH_{324}	—	October 24, 2013	Mount Lemmon	Mount Lemmon Survey	L5	5.7 km	MPC · JPL
836668	2012 TJ_{324}	—	January 12, 2015	Haleakala	Pan-STARRS 1	L5	6.8 km	MPC · JPL
836669	2012 TL_{324}	—	November 9, 2013	Mount Lemmon	Mount Lemmon Survey	L5	6.7 km	MPC · JPL
836670	2012 TV_{328}	—	September 26, 2012	Mount Lemmon	Mount Lemmon Survey	·	1.3 km	MPC · JPL
836671	2012 TM_{329}	—	September 16, 2012	Tincana	Zolnowski, M., Kusiak, M.	·	1.7 km	MPC · JPL
836672	2012 TW_{332}	—	October 9, 2012	Kitt Peak	Spacewatch	·	1.5 km	MPC · JPL
836673	2012 TD_{334}	—	January 27, 2010	WISE	WISE	DOR	2.0 km	MPC · JPL
836674	2012 TK_{335}	—	September 11, 2007	Kitt Peak	Spacewatch	·	1.4 km	MPC · JPL
836675	2012 TW_{338}	—	October 11, 2012	Piszkéstető	K. Sárneczky	·	810 m	MPC · JPL
836676	2012 TR_{341}	—	October 11, 2012	Kitt Peak	Spacewatch	·	1.4 km	MPC · JPL
836677	2012 TV_{341}	—	October 13, 2012	ESA OGS	ESA OGS	·	1.3 km	MPC · JPL
836678	2012 TO_{343}	—	May 19, 2014	Haleakala	Pan-STARRS 1	H	440 m	MPC · JPL
836679	2012 TJ_{345}	—	October 8, 2012	Haleakala	Pan-STARRS 1	·	2.1 km	MPC · JPL
836680	2012 TG_{346}	—	April 23, 2010	WISE	WISE	·	1.0 km	MPC · JPL
836681	2012 TS_{346}	—	November 11, 2001	Sacramento Peak	SDSS	LIX	2.4 km	MPC · JPL
836682	2012 TZ_{346}	—	October 15, 2012	Kitt Peak	Spacewatch	GAL	1.3 km	MPC · JPL
836683	2012 TN_{348}	—	October 14, 2012	Kitt Peak	Spacewatch	·	1.1 km	MPC · JPL
836684	2012 TV_{352}	—	October 9, 2012	Mount Lemmon	Mount Lemmon Survey	·	420 m	MPC · JPL
836685	2012 TH_{354}	—	October 15, 2012	Haleakala	Pan-STARRS 1	·	1.1 km	MPC · JPL
836686	2012 TO_{354}	—	October 15, 2012	Mount Lemmon	Mount Lemmon Survey	AGN	710 m	MPC · JPL
836687	2012 TV_{355}	—	October 5, 2012	Kitt Peak	Spacewatch	·	800 m	MPC · JPL
836688	2012 TL_{357}	—	October 8, 2012	Haleakala	Pan-STARRS 1	·	1.4 km	MPC · JPL
836689	2012 TL_{359}	—	October 9, 2012	Mount Lemmon	Mount Lemmon Survey	·	1.1 km	MPC · JPL
836690	2012 TN_{359}	—	October 5, 2012	Haleakala	Pan-STARRS 1	·	1.1 km	MPC · JPL
836691	2012 TW_{359}	—	October 9, 2012	Mount Lemmon	Mount Lemmon Survey	·	380 m	MPC · JPL
836692	2012 TG_{360}	—	October 6, 2012	Mount Lemmon	Mount Lemmon Survey	·	760 m	MPC · JPL
836693	2012 TY_{363}	—	October 8, 2012	Mount Lemmon	Mount Lemmon Survey	·	760 m	MPC · JPL
836694	2012 TG_{367}	—	October 7, 2012	Haleakala	Pan-STARRS 1	·	1.2 km	MPC · JPL
836695	2012 TW_{367}	—	October 8, 2012	Westfield	International Astronomical Search Collaboration	·	1.2 km	MPC · JPL
836696	2012 TT_{368}	—	October 11, 2012	Haleakala	Pan-STARRS 1	L5	5.8 km	MPC · JPL
836697	2012 TF_{372}	—	October 9, 2012	Haleakala	Pan-STARRS 1	·	1.2 km	MPC · JPL
836698	2012 TY_{372}	—	October 15, 2012	Haleakala	Pan-STARRS 1	HYG	2.1 km	MPC · JPL
836699	2012 TJ_{373}	—	September 19, 2007	Kitt Peak	Spacewatch	HOF	1.9 km	MPC · JPL
836700	2012 TN_{373}	—	October 10, 2012	Kitt Peak	Spacewatch	HNS	730 m	MPC · JPL

== 836701–836800 ==
back to top

Designation			Discovery			Properties		Ref
Permanent	Provisional	Named after	Date	Site	Discoverer(s)	Category	Diam.	Ref
836701	2012 TP_{373}	—	October 11, 2012	Haleakala	Pan-STARRS 1	·	2.1 km	MPC · JPL
836702	2012 TB_{374}	—	October 8, 2012	Mount Lemmon	Mount Lemmon Survey	·	1.2 km	MPC · JPL
836703	2012 TD_{375}	—	October 8, 2012	Haleakala	Pan-STARRS 1	·	1.1 km	MPC · JPL
836704	2012 TH_{375}	—	October 8, 2012	Haleakala	Pan-STARRS 1	·	1.4 km	MPC · JPL
836705	2012 TM_{375}	—	October 8, 2012	Kitt Peak	Spacewatch	AEO	670 m	MPC · JPL
836706	2012 TR_{375}	—	October 10, 2012	Mount Lemmon	Mount Lemmon Survey	GEF	800 m	MPC · JPL
836707	2012 TY_{375}	—	October 9, 2012	Mount Lemmon	Mount Lemmon Survey	·	820 m	MPC · JPL
836708	2012 TF_{377}	—	October 11, 2012	Kitt Peak	Spacewatch	·	1.2 km	MPC · JPL
836709	2012 TF_{378}	—	October 8, 2012	Haleakala	Pan-STARRS 1	·	1.3 km	MPC · JPL
836710	2012 TR_{378}	—	October 14, 2012	Mount Lemmon	Mount Lemmon Survey	GEF	870 m	MPC · JPL
836711	2012 TE_{380}	—	October 8, 2012	Haleakala	Pan-STARRS 1	·	1.2 km	MPC · JPL
836712	2012 TM_{380}	—	October 11, 2012	Haleakala	Pan-STARRS 1	AGN	850 m	MPC · JPL
836713	2012 TN_{380}	—	October 9, 2012	Haleakala	Pan-STARRS 1	·	1.1 km	MPC · JPL
836714	2012 TP_{380}	—	October 11, 2012	Haleakala	Pan-STARRS 1	HOF	1.7 km	MPC · JPL
836715	2012 TU_{380}	—	October 8, 2012	Haleakala	Pan-STARRS 1	·	1.1 km	MPC · JPL
836716	2012 TV_{380}	—	October 15, 2012	Haleakala	Pan-STARRS 1	·	1.4 km	MPC · JPL
836717	2012 TX_{380}	—	October 15, 2012	Mount Lemmon	Mount Lemmon Survey	·	1.1 km	MPC · JPL
836718	2012 TZ_{380}	—	October 6, 2012	Haleakala	Pan-STARRS 1	·	1.1 km	MPC · JPL
836719	2012 TB_{382}	—	October 11, 2012	Kitt Peak	Spacewatch	AGN	700 m	MPC · JPL
836720	2012 TK_{382}	—	October 9, 2012	Haleakala	Pan-STARRS 1	·	480 m	MPC · JPL
836721	2012 TO_{382}	—	October 14, 2012	Kitt Peak	Spacewatch	·	1.5 km	MPC · JPL
836722	2012 TH_{386}	—	October 9, 2012	Mount Lemmon	Mount Lemmon Survey	·	740 m	MPC · JPL
836723	2012 TK_{387}	—	October 7, 2012	Haleakala	Pan-STARRS 1	·	890 m	MPC · JPL
836724	2012 TN_{388}	—	September 28, 2006	Mount Lemmon	Mount Lemmon Survey	THB	2.0 km	MPC · JPL
836725	2012 TZ_{390}	—	October 11, 2012	Haleakala	Pan-STARRS 1	·	1.7 km	MPC · JPL
836726	2012 TM_{396}	—	October 8, 2012	Mount Lemmon	Mount Lemmon Survey	L5	5.9 km	MPC · JPL
836727	2012 TX_{396}	—	October 15, 2012	Haleakala	Pan-STARRS 1	L5	6.3 km	MPC · JPL
836728	2012 TV_{403}	—	October 11, 2012	Haleakala	Pan-STARRS 1	·	1.7 km	MPC · JPL
836729	2012 UE_{6}	—	October 7, 2012	Haleakala	Pan-STARRS 1	·	1.3 km	MPC · JPL
836730	2012 UM_{10}	—	October 8, 2012	Mount Lemmon	Mount Lemmon Survey	·	940 m	MPC · JPL
836731	2012 UZ_{20}	—	September 12, 2012	Kislovodsk	ISON-Kislovodsk Observatory	·	1.4 km	MPC · JPL
836732	2012 UQ_{23}	—	October 17, 2012	Mount Lemmon	Mount Lemmon Survey	·	2.3 km	MPC · JPL
836733	2012 UN_{24}	—	October 17, 2012	Mount Lemmon	Mount Lemmon Survey	·	1.4 km	MPC · JPL
836734	2012 UL_{25}	—	October 17, 2012	Mount Lemmon	Mount Lemmon Survey	·	1.2 km	MPC · JPL
836735	2012 UO_{25}	—	January 2, 2009	Kitt Peak	Spacewatch	·	1.4 km	MPC · JPL
836736	2012 UH_{26}	—	October 17, 2012	Mount Lemmon	Mount Lemmon Survey	·	1.2 km	MPC · JPL
836737	2012 UZ_{26}	—	September 28, 2003	Sacramento Peak	SDSS	·	1.4 km	MPC · JPL
836738	2012 UF_{27}	—	October 17, 2012	Piszkéstető	K. Sárneczky	·	1.5 km	MPC · JPL
836739	2012 UL_{30}	—	October 8, 2012	Kitt Peak	Spacewatch	·	450 m	MPC · JPL
836740	2012 UG_{34}	—	September 16, 2012	ESA OGS	ESA OGS	H	530 m	MPC · JPL
836741	2012 UV_{35}	—	August 28, 2012	Mount Lemmon	Mount Lemmon Survey	MAS	640 m	MPC · JPL
836742	2012 UU_{41}	—	October 17, 2012	Haleakala	Pan-STARRS 1	·	1.4 km	MPC · JPL
836743	2012 UO_{42}	—	September 16, 2012	Kitt Peak	Spacewatch	·	460 m	MPC · JPL
836744	2012 UL_{46}	—	November 7, 2008	Mount Lemmon	Mount Lemmon Survey	·	850 m	MPC · JPL
836745	2012 UN_{46}	—	October 18, 2012	Haleakala	Pan-STARRS 1	·	1.2 km	MPC · JPL
836746	2012 UW_{50}	—	October 20, 2003	Kitt Peak	Spacewatch	·	890 m	MPC · JPL
836747	2012 US_{52}	—	October 21, 2003	Kitt Peak	Spacewatch	·	1.1 km	MPC · JPL
836748	2012 UA_{55}	—	October 19, 2012	Haleakala	Pan-STARRS 1	·	1.2 km	MPC · JPL
836749	2012 UG_{56}	—	October 19, 2012	Haleakala	Pan-STARRS 1	·	1.2 km	MPC · JPL
836750	2012 UA_{57}	—	September 13, 2007	Mount Lemmon	Mount Lemmon Survey	·	1.4 km	MPC · JPL
836751	2012 UZ_{59}	—	October 19, 2012	Haleakala	Pan-STARRS 1	NYS	670 m	MPC · JPL
836752	2012 UK_{63}	—	January 23, 2010	WISE	WISE	·	1.1 km	MPC · JPL
836753	2012 UB_{64}	—	October 20, 2012	Mount Lemmon	Mount Lemmon Survey	·	1.1 km	MPC · JPL
836754	2012 UJ_{68}	—	October 21, 2012	Piszkés-tető	K. Sárneczky, G. Hodosán	H	450 m	MPC · JPL
836755	2012 UM_{68}	—	September 25, 2012	Mount Lemmon	Mount Lemmon Survey	AMO	500 m	MPC · JPL
836756	2012 UT_{69}	—	September 23, 2012	Kitt Peak	Spacewatch	EUN	890 m	MPC · JPL
836757	2012 UU_{69}	—	October 16, 2012	Kitt Peak	Spacewatch	·	900 m	MPC · JPL
836758	2012 UP_{75}	—	April 2, 2011	Mount Lemmon	Mount Lemmon Survey	·	2.2 km	MPC · JPL
836759	2012 UB_{76}	—	October 5, 2002	Sacramento Peak	SDSS	·	650 m	MPC · JPL
836760	2012 UY_{76}	—	October 18, 2012	Haleakala	Pan-STARRS 1	·	1.2 km	MPC · JPL
836761	2012 UH_{78}	—	October 19, 2012	Haleakala	Pan-STARRS 1	·	1.5 km	MPC · JPL
836762	2012 UN_{80}	—	October 14, 2012	Kitt Peak	Spacewatch	·	750 m	MPC · JPL
836763	2012 UR_{86}	—	August 22, 2003	Palomar	NEAT	·	1.2 km	MPC · JPL
836764	2012 US_{86}	—	March 20, 1999	Sacramento Peak	SDSS	·	1.2 km	MPC · JPL
836765	2012 UE_{89}	—	October 21, 2012	Haleakala	Pan-STARRS 1	·	750 m	MPC · JPL
836766	2012 US_{91}	—	October 16, 2012	Mount Lemmon	Mount Lemmon Survey	·	430 m	MPC · JPL
836767	2012 UE_{94}	—	September 15, 2007	Mount Lemmon	Mount Lemmon Survey	·	1.1 km	MPC · JPL
836768	2012 UM_{94}	—	October 17, 2012	Haleakala	Pan-STARRS 1	JUN	770 m	MPC · JPL
836769	2012 UT_{94}	—	September 25, 2012	Mount Lemmon	Mount Lemmon Survey	·	770 m	MPC · JPL
836770	2012 UG_{95}	—	September 25, 2012	Mount Lemmon	Mount Lemmon Survey	·	540 m	MPC · JPL
836771	2012 UK_{95}	—	October 8, 2012	Kitt Peak	Spacewatch	·	1.1 km	MPC · JPL
836772	2012 UL_{96}	—	October 17, 2012	Haleakala	Pan-STARRS 1	WIT	680 m	MPC · JPL
836773	2012 UK_{98}	—	October 6, 2012	Piszkés-tető	K. Sárneczky, M. Langbroek	·	1.2 km	MPC · JPL
836774	2012 UN_{100}	—	October 15, 2012	Kitt Peak	Spacewatch	NYS	820 m	MPC · JPL
836775	2012 UT_{101}	—	October 15, 2012	Kitt Peak	Spacewatch	·	580 m	MPC · JPL
836776	2012 UH_{103}	—	October 15, 2012	Kitt Peak	Spacewatch	MAS	470 m	MPC · JPL
836777	2012 US_{103}	—	October 18, 2012	Haleakala	Pan-STARRS 1	·	1.8 km	MPC · JPL
836778	2012 UE_{104}	—	October 18, 2012	Haleakala	Pan-STARRS 1	·	1.1 km	MPC · JPL
836779	2012 UP_{105}	—	October 29, 2005	Catalina	CSS	·	630 m	MPC · JPL
836780	2012 UT_{108}	—	April 3, 2011	Haleakala	Pan-STARRS 1	·	730 m	MPC · JPL
836781	2012 UL_{109}	—	August 28, 2012	Mount Lemmon	Mount Lemmon Survey	MIS	1.8 km	MPC · JPL
836782	2012 UU_{111}	—	April 10, 2005	Kitt Peak	Deep Ecliptic Survey	·	1.1 km	MPC · JPL
836783	2012 UB_{112}	—	October 9, 2012	Mount Lemmon	Mount Lemmon Survey	·	450 m	MPC · JPL
836784	2012 UO_{115}	—	September 25, 2012	Kitt Peak	Spacewatch	·	1.4 km	MPC · JPL
836785	2012 UT_{116}	—	October 22, 2012	Mount Lemmon	Mount Lemmon Survey	MRX	630 m	MPC · JPL
836786	2012 UY_{116}	—	October 22, 2012	Mount Lemmon	Mount Lemmon Survey	·	410 m	MPC · JPL
836787	2012 UY_{120}	—	October 14, 2001	Sacramento Peak	SDSS	·	1.7 km	MPC · JPL
836788	2012 UQ_{122}	—	November 21, 2008	Kitt Peak	Spacewatch	MAR	710 m	MPC · JPL
836789	2012 UX_{122}	—	November 15, 1995	Kitt Peak	Spacewatch	·	2.3 km	MPC · JPL
836790	2012 UZ_{124}	—	October 22, 2012	Haleakala	Pan-STARRS 1	·	1.5 km	MPC · JPL
836791	2012 UH_{128}	—	April 10, 2005	Mount Lemmon	Mount Lemmon Survey	·	1.2 km	MPC · JPL
836792	2012 UC_{129}	—	September 19, 2003	Palomar	NEAT	·	1.2 km	MPC · JPL
836793	2012 UP_{129}	—	October 18, 2012	Mount Lemmon	Mount Lemmon Survey	·	530 m	MPC · JPL
836794	2012 UT_{130}	—	September 23, 2012	Mount Lemmon	Mount Lemmon Survey	·	1.2 km	MPC · JPL
836795	2012 UK_{131}	—	October 6, 2012	Catalina	CSS	·	1.1 km	MPC · JPL
836796	2012 UK_{134}	—	October 27, 2008	Mount Lemmon	Mount Lemmon Survey	·	1.5 km	MPC · JPL
836797	2012 UJ_{136}	—	October 15, 2012	Siding Spring	SSS	·	960 m	MPC · JPL
836798	2012 UH_{138}	—	October 10, 2012	Kitt Peak	Spacewatch	T_{j} (2.98)	2.8 km	MPC · JPL
836799	2012 UO_{143}	—	November 1, 2008	Mount Lemmon	Mount Lemmon Survey	(5)	820 m	MPC · JPL
836800	2012 UB_{147}	—	October 19, 2012	Haleakala	Pan-STARRS 1	·	490 m	MPC · JPL

== 836801–836900 ==
back to top

Designation			Discovery			Properties		Ref
Permanent	Provisional	Named after	Date	Site	Discoverer(s)	Category	Diam.	Ref
836801	2012 UV_{151}	—	October 21, 2012	Kitt Peak	Spacewatch	·	490 m	MPC · JPL
836802	2012 UM_{155}	—	October 22, 2012	Haleakala	Pan-STARRS 1	·	1.5 km	MPC · JPL
836803	2012 UV_{156}	—	October 10, 2012	Mount Lemmon	Mount Lemmon Survey	·	2.2 km	MPC · JPL
836804	2012 UV_{174}	—	October 17, 2012	Haleakala	Pan-STARRS 1	NYS	1.0 km	MPC · JPL
836805	2012 UB_{179}	—	October 14, 2001	Sacramento Peak	SDSS	EOS	1.7 km	MPC · JPL
836806	2012 UO_{179}	—	January 1, 2009	Mount Lemmon	Mount Lemmon Survey	·	1.2 km	MPC · JPL
836807	2012 UJ_{180}	—	October 17, 2012	Mount Lemmon	Mount Lemmon Survey	V	520 m	MPC · JPL
836808	2012 UO_{180}	—	October 21, 2003	Kitt Peak	Spacewatch	·	1.1 km	MPC · JPL
836809	2012 UF_{182}	—	October 19, 2012	Haleakala	Pan-STARRS 1	·	2.6 km	MPC · JPL
836810	2012 UR_{183}	—	April 15, 2010	Mount Lemmon	Mount Lemmon Survey	·	1.6 km	MPC · JPL
836811	2012 UN_{184}	—	October 17, 2012	Haleakala	Pan-STARRS 1	·	1.5 km	MPC · JPL
836812	2012 UP_{184}	—	March 20, 1999	Sacramento Peak	SDSS	·	1.7 km	MPC · JPL
836813	2012 UX_{186}	—	October 20, 2012	Haleakala	Pan-STARRS 1	·	1.4 km	MPC · JPL
836814	2012 UE_{187}	—	August 7, 2016	Haleakala	Pan-STARRS 1	·	1.3 km	MPC · JPL
836815	2012 UZ_{188}	—	April 27, 2016	Mount Lemmon	Mount Lemmon Survey	·	1.9 km	MPC · JPL
836816	2012 UP_{190}	—	October 22, 2012	Mount Lemmon	Mount Lemmon Survey	·	490 m	MPC · JPL
836817	2012 UW_{190}	—	June 27, 2005	Mount Lemmon	Mount Lemmon Survey	·	2.5 km	MPC · JPL
836818	2012 UM_{191}	—	February 26, 2014	Haleakala	Pan-STARRS 1	·	1.1 km	MPC · JPL
836819	2012 UO_{191}	—	October 18, 2012	Haleakala	Pan-STARRS 1	·	700 m	MPC · JPL
836820	2012 UN_{192}	—	October 18, 2012	Haleakala	Pan-STARRS 1	·	750 m	MPC · JPL
836821	2012 UM_{193}	—	October 26, 2012	Mount Lemmon	Mount Lemmon Survey	·	500 m	MPC · JPL
836822	2012 UC_{196}	—	October 25, 2012	Mount Lemmon	Mount Lemmon Survey	·	1.2 km	MPC · JPL
836823	2012 UU_{196}	—	October 18, 2012	Haleakala	Pan-STARRS 1	·	1.1 km	MPC · JPL
836824	2012 UV_{196}	—	October 18, 2012	Haleakala	Pan-STARRS 1	MAS	570 m	MPC · JPL
836825	2012 UM_{198}	—	October 17, 2012	Mount Lemmon	Mount Lemmon Survey	·	1.3 km	MPC · JPL
836826	2012 UE_{199}	—	October 17, 2012	Mount Lemmon	Mount Lemmon Survey	EUP	2.3 km	MPC · JPL
836827	2012 UR_{200}	—	March 18, 2018	Haleakala	Pan-STARRS 1	·	760 m	MPC · JPL
836828	2012 UT_{203}	—	December 19, 2017	Mount Lemmon	Mount Lemmon Survey	H	550 m	MPC · JPL
836829	2012 UY_{203}	—	January 20, 2010	WISE	WISE	·	1.4 km	MPC · JPL
836830	2012 UH_{205}	—	October 19, 2012	Haleakala	Pan-STARRS 1	·	1.4 km	MPC · JPL
836831	2012 UM_{207}	—	July 1, 2010	WISE	WISE	·	1.5 km	MPC · JPL
836832	2012 UO_{211}	—	October 17, 2012	Haleakala	Pan-STARRS 1	·	1.2 km	MPC · JPL
836833	2012 UC_{212}	—	October 18, 2012	Haleakala	Pan-STARRS 1	·	930 m	MPC · JPL
836834	2012 UE_{213}	—	October 21, 2012	Kitt Peak	Spacewatch	AGN	760 m	MPC · JPL
836835	2012 UE_{215}	—	October 21, 2012	Kitt Peak	Spacewatch	·	1.0 km	MPC · JPL
836836	2012 UO_{218}	—	October 16, 2012	Mount Lemmon	Mount Lemmon Survey	(17392)	1.1 km	MPC · JPL
836837	2012 UA_{220}	—	October 23, 2012	Kitt Peak	Spacewatch	·	1.4 km	MPC · JPL
836838	2012 UM_{220}	—	October 21, 2012	Haleakala	Pan-STARRS 1	·	2.3 km	MPC · JPL
836839	2012 UU_{221}	—	October 22, 2012	Haleakala	Pan-STARRS 1	·	940 m	MPC · JPL
836840	2012 UC_{222}	—	October 18, 2012	Haleakala	Pan-STARRS 1	·	1.3 km	MPC · JPL
836841	2012 UH_{223}	—	October 20, 2012	Kitt Peak	Spacewatch	·	1.4 km	MPC · JPL
836842	2012 UJ_{227}	—	October 21, 2012	Haleakala	Pan-STARRS 1	·	910 m	MPC · JPL
836843	2012 UY_{228}	—	October 18, 2012	Haleakala	Pan-STARRS 1	·	2.2 km	MPC · JPL
836844	2012 UT_{229}	—	October 22, 2012	Kitt Peak	Spacewatch	V	490 m	MPC · JPL
836845	2012 UV_{231}	—	October 23, 2012	Mount Lemmon	Mount Lemmon Survey	EOS	1.5 km	MPC · JPL
836846	2012 UR_{232}	—	October 19, 2012	Mount Lemmon	Mount Lemmon Survey	MRX	860 m	MPC · JPL
836847	2012 UP_{234}	—	October 21, 2012	Haleakala	Pan-STARRS 1	·	910 m	MPC · JPL
836848	2012 UV_{234}	—	October 17, 2012	Haleakala	Pan-STARRS 1	WIT	720 m	MPC · JPL
836849	2012 UL_{235}	—	October 17, 2012	Mount Lemmon	Mount Lemmon Survey	·	1.5 km	MPC · JPL
836850	2012 UB_{239}	—	October 21, 2012	Haleakala	Pan-STARRS 1	·	560 m	MPC · JPL
836851	2012 UC_{239}	—	October 17, 2012	Mount Lemmon	Mount Lemmon Survey	VER	1.9 km	MPC · JPL
836852	2012 UO_{239}	—	October 18, 2012	Haleakala	Pan-STARRS 1	·	1.2 km	MPC · JPL
836853	2012 UP_{239}	—	October 18, 2012	Haleakala	Pan-STARRS 1	NEM	1.5 km	MPC · JPL
836854	2012 UT_{239}	—	October 18, 2012	Haleakala	Pan-STARRS 1	·	1.3 km	MPC · JPL
836855	2012 UP_{240}	—	October 17, 2012	Haleakala	Pan-STARRS 1	·	1.3 km	MPC · JPL
836856	2012 UQ_{240}	—	October 18, 2012	Haleakala	Pan-STARRS 1	·	1.2 km	MPC · JPL
836857	2012 UA_{241}	—	October 17, 2012	Haleakala	Pan-STARRS 1	·	1.1 km	MPC · JPL
836858	2012 UU_{241}	—	October 18, 2012	Haleakala	Pan-STARRS 1	·	1.1 km	MPC · JPL
836859	2012 UC_{242}	—	October 17, 2012	Haleakala	Pan-STARRS 1	WIT	620 m	MPC · JPL
836860	2012 UJ_{242}	—	October 18, 2012	Haleakala	Pan-STARRS 1	NEM	1.3 km	MPC · JPL
836861	2012 UO_{242}	—	October 18, 2012	Haleakala	Pan-STARRS 1	HOF	1.9 km	MPC · JPL
836862	2012 UU_{242}	—	September 5, 2007	Catalina	CSS	·	1.7 km	MPC · JPL
836863	2012 UV_{242}	—	October 18, 2012	Haleakala	Pan-STARRS 1	·	1.1 km	MPC · JPL
836864	2012 UA_{243}	—	October 20, 2012	Haleakala	Pan-STARRS 1	·	1.3 km	MPC · JPL
836865	2012 UB_{244}	—	October 22, 2012	Haleakala	Pan-STARRS 1	EOS	1.3 km	MPC · JPL
836866	2012 UC_{245}	—	October 18, 2012	Mount Lemmon	Mount Lemmon Survey	·	1.1 km	MPC · JPL
836867	2012 US_{245}	—	October 18, 2012	Haleakala	Pan-STARRS 1	·	1.0 km	MPC · JPL
836868	2012 UO_{246}	—	October 16, 2012	Mount Lemmon	Mount Lemmon Survey	NYS	800 m	MPC · JPL
836869	2012 UM_{247}	—	October 16, 2012	Mount Lemmon	Mount Lemmon Survey	·	1.1 km	MPC · JPL
836870	2012 UT_{249}	—	October 18, 2012	Haleakala	Pan-STARRS 1	·	1.1 km	MPC · JPL
836871	2012 UX_{251}	—	October 17, 2012	Haleakala	Pan-STARRS 1	·	400 m	MPC · JPL
836872	2012 UL_{252}	—	October 18, 2012	Haleakala	Pan-STARRS 1	·	350 m	MPC · JPL
836873	2012 UF_{255}	—	October 18, 2012	Haleakala	Pan-STARRS 1	·	1.1 km	MPC · JPL
836874	2012 UK_{256}	—	October 17, 2012	Mount Lemmon	Mount Lemmon Survey	VER	1.9 km	MPC · JPL
836875	2012 UF_{258}	—	October 19, 2012	Haleakala	Pan-STARRS 1	·	2.7 km	MPC · JPL
836876	2012 UT_{260}	—	October 17, 2012	Mount Lemmon	Mount Lemmon Survey	·	1.6 km	MPC · JPL
836877	2012 VY	—	October 25, 2008	Kitt Peak	Spacewatch	·	1.1 km	MPC · JPL
836878	2012 VB_{1}	—	October 20, 2003	Socorro	LINEAR	·	1.8 km	MPC · JPL
836879	2012 VQ_{3}	—	October 8, 2012	Kitt Peak	Spacewatch	·	1.2 km	MPC · JPL
836880	2012 VQ_{4}	—	November 5, 2012	Westfield	International Astronomical Search Collaboration	·	1.5 km	MPC · JPL
836881	2012 VS_{7}	—	October 9, 2004	Kitt Peak	Spacewatch	3:2 · SHU	3.8 km	MPC · JPL
836882	2012 VG_{8}	—	October 17, 2012	Haleakala	Pan-STARRS 1	·	690 m	MPC · JPL
836883	2012 VC_{11}	—	October 6, 2012	Mount Lemmon	Mount Lemmon Survey	AEO	690 m	MPC · JPL
836884	2012 VN_{11}	—	April 27, 2000	Anderson Mesa	LONEOS	PHO	740 m	MPC · JPL
836885	2012 VV_{11}	—	September 19, 1998	Sacramento Peak	SDSS	·	1.3 km	MPC · JPL
836886	2012 VJ_{12}	—	October 18, 2012	Haleakala	Pan-STARRS 1	·	1.1 km	MPC · JPL
836887	2012 VZ_{12}	—	October 23, 2003	Kitt Peak	Spacewatch	·	1.3 km	MPC · JPL
836888	2012 VR_{14}	—	October 8, 2012	Kitt Peak	Spacewatch	·	920 m	MPC · JPL
836889	2012 VV_{19}	—	November 11, 2001	Sacramento Peak	SDSS	·	2.3 km	MPC · JPL
836890	2012 VW_{21}	—	September 30, 2003	Socorro	LINEAR	·	1.4 km	MPC · JPL
836891	2012 VP_{23}	—	November 4, 2012	Mount Lemmon	Mount Lemmon Survey	·	1.3 km	MPC · JPL
836892	2012 VX_{24}	—	October 21, 2012	Kitt Peak	Spacewatch	·	1.3 km	MPC · JPL
836893	2012 VZ_{33}	—	November 4, 2012	Catalina	CSS	·	1.4 km	MPC · JPL
836894	2012 VS_{34}	—	October 19, 2012	Haleakala	Pan-STARRS 1	·	1.1 km	MPC · JPL
836895	2012 VF_{43}	—	November 6, 2012	Mount Lemmon	Mount Lemmon Survey	·	450 m	MPC · JPL
836896	2012 VW_{52}	—	October 8, 2012	Mount Lemmon	Mount Lemmon Survey	·	1.3 km	MPC · JPL
836897	2012 VE_{54}	—	November 6, 2012	Mount Lemmon	Mount Lemmon Survey	·	1.3 km	MPC · JPL
836898	2012 VD_{59}	—	October 21, 2012	Haleakala	Pan-STARRS 1	·	1.3 km	MPC · JPL
836899	2012 VV_{59}	—	November 7, 2012	Haleakala	Pan-STARRS 1	NYS	770 m	MPC · JPL
836900	2012 VL_{61}	—	October 14, 2001	Sacramento Peak	SDSS	·	2.3 km	MPC · JPL

== 836901–837000 ==
back to top

Designation			Discovery			Properties		Ref
Permanent	Provisional	Named after	Date	Site	Discoverer(s)	Category	Diam.	Ref
836901	2012 VA_{66}	—	October 15, 2012	Kitt Peak	Spacewatch	·	670 m	MPC · JPL
836902	2012 VC_{66}	—	October 16, 2012	Kitt Peak	Spacewatch	·	980 m	MPC · JPL
836903	2012 VS_{66}	—	October 11, 2012	Haleakala	Pan-STARRS 1	·	1.4 km	MPC · JPL
836904	2012 VE_{71}	—	November 19, 2003	Kitt Peak	Spacewatch	·	890 m	MPC · JPL
836905	2012 VS_{72}	—	October 9, 2012	Mount Lemmon	Mount Lemmon Survey	·	530 m	MPC · JPL
836906	2012 VO_{74}	—	September 15, 1998	Kitt Peak	Spacewatch	·	1.2 km	MPC · JPL
836907	2012 VG_{78}	—	November 12, 2012	Haleakala	Pan-STARRS 1	VER	2.0 km	MPC · JPL
836908	2012 VH_{79}	—	October 10, 2002	Sacramento Peak	SDSS	·	690 m	MPC · JPL
836909	2012 VS_{80}	—	November 12, 2012	Haleakala	Pan-STARRS 1	URS	2.4 km	MPC · JPL
836910	2012 VO_{92}	—	September 23, 2011	Mount Lemmon	Mount Lemmon Survey	3:2 · SHU	4.3 km	MPC · JPL
836911	2012 VQ_{95}	—	October 16, 2012	Kitt Peak	Spacewatch	·	1.9 km	MPC · JPL
836912	2012 VB_{96}	—	October 17, 2012	Mount Lemmon	Mount Lemmon Survey	·	1.3 km	MPC · JPL
836913	2012 VE_{96}	—	November 14, 2012	Mauna Kea	M. Micheli, Draginda, A.	V	410 m	MPC · JPL
836914	2012 VM_{103}	—	October 21, 2012	Haleakala	Pan-STARRS 1	·	520 m	MPC · JPL
836915	2012 VM_{104}	—	October 21, 2012	Haleakala	Pan-STARRS 1	·	1.1 km	MPC · JPL
836916	2012 VR_{109}	—	November 19, 2003	Kitt Peak	Spacewatch	DOR	1.3 km	MPC · JPL
836917	2012 VL_{113}	—	November 6, 2012	Mount Lemmon	Mount Lemmon Survey	·	1.3 km	MPC · JPL
836918	2012 VR_{117}	—	November 7, 2012	Kitt Peak	Spacewatch	·	450 m	MPC · JPL
836919	2012 VF_{118}	—	April 8, 2014	Haleakala	Pan-STARRS 1	·	1.3 km	MPC · JPL
836920	2012 VJ_{119}	—	November 12, 2012	Mount Lemmon	Mount Lemmon Survey	MAR	730 m	MPC · JPL
836921	2012 VT_{119}	—	November 12, 2012	Mount Lemmon	Mount Lemmon Survey	·	1.1 km	MPC · JPL
836922	2012 VC_{120}	—	January 22, 2015	Haleakala	Pan-STARRS 1	·	1.5 km	MPC · JPL
836923	2012 VG_{121}	—	November 14, 2012	Mount Lemmon	Mount Lemmon Survey	·	1.3 km	MPC · JPL
836924	2012 VW_{124}	—	November 4, 2012	Mount Lemmon	Mount Lemmon Survey	NYS	930 m	MPC · JPL
836925	2012 VQ_{125}	—	November 7, 2012	Mount Lemmon	Mount Lemmon Survey	DOR	1.7 km	MPC · JPL
836926	2012 VZ_{125}	—	April 19, 2015	Cerro Tololo	DECam	·	2.1 km	MPC · JPL
836927	2012 VR_{128}	—	November 3, 2012	Haleakala	Pan-STARRS 1	cubewano (hot)	558 km	MPC · JPL
836928	2012 VD_{130}	—	November 13, 2012	ESA OGS	ESA OGS	H	260 m	MPC · JPL
836929	2012 VX_{130}	—	November 7, 2012	Kitt Peak	Spacewatch	(5)	960 m	MPC · JPL
836930	2012 VR_{134}	—	August 25, 2005	Palomar	NEAT	·	500 m	MPC · JPL
836931	2012 VT_{137}	—	November 11, 2012	Nogales	M. Schwartz, P. R. Holvorcem	·	1.1 km	MPC · JPL
836932	2012 VB_{138}	—	November 3, 2012	Mount Lemmon	Mount Lemmon Survey	AGN	760 m	MPC · JPL
836933	2012 VL_{138}	—	November 4, 2012	Mount Lemmon	Mount Lemmon Survey	·	1.4 km	MPC · JPL
836934	2012 VY_{138}	—	November 12, 2012	Mount Lemmon	Mount Lemmon Survey	·	2.4 km	MPC · JPL
836935	2012 VK_{139}	—	November 12, 2012	Mount Lemmon	Mount Lemmon Survey	AEO	930 m	MPC · JPL
836936	2012 VG_{140}	—	November 6, 2012	Kitt Peak	Spacewatch	EUN	880 m	MPC · JPL
836937	2012 VU_{144}	—	November 15, 2012	Mount Lemmon	Mount Lemmon Survey	·	1.0 km	MPC · JPL
836938	2012 WX_{3}	—	October 31, 2005	Catalina	CSS	PHO	800 m	MPC · JPL
836939	2012 WC_{5}	—	October 22, 2012	Haleakala	Pan-STARRS 1	·	1.9 km	MPC · JPL
836940	2012 WY_{8}	—	October 21, 2012	Haleakala	Pan-STARRS 1	DOR	1.6 km	MPC · JPL
836941	2012 WL_{16}	—	September 14, 2007	Mount Lemmon	Mount Lemmon Survey	AGN	720 m	MPC · JPL
836942	2012 WK_{17}	—	November 19, 2012	Kitt Peak	Spacewatch	MAS	550 m	MPC · JPL
836943	2012 WU_{17}	—	October 22, 2012	Haleakala	Pan-STARRS 1	·	800 m	MPC · JPL
836944	2012 WQ_{21}	—	November 20, 2012	Mount Lemmon	Mount Lemmon Survey	·	1.4 km	MPC · JPL
836945	2012 WR_{22}	—	November 20, 2012	Mount Lemmon	Mount Lemmon Survey	·	1.2 km	MPC · JPL
836946	2012 WB_{24}	—	November 14, 1999	Socorro	LINEAR	·	1.3 km	MPC · JPL
836947	2012 WB_{27}	—	September 13, 1980	Palomar Mountain	S. J. Bus	·	1.7 km	MPC · JPL
836948	2012 WR_{27}	—	November 12, 2012	Catalina	CSS	·	1.8 km	MPC · JPL
836949	2012 WJ_{30}	—	October 13, 2012	Kitt Peak	Spacewatch	(5)	810 m	MPC · JPL
836950	2012 WO_{30}	—	August 21, 2006	Kitt Peak	Spacewatch	·	1.7 km	MPC · JPL
836951	2012 WZ_{32}	—	November 26, 2012	Mount Lemmon	Mount Lemmon Survey	·	560 m	MPC · JPL
836952	2012 WQ_{37}	—	April 16, 2010	WISE	WISE	·	1.2 km	MPC · JPL
836953	2012 WS_{42}	—	November 20, 2012	Mount Lemmon	Mount Lemmon Survey	·	470 m	MPC · JPL
836954	2012 WW_{42}	—	November 20, 2012	Mount Lemmon	Mount Lemmon Survey	EOS	1.4 km	MPC · JPL
836955 Lais	2012 WZ_{43}	Lais	November 24, 2012	Mount Graham	K. Černis, R. P. Boyle	KOR	1.0 km	MPC · JPL
836956	2012 WD_{44}	—	November 23, 2012	Kitt Peak	Spacewatch	HOF	1.8 km	MPC · JPL
836957	2012 WK_{47}	—	November 23, 2012	Kitt Peak	Spacewatch	·	830 m	MPC · JPL
836958	2012 XF	—	November 7, 2012	Haleakala	Pan-STARRS 1	H	410 m	MPC · JPL
836959	2012 XS_{1}	—	February 13, 2002	Sacramento Peak	SDSS	NYS	1.0 km	MPC · JPL
836960	2012 XG_{4}	—	December 3, 2012	Mount Lemmon	Mount Lemmon Survey	·	1.4 km	MPC · JPL
836961	2012 XQ_{8}	—	April 8, 2010	WISE	WISE	·	3.7 km	MPC · JPL
836962	2012 XA_{9}	—	December 2, 2012	Mount Lemmon	Mount Lemmon Survey	·	470 m	MPC · JPL
836963	2012 XP_{9}	—	October 14, 2012	Kitt Peak	Spacewatch	·	1.3 km	MPC · JPL
836964	2012 XH_{10}	—	May 25, 2006	Mauna Kea	P. A. Wiegert	·	2.1 km	MPC · JPL
836965	2012 XT_{13}	—	December 5, 2012	Mount Lemmon	Mount Lemmon Survey	EOS	1.5 km	MPC · JPL
836966	2012 XU_{13}	—	November 14, 2012	Mount Lemmon	Mount Lemmon Survey	·	1 km	MPC · JPL
836967	2012 XX_{18}	—	November 24, 2012	Kitt Peak	Spacewatch	·	1.2 km	MPC · JPL
836968	2012 XH_{23}	—	November 13, 2012	Mount Lemmon	Mount Lemmon Survey	·	1.2 km	MPC · JPL
836969	2012 XO_{27}	—	October 17, 2012	Mount Lemmon	Mount Lemmon Survey	·	1.4 km	MPC · JPL
836970	2012 XW_{28}	—	November 7, 2012	Kitt Peak	Spacewatch	·	490 m	MPC · JPL
836971	2012 XA_{29}	—	December 3, 2012	Mount Lemmon	Mount Lemmon Survey	·	540 m	MPC · JPL
836972	2012 XH_{31}	—	June 23, 2010	WISE	WISE	·	1.3 km	MPC · JPL
836973	2012 XN_{33}	—	December 3, 2012	Mount Lemmon	Mount Lemmon Survey	·	800 m	MPC · JPL
836974	2012 XN_{35}	—	December 3, 2012	Mount Lemmon	Mount Lemmon Survey	·	490 m	MPC · JPL
836975	2012 XT_{38}	—	December 3, 2012	Mount Lemmon	Mount Lemmon Survey	·	1.6 km	MPC · JPL
836976	2012 XP_{40}	—	December 3, 2012	Mount Lemmon	Mount Lemmon Survey	·	990 m	MPC · JPL
836977	2012 XH_{48}	—	December 5, 2012	Mount Lemmon	Mount Lemmon Survey	·	1.0 km	MPC · JPL
836978	2012 XS_{53}	—	December 7, 2012	Mount Lemmon	Mount Lemmon Survey	MRX	800 m	MPC · JPL
836979	2012 XE_{58}	—	December 3, 2012	Mount Lemmon	Mount Lemmon Survey	·	470 m	MPC · JPL
836980	2012 XB_{60}	—	October 21, 2012	Haleakala	Pan-STARRS 1	·	1.1 km	MPC · JPL
836981	2012 XC_{64}	—	December 4, 2012	Mount Lemmon	Mount Lemmon Survey	·	1.0 km	MPC · JPL
836982	2012 XQ_{64}	—	December 4, 2012	Mount Lemmon	Mount Lemmon Survey	·	1.2 km	MPC · JPL
836983	2012 XQ_{67}	—	August 23, 2007	Kitt Peak	Spacewatch	·	1.4 km	MPC · JPL
836984	2012 XY_{67}	—	October 10, 2002	Sacramento Peak	SDSS	AGN	1.0 km	MPC · JPL
836985	2012 XY_{68}	—	November 19, 2012	Kitt Peak	Spacewatch	·	660 m	MPC · JPL
836986	2012 XQ_{73}	—	November 14, 2012	Kitt Peak	Spacewatch	·	1.5 km	MPC · JPL
836987	2012 XP_{75}	—	December 6, 2012	Mount Lemmon	Mount Lemmon Survey	HOF	1.6 km	MPC · JPL
836988	2012 XQ_{79}	—	August 10, 2007	Kitt Peak	Spacewatch	·	1.2 km	MPC · JPL
836989	2012 XW_{85}	—	September 12, 2007	Kitt Peak	Spacewatch	·	1.4 km	MPC · JPL
836990	2012 XZ_{85}	—	December 7, 2012	Kitt Peak	Spacewatch	(5)	900 m	MPC · JPL
836991	2012 XH_{88}	—	September 30, 2003	Kitt Peak	Spacewatch	·	1.1 km	MPC · JPL
836992	2012 XO_{90}	—	October 28, 2008	Kitt Peak	Spacewatch	·	1.0 km	MPC · JPL
836993	2012 XZ_{92}	—	December 8, 2012	Socorro	LINEAR	BAR	1.3 km	MPC · JPL
836994	2012 XM_{94}	—	November 26, 2012	Mount Lemmon	Mount Lemmon Survey	·	3.2 km	MPC · JPL
836995	2012 XD_{100}	—	December 5, 2012	Mount Lemmon	Mount Lemmon Survey	·	2.0 km	MPC · JPL
836996	2012 XF_{103}	—	December 6, 2012	Catalina	CSS	PHO	880 m	MPC · JPL
836997	2012 XD_{106}	—	August 5, 2010	WISE	WISE	·	3.0 km	MPC · JPL
836998	2012 XS_{109}	—	December 8, 2012	Mount Lemmon	Mount Lemmon Survey	·	2.1 km	MPC · JPL
836999	2012 XK_{113}	—	June 6, 2011	Mount Lemmon	Mount Lemmon Survey	H	390 m	MPC · JPL
837000	2012 XO_{126}	—	April 7, 2003	Palomar	NEAT	H	570 m	MPC · JPL

back to top

== Meaning of names ==
As minor planet discoveries are confirmed, they are given a permanent number by the IAU's Minor Planet Center (MPC), and the discoverers can then submit names for them, following the IAU's naming conventions. The list below concerns those minor planets in the specified number-range that have received names, and explains the meanings of those names.

Official naming citations of newly named small Solar System bodies are approved and published in a bulletin by IAU's Working Group for Small Bodies Nomenclature (WGSBN). Before May 2021, citations were published in MPC's Minor Planet Circulars for many decades. Recent citations can also be found on the JPL Small-Body Database (SBDB). Until his death in 2016, German astronomer Lutz D. Schmadel compiled these citations into the Dictionary of Minor Planet Names (DMP) and regularly updated the collection.

Based on Paul Herget's The Names of the Minor Planets, Schmadel also researched the unclear origin of numerous asteroids, most of which had been named prior to World War II. This article incorporates text from this source, which is in the public domain: SBDB New namings may only be added to this list below after official publication as the preannouncement of names is condemned. The WGSBN publishes a comprehensive guideline for the naming rules of non-cometary small Solar System bodies.

Named minor planet	Provisional	This minor planet was named for...	Ref · Catalog
836112 Danieloconnell	2012 DK_{85}	Daniel Joseph O'Connell, S.J., British Jesuit astronomer.	IAU · 836112
836275 Pietromaffi	2012 HS_{104}	Pietro Cardinal Maffi (1858–1931), Archbishop of Pisa, served as President of the Vatican Observatory from 1904 till his death in 1931.	IAU · 836275
836465 Kulmatycki	2012 RY_{11}	Wojciech Kulmatycki, Polish master-class shooting coach and popularizer of sport shooting.	IAU · 836465
836955 Lais	2012 WZ_{43}	Giuseppe Lais, an Oratorian priest and Italian astronomer who was key in establishing the Vatican Observatory.	IAU · 836955
