= List of minor planets: 712001–713000 =

The following is a partial list of minor planets, running from minor-planet number 712001 through 713000, inclusive. The primary data for this and other partial lists is based on JPL's "Small-Body Orbital Elements" and data available from the Minor Planet Center. Critical list information is also provided by the MPC, unless otherwise specified from Lowell Observatory. A detailed description of the table's columns and additional sources are given on the main page including a complete list of every page in this series, and a statistical break-up on the dynamical classification of minor planets.

Also see the summary list of all named bodies in numerical and alphabetical order, and the corresponding naming citations for the number range of this particular list. New namings may only be added to this list after official publication, as the preannouncement of names is condemned by the Working Group for Small Bodies Nomenclature of the International Astronomical Union.

Near-Earth obj.	MBA (inner)	MBA (outer)	Centaur
Mars-crosser	MBA (middle)	Jupiter trojan	Trans-Neptunian obj.
Unclassified

== 712001–712100 ==
Designation			Discovery			Properties		Ref
Permanent	Provisional	Named after	Date	Site	Discoverer(s)	Category	Diam.	Ref
712001	2014 QS_{511}	—	August 23, 2014	Haleakala	Pan-STARRS 1	·	1.9 km	MPC · JPL
712002	2014 QW_{516}	—	August 28, 2014	Haleakala	Pan-STARRS 1	EOS	1.4 km	MPC · JPL
712003	2014 QS_{518}	—	August 20, 2014	Haleakala	Pan-STARRS 1	KON	2.2 km	MPC · JPL
712004	2014 QX_{521}	—	August 20, 2014	Haleakala	Pan-STARRS 1	HOF	1.8 km	MPC · JPL
712005	2014 QY_{521}	—	August 28, 2014	Haleakala	Pan-STARRS 1	VER	2.1 km	MPC · JPL
712006	2014 QZ_{521}	—	August 31, 2014	Haleakala	Pan-STARRS 1	·	1.5 km	MPC · JPL
712007	2014 QA_{522}	—	August 23, 2014	Haleakala	Pan-STARRS 1	·	2.3 km	MPC · JPL
712008	2014 QN_{522}	—	August 31, 2014	Haleakala	Pan-STARRS 1	·	960 m	MPC · JPL
712009	2014 QT_{523}	—	August 31, 2014	Haleakala	Pan-STARRS 1	·	1.6 km	MPC · JPL
712010	2014 QU_{523}	—	August 27, 2014	Haleakala	Pan-STARRS 1	·	670 m	MPC · JPL
712011	2014 QZ_{524}	—	August 27, 2014	Haleakala	Pan-STARRS 1	EOS	1.3 km	MPC · JPL
712012	2014 QO_{528}	—	August 30, 2014	Mount Lemmon	Mount Lemmon Survey	EOS	1.3 km	MPC · JPL
712013	2014 QV_{528}	—	August 25, 2014	Haleakala	Pan-STARRS 1	·	2.0 km	MPC · JPL
712014	2014 QD_{529}	—	August 16, 2014	Haleakala	Pan-STARRS 1	·	560 m	MPC · JPL
712015	2014 QE_{529}	—	August 20, 2014	Haleakala	Pan-STARRS 1	·	630 m	MPC · JPL
712016	2014 QB_{531}	—	August 21, 2014	Haleakala	Pan-STARRS 1	·	2.6 km	MPC · JPL
712017	2014 QB_{532}	—	August 18, 2014	Haleakala	Pan-STARRS 1	·	3.0 km	MPC · JPL
712018	2014 QH_{535}	—	August 21, 2014	Haleakala	Pan-STARRS 1	EOS	1.3 km	MPC · JPL
712019	2014 QG_{537}	—	August 31, 2014	Haleakala	Pan-STARRS 1	·	2.1 km	MPC · JPL
712020	2014 QA_{538}	—	August 22, 2014	Haleakala	Pan-STARRS 1	·	1.7 km	MPC · JPL
712021	2014 QF_{538}	—	August 21, 2014	Haleakala	Pan-STARRS 1	·	1.3 km	MPC · JPL
712022	2014 QV_{538}	—	August 28, 2014	Haleakala	Pan-STARRS 1	·	1.4 km	MPC · JPL
712023	2014 QX_{539}	—	August 31, 2014	Haleakala	Pan-STARRS 1	·	1.8 km	MPC · JPL
712024	2014 QQ_{540}	—	August 23, 2014	Haleakala	Pan-STARRS 1	EOS	1.2 km	MPC · JPL
712025	2014 QU_{540}	—	August 20, 2014	Haleakala	Pan-STARRS 1	EOS	1.3 km	MPC · JPL
712026	2014 QN_{550}	—	August 31, 2014	Haleakala	Pan-STARRS 1	·	2.4 km	MPC · JPL
712027	2014 QB_{558}	—	August 28, 2014	Haleakala	Pan-STARRS 1	EOS	1.2 km	MPC · JPL
712028	2014 QV_{560}	—	August 28, 2014	Haleakala	Pan-STARRS 1	·	780 m	MPC · JPL
712029	2014 QW_{561}	—	August 27, 2014	Haleakala	Pan-STARRS 1	·	630 m	MPC · JPL
712030	2014 QL_{565}	—	August 27, 2014	Haleakala	Pan-STARRS 1	·	500 m	MPC · JPL
712031	2014 QV_{582}	—	August 20, 2014	Haleakala	Pan-STARRS 1	·	840 m	MPC · JPL
712032	2014 QS_{584}	—	August 28, 2014	Haleakala	Pan-STARRS 1	·	2.4 km	MPC · JPL
712033	2014 QJ_{600}	—	August 28, 2014	Haleakala	Pan-STARRS 1	·	890 m	MPC · JPL
712034	2014 QT_{601}	—	August 25, 2014	Haleakala	Pan-STARRS 1	·	2.1 km	MPC · JPL
712035	2014 RQ_{1}	—	March 2, 2009	Mount Lemmon	Mount Lemmon Survey	·	1.2 km	MPC · JPL
712036	2014 RD_{2}	—	August 20, 2009	Kitt Peak	Spacewatch	·	1.4 km	MPC · JPL
712037	2014 RC_{3}	—	September 10, 2010	La Sagra	OAM	RAF	810 m	MPC · JPL
712038	2014 RV_{3}	—	September 1, 2014	Mount Lemmon	Mount Lemmon Survey	·	2.2 km	MPC · JPL
712039	2014 RJ_{5}	—	October 9, 2010	Kitt Peak	Spacewatch	·	1.0 km	MPC · JPL
712040	2014 RA_{10}	—	October 15, 2004	Mount Lemmon	Mount Lemmon Survey	·	590 m	MPC · JPL
712041	2014 RX_{10}	—	October 28, 2005	Mount Lemmon	Mount Lemmon Survey	KOR	1.2 km	MPC · JPL
712042	2014 RU_{14}	—	November 7, 2010	Mount Lemmon	Mount Lemmon Survey	·	1.8 km	MPC · JPL
712043	2014 RK_{15}	—	September 1, 2014	Mount Lemmon	Mount Lemmon Survey	·	2.7 km	MPC · JPL
712044	2014 RT_{20}	—	June 30, 2014	Haleakala	Pan-STARRS 1	·	1.9 km	MPC · JPL
712045	2014 RU_{23}	—	September 28, 2009	Mount Lemmon	Mount Lemmon Survey	·	2.4 km	MPC · JPL
712046	2014 RM_{27}	—	March 10, 2007	Mount Lemmon	Mount Lemmon Survey	·	1.6 km	MPC · JPL
712047	2014 RU_{27}	—	May 10, 2013	Kitt Peak	Spacewatch	EOS	1.5 km	MPC · JPL
712048	2014 RW_{27}	—	September 18, 2009	Mount Lemmon	Mount Lemmon Survey	·	1.3 km	MPC · JPL
712049	2014 RW_{28}	—	August 22, 2014	Haleakala	Pan-STARRS 1	EOS	1.6 km	MPC · JPL
712050	2014 RN_{30}	—	June 30, 2014	Haleakala	Pan-STARRS 1	·	2.3 km	MPC · JPL
712051	2014 RX_{32}	—	February 16, 2012	Haleakala	Pan-STARRS 1	·	1.8 km	MPC · JPL
712052	2014 RV_{34}	—	October 25, 2009	Kitt Peak	Spacewatch	·	3.2 km	MPC · JPL
712053	2014 RF_{35}	—	January 2, 2011	Mount Lemmon	Mount Lemmon Survey	·	1.9 km	MPC · JPL
712054	2014 RP_{37}	—	September 25, 2009	Kitt Peak	Spacewatch	·	1.6 km	MPC · JPL
712055	2014 RK_{38}	—	September 15, 2004	Kitt Peak	Spacewatch	·	490 m	MPC · JPL
712056	2014 RR_{38}	—	March 16, 2007	Mount Lemmon	Mount Lemmon Survey	KOR	1.2 km	MPC · JPL
712057	2014 RY_{38}	—	September 15, 2009	Kitt Peak	Spacewatch	EOS	1.7 km	MPC · JPL
712058	2014 RG_{39}	—	September 26, 2005	Kitt Peak	Spacewatch	·	1.7 km	MPC · JPL
712059	2014 RB_{40}	—	September 28, 1997	Kitt Peak	Spacewatch	·	2.7 km	MPC · JPL
712060	2014 RP_{43}	—	October 10, 2004	Palomar	NEAT	·	2.2 km	MPC · JPL
712061	2014 RQ_{43}	—	October 21, 2003	Kitt Peak	Spacewatch	·	2.7 km	MPC · JPL
712062	2014 RT_{48}	—	September 30, 2003	Kitt Peak	Spacewatch	·	2.8 km	MPC · JPL
712063	2014 RH_{49}	—	September 14, 2014	Mount Lemmon	Mount Lemmon Survey	·	2.7 km	MPC · JPL
712064	2014 RZ_{49}	—	September 29, 2003	Kitt Peak	Spacewatch	EOS	1.6 km	MPC · JPL
712065	2014 RY_{50}	—	August 23, 2014	Haleakala	Pan-STARRS 1	·	1.9 km	MPC · JPL
712066	2014 RJ_{53}	—	September 11, 2004	Kitt Peak	Spacewatch	·	520 m	MPC · JPL
712067	2014 RJ_{55}	—	September 16, 2009	Kitt Peak	Spacewatch	·	1.8 km	MPC · JPL
712068	2014 RX_{57}	—	August 27, 2014	Haleakala	Pan-STARRS 1	THM	1.8 km	MPC · JPL
712069	2014 RZ_{57}	—	February 14, 2002	Cerro Tololo	Deep Lens Survey	·	1.8 km	MPC · JPL
712070	2014 RK_{59}	—	February 25, 2007	Kitt Peak	Spacewatch	KOR	1.3 km	MPC · JPL
712071	2014 RV_{59}	—	April 2, 2006	Kitt Peak	Spacewatch	·	2.4 km	MPC · JPL
712072	2014 RV_{64}	—	September 29, 2009	Mount Lemmon	Mount Lemmon Survey	·	2.5 km	MPC · JPL
712073	2014 RZ_{64}	—	March 14, 2007	Mount Lemmon	Mount Lemmon Survey	EOS	1.6 km	MPC · JPL
712074	2014 RQ_{65}	—	May 15, 2013	Haleakala	Pan-STARRS 1	·	1.9 km	MPC · JPL
712075	2014 RW_{65}	—	September 14, 2014	Kitt Peak	Spacewatch	GEF	1.2 km	MPC · JPL
712076	2014 RF_{66}	—	September 1, 2014	Mount Lemmon	Mount Lemmon Survey	·	2.5 km	MPC · JPL
712077	2014 RH_{66}	—	September 2, 2014	Haleakala	Pan-STARRS 1	·	2.5 km	MPC · JPL
712078	2014 RJ_{66}	—	February 26, 2012	Mount Lemmon	Mount Lemmon Survey	·	1.9 km	MPC · JPL
712079	2014 RO_{66}	—	November 16, 2009	Mount Lemmon	Mount Lemmon Survey	·	1.9 km	MPC · JPL
712080	2014 RP_{66}	—	November 21, 2009	Mount Lemmon	Mount Lemmon Survey	·	3.0 km	MPC · JPL
712081	2014 RD_{67}	—	March 10, 2011	Mount Lemmon	Mount Lemmon Survey	VER	2.2 km	MPC · JPL
712082	2014 RE_{67}	—	September 2, 2014	Haleakala	Pan-STARRS 1	EOS	1.7 km	MPC · JPL
712083	2014 RH_{67}	—	September 2, 2014	Haleakala	Pan-STARRS 1	·	1.8 km	MPC · JPL
712084	2014 RQ_{68}	—	April 17, 2012	Kitt Peak	Spacewatch	EOS	1.9 km	MPC · JPL
712085	2014 RT_{68}	—	September 4, 2014	Haleakala	Pan-STARRS 1	·	2.4 km	MPC · JPL
712086	2014 RK_{69}	—	September 12, 2014	Haleakala	Pan-STARRS 1	·	1.8 km	MPC · JPL
712087	2014 RC_{70}	—	September 4, 2014	Haleakala	Pan-STARRS 1	·	690 m	MPC · JPL
712088	2014 RU_{70}	—	September 11, 2014	Haleakala	Pan-STARRS 1	·	1.9 km	MPC · JPL
712089	2014 RD_{76}	—	September 4, 2014	Haleakala	Pan-STARRS 1	·	1.6 km	MPC · JPL
712090	2014 RD_{77}	—	September 4, 2014	Haleakala	Pan-STARRS 1	·	1.3 km	MPC · JPL
712091	2014 RW_{78}	—	September 1, 2014	Mount Lemmon	Mount Lemmon Survey	·	2.3 km	MPC · JPL
712092	2014 RF_{79}	—	September 3, 2014	Mount Lemmon	Mount Lemmon Survey	VER	2.0 km	MPC · JPL
712093	2014 RF_{80}	—	September 2, 2014	Haleakala	Pan-STARRS 1	·	2.5 km	MPC · JPL
712094	2014 RP_{80}	—	September 2, 2014	Haleakala	Pan-STARRS 1	EOS	1.3 km	MPC · JPL
712095	2014 RW_{80}	—	September 4, 2014	Haleakala	Pan-STARRS 1	·	2.1 km	MPC · JPL
712096	2014 RT_{84}	—	September 2, 2014	Haleakala	Pan-STARRS 1	·	1.2 km	MPC · JPL
712097	2014 RH_{88}	—	September 2, 2014	Haleakala	Pan-STARRS 1	·	500 m	MPC · JPL
712098	2014 RC_{90}	—	October 1, 2006	Kitt Peak	Spacewatch	·	890 m	MPC · JPL
712099	2014 RG_{90}	—	September 1, 2014	Mount Lemmon	Mount Lemmon Survey	·	970 m	MPC · JPL
712100	2014 RS_{91}	—	September 1, 2014	Mount Lemmon	Mount Lemmon Survey	V	490 m	MPC · JPL

== 712101–712200 ==
back to top

Designation			Discovery			Properties		Ref
Permanent	Provisional	Named after	Date	Site	Discoverer(s)	Category	Diam.	Ref
712101	2014 SO	—	March 19, 2010	Kitt Peak	Spacewatch	·	740 m	MPC · JPL
712102	2014 SP_{5}	—	March 9, 2007	Mount Lemmon	Mount Lemmon Survey	TRE	2.1 km	MPC · JPL
712103	2014 SL_{6}	—	February 23, 2012	Mount Lemmon	Mount Lemmon Survey	EOS	1.7 km	MPC · JPL
712104	2014 SW_{7}	—	April 20, 2007	Kitt Peak	Spacewatch	·	630 m	MPC · JPL
712105	2014 SW_{8}	—	February 13, 2007	Mount Lemmon	Mount Lemmon Survey	KOR	1.2 km	MPC · JPL
712106	2014 SV_{10}	—	May 12, 2013	Mount Lemmon	Mount Lemmon Survey	·	1.4 km	MPC · JPL
712107	2014 SM_{12}	—	April 1, 2013	Mount Lemmon	Mount Lemmon Survey	·	520 m	MPC · JPL
712108	2014 SO_{17}	—	February 11, 2011	Mount Lemmon	Mount Lemmon Survey	·	2.3 km	MPC · JPL
712109	2014 SP_{18}	—	October 1, 2005	Mount Lemmon	Mount Lemmon Survey	·	1.6 km	MPC · JPL
712110	2014 SF_{19}	—	January 23, 2011	Mount Lemmon	Mount Lemmon Survey	·	1.7 km	MPC · JPL
712111	2014 SN_{19}	—	September 17, 2014	Haleakala	Pan-STARRS 1	·	530 m	MPC · JPL
712112	2014 SW_{23}	—	April 20, 2007	Kitt Peak	Spacewatch	HYG	2.1 km	MPC · JPL
712113	2014 SU_{24}	—	September 22, 2009	Kitt Peak	Spacewatch	·	1.6 km	MPC · JPL
712114	2014 SQ_{25}	—	August 20, 2014	Haleakala	Pan-STARRS 1	·	2.4 km	MPC · JPL
712115	2014 SK_{29}	—	August 27, 2014	Haleakala	Pan-STARRS 1	EOS	1.4 km	MPC · JPL
712116	2014 SY_{30}	—	November 16, 2009	Mount Lemmon	Mount Lemmon Survey	·	1.7 km	MPC · JPL
712117	2014 SA_{31}	—	March 12, 2007	Mount Lemmon	Mount Lemmon Survey	·	1.8 km	MPC · JPL
712118	2014 SP_{32}	—	February 25, 2006	Mount Lemmon	Mount Lemmon Survey	EOS	1.4 km	MPC · JPL
712119	2014 SJ_{35}	—	March 14, 2012	Mount Lemmon	Mount Lemmon Survey	EOS	1.6 km	MPC · JPL
712120	2014 SN_{35}	—	November 29, 2005	Kitt Peak	Spacewatch	KOR	1.2 km	MPC · JPL
712121	2014 SS_{35}	—	September 17, 2014	Haleakala	Pan-STARRS 1	·	2.5 km	MPC · JPL
712122	2014 SJ_{38}	—	September 17, 2014	Haleakala	Pan-STARRS 1	·	2.3 km	MPC · JPL
712123	2014 SU_{38}	—	September 17, 2014	Haleakala	Pan-STARRS 1	·	2.4 km	MPC · JPL
712124	2014 SJ_{44}	—	February 3, 2008	Mount Lemmon	Mount Lemmon Survey	·	1.0 km	MPC · JPL
712125	2014 SO_{45}	—	March 25, 2007	Mount Lemmon	Mount Lemmon Survey	EOS	1.8 km	MPC · JPL
712126	2014 SQ_{49}	—	September 18, 2010	Mount Lemmon	Mount Lemmon Survey	GEF	1.1 km	MPC · JPL
712127	2014 SH_{51}	—	February 24, 2012	Kitt Peak	Spacewatch	·	2.2 km	MPC · JPL
712128	2014 SG_{53}	—	October 28, 2010	Mount Lemmon	Mount Lemmon Survey	·	1.4 km	MPC · JPL
712129	2014 SQ_{53}	—	September 17, 2014	Haleakala	Pan-STARRS 1	·	1.6 km	MPC · JPL
712130	2014 SW_{54}	—	July 7, 2014	Haleakala	Pan-STARRS 1	·	2.2 km	MPC · JPL
712131	2014 SQ_{55}	—	August 20, 2014	Haleakala	Pan-STARRS 1	·	2.2 km	MPC · JPL
712132	2014 SR_{55}	—	July 31, 2014	Haleakala	Pan-STARRS 1	EOS	1.3 km	MPC · JPL
712133	2014 SW_{57}	—	August 23, 2014	Haleakala	Pan-STARRS 1	·	1.7 km	MPC · JPL
712134	2014 SE_{58}	—	August 23, 2014	Haleakala	Pan-STARRS 1	V	480 m	MPC · JPL
712135	2014 SU_{60}	—	January 23, 2011	Mount Lemmon	Mount Lemmon Survey	·	2.5 km	MPC · JPL
712136	2014 SJ_{63}	—	June 29, 2014	Haleakala	Pan-STARRS 1	EOS	1.8 km	MPC · JPL
712137	2014 SU_{64}	—	June 26, 2014	Haleakala	Pan-STARRS 1	·	1.1 km	MPC · JPL
712138	2014 SJ_{65}	—	January 9, 2006	Kitt Peak	Spacewatch	·	2.2 km	MPC · JPL
712139	2014 SF_{66}	—	July 30, 2014	Haleakala	Pan-STARRS 1	·	1.7 km	MPC · JPL
712140	2014 SP_{70}	—	September 21, 2009	Mount Lemmon	Mount Lemmon Survey	EOS	1.5 km	MPC · JPL
712141	2014 SA_{71}	—	November 17, 2006	Mount Lemmon	Mount Lemmon Survey	WIT	820 m	MPC · JPL
712142	2014 SF_{71}	—	February 7, 2013	Kitt Peak	Spacewatch	·	2.1 km	MPC · JPL
712143	2014 SA_{72}	—	April 15, 2013	Haleakala	Pan-STARRS 1	·	1.9 km	MPC · JPL
712144	2014 SP_{72}	—	April 15, 2007	Mount Lemmon	Mount Lemmon Survey	·	2.3 km	MPC · JPL
712145	2014 SR_{72}	—	July 30, 2014	Kitt Peak	Spacewatch	·	1.3 km	MPC · JPL
712146	2014 SS_{75}	—	September 18, 2014	Haleakala	Pan-STARRS 1	·	2.5 km	MPC · JPL
712147	2014 SM_{76}	—	September 18, 2014	Haleakala	Pan-STARRS 1	·	1.6 km	MPC · JPL
712148	2014 SZ_{76}	—	October 16, 2009	Mount Lemmon	Mount Lemmon Survey	·	2.6 km	MPC · JPL
712149	2014 SH_{77}	—	September 26, 2009	Mount Lemmon	Mount Lemmon Survey	EOS	1.4 km	MPC · JPL
712150	2014 SN_{79}	—	October 29, 1994	Kitt Peak	Spacewatch	TEL	1.1 km	MPC · JPL
712151	2014 SR_{79}	—	March 9, 2008	Kitt Peak	Spacewatch	·	1.6 km	MPC · JPL
712152	2014 SX_{79}	—	July 25, 2014	Haleakala	Pan-STARRS 1	·	2.2 km	MPC · JPL
712153	2014 SJ_{80}	—	August 28, 2014	Haleakala	Pan-STARRS 1	EOS	910 m	MPC · JPL
712154	2014 SB_{81}	—	February 10, 2011	Mount Lemmon	Mount Lemmon Survey	·	2.4 km	MPC · JPL
712155	2014 SW_{82}	—	January 17, 2009	Kitt Peak	Spacewatch	·	600 m	MPC · JPL
712156	2014 SV_{83}	—	February 8, 2011	Mount Lemmon	Mount Lemmon Survey	·	2.0 km	MPC · JPL
712157	2014 SO_{85}	—	March 27, 2012	Kitt Peak	Spacewatch	·	2.2 km	MPC · JPL
712158	2014 SQ_{85}	—	October 25, 2005	Kitt Peak	Spacewatch	·	1.5 km	MPC · JPL
712159	2014 SP_{89}	—	August 30, 2014	Kitt Peak	Spacewatch	·	540 m	MPC · JPL
712160	2014 SC_{90}	—	September 30, 2003	Kitt Peak	Spacewatch	·	2.4 km	MPC · JPL
712161	2014 SM_{90}	—	September 30, 2003	Kitt Peak	Spacewatch	·	3.0 km	MPC · JPL
712162	2014 SY_{91}	—	February 27, 2012	Haleakala	Pan-STARRS 1	·	2.0 km	MPC · JPL
712163	2014 SK_{92}	—	August 27, 2014	Haleakala	Pan-STARRS 1	·	1.6 km	MPC · JPL
712164	2014 SZ_{92}	—	October 18, 2007	Mount Lemmon	Mount Lemmon Survey	·	850 m	MPC · JPL
712165	2014 SF_{93}	—	April 19, 2012	Mount Lemmon	Mount Lemmon Survey	·	2.4 km	MPC · JPL
712166	2014 SB_{94}	—	January 27, 2006	Mount Lemmon	Mount Lemmon Survey	·	1.9 km	MPC · JPL
712167	2014 SE_{97}	—	March 28, 2012	Mount Lemmon	Mount Lemmon Survey	KOR	1.0 km	MPC · JPL
712168	2014 SP_{97}	—	September 10, 2007	Kitt Peak	Spacewatch	·	610 m	MPC · JPL
712169	2014 SA_{100}	—	February 25, 2007	Mount Lemmon	Mount Lemmon Survey	·	1.4 km	MPC · JPL
712170	2014 SF_{102}	—	September 20, 2009	Kitt Peak	Spacewatch	·	1.2 km	MPC · JPL
712171	2014 SC_{103}	—	April 26, 2006	Cerro Tololo	Deep Ecliptic Survey	VER	2.1 km	MPC · JPL
712172	2014 SY_{103}	—	August 27, 2014	Haleakala	Pan-STARRS 1	·	570 m	MPC · JPL
712173	2014 SH_{104}	—	February 24, 2012	Haleakala	Pan-STARRS 1	·	2.6 km	MPC · JPL
712174	2014 SP_{105}	—	March 26, 2001	Kitt Peak	Deep Ecliptic Survey	·	2.4 km	MPC · JPL
712175	2014 SJ_{106}	—	September 18, 2014	Haleakala	Pan-STARRS 1	·	750 m	MPC · JPL
712176	2014 ST_{106}	—	October 16, 2009	Mount Lemmon	Mount Lemmon Survey	·	1.7 km	MPC · JPL
712177	2014 SL_{107}	—	October 16, 2009	Mount Lemmon	Mount Lemmon Survey	·	1.7 km	MPC · JPL
712178	2014 SS_{108}	—	September 28, 2003	Apache Point	SDSS Collaboration	THM	1.5 km	MPC · JPL
712179	2014 SQ_{109}	—	September 26, 2009	Kitt Peak	Spacewatch	·	1.9 km	MPC · JPL
712180	2014 SN_{110}	—	September 15, 2014	Mount Lemmon	Mount Lemmon Survey	·	550 m	MPC · JPL
712181	2014 SA_{112}	—	September 11, 2007	Mount Lemmon	Mount Lemmon Survey	·	650 m	MPC · JPL
712182	2014 SU_{112}	—	July 29, 2014	Haleakala	Pan-STARRS 1	·	2.2 km	MPC · JPL
712183	2014 SG_{113}	—	September 19, 2009	Kitt Peak	Spacewatch	·	2.0 km	MPC · JPL
712184	2014 SF_{115}	—	May 1, 2006	Mauna Kea	P. A. Wiegert	THM	2.1 km	MPC · JPL
712185	2014 SF_{116}	—	January 23, 2006	Kitt Peak	Spacewatch	·	2.8 km	MPC · JPL
712186	2014 SJ_{116}	—	September 18, 2014	Haleakala	Pan-STARRS 1	·	530 m	MPC · JPL
712187	2014 SZ_{116}	—	April 18, 2012	Mount Lemmon	Mount Lemmon Survey	·	1.6 km	MPC · JPL
712188	2014 SM_{119}	—	September 15, 2009	Kitt Peak	Spacewatch	EOS	1.6 km	MPC · JPL
712189	2014 SZ_{119}	—	September 28, 2003	Apache Point	SDSS Collaboration	·	2.5 km	MPC · JPL
712190	2014 SK_{125}	—	February 11, 2011	Mount Lemmon	Mount Lemmon Survey	·	2.7 km	MPC · JPL
712191	2014 SO_{126}	—	February 1, 2006	Kitt Peak	Spacewatch	·	2.1 km	MPC · JPL
712192	2014 SO_{127}	—	November 20, 2008	Kitt Peak	Spacewatch	·	530 m	MPC · JPL
712193	2014 SU_{128}	—	March 6, 2013	Haleakala	Pan-STARRS 1	·	610 m	MPC · JPL
712194	2014 SE_{129}	—	November 18, 2011	Mount Lemmon	Mount Lemmon Survey	NYS	880 m	MPC · JPL
712195	2014 SJ_{129}	—	March 26, 2007	Kitt Peak	Spacewatch	THM	1.8 km	MPC · JPL
712196	2014 SK_{129}	—	September 18, 2014	Haleakala	Pan-STARRS 1	·	640 m	MPC · JPL
712197	2014 SE_{130}	—	March 31, 2012	Mount Lemmon	Mount Lemmon Survey	EOS	1.5 km	MPC · JPL
712198	2014 SS_{135}	—	September 18, 2014	Haleakala	Pan-STARRS 1	EOS	1.8 km	MPC · JPL
712199	2014 SB_{138}	—	February 23, 2012	Mount Lemmon	Mount Lemmon Survey	·	1.9 km	MPC · JPL
712200	2014 SM_{143}	—	September 17, 2014	Haleakala	Pan-STARRS 1	APO · PHA	300 m	MPC · JPL

== 712201–712300 ==
back to top

Designation			Discovery			Properties		Ref
Permanent	Provisional	Named after	Date	Site	Discoverer(s)	Category	Diam.	Ref
712201	2014 SL_{145}	—	September 15, 2009	Kitt Peak	Spacewatch	·	1.9 km	MPC · JPL
712202	2014 SR_{145}	—	August 28, 2014	Haleakala	Pan-STARRS 1	·	2.4 km	MPC · JPL
712203	2014 SO_{147}	—	August 27, 2014	Haleakala	Pan-STARRS 1	·	1.4 km	MPC · JPL
712204	2014 SC_{148}	—	September 2, 2014	Haleakala	Pan-STARRS 1	·	1.8 km	MPC · JPL
712205	2014 SU_{148}	—	December 5, 2005	Mount Lemmon	Mount Lemmon Survey	·	1.3 km	MPC · JPL
712206	2014 SO_{150}	—	August 22, 2014	Haleakala	Pan-STARRS 1	EOS	1.5 km	MPC · JPL
712207	2014 ST_{150}	—	August 22, 2014	Haleakala	Pan-STARRS 1	·	630 m	MPC · JPL
712208	2014 SS_{151}	—	September 23, 1998	Kitt Peak	Spacewatch	·	2.0 km	MPC · JPL
712209	2014 SK_{153}	—	January 31, 2006	Kitt Peak	Spacewatch	EOS	1.5 km	MPC · JPL
712210	2014 SA_{154}	—	September 26, 2008	Mount Lemmon	Mount Lemmon Survey	TIR	2.3 km	MPC · JPL
712211	2014 SQ_{155}	—	August 28, 2014	Haleakala	Pan-STARRS 1	·	700 m	MPC · JPL
712212	2014 SB_{156}	—	September 14, 2014	Mount Lemmon	Mount Lemmon Survey	·	2.6 km	MPC · JPL
712213	2014 SN_{158}	—	September 19, 2014	Haleakala	Pan-STARRS 1	·	2.5 km	MPC · JPL
712214	2014 SP_{158}	—	September 18, 2003	Kitt Peak	Spacewatch	·	2.2 km	MPC · JPL
712215	2014 SA_{162}	—	September 19, 2014	Haleakala	Pan-STARRS 1	·	2.4 km	MPC · JPL
712216	2014 SX_{162}	—	August 25, 2014	Haleakala	Pan-STARRS 1	EOS	1.8 km	MPC · JPL
712217	2014 SC_{163}	—	August 25, 2014	Haleakala	Pan-STARRS 1	·	2.2 km	MPC · JPL
712218	2014 ST_{163}	—	March 9, 2011	Mount Lemmon	Mount Lemmon Survey	·	2.3 km	MPC · JPL
712219	2014 SD_{164}	—	September 19, 2014	Haleakala	Pan-STARRS 1	·	2.5 km	MPC · JPL
712220	2014 SE_{166}	—	January 29, 2011	Mount Lemmon	Mount Lemmon Survey	·	2.1 km	MPC · JPL
712221	2014 SK_{166}	—	November 4, 2004	Kitt Peak	Spacewatch	V	540 m	MPC · JPL
712222	2014 SZ_{166}	—	September 15, 2009	Kitt Peak	Spacewatch	·	2.3 km	MPC · JPL
712223	2014 SF_{171}	—	December 27, 2005	Kitt Peak	Spacewatch	EOS	1.7 km	MPC · JPL
712224	2014 SQ_{171}	—	March 10, 2008	Mount Lemmon	Mount Lemmon Survey	·	2.3 km	MPC · JPL
712225	2014 SX_{173}	—	October 20, 2011	Mount Lemmon	Mount Lemmon Survey	·	580 m	MPC · JPL
712226	2014 SG_{174}	—	September 20, 2014	Haleakala	Pan-STARRS 1	·	1.7 km	MPC · JPL
712227	2014 ST_{174}	—	January 30, 2012	Kitt Peak	Spacewatch	·	1.4 km	MPC · JPL
712228	2014 SU_{174}	—	October 1, 2009	Mount Lemmon	Mount Lemmon Survey	·	1.9 km	MPC · JPL
712229	2014 SN_{177}	—	March 17, 2012	Mount Lemmon	Mount Lemmon Survey	EOS	1.4 km	MPC · JPL
712230	2014 ST_{177}	—	February 28, 2012	Haleakala	Pan-STARRS 1	KOR	1.1 km	MPC · JPL
712231	2014 SY_{177}	—	February 27, 2006	Kitt Peak	Spacewatch	VER	2.3 km	MPC · JPL
712232	2014 SF_{178}	—	February 26, 2012	Kitt Peak	Spacewatch	·	1.9 km	MPC · JPL
712233	2014 SX_{178}	—	August 27, 2014	Haleakala	Pan-STARRS 1	·	500 m	MPC · JPL
712234	2014 SA_{183}	—	December 22, 2005	Kitt Peak	Spacewatch	·	510 m	MPC · JPL
712235	2014 SY_{187}	—	September 28, 2009	Mount Lemmon	Mount Lemmon Survey	·	1.8 km	MPC · JPL
712236	2014 SE_{188}	—	April 26, 2006	Cerro Tololo	Deep Ecliptic Survey	·	1.9 km	MPC · JPL
712237	2014 SX_{190}	—	March 12, 2013	Mount Lemmon	Mount Lemmon Survey	·	570 m	MPC · JPL
712238	2014 SL_{193}	—	September 21, 2009	Kitt Peak	Spacewatch	·	1.6 km	MPC · JPL
712239	2014 SZ_{193}	—	September 20, 2014	Haleakala	Pan-STARRS 1	EOS	1.5 km	MPC · JPL
712240	2014 SC_{199}	—	January 29, 2011	Kitt Peak	Spacewatch	·	1.9 km	MPC · JPL
712241	2014 SC_{200}	—	November 7, 2005	Mauna Kea	A. Boattini	·	760 m	MPC · JPL
712242	2014 SC_{203}	—	August 27, 2014	Haleakala	Pan-STARRS 1	HYG	2.2 km	MPC · JPL
712243	2014 SZ_{203}	—	October 24, 2009	Kitt Peak	Spacewatch	·	2.4 km	MPC · JPL
712244	2014 SO_{206}	—	September 9, 2008	Mount Lemmon	Mount Lemmon Survey	·	2.0 km	MPC · JPL
712245	2014 SG_{209}	—	April 4, 2011	Mount Lemmon	Mount Lemmon Survey	EOS	1.7 km	MPC · JPL
712246	2014 SH_{209}	—	September 6, 2014	Mount Lemmon	Mount Lemmon Survey	·	640 m	MPC · JPL
712247	2014 SR_{211}	—	September 23, 2008	Mount Lemmon	Mount Lemmon Survey	·	2.3 km	MPC · JPL
712248	2014 SN_{212}	—	May 31, 2012	Mount Lemmon	Mount Lemmon Survey	EOS	1.7 km	MPC · JPL
712249	2014 SE_{220}	—	July 9, 2013	Haleakala	Pan-STARRS 1	·	2.9 km	MPC · JPL
712250	2014 SB_{222}	—	September 20, 2014	Mount Lemmon	Mount Lemmon Survey	·	3.2 km	MPC · JPL
712251	2014 SG_{223}	—	July 7, 2014	Haleakala	Pan-STARRS 1	·	2.3 km	MPC · JPL
712252	2014 SY_{226}	—	September 2, 2014	Haleakala	Pan-STARRS 1	·	750 m	MPC · JPL
712253	2014 ST_{227}	—	September 19, 2014	Haleakala	Pan-STARRS 1	·	2.2 km	MPC · JPL
712254	2014 SD_{229}	—	March 6, 2013	Haleakala	Pan-STARRS 1	·	700 m	MPC · JPL
712255	2014 SU_{229}	—	September 19, 2014	Haleakala	Pan-STARRS 1	·	550 m	MPC · JPL
712256	2014 SY_{229}	—	September 19, 2014	Haleakala	Pan-STARRS 1	AGN	1.1 km	MPC · JPL
712257	2014 SQ_{230}	—	September 14, 2014	Mount Lemmon	Mount Lemmon Survey	·	2.1 km	MPC · JPL
712258	2014 SM_{231}	—	March 14, 2013	Mount Lemmon	Mount Lemmon Survey	·	690 m	MPC · JPL
712259	2014 SO_{231}	—	September 19, 2014	Haleakala	Pan-STARRS 1	·	1.8 km	MPC · JPL
712260	2014 SA_{232}	—	September 19, 2009	Mount Lemmon	Mount Lemmon Survey	·	1.8 km	MPC · JPL
712261	2014 SB_{232}	—	April 19, 2006	Kitt Peak	Spacewatch	·	3.0 km	MPC · JPL
712262	2014 SP_{232}	—	March 17, 2007	Kitt Peak	Spacewatch	·	2.3 km	MPC · JPL
712263	2014 SJ_{233}	—	September 18, 2003	Kitt Peak	Spacewatch	·	2.5 km	MPC · JPL
712264	2014 SB_{235}	—	September 20, 2014	Haleakala	Pan-STARRS 1	·	610 m	MPC · JPL
712265	2014 SK_{237}	—	August 25, 2014	Haleakala	Pan-STARRS 1	EOS	1.6 km	MPC · JPL
712266	2014 SL_{239}	—	June 20, 2014	Haleakala	Pan-STARRS 1	·	1.2 km	MPC · JPL
712267	2014 SR_{240}	—	November 7, 2005	Mauna Kea	A. Boattini	V	550 m	MPC · JPL
712268	2014 SE_{241}	—	July 31, 2014	Haleakala	Pan-STARRS 1	·	1.7 km	MPC · JPL
712269	2014 SF_{241}	—	September 17, 2004	Anderson Mesa	LONEOS	·	680 m	MPC · JPL
712270	2014 SL_{241}	—	December 15, 2010	Mount Lemmon	Mount Lemmon Survey	·	1.9 km	MPC · JPL
712271	2014 SN_{241}	—	July 31, 2014	Haleakala	Pan-STARRS 1	·	2.3 km	MPC · JPL
712272	2014 SZ_{242}	—	February 13, 2013	Haleakala	Pan-STARRS 1	·	590 m	MPC · JPL
712273	2014 SS_{243}	—	January 13, 2011	Mount Lemmon	Mount Lemmon Survey	·	2.1 km	MPC · JPL
712274	2014 SJ_{244}	—	November 8, 2009	Mount Lemmon	Mount Lemmon Survey	EOS	1.5 km	MPC · JPL
712275	2014 SS_{244}	—	July 31, 2014	Haleakala	Pan-STARRS 1	·	620 m	MPC · JPL
712276	2014 SU_{246}	—	September 22, 2014	Haleakala	Pan-STARRS 1	·	1.8 km	MPC · JPL
712277	2014 SC_{247}	—	February 20, 2012	Haleakala	Pan-STARRS 1	·	3.0 km	MPC · JPL
712278	2014 SC_{248}	—	September 2, 2014	Haleakala	Pan-STARRS 1	·	2.7 km	MPC · JPL
712279	2014 SH_{249}	—	July 31, 2014	Haleakala	Pan-STARRS 1	EOS	1.4 km	MPC · JPL
712280	2014 SV_{250}	—	September 15, 2006	Kitt Peak	Spacewatch	·	1.1 km	MPC · JPL
712281	2014 SG_{251}	—	January 26, 2006	Mount Lemmon	Mount Lemmon Survey	EOS	1.5 km	MPC · JPL
712282	2014 SV_{253}	—	September 2, 2014	Haleakala	Pan-STARRS 1	·	2.4 km	MPC · JPL
712283	2014 SD_{255}	—	September 3, 2008	Kitt Peak	Spacewatch	·	2.3 km	MPC · JPL
712284	2014 SJ_{255}	—	September 11, 1994	Kitt Peak	Spacewatch	·	2.0 km	MPC · JPL
712285	2014 SC_{261}	—	February 29, 2008	Mount Lemmon	Mount Lemmon Survey	H	340 m	MPC · JPL
712286	2014 SV_{263}	—	August 31, 2014	Kitt Peak	Spacewatch	·	1.8 km	MPC · JPL
712287	2014 SY_{269}	—	December 25, 2005	Kitt Peak	Spacewatch	·	2.9 km	MPC · JPL
712288	2014 SH_{270}	—	September 20, 2014	Haleakala	Pan-STARRS 1	·	580 m	MPC · JPL
712289	2014 SN_{272}	—	August 27, 2014	Haleakala	Pan-STARRS 1	·	2.0 km	MPC · JPL
712290	2014 SR_{275}	—	February 28, 2009	Mount Lemmon	Mount Lemmon Survey	·	790 m	MPC · JPL
712291	2014 SQ_{278}	—	February 25, 2006	Mount Lemmon	Mount Lemmon Survey	·	2.6 km	MPC · JPL
712292	2014 SX_{279}	—	April 10, 2013	Haleakala	Pan-STARRS 1	·	840 m	MPC · JPL
712293	2014 SG_{283}	—	March 29, 2012	Haleakala	Pan-STARRS 1	·	2.4 km	MPC · JPL
712294	2014 SS_{286}	—	September 29, 2009	Mount Lemmon	Mount Lemmon Survey	·	1.5 km	MPC · JPL
712295	2014 SF_{295}	—	May 28, 2014	Haleakala	Pan-STARRS 1	·	3.6 km	MPC · JPL
712296	2014 SO_{295}	—	August 28, 2014	Haleakala	Pan-STARRS 1	·	2.6 km	MPC · JPL
712297	2014 SA_{296}	—	January 19, 2012	Kitt Peak	Spacewatch	·	1.7 km	MPC · JPL
712298	2014 SC_{298}	—	March 13, 2012	Haleakala	Pan-STARRS 1	·	3.0 km	MPC · JPL
712299	2014 SF_{298}	—	September 25, 2014	Kitt Peak	Spacewatch	·	2.7 km	MPC · JPL
712300	2014 SJ_{300}	—	September 28, 2003	Kitt Peak	Spacewatch	EOS	1.7 km	MPC · JPL

== 712301–712400 ==
back to top

Designation			Discovery			Properties		Ref
Permanent	Provisional	Named after	Date	Site	Discoverer(s)	Category	Diam.	Ref
712301	2014 SA_{303}	—	January 13, 2011	Mount Lemmon	Mount Lemmon Survey	·	2.5 km	MPC · JPL
712302	2014 SB_{307}	—	April 16, 2013	Cerro Tololo	DECam	·	570 m	MPC · JPL
712303	2014 SD_{308}	—	March 11, 2002	Palomar	NEAT	·	730 m	MPC · JPL
712304	2014 SK_{310}	—	July 29, 2014	Haleakala	Pan-STARRS 1	·	1.7 km	MPC · JPL
712305	2014 SB_{311}	—	September 13, 2014	Haleakala	Pan-STARRS 1	EOS	1.8 km	MPC · JPL
712306	2014 SM_{311}	—	January 30, 2012	Mount Lemmon	Mount Lemmon Survey	ARM	4.1 km	MPC · JPL
712307	2014 SV_{314}	—	March 22, 2001	Kitt Peak	SKADS	·	2.0 km	MPC · JPL
712308	2014 SL_{317}	—	September 11, 2004	Kitt Peak	Spacewatch	KOR	1.1 km	MPC · JPL
712309	2014 SU_{317}	—	September 23, 2014	Haleakala	Pan-STARRS 1	·	3.0 km	MPC · JPL
712310	2014 SY_{317}	—	October 21, 1997	Kitt Peak	Spacewatch	THM	2.1 km	MPC · JPL
712311	2014 SL_{318}	—	March 9, 2005	Kitt Peak	Deep Ecliptic Survey	·	1.9 km	MPC · JPL
712312	2014 SQ_{319}	—	April 5, 2011	Mount Lemmon	Mount Lemmon Survey	·	2.2 km	MPC · JPL
712313	2014 SM_{320}	—	September 30, 2003	Kitt Peak	Spacewatch	·	2.1 km	MPC · JPL
712314	2014 SN_{322}	—	November 25, 2011	Haleakala	Pan-STARRS 1	·	770 m	MPC · JPL
712315	2014 SF_{324}	—	June 7, 2013	Haleakala	Pan-STARRS 1	·	2.0 km	MPC · JPL
712316	2014 SM_{328}	—	July 1, 2013	Haleakala	Pan-STARRS 1	·	3.1 km	MPC · JPL
712317	2014 SY_{328}	—	September 2, 2014	Haleakala	Pan-STARRS 1	·	580 m	MPC · JPL
712318	2014 SG_{329}	—	October 27, 2009	Kitt Peak	Spacewatch	·	1.3 km	MPC · JPL
712319	2014 SP_{329}	—	March 24, 2012	Mount Lemmon	Mount Lemmon Survey	·	2.2 km	MPC · JPL
712320	2014 ST_{329}	—	November 19, 2009	Kitt Peak	Spacewatch	·	2.6 km	MPC · JPL
712321	2014 SY_{329}	—	October 21, 2011	Mount Lemmon	Mount Lemmon Survey	·	800 m	MPC · JPL
712322	2014 ST_{331}	—	October 24, 2009	Kitt Peak	Spacewatch	EOS	1.4 km	MPC · JPL
712323	2014 ST_{332}	—	September 14, 2014	Mount Lemmon	Mount Lemmon Survey	·	620 m	MPC · JPL
712324	2014 SZ_{336}	—	February 17, 2007	Kitt Peak	Spacewatch	·	2.1 km	MPC · JPL
712325	2014 SH_{337}	—	September 30, 2014	Kitt Peak	Spacewatch	·	2.7 km	MPC · JPL
712326	2014 SL_{340}	—	August 15, 2009	Kitt Peak	Spacewatch	·	1.6 km	MPC · JPL
712327	2014 SR_{340}	—	September 19, 2014	Haleakala	Pan-STARRS 1	·	2.7 km	MPC · JPL
712328	2014 SN_{342}	—	September 29, 2014	Haleakala	Pan-STARRS 1	·	2.5 km	MPC · JPL
712329	2014 SL_{343}	—	September 14, 2014	Kitt Peak	Spacewatch	(1338) (FLO)	530 m	MPC · JPL
712330	2014 SV_{354}	—	November 10, 2009	Mount Lemmon	Mount Lemmon Survey	·	1.9 km	MPC · JPL
712331	2014 SY_{354}	—	June 18, 2013	Haleakala	Pan-STARRS 1	·	2.2 km	MPC · JPL
712332	2014 SZ_{354}	—	October 7, 2008	Mount Lemmon	Mount Lemmon Survey	·	2.9 km	MPC · JPL
712333	2014 SR_{355}	—	November 1, 2000	Kitt Peak	Spacewatch	·	1.9 km	MPC · JPL
712334	2014 SU_{355}	—	September 30, 2014	Kitt Peak	Spacewatch	·	2.0 km	MPC · JPL
712335	2014 SB_{356}	—	September 28, 2003	Kitt Peak	Spacewatch	·	2.4 km	MPC · JPL
712336	2014 SE_{356}	—	November 2, 2007	Kitt Peak	Spacewatch	·	870 m	MPC · JPL
712337	2014 SN_{356}	—	September 28, 2003	Kitt Peak	Spacewatch	·	2.3 km	MPC · JPL
712338	2014 SP_{356}	—	March 6, 2011	Mount Lemmon	Mount Lemmon Survey	·	1.8 km	MPC · JPL
712339	2014 ST_{356}	—	April 11, 2013	Mount Lemmon	Mount Lemmon Survey	·	2.2 km	MPC · JPL
712340	2014 SW_{356}	—	November 10, 2009	Kitt Peak	Spacewatch	·	3.0 km	MPC · JPL
712341	2014 SK_{357}	—	September 18, 2014	Haleakala	Pan-STARRS 1	·	2.3 km	MPC · JPL
712342	2014 SS_{357}	—	September 18, 2014	Haleakala	Pan-STARRS 1	·	2.8 km	MPC · JPL
712343	2014 SF_{359}	—	February 21, 2007	Kitt Peak	Deep Ecliptic Survey	KOR	1.2 km	MPC · JPL
712344	2014 SG_{359}	—	September 19, 2014	Haleakala	Pan-STARRS 1	·	530 m	MPC · JPL
712345	2014 SP_{359}	—	September 19, 2014	Haleakala	Pan-STARRS 1	·	2.5 km	MPC · JPL
712346	2014 SC_{360}	—	September 19, 2014	Haleakala	Pan-STARRS 1	·	2.0 km	MPC · JPL
712347	2014 SE_{360}	—	January 28, 2011	Mount Lemmon	Mount Lemmon Survey	·	1.8 km	MPC · JPL
712348	2014 SC_{361}	—	August 9, 2013	Haleakala	Pan-STARRS 1	EOS	1.7 km	MPC · JPL
712349	2014 SK_{361}	—	September 22, 2014	Haleakala	Pan-STARRS 1	·	2.5 km	MPC · JPL
712350	2014 SU_{364}	—	October 16, 2009	Mount Lemmon	Mount Lemmon Survey	·	2.5 km	MPC · JPL
712351	2014 SX_{370}	—	January 25, 2006	Kitt Peak	Spacewatch	·	2.0 km	MPC · JPL
712352	2014 SY_{370}	—	September 28, 2014	Haleakala	Pan-STARRS 1	·	2.5 km	MPC · JPL
712353	2014 SA_{371}	—	November 6, 2015	ESA OGS	ESA OGS	·	2.8 km	MPC · JPL
712354	2014 SB_{380}	—	September 29, 2014	Haleakala	Pan-STARRS 1	·	2.9 km	MPC · JPL
712355	2014 SH_{380}	—	August 28, 2014	Kitt Peak	Spacewatch	·	2.7 km	MPC · JPL
712356	2014 ST_{384}	—	September 17, 2014	Haleakala	Pan-STARRS 1	·	2.4 km	MPC · JPL
712357	2014 SV_{384}	—	September 26, 2014	Catalina	CSS	LUT	3.9 km	MPC · JPL
712358	2014 SU_{385}	—	September 19, 2014	Haleakala	Pan-STARRS 1	EOS	1.5 km	MPC · JPL
712359	2014 SO_{386}	—	September 23, 2014	Mount Lemmon	Mount Lemmon Survey	615	1.3 km	MPC · JPL
712360	2014 SS_{386}	—	September 19, 2014	Haleakala	Pan-STARRS 1	·	2.0 km	MPC · JPL
712361	2014 SD_{388}	—	September 20, 2014	Haleakala	Pan-STARRS 1	·	2.2 km	MPC · JPL
712362	2014 ST_{390}	—	September 19, 2014	Haleakala	Pan-STARRS 1	·	2.4 km	MPC · JPL
712363	2014 SG_{391}	—	September 17, 2014	Haleakala	Pan-STARRS 1	EOS	1.7 km	MPC · JPL
712364	2014 SO_{391}	—	September 18, 2014	Haleakala	Pan-STARRS 1	·	2.0 km	MPC · JPL
712365	2014 SX_{391}	—	September 22, 2014	Haleakala	Pan-STARRS 1	·	2.6 km	MPC · JPL
712366	2014 SS_{394}	—	September 19, 2014	Haleakala	Pan-STARRS 1	EOS	1.5 km	MPC · JPL
712367	2014 SY_{395}	—	September 19, 2014	Haleakala	Pan-STARRS 1	·	720 m	MPC · JPL
712368	2014 SW_{396}	—	September 20, 2014	Mount Lemmon	Mount Lemmon Survey	EOS	1.3 km	MPC · JPL
712369	2014 SD_{399}	—	September 20, 2014	Haleakala	Pan-STARRS 1	·	1.7 km	MPC · JPL
712370	2014 TB_{1}	—	December 10, 2009	Mount Lemmon	Mount Lemmon Survey	·	2.7 km	MPC · JPL
712371	2014 TU_{1}	—	January 16, 2005	Mauna Kea	Veillet, C.	·	2.3 km	MPC · JPL
712372	2014 TO_{2}	—	September 19, 2014	Haleakala	Pan-STARRS 1	·	2.1 km	MPC · JPL
712373	2014 TF_{3}	—	October 22, 2009	Mount Lemmon	Mount Lemmon Survey	·	1.5 km	MPC · JPL
712374	2014 TX_{4}	—	September 29, 2003	Kitt Peak	Spacewatch	THM	1.9 km	MPC · JPL
712375	2014 TC_{7}	—	October 23, 2003	Kitt Peak	Spacewatch	·	3.1 km	MPC · JPL
712376	2014 TY_{10}	—	January 27, 2012	Mount Lemmon	Mount Lemmon Survey	·	970 m	MPC · JPL
712377	2014 TS_{14}	—	October 1, 2014	Haleakala	Pan-STARRS 1	V	490 m	MPC · JPL
712378	2014 TL_{15}	—	September 25, 2014	Kitt Peak	Spacewatch	·	2.6 km	MPC · JPL
712379	2014 TU_{15}	—	September 30, 2003	Kitt Peak	Spacewatch	EOS	1.6 km	MPC · JPL
712380	2014 TY_{15}	—	August 25, 2014	Haleakala	Pan-STARRS 1	EOS	1.3 km	MPC · JPL
712381	2014 TP_{20}	—	October 22, 2003	Kitt Peak	Spacewatch	·	2.7 km	MPC · JPL
712382	2014 TO_{21}	—	December 26, 2009	Kitt Peak	Spacewatch	THM	2.0 km	MPC · JPL
712383	2014 TD_{22}	—	November 14, 1998	Kitt Peak	Spacewatch	·	2.0 km	MPC · JPL
712384	2014 TG_{24}	—	October 2, 2014	Haleakala	Pan-STARRS 1	EOS	1.7 km	MPC · JPL
712385	2014 TN_{24}	—	December 28, 2011	Kitt Peak	Spacewatch	·	560 m	MPC · JPL
712386	2014 TP_{24}	—	January 30, 2006	Kitt Peak	Spacewatch	·	2.1 km	MPC · JPL
712387	2014 TX_{24}	—	September 14, 2014	Mount Lemmon	Mount Lemmon Survey	·	2.3 km	MPC · JPL
712388	2014 TX_{25}	—	February 28, 2012	Haleakala	Pan-STARRS 1	EOS	1.7 km	MPC · JPL
712389	2014 TS_{26}	—	November 24, 2009	Mount Lemmon	Mount Lemmon Survey	·	1.6 km	MPC · JPL
712390	2014 TN_{28}	—	September 2, 2014	Haleakala	Pan-STARRS 1	·	1.9 km	MPC · JPL
712391	2014 TU_{30}	—	March 16, 2013	Mount Lemmon	Mount Lemmon Survey	·	530 m	MPC · JPL
712392	2014 TL_{35}	—	October 5, 2014	Haleakala	Pan-STARRS 1	·	1.2 km	MPC · JPL
712393	2014 TS_{41}	—	October 1, 2003	Kitt Peak	Spacewatch	·	2.2 km	MPC · JPL
712394	2014 TU_{43}	—	May 30, 2006	Mount Lemmon	Mount Lemmon Survey	·	2.7 km	MPC · JPL
712395	2014 TQ_{44}	—	September 24, 2014	Kitt Peak	Spacewatch	·	2.7 km	MPC · JPL
712396	2014 TW_{49}	—	October 23, 2009	Mount Lemmon	Mount Lemmon Survey	EOS	1.5 km	MPC · JPL
712397	2014 TO_{50}	—	February 22, 2006	Mount Lemmon	Mount Lemmon Survey	·	3.1 km	MPC · JPL
712398	2014 TA_{51}	—	October 14, 2014	Mount Lemmon	Mount Lemmon Survey	·	2.3 km	MPC · JPL
712399	2014 TN_{51}	—	October 14, 2014	Mount Lemmon	Mount Lemmon Survey	EOS	2.0 km	MPC · JPL
712400	2014 TB_{53}	—	October 14, 2014	Mount Lemmon	Mount Lemmon Survey	·	2.5 km	MPC · JPL

== 712401–712500 ==
back to top

Designation			Discovery			Properties		Ref
Permanent	Provisional	Named after	Date	Site	Discoverer(s)	Category	Diam.	Ref
712401	2014 TQ_{53}	—	August 31, 2014	Haleakala	Pan-STARRS 1	·	3.0 km	MPC · JPL
712402	2014 TO_{56}	—	October 15, 2014	Mount Lemmon	Mount Lemmon Survey	·	620 m	MPC · JPL
712403	2014 TZ_{56}	—	October 21, 2003	Palomar	NEAT	·	2.7 km	MPC · JPL
712404	2014 TU_{58}	—	October 13, 2014	Kitt Peak	Spacewatch	·	620 m	MPC · JPL
712405	2014 TH_{62}	—	February 26, 2007	Mount Lemmon	Mount Lemmon Survey	·	1.8 km	MPC · JPL
712406	2014 TT_{62}	—	February 8, 2011	Mount Lemmon	Mount Lemmon Survey	EOS	1.5 km	MPC · JPL
712407	2014 TR_{63}	—	November 10, 2009	Mount Lemmon	Mount Lemmon Survey	·	1.9 km	MPC · JPL
712408	2014 TD_{65}	—	September 22, 2009	Mount Lemmon	Mount Lemmon Survey	·	1.6 km	MPC · JPL
712409	2014 TM_{65}	—	September 20, 2009	Kitt Peak	Spacewatch	·	1.9 km	MPC · JPL
712410	2014 TX_{65}	—	September 29, 2003	Needville	Needville	EMA	2.4 km	MPC · JPL
712411	2014 TC_{68}	—	November 16, 2006	Kitt Peak	Spacewatch	·	980 m	MPC · JPL
712412	2014 TC_{70}	—	May 12, 2012	Mount Lemmon	Mount Lemmon Survey	·	2.7 km	MPC · JPL
712413	2014 TN_{71}	—	September 20, 2014	Haleakala	Pan-STARRS 1	·	730 m	MPC · JPL
712414	2014 TU_{71}	—	September 20, 2014	Haleakala	Pan-STARRS 1	·	1.3 km	MPC · JPL
712415	2014 TM_{72}	—	March 11, 2008	Kitt Peak	Spacewatch	·	1.2 km	MPC · JPL
712416	2014 TU_{72}	—	February 5, 2011	Haleakala	Pan-STARRS 1	·	1.8 km	MPC · JPL
712417	2014 TB_{73}	—	December 27, 2006	Mount Lemmon	Mount Lemmon Survey	·	1.0 km	MPC · JPL
712418	2014 TZ_{74}	—	October 2, 2014	Mount Lemmon	Mount Lemmon Survey	·	610 m	MPC · JPL
712419	2014 TB_{77}	—	September 19, 2014	Haleakala	Pan-STARRS 1	·	800 m	MPC · JPL
712420	2014 TS_{78}	—	October 23, 2009	Mount Lemmon	Mount Lemmon Survey	EOS	1.5 km	MPC · JPL
712421	2014 TJ_{79}	—	February 1, 2009	Kitt Peak	Spacewatch	V	610 m	MPC · JPL
712422	2014 TZ_{82}	—	May 13, 2012	Mount Lemmon	Mount Lemmon Survey	·	2.3 km	MPC · JPL
712423	2014 TN_{83}	—	April 27, 2012	Haleakala	Pan-STARRS 1	EOS	1.5 km	MPC · JPL
712424	2014 TJ_{88}	—	October 1, 2014	Haleakala	Pan-STARRS 1	EOS	1.4 km	MPC · JPL
712425	2014 TG_{89}	—	October 22, 2008	Mount Lemmon	Mount Lemmon Survey	·	2.5 km	MPC · JPL
712426	2014 TM_{89}	—	February 27, 2012	Haleakala	Pan-STARRS 1	·	1.9 km	MPC · JPL
712427	2014 TX_{89}	—	January 27, 2011	Mount Lemmon	Mount Lemmon Survey	·	1.7 km	MPC · JPL
712428	2014 TY_{89}	—	October 2, 2014	Haleakala	Pan-STARRS 1	·	1.6 km	MPC · JPL
712429	2014 TJ_{90}	—	September 24, 2008	Catalina	CSS	HYG	2.6 km	MPC · JPL
712430	2014 TP_{90}	—	July 8, 2013	Haleakala	Pan-STARRS 1	VER	2.5 km	MPC · JPL
712431	2014 TW_{90}	—	October 27, 2009	Kitt Peak	Spacewatch	·	2.5 km	MPC · JPL
712432	2014 TB_{91}	—	October 14, 2014	Mount Lemmon	Mount Lemmon Survey	·	2.4 km	MPC · JPL
712433	2014 TC_{91}	—	September 30, 2014	Mount Lemmon	Mount Lemmon Survey	·	2.2 km	MPC · JPL
712434	2014 TE_{91}	—	April 13, 2012	Haleakala	Pan-STARRS 1	·	2.9 km	MPC · JPL
712435	2014 TN_{91}	—	August 23, 2003	Cerro Tololo	Deep Ecliptic Survey	·	2.6 km	MPC · JPL
712436	2014 TH_{92}	—	November 10, 2009	Kitt Peak	Spacewatch	·	2.2 km	MPC · JPL
712437	2014 TA_{93}	—	July 15, 2013	Haleakala	Pan-STARRS 1	·	2.4 km	MPC · JPL
712438	2014 TW_{93}	—	October 1, 2003	Kitt Peak	Spacewatch	·	1.9 km	MPC · JPL
712439	2014 TC_{94}	—	November 9, 2009	Kitt Peak	Spacewatch	·	3.2 km	MPC · JPL
712440	2014 TG_{98}	—	February 22, 2017	Mount Lemmon	Mount Lemmon Survey	·	2.9 km	MPC · JPL
712441	2014 TY_{102}	—	October 3, 2014	Mount Lemmon	Mount Lemmon Survey	·	2.1 km	MPC · JPL
712442	2014 TD_{103}	—	October 2, 2014	Haleakala	Pan-STARRS 1	·	2.4 km	MPC · JPL
712443	2014 TE_{103}	—	October 1, 2014	Haleakala	Pan-STARRS 1	·	2.4 km	MPC · JPL
712444	2014 TU_{103}	—	October 15, 2014	Kitt Peak	Spacewatch	·	2.0 km	MPC · JPL
712445	2014 TX_{103}	—	October 2, 2014	Haleakala	Pan-STARRS 1	·	2.5 km	MPC · JPL
712446	2014 TH_{105}	—	October 1, 2014	Haleakala	Pan-STARRS 1	V	430 m	MPC · JPL
712447	2014 TV_{106}	—	October 1, 2014	Haleakala	Pan-STARRS 1	·	670 m	MPC · JPL
712448	2014 TX_{106}	—	October 3, 2014	Mount Lemmon	Mount Lemmon Survey	·	2.2 km	MPC · JPL
712449	2014 TP_{107}	—	October 1, 2014	Haleakala	Pan-STARRS 1	VER	2.0 km	MPC · JPL
712450	2014 TP_{108}	—	October 1, 2014	Haleakala	Pan-STARRS 1	·	2.3 km	MPC · JPL
712451	2014 TL_{109}	—	October 1, 2014	Haleakala	Pan-STARRS 1	·	2.2 km	MPC · JPL
712452	2014 TW_{110}	—	October 1, 2014	Haleakala	Pan-STARRS 1	VER	2.0 km	MPC · JPL
712453	2014 TY_{110}	—	October 2, 2014	Mount Lemmon	Mount Lemmon Survey	EOS	1.5 km	MPC · JPL
712454	2014 TA_{111}	—	October 14, 2014	Mount Lemmon	Mount Lemmon Survey	·	2.2 km	MPC · JPL
712455	2014 TM_{117}	—	November 24, 2009	Mount Lemmon	Mount Lemmon Survey	·	1.9 km	MPC · JPL
712456	2014 TC_{119}	—	April 22, 2012	Mount Lemmon	Mount Lemmon Survey	URS	2.3 km	MPC · JPL
712457	2014 UJ	—	March 19, 2013	Palomar	Palomar Transient Factory	·	750 m	MPC · JPL
712458	2014 UK_{2}	—	October 15, 2009	Mount Lemmon	Mount Lemmon Survey	EOS	1.6 km	MPC · JPL
712459	2014 UH_{5}	—	October 16, 2014	Kitt Peak	Spacewatch	·	2.3 km	MPC · JPL
712460	2014 UD_{6}	—	October 17, 2014	Mount Lemmon	Mount Lemmon Survey	·	590 m	MPC · JPL
712461	2014 UJ_{7}	—	April 4, 2011	Mount Lemmon	Mount Lemmon Survey	·	2.1 km	MPC · JPL
712462	2014 UY_{8}	—	October 5, 2014	Kitt Peak	Spacewatch	EOS	1.8 km	MPC · JPL
712463	2014 UH_{9}	—	July 1, 2013	Haleakala	Pan-STARRS 1	·	2.4 km	MPC · JPL
712464	2014 UT_{11}	—	October 1, 2003	Kitt Peak	Spacewatch	·	2.1 km	MPC · JPL
712465	2014 UF_{13}	—	October 17, 2014	Kitt Peak	Spacewatch	·	2.7 km	MPC · JPL
712466	2014 UB_{14}	—	January 28, 2006	Mount Lemmon	Mount Lemmon Survey	EOS	1.6 km	MPC · JPL
712467	2014 UY_{14}	—	September 26, 2014	Mount Lemmon	Mount Lemmon Survey	·	2.5 km	MPC · JPL
712468	2014 UN_{15}	—	October 17, 2014	Mount Lemmon	Mount Lemmon Survey	·	2.4 km	MPC · JPL
712469	2014 UQ_{15}	—	October 3, 2014	Mount Lemmon	Mount Lemmon Survey	·	2.2 km	MPC · JPL
712470	2014 UW_{15}	—	October 3, 2014	Mount Lemmon	Mount Lemmon Survey	·	1.8 km	MPC · JPL
712471	2014 UA_{16}	—	July 14, 2013	Haleakala	Pan-STARRS 1	VER	2.0 km	MPC · JPL
712472	2014 UE_{16}	—	September 25, 2014	Kitt Peak	Spacewatch	·	630 m	MPC · JPL
712473	2014 UH_{16}	—	October 17, 2014	Mount Lemmon	Mount Lemmon Survey	EOS	1.4 km	MPC · JPL
712474	2014 UL_{16}	—	April 15, 2012	Haleakala	Pan-STARRS 1	EOS	1.7 km	MPC · JPL
712475	2014 UK_{17}	—	January 30, 2011	Piszkés-tető	K. Sárneczky, Z. Kuli	·	1.7 km	MPC · JPL
712476	2014 UY_{17}	—	September 28, 2001	Palomar	NEAT	·	620 m	MPC · JPL
712477	2014 UX_{18}	—	October 18, 2014	Kitt Peak	Spacewatch	·	2.0 km	MPC · JPL
712478	2014 UH_{19}	—	December 31, 2007	Kitt Peak	Spacewatch	·	720 m	MPC · JPL
712479	2014 UG_{20}	—	September 5, 2008	Kitt Peak	Spacewatch	·	2.3 km	MPC · JPL
712480	2014 UH_{21}	—	September 25, 2008	Kitt Peak	Spacewatch	·	2.4 km	MPC · JPL
712481	2014 UX_{24}	—	November 30, 2003	Kitt Peak	Spacewatch	·	2.4 km	MPC · JPL
712482	2014 UC_{25}	—	October 19, 2014	Kitt Peak	Spacewatch	·	3.6 km	MPC · JPL
712483	2014 UW_{25}	—	September 27, 2003	Kitt Peak	Spacewatch	TIR	1.9 km	MPC · JPL
712484	2014 UB_{28}	—	May 31, 2011	Mount Lemmon	Mount Lemmon Survey	T_{j} (2.94)	3.6 km	MPC · JPL
712485	2014 UC_{28}	—	October 8, 2008	Kitt Peak	Spacewatch	·	2.5 km	MPC · JPL
712486	2014 UR_{28}	—	May 21, 2012	Haleakala	Pan-STARRS 1	·	3.6 km	MPC · JPL
712487	2014 UK_{35}	—	September 10, 2007	Mount Lemmon	Mount Lemmon Survey	·	560 m	MPC · JPL
712488	2014 UT_{35}	—	September 5, 2008	Kitt Peak	Spacewatch	VER	2.1 km	MPC · JPL
712489	2014 UQ_{37}	—	January 4, 2006	Kitt Peak	Spacewatch	·	1.7 km	MPC · JPL
712490	2014 UG_{38}	—	March 2, 2011	Kitt Peak	Spacewatch	·	2.5 km	MPC · JPL
712491	2014 UL_{39}	—	October 18, 2014	Mount Lemmon	Mount Lemmon Survey	VER	2.5 km	MPC · JPL
712492	2014 UE_{40}	—	September 20, 2014	Haleakala	Pan-STARRS 1	·	920 m	MPC · JPL
712493	2014 UD_{43}	—	October 10, 2007	Kitt Peak	Spacewatch	·	750 m	MPC · JPL
712494	2014 UR_{43}	—	September 25, 2008	Mount Lemmon	Mount Lemmon Survey	·	2.0 km	MPC · JPL
712495	2014 UH_{45}	—	July 25, 2003	Palomar	NEAT	·	1.7 km	MPC · JPL
712496	2014 UR_{46}	—	October 21, 2014	Kitt Peak	Spacewatch	·	2.7 km	MPC · JPL
712497	2014 UQ_{47}	—	November 6, 2010	Mount Lemmon	Mount Lemmon Survey	·	870 m	MPC · JPL
712498	2014 UG_{48}	—	March 25, 2006	Kitt Peak	Spacewatch	·	860 m	MPC · JPL
712499 Alexstefanescu	2014 US_{48}	Alexstefanescu	September 22, 2014	La Palma	EURONEAR	·	2.1 km	MPC · JPL
712500	2014 UP_{51}	—	October 21, 2003	Kitt Peak	Spacewatch	·	2.8 km	MPC · JPL

== 712501–712600 ==
back to top

Designation			Discovery			Properties		Ref
Permanent	Provisional	Named after	Date	Site	Discoverer(s)	Category	Diam.	Ref
712501	2014 UK_{54}	—	August 31, 2014	Haleakala	Pan-STARRS 1	·	2.5 km	MPC · JPL
712502	2014 UL_{55}	—	October 23, 2014	Kitt Peak	Spacewatch	·	2.8 km	MPC · JPL
712503	2014 UD_{60}	—	August 24, 2008	Kitt Peak	Spacewatch	VER	2.2 km	MPC · JPL
712504	2014 UF_{60}	—	September 20, 2003	Kitt Peak	Spacewatch	·	2.2 km	MPC · JPL
712505	2014 UQ_{61}	—	January 30, 2011	Mount Lemmon	Mount Lemmon Survey	·	2.6 km	MPC · JPL
712506	2014 UA_{62}	—	August 13, 2010	Kitt Peak	Spacewatch	·	880 m	MPC · JPL
712507	2014 UG_{63}	—	September 19, 2014	Haleakala	Pan-STARRS 1	·	2.5 km	MPC · JPL
712508	2014 UX_{64}	—	June 18, 2013	Haleakala	Pan-STARRS 1	·	2.5 km	MPC · JPL
712509	2014 UA_{65}	—	November 17, 2009	Kitt Peak	Spacewatch	·	2.7 km	MPC · JPL
712510	2014 UB_{65}	—	October 1, 2014	Haleakala	Pan-STARRS 1	EOS	1.8 km	MPC · JPL
712511	2014 UE_{65}	—	September 22, 2003	Kitt Peak	Spacewatch	·	2.5 km	MPC · JPL
712512	2014 UG_{67}	—	October 4, 2007	Kitt Peak	Spacewatch	·	900 m	MPC · JPL
712513	2014 UM_{69}	—	October 13, 2014	Mount Lemmon	Mount Lemmon Survey	·	1.7 km	MPC · JPL
712514	2014 UB_{73}	—	September 12, 2002	Palomar	NEAT	THM	1.9 km	MPC · JPL
712515	2014 UW_{75}	—	October 17, 2003	Kitt Peak	Spacewatch	THM	1.7 km	MPC · JPL
712516	2014 UM_{79}	—	November 19, 2009	Kitt Peak	Spacewatch	·	2.0 km	MPC · JPL
712517	2014 UQ_{79}	—	April 1, 2012	Mount Lemmon	Mount Lemmon Survey	·	2.2 km	MPC · JPL
712518	2014 UZ_{79}	—	October 5, 2014	Kitt Peak	Spacewatch	·	910 m	MPC · JPL
712519	2014 UW_{83}	—	October 21, 2014	Mount Lemmon	Mount Lemmon Survey	·	2.4 km	MPC · JPL
712520	2014 UH_{84}	—	October 20, 2003	Kitt Peak	Spacewatch	THM	1.9 km	MPC · JPL
712521	2014 UJ_{84}	—	October 3, 2014	Mount Lemmon	Mount Lemmon Survey	·	1.8 km	MPC · JPL
712522	2014 UZ_{85}	—	October 21, 2014	Mount Lemmon	Mount Lemmon Survey	·	2.3 km	MPC · JPL
712523	2014 UG_{89}	—	October 24, 2009	Kitt Peak	Spacewatch	·	1.8 km	MPC · JPL
712524	2014 UZ_{91}	—	October 11, 2007	Mount Lemmon	Mount Lemmon Survey	·	670 m	MPC · JPL
712525	2014 UQ_{93}	—	October 22, 2014	Mount Lemmon	Mount Lemmon Survey	·	450 m	MPC · JPL
712526	2014 UW_{95}	—	April 15, 2012	Haleakala	Pan-STARRS 1	·	2.6 km	MPC · JPL
712527	2014 UG_{99}	—	May 9, 2007	Lulin	LUSS	·	3.2 km	MPC · JPL
712528	2014 UV_{100}	—	August 27, 2005	Palomar	NEAT	3:2	4.2 km	MPC · JPL
712529	2014 UD_{103}	—	September 19, 2003	Kitt Peak	Spacewatch	THM	2.2 km	MPC · JPL
712530	2014 UE_{103}	—	November 21, 2003	Kitt Peak	Spacewatch	·	3.0 km	MPC · JPL
712531	2014 UV_{105}	—	September 21, 2007	Kitt Peak	Spacewatch	·	740 m	MPC · JPL
712532	2014 UG_{110}	—	October 7, 2005	Mount Lemmon	Mount Lemmon Survey	·	1.8 km	MPC · JPL
712533	2014 UA_{112}	—	October 25, 2014	Mount Lemmon	Mount Lemmon Survey	·	2.2 km	MPC · JPL
712534	2014 UW_{115}	—	September 28, 2000	Kitt Peak	Spacewatch	·	650 m	MPC · JPL
712535	2014 UQ_{116}	—	October 7, 2014	Haleakala	Pan-STARRS 1	H	470 m	MPC · JPL
712536	2014 UT_{119}	—	September 5, 2008	Kitt Peak	Spacewatch	·	2.2 km	MPC · JPL
712537	2014 UY_{119}	—	September 27, 2009	Kitt Peak	Spacewatch	·	1.4 km	MPC · JPL
712538	2014 UT_{122}	—	March 6, 2011	Mount Lemmon	Mount Lemmon Survey	EOS	1.5 km	MPC · JPL
712539	2014 UG_{124}	—	November 21, 2009	Kitt Peak	Spacewatch	·	2.5 km	MPC · JPL
712540	2014 UA_{125}	—	September 25, 2005	Kitt Peak	Spacewatch	·	1.9 km	MPC · JPL
712541	2014 UV_{126}	—	August 20, 2006	Palomar	NEAT	NYS	1.1 km	MPC · JPL
712542	2014 UO_{127}	—	August 7, 2008	Kitt Peak	Spacewatch	·	2.2 km	MPC · JPL
712543	2014 UO_{128}	—	April 16, 2007	Mount Lemmon	Mount Lemmon Survey	·	1.9 km	MPC · JPL
712544	2014 UN_{129}	—	January 27, 2011	Mount Lemmon	Mount Lemmon Survey	·	1.5 km	MPC · JPL
712545	2014 UM_{132}	—	December 19, 2003	Socorro	LINEAR	·	3.2 km	MPC · JPL
712546	2014 UG_{133}	—	October 17, 2003	Kitt Peak	Spacewatch	EOS	1.5 km	MPC · JPL
712547	2014 UC_{134}	—	October 24, 2014	Kitt Peak	Spacewatch	HYG	2.0 km	MPC · JPL
712548	2014 UG_{136}	—	October 16, 2014	Kitt Peak	Spacewatch	·	3.2 km	MPC · JPL
712549	2014 UG_{137}	—	October 24, 2014	Kitt Peak	Spacewatch	·	2.2 km	MPC · JPL
712550	2014 UU_{137}	—	October 29, 2009	Kitt Peak	Spacewatch	EOS	1.6 km	MPC · JPL
712551	2014 UL_{138}	—	September 5, 2008	Kitt Peak	Spacewatch	VER	2.3 km	MPC · JPL
712552	2014 UX_{143}	—	February 1, 2005	Kitt Peak	Spacewatch	·	2.3 km	MPC · JPL
712553	2014 UA_{144}	—	October 20, 2008	Mount Lemmon	Mount Lemmon Survey	·	2.7 km	MPC · JPL
712554	2014 UY_{144}	—	September 26, 2014	Kitt Peak	Spacewatch	·	600 m	MPC · JPL
712555	2014 UP_{145}	—	September 30, 2014	Kitt Peak	Spacewatch	·	2.3 km	MPC · JPL
712556	2014 UR_{147}	—	April 29, 2003	Kitt Peak	Spacewatch	·	610 m	MPC · JPL
712557	2014 UN_{148}	—	November 30, 2003	Kitt Peak	Spacewatch	·	1.9 km	MPC · JPL
712558	2014 UJ_{149}	—	October 25, 2014	Kitt Peak	Spacewatch	EOS	1.6 km	MPC · JPL
712559	2014 UP_{150}	—	April 27, 2012	Haleakala	Pan-STARRS 1	·	2.4 km	MPC · JPL
712560	2014 UN_{152}	—	December 11, 2009	Mount Lemmon	Mount Lemmon Survey	·	1.9 km	MPC · JPL
712561	2014 UM_{157}	—	May 12, 2012	Mount Lemmon	Mount Lemmon Survey	·	2.4 km	MPC · JPL
712562	2014 UC_{158}	—	October 25, 2014	Haleakala	Pan-STARRS 1	·	630 m	MPC · JPL
712563	2014 UN_{158}	—	October 25, 2014	Haleakala	Pan-STARRS 1	·	2.7 km	MPC · JPL
712564	2014 UZ_{158}	—	April 25, 2008	Kitt Peak	Spacewatch	·	3.0 km	MPC · JPL
712565	2014 US_{160}	—	October 25, 2014	Haleakala	Pan-STARRS 1	·	2.5 km	MPC · JPL
712566	2014 UV_{161}	—	May 4, 2006	Mount Lemmon	Mount Lemmon Survey	(31811)	2.9 km	MPC · JPL
712567	2014 UZ_{161}	—	December 4, 2007	Kitt Peak	Spacewatch	MAS	530 m	MPC · JPL
712568	2014 UX_{164}	—	December 30, 2007	Kitt Peak	Spacewatch	·	750 m	MPC · JPL
712569	2014 UB_{166}	—	November 11, 2009	Kitt Peak	Spacewatch	TEL	1.1 km	MPC · JPL
712570	2014 UK_{168}	—	October 26, 2014	Mount Lemmon	Mount Lemmon Survey	·	2.3 km	MPC · JPL
712571	2014 UQ_{168}	—	January 30, 2011	Mount Lemmon	Mount Lemmon Survey	TEL	1.2 km	MPC · JPL
712572	2014 UT_{168}	—	June 10, 2012	Mount Lemmon	Mount Lemmon Survey	·	3.3 km	MPC · JPL
712573	2014 UV_{169}	—	October 26, 2014	Haleakala	Pan-STARRS 1	·	2.4 km	MPC · JPL
712574	2014 UV_{170}	—	July 4, 2013	Haleakala	Pan-STARRS 1	·	3.3 km	MPC · JPL
712575	2014 UF_{171}	—	January 8, 2010	Mount Lemmon	Mount Lemmon Survey	·	2.1 km	MPC · JPL
712576	2014 UM_{171}	—	September 20, 2014	Haleakala	Pan-STARRS 1	·	2.4 km	MPC · JPL
712577	2014 UE_{172}	—	April 27, 2012	Haleakala	Pan-STARRS 1	·	3.1 km	MPC · JPL
712578	2014 UH_{173}	—	February 13, 2011	Mount Lemmon	Mount Lemmon Survey	EOS	1.6 km	MPC · JPL
712579	2014 UE_{177}	—	October 25, 2014	Mount Lemmon	Mount Lemmon Survey	·	2.6 km	MPC · JPL
712580	2014 UN_{178}	—	September 26, 2014	Kitt Peak	Spacewatch	VER	2.3 km	MPC · JPL
712581	2014 UP_{180}	—	September 20, 2014	Haleakala	Pan-STARRS 1	·	2.5 km	MPC · JPL
712582	2014 UX_{183}	—	October 16, 2003	Kitt Peak	Spacewatch	·	1.8 km	MPC · JPL
712583	2014 UP_{184}	—	September 5, 2008	Kitt Peak	Spacewatch	·	2.6 km	MPC · JPL
712584	2014 UJ_{185}	—	September 6, 2014	Mount Lemmon	Mount Lemmon Survey	·	2.6 km	MPC · JPL
712585	2014 UE_{190}	—	December 14, 2004	Kitt Peak	Spacewatch	EOS	1.6 km	MPC · JPL
712586	2014 UF_{199}	—	September 15, 2004	Kitt Peak	Spacewatch	·	1.9 km	MPC · JPL
712587	2014 UJ_{200}	—	August 31, 2014	Haleakala	Pan-STARRS 1	·	2.3 km	MPC · JPL
712588	2014 UN_{200}	—	July 2, 2013	Haleakala	Pan-STARRS 1	·	2.8 km	MPC · JPL
712589	2014 UR_{200}	—	October 17, 2003	Kitt Peak	Spacewatch	EMA	2.1 km	MPC · JPL
712590	2014 UC_{201}	—	November 24, 2009	Kitt Peak	Spacewatch	·	1.9 km	MPC · JPL
712591	2014 UR_{201}	—	September 18, 2014	Haleakala	Pan-STARRS 1	LIX	3.5 km	MPC · JPL
712592	2014 UG_{211}	—	November 16, 2009	Kitt Peak	Spacewatch	·	2.5 km	MPC · JPL
712593	2014 UL_{213}	—	August 30, 2014	Haleakala	Pan-STARRS 1	·	2.7 km	MPC · JPL
712594	2014 UM_{220}	—	September 18, 2003	Kitt Peak	Spacewatch	·	2.9 km	MPC · JPL
712595	2014 UM_{226}	—	October 21, 2014	Kitt Peak	Spacewatch	HYG	1.8 km	MPC · JPL
712596	2014 UN_{227}	—	October 31, 2014	Haleakala	Pan-STARRS 1	·	3.2 km	MPC · JPL
712597	2014 UZ_{230}	—	September 28, 2008	Mount Lemmon	Mount Lemmon Survey	·	2.1 km	MPC · JPL
712598	2014 UF_{231}	—	October 28, 2014	Haleakala	Pan-STARRS 1	·	2.9 km	MPC · JPL
712599	2014 UJ_{231}	—	October 31, 2014	Mount Lemmon	Mount Lemmon Survey	EOS	1.3 km	MPC · JPL
712600	2014 UW_{231}	—	October 26, 2014	Mount Lemmon	Mount Lemmon Survey	·	1.8 km	MPC · JPL

== 712601–712700 ==
back to top

Designation			Discovery			Properties		Ref
Permanent	Provisional	Named after	Date	Site	Discoverer(s)	Category	Diam.	Ref
712601	2014 UR_{232}	—	July 14, 2013	Haleakala	Pan-STARRS 1	EOS	1.6 km	MPC · JPL
712602	2014 UT_{232}	—	October 30, 2014	Haleakala	Pan-STARRS 1	·	2.3 km	MPC · JPL
712603	2014 UW_{232}	—	October 21, 2014	Kitt Peak	Spacewatch	TIR	3.1 km	MPC · JPL
712604	2014 UO_{233}	—	October 16, 2014	Kitt Peak	Spacewatch	·	2.5 km	MPC · JPL
712605	2014 UM_{235}	—	October 25, 2014	Mount Lemmon	Mount Lemmon Survey	·	1.7 km	MPC · JPL
712606	2014 UF_{237}	—	December 3, 2004	Kitt Peak	Spacewatch	EOS	1.8 km	MPC · JPL
712607	2014 UH_{237}	—	August 20, 2014	Haleakala	Pan-STARRS 1	·	2.5 km	MPC · JPL
712608	2014 UW_{237}	—	October 28, 2014	Haleakala	Pan-STARRS 1	EOS	1.7 km	MPC · JPL
712609	2014 US_{238}	—	September 21, 2008	Kitt Peak	Spacewatch	·	2.3 km	MPC · JPL
712610	2014 UP_{239}	—	October 29, 2014	Haleakala	Pan-STARRS 1	·	2.7 km	MPC · JPL
712611	2014 UW_{240}	—	June 14, 2012	Mount Lemmon	Mount Lemmon Survey	VER	2.5 km	MPC · JPL
712612	2014 UQ_{247}	—	September 22, 2003	Kitt Peak	Spacewatch	·	1.7 km	MPC · JPL
712613	2014 UG_{255}	—	October 28, 2014	Haleakala	Pan-STARRS 1	EOS	1.4 km	MPC · JPL
712614	2014 UU_{255}	—	October 28, 2014	Haleakala	Pan-STARRS 1	·	3.4 km	MPC · JPL
712615	2014 UZ_{257}	—	October 28, 2014	Haleakala	Pan-STARRS 1	L5	8.7 km	MPC · JPL
712616	2014 UK_{258}	—	September 26, 2003	Apache Point	SDSS Collaboration	V	500 m	MPC · JPL
712617	2014 UC_{262}	—	October 22, 2014	Mount Lemmon	Mount Lemmon Survey	·	2.5 km	MPC · JPL
712618	2014 UJ_{269}	—	October 28, 2014	Haleakala	Pan-STARRS 1	·	2.1 km	MPC · JPL
712619	2014 UU_{273}	—	October 25, 2014	Mount Lemmon	Mount Lemmon Survey	·	1.1 km	MPC · JPL
712620	2014 UU_{282}	—	April 21, 2006	Kitt Peak	Spacewatch	·	2.4 km	MPC · JPL
712621	2014 UR_{283}	—	February 28, 2008	Mount Lemmon	Mount Lemmon Survey	·	920 m	MPC · JPL
712622	2014 UT_{284}	—	October 29, 2014	Haleakala	Pan-STARRS 1	·	1.2 km	MPC · JPL
712623	2014 UR_{287}	—	October 28, 2014	Haleakala	Pan-STARRS 1	L5	7.2 km	MPC · JPL
712624	2014 VD_{3}	—	June 7, 2013	Haleakala	Pan-STARRS 1	·	2.4 km	MPC · JPL
712625	2014 VG_{3}	—	October 3, 2014	Mount Lemmon	Mount Lemmon Survey	·	640 m	MPC · JPL
712626	2014 VJ_{3}	—	December 22, 2008	Mount Lemmon	Mount Lemmon Survey	·	800 m	MPC · JPL
712627	2014 VE_{4}	—	November 9, 2009	Kitt Peak	Spacewatch	·	2.2 km	MPC · JPL
712628	2014 VU_{7}	—	September 30, 2003	Kitt Peak	Spacewatch	·	810 m	MPC · JPL
712629	2014 VY_{7}	—	November 12, 2014	Haleakala	Pan-STARRS 1	H	420 m	MPC · JPL
712630	2014 VA_{8}	—	January 15, 2008	Mount Lemmon	Mount Lemmon Survey	MAS	570 m	MPC · JPL
712631	2014 VV_{8}	—	November 19, 2003	Kitt Peak	Spacewatch	EOS	1.5 km	MPC · JPL
712632	2014 VP_{10}	—	October 7, 2014	Haleakala	Pan-STARRS 1	·	1.8 km	MPC · JPL
712633	2014 VK_{11}	—	October 18, 2009	Mount Lemmon	Mount Lemmon Survey	·	2.3 km	MPC · JPL
712634	2014 VA_{14}	—	December 19, 2009	Mount Lemmon	Mount Lemmon Survey	·	2.6 km	MPC · JPL
712635	2014 VD_{16}	—	November 14, 2014	Kitt Peak	Spacewatch	·	3.1 km	MPC · JPL
712636	2014 VH_{17}	—	October 22, 2003	Apache Point	SDSS	·	2.5 km	MPC · JPL
712637	2014 VE_{18}	—	November 12, 2014	Cerro Paranal	Altmann, M., Prusti, T.	·	2.2 km	MPC · JPL
712638	2014 VS_{23}	—	February 5, 2011	Mount Lemmon	Mount Lemmon Survey	·	2.2 km	MPC · JPL
712639	2014 VT_{23}	—	March 30, 2011	Kitt Peak	Spacewatch	·	2.7 km	MPC · JPL
712640	2014 VW_{24}	—	February 5, 2011	Mount Lemmon	Mount Lemmon Survey	·	2.2 km	MPC · JPL
712641	2014 VH_{26}	—	November 12, 2014	Haleakala	Pan-STARRS 1	L5	8.8 km	MPC · JPL
712642	2014 VJ_{27}	—	February 10, 2008	Kitt Peak	Spacewatch	·	990 m	MPC · JPL
712643	2014 VE_{28}	—	January 10, 2008	Kitt Peak	Spacewatch	MAS	530 m	MPC · JPL
712644	2014 VM_{28}	—	October 8, 2008	Mount Lemmon	Mount Lemmon Survey	·	2.6 km	MPC · JPL
712645	2014 VS_{28}	—	November 20, 2003	Kitt Peak	Deep Ecliptic Survey	EOS	1.5 km	MPC · JPL
712646	2014 VX_{28}	—	October 28, 2014	Kitt Peak	Spacewatch	·	2.5 km	MPC · JPL
712647	2014 VW_{29}	—	November 14, 2014	Kitt Peak	Spacewatch	·	2.9 km	MPC · JPL
712648	2014 VB_{30}	—	July 9, 2013	Haleakala	Pan-STARRS 1	·	2.2 km	MPC · JPL
712649	2014 VG_{30}	—	October 19, 2014	Kitt Peak	Spacewatch	·	710 m	MPC · JPL
712650	2014 VQ_{30}	—	July 14, 2013	Haleakala	Pan-STARRS 1	KOR	1.0 km	MPC · JPL
712651	2014 VY_{30}	—	April 13, 2010	WISE	WISE	·	2.9 km	MPC · JPL
712652	2014 VY_{31}	—	November 14, 2014	Kitt Peak	Spacewatch	·	2.8 km	MPC · JPL
712653	2014 VK_{32}	—	March 9, 2011	Mount Lemmon	Mount Lemmon Survey	·	2.5 km	MPC · JPL
712654	2014 VB_{33}	—	November 15, 2003	Kitt Peak	Spacewatch	EOS	1.9 km	MPC · JPL
712655	2014 VD_{33}	—	September 25, 2014	Mount Lemmon	Mount Lemmon Survey	·	1.6 km	MPC · JPL
712656	2014 VH_{33}	—	November 10, 2010	Mount Lemmon	Mount Lemmon Survey	·	1.3 km	MPC · JPL
712657	2014 VG_{34}	—	October 29, 2014	Kitt Peak	Spacewatch	THM	1.7 km	MPC · JPL
712658	2014 VP_{38}	—	November 13, 2014	Kitt Peak	Spacewatch	·	3.4 km	MPC · JPL
712659	2014 VS_{39}	—	November 1, 2014	Mount Lemmon	Mount Lemmon Survey	·	2.6 km	MPC · JPL
712660	2014 VD_{41}	—	January 15, 2016	Mount Lemmon	Mount Lemmon Survey	ELF	3.1 km	MPC · JPL
712661	2014 VJ_{42}	—	November 15, 2014	Mount Lemmon	Mount Lemmon Survey	·	2.1 km	MPC · JPL
712662	2014 VL_{44}	—	November 1, 2014	Mount Lemmon	Mount Lemmon Survey	·	2.3 km	MPC · JPL
712663	2014 WC_{4}	—	October 24, 2008	Kitt Peak	Spacewatch	·	3.3 km	MPC · JPL
712664	2014 WH_{8}	—	March 15, 2012	Mount Lemmon	Mount Lemmon Survey	EOS	2.2 km	MPC · JPL
712665	2014 WF_{15}	—	October 29, 2014	Kitt Peak	Spacewatch	·	1.9 km	MPC · JPL
712666	2014 WD_{18}	—	November 16, 2014	Mount Lemmon	Mount Lemmon Survey	SYL	3.4 km	MPC · JPL
712667	2014 WE_{18}	—	November 16, 2014	Mount Lemmon	Mount Lemmon Survey	·	760 m	MPC · JPL
712668	2014 WK_{19}	—	October 25, 2003	Kitt Peak	Spacewatch	·	2.6 km	MPC · JPL
712669	2014 WC_{20}	—	February 5, 2011	Haleakala	Pan-STARRS 1	·	2.3 km	MPC · JPL
712670	2014 WE_{20}	—	October 9, 2008	Mount Lemmon	Mount Lemmon Survey	·	2.4 km	MPC · JPL
712671	2014 WG_{20}	—	November 11, 2009	Mount Lemmon	Mount Lemmon Survey	·	2.0 km	MPC · JPL
712672	2014 WS_{21}	—	October 12, 2009	Mount Lemmon	Mount Lemmon Survey	EOS	1.6 km	MPC · JPL
712673	2014 WZ_{21}	—	August 15, 2013	Haleakala	Pan-STARRS 1	·	1.5 km	MPC · JPL
712674	2014 WC_{24}	—	October 26, 2014	Mount Lemmon	Mount Lemmon Survey	(2076)	580 m	MPC · JPL
712675	2014 WU_{25}	—	October 24, 2008	Kitt Peak	Spacewatch	ELF	2.9 km	MPC · JPL
712676	2014 WM_{27}	—	October 22, 2014	Mount Lemmon	Mount Lemmon Survey	VER	2.6 km	MPC · JPL
712677	2014 WW_{28}	—	November 17, 2014	Mount Lemmon	Mount Lemmon Survey	·	1.7 km	MPC · JPL
712678	2014 WM_{29}	—	June 21, 2012	Mount Lemmon	Mount Lemmon Survey	L5	8.9 km	MPC · JPL
712679	2014 WM_{31}	—	October 12, 2014	Mount Lemmon	Mount Lemmon Survey	H	410 m	MPC · JPL
712680	2014 WZ_{31}	—	February 10, 2011	Mount Lemmon	Mount Lemmon Survey	·	2.2 km	MPC · JPL
712681	2014 WP_{32}	—	October 22, 2014	Catalina	CSS	EOS	1.9 km	MPC · JPL
712682	2014 WD_{33}	—	October 3, 2008	Mount Lemmon	Mount Lemmon Survey	·	2.6 km	MPC · JPL
712683	2014 WM_{33}	—	October 28, 2014	Haleakala	Pan-STARRS 1	·	460 m	MPC · JPL
712684	2014 WH_{34}	—	November 17, 2014	Haleakala	Pan-STARRS 1	PHO	880 m	MPC · JPL
712685	2014 WA_{35}	—	November 18, 2009	Mount Lemmon	Mount Lemmon Survey	·	2.7 km	MPC · JPL
712686	2014 WQ_{35}	—	July 7, 2013	Kitt Peak	Spacewatch	·	3.3 km	MPC · JPL
712687	2014 WX_{35}	—	September 11, 2010	Mount Lemmon	Mount Lemmon Survey	·	830 m	MPC · JPL
712688	2014 WG_{37}	—	October 27, 2003	Kitt Peak	Spacewatch	·	2.4 km	MPC · JPL
712689	2014 WA_{38}	—	November 17, 2014	Haleakala	Pan-STARRS 1	·	1.4 km	MPC · JPL
712690	2014 WM_{38}	—	December 30, 2007	Kitt Peak	Spacewatch	·	930 m	MPC · JPL
712691	2014 WK_{39}	—	November 17, 2014	Haleakala	Pan-STARRS 1	·	560 m	MPC · JPL
712692	2014 WY_{40}	—	October 9, 2007	Kitt Peak	Spacewatch	·	580 m	MPC · JPL
712693	2014 WC_{41}	—	September 19, 2003	Kitt Peak	Spacewatch	·	2.4 km	MPC · JPL
712694	2014 WG_{43}	—	October 26, 2014	Mount Lemmon	Mount Lemmon Survey	·	1.7 km	MPC · JPL
712695	2014 WD_{45}	—	October 23, 2009	Mount Lemmon	Mount Lemmon Survey	KOR	1.0 km	MPC · JPL
712696	2014 WE_{47}	—	October 20, 2014	Kitt Peak	Spacewatch	·	1.5 km	MPC · JPL
712697	2014 WT_{48}	—	September 23, 2008	Kitt Peak	Spacewatch	·	2.2 km	MPC · JPL
712698	2014 WH_{51}	—	October 16, 2007	Mount Lemmon	Mount Lemmon Survey	·	790 m	MPC · JPL
712699	2014 WR_{51}	—	November 17, 2014	Haleakala	Pan-STARRS 1	VER	2.5 km	MPC · JPL
712700	2014 WO_{59}	—	November 17, 2014	Haleakala	Pan-STARRS 1	·	2.8 km	MPC · JPL

== 712701–712800 ==
back to top

Designation			Discovery			Properties		Ref
Permanent	Provisional	Named after	Date	Site	Discoverer(s)	Category	Diam.	Ref
712701	2014 WA_{60}	—	October 7, 2008	Mount Lemmon	Mount Lemmon Survey	·	2.3 km	MPC · JPL
712702	2014 WQ_{61}	—	September 22, 2003	Kitt Peak	Spacewatch	·	2.2 km	MPC · JPL
712703	2014 WD_{62}	—	September 19, 1998	Apache Point	SDSS Collaboration	·	1.7 km	MPC · JPL
712704	2014 WH_{63}	—	August 10, 2010	XuYi	PMO NEO Survey Program	·	890 m	MPC · JPL
712705	2014 WJ_{64}	—	March 15, 2007	Kitt Peak	Spacewatch	·	1.9 km	MPC · JPL
712706	2014 WR_{64}	—	January 19, 2012	Kitt Peak	Spacewatch	·	790 m	MPC · JPL
712707	2014 WT_{64}	—	October 25, 2014	Haleakala	Pan-STARRS 1	EOS	1.4 km	MPC · JPL
712708	2014 WV_{66}	—	October 2, 2014	Mount Lemmon	Mount Lemmon Survey	·	3.0 km	MPC · JPL
712709	2014 WD_{68}	—	August 8, 2010	Dauban	C. Rinner, Kugel, F.	V	520 m	MPC · JPL
712710	2014 WK_{69}	—	November 18, 2014	Haleakala	Pan-STARRS 1	·	2.3 km	MPC · JPL
712711	2014 WZ_{71}	—	November 18, 2007	Mount Lemmon	Mount Lemmon Survey	·	710 m	MPC · JPL
712712	2014 WO_{73}	—	November 17, 2014	Kitt Peak	Spacewatch	·	2.5 km	MPC · JPL
712713	2014 WC_{75}	—	November 17, 2014	Mount Lemmon	Mount Lemmon Survey	·	2.0 km	MPC · JPL
712714	2014 WF_{76}	—	December 15, 2009	Mount Lemmon	Mount Lemmon Survey	THM	1.9 km	MPC · JPL
712715	2014 WK_{76}	—	November 30, 2003	Kitt Peak	Spacewatch	·	2.5 km	MPC · JPL
712716	2014 WP_{80}	—	November 24, 2003	Kitt Peak	Spacewatch	·	2.8 km	MPC · JPL
712717	2014 WQ_{80}	—	November 17, 2014	Mount Lemmon	Mount Lemmon Survey	·	1.8 km	MPC · JPL
712718	2014 WC_{83}	—	October 25, 2014	Haleakala	Pan-STARRS 1	·	2.4 km	MPC · JPL
712719	2014 WH_{84}	—	October 18, 2014	Kitt Peak	Spacewatch	·	900 m	MPC · JPL
712720	2014 WL_{84}	—	October 9, 2007	Mount Lemmon	Mount Lemmon Survey	·	660 m	MPC · JPL
712721	2014 WL_{86}	—	November 17, 2014	Mount Lemmon	Mount Lemmon Survey	·	2.4 km	MPC · JPL
712722	2014 WY_{86}	—	October 21, 2003	Kitt Peak	Spacewatch	EOS	1.7 km	MPC · JPL
712723	2014 WU_{87}	—	April 15, 2012	Haleakala	Pan-STARRS 1	EOS	1.5 km	MPC · JPL
712724	2014 WK_{90}	—	April 27, 2012	Haleakala	Pan-STARRS 1	·	2.1 km	MPC · JPL
712725	2014 WP_{90}	—	October 18, 2014	Kitt Peak	Spacewatch	·	2.3 km	MPC · JPL
712726	2014 WL_{92}	—	November 17, 2014	Mount Lemmon	Mount Lemmon Survey	·	720 m	MPC · JPL
712727	2014 WX_{93}	—	September 20, 2014	Haleakala	Pan-STARRS 1	·	2.3 km	MPC · JPL
712728	2014 WE_{95}	—	November 16, 2009	Mount Lemmon	Mount Lemmon Survey	·	1.6 km	MPC · JPL
712729	2014 WO_{97}	—	September 22, 2008	Kitt Peak	Spacewatch	·	2.2 km	MPC · JPL
712730	2014 WW_{97}	—	January 27, 2011	Mount Lemmon	Mount Lemmon Survey	·	2.4 km	MPC · JPL
712731	2014 WQ_{100}	—	January 16, 2005	Mauna Kea	Veillet, C.	·	1.9 km	MPC · JPL
712732	2014 WQ_{101}	—	November 17, 2014	Mount Lemmon	Mount Lemmon Survey	VER	2.4 km	MPC · JPL
712733	2014 WN_{102}	—	October 16, 2014	Mount Lemmon	Mount Lemmon Survey	EOS	1.5 km	MPC · JPL
712734	2014 WO_{104}	—	November 2, 2007	Mount Lemmon	Mount Lemmon Survey	·	600 m	MPC · JPL
712735	2014 WS_{105}	—	October 2, 2014	Haleakala	Pan-STARRS 1	EOS	1.5 km	MPC · JPL
712736	2014 WR_{107}	—	October 3, 2014	Kitt Peak	Spacewatch	·	1.9 km	MPC · JPL
712737	2014 WH_{110}	—	November 18, 2014	Haleakala	Pan-STARRS 1	·	880 m	MPC · JPL
712738	2014 WC_{111}	—	April 17, 2012	Charleston	R. Holmes	EOS	1.9 km	MPC · JPL
712739	2014 WA_{113}	—	September 27, 2014	Mount Lemmon	Mount Lemmon Survey	·	3.1 km	MPC · JPL
712740	2014 WS_{113}	—	December 21, 2006	Mount Lemmon	Mount Lemmon Survey	·	2.1 km	MPC · JPL
712741	2014 WW_{114}	—	July 14, 2013	Haleakala	Pan-STARRS 1	·	1.9 km	MPC · JPL
712742	2014 WE_{116}	—	September 19, 2014	Haleakala	Pan-STARRS 1	·	2.5 km	MPC · JPL
712743	2014 WP_{117}	—	September 26, 2008	Bergisch Gladbach	W. Bickel	·	3.1 km	MPC · JPL
712744	2014 WF_{119}	—	November 20, 2014	Mount Lemmon	Mount Lemmon Survey	·	2.5 km	MPC · JPL
712745	2014 WQ_{119}	—	September 3, 2003	Črni Vrh	Skvarč, J.	·	640 m	MPC · JPL
712746	2014 WS_{121}	—	November 16, 2014	Mount Lemmon	Mount Lemmon Survey	·	1.9 km	MPC · JPL
712747	2014 WB_{124}	—	October 22, 2003	Kitt Peak	Spacewatch	MAS	590 m	MPC · JPL
712748	2014 WL_{125}	—	October 24, 2003	Kitt Peak	Spacewatch	·	2.6 km	MPC · JPL
712749	2014 WU_{126}	—	October 9, 2007	Kitt Peak	Spacewatch	·	650 m	MPC · JPL
712750	2014 WO_{127}	—	October 22, 2008	Kitt Peak	Spacewatch	·	2.6 km	MPC · JPL
712751	2014 WQ_{130}	—	November 17, 2014	Haleakala	Pan-STARRS 1	·	640 m	MPC · JPL
712752	2014 WV_{131}	—	November 17, 2014	Haleakala	Pan-STARRS 1	·	2.2 km	MPC · JPL
712753	2014 WW_{132}	—	January 16, 2011	Mount Lemmon	Mount Lemmon Survey	·	2.8 km	MPC · JPL
712754	2014 WN_{134}	—	November 17, 2014	Haleakala	Pan-STARRS 1	·	2.2 km	MPC · JPL
712755	2014 WG_{135}	—	October 26, 2008	Mount Lemmon	Mount Lemmon Survey	·	2.4 km	MPC · JPL
712756	2014 WS_{135}	—	October 8, 2008	Mount Lemmon	Mount Lemmon Survey	·	2.5 km	MPC · JPL
712757	2014 WQ_{136}	—	November 17, 2014	Haleakala	Pan-STARRS 1	·	2.1 km	MPC · JPL
712758	2014 WJ_{137}	—	November 17, 2014	Haleakala	Pan-STARRS 1	·	1.4 km	MPC · JPL
712759	2014 WM_{137}	—	January 29, 2011	Mount Lemmon	Mount Lemmon Survey	PAD	1.0 km	MPC · JPL
712760	2014 WF_{142}	—	September 20, 2003	Kitt Peak	Spacewatch	V	450 m	MPC · JPL
712761	2014 WY_{145}	—	October 31, 2014	Mount Lemmon	Mount Lemmon Survey	·	2.2 km	MPC · JPL
712762	2014 WM_{146}	—	October 2, 2014	Haleakala	Pan-STARRS 1	VER	2.3 km	MPC · JPL
712763	2014 WB_{148}	—	May 15, 2012	Haleakala	Pan-STARRS 1	EOS	1.6 km	MPC · JPL
712764	2014 WP_{148}	—	August 31, 2014	Haleakala	Pan-STARRS 1	·	2.1 km	MPC · JPL
712765	2014 WN_{150}	—	August 31, 2014	Haleakala	Pan-STARRS 1	·	1.6 km	MPC · JPL
712766	2014 WU_{150}	—	October 13, 2014	Mount Lemmon	Mount Lemmon Survey	·	830 m	MPC · JPL
712767	2014 WK_{151}	—	August 31, 2014	Haleakala	Pan-STARRS 1	VER	2.2 km	MPC · JPL
712768	2014 WF_{152}	—	November 17, 2014	Haleakala	Pan-STARRS 1	·	650 m	MPC · JPL
712769	2014 WG_{152}	—	November 17, 2014	Haleakala	Pan-STARRS 1	·	2.5 km	MPC · JPL
712770	2014 WT_{153}	—	October 15, 2007	Mount Lemmon	Mount Lemmon Survey	·	560 m	MPC · JPL
712771	2014 WL_{154}	—	November 20, 2003	Kitt Peak	Spacewatch	·	2.0 km	MPC · JPL
712772	2014 WA_{155}	—	October 15, 2014	Kitt Peak	Spacewatch	LIX	3.5 km	MPC · JPL
712773	2014 WZ_{156}	—	September 24, 2014	Kitt Peak	Spacewatch	EOS	1.5 km	MPC · JPL
712774	2014 WE_{157}	—	October 25, 2014	Mount Lemmon	Mount Lemmon Survey	·	2.6 km	MPC · JPL
712775	2014 WO_{157}	—	August 31, 2014	Haleakala	Pan-STARRS 1	·	650 m	MPC · JPL
712776	2014 WA_{158}	—	August 31, 2014	Haleakala	Pan-STARRS 1	HYG	2.2 km	MPC · JPL
712777	2014 WY_{160}	—	October 29, 2014	Haleakala	Pan-STARRS 1	·	2.9 km	MPC · JPL
712778	2014 WP_{166}	—	November 17, 2014	Haleakala	Pan-STARRS 1	·	2.4 km	MPC · JPL
712779	2014 WR_{166}	—	February 28, 2012	Haleakala	Pan-STARRS 1	KOR	1.4 km	MPC · JPL
712780	2014 WY_{166}	—	November 14, 1998	Kitt Peak	Spacewatch	EOS	1.7 km	MPC · JPL
712781	2014 WA_{168}	—	August 31, 2014	Haleakala	Pan-STARRS 1	(31811)	2.1 km	MPC · JPL
712782	2014 WR_{168}	—	January 18, 2012	Kitt Peak	Spacewatch	·	620 m	MPC · JPL
712783	2014 WB_{169}	—	September 24, 2014	Mount Lemmon	Mount Lemmon Survey	·	2.4 km	MPC · JPL
712784	2014 WZ_{169}	—	October 1, 2014	Haleakala	Pan-STARRS 1	·	580 m	MPC · JPL
712785	2014 WP_{172}	—	October 1, 2009	Mount Lemmon	Mount Lemmon Survey	·	1.9 km	MPC · JPL
712786	2014 WS_{172}	—	April 11, 2008	Mount Lemmon	Mount Lemmon Survey	·	2.2 km	MPC · JPL
712787	2014 WT_{172}	—	November 6, 2005	Mount Lemmon	Mount Lemmon Survey	·	2.2 km	MPC · JPL
712788	2014 WY_{175}	—	February 21, 2012	Mount Lemmon	Mount Lemmon Survey	LIX	3.5 km	MPC · JPL
712789	2014 WT_{177}	—	September 18, 2003	Kitt Peak	Spacewatch	·	2.1 km	MPC · JPL
712790	2014 WV_{181}	—	October 26, 2009	Kitt Peak	Spacewatch	EOS	1.6 km	MPC · JPL
712791	2014 WA_{183}	—	September 18, 2014	Haleakala	Pan-STARRS 1	·	2.1 km	MPC · JPL
712792	2014 WX_{183}	—	August 23, 2007	Kitt Peak	Spacewatch	·	3.0 km	MPC · JPL
712793	2014 WS_{185}	—	November 20, 2014	Mount Lemmon	Mount Lemmon Survey	·	1.0 km	MPC · JPL
712794	2014 WX_{186}	—	September 4, 2008	Kitt Peak	Spacewatch	·	2.6 km	MPC · JPL
712795	2014 WH_{189}	—	November 20, 2014	Haleakala	Pan-STARRS 1	VER	2.4 km	MPC · JPL
712796	2014 WQ_{191}	—	September 1, 2013	Haleakala	Pan-STARRS 1	·	2.5 km	MPC · JPL
712797	2014 WC_{192}	—	November 20, 2014	Haleakala	Pan-STARRS 1	·	2.5 km	MPC · JPL
712798	2014 WK_{192}	—	November 20, 2014	Haleakala	Pan-STARRS 1	·	1.0 km	MPC · JPL
712799	2014 WB_{196}	—	October 10, 2008	Mount Lemmon	Mount Lemmon Survey	·	2.6 km	MPC · JPL
712800	2014 WF_{196}	—	August 12, 2013	Haleakala	Pan-STARRS 1	·	2.2 km	MPC · JPL

== 712801–712900 ==
back to top

Designation			Discovery			Properties		Ref
Permanent	Provisional	Named after	Date	Site	Discoverer(s)	Category	Diam.	Ref
712801	2014 WM_{197}	—	September 23, 2014	Haleakala	Pan-STARRS 1	·	2.6 km	MPC · JPL
712802	2014 WA_{198}	—	November 17, 2009	Mount Lemmon	Mount Lemmon Survey	·	3.0 km	MPC · JPL
712803	2014 WS_{198}	—	September 20, 2014	Haleakala	Pan-STARRS 1	EOS	1.6 km	MPC · JPL
712804	2014 WS_{203}	—	November 17, 2014	Mount Lemmon	Mount Lemmon Survey	·	1.1 km	MPC · JPL
712805	2014 WG_{204}	—	April 19, 2006	Kitt Peak	Spacewatch	·	2.8 km	MPC · JPL
712806	2014 WV_{204}	—	July 16, 2013	Haleakala	Pan-STARRS 1	·	2.1 km	MPC · JPL
712807	2014 WC_{205}	—	November 17, 2014	Mount Lemmon	Mount Lemmon Survey	·	1.0 km	MPC · JPL
712808	2014 WD_{205}	—	September 28, 2008	Catalina	CSS	·	2.7 km	MPC · JPL
712809	2014 WU_{208}	—	April 2, 2006	Kitt Peak	Spacewatch	·	560 m	MPC · JPL
712810	2014 WE_{214}	—	October 7, 2008	Mount Lemmon	Mount Lemmon Survey	·	2.4 km	MPC · JPL
712811	2014 WO_{214}	—	August 31, 2014	Haleakala	Pan-STARRS 1	·	2.0 km	MPC · JPL
712812	2014 WN_{215}	—	November 18, 2014	Mount Lemmon	Mount Lemmon Survey	·	2.2 km	MPC · JPL
712813	2014 WZ_{215}	—	October 29, 2014	Haleakala	Pan-STARRS 1	·	2.3 km	MPC · JPL
712814	2014 WD_{219}	—	September 29, 2010	Mount Lemmon	Mount Lemmon Survey	V	620 m	MPC · JPL
712815	2014 WV_{219}	—	November 2, 2007	Kitt Peak	Spacewatch	·	640 m	MPC · JPL
712816	2014 WY_{220}	—	November 21, 2003	Kitt Peak	Spacewatch	HYG	2.1 km	MPC · JPL
712817	2014 WU_{221}	—	October 22, 2014	Mount Lemmon	Mount Lemmon Survey	PHO	670 m	MPC · JPL
712818	2014 WM_{226}	—	November 18, 2014	Haleakala	Pan-STARRS 1	·	2.2 km	MPC · JPL
712819	2014 WZ_{226}	—	October 20, 2014	Mount Lemmon	Mount Lemmon Survey	·	2.3 km	MPC · JPL
712820	2014 WX_{230}	—	September 29, 2009	Mount Lemmon	Mount Lemmon Survey	·	2.0 km	MPC · JPL
712821	2014 WS_{231}	—	October 29, 2003	Kitt Peak	Spacewatch	·	2.9 km	MPC · JPL
712822	2014 WB_{232}	—	October 26, 2014	Mount Lemmon	Mount Lemmon Survey	·	4.0 km	MPC · JPL
712823	2014 WB_{234}	—	March 29, 2012	Haleakala	Pan-STARRS 1	·	2.3 km	MPC · JPL
712824	2014 WK_{236}	—	November 20, 2014	Mount Lemmon	Mount Lemmon Survey	·	2.5 km	MPC · JPL
712825	2014 WE_{237}	—	November 20, 2014	Mount Lemmon	Mount Lemmon Survey	·	2.4 km	MPC · JPL
712826	2014 WH_{243}	—	October 31, 2010	Kitt Peak	Spacewatch	·	1.5 km	MPC · JPL
712827	2014 WW_{243}	—	August 18, 2014	Haleakala	Pan-STARRS 1	EOS	1.7 km	MPC · JPL
712828	2014 WJ_{245}	—	July 30, 2014	Haleakala	Pan-STARRS 1	·	730 m	MPC · JPL
712829	2014 WZ_{249}	—	November 21, 2014	Mount Lemmon	Mount Lemmon Survey	·	2.2 km	MPC · JPL
712830	2014 WJ_{251}	—	April 27, 2012	Haleakala	Pan-STARRS 1	·	1.5 km	MPC · JPL
712831	2014 WR_{255}	—	April 15, 2012	Haleakala	Pan-STARRS 1	·	3.0 km	MPC · JPL
712832	2014 WX_{256}	—	November 21, 2014	Haleakala	Pan-STARRS 1	·	980 m	MPC · JPL
712833	2014 WR_{264}	—	November 21, 2014	Haleakala	Pan-STARRS 1	·	2.3 km	MPC · JPL
712834	2014 WC_{265}	—	December 25, 2009	Kitt Peak	Spacewatch	EOS	1.8 km	MPC · JPL
712835	2014 WE_{269}	—	July 28, 2007	Mauna Kea	P. A. Wiegert, N. I. Hasan	·	3.0 km	MPC · JPL
712836	2014 WY_{269}	—	March 2, 2009	Kitt Peak	Spacewatch	·	660 m	MPC · JPL
712837	2014 WV_{273}	—	March 2, 2009	Mount Lemmon	Mount Lemmon Survey	V	480 m	MPC · JPL
712838	2014 WW_{275}	—	August 10, 2010	Kitt Peak	Spacewatch	·	740 m	MPC · JPL
712839	2014 WE_{276}	—	November 21, 2014	Haleakala	Pan-STARRS 1	·	2.3 km	MPC · JPL
712840	2014 WT_{276}	—	March 31, 2011	Haleakala	Pan-STARRS 1	EOS	1.7 km	MPC · JPL
712841	2014 WW_{276}	—	November 21, 2014	Haleakala	Pan-STARRS 1	·	2.2 km	MPC · JPL
712842	2014 WQ_{277}	—	November 8, 2010	Mount Lemmon	Mount Lemmon Survey	·	950 m	MPC · JPL
712843	2014 WW_{277}	—	September 20, 2003	Kitt Peak	Spacewatch	·	1.6 km	MPC · JPL
712844	2014 WC_{279}	—	March 30, 2011	Piszkés-tető	K. Sárneczky, Z. Kuli	·	2.4 km	MPC · JPL
712845	2014 WJ_{279}	—	November 21, 2014	Haleakala	Pan-STARRS 1	V	390 m	MPC · JPL
712846	2014 WN_{281}	—	November 21, 2014	Haleakala	Pan-STARRS 1	·	2.6 km	MPC · JPL
712847	2014 WH_{282}	—	September 9, 2007	Kitt Peak	Spacewatch	·	2.9 km	MPC · JPL
712848	2014 WU_{282}	—	August 12, 2013	Haleakala	Pan-STARRS 1	·	2.5 km	MPC · JPL
712849	2014 WR_{285}	—	October 7, 2008	Kitt Peak	Spacewatch	·	2.5 km	MPC · JPL
712850	2014 WT_{285}	—	November 16, 2009	Mount Lemmon	Mount Lemmon Survey	·	2.7 km	MPC · JPL
712851	2014 WP_{287}	—	November 21, 2014	Haleakala	Pan-STARRS 1	·	2.0 km	MPC · JPL
712852	2014 WO_{288}	—	November 21, 2014	Haleakala	Pan-STARRS 1	·	2.7 km	MPC · JPL
712853	2014 WP_{288}	—	November 21, 2014	Haleakala	Pan-STARRS 1	·	2.9 km	MPC · JPL
712854	2014 WZ_{288}	—	February 25, 2011	Mount Lemmon	Mount Lemmon Survey	·	1.5 km	MPC · JPL
712855	2014 WK_{289}	—	November 21, 2014	Haleakala	Pan-STARRS 1	·	2.6 km	MPC · JPL
712856	2014 WA_{290}	—	November 21, 2014	Haleakala	Pan-STARRS 1	·	2.7 km	MPC · JPL
712857	2014 WD_{291}	—	April 13, 2011	Mount Lemmon	Mount Lemmon Survey	·	2.9 km	MPC · JPL
712858	2014 WS_{291}	—	November 10, 2009	Mount Lemmon	Mount Lemmon Survey	·	2.3 km	MPC · JPL
712859	2014 WE_{292}	—	November 21, 2014	Haleakala	Pan-STARRS 1	·	2.5 km	MPC · JPL
712860	2014 WK_{295}	—	September 23, 2008	Mount Lemmon	Mount Lemmon Survey	·	2.0 km	MPC · JPL
712861	2014 WB_{296}	—	April 19, 2013	Haleakala	Pan-STARRS 1	·	870 m	MPC · JPL
712862	2014 WW_{298}	—	November 21, 2014	Haleakala	Pan-STARRS 1	·	3.2 km	MPC · JPL
712863	2014 WS_{300}	—	October 17, 2003	Apache Point	SDSS Collaboration	EOS	1.7 km	MPC · JPL
712864	2014 WG_{301}	—	October 16, 2014	Mount Lemmon	Mount Lemmon Survey	·	2.5 km	MPC · JPL
712865	2014 WN_{302}	—	November 22, 2014	Mount Lemmon	Mount Lemmon Survey	·	1.7 km	MPC · JPL
712866	2014 WO_{302}	—	October 4, 2014	Mount Lemmon	Mount Lemmon Survey	L5	8.4 km	MPC · JPL
712867	2014 WR_{302}	—	November 22, 2014	Mount Lemmon	Mount Lemmon Survey	·	580 m	MPC · JPL
712868	2014 WY_{303}	—	November 27, 2009	Mount Lemmon	Mount Lemmon Survey	EOS	1.7 km	MPC · JPL
712869	2014 WW_{304}	—	October 10, 2008	Mount Lemmon	Mount Lemmon Survey	VER	2.5 km	MPC · JPL
712870	2014 WN_{305}	—	July 14, 2013	Haleakala	Pan-STARRS 1	·	3.1 km	MPC · JPL
712871	2014 WV_{306}	—	August 12, 2013	Haleakala	Pan-STARRS 1	·	2.2 km	MPC · JPL
712872	2014 WN_{308}	—	October 2, 2008	Kitt Peak	Spacewatch	·	2.3 km	MPC · JPL
712873	2014 WU_{309}	—	November 22, 2014	Haleakala	Pan-STARRS 1	·	1.5 km	MPC · JPL
712874	2014 WA_{310}	—	October 2, 2014	Haleakala	Pan-STARRS 1	·	2.0 km	MPC · JPL
712875	2014 WE_{310}	—	March 6, 2011	Mount Lemmon	Mount Lemmon Survey	·	2.3 km	MPC · JPL
712876	2014 WF_{310}	—	November 20, 2014	Haleakala	Pan-STARRS 1	VER	2.3 km	MPC · JPL
712877	2014 WV_{317}	—	September 6, 2008	Kitt Peak	Spacewatch	TIR	2.3 km	MPC · JPL
712878	2014 WJ_{318}	—	August 25, 2014	Haleakala	Pan-STARRS 1	EOS	1.6 km	MPC · JPL
712879	2014 WX_{318}	—	June 18, 2010	Mount Lemmon	Mount Lemmon Survey	BAP	760 m	MPC · JPL
712880	2014 WL_{319}	—	October 2, 2014	Haleakala	Pan-STARRS 1	·	1.8 km	MPC · JPL
712881	2014 WY_{319}	—	September 6, 2008	Mount Lemmon	Mount Lemmon Survey	·	2.2 km	MPC · JPL
712882	2014 WL_{320}	—	November 20, 2009	Kitt Peak	Spacewatch	·	2.1 km	MPC · JPL
712883	2014 WA_{321}	—	April 2, 2011	Mount Lemmon	Mount Lemmon Survey	VER	2.5 km	MPC · JPL
712884	2014 WE_{321}	—	August 23, 2003	Cerro Tololo	Deep Ecliptic Survey	·	1.7 km	MPC · JPL
712885	2014 WG_{321}	—	September 4, 2008	Kitt Peak	Spacewatch	·	2.4 km	MPC · JPL
712886	2014 WX_{321}	—	March 5, 2006	Kitt Peak	Spacewatch	·	2.3 km	MPC · JPL
712887	2014 WT_{322}	—	November 20, 2009	Mount Lemmon	Mount Lemmon Survey	EOS	1.6 km	MPC · JPL
712888	2014 WN_{323}	—	October 28, 2014	Mount Lemmon	Mount Lemmon Survey	EOS	1.7 km	MPC · JPL
712889	2014 WK_{324}	—	February 3, 2012	Haleakala	Pan-STARRS 1	·	840 m	MPC · JPL
712890	2014 WE_{325}	—	November 22, 2014	Haleakala	Pan-STARRS 1	·	2.8 km	MPC · JPL
712891	2014 WW_{326}	—	July 15, 2013	Haleakala	Pan-STARRS 1	·	2.1 km	MPC · JPL
712892	2014 WT_{328}	—	May 12, 2012	Mount Lemmon	Mount Lemmon Survey	·	2.3 km	MPC · JPL
712893	2014 WY_{328}	—	October 29, 2014	Haleakala	Pan-STARRS 1	·	3.7 km	MPC · JPL
712894	2014 WS_{330}	—	August 31, 2014	Haleakala	Pan-STARRS 1	·	2.5 km	MPC · JPL
712895	2014 WO_{331}	—	November 22, 2014	Haleakala	Pan-STARRS 1	EOS	1.7 km	MPC · JPL
712896	2014 WO_{333}	—	November 22, 2014	Haleakala	Pan-STARRS 1	·	2.4 km	MPC · JPL
712897	2014 WY_{334}	—	September 20, 2014	Haleakala	Pan-STARRS 1	LUT	3.1 km	MPC · JPL
712898	2014 WK_{335}	—	April 11, 2008	Mount Lemmon	Mount Lemmon Survey	·	1.7 km	MPC · JPL
712899	2014 WN_{335}	—	February 10, 2011	Mount Lemmon	Mount Lemmon Survey	EOS	1.4 km	MPC · JPL
712900	2014 WU_{335}	—	April 18, 2012	Kitt Peak	Spacewatch	URS	3.0 km	MPC · JPL

== 712901–713000 ==
back to top

Designation			Discovery			Properties		Ref
Permanent	Provisional	Named after	Date	Site	Discoverer(s)	Category	Diam.	Ref
712901	2014 WV_{335}	—	November 22, 2014	Haleakala	Pan-STARRS 1	EOS	1.4 km	MPC · JPL
712902	2014 WV_{337}	—	January 10, 2011	Mount Lemmon	Mount Lemmon Survey	·	2.3 km	MPC · JPL
712903	2014 WD_{338}	—	November 22, 2014	Haleakala	Pan-STARRS 1	·	3.2 km	MPC · JPL
712904	2014 WL_{342}	—	July 12, 2013	Haleakala	Pan-STARRS 1	·	2.0 km	MPC · JPL
712905	2014 WQ_{342}	—	October 1, 2008	Mount Lemmon	Mount Lemmon Survey	ARM	2.5 km	MPC · JPL
712906	2014 WC_{343}	—	April 17, 2012	Kitt Peak	Spacewatch	·	3.0 km	MPC · JPL
712907	2014 WH_{343}	—	March 6, 2011	Kitt Peak	Spacewatch	VER	2.1 km	MPC · JPL
712908	2014 WO_{343}	—	August 15, 2013	Haleakala	Pan-STARRS 1	·	1.9 km	MPC · JPL
712909	2014 WE_{346}	—	November 1, 2014	Mount Lemmon	Mount Lemmon Survey	·	3.1 km	MPC · JPL
712910	2014 WB_{347}	—	September 22, 2008	Kitt Peak	Spacewatch	·	2.2 km	MPC · JPL
712911	2014 WR_{348}	—	April 17, 2010	WISE	WISE	·	2.5 km	MPC · JPL
712912	2014 WK_{351}	—	October 2, 2014	Haleakala	Pan-STARRS 1	·	2.3 km	MPC · JPL
712913	2014 WG_{352}	—	October 21, 2014	Mount Lemmon	Mount Lemmon Survey	THM	1.9 km	MPC · JPL
712914	2014 WN_{353}	—	November 21, 2014	Haleakala	Pan-STARRS 1	·	2.5 km	MPC · JPL
712915	2014 WT_{356}	—	October 26, 2009	Mount Lemmon	Mount Lemmon Survey	·	2.0 km	MPC · JPL
712916	2014 WY_{357}	—	July 14, 2013	Haleakala	Pan-STARRS 1	·	2.3 km	MPC · JPL
712917	2014 WB_{358}	—	October 27, 2003	Kitt Peak	Spacewatch	·	3.4 km	MPC · JPL
712918	2014 WX_{359}	—	September 2, 2014	Haleakala	Pan-STARRS 1	·	2.2 km	MPC · JPL
712919	2014 WM_{360}	—	October 22, 2003	Apache Point	SDSS Collaboration	·	2.4 km	MPC · JPL
712920	2014 WV_{361}	—	August 9, 2013	Haleakala	Pan-STARRS 1	·	2.7 km	MPC · JPL
712921	2014 WC_{367}	—	November 22, 2014	Catalina	CSS	H	430 m	MPC · JPL
712922	2014 WT_{371}	—	November 22, 2014	Mount Lemmon	Mount Lemmon Survey	·	3.4 km	MPC · JPL
712923	2014 WW_{371}	—	July 9, 2013	Haleakala	Pan-STARRS 1	·	2.8 km	MPC · JPL
712924	2014 WR_{372}	—	November 16, 2003	Kitt Peak	Spacewatch	·	2.2 km	MPC · JPL
712925	2014 WL_{373}	—	November 1, 2014	Mount Lemmon	Mount Lemmon Survey	PHO	810 m	MPC · JPL
712926	2014 WF_{378}	—	September 9, 2007	Kitt Peak	Spacewatch	·	730 m	MPC · JPL
712927	2014 WQ_{379}	—	October 27, 2008	Kitt Peak	Spacewatch	·	2.3 km	MPC · JPL
712928	2014 WA_{381}	—	September 6, 2013	Kitt Peak	Spacewatch	·	2.9 km	MPC · JPL
712929	2014 WB_{383}	—	November 23, 2014	Mount Lemmon	Mount Lemmon Survey	VER	2.1 km	MPC · JPL
712930	2014 WW_{385}	—	September 26, 2008	Kitt Peak	Spacewatch	·	2.4 km	MPC · JPL
712931	2014 WL_{386}	—	September 4, 2014	Haleakala	Pan-STARRS 1	·	2.8 km	MPC · JPL
712932	2014 WW_{387}	—	April 2, 2011	Mount Lemmon	Mount Lemmon Survey	·	2.6 km	MPC · JPL
712933	2014 WO_{388}	—	June 20, 2013	Haleakala	Pan-STARRS 1	URS	2.8 km	MPC · JPL
712934	2014 WQ_{388}	—	November 23, 2014	Haleakala	Pan-STARRS 1	T_{j} (2.97) · EUP	2.8 km	MPC · JPL
712935	2014 WD_{389}	—	September 18, 2014	Haleakala	Pan-STARRS 1	·	2.4 km	MPC · JPL
712936	2014 WN_{389}	—	November 23, 2014	Haleakala	Pan-STARRS 1	·	2.8 km	MPC · JPL
712937	2014 WL_{391}	—	September 24, 2008	Kitt Peak	Spacewatch	EOS	1.8 km	MPC · JPL
712938	2014 WF_{394}	—	October 28, 2014	Haleakala	Pan-STARRS 1	·	2.5 km	MPC · JPL
712939	2014 WW_{394}	—	December 5, 2010	Mount Lemmon	Mount Lemmon Survey	·	2.6 km	MPC · JPL
712940	2014 WT_{395}	—	October 10, 2008	Mount Lemmon	Mount Lemmon Survey	·	3.8 km	MPC · JPL
712941	2014 WV_{395}	—	September 16, 2003	Kitt Peak	Spacewatch	·	2.3 km	MPC · JPL
712942	2014 WX_{395}	—	July 30, 2008	Mount Lemmon	Mount Lemmon Survey	TEL	1.1 km	MPC · JPL
712943	2014 WR_{398}	—	January 30, 2011	Haleakala	Pan-STARRS 1	·	1.8 km	MPC · JPL
712944	2014 WP_{400}	—	September 29, 2008	Mount Lemmon	Mount Lemmon Survey	·	2.6 km	MPC · JPL
712945	2014 WQ_{402}	—	September 20, 2014	Haleakala	Pan-STARRS 1	·	3.2 km	MPC · JPL
712946	2014 WV_{402}	—	August 31, 2014	Haleakala	Pan-STARRS 1	V	660 m	MPC · JPL
712947	2014 WX_{403}	—	November 26, 2014	Haleakala	Pan-STARRS 1	·	910 m	MPC · JPL
712948	2014 WP_{404}	—	October 6, 2008	Kitt Peak	Spacewatch	·	2.7 km	MPC · JPL
712949	2014 WG_{405}	—	April 21, 2012	Mount Lemmon	Mount Lemmon Survey	·	3.3 km	MPC · JPL
712950	2014 WO_{405}	—	November 26, 2014	Haleakala	Pan-STARRS 1	TIR	2.9 km	MPC · JPL
712951	2014 WV_{405}	—	November 19, 2014	Mount Lemmon	Mount Lemmon Survey	·	840 m	MPC · JPL
712952	2014 WA_{406}	—	November 19, 2014	Mount Lemmon	Mount Lemmon Survey	·	620 m	MPC · JPL
712953	2014 WE_{407}	—	October 6, 2008	Mount Lemmon	Mount Lemmon Survey	HYG	2.1 km	MPC · JPL
712954	2014 WF_{407}	—	November 26, 2014	Haleakala	Pan-STARRS 1	·	1.1 km	MPC · JPL
712955	2014 WS_{407}	—	September 17, 2006	Kitt Peak	Spacewatch	MAS	620 m	MPC · JPL
712956	2014 WS_{408}	—	September 29, 2008	Mount Lemmon	Mount Lemmon Survey	·	1.6 km	MPC · JPL
712957	2014 WS_{409}	—	October 23, 2003	Kitt Peak	Spacewatch	NYS	770 m	MPC · JPL
712958	2014 WQ_{412}	—	September 28, 2008	Mount Lemmon	Mount Lemmon Survey	·	2.6 km	MPC · JPL
712959	2014 WU_{412}	—	November 26, 2014	Haleakala	Pan-STARRS 1	·	1.1 km	MPC · JPL
712960	2014 WV_{413}	—	November 26, 2014	Haleakala	Pan-STARRS 1	·	2.1 km	MPC · JPL
712961	2014 WS_{417}	—	November 26, 2014	Haleakala	Pan-STARRS 1	V	550 m	MPC · JPL
712962	2014 WR_{418}	—	November 26, 2014	Haleakala	Pan-STARRS 1	·	3.1 km	MPC · JPL
712963	2014 WA_{419}	—	November 8, 2007	Mount Lemmon	Mount Lemmon Survey	·	770 m	MPC · JPL
712964	2014 WN_{419}	—	November 26, 2014	Haleakala	Pan-STARRS 1	·	2.9 km	MPC · JPL
712965	2014 WC_{423}	—	November 26, 2014	Haleakala	Pan-STARRS 1	·	2.3 km	MPC · JPL
712966	2014 WH_{425}	—	October 11, 2007	Kitt Peak	Spacewatch	·	640 m	MPC · JPL
712967	2014 WL_{425}	—	May 4, 2006	Kitt Peak	Spacewatch	·	2.9 km	MPC · JPL
712968	2014 WP_{429}	—	February 10, 2002	Socorro	LINEAR	·	1.5 km	MPC · JPL
712969	2014 WV_{429}	—	October 22, 2014	Catalina	CSS	·	2.6 km	MPC · JPL
712970	2014 WN_{430}	—	October 18, 2014	Mount Lemmon	Mount Lemmon Survey	·	1.1 km	MPC · JPL
712971	2014 WT_{430}	—	April 20, 2012	Mount Lemmon	Mount Lemmon Survey	·	2.9 km	MPC · JPL
712972	2014 WC_{433}	—	November 23, 2014	Mount Lemmon	Mount Lemmon Survey	·	2.2 km	MPC · JPL
712973	2014 WS_{433}	—	October 10, 2008	Mount Lemmon	Mount Lemmon Survey	·	2.9 km	MPC · JPL
712974	2014 WT_{433}	—	September 27, 2008	Mount Lemmon	Mount Lemmon Survey	·	2.2 km	MPC · JPL
712975	2014 WP_{434}	—	November 17, 2014	Haleakala	Pan-STARRS 1	VER	2.1 km	MPC · JPL
712976	2014 WO_{437}	—	August 15, 2013	Haleakala	Pan-STARRS 1	·	2.8 km	MPC · JPL
712977	2014 WR_{437}	—	November 27, 2014	Haleakala	Pan-STARRS 1	·	2.2 km	MPC · JPL
712978	2014 WW_{438}	—	September 26, 2008	Kitt Peak	Spacewatch	·	2.0 km	MPC · JPL
712979	2014 WQ_{440}	—	October 5, 2013	Haleakala	Pan-STARRS 1	·	3.2 km	MPC · JPL
712980	2014 WY_{442}	—	January 8, 2010	Kitt Peak	Spacewatch	VER	2.7 km	MPC · JPL
712981	2014 WS_{444}	—	October 10, 2008	Mount Lemmon	Mount Lemmon Survey	·	2.9 km	MPC · JPL
712982	2014 WQ_{445}	—	September 29, 2008	Mount Lemmon	Mount Lemmon Survey	·	2.3 km	MPC · JPL
712983	2014 WU_{449}	—	July 15, 2013	Haleakala	Pan-STARRS 1	·	1.9 km	MPC · JPL
712984	2014 WY_{449}	—	June 20, 2013	Haleakala	Pan-STARRS 1	EOS	1.8 km	MPC · JPL
712985	2014 WR_{450}	—	November 27, 2014	Haleakala	Pan-STARRS 1	·	1.3 km	MPC · JPL
712986	2014 WJ_{451}	—	April 2, 2011	Kitt Peak	Spacewatch	·	2.3 km	MPC · JPL
712987	2014 WN_{452}	—	September 3, 2013	Haleakala	Pan-STARRS 1	·	1.7 km	MPC · JPL
712988	2014 WV_{452}	—	November 21, 2014	Haleakala	Pan-STARRS 1	·	670 m	MPC · JPL
712989	2014 WW_{453}	—	September 4, 2008	Kitt Peak	Spacewatch	·	3.3 km	MPC · JPL
712990	2014 WP_{454}	—	October 26, 2014	Haleakala	Pan-STARRS 1	H	370 m	MPC · JPL
712991	2014 WJ_{455}	—	October 2, 2014	Haleakala	Pan-STARRS 1	·	2.8 km	MPC · JPL
712992	2014 WQ_{455}	—	January 12, 2010	Kitt Peak	Spacewatch	·	2.4 km	MPC · JPL
712993	2014 WY_{455}	—	June 3, 2013	Mount Lemmon	Mount Lemmon Survey	·	2.5 km	MPC · JPL
712994	2014 WV_{456}	—	June 14, 2012	Mount Lemmon	Mount Lemmon Survey	EOS	1.4 km	MPC · JPL
712995	2014 WJ_{457}	—	April 30, 2012	Mount Lemmon	Mount Lemmon Survey	·	2.2 km	MPC · JPL
712996	2014 WA_{458}	—	October 10, 2008	Mount Lemmon	Mount Lemmon Survey	·	2.3 km	MPC · JPL
712997	2014 WL_{461}	—	October 10, 2008	Mount Lemmon	Mount Lemmon Survey	·	2.4 km	MPC · JPL
712998	2014 WM_{463}	—	November 17, 2014	Haleakala	Pan-STARRS 1	·	2.3 km	MPC · JPL
712999	2014 WC_{464}	—	November 27, 2014	Haleakala	Pan-STARRS 1	EOS	1.6 km	MPC · JPL
713000	2014 WS_{467}	—	November 27, 2014	Haleakala	Pan-STARRS 1	H	560 m	MPC · JPL

back to top

== Meaning of names ==
As minor planet discoveries are confirmed, they are given a permanent number by the IAU's Minor Planet Center (MPC), and the discoverers can then submit names for them, following the IAU's naming conventions. The list below concerns those minor planets in the specified number-range that have received names, and explains the meanings of those names.

Official naming citations of newly named small Solar System bodies are approved and published in a bulletin by IAU's Working Group for Small Bodies Nomenclature (WGSBN). Before May 2021, citations were published in MPC's Minor Planet Circulars for many decades. Recent citations can also be found on the JPL Small-Body Database (SBDB). Until his death in 2016, German astronomer Lutz D. Schmadel compiled these citations into the Dictionary of Minor Planet Names (DMP) and regularly updated the collection.

Based on Paul Herget's The Names of the Minor Planets, Schmadel also researched the unclear origin of numerous asteroids, most of which had been named prior to World War II. This article incorporates text from this source, which is in the public domain: SBDB New namings may only be added to this list below after official publication as the preannouncement of names is condemned. The WGSBN publishes a comprehensive guideline for the naming rules of non-cometary small Solar System bodies.

Named minor planet	Provisional	This minor planet was named for...	Ref · Catalog
712499 Alexstefanescu	2014 US_{48}	Alex Stefanescu, retired Romanian-Canadian electrical engineer and amateur astronomer.	IAU · 712499
