= List of minor planets: 598001–599000 =

The following is a partial list of minor planets, running from minor-planet number 598001 through 599000, inclusive. The primary data for this and other partial lists is based on JPL's "Small-Body Orbital Elements" and data available from the Minor Planet Center. Critical list information is also provided by the MPC, unless otherwise specified from Lowell Observatory. A detailed description of the table's columns and additional sources are given on the main page including a complete list of every page in this series, and a statistical break-up on the dynamical classification of minor planets.

Also see the summary list of all named bodies in numerical and alphabetical order, and the corresponding naming citations for the number range of this particular list. New namings may only be added to this list after official publication, as the preannouncement of names is condemned by the Working Group for Small Bodies Nomenclature of the International Astronomical Union.

Near-Earth obj.	MBA (inner)	MBA (outer)	Centaur
Mars-crosser	MBA (middle)	Jupiter trojan	Trans-Neptunian obj.
Unclassified

== 598001–598100 ==
Designation			Discovery			Properties		Ref
Permanent	Provisional	Named after	Date	Site	Discoverer(s)	Category	Diam.	Ref
598001	2008 CZ_{21}	—	February 8, 2008	Socorro	LINEAR	AMO	280 m	MPC · JPL
598002	2008 CO_{28}	—	January 11, 2008	Kitt Peak	Spacewatch	V	650 m	MPC · JPL
598003	2008 CN_{38}	—	February 2, 2008	Mount Lemmon	Mount Lemmon Survey	·	1.4 km	MPC · JPL
598004	2008 CU_{51}	—	December 5, 2007	Mount Lemmon	Mount Lemmon Survey	·	800 m	MPC · JPL
598005	2008 CF_{59}	—	February 7, 2008	Mount Lemmon	Mount Lemmon Survey	·	1.8 km	MPC · JPL
598006	2008 CJ_{59}	—	February 7, 2008	Mount Lemmon	Mount Lemmon Survey	·	770 m	MPC · JPL
598007	2008 CS_{69}	—	February 8, 2008	Dauban	F. Kugel, C. Rinner	ADE	1.3 km	MPC · JPL
598008	2008 CA_{72}	—	December 15, 2007	Kitt Peak	Spacewatch	·	1.8 km	MPC · JPL
598009	2008 CG_{74}	—	October 19, 2003	Kitt Peak	Spacewatch	·	710 m	MPC · JPL
598010	2008 CD_{82}	—	February 7, 2008	Kitt Peak	Spacewatch	·	1.2 km	MPC · JPL
598011	2008 CP_{82}	—	December 30, 2007	Kitt Peak	Spacewatch	·	880 m	MPC · JPL
598012	2008 CF_{85}	—	January 10, 2008	Mount Lemmon	Mount Lemmon Survey	NYS	1.3 km	MPC · JPL
598013	2008 CH_{95}	—	February 8, 2008	Mount Lemmon	Mount Lemmon Survey	·	980 m	MPC · JPL
598014	2008 CK_{96}	—	November 4, 2007	Kitt Peak	Spacewatch	·	660 m	MPC · JPL
598015	2008 CG_{114}	—	February 10, 2008	Kitt Peak	Spacewatch	·	1.1 km	MPC · JPL
598016	2008 CS_{114}	—	February 10, 2008	Mount Lemmon	Mount Lemmon Survey	·	1.2 km	MPC · JPL
598017	2008 CV_{116}	—	September 19, 2006	Kitt Peak	Spacewatch	CLA	1.3 km	MPC · JPL
598018	2008 CB_{124}	—	February 7, 2008	Mount Lemmon	Mount Lemmon Survey	·	900 m	MPC · JPL
598019	2008 CN_{131}	—	February 8, 2008	Kitt Peak	Spacewatch	·	1.9 km	MPC · JPL
598020	2008 CS_{147}	—	September 19, 2006	Catalina	CSS	·	2.0 km	MPC · JPL
598021	2008 CM_{160}	—	February 9, 2008	Kitt Peak	Spacewatch	·	780 m	MPC · JPL
598022	2008 CC_{165}	—	February 10, 2008	Mount Lemmon	Mount Lemmon Survey	TEL	1.2 km	MPC · JPL
598023	2008 CO_{178}	—	January 31, 2008	Catalina	CSS	·	1.2 km	MPC · JPL
598024	2008 CL_{207}	—	February 13, 2008	Mount Lemmon	Mount Lemmon Survey	·	1.0 km	MPC · JPL
598025	2008 CZ_{210}	—	February 2, 2008	Kitt Peak	Spacewatch	·	450 m	MPC · JPL
598026	2008 CN_{220}	—	February 7, 2008	Mount Lemmon	Mount Lemmon Survey	·	2.1 km	MPC · JPL
598027	2008 CT_{220}	—	February 10, 2008	Mount Lemmon	Mount Lemmon Survey	·	1.0 km	MPC · JPL
598028	2008 CV_{220}	—	April 29, 2014	Haleakala	Pan-STARRS 1	·	1.6 km	MPC · JPL
598029	2008 CW_{220}	—	February 8, 2008	Kitt Peak	Spacewatch	·	750 m	MPC · JPL
598030	2008 CC_{221}	—	February 12, 2008	Kitt Peak	Spacewatch	·	780 m	MPC · JPL
598031	2008 CM_{222}	—	February 2, 2008	Mount Lemmon	Mount Lemmon Survey	·	970 m	MPC · JPL
598032	2008 CW_{222}	—	February 10, 2008	Mount Lemmon	Mount Lemmon Survey	·	1.4 km	MPC · JPL
598033	2008 CD_{223}	—	January 20, 2013	Mount Lemmon	Mount Lemmon Survey	·	1.8 km	MPC · JPL
598034	2008 CE_{223}	—	February 7, 2008	Mount Lemmon	Mount Lemmon Survey	·	930 m	MPC · JPL
598035	2008 CH_{223}	—	March 14, 2012	Mount Lemmon	Mount Lemmon Survey	MAS	580 m	MPC · JPL
598036	2008 CV_{223}	—	October 13, 2010	Mount Lemmon	Mount Lemmon Survey	·	940 m	MPC · JPL
598037	2008 CW_{225}	—	February 8, 2008	Mount Lemmon	Mount Lemmon Survey	·	1.5 km	MPC · JPL
598038	2008 CJ_{228}	—	September 20, 1995	Kitt Peak	Spacewatch	V	440 m	MPC · JPL
598039	2008 CN_{228}	—	February 13, 2008	Mount Lemmon	Mount Lemmon Survey	·	1.2 km	MPC · JPL
598040	2008 CU_{228}	—	April 8, 2014	Haleakala	Pan-STARRS 1	·	1.7 km	MPC · JPL
598041	2008 CW_{228}	—	January 13, 2008	Kitt Peak	Spacewatch	·	800 m	MPC · JPL
598042	2008 CP_{229}	—	February 12, 2008	Mount Lemmon	Mount Lemmon Survey	·	1.2 km	MPC · JPL
598043	2008 CT_{229}	—	January 20, 2013	Mount Lemmon	Mount Lemmon Survey	·	1.8 km	MPC · JPL
598044	2008 CT_{230}	—	October 2, 2010	Kitt Peak	Spacewatch	·	830 m	MPC · JPL
598045	2008 CB_{233}	—	February 9, 2008	Mount Lemmon	Mount Lemmon Survey	·	2.3 km	MPC · JPL
598046	2008 CH_{233}	—	March 28, 2012	Kitt Peak	Spacewatch	·	710 m	MPC · JPL
598047	2008 CX_{234}	—	May 5, 2014	Cerro Tololo-DECam	DECam	·	1.4 km	MPC · JPL
598048	2008 CU_{238}	—	February 8, 2008	Kitt Peak	Spacewatch	·	1.5 km	MPC · JPL
598049	2008 CD_{242}	—	February 9, 2008	Mount Lemmon	Mount Lemmon Survey	·	1.6 km	MPC · JPL
598050	2008 CE_{242}	—	February 12, 2008	Kitt Peak	Spacewatch	·	780 m	MPC · JPL
598051	2008 CF_{247}	—	February 8, 2008	Mount Lemmon	Mount Lemmon Survey	·	2.2 km	MPC · JPL
598052	2008 DM_{4}	—	February 9, 2008	Mount Lemmon	Mount Lemmon Survey	·	410 m	MPC · JPL
598053	2008 DX_{8}	—	February 7, 2008	Kitt Peak	Spacewatch	·	850 m	MPC · JPL
598054	2008 DF_{14}	—	February 9, 2008	Mount Lemmon	Mount Lemmon Survey	·	1.3 km	MPC · JPL
598055	2008 DV_{34}	—	January 12, 2008	Mount Lemmon	Mount Lemmon Survey	3:2	5.1 km	MPC · JPL
598056	2008 DG_{60}	—	February 28, 2008	Kitt Peak	Spacewatch	·	760 m	MPC · JPL
598057	2008 DZ_{60}	—	June 17, 2005	Mount Lemmon	Mount Lemmon Survey	·	690 m	MPC · JPL
598058	2008 DH_{66}	—	February 28, 2008	Kitt Peak	Spacewatch	·	2.6 km	MPC · JPL
598059	2008 DE_{72}	—	February 1, 2008	Kitt Peak	Spacewatch	·	1.7 km	MPC · JPL
598060	2008 DY_{90}	—	February 28, 2008	Mount Lemmon	Mount Lemmon Survey	·	960 m	MPC · JPL
598061	2008 DS_{91}	—	February 25, 2015	Haleakala	Pan-STARRS 1	PHO	1.2 km	MPC · JPL
598062	2008 DT_{91}	—	February 18, 2008	Mount Lemmon	Mount Lemmon Survey	H	440 m	MPC · JPL
598063	2008 DA_{93}	—	February 3, 2008	Kitt Peak	Spacewatch	·	990 m	MPC · JPL
598064	2008 DC_{93}	—	February 11, 2008	Kitt Peak	Spacewatch	·	880 m	MPC · JPL
598065	2008 DF_{93}	—	January 16, 2015	Haleakala	Pan-STARRS 1	·	690 m	MPC · JPL
598066	2008 DM_{94}	—	February 25, 2008	Mount Lemmon	Mount Lemmon Survey	NYS	740 m	MPC · JPL
598067	2008 DN_{97}	—	February 27, 2008	Kitt Peak	Spacewatch	·	950 m	MPC · JPL
598068	2008 DO_{98}	—	February 28, 2008	Mount Lemmon	Mount Lemmon Survey	·	1.5 km	MPC · JPL
598069	2008 EV_{3}	—	January 17, 2008	Kitt Peak	Spacewatch	·	1.1 km	MPC · JPL
598070	2008 EK_{7}	—	March 6, 2008	Kachina	Hobart, J.	THB	3.0 km	MPC · JPL
598071	2008 EV_{13}	—	March 1, 2008	Kitt Peak	Spacewatch	·	2.1 km	MPC · JPL
598072	2008 EN_{21}	—	March 2, 2008	Mount Lemmon	Mount Lemmon Survey	·	1.5 km	MPC · JPL
598073	2008 ED_{29}	—	March 4, 2008	Mount Lemmon	Mount Lemmon Survey	L5	9.8 km	MPC · JPL
598074	2008 EE_{31}	—	September 13, 2002	Palomar	NEAT	·	670 m	MPC · JPL
598075	2008 ES_{33}	—	September 20, 1995	Kitt Peak	Spacewatch	KOR	1.3 km	MPC · JPL
598076	2008 EC_{35}	—	March 2, 2008	Mount Lemmon	Mount Lemmon Survey	·	1.9 km	MPC · JPL
598077	2008 EG_{35}	—	March 2, 2008	Mount Lemmon	Mount Lemmon Survey	·	1.7 km	MPC · JPL
598078	2008 EH_{35}	—	March 2, 2008	Mount Lemmon	Mount Lemmon Survey	·	1.1 km	MPC · JPL
598079	2008 EJ_{50}	—	February 28, 2008	Mount Lemmon	Mount Lemmon Survey	EOS	1.4 km	MPC · JPL
598080	2008 EC_{53}	—	June 6, 2005	Kitt Peak	Spacewatch	V	700 m	MPC · JPL
598081	2008 EV_{53}	—	November 11, 2006	Kitt Peak	Spacewatch	V	750 m	MPC · JPL
598082	2008 EU_{57}	—	September 26, 2006	Mount Lemmon	Mount Lemmon Survey	THM	1.8 km	MPC · JPL
598083	2008 EV_{62}	—	March 9, 2008	Mount Lemmon	Mount Lemmon Survey	·	900 m	MPC · JPL
598084	2008 EQ_{79}	—	October 1, 2006	Kitt Peak	Spacewatch	·	870 m	MPC · JPL
598085	2008 EV_{79}	—	March 9, 2008	Mount Lemmon	Mount Lemmon Survey	·	1.3 km	MPC · JPL
598086	2008 EO_{87}	—	March 9, 2008	Mount Lemmon	Mount Lemmon Survey	TIR	1.8 km	MPC · JPL
598087	2008 EY_{87}	—	March 8, 2008	Mount Lemmon	Mount Lemmon Survey	·	2.3 km	MPC · JPL
598088	2008 EF_{90}	—	March 5, 2008	Mount Lemmon	Mount Lemmon Survey	·	2.2 km	MPC · JPL
598089	2008 EW_{95}	—	March 6, 2008	Mount Lemmon	Mount Lemmon Survey	·	2.1 km	MPC · JPL
598090	2008 EK_{96}	—	February 8, 2008	Mount Lemmon	Mount Lemmon Survey	MAS	680 m	MPC · JPL
598091	2008 EP_{96}	—	March 7, 2008	Mount Lemmon	Mount Lemmon Survey	·	1.7 km	MPC · JPL
598092	2008 EN_{106}	—	February 9, 2008	Kitt Peak	Spacewatch	·	1.6 km	MPC · JPL
598093	2008 EF_{110}	—	March 1, 2008	Kitt Peak	Spacewatch	PHO	760 m	MPC · JPL
598094	2008 EA_{111}	—	October 20, 1995	Kitt Peak	Spacewatch	·	1.8 km	MPC · JPL
598095	2008 ED_{113}	—	March 8, 2008	Kitt Peak	Spacewatch	·	660 m	MPC · JPL
598096	2008 EM_{125}	—	March 10, 2008	Mount Lemmon	Mount Lemmon Survey	·	2.0 km	MPC · JPL
598097	2008 EO_{126}	—	March 10, 2008	Mount Lemmon	Mount Lemmon Survey	·	2.2 km	MPC · JPL
598098	2008 ET_{132}	—	February 10, 2008	Kitt Peak	Spacewatch	NAE	1.8 km	MPC · JPL
598099	2008 EB_{133}	—	March 11, 2008	Mount Lemmon	Mount Lemmon Survey	EOS	1.7 km	MPC · JPL
598100	2008 EH_{142}	—	March 12, 2008	Kitt Peak	Spacewatch	·	1.5 km	MPC · JPL

== 598101–598200 ==
back to top

Designation			Discovery			Properties		Ref
Permanent	Provisional	Named after	Date	Site	Discoverer(s)	Category	Diam.	Ref
598101	2008 EQ_{161}	—	March 8, 2008	Mount Lemmon	Mount Lemmon Survey	·	820 m	MPC · JPL
598102	2008 ET_{168}	—	March 12, 2008	Kitt Peak	Spacewatch	TIR	1.8 km	MPC · JPL
598103	2008 EG_{172}	—	March 4, 2012	Mount Lemmon	Mount Lemmon Survey	MAS	680 m	MPC · JPL
598104	2008 EH_{172}	—	March 6, 2008	Mount Lemmon	Mount Lemmon Survey	·	1.4 km	MPC · JPL
598105	2008 EC_{174}	—	February 13, 2015	Mount Lemmon	Mount Lemmon Survey	·	1.0 km	MPC · JPL
598106	2008 ED_{176}	—	March 10, 2008	Kitt Peak	Spacewatch	·	1.8 km	MPC · JPL
598107	2008 EG_{177}	—	February 7, 2013	Kitt Peak	Spacewatch	·	1.5 km	MPC · JPL
598108	2008 EY_{177}	—	October 25, 2011	Haleakala	Pan-STARRS 1	·	1.4 km	MPC · JPL
598109	2008 EX_{179}	—	March 2, 2013	Mount Lemmon	Mount Lemmon Survey	H	380 m	MPC · JPL
598110	2008 ET_{180}	—	March 2, 2008	Mount Lemmon	Mount Lemmon Survey	·	1.0 km	MPC · JPL
598111	2008 EU_{181}	—	February 9, 2008	Kitt Peak	Spacewatch	EOS	1.5 km	MPC · JPL
598112	2008 EY_{181}	—	February 28, 2008	Kitt Peak	Spacewatch	NYS	960 m	MPC · JPL
598113	2008 EM_{183}	—	July 25, 2015	Haleakala	Pan-STARRS 1	·	1.6 km	MPC · JPL
598114	2008 EO_{183}	—	March 10, 2008	Kitt Peak	Spacewatch	·	870 m	MPC · JPL
598115	2008 EW_{183}	—	January 15, 2015	Mount Lemmon	Mount Lemmon Survey	·	950 m	MPC · JPL
598116	2008 EL_{184}	—	January 17, 2013	Haleakala	Pan-STARRS 1	·	2.0 km	MPC · JPL
598117	2008 EY_{185}	—	June 11, 2012	Haleakala	Pan-STARRS 1	PHO	870 m	MPC · JPL
598118	2008 ER_{186}	—	February 14, 2013	Kitt Peak	Spacewatch	·	1.7 km	MPC · JPL
598119	2008 EX_{186}	—	September 25, 2015	Mount Lemmon	Mount Lemmon Survey	615	1.3 km	MPC · JPL
598120	2008 EK_{187}	—	March 28, 2012	Kitt Peak	Spacewatch	·	800 m	MPC · JPL
598121	2008 EL_{189}	—	August 15, 2009	Catalina	CSS	·	2.8 km	MPC · JPL
598122	2008 EP_{190}	—	March 11, 2008	Mount Lemmon	Mount Lemmon Survey	·	2.7 km	MPC · JPL
598123	2008 ER_{190}	—	March 7, 2008	Mount Lemmon	Mount Lemmon Survey	EOS	1.5 km	MPC · JPL
598124	2008 EK_{191}	—	March 5, 2008	Mount Lemmon	Mount Lemmon Survey	·	900 m	MPC · JPL
598125	2008 EZ_{191}	—	March 6, 2008	Mount Lemmon	Mount Lemmon Survey	·	1.4 km	MPC · JPL
598126	2008 EZ_{194}	—	March 11, 2008	Kitt Peak	Spacewatch	·	1.5 km	MPC · JPL
598127	2008 EA_{195}	—	March 10, 2008	Kitt Peak	Spacewatch	·	1.5 km	MPC · JPL
598128	2008 FJ_{9}	—	September 18, 2006	Kitt Peak	Spacewatch	·	1.1 km	MPC · JPL
598129	2008 FZ_{21}	—	March 27, 2008	Kitt Peak	Spacewatch	·	1.7 km	MPC · JPL
598130	2008 FC_{36}	—	March 28, 2008	Mount Lemmon	Mount Lemmon Survey	·	1.5 km	MPC · JPL
598131	2008 FK_{37}	—	March 28, 2008	Kitt Peak	Spacewatch	·	510 m	MPC · JPL
598132	2008 FE_{45}	—	March 28, 2008	Mount Lemmon	Mount Lemmon Survey	·	680 m	MPC · JPL
598133	2008 FC_{49}	—	March 12, 2008	Kitt Peak	Spacewatch	EOS	1.3 km	MPC · JPL
598134	2008 FA_{52}	—	March 8, 2008	Kitt Peak	Spacewatch	THM	1.6 km	MPC · JPL
598135	2008 FC_{53}	—	March 28, 2008	Kitt Peak	Spacewatch	EOS	1.6 km	MPC · JPL
598136	2008 FC_{54}	—	March 13, 2008	Kitt Peak	Spacewatch	·	2.0 km	MPC · JPL
598137	2008 FL_{58}	—	March 28, 2008	Mount Lemmon	Mount Lemmon Survey	·	2.3 km	MPC · JPL
598138	2008 FZ_{58}	—	February 10, 2008	Kitt Peak	Spacewatch	MAS	620 m	MPC · JPL
598139	2008 FO_{60}	—	March 29, 2008	Catalina	CSS	·	1.9 km	MPC · JPL
598140	2008 FH_{63}	—	March 27, 2008	Kitt Peak	Spacewatch	·	940 m	MPC · JPL
598141	2008 FP_{72}	—	March 4, 2008	Mount Lemmon	Mount Lemmon Survey	·	1.7 km	MPC · JPL
598142	2008 FW_{78}	—	December 27, 2006	Mount Lemmon	Mount Lemmon Survey	3:2	3.6 km	MPC · JPL
598143	2008 FC_{81}	—	March 27, 2008	Mount Lemmon	Mount Lemmon Survey	EOS	1.3 km	MPC · JPL
598144	2008 FK_{88}	—	March 28, 2008	Mount Lemmon	Mount Lemmon Survey	NYS	970 m	MPC · JPL
598145	2008 FB_{91}	—	November 19, 2006	Kitt Peak	Spacewatch	3:2	3.9 km	MPC · JPL
598146	2008 FS_{109}	—	March 31, 2008	Mount Lemmon	Mount Lemmon Survey	·	2.1 km	MPC · JPL
598147	2008 FJ_{111}	—	December 27, 2006	Mount Lemmon	Mount Lemmon Survey	·	2.3 km	MPC · JPL
598148	2008 FM_{111}	—	March 31, 2008	Mount Lemmon	Mount Lemmon Survey	·	2.3 km	MPC · JPL
598149	2008 FP_{116}	—	March 31, 2008	Kitt Peak	Spacewatch	·	3.1 km	MPC · JPL
598150	2008 FL_{118}	—	January 31, 1997	Kitt Peak	Spacewatch	·	1.5 km	MPC · JPL
598151	2008 FT_{131}	—	March 27, 2008	Mount Lemmon	Mount Lemmon Survey	·	1.2 km	MPC · JPL
598152	2008 FR_{134}	—	March 30, 2008	Kitt Peak	Spacewatch	·	990 m	MPC · JPL
598153	2008 FG_{138}	—	March 28, 2008	Mount Lemmon	Mount Lemmon Survey	·	1.2 km	MPC · JPL
598154	2008 FQ_{139}	—	March 31, 2008	Mount Lemmon	Mount Lemmon Survey	·	2.0 km	MPC · JPL
598155	2008 FB_{140}	—	March 29, 2008	Kitt Peak	Spacewatch	·	2.2 km	MPC · JPL
598156	2008 FK_{141}	—	March 31, 2008	Mount Lemmon	Mount Lemmon Survey	·	830 m	MPC · JPL
598157	2008 FM_{142}	—	July 19, 2015	Haleakala	Pan-STARRS 1	EOS	1.7 km	MPC · JPL
598158	2008 FT_{142}	—	March 10, 2008	Kitt Peak	Spacewatch	·	1.8 km	MPC · JPL
598159	2008 FV_{142}	—	March 28, 2008	Mount Lemmon	Mount Lemmon Survey	·	2.2 km	MPC · JPL
598160	2008 FZ_{142}	—	February 9, 2013	Haleakala	Pan-STARRS 1	·	1.8 km	MPC · JPL
598161	2008 FO_{143}	—	March 7, 2013	Mount Lemmon	Mount Lemmon Survey	TIR	2.0 km	MPC · JPL
598162	2008 FY_{143}	—	September 16, 2010	Kitt Peak	Spacewatch	·	2.1 km	MPC · JPL
598163	2008 FT_{144}	—	September 21, 2009	Mount Lemmon	Mount Lemmon Survey	·	780 m	MPC · JPL
598164	2008 FB_{146}	—	March 29, 2008	Kitt Peak	Spacewatch	·	940 m	MPC · JPL
598165	2008 FE_{146}	—	March 27, 2008	Mount Lemmon	Mount Lemmon Survey	·	980 m	MPC · JPL
598166	2008 FU_{146}	—	March 31, 2008	Mount Lemmon	Mount Lemmon Survey	·	2.1 km	MPC · JPL
598167	2008 FV_{146}	—	March 27, 2008	Mount Lemmon	Mount Lemmon Survey	V	460 m	MPC · JPL
598168	2008 GF_{3}	—	April 7, 2008	Eskridge	G. Hug	·	2.5 km	MPC · JPL
598169	2008 GH_{9}	—	April 1, 2008	Kitt Peak	Spacewatch	·	1.0 km	MPC · JPL
598170	2008 GD_{10}	—	April 1, 2008	Kitt Peak	Spacewatch	·	950 m	MPC · JPL
598171	2008 GB_{16}	—	October 2, 2005	Mount Lemmon	Mount Lemmon Survey	·	2.0 km	MPC · JPL
598172	2008 GG_{17}	—	December 22, 2006	Kitt Peak	Spacewatch	·	1.3 km	MPC · JPL
598173	2008 GN_{21}	—	April 12, 2008	Desert Eagle	W. K. Y. Yeung	MAS	630 m	MPC · JPL
598174	2008 GN_{22}	—	April 1, 2008	Mount Lemmon	Mount Lemmon Survey	·	1.9 km	MPC · JPL
598175	2008 GL_{27}	—	April 3, 2008	Kitt Peak	Spacewatch	·	970 m	MPC · JPL
598176	2008 GT_{28}	—	March 10, 2008	Kitt Peak	Spacewatch	·	2.2 km	MPC · JPL
598177	2008 GQ_{32}	—	April 3, 2008	Kitt Peak	Spacewatch	EOS	1.6 km	MPC · JPL
598178	2008 GC_{37}	—	April 3, 2008	Mount Lemmon	Mount Lemmon Survey	·	1.9 km	MPC · JPL
598179	2008 GO_{41}	—	April 4, 2008	Kitt Peak	Spacewatch	·	2.3 km	MPC · JPL
598180	2008 GF_{51}	—	April 5, 2008	Mount Lemmon	Mount Lemmon Survey	·	2.3 km	MPC · JPL
598181	2008 GY_{52}	—	April 5, 2008	Mount Lemmon	Mount Lemmon Survey	EOS	1.8 km	MPC · JPL
598182	2008 GV_{53}	—	April 5, 2008	Mount Lemmon	Mount Lemmon Survey	V	580 m	MPC · JPL
598183	2008 GE_{54}	—	April 5, 2008	Mount Lemmon	Mount Lemmon Survey	·	970 m	MPC · JPL
598184	2008 GT_{54}	—	April 5, 2008	Mount Lemmon	Mount Lemmon Survey	L5	6.9 km	MPC · JPL
598185	2008 GH_{58}	—	April 5, 2008	Mount Lemmon	Mount Lemmon Survey	·	1.7 km	MPC · JPL
598186	2008 GS_{59}	—	March 12, 2008	Mount Lemmon	Mount Lemmon Survey	·	1.1 km	MPC · JPL
598187	2008 GJ_{60}	—	July 27, 2005	Palomar	NEAT	V	940 m	MPC · JPL
598188	2008 GG_{64}	—	April 5, 2008	Kitt Peak	Spacewatch	·	640 m	MPC · JPL
598189	2008 GH_{69}	—	April 6, 2008	Kitt Peak	Spacewatch	PHO	940 m	MPC · JPL
598190	2008 GJ_{70}	—	April 6, 2008	Mount Lemmon	Mount Lemmon Survey	·	2.3 km	MPC · JPL
598191	2008 GY_{74}	—	April 7, 2008	Kitt Peak	Spacewatch	·	2.4 km	MPC · JPL
598192	2008 GP_{78}	—	April 7, 2008	Kitt Peak	Spacewatch	·	3.1 km	MPC · JPL
598193	2008 GA_{79}	—	April 7, 2008	Kitt Peak	Spacewatch	ERI	1.4 km	MPC · JPL
598194	2008 GQ_{84}	—	April 8, 2008	Mount Lemmon	Mount Lemmon Survey	EOS	1.5 km	MPC · JPL
598195	2008 GH_{86}	—	March 15, 2008	Mount Lemmon	Mount Lemmon Survey	·	1.1 km	MPC · JPL
598196	2008 GQ_{86}	—	April 9, 2008	Mount Lemmon	Mount Lemmon Survey	·	2.1 km	MPC · JPL
598197	2008 GJ_{95}	—	March 31, 2008	Mount Lemmon	Mount Lemmon Survey	·	760 m	MPC · JPL
598198	2008 GG_{96}	—	April 8, 2008	Kitt Peak	Spacewatch	·	2.5 km	MPC · JPL
598199	2008 GA_{98}	—	April 4, 2008	Kitt Peak	Spacewatch	·	930 m	MPC · JPL
598200	2008 GL_{98}	—	April 8, 2008	Kitt Peak	Spacewatch	·	2.9 km	MPC · JPL

== 598201–598300 ==
back to top

Designation			Discovery			Properties		Ref
Permanent	Provisional	Named after	Date	Site	Discoverer(s)	Category	Diam.	Ref
598201	2008 GW_{105}	—	April 11, 2008	Catalina	CSS	·	2.5 km	MPC · JPL
598202	2008 GC_{108}	—	April 13, 2008	Mount Lemmon	Mount Lemmon Survey	·	1.4 km	MPC · JPL
598203	2008 GS_{112}	—	April 1, 2008	Catalina	CSS	·	3.2 km	MPC · JPL
598204	2008 GE_{115}	—	April 11, 2008	Kitt Peak	Spacewatch	·	2.0 km	MPC · JPL
598205	2008 GT_{116}	—	December 14, 2006	Mount Lemmon	Mount Lemmon Survey	HYG	2.5 km	MPC · JPL
598206	2008 GF_{117}	—	April 11, 2008	Kitt Peak	Spacewatch	·	2.2 km	MPC · JPL
598207	2008 GS_{127}	—	April 14, 2008	Mount Lemmon	Mount Lemmon Survey	TIN	780 m	MPC · JPL
598208	2008 GY_{127}	—	April 14, 2008	Mount Lemmon	Mount Lemmon Survey	EOS	1.7 km	MPC · JPL
598209	2008 GL_{129}	—	April 3, 2008	Kitt Peak	Spacewatch	·	2.1 km	MPC · JPL
598210	2008 GQ_{130}	—	April 6, 2008	Kitt Peak	Spacewatch	·	2.5 km	MPC · JPL
598211	2008 GE_{133}	—	April 15, 2008	Mount Lemmon	Mount Lemmon Survey	·	2.6 km	MPC · JPL
598212	2008 GA_{134}	—	April 11, 2008	Mount Lemmon	Mount Lemmon Survey	·	2.0 km	MPC · JPL
598213	2008 GW_{137}	—	April 8, 2008	Kitt Peak	Spacewatch	·	2.1 km	MPC · JPL
598214	2008 GZ_{137}	—	October 13, 1999	Apache Point	SDSS Collaboration	EOS	1.8 km	MPC · JPL
598215	2008 GS_{140}	—	April 11, 2008	Kitt Peak	Spacewatch	·	2.5 km	MPC · JPL
598216	2008 GU_{149}	—	April 3, 2008	Kitt Peak	Spacewatch	TIR	2.2 km	MPC · JPL
598217	2008 GM_{150}	—	April 3, 2008	Kitt Peak	Spacewatch	EOS	1.7 km	MPC · JPL
598218	2008 GS_{150}	—	April 11, 2008	Mount Lemmon	Mount Lemmon Survey	·	1.2 km	MPC · JPL
598219	2008 GF_{151}	—	April 18, 2012	Mount Lemmon	Mount Lemmon Survey	·	820 m	MPC · JPL
598220	2008 GH_{151}	—	October 7, 2013	Mount Lemmon	Mount Lemmon Survey	·	1 km	MPC · JPL
598221	2008 GM_{151}	—	April 13, 2008	Mount Lemmon	Mount Lemmon Survey	·	2.2 km	MPC · JPL
598222	2008 GV_{153}	—	November 18, 2011	Mount Lemmon	Mount Lemmon Survey	·	1.3 km	MPC · JPL
598223	2008 GD_{154}	—	July 18, 2012	Catalina	CSS	·	730 m	MPC · JPL
598224	2008 GL_{156}	—	April 14, 2008	Mount Lemmon	Mount Lemmon Survey	·	2.3 km	MPC · JPL
598225	2008 GC_{158}	—	September 11, 2010	Mount Lemmon	Mount Lemmon Survey	·	2.9 km	MPC · JPL
598226	2008 GD_{158}	—	April 6, 2008	Kitt Peak	Spacewatch	LIX	2.6 km	MPC · JPL
598227	2008 GL_{158}	—	March 5, 2013	Mount Lemmon	Mount Lemmon Survey	·	2.1 km	MPC · JPL
598228	2008 GZ_{158}	—	April 6, 2008	Kitt Peak	Spacewatch	·	2.5 km	MPC · JPL
598229	2008 GQ_{159}	—	August 21, 2015	Haleakala	Pan-STARRS 1	·	1.6 km	MPC · JPL
598230	2008 GL_{160}	—	April 8, 2008	Mount Lemmon	Mount Lemmon Survey	V	510 m	MPC · JPL
598231	2008 GX_{160}	—	April 7, 2008	Kitt Peak	Spacewatch	·	2.2 km	MPC · JPL
598232	2008 GA_{161}	—	March 2, 2013	Mount Lemmon	Mount Lemmon Survey	LIX	2.8 km	MPC · JPL
598233	2008 GN_{163}	—	February 14, 2013	Haleakala	Pan-STARRS 1	EOS	1.4 km	MPC · JPL
598234	2008 GC_{164}	—	April 15, 2008	Mount Lemmon	Mount Lemmon Survey	·	2.3 km	MPC · JPL
598235	2008 GF_{164}	—	July 19, 2015	Haleakala	Pan-STARRS 1	·	1.7 km	MPC · JPL
598236	2008 GG_{164}	—	April 4, 2008	Mount Lemmon	Mount Lemmon Survey	·	2.1 km	MPC · JPL
598237	2008 GH_{164}	—	August 13, 2015	Haleakala	Pan-STARRS 1	EOS	1.5 km	MPC · JPL
598238	2008 GL_{164}	—	February 15, 2013	Haleakala	Pan-STARRS 1	·	2.0 km	MPC · JPL
598239	2008 GX_{164}	—	April 13, 2008	Kitt Peak	Spacewatch	·	1.0 km	MPC · JPL
598240	2008 GK_{166}	—	April 14, 2008	Mount Lemmon	Mount Lemmon Survey	·	2.2 km	MPC · JPL
598241	2008 GO_{167}	—	April 7, 2008	Kitt Peak	Spacewatch	·	2.1 km	MPC · JPL
598242	2008 GR_{167}	—	April 15, 2008	Mount Lemmon	Mount Lemmon Survey	HYG	2.2 km	MPC · JPL
598243	2008 GF_{168}	—	April 6, 2008	Mount Lemmon	Mount Lemmon Survey	L5	7.2 km	MPC · JPL
598244	2008 GB_{170}	—	April 12, 2008	Mount Lemmon	Mount Lemmon Survey	·	1.9 km	MPC · JPL
598245	2008 GG_{170}	—	April 15, 2008	Mount Lemmon	Mount Lemmon Survey	EOS	1.4 km	MPC · JPL
598246	2008 HG_{7}	—	March 27, 2008	Mount Lemmon	Mount Lemmon Survey	·	2.5 km	MPC · JPL
598247	2008 HQ_{9}	—	April 3, 2008	Mount Lemmon	Mount Lemmon Survey	·	980 m	MPC · JPL
598248	2008 HN_{16}	—	April 25, 2008	Kitt Peak	Spacewatch	·	1.2 km	MPC · JPL
598249	2008 HD_{18}	—	March 31, 2008	Mount Lemmon	Mount Lemmon Survey	·	1.9 km	MPC · JPL
598250	2008 HV_{20}	—	April 3, 2008	Kitt Peak	Spacewatch	·	2.4 km	MPC · JPL
598251	2008 HQ_{21}	—	February 22, 2004	Kitt Peak	Deep Ecliptic Survey	·	950 m	MPC · JPL
598252	2008 HE_{22}	—	April 26, 2008	Kitt Peak	Spacewatch	·	1.8 km	MPC · JPL
598253	2008 HW_{23}	—	March 10, 2002	Kitt Peak	Spacewatch	·	2.8 km	MPC · JPL
598254	2008 HU_{24}	—	April 27, 2008	Kitt Peak	Spacewatch	·	2.0 km	MPC · JPL
598255	2008 HT_{26}	—	September 28, 2006	Catalina	CSS	H	440 m	MPC · JPL
598256	2008 HU_{26}	—	April 6, 2008	Mount Lemmon	Mount Lemmon Survey	THM	1.7 km	MPC · JPL
598257	2008 HQ_{29}	—	April 1, 2008	Mount Lemmon	Mount Lemmon Survey	LIX	2.5 km	MPC · JPL
598258	2008 HC_{33}	—	April 6, 2008	Kitt Peak	Spacewatch	·	2.2 km	MPC · JPL
598259	2008 HX_{36}	—	April 30, 2008	Kitt Peak	Spacewatch	·	2.8 km	MPC · JPL
598260	2008 HY_{51}	—	April 29, 2008	Kitt Peak	Spacewatch	NYS	830 m	MPC · JPL
598261	2008 HP_{52}	—	April 29, 2008	Kitt Peak	Spacewatch	·	2.6 km	MPC · JPL
598262	2008 HX_{57}	—	April 1, 2008	Mount Lemmon	Mount Lemmon Survey	·	2.4 km	MPC · JPL
598263	2008 HT_{62}	—	April 3, 2008	Catalina	CSS	·	3.5 km	MPC · JPL
598264	2008 HW_{63}	—	April 29, 2008	Mount Lemmon	Mount Lemmon Survey	·	2.4 km	MPC · JPL
598265	2008 HA_{64}	—	April 29, 2008	Mount Lemmon	Mount Lemmon Survey	·	2.0 km	MPC · JPL
598266	2008 HO_{66}	—	November 7, 2007	Mount Lemmon	Mount Lemmon Survey	·	1.1 km	MPC · JPL
598267	2008 HZ_{66}	—	March 30, 2004	Kitt Peak	Spacewatch	MAS	660 m	MPC · JPL
598268	2008 HO_{71}	—	April 25, 2008	Kitt Peak	Spacewatch	·	1.2 km	MPC · JPL
598269	2008 HS_{71}	—	October 23, 2011	Haleakala	Pan-STARRS 1	·	1.6 km	MPC · JPL
598270	2008 HT_{71}	—	October 30, 2010	Mount Lemmon	Mount Lemmon Survey	·	990 m	MPC · JPL
598271	2008 HB_{72}	—	April 29, 2008	Mount Lemmon	Mount Lemmon Survey	EUP	2.8 km	MPC · JPL
598272	2008 HD_{72}	—	November 3, 2012	Haleakala	Pan-STARRS 1	·	2.8 km	MPC · JPL
598273	2008 HN_{72}	—	September 21, 2012	Mount Lemmon	Mount Lemmon Survey	L5	6.0 km	MPC · JPL
598274	2008 HK_{74}	—	April 27, 2008	Kitt Peak	Spacewatch	·	2.6 km	MPC · JPL
598275	2008 HN_{75}	—	April 29, 2008	Kitt Peak	Spacewatch	·	2.5 km	MPC · JPL
598276	2008 HX_{75}	—	April 27, 2008	Kitt Peak	Spacewatch	·	2.1 km	MPC · JPL
598277	2008 HR_{77}	—	April 29, 2008	Kitt Peak	Spacewatch	·	2.2 km	MPC · JPL
598278	2008 JB_{2}	—	July 29, 2005	Anderson Mesa	LONEOS	·	990 m	MPC · JPL
598279	2008 JJ_{8}	—	April 1, 2008	Mount Lemmon	Mount Lemmon Survey	LIX	2.7 km	MPC · JPL
598280	2008 JW_{9}	—	May 3, 2008	Kitt Peak	Spacewatch	·	2.2 km	MPC · JPL
598281	2008 JL_{12}	—	May 3, 2008	Kitt Peak	Spacewatch	·	1.8 km	MPC · JPL
598282	2008 JL_{15}	—	March 29, 2008	Mount Lemmon	Mount Lemmon Survey	·	400 m	MPC · JPL
598283	2008 JC_{16}	—	May 3, 2008	Mount Lemmon	Mount Lemmon Survey	·	2.2 km	MPC · JPL
598284	2008 JR_{24}	—	September 28, 2006	Kitt Peak	Spacewatch	H	440 m	MPC · JPL
598285	2008 JD_{27}	—	May 7, 2008	Mount Lemmon	Mount Lemmon Survey	·	1.5 km	MPC · JPL
598286	2008 JE_{31}	—	March 29, 2008	Kitt Peak	Spacewatch	PHO	730 m	MPC · JPL
598287	2008 JB_{33}	—	October 1, 2005	Catalina	CSS	·	1.5 km	MPC · JPL
598288	2008 JO_{33}	—	May 11, 2008	Mount Lemmon	Mount Lemmon Survey	·	3.7 km	MPC · JPL
598289	2008 JE_{36}	—	May 3, 2008	Mount Lemmon	Mount Lemmon Survey	·	2.4 km	MPC · JPL
598290	2008 JY_{42}	—	January 26, 2012	Haleakala	Pan-STARRS 1	·	2.3 km	MPC · JPL
598291	2008 JZ_{42}	—	November 9, 2009	Mount Lemmon	Mount Lemmon Survey	H	610 m	MPC · JPL
598292	2008 JB_{46}	—	May 6, 2008	Mount Lemmon	Mount Lemmon Survey	·	2.5 km	MPC · JPL
598293	2008 JC_{46}	—	May 3, 2008	Mount Lemmon	Mount Lemmon Survey	·	1.0 km	MPC · JPL
598294	2008 JP_{46}	—	November 10, 2010	Mount Lemmon	Mount Lemmon Survey	·	2.7 km	MPC · JPL
598295	2008 JS_{46}	—	May 14, 2008	Mount Lemmon	Mount Lemmon Survey	·	2.4 km	MPC · JPL
598296	2008 JU_{46}	—	May 7, 2008	Kitt Peak	Spacewatch	·	2.6 km	MPC · JPL
598297	2008 JA_{47}	—	August 12, 2015	Haleakala	Pan-STARRS 1	·	2.4 km	MPC · JPL
598298	2008 JC_{48}	—	October 19, 2015	Haleakala	Pan-STARRS 1	·	2.4 km	MPC · JPL
598299	2008 JN_{48}	—	May 14, 2008	Mount Lemmon	Mount Lemmon Survey	·	2.6 km	MPC · JPL
598300	2008 JZ_{48}	—	May 11, 2008	Kitt Peak	Spacewatch	EOS	1.3 km	MPC · JPL

== 598301–598400 ==
back to top

Designation			Discovery			Properties		Ref
Permanent	Provisional	Named after	Date	Site	Discoverer(s)	Category	Diam.	Ref
598301	2008 JQ_{50}	—	May 7, 2008	Mount Lemmon	Mount Lemmon Survey	·	3.1 km	MPC · JPL
598302	2008 JL_{51}	—	May 3, 2008	Mount Lemmon	Mount Lemmon Survey	EOS	1.7 km	MPC · JPL
598303	2008 KR_{2}	—	May 27, 2008	Kitt Peak	Spacewatch	·	3.1 km	MPC · JPL
598304	2008 KB_{4}	—	April 30, 2008	Mount Lemmon	Mount Lemmon Survey	·	2.6 km	MPC · JPL
598305	2008 KC_{10}	—	May 7, 2008	Mount Lemmon	Mount Lemmon Survey	·	1.0 km	MPC · JPL
598306	2008 KK_{13}	—	May 14, 2008	Mount Lemmon	Mount Lemmon Survey	EOS	1.7 km	MPC · JPL
598307	2008 KL_{13}	—	April 29, 2008	Kitt Peak	Spacewatch	·	680 m	MPC · JPL
598308	2008 KT_{14}	—	May 14, 2008	Kitt Peak	Spacewatch	·	2.5 km	MPC · JPL
598309	2008 KJ_{15}	—	May 3, 2008	Kitt Peak	Spacewatch	·	1.7 km	MPC · JPL
598310	2008 KL_{15}	—	May 27, 2008	Kitt Peak	Spacewatch	·	1.7 km	MPC · JPL
598311	2008 KG_{16}	—	February 23, 2007	Kitt Peak	Spacewatch	·	2.2 km	MPC · JPL
598312	2008 KK_{16}	—	May 27, 2008	Kitt Peak	Spacewatch	LIX	2.5 km	MPC · JPL
598313	2008 KC_{26}	—	May 29, 2008	Mount Lemmon	Mount Lemmon Survey	HYG	2.2 km	MPC · JPL
598314	2008 KU_{28}	—	April 8, 2008	Kitt Peak	Spacewatch	L5	6.5 km	MPC · JPL
598315	2008 KQ_{31}	—	April 26, 2008	Kitt Peak	Spacewatch	·	710 m	MPC · JPL
598316	2008 KR_{34}	—	May 31, 2008	Kitt Peak	Spacewatch	·	2.6 km	MPC · JPL
598317	2008 KF_{36}	—	May 29, 2008	Mount Lemmon	Mount Lemmon Survey	·	1.1 km	MPC · JPL
598318	2008 KS_{36}	—	May 29, 2008	Kitt Peak	Spacewatch	LIX	2.2 km	MPC · JPL
598319	2008 KV_{36}	—	April 30, 2008	Mount Lemmon	Mount Lemmon Survey	·	2.7 km	MPC · JPL
598320	2008 KC_{38}	—	May 30, 2008	Mount Lemmon	Mount Lemmon Survey	·	2.2 km	MPC · JPL
598321	2008 KK_{44}	—	April 16, 2016	Haleakala	Pan-STARRS 1	·	1.2 km	MPC · JPL
598322	2008 KC_{45}	—	May 28, 2008	Kitt Peak	Spacewatch	·	2.2 km	MPC · JPL
598323	2008 KX_{45}	—	May 31, 2008	Mount Lemmon	Mount Lemmon Survey	PHO	850 m	MPC · JPL
598324	2008 KN_{46}	—	April 4, 2016	Mount Lemmon	Mount Lemmon Survey	·	940 m	MPC · JPL
598325	2008 KJ_{47}	—	January 27, 2012	Mount Lemmon	Mount Lemmon Survey	·	2.5 km	MPC · JPL
598326	2008 KC_{48}	—	October 12, 2017	Mount Lemmon	Mount Lemmon Survey	H	490 m	MPC · JPL
598327	2008 KA_{49}	—	May 29, 2008	Kitt Peak	Spacewatch	·	1.6 km	MPC · JPL
598328	2008 LL_{1}	—	June 1, 2008	Mount Lemmon	Mount Lemmon Survey	·	2.2 km	MPC · JPL
598329	2008 LV_{2}	—	March 10, 2008	Kitt Peak	Spacewatch	MAS	670 m	MPC · JPL
598330	2008 LX_{2}	—	April 13, 2008	Mount Lemmon	Mount Lemmon Survey	EUP	2.9 km	MPC · JPL
598331	2008 LH_{4}	—	June 2, 2008	Mount Lemmon	Mount Lemmon Survey	·	980 m	MPC · JPL
598332	2008 LK_{7}	—	May 27, 2008	Kitt Peak	Spacewatch	·	2.2 km	MPC · JPL
598333	2008 LA_{11}	—	May 28, 2008	Mount Lemmon	Mount Lemmon Survey	NYS	860 m	MPC · JPL
598334	2008 LO_{17}	—	June 7, 2008	Cerro Burek	Burek, Cerro	·	3.7 km	MPC · JPL
598335	2008 LO_{19}	—	October 15, 2009	Mount Lemmon	Mount Lemmon Survey	·	2.4 km	MPC · JPL
598336	2008 LQ_{19}	—	June 22, 2012	Kitt Peak	Spacewatch	·	850 m	MPC · JPL
598337	2008 LT_{19}	—	June 6, 2008	Kitt Peak	Spacewatch	·	2.4 km	MPC · JPL
598338	2008 LR_{20}	—	September 12, 2015	Haleakala	Pan-STARRS 1	·	1.9 km	MPC · JPL
598339	2008 MS_{2}	—	June 30, 2008	Kitt Peak	Spacewatch	·	1.4 km	MPC · JPL
598340	2008 MV_{5}	—	February 10, 2011	Mount Lemmon	Mount Lemmon Survey	EUN	850 m	MPC · JPL
598341	2008 NO_{1}	—	July 4, 2008	Wildberg	R. Apitzsch	·	1.3 km	MPC · JPL
598342	2008 NR_{5}	—	July 8, 2008	Mount Lemmon	Mount Lemmon Survey	·	2.6 km	MPC · JPL
598343	2008 NF_{6}	—	July 2, 2008	Kitt Peak	Spacewatch	·	2.7 km	MPC · JPL
598344	2008 OG_{10}	—	September 26, 2003	Apache Point	SDSS Collaboration	·	3.0 km	MPC · JPL
598345	2008 OS_{12}	—	July 28, 2008	La Sagra	OAM	·	3.1 km	MPC · JPL
598346	2008 OW_{14}	—	July 30, 2008	Catalina	CSS	·	1.0 km	MPC · JPL
598347	2008 OB_{28}	—	September 21, 2012	Mount Lemmon	Mount Lemmon Survey	·	1.3 km	MPC · JPL
598348	2008 OB_{30}	—	July 29, 2008	Kitt Peak	Spacewatch	L4	5.7 km	MPC · JPL
598349	2008 OX_{31}	—	July 30, 2008	Kitt Peak	Spacewatch	L4	6.6 km	MPC · JPL
598350	2008 OY_{31}	—	July 29, 2008	Mount Lemmon	Mount Lemmon Survey	·	2.1 km	MPC · JPL
598351	2008 PE_{4}	—	August 3, 2008	Pla D'Arguines	R. Ferrando, Ferrando, M.	·	1.5 km	MPC · JPL
598352	2008 PA_{10}	—	August 4, 2008	La Sagra	OAM	·	3.6 km	MPC · JPL
598353	2008 PV_{13}	—	August 10, 2008	La Sagra	OAM	MAS	790 m	MPC · JPL
598354	2008 PR_{23}	—	August 2, 2008	Siding Spring	SSS	·	1.2 km	MPC · JPL
598355	2008 PY_{23}	—	August 12, 2008	Črni Vrh	Matičič, S.	H	420 m	MPC · JPL
598356	2008 PG_{24}	—	August 7, 2008	Kitt Peak	Spacewatch	L4	6.5 km	MPC · JPL
598357	2008 QJ_{2}	—	July 30, 2008	Kitt Peak	Spacewatch	·	1.2 km	MPC · JPL
598358	2008 QD_{7}	—	August 26, 2008	La Sagra	OAM	TIR	2.3 km	MPC · JPL
598359	2008 QN_{7}	—	August 2, 2008	La Sagra	OAM	·	1.2 km	MPC · JPL
598360	2008 QM_{12}	—	August 26, 2008	La Sagra	OAM	·	560 m	MPC · JPL
598361	2008 QL_{25}	—	August 29, 2008	Lulin	LUSS	L4	5.9 km	MPC · JPL
598362	2008 QW_{34}	—	August 27, 2008	Parc National des Cévennes	C. Demeautis, J.-M. Lopez	·	2.1 km	MPC · JPL
598363	2008 QT_{40}	—	August 27, 2008	Črni Vrh	Mikuž, B.	·	2.5 km	MPC · JPL
598364	2008 QE_{47}	—	August 20, 2008	Kitt Peak	Spacewatch	·	840 m	MPC · JPL
598365	2008 QV_{48}	—	August 25, 2008	Črni Vrh	Matičič, S.	·	2.2 km	MPC · JPL
598366	2008 QW_{48}	—	August 24, 2008	Kitt Peak	Spacewatch	·	1.1 km	MPC · JPL
598367	2008 QZ_{49}	—	August 24, 2008	Črni Vrh	Skvarč, J.	·	2.1 km	MPC · JPL
598368	2008 QB_{50}	—	September 5, 1996	Kitt Peak	Spacewatch	L4	10 km	MPC · JPL
598369	2008 QD_{51}	—	August 24, 2008	Kitt Peak	Spacewatch	·	1.6 km	MPC · JPL
598370	2008 QP_{51}	—	August 24, 2008	Kitt Peak	Spacewatch	L4	7.7 km	MPC · JPL
598371	2008 RS_{10}	—	September 21, 2004	Kitt Peak	Spacewatch	·	850 m	MPC · JPL
598372	2008 RN_{15}	—	September 4, 2008	Kitt Peak	Spacewatch	·	2.3 km	MPC · JPL
598373	2008 RM_{19}	—	August 24, 2008	Kitt Peak	Spacewatch	·	1.2 km	MPC · JPL
598374	2008 RY_{28}	—	September 2, 2008	Kitt Peak	Spacewatch	·	1.0 km	MPC · JPL
598375	2008 RX_{37}	—	September 2, 2008	Kitt Peak	Spacewatch	L4	6.4 km	MPC · JPL
598376	2008 RO_{54}	—	September 3, 2008	Kitt Peak	Spacewatch	·	2.6 km	MPC · JPL
598377	2008 RP_{55}	—	September 3, 2008	Kitt Peak	Spacewatch	·	1.1 km	MPC · JPL
598378	2008 RG_{61}	—	September 4, 2008	Kitt Peak	Spacewatch	TIR	1.9 km	MPC · JPL
598379	2008 RY_{62}	—	September 4, 2008	Kitt Peak	Spacewatch	L4	8.5 km	MPC · JPL
598380	2008 RA_{73}	—	September 6, 2008	Mount Lemmon	Mount Lemmon Survey	·	470 m	MPC · JPL
598381	2008 RQ_{79}	—	September 2, 2008	Sandlot	G. Hug	·	1.3 km	MPC · JPL
598382	2008 RV_{84}	—	September 4, 2008	Kitt Peak	Spacewatch	·	1.1 km	MPC · JPL
598383	2008 RX_{84}	—	September 4, 2008	Kitt Peak	Spacewatch	·	1.3 km	MPC · JPL
598384	2008 RX_{92}	—	September 6, 2008	Kitt Peak	Spacewatch	·	1.3 km	MPC · JPL
598385	2008 RC_{125}	—	September 7, 2008	Mount Lemmon	Mount Lemmon Survey	L4	7.0 km	MPC · JPL
598386	2008 RK_{126}	—	September 2, 2008	Kitt Peak	Spacewatch	L4	7.2 km	MPC · JPL
598387	2008 RU_{126}	—	September 4, 2008	Kitt Peak	Spacewatch	L4	6.2 km	MPC · JPL
598388	2008 RT_{127}	—	September 6, 2008	Mount Lemmon	Mount Lemmon Survey	·	1.2 km	MPC · JPL
598389	2008 RL_{129}	—	September 7, 2008	Mount Lemmon	Mount Lemmon Survey	·	1.0 km	MPC · JPL
598390	2008 RQ_{138}	—	September 6, 2008	Kitt Peak	Spacewatch	·	1.2 km	MPC · JPL
598391	2008 RE_{144}	—	September 2, 2008	Kitt Peak	Spacewatch	HNS	1.1 km	MPC · JPL
598392	2008 RB_{150}	—	September 7, 2008	Catalina	CSS	PHO	1.0 km	MPC · JPL
598393	2008 RX_{155}	—	September 4, 2008	Kitt Peak	Spacewatch	L4	8.9 km	MPC · JPL
598394	2008 RD_{156}	—	February 23, 2012	Kitt Peak	Spacewatch	·	1.8 km	MPC · JPL
598395	2008 RO_{156}	—	August 1, 2016	Haleakala	Pan-STARRS 1	BRG	1.2 km	MPC · JPL
598396	2008 RZ_{156}	—	September 7, 2008	Mount Lemmon	Mount Lemmon Survey	L4	7.1 km	MPC · JPL
598397	2008 RR_{157}	—	September 6, 2008	Mount Lemmon	Mount Lemmon Survey	MAS	490 m	MPC · JPL
598398	2008 RA_{162}	—	October 18, 2009	Mount Lemmon	Mount Lemmon Survey	L4	6.6 km	MPC · JPL
598399	2008 RK_{163}	—	September 6, 2008	Mount Lemmon	Mount Lemmon Survey	L4	5.8 km	MPC · JPL
598400	2008 RD_{166}	—	September 6, 2008	Kitt Peak	Spacewatch	L4	7.2 km	MPC · JPL

== 598401–598500 ==
back to top

Designation			Discovery			Properties		Ref
Permanent	Provisional	Named after	Date	Site	Discoverer(s)	Category	Diam.	Ref
598401	2008 RN_{166}	—	September 5, 2008	Kitt Peak	Spacewatch	L4	7.0 km	MPC · JPL
598402	2008 RD_{169}	—	September 4, 2008	Kitt Peak	Spacewatch	L4	6.9 km	MPC · JPL
598403	2008 RP_{170}	—	September 3, 2008	Kitt Peak	Spacewatch	·	1.1 km	MPC · JPL
598404	2008 RC_{172}	—	September 6, 2008	Mount Lemmon	Mount Lemmon Survey	L4	7.3 km	MPC · JPL
598405	2008 RH_{175}	—	September 6, 2008	Kitt Peak	Spacewatch	L4	7.3 km	MPC · JPL
598406	2008 RR_{175}	—	September 3, 2008	Kitt Peak	Spacewatch	L4	6.1 km	MPC · JPL
598407	2008 RZ_{175}	—	September 2, 2008	Kitt Peak	Spacewatch	L4	6.2 km	MPC · JPL
598408	2008 RJ_{180}	—	September 7, 2008	Mount Lemmon	Mount Lemmon Survey	EUN	690 m	MPC · JPL
598409	2008 SA_{9}	—	August 21, 2008	Kitt Peak	Spacewatch	·	2.5 km	MPC · JPL
598410	2008 SM_{19}	—	July 30, 2008	Kitt Peak	Spacewatch	·	1.9 km	MPC · JPL
598411	2008 SK_{37}	—	September 20, 2008	Kitt Peak	Spacewatch	L4	7.4 km	MPC · JPL
598412	2008 SV_{40}	—	September 20, 2008	Catalina	CSS	PHO	960 m	MPC · JPL
598413	2008 SA_{49}	—	September 20, 2008	Mount Lemmon	Mount Lemmon Survey	·	1.5 km	MPC · JPL
598414	2008 SG_{49}	—	August 24, 2008	Kitt Peak	Spacewatch	EUN	900 m	MPC · JPL
598415	2008 SG_{63}	—	September 5, 2008	Kitt Peak	Spacewatch	BRG	1.3 km	MPC · JPL
598416	2008 SL_{77}	—	April 18, 2007	Mount Lemmon	Mount Lemmon Survey	·	1.1 km	MPC · JPL
598417	2008 SX_{106}	—	September 7, 2008	Mount Lemmon	Mount Lemmon Survey	·	760 m	MPC · JPL
598418	2008 SV_{108}	—	September 22, 2008	Mount Lemmon	Mount Lemmon Survey	L4	8.3 km	MPC · JPL
598419	2008 SH_{118}	—	September 22, 2008	Mount Lemmon	Mount Lemmon Survey	(260)	2.8 km	MPC · JPL
598420	2008 SH_{143}	—	May 10, 2003	Kitt Peak	Spacewatch	(1547)	1.1 km	MPC · JPL
598421	2008 SR_{193}	—	September 25, 2008	Kitt Peak	Spacewatch	·	3.2 km	MPC · JPL
598422	2008 SY_{193}	—	September 25, 2008	Kitt Peak	Spacewatch	(5)	810 m	MPC · JPL
598423	2008 SO_{203}	—	September 26, 2008	Kitt Peak	Spacewatch	·	2.4 km	MPC · JPL
598424	2008 SG_{206}	—	October 25, 1995	Kitt Peak	Spacewatch	·	1.3 km	MPC · JPL
598425	2008 SW_{211}	—	September 29, 2008	Mount Lemmon	Mount Lemmon Survey	·	970 m	MPC · JPL
598426	2008 SG_{213}	—	September 2, 2008	Kitt Peak	Spacewatch	L4	4.9 km	MPC · JPL
598427	2008 SA_{214}	—	September 2, 2008	Kitt Peak	Spacewatch	L4	5.9 km	MPC · JPL
598428	2008 SJ_{214}	—	September 29, 2008	Mount Lemmon	Mount Lemmon Survey	L4	6.5 km	MPC · JPL
598429	2008 SY_{239}	—	September 21, 2008	Kitt Peak	Spacewatch	GEF	1.0 km	MPC · JPL
598430	2008 SQ_{241}	—	September 3, 2008	Kitt Peak	Spacewatch	·	1.4 km	MPC · JPL
598431	2008 SD_{245}	—	September 29, 2008	Mount Lemmon	Mount Lemmon Survey	L4	7.1 km	MPC · JPL
598432	2008 SR_{261}	—	September 24, 2008	Kitt Peak	Spacewatch	·	1.1 km	MPC · JPL
598433	2008 SK_{274}	—	September 20, 2008	Mount Lemmon	Mount Lemmon Survey	L4	6.9 km	MPC · JPL
598434	2008 SM_{275}	—	September 4, 2008	Kitt Peak	Spacewatch	L4	8.9 km	MPC · JPL
598435	2008 SO_{276}	—	September 24, 2008	Kitt Peak	Spacewatch	L4	7.3 km	MPC · JPL
598436	2008 SY_{276}	—	September 24, 2008	Mount Lemmon	Mount Lemmon Survey	L4	7.7 km	MPC · JPL
598437	2008 SW_{311}	—	September 24, 2008	Mount Lemmon	Mount Lemmon Survey	L4	7.3 km	MPC · JPL
598438	2008 SB_{313}	—	September 24, 2008	Kitt Peak	Spacewatch	·	2.1 km	MPC · JPL
598439	2008 ST_{314}	—	September 28, 2008	Mount Lemmon	Mount Lemmon Survey	EUN	900 m	MPC · JPL
598440	2008 SR_{315}	—	December 12, 2012	Kitt Peak	Spacewatch	L4	9.9 km	MPC · JPL
598441	2008 SV_{319}	—	September 23, 2008	Mount Lemmon	Mount Lemmon Survey	·	1 km	MPC · JPL
598442	2008 SU_{320}	—	October 6, 2012	Mount Lemmon	Mount Lemmon Survey	·	1.0 km	MPC · JPL
598443	2008 SW_{324}	—	September 24, 2008	Kitt Peak	Spacewatch	·	1.4 km	MPC · JPL
598444	2008 SQ_{327}	—	September 24, 2008	Kitt Peak	Spacewatch	·	1.1 km	MPC · JPL
598445	2008 SW_{327}	—	September 6, 2008	Kitt Peak	Spacewatch	·	920 m	MPC · JPL
598446	2008 SZ_{328}	—	September 22, 2008	Catalina	CSS	·	1.1 km	MPC · JPL
598447	2008 SX_{331}	—	September 28, 2009	Kitt Peak	Spacewatch	L4	6.8 km	MPC · JPL
598448	2008 SP_{333}	—	September 24, 2008	Kitt Peak	Spacewatch	L4	7.0 km	MPC · JPL
598449	2008 SA_{334}	—	April 6, 2002	Cerro Tololo	Deep Ecliptic Survey	·	990 m	MPC · JPL
598450	2008 SG_{335}	—	October 27, 2009	Mount Lemmon	Mount Lemmon Survey	L4	6.6 km	MPC · JPL
598451	2008 SW_{336}	—	July 14, 2013	Haleakala	Pan-STARRS 1	·	1.9 km	MPC · JPL
598452	2008 SO_{340}	—	September 23, 2008	Mount Lemmon	Mount Lemmon Survey	L4 · ERY	6.3 km	MPC · JPL
598453	2008 SY_{340}	—	September 21, 2008	Kitt Peak	Spacewatch	·	660 m	MPC · JPL
598454	2008 SB_{346}	—	September 29, 2008	Mount Lemmon	Mount Lemmon Survey	·	1.1 km	MPC · JPL
598455	2008 SQ_{347}	—	September 20, 2008	Mount Lemmon	Mount Lemmon Survey	VER	2.2 km	MPC · JPL
598456	2008 SB_{348}	—	September 23, 2008	Kitt Peak	Spacewatch	L4 · ERY	6.2 km	MPC · JPL
598457	2008 SK_{349}	—	September 27, 2008	Mount Lemmon	Mount Lemmon Survey	·	900 m	MPC · JPL
598458	2008 TM_{1}	—	August 29, 2008	Črni Vrh	Matičič, S.	THB	3.9 km	MPC · JPL
598459	2008 TL_{3}	—	October 6, 2008	Catalina	CSS	H	630 m	MPC · JPL
598460	2008 TL_{17}	—	September 6, 2008	Mount Lemmon	Mount Lemmon Survey	LEO	1.4 km	MPC · JPL
598461	2008 TR_{22}	—	October 1, 2008	Kitt Peak	Spacewatch	H	440 m	MPC · JPL
598462	2008 TE_{39}	—	September 22, 2008	Kitt Peak	Spacewatch	·	1.3 km	MPC · JPL
598463	2008 TN_{39}	—	October 1, 2008	Kitt Peak	Spacewatch	·	1.4 km	MPC · JPL
598464	2008 TR_{40}	—	October 1, 2008	Mount Lemmon	Mount Lemmon Survey	HNS	860 m	MPC · JPL
598465	2008 TB_{51}	—	October 2, 2008	Kitt Peak	Spacewatch	·	900 m	MPC · JPL
598466	2008 TZ_{58}	—	October 2, 2008	Kitt Peak	Spacewatch	·	1.0 km	MPC · JPL
598467	2008 TA_{81}	—	October 2, 2008	Mount Lemmon	Mount Lemmon Survey	·	470 m	MPC · JPL
598468	2008 TL_{82}	—	September 6, 2008	Catalina	CSS	·	1.6 km	MPC · JPL
598469	2008 TN_{92}	—	September 3, 2008	Kitt Peak	Spacewatch	·	1.2 km	MPC · JPL
598470	2008 TH_{97}	—	September 25, 2008	Kitt Peak	Spacewatch	L4	7.0 km	MPC · JPL
598471	2008 TY_{97}	—	September 20, 2008	Kitt Peak	Spacewatch	L4	8.7 km	MPC · JPL
598472	2008 TN_{99}	—	September 23, 2008	Mount Lemmon	Mount Lemmon Survey	·	1.6 km	MPC · JPL
598473	2008 TE_{108}	—	October 9, 2004	Kitt Peak	Spacewatch	·	1.1 km	MPC · JPL
598474	2008 TF_{113}	—	September 23, 2008	Kitt Peak	Spacewatch	·	1.7 km	MPC · JPL
598475	2008 TH_{119}	—	September 2, 2008	Kitt Peak	Spacewatch	·	1.4 km	MPC · JPL
598476	2008 TJ_{120}	—	October 7, 2008	Mount Lemmon	Mount Lemmon Survey	·	1.4 km	MPC · JPL
598477	2008 TU_{137}	—	October 8, 2008	Mount Lemmon	Mount Lemmon Survey	EUN	870 m	MPC · JPL
598478	2008 TW_{143}	—	October 9, 2008	Mount Lemmon	Mount Lemmon Survey	·	1.3 km	MPC · JPL
598479	2008 TB_{146}	—	March 3, 2006	Kitt Peak	Spacewatch	AST	1.3 km	MPC · JPL
598480	2008 TP_{153}	—	October 9, 2008	Mount Lemmon	Mount Lemmon Survey	EUN	860 m	MPC · JPL
598481	2008 TH_{156}	—	October 9, 2008	Mount Lemmon	Mount Lemmon Survey	·	1.2 km	MPC · JPL
598482	2008 TY_{158}	—	October 1, 2008	Mount Lemmon	Mount Lemmon Survey	·	1.1 km	MPC · JPL
598483	2008 TS_{164}	—	October 1, 2008	Kitt Peak	Spacewatch	·	3.1 km	MPC · JPL
598484	2008 TS_{193}	—	October 1, 2008	Mount Lemmon	Mount Lemmon Survey	·	520 m	MPC · JPL
598485	2008 TV_{194}	—	October 10, 2008	Mount Lemmon	Mount Lemmon Survey	EUN	1.1 km	MPC · JPL
598486	2008 TK_{196}	—	October 10, 2008	Mount Lemmon	Mount Lemmon Survey	·	2.0 km	MPC · JPL
598487	2008 TL_{196}	—	October 9, 2008	Kitt Peak	Spacewatch	·	1.4 km	MPC · JPL
598488	2008 TX_{196}	—	October 2, 2008	Kitt Peak	Spacewatch	·	850 m	MPC · JPL
598489	2008 TW_{203}	—	August 8, 2012	Haleakala	Pan-STARRS 1	EUP	3.6 km	MPC · JPL
598490	2008 TZ_{203}	—	October 2, 2008	Mount Lemmon	Mount Lemmon Survey	L4	7.8 km	MPC · JPL
598491	2008 TS_{209}	—	October 9, 2008	Mount Lemmon	Mount Lemmon Survey	H	410 m	MPC · JPL
598492	2008 TF_{211}	—	October 2, 2008	Kitt Peak	Spacewatch	L4	7.8 km	MPC · JPL
598493	2008 TG_{213}	—	January 19, 2012	Kitt Peak	Spacewatch	L4	8.2 km	MPC · JPL
598494	2008 TX_{213}	—	August 24, 2008	Kitt Peak	Spacewatch	L4	6.8 km	MPC · JPL
598495	2008 TV_{214}	—	April 5, 2011	Kitt Peak	Spacewatch	·	1.3 km	MPC · JPL
598496	2008 TJ_{215}	—	October 3, 2008	Mount Lemmon	Mount Lemmon Survey	·	1.1 km	MPC · JPL
598497	2008 TP_{215}	—	October 27, 2017	Haleakala	Pan-STARRS 1	·	1.2 km	MPC · JPL
598498	2008 TP_{216}	—	October 1, 2008	Mount Lemmon	Mount Lemmon Survey	·	3.4 km	MPC · JPL
598499	2008 TO_{217}	—	October 3, 2008	Mount Lemmon	Mount Lemmon Survey	·	980 m	MPC · JPL
598500	2008 TF_{218}	—	October 10, 2008	Mount Lemmon	Mount Lemmon Survey	L4	6.8 km	MPC · JPL

== 598501–598600 ==
back to top

Designation			Discovery			Properties		Ref
Permanent	Provisional	Named after	Date	Site	Discoverer(s)	Category	Diam.	Ref
598501	2008 TV_{220}	—	October 9, 2008	Mount Lemmon	Mount Lemmon Survey	L4	7.7 km	MPC · JPL
598502	2008 TR_{221}	—	October 6, 2008	Mount Lemmon	Mount Lemmon Survey	·	730 m	MPC · JPL
598503	2008 TD_{223}	—	October 10, 2008	Mount Lemmon	Mount Lemmon Survey	L4	7.6 km	MPC · JPL
598504	2008 TL_{224}	—	October 10, 2008	Mount Lemmon	Mount Lemmon Survey	·	2.6 km	MPC · JPL
598505	2008 TN_{225}	—	October 1, 2008	Mount Lemmon	Mount Lemmon Survey	L4	7.9 km	MPC · JPL
598506	2008 TD_{226}	—	October 8, 2008	Mount Lemmon	Mount Lemmon Survey	·	2.3 km	MPC · JPL
598507	2008 TC_{228}	—	October 7, 2008	Mount Lemmon	Mount Lemmon Survey	GEF	1.2 km	MPC · JPL
598508	2008 TZ_{229}	—	October 10, 2008	Mount Lemmon	Mount Lemmon Survey	·	1.1 km	MPC · JPL
598509	2008 UL_{17}	—	March 29, 2004	Kitt Peak	Spacewatch	·	560 m	MPC · JPL
598510	2008 UU_{21}	—	January 31, 2006	Kitt Peak	Spacewatch	·	1.4 km	MPC · JPL
598511	2008 UJ_{46}	—	October 20, 2008	Kitt Peak	Spacewatch	MAR	900 m	MPC · JPL
598512	2008 UT_{57}	—	October 21, 2008	Kitt Peak	Spacewatch	·	970 m	MPC · JPL
598513	2008 UB_{78}	—	October 21, 2008	Kitt Peak	Spacewatch	·	520 m	MPC · JPL
598514	2008 UW_{78}	—	September 21, 1995	Kitt Peak	Spacewatch	·	1.2 km	MPC · JPL
598515	2008 UJ_{85}	—	October 23, 2008	Mount Lemmon	Mount Lemmon Survey	·	3.1 km	MPC · JPL
598516	2008 UZ_{90}	—	October 25, 2008	Sandlot	G. Hug	·	2.7 km	MPC · JPL
598517	2008 UD_{103}	—	September 25, 2008	Kitt Peak	Spacewatch	·	1.2 km	MPC · JPL
598518	2008 UL_{108}	—	September 24, 2008	Kitt Peak	Spacewatch	H	390 m	MPC · JPL
598519	2008 UZ_{113}	—	October 22, 2008	Kitt Peak	Spacewatch	V	560 m	MPC · JPL
598520	2008 UJ_{118}	—	October 22, 2008	Kitt Peak	Spacewatch	EUN	1.0 km	MPC · JPL
598521	2008 UC_{120}	—	October 22, 2008	Kitt Peak	Spacewatch	·	1.1 km	MPC · JPL
598522	2008 UR_{122}	—	October 22, 2008	Kitt Peak	Spacewatch	·	650 m	MPC · JPL
598523	2008 UR_{134}	—	April 9, 2002	Palomar	NEAT	·	1.5 km	MPC · JPL
598524	2008 UH_{150}	—	April 14, 2007	Kitt Peak	Spacewatch	·	1.2 km	MPC · JPL
598525	2008 UV_{167}	—	March 26, 2007	Mount Lemmon	Mount Lemmon Survey	·	610 m	MPC · JPL
598526	2008 UP_{170}	—	October 8, 2008	Kitt Peak	Spacewatch	·	1.1 km	MPC · JPL
598527	2008 UU_{180}	—	October 24, 2008	Kitt Peak	Spacewatch	3:2 · SHU	3.7 km	MPC · JPL
598528	2008 UL_{192}	—	October 25, 2008	Kitt Peak	Spacewatch	·	2.2 km	MPC · JPL
598529	2008 UL_{201}	—	October 20, 2008	Kitt Peak	Spacewatch	·	1.5 km	MPC · JPL
598530	2008 UK_{209}	—	October 23, 2008	Kitt Peak	Spacewatch	·	1.2 km	MPC · JPL
598531	2008 UM_{215}	—	October 24, 2008	Kitt Peak	Spacewatch	·	1.4 km	MPC · JPL
598532	2008 UE_{235}	—	October 26, 2008	Mount Lemmon	Mount Lemmon Survey	·	970 m	MPC · JPL
598533	2008 UQ_{238}	—	October 26, 2008	Kitt Peak	Spacewatch	HNS	920 m	MPC · JPL
598534	2008 UY_{244}	—	October 26, 2008	Kitt Peak	Spacewatch	HNS	1.2 km	MPC · JPL
598535	2008 UM_{266}	—	October 28, 2008	Kitt Peak	Spacewatch	HOF	1.8 km	MPC · JPL
598536	2008 UJ_{271}	—	October 28, 2008	Kitt Peak	Spacewatch	·	1.3 km	MPC · JPL
598537	2008 UL_{273}	—	October 28, 2008	Mount Lemmon	Mount Lemmon Survey	(194)	1.4 km	MPC · JPL
598538	2008 UL_{275}	—	October 28, 2008	Kitt Peak	Spacewatch	·	1.4 km	MPC · JPL
598539	2008 UN_{286}	—	October 8, 2008	Kitt Peak	Spacewatch	·	1.2 km	MPC · JPL
598540	2008 UX_{287}	—	October 21, 2008	Kitt Peak	Spacewatch	·	1.2 km	MPC · JPL
598541	2008 UQ_{290}	—	October 28, 2008	Kitt Peak	Spacewatch	·	1.9 km	MPC · JPL
598542	2008 UL_{291}	—	October 8, 2008	Catalina	CSS	H	330 m	MPC · JPL
598543	2008 UM_{293}	—	April 26, 2006	Cerro Tololo	Deep Ecliptic Survey	·	1.8 km	MPC · JPL
598544	2008 UX_{293}	—	April 2, 2006	Kitt Peak	Spacewatch	HNS	860 m	MPC · JPL
598545	2008 UR_{319}	—	October 31, 2008	Mount Lemmon	Mount Lemmon Survey	·	1.3 km	MPC · JPL
598546	2008 UJ_{341}	—	August 24, 2003	Palomar	NEAT	·	2.6 km	MPC · JPL
598547	2008 UB_{366}	—	November 9, 2013	Mount Lemmon	Mount Lemmon Survey	·	1.4 km	MPC · JPL
598548	2008 UN_{367}	—	October 24, 2008	Catalina	CSS	·	1.1 km	MPC · JPL
598549	2008 UQ_{373}	—	October 9, 2008	Mount Lemmon	Mount Lemmon Survey	ADE	1.7 km	MPC · JPL
598550	2008 UV_{373}	—	December 17, 1999	Kitt Peak	Spacewatch	L4	7.4 km	MPC · JPL
598551	2008 UW_{375}	—	October 28, 2008	Kitt Peak	Spacewatch	H	370 m	MPC · JPL
598552	2008 UF_{376}	—	April 18, 2015	Haleakala	Pan-STARRS 1	·	1.2 km	MPC · JPL
598553	2008 UG_{376}	—	February 26, 2014	Catalina	CSS	·	1.3 km	MPC · JPL
598554	2008 UB_{377}	—	October 28, 2008	Kitt Peak	Spacewatch	EUN	1.1 km	MPC · JPL
598555	2008 UH_{379}	—	October 29, 2008	Mount Lemmon	Mount Lemmon Survey	·	1.3 km	MPC · JPL
598556	2008 UH_{391}	—	December 31, 2013	Kitt Peak	Spacewatch	·	1.3 km	MPC · JPL
598557	2008 UO_{395}	—	January 16, 2011	Mount Lemmon	Mount Lemmon Survey	·	3.1 km	MPC · JPL
598558	2008 UR_{395}	—	October 29, 2008	Mount Lemmon	Mount Lemmon Survey	·	1.1 km	MPC · JPL
598559	2008 UY_{395}	—	April 25, 2015	Haleakala	Pan-STARRS 1	·	1.2 km	MPC · JPL
598560	2008 UE_{399}	—	February 14, 2013	Haleakala	Pan-STARRS 1	L4	7.3 km	MPC · JPL
598561	2008 UM_{400}	—	October 28, 2008	Kitt Peak	Spacewatch	·	1.2 km	MPC · JPL
598562	2008 UV_{404}	—	October 29, 2008	Kitt Peak	Spacewatch	·	1.3 km	MPC · JPL
598563	2008 UY_{404}	—	October 24, 2008	Kitt Peak	Spacewatch	·	1.4 km	MPC · JPL
598564	2008 UF_{406}	—	October 28, 2008	Kitt Peak	Spacewatch	·	970 m	MPC · JPL
598565	2008 UM_{406}	—	October 27, 2008	Mount Lemmon	Mount Lemmon Survey	MIS	2.3 km	MPC · JPL
598566	2008 UV_{409}	—	October 20, 2008	Kitt Peak	Spacewatch	·	1.4 km	MPC · JPL
598567	2008 UR_{413}	—	October 25, 2008	Mount Lemmon	Mount Lemmon Survey	KOR	960 m	MPC · JPL
598568	2008 VM_{2}	—	October 26, 2008	Kitt Peak	Spacewatch	·	460 m	MPC · JPL
598569	2008 VS_{5}	—	September 26, 2008	Bergisch Gladbach	W. Bickel	EUN	1.4 km	MPC · JPL
598570	2008 VT_{10}	—	November 2, 2008	Mount Lemmon	Mount Lemmon Survey	VER	2.2 km	MPC · JPL
598571	2008 VG_{12}	—	January 22, 2006	Mount Lemmon	Mount Lemmon Survey	·	560 m	MPC · JPL
598572	2008 VV_{13}	—	December 3, 2005	Mauna Kea	A. Boattini	·	1.1 km	MPC · JPL
598573	2008 VW_{25}	—	October 1, 2008	Kitt Peak	Spacewatch	·	750 m	MPC · JPL
598574	2008 VJ_{26}	—	July 4, 2003	Kitt Peak	Spacewatch	EUN	1.2 km	MPC · JPL
598575	2008 VS_{29}	—	November 2, 2008	Mount Lemmon	Mount Lemmon Survey	EUN	1.4 km	MPC · JPL
598576	2008 VA_{30}	—	October 20, 2008	Kitt Peak	Spacewatch	·	3.1 km	MPC · JPL
598577	2008 VW_{30}	—	October 24, 2008	Catalina	CSS	·	1.4 km	MPC · JPL
598578	2008 VF_{31}	—	November 2, 2008	Mount Lemmon	Mount Lemmon Survey	·	450 m	MPC · JPL
598579	2008 VE_{36}	—	October 6, 2008	Mount Lemmon	Mount Lemmon Survey	·	1.4 km	MPC · JPL
598580	2008 VM_{41}	—	September 28, 2008	Mount Lemmon	Mount Lemmon Survey	DOR	1.9 km	MPC · JPL
598581	2008 VN_{49}	—	November 4, 2008	Bergisch Gladbach	W. Bickel	·	1.1 km	MPC · JPL
598582	2008 VY_{54}	—	September 24, 2008	Kitt Peak	Spacewatch	·	960 m	MPC · JPL
598583	2008 VY_{57}	—	October 25, 2008	Socorro	LINEAR	·	2.1 km	MPC · JPL
598584	2008 VP_{58}	—	September 23, 2008	Kitt Peak	Spacewatch	·	1.4 km	MPC · JPL
598585	2008 VO_{63}	—	November 8, 2008	Mount Lemmon	Mount Lemmon Survey	·	1.8 km	MPC · JPL
598586	2008 VS_{81}	—	November 3, 2008	Catalina	CSS	H	470 m	MPC · JPL
598587	2008 VR_{82}	—	November 2, 2008	Mount Lemmon	Mount Lemmon Survey	·	1.4 km	MPC · JPL
598588	2008 VE_{83}	—	October 20, 2012	Haleakala	Pan-STARRS 1	EUN	1.0 km	MPC · JPL
598589	2008 VJ_{83}	—	November 7, 2008	Mount Lemmon	Mount Lemmon Survey	·	1.1 km	MPC · JPL
598590	2008 VJ_{84}	—	February 15, 2013	Haleakala	Pan-STARRS 1	·	530 m	MPC · JPL
598591	2008 VV_{87}	—	November 7, 2008	Mount Lemmon	Mount Lemmon Survey	·	1.5 km	MPC · JPL
598592	2008 VH_{89}	—	October 8, 2012	Mount Lemmon	Mount Lemmon Survey	EUN	1.1 km	MPC · JPL
598593	2008 VD_{91}	—	October 26, 2008	Mount Lemmon	Mount Lemmon Survey	·	1.3 km	MPC · JPL
598594	2008 VE_{98}	—	November 7, 2008	Mount Lemmon	Mount Lemmon Survey	·	650 m	MPC · JPL
598595	2008 VK_{100}	—	November 2, 2008	Mount Lemmon	Mount Lemmon Survey	·	1.2 km	MPC · JPL
598596	2008 VS_{100}	—	November 2, 2008	Mount Lemmon	Mount Lemmon Survey	·	630 m	MPC · JPL
598597	2008 VE_{102}	—	September 10, 2002	Palomar	NEAT	·	2.1 km	MPC · JPL
598598	2008 VP_{103}	—	November 7, 2008	Mount Lemmon	Mount Lemmon Survey	EOS	1.7 km	MPC · JPL
598599	2008 VU_{103}	—	November 2, 2008	Mount Lemmon	Mount Lemmon Survey	·	1.3 km	MPC · JPL
598600	2008 WM_{1}	—	November 17, 2008	Kitt Peak	Spacewatch	BAR	1.1 km	MPC · JPL

== 598601–598700 ==
back to top

Designation			Discovery			Properties		Ref
Permanent	Provisional	Named after	Date	Site	Discoverer(s)	Category	Diam.	Ref
598601	2008 WV_{20}	—	April 26, 2006	Cerro Tololo	Deep Ecliptic Survey	(12739)	1.4 km	MPC · JPL
598602	2008 WX_{20}	—	November 17, 2008	Kitt Peak	Spacewatch	·	1.4 km	MPC · JPL
598603	2008 WT_{21}	—	November 17, 2008	Kitt Peak	Spacewatch	·	1.3 km	MPC · JPL
598604	2008 WD_{37}	—	November 17, 2008	Kitt Peak	Spacewatch	·	1.0 km	MPC · JPL
598605	2008 WZ_{43}	—	November 17, 2008	Kitt Peak	Spacewatch	·	1.1 km	MPC · JPL
598606	2008 WG_{79}	—	November 20, 2008	Kitt Peak	Spacewatch	·	1.7 km	MPC · JPL
598607	2008 WE_{81}	—	October 26, 2008	Kitt Peak	Spacewatch	HNS	1.0 km	MPC · JPL
598608	2008 WS_{84}	—	November 20, 2008	Kitt Peak	Spacewatch	·	2.0 km	MPC · JPL
598609	2008 WW_{86}	—	October 1, 2008	Mount Lemmon	Mount Lemmon Survey	·	1.6 km	MPC · JPL
598610	2008 WS_{88}	—	November 21, 2008	Kitt Peak	Spacewatch	·	600 m	MPC · JPL
598611	2008 WG_{95}	—	November 21, 2008	Cerro Burek	Burek, Cerro	H	560 m	MPC · JPL
598612	2008 WK_{104}	—	November 19, 2008	Kitt Peak	Spacewatch	·	950 m	MPC · JPL
598613	2008 WK_{115}	—	November 30, 2008	Kitt Peak	Spacewatch	GEF	980 m	MPC · JPL
598614	2008 WT_{124}	—	November 28, 2008	Cerro Burek	Burek, Cerro	·	2.0 km	MPC · JPL
598615	2008 WJ_{127}	—	November 30, 2008	Mount Lemmon	Mount Lemmon Survey	·	1.6 km	MPC · JPL
598616	2008 WQ_{135}	—	March 25, 2006	Kitt Peak	Spacewatch	·	1.8 km	MPC · JPL
598617	2008 WG_{144}	—	November 24, 2008	Mount Lemmon	Mount Lemmon Survey	·	1.9 km	MPC · JPL
598618	2008 WL_{144}	—	November 30, 2008	Kitt Peak	Spacewatch	·	1.8 km	MPC · JPL
598619	2008 WV_{144}	—	November 20, 2008	Kitt Peak	Spacewatch	·	1.3 km	MPC · JPL
598620	2008 WQ_{146}	—	November 18, 2008	Kitt Peak	Spacewatch	·	1.4 km	MPC · JPL
598621	2008 WO_{147}	—	November 19, 2008	Mount Lemmon	Mount Lemmon Survey	·	1.7 km	MPC · JPL
598622	2008 WA_{148}	—	October 10, 2012	Kitt Peak	Spacewatch	·	1.5 km	MPC · JPL
598623	2008 WJ_{150}	—	May 21, 2015	Haleakala	Pan-STARRS 1	·	1.2 km	MPC · JPL
598624	2008 WM_{150}	—	November 18, 2008	Kitt Peak	Spacewatch	·	1.4 km	MPC · JPL
598625	2008 WW_{156}	—	November 20, 2008	Mount Lemmon	Mount Lemmon Survey	·	2.6 km	MPC · JPL
598626	2008 WL_{162}	—	November 20, 2008	Kitt Peak	Spacewatch	·	1.2 km	MPC · JPL
598627	2008 WP_{163}	—	November 24, 2008	Kitt Peak	Spacewatch	·	2.9 km	MPC · JPL
598628	2008 WT_{163}	—	November 23, 2008	Kitt Peak	Spacewatch	·	1.8 km	MPC · JPL
598629	2008 XQ_{6}	—	December 4, 2008	Socorro	LINEAR	H	400 m	MPC · JPL
598630	2008 XY_{9}	—	December 2, 2008	Mount Lemmon	Mount Lemmon Survey	MAR	880 m	MPC · JPL
598631	2008 XX_{10}	—	September 10, 2007	Mount Lemmon	Mount Lemmon Survey	3:2	5.2 km	MPC · JPL
598632	2008 XB_{19}	—	December 1, 2008	Kitt Peak	Spacewatch	·	1.4 km	MPC · JPL
598633	2008 XE_{20}	—	December 20, 2004	Mount Lemmon	Mount Lemmon Survey	·	1.7 km	MPC · JPL
598634	2008 XU_{25}	—	December 4, 2008	Mount Lemmon	Mount Lemmon Survey	·	1.5 km	MPC · JPL
598635	2008 XT_{31}	—	October 30, 2008	Kitt Peak	Spacewatch	·	1.5 km	MPC · JPL
598636	2008 XX_{53}	—	December 1, 2008	Kitt Peak	Spacewatch	·	2.8 km	MPC · JPL
598637	2008 XP_{57}	—	December 4, 2008	Kitt Peak	Spacewatch	·	690 m	MPC · JPL
598638	2008 XC_{58}	—	June 6, 2011	Haleakala	Pan-STARRS 1	(5)	950 m	MPC · JPL
598639	2008 XO_{58}	—	October 3, 2011	XuYi	PMO NEO Survey Program	V	590 m	MPC · JPL
598640	2008 XX_{58}	—	December 1, 2008	Kitt Peak	Spacewatch	·	1.4 km	MPC · JPL
598641	2008 XB_{59}	—	November 13, 2012	Mount Lemmon	Mount Lemmon Survey	·	1.3 km	MPC · JPL
598642	2008 XC_{62}	—	November 18, 2008	Kitt Peak	Spacewatch	·	1.5 km	MPC · JPL
598643	2008 XO_{62}	—	November 7, 2008	Mount Lemmon	Mount Lemmon Survey	·	1.6 km	MPC · JPL
598644	2008 XX_{63}	—	December 3, 2008	Mount Lemmon	Mount Lemmon Survey	·	1.1 km	MPC · JPL
598645	2008 XF_{67}	—	December 7, 2008	Kitt Peak	Spacewatch	(5)	1.1 km	MPC · JPL
598646	2008 YR	—	December 19, 2008	Calar Alto	F. Hormuth	·	1.1 km	MPC · JPL
598647	2008 YE_{2}	—	December 21, 2008	Socorro	LINEAR	H	500 m	MPC · JPL
598648	2008 YW_{4}	—	December 21, 2008	Piszkéstető	K. Sárneczky	(194)	1.4 km	MPC · JPL
598649	2008 YW_{46}	—	December 29, 2008	Mount Lemmon	Mount Lemmon Survey	·	1.6 km	MPC · JPL
598650	2008 YU_{47}	—	December 29, 2008	Kitt Peak	Spacewatch	·	1.6 km	MPC · JPL
598651	2008 YK_{51}	—	December 29, 2008	Mount Lemmon	Mount Lemmon Survey	·	610 m	MPC · JPL
598652	2008 YD_{52}	—	October 8, 2007	Mount Lemmon	Mount Lemmon Survey	·	1.5 km	MPC · JPL
598653	2008 YL_{56}	—	October 10, 2007	Mount Lemmon	Mount Lemmon Survey	AGN	1.1 km	MPC · JPL
598654	2008 YK_{57}	—	August 28, 2003	Haleakala	NEAT	·	1.9 km	MPC · JPL
598655	2008 YY_{58}	—	December 22, 2003	Kitt Peak	Spacewatch	·	1.8 km	MPC · JPL
598656	2008 YF_{67}	—	December 30, 2008	Mount Lemmon	Mount Lemmon Survey	·	1.8 km	MPC · JPL
598657	2008 YS_{70}	—	December 29, 2008	Mount Lemmon	Mount Lemmon Survey	AGN	1.3 km	MPC · JPL
598658	2008 YT_{77}	—	December 30, 2008	Mount Lemmon	Mount Lemmon Survey	·	1.5 km	MPC · JPL
598659	2008 YP_{78}	—	December 30, 2008	Mount Lemmon	Mount Lemmon Survey	·	1.6 km	MPC · JPL
598660	2008 YV_{79}	—	December 30, 2008	Mount Lemmon	Mount Lemmon Survey	·	1.3 km	MPC · JPL
598661	2008 YO_{82}	—	December 31, 2008	Kitt Peak	Spacewatch	·	2.7 km	MPC · JPL
598662	2008 YB_{83}	—	December 31, 2008	Kitt Peak	Spacewatch	·	1.4 km	MPC · JPL
598663	2008 YA_{84}	—	December 31, 2008	Kitt Peak	Spacewatch	·	3.6 km	MPC · JPL
598664	2008 YN_{91}	—	December 29, 2008	Mount Lemmon	Mount Lemmon Survey	·	2.1 km	MPC · JPL
598665	2008 YX_{116}	—	December 29, 2008	Kitt Peak	Spacewatch	HNS	900 m	MPC · JPL
598666	2008 YE_{122}	—	December 30, 2008	Kitt Peak	Spacewatch	(12739)	1.3 km	MPC · JPL
598667	2008 YT_{126}	—	December 30, 2008	Kitt Peak	Spacewatch	·	440 m	MPC · JPL
598668	2008 YF_{129}	—	October 8, 2007	Catalina	CSS	·	2.9 km	MPC · JPL
598669	2008 YS_{139}	—	December 22, 2008	Kitt Peak	Spacewatch	·	910 m	MPC · JPL
598670	2008 YW_{139}	—	December 30, 2008	Kitt Peak	Spacewatch	BAP	850 m	MPC · JPL
598671	2008 YM_{145}	—	December 30, 2008	Kitt Peak	Spacewatch	WIT	890 m	MPC · JPL
598672	2008 YY_{148}	—	January 18, 2005	Kitt Peak	Spacewatch	·	2.2 km	MPC · JPL
598673	2008 YY_{153}	—	December 21, 2008	Mount Lemmon	Mount Lemmon Survey	·	1.7 km	MPC · JPL
598674	2008 YL_{155}	—	December 22, 2008	Kitt Peak	Spacewatch	·	2.0 km	MPC · JPL
598675	2008 YN_{176}	—	June 3, 2011	Mount Lemmon	Mount Lemmon Survey	·	1.1 km	MPC · JPL
598676	2008 YO_{176}	—	December 21, 2008	Mount Lemmon	Mount Lemmon Survey	·	1.8 km	MPC · JPL
598677	2008 YU_{176}	—	October 17, 2012	Haleakala	Pan-STARRS 1	·	2.0 km	MPC · JPL
598678	2008 YT_{177}	—	February 26, 2014	Haleakala	Pan-STARRS 1	·	1.5 km	MPC · JPL
598679	2008 YE_{178}	—	December 21, 2008	Catalina	CSS	H	440 m	MPC · JPL
598680	2008 YF_{178}	—	November 24, 2008	Kitt Peak	Spacewatch	·	1.1 km	MPC · JPL
598681	2008 YS_{178}	—	August 30, 2016	Haleakala	Pan-STARRS 1	EUN	1.1 km	MPC · JPL
598682	2008 YH_{180}	—	December 31, 2008	Mount Lemmon	Mount Lemmon Survey	·	1.2 km	MPC · JPL
598683	2008 YD_{182}	—	October 16, 2012	Mount Lemmon	Mount Lemmon Survey	AEO	880 m	MPC · JPL
598684	2008 YG_{185}	—	October 18, 2012	Haleakala	Pan-STARRS 1	·	1.1 km	MPC · JPL
598685	2008 YZ_{185}	—	April 8, 2013	Kitt Peak	Spacewatch	·	630 m	MPC · JPL
598686	2008 YZ_{187}	—	December 21, 2008	Kitt Peak	Spacewatch	AGN	970 m	MPC · JPL
598687	2009 AK_{4}	—	January 1, 2009	Kitt Peak	Spacewatch	·	1.4 km	MPC · JPL
598688	2009 AR_{5}	—	December 4, 2008	Mount Lemmon	Mount Lemmon Survey	·	1.3 km	MPC · JPL
598689	2009 AU_{6}	—	September 13, 2007	Mount Lemmon	Mount Lemmon Survey	·	1.6 km	MPC · JPL
598690	2009 AQ_{12}	—	September 13, 2007	Mount Lemmon	Mount Lemmon Survey	·	1.3 km	MPC · JPL
598691	2009 AV_{18}	—	April 2, 2006	Mount Lemmon	Mount Lemmon Survey	·	600 m	MPC · JPL
598692	2009 AW_{20}	—	January 2, 2009	Mount Lemmon	Mount Lemmon Survey	HNS	1.1 km	MPC · JPL
598693	2009 AK_{24}	—	January 3, 2009	Kitt Peak	Spacewatch	·	2.3 km	MPC · JPL
598694	2009 AP_{26}	—	January 2, 2009	Kitt Peak	Spacewatch	·	1.8 km	MPC · JPL
598695	2009 AT_{27}	—	January 2, 2009	Kitt Peak	Spacewatch	(5)	880 m	MPC · JPL
598696	2009 AJ_{29}	—	May 24, 2006	Kitt Peak	Spacewatch	·	1.9 km	MPC · JPL
598697	2009 AA_{41}	—	January 2, 2009	Kitt Peak	Spacewatch	(1338) (FLO)	490 m	MPC · JPL
598698	2009 AO_{41}	—	January 21, 2009	Mount Lemmon	Mount Lemmon Survey	ADE	1.9 km	MPC · JPL
598699	2009 AK_{49}	—	January 1, 2009	Kitt Peak	Spacewatch	·	1.5 km	MPC · JPL
598700	2009 AC_{52}	—	October 22, 2003	Kitt Peak	Spacewatch	·	1.1 km	MPC · JPL

== 598701–598800 ==
back to top

Designation			Discovery			Properties		Ref
Permanent	Provisional	Named after	Date	Site	Discoverer(s)	Category	Diam.	Ref
598701	2009 AY_{52}	—	April 30, 2011	Mount Lemmon	Mount Lemmon Survey	·	1.9 km	MPC · JPL
598702	2009 AG_{53}	—	March 19, 2013	Haleakala	Pan-STARRS 1	·	540 m	MPC · JPL
598703	2009 AC_{54}	—	January 1, 2009	Mount Lemmon	Mount Lemmon Survey	·	1.5 km	MPC · JPL
598704	2009 AJ_{54}	—	March 28, 2015	Haleakala	Pan-STARRS 1	TIN	1.0 km	MPC · JPL
598705	2009 AW_{54}	—	June 24, 1995	Kitt Peak	Spacewatch	·	1.3 km	MPC · JPL
598706	2009 AE_{55}	—	January 10, 2014	Mount Lemmon	Mount Lemmon Survey	·	1.9 km	MPC · JPL
598707	2009 AG_{55}	—	January 2, 2009	Mount Lemmon	Mount Lemmon Survey	·	1.4 km	MPC · JPL
598708	2009 AK_{55}	—	January 2, 2009	Kitt Peak	Spacewatch	HOF	2.1 km	MPC · JPL
598709	2009 AL_{58}	—	January 1, 2009	Kitt Peak	Spacewatch	·	1.6 km	MPC · JPL
598710	2009 AS_{60}	—	January 2, 2009	Kitt Peak	Spacewatch	·	1.3 km	MPC · JPL
598711	2009 BY_{13}	—	December 31, 2008	Mount Lemmon	Mount Lemmon Survey	PHO	960 m	MPC · JPL
598712	2009 BM_{17}	—	January 17, 2009	Mount Lemmon	Mount Lemmon Survey	H	490 m	MPC · JPL
598713	2009 BW_{23}	—	January 17, 2009	Kitt Peak	Spacewatch	·	1.5 km	MPC · JPL
598714	2009 BW_{36}	—	January 2, 2009	Kitt Peak	Spacewatch	·	490 m	MPC · JPL
598715	2009 BB_{37}	—	January 16, 2009	Kitt Peak	Spacewatch	AST	1.5 km	MPC · JPL
598716	2009 BA_{50}	—	October 1, 2003	Anderson Mesa	LONEOS	EUN	1.2 km	MPC · JPL
598717	2009 BW_{53}	—	January 1, 2009	Mount Lemmon	Mount Lemmon Survey	TIR	1.8 km	MPC · JPL
598718	2009 BY_{53}	—	January 16, 2009	Mount Lemmon	Mount Lemmon Survey	·	1.8 km	MPC · JPL
598719 Alegalli	2009 BO_{64}	Alegalli	January 20, 2009	Kitt Peak	Spacewatch	fast	1.9 km	MPC · JPL
598720	2009 BN_{67}	—	January 20, 2009	Kitt Peak	Spacewatch	·	430 m	MPC · JPL
598721	2009 BF_{79}	—	January 29, 2009	Siding Spring	SSS	·	1.6 km	MPC · JPL
598722	2009 BQ_{85}	—	January 15, 2009	Kitt Peak	Spacewatch	·	590 m	MPC · JPL
598723	2009 BC_{87}	—	January 25, 2009	Kitt Peak	Spacewatch	·	640 m	MPC · JPL
598724	2009 BH_{87}	—	September 14, 2007	Mount Lemmon	Mount Lemmon Survey	·	1.4 km	MPC · JPL
598725	2009 BO_{98}	—	November 23, 2008	Mount Lemmon	Mount Lemmon Survey	AGN	1.0 km	MPC · JPL
598726	2009 BJ_{99}	—	January 29, 2009	Mount Lemmon	Mount Lemmon Survey	·	2.0 km	MPC · JPL
598727	2009 BQ_{101}	—	January 29, 2009	Mount Lemmon	Mount Lemmon Survey	EOS	1.6 km	MPC · JPL
598728	2009 BW_{105}	—	January 25, 2009	Kitt Peak	Spacewatch	·	1.4 km	MPC · JPL
598729	2009 BE_{113}	—	February 3, 2009	Kitt Peak	Spacewatch	·	1.5 km	MPC · JPL
598730	2009 BZ_{115}	—	January 16, 2009	Mount Lemmon	Mount Lemmon Survey	·	530 m	MPC · JPL
598731	2009 BO_{116}	—	January 29, 2009	Kitt Peak	Spacewatch	·	1.8 km	MPC · JPL
598732	2009 BG_{131}	—	January 31, 2009	Mount Lemmon	Mount Lemmon Survey	·	1.8 km	MPC · JPL
598733	2009 BT_{140}	—	December 31, 2008	Mount Lemmon	Mount Lemmon Survey	·	1.6 km	MPC · JPL
598734	2009 BK_{141}	—	January 20, 2009	Kitt Peak	Spacewatch	·	1.9 km	MPC · JPL
598735	2009 BV_{146}	—	October 16, 2007	Kitt Peak	Spacewatch	(13314)	1.5 km	MPC · JPL
598736	2009 BT_{153}	—	April 2, 2006	Kitt Peak	Spacewatch	·	540 m	MPC · JPL
598737	2009 BE_{160}	—	January 30, 2009	Mount Lemmon	Mount Lemmon Survey	H	590 m	MPC · JPL
598738	2009 BC_{161}	—	September 20, 1995	Kitt Peak	Spacewatch	·	1.2 km	MPC · JPL
598739	2009 BL_{168}	—	January 24, 2009	Cerro Burek	Burek, Cerro	(2076)	640 m	MPC · JPL
598740	2009 BR_{170}	—	January 16, 2009	Kitt Peak	Spacewatch	·	1.4 km	MPC · JPL
598741	2009 BC_{178}	—	January 31, 2009	Mount Lemmon	Mount Lemmon Survey	T_{j} (2.98)	3.0 km	MPC · JPL
598742	2009 BN_{193}	—	January 29, 2009	Mount Lemmon	Mount Lemmon Survey	·	1.7 km	MPC · JPL
598743	2009 BY_{193}	—	January 25, 2009	Kitt Peak	Spacewatch	BRA	1.4 km	MPC · JPL
598744	2009 BK_{194}	—	October 25, 2011	Haleakala	Pan-STARRS 1	·	720 m	MPC · JPL
598745	2009 BW_{194}	—	January 20, 2009	Mount Lemmon	Mount Lemmon Survey	·	1.8 km	MPC · JPL
598746	2009 BN_{196}	—	January 20, 2009	Mount Lemmon	Mount Lemmon Survey	(1547)	1.3 km	MPC · JPL
598747	2009 BP_{196}	—	March 12, 2000	Kitt Peak	Spacewatch	·	760 m	MPC · JPL
598748	2009 BK_{197}	—	January 30, 2009	Taunus	Karge, S., R. Kling	·	890 m	MPC · JPL
598749	2009 BV_{197}	—	January 20, 2009	Catalina	CSS	H	460 m	MPC · JPL
598750	2009 BX_{198}	—	March 11, 2014	Kitt Peak	Spacewatch	MRX	830 m	MPC · JPL
598751	2009 BH_{199}	—	October 9, 2016	Mount Lemmon	Mount Lemmon Survey	·	1.7 km	MPC · JPL
598752	2009 BM_{199}	—	September 4, 2011	Haleakala	Pan-STARRS 1	·	1.6 km	MPC · JPL
598753	2009 BX_{199}	—	December 5, 2016	Mount Lemmon	Mount Lemmon Survey	H	520 m	MPC · JPL
598754	2009 BK_{200}	—	January 11, 2018	Haleakala	Pan-STARRS 1	HOF	1.9 km	MPC · JPL
598755	2009 BL_{205}	—	January 18, 2009	Kitt Peak	Spacewatch	HOF	2.1 km	MPC · JPL
598756	2009 BR_{206}	—	January 31, 2009	Mount Lemmon	Mount Lemmon Survey	·	2.6 km	MPC · JPL
598757	2009 BJ_{207}	—	January 25, 2009	Kitt Peak	Spacewatch	·	2.3 km	MPC · JPL
598758	2009 BM_{207}	—	January 17, 2009	Kitt Peak	Spacewatch	·	2.0 km	MPC · JPL
598759	2009 BQ_{207}	—	January 20, 2009	Kitt Peak	Spacewatch	·	1.5 km	MPC · JPL
598760	2009 BX_{208}	—	January 18, 2009	Kitt Peak	Spacewatch	·	1.4 km	MPC · JPL
598761	2009 BT_{210}	—	January 31, 2009	Kitt Peak	Spacewatch	(5)	920 m	MPC · JPL
598762	2009 BT_{213}	—	January 25, 2009	Kitt Peak	Spacewatch	·	1.7 km	MPC · JPL
598763	2009 CE_{6}	—	January 16, 2009	Mount Lemmon	Mount Lemmon Survey	·	1.8 km	MPC · JPL
598764	2009 CW_{8}	—	April 15, 2001	Kitt Peak	Spacewatch	·	1.9 km	MPC · JPL
598765	2009 CA_{13}	—	February 1, 2009	Mount Lemmon	Mount Lemmon Survey	V	420 m	MPC · JPL
598766	2009 CY_{16}	—	February 1, 2009	Mount Lemmon	Mount Lemmon Survey	JUN	1 km	MPC · JPL
598767	2009 CJ_{17}	—	February 2, 2009	Catalina	CSS	·	650 m	MPC · JPL
598768	2009 CU_{18}	—	February 3, 2009	Mount Lemmon	Mount Lemmon Survey	·	1.6 km	MPC · JPL
598769	2009 CC_{24}	—	February 1, 2009	Kitt Peak	Spacewatch	·	1.6 km	MPC · JPL
598770	2009 CC_{27}	—	February 1, 2009	Kitt Peak	Spacewatch	·	440 m	MPC · JPL
598771	2009 CA_{31}	—	February 1, 2009	Kitt Peak	Spacewatch	·	1.8 km	MPC · JPL
598772	2009 CN_{37}	—	February 4, 2009	Mount Lemmon	Mount Lemmon Survey	·	1.7 km	MPC · JPL
598773	2009 CB_{41}	—	January 18, 2009	Kitt Peak	Spacewatch	·	1.4 km	MPC · JPL
598774	2009 CG_{48}	—	February 1, 2009	Kitt Peak	Spacewatch	·	580 m	MPC · JPL
598775	2009 CZ_{65}	—	January 3, 2009	Mount Lemmon	Mount Lemmon Survey	·	1.7 km	MPC · JPL
598776	2009 CP_{67}	—	February 3, 2009	Kitt Peak	Spacewatch	·	1.8 km	MPC · JPL
598777	2009 CX_{67}	—	February 3, 2009	Kitt Peak	Spacewatch	·	1.7 km	MPC · JPL
598778	2009 CF_{68}	—	February 1, 2009	Kitt Peak	Spacewatch	·	1.6 km	MPC · JPL
598779	2009 CK_{68}	—	February 2, 2009	Kitt Peak	Spacewatch	H	410 m	MPC · JPL
598780	2009 CN_{68}	—	May 3, 2013	Mount Lemmon	Mount Lemmon Survey	·	840 m	MPC · JPL
598781	2009 CQ_{68}	—	October 20, 2014	Mount Lemmon	Mount Lemmon Survey	·	650 m	MPC · JPL
598782	2009 CB_{69}	—	January 14, 2016	Haleakala	Pan-STARRS 1	·	740 m	MPC · JPL
598783	2009 CQ_{69}	—	January 18, 2009	Kitt Peak	Spacewatch	·	1.8 km	MPC · JPL
598784	2009 CW_{69}	—	January 4, 2016	Haleakala	Pan-STARRS 1	·	780 m	MPC · JPL
598785	2009 CH_{71}	—	July 3, 2011	Mount Lemmon	Mount Lemmon Survey	·	1.8 km	MPC · JPL
598786	2009 CA_{74}	—	January 21, 2015	Haleakala	Pan-STARRS 1	·	2.6 km	MPC · JPL
598787	2009 CH_{74}	—	February 3, 2009	Kitt Peak	Spacewatch	·	2.1 km	MPC · JPL
598788	2009 CT_{76}	—	February 1, 2009	Kitt Peak	Spacewatch	HOF	1.9 km	MPC · JPL
598789	2009 CF_{78}	—	February 2, 2009	Mount Lemmon	Mount Lemmon Survey	·	1.8 km	MPC · JPL
598790	2009 DH_{3}	—	February 5, 2009	Kitt Peak	Spacewatch	H	410 m	MPC · JPL
598791	2009 DA_{6}	—	January 1, 2009	Mount Lemmon	Mount Lemmon Survey	·	1.4 km	MPC · JPL
598792	2009 DZ_{10}	—	January 31, 2009	Kitt Peak	Spacewatch	EOS	1.6 km	MPC · JPL
598793	2009 DK_{14}	—	February 19, 2009	Mount Lemmon	Mount Lemmon Survey	·	1.8 km	MPC · JPL
598794	2009 DB_{26}	—	October 12, 2007	Mount Lemmon	Mount Lemmon Survey	·	1.7 km	MPC · JPL
598795	2009 DN_{36}	—	January 3, 2009	Mount Lemmon	Mount Lemmon Survey	·	1.5 km	MPC · JPL
598796	2009 DY_{36}	—	February 3, 2009	Kitt Peak	Spacewatch	·	1.4 km	MPC · JPL
598797	2009 DW_{40}	—	January 19, 2009	Mount Lemmon	Mount Lemmon Survey	·	810 m	MPC · JPL
598798	2009 DS_{44}	—	January 31, 2009	Mount Lemmon	Mount Lemmon Survey	·	2.0 km	MPC · JPL
598799	2009 DJ_{56}	—	February 4, 2009	Mount Lemmon	Mount Lemmon Survey	·	660 m	MPC · JPL
598800	2009 DE_{58}	—	January 15, 2004	Kitt Peak	Spacewatch	·	1.6 km	MPC · JPL

== 598801–598900 ==
back to top

Designation			Discovery			Properties		Ref
Permanent	Provisional	Named after	Date	Site	Discoverer(s)	Category	Diam.	Ref
598801	2009 DC_{64}	—	February 22, 2009	Kitt Peak	Spacewatch	·	1.6 km	MPC · JPL
598802	2009 DX_{65}	—	September 24, 2007	Kitt Peak	Spacewatch	·	1.2 km	MPC · JPL
598803	2009 DW_{67}	—	February 1, 2009	Mount Lemmon	Mount Lemmon Survey	·	2.0 km	MPC · JPL
598804	2009 DO_{72}	—	February 22, 2009	Kitt Peak	Spacewatch	·	2.8 km	MPC · JPL
598805	2009 DZ_{76}	—	January 19, 2009	Mount Lemmon	Mount Lemmon Survey	·	1.6 km	MPC · JPL
598806	2009 DT_{87}	—	February 27, 2009	Kitt Peak	Spacewatch	·	780 m	MPC · JPL
598807	2009 DK_{94}	—	February 28, 2009	Mount Lemmon	Mount Lemmon Survey	·	900 m	MPC · JPL
598808	2009 DJ_{106}	—	May 9, 2002	Palomar	NEAT	·	720 m	MPC · JPL
598809	2009 DG_{108}	—	February 24, 2009	Mount Lemmon	Mount Lemmon Survey	·	2.1 km	MPC · JPL
598810	2009 DQ_{114}	—	February 26, 2009	Calar Alto	F. Hormuth	·	650 m	MPC · JPL
598811	2009 DG_{115}	—	February 26, 2009	Catalina	CSS	·	1.5 km	MPC · JPL
598812	2009 DG_{117}	—	February 27, 2009	Kitt Peak	Spacewatch	·	740 m	MPC · JPL
598813	2009 DU_{119}	—	February 27, 2009	Kitt Peak	Spacewatch	MAS	420 m	MPC · JPL
598814	2009 DD_{122}	—	February 27, 2009	Kitt Peak	Spacewatch	·	850 m	MPC · JPL
598815	2009 DJ_{135}	—	February 19, 2009	Kitt Peak	Spacewatch	3:2	4.5 km	MPC · JPL
598816	2009 DO_{135}	—	February 26, 2009	Cerro Burek	Burek, Cerro	·	1.9 km	MPC · JPL
598817	2009 DD_{136}	—	February 26, 2009	Cerro Burek	Burek, Cerro	·	1.9 km	MPC · JPL
598818	2009 DZ_{140}	—	February 27, 2009	Catalina	CSS	526	2.6 km	MPC · JPL
598819	2009 DY_{143}	—	January 31, 2009	Kitt Peak	Spacewatch	·	940 m	MPC · JPL
598820	2009 DX_{145}	—	November 3, 2007	Kitt Peak	Spacewatch	·	1.3 km	MPC · JPL
598821	2009 DY_{145}	—	December 5, 2012	Mount Lemmon	Mount Lemmon Survey	·	1.5 km	MPC · JPL
598822	2009 DU_{146}	—	February 20, 2009	Mount Lemmon	Mount Lemmon Survey	·	1.6 km	MPC · JPL
598823	2009 DV_{146}	—	November 13, 2012	Kitt Peak	Spacewatch	·	1.5 km	MPC · JPL
598824	2009 DC_{147}	—	February 20, 2009	Kitt Peak	Spacewatch	·	2.6 km	MPC · JPL
598825	2009 DF_{147}	—	February 20, 2009	Kitt Peak	Spacewatch	·	1.6 km	MPC · JPL
598826	2009 DN_{147}	—	February 19, 2009	Kitt Peak	Spacewatch	·	1.5 km	MPC · JPL
598827	2009 DR_{147}	—	February 27, 2009	Catalina	CSS	H	460 m	MPC · JPL
598828	2009 DU_{147}	—	February 20, 2009	Mount Lemmon	Mount Lemmon Survey	(2076)	800 m	MPC · JPL
598829	2009 DA_{149}	—	July 27, 2017	Haleakala	Pan-STARRS 1	·	2.5 km	MPC · JPL
598830	2009 DC_{149}	—	January 18, 2009	Kitt Peak	Spacewatch	·	950 m	MPC · JPL
598831	2009 DV_{149}	—	February 27, 2009	Mount Lemmon	Mount Lemmon Survey	·	650 m	MPC · JPL
598832	2009 DJ_{150}	—	February 26, 2009	Kitt Peak	Spacewatch	·	2.6 km	MPC · JPL
598833	2009 DN_{151}	—	February 28, 2009	Kitt Peak	Spacewatch	·	1.4 km	MPC · JPL
598834	2009 DN_{153}	—	February 28, 2009	Kitt Peak	Spacewatch	·	2.7 km	MPC · JPL
598835	2009 DG_{154}	—	February 16, 2009	Kitt Peak	Spacewatch	·	1.7 km	MPC · JPL
598836	2009 DU_{157}	—	February 16, 2009	Catalina	CSS	·	1.1 km	MPC · JPL
598837	2009 EC_{4}	—	March 16, 2009	XuYi	PMO NEO Survey Program	H	470 m	MPC · JPL
598838	2009 ET_{6}	—	February 3, 2009	Mount Lemmon	Mount Lemmon Survey	·	1.2 km	MPC · JPL
598839	2009 EJ_{11}	—	March 2, 2009	Mount Lemmon	Mount Lemmon Survey	·	2.1 km	MPC · JPL
598840	2009 EA_{12}	—	March 2, 2009	Mount Lemmon	Mount Lemmon Survey	·	910 m	MPC · JPL
598841	2009 EA_{18}	—	February 19, 2009	Kitt Peak	Spacewatch	NYS	720 m	MPC · JPL
598842	2009 EF_{18}	—	February 20, 2009	Mount Lemmon	Mount Lemmon Survey	·	470 m	MPC · JPL
598843	2009 EZ_{30}	—	March 15, 2009	Kitt Peak	Spacewatch	NYS	1.0 km	MPC · JPL
598844	2009 EM_{32}	—	June 18, 2013	Haleakala	Pan-STARRS 1	·	730 m	MPC · JPL
598845	2009 EN_{33}	—	May 18, 2015	Haleakala	Pan-STARRS 1	·	1.5 km	MPC · JPL
598846	2009 EV_{33}	—	February 14, 2013	Kitt Peak	Spacewatch	·	1.0 km	MPC · JPL
598847	2009 EQ_{34}	—	October 2, 2010	Kitt Peak	Spacewatch	·	800 m	MPC · JPL
598848	2009 EF_{35}	—	May 16, 2013	Haleakala	Pan-STARRS 1	·	720 m	MPC · JPL
598849	2009 EX_{38}	—	March 3, 2009	Mount Lemmon	Mount Lemmon Survey	NYS	860 m	MPC · JPL
598850	2009 EE_{39}	—	March 3, 2009	Mount Lemmon	Mount Lemmon Survey	·	1.4 km	MPC · JPL
598851	2009 ET_{40}	—	March 2, 2009	Mount Lemmon	Mount Lemmon Survey	·	2.1 km	MPC · JPL
598852	2009 EX_{41}	—	March 2, 2009	Kitt Peak	Spacewatch	KOR	1.2 km	MPC · JPL
598853	2009 FE_{2}	—	March 17, 2009	Taunus	E. Schwab, R. Kling	·	670 m	MPC · JPL
598854	2009 FZ_{5}	—	February 3, 2009	Mount Lemmon	Mount Lemmon Survey	·	520 m	MPC · JPL
598855 Agerer	2009 FC_{10}	Agerer	February 26, 2009	Calar Alto	F. Hormuth	·	960 m	MPC · JPL
598856	2009 FJ_{16}	—	February 27, 2009	Mount Lemmon	Mount Lemmon Survey	·	1.1 km	MPC · JPL
598857	2009 FA_{26}	—	January 31, 2009	Mount Lemmon	Mount Lemmon Survey	PHO	900 m	MPC · JPL
598858	2009 FQ_{33}	—	March 25, 2009	Mount Lemmon	Mount Lemmon Survey	·	2.0 km	MPC · JPL
598859	2009 FS_{33}	—	November 21, 2003	Kitt Peak	Spacewatch	·	1.0 km	MPC · JPL
598860	2009 FA_{35}	—	January 29, 2009	Mount Lemmon	Mount Lemmon Survey	EOS	1.4 km	MPC · JPL
598861	2009 FT_{42}	—	March 28, 2009	Kitt Peak	Spacewatch	·	870 m	MPC · JPL
598862	2009 FA_{46}	—	March 28, 2009	Mount Lemmon	Mount Lemmon Survey	T_{j} (2.99) · EUP	2.4 km	MPC · JPL
598863	2009 FB_{49}	—	March 26, 2009	Mount Lemmon	Mount Lemmon Survey	NYS	750 m	MPC · JPL
598864	2009 FM_{49}	—	March 27, 2009	Mount Lemmon	Mount Lemmon Survey	HOF	2.2 km	MPC · JPL
598865	2009 FA_{57}	—	March 28, 2009	Catalina	CSS	·	1.2 km	MPC · JPL
598866	2009 FC_{58}	—	August 29, 2006	Kitt Peak	Spacewatch	(7605)	2.8 km	MPC · JPL
598867	2009 FN_{67}	—	March 19, 2009	Mount Lemmon	Mount Lemmon Survey	V	510 m	MPC · JPL
598868	2009 FH_{80}	—	February 28, 2009	Kitt Peak	Spacewatch	·	600 m	MPC · JPL
598869	2009 FK_{82}	—	April 10, 2013	Haleakala	Pan-STARRS 1	·	1.2 km	MPC · JPL
598870	2009 FA_{83}	—	February 26, 2014	Haleakala	Pan-STARRS 1	·	1.7 km	MPC · JPL
598871	2009 FD_{83}	—	February 9, 2016	Haleakala	Pan-STARRS 1	·	860 m	MPC · JPL
598872	2009 FO_{83}	—	March 24, 2009	Mount Lemmon	Mount Lemmon Survey	H	410 m	MPC · JPL
598873	2009 FZ_{83}	—	April 8, 2014	Haleakala	Pan-STARRS 1	·	2.0 km	MPC · JPL
598874	2009 FH_{84}	—	February 22, 2009	Kitt Peak	Spacewatch	3:2 · SHU	3.9 km	MPC · JPL
598875	2009 FJ_{85}	—	May 8, 2014	Haleakala	Pan-STARRS 1	HNS	840 m	MPC · JPL
598876	2009 FO_{85}	—	June 12, 2013	Haleakala	Pan-STARRS 1	·	520 m	MPC · JPL
598877	2009 FC_{87}	—	November 7, 2012	Haleakala	Pan-STARRS 1	·	2.2 km	MPC · JPL
598878	2009 FL_{87}	—	November 24, 2014	Mount Lemmon	Mount Lemmon Survey	·	750 m	MPC · JPL
598879	2009 FZ_{87}	—	March 31, 2009	Kitt Peak	Spacewatch	·	1.7 km	MPC · JPL
598880	2009 FE_{91}	—	March 26, 2009	Mount Lemmon	Mount Lemmon Survey	PHO	920 m	MPC · JPL
598881	2009 FN_{91}	—	March 28, 2009	Mount Lemmon	Mount Lemmon Survey	V	510 m	MPC · JPL
598882	2009 FC_{92}	—	March 31, 2009	Kitt Peak	Spacewatch	·	720 m	MPC · JPL
598883	2009 FJ_{93}	—	March 19, 2009	Kitt Peak	Spacewatch	·	1.2 km	MPC · JPL
598884	2009 FL_{93}	—	March 28, 2009	Kitt Peak	Spacewatch	GEF	980 m	MPC · JPL
598885	2009 GW	—	April 3, 2009	Cerro Burek	Burek, Cerro	·	970 m	MPC · JPL
598886	2009 GU_{7}	—	April 2, 2009	Mount Lemmon	Mount Lemmon Survey	·	2.6 km	MPC · JPL
598887	2009 GA_{8}	—	March 5, 2013	Mount Lemmon	Mount Lemmon Survey	·	1.3 km	MPC · JPL
598888	2009 HU_{5}	—	March 15, 2009	Kitt Peak	Spacewatch	·	1.0 km	MPC · JPL
598889	2009 HT_{7}	—	April 2, 2009	Kitt Peak	Spacewatch	·	1.5 km	MPC · JPL
598890	2009 HR_{9}	—	August 5, 2005	Palomar	NEAT	·	2.5 km	MPC · JPL
598891	2009 HB_{12}	—	February 5, 2009	Catalina	CSS	·	1.0 km	MPC · JPL
598892	2009 HR_{13}	—	April 17, 2009	Catalina	CSS	·	870 m	MPC · JPL
598893	2009 HB_{15}	—	March 28, 2009	Kitt Peak	Spacewatch	·	540 m	MPC · JPL
598894	2009 HF_{15}	—	March 24, 2009	Mount Lemmon	Mount Lemmon Survey	·	1.9 km	MPC · JPL
598895 Artjuhs	2009 HW_{19}	Artjuhs	April 16, 2009	Baldone	K. Černis, I. Eglītis	·	1.8 km	MPC · JPL
598896	2009 HK_{29}	—	March 29, 2009	Mount Lemmon	Mount Lemmon Survey	·	600 m	MPC · JPL
598897	2009 HW_{29}	—	April 19, 2009	Kitt Peak	Spacewatch	·	2.1 km	MPC · JPL
598898	2009 HG_{30}	—	March 18, 2009	Kitt Peak	Spacewatch	·	510 m	MPC · JPL
598899	2009 HR_{30}	—	April 2, 2009	Mount Lemmon	Mount Lemmon Survey	·	1.4 km	MPC · JPL
598900	2009 HV_{32}	—	April 19, 2009	Kitt Peak	Spacewatch	VER	2.3 km	MPC · JPL

== 598901–599000 ==
back to top

Designation			Discovery			Properties		Ref
Permanent	Provisional	Named after	Date	Site	Discoverer(s)	Category	Diam.	Ref
598901	2009 HZ_{32}	—	April 19, 2009	Kitt Peak	Spacewatch	·	1.6 km	MPC · JPL
598902	2009 HS_{35}	—	April 20, 2009	Kitt Peak	Spacewatch	·	800 m	MPC · JPL
598903	2009 HW_{41}	—	May 4, 2002	Palomar	NEAT	·	840 m	MPC · JPL
598904	2009 HU_{43}	—	April 20, 2009	Kitt Peak	Spacewatch	·	1.2 km	MPC · JPL
598905	2009 HC_{48}	—	April 19, 2009	Kitt Peak	Spacewatch	·	930 m	MPC · JPL
598906	2009 HL_{51}	—	April 21, 2009	Kitt Peak	Spacewatch	·	540 m	MPC · JPL
598907	2009 HV_{51}	—	April 23, 2009	Mount Lemmon	Mount Lemmon Survey	·	2.6 km	MPC · JPL
598908	2009 HS_{52}	—	March 31, 2009	Kitt Peak	Spacewatch	MAS	530 m	MPC · JPL
598909	2009 HF_{61}	—	October 16, 2007	Mount Lemmon	Mount Lemmon Survey	·	850 m	MPC · JPL
598910	2009 HF_{67}	—	April 26, 2009	Kitt Peak	Spacewatch	·	1.7 km	MPC · JPL
598911	2009 HX_{69}	—	November 4, 1999	Kitt Peak	Spacewatch	H	360 m	MPC · JPL
598912	2009 HB_{70}	—	April 22, 2009	Mount Lemmon	Mount Lemmon Survey	NYS	690 m	MPC · JPL
598913	2009 HD_{72}	—	April 26, 2009	Mount Lemmon	Mount Lemmon Survey	·	2.0 km	MPC · JPL
598914	2009 HA_{79}	—	April 18, 2009	Kitt Peak	Spacewatch	·	910 m	MPC · JPL
598915	2009 HM_{79}	—	April 18, 2009	Mount Lemmon	Mount Lemmon Survey	·	670 m	MPC · JPL
598916	2009 HP_{81}	—	August 31, 2005	Kitt Peak	Spacewatch	·	1.7 km	MPC · JPL
598917	2009 HZ_{88}	—	April 24, 2009	Cerro Burek	Burek, Cerro	EOS	1.6 km	MPC · JPL
598918	2009 HC_{89}	—	November 7, 2007	Kitt Peak	Spacewatch	NYS	900 m	MPC · JPL
598919	2009 HQ_{90}	—	March 4, 2005	Mount Lemmon	Mount Lemmon Survey	·	1.0 km	MPC · JPL
598920	2009 HA_{96}	—	April 20, 2009	Mount Lemmon	Mount Lemmon Survey	·	580 m	MPC · JPL
598921	2009 HD_{96}	—	April 21, 2009	Kitt Peak	Spacewatch	·	520 m	MPC · JPL
598922	2009 HX_{99}	—	April 22, 2009	Mount Lemmon	Mount Lemmon Survey	·	1.4 km	MPC · JPL
598923	2009 HH_{102}	—	April 21, 2009	Kitt Peak	Spacewatch	·	630 m	MPC · JPL
598924	2009 HB_{103}	—	April 1, 2003	Palomar	NEAT	EUP	3.5 km	MPC · JPL
598925	2009 HZ_{105}	—	December 18, 2007	Mount Lemmon	Mount Lemmon Survey	·	2.8 km	MPC · JPL
598926	2009 HO_{109}	—	October 25, 2000	La Silla	Barbieri, C.	·	2.7 km	MPC · JPL
598927	2009 HU_{109}	—	August 16, 2001	Socorro	LINEAR	·	1.9 km	MPC · JPL
598928	2009 HV_{110}	—	April 21, 2009	Kitt Peak	Spacewatch	·	870 m	MPC · JPL
598929	2009 HF_{111}	—	May 4, 2009	Mount Lemmon	Mount Lemmon Survey	·	620 m	MPC · JPL
598930	2009 HN_{111}	—	April 18, 2009	Kitt Peak	Spacewatch	NYS	1.1 km	MPC · JPL
598931	2009 HQ_{112}	—	April 5, 2014	Haleakala	Pan-STARRS 1	·	1.5 km	MPC · JPL
598932	2009 HU_{112}	—	February 26, 2014	Haleakala	Pan-STARRS 1	·	2.0 km	MPC · JPL
598933	2009 HC_{113}	—	April 18, 2009	Kitt Peak	Spacewatch	·	860 m	MPC · JPL
598934	2009 HR_{113}	—	January 17, 2016	Haleakala	Pan-STARRS 1	3:2	4.0 km	MPC · JPL
598935	2009 HL_{114}	—	April 24, 2009	Mount Lemmon	Mount Lemmon Survey	·	730 m	MPC · JPL
598936	2009 HW_{116}	—	February 28, 2009	Kitt Peak	Spacewatch	3:2 · SHU	4.6 km	MPC · JPL
598937	2009 HJ_{118}	—	July 25, 2015	Haleakala	Pan-STARRS 1	·	1.8 km	MPC · JPL
598938	2009 HA_{120}	—	October 5, 2016	Mount Lemmon	Mount Lemmon Survey	·	1.7 km	MPC · JPL
598939	2009 HM_{120}	—	February 16, 2013	Kitt Peak	Spacewatch	·	1.8 km	MPC · JPL
598940	2009 HT_{123}	—	April 24, 2009	Mount Lemmon	Mount Lemmon Survey	·	2.2 km	MPC · JPL
598941	2009 HD_{124}	—	April 22, 2009	Mount Lemmon	Mount Lemmon Survey	·	780 m	MPC · JPL
598942	2009 HR_{125}	—	April 30, 2009	Mount Lemmon	Mount Lemmon Survey	·	1.3 km	MPC · JPL
598943	2009 JW_{2}	—	March 28, 2009	Kitt Peak	Spacewatch	NYS	780 m	MPC · JPL
598944	2009 JY_{5}	—	May 13, 2009	Kitt Peak	Spacewatch	·	500 m	MPC · JPL
598945	2009 JM_{6}	—	May 13, 2009	Kitt Peak	Spacewatch	·	560 m	MPC · JPL
598946	2009 JZ_{7}	—	May 13, 2009	Kitt Peak	Spacewatch	EOS	1.7 km	MPC · JPL
598947	2009 JJ_{8}	—	April 20, 2009	Kitt Peak	Spacewatch	·	690 m	MPC · JPL
598948	2009 JG_{10}	—	May 14, 2009	Kitt Peak	Spacewatch	TIR	3.0 km	MPC · JPL
598949	2009 JG_{12}	—	August 22, 1995	Kitt Peak	Spacewatch	·	2.0 km	MPC · JPL
598950	2009 JT_{14}	—	May 2, 2009	Cerro Burek	Burek, Cerro	·	620 m	MPC · JPL
598951	2009 JK_{18}	—	May 15, 2009	Kitt Peak	Spacewatch	·	810 m	MPC · JPL
598952	2009 JU_{19}	—	November 11, 2010	Mount Lemmon	Mount Lemmon Survey	·	670 m	MPC · JPL
598953	2009 JE_{20}	—	February 6, 2016	Haleakala	Pan-STARRS 1	NYS	870 m	MPC · JPL
598954	2009 JK_{20}	—	May 2, 2009	Catalina	CSS	PHO	620 m	MPC · JPL
598955	2009 JS_{20}	—	April 5, 2014	Haleakala	Pan-STARRS 1	·	1.8 km	MPC · JPL
598956	2009 JE_{22}	—	May 13, 2009	Kitt Peak	Spacewatch	·	750 m	MPC · JPL
598957	2009 JC_{23}	—	May 1, 2009	Mount Lemmon	Mount Lemmon Survey	·	660 m	MPC · JPL
598958	2009 KM_{6}	—	May 13, 2009	Kitt Peak	Spacewatch	·	790 m	MPC · JPL
598959	2009 KS_{6}	—	May 25, 2009	Mount Lemmon	Mount Lemmon Survey	·	2.4 km	MPC · JPL
598960	2009 KG_{8}	—	May 27, 2009	Hibiscus	Teamo, N.	·	560 m	MPC · JPL
598961	2009 KO_{15}	—	March 25, 2009	Mount Lemmon	Mount Lemmon Survey	·	1.1 km	MPC · JPL
598962	2009 KR_{16}	—	May 26, 2009	Kitt Peak	Spacewatch	·	960 m	MPC · JPL
598963	2009 KL_{18}	—	May 27, 2009	Mount Lemmon	Mount Lemmon Survey	PHO	780 m	MPC · JPL
598964	2009 KQ_{21}	—	May 29, 2009	Bergisch Gladbach	W. Bickel	H	450 m	MPC · JPL
598965	2009 KT_{25}	—	May 17, 2009	Mount Lemmon	Mount Lemmon Survey	·	2.6 km	MPC · JPL
598966	2009 KX_{28}	—	May 30, 2009	Bergisch Gladbach	W. Bickel	·	1.4 km	MPC · JPL
598967	2009 KO_{29}	—	May 29, 2009	Mount Lemmon	Mount Lemmon Survey	·	790 m	MPC · JPL
598968	2009 KU_{29}	—	February 12, 2008	Mount Lemmon	Mount Lemmon Survey	·	910 m	MPC · JPL
598969	2009 KB_{38}	—	June 3, 2005	Siding Spring	SSS	·	1.6 km	MPC · JPL
598970	2009 KL_{38}	—	January 29, 2014	Kitt Peak	Spacewatch	·	2.6 km	MPC · JPL
598971	2009 KR_{38}	—	November 8, 2010	Mount Lemmon	Mount Lemmon Survey	·	1.3 km	MPC · JPL
598972	2009 KX_{39}	—	January 14, 2016	Haleakala	Pan-STARRS 1	·	790 m	MPC · JPL
598973	2009 KB_{40}	—	May 16, 2009	Mount Lemmon	Mount Lemmon Survey	(883)	470 m	MPC · JPL
598974	2009 KO_{40}	—	June 13, 2015	Haleakala	Pan-STARRS 1	·	2.6 km	MPC · JPL
598975	2009 KV_{41}	—	September 30, 2010	Mount Lemmon	Mount Lemmon Survey	NYS	900 m	MPC · JPL
598976	2009 KG_{42}	—	May 30, 2009	Mount Lemmon	Mount Lemmon Survey	·	1.8 km	MPC · JPL
598977	2009 KS_{42}	—	May 17, 2009	Kitt Peak	Spacewatch	·	980 m	MPC · JPL
598978	2009 KV_{42}	—	May 28, 2009	Mount Lemmon	Mount Lemmon Survey	·	990 m	MPC · JPL
598979	2009 KW_{42}	—	May 18, 2009	Mount Lemmon	Mount Lemmon Survey	JUN	730 m	MPC · JPL
598980	2009 LL_{1}	—	June 12, 2009	Kitt Peak	Spacewatch	·	1.9 km	MPC · JPL
598981	2009 LP_{5}	—	June 14, 2009	Kitt Peak	Spacewatch	·	1.3 km	MPC · JPL
598982	2009 MA_{3}	—	June 17, 2009	Kitt Peak	Spacewatch	·	3.0 km	MPC · JPL
598983	2009 MX_{12}	—	June 19, 2009	Mount Lemmon	Mount Lemmon Survey	H	490 m	MPC · JPL
598984	2009 NO_{2}	—	July 14, 2009	Kitt Peak	Spacewatch	·	940 m	MPC · JPL
598985	2009 OX_{1}	—	July 19, 2009	Črni Vrh	Matičič, S.	H	630 m	MPC · JPL
598986	2009 OV_{5}	—	July 27, 2009	Catalina	CSS	EUP	4.2 km	MPC · JPL
598987	2009 OT_{6}	—	July 26, 2009	Farra d'Isonzo	Farra d'Isonzo	H	470 m	MPC · JPL
598988	2009 OT_{7}	—	July 27, 2009	Kitt Peak	Spacewatch	·	720 m	MPC · JPL
598989	2009 OG_{8}	—	July 28, 2009	Calvin-Rehoboth	L. A. Molnar	·	2.9 km	MPC · JPL
598990	2009 OZ_{11}	—	July 27, 2009	Kitt Peak	Spacewatch	·	2.6 km	MPC · JPL
598991	2009 OZ_{12}	—	July 27, 2009	Kitt Peak	Spacewatch	·	2.8 km	MPC · JPL
598992	2009 OK_{14}	—	July 30, 2009	Catalina	CSS	·	2.6 km	MPC · JPL
598993	2009 ON_{19}	—	July 28, 2009	Kitt Peak	Spacewatch	·	1.0 km	MPC · JPL
598994	2009 OG_{25}	—	June 24, 2009	Kitt Peak	Spacewatch	·	2.8 km	MPC · JPL
598995	2009 OE_{27}	—	July 29, 2009	Kitt Peak	Spacewatch	·	2.7 km	MPC · JPL
598996	2009 OH_{27}	—	November 13, 2010	Mount Lemmon	Mount Lemmon Survey	·	2.9 km	MPC · JPL
598997	2009 OL_{27}	—	August 14, 2014	Haleakala	Pan-STARRS 1	·	2.3 km	MPC · JPL
598998	2009 OO_{27}	—	July 31, 2009	Kitt Peak	Spacewatch	·	2.2 km	MPC · JPL
598999	2009 OT_{27}	—	February 29, 2012	Mount Lemmon	Mount Lemmon Survey	·	1.0 km	MPC · JPL
599000	2009 ON_{28}	—	July 29, 2009	Kitt Peak	Spacewatch	ELF	2.9 km	MPC · JPL

back to top

== Meaning of names ==
As minor planet discoveries are confirmed, they are given a permanent number by the IAU's Minor Planet Center (MPC), and the discoverers can then submit names for them, following the IAU's naming conventions. The list below concerns those minor planets in the specified number-range that have received names, and explains the meanings of those names.

Official naming citations of newly named small Solar System bodies are approved and published in a bulletin by IAU's Working Group for Small Bodies Nomenclature (WGSBN). Before May 2021, citations were published in MPC's Minor Planet Circulars for many decades. Recent citations can also be found on the JPL Small-Body Database (SBDB). Until his death in 2016, German astronomer Lutz D. Schmadel compiled these citations into the Dictionary of Minor Planet Names (DMP) and regularly updated the collection.

Based on Paul Herget's The Names of the Minor Planets, Schmadel also researched the unclear origin of numerous asteroids, most of which had been named prior to World War II. This article incorporates text from this source, which is in the public domain: SBDB New namings may only be added to this list below after official publication as the preannouncement of names is condemned. The WGSBN publishes a comprehensive guideline for the naming rules of non-cometary small Solar System bodies.

Named minor planet	Provisional	This minor planet was named for...	Ref · Catalog
598719 Alegalli	2009 BO_{64}	Alejandro Galli (born 1964), an Uruguayan amateur astronomer and popularizer of astronomy in South America, who studies small Solar System bodies, meteor showers and variable stars.	IAU · 598719
598855 Agerer	2009 FC_{10}	Franz Agerer (1943–2022), a German amateur astronomer.	IAU · 598855
598895 Artjuhs	2009 HW_{19}	Jurijs Artjuhs (1943–2012), a leading researcher of the Institute of Electronics and Computer Sciences, Latvia.	IAU · 598895
