= List of minor planets: 623001–624000 =

The following is a partial list of minor planets, running from minor-planet number 623001 through 624000, inclusive. The primary data for this and other partial lists is based on JPL's "Small-Body Orbital Elements" and data available from the Minor Planet Center. Critical list information is also provided by the MPC, unless otherwise specified from Lowell Observatory. A detailed description of the table's columns and additional sources are given on the main page including a complete list of every page in this series, and a statistical break-up on the dynamical classification of minor planets.

Also see the summary list of all named bodies in numerical and alphabetical order, and the corresponding naming citations for the number range of this particular list. New namings may only be added to this list after official publication, as the preannouncement of names is condemned by the Working Group for Small Bodies Nomenclature of the International Astronomical Union.

Near-Earth obj.	MBA (inner)	MBA (outer)	Centaur
Mars-crosser	MBA (middle)	Jupiter trojan	Trans-Neptunian obj.
Unclassified

== 623001–623100 ==
Designation			Discovery			Properties		Ref
Permanent	Provisional	Named after	Date	Site	Discoverer(s)	Category	Diam.	Ref
623001	2015 FV_{9}	—	March 16, 2015	Haleakala	Pan-STARRS 1	PHO	680 m	MPC · JPL
623002	2015 FH_{33}	—	February 23, 2015	Haleakala	Pan-STARRS 1	H	410 m	MPC · JPL
623003	2015 FL_{36}	—	October 12, 2006	Kitt Peak	Spacewatch	H	340 m	MPC · JPL
623004	2015 FU_{43}	—	March 17, 2015	Haleakala	Pan-STARRS 1	·	2.9 km	MPC · JPL
623005	2015 FH_{64}	—	February 20, 2015	Haleakala	Pan-STARRS 1	·	1.2 km	MPC · JPL
623006	2015 FH_{65}	—	January 28, 2015	Haleakala	Pan-STARRS 1	PHO	750 m	MPC · JPL
623007	2015 FA_{90}	—	March 20, 2015	Haleakala	Pan-STARRS 1	PHO	590 m	MPC · JPL
623008	2015 FP_{122}	—	February 9, 2011	Mount Lemmon	Mount Lemmon Survey	·	990 m	MPC · JPL
623009	2015 FZ_{156}	—	March 21, 2015	Haleakala	Pan-STARRS 1	·	890 m	MPC · JPL
623010	2015 FZ_{187}	—	March 22, 2015	Haleakala	Pan-STARRS 1	·	3.1 km	MPC · JPL
623011	2015 FJ_{221}	—	February 18, 2015	Haleakala	Pan-STARRS 1	·	2.9 km	MPC · JPL
623012	2015 FO_{221}	—	February 18, 2015	Haleakala	Pan-STARRS 1	NYS	1.0 km	MPC · JPL
623013	2015 FW_{243}	—	October 29, 2005	Mount Lemmon	Mount Lemmon Survey	·	950 m	MPC · JPL
623014	2015 FU_{244}	—	March 23, 2015	Haleakala	Pan-STARRS 1	·	890 m	MPC · JPL
623015	2015 FB_{255}	—	March 23, 2015	Haleakala	Pan-STARRS 1	MAS	600 m	MPC · JPL
623016	2015 FB_{256}	—	November 5, 2005	Mount Lemmon	Mount Lemmon Survey	·	950 m	MPC · JPL
623017	2015 FY_{280}	—	November 9, 2013	Mount Lemmon	Mount Lemmon Survey	·	840 m	MPC · JPL
623018	2015 FJ_{285}	—	January 16, 2011	Mount Lemmon	Mount Lemmon Survey	NYS	1.0 km	MPC · JPL
623019	2015 FG_{296}	—	March 28, 2015	Haleakala	Pan-STARRS 1	·	1.3 km	MPC · JPL
623020	2015 FV_{300}	—	February 6, 2014	Mount Lemmon	Mount Lemmon Survey	·	1.4 km	MPC · JPL
623021	2015 FW_{306}	—	November 27, 2006	Mount Lemmon	Mount Lemmon Survey	·	960 m	MPC · JPL
623022	2015 FF_{355}	—	August 14, 2009	Dauban	C. Rinner, Kugel, F.	3:2 · SHU	4.8 km	MPC · JPL
623023	2015 FV_{368}	—	October 1, 2013	Catalina	CSS	PHO	820 m	MPC · JPL
623024	2015 FW_{406}	—	January 22, 2015	Haleakala	Pan-STARRS 1	·	860 m	MPC · JPL
623025	2015 FR_{415}	—	March 23, 2015	Mount Lemmon	Mount Lemmon Survey	·	830 m	MPC · JPL
623026	2015 FT_{427}	—	March 28, 2015	Mount Lemmon	Mount Lemmon Survey	H	420 m	MPC · JPL
623027	2015 FG_{440}	—	March 30, 2015	Haleakala	Pan-STARRS 1	NYS	860 m	MPC · JPL
623028	2015 GF_{17}	—	August 25, 2012	Kitt Peak	Spacewatch	·	880 m	MPC · JPL
623029	2015 GR_{19}	—	April 11, 2015	Mount Lemmon	Mount Lemmon Survey	MAS	610 m	MPC · JPL
623030	2015 GG_{48}	—	April 15, 2015	Haleakala	Pan-STARRS 1	·	1.1 km	MPC · JPL
623031 Cartaya	2015 GP_{61}	Cartaya	March 28, 2015	Mount Graham	K. Černis, R. P. Boyle	·	1.1 km	MPC · JPL
623032	2015 GZ_{72}	—	April 14, 2015	Mount Lemmon	Mount Lemmon Survey	·	530 m	MPC · JPL
623033	2015 HW_{6}	—	August 26, 2012	Haleakala	Pan-STARRS 1	·	950 m	MPC · JPL
623034	2015 HJ_{12}	—	February 16, 2015	Haleakala	Pan-STARRS 1	·	1.0 km	MPC · JPL
623035	2015 HH_{13}	—	March 21, 2015	Haleakala	Pan-STARRS 1	·	1.1 km	MPC · JPL
623036	2015 HF_{67}	—	October 8, 2008	Mount Lemmon	Mount Lemmon Survey	·	600 m	MPC · JPL
623037	2015 HX_{84}	—	October 18, 2012	Haleakala	Pan-STARRS 1	·	810 m	MPC · JPL
623038	2015 HR_{90}	—	September 6, 2008	Kitt Peak	Spacewatch	·	890 m	MPC · JPL
623039	2015 HL_{92}	—	August 7, 2008	Kitt Peak	Spacewatch	MAS	540 m	MPC · JPL
623040	2015 HU_{96}	—	April 3, 2011	Haleakala	Pan-STARRS 1	·	950 m	MPC · JPL
623041	2015 HB_{99}	—	October 28, 2008	Mount Lemmon	Mount Lemmon Survey	·	760 m	MPC · JPL
623042	2015 HR_{101}	—	September 23, 2008	Kitt Peak	Spacewatch	·	780 m	MPC · JPL
623043	2015 HR_{120}	—	August 20, 2004	Kitt Peak	Spacewatch	NYS	750 m	MPC · JPL
623044	2015 HX_{122}	—	March 17, 2015	Haleakala	Pan-STARRS 1	·	650 m	MPC · JPL
623045	2015 HR_{125}	—	April 14, 2015	Mount Lemmon	Mount Lemmon Survey	·	1.5 km	MPC · JPL
623046	2015 HJ_{128}	—	August 25, 2012	Haleakala	Pan-STARRS 1	NYS	1.0 km	MPC · JPL
623047	2015 HY_{134}	—	May 26, 2011	Mount Lemmon	Mount Lemmon Survey	·	1.1 km	MPC · JPL
623048	2015 HW_{152}	—	May 27, 2011	Kitt Peak	Spacewatch	·	940 m	MPC · JPL
623049	2015 HV_{190}	—	October 21, 2012	Haleakala	Pan-STARRS 1	·	860 m	MPC · JPL
623050	2015 HP_{203}	—	April 23, 2015	Haleakala	Pan-STARRS 1	(5)	1.0 km	MPC · JPL
623051	2015 HL_{204}	—	April 20, 2015	Haleakala	Pan-STARRS 1	·	1.2 km	MPC · JPL
623052	2015 HK_{209}	—	April 6, 2011	Mount Lemmon	Mount Lemmon Survey	·	750 m	MPC · JPL
623053	2015 HP_{211}	—	April 23, 2015	Haleakala	Pan-STARRS 1	·	870 m	MPC · JPL
623054	2015 JM	—	February 27, 2015	Haleakala	Pan-STARRS 1	·	810 m	MPC · JPL
623055	2015 JE_{3}	—	April 20, 2015	Haleakala	Pan-STARRS 1	H	390 m	MPC · JPL
623056	2015 JQ_{8}	—	February 23, 2015	Haleakala	Pan-STARRS 1	V	470 m	MPC · JPL
623057	2015 JY_{11}	—	June 8, 2013	Mount Lemmon	Mount Lemmon Survey	H	470 m	MPC · JPL
623058	2015 JP_{17}	—	May 15, 2015	Haleakala	Pan-STARRS 1	·	1.0 km	MPC · JPL
623059	2015 KB	—	March 28, 2015	Haleakala	Pan-STARRS 1	H	400 m	MPC · JPL
623060	2015 KF_{6}	—	December 12, 2012	Mount Lemmon	Mount Lemmon Survey	·	1.1 km	MPC · JPL
623061	2015 KE_{14}	—	October 15, 2012	Haleakala	Pan-STARRS 1	·	960 m	MPC · JPL
623062	2015 KU_{21}	—	October 22, 2008	Socorro	LINEAR	H	420 m	MPC · JPL
623063	2015 KM_{29}	—	May 12, 2015	Mount Lemmon	Mount Lemmon Survey	MAR	630 m	MPC · JPL
623064	2015 KR_{37}	—	May 20, 2015	Mount Lemmon	Mount Lemmon Survey	·	960 m	MPC · JPL
623065	2015 KJ_{86}	—	May 22, 2011	Mount Lemmon	Mount Lemmon Survey	·	810 m	MPC · JPL
623066	2015 KE_{118}	—	September 26, 2003	Apache Point	SDSS Collaboration	·	1.1 km	MPC · JPL
623067	2015 KP_{143}	—	May 11, 2015	Cerro Paranal	Altmann, M., Prusti, T.	·	930 m	MPC · JPL
623068	2015 KP_{159}	—	March 22, 2015	Haleakala	Pan-STARRS 1	·	1.4 km	MPC · JPL
623069	2015 KR_{167}	—	November 1, 2008	Mount Lemmon	Mount Lemmon Survey	·	720 m	MPC · JPL
623070	2015 KW_{174}	—	May 21, 2015	Mauna Kea	OSSOS	other TNO	100 km	MPC · JPL
623071	2015 KY_{181}	—	November 17, 2017	Haleakala	Pan-STARRS 1	·	750 m	MPC · JPL
623072	2015 KC_{184}	—	May 18, 2015	Haleakala	Pan-STARRS 1	BAR	990 m	MPC · JPL
623073	2015 KS_{185}	—	May 21, 2015	Haleakala	Pan-STARRS 1	·	730 m	MPC · JPL
623074	2015 KP_{187}	—	May 21, 2015	Haleakala	Pan-STARRS 1	(5)	890 m	MPC · JPL
623075	2015 LE_{2}	—	April 11, 2007	Mount Lemmon	Mount Lemmon Survey	H	430 m	MPC · JPL
623076	2015 LO_{6}	—	November 9, 2013	Haleakala	Pan-STARRS 1	H	370 m	MPC · JPL
623077	2015 LV_{6}	—	October 7, 2013	Mount Lemmon	Mount Lemmon Survey	H	360 m	MPC · JPL
623078	2015 LW_{7}	—	May 25, 2015	Haleakala	Pan-STARRS 1	·	1.1 km	MPC · JPL
623079	2015 LT_{19}	—	June 11, 2015	Haleakala	Pan-STARRS 1	MAR	970 m	MPC · JPL
623080	2015 LQ_{20}	—	February 25, 2009	Catalina	CSS	H	510 m	MPC · JPL
623081	2015 LF_{25}	—	May 22, 2015	Haleakala	Pan-STARRS 1	·	1.0 km	MPC · JPL
623082	2015 LH_{34}	—	August 31, 2011	Haleakala	Pan-STARRS 1	·	1.2 km	MPC · JPL
623083	2015 LZ_{40}	—	June 13, 2015	Mount Lemmon	Mount Lemmon Survey	H	540 m	MPC · JPL
623084	2015 LM_{44}	—	February 24, 2014	Haleakala	Pan-STARRS 1	·	1.4 km	MPC · JPL
623085	2015 LV_{44}	—	June 13, 2015	Haleakala	Pan-STARRS 1	·	1.3 km	MPC · JPL
623086	2015 LF_{48}	—	June 7, 2015	Haleakala	Pan-STARRS 1	·	1.2 km	MPC · JPL
623087	2015 LY_{48}	—	June 11, 2015	Haleakala	Pan-STARRS 1	·	920 m	MPC · JPL
623088	2015 MR_{6}	—	January 26, 2014	Haleakala	Pan-STARRS 1	·	1.3 km	MPC · JPL
623089	2015 MT_{9}	—	June 13, 2015	Mount Lemmon	Mount Lemmon Survey	JUN	1.1 km	MPC · JPL
623090	2015 MG_{35}	—	October 21, 2012	Mount Lemmon	Mount Lemmon Survey	·	1.1 km	MPC · JPL
623091	2015 MJ_{38}	—	March 28, 2015	Haleakala	Pan-STARRS 1	MAR	650 m	MPC · JPL
623092	2015 ME_{40}	—	November 6, 2013	Haleakala	Pan-STARRS 1	EUN	1.1 km	MPC · JPL
623093	2015 MS_{42}	—	October 8, 2008	Kitt Peak	Spacewatch	·	990 m	MPC · JPL
623094	2015 MZ_{47}	—	January 9, 2013	Kitt Peak	Spacewatch	·	1.1 km	MPC · JPL
623095	2015 MF_{93}	—	May 22, 2015	Haleakala	Pan-STARRS 1	·	1.3 km	MPC · JPL
623096	2015 MX_{105}	—	September 19, 2003	Palomar	NEAT	·	2.1 km	MPC · JPL
623097	2015 MM_{108}	—	June 20, 2015	Haleakala	Pan-STARRS 1	·	850 m	MPC · JPL
623098	2015 MB_{111}	—	July 26, 2011	Haleakala	Pan-STARRS 1	·	810 m	MPC · JPL
623099	2015 MJ_{112}	—	October 17, 2007	Mount Lemmon	Mount Lemmon Survey	·	1.1 km	MPC · JPL
623100	2015 MA_{113}	—	September 26, 2011	Mount Lemmon	Mount Lemmon Survey	NEM	1.7 km	MPC · JPL

== 623101–623200 ==
back to top

Designation			Discovery			Properties		Ref
Permanent	Provisional	Named after	Date	Site	Discoverer(s)	Category	Diam.	Ref
623101	2015 MU_{113}	—	June 27, 2015	Haleakala	Pan-STARRS 1	·	1.0 km	MPC · JPL
623102	2015 MV_{113}	—	October 22, 2012	Haleakala	Pan-STARRS 1	·	1.5 km	MPC · JPL
623103	2015 MG_{117}	—	August 30, 2011	Piszkés-tető	K. Sárneczky, S. Kürti	·	1.9 km	MPC · JPL
623104	2015 MO_{117}	—	June 27, 2015	Haleakala	Pan-STARRS 2	ADE	1.6 km	MPC · JPL
623105	2015 MP_{118}	—	April 30, 2006	Kitt Peak	Spacewatch	·	1.0 km	MPC · JPL
623106	2015 MH_{125}	—	June 28, 2015	Haleakala	Pan-STARRS 1	·	1.9 km	MPC · JPL
623107	2015 MB_{130}	—	October 11, 2007	Kitt Peak	Spacewatch	·	1.3 km	MPC · JPL
623108	2015 ME_{135}	—	May 9, 2006	Mount Lemmon	Mount Lemmon Survey	·	1.2 km	MPC · JPL
623109	2015 MV_{135}	—	October 21, 2006	Mount Lemmon	Mount Lemmon Survey	·	1.7 km	MPC · JPL
623110	2015 MC_{138}	—	June 27, 2015	Haleakala	Pan-STARRS 1	·	1.3 km	MPC · JPL
623111	2015 MD_{138}	—	December 3, 2008	Kitt Peak	Spacewatch	·	1.2 km	MPC · JPL
623112	2015 MH_{140}	—	February 9, 2014	Mount Lemmon	Mount Lemmon Survey	·	1.2 km	MPC · JPL
623113	2015 MP_{140}	—	June 17, 2015	Haleakala	Pan-STARRS 1	MAR	790 m	MPC · JPL
623114	2015 MS_{140}	—	September 19, 2011	Mount Lemmon	Mount Lemmon Survey	·	1.1 km	MPC · JPL
623115	2015 MT_{161}	—	October 2, 2016	Haleakala	Pan-STARRS 1	·	1.4 km	MPC · JPL
623116	2015 NH	—	April 15, 2012	Haleakala	Pan-STARRS 1	H	410 m	MPC · JPL
623117	2015 NV_{1}	—	November 27, 2013	Haleakala	Pan-STARRS 1	H	330 m	MPC · JPL
623118	2015 NL_{2}	—	August 8, 2007	Siding Spring	SSS	·	1.6 km	MPC · JPL
623119	2015 NY_{20}	—	July 13, 2015	Haleakala	Pan-STARRS 1	EUN	860 m	MPC · JPL
623120	2015 NN_{21}	—	April 8, 2002	Cerro Tololo	Deep Ecliptic Survey	·	1.1 km	MPC · JPL
623121	2015 NQ_{26}	—	June 8, 2011	Mount Lemmon	Mount Lemmon Survey	EUN	1.0 km	MPC · JPL
623122	2015 NZ_{27}	—	September 27, 2011	Mount Lemmon	Mount Lemmon Survey	·	1.4 km	MPC · JPL
623123	2015 NT_{28}	—	July 8, 2015	Haleakala	Pan-STARRS 1	·	1.1 km	MPC · JPL
623124	2015 NB_{34}	—	July 9, 2015	Haleakala	Pan-STARRS 1	MAR	730 m	MPC · JPL
623125	2015 OB_{13}	—	October 9, 2007	Mount Lemmon	Mount Lemmon Survey	·	1.2 km	MPC · JPL
623126	2015 OC_{14}	—	June 3, 2011	Mount Lemmon	Mount Lemmon Survey	·	1.1 km	MPC · JPL
623127	2015 OA_{16}	—	October 12, 2007	Mount Lemmon	Mount Lemmon Survey	·	1.3 km	MPC · JPL
623128	2015 OO_{24}	—	October 18, 2003	Apache Point	SDSS Collaboration	·	960 m	MPC · JPL
623129	2015 OF_{29}	—	January 14, 2013	ESA OGS	ESA OGS	·	1.0 km	MPC · JPL
623130	2015 OB_{30}	—	January 9, 2014	Haleakala	Pan-STARRS 1	H	430 m	MPC · JPL
623131	2015 OZ_{31}	—	August 16, 2001	Socorro	LINEAR	TIN	820 m	MPC · JPL
623132	2015 OM_{34}	—	August 4, 2011	Siding Spring	SSS	·	940 m	MPC · JPL
623133	2015 OH_{41}	—	November 14, 2007	Kitt Peak	Spacewatch	·	940 m	MPC · JPL
623134	2015 OW_{62}	—	September 26, 2003	Apache Point	SDSS	EUN	950 m	MPC · JPL
623135	2015 OV_{71}	—	October 18, 2007	Mount Lemmon	Mount Lemmon Survey	·	1.1 km	MPC · JPL
623136	2015 OX_{75}	—	July 23, 2015	Haleakala	Pan-STARRS 1	·	1.6 km	MPC · JPL
623137	2015 OU_{77}	—	August 13, 2006	Palomar	NEAT	·	1.6 km	MPC · JPL
623138	2015 OA_{93}	—	July 19, 2015	Haleakala	Pan-STARRS 1	·	1.3 km	MPC · JPL
623139	2015 OJ_{93}	—	September 29, 2011	Mount Lemmon	Mount Lemmon Survey	·	1.5 km	MPC · JPL
623140	2015 OT_{100}	—	February 3, 2013	Haleakala	Pan-STARRS 1	WIT	750 m	MPC · JPL
623141	2015 OC_{102}	—	July 25, 2015	Haleakala	Pan-STARRS 1	·	1.3 km	MPC · JPL
623142	2015 OS_{102}	—	July 25, 2015	Haleakala	Pan-STARRS 1	·	1.7 km	MPC · JPL
623143	2015 OK_{104}	—	January 17, 2013	Haleakala	Pan-STARRS 1	·	1.3 km	MPC · JPL
623144	2015 OM_{162}	—	July 24, 2015	Haleakala	Pan-STARRS 1	EOS	1.1 km	MPC · JPL
623145	2015 PW_{1}	—	December 12, 2012	Mount Lemmon	Mount Lemmon Survey	·	1.3 km	MPC · JPL
623146	2015 PX_{1}	—	October 4, 2007	Catalina	CSS	·	1.0 km	MPC · JPL
623147	2015 PP_{16}	—	February 28, 2014	Haleakala	Pan-STARRS 1	·	1.2 km	MPC · JPL
623148	2015 PV_{22}	—	September 8, 2011	Kitt Peak	Spacewatch	·	1.1 km	MPC · JPL
623149	2015 PM_{23}	—	April 21, 2006	Kitt Peak	Spacewatch	·	1.3 km	MPC · JPL
623150	2015 PV_{29}	—	September 13, 2007	Catalina	CSS	·	970 m	MPC · JPL
623151	2015 PM_{30}	—	September 29, 2011	Mount Lemmon	Mount Lemmon Survey	·	1.5 km	MPC · JPL
623152	2015 PT_{30}	—	August 26, 2011	Piszkés-tető	K. Sárneczky, S. Kürti	·	1.2 km	MPC · JPL
623153	2015 PC_{34}	—	June 25, 2015	Haleakala	Pan-STARRS 1	EUN	1.1 km	MPC · JPL
623154	2015 PR_{47}	—	October 19, 2011	Kitt Peak	Spacewatch	·	1.4 km	MPC · JPL
623155	2015 PE_{53}	—	November 9, 2007	Catalina	CSS	·	1.0 km	MPC · JPL
623156	2015 PR_{55}	—	October 2, 2011	Charleston	R. Holmes	·	980 m	MPC · JPL
623157	2015 PN_{63}	—	September 21, 2011	Catalina	CSS	·	1.1 km	MPC · JPL
623158	2015 PM_{105}	—	September 2, 2011	Haleakala	Pan-STARRS 1	·	960 m	MPC · JPL
623159	2015 PT_{109}	—	August 10, 2007	Kitt Peak	Spacewatch	·	690 m	MPC · JPL
623160	2015 PM_{120}	—	December 23, 2012	Haleakala	Pan-STARRS 1	·	1.2 km	MPC · JPL
623161	2015 PJ_{121}	—	November 17, 2007	Mount Lemmon	Mount Lemmon Survey	·	1.1 km	MPC · JPL
623162	2015 PF_{137}	—	February 9, 2013	Haleakala	Pan-STARRS 1	·	870 m	MPC · JPL
623163	2015 PW_{159}	—	September 24, 2011	Mount Lemmon	Mount Lemmon Survey	·	1.2 km	MPC · JPL
623164	2015 PC_{181}	—	July 24, 2015	Haleakala	Pan-STARRS 1	·	940 m	MPC · JPL
623165	2015 PA_{182}	—	July 24, 2015	Haleakala	Pan-STARRS 1	·	1.7 km	MPC · JPL
623166	2015 PY_{189}	—	April 4, 2014	Haleakala	Pan-STARRS 1	·	1.4 km	MPC · JPL
623167	2015 PD_{215}	—	July 19, 2015	Haleakala	Pan-STARRS 1	·	1.5 km	MPC · JPL
623168	2015 PQ_{216}	—	August 10, 2015	Haleakala	Pan-STARRS 1	·	1.3 km	MPC · JPL
623169	2015 PB_{218}	—	October 11, 2007	Kitt Peak	Spacewatch	ADE	1.6 km	MPC · JPL
623170	2015 PJ_{222}	—	July 25, 2015	Haleakala	Pan-STARRS 1	EUN	1.0 km	MPC · JPL
623171	2015 PZ_{225}	—	September 23, 2011	Haleakala	Pan-STARRS 1	·	1.6 km	MPC · JPL
623172	2015 PR_{231}	—	September 11, 2007	Mount Lemmon	Mount Lemmon Survey	·	870 m	MPC · JPL
623173	2015 PA_{241}	—	October 9, 2007	Mount Lemmon	Mount Lemmon Survey	·	1.4 km	MPC · JPL
623174	2015 PZ_{262}	—	August 11, 2015	Haleakala	Pan-STARRS 1	·	1.5 km	MPC · JPL
623175	2015 PC_{279}	—	August 21, 2006	Kitt Peak	Spacewatch	·	1.6 km	MPC · JPL
623176	2015 PR_{281}	—	April 24, 2014	Haleakala	Pan-STARRS 1	·	1.6 km	MPC · JPL
623177	2015 PY_{283}	—	December 27, 1999	Kitt Peak	Spacewatch	·	890 m	MPC · JPL
623178	2015 PK_{284}	—	September 14, 2007	Catalina	CSS	·	980 m	MPC · JPL
623179	2015 PM_{287}	—	October 19, 2007	Catalina	CSS	·	870 m	MPC · JPL
623180	2015 PP_{287}	—	April 8, 2006	Kitt Peak	Spacewatch	·	980 m	MPC · JPL
623181	2015 PL_{295}	—	February 12, 2003	Haleakala	NEAT	DOR	2.7 km	MPC · JPL
623182	2015 PH_{300}	—	July 26, 2006	Siding Spring	SSS	·	1.6 km	MPC · JPL
623183	2015 PV_{303}	—	May 11, 2010	Mount Lemmon	Mount Lemmon Survey	·	1.1 km	MPC · JPL
623184	2015 PV_{306}	—	April 10, 2013	Haleakala	Pan-STARRS 1	T_{j} (2.92)	4.3 km	MPC · JPL
623185	2015 PG_{317}	—	October 24, 2011	Haleakala	Pan-STARRS 1	·	1.4 km	MPC · JPL
623186	2015 PG_{318}	—	August 9, 2015	Haleakala	Pan-STARRS 1	·	1.2 km	MPC · JPL
623187	2015 PU_{319}	—	September 24, 2011	Haleakala	Pan-STARRS 1	·	1.4 km	MPC · JPL
623188	2015 PY_{319}	—	September 24, 2011	Haleakala	Pan-STARRS 1	·	1.4 km	MPC · JPL
623189	2015 PT_{320}	—	August 12, 2015	Haleakala	Pan-STARRS 1	·	1.4 km	MPC · JPL
623190	2015 PC_{323}	—	April 1, 2014	Mount Lemmon	Mount Lemmon Survey	·	1.2 km	MPC · JPL
623191	2015 QY_{4}	—	September 13, 2007	Mount Lemmon	Mount Lemmon Survey	·	620 m	MPC · JPL
623192	2015 QR_{8}	—	October 22, 2012	Haleakala	Pan-STARRS 1	·	680 m	MPC · JPL
623193	2015 QP_{14}	—	October 24, 2011	Haleakala	Pan-STARRS 1	AGN	940 m	MPC · JPL
623194	2015 QQ_{14}	—	May 26, 2014	Haleakala	Pan-STARRS 1	·	1.8 km	MPC · JPL
623195	2015 RP_{3}	—	September 19, 2007	Kitt Peak	Spacewatch	·	1.0 km	MPC · JPL
623196	2015 RR_{30}	—	September 30, 2011	Mount Lemmon	Mount Lemmon Survey	·	810 m	MPC · JPL
623197	2015 RZ_{30}	—	October 24, 2011	Haleakala	Pan-STARRS 1	·	1.4 km	MPC · JPL
623198	2015 RS_{31}	—	August 24, 2006	Socorro	LINEAR	·	1.8 km	MPC · JPL
623199	2015 RR_{32}	—	May 4, 2014	Mount Lemmon	Mount Lemmon Survey	·	1.7 km	MPC · JPL
623200	2015 RR_{36}	—	August 10, 2015	Črni Vrh	Mikuž, B.	·	470 m	MPC · JPL

== 623201–623300 ==
back to top

Designation			Discovery			Properties		Ref
Permanent	Provisional	Named after	Date	Site	Discoverer(s)	Category	Diam.	Ref
623201	2015 RK_{40}	—	September 25, 2006	Mount Lemmon	Mount Lemmon Survey	·	1.4 km	MPC · JPL
623202	2015 RR_{48}	—	September 26, 2006	Kitt Peak	Spacewatch	MRX	640 m	MPC · JPL
623203	2015 RE_{60}	—	September 29, 2011	Mount Lemmon	Mount Lemmon Survey	·	920 m	MPC · JPL
623204	2015 RL_{68}	—	September 10, 2015	Haleakala	Pan-STARRS 1	·	930 m	MPC · JPL
623205	2015 RT_{75}	—	September 25, 2006	Mount Lemmon	Mount Lemmon Survey	·	1.3 km	MPC · JPL
623206	2015 RN_{88}	—	April 30, 2014	Haleakala	Pan-STARRS 1	·	1.7 km	MPC · JPL
623207	2015 RR_{90}	—	December 18, 2007	Kitt Peak	Spacewatch	EUN	1.3 km	MPC · JPL
623208	2015 RJ_{91}	—	July 30, 2015	Haleakala	Pan-STARRS 1	·	1.6 km	MPC · JPL
623209	2015 RP_{91}	—	July 19, 2015	Haleakala	Pan-STARRS 1	·	1.6 km	MPC · JPL
623210	2015 RS_{91}	—	November 3, 2011	Mount Lemmon	Mount Lemmon Survey	·	1.6 km	MPC · JPL
623211	2015 RV_{91}	—	September 25, 2003	Palomar	NEAT	·	790 m	MPC · JPL
623212	2015 RT_{92}	—	September 21, 2011	La Sagra	OAM	EUN	1.0 km	MPC · JPL
623213	2015 RH_{96}	—	October 29, 2011	Haleakala	Pan-STARRS 1	ADE	1.6 km	MPC · JPL
623214	2015 RS_{100}	—	September 28, 2011	Kitt Peak	Spacewatch	·	680 m	MPC · JPL
623215	2015 RB_{103}	—	September 18, 2006	Catalina	CSS	·	1.4 km	MPC · JPL
623216	2015 RX_{104}	—	September 30, 2003	Kitt Peak	Spacewatch	·	840 m	MPC · JPL
623217	2015 RY_{117}	—	September 14, 2002	Anderson Mesa	LONEOS	EUN	1.2 km	MPC · JPL
623218	2015 RX_{120}	—	November 10, 1999	Kitt Peak	Spacewatch	·	700 m	MPC · JPL
623219	2015 RD_{121}	—	September 23, 2011	Kitt Peak	Spacewatch	·	1.0 km	MPC · JPL
623220	2015 RO_{123}	—	September 15, 2006	Kitt Peak	Spacewatch	·	1.5 km	MPC · JPL
623221	2015 RE_{157}	—	February 28, 2014	Haleakala	Pan-STARRS 1	·	1.0 km	MPC · JPL
623222	2015 RO_{204}	—	September 11, 2015	Haleakala	Pan-STARRS 1	·	1.3 km	MPC · JPL
623223	2015 RT_{205}	—	May 23, 2014	Haleakala	Pan-STARRS 1	GEF	960 m	MPC · JPL
623224	2015 RQ_{224}	—	May 28, 2014	Mount Lemmon	Mount Lemmon Survey	·	1.2 km	MPC · JPL
623225	2015 RA_{227}	—	May 23, 2014	Haleakala	Pan-STARRS 1	·	1.3 km	MPC · JPL
623226	2015 RV_{230}	—	October 17, 2006	Mount Lemmon	Mount Lemmon Survey	·	1.3 km	MPC · JPL
623227	2015 RD_{232}	—	October 3, 2006	Mount Lemmon	Mount Lemmon Survey	·	1.3 km	MPC · JPL
623228	2015 RM_{236}	—	June 22, 2014	Haleakala	Pan-STARRS 1	·	1.5 km	MPC · JPL
623229	2015 RN_{240}	—	November 25, 2006	Mount Lemmon	Mount Lemmon Survey	·	1.5 km	MPC · JPL
623230	2015 RK_{254}	—	November 13, 2006	Catalina	CSS	·	1.5 km	MPC · JPL
623231	2015 RC_{263}	—	October 31, 2011	Mount Lemmon	Mount Lemmon Survey	·	910 m	MPC · JPL
623232	2015 RS_{263}	—	October 23, 2011	Haleakala	Pan-STARRS 1	·	1.2 km	MPC · JPL
623233	2015 RE_{265}	—	October 23, 2011	Haleakala	Pan-STARRS 1	EUN	820 m	MPC · JPL
623234	2015 RQ_{266}	—	November 6, 2010	Mount Lemmon	Mount Lemmon Survey	EOS	1.4 km	MPC · JPL
623235	2015 RL_{270}	—	October 26, 2011	Haleakala	Pan-STARRS 1	·	1.2 km	MPC · JPL
623236	2015 RK_{275}	—	January 12, 2008	Kitt Peak	Spacewatch	·	1.3 km	MPC · JPL
623237	2015 RN_{275}	—	October 3, 2006	Kitt Peak	Spacewatch	·	1.5 km	MPC · JPL
623238	2015 RC_{288}	—	November 14, 2006	Kitt Peak	Spacewatch	·	1.5 km	MPC · JPL
623239	2015 RY_{303}	—	September 9, 2015	Haleakala	Pan-STARRS 1	·	3.0 km	MPC · JPL
623240	2015 RC_{304}	—	September 10, 2015	Haleakala	Pan-STARRS 1	·	1.4 km	MPC · JPL
623241	2015 SD_{6}	—	November 2, 2007	Kitt Peak	Spacewatch	(5)	750 m	MPC · JPL
623242	2015 SP_{10}	—	July 23, 2015	Haleakala	Pan-STARRS 1	·	1.5 km	MPC · JPL
623243	2015 SZ_{11}	—	October 17, 2006	Kitt Peak	Spacewatch	·	1.4 km	MPC · JPL
623244	2015 ST_{24}	—	November 24, 2011	Mount Lemmon	Mount Lemmon Survey	·	1.5 km	MPC · JPL
623245	2015 SC_{42}	—	September 23, 2015	Haleakala	Pan-STARRS 1	·	1.7 km	MPC · JPL
623246	2015 TX_{2}	—	October 1, 2015	Mount Lemmon	Mount Lemmon Survey	·	2.1 km	MPC · JPL
623247	2015 TF_{12}	—	July 25, 2015	Haleakala	Pan-STARRS 1	·	1.2 km	MPC · JPL
623248	2015 TZ_{17}	—	October 18, 2011	Haleakala	Pan-STARRS 1	EUN	970 m	MPC · JPL
623249	2015 TH_{18}	—	May 23, 2014	Haleakala	Pan-STARRS 1	EUN	1.0 km	MPC · JPL
623250	2015 TO_{23}	—	May 7, 2014	Haleakala	Pan-STARRS 1	GEF	850 m	MPC · JPL
623251	2015 TB_{48}	—	July 23, 2015	Haleakala	Pan-STARRS 1	·	1.4 km	MPC · JPL
623252	2015 TN_{59}	—	August 21, 2015	Haleakala	Pan-STARRS 1	·	1.6 km	MPC · JPL
623253	2015 TA_{60}	—	April 4, 2014	Kitt Peak	Spacewatch	·	1.6 km	MPC · JPL
623254	2015 TM_{65}	—	October 9, 2010	Mount Lemmon	Mount Lemmon Survey	KOR	830 m	MPC · JPL
623255	2015 TQ_{95}	—	October 28, 2010	Mount Lemmon	Mount Lemmon Survey	·	1.2 km	MPC · JPL
623256	2015 TG_{98}	—	October 8, 2015	Haleakala	Pan-STARRS 1	·	970 m	MPC · JPL
623257	2015 TO_{102}	—	October 2, 2006	Mount Lemmon	Mount Lemmon Survey	·	1.8 km	MPC · JPL
623258	2015 TM_{107}	—	October 8, 2015	Haleakala	Pan-STARRS 1	·	1.3 km	MPC · JPL
623259	2015 TN_{110}	—	May 31, 2008	Kitt Peak	Spacewatch	·	1.6 km	MPC · JPL
623260	2015 TY_{110}	—	May 4, 2005	Mauna Kea	Veillet, C.	·	1.1 km	MPC · JPL
623261	2015 TH_{117}	—	May 24, 2014	Haleakala	Pan-STARRS 1	·	1.1 km	MPC · JPL
623262	2015 TT_{127}	—	August 12, 2015	Haleakala	Pan-STARRS 1	THB	2.4 km	MPC · JPL
623263	2015 TT_{129}	—	July 5, 2005	Mount Lemmon	Mount Lemmon Survey	·	1.7 km	MPC · JPL
623264	2015 TF_{138}	—	August 12, 2015	Haleakala	Pan-STARRS 1	·	1.3 km	MPC · JPL
623265	2015 TO_{145}	—	July 23, 2015	Haleakala	Pan-STARRS 1	·	660 m	MPC · JPL
623266	2015 TD_{147}	—	October 25, 2011	Kitt Peak	Spacewatch	·	1.1 km	MPC · JPL
623267	2015 TQ_{156}	—	September 12, 2015	Haleakala	Pan-STARRS 1	·	1.0 km	MPC · JPL
623268	2015 TO_{170}	—	September 11, 2002	Haleakala	NEAT	·	1.3 km	MPC · JPL
623269	2015 TF_{171}	—	May 3, 2014	Mount Lemmon	Mount Lemmon Survey	·	1.3 km	MPC · JPL
623270	2015 TM_{173}	—	October 9, 2015	Haleakala	Pan-STARRS 1	·	2.1 km	MPC · JPL
623271	2015 TH_{179}	—	October 1, 1998	Kitt Peak	Spacewatch	·	1.1 km	MPC · JPL
623272	2015 TG_{180}	—	December 1, 2011	Haleakala	Pan-STARRS 1	EUN	960 m	MPC · JPL
623273	2015 TN_{181}	—	September 21, 2011	Kitt Peak	Spacewatch	·	1.6 km	MPC · JPL
623274	2015 TO_{182}	—	February 1, 2005	Catalina	CSS	EUN	1.3 km	MPC · JPL
623275	2015 TD_{184}	—	May 28, 2014	Haleakala	Pan-STARRS 1	·	1.6 km	MPC · JPL
623276	2015 TW_{187}	—	October 7, 2004	Kitt Peak	Spacewatch	·	1.9 km	MPC · JPL
623277	2015 TY_{188}	—	January 19, 2004	Kitt Peak	Spacewatch	·	1.1 km	MPC · JPL
623278	2015 TJ_{190}	—	February 26, 2009	Kitt Peak	Spacewatch	·	1.2 km	MPC · JPL
623279	2015 TP_{199}	—	August 12, 2015	Haleakala	Pan-STARRS 1	ADE	1.4 km	MPC · JPL
623280	2015 TM_{202}	—	September 26, 2011	Mayhill-ISON	L. Elenin	·	1.3 km	MPC · JPL
623281	2015 TO_{202}	—	September 27, 2011	Mount Lemmon	Mount Lemmon Survey	·	950 m	MPC · JPL
623282	2015 TH_{209}	—	July 25, 2015	Haleakala	Pan-STARRS 1	·	1.1 km	MPC · JPL
623283	2015 TP_{209}	—	December 30, 2007	Mount Lemmon	Mount Lemmon Survey	·	1.0 km	MPC · JPL
623284	2015 TY_{211}	—	October 14, 2010	Mount Lemmon	Mount Lemmon Survey	·	1.5 km	MPC · JPL
623285	2015 TN_{214}	—	October 19, 2006	Kitt Peak	Spacewatch	·	1.8 km	MPC · JPL
623286	2015 TW_{215}	—	September 25, 2006	Kitt Peak	Spacewatch	MRX	800 m	MPC · JPL
623287	2015 TM_{224}	—	December 31, 2007	Kitt Peak	Spacewatch	·	960 m	MPC · JPL
623288	2015 TO_{230}	—	November 18, 2011	Mount Lemmon	Mount Lemmon Survey	·	820 m	MPC · JPL
623289	2015 TL_{232}	—	September 14, 2002	Haleakala	NEAT	·	1.4 km	MPC · JPL
623290	2015 TE_{234}	—	December 6, 2010	Catalina	CSS	·	2.4 km	MPC · JPL
623291	2015 TR_{234}	—	November 18, 2001	Apache Point	SDSS Collaboration	·	1.8 km	MPC · JPL
623292	2015 TC_{239}	—	May 10, 2005	Mount Lemmon	Mount Lemmon Survey	·	3.0 km	MPC · JPL
623293	2015 TF_{241}	—	March 10, 2005	Mount Lemmon	Mount Lemmon Survey	·	1.1 km	MPC · JPL
623294	2015 TZ_{252}	—	October 22, 2006	Kitt Peak	Spacewatch	·	1.9 km	MPC · JPL
623295	2015 TE_{258}	—	July 4, 2010	Mount Lemmon	Mount Lemmon Survey	·	2.1 km	MPC · JPL
623296	2015 TH_{258}	—	September 20, 2015	Catalina	CSS	·	1.6 km	MPC · JPL
623297	2015 TO_{262}	—	September 11, 2002	Palomar	NEAT	·	1.5 km	MPC · JPL
623298	2015 TR_{275}	—	August 12, 2010	Kitt Peak	Spacewatch	AGN	840 m	MPC · JPL
623299	2015 TT_{301}	—	October 3, 2006	Mount Lemmon	Mount Lemmon Survey	·	1.4 km	MPC · JPL
623300	2015 TF_{302}	—	July 5, 2010	Kitt Peak	Spacewatch	·	1.3 km	MPC · JPL

== 623301–623400 ==
back to top

Designation			Discovery			Properties		Ref
Permanent	Provisional	Named after	Date	Site	Discoverer(s)	Category	Diam.	Ref
623301	2015 TG_{302}	—	October 25, 2011	Haleakala	Pan-STARRS 1	·	980 m	MPC · JPL
623302	2015 TJ_{312}	—	September 14, 2006	Catalina	CSS	·	1.6 km	MPC · JPL
623303	2015 TO_{312}	—	September 3, 2002	Palomar	NEAT	MAR	1.2 km	MPC · JPL
623304	2015 TO_{320}	—	May 8, 2014	Haleakala	Pan-STARRS 1	·	1.4 km	MPC · JPL
623305	2015 TU_{331}	—	February 21, 2007	Kitt Peak	Deep Ecliptic Survey	·	1.4 km	MPC · JPL
623306	2015 TD_{339}	—	September 21, 2011	Kitt Peak	Spacewatch	·	1.4 km	MPC · JPL
623307	2015 TD_{350}	—	August 5, 2002	Palomar	NEAT	·	1.2 km	MPC · JPL
623308	2015 TB_{353}	—	September 9, 2007	Mount Lemmon	Mount Lemmon Survey	·	840 m	MPC · JPL
623309	2015 TT_{353}	—	November 16, 2006	Kitt Peak	Spacewatch	·	1.4 km	MPC · JPL
623310	2015 TY_{356}	—	October 10, 2015	Haleakala	Pan-STARRS 1	·	1.6 km	MPC · JPL
623311	2015 TZ_{358}	—	October 12, 2010	Mount Lemmon	Mount Lemmon Survey	·	1.6 km	MPC · JPL
623312	2015 TP_{367}	—	July 28, 2014	Haleakala	Pan-STARRS 1	EOS	1.4 km	MPC · JPL
623313	2015 TM_{369}	—	April 6, 2008	Kitt Peak	Spacewatch	·	1.5 km	MPC · JPL
623314	2015 TQ_{374}	—	December 10, 2010	Mount Lemmon	Mount Lemmon Survey	·	1.7 km	MPC · JPL
623315	2015 TW_{376}	—	September 18, 2010	Mount Lemmon	Mount Lemmon Survey	·	1.3 km	MPC · JPL
623316	2015 TZ_{378}	—	May 21, 2014	Haleakala	Pan-STARRS 1	·	880 m	MPC · JPL
623317	2015 TD_{380}	—	October 10, 2015	Haleakala	Pan-STARRS 1	EUN	930 m	MPC · JPL
623318	2015 TG_{380}	—	December 6, 2011	Haleakala	Pan-STARRS 1	HNS	1.2 km	MPC · JPL
623319	2015 TL_{383}	—	October 10, 2015	Haleakala	Pan-STARRS 1	·	1.4 km	MPC · JPL
623320	2015 TU_{418}	—	October 8, 2015	Haleakala	Pan-STARRS 1	·	1.3 km	MPC · JPL
623321	2015 TJ_{434}	—	October 10, 2015	Haleakala	Pan-STARRS 1	KOR	800 m	MPC · JPL
623322	2015 UU_{1}	—	October 16, 2015	Mount Lemmon	Mount Lemmon Survey	KOR	890 m	MPC · JPL
623323	2015 UX_{6}	—	December 18, 2007	Mount Lemmon	Mount Lemmon Survey	·	1.3 km	MPC · JPL
623324	2015 UO_{16}	—	October 12, 2010	Mount Lemmon	Mount Lemmon Survey	·	1.6 km	MPC · JPL
623325	2015 UJ_{20}	—	October 14, 2015	Kitt Peak	Spacewatch	·	1.5 km	MPC · JPL
623326	2015 UX_{55}	—	November 23, 2011	Kitt Peak	Spacewatch	·	1.3 km	MPC · JPL
623327	2015 UL_{65}	—	October 21, 2015	Palomar	Palomar Transient Factory	(194)	1.9 km	MPC · JPL
623328	2015 UX_{74}	—	July 21, 2006	Mount Lemmon	Mount Lemmon Survey	·	1.3 km	MPC · JPL
623329	2015 UE_{82}	—	March 25, 2001	Kitt Peak	Deep Ecliptic Survey	·	450 m	MPC · JPL
623330	2015 UU_{89}	—	August 27, 2006	Kitt Peak	Spacewatch	·	1.3 km	MPC · JPL
623331	2015 UG_{90}	—	July 18, 2007	Mount Lemmon	Mount Lemmon Survey	·	3.4 km	MPC · JPL
623332	2015 VF_{6}	—	October 12, 2015	Catalina	CSS	·	1.6 km	MPC · JPL
623333	2015 VQ_{8}	—	May 2, 2006	Mount Lemmon	Mount Lemmon Survey	·	890 m	MPC · JPL
623334	2015 VC_{9}	—	September 11, 2010	Mount Lemmon	Mount Lemmon Survey	KOR	1.0 km	MPC · JPL
623335	2015 VZ_{12}	—	September 4, 2010	Kitt Peak	Spacewatch	·	1.1 km	MPC · JPL
623336	2015 VO_{13}	—	August 12, 2015	Haleakala	Pan-STARRS 1	·	1.5 km	MPC · JPL
623337	2015 VS_{15}	—	November 11, 2006	Mount Lemmon	Mount Lemmon Survey	HOF	1.9 km	MPC · JPL
623338	2015 VF_{21}	—	September 30, 2005	Mount Lemmon	Mount Lemmon Survey	·	1.7 km	MPC · JPL
623339	2015 VU_{27}	—	September 12, 2002	Palomar	NEAT	·	1.0 km	MPC · JPL
623340	2015 VL_{28}	—	November 1, 2015	Haleakala	Pan-STARRS 1	·	1.3 km	MPC · JPL
623341	2015 VF_{30}	—	November 8, 2007	Kitt Peak	Spacewatch	(5)	770 m	MPC · JPL
623342	2015 VH_{40}	—	September 12, 2010	La Sagra	OAM	·	1.8 km	MPC · JPL
623343	2015 VW_{52}	—	May 23, 2014	Haleakala	Pan-STARRS 1	·	1.0 km	MPC · JPL
623344	2015 VL_{60}	—	August 12, 2015	Haleakala	Pan-STARRS 1	(5)	910 m	MPC · JPL
623345	2015 VH_{85}	—	October 26, 2011	Haleakala	Pan-STARRS 1	·	1.1 km	MPC · JPL
623346	2015 VO_{88}	—	February 3, 2008	Altschwendt	W. Ries	·	1.4 km	MPC · JPL
623347	2015 VT_{90}	—	September 9, 2015	Haleakala	Pan-STARRS 1	(5)	1.0 km	MPC · JPL
623348	2015 VE_{104}	—	October 25, 2011	Haleakala	Pan-STARRS 1	EUN	800 m	MPC · JPL
623349	2015 VT_{105}	—	October 10, 2015	Haleakala	Pan-STARRS 1	·	1.7 km	MPC · JPL
623350	2015 VU_{109}	—	October 11, 2001	Palomar	NEAT	·	1.6 km	MPC · JPL
623351	2015 VR_{113}	—	October 15, 2004	Mount Lemmon	Mount Lemmon Survey	·	2.6 km	MPC · JPL
623352	2015 VT_{114}	—	January 16, 2008	Mount Lemmon	Mount Lemmon Survey	·	1.3 km	MPC · JPL
623353	2015 VX_{116}	—	October 11, 2015	XuYi	PMO NEO Survey Program	·	1.3 km	MPC · JPL
623354	2015 VU_{118}	—	March 26, 2009	Kitt Peak	Spacewatch	·	1.7 km	MPC · JPL
623355	2015 VN_{119}	—	August 29, 2006	Kitt Peak	Spacewatch	·	1.3 km	MPC · JPL
623356	2015 VT_{153}	—	November 1, 2015	Mount Lemmon	Mount Lemmon Survey	GAL	1.5 km	MPC · JPL
623357	2015 VO_{155}	—	June 15, 2009	Mount Lemmon	Mount Lemmon Survey	·	2.5 km	MPC · JPL
623358	2015 VX_{173}	—	November 10, 2015	Mount Lemmon	Mount Lemmon Survey	H	420 m	MPC · JPL
623359	2015 VP_{186}	—	November 7, 2015	Haleakala	Pan-STARRS 1	·	1.6 km	MPC · JPL
623360	2015 WZ_{13}	—	December 24, 2011	Mount Lemmon	Mount Lemmon Survey	MAR	1.0 km	MPC · JPL
623361	2015 WD_{15}	—	October 8, 2015	Haleakala	Pan-STARRS 1	·	1.2 km	MPC · JPL
623362	2015 XG_{18}	—	October 8, 2015	Haleakala	Pan-STARRS 1	·	1.6 km	MPC · JPL
623363	2015 XN_{36}	—	November 13, 2015	Mount Lemmon	Mount Lemmon Survey	·	1.5 km	MPC · JPL
623364	2015 XV_{50}	—	May 23, 2014	Haleakala	Pan-STARRS 1	·	970 m	MPC · JPL
623365	2015 XK_{52}	—	May 7, 2014	Haleakala	Pan-STARRS 1	·	1.3 km	MPC · JPL
623366	2015 XU_{63}	—	October 22, 2005	Kitt Peak	Spacewatch	·	1.4 km	MPC · JPL
623367	2015 XL_{66}	—	October 28, 2010	Mount Lemmon	Mount Lemmon Survey	KOR	930 m	MPC · JPL
623368	2015 XO_{71}	—	November 17, 2011	Mount Lemmon	Mount Lemmon Survey	·	670 m	MPC · JPL
623369	2015 XM_{75}	—	November 29, 1999	Kitt Peak	Spacewatch	·	1.7 km	MPC · JPL
623370	2015 XT_{108}	—	May 24, 2006	Mount Lemmon	Mount Lemmon Survey	·	1.1 km	MPC · JPL
623371	2015 XJ_{124}	—	October 1, 2003	Kitt Peak	Spacewatch	·	2.5 km	MPC · JPL
623372	2015 XU_{135}	—	September 30, 2009	Mount Lemmon	Mount Lemmon Survey	·	2.4 km	MPC · JPL
623373	2015 XK_{136}	—	May 28, 2014	Haleakala	Pan-STARRS 1	·	940 m	MPC · JPL
623374	2015 XU_{138}	—	April 16, 2013	Haleakala	Pan-STARRS 1	EOS	1.8 km	MPC · JPL
623375	2015 XV_{142}	—	December 4, 2015	Mount Lemmon	Mount Lemmon Survey	·	2.5 km	MPC · JPL
623376	2015 XP_{157}	—	September 3, 2010	Mount Lemmon	Mount Lemmon Survey	·	1.4 km	MPC · JPL
623377	2015 XQ_{162}	—	March 2, 2012	Kitt Peak	Spacewatch	EOS	1.5 km	MPC · JPL
623378	2015 XF_{163}	—	May 26, 2014	Haleakala	Pan-STARRS 1	·	1.5 km	MPC · JPL
623379	2015 XW_{169}	—	October 2, 2006	Catalina	CSS	·	1.9 km	MPC · JPL
623380	2015 XJ_{175}	—	September 28, 2009	Kitt Peak	Spacewatch	·	2.6 km	MPC · JPL
623381	2015 XP_{182}	—	September 19, 2009	Kitt Peak	Spacewatch	·	2.0 km	MPC · JPL
623382	2015 XK_{189}	—	November 2, 2015	Haleakala	Pan-STARRS 1	·	970 m	MPC · JPL
623383	2015 XT_{195}	—	October 28, 2014	Haleakala	Pan-STARRS 1	L5	9.0 km	MPC · JPL
623384	2015 XH_{221}	—	June 8, 2010	Kitt Peak	Spacewatch	·	1.5 km	MPC · JPL
623385	2015 XP_{222}	—	October 24, 2015	Mount Lemmon	Mount Lemmon Survey	MAR	1.2 km	MPC · JPL
623386	2015 XJ_{240}	—	November 25, 2005	Mount Lemmon	Mount Lemmon Survey	KOR	970 m	MPC · JPL
623387	2015 XS_{244}	—	August 14, 2002	Palomar	NEAT	·	1.2 km	MPC · JPL
623388	2015 XY_{249}	—	September 25, 2015	Haleakala	Pan-STARRS 1	·	1.1 km	MPC · JPL
623389	2015 XS_{250}	—	January 11, 2008	Kitt Peak	Spacewatch	·	1.5 km	MPC · JPL
623390	2015 XT_{258}	—	July 30, 2005	Palomar	NEAT	·	2.1 km	MPC · JPL
623391	2015 XM_{259}	—	April 9, 2008	Kitt Peak	Spacewatch	AGN	1.0 km	MPC · JPL
623392	2015 XX_{298}	—	November 22, 2015	Mount Lemmon	Mount Lemmon Survey	·	2.9 km	MPC · JPL
623393	2015 XQ_{308}	—	November 10, 2015	Mount Lemmon	Mount Lemmon Survey	·	1.3 km	MPC · JPL
623394	2015 XA_{331}	—	November 16, 2009	Mount Lemmon	Mount Lemmon Survey	HYG	2.1 km	MPC · JPL
623395	2015 XU_{331}	—	December 8, 2015	Haleakala	Pan-STARRS 1	·	1.9 km	MPC · JPL
623396	2015 XZ_{334}	—	September 18, 2006	Catalina	CSS	MIS	2.1 km	MPC · JPL
623397	2015 XP_{352}	—	November 6, 2002	Kitt Peak	Spacewatch	·	1.2 km	MPC · JPL
623398	2015 XU_{363}	—	October 31, 2010	Mount Lemmon	Mount Lemmon Survey	·	2.0 km	MPC · JPL
623399	2015 XX_{368}	—	October 26, 2014	Mount Lemmon	Mount Lemmon Survey	L5	7.1 km	MPC · JPL
623400	2015 XB_{369}	—	December 8, 2015	Mount Lemmon	Mount Lemmon Survey	TIR	2.4 km	MPC · JPL

== 623401–623500 ==
back to top

Designation			Discovery			Properties		Ref
Permanent	Provisional	Named after	Date	Site	Discoverer(s)	Category	Diam.	Ref
623401	2015 XE_{370}	—	December 8, 2015	Mount Lemmon	Mount Lemmon Survey	EUN	910 m	MPC · JPL
623402	2015 XR_{370}	—	June 24, 2014	Haleakala	Pan-STARRS 1	·	1.7 km	MPC · JPL
623403	2015 XA_{374}	—	October 2, 2006	Catalina	CSS	EUN	1.1 km	MPC · JPL
623404	2015 XV_{380}	—	September 19, 2001	Socorro	LINEAR	·	2.0 km	MPC · JPL
623405	2015 XC_{386}	—	December 4, 2015	Haleakala	Pan-STARRS 1	L5	7.0 km	MPC · JPL
623406	2015 XA_{390}	—	December 7, 2015	Haleakala	Pan-STARRS 1	·	2.1 km	MPC · JPL
623407	2015 XL_{395}	—	October 21, 2008	Mount Lemmon	Mount Lemmon Survey	·	2.2 km	MPC · JPL
623408	2015 XQ_{401}	—	October 27, 2009	Mount Lemmon	Mount Lemmon Survey	·	1.6 km	MPC · JPL
623409	2015 XD_{402}	—	July 16, 2013	Haleakala	Pan-STARRS 1	·	2.0 km	MPC · JPL
623410	2015 XH_{402}	—	October 1, 2008	Mount Lemmon	Mount Lemmon Survey	EOS	1.7 km	MPC · JPL
623411	2015 XZ_{403}	—	September 19, 2003	Kitt Peak	Spacewatch	·	1.8 km	MPC · JPL
623412	2015 XA_{408}	—	August 3, 2014	Haleakala	Pan-STARRS 1	·	1.2 km	MPC · JPL
623413	2015 XP_{411}	—	December 8, 2015	Haleakala	Pan-STARRS 1	EUP	3.2 km	MPC · JPL
623414	2015 XC_{417}	—	August 27, 2014	Haleakala	Pan-STARRS 1	·	2.0 km	MPC · JPL
623415	2015 XT_{487}	—	December 4, 2015	Mount Lemmon	Mount Lemmon Survey	·	1.7 km	MPC · JPL
623416	2015 XY_{488}	—	December 6, 2015	Mount Lemmon	Mount Lemmon Survey	·	1.9 km	MPC · JPL
623417	2015 YB_{6}	—	June 16, 2010	Kitt Peak	Spacewatch	·	1.8 km	MPC · JPL
623418	2015 YZ_{7}	—	August 6, 2010	Kitt Peak	Spacewatch	·	1.4 km	MPC · JPL
623419	2015 YX_{18}	—	November 21, 2006	Catalina	CSS	·	2.8 km	MPC · JPL
623420	2015 YK_{34}	—	December 18, 2015	Mount Lemmon	Mount Lemmon Survey	EOS	1.4 km	MPC · JPL
623421	2015 YS_{37}	—	November 22, 2015	Mount Lemmon	Mount Lemmon Survey	·	2.1 km	MPC · JPL
623422	2016 AU_{33}	—	March 31, 2003	Cerro Tololo	Deep Lens Survey	AST	1.8 km	MPC · JPL
623423	2016 AW_{78}	—	September 6, 2014	Mount Lemmon	Mount Lemmon Survey	·	1.7 km	MPC · JPL
623424	2016 AV_{104}	—	November 10, 2014	Haleakala	Pan-STARRS 1	·	2.4 km	MPC · JPL
623425	2016 AY_{132}	—	May 13, 2012	Catalina	CSS	·	2.9 km	MPC · JPL
623426	2016 AA_{138}	—	August 24, 2005	Palomar	NEAT	·	1.8 km	MPC · JPL
623427	2016 AT_{170}	—	January 9, 2016	Haleakala	Pan-STARRS 1	·	2.1 km	MPC · JPL
623428	2016 AT_{178}	—	September 23, 2008	Mount Lemmon	Mount Lemmon Survey	·	1.9 km	MPC · JPL
623429	2016 AP_{185}	—	August 15, 2013	Haleakala	Pan-STARRS 1	·	2.3 km	MPC · JPL
623430	2016 AH_{201}	—	January 3, 2016	Haleakala	Pan-STARRS 1	URS	2.4 km	MPC · JPL
623431	2016 AM_{210}	—	November 27, 1998	Kitt Peak	Spacewatch	·	1.9 km	MPC · JPL
623432	2016 AT_{220}	—	July 6, 2014	Haleakala	Pan-STARRS 1	·	1.4 km	MPC · JPL
623433	2016 AF_{229}	—	October 10, 2008	Mount Lemmon	Mount Lemmon Survey	·	2.6 km	MPC · JPL
623434	2016 AV_{237}	—	October 27, 2003	Kitt Peak	Spacewatch	·	2.4 km	MPC · JPL
623435	2016 AU_{239}	—	August 28, 2014	Haleakala	Pan-STARRS 1	·	1.9 km	MPC · JPL
623436	2016 AP_{248}	—	July 16, 2013	Haleakala	Pan-STARRS 1	·	2.2 km	MPC · JPL
623437	2016 AL_{251}	—	August 18, 2014	Haleakala	Pan-STARRS 1	·	1.0 km	MPC · JPL
623438	2016 AL_{264}	—	February 7, 2011	Mount Lemmon	Mount Lemmon Survey	·	1.6 km	MPC · JPL
623439	2016 BX	—	September 3, 2002	Palomar	NEAT	·	1.5 km	MPC · JPL
623440	2016 BJ_{27}	—	September 25, 1995	Kitt Peak	Spacewatch	TIN	1.0 km	MPC · JPL
623441	2016 BX_{33}	—	January 3, 2016	Haleakala	Pan-STARRS 1	·	2.3 km	MPC · JPL
623442	2016 BX_{36}	—	February 5, 2011	Mount Lemmon	Mount Lemmon Survey	·	2.6 km	MPC · JPL
623443	2016 BS_{61}	—	January 31, 2016	Mount Lemmon	Mount Lemmon Survey	BRA	1.4 km	MPC · JPL
623444	2016 BB_{92}	—	January 17, 2016	Haleakala	Pan-STARRS 1	·	2.3 km	MPC · JPL
623445	2016 BN_{96}	—	August 15, 2013	Haleakala	Pan-STARRS 1	·	2.1 km	MPC · JPL
623446	2016 BJ_{134}	—	January 31, 2016	Haleakala	Pan-STARRS 1	·	2.5 km	MPC · JPL
623447	2016 CL_{14}	—	February 2, 2006	Kitt Peak	Spacewatch	·	430 m	MPC · JPL
623448	2016 CU_{50}	—	November 25, 2014	Haleakala	Pan-STARRS 1	·	2.0 km	MPC · JPL
623449	2016 CO_{59}	—	November 14, 2014	Kitt Peak	Spacewatch	VER	2.3 km	MPC · JPL
623450	2016 CM_{91}	—	September 20, 2014	Haleakala	Pan-STARRS 1	EOS	1.5 km	MPC · JPL
623451	2016 CE_{99}	—	August 3, 2013	Haleakala	Pan-STARRS 1	EOS	1.4 km	MPC · JPL
623452	2016 CR_{108}	—	July 16, 2013	Haleakala	Pan-STARRS 1	·	2.1 km	MPC · JPL
623453	2016 CG_{173}	—	June 23, 2014	Mount Lemmon	Mount Lemmon Survey	·	1.8 km	MPC · JPL
623454	2016 CW_{184}	—	March 28, 2011	Mount Lemmon	Mount Lemmon Survey	·	2.6 km	MPC · JPL
623455	2016 CA_{205}	—	January 9, 2016	Haleakala	Pan-STARRS 1	·	3.1 km	MPC · JPL
623456	2016 CQ_{230}	—	May 30, 2006	Mount Lemmon	Mount Lemmon Survey	(69559)	2.9 km	MPC · JPL
623457	2016 CA_{245}	—	January 1, 2009	Mount Lemmon	Mount Lemmon Survey	·	3.2 km	MPC · JPL
623458	2016 CZ_{262}	—	November 19, 2008	Mount Lemmon	Mount Lemmon Survey	·	3.1 km	MPC · JPL
623459	2016 CC_{267}	—	February 7, 2008	Kitt Peak	Spacewatch	H	350 m	MPC · JPL
623460	2016 CS_{292}	—	February 2, 2016	Haleakala	Pan-STARRS 1	TEL	1.1 km	MPC · JPL
623461	2016 CG_{389}	—	May 26, 2011	Mount Lemmon	Mount Lemmon Survey	·	2.4 km	MPC · JPL
623462	2016 CA_{393}	—	February 5, 2016	Haleakala	Pan-STARRS 1	·	470 m	MPC · JPL
623463	2016 ED_{33}	—	February 3, 2016	Haleakala	Pan-STARRS 1	·	2.5 km	MPC · JPL
623464	2016 EW_{58}	—	January 30, 2006	Kitt Peak	Spacewatch	·	480 m	MPC · JPL
623465	2016 EZ_{59}	—	September 20, 2003	Kitt Peak	Spacewatch	EOS	1.5 km	MPC · JPL
623466	2016 EP_{60}	—	August 25, 2014	Haleakala	Pan-STARRS 1	·	540 m	MPC · JPL
623467	2016 EZ_{93}	—	September 4, 2014	Haleakala	Pan-STARRS 1	·	2.2 km	MPC · JPL
623468	2016 EZ_{120}	—	April 23, 2011	Haleakala	Pan-STARRS 1	·	2.5 km	MPC · JPL
623469	2016 EZ_{140}	—	March 10, 2016	Haleakala	Pan-STARRS 1	·	500 m	MPC · JPL
623470	2016 EC_{163}	—	May 22, 2001	Cerro Tololo	Deep Ecliptic Survey	THM	2.3 km	MPC · JPL
623471	2016 ED_{170}	—	April 7, 2013	Kitt Peak	Spacewatch	·	440 m	MPC · JPL
623472	2016 EZ_{178}	—	February 1, 2009	Kitt Peak	Spacewatch	·	530 m	MPC · JPL
623473	2016 EY_{271}	—	March 11, 2016	Mount Lemmon	Mount Lemmon Survey	·	500 m	MPC · JPL
623474	2016 EV_{279}	—	March 4, 2016	Haleakala	Pan-STARRS 1	·	570 m	MPC · JPL
623475	2016 EW_{282}	—	March 13, 2016	Haleakala	Pan-STARRS 1	·	780 m	MPC · JPL
623476	2016 FN	—	June 10, 2012	Haleakala	Pan-STARRS 1	·	1.5 km	MPC · JPL
623477	2016 FQ_{9}	—	July 1, 2013	Haleakala	Pan-STARRS 1	·	490 m	MPC · JPL
623478	2016 FD_{23}	—	September 11, 2007	Mount Lemmon	Mount Lemmon Survey	·	520 m	MPC · JPL
623479	2016 FD_{29}	—	March 4, 2016	Haleakala	Pan-STARRS 1	·	450 m	MPC · JPL
623480	2016 FD_{38}	—	February 22, 2009	Kitt Peak	Spacewatch	·	520 m	MPC · JPL
623481	2016 FK_{52}	—	September 3, 2010	Mount Lemmon	Mount Lemmon Survey	·	510 m	MPC · JPL
623482	2016 FL_{68}	—	March 30, 2016	Haleakala	Pan-STARRS 1	·	630 m	MPC · JPL
623483	2016 GV_{13}	—	October 15, 2007	Kitt Peak	Spacewatch	VER	2.5 km	MPC · JPL
623484	2016 GG_{28}	—	September 15, 2007	Mount Lemmon	Mount Lemmon Survey	·	2.4 km	MPC · JPL
623485	2016 GP_{32}	—	October 9, 2007	Mount Lemmon	Mount Lemmon Survey	·	2.1 km	MPC · JPL
623486	2016 GF_{43}	—	January 26, 2015	Haleakala	Pan-STARRS 1	·	2.7 km	MPC · JPL
623487	2016 GZ_{49}	—	October 9, 2007	Kitt Peak	Spacewatch	·	560 m	MPC · JPL
623488	2016 GL_{56}	—	September 29, 2003	Kitt Peak	Spacewatch	·	690 m	MPC · JPL
623489	2016 GX_{59}	—	March 3, 2009	Kitt Peak	Spacewatch	·	440 m	MPC · JPL
623490	2016 GL_{67}	—	September 18, 2007	Kitt Peak	Spacewatch	·	2.9 km	MPC · JPL
623491	2016 GU_{78}	—	September 21, 2003	Kitt Peak	Spacewatch	·	520 m	MPC · JPL
623492	2016 GC_{85}	—	August 13, 2010	Kitt Peak	Spacewatch	·	390 m	MPC · JPL
623493	2016 GT_{91}	—	October 15, 2012	Haleakala	Pan-STARRS 1	·	2.4 km	MPC · JPL
623494	2016 GX_{123}	—	September 25, 2006	Mount Lemmon	Mount Lemmon Survey	·	1.0 km	MPC · JPL
623495	2016 GO_{126}	—	January 20, 2009	Mount Lemmon	Mount Lemmon Survey	·	640 m	MPC · JPL
623496	2016 GH_{131}	—	March 4, 2016	Haleakala	Pan-STARRS 1	(2076)	610 m	MPC · JPL
623497	2016 GQ_{150}	—	January 3, 2009	Mount Lemmon	Mount Lemmon Survey	·	600 m	MPC · JPL
623498	2016 GO_{165}	—	October 9, 2007	Mount Lemmon	Mount Lemmon Survey	·	3.4 km	MPC · JPL
623499	2016 GK_{168}	—	January 17, 2015	Haleakala	Pan-STARRS 1	·	2.5 km	MPC · JPL
623500	2016 GK_{196}	—	May 1, 2006	Kitt Peak	Spacewatch	·	640 m	MPC · JPL

== 623501–623600 ==
back to top

Designation			Discovery			Properties		Ref
Permanent	Provisional	Named after	Date	Site	Discoverer(s)	Category	Diam.	Ref
623501	2016 GB_{198}	—	September 11, 2010	Siding Spring	SSS	·	700 m	MPC · JPL
623502	2016 GY_{210}	—	March 4, 2016	Haleakala	Pan-STARRS 1	·	460 m	MPC · JPL
623503	2016 GR_{226}	—	January 15, 2015	Haleakala	Pan-STARRS 1	·	2.7 km	MPC · JPL
623504	2016 GY_{229}	—	September 17, 2010	Mount Lemmon	Mount Lemmon Survey	·	600 m	MPC · JPL
623505	2016 GG_{246}	—	April 7, 2005	Mount Lemmon	Mount Lemmon Survey	VER	3.2 km	MPC · JPL
623506	2016 GX_{246}	—	May 24, 2003	Kitt Peak	Spacewatch	·	660 m	MPC · JPL
623507	2016 GJ_{251}	—	May 1, 2009	Mount Lemmon	Mount Lemmon Survey	·	570 m	MPC · JPL
623508	2016 GR_{283}	—	April 1, 2016	Haleakala	Pan-STARRS 1	PHO	820 m	MPC · JPL
623509	2016 HE_{4}	—	February 13, 2002	Kitt Peak	Spacewatch	·	540 m	MPC · JPL
623510	2016 JU_{22}	—	March 16, 2012	Mount Lemmon	Mount Lemmon Survey	·	860 m	MPC · JPL
623511	2016 JS_{31}	—	October 22, 2003	Kitt Peak	Deep Ecliptic Survey	·	630 m	MPC · JPL
623512	2016 LD_{8}	—	October 2, 2013	Haleakala	Pan-STARRS 1	·	530 m	MPC · JPL
623513	2016 LP_{24}	—	September 13, 2013	Mount Lemmon	Mount Lemmon Survey	·	740 m	MPC · JPL
623514	2016 LW_{30}	—	August 15, 2013	Haleakala	Pan-STARRS 1	·	430 m	MPC · JPL
623515	2016 LU_{57}	—	July 8, 2008	Mount Lemmon	Mount Lemmon Survey	·	1.2 km	MPC · JPL
623516	2016 LZ_{72}	—	June 8, 2016	Haleakala	Pan-STARRS 1	·	1.3 km	MPC · JPL
623517	2016 LJ_{80}	—	June 7, 2016	Haleakala	Pan-STARRS 1	·	630 m	MPC · JPL
623518	2016 MT_{4}	—	January 22, 2015	Haleakala	Pan-STARRS 1	PHO	580 m	MPC · JPL
623519	2016 NS_{3}	—	April 24, 2012	Haleakala	Pan-STARRS 1	·	830 m	MPC · JPL
623520	2016 NR_{6}	—	October 2, 2005	Palomar	NEAT	·	1.7 km	MPC · JPL
623521	2016 NU_{8}	—	July 27, 2005	Palomar	NEAT	·	1.1 km	MPC · JPL
623522	2016 NW_{10}	—	April 5, 2008	Mount Lemmon	Mount Lemmon Survey	·	790 m	MPC · JPL
623523	2016 ND_{11}	—	May 15, 2012	Haleakala	Pan-STARRS 1	·	950 m	MPC · JPL
623524	2016 NP_{12}	—	July 5, 2016	Mount Lemmon	Mount Lemmon Survey	·	870 m	MPC · JPL
623525	2016 NB_{18}	—	October 12, 2006	Palomar	NEAT	·	710 m	MPC · JPL
623526	2016 NZ_{19}	—	March 27, 2015	Haleakala	Pan-STARRS 1	·	1 km	MPC · JPL
623527	2016 NJ_{21}	—	September 17, 2009	Kitt Peak	Spacewatch	·	670 m	MPC · JPL
623528	2016 NS_{30}	—	September 14, 2009	Kitt Peak	Spacewatch	·	780 m	MPC · JPL
623529	2016 NW_{30}	—	September 28, 1998	Kitt Peak	Spacewatch	MAS	410 m	MPC · JPL
623530	2016 NC_{34}	—	June 8, 2016	Haleakala	Pan-STARRS 1	V	480 m	MPC · JPL
623531	2016 NO_{41}	—	March 27, 2008	Mount Lemmon	Mount Lemmon Survey	NYS	890 m	MPC · JPL
623532	2016 NO_{49}	—	May 8, 2008	Kitt Peak	Spacewatch	·	930 m	MPC · JPL
623533	2016 NS_{49}	—	August 15, 2009	Kitt Peak	Spacewatch	·	510 m	MPC · JPL
623534	2016 NU_{60}	—	July 7, 2016	Haleakala	Pan-STARRS 1	PHO	580 m	MPC · JPL
623535	2016 NF_{62}	—	July 11, 2016	Haleakala	Pan-STARRS 1	·	740 m	MPC · JPL
623536	2016 NZ_{105}	—	July 7, 2016	Haleakala	Pan-STARRS 1	·	960 m	MPC · JPL
623537	2016 NT_{110}	—	July 10, 2016	Mount Lemmon	Mount Lemmon Survey	·	1.0 km	MPC · JPL
623538	2016 NL_{111}	—	July 11, 2016	Haleakala	Pan-STARRS 1	·	1.1 km	MPC · JPL
623539	2016 NN_{111}	—	July 14, 2016	Haleakala	Pan-STARRS 1	·	860 m	MPC · JPL
623540	2016 NQ_{119}	—	July 5, 2016	Haleakala	Pan-STARRS 1	·	780 m	MPC · JPL
623541	2016 NS_{123}	—	July 12, 2016	Mount Lemmon	Mount Lemmon Survey	·	950 m	MPC · JPL
623542	2016 NO_{125}	—	July 7, 2016	Haleakala	Pan-STARRS 1	·	770 m	MPC · JPL
623543	2016 ND_{126}	—	July 11, 2016	Haleakala	Pan-STARRS 1	·	990 m	MPC · JPL
623544	2016 NU_{127}	—	July 9, 2016	Haleakala	Pan-STARRS 1	·	930 m	MPC · JPL
623545	2016 NH_{131}	—	July 12, 2016	Mount Lemmon	Mount Lemmon Survey	·	550 m	MPC · JPL
623546	2016 NP_{133}	—	September 28, 2006	Catalina	CSS	·	630 m	MPC · JPL
623547	2016 NC_{152}	—	July 4, 2016	Haleakala	Pan-STARRS 1	·	1.6 km	MPC · JPL
623548	2016 OJ_{4}	—	September 24, 2005	Kitt Peak	Spacewatch	NYS	930 m	MPC · JPL
623549	2016 OD_{9}	—	July 17, 2016	Haleakala	Pan-STARRS 1	·	1.1 km	MPC · JPL
623550	2016 OP_{10}	—	July 30, 2016	Haleakala	Pan-STARRS 1	·	1.0 km	MPC · JPL
623551	2016 PR_{4}	—	September 20, 2001	Kitt Peak	Spacewatch	·	750 m	MPC · JPL
623552	2016 PK_{13}	—	March 23, 2015	Kitt Peak	Spacewatch	·	920 m	MPC · JPL
623553	2016 PH_{14}	—	August 30, 2005	Kitt Peak	Spacewatch	NYS	860 m	MPC · JPL
623554	2016 PZ_{15}	—	September 23, 2009	Mount Lemmon	Mount Lemmon Survey	MAS	430 m	MPC · JPL
623555	2016 PJ_{22}	—	August 1, 2016	Haleakala	Pan-STARRS 1	PHO	500 m	MPC · JPL
623556	2016 PP_{24}	—	April 25, 2008	Kitt Peak	Spacewatch	V	430 m	MPC · JPL
623557	2016 PG_{41}	—	October 5, 2013	Haleakala	Pan-STARRS 1	·	580 m	MPC · JPL
623558	2016 PX_{45}	—	November 28, 2013	Mount Lemmon	Mount Lemmon Survey	·	640 m	MPC · JPL
623559	2016 PG_{47}	—	December 11, 2006	Kitt Peak	Spacewatch	·	610 m	MPC · JPL
623560	2016 PM_{51}	—	August 30, 2005	Kitt Peak	Spacewatch	·	940 m	MPC · JPL
623561	2016 PF_{62}	—	July 8, 2016	Haleakala	Pan-STARRS 1	·	990 m	MPC · JPL
623562	2016 PT_{76}	—	September 3, 2005	Palomar	NEAT	·	1.1 km	MPC · JPL
623563	2016 PE_{78}	—	August 13, 2016	Haleakala	Pan-STARRS 1	·	960 m	MPC · JPL
623564	2016 PT_{82}	—	August 2, 2016	Haleakala	Pan-STARRS 1	V	420 m	MPC · JPL
623565	2016 PC_{100}	—	December 22, 2008	Kitt Peak	Spacewatch	·	1.2 km	MPC · JPL
623566	2016 PL_{109}	—	August 2, 2016	Haleakala	Pan-STARRS 1	·	970 m	MPC · JPL
623567	2016 PQ_{122}	—	August 10, 2016	Haleakala	Pan-STARRS 1	·	880 m	MPC · JPL
623568	2016 PD_{130}	—	August 29, 2016	Mount Lemmon	Mount Lemmon Survey	NYS	900 m	MPC · JPL
623569	2016 PH_{152}	—	August 2, 2016	Haleakala	Pan-STARRS 1	·	930 m	MPC · JPL
623570	2016 PY_{155}	—	August 10, 2016	Haleakala	Pan-STARRS 1	·	830 m	MPC · JPL
623571	2016 PQ_{156}	—	August 14, 2012	Haleakala	Pan-STARRS 1	NYS	860 m	MPC · JPL
623572	2016 PZ_{157}	—	August 3, 2016	Haleakala	Pan-STARRS 1	·	810 m	MPC · JPL
623573	2016 QB_{3}	—	August 3, 2016	Haleakala	Pan-STARRS 1	·	720 m	MPC · JPL
623574	2016 QM_{6}	—	March 20, 2015	Haleakala	Pan-STARRS 1	·	1.2 km	MPC · JPL
623575	2016 QJ_{8}	—	September 27, 2009	Kitt Peak	Spacewatch	NYS	710 m	MPC · JPL
623576	2016 QG_{13}	—	September 2, 2008	Kitt Peak	Spacewatch	·	940 m	MPC · JPL
623577	2016 QZ_{13}	—	October 15, 2001	Apache Point	SDSS Collaboration	·	900 m	MPC · JPL
623578	2016 QQ_{17}	—	February 12, 2011	Mount Lemmon	Mount Lemmon Survey	V	530 m	MPC · JPL
623579	2016 QS_{36}	—	July 15, 2005	Mount Lemmon	Mount Lemmon Survey	·	1.0 km	MPC · JPL
623580	2016 QZ_{72}	—	August 25, 2012	Mount Lemmon	Mount Lemmon Survey	NYS	800 m	MPC · JPL
623581	2016 QK_{76}	—	June 14, 2016	Mount Lemmon	Mount Lemmon Survey	·	1 km	MPC · JPL
623582	2016 QN_{84}	—	July 7, 2016	Mount Lemmon	Mount Lemmon Survey	·	1.1 km	MPC · JPL
623583	2016 QT_{102}	—	August 1, 2016	Haleakala	Pan-STARRS 1	·	750 m	MPC · JPL
623584	2016 QM_{111}	—	August 28, 2016	Mount Lemmon	Mount Lemmon Survey	NYS	930 m	MPC · JPL
623585	2016 QO_{114}	—	August 28, 2016	Mount Lemmon	Mount Lemmon Survey	NYS	840 m	MPC · JPL
623586	2016 QZ_{115}	—	August 30, 2016	Haleakala	Pan-STARRS 1	·	850 m	MPC · JPL
623587	2016 RV_{3}	—	September 20, 2001	Socorro	LINEAR	·	820 m	MPC · JPL
623588	2016 RG_{5}	—	October 29, 2005	Mount Lemmon	Mount Lemmon Survey	·	860 m	MPC · JPL
623589	2016 RQ_{14}	—	September 15, 2009	Kitt Peak	Spacewatch	·	660 m	MPC · JPL
623590	2016 RC_{36}	—	November 20, 2008	Mount Lemmon	Mount Lemmon Survey	·	900 m	MPC · JPL
623591	2016 RO_{49}	—	October 17, 2012	Mount Lemmon	Mount Lemmon Survey	·	800 m	MPC · JPL
623592	2016 SH_{11}	—	August 25, 2012	Mount Lemmon	Mount Lemmon Survey	·	970 m	MPC · JPL
623593	2016 SV_{16}	—	October 25, 2011	Haleakala	Pan-STARRS 1	H	470 m	MPC · JPL
623594	2016 SU_{17}	—	August 29, 2005	Kitt Peak	Spacewatch	NYS	750 m	MPC · JPL
623595	2016 SM_{37}	—	October 23, 2009	Mount Lemmon	Mount Lemmon Survey	·	1.0 km	MPC · JPL
623596	2016 SS_{39}	—	May 21, 2012	Mount Lemmon	Mount Lemmon Survey	·	780 m	MPC · JPL
623597	2016 SS_{45}	—	October 14, 2009	Catalina	CSS	·	880 m	MPC · JPL
623598	2016 SU_{46}	—	February 24, 2015	Haleakala	Pan-STARRS 1	H	330 m	MPC · JPL
623599	2016 TB_{21}	—	April 11, 2008	Kitt Peak	Spacewatch	·	1.1 km	MPC · JPL
623600	2016 TO_{53}	—	October 8, 2016	Haleakala	Pan-STARRS 1	·	1.0 km	MPC · JPL

== 623601–623700 ==
back to top

Designation			Discovery			Properties		Ref
Permanent	Provisional	Named after	Date	Site	Discoverer(s)	Category	Diam.	Ref
623601	2016 TV_{73}	—	August 6, 2012	Haleakala	Pan-STARRS 1	·	940 m	MPC · JPL
623602	2016 TN_{93}	—	December 24, 2011	Catalina	CSS	H	500 m	MPC · JPL
623603	2016 TB_{96}	—	October 4, 2016	Mount Lemmon	Mount Lemmon Survey	·	1.1 km	MPC · JPL
623604	2016 TD_{123}	—	October 13, 2016	Mount Lemmon	Mount Lemmon Survey	·	1.8 km	MPC · JPL
623605	2016 TP_{138}	—	October 7, 2016	Haleakala	Pan-STARRS 1	·	1.1 km	MPC · JPL
623606	2016 TW_{138}	—	October 7, 2016	Haleakala	Pan-STARRS 1	·	850 m	MPC · JPL
623607	2016 TS_{147}	—	October 7, 2016	Haleakala	Pan-STARRS 1	·	1.0 km	MPC · JPL
623608	2016 TW_{148}	—	October 7, 2016	Haleakala	Pan-STARRS 1	WIT	680 m	MPC · JPL
623609	2016 TN_{154}	—	October 9, 2016	Haleakala	Pan-STARRS 1	·	870 m	MPC · JPL
623610	2016 UU_{19}	—	October 21, 2009	Mount Lemmon	Mount Lemmon Survey	·	770 m	MPC · JPL
623611	2016 UN_{35}	—	December 13, 2012	Mount Lemmon	Mount Lemmon Survey	·	1.6 km	MPC · JPL
623612	2016 UE_{39}	—	May 8, 2006	Mount Lemmon	Mount Lemmon Survey	·	1.3 km	MPC · JPL
623613	2016 UA_{51}	—	October 7, 2016	Haleakala	Pan-STARRS 1	·	910 m	MPC · JPL
623614	2016 US_{59}	—	October 25, 2016	Haleakala	Pan-STARRS 1	·	1.1 km	MPC · JPL
623615	2016 UP_{97}	—	October 22, 2012	Haleakala	Pan-STARRS 1	·	1.1 km	MPC · JPL
623616	2016 UT_{109}	—	November 22, 2012	Kitt Peak	Spacewatch	·	1.2 km	MPC · JPL
623617	2016 UR_{127}	—	September 23, 2012	Mount Lemmon	Mount Lemmon Survey	NYS	860 m	MPC · JPL
623618	2016 UN_{138}	—	January 20, 2009	Mount Lemmon	Mount Lemmon Survey	·	1.3 km	MPC · JPL
623619	2016 UQ_{141}	—	June 20, 2012	Mount Lemmon	Mount Lemmon Survey	·	1.9 km	MPC · JPL
623620	2016 UL_{150}	—	October 22, 2016	Mount Lemmon	Mount Lemmon Survey	MAR	790 m	MPC · JPL
623621	2016 UN_{248}	—	October 27, 2016	Mount Lemmon	Mount Lemmon Survey	EUN	880 m	MPC · JPL
623622	2016 UZ_{259}	—	October 26, 2016	Kitt Peak	Spacewatch	(5)	890 m	MPC · JPL
623623	2016 UN_{261}	—	October 28, 2016	Haleakala	Pan-STARRS 1	·	760 m	MPC · JPL
623624	2016 VH_{4}	—	May 13, 2009	Kitt Peak	Spacewatch	·	1.0 km	MPC · JPL
623625	2016 VX_{8}	—	October 28, 2008	Kitt Peak	Spacewatch	·	550 m	MPC · JPL
623626	2016 VY_{9}	—	April 19, 2015	Mount Lemmon	Mount Lemmon Survey	·	770 m	MPC · JPL
623627	2016 VU_{59}	—	November 5, 2016	Haleakala	Pan-STARRS 1	EUN	1.1 km	MPC · JPL
623628	2016 VJ_{60}	—	November 6, 2016	Mount Lemmon	Mount Lemmon Survey	·	1.4 km	MPC · JPL
623629	2016 WQ_{5}	—	October 3, 1999	Socorro	LINEAR	·	1.3 km	MPC · JPL
623630	2016 WM_{11}	—	November 17, 2012	Nogales	M. Schwartz, P. R. Holvorcem	·	1.8 km	MPC · JPL
623631	2016 WN_{21}	—	August 25, 2012	Haleakala	Pan-STARRS 1	·	930 m	MPC · JPL
623632	2016 WW_{26}	—	November 23, 2016	Mount Lemmon	Mount Lemmon Survey	·	1.2 km	MPC · JPL
623633	2016 WR_{28}	—	September 22, 2008	Kitt Peak	Spacewatch	·	1.1 km	MPC · JPL
623634	2016 WG_{47}	—	January 4, 2013	Mount Lemmon	Mount Lemmon Survey	·	1.4 km	MPC · JPL
623635	2016 WU_{47}	—	October 13, 2012	Catalina	CSS	·	1.1 km	MPC · JPL
623636	2016 XS_{13}	—	June 26, 2015	Haleakala	Pan-STARRS 1	·	1.4 km	MPC · JPL
623637	2016 XY_{13}	—	October 19, 2011	Kitt Peak	Spacewatch	·	2.0 km	MPC · JPL
623638	2016 YK_{2}	—	October 22, 2003	Kitt Peak	Spacewatch	EUN	770 m	MPC · JPL
623639	2016 YY_{17}	—	December 27, 2016	Mount Lemmon	Mount Lemmon Survey	L5	8.5 km	MPC · JPL
623640	2016 YQ_{19}	—	December 25, 2016	Haleakala	Pan-STARRS 1	EOS	1.4 km	MPC · JPL
623641	2017 AB_{7}	—	July 28, 2011	Siding Spring	SSS	·	1.5 km	MPC · JPL
623642	2017 AG_{7}	—	September 4, 2010	Mount Lemmon	Mount Lemmon Survey	EUN	1.3 km	MPC · JPL
623643	2017 AP_{10}	—	November 21, 2015	Mount Lemmon	Mount Lemmon Survey	·	2.2 km	MPC · JPL
623644	2017 AQ_{10}	—	January 27, 2012	Mount Lemmon	Mount Lemmon Survey	GAL	1.5 km	MPC · JPL
623645	2017 AX_{23}	—	January 19, 2013	Mount Lemmon	Mount Lemmon Survey	·	1.4 km	MPC · JPL
623646	2017 AW_{30}	—	January 3, 2017	Haleakala	Pan-STARRS 1	HNS	1.2 km	MPC · JPL
623647	2017 AH_{44}	—	January 3, 2017	Haleakala	Pan-STARRS 1	·	900 m	MPC · JPL
623648	2017 AE_{49}	—	January 2, 2017	Haleakala	Pan-STARRS 1	·	1.3 km	MPC · JPL
623649	2017 BH	—	October 10, 2007	Mount Lemmon	Mount Lemmon Survey	·	1.2 km	MPC · JPL
623650	2017 BW_{18}	—	July 19, 2015	Haleakala	Pan-STARRS 1	·	1.6 km	MPC · JPL
623651	2017 BZ_{44}	—	January 5, 2013	Mount Lemmon	Mount Lemmon Survey	·	760 m	MPC · JPL
623652	2017 BQ_{47}	—	February 11, 2004	Kitt Peak	Spacewatch	HNS	1.0 km	MPC · JPL
623653	2017 BE_{62}	—	October 27, 2016	Haleakala	Pan-STARRS 1	BAR	1.1 km	MPC · JPL
623654	2017 BV_{75}	—	May 23, 2014	Haleakala	Pan-STARRS 1	·	1.0 km	MPC · JPL
623655	2017 BY_{80}	—	June 30, 2014	Haleakala	Pan-STARRS 1	·	1.7 km	MPC · JPL
623656	2017 BA_{83}	—	September 27, 2006	Catalina	CSS	·	1.7 km	MPC · JPL
623657	2017 BE_{94}	—	January 27, 2017	Mount Lemmon	Mount Lemmon Survey	HNS	910 m	MPC · JPL
623658	2017 BB_{104}	—	July 24, 2015	Haleakala	Pan-STARRS 1	ADE	1.7 km	MPC · JPL
623659	2017 BL_{106}	—	July 27, 2015	Haleakala	Pan-STARRS 1	·	1.0 km	MPC · JPL
623660	2017 BC_{116}	—	August 3, 2015	Haleakala	Pan-STARRS 1	·	1.1 km	MPC · JPL
623661	2017 BR_{119}	—	April 23, 2007	Mount Lemmon	Mount Lemmon Survey	·	2.3 km	MPC · JPL
623662	2017 BH_{157}	—	January 20, 2017	Haleakala	Pan-STARRS 1	·	2.1 km	MPC · JPL
623663	2017 BD_{169}	—	January 29, 2017	Haleakala	Pan-STARRS 1	EOS	1.4 km	MPC · JPL
623664	2017 BF_{203}	—	January 31, 2017	Haleakala	Pan-STARRS 1	·	1.3 km	MPC · JPL
623665	2017 CP_{6}	—	September 9, 2015	Haleakala	Pan-STARRS 1	·	1.3 km	MPC · JPL
623666	2017 CV_{19}	—	February 16, 2013	Mount Lemmon	Mount Lemmon Survey	·	1.1 km	MPC · JPL
623667	2017 DA_{5}	—	November 13, 2015	Mount Lemmon	Mount Lemmon Survey	·	2.4 km	MPC · JPL
623668	2017 DV_{21}	—	August 28, 2014	Haleakala	Pan-STARRS 1	·	2.2 km	MPC · JPL
623669	2017 DK_{25}	—	February 18, 2017	Haleakala	Pan-STARRS 1	·	1.3 km	MPC · JPL
623670	2017 DT_{31}	—	February 16, 2004	Kitt Peak	Spacewatch	HNS	1.5 km	MPC · JPL
623671	2017 DF_{40}	—	October 3, 2015	Haleakala	Pan-STARRS 1	·	1.1 km	MPC · JPL
623672	2017 DO_{45}	—	October 24, 2015	Mount Lemmon	Mount Lemmon Survey	·	1.4 km	MPC · JPL
623673	2017 DK_{52}	—	November 22, 2014	Haleakala	Pan-STARRS 1	L5	9.1 km	MPC · JPL
623674	2017 DV_{57}	—	April 15, 2013	Haleakala	Pan-STARRS 1	EOS	2.0 km	MPC · JPL
623675	2017 DN_{103}	—	September 23, 2014	Mount Lemmon	Mount Lemmon Survey	EOS	1.4 km	MPC · JPL
623676	2017 DQ_{145}	—	February 22, 2017	Haleakala	Pan-STARRS 1	·	1.6 km	MPC · JPL
623677	2017 DF_{146}	—	February 21, 2017	Haleakala	Pan-STARRS 1	·	1.8 km	MPC · JPL
623678	2017 DR_{146}	—	February 25, 2017	Haleakala	Pan-STARRS 1	EOS	1.3 km	MPC · JPL
623679	2017 EO_{6}	—	November 28, 2016	Haleakala	Pan-STARRS 1	·	1.6 km	MPC · JPL
623680	2017 EJ_{13}	—	March 4, 2017	Haleakala	Pan-STARRS 1	H	410 m	MPC · JPL
623681	2017 ED_{43}	—	March 7, 2017	Mount Lemmon	Mount Lemmon Survey	·	2.2 km	MPC · JPL
623682	2017 FD_{4}	—	February 24, 2006	Kitt Peak	Spacewatch	LIX	3.4 km	MPC · JPL
623683	2017 FT_{9}	—	January 17, 2007	Kitt Peak	Spacewatch	BRA	1.4 km	MPC · JPL
623684	2017 FR_{12}	—	October 3, 2008	Mount Lemmon	Mount Lemmon Survey	·	2.1 km	MPC · JPL
623685	2017 FU_{13}	—	March 28, 2012	Kitt Peak	Spacewatch	·	1.9 km	MPC · JPL
623686	2017 FT_{24}	—	May 1, 2012	Mount Lemmon	Mount Lemmon Survey	·	2.3 km	MPC · JPL
623687	2017 FS_{26}	—	October 8, 2010	Kitt Peak	Spacewatch	EOS	2.1 km	MPC · JPL
623688	2017 FY_{57}	—	April 2, 2013	Kitt Peak	Spacewatch	·	1.5 km	MPC · JPL
623689	2017 FR_{60}	—	August 4, 2013	Haleakala	Pan-STARRS 1	·	2.1 km	MPC · JPL
623690	2017 FW_{106}	—	November 17, 2009	Kitt Peak	Spacewatch	·	1.8 km	MPC · JPL
623691	2017 FA_{130}	—	April 20, 2012	Kitt Peak	Spacewatch	THM	2.0 km	MPC · JPL
623692	2017 FE_{149}	—	August 20, 2014	Haleakala	Pan-STARRS 1	HOF	1.9 km	MPC · JPL
623693	2017 FJ_{158}	—	September 14, 2007	Kitt Peak	Spacewatch	·	2.4 km	MPC · JPL
623694	2017 FH_{162}	—	December 6, 2015	Mount Lemmon	Mount Lemmon Survey	·	1.9 km	MPC · JPL
623695	2017 FT_{163}	—	March 19, 2017	Mount Lemmon	Mount Lemmon Survey	·	2.0 km	MPC · JPL
623696	2017 FF_{168}	—	March 19, 2017	Haleakala	Pan-STARRS 1	EOS	1.3 km	MPC · JPL
623697	2017 FM_{188}	—	March 27, 2017	Mount Lemmon	Mount Lemmon Survey	·	1.5 km	MPC · JPL
623698	2017 GB_{1}	—	January 17, 2007	Kitt Peak	Spacewatch	TIN	1.1 km	MPC · JPL
623699	2017 GT_{7}	—	June 23, 2015	Haleakala	Pan-STARRS 1	H	540 m	MPC · JPL
623700	2017 GJ_{10}	—	May 15, 2012	Haleakala	Pan-STARRS 1	EOS	1.7 km	MPC · JPL

== 623701–623800 ==
back to top

Designation			Discovery			Properties		Ref
Permanent	Provisional	Named after	Date	Site	Discoverer(s)	Category	Diam.	Ref
623701	2017 HZ_{12}	—	July 30, 2013	Kitt Peak	Spacewatch	EOS	1.6 km	MPC · JPL
623702	2017 HW_{60}	—	September 3, 2013	Haleakala	Pan-STARRS 1	·	2.3 km	MPC · JPL
623703	2017 HK_{91}	—	April 26, 2017	Haleakala	Pan-STARRS 1	·	2.3 km	MPC · JPL
623704	2017 OP_{8}	—	September 24, 2014	Kitt Peak	Spacewatch	·	430 m	MPC · JPL
623705	2017 OU_{10}	—	July 1, 2017	Haleakala	Pan-STARRS 1	·	470 m	MPC · JPL
623706	2017 OO_{42}	—	October 25, 2014	Kitt Peak	Spacewatch	·	530 m	MPC · JPL
623707	2017 OS_{49}	—	April 9, 2010	Mount Lemmon	Mount Lemmon Survey	·	540 m	MPC · JPL
623708	2017 OA_{54}	—	August 27, 2001	Kitt Peak	Spacewatch	3:2	5.1 km	MPC · JPL
623709	2017 PF_{16}	—	May 14, 2008	Mount Lemmon	Mount Lemmon Survey	3:2 · SHU	4.6 km	MPC · JPL
623710	2017 QG_{1}	—	October 5, 2014	Mount Lemmon	Mount Lemmon Survey	·	510 m	MPC · JPL
623711	2017 QU_{31}	—	September 19, 2011	Haleakala	Pan-STARRS 1	·	3.5 km	MPC · JPL
623712	2017 QS_{67}	—	August 31, 2017	Mount Lemmon	Mount Lemmon Survey	·	3.9 km	MPC · JPL
623713	2017 RJ_{29}	—	October 23, 2008	Mount Lemmon	Mount Lemmon Survey	·	810 m	MPC · JPL
623714	2017 RL_{64}	—	September 12, 2007	Mount Lemmon	Mount Lemmon Survey	·	570 m	MPC · JPL
623715	2017 RB_{87}	—	September 10, 2004	Kitt Peak	Spacewatch	·	510 m	MPC · JPL
623716	2017 SL_{43}	—	June 27, 2007	Kitt Peak	Spacewatch	·	610 m	MPC · JPL
623717	2017 SF_{57}	—	April 21, 2006	Kitt Peak	Spacewatch	·	470 m	MPC · JPL
623718	2017 SF_{63}	—	June 14, 2010	Mount Lemmon	Mount Lemmon Survey	·	620 m	MPC · JPL
623719	2017 SY_{79}	—	February 4, 2009	Mount Lemmon	Mount Lemmon Survey	·	2.0 km	MPC · JPL
623720	2017 SA_{98}	—	February 23, 2012	Mount Lemmon	Mount Lemmon Survey	·	580 m	MPC · JPL
623721	2017 SS_{157}	—	September 22, 2017	Haleakala	Pan-STARRS 1	·	490 m	MPC · JPL
623722	2017 SU_{199}	—	September 24, 2017	Haleakala	Pan-STARRS 1	·	440 m	MPC · JPL
623723	2017 SW_{223}	—	September 24, 2017	Haleakala	Pan-STARRS 1	·	620 m	MPC · JPL
623724	2017 TC_{13}	—	October 12, 2007	Mount Lemmon	Mount Lemmon Survey	·	500 m	MPC · JPL
623725	2017 UA_{3}	—	August 4, 2017	Haleakala	Pan-STARRS 1	·	670 m	MPC · JPL
623726	2017 UB_{16}	—	October 21, 2014	Kitt Peak	Spacewatch	·	530 m	MPC · JPL
623727	2017 UU_{88}	—	October 21, 2017	Mount Lemmon	Mount Lemmon Survey	·	680 m	MPC · JPL
623728	2017 UZ_{108}	—	October 21, 2017	Mount Lemmon	Mount Lemmon Survey	·	650 m	MPC · JPL
623729	2017 VP_{5}	—	October 7, 2001	Palomar	NEAT	·	620 m	MPC · JPL
623730	2017 VZ_{30}	—	May 18, 2013	Mount Lemmon	Mount Lemmon Survey	·	550 m	MPC · JPL
623731	2017 VK_{39}	—	September 22, 2017	Haleakala	Pan-STARRS 1	·	480 m	MPC · JPL
623732	2017 WB_{7}	—	August 29, 2006	Kitt Peak	Spacewatch	·	630 m	MPC · JPL
623733	2017 XS_{9}	—	February 25, 2012	Mount Lemmon	Mount Lemmon Survey	V	480 m	MPC · JPL
623734	2017 XF_{27}	—	May 16, 2005	Mount Lemmon	Mount Lemmon Survey	·	900 m	MPC · JPL
623735	2017 XJ_{27}	—	October 30, 2010	Piszkés-tető	K. Sárneczky, Z. Kuli	V	380 m	MPC · JPL
623736	2017 XW_{36}	—	January 17, 2015	Mount Lemmon	Mount Lemmon Survey	·	900 m	MPC · JPL
623737	2017 XA_{40}	—	May 9, 2016	Mount Lemmon	Mount Lemmon Survey	·	560 m	MPC · JPL
623738	2017 XN_{42}	—	January 16, 2011	Mount Lemmon	Mount Lemmon Survey	MAS	720 m	MPC · JPL
623739	2017 XD_{47}	—	January 20, 2015	Mount Lemmon	Mount Lemmon Survey	·	840 m	MPC · JPL
623740	2017 XA_{61}	—	November 5, 2007	Mount Lemmon	Mount Lemmon Survey	·	630 m	MPC · JPL
623741	2017 XM_{75}	—	December 12, 2017	Haleakala	Pan-STARRS 1	·	890 m	MPC · JPL
623742	2017 XD_{77}	—	December 10, 2017	Haleakala	Pan-STARRS 1	V	460 m	MPC · JPL
623743	2017 YB_{5}	—	October 8, 2010	Catalina	CSS	·	580 m	MPC · JPL
623744	2017 YG_{31}	—	May 20, 2015	Cerro Tololo-DECam	DECam	·	800 m	MPC · JPL
623745	2018 AS_{10}	—	October 8, 2012	Haleakala	Pan-STARRS 1	·	1.3 km	MPC · JPL
623746	2018 AZ_{14}	—	July 19, 2006	Mauna Kea	P. A. Wiegert, D. Subasinghe	·	2.0 km	MPC · JPL
623747	2018 AX_{31}	—	January 15, 2018	Haleakala	Pan-STARRS 1	·	1.3 km	MPC · JPL
623748	2018 BL_{19}	—	January 20, 2018	Haleakala	Pan-STARRS 1	·	2.4 km	MPC · JPL
623749	2018 DQ_{5}	—	February 23, 2018	Mount Lemmon	Mount Lemmon Survey	·	1.4 km	MPC · JPL
623750	2018 DA_{7}	—	February 23, 2018	Mount Lemmon	Mount Lemmon Survey	KOR	1.3 km	MPC · JPL
623751	2018 DX_{11}	—	February 25, 2018	Mount Lemmon	Mount Lemmon Survey	·	1.5 km	MPC · JPL
623752	2018 ES_{9}	—	October 15, 2007	Kitt Peak	Spacewatch	·	1.9 km	MPC · JPL
623753	2018 FL_{15}	—	November 15, 2006	Mount Lemmon	Mount Lemmon Survey	KOR	1.1 km	MPC · JPL
623754	2018 FJ_{26}	—	September 13, 2007	Mount Lemmon	Mount Lemmon Survey	·	980 m	MPC · JPL
623755	2018 FK_{27}	—	October 24, 2011	Haleakala	Pan-STARRS 1	·	1.4 km	MPC · JPL
623756	2018 FD_{50}	—	March 19, 2018	Mount Lemmon	Mount Lemmon Survey	HOF	2.1 km	MPC · JPL
623757	2018 GH_{9}	—	March 17, 2013	Mount Lemmon	Mount Lemmon Survey	·	1.2 km	MPC · JPL
623758	2018 HK_{7}	—	April 19, 2018	Mount Lemmon	Mount Lemmon Survey	·	1.7 km	MPC · JPL
623759	2018 LG_{9}	—	June 10, 2018	Haleakala	Pan-STARRS 1	H	360 m	MPC · JPL
623760	2018 LN_{11}	—	September 22, 2006	Catalina	CSS	·	1.6 km	MPC · JPL
623761	2018 LM_{21}	—	June 15, 2018	Haleakala	Pan-STARRS 1	·	2.3 km	MPC · JPL
623762	2018 MY	—	June 5, 2002	Kitt Peak	Spacewatch	(5)	1.1 km	MPC · JPL
623763	2018 ND_{11}	—	November 20, 2014	Mount Lemmon	Mount Lemmon Survey	·	1.6 km	MPC · JPL
623764	2018 NO_{12}	—	February 12, 2016	Haleakala	Pan-STARRS 1	·	3.5 km	MPC · JPL
623765	2018 NR_{12}	—	September 16, 2003	Kitt Peak	Spacewatch	·	1.6 km	MPC · JPL
623766	2018 NX_{13}	—	January 26, 2015	Haleakala	Pan-STARRS 1	THB	2.8 km	MPC · JPL
623767	2018 NV_{21}	—	July 12, 2018	Haleakala	Pan-STARRS 2	·	2.5 km	MPC · JPL
623768	2018 PD_{73}	—	August 12, 2018	Haleakala	Pan-STARRS 1	H	440 m	MPC · JPL
623769	2018 RA_{5}	—	September 10, 2018	Mount Lemmon	Mount Lemmon Survey	APO	490 m	MPC · JPL
623770	2018 RK_{49}	—	September 8, 2018	Mount Lemmon	Mount Lemmon Survey	·	2.5 km	MPC · JPL
623771	2018 SR_{4}	—	February 13, 1999	Kitt Peak	Spacewatch	·	3.3 km	MPC · JPL
623772	2018 US_{4}	—	August 25, 1995	Kitt Peak	Spacewatch	THB	2.2 km	MPC · JPL
623773	2018 VL_{2}	—	March 18, 2017	Haleakala	Pan-STARRS 1	H	550 m	MPC · JPL
623774	2018 VO_{18}	—	November 29, 2013	Mount Lemmon	Mount Lemmon Survey	·	2.5 km	MPC · JPL
623775	2018 VR_{18}	—	September 13, 2007	Mount Lemmon	Mount Lemmon Survey	·	2.2 km	MPC · JPL
623776	2018 VF_{26}	—	May 1, 2017	Mount Lemmon	Mount Lemmon Survey	H	480 m	MPC · JPL
623777	2018 VH_{59}	—	November 29, 2013	Mount Lemmon	Mount Lemmon Survey	LUT	3.8 km	MPC · JPL
623778	2018 XV_{17}	—	September 18, 2012	Nogales	M. Schwartz, P. R. Holvorcem	·	3.6 km	MPC · JPL
623779	2019 AS_{39}	—	April 21, 2013	Mount Lemmon	Mount Lemmon Survey	·	440 m	MPC · JPL
623780	2019 AK_{51}	—	March 16, 2013	Kitt Peak	Spacewatch	·	520 m	MPC · JPL
623781	2019 DK_{3}	—	July 17, 2006	Lulin	LUSS	·	540 m	MPC · JPL
623782	2019 GS_{8}	—	March 10, 2008	Kitt Peak	Spacewatch	·	780 m	MPC · JPL
623783	2019 GZ_{12}	—	September 6, 2005	Anderson Mesa	LONEOS	ERI	1.2 km	MPC · JPL
623784	2019 GV_{49}	—	April 2, 2019	Haleakala	Pan-STARRS 1	·	950 m	MPC · JPL
623785	2019 GZ_{50}	—	April 3, 2019	Haleakala	Pan-STARRS 1	·	1.3 km	MPC · JPL
623786	2019 GQ_{51}	—	April 4, 2019	Haleakala	Pan-STARRS 1	·	910 m	MPC · JPL
623787	2019 GA_{56}	—	March 30, 2015	Haleakala	Pan-STARRS 1	·	840 m	MPC · JPL
623788	2019 GM_{70}	—	April 2, 2019	Haleakala	Pan-STARRS 1	·	590 m	MPC · JPL
623789	2019 GQ_{130}	—	January 4, 2014	Haleakala	Pan-STARRS 1	·	930 m	MPC · JPL
623790	2019 HE_{4}	—	April 1, 2012	Mount Lemmon	Mount Lemmon Survey	·	890 m	MPC · JPL
623791	2019 HR_{6}	—	February 10, 2008	Kitt Peak	Spacewatch	·	860 m	MPC · JPL
623792	2019 JG_{30}	—	July 14, 2016	Haleakala	Pan-STARRS 1	·	630 m	MPC · JPL
623793	2019 JJ_{32}	—	January 2, 2011	Mount Lemmon	Mount Lemmon Survey	·	970 m	MPC · JPL
623794	2019 JT_{57}	—	May 1, 2019	Haleakala	Pan-STARRS 1	·	720 m	MPC · JPL
623795	2019 JZ_{61}	—	May 1, 2019	Haleakala	Pan-STARRS 1	·	990 m	MPC · JPL
623796	2019 JJ_{65}	—	May 1, 2019	Haleakala	Pan-STARRS 1	·	1.2 km	MPC · JPL
623797	2019 JY_{68}	—	May 7, 2019	Haleakala	Pan-STARRS 1	HYG	2.0 km	MPC · JPL
623798	2019 KW_{9}	—	March 4, 2014	Cerro Tololo	DECam	·	890 m	MPC · JPL
623799	2019 MR_{1}	—	August 29, 2003	Haleakala	NEAT	·	950 m	MPC · JPL
623800	2019 MY_{8}	—	January 27, 2012	Mount Lemmon	Mount Lemmon Survey	·	1.3 km	MPC · JPL

== 623801–623900 ==
back to top

Designation			Discovery			Properties		Ref
Permanent	Provisional	Named after	Date	Site	Discoverer(s)	Category	Diam.	Ref
623801	2019 NP_{21}	—	September 12, 2006	Catalina	CSS	(1547)	1.5 km	MPC · JPL
623802	2019 OF	—	January 11, 2012	Mount Lemmon	Mount Lemmon Survey	·	1.3 km	MPC · JPL
623803	2019 OE_{20}	—	May 16, 2010	Mount Lemmon	Mount Lemmon Survey	·	1.1 km	MPC · JPL
623804	2019 PY_{11}	—	June 13, 2005	Mount Lemmon	Mount Lemmon Survey	·	1.8 km	MPC · JPL
623805	2019 QP_{9}	—	February 8, 2011	Mount Lemmon	Mount Lemmon Survey	·	1.8 km	MPC · JPL
623806	2019 RH_{7}	—	September 1, 2013	Haleakala	Pan-STARRS 1	·	2.7 km	MPC · JPL
623807	2019 RM_{36}	—	September 6, 2019	Haleakala	Pan-STARRS 1	·	2.8 km	MPC · JPL
623808	2019 SG_{16}	—	May 8, 2014	Haleakala	Pan-STARRS 1	·	1.4 km	MPC · JPL
623809	2019 SK_{27}	—	December 28, 2011	Mount Lemmon	Mount Lemmon Survey	·	1.5 km	MPC · JPL
623810	2019 SE_{108}	—	September 19, 2012	Mount Lemmon	Mount Lemmon Survey	·	2.9 km	MPC · JPL
623811	2019 TX_{22}	—	September 16, 2006	Catalina	CSS	JUN	720 m	MPC · JPL
623812	2019 TX_{33}	—	October 8, 2019	Haleakala	Pan-STARRS 1	T_{j} (2.9)	3.5 km	MPC · JPL
623813	2019 UZ_{17}	—	August 12, 2013	Kitt Peak	Spacewatch	·	2.4 km	MPC · JPL
623814	2019 VG_{5}	—	October 11, 2010	Catalina	CSS	JUN	860 m	MPC · JPL
623815	2020 BB_{68}	—	August 30, 2008	Charleston	R. Holmes	3:2	5.1 km	MPC · JPL
623816	2020 BE_{91}	—	January 21, 2015	Haleakala	Pan-STARRS 1	·	1.8 km	MPC · JPL
623817	2020 FF_{9}	—	March 22, 2020	Haleakala	Pan-STARRS 1	L5	7.9 km	MPC · JPL
623818	2020 PB_{29}	—	August 14, 2020	Haleakala	Pan-STARRS 2	·	1.7 km	MPC · JPL
623819	2020 QL_{48}	—	August 27, 2009	Kitt Peak	Spacewatch	·	800 m	MPC · JPL
623820	2020 TH_{10}	—	September 9, 2015	Haleakala	Pan-STARRS 1	·	1.6 km	MPC · JPL
623821	2020 WV_{12}	—	October 23, 2006	Mount Lemmon	Mount Lemmon Survey	TIN	730 m	MPC · JPL
623822	2021 CP_{12}	—	November 9, 2013	Haleakala	Pan-STARRS 1	·	2.8 km	MPC · JPL
623823	2021 TU_{79}	—	February 3, 2008	Kitt Peak	Spacewatch	NYS	770 m	MPC · JPL
623824	2021 UO_{48}	—	November 17, 2008	Kitt Peak	Spacewatch	·	1.1 km	MPC · JPL
623825	2021 VW_{37}	—	October 24, 2011	Haleakala	Pan-STARRS 1	·	400 m	MPC · JPL
623826 Alekseyvarkin	2022 WY_{16}	Alekseyvarkin	November 24, 2022	La Palma-Liverpool	Romanov, F. D.	·	970 m	MPC · JPL
623827 Nikandrilyich	2022 WY_{17}	Nikandrilyich	November 23, 2022	La Palma-Liverpool	Romanov, F. D.	(895)	2.0 km	MPC · JPL
623828	1994 SS_{3}	—	September 28, 1994	Kitt Peak	Spacewatch	·	440 m	MPC · JPL
623829	1995 DX_{3}	—	February 21, 1995	Kitt Peak	Spacewatch	·	1.2 km	MPC · JPL
623830	1995 OB_{9}	—	July 27, 1995	Kitt Peak	Spacewatch	·	990 m	MPC · JPL
623831	1995 OC_{13}	—	July 22, 1995	Kitt Peak	Spacewatch	·	810 m	MPC · JPL
623832	1995 QH_{5}	—	August 22, 1995	Kitt Peak	Spacewatch	·	660 m	MPC · JPL
623833	1995 SF_{24}	—	September 19, 1995	Kitt Peak	Spacewatch	NYS	880 m	MPC · JPL
623834	1995 SV_{65}	—	September 17, 1995	Kitt Peak	Spacewatch	AGN	860 m	MPC · JPL
623835	1995 ST_{82}	—	September 23, 1995	Kitt Peak	Spacewatch	·	1.6 km	MPC · JPL
623836	1995 SZ_{85}	—	September 26, 1995	Kitt Peak	Spacewatch	·	590 m	MPC · JPL
623837	1995 SB_{91}	—	September 18, 1995	Kitt Peak	Spacewatch	·	680 m	MPC · JPL
623838	1995 TA_{9}	—	October 1, 1995	Kitt Peak	Spacewatch	·	670 m	MPC · JPL
623839	1995 UG_{30}	—	October 20, 1995	Kitt Peak	Spacewatch	·	1.3 km	MPC · JPL
623840	1995 UR_{36}	—	October 21, 1995	Kitt Peak	Spacewatch	·	570 m	MPC · JPL
623841	1995 UJ_{59}	—	May 26, 2015	Haleakala	Pan-STARRS 1	·	850 m	MPC · JPL
623842	1995 UJ_{69}	—	October 19, 1995	Kitt Peak	Spacewatch	·	520 m	MPC · JPL
623843	1995 US_{79}	—	October 24, 1995	Kitt Peak	Spacewatch	EUN	680 m	MPC · JPL
623844	1995 UX_{81}	—	October 28, 1995	Kitt Peak	Spacewatch	·	820 m	MPC · JPL
623845	1995 UD_{84}	—	March 1, 2012	Mount Lemmon	Mount Lemmon Survey	·	1.8 km	MPC · JPL
623846	1995 VU_{6}	—	November 14, 1995	Kitt Peak	Spacewatch	·	760 m	MPC · JPL
623847	1995 WL_{34}	—	November 20, 1995	Kitt Peak	Spacewatch	NYS	640 m	MPC · JPL
623848	1996 JB_{15}	—	May 13, 1996	Kitt Peak	Spacewatch	·	550 m	MPC · JPL
623849	1996 RR_{22}	—	September 11, 1996	Kitt Peak	Spacewatch	·	1.3 km	MPC · JPL
623850	1996 TX_{11}	—	October 11, 1996	Kitt Peak	Spacewatch	·	500 m	MPC · JPL
623851	1996 VP_{10}	—	November 4, 1996	Kitt Peak	Spacewatch	·	1.5 km	MPC · JPL
623852	1996 XF_{7}	—	December 1, 1996	Kitt Peak	Spacewatch	·	570 m	MPC · JPL
623853	1997 LF_{3}	—	June 5, 1997	Kitt Peak	Spacewatch	·	490 m	MPC · JPL
623854	1997 SM_{13}	—	September 28, 1997	Kitt Peak	Spacewatch	·	610 m	MPC · JPL
623855	1997 SY_{22}	—	September 29, 1997	Kitt Peak	Spacewatch	·	1.2 km	MPC · JPL
623856	1997 UM_{16}	—	October 23, 1997	Kitt Peak	Spacewatch	·	1.7 km	MPC · JPL
623857	1997 VS_{9}	—	August 30, 2002	Kitt Peak	Spacewatch	·	1.6 km	MPC · JPL
623858	1997 WC_{6}	—	November 23, 1997	Kitt Peak	Spacewatch	THM	2.0 km	MPC · JPL
623859	1998 OO_{4}	—	July 26, 1998	Kitt Peak	Spacewatch	·	840 m	MPC · JPL
623860	1998 RB_{21}	—	September 14, 1998	Kitt Peak	Spacewatch	·	1.8 km	MPC · JPL
623861	1998 RU_{48}	—	September 14, 1998	Socorro	LINEAR	·	2.0 km	MPC · JPL
623862	1998 RL_{81}	—	September 14, 1998	Kitt Peak	Spacewatch	MAS	520 m	MPC · JPL
623863	1998 SF	—	September 16, 1998	Kitt Peak	Spacewatch	·	420 m	MPC · JPL
623864	1998 SC_{18}	—	September 17, 1998	Kitt Peak	Spacewatch	·	1.0 km	MPC · JPL
623865	1998 SH_{31}	—	September 20, 1998	Kitt Peak	Spacewatch	·	2.7 km	MPC · JPL
623866	1998 SF_{177}	—	September 19, 1998	Apache Point	SDSS Collaboration	KOR	1.3 km	MPC · JPL
623867	1998 SU_{177}	—	September 19, 1998	Apache Point	SDSS Collaboration	·	730 m	MPC · JPL
623868	1998 SS_{178}	—	September 19, 1998	Apache Point	SDSS Collaboration	·	650 m	MPC · JPL
623869	1998 SZ_{178}	—	August 26, 2012	Haleakala	Pan-STARRS 1	·	850 m	MPC · JPL
623870	1998 SH_{181}	—	September 19, 1998	Apache Point	SDSS Collaboration	·	980 m	MPC · JPL
623871	1998 TT_{38}	—	October 13, 1998	Kitt Peak	Spacewatch	·	2.7 km	MPC · JPL
623872	1998 VK_{57}	—	November 11, 2009	Kitt Peak	Spacewatch	·	710 m	MPC · JPL
623873	1998 WF_{36}	—	November 19, 1998	Kitt Peak	Spacewatch	NYS	780 m	MPC · JPL
623874	1998 WH_{43}	—	November 19, 1998	Kitt Peak	Spacewatch	(5)	1.2 km	MPC · JPL
623875	1998 WQ_{46}	—	November 27, 1998	Kitt Peak	Spacewatch	·	810 m	MPC · JPL
623876	1998 XX_{24}	—	December 12, 1998	Kitt Peak	Spacewatch	·	1.0 km	MPC · JPL
623877	1998 YO_{19}	—	December 25, 1998	Kitt Peak	Spacewatch	·	1.1 km	MPC · JPL
623878	1999 AB_{32}	—	January 15, 1999	Kitt Peak	Spacewatch	TIR	2.0 km	MPC · JPL
623879	1999 CJ_{129}	—	June 26, 2015	Haleakala	Pan-STARRS 1	·	900 m	MPC · JPL
623880	1999 CK_{143}	—	February 8, 1999	Mauna Kea	Anderson, J., Veillet, C.	·	510 m	MPC · JPL
623881	1999 EY_{9}	—	March 14, 1999	Kitt Peak	Spacewatch	NYS	1.2 km	MPC · JPL
623882	1999 FL_{99}	—	May 4, 2006	Mount Lemmon	Mount Lemmon Survey	·	520 m	MPC · JPL
623883	1999 FU_{99}	—	September 10, 2010	Kitt Peak	Spacewatch	EUN	880 m	MPC · JPL
623884	1999 FM_{100}	—	September 16, 2012	Kitt Peak	Spacewatch	·	890 m	MPC · JPL
623885	1999 HM_{13}	—	April 17, 1999	Kitt Peak	Spacewatch	·	2.8 km	MPC · JPL
623886	1999 RF_{178}	—	September 14, 1999	Kitt Peak	Spacewatch	·	920 m	MPC · JPL
623887	1999 RR_{250}	—	September 5, 1999	Kitt Peak	Spacewatch	·	980 m	MPC · JPL
623888	1999 RS_{260}	—	July 5, 2016	Haleakala	Pan-STARRS 1	·	610 m	MPC · JPL
623889	1999 SH_{29}	—	January 26, 2011	Mount Lemmon	Mount Lemmon Survey	·	570 m	MPC · JPL
623890	1999 TV_{42}	—	October 3, 1999	Kitt Peak	Spacewatch	·	1.4 km	MPC · JPL
623891	1999 TK_{43}	—	October 3, 1999	Kitt Peak	Spacewatch	·	1.3 km	MPC · JPL
623892	1999 TM_{47}	—	October 4, 1999	Kitt Peak	Spacewatch	·	1.1 km	MPC · JPL
623893	1999 TS_{77}	—	October 10, 1999	Kitt Peak	Spacewatch	·	1.5 km	MPC · JPL
623894	1999 TB_{79}	—	October 4, 1999	Kitt Peak	Spacewatch	·	1.2 km	MPC · JPL
623895	1999 TV_{83}	—	October 12, 1999	Kitt Peak	Spacewatch	·	940 m	MPC · JPL
623896	1999 TE_{84}	—	October 3, 1999	Kitt Peak	Spacewatch	·	1.4 km	MPC · JPL
623897	1999 TF_{309}	—	October 6, 1999	Kitt Peak	Spacewatch	·	1.5 km	MPC · JPL
623898	1999 TW_{316}	—	September 14, 1999	Catalina	CSS	·	1.3 km	MPC · JPL
623899	1999 TJ_{317}	—	October 11, 1999	Kitt Peak	Spacewatch	·	550 m	MPC · JPL
623900	1999 TS_{328}	—	October 10, 1999	Kitt Peak	Spacewatch	KOR	1.3 km	MPC · JPL

== 623901–624000 ==
back to top

Designation			Discovery			Properties		Ref
Permanent	Provisional	Named after	Date	Site	Discoverer(s)	Category	Diam.	Ref
623901	1999 TH_{336}	—	October 20, 1999	Kitt Peak	Spacewatch	·	1.4 km	MPC · JPL
623902	1999 TM_{336}	—	October 9, 1999	Kitt Peak	Spacewatch	·	820 m	MPC · JPL
623903	1999 TR_{339}	—	October 23, 2003	Kitt Peak	Spacewatch	·	850 m	MPC · JPL
623904	1999 TK_{340}	—	October 13, 1999	Apache Point	SDSS Collaboration	·	1.4 km	MPC · JPL
623905	1999 UM_{18}	—	October 9, 1999	Socorro	LINEAR	·	950 m	MPC · JPL
623906	1999 UP_{65}	—	September 12, 2007	Mount Lemmon	Mount Lemmon Survey	·	1.0 km	MPC · JPL
623907	1999 UG_{66}	—	September 23, 2015	Haleakala	Pan-STARRS 1	·	2.0 km	MPC · JPL
623908	1999 VL_{75}	—	November 5, 1999	Kitt Peak	Spacewatch	·	620 m	MPC · JPL
623909	1999 VT_{118}	—	November 9, 1999	Kitt Peak	Spacewatch	·	2.2 km	MPC · JPL
623910	1999 VJ_{121}	—	November 4, 1999	Kitt Peak	Spacewatch	·	940 m	MPC · JPL
623911	1999 WW_{20}	—	November 2, 2010	Kitt Peak	Spacewatch	·	2.3 km	MPC · JPL
623912	1999 WY_{24}	—	November 28, 1999	Kitt Peak	Spacewatch	H	330 m	MPC · JPL
623913	1999 WJ_{28}	—	September 28, 2009	Mount Lemmon	Mount Lemmon Survey	·	1.1 km	MPC · JPL
623914	1999 WB_{29}	—	February 26, 2014	Haleakala	Pan-STARRS 1	·	1.0 km	MPC · JPL
623915	1999 XM_{147}	—	December 7, 1999	Kitt Peak	Spacewatch	·	1.5 km	MPC · JPL
623916	1999 XP_{150}	—	December 8, 1999	Kitt Peak	Spacewatch	·	580 m	MPC · JPL
623917	1999 XV_{150}	—	December 8, 1999	Kitt Peak	Spacewatch	·	650 m	MPC · JPL
623918	1999 YS_{30}	—	December 16, 1999	Kitt Peak	Spacewatch	EUN	880 m	MPC · JPL
623919	2000 AB_{228}	—	January 13, 2000	Kitt Peak	Spacewatch	·	750 m	MPC · JPL
623920	2000 AM_{253}	—	January 7, 2000	Kitt Peak	Spacewatch	·	960 m	MPC · JPL
623921	2000 AU_{258}	—	September 24, 2011	Haleakala	Pan-STARRS 1	RAF	680 m	MPC · JPL
623922	2000 BL_{41}	—	January 30, 2000	Kitt Peak	Spacewatch	·	960 m	MPC · JPL
623923	2000 BC_{53}	—	December 7, 2013	Mount Lemmon	Mount Lemmon Survey	·	680 m	MPC · JPL
623924	2000 BK_{53}	—	January 29, 2000	Kitt Peak	Spacewatch	·	710 m	MPC · JPL
623925	2000 CX_{68}	—	February 1, 2000	Kitt Peak	Spacewatch	·	1.3 km	MPC · JPL
623926	2000 CJ_{106}	—	February 8, 2000	Kitt Peak	Spacewatch	·	960 m	MPC · JPL
623927	2000 CP_{119}	—	March 29, 2009	Kitt Peak	Spacewatch	·	1 km	MPC · JPL
623928	2000 CU_{120}	—	July 7, 2014	Haleakala	Pan-STARRS 1	THM	1.6 km	MPC · JPL
623929	2000 CL_{151}	—	August 31, 2005	Kitt Peak	Spacewatch	MAS	570 m	MPC · JPL
623930	2000 CQ_{151}	—	March 10, 2011	Kitt Peak	Spacewatch	·	740 m	MPC · JPL
623931	2000 CT_{151}	—	August 20, 2014	Haleakala	Pan-STARRS 1	·	2.4 km	MPC · JPL
623932	2000 CG_{152}	—	January 9, 2007	Kitt Peak	Spacewatch	·	740 m	MPC · JPL
623933	2000 CS_{153}	—	November 7, 2015	Mount Lemmon	Mount Lemmon Survey	·	860 m	MPC · JPL
623934	2000 CF_{154}	—	May 14, 2004	Kitt Peak	Spacewatch	NYS	760 m	MPC · JPL
623935	2000 CQ_{154}	—	October 22, 2003	Kitt Peak	Spacewatch	·	1.5 km	MPC · JPL
623936	2000 CS_{156}	—	August 16, 2014	Haleakala	Pan-STARRS 1	·	990 m	MPC · JPL
623937	2000 ED_{138}	—	March 11, 2000	Socorro	LINEAR	PHO	780 m	MPC · JPL
623938	2000 EF_{193}	—	March 3, 2000	Socorro	LINEAR	·	1.3 km	MPC · JPL
623939	2000 EW_{196}	—	August 28, 2005	Kitt Peak	Spacewatch	·	1.0 km	MPC · JPL
623940	2000 EE_{203}	—	March 5, 2000	Cerro Tololo	Deep Lens Survey	EOS	1.4 km	MPC · JPL
623941	2000 EH_{209}	—	October 20, 2007	Catalina	CSS	·	1.2 km	MPC · JPL
623942	2000 FC_{52}	—	March 29, 2000	Kitt Peak	Spacewatch	·	640 m	MPC · JPL
623943	2000 FZ_{52}	—	March 30, 2000	Kitt Peak	Spacewatch	·	2.3 km	MPC · JPL
623944	2000 FP_{74}	—	April 14, 2008	Mount Lemmon	Mount Lemmon Survey	H	460 m	MPC · JPL
623945	2000 GW_{120}	—	April 5, 2000	Kitt Peak	Spacewatch	NYS	670 m	MPC · JPL
623946	2000 HA_{106}	—	April 10, 2013	Haleakala	Pan-STARRS 1	·	1.2 km	MPC · JPL
623947	2000 HK_{106}	—	February 21, 2017	Haleakala	Pan-STARRS 1	·	990 m	MPC · JPL
623948	2000 JM_{95}	—	January 1, 2008	Kitt Peak	Spacewatch	·	1.2 km	MPC · JPL
623949	2000 JO_{95}	—	April 11, 2011	Mount Lemmon	Mount Lemmon Survey	·	1 km	MPC · JPL
623950	2000 JY_{96}	—	October 17, 2012	Mount Lemmon	Mount Lemmon Survey	H	470 m	MPC · JPL
623951	2000 KB_{3}	—	May 24, 2000	Kitt Peak	Spacewatch	H	490 m	MPC · JPL
623952	2000 NF_{6}	—	July 3, 2000	Kitt Peak	Spacewatch	·	530 m	MPC · JPL
623953	2000 OG_{66}	—	July 29, 2000	Cerro Tololo	Deep Ecliptic Survey	·	1.3 km	MPC · JPL
623954	2000 OL_{66}	—	July 30, 2000	Cerro Tololo	Deep Ecliptic Survey	·	1.4 km	MPC · JPL
623955	2000 OH_{71}	—	October 12, 2007	Mount Lemmon	Mount Lemmon Survey	·	400 m	MPC · JPL
623956	2000 OL_{72}	—	March 5, 2014	Kitt Peak	Spacewatch	·	1.0 km	MPC · JPL
623957	2000 PW_{7}	—	August 3, 2000	Socorro	LINEAR	·	1.0 km	MPC · JPL
623958	2000 PB_{31}	—	December 31, 2005	Kitt Peak	Spacewatch	·	1.0 km	MPC · JPL
623959	2000 PC_{34}	—	September 3, 2008	Kitt Peak	Spacewatch	MAS	560 m	MPC · JPL
623960	2000 QB_{56}	—	August 25, 2000	Socorro	LINEAR	·	550 m	MPC · JPL
623961	2000 QB_{130}	—	August 2, 2000	Kitt Peak	Spacewatch	·	1.7 km	MPC · JPL
623962	2000 QM_{199}	—	August 29, 2000	Socorro	LINEAR	·	1.5 km	MPC · JPL
623963	2000 QP_{233}	—	August 25, 2000	Cerro Tololo	Deep Ecliptic Survey	3:2 · SHU	4.1 km	MPC · JPL
623964	2000 QJ_{235}	—	August 26, 2000	Cerro Tololo	Deep Ecliptic Survey	·	2.3 km	MPC · JPL
623965	2000 QR_{237}	—	August 27, 2000	Cerro Tololo	Deep Ecliptic Survey	·	2.1 km	MPC · JPL
623966	2000 QD_{256}	—	March 10, 2016	Haleakala	Pan-STARRS 1	·	490 m	MPC · JPL
623967	2000 QT_{257}	—	August 27, 2000	Cerro Tololo	Deep Ecliptic Survey	·	500 m	MPC · JPL
623968	2000 QL_{258}	—	September 9, 2015	Haleakala	Pan-STARRS 1	·	920 m	MPC · JPL
623969	2000 QY_{259}	—	November 10, 2016	Haleakala	Pan-STARRS 1	L5	5.7 km	MPC · JPL
623970	2000 RE_{108}	—	January 14, 2008	Kitt Peak	Spacewatch	·	2.9 km	MPC · JPL
623971	2000 RU_{108}	—	September 20, 2014	Haleakala	Pan-STARRS 1	·	1.5 km	MPC · JPL
623972	2000 RK_{109}	—	July 13, 2013	Haleakala	Pan-STARRS 1	·	480 m	MPC · JPL
623973	2000 RN_{109}	—	June 7, 2013	Haleakala	Pan-STARRS 1	MRX	910 m	MPC · JPL
623974	2000 SZ_{231}	—	September 25, 2000	Socorro	LINEAR	·	1.8 km	MPC · JPL
623975	2000 SR_{272}	—	September 28, 2000	Socorro	LINEAR	·	1.5 km	MPC · JPL
623976	2000 SJ_{378}	—	October 3, 2013	Haleakala	Pan-STARRS 1	·	430 m	MPC · JPL
623977	2000 SK_{379}	—	September 3, 2013	Mount Lemmon	Mount Lemmon Survey	·	560 m	MPC · JPL
623978	2000 SD_{383}	—	September 19, 2000	Kitt Peak	Spacewatch	·	1.5 km	MPC · JPL
623979	2000 TD_{8}	—	September 21, 2000	Kitt Peak	Spacewatch	·	1.2 km	MPC · JPL
623980	2000 TE_{75}	—	February 9, 2005	Mount Lemmon	Mount Lemmon Survey	·	680 m	MPC · JPL
623981	2000 TB_{81}	—	September 14, 2013	Mount Lemmon	Mount Lemmon Survey	L5	6.7 km	MPC · JPL
623982	2000 TP_{81}	—	October 6, 2000	Kitt Peak	Spacewatch	·	1.6 km	MPC · JPL
623983	2000 UE	—	October 19, 2000	Ondřejov	L. Kotková	H	570 m	MPC · JPL
623984	2000 UB_{114}	—	November 27, 2000	Socorro	LINEAR	·	570 m	MPC · JPL
623985	2000 UU_{115}	—	June 23, 2015	Haleakala	Pan-STARRS 1	NYS	950 m	MPC · JPL
623986	2000 VK_{60}	—	November 1, 2000	Socorro	LINEAR	·	790 m	MPC · JPL
623987	2000 VS_{65}	—	February 23, 2012	Mount Lemmon	Mount Lemmon Survey	·	1.7 km	MPC · JPL
623988	2000 WG_{150}	—	September 24, 2000	Kitt Peak	Spacewatch	·	1.2 km	MPC · JPL
623989	2000 WN_{202}	—	July 23, 2015	Haleakala	Pan-STARRS 1	·	870 m	MPC · JPL
623990	2000 XZ_{55}	—	October 21, 2003	Kitt Peak	Spacewatch	·	600 m	MPC · JPL
623991	2000 XA_{56}	—	November 19, 2008	Catalina	CSS	T_{j} (2.97) · 3:2	4.7 km	MPC · JPL
623992	2000 YS_{145}	—	January 4, 2016	Haleakala	Pan-STARRS 1	·	1.6 km	MPC · JPL
623993	2001 AP_{19}	—	January 4, 2001	Bohyunsan	Bohyunsan	·	550 m	MPC · JPL
623994	2001 CX_{50}	—	March 30, 2015	Haleakala	Pan-STARRS 1	·	570 m	MPC · JPL
623995	2001 DC_{83}	—	February 22, 2001	Kitt Peak	Spacewatch	·	990 m	MPC · JPL
623996	2001 DB_{113}	—	September 29, 2009	Mount Lemmon	Mount Lemmon Survey	·	2.2 km	MPC · JPL
623997	2001 DK_{113}	—	March 15, 2012	Haleakala	Pan-STARRS 1	·	1.1 km	MPC · JPL
623998	2001 DT_{114}	—	January 13, 2011	Kitt Peak	Spacewatch	·	450 m	MPC · JPL
623999	2001 DU_{115}	—	March 10, 2016	Mount Lemmon	Mount Lemmon Survey	·	770 m	MPC · JPL
624000	2001 DZ_{118}	—	October 14, 2013	Kitt Peak	Spacewatch	·	610 m	MPC · JPL

back to top

== Meaning of names ==
As minor planet discoveries are confirmed, they are given a permanent number by the IAU's Minor Planet Center (MPC), and the discoverers can then submit names for them, following the IAU's naming conventions. The list below concerns those minor planets in the specified number-range that have received names, and explains the meanings of those names.

Official naming citations of newly named small Solar System bodies are approved and published in a bulletin by IAU's Working Group for Small Bodies Nomenclature (WGSBN). Before May 2021, citations were published in MPC's Minor Planet Circulars for many decades. Recent citations can also be found on the JPL Small-Body Database (SBDB). Until his death in 2016, German astronomer Lutz D. Schmadel compiled these citations into the Dictionary of Minor Planet Names (DMP) and regularly updated the collection.

Based on Paul Herget's The Names of the Minor Planets, Schmadel also researched the unclear origin of numerous asteroids, most of which had been named prior to World War II. This article incorporates text from this source, which is in the public domain: SBDB New namings may only be added to this list below after official publication as the preannouncement of names is condemned. The WGSBN publishes a comprehensive guideline for the naming rules of non-cometary small Solar System bodies.

Named minor planet	Provisional	This minor planet was named for...	Ref · Catalog
623031 Cartaya	2015 GP_{61}	Pedro Pablo Cartaya Gonzalez-Llorente, SJ, (b. 1936), a Cuban-American astronomer.	IAU · 623031
623826 Alekseyvarkin	2022 WY_{16}	Aleksey Makarovich Varkin (1923–1986), a World War II veteran from Sabanovo (near Penza, Russia). He was awarded after being wounded rescuing horses during the war. He is a great-grandfather of the discoverer.	IAU · 623826
623827 Nikandrilyich	2022 WY_{17}	Nikandr Ilyich Romanov (1916–1999), a World War II veteran, foreman, and beekeeper from Kozhikovo (near Cheboksary, Russia). He is a great-grandfather of the discoverer.	IAU · 623827
