= List of minor planets: 635001–636000 =

The following is a partial list of minor planets, running from minor-planet number 635001 through 636000, inclusive. The primary data for this and other partial lists is based on JPL's "Small-Body Orbital Elements" and data available from the Minor Planet Center. Critical list information is also provided by the MPC, unless otherwise specified from Lowell Observatory. A detailed description of the table's columns and additional sources are given on the main page including a complete list of every page in this series, and a statistical break-up on the dynamical classification of minor planets.

Also see the summary list of all named bodies in numerical and alphabetical order, and the corresponding naming citations for the number range of this particular list. New namings may only be added to this list after official publication, as the preannouncement of names is condemned by the Working Group for Small Bodies Nomenclature of the International Astronomical Union.

| Near-Earth obj. | MBA (inner) | MBA (outer) | Centaur |
| Mars-crosser | MBA (middle) | Jupiter trojan | Trans-Neptunian obj. |
| Unclassified |

== 635001–635100 ==
| Designation | | | Discovery | | | Properties | | Ref |
| Permanent | Provisional | Named after | Date | Site | Discoverer(s) | Category | Diam. | Ref |
|---|---|---|---|---|---|---|---|---|
| 635001 | 2012 UZ_{103} | — | October 15, 2012 | Kitt Peak | Spacewatch | · | 2.1 km | MPC · JPL |
| 635002 | 2012 UG_{104} | — | December 3, 2005 | Mauna Kea | A. Boattini | (5) | 1.3 km | MPC · JPL |
| 635003 | 2012 UK_{104} | — | January 24, 2003 | La Silla | A. Boattini, Hainaut, O. | · | 3.4 km | MPC · JPL |
| 635004 | 2012 UT_{105} | — | December 18, 2007 | Kitt Peak | Spacewatch | · | 2.1 km | MPC · JPL |
| 635005 | 2012 UN_{107} | — | October 8, 2012 | Mount Lemmon | Mount Lemmon Survey | (8737) | 2.8 km | MPC · JPL |
| 635006 | 2012 UU_{108} | — | October 20, 2008 | Mount Lemmon | Mount Lemmon Survey | · | 1.4 km | MPC · JPL |
| 635007 | 2012 UG_{110} | — | July 28, 2003 | Reedy Creek | J. Broughton | · | 1.9 km | MPC · JPL |
| 635008 | 2012 UG_{119} | — | October 22, 2012 | Mount Lemmon | Mount Lemmon Survey | · | 2.5 km | MPC · JPL |
| 635009 | 2012 UA_{121} | — | January 31, 2009 | Mount Lemmon | Mount Lemmon Survey | · | 2.2 km | MPC · JPL |
| 635010 | 2012 UB_{125} | — | September 23, 2008 | Kitt Peak | Spacewatch | · | 1.0 km | MPC · JPL |
| 635011 | 2012 UY_{125} | — | November 2, 2007 | Mount Lemmon | Mount Lemmon Survey | AGN | 1.2 km | MPC · JPL |
| 635012 | 2012 UE_{135} | — | May 25, 2011 | Nogales | M. Schwartz, P. R. Holvorcem | · | 1.9 km | MPC · JPL |
| 635013 | 2012 UC_{143} | — | April 11, 2003 | Kitt Peak | Spacewatch | · | 1.4 km | MPC · JPL |
| 635014 | 2012 UE_{144} | — | December 24, 2005 | Kitt Peak | Spacewatch | · | 1.1 km | MPC · JPL |
| 635015 | 2012 UR_{145} | — | March 1, 2009 | Catalina | CSS | · | 2.7 km | MPC · JPL |
| 635016 | 2012 UY_{146} | — | November 12, 2007 | Mount Lemmon | Mount Lemmon Survey | EOS | 1.8 km | MPC · JPL |
| 635017 | 2012 UJ_{148} | — | October 8, 2012 | Haleakala | Pan-STARRS 1 | · | 4.6 km | MPC · JPL |
| 635018 | 2012 UU_{161} | — | October 22, 2012 | Kitt Peak | Spacewatch | · | 2.9 km | MPC · JPL |
| 635019 | 2012 UF_{163} | — | October 22, 2012 | Kitt Peak | Spacewatch | L4 | 10 km | MPC · JPL |
| 635020 | 2012 UU_{167} | — | February 27, 2003 | Haleakala | NEAT | · | 3.7 km | MPC · JPL |
| 635021 | 2012 UP_{171} | — | October 15, 2012 | Mount Lemmon | Mount Lemmon Survey | · | 1.0 km | MPC · JPL |
| 635022 | 2012 UF_{180} | — | December 5, 2007 | Kitt Peak | Spacewatch | EOS | 1.4 km | MPC · JPL |
| 635023 | 2012 UC_{185} | — | October 22, 2012 | Haleakala | Pan-STARRS 1 | · | 2.3 km | MPC · JPL |
| 635024 | 2012 UQ_{223} | — | October 22, 2012 | Haleakala | Pan-STARRS 1 | · | 2.7 km | MPC · JPL |
| 635025 | 2012 UZ_{226} | — | October 17, 2012 | Haleakala | Pan-STARRS 1 | · | 2.1 km | MPC · JPL |
| 635026 | 2012 UT_{227} | — | October 20, 2012 | Haleakala | Pan-STARRS 1 | · | 2.8 km | MPC · JPL |
| 635027 | 2012 UY_{229} | — | November 4, 2007 | Mount Lemmon | Mount Lemmon Survey | · | 2.7 km | MPC · JPL |
| 635028 | 2012 UN_{230} | — | October 18, 2012 | Haleakala | Pan-STARRS 1 | · | 2.3 km | MPC · JPL |
| 635029 | 2012 UZ_{230} | — | October 20, 2012 | Haleakala | Pan-STARRS 1 | · | 2.2 km | MPC · JPL |
| 635030 | 2012 UU_{244} | — | July 5, 2000 | Kitt Peak | Spacewatch | · | 3.0 km | MPC · JPL |
| 635031 | 2012 VV_{2} | — | November 2, 2012 | Haleakala | Pan-STARRS 1 | EOS | 1.6 km | MPC · JPL |
| 635032 | 2012 VM_{5} | — | February 25, 2007 | Mount Lemmon | Mount Lemmon Survey | · | 1.2 km | MPC · JPL |
| 635033 | 2012 VQ_{5} | — | September 17, 2012 | Mount Lemmon | Mount Lemmon Survey | L5 | 7.4 km | MPC · JPL |
| 635034 | 2012 VF_{9} | — | April 3, 2002 | Kitt Peak | Spacewatch | · | 1.7 km | MPC · JPL |
| 635035 | 2012 VL_{9} | — | November 6, 2008 | Mount Lemmon | Mount Lemmon Survey | · | 1.2 km | MPC · JPL |
| 635036 | 2012 VW_{9} | — | October 27, 2005 | Mount Lemmon | Mount Lemmon Survey | · | 880 m | MPC · JPL |
| 635037 | 2012 VD_{15} | — | April 22, 2002 | Kitt Peak | Spacewatch | · | 2.2 km | MPC · JPL |
| 635038 | 2012 VH_{15} | — | November 4, 2012 | Haleakala | Pan-STARRS 1 | · | 1.2 km | MPC · JPL |
| 635039 | 2012 VP_{15} | — | September 26, 2006 | Catalina | CSS | · | 2.9 km | MPC · JPL |
| 635040 | 2012 VT_{16} | — | October 16, 2003 | Kitt Peak | Spacewatch | · | 1.4 km | MPC · JPL |
| 635041 | 2012 VM_{19} | — | September 20, 2006 | Catalina | CSS | EOS | 1.6 km | MPC · JPL |
| 635042 | 2012 VG_{25} | — | January 20, 2009 | Kitt Peak | Spacewatch | · | 1.9 km | MPC · JPL |
| 635043 | 2012 VK_{33} | — | October 21, 2012 | Nogales | M. Schwartz, P. R. Holvorcem | EOS | 2.0 km | MPC · JPL |
| 635044 | 2012 VA_{39} | — | September 25, 2006 | Mount Lemmon | Mount Lemmon Survey | · | 2.4 km | MPC · JPL |
| 635045 | 2012 VQ_{39} | — | August 9, 2002 | Cerro Tololo | Deep Ecliptic Survey | · | 2.0 km | MPC · JPL |
| 635046 | 2012 VV_{41} | — | November 4, 2012 | Mount Lemmon | Mount Lemmon Survey | · | 1.8 km | MPC · JPL |
| 635047 | 2012 VN_{43} | — | February 5, 2005 | Bergisch Gladbach | W. Bickel | · | 1.8 km | MPC · JPL |
| 635048 | 2012 VV_{43} | — | November 7, 2012 | Haleakala | Pan-STARRS 1 | · | 1.9 km | MPC · JPL |
| 635049 | 2012 VD_{49} | — | October 20, 2012 | Kitt Peak | Spacewatch | EOS | 1.5 km | MPC · JPL |
| 635050 | 2012 VA_{57} | — | October 21, 2012 | Haleakala | Pan-STARRS 1 | · | 1.7 km | MPC · JPL |
| 635051 | 2012 VC_{57} | — | October 21, 2012 | Haleakala | Pan-STARRS 1 | · | 1.4 km | MPC · JPL |
| 635052 | 2012 VM_{62} | — | December 4, 2007 | Mount Lemmon | Mount Lemmon Survey | · | 2.1 km | MPC · JPL |
| 635053 | 2012 VQ_{62} | — | October 11, 2001 | Palomar | NEAT | · | 3.0 km | MPC · JPL |
| 635054 | 2012 VH_{70} | — | September 20, 2003 | Socorro | LINEAR | EUN | 1.4 km | MPC · JPL |
| 635055 | 2012 VC_{79} | — | September 28, 2006 | Catalina | CSS | EUP | 3.9 km | MPC · JPL |
| 635056 | 2012 VR_{96} | — | May 4, 2002 | Kitt Peak | Spacewatch | (5) · fast | 1.4 km | MPC · JPL |
| 635057 Bangailona | 2012 VW_{97} | Bangailona | October 21, 2012 | Piszkéstető | K. Sárneczky, G. Hodosán | T_{j} (2.99) | 3.2 km | MPC · JPL |
| 635058 | 2012 VW_{99} | — | October 10, 2012 | Nogales | M. Schwartz, P. R. Holvorcem | · | 4.0 km | MPC · JPL |
| 635059 | 2012 VW_{116} | — | June 8, 2016 | Haleakala | Pan-STARRS 1 | TIR | 3.0 km | MPC · JPL |
| 635060 | 2012 VG_{124} | — | January 31, 2017 | Haleakala | Pan-STARRS 1 | L5 | 7.4 km | MPC · JPL |
| 635061 | 2012 VL_{128} | — | November 13, 2012 | Kitt Peak | Spacewatch | VER | 2.5 km | MPC · JPL |
| 635062 | 2012 VD_{133} | — | November 4, 2012 | Haleakala | Pan-STARRS 1 | · | 1.8 km | MPC · JPL |
| 635063 | 2012 WC_{2} | — | November 17, 2012 | Mount Lemmon | Mount Lemmon Survey | · | 1.9 km | MPC · JPL |
| 635064 | 2012 WL_{2} | — | November 7, 2012 | Haleakala | Pan-STARRS 1 | · | 1.2 km | MPC · JPL |
| 635065 | 2012 WW_{4} | — | September 17, 2003 | Kitt Peak | Spacewatch | · | 1.6 km | MPC · JPL |
| 635066 | 2012 WQ_{9} | — | October 23, 2006 | Palomar | NEAT | · | 3.2 km | MPC · JPL |
| 635067 | 2012 WU_{15} | — | September 17, 2006 | Kitt Peak | Spacewatch | · | 2.4 km | MPC · JPL |
| 635068 | 2012 WB_{23} | — | September 29, 2008 | Mount Lemmon | Mount Lemmon Survey | · | 1.4 km | MPC · JPL |
| 635069 | 2012 WC_{27} | — | November 22, 2012 | Nogales | M. Schwartz, P. R. Holvorcem | · | 3.7 km | MPC · JPL |
| 635070 | 2012 WJ_{29} | — | October 11, 2006 | Palomar | NEAT | LIX | 3.5 km | MPC · JPL |
| 635071 | 2012 WK_{29} | — | September 19, 2011 | Mount Lemmon | Mount Lemmon Survey | · | 2.6 km | MPC · JPL |
| 635072 | 2012 WJ_{31} | — | November 17, 2012 | Mount Lemmon | Mount Lemmon Survey | THM | 1.9 km | MPC · JPL |
| 635073 | 2012 WP_{33} | — | November 26, 2012 | Mount Lemmon | Mount Lemmon Survey | · | 2.6 km | MPC · JPL |
| 635074 | 2012 WR_{34} | — | December 24, 2000 | Bohyunsan | Bohyunsan | · | 1.5 km | MPC · JPL |
| 635075 | 2012 WL_{36} | — | January 17, 2008 | Mount Lemmon | Mount Lemmon Survey | · | 2.9 km | MPC · JPL |
| 635076 | 2012 WU_{42} | — | November 22, 2012 | Kitt Peak | Spacewatch | · | 820 m | MPC · JPL |
| 635077 | 2012 WD_{43} | — | November 24, 2012 | Kitt Peak | Spacewatch | · | 2.6 km | MPC · JPL |
| 635078 | 2012 XL_{17} | — | September 16, 2003 | Kitt Peak | Spacewatch | · | 1.5 km | MPC · JPL |
| 635079 | 2012 XM_{18} | — | April 21, 2009 | Kitt Peak | Spacewatch | · | 3.1 km | MPC · JPL |
| 635080 | 2012 XF_{19} | — | November 15, 2003 | Kitt Peak | Spacewatch | · | 1.4 km | MPC · JPL |
| 635081 | 2012 XK_{20} | — | November 7, 2007 | Kitt Peak | Spacewatch | · | 1.9 km | MPC · JPL |
| 635082 | 2012 XV_{22} | — | August 25, 2011 | Piszkés-tető | K. Sárneczky, S. Kürti | · | 3.2 km | MPC · JPL |
| 635083 | 2012 XC_{30} | — | October 18, 2003 | Apache Point | SDSS Collaboration | · | 1.4 km | MPC · JPL |
| 635084 | 2012 XR_{34} | — | August 31, 2011 | Haleakala | Pan-STARRS 1 | EOS | 2.0 km | MPC · JPL |
| 635085 | 2012 XH_{40} | — | October 31, 2008 | Kitt Peak | Spacewatch | · | 1.6 km | MPC · JPL |
| 635086 | 2012 XN_{42} | — | December 18, 2007 | Mount Lemmon | Mount Lemmon Survey | · | 2.6 km | MPC · JPL |
| 635087 | 2012 XX_{42} | — | September 29, 2008 | Kitt Peak | Spacewatch | CLA | 1.4 km | MPC · JPL |
| 635088 | 2012 XO_{44} | — | December 3, 2012 | Mount Lemmon | Mount Lemmon Survey | EOS | 1.8 km | MPC · JPL |
| 635089 | 2012 XE_{48} | — | December 4, 2007 | Mount Lemmon | Mount Lemmon Survey | · | 2.9 km | MPC · JPL |
| 635090 | 2012 XZ_{51} | — | September 25, 2006 | Anderson Mesa | LONEOS | · | 3.3 km | MPC · JPL |
| 635091 | 2012 XE_{64} | — | March 5, 2002 | Apache Point | SDSS Collaboration | · | 1.4 km | MPC · JPL |
| 635092 | 2012 XP_{71} | — | December 30, 2007 | Mount Lemmon | Mount Lemmon Survey | · | 2.3 km | MPC · JPL |
| 635093 | 2012 XA_{80} | — | December 6, 2012 | Mount Lemmon | Mount Lemmon Survey | · | 3.2 km | MPC · JPL |
| 635094 | 2012 XF_{93} | — | November 15, 2012 | Oukaïmeden | C. Rinner | · | 3.4 km | MPC · JPL |
| 635095 | 2012 XK_{95} | — | February 2, 2005 | Catalina | CSS | · | 2.1 km | MPC · JPL |
| 635096 | 2012 XH_{96} | — | April 21, 2009 | Mount Lemmon | Mount Lemmon Survey | · | 2.2 km | MPC · JPL |
| 635097 | 2012 XQ_{97} | — | March 10, 2005 | Mount Lemmon | Mount Lemmon Survey | · | 2.1 km | MPC · JPL |
| 635098 | 2012 XH_{101} | — | December 5, 2012 | Mount Lemmon | Mount Lemmon Survey | · | 2.2 km | MPC · JPL |
| 635099 | 2012 XD_{107} | — | November 18, 2007 | Mount Lemmon | Mount Lemmon Survey | · | 2.5 km | MPC · JPL |
| 635100 | 2012 XM_{110} | — | November 12, 2012 | Mount Lemmon | Mount Lemmon Survey | · | 2.3 km | MPC · JPL |

== 635101–635200 ==
back to top

| Designation | | | Discovery | | | Properties | | Ref |
| Permanent | Provisional | Named after | Date | Site | Discoverer(s) | Category | Diam. | Ref |
|---|---|---|---|---|---|---|---|---|
| 635101 | 2012 XG_{111} | — | September 15, 2009 | Catalina | CSS | H | 480 m | MPC · JPL |
| 635102 | 2012 XV_{111} | — | October 31, 2005 | Mauna Kea | A. Boattini | L5 | 10 km | MPC · JPL |
| 635103 | 2012 XQ_{112} | — | November 8, 2007 | Mount Lemmon | Mount Lemmon Survey | · | 3.2 km | MPC · JPL |
| 635104 | 2012 XU_{113} | — | June 26, 2011 | Mount Lemmon | Mount Lemmon Survey | · | 2.5 km | MPC · JPL |
| 635105 | 2012 XL_{114} | — | December 4, 2008 | Mount Lemmon | Mount Lemmon Survey | · | 1.7 km | MPC · JPL |
| 635106 | 2012 XO_{117} | — | December 8, 2012 | Nogales | M. Schwartz, P. R. Holvorcem | · | 1.1 km | MPC · JPL |
| 635107 | 2012 XW_{117} | — | September 18, 2011 | La Sagra | OAM | · | 3.8 km | MPC · JPL |
| 635108 | 2012 XD_{121} | — | November 26, 2008 | La Sagra | OAM | · | 2.0 km | MPC · JPL |
| 635109 | 2012 XB_{122} | — | September 25, 2006 | Mount Lemmon | Mount Lemmon Survey | · | 2.0 km | MPC · JPL |
| 635110 | 2012 XV_{133} | — | July 8, 2003 | Palomar | NEAT | (5) | 1.8 km | MPC · JPL |
| 635111 | 2012 XR_{137} | — | September 20, 2003 | Palomar | NEAT | · | 2.4 km | MPC · JPL |
| 635112 | 2012 XN_{138} | — | December 9, 2001 | Kitt Peak | Spacewatch | TIR | 2.7 km | MPC · JPL |
| 635113 | 2012 XU_{138} | — | December 4, 2012 | Mount Lemmon | Mount Lemmon Survey | · | 3.5 km | MPC · JPL |
| 635114 | 2012 XC_{143} | — | October 21, 2006 | Mount Lemmon | Mount Lemmon Survey | · | 2.7 km | MPC · JPL |
| 635115 | 2012 XK_{144} | — | April 9, 2010 | Mount Lemmon | Mount Lemmon Survey | · | 1.3 km | MPC · JPL |
| 635116 | 2012 XA_{146} | — | December 4, 2007 | Mount Lemmon | Mount Lemmon Survey | · | 3.4 km | MPC · JPL |
| 635117 | 2012 XS_{150} | — | December 4, 2007 | Mount Lemmon | Mount Lemmon Survey | EOS | 1.7 km | MPC · JPL |
| 635118 | 2012 XM_{153} | — | September 28, 2006 | Kitt Peak | Spacewatch | · | 2.7 km | MPC · JPL |
| 635119 | 2012 XM_{154} | — | November 16, 2012 | Kislovodsk | V. Nevski, V. Linkov | · | 1.6 km | MPC · JPL |
| 635120 | 2012 XP_{156} | — | May 25, 2006 | Mauna Kea | P. A. Wiegert | EUN | 1.5 km | MPC · JPL |
| 635121 | 2012 XM_{158} | — | December 12, 2012 | Mount Lemmon | Mount Lemmon Survey | · | 1.5 km | MPC · JPL |
| 635122 | 2012 XK_{159} | — | December 4, 2012 | Mount Lemmon | Mount Lemmon Survey | · | 2.4 km | MPC · JPL |
| 635123 | 2012 XO_{169} | — | March 31, 2003 | Apache Point | SDSS Collaboration | · | 3.3 km | MPC · JPL |
| 635124 | 2012 XA_{179} | — | December 2, 2012 | Mount Lemmon | Mount Lemmon Survey | · | 1.2 km | MPC · JPL |
| 635125 | 2012 YU_{4} | — | January 30, 2003 | Kitt Peak | Spacewatch | · | 2.5 km | MPC · JPL |
| 635126 | 2012 YO_{19} | — | December 21, 2012 | Mount Lemmon | Mount Lemmon Survey | · | 2.8 km | MPC · JPL |
| 635127 | 2013 AA | — | July 9, 2003 | Kitt Peak | Spacewatch | H | 590 m | MPC · JPL |
| 635128 | 2013 AK_{1} | — | January 8, 2005 | Campo Imperatore | CINEOS | · | 1.7 km | MPC · JPL |
| 635129 | 2013 AJ_{7} | — | January 3, 2013 | Mount Lemmon | Mount Lemmon Survey | · | 3.1 km | MPC · JPL |
| 635130 | 2013 AP_{7} | — | December 13, 2006 | Catalina | CSS | LIX | 3.5 km | MPC · JPL |
| 635131 | 2013 AX_{14} | — | March 2, 2009 | Mount Lemmon | Mount Lemmon Survey | EOS | 2.0 km | MPC · JPL |
| 635132 | 2013 AF_{17} | — | March 10, 2005 | Mount Lemmon | Mount Lemmon Survey | · | 1.6 km | MPC · JPL |
| 635133 | 2013 AM_{17} | — | September 24, 2011 | Haleakala | Pan-STARRS 1 | · | 2.6 km | MPC · JPL |
| 635134 | 2013 AH_{21} | — | October 23, 2003 | Apache Point | SDSS | · | 1.6 km | MPC · JPL |
| 635135 | 2013 AV_{22} | — | August 20, 2000 | Kitt Peak | Spacewatch | · | 1.2 km | MPC · JPL |
| 635136 | 2013 AT_{25} | — | September 30, 2005 | Mauna Kea | A. Boattini | · | 1.6 km | MPC · JPL |
| 635137 | 2013 AU_{28} | — | January 18, 2005 | Catalina | CSS | · | 1.3 km | MPC · JPL |
| 635138 | 2013 AR_{29} | — | October 11, 1999 | Kitt Peak | Spacewatch | VER | 2.9 km | MPC · JPL |
| 635139 | 2013 AW_{30} | — | January 13, 2008 | Kitt Peak | Spacewatch | · | 2.9 km | MPC · JPL |
| 635140 | 2013 AY_{30} | — | January 3, 2013 | Mount Lemmon | Mount Lemmon Survey | · | 2.9 km | MPC · JPL |
| 635141 | 2013 AB_{38} | — | May 10, 2005 | Cerro Tololo | Deep Ecliptic Survey | · | 1.8 km | MPC · JPL |
| 635142 | 2013 AM_{52} | — | January 9, 2013 | Catalina | CSS | · | 2.6 km | MPC · JPL |
| 635143 | 2013 AX_{53} | — | February 13, 2002 | Apache Point | SDSS Collaboration | L4 | 10 km | MPC · JPL |
| 635144 | 2013 AU_{56} | — | October 5, 2002 | Palomar | NEAT | · | 2.9 km | MPC · JPL |
| 635145 | 2013 AT_{58} | — | February 6, 2002 | Palomar | NEAT | · | 3.1 km | MPC · JPL |
| 635146 | 2013 AG_{61} | — | October 3, 2006 | Mount Lemmon | Mount Lemmon Survey | · | 2.9 km | MPC · JPL |
| 635147 | 2013 AP_{65} | — | June 9, 2011 | Mount Lemmon | Mount Lemmon Survey | · | 3.1 km | MPC · JPL |
| 635148 | 2013 AP_{66} | — | October 10, 2007 | Mount Lemmon | Mount Lemmon Survey | · | 1.4 km | MPC · JPL |
| 635149 | 2013 AW_{67} | — | October 22, 2003 | Apache Point | SDSS | · | 1.4 km | MPC · JPL |
| 635150 | 2013 AW_{69} | — | March 26, 2003 | Kitt Peak | Spacewatch | · | 3.4 km | MPC · JPL |
| 635151 | 2013 AV_{75} | — | January 12, 2013 | Bergisch Gladbach | W. Bickel | L4 | 9.9 km | MPC · JPL |
| 635152 | 2013 AH_{80} | — | August 19, 2001 | Cerro Tololo | Deep Ecliptic Survey | · | 1.9 km | MPC · JPL |
| 635153 | 2013 AE_{81} | — | November 2, 2011 | Mount Lemmon | Mount Lemmon Survey | · | 3.6 km | MPC · JPL |
| 635154 | 2013 AJ_{95} | — | January 30, 2004 | Kitt Peak | Spacewatch | · | 2.1 km | MPC · JPL |
| 635155 | 2013 AQ_{95} | — | January 4, 2013 | Kitt Peak | Spacewatch | L4 | 10 km | MPC · JPL |
| 635156 | 2013 AZ_{97} | — | December 10, 2012 | Calar Alto-CASADO | Mottola, S. | · | 910 m | MPC · JPL |
| 635157 | 2013 AG_{98} | — | August 23, 2001 | Kitt Peak | Spacewatch | KOR | 1.5 km | MPC · JPL |
| 635158 | 2013 AP_{98} | — | January 3, 2013 | Haleakala | Pan-STARRS 1 | · | 1.3 km | MPC · JPL |
| 635159 | 2013 AB_{99} | — | December 10, 2006 | Kitt Peak | Spacewatch | · | 3.0 km | MPC · JPL |
| 635160 | 2013 AO_{101} | — | December 30, 2008 | Mount Lemmon | Mount Lemmon Survey | · | 1.5 km | MPC · JPL |
| 635161 | 2013 AJ_{104} | — | November 3, 2007 | Mount Lemmon | Mount Lemmon Survey | L4 | 10 km | MPC · JPL |
| 635162 | 2013 AV_{111} | — | January 13, 2013 | ESA OGS | ESA OGS | L4 | 6.9 km | MPC · JPL |
| 635163 | 2013 AP_{113} | — | January 13, 2013 | Mount Lemmon | Mount Lemmon Survey | · | 1.5 km | MPC · JPL |
| 635164 | 2013 AJ_{114} | — | September 25, 2011 | Haleakala | Pan-STARRS 1 | · | 2.8 km | MPC · JPL |
| 635165 | 2013 AX_{116} | — | January 5, 2013 | Kitt Peak | Spacewatch | L4 | 8.1 km | MPC · JPL |
| 635166 | 2013 AK_{124} | — | January 14, 2013 | ESA OGS | ESA OGS | HYG | 2.7 km | MPC · JPL |
| 635167 | 2013 AM_{127} | — | October 3, 2002 | Palomar | NEAT | · | 2.5 km | MPC · JPL |
| 635168 | 2013 AM_{136} | — | January 10, 2013 | Haleakala | Pan-STARRS 1 | · | 1.2 km | MPC · JPL |
| 635169 | 2013 AZ_{141} | — | September 19, 2003 | Kitt Peak | Spacewatch | · | 1.2 km | MPC · JPL |
| 635170 | 2013 AA_{142} | — | January 4, 2013 | Cerro Tololo | DECam | EUN | 990 m | MPC · JPL |
| 635171 | 2013 AA_{143} | — | April 3, 2005 | Palomar | NEAT | · | 1.3 km | MPC · JPL |
| 635172 | 2013 AL_{148} | — | January 4, 2013 | Cerro Tololo-DECam | DECam | · | 1.4 km | MPC · JPL |
| 635173 | 2013 AN_{154} | — | January 20, 2013 | Mount Lemmon | Mount Lemmon Survey | · | 960 m | MPC · JPL |
| 635174 | 2013 AQ_{156} | — | January 4, 2013 | Cerro Tololo-DECam | DECam | L4 | 7.2 km | MPC · JPL |
| 635175 | 2013 AP_{161} | — | January 20, 2013 | Mount Lemmon | Mount Lemmon Survey | MAR | 1.0 km | MPC · JPL |
| 635176 | 2013 AM_{166} | — | September 18, 2009 | Kitt Peak | Spacewatch | L4 | 6.1 km | MPC · JPL |
| 635177 | 2013 AF_{167} | — | January 20, 2013 | Mount Lemmon | Mount Lemmon Survey | · | 2.1 km | MPC · JPL |
| 635178 | 2013 AN_{187} | — | January 10, 2013 | Haleakala | Pan-STARRS 1 | MAR | 930 m | MPC · JPL |
| 635179 | 2013 AS_{188} | — | January 3, 2013 | Haleakala | Pan-STARRS 1 | MAR | 1.0 km | MPC · JPL |
| 635180 | 2013 AU_{194} | — | January 5, 2013 | Mount Lemmon | Mount Lemmon Survey | · | 1.3 km | MPC · JPL |
| 635181 | 2013 AR_{196} | — | January 5, 2013 | Mount Lemmon | Mount Lemmon Survey | · | 1.1 km | MPC · JPL |
| 635182 | 2013 AR_{202} | — | January 10, 2013 | Haleakala | Pan-STARRS 1 | · | 3.0 km | MPC · JPL |
| 635183 | 2013 AZ_{202} | — | January 10, 2013 | Haleakala | Pan-STARRS 1 | · | 1.1 km | MPC · JPL |
| 635184 | 2013 AR_{208} | — | March 8, 2005 | Mount Lemmon | Mount Lemmon Survey | · | 930 m | MPC · JPL |
| 635185 | 2013 BT | — | May 30, 2006 | Mount Lemmon | Mount Lemmon Survey | L4 | 10 km | MPC · JPL |
| 635186 | 2013 BE_{1} | — | December 23, 2012 | Haleakala | Pan-STARRS 1 | L4 | 7.4 km | MPC · JPL |
| 635187 | 2013 BP_{1} | — | December 16, 2011 | Haleakala | Pan-STARRS 1 | L4 | 9.9 km | MPC · JPL |
| 635188 | 2013 BH_{2} | — | January 16, 2013 | Haleakala | Pan-STARRS 1 | L4 | 6.4 km | MPC · JPL |
| 635189 | 2013 BP_{3} | — | September 20, 2011 | Kitt Peak | Spacewatch | (1298) | 2.9 km | MPC · JPL |
| 635190 | 2013 BQ_{5} | — | January 16, 2013 | Mount Lemmon | Mount Lemmon Survey | · | 1.2 km | MPC · JPL |
| 635191 | 2013 BJ_{11} | — | October 13, 2010 | Kitt Peak | Spacewatch | L4 · ERY | 7.3 km | MPC · JPL |
| 635192 | 2013 BP_{14} | — | September 30, 1997 | Haleakala | AMOS | L4 | 9.9 km | MPC · JPL |
| 635193 | 2013 BZ_{15} | — | April 6, 2002 | Cerro Tololo | Deep Ecliptic Survey | L4 | 6.2 km | MPC · JPL |
| 635194 | 2013 BT_{17} | — | November 12, 2012 | Mount Lemmon | Mount Lemmon Survey | L4 | 8.6 km | MPC · JPL |
| 635195 | 2013 BT_{27} | — | September 16, 2009 | Kitt Peak | Spacewatch | L4 | 8.5 km | MPC · JPL |
| 635196 | 2013 BS_{28} | — | November 17, 2006 | Mount Lemmon | Mount Lemmon Survey | VER | 2.5 km | MPC · JPL |
| 635197 | 2013 BR_{30} | — | October 21, 2011 | Mount Lemmon | Mount Lemmon Survey | · | 3.1 km | MPC · JPL |
| 635198 | 2013 BA_{43} | — | November 22, 2006 | Kitt Peak | Spacewatch | · | 2.5 km | MPC · JPL |
| 635199 | 2013 BX_{47} | — | February 29, 2004 | Kitt Peak | Spacewatch | AGN | 1.4 km | MPC · JPL |
| 635200 | 2013 BO_{53} | — | October 16, 2007 | Mount Lemmon | Mount Lemmon Survey | · | 900 m | MPC · JPL |

== 635201–635300 ==
back to top

| Designation | | | Discovery | | | Properties | | Ref |
| Permanent | Provisional | Named after | Date | Site | Discoverer(s) | Category | Diam. | Ref |
|---|---|---|---|---|---|---|---|---|
| 635201 | 2013 BR_{54} | — | May 8, 2005 | Kitt Peak | Spacewatch | · | 1.8 km | MPC · JPL |
| 635202 | 2013 BP_{60} | — | September 10, 2010 | Kitt Peak | Spacewatch | L4 | 8.6 km | MPC · JPL |
| 635203 | 2013 BH_{62} | — | February 20, 2002 | Kitt Peak | Spacewatch | LIX | 3.4 km | MPC · JPL |
| 635204 | 2013 BB_{69} | — | January 20, 2013 | Kitt Peak | Spacewatch | L4 | 6.0 km | MPC · JPL |
| 635205 | 2013 BD_{73} | — | January 16, 2013 | Mount Lemmon | Mount Lemmon Survey | L4 | 7.0 km | MPC · JPL |
| 635206 | 2013 BU_{74} | — | January 27, 2007 | Kitt Peak | Spacewatch | · | 3.0 km | MPC · JPL |
| 635207 | 2013 BA_{81} | — | September 26, 2003 | Apache Point | SDSS | · | 1.4 km | MPC · JPL |
| 635208 | 2013 BW_{83} | — | January 17, 2013 | Haleakala | Pan-STARRS 1 | · | 1.6 km | MPC · JPL |
| 635209 | 2013 BW_{84} | — | January 21, 2013 | Haleakala | Pan-STARRS 1 | · | 1.7 km | MPC · JPL |
| 635210 | 2013 BD_{85} | — | January 17, 2009 | Kitt Peak | Spacewatch | · | 1.1 km | MPC · JPL |
| 635211 | 2013 BN_{94} | — | January 16, 2013 | Mount Lemmon | Mount Lemmon Survey | · | 2.9 km | MPC · JPL |
| 635212 | 2013 BE_{99} | — | January 20, 2013 | Kitt Peak | Spacewatch | L4 | 6.5 km | MPC · JPL |
| 635213 | 2013 BQ_{102} | — | January 19, 2013 | Kitt Peak | Spacewatch | L4 | 6.6 km | MPC · JPL |
| 635214 | 2013 CR_{9} | — | February 2, 2013 | Oukaïmeden | C. Rinner | · | 2.8 km | MPC · JPL |
| 635215 | 2013 CU_{9} | — | August 17, 2006 | Palomar | NEAT | · | 2.4 km | MPC · JPL |
| 635216 | 2013 CL_{10} | — | January 22, 2004 | Socorro | LINEAR | NEM | 2.1 km | MPC · JPL |
| 635217 | 2013 CU_{13} | — | March 1, 2009 | Kitt Peak | Spacewatch | · | 1.3 km | MPC · JPL |
| 635218 | 2013 CA_{15} | — | February 17, 2009 | Dauban | C. Rinner, Kugel, F. | KON | 2.5 km | MPC · JPL |
| 635219 | 2013 CU_{22} | — | October 24, 2011 | Mount Lemmon | Mount Lemmon Survey | · | 1.8 km | MPC · JPL |
| 635220 | 2013 CF_{23} | — | March 3, 2005 | Catalina | CSS | (5) | 1.2 km | MPC · JPL |
| 635221 | 2013 CV_{28} | — | September 7, 2008 | Mount Lemmon | Mount Lemmon Survey | L4 | 7.2 km | MPC · JPL |
| 635222 | 2013 CG_{29} | — | January 25, 2009 | Kitt Peak | Spacewatch | · | 950 m | MPC · JPL |
| 635223 | 2013 CO_{32} | — | February 26, 2004 | Kitt Peak | Deep Ecliptic Survey | · | 1.2 km | MPC · JPL |
| 635224 | 2013 CC_{41} | — | October 14, 2009 | Mount Lemmon | Mount Lemmon Survey | L4 | 7.0 km | MPC · JPL |
| 635225 | 2013 CF_{41} | — | March 8, 2005 | Mount Lemmon | Mount Lemmon Survey | · | 850 m | MPC · JPL |
| 635226 | 2013 CX_{41} | — | February 3, 2013 | Haleakala | Pan-STARRS 1 | · | 1.2 km | MPC · JPL |
| 635227 | 2013 CV_{49} | — | August 29, 2005 | Kitt Peak | Spacewatch | · | 2.6 km | MPC · JPL |
| 635228 | 2013 CC_{51} | — | October 2, 2011 | Piszkéstető | K. Sárneczky, Szalai, T. | · | 1.7 km | MPC · JPL |
| 635229 | 2013 CD_{52} | — | November 23, 2011 | Piszkéstető | K. Sárneczky, A. Pál | · | 2.3 km | MPC · JPL |
| 635230 | 2013 CE_{54} | — | October 1, 2011 | Mount Lemmon | Mount Lemmon Survey | LIX | 2.9 km | MPC · JPL |
| 635231 | 2013 CO_{54} | — | February 7, 2013 | Nogales | M. Schwartz, P. R. Holvorcem | · | 2.2 km | MPC · JPL |
| 635232 | 2013 CX_{63} | — | February 8, 2013 | Haleakala | Pan-STARRS 1 | L4 | 8.3 km | MPC · JPL |
| 635233 | 2013 CZ_{63} | — | April 5, 2005 | Palomar | NEAT | · | 1.7 km | MPC · JPL |
| 635234 | 2013 CU_{68} | — | February 8, 2013 | Nogales | M. Schwartz, P. R. Holvorcem | EUN | 1.0 km | MPC · JPL |
| 635235 | 2013 CR_{71} | — | October 1, 2011 | Kitt Peak | Spacewatch | · | 3.0 km | MPC · JPL |
| 635236 | 2013 CF_{72} | — | February 2, 2013 | Mount Lemmon | Mount Lemmon Survey | · | 2.2 km | MPC · JPL |
| 635237 | 2013 CN_{81} | — | November 2, 2011 | Kitt Peak | Spacewatch | · | 1.1 km | MPC · JPL |
| 635238 | 2013 CY_{97} | — | February 8, 2013 | Haleakala | Pan-STARRS 1 | MAR | 1.0 km | MPC · JPL |
| 635239 | 2013 CQ_{100} | — | February 8, 2013 | Haleakala | Pan-STARRS 1 | · | 1.1 km | MPC · JPL |
| 635240 | 2013 CK_{104} | — | January 20, 2013 | Kitt Peak | Spacewatch | L4 | 7.8 km | MPC · JPL |
| 635241 | 2013 CV_{104} | — | September 22, 2003 | Anderson Mesa | LONEOS | · | 990 m | MPC · JPL |
| 635242 | 2013 CC_{111} | — | September 28, 2009 | Kitt Peak | Spacewatch | L4 | 7.3 km | MPC · JPL |
| 635243 | 2013 CJ_{121} | — | September 25, 2011 | Haleakala | Pan-STARRS 1 | · | 1.1 km | MPC · JPL |
| 635244 | 2013 CE_{142} | — | January 18, 2008 | Pla D'Arguines | R. Ferrando, Ferrando, M. | · | 2.2 km | MPC · JPL |
| 635245 | 2013 CT_{142} | — | February 14, 2013 | ESA OGS | ESA OGS | · | 1.5 km | MPC · JPL |
| 635246 | 2013 CP_{150} | — | November 3, 2007 | Kitt Peak | Spacewatch | MAS | 840 m | MPC · JPL |
| 635247 | 2013 CQ_{163} | — | February 5, 2013 | Kitt Peak | Spacewatch | · | 1.0 km | MPC · JPL |
| 635248 | 2013 CU_{165} | — | January 13, 2002 | Palomar | NEAT | EOS | 1.6 km | MPC · JPL |
| 635249 | 2013 CN_{171} | — | January 10, 2008 | Kitt Peak | Spacewatch | · | 1.8 km | MPC · JPL |
| 635250 | 2013 CS_{184} | — | April 15, 2009 | Siding Spring | SSS | · | 1.1 km | MPC · JPL |
| 635251 | 2013 CZ_{185} | — | October 31, 2002 | Apache Point | SDSS | · | 1.7 km | MPC · JPL |
| 635252 | 2013 CO_{188} | — | January 12, 2002 | Palomar | NEAT | EOS | 2.6 km | MPC · JPL |
| 635253 | 2013 CQ_{190} | — | August 19, 2006 | La Cañada | Lacruz, J. | · | 1.7 km | MPC · JPL |
| 635254 | 2013 CR_{198} | — | December 2, 2011 | ESA OGS | ESA OGS | · | 2.4 km | MPC · JPL |
| 635255 | 2013 CF_{200} | — | October 27, 2009 | Mount Lemmon | Mount Lemmon Survey | L4 · ERY | 6.3 km | MPC · JPL |
| 635256 | 2013 CE_{201} | — | September 11, 2007 | Mount Lemmon | Mount Lemmon Survey | L4 | 8.0 km | MPC · JPL |
| 635257 | 2013 CJ_{202} | — | March 17, 2004 | Kitt Peak | Spacewatch | MRX | 930 m | MPC · JPL |
| 635258 | 2013 CO_{203} | — | October 15, 2007 | Mount Lemmon | Mount Lemmon Survey | · | 1.3 km | MPC · JPL |
| 635259 | 2013 CD_{205} | — | November 26, 1998 | Kitt Peak | Spacewatch | · | 2.9 km | MPC · JPL |
| 635260 | 2013 CA_{207} | — | November 3, 2011 | Mount Lemmon | Mount Lemmon Survey | · | 1.2 km | MPC · JPL |
| 635261 | 2013 CR_{210} | — | February 3, 2013 | Haleakala | Pan-STARRS 1 | URS | 2.6 km | MPC · JPL |
| 635262 | 2013 CT_{213} | — | October 14, 2007 | Mount Lemmon | Mount Lemmon Survey | · | 730 m | MPC · JPL |
| 635263 | 2013 CZ_{216} | — | November 1, 2011 | Kitt Peak | Spacewatch | · | 1.4 km | MPC · JPL |
| 635264 | 2013 CX_{218} | — | February 9, 2013 | Haleakala | Pan-STARRS 1 | · | 3.1 km | MPC · JPL |
| 635265 | 2013 CY_{218} | — | November 5, 2007 | Mount Lemmon | Mount Lemmon Survey | · | 1.3 km | MPC · JPL |
| 635266 | 2013 CD_{219} | — | September 21, 2009 | Kitt Peak | Spacewatch | L4 | 6.2 km | MPC · JPL |
| 635267 | 2013 CP_{223} | — | September 10, 2007 | Kitt Peak | Spacewatch | L4 | 8.2 km | MPC · JPL |
| 635268 | 2013 CG_{240} | — | February 9, 2013 | Haleakala | Pan-STARRS 1 | · | 1.1 km | MPC · JPL |
| 635269 | 2013 CL_{240} | — | February 6, 2013 | Kitt Peak | Spacewatch | EOS | 1.4 km | MPC · JPL |
| 635270 | 2013 CB_{249} | — | February 15, 2013 | Haleakala | Pan-STARRS 1 | L4 | 6.7 km | MPC · JPL |
| 635271 | 2013 CZ_{253} | — | February 6, 2013 | Kitt Peak | Spacewatch | SYL | 3.5 km | MPC · JPL |
| 635272 | 2013 DK | — | February 5, 2013 | Kitt Peak | Spacewatch | L4 | 7.1 km | MPC · JPL |
| 635273 | 2013 DV_{10} | — | October 24, 2011 | Haleakala | Pan-STARRS 1 | · | 3.3 km | MPC · JPL |
| 635274 | 2013 DD_{12} | — | January 10, 2007 | Kitt Peak | Spacewatch | · | 2.4 km | MPC · JPL |
| 635275 | 2013 DY_{17} | — | April 8, 2014 | Haleakala | Pan-STARRS 1 | · | 1.4 km | MPC · JPL |
| 635276 | 2013 DQ_{20} | — | February 16, 2013 | Mount Lemmon | Mount Lemmon Survey | · | 3.4 km | MPC · JPL |
| 635277 | 2013 EH_{2} | — | February 8, 2007 | Mount Lemmon | Mount Lemmon Survey | · | 3.3 km | MPC · JPL |
| 635278 | 2013 EH_{7} | — | February 17, 2013 | Kitt Peak | Spacewatch | · | 1.4 km | MPC · JPL |
| 635279 | 2013 EA_{9} | — | February 8, 2000 | Kitt Peak | Spacewatch | · | 1.5 km | MPC · JPL |
| 635280 | 2013 EA_{19} | — | May 14, 2009 | Kitt Peak | Spacewatch | ADE | 1.7 km | MPC · JPL |
| 635281 | 2013 EV_{21} | — | October 16, 2006 | Kitt Peak | Spacewatch | · | 1.5 km | MPC · JPL |
| 635282 | 2013 EH_{22} | — | September 19, 2001 | Kitt Peak | Spacewatch | · | 1.9 km | MPC · JPL |
| 635283 | 2013 EL_{33} | — | October 26, 2011 | Haleakala | Pan-STARRS 1 | · | 2.5 km | MPC · JPL |
| 635284 | 2013 ET_{33} | — | January 31, 2004 | Kitt Peak | Spacewatch | · | 2.3 km | MPC · JPL |
| 635285 | 2013 ES_{37} | — | January 10, 2003 | Kitt Peak | Spacewatch | AGN | 1.4 km | MPC · JPL |
| 635286 | 2013 ED_{64} | — | March 8, 2013 | Haleakala | Pan-STARRS 1 | · | 1.2 km | MPC · JPL |
| 635287 | 2013 EZ_{65} | — | April 1, 2005 | Kitt Peak | Spacewatch | · | 1.1 km | MPC · JPL |
| 635288 | 2013 ES_{82} | — | February 17, 2013 | Mount Lemmon | Mount Lemmon Survey | · | 820 m | MPC · JPL |
| 635289 | 2013 EX_{84} | — | April 1, 2003 | Apache Point | SDSS Collaboration | · | 2.2 km | MPC · JPL |
| 635290 | 2013 EM_{85} | — | March 8, 2013 | Haleakala | Pan-STARRS 1 | · | 1.5 km | MPC · JPL |
| 635291 | 2013 EA_{86} | — | October 18, 2011 | Haleakala | Pan-STARRS 1 | · | 1.7 km | MPC · JPL |
| 635292 | 2013 ER_{93} | — | September 12, 2010 | ESA OGS | ESA OGS | · | 3.8 km | MPC · JPL |
| 635293 | 2013 ET_{93} | — | May 9, 2000 | Socorro | LINEAR | · | 1.8 km | MPC · JPL |
| 635294 | 2013 EP_{99} | — | May 15, 2009 | Kitt Peak | Spacewatch | · | 1.5 km | MPC · JPL |
| 635295 | 2013 EV_{101} | — | March 11, 2013 | Kitt Peak | Spacewatch | HNS | 960 m | MPC · JPL |
| 635296 | 2013 EE_{108} | — | August 11, 2002 | Cerro Tololo | Deep Ecliptic Survey | · | 1.1 km | MPC · JPL |
| 635297 | 2013 EA_{113} | — | March 13, 2013 | Mount Lemmon | Mount Lemmon Survey | · | 1.5 km | MPC · JPL |
| 635298 | 2013 EV_{115} | — | March 12, 2013 | Kitt Peak | Spacewatch | · | 1.3 km | MPC · JPL |
| 635299 | 2013 EX_{115} | — | March 12, 2013 | Kitt Peak | Spacewatch | · | 1.2 km | MPC · JPL |
| 635300 | 2013 EP_{116} | — | August 10, 2010 | Kitt Peak | Spacewatch | · | 1.7 km | MPC · JPL |

== 635301–635400 ==
back to top

| Designation | | | Discovery | | | Properties | | Ref |
| Permanent | Provisional | Named after | Date | Site | Discoverer(s) | Category | Diam. | Ref |
|---|---|---|---|---|---|---|---|---|
| 635301 | 2013 ES_{133} | — | September 12, 2001 | Kitt Peak | Spacewatch | · | 1.3 km | MPC · JPL |
| 635302 | 2013 EM_{154} | — | January 26, 2000 | Kitt Peak | Spacewatch | L4 | 7.7 km | MPC · JPL |
| 635303 | 2013 EF_{159} | — | March 5, 2013 | Haleakala | Pan-STARRS 1 | EUN | 900 m | MPC · JPL |
| 635304 | 2013 EQ_{159} | — | February 21, 2013 | Haleakala | Pan-STARRS 1 | · | 3.3 km | MPC · JPL |
| 635305 | 2013 EN_{175} | — | March 14, 2013 | Kitt Peak | Spacewatch | · | 1.0 km | MPC · JPL |
| 635306 | 2013 EE_{182} | — | March 7, 2013 | Mount Lemmon | Mount Lemmon Survey | · | 3.0 km | MPC · JPL |
| 635307 | 2013 FH_{1} | — | October 22, 2006 | Mount Lemmon | Mount Lemmon Survey | KOR | 1.6 km | MPC · JPL |
| 635308 | 2013 FN_{1} | — | October 14, 2001 | Apache Point | SDSS | · | 2.0 km | MPC · JPL |
| 635309 | 2013 FB_{9} | — | December 7, 2007 | Cerro Burek | Burek, Cerro | EUN | 1.0 km | MPC · JPL |
| 635310 | 2013 FB_{12} | — | March 13, 2013 | Palomar | Palomar Transient Factory | · | 1.4 km | MPC · JPL |
| 635311 | 2013 FH_{16} | — | April 6, 2000 | Anderson Mesa | LONEOS | · | 1.4 km | MPC · JPL |
| 635312 | 2013 FT_{17} | — | March 4, 2003 | Cima Ekar | ADAS | · | 660 m | MPC · JPL |
| 635313 | 2013 FX_{34} | — | March 18, 2013 | Mount Lemmon | Mount Lemmon Survey | · | 3.4 km | MPC · JPL |
| 635314 | 2013 GS_{14} | — | March 12, 2013 | Mount Lemmon | Mount Lemmon Survey | · | 1.5 km | MPC · JPL |
| 635315 | 2013 GT_{16} | — | April 23, 2009 | Kitt Peak | Spacewatch | · | 1.4 km | MPC · JPL |
| 635316 | 2013 GA_{19} | — | September 30, 2006 | Mount Lemmon | Mount Lemmon Survey | · | 1.8 km | MPC · JPL |
| 635317 | 2013 GS_{20} | — | July 27, 2005 | Siding Spring | SSS | · | 1.8 km | MPC · JPL |
| 635318 | 2013 GM_{24} | — | April 2, 2013 | Kitt Peak | Spacewatch | · | 2.8 km | MPC · JPL |
| 635319 | 2013 GL_{28} | — | January 12, 1999 | Mauna Kea | Anderson, J., Veillet, C. | · | 1.5 km | MPC · JPL |
| 635320 | 2013 GK_{31} | — | August 30, 2005 | Kitt Peak | Spacewatch | KOR | 1.3 km | MPC · JPL |
| 635321 | 2013 GJ_{40} | — | March 11, 2008 | Kitt Peak | Spacewatch | KOR | 1.4 km | MPC · JPL |
| 635322 | 2013 GB_{42} | — | March 17, 2013 | Kitt Peak | Spacewatch | · | 1.4 km | MPC · JPL |
| 635323 | 2013 GE_{42} | — | October 8, 2010 | Kitt Peak | Spacewatch | · | 1.5 km | MPC · JPL |
| 635324 | 2013 GB_{52} | — | February 12, 2008 | Kitt Peak | Spacewatch | · | 1.7 km | MPC · JPL |
| 635325 | 2013 GN_{58} | — | January 31, 2006 | Kitt Peak | Spacewatch | · | 3.1 km | MPC · JPL |
| 635326 | 2013 GB_{60} | — | November 13, 2006 | Kitt Peak | Spacewatch | · | 2.9 km | MPC · JPL |
| 635327 | 2013 GS_{72} | — | January 11, 2008 | Kitt Peak | Spacewatch | · | 1.3 km | MPC · JPL |
| 635328 | 2013 GE_{73} | — | October 12, 2005 | Kitt Peak | Spacewatch | · | 2.0 km | MPC · JPL |
| 635329 | 2013 GH_{81} | — | October 6, 2001 | La Silla | Barbieri, C. | · | 1.7 km | MPC · JPL |
| 635330 | 2013 GA_{87} | — | February 2, 2008 | Kitt Peak | Spacewatch | · | 1.6 km | MPC · JPL |
| 635331 | 2013 GL_{88} | — | April 8, 2013 | Oukaïmeden | M. Ory | · | 1.8 km | MPC · JPL |
| 635332 | 2013 GY_{89} | — | September 6, 2007 | Siding Spring | K. Sárneczky, L. Kiss | · | 820 m | MPC · JPL |
| 635333 | 2013 GU_{94} | — | December 3, 2005 | Mauna Kea | A. Boattini | · | 750 m | MPC · JPL |
| 635334 | 2013 GR_{99} | — | April 6, 2013 | Haleakala | Pan-STARRS 1 | EUN | 1.0 km | MPC · JPL |
| 635335 | 2013 GJ_{102} | — | October 25, 2011 | Haleakala | Pan-STARRS 1 | · | 1.7 km | MPC · JPL |
| 635336 | 2013 GB_{105} | — | April 4, 2013 | Haleakala | Pan-STARRS 1 | · | 1.3 km | MPC · JPL |
| 635337 | 2013 GN_{105} | — | July 28, 2005 | Palomar | NEAT | · | 2.1 km | MPC · JPL |
| 635338 Pécsieszter | 2013 GF_{106} | Pécsieszter | January 15, 2002 | Piszkéstető | K. Sárneczky, Z. Heiner | · | 2.1 km | MPC · JPL |
| 635339 | 2013 GE_{110} | — | April 2, 2013 | Catalina | CSS | · | 1.5 km | MPC · JPL |
| 635340 | 2013 GC_{111} | — | February 6, 2007 | Kitt Peak | Spacewatch | · | 2.5 km | MPC · JPL |
| 635341 | 2013 GP_{116} | — | October 18, 2003 | Kitt Peak | Spacewatch | · | 1.2 km | MPC · JPL |
| 635342 | 2013 GK_{120} | — | April 7, 2013 | Mount Lemmon | Mount Lemmon Survey | · | 1.4 km | MPC · JPL |
| 635343 | 2013 GO_{126} | — | April 12, 2013 | Haleakala | Pan-STARRS 1 | RAF | 750 m | MPC · JPL |
| 635344 | 2013 GA_{134} | — | March 12, 2013 | Kitt Peak | Spacewatch | · | 1.0 km | MPC · JPL |
| 635345 | 2013 GB_{134} | — | May 21, 2004 | Kitt Peak | Spacewatch | · | 2.0 km | MPC · JPL |
| 635346 | 2013 GC_{134} | — | November 3, 2005 | Kitt Peak | Trilling, D. E. | · | 2.5 km | MPC · JPL |
| 635347 | 2013 GE_{151} | — | April 10, 2013 | Mount Lemmon | Mount Lemmon Survey | · | 1.2 km | MPC · JPL |
| 635348 | 2013 GE_{158} | — | April 14, 2013 | Mount Lemmon | Mount Lemmon Survey | · | 900 m | MPC · JPL |
| 635349 | 2013 GQ_{158} | — | April 10, 2013 | Haleakala | Pan-STARRS 1 | · | 3.2 km | MPC · JPL |
| 635350 | 2013 GV_{166} | — | April 13, 2013 | Haleakala | Pan-STARRS 1 | · | 580 m | MPC · JPL |
| 635351 | 2013 HR_{1} | — | August 27, 2005 | Palomar | NEAT | · | 1.9 km | MPC · JPL |
| 635352 | 2013 HF_{6} | — | April 18, 2013 | Mount Lemmon | Mount Lemmon Survey | · | 1.8 km | MPC · JPL |
| 635353 | 2013 HO_{10} | — | April 10, 2002 | Socorro | LINEAR | · | 3.7 km | MPC · JPL |
| 635354 | 2013 HG_{12} | — | January 27, 2012 | Mount Lemmon | Mount Lemmon Survey | · | 2.1 km | MPC · JPL |
| 635355 | 2013 HF_{13} | — | April 1, 2003 | Apache Point | SDSS | · | 2.5 km | MPC · JPL |
| 635356 | 2013 HA_{14} | — | October 10, 2001 | Palomar | NEAT | · | 2.2 km | MPC · JPL |
| 635357 | 2013 HR_{20} | — | April 30, 2013 | Palomar | Palomar Transient Factory | MAR | 1.3 km | MPC · JPL |
| 635358 | 2013 HY_{22} | — | March 14, 2004 | Palomar | NEAT | JUN | 1.3 km | MPC · JPL |
| 635359 | 2013 HO_{34} | — | November 14, 2006 | Mount Lemmon | Mount Lemmon Survey | · | 1.7 km | MPC · JPL |
| 635360 | 2013 HJ_{36} | — | August 23, 2001 | Kitt Peak | Spacewatch | · | 1.7 km | MPC · JPL |
| 635361 | 2013 HX_{46} | — | October 1, 2010 | Moletai | K. Černis | · | 2.0 km | MPC · JPL |
| 635362 | 2013 HV_{52} | — | April 16, 2013 | Cerro Tololo-DECam | DECam | · | 1.3 km | MPC · JPL |
| 635363 | 2013 HA_{77} | — | September 5, 2010 | Mount Lemmon | Mount Lemmon Survey | · | 1.6 km | MPC · JPL |
| 635364 | 2013 HB_{94} | — | August 25, 2000 | Cerro Tololo | Deep Ecliptic Survey | KOR | 1.3 km | MPC · JPL |
| 635365 | 2013 HG_{110} | — | November 12, 2006 | Mount Lemmon | Mount Lemmon Survey | · | 1.4 km | MPC · JPL |
| 635366 | 2013 HH_{110} | — | April 9, 2013 | Haleakala | Pan-STARRS 1 | · | 980 m | MPC · JPL |
| 635367 | 2013 HY_{122} | — | September 2, 2010 | Mount Lemmon | Mount Lemmon Survey | · | 1.1 km | MPC · JPL |
| 635368 | 2013 HV_{142} | — | February 4, 2009 | Mount Lemmon | Mount Lemmon Survey | NYS | 1.1 km | MPC · JPL |
| 635369 | 2013 HR_{147} | — | October 8, 2010 | Kitt Peak | Spacewatch | · | 1.3 km | MPC · JPL |
| 635370 | 2013 JC_{2} | — | April 20, 2013 | Mount Lemmon | Mount Lemmon Survey | · | 1.8 km | MPC · JPL |
| 635371 | 2013 JZ_{4} | — | April 8, 2013 | Palomar | Palomar Transient Factory | · | 1.6 km | MPC · JPL |
| 635372 | 2013 JB_{7} | — | March 15, 2005 | Mount Lemmon | Mount Lemmon Survey | EUN | 1.0 km | MPC · JPL |
| 635373 | 2013 JG_{19} | — | May 8, 2013 | Haleakala | Pan-STARRS 1 | · | 1.7 km | MPC · JPL |
| 635374 | 2013 JV_{19} | — | May 8, 2013 | Haleakala | Pan-STARRS 1 | · | 1.2 km | MPC · JPL |
| 635375 | 2013 JG_{26} | — | January 30, 2008 | Mount Lemmon | Mount Lemmon Survey | · | 1.0 km | MPC · JPL |
| 635376 | 2013 JS_{26} | — | April 16, 2013 | Haleakala | Pan-STARRS 1 | · | 1.3 km | MPC · JPL |
| 635377 | 2013 JL_{29} | — | November 30, 2011 | Kitt Peak | Spacewatch | · | 780 m | MPC · JPL |
| 635378 | 2013 JQ_{35} | — | March 4, 2000 | Kitt Peak | Spacewatch | · | 1.9 km | MPC · JPL |
| 635379 | 2013 JD_{42} | — | February 7, 2003 | Palomar | NEAT | · | 740 m | MPC · JPL |
| 635380 | 2013 JA_{45} | — | July 16, 2004 | Cerro Tololo | Deep Ecliptic Survey | · | 2.2 km | MPC · JPL |
| 635381 Michaelcoates | 2013 JH_{47} | Michaelcoates | April 11, 2013 | iTelescope | Falla, N. | HNS | 990 m | MPC · JPL |
| 635382 | 2013 JF_{51} | — | April 18, 2002 | Kitt Peak | Spacewatch | · | 3.2 km | MPC · JPL |
| 635383 | 2013 JM_{51} | — | April 15, 2013 | Haleakala | Pan-STARRS 1 | · | 1.5 km | MPC · JPL |
| 635384 | 2013 JX_{57} | — | May 8, 2013 | Haleakala | Pan-STARRS 1 | · | 1.7 km | MPC · JPL |
| 635385 | 2013 JC_{59} | — | December 1, 2005 | Kitt Peak | Wasserman, L. H., Millis, R. L. | · | 760 m | MPC · JPL |
| 635386 | 2013 JM_{61} | — | March 9, 2002 | Kitt Peak | Spacewatch | · | 2.2 km | MPC · JPL |
| 635387 | 2013 JA_{62} | — | October 1, 2005 | Mount Lemmon | Mount Lemmon Survey | · | 1.4 km | MPC · JPL |
| 635388 | 2013 JO_{67} | — | April 19, 2013 | Haleakala | Pan-STARRS 1 | · | 1.6 km | MPC · JPL |
| 635389 | 2013 JL_{74} | — | May 3, 2013 | Haleakala | Pan-STARRS 1 | · | 1.3 km | MPC · JPL |
| 635390 | 2013 JT_{74} | — | May 8, 2013 | Haleakala | Pan-STARRS 1 | · | 1.6 km | MPC · JPL |
| 635391 | 2013 KC_{4} | — | May 8, 2013 | Haleakala | Pan-STARRS 1 | · | 1.1 km | MPC · JPL |
| 635392 | 2013 KX_{4} | — | May 11, 2013 | Mount Lemmon | Mount Lemmon Survey | · | 590 m | MPC · JPL |
| 635393 | 2013 KE_{10} | — | November 14, 2010 | Mount Lemmon | Mount Lemmon Survey | · | 2.0 km | MPC · JPL |
| 635394 | 2013 LG_{6} | — | September 8, 2004 | St. Véran | St. Veran | · | 920 m | MPC · JPL |
| 635395 | 2013 LU_{18} | — | June 5, 2013 | Mount Lemmon | Mount Lemmon Survey | · | 1.3 km | MPC · JPL |
| 635396 | 2013 MY_{1} | — | August 19, 2003 | Campo Imperatore | CINEOS | EOS | 2.4 km | MPC · JPL |
| 635397 | 2013 MQ_{7} | — | January 27, 2012 | Mount Lemmon | Mount Lemmon Survey | · | 1.5 km | MPC · JPL |
| 635398 | 2013 MK_{21} | — | June 18, 2013 | Haleakala | Pan-STARRS 1 | · | 1.5 km | MPC · JPL |
| 635399 | 2013 NW_{5} | — | February 23, 2007 | Mount Lemmon | Mount Lemmon Survey | · | 1.5 km | MPC · JPL |
| 635400 | 2013 NH_{7} | — | July 2, 2013 | Haleakala | Pan-STARRS 1 | · | 1.5 km | MPC · JPL |

== 635401–635500 ==
back to top

| Designation | | | Discovery | | | Properties | | Ref |
| Permanent | Provisional | Named after | Date | Site | Discoverer(s) | Category | Diam. | Ref |
|---|---|---|---|---|---|---|---|---|
| 635401 | 2013 NK_{25} | — | July 6, 2013 | Haleakala | Pan-STARRS 1 | · | 1.7 km | MPC · JPL |
| 635402 | 2013 NW_{48} | — | July 1, 2013 | Haleakala | Pan-STARRS 1 | · | 1.4 km | MPC · JPL |
| 635403 | 2013 ND_{50} | — | July 13, 2013 | Haleakala | Pan-STARRS 1 | KOR | 1.1 km | MPC · JPL |
| 635404 | 2013 ND_{52} | — | July 13, 2013 | Haleakala | Pan-STARRS 1 | MRX | 790 m | MPC · JPL |
| 635405 | 2013 NC_{58} | — | July 12, 2013 | Haleakala | Pan-STARRS 1 | · | 1.4 km | MPC · JPL |
| 635406 | 2013 NK_{59} | — | November 25, 2005 | Mount Lemmon | Mount Lemmon Survey | · | 1.5 km | MPC · JPL |
| 635407 | 2013 NV_{59} | — | July 15, 2013 | Haleakala | Pan-STARRS 1 | · | 1.4 km | MPC · JPL |
| 635408 | 2013 NL_{60} | — | July 14, 2013 | Haleakala | Pan-STARRS 1 | HOF | 1.9 km | MPC · JPL |
| 635409 | 2013 NT_{65} | — | July 1, 2013 | Haleakala | Pan-STARRS 1 | AGN | 890 m | MPC · JPL |
| 635410 | 2013 NK_{69} | — | September 18, 2009 | Kitt Peak | Spacewatch | PAD | 1.1 km | MPC · JPL |
| 635411 | 2013 NO_{77} | — | July 13, 2013 | Haleakala | Pan-STARRS 1 | AGN | 740 m | MPC · JPL |
| 635412 | 2013 OT_{1} | — | August 15, 2002 | Palomar | NEAT | · | 3.6 km | MPC · JPL |
| 635413 | 2013 OV_{6} | — | May 9, 2006 | Kitt Peak | Spacewatch | EOS | 2.1 km | MPC · JPL |
| 635414 | 2013 OX_{8} | — | January 10, 2007 | Mount Lemmon | Mount Lemmon Survey | · | 2.4 km | MPC · JPL |
| 635415 | 2013 OZ_{11} | — | May 30, 2008 | Mount Lemmon | Mount Lemmon Survey | · | 1.9 km | MPC · JPL |
| 635416 | 2013 OB_{12} | — | September 16, 2002 | Palomar | NEAT | · | 2.9 km | MPC · JPL |
| 635417 | 2013 OM_{17} | — | July 16, 2013 | Haleakala | Pan-STARRS 1 | · | 1.5 km | MPC · JPL |
| 635418 | 2013 PL_{4} | — | August 2, 2013 | Palomar | Palomar Transient Factory | · | 910 m | MPC · JPL |
| 635419 | 2013 PL_{7} | — | September 18, 2003 | Palomar | NEAT | · | 890 m | MPC · JPL |
| 635420 | 2013 PB_{12} | — | August 5, 2013 | Palomar | Palomar Transient Factory | · | 3.4 km | MPC · JPL |
| 635421 | 2013 PW_{13} | — | February 10, 2008 | Kitt Peak | Spacewatch | PHO | 1.2 km | MPC · JPL |
| 635422 | 2013 PF_{14} | — | October 18, 2003 | Palomar | NEAT | · | 840 m | MPC · JPL |
| 635423 | 2013 PP_{21} | — | April 17, 2007 | Molėtai | K. Černis, J. Zdanavičius | · | 1.8 km | MPC · JPL |
| 635424 | 2013 PT_{25} | — | May 8, 2005 | Siding Spring | SSS | · | 1.5 km | MPC · JPL |
| 635425 | 2013 PN_{30} | — | October 5, 2004 | Kitt Peak | Spacewatch | AGN | 910 m | MPC · JPL |
| 635426 | 2013 PX_{32} | — | February 26, 2012 | Mount Lemmon | Mount Lemmon Survey | DOR | 2.3 km | MPC · JPL |
| 635427 | 2013 PJ_{35} | — | August 9, 2013 | Kitt Peak | Spacewatch | · | 630 m | MPC · JPL |
| 635428 | 2013 PG_{38} | — | August 12, 2013 | Haleakala | Pan-STARRS 1 | · | 1.4 km | MPC · JPL |
| 635429 | 2013 PP_{46} | — | July 15, 2013 | Haleakala | Pan-STARRS 1 | EOS | 1.4 km | MPC · JPL |
| 635430 | 2013 PC_{50} | — | September 19, 2003 | Kitt Peak | Spacewatch | · | 720 m | MPC · JPL |
| 635431 | 2013 PY_{56} | — | October 28, 2005 | Kitt Peak | Spacewatch | · | 1.5 km | MPC · JPL |
| 635432 | 2013 PT_{65} | — | May 20, 2013 | Haleakala | Pan-STARRS 1 | · | 630 m | MPC · JPL |
| 635433 | 2013 PD_{66} | — | December 21, 2000 | Whipple | T. B. Spahr | · | 2.8 km | MPC · JPL |
| 635434 | 2013 PA_{71} | — | January 31, 2011 | Piszkés-tető | K. Sárneczky, Z. Kuli | · | 2.1 km | MPC · JPL |
| 635435 | 2013 PK_{73} | — | August 2, 2013 | Palomar | Palomar Transient Factory | LIX | 4.0 km | MPC · JPL |
| 635436 | 2013 PN_{77} | — | September 7, 2008 | Mount Lemmon | Mount Lemmon Survey | KOR | 1.1 km | MPC · JPL |
| 635437 | 2013 PK_{82} | — | February 22, 1995 | Kitt Peak | Spacewatch | · | 670 m | MPC · JPL |
| 635438 | 2013 PL_{83} | — | August 3, 2013 | Haleakala | Pan-STARRS 1 | · | 1.6 km | MPC · JPL |
| 635439 | 2013 PA_{84} | — | February 3, 2012 | Mount Lemmon | Mount Lemmon Survey | · | 600 m | MPC · JPL |
| 635440 | 2013 PM_{100} | — | August 12, 2013 | Haleakala | Pan-STARRS 1 | KOR | 1.1 km | MPC · JPL |
| 635441 | 2013 PN_{100} | — | August 4, 2013 | Haleakala | Pan-STARRS 1 | KOR | 1.2 km | MPC · JPL |
| 635442 | 2013 PD_{111} | — | August 15, 2013 | Haleakala | Pan-STARRS 1 | · | 1.5 km | MPC · JPL |
| 635443 | 2013 PX_{121} | — | February 8, 2011 | Mount Lemmon | Mount Lemmon Survey | · | 1.6 km | MPC · JPL |
| 635444 | 2013 PA_{122} | — | August 15, 2013 | Haleakala | Pan-STARRS 1 | · | 1.4 km | MPC · JPL |
| 635445 | 2013 PP_{126} | — | August 12, 2013 | Haleakala | Pan-STARRS 1 | TEL | 960 m | MPC · JPL |
| 635446 | 2013 PD_{133} | — | January 30, 2006 | Kitt Peak | Spacewatch | HOF | 1.9 km | MPC · JPL |
| 635447 | 2013 PQ_{138} | — | August 4, 2013 | Haleakala | Pan-STARRS 1 | AST | 1.2 km | MPC · JPL |
| 635448 | 2013 QW_{2} | — | April 12, 2012 | Haleakala | Pan-STARRS 1 | · | 1.7 km | MPC · JPL |
| 635449 | 2013 QM_{9} | — | September 18, 2003 | Kitt Peak | Spacewatch | KOR | 1.2 km | MPC · JPL |
| 635450 | 2013 QZ_{9} | — | February 7, 2002 | Palomar | NEAT | · | 2.0 km | MPC · JPL |
| 635451 | 2013 QJ_{12} | — | September 19, 2003 | Palomar | NEAT | · | 710 m | MPC · JPL |
| 635452 | 2013 QQ_{14} | — | September 5, 2002 | Apache Point | SDSS | · | 2.6 km | MPC · JPL |
| 635453 | 2013 QF_{15} | — | August 12, 2013 | Kitt Peak | Spacewatch | HOF | 2.5 km | MPC · JPL |
| 635454 | 2013 QQ_{22} | — | March 16, 2009 | Kitt Peak | Spacewatch | · | 720 m | MPC · JPL |
| 635455 | 2013 QJ_{23} | — | March 23, 2006 | Mount Lemmon | Mount Lemmon Survey | · | 2.3 km | MPC · JPL |
| 635456 | 2013 QK_{23} | — | August 9, 2013 | Kitt Peak | Spacewatch | · | 1.6 km | MPC · JPL |
| 635457 | 2013 QE_{30} | — | March 21, 2012 | Mount Lemmon | Mount Lemmon Survey | · | 1.6 km | MPC · JPL |
| 635458 | 2013 QG_{35} | — | August 26, 2003 | Cerro Tololo | Deep Ecliptic Survey | · | 660 m | MPC · JPL |
| 635459 | 2013 QE_{42} | — | August 28, 2013 | Mount Lemmon | Mount Lemmon Survey | HOF | 1.9 km | MPC · JPL |
| 635460 | 2013 QB_{44} | — | August 22, 2003 | Palomar | NEAT | · | 740 m | MPC · JPL |
| 635461 | 2013 QD_{46} | — | October 18, 2003 | Palomar | NEAT | · | 800 m | MPC · JPL |
| 635462 | 2013 QC_{49} | — | August 28, 2013 | Cerro Tololo-LCO A | Lister, T. | EOS | 1.5 km | MPC · JPL |
| 635463 | 2013 QE_{51} | — | October 22, 2003 | Kitt Peak | Deep Ecliptic Survey | · | 610 m | MPC · JPL |
| 635464 | 2013 QN_{53} | — | April 26, 2006 | Cerro Tololo | Deep Ecliptic Survey | · | 1.5 km | MPC · JPL |
| 635465 | 2013 QZ_{57} | — | April 22, 2009 | Kitt Peak | Spacewatch | · | 600 m | MPC · JPL |
| 635466 | 2013 QS_{58} | — | November 14, 2007 | Mount Lemmon | Mount Lemmon Survey | · | 590 m | MPC · JPL |
| 635467 | 2013 QB_{67} | — | September 25, 2008 | Kitt Peak | Spacewatch | EOS | 1.9 km | MPC · JPL |
| 635468 | 2013 QK_{69} | — | March 22, 2012 | Mount Lemmon | Mount Lemmon Survey | · | 2.0 km | MPC · JPL |
| 635469 | 2013 QZ_{72} | — | September 5, 2000 | Apache Point | SDSS Collaboration | · | 640 m | MPC · JPL |
| 635470 | 2013 QU_{76} | — | February 7, 2006 | Kitt Peak | Spacewatch | · | 1.8 km | MPC · JPL |
| 635471 | 2013 QT_{82} | — | March 9, 2011 | Kitt Peak | Spacewatch | · | 4.9 km | MPC · JPL |
| 635472 | 2013 QS_{87} | — | December 11, 2009 | Mount Lemmon | Mount Lemmon Survey | KOR | 1.2 km | MPC · JPL |
| 635473 | 2013 QV_{87} | — | August 24, 2003 | Cerro Tololo | Deep Ecliptic Survey | KOR | 1.1 km | MPC · JPL |
| 635474 | 2013 QT_{90} | — | August 26, 2003 | Cerro Tololo | Deep Ecliptic Survey | KOR | 1.1 km | MPC · JPL |
| 635475 | 2013 QT_{94} | — | April 19, 2007 | Mount Lemmon | Mount Lemmon Survey | · | 1.6 km | MPC · JPL |
| 635476 | 2013 QO_{103} | — | August 28, 2013 | Mount Lemmon | Mount Lemmon Survey | KOR | 1.0 km | MPC · JPL |
| 635477 | 2013 RJ_{17} | — | September 30, 2010 | Kitt Peak | Spacewatch | · | 580 m | MPC · JPL |
| 635478 Fotonikalv | 2013 RH_{24} | Fotonikalv | September 4, 2013 | Baldone | K. Černis, I. Eglītis | EOS | 1.8 km | MPC · JPL |
| 635479 | 2013 RL_{25} | — | September 18, 2003 | Kitt Peak | Spacewatch | · | 790 m | MPC · JPL |
| 635480 | 2013 RZ_{25} | — | September 19, 2003 | Anderson Mesa | LONEOS | · | 1.1 km | MPC · JPL |
| 635481 | 2013 RG_{27} | — | September 4, 2013 | Elena Remote | Oreshko, A. | · | 1.7 km | MPC · JPL |
| 635482 | 2013 RY_{33} | — | February 14, 2005 | Kitt Peak | Spacewatch | · | 4.0 km | MPC · JPL |
| 635483 Casimir | 2013 RU_{34} | Casimir | September 4, 2013 | Baldone | K. Černis, I. Eglītis | · | 630 m | MPC · JPL |
| 635484 | 2013 RG_{35} | — | August 20, 2006 | Palomar | NEAT | · | 800 m | MPC · JPL |
| 635485 | 2013 RE_{50} | — | January 10, 2008 | Mount Lemmon | Mount Lemmon Survey | · | 1.2 km | MPC · JPL |
| 635486 | 2013 RQ_{51} | — | November 8, 2007 | Kitt Peak | Spacewatch | · | 800 m | MPC · JPL |
| 635487 | 2013 RG_{52} | — | March 16, 2012 | Haleakala | Pan-STARRS 1 | · | 770 m | MPC · JPL |
| 635488 | 2013 RS_{62} | — | September 12, 2013 | Mount Lemmon | Mount Lemmon Survey | · | 520 m | MPC · JPL |
| 635489 | 2013 RH_{65} | — | March 6, 2011 | Mount Lemmon | Mount Lemmon Survey | · | 1.5 km | MPC · JPL |
| 635490 | 2013 RB_{66} | — | September 7, 2008 | Mount Lemmon | Mount Lemmon Survey | KOR | 1.1 km | MPC · JPL |
| 635491 | 2013 RD_{69} | — | December 12, 2004 | Kitt Peak | Spacewatch | · | 2.7 km | MPC · JPL |
| 635492 | 2013 RR_{75} | — | September 12, 2013 | Kitt Peak | Spacewatch | · | 1.7 km | MPC · JPL |
| 635493 | 2013 RV_{76} | — | October 6, 2004 | Kitt Peak | Spacewatch | · | 2.0 km | MPC · JPL |
| 635494 | 2013 RY_{92} | — | March 14, 2011 | Mount Lemmon | Mount Lemmon Survey | AGN | 1.1 km | MPC · JPL |
| 635495 | 2013 RY_{96} | — | August 23, 2003 | Palomar | NEAT | · | 640 m | MPC · JPL |
| 635496 | 2013 RA_{98} | — | December 1, 2014 | Haleakala | Pan-STARRS 1 | · | 1.9 km | MPC · JPL |
| 635497 | 2013 RL_{100} | — | March 17, 2005 | Mount Lemmon | Mount Lemmon Survey | VER | 2.6 km | MPC · JPL |
| 635498 | 2013 RV_{101} | — | November 7, 2010 | Mount Lemmon | Mount Lemmon Survey | · | 540 m | MPC · JPL |
| 635499 | 2013 RG_{110} | — | September 13, 2013 | Mount Lemmon | Mount Lemmon Survey | L5 | 6.2 km | MPC · JPL |
| 635500 | 2013 RC_{124} | — | September 13, 2013 | Mount Lemmon | Mount Lemmon Survey | KOR | 990 m | MPC · JPL |

== 635501–635600 ==
back to top

| Designation | | | Discovery | | | Properties | | Ref |
| Permanent | Provisional | Named after | Date | Site | Discoverer(s) | Category | Diam. | Ref |
|---|---|---|---|---|---|---|---|---|
| 635501 | 2013 RT_{136} | — | September 12, 2013 | Mount Lemmon | Mount Lemmon Survey | · | 600 m | MPC · JPL |
| 635502 | 2013 RV_{136} | — | September 4, 2013 | Mount Lemmon | Mount Lemmon Survey | AGN | 950 m | MPC · JPL |
| 635503 | 2013 RL_{137} | — | September 3, 2013 | Calar Alto | F. Hormuth | EOS | 1.3 km | MPC · JPL |
| 635504 | 2013 RK_{148} | — | September 2, 2013 | Mount Lemmon | Mount Lemmon Survey | KOR | 1.0 km | MPC · JPL |
| 635505 | 2013 RD_{176} | — | February 9, 2010 | Mount Lemmon | Mount Lemmon Survey | · | 1.4 km | MPC · JPL |
| 635506 | 2013 SP_{11} | — | June 19, 2006 | Mount Lemmon | Mount Lemmon Survey | · | 650 m | MPC · JPL |
| 635507 | 2013 SY_{25} | — | October 22, 2003 | Apache Point | SDSS Collaboration | · | 1.8 km | MPC · JPL |
| 635508 | 2013 SM_{27} | — | October 21, 2003 | Palomar | NEAT | · | 770 m | MPC · JPL |
| 635509 | 2013 SQ_{29} | — | May 12, 2001 | Eskridge | G. Hug | · | 3.6 km | MPC · JPL |
| 635510 | 2013 SA_{35} | — | October 29, 2010 | Piszkés-tető | K. Sárneczky, Z. Kuli | · | 590 m | MPC · JPL |
| 635511 | 2013 SM_{43} | — | August 23, 2003 | Palomar | NEAT | · | 1.1 km | MPC · JPL |
| 635512 | 2013 SS_{50} | — | December 11, 2006 | Kitt Peak | Spacewatch | CLA | 1.8 km | MPC · JPL |
| 635513 | 2013 SG_{54} | — | December 3, 2005 | Mauna Kea | A. Boattini | KOR | 1.1 km | MPC · JPL |
| 635514 | 2013 SA_{64} | — | September 14, 2002 | Palomar | NEAT | · | 2.6 km | MPC · JPL |
| 635515 | 2013 SY_{72} | — | September 25, 2003 | Haleakala | NEAT | · | 750 m | MPC · JPL |
| 635516 | 2013 SQ_{79} | — | August 19, 2006 | Palomar | NEAT | · | 780 m | MPC · JPL |
| 635517 | 2013 SA_{83} | — | October 25, 2001 | Apache Point | SDSS Collaboration | · | 1.1 km | MPC · JPL |
| 635518 | 2013 SQ_{85} | — | February 9, 2008 | Mount Lemmon | Mount Lemmon Survey | · | 680 m | MPC · JPL |
| 635519 | 2013 SR_{93} | — | October 17, 2010 | Mount Lemmon | Mount Lemmon Survey | · | 600 m | MPC · JPL |
| 635520 | 2013 SA_{96} | — | November 2, 2010 | Mount Lemmon | Mount Lemmon Survey | · | 570 m | MPC · JPL |
| 635521 | 2013 SV_{97} | — | May 4, 2009 | Mount Lemmon | Mount Lemmon Survey | · | 560 m | MPC · JPL |
| 635522 | 2013 TX_{7} | — | September 14, 2004 | Goodricke-Pigott | R. A. Tucker | · | 2.4 km | MPC · JPL |
| 635523 | 2013 TF_{8} | — | October 3, 2013 | Haleakala | Pan-STARRS 1 | · | 670 m | MPC · JPL |
| 635524 | 2013 TW_{9} | — | September 20, 2003 | Palomar | NEAT | · | 920 m | MPC · JPL |
| 635525 | 2013 TS_{11} | — | March 8, 2005 | Mount Lemmon | Mount Lemmon Survey | · | 800 m | MPC · JPL |
| 635526 | 2013 TA_{17} | — | August 23, 2003 | Palomar | NEAT | · | 670 m | MPC · JPL |
| 635527 | 2013 TV_{39} | — | October 1, 2003 | Kitt Peak | Spacewatch | · | 710 m | MPC · JPL |
| 635528 | 2013 TH_{41} | — | August 11, 2002 | Palomar | NEAT | · | 1.7 km | MPC · JPL |
| 635529 | 2013 TA_{45} | — | September 5, 2000 | Apache Point | SDSS | L5 | 10 km | MPC · JPL |
| 635530 | 2013 TJ_{57} | — | November 9, 2009 | Kitt Peak | Spacewatch | · | 2.8 km | MPC · JPL |
| 635531 | 2013 TQ_{61} | — | September 3, 2008 | Kitt Peak | Spacewatch | · | 1.7 km | MPC · JPL |
| 635532 | 2013 TW_{65} | — | September 20, 2003 | Kitt Peak | Spacewatch | · | 700 m | MPC · JPL |
| 635533 | 2013 TK_{68} | — | September 18, 2003 | Palomar | NEAT | · | 730 m | MPC · JPL |
| 635534 | 2013 TM_{76} | — | June 12, 2012 | Kitt Peak | Spacewatch | · | 2.6 km | MPC · JPL |
| 635535 | 2013 TY_{81} | — | November 1, 2010 | Mount Lemmon | Mount Lemmon Survey | · | 520 m | MPC · JPL |
| 635536 | 2013 TA_{85} | — | August 28, 2003 | Palomar | NEAT | · | 900 m | MPC · JPL |
| 635537 | 2013 TB_{85} | — | September 21, 2003 | Kitt Peak | Spacewatch | · | 710 m | MPC · JPL |
| 635538 | 2013 TE_{86} | — | October 1, 2013 | Mount Lemmon | Mount Lemmon Survey | KOR | 990 m | MPC · JPL |
| 635539 | 2013 TL_{86} | — | October 1, 2013 | Mount Lemmon | Mount Lemmon Survey | · | 550 m | MPC · JPL |
| 635540 | 2013 TU_{93} | — | October 2, 2003 | Kitt Peak | Spacewatch | · | 880 m | MPC · JPL |
| 635541 | 2013 TH_{97} | — | April 3, 2006 | La Silla | La Silla | AGN | 1.1 km | MPC · JPL |
| 635542 | 2013 TC_{105} | — | October 23, 2003 | Kitt Peak | Spacewatch | · | 660 m | MPC · JPL |
| 635543 | 2013 TF_{108} | — | October 18, 2003 | Kitt Peak | Spacewatch | · | 780 m | MPC · JPL |
| 635544 | 2013 TL_{109} | — | February 15, 2005 | La Silla | A. Boattini, H. Scholl | · | 1.1 km | MPC · JPL |
| 635545 | 2013 TL_{111} | — | August 16, 2006 | Palomar | NEAT | · | 660 m | MPC · JPL |
| 635546 | 2013 TY_{114} | — | March 10, 2007 | Mount Lemmon | Mount Lemmon Survey | · | 1.2 km | MPC · JPL |
| 635547 | 2013 TE_{117} | — | October 4, 2013 | Mount Lemmon | Mount Lemmon Survey | · | 770 m | MPC · JPL |
| 635548 | 2013 TU_{120} | — | March 2, 2006 | Mount Lemmon | Mount Lemmon Survey | · | 2.7 km | MPC · JPL |
| 635549 | 2013 TP_{134} | — | November 19, 2003 | Kitt Peak | Spacewatch | · | 720 m | MPC · JPL |
| 635550 | 2013 TD_{149} | — | October 11, 2010 | Kitt Peak | Spacewatch | · | 660 m | MPC · JPL |
| 635551 | 2013 TK_{163} | — | October 3, 2013 | Haleakala | Pan-STARRS 1 | KOR | 990 m | MPC · JPL |
| 635552 | 2013 TD_{164} | — | September 6, 2008 | Kitt Peak | Spacewatch | · | 1.8 km | MPC · JPL |
| 635553 | 2013 TS_{169} | — | November 29, 2013 | Mount Lemmon | Mount Lemmon Survey | · | 1.7 km | MPC · JPL |
| 635554 | 2013 TQ_{195} | — | October 3, 2013 | Mount Lemmon | Mount Lemmon Survey | · | 630 m | MPC · JPL |
| 635555 | 2013 TP_{204} | — | October 7, 2013 | Kitt Peak | Spacewatch | L5 | 7.9 km | MPC · JPL |
| 635556 | 2013 TW_{217} | — | October 14, 2013 | Mount Lemmon | Mount Lemmon Survey | · | 2.5 km | MPC · JPL |
| 635557 | 2013 TO_{218} | — | October 12, 2013 | Mount Lemmon | Mount Lemmon Survey | KOR | 1.1 km | MPC · JPL |
| 635558 | 2013 TN_{221} | — | October 13, 2013 | Mount Lemmon | Mount Lemmon Survey | L5 | 6.4 km | MPC · JPL |
| 635559 | 2013 TK_{223} | — | October 9, 2013 | Mount Lemmon | Mount Lemmon Survey | KOR | 1 km | MPC · JPL |
| 635560 | 2013 TH_{224} | — | October 2, 2013 | Haleakala | Pan-STARRS 1 | · | 1.7 km | MPC · JPL |
| 635561 | 2013 TD_{236} | — | October 3, 2013 | Mount Lemmon | Mount Lemmon Survey | KOR | 1.1 km | MPC · JPL |
| 635562 | 2013 UX_{1} | — | June 13, 2002 | Palomar | NEAT | H | 730 m | MPC · JPL |
| 635563 | 2013 UT_{33} | — | October 7, 2012 | Haleakala | Pan-STARRS 1 | L5 | 8.5 km | MPC · JPL |
| 635564 | 2013 UT_{36} | — | October 25, 2013 | Haleakala | Pan-STARRS 1 | · | 590 m | MPC · JPL |
| 635565 | 2013 UF_{45} | — | October 24, 2013 | Mount Lemmon | Mount Lemmon Survey | · | 1.7 km | MPC · JPL |
| 635566 | 2013 UB_{50} | — | October 30, 2013 | Haleakala | Pan-STARRS 1 | · | 2.5 km | MPC · JPL |
| 635567 | 2013 VZ_{57} | — | November 9, 2013 | Haleakala | Pan-STARRS 1 | L5 | 8.7 km | MPC · JPL |
| 635568 | 2013 VF_{65} | — | November 2, 2013 | Mount Lemmon | Mount Lemmon Survey | · | 3.5 km | MPC · JPL |
| 635569 | 2013 VV_{66} | — | November 9, 2013 | Mount Lemmon | Mount Lemmon Survey | · | 1.6 km | MPC · JPL |
| 635570 | 2013 VR_{67} | — | November 1, 2013 | Mount Lemmon | Mount Lemmon Survey | · | 1.5 km | MPC · JPL |
| 635571 | 2013 VW_{75} | — | November 4, 2013 | Mount Lemmon | Mount Lemmon Survey | L5 | 6.1 km | MPC · JPL |
| 635572 | 2013 VF_{79} | — | July 18, 2012 | Siding Spring | SSS | · | 3.1 km | MPC · JPL |
| 635573 | 2013 VS_{80} | — | November 6, 2013 | Haleakala | Pan-STARRS 1 | 615 | 1.2 km | MPC · JPL |
| 635574 | 2013 WA_{4} | — | August 25, 2012 | Haleakala | Pan-STARRS 1 | L5 | 10 km | MPC · JPL |
| 635575 | 2013 WM_{6} | — | December 5, 2010 | Mount Lemmon | Mount Lemmon Survey | · | 910 m | MPC · JPL |
| 635576 | 2013 WP_{6} | — | January 17, 2004 | Palomar | NEAT | · | 690 m | MPC · JPL |
| 635577 | 2013 WT_{10} | — | December 19, 2003 | Needville | Dillon, W. G. | · | 770 m | MPC · JPL |
| 635578 | 2013 WJ_{12} | — | August 28, 2006 | Kitt Peak | Spacewatch | · | 580 m | MPC · JPL |
| 635579 | 2013 WT_{21} | — | July 9, 2004 | Palomar | NEAT | EUN | 1.4 km | MPC · JPL |
| 635580 | 2013 WT_{23} | — | April 4, 2003 | Anderson Mesa | LONEOS | KRM | 2.8 km | MPC · JPL |
| 635581 | 2013 WY_{31} | — | March 20, 2007 | Kitt Peak | Spacewatch | · | 880 m | MPC · JPL |
| 635582 | 2013 WX_{40} | — | December 18, 2001 | Palomar | NEAT | · | 1.4 km | MPC · JPL |
| 635583 | 2013 WL_{47} | — | February 6, 2011 | Mount Lemmon | Mount Lemmon Survey | · | 710 m | MPC · JPL |
| 635584 | 2013 WR_{61} | — | November 1, 2013 | Nogales | M. Schwartz, P. R. Holvorcem | · | 1.5 km | MPC · JPL |
| 635585 | 2013 WL_{69} | — | October 4, 2006 | Mount Lemmon | Mount Lemmon Survey | · | 800 m | MPC · JPL |
| 635586 | 2013 WQ_{70} | — | November 8, 2013 | Mount Lemmon | Mount Lemmon Survey | · | 2.6 km | MPC · JPL |
| 635587 | 2013 WP_{72} | — | March 29, 2012 | Mount Lemmon | Mount Lemmon Survey | · | 710 m | MPC · JPL |
| 635588 | 2013 WU_{91} | — | November 18, 2006 | Kitt Peak | Spacewatch | · | 1.1 km | MPC · JPL |
| 635589 | 2013 WJ_{94} | — | April 15, 2007 | Kitt Peak | Spacewatch | (5) | 970 m | MPC · JPL |
| 635590 | 2013 WL_{99} | — | August 26, 2009 | Catalina | CSS | · | 980 m | MPC · JPL |
| 635591 | 2013 WM_{102} | — | March 4, 2008 | Kitt Peak | Spacewatch | · | 560 m | MPC · JPL |
| 635592 | 2013 WV_{105} | — | October 29, 2008 | Mount Lemmon | Mount Lemmon Survey | · | 2.5 km | MPC · JPL |
| 635593 | 2013 WX_{113} | — | November 28, 2013 | Mount Lemmon | Mount Lemmon Survey | PHO | 1.2 km | MPC · JPL |
| 635594 | 2013 WE_{135} | — | November 26, 2013 | Haleakala | Pan-STARRS 1 | · | 2.7 km | MPC · JPL |
| 635595 | 2013 WG_{135} | — | November 28, 2013 | Haleakala | Pan-STARRS 1 | · | 2.1 km | MPC · JPL |
| 635596 | 2013 WJ_{135} | — | November 27, 2013 | Haleakala | Pan-STARRS 1 | · | 2.5 km | MPC · JPL |
| 635597 | 2013 WX_{140} | — | November 27, 2013 | Haleakala | Pan-STARRS 1 | · | 1.7 km | MPC · JPL |
| 635598 | 2013 XM | — | February 29, 2004 | Kitt Peak | Spacewatch | · | 920 m | MPC · JPL |
| 635599 | 2013 XC_{15} | — | November 26, 2003 | Kitt Peak | Spacewatch | · | 620 m | MPC · JPL |
| 635600 | 2013 XU_{16} | — | October 20, 2006 | Mount Lemmon | Mount Lemmon Survey | V | 760 m | MPC · JPL |

== 635601–635700 ==
back to top

| Designation | | | Discovery | | | Properties | | Ref |
| Permanent | Provisional | Named after | Date | Site | Discoverer(s) | Category | Diam. | Ref |
|---|---|---|---|---|---|---|---|---|
| 635601 | 2013 XR_{22} | — | December 6, 2008 | Kitt Peak | Spacewatch | · | 3.1 km | MPC · JPL |
| 635602 | 2013 XU_{25} | — | May 21, 2012 | Mount Lemmon | Mount Lemmon Survey | EUN | 1.7 km | MPC · JPL |
| 635603 | 2013 XJ_{36} | — | August 17, 2009 | Kitt Peak | Spacewatch | · | 680 m | MPC · JPL |
| 635604 | 2013 XU_{38} | — | December 11, 2013 | Haleakala | Pan-STARRS 1 | · | 2.3 km | MPC · JPL |
| 635605 | 2013 XX_{38} | — | December 7, 2013 | Haleakala | Pan-STARRS 1 | · | 2.1 km | MPC · JPL |
| 635606 | 2013 XK_{43} | — | December 7, 2013 | Haleakala | Pan-STARRS 1 | VER | 2.0 km | MPC · JPL |
| 635607 | 2013 YZ_{3} | — | December 23, 2013 | Mount Lemmon | Mount Lemmon Survey | · | 2.4 km | MPC · JPL |
| 635608 | 2013 YW_{6} | — | April 1, 2003 | Kitt Peak | Deep Ecliptic Survey | · | 1.4 km | MPC · JPL |
| 635609 | 2013 YH_{8} | — | December 24, 2006 | Catalina | CSS | · | 1.0 km | MPC · JPL |
| 635610 | 2013 YO_{10} | — | December 3, 2002 | Palomar | NEAT | · | 2.7 km | MPC · JPL |
| 635611 | 2013 YX_{11} | — | November 24, 2002 | Palomar | NEAT | · | 1.2 km | MPC · JPL |
| 635612 | 2013 YK_{15} | — | March 15, 2004 | Palomar | NEAT | · | 3.1 km | MPC · JPL |
| 635613 | 2013 YA_{17} | — | October 24, 2009 | Kitt Peak | Spacewatch | · | 820 m | MPC · JPL |
| 635614 | 2013 YL_{30} | — | January 25, 2003 | Palomar | NEAT | URS | 4.4 km | MPC · JPL |
| 635615 | 2013 YY_{35} | — | August 23, 2003 | Palomar | NEAT | · | 2.6 km | MPC · JPL |
| 635616 | 2013 YL_{39} | — | July 1, 2005 | Kitt Peak | Spacewatch | · | 3.6 km | MPC · JPL |
| 635617 | 2013 YZ_{43} | — | December 21, 2006 | Kitt Peak | Spacewatch | · | 960 m | MPC · JPL |
| 635618 | 2013 YQ_{45} | — | March 20, 2001 | Haleakala | NEAT | · | 2.3 km | MPC · JPL |
| 635619 | 2013 YQ_{46} | — | December 27, 2013 | Kitt Peak | Spacewatch | · | 970 m | MPC · JPL |
| 635620 | 2013 YW_{49} | — | May 27, 2011 | Nogales | M. Schwartz, P. R. Holvorcem | · | 1.3 km | MPC · JPL |
| 635621 | 2013 YO_{50} | — | December 24, 2013 | Mount Lemmon | Mount Lemmon Survey | V | 610 m | MPC · JPL |
| 635622 | 2013 YZ_{56} | — | May 8, 2005 | Kitt Peak | Spacewatch | EOS | 1.7 km | MPC · JPL |
| 635623 | 2013 YP_{57} | — | November 15, 2006 | Catalina | CSS | · | 790 m | MPC · JPL |
| 635624 | 2013 YK_{58} | — | September 16, 2001 | Socorro | LINEAR | · | 1.5 km | MPC · JPL |
| 635625 | 2013 YZ_{63} | — | January 19, 1996 | Kitt Peak | Spacewatch | · | 900 m | MPC · JPL |
| 635626 | 2013 YF_{66} | — | December 29, 2013 | Catalina | CSS | · | 940 m | MPC · JPL |
| 635627 | 2013 YQ_{67} | — | January 2, 2009 | Kitt Peak | Spacewatch | · | 1.6 km | MPC · JPL |
| 635628 | 2013 YG_{68} | — | February 9, 2003 | Palomar | NEAT | V | 760 m | MPC · JPL |
| 635629 | 2013 YK_{68} | — | January 16, 2005 | Kitt Peak | Spacewatch | · | 2.3 km | MPC · JPL |
| 635630 | 2013 YV_{77} | — | November 9, 2009 | Kitt Peak | Spacewatch | · | 800 m | MPC · JPL |
| 635631 | 2013 YQ_{79} | — | October 1, 2005 | Mount Lemmon | Mount Lemmon Survey | NYS | 1.0 km | MPC · JPL |
| 635632 | 2013 YJ_{80} | — | December 27, 2006 | Mount Lemmon | Mount Lemmon Survey | V | 680 m | MPC · JPL |
| 635633 | 2013 YS_{84} | — | February 10, 2007 | Mount Lemmon | Mount Lemmon Survey | · | 760 m | MPC · JPL |
| 635634 | 2013 YK_{93} | — | September 3, 2008 | Kitt Peak | Spacewatch | · | 1.3 km | MPC · JPL |
| 635635 | 2013 YN_{96} | — | January 29, 2003 | Mount Graham | Ryan, W., Ryan, E. | · | 2.8 km | MPC · JPL |
| 635636 | 2013 YP_{99} | — | July 24, 2003 | Palomar | NEAT | · | 1.8 km | MPC · JPL |
| 635637 | 2013 YK_{105} | — | August 11, 2007 | Bergisch Gladbach | W. Bickel | L4 | 9.7 km | MPC · JPL |
| 635638 | 2013 YL_{106} | — | December 30, 2013 | Haleakala | Pan-STARRS 1 | · | 2.5 km | MPC · JPL |
| 635639 | 2013 YB_{111} | — | January 27, 2003 | Socorro | LINEAR | V | 860 m | MPC · JPL |
| 635640 | 2013 YL_{115} | — | February 12, 2000 | Apache Point | SDSS | · | 1.1 km | MPC · JPL |
| 635641 | 2013 YY_{116} | — | August 22, 2003 | Palomar | NEAT | · | 1.8 km | MPC · JPL |
| 635642 | 2013 YK_{118} | — | December 7, 2013 | Kitt Peak | Spacewatch | · | 590 m | MPC · JPL |
| 635643 | 2013 YT_{122} | — | February 7, 2007 | Kitt Peak | Spacewatch | · | 910 m | MPC · JPL |
| 635644 | 2013 YG_{123} | — | December 30, 2013 | Kitt Peak | Spacewatch | · | 1.1 km | MPC · JPL |
| 635645 | 2013 YS_{123} | — | December 30, 2013 | Kitt Peak | Spacewatch | · | 700 m | MPC · JPL |
| 635646 | 2013 YE_{129} | — | December 4, 2013 | Haleakala | Pan-STARRS 1 | · | 3.7 km | MPC · JPL |
| 635647 | 2013 YL_{140} | — | February 19, 2010 | Mount Lemmon | Mount Lemmon Survey | · | 1.9 km | MPC · JPL |
| 635648 | 2013 YU_{146} | — | December 31, 2013 | Mount Lemmon | Mount Lemmon Survey | · | 2.0 km | MPC · JPL |
| 635649 | 2013 YQ_{152} | — | December 31, 2013 | Haleakala | Pan-STARRS 1 | · | 2.2 km | MPC · JPL |
| 635650 | 2013 YO_{153} | — | March 31, 2003 | Kitt Peak | Spacewatch | · | 990 m | MPC · JPL |
| 635651 | 2013 YY_{161} | — | December 30, 2013 | Mount Lemmon | Mount Lemmon Survey | · | 780 m | MPC · JPL |
| 635652 | 2013 YE_{171} | — | December 31, 2013 | Kitt Peak | Spacewatch | · | 1 km | MPC · JPL |
| 635653 | 2013 YT_{171} | — | December 31, 2013 | Mount Lemmon | Mount Lemmon Survey | · | 2.3 km | MPC · JPL |
| 635654 | 2013 YZ_{172} | — | December 31, 2013 | Kitt Peak | Spacewatch | · | 3.1 km | MPC · JPL |
| 635655 | 2014 AO_{1} | — | April 14, 2011 | Mount Lemmon | Mount Lemmon Survey | · | 890 m | MPC · JPL |
| 635656 | 2014 AR_{1} | — | February 22, 2003 | Anderson Mesa | LONEOS | · | 1.6 km | MPC · JPL |
| 635657 | 2014 AB_{5} | — | March 23, 2003 | Kitt Peak | Spacewatch | · | 1.3 km | MPC · JPL |
| 635658 | 2014 AC_{7} | — | September 19, 1995 | Kitt Peak | Spacewatch | · | 730 m | MPC · JPL |
| 635659 | 2014 AF_{8} | — | January 1, 2014 | Haleakala | Pan-STARRS 1 | · | 1.9 km | MPC · JPL |
| 635660 | 2014 AO_{10} | — | August 25, 1995 | Kitt Peak | Spacewatch | · | 2.7 km | MPC · JPL |
| 635661 | 2014 AN_{11} | — | November 29, 2013 | Haleakala | Pan-STARRS 1 | · | 1.9 km | MPC · JPL |
| 635662 | 2014 AD_{23} | — | July 31, 2000 | Cerro Tololo | Deep Ecliptic Survey | MAS | 840 m | MPC · JPL |
| 635663 | 2014 AG_{26} | — | August 31, 2011 | Haleakala | Pan-STARRS 1 | · | 2.8 km | MPC · JPL |
| 635664 | 2014 AM_{27} | — | January 4, 2014 | Haleakala | Pan-STARRS 1 | V | 570 m | MPC · JPL |
| 635665 | 2014 AQ_{29} | — | January 1, 2014 | Kitt Peak | Spacewatch | · | 3.2 km | MPC · JPL |
| 635666 | 2014 AM_{31} | — | January 4, 2014 | Mount Lemmon | Mount Lemmon Survey | EOS | 1.4 km | MPC · JPL |
| 635667 | 2014 AP_{33} | — | December 11, 2013 | Haleakala | Pan-STARRS 1 | · | 2.1 km | MPC · JPL |
| 635668 | 2014 AN_{40} | — | December 6, 2013 | Haleakala | Pan-STARRS 1 | · | 860 m | MPC · JPL |
| 635669 | 2014 AM_{44} | — | October 18, 1999 | Kitt Peak | Spacewatch | · | 1.7 km | MPC · JPL |
| 635670 | 2014 AM_{45} | — | September 19, 1998 | Apache Point | SDSS | · | 2.2 km | MPC · JPL |
| 635671 | 2014 AA_{58} | — | March 9, 2011 | Mount Lemmon | Mount Lemmon Survey | V | 570 m | MPC · JPL |
| 635672 | 2014 AC_{58} | — | January 29, 2009 | Mount Lemmon | Mount Lemmon Survey | EOS | 1.4 km | MPC · JPL |
| 635673 | 2014 AV_{59} | — | January 12, 2003 | Kitt Peak | Spacewatch | · | 2.6 km | MPC · JPL |
| 635674 | 2014 AE_{70} | — | January 3, 2014 | Kitt Peak | Spacewatch | · | 2.2 km | MPC · JPL |
| 635675 | 2014 AC_{78} | — | January 5, 2014 | Haleakala | Pan-STARRS 1 | · | 2.6 km | MPC · JPL |
| 635676 | 2014 AA_{80} | — | January 10, 2014 | Mount Lemmon | Mount Lemmon Survey | · | 2.1 km | MPC · JPL |
| 635677 | 2014 BK_{5} | — | October 20, 2012 | Haleakala | Pan-STARRS 1 | EOS | 1.9 km | MPC · JPL |
| 635678 | 2014 BF_{6} | — | October 29, 2005 | Kitt Peak | Spacewatch | · | 1.3 km | MPC · JPL |
| 635679 | 2014 BR_{10} | — | March 26, 2003 | Palomar | NEAT | NYS | 1.2 km | MPC · JPL |
| 635680 | 2014 BA_{11} | — | January 7, 2014 | Oukaïmeden | M. Ory | · | 1.2 km | MPC · JPL |
| 635681 | 2014 BR_{11} | — | April 2, 2011 | Haleakala | Pan-STARRS 1 | · | 780 m | MPC · JPL |
| 635682 | 2014 BC_{15} | — | September 10, 2007 | Mount Lemmon | Mount Lemmon Survey | · | 1.8 km | MPC · JPL |
| 635683 | 2014 BU_{16} | — | September 12, 1994 | Kitt Peak | Spacewatch | NEM | 2.2 km | MPC · JPL |
| 635684 | 2014 BK_{18} | — | January 21, 2014 | Mount Lemmon | Mount Lemmon Survey | · | 2.8 km | MPC · JPL |
| 635685 | 2014 BF_{23} | — | September 21, 2012 | Kitt Peak | Spacewatch | V | 620 m | MPC · JPL |
| 635686 | 2014 BK_{27} | — | December 31, 2013 | Haleakala | Pan-STARRS 1 | · | 890 m | MPC · JPL |
| 635687 | 2014 BD_{29} | — | January 21, 2014 | Mount Lemmon | Mount Lemmon Survey | · | 1.0 km | MPC · JPL |
| 635688 | 2014 BA_{30} | — | September 11, 2005 | Kitt Peak | Spacewatch | · | 820 m | MPC · JPL |
| 635689 | 2014 BE_{30} | — | September 30, 2005 | Mount Lemmon | Mount Lemmon Survey | · | 1.0 km | MPC · JPL |
| 635690 | 2014 BA_{31} | — | January 23, 2014 | Mount Lemmon | Mount Lemmon Survey | · | 1.0 km | MPC · JPL |
| 635691 | 2014 BY_{33} | — | September 20, 2012 | Mayhill-ISON | L. Elenin | AGN | 1.3 km | MPC · JPL |
| 635692 | 2014 BD_{34} | — | August 31, 2005 | Palomar | NEAT | V | 710 m | MPC · JPL |
| 635693 | 2014 BP_{34} | — | August 28, 2000 | Cerro Tololo | Deep Ecliptic Survey | · | 3.9 km | MPC · JPL |
| 635694 | 2014 BT_{36} | — | January 29, 2003 | Kitt Peak | Spacewatch | · | 1.1 km | MPC · JPL |
| 635695 | 2014 BX_{36} | — | February 3, 2003 | Palomar | NEAT | · | 1.1 km | MPC · JPL |
| 635696 | 2014 BV_{38} | — | November 21, 2001 | Apache Point | SDSS Collaboration | LUT | 4.4 km | MPC · JPL |
| 635697 | 2014 BM_{40} | — | January 24, 2014 | Haleakala | Pan-STARRS 1 | · | 2.2 km | MPC · JPL |
| 635698 | 2014 BG_{41} | — | January 24, 2014 | Haleakala | Pan-STARRS 1 | · | 1.0 km | MPC · JPL |
| 635699 | 2014 BG_{42} | — | October 14, 2012 | Kitt Peak | Spacewatch | · | 1.3 km | MPC · JPL |
| 635700 | 2014 BW_{44} | — | January 4, 2003 | Kitt Peak | Spacewatch | · | 3.7 km | MPC · JPL |

== 635701–635800 ==
back to top

| Designation | | | Discovery | | | Properties | | Ref |
| Permanent | Provisional | Named after | Date | Site | Discoverer(s) | Category | Diam. | Ref |
|---|---|---|---|---|---|---|---|---|
| 635701 | 2014 BV_{45} | — | December 2, 2012 | Mount Lemmon | Mount Lemmon Survey | · | 3.4 km | MPC · JPL |
| 635702 | 2014 BG_{50} | — | January 27, 2007 | Kitt Peak | Spacewatch | · | 800 m | MPC · JPL |
| 635703 | 2014 BY_{51} | — | November 12, 2005 | Kitt Peak | Spacewatch | · | 1.3 km | MPC · JPL |
| 635704 | 2014 BA_{67} | — | August 13, 2012 | Kitt Peak | Spacewatch | · | 650 m | MPC · JPL |
| 635705 | 2014 BJ_{78} | — | January 31, 2014 | Haleakala | Pan-STARRS 1 | EOS | 1.6 km | MPC · JPL |
| 635706 | 2014 BV_{81} | — | March 10, 2005 | Mount Lemmon | Mount Lemmon Survey | · | 1.4 km | MPC · JPL |
| 635707 | 2014 BK_{86} | — | January 26, 2014 | Haleakala | Pan-STARRS 1 | · | 2.4 km | MPC · JPL |
| 635708 | 2014 BR_{89} | — | January 25, 2014 | Haleakala | Pan-STARRS 1 | · | 2.4 km | MPC · JPL |
| 635709 | 2014 CU_{3} | — | February 2, 2003 | Palomar | NEAT | NYS | 940 m | MPC · JPL |
| 635710 | 2014 CU_{4} | — | March 26, 2003 | Palomar | NEAT | · | 1.4 km | MPC · JPL |
| 635711 | 2014 CF_{5} | — | March 5, 2002 | Apache Point | SDSS Collaboration | · | 1.4 km | MPC · JPL |
| 635712 | 2014 CV_{5} | — | December 5, 2007 | Kitt Peak | Spacewatch | · | 2.8 km | MPC · JPL |
| 635713 | 2014 CE_{14} | — | March 24, 2001 | Kvistaberg | Uppsala-DLR Asteroid Survey | H | 630 m | MPC · JPL |
| 635714 | 2014 CF_{17} | — | February 24, 2002 | Palomar | NEAT | · | 2.0 km | MPC · JPL |
| 635715 | 2014 CK_{17} | — | February 9, 2014 | Mount Lemmon | Mount Lemmon Survey | · | 3.0 km | MPC · JPL |
| 635716 | 2014 CF_{18} | — | February 9, 2003 | Kitt Peak | Spacewatch | MAS | 640 m | MPC · JPL |
| 635717 | 2014 CO_{18} | — | January 2, 2014 | Mount Lemmon | Mount Lemmon Survey | TIR | 2.5 km | MPC · JPL |
| 635718 | 2014 CM_{19} | — | December 16, 2007 | Kitt Peak | Spacewatch | · | 2.5 km | MPC · JPL |
| 635719 | 2014 CH_{27} | — | October 31, 2011 | Mayhill | L. Elenin | · | 1.6 km | MPC · JPL |
| 635720 | 2014 CC_{31} | — | February 6, 2014 | Mount Lemmon | Mount Lemmon Survey | · | 1.8 km | MPC · JPL |
| 635721 | 2014 CL_{33} | — | February 10, 2014 | Haleakala | Pan-STARRS 1 | · | 2.5 km | MPC · JPL |
| 635722 | 2014 DX | — | August 25, 2005 | Palomar | NEAT | · | 3.1 km | MPC · JPL |
| 635723 | 2014 DR_{3} | — | January 7, 2006 | Mount Lemmon | Mount Lemmon Survey | · | 1.4 km | MPC · JPL |
| 635724 | 2014 DS_{3} | — | September 18, 2006 | Kitt Peak | Spacewatch | · | 2.4 km | MPC · JPL |
| 635725 | 2014 DU_{3} | — | February 12, 2000 | Apache Point | SDSS Collaboration | NYS | 870 m | MPC · JPL |
| 635726 | 2014 DY_{3} | — | October 30, 2007 | Mount Lemmon | Mount Lemmon Survey | KOR | 1.3 km | MPC · JPL |
| 635727 | 2014 DB_{7} | — | December 18, 2009 | Mount Lemmon | Mount Lemmon Survey | NYS | 1.1 km | MPC · JPL |
| 635728 | 2014 DD_{7} | — | September 23, 2011 | Haleakala | Pan-STARRS 1 | · | 3.6 km | MPC · JPL |
| 635729 | 2014 DW_{13} | — | March 23, 2003 | Apache Point | SDSS Collaboration | · | 3.4 km | MPC · JPL |
| 635730 | 2014 DO_{18} | — | February 13, 2010 | Mount Lemmon | Mount Lemmon Survey | MAS | 610 m | MPC · JPL |
| 635731 | 2014 DV_{20} | — | January 18, 2006 | Palomar | NEAT | H | 620 m | MPC · JPL |
| 635732 | 2014 DS_{23} | — | January 1, 2003 | Kitt Peak | Spacewatch | · | 990 m | MPC · JPL |
| 635733 | 2014 DX_{23} | — | August 9, 2000 | Kitt Peak | Spacewatch | · | 1.6 km | MPC · JPL |
| 635734 | 2014 DK_{30} | — | September 25, 2001 | Socorro | LINEAR | EOS | 2.3 km | MPC · JPL |
| 635735 | 2014 DK_{33} | — | February 21, 2014 | Kitt Peak | Spacewatch | · | 1.1 km | MPC · JPL |
| 635736 | 2014 DU_{34} | — | January 23, 2014 | Mount Lemmon | Mount Lemmon Survey | · | 2.2 km | MPC · JPL |
| 635737 | 2014 DW_{34} | — | November 20, 2003 | Kitt Peak | Spacewatch | · | 1.7 km | MPC · JPL |
| 635738 | 2014 DH_{37} | — | September 22, 2012 | Mount Lemmon | Mount Lemmon Survey | V | 640 m | MPC · JPL |
| 635739 | 2014 DE_{38} | — | December 18, 2009 | Kitt Peak | Spacewatch | MAS | 670 m | MPC · JPL |
| 635740 | 2014 DJ_{41} | — | February 24, 2014 | Haleakala | Pan-STARRS 1 | · | 2.0 km | MPC · JPL |
| 635741 | 2014 DA_{42} | — | January 5, 2013 | Mount Lemmon | Mount Lemmon Survey | L4 | 8.0 km | MPC · JPL |
| 635742 | 2014 DB_{43} | — | July 28, 2011 | Haleakala | Pan-STARRS 1 | · | 2.9 km | MPC · JPL |
| 635743 | 2014 DV_{52} | — | January 16, 2004 | Kitt Peak | Spacewatch | AGN | 1.4 km | MPC · JPL |
| 635744 | 2014 DO_{53} | — | March 3, 2005 | Kitt Peak | Spacewatch | · | 1.7 km | MPC · JPL |
| 635745 | 2014 DS_{59} | — | April 1, 2003 | Apache Point | SDSS Collaboration | · | 2.5 km | MPC · JPL |
| 635746 | 2014 DY_{59} | — | March 19, 2010 | Mount Lemmon | Mount Lemmon Survey | · | 1.0 km | MPC · JPL |
| 635747 | 2014 DJ_{60} | — | April 19, 2007 | Mount Lemmon | Mount Lemmon Survey | · | 1.0 km | MPC · JPL |
| 635748 | 2014 DO_{61} | — | November 21, 2007 | Mount Lemmon | Mount Lemmon Survey | · | 1.9 km | MPC · JPL |
| 635749 | 2014 DU_{61} | — | March 10, 2005 | Mount Lemmon | Mount Lemmon Survey | · | 1.7 km | MPC · JPL |
| 635750 | 2014 DT_{73} | — | February 26, 2014 | Haleakala | Pan-STARRS 1 | · | 1.4 km | MPC · JPL |
| 635751 | 2014 DH_{77} | — | February 28, 2008 | Mount Lemmon | Mount Lemmon Survey | · | 3.4 km | MPC · JPL |
| 635752 | 2014 DM_{77} | — | October 15, 2002 | Palomar | NEAT | GEF | 1.8 km | MPC · JPL |
| 635753 | 2014 DR_{77} | — | March 26, 2003 | Campo Imperatore | CINEOS | NYS | 960 m | MPC · JPL |
| 635754 | 2014 DP_{78} | — | May 6, 2006 | Mount Lemmon | Mount Lemmon Survey | · | 1.7 km | MPC · JPL |
| 635755 | 2014 DW_{84} | — | November 28, 2008 | Piszkéstető | K. Sárneczky, Á. Kárpáti | · | 1.2 km | MPC · JPL |
| 635756 | 2014 DH_{97} | — | April 2, 2002 | Palomar | NEAT | fast | 1.4 km | MPC · JPL |
| 635757 | 2014 DN_{98} | — | October 7, 2012 | Haleakala | Pan-STARRS 1 | EUN | 1.0 km | MPC · JPL |
| 635758 | 2014 DJ_{102} | — | February 27, 2014 | Mount Lemmon | Mount Lemmon Survey | NYS | 860 m | MPC · JPL |
| 635759 | 2014 DZ_{102} | — | February 26, 2007 | Mount Lemmon | Mount Lemmon Survey | · | 1.1 km | MPC · JPL |
| 635760 | 2014 DS_{104} | — | June 12, 2011 | Mount Lemmon | Mount Lemmon Survey | · | 1.4 km | MPC · JPL |
| 635761 | 2014 DK_{111} | — | March 18, 2010 | Mount Lemmon | Mount Lemmon Survey | · | 1.2 km | MPC · JPL |
| 635762 | 2014 DK_{113} | — | February 2, 2008 | Mount Lemmon | Mount Lemmon Survey | · | 2.6 km | MPC · JPL |
| 635763 | 2014 DV_{113} | — | February 17, 2007 | Mount Lemmon | Mount Lemmon Survey | · | 1.0 km | MPC · JPL |
| 635764 | 2014 DB_{114} | — | February 20, 2014 | Mount Lemmon | Mount Lemmon Survey | · | 2.8 km | MPC · JPL |
| 635765 | 2014 DG_{115} | — | September 6, 2008 | Mount Lemmon | Mount Lemmon Survey | · | 930 m | MPC · JPL |
| 635766 | 2014 DG_{120} | — | October 24, 2001 | Palomar | NEAT | NYS | 1.2 km | MPC · JPL |
| 635767 | 2014 DQ_{121} | — | January 11, 2008 | Kitt Peak | Spacewatch | HYG | 2.1 km | MPC · JPL |
| 635768 | 2014 DV_{121} | — | September 10, 2007 | Kitt Peak | Spacewatch | · | 1.2 km | MPC · JPL |
| 635769 | 2014 DK_{123} | — | October 11, 2010 | Mount Lemmon | Mount Lemmon Survey | L4 | 6.7 km | MPC · JPL |
| 635770 | 2014 DL_{124} | — | December 7, 2008 | Mount Lemmon | Mount Lemmon Survey | · | 1.6 km | MPC · JPL |
| 635771 Prahácsmargit | 2014 DM_{129} | Prahácsmargit | October 23, 2012 | Piszkéstető | K. Sárneczky, A. Király | (5) | 1.3 km | MPC · JPL |
| 635772 | 2014 DS_{132} | — | October 6, 2007 | Kitt Peak | Spacewatch | HOF | 2.3 km | MPC · JPL |
| 635773 | 2014 DK_{134} | — | April 29, 2003 | Haleakala | NEAT | · | 1.4 km | MPC · JPL |
| 635774 | 2014 DY_{135} | — | February 9, 2014 | Haleakala | Pan-STARRS 1 | · | 1.1 km | MPC · JPL |
| 635775 | 2014 DM_{141} | — | March 3, 2009 | Catalina | CSS | NAE | 3.4 km | MPC · JPL |
| 635776 | 2014 DU_{141} | — | February 1, 2003 | Palomar | NEAT | · | 3.5 km | MPC · JPL |
| 635777 | 2014 DB_{146} | — | September 13, 2002 | Palomar | NEAT | · | 2.1 km | MPC · JPL |
| 635778 | 2014 DJ_{149} | — | March 13, 2003 | Kitt Peak | Spacewatch | · | 2.4 km | MPC · JPL |
| 635779 | 2014 DV_{152} | — | March 14, 2007 | Kitt Peak | Spacewatch | · | 870 m | MPC · JPL |
| 635780 | 2014 DF_{156} | — | May 1, 2003 | Kitt Peak | Spacewatch | MAS | 690 m | MPC · JPL |
| 635781 | 2014 DP_{168} | — | February 20, 2014 | Haleakala | Pan-STARRS 1 | · | 2.5 km | MPC · JPL |
| 635782 | 2014 DW_{168} | — | February 24, 2014 | Haleakala | Pan-STARRS 1 | VER | 1.9 km | MPC · JPL |
| 635783 | 2014 DZ_{168} | — | February 26, 2014 | Haleakala | Pan-STARRS 1 | · | 1.7 km | MPC · JPL |
| 635784 | 2014 DC_{169} | — | February 27, 2014 | Mount Lemmon | Mount Lemmon Survey | · | 1.7 km | MPC · JPL |
| 635785 | 2014 DK_{176} | — | February 28, 2014 | Haleakala | Pan-STARRS 1 | · | 2.2 km | MPC · JPL |
| 635786 | 2014 DY_{194} | — | February 19, 2014 | Mount Lemmon | Mount Lemmon Survey | · | 2.5 km | MPC · JPL |
| 635787 | 2014 EP_{3} | — | December 18, 2004 | Mount Lemmon | Mount Lemmon Survey | · | 1.4 km | MPC · JPL |
| 635788 | 2014 EY_{5} | — | September 24, 1995 | Kitt Peak | Spacewatch | · | 2.5 km | MPC · JPL |
| 635789 | 2014 EE_{10} | — | March 9, 2003 | Kitt Peak | Spacewatch | MAS | 670 m | MPC · JPL |
| 635790 | 2014 EC_{12} | — | April 30, 2009 | Kitt Peak | Spacewatch | · | 2.3 km | MPC · JPL |
| 635791 | 2014 EY_{13} | — | February 2, 2008 | Kitt Peak | Spacewatch | · | 2.7 km | MPC · JPL |
| 635792 | 2014 EU_{14} | — | February 9, 2014 | Kitt Peak | Spacewatch | · | 2.3 km | MPC · JPL |
| 635793 | 2014 EA_{15} | — | March 5, 2014 | Haleakala | Pan-STARRS 1 | · | 1.1 km | MPC · JPL |
| 635794 | 2014 EM_{16} | — | September 16, 2009 | Kitt Peak | Spacewatch | L4 | 8.1 km | MPC · JPL |
| 635795 | 2014 EK_{18} | — | September 15, 2012 | Catalina | CSS | V | 680 m | MPC · JPL |
| 635796 | 2014 EN_{26} | — | February 26, 2014 | Haleakala | Pan-STARRS 1 | NYS | 1.3 km | MPC · JPL |
| 635797 | 2014 EM_{28} | — | December 24, 2005 | Kitt Peak | Spacewatch | · | 1.1 km | MPC · JPL |
| 635798 | 2014 EW_{28} | — | October 26, 2006 | Lulin | LUSS | VER | 3.2 km | MPC · JPL |
| 635799 | 2014 EK_{29} | — | March 12, 2002 | Kitt Peak | Spacewatch | · | 1.4 km | MPC · JPL |
| 635800 | 2014 EJ_{30} | — | December 10, 2002 | Palomar | NEAT | · | 2.9 km | MPC · JPL |

== 635801–635900 ==
back to top

| Designation | | | Discovery | | | Properties | | Ref |
| Permanent | Provisional | Named after | Date | Site | Discoverer(s) | Category | Diam. | Ref |
|---|---|---|---|---|---|---|---|---|
| 635801 | 2014 EU_{30} | — | October 17, 2012 | Haleakala | Pan-STARRS 1 | · | 1.0 km | MPC · JPL |
| 635802 | 2014 EF_{34} | — | September 26, 2012 | Mount Lemmon | Mount Lemmon Survey | · | 1.1 km | MPC · JPL |
| 635803 | 2014 EO_{34} | — | December 10, 2009 | Mount Lemmon | Mount Lemmon Survey | · | 850 m | MPC · JPL |
| 635804 | 2014 ER_{34} | — | March 8, 2005 | Mount Lemmon | Mount Lemmon Survey | MAR | 1.2 km | MPC · JPL |
| 635805 | 2014 EV_{34} | — | March 8, 2014 | Mount Lemmon | Mount Lemmon Survey | · | 2.8 km | MPC · JPL |
| 635806 | 2014 EN_{35} | — | November 2, 2008 | Mount Lemmon | Mount Lemmon Survey | · | 1.2 km | MPC · JPL |
| 635807 | 2014 EA_{37} | — | October 20, 2012 | Haleakala | Pan-STARRS 1 | · | 2.5 km | MPC · JPL |
| 635808 | 2014 EU_{38} | — | January 8, 2010 | Mount Lemmon | Mount Lemmon Survey | V | 640 m | MPC · JPL |
| 635809 | 2014 EF_{41} | — | November 26, 2012 | Mount Lemmon | Mount Lemmon Survey | · | 1.5 km | MPC · JPL |
| 635810 | 2014 EU_{41} | — | November 23, 2006 | Mount Lemmon | Mount Lemmon Survey | VER | 2.4 km | MPC · JPL |
| 635811 | 2014 EZ_{41} | — | September 25, 2011 | Haleakala | Pan-STARRS 1 | VER | 2.3 km | MPC · JPL |
| 635812 | 2014 EY_{42} | — | April 9, 2003 | Palomar | NEAT | NYS | 1.4 km | MPC · JPL |
| 635813 | 2014 ER_{44} | — | October 23, 2003 | Apache Point | SDSS | · | 1.8 km | MPC · JPL |
| 635814 | 2014 EH_{50} | — | January 30, 2003 | Palomar | NEAT | · | 2.9 km | MPC · JPL |
| 635815 | 2014 EL_{50} | — | March 23, 2003 | Kitt Peak | Spacewatch | NYS | 1.2 km | MPC · JPL |
| 635816 | 2014 EN_{50} | — | January 16, 2005 | Kitt Peak | Spacewatch | MAR | 1.7 km | MPC · JPL |
| 635817 Alexanderkann | 2014 ER_{52} | Alexanderkann | December 15, 2006 | Karl Schwarzschild | Kann, D. A. | · | 2.6 km | MPC · JPL |
| 635818 | 2014 EQ_{55} | — | November 10, 2010 | Mount Lemmon | Mount Lemmon Survey | L4 | 6.8 km | MPC · JPL |
| 635819 | 2014 EQ_{56} | — | October 8, 2008 | Mount Lemmon | Mount Lemmon Survey | · | 1.1 km | MPC · JPL |
| 635820 | 2014 EZ_{60} | — | October 22, 2012 | Haleakala | Pan-STARRS 1 | EOS | 1.4 km | MPC · JPL |
| 635821 | 2014 EJ_{63} | — | June 11, 2015 | Haleakala | Pan-STARRS 1 | · | 2.5 km | MPC · JPL |
| 635822 | 2014 EX_{69} | — | August 24, 2008 | Kitt Peak | Spacewatch | L4 | 7.4 km | MPC · JPL |
| 635823 | 2014 EP_{71} | — | February 10, 2008 | Kitt Peak | Spacewatch | · | 3.5 km | MPC · JPL |
| 635824 | 2014 EW_{73} | — | December 18, 2009 | Kitt Peak | Spacewatch | · | 1.1 km | MPC · JPL |
| 635825 | 2014 EO_{74} | — | January 18, 2013 | Haleakala | Pan-STARRS 1 | L4 | 7.3 km | MPC · JPL |
| 635826 | 2014 ES_{95} | — | September 7, 2008 | Mount Lemmon | Mount Lemmon Survey | L4 | 6.8 km | MPC · JPL |
| 635827 | 2014 EH_{96} | — | October 22, 2005 | Kitt Peak | Spacewatch | · | 920 m | MPC · JPL |
| 635828 | 2014 EJ_{103} | — | October 18, 2012 | Haleakala | Pan-STARRS 1 | · | 1.0 km | MPC · JPL |
| 635829 | 2014 EP_{103} | — | October 3, 2011 | Les Engarouines | L. Bernasconi | · | 3.2 km | MPC · JPL |
| 635830 | 2014 EF_{109} | — | November 22, 2012 | Kitt Peak | Spacewatch | · | 2.9 km | MPC · JPL |
| 635831 | 2014 EK_{112} | — | September 20, 2006 | Catalina | CSS | · | 2.7 km | MPC · JPL |
| 635832 | 2014 ER_{125} | — | October 22, 2012 | Haleakala | Pan-STARRS 1 | EOS | 1.5 km | MPC · JPL |
| 635833 | 2014 EN_{127} | — | October 19, 2006 | Catalina | CSS | · | 2.2 km | MPC · JPL |
| 635834 | 2014 EO_{128} | — | April 24, 2015 | Haleakala | Pan-STARRS 1 | · | 2.7 km | MPC · JPL |
| 635835 | 2014 EP_{143} | — | May 20, 2015 | Cerro Tololo | DECam | · | 2.1 km | MPC · JPL |
| 635836 | 2014 EP_{148} | — | February 28, 2014 | Haleakala | Pan-STARRS 1 | L4 | 6.1 km | MPC · JPL |
| 635837 | 2014 EO_{160} | — | January 10, 2008 | Mount Lemmon | Mount Lemmon Survey | VER | 2.2 km | MPC · JPL |
| 635838 | 2014 ES_{176} | — | August 29, 2016 | Mount Lemmon | Mount Lemmon Survey | EOS | 1.4 km | MPC · JPL |
| 635839 | 2014 EO_{182} | — | July 22, 2006 | Mount Lemmon | Mount Lemmon Survey | · | 3.1 km | MPC · JPL |
| 635840 | 2014 EC_{187} | — | September 18, 2011 | Mount Lemmon | Mount Lemmon Survey | · | 2.6 km | MPC · JPL |
| 635841 | 2014 EE_{198} | — | February 28, 2014 | Haleakala | Pan-STARRS 1 | · | 3.2 km | MPC · JPL |
| 635842 | 2014 EY_{215} | — | February 26, 2014 | Haleakala | Pan-STARRS 1 | · | 2.3 km | MPC · JPL |
| 635843 | 2014 EH_{223} | — | January 10, 2008 | Mount Lemmon | Mount Lemmon Survey | · | 2.6 km | MPC · JPL |
| 635844 | 2014 EW_{224} | — | October 28, 2005 | Mount Lemmon | Mount Lemmon Survey | · | 810 m | MPC · JPL |
| 635845 | 2014 ED_{226} | — | February 9, 2003 | Kitt Peak | Spacewatch | · | 2.3 km | MPC · JPL |
| 635846 | 2014 EN_{243} | — | October 30, 2010 | Mount Lemmon | Mount Lemmon Survey | L4 | 7.5 km | MPC · JPL |
| 635847 | 2014 EV_{244} | — | September 30, 1991 | Kitt Peak | Spacewatch | · | 1.5 km | MPC · JPL |
| 635848 | 2014 EV_{247} | — | January 8, 2006 | Kitt Peak | Spacewatch | · | 1.3 km | MPC · JPL |
| 635849 | 2014 EL_{258} | — | March 10, 2014 | Mount Lemmon | Mount Lemmon Survey | · | 1.2 km | MPC · JPL |
| 635850 | 2014 FN_{6} | — | February 9, 2008 | Mount Lemmon | Mount Lemmon Survey | · | 2.4 km | MPC · JPL |
| 635851 | 2014 FM_{8} | — | September 11, 2001 | Kitt Peak | Spacewatch | · | 970 m | MPC · JPL |
| 635852 | 2014 FJ_{9} | — | March 20, 2001 | Kitt Peak | Spacewatch | · | 1.5 km | MPC · JPL |
| 635853 | 2014 FO_{9} | — | April 16, 2001 | Kitt Peak | Spacewatch | · | 1.6 km | MPC · JPL |
| 635854 | 2014 FQ_{9} | — | October 19, 2011 | Mount Lemmon | Mount Lemmon Survey | · | 2.5 km | MPC · JPL |
| 635855 | 2014 FJ_{11} | — | September 18, 2003 | Kitt Peak | Spacewatch | · | 1.5 km | MPC · JPL |
| 635856 | 2014 FF_{12} | — | January 13, 2008 | Kitt Peak | Spacewatch | · | 2.7 km | MPC · JPL |
| 635857 | 2014 FJ_{12} | — | March 20, 2014 | Mount Lemmon | Mount Lemmon Survey | · | 1.6 km | MPC · JPL |
| 635858 | 2014 FS_{14} | — | April 8, 2003 | Kitt Peak | Spacewatch | · | 920 m | MPC · JPL |
| 635859 | 2014 FC_{20} | — | October 23, 2012 | Haleakala | Pan-STARRS 1 | V | 630 m | MPC · JPL |
| 635860 | 2014 FZ_{25} | — | May 17, 2009 | Kitt Peak | Spacewatch | · | 2.8 km | MPC · JPL |
| 635861 | 2014 FN_{26} | — | February 28, 2014 | Haleakala | Pan-STARRS 1 | VER | 2.3 km | MPC · JPL |
| 635862 | 2014 FG_{31} | — | December 27, 2006 | Mount Lemmon | Mount Lemmon Survey | · | 2.2 km | MPC · JPL |
| 635863 | 2014 FD_{33} | — | September 8, 2004 | Palomar | NEAT | · | 1.9 km | MPC · JPL |
| 635864 | 2014 FD_{37} | — | September 12, 2001 | Kitt Peak | Deep Ecliptic Survey | · | 1.9 km | MPC · JPL |
| 635865 | 2014 FY_{38} | — | April 5, 2003 | Kitt Peak | Spacewatch | · | 2.5 km | MPC · JPL |
| 635866 | 2014 FQ_{39} | — | May 7, 2002 | Kitt Peak | Spacewatch | · | 1.4 km | MPC · JPL |
| 635867 | 2014 FN_{41} | — | June 4, 2006 | Mount Lemmon | Mount Lemmon Survey | · | 1.8 km | MPC · JPL |
| 635868 | 2014 FJ_{44} | — | September 18, 2003 | Palomar | NEAT | · | 1.7 km | MPC · JPL |
| 635869 | 2014 FX_{45} | — | October 12, 2006 | Palomar | NEAT | · | 2.6 km | MPC · JPL |
| 635870 | 2014 FV_{50} | — | February 10, 2014 | Haleakala | Pan-STARRS 1 | · | 1.0 km | MPC · JPL |
| 635871 | 2014 FB_{52} | — | March 20, 2002 | Kitt Peak | Spacewatch | · | 910 m | MPC · JPL |
| 635872 | 2014 FG_{53} | — | May 23, 2002 | Palomar | NEAT | EUN | 1.7 km | MPC · JPL |
| 635873 | 2014 FE_{54} | — | August 24, 2011 | Haleakala | Pan-STARRS 1 | · | 1.2 km | MPC · JPL |
| 635874 | 2014 FT_{54} | — | October 3, 2008 | Mount Lemmon | Mount Lemmon Survey | · | 1.3 km | MPC · JPL |
| 635875 | 2014 FY_{55} | — | March 7, 2008 | Kitt Peak | Spacewatch | · | 3.2 km | MPC · JPL |
| 635876 | 2014 FC_{56} | — | October 7, 2002 | Haleakala | NEAT | · | 3.2 km | MPC · JPL |
| 635877 | 2014 FH_{58} | — | September 12, 2007 | Mount Lemmon | Mount Lemmon Survey | GEF | 1.3 km | MPC · JPL |
| 635878 | 2014 FC_{67} | — | June 7, 2002 | Haleakala | NEAT | · | 1.9 km | MPC · JPL |
| 635879 | 2014 FG_{67} | — | June 5, 2003 | Nogales | P. R. Holvorcem, M. Schwartz | · | 3.5 km | MPC · JPL |
| 635880 | 2014 FN_{74} | — | March 29, 2014 | Mount Lemmon | Mount Lemmon Survey | · | 1.4 km | MPC · JPL |
| 635881 | 2014 GC | — | May 8, 2006 | Kitt Peak | Spacewatch | · | 1.3 km | MPC · JPL |
| 635882 | 2014 GM | — | September 29, 2008 | Kitt Peak | Spacewatch | · | 930 m | MPC · JPL |
| 635883 | 2014 GC_{3} | — | August 29, 2006 | Kitt Peak | Spacewatch | NAE | 2.1 km | MPC · JPL |
| 635884 | 2014 GB_{5} | — | October 22, 2003 | Apache Point | SDSS Collaboration | · | 1.3 km | MPC · JPL |
| 635885 | 2014 GH_{8} | — | June 4, 2005 | Kitt Peak | Spacewatch | (18466) | 2.4 km | MPC · JPL |
| 635886 | 2014 GM_{8} | — | March 11, 2014 | Kitt Peak | Spacewatch | NYS | 1.2 km | MPC · JPL |
| 635887 | 2014 GL_{9} | — | October 23, 2009 | Mount Lemmon | Mount Lemmon Survey | L4 | 7.4 km | MPC · JPL |
| 635888 | 2014 GF_{11} | — | March 4, 2006 | Kitt Peak | Spacewatch | PHO | 910 m | MPC · JPL |
| 635889 | 2014 GN_{17} | — | May 19, 2006 | Reedy Creek | J. Broughton | · | 1.9 km | MPC · JPL |
| 635890 | 2014 GQ_{23} | — | April 4, 2014 | Mount Lemmon | Mount Lemmon Survey | · | 2.7 km | MPC · JPL |
| 635891 | 2014 GD_{24} | — | December 30, 2005 | Mount Lemmon | Mount Lemmon Survey | V | 680 m | MPC · JPL |
| 635892 | 2014 GO_{25} | — | March 9, 2008 | Mount Lemmon | Mount Lemmon Survey | · | 4.0 km | MPC · JPL |
| 635893 | 2014 GD_{30} | — | April 4, 2014 | Haleakala | Pan-STARRS 1 | · | 950 m | MPC · JPL |
| 635894 | 2014 GK_{32} | — | October 25, 2001 | Apache Point | SDSS Collaboration | · | 2.1 km | MPC · JPL |
| 635895 | 2014 GP_{40} | — | May 27, 2003 | Anderson Mesa | LONEOS | · | 5.3 km | MPC · JPL |
| 635896 | 2014 GC_{48} | — | April 7, 2014 | Mount Lemmon | Mount Lemmon Survey | L4 | 9.6 km | MPC · JPL |
| 635897 | 2014 GM_{48} | — | November 13, 2006 | Catalina | CSS | · | 4.1 km | MPC · JPL |
| 635898 | 2014 GM_{50} | — | February 7, 2008 | Kitt Peak | Spacewatch | EOS | 2.0 km | MPC · JPL |
| 635899 | 2014 GO_{57} | — | July 21, 2006 | Mount Lemmon | Mount Lemmon Survey | · | 1.3 km | MPC · JPL |
| 635900 | 2014 GB_{64} | — | April 6, 2014 | Kitt Peak | Spacewatch | · | 970 m | MPC · JPL |

== 635901–636000 ==
back to top

| Designation | | | Discovery | | | Properties | | Ref |
| Permanent | Provisional | Named after | Date | Site | Discoverer(s) | Category | Diam. | Ref |
|---|---|---|---|---|---|---|---|---|
| 635901 | 2014 GF_{64} | — | April 8, 2014 | Kitt Peak | Spacewatch | · | 1.2 km | MPC · JPL |
| 635902 | 2014 HS | — | May 1, 2001 | Palomar | NEAT | · | 1.9 km | MPC · JPL |
| 635903 | 2014 HA_{1} | — | October 8, 2002 | Palomar | NEAT | · | 2.0 km | MPC · JPL |
| 635904 | 2014 HQ_{1} | — | September 3, 2002 | Palomar | NEAT | · | 1.9 km | MPC · JPL |
| 635905 | 2014 HK_{3} | — | June 16, 2010 | Nogales | M. Schwartz, P. R. Holvorcem | · | 1.7 km | MPC · JPL |
| 635906 | 2014 HY_{8} | — | August 27, 2011 | Haleakala | Pan-STARRS 1 | · | 910 m | MPC · JPL |
| 635907 | 2014 HV_{20} | — | September 12, 2007 | Mount Lemmon | Mount Lemmon Survey | · | 990 m | MPC · JPL |
| 635908 | 2014 HU_{25} | — | August 25, 2003 | Cerro Tololo | Deep Ecliptic Survey | · | 770 m | MPC · JPL |
| 635909 | 2014 HN_{29} | — | October 2, 2005 | Mount Lemmon | Mount Lemmon Survey | · | 2.6 km | MPC · JPL |
| 635910 | 2014 HR_{29} | — | November 7, 2008 | Mount Lemmon | Mount Lemmon Survey | · | 1.1 km | MPC · JPL |
| 635911 | 2014 HJ_{39} | — | December 24, 2005 | Kitt Peak | Spacewatch | · | 1.0 km | MPC · JPL |
| 635912 | 2014 HN_{67} | — | January 13, 2013 | Mount Lemmon | Mount Lemmon Survey | · | 870 m | MPC · JPL |
| 635913 | 2014 HJ_{88} | — | June 18, 2006 | Kitt Peak | Spacewatch | · | 1.8 km | MPC · JPL |
| 635914 | 2014 HX_{92} | — | October 12, 2007 | Mount Lemmon | Mount Lemmon Survey | · | 1.8 km | MPC · JPL |
| 635915 | 2014 HH_{97} | — | April 24, 2014 | Mount Lemmon | Mount Lemmon Survey | · | 2.3 km | MPC · JPL |
| 635916 | 2014 HR_{98} | — | April 23, 2014 | Cerro Tololo-DECam | DECam | · | 2.7 km | MPC · JPL |
| 635917 | 2014 HZ_{109} | — | March 8, 2008 | Mount Lemmon | Mount Lemmon Survey | · | 2.3 km | MPC · JPL |
| 635918 | 2014 HN_{111} | — | January 20, 2013 | Mount Lemmon | Mount Lemmon Survey | · | 2.3 km | MPC · JPL |
| 635919 | 2014 HP_{119} | — | April 23, 2014 | Cerro Tololo-DECam | DECam | · | 860 m | MPC · JPL |
| 635920 | 2014 HF_{127} | — | January 16, 2004 | Kitt Peak | Spacewatch | · | 2.0 km | MPC · JPL |
| 635921 | 2014 HQ_{127} | — | January 18, 2004 | Kitt Peak | Spacewatch | · | 1.9 km | MPC · JPL |
| 635922 | 2014 HQ_{129} | — | May 12, 2005 | Palomar | NEAT | · | 2.2 km | MPC · JPL |
| 635923 | 2014 HA_{131} | — | February 28, 2014 | Haleakala | Pan-STARRS 1 | MAS | 620 m | MPC · JPL |
| 635924 | 2014 HJ_{142} | — | February 1, 2005 | Catalina | CSS | · | 1.4 km | MPC · JPL |
| 635925 | 2014 HY_{143} | — | September 3, 2008 | Kitt Peak | Spacewatch | L4 | 8.6 km | MPC · JPL |
| 635926 | 2014 HC_{154} | — | April 23, 2014 | Cerro Tololo-DECam | DECam | · | 760 m | MPC · JPL |
| 635927 | 2014 HF_{155} | — | March 18, 2010 | Kitt Peak | Spacewatch | NYS | 1.4 km | MPC · JPL |
| 635928 | 2014 HX_{158} | — | November 17, 2011 | Mayhill-ISON | L. Elenin | · | 3.3 km | MPC · JPL |
| 635929 | 2014 HT_{160} | — | October 20, 2011 | Mount Lemmon | Mount Lemmon Survey | · | 2.6 km | MPC · JPL |
| 635930 | 2014 HV_{161} | — | July 31, 2006 | Siding Spring | SSS | · | 2.0 km | MPC · JPL |
| 635931 | 2014 HC_{162} | — | March 24, 2006 | Mount Lemmon | Mount Lemmon Survey | · | 790 m | MPC · JPL |
| 635932 | 2014 HM_{165} | — | April 23, 2014 | Mount Lemmon | Mount Lemmon Survey | · | 1.3 km | MPC · JPL |
| 635933 | 2014 HP_{167} | — | September 7, 2004 | Socorro | LINEAR | LIX | 4.6 km | MPC · JPL |
| 635934 | 2014 HW_{171} | — | February 22, 2001 | Haleakala | NEAT | · | 1.4 km | MPC · JPL |
| 635935 | 2014 HM_{176} | — | December 22, 2008 | Kitt Peak | Spacewatch | · | 1.0 km | MPC · JPL |
| 635936 | 2014 HZ_{181} | — | March 23, 2003 | Apache Point | SDSS Collaboration | · | 2.5 km | MPC · JPL |
| 635937 | 2014 HC_{182} | — | May 1, 2003 | Kitt Peak | Spacewatch | · | 2.7 km | MPC · JPL |
| 635938 | 2014 HG_{193} | — | December 1, 2005 | Kitt Peak | Spacewatch | · | 760 m | MPC · JPL |
| 635939 | 2014 HW_{194} | — | September 4, 2011 | Haleakala | Pan-STARRS 1 | · | 1.5 km | MPC · JPL |
| 635940 | 2014 HC_{195} | — | April 30, 2014 | Haleakala | Pan-STARRS 1 | RAF | 990 m | MPC · JPL |
| 635941 | 2014 HC_{203} | — | October 20, 2003 | Kitt Peak | Spacewatch | · | 960 m | MPC · JPL |
| 635942 | 2014 HE_{204} | — | April 29, 2014 | Haleakala | Pan-STARRS 1 | · | 1.5 km | MPC · JPL |
| 635943 | 2014 HG_{204} | — | December 31, 2008 | Kitt Peak | Spacewatch | · | 980 m | MPC · JPL |
| 635944 | 2014 HU_{207} | — | September 12, 2001 | Kitt Peak | Deep Ecliptic Survey | KOR | 1.1 km | MPC · JPL |
| 635945 | 2014 HU_{228} | — | April 24, 2014 | Mount Lemmon | Mount Lemmon Survey | · | 960 m | MPC · JPL |
| 635946 | 2014 HH_{265} | — | April 24, 2014 | Cerro Tololo-DECam | DECam | · | 780 m | MPC · JPL |
| 635947 | 2014 JA_{9} | — | September 27, 2003 | Apache Point | SDSS Collaboration | MAR | 920 m | MPC · JPL |
| 635948 | 2014 JK_{9} | — | December 31, 2007 | Mount Lemmon | Mount Lemmon Survey | · | 1.7 km | MPC · JPL |
| 635949 | 2014 JX_{9} | — | July 4, 2002 | Kitt Peak | Spacewatch | · | 1.4 km | MPC · JPL |
| 635950 | 2014 JB_{12} | — | February 28, 2014 | Haleakala | Pan-STARRS 1 | · | 2.9 km | MPC · JPL |
| 635951 | 2014 JJ_{16} | — | April 3, 2005 | Palomar | NEAT | · | 2.1 km | MPC · JPL |
| 635952 | 2014 JC_{20} | — | August 1, 2000 | Cerro Tololo | Deep Ecliptic Survey | ERI | 1.4 km | MPC · JPL |
| 635953 | 2014 JN_{24} | — | August 17, 2006 | Palomar | NEAT | · | 1.3 km | MPC · JPL |
| 635954 | 2014 JT_{25} | — | April 22, 2014 | Catalina | CSS | H | 580 m | MPC · JPL |
| 635955 | 2014 JY_{26} | — | March 5, 2002 | Apache Point | SDSS | TIR | 2.6 km | MPC · JPL |
| 635956 | 2014 JH_{39} | — | October 18, 2007 | Kitt Peak | Spacewatch | · | 1.2 km | MPC · JPL |
| 635957 | 2014 JT_{46} | — | August 21, 2006 | Palomar | NEAT | · | 1.5 km | MPC · JPL |
| 635958 | 2014 JG_{58} | — | February 16, 2004 | Kitt Peak | Spacewatch | · | 2.5 km | MPC · JPL |
| 635959 | 2014 JP_{62} | — | August 24, 2011 | Haleakala | Pan-STARRS 1 | · | 900 m | MPC · JPL |
| 635960 | 2014 JE_{66} | — | May 1, 2006 | Kitt Peak | Spacewatch | · | 1.2 km | MPC · JPL |
| 635961 | 2014 JH_{71} | — | April 30, 2014 | Haleakala | Pan-STARRS 1 | MAR | 970 m | MPC · JPL |
| 635962 | 2014 JV_{71} | — | June 4, 2006 | Mount Lemmon | Mount Lemmon Survey | EUN | 730 m | MPC · JPL |
| 635963 | 2014 JE_{75} | — | March 20, 2010 | Kitt Peak | Spacewatch | MAS | 700 m | MPC · JPL |
| 635964 | 2014 JE_{76} | — | September 18, 2003 | Kitt Peak | Spacewatch | · | 1.1 km | MPC · JPL |
| 635965 | 2014 JB_{79} | — | July 19, 2006 | Lulin | LUSS | · | 2.0 km | MPC · JPL |
| 635966 | 2014 JV_{84} | — | September 28, 2006 | Mount Lemmon | Mount Lemmon Survey | · | 2.1 km | MPC · JPL |
| 635967 | 2014 JK_{85} | — | September 18, 2011 | Mount Lemmon | Mount Lemmon Survey | · | 1.0 km | MPC · JPL |
| 635968 | 2014 JM_{85} | — | May 9, 2014 | Haleakala | Pan-STARRS 1 | · | 1.0 km | MPC · JPL |
| 635969 | 2014 JX_{85} | — | August 24, 2011 | Haleakala | Pan-STARRS 1 | · | 1.1 km | MPC · JPL |
| 635970 | 2014 JK_{87} | — | August 31, 2002 | Kitt Peak | Spacewatch | · | 960 m | MPC · JPL |
| 635971 | 2014 JM_{90} | — | May 8, 2014 | Haleakala | Pan-STARRS 1 | · | 810 m | MPC · JPL |
| 635972 | 2014 KM_{3} | — | January 8, 2007 | Mount Lemmon | Mount Lemmon Survey | EOS | 2.3 km | MPC · JPL |
| 635973 | 2014 KL_{5} | — | July 6, 2000 | Anderson Mesa | LONEOS | · | 3.5 km | MPC · JPL |
| 635974 | 2014 KC_{6} | — | September 14, 2006 | Kitt Peak | Spacewatch | KOR | 1.3 km | MPC · JPL |
| 635975 | 2014 KS_{7} | — | September 30, 2003 | Kitt Peak | Spacewatch | · | 1.1 km | MPC · JPL |
| 635976 | 2014 KJ_{9} | — | April 25, 2014 | Mount Lemmon | Mount Lemmon Survey | · | 1.1 km | MPC · JPL |
| 635977 | 2014 KW_{11} | — | October 25, 2005 | Mount Lemmon | Mount Lemmon Survey | (31811) | 2.6 km | MPC · JPL |
| 635978 | 2014 KN_{13} | — | April 13, 2004 | Kitt Peak | Spacewatch | · | 2.1 km | MPC · JPL |
| 635979 | 2014 KR_{16} | — | September 28, 2003 | Anderson Mesa | LONEOS | · | 1.5 km | MPC · JPL |
| 635980 | 2014 KH_{18} | — | September 12, 2007 | Kitt Peak | Spacewatch | · | 1.0 km | MPC · JPL |
| 635981 | 2014 KX_{26} | — | November 7, 2007 | Catalina | CSS | · | 1.4 km | MPC · JPL |
| 635982 | 2014 KD_{31} | — | November 2, 2007 | Mount Lemmon | Mount Lemmon Survey | · | 1.2 km | MPC · JPL |
| 635983 | 2014 KT_{43} | — | October 22, 2005 | Palomar | NEAT | EOS | 2.3 km | MPC · JPL |
| 635984 | 2014 KA_{53} | — | November 8, 2007 | Mount Lemmon | Mount Lemmon Survey | · | 1.1 km | MPC · JPL |
| 635985 | 2014 KN_{53} | — | September 19, 2011 | Haleakala | Pan-STARRS 1 | · | 1.1 km | MPC · JPL |
| 635986 | 2014 KC_{59} | — | May 7, 2014 | Haleakala | Pan-STARRS 1 | · | 1.1 km | MPC · JPL |
| 635987 | 2014 KZ_{59} | — | December 29, 2008 | Kitt Peak | Spacewatch | · | 1.2 km | MPC · JPL |
| 635988 | 2014 KH_{60} | — | May 24, 2014 | Haleakala | Pan-STARRS 1 | · | 1.3 km | MPC · JPL |
| 635989 | 2014 KT_{63} | — | December 31, 2007 | Mount Lemmon | Mount Lemmon Survey | · | 1.9 km | MPC · JPL |
| 635990 | 2014 KP_{64} | — | January 6, 2005 | Catalina | CSS | · | 1.2 km | MPC · JPL |
| 635991 | 2014 KX_{64} | — | October 17, 2010 | Mount Lemmon | Mount Lemmon Survey | VER | 2.5 km | MPC · JPL |
| 635992 | 2014 KR_{72} | — | November 18, 2003 | Kitt Peak | Spacewatch | MAR | 840 m | MPC · JPL |
| 635993 | 2014 KQ_{77} | — | December 20, 2004 | Mount Lemmon | Mount Lemmon Survey | EUN | 1.2 km | MPC · JPL |
| 635994 | 2014 KD_{80} | — | February 11, 2013 | ESA OGS | ESA OGS | · | 1.6 km | MPC · JPL |
| 635995 | 2014 KD_{81} | — | April 7, 2006 | Kitt Peak | Spacewatch | · | 1.1 km | MPC · JPL |
| 635996 | 2014 KA_{82} | — | August 17, 2001 | Palomar | NEAT | · | 1.7 km | MPC · JPL |
| 635997 | 2014 KZ_{84} | — | November 18, 2011 | Mount Lemmon | Mount Lemmon Survey | L4 | 10 km | MPC · JPL |
| 635998 | 2014 KN_{85} | — | May 19, 2014 | Haleakala | Pan-STARRS 1 | · | 1.5 km | MPC · JPL |
| 635999 | 2014 KH_{90} | — | July 5, 2005 | Palomar | NEAT | · | 2.0 km | MPC · JPL |
| 636000 | 2014 KZ_{93} | — | May 28, 2014 | Haleakala | Pan-STARRS 1 | · | 1.3 km | MPC · JPL |

back to top

== Meaning of names ==
As minor planet discoveries are confirmed, they are given a permanent number by the IAU's Minor Planet Center (MPC), and the discoverers can then submit names for them, following the IAU's naming conventions. The list below concerns those minor planets in the specified number-range that have received names, and explains the meanings of those names.

Official naming citations of newly named small Solar System bodies are approved and published in a bulletin by IAU's Working Group for Small Bodies Nomenclature (WGSBN). Before May 2021, citations were published in MPC's Minor Planet Circulars for many decades. Recent citations can also be found on the JPL Small-Body Database (SBDB). Until his death in 2016, German astronomer Lutz D. Schmadel compiled these citations into the Dictionary of Minor Planet Names (DMP) and regularly updated the collection.

Based on Paul Herget's The Names of the Minor Planets, Schmadel also researched the unclear origin of numerous asteroids, most of which had been named prior to World War II. This article incorporates text from this source, which is in the public domain: SBDB New namings may only be added to this list below after official publication as the preannouncement of names is condemned. The WGSBN publishes a comprehensive guideline for the naming rules of non-cometary small Solar System bodies.

| Named minor planet | Provisional | This minor planet was named for... | Ref · Catalog |
|---|---|---|---|
| 635057 Bangailona | 2012 VW_{97} | Ilona Banga (1906–1998), Hungarian biochemist, collaborated with Albert Szent-Györgyi to isolate vitamin C. | IAU · 635057 |
| 635338 Pécsieszter | 2013 GF_{106} | Eszter Pécsi (1898–1975), the first female Hungarian architect and structural engineer | IAU · 635338 |
| 635381 Michaelcoates | 2013 JH_{47} | Michael da Silva Coates (1942–2014), a college friend of the discoverer. | IAU · 635381 |
| 635478 Fotonikalv | 2013 RH_{24} | This object has been named in recognition of the achievements of National Science Platform FOTONIKA-LV at the University of Latvia. | IAU · 635478 |
| 635483 Casimir | 2013 RU_{34} | Casimir Jagiellon, prince of the Kingdom of Poland and of the Grand Duchy of Lithuania. | IAU · 635483 |
| 635771 Prahácsmargit | 2014 DM_{129} | Margit Prahács (1893–1974), Hungarian aesthete and critic. | IAU · 635771 |
| 635817 Alexanderkann | 2014 ER_{52} | David Alexander Kann (1977–2023), German astronomer who worked in the field of γ-ray bursts (GRBs). | IAU · 635817 |
