= List of minor planets: 544001–545000 =

The following is a partial list of minor planets, running from minor-planet number 544001 through 545000, inclusive. The primary data for this and other partial lists is based on JPL's "Small-Body Orbital Elements" and data available from the Minor Planet Center. Critical list information is also provided by the MPC, unless otherwise specified from Lowell Observatory. A detailed description of the table's columns and additional sources are given on the main page including a complete list of every page in this series, and a statistical break-up on the dynamical classification of minor planets.

Also see the summary list of all named bodies in numerical and alphabetical order, and the corresponding naming citations for the number range of this particular list. New namings may only be added to this list after official publication, as the preannouncement of names is condemned by the Working Group for Small Bodies Nomenclature of the International Astronomical Union.

Near-Earth obj.	MBA (inner)	MBA (outer)	Centaur
Mars-crosser	MBA (middle)	Jupiter trojan	Trans-Neptunian obj.
Unclassified

== 544001–544100 ==
Designation			Discovery			Properties		Ref
Permanent	Provisional	Named after	Date	Site	Discoverer(s)	Category	Diam.	Ref
544001	2014 QG_{472}	—	November 6, 2010	Mount Lemmon	Mount Lemmon Survey	·	1.1 km	MPC · JPL
544002	2014 QL_{473}	—	September 13, 2005	Kitt Peak	Spacewatch	·	1.0 km	MPC · JPL
544003	2014 QQ_{474}	—	May 28, 2008	Mount Lemmon	Mount Lemmon Survey	WIT	1.1 km	MPC · JPL
544004	2014 QS_{474}	—	January 19, 2012	Kitt Peak	Spacewatch	·	1.8 km	MPC · JPL
544005	2014 QW_{474}	—	September 13, 2007	Mount Lemmon	Mount Lemmon Survey	·	920 m	MPC · JPL
544006	2014 QQ_{475}	—	September 12, 2010	Mount Lemmon	Mount Lemmon Survey	·	1.4 km	MPC · JPL
544007	2014 QN_{481}	—	August 19, 2006	Kitt Peak	Spacewatch	·	870 m	MPC · JPL
544008	2014 QJ_{483}	—	February 28, 2008	Mount Lemmon	Mount Lemmon Survey	·	690 m	MPC · JPL
544009	2014 QK_{484}	—	July 7, 2014	Haleakala	Pan-STARRS 1	·	1.5 km	MPC · JPL
544010	2014 QT_{487}	—	April 16, 2013	Cerro Tololo	DECam	·	1.0 km	MPC · JPL
544011	2014 QZ_{491}	—	July 17, 2010	WISE	WISE	·	1.9 km	MPC · JPL
544012	2014 QC_{492}	—	March 26, 2003	Palomar	NEAT	·	850 m	MPC · JPL
544013	2014 QB_{493}	—	February 4, 2006	Kitt Peak	Spacewatch	·	890 m	MPC · JPL
544014	2014 QK_{495}	—	August 31, 2014	Haleakala	Pan-STARRS 1	MAR	1.1 km	MPC · JPL
544015	2014 QD_{499}	—	January 12, 1996	Kitt Peak	Spacewatch	·	2.2 km	MPC · JPL
544016	2014 RY_{1}	—	May 12, 2013	Haleakala	Pan-STARRS 1	·	1.8 km	MPC · JPL
544017	2014 RU_{7}	—	August 20, 2014	Haleakala	Pan-STARRS 1	·	1.9 km	MPC · JPL
544018	2014 RK_{9}	—	December 1, 2010	Mount Lemmon	Mount Lemmon Survey	·	1.8 km	MPC · JPL
544019	2014 RQ_{12}	—	January 11, 2003	Kitt Peak	Spacewatch	·	1.7 km	MPC · JPL
544020	2014 RF_{13}	—	June 26, 2014	Mount Lemmon	Mount Lemmon Survey	·	1.2 km	MPC · JPL
544021	2014 RL_{13}	—	November 15, 2006	Mount Lemmon	Mount Lemmon Survey	·	1.9 km	MPC · JPL
544022	2014 RR_{15}	—	August 30, 2005	Anderson Mesa	LONEOS	·	1.2 km	MPC · JPL
544023	2014 RY_{15}	—	September 2, 2014	Haleakala	Pan-STARRS 1	(5)	920 m	MPC · JPL
544024	2014 RX_{16}	—	September 6, 2014	Mount Lemmon	Mount Lemmon Survey	·	1.3 km	MPC · JPL
544025	2014 RE_{19}	—	August 29, 2009	Catalina	CSS	·	2.0 km	MPC · JPL
544026	2014 RS_{23}	—	October 18, 2001	Palomar	NEAT	·	1.6 km	MPC · JPL
544027	2014 RL_{24}	—	October 11, 2007	La Cañada	Lacruz, J.	·	1.1 km	MPC · JPL
544028	2014 RU_{25}	—	September 12, 2007	Mount Lemmon	Mount Lemmon Survey	·	1.2 km	MPC · JPL
544029	2014 RH_{26}	—	May 3, 2006	Mount Lemmon	Mount Lemmon Survey	·	1.4 km	MPC · JPL
544030	2014 RR_{26}	—	October 29, 2010	Mount Lemmon	Mount Lemmon Survey	·	1.3 km	MPC · JPL
544031	2014 RS_{26}	—	September 27, 2006	Mount Lemmon	Mount Lemmon Survey	·	2.3 km	MPC · JPL
544032	2014 RU_{26}	—	June 22, 2009	Mount Lemmon	Mount Lemmon Survey	BRA	1.4 km	MPC · JPL
544033 Lihsing	2014 RR_{27}	Lihsing	September 15, 2007	Lulin	LUSS	·	860 m	MPC · JPL
544034	2014 RO_{29}	—	August 5, 2014	Haleakala	Pan-STARRS 1	·	990 m	MPC · JPL
544035	2014 RQ_{30}	—	October 19, 2006	Kitt Peak	Spacewatch	·	1.5 km	MPC · JPL
544036	2014 RY_{31}	—	January 19, 2012	Haleakala	Pan-STARRS 1	·	1.0 km	MPC · JPL
544037	2014 RK_{34}	—	December 1, 2008	Kitt Peak	Spacewatch	·	720 m	MPC · JPL
544038	2014 RZ_{34}	—	February 26, 2012	Haleakala	Pan-STARRS 1	ADE	1.7 km	MPC · JPL
544039	2014 RX_{40}	—	September 20, 2006	Catalina	CSS	·	1.0 km	MPC · JPL
544040	2014 RL_{43}	—	November 25, 2006	Mount Lemmon	Mount Lemmon Survey	·	1.3 km	MPC · JPL
544041	2014 RJ_{46}	—	June 3, 2006	Mount Lemmon	Mount Lemmon Survey	MAS	880 m	MPC · JPL
544042	2014 RW_{47}	—	October 2, 2010	Mount Lemmon	Mount Lemmon Survey	·	1.2 km	MPC · JPL
544043	2014 RX_{50}	—	August 22, 2014	Haleakala	Pan-STARRS 1	·	1.8 km	MPC · JPL
544044	2014 RZ_{50}	—	September 14, 2014	Mount Lemmon	Mount Lemmon Survey	·	1.4 km	MPC · JPL
544045	2014 RR_{52}	—	October 13, 2010	Mount Lemmon	Mount Lemmon Survey	NEM	1.6 km	MPC · JPL
544046	2014 RF_{54}	—	May 1, 2009	Kitt Peak	Spacewatch	·	990 m	MPC · JPL
544047	2014 RV_{56}	—	March 3, 2006	Kitt Peak	Spacewatch	·	800 m	MPC · JPL
544048	2014 RP_{57}	—	March 2, 2008	Kitt Peak	Spacewatch	·	1.4 km	MPC · JPL
544049	2014 RS_{58}	—	October 20, 2003	Palomar	NEAT	·	1.2 km	MPC · JPL
544050	2014 RQ_{59}	—	September 19, 2009	Mount Lemmon	Mount Lemmon Survey	·	1.3 km	MPC · JPL
544051	2014 RW_{62}	—	November 6, 2005	Kitt Peak	Spacewatch	·	1.6 km	MPC · JPL
544052	2014 RG_{63}	—	September 30, 2003	Kitt Peak	Spacewatch	·	1.3 km	MPC · JPL
544053	2014 RK_{63}	—	March 26, 2001	Kitt Peak	Spacewatch	·	1.8 km	MPC · JPL
544054	2014 RB_{65}	—	October 22, 2006	Mount Lemmon	Mount Lemmon Survey	·	1.3 km	MPC · JPL
544055	2014 RE_{65}	—	November 25, 2006	Kitt Peak	Spacewatch	·	2.3 km	MPC · JPL
544056	2014 RG_{65}	—	October 24, 2009	Mount Lemmon	Mount Lemmon Survey	·	2.2 km	MPC · JPL
544057	2014 RL_{66}	—	September 14, 2014	Haleakala	Pan-STARRS 1	EUN	1.1 km	MPC · JPL
544058	2014 RM_{66}	—	July 24, 2000	Kitt Peak	Spacewatch	·	2.1 km	MPC · JPL
544059	2014 RN_{66}	—	September 2, 2014	Haleakala	Pan-STARRS 1	·	1.3 km	MPC · JPL
544060	2014 RF_{67}	—	February 25, 2012	Kitt Peak	Spacewatch	WIT	900 m	MPC · JPL
544061	2014 RD_{68}	—	July 8, 2005	Kitt Peak	Spacewatch	·	1.7 km	MPC · JPL
544062	2014 RV_{68}	—	August 5, 2005	Palomar	NEAT	·	1.2 km	MPC · JPL
544063	2014 RH_{69}	—	December 13, 2010	Kitt Peak	Spacewatch	·	2.2 km	MPC · JPL
544064	2014 RA_{70}	—	September 2, 2014	Haleakala	Pan-STARRS 1	HNS	1.1 km	MPC · JPL
544065	2014 RP_{71}	—	October 30, 2005	Kitt Peak	Spacewatch	·	1.4 km	MPC · JPL
544066	2014 SA_{5}	—	March 6, 2008	Mount Lemmon	Mount Lemmon Survey	·	1.9 km	MPC · JPL
544067	2014 SO_{5}	—	September 10, 2010	Mount Lemmon	Mount Lemmon Survey	·	1.1 km	MPC · JPL
544068	2014 SS_{8}	—	August 20, 2014	Haleakala	Pan-STARRS 1	ADE	1.3 km	MPC · JPL
544069	2014 SR_{9}	—	October 14, 2007	Mount Lemmon	Mount Lemmon Survey	CLA	1.5 km	MPC · JPL
544070	2014 SA_{11}	—	September 15, 2006	Kitt Peak	Spacewatch	EUN	1.1 km	MPC · JPL
544071	2014 SJ_{20}	—	December 6, 2007	Mount Lemmon	Mount Lemmon Survey	NYS	1.1 km	MPC · JPL
544072	2014 SK_{23}	—	January 16, 2005	Kitt Peak	Spacewatch	MAS	720 m	MPC · JPL
544073	2014 SG_{25}	—	August 20, 2014	Haleakala	Pan-STARRS 1	·	1.4 km	MPC · JPL
544074	2014 SR_{26}	—	December 1, 2010	Mount Lemmon	Mount Lemmon Survey	·	1.4 km	MPC · JPL
544075	2014 SM_{29}	—	March 13, 2012	Mount Lemmon	Mount Lemmon Survey	·	1.4 km	MPC · JPL
544076	2014 SN_{29}	—	March 14, 2007	Mount Lemmon	Mount Lemmon Survey	·	2.3 km	MPC · JPL
544077	2014 SM_{32}	—	April 7, 2006	Mount Lemmon	Mount Lemmon Survey	NYS	870 m	MPC · JPL
544078	2014 SW_{35}	—	August 27, 2014	Haleakala	Pan-STARRS 1	SUL	1.6 km	MPC · JPL
544079	2014 SY_{38}	—	March 2, 2008	Mount Lemmon	Mount Lemmon Survey	·	1.2 km	MPC · JPL
544080	2014 SA_{39}	—	November 17, 2011	Kitt Peak	Spacewatch	V	680 m	MPC · JPL
544081	2014 SQ_{39}	—	February 3, 2012	Mount Lemmon	Mount Lemmon Survey	·	1.0 km	MPC · JPL
544082	2014 SD_{41}	—	December 29, 2011	Mount Lemmon	Mount Lemmon Survey	·	1 km	MPC · JPL
544083	2014 SL_{41}	—	August 28, 2014	Haleakala	Pan-STARRS 1	·	1.1 km	MPC · JPL
544084	2014 SO_{42}	—	March 2, 2009	Mount Lemmon	Mount Lemmon Survey	·	1.2 km	MPC · JPL
544085	2014 SM_{47}	—	May 15, 2013	Haleakala	Pan-STARRS 1	·	1.3 km	MPC · JPL
544086	2014 SN_{47}	—	December 15, 2006	Kitt Peak	Spacewatch	AGN	1.0 km	MPC · JPL
544087	2014 SV_{47}	—	August 29, 2006	Kitt Peak	Spacewatch	·	920 m	MPC · JPL
544088	2014 SK_{49}	—	October 2, 2006	Mount Lemmon	Mount Lemmon Survey	(5)	1.1 km	MPC · JPL
544089	2014 SQ_{52}	—	February 28, 2012	Haleakala	Pan-STARRS 1	·	1.3 km	MPC · JPL
544090	2014 SK_{54}	—	January 2, 2009	Kitt Peak	Spacewatch	·	940 m	MPC · JPL
544091	2014 SX_{57}	—	December 17, 2007	Mount Lemmon	Mount Lemmon Survey	·	1.2 km	MPC · JPL
544092	2014 SH_{63}	—	July 25, 2006	Mount Lemmon	Mount Lemmon Survey	·	1.2 km	MPC · JPL
544093	2014 SM_{67}	—	November 20, 2007	Mount Lemmon	Mount Lemmon Survey	·	1.3 km	MPC · JPL
544094	2014 ST_{72}	—	February 26, 2012	Kitt Peak	Spacewatch	BRA	1.4 km	MPC · JPL
544095	2014 SW_{75}	—	October 21, 2007	Mount Lemmon	Mount Lemmon Survey	·	1.3 km	MPC · JPL
544096	2014 SD_{77}	—	October 1, 2010	Mount Lemmon	Mount Lemmon Survey	·	1.5 km	MPC · JPL
544097	2014 SF_{80}	—	December 17, 2007	Mount Lemmon	Mount Lemmon Survey	·	990 m	MPC · JPL
544098	2014 SO_{80}	—	July 30, 2005	Palomar	NEAT	·	1.6 km	MPC · JPL
544099	2014 SX_{80}	—	August 28, 2014	Haleakala	Pan-STARRS 1	·	1.2 km	MPC · JPL
544100	2014 SN_{84}	—	February 27, 2012	Haleakala	Pan-STARRS 1	·	1.0 km	MPC · JPL

== 544101–544200 ==
back to top

Designation			Discovery			Properties		Ref
Permanent	Provisional	Named after	Date	Site	Discoverer(s)	Category	Diam.	Ref
544101	2014 SJ_{93}	—	September 2, 2014	Haleakala	Pan-STARRS 1	·	1 km	MPC · JPL
544102	2014 SA_{95}	—	March 28, 2012	Mount Lemmon	Mount Lemmon Survey	MRX	760 m	MPC · JPL
544103	2014 SV_{96}	—	February 20, 2009	Mount Lemmon	Mount Lemmon Survey	·	1.1 km	MPC · JPL
544104	2014 SH_{106}	—	December 14, 2010	Mount Lemmon	Mount Lemmon Survey	AGN	950 m	MPC · JPL
544105	2014 SW_{110}	—	August 27, 2014	Haleakala	Pan-STARRS 1	·	1.4 km	MPC · JPL
544106	2014 SE_{112}	—	October 27, 2006	Mount Lemmon	Mount Lemmon Survey	·	770 m	MPC · JPL
544107	2014 SC_{113}	—	September 18, 2014	Haleakala	Pan-STARRS 1	·	1.5 km	MPC · JPL
544108	2014 SS_{116}	—	August 19, 2006	Kitt Peak	Spacewatch	·	1.0 km	MPC · JPL
544109	2014 SP_{117}	—	February 25, 1995	Kitt Peak	Spacewatch	(5)	950 m	MPC · JPL
544110	2014 SF_{119}	—	September 26, 2005	Kitt Peak	Spacewatch	·	1.5 km	MPC · JPL
544111	2014 SW_{119}	—	November 1, 2005	Kitt Peak	Spacewatch	·	1.8 km	MPC · JPL
544112	2014 SB_{120}	—	September 7, 2014	Haleakala	Pan-STARRS 1	MRX	1.0 km	MPC · JPL
544113	2014 SF_{124}	—	June 7, 2013	Haleakala	Pan-STARRS 1	MAS	690 m	MPC · JPL
544114	2014 SL_{132}	—	October 3, 2006	Mount Lemmon	Mount Lemmon Survey	·	980 m	MPC · JPL
544115	2014 SE_{135}	—	February 9, 2003	Haleakala	NEAT	BRG	1.4 km	MPC · JPL
544116	2014 SA_{136}	—	September 19, 2014	Cerro Tololo-LCO B	Lister, T.	MAR	920 m	MPC · JPL
544117	2014 SQ_{139}	—	November 12, 2010	Mount Lemmon	Mount Lemmon Survey	·	1.4 km	MPC · JPL
544118	2014 SD_{147}	—	February 6, 2007	Mount Lemmon	Mount Lemmon Survey	AGN	1.2 km	MPC · JPL
544119	2014 SQ_{148}	—	August 31, 2008	Punaauia	Teamo, N.	·	2.4 km	MPC · JPL
544120	2014 SG_{149}	—	August 14, 2010	Kitt Peak	Spacewatch	·	1.1 km	MPC · JPL
544121	2014 SB_{150}	—	December 12, 2010	Kitt Peak	Spacewatch	AEO	1.1 km	MPC · JPL
544122	2014 SH_{150}	—	March 29, 2008	Kitt Peak	Spacewatch	·	1.9 km	MPC · JPL
544123	2014 SU_{150}	—	March 2, 2006	Mount Lemmon	Mount Lemmon Survey	NYS	980 m	MPC · JPL
544124	2014 SF_{163}	—	December 9, 2006	Kitt Peak	Spacewatch	·	1.4 km	MPC · JPL
544125	2014 SG_{164}	—	October 1, 2005	Mount Lemmon	Mount Lemmon Survey	·	1.8 km	MPC · JPL
544126	2014 SK_{164}	—	February 12, 2011	Mount Lemmon	Mount Lemmon Survey	·	2.0 km	MPC · JPL
544127	2014 SB_{168}	—	September 20, 2014	Mount Lemmon	Mount Lemmon Survey	·	2.0 km	MPC · JPL
544128	2014 SN_{168}	—	October 21, 2006	Kitt Peak	Spacewatch	·	1.7 km	MPC · JPL
544129	2014 SZ_{168}	—	October 4, 2010	Mount Lemmon	Mount Lemmon Survey	PHO	880 m	MPC · JPL
544130	2014 SN_{169}	—	December 18, 2003	Kitt Peak	Spacewatch	PHO	770 m	MPC · JPL
544131	2014 SP_{169}	—	August 29, 2014	Haleakala	Pan-STARRS 1	MAR	840 m	MPC · JPL
544132	2014 SZ_{169}	—	August 29, 2014	Haleakala	Pan-STARRS 1	TIR	3.4 km	MPC · JPL
544133	2014 SD_{171}	—	October 20, 2006	Mount Lemmon	Mount Lemmon Survey	·	2.0 km	MPC · JPL
544134	2014 SE_{176}	—	November 10, 2010	Mount Lemmon	Mount Lemmon Survey	NEM	2.0 km	MPC · JPL
544135	2014 SG_{176}	—	September 5, 2010	Mount Lemmon	Mount Lemmon Survey	·	1.3 km	MPC · JPL
544136	2014 SN_{182}	—	September 20, 2014	Haleakala	Pan-STARRS 1	·	1.5 km	MPC · JPL
544137	2014 SX_{183}	—	September 21, 2003	Kitt Peak	Spacewatch	PHO	1.1 km	MPC · JPL
544138	2014 SE_{185}	—	December 27, 2006	Kitt Peak	Spacewatch	·	1.8 km	MPC · JPL
544139	2014 SJ_{185}	—	October 11, 2006	Palomar	NEAT	·	940 m	MPC · JPL
544140	2014 SJ_{187}	—	October 11, 2001	Palomar	NEAT	·	1.8 km	MPC · JPL
544141	2014 SQ_{191}	—	April 8, 2003	Palomar	NEAT	MRX	1.2 km	MPC · JPL
544142	2014 SE_{192}	—	April 3, 2008	Kitt Peak	Spacewatch	·	1.7 km	MPC · JPL
544143	2014 SR_{192}	—	October 6, 2005	Kitt Peak	Spacewatch	·	1.8 km	MPC · JPL
544144	2014 SL_{195}	—	November 19, 2006	Catalina	CSS	(5)	1.1 km	MPC · JPL
544145	2014 SP_{195}	—	April 8, 2002	Palomar	NEAT	NYS	1.3 km	MPC · JPL
544146	2014 SQ_{196}	—	March 6, 2008	Mount Lemmon	Mount Lemmon Survey	·	1.2 km	MPC · JPL
544147	2014 SR_{196}	—	December 2, 2010	Mount Lemmon	Mount Lemmon Survey	·	1.3 km	MPC · JPL
544148	2014 SM_{198}	—	November 1, 2010	Mount Lemmon	Mount Lemmon Survey	·	1.2 km	MPC · JPL
544149	2014 ST_{205}	—	February 1, 2009	Kitt Peak	Spacewatch	MAS	650 m	MPC · JPL
544150	2014 SW_{208}	—	September 20, 2014	Haleakala	Pan-STARRS 1	·	990 m	MPC · JPL
544151	2014 SJ_{209}	—	January 26, 2011	Mount Lemmon	Mount Lemmon Survey	GEF	1.0 km	MPC · JPL
544152	2014 SX_{210}	—	September 20, 2014	Haleakala	Pan-STARRS 1	·	1.7 km	MPC · JPL
544153	2014 SC_{211}	—	March 24, 2012	Mount Lemmon	Mount Lemmon Survey	·	1.5 km	MPC · JPL
544154	2014 SS_{211}	—	September 4, 2014	Haleakala	Pan-STARRS 1	·	3.0 km	MPC · JPL
544155	2014 SF_{212}	—	August 30, 2005	Kitt Peak	Spacewatch	·	1.2 km	MPC · JPL
544156	2014 SQ_{213}	—	March 13, 2011	Mount Lemmon	Mount Lemmon Survey	·	1.8 km	MPC · JPL
544157	2014 ST_{213}	—	February 21, 2007	Kitt Peak	Spacewatch	·	1.9 km	MPC · JPL
544158	2014 SV_{213}	—	September 20, 2014	Haleakala	Pan-STARRS 1	LIX	2.7 km	MPC · JPL
544159	2014 SJ_{214}	—	December 16, 2006	Mount Lemmon	Mount Lemmon Survey	·	1.7 km	MPC · JPL
544160	2014 SF_{215}	—	November 19, 2006	Catalina	CSS	·	1.7 km	MPC · JPL
544161	2014 SY_{215}	—	September 4, 2014	Haleakala	Pan-STARRS 1	BRA	1.2 km	MPC · JPL
544162	2014 SL_{216}	—	March 13, 2011	Kitt Peak	Spacewatch	·	1.8 km	MPC · JPL
544163	2014 SK_{218}	—	June 3, 2005	Kitt Peak	Spacewatch	·	1.4 km	MPC · JPL
544164	2014 ST_{219}	—	September 12, 2005	Kitt Peak	Spacewatch	HNS	1.1 km	MPC · JPL
544165	2014 SA_{221}	—	December 1, 2010	Mount Lemmon	Mount Lemmon Survey	·	2.1 km	MPC · JPL
544166	2014 SK_{234}	—	May 30, 2005	Siding Spring	SSS	EUN	1.8 km	MPC · JPL
544167	2014 SZ_{235}	—	November 23, 1998	Kitt Peak	Spacewatch	·	1.2 km	MPC · JPL
544168	2014 SB_{238}	—	April 27, 2008	Mount Lemmon	Mount Lemmon Survey	·	2.2 km	MPC · JPL
544169	2014 SM_{238}	—	September 27, 2006	Catalina	CSS	·	930 m	MPC · JPL
544170	2014 SW_{239}	—	October 28, 2010	Kitt Peak	Spacewatch	EUN	1.0 km	MPC · JPL
544171	2014 SA_{240}	—	August 15, 2014	Haleakala	Pan-STARRS 1	·	1.9 km	MPC · JPL
544172	2014 SO_{240}	—	October 21, 2011	Mount Lemmon	Mount Lemmon Survey	·	1.0 km	MPC · JPL
544173	2014 SC_{241}	—	February 3, 2012	Haleakala	Pan-STARRS 1	MAR	840 m	MPC · JPL
544174	2014 SP_{241}	—	July 31, 2014	Haleakala	Pan-STARRS 1	·	1.6 km	MPC · JPL
544175	2014 SO_{244}	—	December 6, 2011	Haleakala	Pan-STARRS 1	·	1.1 km	MPC · JPL
544176	2014 SG_{247}	—	November 30, 2003	Kitt Peak	Spacewatch	·	1.4 km	MPC · JPL
544177	2014 SQ_{249}	—	April 30, 2008	Mount Lemmon	Mount Lemmon Survey	·	1.7 km	MPC · JPL
544178	2014 SB_{251}	—	September 15, 2010	Kitt Peak	Spacewatch	·	870 m	MPC · JPL
544179	2014 SU_{262}	—	October 30, 2010	Mount Lemmon	Mount Lemmon Survey	·	1.2 km	MPC · JPL
544180	2014 SM_{263}	—	September 14, 2014	Catalina	CSS	·	1.5 km	MPC · JPL
544181	2014 SY_{265}	—	September 13, 2014	Haleakala	Pan-STARRS 1	MAR	820 m	MPC · JPL
544182	2014 SL_{266}	—	July 20, 2001	Palomar	NEAT	MAR	1.2 km	MPC · JPL
544183	2014 SW_{266}	—	July 13, 2009	Kitt Peak	Spacewatch	·	2.1 km	MPC · JPL
544184	2014 SM_{284}	—	August 25, 2000	Cerro Tololo	Deep Ecliptic Survey	·	1.6 km	MPC · JPL
544185	2014 SP_{284}	—	September 23, 2014	Mount Lemmon	Mount Lemmon Survey	ADE	1.5 km	MPC · JPL
544186	2014 SM_{286}	—	October 21, 2006	Lulin	LUSS	·	1 km	MPC · JPL
544187	2014 SG_{289}	—	December 25, 2010	Mount Lemmon	Mount Lemmon Survey	·	2.1 km	MPC · JPL
544188	2014 SS_{289}	—	January 19, 2012	Haleakala	Pan-STARRS 1	·	1.0 km	MPC · JPL
544189	2014 SM_{293}	—	June 14, 2013	Mount Lemmon	Mount Lemmon Survey	·	3.0 km	MPC · JPL
544190	2014 SW_{294}	—	September 1, 2014	Catalina	CSS	·	1.8 km	MPC · JPL
544191	2014 SM_{295}	—	October 29, 2005	Palomar	NEAT	·	2.3 km	MPC · JPL
544192	2014 SY_{295}	—	January 1, 2012	Mount Lemmon	Mount Lemmon Survey	·	1.7 km	MPC · JPL
544193	2014 SV_{300}	—	October 30, 2010	Kitt Peak	Spacewatch	(5)	890 m	MPC · JPL
544194	2014 SB_{302}	—	November 22, 2005	Kitt Peak	Spacewatch	·	2.4 km	MPC · JPL
544195	2014 SC_{305}	—	April 11, 2005	Mount Lemmon	Mount Lemmon Survey	·	1.4 km	MPC · JPL
544196	2014 SG_{307}	—	August 13, 2010	Kitt Peak	Spacewatch	NYS	1.1 km	MPC · JPL
544197	2014 SA_{310}	—	March 19, 2007	Mount Lemmon	Mount Lemmon Survey	·	2.5 km	MPC · JPL
544198	2014 SY_{311}	—	March 16, 2012	Mount Lemmon	Mount Lemmon Survey	EUN	950 m	MPC · JPL
544199	2014 SJ_{314}	—	March 15, 2013	Mount Lemmon	Mount Lemmon Survey	·	1.5 km	MPC · JPL
544200	2014 SZ_{322}	—	March 17, 2012	Mount Lemmon	Mount Lemmon Survey	·	1.7 km	MPC · JPL

== 544201–544300 ==
back to top

Designation			Discovery			Properties		Ref
Permanent	Provisional	Named after	Date	Site	Discoverer(s)	Category	Diam.	Ref
544201	2014 SD_{323}	—	September 27, 2006	Mount Lemmon	Mount Lemmon Survey	EUN	1.0 km	MPC · JPL
544202	2014 SF_{327}	—	October 12, 2010	Kitt Peak	Spacewatch	·	870 m	MPC · JPL
544203	2014 SP_{328}	—	September 26, 2014	Catalina	CSS	·	2.8 km	MPC · JPL
544204	2014 SS_{328}	—	September 26, 2014	Catalina	CSS	TIR	2.3 km	MPC · JPL
544205	2014 SM_{329}	—	September 16, 2009	Mount Lemmon	Mount Lemmon Survey	EOS	1.5 km	MPC · JPL
544206	2014 SF_{332}	—	January 28, 2007	Mount Lemmon	Mount Lemmon Survey	·	2.2 km	MPC · JPL
544207	2014 SG_{332}	—	July 29, 2009	Kitt Peak	Spacewatch	·	1.5 km	MPC · JPL
544208	2014 SG_{333}	—	January 26, 2011	Mount Lemmon	Mount Lemmon Survey	·	1.5 km	MPC · JPL
544209	2014 SG_{334}	—	October 2, 2006	Mount Lemmon	Mount Lemmon Survey	·	960 m	MPC · JPL
544210	2014 SN_{335}	—	September 20, 2014	Haleakala	Pan-STARRS 1	·	1.4 km	MPC · JPL
544211	2014 SO_{339}	—	August 24, 2003	Palomar	NEAT	·	3.1 km	MPC · JPL
544212	2014 SV_{344}	—	November 13, 2010	Mount Lemmon	Mount Lemmon Survey	·	1.1 km	MPC · JPL
544213	2014 SX_{344}	—	September 29, 2014	Haleakala	Pan-STARRS 1	·	1.1 km	MPC · JPL
544214	2014 SC_{354}	—	February 25, 2007	Mount Lemmon	Mount Lemmon Survey	·	1.7 km	MPC · JPL
544215	2014 SG_{355}	—	November 25, 2005	Mount Lemmon	Mount Lemmon Survey	·	1.4 km	MPC · JPL
544216	2014 SK_{355}	—	September 22, 2014	Haleakala	Pan-STARRS 1	·	1.5 km	MPC · JPL
544217	2014 SM_{356}	—	August 20, 2009	Kitt Peak	Spacewatch	·	1.9 km	MPC · JPL
544218	2014 SM_{357}	—	May 5, 2008	Kitt Peak	Spacewatch	·	2.0 km	MPC · JPL
544219	2014 SZ_{358}	—	January 27, 2007	Kitt Peak	Spacewatch	·	1.3 km	MPC · JPL
544220	2014 SV_{361}	—	November 6, 2010	Kitt Peak	Spacewatch	·	1.2 km	MPC · JPL
544221	2014 SV_{362}	—	September 25, 2014	Kitt Peak	Spacewatch	·	1.3 km	MPC · JPL
544222	2014 SE_{363}	—	September 29, 2014	Haleakala	Pan-STARRS 1	·	1.7 km	MPC · JPL
544223	2014 SD_{366}	—	December 8, 2015	Haleakala	Pan-STARRS 1	MAR	850 m	MPC · JPL
544224	2014 TA_{1}	—	June 11, 2005	Kitt Peak	Spacewatch	·	1.5 km	MPC · JPL
544225	2014 TR_{2}	—	October 1, 2014	Catalina	CSS	·	2.0 km	MPC · JPL
544226	2014 TW_{9}	—	October 1, 2014	Haleakala	Pan-STARRS 1	MRX	750 m	MPC · JPL
544227	2014 TA_{10}	—	January 21, 2002	Kitt Peak	Spacewatch	·	1.9 km	MPC · JPL
544228	2014 TF_{10}	—	October 1, 2014	Haleakala	Pan-STARRS 1	EOS	2.2 km	MPC · JPL
544229	2014 TL_{10}	—	October 1, 2014	Haleakala	Pan-STARRS 1	·	3.3 km	MPC · JPL
544230	2014 TV_{16}	—	September 18, 2009	Catalina	CSS	H	510 m	MPC · JPL
544231	2014 TR_{24}	—	October 27, 2009	Mount Lemmon	Mount Lemmon Survey	·	2.5 km	MPC · JPL
544232	2014 TC_{25}	—	October 20, 2006	Kitt Peak	Spacewatch	·	930 m	MPC · JPL
544233	2014 TC_{26}	—	December 5, 1999	Kitt Peak	Spacewatch	·	960 m	MPC · JPL
544234	2014 TW_{29}	—	October 22, 2005	Palomar	NEAT	·	2.0 km	MPC · JPL
544235	2014 TB_{34}	—	April 10, 2013	Siding Spring	SSS	·	530 m	MPC · JPL
544236	2014 TF_{37}	—	December 27, 2006	Mount Lemmon	Mount Lemmon Survey	EUN	1.4 km	MPC · JPL
544237	2014 TB_{38}	—	September 23, 2001	Palomar	NEAT	·	2.5 km	MPC · JPL
544238	2014 TM_{42}	—	July 20, 2001	Palomar	NEAT	·	1.5 km	MPC · JPL
544239	2014 TY_{42}	—	November 11, 2010	Mount Lemmon	Mount Lemmon Survey	·	1.1 km	MPC · JPL
544240	2014 TP_{46}	—	September 15, 2004	Kitt Peak	Spacewatch	KOR	1.1 km	MPC · JPL
544241	2014 TP_{50}	—	October 27, 2005	Mount Lemmon	Mount Lemmon Survey	·	2.0 km	MPC · JPL
544242	2014 TT_{50}	—	November 13, 2010	Kitt Peak	Spacewatch	·	1.1 km	MPC · JPL
544243	2014 TK_{51}	—	September 26, 2005	Kitt Peak	Spacewatch	ADE	2.2 km	MPC · JPL
544244	2014 TL_{52}	—	March 16, 2012	Mount Lemmon	Mount Lemmon Survey	·	2.1 km	MPC · JPL
544245	2014 TV_{52}	—	September 25, 2008	Mount Lemmon	Mount Lemmon Survey	VER	2.5 km	MPC · JPL
544246	2014 TA_{55}	—	February 21, 2007	Kitt Peak	Spacewatch	·	1.5 km	MPC · JPL
544247	2014 TO_{55}	—	July 20, 2002	Palomar	NEAT	·	3.7 km	MPC · JPL
544248	2014 TK_{56}	—	April 28, 2012	Mount Lemmon	Mount Lemmon Survey	NEM	2.6 km	MPC · JPL
544249	2014 TF_{60}	—	April 12, 2013	Haleakala	Pan-STARRS 1	·	1.1 km	MPC · JPL
544250	2014 TV_{61}	—	September 1, 2005	Kitt Peak	Spacewatch	·	1.6 km	MPC · JPL
544251	2014 TT_{64}	—	October 1, 2014	Catalina	CSS	EUN	1.0 km	MPC · JPL
544252	2014 TL_{71}	—	February 19, 2012	Kitt Peak	Spacewatch	·	2.4 km	MPC · JPL
544253	2014 TG_{72}	—	September 25, 2009	Mount Lemmon	Mount Lemmon Survey	·	2.6 km	MPC · JPL
544254	2014 TP_{72}	—	September 24, 2014	Mount Lemmon	Mount Lemmon Survey	·	1.2 km	MPC · JPL
544255	2014 TH_{75}	—	June 23, 2009	Siding Spring	SSS	ADE	2.2 km	MPC · JPL
544256	2014 TQ_{76}	—	March 26, 2006	Kitt Peak	Spacewatch	·	920 m	MPC · JPL
544257	2014 TD_{79}	—	January 10, 2007	Mount Lemmon	Mount Lemmon Survey	·	1.5 km	MPC · JPL
544258	2014 TO_{80}	—	October 29, 2005	Kitt Peak	Spacewatch	·	2.1 km	MPC · JPL
544259	2014 TO_{82}	—	July 18, 2001	Palomar	NEAT	·	1.5 km	MPC · JPL
544260	2014 TT_{83}	—	October 15, 2009	Mount Lemmon	Mount Lemmon Survey	·	1.7 km	MPC · JPL
544261	2014 TA_{84}	—	July 14, 2001	Palomar	NEAT	·	1.8 km	MPC · JPL
544262	2014 TP_{85}	—	May 15, 2009	Kitt Peak	Spacewatch	·	1.2 km	MPC · JPL
544263	2014 TR_{85}	—	June 30, 2014	Haleakala	Pan-STARRS 1	·	1.8 km	MPC · JPL
544264	2014 TH_{86}	—	October 4, 2014	Haleakala	Pan-STARRS 1	H	600 m	MPC · JPL
544265	2014 TQ_{86}	—	March 4, 2013	Haleakala	Pan-STARRS 1	H	360 m	MPC · JPL
544266	2014 TD_{87}	—	September 25, 2005	Apache Point	SDSS Collaboration	·	1.3 km	MPC · JPL
544267	2014 TP_{87}	—	April 17, 2005	Kitt Peak	Spacewatch	·	3.1 km	MPC · JPL
544268	2014 TX_{88}	—	October 6, 2013	Catalina	CSS	·	3.5 km	MPC · JPL
544269	2014 TT_{89}	—	February 11, 2011	Mount Lemmon	Mount Lemmon Survey	EOS	1.7 km	MPC · JPL
544270	2014 TV_{92}	—	October 2, 2014	Haleakala	Pan-STARRS 1	·	1.6 km	MPC · JPL
544271	2014 TO_{93}	—	October 3, 2014	Mount Lemmon	Mount Lemmon Survey	·	1.9 km	MPC · JPL
544272	2014 TZ_{94}	—	March 11, 2007	Mount Lemmon	Mount Lemmon Survey	AGN	1.1 km	MPC · JPL
544273	2014 TB_{95}	—	March 21, 2012	Mount Lemmon	Mount Lemmon Survey	·	1.3 km	MPC · JPL
544274	2014 TS_{95}	—	October 4, 2014	Haleakala	Pan-STARRS 1	HNS	1.3 km	MPC · JPL
544275	2014 UG	—	March 29, 2012	Kitt Peak	Spacewatch	·	2.0 km	MPC · JPL
544276	2014 UW_{6}	—	April 5, 2008	Mount Lemmon	Mount Lemmon Survey	·	1.3 km	MPC · JPL
544277	2014 UD_{7}	—	November 18, 2003	Kitt Peak	Spacewatch	·	2.9 km	MPC · JPL
544278	2014 UO_{7}	—	October 3, 2014	Mount Lemmon	Mount Lemmon Survey	·	1.8 km	MPC · JPL
544279	2014 UD_{10}	—	September 16, 2003	Kitt Peak	Spacewatch	·	1.8 km	MPC · JPL
544280	2014 US_{10}	—	August 23, 2008	Siding Spring	SSS	·	2.9 km	MPC · JPL
544281	2014 UZ_{10}	—	October 3, 2014	Mount Lemmon	Mount Lemmon Survey	·	1.6 km	MPC · JPL
544282	2014 UD_{11}	—	December 1, 2005	Kitt Peak	Spacewatch	·	1.7 km	MPC · JPL
544283	2014 UO_{11}	—	October 17, 2014	Kitt Peak	Spacewatch	MRX	790 m	MPC · JPL
544284	2014 UX_{11}	—	August 29, 2005	Palomar	NEAT	·	1.7 km	MPC · JPL
544285	2014 UJ_{15}	—	February 14, 2012	Haleakala	Pan-STARRS 1	·	2.1 km	MPC · JPL
544286	2014 UG_{17}	—	January 25, 2007	Kitt Peak	Spacewatch	·	1.4 km	MPC · JPL
544287	2014 UH_{17}	—	February 22, 2003	Palomar	NEAT	·	2.0 km	MPC · JPL
544288	2014 UF_{18}	—	October 22, 2005	Kitt Peak	Spacewatch	·	1.8 km	MPC · JPL
544289	2014 UB_{21}	—	January 13, 2011	Kitt Peak	Spacewatch	·	1.6 km	MPC · JPL
544290	2014 UM_{21}	—	May 14, 2013	Nogales	M. Schwartz, P. R. Holvorcem	·	2.3 km	MPC · JPL
544291	2014 UO_{21}	—	September 16, 2009	Catalina	CSS	DOR	2.3 km	MPC · JPL
544292	2014 UP_{21}	—	September 20, 2014	Haleakala	Pan-STARRS 1	·	1.2 km	MPC · JPL
544293	2014 UW_{23}	—	August 31, 2014	Haleakala	Pan-STARRS 1	·	1.6 km	MPC · JPL
544294	2014 UF_{28}	—	December 13, 2010	Mount Lemmon	Mount Lemmon Survey	·	1.3 km	MPC · JPL
544295	2014 UP_{28}	—	April 19, 2007	Kitt Peak	Spacewatch	·	2.1 km	MPC · JPL
544296	2014 UH_{30}	—	September 26, 2005	Kitt Peak	Spacewatch	·	1.5 km	MPC · JPL
544297	2014 UJ_{34}	—	October 23, 2014	Nogales	M. Schwartz, P. R. Holvorcem	·	1.7 km	MPC · JPL
544298	2014 UA_{42}	—	December 10, 2004	Kitt Peak	Spacewatch	·	1.8 km	MPC · JPL
544299	2014 UW_{42}	—	October 13, 2010	Mount Lemmon	Mount Lemmon Survey	(5)	870 m	MPC · JPL
544300	2014 UV_{43}	—	October 7, 2005	Kitt Peak	Spacewatch	·	1.6 km	MPC · JPL

== 544301–544400 ==
back to top

Designation			Discovery			Properties		Ref
Permanent	Provisional	Named after	Date	Site	Discoverer(s)	Category	Diam.	Ref
544301	2014 UD_{45}	—	October 26, 2005	Kitt Peak	Spacewatch	·	1.6 km	MPC · JPL
544302	2014 UN_{48}	—	March 10, 2008	Catalina	CSS	·	1.4 km	MPC · JPL
544303	2014 UL_{50}	—	October 21, 2014	Kitt Peak	Spacewatch	EOS	1.7 km	MPC · JPL
544304	2014 UH_{51}	—	November 16, 2009	Kitt Peak	Spacewatch	·	2.2 km	MPC · JPL
544305	2014 UA_{55}	—	March 26, 2007	Kitt Peak	Spacewatch	·	1.3 km	MPC · JPL
544306	2014 UE_{55}	—	December 10, 2010	Kitt Peak	Spacewatch	·	1.4 km	MPC · JPL
544307	2014 UQ_{55}	—	October 21, 2006	Lulin	LUSS	·	1.2 km	MPC · JPL
544308	2014 UF_{59}	—	November 27, 2010	Mount Lemmon	Mount Lemmon Survey	·	1.6 km	MPC · JPL
544309 Reuss	2014 UM_{62}	Reuss	October 20, 2014	Piszkéstető	S. Kürti, K. Sárneczky	·	3.0 km	MPC · JPL
544310	2014 UO_{62}	—	September 16, 2009	Mount Lemmon	Mount Lemmon Survey	·	1.5 km	MPC · JPL
544311	2014 UC_{63}	—	November 6, 2005	Mount Lemmon	Mount Lemmon Survey	HOF	2.3 km	MPC · JPL
544312	2014 UT_{65}	—	April 15, 2008	Kitt Peak	Spacewatch	·	1.7 km	MPC · JPL
544313	2014 UA_{66}	—	June 30, 2008	Kitt Peak	Spacewatch	·	1.7 km	MPC · JPL
544314	2014 UH_{67}	—	October 21, 2014	Kitt Peak	Spacewatch	·	1.2 km	MPC · JPL
544315	2014 UL_{67}	—	October 14, 2009	Kitt Peak	Spacewatch	·	2.4 km	MPC · JPL
544316	2014 UW_{72}	—	September 30, 2005	Mount Lemmon	Mount Lemmon Survey	·	1.9 km	MPC · JPL
544317	2014 UT_{78}	—	March 26, 2007	Mount Lemmon	Mount Lemmon Survey	·	2.2 km	MPC · JPL
544318	2014 UE_{81}	—	April 25, 2003	Kitt Peak	Spacewatch	·	1.7 km	MPC · JPL
544319	2014 UJ_{83}	—	October 3, 2014	Mount Lemmon	Mount Lemmon Survey	EOS	1.4 km	MPC · JPL
544320	2014 UU_{83}	—	September 23, 2005	Kitt Peak	Spacewatch	·	1.3 km	MPC · JPL
544321	2014 UQ_{84}	—	December 5, 2010	Kitt Peak	Spacewatch	·	1.1 km	MPC · JPL
544322	2014 UX_{86}	—	May 24, 2001	Cerro Tololo	Deep Ecliptic Survey	·	1.0 km	MPC · JPL
544323	2014 UZ_{86}	—	November 8, 2010	Mount Lemmon	Mount Lemmon Survey	·	1.3 km	MPC · JPL
544324	2014 UM_{93}	—	May 23, 2006	Kitt Peak	Spacewatch	·	450 m	MPC · JPL
544325 Péczbéla	2014 UR_{94}	Péczbéla	December 4, 2010	Piszkéstető	K. Sárneczky, Z. Kuli	·	1.4 km	MPC · JPL
544326	2014 UY_{95}	—	August 9, 2005	Cerro Tololo	Deep Ecliptic Survey	·	1.4 km	MPC · JPL
544327	2014 UV_{96}	—	October 30, 2005	Mount Lemmon	Mount Lemmon Survey	·	1.3 km	MPC · JPL
544328	2014 UO_{99}	—	August 27, 2009	Catalina	CSS	·	1.9 km	MPC · JPL
544329	2014 UB_{100}	—	September 30, 2006	Kitt Peak	Spacewatch	·	1.8 km	MPC · JPL
544330	2014 UG_{100}	—	July 28, 2009	Kitt Peak	Spacewatch	·	1.7 km	MPC · JPL
544331	2014 UG_{102}	—	August 27, 2009	Kitt Peak	Spacewatch	KOR	1.4 km	MPC · JPL
544332	2014 UT_{102}	—	February 26, 2007	Mount Lemmon	Mount Lemmon Survey	·	2.0 km	MPC · JPL
544333	2014 UW_{102}	—	October 1, 2005	Mount Lemmon	Mount Lemmon Survey	·	1.5 km	MPC · JPL
544334	2014 UH_{103}	—	October 17, 2010	Mount Lemmon	Mount Lemmon Survey	·	950 m	MPC · JPL
544335	2014 UK_{106}	—	November 8, 2009	Mount Lemmon	Mount Lemmon Survey	·	2.2 km	MPC · JPL
544336	2014 UK_{107}	—	September 17, 2009	Mount Lemmon	Mount Lemmon Survey	·	1.5 km	MPC · JPL
544337	2014 UG_{109}	—	March 10, 2003	Palomar	NEAT	(5)	1.5 km	MPC · JPL
544338	2014 UU_{109}	—	September 20, 2003	Palomar	NEAT	·	1.9 km	MPC · JPL
544339	2014 UX_{109}	—	February 14, 2004	Kitt Peak	Spacewatch	·	1.6 km	MPC · JPL
544340	2014 UC_{113}	—	October 25, 2014	Haleakala	Pan-STARRS 1	·	2.1 km	MPC · JPL
544341	2014 UT_{113}	—	October 25, 2005	Mount Lemmon	Mount Lemmon Survey	EUN	1.0 km	MPC · JPL
544342	2014 UE_{116}	—	January 4, 2006	Catalina	CSS	·	3.6 km	MPC · JPL
544343	2014 UA_{117}	—	February 5, 2011	Haleakala	Pan-STARRS 1	·	2.1 km	MPC · JPL
544344	2014 UZ_{117}	—	October 2, 2014	Haleakala	Pan-STARRS 1	·	3.0 km	MPC · JPL
544345	2014 UM_{118}	—	August 29, 2005	Bergisch Gladbach	W. Bickel	·	2.0 km	MPC · JPL
544346	2014 UG_{121}	—	January 20, 2008	Mount Lemmon	Mount Lemmon Survey	·	1.4 km	MPC · JPL
544347	2014 UM_{121}	—	October 3, 2014	Mount Lemmon	Mount Lemmon Survey	·	1.3 km	MPC · JPL
544348	2014 UL_{123}	—	October 22, 2014	Mount Lemmon	Mount Lemmon Survey	·	2.2 km	MPC · JPL
544349	2014 UW_{123}	—	October 22, 2014	Mount Lemmon	Mount Lemmon Survey	EUN	1.1 km	MPC · JPL
544350	2014 UQ_{124}	—	February 26, 2012	Mount Lemmon	Mount Lemmon Survey	·	1.4 km	MPC · JPL
544351	2014 UX_{124}	—	October 22, 2014	Mount Lemmon	Mount Lemmon Survey	·	3.2 km	MPC · JPL
544352	2014 UQ_{125}	—	August 19, 2009	Bergisch Gladbach	W. Bickel	·	2.1 km	MPC · JPL
544353	2014 UQ_{126}	—	January 27, 2007	Kitt Peak	Spacewatch	·	1.5 km	MPC · JPL
544354	2014 UP_{127}	—	June 2, 2008	Mount Lemmon	Mount Lemmon Survey	ELF	4.1 km	MPC · JPL
544355	2014 UY_{131}	—	March 28, 2012	Mount Lemmon	Mount Lemmon Survey	·	1.1 km	MPC · JPL
544356	2014 UB_{135}	—	March 27, 2011	Mount Lemmon	Mount Lemmon Survey	·	1.7 km	MPC · JPL
544357	2014 UF_{137}	—	June 18, 2013	Haleakala	Pan-STARRS 1	·	1.2 km	MPC · JPL
544358	2014 UO_{137}	—	October 25, 2005	Mount Lemmon	Mount Lemmon Survey	·	1.6 km	MPC · JPL
544359	2014 UY_{137}	—	October 3, 2014	Mount Lemmon	Mount Lemmon Survey	·	1.2 km	MPC · JPL
544360	2014 UR_{138}	—	October 17, 2014	Kitt Peak	Spacewatch	EUN	850 m	MPC · JPL
544361	2014 UU_{139}	—	September 30, 2009	Mount Lemmon	Mount Lemmon Survey	·	1.7 km	MPC · JPL
544362	2014 UU_{140}	—	November 9, 2009	Mount Lemmon	Mount Lemmon Survey	EOS	1.8 km	MPC · JPL
544363	2014 UC_{142}	—	October 17, 2014	Kitt Peak	Spacewatch	·	1.4 km	MPC · JPL
544364	2014 UF_{142}	—	October 25, 2014	Kitt Peak	Spacewatch	·	1.7 km	MPC · JPL
544365	2014 UQ_{142}	—	July 15, 2005	Kitt Peak	Spacewatch	·	1.1 km	MPC · JPL
544366	2014 UZ_{143}	—	October 18, 2001	Palomar	NEAT	·	1.7 km	MPC · JPL
544367	2014 UT_{146}	—	October 25, 2014	Mount Lemmon	Mount Lemmon Survey	·	910 m	MPC · JPL
544368	2014 UH_{147}	—	October 21, 2006	Mount Lemmon	Mount Lemmon Survey	·	1.1 km	MPC · JPL
544369	2014 UG_{152}	—	November 24, 2006	Kitt Peak	Spacewatch	·	960 m	MPC · JPL
544370	2014 UZ_{153}	—	April 21, 2009	Mount Lemmon	Mount Lemmon Survey	·	1.1 km	MPC · JPL
544371	2014 US_{155}	—	August 18, 2009	Kitt Peak	Spacewatch	·	1.9 km	MPC · JPL
544372	2014 UZ_{155}	—	August 29, 2005	Kitt Peak	Spacewatch	·	1.3 km	MPC · JPL
544373	2014 UH_{156}	—	October 20, 2003	Palomar	NEAT	·	3.2 km	MPC · JPL
544374	2014 UK_{156}	—	October 25, 2014	Kitt Peak	Spacewatch	·	1.3 km	MPC · JPL
544375	2014 UK_{157}	—	August 10, 2005	Cerro Tololo	Deep Ecliptic Survey	·	1.3 km	MPC · JPL
544376	2014 UP_{158}	—	October 25, 2014	Haleakala	Pan-STARRS 1	·	1.4 km	MPC · JPL
544377	2014 UH_{160}	—	October 25, 2014	Haleakala	Pan-STARRS 1	·	1.6 km	MPC · JPL
544378	2014 UD_{161}	—	October 25, 2014	Haleakala	Pan-STARRS 1	·	1.5 km	MPC · JPL
544379	2014 UE_{162}	—	October 25, 2014	Haleakala	Pan-STARRS 1	·	1.4 km	MPC · JPL
544380	2014 UC_{163}	—	November 23, 2009	Kitt Peak	Spacewatch	·	1.4 km	MPC · JPL
544381	2014 UZ_{164}	—	September 16, 2009	Mount Lemmon	Mount Lemmon Survey	·	1.4 km	MPC · JPL
544382	2014 UL_{165}	—	September 21, 2001	Kitt Peak	Spacewatch	ADE	2.1 km	MPC · JPL
544383	2014 UV_{165}	—	October 26, 2014	Mount Lemmon	Mount Lemmon Survey	·	1.4 km	MPC · JPL
544384	2014 UC_{166}	—	December 5, 2010	Mount Lemmon	Mount Lemmon Survey	·	1.5 km	MPC · JPL
544385	2014 UB_{168}	—	December 2, 2010	Kitt Peak	Spacewatch	·	2.2 km	MPC · JPL
544386	2014 UR_{170}	—	September 27, 2003	Kitt Peak	Spacewatch	·	3.5 km	MPC · JPL
544387	2014 UY_{171}	—	October 28, 2014	Mount Lemmon	Mount Lemmon Survey	·	950 m	MPC · JPL
544388	2014 UB_{173}	—	September 1, 2005	Kitt Peak	Spacewatch	·	1.2 km	MPC · JPL
544389	2014 UF_{173}	—	July 15, 2013	Mauna Kea	R. J. Wainscoat, M. Micheli	·	2.6 km	MPC · JPL
544390	2014 UM_{173}	—	October 28, 2014	Mount Lemmon	Mount Lemmon Survey	·	1.3 km	MPC · JPL
544391	2014 UM_{176}	—	September 25, 2014	Kitt Peak	Spacewatch	·	2.0 km	MPC · JPL
544392	2014 UZ_{179}	—	October 25, 2014	Mount Lemmon	Mount Lemmon Survey	·	1.3 km	MPC · JPL
544393	2014 UK_{182}	—	April 27, 2012	Haleakala	Pan-STARRS 1	·	1.3 km	MPC · JPL
544394	2014 UJ_{183}	—	October 22, 2006	Kitt Peak	Spacewatch	·	1.0 km	MPC · JPL
544395	2014 UG_{185}	—	August 23, 2014	Haleakala	Pan-STARRS 1	·	1.3 km	MPC · JPL
544396	2014 UT_{185}	—	October 14, 2004	Palomar	NEAT	·	3.2 km	MPC · JPL
544397	2014 UW_{185}	—	October 3, 2014	Mount Lemmon	Mount Lemmon Survey	·	1.1 km	MPC · JPL
544398	2014 UT_{195}	—	May 27, 2009	Mount Lemmon	Mount Lemmon Survey	·	1.2 km	MPC · JPL
544399	2014 UO_{197}	—	August 30, 2005	Kitt Peak	Spacewatch	·	1.1 km	MPC · JPL
544400	2014 UJ_{198}	—	October 7, 2008	Mount Lemmon	Mount Lemmon Survey	·	3.4 km	MPC · JPL

== 544401–544500 ==
back to top

Designation			Discovery			Properties		Ref
Permanent	Provisional	Named after	Date	Site	Discoverer(s)	Category	Diam.	Ref
544401	2014 UN_{199}	—	October 10, 2008	Mount Lemmon	Mount Lemmon Survey	·	3.8 km	MPC · JPL
544402	2014 UZ_{199}	—	October 27, 2014	Haleakala	Pan-STARRS 1	HNS	1.1 km	MPC · JPL
544403	2014 UZ_{201}	—	November 5, 2010	Kitt Peak	Spacewatch	·	1.5 km	MPC · JPL
544404	2014 UL_{202}	—	July 2, 2013	Haleakala	Pan-STARRS 1	·	2.1 km	MPC · JPL
544405	2014 UY_{202}	—	December 1, 1996	Kitt Peak	Spacewatch	·	1.4 km	MPC · JPL
544406	2014 UK_{203}	—	October 24, 1998	Kitt Peak	Spacewatch	EOS	2.2 km	MPC · JPL
544407	2014 UB_{207}	—	October 27, 2005	Palomar	NEAT	NEM	2.4 km	MPC · JPL
544408	2014 UM_{207}	—	November 12, 2010	Kitt Peak	Spacewatch	·	1.4 km	MPC · JPL
544409	2014 UF_{209}	—	September 4, 2014	Haleakala	Pan-STARRS 1	·	1.5 km	MPC · JPL
544410	2014 UO_{211}	—	December 11, 2009	Mount Lemmon	Mount Lemmon Survey	·	1.5 km	MPC · JPL
544411	2014 UA_{212}	—	February 20, 2012	Haleakala	Pan-STARRS 1	·	1.7 km	MPC · JPL
544412	2014 UD_{212}	—	October 28, 2006	Catalina	CSS	·	1.1 km	MPC · JPL
544413	2014 US_{212}	—	July 24, 2003	Palomar	NEAT	·	2.6 km	MPC · JPL
544414	2014 UX_{212}	—	August 30, 2014	La Sagra	OAM	·	1.6 km	MPC · JPL
544415	2014 UP_{214}	—	October 28, 2014	Haleakala	Pan-STARRS 1	·	1.7 km	MPC · JPL
544416	2014 UD_{216}	—	December 4, 2010	Mount Lemmon	Mount Lemmon Survey	·	2.9 km	MPC · JPL
544417	2014 UL_{216}	—	December 11, 2009	Tzec Maun	D. Chestnov, A. Novichonok	·	3.7 km	MPC · JPL
544418	2014 UQ_{217}	—	April 17, 2012	Kitt Peak	Spacewatch	EOS	2.4 km	MPC · JPL
544419	2014 UU_{217}	—	October 14, 2004	Palomar	NEAT	·	2.0 km	MPC · JPL
544420	2014 UO_{218}	—	January 27, 2012	Kitt Peak	Spacewatch	·	1.4 km	MPC · JPL
544421	2014 UD_{219}	—	September 1, 2005	Palomar	NEAT	·	2.0 km	MPC · JPL
544422	2014 UF_{219}	—	August 5, 2005	Palomar	NEAT	·	1.7 km	MPC · JPL
544423	2014 UJ_{219}	—	August 30, 2014	Mount Lemmon	Mount Lemmon Survey	·	1.5 km	MPC · JPL
544424	2014 UA_{220}	—	August 25, 2005	Campo Imperatore	CINEOS	·	2.1 km	MPC · JPL
544425	2014 UU_{220}	—	February 7, 2011	Mount Lemmon	Mount Lemmon Survey	·	2.4 km	MPC · JPL
544426	2014 UH_{221}	—	October 14, 2009	Catalina	CSS	EOS	1.9 km	MPC · JPL
544427	2014 UL_{221}	—	September 20, 2014	Catalina	CSS	·	1.8 km	MPC · JPL
544428	2014 UR_{221}	—	November 9, 2009	Kitt Peak	Spacewatch	EOS	1.8 km	MPC · JPL
544429	2014 UU_{223}	—	August 22, 2014	Haleakala	Pan-STARRS 1	·	2.3 km	MPC · JPL
544430	2014 UW_{224}	—	October 28, 2014	Haleakala	Pan-STARRS 1	res · 2:5	166 km	MPC · JPL
544431	2014 UT_{225}	—	October 20, 2014	Mount Lemmon	Mount Lemmon Survey	H	500 m	MPC · JPL
544432	2014 UD_{226}	—	October 18, 2014	Mount Lemmon	Mount Lemmon Survey	H	510 m	MPC · JPL
544433	2014 UO_{227}	—	May 29, 2012	Mount Lemmon	Mount Lemmon Survey	EOS	1.6 km	MPC · JPL
544434	2014 UW_{227}	—	January 14, 2011	Kitt Peak	Spacewatch	·	1.5 km	MPC · JPL
544435	2014 UF_{230}	—	December 5, 2010	Mount Lemmon	Mount Lemmon Survey	·	1.4 km	MPC · JPL
544436	2014 UO_{230}	—	October 26, 2014	Mount Lemmon	Mount Lemmon Survey	·	1.3 km	MPC · JPL
544437	2014 UH_{231}	—	October 28, 2014	Haleakala	Pan-STARRS 1	LIX	3.1 km	MPC · JPL
544438	2014 UE_{232}	—	September 30, 2014	Mount Lemmon	Mount Lemmon Survey	·	1.2 km	MPC · JPL
544439	2014 UJ_{232}	—	November 9, 2009	Mount Lemmon	Mount Lemmon Survey	·	1.4 km	MPC · JPL
544440	2014 UO_{232}	—	October 18, 2001	Kitt Peak	Spacewatch	EUN	1.0 km	MPC · JPL
544441	2014 UV_{232}	—	March 1, 2012	Mount Lemmon	Mount Lemmon Survey	·	2.4 km	MPC · JPL
544442	2014 UF_{233}	—	October 26, 2014	Mount Lemmon	Mount Lemmon Survey	·	1.6 km	MPC · JPL
544443	2014 UG_{233}	—	January 31, 2012	Haleakala	Pan-STARRS 1	·	2.3 km	MPC · JPL
544444	2014 UH_{233}	—	November 6, 2005	Mount Lemmon	Mount Lemmon Survey	HOF	3.2 km	MPC · JPL
544445	2014 UJ_{234}	—	April 15, 2012	Haleakala	Pan-STARRS 1	·	1.3 km	MPC · JPL
544446	2014 UJ_{235}	—	October 24, 2014	Mount Lemmon	Mount Lemmon Survey	·	3.9 km	MPC · JPL
544447	2014 UX_{235}	—	October 6, 2005	Kitt Peak	Spacewatch	·	1.3 km	MPC · JPL
544448	2014 UV_{236}	—	October 26, 2014	Mount Lemmon	Mount Lemmon Survey	·	1.2 km	MPC · JPL
544449	2014 UF_{239}	—	September 26, 2009	Kitt Peak	Spacewatch	·	1.9 km	MPC · JPL
544450	2014 UR_{240}	—	October 30, 2014	Haleakala	Pan-STARRS 1	·	1.4 km	MPC · JPL
544451	2014 UZ_{245}	—	October 26, 2014	Mount Lemmon	Mount Lemmon Survey	MAR	1.0 km	MPC · JPL
544452	2014 VN_{3}	—	November 27, 2006	Mount Lemmon	Mount Lemmon Survey	·	1.3 km	MPC · JPL
544453	2014 VH_{5}	—	September 27, 2009	Mount Lemmon	Mount Lemmon Survey	·	2.3 km	MPC · JPL
544454	2014 VJ_{5}	—	December 13, 2010	Mount Lemmon	Mount Lemmon Survey	·	1.6 km	MPC · JPL
544455	2014 VR_{5}	—	August 23, 2014	Haleakala	Pan-STARRS 1	·	1.5 km	MPC · JPL
544456	2014 VD_{6}	—	July 9, 2003	Kitt Peak	Spacewatch	·	2.3 km	MPC · JPL
544457	2014 VK_{9}	—	April 30, 2012	Kitt Peak	Spacewatch	·	1.6 km	MPC · JPL
544458	2014 VE_{11}	—	September 18, 2003	Kitt Peak	Spacewatch	·	2.7 km	MPC · JPL
544459	2014 VM_{15}	—	October 25, 2014	Haleakala	Pan-STARRS 1	·	2.5 km	MPC · JPL
544460	2014 VJ_{16}	—	June 4, 2003	Kitt Peak	Spacewatch	·	3.0 km	MPC · JPL
544461	2014 VF_{18}	—	October 28, 1995	Kitt Peak	Spacewatch	·	1.6 km	MPC · JPL
544462	2014 VY_{18}	—	February 10, 2008	Mount Lemmon	Mount Lemmon Survey	HNS	1.1 km	MPC · JPL
544463	2014 VN_{20}	—	May 26, 2007	Mount Lemmon	Mount Lemmon Survey	EUP	2.6 km	MPC · JPL
544464	2014 VV_{20}	—	October 19, 2014	Kitt Peak	Spacewatch	·	1.7 km	MPC · JPL
544465	2014 VA_{21}	—	December 31, 2005	Kitt Peak	Spacewatch	AGN	1.0 km	MPC · JPL
544466	2014 VH_{23}	—	September 1, 2005	Palomar	NEAT	·	2.0 km	MPC · JPL
544467	2014 VN_{23}	—	November 4, 2014	Mount Lemmon	Mount Lemmon Survey	·	2.0 km	MPC · JPL
544468	2014 VU_{23}	—	December 14, 2010	Mount Lemmon	Mount Lemmon Survey	·	1.5 km	MPC · JPL
544469	2014 VX_{23}	—	November 12, 2014	Haleakala	Pan-STARRS 1	·	2.7 km	MPC · JPL
544470	2014 VR_{24}	—	November 12, 2014	Haleakala	Pan-STARRS 1	·	2.7 km	MPC · JPL
544471	2014 VD_{25}	—	September 10, 2013	Haleakala	Pan-STARRS 1	·	2.6 km	MPC · JPL
544472	2014 VE_{25}	—	November 29, 2005	Kitt Peak	Spacewatch	·	1.6 km	MPC · JPL
544473	2014 VS_{25}	—	October 4, 2014	Mount Lemmon	Mount Lemmon Survey	·	1.6 km	MPC · JPL
544474	2014 VY_{25}	—	October 20, 2003	Palomar	NEAT	EOS	2.2 km	MPC · JPL
544475	2014 VS_{26}	—	August 27, 2003	Haleakala	NEAT	·	2.2 km	MPC · JPL
544476	2014 VF_{31}	—	October 26, 2005	Kitt Peak	Spacewatch	·	1.3 km	MPC · JPL
544477	2014 VV_{31}	—	March 6, 2011	Mount Lemmon	Mount Lemmon Survey	·	1.6 km	MPC · JPL
544478	2014 VW_{32}	—	November 14, 2014	Kitt Peak	Spacewatch	(18466)	2.1 km	MPC · JPL
544479	2014 VC_{33}	—	January 29, 2011	Mount Lemmon	Mount Lemmon Survey	·	1.4 km	MPC · JPL
544480	2014 VR_{33}	—	October 11, 2005	Kitt Peak	Spacewatch	·	1.3 km	MPC · JPL
544481	2014 VZ_{36}	—	July 5, 2013	Bergisch Gladbach	W. Bickel	·	1.1 km	MPC · JPL
544482	2014 VG_{38}	—	August 28, 2003	Palomar	NEAT	·	1.7 km	MPC · JPL
544483	2014 VA_{39}	—	August 31, 2005	Palomar	NEAT	·	1.4 km	MPC · JPL
544484	2014 VC_{39}	—	November 4, 2014	Mount Lemmon	Mount Lemmon Survey	·	1.9 km	MPC · JPL
544485	2014 WY_{3}	—	November 16, 2014	Mount Lemmon	Mount Lemmon Survey	·	2.3 km	MPC · JPL
544486	2014 WL_{4}	—	November 6, 2005	Mount Lemmon	Mount Lemmon Survey	·	1.3 km	MPC · JPL
544487	2014 WV_{5}	—	April 11, 2008	Catalina	CSS	H	530 m	MPC · JPL
544488	2014 WO_{8}	—	October 5, 2005	Mount Lemmon	Mount Lemmon Survey	·	1.2 km	MPC · JPL
544489	2014 WW_{14}	—	September 12, 2005	Kitt Peak	Spacewatch	·	1.1 km	MPC · JPL
544490	2014 WW_{15}	—	March 16, 2004	Kitt Peak	Spacewatch	·	1.3 km	MPC · JPL
544491	2014 WM_{17}	—	August 15, 2013	Haleakala	Pan-STARRS 1	·	1.5 km	MPC · JPL
544492	2014 WO_{17}	—	November 16, 2014	Mount Lemmon	Mount Lemmon Survey	·	1.7 km	MPC · JPL
544493	2014 WT_{18}	—	October 17, 2009	Mount Lemmon	Mount Lemmon Survey	·	1.5 km	MPC · JPL
544494	2014 WG_{25}	—	December 3, 2010	Mount Lemmon	Mount Lemmon Survey	·	1.0 km	MPC · JPL
544495	2014 WO_{26}	—	March 29, 2004	Kitt Peak	Spacewatch	·	1.1 km	MPC · JPL
544496	2014 WB_{27}	—	October 25, 2014	Haleakala	Pan-STARRS 1	BRG	1.2 km	MPC · JPL
544497	2014 WC_{28}	—	October 27, 2005	Mount Lemmon	Mount Lemmon Survey	·	1.2 km	MPC · JPL
544498	2014 WT_{28}	—	November 25, 2005	Mount Lemmon	Mount Lemmon Survey	·	1.6 km	MPC · JPL
544499	2014 WS_{31}	—	November 22, 2006	Mount Lemmon	Mount Lemmon Survey	·	1.7 km	MPC · JPL
544500	2014 WX_{31}	—	October 24, 2008	Kitt Peak	Spacewatch	·	3.7 km	MPC · JPL

== 544501–544600 ==
back to top

Designation			Discovery			Properties		Ref
Permanent	Provisional	Named after	Date	Site	Discoverer(s)	Category	Diam.	Ref
544501	2014 WB_{33}	—	February 13, 2007	Mount Lemmon	Mount Lemmon Survey	·	1.7 km	MPC · JPL
544502	2014 WZ_{33}	—	October 11, 2010	Mount Lemmon	Mount Lemmon Survey	EUN	1.2 km	MPC · JPL
544503	2014 WE_{35}	—	November 11, 2009	Kitt Peak	Spacewatch	·	1.5 km	MPC · JPL
544504	2014 WJ_{35}	—	July 4, 2005	Kitt Peak	Spacewatch	·	1.3 km	MPC · JPL
544505	2014 WR_{36}	—	November 8, 2009	Mount Lemmon	Mount Lemmon Survey	·	1.7 km	MPC · JPL
544506	2014 WC_{37}	—	February 27, 2012	Haleakala	Pan-STARRS 1	·	1.3 km	MPC · JPL
544507	2014 WH_{37}	—	July 16, 2013	Haleakala	Pan-STARRS 1	(31811)	3.1 km	MPC · JPL
544508	2014 WZ_{39}	—	February 27, 2012	Haleakala	Pan-STARRS 1	·	1.4 km	MPC · JPL
544509	2014 WM_{40}	—	September 14, 2005	Kitt Peak	Spacewatch	·	1.5 km	MPC · JPL
544510	2014 WQ_{40}	—	October 25, 2014	Haleakala	Pan-STARRS 1	·	1.7 km	MPC · JPL
544511	2014 WU_{40}	—	December 20, 2009	Mount Lemmon	Mount Lemmon Survey	·	2.1 km	MPC · JPL
544512	2014 WZ_{40}	—	July 2, 2013	Haleakala	Pan-STARRS 1	·	1.9 km	MPC · JPL
544513	2014 WB_{41}	—	December 7, 2001	Kitt Peak	Spacewatch	NEM	2.4 km	MPC · JPL
544514	2014 WV_{47}	—	November 10, 2009	Kitt Peak	Spacewatch	·	1.3 km	MPC · JPL
544515	2014 WB_{48}	—	November 9, 2009	Mount Lemmon	Mount Lemmon Survey	·	1.6 km	MPC · JPL
544516	2014 WK_{48}	—	February 2, 2005	Kitt Peak	Spacewatch	·	1.3 km	MPC · JPL
544517	2014 WC_{49}	—	November 14, 2010	Mount Lemmon	Mount Lemmon Survey	·	1.3 km	MPC · JPL
544518	2014 WN_{50}	—	May 16, 2013	Haleakala	Pan-STARRS 1	·	1.0 km	MPC · JPL
544519	2014 WE_{51}	—	December 14, 2010	Mount Lemmon	Mount Lemmon Survey	·	1.2 km	MPC · JPL
544520	2014 WC_{52}	—	December 14, 2006	Palomar	NEAT	EUN	1.5 km	MPC · JPL
544521	2014 WB_{53}	—	November 9, 2009	Mount Lemmon	Mount Lemmon Survey	·	2.0 km	MPC · JPL
544522	2014 WD_{54}	—	December 3, 2010	Mount Lemmon	Mount Lemmon Survey	·	1.2 km	MPC · JPL
544523	2014 WK_{54}	—	December 28, 2005	Mount Lemmon	Mount Lemmon Survey	MRX	890 m	MPC · JPL
544524	2014 WN_{55}	—	November 12, 2014	Haleakala	Pan-STARRS 1	·	2.9 km	MPC · JPL
544525	2014 WG_{56}	—	November 20, 2009	Kitt Peak	Spacewatch	·	1.4 km	MPC · JPL
544526	2014 WJ_{56}	—	November 19, 2006	Kitt Peak	Spacewatch	EUN	1.0 km	MPC · JPL
544527	2014 WF_{58}	—	November 16, 2009	Mount Lemmon	Mount Lemmon Survey	·	1.8 km	MPC · JPL
544528	2014 WK_{59}	—	September 25, 2014	Mount Lemmon	Mount Lemmon Survey	·	2.1 km	MPC · JPL
544529	2014 WB_{61}	—	September 25, 2005	Kitt Peak	Spacewatch	·	1.5 km	MPC · JPL
544530	2014 WU_{61}	—	July 16, 2013	Haleakala	Pan-STARRS 1	·	1.2 km	MPC · JPL
544531	2014 WB_{62}	—	October 22, 2014	Kitt Peak	Spacewatch	·	1.4 km	MPC · JPL
544532	2014 WK_{63}	—	November 1, 2010	Kitt Peak	Spacewatch	(5)	940 m	MPC · JPL
544533	2014 WO_{63}	—	July 5, 2005	Mount Lemmon	Mount Lemmon Survey	·	990 m	MPC · JPL
544534	2014 WG_{64}	—	May 1, 2003	Kitt Peak	Spacewatch	·	1.9 km	MPC · JPL
544535	2014 WY_{66}	—	November 6, 2005	Pla D'Arguines	R. Ferrando, Ferrando, M.	·	2.0 km	MPC · JPL
544536	2014 WY_{69}	—	November 19, 2014	Catalina	CSS	H	410 m	MPC · JPL
544537	2014 WA_{72}	—	December 25, 2010	Mount Lemmon	Mount Lemmon Survey	·	1.4 km	MPC · JPL
544538	2014 WL_{72}	—	November 16, 2014	Kitt Peak	Spacewatch	BRG	1.5 km	MPC · JPL
544539	2014 WX_{72}	—	January 27, 2011	Mount Lemmon	Mount Lemmon Survey	EOS	2.0 km	MPC · JPL
544540	2014 WM_{73}	—	March 26, 2008	Mount Lemmon	Mount Lemmon Survey	·	1.1 km	MPC · JPL
544541 Srholec	2014 WP_{73}	Srholec	March 24, 2011	Piszkéstető	S. Kürti, K. Sárneczky	·	2.1 km	MPC · JPL
544542	2014 WF_{77}	—	April 12, 2008	Mount Lemmon	Mount Lemmon Survey	·	1.2 km	MPC · JPL
544543	2014 WF_{82}	—	October 25, 2014	Haleakala	Pan-STARRS 1	·	1.3 km	MPC · JPL
544544	2014 WS_{83}	—	January 26, 2007	Kitt Peak	Spacewatch	·	1.1 km	MPC · JPL
544545	2014 WL_{91}	—	November 17, 2014	Mount Lemmon	Mount Lemmon Survey	·	1.4 km	MPC · JPL
544546	2014 WK_{94}	—	December 3, 2010	Kitt Peak	Spacewatch	·	1.4 km	MPC · JPL
544547	2014 WU_{95}	—	November 17, 2014	Mount Lemmon	Mount Lemmon Survey	·	1.1 km	MPC · JPL
544548	2014 WP_{104}	—	August 22, 2014	Haleakala	Pan-STARRS 1	·	1.6 km	MPC · JPL
544549	2014 WT_{105}	—	September 23, 2005	Kitt Peak	Spacewatch	·	1.4 km	MPC · JPL
544550	2014 WM_{106}	—	October 28, 2014	Haleakala	Pan-STARRS 1	·	2.2 km	MPC · JPL
544551	2014 WB_{109}	—	August 31, 2014	Haleakala	Pan-STARRS 1	EOS	1.7 km	MPC · JPL
544552	2014 WW_{112}	—	September 24, 2005	Kitt Peak	Spacewatch	·	1.6 km	MPC · JPL
544553	2014 WE_{113}	—	October 30, 2010	Kitt Peak	Spacewatch	·	2.5 km	MPC · JPL
544554	2014 WR_{114}	—	May 27, 2009	Mount Lemmon	Mount Lemmon Survey	·	2.7 km	MPC · JPL
544555	2014 WT_{114}	—	December 3, 2010	Kitt Peak	Spacewatch	·	1.6 km	MPC · JPL
544556	2014 WD_{115}	—	February 24, 2012	Kitt Peak	Spacewatch	·	1.6 km	MPC · JPL
544557	2014 WR_{117}	—	July 3, 2014	Haleakala	Pan-STARRS 1	H	580 m	MPC · JPL
544558	2014 WG_{118}	—	October 29, 2014	Haleakala	Pan-STARRS 1	EUN	990 m	MPC · JPL
544559	2014 WC_{120}	—	November 3, 2014	Mount Lemmon	Mount Lemmon Survey	H	470 m	MPC · JPL
544560	2014 WR_{120}	—	July 26, 2011	Haleakala	Pan-STARRS 1	H	510 m	MPC · JPL
544561	2014 WL_{121}	—	March 24, 2011	Piszkés-tető	K. Sárneczky, Z. Kuli	·	1.5 km	MPC · JPL
544562	2014 WR_{121}	—	October 12, 2005	Kitt Peak	Spacewatch	·	1.6 km	MPC · JPL
544563	2014 WW_{122}	—	November 16, 2014	Kitt Peak	Spacewatch	EOS	1.5 km	MPC · JPL
544564	2014 WC_{124}	—	September 25, 2009	Kitt Peak	Spacewatch	·	1.7 km	MPC · JPL
544565	2014 WO_{124}	—	March 14, 2011	Mount Lemmon	Mount Lemmon Survey	·	1.6 km	MPC · JPL
544566	2014 WF_{125}	—	July 31, 2005	Palomar	NEAT	·	1.7 km	MPC · JPL
544567	2014 WR_{127}	—	March 24, 2011	Piszkés-tető	K. Sárneczky, Z. Kuli	TEL	1.2 km	MPC · JPL
544568	2014 WW_{127}	—	October 25, 2005	Catalina	CSS	·	1.7 km	MPC · JPL
544569	2014 WA_{128}	—	October 8, 2008	Mount Lemmon	Mount Lemmon Survey	·	2.4 km	MPC · JPL
544570	2014 WJ_{128}	—	October 11, 2010	Kitt Peak	Spacewatch	·	1.8 km	MPC · JPL
544571	2014 WP_{128}	—	March 9, 2011	Mount Lemmon	Mount Lemmon Survey	·	1.9 km	MPC · JPL
544572	2014 WL_{129}	—	September 23, 2014	Haleakala	Pan-STARRS 1	·	1.5 km	MPC · JPL
544573	2014 WG_{132}	—	November 25, 2005	Mount Lemmon	Mount Lemmon Survey	·	1.4 km	MPC · JPL
544574	2014 WX_{138}	—	July 13, 2013	Mount Lemmon	Mount Lemmon Survey	·	1.6 km	MPC · JPL
544575	2014 WA_{139}	—	October 21, 2014	Kitt Peak	Spacewatch	·	1.8 km	MPC · JPL
544576	2014 WQ_{139}	—	November 24, 2009	Kitt Peak	Spacewatch	H	310 m	MPC · JPL
544577	2014 WS_{144}	—	July 6, 2005	Kitt Peak	Spacewatch	·	1.3 km	MPC · JPL
544578	2014 WW_{144}	—	February 12, 2011	Mount Lemmon	Mount Lemmon Survey	·	1.6 km	MPC · JPL
544579	2014 WM_{145}	—	December 8, 1996	Kitt Peak	Spacewatch	·	1.9 km	MPC · JPL
544580	2014 WD_{146}	—	August 31, 2014	Haleakala	Pan-STARRS 1	MAR	720 m	MPC · JPL
544581	2014 WL_{151}	—	November 3, 2010	Mount Lemmon	Mount Lemmon Survey	KON	2.3 km	MPC · JPL
544582	2014 WP_{151}	—	May 30, 2006	Mount Lemmon	Mount Lemmon Survey	NYS	1.3 km	MPC · JPL
544583	2014 WT_{152}	—	April 20, 2012	Mount Lemmon	Mount Lemmon Survey	KOR	1.1 km	MPC · JPL
544584	2014 WD_{153}	—	October 16, 2009	Mount Lemmon	Mount Lemmon Survey	·	1.6 km	MPC · JPL
544585	2014 WK_{155}	—	March 17, 2007	Kitt Peak	Spacewatch	KOR	1.3 km	MPC · JPL
544586	2014 WZ_{157}	—	November 8, 2010	Mount Lemmon	Mount Lemmon Survey	·	1.0 km	MPC · JPL
544587	2014 WO_{158}	—	April 14, 2008	Kitt Peak	Spacewatch	·	1.9 km	MPC · JPL
544588	2014 WO_{161}	—	March 4, 1997	Kitt Peak	Spacewatch	·	1.6 km	MPC · JPL
544589	2014 WQ_{161}	—	October 15, 2001	Palomar	NEAT	·	1.5 km	MPC · JPL
544590	2014 WB_{163}	—	September 3, 2008	Kitt Peak	Spacewatch	EOS	1.6 km	MPC · JPL
544591	2014 WJ_{164}	—	December 6, 2010	Kitt Peak	Spacewatch	·	1.2 km	MPC · JPL
544592	2014 WT_{164}	—	April 4, 1995	Kitt Peak	Spacewatch	·	1.5 km	MPC · JPL
544593	2014 WJ_{165}	—	May 20, 2012	Haleakala	Pan-STARRS 1	EOS	1.4 km	MPC · JPL
544594	2014 WM_{165}	—	November 22, 2005	Kitt Peak	Spacewatch	·	1.4 km	MPC · JPL
544595	2014 WA_{167}	—	March 28, 2008	Kitt Peak	Spacewatch	·	1.3 km	MPC · JPL
544596	2014 WH_{169}	—	February 13, 2008	Kitt Peak	Spacewatch	·	860 m	MPC · JPL
544597	2014 WL_{169}	—	October 26, 2005	Kitt Peak	Spacewatch	·	2.1 km	MPC · JPL
544598	2014 WF_{172}	—	August 11, 2010	Kitt Peak	Spacewatch	JUN	1.0 km	MPC · JPL
544599	2014 WM_{172}	—	August 25, 2014	Haleakala	Pan-STARRS 1	·	2.1 km	MPC · JPL
544600	2014 WD_{174}	—	March 1, 2011	Mount Lemmon	Mount Lemmon Survey	EOS	1.5 km	MPC · JPL

== 544601–544700 ==
back to top

Designation			Discovery			Properties		Ref
Permanent	Provisional	Named after	Date	Site	Discoverer(s)	Category	Diam.	Ref
544601	2014 WR_{175}	—	September 23, 2014	Haleakala	Pan-STARRS 1	·	1.1 km	MPC · JPL
544602	2014 WF_{176}	—	October 25, 2014	Haleakala	Pan-STARRS 1	EUN	820 m	MPC · JPL
544603	2014 WG_{176}	—	November 4, 2005	Mount Lemmon	Mount Lemmon Survey	·	2.0 km	MPC · JPL
544604	2014 WR_{176}	—	February 9, 1999	Kitt Peak	Spacewatch	·	1.0 km	MPC · JPL
544605	2014 WY_{176}	—	August 30, 2014	Haleakala	Pan-STARRS 1	·	1.3 km	MPC · JPL
544606	2014 WK_{179}	—	February 13, 2011	Mount Lemmon	Mount Lemmon Survey	·	1.5 km	MPC · JPL
544607	2014 WL_{182}	—	September 24, 2014	Haleakala	Pan-STARRS 1	BRA	1.3 km	MPC · JPL
544608	2014 WA_{184}	—	April 4, 2011	Mount Lemmon	Mount Lemmon Survey	·	3.3 km	MPC · JPL
544609	2014 WH_{184}	—	November 20, 2014	Mount Lemmon	Mount Lemmon Survey	·	2.8 km	MPC · JPL
544610	2014 WH_{185}	—	October 2, 2013	Mount Lemmon	Mount Lemmon Survey	·	2.5 km	MPC · JPL
544611	2014 WD_{186}	—	October 28, 2008	Kitt Peak	Spacewatch	·	2.8 km	MPC · JPL
544612	2014 WW_{186}	—	March 27, 2008	Mount Lemmon	Mount Lemmon Survey	·	2.0 km	MPC · JPL
544613	2014 WE_{188}	—	October 12, 2009	Mount Lemmon	Mount Lemmon Survey	·	1.7 km	MPC · JPL
544614	2014 WL_{189}	—	September 20, 2014	Haleakala	Pan-STARRS 1	·	1.6 km	MPC · JPL
544615	2014 WS_{192}	—	September 30, 2005	Mount Lemmon	Mount Lemmon Survey	·	970 m	MPC · JPL
544616	2014 WX_{192}	—	July 2, 2013	Haleakala	Pan-STARRS 1	·	1.5 km	MPC · JPL
544617	2014 WM_{193}	—	January 13, 2011	Kitt Peak	Spacewatch	·	1.5 km	MPC · JPL
544618 Bugátpál	2014 WP_{193}	Bugátpál	October 29, 2014	Piszkéstető	K. Sárneczky, P. Székely	·	1.4 km	MPC · JPL
544619	2014 WP_{194}	—	September 29, 2005	Catalina	CSS	·	1.3 km	MPC · JPL
544620	2014 WC_{195}	—	October 30, 2010	Mount Lemmon	Mount Lemmon Survey	EUN	1.2 km	MPC · JPL
544621	2014 WK_{195}	—	November 21, 2014	Mount Lemmon	Mount Lemmon Survey	HNS	840 m	MPC · JPL
544622	2014 WS_{195}	—	October 30, 2014	Mount Lemmon	Mount Lemmon Survey	EOS	1.6 km	MPC · JPL
544623	2014 WO_{196}	—	January 29, 2011	Mount Lemmon	Mount Lemmon Survey	PAD	1.4 km	MPC · JPL
544624	2014 WD_{197}	—	June 15, 2013	Mount Lemmon	Mount Lemmon Survey	·	3.2 km	MPC · JPL
544625	2014 WF_{197}	—	February 25, 2007	Mount Lemmon	Mount Lemmon Survey	·	1.6 km	MPC · JPL
544626	2014 WE_{199}	—	February 13, 2011	Mount Lemmon	Mount Lemmon Survey	DOR	1.7 km	MPC · JPL
544627	2014 WU_{204}	—	August 6, 2005	Palomar	NEAT	·	1.6 km	MPC · JPL
544628	2014 WC_{207}	—	October 6, 2005	Mount Lemmon	Mount Lemmon Survey	·	1.3 km	MPC · JPL
544629	2014 WO_{209}	—	March 21, 2012	Mount Lemmon	Mount Lemmon Survey	·	1.3 km	MPC · JPL
544630	2014 WB_{211}	—	February 5, 2011	Mount Lemmon	Mount Lemmon Survey	·	1.7 km	MPC · JPL
544631	2014 WG_{211}	—	October 29, 2001	Palomar	NEAT	·	1.7 km	MPC · JPL
544632	2014 WF_{212}	—	January 27, 2007	Kitt Peak	Spacewatch	·	1.1 km	MPC · JPL
544633	2014 WP_{212}	—	June 12, 2004	Kitt Peak	Spacewatch	EUN	1.3 km	MPC · JPL
544634	2014 WF_{215}	—	October 30, 2005	Mount Lemmon	Mount Lemmon Survey	·	2.2 km	MPC · JPL
544635	2014 WL_{215}	—	October 28, 2014	Haleakala	Pan-STARRS 1	PAD	1.5 km	MPC · JPL
544636	2014 WE_{218}	—	April 6, 2008	Kitt Peak	Spacewatch	·	1.1 km	MPC · JPL
544637	2014 WB_{221}	—	August 31, 2005	Kitt Peak	Spacewatch	·	1.1 km	MPC · JPL
544638	2014 WP_{222}	—	November 14, 2001	Kitt Peak	Spacewatch	·	1.1 km	MPC · JPL
544639	2014 WB_{226}	—	September 21, 2001	Palomar	NEAT	MAR	1.4 km	MPC · JPL
544640	2014 WP_{228}	—	November 18, 2014	Haleakala	Pan-STARRS 1	·	3.3 km	MPC · JPL
544641	2014 WB_{229}	—	February 24, 2006	Kitt Peak	Spacewatch	·	1.5 km	MPC · JPL
544642	2014 WJ_{229}	—	June 28, 2001	Palomar	NEAT	(5)	1.7 km	MPC · JPL
544643	2014 WN_{229}	—	June 17, 2005	Mount Lemmon	Mount Lemmon Survey	(5)	1.2 km	MPC · JPL
544644	2014 WD_{231}	—	November 19, 2014	Mount Lemmon	Mount Lemmon Survey	·	2.0 km	MPC · JPL
544645	2014 WQ_{231}	—	November 19, 2014	Catalina	CSS	·	3.3 km	MPC · JPL
544646	2014 WJ_{233}	—	October 24, 2005	Palomar	NEAT	ADE	2.2 km	MPC · JPL
544647	2014 WA_{236}	—	March 28, 2008	Mount Lemmon	Mount Lemmon Survey	EUN	1.1 km	MPC · JPL
544648	2014 WJ_{237}	—	October 22, 2008	Kitt Peak	Spacewatch	·	3.3 km	MPC · JPL
544649	2014 WM_{237}	—	September 3, 2010	Mount Lemmon	Mount Lemmon Survey	EUN	1.2 km	MPC · JPL
544650	2014 WS_{237}	—	September 25, 2014	Kitt Peak	Spacewatch	·	1.1 km	MPC · JPL
544651	2014 WP_{240}	—	November 20, 2014	Haleakala	Pan-STARRS 1	·	1.5 km	MPC · JPL
544652	2014 WV_{241}	—	July 10, 2014	Haleakala	Pan-STARRS 1	·	1.8 km	MPC · JPL
544653	2014 WD_{242}	—	June 24, 2014	Haleakala	Pan-STARRS 1	·	2.5 km	MPC · JPL
544654	2014 WP_{242}	—	September 16, 2003	Palomar	NEAT	·	1.4 km	MPC · JPL
544655	2014 WU_{242}	—	October 25, 2005	Mount Lemmon	Mount Lemmon Survey	·	2.2 km	MPC · JPL
544656	2014 WM_{243}	—	December 2, 2005	Kitt Peak	Spacewatch	NAE	2.7 km	MPC · JPL
544657	2014 WV_{243}	—	August 26, 2009	Catalina	CSS	·	1.7 km	MPC · JPL
544658	2014 WN_{244}	—	January 17, 2007	Mount Lemmon	Mount Lemmon Survey	JUN	980 m	MPC · JPL
544659	2014 WY_{244}	—	September 22, 2014	Haleakala	Pan-STARRS 1	·	950 m	MPC · JPL
544660	2014 WU_{246}	—	August 11, 2004	Siding Spring	SSS	·	3.4 km	MPC · JPL
544661	2014 WM_{248}	—	July 29, 2005	Palomar	NEAT	·	1.9 km	MPC · JPL
544662	2014 WA_{249}	—	November 11, 2010	Kitt Peak	Spacewatch	·	1.6 km	MPC · JPL
544663	2014 WE_{250}	—	April 1, 2011	Catalina	CSS	·	2.5 km	MPC · JPL
544664	2014 WM_{250}	—	October 16, 2006	Catalina	CSS	·	1.2 km	MPC · JPL
544665	2014 WU_{251}	—	November 21, 2014	Mount Lemmon	Mount Lemmon Survey	·	1.7 km	MPC · JPL
544666	2014 WJ_{252}	—	August 4, 2002	Palomar	NEAT	PHO	1.1 km	MPC · JPL
544667	2014 WN_{252}	—	October 5, 2005	Catalina	CSS	·	2.6 km	MPC · JPL
544668	2014 WQ_{252}	—	November 13, 2010	Mount Lemmon	Mount Lemmon Survey	·	1.1 km	MPC · JPL
544669	2014 WO_{254}	—	January 27, 2007	Mount Lemmon	Mount Lemmon Survey	·	1.5 km	MPC · JPL
544670	2014 WU_{261}	—	September 20, 2009	Mount Lemmon	Mount Lemmon Survey	·	1.4 km	MPC · JPL
544671	2014 WF_{262}	—	November 21, 2014	Haleakala	Pan-STARRS 1	·	1.5 km	MPC · JPL
544672	2014 WJ_{264}	—	April 22, 2007	Kitt Peak	Spacewatch	·	1.7 km	MPC · JPL
544673	2014 WZ_{264}	—	July 14, 2013	Haleakala	Pan-STARRS 1	·	2.1 km	MPC · JPL
544674	2014 WK_{270}	—	August 29, 2009	Kitt Peak	Spacewatch	·	1.6 km	MPC · JPL
544675	2014 WN_{270}	—	October 23, 2001	Palomar	NEAT	·	1.3 km	MPC · JPL
544676	2014 WO_{271}	—	August 27, 2009	Kitt Peak	Spacewatch	·	1.3 km	MPC · JPL
544677	2014 WY_{271}	—	September 25, 2009	Kitt Peak	Spacewatch	·	1.4 km	MPC · JPL
544678	2014 WU_{274}	—	October 25, 2014	Mount Lemmon	Mount Lemmon Survey	·	1.4 km	MPC · JPL
544679	2014 WS_{275}	—	December 14, 2010	Mount Lemmon	Mount Lemmon Survey	·	1.7 km	MPC · JPL
544680	2014 WK_{276}	—	May 3, 2008	Mount Lemmon	Mount Lemmon Survey	·	1.6 km	MPC · JPL
544681	2014 WU_{276}	—	November 21, 2014	Haleakala	Pan-STARRS 1	·	2.8 km	MPC · JPL
544682	2014 WA_{277}	—	December 8, 2010	Mount Lemmon	Mount Lemmon Survey	·	2.0 km	MPC · JPL
544683	2014 WJ_{277}	—	September 29, 2009	Mount Lemmon	Mount Lemmon Survey	·	1.7 km	MPC · JPL
544684	2014 WM_{277}	—	March 4, 2005	Kitt Peak	Spacewatch	·	1.3 km	MPC · JPL
544685	2014 WX_{277}	—	July 24, 2003	Wise	Polishook, D.	·	2.1 km	MPC · JPL
544686	2014 WG_{278}	—	May 2, 2006	Mount Lemmon	Mount Lemmon Survey	·	1.5 km	MPC · JPL
544687	2014 WX_{278}	—	September 4, 2014	Haleakala	Pan-STARRS 1	·	2.5 km	MPC · JPL
544688	2014 WK_{279}	—	April 27, 2012	Haleakala	Pan-STARRS 1	·	2.1 km	MPC · JPL
544689	2014 WW_{279}	—	June 15, 2005	Mount Lemmon	Mount Lemmon Survey	(5)	1.3 km	MPC · JPL
544690	2014 WG_{280}	—	December 27, 2005	Kitt Peak	Spacewatch	MRX	820 m	MPC · JPL
544691	2014 WS_{280}	—	September 25, 2009	Kitt Peak	Spacewatch	·	1.7 km	MPC · JPL
544692	2014 WV_{280}	—	September 20, 2014	Haleakala	Pan-STARRS 1	EOS	1.5 km	MPC · JPL
544693	2014 WJ_{281}	—	September 12, 2009	Kitt Peak	Spacewatch	MRX	910 m	MPC · JPL
544694	2014 WO_{283}	—	April 28, 2012	Mount Lemmon	Mount Lemmon Survey	·	2.7 km	MPC · JPL
544695	2014 WM_{287}	—	May 12, 2013	Mount Lemmon	Mount Lemmon Survey	·	910 m	MPC · JPL
544696	2014 WW_{288}	—	October 2, 2014	Haleakala	Pan-STARRS 1	BRA	1.1 km	MPC · JPL
544697	2014 WC_{293}	—	July 14, 2013	Haleakala	Pan-STARRS 1	·	1.8 km	MPC · JPL
544698	2014 WJ_{293}	—	October 9, 2002	Palomar	NEAT	·	3.8 km	MPC · JPL
544699	2014 WB_{295}	—	August 14, 2013	Haleakala	Pan-STARRS 1	·	2.6 km	MPC · JPL
544700	2014 WH_{295}	—	September 4, 2014	Haleakala	Pan-STARRS 1	·	2.2 km	MPC · JPL

== 544701–544800 ==
back to top

Designation			Discovery			Properties		Ref
Permanent	Provisional	Named after	Date	Site	Discoverer(s)	Category	Diam.	Ref
544701	2014 WC_{297}	—	November 24, 2006	Kitt Peak	Spacewatch	EUN	1.1 km	MPC · JPL
544702	2014 WQ_{298}	—	January 30, 2006	Kitt Peak	Spacewatch	·	1.6 km	MPC · JPL
544703	2014 WV_{298}	—	October 2, 2014	Haleakala	Pan-STARRS 1	·	1.9 km	MPC · JPL
544704	2014 WM_{300}	—	October 28, 2014	Haleakala	Pan-STARRS 1	·	2.1 km	MPC · JPL
544705	2014 WZ_{300}	—	October 12, 2014	Mount Lemmon	Mount Lemmon Survey	·	2.1 km	MPC · JPL
544706	2014 WL_{301}	—	November 17, 2010	Mount Lemmon	Mount Lemmon Survey	EOS	2.0 km	MPC · JPL
544707	2014 WE_{302}	—	June 20, 2013	Haleakala	Pan-STARRS 1	·	2.6 km	MPC · JPL
544708	2014 WD_{304}	—	October 29, 2010	Mount Lemmon	Mount Lemmon Survey	·	1.4 km	MPC · JPL
544709	2014 WB_{305}	—	January 19, 2012	Haleakala	Pan-STARRS 1	·	2.4 km	MPC · JPL
544710	2014 WW_{306}	—	October 30, 2014	Mount Lemmon	Mount Lemmon Survey	·	1.3 km	MPC · JPL
544711	2014 WO_{307}	—	October 21, 2014	Kitt Peak	Spacewatch	·	1.4 km	MPC · JPL
544712	2014 WW_{307}	—	February 25, 2011	Mount Lemmon	Mount Lemmon Survey	·	1.4 km	MPC · JPL
544713	2014 WW_{309}	—	October 20, 2003	Palomar	NEAT	·	2.5 km	MPC · JPL
544714	2014 WY_{310}	—	July 15, 2013	Haleakala	Pan-STARRS 1	·	2.1 km	MPC · JPL
544715	2014 WM_{313}	—	July 13, 2013	Haleakala	Pan-STARRS 1	·	1.9 km	MPC · JPL
544716	2014 WH_{314}	—	March 24, 2012	Mount Lemmon	Mount Lemmon Survey	·	2.2 km	MPC · JPL
544717	2014 WJ_{317}	—	December 10, 2010	Mount Lemmon	Mount Lemmon Survey	·	1.9 km	MPC · JPL
544718	2014 WU_{317}	—	March 29, 2012	Haleakala	Pan-STARRS 1	·	1.3 km	MPC · JPL
544719	2014 WA_{318}	—	November 23, 2006	Kitt Peak	Spacewatch	KON	2.0 km	MPC · JPL
544720	2014 WC_{318}	—	February 26, 2012	Kitt Peak	Spacewatch	·	1.4 km	MPC · JPL
544721	2014 WQ_{318}	—	August 14, 2001	Haleakala	NEAT	·	1.7 km	MPC · JPL
544722	2014 WB_{319}	—	August 23, 2014	Haleakala	Pan-STARRS 1	EUN	1.1 km	MPC · JPL
544723	2014 WA_{320}	—	May 16, 2013	Mount Lemmon	Mount Lemmon Survey	·	1.2 km	MPC · JPL
544724	2014 WL_{321}	—	August 31, 2014	Haleakala	Pan-STARRS 1	·	1.1 km	MPC · JPL
544725	2014 WS_{323}	—	March 16, 2007	Kitt Peak	Spacewatch	·	2.0 km	MPC · JPL
544726	2014 WU_{323}	—	November 24, 2009	Mount Lemmon	Mount Lemmon Survey	EOS	1.8 km	MPC · JPL
544727	2011 BT_{49}	—	January 31, 2011	Piszkéstető	K. Sárneczky, Z. Kuli	·	2.4 km	MPC · JPL
544728	2014 WF_{333}	—	May 14, 2012	Mount Lemmon	Mount Lemmon Survey	·	1.2 km	MPC · JPL
544729	2014 WK_{334}	—	March 24, 2012	Mount Lemmon	Mount Lemmon Survey	·	1.3 km	MPC · JPL
544730	2014 WU_{336}	—	June 13, 2012	Haleakala	Pan-STARRS 1	·	2.0 km	MPC · JPL
544731	2014 WG_{343}	—	August 31, 2014	Haleakala	Pan-STARRS 1	MAR	1.0 km	MPC · JPL
544732	2014 WU_{347}	—	July 28, 2009	Kitt Peak	Spacewatch	·	1.4 km	MPC · JPL
544733	2014 WF_{349}	—	March 2, 2011	Catalina	CSS	·	2.0 km	MPC · JPL
544734	2014 WL_{349}	—	July 1, 2013	Haleakala	Pan-STARRS 1	·	1.8 km	MPC · JPL
544735	2014 WO_{350}	—	November 25, 2005	Catalina	CSS	·	1.9 km	MPC · JPL
544736	2014 WQ_{350}	—	November 30, 2010	Mount Lemmon	Mount Lemmon Survey	(5)	1.5 km	MPC · JPL
544737	2014 WR_{351}	—	December 14, 2010	Mount Lemmon	Mount Lemmon Survey	·	1.5 km	MPC · JPL
544738	2014 WC_{352}	—	September 4, 2014	Haleakala	Pan-STARRS 1	·	1.5 km	MPC · JPL
544739	2014 WR_{352}	—	December 2, 2005	Mauna Kea	A. Boattini	·	2.0 km	MPC · JPL
544740	2014 WE_{353}	—	March 11, 2011	Kitt Peak	Spacewatch	·	2.8 km	MPC · JPL
544741	2014 WF_{354}	—	March 4, 2005	Kitt Peak	Spacewatch	·	2.6 km	MPC · JPL
544742	2014 WH_{354}	—	March 4, 2010	Kitt Peak	Spacewatch	·	2.3 km	MPC · JPL
544743	2014 WM_{354}	—	February 9, 2010	Kitt Peak	Spacewatch	·	2.4 km	MPC · JPL
544744	2014 WQ_{354}	—	April 18, 2007	Mount Lemmon	Mount Lemmon Survey	·	2.4 km	MPC · JPL
544745	2014 WW_{354}	—	November 23, 2014	Haleakala	Pan-STARRS 1	H	480 m	MPC · JPL
544746	2014 WS_{355}	—	December 10, 2002	Palomar	NEAT	(5931)	3.1 km	MPC · JPL
544747	2014 WV_{355}	—	October 20, 2011	Haleakala	Pan-STARRS 1	H	540 m	MPC · JPL
544748	2014 WB_{357}	—	October 6, 2005	Bergisch Gladbach	W. Bickel	·	1.6 km	MPC · JPL
544749	2014 WN_{357}	—	November 24, 2014	Mount Lemmon	Mount Lemmon Survey	·	2.6 km	MPC · JPL
544750	2014 WH_{358}	—	August 30, 2005	Kitt Peak	Spacewatch	·	1.3 km	MPC · JPL
544751	2014 WW_{360}	—	August 29, 2005	Palomar	NEAT	·	1.7 km	MPC · JPL
544752	2014 WC_{361}	—	November 25, 2014	Mount Lemmon	Mount Lemmon Survey	·	1.6 km	MPC · JPL
544753	2014 WX_{361}	—	January 30, 2011	Mount Lemmon	Mount Lemmon Survey	·	1.5 km	MPC · JPL
544754	2014 WN_{362}	—	November 26, 2014	Mount Lemmon	Mount Lemmon Survey	H	520 m	MPC · JPL
544755	2014 WJ_{363}	—	December 10, 2009	Mount Lemmon	Mount Lemmon Survey	H	470 m	MPC · JPL
544756	2014 WN_{364}	—	December 27, 1999	Kitt Peak	Spacewatch	H	500 m	MPC · JPL
544757	2014 WO_{364}	—	November 27, 2014	Mount Lemmon	Mount Lemmon Survey	H	570 m	MPC · JPL
544758	2014 WX_{365}	—	November 16, 2009	Kitt Peak	Spacewatch	H	430 m	MPC · JPL
544759	2014 WZ_{366}	—	January 23, 2011	Les Engarouines	L. Bernasconi	·	2.2 km	MPC · JPL
544760	2014 WX_{369}	—	July 25, 2011	Haleakala	Pan-STARRS 1	H	500 m	MPC · JPL
544761	2014 WM_{370}	—	October 3, 2014	Haleakala	Pan-STARRS 1	H	440 m	MPC · JPL
544762	2014 WX_{371}	—	March 15, 2007	Kitt Peak	Spacewatch	·	1.6 km	MPC · JPL
544763	2014 WE_{372}	—	September 5, 2008	Kitt Peak	Spacewatch	(43176)	2.8 km	MPC · JPL
544764	2014 WN_{372}	—	July 16, 2013	Piszkés-tető	K. Sárneczky, E. Bányai	·	3.3 km	MPC · JPL
544765	2014 WU_{373}	—	August 16, 2009	Kitt Peak	Spacewatch	·	1.7 km	MPC · JPL
544766	2014 WP_{376}	—	September 26, 2008	Kitt Peak	Spacewatch	·	2.1 km	MPC · JPL
544767	2014 WY_{376}	—	December 29, 2005	Kitt Peak	Spacewatch	·	1.7 km	MPC · JPL
544768	2014 WO_{377}	—	November 22, 2014	Mount Lemmon	Mount Lemmon Survey	·	2.0 km	MPC · JPL
544769	2014 WY_{377}	—	October 30, 2014	Mount Lemmon	Mount Lemmon Survey	·	3.6 km	MPC · JPL
544770	2014 WJ_{378}	—	October 10, 2008	Mount Lemmon	Mount Lemmon Survey	·	2.5 km	MPC · JPL
544771	2014 WZ_{378}	—	February 10, 2011	Mount Lemmon	Mount Lemmon Survey	·	1.8 km	MPC · JPL
544772	2014 WP_{379}	—	September 24, 2008	Mount Lemmon	Mount Lemmon Survey	·	2.9 km	MPC · JPL
544773	2014 WR_{380}	—	December 5, 2010	Kitt Peak	Spacewatch	·	2.0 km	MPC · JPL
544774	2014 WS_{380}	—	November 22, 2014	Haleakala	Pan-STARRS 1	EUP	4.0 km	MPC · JPL
544775	2014 WC_{381}	—	April 4, 2005	Mount Lemmon	Mount Lemmon Survey	EOS	1.8 km	MPC · JPL
544776	2014 WM_{381}	—	July 15, 2004	Siding Spring	SSS	·	2.1 km	MPC · JPL
544777	2014 WX_{381}	—	February 6, 2005	Uccle	E. W. Elst, H. Debehogne	·	1.9 km	MPC · JPL
544778	2014 WX_{382}	—	December 10, 2010	Kitt Peak	Spacewatch	WIT	1 km	MPC · JPL
544779	2014 WK_{383}	—	October 22, 2014	Mount Lemmon	Mount Lemmon Survey	·	1.7 km	MPC · JPL
544780	2014 WJ_{385}	—	February 27, 2006	Mount Lemmon	Mount Lemmon Survey	·	1.5 km	MPC · JPL
544781	2014 WR_{385}	—	April 27, 2012	Haleakala	Pan-STARRS 1	·	1.8 km	MPC · JPL
544782	2014 WK_{388}	—	January 10, 2011	Mount Lemmon	Mount Lemmon Survey	·	1.5 km	MPC · JPL
544783	2014 WU_{389}	—	October 3, 2005	Catalina	CSS	·	1.6 km	MPC · JPL
544784	2014 WG_{390}	—	August 25, 2014	Haleakala	Pan-STARRS 1	MAR	1.1 km	MPC · JPL
544785	2014 WH_{390}	—	November 10, 2005	Kitt Peak	Spacewatch	·	1.8 km	MPC · JPL
544786	2014 WT_{390}	—	November 15, 2010	Mount Lemmon	Mount Lemmon Survey	·	1.2 km	MPC · JPL
544787	2014 WU_{390}	—	December 13, 2006	Mount Lemmon	Mount Lemmon Survey	EUN	1.6 km	MPC · JPL
544788	2014 WY_{390}	—	October 1, 2003	Kitt Peak	Spacewatch	·	2.0 km	MPC · JPL
544789	2014 WN_{392}	—	December 18, 2009	Mount Lemmon	Mount Lemmon Survey	·	2.2 km	MPC · JPL
544790	2014 WE_{393}	—	December 18, 2004	Mount Lemmon	Mount Lemmon Survey	·	2.6 km	MPC · JPL
544791	2014 WL_{393}	—	November 24, 2014	Mount Lemmon	Mount Lemmon Survey	H	560 m	MPC · JPL
544792	2014 WQ_{393}	—	July 15, 2005	Kitt Peak	Spacewatch	EUN	1.3 km	MPC · JPL
544793	2014 WM_{394}	—	August 25, 2005	Palomar	NEAT	ADE	1.7 km	MPC · JPL
544794	2014 WR_{394}	—	January 2, 2011	Mount Lemmon	Mount Lemmon Survey	·	1.3 km	MPC · JPL
544795	2014 WA_{396}	—	October 30, 2014	Mount Lemmon	Mount Lemmon Survey	·	1.6 km	MPC · JPL
544796	2014 WD_{396}	—	September 21, 2003	Kitt Peak	Spacewatch	·	1.9 km	MPC · JPL
544797	2014 WK_{396}	—	March 10, 2008	Kitt Peak	Spacewatch	·	1.4 km	MPC · JPL
544798	2014 WM_{396}	—	January 3, 2012	Mount Lemmon	Mount Lemmon Survey	·	2.1 km	MPC · JPL
544799	2014 WQ_{396}	—	January 30, 2011	Haleakala	Pan-STARRS 1	·	1.7 km	MPC · JPL
544800	2014 WM_{397}	—	October 30, 2014	Haleakala	Pan-STARRS 1	·	1.5 km	MPC · JPL

== 544801–544900 ==
back to top

Designation			Discovery			Properties		Ref
Permanent	Provisional	Named after	Date	Site	Discoverer(s)	Category	Diam.	Ref
544801	2014 WD_{398}	—	November 25, 2014	Mount Lemmon	Mount Lemmon Survey	·	1.7 km	MPC · JPL
544802	2014 WP_{398}	—	October 7, 2014	Haleakala	Pan-STARRS 1	·	1.8 km	MPC · JPL
544803	2014 WO_{399}	—	November 25, 2014	Haleakala	Pan-STARRS 1	EOS	1.7 km	MPC · JPL
544804	2014 WC_{403}	—	September 4, 2014	Haleakala	Pan-STARRS 1	·	1.5 km	MPC · JPL
544805	2014 WJ_{403}	—	November 16, 2014	Mount Lemmon	Mount Lemmon Survey	·	1.4 km	MPC · JPL
544806	2014 WL_{403}	—	October 31, 2014	Mount Lemmon	Mount Lemmon Survey	EOS	1.6 km	MPC · JPL
544807	2014 WN_{404}	—	November 26, 2014	Haleakala	Pan-STARRS 1	·	1.5 km	MPC · JPL
544808	2014 WX_{404}	—	October 22, 2014	Mount Lemmon	Mount Lemmon Survey	·	2.1 km	MPC · JPL
544809	2014 WK_{406}	—	November 19, 2014	Mount Lemmon	Mount Lemmon Survey	·	1.5 km	MPC · JPL
544810	2014 WU_{407}	—	October 21, 2005	Palomar	NEAT	·	1.9 km	MPC · JPL
544811	2014 WD_{408}	—	November 26, 2014	Haleakala	Pan-STARRS 1	H	630 m	MPC · JPL
544812	2014 WE_{408}	—	November 26, 2014	Haleakala	Pan-STARRS 1	EOS	2.0 km	MPC · JPL
544813	2014 WT_{408}	—	January 17, 2007	Kitt Peak	Spacewatch	·	1.4 km	MPC · JPL
544814	2014 WJ_{409}	—	October 24, 2003	Kitt Peak	Spacewatch	·	2.4 km	MPC · JPL
544815	2014 WN_{409}	—	November 26, 2014	Haleakala	Pan-STARRS 1	·	3.3 km	MPC · JPL
544816	2014 WP_{409}	—	December 15, 2006	Kitt Peak	Spacewatch	·	1.1 km	MPC · JPL
544817	2014 WN_{410}	—	November 26, 2014	Haleakala	Pan-STARRS 1	H	350 m	MPC · JPL
544818	2014 WO_{410}	—	December 7, 2005	Kitt Peak	Spacewatch	·	1.7 km	MPC · JPL
544819	2014 WW_{410}	—	March 3, 2000	Kitt Peak	Spacewatch	·	1.6 km	MPC · JPL
544820	2014 WD_{411}	—	October 28, 2008	Catalina	CSS	·	2.7 km	MPC · JPL
544821	2014 WK_{412}	—	September 3, 2008	Kitt Peak	Spacewatch	·	2.2 km	MPC · JPL
544822	2014 WF_{415}	—	November 24, 2014	Kitt Peak	Spacewatch	·	1.6 km	MPC · JPL
544823	2014 WW_{415}	—	September 4, 2014	Haleakala	Pan-STARRS 1	EUN	1.4 km	MPC · JPL
544824	2014 WW_{416}	—	November 23, 2014	Catalina	CSS	·	1.8 km	MPC · JPL
544825	2014 WP_{417}	—	November 26, 2014	Haleakala	Pan-STARRS 1	·	1.6 km	MPC · JPL
544826	2014 WJ_{418}	—	November 26, 2014	Haleakala	Pan-STARRS 1	·	1.8 km	MPC · JPL
544827	2014 WU_{419}	—	March 5, 2011	Mount Lemmon	Mount Lemmon Survey	·	1.9 km	MPC · JPL
544828	2014 WV_{420}	—	December 17, 2009	Mount Lemmon	Mount Lemmon Survey	·	1.5 km	MPC · JPL
544829	2014 WA_{421}	—	May 21, 2013	Mount Lemmon	Mount Lemmon Survey	·	1.8 km	MPC · JPL
544830	2014 WP_{421}	—	September 15, 2009	Kitt Peak	Spacewatch	·	1.9 km	MPC · JPL
544831	2014 WU_{422}	—	November 26, 2014	Haleakala	Pan-STARRS 1	EUN	1.2 km	MPC · JPL
544832	2014 WV_{422}	—	October 2, 2014	Haleakala	Pan-STARRS 1	THB	2.6 km	MPC · JPL
544833	2014 WB_{424}	—	March 15, 2004	Kitt Peak	Spacewatch	·	2.8 km	MPC · JPL
544834	2014 WL_{424}	—	November 26, 2014	Haleakala	Pan-STARRS 1	·	2.6 km	MPC · JPL
544835	2014 WW_{424}	—	January 11, 2010	Kitt Peak	Spacewatch	HYG	2.8 km	MPC · JPL
544836	2014 WC_{426}	—	August 14, 2013	Haleakala	Pan-STARRS 1	·	2.3 km	MPC · JPL
544837	2014 WT_{428}	—	November 26, 2014	Haleakala	Pan-STARRS 1	·	3.1 km	MPC · JPL
544838	2014 WF_{429}	—	September 30, 2003	Kitt Peak	Spacewatch	·	2.8 km	MPC · JPL
544839	2014 WM_{429}	—	December 1, 2008	Kitt Peak	Spacewatch	·	1.7 km	MPC · JPL
544840	2014 WM_{430}	—	October 3, 2014	Mount Lemmon	Mount Lemmon Survey	EOS	1.8 km	MPC · JPL
544841	2014 WZ_{433}	—	March 17, 2004	Siding Spring	SSS	·	1.9 km	MPC · JPL
544842	2014 WR_{434}	—	February 5, 2011	Mount Lemmon	Mount Lemmon Survey	·	1.6 km	MPC · JPL
544843	2014 WS_{434}	—	July 30, 2009	Kitt Peak	Spacewatch	·	1.2 km	MPC · JPL
544844	2014 WC_{435}	—	September 18, 2003	Kitt Peak	Spacewatch	EOS	1.6 km	MPC · JPL
544845	2014 WX_{435}	—	March 9, 2007	Mount Lemmon	Mount Lemmon Survey	·	1.7 km	MPC · JPL
544846	2014 WA_{436}	—	November 27, 2014	Haleakala	Pan-STARRS 1	(5)	1.3 km	MPC · JPL
544847	2014 WE_{437}	—	August 15, 2009	Kitt Peak	Spacewatch	·	1.8 km	MPC · JPL
544848	2014 WQ_{437}	—	December 16, 2009	Mount Lemmon	Mount Lemmon Survey	·	1.7 km	MPC · JPL
544849	2014 WN_{438}	—	July 1, 2013	Haleakala	Pan-STARRS 1	AGN	1.0 km	MPC · JPL
544850	2014 WO_{439}	—	February 29, 2004	Kitt Peak	Spacewatch	RAF	860 m	MPC · JPL
544851	2014 WN_{440}	—	November 4, 2014	Mount Lemmon	Mount Lemmon Survey	·	2.6 km	MPC · JPL
544852	2014 WB_{441}	—	November 24, 2014	Mount Lemmon	Mount Lemmon Survey	·	2.6 km	MPC · JPL
544853	2014 WC_{443}	—	February 8, 2011	Mount Lemmon	Mount Lemmon Survey	·	1.5 km	MPC · JPL
544854	2014 WN_{444}	—	January 10, 2011	Mount Lemmon	Mount Lemmon Survey	NEM	2.1 km	MPC · JPL
544855	2014 WU_{445}	—	October 2, 2005	Mount Lemmon	Mount Lemmon Survey	·	1.5 km	MPC · JPL
544856	2014 WV_{445}	—	September 29, 2005	Kitt Peak	Spacewatch	·	1.4 km	MPC · JPL
544857	2014 WX_{445}	—	May 1, 2003	Kitt Peak	Spacewatch	·	1.5 km	MPC · JPL
544858	2014 WQ_{446}	—	August 26, 2001	Haleakala	NEAT	·	1.4 km	MPC · JPL
544859	2014 WW_{447}	—	February 19, 2012	Mount Graham	Boyle, R. P.	·	1.2 km	MPC · JPL
544860	2014 WB_{448}	—	January 15, 2007	Catalina	CSS	EUN	1.5 km	MPC · JPL
544861	2014 WJ_{448}	—	March 18, 2001	Kitt Peak	Spacewatch	·	1.3 km	MPC · JPL
544862	2014 WU_{448}	—	November 20, 2014	Mount Lemmon	Mount Lemmon Survey	·	2.2 km	MPC · JPL
544863	2014 WV_{448}	—	August 15, 2013	Haleakala	Pan-STARRS 1	·	1.8 km	MPC · JPL
544864	2014 WB_{449}	—	February 6, 2007	Mount Lemmon	Mount Lemmon Survey	·	1.7 km	MPC · JPL
544865	2014 WL_{449}	—	November 27, 2014	Haleakala	Pan-STARRS 1	·	1.6 km	MPC · JPL
544866	2014 WB_{450}	—	July 13, 2013	Haleakala	Pan-STARRS 1	WIT	820 m	MPC · JPL
544867	2014 WK_{450}	—	September 13, 2005	Kitt Peak	Spacewatch	·	1.1 km	MPC · JPL
544868	2014 WA_{451}	—	November 27, 2014	Haleakala	Pan-STARRS 1	·	1.7 km	MPC · JPL
544869	2014 WE_{451}	—	April 21, 2013	Haleakala	Pan-STARRS 1	·	2.9 km	MPC · JPL
544870	2014 WN_{453}	—	July 29, 2008	Mount Lemmon	Mount Lemmon Survey	·	2.5 km	MPC · JPL
544871	2014 WU_{453}	—	November 27, 2014	Haleakala	Pan-STARRS 1	·	1.6 km	MPC · JPL
544872	2014 WC_{454}	—	October 2, 2014	Haleakala	Pan-STARRS 1	·	1.5 km	MPC · JPL
544873	2014 WH_{455}	—	January 14, 2011	Kitt Peak	Spacewatch	JUN	890 m	MPC · JPL
544874	2014 WR_{455}	—	September 13, 2005	Kitt Peak	Spacewatch	·	1.3 km	MPC · JPL
544875	2014 WY_{456}	—	September 24, 2009	Mount Lemmon	Mount Lemmon Survey	·	1.6 km	MPC · JPL
544876	2014 WU_{459}	—	January 10, 2007	Mount Lemmon	Mount Lemmon Survey	·	1.3 km	MPC · JPL
544877	2014 WN_{461}	—	November 17, 2014	Haleakala	Pan-STARRS 1	·	1.3 km	MPC · JPL
544878	2014 WT_{461}	—	August 29, 2005	Palomar	NEAT	EUN	1.1 km	MPC · JPL
544879	2014 WY_{461}	—	December 10, 2009	Mount Lemmon	Mount Lemmon Survey	·	1.4 km	MPC · JPL
544880	2014 WD_{462}	—	November 27, 2014	Haleakala	Pan-STARRS 1	·	1.1 km	MPC · JPL
544881	2014 WS_{462}	—	November 26, 2014	Kitt Peak	Spacewatch	·	1.2 km	MPC · JPL
544882	2014 WB_{463}	—	November 22, 2014	Mount Lemmon	Mount Lemmon Survey	·	1.8 km	MPC · JPL
544883	2014 WZ_{464}	—	September 19, 2003	Anderson Mesa	LONEOS	·	2.0 km	MPC · JPL
544884	2014 WC_{465}	—	September 1, 2005	Kitt Peak	Spacewatch	·	1.1 km	MPC · JPL
544885	2014 WG_{466}	—	October 22, 2014	Mount Lemmon	Mount Lemmon Survey	·	1.6 km	MPC · JPL
544886	2014 WF_{467}	—	October 3, 2013	Mount Lemmon	Mount Lemmon Survey	·	2.1 km	MPC · JPL
544887	2014 WN_{468}	—	November 29, 1999	Kitt Peak	Spacewatch	·	1.9 km	MPC · JPL
544888	2014 WN_{472}	—	June 17, 2005	Mount Lemmon	Mount Lemmon Survey	·	1.1 km	MPC · JPL
544889	2014 WP_{472}	—	July 29, 2001	Palomar	NEAT	KON	2.9 km	MPC · JPL
544890	2014 WJ_{475}	—	January 27, 2007	Mount Lemmon	Mount Lemmon Survey	·	1.3 km	MPC · JPL
544891	2014 WL_{475}	—	November 28, 2014	Mount Lemmon	Mount Lemmon Survey	·	2.8 km	MPC · JPL
544892	2014 WV_{475}	—	July 3, 2013	Oukaïmeden	M. Ory	·	2.4 km	MPC · JPL
544893	2014 WK_{476}	—	July 13, 2001	Palomar	NEAT	·	1.6 km	MPC · JPL
544894	2014 WR_{476}	—	May 28, 2008	Mount Lemmon	Mount Lemmon Survey	·	1.1 km	MPC · JPL
544895	2014 WV_{476}	—	March 29, 2012	Kitt Peak	Spacewatch	·	1.3 km	MPC · JPL
544896	2014 WA_{477}	—	January 30, 2011	Mount Lemmon	Mount Lemmon Survey	·	1.4 km	MPC · JPL
544897	2014 WF_{478}	—	November 28, 2014	Haleakala	Pan-STARRS 1	(22805)	2.5 km	MPC · JPL
544898	2014 WQ_{478}	—	November 28, 2014	Haleakala	Pan-STARRS 1	·	2.8 km	MPC · JPL
544899	2014 WW_{478}	—	September 6, 2008	Mount Lemmon	Mount Lemmon Survey	·	1.8 km	MPC · JPL
544900	2014 WH_{479}	—	February 14, 2010	Kitt Peak	Spacewatch	EOS	2.1 km	MPC · JPL

== 544901–545000 ==
back to top

Designation			Discovery			Properties		Ref
Permanent	Provisional	Named after	Date	Site	Discoverer(s)	Category	Diam.	Ref
544901	2014 WA_{480}	—	October 2, 2013	Haleakala	Pan-STARRS 1	·	2.0 km	MPC · JPL
544902	2014 WC_{481}	—	November 28, 2014	Haleakala	Pan-STARRS 1	·	2.4 km	MPC · JPL
544903	2014 WH_{481}	—	November 28, 2014	Haleakala	Pan-STARRS 1	·	1.7 km	MPC · JPL
544904	2014 WT_{481}	—	August 27, 2001	Kitt Peak	Spacewatch	·	2.9 km	MPC · JPL
544905	2014 WW_{481}	—	November 16, 2014	Catalina	CSS	·	1.6 km	MPC · JPL
544906	2014 WP_{482}	—	May 25, 2007	Mount Lemmon	Mount Lemmon Survey	·	2.9 km	MPC · JPL
544907	2014 WR_{482}	—	June 7, 2013	Mount Lemmon	Mount Lemmon Survey	·	4.0 km	MPC · JPL
544908	2014 WG_{483}	—	October 31, 2014	Mount Lemmon	Mount Lemmon Survey	·	1.8 km	MPC · JPL
544909	2014 WG_{486}	—	January 29, 2011	Kitt Peak	Spacewatch	·	1.5 km	MPC · JPL
544910	2014 WL_{486}	—	August 31, 2005	Palomar	NEAT	·	1.7 km	MPC · JPL
544911	2014 WR_{486}	—	October 22, 2005	Kitt Peak	Spacewatch	·	1.3 km	MPC · JPL
544912	2014 WV_{486}	—	November 21, 2014	Haleakala	Pan-STARRS 1	·	2.5 km	MPC · JPL
544913	2014 WN_{487}	—	November 26, 2014	Haleakala	Pan-STARRS 1	·	3.7 km	MPC · JPL
544914	2014 WU_{488}	—	November 24, 2014	Mount Lemmon	Mount Lemmon Survey	EUN	1.2 km	MPC · JPL
544915	2014 WN_{489}	—	September 4, 2014	Haleakala	Pan-STARRS 1	·	2.0 km	MPC · JPL
544916	2014 WC_{490}	—	February 10, 2007	Mount Lemmon	Mount Lemmon Survey	·	1.3 km	MPC · JPL
544917	2014 WK_{490}	—	April 14, 2008	Mount Lemmon	Mount Lemmon Survey	·	1.4 km	MPC · JPL
544918	2014 WQ_{490}	—	March 10, 2007	Mount Lemmon	Mount Lemmon Survey	·	1.8 km	MPC · JPL
544919	2014 WA_{491}	—	March 14, 2007	Mount Lemmon	Mount Lemmon Survey	·	1.7 km	MPC · JPL
544920	2014 WM_{491}	—	November 4, 2014	Haleakala	Pan-STARRS 1	·	1.6 km	MPC · JPL
544921	2014 WV_{491}	—	July 16, 2007	Siding Spring	SSS	·	4.0 km	MPC · JPL
544922	2014 WE_{493}	—	January 29, 2003	Palomar	NEAT	·	1.5 km	MPC · JPL
544923	2014 WO_{493}	—	November 9, 2013	Haleakala	Pan-STARRS 1	·	3.1 km	MPC · JPL
544924	2014 WT_{493}	—	November 30, 2014	Haleakala	Pan-STARRS 1	H	530 m	MPC · JPL
544925	2014 WV_{494}	—	December 3, 2013	Kitt Peak	Spacewatch	VER	2.6 km	MPC · JPL
544926	2014 WS_{495}	—	August 24, 2007	Kitt Peak	Spacewatch	·	2.9 km	MPC · JPL
544927	2014 WC_{496}	—	August 7, 2013	ESA OGS	ESA OGS	T_{j} (2.97)	3.4 km	MPC · JPL
544928	2014 WS_{496}	—	November 30, 2014	Haleakala	Pan-STARRS 1	·	2.9 km	MPC · JPL
544929	2014 WW_{499}	—	January 28, 2007	Mount Lemmon	Mount Lemmon Survey	·	1.3 km	MPC · JPL
544930	2014 WX_{500}	—	May 15, 2013	Haleakala	Pan-STARRS 1	MAR	1.1 km	MPC · JPL
544931	2014 WC_{504}	—	August 10, 2001	Palomar	NEAT	·	1.1 km	MPC · JPL
544932	2014 WP_{504}	—	October 12, 2009	Mount Lemmon	Mount Lemmon Survey	·	2.4 km	MPC · JPL
544933	2014 WS_{505}	—	July 5, 2005	Mount Lemmon	Mount Lemmon Survey	JUN	920 m	MPC · JPL
544934	2014 WV_{505}	—	January 3, 1997	Kitt Peak	Spacewatch	·	1.5 km	MPC · JPL
544935	2014 WK_{506}	—	September 23, 2014	Haleakala	Pan-STARRS 1	·	1.1 km	MPC · JPL
544936	2014 WC_{507}	—	November 22, 2006	Mount Lemmon	Mount Lemmon Survey	·	1.6 km	MPC · JPL
544937	2014 WD_{513}	—	November 25, 2014	Haleakala	Pan-STARRS 1	H	370 m	MPC · JPL
544938	2014 WG_{515}	—	February 26, 2011	Mount Lemmon	Mount Lemmon Survey	·	1.6 km	MPC · JPL
544939	2014 WQ_{516}	—	December 5, 2005	Mount Lemmon	Mount Lemmon Survey	·	1.7 km	MPC · JPL
544940	2014 WS_{516}	—	September 6, 2008	Catalina	CSS	KOR	1.4 km	MPC · JPL
544941	2014 WY_{516}	—	August 31, 2005	Palomar	NEAT	·	1.4 km	MPC · JPL
544942	2014 WA_{517}	—	September 21, 2009	Mount Lemmon	Mount Lemmon Survey	·	1.3 km	MPC · JPL
544943	2014 WE_{518}	—	November 17, 2014	Haleakala	Pan-STARRS 1	·	980 m	MPC · JPL
544944	2014 WG_{518}	—	August 30, 2005	Kitt Peak	Spacewatch	·	1.0 km	MPC · JPL
544945	2014 WP_{518}	—	November 16, 1998	Kitt Peak	Spacewatch	·	1.6 km	MPC · JPL
544946	2014 WY_{518}	—	August 15, 2013	Haleakala	Pan-STARRS 1	·	2.1 km	MPC · JPL
544947	2014 WK_{519}	—	November 21, 2003	Palomar	NEAT	·	2.4 km	MPC · JPL
544948	2014 WY_{519}	—	November 24, 2014	Mount Lemmon	Mount Lemmon Survey	·	1.5 km	MPC · JPL
544949	2014 WX_{520}	—	April 30, 2012	Mount Lemmon	Mount Lemmon Survey	KOR	1.2 km	MPC · JPL
544950	2014 WY_{521}	—	March 15, 2007	Catalina	CSS	HNS	1.2 km	MPC · JPL
544951	2014 WD_{522}	—	September 19, 2003	Kitt Peak	Spacewatch	·	3.0 km	MPC · JPL
544952	2014 WE_{522}	—	March 2, 2011	Mount Lemmon	Mount Lemmon Survey	·	1.4 km	MPC · JPL
544953	2014 WJ_{522}	—	April 5, 2003	Kitt Peak	Spacewatch	·	1.3 km	MPC · JPL
544954	2014 WB_{524}	—	October 7, 2005	Mauna Kea	A. Boattini	615	1.3 km	MPC · JPL
544955	2014 WF_{524}	—	November 17, 2014	Haleakala	Pan-STARRS 1	·	2.0 km	MPC · JPL
544956	2014 WM_{524}	—	February 25, 2012	Kitt Peak	Spacewatch	·	1.2 km	MPC · JPL
544957	2014 WN_{524}	—	February 16, 2010	Kitt Peak	Spacewatch	TIR	2.2 km	MPC · JPL
544958	2014 WS_{524}	—	November 19, 2014	Haleakala	Pan-STARRS 1	·	1.4 km	MPC · JPL
544959	2014 WH_{525}	—	July 16, 2013	Haleakala	Pan-STARRS 1	·	1.5 km	MPC · JPL
544960	2014 WJ_{525}	—	March 2, 2011	Mount Lemmon	Mount Lemmon Survey	·	1.9 km	MPC · JPL
544961	2014 WU_{525}	—	November 20, 2014	Haleakala	Pan-STARRS 1	·	1.7 km	MPC · JPL
544962	2014 WW_{526}	—	November 20, 2008	Kitt Peak	Spacewatch	(31811)	2.2 km	MPC · JPL
544963	2014 WM_{527}	—	November 21, 2014	Haleakala	Pan-STARRS 1	·	1.8 km	MPC · JPL
544964	2014 WL_{529}	—	July 13, 2013	Haleakala	Pan-STARRS 1	·	1.5 km	MPC · JPL
544965	2014 WU_{529}	—	November 23, 2014	Mount Lemmon	Mount Lemmon Survey	·	1.7 km	MPC · JPL
544966	2014 WD_{530}	—	November 19, 2009	Kitt Peak	Spacewatch	·	2.5 km	MPC · JPL
544967	2014 WS_{530}	—	September 3, 2008	Kitt Peak	Spacewatch	EOS	1.9 km	MPC · JPL
544968	2014 WU_{530}	—	May 6, 2011	Mount Lemmon	Mount Lemmon Survey	·	2.1 km	MPC · JPL
544969	2014 WX_{530}	—	November 26, 2014	Haleakala	Pan-STARRS 1	·	1.2 km	MPC · JPL
544970	2014 WB_{531}	—	August 23, 2004	Kitt Peak	Spacewatch	·	1.3 km	MPC · JPL
544971	2014 WL_{531}	—	September 24, 2013	Catalina	CSS	·	3.0 km	MPC · JPL
544972	2014 WM_{531}	—	November 26, 2014	Haleakala	Pan-STARRS 1	VER	2.6 km	MPC · JPL
544973	2014 WW_{531}	—	September 6, 2013	Kitt Peak	Spacewatch	VER	2.4 km	MPC · JPL
544974	2014 WK_{533}	—	November 28, 2014	Haleakala	Pan-STARRS 1	HOF	2.3 km	MPC · JPL
544975	2014 WP_{533}	—	November 28, 2014	Haleakala	Pan-STARRS 1	·	2.4 km	MPC · JPL
544976	2014 WX_{533}	—	August 4, 2013	Haleakala	Pan-STARRS 1	KOR	1.4 km	MPC · JPL
544977	2014 WZ_{535}	—	November 23, 2014	Haleakala	Pan-STARRS 1	cubewano (hot)	276 km	MPC · JPL
544978	2014 WR_{543}	—	April 21, 2013	Haleakala	Pan-STARRS 1	·	3.9 km	MPC · JPL
544979	2014 WP_{544}	—	November 29, 2014	Mount Lemmon	Mount Lemmon Survey	·	2.6 km	MPC · JPL
544980	2014 WQ_{544}	—	November 30, 2014	Mount Lemmon	Mount Lemmon Survey	·	2.5 km	MPC · JPL
544981	2014 WF_{545}	—	November 26, 2014	Haleakala	Pan-STARRS 1	·	2.7 km	MPC · JPL
544982	2014 XT	—	June 22, 2001	Palomar	NEAT	·	2.6 km	MPC · JPL
544983	2014 XU	—	March 11, 2007	Kitt Peak	Spacewatch	·	2.8 km	MPC · JPL
544984	2014 XF_{2}	—	November 21, 2014	Haleakala	Pan-STARRS 1	BRA	1.5 km	MPC · JPL
544985	2014 XM_{2}	—	March 15, 2008	Mount Lemmon	Mount Lemmon Survey	·	1.4 km	MPC · JPL
544986	2014 XV_{2}	—	May 3, 2011	Kitt Peak	Spacewatch	·	3.2 km	MPC · JPL
544987	2014 XA_{3}	—	November 9, 2009	Kitt Peak	Spacewatch	GAL	1.5 km	MPC · JPL
544988	2014 XC_{3}	—	February 23, 2011	Kitt Peak	Spacewatch	·	2.0 km	MPC · JPL
544989	2014 XY_{3}	—	October 5, 2005	Bergisch Gladbach	W. Bickel	ADE	1.6 km	MPC · JPL
544990	2014 XD_{4}	—	September 23, 2014	Haleakala	Pan-STARRS 1	(194)	1.3 km	MPC · JPL
544991	2014 XH_{4}	—	November 22, 2014	Mount Lemmon	Mount Lemmon Survey	·	1.5 km	MPC · JPL
544992	2014 XS_{5}	—	January 30, 2011	Haleakala	Pan-STARRS 1	NAE	2.1 km	MPC · JPL
544993	2014 XZ_{5}	—	November 27, 2014	Kitt Peak	Spacewatch	·	2.3 km	MPC · JPL
544994	2014 XY_{6}	—	October 5, 2014	Haleakala	Pan-STARRS 1	H	440 m	MPC · JPL
544995	2014 XS_{7}	—	January 15, 2010	Kitt Peak	Spacewatch	H	470 m	MPC · JPL
544996	2014 XU_{8}	—	November 2, 2006	Mount Lemmon	Mount Lemmon Survey	(194)	1.2 km	MPC · JPL
544997	2014 XY_{8}	—	July 15, 2013	Haleakala	Pan-STARRS 1	·	2.6 km	MPC · JPL
544998	2014 XR_{9}	—	July 16, 2013	Haleakala	Pan-STARRS 1	·	1.9 km	MPC · JPL
544999	2014 XH_{10}	—	June 27, 2001	Kitt Peak	Spacewatch	·	1.7 km	MPC · JPL
545000	2014 XS_{10}	—	October 3, 2014	Mount Lemmon	Mount Lemmon Survey	·	1.2 km	MPC · JPL

back to top

== Meaning of names ==
As minor planet discoveries are confirmed, they are given a permanent number by the IAU's Minor Planet Center (MPC), and the discoverers can then submit names for them, following the IAU's naming conventions. The list below concerns those minor planets in the specified number-range that have received names, and explains the meanings of those names.

Official naming citations of newly named small Solar System bodies are approved and published in a bulletin by IAU's Working Group for Small Bodies Nomenclature (WGSBN). Before May 2021, citations were published in MPC's Minor Planet Circulars for many decades. Recent citations can also be found on the JPL Small-Body Database (SBDB). Until his death in 2016, German astronomer Lutz D. Schmadel compiled these citations into the Dictionary of Minor Planet Names (DMP) and regularly updated the collection.

Based on Paul Herget's The Names of the Minor Planets, Schmadel also researched the unclear origin of numerous asteroids, most of which had been named prior to World War II. This article incorporates text from this source, which is in the public domain: SBDB New namings may only be added to this list below after official publication as the preannouncement of names is condemned. The WGSBN publishes a comprehensive guideline for the naming rules of non-cometary small Solar System bodies.

Named minor planet	Provisional	This minor planet was named for...	Ref · Catalog
544033 Lihsing	2014 RR_{27}	Li Hsing (1930–2021) was a Taiwanese film director.	IAU · 544033
544309 Reuss	2014 UM_{62}	Gustáv Reuss (1818–1861), a well-known Slovak physician, writer and polymath.	IAU · 544309
544325 Péczbéla	2014 UR_{94}	Béla Pécz (born 1961), a Hungarian physicist and material scientist, who introduced aberration-corrected electron microscopy in Hungary and contributed to the development of devices based on gallium nitride and thin films using indium nitride.	IAU · 544325
544541 Srholec	2014 WP_{73}	Anton Srholec (1929–2016) was a Slovak Roman Catholic priest and Salesian.	IAU · 544541
544618 Bugátpál	2014 WP_{193}	Pál Bugát (1793–1865) was a Hungargian physician, university professor, and a language reformer.	IAU · 544618
