= List of minor planets: 743001–744000 =

The following is a partial list of minor planets, running from minor-planet number 743001 through 744000, inclusive. The primary data for this and other partial lists is based on JPL's "Small-Body Orbital Elements" and data available from the Minor Planet Center. Critical list information is also provided by the MPC, unless otherwise specified from Lowell Observatory. A detailed description of the table's columns and additional sources are given on the main page including a complete list of every page in this series, and a statistical break-up on the dynamical classification of minor planets.

Also see the summary list of all named bodies in numerical and alphabetical order, and the corresponding naming citations for the number range of this particular list. New namings may only be added to this list after official publication, as the preannouncement of names is condemned by the Working Group for Small Bodies Nomenclature of the International Astronomical Union.

Near-Earth obj.	MBA (inner)	MBA (outer)	Centaur
Mars-crosser	MBA (middle)	Jupiter trojan	Trans-Neptunian obj.
Unclassified

== 743001–743100 ==
Designation			Discovery			Properties		Ref
Permanent	Provisional	Named after	Date	Site	Discoverer(s)	Category	Diam.	Ref
743001	2008 DQ_{15}	—	January 11, 2008	Mount Lemmon	Mount Lemmon Survey	·	1.3 km	MPC · JPL
743002	2008 DM_{19}	—	February 27, 2008	Kitt Peak	Spacewatch	·	640 m	MPC · JPL
743003	2008 DT_{37}	—	February 27, 2008	Mount Lemmon	Mount Lemmon Survey	·	1.4 km	MPC · JPL
743004	2008 DL_{42}	—	January 10, 2008	Kitt Peak	Spacewatch	EOS	1.6 km	MPC · JPL
743005	2008 DP_{62}	—	February 28, 2008	Mount Lemmon	Mount Lemmon Survey	·	1.6 km	MPC · JPL
743006	2008 DA_{64}	—	September 14, 2006	Catalina	CSS	·	730 m	MPC · JPL
743007	2008 DL_{71}	—	February 24, 2008	Mount Lemmon	Mount Lemmon Survey	·	2.4 km	MPC · JPL
743008	2008 DP_{72}	—	February 26, 2008	Mount Lemmon	Mount Lemmon Survey	·	1.4 km	MPC · JPL
743009	2008 DC_{77}	—	February 28, 2008	Mount Lemmon	Mount Lemmon Survey	·	1.3 km	MPC · JPL
743010	2008 DQ_{77}	—	February 28, 2008	Mount Lemmon	Mount Lemmon Survey	AGN	970 m	MPC · JPL
743011	2008 DV_{87}	—	February 7, 2008	Kitt Peak	Spacewatch	·	1.7 km	MPC · JPL
743012	2008 DQ_{90}	—	September 25, 2011	Haleakala	Pan-STARRS 1	·	2.4 km	MPC · JPL
743013	2008 DX_{90}	—	May 18, 2012	Mount Lemmon	Mount Lemmon Survey	PHO	740 m	MPC · JPL
743014	2008 DR_{91}	—	February 24, 2008	Mount Lemmon	Mount Lemmon Survey	HNS	900 m	MPC · JPL
743015	2008 DV_{91}	—	July 25, 2015	Haleakala	Pan-STARRS 1	·	1.6 km	MPC · JPL
743016	2008 DN_{92}	—	July 31, 2014	Haleakala	Pan-STARRS 1	H	420 m	MPC · JPL
743017	2008 DX_{92}	—	August 20, 2001	Cerro Tololo	Deep Ecliptic Survey	PAD	1.2 km	MPC · JPL
743018	2008 DB_{93}	—	August 27, 2011	Haleakala	Pan-STARRS 1	(260)	3.7 km	MPC · JPL
743019	2008 DQ_{93}	—	August 19, 2010	XuYi	PMO NEO Survey Program	·	1.5 km	MPC · JPL
743020	2008 DE_{94}	—	August 27, 2013	Haleakala	Pan-STARRS 1	V	550 m	MPC · JPL
743021	2008 DS_{95}	—	February 26, 2008	Mount Lemmon	Mount Lemmon Survey	V	570 m	MPC · JPL
743022	2008 EM_{20}	—	March 2, 2008	Mount Lemmon	Mount Lemmon Survey	·	2.8 km	MPC · JPL
743023	2008 EO_{20}	—	March 2, 2008	Mount Lemmon	Mount Lemmon Survey	·	2.0 km	MPC · JPL
743024	2008 EW_{23}	—	March 3, 2008	Mount Lemmon	Mount Lemmon Survey	·	2.4 km	MPC · JPL
743025	2008 EY_{23}	—	February 18, 2008	Mount Lemmon	Mount Lemmon Survey	·	1.3 km	MPC · JPL
743026	2008 EJ_{24}	—	March 3, 2008	Mount Lemmon	Mount Lemmon Survey	·	2.4 km	MPC · JPL
743027	2008 ED_{25}	—	November 27, 2000	Apache Point	SDSS	·	580 m	MPC · JPL
743028	2008 EG_{25}	—	March 3, 2008	XuYi	PMO NEO Survey Program	·	1.6 km	MPC · JPL
743029	2008 EN_{28}	—	March 4, 2008	Mount Lemmon	Mount Lemmon Survey	·	1.4 km	MPC · JPL
743030	2008 ER_{36}	—	February 2, 2008	Kitt Peak	Spacewatch	·	1.5 km	MPC · JPL
743031	2008 EN_{37}	—	January 11, 2008	Kitt Peak	Spacewatch	·	690 m	MPC · JPL
743032	2008 ES_{37}	—	February 7, 2008	Kitt Peak	Spacewatch	·	1.1 km	MPC · JPL
743033	2008 ES_{41}	—	February 9, 2008	Mount Lemmon	Mount Lemmon Survey	JUN	930 m	MPC · JPL
743034	2008 EN_{43}	—	March 5, 2008	Mount Lemmon	Mount Lemmon Survey	·	1.2 km	MPC · JPL
743035	2008 ET_{48}	—	December 19, 2007	Mount Lemmon	Mount Lemmon Survey	EUN	940 m	MPC · JPL
743036	2008 EY_{53}	—	March 6, 2008	Mount Lemmon	Mount Lemmon Survey	·	670 m	MPC · JPL
743037	2008 EO_{58}	—	February 2, 2008	Kitt Peak	Spacewatch	·	1.3 km	MPC · JPL
743038	2008 EV_{60}	—	March 8, 2008	Mount Lemmon	Mount Lemmon Survey	·	2.4 km	MPC · JPL
743039	2008 EH_{61}	—	March 9, 2008	Mount Lemmon	Mount Lemmon Survey	·	770 m	MPC · JPL
743040	2008 ET_{63}	—	March 9, 2008	Kitt Peak	Spacewatch	·	960 m	MPC · JPL
743041	2008 EO_{69}	—	February 2, 2008	Kitt Peak	Spacewatch	(895)	3.3 km	MPC · JPL
743042	2008 EO_{70}	—	January 30, 2008	Kitt Peak	Spacewatch	H	410 m	MPC · JPL
743043	2008 EX_{72}	—	February 13, 2008	Catalina	CSS	PHO	750 m	MPC · JPL
743044	2008 EE_{78}	—	March 7, 2008	Kitt Peak	Spacewatch	·	600 m	MPC · JPL
743045	2008 ER_{80}	—	February 9, 2008	Catalina	CSS	·	1.3 km	MPC · JPL
743046	2008 EL_{86}	—	February 28, 2008	Kitt Peak	Spacewatch	·	2.0 km	MPC · JPL
743047	2008 EC_{90}	—	February 11, 2008	Kitt Peak	Spacewatch	·	1.5 km	MPC · JPL
743048	2008 ET_{93}	—	March 2, 2008	Mount Lemmon	Mount Lemmon Survey	·	1.7 km	MPC · JPL
743049	2008 EQ_{98}	—	February 14, 2013	Catalina	CSS	·	1.8 km	MPC · JPL
743050	2008 EK_{102}	—	March 5, 2008	Mount Lemmon	Mount Lemmon Survey	·	1.8 km	MPC · JPL
743051	2008 EV_{102}	—	March 19, 2001	Kitt Peak	Spacewatch	·	680 m	MPC · JPL
743052	2008 EJ_{108}	—	February 8, 2008	Kitt Peak	Spacewatch	AGN	970 m	MPC · JPL
743053	2008 EQ_{112}	—	February 2, 2008	Mount Lemmon	Mount Lemmon Survey	·	990 m	MPC · JPL
743054	2008 EL_{115}	—	January 18, 2008	Mount Lemmon	Mount Lemmon Survey	·	660 m	MPC · JPL
743055	2008 EZ_{117}	—	February 13, 2008	Kitt Peak	Spacewatch	NYS	840 m	MPC · JPL
743056	2008 EL_{124}	—	February 12, 2008	Kitt Peak	Spacewatch	·	1.2 km	MPC · JPL
743057	2008 ES_{127}	—	March 6, 2008	Mount Lemmon	Mount Lemmon Survey	·	1.3 km	MPC · JPL
743058	2008 EB_{132}	—	March 11, 2008	Kitt Peak	Spacewatch	·	790 m	MPC · JPL
743059	2008 ES_{134}	—	February 28, 2008	Kitt Peak	Spacewatch	·	830 m	MPC · JPL
743060	2008 EY_{137}	—	March 11, 2008	Mount Lemmon	Mount Lemmon Survey	·	1.5 km	MPC · JPL
743061	2008 EQ_{139}	—	February 28, 2008	Kitt Peak	Spacewatch	·	1.7 km	MPC · JPL
743062 Dianabeșliu	2008 EJ_{145}	Dianabeșliu	March 12, 2008	La Silla	EURONEAR	·	770 m	MPC · JPL
743063	2008 EP_{151}	—	March 8, 2008	Kitt Peak	Spacewatch	·	1.6 km	MPC · JPL
743064	2008 EM_{159}	—	March 13, 2008	Kitt Peak	Spacewatch	·	2.4 km	MPC · JPL
743065	2008 ED_{167}	—	March 7, 2008	Mount Lemmon	Mount Lemmon Survey	·	1.8 km	MPC · JPL
743066	2008 EV_{168}	—	March 26, 2008	Mount Lemmon	Mount Lemmon Survey	NYS	860 m	MPC · JPL
743067	2008 EV_{173}	—	March 7, 2008	Kitt Peak	Spacewatch	NYS	770 m	MPC · JPL
743068	2008 EW_{173}	—	October 10, 2010	Kitt Peak	Spacewatch	·	1.0 km	MPC · JPL
743069	2008 EP_{174}	—	December 2, 2010	Mount Lemmon	Mount Lemmon Survey	·	590 m	MPC · JPL
743070	2008 ET_{174}	—	March 6, 2008	Mount Lemmon	Mount Lemmon Survey	V	510 m	MPC · JPL
743071	2008 EA_{175}	—	March 10, 2008	Mount Lemmon	Mount Lemmon Survey	·	1.5 km	MPC · JPL
743072	2008 EY_{175}	—	January 27, 2012	Mount Lemmon	Mount Lemmon Survey	·	1.4 km	MPC · JPL
743073	2008 ER_{177}	—	December 10, 2010	Kitt Peak	Spacewatch	·	780 m	MPC · JPL
743074	2008 EE_{178}	—	March 8, 2008	Mount Lemmon	Mount Lemmon Survey	·	580 m	MPC · JPL
743075	2008 ET_{178}	—	November 15, 2010	Mount Lemmon	Mount Lemmon Survey	·	530 m	MPC · JPL
743076	2008 EA_{181}	—	March 8, 2008	Mount Lemmon	Mount Lemmon Survey	·	1.4 km	MPC · JPL
743077	2008 EE_{181}	—	March 28, 2012	Kitt Peak	Spacewatch	MAS	570 m	MPC · JPL
743078	2008 EL_{181}	—	December 13, 2015	Haleakala	Pan-STARRS 1	·	1.3 km	MPC · JPL
743079	2008 EN_{181}	—	January 22, 2015	Haleakala	Pan-STARRS 1	·	850 m	MPC · JPL
743080	2008 EE_{182}	—	January 26, 2012	Haleakala	Pan-STARRS 1	·	1.4 km	MPC · JPL
743081	2008 EN_{182}	—	March 6, 2008	Mount Lemmon	Mount Lemmon Survey	·	1.2 km	MPC · JPL
743082	2008 EX_{183}	—	March 2, 2008	Mount Lemmon	Mount Lemmon Survey	V	440 m	MPC · JPL
743083	2008 EG_{184}	—	October 5, 2014	Haleakala	Pan-STARRS 1	H	410 m	MPC · JPL
743084	2008 EZ_{185}	—	March 5, 2013	Haleakala	Pan-STARRS 1	·	1.4 km	MPC · JPL
743085	2008 EU_{186}	—	January 4, 2016	Haleakala	Pan-STARRS 1	·	1.3 km	MPC · JPL
743086	2008 EH_{187}	—	November 8, 2010	Mount Lemmon	Mount Lemmon Survey	·	1.0 km	MPC · JPL
743087	2008 EB_{189}	—	October 18, 2011	Kitt Peak	Spacewatch	·	1.6 km	MPC · JPL
743088	2008 ET_{190}	—	March 10, 2008	Mount Lemmon	Mount Lemmon Survey	·	530 m	MPC · JPL
743089	2008 EA_{192}	—	March 1, 2008	Kitt Peak	Spacewatch	·	860 m	MPC · JPL
743090	2008 FT_{10}	—	February 24, 2008	Kitt Peak	Spacewatch	·	1.1 km	MPC · JPL
743091	2008 FC_{19}	—	February 29, 2008	Kitt Peak	Spacewatch	H	370 m	MPC · JPL
743092	2008 FK_{31}	—	January 30, 2008	Mount Lemmon	Mount Lemmon Survey	·	1.8 km	MPC · JPL
743093	2008 FX_{31}	—	March 28, 2008	Mount Lemmon	Mount Lemmon Survey	·	1.3 km	MPC · JPL
743094	2008 FS_{32}	—	March 28, 2008	Mount Lemmon	Mount Lemmon Survey	·	2.4 km	MPC · JPL
743095	2008 FJ_{34}	—	March 28, 2008	Mount Lemmon	Mount Lemmon Survey	·	950 m	MPC · JPL
743096	2008 FA_{36}	—	February 10, 2008	Mount Lemmon	Mount Lemmon Survey	·	1.4 km	MPC · JPL
743097	2008 FR_{39}	—	March 10, 2008	Kitt Peak	Spacewatch	·	620 m	MPC · JPL
743098	2008 FE_{53}	—	March 28, 2008	Mount Lemmon	Mount Lemmon Survey	·	740 m	MPC · JPL
743099	2008 FF_{53}	—	March 13, 2008	Kitt Peak	Spacewatch	·	1.8 km	MPC · JPL
743100	2008 FU_{62}	—	March 27, 2008	Kitt Peak	Spacewatch	·	1.7 km	MPC · JPL

== 743101–743200 ==
back to top

Designation			Discovery			Properties		Ref
Permanent	Provisional	Named after	Date	Site	Discoverer(s)	Category	Diam.	Ref
743101	2008 FU_{72}	—	March 30, 2008	Kitt Peak	Spacewatch	·	800 m	MPC · JPL
743102	2008 FV_{85}	—	February 28, 2008	Mount Lemmon	Mount Lemmon Survey	·	600 m	MPC · JPL
743103	2008 FO_{95}	—	March 29, 2008	Mount Lemmon	Mount Lemmon Survey	·	650 m	MPC · JPL
743104	2008 FC_{100}	—	March 30, 2008	Kitt Peak	Spacewatch	·	1.4 km	MPC · JPL
743105	2008 FQ_{106}	—	March 10, 2008	Kitt Peak	Spacewatch	·	860 m	MPC · JPL
743106	2008 FC_{114}	—	March 31, 2008	Kitt Peak	Spacewatch	H	390 m	MPC · JPL
743107	2008 FC_{122}	—	January 10, 2008	Kitt Peak	Spacewatch	JUN	1.1 km	MPC · JPL
743108	2008 FO_{124}	—	March 30, 2008	Kitt Peak	Spacewatch	·	640 m	MPC · JPL
743109	2008 FV_{124}	—	March 30, 2008	Kitt Peak	Spacewatch	·	1.5 km	MPC · JPL
743110	2008 FJ_{134}	—	March 29, 2008	Kitt Peak	Spacewatch	MRX	800 m	MPC · JPL
743111	2008 FM_{135}	—	March 31, 2008	Mount Lemmon	Mount Lemmon Survey	·	1.6 km	MPC · JPL
743112	2008 FJ_{139}	—	March 31, 2008	Mount Lemmon	Mount Lemmon Survey	·	770 m	MPC · JPL
743113	2008 FZ_{139}	—	March 26, 2008	Mount Lemmon	Mount Lemmon Survey	·	590 m	MPC · JPL
743114	2008 FL_{140}	—	November 17, 2006	Mount Lemmon	Mount Lemmon Survey	·	1.5 km	MPC · JPL
743115	2008 FJ_{141}	—	March 31, 2008	Kitt Peak	Spacewatch	·	2.0 km	MPC · JPL
743116	2008 FP_{141}	—	April 21, 2012	Mount Lemmon	Mount Lemmon Survey	NYS	890 m	MPC · JPL
743117	2008 FU_{141}	—	March 28, 2008	Kitt Peak	Spacewatch	·	1.3 km	MPC · JPL
743118	2008 FM_{143}	—	March 31, 2008	Mount Lemmon	Mount Lemmon Survey	·	1.5 km	MPC · JPL
743119	2008 FP_{144}	—	December 29, 2011	Mount Lemmon	Mount Lemmon Survey	·	1.2 km	MPC · JPL
743120	2008 FM_{146}	—	March 30, 2008	Kitt Peak	Spacewatch	NYS	880 m	MPC · JPL
743121	2008 FO_{146}	—	March 29, 2008	Kitt Peak	Spacewatch	NYS	920 m	MPC · JPL
743122	2008 GH_{8}	—	March 29, 2008	Mount Lemmon	Mount Lemmon Survey	·	1.7 km	MPC · JPL
743123	2008 GD_{9}	—	April 1, 2008	Kitt Peak	Spacewatch	L5	6.2 km	MPC · JPL
743124	2008 GO_{23}	—	March 4, 2008	Mount Lemmon	Mount Lemmon Survey	·	880 m	MPC · JPL
743125	2008 GX_{41}	—	April 4, 2008	Kitt Peak	Spacewatch	·	590 m	MPC · JPL
743126	2008 GV_{43}	—	March 11, 2008	Kitt Peak	Spacewatch	·	590 m	MPC · JPL
743127	2008 GK_{44}	—	April 4, 2008	Mount Lemmon	Mount Lemmon Survey	·	870 m	MPC · JPL
743128	2008 GO_{45}	—	April 4, 2008	Mount Lemmon	Mount Lemmon Survey	L5	7.0 km	MPC · JPL
743129	2008 GF_{56}	—	April 5, 2008	Mount Lemmon	Mount Lemmon Survey	·	1.6 km	MPC · JPL
743130	2008 GG_{72}	—	March 27, 2008	Mount Lemmon	Mount Lemmon Survey	·	950 m	MPC · JPL
743131	2008 GQ_{74}	—	March 30, 2008	Kitt Peak	Spacewatch	·	1.7 km	MPC · JPL
743132	2008 GH_{75}	—	March 30, 2008	Kitt Peak	Spacewatch	·	1.0 km	MPC · JPL
743133	2008 GS_{79}	—	April 7, 2008	Kitt Peak	Spacewatch	NYS	820 m	MPC · JPL
743134	2008 GD_{81}	—	April 7, 2008	Kitt Peak	Spacewatch	NYS	930 m	MPC · JPL
743135	2008 GF_{85}	—	March 12, 2008	Kitt Peak	Spacewatch	·	1.5 km	MPC · JPL
743136	2008 GL_{85}	—	April 8, 2008	Mount Lemmon	Mount Lemmon Survey	·	1.4 km	MPC · JPL
743137	2008 GY_{91}	—	April 6, 2008	Mount Lemmon	Mount Lemmon Survey	PHO	700 m	MPC · JPL
743138	2008 GZ_{92}	—	November 23, 2006	Kitt Peak	Spacewatch	·	1.5 km	MPC · JPL
743139	2008 GU_{94}	—	November 16, 2006	Mount Lemmon	Mount Lemmon Survey	NEM	1.8 km	MPC · JPL
743140	2008 GE_{100}	—	March 31, 2008	Kitt Peak	Spacewatch	·	1.2 km	MPC · JPL
743141	2008 GL_{110}	—	March 26, 2003	Apache Point	SDSS	·	2.9 km	MPC · JPL
743142	2008 GH_{116}	—	April 11, 2008	Mount Lemmon	Mount Lemmon Survey	·	1.1 km	MPC · JPL
743143	2008 GC_{117}	—	March 30, 2008	Kitt Peak	Spacewatch	DOR	1.8 km	MPC · JPL
743144	2008 GR_{124}	—	July 4, 2005	Mount Lemmon	Mount Lemmon Survey	·	540 m	MPC · JPL
743145	2008 GB_{125}	—	March 11, 2008	Mount Lemmon	Mount Lemmon Survey	·	1.4 km	MPC · JPL
743146	2008 GN_{137}	—	April 6, 2008	Kitt Peak	Spacewatch	·	1.6 km	MPC · JPL
743147	2008 GL_{141}	—	April 14, 2008	Mount Lemmon	Mount Lemmon Survey	L5	7.1 km	MPC · JPL
743148	2008 GR_{148}	—	May 30, 2009	Mount Lemmon	Mount Lemmon Survey	L5	9.0 km	MPC · JPL
743149	2008 GW_{151}	—	July 11, 2016	Haleakala	Pan-STARRS 1	·	1.0 km	MPC · JPL
743150	2008 GZ_{151}	—	April 13, 2008	Mount Lemmon	Mount Lemmon Survey	·	1.7 km	MPC · JPL
743151	2008 GN_{152}	—	January 18, 2013	Westfield	R. Holmes	H	470 m	MPC · JPL
743152	2008 GE_{155}	—	October 11, 2010	Mount Lemmon	Mount Lemmon Survey	WIT	740 m	MPC · JPL
743153	2008 GL_{155}	—	October 2, 2013	Kitt Peak	Spacewatch	L5	8.8 km	MPC · JPL
743154	2008 GP_{155}	—	December 18, 2001	Socorro	LINEAR	·	1.6 km	MPC · JPL
743155	2008 GX_{158}	—	October 28, 2010	Mount Lemmon	Mount Lemmon Survey	·	1.6 km	MPC · JPL
743156	2008 GB_{159}	—	October 23, 2009	Mount Lemmon	Mount Lemmon Survey	·	1.7 km	MPC · JPL
743157	2008 GE_{159}	—	November 21, 2014	Haleakala	Pan-STARRS 1	·	1.3 km	MPC · JPL
743158	2008 GT_{159}	—	August 3, 2014	Haleakala	Pan-STARRS 1	·	1.4 km	MPC · JPL
743159	2008 GQ_{161}	—	February 23, 2012	Kitt Peak	Spacewatch	EUN	970 m	MPC · JPL
743160	2008 GE_{167}	—	April 14, 2008	Mount Lemmon	Mount Lemmon Survey	·	1.4 km	MPC · JPL
743161	2008 GV_{168}	—	April 15, 2008	Kitt Peak	Spacewatch	L5	7.2 km	MPC · JPL
743162	2008 GE_{169}	—	April 5, 2008	Kitt Peak	Spacewatch	L5	6.9 km	MPC · JPL
743163	2008 HO_{2}	—	March 31, 2008	Mount Lemmon	Mount Lemmon Survey	PHO	750 m	MPC · JPL
743164	2008 HN_{18}	—	March 1, 2008	Catalina	CSS	·	1.8 km	MPC · JPL
743165	2008 HT_{24}	—	April 11, 2008	Mount Lemmon	Mount Lemmon Survey	·	830 m	MPC · JPL
743166	2008 HE_{25}	—	April 27, 2008	Mount Lemmon	Mount Lemmon Survey	·	840 m	MPC · JPL
743167	2008 HJ_{28}	—	April 15, 2008	Mount Lemmon	Mount Lemmon Survey	·	1.6 km	MPC · JPL
743168	2008 HT_{30}	—	April 29, 2008	Mount Lemmon	Mount Lemmon Survey	·	1.3 km	MPC · JPL
743169	2008 HQ_{39}	—	March 10, 2008	Kitt Peak	Spacewatch	·	840 m	MPC · JPL
743170	2008 HU_{42}	—	March 28, 2008	Kitt Peak	Spacewatch	NYS	610 m	MPC · JPL
743171	2008 HH_{44}	—	April 15, 2008	Kitt Peak	Spacewatch	·	540 m	MPC · JPL
743172	2008 HW_{47}	—	April 6, 2008	Mount Lemmon	Mount Lemmon Survey	L5	6.1 km	MPC · JPL
743173	2008 HQ_{48}	—	April 29, 2008	Kitt Peak	Spacewatch	·	1.7 km	MPC · JPL
743174	2008 HD_{49}	—	April 29, 2008	Mount Lemmon	Mount Lemmon Survey	·	550 m	MPC · JPL
743175	2008 HG_{49}	—	April 29, 2008	Mount Lemmon	Mount Lemmon Survey	MAR	710 m	MPC · JPL
743176	2008 HW_{65}	—	April 1, 2008	Mount Lemmon	Mount Lemmon Survey	·	1.8 km	MPC · JPL
743177	2008 HP_{71}	—	August 9, 2013	Kitt Peak	Spacewatch	·	870 m	MPC · JPL
743178	2008 HV_{71}	—	May 28, 2012	Mount Lemmon	Mount Lemmon Survey	·	840 m	MPC · JPL
743179	2008 HY_{71}	—	April 25, 2008	Kitt Peak	Spacewatch	PHO	650 m	MPC · JPL
743180	2008 HJ_{74}	—	April 24, 2008	Mount Lemmon	Mount Lemmon Survey	NYS	790 m	MPC · JPL
743181	2008 HS_{74}	—	April 29, 2008	Mount Lemmon	Mount Lemmon Survey	·	1.6 km	MPC · JPL
743182	2008 HV_{74}	—	August 6, 2016	Haleakala	Pan-STARRS 1	·	1.0 km	MPC · JPL
743183	2008 HQ_{75}	—	October 11, 2012	Haleakala	Pan-STARRS 1	L5	7.1 km	MPC · JPL
743184	2008 HP_{76}	—	April 29, 2008	Kitt Peak	Spacewatch	·	1.5 km	MPC · JPL
743185	2008 JJ_{23}	—	April 3, 2008	Mount Lemmon	Mount Lemmon Survey	GEF	990 m	MPC · JPL
743186	2008 JZ_{41}	—	May 8, 2008	Mount Lemmon	Mount Lemmon Survey	·	1.5 km	MPC · JPL
743187	2008 JC_{43}	—	September 29, 2013	Mount Lemmon	Mount Lemmon Survey	PHO	750 m	MPC · JPL
743188	2008 JS_{43}	—	January 13, 2008	Kitt Peak	Spacewatch	JUN	1.1 km	MPC · JPL
743189	2008 JB_{44}	—	February 5, 2011	Mount Lemmon	Mount Lemmon Survey	·	680 m	MPC · JPL
743190	2008 JO_{44}	—	May 5, 2008	Mount Lemmon	Mount Lemmon Survey	L5	7.5 km	MPC · JPL
743191	2008 JS_{44}	—	April 7, 2008	Mount Lemmon	Mount Lemmon Survey	·	1.3 km	MPC · JPL
743192	2008 JE_{46}	—	October 13, 2010	Mount Lemmon	Mount Lemmon Survey	·	1.7 km	MPC · JPL
743193	2008 JT_{46}	—	May 5, 2008	Mount Lemmon	Mount Lemmon Survey	·	570 m	MPC · JPL
743194	2008 JY_{46}	—	March 28, 2008	Kitt Peak	Spacewatch	·	950 m	MPC · JPL
743195	2008 JB_{49}	—	May 2, 2008	Mount Lemmon	Mount Lemmon Survey	·	730 m	MPC · JPL
743196	2008 JH_{50}	—	May 13, 2008	Kitt Peak	Spacewatch	L5	7.2 km	MPC · JPL
743197	2008 JR_{51}	—	May 3, 2008	Kitt Peak	Spacewatch	L5	8.1 km	MPC · JPL
743198	2008 KY	—	May 8, 2008	Kitt Peak	Spacewatch	·	1.8 km	MPC · JPL
743199	2008 KO_{2}	—	May 27, 2008	Kitt Peak	Spacewatch	L5	8.3 km	MPC · JPL
743200	2008 KC_{7}	—	May 3, 2008	Mount Lemmon	Mount Lemmon Survey	PHO	880 m	MPC · JPL

== 743201–743300 ==
back to top

Designation			Discovery			Properties		Ref
Permanent	Provisional	Named after	Date	Site	Discoverer(s)	Category	Diam.	Ref
743201	2008 KD_{27}	—	March 29, 2008	Kitt Peak	Spacewatch	·	1.8 km	MPC · JPL
743202	2008 KR_{32}	—	May 29, 2008	Kitt Peak	Spacewatch	·	1.5 km	MPC · JPL
743203	2008 KK_{37}	—	May 29, 2008	Mount Lemmon	Mount Lemmon Survey	L5	7.8 km	MPC · JPL
743204	2008 KY_{45}	—	May 14, 2018	Mount Lemmon	Mount Lemmon Survey	·	1.5 km	MPC · JPL
743205	2008 KZ_{45}	—	March 24, 2015	Kitt Peak	Spacewatch	·	700 m	MPC · JPL
743206	2008 KS_{47}	—	October 1, 2014	Haleakala	Pan-STARRS 1	·	1.6 km	MPC · JPL
743207	2008 LL_{6}	—	May 7, 2008	Kitt Peak	Spacewatch	·	1.5 km	MPC · JPL
743208	2008 LE_{11}	—	June 6, 2008	Kitt Peak	Spacewatch	·	1.7 km	MPC · JPL
743209	2008 LM_{13}	—	May 13, 2008	Mount Lemmon	Mount Lemmon Survey	·	2.8 km	MPC · JPL
743210	2008 LE_{19}	—	February 5, 2011	Haleakala	Pan-STARRS 1	PHO	660 m	MPC · JPL
743211	2008 LQ_{20}	—	August 13, 2012	Haleakala	Pan-STARRS 1	NYS	890 m	MPC · JPL
743212	2008 LW_{20}	—	July 13, 2013	Haleakala	Pan-STARRS 1	·	1.7 km	MPC · JPL
743213	2008 MR_{1}	—	June 30, 2008	Socorro	LINEAR	AMO	720 m	MPC · JPL
743214	2008 MX_{3}	—	June 2, 2008	Mount Lemmon	Mount Lemmon Survey	·	900 m	MPC · JPL
743215	2008 MU_{5}	—	April 18, 2015	Mount Lemmon	Mount Lemmon Survey	·	1.0 km	MPC · JPL
743216	2008 NE	—	July 1, 2008	Charleston	R. Holmes	·	4.4 km	MPC · JPL
743217	2008 OE	—	July 25, 2008	Siding Spring	SSS	·	2.3 km	MPC · JPL
743218	2008 OG_{1}	—	July 26, 2008	Pla D'Arguines	R. Ferrando, Ferrando, M.	·	1.4 km	MPC · JPL
743219	2008 OS_{8}	—	July 25, 2008	Siding Spring	SSS	JUN	1.2 km	MPC · JPL
743220	2008 OM_{27}	—	August 26, 2012	Haleakala	Pan-STARRS 1	·	980 m	MPC · JPL
743221	2008 OF_{28}	—	March 17, 2012	Mount Lemmon	Mount Lemmon Survey	·	1.5 km	MPC · JPL
743222	2008 OR_{28}	—	April 25, 2015	Haleakala	Pan-STARRS 1	·	900 m	MPC · JPL
743223	2008 OC_{29}	—	November 17, 2014	Haleakala	Pan-STARRS 1	615	1.2 km	MPC · JPL
743224	2008 OA_{32}	—	July 30, 2008	Mount Lemmon	Mount Lemmon Survey	·	2.4 km	MPC · JPL
743225	2008 PX_{5}	—	July 29, 2008	Mount Lemmon	Mount Lemmon Survey	·	980 m	MPC · JPL
743226	2008 PK_{10}	—	July 29, 2008	Kitt Peak	Spacewatch	·	720 m	MPC · JPL
743227	2008 PR_{12}	—	August 1, 2008	Dauban	C. Rinner, F. Kugel	·	1.7 km	MPC · JPL
743228	2008 PF_{19}	—	August 7, 2008	Kitt Peak	Spacewatch	MAS	490 m	MPC · JPL
743229	2008 PQ_{22}	—	January 16, 2005	Mauna Kea	Veillet, C.	TIR	2.6 km	MPC · JPL
743230	2008 PH_{23}	—	August 7, 2008	Kitt Peak	Spacewatch	·	850 m	MPC · JPL
743231	2008 QL	—	August 20, 2008	Tiki	Teamo, N.	·	1.7 km	MPC · JPL
743232	2008 QO	—	August 21, 2008	Marly	Kocher, F.	·	960 m	MPC · JPL
743233	2008 QW_{1}	—	August 24, 2008	La Sagra	OAM	·	1.3 km	MPC · JPL
743234	2008 QP_{7}	—	August 25, 2008	Hibiscus	Teamo, N., S. F. Hönig	NYS	1.1 km	MPC · JPL
743235	2008 QK_{14}	—	July 29, 2008	Kitt Peak	Spacewatch	·	1.5 km	MPC · JPL
743236	2008 QW_{14}	—	August 25, 2008	Črni Vrh	Matičič, S.	·	1.5 km	MPC · JPL
743237	2008 QY_{25}	—	July 30, 2008	Kitt Peak	Spacewatch	·	1.6 km	MPC · JPL
743238	2008 QU_{28}	—	July 29, 2008	Kitt Peak	Spacewatch	·	960 m	MPC · JPL
743239	2008 QO_{31}	—	August 30, 2008	Socorro	LINEAR	·	1.8 km	MPC · JPL
743240	2008 QF_{33}	—	August 29, 2008	Lulin	LUSS	·	880 m	MPC · JPL
743241	2008 QN_{34}	—	August 28, 2008	Lake Tekapo	A. C. Gilmore	H	510 m	MPC · JPL
743242	2008 QN_{39}	—	August 24, 2008	Kitt Peak	Spacewatch	·	1.3 km	MPC · JPL
743243	2008 QO_{49}	—	August 7, 2008	Kitt Peak	Spacewatch	·	950 m	MPC · JPL
743244	2008 QU_{49}	—	February 25, 2011	Mount Lemmon	Mount Lemmon Survey	URS	2.5 km	MPC · JPL
743245	2008 QU_{50}	—	August 24, 2008	Črni Vrh	Skvarč, J.	·	2.2 km	MPC · JPL
743246	2008 QA_{51}	—	August 21, 2008	Kitt Peak	Spacewatch	3:2	4.7 km	MPC · JPL
743247	2008 QE_{51}	—	August 21, 2008	Kitt Peak	Spacewatch	·	2.1 km	MPC · JPL
743248	2008 RR_{1}	—	September 3, 2008	Kachina	Hobart, J.	MAR	670 m	MPC · JPL
743249	2008 RD_{27}	—	September 30, 2003	Kitt Peak	Spacewatch	·	2.3 km	MPC · JPL
743250	2008 RG_{28}	—	September 2, 2008	La Sagra	OAM	H	530 m	MPC · JPL
743251	2008 RN_{29}	—	September 2, 2008	Kitt Peak	Spacewatch	·	1.9 km	MPC · JPL
743252	2008 RV_{32}	—	September 2, 2008	Kitt Peak	Spacewatch	·	620 m	MPC · JPL
743253	2008 RD_{36}	—	September 2, 2008	Kitt Peak	Spacewatch	·	1.0 km	MPC · JPL
743254	2008 RH_{36}	—	September 2, 2008	Kitt Peak	Spacewatch	·	1 km	MPC · JPL
743255	2008 RE_{38}	—	September 2, 2008	Kitt Peak	Spacewatch	EUP	2.5 km	MPC · JPL
743256	2008 RJ_{54}	—	September 3, 2008	Kitt Peak	Spacewatch	·	790 m	MPC · JPL
743257	2008 RM_{60}	—	September 4, 2008	Kitt Peak	Spacewatch	V	530 m	MPC · JPL
743258	2008 RN_{64}	—	August 23, 2008	Kitt Peak	Spacewatch	·	1.2 km	MPC · JPL
743259	2008 RP_{64}	—	September 4, 2008	Kitt Peak	Spacewatch	EUN	570 m	MPC · JPL
743260	2008 RP_{66}	—	September 4, 2008	Kitt Peak	Spacewatch	·	1.1 km	MPC · JPL
743261	2008 RJ_{69}	—	September 4, 2008	Kitt Peak	Spacewatch	·	1.5 km	MPC · JPL
743262	2008 RX_{75}	—	September 6, 2008	Mount Lemmon	Mount Lemmon Survey	·	1.5 km	MPC · JPL
743263	2008 RM_{79}	—	September 1, 2008	La Sagra	OAM	·	1.7 km	MPC · JPL
743264	2008 RW_{81}	—	September 4, 2008	Kitt Peak	Spacewatch	·	1.2 km	MPC · JPL
743265	2008 RZ_{82}	—	September 4, 2008	Kitt Peak	Spacewatch	·	1.6 km	MPC · JPL
743266	2008 RR_{88}	—	September 5, 2008	Kitt Peak	Spacewatch	(5)	1.1 km	MPC · JPL
743267	2008 RX_{97}	—	September 7, 2008	Mount Lemmon	Mount Lemmon Survey	(5)	1.1 km	MPC · JPL
743268	2008 RP_{98}	—	September 5, 2008	Kitt Peak	Spacewatch	V	560 m	MPC · JPL
743269	2008 RN_{103}	—	September 5, 2008	Kitt Peak	Spacewatch	·	1.8 km	MPC · JPL
743270	2008 RF_{111}	—	September 4, 2008	Kitt Peak	Spacewatch	·	1.1 km	MPC · JPL
743271	2008 RU_{112}	—	September 5, 2008	Kitt Peak	Spacewatch	·	1.6 km	MPC · JPL
743272	2008 RH_{115}	—	September 7, 2008	Mount Lemmon	Mount Lemmon Survey	·	2.2 km	MPC · JPL
743273	2008 RU_{139}	—	September 7, 2008	Mount Lemmon	Mount Lemmon Survey	·	840 m	MPC · JPL
743274	2008 RV_{150}	—	September 6, 2008	Mount Lemmon	Mount Lemmon Survey	·	2.7 km	MPC · JPL
743275	2008 RX_{152}	—	September 7, 2008	Mount Lemmon	Mount Lemmon Survey	NEM	1.8 km	MPC · JPL
743276	2008 RT_{157}	—	September 6, 2008	Mount Lemmon	Mount Lemmon Survey	EOS	1.7 km	MPC · JPL
743277	2008 RW_{157}	—	September 4, 2008	Kitt Peak	Spacewatch	·	1.4 km	MPC · JPL
743278	2008 RJ_{161}	—	December 8, 2014	Haleakala	Pan-STARRS 1	T_{j} (2.99)	2.5 km	MPC · JPL
743279	2008 RV_{165}	—	September 5, 2008	Kitt Peak	Spacewatch	·	1.8 km	MPC · JPL
743280	2008 RY_{165}	—	September 5, 2008	Kitt Peak	Spacewatch	·	890 m	MPC · JPL
743281	2008 RD_{172}	—	September 6, 2008	Kitt Peak	Spacewatch	·	630 m	MPC · JPL
743282	2008 RA_{174}	—	September 4, 2008	Kitt Peak	Spacewatch	·	600 m	MPC · JPL
743283	2008 RO_{179}	—	September 3, 2008	Kitt Peak	Spacewatch	·	1.1 km	MPC · JPL
743284	2008 RQ_{179}	—	March 11, 2007	Mount Lemmon	Mount Lemmon Survey	·	1.3 km	MPC · JPL
743285	2008 SB_{2}	—	September 22, 2008	Hibiscus	Teamo, N.	·	590 m	MPC · JPL
743286	2008 SP_{18}	—	July 30, 2008	Kitt Peak	Spacewatch	NYS	910 m	MPC · JPL
743287	2008 SN_{24}	—	September 28, 2003	Kitt Peak	Spacewatch	·	1.8 km	MPC · JPL
743288	2008 ST_{32}	—	September 20, 2008	Kitt Peak	Spacewatch	·	2.7 km	MPC · JPL
743289	2008 SQ_{38}	—	September 20, 2008	Kitt Peak	Spacewatch	·	3.2 km	MPC · JPL
743290	2008 SF_{39}	—	September 20, 2008	Kitt Peak	Spacewatch	MAS	610 m	MPC · JPL
743291	2008 SU_{44}	—	September 9, 2008	Mount Lemmon	Mount Lemmon Survey	·	2.3 km	MPC · JPL
743292	2008 SB_{48}	—	September 4, 2008	Kitt Peak	Spacewatch	·	1.6 km	MPC · JPL
743293	2008 ST_{51}	—	September 20, 2008	Kitt Peak	Spacewatch	(5)	1.1 km	MPC · JPL
743294	2008 SA_{53}	—	September 2, 2008	Kitt Peak	Spacewatch	·	2.6 km	MPC · JPL
743295	2008 SH_{59}	—	September 20, 2008	Kitt Peak	Spacewatch	·	850 m	MPC · JPL
743296	2008 SF_{72}	—	September 22, 2008	Catalina	CSS	·	1.1 km	MPC · JPL
743297	2008 SO_{77}	—	September 23, 2008	Mount Lemmon	Mount Lemmon Survey	·	2.0 km	MPC · JPL
743298	2008 SY_{77}	—	September 27, 2003	Kitt Peak	Spacewatch	KOR	1.1 km	MPC · JPL
743299	2008 SF_{80}	—	September 23, 2008	Kitt Peak	Spacewatch	·	1.9 km	MPC · JPL
743300	2008 SJ_{86}	—	September 20, 2008	Kitt Peak	Spacewatch	·	1.2 km	MPC · JPL

== 743301–743400 ==
back to top

Designation			Discovery			Properties		Ref
Permanent	Provisional	Named after	Date	Site	Discoverer(s)	Category	Diam.	Ref
743301	2008 SG_{96}	—	September 21, 2008	Kitt Peak	Spacewatch	·	1.1 km	MPC · JPL
743302	2008 SS_{96}	—	September 9, 2008	Mount Lemmon	Mount Lemmon Survey	·	1.9 km	MPC · JPL
743303	2008 ST_{119}	—	August 16, 2002	Palomar	NEAT	·	1.8 km	MPC · JPL
743304	2008 SZ_{119}	—	September 22, 2008	Mount Lemmon	Mount Lemmon Survey	THM	1.7 km	MPC · JPL
743305	2008 SF_{127}	—	September 7, 2008	Mount Lemmon	Mount Lemmon Survey	·	2.5 km	MPC · JPL
743306	2008 SP_{130}	—	September 22, 2008	Kitt Peak	Spacewatch	·	2.0 km	MPC · JPL
743307	2008 SN_{137}	—	September 23, 2008	Kitt Peak	Spacewatch	·	800 m	MPC · JPL
743308	2008 SC_{142}	—	September 24, 2008	Mount Lemmon	Mount Lemmon Survey	·	2.4 km	MPC · JPL
743309	2008 SM_{146}	—	September 23, 2008	Kitt Peak	Spacewatch	·	660 m	MPC · JPL
743310	2008 SP_{150}	—	September 3, 2008	Kitt Peak	Spacewatch	H	390 m	MPC · JPL
743311	2008 SY_{168}	—	September 2, 2008	Kitt Peak	Spacewatch	·	490 m	MPC · JPL
743312	2008 SA_{169}	—	September 6, 2008	Kitt Peak	Spacewatch	PHO	900 m	MPC · JPL
743313	2008 SP_{173}	—	September 22, 2008	Kitt Peak	Spacewatch	·	680 m	MPC · JPL
743314	2008 SW_{174}	—	September 23, 2008	Kitt Peak	Spacewatch	H	420 m	MPC · JPL
743315	2008 SX_{174}	—	September 23, 2008	Kitt Peak	Spacewatch	·	1.3 km	MPC · JPL
743316	2008 SH_{175}	—	September 23, 2008	Kitt Peak	Spacewatch	·	2.1 km	MPC · JPL
743317	2008 SO_{175}	—	September 5, 2008	Kitt Peak	Spacewatch	·	2.0 km	MPC · JPL
743318	2008 SD_{180}	—	September 24, 2008	Mount Lemmon	Mount Lemmon Survey	·	2.9 km	MPC · JPL
743319	2008 SE_{181}	—	September 24, 2008	Kitt Peak	Spacewatch	·	890 m	MPC · JPL
743320	2008 SN_{182}	—	September 24, 2008	Kitt Peak	Spacewatch	·	690 m	MPC · JPL
743321	2008 SU_{182}	—	September 24, 2008	Mount Lemmon	Mount Lemmon Survey	·	2.0 km	MPC · JPL
743322	2008 SB_{186}	—	September 9, 2008	Kitt Peak	Spacewatch	·	1.7 km	MPC · JPL
743323	2008 SF_{189}	—	September 7, 2008	Mount Lemmon	Mount Lemmon Survey	·	2.7 km	MPC · JPL
743324	2008 SR_{189}	—	September 9, 2008	Mount Lemmon	Mount Lemmon Survey	·	1.0 km	MPC · JPL
743325	2008 SN_{191}	—	September 5, 2008	Kitt Peak	Spacewatch	V	430 m	MPC · JPL
743326	2008 SL_{192}	—	September 25, 2008	Kitt Peak	Spacewatch	·	530 m	MPC · JPL
743327	2008 SY_{204}	—	September 26, 2008	Kitt Peak	Spacewatch	·	2.2 km	MPC · JPL
743328	2008 SJ_{208}	—	September 27, 2008	Mount Lemmon	Mount Lemmon Survey	·	2.0 km	MPC · JPL
743329	2008 SN_{210}	—	September 28, 2008	Mount Lemmon	Mount Lemmon Survey	EMA	2.1 km	MPC · JPL
743330	2008 SQ_{212}	—	September 2, 2008	Kitt Peak	Spacewatch	·	2.0 km	MPC · JPL
743331	2008 SJ_{215}	—	January 23, 2006	Mount Lemmon	Mount Lemmon Survey	·	680 m	MPC · JPL
743332	2008 SM_{222}	—	October 17, 2003	Kitt Peak	Spacewatch	·	2.0 km	MPC · JPL
743333	2008 SV_{231}	—	September 28, 2008	Mount Lemmon	Mount Lemmon Survey	·	1.9 km	MPC · JPL
743334	2008 SW_{239}	—	September 21, 2008	Kitt Peak	Spacewatch	·	2.3 km	MPC · JPL
743335	2008 SG_{242}	—	September 25, 2008	Kitt Peak	Spacewatch	MAS	660 m	MPC · JPL
743336	2008 SO_{244}	—	September 7, 2008	Mount Lemmon	Mount Lemmon Survey	·	2.8 km	MPC · JPL
743337	2008 SU_{252}	—	July 9, 2002	Complejo Astronomi	Gil-Hutton, R., Licandro, J.	·	2.0 km	MPC · JPL
743338	2008 SC_{254}	—	September 22, 2008	Kitt Peak	Spacewatch	·	2.7 km	MPC · JPL
743339	2008 SC_{259}	—	September 23, 2008	Kitt Peak	Spacewatch	·	2.8 km	MPC · JPL
743340	2008 SM_{260}	—	September 23, 2008	Kitt Peak	Spacewatch	·	1.8 km	MPC · JPL
743341	2008 SP_{260}	—	September 23, 2008	Kitt Peak	Spacewatch	(5)	860 m	MPC · JPL
743342	2008 SU_{260}	—	September 23, 2008	Mount Lemmon	Mount Lemmon Survey	·	550 m	MPC · JPL
743343	2008 SY_{260}	—	September 23, 2008	Mount Lemmon	Mount Lemmon Survey	·	2.9 km	MPC · JPL
743344	2008 SW_{262}	—	September 24, 2008	Kitt Peak	Spacewatch	·	2.5 km	MPC · JPL
743345	2008 ST_{267}	—	September 23, 2008	Catalina	CSS	THB	2.7 km	MPC · JPL
743346	2008 SC_{273}	—	September 29, 2008	Mount Lemmon	Mount Lemmon Survey	·	2.4 km	MPC · JPL
743347	2008 SQ_{273}	—	September 29, 2008	Mount Lemmon	Mount Lemmon Survey	THB	2.8 km	MPC · JPL
743348	2008 SJ_{275}	—	September 23, 2008	Kitt Peak	Spacewatch	EOS	1.4 km	MPC · JPL
743349	2008 SK_{276}	—	September 23, 2008	Mount Lemmon	Mount Lemmon Survey	·	2.2 km	MPC · JPL
743350	2008 SS_{276}	—	September 24, 2008	Kitt Peak	Spacewatch	·	2.5 km	MPC · JPL
743351	2008 SX_{281}	—	September 24, 2008	Mount Lemmon	Mount Lemmon Survey	EUN	1.0 km	MPC · JPL
743352	2008 SZ_{281}	—	September 24, 2008	Mount Lemmon	Mount Lemmon Survey	·	2.0 km	MPC · JPL
743353	2008 SA_{284}	—	September 23, 2008	Catalina	CSS	·	1.2 km	MPC · JPL
743354	2008 SB_{286}	—	September 22, 2008	Mount Lemmon	Mount Lemmon Survey	·	2.7 km	MPC · JPL
743355	2008 SB_{290}	—	September 28, 2008	Mount Lemmon	Mount Lemmon Survey	EOS	1.6 km	MPC · JPL
743356	2008 SC_{290}	—	September 28, 2008	Mount Lemmon	Mount Lemmon Survey	·	2.7 km	MPC · JPL
743357	2008 SQ_{296}	—	September 29, 2008	Catalina	CSS	·	1.2 km	MPC · JPL
743358	2008 SG_{312}	—	September 24, 2008	Mount Lemmon	Mount Lemmon Survey	·	2.3 km	MPC · JPL
743359	2008 SW_{312}	—	September 23, 2008	Kitt Peak	Spacewatch	·	2.9 km	MPC · JPL
743360	2008 SZ_{312}	—	September 23, 2008	Kitt Peak	Spacewatch	·	2.2 km	MPC · JPL
743361	2008 SU_{313}	—	September 24, 2008	Mount Lemmon	Mount Lemmon Survey	NYS	690 m	MPC · JPL
743362	2008 SB_{316}	—	September 27, 2008	Mount Lemmon	Mount Lemmon Survey	(5)	940 m	MPC · JPL
743363	2008 SO_{317}	—	September 16, 2012	Kitt Peak	Spacewatch	·	1.1 km	MPC · JPL
743364	2008 SM_{318}	—	September 25, 2008	Kitt Peak	Spacewatch	·	720 m	MPC · JPL
743365	2008 SO_{318}	—	September 23, 2008	Kitt Peak	Spacewatch	·	680 m	MPC · JPL
743366	2008 SB_{319}	—	September 23, 2008	Mount Lemmon	Mount Lemmon Survey	·	1.2 km	MPC · JPL
743367	2008 SH_{319}	—	September 22, 2008	Kitt Peak	Spacewatch	·	530 m	MPC · JPL
743368	2008 SP_{319}	—	September 24, 2008	Mount Lemmon	Mount Lemmon Survey	·	2.2 km	MPC · JPL
743369	2008 SX_{319}	—	September 23, 2008	Mount Lemmon	Mount Lemmon Survey	·	820 m	MPC · JPL
743370	2008 SB_{320}	—	September 25, 2008	Mount Lemmon	Mount Lemmon Survey	·	480 m	MPC · JPL
743371	2008 SG_{320}	—	September 23, 2008	Kitt Peak	Spacewatch	·	480 m	MPC · JPL
743372	2008 SV_{320}	—	September 27, 2008	Mount Lemmon	Mount Lemmon Survey	·	710 m	MPC · JPL
743373	2008 SK_{321}	—	September 25, 2008	Kitt Peak	Spacewatch	·	700 m	MPC · JPL
743374	2008 SQ_{321}	—	September 23, 2008	Mount Lemmon	Mount Lemmon Survey	·	2.7 km	MPC · JPL
743375	2008 ST_{321}	—	March 13, 2011	Kitt Peak	Spacewatch	·	2.0 km	MPC · JPL
743376	2008 SC_{322}	—	September 24, 2008	Kitt Peak	Spacewatch	H	400 m	MPC · JPL
743377	2008 SZ_{323}	—	February 21, 2017	Haleakala	Pan-STARRS 1	·	2.6 km	MPC · JPL
743378	2008 SF_{324}	—	December 10, 2014	Mount Lemmon	Mount Lemmon Survey	EUP	3.2 km	MPC · JPL
743379	2008 SH_{325}	—	May 21, 2018	Haleakala	Pan-STARRS 1	·	1.4 km	MPC · JPL
743380	2008 SN_{326}	—	September 25, 2008	Kitt Peak	Spacewatch	·	590 m	MPC · JPL
743381	2008 SP_{326}	—	January 12, 2010	Kitt Peak	Spacewatch	·	2.0 km	MPC · JPL
743382	2008 SF_{327}	—	May 20, 2018	Haleakala	Pan-STARRS 1	·	2.0 km	MPC · JPL
743383	2008 SA_{328}	—	September 23, 2008	Kitt Peak	Spacewatch	·	1.2 km	MPC · JPL
743384	2008 SV_{328}	—	September 23, 2008	Mount Lemmon	Mount Lemmon Survey	AGN	1.0 km	MPC · JPL
743385	2008 SL_{329}	—	November 29, 2013	Kitt Peak	Spacewatch	·	1.1 km	MPC · JPL
743386	2008 SP_{329}	—	November 18, 2009	Mount Lemmon	Mount Lemmon Survey	·	2.4 km	MPC · JPL
743387	2008 SU_{331}	—	September 29, 2008	Mount Lemmon	Mount Lemmon Survey	·	740 m	MPC · JPL
743388	2008 SG_{332}	—	April 14, 2011	Mount Lemmon	Mount Lemmon Survey	·	920 m	MPC · JPL
743389	2008 SX_{333}	—	March 24, 2015	Mount Lemmon	Mount Lemmon Survey	·	970 m	MPC · JPL
743390	2008 SY_{334}	—	September 29, 2008	Mount Lemmon	Mount Lemmon Survey	·	2.7 km	MPC · JPL
743391	2008 SD_{339}	—	September 24, 2008	Mount Lemmon	Mount Lemmon Survey	·	2.2 km	MPC · JPL
743392	2008 SW_{340}	—	September 29, 2008	Mount Lemmon	Mount Lemmon Survey	·	1.7 km	MPC · JPL
743393	2008 SS_{341}	—	September 22, 2008	Kitt Peak	Spacewatch	·	800 m	MPC · JPL
743394	2008 SK_{343}	—	September 22, 2008	Kitt Peak	Spacewatch	·	460 m	MPC · JPL
743395	2008 SQ_{345}	—	September 25, 2008	Kitt Peak	Spacewatch	·	600 m	MPC · JPL
743396	2008 SD_{349}	—	September 29, 2008	Mount Lemmon	Mount Lemmon Survey	·	1.5 km	MPC · JPL
743397	2008 SA_{350}	—	September 28, 2008	Mount Lemmon	Mount Lemmon Survey	·	1.5 km	MPC · JPL
743398	2008 SB_{354}	—	September 27, 2008	Mount Lemmon	Mount Lemmon Survey	·	490 m	MPC · JPL
743399	2008 TV_{2}	—	October 4, 2008	Pla D'Arguines	R. Ferrando, Ferrando, M.	·	2.6 km	MPC · JPL
743400	2008 TN_{3}	—	October 5, 2008	Wildberg	R. Apitzsch	·	990 m	MPC · JPL

== 743401–743500 ==
back to top

Designation			Discovery			Properties		Ref
Permanent	Provisional	Named after	Date	Site	Discoverer(s)	Category	Diam.	Ref
743401	2008 TF_{11}	—	September 24, 2008	Kitt Peak	Spacewatch	·	560 m	MPC · JPL
743402	2008 TK_{17}	—	October 1, 2008	Mount Lemmon	Mount Lemmon Survey	·	830 m	MPC · JPL
743403	2008 TO_{17}	—	October 1, 2008	Mount Lemmon	Mount Lemmon Survey	·	1.5 km	MPC · JPL
743404	2008 TU_{20}	—	October 1, 2008	Mount Lemmon	Mount Lemmon Survey	·	2.0 km	MPC · JPL
743405	2008 TG_{21}	—	October 1, 2008	Mount Lemmon	Mount Lemmon Survey	·	2.2 km	MPC · JPL
743406	2008 TJ_{22}	—	October 1, 2008	Kitt Peak	Spacewatch	·	520 m	MPC · JPL
743407	2008 TW_{25}	—	September 21, 2008	Kitt Peak	Spacewatch	H	470 m	MPC · JPL
743408	2008 TV_{26}	—	October 9, 2008	Kitt Peak	Spacewatch	V	560 m	MPC · JPL
743409	2008 TO_{28}	—	October 1, 2008	Mount Lemmon	Mount Lemmon Survey	·	1.4 km	MPC · JPL
743410	2008 TV_{30}	—	October 1, 2008	Kitt Peak	Spacewatch	EUN	830 m	MPC · JPL
743411	2008 TS_{33}	—	September 24, 2008	Kitt Peak	Spacewatch	·	1.9 km	MPC · JPL
743412	2008 TE_{35}	—	September 10, 2008	Kitt Peak	Spacewatch	·	2.9 km	MPC · JPL
743413	2008 TL_{36}	—	September 2, 2008	Kitt Peak	Spacewatch	·	2.0 km	MPC · JPL
743414	2008 TP_{39}	—	September 22, 2008	Kitt Peak	Spacewatch	·	720 m	MPC · JPL
743415	2008 TU_{44}	—	October 1, 2008	Mount Lemmon	Mount Lemmon Survey	·	2.0 km	MPC · JPL
743416	2008 TM_{46}	—	October 1, 2008	Kitt Peak	Spacewatch	·	2.6 km	MPC · JPL
743417	2008 TS_{52}	—	September 24, 2008	Kitt Peak	Spacewatch	·	590 m	MPC · JPL
743418	2008 TU_{60}	—	October 10, 2004	Kitt Peak	Spacewatch	·	680 m	MPC · JPL
743419	2008 TB_{65}	—	September 23, 2008	Catalina	CSS	·	2.5 km	MPC · JPL
743420	2008 TZ_{73}	—	October 2, 2008	Kitt Peak	Spacewatch	EOS	1.6 km	MPC · JPL
743421	2008 TT_{75}	—	October 2, 2008	Kitt Peak	Spacewatch	·	1.5 km	MPC · JPL
743422	2008 TN_{76}	—	October 2, 2008	Mount Lemmon	Mount Lemmon Survey	·	2.0 km	MPC · JPL
743423	2008 TO_{77}	—	September 2, 2008	Kitt Peak	Spacewatch	·	1.8 km	MPC · JPL
743424	2008 TR_{78}	—	September 2, 2008	Kitt Peak	Spacewatch	·	1.9 km	MPC · JPL
743425	2008 TS_{78}	—	September 24, 2008	Kitt Peak	Spacewatch	·	1.7 km	MPC · JPL
743426	2008 TO_{86}	—	September 4, 2008	Kitt Peak	Spacewatch	·	910 m	MPC · JPL
743427	2008 TK_{91}	—	September 10, 2008	Kitt Peak	Spacewatch	LIX	2.7 km	MPC · JPL
743428	2008 TC_{93}	—	October 8, 2008	Kitt Peak	Spacewatch	·	1.9 km	MPC · JPL
743429	2008 TL_{93}	—	September 23, 2008	Mount Lemmon	Mount Lemmon Survey	·	2.4 km	MPC · JPL
743430	2008 TF_{96}	—	October 6, 2008	Kitt Peak	Spacewatch	EOS	1.6 km	MPC · JPL
743431	2008 TZ_{97}	—	October 6, 2008	Kitt Peak	Spacewatch	·	740 m	MPC · JPL
743432	2008 TW_{101}	—	September 24, 2008	Kitt Peak	Spacewatch	·	690 m	MPC · JPL
743433	2008 TV_{103}	—	September 22, 2008	Kitt Peak	Spacewatch	KON	1.6 km	MPC · JPL
743434	2008 TE_{106}	—	September 22, 2008	Kitt Peak	Spacewatch	THM	1.8 km	MPC · JPL
743435	2008 TJ_{106}	—	September 22, 2008	Mount Lemmon	Mount Lemmon Survey	3:2	4.2 km	MPC · JPL
743436	2008 TL_{109}	—	September 23, 2008	Mount Lemmon	Mount Lemmon Survey	·	590 m	MPC · JPL
743437	2008 TJ_{110}	—	September 26, 2008	Charleston	R. Holmes	·	1.8 km	MPC · JPL
743438	2008 TF_{122}	—	October 7, 2008	Catalina	CSS	·	2.1 km	MPC · JPL
743439	2008 TS_{126}	—	September 22, 2008	Kitt Peak	Spacewatch	H	470 m	MPC · JPL
743440	2008 TL_{127}	—	September 23, 2008	Kitt Peak	Spacewatch	·	760 m	MPC · JPL
743441	2008 TB_{128}	—	October 8, 2008	Mount Lemmon	Mount Lemmon Survey	·	1.0 km	MPC · JPL
743442	2008 TW_{128}	—	October 8, 2008	Mount Lemmon	Mount Lemmon Survey	·	1.7 km	MPC · JPL
743443	2008 TC_{129}	—	September 23, 2008	Kitt Peak	Spacewatch	·	2.1 km	MPC · JPL
743444	2008 TJ_{129}	—	October 8, 2008	Mount Lemmon	Mount Lemmon Survey	EOS	1.4 km	MPC · JPL
743445	2008 TC_{132}	—	September 23, 2008	Kitt Peak	Spacewatch	·	1.8 km	MPC · JPL
743446	2008 TT_{133}	—	September 23, 2008	Mount Lemmon	Mount Lemmon Survey	·	1.8 km	MPC · JPL
743447	2008 TQ_{138}	—	September 23, 2008	Kitt Peak	Spacewatch	EMA	2.4 km	MPC · JPL
743448	2008 TM_{139}	—	September 23, 2008	Kitt Peak	Spacewatch	·	1.5 km	MPC · JPL
743449	2008 TE_{141}	—	September 23, 2008	Mount Lemmon	Mount Lemmon Survey	H	350 m	MPC · JPL
743450	2008 TD_{147}	—	September 23, 2008	Mount Lemmon	Mount Lemmon Survey	·	1.9 km	MPC · JPL
743451	2008 TY_{147}	—	September 3, 2008	Kitt Peak	Spacewatch	·	1.7 km	MPC · JPL
743452	2008 TM_{155}	—	October 9, 2008	Mount Lemmon	Mount Lemmon Survey	EOS	1.4 km	MPC · JPL
743453	2008 TC_{159}	—	May 11, 2007	Mount Lemmon	Mount Lemmon Survey	·	1.9 km	MPC · JPL
743454	2008 TO_{159}	—	October 9, 2008	Mount Lemmon	Mount Lemmon Survey	·	2.5 km	MPC · JPL
743455	2008 TU_{160}	—	October 2, 2008	Kitt Peak	Spacewatch	·	1.7 km	MPC · JPL
743456	2008 TA_{163}	—	October 1, 2008	Kitt Peak	Spacewatch	EOS	1.6 km	MPC · JPL
743457	2008 TN_{164}	—	October 1, 2008	Kitt Peak	Spacewatch	·	650 m	MPC · JPL
743458	2008 TD_{165}	—	October 2, 2008	Kitt Peak	Spacewatch	·	2.2 km	MPC · JPL
743459	2008 TO_{165}	—	October 2, 2008	Mount Lemmon	Mount Lemmon Survey	·	840 m	MPC · JPL
743460	2008 TK_{168}	—	October 1, 2008	Kitt Peak	Spacewatch	T_{j} (2.99)	2.8 km	MPC · JPL
743461	2008 TZ_{168}	—	May 7, 2006	Mount Lemmon	Mount Lemmon Survey	·	2.8 km	MPC · JPL
743462	2008 TS_{185}	—	October 6, 2008	Mount Lemmon	Mount Lemmon Survey	·	2.5 km	MPC · JPL
743463	2008 TA_{188}	—	October 9, 2008	Kitt Peak	Spacewatch	EOS	1.5 km	MPC · JPL
743464	2008 TX_{191}	—	October 2, 2008	Mount Lemmon	Mount Lemmon Survey	·	2.9 km	MPC · JPL
743465	2008 TG_{193}	—	October 6, 2008	Mount Lemmon	Mount Lemmon Survey	·	620 m	MPC · JPL
743466	2008 TH_{194}	—	February 22, 2014	Catalina	CSS	·	1.3 km	MPC · JPL
743467	2008 TL_{195}	—	October 10, 2008	Mount Lemmon	Mount Lemmon Survey	H	470 m	MPC · JPL
743468	2008 TS_{195}	—	October 10, 2008	Mount Lemmon	Mount Lemmon Survey	·	810 m	MPC · JPL
743469	2008 TW_{195}	—	October 9, 2008	Mount Lemmon	Mount Lemmon Survey	EOS	1.7 km	MPC · JPL
743470	2008 TC_{196}	—	October 3, 2008	Mount Lemmon	Mount Lemmon Survey	·	740 m	MPC · JPL
743471	2008 TF_{196}	—	November 9, 2013	Mount Lemmon	Mount Lemmon Survey	·	1.9 km	MPC · JPL
743472	2008 TR_{196}	—	October 8, 2008	Mount Lemmon	Mount Lemmon Survey	·	1.1 km	MPC · JPL
743473	2008 TC_{197}	—	October 9, 2008	Kitt Peak	Spacewatch	·	1.8 km	MPC · JPL
743474	2008 TX_{197}	—	October 6, 2008	Kitt Peak	Spacewatch	·	730 m	MPC · JPL
743475	2008 TB_{198}	—	August 12, 2012	Mayhill-ISON	L. Elenin	·	1.4 km	MPC · JPL
743476	2008 TG_{200}	—	October 8, 2008	Mount Lemmon	Mount Lemmon Survey	·	2.0 km	MPC · JPL
743477	2008 TQ_{200}	—	October 2, 2008	Kitt Peak	Spacewatch	H	370 m	MPC · JPL
743478	2008 TR_{200}	—	November 21, 2014	Mount Lemmon	Mount Lemmon Survey	·	2.1 km	MPC · JPL
743479	2008 TS_{200}	—	October 1, 2008	Mount Lemmon	Mount Lemmon Survey	·	720 m	MPC · JPL
743480	2008 TV_{201}	—	October 10, 2008	Mount Lemmon	Mount Lemmon Survey	·	660 m	MPC · JPL
743481	2008 TB_{204}	—	October 6, 2008	Mount Lemmon	Mount Lemmon Survey	·	2.1 km	MPC · JPL
743482	2008 TL_{204}	—	October 6, 2008	Kitt Peak	Spacewatch	·	2.3 km	MPC · JPL
743483	2008 TM_{204}	—	October 7, 2008	Kitt Peak	Spacewatch	·	2.0 km	MPC · JPL
743484	2008 TT_{204}	—	October 8, 2008	Kitt Peak	Spacewatch	·	1.7 km	MPC · JPL
743485	2008 TA_{205}	—	June 12, 2015	Mount Lemmon	Mount Lemmon Survey	PHO	810 m	MPC · JPL
743486	2008 TK_{205}	—	October 7, 2008	Mount Lemmon	Mount Lemmon Survey	·	2.2 km	MPC · JPL
743487	2008 TW_{206}	—	October 10, 2012	Mount Lemmon	Mount Lemmon Survey	·	1.1 km	MPC · JPL
743488	2008 TT_{207}	—	October 6, 2008	Mount Lemmon	Mount Lemmon Survey	·	2.7 km	MPC · JPL
743489	2008 TZ_{207}	—	April 18, 2015	Haleakala	Pan-STARRS 1	·	1.4 km	MPC · JPL
743490	2008 TJ_{208}	—	November 27, 2014	Haleakala	Pan-STARRS 1	·	1.8 km	MPC · JPL
743491	2008 TQ_{211}	—	October 10, 2008	Mount Lemmon	Mount Lemmon Survey	·	1.1 km	MPC · JPL
743492	2008 TG_{212}	—	December 27, 2013	Mount Lemmon	Mount Lemmon Survey	·	1.1 km	MPC · JPL
743493	2008 TE_{213}	—	October 6, 2008	Mount Lemmon	Mount Lemmon Survey	·	1.9 km	MPC · JPL
743494	2008 TN_{214}	—	October 1, 2008	Kitt Peak	Spacewatch	T_{j} (2.94)	3.0 km	MPC · JPL
743495	2008 TO_{214}	—	October 3, 2008	Kitt Peak	Spacewatch	EOS	1.5 km	MPC · JPL
743496	2008 TZ_{216}	—	October 10, 2008	Mount Lemmon	Mount Lemmon Survey	·	2.0 km	MPC · JPL
743497	2008 TA_{217}	—	October 10, 2008	Mount Lemmon	Mount Lemmon Survey	EOS	1.5 km	MPC · JPL
743498	2008 TG_{221}	—	October 8, 2008	Mount Lemmon	Mount Lemmon Survey	·	1.5 km	MPC · JPL
743499	2008 TP_{221}	—	September 7, 2008	Mount Lemmon	Mount Lemmon Survey	·	520 m	MPC · JPL
743500	2008 TJ_{222}	—	October 8, 2008	Catalina	CSS	·	850 m	MPC · JPL

== 743501–743600 ==
back to top

Designation			Discovery			Properties		Ref
Permanent	Provisional	Named after	Date	Site	Discoverer(s)	Category	Diam.	Ref
743501	2008 TU_{222}	—	October 6, 2008	Kitt Peak	Spacewatch	·	670 m	MPC · JPL
743502	2008 TG_{224}	—	October 6, 2008	La Sagra	OAM	·	2.8 km	MPC · JPL
743503	2008 TN_{226}	—	October 7, 2008	Mount Lemmon	Mount Lemmon Survey	·	1.8 km	MPC · JPL
743504	2008 TO_{226}	—	October 1, 2008	Mount Lemmon	Mount Lemmon Survey	·	1.6 km	MPC · JPL
743505	2008 UB_{2}	—	September 6, 2008	Catalina	CSS	·	2.9 km	MPC · JPL
743506	2008 UU_{6}	—	October 6, 2008	Kitt Peak	Spacewatch	NYS	900 m	MPC · JPL
743507	2008 UQ_{7}	—	July 31, 2008	Mount Lemmon	Mount Lemmon Survey	·	2.4 km	MPC · JPL
743508	2008 UE_{11}	—	September 2, 2008	Kitt Peak	Spacewatch	·	1.5 km	MPC · JPL
743509	2008 UN_{13}	—	September 2, 2008	Kitt Peak	Spacewatch	THM	1.8 km	MPC · JPL
743510	2008 UJ_{28}	—	October 20, 2008	Kitt Peak	Spacewatch	·	910 m	MPC · JPL
743511	2008 UM_{32}	—	October 6, 2008	Mount Lemmon	Mount Lemmon Survey	·	2.8 km	MPC · JPL
743512	2008 UW_{35}	—	September 20, 2008	Kitt Peak	Spacewatch	·	2.3 km	MPC · JPL
743513	2008 UZ_{41}	—	October 20, 2008	Kitt Peak	Spacewatch	·	2.3 km	MPC · JPL
743514	2008 UG_{43}	—	October 20, 2008	Mount Lemmon	Mount Lemmon Survey	H	480 m	MPC · JPL
743515	2008 UW_{45}	—	September 20, 2008	Kitt Peak	Spacewatch	·	890 m	MPC · JPL
743516	2008 UU_{51}	—	October 20, 2008	Kitt Peak	Spacewatch	·	820 m	MPC · JPL
743517	2008 UF_{53}	—	October 20, 2008	Kitt Peak	Spacewatch	EOS	1.6 km	MPC · JPL
743518	2008 US_{53}	—	October 20, 2008	Kitt Peak	Spacewatch	·	2.1 km	MPC · JPL
743519	2008 UJ_{55}	—	September 24, 2008	Kitt Peak	Spacewatch	KOR	1.0 km	MPC · JPL
743520	2008 UV_{56}	—	September 22, 2008	Mount Lemmon	Mount Lemmon Survey	·	2.3 km	MPC · JPL
743521	2008 UV_{60}	—	October 21, 2008	Kitt Peak	Spacewatch	·	2.1 km	MPC · JPL
743522	2008 UK_{65}	—	October 21, 2008	Kitt Peak	Spacewatch	·	2.9 km	MPC · JPL
743523	2008 UE_{75}	—	September 22, 2008	Mount Lemmon	Mount Lemmon Survey	·	760 m	MPC · JPL
743524	2008 UY_{76}	—	October 21, 2008	Kitt Peak	Spacewatch	·	990 m	MPC · JPL
743525	2008 UN_{82}	—	September 21, 2008	Catalina	CSS	H	480 m	MPC · JPL
743526	2008 UP_{84}	—	October 23, 2008	Kitt Peak	Spacewatch	·	660 m	MPC · JPL
743527	2008 UR_{90}	—	September 23, 2008	Kitt Peak	Spacewatch	·	2.5 km	MPC · JPL
743528	2008 UF_{91}	—	September 25, 2008	Mount Lemmon	Mount Lemmon Survey	EOS	1.6 km	MPC · JPL
743529	2008 UG_{92}	—	October 1, 2008	Catalina	CSS	·	2.5 km	MPC · JPL
743530	2008 UJ_{96}	—	September 21, 2008	Kitt Peak	Spacewatch	·	490 m	MPC · JPL
743531	2008 UZ_{105}	—	September 2, 2008	Kitt Peak	Spacewatch	·	2.0 km	MPC · JPL
743532	2008 UR_{111}	—	October 22, 2008	Kitt Peak	Spacewatch	EOS	1.4 km	MPC · JPL
743533	2008 US_{111}	—	October 22, 2008	Kitt Peak	Spacewatch	·	1.2 km	MPC · JPL
743534	2008 UA_{113}	—	October 1, 2008	Mount Lemmon	Mount Lemmon Survey	·	730 m	MPC · JPL
743535	2008 UF_{118}	—	October 22, 2008	Kitt Peak	Spacewatch	·	2.5 km	MPC · JPL
743536	2008 UU_{119}	—	October 22, 2008	Kitt Peak	Spacewatch	·	1.4 km	MPC · JPL
743537	2008 UA_{126}	—	October 22, 2008	Kitt Peak	Spacewatch	TIR	2.1 km	MPC · JPL
743538	2008 UG_{128}	—	October 22, 2008	Kitt Peak	Spacewatch	TIR	2.4 km	MPC · JPL
743539	2008 UM_{130}	—	October 23, 2008	Kitt Peak	Spacewatch	(159)	2.0 km	MPC · JPL
743540	2008 UK_{133}	—	October 23, 2008	Kitt Peak	Spacewatch	EOS	1.7 km	MPC · JPL
743541	2008 UN_{133}	—	October 23, 2008	Kitt Peak	Spacewatch	·	610 m	MPC · JPL
743542	2008 UF_{140}	—	October 23, 2008	Kitt Peak	Spacewatch	·	820 m	MPC · JPL
743543	2008 UK_{140}	—	October 23, 2008	Kitt Peak	Spacewatch	LIX	3.1 km	MPC · JPL
743544	2008 UY_{140}	—	October 23, 2008	Kitt Peak	Spacewatch	·	1.9 km	MPC · JPL
743545	2008 UE_{142}	—	October 23, 2008	Kitt Peak	Spacewatch	EOS	1.5 km	MPC · JPL
743546	2008 UZ_{143}	—	September 22, 2008	Mount Lemmon	Mount Lemmon Survey	·	1.9 km	MPC · JPL
743547	2008 UV_{144}	—	October 23, 2008	Kitt Peak	Spacewatch	·	1.5 km	MPC · JPL
743548	2008 UZ_{144}	—	October 23, 2008	Kitt Peak	Spacewatch	·	750 m	MPC · JPL
743549	2008 UX_{145}	—	October 23, 2008	Kitt Peak	Spacewatch	·	650 m	MPC · JPL
743550	2008 UA_{153}	—	September 23, 2008	Kitt Peak	Spacewatch	·	2.3 km	MPC · JPL
743551	2008 UL_{158}	—	October 23, 2008	Kitt Peak	Spacewatch	·	3.4 km	MPC · JPL
743552	2008 UY_{159}	—	October 23, 2008	Kitt Peak	Spacewatch	·	2.2 km	MPC · JPL
743553	2008 UW_{166}	—	October 24, 2008	Kitt Peak	Spacewatch	·	1.4 km	MPC · JPL
743554	2008 UZ_{167}	—	October 24, 2008	Kitt Peak	Spacewatch	·	2.7 km	MPC · JPL
743555	2008 UY_{170}	—	October 24, 2008	Kitt Peak	Spacewatch	·	2.3 km	MPC · JPL
743556	2008 UM_{173}	—	October 24, 2008	Kitt Peak	Spacewatch	·	1.6 km	MPC · JPL
743557	2008 US_{174}	—	September 23, 2008	Kitt Peak	Spacewatch	·	890 m	MPC · JPL
743558	2008 UY_{174}	—	October 24, 2008	Kitt Peak	Spacewatch	·	2.4 km	MPC · JPL
743559	2008 UW_{175}	—	October 24, 2008	Mount Lemmon	Mount Lemmon Survey	·	2.4 km	MPC · JPL
743560	2008 UN_{178}	—	September 21, 2008	Kitt Peak	Spacewatch	TIR	2.2 km	MPC · JPL
743561	2008 UV_{189}	—	October 1, 2008	Mount Lemmon	Mount Lemmon Survey	·	1.3 km	MPC · JPL
743562	2008 UH_{194}	—	October 26, 2008	Kitt Peak	Spacewatch	·	2.4 km	MPC · JPL
743563	2008 UP_{197}	—	October 27, 2008	Kitt Peak	Spacewatch	EOS	1.5 km	MPC · JPL
743564	2008 UO_{198}	—	September 25, 2008	Kitt Peak	Spacewatch	·	1.0 km	MPC · JPL
743565	2008 UW_{198}	—	October 27, 2008	Socorro	LINEAR	·	1.9 km	MPC · JPL
743566	2008 UV_{201}	—	September 25, 2008	Mount Lemmon	Mount Lemmon Survey	TIR	2.9 km	MPC · JPL
743567	2008 UN_{211}	—	September 22, 2008	Kitt Peak	Spacewatch	·	1.8 km	MPC · JPL
743568	2008 UE_{213}	—	October 10, 2008	Mount Lemmon	Mount Lemmon Survey	·	2.0 km	MPC · JPL
743569	2008 UR_{213}	—	October 24, 2008	Catalina	CSS	PHO	800 m	MPC · JPL
743570	2008 UD_{218}	—	October 25, 2008	Kitt Peak	Spacewatch	·	2.3 km	MPC · JPL
743571	2008 UJ_{222}	—	October 21, 2008	Kitt Peak	Spacewatch	·	1.4 km	MPC · JPL
743572	2008 UU_{230}	—	September 29, 2003	Kitt Peak	Spacewatch	·	1.8 km	MPC · JPL
743573	2008 UX_{231}	—	September 22, 2008	Kitt Peak	Spacewatch	·	2.7 km	MPC · JPL
743574	2008 UX_{232}	—	October 26, 2008	Mount Lemmon	Mount Lemmon Survey	EOS	1.5 km	MPC · JPL
743575	2008 UK_{234}	—	October 26, 2008	Kitt Peak	Spacewatch	·	1.1 km	MPC · JPL
743576	2008 UM_{234}	—	October 26, 2008	Kitt Peak	Spacewatch	·	2.0 km	MPC · JPL
743577	2008 UW_{237}	—	October 26, 2008	Kitt Peak	Spacewatch	·	2.5 km	MPC · JPL
743578	2008 UZ_{242}	—	October 26, 2008	Kitt Peak	Spacewatch	·	1.4 km	MPC · JPL
743579	2008 UO_{243}	—	October 26, 2008	Kitt Peak	Spacewatch	·	2.4 km	MPC · JPL
743580	2008 UX_{243}	—	October 26, 2008	Kitt Peak	Spacewatch	·	2.3 km	MPC · JPL
743581	2008 UB_{247}	—	October 26, 2008	Kitt Peak	Spacewatch	·	470 m	MPC · JPL
743582	2008 UM_{247}	—	September 7, 2008	Mount Lemmon	Mount Lemmon Survey	(5)	940 m	MPC · JPL
743583	2008 UR_{249}	—	October 8, 2008	Kitt Peak	Spacewatch	·	680 m	MPC · JPL
743584	2008 UE_{250}	—	October 1, 2008	Kitt Peak	Spacewatch	·	490 m	MPC · JPL
743585	2008 UB_{255}	—	September 21, 2008	Catalina	CSS	T_{j} (2.99)	3.5 km	MPC · JPL
743586	2008 UG_{258}	—	October 27, 2008	Kitt Peak	Spacewatch	·	1.3 km	MPC · JPL
743587	2008 US_{261}	—	October 27, 2008	Kitt Peak	Spacewatch	·	960 m	MPC · JPL
743588	2008 UV_{264}	—	October 28, 2008	Kitt Peak	Spacewatch	·	880 m	MPC · JPL
743589	2008 UE_{266}	—	October 28, 2008	Kitt Peak	Spacewatch	·	2.1 km	MPC · JPL
743590	2008 UF_{266}	—	October 9, 2008	Kitt Peak	Spacewatch	·	730 m	MPC · JPL
743591	2008 UL_{266}	—	October 28, 2008	Kitt Peak	Spacewatch	·	2.2 km	MPC · JPL
743592	2008 UN_{267}	—	October 10, 2008	Mount Lemmon	Mount Lemmon Survey	·	1.4 km	MPC · JPL
743593	2008 UO_{268}	—	October 28, 2008	Kitt Peak	Spacewatch	·	2.1 km	MPC · JPL
743594	2008 UY_{272}	—	October 28, 2008	Kitt Peak	Spacewatch	·	550 m	MPC · JPL
743595	2008 UZ_{272}	—	October 20, 2008	Kitt Peak	Spacewatch	·	2.2 km	MPC · JPL
743596	2008 UN_{273}	—	October 28, 2008	Kitt Peak	Spacewatch	EOS	1.5 km	MPC · JPL
743597	2008 UB_{274}	—	October 28, 2008	Kitt Peak	Spacewatch	(43176)	2.1 km	MPC · JPL
743598	2008 UA_{279}	—	September 29, 2008	Kitt Peak	Spacewatch	·	1.9 km	MPC · JPL
743599	2008 UG_{280}	—	September 29, 2008	Kitt Peak	Spacewatch	·	1.2 km	MPC · JPL
743600	2008 UB_{282}	—	October 28, 2008	Kitt Peak	Spacewatch	·	810 m	MPC · JPL

== 743601–743700 ==
back to top

Designation			Discovery			Properties		Ref
Permanent	Provisional	Named after	Date	Site	Discoverer(s)	Category	Diam.	Ref
743601	2008 UD_{282}	—	October 28, 2008	Kitt Peak	Spacewatch	·	740 m	MPC · JPL
743602	2008 UG_{283}	—	October 20, 2008	Kitt Peak	Spacewatch	TIR	2.6 km	MPC · JPL
743603	2008 UR_{283}	—	September 29, 2008	Kitt Peak	Spacewatch	·	470 m	MPC · JPL
743604	2008 UN_{284}	—	October 20, 2008	Kitt Peak	Spacewatch	·	690 m	MPC · JPL
743605	2008 UT_{284}	—	October 28, 2008	Mount Lemmon	Mount Lemmon Survey	EOS	1.4 km	MPC · JPL
743606	2008 UJ_{290}	—	October 28, 2008	Kitt Peak	Spacewatch	·	790 m	MPC · JPL
743607	2008 UO_{295}	—	October 21, 2008	Kitt Peak	Spacewatch	·	640 m	MPC · JPL
743608	2008 UE_{297}	—	October 29, 2008	Mount Lemmon	Mount Lemmon Survey	L4	7.8 km	MPC · JPL
743609	2008 UR_{301}	—	October 29, 2008	Kitt Peak	Spacewatch	·	2.4 km	MPC · JPL
743610	2008 UK_{302}	—	October 29, 2008	Kitt Peak	Spacewatch	·	1.6 km	MPC · JPL
743611	2008 UY_{302}	—	October 21, 2008	Kitt Peak	Spacewatch	·	3.3 km	MPC · JPL
743612	2008 UH_{303}	—	October 29, 2008	Kitt Peak	Spacewatch	·	2.2 km	MPC · JPL
743613	2008 UH_{304}	—	October 29, 2008	Kitt Peak	Spacewatch	·	790 m	MPC · JPL
743614	2008 UV_{307}	—	October 22, 2008	Kitt Peak	Spacewatch	ARM	3.5 km	MPC · JPL
743615	2008 UA_{312}	—	October 30, 2008	Kitt Peak	Spacewatch	·	970 m	MPC · JPL
743616	2008 UN_{313}	—	October 30, 2008	Catalina	CSS	EOS	1.9 km	MPC · JPL
743617	2008 UQ_{313}	—	October 30, 2008	Catalina	CSS	·	1.7 km	MPC · JPL
743618	2008 UP_{315}	—	October 10, 2008	Catalina	CSS	·	1.4 km	MPC · JPL
743619	2008 UZ_{318}	—	October 31, 2008	Mount Lemmon	Mount Lemmon Survey	·	660 m	MPC · JPL
743620	2008 UN_{321}	—	October 8, 2008	Mount Lemmon	Mount Lemmon Survey	·	2.2 km	MPC · JPL
743621	2008 UU_{321}	—	October 22, 2008	Kitt Peak	Spacewatch	·	1.2 km	MPC · JPL
743622	2008 UL_{327}	—	October 22, 2008	Kitt Peak	Spacewatch	TIR	2.1 km	MPC · JPL
743623	2008 UQ_{330}	—	October 23, 2008	Kitt Peak	Spacewatch	·	1.8 km	MPC · JPL
743624	2008 UQ_{333}	—	October 20, 2008	Mount Lemmon	Mount Lemmon Survey	·	2.4 km	MPC · JPL
743625	2008 UL_{335}	—	October 24, 2008	Kitt Peak	Spacewatch	·	2.5 km	MPC · JPL
743626	2008 UH_{336}	—	October 21, 2008	Kitt Peak	Spacewatch	·	680 m	MPC · JPL
743627	2008 UK_{337}	—	October 23, 2008	Kitt Peak	Spacewatch	·	2.1 km	MPC · JPL
743628	2008 UH_{338}	—	October 21, 2008	Mount Lemmon	Mount Lemmon Survey	·	3.4 km	MPC · JPL
743629	2008 UF_{341}	—	October 25, 2008	Catalina	CSS	·	3.3 km	MPC · JPL
743630	2008 UC_{344}	—	October 26, 2008	Kitt Peak	Spacewatch	·	2.7 km	MPC · JPL
743631	2008 UU_{347}	—	October 23, 2008	Kitt Peak	Spacewatch	·	810 m	MPC · JPL
743632	2008 UY_{349}	—	October 29, 2008	Kitt Peak	Spacewatch	·	2.1 km	MPC · JPL
743633	2008 UF_{350}	—	October 31, 2008	Kitt Peak	Spacewatch	EOS	1.6 km	MPC · JPL
743634	2008 UE_{351}	—	October 27, 2008	Kitt Peak	Spacewatch	·	1.8 km	MPC · JPL
743635	2008 UT_{352}	—	October 26, 2008	Kitt Peak	Spacewatch	MAR	800 m	MPC · JPL
743636	2008 UC_{354}	—	October 23, 2008	Mount Lemmon	Mount Lemmon Survey	HYG	2.3 km	MPC · JPL
743637	2008 UP_{356}	—	October 23, 2008	Kitt Peak	Spacewatch	EUN	750 m	MPC · JPL
743638	2008 UM_{363}	—	October 26, 2008	Catalina	CSS	·	920 m	MPC · JPL
743639	2008 UY_{374}	—	October 24, 2008	Kitt Peak	Spacewatch	·	850 m	MPC · JPL
743640	2008 UV_{375}	—	October 21, 2008	Mount Lemmon	Mount Lemmon Survey	·	2.5 km	MPC · JPL
743641	2008 UT_{376}	—	October 25, 2008	Kitt Peak	Spacewatch	·	950 m	MPC · JPL
743642	2008 UV_{377}	—	February 18, 2010	Kitt Peak	Spacewatch	JUN	860 m	MPC · JPL
743643	2008 UY_{377}	—	October 12, 2016	Mount Lemmon	Mount Lemmon Survey	RAF	790 m	MPC · JPL
743644	2008 UF_{380}	—	October 24, 2008	Kitt Peak	Spacewatch	·	770 m	MPC · JPL
743645	2008 UV_{381}	—	October 29, 2008	Kitt Peak	Spacewatch	MAR	690 m	MPC · JPL
743646	2008 UV_{382}	—	October 29, 2008	Kitt Peak	Spacewatch	·	1.0 km	MPC · JPL
743647	2008 UG_{383}	—	September 24, 2012	Mount Lemmon	Mount Lemmon Survey	·	870 m	MPC · JPL
743648	2008 UW_{383}	—	May 21, 2011	Haleakala	Pan-STARRS 1	·	990 m	MPC · JPL
743649	2008 UA_{385}	—	October 24, 2008	Kitt Peak	Spacewatch	·	2.3 km	MPC · JPL
743650	2008 UJ_{385}	—	October 21, 2008	Mount Lemmon	Mount Lemmon Survey	·	820 m	MPC · JPL
743651	2008 UA_{387}	—	September 10, 2013	Haleakala	Pan-STARRS 1	·	2.7 km	MPC · JPL
743652	2008 UR_{387}	—	October 29, 2008	Kitt Peak	Spacewatch	V	600 m	MPC · JPL
743653	2008 UZ_{388}	—	October 27, 2008	Mount Lemmon	Mount Lemmon Survey	·	2.1 km	MPC · JPL
743654	2008 UC_{389}	—	February 1, 2017	Mount Lemmon	Mount Lemmon Survey	·	990 m	MPC · JPL
743655	2008 UH_{389}	—	March 6, 2016	Haleakala	Pan-STARRS 1	·	2.6 km	MPC · JPL
743656	2008 UL_{391}	—	October 29, 2008	Kitt Peak	Spacewatch	·	1.8 km	MPC · JPL
743657	2008 UC_{393}	—	October 24, 2008	Kitt Peak	Spacewatch	·	2.4 km	MPC · JPL
743658	2008 UU_{393}	—	September 14, 2013	Haleakala	Pan-STARRS 1	·	1.6 km	MPC · JPL
743659	2008 UV_{393}	—	January 15, 2015	Haleakala	Pan-STARRS 1	·	1.6 km	MPC · JPL
743660	2008 US_{395}	—	October 31, 2008	Kitt Peak	Spacewatch	VER	2.4 km	MPC · JPL
743661	2008 UU_{395}	—	June 23, 2015	Haleakala	Pan-STARRS 1	·	820 m	MPC · JPL
743662	2008 UM_{396}	—	January 10, 2014	Kitt Peak	Spacewatch	·	1.2 km	MPC · JPL
743663	2008 UX_{397}	—	October 28, 2008	Kitt Peak	Spacewatch	EOS	1.4 km	MPC · JPL
743664	2008 UU_{399}	—	October 22, 2008	Kitt Peak	Spacewatch	·	1.9 km	MPC · JPL
743665	2008 UD_{400}	—	October 24, 2008	Catalina	CSS	·	2.2 km	MPC · JPL
743666	2008 UH_{400}	—	October 28, 2008	Kitt Peak	Spacewatch	·	1.2 km	MPC · JPL
743667	2008 UN_{403}	—	October 30, 2008	Kitt Peak	Spacewatch	EOS	1.6 km	MPC · JPL
743668	2008 UR_{404}	—	October 23, 2008	Kitt Peak	Spacewatch	EOS	1.4 km	MPC · JPL
743669	2008 UX_{407}	—	October 25, 2008	Kitt Peak	Spacewatch	·	800 m	MPC · JPL
743670	2008 UF_{413}	—	October 21, 2008	Kitt Peak	Spacewatch	EOS	1.6 km	MPC · JPL
743671	2008 US_{413}	—	October 20, 2008	Mount Lemmon	Mount Lemmon Survey	·	1.7 km	MPC · JPL
743672	2008 UL_{414}	—	October 26, 2008	Kitt Peak	Spacewatch	·	1.9 km	MPC · JPL
743673	2008 UJ_{422}	—	October 28, 2008	Kitt Peak	Spacewatch	EOS	1.4 km	MPC · JPL
743674	2008 VQ_{5}	—	November 1, 2008	Mount Lemmon	Mount Lemmon Survey	·	1.4 km	MPC · JPL
743675	2008 VE_{7}	—	October 1, 2008	Mount Lemmon	Mount Lemmon Survey	T_{j} (2.96)	3.0 km	MPC · JPL
743676	2008 VS_{12}	—	October 6, 2008	Catalina	CSS	·	840 m	MPC · JPL
743677	2008 VY_{14}	—	November 2, 2008	Kitt Peak	Spacewatch	·	940 m	MPC · JPL
743678	2008 VM_{20}	—	November 1, 2008	Mount Lemmon	Mount Lemmon Survey	·	2.4 km	MPC · JPL
743679	2008 VS_{20}	—	November 1, 2008	Mount Lemmon	Mount Lemmon Survey	·	2.5 km	MPC · JPL
743680	2008 VV_{21}	—	November 1, 2008	Mount Lemmon	Mount Lemmon Survey	·	560 m	MPC · JPL
743681	2008 VV_{24}	—	November 1, 2008	Kitt Peak	Spacewatch	EUN	680 m	MPC · JPL
743682	2008 VZ_{27}	—	September 9, 2008	Mount Lemmon	Mount Lemmon Survey	·	840 m	MPC · JPL
743683	2008 VU_{32}	—	November 2, 2008	Mount Lemmon	Mount Lemmon Survey	·	560 m	MPC · JPL
743684	2008 VA_{34}	—	November 2, 2008	Mount Lemmon	Mount Lemmon Survey	·	1.1 km	MPC · JPL
743685	2008 VJ_{35}	—	November 2, 2008	Mount Lemmon	Mount Lemmon Survey	·	2.6 km	MPC · JPL
743686	2008 VB_{36}	—	October 6, 2008	Mount Lemmon	Mount Lemmon Survey	(5)	790 m	MPC · JPL
743687	2008 VT_{37}	—	November 2, 2008	Mount Lemmon	Mount Lemmon Survey	·	1.8 km	MPC · JPL
743688	2008 VS_{39}	—	October 25, 2008	Kitt Peak	Spacewatch	·	3.8 km	MPC · JPL
743689	2008 VL_{45}	—	November 3, 2008	Mount Lemmon	Mount Lemmon Survey	·	1.9 km	MPC · JPL
743690	2008 VQ_{47}	—	November 3, 2008	Mount Lemmon	Mount Lemmon Survey	·	3.2 km	MPC · JPL
743691	2008 VB_{48}	—	November 3, 2008	Mount Lemmon	Mount Lemmon Survey	·	2.4 km	MPC · JPL
743692	2008 VE_{48}	—	November 3, 2008	Mount Lemmon	Mount Lemmon Survey	·	1.2 km	MPC · JPL
743693	2008 VG_{49}	—	April 8, 2002	Kitt Peak	Spacewatch	·	780 m	MPC · JPL
743694	2008 VU_{49}	—	September 23, 2008	Kitt Peak	Spacewatch	·	470 m	MPC · JPL
743695	2008 VK_{50}	—	September 7, 2008	Mount Lemmon	Mount Lemmon Survey	·	790 m	MPC · JPL
743696	2008 VM_{50}	—	September 24, 2008	Kitt Peak	Spacewatch	·	2.7 km	MPC · JPL
743697	2008 VW_{51}	—	September 28, 2008	Mount Lemmon	Mount Lemmon Survey	·	2.1 km	MPC · JPL
743698	2008 VD_{55}	—	October 24, 2008	Mount Lemmon	Mount Lemmon Survey	·	1.7 km	MPC · JPL
743699	2008 VW_{58}	—	September 9, 2008	Mount Lemmon	Mount Lemmon Survey	·	2.0 km	MPC · JPL
743700	2008 VT_{60}	—	November 8, 2008	Mount Lemmon	Mount Lemmon Survey	EOS	1.3 km	MPC · JPL

== 743701–743800 ==
back to top

Designation			Discovery			Properties		Ref
Permanent	Provisional	Named after	Date	Site	Discoverer(s)	Category	Diam.	Ref
743701	2008 VX_{61}	—	October 6, 2008	Mount Lemmon	Mount Lemmon Survey	·	750 m	MPC · JPL
743702	2008 VC_{63}	—	October 23, 2008	Kitt Peak	Spacewatch	·	470 m	MPC · JPL
743703	2008 VT_{63}	—	November 8, 2008	Mount Lemmon	Mount Lemmon Survey	·	1.7 km	MPC · JPL
743704	2008 VK_{65}	—	October 25, 2008	Kitt Peak	Spacewatch	(5)	830 m	MPC · JPL
743705	2008 VG_{66}	—	November 1, 2008	Kitt Peak	Spacewatch	·	2.2 km	MPC · JPL
743706	2008 VY_{67}	—	November 6, 2008	Mount Lemmon	Mount Lemmon Survey	·	850 m	MPC · JPL
743707	2008 VM_{75}	—	September 21, 2008	Mount Lemmon	Mount Lemmon Survey	·	1.5 km	MPC · JPL
743708	2008 VK_{77}	—	October 26, 2016	Mount Lemmon	Mount Lemmon Survey	·	860 m	MPC · JPL
743709	2008 VR_{79}	—	November 9, 2008	Kitt Peak	Spacewatch	·	2.8 km	MPC · JPL
743710	2008 VZ_{79}	—	November 7, 2008	Mount Lemmon	Mount Lemmon Survey	·	2.2 km	MPC · JPL
743711	2008 VH_{81}	—	January 13, 2015	Haleakala	Pan-STARRS 1	·	2.1 km	MPC · JPL
743712	2008 VN_{82}	—	November 8, 2008	Kitt Peak	Spacewatch	·	970 m	MPC · JPL
743713	2008 VM_{83}	—	November 1, 2008	Mount Lemmon	Mount Lemmon Survey	·	1.1 km	MPC · JPL
743714	2008 VV_{83}	—	November 1, 2008	Kitt Peak	Spacewatch	·	1.7 km	MPC · JPL
743715	2008 VN_{84}	—	October 9, 2013	Nogales	M. Schwartz, P. R. Holvorcem	·	2.9 km	MPC · JPL
743716	2008 VD_{85}	—	November 9, 2008	Mount Lemmon	Mount Lemmon Survey	·	1.5 km	MPC · JPL
743717	2008 VF_{85}	—	February 26, 2014	Haleakala	Pan-STARRS 1	KON	1.7 km	MPC · JPL
743718	2008 VJ_{85}	—	November 6, 2008	Mount Lemmon	Mount Lemmon Survey	·	920 m	MPC · JPL
743719	2008 VP_{85}	—	April 2, 2014	Mount Lemmon	Mount Lemmon Survey	·	1.1 km	MPC · JPL
743720	2008 VA_{86}	—	November 6, 2008	Mount Lemmon	Mount Lemmon Survey	·	1.1 km	MPC · JPL
743721	2008 VD_{86}	—	October 29, 2008	Kitt Peak	Spacewatch	(5)	980 m	MPC · JPL
743722	2008 VR_{86}	—	November 2, 2008	Mount Lemmon	Mount Lemmon Survey	·	1.8 km	MPC · JPL
743723	2008 VB_{87}	—	November 6, 2008	Kitt Peak	Spacewatch	·	690 m	MPC · JPL
743724	2008 VE_{87}	—	November 7, 2008	Mount Lemmon	Mount Lemmon Survey	·	2.0 km	MPC · JPL
743725	2008 VE_{88}	—	November 7, 2008	Mount Lemmon	Mount Lemmon Survey	·	2.4 km	MPC · JPL
743726	2008 VN_{88}	—	September 29, 2008	Mount Lemmon	Mount Lemmon Survey	·	2.6 km	MPC · JPL
743727	2008 VQ_{88}	—	November 8, 2008	Mount Lemmon	Mount Lemmon Survey	·	740 m	MPC · JPL
743728	2008 VE_{89}	—	November 2, 2008	Mount Lemmon	Mount Lemmon Survey	·	3.1 km	MPC · JPL
743729	2008 VN_{89}	—	April 23, 2014	Mount Lemmon	Mount Lemmon Survey	·	1.0 km	MPC · JPL
743730	2008 VR_{89}	—	October 27, 2008	Mount Lemmon	Mount Lemmon Survey	·	2.5 km	MPC · JPL
743731	2008 VY_{89}	—	September 24, 2013	Kitt Peak	Spacewatch	·	2.2 km	MPC · JPL
743732	2008 VM_{90}	—	February 3, 2016	Haleakala	Pan-STARRS 1	·	1.9 km	MPC · JPL
743733	2008 VS_{90}	—	January 17, 2016	Haleakala	Pan-STARRS 1	·	2.4 km	MPC · JPL
743734	2008 VX_{90}	—	September 6, 2013	Mount Lemmon	Mount Lemmon Survey	·	2.7 km	MPC · JPL
743735	2008 VB_{91}	—	November 6, 2008	Mount Lemmon	Mount Lemmon Survey	·	2.6 km	MPC · JPL
743736	2008 VC_{91}	—	September 6, 2013	Mount Lemmon	Mount Lemmon Survey	·	2.2 km	MPC · JPL
743737	2008 VS_{91}	—	September 5, 2013	Kitt Peak	Spacewatch	·	1.3 km	MPC · JPL
743738	2008 VW_{91}	—	November 23, 2014	Haleakala	Pan-STARRS 1	LIX	2.4 km	MPC · JPL
743739	2008 VL_{92}	—	March 17, 2016	Mount Lemmon	Mount Lemmon Survey	EOS	1.6 km	MPC · JPL
743740	2008 VU_{92}	—	October 18, 2012	Haleakala	Pan-STARRS 1	·	880 m	MPC · JPL
743741	2008 VZ_{92}	—	November 29, 2014	Kitt Peak	Spacewatch	EOS	1.5 km	MPC · JPL
743742	2008 VB_{93}	—	June 15, 2018	Haleakala	Pan-STARRS 1	·	2.2 km	MPC · JPL
743743	2008 VM_{93}	—	October 2, 2008	Mount Lemmon	Mount Lemmon Survey	·	2.2 km	MPC · JPL
743744	2008 VR_{94}	—	November 2, 2008	Mount Lemmon	Mount Lemmon Survey	·	1.1 km	MPC · JPL
743745	2008 VP_{95}	—	January 15, 2015	Haleakala	Pan-STARRS 1	·	2.2 km	MPC · JPL
743746	2008 VM_{96}	—	September 10, 2016	Mount Lemmon	Mount Lemmon Survey	·	930 m	MPC · JPL
743747	2008 VV_{96}	—	September 14, 2013	Haleakala	Pan-STARRS 1	·	2.1 km	MPC · JPL
743748	2008 VP_{98}	—	November 7, 2008	Mount Lemmon	Mount Lemmon Survey	THM	2.0 km	MPC · JPL
743749	2008 VZ_{98}	—	September 24, 2008	Kitt Peak	Spacewatch	·	450 m	MPC · JPL
743750	2008 VU_{100}	—	November 1, 2008	Mount Lemmon	Mount Lemmon Survey	·	710 m	MPC · JPL
743751	2008 VX_{100}	—	November 7, 2008	Mount Lemmon	Mount Lemmon Survey	·	2.1 km	MPC · JPL
743752	2008 VZ_{100}	—	November 6, 2008	Mount Lemmon	Mount Lemmon Survey	·	520 m	MPC · JPL
743753	2008 VC_{101}	—	November 8, 2008	Kitt Peak	Spacewatch	·	800 m	MPC · JPL
743754	2008 VO_{102}	—	November 1, 2008	Mount Lemmon	Mount Lemmon Survey	·	970 m	MPC · JPL
743755	2008 VV_{103}	—	November 7, 2008	Mount Lemmon	Mount Lemmon Survey	·	1.8 km	MPC · JPL
743756	2008 VX_{109}	—	November 8, 2008	Kitt Peak	Spacewatch	·	1.1 km	MPC · JPL
743757	2008 WM_{11}	—	October 24, 2008	Kitt Peak	Spacewatch	·	2.3 km	MPC · JPL
743758	2008 WV_{15}	—	October 9, 2008	Kitt Peak	Spacewatch	EOS	1.6 km	MPC · JPL
743759	2008 WX_{16}	—	November 8, 2008	Kitt Peak	Spacewatch	EUN	1.0 km	MPC · JPL
743760	2008 WB_{18}	—	October 2, 2008	Kitt Peak	Spacewatch	·	2.7 km	MPC · JPL
743761	2008 WS_{18}	—	October 1, 2008	Kitt Peak	Spacewatch	·	2.6 km	MPC · JPL
743762	2008 WB_{20}	—	November 17, 2008	Kitt Peak	Spacewatch	·	770 m	MPC · JPL
743763	2008 WG_{21}	—	November 17, 2008	Kitt Peak	Spacewatch	·	1.2 km	MPC · JPL
743764	2008 WV_{26}	—	October 25, 2008	Kitt Peak	Spacewatch	·	2.1 km	MPC · JPL
743765	2008 WV_{29}	—	November 19, 2008	Mount Lemmon	Mount Lemmon Survey	·	3.7 km	MPC · JPL
743766	2008 WR_{33}	—	October 28, 2008	Mount Lemmon	Mount Lemmon Survey	·	780 m	MPC · JPL
743767	2008 WV_{34}	—	October 23, 2008	Kitt Peak	Spacewatch	EOS	1.3 km	MPC · JPL
743768	2008 WK_{37}	—	October 20, 2008	Mount Lemmon	Mount Lemmon Survey	THM	2.0 km	MPC · JPL
743769	2008 WE_{38}	—	October 24, 2008	Kitt Peak	Spacewatch	·	800 m	MPC · JPL
743770	2008 WW_{40}	—	November 1, 2008	Mount Lemmon	Mount Lemmon Survey	EOS	1.4 km	MPC · JPL
743771	2008 WA_{45}	—	November 4, 2008	Kitt Peak	Spacewatch	·	2.9 km	MPC · JPL
743772	2008 WC_{45}	—	November 17, 2008	Kitt Peak	Spacewatch	·	2.3 km	MPC · JPL
743773	2008 WB_{47}	—	November 17, 2008	Kitt Peak	Spacewatch	MAR	890 m	MPC · JPL
743774	2008 WF_{47}	—	October 31, 2008	Kitt Peak	Spacewatch	EOS	1.7 km	MPC · JPL
743775	2008 WO_{47}	—	November 3, 2008	Kitt Peak	Spacewatch	·	590 m	MPC · JPL
743776	2008 WM_{49}	—	November 2, 2008	Mount Lemmon	Mount Lemmon Survey	·	2.0 km	MPC · JPL
743777	2008 WY_{49}	—	September 27, 2008	Mount Lemmon	Mount Lemmon Survey	·	1.1 km	MPC · JPL
743778	2008 WP_{52}	—	October 6, 2008	Kitt Peak	Spacewatch	·	3.0 km	MPC · JPL
743779	2008 WB_{54}	—	November 9, 2008	Mount Lemmon	Mount Lemmon Survey	·	550 m	MPC · JPL
743780	2008 WL_{54}	—	October 24, 2008	Kitt Peak	Spacewatch	MAR	840 m	MPC · JPL
743781	2008 WG_{56}	—	November 20, 2008	Mount Lemmon	Mount Lemmon Survey	·	800 m	MPC · JPL
743782	2008 WM_{62}	—	October 27, 2008	Kitt Peak	Spacewatch	·	810 m	MPC · JPL
743783	2008 WR_{62}	—	November 8, 2008	Mount Lemmon	Mount Lemmon Survey	·	840 m	MPC · JPL
743784	2008 WH_{68}	—	November 18, 2008	Kitt Peak	Spacewatch	·	710 m	MPC · JPL
743785	2008 WC_{74}	—	November 8, 2008	Mount Lemmon	Mount Lemmon Survey	THB	2.8 km	MPC · JPL
743786	2008 WJ_{83}	—	November 7, 2008	Mount Lemmon	Mount Lemmon Survey	·	1.2 km	MPC · JPL
743787	2008 WP_{83}	—	November 20, 2008	Kitt Peak	Spacewatch	·	2.9 km	MPC · JPL
743788	2008 WP_{85}	—	November 20, 2008	Kitt Peak	Spacewatch	·	3.1 km	MPC · JPL
743789	2008 WB_{88}	—	November 21, 2008	Mount Lemmon	Mount Lemmon Survey	·	2.3 km	MPC · JPL
743790	2008 WB_{89}	—	November 21, 2008	Kitt Peak	Spacewatch	·	2.4 km	MPC · JPL
743791	2008 WZ_{91}	—	November 3, 2008	Kitt Peak	Spacewatch	EOS	1.3 km	MPC · JPL
743792	2008 WQ_{93}	—	November 2, 2008	Kitt Peak	Spacewatch	·	3.0 km	MPC · JPL
743793	2008 WC_{95}	—	November 21, 2008	Cerro Burek	I. de la Cueva	THB	2.9 km	MPC · JPL
743794	2008 WL_{96}	—	November 5, 2008	Siding Spring	SSS	BAR	940 m	MPC · JPL
743795	2008 WW_{96}	—	November 7, 2008	Mount Lemmon	Mount Lemmon Survey	·	1.0 km	MPC · JPL
743796	2008 WY_{97}	—	November 19, 2008	Catalina	CSS	·	2.4 km	MPC · JPL
743797	2008 WU_{99}	—	September 23, 2008	Mount Lemmon	Mount Lemmon Survey	·	870 m	MPC · JPL
743798	2008 WE_{104}	—	November 8, 2008	Kitt Peak	Spacewatch	THM	1.5 km	MPC · JPL
743799	2008 WJ_{106}	—	October 30, 2008	Kitt Peak	Spacewatch	·	2.5 km	MPC · JPL
743800	2008 WC_{109}	—	September 29, 2008	Mount Lemmon	Mount Lemmon Survey	·	740 m	MPC · JPL

== 743801–743900 ==
back to top

Designation			Discovery			Properties		Ref
Permanent	Provisional	Named after	Date	Site	Discoverer(s)	Category	Diam.	Ref
743801	2008 WK_{109}	—	October 25, 2008	Kitt Peak	Spacewatch	·	1.4 km	MPC · JPL
743802	2008 WF_{110}	—	September 28, 2008	Mount Lemmon	Mount Lemmon Survey	·	1.6 km	MPC · JPL
743803	2008 WH_{116}	—	November 18, 2008	Kitt Peak	Spacewatch	EOS	1.7 km	MPC · JPL
743804	2008 WN_{117}	—	November 21, 2008	Kitt Peak	Spacewatch	·	780 m	MPC · JPL
743805	2008 WO_{118}	—	November 30, 2008	Mount Lemmon	Mount Lemmon Survey	·	2.3 km	MPC · JPL
743806	2008 WQ_{125}	—	October 31, 2008	Mount Lemmon	Mount Lemmon Survey	·	2.6 km	MPC · JPL
743807	2008 WJ_{129}	—	November 20, 2008	Mount Lemmon	Mount Lemmon Survey	BRG	1.2 km	MPC · JPL
743808	2008 WM_{129}	—	November 22, 2008	Kitt Peak	Spacewatch	·	3.3 km	MPC · JPL
743809	2008 WC_{131}	—	November 19, 2008	Kitt Peak	Spacewatch	·	2.4 km	MPC · JPL
743810	2008 WZ_{135}	—	November 19, 2008	Kitt Peak	Spacewatch	·	2.5 km	MPC · JPL
743811	2008 WK_{145}	—	November 19, 2008	Kitt Peak	Spacewatch	·	700 m	MPC · JPL
743812	2008 WF_{146}	—	November 30, 2008	Kitt Peak	Spacewatch	·	2.9 km	MPC · JPL
743813	2008 WH_{146}	—	November 24, 2008	Mount Lemmon	Mount Lemmon Survey	CLO	1.9 km	MPC · JPL
743814	2008 WJ_{146}	—	October 9, 2013	Mount Lemmon	Mount Lemmon Survey	KOR	1.0 km	MPC · JPL
743815	2008 WU_{146}	—	September 2, 2012	Haleakala	Pan-STARRS 1	·	1.7 km	MPC · JPL
743816	2008 WV_{146}	—	November 1, 2013	Kitt Peak	Spacewatch	H	490 m	MPC · JPL
743817	2008 WB_{147}	—	November 18, 2008	Kitt Peak	Spacewatch	·	990 m	MPC · JPL
743818	2008 WU_{148}	—	November 22, 2008	Kitt Peak	Spacewatch	·	3.6 km	MPC · JPL
743819	2008 WR_{149}	—	November 19, 2008	Kitt Peak	Spacewatch	·	3.2 km	MPC · JPL
743820	2008 WF_{150}	—	November 19, 2008	Kitt Peak	Spacewatch	·	2.7 km	MPC · JPL
743821	2008 WV_{150}	—	October 26, 2013	Mount Lemmon	Mount Lemmon Survey	·	1.6 km	MPC · JPL
743822	2008 WB_{153}	—	November 18, 2008	Kitt Peak	Spacewatch	·	1.1 km	MPC · JPL
743823	2008 WL_{153}	—	March 17, 2015	Mount Lemmon	Mount Lemmon Survey	KOR	1.2 km	MPC · JPL
743824	2008 WD_{155}	—	January 9, 2016	Haleakala	Pan-STARRS 1	·	2.5 km	MPC · JPL
743825	2008 WL_{155}	—	October 20, 2008	Kitt Peak	Spacewatch	·	510 m	MPC · JPL
743826	2008 WA_{156}	—	January 12, 2016	Haleakala	Pan-STARRS 1	URS	2.5 km	MPC · JPL
743827	2008 WN_{156}	—	November 19, 2008	Kitt Peak	Spacewatch	EOS	1.7 km	MPC · JPL
743828	2008 WB_{158}	—	November 20, 2008	Kitt Peak	Spacewatch	·	860 m	MPC · JPL
743829	2008 WF_{158}	—	November 20, 2008	Mount Lemmon	Mount Lemmon Survey	·	2.3 km	MPC · JPL
743830	2008 WA_{159}	—	November 20, 2008	Kitt Peak	Spacewatch	·	700 m	MPC · JPL
743831	2008 XS_{6}	—	December 4, 2008	Socorro	LINEAR	·	1.3 km	MPC · JPL
743832	2008 XH_{13}	—	December 2, 2008	Kitt Peak	Spacewatch	·	2.2 km	MPC · JPL
743833	2008 XN_{17}	—	November 19, 2008	Kitt Peak	Spacewatch	·	760 m	MPC · JPL
743834	2008 XT_{19}	—	December 1, 2008	Kitt Peak	Spacewatch	·	1.3 km	MPC · JPL
743835	2008 XH_{23}	—	December 4, 2008	Mount Lemmon	Mount Lemmon Survey	·	2.0 km	MPC · JPL
743836	2008 XV_{23}	—	October 30, 2008	Kitt Peak	Spacewatch	·	1.5 km	MPC · JPL
743837	2008 XZ_{24}	—	December 4, 2008	Mount Lemmon	Mount Lemmon Survey	·	2.1 km	MPC · JPL
743838	2008 XB_{27}	—	November 9, 2008	Kitt Peak	Spacewatch	·	950 m	MPC · JPL
743839	2008 XA_{28}	—	December 4, 2008	Mount Lemmon	Mount Lemmon Survey	·	860 m	MPC · JPL
743840	2008 XH_{28}	—	October 4, 2008	Mount Lemmon	Mount Lemmon Survey	(5)	870 m	MPC · JPL
743841	2008 XX_{28}	—	December 4, 2008	Mount Lemmon	Mount Lemmon Survey	·	3.5 km	MPC · JPL
743842	2008 XG_{29}	—	December 5, 2008	Mount Lemmon	Mount Lemmon Survey	·	2.8 km	MPC · JPL
743843	2008 XH_{33}	—	December 2, 2008	Kitt Peak	Spacewatch	·	760 m	MPC · JPL
743844	2008 XS_{35}	—	November 19, 2008	Kitt Peak	Spacewatch	·	2.7 km	MPC · JPL
743845	2008 XH_{36}	—	November 19, 2008	Kitt Peak	Spacewatch	NYS	760 m	MPC · JPL
743846	2008 XO_{39}	—	December 2, 2008	Kitt Peak	Spacewatch	·	1.2 km	MPC · JPL
743847	2008 XF_{46}	—	November 7, 2008	Mount Lemmon	Mount Lemmon Survey	·	1.3 km	MPC · JPL
743848	2008 XU_{48}	—	December 4, 2008	Mount Lemmon	Mount Lemmon Survey	·	3.3 km	MPC · JPL
743849	2008 XV_{54}	—	December 4, 2008	Catalina	CSS	·	1.2 km	MPC · JPL
743850	2008 XE_{55}	—	December 1, 2008	Socorro	LINEAR	·	940 m	MPC · JPL
743851	2008 XF_{58}	—	October 10, 2012	Haleakala	Pan-STARRS 1	MAR	1.3 km	MPC · JPL
743852	2008 XN_{58}	—	December 3, 2008	Kitt Peak	Spacewatch	·	930 m	MPC · JPL
743853	2008 XU_{58}	—	December 2, 2008	Kitt Peak	Spacewatch	(5)	720 m	MPC · JPL
743854	2008 XV_{58}	—	November 28, 2013	Mount Lemmon	Mount Lemmon Survey	·	2.2 km	MPC · JPL
743855	2008 XC_{59}	—	November 17, 2014	Haleakala	Pan-STARRS 1	·	3.0 km	MPC · JPL
743856	2008 XM_{59}	—	January 18, 2016	Haleakala	Pan-STARRS 1	VER	2.7 km	MPC · JPL
743857	2008 XE_{60}	—	December 28, 2003	Kitt Peak	Spacewatch	·	1.6 km	MPC · JPL
743858	2008 XQ_{60}	—	December 1, 2008	Kitt Peak	Spacewatch	(5)	910 m	MPC · JPL
743859	2008 XZ_{60}	—	December 2, 2008	Mount Lemmon	Mount Lemmon Survey	·	1.1 km	MPC · JPL
743860	2008 XA_{61}	—	December 6, 2008	Mount Lemmon	Mount Lemmon Survey	·	1.2 km	MPC · JPL
743861	2008 XK_{61}	—	December 1, 2008	Mount Lemmon	Mount Lemmon Survey	·	2.3 km	MPC · JPL
743862	2008 XR_{61}	—	November 24, 2008	Kitt Peak	Spacewatch	EOS	1.6 km	MPC · JPL
743863	2008 XT_{61}	—	December 1, 2008	Kitt Peak	Spacewatch	·	2.6 km	MPC · JPL
743864	2008 XK_{62}	—	June 16, 2018	Haleakala	Pan-STARRS 1	VER	2.0 km	MPC · JPL
743865	2008 XM_{62}	—	April 2, 2016	Mount Lemmon	Mount Lemmon Survey	·	2.2 km	MPC · JPL
743866	2008 XQ_{62}	—	December 6, 2002	Socorro	LINEAR	·	2.5 km	MPC · JPL
743867	2008 XG_{63}	—	December 4, 2008	Catalina	CSS	·	1.2 km	MPC · JPL
743868	2008 XS_{64}	—	December 2, 2008	Mount Lemmon	Mount Lemmon Survey	H	460 m	MPC · JPL
743869	2008 XE_{65}	—	January 22, 2015	Haleakala	Pan-STARRS 1	·	1.6 km	MPC · JPL
743870	2008 XF_{65}	—	April 26, 2017	Haleakala	Pan-STARRS 1	VER	2.0 km	MPC · JPL
743871	2008 XD_{67}	—	December 1, 2008	Mount Lemmon	Mount Lemmon Survey	·	1.2 km	MPC · JPL
743872	2008 XO_{67}	—	December 1, 2008	Mount Lemmon	Mount Lemmon Survey	·	1.8 km	MPC · JPL
743873	2008 XP_{68}	—	December 2, 2008	Kitt Peak	Spacewatch	EOS	1.4 km	MPC · JPL
743874	2008 YO_{1}	—	October 25, 2008	Kitt Peak	Spacewatch	·	2.6 km	MPC · JPL
743875	2008 YF_{2}	—	December 22, 2008	Calar Alto	F. Hormuth	T_{j} (2.9)	3.0 km	MPC · JPL
743876	2008 YN_{4}	—	December 6, 2008	Kitt Peak	Spacewatch	·	3.1 km	MPC · JPL
743877	2008 YK_{6}	—	December 3, 2008	Mount Lemmon	Mount Lemmon Survey	·	2.6 km	MPC · JPL
743878 Shandaren	2008 YE_{8}	Shandaren	December 23, 2008	Weihai	University, Shandong	·	1.1 km	MPC · JPL
743879	2008 YX_{8}	—	December 23, 2008	Piszkéstető	K. Sárneczky	·	1.0 km	MPC · JPL
743880	2008 YP_{9}	—	December 21, 2008	Kitt Peak	Spacewatch	H	540 m	MPC · JPL
743881	2008 YL_{12}	—	December 21, 2008	Mount Lemmon	Mount Lemmon Survey	·	2.6 km	MPC · JPL
743882	2008 YN_{12}	—	November 30, 2008	Kitt Peak	Spacewatch	EOS	1.7 km	MPC · JPL
743883	2008 YA_{13}	—	November 24, 2008	Mount Lemmon	Mount Lemmon Survey	·	1.3 km	MPC · JPL
743884	2008 YY_{13}	—	September 3, 2002	Palomar	NEAT	·	2.0 km	MPC · JPL
743885	2008 YD_{17}	—	December 21, 2008	Mount Lemmon	Mount Lemmon Survey	·	1.8 km	MPC · JPL
743886	2008 YY_{18}	—	October 24, 2008	Mount Lemmon	Mount Lemmon Survey	NYS	970 m	MPC · JPL
743887	2008 YS_{19}	—	November 24, 2008	Mount Lemmon	Mount Lemmon Survey	·	1.0 km	MPC · JPL
743888	2008 YU_{19}	—	December 21, 2008	Mount Lemmon	Mount Lemmon Survey	·	1.1 km	MPC · JPL
743889	2008 YY_{19}	—	December 21, 2008	Mount Lemmon	Mount Lemmon Survey	·	840 m	MPC · JPL
743890	2008 YC_{25}	—	November 30, 2008	Kitt Peak	Spacewatch	·	1.2 km	MPC · JPL
743891	2008 YT_{25}	—	December 27, 2008	Piszkéstető	K. Sárneczky	·	840 m	MPC · JPL
743892	2008 YU_{25}	—	December 27, 2008	Piszkéstető	K. Sárneczky	·	2.0 km	MPC · JPL
743893	2008 YA_{31}	—	December 25, 2008	Bergisch Gladbach	W. Bickel	·	1.2 km	MPC · JPL
743894	2008 YB_{32}	—	December 21, 2008	La Sagra	OAM	T_{j} (2.95) · 3:2	4.7 km	MPC · JPL
743895	2008 YQ_{37}	—	December 22, 2008	Kitt Peak	Spacewatch	·	1.2 km	MPC · JPL
743896	2008 YH_{43}	—	December 21, 2008	Mount Lemmon	Mount Lemmon Survey	·	2.5 km	MPC · JPL
743897	2008 YQ_{43}	—	November 30, 2008	Mount Lemmon	Mount Lemmon Survey	·	2.1 km	MPC · JPL
743898	2008 YD_{44}	—	December 21, 2008	Kitt Peak	Spacewatch	·	2.1 km	MPC · JPL
743899	2008 YN_{60}	—	December 1, 2008	Mount Lemmon	Mount Lemmon Survey	·	3.2 km	MPC · JPL
743900	2008 YP_{67}	—	December 30, 2008	Mount Lemmon	Mount Lemmon Survey	·	2.7 km	MPC · JPL

== 743901–744000 ==
back to top

Designation			Discovery			Properties		Ref
Permanent	Provisional	Named after	Date	Site	Discoverer(s)	Category	Diam.	Ref
743901	2008 YT_{68}	—	December 21, 2008	Catalina	CSS	H	460 m	MPC · JPL
743902	2008 YR_{72}	—	December 30, 2008	Kitt Peak	Spacewatch	·	1.2 km	MPC · JPL
743903	2008 YT_{73}	—	December 22, 2008	Kitt Peak	Spacewatch	·	2.4 km	MPC · JPL
743904	2008 YR_{75}	—	December 30, 2008	Mount Lemmon	Mount Lemmon Survey	·	2.1 km	MPC · JPL
743905	2008 YM_{87}	—	December 21, 2008	Kitt Peak	Spacewatch	(1118)	2.7 km	MPC · JPL
743906	2008 YJ_{95}	—	November 2, 2008	Mount Lemmon	Mount Lemmon Survey	·	1.1 km	MPC · JPL
743907	2008 YG_{97}	—	December 29, 2008	Mount Lemmon	Mount Lemmon Survey	·	1.3 km	MPC · JPL
743908	2008 YG_{98}	—	December 22, 2008	Kitt Peak	Spacewatch	·	2.7 km	MPC · JPL
743909	2008 YQ_{105}	—	December 29, 2008	Kitt Peak	Spacewatch	HYG	2.4 km	MPC · JPL
743910	2008 YX_{106}	—	December 29, 2008	Kitt Peak	Spacewatch	·	1.1 km	MPC · JPL
743911	2008 YF_{108}	—	December 29, 2008	Kitt Peak	Spacewatch	(5)	1 km	MPC · JPL
743912	2008 YH_{112}	—	November 7, 2008	Mount Lemmon	Mount Lemmon Survey	·	710 m	MPC · JPL
743913	2008 YS_{119}	—	December 30, 2008	Kitt Peak	Spacewatch	NYS	1.2 km	MPC · JPL
743914	2008 YO_{121}	—	December 30, 2008	Mount Lemmon	Mount Lemmon Survey	·	2.2 km	MPC · JPL
743915	2008 YU_{121}	—	December 22, 2008	Mount Lemmon	Mount Lemmon Survey	·	2.3 km	MPC · JPL
743916	2008 YG_{127}	—	December 30, 2008	Kitt Peak	Spacewatch	·	860 m	MPC · JPL
743917	2008 YQ_{127}	—	December 21, 2008	Mount Lemmon	Mount Lemmon Survey	·	950 m	MPC · JPL
743918	2008 YD_{129}	—	December 31, 2008	Kitt Peak	Spacewatch	·	1.2 km	MPC · JPL
743919	2008 YB_{130}	—	December 4, 2008	Mount Lemmon	Mount Lemmon Survey	·	940 m	MPC · JPL
743920	2008 YN_{131}	—	December 31, 2008	Kitt Peak	Spacewatch	·	1.1 km	MPC · JPL
743921	2008 YY_{132}	—	December 31, 2008	Kitt Peak	Spacewatch	·	2.1 km	MPC · JPL
743922	2008 YQ_{134}	—	September 7, 2008	Mount Lemmon	Mount Lemmon Survey	·	2.0 km	MPC · JPL
743923	2008 YT_{135}	—	December 30, 2008	Kitt Peak	Spacewatch	EOS	1.8 km	MPC · JPL
743924	2008 YO_{137}	—	September 10, 2007	Mount Lemmon	Mount Lemmon Survey	·	1.6 km	MPC · JPL
743925	2008 YP_{139}	—	December 22, 2008	Kitt Peak	Spacewatch	·	1.1 km	MPC · JPL
743926	2008 YB_{141}	—	December 30, 2008	Mount Lemmon	Mount Lemmon Survey	LIX	2.4 km	MPC · JPL
743927	2008 YU_{141}	—	December 30, 2008	Kitt Peak	Spacewatch	·	2.9 km	MPC · JPL
743928	2008 YA_{144}	—	December 30, 2008	Kitt Peak	Spacewatch	·	1.5 km	MPC · JPL
743929	2008 YS_{145}	—	December 21, 2008	Kitt Peak	Spacewatch	H	420 m	MPC · JPL
743930	2008 YF_{150}	—	December 21, 2008	Kitt Peak	Spacewatch	·	1.0 km	MPC · JPL
743931	2008 YE_{151}	—	December 22, 2008	Kitt Peak	Spacewatch	·	1.2 km	MPC · JPL
743932	2008 YH_{154}	—	December 22, 2008	Mount Lemmon	Mount Lemmon Survey	·	1.2 km	MPC · JPL
743933	2008 YO_{158}	—	January 2, 2009	Catalina	CSS	·	1.4 km	MPC · JPL
743934	2008 YF_{170}	—	October 1, 2008	Kitt Peak	Spacewatch	·	2.9 km	MPC · JPL
743935	2008 YT_{175}	—	December 21, 2008	Mount Lemmon	Mount Lemmon Survey	·	810 m	MPC · JPL
743936	2008 YJ_{177}	—	May 13, 2015	Mount Lemmon	Mount Lemmon Survey	·	1.1 km	MPC · JPL
743937	2008 YL_{177}	—	July 24, 2015	Haleakala	Pan-STARRS 1	HNS	1.0 km	MPC · JPL
743938	2008 YV_{177}	—	December 22, 2008	Kitt Peak	Spacewatch	·	2.9 km	MPC · JPL
743939	2008 YL_{178}	—	December 21, 2008	Mount Lemmon	Mount Lemmon Survey	·	1.3 km	MPC · JPL
743940	2008 YO_{178}	—	December 30, 2008	Kitt Peak	Spacewatch	VER	2.3 km	MPC · JPL
743941	2008 YP_{178}	—	December 31, 2008	Mount Lemmon	Mount Lemmon Survey	·	2.7 km	MPC · JPL
743942	2008 YU_{178}	—	December 3, 2012	Mount Lemmon	Mount Lemmon Survey	·	920 m	MPC · JPL
743943	2008 YY_{178}	—	August 24, 2012	Kitt Peak	Spacewatch	·	1.8 km	MPC · JPL
743944	2008 YE_{179}	—	November 7, 2012	Haleakala	Pan-STARRS 1	(5)	810 m	MPC · JPL
743945	2008 YK_{179}	—	December 30, 2008	Mount Lemmon	Mount Lemmon Survey	·	1.6 km	MPC · JPL
743946	2008 YS_{180}	—	December 12, 2012	Mount Lemmon	Mount Lemmon Survey	·	960 m	MPC · JPL
743947	2008 YZ_{181}	—	October 4, 1996	Kitt Peak	Spacewatch	·	2.3 km	MPC · JPL
743948	2008 YS_{182}	—	October 14, 2013	Mount Lemmon	Mount Lemmon Survey	·	1.4 km	MPC · JPL
743949	2008 YK_{183}	—	October 25, 2008	Kitt Peak	Spacewatch	·	2.5 km	MPC · JPL
743950	2008 YE_{186}	—	December 21, 2008	Kitt Peak	Spacewatch	·	2.4 km	MPC · JPL
743951	2008 YF_{187}	—	December 30, 2008	Kitt Peak	Spacewatch	H	420 m	MPC · JPL
743952	2008 YJ_{187}	—	December 22, 2008	Kitt Peak	Spacewatch	(5)	980 m	MPC · JPL
743953	2008 YH_{188}	—	December 22, 2008	Mount Lemmon	Mount Lemmon Survey	·	2.4 km	MPC · JPL
743954	2008 YQ_{188}	—	December 22, 2008	Mount Lemmon	Mount Lemmon Survey	·	2.2 km	MPC · JPL
743955	2008 YY_{188}	—	December 29, 2008	Kitt Peak	Spacewatch	·	2.2 km	MPC · JPL
743956	2008 YN_{189}	—	December 22, 2008	Mount Lemmon	Mount Lemmon Survey	·	1.6 km	MPC · JPL
743957	2008 YX_{189}	—	December 31, 2008	Kitt Peak	Spacewatch	·	2.4 km	MPC · JPL
743958	2008 YF_{190}	—	December 31, 2008	Catalina	CSS	EUN	990 m	MPC · JPL
743959	2008 YX_{190}	—	December 22, 2008	Kitt Peak	Spacewatch	(5)	1.0 km	MPC · JPL
743960	2008 YM_{191}	—	December 31, 2008	Kitt Peak	Spacewatch	·	980 m	MPC · JPL
743961	2008 YN_{191}	—	December 21, 2008	Mount Lemmon	Mount Lemmon Survey	·	930 m	MPC · JPL
743962	2008 YQ_{191}	—	December 21, 2008	Mount Lemmon	Mount Lemmon Survey	·	850 m	MPC · JPL
743963	2008 YC_{192}	—	December 21, 2008	Mount Lemmon	Mount Lemmon Survey	·	2.4 km	MPC · JPL
743964	2008 YX_{193}	—	December 22, 2008	Mount Lemmon	Mount Lemmon Survey	·	1.4 km	MPC · JPL
743965	2008 YZ_{194}	—	December 30, 2008	Kitt Peak	Spacewatch	·	2.4 km	MPC · JPL
743966	2008 YL_{195}	—	December 22, 2008	Mount Lemmon	Mount Lemmon Survey	HNS	830 m	MPC · JPL
743967	2009 AR_{4}	—	January 1, 2009	Kitt Peak	Spacewatch	·	1.6 km	MPC · JPL
743968	2009 AU_{4}	—	January 1, 2009	Kitt Peak	Spacewatch	(5)	910 m	MPC · JPL
743969	2009 AG_{7}	—	November 2, 2008	Mount Lemmon	Mount Lemmon Survey	EOS	1.8 km	MPC · JPL
743970	2009 AX_{7}	—	January 1, 2009	Mount Lemmon	Mount Lemmon Survey	·	1.5 km	MPC · JPL
743971	2009 AN_{8}	—	November 2, 2008	Mount Lemmon	Mount Lemmon Survey	·	2.1 km	MPC · JPL
743972	2009 AH_{11}	—	January 2, 2009	Mount Lemmon	Mount Lemmon Survey	·	1.5 km	MPC · JPL
743973	2009 AU_{17}	—	December 22, 2008	Kitt Peak	Spacewatch	·	1.6 km	MPC · JPL
743974	2009 AE_{19}	—	January 2, 2009	Mount Lemmon	Mount Lemmon Survey	·	1.1 km	MPC · JPL
743975	2009 AQ_{25}	—	December 22, 2008	Mount Lemmon	Mount Lemmon Survey	(5)	820 m	MPC · JPL
743976	2009 AM_{30}	—	January 15, 2009	Kitt Peak	Spacewatch	V	470 m	MPC · JPL
743977	2009 AR_{36}	—	November 8, 2008	Mount Lemmon	Mount Lemmon Survey	EOS	1.7 km	MPC · JPL
743978	2009 AT_{36}	—	November 8, 2008	Mount Lemmon	Mount Lemmon Survey	·	1.2 km	MPC · JPL
743979	2009 AG_{43}	—	November 24, 2008	Mount Lemmon	Mount Lemmon Survey	VER	2.5 km	MPC · JPL
743980	2009 AT_{48}	—	January 3, 2009	Kitt Peak	Spacewatch	·	730 m	MPC · JPL
743981	2009 AZ_{49}	—	January 2, 2009	Mount Lemmon	Mount Lemmon Survey	HYG	2.5 km	MPC · JPL
743982	2009 AY_{53}	—	October 7, 2012	Haleakala	Pan-STARRS 1	·	1.8 km	MPC · JPL
743983	2009 AM_{54}	—	June 13, 2015	Haleakala	Pan-STARRS 1	·	1.1 km	MPC · JPL
743984	2009 AP_{55}	—	January 23, 2015	Haleakala	Pan-STARRS 1	·	2.3 km	MPC · JPL
743985	2009 AU_{55}	—	January 13, 2015	Haleakala	Pan-STARRS 1	·	2.5 km	MPC · JPL
743986	2009 AX_{55}	—	August 16, 2017	Haleakala	Pan-STARRS 1	·	2.9 km	MPC · JPL
743987	2009 AY_{55}	—	September 8, 2015	Haleakala	Pan-STARRS 1	·	1.1 km	MPC · JPL
743988	2009 AA_{56}	—	January 1, 2009	Kitt Peak	Spacewatch	·	1.2 km	MPC · JPL
743989	2009 AA_{57}	—	January 1, 2009	Kitt Peak	Spacewatch	·	2.7 km	MPC · JPL
743990	2009 AM_{57}	—	August 21, 2015	Haleakala	Pan-STARRS 1	·	920 m	MPC · JPL
743991	2009 AM_{58}	—	November 2, 2013	Catalina	CSS	·	3.2 km	MPC · JPL
743992	2009 AU_{59}	—	January 2, 2009	Kitt Peak	Spacewatch	EOS	1.6 km	MPC · JPL
743993	2009 AB_{62}	—	January 3, 2009	Mount Lemmon	Mount Lemmon Survey	·	1.0 km	MPC · JPL
743994	2009 AP_{63}	—	January 3, 2009	Kitt Peak	Spacewatch	·	1.6 km	MPC · JPL
743995	2009 BB	—	January 16, 2009	Socorro	LINEAR	T_{j} (2.84) · APO +1km	810 m	MPC · JPL
743996	2009 BY	—	January 2, 2009	Mount Lemmon	Mount Lemmon Survey	·	2.5 km	MPC · JPL
743997	2009 BJ_{3}	—	November 8, 2008	Mount Lemmon	Mount Lemmon Survey	·	1.5 km	MPC · JPL
743998	2009 BG_{5}	—	December 21, 2008	Mount Lemmon	Mount Lemmon Survey	·	770 m	MPC · JPL
743999	2009 BQ_{11}	—	January 20, 2009	Socorro	LINEAR	JUN	840 m	MPC · JPL
744000	2009 BX_{13}	—	January 24, 2009	Cerro Burek	I. de la Cueva	·	1.5 km	MPC · JPL

back to top

== Meaning of names ==
As minor planet discoveries are confirmed, they are given a permanent number by the IAU's Minor Planet Center (MPC), and the discoverers can then submit names for them, following the IAU's naming conventions. The list below concerns those minor planets in the specified number-range that have received names, and explains the meanings of those names.

Official naming citations of newly named small Solar System bodies are approved and published in a bulletin by IAU's Working Group for Small Bodies Nomenclature (WGSBN). Before May 2021, citations were published in MPC's Minor Planet Circulars for many decades. Recent citations can also be found on the JPL Small-Body Database (SBDB). Until his death in 2016, German astronomer Lutz D. Schmadel compiled these citations into the Dictionary of Minor Planet Names (DMP) and regularly updated the collection.

Based on Paul Herget's The Names of the Minor Planets, Schmadel also researched the unclear origin of numerous asteroids, most of which had been named prior to World War II. This article incorporates text from this source, which is in the public domain: SBDB New namings may only be added to this list below after official publication as the preannouncement of names is condemned. The WGSBN publishes a comprehensive guideline for the naming rules of non-cometary small Solar System bodies.

Named minor planet	Provisional	This minor planet was named for...	Ref · Catalog
743878 Shandaren	2008 YE_{8}	Shandaren is the Chinese pronunciation of “alumni, students and staffs of Shandong University” (SDU).	IAU · 743878
743062 Dianabeșliu	2008 EJ_{145}	Diana Beșliu-Ionescu (born 1976), researcher of the Astronomical Institute of the Romanian Academy, working on solar physics and space weather.	IAU · 743062
