= List of minor planets: 877001–878000 =

The following is a partial list of minor planets, running from minor-planet number 877001 through 878000, inclusive. The primary data for this and other partial lists is based on JPL's "Small-Body Orbital Elements" and data available from the Minor Planet Center. Critical list information is also provided by the MPC, unless otherwise specified from Lowell Observatory. A detailed description of the table's columns and additional sources are given on the main page including a complete list of every page in this series, and a statistical break-up on the dynamical classification of minor planets.

Also see the summary list of all named bodies in numerical and alphabetical order, and the corresponding naming citations for the number range of this particular list. New namings may only be added to this list after official publication, as the preannouncement of names is condemned by the Working Group for Small Bodies Nomenclature of the International Astronomical Union.

Near-Earth obj.	MBA (inner)	MBA (outer)	Centaur
Mars-crosser	MBA (middle)	Jupiter trojan	Trans-Neptunian obj.
Unclassified

== 877001–877100 ==
Designation			Discovery			Properties		Ref
Permanent	Provisional	Named after	Date	Site	Discoverer(s)	Category	Diam.	Ref
877001	2009 RO_{62}	—	September 15, 2009	Kitt Peak	Spacewatch	·	1.3 km	MPC · JPL
877002	2009 RV_{65}	—	September 15, 2009	Kitt Peak	Spacewatch	·	980 m	MPC · JPL
877003	2009 RX_{65}	—	September 15, 2009	Kitt Peak	Spacewatch	·	910 m	MPC · JPL
877004	2009 RP_{72}	—	September 15, 2009	Kitt Peak	Spacewatch	·	520 m	MPC · JPL
877005	2009 RY_{76}	—	September 15, 2009	Kitt Peak	Spacewatch	·	570 m	MPC · JPL
877006	2009 RQ_{78}	—	September 15, 2009	Kitt Peak	Spacewatch	EOS	1.3 km	MPC · JPL
877007	2009 SQ_{1}	—	August 16, 2009	Kitt Peak	Spacewatch	critical	460 m	MPC · JPL
877008	2009 SW_{16}	—	September 22, 2004	Goodricke-Pigott	R. A. Tucker	·	1.4 km	MPC · JPL
877009	2009 SE_{30}	—	September 16, 2009	Kitt Peak	Spacewatch	·	1.2 km	MPC · JPL
877010	2009 SM_{80}	—	September 18, 2009	Mount Lemmon	Mount Lemmon Survey	·	1.2 km	MPC · JPL
877011	2009 SD_{87}	—	August 27, 2009	Kitt Peak	Spacewatch	·	440 m	MPC · JPL
877012	2009 SK_{92}	—	September 18, 2009	Mount Lemmon	Mount Lemmon Survey	critical	1.3 km	MPC · JPL
877013	2009 SP_{97}	—	September 20, 2009	Mount Lemmon	Mount Lemmon Survey	H	320 m	MPC · JPL
877014	2009 SE_{98}	—	September 20, 2009	Mount Lemmon	Mount Lemmon Survey	·	800 m	MPC · JPL
877015	2009 SO_{100}	—	August 22, 2009	La Sagra	OAM	·	2.4 km	MPC · JPL
877016	2009 SA_{113}	—	September 18, 2009	Kitt Peak	Spacewatch	·	1.4 km	MPC · JPL
877017	2009 SD_{121}	—	September 18, 2009	Kitt Peak	Spacewatch	·	1.3 km	MPC · JPL
877018	2009 SJ_{126}	—	September 18, 2009	Kitt Peak	Spacewatch	·	480 m	MPC · JPL
877019	2009 SH_{148}	—	September 19, 2009	Mount Lemmon	Mount Lemmon Survey	·	1.4 km	MPC · JPL
877020	2009 SA_{158}	—	September 20, 2009	Mount Lemmon	Mount Lemmon Survey	·	580 m	MPC · JPL
877021	2009 SE_{173}	—	September 18, 2009	Kitt Peak	Spacewatch	·	1.6 km	MPC · JPL
877022	2009 SO_{182}	—	August 27, 2009	Kitt Peak	Spacewatch	·	900 m	MPC · JPL
877023	2009 SD_{187}	—	September 21, 2009	Kitt Peak	Spacewatch	·	1.0 km	MPC · JPL
877024	2009 SN_{188}	—	September 21, 2009	Kitt Peak	Spacewatch	·	1.9 km	MPC · JPL
877025	2009 SN_{204}	—	September 22, 2009	Kitt Peak	Spacewatch	·	1.3 km	MPC · JPL
877026	2009 SM_{223}	—	September 25, 2009	Mount Lemmon	Mount Lemmon Survey	·	1.4 km	MPC · JPL
877027	2009 SF_{230}	—	September 16, 2009	Catalina	CSS	·	1.9 km	MPC · JPL
877028	2009 ST_{234}	—	September 16, 2009	Mount Lemmon	Mount Lemmon Survey	·	3.7 km	MPC · JPL
877029	2009 SP_{235}	—	September 16, 2009	Kitt Peak	Spacewatch	·	1.6 km	MPC · JPL
877030	2009 SQ_{244}	—	September 17, 2009	Kitt Peak	Spacewatch	·	500 m	MPC · JPL
877031	2009 SQ_{247}	—	September 19, 2009	Catalina	CSS	T_{j} (2.9) · critical	3.4 km	MPC · JPL
877032	2009 SX_{252}	—	September 22, 2009	Kitt Peak	Spacewatch	·	920 m	MPC · JPL
877033	2009 SY_{268}	—	September 24, 2009	Kitt Peak	Spacewatch	·	850 m	MPC · JPL
877034	2009 SQ_{270}	—	September 24, 2009	Mount Lemmon	Mount Lemmon Survey	·	1.4 km	MPC · JPL
877035	2009 SW_{272}	—	September 25, 2009	Kitt Peak	Spacewatch	EOS	1.4 km	MPC · JPL
877036	2009 SV_{281}	—	September 25, 2009	Kitt Peak	Spacewatch	·	810 m	MPC · JPL
877037	2009 SJ_{286}	—	September 25, 2009	Kitt Peak	Spacewatch	·	1.6 km	MPC · JPL
877038	2009 SM_{290}	—	September 17, 2009	Kitt Peak	Spacewatch	·	580 m	MPC · JPL
877039	2009 SR_{321}	—	September 21, 2009	Kitt Peak	Spacewatch	PHO	1.3 km	MPC · JPL
877040	2009 SN_{333}	—	September 25, 2009	Catalina	CSS	·	1.2 km	MPC · JPL
877041	2009 SG_{343}	—	September 17, 2009	Kitt Peak	Spacewatch	·	400 m	MPC · JPL
877042	2009 SU_{353}	—	September 29, 2009	Mount Lemmon	Mount Lemmon Survey	·	1.7 km	MPC · JPL
877043	2009 SM_{368}	—	August 28, 2009	Kitt Peak	Spacewatch	·	1.1 km	MPC · JPL
877044	2009 SY_{370}	—	September 17, 2009	Mount Lemmon	Mount Lemmon Survey	·	1.3 km	MPC · JPL
877045	2009 SC_{374}	—	October 3, 2013	Mount Lemmon	Mount Lemmon Survey	·	890 m	MPC · JPL
877046	2009 SB_{376}	—	September 26, 2009	Kitt Peak	Spacewatch	T_{j} (2.97) · 3:2	3.7 km	MPC · JPL
877047	2009 SA_{378}	—	September 24, 2009	Mount Lemmon	Mount Lemmon Survey	·	590 m	MPC · JPL
877048	2009 SW_{378}	—	September 16, 2009	Mount Lemmon	Mount Lemmon Survey	·	670 m	MPC · JPL
877049	2009 SM_{388}	—	August 16, 2009	Kitt Peak	Spacewatch	GEF	740 m	MPC · JPL
877050	2009 SY_{392}	—	September 20, 2009	Kitt Peak	Spacewatch	·	1.4 km	MPC · JPL
877051	2009 SD_{395}	—	October 22, 2014	Catalina	CSS	·	1.6 km	MPC · JPL
877052	2009 SM_{397}	—	September 27, 2009	Kitt Peak	Spacewatch	·	2.0 km	MPC · JPL
877053	2009 SC_{399}	—	September 21, 2009	Mount Lemmon	Mount Lemmon Survey	·	1.2 km	MPC · JPL
877054	2009 SE_{399}	—	September 28, 2009	Mount Lemmon	Mount Lemmon Survey	·	1.5 km	MPC · JPL
877055	2009 SE_{405}	—	September 20, 2009	Catalina	CSS	·	1.1 km	MPC · JPL
877056	2009 SJ_{410}	—	September 18, 2009	Kitt Peak	Spacewatch	AEG	1.8 km	MPC · JPL
877057	2009 SM_{411}	—	September 18, 2009	Mount Lemmon	Mount Lemmon Survey	·	2.0 km	MPC · JPL
877058	2009 SE_{414}	—	September 17, 2009	Mount Lemmon	Mount Lemmon Survey	·	560 m	MPC · JPL
877059	2009 SU_{419}	—	September 27, 2009	Kitt Peak	Spacewatch	·	650 m	MPC · JPL
877060	2009 TY	—	September 16, 2009	Kitt Peak	Spacewatch	·	480 m	MPC · JPL
877061	2009 TE_{26}	—	September 14, 2009	Kitt Peak	Spacewatch	·	1.3 km	MPC · JPL
877062	2009 TQ_{42}	—	October 12, 2009	Mount Lemmon	Mount Lemmon Survey	·	1.3 km	MPC · JPL
877063	2009 TU_{49}	—	September 18, 2009	Kitt Peak	Spacewatch	·	1.1 km	MPC · JPL
877064	2009 TE_{52}	—	December 10, 2017	Mauna Loa	ATLAS	H	410 m	MPC · JPL
877065	2009 UE_{9}	—	October 16, 2009	Mount Lemmon	Mount Lemmon Survey	·	500 m	MPC · JPL
877066	2009 UV_{11}	—	October 2, 2009	Mount Lemmon	Mount Lemmon Survey	·	1.3 km	MPC · JPL
877067	2009 UH_{17}	—	October 22, 2009	Mount Lemmon	Mount Lemmon Survey	·	1.1 km	MPC · JPL
877068	2009 UN_{18}	—	September 19, 2009	Kitt Peak	Spacewatch	·	510 m	MPC · JPL
877069	2009 UC_{21}	—	October 22, 2009	Mount Lemmon	Mount Lemmon Survey	·	1.8 km	MPC · JPL
877070	2009 UZ_{24}	—	September 16, 2009	Mount Lemmon	Mount Lemmon Survey	·	1.2 km	MPC · JPL
877071	2009 UD_{33}	—	October 18, 2009	Mount Lemmon	Mount Lemmon Survey	·	1.2 km	MPC · JPL
877072	2009 UC_{46}	—	October 18, 2009	Mount Lemmon	Mount Lemmon Survey	·	1.8 km	MPC · JPL
877073	2009 UM_{51}	—	October 22, 2009	Mount Lemmon	Mount Lemmon Survey	·	1.2 km	MPC · JPL
877074	2009 UU_{54}	—	October 23, 2009	Mount Lemmon	Mount Lemmon Survey	·	1.7 km	MPC · JPL
877075	2009 UE_{61}	—	October 17, 2009	Mount Lemmon	Mount Lemmon Survey	·	1.2 km	MPC · JPL
877076	2009 UY_{68}	—	August 29, 2009	Kitt Peak	Spacewatch	·	870 m	MPC · JPL
877077	2009 UW_{70}	—	October 22, 2009	Mount Lemmon	Mount Lemmon Survey	·	1.2 km	MPC · JPL
877078	2009 UK_{74}	—	October 21, 2009	Mount Lemmon	Mount Lemmon Survey	·	1.4 km	MPC · JPL
877079	2009 UR_{74}	—	September 28, 2009	Kitt Peak	Spacewatch	·	2.6 km	MPC · JPL
877080	2009 UC_{81}	—	September 22, 2009	Mount Lemmon	Mount Lemmon Survey	·	1.5 km	MPC · JPL
877081	2009 UM_{83}	—	October 23, 2009	Mount Lemmon	Mount Lemmon Survey	critical	540 m	MPC · JPL
877082	2009 UQ_{91}	—	October 18, 2009	Catalina	CSS	·	3.5 km	MPC · JPL
877083	2009 UX_{91}	—	September 29, 2009	Mount Lemmon	Mount Lemmon Survey	·	1.4 km	MPC · JPL
877084	2009 UU_{97}	—	October 23, 2009	Mount Lemmon	Mount Lemmon Survey	·	2.8 km	MPC · JPL
877085	2009 US_{99}	—	October 23, 2009	Mount Lemmon	Mount Lemmon Survey	·	680 m	MPC · JPL
877086	2009 UX_{101}	—	October 24, 2009	Catalina	CSS	·	2.2 km	MPC · JPL
877087	2009 UN_{106}	—	September 21, 2009	Mount Lemmon	Mount Lemmon Survey	·	2.0 km	MPC · JPL
877088	2009 UM_{109}	—	October 27, 2005	Mount Lemmon	Mount Lemmon Survey	·	680 m	MPC · JPL
877089	2009 US_{109}	—	October 23, 2009	Mount Lemmon	Mount Lemmon Survey	·	1.6 km	MPC · JPL
877090	2009 UE_{127}	—	September 21, 2009	Catalina	CSS	·	560 m	MPC · JPL
877091	2009 UM_{127}	—	October 26, 2009	La Sagra	OAM	·	2.1 km	MPC · JPL
877092	2009 UE_{163}	—	October 26, 2009	Kitt Peak	Spacewatch	·	510 m	MPC · JPL
877093	2009 UX_{163}	—	October 23, 2009	Mount Lemmon	Mount Lemmon Survey	(5)	710 m	MPC · JPL
877094	2009 UB_{165}	—	October 21, 2009	Mount Lemmon	Mount Lemmon Survey	·	690 m	MPC · JPL
877095	2009 UB_{167}	—	October 18, 2009	Mount Lemmon	Mount Lemmon Survey	·	1.4 km	MPC · JPL
877096	2009 UY_{169}	—	October 25, 2009	Kitt Peak	Spacewatch	·	1.3 km	MPC · JPL
877097	2009 US_{171}	—	October 24, 2009	Kitt Peak	Spacewatch	·	1.5 km	MPC · JPL
877098	2009 UT_{171}	—	October 23, 2009	Kitt Peak	Spacewatch	·	1.3 km	MPC · JPL
877099	2009 UB_{178}	—	October 27, 2009	Kitt Peak	Spacewatch	·	2.3 km	MPC · JPL
877100	2009 UH_{181}	—	October 23, 2009	Mount Lemmon	Mount Lemmon Survey	·	1.3 km	MPC · JPL

== 877101–877200 ==
back to top

Designation			Discovery			Properties		Ref
Permanent	Provisional	Named after	Date	Site	Discoverer(s)	Category	Diam.	Ref
877101	2009 UK_{183}	—	October 23, 2009	Mount Lemmon	Mount Lemmon Survey	·	1.3 km	MPC · JPL
877102	2009 UJ_{184}	—	October 17, 2009	Mount Lemmon	Mount Lemmon Survey	TIR	2.2 km	MPC · JPL
877103	2009 UO_{189}	—	October 16, 2009	Mount Lemmon	Mount Lemmon Survey	·	1.5 km	MPC · JPL
877104	2009 UG_{193}	—	October 26, 2009	Kitt Peak	Spacewatch	·	1.1 km	MPC · JPL
877105	2009 VL_{5}	—	October 22, 2009	Catalina	CSS	·	1.4 km	MPC · JPL
877106	2009 VY_{13}	—	November 8, 2009	Mount Lemmon	Mount Lemmon Survey	·	2.6 km	MPC · JPL
877107	2009 VS_{16}	—	October 26, 2009	Mount Lemmon	Mount Lemmon Survey	·	2.0 km	MPC · JPL
877108	2009 VA_{22}	—	November 9, 2009	Mount Lemmon	Mount Lemmon Survey	·	1.7 km	MPC · JPL
877109	2009 VG_{22}	—	September 19, 2009	Mount Lemmon	Mount Lemmon Survey	·	3.0 km	MPC · JPL
877110	2009 VP_{22}	—	November 9, 2009	Mount Lemmon	Mount Lemmon Survey	·	980 m	MPC · JPL
877111	2009 VV_{31}	—	September 21, 2009	Mount Lemmon	Mount Lemmon Survey	·	1.4 km	MPC · JPL
877112	2009 VN_{32}	—	October 17, 2009	Mount Lemmon	Mount Lemmon Survey	EUN	650 m	MPC · JPL
877113	2009 VD_{43}	—	November 9, 2009	Catalina	CSS	·	1.4 km	MPC · JPL
877114	2009 VU_{54}	—	October 15, 2009	La Sagra	OAM	·	3.1 km	MPC · JPL
877115	2009 VS_{69}	—	November 9, 2009	Mount Lemmon	Mount Lemmon Survey	·	1.2 km	MPC · JPL
877116	2009 VV_{81}	—	October 27, 2009	Kitt Peak	Spacewatch	·	2.5 km	MPC · JPL
877117	2009 VW_{81}	—	November 10, 2005	Mount Lemmon	Mount Lemmon Survey	·	570 m	MPC · JPL
877118	2009 VY_{87}	—	November 10, 2009	Kitt Peak	Spacewatch	KON	1.5 km	MPC · JPL
877119	2009 VU_{90}	—	November 11, 2009	Kitt Peak	Spacewatch	·	1.2 km	MPC · JPL
877120	2009 VG_{94}	—	November 9, 2009	Mount Lemmon	Mount Lemmon Survey	·	570 m	MPC · JPL
877121	2009 VJ_{97}	—	October 24, 2009	Kitt Peak	Spacewatch	·	1.7 km	MPC · JPL
877122	2009 VY_{103}	—	November 11, 2009	Catalina	CSS	T_{j} (2.94)	4.1 km	MPC · JPL
877123	2009 VH_{119}	—	November 9, 2009	Kitt Peak	Spacewatch	·	1.8 km	MPC · JPL
877124	2009 VJ_{120}	—	November 10, 2009	Kitt Peak	Spacewatch	(5)	830 m	MPC · JPL
877125	2009 VY_{120}	—	November 10, 2009	Kitt Peak	Spacewatch	·	570 m	MPC · JPL
877126	2009 VT_{121}	—	November 8, 2009	Kitt Peak	Spacewatch	THM	1.4 km	MPC · JPL
877127	2009 VX_{121}	—	November 10, 2009	Mount Lemmon	Mount Lemmon Survey	·	620 m	MPC · JPL
877128	2009 VM_{123}	—	November 9, 2009	Mount Lemmon	Mount Lemmon Survey	·	1.3 km	MPC · JPL
877129	2009 VN_{128}	—	November 9, 2009	Kitt Peak	Spacewatch	critical	2.0 km	MPC · JPL
877130	2009 VY_{128}	—	November 8, 2009	Mount Lemmon	Mount Lemmon Survey	·	1.9 km	MPC · JPL
877131	2009 VN_{131}	—	November 10, 2009	Mount Lemmon	Mount Lemmon Survey	·	1.7 km	MPC · JPL
877132	2009 WZ	—	November 16, 2009	La Silla	La Silla	·	690 m	MPC · JPL
877133	2009 WA_{7}	—	July 5, 2002	Palomar	NEAT	·	450 m	MPC · JPL
877134	2009 WJ_{15}	—	November 16, 2009	Mount Lemmon	Mount Lemmon Survey	·	1.1 km	MPC · JPL
877135	2009 WY_{22}	—	November 18, 2009	Kitt Peak	Spacewatch	·	520 m	MPC · JPL
877136	2009 WG_{26}	—	October 27, 2009	Mount Lemmon	Mount Lemmon Survey	H	460 m	MPC · JPL
877137	2009 WC_{27}	—	October 27, 2009	Kitt Peak	Spacewatch	·	1.6 km	MPC · JPL
877138	2009 WJ_{28}	—	October 22, 2009	Mount Lemmon	Mount Lemmon Survey	·	1.3 km	MPC · JPL
877139	2009 WD_{30}	—	November 16, 2009	Mount Lemmon	Mount Lemmon Survey	·	1.2 km	MPC · JPL
877140	2009 WT_{35}	—	October 14, 2009	Catalina	CSS	·	2.3 km	MPC · JPL
877141	2009 WF_{39}	—	November 26, 2005	Mount Lemmon	Mount Lemmon Survey	·	1.1 km	MPC · JPL
877142	2009 WL_{39}	—	November 17, 2009	Kitt Peak	Spacewatch	·	2.6 km	MPC · JPL
877143	2009 WO_{48}	—	November 19, 2009	Mount Lemmon	Mount Lemmon Survey	·	1.5 km	MPC · JPL
877144	2009 WW_{51}	—	November 16, 2009	Mount Lemmon	Mount Lemmon Survey	·	430 m	MPC · JPL
877145	2009 WW_{62}	—	November 1, 2005	Mount Lemmon	Mount Lemmon Survey	·	710 m	MPC · JPL
877146	2009 WJ_{63}	—	November 16, 2009	Mount Lemmon	Mount Lemmon Survey	·	790 m	MPC · JPL
877147	2009 WO_{64}	—	November 16, 2009	Mount Lemmon	Mount Lemmon Survey	·	780 m	MPC · JPL
877148	2009 WE_{68}	—	November 17, 2009	Mount Lemmon	Mount Lemmon Survey	(5)	720 m	MPC · JPL
877149	2009 WN_{72}	—	November 18, 2009	Kitt Peak	Spacewatch	·	2.5 km	MPC · JPL
877150	2009 WC_{81}	—	November 18, 2009	Kitt Peak	Spacewatch	T_{j} (2.99) · 3:2	3.6 km	MPC · JPL
877151	2009 WS_{82}	—	November 19, 2009	Kitt Peak	Spacewatch	·	2.6 km	MPC · JPL
877152	2009 WW_{82}	—	November 11, 2009	Kitt Peak	Spacewatch	·	1.4 km	MPC · JPL
877153	2009 WX_{82}	—	November 11, 2009	Kitt Peak	Spacewatch	·	1.7 km	MPC · JPL
877154	2009 WF_{85}	—	November 19, 2009	Kitt Peak	Spacewatch	·	1.4 km	MPC · JPL
877155	2009 WJ_{87}	—	November 11, 2009	Kitt Peak	Spacewatch	·	1.8 km	MPC · JPL
877156	2009 WX_{90}	—	November 19, 2009	Kitt Peak	Spacewatch	·	840 m	MPC · JPL
877157	2009 WG_{92}	—	November 11, 2009	Kitt Peak	Spacewatch	·	710 m	MPC · JPL
877158	2009 WX_{96}	—	November 20, 2009	Mount Lemmon	Mount Lemmon Survey	·	1.7 km	MPC · JPL
877159	2009 WM_{98}	—	October 12, 2009	Mount Lemmon	Mount Lemmon Survey	·	1.4 km	MPC · JPL
877160	2009 WO_{100}	—	October 18, 2009	Mount Lemmon	Mount Lemmon Survey	·	1.2 km	MPC · JPL
877161	2009 WR_{100}	—	October 23, 2009	Mount Lemmon	Mount Lemmon Survey	·	2.2 km	MPC · JPL
877162	2009 WX_{112}	—	April 14, 2008	Mount Lemmon	Mount Lemmon Survey	H	370 m	MPC · JPL
877163	2009 WY_{115}	—	November 19, 2009	Mount Lemmon	Mount Lemmon Survey	H	270 m	MPC · JPL
877164	2009 WZ_{121}	—	November 8, 2009	Kitt Peak	Spacewatch	·	2.7 km	MPC · JPL
877165	2009 WQ_{123}	—	November 10, 2009	Kitt Peak	Spacewatch	·	2.3 km	MPC · JPL
877166	2009 WX_{124}	—	November 20, 2009	Kitt Peak	Spacewatch	·	4.2 km	MPC · JPL
877167	2009 WU_{130}	—	November 20, 2009	Mount Lemmon	Mount Lemmon Survey	MAR	680 m	MPC · JPL
877168	2009 WW_{135}	—	October 23, 2009	Mount Lemmon	Mount Lemmon Survey	·	1.4 km	MPC · JPL
877169	2009 WG_{138}	—	November 9, 2009	Mount Lemmon	Mount Lemmon Survey	·	680 m	MPC · JPL
877170	2009 WR_{138}	—	September 21, 2009	Mount Lemmon	Mount Lemmon Survey	·	1.1 km	MPC · JPL
877171	2009 WN_{147}	—	November 19, 2009	Mount Lemmon	Mount Lemmon Survey	·	760 m	MPC · JPL
877172	2009 WU_{151}	—	November 19, 2009	Mount Lemmon	Mount Lemmon Survey	·	1.4 km	MPC · JPL
877173	2009 WH_{156}	—	November 20, 2009	Kitt Peak	Spacewatch	·	520 m	MPC · JPL
877174	2009 WG_{158}	—	November 20, 2009	Mount Lemmon	Mount Lemmon Survey	·	1.5 km	MPC · JPL
877175	2009 WT_{160}	—	October 26, 2009	Mount Lemmon	Mount Lemmon Survey	·	3.5 km	MPC · JPL
877176	2009 WL_{163}	—	November 21, 2009	Kitt Peak	Spacewatch	TIR	2.0 km	MPC · JPL
877177	2009 WA_{170}	—	November 22, 2009	Kitt Peak	Spacewatch	·	2.7 km	MPC · JPL
877178	2009 WN_{170}	—	September 30, 2009	Mount Lemmon	Mount Lemmon Survey	·	1.6 km	MPC · JPL
877179	2009 WW_{175}	—	November 18, 2009	Kitt Peak	Spacewatch	·	3.2 km	MPC · JPL
877180	2009 WQ_{176}	—	November 11, 2009	Kitt Peak	Spacewatch	·	670 m	MPC · JPL
877181	2009 WG_{177}	—	October 26, 2009	Kitt Peak	Spacewatch	·	1.3 km	MPC · JPL
877182	2009 WU_{179}	—	November 23, 2009	Mount Lemmon	Mount Lemmon Survey	·	690 m	MPC · JPL
877183	2009 WC_{183}	—	November 11, 2009	Kitt Peak	Spacewatch	·	580 m	MPC · JPL
877184	2009 WQ_{186}	—	November 24, 2009	Mount Lemmon	Mount Lemmon Survey	·	2.0 km	MPC · JPL
877185	2009 WF_{197}	—	November 25, 2009	Mount Lemmon	Mount Lemmon Survey	·	1.3 km	MPC · JPL
877186	2009 WP_{198}	—	November 26, 2009	Mount Lemmon	Mount Lemmon Survey	·	3.0 km	MPC · JPL
877187	2009 WC_{202}	—	November 26, 2009	Mount Lemmon	Mount Lemmon Survey	·	550 m	MPC · JPL
877188	2009 WD_{239}	—	November 17, 2009	Mount Lemmon	Mount Lemmon Survey	·	640 m	MPC · JPL
877189	2009 WT_{239}	—	November 17, 2009	Mount Lemmon	Mount Lemmon Survey	·	840 m	MPC · JPL
877190	2009 WG_{240}	—	November 17, 2009	Mount Lemmon	Mount Lemmon Survey	·	4.0 km	MPC · JPL
877191	2009 WW_{270}	—	November 10, 2005	Mount Lemmon	Mount Lemmon Survey	·	780 m	MPC · JPL
877192	2009 WL_{271}	—	November 21, 2009	Mount Lemmon	Mount Lemmon Survey	·	740 m	MPC · JPL
877193	2009 WP_{272}	—	November 16, 2009	Mount Lemmon	Mount Lemmon Survey	(5)	840 m	MPC · JPL
877194	2009 WQ_{273}	—	November 2, 2013	Kitt Peak	Spacewatch	·	840 m	MPC · JPL
877195	2009 WG_{274}	—	November 27, 2009	Mount Lemmon	Mount Lemmon Survey	·	1.4 km	MPC · JPL
877196	2009 WS_{274}	—	November 7, 2013	Mount Lemmon	Mount Lemmon Survey	·	690 m	MPC · JPL
877197	2009 WY_{274}	—	November 20, 2009	Kitt Peak	Spacewatch	·	820 m	MPC · JPL
877198	2009 WN_{275}	—	November 16, 2009	Mount Lemmon	Mount Lemmon Survey	(5)	890 m	MPC · JPL
877199	2009 WW_{275}	—	November 23, 2009	Mount Lemmon	Mount Lemmon Survey	EUN	910 m	MPC · JPL
877200	2009 WZ_{275}	—	December 25, 2013	Mount Lemmon	Mount Lemmon Survey	·	880 m	MPC · JPL

== 877201–877300 ==
back to top

Designation			Discovery			Properties		Ref
Permanent	Provisional	Named after	Date	Site	Discoverer(s)	Category	Diam.	Ref
877201	2009 WG_{276}	—	November 1, 2013	Mount Lemmon	Mount Lemmon Survey	MAR	590 m	MPC · JPL
877202	2009 WS_{276}	—	April 18, 2012	Mount Lemmon	Mount Lemmon Survey	·	700 m	MPC · JPL
877203	2009 WH_{277}	—	November 23, 2009	Mount Lemmon	Mount Lemmon Survey	·	2.9 km	MPC · JPL
877204	2009 WK_{277}	—	November 18, 2009	Kitt Peak	Spacewatch	·	540 m	MPC · JPL
877205	2009 WF_{278}	—	November 26, 2009	Mount Lemmon	Mount Lemmon Survey	H	420 m	MPC · JPL
877206	2009 WY_{280}	—	January 23, 2011	Mount Lemmon	Mount Lemmon Survey	3:2 · SHU	3.2 km	MPC · JPL
877207	2009 WS_{281}	—	October 23, 2017	Mount Lemmon	Mount Lemmon Survey	·	1.0 km	MPC · JPL
877208	2009 WB_{283}	—	November 20, 2009	Kitt Peak	Spacewatch	·	1.2 km	MPC · JPL
877209	2009 WU_{284}	—	October 1, 2014	Haleakala	Pan-STARRS 1	EOS	1.3 km	MPC · JPL
877210	2009 WF_{286}	—	October 26, 2014	Mount Lemmon	Mount Lemmon Survey	·	1.8 km	MPC · JPL
877211	2009 WS_{292}	—	November 21, 2009	Mount Lemmon	Mount Lemmon Survey	·	2.4 km	MPC · JPL
877212	2009 WG_{293}	—	November 26, 2009	Mount Lemmon	Mount Lemmon Survey	·	1.8 km	MPC · JPL
877213	2009 WN_{293}	—	November 16, 2009	Mount Lemmon	Mount Lemmon Survey	·	710 m	MPC · JPL
877214	2009 WP_{293}	—	November 23, 2009	Mount Lemmon	Mount Lemmon Survey	·	2.3 km	MPC · JPL
877215	2009 WY_{299}	—	November 27, 2009	Mount Lemmon	Mount Lemmon Survey	·	770 m	MPC · JPL
877216	2009 XC_{3}	—	December 8, 2009	La Sagra	OAM	·	3.1 km	MPC · JPL
877217	2009 XR_{10}	—	November 24, 2009	Kitt Peak	Spacewatch	·	370 m	MPC · JPL
877218	2009 XT_{27}	—	November 17, 2014	Mount Lemmon	Mount Lemmon Survey	·	1.8 km	MPC · JPL
877219	2009 XX_{30}	—	December 10, 2009	Mount Lemmon	Mount Lemmon Survey	3:2	3.4 km	MPC · JPL
877220	2009 YW	—	December 16, 2009	Kitt Peak	Spacewatch	·	900 m	MPC · JPL
877221	2009 YC_{1}	—	December 16, 2009	Mount Lemmon	Mount Lemmon Survey	·	1.8 km	MPC · JPL
877222	2009 YJ_{1}	—	November 17, 2009	Mount Lemmon	Mount Lemmon Survey	JUN	750 m	MPC · JPL
877223	2009 YT_{3}	—	December 17, 2009	Kitt Peak	Spacewatch	·	2.2 km	MPC · JPL
877224	2009 YE_{4}	—	December 17, 2009	Mount Lemmon	Mount Lemmon Survey	·	1.9 km	MPC · JPL
877225	2009 YA_{11}	—	December 18, 2009	Kitt Peak	Spacewatch	H	430 m	MPC · JPL
877226	2009 YE_{16}	—	November 21, 2009	Mount Lemmon	Mount Lemmon Survey	·	740 m	MPC · JPL
877227	2009 YO_{17}	—	December 20, 2009	Kitt Peak	Spacewatch	·	3.2 km	MPC · JPL
877228	2009 YH_{20}	—	December 18, 2009	Kitt Peak	Spacewatch	·	2.2 km	MPC · JPL
877229	2009 YW_{25}	—	October 27, 2005	Kitt Peak	Spacewatch	·	750 m	MPC · JPL
877230	2009 YE_{28}	—	December 19, 2009	Mount Lemmon	Mount Lemmon Survey	·	1.1 km	MPC · JPL
877231	2009 YJ_{28}	—	December 18, 2009	Kitt Peak	Spacewatch	·	760 m	MPC · JPL
877232	2009 YM_{28}	—	December 18, 2009	Mount Lemmon	Mount Lemmon Survey	·	2.6 km	MPC · JPL
877233	2009 YD_{34}	—	December 18, 2009	Kitt Peak	Spacewatch	·	880 m	MPC · JPL
877234	2009 YE_{34}	—	December 18, 2009	Mount Lemmon	Mount Lemmon Survey	(5)	760 m	MPC · JPL
877235	2009 YY_{34}	—	December 26, 2009	Kitt Peak	Spacewatch	LUT	3.0 km	MPC · JPL
877236	2010 AE_{18}	—	November 21, 2009	Mount Lemmon	Mount Lemmon Survey	·	1.5 km	MPC · JPL
877237	2010 AD_{20}	—	December 18, 2009	Mount Lemmon	Mount Lemmon Survey	THM	2.5 km	MPC · JPL
877238	2010 AD_{26}	—	January 6, 2010	Kitt Peak	Spacewatch	·	2.2 km	MPC · JPL
877239	2010 AO_{38}	—	November 22, 2009	Kitt Peak	Spacewatch	·	2.9 km	MPC · JPL
877240	2010 AF_{39}	—	December 20, 2009	Mount Lemmon	Mount Lemmon Survey	·	1.9 km	MPC · JPL
877241	2010 AR_{47}	—	January 8, 2010	Kitt Peak	Spacewatch	·	780 m	MPC · JPL
877242	2010 AC_{49}	—	November 26, 2009	Mount Lemmon	Mount Lemmon Survey	critical	1.7 km	MPC · JPL
877243	2010 AS_{51}	—	January 8, 2010	Mount Lemmon	Mount Lemmon Survey	·	2.6 km	MPC · JPL
877244	2010 AP_{62}	—	December 18, 2009	Mount Lemmon	Mount Lemmon Survey	·	3.0 km	MPC · JPL
877245	2010 AM_{77}	—	November 16, 2009	Mount Lemmon	Mount Lemmon Survey	T_{j} (2.98)	2.5 km	MPC · JPL
877246	2010 AO_{78}	—	December 17, 2009	Kitt Peak	Spacewatch	·	1.3 km	MPC · JPL
877247	2010 AS_{87}	—	October 17, 2009	Catalina	CSS	·	1.8 km	MPC · JPL
877248	2010 AT_{90}	—	January 8, 2010	WISE	WISE	·	920 m	MPC · JPL
877249	2010 AO_{97}	—	November 4, 2004	Kitt Peak	Spacewatch	T_{j} (2.99)	2.7 km	MPC · JPL
877250	2010 AZ_{97}	—	November 9, 2008	Mount Lemmon	Mount Lemmon Survey	T_{j} (2.98) · EUP	3.1 km	MPC · JPL
877251	2010 AG_{103}	—	January 14, 2016	Haleakala	Pan-STARRS 1	·	2.0 km	MPC · JPL
877252	2010 AV_{108}	—	January 12, 2010	WISE	WISE	·	2.3 km	MPC · JPL
877253	2010 AP_{109}	—	September 29, 2009	Mount Lemmon	Mount Lemmon Survey	·	1.9 km	MPC · JPL
877254	2010 AE_{118}	—	January 13, 2010	WISE	WISE	·	3.4 km	MPC · JPL
877255	2010 AM_{128}	—	January 14, 2010	WISE	WISE	·	1.4 km	MPC · JPL
877256	2010 AX_{142}	—	January 7, 2010	Kitt Peak	Spacewatch	·	2.0 km	MPC · JPL
877257	2010 AF_{156}	—	October 8, 2012	Haleakala	Pan-STARRS 1	·	470 m	MPC · JPL
877258	2010 AR_{156}	—	January 11, 2010	Mount Lemmon	Mount Lemmon Survey	H	420 m	MPC · JPL
877259	2010 AY_{156}	—	January 16, 1999	Socorro	LINEAR	T_{j} (2.98)	1.8 km	MPC · JPL
877260	2010 AE_{159}	—	November 27, 2013	Haleakala	Pan-STARRS 1	·	790 m	MPC · JPL
877261	2010 AR_{161}	—	January 12, 2010	Kitt Peak	Spacewatch	·	750 m	MPC · JPL
877262	2010 AO_{162}	—	January 8, 2010	Kitt Peak	Spacewatch	·	2.0 km	MPC · JPL
877263	2010 AX_{163}	—	January 6, 2010	Kitt Peak	Spacewatch	·	1.0 km	MPC · JPL
877264	2010 AO_{167}	—	January 10, 2010	Mount Lemmon	Mount Lemmon Survey	·	1.3 km	MPC · JPL
877265	2010 BR_{10}	—	October 2, 2009	Mount Lemmon	Mount Lemmon Survey	·	1.7 km	MPC · JPL
877266	2010 BQ_{14}	—	November 19, 2008	Kitt Peak	Spacewatch	·	3.1 km	MPC · JPL
877267	2010 BL_{16}	—	January 16, 2010	WISE	WISE	·	1.3 km	MPC · JPL
877268	2010 BR_{21}	—	January 17, 2010	WISE	WISE	·	1.6 km	MPC · JPL
877269	2010 BK_{29}	—	October 25, 2009	Kitt Peak	Spacewatch	·	1.2 km	MPC · JPL
877270	2010 BD_{37}	—	April 10, 2010	Mount Lemmon	Mount Lemmon Survey	·	820 m	MPC · JPL
877271	2010 BN_{42}	—	January 14, 2015	Haleakala	Pan-STARRS 1	T_{j} (2.99)	3.6 km	MPC · JPL
877272	2010 BK_{47}	—	October 2, 2009	Mount Lemmon	Mount Lemmon Survey	·	2.7 km	MPC · JPL
877273	2010 BZ_{50}	—	October 17, 2009	Catalina	CSS	·	1.5 km	MPC · JPL
877274	2010 BE_{66}	—	October 15, 2009	Catalina	CSS	·	690 m	MPC · JPL
877275	2010 BL_{66}	—	September 23, 2014	Mount Lemmon	Mount Lemmon Survey	·	1.6 km	MPC · JPL
877276	2010 BZ_{66}	—	January 22, 2010	WISE	WISE	·	2.2 km	MPC · JPL
877277	2010 BK_{80}	—	December 21, 2008	Kitt Peak	Spacewatch	·	2.4 km	MPC · JPL
877278	2010 BQ_{90}	—	December 17, 2009	Mount Lemmon	Mount Lemmon Survey	T_{j} (2.99) · 3:2	4.0 km	MPC · JPL
877279	2010 BA_{92}	—	October 24, 2009	Mount Lemmon	Mount Lemmon Survey	·	2.7 km	MPC · JPL
877280	2010 BK_{94}	—	January 27, 2010	WISE	WISE	·	2.6 km	MPC · JPL
877281	2010 BV_{94}	—	November 25, 2009	Mount Lemmon	Mount Lemmon Survey	·	3.2 km	MPC · JPL
877282	2010 BH_{103}	—	November 9, 2009	Mount Lemmon	Mount Lemmon Survey	·	4.3 km	MPC · JPL
877283	2010 BW_{117}	—	December 19, 2009	Mount Lemmon	Mount Lemmon Survey	·	2.5 km	MPC · JPL
877284	2010 BQ_{124}	—	January 13, 2010	Mount Lemmon	Mount Lemmon Survey	T_{j} (2.93)	1.2 km	MPC · JPL
877285	2010 BJ_{125}	—	November 10, 2009	Catalina	CSS	EUP	2.9 km	MPC · JPL
877286	2010 BJ_{148}	—	April 9, 2010	Catalina	CSS	·	1.7 km	MPC · JPL
877287	2010 BL_{148}	—	January 24, 2015	Haleakala	Pan-STARRS 1	·	1.9 km	MPC · JPL
877288	2010 BG_{152}	—	October 28, 2017	Haleakala	Pan-STARRS 1	3:2 · SHU	3.7 km	MPC · JPL
877289	2010 BZ_{152}	—	October 27, 2017	Haleakala	Pan-STARRS 1	·	530 m	MPC · JPL
877290	2010 BO_{153}	—	October 30, 2009	Mount Lemmon	Mount Lemmon Survey	·	650 m	MPC · JPL
877291	2010 CP_{5}	—	February 9, 2010	Catalina	CSS	·	2.7 km	MPC · JPL
877292	2010 CD_{21}	—	February 9, 2010	Kitt Peak	Spacewatch	·	1 km	MPC · JPL
877293	2010 CK_{30}	—	December 20, 2009	Mount Lemmon	Mount Lemmon Survey	·	3.5 km	MPC · JPL
877294	2010 CR_{38}	—	February 13, 2010	Mount Lemmon	Mount Lemmon Survey	MAS	550 m	MPC · JPL
877295	2010 CY_{38}	—	February 13, 2010	Mount Lemmon	Mount Lemmon Survey	·	980 m	MPC · JPL
877296	2010 CS_{45}	—	November 21, 2009	Kitt Peak	Spacewatch	LIX	2.7 km	MPC · JPL
877297	2010 CW_{51}	—	November 17, 2009	Kitt Peak	Spacewatch	·	3.1 km	MPC · JPL
877298	2010 CC_{57}	—	February 13, 2010	Socorro	LINEAR	·	2.8 km	MPC · JPL
877299	2010 CF_{96}	—	February 14, 2010	Mount Lemmon	Mount Lemmon Survey	·	1.9 km	MPC · JPL
877300	2010 CZ_{96}	—	February 14, 2010	Mount Lemmon	Mount Lemmon Survey	TIR	1.6 km	MPC · JPL

== 877301–877400 ==
back to top

Designation			Discovery			Properties		Ref
Permanent	Provisional	Named after	Date	Site	Discoverer(s)	Category	Diam.	Ref
877301	2010 CS_{97}	—	September 28, 2003	Sacramento Peak	SDSS	·	1.7 km	MPC · JPL
877302	2010 CF_{111}	—	January 12, 2010	Kitt Peak	Spacewatch	·	3.1 km	MPC · JPL
877303	2010 CL_{111}	—	February 14, 2010	Mount Lemmon	Mount Lemmon Survey	·	600 m	MPC · JPL
877304	2010 CS_{112}	—	March 25, 2006	Kitt Peak	Spacewatch	·	960 m	MPC · JPL
877305	2010 CQ_{123}	—	February 15, 2010	Kitt Peak	Spacewatch	·	1.0 km	MPC · JPL
877306	2010 CS_{128}	—	January 8, 2010	Kitt Peak	Spacewatch	·	2.7 km	MPC · JPL
877307	2010 CJ_{131}	—	November 25, 2009	Kitt Peak	Spacewatch	3:2	3.5 km	MPC · JPL
877308	2010 CU_{132}	—	February 15, 2010	WISE	WISE	·	3.2 km	MPC · JPL
877309	2010 CR_{133}	—	March 16, 2004	Kitt Peak	Spacewatch	·	2.8 km	MPC · JPL
877310	2010 CV_{135}	—	September 19, 2003	Kitt Peak	Spacewatch	·	1.7 km	MPC · JPL
877311	2010 CF_{137}	—	November 24, 2009	Mount Lemmon	Mount Lemmon Survey	·	810 m	MPC · JPL
877312	2010 CL_{138}	—	January 12, 2010	Mount Lemmon	Mount Lemmon Survey	·	1.2 km	MPC · JPL
877313	2010 CW_{139}	—	February 23, 2007	Mount Lemmon	Mount Lemmon Survey	·	1.1 km	MPC · JPL
877314	2010 CJ_{140}	—	February 15, 2010	WISE	WISE	·	1.6 km	MPC · JPL
877315	2010 CL_{141}	—	February 14, 2010	Kitt Peak	Spacewatch	·	670 m	MPC · JPL
877316	2010 CA_{147}	—	February 13, 2010	Kitt Peak	Spacewatch	KON	1.8 km	MPC · JPL
877317	2010 CH_{154}	—	February 15, 2010	Kitt Peak	Spacewatch	·	3.2 km	MPC · JPL
877318	2010 CG_{157}	—	February 9, 2010	Kitt Peak	Spacewatch	·	930 m	MPC · JPL
877319	2010 CE_{159}	—	January 11, 2010	Kitt Peak	Spacewatch	·	2.1 km	MPC · JPL
877320	2010 CD_{164}	—	January 6, 2010	Kitt Peak	Spacewatch	·	1.7 km	MPC · JPL
877321	2010 CR_{164}	—	February 10, 2010	Kitt Peak	Spacewatch	·	1.6 km	MPC · JPL
877322	2010 CC_{166}	—	December 1, 2003	Kitt Peak	Spacewatch	·	1.4 km	MPC · JPL
877323	2010 CD_{178}	—	February 13, 2010	Mount Lemmon	Mount Lemmon Survey	(5)	740 m	MPC · JPL
877324	2010 CX_{185}	—	November 10, 2009	Kitt Peak	Spacewatch	·	2.5 km	MPC · JPL
877325	2010 CQ_{188}	—	February 11, 2010	WISE	WISE	·	720 m	MPC · JPL
877326	2010 CT_{195}	—	February 13, 2010	WISE	WISE	T_{j} (2.99) · 3:2	4.3 km	MPC · JPL
877327	2010 CW_{196}	—	November 21, 2009	Catalina	CSS	·	810 m	MPC · JPL
877328	2010 CY_{197}	—	January 9, 2016	Haleakala	Pan-STARRS 1	·	1.9 km	MPC · JPL
877329	2010 CJ_{200}	—	February 15, 2010	WISE	WISE	·	1.9 km	MPC · JPL
877330	2010 CC_{218}	—	January 2, 2009	Kitt Peak	Spacewatch	·	2.3 km	MPC · JPL
877331	2010 CA_{221}	—	February 7, 2010	WISE	WISE	·	1.5 km	MPC · JPL
877332	2010 CM_{232}	—	November 9, 2009	Mount Lemmon	Mount Lemmon Survey	·	1.9 km	MPC · JPL
877333	2010 CO_{232}	—	September 22, 2009	Mount Lemmon	Mount Lemmon Survey	·	1.9 km	MPC · JPL
877334	2010 CH_{235}	—	October 14, 2009	Mount Lemmon	Mount Lemmon Survey	·	2.2 km	MPC · JPL
877335	2010 CD_{238}	—	October 21, 2009	Mount Lemmon	Mount Lemmon Survey	·	1.6 km	MPC · JPL
877336	2010 CM_{240}	—	October 27, 2009	Mount Lemmon	Mount Lemmon Survey	EUP	3.4 km	MPC · JPL
877337	2010 CM_{259}	—	October 22, 2017	Haleakala	Pan-STARRS 1	(194)	830 m	MPC · JPL
877338	2010 CV_{259}	—	September 24, 2017	Haleakala	Pan-STARRS 1	·	640 m	MPC · JPL
877339	2010 CU_{272}	—	February 15, 2010	Mount Lemmon	Mount Lemmon Survey	·	1.4 km	MPC · JPL
877340	2010 CJ_{273}	—	February 14, 2010	Mount Lemmon	Mount Lemmon Survey	·	1.2 km	MPC · JPL
877341	2010 CW_{274}	—	February 15, 2010	Mount Lemmon	Mount Lemmon Survey	·	1.4 km	MPC · JPL
877342	2010 DQ	—	January 12, 2010	Mount Lemmon	Mount Lemmon Survey	·	3.4 km	MPC · JPL
877343	2010 DH_{1}	—	February 17, 2010	Mount Lemmon	Mount Lemmon Survey	·	290 m	MPC · JPL
877344	2010 DK_{1}	—	February 17, 2010	Calvin-Rehoboth	L. A. Molnar	·	3.1 km	MPC · JPL
877345	2010 DB_{12}	—	February 16, 2010	Mount Lemmon	Mount Lemmon Survey	·	810 m	MPC · JPL
877346	2010 DA_{23}	—	November 27, 2009	Mount Lemmon	Mount Lemmon Survey	·	1.7 km	MPC · JPL
877347	2010 DX_{25}	—	May 6, 2006	Mount Lemmon	Mount Lemmon Survey	·	3.6 km	MPC · JPL
877348	2010 DC_{32}	—	November 20, 2009	Kitt Peak	Spacewatch	·	1.3 km	MPC · JPL
877349	2010 DT_{41}	—	February 17, 2010	Mount Lemmon	Mount Lemmon Survey	LIX	2.8 km	MPC · JPL
877350	2010 DZ_{55}	—	February 22, 2010	WISE	WISE	EUP	2.1 km	MPC · JPL
877351	2010 DZ_{66}	—	February 27, 2010	WISE	WISE	·	1.5 km	MPC · JPL
877352	2010 DC_{70}	—	September 30, 2009	Mount Lemmon	Mount Lemmon Survey	T_{j} (2.98)	2.8 km	MPC · JPL
877353	2010 DJ_{84}	—	February 25, 2010	WISE	WISE	·	1.6 km	MPC · JPL
877354	2010 DZ_{84}	—	February 25, 2010	WISE	WISE	·	590 m	MPC · JPL
877355	2010 DA_{93}	—	January 24, 2014	Haleakala	Pan-STARRS 1	·	920 m	MPC · JPL
877356	2010 DD_{102}	—	January 14, 2016	Haleakala	Pan-STARRS 1	·	1.8 km	MPC · JPL
877357	2010 DN_{109}	—	August 12, 2013	Kitt Peak	Spacewatch	·	1.8 km	MPC · JPL
877358	2010 DE_{111}	—	February 16, 2010	Mount Lemmon	Mount Lemmon Survey	·	2.2 km	MPC · JPL
877359	2010 DB_{117}	—	February 18, 2010	Mount Lemmon	Mount Lemmon Survey	·	1.5 km	MPC · JPL
877360	2010 EU_{4}	—	January 6, 2010	Mount Lemmon	Mount Lemmon Survey	·	2.0 km	MPC · JPL
877361	2010 EL_{10}	—	December 20, 2009	Mount Lemmon	Mount Lemmon Survey	3:2	5.0 km	MPC · JPL
877362	2010 EE_{32}	—	March 4, 2010	Kitt Peak	Spacewatch	·	2.8 km	MPC · JPL
877363	2010 EQ_{106}	—	February 17, 2010	Kitt Peak	Spacewatch	·	2.3 km	MPC · JPL
877364	2010 EU_{117}	—	January 4, 2010	Kitt Peak	Spacewatch	·	1.8 km	MPC · JPL
877365	2010 EE_{119}	—	October 21, 2003	Palomar	NEAT	·	2.6 km	MPC · JPL
877366	2010 EO_{127}	—	February 15, 2010	Catalina	CSS	T_{j} (2.96)	2.7 km	MPC · JPL
877367	2010 EJ_{150}	—	March 10, 2010	WISE	WISE	·	2.4 km	MPC · JPL
877368	2010 EB_{152}	—	March 11, 2010	WISE	WISE	·	1.3 km	MPC · JPL
877369	2010 EG_{152}	—	March 11, 2010	WISE	WISE	·	2.0 km	MPC · JPL
877370	2010 EO_{157}	—	November 27, 2009	Mount Lemmon	Mount Lemmon Survey	LIX	2.3 km	MPC · JPL
877371	2010 EB_{176}	—	November 27, 2013	Haleakala	Pan-STARRS 1	·	660 m	MPC · JPL
877372	2010 EX_{188}	—	March 12, 2010	Mount Lemmon	Mount Lemmon Survey	KON	1.6 km	MPC · JPL
877373	2010 EP_{189}	—	September 1, 2013	Haleakala	Pan-STARRS 1	·	1.7 km	MPC · JPL
877374	2010 EU_{189}	—	March 13, 2010	Mount Lemmon	Mount Lemmon Survey	·	1.1 km	MPC · JPL
877375	2010 FD_{11}	—	February 16, 2010	Kitt Peak	Spacewatch	·	1.1 km	MPC · JPL
877376	2010 FA_{17}	—	March 18, 2010	Kitt Peak	Spacewatch	(5)	780 m	MPC · JPL
877377	2010 FZ_{26}	—	March 20, 2010	Kitt Peak	Spacewatch	·	1.9 km	MPC · JPL
877378	2010 FC_{29}	—	March 20, 2010	Vail	Observatory, Jarnac	·	2.6 km	MPC · JPL
877379	2010 FO_{29}	—	March 13, 2010	Kitt Peak	Spacewatch	·	1.6 km	MPC · JPL
877380	2010 FS_{31}	—	November 17, 2009	Mount Lemmon	Mount Lemmon Survey	·	3.9 km	MPC · JPL
877381	2010 FP_{32}	—	March 17, 2010	WISE	WISE	EUP	2.5 km	MPC · JPL
877382	2010 FX_{37}	—	March 19, 2010	WISE	WISE	EUP	3.2 km	MPC · JPL
877383	2010 FN_{39}	—	November 24, 2009	Mount Lemmon	Mount Lemmon Survey	·	1.4 km	MPC · JPL
877384	2010 FP_{44}	—	March 21, 2010	WISE	WISE	·	1.7 km	MPC · JPL
877385	2010 FM_{46}	—	October 14, 2009	Mount Lemmon	Mount Lemmon Survey	T_{j} (2.96) · 3:2	4.1 km	MPC · JPL
877386	2010 FE_{50}	—	December 19, 2009	Kitt Peak	Spacewatch	T_{j} (2.95) · 3:2	4.7 km	MPC · JPL
877387	2010 FG_{52}	—	December 16, 2009	Mount Lemmon	Mount Lemmon Survey	·	2.9 km	MPC · JPL
877388	2010 FZ_{52}	—	December 17, 2009	Kitt Peak	Spacewatch	·	1.8 km	MPC · JPL
877389	2010 FL_{65}	—	January 11, 2010	Mount Lemmon	Mount Lemmon Survey	LIX	1.8 km	MPC · JPL
877390	2010 FC_{73}	—	March 27, 2010	WISE	WISE	·	1.4 km	MPC · JPL
877391	2010 FP_{74}	—	November 23, 2009	Mount Lemmon	Mount Lemmon Survey	·	2.2 km	MPC · JPL
877392	2010 FV_{85}	—	March 13, 2010	Mount Lemmon	Mount Lemmon Survey	·	1.2 km	MPC · JPL
877393	2010 FE_{103}	—	September 25, 2014	Kitt Peak	Spacewatch	·	1.6 km	MPC · JPL
877394	2010 FQ_{105}	—	March 18, 2010	WISE	WISE	·	2.6 km	MPC · JPL
877395	2010 FB_{106}	—	March 18, 2010	WISE	WISE	·	1.9 km	MPC · JPL
877396	2010 FW_{110}	—	January 10, 2010	Mount Lemmon	Mount Lemmon Survey	·	2.4 km	MPC · JPL
877397	2010 FR_{114}	—	March 26, 2010	WISE	WISE	·	1.9 km	MPC · JPL
877398	2010 FU_{115}	—	September 6, 2008	Mount Lemmon	Mount Lemmon Survey	·	1.6 km	MPC · JPL
877399	2010 FR_{126}	—	March 19, 2010	WISE	WISE	·	1.8 km	MPC · JPL
877400	2010 FV_{138}	—	January 21, 2015	Haleakala	Pan-STARRS 1	·	2.1 km	MPC · JPL

== 877401–877500 ==
back to top

Designation			Discovery			Properties		Ref
Permanent	Provisional	Named after	Date	Site	Discoverer(s)	Category	Diam.	Ref
877401	2010 FE_{139}	—	September 19, 2003	Kitt Peak	Spacewatch	T_{j} (2.97)	1.5 km	MPC · JPL
877402	2010 FG_{139}	—	March 25, 2010	Mount Lemmon	Mount Lemmon Survey	·	2.0 km	MPC · JPL
877403	2010 FN_{139}	—	March 17, 2010	Kitt Peak	Spacewatch	·	420 m	MPC · JPL
877404	2010 FV_{140}	—	March 18, 2010	Mount Lemmon	Mount Lemmon Survey	·	910 m	MPC · JPL
877405	2010 FG_{141}	—	March 19, 2010	Mount Lemmon	Mount Lemmon Survey	·	1.3 km	MPC · JPL
877406	2010 FO_{141}	—	February 25, 2014	Kitt Peak	Spacewatch	·	730 m	MPC · JPL
877407	2010 FH_{144}	—	March 19, 2010	Kitt Peak	Spacewatch	H	410 m	MPC · JPL
877408	2010 FY_{145}	—	March 20, 2010	Kitt Peak	Spacewatch	·	1.3 km	MPC · JPL
877409	2010 GL_{10}	—	December 18, 2009	Mount Lemmon	Mount Lemmon Survey	·	2.6 km	MPC · JPL
877410	2010 GC_{15}	—	December 6, 2005	Kitt Peak	Spacewatch	·	1.7 km	MPC · JPL
877411	2010 GH_{22}	—	November 29, 2003	Kitt Peak	Spacewatch	LIX	2.0 km	MPC · JPL
877412	2010 GA_{26}	—	April 4, 2010	Kitt Peak	Spacewatch	·	1.1 km	MPC · JPL
877413	2010 GO_{33}	—	April 11, 2010	Catalina	CSS	APO	310 m	MPC · JPL
877414	2010 GL_{37}	—	November 16, 2009	Mount Lemmon	Mount Lemmon Survey	EUP	3.1 km	MPC · JPL
877415	2010 GL_{38}	—	January 6, 2010	Mount Lemmon	Mount Lemmon Survey	LIX	3.2 km	MPC · JPL
877416	2010 GT_{41}	—	April 7, 2010	WISE	WISE	EUP	2.7 km	MPC · JPL
877417	2010 GE_{49}	—	January 22, 2015	Haleakala	Pan-STARRS 1	·	1.1 km	MPC · JPL
877418	2010 GJ_{51}	—	April 9, 2010	WISE	WISE	·	2.2 km	MPC · JPL
877419	2010 GO_{55}	—	October 1, 2008	Mount Lemmon	Mount Lemmon Survey	·	3.0 km	MPC · JPL
877420	2010 GO_{61}	—	January 8, 2010	Mount Lemmon	Mount Lemmon Survey	·	2.5 km	MPC · JPL
877421	2010 GK_{68}	—	April 11, 2010	WISE	WISE	·	1.0 km	MPC · JPL
877422	2010 GQ_{73}	—	December 17, 2009	Catalina	CSS	·	2.3 km	MPC · JPL
877423	2010 GE_{89}	—	December 18, 2009	Kitt Peak	Spacewatch	·	800 m	MPC · JPL
877424	2010 GJ_{93}	—	October 23, 2003	Sacramento Peak	SDSS	·	5.1 km	MPC · JPL
877425	2010 GO_{93}	—	April 14, 2010	WISE	WISE	(194)	1.1 km	MPC · JPL
877426	2010 GK_{98}	—	March 20, 2010	Kitt Peak	Spacewatch	critical	620 m	MPC · JPL
877427	2010 GB_{121}	—	April 11, 2010	Mount Lemmon	Mount Lemmon Survey	THM	1.7 km	MPC · JPL
877428	2010 GE_{122}	—	March 19, 2010	Kitt Peak	Spacewatch	·	890 m	MPC · JPL
877429	2010 GB_{131}	—	February 28, 2014	Haleakala	Pan-STARRS 1	·	710 m	MPC · JPL
877430	2010 GA_{145}	—	April 11, 2010	WISE	WISE	·	2.6 km	MPC · JPL
877431	2010 GX_{152}	—	January 9, 2010	Catalina	CSS	EUP	3.1 km	MPC · JPL
877432	2010 GS_{165}	—	April 15, 2010	WISE	WISE	·	2.4 km	MPC · JPL
877433	2010 GD_{167}	—	December 17, 2009	Kitt Peak	Spacewatch	·	2.1 km	MPC · JPL
877434	2010 GN_{167}	—	January 14, 2010	Mount Lemmon	Mount Lemmon Survey	LIX	2.7 km	MPC · JPL
877435	2010 GF_{168}	—	December 18, 2009	Mount Lemmon	Mount Lemmon Survey	·	1.8 km	MPC · JPL
877436	2010 GZ_{192}	—	April 20, 2015	Haleakala	Pan-STARRS 1	·	1.2 km	MPC · JPL
877437	2010 GZ_{200}	—	April 7, 2010	Kitt Peak	Spacewatch	·	780 m	MPC · JPL
877438	2010 GT_{203}	—	October 12, 2013	Mount Lemmon	Mount Lemmon Survey	(895)	2.3 km	MPC · JPL
877439	2010 GE_{204}	—	April 8, 2010	Kitt Peak	Spacewatch	·	1.4 km	MPC · JPL
877440	2010 GF_{207}	—	April 10, 2010	Mount Lemmon	Mount Lemmon Survey	AEO	780 m	MPC · JPL
877441	2010 HO_{12}	—	November 26, 2009	Mount Lemmon	Mount Lemmon Survey	T_{j} (2.98)	2.5 km	MPC · JPL
877442	2010 HB_{21}	—	April 20, 2010	Mount Lemmon	Mount Lemmon Survey	·	1.5 km	MPC · JPL
877443	2010 HF_{22}	—	April 18, 2010	WISE	WISE	·	810 m	MPC · JPL
877444	2010 HH_{27}	—	April 19, 2010	WISE	WISE	·	1.6 km	MPC · JPL
877445	2010 HK_{48}	—	January 10, 2010	Kitt Peak	Spacewatch	·	2.6 km	MPC · JPL
877446	2010 HW_{55}	—	January 7, 2010	Kitt Peak	Spacewatch	·	2.5 km	MPC · JPL
877447	2010 HJ_{62}	—	April 26, 2001	Anderson Mesa	LONEOS	·	1.1 km	MPC · JPL
877448	2010 HO_{70}	—	April 27, 2010	WISE	WISE	DOR	2.0 km	MPC · JPL
877449	2010 HQ_{76}	—	February 12, 2004	Kitt Peak	Spacewatch	·	1.6 km	MPC · JPL
877450	2010 HV_{85}	—	January 8, 2016	Haleakala	Pan-STARRS 1	·	2.4 km	MPC · JPL
877451	2010 HC_{90}	—	April 29, 2010	WISE	WISE	·	2.7 km	MPC · JPL
877452	2010 HU_{97}	—	April 30, 2010	WISE	WISE	LIX	2.3 km	MPC · JPL
877453	2010 HJ_{99}	—	January 1, 2009	Mount Lemmon	Mount Lemmon Survey	T_{j} (2.95)	2.4 km	MPC · JPL
877454	2010 HM_{100}	—	February 15, 2010	Mount Lemmon	Mount Lemmon Survey	·	2.4 km	MPC · JPL
877455	2010 HU_{106}	—	April 25, 2010	Kitt Peak	Spacewatch	·	1.8 km	MPC · JPL
877456	2010 HN_{128}	—	March 3, 2016	Haleakala	Pan-STARRS 1	·	1.7 km	MPC · JPL
877457	2010 HH_{132}	—	April 26, 2010	WISE	WISE	T_{j} (2.99)	3.0 km	MPC · JPL
877458	2010 JF	—	May 4, 2010	Catalina	CSS	AMO	500 m	MPC · JPL
877459	2010 JG_{4}	—	February 16, 2010	Mount Lemmon	Mount Lemmon Survey	·	1.9 km	MPC · JPL
877460	2010 JV_{7}	—	May 1, 2010	WISE	WISE	·	1.7 km	MPC · JPL
877461	2010 JB_{16}	—	May 2, 2010	WISE	WISE	·	2.6 km	MPC · JPL
877462	2010 JG_{19}	—	May 3, 2010	WISE	WISE	KON	2.3 km	MPC · JPL
877463	2010 JM_{20}	—	May 3, 2010	WISE	WISE	·	1.8 km	MPC · JPL
877464	2010 JJ_{25}	—	May 4, 2010	WISE	WISE	·	3.1 km	MPC · JPL
877465	2010 JP_{30}	—	May 3, 2010	Kitt Peak	Spacewatch	·	1.1 km	MPC · JPL
877466	2010 JB_{32}	—	May 6, 2010	Mount Lemmon	Mount Lemmon Survey	·	620 m	MPC · JPL
877467	2010 JY_{47}	—	May 4, 2010	Kitt Peak	Spacewatch	H	450 m	MPC · JPL
877468	2010 JS_{50}	—	February 18, 2010	Kitt Peak	Spacewatch	·	2.5 km	MPC · JPL
877469	2010 JE_{69}	—	May 9, 2010	WISE	WISE	LUT	2.2 km	MPC · JPL
877470	2010 JY_{72}	—	May 6, 2010	Kitt Peak	Spacewatch	·	2.6 km	MPC · JPL
877471	2010 JH_{81}	—	May 11, 2010	WISE	WISE	·	3.6 km	MPC · JPL
877472	2010 JL_{82}	—	May 11, 2010	Mount Lemmon	Mount Lemmon Survey	·	890 m	MPC · JPL
877473	2010 JU_{88}	—	October 24, 2008	Kitt Peak	Spacewatch	·	2.5 km	MPC · JPL
877474	2010 JQ_{90}	—	November 18, 2003	Palomar	NEAT	T_{j} (2.94)	4.2 km	MPC · JPL
877475	2010 JM_{93}	—	May 10, 2010	WISE	WISE	·	1.6 km	MPC · JPL
877476	2010 JE_{94}	—	February 16, 2010	Catalina	CSS	·	2.5 km	MPC · JPL
877477	2010 JO_{105}	—	May 12, 2010	WISE	WISE	·	2.0 km	MPC · JPL
877478	2010 JB_{106}	—	April 5, 2010	Mount Lemmon	Mount Lemmon Survey	·	1.8 km	MPC · JPL
877479	2010 JJ_{127}	—	May 13, 2010	WISE	WISE	·	1.5 km	MPC · JPL
877480	2010 JP_{143}	—	May 8, 2010	Mount Lemmon	Mount Lemmon Survey	·	2.8 km	MPC · JPL
877481	2010 JM_{152}	—	May 7, 2010	Mount Lemmon	Mount Lemmon Survey	PHO	750 m	MPC · JPL
877482	2010 JU_{160}	—	January 3, 2014	Mount Lemmon	Mount Lemmon Survey	·	1.1 km	MPC · JPL
877483	2010 JV_{187}	—	March 29, 2016	Cerro Tololo-DECam	DECam	·	2.0 km	MPC · JPL
877484	2010 JN_{192}	—	May 8, 2010	WISE	WISE	·	990 m	MPC · JPL
877485	2010 JJ_{211}	—	May 4, 2010	Kitt Peak	Spacewatch	·	920 m	MPC · JPL
877486	2010 JA_{214}	—	May 5, 2010	Mount Lemmon	Mount Lemmon Survey	·	1.2 km	MPC · JPL
877487	2010 KW_{2}	—	May 16, 2010	WISE	WISE	VER	2.2 km	MPC · JPL
877488	2010 KC_{3}	—	May 16, 2010	WISE	WISE	·	1.5 km	MPC · JPL
877489	2010 KO_{7}	—	November 4, 2014	Mount Lemmon	Mount Lemmon Survey	EUP	2.9 km	MPC · JPL
877490	2010 KO_{11}	—	May 18, 2010	WISE	WISE	T_{j} (2.97)	3.6 km	MPC · JPL
877491	2010 KS_{11}	—	May 18, 2010	WISE	WISE	EUP	5.4 km	MPC · JPL
877492	2010 KH_{21}	—	May 5, 2006	Anderson Mesa	LONEOS	PHO	2.0 km	MPC · JPL
877493	2010 KQ_{21}	—	May 17, 2010	WISE	WISE	THB	2.0 km	MPC · JPL
877494	2010 KQ_{25}	—	October 29, 2008	Kitt Peak	Spacewatch	EUP	3.0 km	MPC · JPL
877495	2010 KB_{28}	—	May 18, 2010	WISE	WISE	·	1.8 km	MPC · JPL
877496	2010 KF_{34}	—	May 19, 2010	WISE	WISE	LIX	2.3 km	MPC · JPL
877497	2010 KZ_{37}	—	May 4, 2010	Kitt Peak	Spacewatch	·	1.2 km	MPC · JPL
877498	2010 KS_{56}	—	August 19, 2001	Cerro Tololo	Deep Ecliptic Survey	·	2.8 km	MPC · JPL
877499	2010 KS_{86}	—	January 12, 2010	Mount Lemmon	Mount Lemmon Survey	EUP	4.0 km	MPC · JPL
877500	2010 KG_{91}	—	March 12, 2010	Mount Lemmon	Mount Lemmon Survey	·	2.3 km	MPC · JPL

== 877501–877600 ==
back to top

Designation			Discovery			Properties		Ref
Permanent	Provisional	Named after	Date	Site	Discoverer(s)	Category	Diam.	Ref
877501	2010 KT_{114}	—	May 30, 2010	WISE	WISE	·	740 m	MPC · JPL
877502	2010 KZ_{125}	—	March 20, 2010	Mount Lemmon	Mount Lemmon Survey	EUP	3.2 km	MPC · JPL
877503	2010 KM_{135}	—	May 17, 2010	WISE	WISE	critical	1.7 km	MPC · JPL
877504	2010 KV_{140}	—	February 18, 2010	Kitt Peak	Spacewatch	·	640 m	MPC · JPL
877505	2010 KG_{142}	—	July 25, 2017	Haleakala	Pan-STARRS 1	EUP	2.9 km	MPC · JPL
877506	2010 KA_{143}	—	March 6, 2009	Siding Spring	SSS	T_{j} (2.97)	2.3 km	MPC · JPL
877507	2010 LK_{15}	—	November 21, 2009	Mount Lemmon	Mount Lemmon Survey	·	980 m	MPC · JPL
877508	2010 LP_{32}	—	April 9, 2010	Catalina	CSS	THB	3.3 km	MPC · JPL
877509	2010 LW_{37}	—	June 6, 2010	WISE	WISE	·	1.7 km	MPC · JPL
877510	2010 LC_{38}	—	June 6, 2010	WISE	WISE	·	810 m	MPC · JPL
877511	2010 LQ_{39}	—	June 7, 2010	WISE	WISE	·	2.2 km	MPC · JPL
877512	2010 LB_{40}	—	June 7, 2010	WISE	WISE	·	2.1 km	MPC · JPL
877513	2010 LG_{46}	—	June 8, 2010	WISE	WISE	·	2.3 km	MPC · JPL
877514	2010 LR_{53}	—	June 8, 2010	WISE	WISE	·	1.3 km	MPC · JPL
877515	2010 LD_{55}	—	March 16, 2010	Mount Lemmon	Mount Lemmon Survey	·	2.3 km	MPC · JPL
877516	2010 LB_{71}	—	June 10, 2010	WISE	WISE	T_{j} (2.81)	3.3 km	MPC · JPL
877517	2010 LQ_{72}	—	May 17, 2009	Mount Lemmon	Mount Lemmon Survey	LIX	2.3 km	MPC · JPL
877518	2010 LB_{77}	—	February 17, 2010	Mount Lemmon	Mount Lemmon Survey	·	2.4 km	MPC · JPL
877519	2010 LF_{78}	—	June 10, 2010	WISE	WISE	·	930 m	MPC · JPL
877520	2010 LE_{88}	—	June 12, 2010	WISE	WISE	·	2.4 km	MPC · JPL
877521	2010 LY_{89}	—	June 12, 2010	WISE	WISE	·	2.2 km	MPC · JPL
877522	2010 LV_{115}	—	June 13, 2010	WISE	WISE	·	2.9 km	MPC · JPL
877523	2010 LS_{116}	—	June 14, 2010	WISE	WISE	·	1.0 km	MPC · JPL
877524	2010 LC_{126}	—	June 15, 2010	WISE	WISE	·	1.7 km	MPC · JPL
877525	2010 LC_{139}	—	December 9, 2017	Kitt Peak	Spacewatch	·	1.1 km	MPC · JPL
877526	2010 LE_{139}	—	June 3, 2010	WISE	WISE	T_{j} (2.98)	2.4 km	MPC · JPL
877527	2010 LO_{158}	—	June 13, 2010	Mount Lemmon	Mount Lemmon Survey	·	680 m	MPC · JPL
877528	2010 MY_{4}	—	June 17, 2010	Kitt Peak	Spacewatch	·	870 m	MPC · JPL
877529	2010 MQ_{9}	—	June 16, 2010	WISE	WISE	·	1.6 km	MPC · JPL
877530	2010 MD_{12}	—	June 17, 2010	WISE	WISE	·	1.1 km	MPC · JPL
877531	2010 ML_{18}	—	April 5, 2010	Catalina	CSS	T_{j} (2.94)	2.3 km	MPC · JPL
877532	2010 MN_{20}	—	August 31, 2005	Palomar	NEAT	·	2.0 km	MPC · JPL
877533	2010 MA_{31}	—	June 20, 2010	WISE	WISE	T_{j} (2.98) · EUP	2.3 km	MPC · JPL
877534	2010 MD_{45}	—	March 9, 2008	Mount Lemmon	Mount Lemmon Survey	·	3.5 km	MPC · JPL
877535	2010 MN_{55}	—	March 4, 2016	Haleakala	Pan-STARRS 1	·	2.1 km	MPC · JPL
877536	2010 MB_{63}	—	May 11, 2010	Mount Lemmon	Mount Lemmon Survey	·	770 m	MPC · JPL
877537	2010 MO_{64}	—	June 24, 2010	WISE	WISE	T_{j} (2.98) · EUP	2.4 km	MPC · JPL
877538	2010 MY_{86}	—	December 12, 2001	Palomar	NEAT	·	2.2 km	MPC · JPL
877539	2010 MA_{93}	—	June 28, 2010	WISE	WISE	THB	2.6 km	MPC · JPL
877540	2010 MR_{127}	—	May 8, 2014	Haleakala	Pan-STARRS 1	·	1.2 km	MPC · JPL
877541	2010 MR_{136}	—	October 10, 2010	Mount Lemmon	Mount Lemmon Survey	·	2.1 km	MPC · JPL
877542	2010 MG_{140}	—	June 28, 2010	WISE	WISE	·	1.7 km	MPC · JPL
877543	2010 NP	—	July 1, 2010	WISE	WISE	·	2.8 km	MPC · JPL
877544	2010 NE_{11}	—	July 5, 2010	WISE	WISE	·	3.0 km	MPC · JPL
877545	2010 NE_{12}	—	July 5, 2010	WISE	WISE	·	2.3 km	MPC · JPL
877546	2010 NR_{72}	—	July 14, 2010	WISE	WISE	·	1.7 km	MPC · JPL
877547	2010 NU_{83}	—	May 30, 2006	Socorro	LINEAR	·	860 m	MPC · JPL
877548	2010 NZ_{84}	—	July 1, 2010	WISE	WISE	(32418)	2.0 km	MPC · JPL
877549	2010 ND_{88}	—	March 13, 2010	Kitt Peak	Spacewatch	LIX	1.9 km	MPC · JPL
877550	2010 OP_{13}	—	July 17, 2010	WISE	WISE	·	1.4 km	MPC · JPL
877551	2010 OE_{41}	—	September 8, 2005	Siding Spring	SSS	(32418)	1.4 km	MPC · JPL
877552	2010 OB_{64}	—	April 9, 2010	Kitt Peak	Spacewatch	·	2.3 km	MPC · JPL
877553	2010 OK_{68}	—	July 25, 2010	WISE	WISE	·	1.3 km	MPC · JPL
877554	2010 OV_{68}	—	February 14, 2004	Palomar	NEAT	·	5.2 km	MPC · JPL
877555	2010 OM_{72}	—	July 5, 2005	Mount Lemmon	Mount Lemmon Survey	·	1.7 km	MPC · JPL
877556	2010 OA_{103}	—	November 7, 2007	Kitt Peak	Spacewatch	·	560 m	MPC · JPL
877557	2010 OG_{153}	—	July 17, 2010	Siding Spring	SSS	·	1.2 km	MPC · JPL
877558	2010 PT_{22}	—	June 10, 2010	Mount Lemmon	Mount Lemmon Survey	·	1.4 km	MPC · JPL
877559	2010 PB_{27}	—	June 15, 2010	Siding Spring	SSS	·	670 m	MPC · JPL
877560	2010 PC_{45}	—	August 6, 2010	WISE	WISE	NAE	3.1 km	MPC · JPL
877561	2010 PM_{53}	—	May 11, 2010	Mount Lemmon	Mount Lemmon Survey	·	1.9 km	MPC · JPL
877562	2010 PG_{60}	—	October 4, 2002	Sacramento Peak	SDSS	·	1.2 km	MPC · JPL
877563	2010 PA_{77}	—	August 12, 2010	Kitt Peak	Spacewatch	·	680 m	MPC · JPL
877564	2010 PG_{86}	—	October 31, 2010	ESA OGS	ESA OGS	·	1.2 km	MPC · JPL
877565	2010 PQ_{88}	—	August 12, 2010	Kitt Peak	Spacewatch	615	1.0 km	MPC · JPL
877566	2010 PC_{91}	—	August 13, 2010	Kitt Peak	Spacewatch	·	1.5 km	MPC · JPL
877567	2010 PF_{91}	—	August 12, 2010	Kitt Peak	Spacewatch	KOR	1.1 km	MPC · JPL
877568	2010 QP_{2}	—	August 30, 2010	Farra d'Isonzo	Osservatorio Astronomico di Farra d'Isonzo	NYS	750 m	MPC · JPL
877569	2010 RP_{2}	—	September 1, 2010	Socorro	LINEAR	·	450 m	MPC · JPL
877570	2010 RB_{6}	—	September 2, 2010	Mount Lemmon	Mount Lemmon Survey	·	1.2 km	MPC · JPL
877571	2010 RU_{6}	—	September 2, 2010	Mount Lemmon	Mount Lemmon Survey	·	1.3 km	MPC · JPL
877572	2010 RR_{11}	—	September 2, 2010	Piszkés-tető	K. Sárneczky, Z. Kuli	TIN	730 m	MPC · JPL
877573	2010 RU_{17}	—	September 2, 2010	Socorro	LINEAR	H	430 m	MPC · JPL
877574	2010 RA_{23}	—	September 3, 2010	Mount Lemmon	Mount Lemmon Survey	·	980 m	MPC · JPL
877575	2010 RH_{26}	—	September 15, 2006	Kitt Peak	Spacewatch	(5)	850 m	MPC · JPL
877576	2010 RQ_{42}	—	August 20, 2010	XuYi	PMO NEO Survey Program	·	1.0 km	MPC · JPL
877577	2010 RA_{49}	—	September 4, 2010	Kitt Peak	Spacewatch	·	820 m	MPC · JPL
877578	2010 RR_{49}	—	September 4, 2010	Kitt Peak	Spacewatch	·	1.0 km	MPC · JPL
877579	2010 RW_{52}	—	September 2, 2010	Mount Lemmon	Mount Lemmon Survey	·	1.0 km	MPC · JPL
877580	2010 RD_{56}	—	September 5, 2010	Mount Lemmon	Mount Lemmon Survey	·	1.4 km	MPC · JPL
877581	2010 RE_{71}	—	September 2, 2010	Mount Lemmon	Mount Lemmon Survey	·	1.0 km	MPC · JPL
877582	2010 RU_{77}	—	September 6, 2010	La Sagra	OAM	·	940 m	MPC · JPL
877583	2010 RN_{83}	—	August 12, 2010	Kitt Peak	Spacewatch	KOR	1.0 km	MPC · JPL
877584	2010 RT_{91}	—	September 10, 2010	Kitt Peak	Spacewatch	·	1.6 km	MPC · JPL
877585	2010 RU_{91}	—	October 27, 2003	Kitt Peak	Spacewatch	·	700 m	MPC · JPL
877586	2010 RS_{97}	—	September 10, 2010	Kitt Peak	Spacewatch	·	810 m	MPC · JPL
877587	2010 RP_{109}	—	September 12, 2010	ESA OGS	ESA OGS	·	740 m	MPC · JPL
877588	2010 RV_{112}	—	September 11, 2010	Kitt Peak	Spacewatch	·	1.2 km	MPC · JPL
877589	2010 RV_{114}	—	September 11, 2010	Kitt Peak	Spacewatch	·	790 m	MPC · JPL
877590	2010 RN_{122}	—	September 15, 2010	Mount Lemmon	Mount Lemmon Survey	·	870 m	MPC · JPL
877591	2010 RP_{126}	—	September 12, 2010	Kitt Peak	Spacewatch	·	750 m	MPC · JPL
877592	2010 RC_{139}	—	September 11, 2010	Mount Lemmon	Mount Lemmon Survey	MAS	590 m	MPC · JPL
877593	2010 RO_{139}	—	September 11, 2010	Catalina	CSS	·	710 m	MPC · JPL
877594	2010 RC_{143}	—	August 28, 2005	Kitt Peak	Spacewatch	·	1.5 km	MPC · JPL
877595	2010 RN_{143}	—	September 14, 2010	Kitt Peak	Spacewatch	·	1.2 km	MPC · JPL
877596	2010 RO_{164}	—	September 6, 2010	Piszkés-tető	K. Sárneczky, Z. Kuli	MAS	400 m	MPC · JPL
877597	2010 RS_{169}	—	September 2, 2010	Mount Lemmon	Mount Lemmon Survey	·	1.2 km	MPC · JPL
877598	2010 RY_{185}	—	May 27, 2017	Haleakala	Pan-STARRS 1	NYS	880 m	MPC · JPL
877599	2010 RV_{196}	—	September 11, 2010	Mount Lemmon	Mount Lemmon Survey	MAS	570 m	MPC · JPL
877600	2010 RP_{203}	—	September 4, 2010	Kitt Peak	Spacewatch	·	1.5 km	MPC · JPL

== 877601–877700 ==
back to top

Designation			Discovery			Properties		Ref
Permanent	Provisional	Named after	Date	Site	Discoverer(s)	Category	Diam.	Ref
877601	2010 RK_{204}	—	August 13, 2010	Kitt Peak	Spacewatch	·	890 m	MPC · JPL
877602	2010 RO_{211}	—	September 3, 2010	Mount Lemmon	Mount Lemmon Survey	·	1.2 km	MPC · JPL
877603	2010 RL_{217}	—	September 14, 2010	Kitt Peak	Spacewatch	NYS	630 m	MPC · JPL
877604	2010 SC_{7}	—	September 1, 2010	Mount Lemmon	Mount Lemmon Survey	MAS	470 m	MPC · JPL
877605	2010 SM_{9}	—	September 17, 2010	Mount Lemmon	Mount Lemmon Survey	·	990 m	MPC · JPL
877606	2010 SS_{14}	—	September 29, 2010	Mount Lemmon	Mount Lemmon Survey	·	890 m	MPC · JPL
877607	2010 SK_{16}	—	November 25, 2006	Mount Lemmon	Mount Lemmon Survey	·	990 m	MPC · JPL
877608	2010 SM_{21}	—	September 10, 2010	Kitt Peak	Spacewatch	·	910 m	MPC · JPL
877609	2010 SX_{23}	—	September 18, 2010	Mount Lemmon	Mount Lemmon Survey	MAS	530 m	MPC · JPL
877610	2010 SX_{27}	—	September 29, 2010	Kitt Peak	Spacewatch	MAS	510 m	MPC · JPL
877611	2010 SA_{28}	—	September 29, 2010	Kitt Peak	Spacewatch	·	750 m	MPC · JPL
877612	2010 SS_{36}	—	September 7, 2010	Piszkés-tető	K. Sárneczky, Z. Kuli	·	630 m	MPC · JPL
877613	2010 SF_{41}	—	September 29, 2010	Mount Lemmon	Mount Lemmon Survey	·	660 m	MPC · JPL
877614	2010 SL_{41}	—	September 17, 2010	Kitt Peak	Spacewatch	·	1.5 km	MPC · JPL
877615	2010 SM_{44}	—	September 16, 2010	Mount Lemmon	Mount Lemmon Survey	·	1.5 km	MPC · JPL
877616	2010 SC_{53}	—	September 19, 2010	Kitt Peak	Spacewatch	·	1.3 km	MPC · JPL
877617	2010 SN_{53}	—	September 18, 2010	Andrushivka	Kyrylenko, P., Y. Ivaščenko	·	1.7 km	MPC · JPL
877618	2010 SZ_{56}	—	September 29, 2010	Mount Lemmon	Mount Lemmon Survey	KOR	1.1 km	MPC · JPL
877619	2010 SB_{57}	—	September 18, 2010	Mount Lemmon	Mount Lemmon Survey	·	1.7 km	MPC · JPL
877620	2010 SX_{65}	—	August 28, 2006	Catalina	CSS	·	790 m	MPC · JPL
877621	2010 TF_{5}	—	October 1, 2010	Kitt Peak	Spacewatch	·	820 m	MPC · JPL
877622	2010 TW_{8}	—	September 11, 2010	Kitt Peak	Spacewatch	·	1.6 km	MPC · JPL
877623	2010 TE_{32}	—	September 18, 2010	Kitt Peak	Spacewatch	·	1.0 km	MPC · JPL
877624	2010 TA_{33}	—	September 14, 2010	Kitt Peak	Spacewatch	·	650 m	MPC · JPL
877625	2010 TP_{35}	—	October 2, 2010	Kitt Peak	Spacewatch	MAS	560 m	MPC · JPL
877626	2010 TS_{41}	—	September 16, 2010	Kitt Peak	Spacewatch	NYS	890 m	MPC · JPL
877627	2010 TS_{52}	—	October 8, 2010	Kitt Peak	Spacewatch	H	330 m	MPC · JPL
877628	2010 TY_{66}	—	October 8, 2010	Kitt Peak	Spacewatch	EUN	760 m	MPC · JPL
877629	2010 TV_{70}	—	October 8, 2010	Kitt Peak	Spacewatch	BRA	1.1 km	MPC · JPL
877630	2010 TY_{71}	—	October 8, 2010	Kitt Peak	Spacewatch	KOR	1.1 km	MPC · JPL
877631	2010 TY_{73}	—	October 8, 2010	Kitt Peak	Spacewatch	·	1.2 km	MPC · JPL
877632	2010 TR_{86}	—	September 16, 2010	Kitt Peak	Spacewatch	KOR	1.0 km	MPC · JPL
877633	2010 TS_{95}	—	September 29, 2010	Mount Lemmon	Mount Lemmon Survey	KOR	930 m	MPC · JPL
877634	2010 TY_{95}	—	September 29, 2005	Mount Lemmon	Mount Lemmon Survey	·	1.3 km	MPC · JPL
877635	2010 TJ_{101}	—	October 9, 2010	Mount Lemmon	Mount Lemmon Survey	·	1.3 km	MPC · JPL
877636	2010 TR_{104}	—	October 9, 2010	Kitt Peak	Spacewatch	TIR	1.9 km	MPC · JPL
877637	2010 TH_{107}	—	October 1, 2005	Mount Lemmon	Mount Lemmon Survey	·	1.2 km	MPC · JPL
877638	2010 TL_{108}	—	September 4, 2010	Kitt Peak	Spacewatch	·	770 m	MPC · JPL
877639	2010 TY_{110}	—	September 14, 2010	Kitt Peak	Spacewatch	·	1.3 km	MPC · JPL
877640	2010 TK_{116}	—	August 31, 2005	Kitt Peak	Spacewatch	·	1.5 km	MPC · JPL
877641	2010 TL_{128}	—	September 11, 2010	Kitt Peak	Spacewatch	·	1.3 km	MPC · JPL
877642	2010 TT_{136}	—	October 18, 2001	Palomar	NEAT	·	2.3 km	MPC · JPL
877643	2010 TY_{140}	—	September 16, 2010	Mount Lemmon	Mount Lemmon Survey	·	700 m	MPC · JPL
877644	2010 TC_{156}	—	October 10, 2010	Kitt Peak	Spacewatch	·	1.6 km	MPC · JPL
877645	2010 TY_{164}	—	September 18, 2010	Mount Lemmon	Mount Lemmon Survey	·	940 m	MPC · JPL
877646	2010 TJ_{185}	—	October 11, 2010	Palomar	Palomar Transient Factory	critical	1.3 km	MPC · JPL
877647	2010 TJ_{187}	—	October 11, 2010	Mount Lemmon	Mount Lemmon Survey	·	1.3 km	MPC · JPL
877648	2010 TB_{193}	—	October 31, 2005	Mount Lemmon	Mount Lemmon Survey	·	1.5 km	MPC · JPL
877649	2010 TA_{198}	—	October 1, 2010	Kitt Peak	Spacewatch	·	1.2 km	MPC · JPL
877650	2010 TB_{202}	—	October 12, 2010	Mount Lemmon	Mount Lemmon Survey	·	1.3 km	MPC · JPL
877651	2010 TO_{202}	—	October 14, 2010	Mount Lemmon	Mount Lemmon Survey	·	1.4 km	MPC · JPL
877652	2010 TZ_{206}	—	October 12, 2010	Mount Lemmon	Mount Lemmon Survey	MAS	490 m	MPC · JPL
877653	2010 TC_{207}	—	October 9, 2010	Mount Lemmon	Mount Lemmon Survey	·	1.3 km	MPC · JPL
877654	2010 TE_{209}	—	October 12, 2010	Mount Lemmon	Mount Lemmon Survey	·	1.2 km	MPC · JPL
877655	2010 TM_{209}	—	October 10, 2010	Mount Lemmon	Mount Lemmon Survey	H	310 m	MPC · JPL
877656	2010 TW_{210}	—	October 13, 2010	Mount Lemmon	Mount Lemmon Survey	·	1.1 km	MPC · JPL
877657	2010 TR_{212}	—	October 13, 2010	Kitt Peak	Spacewatch	·	1.2 km	MPC · JPL
877658	2010 TR_{217}	—	October 13, 2010	Mount Lemmon	Mount Lemmon Survey	·	1.2 km	MPC · JPL
877659	2010 TT_{219}	—	October 13, 2010	Mount Lemmon	Mount Lemmon Survey	EOS	1.2 km	MPC · JPL
877660	2010 TH_{220}	—	October 12, 2010	Mount Lemmon	Mount Lemmon Survey	·	840 m	MPC · JPL
877661	2010 TA_{223}	—	October 11, 2010	Kitt Peak	Spacewatch	·	930 m	MPC · JPL
877662	2010 TH_{229}	—	December 28, 2003	Kitt Peak	Spacewatch	NYS	790 m	MPC · JPL
877663	2010 TO_{236}	—	October 13, 2010	Catalina	CSS	JUN	660 m	MPC · JPL
877664	2010 UM_{10}	—	July 19, 2010	WISE	WISE	·	890 m	MPC · JPL
877665	2010 UO_{32}	—	October 29, 2010	Mount Lemmon	Mount Lemmon Survey	critical	1.6 km	MPC · JPL
877666	2010 UL_{35}	—	September 15, 2010	Kitt Peak	Spacewatch	·	690 m	MPC · JPL
877667	2010 UB_{57}	—	October 12, 2010	Mount Lemmon	Mount Lemmon Survey	·	750 m	MPC · JPL
877668	2010 UT_{71}	—	March 28, 2009	Kitt Peak	Spacewatch	H	330 m	MPC · JPL
877669	2010 UF_{72}	—	October 29, 2010	Mount Lemmon	Mount Lemmon Survey	·	1.2 km	MPC · JPL
877670	2010 UX_{75}	—	October 13, 2010	Mount Lemmon	Mount Lemmon Survey	critical	1.1 km	MPC · JPL
877671	2010 UO_{78}	—	October 30, 2010	Mount Lemmon	Mount Lemmon Survey	T_{j} (2.95)	2.9 km	MPC · JPL
877672	2010 UX_{79}	—	October 30, 2010	Mount Lemmon	Mount Lemmon Survey	·	1.5 km	MPC · JPL
877673	2010 UA_{82}	—	October 22, 2003	Mauna Kea	Gwyn, S.	·	450 m	MPC · JPL
877674	2010 UE_{83}	—	October 29, 2010	Kitt Peak	Spacewatch	·	1 km	MPC · JPL
877675	2010 US_{85}	—	October 19, 2010	Mount Lemmon	Mount Lemmon Survey	·	800 m	MPC · JPL
877676	2010 UV_{102}	—	November 3, 2010	Mount Lemmon	Mount Lemmon Survey	MAS	590 m	MPC · JPL
877677	2010 UK_{109}	—	October 19, 2010	Mount Lemmon	Mount Lemmon Survey	·	2.7 km	MPC · JPL
877678	2010 UK_{119}	—	October 28, 2010	Mount Lemmon	Mount Lemmon Survey	·	960 m	MPC · JPL
877679	2010 UU_{120}	—	October 17, 2010	Mayhill-ISON	L. Elenin	·	1.0 km	MPC · JPL
877680	2010 UC_{129}	—	October 17, 2010	Mount Lemmon	Mount Lemmon Survey	·	830 m	MPC · JPL
877681	2010 UQ_{131}	—	October 17, 2010	Mount Lemmon	Mount Lemmon Survey	·	680 m	MPC · JPL
877682	2010 VR_{35}	—	September 28, 2003	Kitt Peak	Spacewatch	NYS	640 m	MPC · JPL
877683	2010 VH_{48}	—	November 2, 2010	Kitt Peak	Spacewatch	·	820 m	MPC · JPL
877684	2010 VK_{48}	—	November 2, 2010	Mount Lemmon	Mount Lemmon Survey	·	860 m	MPC · JPL
877685	2010 VD_{72}	—	November 9, 2010	Catalina	CSS	ATE · PHA	120 m	MPC · JPL
877686	2010 VS_{72}	—	October 12, 2010	Mount Lemmon	Mount Lemmon Survey	·	870 m	MPC · JPL
877687	2010 VP_{74}	—	July 21, 2010	WISE	WISE	·	1.5 km	MPC · JPL
877688	2010 VF_{77}	—	September 22, 1992	La Silla	E. W. Elst	·	2.0 km	MPC · JPL
877689	2010 VS_{88}	—	November 6, 2010	Kitt Peak	Spacewatch	·	2.1 km	MPC · JPL
877690	2010 VJ_{113}	—	December 12, 1999	Kitt Peak	Spacewatch	·	810 m	MPC · JPL
877691	2010 VO_{137}	—	October 13, 2010	Mount Lemmon	Mount Lemmon Survey	·	1.1 km	MPC · JPL
877692	2010 VP_{137}	—	September 11, 2010	Mount Lemmon	Mount Lemmon Survey	NYS	800 m	MPC · JPL
877693	2010 VM_{160}	—	October 11, 2010	Mount Lemmon	Mount Lemmon Survey	·	930 m	MPC · JPL
877694	2010 VV_{169}	—	November 10, 2010	Mount Lemmon	Mount Lemmon Survey	·	1.1 km	MPC · JPL
877695	2010 VR_{182}	—	October 31, 2010	Kitt Peak	Spacewatch	·	1.7 km	MPC · JPL
877696	2010 VF_{190}	—	November 13, 2010	Mount Lemmon	Mount Lemmon Survey	·	880 m	MPC · JPL
877697	2010 VF_{195}	—	June 20, 2010	Kitt Peak	Spacewatch	(116763)	1.5 km	MPC · JPL
877698	2010 VK_{196}	—	October 30, 2010	Kitt Peak	Spacewatch	·	1.2 km	MPC · JPL
877699	2010 VC_{197}	—	November 13, 2010	Mount Lemmon	Mount Lemmon Survey	·	880 m	MPC · JPL
877700	2010 VN_{197}	—	November 2, 2010	Kitt Peak	Spacewatch	·	860 m	MPC · JPL

== 877701–877800 ==
back to top

Designation			Discovery			Properties		Ref
Permanent	Provisional	Named after	Date	Site	Discoverer(s)	Category	Diam.	Ref
877701	2010 VP_{204}	—	September 17, 2010	Mount Lemmon	Mount Lemmon Survey	·	1.0 km	MPC · JPL
877702	2010 VX_{230}	—	November 6, 2010	Catalina	CSS	critical	560 m	MPC · JPL
877703	2010 VP_{232}	—	November 1, 2010	Mount Lemmon	Mount Lemmon Survey	·	560 m	MPC · JPL
877704	2010 VR_{233}	—	November 4, 2010	Mount Lemmon	Mount Lemmon Survey	RAF	570 m	MPC · JPL
877705	2010 VF_{235}	—	November 1, 2010	Mount Lemmon	Mount Lemmon Survey	·	540 m	MPC · JPL
877706	2010 VF_{238}	—	November 15, 2010	Mount Lemmon	Mount Lemmon Survey	·	1.2 km	MPC · JPL
877707	2010 VC_{242}	—	November 11, 2010	Mount Lemmon	Mount Lemmon Survey	MAS	480 m	MPC · JPL
877708	2010 VG_{246}	—	November 8, 2010	Kitt Peak	Spacewatch	JUN	620 m	MPC · JPL
877709	2010 VX_{247}	—	February 5, 2016	Haleakala	Pan-STARRS 1	·	810 m	MPC · JPL
877710	2010 VC_{252}	—	November 8, 2010	Kitt Peak	Spacewatch	·	860 m	MPC · JPL
877711	2010 VY_{252}	—	November 12, 2010	Mount Lemmon	Mount Lemmon Survey	·	980 m	MPC · JPL
877712	2010 VZ_{252}	—	November 2, 2010	Mount Lemmon	Mount Lemmon Survey	·	700 m	MPC · JPL
877713	2010 VO_{282}	—	November 4, 2010	Mount Lemmon	Mount Lemmon Survey	·	710 m	MPC · JPL
877714	2010 VQ_{285}	—	November 13, 2010	Mount Lemmon	Mount Lemmon Survey	·	1.7 km	MPC · JPL
877715	2010 WM_{6}	—	October 28, 2010	Mount Lemmon	Mount Lemmon Survey	MAS	460 m	MPC · JPL
877716	2010 WX_{6}	—	November 27, 2010	Mount Lemmon	Mount Lemmon Survey	·	1.4 km	MPC · JPL
877717	2010 WT_{8}	—	November 27, 2010	Mount Lemmon	Mount Lemmon Survey	APO	140 m	MPC · JPL
877718	2010 WZ_{8}	—	November 29, 2010	Socorro	LINEAR	APO · PHA	250 m	MPC · JPL
877719	2010 WL_{22}	—	November 10, 2010	Mount Lemmon	Mount Lemmon Survey	·	490 m	MPC · JPL
877720	2010 WV_{32}	—	December 4, 2005	Kitt Peak	Spacewatch	·	1.1 km	MPC · JPL
877721	2010 WL_{42}	—	November 27, 2010	Mount Lemmon	Mount Lemmon Survey	L4 · ERY	4.5 km	MPC · JPL
877722	2010 WB_{58}	—	October 14, 2010	Mount Lemmon	Mount Lemmon Survey	·	880 m	MPC · JPL
877723	2010 WV_{60}	—	November 13, 2010	Kitt Peak	Spacewatch	·	790 m	MPC · JPL
877724	2010 WH_{67}	—	November 30, 2010	Mount Lemmon	Mount Lemmon Survey	RAF	680 m	MPC · JPL
877725	2010 WD_{76}	—	February 27, 2012	Haleakala	Pan-STARRS 1	·	1.5 km	MPC · JPL
877726	2010 XS_{14}	—	December 4, 2010	Catalina	CSS	H	460 m	MPC · JPL
877727	2010 XR_{31}	—	November 11, 2010	Mount Lemmon	Mount Lemmon Survey	·	1.0 km	MPC · JPL
877728	2010 XF_{41}	—	October 12, 2006	Palomar	NEAT	·	780 m	MPC · JPL
877729	2010 XB_{42}	—	December 5, 2010	Kitt Peak	Spacewatch	·	1.3 km	MPC · JPL
877730	2010 XM_{86}	—	December 3, 2010	Kitt Peak	Spacewatch	·	1.5 km	MPC · JPL
877731	2010 XN_{100}	—	December 5, 2010	Piszkés-tető	K. Sárneczky, Z. Kuli	H	340 m	MPC · JPL
877732	2010 XQ_{108}	—	December 3, 2010	Mount Lemmon	Mount Lemmon Survey	·	1.2 km	MPC · JPL
877733	2010 XK_{110}	—	December 2, 2010	Kitt Peak	Spacewatch	·	1.1 km	MPC · JPL
877734	2010 XE_{112}	—	December 2, 2010	Kitt Peak	Spacewatch	·	1.4 km	MPC · JPL
877735	2010 YX_{3}	—	December 30, 2010	Piszkés-tető	K. Sárneczky, Z. Kuli	·	1.5 km	MPC · JPL
877736	2011 AE_{6}	—	January 3, 2011	Piszkés-tető	K. Sárneczky, Z. Kuli	·	1.1 km	MPC · JPL
877737	2011 AT_{17}	—	December 2, 2010	Mayhill-ISON	L. Elenin	H	380 m	MPC · JPL
877738	2011 AM_{26}	—	December 13, 2010	Kitt Peak	Spacewatch	·	1.4 km	MPC · JPL
877739	2011 AN_{32}	—	January 10, 2011	Mount Lemmon	Mount Lemmon Survey	·	1.2 km	MPC · JPL
877740	2011 AT_{54}	—	January 14, 2011	Mount Lemmon	Mount Lemmon Survey	·	1.3 km	MPC · JPL
877741	2011 AT_{60}	—	January 13, 2011	Kitt Peak	Spacewatch	·	1.1 km	MPC · JPL
877742	2011 AV_{63}	—	January 14, 2011	Mount Lemmon	Mount Lemmon Survey	·	1.2 km	MPC · JPL
877743	2011 AJ_{83}	—	January 14, 2011	Kitt Peak	Spacewatch	MRX	600 m	MPC · JPL
877744	2011 AS_{88}	—	January 14, 2011	Mount Lemmon	Mount Lemmon Survey	·	1.3 km	MPC · JPL
877745	2011 AF_{89}	—	February 25, 2015	Haleakala	Pan-STARRS 1	·	920 m	MPC · JPL
877746	2011 AE_{90}	—	January 14, 2011	Mount Lemmon	Mount Lemmon Survey	·	1.5 km	MPC · JPL
877747	2011 AS_{100}	—	January 14, 2011	Mount Lemmon	Mount Lemmon Survey	·	1.4 km	MPC · JPL
877748	2011 AO_{107}	—	January 14, 2011	Mount Lemmon	Mount Lemmon Survey	·	1.5 km	MPC · JPL
877749	2011 AV_{112}	—	January 14, 2011	Mount Lemmon	Mount Lemmon Survey	·	1.3 km	MPC · JPL
877750	2011 BX	—	January 9, 2011	Kitt Peak	Spacewatch	·	1.6 km	MPC · JPL
877751	2011 BX_{6}	—	January 16, 2011	Mount Lemmon	Mount Lemmon Survey	critical	890 m	MPC · JPL
877752	2011 BO_{13}	—	January 10, 2011	Kitt Peak	Spacewatch	PHO	750 m	MPC · JPL
877753	2011 BC_{23}	—	January 26, 2011	Kitt Peak	Spacewatch	3:2	4.0 km	MPC · JPL
877754	2011 BM_{49}	—	January 31, 2011	Piszkés-tető	K. Sárneczky, Z. Kuli	·	1.6 km	MPC · JPL
877755	2011 BO_{50}	—	January 31, 2011	Piszkés-tető	K. Sárneczky, Z. Kuli	·	1.9 km	MPC · JPL
877756	2011 BF_{59}	—	December 26, 2010	Mount Lemmon	Mount Lemmon Survey	APO	460 m	MPC · JPL
877757	2011 BC_{62}	—	January 26, 2011	Mount Lemmon	Mount Lemmon Survey	EOS	1.3 km	MPC · JPL
877758	2011 BK_{67}	—	January 28, 2011	Mount Lemmon	Mount Lemmon Survey	·	1.6 km	MPC · JPL
877759	2011 BZ_{67}	—	January 28, 2011	Mount Lemmon	Mount Lemmon Survey	·	1.3 km	MPC · JPL
877760	2011 BB_{75}	—	February 10, 2011	Mount Lemmon	Mount Lemmon Survey	·	1.7 km	MPC · JPL
877761	2011 BC_{75}	—	February 12, 2011	Mount Lemmon	Mount Lemmon Survey	·	770 m	MPC · JPL
877762	2011 BZ_{76}	—	February 25, 2011	Mount Lemmon	Mount Lemmon Survey	·	1.9 km	MPC · JPL
877763	2011 BJ_{91}	—	January 28, 2011	Mount Lemmon	Mount Lemmon Survey	·	2.0 km	MPC · JPL
877764	2011 BQ_{91}	—	January 28, 2011	Mount Lemmon	Mount Lemmon Survey	·	1.2 km	MPC · JPL
877765	2011 BB_{128}	—	December 8, 2010	Mount Lemmon	Mount Lemmon Survey	·	1.2 km	MPC · JPL
877766	2011 BL_{139}	—	January 29, 2011	Mount Lemmon	Mount Lemmon Survey	EOS	1.4 km	MPC · JPL
877767	2011 BE_{147}	—	January 29, 2011	Mount Lemmon	Mount Lemmon Survey	3:2	3.5 km	MPC · JPL
877768	2011 BZ_{154}	—	January 30, 2004	Kitt Peak	Spacewatch	·	490 m	MPC · JPL
877769	2011 BZ_{155}	—	January 28, 2011	Mount Lemmon	Mount Lemmon Survey	NYS	760 m	MPC · JPL
877770	2011 BL_{158}	—	January 8, 2011	Mount Lemmon	Mount Lemmon Survey	·	2.0 km	MPC · JPL
877771	2011 BK_{166}	—	January 27, 2011	Mount Lemmon	Mount Lemmon Survey	·	800 m	MPC · JPL
877772	2011 BU_{166}	—	February 8, 2011	Mount Lemmon	Mount Lemmon Survey	THM	1.6 km	MPC · JPL
877773	2011 BO_{177}	—	January 29, 2011	Mount Lemmon	Mount Lemmon Survey	·	1.8 km	MPC · JPL
877774	2011 BG_{179}	—	January 30, 2011	Mount Lemmon	Mount Lemmon Survey	AEO	670 m	MPC · JPL
877775	2011 BN_{179}	—	February 10, 2011	Mount Lemmon	Mount Lemmon Survey	·	960 m	MPC · JPL
877776	2011 BV_{180}	—	February 7, 2011	Mount Lemmon	Mount Lemmon Survey	·	1.3 km	MPC · JPL
877777	2011 BD_{184}	—	January 29, 2011	Kitt Peak	Spacewatch	H	370 m	MPC · JPL
877778	2011 BS_{184}	—	February 7, 2011	Mount Lemmon	Mount Lemmon Survey	·	1.3 km	MPC · JPL
877779	2011 BX_{185}	—	January 27, 2011	Mount Lemmon	Mount Lemmon Survey	·	2.1 km	MPC · JPL
877780	2011 BU_{186}	—	February 8, 2011	Mount Lemmon	Mount Lemmon Survey	·	890 m	MPC · JPL
877781	2011 BH_{192}	—	June 18, 2018	Haleakala	Pan-STARRS 1	·	1.3 km	MPC · JPL
877782	2011 BK_{198}	—	January 25, 2011	Kitt Peak	Spacewatch	·	1.4 km	MPC · JPL
877783	2011 BW_{198}	—	January 30, 2011	Haleakala	Pan-STARRS 1	·	1.4 km	MPC · JPL
877784	2011 BU_{202}	—	January 26, 2011	Mount Lemmon	Mount Lemmon Survey	·	880 m	MPC · JPL
877785	2011 BQ_{203}	—	January 30, 2011	Haleakala	Pan-STARRS 1	·	710 m	MPC · JPL
877786	2011 CN_{13}	—	February 5, 2011	Mount Lemmon	Mount Lemmon Survey	·	1.5 km	MPC · JPL
877787	2011 CR_{33}	—	January 27, 2011	Mount Lemmon	Mount Lemmon Survey	·	2.6 km	MPC · JPL
877788	2011 CL_{69}	—	January 12, 2011	Mount Lemmon	Mount Lemmon Survey	MAS	520 m	MPC · JPL
877789	2011 CM_{92}	—	February 5, 2011	Haleakala	Pan-STARRS 1	·	2.1 km	MPC · JPL
877790	2011 CB_{95}	—	February 5, 2011	Haleakala	Pan-STARRS 1	·	910 m	MPC · JPL
877791	2011 CK_{95}	—	February 10, 2011	Mount Lemmon	Mount Lemmon Survey	·	1.0 km	MPC · JPL
877792	2011 CK_{98}	—	February 5, 2011	Haleakala	Pan-STARRS 1	·	1.7 km	MPC · JPL
877793	2011 CF_{105}	—	February 5, 2011	Haleakala	Pan-STARRS 1	·	660 m	MPC · JPL
877794	2011 CN_{111}	—	March 25, 2011	Haleakala	Pan-STARRS 1	·	1.2 km	MPC · JPL
877795	2011 CV_{116}	—	February 5, 2011	Haleakala	Pan-STARRS 1	·	1.4 km	MPC · JPL
877796	2011 CN_{123}	—	January 29, 2000	Kitt Peak	Spacewatch	·	2.2 km	MPC · JPL
877797	2011 CX_{127}	—	June 8, 2016	Haleakala	Pan-STARRS 1	·	900 m	MPC · JPL
877798	2011 CY_{129}	—	February 8, 2011	Mount Lemmon	Mount Lemmon Survey	·	720 m	MPC · JPL
877799	2011 CA_{132}	—	February 7, 2011	Mount Lemmon	Mount Lemmon Survey	·	1.4 km	MPC · JPL
877800	2011 CY_{134}	—	February 8, 2011	Mount Lemmon	Mount Lemmon Survey	·	1.2 km	MPC · JPL

== 877801–877900 ==
back to top

Designation			Discovery			Properties		Ref
Permanent	Provisional	Named after	Date	Site	Discoverer(s)	Category	Diam.	Ref
877801	2011 CV_{137}	—	January 30, 2011	Mount Lemmon	Mount Lemmon Survey	·	1.6 km	MPC · JPL
877802	2011 CG_{157}	—	February 5, 2011	Haleakala	Pan-STARRS 1	·	2.0 km	MPC · JPL
877803	2011 DU_{18}	—	February 26, 2011	Mount Lemmon	Mount Lemmon Survey	·	1.6 km	MPC · JPL
877804	2011 DU_{29}	—	March 1, 2008	Kitt Peak	Spacewatch	·	400 m	MPC · JPL
877805	2011 DM_{57}	—	October 8, 2002	Anderson Mesa	LONEOS	ERI	1.1 km	MPC · JPL
877806	2011 DE_{59}	—	February 26, 2011	Mount Lemmon	Mount Lemmon Survey	·	2.5 km	MPC · JPL
877807	2011 EO_{10}	—	February 10, 2011	Mount Lemmon	Mount Lemmon Survey	critical	1.5 km	MPC · JPL
877808	2011 EL_{11}	—	March 4, 2011	Mount Lemmon	Mount Lemmon Survey	APO · PHA	380 m	MPC · JPL
877809	2011 EO_{24}	—	February 25, 2011	Kitt Peak	Spacewatch	·	1.5 km	MPC · JPL
877810	2011 EJ_{29}	—	March 4, 2011	Mount Lemmon	Mount Lemmon Survey	HYG	1.8 km	MPC · JPL
877811	2011 EX_{39}	—	March 21, 1993	La Silla	UESAC	NYS	1.1 km	MPC · JPL
877812	2011 EL_{46}	—	March 10, 2011	Mayhill	Falla, N.	·	660 m	MPC · JPL
877813	2011 EZ_{67}	—	November 22, 2009	Mount Lemmon	Mount Lemmon Survey	·	1.6 km	MPC · JPL
877814	2011 EC_{82}	—	March 6, 2011	Mount Lemmon	Mount Lemmon Survey	THB · critical	1.8 km	MPC · JPL
877815	2011 EV_{82}	—	February 7, 2011	Catalina	CSS	T_{j} (2.99)	2.5 km	MPC · JPL
877816	2011 EO_{85}	—	February 23, 2011	Haleakala	Pan-STARRS 1	·	1.9 km	MPC · JPL
877817	2011 EU_{94}	—	March 13, 2011	Mount Lemmon	Mount Lemmon Survey	TIR	1.7 km	MPC · JPL
877818	2011 EF_{97}	—	March 22, 2017	Haleakala	Pan-STARRS 1	·	2.3 km	MPC · JPL
877819	2011 EO_{99}	—	September 3, 2013	Mount Lemmon	Mount Lemmon Survey	·	2.1 km	MPC · JPL
877820	2011 EE_{104}	—	March 13, 2011	Kitt Peak	Spacewatch	·	1.9 km	MPC · JPL
877821	2011 EO_{105}	—	March 4, 2011	Catalina	CSS	H	370 m	MPC · JPL
877822	2011 EA_{111}	—	March 10, 2011	Kitt Peak	Spacewatch	·	2.1 km	MPC · JPL
877823	2011 EX_{111}	—	March 4, 2011	Mount Lemmon	Mount Lemmon Survey	·	1.8 km	MPC · JPL
877824	2011 FX_{2}	—	March 26, 2011	Haleakala	Pan-STARRS 1	H	450 m	MPC · JPL
877825	2011 FV_{4}	—	March 24, 2011	Kitt Peak	Spacewatch	·	1.9 km	MPC · JPL
877826	2011 FA_{14}	—	March 27, 2011	Mount Lemmon	Mount Lemmon Survey	·	1.4 km	MPC · JPL
877827	2011 FY_{17}	—	March 23, 2011	Bergisch Gladbach	W. Bickel	LIX	2.7 km	MPC · JPL
877828	2011 FN_{39}	—	March 13, 2011	Kitt Peak	Spacewatch	·	560 m	MPC · JPL
877829	2011 FK_{55}	—	March 29, 2011	Mount Lemmon	Mount Lemmon Survey	·	1.1 km	MPC · JPL
877830	2011 FE_{75}	—	April 27, 2006	Kitt Peak	Spacewatch	·	1.6 km	MPC · JPL
877831	2011 FR_{87}	—	September 3, 2008	Kitt Peak	Spacewatch	·	410 m	MPC · JPL
877832	2011 FC_{96}	—	March 29, 2011	Mount Lemmon	Mount Lemmon Survey	·	2.0 km	MPC · JPL
877833	2011 FJ_{109}	—	April 5, 2011	Mount Lemmon	Mount Lemmon Survey	·	420 m	MPC · JPL
877834	2011 FR_{117}	—	April 2, 2011	Mount Lemmon	Mount Lemmon Survey	·	980 m	MPC · JPL
877835	2011 FZ_{118}	—	April 1, 2011	Mount Lemmon	Mount Lemmon Survey	·	1.9 km	MPC · JPL
877836	2011 FP_{124}	—	April 1, 2011	Mount Lemmon	Mount Lemmon Survey	·	2.0 km	MPC · JPL
877837	2011 FW_{125}	—	December 20, 2009	Mount Lemmon	Mount Lemmon Survey	·	1.3 km	MPC · JPL
877838	2011 FW_{141}	—	October 5, 2002	Sacramento Peak	SDSS	·	3.9 km	MPC · JPL
877839	2011 FV_{144}	—	March 26, 2011	Haleakala	Pan-STARRS 1	·	1.1 km	MPC · JPL
877840	2011 FF_{162}	—	March 29, 2011	Kitt Peak	Spacewatch	·	1.1 km	MPC · JPL
877841	2011 FM_{162}	—	March 27, 2011	Kitt Peak	Spacewatch	(1547)	1.3 km	MPC · JPL
877842	2011 FR_{163}	—	June 7, 2015	Mount Lemmon	Mount Lemmon Survey	·	650 m	MPC · JPL
877843	2011 FV_{165}	—	April 5, 2011	Mount Lemmon	Mount Lemmon Survey	·	960 m	MPC · JPL
877844	2011 FF_{167}	—	July 9, 2015	Haleakala	Pan-STARRS 1	·	540 m	MPC · JPL
877845	2011 FB_{171}	—	March 27, 2011	Mount Lemmon	Mount Lemmon Survey	·	2.1 km	MPC · JPL
877846	2011 FJ_{171}	—	March 27, 2011	Mount Lemmon	Mount Lemmon Survey	·	2.1 km	MPC · JPL
877847	2011 FV_{171}	—	March 27, 2011	Mount Lemmon	Mount Lemmon Survey	·	2.1 km	MPC · JPL
877848	2011 GR_{2}	—	February 11, 2011	Mount Lemmon	Mount Lemmon Survey	·	1.7 km	MPC · JPL
877849	2011 GY_{2}	—	April 2, 2011	Wildberg	R. Apitzsch	·	1.7 km	MPC · JPL
877850	2011 GJ_{11}	—	March 10, 2010	WISE	WISE	T_{j} (2.99)	2.9 km	MPC · JPL
877851	2011 GO_{12}	—	March 7, 2010	WISE	WISE	·	2.4 km	MPC · JPL
877852	2011 GH_{15}	—	April 1, 2011	Mount Lemmon	Mount Lemmon Survey	·	1.8 km	MPC · JPL
877853	2011 GW_{35}	—	April 3, 2011	Haleakala	Pan-STARRS 1	·	1.5 km	MPC · JPL
877854	2011 GX_{35}	—	April 3, 2011	Haleakala	Pan-STARRS 1	TIR	2.3 km	MPC · JPL
877855	2011 GZ_{54}	—	April 5, 2011	Siding Spring	SSS	AMO	140 m	MPC · JPL
877856	2011 GN_{71}	—	April 8, 2011	Catalina	CSS	·	1.3 km	MPC · JPL
877857	2011 GB_{75}	—	March 28, 2011	Mount Lemmon	Mount Lemmon Survey	·	1.8 km	MPC · JPL
877858	2011 GF_{85}	—	April 13, 2011	Mount Lemmon	Mount Lemmon Survey	·	2.2 km	MPC · JPL
877859	2011 GS_{92}	—	October 10, 2012	Mount Lemmon	Mount Lemmon Survey	·	1.2 km	MPC · JPL
877860	2011 GE_{93}	—	April 13, 2011	Mount Lemmon	Mount Lemmon Survey	JUN	670 m	MPC · JPL
877861	2011 GX_{94}	—	April 6, 2011	Mount Lemmon	Mount Lemmon Survey	·	1.3 km	MPC · JPL
877862	2011 GB_{98}	—	March 28, 2017	Roque de los Muchachos	EURONEAR	·	1.9 km	MPC · JPL
877863	2011 GV_{98}	—	October 11, 2012	Haleakala	Pan-STARRS 1	(5)	840 m	MPC · JPL
877864	2011 GW_{101}	—	April 1, 2011	Kitt Peak	Spacewatch	·	970 m	MPC · JPL
877865	2011 GL_{106}	—	April 4, 2011	Kitt Peak	Spacewatch	JUN	670 m	MPC · JPL
877866	2011 HH_{5}	—	April 26, 2011	Mount Lemmon	Mount Lemmon Survey	H	280 m	MPC · JPL
877867	2011 HT_{7}	—	April 28, 2011	Kitt Peak	Spacewatch	·	1.2 km	MPC · JPL
877868	2011 HX_{7}	—	April 26, 2011	Mount Lemmon	Mount Lemmon Survey	·	2.3 km	MPC · JPL
877869	2011 HQ_{24}	—	April 23, 2011	Haleakala	Pan-STARRS 1	·	2.1 km	MPC · JPL
877870	2011 HR_{26}	—	May 11, 2005	Mount Lemmon	Mount Lemmon Survey	T_{j} (2.98)	3.3 km	MPC · JPL
877871	2011 HO_{34}	—	March 12, 2011	Siding Spring	SSS	·	1.8 km	MPC · JPL
877872	2011 HS_{34}	—	April 7, 2011	Kitt Peak	Spacewatch	THB	2.4 km	MPC · JPL
877873	2011 HZ_{36}	—	April 27, 2011	Haleakala	Pan-STARRS 1	·	2.0 km	MPC · JPL
877874	2011 HP_{49}	—	April 11, 2011	Mount Lemmon	Mount Lemmon Survey	·	1.2 km	MPC · JPL
877875	2011 HF_{59}	—	April 13, 2011	Kitt Peak	Spacewatch	·	2.2 km	MPC · JPL
877876	2011 HM_{59}	—	April 28, 2011	Haleakala	Pan-STARRS 1	·	2.5 km	MPC · JPL
877877	2011 HS_{60}	—	April 30, 2011	Haleakala	Pan-STARRS 1	APO	190 m	MPC · JPL
877878	2011 HL_{65}	—	March 27, 2011	Kitt Peak	Spacewatch	THB	2.1 km	MPC · JPL
877879	2011 HC_{67}	—	March 10, 2011	Mount Lemmon	Mount Lemmon Survey	·	1.7 km	MPC · JPL
877880	2011 HY_{73}	—	April 27, 2011	Mount Lemmon	Mount Lemmon Survey	·	700 m	MPC · JPL
877881	2011 HG_{84}	—	March 10, 2011	Mount Lemmon	Mount Lemmon Survey	·	2.5 km	MPC · JPL
877882	2011 HD_{99}	—	March 20, 2010	WISE	WISE	·	1.8 km	MPC · JPL
877883	2011 HC_{110}	—	April 27, 2011	Kitt Peak	Spacewatch	·	2.3 km	MPC · JPL
877884	2011 HK_{110}	—	April 28, 2011	Mount Lemmon	Mount Lemmon Survey	(1547)	730 m	MPC · JPL
877885	2011 JW	—	April 23, 2011	Catalina	CSS	T_{j} (2.95)	1.9 km	MPC · JPL
877886	2011 JV_{1}	—	May 3, 2011	Mount Lemmon	Mount Lemmon Survey	·	670 m	MPC · JPL
877887	2011 JG_{2}	—	May 3, 2011	Marly	P. Kocher	·	2.9 km	MPC · JPL
877888	2011 JM_{18}	—	April 2, 2011	Kitt Peak	Spacewatch	·	1.2 km	MPC · JPL
877889	2011 JL_{22}	—	May 1, 2011	Haleakala	Pan-STARRS 1	·	1.1 km	MPC · JPL
877890	2011 JP_{23}	—	May 1, 2011	Haleakala	Pan-STARRS 1	·	680 m	MPC · JPL
877891	2011 JL_{33}	—	May 1, 2011	Haleakala	Pan-STARRS 1	·	1.3 km	MPC · JPL
877892	2011 JF_{34}	—	May 8, 2011	Mount Lemmon	Mount Lemmon Survey	·	1.1 km	MPC · JPL
877893	2011 JX_{34}	—	May 1, 2011	Haleakala	Pan-STARRS 1	·	1 km	MPC · JPL
877894	2011 JB_{35}	—	May 6, 2011	Kitt Peak	Spacewatch	·	1.1 km	MPC · JPL
877895	2011 JL_{37}	—	May 3, 2011	Mount Lemmon	Mount Lemmon Survey	·	970 m	MPC · JPL
877896	2011 KO_{1}	—	April 28, 2011	Haleakala	Pan-STARRS 1	·	1.0 km	MPC · JPL
877897	2011 KQ_{10}	—	May 10, 2011	Mount Lemmon	Mount Lemmon Survey	JUN	550 m	MPC · JPL
877898	2011 KU_{35}	—	April 12, 2005	Kitt Peak	Spacewatch	·	2.4 km	MPC · JPL
877899	2011 KP_{38}	—	April 29, 2011	Mount Lemmon	Mount Lemmon Survey	·	1.2 km	MPC · JPL
877900	2011 KC_{47}	—	May 31, 2011	Mount Lemmon	Mount Lemmon Survey	·	880 m	MPC · JPL

== 877901–878000 ==
back to top

Designation			Discovery			Properties		Ref
Permanent	Provisional	Named after	Date	Site	Discoverer(s)	Category	Diam.	Ref
877901	2011 KW_{50}	—	May 28, 2011	Nogales	M. Schwartz, P. R. Holvorcem	·	1.2 km	MPC · JPL
877902	2011 KQ_{51}	—	May 21, 2011	Mount Lemmon	Mount Lemmon Survey	EUN	820 m	MPC · JPL
877903	2011 KK_{56}	—	May 24, 2011	Mount Lemmon	Mount Lemmon Survey	EUN	710 m	MPC · JPL
877904	2011 KW_{56}	—	May 22, 2011	Mount Lemmon	Mount Lemmon Survey	·	690 m	MPC · JPL
877905	2011 KZ_{59}	—	May 21, 2011	Mount Lemmon	Mount Lemmon Survey	LIX	2.8 km	MPC · JPL
877906	2011 LJ_{5}	—	June 3, 2011	Catalina	CSS	·	1 km	MPC · JPL
877907	2011 LN_{8}	—	April 2, 2005	Bergisch Gladbach	W. Bickel	THB	2.4 km	MPC · JPL
877908	2011 LL_{9}	—	May 2, 2011	Kitt Peak	Spacewatch	TIR	1.8 km	MPC · JPL
877909	2011 LC_{12}	—	April 5, 2011	Mount Lemmon	Mount Lemmon Survey	·	970 m	MPC · JPL
877910	2011 LE_{20}	—	June 10, 2011	Mount Lemmon	Mount Lemmon Survey	·	1.3 km	MPC · JPL
877911	2011 LY_{30}	—	June 3, 2011	Mount Lemmon	Mount Lemmon Survey	·	1.1 km	MPC · JPL
877912	2011 LN_{33}	—	June 9, 2011	Mount Lemmon	Mount Lemmon Survey	·	940 m	MPC · JPL
877913	2011 LP_{33}	—	April 23, 2015	Haleakala	Pan-STARRS 1	(194)	910 m	MPC · JPL
877914	2011 LY_{34}	—	September 1, 2011	Haleakala	Pan-STARRS 1	·	1.8 km	MPC · JPL
877915	2011 ME	—	June 21, 2011	Socorro	LINEAR	APO	410 m	MPC · JPL
877916	2011 MV	—	June 23, 2011	Mount Lemmon	Mount Lemmon Survey	AMO	200 m	MPC · JPL
877917	2011 MG_{1}	—	June 24, 2011	Mount Lemmon	Mount Lemmon Survey	ADE	1.4 km	MPC · JPL
877918	2011 MR_{3}	—	June 28, 2011	Socorro	LINEAR	·	940 m	MPC · JPL
877919	2011 ML_{11}	—	June 27, 2011	Kitt Peak	Spacewatch	·	1.2 km	MPC · JPL
877920	2011 MA_{14}	—	June 27, 2011	Mount Lemmon	Mount Lemmon Survey	·	760 m	MPC · JPL
877921	2011 MZ_{14}	—	June 25, 2011	Mount Lemmon	Mount Lemmon Survey	EUN	920 m	MPC · JPL
877922	2011 MA_{15}	—	June 27, 2011	Kitt Peak	Spacewatch	EUN	920 m	MPC · JPL
877923	2011 MD_{15}	—	June 26, 2011	Mount Lemmon	Mount Lemmon Survey	·	1.2 km	MPC · JPL
877924	2011 NW_{5}	—	July 1, 2011	Kitt Peak	Spacewatch	ADE	1.4 km	MPC · JPL
877925	2011 OP_{8}	—	July 26, 2011	Haleakala	Pan-STARRS 1	EUN	770 m	MPC · JPL
877926	2011 OS_{9}	—	July 27, 2011	Haleakala	Pan-STARRS 1	·	830 m	MPC · JPL
877927	2011 OD_{15}	—	July 26, 2011	Haleakala	Pan-STARRS 1	·	1.0 km	MPC · JPL
877928	2011 OE_{25}	—	July 26, 2011	Haleakala	Pan-STARRS 1	EUN	810 m	MPC · JPL
877929	2011 OL_{40}	—	July 26, 2011	Haleakala	Pan-STARRS 1	·	1.2 km	MPC · JPL
877930	2011 OA_{58}	—	June 26, 2011	Mount Lemmon	Mount Lemmon Survey	H	450 m	MPC · JPL
877931	2011 OV_{62}	—	July 25, 2011	Haleakala	Pan-STARRS 1	·	1.7 km	MPC · JPL
877932	2011 OK_{65}	—	July 25, 2011	Haleakala	Pan-STARRS 1	·	1.4 km	MPC · JPL
877933	2011 OU_{68}	—	July 28, 2011	Haleakala	Pan-STARRS 1	·	890 m	MPC · JPL
877934	2011 OV_{70}	—	July 26, 2011	Haleakala	Pan-STARRS 1	·	1.4 km	MPC · JPL
877935	2011 OB_{71}	—	July 28, 2011	Haleakala	Pan-STARRS 1	·	1.5 km	MPC · JPL
877936	2011 OE_{71}	—	October 9, 2007	Kitt Peak	Spacewatch	·	1.0 km	MPC · JPL
877937	2011 OM_{72}	—	July 28, 2011	Haleakala	Pan-STARRS 1	·	1.3 km	MPC · JPL
877938	2011 OJ_{76}	—	July 27, 2011	Haleakala	Pan-STARRS 1	EOS	1.3 km	MPC · JPL
877939	2011 PH_{1}	—	August 2, 2011	Dauban	C. Rinner, Kugel, F.	·	420 m	MPC · JPL
877940	2011 PQ_{1}	—	August 1, 2011	Pian dei Termini	Osservatorio Astronomico della Montagna Pistoiese	JUN	630 m	MPC · JPL
877941	2011 PO_{5}	—	July 1, 2011	Mount Lemmon	Mount Lemmon Survey	·	1.0 km	MPC · JPL
877942	2011 PB_{8}	—	August 6, 2011	Haleakala	Pan-STARRS 1	·	1.3 km	MPC · JPL
877943	2011 PK_{21}	—	August 3, 2011	Haleakala	Pan-STARRS 1	·	990 m	MPC · JPL
877944	2011 PS_{21}	—	August 2, 2011	Haleakala	Pan-STARRS 1	EUN	800 m	MPC · JPL
877945	2011 QL_{4}	—	July 1, 2011	Kitt Peak	Spacewatch	EUN	880 m	MPC · JPL
877946	2011 QW_{10}	—	August 20, 2011	Haleakala	Pan-STARRS 1	·	1.0 km	MPC · JPL
877947	2011 QX_{10}	—	August 20, 2011	Haleakala	Pan-STARRS 1	·	1.1 km	MPC · JPL
877948	2011 QW_{27}	—	June 26, 1998	La Silla	E. W. Elst	·	2.8 km	MPC · JPL
877949	2011 QT_{29}	—	October 30, 2008	Kitt Peak	Spacewatch	·	500 m	MPC · JPL
877950	2011 QS_{34}	—	July 28, 2011	Haleakala	Pan-STARRS 1	·	860 m	MPC · JPL
877951	2011 QU_{36}	—	August 27, 2011	Haleakala	Pan-STARRS 1	EUN	1.0 km	MPC · JPL
877952	2011 QV_{43}	—	August 26, 2011	Haleakala	Pan-STARRS 1	·	1.4 km	MPC · JPL
877953	2011 QH_{51}	—	August 5, 2011	La Sagra	OAM	·	1.7 km	MPC · JPL
877954	2011 QW_{52}	—	August 30, 2011	Haleakala	Pan-STARRS 1	·	1.2 km	MPC · JPL
877955	2011 QU_{60}	—	August 30, 2011	Haleakala	Pan-STARRS 1	·	1.3 km	MPC · JPL
877956	2011 QA_{62}	—	August 31, 2011	Haleakala	Pan-STARRS 1	·	1.4 km	MPC · JPL
877957	2011 QV_{62}	—	August 20, 2011	Haleakala	Pan-STARRS 1	·	1.2 km	MPC · JPL
877958	2011 QA_{66}	—	July 28, 2011	Haleakala	Pan-STARRS 1	(194)	900 m	MPC · JPL
877959	2011 QT_{69}	—	August 4, 2011	Haleakala	Pan-STARRS 1	·	1.1 km	MPC · JPL
877960	2011 QU_{71}	—	August 27, 2011	Andrushivka	Y. Ivaščenko, Kyrylenko, P.	·	490 m	MPC · JPL
877961	2011 QO_{87}	—	August 26, 2011	Piszkés-tető	K. Sárneczky, S. Kürti	·	1.0 km	MPC · JPL
877962	2011 QP_{90}	—	August 29, 2011	Siding Spring	SSS	·	1.2 km	MPC · JPL
877963	2011 QJ_{91}	—	September 13, 2002	Palomar	NEAT	·	1.3 km	MPC · JPL
877964	2011 QO_{93}	—	August 30, 2011	Haleakala	Pan-STARRS 1	·	1.4 km	MPC · JPL
877965	2011 QL_{94}	—	August 31, 2011	Haleakala	Pan-STARRS 1	·	1.3 km	MPC · JPL
877966	2011 QA_{96}	—	August 23, 2011	Haleakala	Pan-STARRS 1	H	510 m	MPC · JPL
877967	2011 QF_{100}	—	August 27, 2011	Haleakala	Pan-STARRS 1	·	2.1 km	MPC · JPL
877968	2011 QF_{102}	—	August 20, 2011	Haleakala	Pan-STARRS 1	·	630 m	MPC · JPL
877969	2011 QU_{104}	—	August 27, 2011	Haleakala	Pan-STARRS 1	·	1.2 km	MPC · JPL
877970	2011 QC_{105}	—	August 28, 2011	Haleakala	Pan-STARRS 1	·	980 m	MPC · JPL
877971	2011 QY_{107}	—	October 6, 2016	Haleakala	Pan-STARRS 1	·	1.5 km	MPC · JPL
877972	2011 QV_{108}	—	August 24, 2011	Haleakala	Pan-STARRS 1	·	1.1 km	MPC · JPL
877973	2011 QD_{109}	—	August 24, 2011	Haleakala	Pan-STARRS 1	·	1.6 km	MPC · JPL
877974	2011 QN_{110}	—	August 23, 2011	Mayhill-ISON	L. Elenin	NEM	1.6 km	MPC · JPL
877975	2011 QA_{111}	—	August 30, 2011	Kitt Peak	Spacewatch	·	1.0 km	MPC · JPL
877976	2011 QG_{111}	—	August 23, 2011	Haleakala	Pan-STARRS 1	·	1.0 km	MPC · JPL
877977	2011 QL_{112}	—	August 30, 2011	Haleakala	Pan-STARRS 1	EUN	750 m	MPC · JPL
877978	2011 QX_{116}	—	August 30, 2011	Haleakala	Pan-STARRS 1	H	380 m	MPC · JPL
877979	2011 QQ_{118}	—	August 23, 2011	Haleakala	Pan-STARRS 1	EOS	1.3 km	MPC · JPL
877980	2011 RV	—	September 4, 2011	La Sagra	OAM	·	1.2 km	MPC · JPL
877981	2011 RB_{6}	—	August 23, 2011	Haleakala	Pan-STARRS 1	·	490 m	MPC · JPL
877982	2011 RB_{10}	—	August 24, 2011	Haleakala	Pan-STARRS 1	AEO	720 m	MPC · JPL
877983	2011 RP_{10}	—	August 24, 2011	Haleakala	Pan-STARRS 1	AEO	810 m	MPC · JPL
877984	2011 RY_{10}	—	September 4, 2011	Kitt Peak	Spacewatch	·	930 m	MPC · JPL
877985	2011 RD_{11}	—	August 26, 1998	Prescott	P. G. Comba	(1547)	1.3 km	MPC · JPL
877986	2011 RL_{11}	—	September 3, 2011	La Sagra	OAM	·	1.5 km	MPC · JPL
877987	2011 RB_{16}	—	September 15, 2011	Haleakala	Pan-STARRS 1	·	480 m	MPC · JPL
877988	2011 RQ_{17}	—	September 4, 2011	Haleakala	Pan-STARRS 1	·	2.1 km	MPC · JPL
877989	2011 RA_{18}	—	September 4, 2011	Haleakala	Pan-STARRS 1	·	710 m	MPC · JPL
877990	2011 RH_{19}	—	September 8, 2011	Haleakala	Pan-STARRS 1	critical	1.5 km	MPC · JPL
877991	2011 RP_{22}	—	September 5, 2011	Mauna Kea	D. J. Tholen, A. Draginda	·	450 m	MPC · JPL
877992	2011 RM_{24}	—	September 4, 2011	Haleakala	Pan-STARRS 1	·	1.3 km	MPC · JPL
877993	2011 RB_{26}	—	September 5, 2011	Haleakala	Pan-STARRS 1	·	1.0 km	MPC · JPL
877994	2011 RC_{27}	—	September 7, 2011	Kitt Peak	Spacewatch	·	980 m	MPC · JPL
877995	2011 RD_{28}	—	September 8, 2011	Kitt Peak	Spacewatch	·	1.1 km	MPC · JPL
877996	2011 RW_{28}	—	September 4, 2011	Haleakala	Pan-STARRS 1	·	1.3 km	MPC · JPL
877997	2011 RE_{29}	—	September 4, 2011	Haleakala	Pan-STARRS 1	DOR	1.6 km	MPC · JPL
877998	2011 RR_{29}	—	September 4, 2011	Haleakala	Pan-STARRS 1	·	1.4 km	MPC · JPL
877999	2011 RV_{29}	—	September 4, 2011	Haleakala	Pan-STARRS 1	AGN	790 m	MPC · JPL
878000	2011 RA_{30}	—	September 4, 2011	Haleakala	Pan-STARRS 1	AEO	790 m	MPC · JPL

back to top
